= 2022–23 Al-Faisaly FC season =

Al-Faisaly
2022–23 season
- President: Fahd Al-Medlej
- Manager: Ante Miše
- Stadium: Al Majma'ah Sports City
- FDL: 3rd
- Champions League: Round of 16
- All statistics correct as of 16 July 2022.

The 2022–23 season is Al-Faisaly's first season back in the Saudi First Division League following their relegation from the Pro League last season in their 69th year in existence. The club will also compete in the AFC Champions League starting from the Round of 16 stage.

The season covers the period from 1 July 2022 to 30 June 2023.

== Players ==
=== Squad information ===
As of 1 February 2023

Note: Flags indicate national team as defined under FIFA eligibility rules; some limited exceptions apply. Players may hold more than one non-FIFA nationality.

No.	Pos.	Nation	Player
1	GK	KSA	Mohammed Al-Hassawi
2	DF	KSA	Abdullah Al-Hassan
3	DF	KSA	Yassin Barnawi
4	MF	CRO	Josip Vuković (on loan from Hajduk Split)
5	DF	KSA	Mohammed Al-Amri
6	MF	MAR	Omar Arjoune
8	MF	KSA	Abdulmajeed Al-Swat
10	MF	BRA	Rossi
11	MF	CPV	Willy Semedo
12	DF	KSA	Abdulrahman Al-Rio
13	DF	KSA	Ahmed Assiri
16	MF	KSA	Hassan Al-Shamrani
17	DF	KSA	Saleh Al-Qumayzi
19	FW	KSA	Yazeed Joshan
20	MF	KSA	Abdullah Al-Qahtani
21	MF	KSA	Abdulaziz Dhafir

No.	Pos.	Nation	Player
22	FW	KSA	Ahmed Al-Shamrani
23	FW	KEN	Masoud Juma (on loan from Difaâ Hassani El Jadidi)
25	MF	KSA	Ismail Omar
27	FW	KSA	Saleh Al-Rahmani
28	GK	KSA	Ahmed Al-Kassar
31	GK	KSA	Sultan Al-Qahtani
32	MF	ARG	Mariano Vázquez
39	MF	KSA	Abdulrahman Al-Dawsari
44	GK	KSA	Raed Azybi (on loan from Al-Nassr)
50	DF	KSA	Ali Al-Absi
55	DF	KSA	Mohammed Al-Nukhylan
66	DF	KSA	Ali Al Sultan
78	DF	KSA	Khaled Daghriri
87	DF	KSA	Meshal Al-Sebyani
88	MF	KSA	Abdulaziz Al-Sharid
99	DF	KSA	Waleed Al-Ahmed

=== Out on loan ===
Note: Flags indicate national team as defined under FIFA eligibility rules; some limited exceptions apply. Players may hold more than one non-FIFA nationality.

No.	Pos.	Nation	Player
14	FW	KSA	Saleh Al Abbas (at Al-Khaleej until 30 June 2023)
42	MF	KSA	Hamed Fallatah (at Al-Jabalain until 30 June 2023)

No.	Pos.	Nation	Player
70	MF	KSA	Ahmed Al-Anzi (at Najran until 30 June 2023)
—	GK	KSA	Taher Al-Hajji (at Al-Khaleej until 30 June 2023)

== Transfers and loans ==
=== Transfers in ===
Entry date	Position	No.	Player	From club	Fee	Ref.
30 June 2022	GK	22	(Saudi Arabia) Taher Al-Hajji	(Saudi Arabia) Al-Khaleej	End of loan	
30 June 2022	DF	2	(Saudi Arabia) Abdullah Al-Hassan	(Saudi Arabia) Al-Jabalain	End of loan	
30 June 2022	MF	5	(Saudi Arabia) Hussain Al Quraish	(Saudi Arabia) Al-Safa	End of loan	
30 June 2022	MF	7	(Saudi Arabia) Hamoud Al-Shammari	(Saudi Arabia) Al-Jandal	End of loan	
30 June 2022	MF	20	(Saudi Arabia) Abdullah Al-Qahtani	(Saudi Arabia) Abha	End of loan	
30 June 2022	MF	42	(Saudi Arabia) Hamed Fallatah	(Saudi Arabia) Al-Tai	End of loan	
30 June 2022	MF	70	(Saudi Arabia) Ahmed Al-Anzi	(Saudi Arabia) Al-Adalah	End of loan	
30 June 2022	FW	19	(Saudi Arabia) Yazeed Joshan	(Serbia) Zemun	End of loan	
31 July 2022	MF	6	(Morocco) Omar Arjoune	(Morocco) Raja CA	Free	
4 August 2022	FW	9	(Brazil) Cassiano	(Portugal) Vizela	$300,000	
23 August 2022	MF	37	(Morocco) Reda Hajhouj	(Morocco) FUS Rabat	$200,000	
26 August 2022	FW	84	(Bosnia and Herzegovina) Marin Jurina	(Hungary) Mezőkövesdi	Free	
9 September 2022	DF	12	(Saudi Arabia) Abdulrahman Al-Rio	(Saudi Arabia) Damac	Free	
7 January 2023	MF	32	(Argentina) Mariano Vázquez	(Colombia) Deportivo Pasto	Free	
28 January 2023	MF	11	(Cape Verde) Willy Semedo	(Cyprus) Pafos	Undisclosed	

=== Loans in ===
Start date	End date	Position	No.	Player	From club	Fee	Ref.
6 September 2022	End of season	GK	44	(Saudi Arabia) Raed Azybi	(Saudi Arabia) Al-Nassr	None	
4 January 2023	End of season	MF	4	(Croatia) Josip Vuković	(Croatia) Hajduk Split	None	
29 January 2023	End of season	FW	23	(Kenya) Masoud Juma	(Morocco) Difaâ Hassani El Jadidi	None	

=== Transfers out ===
Exit date	Position	No.	Player	To club	Fee	Ref.
1 July 2022	DF	–	(Saudi Arabia) Adel Hazazi	(Saudi Arabia) Al-Eetemad	Free	
1 July 2022	MF	5	(Saudi Arabia) Hussain Al Quraish	(Saudi Arabia) Al-Safa	Free	
1 July 2022	MF	14	(Saudi Arabia) Bader Bashir	(Bahrain) Sitra	Free	
1 July 2022	MF	18	(Saudi Arabia) Shaye Sharahili		Released	
11 July 2022	GK	26	(Saudi Arabia) Mustafa Malayekah	(Saudi Arabia) Al-Fateh	Free	
11 July 2022	MF	37	(Brazil) Clayson	(Japan) V-Varen Nagasaki	Free	
12 July 2022	MF	77	(Saudi Arabia) Khalid Kaabi	(Saudi Arabia) Al-Fayha	Free	
20 July 2022	DF	3	(Brazil) Igor Rossi	(United Arab Emirates) Al-Ittihad Kalba	Free	
25 July 2022	FW	19	(Cape Verde) Júlio Tavares	(Saudi Arabia) Al-Raed	Free	
28 July 2022	DF	12	(Saudi Arabia) Hussain Qassem	(Saudi Arabia) Al-Tai	Undisclosed	
6 August 2022	MF	7	(Saudi Arabia) Hamoud Al-Shammari	(Saudi Arabia) Al-Jandal	Free	
6 August 2022	FW	9	(Australia) Martin Boyle	(Scotland) Hibernian	Undisclosed	
24 August 2022	FW	80	(Saudi Arabia) Mohammed Al-Saiari	(Saudi Arabia) Al-Ittihad	$665,000	
6 September 2022	MF	7	(Netherlands) Hicham Faik	(Saudi Arabia) Al-Ahli	Free	
1 January 2023	DF	77	(Saudi Arabia) Ali Maedi	(Saudi Arabia) Ohod	Free	
18 January 2023	MF	37	(Morocco) Reda Hajhouj	(Saudi Arabia) Hajer	Free	
26 January 2023	FW	9	(Brazil) Cassiano	(Portugal) Estoril	Free	

=== Loans out ===
Start date	End date	Position	No.	Player	To club	Fee	Ref.
25 July 2022	End of season	GK	–	(Saudi Arabia) Taher Al-Hajji	(Saudi Arabia) Al-Khaleej	None	
25 July 2022	End of season	FW	14	(Saudi Arabia) Saleh Al Abbas	(Saudi Arabia) Al-Khaleej	None	
4 September 2022	End of season	MF	42	(Saudi Arabia) Hamed Fallatah	(Saudi Arabia) Al-Jabalain	None	
28 January 2023	End of season	MF	70	(Saudi Arabia) Ahmed Al-Anzi	(Saudi Arabia) Najran	None	

== Pre-season ==
4 August 2022 Friendly	Al-Faisaly (Saudi Arabia)	1–4	Bahrain U23	Kartepe, Turkey
18:00 TRT	Al-Shamrani

8 August 2022 Friendly	Al-Faisaly (Saudi Arabia)	1–1	(United Arab Emirates) Dibba Al-Hisn	Kartepe, Turkey
18:00 TRT	A. Al-Qahtani	Report

12 August 2022 Friendly	Al-Faisaly (Saudi Arabia)	1–1	(Saudi Arabia) Al-Raed	Kartepe, Turkey
18:00 TRT	R. Al-Ghamdi 32'	Report	Fateh 90'

15 August 2022 Friendly	Al-Faisaly (Saudi Arabia)	2–1	(Qatar) Al-Khor	Kartepe, Turkey
18:00 TRT	Al-Shamrani; Dhafir	Report

== Competitions ==
=== First Division League ===
==== League table ====
Pos	Team	Pld	W	D	L	GF	GA	GD	Pts	Promotion, qualification or relegation
1	Al-Ahli (C, P)	34	21	9	4	48	24	+24	72	Promotion to the Pro League
2	Al-Hazem (P)	34	20	8	6	55	29	+26	68 (Note: Al-Hazem finished ahead of Al-Okhdood on head-to-head points: Al-Hazem: 6 pts, Al-Okhdood: 0 pts (Al-Hazem 1–0 Al-Okhdood, Al-Okhdood 0–1 Al-Hazem).)	Promotion to the Pro League
3	Al-Okhdood (P)	34	21	5	8	64	35	+29	68	Promotion to the Pro League
4	Al-Riyadh (P)	34	19	6	9	52	37	+15	63	Promotion to the Pro League
5	Al-Faisaly	34	16	10	8	45	32	+13	58	
6	Al-Arabi	34	13	10	11	43	43	0	49	
7	Al-Kholood	34	12	7	15	33	31	+2	43 (Note: Al-Kholood finished ahead of Hajer on overall goal difference: Al-Kholood +2, Hajer −5 (Hajer 1–0 Al-Kholood, Al-Kholood 1–0 Hajer).)	
8	Hajer	34	11	10	13	36	41	−5	43	
9	Ohod	34	10	12	12	29	38	−9	42	
10	Al-Jabalain	34	9	14	11	42	43	−1	41	
11	Al-Qadsiah	34	10	10	14	29	34	−5	40 (Note: Positions determined by head-to-head points: Al-Qadsiah: 9 pts; Al-Orobah: 7 pts; Al-Qaisumah: 1 pts.)	
12	Al-Orobah	34	11	7	16	35	41	−6	40 (Note: Al-Shoulla were awarded a 3–0 win over Al-Orobah due to Al-Orobah's inability to hold the fixture.)	
13	Al-Qaisumah	34	8	16	10	35	44	−9	40	
14	Al-Ain	34	11	6	17	34	46	−12	39	
15	Jeddah	34	10	8	16	34	40	−6	38	
16	Najran (R)	34	9	9	16	36	54	−18	36	Relegation to the Second Division
17	Al-Sahel (R)	34	7	11	16	36	51	−15	32	Relegation to the Second Division
18	Al-Shoulla (R)	34	5	8	21	23	46	−23	23	Relegation to the Second Division

Updated to match(es) played on 29 May 2023. Source: goalzz.com
Rules for classification: 1) Points; 2) Head-to-head points; 3) Head-to-head goal difference; 4) Total goal difference; 5) Total goals scored; 6) Fair-play points (Note: Head-to-head record is used only after all the matches between the teams in question have been played).
(C) Champions; (P) Promoted; (R) Relegated

==== Results summary ====
Overall								Home						Away					
Pld	W	D	L	GF	GA	GD	Pts	W	D	L	GF	GA	GD	W	D	L	GF	GA	GD
29	14	8	7	36	26	+10	50	6	3	5	20	17	+3	8	5	2	16	9	+7

Last updated: 1 May 2023.
Source: kooora.com

==== Results by round ====
Round	1	2	3	4	5	6	7	8	9	10	11	12	13	14	15	16	17	18	19	20	21	22	23	24	25	26	27	28	29	30	31	32	33	34
Ground	A	H	H	A	H	A	H	A	H	A	H	A	H	A	H	A	H	H	A	A	H	A	H	A	H	A	H	A	H	A	H	A	H	A
Result	W	W	W	L	D	W	W	W	L	W	L	D	W	D	W	W	D	L	W	L	L	D	L	D	D	D		W	W	W				
Position	4	4	3	3	3	2	1	1	1	1	1	2	1	1	1	1	1	5	4	5	5	6	6	6	6	6	6	5	5	5				

Updated to match(es) played on 1 May 2023. Source:
A = Away; H = Home; W = Win; D = Draw; L = Loss

==== Matches ====
All times are local, AST (UTC+3).

Win Draw Loss Postponed

24 August 2022 1	Al-Riyadh	1–2	Al-Faisaly	Riyadh
18:55	Miranda 58' (pen.)	Report	Al-Munaif 19' (o.g.); Al-Shamrani 79'	Stadium: King Fahd International Stadium; Referee: Bandar Al-Qahtani

31 August 2022 2	Al-Faisaly	3–1	Al-Jabalain	Al Majma'ah
18:55	Jurina 1'; Rossi 12' (pen.), 70' (pen.)	Report	Isael 2'	Stadium: Al Majma'ah Sports City; Referee: Mamdouh Al Shahdan

6 September 2022 3	Al-Faisaly	1–0	Hajer	Al Majma'ah
18:50	Al-Ahmed 21'	Report		Stadium: Al Majma'ah Sports City; Referee: Meshal Al-Shehri

12 September 2022 4	Al-Okhdood	2–1	Al-Faisaly	Najran
20:30	Barry 53', 56'	Report	Rossi 68'	Stadium: Prince Hathloul bin Abdul Aziz Sports City; Referee: Mohammed Al-Harbi

18 September 2022 5	Al-Faisaly	1–1	Al-Sahel	Al Majma'ah
18:35	Rossi 69'	Report	Al-Juraibi 82'	Stadium: Al Majma'ah Sports City; Referee: Abdulrahman Al-Sultan

5 October 2022 6	Al-Orobah	0–1	Al-Faisaly	Sakakah
18:40		Report	Hajhouj 45+2'	Stadium: Al-Orobah Club Stadium; Referee: Mohammed Abo Shaqarah

12 October 2022 7	Al-Faisaly	1–0	Al-Qaisumah	Al Majma'ah
18:10	Cassiano 62'	Report		Stadium: Al Majma'ah Sports City; Referee: Mohammed Al-Ghamdi

18 October 2022 8	Al-Kholood	0–1	Al-Faisaly	Ar Rass
19:55		Report	Ismael 47'	Stadium: Al-Hazem Club Stadium; Referee: Hussain Abo Shahin

2 November 2022 10	Najran	0–1	Al-Faisaly	Najran
19:45		Report	Cassiano 81'	Stadium: Prince Hathloul bin Abdul Aziz Sports City; Referee: Abdullah Al-Kharboush

9 November 2022 11	Al-Faisaly	2–3	Al-Arabi	Al Majma'ah
19:45	Rossi 37'; Hajhouj 58'	Report	Mbengue 16' (pen.), 52' (pen.); Sharahili 84'	Stadium: Al Majma'ah Sports City; Referee: Mohammed Al-Hoaish

15 November 2022 12	Ohod	0–0	Al-Faisaly	Medina
18:10		Report		Stadium: Ohod Club Stadium; Referee: Ahmed Al-Rumaikhani

19 December 2022 13	Al-Faisaly	3–2	Al-Hazem	Al Majma'ah
17:50	Omar 35'; Cassiano 45+7', 90+15'	Report	John 42', 90+1' (pen.)	Stadium: Al Majma'ah Sports City; Referee: Mohammed Abo Shaqqara

26 December 2022 14	Al-Qadsiah	0–0	Al-Faisaly	Khobar
17:30		Report		Stadium: Prince Saud bin Jalawi Stadium; Referee: Meshal Al-Shehri

2 January 2023 15	Al-Faisaly	2–0	Jeddah	Al Majma'ah
17:55	Cassiano 53', 90+11'	Report		Stadium: Al Majma'ah Sports City

10 January 2023 16	Al-Ain	0–1	Al-Faisaly	Al Bahah
15:50		Report	Rossi 10'	Stadium: King Saud Sport City Stadium; Referee: Hussain Abo Shahin

14 January 2023 9	Al-Faisaly	1–2	Al-Ahli	Al Majma'ah
15:30	Cassiano 45+3'	Report	Asiri 27', 45+7'	Stadium: Al Majma'ah Sports City; Referee: Turki Hashlan

18 January 2023 17	Al-Faisaly	1–1	Al-Shoulla	Al Majma'ah
15:30	Al-Qumayzi 64'	Report	Molinga 54'	Stadium: Al Majma'ah Sports City; Referee: Mohammed Al-Amri

27 January 2023 18	Al-Faisaly	0–1	Al-Riyadh	Al Majma'ah
15:40		Report	Miranda 78'	Stadium: Al Majma'ah Sports City; Referee: Abdullah Al-Dahmashi

2 February 2023 19	Al-Jabalain	1–2	Al-Faisaly	Ha'il
15:55	Isael 4'	Report	Vázquez 55', 76' (pen.)	Stadium: Prince Abdul Aziz bin Musa'ed Stadium; Referee: Abdullah Zarban

7 February 2023 20	Hajer	1–0	Al-Faisaly	Al-Hasa
15:40	Al-Qumayzi 11' (o.g.)	Report		Stadium: Hajer Club Stadium; Referee: Raed Al-Zahrani

14 February 2023 21	Al-Faisaly	1–3	Al-Okhdood	Al Majma'ah
15:50	Rossi 73'	Report	Barry 45+10' (pen.), 69'; Hkimi 84'	Stadium: Al Majma'ah Sports City; Referee: Mohammed Al-Daqqash

1 March 2023 23	Al-Faisaly	1–2	Al-Orobah	Al Majma'ah
15:55	Juma 50'	Report	Maia 78'; Rayllan 90+6'	Stadium: Al Majma'ah Sports City; Referee: Turki Hashlan

7 March 2023 24	Al-Qaisumah	1–1	Al-Faisaly	Hafar al-Batin
15:50	Djaouchi 62'	Report	Juma 69'	Stadium: Al-Batin Club Stadium; Referee: Mohammed Abo Shaqarah

12 March 2023 25	Al-Faisaly	1–1	Al-Kholood	Al Majma'ah
18:50	Vázquez 58' (pen.)	Report	Uilliam 31' (pen.)	Stadium: Al Majma'ah Sports City; Referee: Mohammed Al-Daqqash

7 April 2023 22	Al-Sahel	1–1	Al-Faisaly	Khobar
21:20	Diomandé 81'	Report	Juma 33'	Stadium: Prince Saud bin Jalawi Stadium; Referee: Abdullah Al-Dahmashi

11 April 2023 28	Al-Arabi	0–2	Al-Faisaly	Unaizah
21:50		Report	Juma 10', 87'	Stadium: Department of Education Stadium; Referee: Ahmed Al-Barakati

15 April 2023 26	Al-Ahli	2–2	Al-Faisaly	Jeddah
22:00	Boudebouz 44' (pen.), 82' (pen.)	Report	Juma 84'; Omar 88'	Stadium: Prince Abdullah Al Faisal Stadium; Referee: Meshal Al-Shehri

26 April 2023 29	Al-Faisaly	2–0	Ohod	Al Majma'ah
20:40	Vuković 2'; Juma 43'	Report		Stadium: Al Majma'ah Sports City; Referee: Mohammed Abo Shaqarah

1 May 2023 30	Al-Hazem	0–1	Al-Faisaly	Ar Rass
19:30		Report	Semedo 53'	Stadium: Al-Hazem Club Stadium; Referee: Fraih Al-Jaloud

5 May 2023 27	Al-Faisaly	2–2	Najran	Al Majma'ah
19:05				Stadium: Al Majma'ah Sports City

10 May 2023 31	Al-Faisaly	1–0	Al-Qadsiah	Al Majma'ah
19:15				Stadium: Al Majma'ah Sports City

15 May 2023 32	Jeddah	2–2	Al-Faisaly	Jeddah
20:45				Stadium: Prince Abdullah Al-Faisal Stadium

23 May 2023 33	Al-Faisaly	4–1	Al-Ain	Al Majma'ah
21:00				Stadium: Al Majma'ah Sports City

27 May 2023 34	Al-Shoulla	1–0	Al-Faisaly	Al-Kharj
21:00				Stadium: Al-Shoulla Club Stadium

=== AFC Champions League ===
==== Knockout phase ====
20 February 2023 Round of 16	Al-Faisaly (Saudi Arabia)	0–1	(Iran) Foolad	Doha, Qatar
18:00 UTC+3	Omar (yellow card) 90+4'	Report	Aghasi (yellow card) 39'; Ansari 64'; Dejagah (yellow card) 68'	Stadium: Al Thumama Stadium; Attendance: 632; Referee: Ahmed Al-Kaf (Oman)

== Statistics ==
=== Appearances ===
Last updated on 27 May 2023.

No.	Pos	Nat	Player	Total		FD League		Champions League	
No.	Pos	Nat	Player	Apps	Goals	Apps	Goals	Apps	Goals
Goalkeepers
1	GK	(Saudi Arabia) KSA	Mohammed Al-Hassawi	1	0	1	0	0	0
28	GK	(Saudi Arabia) KSA	Ahmed Al-Kassar	34	0	33	0	1	0
Defenders
2	DF	(Saudi Arabia) KSA	Abdullah Al-Hassan	1	0	0+1	0	0	0
3	DF	(Saudi Arabia) KSA	Yassin Barnawi	17	0	12+4	0	1	0
5	DF	(Saudi Arabia) KSA	Mohammed Al-Amri	26	1	25+1	1	0	0
12	DF	(Saudi Arabia) KSA	Abdulrahman Al-Rio	9	0	2+7	0	0	0
13	DF	(Saudi Arabia) KSA	Ahmed Assiri	28	0	26+1	0	1	0
17	DF	(Saudi Arabia) KSA	Saleh Al-Qumayzi	33	1	30+2	1	1	0
19	DF	(Saudi Arabia) KSA	Abdullah Al-Subait	1	0	0+1	0	0	0
50	DF	(Saudi Arabia) KSA	Ali Al-Absi	0	0	0	0	0	0
55	DF	(Saudi Arabia) KSA	Mohammed Al-Nukhylan	0	0	0	0	0	0
66	DF	(Saudi Arabia) KSA	Ali Al Sultan	13	0	9+3	0	0+1	0
78	DF	(Saudi Arabia) KSA	Khaled Daghriri	6	0	3+3	0	0	0
87	DF	(Saudi Arabia) KSA	Meshal Al-Sebyani	18	0	8+9	0	0+1	0
99	DF	(Saudi Arabia) KSA	Waleed Al-Ahmed	30	1	29	1	1	0
Midfielders
4	MF	(Croatia) CRO	Josip Vuković	18	1	17	1	1	0
6	MF	(Morocco) MAR	Omar Arjoune	29	0	28+1	0	0	0
8	MF	(Saudi Arabia) KSA	Abdulmajeed Al-Swat	6	0	2+3	0	0+1	0
11	MF	(Cape Verde) CPV	Willy Semedo	14	2	13	2	1	0
16	MF	(Saudi Arabia) KSA	Hassan Al-Shamrani	0	0	0	0	0	0
20	MF	(Saudi Arabia) KSA	Abdullah Al-Qahtani	20	1	2+17	1	0+1	0
21	MF	(Saudi Arabia) KSA	Abdulaziz Dhafir	5	0	1+4	0	0	0
25	MF	(Saudi Arabia) KSA	Ismail Omar	24	3	7+16	3	0+1	0
32	MF	(Argentina) ARG	Mariano Vázquez	19	5	18+1	5	0	0
39	MF	(Saudi Arabia) KSA	Abdulrahman Al-Dawsari	30	0	12+17	0	1	0
88	MF	(Saudi Arabia) KSA	Abdulaziz Al-Sharid	23	1	11+11	1	1	0
Forwards
22	FW	(Saudi Arabia) KSA	Ahmed Al-Shamrani	19	1	7+11	1	1	0
23	FW	(Kenya) KEN	Masoud Juma	13	8	13	8	0	0
27	FW	(Saudi Arabia) KSA	Saleh Al-Rahmani	2	1	1+1	1	0	0
Players sent out on loan this season
42	MF	(Saudi Arabia) KSA	Hamed Fallatah	0	0	0	0	0	0
70	MF	(Saudi Arabia) KSA	Ahmed Al-Anzi	0	0	0	0	0	0
Player who made an appearance this season but have left the club
7	MF	(Brazil) BRA	Ismael	9	1	6+3	1	0	0
9	FW	(Brazil) BRA	Cassiano	17	7	13+4	7	0	0
10	MF	(Brazil) BRA	Rossi	25	7	22+2	7	1	0
37	MF	(Morocco) MAR	Reda Hajhouj	12	2	10+2	2	0	0
84	FW	(Bosnia and Herzegovina) BIH	Marin Jurina	16	1	13+3	1	0	0

=== Goalscorers ===
Rank	No.	Pos	Nat	Name	FD League	Champions League	Total
1	9	FW	(Brazil)	Cassiano	7	0	7
1	10	MF	(Brazil)	Rossi	7	0	7
1	23	FW	(Kenya)	Masoud Juma	7	0	7
4	32	MF	(Argentina)	Mariano Vázquez	3	0	3
5	25	MF	(Saudi Arabia)	Ismail Omar	2	0	2
5	37	MF	(Morocco)	Reda Hajhouj	2	0	2
7	4	MF	(Croatia)	Josip Vuković	1	0	1
7	7	MF	(Brazil)	Ismael	1	0	1
7	11	MF	(Cape Verde)	Willy Semedo	1	0	1
7	17	DF	(Saudi Arabia)	Saleh Al-Qumayzi	1	0	1
7	22	FW	(Saudi Arabia)	Ahmed Al-Shamrani	1	0	1
7	84	FW	(Bosnia and Herzegovina)	Marin Jurina	1	0	1
7	99	DF	(Saudi Arabia)	Waleed Al-Ahmed	1	0	1
Own goal					1	0	1
Total					36	0	36

Last Updated: 1 May 2023

=== Assists ===
Rank	No.	Pos	Nat	Name	FD League	Champions League	Total
1	5	DF	(Saudi Arabia)	Mohammed Al-Amri	4	0	4
2	7	MF	(Brazil)	Ismael	2	0	2
2	10	MF	(Brazil)	Rossi	2	0	2
2	11	MF	(Cape Verde)	Willy Semedo	2	0	2
2	25	MF	(Saudi Arabia)	Ismail Omar	2	0	2
2	37	MF	(Morocco)	Reda Hajhouj	2	0	2
2	88	MF	(Saudi Arabia)	Abdulaziz Al-Sharid	2	0	2
8	9	FW	(Brazil)	Cassiano	1	0	1
8	22	FW	(Saudi Arabia)	Ahmed Al-Shamrani	1	0	1
8	23	FW	(Kenya)	Masoud Juma	1	0	1
8	32	MF	(Argentina)	Mariano Vázquez	1	0	1
8	87	DF	(Saudi Arabia)	Meshal Al-Sebyani	1	0	1
Total					21	0	21

Last Updated: 1 May 2023

=== Clean sheets ===
Rank	No.	Pos	Nat	Name	FD League	Champions League	Total
1	28	GK	(Saudi Arabia)	Ahmed Al-Kassar	12	0	12
Total					12	0	12

Last Updated: 1 May 2023
