= 2020–21 Al-Faisaly FC season =

Al-Faisaly
2020–21 season
- President: Fahd Al-Medlej
- Manager: Péricles Chamusca
- Stadium: Al Majma'ah Sports City
- SPL: 9th
- King Cup: Winners
- Top goalscorer: League: Júlio Tavares (15); All: Júlio Tavares (19)
- Highest home attendance: 696 vs. Al-Shabab, 23 May 2021
Home colours	Away colours	Third colours
- All statistics correct as of 30 May 2021.

The 2020–21 season was Al-Faisaly's 12th non-consecutive season in the Pro League and their 67th season in existence. The club participated in the Pro League and the King Cup.

The season covered the period from 22 September 2020 to 30 June 2021.

== Players ==
=== Squad information ===
As of 1 February 2021

Note: Flags indicate national team as defined under FIFA eligibility rules; some limited exceptions apply. Players may hold more than one non-FIFA nationality.

No.	Pos.	Nation	Player
1	GK	(Saudi Arabia) KSA	Mohammed Al-Hassawi
2	DF	(Saudi Arabia) KSA	Abdullah Al-Hassan
3	DF	(Brazil) BRA	Igor Rossi
4	DF	(Brazil) BRA	Raphael Silva
6	MF	(Netherlands) NED	Hicham Faik
8	MF	(Saudi Arabia) KSA	Khaled Al-Sumairi (on loan from Al-Ittihad)
11	MF	(Brazil) BRA	Guilherme
12	MF	(Saudi Arabia) KSA	Shaye Sharahili
13	DF	(Saudi Arabia) KSA	Ali Al-Absi
14	DF	(Saudi Arabia) KSA	Ali Majrashi (on loan from Al-Shabab)
15	MF	(Saudi Arabia) KSA	Ahmed Ashraf
17	DF	(Saudi Arabia) KSA	Mohammed Al-Nukhylan
18	DF	(Saudi Arabia) KSA	Mohammed Qassem
19	FW	(Cape Verde) CPV	Júlio Tavares
23	MF	(France) FRA	Romain Amalfitano

No.	Pos.	Nation	Player
24	DF	(Saudi Arabia) KSA	Waleed Al-Ahmed
25	MF	(Saudi Arabia) KSA	Ismail Omar
26	GK	(Saudi Arabia) KSA	Mustafa Malayekah
27	DF	(Saudi Arabia) KSA	Awadh Khrees
28	GK	(Saudi Arabia) KSA	Ahmed Al-Kassar
30	GK	(Saudi Arabia) KSA	Sultan Al-Qahtani
47	MF	(Saudi Arabia) KSA	Mustafa Bassas
51	DF	(Saudi Arabia) KSA	Hussain Qassem
52	MF	(Kazakhstan) KAZ	Alexander Merkel
70	MF	(Saudi Arabia) KSA	Ahmed Al-Anzi
77	MF	(Saudi Arabia) KSA	Khalid Kaabi
78	DF	(Saudi Arabia) KSA	Khaled Daghriri
80	FW	(Saudi Arabia) KSA	Mohammed Al-Saiari
87	MF	(Saudi Arabia) KSA	Meshal Al-Sebyani
88	MF	(Saudi Arabia) KSA	Abdulaziz Al-Sharid

=== Out on loan ===
Note: Flags indicate national team as defined under FIFA eligibility rules; some limited exceptions apply. Players may hold more than one non-FIFA nationality.

No.	Pos.	Nation	Player
5	MF	(Saudi Arabia) KSA	Hussain Al Quraish (at Al-Nahda until 30 June 2021)
7	MF	(Saudi Arabia) KSA	Hamoud Al-Shammari (at Al-Jeel until 30 June 2021)
10	MF	(Saudi Arabia) KSA	Abdullah Al-Qahtani (at Abha until 30 June 2021)
14	MF	(Saudi Arabia) KSA	Bader Bashir (at Hajer until 30 June 2021)
20	MF	(Saudi Arabia) KSA	Yasser Safhi (at Al-Nahda until 30 June 2021)

No.	Pos.	Nation	Player
22	GK	(Saudi Arabia) KSA	Taher Al-Hajji (at Al-Khaleej until 30 June 2021)
42	MF	(Saudi Arabia) KSA	Hamed Fallatah (at Al-Nahda until 30 June 2021)
—	DF	(Saudi Arabia) KSA	Hassan Al-Jubairi (at Al-Tai until 30 June 2021)
—	DF	(Saudi Arabia) KSA	Adel Hazazi (at Al-Diriyah until 30 June 2021)
—	DF	(Saudi Arabia) KSA	Ali Meadi (at Abha until 30 June 2021)

== Transfers and loans ==
=== Transfers in ===
Entry date	Position	No.	Player	From club	Fee	Ref.
22 September 2020	GK	1	(Saudi Arabia) Mohammed Al-Hassawi	(Saudi Arabia) Abha	Free	
22 September 2020	GK	22	(Saudi Arabia) Taher Al-Hejji	(Saudi Arabia) Al-Adalah	Free	
22 September 2020	DF	23	(Saudi Arabia) Awadh Khrees	(Saudi Arabia) Al-Adalah	End of loan	
22 September 2020	DF	51	(Saudi Arabia) Hussain Qassem	(Saudi Arabia) Al-Ettifaq	Free	
22 September 2020	DF	–	(Saudi Arabia) Hassan Al-Jubairi	(Saudi Arabia) Jeddah	Free	
22 September 2020	DF	–	(Saudi Arabia) Hussein Hawsawi	(Saudi Arabia) Al-Taqadom	End of loan	
22 September 2020	MF	6	(Netherlands) Hicham Faik	(Netherlands) Heerenveen	$825,000	
22 September 2020	MF	10	(Saudi Arabia) Abdullah Al-Qahtani	(Saudi Arabia) Abha	End of loan	
22 September 2020	MF	12	(Saudi Arabia) Shaye Sharahili	Unattached	Free	
22 September 2020	MF	20	(Saudi Arabia) Yasser Safhi	(Saudi Arabia) Al-Thoqbah	Undisclosed	
22 September 2020	MF	25	(Saudi Arabia) Ismail Omar	(Saudi Arabia) Jeddah	Free	
22 September 2020	MF	42	(Saudi Arabia) Hamed Fallatah	(Saudi Arabia) Al-Nahda	Free	
22 September 2020	MF	52	(Kazakhstan) Alexander Merkel	(Netherlands) Heracles Almelo	Free	
22 September 2020	MF	–	(Saudi Arabia) Mohammed Al-Thani	(Saudi Arabia) Al-Ittihad	End of loan	
22 September 2020	MF	–	(Saudi Arabia) Bader Bashir	(Saudi Arabia) Al-Qadsiah	End of loan	
22 September 2020	FW	19	(Cape Verde) Júlio Tavares	(France) Dijon	$1,175,000	
22 September 2020	FW	80	(Saudi Arabia) Mohammed Al-Saiari	(Saudi Arabia) Al-Wehda	Undisclosed	
25 September 2020	MF	88	(Saudi Arabia) Abdulaziz Al-Sharid	(Saudi Arabia) Al-Batin	Free	
10 October 2020	DF	24	(Saudi Arabia) Waleed Al-Ahmed	(Saudi Arabia) Al-Hilal	Free	
25 October 2020	MF	15	(Saudi Arabia) Ahmed Ashraf	(Saudi Arabia) Al-Hilal	$800,000	
25 October 2020	MF	23	(France) Romain Amalfitano	(France) Dijon	Undisclosed	

=== Loans in ===
Start date	End date	Position	No.	Player	From club	Fee	Ref.
27 January 2021	End of season	MF	8	(Saudi Arabia) Khaled Al-Sumairi	(Saudi Arabia) Al-Ittihad	None	
7 February 2021	End of season	DF	14	(Saudi Arabia) Ali Majrashi	(Saudi Arabia) Al-Shabab	None	

=== Transfers out ===
Exit date	Position	No.	Player	To club	Fee	Ref.
22 September 2020	DF	12	(Saudi Arabia) Khalid Al-Ghamdi	(Saudi Arabia) Al-Shabab	Free	
22 September 2020	DF	21	(Saudi Arabia) Ageel Balghaith	(Saudi Arabia) Al-Raed	Free	
22 September 2020	MF	7	(Curaçao) Roly Bonevacia	(United Arab Emirates) Al-Fujairah	Free	
22 September 2020	MF	10	(Saudi Arabia) Hussain Al-Qahtani	(Saudi Arabia) Al-Shabab	Free	
22 September 2020	MF	17	(Saudi Arabia) Ahmed Ashraf	(Saudi Arabia) Al-Hilal	End of loan	
23 September 2020	MF	34	(Netherlands) Youssef El Jebli	(Saudi Arabia) Al-Batin	$107,000	
23 September 2020	MF	88	(Trinidad and Tobago) Khaleem Hyland	(Saudi Arabia) Al-Batin	Free	
29 September 2020	DF	5	(Saudi Arabia) Hussein Hawsawi	(Saudi Arabia) Al-Jabalain	Free	
5 October 2020	FW	15	(Saudi Arabia) Ramzi Solan	(Saudi Arabia) Damac	Undisclosed	
7 October 2020	MF	55	(Saudi Arabia) Moshari Al-Thamali	(Saudi Arabia) Al-Tai	Free	
9 October 2020	FW	9	(Brazil) William Oliveira	(Saudi Arabia) Al-Fayha	Free	
28 October 2020	MF	–	(Saudi Arabia) Mohammed Al-Thani	(Saudi Arabia) Ohod	Free	

=== Loans out ===
Start date	End date	Position	No.	Player	To club	Fee	Ref.
23 September 2020	End of season	MF	–	(Saudi Arabia) Bader Bashir	(Saudi Arabia) Hajer	None	
28 September 2020	End of season	DF	13	(Saudi Arabia) Ali Meadi	(Saudi Arabia) Abha	None	
9 October 2020	End of season	MF	5	(Saudi Arabia) Hussain Al Quraish	(Saudi Arabia) Al-Nahda	None	
12 October 2020	End of season	DF	–	(Saudi Arabia) Adel Hazazi	(Saudi Arabia) Al-Diriyah	None	
25 October 2020	End of season	DF	–	(Saudi Arabia) Hassan Al-Jubairi	(Saudi Arabia) Al-Tai	None	
22 January 2021	End of season	MF	42	(Saudi Arabia) Hamed Fallatah	(Saudi Arabia) Al-Nahda	None	
27 January 2021	End of season	MF	10	(Saudi Arabia) Abdullah Al-Qahtani	(Saudi Arabia) Abha	None	
7 February 2021	End of season	GK	22	(Saudi Arabia) Taher Al-Hejji	(Saudi Arabia) Al-Khaleej	None	
7 February 2021	End of season	MF	7	(Saudi Arabia) Hamoud Al-Shammari	(Saudi Arabia) Al-Jeel	None	

== Pre-season ==
22 September 2020 Friendly	Al-Raed (Saudi Arabia)	1–1	(Saudi Arabia) Al-Faisaly	Buraidah, Saudi Arabia
18:30 AST	Al-Ghamdi 40'	Report	Silva 60'	Stadium: King Abdullah Sport City Stadium

26 September 2020 Friendly	Al-Shabab (Saudi Arabia)	2–2	(Saudi Arabia) Al-Faisaly	Riyadh, Saudi Arabia
18:30 AST	Guanca 45+1', 49'	Report	Merkel 8'; Guilherme 18'	Stadium: Prince Khalid bin Sultan Stadium

1 October 2020 Friendly	Al-Ittihad (Saudi Arabia)	2–2	(Saudi Arabia) Al-Faisaly	Jeddah, Saudi Arabia
17:00 AST	Al-Muwallad 33' (pen.); Romarinho 37'	Report	Tavares 51'; Omar 78'	Stadium: Al-Ittihad Club Stadium

4 October 2020 Friendly	Al-Wehda (Saudi Arabia)	0–0	(Saudi Arabia) Al-Faisaly	Jeddah, Saudi Arabia
AST		Report		Stadium: King Abdullah Sports City Reserve Stadium

9 October 2020 Friendly	Al-Faisaly (Saudi Arabia)	1–2	(Saudi Arabia) Al-Shabab	Al Majma'ah, Saudi Arabia
18:25 AST	Al-Saiari 34'	Report	Majrashi 55'; Salem 90'	Stadium: Al Majma'ah Sports City

== Competitions ==
=== Overview ===
Competition	Record							
Competition	G	W	D	L	GF	GA	GD	Win %
Pro League	30	9	9	12	42	47	−5	30.00
King Cup	4	3	1	0	6	3	+3	75.00
Total	34	12	10	12	48	50	−2	35.29

Updated to match played 30 May 2021
Source: Competitions

=== Pro League ===
==== League table ====
Pos	Team	Pld	W	D	L	GF	GA	GD	Pts	Qualification or relegation
7	Al-Fateh	30	12	6	12	55	55	0	42	
8	Al-Ahli	30	11	6	13	44	56	−12	39	
9	Al-Faisaly	30	9	9	12	42	47	−5	36 (Note: Positions determined by head-to-head points: Al-Faisaly: 16 pts; Al-Raed: 15 pts; Damac: 13 pts; Al-Batin: 12 pts; Abha: 3 pts.)	Qualification for the Champions League group stage (Note: Al-Faisaly qualified for the Champions League group stage as 2020–21 King Cup winners.)
10	Al-Raed	30	10	6	14	44	47	−3	36	
11	Damac	30	9	9	12	43	48	−5	36	

Source: spl.com source=إحصائيات رابطة دوري المحترفين السعودي 2020-2021
Rules for classification: 1) Points; 2) Head-to-head points; 3) Head-to-head goal difference; 4) Total goal difference; 5) Total goals scored; 6) Fair-play points (Note: Head-to-head record is used only after all the matches between the teams in question have been played).

==== Results summary ====
Overall								Home						Away					
Pld	W	D	L	GF	GA	GD	Pts	W	D	L	GF	GA	GD	W	D	L	GF	GA	GD
30	9	9	12	42	47	−5	36	4	5	6	20	27	−7	5	4	6	22	20	+2

Last updated: 30 May 2021.
Source: spl.com.sa

==== Results by round ====
Round	1	2	3	4	5	6	7	8	9	10	11	12	13	14	15	16	17	18	19	20	21	22	23	24	25	26	27	28	29	30
Ground	A	H	A	A	H	A	H	A	H	A	H	A	H	A	H	H	A	H	H	A	H	A	H	A	H	A	H	A	H	A
Result	D	W	W	D	D	L	D	W	L	L	L	L	D	D	D	D	W	L	W	W	W	D	L	L	L	L	W	W	L	L
Position	8	5	3	4	6	7	5	5	7	9	11	12	12	12	13	14	11	12	12	10	8	8	9	11	12	12	9	9	9	9

Updated to match(es) played on 30 May 2021. Source: spl.com.sa
A = Away; H = Home; W = Win; D = Draw; L = Loss

==== Matches ====
All times are local, AST (UTC+3).

Win Draw Loss Postponed

17 October 2020 1	Al-Taawoun	1–1	Al-Faisaly	Buraidah
18:10	Santos 2'; Assiri (yellow card) 22'; Darwish (yellow card) 44'; Al-Jouei (yellow card) 55'	Report	Merkel (yellow card) 40'; Faik (yellow card) 47'; Al-Sharid (yellow card) 78'; Rossi 80'	Stadium: King Abdullah Sport City Stadium; Attendance: 0 Referee: Faisal Al-Blwi

23 October 2020 2	Al-Faisaly	2–1	Al-Batin	Al Majma'ah
19:55	Al-Anezi (yellow card) 17'; Tavares 29'; Daghriri (yellow card) 61'; Al-Saiari 75'	Report	Raghfawi (yellow card) 13'; Sharahili 46'; Chaves (yellow card) 90+3'	Stadium: Al Majma'ah Sports City; Attendance: 0 Referee: Shukri Al-Hanfoush

30 October 2020 3	Al-Wehda	1–2	Al-Faisaly	Mecca
19:50	Niakaté 6'; Henrique (yellow card) 45+5'; Al-Khulaif (yellow card) 86'; Anselmo (yellow card) 88'	Report	Tavares 19'; M. Qassem (yellow card) 45+1'; Fallatah (yellow card) 62'; Al-Qahtani 75'	Stadium: King Abdul Aziz Stadium; Attendance: 0 Referee: Khaled Al-Teris

6 November 2020 4	Damac	0–0	Al-Faisaly	Abha
15:35	Chafaï (yellow card) 57'	Report	Merkel (yellow card) 16'; Al-Nukhylan (yellow card) 22'; Al-Ahmed (yellow card) 58'; Rossi (yellow card) 66'; Al-Sebyani (yellow card) 81'	Stadium: Prince Sultan bin Abdul Aziz Stadium; Attendance: 0 Referee: Sultan Al-Harbi

23 November 2020 5	Al-Faisaly	1–1	Al-Ittihad	Al Majma'ah
17:45	Amalfitano (yellow card) 28'; M. Qassem (yellow card) 30'; Rossi (yellow card) 38'; Guilherme 90+2'	Report	Romarinho 44'; Al-Malki (yellow card) 64'; Al-Swat (yellow card) 85'; Camara (yellow card) 87'	Stadium: Al Majma'ah Sports City; Attendance: 0 Referee: Faisal Al-Blwi

29 November 2020 6	Al-Ahli	2–1	Al-Faisaly	Jeddah
19:40	Al Somah (yellow card) 18', (goal) 28'; Hindi (yellow card) 64'; Mitriță 69'; Fejsa (yellow card) 72'	Report	Daghriri (yellow card) 14'; Amalfitano (yellow card) 86'; Tavares 90+5' (pen.)	Stadium: King Abdullah Sports City; Attendance: 0 Referee: Shukri Al-Hanfoush

5 December 2020 7	Al-Faisaly	1–1	Al-Ain	Al Majma'ah
17:45	Rossi (yellow card) 8'; Silva 35'; Merkel (yellow card) 62'; Faik (yellow card) 77'; Al-Saiari (yellow card) 82'	Report	Al-Qeshtah (yellow card) 34'; Moutari 54'	Stadium: Al Majma'ah Sports City; Attendance: 0 Referee: Sultan Al-Harbi

11 December 2020 8	Al-Raed	0–2	Al-Faisaly	Buraidah
17:50	Al-Fahad (yellow card) 71'; Al-Sahli (yellow card) 90'	Report	Al-Showaish 30' (o.g.); Tavares (yellow card) 61'; Guilherme 85'	Stadium: King Abdullah Sport City Stadium; Attendance: 0 Referee: Abdullah Al-Shehri

22 December 2020 9	Al-Faisaly	0–3	Al-Ettifaq	Al Majma'ah
17:50	M. Qassem (yellow card) 39'; Merkel (yellow card) 43'; Silva (yellow card) 74'; Rossi (yellow card) 90+7'; Guilherme (yellow card) 90+7'	Report	Sliti 24'; Kiss 69' (pen.); Al-Ghamdi (yellow card) 90'; Azaro 90+5'	Stadium: Al Majma'ah Sports City; Attendance: 0 Referee: Turki Al-Khudhayr

27 December 2020 10	Al-Fateh	3–2	Al-Faisaly	Al-Hasa
17:35	Al-Zaqaan 18', 45+1'; Batna 35'; Otaif (yellow card) 69'; Saâdane (yellow card) 70'; Bendebka (red card) 85'; Buhimed (yellow card) 90+4'	Report	Al-Sharid (yellow card) 38'; Al-Saiari 72'; Tavares 72'; Omar (yellow card) 79'; H. Qassem (yellow card) 90+6'	Stadium: Prince Abdullah bin Jalawi Stadium; Attendance: 0 Referee: Sami Al-Jires

31 December 2020 11	Al-Faisaly	2–3	Al-Nassr	Al Majma'ah
17:55	Al-Saiari (yellow card) 35'; Silva (yellow card) 49'; Tavares 69', 85' (pen.)	Report	Petros (yellow card) 14'; Amrabat 25'; S. Al-Ghanam 40'; Maicon (yellow card) 80'; Al-Obaid (yellow card) 80'; Al-Ghamdi 86'	Stadium: Al Majma'ah Sports City; Attendance: 0 Referee: Faisal Al-Blwi

7 January 2021 12	Abha	1–0	Al-Faisaly	Abha
15:50	Aouadhi 85'	Report	Daghriri (yellow card) 40'; Rossi (yellow card) 51'	Stadium: Prince Sultan bin Abdul Aziz Stadium; Attendance: 0 Referee: Sultan Al-Harbi

14 January 2021 13	Al-Faisaly	2–2	Al-Qadsiah	Al Majma'ah
15:30	Tavares 13' (pen.); Silva (yellow card) 36'; Malayekah (yellow card) 54'; Guilherme 60'	Report	Asprilla (yellow card) 37'; Al-Amri 55' (pen.); Al-Shangeati 88'	Stadium: Al Majma'ah Sports City; Attendance: 0 Referee: Shukri Al-Hanfoush

19 January 2021 14	Al-Shabab	1–1	Al-Faisaly	Riyadh
18:10	Martins 34', (yellow card) 58'	Report	Ashraf 7'; M. Qassem (yellow card) 44'; Rossi (yellow card) 61'; Silva (yellow card) 90'	Stadium: Prince Khalid bin Sultan Stadium; Attendance: 0 Referee: Ahmad Al-Rumaikhani

25 January 2021 15	Al-Faisaly	1–1	Al-Hilal	Al Majma'ah
18:15	Guilherme (yellow card) 45+2'; Tavares 83' (pen.); Malayekah (yellow card) 88'	Report	Gomis 20'; Giovinco (yellow card) 39'; Al-Shahrani (yellow card) 82'	Stadium: Al Majma'ah Sports City; Attendance: 0 Referee: Raed Al-Zahrani

30 January 2021 16	Al-Faisaly	0–0	Al-Taawoun	Al Majma'ah
15:40	Rossi (yellow card) 73'; Al-Saiari (yellow card) 83'	Report	Santos (yellow card) 26'; Tawamba (yellow card) 45+2'; Abousaban (yellow card) 86'	Stadium: Al Majma'ah Sports City; Attendance: 0 Referee: Abdullah Al-Shehri

5 February 2021 17	Al-Batin	0–2	Al-Faisaly	Hafar al-Batin
15:40	Sami (yellow card) 56'	Report	Tavares 6', 23'; Merkel (yellow card) 29'; Ashraf (yellow card) 64'	Stadium: Al-Batin Club Stadium; Attendance: 0 Referee: Sami Al-Jires

12 February 2021 18	Al-Faisaly	2–4	Al-Wehda	Al Majma'ah
15:45	Malayekah (yellow card) 12'; Merkel (yellow card) 33'; Silva 54'; Al-Saiari 67'	Report	Niakaté 12' (pen.), 48', 85'; Hazazi (yellow card) 14'; Al-Sqoor (yellow card) 16'; Botía (yellow card) 80'; Petratos 90'	Stadium: Al Majma'ah Sports City; Attendance: 0 Referee: Mohammed Al-Nuhait

18 February 2021 19	Al-Faisaly	2–0	Damac	Al Majma'ah
15:50	Amalfitano 12'; Al-Hassan (yellow card) 25'; Tavares 28'	Report	Harzan (yellow card) 66'; Vittor (yellow card) 77'; Munshi (yellow card) 81'	Stadium: Al Majma'ah Sports City; Attendance: 0 Referee: Mohammed Al-Beredi

23 February 2021 20	Al-Ittihad	1–3	Al-Faisaly	Mecca
19:00	Romarinho 28'; Al Mansor (yellow card) 55'; Hegazi (yellow card) 88'	Report	Silva (yellow card) 10'; Al-Ahmed (yellow card) 38'; Al Mansor 73' (o.g.); Tavares 82'; Merkel 90+3'	Stadium: King Abdul Aziz Stadium; Attendance: 0 Referee: Khaled Al-Teris

27 February 2021 21	Al-Faisaly	2–1	Al-Ahli	Al Majma'ah
20:30	Tavares (yellow card) 67', (goal) 83' (pen.); M. Qassem (yellow card) 70'; Al-Saiari 90+2'	Report	Ghareeb (yellow card) 41'; Mendash 49'; Al-Moasher (yellow card) 88'; Hassoun (yellow card) 90+2'; Hindi (yellow card) 90+7'	Stadium: Al Majma'ah Sports City; Attendance: 0 Referee: Ahmad Al-Rumaikhani

5 March 2021 22	Al-Ain	1–1	Al-Faisaly	Al Bahah
16:15	Moutari 15'; Al-Harbi (yellow card) 65'; Kabi (yellow card) 75'; Juanpi (yellow card) 90+2'	Report	Al-Saiari (yellow card) 37'; Guilherme 38'; Majrashi (yellow card) 69'	Stadium: King Saud Sport City Stadium; Attendance: 0 Referee: Shukri Al-Hanfoush

10 March 2021 23	Al-Faisaly	0–1	Al-Raed	Al Majma'ah
20:15	Majrashi (yellow card) 28'; Merkel (yellow card) 86'	Report	Fernández 71'; Marin (yellow card) 74'; Al-Sahli (yellow card) 90+2'	Stadium: Al Majma'ah Sports City; Attendance: 0 Referee: Mohammed Al-Hoaish

20 March 2021 24	Al-Ettifaq	1–0	Al-Faisaly	Dammam
18:30	Azaro (yellow card) 38', (goal) 82'; Ghazi (yellow card) 71'	Report	Silva (yellow card) 48'; Faik (yellow card) 78'; Malayekah (yellow card) 84'; Rossi (yellow card) 90+1'	Stadium: Prince Mohamed bin Fahd Stadium; Attendance: 0 Referee: Abdullah Al-Shehri

10 April 2021 25	Al-Faisaly	2–3	Al-Fateh	Al Majma'ah
18:55	Tavares 19'; Al-Ahmed (yellow card) 34'; Faik 50'	Report	Lajami 23'; Saâdane (yellow card) 47' te Vrede 68'; Batna (yellow card) 70'; Cueva 90+3'	Stadium: Al Majma'ah Sports City; Attendance: 0 Referee: Khaled Al-Teris

29 April 2021 28	Al-Qadsiah	1–2	Al-Faisaly	Khobar
21:35	Stanley (yellow card) 13'; Al-Shoeil (yellow card) 24'; Al-Amri 74' (pen.)	Report	Guilherme 32', 90+6'; Kaabi (yellow card) 35' (yellow-red card) 66'	Stadium: Prince Saud bin Jalawi Stadium; Attendance: 0 Referee: Rédouane Jiyed (Morocco)

5 May 2021 26	Al-Nassr	4–3	Al-Faisaly	Riyadh
21:40	Amrabat 1', 49' (pen.), (yellow card) 20'; Al-Najei 15', (yellow card) 80'; Petros 40'; Maran (yellow card) 85' (yellow-red card) 90+7'; Abdullah (yellow card) 90+3'; S. Al-Ghanam (yellow card) 90+6'	Report	Guilherme 12'; Faik 27'; Merkel (yellow card) 45'; Silva 88'; Majrashi (yellow card) 90'; H. Qassem (yellow card) 90+7'	Stadium: Mrsool Park; Attendance: 0 Referee: Ahmad Al-Rumaikhani

14 May 2021 27	Al-Faisaly	2–1	Abha	Al Majma'ah
19:15	Al-Saiari 79', 86', (yellow card) 86'	Report	Al-Jumeiah (yellow card) 19'; Al-Sharari (yellow card) 40'; Tatar 63', (yellow card) 63'; Al-Barakah (yellow card) 84'; Atouchi (yellow card) 87'	Stadium: Al Majma'ah Sports City; Attendance: 0 Referee: Raed Al-Zahrani

23 May 2021 29	Al-Faisaly	1–5	Al-Shabab	Al Majma'ah
21:00	Faik 23'; Silva (yellow card) 57'; Al-Saiari (yellow card) 88'	Report	Salem (yellow card) 31'; Al-Harbi 43'; Sebá 59'; Guanca 79'; Martins 90'; Ighalo 90+5'	Stadium: Al Majma'ah Sports City; Attendance: 696; Referee: Jean-Jacques Ndala (DR Congo)

30 May 2021 30	Al-Hilal	3–2	Al-Faisaly	Riyadh
21:00	Giovinco (yellow card) 15', (goal) 27'; Jang Hyun-soo (yellow card) 33'; S. Al-Dawsari 59' (pen.); Al-Hamdan 69', (yellow card) 84'	Report	Guilherme 29'; Merkel (yellow card) 63'; Tavares 90+4' (pen.)	Stadium: King Fahd International Stadium; Attendance: 15,245; Referee: Khaled Salwi

=== King Cup ===
All times are local, AST (UTC+3).

17 December 2020 Round of 16	Al-Ettifaq	0–0 (8–9 p)	Al-Faisaly	Dammam
17:25	Doukara (yellow card) 10'; Hazazi (yellow card) 34'; Ghazi (yellow card) 104'	Report	Guilherme (yellow card) 78'; Silva (yellow card) 107'	Stadium: Prince Mohamed bin Fahd Stadium; Attendance: 0 Referee: Mohammed Al-Hoaish
	Penalties
	Kiss (penalty scored); Souza (penalty scored); Sliti (penalty scored); Al-Kwikbi (penalty missed); Al-Ghamdi (penalty scored); Ghazi (penalty scored); Azaro (penalty scored); Mets (penalty scored); Al-Qumaizi (penalty scored); Mahnashi (penalty missed)		(penalty scored) Tavares; (penalty scored) Guilherme; (penalty missed) Faik; (penalty scored) Al-Sharid; (penalty scored) Al-Saiari; (penalty scored) Rossi; (penalty scored) Silva; (penalty scored) Omar; (penalty scored) Qassem; (penalty scored) Al-Kassar

15 March 2021 Quarter-finals	Al-Batin	1–2	Al-Faisaly	Hafar al-Batin
18:45	Sami (yellow card) 4', (goal) 36'; Schenk (yellow card) 24' (yellow-red card) 90+1'; Al-Mozairib (yellow card) 60'	Report	Al-Saiari 5', 78'; Majrashi (yellow card) 32'; Al-Sharid (yellow card) 45+1'; Kaabi (yellow card) 71'	Stadium: Al-Batin Club Stadium; Attendance: 0 Referee: Faisal Al-Blwi

4 April 2021 Semi-finals	Al-Nassr	0–1	Al-Faisaly	Riyadh
21:00	Madu (yellow card) 68'; Hamdallah (yellow card) 79'; Al-Ghannam (yellow card) 85'	Report	Rossi (red card) 9'; Guilherme (yellow card) 45+4'; Tavares 81' (pen.); Al-Kassar (yellow card) 90+4'; Silva (yellow card) 90+7'	Stadium: Mrsool Park; Attendance: 0 Referee: Mohammed Al-Hoaish

27 May 2021 Final	Al-Taawoun	2–3	Al-Faisaly	Riyadh
21:00	Tawamba 14'; Assiri (yellow card) 39'; Kaku 45' (pen.); Al-Nabit (yellow card) 51'; Amissi (yellow card) 65'	Report	Tavares 40' (pen.), 60', 90+3'; Omar (yellow card) 71'; Majrashi (yellow card) 86'	Stadium: King Fahd International Stadium; Referee: Szymon Marciniak (Poland)

== Statistics ==
=== Appearances ===
Last updated on 30 May 2021.

No.	Pos	Nat	Player	Total		Pro League		King Cup	
No.	Pos	Nat	Player	Apps	Goals	Apps	Goals	Apps	Goals
Goalkeepers
1	GK	(Saudi Arabia) KSA	Mohammed Al-Hassawi	0	0	0	0	0	0
26	GK	(Saudi Arabia) KSA	Mustafa Malayekah	27	0	27	0	0	0
28	GK	(Saudi Arabia) KSA	Ahmed Al-Kassar	7	0	3	0	4	0
Defenders
2	DF	(Saudi Arabia) KSA	Abdullah Al-Hassan	19	0	16+2	0	1	0
3	DF	(Brazil) BRA	Igor Rossi	28	1	25	1	3	0
4	DF	(Brazil) BRA	Raphael Silva	29	3	26	3	3	0
14	DF	(Saudi Arabia) KSA	Ali Majrashi	14	0	7+4	0	3	0
17	DF	(Saudi Arabia) KSA	Mohammed Al-Nukhylan	3	0	1+1	0	0+1	0
18	DF	(Saudi Arabia) KSA	Mohammed Qassem	31	0	27	0	4	0
24	DF	(Saudi Arabia) KSA	Waleed Al-Ahmed	18	0	10+5	0	1+2	0
27	DF	(Saudi Arabia) KSA	Awadh Khrees	1	0	0+1	0	0	0
51	DF	(Saudi Arabia) KSA	Hussain Qassem	14	0	2+9	0	0+3	0
78	DF	(Saudi Arabia) KSA	Khaled Daghriri	10	0	7+2	0	0+1	0
Midfielders
6	MF	(Netherlands) NED	Hicham Faik	32	3	27+1	3	4	0
8	MF	(Saudi Arabia) KSA	Khaled Al-Sumairi	12	0	3+8	0	0+1	0
11	MF	(Brazil) BRA	Guilherme	32	8	27+2	8	3	0
12	MF	(Saudi Arabia) KSA	Shaye Sharahili	4	0	0+2	0	0+2	0
15	MF	(Saudi Arabia) KSA	Ahmed Ashraf	21	1	18+2	1	1	0
23	MF	(France) FRA	Romain Amalfitano	26	1	21+2	1	3	0
25	MF	(Saudi Arabia) KSA	Ismail Omar	19	0	5+11	0	1+2	0
47	MF	(Saudi Arabia) KSA	Mustafa Bassas	4	0	0+4	0	0	0
52	MF	(Kazakhstan) KAZ	Alexander Merkel	31	1	26+1	1	4	0
70	MF	(Saudi Arabia) KSA	Ahmed Al-Anzi	5	0	3+2	0	0	0
77	MF	(Saudi Arabia) KSA	Khalid Kaabi	17	0	8+6	0	2+1	0
87	MF	(Saudi Arabia) KSA	Meshal Al-Sebyani	6	0	0+4	0	1+1	0
88	MF	(Saudi Arabia) KSA	Abdulaziz Al-Sharid	16	0	7+6	0	1+2	0
Forwards
19	FW	(Cape Verde) CPV	Júlio Tavares	34	19	29+1	15	4	4
80	FW	(Saudi Arabia) KSA	Mohammed Al-Saiari	22	8	4+16	6	1+1	2
Players sent out on loan this season
7	MF	(Saudi Arabia) KSA	Hamoud Al-Shammari	0	0	0	0	0	0
10	MF	(Saudi Arabia) KSA	Abdullah Al-Qahtani	5	1	1+4	1	0	0
42	MF	(Saudi Arabia) KSA	Hamed Fallatah	2	0	0+2	0	0	0

=== Goalscorers ===
Rank	No.	Pos	Nat	Name	Pro League	King Cup	Total
1	19	FW	(Cape Verde)	Júlio Tavares	15	4	19
2	11	MF	(Brazil)	Guilherme	8	0	8
2	80	FW	(Saudi Arabia)	Mohammed Al-Saiari	6	2	8
4	4	DF	(Brazil)	Raphael Silva	3	0	3
4	6	MF	(Netherlands)	Hicham Faik	3	0	3
6	3	DF	(Brazil)	Igor Rossi	1	0	1
6	10	MF	(Saudi Arabia)	Abdullah Al-Qahtani	1	0	1
6	15	MF	(Saudi Arabia)	Ahmed Ashraf	1	0	1
6	23	MF	(France)	Romain Amalfitano	1	0	1
6	52	MF	(Kazakhstan)	Alexander Merkel	1	0	1
Own goal					2	0	2
Total					42	6	48

Last Updated: 30 May 2021

=== Assists ===
Rank	No.	Pos	Nat	Name	Pro League	King Cup	Total
1	11	MF	(Brazil)	Guilherme	5	1	6
2	19	FW	(Cape Verde)	Júlio Tavares	5	0	5
3	6	MF	(Netherlands)	Hicham Faik	4	0	4
3	77	MF	(Saudi Arabia)	Khalid Kaabi	2	2	4
5	23	MF	(France)	Romain Amalfitano	3	0	3
6	25	MF	(Saudi Arabia)	Ismail Omar	2	0	2
6	52	MF	(Kazakhstan)	Alexander Merkel	2	0	2
8	15	MF	(Saudi Arabia)	Ahmed Ashraf	1	0	1
8	18	DF	(Saudi Arabia)	Mohammed Qassem	1	0	1
8	80	FW	(Saudi Arabia)	Mohammed Al-Saiari	1	0	1
Total					26	3	29

Last Updated: 30 May 2021

=== Clean sheets ===
Rank	No.	Pos	Nat	Name	Pro League	King Cup	Total
1	26	GK	(Saudi Arabia)	Mustafa Malayekah	4	0	4
2	28	GK	(Saudi Arabia)	Ahmed Al-Kassar	1	2	3
Total					5	2	7

Last Updated: 4 April 2021
