= 2021 Saudi Super Cup =

2021 Berain Saudi Super Cup
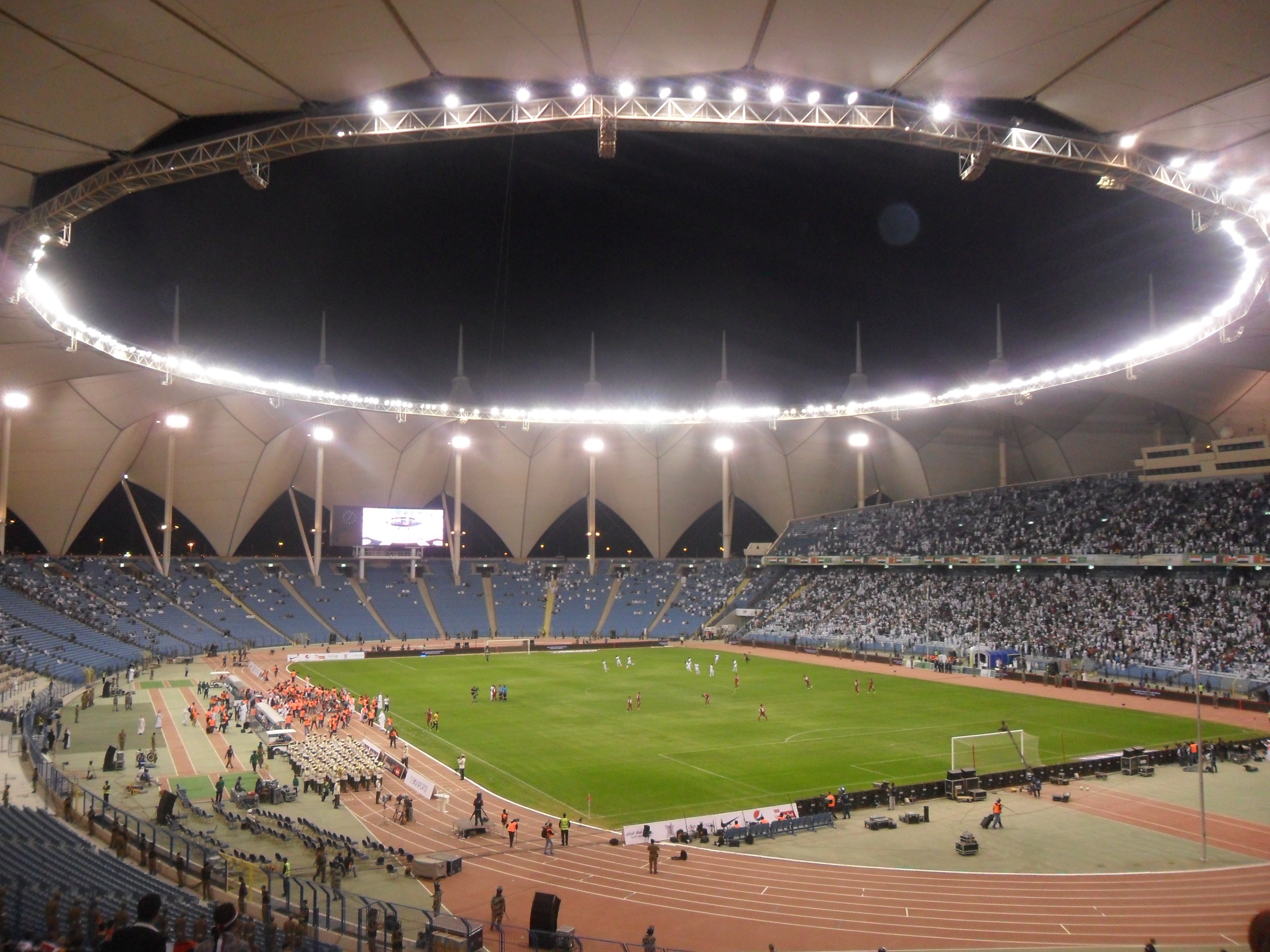
- The King Fahd International Stadium in Riyadh will host the match
- Event: Saudi Super Cup
Al Hilal	Al Faisaly
Pro League	King Cup
2	2
- Al-Hilal won 4–3 on penalties
- Date: 6 January 2022
- Venue: Prince Faisal bin Fahd Stadium, Riyadh
- Man of the Match: Abdullah Al-Mayouf
- Referee: Danny Makkelie (Netherlands)
- Attendance: 6,164
- Weather: Clear; 12 °C (54 °F); 57% humidity

The 2021 Saudi Super Cup (also known as The Berain Saudi Super Cup for sponsorship reasons) was the 8th edition of the Saudi Super Cup, an annual football match played between the winners of the previous season's Saudi Pro League and King's Cup. It was played on 6 January 2022 at the Prince Faisal bin Fahd Stadium, Riyadh, between Al Hilal and Al Faisaly.

Al-Hilal defeated Al-Faisaly 4–3 on penalties after a 2–2 draw to win their third title. Al-Hilal then became the most successful team in the Super Cup, surpassing Al-Nassr's two titles.

== Venue ==
The King Fahd International Stadium was originally announced as the venue of the final on 15 September 2021. However, on 31 December, it was announced that the match would instead take place at the Prince Faisal bin Fahd Stadium in Riyadh. This will be the first Super Cup to be held at the stadium

The Prince Faisal bin Fahd Stadium was built in 1969 and opened in 1971 with the King Cup final between Al-Shabab and Al-Ahli being the opener. The stadium was used as a venue for many domestic cup finals and the 1972 Arabian Gulf Cup. Its current capacity is 22,500 and it is used by the Saudi Arabia national football team, Al-Hilal, and Al-Shabab.

== Background ==
As part of the running sponsorship deal between the Saudi Arabian Football Federation (SAFF) and Saudi water company Berain, the match will be officially referred to as "The Berain Saudi Super Cup".

This was Al-Hilal's fifth appearance in the competition and second consecutive one. Al-Hilal won the title twice, in 2015 and 2018, and finished as runners-up twice, in 2016 and 2020. This was Al-Faisaly's first appearance in the competition.

Al-Hilal qualified by winning the 2020–21 Saudi Professional League on 23 May 2021. Al-Faisaly qualified after winning their first ever King Cup title on 27 May 2021.

This was the first meeting between these two sides in the Saudi Super Cup and the first-ever meeting between them in a cup final. This was the 34th competitive meeting between the two with the first meeting dating back to 20 March 1975. Al-Hilal won 26 times while the two teams drew seven times. Al-Faisaly have never beaten Al-Hilal in a competitive match before. The two teams met once in the 2021–22 season with Al-Hilal coming back from 2–0 down to win the match 3–2.

== Match ==
=== Details ===
6 January 2022
20:15 AST

Al Hilal	2–2	Al Faisaly
Al-Dawsari 40'; Al-Shahrani 53'	Report	Al-Amri 16'; Amalfitano 24'
Penalties
Marega (penalty scored); Al-Hamdan (penalty scored); Al-Dawsari (penalty scored); Pereira (penalty missed); Gomis (penalty missed); Al-Faraj (penalty scored)	4–3	Guilherme (penalty scored); Ismael (penalty scored); Al-Saiari (penalty missed); Silva (penalty missed); Rossi (penalty scored); Al-Ahmed (penalty missed)

Prince Faisal bin Fahd Stadium, Riyadh
Attendance: 6,164
Referee: Danny Makkelie (Netherlands)

Al-Hilal	Al-Faisaly

GK	1	(Saudi Arabia) Abdullah Al-Mayouf	(yellow card) 27'
RB	2	(Saudi Arabia) Mohammed Al-Breik		(substituted off) 58'
CB	20	(South Korea) Jang Hyun-soo	(yellow card) 31'
CB	5	(Saudi Arabia) Ali Al-Bulaihi	(yellow card) 79'
LB	12	(Saudi Arabia) Yasser Al-Shahrani		(substituted off) 90+1'
DM	28	(Saudi Arabia) Mohamed Kanno		(substituted off) 75'
DM	7	(Saudi Arabia) Salman Al-Faraj (c)
RW	17	(Mali) Moussa Marega
AM	15	(Brazil) Matheus Pereira
LW	29	(Saudi Arabia) Salem Al-Dawsari
CF	18	(France) Bafétimbi Gomis
Substitutes:
GK	33	(Saudi Arabia) Abdullah Al-Jadaani
DF	23	(Saudi Arabia) Madallah Al-Olayan
DF	32	(Saudi Arabia) Muteb Al-Mufarrij
DF	70	(Saudi Arabia) Mohammed Jahfali
DF	88	(Saudi Arabia) Hamad Al-Yami		(substituted on) 58'
MF	19	(Peru) André Carrillo		(substituted on) 75'
MF	43	(Saudi Arabia) Musab Al-Juwayr
FW	10	(Argentina) Luciano Vietto
FW	14	(Saudi Arabia) Abdullah Al-Hamdan		(substituted on) 90+1'
Manager:
(Portugal) Leonardo Jardim

GK	26	(Saudi Arabia) Mustafa Malayekah
RB	22	(Saudi Arabia) Yassin Barnawi	(yellow card) 70'
CB	4	(Brazil) Raphael Silva
CB	3	(Brazil) Igor Rossi (c)
LB	5	(Saudi Arabia) Mohammed Al-Amri	(yellow card) 42'	(substituted off) 90+6'
DM	7	(Brazil) Ismael
DM	6	(Netherlands) Hicham Faik		(substituted off) 71'
RW	77	(Saudi Arabia) Khalid Kaabi		(substituted off) 46'
AM	23	(France) Romain Amalfitano		(substituted off) 90'
LW	11	(Brazil) Guilherme
CF	19	(Cape Verde) Júlio Tavares	(red card) 45+3'
Substitutes:
GK	28	(Saudi Arabia) Ahmed Al-Kassar
DF	12	(Saudi Arabia) Hussain Qassem
DF	17	(Saudi Arabia) Saleh Al-Qumayzi
DF	55	(Saudi Arabia) Mohammed Al-Nukhylan
DF	99	(Saudi Arabia) Waleed Al-Ahmed		(substituted on) 46'
MF	39	(Saudi Arabia) Abdulrahman Al-Dawsari		(substituted on) 71'
MF	70	(Saudi Arabia) Ahmed Al-Anzi		(substituted on) 90'
FW	14	(Saudi Arabia) Saleh Al Abbas
FW	80	(Saudi Arabia) Mohammed Al-Saiari		(substituted on) 90+6'
Manager:
(Portugal) Daniel Ramos

Man of the Match:
Abdullah Al-Mayouf (Al-Hilal)

Assistant referees:
Hessel Steegstra (Netherlands)
Jan de Vries (Netherlands)
Fourth official:
Sultan Al-Harbi
Video assistant referee:
Kevin Blom (Netherlands)
Assistant video assistant referees:
Yasser Al-Sultan

Match rules

- 90 minutes
- Penalty shoot-out if scores still level
- Nine named substitutes
- Maximum of five substitutions

=== Statistics ===
First half
Statistic	Al-Hilal	Al-Faisaly
Goals scored	1	2
Total shots	5	8
Shots on target	3	4
Saves	2	1
Ball possession	70%	30%
Corner kicks	8	4
Offsides	3	0
Yellow cards	2	1
Red cards	0	1

Second half
Statistic	Al-Hilal	Al-Faisaly
Goals scored	1	0
Total shots	9	0
Shots on target	4	0
Saves	0	3
Ball possession	81%	19%
Corner kicks	9	0
Offsides	1	1
Yellow cards	1	1
Red cards	0	0

Overall
Statistic	Al-Hilal	Al-Faisaly
Goals scored	2	2
Total shots	14	8
Shots on target	7	4
Saves	2	4
Ball possession	76%	24%
Corner kicks	17	4
Fouls committed	18	13
Offsides	4	1
Yellow cards	3	2
Red cards	0	1

== See also ==
- 2020–21 Saudi Professional League
- 2020–21 King Cup
- 2021 King Cup Final
