= 2021 King Cup final =

- Event: 2020–21 King Cup
Al-Taawoun	Al-Faisaly
2	3
- Date: 27 May 2021
- Venue: King Fahd International Stadium, Riyadh
- Referee: Szymon Marciniak (Poland)
- Attendance: (Note: Attendance was capped at 40% due to the COVID-19 pandemic in Saudi Arabia.)
- Weather: Clear; 36 °C (97 °F); 7% humidity

The 2021 King Cup final was the 46th final of the King Cup, Saudi Arabia's main football knock-out competition since its inception in 1957.

The final was played at the King Fahd International Stadium, Riyadh, on 27 May 2021. The match was contested by Al-Taawoun and Al-Faisaly. It will be Al-Taawoun's 3rd King Cup final and Al-Faisaly's 2nd. This will be the first meeting between these two sides in the King Cup. The attendance was capped at 40% after due to the COVID-19 pandemic in Saudi Arabia.

Al-Faisaly defeated Al-Taawoun 3–2 to win their first King Cup title.

== Teams ==
Team	Previous finals appearances (bold indicates winners)
Al-Taawoun	2 (1990, **2019**)
Al-Faisaly	1 (2018)

== Venue ==
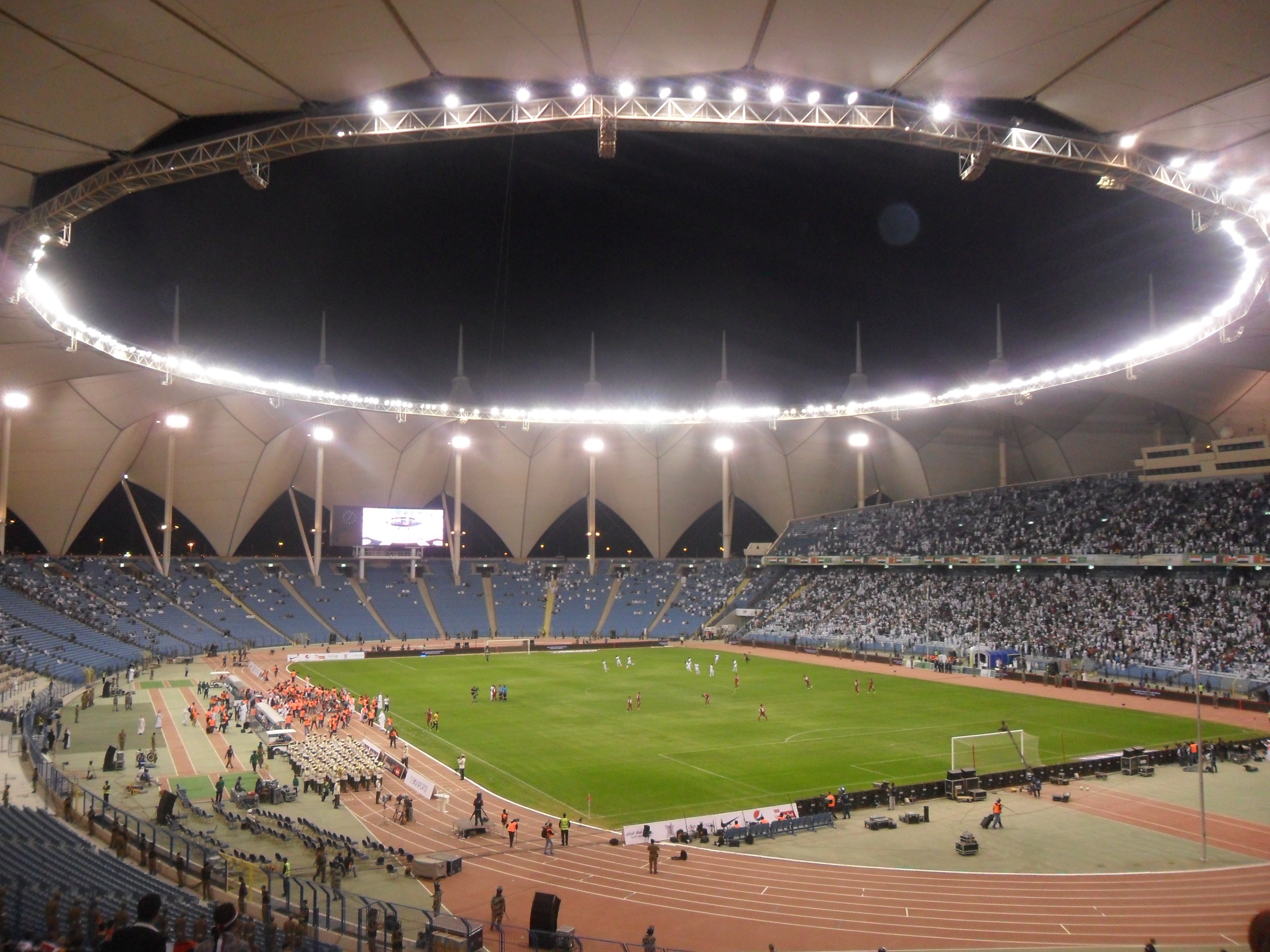
The King Fahd International Stadium in Riyadh hosted the final

The King Fahd International Stadium was announced as the final venue on 25 May 2021. This was the eighth King Cup final hosted in the King Fahd International Stadium following those in 1988, 2008, 2009, 2010, 2013, 2019 and 2020.

The King Fahd International Stadium was built in 1982 and was opened in 1987. The stadium was used as a venue for the 1992, 1995, and the 1997 editions of the FIFA Confederations Cup. Its current capacity is 68,752 and it is used by the Saudi Arabia national football team, Al-Hilal, Al-Shabab, and major domestic matches.

== Background ==
Al-Taawoun reached their third final after a 3–2 win against Al-Fateh. This was Al-Taawoun's second final in three years. Al-Taawoun won their first title in 2019 after defeating Al-Ittihad and finished as runners-up in 1990.

Al-Faisaly reached their second final, after a 1–0 away win against Al-Nassr. This was Al-Faisaly's first final since 2018, which they lost against Al-Ittihad.

The two teams met twice earlier in the season with both matches ending in draws. This was the first meeting between these two sides in the King Cup and the 46th meeting between them in all competitions. In the clubs' 45 previous meetings, Al-Taawoun won 21, Al-Faisaly won 13 and the remaining 11 were drawn.

== Road to the final ==
Note: In all results below, the score of the finalist is given first (H: home; A: away).

Al-Taawoun		Round	Al-Faisaly
Opponent	Result	2020–21 King Cup	Opponent	Result
Damac (A)	2–1	Round of 16	Al-Ettifaq (A)	0–0 (9–8 p)
Al-Qadsiah (H)	2–1	Quarter-finals	Al-Batin (A)	2–1
Al-Fateh (H)	3–2	Semi-finals	Al-Nassr (A)	1–0

== Match ==
=== Details ===
27 May 2021
21:00 AST

Al-Taawoun	2–3	Al-Faisaly
Tawamba 14'; Kaku 45' (pen.)	Report	Tavares 40' (pen.), 60', 90+3'

King Fahd International Stadium, Riyadh
Attendance:
Referee: Szymon Marciniak (Poland)

**Al-Taawoun**	**Al-Faisaly**

GK	1	(Brazil) Cássio
RB	2	(Saudi Arabia) Yassin Barnawi
CB	33	(Saudi Arabia) Ahmed Assiri (c)	(yellow card) 39'	(substituted off) 46'
CB	4	(Brazil) Iago Santos
LB	14	(Saudi Arabia) Hassan Kadesh		(substituted off) 74'
CM	17	(Burundi) Cédric Amissi	(yellow card) 65'	(substituted off) 90+5'
CM	55	(Brazil) Sandro Manoel		(substituted off) 74'
RW	29	(Saudi Arabia) Abdullah Al-Jouei
AM	10	(Paraguay) Kaku
LW	8	(Saudi Arabia) Sumayhan Al-Nabit	(yellow card) 51'
CF	3	(Cameroon) Léandre Tawamba
Substitutes:
GK	23	(Saudi Arabia) Hussain Shae'an
DF	6	(Saudi Arabia) Mohammed Al-Ghamdi		(substituted in) 74'
DF	25	(Saudi Arabia) Faisal Darwish
DF	85	(Saudi Arabia) Nawaf Al-Sobhi		(substituted in) 46'
MF	5	(Saudi Arabia) Ryan Al-Mousa
MF	11	(Saudi Arabia) Ali Al-Nemer
MF	66	(Saudi Arabia) Mohammed Abousaban		(substituted in) 74'
FW	24	(Saudi Arabia) Mohammad Al-Sahlawi		(substituted in) 90+5'
FW	27	(Senegal) Abdoulaye Sané
Manager:
(England) Nestor El Maestro

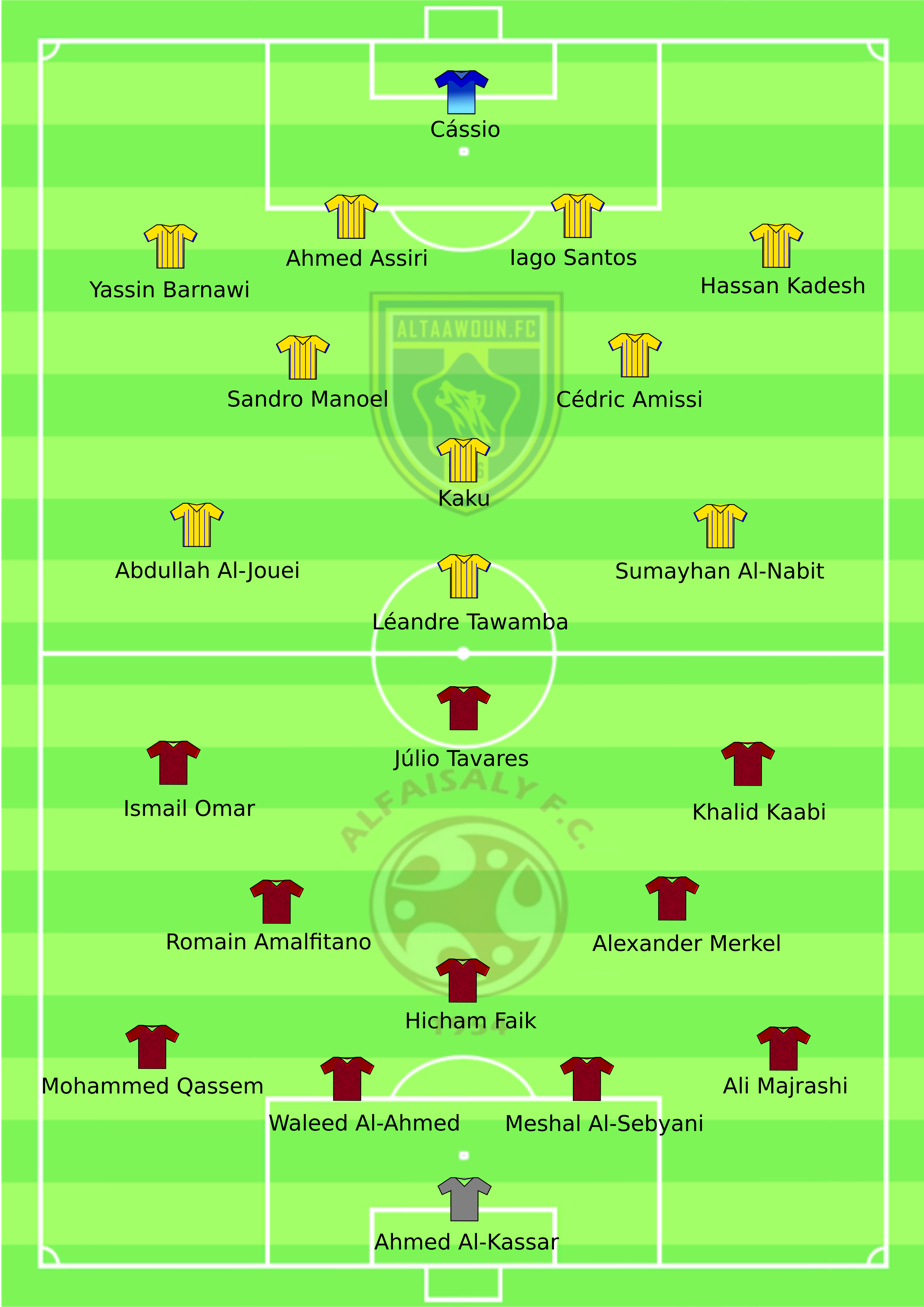

GK	28	(Saudi Arabia) Ahmed Al-Kassar (c)
RB	14	(Saudi Arabia) Ali Majrashi	(yellow card) 86'
CB	87	(Saudi Arabia) Meshal Al-Sebyani		(substituted off) 82'
CB	24	(Saudi Arabia) Waleed Al-Ahmed
LB	18	(Saudi Arabia) Mohammed Qassem
CM	6	(Netherlands) Hicham Faik
CM	52	(Kazakhstan) Alexander Merkel
RW	77	(Saudi Arabia) Khalid Kaabi		(substituted off) 90+5'
AM	23	(France) Romain Amalfitano		(substituted off) 90+5'
LW	25	(Saudi Arabia) Ismail Omar	(yellow card) 71'	(substituted off) 87'
CF	19	(Cape Verde) Júlio Tavares
Substitutes:
GK	26	(Saudi Arabia) Mustafa Malayekah
DF	2	(Saudi Arabia) Abdullah Al-Hassan
DF	17	(Saudi Arabia) Mohammed Al-Nukhylan	(red card) 83'	(substituted in) 82'
DF	51	(Saudi Arabia) Hussain Qassem		(substituted in) 87'
MF	8	(Saudi Arabia) Khaled Al-Samiri
MF	12	(Saudi Arabia) Shaye Sharahili		(substituted in) 90+5'
MF	47	(Saudi Arabia) Mustafa Bassas
MF	88	(Saudi Arabia) Abdulaziz Al-Sharid		(substituted in) 90+5'
FW	80	(Saudi Arabia) Mohammed Al-Saiari
Manager:
(Brazil) Péricles Chamusca

Assistant referees:
Tomasz Listkiewicz (Poland)
Pawel Sokolnicki (Poland)
Fourth official:
Majed Al-Shamrani
Video assistant referee:
Tomasz Musiał (Poland)
Assistant video assistant referees:
Faisal Al-Qahtani

**Match rules**

- 90 minutes
- 30 minutes of extra time if necessary
- Penalty shoot-out if scores still level
- Nine named substitutes
- Maximum of five substitutions, with a sixth allowed in extra time

=== Statistics ===
First half
Statistic	Al-Taawoun	Al-Faisaly
Goals scored	2	1
Total shots	5	7
Shots on target	2	2
Saves	1	0
Ball possession	47%	53%
Corner kicks	2	1
Fouls committed	9	4
Offsides	2	1
Yellow cards	0	0
Red cards	0	0

Second half
Statistic	Al-Taawoun	Al-Faisaly
Goals scored	0	2
Total shots	2	5
Shots on target	0	2
Saves	0	0
Ball possession	47%	53%
Corner kicks	0	0
Fouls committed	13	6
Offsides	1	1
Yellow cards	3	2
Red cards	0	1

Overall
Statistic	Al-Taawoun	Al-Faisaly
Goals scored	2	3
Total shots	7	12
Shots on target	2	4
Saves	1	0
Ball possession	47%	53%
Corner kicks	2	1
Fouls committed	22	10
Offsides	3	2
Yellow cards	3	2
Red cards	0	1

== See also ==
- 2020–21 King Cup
- 2020–21 Saudi Professional League
- 2021 Saudi Super Cup
