= Amalfitano =

Amalfitano is a surname. Notable people with the surname include:

- Joey Amalfitano (born 1934), American baseball player, manager, and coach
- Morgan Amalfitano (born 1985), French footballer
- Romain Amalfitano (born 1989), French footballer, brother of Morgan
