= Ali Majrashi =

Saudi Arabian footballer (born 1999)

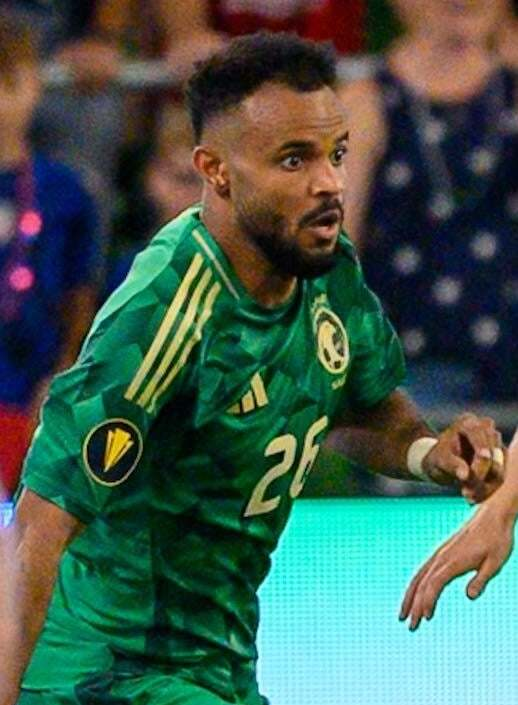
- Majrashi with Saudi Arabia in 2025

Personal information
- Full name: Ali Hassan Majrashi
- Date of birth: 2 October 1999 (age 27)
- Place of birth: Saudi Arabia
- Height: 1.69 m (5 ft 7 in)
- Position: Right back

Team information
- Current team: Al-Ahli
- Number: 27

Youth career
- –2018: Al-Shabab

Senior career*
Years	Team	Apps	(Gls)
2018–2022	Al-Shabab	25	(1)
2021	→ Al-Faisaly (loan)	11	(0)
2022–	Al-Ahli	107	(2)

International career^{‡}
2017–2019	Saudi Arabia U20		
2021–2022	Saudi Arabia U23		
2021–	Saudi Arabia	21	(0)
- * Club domestic league appearances and goals as of 20 May 2026 ‡ National team caps and goals as of 6 June 2026

Ali Hassan Majrashi (Arabic: علي حسن مجرشي; born 2 October 1999) is a Saudi Arabian footballer who plays as a right back for Saudi Pro League side Al-Ahli and the Saudi Arabia national team.

== Club Career ==
Majrashi started his career at Al-Shabab and is a product of Al-Shabab's youth system. On 30 January 2018, Majrashi made his professional debut for Al-Shabab against Al-Ahli in the Pro League, replacing Abdulwahab Jaafer. On 11 July 2019, Majrashi signed a five-year professional contract with Al-Shabab. On 30 June 2019, he was chosen in the Saudi scholarship program to develop football talents established by the General Sports Authority. On 7 February 2021, Majrashi joined Al-Faisaly on loan. He started the 2021 King Cup Final on 27 May 2021 helping Al-Faisaly win their first title. On 25 January 2022, Majrashi joined Al-Ahli on a four-year deal.

== International Career ==
On 31 May 2026, he was named in the 26-man squad for the 2026 FIFA World Cup.

== Career statistics ==
=== Club ===
As of 27 May 2024

Club	Season	League		King Cup		Asia		Other		Total	
Club	Season	Apps	Goals	Apps	Goals	Apps	Goals	Apps	Goals	Apps	Goals
Al-Shabab	2017–18	6	1	2	0	—		0	0	8	1
Al-Shabab	2018–19	1	0	1	0	—		—		2	0
Al-Shabab	2019–20	0	0	0	0	—		0	0	0	0
Al-Shabab	2020–21	5	0	1	0	—		0	0	6	0
Al-Shabab	2021–22	13	0	1	0	0	0	—		14	0
Al-Shabab	Total	25	1	5	0	0	0	0	0	30	1
Al-Faisaly (loan)	2020–21	11	0	3	0	—		—		14	0
Al-Ahli	2021–22	11	0	1	0	—		—		12	0
Al-Ahli	2022–23	21	0	—		—		—		21	0
Al-Ahli	2023–24	21	1	1	0	—		—		22	1
Al-Ahli	2024–25	9	0	1	0	4	0	1	0	15	0
Al-Ahli	Total	53	1	2	0	0	0	0	0	70	1
Career totals		89	2	10	0	0	0	0	0	114	2

== Honours ==
=== Club ===
Al-Faisaly

- King Cup: 2020–21

Al-Ahli

- Saudi First Division League: 2022–23
- Saudi Super Cup: 2025
- AFC Champions League Elite: 2024–25

AFC Champions League Elite 2025-2026
