= Ahmed Ashraf =

Saudi Arabian football (born 1992)

Ahmed Ashraf أحمد أشرف
Personal information
- Full name: Ahmed Ashraf Mohammed Al-Fiqi
- Date of birth: 31 December 1992 (age 33)
- Place of birth: Saudi Arabia
- Height: 1.76 m (5 ft 9 in)
- Position: Winger

Team information
- Current team: Al-Jabalain
- Number: 15

Youth career
- Al-Shalhoub Academy

Senior career*
Years	Team	Apps	(Gls)
2018–2020	Al-Hilal	17	(0)
2019–2020	→ Al-Faisaly (loan)	19	(2)
2020–2023	Al-Faisaly	20	(1)
2023–2024	Al-Taawoun	7	(1)
2024–	Al-Jabalain	0	(0)

International career
2017–	Saudi Arabia	1	(0)
- * Club domestic league appearances and goals

Ahmed Ashraf Al-Fiqi (Arabic: أحمد أشرف الفقي; born 31 December 1992) is a Saudi Arabian professional footballer who plays as a winger for Al-Jabalain.

== Club career ==
Ahmed Ashraf started playing as an amateur in the Al-Shalhoub Academy in Riyadh. He represented the Saudi Arabia national football team in the 23rd Arabian Gulf Cup after foreign players who were born in Saudi Arabia were allowed to represent the national team. On 10 January 2018, Ashraf signed his first professional contract, an 18 months contract, with Pro League champions Al-Hilal. On 27 December 2018, he renewed his contract with Al-Hilal for 2-years. On 22 August 2019, Ashraf joined Al-Faisaly on a one-year loan from Al-Hilal. On 25 October 2020, Ashraf joined Al-Faisaly on a permanent deal.

On 2 September 2023, Ashraf joined Al-Taawoun on a two-year deal. On 13 September 2024, Ashraf joined Al-Jabalain.

== Career statistics ==
=== Club ===
As of match played 27 May 2024

Club	Season	League		King Cup		Asia		Other		Total	
Club	Season	Apps	Goals	Apps	Goals	Apps	Goals	Apps	Goals	Apps	Goals
Al-Hilal	2017–18	7	0	0	0	0	0	—		7	0
Al-Hilal	2018–19	8	0	3	0	0	0	4 (Note: Appearances in Arab Club Champions Cup)	0	15	0
Al-Hilal	2020–21	2	0	0	0	0	0	0	0	2	0
Al-Hilal	Total	17	0	3	0	0	0	4	0	24	0
Al-Faisaly (loan)	2019–20	19	2	3	0	—		—		22	2
Al-Faisaly	2020–21	20	1	1	0	—		—		21	1
Al-Faisaly	2021–22	0	0	0	0	—		—		0	0
Al-Faisaly	Total	39	3	4	0	0	0	0	0	43	3
Al-Taawoun	2023–24	7	0	0	0	—		—		7	0
Career totals		63	3	7	0	0	0	4	0	74	3

== Honours ==
=== Club ===
Al-Hilal

- Saudi Professional League: 2017–18
- Saudi Super Cup: 2018

Al-Faisaly

- King Cup: 2020–21
