= Waleed Al-Ahmed =

Saudi Arabian footballer (born 1999)

Personal information
- Full name: Waleed Abdulwahab Al-Ahmed
- Date of birth: 3 May 1999 (age 27)
- Place of birth: Riyadh, Saudi Arabia
- Height: 1.89 m (6 ft 2 in)
- Position: Defender

Team information
- Current team: Al-Qadsiah
- Number: 23

Youth career
- Al-Hilal

Senior career*
Years	Team	Apps	(Gls)
2019–2020	Al-Hilal	0	(0)
2020–2023	Al-Faisaly	65	(2)
2023– 2026	Al-Taawoun	63	(8)
2026–	Al-Qadsiah	6	(1)

International career^{‡}
2018–2020	Saudi Arabia U20		
2021–2022	Saudi Arabia U23		
2021–	Saudi Arabia	8	(0)
- * Club domestic league appearances and goals as of 30 October 2026 ‡ National team caps and goals as of 15 December 2025

Waleed Abdulwahab Al-Ahmed (Arabic: وَلِيد عَبْد الْوَهَّاب الْأَحْمَد; born 3 May 1999) is a Saudi Arabian professional footballer who plays as a defender for the Saudi Arabia national team and Al-Qadsiah.

== Career ==
On 6 June 2014, Al-Ahmed signed for Al-Hilal despite undergoing a trial at Al-Nassr. On 30 July 2017, he made his debut for Al-Hilal in the Arab Club Championship group stage match against ES Tunis. On 30 June 2019, he was chosen in the Saudi scholarship program to develop football talents established by General Sports Authority. On 10 October 2020, he joined Al-Faisaly on a three-year contract. On 27 May 2021, Al-Ahmed started the 2021 King Cup Final against Al-Taawoun and helped Al-Faisaly win their first title.

On 21 June 2023, he joined Al-Taawoun on a free transfer.

On 02 January 2026, he joined Al-Qadsiah .

== Career statistics ==
=== Club ===
As of 30 May 2024.

Club	Season	League		Cup		Continental		Other		Total	
Club	Season	Apps	Goals	Apps	Goals	Apps	Goals	Apps	Goals	Apps	Goals
Al-Hilal	2017–18	0	0	0	0	0	0	1 (Note: Appearances in Arab Club Championship)	0	1	0
Al-Hilal	2018–19	0	0	0	0	0	0	0	0	0	0
Al-Hilal	2019–20	0	0	0	0	0	0	0	0	0	0
Al-Hilal	Total	0	0	0	0	0	0	1	0	1	0
Al-Faisaly	2020–21	15	0	3	0	–		–		18	0
Al-Faisaly	2021–22	21	1	0	0	6	0	1 (Note: Appearances in Saudi Super Cup)	0	28	1
Al-Faisaly	2022–23	29	1	–		1	0	–		30	1
Al-Faisaly	Total	65	2	3	0	7	0	1	0	76	2
Al-Taawoun	2023–24	23	2	2	0	–		–		25	2
Career total		88	4	5	0	7	0	2	0	102	4

== Honours ==
Al-Faisaly

- King Cup: 2020–21

=== International ===
Saudi Arabia U23

- AFC U-23 Asian Cup: 2022
