= Ahmed Al-Anzi =

Saudi Arabian footballer

Ahmed Al-Anzi أحمد العنزي
Personal information
- Full name: Ahmed Atallah Al-Anzi
- Date of birth: 22 January 1999 (age 27)
- Place of birth: Saudi Arabia
- Height: 1.73 m (5 ft 8 in)
- Position: Midfielder

Team information
- Current team: Al-Zulfi
- Number: 70

Youth career
- –2017: Al-Almin
- 2017–2019: Al-Faisaly

Senior career*
Years	Team	Apps	(Gls)
2019–2024	Al-Faisaly	31	(0)
2022	→ Al-Adalah (loan)	12	(0)
2023	→ Najran (loan)	11	(0)
2024–2025	Al-Safa	26	(2)
2025–	Al-Zulfi	0	(0)
- * Club domestic league appearances and goals

Ahmed Al-Anzi (Arabic: أحمد العنزي, born 22 January 1999) is a Saudi Arabian professional footballer who plays as a midfielder for Al-Zulfi.

== Career ==
Al-Anzi joined Al-Faisaly's youth team from Al-Almin on 26 August 2017. On 26 October 2019, Al-Anzi made his professional debut for Al-Faisaly against Al-Taawoun in the Saudi Pro League, replacing Khaleem Hyland. On 30 January 2022, Al-Anzi joined Al-Adalah on loan. On 28 January 2023, Al-Anzi joined Najran on loan. On 5 August 2025, Al-Anzi joined Al-Zulfi.

== Career statistics ==
=== Club ===
As of match played 13 July 2020

Club	Season	League		King Cup		Asia		Other		Total	
Club	Season	Apps	Goals	Apps	Goals	Apps	Goals	Apps	Goals	Apps	Goals
Al-Faisaly	2018–19	0	0	0	0	—		—		0	0
Al-Faisaly	2019–20	5	0	2	0	—		—		7	0
Al-Faisaly	2020–21	5	0	0	0	—		—		5	0
Al-Faisaly	2021–22	3	0	0	0	—		1 (Note: Appearance in Saudi Super Cup)	0	4	0
Al-Faisaly	Total	13	0	2	0	0	0	1	0	16	0
Career totals		13	0	2	0	0	0	1	0	16	0

== Honours ==
=== Club ===
Al-Faisaly

- King Cup: 2020–21

Al-Adalah

- First Division runner-up: 2021–22
