= Igor Rossi =

Brazilian footballer (born 1989)

Personal information
- Full name: Igor Rossi Branco
- Date of birth: 10 March 1989 (age 37)
- Place of birth: Campinas, Brazil
- Height: 1.87 m (6 ft 2 in)
- Position: Centre-back

Team information
- Current team: Qadsia
- Number: 2

Youth career
- Internacional

Senior career*
Years	Team	Apps	(Gls)
2008–2010	Internacional	3	(0)
2011–2015	Marítimo B	47	(5)
2011–2015	Marítimo	25	(2)
2015–2017	Heart of Midlothian	49	(2)
2017–2022	Al-Faisaly	143	(13)
2022–2023	Al-Ittihad Kalba	18	(1)
2023–2024	Farense	13	(0)
2024–	Qadsia	0	(0)
- * Club domestic league appearances and goals as of 1 June 2024

Igor Rossi Branco, simply known as Igor Rossi (born 10 March 1989) is a Brazilian professional footballer who plays as a centre-back for Qadsia.

== Football career ==
Igor Rossi began his career in Internacional. In 2010, he moved to Marítimo, and started to play in the Marítimo's B team. At the end of the 2010–11 season, Rossi was promoted to the first team.

After being included as an unused substitute in the opening game of the season against Beira-Mar, Rossi made his debut for the senior team in the Primeira Liga on 11 December 2011, in a 1–0 against Benfica. Rossi later made five appearances in the 2011–12 season.

In the 2012–13 season, Igor was included in the 25 man squad. Igor then scored his first goal in a game against Benfica. In his final season before being released, he played only four matches - two as a starter - and ten for the reserves in Segunda Liga.

On 22 July 2015, he signed a one-year deal at Heart of Midlothian, newly returned to the Scottish Premiership. He made his debut eight days later in the first round of the season's Scottish League Cup at home against Arbroath, replacing double goalscorer Osman Sow for the final 13 minutes of a 4–2 victory. On 2 August he played the full 90 minutes of his first league game, a 4–3 win against St Johnstone.

Rossi moved to Saudi club Al-Faisaly Harmah in January 2017.

On 20 July 2022, Rossi joined Emirati side Al-Ittihad Kalba on a free transfer.

On 22 August 2023, Rossi returned to Portugal, joining recently-promoted to Primeira Liga side Farense on a one-year contract.

== Personal life ==
His younger brother, Raphael, is also a defender, who plays for Polish club Radomiak Radom.

== Career statistics ==
As of 15 May 2023

Club statistics
Club	Season	League		League Cup		National Cup		Continental		Other		Total	
Club	Season	App	Goals	App	Goals	App	Goals	App	Goals	App	Goals	App	Goals
Marítimo	2011–12	5	0	2	0	0	0	0	0	0	0	7	0
Marítimo	2012–13	6	1	0	0	0	0	4	0	0	0	10	1
Marítimo	2013–14	12	1	2	0	0	0	0	0	0	0	14	1
Marítimo	2014–15	2	0	0	0	0	0	0	0	0	0	2	0
Marítimo	Total	25	2	4	0	0	0	4	0	0	0	33	2
Heart of Midlothian	2015–16	29	2	4	0	2	0	0	0	0	0	35	2
Heart of Midlothian	2016–17	20	0	1	0	0	0	3	2	0	0	24	2
Heart of Midlothian	Total	49	2	5	0	2	0	3	2	0	0	59	4
Al-Faisaly	2016–17	11	0	0	0	4	0	0	0	0	0	15	0
Al-Faisaly	2017–18	24	3	0	0	5	0	0	0	2	0	31	3
Al-Faisaly	2018–19	27	4	–	–	2	0	0	0	0	0	29	4
Al-Faisaly	2019–20	30	4	–	–	3	0	0	0	0	0	33	4
Al-Faisaly	2020–21	25	1	–	–	3	0	0	0	0	0	28	1
Al-Faisaly	2021–22	26	1	–	–	1	0	1	0	1	0	29	1
Al-Faisaly	Total	143	13	0	0	18	0	1	0	3	0	165	13
Ittihad Kalba FC	2022–23	18	1	1	0	0	0	0	0	0	0	19	1
Ittihad Kalba FC	Total	18	1	1	0	0	0	0	0	0	0	19	1
Career total		218	245	11	0	20	0	8	2	3	0	276	18

== Honours ==
=== Club ===
Al-Faisaly

- King Cup: 2020–21
