= Hamed Fallatah =

Saudi Arabian footballer

Personal information
- Full name: Hamed Hashim Fallatah
- Date of birth: December 3, 1992 (age 33)
- Place of birth: Saudi Arabia
- Height: 1.79 m (5 ft 10 1/2 in)
- Position: Midfielder

Team information
- Current team: Al-Safa
- Number: 42

Youth career
- 2003–2013: Al-Ettifaq
- 2013–2014: Al-Nahda

Senior career*
Years	Team	Apps	(Gls)
2014–2020	Al-Nahda	-	(-)
2020–2023	Al-Faisaly	2	(0)
2021	→ Al-Nahda (loan)	21	(0)
2021–2022	→ Al-Tai (loan)	23	(0)
2022–2023	→ Al-Jabalain (loan)	24	(1)
2023–	Al-Safa		
- * Club domestic league appearances and goals

Hamed Fallatah (Arabic:حامد فلاته; born 3 December 1992) is a football player who plays as a midfielder for Al-Safa.

== Career ==
Fallatah started his career at Al-Ettifaq and signed his first contract with the club on 9 January 2011. On 15 August 2013, Fallatah left Al-Ettifaq and joined city rivals Al-Nahda. He made his debut for Al-Nahda on 7 February 2014 in the league match against Al-Taawoun. He went on to make three more appearances as Al-Nahda suffered relegation to the First Division. On 19 August 2019, Fallatah renewed his contract with Al-Nahda for another year. On 3 July 2020, Fallatah joined Al-Faisaly on a three-year contract. On 22 January 2021, Fallatah rejoined Al-Nahda on loan until the end of the season. On 24 July 2021, Fallatah joined Al-Tai on loan until the end of the 2021–22 season. On 4 September 2022, Fallatah joined Al-Jabalain on loan. On 14 July 2023, Fallatah joined Al-Safa.
