= Khaled Daghriri =

Saudi Arabian footballer

Khaled Daghriri خالد دغريري
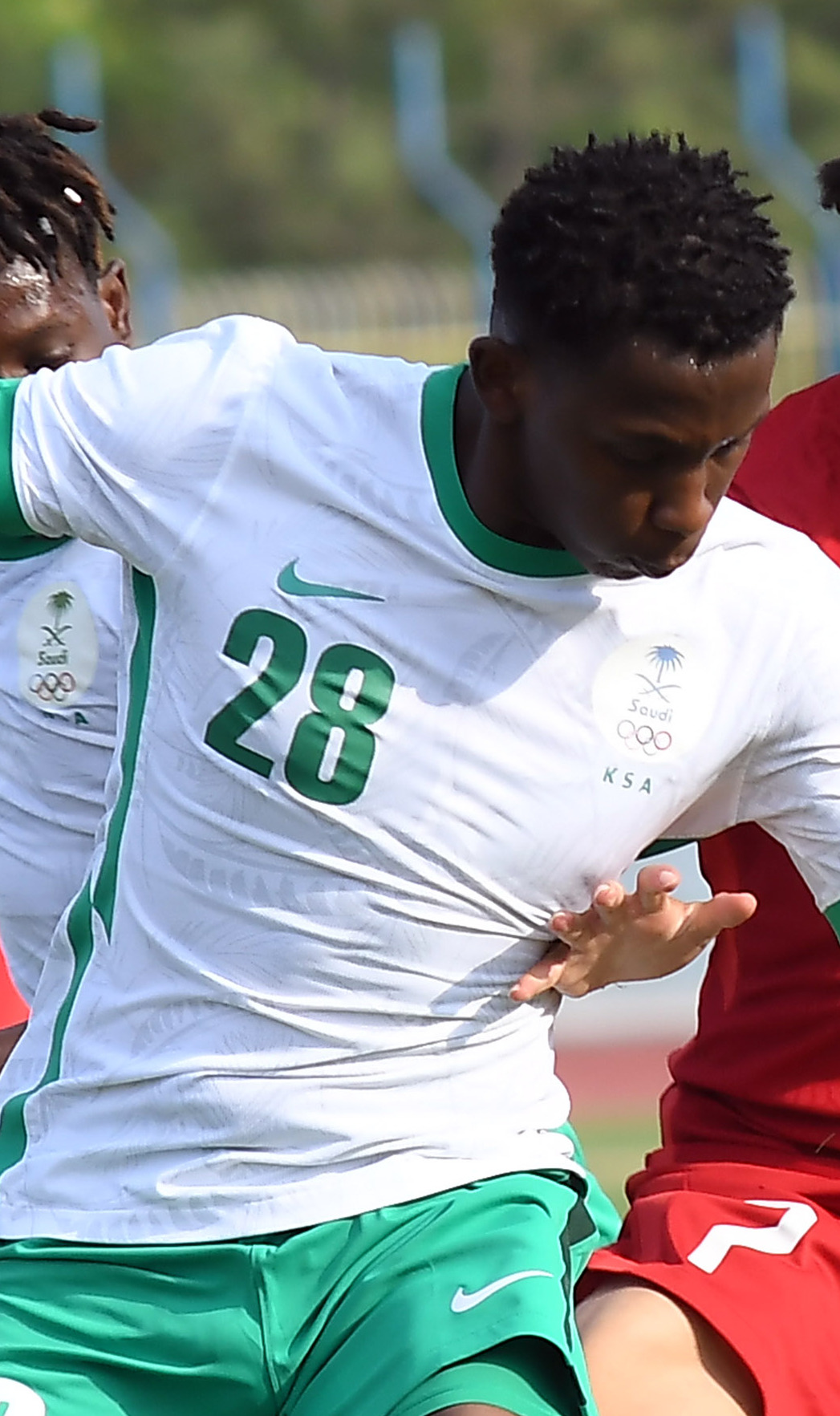
- Daghriri in 2022

Personal information
- Full name: Khaled Hussein Daghriri
- Date of birth: 14 August 2001 (age 25)
- Place of birth: Saudi Arabia
- Position: Right back

Team information
- Current team: Al-Qous

Youth career
- –2020: Al-Faisaly

Senior career*
Years	Team	Apps	(Gls)
2020–2025	Al-Faisaly	17	(0)
2023–2024	→ Al-Jandal (loan)	24	(0)
2025–	Al-Qous		

International career
2019–2021	Saudi Arabia U20		
2022–2024	Saudi Arabia U23		
Medal record
Men's football
Representing Saudi Arabia
Islamic Solidarity Games
Silver medal – second place	2021 Konya
- * Club domestic league appearances and goals

Khaled Hussein Daghriri (Arabic: خالد دغريري; born 14 August 2001) is a Saudi Arabian professional footballer who plays as a right back for Al-Qous.

== Career ==
Daghriri started his career at the youth team of Al-Faisaly and represented the club at every level. He signed his first contract on 14 October 2020. He made his debut on 17 October 2020 in the league match against Al-Taawoun. On 28 July 2023, Daghriri joined Al-Jandal on loan. On 24 August 2025, Daghriri joined Al-Qous.

== Honours ==
=== Club ===
Al-Faisaly

- King Cup: 2020–21
