= Hussain Al Quraish =

Saudi Arabian footballer

Hussain Al Quraish حسين آل قريش
Personal information
- Full name: Hussain Anwer Al Quraish
- Date of birth: 18 December 1997 (age 28)
- Place of birth: Safwa, Saudi Arabia
- Height: 1.81 m (5 ft 11 in)
- Position: Midfielder

Team information
- Current team: Al-Hada
- Number: 5

Youth career
- –2018: Al-Safa

Senior career*
Years	Team	Apps	(Gls)
2018–2019	Al-Safa		
2019–2022	Al-Faisaly	6	(0)
2020–2021	→ Al-Nahda (loan)	10	(0)
2021–2022	→ Al-Safa (loan)		
2022–2024	Al-Safa		
2024	Mudhar		
2024–	Al-Hada		
- * Club domestic league appearances and goals

Hussain Al Quraish (Arabic: حسين آل قريش, born 18 December 1997) is a Saudi Arabian professional footballer who plays as a midfielder for Al-Hada.

== Career ==
Al Quraish began his career at the youth team of Al-Safa. On 23 August 2019, Al Quraish signed a three-year contract with Al-Faisaly. On 6 October 2020, Al Quraish signed a one-year contract with Al-Nahda on loan Al-Faisaly. On 2 August 2021, Al Quraish joined former club Al-Safa on loan. On 14 June 2022, Al Quraish joined Al-Safa on a permanent deal. On 8 January 2024, Al Quraish joined Mudhar. On 7 August 2024, Al Quraish joined Al-Hada.
