= Ismail Omar (footballer) =

Saudi Arabian footballer

Ismail Omar إسماعيل عمر
Personal information
- Full name: Ismail Omar Ahmed
- Date of birth: 21 March 1992 (age 34)
- Place of birth: Jeddah, Saudi Arabia
- Height: 1.70 m (5 ft 7 in)
- Position: Winger

Youth career
- Jeddah

Senior career*
Years	Team	Apps	(Gls)
2014–2020	Jeddah	-	(-)
2020–2023	Al-Faisaly	47	(3)
2023–2024	Al-Batin	20	(1)
2024–2025	Jeddah	28	(2)
2025–2026	Al-Ain		
- * Club domestic league appearances and goals as of 30 May 2023

Ismail Omar (Arabic: إسماعيل عمر; born 21 March 1992) is a Saudi Arabian professional footballer who plays as a winger.

== Career ==
Ismail started his career at the youth team of Jeddah and made his first team debut in 2014. On 8 September 2020, he joined Al-Faisaly on a three-year contract. On 27 May 2021, Omar started the 2021 King Cup Final against Al-Taawoun and helped Al-Faisaly win their first title. On 30 July 2023, Omar joined Al-Batin. On 2 October 2025, Omar joined Al-Ain.

== Honours ==
Al-Faisaly

- King Cup: 2020–21
