= Mohammed Al-Amri =

Saudi Arabian footballer

Personal information
- Full name: Mohammed Al-Amri
- Date of birth: November 26, 1991 (age 34)
- Place of birth: Jeddah, Saudi Arabia
- Height: 1.72 m (5 ft 8 in)
- Position: Left back

Team information
- Current team: Al-Orobah
- Number: 5

Youth career
- Al-Ittihad

Senior career*
Years	Team	Apps	(Gls)
2011–2016	Al-Ittihad	19	(2)
2015	→ Al-Raed (loan)	11	(0)
2016–2020	Al-Raed	79	(3)
2020–2021	Al-Wehda	9	(0)
2021–2024	Al-Faisaly	62	(1)
2024–2025	Neom	16	(4)
2025–	Al-Orobah	0	(0)

International career^{‡}
2019	Saudi Arabia	1	(0)
- * Club domestic league appearances and goals as of 16 May 2019 ‡ National team caps and goals as of 4 May 2024

Mohammed Al-Amri (Arabic: مُحَمَّد الْعُمَرِيّ; born 26 November 1991) is a Saudi Arabian professional footballer who plays as a left back for Al-Orobah.

== Career ==
On 24 February 2020, Al-Amri signed a pre-contract agreement with Al-Wehda. He officially joined the club on a three-year deal following the conclusion of the 2019–20 season. On 18 July 2021, Al-Amri joined Al-Faisaly on a three-year deal following Al-Wehda's relegation. On 30 January 2024, Al-Amri joined Second Division side Neom. On 20 September 2025, Al-Amri joined Al-Orobah.

== Honours ==
Al-Ittihad

- King Cup: 2013

Neom

- Saudi First Division League: 2024–25
- Saudi Second Division League: 2023–24
