= Raphael Silva =

Brazilian footballer

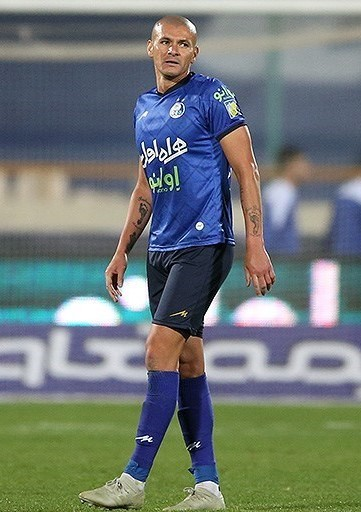
- Silva with Esteghlal in 2022

Personal information
- Full name: Raphael Silva da Arruda
- Date of birth: 20 April 1992 (age 34)
- Place of birth: Cuiabá, Brazil
- Height: 1.93 m (6 ft 4 in)
- Position: Centre-back

Team information
- Current team: Al-Faisaly
- Number: 4

Senior career*
Years	Team	Apps	(Gls)
2010–2013	Rio Preto	29	(0)
2013–2016	Ponte Preta	9	(0)
2015	→ Boa (loan)	26	(1)
2016–2018	Criciúma	54	(2)
2018	Goiás	0	(0)
2018–2019	Boavista	13	(0)
2019–2022	Al-Faisaly	67	(6)
2022–2025	Esteghlal	71	(2)
2025–	Al-Faisaly	8	(2)
- * Club domestic league appearances and goals as of 23 November 2025

Raphael Silva da Arruda (born 20 April 1992) is a Brazilian professional footballer who most recently played as a centre-back for Saudi Arabian club Al-Faisaly.

== Career ==
Born in Cuiabá, Silva started his senior career in 2010 with Rio Preto Esporte Clube, in Paulista A2. On 19 July 2013, he joined Série A club Associação Atlética Ponte Preta. On 25 July, he made his debut for the club in a 1–0 defeat against Nacional Futebol Clube in the Copa do Brasil.

After struggling to get playing time, Silva was loaned out to Boa Esporte Clube on 1 April 2015. On 23 May, he scored his first goal for the club in a 1–1 draw against Paraná Clube. On 13 January 2016, he joined Criciúma Esporte Clube on a two-year contract. On 18 July 2017, he injured himself during a match against Boa Esporte Clube, returning to play three months later in late October.

On 8 January 2018, Silva switched to Goiás Esporte Clube. However, after being rarely used, he terminated his contract with the club on 28 June. Two days later, he moved abroad and signed for Portuguese club Boavista on a three-year contract.

On 30 May 2019, Silva signed Saudi club Al-Faisaly FC on a one-year contract. On 31 January 2022, Silva was released by Al-Faisaly.

On 19 August 2025, Silva returned to Al-Faisaly on a one-year contract.

== Career statistics ==
As of 29 May 2025

Appearances and goals by club, season and competition
Club	Season	League			Cup		Continental		Other		Total	
Club	Season	Division	Apps	Goals	Apps	Goals	Apps	Goals	Apps	Goals	Apps	Goals
Esteghlal	2021–22	Persian Gulf Pro League	8	0	1	0	0	0	0	0	9	0
Esteghlal	2022–23	Persian Gulf Pro League	27	0	5	0	0	0	1	0	33	0
Esteghlal	2023–24	Persian Gulf Pro League	10	0	1	0	0	0	0	0	11	0
Esteghlal	2024–25	Persian Gulf Pro League	26	2	4	0	8	1	0	0	38	3
Esteghlal	Total		71	2	11	0	8	1	1	0	91	3
Career total			71	2	11	0	8	1	1	0	91	3

== Honours ==
Al-Faisaly

- King Cup: 2020–21

Esteghlal

- Persian Gulf Pro League: 2021–22
- Iranian Hazfi Cup : 2024–25
- Iranian Super Cup: 2022
