= Abdullah Al-Hassan =

Saudi Arabian association football player

Abdullah Al-Hassan عبد الله الحسن
Personal information
- Full name: Abdullah Ahmed Al-Hassan
- Date of birth: 6 April 1999 (age 27)
- Place of birth: Saudi Arabia
- Height: 1.72 m (5 ft 8 in)
- Position: Right-back

Team information
- Current team: Al-Zulfi
- Number: 2

Youth career
- –2019: Al-Faisaly

Senior career*
Years	Team	Apps	(Gls)
2019–2024	Al-Faisaly	35	(0)
2022	→ Al-Jabalain (loan)	5	(0)
2024–	Al-Zulfi	0	(0)
- * Club domestic league appearances and goals

Abdullah Al-Hassan (Arabic: عبد الله الحسن, born 6 April 1999) is a Saudi Arabian professional footballer who plays as a right-back for Al-Zulfi.

== Career ==
Al-Hassan began his career at the youth team of Al-Faisaly He arrived for the first team in 2019 .He played his first match against Al-Shabab and participated as a substitute for Khalid Al-Ghamdi . On 22 January 2022, Al-Hassan joined Al-Jabalain on loan. On 1 August 2024, Al-Hassan joined Al-Zulfi.

== Honours ==
=== Club ===
Al-Faisaly

- King Cup: 2020–21
