= Meshal Al-Sebyani =

Saudi Arabian association football player

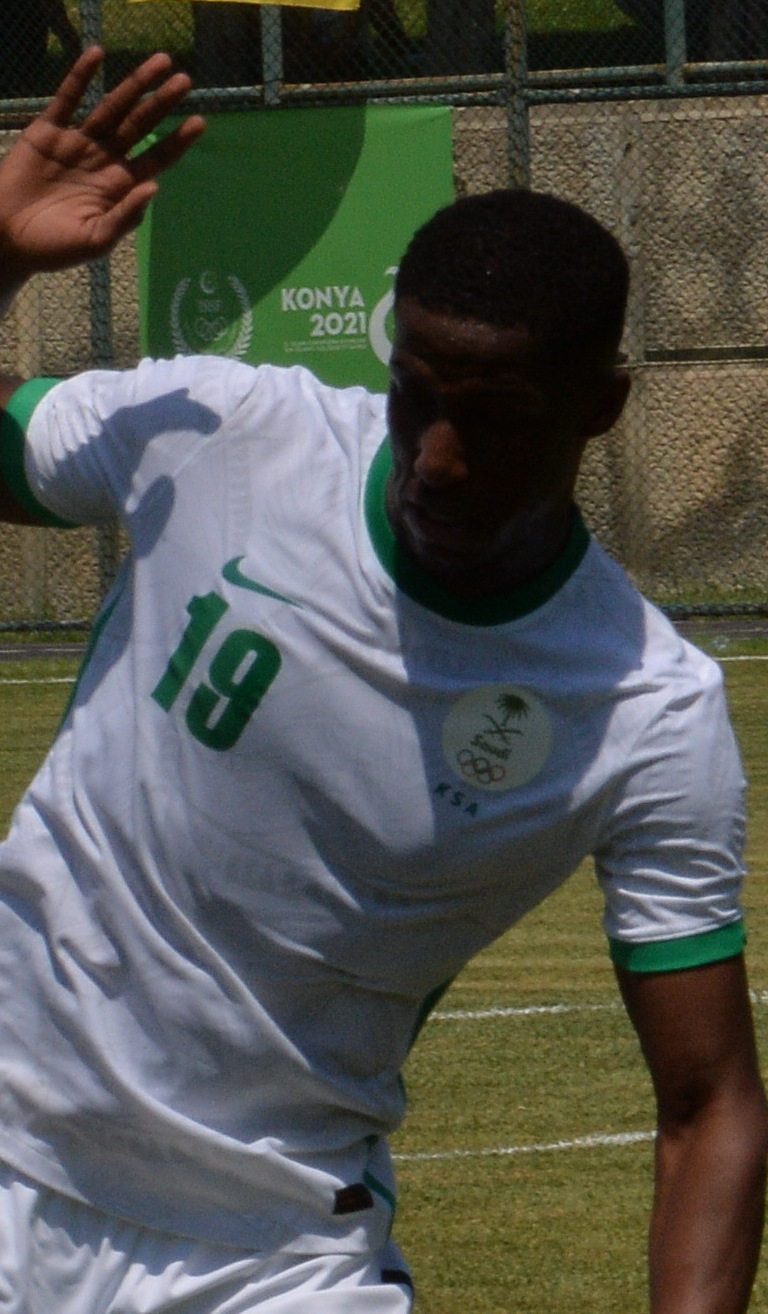
- Al-Sebyani playing for Saudi Arabia U23 in 2021

Personal information
- Full name: Meshal Khairallah Al-Sebyani
- Date of birth: 11 April 2001 (age 25)
- Place of birth: Saudi Arabia
- Height: 1.77 m (5 ft 10 in)
- Position: Defender

Team information
- Current team: Al-Ettifaq
- Number: 87

Youth career
- –2019: Al-Faisaly

Senior career*
Years	Team	Apps	(Gls)
2019–2024	Al-Faisaly	36	(1)
2024–	Al-Ettifaq	18	(0)

International career^{‡}
2021–2024	Saudi Arabia U23		
2021–	Saudi Arabia	2	(0)
Medal record
Men's football
Representing Saudi Arabia
Islamic Solidarity Games
Silver medal – second place	2021 Konya
- * Club domestic league appearances and goals as of 5 November 2026 ‡ National team caps and goals as of 4 December 2021

Meshal Khairallah Al-Sebyani (Arabic: مشعل خير الله الصبياني; born 11 April 2001) is a Saudi Arabian professional footballer who plays as a defender for Al-Ettifaq.

== Career ==
Al-Sebyani was a member of the youth team of Al-Faisaly. He made his debut for the first team in 2019.

On 6 August 2024, Al-Sebyani joined Al-Ettifaq on a three-year deal.

== Honours ==
Al-Faisaly

- King Cup: 2020–21

Saudi Arabia U23

- AFC U-23 Asian Cup: 2022
- WAFF U-23 Championship: 2022
