= Romain Amalfitano =

French footballer (born 1989)

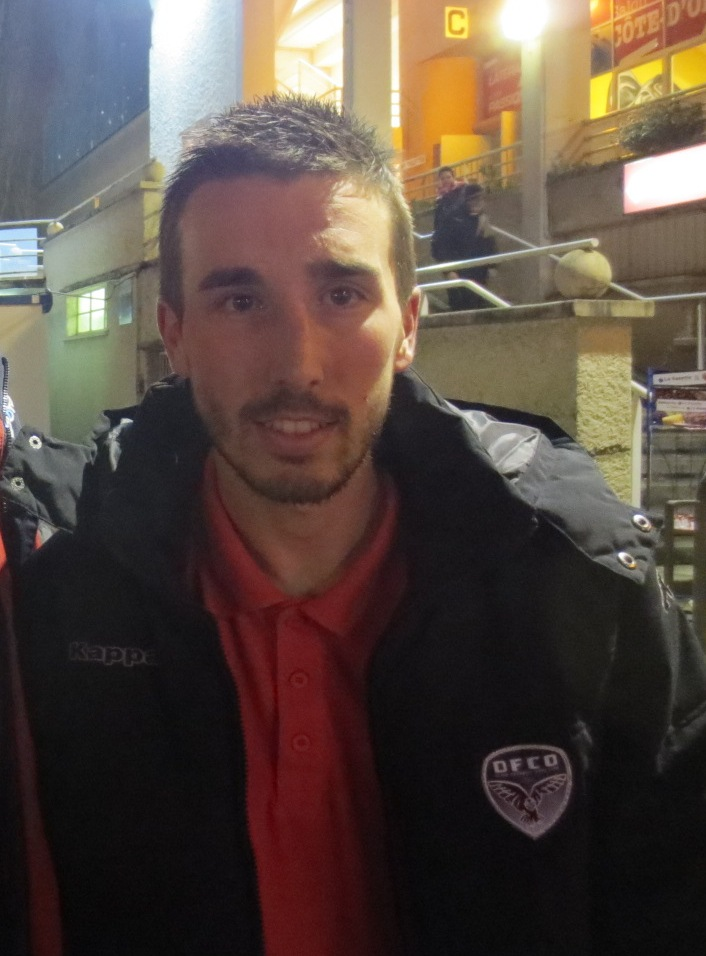
- Amalfitano in 2013

Personal information
- Full name: Romain Grégoire Clément Amalfitano
- Date of birth: 27 August 1989 (age 37)
- Place of birth: Nice, Alpes-Maritimes, France
- Height: 1.75 m (5 ft 9 in)
- Position: Attacking midfielder

Youth career
- 2003–2009: Châteauroux

Senior career*
| Years | Team | Apps | (Gls) |
| 2009–2010 | Evian | 22 | (3) |
| 2010–2012 | Reims | 58 | (6) |
| 2012–2014 | Newcastle United | 0 | (0) |
| 2013–2014 | → Dijon (loan) | 24 | (2) |
| 2014–2020 | Dijon | 182 | (5) |
| 2020–2022 | Al-Faisaly | 40 | (5) |
| 2022–2023 | Western Sydney Wanderers | 25 | (3) |
- * Club domestic league appearances and goals as of 10 May 2023

Romain Grégoire Clément Amalfitano (born 27 August 1989) is a French professional footballer who last played as an attacking midfielder for Western Sydney Wanderers. He previously played for Reims, Châteauroux, Evian, Newcastle United, Dijon FCO and Al-Faisaly.

== Career ==
=== Châteauroux ===
Born in Nice, Alpes-Maritimes, Amalfitano joined the Châteauroux academy, where he played until the end of the 2009 season.

=== Evian ===
He began his professional career at Evian, playing in 28 games for them in the 2009–10 Championnat National, where Evian finished as champions.

=== Reims ===
He then signed a two-year deal with Stade de Reims, scoring 10 goals in his 58 appearances for the club. The team finished 10th in the 2010–11 Ligue 2 and second in the 2011–12 Ligue 2, winning promotion to Ligue 1.

=== Newcastle United ===
On 1 July 2012, Amalfitano signed for Premier League team Newcastle United on a three-year contract. Amalfitano joined Newcastle on a free transfer after his contract at Reims expired on 30 June 2012. He made his club debut in a friendly match that ended in a 1–0 defeat away to 3. Liga club Chemnitzer FC on 13 July. He made his competitive debut for the club in a Europa League tie against Atromitos F.C. on 23 August, which ended with a 1–1 scoreline. Amalfitano made his first start for the club in Madeira when Newcastle played Maritimo in their opening group stage game of the Europa League, the match ended 0–0. He made four appearances in total for Newcastle, all in the Europa League.

=== Dijon ===
On 4 September 2013, it was announced that Amalfitano had joined Dijon FCO on loan. On 1 July 2014, he signed a permanent three-year deal with the club on a free transfer.

=== Al-Faisaly ===
On 25 October 2020, Amalfitano signed with Saudi Professional League club Al-Faisaly. On 31 January 2022, he was released by Al-Faisaly.

=== Western Sydney Wanderers ===
On 4 June 2022, Amalfitano signed with A-League Men club Western Sydney Wanderers.

In May 2023, it was announced that Amalfitano was leaving the club at the end of his contract.

== Personal life ==
He is the younger brother of Morgan Amalfitano.

== Career statistics ==
As of 30 May 2021

Appearances and goals by club, season and competition
| Club | Season | League | | | National Cup | | League Cup | | Continental | | Total | |
| Club | Season | Division | Apps | Goals | Apps | Goals | Apps | Goals | Apps | Goals | Apps | Goals |
|---|---|---|---|---|---|---|---|---|---|---|---|---|
| Evian | 2009–10 | Ligue 2 | 22 | 3 | 2 | 0 | 0 | 0 | — | | 24 | 3 |
| Reims | 2010–11 | Ligue 2 | 32 | 3 | 4 | 4 | 2 | 0 | — | | 38 | 7 |
| Reims | 2011–12 | Ligue 2 | 26 | 3 | 0 | 0 | 1 | 0 | — | | 27 | 3 |
| Reims | Total | | 58 | 6 | 4 | 4 | 3 | 0 | — | | 65 | 10 |
| Newcastle United | 2012–13 | Premier League | 0 | 0 | 0 | 0 | 0 | 0 | 5 (Note: Appearances in UEFA Europa League) | 0 | 5 | 0 |
| Dijon (loan) | 2013–14 | Ligue 2 | 24 | 2 | 3 | 0 | 0 | 0 | — | | 27 | 2 |
| Dijon | 2014–15 | Ligue 2 | 28 | 1 | 1 | 0 | 1 | 0 | — | | 30 | 1 |
| Dijon | 2015–16 | Ligue 2 | 35 | 3 | 0 | 0 | 4 | 0 | — | | 39 | 4 |
| Dijon | 2016–17 | Ligue 1 | 26 | 0 | 2 | 0 | 1 | 0 | — | | 29 | 0 |
| Dijon | 2017–18 | Ligue 1 | 33 | 0 | 1 | 0 | 1 | 0 | — | | 35 | 0 |
| Dijon | 2018–19 | Ligue 1 | 32 | 0 | 3 | 0 | 2 | 0 | 1 | 0 | 38 | 0 |
| Dijon | 2019–20 | Ligue 1 | 26 | 1 | 2 | 0 | 1 | 0 | – | | 29 | 1 |
| Dijon | 2020–21 | Ligue 1 | 2 | 0 | 0 | 0 | 0 | 0 | – | | 2 | 0 |
| Dijon | Total | | 182 | 3 | 9 | 0 | 10 | 0 | 1 | 0 | 202 | 5 |
| Al-Faisaly | 2020–21 | Saudi Pro League | 23 | 1 | 3 | 0 | – | | – | | 26 | 1 |
| Career total | | | 309 | 17 | 21 | 4 | 13 | 0 | 6 | 0 | 349 | 21 |

== Honours ==
Al-Faisaly

- King Cup: 2020–21
