= Mohammed Al-Nukhylan =

Saudi Arabian footballer

Personal information
- Full name: Mohammed Ziad Mohammed Al-Nukhylan
- Date of birth: 18 February 2002 (age 24)
- Place of birth: Saudi Arabia
- Position: Midfielder

Team information
- Current team: Al-Shoulla
- Number: 17

Youth career
- –2020: Al-Faisaly

Senior career*
Years	Team	Apps	(Gls)
2020–2024	Al-Faisaly	5	(0)
2023–2024	→ Al-Shoulla (loan)	15	(0)
2024–	Al-Shoulla		
- * Club domestic league appearances and goals as of 30 March 2024

Mohammed Al-Nukhylan (Arabic: محمد النخيلان; born 18 February 2002), is a Saudi Arabian professional footballer who plays as a midfielder for Al-Shoulla.

== Career ==
On 20 September 2023, Al-Nukhylan joined Second Division side Al-Shoulla on loan. On 10 September 2024, Al-Nukhylan joined Al-Shoulla on a permanent deal.

== Career statistics ==
=== Club ===
As of 22 September 2020.

Club	Season	League			Cup		Continental		Other		Total	
Club	Season	Division	Apps	Goals	Apps	Goals	Apps	Goals	Apps	Goals	Apps	Goals
Al-Faisaly	2019–20	Saudi Professional League	1	0	0	0	0	0	0	0	1	0
Career total			1	0	0	0	0	0	0	0	1	0

== Honours ==
=== Club ===
Al-Faisaly

- King Cup: 2020–21
