= Hicham Faik =

Dutch footballer (born 1993)

Personal information
- Full name: Hicham Faik
- Date of birth: 19 March 1993 (age 33)
- Place of birth: The Hague, Netherlands
- Height: 1.88 m (6 ft 2 in)
- Position: Midfielder

Youth career
- 2002–2012: ADO Den Haag

Senior career*
| Years | Team | Apps | (Gls) |
| 2012–2014 | Almere City | 61 | (4) |
| 2014–2016 | Roda JC | 59 | (6) |
| 2016–2018 | Excelsior | 55 | (9) |
| 2018–2019 | Zulte Waregem | 16 | (3) |
| 2019–2020 | Heerenveen | 26 | (3) |
| 2020–2022 | Al-Faisaly | 55 | (5) |
| 2022–2023 | Al-Ahli | 27 | (3) |
| 2023–2026 | Al-Bukiryah | 46 | (11) |
- * Club domestic league appearances and goals as of 30 June 2026

Hicham Faik (born 19 March 1993) is a Dutch professional footballer who most recently played as a midfielder for Saudi Arabian club Al-Bukiryah.

== Club career ==
The left-footed midfielder formerly played for Almere City and moved to Roda JC on a free in 2014. He joined Excelsior on a 2-year contract in summer 2016 after Roda released him. On 9 April 2018, it was announced Faik had signed a three-year deal with Belgian First Division A side Zulte Waregem, but he left the club for Heerenveen a year later. After another one-year spell, Faik moved to the Middle East when joining Saudi side Al-Faisaly.

On 6 September 2022, Faik joined Al-Ahli on a one-year deal.

On 30 July 2023, Faik joined Al-Bukiryah on a free transfer.

== Personal life ==
Faik is of Moroccan descent.

== Honours ==
Al-Faisaly

- King Cup: 2020–21
