= Al Faisaly FC =

Association football club in Almajmaah, Saudi Arabia

Al-Faisaly KSA
- Full name: Al-Faisaly Saudi Football Club
- Nicknames: Al-Annabi (The Burgundy); Annabi Sudair (The Burgundy of Sudair)
- Founded: 1954; 72 years ago
- Ground: Al-Majma'ah Sports City, Al-Majma'ah
- Capacity: 6,266
- Chairman: Abdulmajeed Al-Omaim
- Head coach: Mohamed Dahmane (Caretaker)
- League: Saudi Pro League
- 2025–26: FDL, 2nd of 18
- Website: alfaisalyfc.net
Home colours	Away colours

Al-Faisaly KSA FC (Arabic: نادي الفيصلي) is a Saudi Arabian football club based in Harmah. The club currently competes in the Saudi Pro League.

== History ==
The club is named after King Faisal (r. 1964–75), who was crown prince at the time of the club's founding.

Al Faisaly finished as the runner-up in the 2005–06 first division season, thus becoming the first club from the Sudair region to achieve promotion to the top flight but went straight back down after just one season. Al Faisaly achieved promotion for the second time to the top flight by winning the 2009–10 first division title, and have been competing in the Saudi Professional League until they were relegated in the 2021–22 season after twelve consecutive seasons in the top flight.

During the 2017–18 season, Al Faisaly managed to reach the 2018 King Cup Final for the first time in their history, but fell short to Al Ittihad, losing 3–1 in extra time. Al Faisaly reached their second King Cup Final in four years, but this time they managed to win 3–2 against Al Taawon in the 2020–21 King Cup edition with Júlio Tavares scoring a hat-trick to secure their first ever top flight title, as well as their first AFC Champions League qualification. Al Faisaly also qualified to the 2021 Saudi Super Cup after winning their first ever King Cup title on 27 May 2021. Al-Faisaly was defeated in the super cup by Al-Hilal (4–3) on penalties after 2–2 draw.

=== AFC Champions League debut ===
The club's debut campaign in the 2022 AFC Champions League was a massive success against all odds, Al Faisaly pulled off a surprising upset by winning 2–1 over Qatari giants and two-times AFC Champions League winners Al Sadd. Al Faisaly managed to top their group in Group E with 2 wins, 3 draw and 1 lost which by doing so, the club advanced to the Round of 16 facing against Iranian side, Foolad, However the club lost 1–0 on aggregate and bowed out from the AFC Champions League.

== Current squad ==
As of 25 October 2025

Note: Flags indicate national team as defined under FIFA eligibility rules; some limited exceptions apply. Players may hold more than one non-FIFA nationality.

No.	Pos.	Nation	Player
1	GK	ESP	Fernando Pacheco
2	DF	KSA	Yassin Barnawi
3	DF	KSA	Khaled Al-Harbi
4	DF	SEN	Abdoulaye Seck
5	DF	BRA	Andrei Girotto
6	MF	KSA	Eid Al-Muwallad (on loan from Al-Ahli)
7	FW	KSA	Yousef Al-Shammari
8	MF	BRA	Flávio Medeiros
10	MF	COD	Théo Bongonda
11	MF	GAB	André-Jordy Ella
13	FW	CMR	Christian Bassogog
14	MF	KSA	Abdullah Al-Mogren
18	MF	KSA	Mohammed Al-Oqil
19	FW	GBS	Alexandre Mendy
20	MF	ESP	Jaime Seoane
21	GK	KSA	Abdulelah Nassief

No.	Pos.	Nation	Player
24	MF	KSA	Abdulaziz Al-Bishi
25	DF	KSA	Muaiad Saleem
26	GK	KSA	Mohammed Al-Hassawi
28	FW	NGR	Dayo Joyce
30	DF	KSA	Meshari Shetaimi
37	MF	KSA	Wael Kedan
50	DF	KSA	Mohammed Al-Shanqiti
70	DF	KSA	Mohammed Jahfali
71	FW	KSA	Ahmed Abdu Jaber
77	MF	KSA	Abdulrahman Al-Shareef
82	DF	KSA	Hussain Al-Zarie (on loan from Al-Diriyah)
87	DF	KSA	Abdullah Bin Subayt
88	DF	KSA	Saoud Haddad
95	MF	KSA	Ayman Fallatah (on loan from Al-Ahli)
—	MF	KSA	Abdulrahman Al-Safri

=== Out on loan ===
Note: Flags indicate national team as defined under FIFA eligibility rules; some limited exceptions apply. Players may hold more than one non-FIFA nationality.

No.	Pos.	Nation	Player
22	DF	KSA	Mishal Haddad (at Al-Jandal)
44	DF	KSA	Fawaz Rabee (at Al-Anwar)
91	DF	KSA	Rayan Fallatah (at Jeddah)
99	DF	KSA	Ahmed Al Muhaimeed (at Al-Jabalain)

No.	Pos.	Nation	Player
—	DF	KSA	Abdullah Al-Rashidi (at Al-Anwar)
—	MF	KSA	Ahmed Al-Badah (at Al-Najma)
—	MF	KSA	Malik Hamza (at Al-Saqer)

== Club staff ==
Role	Name
Head coach	(Tunisia) Mohamed Dahmane (Caretaker)
Assistant coach	(Saudi Arabia) Alhomaidi Al-Otaibi
Goalkeeper Coach	(Spain) Borja Montero
Rehab Coach	(Spain) Carlos Bartolomé
Video analyst	(Brazil) Marcos Paulo Mattos
Opponent analyst	(Germany) Amin Msalmi
Performance analyst	(Saudi Arabia) Majed Al-Sultan
General manager	(Saudi Arabia) Muhammad Abdullah Al-Mutairi
General Supervisor	(Saudi Arabia) Medlej Abdul Mohsen Al-Madelj
Team secretary	(Egypt) Alaa El Din Saleh Mohamed Ahmed
Team coordinator	(Saudi Arabia) Muhammad Abdul Karim Al-Olayan

== Managers ==
- (Tunisia) Youssef Baati (1989 – 1990)
- (Tunisia) Skander Baklouti (1993 – 1996, 6 July 2001 – 1 May 2002)
- (Tunisia) Tariq El Mrabet (1998)
- (Tunisia) Taher Lamine (1 July 1999 – 6 December 1999)
- (Tunisia) Al Nasser Abou Zaid (6 December 1999 – 1 May 2000)
- (Tunisia) Mohammed Khalil (1 August 2000 – 1 May 2001)
- (Tunisia) Zouhair Louati (1 August 2002 – 1 May 2003)
- (Tunisia) Hassine Menestiri (25 July 2003 – 15 April 2004)
- (Egypt) Bolbol Bayoumy (caretaker) (15 April 2004 – 30 May 2004)
- (Egypt) Mohammed El Sayed (8 July 2004 – 30 March 2005, 29 March 2008 – 19 April 2008)
- (Tunisia) Mondher Ladhari (30 March 2005 – 31 May 2005)
- (Tunisia) Lotfi El Hashmi (25 June 2005 – 28 November 2005)
- (Algeria) Adlène bin Abderrahmane (28 November 2005 – 2 March 2006)
- (Tunisia) Nasser Nefzi (2 March 2006 – 1 May 2006)
- (Portugal) José Morais (17 July 2006 – 16 December 2006)
- (Egypt) Mamdouh Ouka (caretaker) (16 December 2006 – 6 January 2007)
- (France) Bernard Simondi (6 January 2007 – 30 May 2007)
- (Brazil) Carlos Dante (30 June 2007 – 10 November 2007)
- (Tunisia) Abderrazek Chebbi (10 November 2007 – 16 February 2008)
- (Tunisia) Mourad Ajmi (16 February 2008 – 29 March 2008)
- (Tunisia) Nouri Rouatbi (19 April 2008 – 1 June 2008)
- (Tunisia) Hadi Ben Mokhtar (23 July 2008 – 9 May 2010)
- (Croatia) Zlatko Dalić (19 May 2010 – 30 April 2012)
- (Belgium) Marc Brys (2 June 2012 – 7 December 2013)
- (Morocco) Issame Charaï (caretaker) (7 December 2013 – 15 December 2013)
- (Egypt) Mohammed El Sayed (caretaker) (15 December 2013 – 27 December 2013)
- (Italy) Giovanni Solinas (27 December 2013 – 1 May 2014)
- (Belgium) Stéphane Demol (21 May 2014 – 14 March 2015)
- (Portugal) Toni Conceição (14 March 2015 – 22 May 2015)
- (Romania) Liviu Ciobotariu (6 June 2015 – 17 May 2016)
- (Brazil) Hélio dos Anjos (23 May 2016 – 9 November 2016)
- (Morocco) Fahd Elouarga (caretaker) (9 November 2016 – 19 November 2016)
- (Croatia) Tomislav Ivković (19 November 2016 – 19 February 2017)
- (Italy) Giovanni Solinas (20 February 2017 – 5 May 2017)
- (Serbia) Vuk Rašović (29 May 2017 – 3 May 2018)
- (Romania) Mircea Rednic (2 July 2018 – 8 October 2018)
- (Brazil) Péricles Chamusca (14 October 2018 – 1 June 2021)
- (Italy) Paolo Tramezzani (18 June 2021 – 7 October 2021)
- (Portugal) Daniel Ramos (7 October 2021 – 24 February 2022)
- (Morocco) Fahd Elouarga (caretaker) (24 February 2022 – 27 February 2022)
- (Greece) Marinos Ouzounidis (27 February 2022 – 30 June 2022)
- (Croatia) Ante Miše (12 July 2022 – 19 January 2023)
- (Greece) Marinos Ouzounidis (21 January 2023 – 16 March 2023)
- (Italy) Giovanni Solinas (16 March 2023 – 31 May 2023)
- (Belgium) Yves Vanderhaeghe (15 June 2023 – 15 November 2023)
- (Brazil) Marcelo Chamusca (16 November 2023 – 31 May 2024)
- (Portugal) Filipe Gouveia (6 June 2024 – 28 November 2024)
- (Saudi Arabia) Alhomaidi Al-Otaibi (caretaker) (28 November 2024 – 30 December 2024)
- (Spain) Pablo Franco (30 December 2024 – 1 June 2025)
- (Italy) Giovanni Solinas (27 July 2025 – 22 November 2026)
- (Tunisia) Mohamed Dahmane (Caretaker) (22 Novemeber 2026 –)

== International competitions ==
=== Overview ===
As of 20 February 2023

Competition	Pld	W	D	L	GF	GA
AFC Champions League	7	2	3	2	5	5
Arab Club Champions Cup	3	0	1	2	4	7
GCC Champions League	9	3	2	4	9	11
TOTAL	19	5	6	8	18	23

=== Record by country ===
Country	Pld	W	D	L	GF	GA	GD	Win%
Bahrain	4	1	1	2	2	3	−1	25.00
Iran	1	0	0	1	0	1	−1	0.00
Jordan	2	0	2	0	2	2	+0	0.00
Kuwait	2	1	0	1	2	2	+0	50.00
Lebanon	1	0	0	1	1	2	−1	0.00
Mauritania	1	0	0	1	1	3	−2	0.00
Qatar	2	1	0	1	2	2	+0	50.00
Saudi Arabia	1	0	0	1	0	2	−2	0.00
Tunisia	1	0	1	0	2	2	+0	0.00
United Arab Emirates	2	1	1	0	5	4	+1	50.00
Uzbekistan	2	1	1	0	1	0	+1	50.00
TOTAL	19	5	6	8	18	23	−5	26.32

=== International record ===
==== Matches ====
Season	Competition	Round	Club	Home	Away	Aggregate
2012–13	GCC Champions League	Group D	(Bahrain) Al-Busaiteen	0–0	1−0	1st
2012–13	GCC Champions League	Group D	(United Arab Emirates) Baniyas	4–3	1–1	1st
2012–13	GCC Champions League	Quarter-finals	(Saudi Arabia) Najran	0–2	–	0–2
2015	GCC Champions League	Group D	(Kuwait) Al-Jahra	0–1	2−1	3rd
2015	GCC Champions League	Group D	(Bahrain) East Riffa	1–2	0–1	3rd
2018–19	Arab Club Champions Cup	Play-off round	(Tunisia) Club Africain	2–2		4th
2018–19	Arab Club Champions Cup	Play-off round	(Lebanon) Al-Nejmeh	1–2		4th
2018–19	Arab Club Champions Cup	Play-off round	(Mauritania) ASAC Concorde	1–3		4th
2022	AFC Champions League	Group E	(Jordan) Al-Wehdat	1–1	1–1	1st
2022	AFC Champions League	Group E	(Qatar) Al-Sadd	2–1	0–1	1st
2022	AFC Champions League	Group E	(Uzbekistan) Nasaf Qarshi	0–0	1–0	1st
2022	AFC Champions League	Round of 16	(Iran) Foolad	0–1		0–1

== Honours ==
- Saudi First Division League (tier 2)
  - Winners (1): 2009–10
  - Runners-up (1): 2005–06 2025-2026
- Saudi Second Division League (tier 3)
  - Winners (1): 2002–03
- Saudi Third Division League (tier 4)
  - Runners-up (1): 2000–01
- Prince Faisal bin Fahd Cup for Division 1 and 2 Teams
  - Winners (1): 2005–06
- King's Cup
  - Winners (1): 2020–21
  - Runners-up (1): 2018
- Saudi Super Cup
  - Runners-up (1): 2021

== See also ==
- List of football clubs in Saudi Arabia
