= 2018–19 Al-Hazem F.C. season =

Al-Hazem
2018–19 season
- President: Abdullah Al-Meqhim
- Manager: Daniel Isăilă
- Stadium: Al-Hazem Club Stadium
- Pro League: 13th
- King Cup: Round of 32 (knocked out by Al-Jeel)
- Top goalscorer: League: Mohammed Al-Saiari (10 goals); All: Mohammed Al-Saiari (11 goals)
- Highest home attendance: 6,200 vs Al-Hilal (4 April 2019); 6,200 vs Al-Nassr (11 May 2019)
- Lowest home attendance: 802 vs Al-Shabab (28 December 2018)
- Average home league attendance: 2,051
Home colours	Away colours
- All statistics correct as of 24 May 2019.

The 2018–19 season was Al-Hazem's 62nd season in their existence and their seventh in the Saudi Professional League. Al-Hazem were promoted to the top tier of Saudi football for the first time since 2011 during the 2017–18 season. Along with competing in the Pro League, the club also participated in the King Cup.

The season covers the period from 1 July 2018 to 30 June 2019.

== Players ==
=== Squad information ===
As of 4 February 2019

Note: Flags indicate national team as defined under FIFA eligibility rules; some limited exceptions apply. Players may hold more than one non-FIFA nationality.

No.	Pos.	Nation	Player
2	DF	KSA	Abdulrahman Al-Rio (on loan from Al-Ittihad)
3	DF	KSA	Khaled Al-Barakah
4	DF	BRA	Alemão
7	MF	KSA	Abdulwahab Jaafer
8	MF	BRA	Rodolfo
10	FW	NGA	Kennedy Igboananike
11	MF	POR	Diogo Salomão
12	DF	KSA	Salem Al-Hamdan
15	FW	KSA	Mojahed Al-Munee (on loan from Al-Hilal)
16	MF	KSA	Ismael Musallami
17	MF	KSA	Fares Al-Ayyaf
18	FW	KSA	Hammad Al-Shaya
20	DF	KSA	Abdullah Al Harbi
21	GK	KSA	Dawod Al Saeed
22	GK	KSA	Abdullah Abdulhameed

No.	Pos.	Nation	Player
23	DF	GEO	Zurab Tsiskaridze
24	MF	KSA	Maher Al Mutairi
25	MF	KSA	Muaz Al-Fallah
26	MF	COL	Jhon Pajoy
27	MF	KSA	Saeed Al-Dossari
30	GK	ALG	Malik Asselah
32	DF	KSA	Masoud Bakheet
33	GK	KSA	Abdulrahman Dagriri
37	MF	KSA	Osama Al-Khalaf (on loan from Al-Ettifaq)
43	DF	KSA	Abdulrahman Al-Dakheel
70	FW	KSA	Mohammed Al-Saiari (on loan from Al-Ettifaq)
71	MF	KSA	Mohammed Harzan (on loan from Al-Taawoun)
77	DF	KSA	Saif Al-Qeshtah
88	MF	BRA	Muralha
99	FW	KSA	Ali Khormi

== Transfers ==
=== In ===
Date	Pos.	Name	Previous club	Fee	Source
10 June 2018	GK	(Algeria) Malik Asselah	(Algeria) Kabylie	Free	
10 June 2018	MF	(Syria) Youssef Kalfa	(United Arab Emirates) Emirates	Undisclosed	
12 June 2018	MF	(Saudi Arabia) Abdulwahab Jaafer	(Saudi Arabia) Al-Shabab	Free	
13 June 2018	MF	(Brazil) Rodolfo	(Brazil) CRB	Undisclosed	
22 June 2018	MF	(Colombia) Jhon Pajoy	(Mexico) Pachuca	Undisclosed	
25 June 2018	GK	(Saudi Arabia) Abdulrahman Dagriri	(Saudi Arabia) Al-Fayha	Undisclosed	
26 June 2018	MF	(Ecuador) Carlos Feraud	(Ecuador) Macará	Undisclosed	
30 June 2018	MF	(Brazil) Muralha	(South Korea) Seongnam	Undisclosed	
29 July 2018	DF	(Brazil) Alemão	(Brazil) Avaí	Undisclosed	
31 July 2018	MF	(Saudi Arabia) Fares Al-Ayyaf	(Saudi Arabia) Al-Raed	Undisclosed	
19 August 2018	FW	(Bolivia) Gilbert Álvarez	(Bolivia) Jorge Wilstermann	Undisclosed	
7 January 2019	DF	(Georgia (country)) Zurab Tsiskaridze	(Sweden) Eskilstuna	Free	
9 January 2019	FW	(Nigeria) Kennedy Igboananike	(Sweden) Örebro	Free	
3 February 2019	MF	(Portugal) Diogo Salomão	(Romania) Dinamo București	Free	
4 February 2019	MF	(Saudi Arabia) Saeed Al-Dossari	(Saudi Arabia) Al-Taawoun	Free	

=== Loans in ===
Date	Pos.	Name	Parent club	End date	Source
12 June 2018	FW	(Saudi Arabia) Mohammed Al-Saiari	(Saudi Arabia) Al-Ettifaq	End of season	
12 June 2018	FW	(Saudi Arabia) Mojahed Al-Munee	(Saudi Arabia) Al-Hilal	End of season	
25 July 2018	DF	(Saudi Arabia) Salem Ali	(Saudi Arabia) Al-Nassr	25 January 2019	
23 August 2018	DF	(Saudi Arabia) Abdulrahman Al-Rio	(Saudi Arabia) Al-Ittihad	End of season	
5 January 2019	MF	(Saudi Arabia) Mohammed Harzan	(Saudi Arabia) Al-Taawoun	End of season	
7 January 2019	MF	(Saudi Arabia) Osama Al-Khalaf	(Saudi Arabia) Al-Ettifaq	End of season	

=== Out ===
Date	Pos.	Name	New club	Fee	Source
25 March 2018	MF	(Saudi Arabia) Mohammed Al-Balawi	(Saudi Arabia) Al-Nojoom	Free	
6 June 2018	DF	(Saudi Arabia) Amjed Barnawi	(Saudi Arabia) Al-Washm	Free	
7 June 2018	MF	(Algeria) Bouazza Feham	(Algeria) MC Oran	Free	
30 June 2018	GK	(Saudi Arabia) Mohammed Al-Haiti	(Saudi Arabia) Al-Ettifaq	End of loan	
9 July 2018	DF	(Saudi Arabia) Saud Mekbesh	(Saudi Arabia) Al-Qaisumah	Free	
17 July 2018	MF	(Saudi Arabia) Sultan Al-Nemri	(Saudi Arabia) Al-Arabi	Free	
17 July 2018	FW	(Saudi Arabia) Ahmed Al-Zaaq	Released		
18 July 2018	MF	(Saudi Arabia) Saeed Al-Qarni	(Saudi Arabia) Al-Ain	Free	
19 July 2018	FW	(Guinea) Ousmane Pato	(Saudi Arabia) Al-Orobah	Free	
25 August 2018	FW	(Saudi Arabia) Mohammed Al-Bishi	(Saudi Arabia) Al-Nojoom	Free	
4 September 2018	MF	(Saudi Arabia) Moayad Al-Tolayhi	(Saudi Arabia) Al-Kholood	Free	
15 September 2018	FW	(Saudi Arabia) Khaled Al-Lazam	(Tunisia) Bizertin	Undisclosed	
24 December 2018	FW	(Bolivia) Gilbert Álvarez	(Bolivia) Jorge Wilstermann	Free	
15 January 2019	MF	(Ecuador) Carlos Feraud	Released		
16 January 2019	MF	(Sudan) Saeed Mustafa	(Saudi Arabia) Damac	Free	
2 February 2019	MF	(Saudi Arabia) Tareq Al-Kaebi	Released		
4 February 2019	MF	(Syria) Youssef Kalfa	(Saudi Arabia) Al-Qadsiah	Undisclosed	

=== Loans out ===
Date	Pos.	Name	To	End date	Source
3 February 2019	FW	(Saudi Arabia) Hamed Al Maqati	(Saudi Arabia) Al-Ain	End of season	

== Pre-season friendlies ==
25 July 2018 Friendly	Al-Hazem (Saudi Arabia)	1–4	(Saudi Arabia) Al-Taawoun	Al-Bukayriyah, Saudi Arabia
19:45 AST	Al-Munee 70'	Report	Héldon 6', 13'; Tawamba 30'; Al-Hussain 38'	Stadium: Al-Amal Club Stadium

4 August 2018 Friendly	Al-Hazem (Saudi Arabia)	0–1	(Saudi Arabia) Al-Qadsiah	Leobersdorf, Austria
18:00 CEST		Report	Fallatah 33'	Stadium: Sportanlage Leobersdorf

7 August 2018 Friendly	Al-Hazem (Saudi Arabia)	3–1	(Croatia) Osijek	Leobersdorf, Austria
18:00 CEST	Kalfa 19'; Muralha 88'; Al-Saiari 90'	Report	Pilj 45'	Stadium: Sportanlage Leobersdorf

16 August 2018 Friendly	Al-Hazem (Saudi Arabia)	8–0	(Austria) Süßenbrunn	Vienna, Austria
18:00 CEST	Rodolfo 3'; Kalfa 13'; Al-Ayyaf 19'; Pajoy 28'; Alemão 42'; Al-Maqati 52', 60', 72'	Report		Stadium: Sportplatz Süssenbrunn

== Competitions ==
=== Overall ===
Competition	Started round	Current position / round	Final position / round	First match	Last match
Saudi Pro League	—	—	13th	31 August 2018	16 May 2019
King Cup	Round of 64	—	Round of 32	2 January 2019	17 January 2019

Last Updated: 16 May 2019

=== Saudi Pro League ===
==== League table ====
Pos	Team	Pld	W	D	L	GF	GA	GD	Pts	Qualification or relegation
11	Al-Ettifaq	30	8	9	13	40	55	−15	33	
12	Al-Fayha	30	9	5	16	36	52	−16	32	
13	Al-Hazem (O)	30	7	10	13	33	50	−17	31	Qualification for Relegation play-offs
14	Al-Qadsiah (R)	30	8	4	18	34	51	−17	28	Relegation to Prince Mohammad bin Salman League
15	Al-Batin (R)	30	7	4	19	29	53	−24	25	Relegation to Prince Mohammad bin Salman League

Source: spl.com
Rules for classification: 1) Points; 2) Head-to-head points; 3) Head-to-head goal difference; 4) Total goal difference; 5) Total goals scored; 6) Play-off (only for deciding champion, relegation and AFC competitions participation).
(O) Play-off winners; (R) Relegated

==== Results summary ====
Overall								Home						Away					
Pld	W	D	L	GF	GA	GD	Pts	W	D	L	GF	GA	GD	W	D	L	GF	GA	GD
30	7	10	13	33	50	−17	31	5	4	6	16	23	−7	2	6	7	17	27	−10

Last updated: 16 May 2019.
Source: Competitive matches

==== Results by round ====
Round	1	2	3	4	5	6	7	8	9	10	11	12	13	14	15	16	17	18	19	20	21	22	23	24	25	26	27	28	29	30
Ground	H	H	A	H	A	H	A	A	A	A	A	A	A	A	H	A	A	A	H	H	H	H	H	H	H	H	H	A	H	A
Result	D	D	L	W	L	W	L	L	D	D	D	L	W	L	L	D	D	W	L	W	D	L	D	L	W	L	W	L	L	D
Position	12	8	11	8	10	9	9	11	11	12	13	13	11	13	13	12	13	12	12	12	12	12	12	12	11	12	11	12	12	13

Updated to match(es) played on 16 May 2019. Source: Competitive matches
A = Away; H = Home; W = Win; D = Draw; L = Loss

==== Matches ====
All times are local, AST (UTC+3).

Win Draw Loss Postponed

30 August 2018 1	Al-Hazem	0–0	Al-Wehda	Buraidah
19:05	Al-Ayyaf (yellow card) 41'; Al-Barakah (yellow card) 81'	Report		Stadium: King Abdullah Sport City Stadium; Attendance: 2,133; Referee: Tobias Welz (Germany)

13 September 2018 2	Al-Hazem	1–1	Al-Taawoun	Buraidah
18:50	Kalfa (yellow card) 34'; Alemão (yellow card) 45'; Rodolfo 59'; Bakheet (yellow card) 88'; Al-Saiari (yellow card) 90+1'	Report	Al-Mousa (yellow card) 36'; Tawamba (yellow card) 45+2', (goal) 69'; Héldon (yellow card) 63'	Stadium: King Abdullah Sport City Stadium; Attendance: 1,155; Referee: Ivan Bebek (Croatia)

21 September 2018 3	Al-Ahli	2–0	Al-Hazem	Jeddah
20:35	Al-Mogahwi 3'; Al Somah 90+4'	Report	Muralha (yellow card) 46'; Alemão (yellow card) 75'; Al-Qeshtah (yellow card) 80'	Stadium: King Abdullah Sports City; Attendance: 41,315; Referee: Szymon Marciniak (Poland)

27 September 2018 4	Al-Hazem	2–1	Al-Faisaly	Buraidah
18:35	Rossi 53' (o.g.); Pajoy (yellow card) 72'; Alemão 90+4' (pen.)	Report	Rogerinho 6'; Calderón (yellow card) 13'	Stadium: King Abdullah Sport City Stadium; Attendance: 1,100; Referee: Damir Skomina (Slovenia)

5 October 2018 5	Al-Nassr	5–1	Al-Hazem	Riyadh
20:40	Musa 26'; Giuliano 47', 57'; Al-Jebreen (yellow card) 54'; Amrabat 74'; Al-Sahlawi 79'	Report	Rodolfo 32', (yellow card) 45+1'	Stadium: Prince Faisal bin Fahd Stadium; Attendance: 10,056; Referee: Mark Clattenburg (England)

18 October 2018 6	Al-Hazem	2–1	Al-Qadsiah	Buraidah
18:15	Al-Saiari 7', 47'; Muralha (yellow card) 51'	Report	Williams (yellow card) 27'; Bismark 52'; Sharahili (yellow card) 79'	Stadium: King Abdullah Sport City Stadium; Attendance: 1,350; Referee: Artur Soares Dias (Portugal)

25 October 2018 7	Al-Ettifaq	1–0	Al-Hazem	Dammam
17:40	Al-Habib (yellow card) 36'; Al-Kwikbi 45+3', (yellow card) 54'; Kiss (yellow card) 76'; El Sayed (yellow card) 90+3'	Report	Al-Munee (yellow card) 74'	Stadium: Prince Mohamed bin Fahd Stadium; Attendance: 4,109; Referee: Tiago Martins (Portugal)

1 November 2018 8	Al-Batin	1–0	Al-Hazem	Hafar al-Batin
18:00	Al-Ghamdi 67'; Ghunaiman (yellow card) 76'; Al-Sobhi (yellow card) 90+4'; Al-Shammari (yellow card) 90+7'	Report	Muralha (yellow card) 13'; Al-Barakah (yellow card) 90'; Rodolfo (yellow card) 90+5'	Stadium: Al-Batin Club Stadium; Attendance: 3,861; Referee: Bartosz Frankowski (Poland)

8 November 2018 9	Ohod	3–3	Al-Hazem	Medina
18:15	Ribamar 21', 90+4' (pen.); Abdulghani 61' (pen.); Al-Dhaw (yellow card) 64'	Report	Al-Saiari 7', 11', 72'; Al-Barakah (yellow card) 19'; Al-Ayyaf (yellow card) 49'	Stadium: Prince Mohammed bin Abdul Aziz Stadium; Attendance: 7,139; Referee: Szymon Marciniak (Poland)

22 November 2018 10	Al-Fayha	1–1	Al-Hazem	Al Majma'ah
17:50	Fernández 8' (pen.); Al-Sobhi (yellow card) 43'; Buhimed (yellow card) 58'	Report	Al-Saiari (yellow card) 43'; Rodolfo 62'	Stadium: King Salman Sport City Stadium; Attendance: 1,056; Referee: Damir Skomina (Slovenia)

2 December 2018 11	Al-Ittihad	2–2	Al-Hazem	Jeddah
18:15	Villanueva (yellow card) 31'; Romarinho 59'; Pešić (yellow card) 88'; Al-Harbi 90+1'	Report	Al-Ayyaf 3'; Al-Saiari 51'	Stadium: King Abdullah Sports City; Attendance: 15,905; Referee: Svein Oddvar Moen (Norway)

8 December 2018 12	Al-Fateh	3–2	Al-Hazem	Al-Hasa
17:30	Lajami 9'; Al-Qeshtah 55' (o.g.); Al-Juahaim 90+4'; Al-Majhad (yellow card) 90+8'	Report	Al-Saiari 40'; Al-Qeshtah (yellow card) 86'; Bakheet 90'	Stadium: Prince Abdullah bin Jalawi Stadium; Attendance: 1,779; Referee: Svein Oddvar Moen (Norway)

15 December 2018 13	Al-Hilal	1–2	Al-Hazem	Riyadh
15:05	Gomis 18'; Kadesh (yellow card) 80'	Report	Al-Saiari 46'; Muralha (yellow card) 75'; Alemão 80' (pen.); Asselah (yellow card) 90+1'; Al-Qeshtah (yellow card) 90+2'	Stadium: King Saud University Stadium; Attendance: 12,286; Referee: Milorad Mažić (Serbia)

20 December 2018 14	Al-Raed	1–0	Al-Hazem	Buraidah
15:20	Bangoura 60'; Al-Shehri (yellow card) 77'	Report	Bakheet (yellow card) 26' (yellow-red card) 42'; Pajoy (yellow card) 26'; Al-Saiari (yellow card) 75'	Stadium: King Abdullah Sport City Stadium; Attendance: 2,197; Referee: Artur Soares Dias (Portugal)

28 December 2018 15	Al-Hazem	1–3	Al-Shabab	Buraidah
15:20	Alemão 27'; Al-Kaebi (yellow card) 73'	Report	Arthur 7'; Găman 22'; Somália 71'	Stadium: King Abdullah Sport City Stadium; Attendance: 802; Referee: Björn Kuipers (Netherlands)

10 January 2019 16	Al-Taawoun	1–1	Al-Hazem	Buraidah
18:10	Al-Zubaidi (yellow card) 38'; Adam 90+4'	Report	Al-Qeshtah (yellow card) 3'; Bakheet 90+7'	Stadium: King Abdullah Sport City Stadium; Attendance: 1,473; Referee: Svein Oddvar Moen (Norway)

28 January 2019 17	Al-Wehda	1–1	Al-Hazem	Mecca
18:50	Abdu Jaber 3'; Bakshween (yellow card) 55'	Report	Igboananike 67'; Tsiskaridze (yellow card) 88'	Stadium: King Abdul Aziz Stadium; Attendance: 1,933; Referee: Daniel Stefanski (Poland)

3 February 2019 18	Al-Faisaly	1–2	Al-Hazem	Al Majma'ah
15:40	Hyland (yellow card) 20'; Al-Sowayed (yellow card) 30'; Denílson 55'	Report	Al-Barakah (yellow card) 2'; Al-Saiari (yellow card) 21'; Alemão (yellow card) 66'; Bakheet (yellow card) 71'; Pajoy 79'; Rodolfo (yellow card) 79'; Al-Khalaf 90+3'	Stadium: King Salman Sport City Stadium; Attendance: 561; Referee: Paweł Gil (Poland)

7 February 2019 19	Al-Hazem	2–4	Al-Ahli	Buraidah
20:15	Pajoy 14'; Al-Saiari (yellow card) 18', (goal) 34'; Bakheet (yellow card) 31'; Al-Qeshtah (yellow card) 45+2'; Al-Barakah (yellow card) 55'	Report	Asiri 9', (yellow card) 83'; Al-Qeshtah 16' (o.g.); Díaz (yellow card) 35'; Djaniny 50'; Stanciu (yellow card) 83'; Al Somah 90+4'	Stadium: King Abdullah Sport City Stadium; Attendance: 1,589; Referee: Artur Soares Dias (Portugal)

13 February 2019 20	Al-Hazem	1–0	Al-Batin	Ar Rass
15:50	Tsiskaridze (yellow card) 33'; Al-Saiari 50'; Muralha (yellow card) 82'	Report		Stadium: Al-Hazem Club Stadium; Attendance: 2,900; Referee: Daniel Stefanski (Poland)

21 February 2019 21	Al-Hazem	1–1	Al-Ettifaq	Ar Rass
18:40	Al-Saiari (yellow card) 23'; Alemão 67' (pen.)	Report	El Sayed (yellow card) 42'; Al-Kwikbi (yellow card) 65'; Guanca 70' (pen.), (yellow card) 79'	Stadium: Al-Hazem Club Stadium; Attendance: 1,572; Referee: Ravshan Irmatov (Uzbekistan)

2 March 2019 22	Al-Hazem	0–1	Al-Fayha	Ar Rass
16:00	Pajoy (yellow card) 79'	Report	Al-Sobhi 52'; Kanno (yellow card) 64'; Jaafari (yellow card) 69'; Tziolis (yellow card) 78'	Stadium: Al-Hazem Club Stadium; Attendance: 1,150; Referee: Anastasios Sidiropoulos (Greece)

9 March 2019 23	Al-Hazem	2–2	Ohod	Ar Rass
16:00	Salomão 29'; Asselah (yellow card) 60'; Igboananike 72'; Rodolfo (yellow card) 90+2'	Report	Majrashi (yellow card) 41'; Medjani 58' (pen.), 84'; Al-Maghrebi (yellow card) 75'	Stadium: Al-Hazem Club Stadium; Attendance: 1,053; Referee: Matthew Conger (New Zealand)

16 March 2019 24	Al-Hazem	0–3	Al-Ittihad	Ar Rass
16:00	Bakheet (red card) 53'; Tsiskaridze (yellow card) 62'	Report	Villanueva 31'; Bajandouh (yellow card) 48'; Al-Muwallad (yellow card) 64', (goal) 90+4' da Costa 68'; El Ahmadi (yellow card) 76'	Stadium: Al-Hazem Club Stadium; Attendance: 2,292; Referee: Ovidiu Hațegan (Romania)

28 March 2019 25	Al-Hazem	1–0	Al-Fateh	Ar Rass
16:00	Igboananike 47'; Al-Rio (yellow card) 83'; Al-Dossari (yellow card) 87'	Report	Al-Fuhaid (yellow card) 36'; Al-Najar (yellow card) 90'	Stadium: Al-Hazem Club Stadium; Attendance: 1,053; Referee: João Capela (Portugal)

4 April 2019 26	Al-Hazem	2–3	Al-Hilal	Ar Rass
20:45	Rodolfo 18'; Al-Khalaf (yellow card) 29'; Tsiskaridze 45+1', (yellow card) 68'; Al-Saiari (yellow card) 63'; Bakheet (yellow card) 69'	Report	Botía (yellow card) 12'; Gomis 48', 73'; Soriano 90', (yellow card) 90+6'	Stadium: Al-Hazem Club Stadium; Attendance: 6,200; Referee: Damir Skomina (Slovenia)

11 April 2019 27	Al-Hazem	1–0	Al-Raed	Ar Rass
20:30	Al-Barakah (yellow card) 52'; Igboananike 76'; Al-Saiari (yellow card) 82'	Report	Al-Ghamdi (yellow card) 7'; Amora (yellow card) 49'	Stadium: Al-Hazem Club Stadium; Attendance: 1,086; Referee: Artur Soares Dias (Portugal)

20 April 2019 28	Al-Shabab	2–0	Al-Hazem	Riyadh
18:55	Sebá 5', 37'; Trawally (yellow card) 65'; Găman (yellow card) 81'	Report	Alemão (yellow card) 60'; Al-Khalaf (yellow card) 90+2'	Stadium: Prince Faisal bin Fahd Stadium; Attendance: 1,276; Referee: Damir Skomina (Slovenia)

11 May 2019 29	Al-Hazem	0–3	Al-Nassr	Ar Rass
22:30	Bakheet (yellow card) 51'; Muralha (yellow card) 58'	Report	Hamdallah 5' (pen.), 26', 66', (yellow card) 33'; Al-Obaid (yellow card) 35'	Stadium: Al-Hazem Club Stadium; Attendance: 6,200; Referee: Viktor Kassai (Hungary)

16 May 2019 30	Al-Qadsiah	2–2	Al-Hazem	Khobar
22:30	Fallatah (yellow card) 5'; Hazazi (yellow card) 67'; Al-Najar (yellow card) 69' (yellow-red card) 90+6'; Williams (yellow card) 79'; Bismark 80'; Al-Amri (yellow card) 84' (yellow-red card) 90+7'; Jorge Silva 87'; Al-Khabrani (yellow card) 90+5'	Report	Salomão 41'; Rodolfo 44'; Asselah (yellow card) 49' (yellow-red card) 90+9'; Al-Barakah (yellow card) 58'; Bakheet (yellow card) 66'	Stadium: Prince Saud bin Jalawi Stadium; Attendance: 500; Referee: Antonio Mateu Lahoz (Spain)

==== Relegation play-offs ====
20 May 2019 First Leg	Al-Hazem	1–0	Al-Khaleej	Ar Rass
22:30	Pajoy 20' (pen.); Al-Hamdan (yellow card) 50'	Report	Al-Nashi (yellow card) 14'; Diaby (yellow card) 18'; Al-Qeed (yellow card) 84'; Bangoura (yellow card) 90+3'	Stadium: Al-Hazem Club Stadium; Referee: Ovidiu Hațegan (Romania)

24 May 2019 Second Leg	Al-Khaleej	2–1 (a.e.t.) (2–3 p)	Al-Hazem	Saihat
22:30	Al-Sheikh (yellow card) 33'; Al-Khateeb (yellow card) 49'; Bernardo (yellow card) 53'; Diaby 64', 120+1', (yellow card) 120+1'	Report	Al-Rio (yellow card) 59'; Bakheet (yellow card) 88'; Al-Saiari 93' (pen.), (yellow card) 105+1'	Stadium: Al-Khaleej Club Stadium; Referee: Szymon Marciniak (Poland)
	Penalties
	Al-Motawaa (penalty missed); Al-Enezi (penalty scored); Al-Khateeb (penalty scored); Al-Sheikh (penalty missed); Lajami (penalty missed)		Alemão (penalty scored); Al-Saiari (penalty scored); Bakheet (penalty missed); Rodolfo (penalty scored)

=== King Cup ===
All times are local, AST (UTC+3).

2 January 2019 Round of 64	Al-Kholood	0–1	Al-Hazem	Al Bukayriyah
15:25		Report	Muralha 44'	Stadium: Al-Bukayriyah Club Stadium; Referee: Sultan Al-Harbi

17 January 2019 Round of 32	Al-Hazem	0–1	Al-Jeel	Al Bukayriyah
15:35		Report	Kadu Fernandes 52'	Stadium: Al-Bukayriyah Club Stadium; Referee: Abdulrahman Al-Shammari

== Statistics ==
=== Squad statistics ===
Last updated on 16 May 2019.

No.	Pos	Nat	Player	Total		Pro League		King Cup		Play-offs	
No.	Pos	Nat	Player	Apps	Goals	Apps	Goals	Apps	Goals	Apps	Goals
Goalkeepers
21	GK	(Saudi Arabia)	Dawod Al Saeed	2	0	0	0	1	0	1	0
22	GK	(Saudi Arabia)	Abdullah Abdulhameed	0	0	0	0	0	0	0	0
30	GK	(Algeria)	Malik Asselah	31	0	30	0	0	0	1	0
33	GK	(Saudi Arabia)	Abdulrahman Dagriri	1	0	0	0	1	0	0	0
Defenders
2	DF	(Saudi Arabia)	Abdulrahman Al-Rio	16	0	11+3	0	1	0	1	0
3	DF	(Saudi Arabia)	Khaled Al-Barakah	23	0	23	0	0	0	0	0
4	DF	(Brazil)	Alemão	33	4	29	4	2	0	2	0
12	DF	(Saudi Arabia)	Salem Al-Hamdan	4	0	1	0	2	0	1	0
20	DF	(Saudi Arabia)	Abdullah Al Harbi	1	0	0	0	1	0	0	0
23	DF	(Georgia (country))	Zurab Tsiskaridze	16	1	12+1	1	1	0	2	0
32	DF	(Saudi Arabia)	Masoud Bakheet	28	2	24+1	2	2	0	1	0
43	DF	(Saudi Arabia)	Abdulrahman Al-Dakheel	0	0	0	0	0	0	0	0
77	DF	(Saudi Arabia)	Saif Al-Qeshtah	19	0	17+1	0	0	0	0+1	0
Midfielders
7	MF	(Saudi Arabia)	Abdulwahab Jaafer	1	0	0+1	0	0	0	0	0
8	MF	(Brazil)	Rodolfo	26	5	24	5	0	0	2	0
11	MF	(Portugal)	Diogo Salomão	13	2	9+2	2	0	0	1+1	0
16	MF	(Saudi Arabia)	Ismael Musallami	7	0	4+2	0	1	0	0	0
17	MF	(Saudi Arabia)	Fares Al-Ayyaf	21	1	15+2	1	2	0	1+1	0
24	MF	(Saudi Arabia)	Maher Al Mutairi	3	0	0+1	0	0+2	0	0	0
26	MF	(Colombia)	Jhon Pajoy	33	3	27+2	2	2	0	2	1
27	MF	(Saudi Arabia)	Saeed Al-Dossari	7	0	2+4	0	0	0	0+1	0
37	MF	(Saudi Arabia)	Osama Al-Khalaf	15	1	12+1	1	0	0	2	0
71	MF	(Saudi Arabia)	Mohammed Harzan	12	0	4+5	0	2	0	0+1	0
88	MF	(Brazil)	Muralha	31	1	28	0	1	1	2	0
Forwards
10	FW	(Nigeria)	Kennedy Igboananike	15	4	4+9	4	0	0	2	0
15	FW	(Saudi Arabia)	Mojahed Al-Munee	13	0	1+11	0	1	0	0	0
70	FW	(Saudi Arabia)	Mohammed Al-Saiari	27	11	23+2	10	0	0	1+1	1
99	FW	(Saudi Arabia)	Ali Khormi	19	0	2+15	0	1+1	0	0	0
Players sent out on loan this season
11	FW	(Saudi Arabia)	Hamed Al Maqati	10	0	2+6	0	1+1	0	0	0
Player who made an appearance this season but have left the club
6	MF	(Saudi Arabia)	Tareq Al-Kaebi	3	0	1+2	0	0	0	0	0
9	MF	(Syria)	Youssef Kalfa	17	0	15+2	0	0	0	0	0
10	MF	(Ecuador)	Carlos Feraud	13	0	6+6	0	1	0	0	0
19	FW	(Bolivia)	Gilbert Álvarez	9	0	3+6	0	0	0	0	0
27	DF	(Saudi Arabia)	Salem Ali	1	0	0	0	0+1	0	0	0

=== Goalscorers ===
Rank	No.	Pos	Nat	Name	Pro League	King Cup	Play-offs	Total
1	70	FW	(Saudi Arabia)	Mohammed Al-Saiari	10	0	1	11
2	8	MF	(Brazil)	Rodolfo	5	0	0	5
3	4	DF	(Brazil)	Alemão	4	0	0	4
3	10	FW	(Nigeria)	Kennedy Igboananike	4	0	0	4
5	26	MF	(Colombia)	Jhon Pajoy	2	0	1	3
6	11	MF	(Portugal)	Diogo Salomão	2	0	0	2
6	32	DF	(Saudi Arabia)	Masoud Bakheet	2	0	0	2
8	17	MF	(Saudi Arabia)	Fares Al-Ayyaf	1	0	0	1
8	23	DF	(Georgia (country))	Zurab Tsiskaridze	1	0	0	1
8	37	MF	(Saudi Arabia)	Osama Al-Khalaf	1	0	0	1
8	88	MF	(Brazil)	Muralha	0	1	0	1
Own goal					1	0	0	1
Total					33	1	2	36

Last Updated: 24 May 2019

=== Assists ===
Rank	No.	Pos	Nat	Name	Pro League	King Cup	Play-offs	Total
1	8	MF	(Brazil)	Rodolfo	5	0	0	5
2	3	DF	(Saudi Arabia)	Khaled Al-Barakah	3	0	0	3
2	9	MF	(Syria)	Youssef Kalfa	3	0	0	3
2	11	MF	(Portugal)	Diogo Salomão	3	0	0	3
2	26	MF	(Colombia)	Jhon Pajoy	3	0	0	3
6	88	MF	(Brazil)	Muralha	2	0	0	2
7	2	DF	(Saudi Arabia)	Abdulrahman Al-Rio	1	0	0	1
7	10	MF	(Ecuador)	Carlos Feraud	1	0	0	1
7	32	DF	(Saudi Arabia)	Masoud Bakheet	1	0	0	1
Total					22	0	0	22

Last Updated: 16 May 2019

=== Clean sheets ===
Rank	No.	Pos	Nat	Name	Pro League	King Cup	Play-offs	Total
1	30	GK	(Algeria)	Malik Asselah	4	0	0	4
2	21	GK	(Saudi Arabia)	Dawod Al Saeed	0	1	1	2
Total					4	1	1	6

Last Updated: 20 May 2019
