= 2019–20 Al-Hazem F.C. season =

Al-Hazem
2019–20 season
- President: Abdullah Al-Meqhim
- Manager: Daniel Isăilă
- Stadium: Al-Hazem Club Stadium
- Pro League: 15th (relegated)
- King Cup: Round of 64
- Top goalscorer: League: Carlos Strandberg (13); All: Carlos Strandberg (14)
- Highest home attendance: 5,400 (vs. Al-Hilal, 26 December 2019)
- Lowest home attendance: 3,125 (vs. Al-Shabab, 10 January 2020)
- Average home league attendance: 3,782
Home colours	Away colours	Third colours
- All statistics correct as of 9 September 2020.

The 2019–20 season was Al-Hazem's 8th non-consecutive season in the Pro League and their 63rd season in existence. The club participated in the Pro League and the King Cup.

The season covered the period from 1 July 2019 to 9 September 2020.

== Players ==
=== Squad information ===
As of 1 February 2020

Note: Flags indicate national team as defined under FIFA eligibility rules; some limited exceptions apply. Players may hold more than one non-FIFA nationality.

No.	Pos.	Nation	Player
1	GK	KSA	Dawod Al Saeed
2	DF	KSA	Sultan Faqihi
3	FW	KSA	Abdulrahman Al-Yami
4	DF	BRA	Alemão
6	DF	KSA	Omar Mohammed
7	DF	KSA	Wesam Al-Sowayed
11	MF	KSA	Abdulaziz Al-Nashi
12	MF	KSA	Ghallab Al-Enezi
13	DF	KSA	Mohammed Al-Zubaidi (on loan from Al-Ahli)
15	MF	KSA	Mansor Hamzi
16	DF	KSA	Naif Al-Mousa
17	MF	KSA	Fares Al-Ayyaf
18	MF	KSA	Abdulaziz Majrashi (on loan from Al-Ettifaq)
19	MF	BRA	Jonathan Cafú
20	FW	NIG	Yousef Mohammed Omar

No.	Pos.	Nation	Player
22	GK	KSA	Abdullah Abdulhameed
23	MF	KSA	Hassan Al-Habib
25	MF	KSA	Nawaf Al-Farshan (on loan from Al-Nassr)
28	DF	KSA	Abdullah Al-Shammari
30	GK	ALG	Malik Asselah
32	DF	KSA	Masoud Bakheet
33	MF	MAR	Driss Fettouhi
37	MF	KSA	Osama Al-Khalaf
41	GK	KSA	Majed Al-Ghamdi
70	DF	KSA	Ahmed Al-Shamrani
74	MF	FRA	Karim Yoda
77	DF	KSA	Saif Al-Qeshtah
88	MF	BRA	Muralha
99	FW	SWE	Carlos Strandberg (on loan from Malmö FF)

=== Out on loan ===
Note: Flags indicate national team as defined under FIFA eligibility rules; some limited exceptions apply. Players may hold more than one non-FIFA nationality.

No.	Pos.	Nation	Player
8	FW	KSA	Hamed Al Maqati (at Al-Ain until 30 June 2020)
10	MF	MLI	Ibrahima Tandia (at CS Sfaxien until 30 June 2020)
14	FW	KSA	Hammad Al-Shaya (at Al-Bukayriyah until 30 June 2020)

No.	Pos.	Nation	Player
24	MF	KSA	Maher Al Mutairi (at Al-Taqadom until 30 June 2020)
27	FW	KSA	Khaled Al-Lazzam (at Al-Mujazzal until 30 June 2020)
43	DF	KSA	Abdulrahman Al-Dakheel (at Al-Taqadom until 30 June 2020)

== Transfers and loans ==
=== Transfers in ===
Entry date	Position	No.	Player	From club	Fee	Ref.
1 June 2019	FW	20	(Niger) Yousef Mohammed Omar	(Saudi Arabia) Al-Jeel	Undisclosed	
2 June 2019	MF	11	(Saudi Arabia) Abdulaziz Al-Nashi	(Saudi Arabia) Al-Khaleej	Free	
8 June 2019	DF	70	(Saudi Arabia) Ahmed Al-Shamrani	(Saudi Arabia) Al-Wehda	Free	
3 July 2019	MF	10	(Mali) Ibrahima Tandia	(Romania) Sepsi	$675,000	
4 July 2019	MF	33	(Morocco) Driss Fettouhi	(United Arab Emirates) Dibba Al-Fujairah	Free	
9 July 2019	DF	16	(Saudi Arabia) Naif Al-Mousa	(Saudi Arabia) Al-Taawoun	Free	
10 July 2019	DF	6	(Saudi Arabia) Omar Mohammed	(Saudi Arabia) Ohod	Free	
12 July 2019	DF	7	(Saudi Arabia) Wesam Al-Sowayed	(Saudi Arabia) Al-Faisaly	Free	
15 July 2019	MF	23	(Saudi Arabia) Hassan Al-Habib	(Saudi Arabia) Al-Ettifaq	Undisclosed	
17 July 2019	MF	15	(Saudi Arabia) Mansor Hamzi	(Saudi Arabia) Al-Fateh	Undisclosed	
19 July 2019	FW	3	(Saudi Arabia) Abdulrahman Al-Yami	(Saudi Arabia) Al-Hilal	Undisclosed	
4 August 2019	FW	27	(Saudi Arabia) Khaled Al-Lazzam	(Tunisia) Bizertin	Free	
6 August 2019	MF	9	(Ghana) Ernest Asante	(United Arab Emirates) Al Jazira	Free	
8 August 2019	MF	12	(Saudi Arabia) Ghallab Al-Enezi	(Saudi Arabia) Al-Shabab	Free	
9 August 2019	DF	28	(Saudi Arabia) Abdullah Al-Shammari	(Saudi Arabia) Al-Wehda	Free	
17 August 2019	GK	41	(Saudi Arabia) Majed Al-Ghamdi	(Saudi Arabia) Al-Ahli	Free	
27 August 2019	MF	37	(Saudi Arabia) Osama Al-Khalaf	(Saudi Arabia) Al-Ettifaq	Undisclosed	
23 January 2020	MF	74	(France) Karim Yoda	(Spain) Racing Santander	$1,100,000	
27 January 2020	MF	19	(Brazil) Jonathan Cafú	(France) Bordeaux	Free	
31 January 2020	DF	2	(Saudi Arabia) Sultan Faqihi	(Saudi Arabia) Al-Nahda	Free	

=== Loans in ===
Start date	End date	Position	No.	Player	From club	Fee	Ref.
8 July 2019	End of season	MF	18	(Saudi Arabia) Abdulaziz Majrashi	(Saudi Arabia) Al-Ettifaq	None	
9 July 2019	End of season	DF	13	(Saudi Arabia) Mohammed Al-Zubaidi	(Saudi Arabia) Al-Ahli	None	
30 August 2019	End of season	FW	99	(Sweden) Carlos Strandberg	(Sweden) Malmö FF	None	
31 January 2020	End of season	MF	25	(Saudi Arabia) Nawaf Al-Farshan	(Saudi Arabia) Al-Nassr	None	

=== Transfers out ===
Exit date	Position	No.	Player	To club	Fee	Ref.
29 May 2019	MF	11	(Portugal) Diogo Salomão		Released	
29 May 2019	MF	26	(Colombia) Jhon Pajoy		Released	
29 May 2019	FW	10	(Nigeria) Kennedy Igboananike		Released	
31 May 2019	DF	4	(Saudi Arabia) Khaled Al-Barakah	(Saudi Arabia) Al-Ahli	$1,100,000	
25 June 2019	MF	8	(Brazil) Rodolfo	(Brazil) São Bento	Free	
2 July 2019	MF	99	(Saudi Arabia) Ali Khormi	(Saudi Arabia) Al-Ain	Free	
4 July 2019	MF	27	(Saudi Arabia) Saeed Al-Dossari	(Saudi Arabia) Al-Fateh	Free	
6 July 2019	MF	16	(Saudi Arabia) Ismael Musallami	(Saudi Arabia) Al-Ain	Free	
13 July 2019	DF	12	(Saudi Arabia) Salem Al-Hamdan	(Saudi Arabia) Al-Qadsiah	Free	
20 July 2019	DF	20	(Saudi Arabia) Abdullah Al-Harbi	(Saudi Arabia) Al-Khaleej	Free	
26 July 2019	DF	23	(Georgia (country)) Zurab Tsiskaridze	(Saudi Arabia) Al-Jabalain	Free	
28 July 2019	MF	7	(Saudi Arabia) Abdulwahab Jaafer	(Saudi Arabia) Damac	Undisclosed	
23 August 2019	GK	33	(Saudi Arabia) Abdulrahman Dagriri	(Saudi Arabia) Hetten	Free	
16 January 2020	MF	9	(Ghana) Ernest Asante	(United Arab Emirates) Al-Fujairah	Undisclosed	

=== Loans out ===
Start date	End date	Position	No.	Player	To club	Fee	Ref.
17 August 2019	End of season	FW	27	(Saudi Arabia) Khaled Al-Lazzam	(Saudi Arabia) Al-Mujazzal	None	
17 August 2019	End of season	DF	43	(Saudi Arabia) Abdulrahman Al-Dakheel	(Saudi Arabia) Al-Taqadom	None	
31 August 2019	End of season	FW	8	(Saudi Arabia) Hamed Al Maqati	(Saudi Arabia) Al-Ain	None	
18 January 2020	End of season	MF	24	(Saudi Arabia) Maher Al Mutairi	(Saudi Arabia) Al-Taqadom	None	
28 January 2020	End of season	MF	10	(Mali) Ibrahima Tandia	(Tunisia) CS Sfaxien	None	
31 January 2020	End of season	MF	14	(Saudi Arabia) Hamaad Al-Shaye	(Saudi Arabia) Al-Bukayriyah	None	

== Pre-season ==
26 July 2019 Friendly	Al-Hazem (Saudi Arabia)	0–3	(Algeria) Paradou AC	Bakovci, Slovenia
17:00 CEST		Report	Bouchina 14'; Herrari 35'; Elardja 60'	Stadium: SRC Bakovci Stadium

28 July 2019 Friendly	Al-Hazem (Saudi Arabia)	1–1	(Hungary) Siófok	Bakovci, Slovenia
18:30 CEST	Al-Mousa 5'	Report	Lorentz 14'	Stadium: SRC Bakovci Stadium

2 August 2019 Friendly	Al-Hazem (Saudi Arabia)	1–0	(Saudi Arabia) Al-Fateh	Limbuš, Slovenia
18:00 CEST	Tandia 74'	Report		Stadium: Sport Park Limbus

6 August 2019 Friendly	Al-Hazem (Saudi Arabia)	6–1	(Slovenia) Šampion	Dobrava, Slovenia
18:00 CEST	Al-Ayyaf 33'; Al-Yami 61'; Alemão 66'; Fettouhi 73', 90+7'; Al-Mutairi 90+5'	Report	5'

== Competitions ==
=== Overall ===
Competition	Started round	Final position / round	First match	Last match
Pro League	—	15th	23 August 2019	9 September 2020
King Cup	Round of 64	Round of 64	6 November 2019	

Updated to match played 9 September 2020
Source: Competitions

=== Overview ===
Competition	Record							
Competition	G	W	D	L	GF	GA	GD	Win %
Pro League	30	7	6	17	40	61	−21	23.33
King Cup	1	0	0	1	2	3	−1	0.00
Total	31	7	6	18	42	64	−22	22.58

Updated to match played 9 September 2020
Source: Competitions

=== Pro League ===
==== League table ====
Pos	Team	Pld	W	D	L	GF	GA	GD	Pts	Qualification or relegation
12	Al-Taawoun	30	10	5	15	33	40	−7	35 (Note: Positions determined by head-to-head points: Damac: 9 pts; Al-Ittihad: 6 pts; Al-Taawoun: 3 pts.)	
13	Al-Fateh	30	8	9	13	42	49	−7	33	
14	Al-Fayha (R)	30	8	8	14	34	44	−10	32	Relegation to Prince Mohammad bin Salman League
15	Al-Hazem (R)	30	7	6	17	40	61	−21	27	Relegation to Prince Mohammad bin Salman League
16	Al-Adalah (R)	30	4	9	17	27	62	−35	21	Relegation to Prince Mohammad bin Salman League

Updated to match(es) played on 9 September 2020. Source: spl.com
Rules for classification: 1) Points; 2) Head-to-head points; 3) Head-to-head goal difference; 4) Total goal difference; 5) Total goals scored; 6) Fair-play points (Note: Head-to-head record is used only after all the matches between the teams in question have been played).
(R) Relegated

==== Results summary ====
Overall								Home						Away					
Pld	W	D	L	GF	GA	GD	Pts	W	D	L	GF	GA	GD	W	D	L	GF	GA	GD
30	7	6	17	40	61	−21	27	3	4	8	22	30	−8	4	2	9	18	31	−13

Last updated: 9 September 2020.

==== Results by round ====
Round	1	2	3	4	5	6	7	8	9	10	11	12	13	14	15	16	17	18	19	20	21	22	23	24	25	26	27	28	29	30
Ground	A	A	H	A	H	A	A	H	A	H	H	A	H	H	A	H	H	A	H	A	H	H	A	H	A	A	H	A	A	H
Result	D	L	L	W	W	W	L	W	D	L	L	L	D	L	L	D	W	W	L	L	D	D	L	L	L	W	L	L	L	L
Position	8	12	15	13	8	5	7	7	7	8	10	11	12	12	13	13	13	10	12	13	13	12	12	12	14	13	15	15	15	15

Updated to match(es) played on 9 September 2020. Source:
A = Away; H = Home; W = Win; D = Draw; L = Loss

==== Matches ====
All times are local, AST (UTC+3).

Win Draw Loss Postponed

23 August 2019 1	Al-Taawoun	1–1	Al-Hazem	Buraidah
19:10	Amissi (yellow card) 23'; Héldon 45+4'; Sandro Manoel (yellow card) 45+6'	Report	Bakheet (yellow card) 9' (yellow-red card) 62'; Muralha (yellow card) 25'; Barnawi 34' (o.g.); Al-Mousa (yellow card) 81'	Stadium: King Abdullah Sport City Stadium; Attendance: 2,129; Referee: Luís Godinho (Portugal)

29 August 2019 2	Al-Fayha	2–1	Al-Hazem	Al Majma'ah
20:20	Al-Muziel (yellow card) 38'; Al-Qahtani (yellow card) 45+1', (goal) 45+5'; Fernández (yellow card) 52', (goal) 90'; Al-Khaibari (yellow card) 78'	Report	Al-Yami (yellow card) 18', (goal) 43'; Hamzi (yellow card) 82'; Al-Shammari (yellow card) 86'	Stadium: Al Majma'ah Sports City; Attendance: 5,752; Referee: Damir Skomina (Slovenia)

15 September 2019 3	Al-Hazem	0–6	Al-Ettifaq	Ar Rass
18:50		Report	Kiss 14' (pen.); Bakheet 19' (o.g.); Yambéré (yellow card) 27'; Doukara 38' (pen.), 89'; Al-Ghamdi 58'; Rogerinho 66'	Stadium: Al-Hazem Club Stadium; Attendance: 4,050; Referee: Bas Nijhuis (Netherlands)

20 September 2019 4	Al-Nassr	0–1	Al-Hazem	Riyadh
20:20	Al-Obaid (yellow card) 69'; Ali (yellow card) 80'	Report	Strandberg 14'; Al-Habib (yellow card) 45+3'; Muralha (yellow card) 45+5'; Alemão (yellow card) 87'	Stadium: King Fahd International Stadium; Attendance: 11,017; Referee: Svein Oddvar Moen (Norway)

28 September 2019 5	Al-Hazem	4–0	Damac	Ar Rass
18:35	Strandberg 4', 69', (yellow card) 74'; Al-Habib 38'; Al-Ayyaf (yellow card) 54'; Omar 78'	Report	Al-Dossari (yellow card) 50'	Stadium: Al-Hazem Club Stadium; Attendance: 4,603; Referee: Krzysztof Jakubik (Poland)

4 October 2019 6	Al-Ittihad	1–2	Al-Hazem	Jeddah
20:10	Camara 6', (yellow card) 82'	Report	Al-Sowayed (yellow card) 10'; Alemão 45+3'; Fettouhi 83'; Asante (yellow card) 90+7'	Stadium: King Abdullah Sports City; Attendance: 20,244; Referee: Martin Pérez (Netherlands)

20 October 2019 7	Al-Faisaly	1–0	Al-Hazem	Al Majma'ah
20:00	Al-Ghamdi 58', (yellow card) 67'; Solan (yellow card) 90+4'	Report	Al-Ayyaf (yellow card) 47'	Stadium: Al Majma'ah Sports City; Attendance: 4,506; Referee: Fábio Veríssimo (Portugal)

26 October 2019 8	Al-Hazem	2–1	Al-Ahli	Ar Rass
18:10	Fettouhi (yellow card) 34'; Al-Zubaidi (yellow card) 42'; Muralha (red card) 45+3'; Tandia 50'; Hamzi 87'	Report	Lucas Lima (yellow card) 34'; Belaïli (yellow card) 41'; Asiri (yellow card) 60'; Hindi 70'; Al-Mowalad (yellow card) 90+4'	Stadium: Al-Hazem Club Stadium; Attendance: 3,391; Referee: Ivan Bebek (Croatia)

2 November 2019 9	Al-Adalah	2–2	Al-Hazem	Al-Hasa
17:40	Cissé (yellow card) 27'; Andriamatsinoro 59', 71'; Al-Radhi (yellow card) 64'; Al-Dawsari (yellow card) 85'	Report	Al-Nashi (yellow card) 18'; Tandia 22', (yellow card) 44'; Al-Habib (yellow card) 66'; Al-Khalaf (yellow card) 78'; Al-Zubaidi 90+3'	Stadium: Prince Abdullah bin Jalawi Stadium; Attendance: 8,134; Referee: Igor Pajac (Croatia)

22 November 2019 10	Al-Hazem	2–3	Al-Raed	Ar Rass
17:55	Muralha (yellow card) 18'; Al-Khalaf 67'; Strandberg 74'; Al-Zubaidi (yellow card) 90+1'; Al-Qeshtah (yellow card) 90+4'	Report	Fouzair 21'; Djoum 42'; Al-Zain 56'; Doukha (yellow card) 73'; Al-Ghamdi (yellow card) 90'; Al-Sawadi (yellow card) 90+4'	Stadium: Al-Hazem Club Stadium; Attendance: 3,328; Referee: Jorge Sousa (Portugal)

12 December 2019 11	Al-Hazem	2–3	Abha	Ar Rass
15:20	Strandberg 6'; Fettouhi 71' (pen.); Al-Nashi (yellow card) 90'	Report	Alemão 29' (o.g.); Andriatsima 38'; Aouadhi 52'; Al-Nabit (yellow card) 68'	Stadium: Al-Hazem Club Stadium; Attendance: 4,431; Referee: Svein Oddvar Moen (Norway)

20 December 2019 12	Al-Fateh	2–1	Al-Hazem	Al-Hasa
17:35	Saâdane 11' (pen.); Majrashi (yellow card) 13' te Vrede 86'; Pinto (yellow card) 90+3'	Report	Strandberg 2'; Fettouhi (yellow card) 36'; Muralha (yellow card) 67'	Stadium: Prince Abdullah bin Jalawi Stadium; Attendance: 2,007; Referee: Viktor Kassai (Hungary)

26 December 2019 13	Al-Hazem	1–1	Al-Hilal	Ar Rass
19:50	Hamzi 53'; Asselah (yellow card) 84'	Report	Giovinco 90+1'	Stadium: Al-Hazem Club Stadium; Attendance: 5,400; Referee: Shukri Al-Hanfoush

10 January 2020 14	Al-Hazem	0–1	Al-Shabab	Ar Rass
15:35	Al-Khalaf (yellow card) 90+1'	Report	N'Diaye (yellow card) 17'; Diop 56'; Al-Shamekh (yellow card) 79'	Stadium: Al-Hazem Club Stadium; Attendance: 3,125; Referee: Szymon Marciniak (Poland)

24 January 2020 15	Al-Wehda	5–1	Al-Hazem	Mecca
20:10	Al-Sqoor 6'; Renato (yellow card) 26', (goal) 34'; Al-Zori (yellow card) 54'; Niakaté 60'; Anselmo 73'; Luisinho 88'	Report	Al-Ayyaf (yellow card) 33'; Al-Shammari (yellow card) 66'; Omar 77'	Stadium: King Abdul Aziz Stadium; Attendance: 10,141; Referee: Majed Al-Shamrani

31 January 2020 16	Al-Hazem	0–0	Al-Taawoun	Ar Rass
18:25	Al-Khalaf (yellow card) 14'	Report	Abousaban (yellow card) 12'; Darwish (yellow card) 45+3'	Stadium: Al-Hazem Club Stadium; Attendance: 3,224; Referee: Khaled Al-Teris

7 February 2020 17	Al-Hazem	4–2	Al-Fayha	Ar Rass
18:30	Strandberg 10'; Cafú 24', (yellow card) 62'; Alemão 34'; Fettouhi 51'; Muralha (yellow card) 71'	Report	Al-Juhaim 39', (yellow card) 43'; Owusu 65'; Al-Sobhi (yellow card) 69'; Al-Qahtani (yellow card) 90+3'	Stadium: Al-Hazem Club Stadium; Attendance: 3,312; Referee: Anastasios Sidiropoulos (Greece)

13 February 2020 18	Al-Ettifaq	2–3	Al-Hazem	Dammam
15:30	Al-Torais (yellow card) 42'; Al-Selouli 51'; Al-Kwikbi 65'	Report	Strandberg (yellow card) 31', (goal) 45+3', 59'; Yoda 49'	Stadium: Prince Mohamed bin Fahd Stadium; Attendance: 1,704; Referee: Matej Jug (Slovenia)

22 February 2020 19	Al-Hazem	0–2	Al-Nassr	Ar Rass
18:40	Al-Zubaidi (yellow card) 43'	Report	Al-Amri 54'; Al-Shehri 88'	Stadium: Al-Hazem Club Stadium; Attendance: 3,435; Referee: Jorge Sousa (Portugal)

28 February 2020 20	Damac	3–0	Al-Hazem	Abha
18:10	Saidani (yellow card) 25'; Chafaï 78'; Zelaya 87', 90+2' (pen.)	Report	Alemão (yellow card) 80'	Stadium: Prince Sultan bin Abdul Aziz Stadium; Attendance: 1,533; Referee: Mohammed Al-Hoaish

5 March 2020 21	Al-Hazem	1–1	Al-Ittihad	Ar Rass
18:45	Al-Nashi (yellow card) 21'; Al-Zubaidi (yellow card) 48'; Cafú (yellow card) 63'; Alemão 90'	Report	Al-Malki (yellow card) 55'; Bony 61' (pen.)	Stadium: Al-Hazem Club Stadium; Attendance: 3,306; Referee: Bobby Madden (Scotland)

12 March 2020 22	Al-Hazem	2–2	Al-Faisaly	Ar Rass
20:40	Alemão 34' (pen.); Al-Khalaf 49'; Al-Qeshtah (yellow card) 55'	Report	Al-Ghamdi (yellow card) 32'; Qassem (yellow card) 40'; El Jebli 44'; Al-Saiari 68'; Bonevacia (yellow card) 82'	Stadium: Al-Hazem Club Stadium; Attendance: 0 (Note: Matches from 7 March and onwards will be played behind closed doors due to concerns over the coronavirus outbreak.); Referee: István Kovács (Romania)

4 August 2020 23	Al-Ahli	4–2	Al-Hazem	Jeddah
21:15	Ghareeb 3'; Lucas Lima (yellow card) 22'; Al Somah 50'; H. Asiri 86', (yellow card) 86' (yellow-red card) 90+2'; Al-Harbi 88'	Report	Al-Qeshtah (yellow card) 57'; Strandberg 65'; Cafú 68', (yellow card) 90+1'	Stadium: King Abdullah Sports City; Attendance: 0 Referee: Shukri Al-Hanfoush

10 August 2020 24	Al-Hazem	1–2	Al-Adalah	Ar Rass
19:20	Strandberg 24'; Fettouhi (yellow card) 27'; Al-Shammari (yellow card) 67'	Report	Khrees (yellow card) 45+1'; Andriamatsinoro 64'; Gentsoglou (yellow card) 73'; Sharahili 75'	Stadium: Al-Hazem Club Stadium; Attendance: 0 Referee: Kristo Tohver (Estonia)

14 August 2020 25	Al-Raed	3–1	Al-Hazem	Buraidah
19:15	Al-Hussain 25' (pen.); Al-Mogren (yellow card) 72'; Fouzair 77' (pen.), 87'	Report	Alemão (yellow card) 8', (goal) 68' (pen.); Al-Shammari (yellow card) 41'; Al-Zubaidi (yellow card) 81'; Al-Khalaf (yellow card) 84'	Stadium: King Abdullah Sport City Stadium; Attendance: 0 Referee: Tamás Bognár (Hungary)

19 August 2020 26	Abha	0–2	Al-Hazem	Abha
19:10	Aouadhi (yellow card) 42'; Al-Sharari (yellow card) 45+4'; Amr (yellow card) 57'; Al-Qeed (yellow card) 65'; Al-Najar (yellow card) 89' (yellow-red card) 90+6'	Report	Strandberg 23'; Alemão (yellow card) 27', (goal) 45+5' (pen.); Asselah (yellow card) 80'	Stadium: Prince Sultan bin Abdul Aziz Stadium; Attendance: 0 Referee: Gediminas Mažeika (Lithuania)

24 August 2020 27	Al-Hazem	3–4	Al-Fateh	Ar Rass
19:10	Strandberg 40' (pen.); Al-Khalaf 59' (pen.); Al-Yami 90+1'	Report	Bendebka 18'; Saâdane (yellow card) 39' te Vrede 49', (yellow card) 70'; Kadrii 51'; Al-Hassan 80'; Al-Zaqaan (yellow card) 90+3'	Stadium: Al-Hazem Club Stadium; Attendance: 0 Referee: Aleksei Kulbakov (Belarus)

29 August 2020 28	Al-Hilal	4–1	Al-Hazem	Riyadh
20:40	Al-Dawsari 8'; Gomis 40' (pen.), 53', 56' (pen.); Giovinco (yellow card) 45+3'; Al-Shahrani (yellow card) 59'	Report	Al-Yami 3'; Asselah (yellow card) 37'	Stadium: King Saud University Stadium; Attendance: 0 Referee: Andris Treimanis (Latvia)

4 September 2020 29	Al-Shabab	1–0	Al-Hazem	Riyadh
20:35	Sharahili (yellow card) 21'; Muath (yellow card) 29'; Asprilla (yellow card) 38'; Guanca 46', (yellow card) 65'; Salem (yellow card) 67'; Al-Zori (yellow card) 90+4'	Report	Al-Mousa (yellow card) 25'	Stadium: Prince Faisal bin Fahd Stadium; Attendance: 0 Referee: João Pinheiro (Portugal)

9 September 2020 30	Al-Hazem	0–2	Al-Wehda	Ar Rass
20:35	Cafú (yellow card) 79'	Report	Niakaté 6', (yellow card) 26'; Botía (yellow card) 36'; Goodwin (yellow card) 50'; Luisinho 90+3'	Stadium: Al-Hazem Club Stadium; Attendance: 0 Referee: Ivan Bebek (Croatia)

=== King Cup ===
All times are local, AST (UTC+3).

6 November 2019 Round of 64	Al-Hazem	2–3 (a.e.t.)	Al-Dera'a	Al Bukayriyah
15:30	Tandia 56'; Strandberg 90+5'; Al-Khalaf (yellow card) 112'	Report	Al-Kanani 6'; Al-Harthi 53'; Hawsawi (yellow card) 83'; Gloulou (yellow card) 102'; Bakheet 104' (o.g.)	Stadium: Al-Bukayriyah Club Stadium; Referee: Khaled Salwi

== Statistics ==
=== Appearances ===
Last updated on 9 September 2020.

No.	Pos	Nat	Player	Total		Pro League		King Cup	
No.	Pos	Nat	Player	Apps	Goals	Apps	Goals	Apps	Goals
Goalkeepers
1	GK	(Saudi Arabia) KSA	Dawod Al Saeed	2	0	1	0	1	0
30	GK	(Algeria) ALG	Malik Asselah	29	0	29	0	0	0
41	GK	(Saudi Arabia) KSA	Majed Al-Ghamdi	0	0	0	0	0	0
Defenders
2	DF	(Saudi Arabia) KSA	Sultan Faqihi	3	0	3	0	0	0
4	DF	(Brazil) BRA	Alemão	29	6	29	6	0	0
6	DF	(Saudi Arabia) KSA	Omar Mohammed	1	0	0	0	1	0
7	DF	(Saudi Arabia) KSA	Wesam Al-Sowayed	11	0	5+6	0	0	0
13	DF	(Saudi Arabia) KSA	Mohammed Al-Zubaidi	14	1	12+2	1	0	0
16	DF	(Saudi Arabia) KSA	Naif Al-Mousa	16	0	13+2	0	1	0
28	DF	(Saudi Arabia) KSA	Abdullah Al-Shammari	17	0	15+2	0	0	0
32	DF	(Saudi Arabia) KSA	Masoud Bakheet	3	0	2	0	1	0
70	DF	(Saudi Arabia) KSA	Ahmed Al-Shamrani	9	0	6+2	0	1	0
77	DF	(Saudi Arabia) KSA	Saif Al-Qeshtah	20	0	17+3	0	0	0
Midfielders
11	MF	(Saudi Arabia) KSA	Abdulaziz Al-Nashi	22	0	20+2	0	0	0
12	MF	(Saudi Arabia) KSA	Ghallab Al-Enezi	3	0	0+2	0	1	0
15	MF	(Saudi Arabia) KSA	Mansor Hamzi	26	2	11+15	2	0	0
17	MF	(Saudi Arabia) KSA	Fares Al-Ayyaf	10	0	8+2	0	0	0
18	MF	(Saudi Arabia) KSA	Abdulaziz Majrashi	7	0	4+2	0	1	0
19	MF	(Brazil) BRA	Jonathan Cafú	15	2	13+2	2	0	0
23	MF	(Saudi Arabia) KSA	Hassan Al-Habib	19	1	11+8	1	0	0
25	MF	(Saudi Arabia) KSA	Nawaf Al-Farshan	0	0	0	0	0	0
33	MF	(Morocco) MAR	Driss Fettouhi	31	3	29+1	3	0+1	0
37	MF	(Saudi Arabia) KSA	Osama Al-Khalaf	27	3	23+3	3	0+1	0
74	MF	(France) FRA	Karim Yoda	14	1	9+5	1	0	0
88	MF	(Brazil) BRA	Muralha	27	0	26	0	1	0
Forwards
3	FW	(Saudi Arabia) KSA	Abdulrahman Al-Yami	9	3	4+5	3	0	0
20	FW	(Niger) NIG	Yousef Mohammed Omar	23	2	5+17	2	1	0
99	FW	(Sweden) SWE	Carlos Strandberg	28	14	25+2	13	0+1	1
Players sent out on loan this season
10	MF	(Mali) MLI	Ibrahima Tandia	13	3	9+3	2	0+1	1
14	MF	(Saudi Arabia) KSA	Hammad Al-Shaye	0	0	0	0	0	0
24	MF	(Saudi Arabia) KSA	Maher Al Mutairi	1	0	0	0	1	0
Player who made an appearance this season but have left the club
9	MF	(Ghana) GHA	Ernest Asante	10	0	6+3	0	1	0

=== Goalscorers ===
Rank	No.	Pos	Nat	Name	Pro League	King Cup	Total
1	99	FW	(Sweden)	Carlos Strandberg	13	1	14
2	4	DF	(Brazil)	Alemão	6	0	6
3	3	FW	(Saudi Arabia)	Abdulrahman Al-Yami	3	0	3
3	10	MF	(Mali)	Ibrahima Tandia	2	1	3
3	33	MF	(Morocco)	Driss Fettouhi	3	0	3
3	37	MF	(Saudi Arabia)	Osama Al-Khalaf	3	0	3
7	15	MF	(Saudi Arabia)	Mansor Hamzi	2	0	2
7	19	MF	(Brazil)	Jonathan Cafú	2	0	2
7	20	FW	(Niger)	Yousef Omar	2	0	2
9	13	DF	(Saudi Arabia)	Mohammed Al-Zubaidi	1	0	1
9	23	MF	(Saudi Arabia)	Hassan Al-Habib	1	0	1
9	74	MF	(France)	Karim Yoda	1	0	1
Own goal					1	0	1
Total					39	2	41

Last Updated: 4 September 2020

=== Clean sheets ===
Rank	No.	Pos	Nat	Name	Pro League	King Cup	Total
1	30	GK	(Algeria)	Malik Asselah	4	0	4
Total					4	0	4

Last Updated: 19 August 2020
