= 2018–19 Al-Hilal FC season =

Al-Hilal
2018–19 season
- President: Mohammed bin Faisal (until 1 May); Abdullah Al-Jarbo'o (from 1 May)
- Manager: Jorge Jesus (until 30 January); Zoran Mamić (from 30 January until 27 April); Péricles Chamusca (from 27 April)
- Stadium: King Saud University Stadium; Faisal bin Fahd Stadium
- SPL: 2nd
- Super Cup: Winners
- King Cup: Semi-finals (knocked out by Al-Taawoun)
- Champions League: Round of 16
- Sheikh Zayed Cup: Runners-up (knocked out by Étoile du Sahel)
- Saudi-Egyptian Super Cup: Runners-up (knocked out by Zamalek)
- Top goalscorer: League: Bafétimbi Gomis (21); All: Bafétimbi Gomis (37)
- Highest home attendance: 23,047 vs Al-Nassr (8 December 2018)
- Lowest home attendance: 10,000 vs Al-Shabab (16 May 2019)
- Average home league attendance: 19,551
Home colours	Away colours	Third colours
- All statistics correct as of 20 May 2019.

The 2018–19 season was Al-Hilal's 43rd consecutive season in the top flight of Saudi football and 61st year in existence as a football club. Along with the Pro League, the club competed in the Saudi Super Cup, the King Cup, Arab Club Champions Cup, the Saudi-Egyptian Super Cup and the Champions League. The season covers the period from 1 July 2018 to 30 June 2019.

== Squad information ==
Players and squad numbers last updated on 23 August 2018.
Note: Flags indicate national team as has been defined under FIFA eligibility rules. Players may hold more than one non-FIFA nationality.

No.	Name	Nat.	Position(s)	Date of Birth (Age)	Signed in	Contract until	Signed from	Transfer Fee	Notes
Goalkeepers
1	Abdullah Al-Mayouf	(Saudi Arabia)	GK	23 January 1987 (age 39)	2016	2020	(Saudi Arabia) Al-Ahli	Free	
23	Marwan Al-Haidari	(Saudi Arabia)	GK	12 April 1996 (age 30)	2016	2020	(Saudi Arabia) Al-Nahda	€0.3M	
26	Ali Al-Habsi	(Oman)	GK	30 December 1981 (age 44)	2017	2020	(England) Reading	€0.3M	
30	Mohammed Al-Waked	(Saudi Arabia)	GK	25 March 1992 (age 34)	2013		Youth system	N/A	
Defenders
2	Mohammed Al-Breik	(Saudi Arabia)	RB / RWB	15 September 1992 (age 34)	2014	2022	Youth system	N/A	
4	Alberto Botía	(Spain)	CB	27 January 1989 (age 37)	2018	2020	(Greece) Olympiacos	Free	
5	Ali Al Bulaihi	(Saudi Arabia)	CB	21 November 1989 (age 36)	2017	2020	(Saudi Arabia) Al-Fateh	€0.9M	
12	Yasser Al-Shahrani	(Saudi Arabia)	LB / RB	22 May 1992 (age 34)	2012	2021	(Saudi Arabia) Al-Qadsiah	€3.5M	
13	Hassan Kadesh	(Saudi Arabia)	LB	6 September 1992 (age 34)	2017	2021	(Saudi Arabia) Al-Ettifaq	€1.2M	
33	Ahmed Sharahili	(Saudi Arabia)	CB / RB	8 May 1994 (age 32)	2013	2021	Youth system	N/A	
70	Mohammed Jahfali	(Saudi Arabia)	CB	24 October 1990 (age 36)	2015	2020	(Saudi Arabia) Al-Faisaly	€1.8M	
Midfielders
3	Carlos Eduardo	(Brazil)	AM / CF / CM	17 October 1989 (age 37)	2015	2020	(Portugal) Porto	€7M	
6	Abdulmalek Al-Khaibri	(Saudi Arabia)	DM / CM	13 March 1986 (age 40)	2016	2019	(Saudi Arabia) Al-Shabab	Free	
7	Salman Al-Faraj	(Saudi Arabia)	AM / LW	1 August 1989 (age 37)	2008	2021	Youth system	N/A	Captain
8	Abdullah Otayf	(Saudi Arabia)	DM / CM	3 August 1992 (age 34)	2013	2021	(Portugal) Louletano	€2.3M	
10	Mohammad Al-Shalhoub	(Saudi Arabia)	CM / DM	8 December 1980 (age 45)	1998	2019	Youth system	N/A	
15	Ahmed Ashraf	(Saudi Arabia)	RM / AM	31 December 1992 (age 33)	2018	2021	(Saudi Arabia) Shalhoub United	Free	
16	Nasser Al-Dawsari	(Saudi Arabia)	CM / AM	19 December 1998 (age 27)	2017		Youth system	N/A	
19	André Carrillo	(Peru)	RM	14 June 1991 (age 35)	2018	2019	(Portugal) Benfica	€4M	On loan from Benfica
21	Omar Abdulrahman	(United Arab Emirates)	AM	14 June 1991 (age 35)	2018	2019	(United Arab Emirates) Al-Ain	Vice-captain	€14M
24	Nawaf Al-Abed	(Saudi Arabia)	LM / RM	26 January 1990 (age 36)	2008	2021	Youth system	N/A	
27	Hattan Bahebri	(Saudi Arabia)	LM / RM / CF	16 July 1992 (age 34)	2019	2022	(Saudi Arabia) Al-Shabab	€3.5M	
28	Mohamed Kanno	(Saudi Arabia)	CM / DM / AM	6 September 1992 (age 34)	2017	2022	(Saudi Arabia) Al-Ettifaq	€0.7M	
29	Salem Al-Dawsari	(Saudi Arabia)	LM / RM	19 August 1991 (age 35)	2011	2019	Youth system	N/A	
Forwards
11	Gelmin Rivas	(Venezuela)	ST / CF	23 March 1989 (age 37)	2017	2019	(United Arab Emirates) Sharjah	€2.3M	
18	Bafétimbi Gomis	(France)	ST	6 August 1985 (age 41)	2018	2020	(Turkey) Galatasaray	€12.5M	
25	Jonathan Soriano	(Spain)	ST	24 September 1985 (age 41)	2019	2020	(China) Beijing Guoan	Free	
44	Mukhtar Fallatah	(Saudi Arabia)	ST	15 October 1987 (age 39)	2017		(Saudi Arabia) Al-Wehda	Free	
Players sent out on loan
14	Mohanad Fallatah	(Saudi Arabia)	CM / DM	2 February 1996 (age 30)	2016	2019	Youth system	N/A	
17	Abdullah Al-Hafith	(Saudi Arabia)	CB	25 December 1992 (age 33)	2013	2020	(Portugal) Paços Ferreira	€0.4M	
20	Fahad Al-Rashidi	(Saudi Arabia)	LM	16 May 1996 (age 30)	2017	2020	Youth system	N/A	
77	Omar Kharbin	(Syria)	ST / CF / LM	15 January 1994 (age 32)	2017	2021	(United Arab Emirates) Al-Dhafra	€10.3M	

== Transfers ==
=== In ===
Date	Pos.	Name	Previous club	Fee	Source
26 June 2018	DF	(Spain) Alberto Botía	(Greece) Olympiacos	Free	
24 August 2018	FW	(France) Bafétimbi Gomis	(Turkey) Galatasaray	€12,500,000	
14 December 2018	FW	(Spain) Jonathan Soriano	(China) Beijing Guoan	Free	
12 January 2019	DF	(Australia) Milos Degenek	(Serbia) Red Star Belgrade	€3,500,000	
30 January 2019	FW	(Italy) Sebastian Giovinco	(Canada) Toronto	€2,600,000	
1 February 2019	MF	(Saudi Arabia) Hattan Bahebri	(Saudi Arabia) Al-Shabab	€3,490,000	

=== Loans in ===
Date	Pos.	Name	Parent club	End date	Source
20 July 2018	MF	(Peru) André Carrillo	(Portugal) Benfica	End of season	
9 August 2018	MF	(United Arab Emirates) Omar Abdulrahman	(United Arab Emirates) Al Ain	End of season	

=== Out ===
Date	Pos.	Name	New club	Fee	Source
27 May 2018	DF	(Saudi Arabia) Abdullah Al-Zori	(Saudi Arabia) Al-Wehda	Free	
27 May 2018	DF	(Saudi Arabia) Faisel Darwish	(Saudi Arabia) Al-Wehda	Free	
3 June 2018	DF	(Saudi Arabia) Ahmed Bamsaud	(Saudi Arabia) Al-Fayha	Free	
11 June 2018	GK	(Saudi Arabia) Ahmed Al-Shehri	(Saudi Arabia) Al-Nahda	Free	
1 July 2018	FW	(Brazil) Léo Bonatini	(England) Wolverhampton	€4,100,000	
31 July 2018	DF	(Saudi Arabia) Hussain Qassem	(Saudi Arabia) Al-Ettifaq	Free	
11 August 2018	MF	(Saudi Arabia) Mishari Al-Qahtani	(Saudi Arabia) Al-Tai	Free	
19 August 2018	FW	(Saudi Arabia) Malek Al-Abdulmenem	(Saudi Arabia) Al-Jabalain	Free	
23 August 2018	DF	(Saudi Arabia) Osama Hawsawi	(Saudi Arabia) Al-Wehda	Free	
26 August 2018	DF	(Saudi Arabia) Adel Al-Muwallad	(Saudi Arabia) Al-Jabalain	Free	
19 January 2019	FW	(Saudi Arabia) Mukhtar Fallatah	(Saudi Arabia) Al-Qadsiah	Free	
19 January 2019	FW	(Saudi Arabia) Rashed Al-Salem	(Saudi Arabia) Hajer	Free	
1 February 2019	DF	(Saudi Arabia) Mohammed Al-Baqawi	(Saudi Arabia) Al-Shabab	Free	
4 February 2019	FW	(Venezuela) Gelmin Rivas	(Qatar) Al-Rayyan	Free	

=== Loans out ===
Date	Pos.	Name	To	End date	Source
12 June 2018	FW	(Saudi Arabia) Mojahed Al-Munee	(Saudi Arabia) Al-Hazem	End of season	
25 July 2018	MF	(Argentina) Ezequiel Cerutti	(Argentina) Independiente	End of season	
7 August 2018	DF	(Saudi Arabia) Naif Kariri	(Saudi Arabia) Al-Fayha	End of season	
7 August 2018	FW	(Saudi Arabia) Abdulrahman Al-Yami	(Saudi Arabia) Al-Fayha	23 January 2018	
15 August 2018	DF	(Saudi Arabia) Anas Zabani	(Saudi Arabia) Al-Batin	End of season	
23 August 2018	DF	(Saudi Arabia) Muteb Al-Mufarrij	(Saudi Arabia) Al-Taawoun	End of season	
23 August 2018	DF	(Saudi Arabia) Omar Al-Owdah	(Saudi Arabia) Al-Fayha	End of season	
23 August 2018	MF	(Saudi Arabia) Majed Al-Najrani	(Saudi Arabia) Al-Fayha	End of season	
29 August 2018	MF	(Morocco) Achraf Bencharki	(France) Lens	End of season	
19 January 2019	MF	(Saudi Arabia) Fahad Al-Rashidi	(Saudi Arabia) Ohod	End of season	
21 January 2019	FW	(Syria) Omar Kharbin	(Egypt) Pyramids	End of season	
22 January 2019	MF	(Saudi Arabia) Mohanad Fallatah	(Saudi Arabia) Al-Fayha	End of season	
1 February 2019	DF	(Saudi Arabia) Abdullah Al-Hafith	(Saudi Arabia) Al-Ettifaq	End of season	

== Pre-season and friendlies ==
22 July 2018 Friendly	Al-Hilal (Saudi Arabia)	3–0	(Slovenia) Radomlje	Lienz, Austria
17:00 CEST	Carlos Eduardo 16'; Kharbin 32'; Rivas 54'	Report		Stadium: Dolomiten Stadium

25 July 2018 Friendly	Al-Hilal (Saudi Arabia)	0–2	(Germany) Fortuna Düsseldorf	Lienz, Austria
19:00 CEST		Report	Lukebakio 30'; Ducksch 90+1'

29 July 2018 Friendly	Al-Hilal (Saudi Arabia)	3–1	(Turkey) Akhisarspor	Lienz, Austria
18:00 CEST	Carlos Eduardo 33'; Kharbin 37'; Al-Shalhoub 72'	Report	89'	Stadium: Dolomiten Stadium

1 August 2018 Friendly	Al-Hilal (Saudi Arabia)	1–1	(Italy) Udinese	Lurnfeld, Austria
18:00 CEST	Fallatah 75'	Report	Machís 53'	Stadium: Möllbrück Stadium

== Competitions ==
Win Draw Loss

=== Saudi Super Cup ===
As champions of the 2017–18 Pro League, Al-Hilal took on the 2018 King Cup winners, Al-Ittihad, for the season-opening Saudi Super Cup.

18 August 2018 Final	Al-Hilal	2–1	Al-Ittihad	London, United Kingdom
19:30 BST	Carlos Eduardo 35'; Botía (yellow card) 44'; Rivas 62'	Report	Jonas (yellow card) 44'; El Ahmadi 67', (yellow card) 90+2'	Stadium: Loftus Road; Attendance: 16,300; Referee: Cüneyt Çakır (Turkey)

=== Pro League ===
Al-Hilal entered the competition as the defending champions.

==== League table ====
Pos	Team	Pld	W	D	L	GF	GA	GD	Pts	Qualification or relegation
1	Al-Nassr (C)	30	22	4	4	69	27	+42	70	Qualification for AFC Champions League group stage (Note: Al-Taawoun qualified for the AFC Champions League group stage as 2019 King Cup winners.)
2	Al-Hilal	30	21	6	3	66	33	+33	69	Qualification for AFC Champions League group stage
3	Al-Taawoun	30	16	8	6	61	31	+30	56	Qualification for AFC Champions League group stage
4	Al-Ahli	30	17	4	9	68	41	+27	55	Qualification for AFC Champions League play-off round
5	Al-Shabab	30	15	9	6	39	25	+14	54	Qualification for Arab Club Champions Cup

Source: spl.com
Rules for classification: 1) Points; 2) Head-to-head points; 3) Head-to-head goal difference; 4) Total goal difference; 5) Total goals scored; 6) Play-off (only for deciding champion, relegation and AFC competitions participation).
(C) Champions

==== Results summary ====
Overall								Home						Away					
Pld	W	D	L	GF	GA	GD	Pts	W	D	L	GF	GA	GD	W	D	L	GF	GA	GD
30	21	6	3	66	33	+33	69	9	4	2	33	19	+14	12	2	1	33	14	+19

Last updated: 16 May 2019.
Source: Competitive matches

==== Results by round ====
Round	1	2	3	4	5	6	7	8	9	10	11	12	13	14	15	16	17	18	19	20	21	22	23	24	25	26	27	28	29	30
Ground	H	A	H	A	H	A	H	A	A	A	A	H	H	H	A	H	A	H	A	H	A	H	H	H	A	A	A	H	A	H
Result	W	W	W	W	W	W	W	W	W	D	W	D	L	W	D	D	W	W	W	W	W	W	D	D	L	W	W	L	W	W
Position	2	1	1	1	3	2	2	1	1	1	1	1	1	1	1	1	1	1	1	1	1	1	1	1	2	2	1	2	2	2

Updated to match(es) played on 16 May 2019. Source: Competitive matches
A = Away; H = Home; W = Win; D = Draw; L = Loss

==== Matches ====
All times are local, AST (UTC+3).

Win Draw Loss Postponed

31 August 2018 1	Al-Hilal	1–0	Al-Fayha	Riyadh
18:55	S.Al-Dawsari (yellow card) 28' (yellow-red card) 74'; Al Bulaihi (yellow card) 39'; Kanno 77' (pen.); Al-Breik (yellow card) 79'; N.Al-Dawsari (yellow card) 83'	Report	Asprilla (yellow card) 21'; Al-Owda (yellow card) 49' (yellow-red card) 63'; Kanno (yellow card) 73' (yellow-red card) 80'	Stadium: King Saud University Stadium; Attendance: 22,076; Referee: Szymon Marciniak (Poland)

15 September 2018 2	Al-Raed	1–3	Al-Hilal	Buraidah
18:50	Doukha (yellow card) 40'; Hammoudan 52'; Al-Amri (yellow card) 54'; Farhan (yellow card) 74'	Report	Gomis 41'; Abdulrahman 45'; Carlos Eduardo 55' (pen.); Botía (yellow card) 68' (yellow-red card) 73'; Al-Faraj (yellow card) 74'; Al-Habsi (yellow card) 83'; Al-Shahrani (yellow card) 86'; Al-Breik (yellow card) 90+4'	Stadium: King Abdullah Sport City Stadium; Attendance: 6,833; Referee: Artur Soares Dias (Portugal)

20 September 2018 3	Al-Hilal	3–1	Al-Batin	Riyadh
20:45	Al-Faraj (yellow card) 27'; Al-Bulaihi 32'; Gomis 41', 45+4'	Report	Crysan 49'	Stadium: King Saud University Stadium; Attendance: 22,078; Referee: Damir Skomina (Slovenia)

24 September 2018 4	Al-Fateh	2–3	Al-Hilal	Al-Hasa
18:10	Oueslati 44' (pen.), 68' (pen.), (yellow card) 45+1'; Aguirregaray (yellow card) 52'; Bangoura (yellow card) 90+1'	Report	Kadesh (yellow card) 40'; Al-Habsi (yellow card) 42'; Gomis 59'; Carlos Eduardo 61'; Rivas 90+4'	Stadium: Prince Abdullah bin Jalawi Stadium; Attendance: 9,050; Referee: Paolo Valeri (Italy)

20 October 2018 6	Al-Shabab	0–1	Al-Hilal	Riyadh
19:45	Salem (yellow card) 50'; Euller (red card) 61'; Bahebri (yellow card) 67'; Benlamri (yellow card) 90+4'	Report	Al-Dawsari (yellow card) 50'; Al-Breik (yellow card) 63'; Kanno 65', (yellow card) 74'; Al-Bulaihi (yellow card) 82'	Stadium: Prince Faisal bin Fahd Stadium; Attendance: 6,260; Referee: Danny Makkelie (Netherlands)

25 October 2018 7	Al-Hilal	3–1	Al-Ittihad	Riyadh
20:30	Kanno 8' (pen.); Al-Bulaihi (yellow card) 47'; Gomis 74'; Botía (yellow card) 81'; Yasser Al-Shahrani (yellow card) 86'; Carlos Eduardo 90+5' (pen.)	Report	Pešić 19'; Al-Muziel (yellow card) 26'; Jurman (yellow card) 77'; Carleto (yellow card) 85'; Assiri (yellow card) 90+4'	Stadium: King Saud University Stadium; Attendance: 20,562; Referee: Viktor Kassai (Hungary)

2 November 2018 8	Al-Qadsiah	0–2	Al-Hilal	Khobar
17:35	Fallatah (yellow card) 44'	Report	Al-Dawsari 44' (pen.); Kanno 66'; Al-Shahrani (yellow card) 86'	Stadium: Prince Saud bin Jalawi Stadium; Attendance: 10,420; Referee: Bartosz Frankowski (Poland)

6 November 2018 5	Al-Hilal	4–1	Al-Ettifaq	Riyadh
17:55	Al-Dawsari 16'; Carrillo 45+1'; Gomis 55', 70'	Report	Al-Robeai (yellow card) 38'; Guanca 68'	Stadium: Prince Faisal bin Fahd Stadium; Attendance: 10,112; Referee: Milorad Mažić (Serbia)

11 November 2018 9	Al-Wehda	0–3	Al-Hilal	Mecca
18:20		Report	Al-Faraj 18'; Carlos Eduardo 29'; Al-Dawsari 45+2'; Al-Breik (yellow card) 90'	Stadium: King Abdul Aziz Stadium; Attendance: 32,567; Referee: Paweł Gil (Poland)

24 November 2018 10	Al-Faisaly	1–1	Al-Hilal	Al Majma'ah
17:50	Al-Bakr (yellow card) 31'; Puljić (yellow card) 78'; Al-Qahtani 90'	Report	Al Bulaihi (yellow card) 22'; Al-Faraj 80' (pen.); Al-Breik (yellow card) 89'	Stadium: King Salman Sport City Stadium; Attendance: 3,498; Referee: Viktor Kassai (Hungary)

8 December 2018 12	Al-Hilal	2–2	Al-Nassr	Riyadh
15:10	Gomis 3', 18'; Otayf (yellow card) 10'; Carlos Eduardo (yellow card) 38'; Al-Shahrani (yellow card) 59'; Botía (yellow card) 70'; Carrillo (red card) 90+4'	Report	Amrabat 73'; Hamdallah 78', (yellow card) 78'; Khamis (yellow card) 90'	Stadium: King Saud University Stadium; Attendance: 23,047; Referee: Néstor Pitana (Argentina)

12 December 2018 11	Ohod	0–1	Al-Hilal	Medina
18:20		Report	Gomis 54' (pen.)	Stadium: Prince Mohammed bin Abdul Aziz Stadium; Attendance: 20,207; Referee: Svein Oddvar Moen (Norway)

15 December 2018 13	Al-Hilal	1–2	Al-Hazem	Riyadh
15:05	Gomis 18'; Kadesh (yellow card) 80'	Report	Al-Saiari 46'; Muralha (yellow card) 75'; Alemão 80' (pen.); Asselah (yellow card) 90+1'; Al-Qeshtah (yellow card) 90+2'	Stadium: King Saud University Stadium; Attendance: 12,286; Referee: Milorad Mažić (Serbia)

21 December 2018 14	Al-Hilal	4–3	Al-Ahli	Riyadh
15:10	Al-Bulaihi (yellow card) 40'; Gomis 45+3' (pen.); Al-Shahrani 47'; Eduardo 66' (pen.) Carrillo 77'; Al-Breik (yellow card) 90+3'	Report	Al Somah 7', (yellow card) 76', (goal) 81' (pen.), 85'; Souza (yellow card) 31'; Al-Owais (yellow card) 38'; Díaz (yellow card) 65'	Stadium: King Saud University Stadium; Attendance: 21,577; Referee: Clément Turpin (France

30 December 2018 15	Al-Taawoun	2–2	Al-Hilal	Buraidah
18:00	Héldon 58'; Amissi (yellow card) 60' (yellow-red card) 90+7'; Cássio (yellow card) 82'; Al-Zubaidi (yellow card) 90+7'	Report	Rivas 34', (yellow card) 52'; Carrillo (yellow card) 55'; Kanno (yellow card) 57'; Botía 90+6'	Stadium: King Abdullah Sport City Stadium; Attendance: 14,893; Referee: Danny Makkelie (Netherlands)

11 January 2019 16	Al-Hilal	1–1	Al-Raed	Riyadh
15:25	Jahfali (yellow card) 66'; Al-Shalhoub 90+2'	Report	Belkaroui (yellow card) 59'; Hammoudan (yellow card) 80'; Al-Shoraimi (yellow card) 84'; Abo Shararah 90+4'	Stadium: King Saud University Stadium; Attendance: 20,490; Referee: Damir Skomina (Slovenia)

27 January 2019 17	Al-Fayha	1–5	Al-Hilal	Al Majma'ah
18:20	Al-Qarni 82'	Report	Botía (yellow card) 7'; Soriano 27', 43'; Carlos Eduardo 55', 57'; Rivas 90+3'	Stadium: King Salman Sport City Stadium; Attendance: 4,294; Referee: Kevin Blom (Netherlands)

4 February 2019 18	Al-Hilal	4–1	Al-Fateh	Riyadh
18:20	Al Bulaihi (yellow card) 11'; Gomis 16' (pen.), 37', (yellow card) 69'; Carlos Eduardo 32'; Al-Abed 62', (yellow card) 66'	Report	Oueslati 11' (pen.); João Pedro (yellow card) 15'; Aguirregaray (yellow card) 36'; Hamzi (yellow card) 39'	Stadium: King Saud University Stadium; Attendance: 22,486; Referee: Pawel Raczkowski (Poland)

8 February 2019 19	Al-Batin	2–3	Al-Hilal	Hafar al-Batin
20:15	Jhonnattann 25'; Ounalli (yellow card) 50', (goal) 85'; Kanabah (yellow card) 75'; Nasser (yellow card) 90+5'; Ghunaiman (yellow card) 90+5'; Facchini (yellow card) 90+6'	Report	Carrillo 18'; Kanno 72'; Carlos Eduardo (red card) 87'; Gomis 90+3'	Stadium: Al-Batin Club Stadium; Attendance: 6,000; Referee: Kevin Blom (Netherlands)

12 February 2019 20	Al-Hilal	4–1	Al-Qadsiah	Riyadh
18:30	Al Abed 34'; Gomis 46'; Al-Dawsari (yellow card) 60' (yellow-red card) 90+2'; Giovinco 80'; Al Bulaihi 88'	Report	Belkhiter (yellow card) 65'; Bismark 67'	Stadium: King Saud University Stadium; Attendance: 20,758; Referee: Tomasz Musiał (Poland)

21 February 2019 21	Al-Ittihad	0–2	Al-Hilal	Jeddah
20:25	El Ahmadi (yellow card) 70'; Al-Bishi (yellow card) 75'	Report	Gomis 67'; Al-Dawsari 82'; Degenek (yellow card) 90+4'	Stadium: King Abdullah Sports City; Attendance: 52,210; Referee: Danny Makkelie (Netherlands)

1 March 2019 22	Al-Hilal	2–1	Al-Faisaly	Riyadh
18:35	Giovinco 18', 79'; Degenek (yellow card) 47'; Al-Shahrani (red card) 90+4'	Report	Hyland (yellow card) 40'; Igor Rossi 49'	Stadium: King Saud University Stadium; Attendance: 22,688; Referee: Bakary Gassama (Gambia)

8 March 2019 23	Al-Hilal	1–1	Al-Wehda	Riyadh
20:30	Carlos Eduardo 47'; Jahfali (yellow card) 82'; Botía (yellow card) 83'	Report	Al-Nemer (yellow card) 38'; Abdu Jaber (yellow card) 73'; Assiri 77'; Bakshween (yellow card) 83'; Mebarakou (yellow card) 90'; Al-Jadaani (yellow card) 90+3'	Stadium: King Saud University Stadium; Attendance: 21,851; Referee: Damir Skomina (Slovenia)

23 March 2019 24	Al-Hilal	0–0	Ohod	Riyadh
20:05	Bahebri (yellow card) 53'; Al-Breik (yellow card) 90+4'	Report	Majrashi (yellow card) 34'; Teikeu (yellow card) 45'; Al-Owaishir (yellow card) 82'; Al-Dhaw (yellow card) 87'	Stadium: King Saud University Stadium; Attendance: 20,925; Referee: Ovidiu Hațegan (Romania)

29 March 2019 25	Al-Nassr	3–2	Al-Hilal	Riyadh
20:40	Al-Ghanam (yellow card) 45'; Hamdallah 46'; Al-Obaid (yellow card) 53'; Uvini 77', 90+7', (yellow card) 90+7'	Report	Kanno (yellow card) 20' (yellow-red card) 67'; Degenek (yellow card) 49'; Al-Bulaihi 53'; Carrillo (yellow card) 57'; Carlos Eduardo (yellow card) 60'; Al-Dawsari 79'	Stadium: King Fahd International Stadium; Attendance: 57,716; Referee: Cüneyt Çakır (Turkey)

4 April 2019 26	Al-Hazem	2–3	Al-Hilal	Ar Rass
20:45	Rodolfo 18'; Al-Khalaf (yellow card) 29'; Tsiskaridze 45+1', (yellow card) 68'; Al-Saiari (yellow card) 63'; Bakhit (yellow card) 69'	Report	Botía (yellow card) 12'; Gomis 48', 73'; Soriano 90', (yellow card) 90+6'	Stadium: Al-Hazem Club Stadium; Attendance: 6,200; Referee: Damir Skomina (Slovenia)

12 April 2019 27	Al-Ahli	0–1	Al-Hilal	Jeddah
20:45	Al-Harbi (yellow card) 27' (yellow-red card) 38'; Abdulghani (yellow card) 76'	Report	Al-Breik (yellow card) 20'; Botía 43'; Al-Dawsari (yellow card) 90'	Stadium: King Abdullah Sports City; Attendance: 33,868; Referee: Szymon Marciniak (Poland)

29 April 2019 28	Al-Hilal	0–2	Al-Taawoun	Riyadh
19:00	Al-Breik (yellow card) 51'	Report	Sufyani (yellow card) 43'; Al-Mousa (yellow card) 45+1'; Tawamba 65'; Héldon 69', (yellow card) 90+1'; Machado (yellow card) 81'	Stadium: King Saud University Stadium; Attendance: 22,335; Referee: Artur Soares Dias (Portugal)

11 May 2019 29	Al-Ettifaq	0–1	Al-Hilal	Dammam
22:30	Al-Robeai (yellow card) 18'; A.Al-Habib (yellow card) 27'; H.Al-Habib (yellow card) 72'; Al-Aboud (yellow card) 74'; Al-Haiti (yellow card) 88'	Report	Carlos Eduardo 51'; Bahebri (yellow card) 59'; Botía (yellow card) 62'; Giovinco (yellow card) 78'	Stadium: Prince Mohamed bin Fahd Stadium; Attendance: 10,365; Referee: Damir Skomina (Slovenia)

16 May 2019 30	Al-Hilal	3–2	Al-Shabab	Riyadh
22:30	Gomis 8', 90+1'; Giovinco 52'	Report	Benlamri (yellow card) 45+1'; Sebá 67'; Al-Sulayhem 87'	Stadium: King Saud University Stadium; Attendance: 10,000; Referee: Daniele Orsato (Italy)

=== King Cup ===
All times are local, AST (UTC+3).

5 January 2019 Round of 64	Al-Hilal	9–0	Al-Dera'a	Riyadh
15:20	Rivas 17', 68', 88'; Gomis 32', 51', 64', 72'; Carrillo 82'; Al-Rashed 85' (o.g.)	Report	Hawsawi (yellow card) 3'	Stadium: King Saud University Stadium; Referee: Sultan Al-Harbi

16 January 2019 Round of 32	Hajer	0–3	Al-Hilal	Al-Hasa
17:55		Report	Gomis 21' (pen.), 80'; Carlos Eduardo 63'	Stadium: Prince Abdullah bin Jalawi Stadium; Referee: Khaled Al-Teris

21 January 2019 Round of 16	Al-Hilal	3–2	Al-Faisaly	Riyadh
20:05	Gomis 19'; Carlos Eduardo (yellow card) 33'; Al-Dawsari 79'; Rivas 83'	Report	Rogerinho 2', 37'; Mendash (yellow card) 31'; Al-Sowayed (yellow card) 41'; Malayekah (yellow card) 89'	Stadium: King Saud University Stadium; Referee: Milorad Mažić (Serbia)

1 April 2019 Quarter-finals	Al-Ettifaq	2–3 (a.e.t.)	Al-Hilal	Dammam
18:35	Al-Kwikbi 28' (pen.); Arias (yellow card) 64'; Al-Aboud (yellow card) 75'; Guanca 87', (yellow card) 112'; Akaïchi (yellow card) 90+1'; Al-Sonain (yellow card) 100'	Report	Kanno (yellow card) 32'; Al-Khaibri (yellow card) 38'; Al-Shalhoub 65'; Jahfali 90+5'; Carrillo 105'; Al-Yami (yellow card) 117'	Stadium: Prince Mohamed bin Fahd Stadium; Referee: Matthew Conger (New Zealand)

26 April 2019 Semi-finals	Al-Hilal	0–5	Al-Taawoun	Riyadh
19:00		Report	Al-Zubaidi (yellow card) 10', (goal) 86'; Sandro Manoel 19'; Adam 22'; Amissi 56'; Tawamba 81'	Stadium: King Saud University Stadium; Referee: Danny Makkelie (Netherlands)

=== AFC Champions League ===
==== Group stage ====
The group stage draw was made on 22 November 2018 in Kuala Lumpur. Al-Hilal were drawn with Al-Duhail, Al-Ain, and Esteghlal.

Pos	Team	Pld	W	D	L	GF	GA	GD	Pts	Qualification	HIL	DUH	EST	AIN
1	(Saudi Arabia) Al-Hilal	6	4	1	1	10	5	+5	13	Advance to knockout stage	—	3–1	1–0	2–0
2	(Qatar) Al-Duhail	6	2	3	1	11	8	+3	9	Advance to knockout stage	2–2	—	3–0	2–2
3	(Iran) Esteghlal	6	2	2	2	6	8	−2	8		2–1	1–1	—	1–1
4	(United Arab Emirates) Al-Ain	6	0	2	4	4	10	−6	2		0–1	0–2	1–2	—

Source: AFC
Rules for classification: Group stage tiebreakers

5 March 2019 1	Al-Ain (United Arab Emirates)	0–1	(Saudi Arabia) Al-Hilal	Al Ain, United Arab Emirates
19:20 UTC+4	Doumbia (yellow card) 27'; Ibrahim (yellow card) 84'; Ismail (red card) 90'	Live Report; Stats Report	Al-Shalhoub 65'; Kanno (yellow card) 90+5'	Stadium: Hazza bin Zayed Stadium; Attendance: 9,726; Referee: Nawaf Shukralla (Bahrain)

12 March 2019 2	Al-Hilal (Saudi Arabia)	3–1	(Qatar) Al-Duhail	Riyadh, Saudi Arabia
18:45 UTC+3	Carlos Eduardo 25'; Kanno (yellow card) 44'; Giovinco (yellow card) 55'; Al-Bulaihi 77'; Gomis 79'; Al-Breik (yellow card) 80'	Live Report; Stats Report	Yasser (yellow card) 40'; Nakajima 75'; Benatia (yellow card) 88'; Luiz Júnior (yellow card) 90+2'	Stadium: King Saud University Stadium; Attendance: 22,929; Referee: Hettikamkanamge Perera (Sri Lanka)

8 April 2019 3	Esteghlal (Iran)	2–1	(Saudi Arabia) Al-Hilal	Doha, Qatar (Note: Matches between teams from Iran and Saudi Arabia are expected to be played on neutral venues due to deterioration of Iran–Saudi Arabia relations.)
20:00 UTC+3	Karimi 5', (yellow card) 19'; Montazeri 30'; Daneshgar (yellow card) 50'; Esmaeili (yellow card) 56'; Zakipour (yellow card) 90+5'	Live Report; Stats Report	Al-Bulaihi (yellow card) 32'; Gomis 71'	Stadium: Hamad bin Khalifa Stadium; Attendance: 947; Referee: Chris Beath (Australia)

23 April 2019 4	Al-Hilal (Saudi Arabia)	1–0	(Iran) Esteghlal	Abu Dhabi, United Arab Emirates
19:00 UTC+4	Al Abed (yellow card) 25' (yellow-red card) 52'; Al-Breik (yellow card) 48'; Giovinco 51', (yellow card) 88'; Al-Shahrani (yellow card) 74'	Live Report; Stats Report	Mensha (yellow card) 15'; Daneshgar (yellow card) 30'; Shojaeian (yellow card) 45'; Cheshmi (yellow card) 60'; Zakipour (yellow card) 76'	Stadium: Mohammed Bin Zayed Stadium; Attendance: 2,212; Referee: Ryuji Sato (Japan)

6 May 2019 5	Al-Hilal (Saudi Arabia)	2–0	(United Arab Emirates) Al-Ain	Riyadh, Saudi Arabia
22:00 UTC+3	Bahebri 1'; Al-Shalhoub 90'	Live Report; Stats Report	Caio (yellow card) 55'	Stadium: King Saud University Stadium; Attendance: 12,105; Referee: Valentin Kovalenko (Uzbekistan)

20 May 2019 6	Al-Duhail (Qatar)	2–2	(Saudi Arabia) Al-Hilal	Doha, Qatar
21:00 UTC+3	El-Arabi 15'; Muneer 90+2'	Live Report; Stats Report	Gomis 29', 55'	Stadium: Abdullah bin Khalifa Stadium; Attendance: 4,170; Referee: Minoru Tōjō (Japan)

=== Arab Club Champions Cup ===
==== Round of 32 ====
12 August 2018 First leg	Al-Hilal (Saudi Arabia)	1–0	(Oman) Al-Shabab	Riyadh, Saudi Arabia
20:30 AST	Al-Breik 23'	Report		Stadium: King Saud University Stadium; Referee: Mustapha Ghorbal (Algeria)

29 September 2018 Second leg	Al-Shabab (Oman)	0–1 (0–2 agg.)	(Saudi Arabia) Al-Hilal	Seeb, Oman
18:00 AST		Report	Carlos Eduardo 61'	Stadium: Al-Seeb Stadium; Referee: Ali Sabah (Iraq)

==== Round of 16 ====
29 October 2018 First leg	Al-Hilal (Saudi Arabia)	4–0	(Iraq) Al-Naft	Riyadh, Saudi Arabia
20:00 AST	Gomis 35' (pen.); Carrillo 61'; Al-Shahrani 67'; Abu Baker 70' (o.g.)	Report		Stadium: Prince Faisal bin Fahd Stadium; Referee: Mahmoud El Banna (Egypt)

30 November 2018 Second leg	Al-Naft (Iraq)	0–2 (0–6 agg.)	(Saudi Arabia) Al-Hilal	Erbil, Iraq
17:00 AST	Tahsin (red card) 52'; Dawood (yellow card) 58'	Report	Gomis 13'; Carlos Eduardo 31'	Stadium: Franso Hariri Stadium; Referee: Youssef Essrayri (Tunisia)

==== Quarter-finals ====
16 February 2019 First leg	Al-Hilal (Saudi Arabia)	3–0	(Egypt) Al Ittihad Alexandria	Riyadh, Saudi Arabia
20:00 AST	Carlos Eduardo 14'; Gomis 31', 41'	Report	Rizk (yellow card) 6'	Stadium: King Saud University Stadium; Attendance: 15,184; Referee: Noureddine El Jaafari (Morocco)

25 February 2019 Second leg	Al Ittihad Alexandria (Egypt)	0–0 (0–3 agg.)	(Saudi Arabia) Al-Hilal	Alexandria, Egypt
18:00 EST	Bazoka (yellow card) 15'; El Ghandour (yellow card) 18'	Report	Al-Dawsari (yellow card) 37'; Soriano (yellow card) 43'	Stadium: Borg El Arab Stadium; Referee: Mustapha Ghorbal (Algeria)

==== Semi-finals ====
17 March 2019 First leg	Al-Hilal (Saudi Arabia)	1–0	(Saudi Arabia) Al-Ahli	Riyadh, Saudi Arabia
18:45 AST	Botía (yellow card) 45+1'; Soriano 49'	Report	Al-Mousa (yellow card) 61'; Assiri (yellow card) 90+5'	Stadium: King Saud University Stadium; Referee: Ammar Al-Jeneibi (United Arab Emirates)

15 April 2019 Second leg	Al-Ahli (Saudi Arabia)	1–0 (1–1 agg.) (2–3 p)	(Saudi Arabia) Al-Hilal	Jeddah, Saudi Arabia
20:45 AST	Díaz 18'; Al-Mogahwi (yellow card) 24'; Al-Mowalad (yellow card) 68'; Al-Mousa (yellow card) 90+2'	Report	Al-Khaibri (yellow card) 73'; Al-Breik (yellow card) 82'; Al-Bulaihi (yellow card) 86'	Stadium: King Abdullah Sports City; Attendance: 33,257; Referee: Gehad Grisha (Egypt)
	Penalties
	Al Somah (penalty scored); Díaz (penalty missed); Stanciu (penalty scored); Al-Mogahwi (penalty missed); Assiri (penalty missed)		(penalty missed) Carlos Eduardo; (penalty scored) Al-Breik; (penalty missed) Al-Shalhoub; (penalty scored) Gomis; (penalty scored) Al Abed

==== Final ====
18 April 2019 Final	Al-Hilal (Saudi Arabia)	1–2	(Tunisia) Étoile du Sahel	Al Ain, United Arab Emirates
17:50 UTC+4	Botía (yellow card) 45+4'; Gomis 64' (pen.); Al-Bulaihi (yellow card) 90+5'	Report	Aribi 30'; Aouadhi (yellow card) 45'; Ben Aziza (yellow card) 45'; Chikhaoui (yellow card) 45+7'; Ben Ouanes (yellow card) 53'; Boughattas (yellow card) 58'; Konaté (yellow card) 60'; Hannachi (yellow card) 72'; Mothnani 90+1', (yellow card) 90+2'	Stadium: Hazza bin Zayed Stadium; Referee: Mohammed Abdulla Hassan Mohamed (United Arab Emirates)

=== Saudi-Egyptian Super Cup ===
As champions of the 2017–18 Pro League, Al-Hilal took on the 2017–18 Egypt Cup winners, Zamalek, for the Saudi-Egyptian Super Cup.

6 October 2018 Final	Al-Hilal (Saudi Arabia)	1–2	(Egypt) Zamalek	Riyadh, Saudi Arabia
20:00 AST	Kharbin 57'	Report	Hamed (yellow card) 24'; Nagguez 40'; Kasongo 45+1'; Sassi (yellow card) 64'	Stadium: King Saud University Stadium; Referee: Felix Brych (Germany)

== Statistics ==
=== Appearances ===
Last updated on 20 May 2019.

No.	Pos	Nat	Player	Total		Pro League		King Cup		Champions League		Sheikh Zayed Cup		Saudi Super Cup		Saudi-Egyptian Cup	
No.	Pos	Nat	Player	Apps	Goals	Apps	Goals	Apps	Goals	Apps	Goals	Apps	Goals	Apps	Goals	Apps	Goals
Goalkeepers
1	GK	(Saudi Arabia) KSA	Abdullah Al-Mayouf	26	0	9+1	0	2	0	6	0	7	0	0	0	1	0
26	GK	(Oman) OMA	Ali Al-Habsi	27	0	21	0	3	0	0	0	2	0	1	0	0	0
30	GK	(Saudi Arabia) KSA	Mohammed Al-Waked	0	0	0	0	0	0	0	0	0	0	0	0	0	0
Defenders
2	DF	(Saudi Arabia) KSA	Mohammed Al-Breik	41	1	25+1	0	0	0	5	0	8	1	1	0	1	0
4	DF	(Spain) ESP	Alberto Botía	41	2	26	2	4	0	0	0	9	0	1	0	1	0
5	DF	(Saudi Arabia) KSA	Ali Al Bulaihi	39	4	24+1	3	0	0	6	1	6	0	1	0	1	0
12	DF	(Saudi Arabia) KSA	Yasser Al-Shahrani	38	2	21	1	1	0	5+1	0	7+1	1	1	0	1	0
13	DF	(Saudi Arabia) KSA	Hassan Kadesh	23	0	11+1	0	5	0	1+1	0	3	0	0+1	0	0	0
32	DF	(Saudi Arabia) KSA	Mohammed Al-Dossari	0	0	0	0	0	0	0	0	0	0	0	0	0	0
33	DF	(Saudi Arabia) KSA	Ahmed Sharahili	4	0	1+1	0	0+1	0	0	0	0+1	0	0	0	0	0
45	DF	(Australia) AUS	Milos Degenek	18	0	11	0	2	0	5	0	0	0	0	0	0	0
70	DF	(Saudi Arabia) KSA	Mohammed Jahfali	24	1	5+4	0	5	1	6	0	4	0	0	0	0	0
Midfielders
3	MF	(Brazil) BRA	Carlos Eduardo	45	16	26	10	3	1	6	1	8	3	1	1	1	0
6	MF	(Saudi Arabia) KSA	Abdulmalek Al-Khaibri	14	0	3+3	0	1	0	3	0	2+2	0	0	0	0	0
7	MF	(Saudi Arabia) KSA	Salman Al-Faraj	10	2	6+2	2	0	0	0	0	1	0	0	0	1	0
8	MF	(Saudi Arabia) KSA	Abdullah Otayf	23	0	8+9	0	0+1	0	0+1	0	2+1	0	0	0	0+1	0
10	MF	(Saudi Arabia) KSA	Mohammad Al-Shalhoub	27	4	2+10	1	2+1	1	2+3	2	2+5	0	0	0	0	0
15	MF	(Saudi Arabia) KSA	Ahmed Ashraf	15	0	2+6	0	2+1	0	0	0	1+3	0	0	0	0	0
16	MF	(Saudi Arabia) KSA	Nasser Al-Dawsari	28	1	5+8	0	1+4	1	1+1	0	4+3	0	0+1	0	0	0
19	MF	(Peru) PER	André Carrillo	33	6	20+1	3	4	2	0	0	6	1	1	0	0+1	0
21	MF	(United Arab Emirates) UAE	Omar Abdulrahman	7	1	5	1	0	0	0	0	0	0	1	0	1	0
24	MF	(Saudi Arabia) KSA	Nawaf Al Abed	15	2	3+4	2	2+1	0	1+1	0	0+3	0	0	0	0	0
27	MF	(Saudi Arabia) KSA	Hattan Bahebri	17	1	3+2	0	2	0	3+3	1	2+2	0	0	0	0	0
28	MF	(Saudi Arabia) KSA	Mohamed Kanno	49	5	28+1	5	5	0	4+1	0	8	0	1	0	1	0
29	MF	(Saudi Arabia) KSA	Salem Al-Dawsari	37	5	22+1	5	0+1	0	2	0	8+1	0	1	0	1	0
37	MF	(Saudi Arabia) KSA	Mohammed Al-Quna'an	0	0	0	0	0	0	0	0	0	0	0	0	0	0
38	MF	(Saudi Arabia) KSA	Khaled Al Gubaie	1	0	0	0	0	0	0+1	0	0	0	0	0	0	0
39	MF	(Saudi Arabia) KSA	Nawaf Sharahili	0	0	0	0	0	0	0	0	0	0	0	0	0	0
88	MF	(Saudi Arabia) KSA	Salem Al-Saleem	0	0	0	0	0	0	0	0	0	0	0	0	0	0
Forwards
9	FW	(Italy) ITA	Sebastian Giovinco	17	5	5+5	4	0+2	0	5	1	0	0	0	0	0	0
18	FW	(France) FRA	Bafétimbi Gomis	45	37	29+1	21	3	7	6	4	5+1	5	0	0	0	0
25	FW	(Spain) ESP	Jonathan Soriano	13	4	1+7	3	3	0	0	0	2	1	0	0	0	0
31	FW	(Saudi Arabia) KSA	Abdulrahman Al-Yami	4	0	0	0	1+1	0	0+2	0	0	0	0	0	0	0
Players sent out on loan this season
14	MF	(Saudi Arabia) KSA	Mohanad Fallatah	0	0	0	0	0	0	0	0	0	0	0	0	0	0
20	MF	(Saudi Arabia) KSA	Fahad Al-Rashidi	1	0	0+1	0	0	0	0	0	0	0	0	0	0	0
27	MF	(Morocco) MAR	Achraf Bencharki	0	0	0	0	0	0	0	0	0	0	0	0	0	0
77	FW	(Syria) SYR	Omar Kharbin	8	1	1+3	0	0	0	0	0	2	0	0+1	0	0+1	1
Player who made an appearance this season but have left the club
11	FW	(Venezuela) VEN	Gelmin Rivas	18	8	5+8	3	1+2	4	0	0	0	0	1	1	1	0
22	DF	(Saudi Arabia) KSA	Mohammed Al-Baqawi	7	0	2+1	0	3	0	0	0	0+1	0	0	0	0	0
44	FW	(Saudi Arabia) KSA	Mukhtar Fallatah	1	0	0	0	0	0	0	0	0+1	0	0	0	0	0

=== Goalscorers ===
Rank	No.	Pos	Nat	Name	Pro League	King Cup	Champions League	Sheikh Zayed Cup	Saudi Super Cup	Saudi-Egyptian Super Cup	Total
1	18	FW	(France)	Bafétimbi Gomis	21	7	4	5	0	0	37
2	3	MF	(Brazil)	Carlos Eduardo	10	1	1	3	1	0	16
3	11	FW	(Venezuela)	Gelmin Rivas	3	4	0	0	1	0	8
4	19	MF	(Peru)	André Carrillo	3	2	0	1	0	0	6
5	9	FW	(Italy)	Sebastian Giovinco	4	0	1	0	0	0	5
5	28	MF	(Saudi Arabia)	Mohamed Kanno	5	0	0	0	0	0	5
5	29	MF	(Saudi Arabia)	Salem Al-Dawsari	5	0	0	0	0	0	5
8	5	DF	(Saudi Arabia)	Ali Al Bulaihi	3	0	1	0	0	0	4
8	10	MF	(Saudi Arabia)	Mohammad Al-Shalhoub	1	1	2	0	0	0	4
8	25	FW	(Spain)	Jonathan Soriano	3	0	0	1	0	0	4
11	4	DF	(Spain)	Alberto Botía	2	0	0	0	0	0	2
11	7	MF	(Saudi Arabia)	Salman Al-Faraj	2	0	0	0	0	0	2
11	12	DF	(Saudi Arabia)	Yasser Al-Shahrani	1	0	0	1	0	0	2
11	24	MF	(Saudi Arabia)	Nawaf Al Abed	2	0	0	0	0	0	2
15	2	DF	(Saudi Arabia)	Mohammed Al-Breik	0	0	0	1	0	0	1
15	16	MF	(Saudi Arabia)	Nasser Al-Dawsari	0	1	0	0	0	0	1
15	21	MF	(United Arab Emirates)	Omar Abdulrahman	1	0	0	0	0	0	1
15	27	MF	(Saudi Arabia)	Hattan Bahebri	0	0	1	0	0	0	1
15	70	DF	(Saudi Arabia)	Mohammed Jahfali	0	1	0	0	0	0	1
15	77	FW	(Syria)	Omar Kharbin	0	0	0	0	0	1	1
Own goal					0	1	0	1	0	0	2
Total					66	18	10	13	2	1	110

Last Updated: 20 May 2019

=== Assists ===
Rank	No.	Pos	Nat	Name	Pro League	King Cup	Champions League	Sheikh Zayed Cup	Saudi Super Cup	Saudi-Egyptian Super Cup	Total
1	19	MF	(Peru)	André Carrillo	6	3	0	1	0	1	11
2	18	FW	(France)	Bafétimbi Gomis	7	1	0	1	0	0	9
3	3	MF	(Brazil)	Carlos Eduardo	2	2	1	2	1	0	8
4	2	DF	(Saudi Arabia)	Mohammed Al-Breik	6	0	1	0	0	0	7
5	10	MF	(Saudi Arabia)	Mohammad Al-Shalhoub	4	0	0	2	0	0	6
5	28	MF	(Saudi Arabia)	Mohamed Kanno	5	1	0	0	0	0	6
5	29	MF	(Saudi Arabia)	Salem Al-Dawsari	3	0	2	1	0	0	6
8	9	FW	(Italy)	Sebastian Giovinco	1	1	1	0	0	0	3
8	11	FW	(Venezuela)	Gelmin Rivas	1	2	0	0	0	0	3
8	24	MF	(Saudi Arabia)	Nawaf Al Abed	1	1	1	0	0	0	3
11	12	DF	(Saudi Arabia)	Yasser Al-Shahrani	1	0	0	1	0	0	2
11	13	DF	(Saudi Arabia)	Yasser Al-Shahrani	0	2	0	0	0	0	2
13	8	MF	(Saudi Arabia)	Abdullah Otayf	1	0	0	0	0	0	1
13	21	MF	(United Arab Emirates)	Omar Abdulrahman	1	0	0	0	0	0	1
13	27	MF	(Saudi Arabia)	Hattan Bahebri	0	0	1	0	0	0	1
13	45	DF	(Australia)	Milos Degenek	1	0	0	0	0	0	1
Total					40	13	7	8	1	1	70

Last Updated: 20 May 2019

=== Clean sheets ===
Rank	No.	Pos	Nat	Name	Pro League	King Cup	Champions League	Sheikh Zayed Cup	Saudi Super Cup	Saudi-Egyptian Super Cup	Total
1	1	GK	(Saudi Arabia)	Abdullah Al-Mayouf	3	1	3	5	0	0	12
2	26	GK	(Oman)	Ali Al-Habsi	6	1	0	2	0	0	9
Total					9	2	3	7	0	0	21

Last Updated: 11 May 2019
