= Kaebi =

Kaebi is an Arabic surname. Notable people with the surname include:

- Ahmed Al-Kaebi (born 1987), Saudi football player
- Hossein Kaebi (born 1985), Iranian football player
- Tareq Al-Kaebi (born 1992), Saudi football player
