= Abdulrahman Al-Rio =

Saudi Arabian footballer

Abdurahman Al-Rio
Personal information
- Full name: Abdulrahman Khalid Al-Rio
- Date of birth: 15 May 1994 (age 32)
- Place of birth: Jeddah, Saudi Arabia
- Height: 1.89 m (6 ft 2 1/2 in)
- Position: Defender

Team information
- Current team: Al-Sadd
- Number: 26

Senior career*
Years	Team	Apps	(Gls)
2016–2019	Al-Ittihad	7	(0)
2018–2019	→ Al-Hazem (loan)	13	(0)
2019–2020	Al-Wehda	7	(0)
2020–2022	Damac	22	(0)
2022	→ Al-Hazem (loan)	1	(0)
2022–2023	Al-Faisaly	9	(0)
2023–2024	Al-Okhdood	4	(0)
2024–2025	Abha	17	(0)
2025–	Al-Sadd	0	(0)

International career^{‡}
2014	Saudi Arabia U23	3	(0)
- * Club domestic league appearances and goals as of 19 August 2017 ‡ National team caps and goals as of March 25, 2017

Abdulrahman Al-Rio (Arabic: عبد الرحمن الريو; born 15 May 1994) is a Saudi Arabian footballer who plays for Al-Sadd as a full-back.

== Club career ==
In 2016, Al-Rio was called up to Al-Ittihad's first team. On 20 April 2016, Al-Rio made his senior team debut in the 5th matchday of the AFC Champions League against Sepahan, playing the full 90 minutes by coach Victor Pițurcă. On 14 March 2017, Al-Rio made his Saudi Professional League debut against Al-Batin F.C., replacing Bader Al-Nakhli at the 82nd minute.

On 23 August 2018, Al-Rio joined Al-Hazem until the end of the 2018–19 season. On 6 July 2019, Al-Rio joined Al-Wehda on a free transfer. On 28 September 2020, Al-Rio joined Damac. On 26 January 2022, Al-Rio joined Al-Hazem on loan for the second time. On 9 September 2022, Al-Rio joined Al-Faisaly on a free transfer. On 21 July 2023, Al-Rio joined Al-Okhdood. On 3 October 2025, Al-Rio joined Al-Sadd.

== Career statistics ==
=== Club ===
As of match played 27 May 2024

Club	Season	League		Cup		Continental		Other		Total	
Club	Season	Apps	Goals	Apps	Goals	Apps	Goals	Apps	Goals	Apps	Goals
Al-Ittihad	2015–16	0	0	0	0	2	0	0	0	2	0
Al-Ittihad	2016–17	4	0	0	0	—		0	0	4	0
Al-Ittihad	2017–18	3	0	0	0	—		—		3	0
Al-Ittihad	Total	7	0	0	0	2	0	0	0	9	0
Al-Hazem (loan)	2018–19	13	0	1	0	—		1 (Note: Appearances in relegation play-offs)	0	15	0
Al-Wehda	2019–20	7	0	2	0	—		—		9	0
Damac	2020–21	14	0	0	0	—		—		14	0
Damac	2021–22	8	0	1	0	—		—		9	0
Damac	Total	22	0	1	0	0	0	0	0	23	0
Al-Hazem (loan)	2021–22	1	0	0	0	—		—		1	0
Al-Faisaly	2022–23	9	0	—		0	0	—		9	0
Al-Okhdood	2023–24	4	0	1	0	—		—		5	0
Career totals		63	0	5	0	2	0	1	0	71	0

== Honours ==
Al-Ittihad

- Saudi Crown Prince Cup: 2016–17
- King Cup: 2018
