= Driss Fettouhi =

Moroccan footballer (born 1989)

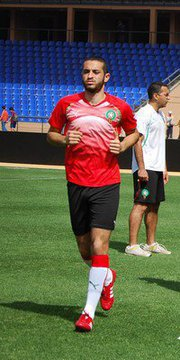
- Fettouhi with Morocco U-23 in 2011

Personal information
- Full name: Driss Fettouhi
- Date of birth: 30 September 1989 (age 37)
- Place of birth: Casablanca, Morocco
- Height: 1.85 m (6 ft 1 in)
- Position: Midfielder

Team information
- Current team: Al Ahli
- Number: 8

Youth career
- 1999–2002: Wydad Casablanca

Senior career*
| Years | Team | Apps | (Gls) |
| 2007–2009 | Le Havre B | | |
| 2009 | Le Havre | 23 | (0) |
| 2009–2013 | Istres | 91 | (11) |
| 2013–2016 | Ajman | 60 | (21) |
| 2016 | Al Kharaitiyat | 0 | (0) |
| 2016–2019 | Dibba Al-Fujairah | 63 | (9) |
| 2019–2020 | Al-Hazem | 30 | (3) |
| 2020–2021 | Al Ahli (Jeddah) | 20 | (2) |
| 2021–2022 | Al-Sailiya | 22 | (6) |
| 2022–2025 | Al-Markhiya | 44 | (13) |
| 2024–2025 | → Al Ahli (Doha) (loan) | 21 | (1) |
| 2025– | Al Ahli (Doha) | 13 | (1) |

International career^{‡}
| 2011–2012 | Morocco U23 | 24 | (3) |
| 2021– | Morocco | 3 | (0) |
- * Club domestic league appearances and goals as of 17 January 2026 ‡ National team caps and goals as of 7 December 2021

Driss Fettouhi (Arabic: إدريس فتوحي; born 30 September 1989) is a Moroccan professional footballer who plays for Al Ahli.

== Club career ==
Born in Casablanca, Fettouhi started playing football at Wydad Casablanca. At 16, Fettouhi participated in and won the 2007 edition of a Moroccan reality TV show called "Golden Foot". The winner and nine finalists participated in a training session of Le Havre AC. In the summer of 2009, Fettouhi joined FC Istres Ouest Provence, in Ligue 2. In 2013, Fettouhi joined Emirati club Ajman.

== International career ==
Fettouhi has been playing international football since 9 February 2011. He was the captain of the Morocco national under-23 football team in the 2012 Summer Olympics, which his team qualified for after beating Nigeria, Egypt, and Algeria. He played in all 3 of the Atlas Lions' games there.

He made his debut for the Morocco national football team on 1 December 2021 in a 2021 FIFA Arab Cup game against Palestine.

== Honours ==
Al-Sailiya

- Qatari Stars Cup: 2021-22
