= Ahmed Al-Kaebi =

Saudi Arabian footballer

Personal information
- Full name: Ahmed Mohammed Al-Kaebi
- Date of birth: December 1, 1987 (age 38)
- Place of birth: Saudi Arabia
- Height: 1.74 m (5 ft 8 1/2 in)
- Position: Midfielder

Senior career*
| Years | Team | Apps | (Gls) |
| 2008–2011 | Al-Shabab | | |
| 2009 | → Al-Qadisiyah FC (loan) | | |
| 2011–2013 | Al-Raed FC | | |
| 2013–2014 | Al-Shoulla F.C. | | |
| 2014–2015 | Al-Hazm F.C. | | |
| 2015–2016 | Al-Riyadh SC | | |
| 2016–2017 | Al-Kawkab | | |
- * Club domestic league appearances and goals

Ahmed Al-Kaebi (born 1 December 1987) is a Saudi football player who played in the Pro League for Al-Shabab, Al-Raed and Al-Shoulla.
