= Masoud Bakheet =

Saudi Arabian footballer

Personal information
- Full name: Masoud Hamad Bakheet
- Date of birth: January 5, 1992 (age 34)
- Place of birth: Saudi Arabia
- Height: 1.67 m (5 ft 6 in)
- Position: Right back

Team information
- Current team: Al-Wehda
- Number: 32

Youth career
- Hetten

Senior career*
Years	Team	Apps	(Gls)
2012–2015	Hetten		
2015–2016	Al-Nahda		
2016–2022	Al-Hazem	111	(6)
2022	Ohod	18	(1)
2022–2023	Al-Riyadh	19	(0)
2023–2025	Al-Jabalain	63	(1)
2025–	Al-Wehda		
- * Club domestic league appearances and goals as of 13 January 2022

Masoud Bakheet (Arabic: مسعود بخيت; born 5 January 1992) is a Saudi Arabian professional footballer who plays as a right back for Al-Wehda.

== Club career ==
Bakheet started his career with Hetten coming through the youth ranks before being promoted to the first team. On June 25, 2015, Bakhit joined Al-Nahda. He spent a year at the club before signing for Al-Hazem. With Al-Hazem, he helped the club achieve promotion to the Pro League. On 13 January 2022, Bakheet joined Ohod. On 16 June 2022, Bakheet joined Al-Riyadh. On 10 June 2023, Bakheet joined Al-Jabalain. In September 2025, Bakheet joined Al-Wehda.

== Honours ==
Al-Hazem

- MS League: 2020–21, runner-up 2017–18
