= Salem Al-Hamdan =

Saudi Arabian footballer

Personal information
- Full name: Salem Adel Al-Hamdan
- Date of birth: May 5, 1992 (age 34)
- Place of birth: Saudi Arabia
- Height: 1.72 m (5 ft 7 1/2 in)
- Position: Left back

Team information
- Current team: Al-Taraji
- Number: 12

Youth career
- Al-Qadsiah

Senior career*
Years	Team	Apps	(Gls)
2014–2017	Al-Qadsiah	2	(1)
2016–2017	→ Al-Hazem (loan)		
2017–2019	Al-Hazem	13	(11)
2019–2021	Al-Qadsiah	2	(2)
2020	→ Al-Bukayriyah (loan)	12	(7)
2020–2021	→ Al-Nojoom (loan)	23	(5)
2021–2022	Al-Nahda	12	(6)
2023–2024	Al-Hada		
2024–2025	Al-Nahda		
2025–	Al-Taraji		
- * Club domestic league appearances and goals as of 12 April 2018

Salem Al-Hamdan (Arabic: سالم الحمدان, born 5 May 1992) is a Saudi Arabian football player who currently plays for Al-Taraji as a left back.

== Career ==
On 29 September 2025, Al-Hamdan joined Al-Taraji.
