= Tareq Al-Kaebi =

Saudi Arabian footballer

Personal information
- Full name: Tareq Yahya Al-Kaebi
- Date of birth: August 1, 1992 (age 34)
- Place of birth: Saudi Arabia
- Height: 1.70 m (5 ft 7 in)
- Positions: Midfielder; right-back

Youth career
- Al-Raed

Senior career*
Years	Team	Apps	(Gls)
2013–2014	Al-Raed	2	(0)
2014–2019	Al-Hazem	76	(3)
2019	Al-Jabalain	1	(0)
2020–2024	Al-Kholood		
2024–2025	Al-Washm		
2025–2026	Al-Kawkab		
- * Club domestic league appearances and goals

Tareq Al-Kaebi (Arabic: طارق الكعبي; born August 1, 1992) is a Saudi football player who plays as a midfielder and a right back.

== Career ==
On 23 January 2020, Al-Kaebi joined Al-Kholood.

On 20 September 2024, Al-Kaebi joined Al-Washm.

On 15 August 2025, Al-Kaebi joined Al-Kawkab.
