= Mohammed Al-Saiari =

Saudi Arabian footballer

Personal information
- Full name: Mohammed Eidah Al-Saiari
- Date of birth: May 2, 1993 (age 33)
- Place of birth: Sharurah, Saudi Arabia
- Height: 1.80 m (5 ft 11 in)
- Position: Forward

Team information
- Current team: Jeddah (on loan from Al-Tai)
- Number: 70

Senior career*
Years	Team	Apps	(Gls)
2013–2015	Al-Ittihad	1	(0)
2015–2016	Hajer	18	(6)
2016–2019	Al-Ettifaq	20	(1)
2017	→ Al-Taawon (loan)	10	(4)
2018–2019	→ Al-Hazem (loan)	25	(10)
2019–2020	Al-Wehda	11	(0)
2020	→ Al-Faisaly (loan)	6	(1)
2020–2022	Al-Faisaly	32	(7)
2022–2023	Al-Ittihad	10	(1)
2023–2024	Al-Qadsiah	21	(2)
2024–2025	Al-Orobah	9	(0)
2025–	Al-Tai	21	(2)
2026–	→ Jeddah (loan)	0	(0)

International career^{‡}
2015	Saudi Arabia U23	3	(1)
2018–	Saudi Arabia	4	(0)
- * Club domestic league appearances and goals as of 11:59, 1 June 2023 (UTC) ‡ National team caps and goals as of 21 January 2019

Mohammed Eidah Al-Saiari (Arabic: محمد عيضه الصيعري; born May 2, 1993) is a Saudi football player who plays for Jeddah, on loan from Al-Tai as a forward.

== International ==
He was included in the 2019 AFC Asian Cup squad for Saudi Arabia national football team and made his debut for the squad on 31 December 2018 in a friendly against South Korea as a 61st-minute substitute for Fahad Al-Muwallad.

== Career statistics ==
=== Club ===
As of match played 28 May 2024

Club	Season	League		King Cup		Asia		Other		Total	
Club	Season	Apps	Goals	Apps	Goals	Apps	Goals	Apps	Goals	Apps	Goals
Al-Ittihad	2013–14	1	0	0	0	0	0	1 (Note: Appearances in Crown Prince Cup)	0	2	0
Al-Ittihad	2014–15	0	0	0	0	—		0	0	0	0
Al-Ittihad	Total	1	0	0	0	0	0	1	0	2	0
Hajer	2015–16	18	6	0	0	—		2	2	20	8
Al-Ettifaq	2016–17	8	1	0	0	—		1	0	9	1
Al-Ettifaq	2017–18	12	0	2	3	—		—		14	3
Al-Ettifaq	Total	20	1	2	3	0	0	1	0	23	4
Al-Taawoun (loan)	2016–17	10	4	2	0	5	1	0	0	17	5
Al-Hazem (loan)	2018–19	25	10	0	0	—		2 (Note: Appearances in Relegation play-offs)	1	27	11
Al-Wehda	2019–20	11	0	2	0	—		—		13	0
Al-Faisaly (loan)	2019–20	6	1	0	0	—		—		6	1
Al-Faisaly	2020–21	20	6	2	2	—		—		22	8
Al-Faisaly	2021–22	12	1	1	0	4	0	1 (Note: Appearances in Saudi Super Cup)	0	18	1
Al-Faisaly	Total	32	7	3	2	4	0	1	0	40	9
Al-Ittihad	2022–23	10	1	2	0	—		0	0	12	1
Al-Qadsiah	2023–24	21	2	1	0	—		0	0	22	2
Al-Orobah	2024–25	9	0	1	0	—		—		10	0
Career totals		163	32	13	5	9	1	7	3	192	41

== Honours ==
Al-Faisaly

- King Cup: 2020–21

Al-Ittihad

- Saudi Professional League: 2022–23
- Saudi Super Cup: 2022

Al-Qadsiah

- First Division League: 2023–24
