= Abdulwahab Jaafer =

Saudi Arabian footballer

Personal information
- Full name: Abdulwahab Sulaiman Jaafer
- Date of birth: September 15, 1993 (age 33)
- Place of birth: Saudi Arabia
- Height: 1.65 m (5 ft 5 in)
- Position: Winger

Team information
- Current team: Al-Safa
- Number: 15

Youth career
- ???–2013: Al-Tuhami
- 2013–2015: Al-Shabab

Senior career*
Years	Team	Apps	(Gls)
2015–2018	Al-Shabab	43	(1)
2018–2019	Al-Hazem	1	(0)
2019–2021	Damac	16	(1)
2021–2023	Al-Tai	19	(1)
2023–	Al-Safa		

International career
2018–	Saudi Arabia	1	(0)
- * Club domestic league appearances and goals as of 21:05, 12 August 2018 (UTC)

Abdulwahab Jaafer (Arabic: عبد الوهاب جعفر, born 15 September 1993) is a Saudi Arabian football player who plays as a winger for Al-Safa.
