= Abdulaziz Al-Nashi =

Saudi Arabian footballer

Personal information
- Full name: Abdulaziz Khalifah Al-Nashi
- Date of birth: August 7, 1986 (age 40)
- Place of birth: Al-Hasa
- Position: Midfielder

Youth career
- Al-Oyoon

Senior career*
Years	Team	Apps	(Gls)
2008–2014	Al-Oyon		
2014	→ Al-Sawab (loan)		
2014–2016	Al-Nahda		
2016–2017	Al-Ettifaq	15	(0)
2018	Al-Nojoom		
2018–2019	Al-Khaleej	36	(5)
2019–2021	Al-Hazem	31	(0)
2021–2022	Al-Sahel	32	(0)
2022–2023	Al-Qadsiah	9	(0)
2023–2024	Al-Taraji		
- * Club domestic league appearances and goals as of 9 September 2020

Abdulaziz Al-Nashi (Arabic: عبد العزيز الناشي; born 7 August 1986) is a Saudi Arabian footballer who currently plays as a midfielder.

== Career ==
On 8 August 2022, Al-Nashi joined First Division side Al-Qadsiah.

== Honours ==
Al-Hazem

- MS League: 2020–21
