= Dawod Al Saeed =

Saudi Arabian footballer

Dawood Al Saeed
Personal information
- Full name: Dawood Hussain Al Saeed
- Date of birth: March 28, 1991 (age 35)
- Place of birth: Saudi Arabia
- Height: 1.78 m (5 ft 10 in)
- Position: Goalkeeper

Youth career
- Al-Safa

Senior career*
Years	Team	Apps	(Gls)
2009–2012	Al-Safa		
2009	→ Al-Taraji (loan)		
2012–2016	Al-Qadsiah		
2016–2017	Al-Nahda		
2017–2023	Al-Hazem	74	(0)
2023–2024	Al-Safa		
- * Club domestic league appearances and goals as of 31 May 2023

Dawood Al Saeed (Arabic: داوود آل سعيد; born 28 March 1991) is a Saudi Arabian football player who currently plays as a goalkeeper.

In 2020 he became the subject of a TikTok Trend, which lead to him gaining notoriety in Saudi Arabia.

== Honours ==
Al-Safa

- Third Division: 2010–11

Al-Qadsiah

- First Division: 2014–15

Al-Hazem

- MS League: 2020–21
