= Fares Al-Ayyaf =

Saudi Arabian footballer

Personal information
- Full name: Fares Fahad Al-Ayyaf
- Date of birth: March 1, 1992 (age 34)
- Place of birth: Saudi Arabia
- Height: 1.74 m (5 ft 9 in)
- Position: Central midfielder

Senior career*
| Years | Team | Apps | (Gls) |
| 2014–2018 | Al-Raed | 71 | (1) |
| 2018–2020 | Al-Hazem | 27 | (1) |
| 2020–2022 | Al-Bukayriyah | | |

International career^{‡}
| 2019 | Saudi Arabia | 1 | (0) |
- * Club domestic league appearances and goals as of 17 May 2019 ‡ National team caps and goals as of 25 March 2019

Fares Al-Ayyaf (Arabic: فارس العياف; born 1 March 1992) is a Saudi footballer who plays as a central midfielder.
