= Mojahed Al-Munee =

Saudi Arabian footballer

Personal information
- Full name: Mojahed Mubarak Al-Munee
- Date of birth: 15 January 1996 (age 30)
- Place of birth: Saudi Arabia
- Height: 1.85 m (6 ft 1 in)
- Position: Forward

Team information
- Current team: Al-Muzahimiyyah
- Number: 20

Youth career
- Al-Hilal

Senior career*
Years	Team	Apps	(Gls)
2016–2019	Al-Hilal	7	(1)
2018–2019	→ Al-Hazem (loan)	12	(0)
2019–2020	Al-Tai	29	(4)
2020–2021	Al-Thoqbah	21	(4)
2021–2023	Al-Diriyah	39	(2)
2023–2024	Al-Taraji	12	(0)
2024	Al-Shaeib		
2024–2025	Arar		
2025–	Al-Muzahimiyyah		

International career
2017–2018	Saudi Arabia U23		
- * Club domestic league appearances and goals

Mojahed Al-Munee (Arabic: مجاهد المنيع; born 15 January 1996) is a Saudi professional footballer who plays as a forward for Al-Muzahimiyyah.

== Club career ==
Mojahed was a player in Al-Hilal youth system he was promoted in 2016 by Ramon Diaz. On 21 December 2016, Mojahed played his first match against Al-Batin which he was substituted in the 80th minute. On 31 December 2016, Mojahed started against Al-Taawoun, but in the 67th minute he was injured with cruciate ligament for six months, which made him end the season early.

On 3 July 2023, Al-Munee joined Al-Taraji. On 29 January 2024, Al-Munee joined Al-Shaeib. On 14 September 2024, Al-Munee joined Arar.

== Statistics ==
As of 15 July 2018

Club	Season	Saudi Premier League		Crown Prince Cup		Saudi Champions Cup		Saudi Super Cup		AFC Champions League		Total	
Club	Season	Apps	Goals	Apps	Goals	Apps	Goals	Apps	Goals	Apps	Goals	Apps	Goals
Al-Hilal
Al-Hilal	2016–17	2	0	0	0	1	0	0	0	0	0	3	0
Al-Hilal	2017–18	5	1	1	0	0	0	0	0	4	0	10	1
Career total		7	1	1	0	1	0	0	0	4	0	13	1
