= Muralha =

Brazilian footballer (born 1993)

Personal information
- Full name: Luiz Philipe Lima de Oliveira
- Date of birth: January 21, 1993 (age 33)
- Place of birth: Rio de Janeiro, Brazil
- Height: 1.73 m (5 ft 8 in)
- Position: Central midfielder

Youth career
- 2010–2012: Flamengo

Senior career*
Years	Team	Apps	(Gls)
2011–2017	Flamengo	28	(0)
2013	→ Portuguesa (loan)	1	(0)
2015	→ Bragantino (loan)	0	(0)
2015–2016	→ Luverdense (loan)	27	(1)
2016–2017	→ Pohang Steelers (loan)	53	(1)
2018	Seongnam	11	(3)
2018–2021	Al-Hazem	74	(2)
2021–2022	Al-Qadsiah	21	(0)
2022–2023	Al-Riyadh	31	(10)
2023–2024	Al-Arabi	32	(7)
2024–2025	Dibba Al Fujairah	18	(5)
2025–2026	Abha	31	(6)
2026–	Al Wehda	2	(0)

International career
2011	Brazil U-18	3	(0)
- * Club domestic league appearances and goals as of 25 August 2026

Luiz Philipe Lima de Oliveira (born January 21, 1993, in Rio de Janeiro), known as Muralha or Luiz Philipe Muralha, is a Brazilian football who plays as a centre midfielder for Saudi First Division club Al Wehda.

== Career ==
On 26 July 2021, Muralha joined Saudi FDL club Al-Qadsiah.

On 7 August 2022, Muralha joined Al-Riyadh. He helped the club earn promotion to the Pro League in his only season at the club.

On 24 May 2023, Muralha joined Al-Arabi.

On 14 August 2025, Muralha joined Abha on a free transfer.

=== Career statistics ===
(Correct As of 16 February 2017)

Appearances and goals by club, season and competition
Club	Season	League			Cup		Continental		State League		Total	
Club	Season	Division	Apps	Goals	Apps	Goals	Apps	Goals	Apps	Goals	Apps	Goals
Flamengo	2011	Série A	13	0	1	0	0	0	1	0	15	0
Flamengo	2012	Série A	7	0	0	0	6	0	9	0	22	0
Flamengo	Total		20	0	1	0	6	0	9	0	37	0
Portuguesa (loan)	2013	Série A	1	0	1	0	—		11	0	13	0
Flamengo	2014	Série A	8	0	1	0	6	0	12	0	27	0
Bragantino (loan)	2015	Série B	—		1	0	—		12	0	13	1
Luverdense (loan)	2015	Série B	21	1	—		—		—		21	1
Luverdense (loan)	2016	Série B	6	0	0	0	—		—		6	0
Luverdense (loan)	Total		27	1	0	0	0	0	0	0	27	1
Pohang Steelers (loan)	2016	K League 1	20	1	0	0	—		—		20	1
Pohang Steelers (loan)	2017	K League 1	33	0	0	0	—		—		33	0
Pohang Steelers (loan)	Total		53	1	0	0	0	0	0	0	53	1
Career total			109	2	4	0	12	0	44	0	170	2

according to combined sources on the Flamengo official website and Flaestatística.

== Honours ==
Flamengo

- Campeonato Carioca: 2011, 2014

Portuguesa

- Campeonato Paulista Série A2: 2013

Brazil U18

- Copa Internacional do Mediterrâneo: 2011
