= Malik Asselah =

Algerian footballer (born 1986)

Personal information
- Full name: Malik Asselah
- Date of birth: 8 July 1986 (age 40)
- Place of birth: Algiers, Algeria
- Position: Goalkeeper

Team information
- Current team: SV Südwest Ludwigshafen

Senior career*
Years	Team	Apps	(Gls)
2006–2010	NA Hussein Dey	103	(-)
2010–2014	JS Kabylie	81	(0)
2014–2016	CR Belouizdad	49	(0)
2016–2018	JS Kabylie	43	(0)
2018–2022	Al-Hazem	67	(0)
2022–2023	Al-Kholood	5	(0)
2024–	SV Südwest Ludwigshafen	2	(0)

International career^{‡}
2007	Algeria U23	1	(0)
2017	Algeria	3	(0)
- * Club domestic league appearances and goals as of 00:00, 19 October 2018 (EST) ‡ National team caps and goals as of 00:00, 29 January 2017 (EST)

Malik Asselah (born 8 July 1986) is an Algerian footballer who plays as a goalkeeper for the Algeria national football team.

== Personal ==
Born in Algiers, Asselah is originally from the village of Ighil Imoula in the Tizi Ouzou Province.

== Club career ==
A product of the NA Hussein Dey junior ranks, Asselah made his senior debut for the club in 2006.

At the end of the 2009–2010 season, he left NA Hussein Dey after they got relegated. He subsequently signed a one-year contract with JS Kabylie.

On 5 July 2022, Asselah joined Al-Kholood.

On 27 August 2024 Asselah joined SV Südwest Ludwigshafen.

== International career ==
On 31 December 2007 Asselah made his debut for the Algerian Under-23 National Team in a 1-0 friendly win over Saudi Arabia in Riyadh.

On 17 April 2008 he was called up to the Algerian A' National Team for an African Championship of Nations qualifier against Morocco but withdrew from the squad with an injury.

Asselah was called up to the senior Algeria squad for the 2017 Africa Cup of Nations qualifiers against Seychelles on 2 June 2016.

== Honours ==
- Won the Algerian Cup once with JS Kabylie in 2010–11
