= Alemão (footballer, born October 1990) =

Brazilian footballer

Personal information
- Full name: Fagner Ironi Daponte
- Date of birth: 18 October 1990 (age 36)
- Place of birth: Santo Ângelo, Brazil
- Height: 1.86 m (6 ft 1 in)
- Positions: Defender; right back

Team information
- Current team: Náutico
- Number: 4

Youth career
- 2008: Atlético Rondoniense
- 2008: Santo Ângelo

Senior career*
Years	Team	Apps	(Gls)
2009–2010	Francisco Beltrão		
2010	Videira		
2011	Tanabi	11	(0)
2011	Inter de Lages	11	(1)
2012	Hermann Aichinger	10	(0)
2012	Juventus–SC		
2013–2017	Hermann Aichinger	29	(0)
2013–2014	→ Chapecoense (loan)	16	(1)
2015	→ Operário–PR (loan)	9	(1)
2016	→ Brusque (loan)	16	(2)
2016	→ Avaí (loan)	30	(0)
2017–2018	Avaí	85	(7)
2018–2020	Al-Hazem	58	(10)
2020–2022	Avaí	74	(3)
2022–2024	Operário-PR	29	(0)
2025–	Náutico	2	(0)
2026–	→ Inter de Limeira (loan)	3	(0)
- * Club domestic league appearances and goals as of 9 November 2026

Fagner Ironi Daponte (born 18 October 1990), known as Alemão, is a Brazilian footballer who plays as defender for Inter de Limeira, on loan from Náutico.

== Career statistics ==
As of 9 August 2017

Club	Season	League			State League		Cup		Continental		Other		Total	
Club	Season	Division	Apps	Goals	Apps	Goals	Apps	Goals	Apps	Goals	Apps	Goals	Apps	Goals
Hermann Aichinger	2012	Catarinense	—		10	0	—		—		—		10	0
Hermann Aichinger	2013	Catarinense	—		15	0	—		—		—		15	0
Hermann Aichinger	2015	Catarinense	—		14	0	—		—		—		14	0
Hermann Aichinger	Subtotal		—		39	0	—		—		—		39	0
Chapecoense	2013	Série B	8	0	—		—		—		—		8	0
Chapecoense	2014	Série A	0	0	8	1	1	0	—		—		9	1
Chapecoense	Subtotal		8	0	8	1	1	0	—		—		17	1
Operário–PR	2015	Série D	9	1	—		—		—		—		9	1
Brusque	2016	Série D	—		16	2	—		—		—		16	2
Avaí	2016	Série B	29	0	—		1	0	—		—		30	0
Avaí	2017	Série A	16	0	18	3	2	0	—		2	0	38	3
Avaí	Subtotal		45	0	18	3	3	0	—		2	0	68	3
Career total			62	1	81	6	4	0	0	0	2	0	149	7

== Honours ==
Avaí

- Campeonato Catarinense: 2021
