= Saif Al-Qeshtah =

Saudi Arabian footballer

Personal information
- Full name: Saif Hussain Al-Qeshtah
- Date of birth: January 28, 1993 (age 33)
- Place of birth: Ta'if, Saudi Arabia
- Height: 1.82 m (6 ft 0 in)
- Position: Centre back

Team information
- Current team: Al-Anwar
- Number: 21

Youth career
- Wej

Senior career*
Years	Team	Apps	(Gls)
2014–2017	Wej		
2017–2020	Al-Hazem	64	(1)
2020–2022	Al-Ain	34	(0)
2022–2023	Al-Riyadh	4	(0)
2023–2025	Ohod	22	(0)
2025–	Al-Anwar	0	(0)

International career
2014	Saudi Arabia U23		
- * Club domestic league appearances and goals as of 31 May 2023

Saif Hussain Al-Qeshtah (Arabic: سيف حسين القشطة; born 28 January 1993) is a Saudi Arabian professional footballer who plays as a centre back for Al-Anwar.

== Career ==
Al-Qeshtah is an academy graduate of Wej and was promoted to the first team at the start of the 2014–15 season. He signed his first professional contract with Wej on 22 July 2016. Following Wej's relegation to the Second Division, Al-Qeshtah joined Al-Hazem. He played an important in Al-Hazem's promotion to the Pro League. On 14 July 2018, Al-Qeshtah renewed his contract with Al-Hazem for a further two years. On 8 October 2020, Al-Qeshtah joined Al-Ain on a free transfer following Al-Hazem's relegation. On 4 August 2022, Al-Qeshtah joined Al-Riyadh on a free transfer. On 15 July 2023, Al-Qeshtah joined Ohod. On 12 August 2025, Al-Qeshtah joined Al-Anwar.
