= Wesam Al-Sowayed =

Saudi Arabian footballer

Personal information
- Full name: Wesam Saleh Al-Sowayed
- Date of birth: November 29, 1987 (age 38)
- Place of birth: Jeddah, Saudi Arabia
- Height: 1.79 m (5 ft 10 in)
- Position: Left back

Youth career
- Al-Ittihad

Senior career*
Years	Team	Apps	(Gls)
2008–2010	Al-Ittihad	0	(0)
2009	→ Al-Ansar (loan)		
2011–2019	Al-Faisaly	126	(2)
2019–2020	Al-Hazem	11	(0)
2020–2021	Al-Kawkab	24	(0)
2021–2022	Al-Orobah	13	(0)
2022–2023	Al-Jubail		

International career^{‡}
2019–	Saudi Arabia	2	(0)
- * Club domestic league appearances and goals as of 16 May 2019 ‡ National team caps and goals as of 10 August 2019

Wesam Al-Sowayed (Arabic: وسام السويد; born 29 November 1987) is a Saudi Arabian professional footballer who plays as a left back. He has played for the Saudi Arabia national team.
