= Osama Al-Khalaf =

Saudi Arabian footballer

Personal information
- Full name: Osama Yousef Al-Khalaf
- Date of birth: December 26, 1996 (age 29)
- Place of birth: Al-Hasa, Saudi Arabia
- Height: 1.76 m (5 ft 9 in)
- Positions: Midfielder; right back

Team information
- Current team: Al-Adalah (on loan from Neom)
- Number: 8

Senior career*
Years	Team	Apps	(Gls)
2015–2017	Hajer	29	(0)
2017–2019	Al-Ettifaq	24	(0)
2019	→ Al-Hazem (loan)	13	(1)
2019–2020	Al-Hazem	26	(3)
2020–2022	Al-Nassr	14	(0)
2021–2022	→ Al-Tai (loan)	12	(0)
2022	→ Al-Hazem (loan)	10	(1)
2022–2024	Al-Fayha	30	(1)
2024–	Neom	2	(0)
2025	→ Al-Orobah (loan)	11	(0)
2025–	→ Al-Adalah (loan)	0	(0)

International career^{‡}
2016–2018	Saudi Arabia U23		
2019	Saudi Arabia	2	(0)
- * Club domestic league appearances and goals as of 25 April 2024 ‡ National team caps and goals as of 25 March 2019

Osama Yousef Al-Khalaf (Arabic: أسامه يوسف الخلف; born December 26, 1996) is a Saudi professional footballer who plays as a midfielder or a right back for Al-Adalah on loan from Neom.

== Career ==
On 20 July 2022, Al-Khalaf joined Al-Fayha on a two-year deal.

On 2 July 2024, Al-Khalaf joined Saudi First Division League club Neom on a free transfer. On 1 February 2025, Al-Khalaf joined Al-Orobah on loan. On 10 September 2025, Al-Khalaf joined Al-Adalah on loan.

== Honours ==
Al-Nassr

- Saudi Super Cup: 2020
