= Rodolfo (footballer, born May 1993) =

Brazilian footballer

Personal information
- Full name: Rodolfo de Almeida Guimarães
- Date of birth: 3 May 1993 (age 33)
- Place of birth: Mesquita, Brazil
- Height: 1.73 m (5 ft 8 in)
- Position: Attacking midfielder

Team information
- Current team: Brasiliense
- Number: 9

Youth career
- 2008–2013: Madureira
- 2010–2012: → Internacional (loan)
- 2012–2013: → Flamengo (loan)

Senior career*
| Years | Team | Apps | (Gls) |
| 2013–2017 | Flamengo | 0 | (0) |
| 2014 | → Ponte Preta (loan) | 11 | (0) |
| 2015 | → Coritiba (loan) | 3 | (0) |
| 2016 | → Audax (loan) | 8 | (2) |
| 2016 | → Oeste (loan) | 20 | (1) |
| 2017 | Mirassol | 15 | (2) |
| 2017–2018 | CRB | 10 | (0) |
| 2018–2021 | Mirassol | 17 | (0) |
| 2018 | → São Bento (loan) | 7 | (1) |
| 2018–2019 | → Al-Hazem (loan) | 24 | (5) |
| 2019 | → São Bento (loan) | 23 | (2) |
| 2020 | → Jeonnam Dragons (loan) | 0 | (0) |
| 2022 | Portuguesa | 8 | (0) |
| 2022–2023 | Cheonan City FC | 15 | (3) |
| 2023 | CSA | 7 | (0) |
| 2024 | Noroeste | 16 | (0) |
| 2024– | Brasiliense | 2 | (0) |
- * Club domestic league appearances and goals as of 28 June 2023

Rodolfo de Almeida Guimarães (born 3 May 1993), simply known as Rodolfo, is a Brazilian footballer who plays as an attacking midfielder for Brasiliense.

== Club career ==
Born in Mesquita, Rio de Janeiro, Rodolfo joined Flamengo's youth setup in 2012, initially on loan from Madureira, after a stint at Internacional. He was promoted to the former's main squad in 2013 by manager Dorival Júnior.

Rodolfo was a starter for Fla during 2013 and 2014 Campeonato Carioca, but made no appearances for the club in Série A. On 28 April 2014 he was loaned to Ponte Preta until the end of the year.

Rodolfo made his professional debut on 10 May, starting in a 2–1 home win against ABC for the Série B championship. He finished the campaign with 11 appearances, and subsequently returned to his parent club.

On 5 January 2015 Rodolfo joined Coritiba, also in a temporary deal.
