= 2019–20 Al-Faisaly FC season =

Al-Faisaly
2019–20 season
- President: Fahd Al-Medlej
- Manager: Péricles Chamusca
- Stadium: Al Majma'ah Sports City
- SPL: 5th
- King Cup: Round of 16
- Top goalscorer: League: Youssef El Jebli (9); All: Youssef El Jebli (10)
- Highest home attendance: 5,600 vs Al-Adalah (28 September 2019)
- Lowest home attendance: 3,664 vs Al-Raed (11 January 2020)
- Average home league attendance: 4,401
Home colours	Away colours	Third colours
- All statistics correct as of 9 September 2020.

The 2019–20 season was Al-Faisaly's 11th non-consecutive season in the Pro League and their 66th season in existence. The club participated in the Pro League and the King Cup.

The season covered the period from 1 July 2019 to 9 September 2020.

== Players ==
=== Squad information ===
As of 1 February 2020

Note: Flags indicate national team as defined under FIFA eligibility rules; some limited exceptions apply. Players may hold more than one non-FIFA nationality.

No.	Pos.	Nation	Player
2	DF	KSA	Abdullah Al-Hassan
3	DF	BRA	Igor Rossi
4	DF	BRA	Raphael Silva
5	MF	KSA	Hussain Al Quraish
7	MF	CUW	Roly Bonevacia
9	FW	BRA	William Alves
10	MF	KSA	Hussain Al-Qahtani
11	MF	BRA	Guilherme
12	DF	KSA	Khalid Al-Ghamdi
13	DF	KSA	Ali Meadi
15	FW	KSA	Ramzi Solan
17	MF	KSA	Ahmed Ashraf (on loan from Al-Hilal)

No.	Pos.	Nation	Player
18	DF	KSA	Mohammed Qassem
21	DF	KSA	Ageel Balghaith
26	GK	KSA	Mustafa Malayekah
28	GK	KSA	Ahmed Al-Kassar
34	MF	NED	Youssef El Jebli
47	MF	KSA	Mustafa Bassas
55	MF	KSA	Moshari Al-Thamali
70	MF	KSA	Ahmed Al-Anzi
77	MF	KSA	Khalid Kaabi
80	FW	KSA	Mohammed Al-Saiari (on loan from Al-Wehda)
87	MF	KSA	Meshal Al-Sebyani
88	MF	TRI	Khaleem Hyland

=== Out on loan ===
Note: Flags indicate national team as defined under FIFA eligibility rules; some limited exceptions apply. Players may hold more than one non-FIFA nationality.

No.	Pos.	Nation	Player
5	DF	KSA	Hussein Hawsawi (at Al-Taqadom until 30 June 2020)
20	MF	KSA	Abdullah Al-Qahtani (at Abha until 30 June 2020)
23	DF	KSA	Awadh Khrees (at Al-Adalah until 30 June 2020)

No.	Pos.	Nation	Player
—	MF	KSA	Mohammed Al-Thani (at Al-Ittihad until 30 June 2020)
—	MF	KSA	Bader Bashir (at Al-Qadsiah until 30 June 2020)

== Transfers and loans ==
=== Transfers in ===
Entry date	Position	No.	Player	From club	Fee	Ref.
10 May 2019	MF	7	(Curaçao) Roly Bonevacia	(Australia) Western Sydney Wanderers	Free	
30 May 2019	DF	4	(Brazil) Raphael Silva	(Portugal) Boavista	Free	
26 June 2019	MF	14	(Saudi Arabia) Ibrahim Ghaleb	(Saudi Arabia) Al-Nassr	Free	
1 July 2019	DF	12	(Saudi Arabia) Khalid Al-Ghamdi	(Saudi Arabia) Al-Nassr	Free	
1 July 2019	FW	9	(Brazil) William Alves	(Portugal) Chaves	Free	
10 July 2019	DF	13	(Saudi Arabia) Ali Meadi	(Saudi Arabia) Damac	Undisclosed	
11 July 2019	MF	77	(Saudi Arabia) Khalid Kaabi	(Saudi Arabia) Al-Shabab	Free	
14 July 2019	MF	55	(Saudi Arabia) Moshari Al-Thamali	(Saudi Arabia) Al-Shabab	Free	
1 August 2019	DF	18	(Saudi Arabia) Mohammed Qassem	(Saudi Arabia) Al-Ittihad	Free	
22 August 2019	MF	5	(Saudi Arabia) Hussain Al Quraish	(Saudi Arabia) Al-Safa	Free	
23 August 2019	MF	22	(Saudi Arabia) Abdullaziz Al-Dawsari	Unattached	Free	
23 August 2019	MF	34	(Netherlands) Youssef El Jebli	(Netherlands) De Graafschap	Undisclosed	
13 January 2020	FW	11	(Brazil) Guilherme	(Brazil) Grêmio	$2,225,000	
28 January 2020	MF	47	(Saudi Arabia) Mustafa Bassas	(Saudi Arabia) Al-Ahli	Free	

=== Loans in ===
Start date	End date	Position	No.	Player	From club	Fee	Ref.
23 August 2019	End of season	MF	17	(Saudi Arabia) Ahmed Ashraf	(Saudi Arabia) Al-Hilal	$215,000	
31 January 2020	End of season	FW	80	(Saudi Arabia) Mohammed Al-Saiari	(Saudi Arabia) Al-Wehda	None	

=== Transfers out ===
Exit date	Position	No.	Player	To club	Fee	Ref.
30 April 2019	MF	47	(Saudi Arabia) Sultan Mendash	(Saudi Arabia) Al-Ahli	Free	
12 May 2019	DF	27	(Saudi Arabia) Hamdan Al-Shamrani	(Saudi Arabia) Al-Ittihad	$3,200,000	
22 May 2019	MF	9	(Brazil) Rogerinho	(Saudi Arabia) Al-Ettifaq	$1,000,000	
25 June 2019	FW	19	(Saudi Arabia) Mohammed Majrashi	(Saudi Arabia) Al-Fateh	Free	
26 June 2019	MF	6	(Saudi Arabia) Omar Abdulaziz	(Saudi Arabia) Al-Kawkab	Free	
27 June 2019	DF	2	(Saudi Arabia) Yazeed Al-Bakr	(Saudi Arabia) Al-Ahli	$2,135,000	
12 July 2019	DF	7	(Saudi Arabia) Wesam Al-Sowayed	(Saudi Arabia) Al-Hazem	Free	
12 July 2019	MF	80	(Saudi Arabia) Riyadh Sharahili	(Saudi Arabia) Al-Adalah	Free	
19 July 2019	MF	23	(Saudi Arabia) Mohammed Abousaban	(Saudi Arabia) Damac	Free	
6 August 2019	MF	40	(Yemen) Ahmed Ba Saeed	(Saudi Arabia) Al-Khaleej	Free	
5 September 2019	DF	66	(Croatia) Ante Puljić	(Romania) Dinamo București	Free	
1 January 2020	MF	8	(Brazil) Luisinho	(Saudi Arabia) Al-Wehda	Undisclosed	
10 January 2020	GK	36	(Saudi Arabia) Raghid Al-Najjar	(Saudi Arabia) Al-Wehda	Undisclosed	
29 January 2020	FW	–	(Colombia) Diego Calderón	(Iraq) Al-Shorta	Free	
31 January 2020	MF	22	(Saudi Arabia) Abdullaziz Al-Dawsari	(Saudi Arabia) Al-Nassr	$267,000	

=== Loans out ===
Start date	End date	Position	No.	Player	To club	Fee	Ref.
15 July 2019	End of season	DF	5	(Saudi Arabia) Hussein Hawsawi	(Saudi Arabia) Al-Taqadom	None	
16 July 2019	End of season	FW	18	(Colombia) Diego Calderón	Al-Kuwait	None	
25 July 2019	End of season	MF	–	(Saudi Arabia) Bader Bashir	(Saudi Arabia) Al-Qadsiah	None	
2 January 2020	End of season	MF	20	(Saudi Arabia) Abdullah Al-Qahtani	(Saudi Arabia) Abha	None	
7 January 2020	End of season	MF	11	(Saudi Arabia) Mohammed Al-Thani	(Saudi Arabia) Al-Ittihad	None	
13 January 2020	End of season	DF	23	(Saudi Arabia) Awadh Khrees	(Saudi Arabia) Al-Adalah	None	

== Pre-season ==
20 July 2019 Friendly	Al-Faisaly (Saudi Arabia)	2–3	(Hungary) Mezőkövesdi	Krško, Slovenia
11:30 CEST	Alves 7' (pen.); Solan 87'		34'; 45+1'; 90+1'	Stadium: Matija Gubec Stadium

24 July 2019 Friendly	Al-Faisaly (Saudi Arabia)	3–2	(Hungary) Budafoki	Radomlje, Slovenia
18:00 CEST	Luisinho 19', 46' (pen.); Al-Thani 50'		Khiesz; Veselinov	Stadium: Domžale Sports Park

26 July 2019 Friendly	Al-Faisaly (Saudi Arabia)	0–0	(Croatia) Rudeš	Slovenia
18:00 CEST		Report

31 July 2019 Friendly	Al-Faisaly (Saudi Arabia)	3–0	(Croatia) Varaždin	Varaždin, Croatia
18:00 CEST	Alves 9'; Luisinho 33' (pen.); Khrees 62'	Report		Stadium: Stadion Varteks

4 August 2019 Friendly	Al-Faisaly (Saudi Arabia)	5–1	(Greece) Apollon Larissa	Slovenia
17:00 CEST	Solan 28', 65', 82'; Al-Qahtani 51'; Al-Enezi 61'	Report	Goal

5 August 2019 Friendly	Al-Faisaly (Saudi Arabia)	1–3	(Slovenia) Olimpija Ljubljana	Ljubljana, Slovenia
17:00 CEST	Alves 87'	Report		Stadium: Stožice Stadium

8 August 2019 Friendly	Al-Faisaly (Saudi Arabia)	2–0	(Saudi Arabia) Al-Mujazzal	Harmah, Saudi Arabia
19:30 AST		Report		Stadium: Al-Faisaly Club Stadium

16 August 2019 Friendly	Al-Faisaly (Saudi Arabia)	3–1	(Saudi Arabia) Al-Raed	Al Zulfi, Saudi Arabia
19:20 AST		Report		Stadium: Al Zulfi Club Stadium

== Competitions ==
=== Overall ===
Competition	Started round	Final position / round	First match	Last match
Pro League	—	5th	24 August 2019	9 September 2020
King Cup	Round of 64	Round of 16	11 November 2019	3 January 2020

Updated to match played 9 September 2020
Source: Competitions

=== Overview ===
Competition	Record							
Competition	G	W	D	L	GF	GA	GD	Win %
Pro League	30	14	6	10	41	36	+5	46.67
King Cup	3	2	1	0	7	3	+4	66.67
Total	33	16	7	10	48	39	+9	48.48

Updated to match played 9 September 2020
Source: Competitions

=== Pro League ===
==== League table ====
Pos	Team	Pld	W	D	L	GF	GA	GD	Pts	Qualification or relegation
3	Al-Ahli	30	15	5	10	49	36	+13	50	Qualification for AFC Champions League group stage
4	Al-Wehda	30	16	1	13	45	40	+5	49	Qualification for AFC Champions League play-off round
5	Al-Faisaly	30	14	6	10	41	36	+5	48	
6	Al-Raed	30	13	7	10	41	50	−9	46	
7	Al-Shabab	30	12	7	11	38	37	+1	43	

Updated to match(es) played on 9 September 2020. Source: spl.com
Rules for classification: 1) Points; 2) Head-to-head points; 3) Head-to-head goal difference; 4) Total goal difference; 5) Total goals scored; 6) Fair-play points (Note: Head-to-head record is used only after all the matches between the teams in question have been played).

==== Results summary ====
Overall								Home						Away					
Pld	W	D	L	GF	GA	GD	Pts	W	D	L	GF	GA	GD	W	D	L	GF	GA	GD
30	14	6	10	41	36	+5	48	10	3	2	26	15	+11	4	3	8	15	21	−6

Last updated: 9 September 2020.

==== Results by round ====
Round	1	2	3	4	5	6	7	8	9	10	11	12	13	14	15	16	17	18	19	20	21	22	23	24	25	26	27	28	29	30
Ground	H	A	H	A	H	A	H	A	H	A	A	H	A	H	A	A	H	A	H	A	H	A	H	A	H	H	A	H	A	H
Result	D	D	W	W	W	L	W	L	W	L	W	D	L	L	W	L	W	D	L	W	W	D	W	L	W	D	L	W	L	W
Position	10	10	4	2	2	4	4	6	4	6	5	6	8	9	7	8	6	7	7	5	5	5	5	5	4	5	5	5	6	5

Updated to match(es) played on 9 September 2020. Source:
A = Away; H = Home; W = Win; D = Draw; L = Loss

==== Matches ====
All times are local, AST (UTC+3).

Win Draw Loss Postponed

24 August 2019 1	Al-Faisaly	0–0	Al-Fayha	Al Majma'ah
19:05	Silva (yellow card) 15'; Bonevacia (yellow card) 40'; Kaabi (yellow card) 58'; Qassem (yellow card) 90+1'	Report	Fernández (yellow card) 42'; Assis (yellow card) 82'	Stadium: Al Majma'ah Sports City; Attendance: 3,945; Referee: Matthew Conger (New Zealand)

30 August 2019 2	Al-Shabab	0–0	Al-Faisaly	Riyadh
18:55	Sebá (yellow card) 76'; Salem (yellow card) 90+5'	Report	Malayekah (yellow card) 71'; Ashraf (red card) 85'	Stadium: King Fahd International Stadium; Attendance: 3,976; Referee: Viktor Kassai (Hungary)

15 September 2019 3	Al-Faisaly	3–2	Al-Fateh	Al Majma'ah
20:10	Luisinho (yellow card) 20'; El Jebli 52'; Bonevacia 62', 68'	Report	Al-Zaqaan 21'; Buhimed (yellow card) 54' (yellow-red card) 90+3'; Majrashi 63'	Stadium: Al Majma'ah Sports City; Attendance: 4,450; Referee: Daniel Stefanski (Poland)

21 September 2019 4	Al-Ettifaq	0–1	Al-Faisaly	Dammam
18:15		Report	Al-Khaibari 46' (o.g.); Qassem (yellow card) 65'; Hyland (yellow card) 71'	Stadium: Prince Mohamed bin Fahd Stadium; Attendance: 8,213; Referee: Bakary Gassama (Gambia)

28 September 2019 5	Al-Faisaly	3–1	Al-Adalah	Al Majma'ah
18:30	Rossi 47'; El Jebli (yellow card) 50'; William 88'; Luisinho 90+4'	Report	Biteghé (yellow card) 24'; Al-Yousef 33'; Al-Muwallad (yellow card) 90+3'	Stadium: Al Majma'ah Sports City; Attendance: 5,600; Referee: Ovidiu Hațegan (Romania)

20 October 2019 7	Al-Faisaly	1–0	Al-Hazem	Al Majma'ah
20:00	Al-Ghamdi 58', (yellow card) 67'; Solan (yellow card) 90+4'	Report	Al-Ayyaf (yellow card) 47'	Stadium: Al Majma'ah Sports City; Attendance: 4,506; Referee: Fábio Veríssimo (Portugal)

26 October 2019 8	Al-Taawoun	2–1	Al-Faisaly	Buraidah
18:05	Tawamba 44'; Amissi (yellow card) 49'; Rossi 63' (o.g.); Al-Zubaidi (yellow card) 82'	Report	Silva (yellow card) 60'; Rossi 80'	Stadium: King Abdullah Sport City Stadium; Attendance: 2,109; Referee: Ivan Kružliak (Slovakia)

1 November 2019 9	Al-Faisaly	2–0	Damac	Al Majma'ah
17:55	Luisinho 15'; Hyland (yellow card) 25'; Al-Ghamdi 57'	Report	Al-Jizani (yellow card) 36'; Al-Dossari (yellow card) 43'; Fellipe (yellow card) 51'; Al-Najei (yellow card) 64'; Al-Shahrani (yellow card) 90+4'	Stadium: Al Majma'ah Sports City; Attendance: 4,229; Referee: Anastasios Sidiropoulos (Greece)

6 November 2019 6	Al-Nassr	2–0	Al-Faisaly	Riyadh
19:55	Hamdallah 11'; Giuliano 28'; Al-Khaibari (yellow card) 43'; Hawsawi (yellow card) 71'	Report	Malayekah (yellow card) 39'; Hyland (yellow card) 59'	Stadium: Prince Faisal bin Fahd Stadium; Attendance: 11,718; Referee: Antonio Mateu Lahoz (Spain)

23 November 2019 10	Al-Ahli	3–1	Al-Faisaly	Jeddah
19:40	Djaniny 27', 90+5'; Hindi 45+6'; Souza (yellow card) 55'	Report	Qassem 90+4'	Stadium: King Abdullah Sports City; Attendance: 7,964; Referee: Matej Jug (Slovenia)

14 December 2019 11	Al-Ittihad	1–2	Al-Faisaly	Jeddah
19:45	Al-Shamrani (yellow card) 41' (yellow-red card) 74', (goal) 50'; Al-Malki (yellow card) 90'	Report	Luisinho (yellow card) 31'; William 43'; Hyland (yellow card) 55'; Silva (yellow card) 84'; Al-Ghamdi 85'	Stadium: King Abdullah Sports City; Attendance: 8,452; Referee: Pol van Boekel (Netherlands)

27 December 2019 13	Al-Wehda	1–0	Al-Faisaly	Mecca
19:50	Al-Qarni (yellow card) 39'; Botía (yellow card) 45'; Al-Shamlan 76', (yellow card) 90+3'; Al-Zori (yellow card) 83'; Al-Jadaani (yellow card) 90'	Report	Silva (yellow card) 49'; Al-Qahtani (yellow card) 73'	Stadium: King Abdul Aziz Stadium; Attendance: 5,411; Referee: Viktor Kassai (Hungary)

11 January 2020 14	Al-Faisaly	0–1	Al-Raed	Al Majma'ah
18:05	Ashraf (yellow card) 28'	Report	Daoudi 3'; Pérez (yellow card) 90+3'	Stadium: Al Majma'ah Sports City; Attendance: 3,664; Referee: Mohammed Al-Hoaish

20 January 2020 12	Al-Faisaly	2–2	Al-Hilal	Al Majma'ah
18:10	Hyland 55', 90+2'; Silva (yellow card) 74'; Al-Ghamdi (yellow card) 86'	Report	Giovinco 47'; Kurdi (yellow card) 55'; Carlos Eduardo 88' (pen.)	Stadium: Al Majma'ah Sports City; Attendance: 4,710; Referee: Andris Treimanis (Latvia)

25 January 2020 15	Abha	0–1	Al-Faisaly	Abha
15:55	Barnawi (yellow card) 68' (yellow-red card) 87'	Report	Silva 56'; Qassem (yellow card) 78'	Stadium: Prince Sultan bin Abdul Aziz Stadium; Attendance: 581; Referee: Tamás Bognár (Hungary)

1 February 2020 16	Al-Fayha	2–1	Al-Faisaly	Al Majma'ah
20:15	Nasser (yellow card) 24'; Villanueva 39'; Al-Barakah (yellow card) 55'; Al-Qahtani 90+1'	Report	El Jebli 36'; Silva (yellow card) 44'; Al-Ghamdi (yellow card) 70'	Stadium: Al Majma'ah Sports City; Attendance: 4,317; Referee: Nick Waldron (New Zealand)

7 February 2020 17	Al-Faisaly	2–1	Al-Shabab	Al Majma'ah
20:20	Malayekah (yellow card) 45'; Rossi (yellow card) 45+4', (goal) 57'; Silva (yellow card) 72'; Hyland (yellow card) 78'; El Jebli 89' (pen.)	Report	Al-Sulayhem 44'; Al-Shamekh (yellow card) 52'; Al Omran (yellow card) 75'	Stadium: Al Majma'ah Sports City; Attendance: 4,434; Referee: Dennis Higler (Netherlands)

15 February 2020 18	Al-Fateh	2–2	Al-Faisaly	Al-Hasa
18:10	Wikheim 24'; Al-Fuhaid (yellow card) 27'; Koval (yellow card) 65'; Bendebka 85', (yellow card) 86'; Saâdane (yellow card) 87'; Lajami (yellow card) 90+4'; Buhimed (yellow card) 90+7'	Report	Al-Qahtani (yellow card) 53'; Al-Saiari (yellow card) 55' (yellow-red card) 90+7'; El Jebli 66'; Malayekah 90+5'; Al-Kassar (yellow card) 90+6'	Stadium: Prince Abdullah bin Jalawi Stadium; Attendance: 13,091; Referee: Sultan Al-Harbi

21 February 2020 19	Al-Faisaly	1–2	Al-Ettifaq	Al Majma'ah
18:30	Guilherme (yellow card) 12'; Qassem (yellow card) 36'; Kaabi 63'; Hyland (yellow card) 82'; Al-Hassan (yellow card) 83'	Report	Azaro 57'; Al-Robeai 65', (yellow card) 90+5'	Stadium: Al Majma'ah Sports City; Attendance: 4,072; Referee: Bakary Gassama (Gambia)

28 February 2020 20	Al-Adalah	0–2	Al-Faisaly	Al-Hasa
18:20	Ogu (yellow card) 55'; Cissé (yellow card) 59'; Khrees (yellow card) 65' (yellow-red card) 71'; Traoré (yellow card) 90+5'	Report	Hyland 18'; Al-Saiari (red card) 77'; El Jebli 90+16'	Stadium: Prince Abdullah bin Jalawi Stadium; Attendance: 13,147; Referee: Ivan Bebek (Croatia)

7 March 2020 21	Al-Faisaly	3–2	Al-Nassr	Al Majma'ah
18:40	Rossi 15', (yellow card) 27'; Guilherme 28', 63'; Kaabi (yellow card) 86'; Hyland (yellow card) 90+3'	Report	Petros 7', (yellow card) 43'; Giuliano 30'; Al-Obaid (yellow card) 59'	Stadium: Al Majma'ah Sports City; Attendance: 0 (Note: Matches from 7 March and onwards will be played behind closed doors due to concerns over the coronavirus outbreak.); Referee: Danny Makkelie (Netherlands)

12 March 2020 22	Al-Hazem	2–2	Al-Faisaly	Ar Rass
20:40	Alemão 34' (pen.); Al-Khalaf 49'; Al-Qeshtah (yellow card) 55'	Report	Al-Ghamdi (yellow card) 32'; Qassem (yellow card) 40'; El Jebli 44'; Al-Saiari 68'; Bonevacia (yellow card) 82'	Stadium: Al-Hazem Club Stadium; Attendance: 0 Referee: István Kovács (Romania)

4 August 2020 23	Al-Faisaly	2–1	Al-Taawoun	Al Majma'ah
20:45	Ashraf 9'; Al-Qahtani (yellow card) 54'; Guilherme 70'; Hyland (yellow card) 73'; Al-Hassan (yellow card) 83'	Report	Amissi 63'; Al-Nabit (yellow card) 90+4'; Al-Absi (yellow card) 90+5'	Stadium: Al Majma'ah Sports City; Attendance: 0 Referee: Faisal Al-Blwi

9 August 2020 24	Damac	2–1	Al-Faisaly	Abha
19:15	Zelaya 27', 55'; Zeghba (yellow card) 90+2'	Report	El Jebli 81' (pen.); Al-Ghamdi (yellow card) 88'	Stadium: Prince Sultan bin Abdul Aziz Stadium; Attendance: 0 Referee: Sultan Al-Harbi

15 August 2020 25	Al-Faisaly	2–0	Al-Ahli	Al Majma'ah
19:10	El Jebli 27' (pen.); Hyland (yellow card) 66'; Kaabi 73'	Report	Al-Harbi (yellow card) 56'; Hindi (yellow card) 82'	Stadium: Al Majma'ah Sports City; Attendance: 0 Referee: Gediminas Mažeika (Lithuania)

19 August 2020 26	Al-Faisaly	1–1	Al-Ittihad	Al Majma'ah
19:05	El Jebli 44' (pen.); Hyland (yellow card) 88'	Report	Al-Shamrani 66'; Al-Muwallad (yellow card) 68'	Stadium: Al Majma'ah Sports City; Attendance: 0 Referee: Aleksei Kulbakov (Belarus)

25 August 2020 27	Al-Hilal	2–0	Al-Faisaly	Riyadh
19:00	Carrillo (yellow card) 48'; Giovinco (yellow card) 67'; Al-Breik (yellow card) 69'; Gomis 82'; Kharbin 90+6'	Report	Silva (yellow card) 62'	Stadium: King Saud University Stadium; Attendance: 0 Referee: Néstor Pitana (Argentina)

30 August 2020 28	Al-Faisaly	2–1	Al-Wehda	Al Majma'ah
18:55	Ashraf 29'; Guilherme 66'; Malayekah (yellow card) 78'; Al-Sebyani (yellow card) 81'	Report	Niakaté (yellow card) 56'; Luisinho 79' (pen.); Al-Qahtani (yellow card) 87'	Stadium: Al Majma'ah Sports City; Attendance: 0 Referee: João Pinheiro (Portugal)

4 September 2020 29	Al-Raed	2–1	Al-Faisaly	Buraidah
20:35	Fouzair 15' (pen.); Daoudi (red card) 45+5'; Al-Amri (yellow card) 45+11'; Al-Dossari (yellow card) 89'; Djoum 90+1'; Doukha (yellow card) 90+7'	Report	Guilherme 22' (pen.), (yellow card) 24'; Hyland (yellow card) 45+5'; El Jebli (yellow card) 60'; Meadi (yellow card) 88'	Stadium: King Abdullah Sport City Stadium; Attendance: 0 Referee: Andrés Cunha (Uruguay)

9 September 2020 30	Al-Faisaly	2–1	Abha	Al Majma'ah
20:35	William 23'; Silva 52'; Hyland (yellow card) 84'	Report	Aouadhi 70' (pen.)	Stadium: Al Majma'ah Sports City; Attendance: 0 Referee: Mohammed Al-Hoaish

=== King Cup ===
All times are local, AST (UTC+3).

11 November 2019 Round of 64	Wej	0–3	Al-Faisaly	Mecca
18:20	Traoré (yellow card) 67'; Al-Budair (yellow card) 78'; Hawsawi (yellow card) 80'	Report	Luisinho 14'; El Jebli 54'; Qassem (yellow card) 69'; Khrees 85'	Stadium: King Abdul Aziz Stadium; Referee: Faisal Al-Blwi

4 December 2019 Round of 32	Jeddah	1–2	Al-Faisaly	Jeddah
18:20	Sory (yellow card) 60'; Al-Muwallad (yellow card) 70', (goal) 90+3'; Al-Safri (yellow card) 80'	Report	Al-Ghamdi (yellow card) 2'; Luisinho 44'; William 53'	Stadium: King Abdullah Sports City Reserve Stadium; Referee: Ahmed Al-Remeikhany

3 January 2020 Round of 16	Al-Faisaly	2–2 (5–6 p)	Al-Hilal	Al Majma'ah
19:50	Bonevacia 29' (pen.); Qassem 73'; Hyland (yellow card) 89'; Rossi (yellow card) 90'; Malayekah (yellow card) 90+5'; Al-Dawsari (yellow card) 101'	Report	Al-Breik 19'; Jahfali (yellow card) 41'; Al-Shehri 63'; Kanno (yellow card) 70'; Gomis (yellow card) 114'	Stadium: Al Majma'ah Sports City; Referee: Ivan Bebek (Croatia)
	Penalties
	Hyland (penalty scored); Silva (penalty scored); William (penalty scored); Al-Dawsari (penalty scored); Rossi (penalty scored); Qassem (penalty missed)		(penalty scored) Carrillo; (penalty scored) Al-Breik; (penalty scored) Al-Dawsari; (penalty scored) Gomis; (penalty scored) Al-Mayouf; (penalty scored) Al-Abed

== Statistics ==
=== Appearances ===
Last updated on 9 September 2020.

No.	Pos	Nat	Player	Total		Pro League		King Cup	
No.	Pos	Nat	Player	Apps	Goals	Apps	Goals	Apps	Goals
Goalkeepers
1	GK	(Saudi Arabia) KSA	Sultan Al-Qahtani	0	0	0	0	0	0
26	GK	(Saudi Arabia) KSA	Mustafa Malayekah	30	1	28	1	2	0
28	GK	(Saudi Arabia) KSA	Ahmed Al-Kassar	4	0	2	0	1+1	0
Defenders
2	DF	(Saudi Arabia) KSA	Abdullah Al-Hassan	6	0	5+1	0	0	0
3	DF	(Brazil) BRA	Igor Rossi	33	4	30	4	3	0
4	DF	(Brazil) BRA	Raphael Silva	30	2	28	2	2	0
12	DF	(Saudi Arabia) KSA	Khalid Al-Ghamdi	25	3	22+1	3	2	0
13	DF	(Saudi Arabia) KSA	Ali Meadi	5	0	1+4	0	0	0
18	DF	(Saudi Arabia) KSA	Mohammed Qassem	32	2	29	1	3	1
21	DF	(Saudi Arabia) KSA	Ageel Balghaith	14	0	2+10	0	1+1	0
66	DF	(Saudi Arabia) KSA	Mohammed Al-Nukhylan	1	0	0+1	0	0	0
Midfielders
5	MF	(Saudi Arabia) KSA	Hussain Al Quraish	7	0	1+5	0	1	0
7	MF	(Curaçao) CUW	Roly Bonevacia	24	3	20+2	2	2	1
10	MF	(Saudi Arabia) KSA	Hussain Al-Qahtani	26	0	19+4	0	2+1	0
11	MF	(Brazil) BRA	Guilherme	17	5	14+3	5	0	0
17	MF	(Saudi Arabia) KSA	Ahmed Ashraf	22	2	11+8	2	3	0
34	MF	(Netherlands) NED	Youssef El Jebli	32	10	27+2	9	3	1
47	MF	(Saudi Arabia) KSA	Mustafa Bassas	7	0	2+5	0	0	0
55	MF	(Saudi Arabia) KSA	Moshari Al-Thamali	1	0	1	0	0	0
70	MF	(Saudi Arabia) KSA	Ahmed Al-Anzi	7	0	1+4	0	0+2	0
77	MF	(Saudi Arabia) KSA	Khalid Kaabi	26	2	14+11	2	0+1	0
87	MF	(Saudi Arabia) KSA	Meshal Al-Sebyani	2	0	1+1	0	0	0
88	MF	(Trinidad and Tobago) TRI	Khaleem Hyland	26	3	25	3	1	0
Forwards
9	FW	(Brazil) BRA	William Alves	33	4	27+3	3	3	1
15	FW	(Saudi Arabia) KSA	Ramzi Solan	13	0	0+11	0	0+2	0
80	FW	(Saudi Arabia) KSA	Mohammed Al-Saiari	6	1	2+4	1	0	0
Players sent out on loan this season
11	MF	(Saudi Arabia) KSA	Mohammed Al-Thani	0	0	0	0	0	0
23	DF	(Saudi Arabia) KSA	Awadh Khrees	5	1	3+1	0	1	1
Player who made an appearance this season but have left the club
8	MF	(Brazil) BRA	Luisinho	14	4	12	2	2	2
22	MF	(Saudi Arabia) KSA	Abdullaziz Al-Dawsari	13	0	3+7	0	1+2	0

=== Goalscorers ===
Rank	No.	Pos	Nat	Name	Pro League	King Cup	Total
1	34	MF	(Netherlands)	Youssef El Jebli	9	1	10
2	11	MF	(Brazil)	Guilherme	5	0	5
3	3	DF	(Brazil)	Igor Rossi	4	0	4
3	8	MF	(Brazil)	Luisinho	2	2	4
3	9	FW	(Brazil)	William	3	1	4
6	7	MF	(Curaçao)	Roly Bonevacia	2	1	3
6	12	DF	(Saudi Arabia)	Khalid Al-Ghamdi	3	0	3
6	88	MF	(Trinidad and Tobago)	Khaleem Hyland	3	0	3
9	4	DF	(Brazil)	Raphael Silva	2	0	2
9	17	MF	(Saudi Arabia)	Ahmed Ashraf	2	0	2
9	18	DF	(Saudi Arabia)	Mohammed Qassem	1	1	2
9	77	MF	(Saudi Arabia)	Khalid Kaabi	2	0	2
13	23	DF	(Saudi Arabia)	Awadh Khrees	0	1	1
13	26	GK	(Saudi Arabia)	Mustafa Malayekah	1	0	1
13	80	FW	(Saudi Arabia)	Mohammed Al-Saiari	1	0	1
Own goal					1	0	1
Total					41	7	48

Last Updated: 9 September 2020

=== Clean sheets ===
Rank	No.	Pos	Nat	Name	Pro League	King Cup	Total
1	26	GK	(Saudi Arabia)	Mustafa Malayekah	8	0	8
2	28	GK	(Saudi Arabia)	Ahmed Al-Kassar	0	1	1
Total					8	1	9

Last Updated: 15 August 2020
