= 2019–20 King's Cup (Saudi Arabia) =

2019–20 King Cup
Custodian of the Two Holy Mosques Cup

Tournament details
- Country: Saudi Arabia
- Dates: 3 November 2019 – 28 November 2020
- Teams: 64

Final positions
- Champions: Al-Hilal (9th Title)
- Runners-up: Al-Nassr

Tournament statistics
- Matches played: 63
- Goals scored: 213 (3.38 per match)
- Top goal scorer(s): Carolus Andria (8 goals)

The 2019–20 King Cup, or The Custodian of the Two Holy Mosques Cup, was the 45th edition of the King Cup since its establishment in 1957, and the 2nd under the current format. It commenced on 3 November 2019 and concluded with the final on 28 November 2020. Originally, the final was to have been played by May 2020, but the competition was delayed due to the effects of the COVID-19 pandemic in Saudi Arabia.

Al-Taawoun were the defending champions, but they were eliminated by Abha in the Round of 16.

Al-Hilal won their ninth title after a 2–1 win over Al-Nassr in the final on 28 November 2020. As Al-Hilal had already qualified for the 2021 AFC Champions League, Al-Wehda entered the 2021 AFC Champions League in the qualifying play-offs round.

== Participating teams ==
A total of 64 teams participated in this season. 16 teams from the Pro league, 20 teams from the MS League, 24 teams from the Second Division and 4 teams qualifying from the preliminary stage.

League	Teams
Pro League	Abha; Al-Adalah; Al-Ahli; Al-Ettifaq; Al-Faisaly; Al-Fateh; Al-Fayha; Al-Hazem; Al-Hilal; Al-Ittihad; Al-Nassr; Al-Raed; Al-Shabab; Al-Taawoun ^{TH}; Al-Wehda; Damac
MS League	Al-Ain; Al-Ansar; Al-Batin; Al-Bukayriyah; Al-Jabalain; Al-Jeel; Al-Kawkab; Al-Khaleej; Al-Mujazzal; Al-Nahda; Al-Nojoom; Al-Qadsiah; Al-Shoulla; Al-Tai; Al-Taqadom; Al-Thoqbah; Hetten; Jeddah; Najran; Ohod
Second Division	Afif; Al-Akhdoud; Al-Anwar; Al-Arabi; Al-Dera'a; Al-Diriyah; Al-Entesar; Al-Hejaz; Al-Jandal; Al-Jubail; Al-Kholood; Al-Orobah; Al-Qaisumah; Al-Rawdhah; Al-Riyadh; Al-Sadd; Al-Safa; Al-Sahel; Al-Sharq; Al-Suqoor; Al-Washm; Arar; Hajer; Wej
Third Division	Al-Lewaa; Okaz; Tabarjal; Tuwaiq

== Bracket ==
Round of 64
H	Al-Taawoun	3
A	Al-Lewaa	0
H	Al-Ain	2
A	Al-Sadd	0
A	Abha	2
H	Al-Qaisumah	1
A	Al-Batin	1
H	Al-Arabi	2
H	Al-Ittihad	4
A	Al-Riyadh	0
A	Al-Kawkab	1
H	Al-Safa	3
A	Al-Fateh	4
H	Al-Entesar	0
H	Najran	3
A	Al-Kholood	0
A	Ohod	1
H	Al-Sahel	0
A	Al-Nahda	4
H	Al-Akhdoud (a.e.t.)	5
A	Al-Ettifaq	6
H	Al-Taqadom	0
H	Al-Tai (a.e.t.)	2
A	Al-Washm	1
A	Al-Faisaly	3
H	Wej	0
H	Jeddah	2
A	Hetten	1
H	Al-Hilal	4
A	Arar	1
H	Al-Jabalain	2
A	Al-Thoqbah	0
A	Al-Nassr	5
H	Afif	1
H	Al-Ansar	0
A	Al-Bukayriyah (a.e.t.)	1
A	Damac	1
H	Al-Hejaz	0
H	Al-Jeel (a.e.t.)	2
A	Al-Anwar	1
A	Al-Adalah (a.e.t.)	2
H	Al-Jubail	1
H	Al-Qadsiah	1
A	Al-Rawdhah	2
A	Al-Shabab	6
H	Tabarjal	0
H	Al-Shoulla	1
A	Al-Suqoor	0
A	Al-Wehda	2
H	Al-Sharq	1
A	Al-Khaleej	2
H	Al-Diriyah	0
A	Al-Raed	2
H	Hajer	1
H	Al-Mujazzal	3
A	Tuwaiq	1
A	Al-Fayha	3
H	Okaz	0
H	Al-Hazem	2
A	Al-Dera'a (a.e.t.)	3
H	Al-Ahli	4
A	Al-Jandal	1
H	Al-Nojoom	3
A	Al-Orobah	2

Round of 32
A	Al-Taawoun	2
H	Al-Ain	0
H	Abha	1
A	Al-Arabi	0
A	Al-Ittihad	4
H	Al-Safa	1
A	Al-Fateh	3
H	Najran	1
A	Ohod	2
H	Al-Akhdoud	1
H	Al-Ettifaq	2
A	Al-Tai	1
A	Al-Faisaly	2
H	Jeddah	1
H	Al-Hilal	4
A	Al-Jabalain	2
H	Al-Nassr	3
A	Al-Bukayriyah	1
H	Damac	2
A	Al-Jeel	1
H	Al-Adalah	8
A	Al-Rawdhah	0
A	Al-Shabab	1
H	Al-Shoulla (a.e.t.)	2
H	Al-Wehda	1
A	Al-Khaleej	0
H	Al-Raed (a.e.t.)	3
A	Al-Mujazzal	1
H	Al-Fayha	5
A	Al-Dera'a	0
A	Al-Ahli	3
H	Al-Nojoom	1

Round of 16
A	Al-Taawoun	0
H	Abha	1
H	Al-Ittihad	1
A	Al-Fateh	2
A	Ohod	1
H	Al-Ettifaq	7
H	Al-Faisaly	2 (5)
A	Al-Hilal (pen.)	2 (6)
A	Al-Nassr	4
H	Damac	2
H	Al-Adalah	2
A	Al-Shoulla	0
H	Al-Wehda (pen.)	0 (4)
A	Al-Raed	0 (3)
H	Al-Fayha	0
A	Al-Ahli	1

Quarter-finals
H	Abha (pen.)	1 (5)
A	Al-Fateh	1 (3)
A	Al-Ettifaq	1
H	Al-Hilal (a.e.t.)	2
A	Al-Nassr	1
H	Al-Adalah	0
H	Al-Wehda	1
A	Al-Ahli	2

Semi-finals
A	Abha	0
H	Al-Hilal	2
A	Al-Nassr	2
H	Al-Ahli	1

Final
–	Al-Hilal	2
–	Al-Nassr	1

Note: H: Home team, A: Away team

Source: SAFF

== Round of 64 ==
The draw for the Round of 64 was held on 7 October 2019. The Round of 64 matches were played between 3 and 13 November 2019. All times are local, AST (UTC+3).

3 November 2019 8	Jeddah (2)	2–1	Hetten (2)	Jeddah
15:50	Omar 14', 27'; Al-Qarni (yellow card) 64'	Report	Dhamri 22'; Shoqaiqi (yellow card) 45+1'; Daghriri (yellow card) 48'	Stadium: Prince Mohammed bin Abdullah Al Faisal Stadium; Referee: Mohammed Al-Nuhait

3 November 2019 4	Al-Hilal (1)	4–1	Arar (3)	Riyadh
19:45	Hamani 43' (o.g.); Al-Shalhoub 57'; Carlos Eduardo 81'; Bahebri 90+1'	Report	Al-Khater (yellow card) 48'; F. Al-Enezi 90+3'	Stadium: King Saud University Stadium; Attendance: 7,604; Referee: Shukri Al-Hanfoush

4 November 2019 26	Al-Ansar (2)	0–1 (a.e.t.)	Al-Bukayriyah (2)	Medina
15:50	Sakala (yellow card) 21'; Khamees (yellow card) 50'; Al-Shanqiti (yellow card) 77'	Report	Al-Barakah (yellow card) 25'; Al-Sonaitan (yellow card) 35'; Onobi (yellow card) 61'; Pato 119'	Stadium: Al-Ansar Club Stadium; Referee: Mohammed Al-Daqqash

4 November 2019 2	Okaz (4)	0–3	Al-Fayha (1)	Mecca
18:25		Report	Neto (yellow card) 31'; Arsénio 35', (yellow card) 64'; Al-Sebyani (yellow card) 52'; Al-Selouli 65'; Al-Mutairi 72'	Stadium: King Abdul Aziz Stadium; Referee: Majed Al-Shamrani

4 November 2019 12	Al-Jabalain (2)	2–0	Al-Thoqbah (2)	Ha'il
18:35	Tsiskaridze (yellow card) 13', (goal) 47'; Miranda (yellow card) 17'; Al-Rabee (yellow card) 81'; Al-Telhi 84'	Report	Haqawi (yellow card) 14'; Elhaj (yellow card) 14'; Al-Dossari (yellow card) 48'; Al-Aqeeli (yellow card) 79'	Stadium: Prince Abdul Aziz bin Musa'ed Stadium; Referee: Ahmed Al-Remeikhany

5 November 2019 18	Al-Sharq (3)	1–2	Al-Wehda (1)	Al-Kharj
15:30	Khalil (yellow card) 55'; Boussaid 84'	Report	Anselmo (yellow card) 66'; Goodwin 77'; Niakaté 90+2' (pen.)	Stadium: Al-Shoulla Club Stadium; Referee: Sultan Al-Harbi

5 November 2019 14	Al-Mujazzal (2)	3–1	Tuwaiq (4)	Al Majma'ah
15:35	Al-Zubaidi 10'; Al-Ali 57', 85'	Report	Al-Mutairi 8'; Al-Khaibari (yellow card) 81'	Stadium: Al Majma'ah Sports City; Referee: Mamdouh Asiri

5 November 2019 23	Al-Qaisumah (3)	1–2	Abha (1)	Hafar al-Batin
15:35	Al-Enezi (yellow card) 49'; Bakaki 78'	Report	Al Abbas 9'; Al-Habib (yellow card) 27'; Andriatsima 32'; Al-Nabit (yellow card) 90+2'	Stadium: Al-Batin Club Stadium; Referee: Abdullah Al-Nuhait

5 November 2019 20	Al-Jeel (2)	2–1 (a.e.t.)	Al-Anwar (3)	Al-Hasa
17:35	Al-Dandan 23'; Al-Suwiei (yellow card) 31'; Al-Dossari 96', (yellow card) 114'	Report	Al-Othman 87'; Al-Ghannam (yellow card) 99'	Stadium: Prince Abdullah bin Jalawi Stadium; Referee: Mohammed Mare'e

5 November 2019 1	Al-Qadsiah (2)	1–2	Al-Rawdhah (3)	Khobar
18:00	Al-Shoeil 30'; Al-Ghannam (yellow card) 76'; Al-Amri (yellow card) 90+5'	Report	Al-Hemel 12'; Al-Rabee (yellow card) 82'; Saif Eldeen 84'	Stadium: Al-Qadsiah Club Stadium; Referee: Abdullah Al-Kharboush

5 November 2019 3	Al-Ahli (1)	4–1	Al-Jandal (3)	Jeddah
20:15	Belaïli 45+3'; Al-Khabrani (yellow card) 57'; Al-Moasher 58'; Al-Mogahwi 60'; Lucas Lima 77'	Report	Kassola (yellow card) 7'; Faleh 22'; Nofal (yellow card) 90+1'	Stadium: King Abdullah Sports City; Attendance: 2,462; Referee: Mohammed Al-Hoaish

6 November 2019 11	Al-Safa (3)	3–1	Al-Kawkab (2)	Safwa
15:00	Al Eid 8', 41'; Al-Traidi 15'; Al-Hariri (yellow card) 47'; Hawsawi (yellow card) 75'	Report	Al-Dohaim 10'; Abu Bakr (yellow card) 43'; Al-Rashoud (yellow card) 75'	Stadium: Al-Safa Club Stadium; Referee: Mohammed Al-Amri

6 November 2019 6	Al-Hazem (1)	2–3 (a.e.t.)	Al-Dera'a (3)	Al Bukayriyah
15:30	Tandia 55'; Strandberg 90+3'; Al-Khalaf (yellow card) 120'	Report	Al-Kanani 5'; Al-Harthi 53'; Hawsawi (yellow card) 83'; Bouguerra (yellow card) 97'; Gloulou (yellow card) 100'; Bakheet 104' (o.g.)	Stadium: Al-Bukayriyah Club Stadium; Referee: Khaled Salwi

6 November 2019 22	Al-Entesar (3)	0–4	Al-Fateh (1)	Jeddah
15:50	Mashlwi (yellow card) 28'	Report	Aguirregaray 33', 45+3'; Al-Saeed 60' (pen.); Al-Yousef 62'	Stadium: Al-Ittihad Club Stadium; Referee: Abdullah Zarban

6 November 2019 24	Al-Nojoom (2)	3–2	Al-Orobah (3)	Al-Hasa
17:35	Al-Qunayan (yellow card) 42'; Bo Amer 43', 79'; Al-Khalifah 74'	Report	Afana 8', 90+3'; Al-Daraan (yellow card) 90'	Stadium: Prince Abdullah bin Jalawi Stadium; Referee: Raed Al-Zahrani

7 November 2019 31	Al-Shoulla (2)	1–0	Al-Suqoor (3)	Al-Kharj
15:15	Daouda (yellow card) 55'; Soro 69', (yellow card) 90+4'; Al-Bishi (yellow card) 81'	Report		Stadium: Al-Shoulla Club Stadium; Referee: Hussain Abo Shahin

7 November 2019 10	Al-Taqadom (2)	0–6	Al-Ettifaq (1)	Unaizah
15:25	Al-Hadhriti (yellow card) 80'	Report	Kiss 13', 25'; Haddadi 54'; Al-Kwikbi 59'; Yambéré 75', (yellow card) 87'; Mahnashi (yellow card) 80'; Al-Hazaa 83'	Stadium: Al-Najma Club Stadium; Referee: Majed Al-Shamrani

7 November 2019 32	Al-Tai (2)	2–1 (a.e.t.)	Al-Washm (3)	Ha'il
15:25	Dudu 41'; Hassan (yellow card) 112'; Al-Sohaymi 115'	Report	Sahari 12'; Barnawi (yellow card) 38'; Batiah (yellow card) 120+2'	Stadium: Prince Abdul Aziz bin Musa'ed Stadium; Referee: Abdulsamad Bakri

7 November 2019 7	Al-Hejaz (3)	0–1	Damac (1)	Al Bahah
15:45	Salem (yellow card) 35'; Al-Zahrani (yellow card) 88'	Report	Zezinho 73' (pen.)	Stadium: King Saud Sport City Stadium; Referee: Sami Al-Jires

7 November 2019 25	Najran (2)	3–0	Al-Kholood (3)	Najran
18:10	Coppetti 10'; Vieira 35'; Al-Suhail 90+1'	Report	Zain (yellow card) 48'	Stadium: Najran University Stadium; Referee: Ibrahim Al-Aseel

8 November 2019 16	Al-Diriyah (3)	0–2	Al-Khaleej (2)	Riyadh
15:15	Al-Ameeri (yellow card) 57'; Al-Daheem (yellow card) 79'	Report	Al-Dossari 37' (o.g.); Al-Hamdhi (yellow card) 40'; Al-Najrani (yellow card) 45'; Al-Rashidi (yellow card) 80'; Al-Dhefiri 85'	Stadium: Prince Turki bin Abdulaziz Stadium; Referee: Abdullah Al-Awidan

8 November 2019 28	Al-Ain (2)	2–0	Al-Sadd (3)	Al Bahah
15:45	Al-Heji 45'; Jahaf (yellow card) 55'; Al-Harthi 76'; Lakhal (yellow card) 76'	Report	Al-Saeed (yellow card) 53'; Mansor (yellow card) 76'	Stadium: King Saud Sport City Stadium; Referee: Turki Hashlan

8 November 2019 19	Al-Nahda (2)	4–5 (a.e.t.)	Al-Akhdoud (3)	Dammam
17:35	Al-Enezi 10'; Al-Ghamdi 21', (yellow card) 66'; Al-Jalfan 29'; Al-Robeai 41' (o.g.); Al-Dossari (yellow card) 58'; Al-Shwier (yellow card) 90+1'	Report	El Agamy 11'; Hakami 74'; Al-Harthi (yellow card) 80', (goal) 88'; Al-Robeai 84'; Al-Salem 120'	Stadium: Prince Fahd bin Salman Stadium; Referee: Maitham Al-Daleem

8 November 2019 5	Al-Arabi (3)	2–1	Al-Batin (2)	Unaizah
18:00	Al-Noman 30'; Mubarak 75'	Report	Al-Mozairib 51'; Obaid (yellow card) 55'	Stadium: Al-Najma Club Stadium; Referee: Mishari Howaidi

8 November 2019 13	Al-Ittihad (1)	4–0	Al-Riyadh (3)	Jeddah
20:00	Romarinho 19', 48'; Al-Enezi 65' (o.g.); Vecchio 71'	Report	Al-Dossari (yellow card) 53'	Stadium: King Abdullah Sports City; Attendance: 8,288; Referee: Mohammed Al-Smail

9 November 2019 29	Al-Jubail (3)	1–2 (a.e.t.)	Al-Adalah (1)	Jubail
15:15	Kechrid 8'; Hubail (yellow card) 90+4'	Report	Andria 24', 96'	Stadium: Al-Jubail Club Stadium; Referee: Sultan Okairi

9 November 2019 9	Afif (3)	1–5	Al-Nassr (1)	Al Majma'ah
16:20	Al-Otaibi (yellow card) 6'; Ben Abda 78'	Report	Musa 23', 55'; Khamis 44'; Al Mansor 51'; Giuliano 71' (pen.)	Stadium: Al Majma'ah Sports City; Referee: Turki Al-Khudair

9 November 2019 27	Al-Sahel (3)	0–1	Ohod (2)	Saihat
17:35	Al-Dakhlan (yellow card) 62'	Report	Al-Sohaymi (yellow card) 20'; Al-Harbi 84'	Stadium: Prince Nayef bin Abdulaziz Stadium; Referee: Fureih Al-Jalood

10 November 2019 15	Hajer (3)	0–2	Al-Raed (1)	Al-Hasa
17:35	Al-Shehri (yellow card) 67'; Al-Sandal (yellow card) 80'	Report	Pérez 38'; Djoum (yellow card) 45+1'; Al-Ghamdi 50'; Al-Zain (yellow card) 90'	Stadium: Hajer Club Stadium; Referee: Mohammed Al-Buraidi

10 November 2019 30	Al-Taawoun (1)	3–0	Al-Lewaa (4)	Buraidah
17:55	Al-Daajani 32'; Al-Muwallad 48', 78'	Report		Stadium: Al-Taawoun Club Stadium; Referee: Abdullah Dhafer

11 November 2019 17	Wej (3)	0–3	Al-Faisaly (1)	Mecca
18:20	Traoré (yellow card) 66'; Al-Budair (yellow card) 78'; Hawsawi (yellow card) 80'	Report	Luisinho 13'; El Jebli 53'; Qassem (yellow card) 68'; Khrees 84'	Stadium: King Abdul Aziz Stadium; Referee: Faisal Al-Blwi

13 November 2019 21	Tabarjal (4)	0–6	Al-Shabab (1)	Sakakah
15:30	Ibrahim (yellow card) 77'	Report	Guanca 16', 72'; Sebá 62'; Sharahili 66'; N'Diaye 80'; Al-Sahlawi 85' (pen.)	Stadium: Al-Jouf University Stadium; Referee: Abdullah Al-Nuhait

== Round of 32 ==
The draw for the Round of 32, as well as the draw for the rest of tournament, was held on 26 November 2019. The Round of 32 matches will be played from 3 to 7 December 2019. All times are local, AST (UTC+3).

3 December 2019 37	Al-Akhdoud (3)	1–2	Ohod (2)	Najran
15:25	Takrouni (yellow card) 47'; Al-Salem 52'; Hakami (red card) 73'; Al-Zabadin (yellow card) 90'	Report	Arishi 65', 80'; Ahmed (yellow card) 67'; Saleh (yellow card) 90+2'; Al-Rashidi (yellow card) 90+4'	Stadium: Najran University Stadium; Referee: Mohammed Al-Daqqash

3 December 2019 45	Al-Wehda (1)	1–0	Al-Khaleej (2)	Mecca
18:15	Botía (yellow card) 12'; Niakaté 61', (yellow card) 87'	Report	Al-Najrani (yellow card) 25'; Al-Dhefiri (yellow card) 90+2'	Stadium: King Abdul Aziz Stadium; Referee: Mohammed Al-Nuhait

4 December 2019 36	Najran (2)	1–3	Al-Fateh (1)	Najran
15:25	Al-Shanqeeti 27'; Al-Dossari (yellow card) 66'; Al-Johani (yellow card) 90+3'	Report	Al Hassan (yellow card) 4' te Vrede 10'; Koval (yellow card) 21'; Al-Zaqaan 31', (yellow card) 90+6'; Al-Saeed 54'; Saâdane (yellow card) 66'	Stadium: Najran University Stadium; Referee: Mamdouh Al Shahdan

4 December 2019 44	Al-Shoulla (2)	2–1 (a.e.t.)	Al-Shabab (1)	Al-Kharj
17:45	Sami (yellow card) 67'; Seraj (yellow card) 81'; Rawaf 83'; Al-Mutairi (yellow card) 90'; Haqawi (yellow card) 106'; Daouda 120+2'	Report	Sebá (yellow card) 22'; Salem 43'; Ilyas (yellow card) 78'	Stadium: Al-Shoulla Club Stadium; Referee: Sultan Al-Harbi

4 December 2019 39	Jeddah (2)	1–2	Al-Faisaly (1)	Jeddah
18:20	Sory (yellow card) 60'; Al-Muwallad (yellow card) 70', (goal) 90+1'; Al-Safri (yellow card) 80'	Report	Al-Ghamdi (yellow card) 2'; Luisinho 44'; William 52'	Stadium: King Abdullah Sports City Reserve Stadium; Referee: Ahmed Al-Remeikhany

5 December 2019 43	Al-Adalah (1)	8–0	Al-Rawdhah (3)	Al-Hasa
14:55	Andria 2', 32', 34', 45', 60'; Al-Qasimi 47' (o.g.); Al-Nadhri 52'; Al-Eisa 77'	Report	Al-Nufaili (yellow card) 18'	Stadium: Prince Abdullah bin Jalawi Stadium; Attendance: 3,343; Referee: Khaled Salwi

5 December 2019 47	Al-Fayha (1)	5–0	Al-Dera'a (3)	Al Majma'ah
15:10	Ba Masoud 8'; Fernández 18', 79'; Owusu 55'; Al-Qurashi 65' (o.g.); Assis (yellow card) 90'	Report		Stadium: Al Majma'ah Sports City; Referee: Abdullah Al-Awidan

5 December 2019 42	Damac (1)	2–1	Al-Jeel (2)	Abha
15:20	Al-Najei 35'; Zezinho 40'	Report	Al-Dossari 86'	Stadium: Prince Sultan bin Abdul Aziz Stadium; Referee: Mohammed Al-Buraidi

6 December 2019 46	Al-Raed (1)	3–1 (a.e.t.)	Al-Mujazzal (2)	Buraidah
15:15	Al-Ghamdi 91', 98'; Al-Rehaili (yellow card) 107'; Daoudi 111' (pen.)	Report	Al-Obaid (yellow card) 21'; Cléber (yellow card) 81'; Christovão 119'	Stadium: King Abdullah Sport City Stadium; Referee: Raed Al-Zahrani

6 December 2019 33	Al-Ain (2)	0–2	Al-Taawoun (1)	Al Bahah
15:35	Ouattara (yellow card) 85'	Report	Héldon 21'; Petrolina 60'	Stadium: King Saud Sport City Stadium; Referee: Khaled Al-Teris

6 December 2019 48	Al-Nojoom (2)	1–3	Al-Ahli (1)	Al-Hasa
17:25	Al-Soraihi (yellow card) 49'; Al-Ammari 83' (pen.)	Report	Belaïli 3', 60'; Sarić (yellow card) 40'; Ghareeb 85'	Stadium: Prince Abdullah bin Jalawi Stadium; Referee: Abdullah Dhafer

6 December 2019 38	Al-Ettifaq (1)	2–1	Al-Tai (2)	Dammam
17:25	Al-Selouli 80'; Al-Hazaa 86'; Mahnashi (yellow card) 90+4'	Report	Al-Aqel (yellow card) 36'; Silva 60'	Stadium: Prince Mohamed bin Fahd Stadium; Referee: Khaled Al-Senani

6 December 2019 41	Al-Nassr (1)	4–1	Al-Bukayriyah (2)	Riyadh
19:45	Al Mansor (yellow card) 15'; Hamdallah 31'; Petros 48'; Giuliano 50'; Amrabat 63'	Report	Ben Salah (yellow card) 66'; Al-Ghamdi 87'	Stadium: Prince Faisal bin Fahd Stadium; Referee: Shukri Al-Hanfoush

7 December 2019 34	Abha (1)	1–0	Al-Arabi (3)	Abha
15:30	Andriatsima 79'	Report		Stadium: Prince Sultan bin Abdul Aziz Stadium; Referee: Khaled Salwi

7 December 2019 35	Al-Safa (3)	1–4	Al-Ittihad (1)	Dammam
17:25	Al Farid 20'; Al-Ahsaei (yellow card) 50'	Report	Prijović 32', (yellow card) 90+1' da Costa 63'; Romarinho 69', 80'	Stadium: Prince Mohamed bin Fahd Stadium; Referee: Abdullah Al-Nuhait

7 December 2019 40	Al-Hilal (1)	4–2	Al-Jabalain (2)	Riyadh
17:45	Al-Shalhoub 25'; Kharbin 55'; Carrillo 86'; Eduardo 90'	Report	Carlão 28'; Zidan (yellow card) 79'; El Okbi 82'	Stadium: Prince Faisal bin Fahd Stadium; Referee: Mohammed Al-Hoaish

== Round of 16 ==
The dates for the Round of 16 fixtures were announced on 8 December 2019. Two matches were played on 23 and 24 December 2019, due to Al-Nassr and Al-Taawoun's participation in the 2019 Saudi Super Cup. The rest of the matches were played from 1 to 4 January 2020. All times are local, AST (UTC+3).

23 December 2019 49	Abha (1)	1–0	Al-Taawoun (1)	Abha
15:40	Al-Najei 41', (yellow card) 41'; Al-Nabit (yellow card) 83'	Report	Amissi (yellow card) 90+4'	Stadium: Prince Sultan bin Abdul Aziz Stadium; Referee: Artur Soares Dias (Portugal)

24 December 2019 53	Damac (1)	2–4	Al-Nassr (1)	Abha
15:40	Abo Shararah 38', 44'; Zezinho (yellow card) 54'; Abousaban (yellow card) 65'; Al-Najei (red card) 66'	Report	Hamdallah 45+5' (pen.), 83' (pen.), 84'; Al-Shehri 76'	Stadium: Prince Sultan bin Abdul Aziz Stadium; Referee: Bakary Gassama (Gambia)

1 January 2020 50	Al-Ittihad (1)	1–2	Al-Fateh (1)	Mecca
18:30	El Ahmadi 13'; Abdulwahed (yellow card) 48'; Al-Daheem (yellow card) 63'	Report	te Vrede 15'; Al-Shamrani 89' (o.g.)	Stadium: King Abdul Aziz Stadium; Referee: Ovidiu Hațegan (Romania)

2 January 2020 56	Al-Fayha (1)	0–1	Al-Ahli (1)	Al Majma'ah
18:00		Report	Al Somah 82'	Stadium: Al Majma'ah Sports City; Referee: Bas Nijhuis (Netherlands)

2 January 2020 55	Al-Wehda (1)	0–0 (a.e.t.) (4–3 p)	Al-Raed (1)	Mecca
19:50	Al-Qarni (yellow card) 17'; Al-Rio (yellow card) 71'; Al-Qahtani (yellow card) 87'; Niakaté (yellow card) 90+2'; Botía (yellow card) 114'; Renato (yellow card) 117'	Report	Al-Ghamdi (yellow card) 41'; Daoudi (yellow card) 92'; Doukha (yellow card) 120'	Stadium: King Abdul Aziz Stadium; Referee: Igor Pajac (Croatia)
	Penalties
	Goodwin (penalty missed); Niakaté (penalty scored); Al-Saiari (penalty scored); Al-Qahtani (penalty scored); Anselmo (penalty missed); Al-Shamlan (penalty scored)		(penalty scored) Fouzair; (penalty scored) Palomeque; (penalty missed) Al-Sahli; (penalty scored) Daoudi; (penalty missed) Al-Sharimi; (penalty missed) Pérez

3 January 2020 51	Al-Ettifaq (1)	7–1	Ohod (2)	Dammam
17:40	Kiss 10' (pen.), (yellow card) 22'; Sliti 34', 76'; Al-Kwikbi (yellow card) 67', (goal) 70', 79'; Al-Hazaa 69'; Al-Robeai 88'	Report	Al-Qarni (yellow card) 8'; Al-Motawaa (yellow card) 37'; Al-Enezi 83'	Stadium: Prince Mohamed bin Fahd Stadium; Referee: Tamás Bognár (Hungary)

3 January 2020 52	Al-Faisaly (1)	2–2 (5–6 p)	Al-Hilal (1)	Al Majma'ah
19:50	Bonevacia 29' (pen.); Qassem 73'; Hyland (yellow card) 89'; Rossi (yellow card) 90'; Malayekah (yellow card) 90+5'; Al-Dawsari (yellow card) 101'	Report	Al-Breik 19'; Jahfali (yellow card) 41'; Al-Shehri 63'; Kanno (yellow card) 70'; Gomis (yellow card) 114'	Stadium: Al Majma'ah Sports City; Referee: Ivan Bebek (Croatia)
	Penalties
	Hyland (penalty scored); Silva (penalty scored); William (penalty scored); Al-Dawsari (penalty scored); Rossi (penalty scored); Qassem (penalty missed)		(penalty scored) Carrillo; (penalty scored) Al-Breik; (penalty scored) Al-Dawsari; (penalty scored) Gomis; (penalty scored) Al-Mayouf; (penalty scored) Al-Abed

4 January 2020 54	Al-Adalah (1)	2–0	Al-Shoulla (2)	Al-Hasa
15:05	Cissé (yellow card) 13'; Mandaw 15'; Andria 29', (yellow card) 29'; Al-Sultan (yellow card) 38'; Al-Hajoj (yellow card) 64'; Al Gubaie (yellow card) 70'	Report	Al-Bishi (yellow card) 9'; Daouda (yellow card) 56'; Tamihi (yellow card) 60'; Gharsellaoui (yellow card) 90+4'	Stadium: Prince Abdullah bin Jalawi Stadium; Referee: Viktor Kassai (Hungary)

== Quarter-finals ==
The dates for the Quarter-finals fixtures were announced on 6 January 2020. The matches were played from 16 to 18 January 2020. All times are local, AST (UTC+3).

16 January 2020 58	Al-Hilal (1)	2–1 (a.e.t.)	Al-Ettifaq (1)	Riyadh
18:05	Al-Shehri 4', 96'; Bahebri (yellow card) 55'; Giovinco (yellow card) 78'	Report	Al-Hazaa (yellow card) 45+2'; Mahnashi (yellow card) 64'; Al-Robeai (red card) 72'; Al-Amri (yellow card) 81'; Kiss 85' (pen.); Al-Kwikbi (yellow card) 115'	Stadium: King Saud University Stadium; Attendance: 18,731; Referee: Bobby Madden (Scotland)

17 January 2020 59	Al-Adalah (1)	0–1	Al-Nassr (1)	Al-Hasa
17:55	Al-Sultan (yellow card) 21'; Andria (yellow card) 74'	Report	Giuliano (yellow card) 26'; Hamdallah 51'; Al-Dossari (yellow card) 68'	Stadium: Prince Abdullah bin Jalawi Stadium; Attendance: 9,669; Referee: Aleksei Kulbakov (Belarus)

18 January 2020 57	Abha (1)	1–1 (a.e.t.) (5–3 p)	Al-Fateh (1)	Abha
15:55	Barnawi (yellow card) 21'; Bguir 28' (pen.); Fallatah (yellow card) 90+2'	Report	Al-Saeed (yellow card) 25'; Saâdane 50'	Stadium: Prince Sultan bin Abdul Aziz Stadium; Referee: Andris Treimanis (Latvia)
	Penalties
	Andriatsima (penalty scored); Al-Najar (penalty scored); Aouadhi (penalty scored); Bguir (penalty scored); Qaisi (penalty scored)		(penalty scored) Saâdane; (penalty scored) Janota; (penalty missed) Al-Nakhli; (penalty scored) Boushal

18 January 2020 60	Al-Wehda (1)	1–2	Al-Ahli (1)	Mecca
18:40	Al-Zori 8'; Bakshween (yellow card) 23'; Chaves (yellow card) 29'; Goodwin (yellow card) 38'; Al-Qarni (yellow card) 41'; Al-Saiari (yellow card) 59'; Al-Nemer (yellow card) 90+3'	Report	Al Somah 26' (pen.), (yellow card) 54'; Al-Mowalad (yellow card) 27'; Marin 68'; Souza (yellow card) 73'	Stadium: King Abdul Aziz Stadium; Referee: Ivan Bebek (Croatia)

== Semi-finals ==
The dates for the Semi-finals fixtures were announced on 21 January 2020. The matches were scheduled to be played on 15 March 2020. On 14 March 2020, the Saudi Ministry of Sports announced that the semi-finals would be postponed due to the COVID-19 pandemic. The fixtures were revised to the 27 October 2020 following the end of the suspension. All ties were played behind closed doors. All times are local, AST (UTC+3).

27 October 2020 61	Al-Hilal (1)	2–0	Abha (1)	Riyadh
17:55	Al-Dawsari 28', (yellow card) 66'; Cuéllar (yellow card) 38'; Giovinco 45+1'	Report		Stadium: Prince Faisal bin Fahd Stadium; Attendance: 0 Referee: Eber Aquino (Paraguay)

27 October 2020 62	Al-Ahli (1)	1–2	Al-Nassr (1)	Jeddah
20:30	Al Somah 19'; Fejsa (yellow card) 33'; Fettouhi (yellow card) 41'; Hassoun (yellow card) 46'; Al-Moasher (yellow card) 60'; Hawsawi (yellow card) 82'	Report	Martínez (yellow card) 42', (goal) 85'; Petros 45+3'; Al-Khalaf (yellow card) 80'	Stadium: King Abdullah Sports City; Attendance: 0 Referee: Andrés Rojas (Colombia)

== Final ==
The final was played on 28 November 2020 at the King Fahd International Stadium in Riyadh. All times are local, AST (UTC+3).

28 November 2020
19:45

Al-Hilal	2–1	Al-Nassr
Jang Hyun-soo 10'; Cuéllar (yellow card) 33'; Gomis 42' (pen.); Al-Wotayan (yellow card) 90+5'	Report	Al-Sulayhem (yellow card) 54'; Yahya 71', (yellow card) 83'

King Fahd International Stadium, Riyadh
Attendance: 0
Referee: Szymon Marciniak (Poland)

== Top goalscorers ==
As of 28 November 2020

Rank	Player	Club	Goals
1	(Madagascar) Carolus Andria	Al-Adalah	8
2	(Morocco) Abderrazak Hamdallah	Al-Nassr	5
3	(Brazil) Romarinho	Al-Ittihad	4
3	(Slovakia) Filip Kiss	Al-Ettifaq	4
5	(Saudi Arabia) Raed Al-Ghamdi	Al-Raed/Al-Nassr	3
5	(Algeria) Youcef Belaïli	Al-Ahli	3
5	(Saudi Arabia) Hazaa Al-Hazaa	Al-Ettifaq	3
5	(Saudi Arabia) Mohammed Al-Kwikbi	Al-Ettifaq	3
5	(Saudi Arabia) Saleh Al-Shehri	Al-Hilal	3
5	(Syria) Omar Al Somah	Al-Ahli	3

Note: Players and teams marked in bold are still active in the competition.
