= 2018–19 Al-Faisaly FC season =

Al-Faisaly
2018–19 season
- President: Fahd Al-Medlej
- Manager: Mircea Rednic (until 8 October); Péricles Chamusca (from 14 October)
- Stadium: King Salman Sport City Stadium
- SPL: 6th
- King Cup: Round of 16 (knocked out by Al-Hilal)
- Top goalscorer: League: Rogerinho (8 goals); All: Rogerinho (10 goals)
- Highest home attendance: 3,498 vs Al-Hilal (24 November 2018)
- Lowest home attendance: 503 vs Al-Ahli (11 May 2019)
- Average home league attendance: 1,171
| Home colours | Away colours | Third colours |
- All statistics correct as of 16 May 2019.

The 2018–19 season was Al-Faisaly's 9th consecutive season in Pro League, the top flight of Saudi Arabian football, and their 65th year in existence. Along with the Pro League, the club competed in the King Cup.

The season covers the period from 1 July 2018 to 30 June 2019.

== Players ==
=== Squad information ===
As of 15 January 2019

Note: Flags indicate national team as defined under FIFA eligibility rules; some limited exceptions apply. Players may hold more than one non-FIFA nationality.

| No. | Pos. | Nation | Player |
|---|---|---|---|
| 2 | DF | KSA | Yazeed Al-Bakr |
| 3 | DF | BRA | Igor Rossi |
| 4 | MF | KUW | Fahad Al Ansari (on loan from Al Qadsia) |
| 5 | DF | KSA | Hussein Hawsawi |
| 6 | MF | KSA | Omar Abdulaziz (captain) |
| 7 | DF | KSA | Wesam Al-Sowayed |
| 8 | MF | BRA | Luisinho |
| 9 | FW | BRA | Rogerinho |
| 10 | MF | KSA | Hussain Al-Qahtani |
| 11 | MF | KSA | Abdulaziz Al-Bishi |
| 12 | DF | KSA | Abdulaziz Al-Enazi |
| 14 | MF | KSA | Bader Bashir |
| 18 | FW | COL | Diego Calderón |

| No. | Pos. | Nation | Player |
|---|---|---|---|
| 20 | MF | KSA | Mohammed Al-Thani |
| 21 | DF | KSA | Ageel Balghaith |
| 22 | FW | BRA | Denílson |
| 23 | MF | KSA | Mohammed Abousaban |
| 24 | MF | KSA | Omar Al-Sohaymi |
| 26 | GK | KSA | Mustafa Malayekah |
| 27 | DF | KSA | Hamdan Al-Shamrani |
| 28 | GK | KSA | Ahmed Al-Kassar |
| 31 | GK | KSA | Khalid Sharahili |
| 33 | DF | KSA | Awadh Khrees |
| 47 | MF | KSA | Sultan Mendash |
| 66 | DF | CRO | Ante Puljić |
| 88 | MF | TRI | Khaleem Hyland |

== Transfers ==
=== In ===
| Date | Pos. | Name | Previous club | Fee | Source |
|---|---|---|---|---|---|
| 26 May 2018 | FW | (Colombia) Diego Calderón | (Egypt) Ismaily | €1,280,000 | |
| 29 May 2018 | GK | (Saudi Arabia) Ahmed Al-Kassar | (Saudi Arabia) Al-Ettifaq | Free | |
| 9 June 2018 | MF | (Saudi Arabia) Abdulaziz Al-Bishi | (Saudi Arabia) Al-Shabab | Free | |
| 11 July 2018 | DF | (Saudi Arabia) Hamdan Al-Shamrani | (Saudi Arabia) Al-Ahli | Free | |
| 3 August 2018 | DF | (Saudi Arabia) Ageel Balghaith | (Saudi Arabia) Al-Ahli | Free | |
| 9 August 2018 | DF | (Saudi Arabia) Awadh Khrees | (Saudi Arabia) Al-Ittihad | Free | |
| 13 August 2018 | DF | (Croatia) Ante Puljić | (Russia) Tom Tomsk | Free | |
| 23 August 2018 | FW | (Nigeria) Joseph Akpala | (Belgium) Oostende | Free | |
| 19 January 2019 | GK | (Saudi Arabia) Raghid Al-Najjar | (Saudi Arabia) Al-Shabab | Free | |
| 30 January 2019 | MF | (Saudi Arabia) Abdullah Al-Qahtani | (Saudi Arabia) Abha | Undisclosed | |
| 4 February 2019 | MF | (Yemen) Ahmed Ba Saeed | (Saudi Arabia) Al-Ahli | Free | |
| 3 March 2019 | MF | (Saudi Arabia) Riyadh Sharahili | (Saudi Arabia) Al-Tai | Free | |

=== Loans in ===
| Date | Pos. | Name | Parent club | End date | Source |
|---|---|---|---|---|---|
| 23 August 2018 | MF | (Kuwait) Fahad Al Ansari | (Kuwait) Al Qadsia | End of season | |
| 3 January 2019 | FW | (Brazil) Denílson | (Brazil) Atlético Mineiro | 30 June 2020 | |

=== Out ===
| Date | Pos. | Name | New club | Fee | Source |
|---|---|---|---|---|---|
| 12 March 2018 | DF | (Saudi Arabia) Hamad Al Mansor | (Saudi Arabia) Al-Nassr | Undisclosed | |
| 12 March 2018 | DF | (Saudi Arabia) Sultan Al-Ghanam | (Saudi Arabia) Al-Nassr | Undisclosed | |
| 30 May 2018 | DF | (Saudi Arabia) Mohamed Eid | Unattached | Released | |
| 30 May 2018 | DF | (Brazil) Evson Patrício | Unattached | Released | |
| 21 June 2018 | MF | (Saudi Arabia) Mansor Hamzi | (Saudi Arabia) Al-Fateh | Free | |
| 22 June 2018 | MF | (Saudi Arabia) Abdullah Awaji | (Saudi Arabia) Al-Mujazzal | Free | |
| 23 July 2018 | DF | (Saudi Arabia) Ahmed Al-Najei | (Saudi Arabia) Abha | Free | |
| 24 July 2018 | GK | (Saudi Arabia) Hatem Al-Johani | (Saudi Arabia) Najran | Free | |
| 24 July 2018 | MF | (Nigeria) Moussa Eisa | (Saudi Arabia) Najran | Free | |
| 29 July 2018 | DF | (Saudi Arabia) Fahad Al-Munaif | (Saudi Arabia) Al-Qaisumah | Free | |
| 13 August 2018 | FW | (Brazil) Zé Eduardo | (Brazil) Oeste | Free | |
| 23 August 2018 | DF | (Saudi Arabia) Sultan Al-Deayea | (Saudi Arabia) Al-Fateh | Free | |
| 29 August 2018 | GK | (Saudi Arabia) Ibrahim Zaid | (Saudi Arabia) Al-Washm | Free | |
| 4 September 2018 | FW | (Saudi Arabia) Mohammed Assiri | (Saudi Arabia) Arar | Free | |
| 19 December 2018 | MF | (Saudi Arabia) Fahad Hamad | (Saudi Arabia) Ohod | Free | |
| 13 January 2019 | DF | (Saudi Arabia) Jamaan Al-Dossari | (Saudi Arabia) Al-Fateh | Free | |
| 24 January 2019 | MF | (Saudi Arabia) Abdulaziz Al-Bishi | (Saudi Arabia) Al-Ittihad | €3,000,000 | |
| 11 February 2019 | FW | (Nigeria) Joseph Akpala | | Released | |
| 17 February 2019 | GK | (Saudi Arabia) Khalid Sharahili | (Saudi Arabia) Ohod | Free | |

=== Loans out ===
| Date | Pos. | Name | Subsequent club | End date | Source |
|---|---|---|---|---|---|
| 7 January 2019 | FW | (Saudi Arabia) Mohammed Majrashi | (Saudi Arabia) Ohod | End of season | |
| 8 January 2019 | FW | (Saudi Arabia) Ramzi Solan | (Saudi Arabia) Al-Batin | End of season | |

== Pre-season friendlies ==
| 27 July 2018 Friendly | Al-Faisaly (Saudi Arabia) | 2–3 | (Romania) Daco-Getica București | Bucharest, Romania |
| 17:25 CEST | Calderón 51'; Al-Bishi 63' | Report | 8'; 38'; 73' | Stadium: Premium Wellness Institute |

| 31 July 2018 Friendly | Al-Faisaly (Saudi Arabia) | 2–3 | (Romania) Voluntari | Bucharest, Romania |
| 17:30 CEST | Abousaban 45+1'; Mendash 59' | Report | Achim 6' (pen.); Deac 40'; Malfleury 44' | Stadium: Premium Wellness Institute |

| 3 August 2018 Friendly | Al-Faisaly (Saudi Arabia) | 1–0 | (Romania) Astra Giurgiu | Bucharest, Romania |
| 17:30 CEST | Al-Bishi 61' | Report | | Stadium: Premium Wellness Institute |

| 7 August 2018 Friendly | Al-Faisaly (Saudi Arabia) | 4–0 | (Romania) Rapid București | Bucharest, Romania |
| 18:00 CEST | Calderón 18'; Al-Bishi 26', 41'; Rogerinho 33' | Report | | Stadium: Premium Wellness Institute |

== Competitions ==
=== Overall ===
| Competition | Started round | Current position / round | Final position / round | First match | Last match |
|---|---|---|---|---|---|
| Saudi Pro League | — | — | 6th | 31 August 2018 | 16 May 2019 |
| King Cup | Round of 64 | — | Round of 16 | 2 January 2019 | 21 January 2019 |

Last Updated: 16 May 2019

=== Pro League ===
==== League table ====
| Pos | Team | Pld | W | D | L | GF | GA | GD | Pts | Qualification or relegation |
|---|---|---|---|---|---|---|---|---|---|---|
| 4 | Al-Ahli | 30 | 17 | 4 | 9 | 68 | 41 | +27 | 55 | Qualification for AFC Champions League play-off round |
| 5 | Al-Shabab | 30 | 15 | 9 | 6 | 39 | 25 | +14 | 54 | Qualification for Arab Club Champions Cup |
| 6 | Al-Faisaly | 30 | 12 | 7 | 11 | 51 | 47 | +4 | 43 | |
| 7 | Al-Wehda | 30 | 12 | 6 | 12 | 41 | 41 | 0 | 42 | |
| 8 | Al-Raed | 30 | 10 | 8 | 12 | 38 | 48 | −10 | 38 | |

Source: spl.com
Rules for classification: 1) Points; 2) Head-to-head points; 3) Head-to-head goal difference; 4) Total goal difference; 5) Total goals scored; 6) Play-off (only for deciding champion, relegation and AFC competitions participation).

==== Results summary ====
| Overall | | | | | | | | Home | | | | | | Away | | | | | |
| Pld | W | D | L | GF | GA | GD | Pts | W | D | L | GF | GA | GD | W | D | L | GF | GA | GD |
|---|---|---|---|---|---|---|---|---|---|---|---|---|---|---|---|---|---|---|---|
| 30 | 12 | 7 | 11 | 51 | 47 | +4 | 43 | 7 | 5 | 3 | 28 | 19 | +9 | 5 | 2 | 8 | 23 | 28 | −5 |

Last updated: 16 May 2019.
Source: Competitive matches

==== Results by round ====
| Round | 1 | 2 | 3 | 4 | 5 | 6 | 7 | 8 | 9 | 10 | 11 | 12 | 13 | 14 | 15 | 16 | 17 | 18 | 19 | 20 | 21 | 22 | 23 | 24 | 25 | 26 | 27 | 28 | 29 | 30 |
|---|---|---|---|---|---|---|---|---|---|---|---|---|---|---|---|---|---|---|---|---|---|---|---|---|---|---|---|---|---|---|
| Ground | H | A | H | A | A | H | H | H | H | H | A | A | A | H | H | H | A | H | A | A | A | A | A | H | H | H | A | A | H | A |
| Result | D | L | W | L | L | L | W | W | D | D | D | W | D | W | W | D | L | L | L | W | W | L | L | W | W | D | W | W | L | L |
| Position | 4 | 12 | 8 | 9 | 11 | 12 | 10 | 8 | 8 | 9 | 8 | 8 | 9 | 7 | 7 | 7 | 8 | 8 | 9 | 8 | 8 | 8 | 8 | 7 | 6 | 7 | 6 | 6 | 6 | 6 |

Updated to match(es) played on 20 April 2019. Source: Competitive matches
A = Away; H = Home; W = Win; D = Draw; L = Loss

==== Matches ====
All times are local, AST (UTC+3).

Win Draw Loss Postponed

| 31 August 2018 1 | Al-Faisaly | 2–2 | Al-Batin | Al Majma'ah |
| 19:00 | Rogerinho 29'; Majrashi 41'; Hyland (yellow card) 85' | Report | Bouhaddouz 56'; Arango (yellow card) 77', (goal) 90+5'; Crysan (yellow card) 90'; Nasser (yellow card) 90+2' | Stadium: King Salman Sport City Stadium; Attendance: 2,754; Referee: Milorad Mažić (Serbia) |

| 14 September 2018 2 | Al-Nassr | 2–1 | Al-Faisaly | Riyadh |
| 18:40 | Al-Shehri 19'; Giuliano 63'; Al Mansor (yellow card) 69'; Al-Ghanam (yellow card) 73' | Report | Abousaban (yellow card) 23'; Calderón 27'; Igor Rossi (yellow card) 78' (yellow-red card) 90+9'; Hyland (yellow card) 90+4' | Stadium: Prince Faisal bin Fahd Stadium; Attendance: 12,634; Referee: Viktor Kassai (Hungary) |

| 21 September 2018 3 | Al-Faisaly | 2–0 | Ohod | Al Majma'ah |
| 18:35 | Calderón (yellow card) 45', (goal) 57'; Hawsawi (yellow card) 60'; Al-Bishi (yellow card) 61', (goal) 90+2'; Balghaith (yellow card) 79'; Majrashi (yellow card) 83'; Rogerinho (yellow card) 87' | Report | Teikeu (yellow card) 26'; Šipović (yellow card) 84' | Stadium: King Salman Sport City Stadium; Attendance: 815; Referee: Kevin Blom (Netherlands) |

| 27 September 2018 4 | Al-Hazem | 2–1 | Al-Faisaly | Buraidah |
| 18:35 | Rossi 53' (o.g.); Pajoy (yellow card) 72'; Alemão 90+4' (pen.) | Report | Rogerinho 6'; Calderón (yellow card) 13' | Stadium: King Abdullah Sport City Stadium; Attendance: 1,100; Referee: Damir Skomina (Slovenia) |

| 5 October 2018 5 | Al-Ahli | 2–0 | Al-Faisaly | Jeddah |
| 18:50 | Al Somah 10'; Al-Mowalad (yellow card) 33'; Jurado 45+2' | Report | Majrashi (yellow card) 62'; Balghaith (red card) 64' | Stadium: King Abdullah Sports City; Attendance: 17,466; Referee: Pol van Boekel (Netherlands) |

| 19 October 2018 6 | Al-Faisaly | 1–4 | Al-Taawoun | Al Majma'ah |
| 18:10 | Rogerinho 19' | Report | Héldon 15', 57'; Tawamba 21'; Cássio (yellow card) 52'; Sufyani 69' | Stadium: King Salman Sport City Stadium; Attendance: 1,132; Referee: Simon Lee Evans (Wales) |

| 24 October 2018 7 | Al-Faisaly | 2–0 | Al-Raed | Al Majma'ah |
| 18:05 | Akpala 41', 73'; Al-Shamrani (yellow card) 90+3' | Report | | Stadium: King Salman Sport City Stadium; Attendance: 1,003; Referee: Szymon Marciniak (Poland) |

| 1 November 2018 8 | Al-Faisaly | 5–1 | Al-Ettifaq | Al Majma'ah |
| 18:00 | Calderón 18'; Rogerinho 60', 90+2'; Puljić 75'; Al-Shamrani 79'; Luisinho (yellow card) 90' | Report | Al-Robeai (yellow card) 59'; Alemán 81'; Al-Kwikbi (yellow card) 90' | Stadium: King Salman Sport City Stadium; Attendance: 782; Referee: Svein Oddvar Moen (Norway) |

| 8 November 2018 9 | Al-Faisaly | 0–0 | Al-Shabab | Al Majma'ah |
| 17:50 | | Report | Al-Qumaizi (yellow card) 90+1' | Stadium: King Salman Sport City Stadium; Attendance: 802; Referee: Milorad Mažić (Serbia) |

| 24 November 2018 10 | Al-Faisaly | 1–1 | Al-Hilal | Al Majma'ah |
| 17:50 | Al-Bakr (yellow card) 31'; Puljić (yellow card) 78'; Al-Qahtani 90' | Report | Al Bulaihi (yellow card) 22'; Al-Faraj 80' (pen.); Al-Breik (yellow card) 89' | Stadium: King Salman Sport City Stadium; Attendance: 3,498; Referee: Viktor Kassai (Hungary) |

| 30 November 2018 11 | Al-Qadsiah | 1–1 | Al-Faisaly | Khobar |
| 17:25 | Al-Zain (yellow card) 25'; Williams (yellow card) 34'; Élton 46'; Barnawi (yellow card) 60'; Camara (yellow card) 77'; Bismark (yellow card) 90+4' | Report | Balghaith (yellow card) 8'; Luisinho 61' (pen.); Akpala (yellow card) 90+6' | Stadium: Prince Saud bin Jalawi Stadium; Attendance: 1,178; Referee: Anastasios Sidiropoulos (Greece) |

| 6 December 2018 12 | Al-Ittihad | 1–2 | Al-Faisaly | Jeddah |
| 19:40 | El Ahmadi (yellow card) 47'; Muath (yellow card) 63'; Al-Daheem (yellow card) 90+1'; Al-Muwallad 90+5' | Report | Calderón 11', (yellow card) 88'; Rossi (yellow card) 29', (goal) 54'; Al-Shamrani (yellow card) 89'; Al-Qahtani (yellow card) 90+2' | Stadium: King Abdullah Sports City; Attendance: 23,379; Referee: Ovidiu Hațegan (Romania) |

| 13 December 2018 13 | Al-Fateh | 1–1 | Al-Faisaly | Al-Hasa |
| 17:30 | Oueslati 40' (pen.); Toko (yellow card) 85' | Report | Igor Rossi 61'; Balghaith (yellow card) 81'; Al-Bakr (yellow card) 90+3' | Stadium: Prince Abdullah bin Jalawi Stadium; Attendance: 2,902; Referee: Szymon Marciniak (Poland) |

| 20 December 2018 14 | Al-Faisaly | 3–0 | Al-Wehda | Al Majma'ah |
| 17:50 | Luisinho 1', (yellow card) 71'; Igor Rossi 17'; Al-Bishi 47'; Malayekah (yellow card) 68'; Al-Shamrani (yellow card) 90+3' | Report | Renato Chaves (yellow card) 82'; Fernandão (yellow card) 90+6' | Stadium: King Salman Sport City Stadium; Attendance: 720; Referee: Pavel Královec (Czech Republic) |

| 27 December 2018 15 | Al-Faisaly | 1–0 | Al-Fayha | Al Majma'ah |
| 17:55 | Luisinho (yellow card) 16'; Calderón 90+1', (yellow card) 90+2' | Report | Al-Owdah (yellow card) 13'; Gegé (yellow card) 45+1'; Asprilla (yellow card) 87' | Stadium: King Salman Sport City Stadium; Attendance: 2,417; Referee: Milorad Mažić (Serbia) |

| 10 January 2019 16 | Al-Faisaly | 2–2 | Al-Nassr | Al Majma'ah |
| 18:05 | Al Ansari 56'; Hyland (yellow card) 68'; Rogerinho 90+8' | Report | Amrabat 2'; Uvini (yellow card) 54'; Petros (yellow card) 70'; Al-Jebreen (yellow card) 73'; Al Mansor 85'; Khamis (yellow card) 88' | Stadium: King Salman Sport City Stadium; Attendance: 2,048; Referee: Szymon Marciniak (Poland) |

| 28 January 2019 17 | Al-Batin | 2–0 | Al-Faisaly | Hafar al-Batin |
| 15:30 | Crysan (yellow card) 75', (goal) 90+1' (pen.); Waqes (yellow card) 78'; Al-Ghamdi 85' | Report | Abousaban (yellow card) 83'; Al-Shamrani (red card) 90+5' | Stadium: Al-Batin Club Stadium; Attendance: 1,873; Referee: Khaled Al-Teris |

| 3 February 2019 18 | Al-Faisaly | 1–2 | Al-Hazem | Al Majma'ah |
| 15:40 | Hyland (yellow card) 20'; Al-Sowayed (yellow card) 30'; Denílson 55' | Report | Al-Barakah (yellow card) 2'; Al-Saiari (yellow card) 21'; Alemão (yellow card) 66'; Bakhit (yellow card) 71'; Pajoy 79'; Rodolfo (yellow card) 79'; Al-Khalaf 90+3' | Stadium: King Salman Sport City Stadium; Attendance: 561; Referee: Paweł Gil (Poland) |

| 7 February 2019 19 | Ohod | 4–1 | Al-Faisaly | Medina |
| 18:50 | Attiyah 2'; Hawsawi (yellow card) 19'; Otaif 45+3', (yellow card) 88'; Gomaa 47'; Al-Dhaw (yellow card) 51'; Teikeu (yellow card) 66', (goal) 76' | Report | Al-Shamrani 45+5'; Mendash (yellow card) 85' | Stadium: Prince Mohammed bin Abdul Aziz Stadium; Attendance: 2,189; Referee: Shukri Al-Hanfoush |

| 13 February 2019 20 | Al-Ettifaq | 3–4 | Al-Faisaly | Dammam |
| 18:10 | Kiss (yellow card) 5'; Guanca 20', 32'; Al-Robeai (yellow card) 45+1'; Al-Kwikbi 74'; Al-Sonain (yellow card) 90+4'; Al-Habib (yellow card) 90+6' | Report | Al Ansari 45+2', 90+5'; Denílson 87' (pen.); Luisinho 90+9' | Stadium: Prince Mohamed bin Fahd Stadium; Attendance: 1,968; Referee: Bartosz Frankowski (Poland) |

| 23 February 2019 21 | Al-Raed | 0–3 | Al-Faisaly | Buraidah |
| 15:55 | | Report | Mendash 32', (yellow card) 84'; Al Ansari (yellow card) 38'; Al-Bakr 43'; Denílson 90+3' | Stadium: King Abdullah Sport City Stadium; Attendance: 1,738; Referee: Danny Makkelie (Netherlands) |

| 1 March 2019 22 | Al-Hilal | 2–1 | Al-Faisaly | Riyadh |
| 18:35 | Giovinco 18', 79'; Degenek (yellow card) 47'; Al-Shahrani (red card) 90+4' | Report | Hyland (yellow card) 40'; Igor Rossi 49' | Stadium: King Saud University Stadium; Attendance: 22,688; Referee: Bakary Gassama (Gambia) |

| 7 March 2019 23 | Al-Shabab | 2–1 | Al-Faisaly | Riyadh |
| 18:40 | Trawally 17'; Boussoufa 75'; Budescu (yellow card) 86'; Luiz Antônio (yellow card) 88'; Sebá (yellow card) 90+3' | Report | Luisinho (yellow card) 45', (goal) 82' (pen.); Igor Rossi (yellow card) 77' | Stadium: Prince Faisal bin Fahd Stadium; Attendance: 1,302; Referee: Pol van Boekel (Netherlands) |

| 14 March 2019 24 | Al-Faisaly | 3–0 | Al-Qadsiah | Al Majma'ah |
| 18:45 | Al Ansari (yellow card) 45+1'; Mendash 56'; Luisinho 82'; Denílson 86', (yellow card) 87' | Report | | Stadium: King Salman Sport City Stadium; Attendance: 511; Referee: Damir Skomina (Slovenia) |

| 29 March 2019 25 | Al-Faisaly | 3–2 | Al-Ittihad | Al Majma'ah |
| 18:55 | Igor Rossi (yellow card) 22'; Mendash 42'; Al-Shamrani 69'; Luisinho 90+1' | Report | da Costa 20'; Rodrigues 31'; El Ahmadi (yellow card) 33' | Stadium: King Salman Sport City Stadium; Attendance: 862; Referee: Pavel Královec (Czech Republic) |

| 5 April 2019 26 | Al-Faisaly | 1–1 | Al-Fateh | Al Majma'ah |
| 18:55 | Luisinho 42' | Report | Al-Zaqaan 38'; Korzun (yellow card) 55'; Al-Juhaim (yellow card) 59'; Al-Fuhaid (yellow card) 68' | Stadium: King Salman Sport City Stadium; Attendance: 536; Referee: Matthew Conger (New Zealand) |

| 12 April 2019 27 | Al-Wehda | 1–2 | Al-Faisaly | Mecca |
| 20:45 | Al-Qarni (yellow card) 39'; Otero 56' (pen.); Darwish (yellow card) 62' | Report | Khrees (yellow card) 54'; Denílson 77', 83'; Luisinho (yellow card) 90+3' | Stadium: King Abdul Aziz Stadium; Attendance: 437; Referee: Mohammed Al-Hoaish |

| 20 April 2019 28 | Al-Fayha | 3–4 | Al-Faisaly | Al Majma'ah |
| 20:30 | Asprilla 13', 44' (pen.); Al-Khaibari (yellow card) 23'; Gegé (yellow card) 47'; Al-Barakah (yellow card) 57'; Fallatah (yellow card) 66'; Besara 69' | Report | Rogerinho 5', 25'; Puljić 16', 90+7'; Rossi (yellow card) 43'; Calderón (yellow card) 82'; Hyland (yellow card) 88' | Stadium: King Salman Sport City Stadium; Attendance: 1,707; Referee: Viktor Kassai (Hungary) |

| 11 May 2019 29 | Al-Faisaly | 1–4 | Al-Ahli | Al-Majma'ah |
| 22:30 | Calderón 48' | Report | Stanciu 11'; Asiri 31'; Baeza (yellow card) 47'; Al Fatil (yellow card) 51'; Djaniny 59'; Alhaj 90+1' | Stadium: King Salman Sport City Stadium; Attendance: 503; Referee: Turki Al-Khudhayr |

| 16 May 2019 30 | Al-Taawoun | 2–1 | Al-Faisaly | Buraidah |
| 22:30 | Al-Hussain 35'; Tawamba 39'; Al-Mofarij (yellow card) 53'; Amissi (yellow card) 69'; Petrolina (yellow card) 89' | Report | Calderón 25'; Luisinho (yellow card) 45+6'; Puljić (yellow card) 64'; Al-Sowayed (yellow card) 86' | Stadium: King Abdullah Sport City Stadium; Attendance: 1,500; Referee: Anastasios Sidiropoulos (Greece) |

=== King Cup ===
All times are local, AST (UTC+3).

| 2 January 2019 Round of 64 | Al-Faisaly | 2–0 | Afif | Al Majma'ah |
| 18:00 | Akpala 5'; Calderón 27'; Al-Thani (yellow card) 72' | Report | | Stadium: King Salman Sport City Stadium; Referee: Shukri Al-Hanfoush |

| 15 January 2019 Round of 32 | Al-Khaleej | 1–2 (a.e.t.) | Al-Faisaly | Dammam |
| 15:10 | Al-Trais (yellow card) 53'; Al-Qeed 68'; Al-Motawaa (yellow card) 70'; Al-Hamdhi (yellow card) 94'; Al-Nashi (yellow card) 116' | Report | Abousaban (yellow card) 65'; Calderón 80'; Al Ansari 105+1'; Hyland (yellow card) 116' | Stadium: Prince Mohamed bin Fahd Stadium; Referee: Raed Al-Zahrani |

| 21 January 2019 Round of 16 | Al-Hilal | 3–2 | Al-Faisaly | Riyadh |
| 20:05 | Gomis 19'; Carlos Eduardo (yellow card) 33'; Al-Dawsari 79'; Rivas 83' | Report | Rogerinho 2', 37'; Mendash (yellow card) 31'; Al-Sowayed (yellow card) 41'; Malayekah (yellow card) 89' | Stadium: King Saud University Stadium; Referee: Milorad Mažić (Serbia) |

== Statistics ==
=== Squad statistics ===
Last updated on 16 May 2019.

| No. | Pos | Nat | Player | Total | | Pro League | | King Cup | |
| No. | Pos | Nat | Player | Apps | Goals | Apps | Goals | Apps | Goals |
Goalkeepers
| 26 | GK | (Saudi Arabia) | Mustafa Malayekah | 31 | 0 | 30 | 0 | 1 | 0 |
| 28 | GK | (Saudi Arabia) | Ahmed Al-Kassar | 2 | 0 | 0 | 0 | 2 | 0 |
Defenders
| 2 | DF | (Saudi Arabia) | Yazeed Al-Bakr | 26 | 1 | 22+2 | 1 | 1+1 | 0 |
| 3 | DF | (Brazil) | Igor Rossi | 29 | 4 | 27 | 4 | 2 | 0 |
| 5 | DF | (Saudi Arabia) | Hussein Hawsawi | 3 | 0 | 3 | 0 | 0 | 0 |
| 7 | DF | (Saudi Arabia) | Wesam Al-Sowayed | 14 | 0 | 7+4 | 0 | 3 | 0 |
| 21 | DF | (Saudi Arabia) | Ageel Balghaith | 21 | 0 | 16+2 | 0 | 3 | 0 |
| 27 | DF | (Saudi Arabia) | Hamdan Al-Shamrani | 26 | 3 | 24+2 | 3 | 0 | 0 |
| 33 | DF | (Saudi Arabia) | Awadh Khrees | 5 | 0 | 3+1 | 0 | 1 | 0 |
| 66 | DF | (Croatia) | Ante Puljić | 22 | 3 | 19+2 | 3 | 1 | 0 |
Midfielders
| 4 | MF | (Kuwait) | Fahad Al Ansari | 30 | 4 | 25+2 | 3 | 2+1 | 1 |
| 6 | MF | (Saudi Arabia) | Omar Abdulaziz | 13 | 0 | 4+8 | 0 | 1 | 0 |
| 8 | MF | (Brazil) | Luisinho | 26 | 7 | 18+6 | 7 | 2 | 0 |
| 9 | MF | (Brazil) | Rogerinho | 31 | 10 | 28 | 8 | 3 | 2 |
| 10 | MF | (Saudi Arabia) | Hussain Al-Qahtani | 17 | 1 | 3+11 | 1 | 0+3 | 0 |
| 14 | MF | (Saudi Arabia) | Bader Bashir | 6 | 0 | 1+3 | 0 | 1+1 | 0 |
| 20 | MF | (Saudi Arabia) | Mohammed Al-Thani | 4 | 0 | 0+3 | 0 | 0+1 | 0 |
| 23 | MF | (Saudi Arabia) | Mohammed Abousaban | 9 | 0 | 3+5 | 0 | 1 | 0 |
| 24 | MF | (Saudi Arabia) | Ahmed Al-Anzi | 0 | 0 | 0 | 0 | 0 | 0 |
| 47 | MF | (Saudi Arabia) | Sultan Mendash | 24 | 3 | 13+8 | 3 | 2+1 | 0 |
| 49 | MF | (Saudi Arabia) | Abdullah Al-Qahtani | 0 | 0 | 0 | 0 | 0 | 0 |
| 80 | MF | (Saudi Arabia) | Riyadh Sharahili | 0 | 0 | 0 | 0 | 0 | 0 |
| 88 | MF | (Trinidad and Tobago) | Khaleem Hyland | 30 | 0 | 28 | 0 | 2 | 0 |
Forwards
| 18 | FW | (Colombia) | Diego Calderón | 32 | 9 | 25+4 | 7 | 3 | 2 |
| 22 | FW | (Brazil) | Denílson | 12 | 6 | 7+3 | 6 | 1+1 | 0 |
Players sent out on loan this season
| 15 | FW | (Saudi Arabia) | Ramzi Solan | 0 | 0 | 0 | 0 | 0 | 0 |
| 19 | FW | (Saudi Arabia) | Mohammed Majrashi | 7 | 1 | 4+3 | 1 | 0 | 0 |
Player who made an appearance this season but have left the club
| 11 | MF | (Saudi Arabia) | Abdulaziz Al-Bishi | 13 | 2 | 13 | 2 | 0 | 0 |
| 17 | FW | (Nigeria) | Joseph Akpala | 15 | 3 | 7+7 | 2 | 1 | 1 |
| 24 | DF | (Saudi Arabia) | Jamaan Al-Dossari | 1 | 0 | 0+1 | 0 | 0 | 0 |
| 24 | MF | (Saudi Arabia) | Omar Al-Sohaymi | 0 | 0 | 0 | 0 | 0 | 0 |
| 31 | GK | (Saudi Arabia) | Khalid Sharahili | 0 | 0 | 0 | 0 | 0 | 0 |

=== Goalscorers ===
| Rank | No. | Pos | Nat | Name | Pro League | King Cup | Total |
|---|---|---|---|---|---|---|---|
| 1 | 9 | MF | (Brazil) | Rogerinho | 8 | 2 | 10 |
| 2 | 18 | FW | (Colombia) | Diego Calderón | 7 | 2 | 9 |
| 3 | 8 | MF | (Brazil) | Luisinho | 7 | 0 | 7 |
| 4 | 22 | FW | (Brazil) | Denílson | 6 | 0 | 6 |
| 5 | 3 | DF | (Brazil) | Igor Rossi | 4 | 0 | 4 |
| 5 | 4 | MF | (Kuwait) | Fahad Al Ansari | 3 | 1 | 4 |
| 7 | 17 | FW | (Nigeria) | Joseph Akpala | 2 | 1 | 3 |
| 7 | 27 | DF | (Saudi Arabia) | Hamdan Al-Shamrani | 3 | 0 | 3 |
| 7 | 47 | MF | (Saudi Arabia) | Sultan Mendash | 3 | 0 | 3 |
| 7 | 66 | DF | (Croatia) | Ante Puljić | 3 | 0 | 3 |
| 11 | 11 | MF | (Saudi Arabia) | Abdulaziz Al-Bishi | 2 | 0 | 2 |
| 12 | 2 | DF | (Saudi Arabia) | Yazeed Al-Bakr | 1 | 0 | 1 |
| 12 | 10 | MF | (Saudi Arabia) | Hussain Al-Qahtani | 1 | 0 | 1 |
| 12 | 19 | FW | (Saudi Arabia) | Mohammed Majrashi | 1 | 0 | 1 |
| Own goal | | | | | 0 | 0 | 0 |
| Total | | | | | 51 | 6 | 57 |

Last Updated: 16 May 2019

=== Assists ===
| Rank | No. | Pos | Nat | Name | Pro League | King Cup | Total |
|---|---|---|---|---|---|---|---|
| 1 | 8 | MF | (Brazil) | Luisinho | 8 | 0 | 8 |
| 2 | 9 | MF | (Brazil) | Rogerinho | 5 | 0 | 5 |
| 2 | 47 | MF | (Saudi Arabia) | Sultan Mendash | 4 | 1 | 5 |
| 4 | 4 | MF | (Kuwait) | Fahad Al Ansari | 3 | 1 | 4 |
| 4 | 18 | FW | (Colombia) | Diego Calderón | 4 | 0 | 4 |
| 6 | 88 | MF | (Trinidad and Tobago) | Khaleem Hyland | 2 | 1 | 3 |
| 7 | 27 | DF | (Saudi Arabia) | Hamdan Al-Shamrani | 2 | 0 | 2 |
| 8 | 6 | MF | (Saudi Arabia) | Omar Abdulaziz | 1 | 0 | 1 |
| 8 | 7 | DF | (Saudi Arabia) | Wesam Al-Sowayed | 1 | 0 | 1 |
| 8 | 11 | MF | (Saudi Arabia) | Abdulaziz Al-Bishi | 1 | 0 | 1 |
| 8 | 14 | MF | (Saudi Arabia) | Bader Bashir | 1 | 0 | 1 |
| 8 | 17 | FW | (Nigeria) | Joseph Akpala | 1 | 0 | 1 |
| 8 | 21 | DF | (Saudi Arabia) | Ageel Balghaith | 1 | 0 | 1 |
| 8 | 22 | FW | (Brazil) | Denílson | 1 | 0 | 1 |
| Total | | | | | 34 | 4 | 38 |

Last Updated: 20 April 2019

=== Clean sheets ===
| Rank | No. | Pos | Nat | Name | Pro League | King Cup | Total |
|---|---|---|---|---|---|---|---|
| 1 | 26 | GK | (Saudi Arabia) | Mustafa Malayekah | 7 | 0 | 7 |
| 2 | 28 | GK | (Saudi Arabia) | Ahmed Al-Kassar | 0 | 1 | 1 |
| Total | | | | | 7 | 1 | 8 |

Last Updated: 14 March 2019
