= Mustafa Malayekah =

Saudi Arabian footballer

Personal information
- Full name: Mustafa Redha Malayekah
- Date of birth: 21 May 1986 (age 40)
- Place of birth: Medina, Saudi Arabia
- Height: 1.84 m (6 ft 0 in)
- Position: Goalkeeper

Youth career
- Al-Ansar

Senior career*
Years	Team	Apps	(Gls)
2004–2006	Al-Ansar	25	(0)
2006–2011	Al-Ittihad	3	(0)
2012–2016	Hajer	104	(0)
2016–2022	Al-Faisaly	144	(1)
2022–2024	Al-Fateh	5	(0)
2024	→ Al-Shabab (loan)	9	(0)
2024–2026	Neom	31	(0)

International career^{‡}
2004–2006	Saudi Arabia U20		
2007–2008	Saudi Arabia U23		
2006–2019	Saudi Arabia	4	(0)
- * Club domestic league appearances and goals as of 22:47, 27 May 2024 (UTC) ‡ National team caps and goals as of 22:55, 10 August 2019 (UTC)

Mustafa Malayekah (Arabic: مصطفى ملائكة; born 21 May 1986) is a Saudi Arabian football player who currently plays as a goalkeeper.

He made his debut with Al-Ansar in the Saudi Premier League in 2004 and then transferred to Al-Ittihad in 2006. In 2012, he joined Hajer where he spent five seasons before joining Al-Faisaly in 2016.

He was first called up to the Saudi Arabia national team in January 2006 where he was an unused substitute in the friendly against Sweden. He was then called up for the preliminary squad in preparation for the 2006 FIFA World Cup. However, Malayekah failed to make the final squad. 12 years later, Malayekah finally made his debut for the national team in the friendly against Brazil when he came off the bench in the 83rd minute.

== Career ==
Malayekah started his career at his hometown club Al-Ansar and made his debut for the first team in 2004. On 24 February 2006, it was announced that Malayekah had signed a contract with Al-Ittihad for a reported fee of SAR4.5 million. He would join Al-Ittihad at the beginning of the 2006–07 season. On 9 February 2007, Malayekah started the Prince Faisal bin Fahd Cup final against derby rivals Al-Ahli which Al-Ittihad went on to lose 3–0. He was sent off in the 62nd minute. On 10 May 2007, Malayekah made his league debut for Al-Ittihad in the match against Al-Faisaly. On 29 December 2011, Malayekah joined Hajer on a six-month contract. He made his debut on 31 December, in the league match against Al-Hilal. On 21 April 2012, Malayekah renewed his contract with Hajer for another two seasons. On 4 April 2014, Malayekah achieved promotion to the Pro League with Hajer just one season after being relegated. He renewed his contract with Hajer for another year. On 8 May 2015, Malayekah once again renewed his contract with Hajer for another year.

Following Hajer's relegation to the First Division, Malayekah joined Al-Faisaly on a free transfer. He signed a three-year contract with the club. In his first season, Malayekah made 21 appearances in all competitions as Al-Faisaly finished 9th. In his second season, Malayekah started all 26 league games for Al-Faisaly as they finished 6th. He also made four appearances in the King Cup including the final, which they went on to lose. On 19 January 2019, Malayekah renewed his contract with Al-Faisaly for another three years. On 15 February 2020, Malayekah scored a stoppage time equalizer against Al-Fateh when he headed in Youssef El Jebli's corner kick. He made 28 appearances in the league as Al-Faisaly finished 5th, their highest ever finish in the top flight.

On 11 July 2022, Malayekah joined Al-Fateh on a free transfer following Al-Faisaly's relegation. On 30 January 2024, Malayekah joined Al-Shabab on a six-month loan.

On 3 July 2024, Malayekah joined Saudi First Division League side Neom.

== Career statistics ==
=== Club ===
As of match played 30 May 2024

Appearances and goals by club, season and competition
Club	Season	League			National Cup (Note: Includes King Cup)		League Cup (Note: Include Crown Prince Cup)		Continental (Note: Includes AFC Champions League)		Other		Total	
Club	Season	Division	Apps	Goals	Apps	Goals	Apps	Goals	Apps	Goals	Apps	Goals	Apps	Goals
Al-Ansar	2004–05	Premier League	18	0	—		1	0	—		4 (Note: Appearances in Prince Faisal bin Fahd Cup)	0	23	0
Al-Ansar	2005–06	Premier League	7	0	—		1	0	—		5	0	13	0
Al-Ansar	Total		25	0	0	0	2	0	0	0	9	0	36	0
Al-Ittihad	2006–07	Premier League	1	0	—		0	0	—		3	0	4	0
Al-Ittihad	2007–08	Premier League	0	0	0	0	0	0	0	0	2	0	2	0
Al-Ittihad	2008–09	Pro League	0	0	0	0	0	0	0	0	0	0	0	0
Al-Ittihad	2009–10	Pro League	0	0	0	0	0	0	0	0	3	0	3	0
Al-Ittihad	2010–11	Pro League	1	0	0	0	0	0	0	0	—		1	0
Al-Ittihad	2011–12	Pro League	1	0	0	0	0	0	0	0	—		1	0
Al-Ittihad	Total		3	0	0	0	0	0	0	0	8	0	11	0
Hajer	2011–12	Pro League	13	0	—		0	0	—		—		13	0
Hajer	2012–13	Pro League	16	0	—		1	0	—		—		17	0
Hajer	2013–14	First Division	28	0	0	0	1	0	—		—		29	0
Hajer	2014–15	Pro League	25	0	0	0	2	0	—		—		27	0
Hajer	2015–16	Pro League	22	0	0	0	2	0	—		—		24	0
Hajer	Total		104	0	0	0	6	0	0	0	0	0	110	0
Al-Faisaly	2016–17	Pro League	17	0	4	0	0	0	—		—		21	0
Al-Faisaly	2017–18	Pro League	26	0	4	0	1	0	—		—		31	0
Al-Faisaly	2018–19	Pro League	30	0	1	0	—		—		3 (Note: Appearances in Arab Club Champions Cup)	0	34	0
Al-Faisaly	2019–20	Pro League	28	1	2	0	—		—		—		30	1
Al-Faisaly	2020–21	Pro League	27	0	0	0	—		—		—		27	0
Al-Faisaly	2021–22	Pro League	16	0	1	0	—		5	0	1 (Note: Appearances in Saudi Super Cup)	0	23	0
Al-Faisaly	Total		144	1	12	0	1	0	5	0	4	0	166	1
Al-Fateh	2022–23	Pro League	4	0	0	0	—		—		—		4	0
Al-Fateh	2023–24	Pro League	1	0	0	0	—		—		—		1	0
Al-Fateh	Total		5	0	0	0	0	0	0	0	0	0	5	0
Al-Shabab (loan)	2023–24	Pro League	9	0	0	0	—		—		—		9	0
Career total			290	1	12	0	9	0	5	0	21	0	337	1

== Honours ==
=== Club ===
Al-Ittihad

- Saudi Premier League/Saudi Pro League: 2006–07, 2008–09
- King Cup: 2010

Hajer

- Saudi First Division: 2013–14

Al-Faisaly

- King Cup: 2020–21

=== Individual ===
- Saudi Professional League Goalkeeper of the Month: February 2022
