= Hussain Al-Qahtani =

Saudi Arabian footballer (born 1994)

Hussain Al-Qahtani حسين القحطاني
Personal information
- Full name: Hussain Massoud Al Monassar Al-Qahtani
- Date of birth: 20 December 1994 (age 31)
- Place of birth: Khamis Mushait, Saudi Arabia
- Height: 1.77 m (5 ft 10 in)
- Position: Midfielder

Team information
- Current team: Al-Diriyah
- Number: 52

Youth career
- –2016: Al-Hilal
- 2016–2018: Al-Faisaly

Senior career*
Years	Team	Apps	(Gls)
2015–2016	Al-Hilal	0	(0)
2017–2020	Al-Faisaly	38	(1)
2020–2024	Al-Shabab	109	(4)
2024–2026	Al-Qadsiah	29	(0)
2026–	Al-Diriyah	17	(1)

International career^{‡}
2014–2017	Saudi Arabia U23		
2023–	Saudi Arabia	2	(0)
- * Club domestic league appearances and goals as of 25 August 2026 ‡ National team caps and goals as of 28 March 2023

Hussain Al-Qahtani (Arabic: حسين القحطاني, born 20 December 1994) is a Saudi Arabian professional footballer who plays as a midfielder for Saudi Pro League club Al-Diriyah and the Saudi Arabia national team.

== Career ==
Al-Qahtani began his career at the youth team of Al-Hilal. On 6 February 2015, Al-Qahtani signed his first professional contract with the club. He made his first-team debut for Al-Hilal in the King Cup round of 32 against Al-Jeel. He came off the bench replacing Thiago Neves in the 71st minute. He was the captain of the U23 team during his last season with the club. He joined Al-Faisaly's youth team on 22 August 2016.

On 12 May 2017, Al-Qahtani signed his first professional contract with Al-Faisaly. He made his debut with Al-Faisaly on 7 April 2018 during the league match against Al-Batin. On 27 April 2018, Al-Qahtani helped Al-Faisaly's U23 team win their first-ever U23 league title.

On 6 January 2020, Al-Qahtani signed a pre-contract agreement with Al-Shabab and joined the club following the conclusion of the 2019–20 season. On 30 May 2024, Al-Qahtani joined Al-Qadsiah on a three-year contract. On 3 February 2026, Al-Qahtani joined Al-Diriyah.

== Career statistics ==
=== Club ===
As of match played 31 May 2024

Club	Season	League		King Cup		Asia		Other		Total	
Club	Season	Apps	Goals	Apps	Goals	Apps	Goals	Apps	Goals	Apps	Goals
Al-Hilal	2014–15	0	0	1	0	0	0	0	0	1	0
Al-Faisaly	2017–18	1	0	0	0	—		2 (Note: Appearances in Arab Club Champions Cup)	0	1	0
Al-Faisaly	2018–19	14	1	3	0	—		—		19	1
Al-Faisaly	2019–20	23	0	3	0	—		—		26	0
Al-Faisaly	Total	38	1	6	0	0	0	2	0	46	1
Al-Shabab	2020–21	25	0	0	0	—		2	0	27	0
Al-Shabab	2021–22	29	1	3	0	6	1	—		38	2
Al-Shabab	2022–23	26	2	0	0	2	1	4	0	32	3
Al-Shabab	2023–24	29	1	3	0	—		5	0	37	1
Al-Shabab	Total	109	4	6	0	8	2	11	0	134	6
Career totals		147	5	13	0	8	2	13	0	181	7
