= Khalid Al-Ghamdi =

Saudi Arabian footballer

Personal information
- Full name: Khalid Ahmad Hasan Al-Ghamdi
- Date of birth: March 28, 1988 (age 38)
- Place of birth: Khobar, Saudi Arabia
- Height: 1.72 m (5 ft 7 1/2 in)
- Position: Right back

Senior career*
Years	Team	Apps	(Gls)
2009–2011	Al-Qadsiah	25	(0)
2011–2019	Al-Nassr	130	(0)
2019	→ Al-Raed (loan)	4	(0)
2019–2020	Al-Faisaly	23	(3)
2020–2023	Al-Shabab	6	(0)
Total		188	(3)

International career
2012	Saudi Arabia	2	(0)
- * Club domestic league appearances and goals as of 31 May 2023

Khalid Al-Ghamdi (Arabic: خالد الغامدي; born 28 March 1988) is a Saudi Arabian former professional footballer who played as a right back. He started his career at Al-Qadsiah before joining Al-Nassr in 2011. He also played for Al-Raed, Al-Faisaly, and Al-Shabab. On 23 June 2023, it was announced that Al-Ghamdi had retired from football and was appointed as part of Al-Shabab's backroom staff.

== Career statistics ==
=== Club ===
As of match played 30 May 2023

Appearances and goals by club, season and competition
Club	Season	League			King Cup		Crown Prince Cup		Asia		Other		Total	
Club	Season	Division	Apps	Goals	Apps	Goals	Apps	Goals	Apps	Goals	Apps	Goals	Apps	Goals
Al-Qadsiah	2009–10	Pro League	1	0	—		1	0	—		—		2	0
Al-Qadsiah	2010–11	Pro League	24	0	—		1	0	—		—		25	0
Al-Qadsiah	Total		25	0	0	0	2	0	0	0	0	0	27	0
Al-Nassr	2011–12	Pro League	21	0	5	0	2	0	—		—		28	0
Al-Nassr	2012–13	Pro League	21	0	2	0	1	0	—		3 (Note: Appearances in Arab Club Champions Cup)	1	27	1
Al-Nassr	2013–14	Pro League	17	0	1	0	2	0	—		—		20	0
Al-Nassr	2014–15	Pro League	17	0	3	0	3	0	5	0	1 (Note: Appearance in Saudi Super Cup)	0	20	0
Al-Nassr	2015–16	Pro League	18	0	4	0	2	0	6	0	1	0	31	0
Al-Nassr	2016–17	Pro League	24	0	3	1	4	0	—		—		31	1
Al-Nassr	2017–18	Pro League	12	0	1	0	—		—		3	0	16	0
Al-Nassr	Total		130	0	19	1	14	0	11	0	8	1	182	2
Al-Raed (loan)	2018–19	Pro League	4	0	0	0	—		—		—		4	0
Al-Faisaly	2019–20	Pro League	23	3	2	0	—		—		—		25	3
Al-Shabab	2020–21	Pro League	2	0	0	0	—		—		0	0	2	0
Al-Shabab	2021–22	Pro League	1	0	0	0	—		3	0	—		4	0
Al-Shabab	2022–23	Pro League	3	0	0	0	—		0	0	2	0	5	0
Al-Shabab	Total		6	0	0	0	0	0	3	0	2	0	11	0
Career total			188	3	21	1	16	0	14	0	10	1	249	5

== Honours ==
=== Club ===
Al-Nassr

- Saudi Professional League: 2013–14, 2014–15
- Saudi Crown Prince Cup: 2013–14
