= Hussein Hawsawi =

Saudi Arabian footballer

Hussein Hawsawi حسين هوساوي
Personal information
- Full name: Hussein Fayez Hawsawi
- Date of birth: 22 January 1998 (age 28)
- Place of birth: Saudi Arabia
- Position: Defender

Team information
- Current team: Al-Saqer
- Number: 3

Youth career
- –2018: Al-Faisaly

Senior career*
Years	Team	Apps	(Gls)
2018–2020	Al-Faisaly	3	(0)
2019–2020	→ Al-Taqadom (loan)	3	(0)
2020–2021	Al-Jabalain	26	(0)
2021–2023	Jeddah	31	(1)
2023–2024	Al-Ain	13	(0)
2024–2025	Najran		
2025–	Al-Saqer		
- * Club domestic league appearances and goals

Hussein Hawsawi (Arabic: حسين هوساوي, born 22 January 1998) is a Saudi Arabian professional footballer who plays as a defender for Al-Saqer.

== Career ==
Hawsawi started his career at Al-Faisaly and is a product of Al-Faisaly's youth system. On 21 September 2018, Hawsawi made his professional debut for Al-Faisaly against Ohod in the Pro League. On 15 July 2019, left Al-Faisaly and joined Al-Taqadom on a one-year loan. On 29 September, left Al-Faisaly and joined Al-Jabalain in a permanent deal.

On 28 July 2023, Hawsawi joined Al-Ain. On 11 September 2024, Hawsawi joined Najran. On 25 August 2025, Hawsawi joined Al-Saqer.

== Career statistics ==
=== Club ===
As of 20 September 2020.

Club	Season	League		King Cup		Asia		Other		Total	
Club	Season	Apps	Goals	Apps	Goals	Apps	Goals	Apps	Goals	Apps	Goals
Al-Faisaly	2018–19	3	0	0	0	—			—	3	0
Al-Faisaly	Total	3	0	0	0	0	0	0	0	3	0
Al-Taqadom (loan)	2019–20	3	0	0	0	—		—		3	0
Career totals		6	0	0	0	0	0	0	0	6	0
