= Roly Bonevacia =

Curaçao footballer (born 1991)

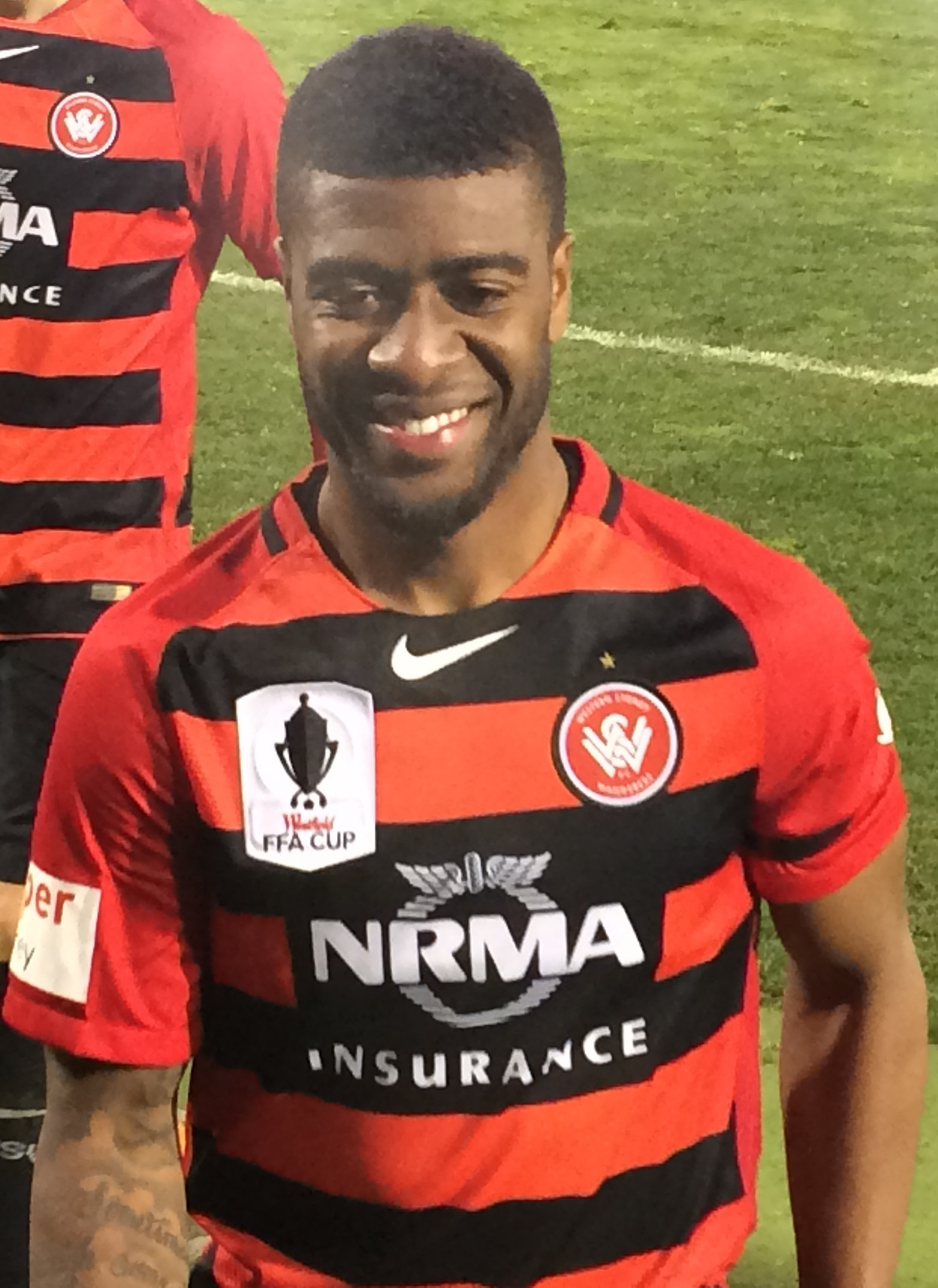
- Bonevacia with Western Sydney in 2017

Personal information
- Full name: Rolieny Nonato Luis Bonevacia
- Date of birth: 8 October 1991 (age 35)
- Place of birth: Lelystad, Netherlands
- Height: 1.71 m (5 ft 7 in)
- Position: Defensive midfielder

Youth career
- VV Reiger Boys
- 2001–2010: Ajax

Senior career*
Years	Team	Apps	(Gls)
2010–2013	Ajax	1	(0)
2011–2012	→ NAC (loan)	17	(0)
2013	→ Roda JC (loan)	16	(1)
2013–2014	Roda JC	23	(0)
2014–2017	Wellington Phoenix	80	(14)
2017–2019	Western Sydney Wanderers	44	(8)
2019–2020	Al-Faisaly	22	(2)
2020–2021	Al-Fujairah	11	(1)
2021–2023	Al Tadhamon	?	(8)
2024	Melbourne Victory	11	(1)
2024–2026	Sreenidi Deccan	17	(0)

International career^{‡}
2007–2008	Netherlands U17	9	(0)
2009–2010	Netherlands U19	3	(0)
2019–	Curaçao	17	(1)
- * Club domestic league appearances and goals as of 23:11, 5 April 2025 (UTC) ‡ National team caps and goals as of 21 November 2023

Rolieny Nonato Luis Bonevacia (born 8 October 1991) is a professional footballer who plays as a midfielder. He has played international football at youth level for the Netherlands, while at senior level he represents Curaçao, making his first official appearance for them in June 2019.

== Club career ==
Bonevacia was born in Lelystad and started playing football with VV Reiger Boys in Heerhugowaard, North Holland. Different professional clubs were interested in signing the youngster, including AZ and AFC Ajax, for whom he finally signed his first youth contract in the summer of 2001. Until 2010, Bonevacia played in the Ajax Academy, first as a central defender and later as a defensive midfielder. In July 2008, Bonevacia signed his first professional contract for Ajax, a three-year deal until 2011. He was considered to be a top prospect at Ajax.

=== Ajax ===
At the beginning of the 2010–11 season, Bonevacia was added to Ajax's senior squad by manager Martin Jol. He made his Eredivisie debut in the starting line-up on 14 August 2010 in a 4–2 victory over Vitesse at the Amsterdam ArenA. His second appearance came on 22 September 2010 in the KNVB Cup where he started and played the full 90 minutes in the 5–0 win against MVV Maastricht at home.

Bonevacia made no further appearances for the first team following the resignation of Martin Jol, and was loaned out to NAC Breda the following season.

=== NAC Breda ===
In the summer of 2011, Bonevacia was sent on loan to NAC Breda until the end of the season. He played 17 matches in the Eredivisie. At the end of the 2011–12 season, he returned to Ajax, where he attempted to earn a regular place in the first team.

=== Roda JC Kerkrade ===
After only making two regular season appearances for Ajax under then coach Martin Jol and making no further appearances during the 2012–13 season, except in pre-season in friendly encounters, Bonevacia was sent on loan to Roda JC Kerkrade until the end of the 2012–13 season. Following his loan spell, Roly Bonevacia signed a two-year contract with Roda JC, binding him to the club from Limburg until the summer of 2015.

=== Wellington Phoenix ===
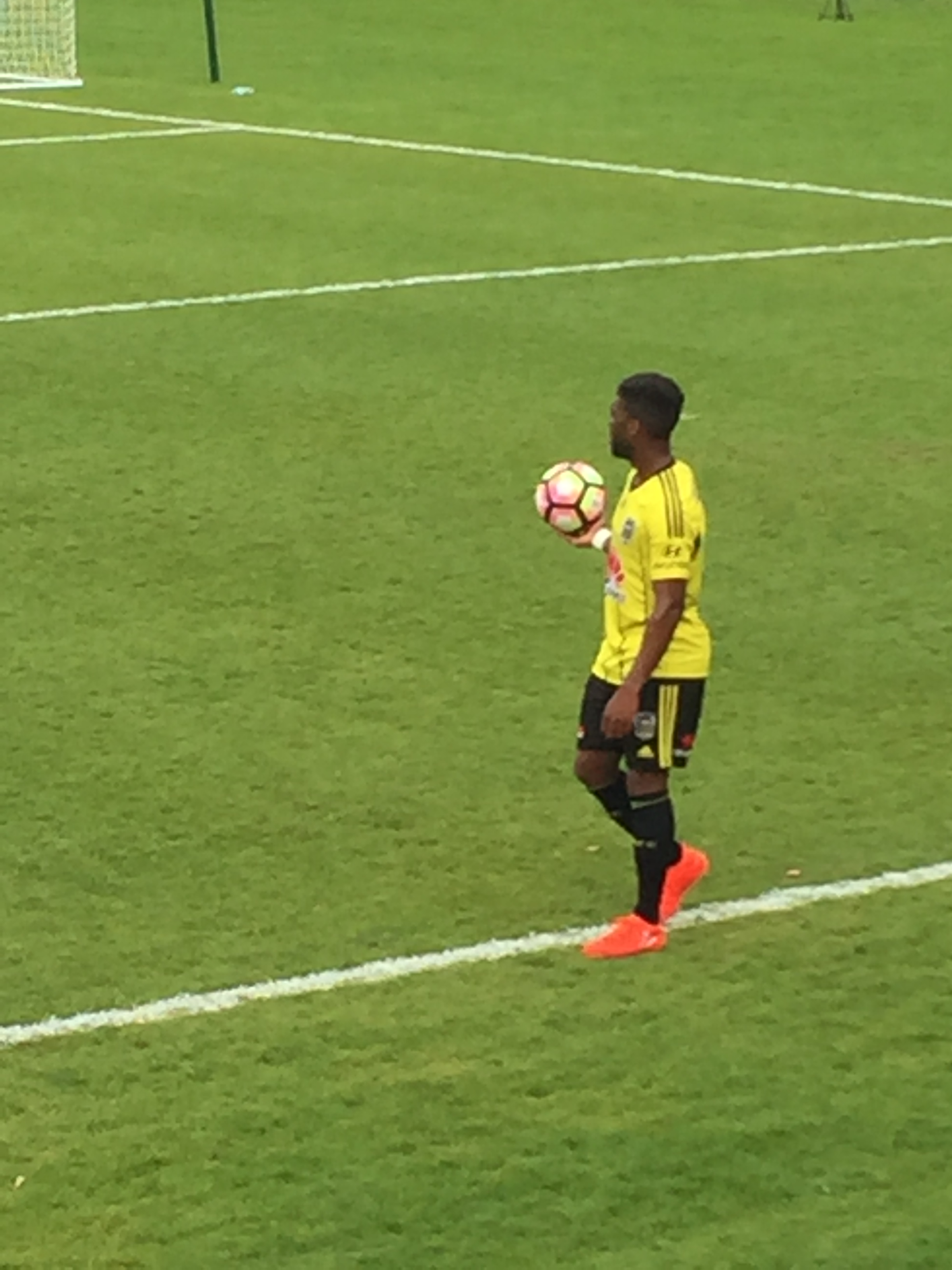
Bonevacia playing for Wellington in 2016

On 25 July 2014, Bonevacia signed for New Zealand club Wellington Phoenix in the A-League on a two-year deal. He re-signed with the Wellington Phoenix until 2016–17.

=== Western Sydney Wanderers ===
On 16 May 2017, Bonevacia signed for Australian club Western Sydney Wanderers who also play in the A-League on a two-year deal.

=== Al-Faisaly FC ===
On 12 May 2019, Al-Faisaly signed Bonevacia for one season from Western Sydney Wanderers.

=== Fujairah FC ===
On 4 August 2020, Al-Fujairah signed Bonevacia for one season from Al-Faisaly.

=== Al Tadhamon SC ===
On 16 July 2021, Al Tadhamon signed Bonevacia for one seasons from Al-Fujairah.

=== Melbourne Victory ===
On 6 February 2024, Bonevacia returned to the A-League for the first time since the 2018–19 season, signing with Melbourne Victory for the remainder of the 2023–24 season.

=== Sreenidi Deccan ===
On 28 August 2024, Indian I-League side Sreenidi Deccan announced that the club roped in Bonevacia on a one-year deal.

== International career ==
=== Netherlands youth teams ===
Bonevacia was a member of the Dutch squad at the 2008 UEFA European Under-17 Football Championship, having also represented the U-17 Oranje in the qualification rounds for the tournament.

Since 2009, Bonevacia has represented the Netherlands U-19 team in the qualification rounds for the 2010 UEFA European Under-19 Football Championship. He made his debut for the team in a match against Cyprus, and also played in qualification matches against the Czech Republic and Malta.

=== Curaçao ===
In April 2015, Bonevacia expressed a desire to potentially represent Curaçao, the country of his parents' birth. In June 2015, Bonevacia was named to the national squad for a friendly against Trinidad and Tobago and 2018 World Cup qualifiers against Cuba. However, Bonevacia did not appear in any of the three matches, and only joined for an unofficial friendly against Suriname in Almere. He was named to the Curaçao preliminary squad for the 2019 CONCACAF Gold Cup in May 2019. On 5 June 2019, he made his official debut for the team against India. He scored on his debut in a 3–1 victory.

== Career statistics ==
=== Club ===
Appearances and goals by club, season and competition
Club	Season	League			Cup		Other		Total	
Club	Season	Division	Apps	Goals	Apps	Goals	Apps	Goals	Apps	Goals
Ajax	2010–11	Eredivisie	1	0	1	0	0	0	2	0
NAC Breda	2011–12	Eredivisie	18	0	1	0	0	0	19	0
Roda JC	2012–13	Eredivisie	16	1	0	0	4	0	20	1
Roda JC	2013–14	Eredivisie	23	0	3	0	0	0	26	0
Roda JC	Total		39	1	3	0	4	0	46	1
Wellington Phoenix	2014–15	A-League	28	4	0	0	0	0	28	4
Wellington Phoenix	2015–16	A-League	26	6	2	0	0	0	28	6
Wellington Phoenix	2016–17	A-League	26	4	1	0	0	0	27	4
Wellington Phoenix	Total		80	14	3	0	0	0	83	14
Western Sydney Wanderers	2017–18	A-League	22	1	2	0	0	0	24	1
Western Sydney Wanderers	2018-19	A-League	23	7	4	2	0	0	27	9
Western Sydney Wanderers	Total		45	8	6	2	0	0	51	10
Al Faisaly	2019-20	Saudi Pro League	21	2	2	1	0	0	23	3
Al-Fujairah SC	2020-21	UAE Pro League	11	1	4	0	0	0	15	1
Melbourne Victory	2023-24	A League Men	11	1	0	0	0	0	11	1
Career total			226	27	20	3	4	0	250	30

=== International ===
As of match played 5 June 2019
Scores and results list Curaçao goal tally first, score column indicates score after each Bonevacia goal.

List of international goals scored by Roly Bonevacia
No.	Date	Venue	Cap	Opponent	Score	Result	Competition
1	5 June 2019	Chang Arena, Buriram, Thailand	1	India	1–0	3–1	2019 King's Cup

== Honours ==
Ajax

- Eredivisie: 2010–11

Curaçao

- King's Cup: 2019

Individual

- PFA A-League Team of the Season: 2015–16

== See also ==
- List of foreign A-League players
- List of Wellington Phoenix FC players
