= Hassan Al-Heji =

Saudi Arabian footballer

Personal information
- Full name: Hassan Abdullah Al-Heji
- Date of birth: July 10, 1987 (age 39)
- Place of birth: Saudi Arabia
- Height: 1.68 m (5 ft 6 in)
- Position: Midfielder

Senior career*
Years	Team	Apps	(Gls)
2010–2015	Al-Fateh	1	(0)
2013–2014	→ Al-Khaleej (loan)		
2015	→ Al-Riyadh (loan)		
2015–2016	Al-Hazem		
2016–2019	Al-Tai	46	(1)
2019–2020	Al-Ain	6	(0)
2020–2021	Al-Nahda	11	(0)
- * Club domestic league appearances and goals

Hassan Al-Heji (Arabic: حسن الحجي; born July 10, 1987) is a retired Saudi football player who played as a midfielder. He is currently working as a coach at Al-Ittihad's youth teams.

== Career ==
Al-Heji began his career at Al-Fateh, before joining Al-Khaleej on loan in 2013 and Al-Riyadh in 2015.

On 9 July 2015, Al-Heji joined Al-Hazem on a one-year contract. He then joined Al-Tai in 2016 spending three years at the club before joining Al-Ain in 2019. On 6 October 2020, Al-Heji joined Al-Nahda where he retired at the end of the season.
