= Moshari Al-Thamali =

Saudi Arabian footballer

Personal information
- Full name: Moshari Mahmoud Al-Thamali
- Date of birth: February 10, 1992 (age 34)
- Place of birth: Ta'if, Saudi Arabia
- Height: 1.77 m (5 ft 10 in)
- Position: Midfielder

Youth career
- ???–2012: Wej
- 2012–2013: Al-Faisaly

Senior career*
Years	Team	Apps	(Gls)
2013–2015	Al-Faisaly	35	(3)
2015–2018	Al-Shabab	11	(0)
2019–2020	Al-Faisaly	1	(0)
2020–2021	Al-Tai		
- * Club domestic league appearances and goals

Moshari Al-Thamali (Arabic: مشاري الثمالي, born 10 February 1992) is a Saudi Arabian football player who plays as a midfielder.
