= Omar Abdulaziz (footballer) =

Saudi Arabian footballer

Personal information
- Full name: Omar Abdulaziz Abdulwadood Omar
- Date of birth: December 17, 1983 (age 42)
- Place of birth: Saudi Arabia
- Height: 1.69 m (5 ft 7 in)
- Position: Midfielder

Senior career*
Years	Team	Apps	(Gls)
2005–2019	Al-Faisaly		
2019–2025	Al-Kawkab		
- * Club domestic league appearances and goals

Omar Abdulaziz (Arabic: عمر عبد العزيز; born 17 December 1983) is a Saudi footballer currently playing as a midfielder.
