= Badr Bashir =

Saudi Arabian footballer

Badr Bashir بدر بشير
Personal information
- Full name: Badr Bashir Abdullah Abu Bakr
- Date of birth: 15 August 1997 (age 29)
- Place of birth: Saudi Arabia
- Position: Midfielder

Team information
- Current team: Al-Khaldiya SC
- Number: 70

Youth career
- Al-Faisaly

Senior career*
Years	Team	Apps	(Gls)
2018–2021	Al-Faisaly	4	(0)
2019–2020	→ Al-Qadsiah (loan)	10	(0)
2020–2021	→ Hajer (loan)	33	(2)
2022–2023	Sitra		
2023	Al-Hidd		
2024–	Al-Khaldiya SC		
- * Club domestic league appearances and goals as of 20 September 2020

Badr Bashir (Arabic: بدر بشير; born 15 August 1997) is a footballer born in Saudi Arabia who plays for Al-Khaldiya SC as a midfielder.

== Career ==
Badr Bashir started his career at Al-Faisaly and is a product of the Al-Faisaly's youth team. On 9 February 2018, Badr Bashir signed a 5-year professional contract with Al-Faisaly. On 23 February 2019, he made his professional debut for Al-Faisaly against Al-Qadsiah in the Pro League, replacing Rogerio. On 25 July 2019, he left Al-Faisaly and joined Al-Qadsiah on loan for the 2019–20 season. On 23 September 2020, Bashir joined Hajer on loan.
