= Lamine Traoré (footballer, born 1993) =

Malian footballer

Personal information
- Date of birth: 21 September 1993 (age 33)
- Place of birth: Bamako, Mali
- Height: 1.84 m (6 ft 1/2 in)
- Position: Striker

Senior career*
Years	Team	Apps	(Gls)
2012–2016	Onze Créateurs		
2016–2017	Stade Gabèsien	4	(0)
2017–2018	CO Médenine	17	(2)
2018–2019	Olympique de Médéa		
2019–2020	Wej		
2020–2022	Aspropyrgos		
2022–2023	Real Bamako		
2023–2024	Coton Sport		
Total		30+	(2+)

International career
2015–2016	Mali	5	(0)
- * Club domestic league appearances and goals

Lamine Traoré (born 21 September 1993) is a Malian former footballer who played as a striker.

== Career ==
Born in Bamako, Traoré played at club level for Onze Créateurs, Stade Gabèsien, CO Médenine, Olympique de Médéa, Wej, Aspropyrgos, Real Bamako and Coton Sport.

He made his international debut for Mali in 2015.
