= Mohammed Al-Motawaa =

Saudi Arabian footballer

Personal information
- Full name: Mohammed Abdulraouf Al-Motawaa
- Date of birth: 6 October 1994 (age 32)
- Place of birth: Qatif, Saudi Arabia
- Position: Forward

Youth career
- Al-Khaleej

Senior career*
Years	Team	Apps	(Gls)
2014–2019	Al-Khaleej		
2019–2021	Ohod		
2021–2022	Al-Nairyah		
2023–2024	Jerash		
- * Club domestic league appearances and goals

Mohammed Al-Motawaa (Arabic: محمد المطوع; born 6 October 1994) is a footballer who plays as a forward.
