= Mohammed Qassem (footballer, born 1995) =

Saudi Arabian footballer

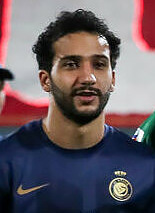
- Qassem with Al Nassr in 2023

Personal information
- Full name: Mohammed Qassem Hamza Al-Nakhli
- Date of birth: 19 January 1995 (age 31)
- Place of birth: Saudi Arabia
- Height: 1.76 m (5 ft 9 in)
- Position: Left-back

Team information
- Current team: Al-Qadsiah
- Number: 24

Youth career
- Al-Ittihad

Senior career*
Years	Team	Apps	(Gls)
2013–2019	Al-Ittihad	75	(1)
2019	→ Al-Fayha (loan)	4	(0)
2019–2021	Al-Faisaly	56	(1)
2021–2024	Al-Nassr	15	(0)
2024–	Al-Qadsiah	24	(0)

International career^{‡}
2016	Saudi Arabia U-23	2	(0)
2017–	Saudi Arabia	1	(0)
- * Club domestic league appearances and goals as of 30 October 2026 ‡ National team caps and goals as of 02:27, 28 January 2016 (UTC)

Mohammed Qassem Al-Nakhli (Arabic: محمد قاسم النخلي; born 19 January 1995), known as Mohammed Qassem, is a Saudi Arabian professional footballer who plays as a left-back for Saudi Pro League club Al-Qadsiah and the Saudi Arabia national team.

== Club career ==
On 8 July 2024, Qassem joined Al-Qadsiah on a free transfer.

== Honours ==
Al Ittihad

- King Cup: 2013, 2018
- Crown Prince Cup: 2016–17

Al-Faisaly

- King Cup: 2020–21

Al Nassr

- Arab Club Champions Cup: 2023
