= Youssef El Jebli =

Dutch footballer (born 1992)

Personal information
- Date of birth: 27 December 1992 (age 33)
- Place of birth: Utrecht, Netherlands
- Height: 1.77 m (5 ft 10 in)
- Position: Midfielder

Youth career
- USV Hercules

Senior career*
Years	Team	Apps	(Gls)
2013–2014	USV Hercules		
2014–2015	Lienden	32	(15)
2015–2019	De Graafschap	129	(25)
2019–2020	Al-Faisaly	29	(9)
2020–2022	Al-Batin	50	(9)
2023	Ohod	19	(4)
2023–2024	Al Hamriyah	15	(6)
2024	Hajer	16	(1)
2024–2025	De Graafschap	15	(0)
- * Club domestic league appearances and goals as of 11 May 2025

Youssef El Jebli (born 27 December 1992) is a Dutch professional footballer who plays as a midfielder. He has played club football in the Netherlands, Saudi Arabia and the United Arab Emirates.

== Career ==
El Jebli was born in Utrecht, Netherlands, into a Moroccan family as one of five children. He grew up in the Overvecht district and began playing football at age six with local amateur side VV De Dreef. After four years, he joined Elinkwijk, a well-known amateur club in Utrecht, and later moved to USV Hercules. He progressed through the youth ranks and made his senior debut for Hercules in 2010, remaining at the club for three seasons.

In 2014, El Jebli joined Lienden in the Derde Divisie, then the third tier of Dutch football. He helped the club win the division title and the overall amateur championship. His performances earned him a move to De Graafschap ahead of the 2015–16 season.

El Jebli made his Eredivisie debut for De Graafschap on 11 August 2015, coming on as a substitute in a match against Heerenveen. He made 31 league appearances in his first season, as De Graafschap were relegated to the Eerste Divisie. In the following seasons, he became a key player in midfield. El Jebli recorded four goals in 2016–17 and registered nine goals and 14 assists in 2017–18, contributing to the club's promotion back to the Eredivisie via the play-offs. In May 2018, he signed a new two-year contract with the club.

On 23 August 2019, El Jebli joined Al-Faisaly in the Saudi Professional League, signing a two-year deal. After spells in Saudi Arabia and the UAE with Ohod (2023), Al-Hamriyah (2023), and Hajer (2024), El Jebli returned to De Graafschap on 24 September 2024, signing a one-year contract.

== Personal life ==
Born in the Netherlands, El Jebli is of Moroccan descent.
