= Khaleem Hyland =

Trinidadian footballer (born 1989)

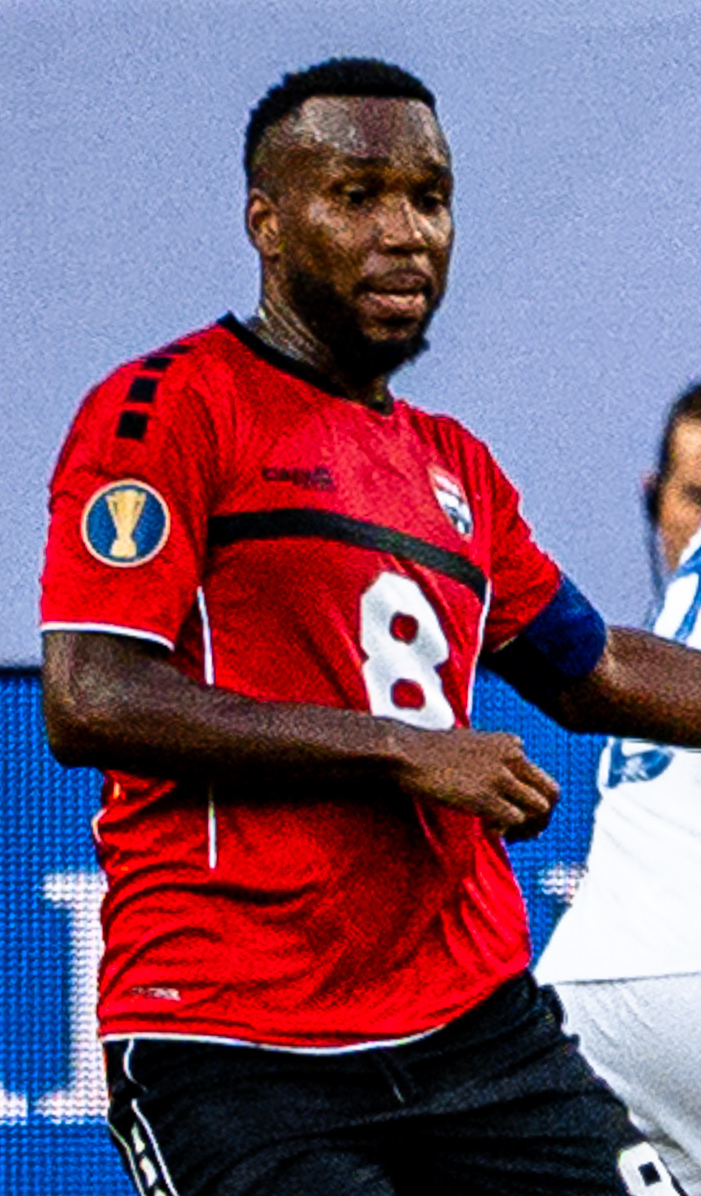
- Hyland with Trinidad and Tobago at the 2019 CONCACAF Gold Cup

Personal information
- Full name: Khaleem Hyland
- Date of birth: 5 June 1989 (age 37)
- Place of birth: Carenage, Trinidad and Tobago
- Height: 1.86 m (6 ft 1 in)
- Position: Defensive midfielder

Team information
- Current team: Al-Batin
- Number: 88

Senior career*
Years	Team	Apps	(Gls)
2007–2008	San Juan Jabloteh		
2008–2009	Portsmouth	0	(0)
2008–2009	→ Zulte Waregem (loan)	13	(0)
2009–2011	Zulte Waregem	59	(5)
2011–2015	Genk	86	(5)
2015–2017	Westerlo	57	(2)
2017–2020	Al-Faisaly	77	(4)
2020–	Al-Batin	0	(0)

International career^{‡}
- Trinidad and Tobago U17
- Trinidad and Tobago U20
2008–	Trinidad and Tobago	94	(5)
- * Club domestic league appearances and goals as of 20:52, 14 September 2020 (UTC) ‡ National team caps and goals as of 23:36, 6 July 2021 (UTC)

Khaleem Hyland (born 5 June 1989) is a Trinidadian professional footballer who plays as a defensive midfielder for Al-Batin and the Trinidad and Tobago national team.

== Club career ==
=== Early career ===
Born in Carenage, Hyland began his career in 2007 with San Juan Jabloteh. In May 2007 it was announced that English side Portsmouth were close to agreeing a deal for the player. In August 2007, Hyland went on trial with Scottish side Celtic, but a £450,000 bid from the club was turned down. After he left San Juan Jabloteh in May 2008, Portsmouth were once again linked with signing Hyland. However, the club's initial application for a work permit was rejected by the Home Office. In September 2008 Portsmouth announced that they were still interested in signing Hyland. Hyland had to wait for a work permit to join Portsmouth, and it was announced that he would move to the club's Belgian feeder club, Zulte Waregem.

=== Zulte Waregem ===
Hyland's loan move to Zulte Waregem was made official on Transfer deadline day, which is 2 February 2009, but his future at Zulte-Waregem became unsure when both clubs decided to stop their partnership in June 2009. A week later it was announced that Hyland was now signed on a permanent basis.

=== Genk ===
He signed permanently for Genk on 9 August 2011, on a five-year-contract. On 9 May 2013, he assisted Bennard Kumordzi's goal to help his club win the 2013 Belgian Cup Final 2–0 against Cercle Brugge.

=== Westerlo ===
On 12 June 2015, it was announced that Westerlo had signed the player on a one-year contract.

=== Saudi Arabia ===
Hyland moved to the Middle East and signed with Saudi club Al Faisaly in June 2017. He scored his first goal on 14 October 2017.

In September 2020 he signed for Al-Batin.

== International career ==
Hyland played for the national under-20s at the 2009 FIFA U-20 World Cup.

Hyland made his full international debut for Trinidad and Tobago on 26 January 2008 against Puerto Rico, and he scored his first international goal on 7 June 2008 against Jamaica in a friendly match at the Marvin Lee Stadium.

== Career statistics ==
Scores and results list Trinidad and Tobago's goal tally first.

No.	Date	Venue	Opponent	Score	Result	Competition
1.	7 June 2008	Marvin Lee Stadium, Macoya, Trinidad and Tobago	Jamaica	1–0	1–1	Friendly
2.	7 November 2008	Marvin Lee Stadium, Macoya, Trinidad and Tobago	Saint Kitts and Nevis	2–0	3–1	2008 Caribbean Cup
3.	28 March 2009	Hasley Crawford Stadium, Port of Spain, Trinidad and Tobago	Honduras	1–1	1–1	2010 FIFA World Cup qualification
4.	14 November 2015	Estadio Mateo Flores, Guatemala City, Guatemala	Guatemala	1–0	2–1	2018 FIFA World Cup qualification
5.	8 June 2021	Félix Sánchez Olympic Stadium, Santo Domingo, Dominican Republic	Saint Kitts and Nevis	2–0	2–0	2022 FIFA World Cup qualification
Correct as of 8 June 2021

== Honours ==
Genk

- Belgian Cup: 2012–13
