= Awadh Khrees =

Saudi Arabian footballer

Personal information
- Full name: Awadh Khrees Al-Sqoor
- Date of birth: January 5, 1991 (age 35)
- Place of birth: Najran, Saudi Arabia
- Height: 1.78 m (5 ft 10 in)
- Position: Right back

Youth career
- Najran

Senior career*
Years	Team	Apps	(Gls)
2010–2015	Najran	68	(3)
2015–2018	Al-Ittihad	35	(1)
2018–2021	Al-Faisaly	9	(0)
2020	→ Al-Adalah (loan)	9	(0)
2021–2022	Al-Adalah	25	(0)
2022–2023	Al-Riyadh	2	(0)
2023	Al-Jabalain	12	(0)
2023–2024	Al-Adalah		
- * Club domestic league appearances and goals

Awadh Khrees (Arabic: عوض خريص; born 5 January 1991) is a Saudi Arabian professional footballer who plays as a right back.

== Honours ==
Al-Ittihad

- Crown Prince Cup: 2016–17
- King Cup: 2018

Al-Faisaly

- King Cup: 2020–21
