= 2019–20 Al-Shabab FC season =

Al-Shabab
2019–20 season
- President: Khaled Al-Baltan
- Manager: Jorge Almirón (until 4 December); Luis García (from 12 December until 18 July); Pedro Caixinha (from 20 July)
- Stadium: Prince Faisal bin Fahd Stadium; King Fahd International Stadium
- SPL: 7th
- King Cup: Round of 16 (knocked out by Al-Shoulla)
- Arab Club Champions Cup: Semi-finals
- Top goalscorer: League: Cristian Guanca (11); All: Cristian Guanca (15)
- Highest home attendance: 12,719 vs Al-Nassr (14 February 2020)
- Lowest home attendance: 1,160 vs Al-Raed (12 December 2019)
- Average home league attendance: 7,740
- All statistics correct as of 9 September 2020.

The 2019–20 season was Al-Shabab's 43rd non-consecutive season in the top flight of Saudi football and 73rd year in existence as a football club. This season Al-Shabab participated in the Pro League, the King Cup, and the Arab Club Champions Cup.

The season covers the period from 1 July 2019 to 20 September 2020.

== Players ==
=== Squad information ===
As of 1 February 2020

Note: Flags indicate national team as defined under FIFA eligibility rules; some limited exceptions apply. Players may hold more than one non-FIFA nationality.

No.	Pos.	Nation	Player
1	GK	TUN	Farouk Ben Mustapha
5	DF	ALG	Djamel Benlamri
6	MF	KSA	Abdulmalek Al-Khaibri
7	MF	KSA	Turki Al-Ammar
8	MF	KSA	Abdulmajeed Al-Sulayhem
9	FW	KSA	Abdullah Al-Hamdan
10	MF	ARG	Cristian Guanca
11	MF	KSA	Abdulmalek Al-Shammeri
12	DF	KSA	Mohammed Salem
13	DF	KSA	Hassan Muath
14	DF	KSA	Abdullah Al-Zori
16	MF	KSA	Mohammed Attiyah
17	DF	KSA	Abdullah Al-Shamekh
18	MF	KSA	Waleed Al-Enezi
20	DF	KSA	Ahmed Sharahili
21	MF	KSA	Nasser Al-Omran

No.	Pos.	Nation	Player
23	GK	KSA	Marwan Al-Haidari
24	DF	KSA	Moteb Al-Harbi
26	MF	KSA	Dhaidan Al-Mutairi
30	GK	KSA	Abdullah Al-Owaishir (on loan from Al-Nassr)
32	DF	KSA	Muteb Al-Mufarrij (on loan from Al-Hilal)
38	DF	KSA	Nawaf Al-Duraiwish
43	MF	KSA	Marzouq Al-Dossari
45	DF	KSA	Mohammed Al-Khaibari
46	FW	KSA	Fares Al-Owais
48	MF	KSA	Nawaf Al-Shahrani
50	GK	KSA	Mohammed Al-Dawsari
70	MF	COL	Danilo Asprilla
81	MF	SEN	Alfred N'Diaye
90	FW	SEN	Makhete Diop
92	MF	BRA	Sebá
99	FW	KSA	Hassan Al-Raheb

==== Out on loan ====
Note: Flags indicate national team as defined under FIFA eligibility rules; some limited exceptions apply. Players may hold more than one non-FIFA nationality.

No.	Pos.	Nation	Player
2	DF	KSA	Mohammed Al-Baqawi (at Al-Fayha until 20 September 2020)
4	DF	KSA	Hassan Tombakti (at Al-Wehda until 20 September 2020)
19	MF	KSA	Nawaf Al-Habashi (at Al-Qadsiah until 20 September 2020)
22	GK	KSA	Mohammed Awaji (at Al-Adalah until 20 September 2020)

No.	Pos.	Nation	Player
28	MF	KSA	Hassan Al-Qayd (at Abha until 20 September 2020)
29	FW	GAM	Bubacarr Trawally (at Ajman until 20 September 2020)
35	MF	KSA	Abdullah Haqawi (at Al-Kawkab until 20 September 2020)
—	FW	BRA	Arthur Caíke (at Bahia until 20 September 2020)

== Transfers and loans ==
=== Transfers in ===
Entry date	Position	No.	Player	From club	Fee	Ref.
30 June 2019	DF	31	(Saudi Arabia) Muaid Moaafa	(Saudi Arabia) Al-Kawkab	End of loan	
30 June 2019	DF	35	(Saudi Arabia) Hassan Raghfawi	(Saudi Arabia) Damac	End of loan	
30 June 2019	DF	–	(Saudi Arabia) Faisal Hadadi	(Saudi Arabia) Al-Washm	End of loan	
30 June 2019	MF	28	(Saudi Arabia) Hassan Al-Qayd	(Saudi Arabia) Al-Khaleej	End of loan	
1 July 2019	DF	17	(Saudi Arabia) Abdullah Al-Shamekh	(Saudi Arabia) Al-Raed	Free	
1 July 2019	MF	16	(Saudi Arabia) Mohammed Attiyah	(Saudi Arabia) Ohod	Free	
1 July 2019	MF	70	(Colombia) Danilo Asprilla	(United Arab Emirates) Al Ain	Free	
2 July 2019	GK	23	(Saudi Arabia) Marwan Al-Haidari	(Saudi Arabia) Al-Hilal	Free	
3 July 2019	MF	10	(Argentina) Cristian Guanca	(Argentina) Colón	$1,000,000	
5 July 2019	MF	6	(Saudi Arabia) Abdulmalek Al-Khaibri	(Saudi Arabia) Al-Hilal	Free	
8 July 2019	DF	20	(Saudi Arabia) Ahmed Sharahili	(Saudi Arabia) Al-Hilal	Free	
20 July 2019	DF	37	(Nigeria) Imran Ilyas	(Saudi Arabia) Najran	Free	
2 August 2019	FW	15	(Saudi Arabia) Mohammad Al-Sahlawi	(Saudi Arabia) Al-Nassr	Free	
30 August 2019	MF	81	(Senegal) Alfred N'Diaye	(Spain) Villarreal	$6,000,000	
2 January 2020	FW	90	(Senegal) Makhete Diop	(China) Beijing Renhe	Free	
30 January 2020	DF	3	(Saudi Arabia) Abdullah Al-Zori	(Saudi Arabia) Al-Wehda	$533,000	

=== Loans in ===
Start date	End date	Position	No.	Player	From club	Fee	Ref.
11 July 2019	31 August 2019	MF	–	(Saudi Arabia) Rakan Al-Shamlan	(Saudi Arabia) Al-Nassr	None	
13 July 2019	End of season	GK	30	(Saudi Arabia) Abdullah Al-Owaishir	(Saudi Arabia) Al-Nassr	None	
31 August 2019	End of season	DF	32	(Saudi Arabia) Muteb Al-Mufarrij	(Saudi Arabia) Al-Hilal	None	

=== Transfers out ===
Exit date	Position	No.	Player	To club	Fee	Ref.
1 July 2019	DF	25	(Romania) Valerică Găman		Released	
7 July 2019	MF	88	(Brazil) Luiz Antônio	(United Arab Emirates) Baniyas	Free	
11 July 2019	MF	77	(Saudi Arabia) Khalid Kaabi	(Saudi Arabia) Al-Faisaly	Free	
14 July 2019	MF	55	(Saudi Arabia) Moshari Al-Thamali	(Saudi Arabia) Al-Faisaly	Free	
17 July 2019	GK	50	(Saudi Arabia) Abdullah Al-Sudairy	(Saudi Arabia) Al-Taqadom	Free	
23 July 2019	DF	2	(Saudi Arabia) Abdulmajeed Arishi	(Saudi Arabia) Ohod	Free	
6 August 2019	DF	31	(Saudi Arabia) Muaid Moaafa		Released	
8 August 2019	MF	–	(Saudi Arabia) Ghallab Al-Enezi	(Saudi Arabia) Al-Hazem	Free	
20 August 2019	MF	34	(Morocco) Mbark Boussoufa	(Qatar) Al-Sailiya	Free	
28 August 2019	MF	10	(Romania) Constantin Budescu	(Romania) Astra Giurgiu	Free	
3 September 2019	DF	–	(Saudi Arabia) Faisal Hadadi	(Saudi Arabia) Al-Diriyah	Free	
11 January 2020	DF	37	(Nigeria) Imran Ilyas	(Saudi Arabia) Damac	Free	
22 January 2020	FW	15	(Saudi Arabia) Mohammad Al-Sahlawi	(Saudi Arabia) Al-Taawoun	Free	
31 January 2020	DF	3	(Saudi Arabia) Fahad Ghazi	(Saudi Arabia) Al-Ettifaq	Free	

=== Loans out ===
Start date	End date	Position	No.	Player	To club	Fee	Ref.
10 July 2019	End of season	DF	35	(Saudi Arabia) Hassan Raghfawi	(Saudi Arabia) Damac	None	
14 July 2019	End of season	MF	19	(Saudi Arabia) Nawaf Al-Habashi	(Saudi Arabia) Al-Qadsiah	None	
15 August 2019	End of season	MF	–	(Saudi Arabia) Abdullah Haqawi	(Saudi Arabia) Al-Kawkab	None	
31 August 2019	End of season	DF	4	(Saudi Arabia) Hassan Tambakti	(Saudi Arabia) Al-Wehda	None	
30 September 2019	End of season	FW	29	(The Gambia) Bubacarr Trawally	(United Arab Emirates) Ajman	None	
28 January 2020	End of season	DF	2	(Saudi Arabia) Mohammed Al-Baqawi	(Saudi Arabia) Al-Fayha	None	
28 January 2020	End of season	MF	28	(Saudi Arabia) Hassan Al-Qayd	(Saudi Arabia) Abha	None	
29 January 2020	End of season	GK	22	(Saudi Arabia) Mohammed Awaji	(Saudi Arabia) Al-Adalah	None	

== Competitions ==
=== Overview ===
Competition	Record							
Competition	G	W	D	L	GF	GA	GD	Win %
Pro League	30	12	7	11	38	37	+1	40.00
King Cup	2	1	0	1	7	2	+5	50.00
Arab Club Champions Cup	6	5	1	0	14	2	+12	83.33
Total	38	18	8	12	59	41	+18	47.37

Updated to match played 9 September 2020
Source: Competitions

=== Pro League ===
==== League table ====
Pos	Team	Pld	W	D	L	GF	GA	GD	Pts
5	Al-Faisaly	30	14	6	10	41	36	+5	48
6	Al-Raed	30	13	7	10	41	50	−9	46
7	Al-Shabab	30	12	7	11	38	37	+1	43
8	Al-Ettifaq	30	13	3	14	46	38	+8	42
9	Abha	30	11	5	14	41	52	−11	38

Updated to match(es) played on 9 September 2020. Source: spl.com
Rules for classification: 1) Points; 2) Head-to-head points; 3) Head-to-head goal difference; 4) Total goal difference; 5) Total goals scored; 6) Fair-play points (Note: Head-to-head record is used only after all the matches between the teams in question have been played).

==== Results summary ====
Overall								Home						Away					
Pld	W	D	L	GF	GA	GD	Pts	W	D	L	GF	GA	GD	W	D	L	GF	GA	GD
30	12	7	11	38	37	+1	43	8	3	4	23	16	+7	4	4	7	15	21	−6

Last updated: 9 September 2020.

==== Results by round ====
Round	1	2	3	4	5	6	7	8	9	10	11	12	13	14	15	16	17	18	19	20	21	22	23	24	25	26	27	28	29	30
Ground	A	H	A	A	H	A	H	H	A	H	H	A	H	A	H	H	A	H	H	A	H	A	A	H	A	A	H	A	H	A
Result	W	D	D	D	L	W	W	W	L	L	L	L	W	W	D	W	L	L	W	L	W	L	W	W	D	L	D	D	W	L
Position	5	5	6	7	11	7	5	2	5	7	9	10	9	8	9	7	8	8	8	8	7	8	7	6	7	7	8	8	7	7

Updated to match(es) played on 9 September 2020. Source:
A = Away; H = Home; W = Win; D = Draw; L = Loss

==== Matches ====
All times are local, AST (UTC+3).

Win Draw Loss Postponed

24 August 2019 1	Al-Fateh	1–2	Al-Shabab	Al-Hasa
18:50	Al-Zaqaan (yellow card) 45+4'; Buhimed (yellow card) 48'; Saâdane 90+1' (pen.)	Report	Asprilla 1'; Guanca 49' (pen.)	Stadium: Prince Abdullah bin Jalawi Stadium; Attendance: 5,242; Referee: Martin van den Kerkhof (Netherlands)

30 August 2019 2	Al-Shabab	0–0	Al-Faisaly	Riyadh
18:55	Sebá (yellow card) 76'; Salem (yellow card) 90+5'	Report	Malayekah (yellow card) 71'; Ashraf (red card) 85'	Stadium: King Fahd International Stadium; Attendance: 3,976; Referee: Viktor Kassai (Hungary)

13 September 2019 3	Al-Nassr	0–0	Al-Shabab	Riyadh
20:35	Hamdallah (yellow card) 77'	Report	N'Diaye (yellow card) 32'; Salem (yellow card) 60'; Ben Mustapha (yellow card) 77'; Al Omran (yellow card) 79'	Stadium: King Fahd International Stadium; Attendance: 12,224; Referee: Daniel Stefanski (Poland)

19 September 2019 4	Damac	1–1	Al-Shabab	Abha
18:50	Fellipe 27'; Al-Jayzani (yellow card) 33'; Al-Najei (yellow card) 78'	Report	Guanca 40'	Stadium: Prince Sultan bin Abdul Aziz Stadium; Attendance: 9,035; Referee: Serdar Gözübüyük (Netherlands)

27 September 2019 5	Al-Shabab	1–2	Al-Ittihad	Riyadh
18:25	N'Diaye (yellow card) 55'; Al-Sulayhem (yellow card) 60'; Al-Hamdan 80'	Report	Vecchio 21'; Al-Qarni (yellow card) 33'; Abdulhamid (yellow card) 34'; Fallatah (yellow card) 38'; Al-Sahafi (yellow card) 41'; Romarinho 74'	Stadium: King Fahd International Stadium; Attendance: 10,461; Referee: Pawel Raczkowski (Poland)

5 October 2019 6	Al-Adalah	0–1	Al-Shabab	Al-Hasa
18:05	Al-Muwallad (yellow card) 42'; Cissé (yellow card) 82'; Al-Yousef (yellow card) 90+1'	Report	Al-Hamdan (yellow card) 10'; Sebá (yellow card) 45', (goal) 63'; Benlamri (yellow card) 72'	Stadium: Prince Abdullah bin Jalawi Stadium; Attendance: 5,441; Referee: Siemen Mulder (Netherlands)

19 October 2019 7	Al-Shabab	2–1	Al-Ettifaq	Riyadh
18:05	Sebá 26', (yellow card) 41'; Salem (yellow card) 45'; Guanca 74'; Al-Shamekh (yellow card) 75'; Al-Hamdan (yellow card) 90+1'	Report	Hazazi (yellow card) 21'; Yambéré 71'; Al-Ghamdi (yellow card) 90'	Stadium: Prince Khalid bin Sultan Stadium; Attendance: 6,172; Referee: Matej Jug (Slovenia)

24 October 2019 8	Al-Shabab	2–0	Al-Wehda	Riyadh
19:55	Sebá 64'; Al-Hamdan 79'	Report	Renato (yellow card) 19'; Abdu Jaber (yellow card) 37'; Al-Saiari (red card) 73'; Botía (yellow card) 73'; Bakshween (yellow card) 84'; Al-Shamlan (yellow card) 90+2'	Stadium: Prince Khalid bin Sultan Stadium; Attendance: 5,717; Referee: Damir Skomina (Slovenia)

2 November 2019 9	Al-Taawoun	3–1	Al-Shabab	Buraidah
18:00	Héldon 18' (pen.); Al-Swat 70'; Tawamba 80'	Report	Salem (yellow card) 17'; N'Diaye (yellow card) 24'; Asprilla 47'	Stadium: King Abdullah Sport City Stadium; Attendance: 3,566; Referee: Hugo Miguel (Portugal)

22 November 2019 10	Al-Shabab	0–1	Al-Fayha	Riyadh
19:40	Ilyas (yellow card) 55'	Report	Owusu 60'	Stadium: Prince Faisal bin Fahd Stadium; Attendance: 10,118; Referee: Kevin Blom (Netherlands)

12 December 2019 11	Al-Shabab	3–4	Al-Raed	Riyadh
17:45	Salem 44'; N'Diaye (yellow card) 61'; Guanca 67'; Asprilla 90+4'	Report	Al-Ghamdi 23', 51'; Al-Amri 33'; Daoudi 86'	Stadium: Prince Faisal bin Fahd Stadium; Attendance: 1,160; Referee: Mattias Gestranius (Finland)

19 December 2019 12	Abha	2–0	Al-Shabab	Abha
15:40	Barnawi (yellow card) 15'; Bguir 45+1', (yellow card) 45+4'; Andriatsima (yellow card) 62', (goal) 90+5'; Aouadhi (yellow card) 78'	Report	Sebá (yellow card) 17' (yellow-red card) 69'; Asprilla (yellow card) 39'; Al-Ammar (yellow card) 56'; Al-Khaibri (red card) 57'	Stadium: Prince Sultan bin Abdul Aziz Stadium; Attendance: 1,218; Referee: Pavel Královec (Czech Republic)

28 December 2019 13	Al-Shabab	1–0	Al-Ahli	Riyadh
17:50	Asprilla 27'; Sharahili (yellow card) 28'; N'Diaye (yellow card) 60'	Report	Al-Mowalad (yellow card) 74'; Souza (yellow card) 87'; Al-Asmari (yellow card) 89'	Stadium: Prince Faisal bin Fahd Stadium; Attendance: 11,746; Referee: Ovidiu Hațegan (Romania)

10 January 2020 14	Al-Hazem	0–1	Al-Shabab	Ar Rass
15:35	Al-Khalaf (yellow card) 90+1'	Report	N'Diaye (yellow card) 17'; Diop 56'; Al-Shamekh (yellow card) 79'	Stadium: Al-Hazem Club Stadium; Attendance: 3,125; Referee: Szymon Marciniak (Poland)

25 January 2020 15	Al-Shabab	0–0	Al-Hilal	Riyadh
18:10	N'Diaye (yellow card) 50'; Al-Shamekh (yellow card) 89'; Al-Ammar (yellow card) 90+5'	Report	Al-Bulaihi (yellow card) 9' (yellow-red card) 82'; Kurdi (yellow card) 39'	Stadium: Prince Faisal bin Fahd Stadium; Attendance: 12,531; Referee: Svein Oddvar Moen (Norway)

1 February 2020 16	Al-Shabab	2–1	Al-Fateh	Riyadh
18:15	Diop 48'; Guanca 51'; Sebá (yellow card) 88'	Report	Saâdane 35'; Kanabah (yellow card) 39'; Naji (yellow card) 54'; Majrashi (yellow card) 76'	Stadium: Prince Faisal bin Fahd Stadium; Attendance: 8,911; Referee: Turki Al-Khudhayr

7 February 2020 17	Al-Faisaly	2–1	Al-Shabab	Al Majma'ah
20:20	Malayekah (yellow card) 45'; Rossi (yellow card) 45+4', (goal) 57'; Silva (yellow card) 72'; Hyland (yellow card) 78'; El Jebli 89' (pen.)	Report	Al-Sulayhem 44'; Al-Shamekh (yellow card) 52'; Al Omran (yellow card) 75'	Stadium: Al Majma'ah Sports City; Attendance: 4,434; Referee: Dennis Higler (Netherlands)

14 February 2020 18	Al-Shabab	2–4	Al-Nassr	Riyadh
18:25	Diop (yellow card) 30' (yellow-red card) 90+1'; Asprilla 36', (yellow card) 84'; N'Diaye (yellow card) 56'; Guanca 59'; Al-Sulayhem (yellow card) 64'; Ben Mustapha (yellow card) 86'; Salem (yellow card) 90'	Report	Hamdallah 14', 82', 90+2' (pen.), (yellow card) 90+3'; S. Al-Ghanam (yellow card) 62'; Amrabat (yellow card) 88'; K. Al-Ghannam 90+4'	Stadium: Prince Faisal bin Fahd Stadium; Attendance: 12,719; Referee: Ovidiu Hațegan (Romania)

20 February 2020 19	Al-Shabab	3–2	Damac	Riyadh
18:30	Sebá 17' (pen.); Salem (yellow card) 22'; Al-Shamekh (red card) 45+2'; Sharahili (yellow card) 49'; Al-Zori 76'; Guanca 88'	Report	Saidani (yellow card) 25'; Costa 45+6'; Zelaya 56'; Chafaï (yellow card) 90+3'	Stadium: Prince Khalid Bin Sultan Stadium; Attendance: 5,217; Referee: Matthew Conger (New Zealand)

29 February 2020 20	Al-Ittihad	5–1	Al-Shabab	Jeddah
20:40	Bony 16', (yellow card) 38'; Romarinho (yellow card) 19', (goal) 77', 80'; Al-Shamrani 20', 72'	Report	Diop 10'; N'Diaye (yellow card) 41' (yellow-red card) 74'; Sharahili (yellow card) 70'; Ben Mustapha (yellow card) 71'; Guanca (yellow card) 86'	Stadium: King Abdullah Sports City; Attendance: 23,746; Referee: Björn Kuipers (Netherlands)

5 March 2020 21	Al-Shabab	4–0	Al-Adalah	Riyadh
20:40	Guanca 39'; Al-Sulayhem 45+4'; Al-Hamdan 72'; Al-Ammar 87', (yellow card) 89'	Report	Ogu (red card) 23'; Gentsoglou (yellow card) 63'; Al-Yousef (yellow card) 64'; Al-Sultan (yellow card) 65'	Stadium: Prince Faisal bin Fahd Stadium; Attendance: 4,144; Referee: Majed Al-Shamrani

11 March 2020 22	Al-Ettifaq	1–0	Al-Shabab	Dammam
18:25	Kiss 66' (pen.); Al Khairi (yellow card) 79'; Al-Torais (yellow card) 90+3'	Report	Al-Khaibri (yellow card) 26'; Salem (yellow card) 64'; Al-Zori (yellow card) 89'	Stadium: Prince Mohamed bin Fahd Stadium; Attendance: 0 (Note: Matches from 7 March and onwards will be played behind closed doors due to concerns over the coronavirus pandemic.); Referee: Mattias Gestranius (Finland)

5 August 2020 23	Al-Wehda	0–3	Al-Shabab	Mecca
19:30	Al-Sqoor (yellow card) 44'; Madkhali (yellow card) 46'; Anselmo (yellow card) 52'; Tambakti (yellow card) 62'; Renato (yellow card) 72' (yellow-red card) 76'; Bakshween (yellow card) 87'; Al-Sawadi (yellow card) 90'	Report	Sebá 34' (pen.); Diop 45' (pen.), 67'; Al-Sulayhem (yellow card) 56'; N'Diaye (red card) 86'	Stadium: King Abdul Aziz Stadium; Attendance: 0 Referee: Mohammed Al-Hoaish

10 August 2020 24	Al-Shabab	1–0	Al-Taawoun	Riyadh
19:05	Al-Shamekh (yellow card) 6'; Al-Sulayhem (yellow card) 34', (goal) 67'; Salem (yellow card) 81'; Al-Zori (yellow card) 90+7'	Report	Petrolina (yellow card) 20'; Amissi (yellow card) 27'; Manoel (yellow card) 89'; Assiri (yellow card) 90+8'	Stadium: Prince Faisal bin Fahd Stadium; Attendance: 0 Referee: Tamás Bognár (Hungary)

14 August 2020 25	Al-Fayha	1–1	Al-Shabab	Al Majma'ah
19:10	Andriatsima (yellow card) 20'; Owusu 33'; Al-Barakah (yellow card) 54'	Report	Asprilla 57'; Al-Omran (yellow card) 90'	Stadium: Al Majma'ah Sports City; Attendance: 0 Referee: Nikola Dabanović (Montenegro)

19 August 2020 26	Al-Raed	2–1	Al-Shabab	Buraidah
20:55	Fouzair (yellow card) 47'; Daoudi 69'; Al-Hussain 80'	Report	Diop 17'; Sharahili (yellow card) 67'; Sebá (yellow card) 90+3'	Stadium: King Abdullah Sport City Stadium; Attendance: 0 Referee: Andris Treimanis (Latvia)

24 August 2020 27	Al-Shabab	1–1	Abha	Riyadh
19:00	Asprilla 12'; Salem (yellow card) 39'; Sebá (yellow card) 63'; Al-Khaibri (red card) 90'	Report	Tahrat (yellow card) 6'; Al-Qahtani (yellow card) 56'; Bguir 67' (pen.)	Stadium: Prince Khaled bin Sultan Stadium; Attendance: 0 Referee: Turki Al-Khudhayr

30 August 2020 28	Al-Ahli	1–1	Al-Shabab	Jeddah
20:40	Al-Majhad (yellow card) 24'; Al-Asmari 39'; Sarić (yellow card) 53'; Lucas Lima (yellow card) 55'; H. Asiri (yellow card) 90+9'	Report	Guanca 21'; Al-Hamdan (yellow card) 28'	Stadium: King Abdullah Sports City; Attendance: 0 Referee: Aleksei Kulbakov (Belarus)

4 September 2020 29	Al-Shabab	1–0	Al-Hazem	Riyadh
20:35	Sharahili (yellow card) 21'; Muath (yellow card) 29'; Asprilla (yellow card) 38'; Guanca 46', (yellow card) 65'; Salem (yellow card) 67'; Al-Zori (yellow card) 90+4'	Report	Al-Mousa (yellow card) 25'	Stadium: Prince Faisal bin Fahd Stadium; Attendance: 0 Referee: João Pinheiro (Portugal)

9 September 2020 30	Al-Hilal	2–1	Al-Shabab	Riyadh
20:35	Gomis 20', 69'; Al-Breik (yellow card) 53'	Report	Guanca 46'	Stadium: King Saud University Stadium; Attendance: 0 Referee: Gediminas Mažeika (Lithuania)

=== King Cup ===
All times are local, AST (UTC+3).

13 November 2019 Round of 64	Tabarjal	0–6	Al-Shabab	Sakakah
15:30	Ibrahim (yellow card) 77'	Report	Guanca 16', 72'; Sebá 62'; Sharahili 66'; N'Diaye 80'; Al-Sahlawi 85' (pen.)	Stadium: Al-Jouf University Stadium; Referee: Abdullah Al-Nuhait

4 December 2019 Round of 32	Al-Shoulla	2–1 (a.e.t.)	Al-Shabab	Al-Kharj
17:45	Sami (yellow card) 67'; Seraj (yellow card) 81'; Rawaf 83'; Al-Mutairi (yellow card) 90'; Haqawi (yellow card) 106'; Daouda 120+2'	Report	Sebá (yellow card) 22'; Salem 43'; Ilyas (yellow card) 78'	Stadium: Al-Shoulla Club Stadium; Referee: Sultan Al-Harbi

=== Arab Club Champions Cup ===
==== Round of 32 ====
23 September 2019 First leg	JS Saoura (Algeria)	1–3	(Saudi Arabia) Al-Shabab	Béchar, Algeria
20:00 WAT	Yahia-Chérif 14'	Report	Sebá 62'; Al-Hamdan 66'; Asprilla 68'	Stadium: Stade 20 Août 1955; Referee: Ali Sabah (Iraq)

1 October 2019 Second leg	Al-Shabab (Saudi Arabia)	2–0 (5–1 agg.)	(Algeria) JS Saoura	Riyadh, Saudi Arabia
19:00 AST	Al-Hamdan 71'; Al-Sahlawi 84'	Report		Stadium: Prince Faisal bin Fahd Stadium; Referee: Qasim Al-Hatmi (Oman)

==== Round of 16 ====
28 October 2019 First leg	Al-Shabab (Saudi Arabia)	1–0	(Jordan) Shabab Al-Ordon	Riyadh, Saudi Arabia
19:15 AST	Muath 90'	Report		Stadium: Prince Faisal bin Fahd Stadium; Referee: Ali Al Samahiji (Bahrain)

8 November 2019 Second leg	Shabab Al-Ordon (Jordan)	1–1 (1–2 agg.)	(Saudi Arabia) Al-Shabab	Amman, Jordan
17:30 EET	Gamal 78'	Report	Benlamri 86'	Stadium: King Abdullah II Stadium; Referee: Mehdi Abid Charef (Algeria)

==== Quarter-finals ====
23 December 2019 First leg	Al-Shabab (Saudi Arabia)	6–0	(Iraq) Al-Shorta	Riyadh, Saudi Arabia
19:00 AST	Asprilla 6', 8', 44'; Sebá 19' (pen.), 72'; Guanca 22'	Report		Stadium: Prince Faisal bin Fahd Stadium; Referee: Amin Omar (Egypt)

20 January 2020 Second leg	Al-Shorta (Iraq)	0–1 (0–7 agg.)	(Saudi Arabia) Al-Shabab	Amman, Jordan
16:30 EET		Report	Guanca 89'	Stadium: King Abdullah II Stadium (Note: The second leg fixture between Al-Shorta and Al-Shabab, originally scheduled to be played at the Karbala International Stadium in Karbala, Iraq, was played at King Abdullah II Stadium in Amman, Jordan due to security concerns from the 2019–20 Iraqi protests.); Referee: Ammar Ashkanani (Kuwait)

== Statistics ==
=== Appearances ===
Last updated on 9 September 2020.

No.	Pos	Nat	Player	Total		Pro League		King Cup		Arab Club Champions Cup	
No.	Pos	Nat	Player	Apps	Goals	Apps	Goals	Apps	Goals	Apps	Goals
Goalkeepers
1	GK	(Tunisia) TUN	Farouk Ben Mustapha	25	0	25	0	0	0	0	0
23	GK	(Saudi Arabia) KSA	Marwan Al-Haidari	6	0	5	0	1	0	0	0
30	GK	(Saudi Arabia) KSA	Abdullah Al-Owaishir	8	0	0+1	0	1	0	6	0
Defenders
5	DF	(Algeria) ALG	Djamel Benlamri	13	1	8+1	0	0	0	4	1
12	DF	(Saudi Arabia) KSA	Mohammed Salem	32	2	27	1	1	1	4	0
13	DF	(Saudi Arabia) KSA	Hassan Muath	22	1	19+1	0	0	0	1+1	1
14	DF	(Saudi Arabia) KSA	Abdullah Al-Zori	13	1	9+4	1	0	0	0	0
17	DF	(Saudi Arabia) KSA	Abdullah Al-Shamekh	25	0	19+3	0	0	0	3	0
20	DF	(Saudi Arabia) KSA	Ahmed Sharahili	26	1	22	0	1+1	1	1+1	0
24	DF	(Saudi Arabia) KSA	Moteb Al-Harbi	0	0	0	0	0	0	0	0
32	DF	(Saudi Arabia) KSA	Muteb Al-Mufarrij	9	0	3+1	0	1	0	4	0
38	DF	(Saudi Arabia) KSA	Nawaf Al-Duraiwish	0	0	0	0	0	0	0	0
45	DF	(Saudi Arabia) KSA	Mohammed Al-Khaibari	2	0	0+2	0	0	0	0	0
Midfielders
6	MF	(Saudi Arabia) KSA	Abdulmalek Al-Khaibri	25	0	12+8	0	1	0	1+3	0
7	MF	(Saudi Arabia) KSA	Turki Al-Ammar	20	1	3+13	1	0	0	3+1	0
8	MF	(Saudi Arabia) KSA	Abdulmajeed Al-Sulayhem	33	3	24+2	3	1	0	5+1	0
10	MF	(Argentina) ARG	Cristian Guanca	36	15	29+1	11	2	2	4	2
11	MF	(Saudi Arabia) KSA	Abdulmalek Al-Shammeri	12	0	1+6	0	1+1	0	2+1	0
16	MF	(Saudi Arabia) KSA	Mohammed Attiyah	1	0	0+1	0	0	0	0	0
18	MF	(Saudi Arabia) KSA	Waleed Al-Enezi	3	0	1+2	0	0	0	0	0
21	MF	(Saudi Arabia) KSA	Nasser Al-Omran	19	0	5+9	0	1	0	4	0
26	MF	(Saudi Arabia) KSA	Dhaidan Al-Mutairi	0	0	0	0	0	0	0	0
43	MF	(Saudi Arabia) KSA	Marzouq Al-Dossari	1	0	0+1	0	0	0	0	0
48	MF	(Saudi Arabia) KSA	Nawaf Al-Shahrani	0	0	0	0	0	0	0	0
70	MF	(Colombia) COL	Danilo Asprilla	37	11	28+1	7	2	0	6	4
81	MF	(Senegal) SEN	Alfred N'Diaye	30	1	22	0	2	1	5+1	0
92	MF	(Brazil) BRA	Sebá	32	9	25	5	2	1	5	3
Forwards
9	FW	(Saudi Arabia) KSA	Abdullah Al-Hamdan	22	5	15+4	3	0	0	2+1	2
46	FW	(Saudi Arabia) KSA	Fares Al-Owais	0	0	0	0	0	0	0	0
90	FW	(Senegal) SEN	Makhete Diop	14	6	11+2	6	0	0	1	0
99	FW	(Saudi Arabia) KSA	Hassan Al-Raheb	5	0	0+3	0	0	0	0+2	0
Players sent out on loan this season
2	DF	(Saudi Arabia) KSA	Mohammed Al-Baqawi	14	0	4+3	0	1	0	2+4	0
4	DF	(Saudi Arabia) KSA	Hassan Tambakti	0	0	0	0	0	0	0	0
22	GK	(Saudi Arabia) KSA	Mohammed Awaji	0	0	0	0	0	0	0	0
28	MF	(Saudi Arabia) KSA	Hassan Al-Qayd	2	0	0	0	0+2	0	0	0
29	FW	(The Gambia) GAM	Bubacarr Trawally	0	0	0	0	0	0	0	0
Player who made an appearance this season but have left the club
3	DF	(Saudi Arabia) KSA	Fahad Ghazi	4	0	2	0	0+1	0	1	0
15	FW	(Saudi Arabia) KSA	Mohammad Al-Sahlawi	11	2	1+6	0	1+1	1	0+2	1
33	MF	(Brazil) BRA	Somália	9	0	6	0	1	0	2	0
37	DF	(Nigeria) NGA	Imran Ilyas	10	0	4+4	0	2	0	0	0

=== Goalscorers ===
Rank	No.	Pos	Nat	Name	Pro League	King Cup	Arab Club Champions Cup	Total
1	10	MF	(Argentina)	Cristian Guanca	11	2	2	15
2	70	MF	(Colombia)	Danilo Asprilla	7	0	4	11
3	92	MF	(Brazil)	Sebá	5	1	3	9
4	90	FW	(Senegal)	Makhete Diop	6	0	0	6
5	9	FW	(Saudi Arabia)	Abdullah Al-Hamdan	3	0	2	5
6	8	MF	(Saudi Arabia)	Abdulmajeed Al-Sulayhem	3	0	0	3
7	12	DF	(Saudi Arabia)	Mohammed Salem	1	1	0	2
7	15	FW	(Saudi Arabia)	Mohammad Al-Sahlawi	0	1	1	2
9	5	DF	(Algeria)	Djamel Benlamri	0	0	1	1
9	7	MF	(Saudi Arabia)	Turki Al-Ammar	1	0	0	1
9	13	DF	(Saudi Arabia)	Hassan Muath	0	0	1	1
9	14	DF	(Saudi Arabia)	Abdullah Al-Zori	1	0	0	1
9	20	DF	(Saudi Arabia)	Ahmed Sharahili	0	1	0	1
9	81	MF	(Senegal)	Alfred N'Diaye	0	1	0	1
Own goal					0	0	0	0
Total					38	7	14	59

Last Updated: 9 September 2020

=== Assists ===
Rank	No.	Pos	Nat	Name	Pro League	King Cup	Arab Club Champions Cup	Total
1	10	MF	(Argentina)	Cristian Guanca	5	3	0	8
2	70	MF	(Colombia)	Danilo Asprilla	6	0	1	7
2	92	MF	(Brazil)	Sebá	5	0	2	7
4	17	DF	(Saudi Arabia)	Abdullah Al-Shamekh	3	0	3	6
5	8	MF	(Saudi Arabia)	Abdulmajeed Al-Sulayhem	3	2	0	5
6	12	DF	(Saudi Arabia)	Mohammed Salem	2	0	2	4
7	9	FW	(Saudi Arabia)	Abdullah Al-Hamdan	2	0	1	3
8	3	DF	(Saudi Arabia)	Fahad Ghazi	1	0	0	1
8	5	DF	(Algeria)	Djamel Benlamri	0	0	1	1
8	13	DF	(Saudi Arabia)	Hassan Muath	1	0	0	1
8	15	FW	(Saudi Arabia)	Mohammad Al-Sahlawi	1	0	0	1
8	90	FW	(Senegal)	Makhete Diop	1	0	0	1
Total					30	5	10	45

Last Updated: 9 September 2020

=== Clean sheets ===
Rank	No.	Pos	Nat	Name	Pro League	King Cup	Arab Club Champions Cup	Total
1	1	GK	(Tunisia)	Farouk Ben Mustapha	9	0	0	9
2	30	GK	(Saudi Arabia)	Abdullah Al-Owaishir	0	0	4	4
3	23	GK	(Saudi Arabia)	Marwan Al-Haidari	1	1	0	2
Total					10	1	4	15

Last Updated: 9 September 2020
