= 2018–19 Al-Shabab FC season =

Al-Shabab
2018–19 season
- President: Khaled Al-Baltan
- Manager: Marius Șumudică
- Stadium: Prince Faisal bin Fahd Stadium; King Fahd International Stadium
- SPL: 5th
- King Cup: Round of 16 (knocked out by Al-Taawoun)
- Top goalscorer: League: Constantin Budescu (7); All: Constantin Budescu (8)
- Highest home attendance: 14,530 vs Al-Nassr (28 February 2019)
- Lowest home attendance: 594 vs Al-Raed (4 February 2019)
- Average home league attendance: 3,428
- All statistics correct as of 16 May 2019.

The 2018–19 season was Al-Shabab's 42nd non-consecutive season in the top flight of Saudi football and 72nd year in existence as a football club. This season Al-Shabab participated in the Pro League and King Cup.

The season covers the period from 1 July 2018 to 30 June 2019.

== Players ==
=== Squad information ===
As of 4 February 2019

Note: Flags indicate national team as defined under FIFA eligibility rules; some limited exceptions apply. Players may hold more than one non-FIFA nationality.

No.	Pos.	Nation	Player
1	GK	TUN	Farouk Ben Mustapha
2	DF	KSA	Abdulmajeed Arishi
3	DF	KSA	Fahad Ghazi
4	DF	KSA	Hassan Tombakti
5	DF	ALG	Djamel Benlamri
7	MF	KSA	Turki Al-Ammar
8	MF	KSA	Abdulmajeed Al-Sulayhem
10	MF	ROU	Constantin Budescu
11	MF	KSA	Abdulmalek Al-Shammeri
12	DF	KSA	Mohammed Salem
13	DF	KSA	Hassan Muath
18	MF	KSA	Waleed Al-Enezi
19	MF	KSA	Nawaf Al-Habashi
20	FW	KSA	Abdullah Al-Hamdan

No.	Pos.	Nation	Player
21	MF	KSA	Nasser Al-Omran
22	GK	KSA	Mohammed Awaji
24	DF	KSA	Mohammed Al-Baqawi
25	DF	ROU	Valerică Găman
26	DF	KSA	Ali Majrashi
29	FW	GAM	Bubacarr Trawally
30	GK	KSA	Fahad Al-Habib
32	MF	KSA	Abdulelah Al-Shammeri
34	MF	MAR	Mbark Boussoufa
50	GK	KSA	Abdullah Al-Sudairy
77	MF	KSA	Khalid Kaabi
88	MF	BRA	Luiz Antônio
92	FW	BRA	Sebá
99	FW	KSA	Hassan Al-Raheb

==== Out on loan ====
Note: Flags indicate national team as defined under FIFA eligibility rules; some limited exceptions apply. Players may hold more than one non-FIFA nationality.

No.	Pos.	Nation	Player
9	FW	BRA	Arthur Caíke (at Bahia until 30 June 2019)
31	DF	KSA	Muaid Moaafa (at Al-Kawkab until 30 June 2019)
35	DF	KSA	Hassan Raghfawi (at Damac until 30 June 2019)

No.	Pos.	Nation	Player
56	MF	KSA	Hassan Al-Qeed (at Al-Khaleej until 30 June 2019)
—	DF	KSA	Faisal Hadadi (at Al-Washm until 30 June 2019)

== Transfers ==
=== In ===
Date	Pos.	Name	Previous club	Fee	Source
30 May 2018	GK	(Saudi Arabia) Mansour Jawhar	(Saudi Arabia) Al-Qaisumah	End of loan	
30 May 2018	DF	(Saudi Arabia) Faisal Hadadi	(Saudi Arabia) Al-Qaisumah	End of loan	
30 May 2018	DF	(Saudi Arabia) Hassan Raghfawi	(Saudi Arabia) Al-Mujazzal	End of loan	
30 May 2018	MF	(Saudi Arabia) Abdulaziz Al-Bishi	(Saudi Arabia) Al-Taawoun	End of loan	
30 May 2018	MF	(Saudi Arabia) Waleed Al-Enezi	(Saudi Arabia) Al-Batin	End of loan	
30 May 2018	MF	(Saudi Arabia) Faisal Al-Johani	(Saudi Arabia) Al-Kawkab	End of loan	
30 May 2018	MF	(Saudi Arabia) Ali Al-Nemer	(Spain) Numancia	End of loan	
30 May 2018	MF	(Saudi Arabia) Abdulmalek Al-Shammeri	(Saudi Arabia) Al-Batin	End of loan	
30 May 2018	MF	(Saudi Arabia) Abdulmajeed Al-Sulayhem	(Spain) Rayo Vallecano	End of loan	
30 May 2018	MF	(Saudi Arabia) Abdurahman Khairallah	(Saudi Arabia) Al-Taawoun	End of loan	
30 May 2018	MF	(Saudi Arabia) Jaber Mustafa	(Spain) Villarreal B	End of loan	
30 May 2018	FW	(Saudi Arabia) Abdullah Al-Hamdan	(Spain) Sporting Gijón	End of loan	
19 June 2018	DF	(Brazil) Euller	(Japan) Avispa Fukuoka	Undisclosed	
8 July 2018	DF	(Romania) Valerică Găman	(Romania) FCSB	€75,000	
12 July 2018	MF	(Romania) Constantin Budescu	(Romania) FCSB	€2,500,000	
20 July 2018	MF	(Brazil) Somália	(France) Toulouse	€1,500,000	
28 July 2018	FW	(Brazil) Arthur Caíke	(Brazil) Chapecoense	€2,000,000	
5 August 2018	MF	(Brazil) Luiz Antônio	(Brazil) Chapecoense	€340,000	
23 August 2018	GK	(Saudi Arabia) Raghid Al-Najjar	(Saudi Arabia) Al-Ahli	Free	
29 October 2018	FW	(Saudi Arabia) Hassan Al-Raheb	(Saudi Arabia) Al-Nassr	Free	
3 January 2019	MF	(Morocco) Mbark Boussoufa	(United Arab Emirates) Al-Jazira	Free	
15 January 2019	MF	(Brazil) Sebá	(Greece) Olympiacos	€300,000	
24 January 2019	DF	(Saudi Arabia) Hassan Muath	(Saudi Arabia) Al-Ittihad	Free	
1 February 2019	DF	(Saudi Arabia) Mohammed Al-Baqawi	(Saudi Arabia) Al-Hilal	Free	
2 February 2019	FW	(The Gambia) Bubacarr Trawally	(Denmark) Vejle	Undisclosed	

=== Out ===
Date	Pos.	Name	New club	Fee	Source
11 May 2018	MF	(Saudi Arabia) Saud Kariri	Retired		
14 May 2018	FW	(Algeria) Mohamed Benyettou	(United Arab Emirates) Al-Fujairah	Free	
30 May 2018	DF	(Saudi Arabia) Hassan Muath	(Saudi Arabia) Al-Fayha	End of loan	
30 May 2018	MF	(Egypt) Amr Barakat	(Egypt) Al-Ahly	End of loan	
8 June 2018	MF	(Saudi Arabia) Jaber Mustafa	(Saudi Arabia) Al-Ittihad	Undisclosed	
8 June 2018	MF	(Saudi Arabia) Ahmed Otaif	Retired		
9 June 2018	MF	(Saudi Arabia) Abdulaziz Al-Bishi	(Saudi Arabia) Al-Faisaly	Free	
10 June 2018	DF	(Saudi Arabia) Abdullah Al-Fahad	(Saudi Arabia) Al-Raed	Free	
12 June 2018	MF	(Saudi Arabia) Abdulwahab Jaafer	(Saudi Arabia) Al-Hazem	Free	
1 July 2018	FW	(Chile) Sebastián Ubilla	Universidad de Chile	Free	
17 July 2018	MF	(Saudi Arabia) Ali Al-Nemer	(Saudi Arabia) Al-Wehda	Undisclosed	
19 July 2018	FW	(Saudi Arabia) Abdullah Al-Meqbas	(Saudi Arabia) Al-Kawkab	Free	
20 July 2018	MF	(Saudi Arabia) Majed Al-Hantoushi	(Saudi Arabia) Al-Mujazzal	Free	
23 July 2018	GK	(Saudi Arabia) Mansour Jawhar	(Saudi Arabia) Al-Shoulla	Free	
23 July 2018	MF	(Saudi Arabia) Talal Al-Enezi	(Saudi Arabia) Al-Mujazzal	Free	
30 July 2018	MF	(Saudi Arabia) Abdurahman Khairallah	(Saudi Arabia) Al-Washm	Free	
12 August 2018	MF	(Iraq) Saad Abdul-Amir	(Iraq) Al-Shorta	Free	
25 August 2018	FW	(Saudi Arabia) Ghanem Al-Qahtani	(Saudi Arabia) Al-Dera'a	Free	
1 October 2018	GK	(Saudi Arabia) Rakan Al-Mallah	(Saudi Arabia) Al-Dera'a	Free	
15 December 2018	MF	(Libya) Muaid Ellafi	(Algeria) USM Alger	Free	
1 January 2019	DF	(Brazil) Euller		Released	
5 January 2019	FW	(Saudi Arabia) Rakhi Al-Shammeri	(Saudi Arabia) Al-Jabalain	Free	
17 January 2019	MF	(Saudi Arabia) Abdullah Al-Sobeai	(Saudi Arabia) Al-Raed	Free	
17 January 2019	MF	(Saudi Arabia) Moshari Al-Thamali		Released	
19 January 2019	GK	(Saudi Arabia) Raghid Al-Najjar	(Saudi Arabia) Al-Faisaly	Free	
1 February 2019	MF	(Saudi Arabia) Hattan Bahebri	(Saudi Arabia) Al-Hilal	€3,490,000	
2 February 2019	MF	(Saudi Arabia) Abdullah Al-Khaibari	(Saudi Arabia) Al-Nassr	€1,160,000	
4 February 2019	MF	(Saudi Arabia) Faisal Al-Johani	(Saudi Arabia) Najran	Free	
19 February 2019	DF	(Saudi Arabia) Saleh Al-Qumaizi	(Saudi Arabia) Al-Ettifaq	Free	
19 February 2019	FW	(Saudi Arabia) Nasser Al-Shamrani	(Saudi Arabia) Al-Ittihad	Free	
28 February 2019	MF	(Saudi Arabia) Mohammed Al-Qarni	(Saudi Arabia) Al-Wehda	Free	
3 March 2019	DF	(Saudi Arabia) Abdulaziz Haroon	(Saudi Arabia) Al-Khaleej	Free	

=== Loans out ===
Date	Pos.	Name	Subsequent club	End date	Source
11 June 2018	DF	(Saudi Arabia) Faisal Hadadi	(Saudi Arabia) Al-Washm	End of season	
22 July 2018	DF	(Saudi Arabia) Muaid Moaafa	(Saudi Arabia) Al-Kawkab	End of season	
22 August 2018	DF	(Saudi Arabia) Hassan Raghfawi	(Saudi Arabia) Damac	End of season	
23 August 2018	MF	(Saudi Arabia) Hassan Al-Qeed	(Saudi Arabia) Al-Khaleej	End of season	
6 February 2019	FW	(Brazil) Arthur Caíke	(Brazil) Bahia	End of season	

== Competitions ==
=== Overall ===
Competition	Started round	Current position / round	Final position / round	First match	Last match
Pro League	—	—	5th	31 August 2018	16 May 2019
King Cup	Round of 64	—	Round of 16	2 January 2019	23 January 2019

Last Updated: 16 May 2019

=== Pro League ===
==== League table ====
Pos	Team	Pld	W	D	L	GF	GA	GD	Pts	Qualification or relegation
3	Al-Taawoun	30	16	8	6	61	31	+30	56	Qualification for AFC Champions League group stage (Note: Al-Taawoun qualified for the AFC Champions League group stage as 2019 King Cup winners.)
4	Al-Ahli	30	17	4	9	68	41	+27	55	Qualification for AFC Champions League play-off round
5	Al-Shabab	30	15	9	6	39	25	+14	54	Qualification for Arab Club Champions Cup
6	Al-Faisaly	30	12	7	11	51	47	+4	43	
7	Al-Wehda	30	12	6	12	41	41	0	42	

Source: spl.com
Rules for classification: 1) Points; 2) Head-to-head points; 3) Head-to-head goal difference; 4) Total goal difference; 5) Total goals scored; 6) Play-off (only for deciding champion, relegation and AFC competitions participation).

==== Results summary ====
Overall								Home						Away					
Pld	W	D	L	GF	GA	GD	Pts	W	D	L	GF	GA	GD	W	D	L	GF	GA	GD
30	15	9	6	39	25	+14	54	8	4	3	21	13	+8	7	5	3	18	12	+6

Last updated: 16 May 2019.
Source: Competitive matches

==== Results by round ====
Round	1	2	3	4	5	6	7	8	9	10	11	12	13	14	15	16	17	18	19	20	21	22	23	24	25	26	27	28	29	30
Ground	H	A	H	A	A	H	H	A	A	A	H	H	A	H	A	H	A	H	A	H	A	H	H	A	A	H	A	H	H	A
Result	W	W	D	D	D	L	W	W	D	L	D	W	W	W	W	W	D	D	L	W	W	L	W	D	W	L	W	W	D	L
Position	3	2	4	5	5	8	7	5	4	5	6	6	5	3	3	3	3	3	4	3	3	3	3	3	3	3	3	3	3	5

Updated to match(es) played on 16 May 2019. Source: Competitive matches
A = Away; H = Home; W = Win; D = Draw; L = Loss

==== Matches ====
All times are local, AST (UTC+3).

Win Draw Loss Postponed

31 August 2018 1	Al-Shabab	1–0	Al-Ittihad	Riyadh
18:55	Al-Shamrani 79'	Report	Al-Zaqaan (yellow card) 87'	Stadium: Prince Faisal bin Fahd Stadium; Attendance: 9,885; Referee: Damir Skomina (Slovenia)

14 September 2018 2	Al-Fayha	1–3	Al-Shabab	Al-Majma'ah
18:45	Găman 47' (o.g.); Al-Barakah (yellow card) 75'; Al-Sobhi (yellow card) 78'	Report	Al-Khaibari (yellow card) 58'; Arthur 60'; Benlamri (yellow card) 70'; Ben Mustapha (yellow card) 71'; Budescu 79'; Luiz Antônio (yellow card) 90+5'; Al-Shamrani 90+6'	Stadium: King Salman Sport City Stadium; Attendance: 1,502; Referee: Ovidiu Hațegan (Romania)

20 September 2018 3	Al-Shabab	1–1	Al-Fateh	Riyadh
18:30	Arthur 9'; Bahebri (yellow card) 36'; Al-Qumayzi (yellow card) 78'; Al-Sulaiheem (yellow card) 82'	Report	Aguirregaray 25', (yellow card) 90+1'	Stadium: Prince Faisal bin Fahd Stadium; Attendance: 2,552; Referee: Paweł Raczkowski (Poland)

28 September 2018 4	Al-Raed	1–1	Al-Shabab	Buraidah
18:35	Bangoura 9' (pen.), (red card) 61'; Al-Shamekh (yellow card) 27'; Amora (yellow card) 71'; Hammoudan (yellow card) 90+7'	Report	Euller (yellow card) 8'; Al-Shamrani 13'; Bahebri (yellow card) 25'; Benlamri (yellow card) 77'; Al-Khaibari (yellow card) 90'	Stadium: King Abdullah Sport City Stadium; Attendance: 2,891; Referee: Simon Lee Evans (Wales)

5 October 2018 5	Al-Taawoun	1–1	Al-Shabab	Buraidah
18:25	Manoel (yellow card) 37'; Héldon 69'; Al-Zubaidi (yellow card) 71'; Jhonnattann (yellow card) 90+4'	Report	Al-Shamrani 3'; Salem (yellow card) 55'; Găman (yellow card) 90+5'; Al-Shammeri (red card) 90+8'	Stadium: King Abdullah Sport City Stadium; Attendance: 2,700; Referee: Damir Skomina (Slovenia)

20 October 2018 6	Al-Shabab	0–1	Al-Hilal	Riyadh
19:45	Salem (yellow card) 50'; Euller (red card) 61'; Bahebri (yellow card) 67'; Benlamri (yellow card) 90+4'	Report	Al-Dawsari (yellow card) 50'; Al-Breik (yellow card) 63'; Kanno 65', (yellow card) 74'; Al-Bulaihi (yellow card) 82'	Stadium: Prince Faisal bin Fahd Stadium; Attendance: 6,260; Referee: Danny Makkelie (Netherlands)

26 October 2018 7	Al-Shabab	2–1	Al-Qadsiah	Riyadh
18:05	Ghazi (yellow card) 16'; Luiz Antônio 40'; Kaabi (yellow card) 90+5', (goal) 90+6'	Report	F. Fallatah (yellow card) 14'; Élton 36'; Al-Shoeil (yellow card) 45'; Jorginho (red card) 45+4'; Williams (yellow card) 90+5'	Stadium: Prince Faisal bin Fahd Stadium; Attendance: 1,235; Referee: Simon Lee Evans (Wales)

1 November 2018 8	Al-Wehda	0–1	Al-Shabab	Mecca
18:25	Renato Chaves (yellow card) 20'	Report	Bahebri 51'; Al-Shamrani (yellow card) 85'	Stadium: King Abdul Aziz Stadium; Referee: Mark Clattenburg (England)

8 November 2018 9	Al-Faisaly	0–0	Al-Shabab	Al Majma'ah
17:50		Report	Al-Qumaizi (yellow card) 90+1'	Stadium: King Salman Sport City Stadium; Attendance: 802; Referee: Milorad Mažić (Serbia)

23 November 2018 10	Al-Nassr	1–0	Al-Shabab	Riyadh
19:40	Musa 35'; Al-Shehri (yellow card) 59'; Petros (red card) 74'	Report	Găman (yellow card) 18'; Benlamri (yellow card) 41' (yellow-red card) 90+5'; Bahebri (yellow card) 62'; Budescu (yellow card) 65'; Salem (yellow card) 90'	Stadium: Prince Faisal bin Fahd Stadium; Attendance: 4,331; Referee: Pavel Královec (Czech Republic)

29 November 2018 11	Al-Shabab	2–2	Al-Ettifaq	Riyadh
17:45	Budescu 36'; Al-Ammar (yellow card) 45'; Kaabi 64', (yellow card) 80'; Al-Sulayhem (yellow card) 76'; Somália (yellow card) 79'	Report	Guanca 31'; Al-Habib 42'	Stadium: Prince Faisal bin Fahd Stadium; Attendance: 866; Referee: Kevin Blom (Netherlands)

6 December 2018 12	Al-Shabab	1–0	Ohod	Riyadh
17:45	Luiz Antônio 50'; Al-Raheb (yellow card) 76'; Euller (yellow card) 90+3'	Report	Šipović (yellow card) 21'; Mohammed (yellow card) 52'; Al-Hafdhi (yellow card) 75'	Stadium: Prince Faisal bin Fahd Stadium; Attendance: 1,214; Referee: Pavel Královec (Czech Republic)

15 December 2018 13	Al-Ahli	0–1	Al-Shabab	Jeddah
18:25	Abdel Shafy (yellow card) 11'; Jurado (yellow card) 18'; Alexis (yellow card) 25'; Al-Mowalad (yellow card) 41'; Souza (yellow card) 86'	Report	Al-Sulayhem (yellow card) 71'; Ghazi (yellow card) 88'; Arthur 90+5'	Stadium: King Abdullah Sports City; Attendance: 20,876; Referee: Szymon Marciniak (Poland)

21 December 2018 14	Al-Shabab	4–0	Al-Batin	Riyadh
15:10	Arthur 20', 36'; Budescu 22', 59'; Ghazi (yellow card) 60'; Al-Khaibari (yellow card) 85'	Report		Stadium: Prince Faisal bin Fahd Stadium; Attendance: 1,073; Referee: Mark Clattenburg (England)

28 December 2018 15	Al-Hazem	1–3	Al-Shabab	Buraidah
15:20	Alemão 27'; Al-Kaebi (yellow card) 73'	Report	Arthur 7'; Găman 22'; Somália 71'	Stadium: King Abdullah Sport City Stadium; Attendance: 802; Referee: Björn Kuipers (Netherlands)

11 January 2019 16	Al-Shabab	4–1	Al-Fayha	Riyadh
15:25	Al-Shamrani 25'; Al-Sulayhem 67'; Salem (yellow card) 70'; Budescu 76' (pen.), 90+3'	Report	Al-Khaibari (yellow card) 53'; Al Salem 71'; Yahaya (yellow card) 74'; Al-Owdah (yellow card) 78'	Stadium: Prince Khalid bin Sultan Stadium; Attendance: 1,559; Referee: Pawel Raczkowski (Poland)

29 January 2019 17	Al-Ittihad	0–0	Al-Shabab	Jeddah
20:20	Sanogo (yellow card) 32'; Abdulhamid (yellow card) 56'	Report		Stadium: King Abdullah Sports City; Attendance: 46,575; Referee: Bakary Gassama (Gambia)

4 February 2019 18	Al-Shabab	1–1	Al-Raed	Al Majma'ah
18:25	Budescu 10' (pen.); Salem (yellow card) 18'; Găman (yellow card) 41'; Al-Shammeri (yellow card) 80'	Report	Belkaroui (yellow card) 9'; Al-Shamekh 42'; Amora (yellow card) 90+5'	Stadium: King Salman Sport City Stadium; Attendance: 594; Referee: Nawaf Shukralla (Bahrain)

9 February 2019 19	Al-Fateh	1–0	Al-Shabab	Al-Hasa
18:10	Korzun (yellow card) 50'; Hamzi (yellow card) 65'; Hamzah (yellow card) 76'; Chenihi 88'	Report	Muath (yellow card) 35' (yellow-red card) 56'	Stadium: Prince Abdullah bin Jalawi Stadium; Attendance: 2,849; Referee: Martin van den Kerkhof (Netherlands)

15 February 2019 20	Al-Shabab	1–0	Al-Wehda	Riyadh
18:30	Boussoufa (yellow card) 23'; Sebá (red card) 27'; Luiz Antônio 45+1'; Al-Hamdan (yellow card) 88'	Report	Al-Zori (yellow card) 29'; Al-Amri (yellow card) 60'	Stadium: Prince Faisal bin Fahd Stadium; Attendance: 1,491; Referee: Damir Skomina (Slovenia)

22 February 2019 21	Al-Qadsiah	0–1	Al-Shabab	Khobar
18:15	F. Fallatah (yellow card) 11'; Camara (yellow card) 16'; Al-Khabrani (yellow card) 56'; Belkhiter (yellow card) 82'	Report	Al-Hamdan (yellow card) 62'; Benlamri (yellow card) 81', (goal) 85'	Stadium: Prince Saud bin Jalawi Stadium; Attendance: 1,322; Referee: Matthew Conger (New Zealand)

28 February 2019 22	Al-Shabab	0–1	Al-Nassr	Riyadh
20:30	Găman (yellow card) 32'; Benlamri (yellow card) 38'; Al-Sulayhem (yellow card) 43'; Luiz Antônio (yellow card) 86'	Report	Hamdallah 38'; Amrabat (yellow card) 51'; Petros (yellow card) 90+4'	Stadium: King Fahd International Stadium; Attendance: 14,530; Referee: Anastasios Sidiropoulos (Greece)

7 March 2019 23	Al-Shabab	2–1	Al-Faisaly	Riyadh
18:40	Trawally 17'; Boussoufa 75'; Budescu (yellow card) 86'; Luiz Antônio (yellow card) 88'; Sebá (yellow card) 90+3'	Report	Luisinho (yellow card) 45', (goal) 82' (pen.); Igor Rossi (yellow card) 77'	Stadium: Prince Faisal bin Fahd Stadium; Attendance: 1,302; Referee: Pol van Boekel (Netherlands)

15 March 2019 24	Al-Ettifaq	1–1	Al-Shabab	Dammam
20:00	Mahnashi 45+4'; Al-Habib (yellow card) 46'; Salem (yellow card) 88'; Kiss (yellow card) 90+5'	Report	Trawally 23'; Al-Shammeri (yellow card) 52'	Stadium: Prince Mohamed bin Fahd Stadium; Attendance: 3,613; Referee: Szymon Marciniak (Poland)

30 March 2019 25	Ohod	1–2	Al-Shabab	Medina
19:15	Majed Hazazi 21', (red card) 86'; Hamad (yellow card) 45+2'; Belaïd (yellow card) 77'; Mohammed (yellow card) 81'; Fouzair (yellow card) 90+2'	Report	Sebá 18'; Găman (yellow card) 28'; Trawally (yellow card) 34', (goal) 36'; Al-Enezi (yellow card) 90+3'; Ben Mustapha (yellow card) 90+11'	Stadium: Prince Mohammed bin Abdul Aziz Stadium; Attendance: 5,799; Referee: Viktor Kassai (Hungary)

5 April 2019 26	Al-Shabab	0–4	Al-Ahli	Riyadh
20:45	Benlamri (yellow card) 61'; Boussoufa (yellow card) 72'	Report	Al-Fatil (yellow card) 21', (goal) 33'; Djaniny 38', 53'; Díaz (yellow card) 58'; Al-Moasher 63'	Stadium: Prince Faisal bin Fahd Stadium; Attendance: 5,312; Referee: Felix Brych (Germany)

11 April 2019 27	Al-Batin	1–2	Al-Shabab	Hafar al-Batin
19:00	Al-Mozairib (yellow card) 11'; Kanabah (yellow card) 43'; Ghunaiman (yellow card) 45+2'; Crysan 90+4' (pen.)	Report	Sebá (yellow card) 7', (goal) 37', 65'; Al-Sulayhem (yellow card) 41'; Awaji (yellow card) 90+2'	Stadium: Al-Batin Club Stadium; Attendance: 3,126; Referee: Ravshan Irmatov (Uzbekistan)

20 April 2019 28	Al-Shabab	2–0	Al-Hazem	Riyadh
18:55	Sebá 5', 37'; Trawally (yellow card) 65'; Găman (yellow card) 81'	Report	Alemão (yellow card) 60'; Al-Khalaf (yellow card) 90+2'	Stadium: Prince Faisal bin Fahd Stadium; Attendance: 1,276; Referee: Damir Skomina (Slovenia)

11 May 2019 29	Al-Shabab	0–0	Al-Taawoun	Riyadh
22:30	Boussoufa (yellow card) 78'	Report	Al-Mousa (yellow card) 11'; Tawamba (yellow card) 67'; Manoel (yellow card) 81'; Cássio (yellow card) 90+4'	Stadium: Prince Faisal bin Fahd Stadium; Attendance: 1,474; Referee: Pavel Královec (Czech Republic)

16 May 2019 30	Al-Hilal	3–2	Al-Shabab	Riyadh
22:30	Gomis 8', 90+1'; Giovinco 52'	Report	Benlamri (yellow card) 45+1'; Sebá 67'; Al-Sulayhem 87'	Stadium: King Saud University Stadium; Attendance: 10,000; Referee: Daniele Orsato (Italy)

=== King Cup ===
All times are local, AST (UTC+3).

2 January 2019 Round of 64	Al-Shabab	3–0	Al-Sahel	Riyadh
15:20	Kaabi 19'; Găman 35'; Luiz Antônio 37'; Al-Omran (yellow card) 65'	Report	Majrashi (yellow card) 64'	Stadium: Prince Khalid bin Sultan Stadium; Referee: Raed Al-Zahrani

18 January 2019 Round of 32	Jeddah	0–2	Al-Shabab	Jeddah
20:00	Al-Jubairi (yellow card) 43'; Al-Muwallad (yellow card) 47'; Zoe (yellow card) 89'	Report	Budescu (yellow card) 18', (goal) 49'; Benlamri (yellow card) 90+1'; Kaabi 90+3'	Stadium: King Abdullah Sports City; Referee: Faisal Al-Blwi

23 January 2019 Round of 16	Al-Taawoun	3–0	Al-Shabab	Buraidah
18:20	Sufyani 10'; Héldon 41' (pen.); Al-Zubaidi 45'; Amissi (yellow card) 55'	Report	Boussoufa (yellow card) 37'; Ben Mustapha (yellow card) 45'; Luiz Antônio (yellow card) 48'; Ghazi (yellow card) 56'	Stadium: King Abdullah Sport City Stadium; Referee: Ovidiu Hațegan (Romania)

== Statistics ==
=== Squad statistics ===
Last updated on 16 May 2019.

No.	Pos	Nat	Player	Total		Pro League		King Cup	
No.	Pos	Nat	Player	Apps	Goals	Apps	Goals	Apps	Goals
Goalkeepers
1	GK	(Tunisia)	Farouk Ben Mustapha	29	0	27	0	2	0
22	GK	(Saudi Arabia)	Mohammed Awaji	3	0	2	0	1	0
30	GK	(Saudi Arabia)	Fahad Al-Habib	0	0	0	0	0	0
50	GK	(Saudi Arabia)	Abdullah Al-Sudairy	1	0	1	0	0	0
Defenders
2	DF	(Saudi Arabia)	Abdulmajeed Arishi	0	0	0	0	0	0
3	DF	(Saudi Arabia)	Fahad Ghazi	12	0	7+2	0	3	0
4	DF	(Saudi Arabia)	Hassan Tombakti	1	0	0	0	1	0
5	DF	(Algeria)	Djamel Benlamri	27	1	25	1	2	0
12	DF	(Saudi Arabia)	Mohammed Salem	29	0	25+2	0	2	0
13	DF	(Saudi Arabia)	Hassan Muath	11	0	11	0	0	0
24	DF	(Saudi Arabia)	Mohammed Al-Baqawi	5	0	1+4	0	0	0
25	DF	(Romania)	Valerică Găman	29	2	27	1	2	1
26	DF	(Saudi Arabia)	Ali Majrashi	2	0	0+1	0	1	0
Midfielders
7	MF	(Saudi Arabia)	Turki Al-Ammar	4	0	1+2	0	1	0
8	MF	(Saudi Arabia)	Abdulmajeed Al-Sulayhem	25	2	19+4	2	2	0
10	MF	(Romania)	Constantin Budescu	24	8	16+6	7	2	1
11	MF	(Saudi Arabia)	Abdulmalek Al-Shammeri	22	0	17+4	0	0+1	0
18	MF	(Saudi Arabia)	Waleed Al-Enezi	15	0	2+10	0	1+2	0
19	MF	(Saudi Arabia)	Nawaf Al-Habashi	3	0	0+2	0	0+1	0
21	MF	(Saudi Arabia)	Nasser Al-Omran	2	0	0+1	0	0+1	0
32	MF	(Saudi Arabia)	Abdulelah Al-Shammeri	0	0	0	0	0	0
34	MF	(Morocco)	Mbark Boussoufa	15	1	13	1	2	0
77	MF	(Saudi Arabia)	Khalid Kaabi	25	4	7+15	2	2+1	2
88	MF	(Brazil)	Luiz Antônio	32	4	28+1	3	3	1
92	MF	(Brazil)	Sebá	13	6	11+1	6	0+1	0
Forwards
20	FW	(Saudi Arabia)	Abdullah Al-Hamdan	10	0	1+8	0	0+1	0
29	FW	(The Gambia)	Bubacarr Trawally	11	3	10+1	3	0	0
99	FW	(Saudi Arabia)	Hassan Al-Raheb	8	0	0+8	0	0	0
Players sent out on loan this season
9	FW	(Brazil)	Arthur Caíke	16	6	12+3	6	1	0
Player who made an appearance this season but have left the club
6	MF	(Saudi Arabia)	Abdullah Al-Khaibari	12	0	10+2	0	0	0
15	FW	(Saudi Arabia)	Nasser Al-Shamrani	20	5	18	5	1+1	0
16	DF	(Brazil)	Euller	10	0	9+1	0	0	0
17	DF	(Saudi Arabia)	Saleh Al-Qumaizi	14	0	11+1	0	2	0
27	MF	(Saudi Arabia)	Hattan Bahebri	12	1	11+1	1	0	0
28	DF	(Saudi Arabia)	Abdulaziz Haroon	0	0	0	0	0	0
33	MF	(Brazil)	Somália	17	1	8+7	1	2	0
36	GK	(Saudi Arabia)	Raghid Al-Najjar	0	0	0	0	0	0

=== Goalscorers ===
Rank	No.	Pos	Nat	Name	Pro League	King Cup	Total
1	10	MF	(Romania)	Constantin Budescu	7	1	8
2	9	FW	(Brazil)	Arthur Caíke	6	0	6
2	92	MF	(Brazil)	Sebá	6	0	6
4	15	FW	(Saudi Arabia)	Nasser Al-Shamrani	5	0	5
5	77	MF	(Saudi Arabia)	Khalid Kaabi	2	2	4
5	88	MF	(Brazil)	Luiz Antônio	3	1	4
7	29	FW	(The Gambia)	Bubacarr Trawally	3	0	3
8	8	MF	(Saudi Arabia)	Abdulmajeed Al-Sulayhem	2	0	2
8	25	DF	(Romania)	Valerică Găman	1	1	2
10	5	DF	(Algeria)	Djamel Benlamri	1	0	1
10	27	MF	(Saudi Arabia)	Hattan Bahebri	1	0	1
10	33	MF	(Brazil)	Somália	1	0	1
10	34	MF	(Morocco)	Mbark Boussoufa	1	0	1
Own goal					1	0	1
Total					39	5	44

Last Updated: 16 May 2019

=== Assists ===
Rank	No.	Pos	Nat	Name	Pro League	King Cup	Total
1	10	MF	(Romania)	Constantin Budescu	5	1	6
2	8	MF	(Saudi Arabia)	Abdulmajeed Al-Sulayhem	3	0	3
2	15	FW	(Saudi Arabia)	Nasser Al-Shamrani	3	0	3
2	88	MF	(Brazil)	Luiz Antônio	1	2	3
5	9	FW	(Brazil)	Arthur Caíke	2	0	2
5	12	DF	(Saudi Arabia)	Mohammed Salem	2	0	2
5	29	FW	(The Gambia)	Bubacarr Trawally	2	0	2
5	33	MF	(Brazil)	Somália	2	0	2
5	92	MF	(Brazil)	Sebá	2	0	2
10	3	DF	(Saudi Arabia)	Fahad Ghazi	1	0	1
10	5	DF	(Algeria)	Djamel Benlamri	1	0	1
10	13	DF	(Saudi Arabia)	Hassan Muath	1	0	1
10	16	DF	(Brazil)	Euller	1	0	1
10	21	MF	(Saudi Arabia)	Nasser Al-Omran	1	0	1
10	27	MF	(Saudi Arabia)	Hattan Bahebri	1	0	1
10	77	MF	(Saudi Arabia)	Khalid Kaabi	1	0	1
Total					29	3	32

Last Updated: 16 May 2019

=== Clean sheets ===
Rank	No.	Pos	Nat	Name	Pro League	King Cup	Total
1	1	GK	(Tunisia)	Farouk Ben Mustapha	10	1	11
2	22	GK	(Saudi Arabia)	Mohammed Awaji	1	1	2
Total					11	2	13

Last Updated: 11 May 2019
