= 2020–21 Al-Shabab FC season =

Al-Shabab
2020–21 season
- President: Khaled Al-Baltan
- Manager: Pedro Caixinha (until 5 January); Carlos Inarejos (from 5 January)
- Stadium: Prince Khalid bin Sultan Stadium
- SPL: 2nd
- King Cup: Round of 16 (knocked out by Al-Qadsiah)
- Arab Club Champions Cup: Semi-finals (knocked out by Al-Ittihad)
- Top goalscorer: League: Cristian Guanca (17); All: Cristian Guanca (18)
- All statistics correct as of 30 May 2021.

The 2020–21 season was Al-Shabab's 44th non-consecutive season in the top flight of Saudi football and 74th year in existence as a football club. The club participated in the Pro League, the King Cup and the Arab Club Champions Cup.

The season covered the period from 22 September 2020 to 30 June 2021.

== Players ==
=== Squad information ===
As of 7 February 2021

Note: Flags indicate national team as defined under FIFA eligibility rules; some limited exceptions apply. Players may hold more than one non-FIFA nationality.

No.	Pos.	Nation	Player
2	DF	CHI	Igor Lichnovsky
3	DF	KSA	Khalid Al-Ghamdi
4	DF	KSA	Abdullah Al-Zori
5	DF	KSA	Hassan Tambakti
6	MF	KSA	Abdulmalek Al-Khaibri
7	MF	KSA	Turki Al-Ammar
8	MF	ARG	Cristian Guanca
10	MF	ARG	Éver Banega
11	MF	POR	Fábio Martins (on loan from Braga)
12	DF	KSA	Mohammed Salem
13	DF	KSA	Khalid Al-Dubaysh
14	MF	KSA	Nawaf Al-Abed
15	MF	KSA	Hussain Al-Qahtani
17	DF	KSA	Abdullah Al-Shamekh

No.	Pos.	Nation	Player
19	MF	KSA	Jamal Bajandouh
20	DF	KSA	Ahmed Sharahili
21	MF	KSA	Nasser Al-Omran
23	GK	KSA	Marwan Al-Haidari
24	DF	KSA	Moteb Al-Harbi
26	MF	KSA	Hamad Al-Ghamdi
27	DF	KSA	Fawaz Al-Sqoor
33	GK	KSA	Zaid Al-Bawardi
38	MF	KSA	Ammar Al-Najjar
47	FW	KSA	Fares Al-Garzae
50	GK	KSA	Mohammed Al-Dossari
81	MF	SEN	Alfred N'Diaye
89	FW	NGA	Odion Ighalo
92	MF	BRA	Sebá

=== Out on loan ===
Note: Flags indicate national team as defined under FIFA eligibility rules; some limited exceptions apply. Players may hold more than one non-FIFA nationality.

No.	Pos.	Nation	Player
16	MF	KSA	Mohammed Attiyah (at Damac until 30 June 2021)
28	DF	KSA	Ali Majrashi (at Al-Faisaly until 30 June 2021)
29	MF	GAM	Bubacarr Trawally (at Ajman until 30 June 2021)
32	MF	KSA	Abdulelah Al-Shammeri (at Al-Tai until 30 June 2021)

No.	Pos.	Nation	Player
35	MF	KSA	Abdullah Haqawi (at Al-Lewa until 30 June 2021)
56	MF	KSA	Hassan Al-Qeed (at Al-Ahli until 30 June 2021)
—	MF	KSA	Abdulmalek Al-Shammeri (at Al-Batin until 30 June 2021)

== Transfers and loans ==
=== Transfers in ===
Entry date	Position	No.	Player	From club	Fee	Ref.
9 September 2020	MF	28	(Saudi Arabia) Hassan Al-Qeed	(Saudi Arabia) Abha	End of loan	
22 September 2020	GK	1	(Lithuania) Giedrius Arlauskis	(Romania) CFR Cluj	Free	
22 September 2020	GK	22	(Saudi Arabia) Mohammed Awaji	(Saudi Arabia) Al-Adalah	End of loan	
22 September 2020	DF	2	(Saudi Arabia) Mohammed Al-Baqawi	(Saudi Arabia) Al-Fayha	End of loan	
22 September 2020	DF	3	(Saudi Arabia) Khalid Al-Ghamdi	(Saudi Arabia) Al-Faisaly	Free	
22 September 2020	DF	5	(Saudi Arabia) Hassan Tambakti	(Saudi Arabia) Al-Wehda	End of loan	
22 September 2020	DF	27	(Saudi Arabia) Hassan Raghfawi	(Saudi Arabia) Damac	End of loan	
22 September 2020	MF	10	(Argentina) Éver Banega	(Spain) Sevilla	Free	
22 September 2020	MF	15	(Saudi Arabia) Hussain Al-Qahtani	(Saudi Arabia) Al-Faisaly	Free	
22 September 2020	MF	19	(Saudi Arabia) Jamal Bajandouh	(Croatia) Varaždin	Free	
22 September 2020	MF	26	(Saudi Arabia) Hamad Al-Ghamdi	(Saudi Arabia) Al-Ittihad	$186,000	
22 September 2020	MF	35	(Saudi Arabia) Abdullah Haqawi	(Saudi Arabia) Al-Kawkab	End of loan	
22 September 2020	MF	–	(Saudi Arabia) Nawaf Al-Habashi	(Saudi Arabia) Al-Qadsiah	End of loan	
22 September 2020	MF	–	(Saudi Arabia) Abdullah Al-Rubaie	(Saudi Arabia) Al-Akhdoud	Free	
1 October 2020	GK	33	(Saudi Arabia) Zaid Al-Bawardi	(Saudi Arabia) Al-Nassr	Free	
2 October 2020	DF	13	(Saudi Arabia) Khalid Al-Dubaysh	(Saudi Arabia) Al-Nassr	Free	
10 October 2020	DF	2	(Chile) Igor Lichnovsky	(Mexico) Cruz Azul	$3,000,000	
22 October 2020	DF	27	(Saudi Arabia) Fawaz Al-Sqoor	(Saudi Arabia) Al-Wehda	$1,200,000	
25 October 2020	MF	14	(Saudi Arabia) Nawaf Al-Abed	(Saudi Arabia) Al-Shabab	$1,060,000	
12 January 2021	FW	–	(Brazil) Arthur Caíke	(Brazil) Cruzeiro	End of loan	
4 February 2021	FW	89	(Nigeria) Odion Ighalo	(China) Shanghai Shenhua	$3,000,000	
7 February 2021	MF	38	(Saudi Arabia) Ammar Al-Najjar	(Saudi Arabia) Abha	$40,000	

=== Loans in ===
Start date	End date	Position	No.	Player	From club	Fee	Ref.
26 September 2020	End of season	MF	11	(Portugal) Fábio Martins	(Portugal) Braga	None	

=== Transfers out ===
Exit date	Position	No.	Player	To club	Fee	Ref.
9 September 2020	GK	30	(Saudi Arabia) Abdullah Al-Owaishir	(Saudi Arabia) Al-Nassr	End of loan	
9 September 2020	DF	32	(Saudi Arabia) Muteb Al-Mufarrij	(Saudi Arabia) Al-Hilal	End of loan	
9 September 2020	MF	8	(Saudi Arabia) Abdulmajeed Al-Sulayhem	(Saudi Arabia) Al-Nassr	Free	
22 September 2020	GK	1	(Tunisia) Farouk Ben Mustapha		Released	
24 September 2020	DF	27	(Saudi Arabia) Hassan Raghfawi	(Saudi Arabia) Al-Batin	Undisclosed	
1 October 2020	DF	38	(Saudi Arabia) Nawaf Al-Duraiwish	(Saudi Arabia) Al-Diriyah	Free	
2 October 2020	MF	70	(Colombia) Danilo Asprilla	(Saudi Arabia) Al-Qadsiah	Free	
6 October 2020	DF	5	(Algeria) Djamel Benlamri	(France) Lyon	Free	
9 October 2020	DF	2	(Saudi Arabia) Mohammed Al-Baqawi	(Saudi Arabia) Al-Fayha	$400,000	
12 October 2020	FW	99	(Saudi Arabia) Hassan Al-Raheb		Retired	
14 October 2020	GK	22	(Saudi Arabia) Mohammed Awaji	(Saudi Arabia) Al-Tai	Free	
16 October 2020	MF	–	(Saudi Arabia) Nawaf Al-Habashi	(Saudi Arabia) Al-Diriyah	Free	
29 October 2020	DF	45	(Saudi Arabia) Mohammed Al-Khaibari	(Saudi Arabia) Al-Hilal	Free	
12 January 2021	FW	–	(Brazil) Arthur Caíke	(Japan) Kashima Antlers	Free	
18 January 2021	DF	12	(Saudi Arabia) Hassan Muath	(Saudi Arabia) Al-Ain	Free	
1 February 2021	FW	99	(Senegal) Makhete Diop	(United Arab Emirates) Al-Dhafra	Free	
6 February 2021	GK	1	(Lithuania) Giedrius Arlauskis		Released	
6 February 2021	FW	9	(Saudi Arabia) Abdullah Al-Hamdan	(Saudi Arabia) Al-Hilal	$800,000	
7 February 2021	MF	18	(Saudi Arabia) Waleed Al-Enezi	(Saudi Arabia) Damac	Free	

=== Loans out ===
Start date	End date	Position	No.	Player	To club	Fee	Ref.
9 September 2020	End of season	MF	56	(Saudi Arabia) Hassan Al-Qeed	(Saudi Arabia) Al-Ahli	None	
26 September 2020	End of season	MF	16	(Saudi Arabia) Mohammed Attiyah	(Saudi Arabia) Damac	None	
28 September 2020	End of season	FW	29	(The Gambia) Bubacarr Trawally	(United Arab Emirates) Ajman	None	
2 October 2020	End of season	MF	11	(Saudi Arabia) Abdulmalek Al-Shammeri	(Saudi Arabia) Al-Batin	None	
13 October 2020	End of season	MF	32	(Saudi Arabia) Abdulelah Al-Shammeri	(Saudi Arabia) Al-Tai	None	
27 October 2020	End of season	MF	35	(Saudi Arabia) Abdullah Haqawi	(Saudi Arabia) Al-Lewa	None	
7 February 2021	End of season	DF	28	(Saudi Arabia) Ali Majrashi	(Saudi Arabia) Al-Faisaly	None	

== Pre-season ==
26 September 2020 Friendly	Al-Shabab (Saudi Arabia)	2–2	(Saudi Arabia) Al-Faisaly	Riyadh, Saudi Arabia
18:30 AST	Guanca 45+1', 49'	Report	Merkel 8'; Guilherme 18'	Stadium: Prince Khalid bin Sultan Stadium

1 October 2020 Friendly	Al-Shabab (Saudi Arabia)	6–0	(Saudi Arabia) Al-Diriyah	Riyadh, Saudi Arabia
18:25 AST	Guanca 2'; Diop 9', 42'; Al-Enezi 52'; Al-Ghamdi 86'; Sebá 90'	Report		Stadium: Prince Khalid bin Sultan Stadium

2 October 2020 Friendly	Al-Shabab (Saudi Arabia)	1–0	(Saudi Arabia) Al-Riyadh	Riyadh, Saudi Arabia
18:25 AST	Diop 90+2'	Report		Stadium: Prince Khalid bin Sultan Stadium

5 October 2020 Friendly	Al-Shabab (Saudi Arabia)	8–0	(Saudi Arabia) Al-Faraa	Riyadh, Saudi Arabia
18:30 AST	Guanca 3', 62'; Diop 8', 21', 35', 66'; Sebá 19'; K. Al-Ghamdi 81'	Report		Stadium: Prince Khalid bin Sultan Stadium

6 October 2020 Friendly	Al-Shabab (Saudi Arabia)	7–0	(Saudi Arabia) Al-Mehmal	Riyadh, Saudi Arabia
18:30 AST	Al-Ammar,, Sebá; Martins, Al-Qahtani			Stadium: Prince Khalid bin Sultan Stadium

8 October 2020 Friendly	Al-Shabab (Saudi Arabia)	3–0	(Saudi Arabia) Al-Sharq	Riyadh, Saudi Arabia
18:30 AST	K. Al-Ghamdi; Bajandouh; H. Al-Ghamdi	Report		Stadium: Prince Khalid bin Sultan Stadium

9 October 2020 Friendly	Al-Faisaly (Saudi Arabia)	1–2	(Saudi Arabia) Al-Shabab	Al Majma'ah, Saudi Arabia
18:25 AST	Al-Saiari 34'	Report	Majrashi 55'; Salem 90'	Stadium: Al Majma'ah Sports City

== Competitions ==
=== Overview ===
Competition	Record							
Competition	G	W	D	L	GF	GA	GD	Win %
Pro League	30	17	6	7	68	43	+25	56.67
King Cup	1	0	0	1	0	1	−1	0.00
Arab Club Champions Cup	2	0	1	1	3	4	−1	0.00
Total	33	17	7	9	71	48	+23	51.52

Updated to match played 30 May 2021
Source: Competitions

=== Pro League ===
==== League table ====
Pos	Team	Pld	W	D	L	GF	GA	GD	Pts	Qualification or relegation
1	Al-Hilal (C)	30	18	7	5	60	27	+33	61	Qualification for AFC Champions League group stage
2	Al-Shabab	30	17	6	7	68	43	+25	57	Qualification for AFC Champions League group stage
3	Al-Ittihad (Note: Al-Ittihad cannot qualify for Asian Football Confederation competitions as they did not obtain an AFC license.)	30	15	11	4	45	29	+16	56	
4	Al-Taawoun	30	13	8	9	42	30	+12	47 (Note: Positions determined by head-to-head points: Al-Taawoun 4 pts; Al-Ettifaq 1 pt.)	Qualification for AFC Champions League play-off round
5	Al-Ettifaq	30	14	5	11	50	48	+2	47	

Source: spl.com source=إحصائيات رابطة دوري المحترفين السعودي 2020-2021
Rules for classification: 1) Points; 2) Head-to-head points; 3) Head-to-head goal difference; 4) Total goal difference; 5) Total goals scored; 6) Fair-play points (Note: Head-to-head record is used only after all the matches between the teams in question have been played).
(C) Champions

==== Results summary ====
Overall								Home						Away					
Pld	W	D	L	GF	GA	GD	Pts	W	D	L	GF	GA	GD	W	D	L	GF	GA	GD
30	17	6	7	68	43	+25	57	9	3	3	30	18	+12	8	3	4	38	25	+13

Last updated: 30 May 2021.
Source: spl.com.sa

==== Results by round ====
Round	1	2	3	4	5	6	7	8	9	10	11	12	13	14	15	16	17	18	19	20	21	22	23	24	25	26	27	28	29	30
Ground	H	A	H	A	A	H	A	H	A	H	A	H	A	H	A	A	H	A	H	H	A	H	A	H	A	H	A	H	A	H
Result	W	D	W	W	D	W	L	D	L	W	D	W	W	D	W	W	W	W	L	W	W	D	L	L	W	L	L	W	W	W
Position	7	6	4	2	2	2	2	3	3	3	3	2	2	2	2	1	1	1	1	1	1	1	2	2	2	2	2	2	2	2

Updated to match(es) played on 30 May 2021. Source: spl.com.sa
A = Away; H = Home; W = Win; D = Draw; L = Loss

==== Matches ====
All times are local, AST (UTC+3).

Win Draw Loss Postponed

17 October 2020 1	Al-Shabab	1–0	Abha	Riyadh
18:00	Diop 29'; Al-Ammar (yellow card) 45+4'	Report	Al-Barakah (yellow card) 57'	Stadium: Prince Faisal bin Fahd Stadium; Attendance: 0 Referee: Mohammed Al-Hoaish

23 October 2020 2	Al-Raed	2–2	Al-Shabab	Buraidah
18:05	Daoudi 19' (pen.); Al-Hussain (yellow card) 86'; Khamis 89'	Report	Arlauskis (yellow card) 18'; Banega 38' (pen.); Martins (yellow card) 40'; Sharahili (yellow card) 45+5'; N'Diaye (yellow card) 57'; Guanca 62'; Al-Hamdan (yellow card) 70'	Stadium: King Abdullah Sport City Stadium; Attendance: 0 Referee: Sultan Al-Harbi

1 November 2020 3	Al-Shabab	2–1	Al-Nassr	Riyadh
19:50	Banega (yellow card) 26', (goal) 90+7' (pen.); Martins (yellow card) 37'; Sharahili 55', (yellow card) 82'	Report	Yahya 61'; Petros (yellow card) 77'	Stadium: Prince Faisal bin Fahd Stadium; Attendance: 0 Referee: Shukri Al-Hanfoush

7 November 2020 4	Al-Fateh	1–3	Al-Shabab	Al-Hasa
17:35	Al-Daheem (yellow card) 15'; Bendebka 37' (pen.); Al-Habib (red card) 85'; Al-Zaqaan (yellow card) 90'	Report	Al-Shamekh (yellow card) 7'; Lichnovsky (yellow card) 66'; Al-Ammar 74', 90+6'; Martins 78'; Diop (yellow card) 82'; Al-Hamdan (yellow card) 90+5'	Stadium: Prince Abdullah bin Jalawi Stadium; Attendance: 0 Referee: Faisal Al-Blwi

23 November 2020 5	Al-Ahli	2–2	Al-Shabab	Jeddah
18:15	Hassoun 2'; Marin 50'	Report	Guanca 44'; Al-Sqoor 48'	Stadium: King Abdullah Sports City; Attendance: 0 Referee: Mohammed Al-Hoaish

27 November 2020 6	Al-Shabab	2–1	Damac	Riyadh
17:40	Al-Abed 41', (yellow card) 43'; Al-Shamekh (yellow card) 45+4'; Al-Ammar 80'	Report	Harzan (yellow card) 7'; Chenihi 33'; Chafaï (yellow card) 42'	Stadium: Prince Khalid bin Sultan Stadium; Attendance: 0 Referee: Raed Al-Zahrani

6 December 2020 7	Al-Qadsiah	2–1	Al-Shabab	Khobar
17:25	Asprilla 41'; Edson (yellow card) 58'; Andria 66'	Report	Diop 20'; Al-Abed (yellow card) 90+3'	Stadium: Prince Saud bin Jalawi Stadium; Attendance: 0 Referee: Majed Al-Shamrani

11 December 2020 8	Al-Shabab	1–1	Al-Ittihad	Riyadh
19:45	Lichnovsky 57'; Salem (yellow card) 59'; Banega (yellow card) 78'	Report	Prijović 19'; Al-Bishi (yellow card) 51'; Hegazi (yellow card) 59'; Al-Malki (yellow card) 62'; El Ahmadi (yellow card) 76'	Stadium: Prince Khalid bin Sultan Stadium; Attendance: 0 Referee: Mohammed Al-Hoaish

21 December 2020 9	Al-Taawoun	4–0	Al-Shabab	Buraidah
17:55	Tawamba (yellow card) 14', (goal) 75' (pen.); Santos 41'; Al-Sobhi (yellow card) 55'; Sandro 65'; Al-Abdulmenem 90+4'	Report	Bajandouh (yellow card) 39'; Banega (yellow card) 49'; Sharahili (yellow card) 64'; Al-Dubaysh (yellow card) 90'	Stadium: King Abdullah Sport City Stadium; Attendance: 0 Referee: Faisal Al-Blwi

26 December 2020 10	Al-Shabab	3–1	Al-Batin	Riyadh
15:15	Banega (yellow card) 12'; Martins 18'; Al-Abed 48'; Guanca 78'	Report	Abreu 71'	Stadium: Prince Khalid bin Sultan Stadium; Attendance: 0 Referee: Turki Al-Khudhayr

31 December 2020 11	Al-Hilal	1–1	Al-Shabab	Riyadh
19:50	Al-Faraj (yellow card) 30'; Cuéllar (yellow card) 32'; Al-Shehri 87'	Report	Martins 14'; Al-Ammar (yellow card) 21' (yellow-red card) 51'; Al-Hamdan (yellow card) 35'; Al-Zori (yellow card) 68'; Salem (yellow card) 80'	Stadium: King Fahd International Stadium; Attendance: 0 Referee: Khaled Al-Teris

9 January 2021 12	Al-Shabab	1–0	Al-Ettifaq	Riyadh
17:55	Guanca 22', (yellow card) 90+2'; Bajandouh (yellow card) 64'; Salem (yellow card) 66'; Al-Qahtani (yellow card) 90+3'; Al-Bawardi (yellow card) 90+3'; Diop (yellow card) 90+4'	Report	Ghazi (yellow card) 25'; Kiss (yellow card) 70'	Stadium: Prince Khalid bin Sultan Stadium; Attendance: 0 Referee: Mohammed Al-Hoaish

14 January 2021 13	Al-Ain	0–3	Al-Shabab	Al Bahah
15:55	Al-Qeshtah (yellow card) 39'	Report	Guanca 60', 90+4', (yellow card) 62'; Al-Hamdan 81'	Stadium: King Saud Sport City Stadium; Attendance: 0 Referee: Sultan Al-Harbi

19 January 2021 14	Al-Shabab	1–1	Al-Faisaly	Riyadh
18:10	Martins 34', (yellow card) 58'	Report	Ashraf 7'; M. Qassem (yellow card) 44'; Rossi (yellow card) 61'; Silva (yellow card) 90'	Stadium: Prince Khalid bin Sultan Stadium; Attendance: 0 Referee: Ahmad Al-Rumaikhani

25 January 2021 15	Al-Wehda	2–4	Al-Shabab	Mecca
18:45	Anselmo 20'; Al-Ghamdi (yellow card) 35', (goal) 37'; Al-Hafith (yellow card) 65'; Bakshween (yellow card) 69'	Report	Bajandouh (yellow card) 4'; Al-Hamdan (yellow card) 31', (goal) 80'; Sebá 43', 76'; Al-Zori 55'	Stadium: King Abdul Aziz Stadium; Attendance: 0 Referee: Faisal Al-Blwi

30 January 2021 16	Abha	2–3	Al-Shabab	Abha
16:00	Bguir 62'; Al-Amri 71'; Al-Jumeiah (yellow card) 86'	Report	Lichnovsky 55'; Guanca 57'; Sebá 69'; Al-Zori (yellow card) 84'	Stadium: Prince Sultan bin Abdul Aziz Stadium; Attendance: 0 Referee: Turki Al-Khudhayr

6 February 2021 17	Al-Shabab	4–1	Al-Raed	Riyadh
18:20	Banega 18' (pen.); Guanca 25', 73'; Sharahili (yellow card) 39'; Salem (yellow card) 45+1'; Martins 45+2'	Report	El Berkaoui 48'	Stadium: Prince Khalid bin Sultan Stadium; Attendance: 0 Referee: Shukri Al-Hanfoush

13 February 2021 18	Al-Nassr	0–4	Al-Shabab	Riyadh
20:20	Martínez (yellow card) 22'; Hamdallah (yellow card) 33'; Petros (yellow card) 35'; Amrabat (yellow card) 73'	Report	Banega 17' (pen.); Guanca 28', 82'; Martins (yellow card) 42'; Al-Qahtani (yellow card) 72'; Al-Bawardi (yellow card) 79'; Tambakti (yellow card) 88'; N'Diaye (yellow card) 90'; Ighalo 90+2'	Stadium: Mrsool Park; Attendance: 0 Referee: Turki Al-Khudhayr

17 February 2021 19	Al-Shabab	1–2	Al-Fateh	Riyadh
18:25	Guanca 43'; Al-Abed (yellow card) 81'	Report	Cueva 67' te Vrede 90+3'	Stadium: Prince Khalid bin Sultan Stadium; Attendance: 0 Referee: Mohammed Al-Nuhait

22 February 2021 20	Al-Shabab	3–0	Al-Ahli	Riyadh
20:35	Sharahili 12'; Salem (yellow card) 45+2'; N'Diaye 70'; Banega (yellow card) 88'; Guanca 90+5'	Report	Lima (yellow card) 69'; Hawsawi (yellow card) 69'	Stadium: Prince Khalid bin Sultan Stadium; Attendance: 0 Referee: Majed Al-Shamrani

1 March 2021 21	Damac	1–2	Al-Shabab	Abha
16:05	Zelaya 20'	Report	Ighalo 12', 39'; Al-Qahtani (yellow card) 14'; Martins (yellow card) 72'; Al-Bawardi (yellow card) 85'; Lichnovsky (red card) 90'	Stadium: Prince Sultan bin Abdul Aziz Stadium; Attendance: 0 Referee: Turki Al-Khudhayr

5 March 2021 22	Al-Shabab	1–1	Al-Qadsiah	Riyadh
18:35	Banega (yellow card) 35'; Al-Ammar 90+1'	Report	Al-Nattar (yellow card) 16'; Edson (yellow card) 33'; Stanley 45'; Asprilla (yellow card) 59'; Al-Dawsari (yellow card) 83'; Al-Safri (yellow card) 85'	Stadium: Prince Khalid bin Sultan Stadium; Attendance: 0 Referee: Mohammed Al-Qarni

10 March 2021 23	Al-Ittihad	2–1	Al-Shabab	Mecca
20:45	Al-Aboud 12'; El Ahmadi (yellow card) 29'; Al-Sahafi (yellow card) 40'; Al-Malki (yellow card) 74'; Al-Muwallad 82' (pen.)	Report	Martins (yellow card) 9'; Banega (yellow card) 22'; Sebá 43'; Lichnovsky (yellow card) 80'; Al-Abed (yellow card) 84'; Guanca (yellow card) 86'; Al-Sqoor (yellow card) 87'	Stadium: King Abdul Aziz Stadium; Attendance: 0 Referee: Khaled Salwi

20 March 2021 24	Al-Shabab	1–3	Al-Taawoun	Riyadh
18:40	Sebá 90+1'	Report	Kaku 29'; Al-Ghamdi (yellow card) 40'; Assiri 42'; Abousaban (yellow card) 53'; Al-Zubaidi (yellow card) 61'; Tawamba 67'; Al-Mousa (yellow card) 77'	Stadium: Prince Khalid bin Sultan Stadium; Attendance: 0 Referee: Majed Al-Shamrani

10 April 2021 25	Al-Batin	1–4	Al-Shabab	Hafar al-Batin
18:55	Rayhi 28'; Al-Shammeri (yellow card) 48'	Report	Banega 7' (pen.), 45'; Martins (yellow card) 37'; Guanca 41', 49'; Al-Sqoor (yellow card) 84'; Al-Qahtani (red card) 90+3'	Stadium: Al-Batin Club Stadium; Attendance: 0 Referee: Alexis Herrera (Venezuela)

17 April 2021 26	Al-Shabab	1–5	Al-Hilal	Riyadh
21:45	Martins 5'; Banega (yellow card) 18' (yellow-red card) 45+1'; Tambakti (yellow card) 24'; Salem (yellow card) 45+1'; Guanca (yellow card) 70'; N'Diaye (yellow card) 74'	Report	Gomis 3', 25' (pen.); Vietto 45+3'; N. Al-Dawsari 66', (yellow card) 90'; Kanno 84'; Al-Shehri (yellow card) 90'	Stadium: Prince Khalid bin Sultan Stadium; Attendance: 0 Referee: István Kovács (Romania)

14 May 2021 27	Al-Ettifaq	4–3	Al-Shabab	Dammam
18:50	Hawsawi (yellow card) 20'; Azaro 40', 68'; Doukara 48', (yellow card) 61'; Hazazi (yellow card) 54'; Al-Kwikbi 83'	Report	Ighalo 11', 22' (pen.); Martins 75'; Al-Abed (yellow card) 81'	Stadium: Prince Mohamed bin Fahd Stadium; Attendance: 0 Referee: Szymon Marciniak (Poland)

19 May 2021 28	Al-Shabab	5–1	Al-Ain	Riyadh
19:10	Sebá 36'; Ighalo 41'; N'Diaye (yellow card) 43'; Banega 67' (pen.); Guanca 72'; Lichnovsky 83'	Report	Ndiaye 45'; Fouad (yellow card) 81'	Stadium: Prince Khalid bin Sultan Stadium; Attendance: 1,085; Referee: Sami Al-Jires

23 May 2021 29	Al-Faisaly	1–5	Al-Shabab	Al Majma'ah
21:00	Faik 23'; Silva (yellow card) 57'; Al-Saiari (yellow card) 88'	Report	Salem (yellow card) 31'; Al-Harbi 43'; Sebá 59'; Guanca 79'; Martins 90'; Ighalo 90+5'	Stadium: Al Majma'ah Sports City; Attendance: 696; Referee: Jean-Jacques Ndala (DR Congo)

30 May 2021 30	Al-Shabab	3–0	Al-Wehda	Riyadh
21:00	Martins 7'; Lichnovsky (yellow card) 45+3'; Ighalo 54', 90'	Report	Al-Hafith (yellow card) 31'; Niakaté (yellow card) 39'; Bakshween (yellow card) 57'	Stadium: Prince Khalid bin Sultan Stadium; Attendance: 883; Referee: Majed Al-Shammari

=== King Cup ===
All times are local, AST (UTC+3).

16 December 2020 Round of 16	Al-Qadsiah	1–0	Al-Shabab	Khobar
17:25	Bordeianu (yellow card) 67'; Al-Amri 89' (pen.), (yellow card) 90'; Al-Yami (yellow card) 90+1'	Report	Martins (yellow card) 45'; Al-Hamdan (yellow card) 80'; Al-Dubaysh (yellow card) 82'; Guanca (yellow card) 89'	Stadium: Prince Saud bin Jalawi Stadium; Attendance: 0 Referee: Sultan Al-Harbi

=== Arab Club Champions Cup ===
==== Semi-finals ====
2 December 2020 First leg	Al-Shabab (Saudi Arabia)	2–2	(Saudi Arabia) Al-Ittihad	Riyadh, Saudi Arabia
19:45 AST	Lichnovsky (yellow card) 40', (goal) 79'; Guanca 49'	Report	Hegazi (yellow card) 3'; Romarinho 11'; Al-Malki (yellow card) 72'; Rodrigues 82'	Stadium: Prince Khalid bin Sultan Stadium; Attendance: 0 Referee: Ahmed Al-Kaf (Oman)

4 January 2021 Second leg	Al-Ittihad (Saudi Arabia)	2–1	(Saudi Arabia) Al-Shabab	Mecca, Saudi Arabia
20:00 AST	Abdulhamid (yellow card) 30'; Hegazi (yellow card) 57'; Romarinho 74'; Prijović 90+2'	Report	Martins 1', (yellow card) 64'; Banega (yellow card) 59'; Lichnovsky (yellow card) 86'; Salem (yellow card) 90'	Stadium: King Abdul Aziz Stadium; Attendance: 0 Referee: Majed Al-Shamrani (Saudi Arabia)

== Statistics ==
=== Appearances ===
Last updated on 30 May 2021.

No.	Pos	Nat	Player	Total		Pro League		King Cup		Arab Club Champions Cup	
No.	Pos	Nat	Player	Apps	Goals	Apps	Goals	Apps	Goals	Apps	Goals
Goalkeepers
23	GK	(Saudi Arabia) KSA	Marwan Al-Haidari	0	0	0	0	0	0	0	0
33	GK	(Saudi Arabia) KSA	Zaid Al-Bawardi	24	0	22	0	0+1	0	1	0
50	GK	(Saudi Arabia) KSA	Mohammed Al-Dossari	0	0	0	0	0	0	0	0
Defenders
2	DF	(Chile) CHI	Igor Lichnovsky	28	4	26	3	0	0	2	1
3	DF	(Saudi Arabia) KSA	Khalid Al-Ghamdi	2	0	2	0	0	0	0	0
4	DF	(Saudi Arabia) KSA	Abdullah Al-Zori	22	1	18+4	1	0	0	0	0
5	DF	(Saudi Arabia) KSA	Hassan Tambakti	14	0	7+6	0	1	0	0	0
12	DF	(Saudi Arabia) KSA	Mohammed Salem	22	0	21	0	0	0	1	0
13	DF	(Saudi Arabia) KSA	Khalid Al-Dubaysh	3	0	1+1	0	1	0	0	0
17	DF	(Saudi Arabia) KSA	Abdullah Al-Shamekh	9	0	6+2	0	0	0	1	0
20	DF	(Saudi Arabia) KSA	Ahmed Sharahili	25	2	22+1	2	0	0	2	0
24	DF	(Saudi Arabia) KSA	Moteb Al-Harbi	21	1	8+10	1	1	0	1+1	0
27	DF	(Saudi Arabia) KSA	Fawaz Al-Sqoor	24	1	14+8	1	1	0	1	0
Midfielders
6	MF	(Saudi Arabia) KSA	Abdulmalek Al-Khaibri	1	0	0+1	0	0	0	0	0
7	MF	(Saudi Arabia) KSA	Turki Al-Ammar	28	4	7+19	4	0	0	2	0
8	MF	(Argentina) ARG	Cristian Guanca	30	18	25+3	17	1	0	1	1
10	MF	(Argentina) ARG	Éver Banega	30	7	27	7	1	0	2	0
11	MF	(Portugal) POR	Fábio Martins	28	10	25+1	9	1	0	1	1
14	MF	(Saudi Arabia) KSA	Nawaf Al-Abed	22	2	5+15	2	0	0	2	0
15	MF	(Saudi Arabia) KSA	Hussain Al-Qahtani	27	0	14+11	0	0	0	0+2	0
19	MF	(Saudi Arabia) KSA	Jamal Bajandouh	11	0	5+6	0	0	0	0	0
21	MF	(Saudi Arabia) KSA	Nasser Al-Omran	11	0	0+10	0	0+1	0	0	0
26	MF	(Saudi Arabia) KSA	Hamad Al-Ghamdi	0	0	0	0	0	0	0	0
38	MF	(Saudi Arabia) KSA	Ammar Al-Najjar	4	0	0+4	0	0	0	0	0
81	MF	(Senegal) SEN	Alfred N'Diaye	29	1	26	1	1	0	2	0
92	MF	(Brazil) BRA	Sebá	16	7	15+1	7	0	0	0	0
Forwards
47	FW	(Saudi Arabia) KSA	Fares Al-Garzae	0	0	0	0	0	0	0	0
89	FW	(Nigeria) NGA	Odion Ighalo	13	9	10+3	9	0	0	0	0
Players sent out on loan this season
28	DF	(Saudi Arabia) KSA	Ali Majrashi	6	0	0+5	0	1	0	0	0
Player who made an appearance this season but have left the club
1	GK	(Lithuania) LTU	Giedrius Arlauskis	10	0	8	0	1	0	1	0
9	FW	(Saudi Arabia) KSA	Abdullah Al-Hamdan	19	2	9+7	2	0+1	0	1+1	0
18	MF	(Saudi Arabia) KSA	Waleed Al-Enezi	0	0	0	0	0	0	0	0
99	FW	(Senegal) SEN	Makhete Diop	14	2	7+5	2	1	0	1	0

=== Goalscorers ===
Rank	No.	Pos	Nat	Name	Pro League	King Cup	Arab Club Champions Cup	Total
1	8	MF	(Argentina)	Cristian Guanca	17	0	1	18
2	11	MF	(Portugal)	Fábio Martins	9	0	1	10
3	89	FW	(Nigeria)	Odion Ighalo	9	0	0	9
4	10	MF	(Argentina)	Éver Banega	7	0	0	7
4	92	MF	(Brazil)	Sebá	7	0	0	7
6	2	DF	(Chile)	Igor Lichnovsky	3	0	1	4
6	7	MF	(Saudi Arabia)	Turki Al-Ammar	4	0	0	4
8	9	FW	(Saudi Arabia)	Abdullah Al-Hamdan	2	0	0	2
8	14	MF	(Saudi Arabia)	Nawaf Al-Abed	2	0	0	2
8	20	DF	(Saudi Arabia)	Ahmed Sharahili	2	0	0	2
8	99	FW	(Senegal)	Makhete Diop	2	0	0	2
12	4	DF	(Saudi Arabia)	Abdullah Al-Zori	1	0	0	1
12	24	DF	(Saudi Arabia)	Moteb Al-Harbi	1	0	0	1
12	27	DF	(Saudi Arabia)	Fawaz Al-Sqoor	1	0	0	1
12	81	MF	(Senegal)	Alfred N'Diaye	1	0	0	1
Own goal					0	0	0	0
Total					68	0	3	71

Last Updated: 30 May 2021

=== Assists ===
Rank	No.	Pos	Nat	Name	Pro League	King Cup	Arab Club Champions Cup	Total
1	10	MF	(Argentina)	Éver Banega	11	0	0	11
2	9	FW	(Saudi Arabia)	Abdullah Al-Hamdan	8	0	1	9
3	8	MF	(Argentina)	Cristian Guanca	5	0	0	5
4	4	DF	(Saudi Arabia)	Abdullah Al-Zori	4	0	0	4
4	11	MF	(Portugal)	Fábio Martins	4	0	0	4
4	27	DF	(Saudi Arabia)	Fawaz Al-Sqoor	4	0	0	4
4	92	MF	(Brazil)	Sebá	4	0	0	4
8	89	FW	(Nigeria)	Odion Ighalo	3	0	0	3
9	7	MF	(Saudi Arabia)	Turki Al-Ammar	1	0	1	2
9	14	MF	(Saudi Arabia)	Nawaf Al-Abed	2	0	0	2
9	20	DF	(Saudi Arabia)	Ahmed Sharahili	2	0	0	2
9	99	FW	(Senegal)	Makhete Diop	2	0	0	2
13	2	DF	(Chile)	Igor Lichnovsky	1	0	0	1
13	3	DF	(Saudi Arabia)	Khalid Al-Ghamdi	1	0	0	1
13	5	DF	(Saudi Arabia)	Hassan Tambakti	1	0	0	1
13	12	DF	(Saudi Arabia)	Mohammed Salem	1	0	0	1
13	15	MF	(Saudi Arabia)	Hussain Al-Qahtani	1	0	0	1
13	17	DF	(Saudi Arabia)	Abdullah Al-Shamekh	1	0	0	1
13	81	MF	(Senegal)	Alfred N'Diaye	0	0	1	1
Total					56	0	3	59

Last Updated: 30 May 2021

=== Clean sheets ===
Rank	No.	Pos	Nat	Name	Pro League	King Cup	Arab Club Champions Cup	Total
1	33	GK	(Saudi Arabia)	Zaid Al-Bawardi	5	0	0	5
2	1	GK	(Lithuania)	Giedrius Arlauskis	1	0	0	1
Total					6	0	0	6

Last Updated: 30 May 2021
