= Waleed Al-Enezi =

Saudi Arabian footballer

Personal information
- Full name: Waleed Hizam Al-Enezi
- Date of birth: 19 December 1994 (age 31)
- Place of birth: Rafha, Saudi Arabia
- Height: 1.69 m (5 ft 6 1/2 in)
- Position: Midfielder

Team information
- Current team: Al-Kawkab
- Number: 8

Youth career
- –2013: Al-Tadamon
- 2013–2016: Al-Shabab

Senior career*
Years	Team	Apps	(Gls)
2016–2021	Al-Shabab	20	(0)
2016–2017	→ Al-Batin (loan)	25	(1)
2018	→ Al-Batin (loan)	1	(0)
2021–2023	Damac	41	(0)
2023–2024	Al-Jandal	10	(0)
2025–	Al-Kawkab		

International career
2013–2014	Saudi Arabia U23		
- * Club domestic league appearances and goals as of 27 June 2022

Waleed Hizam Al-Enezi (Arabic: وَلِيد حَزَّام الْعَنْزِيّ; born 19 December 1994) is a Saudi Arabian professional footballer who plays as a midfielder for Al-Kawkab.

== Club career ==
Al-Enezi began his career at hometown club Al-Tadamon. On 16 April 2013, Al-Enezi joined the youth team of Al-Shabab. On 17 July 2016, Al-Enezi joined Batin on loan until the end of the 2016–17 season. On 20 January 2018, Al-Enezi once again joined Al-Batin on loan until the end of the 2017–18 season. On 5 February 2021, Al-Enezi was released from his contract by Al-Shabab. On 7 February 2021, Al-Enezi joined Damac. On 16 December 2021, Al-Enezi renewed his contract with Damac for two years. On 19 September 2023, Al-Enezi joined Al-Jandal. On 29 July 2025, Al-Enezi joined Al-Kawkab.

== Career statistics ==
=== Club ===
As of 27 June 2022

Club	Season	League		King Cup		Asia		Other		Total	
Club	Season	Apps	Goals	Apps	Goals	Apps	Goals	Apps	Goals	Apps	Goals
Al-Batin (loan)	2016–17	25	1	1	0	—		5 (Note: Three appearances and one goal in Crown Prince Cup, two appearances in Pro League relegation play-offs)	1	31	2
Al-Shabab	2017–18	5	0	0	0	—		1 (Note: Appearances in Crown Prince Cup)	0	6	0
Al-Shabab	2018–19	12	0	3	0	—		—		15	0
Al-Shabab	2019–20	3	0	0	0	—		0	0	3	0
Al-Shabab	2020–21	0	0	0	0	—		0	0	0	0
Al-Shabab	Total	20	0	3	0	0	0	1	0	24	0
Al-Batin (loan)	2017–18	1	0	1	0	—		0	0	2	0
Damac	2020–21	8	0	0	0	—		—		8	0
Damac	2021–22	28	0	1	0	—		—		29	0
Damac	Total	36	0	1	0	0	0	0	0	37	0
Career totals		82	1	6	0	0	0	6	1	94	2
