= Abdullah Al-Hamdan =

Saudi Arabian footballer

Personal information
- Full name: Abdullah Abdulrahman Al-Hamdan
- Date of birth: 13 September 1999 (age 27)
- Place of birth: Riyadh, Saudi Arabia
- Height: 1.84 m (6 ft 0 in)
- Position: Forward

Team information
- Current team: Al-Nassr
- Number: 9

Youth career
- 2013–2018: Al-Shabab
- 2018: → Sporting Gijón (loan)

Senior career*
Years	Team	Apps	(Gls)
2018–2021	Al-Shabab	44	(5)
2021–2026	Al-Hilal	90	(7)
2026–	Al-Nassr	27	(6)

International career^{‡}
2017–2019	Saudi Arabia U20	14	(6)
2019–2022	Saudi Arabia U23	22	(6)
2019–	Saudi Arabia	62	(14)
- * Club domestic league appearances and goals as of 20 November 2026 ‡ National team caps and goals as of 18:56, 17 November 2026 (UTC)

Abdullah Abdulrahman Al-Hamdan (Arabic: عَبْد الله عَبْد الرَّحْمٰن الْحَمْدَان; born 13 September 1999) is a Saudi Arabian football player who plays as a forward for Saudi Pro League club Al-Nassr and the Saudi Arabia national team.

He is the son of former Al-Shabab goalkeeper and former Hetten manager, Abdulrahman Al-Hamdan. Al-Hamdan studied at Riyadh Schools and joined the Al-Shabab academy at an early age, where he developed his talent to become one of the top rising Saudi talents. After a period with Al-Hilal, he officially moved to Al-Nassr on 2 February 2026.

== Club career ==
Al-Hamdan is an academy graduate of Al-Shabab. In 2018, as part of a deal between the Saudi Arabian Football Federation and La Liga, Al-Hamdan joined Spanish club Sporting Gijón's U19 squad on a six-month loan. He returned to Al-Shabab following the conclusion of the 2017–18 season.

On 2 January 2019, Al-Hamdan made his debut with the first team in the King Cup match against Al-Sahel coming off the bench in the 61st minute to replace Khalid Kaabi. Al-Hamdan made his league debut in the match against Al-Wehda on 15 February 2019. He made his first start for the club in the final match of the 2018–19 season against Al-Hilal. On 23 September 2019, Al-Hamdan scored his first goal for the club in the Arab Club Champions Cup match against Algerian club JS Saoura, he also assisted Danilo Asprilla's goal to put Al-Shabab 3–1 ahead. Four days later, Al-Hamdan scored his first league goal in the 2–1 loss against Al-Ittihad. He ended his second season at the club scoring 5 goals in 22 appearances in all competitions.

On 7 November 2020, Al-Hamdan came off the bench in the 94th minute and assisted Turki Al-Ammar's third goal in the 3–1 away win against Al-Fateh. On 23 November 2020, Al-Hamdan made his first start of the season and assisted Cristian Guanca's equalizer in the 2–2 draw against Al-Ahli. On 27 November 2020, Al-Hamdan came off the bench and assisted Turki Al-Ammar's winner in the 2–1 win against Damac. On 2 December 2020, he assisted Cristian Guanca's equalizer in the 2–2 draw against Al-Ittihad in the first leg of the Arab Club Champions Cup semi-finals. On 26 December 2020, Al-Hamdan started the league match against Al-Batin and assisted two goals.

On 14 January 2021, Al-Hamdan scored his first goal of the season in the 3–0 away win against Al-Ain, he also assisted Cristian Guanca's opener. On 19 January 2021, he assisted Fábio Martins's equalizer in the 1–1 draw against Al-Faisaly. On 25 January 2021, Al-Hamdan scored once and assisted once in the 4–2 away win against Al-Wehda. On 6 February 2021, Al-Hamdan made his final appearance for Al-Shabab in the 4–1 home win against Al-Raed. He left the pitch in tears while being replaced by Odion Ighalo in the 84th minute. He made 51 appearances for Al-Shabab in all competitions and scored 7 goals and recorded 12 assists. On 6 February 2021, Al-Hamdan joined Al-Hilal on a five-year contract for a reported fee of SAR3 million.

On 3 February 2026, Al-Hamdan joined Al-Nassr on a free transfer.

== International career ==
Al-Hamdan made his debut for the Saudi national team in a friendly against Mali on 5 September 2019. A month later, on 10 October, he scored his first international goal in a 3–0 victory over Singapore during the 2022 FIFA World Cup qualification.

On 28 December 2024, he scored his first brace for his country in a 3–1 victory over Iraq in the 26th Arabian Gulf Cup, qualifying his nation to the semi-finals of the competition.

On 31 May 2026, he was named in the 26-man squad for the 2026 FIFA World Cup.

== Career statistics ==
=== Club ===
As of match played 2 November 2026

Club	Season	League			King Cup		Asia		Other		Total	
Club	Season	Division	Apps	Goals	Apps	Goals	Apps	Goals	Apps	Goals	Apps	Goals
Al-Shabab	2018–19	SPL	9	0	1	0	—		—		10	0
Al-Shabab	2019–20	SPL	19	3	0	0	—		3 (Note: Appearances in Arab Club Champions Cup)	2	22	5
Al-Shabab	2020–21	SPL	16	2	1	0	—		2	0	19	2
Al-Shabab	Total		44	5	2	0	0	0	5	2	51	7
Al-Hilal	2020–21	SPL	8	1	0	0	1 (Note: Appearances in AFC Champions League)	0	—		9	1
Al-Hilal	2021–22	SPL	16	0	3	0	8	1	1 (Note: Appearance in Saudi Super Cup)	0	28	1
Al-Hilal	2022–23	SPL	18	1	2	0	4	0	3 (Note: One appearance in Saudi Super Cup, and two appearances in FIFA Club World Cup)	0	27	1
Al-Hilal	2023–24	SPL	21	3	3	0	10	1	8 (Note: Six appearances and one goal in Arab Club Champions Cup, and two appearances in Saudi Super Cup)	1	42	5
Al-Hilal	2024–25	SPL	17	2	3	2	9	1	1	0	30	5
Al-Hilal	2025–26	SPL	10	0	2	1	3	0	—		15	1
Al-Hilal	Total		90	7	13	3	35	3	13	1	151	14
Al-Nassr	2025–26	SPL	15	3	0	0	5 (Note: Appearances in AFC Champions League Two)	2	—		20	5
Al-Nassr	2026–27	SPL	11	3	1	1	3	1	0	0	15	5
Al-Nassr	Total		26	6	1	1	8	3	0	0	35	10
Career total			160	18	16	4	43	6	18	3	237	31

=== International ===
Scores and results list Saudi Arabia's goal tally first.

Goal	Date	Venue	Opponent	Score	Result	Competition
1.	10 October 2019	King Abdullah Sports City Stadium, Jeddah, Saudi Arabia	Singapore	2–0	3–0	2022 FIFA World Cup qualification
2.	30 November 2019	Abdullah bin Khalifa Stadium, Doha, Qatar	Bahrain	1–0	2–0	24th Arabian Gulf Cup
3.	5 December 2019	Al Janoub Stadium, Al Wakrah, Qatar	Qatar	1–0	1–0	24th Arabian Gulf Cup
4.	17 November 2020	Prince Faisal bin Fahd Stadium, Riyadh, Saudi Arabia	Jamaica	1–0	1–2	Friendly
5.	4 December 2021	Education City Stadium, Al Rayyan, Qatar	Palestine	1–1	1–1	2021 FIFA Arab Cup
6.	17 December 2024	Al-Shabab Club Stadium, Riyadh, Saudi Arabia	Trinidad and Tobago	2–0	3–1	Friendly
7.	25 December 2024	Sulaibikhat Stadium, Sulaibikhat, Kuwait	Yemen	3–2	3–2	26th Arabian Gulf Cup
8.	28 December 2024	Jaber Al-Ahmad International Stadium, Kuwait City, Kuwait	Iraq	2–1	3–1	26th Arabian Gulf Cup
9.	28 December 2024	Jaber Al-Ahmad International Stadium, Kuwait City, Kuwait	Iraq	3–1	3–1	26th Arabian Gulf Cup
10.	4 September 2025	FK Viktoria Stadion, Prague, Czech Republic	North Macedonia	2–1	2–1	Friendly
11.	8 September 2025	Malšovická aréna, Hradec Králové, Czech Republic	Czech Republic	1–1	1–1	Friendly
12.	31 March 2026	TSC Arena, Bačka Topola, Serbia	Serbia	1–0	1–2	Friendly
13.	5 June 2026	Q2 Stadium, Austin, United States	Puerto Rico	2–0	3–0	Friendly
14.	29 September 2026	King Abdullah Sports City Stadium, Jeddah, Saudi Arabia	Iraq	2–0	2–0	27th Arabian Gulf Cup

== Honours ==
Al-Hilal

- Saudi Pro League: 2020–21, 2021–22, 2023–24
- AFC Champions League: 2021
- King's Cup: 2022–23, 2023–24
- Saudi Super Cup: 2021, 2023, 2024

Al-Nassr

- Saudi Pro League: 2025–26

Saudi Arabia U20

- AFC U-19 Championship: 2018

Individual

- Saudi Pro League Young Player of the Month: January 2021
