= Zaid Al-Bawardi =

Saudi Arabian association football player

Personal information
- Full name: Zaid Majed Al-Bawardi
- Date of birth: 26 January 1997 (age 29)
- Place of birth: Riyadh, Saudi Arabia
- Height: 1.91 m (6 ft 3 in)
- Position: Goalkeeper

Youth career
- –2018: Al-Nassr

Senior career*
Years	Team	Apps	(Gls)
2018–2020	Al-Nassr	2	(0)
2020–2023	Al-Shabab	23	(0)
2023–2024	Al-Riyadh	0	(0)

International career^{‡}
2015–2017	Saudi Arabia U-20		
2018–2021	Saudi Arabia U-23		
2021–	Saudi Arabia	2	(0)
- * Club domestic league appearances and goals as of 30 May 2021 ‡ National team caps and goals as of 7 December 2021

Zaid Majed Al-Bawardi (Arabic: زيد ماجد البواردي, born 26 January 1997) is a Saudi Arabian professional footballer who plays as a goalkeeper.

== Career ==
He was promoted to the first team in the 2018-2019 season and made his debut in the 2019 AFC Champions League against Iranian side Zob Ahan. The match ended in a 0–0 draw.

On 1 October 2020, Al-Bawardi joined Al-Shabab. On 7 August 2023, Al-Bawardi joined Al-Riyadh.

== Club career statistics ==
As of match played 30 May 2021

Club	Season	League			King Cup		Asia		Other		Total	
Club	Season	Division	Apps	Goals	Apps	Goals	Apps	Goals	Apps	Goals	Apps	Goals
Al-Nassr	2018–19	Pro League	0	0	0	0	1	0	—		1	0
Al-Nassr	2019–20	Pro League	2	0	0	0	0	0	—		2	0
Al-Nassr	Al-Nassr Total		2	0	0	0	1	0	0	0	3	0
Al-Shabab	2020–21	Pro League	22	0	1	0	—		1 (Note: Appearances in Arab Club Champions Cup)	0	24	0
Career totals			24	0	1	0	1	0	1	0	27	0

== Honours ==
=== Club ===
Al-Nassr

- Saudi Professional League: 2018–19
- Saudi Super Cup: 2019
