= Nasser Al-Omran =

Saudi Arabian footballer (born 1997)

Nasser Al-Omran ناصر العمران
Personal information
- Full name: Nasser Salman Al-Omran
- Date of birth: 13 February 1997 (age 29)
- Place of birth: Riyadh, Saudi Arabia
- Height: 1.74 m (5 ft 9 in)
- Position: Midfielder

Youth career
- 2013–2018: Al-Shabab

Senior career*
| Years | Team | Apps | (Gls) |
| 2018–2023 | Al-Shabab | 33 | (0) |
| 2023–2025 | Abha | 8 | (0) |

International career
| 2018–2021 | Saudi Arabia U23 | | |
- * Club domestic league appearances and goals as of 9 September 2020

Nasser Al-Omran (Arabic: ناصر العمران; born 13 February 1997) is a Saudi Arabian footballer who plays as a midfielder.

== Career ==
Al-Omran started his career at Al-Shabab at the age 16 in Saudi league under 16 of season 2012/2013 . and is a product of the Al-Shabab's youth system. On 1 March 2018, Al-Omran made his professional debut for Al-Shabab against Al-Ittihad in the Pro League, replacing Turki Al-Ammar. On 2 July 2019, Al-Omran signed a 4-year professional contract with Al-Shabab. On 28 January 2023, Al-Omran joined Abha on a two-and-a-half-year deal.

== Career statistics ==
=== Club ===
As of match played 28 May 2024

| Club | Season | League | | King Cup | | Asia | | Other | | Total | |
| Club | Season | Apps | Goals | Apps | Goals | Apps | Goals | Apps | Goals | Apps | Goals |
|---|---|---|---|---|---|---|---|---|---|---|---|
| Al-Shabab | 2017–18 | 1 | 0 | 0 | 0 | — | | — | | 1 | 0 |
| Al-Shabab | 2018–19 | 1 | 0 | 1 | 0 | — | | — | | 2 | 0 |
| Al-Shabab | 2019–20 | 14 | 0 | 1 | 0 | — | | 4 (Note: Appearances in Arab Club Champions Cup) | 0 | 19 | 0 |
| Al-Shabab | 2020–21 | 10 | 0 | 1 | 0 | — | | 0 | 0 | 11 | 0 |
| Al-Shabab | 2021–22 | 5 | 0 | 1 | 0 | 4 | 0 | — | | 10 | 0 |
| Al-Shabab | 2022–23 | 2 | 0 | 0 | 0 | 0 | 0 | — | | 2 | 0 |
| Al-Shabab | Total | 33 | 0 | 4 | 0 | 4 | 0 | 4 | 0 | 45 | 0 |
| Abha | 2022–23 | 6 | 0 | 1 | 0 | — | | — | | 7 | 0 |
| Abha | 2023–24 | 2 | 0 | 0 | 0 | — | | — | | 2 | 0 |
| Abha | Total | 8 | 0 | 1 | 0 | 0 | 0 | 0 | 0 | 9 | 0 |
| Career totals | | 41 | 0 | 5 | 0 | 4 | 0 | 4 | 0 | 54 | 0 |
