= Marwan Al-Haidari =

Saudi Arabian footballer (born 1996)

Personal information
- Full name: Marwan Abdulaziz Al-Haidari
- Date of birth: 12 April 1996 (age 30)
- Place of birth: Saudi Arabia
- Height: 1.92 m (6 ft 4 in)
- Position: Goalkeeper

Team information
- Current team: Al-Khaleej
- Number: 96

Youth career
- 2012-2015: Al-Nahda

Senior career*
| Years | Team | Apps | (Gls) |
| 2015 | Al-Nahda | | |
| 2015–2019 | Al-Hilal | 0 | (0) |
| 2019–2022 | Al-Shabab | 6 | (0) |
| 2021–2022 | → Al-Fayha (loan) | 0 | (0) |
| 2022– | Al-Khaleej | 19 | (0) |
| 2025 | → Al-Ettifaq (loan) | 0 | (0) |

International career
| 2016–2019 | Saudi Arabia U23 | | |
- * Club domestic league appearances and goals as of 31 January 2025

Marwan Al-Haidari (Arabic: مروان الحيدري; born 12 April 1996) is a Saudi Arabian professional footballer who plays as a goalkeeper for Pro League club Al-Khaleej.

== Career ==
Al-Haidari started his career with Al-Nahda. On 21 November 2015, he signed a four-year contract with Pro League club Al-Hilal. On 2 July 2019, he signed a 4-year contract with Pro League club Al-Shabab. On 30 August 2021, Al-Haidari joined Al-Fayha on loan. On 9 August 2022, he joined Al-Khaleej on a two-year deal following his release from Al-Shabab. On 31 January 2025, Al-Haidari joined Al-Ettifaq on a six-month loan.

== Honours ==
Al-Hilal

- Saudi Professional League: 2016–17, 2017–18
- King Cup: 2017
- Crown Prince Cup: 2015–16

Al-Fayha

- King Cup: 2021–22
