= Cristian Guanca =

Argentine footballer (born 1993)

Personal information
- Full name: Cristian David Guanca
- Date of birth: 26 March 1993 (age 33)
- Place of birth: Don Torcuato, Argentina
- Height: 1.77 m (5 ft 10 in)
- Positions: Left midfielder; forward

Team information
- Current team: Chacarita Juniors

Youth career
- –2010: Chacarita

Senior career*
Years	Team	Apps	(Gls)
2011–2015	Chacarita	92	(10)
2015–2019	Colón	46	(4)
2016–2017	→ Emelec (loan)	43	(21)
2017	→ Kasımpaşa (loan)	12	(2)
2018–2019	→ Al-Ettifaq (loan)	29	(14)
2019–2025	Al-Shabab	122	(53)
2021–2022	→ Al Ain (loan)	25	(8)
2023–2024	→ Al Wahda (loan)	10	(2)
2024	→ Al-Taawoun (loan)	14	(0)
2025–2026	Al-Ula	33	(17)
2026–	Chacarita Juniors	0	(0)
- * Club domestic league appearances and goals as of 15:49, 11 February 2026 (UTC)

Cristian David Guanca (born 26 March 1993) is an Argentinian professional footballer who plays as a left midfielder and a forward for Chacarita Juniors.

== Career ==
On 17 June 2018, Guanca joined Saudi Arabian club Al-Ettifaq on a one-year loan from Colón.

On 3 July 2019, Guanca joined Al-Shabab on a three-year contract. On 9 July 2021, Guanca signed one-year contract extension before joining Emirati side Al Ain on loan. On 24 August 2022, Guanca renewed his contract with Al-Shabab, signing a three-year extension. On 15 July 2023, Guanca joined Al Wahda on loan. On 30 January 2024, Guanca joined Al-Taawoun on a six-month loan.

On 19 July 2025, Guanca joined Saudi First Division League side Al-Ula.

== Career statistics ==
As of match played 9 February 2026

Appearances and goals by club, season and competition
Club	Season	League			National cup (Note: Includes Copa Argentina, Turkish Cup, King Cup, UAE President's Cup)		League cup (Note: Includes UAE League Cup)		Continental		Other		Total	
Club	Season	Division	Apps	Goals	Apps	Goals	Apps	Goals	Apps	Goals	Apps	Goals	Apps	Goals
Chacarita	2010–11	Primera Nacional	7	1	0	0	—		—		—		7	1
Chacarita	2011–12	Primera Nacional	22	1	0	0	—		—		—		22	1
Chacarita	2012–13	B Metro	?	?	3	2	—		—		—		?	?
Chacarita	2013–14	B Metro	?	?	2	0	—		—		—		?	?
Chacarita	Total		92	10	5	2	—		2	0	—		97	12
Colón	2015	Primera División	22	3	1	0	—		—		—		23	3
Colón	2017–18	Primera División	24	1	1	0	—		2 (Note: Appearances in Copa Sudamericana)	0	—		27	1
Colón	Total		46	4	2	0	—		2	0	—		50	4
Emelec (loan)	2006	Ecuadorian Serie A	43	21	—		—		9 (Note: Five appearances and two goals in Copa Libertadores, four appearances in Copa Sudamericana)	2	—		52	23
Kasımpaşa (loan)	2016–17	Süper Lig	12	2	4	1	—		—		—		16	3
Al-Ettifaq (loan)	2018–19	SPL	29	14	3	3	—		—		—		32	17
Al-Shabab	2019–20	SPL	30	11	2	2	—		—		4 (Note: Appearances in Arab Club Champions Cup)	2	36	15
Al-Shabab	2020–21	SPL	28	17	1	0	—		—		1	1	30	18
Al-Shabab	2022–23	SPL	28	13	1	0	—		2 (Note: Appearances in AFC Champions League)	0	3	1	34	14
Al-Shabab	2024–25	SPL	34	12	4	2	—		0	0	0	0	38	14
Al-Shabab	Total		122	53	8	4	—		2	0	8	4	138	61
Al-Ain (loan)	2021–22	UPL	25	8	2	0	7	3	—		—		34	11
Al Wahda (loan)	2023–24	UPL	10	2	0	0	4	3	—		4	1	18	5
Al-Taawoun	2023–24	SPL	14	0	0	0	—		—		—		14	0
Al-Ula	2025–26	FDL	20	8	0	0	—		—		—		20	8
Career total			401	123	24	9	11	6	13	2	12	1	461	141

== Honours ==
Al Ain

- UAE Pro League: 2021–22
- UAE League Cup: 2021–22

Al Wahda

- UAE League Cup: 2023–24

Individual

- Saudi Pro League Player of the Month: August & September 2022, February 2025, March 2025
