= Mohammed Attiyah (footballer, born 1992) =

Saudi Arabian footballer

Personal information
- Full name: Mohammed Attiyah Eisa
- Date of birth: June 15, 1992 (age 34)
- Place of birth: Yanbu, Saudi Arabia
- Height: 1.71 m (5 ft 7 1/2 in)
- Position: Attacking midfielder

Youth career
- Al-Majd

Senior career*
Years	Team	Apps	(Gls)
2012–2013	Najran	2	(0)
2013–2015	Abha	?	(0)
2015–2017	Al-Shoulla	45	(2)
2017–2019	Ohod	37	(2)
2019–2022	Al-Shabab	1	(0)
2020–2021	→ Damac (loan)	14	(0)
2021–2022	→ Al-Tai (loan)	6	(0)
2022–2023	Al-Ain	12	(0)
2023–2024	Al-Houra		
2024–2025	União de Coimbra		
2025–2026	Al-Nojoom		
- * Club domestic league appearances and goals

Mohammed Attiyah (born 15 June 1992) is a Saudi Arabian football player who plays as an attacking midfielder.

== Career ==
Attiyah began his career at the youth teams of hometown club Al-Majd. On 12 July 2012, Attiyah joined Pro League side Najran where he spent one season at. In July 2013, Attiyah joined Abha and spent two seasons at the club before leaving. On 4 September 2015, Attiyah joined Al-Shoulla. On 17 June 2017, Attiyah joined newly promoted Pro League side Ohod. On 3 March 2019, Attiyah signed a pre-contract agreement with Al-Shabab. On July 1, 2019, his contract with Ohod expired, and he formally joined the team. On 26 September 2020, Attiyah joined Damac on loan. On 1 August 2021, Attiyah joined Al-Tai on loan. On 21 August 2022, Attiyah joined Al-Ain on a free transfer. On 19 September 2023, Attiyah joined Al-Houra.
