= Abdullah Al-Sudairy =

Saudi Arabian footballer

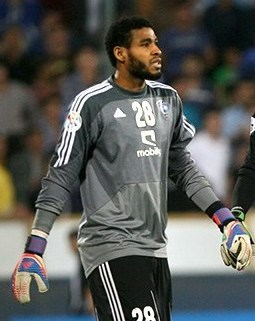

Personal information
- Full name: Abdullah Mohammed Al-Sudairy
- Date of birth: 2 February 1992 (age 34)
- Place of birth: Saudi Arabia
- Height: 1.84 m (6 ft 1/2 in)
- Position: Goalkeeper

Senior career*
Years	Team	Apps	(Gls)
2010–2017	Al-Hilal	45	(0)
2016–2017	→ Al Wehda (loan)	6	(0)
2017–2019	Al-Shabab	2	(0)
2019–2020	Al-Taqadom		

International career^{‡}
2011	Saudi Arabia U20	4	(0)
2013	Saudi Arabia	1	(0)
- * Club domestic league appearances and goals as of 17:03, 5 June 2016 (UTC) ‡ National team caps and goals as of 17:03, 5 June 2016 (UTC)

Abdullah Mohammed Al-Sudairy (Arabic: عبدالله محمد السديري, born 2 February 1992) is a Saudi footballer who plays as a goalkeeper.

== Club career ==
He joined Al-Hilal in 2010 where he made one appearance in that season.
