= Turki Al-Ammar =

Saudi Arabian association football player

Personal information
- Full name: Turki Marwan Saad Al-Ammar
- Date of birth: 24 September 1999 (age 27)
- Place of birth: Riyadh, Saudi Arabia
- Height: 1.71 m (5 ft 7 in)
- Position: Midfielder

Team information
- Current team: Al-Qadsiah
- Number: 7

Senior career*
Years	Team	Apps	(Gls)
2017–2023	Al-Shabab	99	(7)
2023–	Al-Qadsiah	87	(11)

International career^{‡}
2017–2019	Saudi Arabia U20	21	(11)
2019–2022	Saudi Arabia U23	19	(0)
2018–	Saudi Arabia	13	(1)
Medal record
Men's football
Representing Saudi Arabia
AFC U-19 Championship
Winner	2018 Indonesia
- * Club domestic league appearances and goals as of 29 October 2026 ‡ National team caps and goals as of 29 June 2025

Turki Marwan Saad Al-Ammar (Arabic: تركي مروان سعد العمار; born 23 September 1999) is a Saudi Arabian professional footballer. He plays as a midfielder for Al-Qadsiah as well as the Saudi Arabia national team.

== Career ==
=== Club career ===
Al-Ammar made his professional debut for Al-Shabab's youth team on 17 November 2017 in the league match against Al-Ittihad. He came off the bench replacing Abdullah Al-Khaibari in the 84th minute. On 30 November 2017, Al-Ammar made his first start for Al-Shabab in the 2–1 win against Al-Taawoun. He ended his first season at the club making 16 appearances in all competitions. Additionally, Al-Ammar won the "Young Player of the Season" award for the 2017–18 season.

Al-Ammar missed the beginning of the 2018–19 season due to the 2018 AFC U-19 Championship. He made his return on 23 November 2018 in the league match against Al-Nassr.

On 28 January 2019, Al-Ammar signed his first professional contract with the club. He was ruled out until the end of the season due to injury on 25 February 2019. On 5 March 2020, Al-Ammar scored his first goal for Al-Shabab, in the 4–0 win against Al-Adalah.

On 29 August 2023, Al-Ammar joined Saudi First Division League side Al-Qadsiah on a three-year deal.

=== International career ===
He was named on the final list of the Saudi Arabia U19, participating in the 2018 AFC U-19 Championship held in Indonesia. Al-Ammar scored four goals during the tournament, resulting in him being named as the best player of the competition. He was later included as "Young Player of the Year" by the Asian Football Confederation, the first Saudi to ever achieve this honor.

His performance at the 2018 U-19 Asian Cup led to Al-Ammar playing for Saudi team in friendlies against Jordan and South Korea. and Jordan. He was later omitted from the squad for the 2019 AFC Asian Cup.

Al-Ammar finally made his debut for the senior team in the friendly match against Paraguay at home, coming on as substitute for Yahya Al-Shehri during the second half. He was also included in the final squad of the 24th Arabian Gulf Cup, under coach Hervé Renard. After the disastrous 1–3 loss to Kuwait, he was benched.

== Career statistics ==
=== Club ===
As of match played 28 May 2024

Club	Season	League		King Cup		Asia		Other		Total	
Club	Season	Apps	Goals	Apps	Goals	Apps	Goals	Apps	Goals	Apps	Goals
Al-Shabab	2017–18	14	0	2	0	—		—		16	0
Al-Shabab	2018–19	3	0	1	0	—		—		4	0
Al-Shabab	2019–20	16	1	0	0	—		4 (Note: Appearances in Arab Club Champions Cup)	0	20	1
Al-Shabab	2020–21	26	4	0	0	—		2	0	28	4
Al-Shabab	2021–22	22	2	2	1	3	2	—		27	5
Al-Shabab	2022–23	15	0	1	0	2	0	2	0	20	0
Al-Shabab	2023–24	3	0	0	0	—		5	0	8	0
Al-Shabab	Total	99	7	6	1	5	2	13	0	123	10
Al-Qadsiah	2023–24	27	4	1	0	—		—		28	4
Career totals		126	11	7	1	5	2	13	0	151	14

=== International ===
==== International goals ====
Scores and results list Saudi Arabia's goal tally first.

No.	Date	Venue	Opponent	Score	Result	Competition
1.	12 January 2023	Al-Minaa Olympic Stadium, Basra, Iraq	Oman	1–1	1–2	25th Arabian Gulf Cup

== Honours ==
Al-Qadsiah

- Saudi First Division League: 2023–24

Saudi Arabia U20

- AFC U-19 Championship: 2018

Saudi Arabia U23

- AFC U-23 Asian Cup: 2022

Individual

- AFC U-19 Championship MVP: 2018
- Asian Young Footballer of the Year: 2018
- Saudi Pro League Young Player of the Year: 2018–19
