= Sebá =

Brazilian footballer (born 1992)

Personal information
- Full name: Sebastião de Freitas Couto Júnior
- Date of birth: June 8, 1992 (age 34)
- Place of birth: Salvador, Brazil
- Height: 1.79 m (5 ft 10 in)
- Positions: Winger; forward

Team information
- Current team: Marko
- Number: 92

Youth career
- 2008–2010: Cruzeiro
- 2008: → Itaúna (loan)

Senior career*
Years	Team	Apps	(Gls)
2010–2013	Cruzeiro	15	(9)
2012	→ Nacional-MG (loan)	8	(1)
2012–2013	→ Porto B (loan)	25	(2)
2012–2013	→ Porto (loan)	4	(0)
2013–2015	Estoril	52	(8)
2015–2019	Olympiacos	61	(6)
2018	→ Chongqing Lifan (loan)	12	(3)
2019–2022	Al-Shabab	56	(18)
2022–2023	Ionikos	22	(2)
2023–2024	Al-Salmiya	0	(0)
2024–2025	Panionios	16	(4)
2025–	Marko	16	(6)

International career^{‡}
2011	Brazil U20	2	(0)
- * Club domestic league appearances and goals as of 4 March 2026 ‡ National team caps and goals as of June 21, 2011

Sebastião de Freitas Couto Júnior, better known as Sebá (born June 8, 1992) is a Brazilian professional footballer who plays mainly as a winger for Greek Super League 2 club Marko.

== Career ==
Born in Salvador, Bahia, Sebá started his career in the Brazilian team Cruzeiro, but he moved to Dragões FC Porto (mainly reserve team). Sebá is a midfielder who can play in all fronts of the attack, although he is more efficient on one side. With good ball striking and an advanced high speed, the Brazilian has yet to win on a consistent whole match and after a couple of matches in the Primeira Liga considered a new Hulk in power. Faced with increased competition, FC Porto however decided not to activate the clause allowing him to finally join the player and Estoril did not miss the opportunity. Playing in the UEFA Europa League just months after being promoted to the first division, the Lusitanian club take advantage of its close relationship with the Brazilian company Traffic (Agency of players) that owns part of the rights of the player, to complete his transfer.

On 19 August 2015, Olympiacos confirmed the signing of Brazilian forward Sebá as the Greek champion tries boosted its squad ahead of the start of the new season. Sebá signed a four-year contract for a reported fee of €1.7 million and joined the Piraeus club from Portuguese side Estoril. The 23-year-old forward followed the footsteps of his fellow Portuguese and former manager at Estoril, Marco Silva, who took over as Olympiacos coach in the summer . On 5 December 2015, he scored his first goal with a low finish after taking the rebound from Jimmy Durmaz shot in the Super League Greece in a 4-3 away victory against Panthrakikos. On 7 January 2016, he scored in a 4–1 away win against Chania for the Greek Football Cup. He was named man of the match. On summer of 2016, Seba could be on the move as several clubs from Brazil have expressed an interest for his services. Moreover, he attracted interest from Mexican clubs in the past which is expected to be revived until the end of the window. Olympiacos seek for a fee in the region of €2 million for Seba and if an offer of that region comes in, then the Greek giants will accept the bid and the transfer will go through. Eventually he stayed in the club, as Paulo Bento is attracted from his abilities.

On 11 September 2016, he scored his first goal for the 2016–17 season in a 6–1 home win against Veria. Despite his mediocre performance in the Super League, he scored repeatedly in UEFA Europa League. On mid April, reports in Turkey insisted that Galatasaray would make a move to sign Olympiacos winger over the summer transfer window. Galatasaray has rubbished the rumours linking them with Seba, however reports in Turkey continue to link the Brazilian winger with Galatasaray. On 25 April 2017, Olympiacos winger faced a three-game suspension following his kick on Sergio Araujo in the semi-final of the Cup against AEK Athens. Seba is being accused for misconduct after his decision to kick AEK winger. He finished the season having three goals and 10 assists (1st in the League) and had a vital role in his club's seventh consecutive League title.

In contrary to an excellent 2016-17 season, Sebá didn't score a goal in 20 appearances in the first half of the 2017-18 season, and as he has hardly managed to be in Oscar García's choices, it is not excluded his retirement from the club as the winter transfer window is still open to Turkey, Russia and China.

On 3 July 2018, Sebá joined Chinese Super League side Chongqing Lifan, on loan from Olympiacos. After six months he returned to Olympiacos and during the winter transfer period he signed a 3 1/2-year contract with Al-Shabab FC for an undisclosed fee.

== Career statistics ==
As of match played 1 March 2026

Appearances and goals by club, season and competition
Club	Season	League			State league		Cup		League cup		Continental		Total	
Club	Season	Division	Apps	Goals	Apps	Goals	Apps	Goals	Apps	Goals	Apps	Goals	Apps	Goals
Cruzeiro	2010	Série A	3	0	—		—		—		—		3	0
Cruzeiro	2011	Série A	7	0	0	0	—		—		0	0	7	0
Cruzeiro	Total		10	0	0	0	—		—		0	0	10	0
Nacional-MG	2012	Campeonato Mineiro	—		8	1	—		—		—		8	1
FC Porto B	2012–13	Segunda Liga	25	2	—		—		—		—		25	2
Porto	2012–13	Primeira Liga	4	0	—		1	0	2	0	0	0	7	0
Estoril	2013–14	Primeira Liga	18	4	—		4	2	2	0	9	2	33	8
Estoril	2014–15	Primeira Liga	33	4	—		0	0	3	1	6	0	42	5
Estoril	2015–16	Primeira Liga	1	0	—		—		—		—		1	0
Estoril	Total		52	8	—		4	2	5	1	15	2	76	13
Olympiacos	2015–16	Super League Greece	19	2	—		5	2	—		8	0	32	4
Olympiacos	2016–17	Super League Greece	26	3	—		5	0	—		12	4	43	7
Olympiacos	2017–18	Super League Greece	13	0	—		2	0	—		7	0	22	0
Olympiacos	Total		58	5	—		12	2	—		27	4	97	11
Chongqing Dangdai (loan)	2018	Chinese Super League	12	3	—		0	0	—		—		12	3
Al-Shabab	2018–19	Saudi Professional League	12	6	—		1	0	—		—		13	6
Al-Shabab	2019–20	Saudi Professional League	25	5	—		2	1	—		—		27	6
Al-Shabab	2020–21	Saudi Professional League	16	7	—		0	0	—		—		16	7
Al-Shabab	2021–22	Saudi Professional League	3	0	—		0	0	—		—		3	0
Al-Shabab	Total		56	18	—		3	1	—		—		59	19
Ionikos	2022–23	Super League Greece	22	2	—		1	0	—		—		23	2
Al-Salmiya	2023–24	Kuwait Premier League			—				—		—			
Panionios	2024–25	Super League Greece 2	16	4	—		3	0	—		—		19	4
Marko	2025–26	Super League Greece 2	16	6	—		3	0	—		—		19	6
Career Total			271	48	8	1	27	5	7	1	42	6	355	61

== Honours ==
=== Club ===
Porto

- Primeira Liga: 2012–13

Olympiacos

- Super League Greece: 2015–16, 2016–17

=== Individual ===
- Super League Greece top assists provider: 2016–17
