= Mohammed Salem (footballer, born 1985) =

Saudi Arabian footballer

Personal information
- Full name: Mohammed Abdullah Salem
- Date of birth: August 6, 1985 (age 41)
- Place of birth: Saudi Arabia
- Height: 1.75 m (5 ft 9 in)
- Position: Defender

Youth career
- Al-Jabalain

Senior career*
Years	Team	Apps	(Gls)
2005–2006	Al-Jabalain		
2006–2012	Al-Ittihad	23	(0)
2012	Al-Qadisiyah	6	(0)
2012–2017	Al-Faisaly	122	(9)
2017–2021	Al-Shabab	99	(3)
2021–2023	Al-Raed	57	(1)
2023–2024	Al-Kawkab		
- * Club domestic league appearances and goals as of 31 May 2023

Mohammed Abdullah Salem (Arabic: محمد عبدالله سالم, born 6 August 1985) is a Saudi football player, who plays as defender.

== Career ==
On 14 August 2023, Salem joined Saudi Second Division side Al-Kawkab.
