= Hassan Raghfawi =

Saudi Arabian footballer

Personal information
- Full name: Hassan Mohammed Hussain Raghfawi
- Date of birth: September 15, 1995 (age 31)
- Place of birth: Riyadh, Saudi Arabia
- Height: 1.77 m (5 ft 10 in)
- Position: Left-back

Team information
- Current team: Al-Mehmal
- Number: 12

Youth career
- Al-Shabab

Senior career*
Years	Team	Apps	(Gls)
2016–2020	Al-Shabab	1	(0)
2017–2018	→ Al-Mujazzal (loan)		
2018–2020	→ Damac (loan)	33	(0)
2020–2021	Al-Batin	11	(0)
2021–2022	Al-Kawkab	23	(0)
2022–2023	Al-Ain	8	(0)
2023–2024	Al-Shoulla	12	(0)
2024–2025	Al-Selmiyah		
2025–	Al-Mehmal		

International career
2016–2017	Saudi Arabia U23		
- * Club domestic league appearances and goals as of 20 September 2020

Hassan Mohammed Hussain Raghfawi (Arabic: حسن محمد رغفاوي, born 15 September 1995) is a Saudi Arabian football player who currently plays as a left-back for Al-Mehmal.

== Career ==
On 12 July 2023, Raghfawi joined Second Division side Al-Shoulla.

On 5 October 2024, Raghfawi joined Third Division side Al-Selmiyah.
