= Abdulmalek Al-Shammeri =

Saudi Arabian footballer

Personal information
- Full name: Abdulmalek Malweh Al-Shammeri
- Date of birth: 16 August 1995 (age 31)
- Place of birth: Saudi Arabia
- Height: 1.77 m (5 ft 10 in)
- Positions: Left-back; winger

Team information
- Current team: Al-Anwar
- Number: 17

Youth career
- Al-Shabab

Senior career*
Years	Team	Apps	(Gls)
2016–2021	Al-Shabab	33	(0)
2017–2018	→ Al-Batin (loan)	25	(0)
2020–2021	→ Al-Batin (loan)	22	(0)
2021–2022	Al-Fayha	1	(0)
2022–2023	Al-Raed	8	(0)
2023–2025	Al-Taawoun	9	(1)
2024–2025	→ Al-Orobah (loan)	24	(0)
2025–	Al-Anwar	0	(0)
- * Club domestic league appearances and goals as of 2 April 2024

Abdulmalek Malwah Al-Shammeri (Arabic: عبدالملك ملواح الشمري, born 16 August 1995) is a Saudi Arabian professional footballer who plays as a winger or left-back for Al-Anwar.

== Career ==
On 20 July 2023, Al-Shammeri joined Al-Taawoun on a two-year deal. On 23 August 2024, Al-Shammeri joined Al-Orobah on a one-year loan.

On 1 September 2025, Al-Shammeri joined Al-Anwar.

== Honours ==
Al-Fayha

- King Cup: 2021–22
