= 2016–17 Al-Taawoun FC season =

Al-Taawoun
2016–17 season
- President: Mohammed Al-Qasim
- Manager: Darije Kalezić (until 16 October 2016); Constantin Gâlcă (from 18 October 2016 to 20 March 2017); José Gomes (from 21 March 2017)
- Stadium: King Abdullah Sport City Stadium
- SPL: 7th
- Crown Prince Cup: Round of 16
- King Cup: Semi-finals
- AFC Champions League: Group Stage
- Top goalscorer: League: Mounir El Hamdaoui (5); All: Alassane N'Diaye (7)
- Highest home attendance: 25,879 vs Lokomotiv Tashkent (20 February 2017)
- Lowest home attendance: 2,404 vs Al-Batin (29 April 2017)
- Average home league attendance: 5,025
Home colours	Away colours	Third colours
- All statistics correct as of 4 May 2017.

The 2016–17 Al-Taawoun season was the club's 61st season in existence and its 9th (non-consecutive) season in the top tier of Saudi Arabian football. This season, Al-Taawoun participated in the Pro League for the seventh consecutive season as well as the King Cup and Crown Prince Cup. The season covered the period from 1 July 2016 to 30 June 2017. The club also entered the 2017 AFC Champions League at the group stage.

== Pre-season friendlies ==
15 July 2016	Al-Taawoun (Saudi Arabia)	1–3	(England) Reading	Arnhem
18:00 AST	Al-Zain 81'	Report	Sandro 39' (o.g.); Williams 40'; Kermorgant 90'	Stadium: Sportpark Schuytgraaf

16 July 2016	Vitesse (Netherlands)	0–2	(Saudi Arabia) Al-Taawoun	Arnhem
16:45		Report	Al-Turki 30'; Otaif 45'	Stadium: Sportpark Schuytgraaf

23 July 2016	Twente (Netherlands)	3–3	(Saudi Arabia) Al-Taawoun	Beckum
14:00	Jensen 46'; Oosterwijk 50'; Ziyech 59'	Report	Otaif 37'; Al-Salman 67'; Al-Hussain 68'	Stadium: Sportpark De Kruudnhof; Attendance: 1,500; Referee: Serdar Gözübüyük

23 July 2016	Al-Taawoun (Saudi Arabia)	0–4	(Netherlands) De Graafschap	Beckum
19:00		Report	Koolhof 19'; Vermeij 64', 72'; Bannink 78'	Stadium: Sportpark De Kruudnhof

30 July 2016	Al-Taawoun (Saudi Arabia)	0–0	(Qatar) Al-Kharaitiyat	Doha
18:00		Report		Stadium: Al Akheer Stadium

31 July 2016	Al-Ahli (Qatar)	1–2	(Saudi Arabia) Al-Taawoun	Doha
18:15	Jabbari 20' (pen.)	Report	Al-Zain 5'; Al-Shammeri 30'	Stadium: Hamad bin Khalifa Stadium

5 August 2016	Al-Taawoun (Saudi Arabia)	5–1	(Saudi Arabia) Al-Tai	Buraidah
18:30	Al-Hussain 38', 63'; Amro 45'; Al-Shammeri 51'; Sandro 90'		Al-Shammeri 53'	Stadium: Al-Taawoun Club Stadium

== Players ==
=== First team squad ===
- This section lists players who were in Al-Taawoun's first team squad at any point during the 2016–17 season
- Asterisks indicates player left mid-season
- Hash symbol indicates player retired mid-season
- Italics indicate loan player

No.	Nationality	Name	Position	Joined	Signed from
Goalkeepers
1	(Saudi Arabia)	Yazid Al-Sayah	GK	2015	Youth
22	(Saudi Arabia)	Fahad Al-Shammari	GK	2016	(Saudi Arabia) Al-Raed
23	(Saudi Arabia)	Sultan Al-Ghamdi	GK	2015	Youth
32	(Saudi Arabia)	Fayz Al-Sabiay	GK	2015	(Saudi Arabia) Al-Hilal
Defenders
3	(Saudi Arabia)	Abdullah Kanno	CB	2015	(Saudi Arabia) Al-Qadisiyah
4	(Portugal)	Ricardo Machado	CB	2015	(Romania) Dinamo București
5	(Saudi Arabia)	Talal Al-Absi	CB	2015	(Saudi Arabia) Al-Ittihad
13	(Saudi Arabia)	Ibrahim Al-Zubaidi	LB	2016	(Saudi Arabia) Najran
16	(Saudi Arabia)	Naif Al-Mousa	LB / CB	2014	(Saudi Arabia) Al-Hazm
17	(Saudi Arabia)	Mahmoud Muaaz	RB	2014	(Saudi Arabia) Najran
28	(Saudi Arabia)	Abdullah Al-Shameri	LB	2013	Youth
Midfielders
6	(Saudi Arabia)	Abdulrahman Al-Barakah	CM / DM	2015	(Saudi Arabia) Al-Shabab
10	(Syria)	Jehad Al-Hussain	AM / SS	2014	(United Arab Emirates) Dubai
14	(Saudi Arabia)	Mohammed Abousaban	DM / CM	2017	(Saudi Arabia) Al-Fateh
18	(Saudi Arabia)	Madallah Al-Olayan	DM	2012	Youth
27	(Saudi Arabia)	Saeed Al-Dossari	RM / RB	2016	(Saudi Arabia) Al-Shabab
29	(Romania)	Lucian Sânmărtean	AM / CM	2017	(Romania) Pandurii
37	(Saudi Arabia)	Abdulaziz Al-Sharid	AM	2016	(Saudi Arabia) Al-Hilal
49	(Saudi Arabia)	Ahmed Al-Zain	LW / RW	2015	(Saudi Arabia) Abha
55	(Brazil)	Sandro Manoel*	DM	2015	(Brazil) Ceará
77	(Saudi Arabia)	Ibrahim Al-Telhi	LW / AM	2015	Youth
80	(Saudi Arabia)	Abdulmajeed Al-Sawat	CM	2017	(Saudi Arabia) Al-Hilal
Forwards
7	(Saudi Arabia)	Mousa Al-Shameri	CF	2016	(Saudi Arabia) Al-Shabab
9	(Morocco)	Mounir El Hamdaoui*	CF	2016	(Qatar) Umm Salal
11	(Saudi Arabia)	Saqer Otaif	CF	2016	(Saudi Arabia) Al-Wehda
19	(France)	Alassane N'Diaye	LW / CF	2017	(France) Laval
70	(Saudi Arabia)	Mohammed Al-Saiari	CF	2017	(Saudi Arabia) Al-Ettifaq

== Transfers ==
=== Transfers in ===
Date	Position	Nationality	Name	From	Fee	Ref.
1 July 2016	FW	(Saudi Arabia)	Mousa Al-Shameri	Al-Shabab	Free transfer	
1 July 2016	DF	(Saudi Arabia)	Ibrahim Al-Zubaidi	Najran	Undisclosed	
1 July 2016	MF	(Saudi Arabia)	Saeed Al-Dossari	Al-Shabab	Free transfer	
1 July 2016	GK	(Saudi Arabia)	Fahad Al-Shammari	Al-Raed	Free transfer	
1 July 2016	FW	(Saudi Arabia)	Saqer Otaif	Al-Wehda	Free transfer	
6 August 2016	FW	(Morocco)	Mounir El Hamdaoui	Umm Salal	Free transfer	
2 September 2016	MF	(Saudi Arabia)	Abdulaziz Al-Sharid	Al-Hilal	Free transfer	
10 January 2017	MF	(Romania)	Lucian Sânmărtean	Pandurii	Free transfer	
31 January 2017	FW	(France)	Alassane N'Diaye	Laval	Undisclosed	

=== Transfers out ===
Date	Position	Nationality	Name	To	Fee	Ref.
1 July 2016	FW	(Cameroon)	Paul Efoulou	Al-Sailiya	Free transfer	
1 July 2016	DF	(Saudi Arabia)	Kamel Al-Mor	Al-Wehda	Free transfer	
1 July 2016	MF	(Saudi Arabia)	Abdulaziz Al-Dhefiri		Released	
1 July 2016	MF	(Saudi Arabia)	Abdulmajeed Al-Ruwaili	Al-Hilal	Undisclosed	
11 July 2016	DF	(Saudi Arabia)	Adnan Fallatah	Al-Ittihad	Free transfer	
1 August 2016	FW	(Saudi Arabia)	Abdulmajeed Al-Daeej	Al-Nojoom	Free transfer	
13 August 2016	FW	(Saudi Arabia)	Bader Al-Khamees	Al-Nahda	Free transfer	
30 August 2016	GK	(Saudi Arabia)	Faisal Al-Merqeb	Al-Nahda	Free transfer	
27 September 2016	MF	(Saudi Arabia)	Ahmed Al-Suhail	Najran	Free transfer	
12 October 2016	DF	(Saudi Arabia)	Abdulwahab Al-Zahrani	Weg	Free transfer	
31 January 2017	FW	(Morocco)	Mounir El Hamdaoui		Released	

=== Loans in ===
Date from	Date until	Position	Nationality	Name	From
1 July 2016	28 December 2016	DF	(Saudi Arabia)	Abdurahman Al-Shammeri	(Saudi Arabia) Al-Nassr
1 July 2016	10 January 2017	MF	(Saudi Arabia)	Mosaab Al-Otaibi	(Saudi Arabia) Al-Nassr
13 July 2016	28 December 2016	DF	(Saudi Arabia)	Sari Amro	(Saudi Arabia) Al-Shabab
7 January 2017	End of Season	FW	(Saudi Arabia)	Mohammed Al-Saiari	(Saudi Arabia) Al-Ettifaq
8 January 2017	End of Season	MF	(Saudi Arabia)	Abdulmajeed Al-Sawat	(Saudi Arabia) Al-Hilal
31 January 2017	End of Season	MF	(Saudi Arabia)	Mohammed Abousaban	(Saudi Arabia) Al-Fateh

=== Loans out ===
Date from	Date until	Position	Nationality	Name	To
5 July 2016	End of Season	MF	(Saudi Arabia)	Nawaf Al-Sehimai	(Saudi Arabia) Damac
7 September 2016	End of Season	MF	(Saudi Arabia)	Ahmed Al-Turki	(Saudi Arabia) Al-Tai
11 January 2017	End of Season	MF	(Saudi Arabia)	Abdullah Al-Salman	(Saudi Arabia) Al-Nahda
24 January 2017	End of Season	MF	(Brazil)	Sandro Manoel	(Saudi Arabia) Al-Fateh

== Competitions ==
=== Overall ===
Competition	Started round	Current position / round	Final position / round	First match	Last match
Professional League	—	—	7th	12 August 2016	4 May 2017
King Cup	Round of 32	—	Semi-finals	20 January 2017	13 May 2017
Crown Prince Cup	Round of 32	—	Round of 16	28 August 2016	29 September 2016
AFC Champions League	Group Stage			20 February 2017	9 May 2017

Last Updated: 13 May 2017

=== Pro League ===
==== League table ====
Pos	Team	Pld	W	D	L	GF	GA	GD	Pts
5	Al-Raed	26	11	2	13	37	47	−10	35
6	Al-Shabab	26	8	9	9	28	32	−4	33
7	Al-Taawoun	26	9	4	13	33	40	−7	31
8	Al-Fateh	26	7	8	11	33	39	−6	29
9	Al-Faisaly	26	6	10	10	30	41	−11	28 (Note: Al-Faisaly finished ahead of Al-Qadisiyah on head-to-head points: Al-Qadisiyah 1–1 Al-Faisaly, Al-Faisaly 3–2 Al-Qadisiyah)

Updated to match(es) played on 4 May 2017. Source: slstat.com
Rules for classification: 1) Points; 2) Head-to-head points; 3) Head-to-head goal difference; 4) Total goal difference; 5) Total goals scored; 6) Play-off (only for deciding champion, relegation and AFC competitions participation).

==== Results summary ====
Overall								Home						Away					
Pld	W	D	L	GF	GA	GD	Pts	W	D	L	GF	GA	GD	W	D	L	GF	GA	GD
26	9	4	13	33	40	−7	31	6	3	4	18	16	+2	3	1	9	15	24	−9

Last updated: 4 May 2017.
Source: Competitive matches

==== Results by round ====
Round	1	2	3	4	5	6	7	8	9	10	11	12	13	14	15	16	17	18	19	20	21	22	23	24	25	26
Ground	A	H	H	A	A	H	A	A	H	H	A	A	H	H	A	A	H	H	A	H	H	A	A	H	H	A
Result	L	L	W	D	L	D	W	L	D	W	W	L	L	W	L	L	W	L	W	L	W	L	L	D	W	L
Position	10	13	10	11	11	11	10	11	10	8	7	7	8	7	7	8	7	8	6	8	5	6	7	7	6	7

Updated to match(es) played on 4 May 2017. Source:
A = Away; H = Home; W = Win; D = Draw; L = Loss

==== Matches ====
All times are local, AST (UTC+3).

Win Draw Loss Postponed

12 August 2016 1	Al-Wehda	3–2	Al-Taawoun	Makkah
21:05	Lima 39'; Madkhali 46'; Al-Baour (yellow card) 49'; Al-Malki (yellow card) 84'; Al-Musalem 90+4', (yellow card) 90+4'	Report	Al-Mousa 29'; Muaaz (yellow card) 39'; Al-Absi (yellow card) 89'; El Hamdaoui 90+2'	Stadium: King Abdul Aziz Stadium; Attendance: 681; Referee: Khalid Al-Teris

19 August 2016 2	Al-Taawoun	0–2	Al-Hilal	Buraidah
21:05	Amr (yellow card) 27'; Kanno (yellow card) 42'; Absi (yellow card) 76'	Report	Jahfali (yellow card) 37'; Ghazi (yellow card) 39'; Al-Abed 43'; S. Al-Dawsari (yellow card) 45+3'; Al-Shalhoub 48' (pen.); Al-Khaibri (yellow card) 71'	Stadium: King Abdullah Sport City Stadium; Attendance: 11,966; Referee: Shukri Al-Hanfosh

16 September 2016 3	Al-Taawoun	2–1	Al-Raed	Buraidah
18:45	El Hamdaoui 45+2'; Al-Dossari 56'	Report	Al-Shehri (yellow card) 48', (goal) 65'; Gilmar (yellow card) 67'	Stadium: King Abdullah Sport City Stadium; Attendance: 3,501; Referee: Ivan Bebek (Croatia)

23 September 2016 4	Al-Shabab	2–2	Al-Taawoun	Riyadh
18:10	Machado 24' (o.g.); Al-Sulayhem (yellow card) 53'; Heberty 78'; Al-Fahad (yellow card) 90+1'	Report	Al-Sharid (yellow card) 57'; Otaif 67'; Muath 87' (o.g.)	Stadium: Prince Faisal bin Fahd Stadium; Attendance: 1,125; Referee: Fahad Al-Mirdasi

14 October 2016 5	Al-Ittihad	3–1	Al-Taawoun	Jeddah
20:15	Fallatah (yellow card) 18'; Al-Muwallad 53', 74' (pen.); Qassem (yellow card) 61'; Kahraba 90+4'	Report	Al-Absi (yellow card) 17'; Kanno (yellow card) 44'; Sandro 62' (pen.)	Stadium: King Abdullah Sports City; Attendance: 17,571; Referee: Khaled Al-Teris

20 October 2016 6	Al-Taawoun	0–0	Al-Fateh	Buraidah
18:10	Al-Zain (yellow card) 57'	Report	Al-Hamdan (yellow card) 40'; Al-Fuhaid (yellow card) 69'	Stadium: King Abdullah Sport City Stadium; Attendance: 3,143; Referee: Mohammed Al-Qarni

28 October 2016 7	Al-Qadisiyah	0–1	Al-Taawoun	Dammam
17:40	Al-Sobhi (yellow card) 60'; Bismark (yellow card) 79'; Masrahi (yellow card) 84'	Report	Otaif 38'; Al-Shammari (yellow card) 47'; Al-Zain (yellow card) 89'	Stadium: Prince Mohamed bin Fahd Stadium; Attendance: 221; Referee: Faisal Al-Balawi

5 November 2016 8	Al-Ettifaq	3–0	Al-Taawoun	Dammam
17:35	Al-Kwikbi 48'; Fofana (yellow card) 63'; Al-Saiari 68', (yellow card) 68'; Al-Hazaa 87'	Report	Al-Sharid (yellow card) 35'; Al-Absi (yellow card) 62'; Al-Shammeri (yellow card) 81'	Stadium: Prince Mohamed bin Fahd Stadium; Attendance: 1,235; Referee: Abdulrahman Al-Shehri

18 November 2016 9	Al-Taawoun	0–0	Al-Faisaly	Buraidah
19:45		Report	Al-Muwallad (yellow card) 45'; Everaldo (yellow card) 73'; Al-Mutairi (yellow card) 83'; Fallatah (yellow card) 88'	Stadium: King Abdullah Sport City Stadium; Attendance: 4,113; Referee: Hussain Abu Shaheen

25 November 2016 10	Al-Taawoun	2–1	Al-Nassr	Buraidah
17:50	El Hamdaoui 30'; Al-Dossari 32'; Al-Sharid (yellow card) 35'; Al-Barakah (yellow card) 79'	Report	Al-Raheb 78'; Tomasov (yellow card) 81'; Ayala (yellow card) 83'	Stadium: King Abdullah Sport City Stadium; Attendance: 5,013; Referee: Sultan Al-Harbi

3 December 2016 11	Al-Khaleej	0–1	Al-Taawoun	Khobar
17:30	Al-Jadaani (yellow card) 55'; Al-Freej (yellow card) 90+4'	Report	Al-Barakah (yellow card) 14'; El Hamdaoui 51'	Stadium: Prince Saud bin Jalawi Stadium; Attendance: 103; Referee: Fahad Al-Mirdasi

8 December 2016 12	Al-Batin	1–0	Al-Taawoun	Hafar al-Batin
17:45	Ayyadah (yellow card) 24'; Silva 45+2'; Al-Muheeni (yellow card) 90'	Report	Sandro (yellow card) 41' (yellow-red card) 90+2'; Machado (yellow card) 90+6'; Al-Olayan (yellow card) 90+7'	Stadium: Al-Batin Club Stadium; Attendance: 2,577; Referee: Faisal Al-Balawi

17 December 2016 13	Al-Taawoun	2–3	Al-Ahli	Buraidah
19:45	Machado 14'; El Hamdaoui 70' (pen.); Sari Amr (yellow card) 87'	Report	Al-Somah 9' (pen.); Asiri (yellow card) 15', (goal) 67'; Al-Moasher (yellow card) 38'; Kurdi (yellow card) 71'; Al-Dossari 80' (o.g.)	Stadium: King Abdullah Sport City Stadium; Attendance: 2,774; Referee: Abdulrahman Al-Sultan

23 December 2016 14	Al-Taawoun	3–1	Al-Wehda	Buraidah
18:00	Al-Barakah (yellow card) 7'; Al-Mousa 32'; Machado 35'; Al-Zain 59'; Al-Shammari (yellow card) 86'	Report	Belal 60'; Fallatah (yellow card) 69'; Al-Musalem (yellow card) 87'	Stadium: King Abdullah Sport City Stadium; Attendance: 2,596; Referee: Shukri Al-Hanfosh

31 December 2016 15	Al-Hilal	4–2	Al-Taawoun	Riyadh
19:50	Machado 4' (o.g.); Bonatini 11', 22'; Al-Qahtani 69' (pen.)	Report	Al-Breik 45' (o.g.); Machado (yellow card) 58', (goal) 87'; Al-Mousa (yellow card) 68'	Stadium: Prince Faisal bin Fahd Stadium; Attendance: 6,386; Referee: Khaled Al-Teris

26 January 2017 16	Al-Raed	3–2	Al-Taawoun	Buraidah
18:25	Bangoura 4', 48' (pen.); Al-Qahtani 9'; Al-Yami (yellow card) 40'; Al-Ayyaf (yellow card) 58' (yellow-red card) 67'	Report	Al-Mousa (yellow card) 22'; El Hamdaoui (yellow card) 40'; Al-Absi (yellow card) 47'; Al-Zain 52', 56'	Stadium: King Abdullah Sport City Stadium; Attendance: 7,859; Referee: Szymon Marciniak (Poland)

1 February 2017 17	Al-Taawoun	2–0	Al-Shabab	Buraidah
18:25	Al-Saiari 27'; Al-Shameri 78'	Report	Bahebri (yellow card) 70'; Kariri (yellow card) 90+1'	Stadium: King Abdullah Sport City Stadium; Attendance: 6,838; Referee: Sultan Al-Harbi

11 February 2017 18	Al-Taawoun	1–2	Al-Ittihad	Buraidah
20:15	Al-Saiari (yellow card) 42'; Al-Mousa (yellow card) 58'; Al-Dossari 64'; Al-Barakah (yellow card) 74'; Abousabaan (yellow card) 81' (yellow-red card) 82'; Al-Zain (yellow card) 90+2'	Report	Al Ansari 56'; Villanueva 59'	Stadium: King Abdullah Sport City Stadium; Attendance: 11,515; Referee: Shukri Al-Hanfosh

16 February 2017 19	Al-Fateh	0–2	Al-Taawoun	Al-Hasa
18:15	Hazazi (yellow card) 28'; Buhumaid (yellow card) 87'	Report	Al-Shammeri (yellow card) 77'; Kanno (yellow card) 85'; N'Diaye 85'; Al-Hussain 90+5' (pen.)	Stadium: Prince Abdullah bin Jalawi Stadium; Attendance: 2,143; Referee: Abdulrahman Al-Shehri

4 March 2017 20	Al-Taawoun	1–3	Al-Qadisiyah	Buraidah
18:45	Abousaban (yellow card) 14'; Al-Saiari (yellow card) 82'; Al-Olayan 88'; Al-Shammeri (yellow card) 90+2'	Report	Al-Obaid (yellow card) 38'; Élton 72' (pen.); Bismark 73'; Al-Khabrani (yellow card) 82'; Fallatah 84'	Stadium: King Abdullah Sport City Stadium; Attendance: 5,152; Referee: Fedayi San (Switzerland)

9 March 2017 21	Al-Taawoun	1–0	Al-Ettifaq	Buraidah
18:50	Kanno (yellow card) 57'; Al-Olayan (yellow card) 64'; N'Diaye 86'	Report	Al-Sonain (yellow card) 79' (yellow-red card) 90+2'; Kadesh (yellow card) 90+2'	Stadium: King Abdullah Sport City Stadium; Attendance: 2,420; Referee: Mohammed Al-Hoaish

6 April 2017 22	Al-Faisaly	1–0	Al-Taawoun	Al Majma'ah
19:00	Abdulaziz (yellow card) 64'; Axente 80'	Report	Muaaz (yellow card) 59'	Stadium: King Salman Sport City Stadium; Attendance: 639; Referee: Sultan Al-Harbi

15 April 2017 23	Al-Nassr	2–1	Al-Taawoun	Riyadh
20:45	Ayala (yellow card) 28', (goal) 50'; Al-Sahlawi 63'	Report	Al-Saiari 16'; Al-Barakah (yellow card) 34'; Kanno (yellow card) 78'	Stadium: Prince Faisal bin Fahd Stadium; Attendance: 1,422; Referee: Mohammed Al-Qarni

20 April 2017 24	Al-Taawoun	0–0	Al-Khaleej	Buraidah
19:10	Sânmărtean (yellow card) 85'	Report	Hazazi (yellow card) 45+3'; Jandson (yellow card) 68'; Al-Kharaa (yellow card) 69'; Al-Shoalah (yellow card) 90+5'	Stadium: King Abdullah Sport City Stadium; Attendance: 3,894; Referee: Khaled Al-Teris

29 April 2017 25	Al-Taawoun	4–3	Al-Batin	Buraidah
19:15	Al-Saiari 21', 59'; N'Diaye 45+1'; Al-Dossari 55'; Machado (yellow card) 74'	Report	Al-Shamrani (yellow card) 35'; Al-Enezi (yellow card) 48'; Tarabai 75'; Metlaq 80'; Jhonnattann 83'	Stadium: King Abdullah Sport City Stadium; Attendance: 2,404; Referee: Khaled Salwi

4 May 2017 26	Al-Ahli	2–1	Al-Taawoun	Jeddah
20:50	Assiri 20', 59'; Bakshween (yellow card) 63'; Al-Mowalad (yellow card) 90+5'	Report	Kanno (yellow card) 34'; Al-Shameri (yellow card) 35'; Al-Hussain 89'; Al-Dossari (yellow card) 90+1'	Stadium: King Abdullah Sports City; Attendance: 2,241; Referee: Mohammed Al-Hoaish

=== Crown Prince Cup ===
All times are local, AST (UTC+3).

28 August 2016 Round of 32	Al-Orobah	2–3 (a.e.t.)	Al-Taawoun	Sakakah
20:55	Cortez 50'; Al-Yami (yellow card) 52'; Sariweh (yellow card) 53'; Al-Aboud (yellow card) 62', (goal) 90+2'; Al-Nawi (yellow card) 97'; Al-Hamdhi (yellow card) 116'; Rabee (yellow card) 119'		Al-Zain 43'; Al-Dossari 45' (o.g.); Al-Shameri 119'	Stadium: Al-Oruba Club Stadium; Referee: Faisal Al-Balawi

29 September 2016 Round of 16	Al-Taawoun	0–2	Al-Batin	Buraidah
18:35	Al-Shammeri (yellow card) 37'; Al-Hussain (yellow card) 90+3'	Report	Silva 74'; W. Al-Enezi (yellow card) 90+3', (goal) 90+5'	Stadium: King Abdullah Sport City Stadium; Referee: Faisal Al-Balawi

=== King Cup ===
20 January 2017 Round of 32	Al-Nojoom	0–1	Al-Taawoun	Al-Hasa
17:55	Al-Ahmed (yellow card) 12'	Report	Machado 90+2'	Stadium: Prince Abdullah bin Jalawi Stadium; Referee: Fahad Al-Nawaf

7 February 2017 Round of 16	Al-Raed	0–1	Al-Taawoun	Buraidah
20:15	Al-Shammeri (yellow card) 70'; Al-Bishi (yellow card) 86'; Al-Mousa (yellow card) 90+2'	Report	Muaaz (yellow card) 62'; Al-Zubaidi (yellow card) 67'; Sânmărtean 87'	Stadium: King Abdullah Sport City Stadium; Referee: Arnold Hunter (Northern Ireland)

30 March 2017 Quarter-finals	Al-Ettifaq	2–2 (a.e.t.) (3–5 p)	Al-Taawoun	Dammam
20:15	Bouba 26'; Al-Hazaa 77'; Al-Dossari (yellow card) 104'	Report	Machado 19'; Al-Dossari 32'; Al-Saiari (yellow card) 90+2'; Kanno (yellow card) 120'	Stadium: Prince Mohamed bin Fahd Stadium; Attendance: 1,566; Referee: Khalid Al-Salawy
	Penalties
	Callejón (penalty missed); Al-Kwikbi (penalty scored); Al-Dossari (penalty scored); Bouba (penalty scored)		Machado (penalty scored); Al-Shameri (penalty scored); Al-Barakah (penalty scored); Al-Saiari (penalty scored); Sânmărtean (penalty scored)

13 May 2017 Semi-finals	Al-Hilal	4–3	Al-Taawoun	Riyadh
20:30	Kharbin 16', 46', 80'; Al-Hafith (yellow card) 28'; Al-Dawsari 62'	Report	N'Diaye 4', 90+4'; Al-Mousa (yellow card) 18'; Al-Olayan 76'	Stadium: Prince Faisal bin Fahd Stadium; Referee: Ivan Bebek (Croatia)

=== AFC Champions League ===
Al-Taawoun qualified for the Group Stage of the 2016–17 AFC Champions League by finishing fourth in the 2015–16 Saudi Professional League. It is their first participation in this competition.

==== Group stage ====
Pos	Team	Pld	W	D	L	GF	GA	GD	Pts	Qualification	AHL	EST	TAA	LOK
1	(United Arab Emirates) Al-Ahli	6	3	2	1	10	5	+5	11 (Note: Head-to-head results: Al-Ahli 2–1 Esteghlal, Esteghlal 1–1 Al-Ahli.)	Advance to knockout stage	—	2–1	0–0	4–0
2	(Iran) Esteghlal	6	3	2	1	10	5	+5	11	Advance to knockout stage	1–1	—	3–0	2–0
3	(Saudi Arabia) Al-Taawoun	6	1	2	3	7	12	−5	5 (Note: Head-to-head results: Al-Taawoun 1–0 Lokomotiv Tashkent, Lokomotiv Tashkent 4–4 Al-Taawoun.)		1–3	1–2	—	1–0
4	(Uzbekistan) Lokomotiv Tashkent	6	1	2	3	7	12	−5	5		2–0	1–1	4–4	—

Source: AFC
Rules for classification: Group stage tiebreakers
Notes:

20 February 2017 1	Al-Taawoun (Saudi Arabia)	1–0	(Uzbekistan) Lokomotiv Tashkent	Buraidah
18:40 UTC+3	Al-Absi 67', (yellow card) 80'; Al-Olayan (yellow card) 85'	Report	Kone (yellow card) 76'	Stadium: King Abdullah Sport City Stadium; Attendance: 25,879; Referee: Ahmed Al-Kaf (Oman)

27 February 2017 2	Esteghlal (Iran)	3–0	(Saudi Arabia) Al-Taawoun	Muscat
19:30 UTC+4	Rezaei 1'; Ansari (yellow card) 43'; M.Karimi 70'; Padovani 89'	Report	Muaaz (yellow card) 88'; Sânmărtean (yellow card) 90+4'	Stadium: Sultan Qaboos Sports Complex; Attendance: 1,050; Referee: Hiroyuki Kimura (Japan)

13 March 2017 3	Al-Ahli (United Arab Emirates)	0–0	(Saudi Arabia) Al-Taawoun	Dubai
20:30 UTC+4	Ribeiro (yellow card) 35'	Report		Stadium: Al-Rashid Stadium; Attendance: 2,335; Referee: Mohanad Qasim Eesee Sarray (Iraq)

11 April 2017 4	Al-Taawoun (Saudi Arabia)	1–3	(United Arab Emirates) Al-Ahli	Buraidah
21:00 UTC+3	Al-Mousa (yellow card) 37'; Machado (yellow card) 38'; N'Diaye 63' (pen.)	Report	Diop 37', 59', (yellow card) 63'; Everton 45'	Stadium: King Abdullah Sport City Stadium; Attendance: 16,135; Referee: Liu Kwok Man (Hong Kong)

25 April 2017 5	Lokomotiv Tashkent (Uzbekistan)	4–4	(Saudi Arabia) Al-Taawoun	Tashkent
17:00 UTC+5	Bikmaev 20', 32' (pen.), 47', (yellow card) 41'; Masharipov 81'	Report	Al-Mousa (yellow card) 7'; Al-Sawat 18'; Al-Hussain 65'; N'Diaye 69'; Al-Saiari (yellow card) 78'; Machado 90+1'	Stadium: Lokomotiv Stadium; Attendance: 3,155; Referee: Abdulrahman Al-Jassim (Qatar)

9 May 2017 6	Al-Taawoun (Saudi Arabia)	1–2	(Iran) Esteghlal	Doha
18:50 UTC+3	Al-Saiari 36', (yellow card) 53'; Al-Sawat (yellow card) 57'; Muaaz (yellow card) 63'; Al-Barakah (yellow card) 81'	Report	Ansari 19'; Ghorbani (yellow card) 39'; Rezaei 76'; Rahmati (yellow card) 90+3'	Stadium: Hamad bin Khalifa Stadium; Attendance: 375; Referee: Hettikamkanamge Perera (Sri Lanka)

== Statistics ==
=== Squad statistics ===
As of 13 May 2017.

No.	Pos	Nat	Player	Total		Pro League		King Cup		Crown Prince Cup		Champions League	
No.	Pos	Nat	Player	Apps	Goals	Apps	Goals	Apps	Goals	Apps	Goals	Apps	Goals
1	GK	(Saudi Arabia)	Yazid Al-Sayah	0	0	0	0	0	0	0	0	0	0
3	DF	(Saudi Arabia)	Abdullah Kanno	19	0	11+1	0	2	0	1	0	3+1	0
4	DF	(Portugal)	Ricardo Machado	35	6	24	3	4	2	1	0	6	1
5	DF	(Saudi Arabia)	Talal Al-Absi	22	1	18	0	1	0	1	0	2	1
6	MF	(Saudi Arabia)	Abdulrahman Al-Barakah	26	0	13+3	0	4	0	0	0	5+1	0
7	FW	(Saudi Arabia)	Mousa Al-Shameri	17	2	4+6	1	1+1	0	1+1	1	1+2	0
8	MF	(Saudi Arabia)	Mosaab Al-Otaibi*	5	0	0+4	0	0	0	1	0	0	0
9	FW	(Morocco)	Mounir El Hamdaoui*	13	5	10+2	5	0	0	1	0	0	0
10	MF	(Syria)	Jehad Al-Hussain	35	3	20+5	2	1+2	0	2	0	4+1	1
11	FW	(Saudi Arabia)	Saqer Otaif	16	2	7+6	2	0+1	0	0+1	0	0+1	0
13	DF	(Saudi Arabia)	Ibrahim Al-Zubaidi	12	0	8	0	2	0	0	0	1+1	0
14	MF	(Saudi Arabia)	Mohammed Abousaban	9	0	3+1	0	0	0	0	0	5	0
16	DF	(Saudi Arabia)	Naif Al-Mousa	32	2	19+3	2	2+1	0	2	0	4+1	0
17	DF	(Saudi Arabia)	Mahmoud Muaaz	24	0	12+4	0	3	0	1	0	4	0
18	MF	(Saudi Arabia)	Madallah Al-Olayan	10	2	2+4	1	1+1	1	0	0	1+1	0
19	FW	(France)	Alassane N'Diaye	17	7	6+2	3	2+1	2	0	0	6	2
20	DF	(Saudi Arabia)	Abdulrahman Al-Shammeri*	10	0	5+3	0	0	0	2	0	0	0
22	GK	(Saudi Arabia)	Fahad Al-Shammari	22	0	17	0	0	0	2	0	3	0
23	GK	(Saudi Arabia)	Sultan Al-Ghamdi	11	0	4+1	0	3	0	0	0	3	0
27	MF	(Saudi Arabia)	Saeed Al-Dossari	36	5	22+3	4	4	1	2	0	3+2	0
28	DF	(Saudi Arabia)	Abdullah Al-Shameri	15	0	6+3	0	3	0	0	0	3	0
29	MF	(Romania)	Lucian Sânmărtean	16	1	4+4	0	2+1	1	0	0	5	0
31	DF	(Saudi Arabia)	Sari Amro*	8	0	5+2	0	0	0	1	0	0	0
32	GK	(Saudi Arabia)	Fayz Al-Sabiay	2	0	2	0	0	0	0	0	0	0
37	MF	(Saudi Arabia)	Abdulaziz Al-Sharid	24	0	18+2	0	1	0	1	0	1+1	0
49	MF	(Saudi Arabia)	Ahmed Al-Zain	32	4	18+3	3	3+1	0	1+1	1	3+2	0
55	MF	(Brazil)	Sandro Manoel*	14	1	12	1	0	0	2	0	0	0
70	FW	(Saudi Arabia)	Mohammed Al-Saiari	17	5	5+5	4	1+1	0	0	0	1+4	1
77	MF	(Saudi Arabia)	Ibrahim Al-Telhi	10	0	1+6	0	1+1	0	0+1	0	0	0
80	MF	(Saudi Arabia)	Abdulmajeed Al-Sawat	11	1	5+1	0	2+1	0	0	0	2	1

=== Goalscorers ===
Rank	No.	Pos	Nat	Name	Pro League	King Cup	Crown Prince Cup	Champions League	Total
1	19	FW	(France)	Alassane N'Diaye	3	2	0	2	7
2	4	DF	(Portugal)	Ricardo Machado	3	2	0	1	6
3	9	FW	(Morocco)	Mounir El Hamdaoui	5	0	0	0	5
3	27	MF	(Saudi Arabia)	Saeed Al-Dossari	4	1	0	0	5
3	70	FW	(Saudi Arabia)	Mohammed Al-Saiari	4	0	0	1	5
6	49	MF	(Saudi Arabia)	Ahmed Al-Zain	3	0	1	0	4
7	10	MF	(Syria)	Jehad Al-Hussain	2	0	0	1	3
8	7	FW	(Saudi Arabia)	Mousa Al-Shameri	1	0	1	0	2
8	11	FW	(Saudi Arabia)	Saqer Otaif	2	0	0	0	2
8	16	DF	(Saudi Arabia)	Naif Al-Mousa	2	0	0	0	2
11	5	DF	(Saudi Arabia)	Talal Al-Absi	0	0	0	1	1
11	18	MF	(Saudi Arabia)	Madallah Al-Olayan	1	0	0	0	1
11	29	MF	(Romania)	Lucian Sânmărtean	0	1	0	0	1
11	55	MF	(Brazil)	Sandro Manoel	1	0	0	0	1
11	80	MF	(Saudi Arabia)	Abdulmajeed Al-Sawat	0	0	0	1	1
Own goal					2	0	1	0	3
Total					33	6	3	7	49

Last Updated: 13 May 2017

=== Clean sheets ===
Rank	No.	Pos	Nat	Name	Pro League	King Cup	Crown Prince Cup	Champions League	Total
1	22	GK	(Saudi Arabia)	Fahad Al-Shammari	7	0	0	1	8
2	23	GK	(Saudi Arabia)	Sultan Al-Ghamdi	1	2	0	1	4
Total					8	2	0	2	12

Last Updated: 20 April 2017
