= 2017–18 Al-Taawoun FC season =

Al-Taawoun
2017–18 season
- President: Mohammed Al-Qasim
- Manager: José Gomes
- Stadium: King Abdullah Sport City Stadium
- SPL: 9th
- Crown Prince Cup: Round of 16
- King Cup: Round of 32
- Top goalscorer: League: Abdulmajeed Al-Sawat (5); All: Abdulmajeed Al-Sawat (5)
- Highest home attendance: 8,084 vs Al-Hilal (15 August 2017)
- Lowest home attendance: 2,877 vs Al-Faisaly (20 October 2017)
- Average home league attendance: 4,772
- All statistics correct as of 14 November 2017.

The 2017–18 Al-Taawoun season is the club's 62nd season in existence and its 10th (non-consecutive) season in the top tier of Saudi Arabian football. This season, Al-Taawoun is participating in the Pro League for the eighth consecutive season as well as the King Cup and Crown Prince Cup. The season covers the period from 1 July 2017 to 30 June 2018.

== Pre-season friendlies ==
11 July 2017 Friendly	Al-Taawoun (Saudi Arabia)	3–3	(Saudi Arabia) Al-Batin	Buraidah, Saudi Arabia
19:40 AST	Kamara 56'; Amissi 58', 71'		Al-Jouei 4'; Jorge Santos 33'; Jhonnattann 40'	Stadium: Al-Taawoun Club Stadium

16 July 2017 Friendly	Adanaspor (Turkey)	0–1	(Saudi Arabia) Al-Taawoun	Bolu, Turkey
15:00 FET		Report	Kamara 34'	Stadium: Highland Sports Complex

19 July 2017 Friendly	Sivasspor (Turkey)	4–1	(Saudi Arabia) Al-Taawoun	Bolu, Turkey
18:00 FET	Yandaş 5'; Mutlu 40'; Keleş 52'; Leandrinho 88'	Report	Kamara 85'	Stadium: Highland Sports Complex

22 July 2017 Friendly	Uzbekistan	1–0	(Saudi Arabia) Al-Taawoun	Bolu, Turkey
17:30 FET	30'			Stadium: Highland Sports Complex

28 July 2017 Friendly	Sumgayit (Azerbaijan)	1–0	(Saudi Arabia) Al-Taawoun	Bolu, Turkey
17:30 FET	Imamverdiyev 4'	Report		Stadium: Highland Sports Complex

29 July 2017 Friendly	İstanbulspor (Turkey)	1–5	(Saudi Arabia) Al-Taawoun	Bolu, Turkey
15:30 FET	50' (pen.)	Report	Kamara 15', 42' (pen.); Al-Hussain 62', 75'; Amissi 86'	Stadium: Highland Sports Complex

4 August 2017 Friendly	Al-Taawoun (Saudi Arabia)	1–2	(Saudi Arabia) Al-Tai	Buraidah, Saudi Arabia
19:30 AST	Al-Hussain 36'	Report	Al-Enezi 6'; 69' (o.g.)	Stadium: Al-Taawoun Club Stadium

25 August 2017 Friendly	Al-Taawoun (Saudi Arabia)	1–0	(Saudi Arabia) Al-Ettifaq	Buraidah, Saudi Arabia
17:45 AST	Hazazi 43'	Report		Stadium: King Abdullah Sport City Stadium

28 August 2017 Friendly	Al-Taawoun (Saudi Arabia)	2–0	(Saudi Arabia) Al-Hazem	Buraidah, Saudi Arabia
19:15 AST	Hazazi 11' (pen.); Amissi 64'	Report		Stadium: King Abdullah Sport City Stadium

== Players ==
=== First team squad ===
- This section lists players who were in Al-Taawoun's first team squad at any point during the 2017–18 season
- Asterisks indicates player left mid-season
- Hash symbol indicates player retired mid-season
- Italics indicate loan player

No.	Nationality	Name	Position	Joined	Signed from
Goalkeepers
1	(Egypt)	Essam El-Hadary	GK	2017	(Egypt) Wadi Degla
21	(Saudi Arabia)	Moataz Al-Baqaawi	GK	2017	Youth
23	(Saudi Arabia)	Sultan Al-Ghamdi	GK	2015	Youth
32	(Saudi Arabia)	Fayz Al-Sabiay	GK	2015	(Saudi Arabia) Al-Hilal
Defenders
4	(Portugal)	Ricardo Machado	CB	2015	(Romania) Dinamo București
5	(Saudi Arabia)	Talal Al-Absi	CB	2015	(Saudi Arabia) Al-Ittihad
12	(Saudi Arabia)	Abdulaziz Al-Moghir	RB	2017	Youth
13	(Saudi Arabia)	Ibrahim Al-Zubaidi	LB	2016	(Saudi Arabia) Najran
16	(Saudi Arabia)	Naif Al-Mousa	LB / LM	2014	(Saudi Arabia) Al-Hazm
24	(Saudi Arabia)	Rayan Al-Dhiyab	CB / LB	2017	Youth
28	(Saudi Arabia)	Abdullah Al-Shameri	LB / CB	2013	Youth
34	(Saudi Arabia)	Faisel Al-Kharaa	RB	2017	(Saudi Arabia) Al-Ittihad
99	(Saudi Arabia)	Jufain Al-Bishi	CB	2017	(Saudi Arabia) Al-Raed
Midfielders
6	(Saudi Arabia)	Ryan Al-Mousa	DM / CB	2017	(Saudi Arabia) Al-Ahli
10	(Syria)	Jehad Al-Hussain	AM / SS	2014	(United Arab Emirates) Dubai
11	(Saudi Arabia)	Abdulaziz Al-Bishi	AM / LM	2017	(Saudi Arabia) Al-Shabab
17	(Burundi)	Cédric Amissi	LM / SS	2017	(Portugal) União
18	(Saudi Arabia)	Madallah Al-Olayan	DM / RB	2012	Youth
20	(Saudi Arabia)	Faisel Al-Rashodi	LM / AM	2017	Youth
27	(Saudi Arabia)	Saeed Al-Dossari	RM / RB	2016	(Saudi Arabia) Al-Shabab
30	(Egypt)	Mostafa Fathi	RM / LM	2017	(Egypt) El-Zamalek
37	(Saudi Arabia)	Abdulaziz Al-Sharid	CM / DM	2016	(Saudi Arabia) Al-Hilal
39	(Saudi Arabia)	Abdurahman Al-Dossari	DM	2017	(Saudi Arabia) Al-Nassr
77	(Saudi Arabia)	Abdurahman Khairallah	RM	2017	(Saudi Arabia) Al-Shabab
80	(Saudi Arabia)	Abdulmajeed Al-Sawat	AM / RM	2017	(Saudi Arabia) Al-Hilal
Forwards
9	(Saudi Arabia)	Naif Hazazi	CF	2017	(Saudi Arabia) Al-Nassr
45	(Sierra Leone)	Alhaji Kamara	CF	2017	(United States) D.C. United
70	(Saudi Arabia)	Ismael Al-Maghrebi	CF / LM	2017	(Saudi Arabia) Al-Shabab

== Transfers ==
=== Transfers in ===
Date	Position	Nationality	Name	From	Fee	Ref.
1 July 2017	DF	(Saudi Arabia)	Jufain Al-Bishi	Al-Raed	Free transfer	
1 July 2017	MF	(Saudi Arabia)	Abdulmajeed Al-Sawat	Al-Hilal	Free transfer	
1 July 2017	FW	(Sierra Leone)	Alhaji Kamara	D.C. United	£200,000	
1 July 2017	GK	(Egypt)	Essam El-Hadary	Wadi Degla SC	Free transfer	
1 July 2017	MF	(Burundi)	Cédric Amissi	União	Undisclosed	
12 July 2017	FW	(Saudi Arabia)	Ismael Al-Maghrebi	Al-Shabab	Free transfer	
20 August 2017	FW	(Saudi Arabia)	Naif Hazazi	Al-Nassr	Free transfer	

=== Transfers out ===
Date	Position	Nationality	Name	To	Fee	Ref.
1 July 2017	DF	(Saudi Arabia)	Abdullah Kanno	Al-Fayha	Undisclosed	
1 July 2017	FW	(Saudi Arabia)	Saqer Otaif	Al-Raed	Free transfer	
1 July 2017	MF	(Saudi Arabia)	Ahmed Al-Zain	Al-Ahli	Undisclosed	
1 July 2017	MF	(Saudi Arabia)	Abdulrahman Al-Barakah	Al-Fayha	Undisclosed	
1 July 2017	MF	(Romania)	Lucian Sânmărtean	Unattached	Released	
4 July 2017	DF	(Saudi Arabia)	Mahmoud Muaaz	Al-Wehda	Free transfer	
6 July 2017	FW	(France)	Alassane N'Diaye	Clermont Foot	Free transfer	
14 July 2017	DF	(Saudi Arabia)	Safwan Hawsawi	Unattached	Released	
3 August 2017	GK	(Saudi Arabia)	Fahad Al-Shammari	Al-Fayha	Free transfer	
16 August 2017	MF	(Saudi Arabia)	Ibrahim Al-Telhi	Najran	Free transfer	
9 September 2017	FW	(Saudi Arabia)	Mousa Al-Shameri	Al-Orobah	Free transfer	

=== Loans in ===
Date from	Date until	Position	Nationality	Name	From
1 July 2017	30 June 2018	DF	(Saudi Arabia)	Faisel Al-Kharaa	(Saudi Arabia) Al-Ittihad
4 July 2017	30 June 2018	MF	(Egypt)	Mostafa Fathi	(Egypt) El-Zamalek
9 July 2017	30 June 2018	MF	(Saudi Arabia)	Ryan Al-Mousa	(Saudi Arabia) Al-Ahli
23 August 2017	30 June 2018	MF	(Saudi Arabia)	Abdurahman Al-Dossari	(Saudi Arabia) Al-Nassr
11 September 2017	30 June 2018	MF	(Saudi Arabia)	Abdulaziz Al-Bishi	(Saudi Arabia) Al-Shabab
11 September 2017	30 June 2018	MF	(Saudi Arabia)	Abdurahman Khairallah	(Saudi Arabia) Al-Shabab

=== Loans out ===
Date from	Date until	Position	Nationality	Name	To
3 August 2017	30 June 2018	MF	(Brazil)	Sandro Manoel	(Saudi Arabia) Al-Fateh

== Competitions ==
=== Overall ===
Competition	Started round	Current position / round	Final position / round	First match	Last match
Professional League	—	6th	—	11 August 2017	May 2018
Crown Prince Cup	Round of 16			9 September 2017	
King Cup	Round of 32	Round of 32	—	January 2018	—

=== Pro League ===
==== League table ====
Pos	Team	Pld	W	D	L	GF	GA	GD	Pts	Qualification or relegation
5	Al-Fateh	26	9	9	8	34	39	−5	36 (Note: Al-Ettifaq finished ahead of Al-Fateh on head-to-head points: Al-Ettifaq 2–1 Al-Fateh, Al-Fateh 1–1 Al-Ettifaq)	
6	Al-Faisaly	26	9	8	9	39	33	+6	35	
7	Al-Taawoun	26	9	7	10	43	36	+7	34 (Note: Al-Taawoun finished ahead of Al-Fayha on head-to-head points: Al-Fayha 1–1 Al-Taawoun, Al-Taawoun 4–0 Al-Fayha)	
8	Al-Fayha	26	8	10	8	36	40	−4	34	
9	Al-Ittihad	26	8	9	9	34	41	−7	33	Qualification to AFC Champions League group stage (Note: Al-Ittihad qualified for the AFC Champions League group stage as 2018 King Cup winners.)

Updated to match(es) played on 12 April 2018. Source: slstat.com
Rules for classification: 1) Points; 2) Head-to-head points; 3) Head-to-head goal difference; 4) Total goal difference; 5) Total goals scored; 6) Play-off (only for deciding champion, relegation and AFC competitions participation).

==== Results summary ====
Overall								Home						Away					
Pld	W	D	L	GF	GA	GD	Pts	W	D	L	GF	GA	GD	W	D	L	GF	GA	GD
11	3	4	4	18	16	+2	13	2	1	2	9	8	+1	1	3	2	9	8	+1

Last updated: 25 November 2017.
Source: Competitive matches

==== Results by round ====
Round	1	2	3	4	5	6	7	8	9	10	11	12	13	14	15	16	17	18	19	20	21	22	23	24	25	26
Ground	A	H	A	A	H	A	H	H	A	H	A	A	H	H	A	H	H	A	H	A	A	H	A	H	H	A
Result	W	L	D	D	L	L	W	W	L	D	D															
Position	1	6	7	9	10	10	7	7	9	9	7															

Updated to match(es) played on 25 November 2017. Source: Competitive matches
A = Away; H = Home; W = Win; D = Draw; L = Loss

==== Matches ====
All times are local, AST (UTC+3).

Win Draw Loss Postponed

10 August 2017 1	Al-Fateh	1–4	Al-Taawoun	Al-Hasa
19:00	Hazzazi (yellow card) 45+5'; Al-Mousa (yellow card) 61'; Al-Zaqaan 81'; Al-Dawsari (yellow card) 87'	Report	Fathi 20'; Amissi 57'; Al-Sawat 59', 85'	Stadium: Prince Abdullah bin Jalawi Stadium; Attendance: 1,814; Referee: Sultan Al-Harbi

15 August 2017 2	Al-Taawoun	3–4	Al-Hilal	Buraidah
20:50	Kamara 26'; Fathi 35'; Al-Shameri 45+1'; Al-Mousa (yellow card) 83'; Amissi (yellow card) 90+3'	Report	Kharbin 14'; Al-Abed (yellow card) 19'; Al-Breik 21'; Carlos Eduardo 38', 56'; Al-Hafith (yellow card) 76'; Hawsawi (yellow card) 82'; Jahfali (yellow card) 90'; Al-Dawsari (yellow card) 90+4'	Stadium: King Abdullah Sport City Stadium; Attendance: 8,084; Referee: Mohammed Al-Hoaish

16 September 2017 3	Al-Fayha	1–1	Al-Taawoun	Al Majma'ah
18:40	Tziolis (yellow card) 37'; Tombakti (yellow card) 51'; Al-Khaibari (yellow card) 65'; Asprilla 65', (yellow card) 69'; Ruiz (yellow card) 86'; Al-Mutairi (yellow card) 90+1'	Report	Hazazi (yellow card) 45'; Amissi (yellow card) 69', (goal) 87'; Al-Zubaidi (yellow card) 86'	Stadium: King Salman Sport City Stadium; Attendance: 839; Referee: Faisal Al-Blwi

23 September 2017 4	Al-Raed	2–2	Al-Taawoun	Buraidah
20:20	Al-Rashidi (yellow card) 8'; Bangoura 11' (54), pen.' Amora (yellow card) 19'; Otaif (yellow card) 55'; Al-Rashidi (yellow card) 90+8'	Report	Amissi (yellow card) 8'; Al-Maghrebi 22'; Al-Mousa (yellow card) 63'; Hazazi 74' (pen.); Machado (yellow card) 90+3'; Al-Hussain (yellow card) 90+8'	Stadium: King Abdullah Sport City Stadium; Attendance: 17,003; Referee: Szymon Marciniak (Poland)

28 September 2017 5	Al-Taawoun	1–2	Al-Ittihad	Buraidah
20:15	Al-Sawat 47'	Report	Al Ansari 19'; Al-Sumairi (yellow card) 38'; Kahraba 52'	Stadium: King Abdullah Sport City Stadium; Attendance: 5,004; Referee: Abdulrahman Al-Sultan

15 October 2017 6	Al-Nassr	2–1	Al-Taawoun	Riyadh
20:00	Lagrou (yellow card) 36'; Leonardo 38', 51'; Al-Jumaiah (yellow card) 72'	Report	Al-Shameri (yellow card) 10'; Kamara 43'	Stadium: King Fahd International Stadium; Attendance: 1,915; Referee: Shukri Al-Hanfosh

20 October 2017 7	Al-Taawoun	1–0	Al-Faisaly	Buraidah
19:55	Al-Zubaidi (yellow card) 69'; Al-Mousa 88'	Report	Luisinho (yellow card) 45'; Hyland (yellow card) 50'; Al-Deayea (yellow card) 79'; Al-Dossari (yellow card) 90+4'	Stadium: King Abdullah Sport City Stadium; Attendance: 2,877; Referee: Abdullah Al-Nuhait

27 October 2017 8	Al-Taawoun	3–1	Ohod	Buraidah
19:50	Al-Sawat 3', 62'; Kamara 50'; Al-Hussain (yellow card) 59'	Report	Hawsawi 60'	Stadium: King Abdullah Sport City Stadium; Attendance: 3,121; Referee: Fahad Al-Mirdasi

3 November 2017 9	Al-Qadsiah	1–0	Al-Taawoun	Dammam
17:35	Al-Obaid (yellow card) 10'; Stanley (yellow card) 26'; Mothnani (yellow card) 51'; Élton 65'; Fatau (yellow card) 79'	Report	Al-Mousa (yellow card) 64'	Stadium: Prince Mohamed bin Fahd Stadium; Attendance: 574; Referee: Arnold Hunter (Northern Ireland)

19 November 2017 10	Al-Taawoun	1–1	Al-Ahli	Buraidah
19:40	Al-Mousa (yellow card) 55'; Amissi 63'	Report	Al-Somah 3'; Balghaith (yellow card) 39'; Bakshween (yellow card) 45'; Claudemir (yellow card) 57'	Stadium: King Abdullah Sport City Stadium; Attendance: 4,372; Referee: Szymon Marciniak (Poland)

25 November 2017 11	Al-Batin	1–1	Al-Taawoun	Hafar al-Batin
15:05	Khodari (yellow card) 19'; Obaid (yellow card) 45'; Tarabai 90+3'; Eisa (yellow card) 90+4'	Report	Al-Bishi 51'; Al-Maghrebi (yellow card) 64'; Hazazi (yellow card) 80'	Stadium: Al-Batin Club Stadium; Attendance: 1,217; Referee: Thorvaldur Árnason (Iceland)

30 November 2017 12	Al-Shabab	v	Al-Taawoun	Riyadh
17:45		Report		Stadium: Prince Faisal bin Fahd Stadium

10 December 2017 13	Al-Taawoun	v	Al-Ettifaq	Buraidah
17:50		Report		Stadium: King Abdullah Sport City Stadium

16 December 2017 14	Al-Taawoun	v	Al-Fateh	Buraidah
15:15		Report		Stadium: King Abdullah Sport City Stadium

24 December 2017 15	Al-Hilal	v	Al-Taawoun	Riyadh
19:45		Report		Stadium: Prince Faisal bin Fahd Stadium

29 December 2017 16	Al-Taawoun	v	Al-Fayha	Buraidah
15:20		Report		Stadium: King Abdullah Sport City Stadium

12 January 2018 17	Al-Taawoun	v	Al-Raed	Buraidah
18:15		Report		Stadium: King Abdullah Sport City Stadium

18 January 2018 18	Al-Ittihad	v	Al-Taawoun	Jeddah
20:05		Report		Stadium: King Abdullah Sports City

27 January 2018 19	Al-Taawoun	v	Al-Nassr	Buraidah
15:40		Report		Stadium: King Abdullah Sport City Stadium

31 January 2018 20	Al-Faisaly	v	Al-Taawoun	Al Majma'ah
15:40		Report		Stadium: King Salman Sport City Stadium

=== Crown Prince Cup ===
All times are local, AST (UTC+3).

9 September 2016 Round of 16	Al-Fayha	1–0	Al-Taawoun	Al Majma'ah
18:50	Asprilla 13'; Tombakti (yellow card) 28'; Al-Mutairi (yellow card) 51'	Report	Al-Mousa (yellow card) 52'; Al-Zubaidi (yellow card) 89'	Stadium: King Salman Sport City Stadium; Attendance: 791; Referee: Abdullah Al-Nuhait

=== King Cup ===
Al-Taawoun will enter the King Cup in the Round of 32 alongside the other Pro League teams.

== Statistics ==
=== Squad statistics ===
As of 25 November 2017.

No.	Pos	Nat	Player	Total		Pro League		King Cup		Crown Prince Cup	
No.	Pos	Nat	Player	Apps	Goals	Apps	Goals	Apps	Goals	Apps	Goals
1	GK	(Egypt)	Essam El-Hadary	12	0	11	0	0	0	1	0
4	DF	(Portugal)	Ricardo Machado	5	0	4	0	0	0	1	0
5	DF	(Saudi Arabia)	Talal Al-Absi	1	0	1	0	0	0	0	0
6	MF	(Saudi Arabia)	Ryan Al-Mousa	10	0	9	0	0	0	1	0
9	FW	(Saudi Arabia)	Naif Hazazi	6	1	2+3	1	0	0	1	0
10	MF	(Syria)	Jehad Al-Hussain	12	0	10+1	0	0	0	1	0
11	MF	(Saudi Arabia)	Abdulaziz Al-Bishi	8	0	4+4	0	0	0	0	0
12	DF	(Saudi Arabia)	Abdulaziz Al-Moghir	0	0	0	0	0	0	0	0
13	DF	(Saudi Arabia)	Ibrahim Al-Zubaidi	8	0	7	0	0	0	1	0
16	DF	(Saudi Arabia)	Naif Al-Mousa	11	1	7+3	1	0	0	0+1	0
17	MF	(Burundi)	Cédric Amissi	11	3	10	3	0	0	1	0
18	MF	(Saudi Arabia)	Madallah Al-Olayan	8	0	7+1	0	0	0	0	0
20	MF	(Saudi Arabia)	Faisel Al-Rashodi	0	0	0	0	0	0	0	0
21	GK	(Saudi Arabia)	Moataz Al-Baqaawi	0	0	0	0	0	0	0	0
23	GK	(Saudi Arabia)	Sultan Al-Ghamdi	0	0	0	0	0	0	0	0
24	DF	(Saudi Arabia)	Rayan Al-Dhiyab	0	0	0	0	0	0	0	0
27	MF	(Saudi Arabia)	Saeed Al-Dossari	9	0	5+3	0	0	0	1	0
28	DF	(Saudi Arabia)	Abdullah Al-Shameri	11	1	10	1	0	0	1	0
30	MF	(Egypt)	Mostafa Fathi	5	2	4+1	2	0	0	0	0
32	GK	(Saudi Arabia)	Fayz Al-Sabiay	0	0	0	0	0	0	0	0
34	DF	(Saudi Arabia)	Faisel Al-Kharaa	0	0	0	0	0	0	0	0
37	MF	(Saudi Arabia)	Abdulaziz Al-Sharid	1	0	0+1	0	0	0	0	0
39	MF	(Saudi Arabia)	Abdurahman Al-Dossari	9	0	5+3	0	0	0	1	0
45	FW	(Sierra Leone)	Alhaji Kamara	8	3	6+2	3	0	0	0	0
70	FW	(Saudi Arabia)	Ismael Al-Maghrebi	10	1	3+6	1	0	0	0+1	0
77	MF	(Saudi Arabia)	Abdurahman Khairallah	1	0	0+1	0	0	0	0	0
80	MF	(Saudi Arabia)	Abdulmajeed Al-Sawat	12	5	9+2	5	0	0	1	0
99	DF	(Saudi Arabia)	Jufain Al-Bishi	9	1	8+1	1	0	0	0	0

=== Goalscorers ===
Rank	No.	Pos	Nat	Name	Pro League	King Cup	Crown Prince Cup	Total
1	80	MF	(Saudi Arabia)	Abdulmajeed Al-Sawat	5	0	0	5
2	17	MF	(Burundi)	Cédric Amissi	3	0	0	3
2	45	FW	(Sierra Leone)	Alhaji Kamara	3	0	0	3
4	30	MF	(Egypt)	Mostafa Fathi	2	0	0	2
5	9	FW	(Saudi Arabia)	Naif Hazazi	1	0	0	1
5	16	DF	(Saudi Arabia)	Naif Al-Mousa	1	0	0	1
5	28	DF	(Saudi Arabia)	Abdullah Al-Shameri	1	0	0	1
5	70	FW	(Saudi Arabia)	Ismael Al-Maghrebi	1	0	0	1
5	99	DF	(Saudi Arabia)	Jufain Al-Bishi	1	0	0	1
Own goal					0	0	0	0
Total					18	0	0	18

Last Updated: 25 November 2017

=== Clean sheets ===
Rank	No.	Pos	Nat	Name	Pro League	King Cup	Crown Prince Cup	Total
1	1	GK	(Egypt)	Essam El-Hadary	1	0	0	1
Total					1	0	0	1

Last Updated: 20 October 2017
