= 2017 King's Cup (Saudi Arabia) =

2017 King Cup
Tournament details
- Country: Saudi Arabia
- Dates: 18 January – 18 May 2017
- Teams: 32

Final positions
- Champions: Al-Hilal
- Runners-up: Al-Ahli

Tournament statistics
- Matches played: 31
- Goals scored: 108 (3.48 per match)
- Top goal scorer(s): Omar Kharbin (5 goals)
- All statistics correct as of 18 May 2017.

The 2017 King Cup, or The Custodian of the Two Holy Mosques Cup, was the 42nd edition of the King Cup since its establishment in 1957, and the 10th under the current format. It started on 18 January and concluded with the final on 18 May 2017. The winner qualifies for the 2018 AFC Champions League group stage.

Al-Hilal won their eighth title after a 3–2 win over defending champions Al-Ahli in the final on 18 May 2017.

The winner of the King Cup earns automatic qualification to the 2018 AFC Champions League group stage. However, as Al-Hilal qualified for the AFC Champions League via winning the league, Al-Nassr, the highest placed team in the 2016–17 Saudi Professional League not already qualified took the group stage spot.

== Participating teams ==
A total of 32 teams participated in this season. 14 teams from the Professional league, 15 teams from the First Division, and 3 teams qualifying from the preliminary stage. Al-Hazem were excluded from participating this season after they withdrew from the competition last year.

League	Teams
Pro league	Al-Ahli ^{TH}; Al-Batin; Al-Ettifaq; Al-Faisaly; Al-Fateh; Al-Hilal; Al-Ittihad; Al-Khaleej; Al-Nassr; Al-Qadisiyah; Al-Raed; Al-Shabab; Al-Taawoun; Al-Wehda
1st Division	Al-Adalh; Al-Feiha; Al-Jeel; Al-Nahda; Al-Nojoom; Al-Orobah; Al-Qaisumah; Al-Shoulla; Al-Tai; Al-Watani; Damac; Hajer; Najran; Ohod; Wej
Second Division	Al-Ain; Al-Jabalain; Al-Safa

== Bracket ==
Round of 32
H	Al-Ahli	2
A	Al-Shoulla	1
A	Al-Qadisiyah	4
H	Al-Safa	0
H	Hajer	2
A	Al-Orobah	1
A	Al-Shabab	0
H	Wej	1
H	Al-Khaleej	8
A	Al-Ain	1
H	Al-Faisaly	3
A	Al-Jeel	2
A	Al-Batin	2
H	Al-Adalh	3
A	Al-Ittihad	1
H	Al-Tai (aet)	2
A	Al-Taawoun	1
H	Al-Nojoom	0
H	Al-Raed	3
A	Al-Jabalain	0
A	Al-Ettifaq	2
H	Damac	0
H	Al-Fateh	2
A	Al-Watani	1
H	Al-Nassr	4
A	Al-Feiha	0
A	Najran	0
H	Al-Nahda	1
A	Al-Wehda	1
H	Ohod	0
H	Al-Hilal	2
A	Al-Qaisumah	1

Round of 16
A	Al-Ahli	3
H	Al-Qadisiyah	1
A	Hajer	1
H	Wej	3
A	Al-Khaleej	1
H	Al-Faisaly	2
H	Al-Adalh	4
A	Al-Tai	3
A	Al-Taawoun	1
H	Al-Raed	0
H	Al-Ettifaq	1
A	Al-Fateh	0
A	Al-Nassr	2
H	Al-Nahda	0
A	Al-Wehda	2
H	Al-Hilal	3

Quarter-finals
H	Al-Ahli	6
A	Wej	0
H	Al-Faisaly	2
A	Al-Adalh	1
A	Al-Taawoun	2 (p)
H	Al-Ettifaq	2
H	Al-Nassr	0
A	Al-Hilal	2

Semi-finals
A	Al-Ahli	3
H	Al-Faisaly	0
A	Al-Taawoun	3
H	Al-Hilal	4

Final
–	Al-Ahli	2
–	Al-Hilal	3

Note: H: Home team, A: Away team

source: SAFF

== Round of 32 ==
The Round of 32 matches were played between 18 and 21 January 2017. All times are local, AST (UTC+3).

18 January 2017 7	Al-Adalh (2)	3–2	Al-Batin (1)	Al-Hasa
15:20	Al-Zowayed 9', 47'; Abdoh Jaber 70'	Report	Obaid 33'; Dakheel 53'	Stadium: Prince Abdullah bin Jalawi Stadium; Attendance: 240; Referee: Mishari Al-Mishari

18 January 2017 11	Damac (2)	0–2	Al-Ettifaq (1)	Abha
15:55		Report	Koffi 32'; Kanno 66'	Stadium: Prince Sultan bin Abdul Aziz Stadium; Attendance: 710; Referee: Ahmed Al-Remeikhany

18 January 2017 16	Al-Hilal (1)	2–1	Al-Qaisumah (2)	Riyadh
18:10	Al-Dawsari 66'; Sharahili (yellow card) 74'; Al-Qahtani 78'	Report	Diop 45+1'	Stadium: Prince Faisal bin Fahd Stadium; Referee: Abdullah Al-Nahet

18 January 2017 15	Ohod (2)	0–1	Al-Wehda (1)	Medinah
20:00		Report	Belal 15'	Stadium: Prince Mohammed bin Abdul Aziz Stadium; Referee: Mohammed Al-Smail

19 January 2017 3	Hajer (2)	2–1	Al-Orobah (2)	Al-Hasa
15:20	Al-Hamdan 1'; Al-Otaibi (yellow card) 14'; Al-Khalaf 45+2'	Report	Al-Johani (yellow card) 7'; Al-Joni (yellow card) 63', (goal) 76'	Stadium: Prince Abdullah bin Jalawi Stadium; Referee: Faisal Al-Balawi

19 January 2017 4	Wej (2)	1–0	Al-Shabab (1)	Ta'if
15:40	Voinea 9'; Hussain (yellow card) 13'; Al-Thowaibi (yellow card) 70'; Al-Mosaabi (yellow card) 77'	Report	Otaif (yellow card) 61'; Kariri (yellow card) 90+2'	Stadium: King Fahd Stadium; Referee: Mamdouh Assiri

19 January 2017 14	Al-Nahda (2)	1–0	Najran (2)	Dammam
17:55	Al-Juraibi (yellow card) 78'; Al-Malki 90+3'	Report	Majrashi (yellow card) 66'; Maqbol (yellow card) 90+3'	Stadium: Prince Mohamed bin Fahd Stadium; Referee: Hussain Abo Shahen

20 January 2017 6	Al-Faisaly (1)	3–2	Al-Jeel (2)	Al Majma'ah
15:35	Everaldo 20' (pen.); Rossi (yellow card) 29'; Luisinho 31'; Maloča (yellow card) 38'; Majrashi 82'; Al-Bishi (yellow card) 86'	Report	da Silva 19'; Housah 23'	Stadium: King Salman Sport City Stadium; Referee: Mohammed Al-Beredi

20 January 2017 8	Al-Tai (2)	2–1 (a.e.t.)	Al-Ittihad (1)	Ha'il
15:50	Al-Sabah (yellow card) 53'; Al-Shammeri 92'; Al-Heji 94'; Al-Dossari (yellow card) 120+2'	Report	Assiri (yellow card) 18'; Al-Aryani 99'	Stadium: Prince Abdul Aziz bin Musa'ed Stadium; Referee: Abdalah Al-Awidan

20 January 2017 9	Al-Nojoom (2)	0–1	Al-Taawoun (1)	Al-Hasa
17:55	Al-Ahmed (yellow card) 12'	Report	Machado 90+2'	Stadium: Prince Abdullah bin Jalawi Stadium; Referee: Fahad Al-Nawaf

20 January 2017 2	Al-Safa (3)	0–4	Al-Qadisiyah (1)	Khobar
19:15	Okhaik (yellow card) 20'; Al-Hani (yellow card) 44'	Report	Eze 20' (pen.), 47', 87'; Al-Amri (yellow card) 43'; Jaafari (yellow card) 83'; Abo Shararah 90+2'	Stadium: Prince Saud bin Jalawi Stadium; Referee: Ahmed Al-Tayar

20 January 2017 1	Al-Ahli (1)	2–1	Al-Shoulla (2)	Jeddah
20:10	Al-Moasher 15'; Al-Mowalad (yellow card) 87'; Al-Mogahwi 90+5'	Report	Al-Dossari 50'; Al-Balawi (yellow card) 81'; Al-Sobeai (yellow card) 90+3'	Stadium: King Abdullah Sports City; Referee: Sami Al-Jires

21 January 2017 12	Al-Fateh (1)	2–1	Al-Watani (2)	Al-Hasa
15:20	Al-Bulaihi (yellow card) 34'; Ukra 69' (pen.); Al-Juahaim (yellow card) 73'; Nathan Júnior 76'; Al-Mazyadei (yellow card) 82'	Report	Al-Yamani (yellow card) 34'; Al-Balawi 48', (yellow card) 72'	Stadium: Prince Abdullah bin Jalawi Stadium; Referee: Fahad Al-Oraini

21 January 2017 10	Al-Raed (1)	3–0	Al-Jabalain (3)	Buraidah
15:40	Bangoura 14', 19', 62' (pen.); Amora (yellow card) 38'; Alves (yellow card) 71'; Al-Ayyaf (yellow card) 90+3'	Report	Al-Anqari (yellow card) 59'; Al-Shammari (yellow card) 69'; Al-Ruwaili (yellow card) 77'	Stadium: King Abdullah Sport City Stadium; Referee: Abdulrahman Al-Shehri

21 January 2017 5	Al-Khaleej (1)	8–1	Al-Ain (3)	Khobar
17:55	Al-Salem 8', 63'; Majrashi 14', 53'; Bokhari 24', (yellow card) 57'; Al-Lawjami 34'; Jandson 78', 84'	Report	Eid (yellow card) 68'; Al-Amri (yellow card) 75'; Al-Zahrani 90'	Stadium: Prince Saud bin Jalawi Stadium; Referee: Hassen Al-Habib

21 January 2017 13	Al-Nassr (1)	4–0	Al-Feiha (2)	Riyadh
18:10	Al-Ghamdi 15'; Tomečak 45+2'; Al-Najei 72'; Al-Sahlawi 90+1'	Report	Al-Khaibari (yellow card) 90'	Stadium: Prince Faisal bin Fahd Stadium; Referee: Raed Al-Zahrani

== Round of 16 ==
The Round of 16 matches were played between 23 January and 25 February 2017. All times are local, AST (UTC+3).

23 January 2017 24	Al-Hilal (1)	3–2	Al-Wehda (1)	Riyadh
18:15	Bonatini 16', 51'; Milesi (yellow card) 29'; Al-Qahtani 41' (pen.); Al-Abed (yellow card) 90+4'	Report	Haroon (yellow card) 33'; Al Baour (yellow card) 40'; Fallatah 65'; Al-Fahmi (yellow card) 75'; Al-Najar (yellow card) 77'; Al-Arraf (yellow card) 86'; Al-Faresi 87'	Stadium: Prince Faisal bin Fahd Stadium; Referee: Shukri Al-Hanfosh

7 February 2017 21	Al-Raed (1)	0–1	Al-Taawoun (1)	Buraidah
20:15	Al-Shammeri (yellow card) 70'; Al-Bishi (yellow card) 86'; Al-Mousa (yellow card) 90+2'	Report	Muaaz (yellow card) 62'; Al-Zubaidi (yellow card) 67'; Sânmărtean 87'	Stadium: King Abdullah Sport City Stadium; Referee: Arnold Hunter (Northern Ireland)

13 February 2017 17	Al-Qadisiyah (1)	1–3	Al-Ahli (1)	Khobar
20:15	Ferreira 22'; Al-Johani (yellow card) 88'; Barnawi (yellow card) 90'	Report	Al-Mogahwi 19'; Al-Somah 37'; Abdulamir 42' (pen.); Al-Harbi (yellow card) 59'	Stadium: Prince Saud bin Jalawi Stadium; Referee: Khaled Al-Teris

23 February 2017 23	Al-Nahda (2)	0–2	Al-Nassr (1)	Dammam
19:55	Al-Dhamri (yellow card) 37'; Sufyani (yellow card) 55'; Al-Ziyadi (yellow card) 90'; Al-Olayani (red card) 108'	Report	Ghaleb (yellow card) 79'; Hazazi 93', 97' (pen.), (yellow card) 110'	Stadium: Prince Mohamed bin Fahd Stadium; Referee: Faisal Al-Balawi

24 February 2017 18	Wej (2)	3–1	Hajer (2)	Ta'if
16:15	Al-Boqami (yellow card) 25'; Voinea 43'; Al-Qarni 65'; Al-Boqami 73'; Al-Towairqi (yellow card) 82'; Hussain (yellow card) 86'	Report	Al-Musained 16'	Stadium: King Fahd Stadium; Referee: Sami Al-Jires

24 February 2017 22	Al-Ettifaq (1)	1–0	Al-Fateh (1)	Dammam
19:55	Koffi (yellow card) 29'; Al-Nashi (yellow card) 32'; Al-Amri 43', (yellow card) 65'; Al-Kassar (yellow card) 90+2'	Report	Al-Dawsari (yellow card) 84'; Buhimed (yellow card) 90'	Stadium: Prince Mohamed bin Fahd Stadium; Referee: Raed Al-Zahrani

25 February 2017 20	Al-Adalh (2)	4–3	Al-Tai (2)	Al-Hasa
15:35	Al-Amer (yellow card) 30'; Al-Zowayed 40'; Al-Hafidh (yellow card) 45'; Al-Khamis 51'; Abker 75', (yellow card) 90+5'; Al-Jarrad 79' (o.g.); Bo Homail (yellow card) 81'	Report	Leo 41', 66'; Al-Shammeri 64', (yellow card) 75'; Al-Jarrad (yellow card) 74'; Al-Sabah (yellow card) 85'; Al-Dossari (yellow card) 90+1'	Stadium: Prince Abdullah bin Jalawi Stadium; Referee: Majid Al-Shamrani

25 February 2017 19	Al-Faisaly (1)	2–1	Al-Khaleej (1)	Al Majma'ah
18:40	Majrashi 25'; Al-Sowayed (yellow card) 83'; Luisinho 90+2'	Report	François 49'; Diakité (yellow card) 51'; Al-Shoalah (yellow card) 89'	Stadium: King Salman Sport City Stadium; Referee: Abdullah Al-Nahet

== Quarter-finals ==
The Quarter-finals matches were played between 30 March and 2 April 2017. All times are local, AST (UTC+3).

30 March 2017 27	Al-Ettifaq (1)	2–2 (a.e.t.) (3–5 p)	Al-Taawoun (1)	Dammam
20:15	Bouba 26'; Al-Hazaa 77'; Al-Dossari (yellow card) 104'	Report	Machado 19'; Al-Dossari 32'; Al-Saiari (yellow card) 90+2'; Kanno (yellow card) 120'	Stadium: Prince Mohamed bin Fahd Stadium; Attendance: 1,566; Referee: Khalid Al-Salawy
	Penalties
	Callejón (penalty missed); Al-Kwikbi (penalty scored); Al-Dossari (penalty scored); Bouba (penalty scored)		Machado (penalty scored); Al-Shameri (penalty scored); Al-Barakah (penalty scored); Al-Saiari (penalty scored); Sânmărtean (penalty scored)

31 March 2017 26	Al-Faisaly (1)	2–1	Al-Adalh (2)	Al Majma'ah
18:55	Luisinho 38'; Majrashi 83'	Report	Al-Mohanna 16'; Awaji (yellow card) 36'; Al-Qahtani (yellow card) 87'	Stadium: King Salman Sport City Stadium; Attendance: 9 Referee: Saleh Al Hazloul
Note: The match was abandoned after 24 minutes due to heavy rain, and was resumed on 1 April 2017, 19:15, from the point of abandonment.

1 April 2017 28	Al-Nassr (1)	0–2	Al-Hilal (1)	Riyadh
20:30	Ghaleb (yellow card) 54'	Report	Jahfali (yellow card) 24'; Milesi 80', (yellow card) 81'; Kharbin 90+1'	Stadium: King Fahd International Stadium; Attendance: 18,906; Referee: Damir Skomina (Slovenia)

2 April 2017 25	Al-Ahli (1)	6–0	Wej (2)	Jeddah
20:30	Al-Somah 28', 49'; Abdul-Amir 35'; Al-Jassim (yellow card) 41'; Al-Moasher 59'; Al-Mogahwi 69'; Fetfatzidis 71'; Bakshween (yellow card) 80'	Report	Al-Mowallad (yellow card) 45+2'; Barnawi (yellow card) 68'; Al-Shaeri (yellow card) 83'	Stadium: King Abdullah Sports City; Attendance: 20,177; Referee: Khaled Al-Teris

== Semi-finals ==
The four winners of the quarter-finals progressed to the semi-finals. The semi-finals were played on 12 and 13 May 2017. All times are local, AST (UTC+3).

12 May 2017
20:50

Al-Faisaly (1)	0–3	Al-Ahli (1)
	Report	Fetfatzidis 55'; Seraj 75', 81'; Balghaith (yellow card) 79'

King Salman Sport City Stadium, Al Majma'ah
Referee: Shoukri Al-Hanfoush
13 May 2017
20:30

Al-Hilal (1)	4–3	Al-Taawoun (1)
Kharbin 16', 46', 80'; Al-Hafith (yellow card) 28'; Al-Dawsari 62'	Report	N'Diaye 4', 90+4'; Al-Mousa (yellow card) 18'; Al-Olayan 76'

Prince Faisal bin Fahd Stadium, Riyadh
Referee: Ivan Bebek (Croatia)

== Final ==
The final was played on Thursday 18 May 2017 at King Abdullah Sports City.

18 May 2017
21:00 AST

Al-Ahli	2–3	Al-Hilal
Hawsawi 43'; Al-Somah 90+3' (pen.)	Report	Kharbin 28'; Jahfali 77'; Carlos Eduardo 88'

King Abdullah Sports City, Jeddah
Attendance: 54,563
Referee: Artur Soares Dias (Portugal)

== Top goalscorers ==
As of 18 May 2017

Rank	Player	Club	Goals
1	(Syria) Omar Kharbin	Al-Hilal	5
2	(Syria) Omar Al Somah	Al-Ahli	4
3	(Nigeria) Patrick Eze	Al-Qadisiyah	3
3	(Guinea) Ismaël Bangoura	Al-Raed	3
3	(Saudi Arabia) Jehad Al-Zowayed	Al-Adalh	3
3	(Brazil) Luisinho	Al-Faisaly	3
3	(Saudi Arabia) Mohammed Majrashi	Al-Faisaly	3
3	(Saudi Arabia) Housain Al-Mogahwi	Al-Ahli	3

Note: Players and teams marked in bold are still active in the competition.
