= Abdulrahman Al-Shammari =

Abdulrahman Al-Shammari may refer to:

- Abdulrahman Al-Shammari (footballer, born 1989), Saudi football right-back
- Abdulrahman Al-Shammari (footballer, born 1993), Kuwaiti football striker
