= Beckum =

Beckum may refer to:

- Beckum, Germany, a town in Germany
- Beckum, Overijssel, a village in the Netherlands
