= 2016–17 Saudi Pro League =

Professional League
- Season: 2016–17
- Champions: Al-Hilal
- Relegated: Al-Khaleej; Al-Wehda
- AFC Champions League: Al-Hilal; Al-Ahli
- Matches: 182
- Goals: 549 (3.02 per match)
- Top goalscorer: Omar Al Somah (24 goals)
- Biggest home win: Al-Hilal 6–0 Al-Wehda (8 December 2016)
- Biggest away win: Al-Khaleej 1–6 Al-Hilal (20 October 2016)
- Highest scoring: Al-Faisaly 3–6 Al-Ahli (1 December 2016)
- Longest winning run: 7 games Al-Ahli
- Longest unbeaten run: 19 games Al-Hilal
- Longest winless run: 11 games Al-Ettifaq
- Longest losing run: 6 games Al-Wehda
- Highest attendance: 59,174; Al-Hilal 5–1 Al-Nassr (4 May 2017)
- Lowest attendance: 63; Al-Qadsiah 1–1 Al-Batin (18 February 2017)
- Average attendance: 6,980
- All statistics correct as of 4 May 2017.

The 2016–17 Saudi Professional League (also known as the Jameel League for sponsorship reasons) was the 41st season of Saudi Pro League, the top Saudi professional league for association football clubs, since its inception in 1976. The season started on 11 August 2016 and concluded on 4 May 2017.

Al-Hilal won their fourteenth league title, and first since the 2010–11 season, with two matches to spare following a 2–1 win over Al-Shabab on 20 April. The defending champions were Al-Ahli who finished as runners-up.

Al-Ettifaq and Al-Batin entered as the two promoted teams from the 2015–16 Saudi First Division.

== Teams ==
The league comprises 14 teams, 11 from the 2015–16 campaign, as well as two teams promoted from the 2015–16 First Division and the relegation play-off winners.

On the final day of the season Al-Mojzel won the First Division title and their first-ever promotion to the top flight after a 3–2 win against Al-Jeel. Al-Ettifaq were also promoted after they finished in 2nd place, it would be their first participation in the Pro League since the 2013–14 season. The two promoted teams replaced Najran and Hajer. Al-Raed were relegation play-off winners.

On 3 August 2016, Al-Mojzel were stripped of their title and instead got relegated to the Second Division due to a match fixing scandal. The SAFF decided to promote Al-Batin instead.

=== Stadiums and locations ===
Locations of teams in the 2016–17 Saudi Professional League

Team	Home city	Stadium	Capacity
Al-Ahli	Jeddah	King Abdullah Sports City	62,000
Al-Batin	Hafar al-Batin	Al-Batin Club Stadium	6,000
Al-Ettifaq	Dammam	Prince Mohamed bin Fahd Stadium	21,701
Al-Faisaly	Harmah	King Salman Sport City Stadium (Al Majma'ah)	5,200
Al-Fateh	Al-Hasa	Prince Abdullah bin Jalawi Stadium	19,096
Al-Hilal	Riyadh	King Fahd International Stadium	62,685
Al-Ittihad	Jeddah	King Abdullah Sports City	62,000
Al-Khaleej	Saihat	Prince Saud bin Jalawi Stadium (Khobar)	11,000
Al-Nassr	Riyadh	King Fahd International Stadium	62,685
Al-Qadsiah	Khobar	Prince Saud bin Jalawi Stadium	11,000
Al-Raed	Buraidah	King Abdullah Sport City Stadium	23,600
Al-Shabab	Riyadh	King Fahd International Stadium	62,685
Al-Taawoun	Buraidah	King Abdullah Sport City Stadium	23,600
Al-Wehda	Makkah	King Abdul Aziz Stadium	33,195

Notes

1. Al-Hilal, Al-Nassr and Al-Shabab use Prince Faisal bin Fahd Stadium (22,500 seats) as home stadium.

=== Personnel and kits ===
Team	Manager	Captain	Kit manufacturer	Shirt sponsor
Al-Ahli	(Switzerland) Christian Gross	(Saudi Arabia) Taisir Al-Jassim	Puma	
Al-Batin	(Saudi Arabia) Khalid Al Koroni	(Saudi Arabia) Naif Eisa	skillano	
Al-Ettifaq	(Netherlands) Eelco Schattorie	(Saudi Arabia) Hassan Kadesh	Kappa	Al-Majdouie Hyundai
Al-Faisaly	(Italy) Giovanni Solinas	(Saudi Arabia) Omar Abdulaziz	Erreà	Aldrees
Al-Fateh	(Tunisia) Fathi Al-Jabal	(Saudi Arabia) Hamdan Al-Hamdan	Romai	Al-Majdouie Hyundai
Al-Hilal	(Argentina) Ramón Díaz	(Saudi Arabia) Salman Al-Faraj	Nike	Mobily
Al-Ittihad	(Chile) José Luis Sierra	(Saudi Arabia) Adnan Fallatah	Joma	
Al-Khaleej	(Tunisia) Jalel Kadri	(Saudi Arabia) Abdullah Al-Salem	Joma	Al-Majdouie Hyundai
Al-Nassr	(France) Patrice Carteron	(Saudi Arabia) Hussein Abdulghani	Saudi Sporta	Mobily
Al-Qadisiyah	(Saudi Arabia) Bandar Basreh (interim)	(Saudi Arabia) Naif Hazazi	Lotto	Hokail Dental Clinic
Al-Raed	(Tunisia) Nacif Beyaoui	(Saudi Arabia) Jufain Al-Bishi	Hattrick	
Al-Shabab	(Saudi Arabia) Sami Al-Jaber	(Saudi Arabia) Ahmed Otaif	Romai	
Al-Taawoun	(Portugal) José Manuel Gomes	(Syria) Jehad Al-Hussain	Joma	Herfy
Al-Wehda	(Egypt) Adel Abdel Rahman	(Saudi Arabia) Waleed Mahboob	Erreà	

=== Managerial changes ===
Team	Outgoing manager	Date of vacancy	Manner of departure	Pos.	Incoming manager	Date of appointment
Al-Faisaly	(Romania) Liviu Ciobotariu	17 May 2016	Sacked	Pre-season	(Brazil) Hélio dos Anjos	23 May 2016
Al-Hilal	(Greece) Georgios Donis	18 May 2016	Sacked	Pre-season	(Saudi Arabia) Abdullatif Al-Hussaini (interim)	18 May 2016
Al-Fateh	(Tunisia) Nacif Beyaoui	29 May 2016	End of contract	Pre-season	(Portugal) Ricardo Sá Pinto	29 May 2016
Al-Taawoun	(Portugal) José Manuel Gomes	29 May 2016	Signed by Al-Ahli	Pre-season	(Switzerland) Darije Kalezić	2 June 2016
Al-Ahli	(Switzerland) Christian Gross	30 May 2016	End of contract	Pre-season	(Portugal) José Manuel Gomes	31 May 2016
Al-Khaleej	(Tunisia) Jalel Kadri	30 May 2016	End of contract	Pre-season	(Belgium) Patrick De Wilde	9 June 2016
Al-Nassr	(Spain) Raúl Caneda	21 June 2016	Sacked	Pre-season	(Croatia) Zoran Mamić	21 June 2016
Al-Hilal	(Saudi Arabia) Abdullatif Al-Hussaini (interim)	12 June 2016	Interim period ended	Pre-season	(Uruguay) Gustavo Matosas	12 June 2016
Al-Raed	(Serbia) Aleksandar Ilić	16 June 2016	End of contract	Pre-season	(Tunisia) Nacif Beyaoui	12 June 2016
Al-Shabab	(Tunisia) Fathi Al-Jabal	22 June 2016	Resigned	Pre-season	(Saudi Arabia) Sami Al-Jaber	22 June 2016
Al-Ittihad	(Romania) Victor Pițurcă	28 July 2016	Resigned	Pre-season	(Chile) José Luis Sierra	28 July 2016
Al-Khaleej	(Belgium) Patrick De Wilde	30 August 2016	Mutual consent	12th	(Tunisia) Jalel Kadri	30 August 2016
Al-Hilal	(Uruguay) Gustavo Matosas	22 September 2016	Sacked	3rd	(Romania) Ciprian Panait (interim)	22 September 2016
Al-Fateh	(Portugal) Ricardo Sá Pinto	23 September 2016	Mutual consent	14th	(Tunisia) Fathi Al-Jabal	11 October 2016
Al-Ahli	(Portugal) José Manuel Gomes	30 September 2016	Sacked	5th	(Switzerland) Christian Gross	3 October 2016
Al-Hilal	(Romania) Ciprian Panait	15 October 2016	Interim period ended	2nd	(Argentina) Ramón Díaz	15 October 2016
Al-Taawoun	(Switzerland) Darije Kalezić	16 October 2016	Sacked	11th	(Romania) Constantin Gâlcă	18 October 2016
Al-Qadisiyah	(Saudi Arabia) Hamad Al-Dossari	29 October 2016	Resigned	13th	(Algeria) Riadh Belkhir (interim)	29 October 2016
Al-Ettifaq	(Tunisia) Djamel Belkacem	29 October 2016	Sacked	7th	(Netherlands) Eelco Schattorie (interim)	29 October 2016
Al-Batin	(Egypt) Adel Abdel Rahman	6 November 2016	Resigned	9th	(Saudi Arabia) Khalid Al Koroni	6 November 2016
Al-Qadisiyah	(Algeria) Riadh Belkhir (interim)	9 November 2016	Interim period ended	13th	(Brazil) Hélio dos Anjos	9 November 2016
Al-Faisaly	(Brazil) Hélio dos Anjos	9 November 2016	Signed by Al-Qadisiyah	10th	(Morocco) Fahd Elouarga (interim)	9 November 2016
Al-Ettifaq	(Netherlands) Eelco Schattorie (interim)	10 November 2016	Interim period ended	6th	(Spain) Juan Carlos Garrido	10 November 2016
Al-Faisaly	(Morocco) Fahd Elouarga (interim)	19 November 2016	Interim period ended	9th	(Croatia) Tomislav Ivković	19 November 2016
Al-Wehda	(Algeria) Kheïreddine Madoui	9 December 2016	Sacked	11th	(Egypt) Badreldin Hamed (interim)	9 December 2016
Al-Wehda	(Egypt) Badreldin Hamed (interim)	15 December 2016	Interim period ended	13th	(Egypt) Adel Abdel Rahman	15 December 2016
Al-Nassr	(Croatia) Zoran Mamić	28 January 2017	Resigned	4th	(France) Patrice Carteron	31 January 2017
Al-Ettifaq	(Spain) Juan Carlos Garrido	18 February 2017	Mutual consent	8th	(Netherlands) Eelco Schattorie	18 February 2017
Al-Faisaly	(Croatia) Tomislav Ivković	19 February 2017	Sacked	11th	(Italy) Giovanni Solinas	20 February 2017
Al-Taawoun	(Romania) Constantin Gâlcă	20 March 2017	Resigned	5th	(Portugal) José Manuel Gomes	21 March 2017
Al-Qadisiyah	(Brazil) Hélio dos Anjos	22 April 2017	Sacked	12th	(Saudi Arabia) Bandar Basreh (interim)	22 April 2017

=== Foreign players ===
The number of foreign players is limited to 4 per team, and should not be a goalkeeper.

Players name in bold indicates the player is registered during the mid-season transfer window.

Club	Player 1	Player 2	Player 3	Player 4	Former Players
Al-Ahli	(Egypt) Mohamed Abdel Shafy	(Greece) Giannis Fetfatzidis	(Iraq) **Saad Abdul-Amir**	(Ba'athist Syria) Omar Al Somah	(Brazil) Luíz Carlos
Al-Batin	(Brazil) **Jhonnattann**	(Brazil) Jou Silva	(Brazil) **Tarabai**	(Brazil) William Alves	(Egypt) Ahmed Hamoudi (Mali) Lassana Fané
Al-Ettifaq	(Burkina Faso) Mohamed Koffi	(Cameroon) Aminou Bouba	(Nigeria) **Michael Eneramo**	(Spain) **Juanmi Callejón**	(Brazil) Leo (Guinea) Boubacar Fofana
Al-Faisaly	(Brazil) **Igor Rossi**	(Brazil) Luisinho	(Croatia) **Martin Maloča**	(Romania) **Mircea Axente**	(Argentina) Gonzalo Cabrera (Brazil) Everaldo (Brazil) Rafael Alemão
Al-Fateh	(Brazil) **Sandro Manoel**	(Portugal) Ukra	(Tunisia) **Abdelkader Oueslati**	(Tunisia) **Lamjed Chehoudi**	(Brazil) João Guilherme (Brazil) Nathan Júnior (São Tomé and Príncipe) Luís Leal
Al-Hilal	(Brazil) Carlos Eduardo	(Brazil) Léo Bonatini	(Ba'athist Syria) **Omar Khribin**	(Uruguay) Nicolás Milesi	(Brazil) Tiago Alves
Al-Ittihad	(Chile) Carlos Villanueva	(Egypt) Mahmoud Kahraba	(Kuwait) Fahad Al Ansari	(Tunisia) Ahmed Akaïchi	
Al-Khaleej	(Brazil) Jandson	(Guinea) **Boubacar Fofana**	(Mauritania) **Ismail Diakhité**	(Senegal) Adama François	(Honduras) Alexander López (Togo) Sadat Ouro-Akoriko
Al-Nassr	(Brazil) Bruno Uvini	(Croatia) Ivan Tomečak	(Croatia) Marin Tomasov	(Paraguay) Víctor Ayala	
Al-Qadisiyah	(Brazil) Bismark	(Brazil) **Élton Arábia**	(Kuwait) Ahmed Al-Dhefiri	(Nigeria) Patrick Friday Eze	(Iraq) Saad Abdul-Amir
Al-Raed	(Brazil) Adriano	(Brazil) Daniel Amora	(Brazil) **Wander Luiz**	(Guinea) Ismaël Bangoura	(Brazil) Gilmar
Al-Shabab	(Algeria) Djamel Benlamri	(Algeria) Mohamed Benyettou	(Kuwait) Saif Al Hashan		(Brazil) Heberty
Al-Taawoun	(France) **Alassane N'Diaye**	(Portugal) Ricardo Machado	(Romania) **Lucian Sânmărtean**	(Ba'athist Syria) Jehad Al-Hussain	(Brazil) Sandro Manoel (Morocco) Mounir El Hamdaoui
Al-Wehda	(Egypt) **Ahmed Magdy**	(Egypt) **Sherif Hazem**	(Ghana) **Torric Jebrin**	(Uruguay) Adolfo Lima	(Brazil) Felipe Adão (Central African Republic) Eudes Dagoulou (Ba'athist Syria) Jehad Al Baour

== League table ==
Pos	Team	Pld	W	D	L	GF	GA	GD	Pts	Qualification or relegation
1	Al-Hilal (C)	26	21	3	2	63	16	+47	66	Qualification to AFC Champions League group stage
2	Al-Ahli	26	17	4	5	57	30	+27	55	Qualification to AFC Champions League group stage
3	Al-Nassr	26	16	4	6	44	25	+19	52 (Note: Al-Nassr finished ahead of Al-Ittihad on head-to-head points: Al-Ittihad 0–1 Al-Nassr, Al-Nassr 1–1 Al-Ittihad)	
4	Al-Ittihad (Note: Al-Ittihad were docked 3 points for failing to pay over debts.)	26	17	4	5	57	37	+20	52	
5	Al-Raed	26	11	2	13	37	47	−10	35	
6	Al-Shabab	26	8	9	9	28	32	−4	33	
7	Al-Taawoun	26	9	4	13	33	40	−7	31	
8	Al-Fateh	26	7	8	11	33	39	−6	29	
9	Al-Faisaly	26	6	10	10	30	41	−11	28 (Note: Al-Faisaly finished ahead of Al-Qadisiyah on head-to-head points: Al-Qadisiyah 1–1 Al-Faisaly, Al-Faisaly 3–2 Al-Qadisiyah)	
10	Al-Qadisiyah	26	6	10	10	38	38	0	28	
11	Al-Ettifaq	26	7	6	13	31	45	−14	27	
12	Al-Batin (O)	26	6	8	12	31	43	−12	26	Qualification to relegation play-off
13	Al-Khaleej (R)	26	5	8	13	32	51	−19	23	Relegation to First Division
14	Al-Wehda (R)	26	5	2	19	35	65	−30	17	Relegation to First Division

Updated to match(es) played on 4 May 2017. Source: slstat.com
Rules for classification: 1) Points; 2) Head-to-head points; 3) Head-to-head goal difference; 4) Total goal difference; 5) Total goals scored; 6) Play-off (only for deciding champion, relegation and AFC competitions participation).
(C) Champions; (O) Play-off winners; (R) Relegated

=== Positions by round ===
The following table lists the positions of teams after each week of matches. In order to preserve the chronological evolution, any postponed matches are not included to the round at which they were originally scheduled, but added to the full round they were played immediately afterwards. If a club from the Saudi Professional League wins the King Cup, they will qualify for the AFC Champions League, unless they have already qualified for it through their league position. In this case, an additional AFC Champions League group stage berth will be given to the 3rd placed team, and the AFC Champions League play-off round spot will be given to 4th.

Team ╲ Round	1	2	3	4	5	6	7	8	9	10	11	12	13	14	15	16	17	18	19	20	21	22	23	24	25	26
Al-Hilal	4	2	4	3	2	1	2	2	1	1	1	1	2	1	1	1	1	1	1	1	1	1	1	1	1	1
Al-Ahli	1	1	3	5	3	5	5	5	3	5	4	4	3	2	2	2	2	2	4	3	3	3	4	4	3	2
Al-Nassr	2	8	5	6	5	3	3	3	2	3	3	3	4	4	3	4	3	3	2	2	2	2	2	3	2	3
Al-Ittihad	5	3	1	1	1	2	1	1	4	2	2	2	1	3	4	3	4	4	3	4	4	4	3	2	4	4
Al-Raed	9	5	9	7	9	7	6	7	7	7	8	8	7	8	8	7	9	6	7	6	7	7	6	5	5	5
Al-Shabab	8	11	8	8	6	4	4	4	5	4	5	5	5	5	5	5	5	5	5	5	6	5	5	6	7	6
Al-Taawoun	10	13	10	11	11	11	10	11	10	8	7	7	8	7	7	8	7	8	6	8	5	6	7	7	6	7
Al-Fateh	14	14	14	14	14	14	14	14	14	14	13	14	14	14	14	14	12	12	13	13	14	12	11	10	10	8
Al-Faisaly	3	4	6	4	7	9	11	10	9	11	11	13	12	12	9	11	10	11	11	11	10	9	9	9	9	9
Al-Qadsiah	7	10	12	13	13	13	13	13	12	13	12	12	10	9	10	9	11	9	9	7	8	10	10	12	11	10
Al-Ettifaq	13	6	2	2	4	6	7	6	6	6	6	6	6	6	6	6	6	7	8	9	9	8	8	8	8	11
Al-Batin	12	7	7	10	8	8	9	9	11	10	10	9	9	10	13	10	8	10	10	10	11	11	12	11	12	12
Al-Khaleej	11	12	13	9	10	12	12	12	13	12	14	10	11	11	11	12	13	13	14	14	12	13	13	13	13	13
Al-Wehda	6	9	11	12	12	10	8	8	8	9	9	11	13	13	12	13	14	14	12	12	13	14	14	14	14	14

Leader
2018 AFC Champions League group stage
2018 AFC Champions League play-off round
Qualified for relegation play-off
Relegation to 2017–18 First Division

Source: slstat.com

== Results ==
Home \ Away	AHL	BAT	ETT	FSY	FAT	HIL	ITT	KHJ	NSR	QAD	RAE	SHB	TWN	WHD
Al-Ahli		1–1	4–1	2–1	2–0	1–2	1–1	4–1	0–2	2–0	1–0	3–1	2–1	4–0
Al-Batin	0–1		2–0	0–0	1–1	0–2	0–1	1–0	4–3	1–1	4–0	1–0	1–0	1–1
Al-Ettifaq	1–4	2–1		3–1	2–2	0–1	1–4	3–1	1–0	2–2	0–1	0–1	3–0	1–3
Al-Faisaly	3–6	2–2	3–3		0–0	0–2	2–4	3–1	1–2	3–2	1–1	0–1	1–0	2–1
Al-Fateh	0–1	3–2	0–0	1–0		0–1	4–1	2–4	1–2	1–1	3–1	1–1	0–2	4–2
Al-Hilal	0–0	2–0	1–2	4–0	1–0		0–2	4–0	5–1	1–1	2–1	3–0	4–2	6–0
Al-Ittihad	1–4	2–0	4–1	2–2	3–2	1–3		1–1	0–1	4–2	3–2	0–1	3–1	1–0
Al-Khaleej	2–2	2–2	1–2	1–1	1–1	1–6	2–3		0–3	2–1	1–2	1–2	0–1	4–2
Al-Nassr	1–0	4–0	2–0	0–0	4–1	1–1	1–1	0–1		1–0	3–1	1–0	2–1	2–1
Al-Qadsiah	4–1	1–1	1–1	1–1	1–2	1–2	0–3	0–0	3–2		3–0	1–1	0–1	3–1
Al-Raed	1–3	2–1	2–0	1–0	3–2	0–3	2–3	3–2	0–1	2–1		2–2	3–2	3–1
Al-Shabab	3–2	3–1	1–1	1–2	2–0	1–2	0–2	1–1	1–1	0–0	1–2		2–2	0–0
Al-Taawoun	2–3	4–3	1–0	0–0	0–0	0–2	1–2	0–0	2–1	1–3	2–1	2–0		3–1
Al-Wehda	1–3	5–1	2–1	0–1	1–2	1–3	3–5	1–2	0–3	2–5	2–1	1–2	3–2	

Updated to match(es) played on 4 May 2017. Source: slstat.com
Legend: Blue = home team win; Yellow = draw; Red = away team win.

=== Season progress ===
Team ╲ Round	1	2	3	4	5	6	7	8	9	10	11	12	13	14	15	16	17	18	19	20	21	22	23	24	25	26
Al-Ahli	W	W	L	D	W	L	W	W	W	L	W	W	W	W	W	W	W	L	L	D	W	D	D	W	W	W
Al-Batin	L	W	D	L	W	D	L	L	L	D	L	W	D	L	L	W	W	L	D	D	L	D	L	W	L	D
Al-Ettifaq	L	W	W	W	D	L	L	W	W	W	L	D	D	L	L	L	L	D	L	L	L	W	D	L	D	L
Al-Faisaly	W	D	D	W	L	L	L	L	D	L	L	L	D	D	W	L	W	L	D	D	W	W	D	L	D	D
Al-Fateh	L	L	D	L	D	D	L	L	D	D	W	L	L	L	L	W	W	D	L	D	L	W	W	W	D	W
Al-Hilal	W	W	L	W	W	W	L	W	W	W	W	W	D	W	W	W	D	W	W	W	W	W	D	W	W	W
Al-Ittihad	W	W	W	D	W	L	W	W	L	W	W	W	W	W	D	W	L	W	W	L	W	D	W	W	D	L
Al-Khaleej	L	L	D	W	L	L	L	D	L	W	L	W	L	D	D	L	L	D	L	D	W	L	W	D	D	L
Al-Nassr	W	L	W	L	W	W	W	W	W	L	W	D	D	W	W	L	W	W	W	D	W	D	W	L	W	L
Al-Qadisiyah	D	D	L	L	L	D	L	D	D	L	W	D	W	D	L	W	D	W	D	W	L	L	L	L	D	W
Al-Raed	L	W	L	W	L	W	W	L	L	D	L	L	W	L	L	W	L	W	D	W	L	L	W	W	L	W
Al-Shabab	D	L	W	D	W	W	W	W	D	D	L	D	D	D	W	L	L	D	L	D	L	W	L	L	L	W
Al-Taawoun	L	L	W	D	L	D	W	L	D	W	W	L	L	W	L	L	W	L	W	L	W	L	L	D	W	L
Al-Wehda	W	L	L	L	L	W	W	L	D	L	L	L	L	L	W	L	L	L	W	D	L	L	L	L	L	L

Source: slstat.com
W = Win; D = Draw; L = Lose

== Relegation play-offs ==
Al-Batin which finished 12th will face Najran, the 3rd-placed 2016–17 Saudi First Division side for a two-legged play-off. Al-Batin beat Najran 3–2 on aggregate.

Team 1	Agg.	Team 2	1st leg	2nd leg
Najran	2–3	Al-Batin	0–1	2–2

=== First leg ===
11 May 2017
19:15 AST
(UTC+3)

Najran	0–1	Al-Batin
	Report	Tarabai 16'

Prince Sultan bin Abdul Aziz Stadium, Abha
Referee: Khaled Al-Teris

=== Second leg ===
16 May 2017
19:20 AST
(UTC+3)

Al-Batin	2–2	Najran
Jorge Santos 39'; Dakheel 55'	Report	Al-Mansor 51'; Al-Robeai 52'

Al-Batin Club Stadium, Hafar al-Batin
Referee: Turki Al-Khudair

== Statistics ==
=== Top scorers ===
As of 4 May 2017

Rank	Player	Club	Goals
1	(Ba'athist Syria) Omar Al Somah	Al-Ahli	24
2	(Guinea) Ismaël Bangoura	Al-Raed	18
3	(Egypt) Mahmoud Kahraba	Al-Ittihad	16
3	(Saudi Arabia) Mukhtar Fallatah	Al-Wehda	16
5	(Brazil) Carlos Eduardo	Al-Hilal	12
5	(Brazil) Jandson	Al-Khaleej	12
5	(Brazil) Jou Silva	Al-Batin	12
5	(Brazil) Léo Bonatini	Al-Hilal	12
9	(Saudi Arabia) Fahad Al-Muwallad	Al-Ittihad	11
10	(Algeria) Mohamed Benyettou	Al-Shabab	10

=== Top assists ===
As of 4 May 2017

Rank	Player	Club	Assists
1	(Chile) Carlos Villanueva	Al-Ittihad	11
2	(Saudi Arabia) Sultan Al-Sawadi	Al-Raed	8
3	(Brazil) Luisinho	Al-Faisaly	6
3	(Greece) Giannis Fetfatzidis	Al-Ahli	6
3	(Saudi Arabia) Abdurahman Al-Obaid	Al-Qadsiah	6
3	(Saudi Arabia) Yahya Al-Shehri	Al-Nassr	6
3	(Tunisia) Ahmed Akaïchi	Al-Ittihad	6
8	(Brazil) Carlos Eduardo	Al-Hilal	5
8	(Croatia) Ivan Tomečak	Al-Nassr	5
8	(Nigeria) Patrick Friday Eze	Al-Qadsiah	5
8	(Saudi Arabia) Adnan Fallatah	Al-Ittihad	5
8	(Saudi Arabia) Fahad Al-Muwallad	Al-Ittihad	5
8	(Ba'athist Syria) Jehad Al-Hussain	Al-Taawoun	5

=== Hat-tricks ===
Player	For	Against	Result	Date	Ref.
(Saudi Arabia) Mansor Hamzi	Al-Faisaly	Al-Khaleej	3–1	12 August 2016	
(Egypt) Mahmoud Kahraba^{4}	Al-Ittihad	Al-Wehda	5–3	18 September 2016	
(Algeria) Mohamed Benyettou	Al-Shabab	Al-Ahli	3–2	18 September 2016	
(Saudi Arabia) Mukhtar Fallatah	Al-Wehda	Al-Batin	5–1	29 October 2016	
(Ba'athist Syria) Omar Al Somah^{4}	Al-Ahli	Al-Khaleej	4–1	29 October 2016	
(Brazil) Jandson	Al-Khaleej	Al-Wehda	4–2	14 April 2017	
(Ba'athist Syria) Omar Khribin	Al-Hilal	Al-Nassr	5–1	4 May 2017	

^{4} Player scored four goals

=== Clean sheets ===
As of 4 May 2017

Rank	Player	Club	Clean sheets
1	(Saudi Arabia) Abdullah Al-Mayouf	Al-Hilal	13
2	(Saudi Arabia) Fahad Al-Shammari	Al-Taawoun	7
2	(Saudi Arabia) Waleed Abdullah	Al-Nassr	7
4	(Saudi Arabia) Mazyad Freeh	Al-Batin	6
5	(Saudi Arabia) Hussain Shae'an	Al-Nassr	5
6	(Saudi Arabia) Ahmed Al-Rehaili	Al-Ahli	4
6	(Saudi Arabia) Mustafa Malayekah	Al-Faisaly	4

=== Discipline ===
==== Player ====
- Most yellow cards: 11
  - (Saudi Arabia) Yassin Barnawi (Al-Qadsiah)
- Most red cards: 2
  - (Saudi Arabia) Hatim Belal (Al-Wehda)
  - (Senegal) Adama François Sene (Al-Khaleej)

==== Club ====
- Most yellow cards: 59
  - Al-Raed
- Most red cards: 5
  - Al-Khaleej
  - Al-Wehda

== Awards ==
=== Annual awards ===
Award	Winner	Club
Best Player (CNN poll)	(Saudi Arabia) Nawaf Al-Abed	Al-Hilal
Saudi Pro League top scorer	(Syria) Omar Al-Somah (24 goals)	Al-Ahli

=== Team of the Season ===
Team of the Season
Goalkeeper	(Saudi Arabia) Abdullah Al-Mayouf (Al-Hilal)			
Defenders	(Saudi Arabia) Mohammed Al-Breik (Al-Hilal)	(Saudi Arabia) Osama Hawsawi (Al-Hilal)	(Algeria) Djamel Benlamri (Al-Shabab)	(Saudi Arabia) Yasser Al-Shahrani (Al-Hilal)
Midfielders	(Saudi Arabia) Nawaf Al-Abed (Al-Hilal)	(Brazil) Carlos Eduardo (Al-Hilal)	(Kuwait) Fahad Al Ansari (Al-Ittihad)	(Saudi Arabia) Salman Al-Faraj (Al-Hilal)
Forwards	(Syria) Omar Al-Somah (Al-Ahli)	(Saudi Arabia) Fahad Al-Muwallad (Al-Ittihad)		

== Attendances ==
=== By round ===
2016–17 Professional League Attendance
Round	Total	GP.	Avg. Per Game
Round 1	42,303	7	6,043
Round 2	33,135	7	4,734
Round 3	20,361	7	2,909
Round 4	66,445	7	9,492
Round 5	45,460	7	6,494
Round 6	61,352	7	8,765
Round 7	48,886	7	6,984
Round 8	50,102	7	7,157
Round 9	36,805	7	5,258
Round 10	67,399	7	9,628
Round 11	51,322	7	7,332
Round 12	37,001	7	5,286
Round 13	59,460	7	8,494
Round 14	59,107	7	8,444
Round 15	37,047	7	5,292
Round 16	88,613	7	12,659
Round 17	75,441	7	10,777
Round 18	25,890	7	3,699
Round 19	51,509	7	7,358
Round 20	82,696	7	11,814
Round 21	32,435	7	4,634
Round 22	28,931	7	4,133
Round 23	27,060	7	3,866
Round 24	38,754	7	5,536
Round 25	30,719	7	4,388
Round 26	72,199	7	10,314
Total	1,270,432	182	6,949

=== By team ===
Pos	Team	Total	High	Low	Average	Change
1	Al-Ittihad	330,291	53,661	6,686	25,407	+11.8%
2	Al-Ahli	268,951	51,659	2,241	20,689	−25.4%
3	Al-Hilal	200,037	59,174	3,921	15,387	+29.6%
4	Al-Nassr	99,258	27,181	1,422	7,635	+20.7%
5	Al-Raed	75,953	15,192	1,723	5,843	+23.5%
6	Al-Taawoun	65,329	11,966	2,404	5,025	−10.4%
7	Al-Ettifaq	48,976	14,640	506	3,767	n/a^{†}
8	Al-Fateh	43,989	8,071	1,097	3,384	+18.3%
9	Al-Shabab	36,407	12,815	525	2,801	−4.7%
10	Al-Batin	33,921	5,222	473	2,609	n/a^{†}
11	Al-Qadsiah	22,341	5,820	63	1,719	−36.2%
12	Al-Wehda	20,284	5,006	276	1,560	−46.6%
13	Al-Khaleej	14,813	5,242	103	1,139	−19.7%
14	Al-Faisaly	9,882	2,506	204	760	+58.0%
	League total	1,270,432	59,174	63	6,980	+1.1%

Updated to games played on 4 May 2017
Notes:
^{†} Teams played previous season in First Division.

== See also ==
- 2016–17 Saudi First Division
- 2017 King Cup
- 2016–17 Crown Prince Cup
- 2016 Super Cup
