= Talal Al-Absi =

Saudi Arabian footballer (born 1993)

Talal al-Absi
Personal information
- Full name: Talal Ali Al-Absi
- Date of birth: 22 February 1993 (age 33)
- Place of birth: Jeddah, Saudi Arabia
- Height: 1.75 m (5 ft 9 in)
- Position: Defender

Youth career
- Al-Ittihad

Senior career*
Years	Team	Apps	(Gls)
2012–2015	Al-Ittihad	31	(0)
2015–2020	Al-Taawoun	91	(3)
2020–2023	Al-Ahli	22	(1)
2023–2024	Al-Hazem	14	(0)

International career^{‡}
2014–2016	Saudi Arabia U23	3	(0)
2019–	Saudi Arabia	1	(0)
- * Club domestic league appearances and goals as of 21:01, 28 May 2022 (UTC) ‡ National team caps and goals as of 20:01, 8 December 2019 (UTC)

Talal Al-Absi (Arabic: طلال العبسي, born 22 February 1993) is a Saudi Arabian footballer who currently plays as a defender for the Saudi national team.

== Career ==
Talal Al-Absi started his career at Al-Ittihad and made his debut on 14 April 2013 in the league match against Najran. He made his continental debut for Al-Ittihad in the Champions League group stage match against Iranian side Tractor which ended in a 1–0 loss.

On 17 July 2015, Al-Absi signed a two-year contract with Al-Taawoun. He made his debut for the club on 21 August 2015 against Al-Ahli. On 28 January 2016, he scored his first goal for the club in a 2–2 draw with Al-Ahli. He made 24 league appearances as he helped the club finish fourth and qualify for the Champions League for the first time in history. On 11 May 2017, Al-Absi extended his contract with the club, keeping him at the club until 2020. On 2 May 2019, Al-Absi captained Al-Taawoun in their first King Cup final against former club Al-Ittihad. He scored the equalizer in the 55th minute as Al-Taawoun won their first King Cup title. On 4 January 2020, Al-Absi missed a penalty in the penalty shoot-outs in the eventual loss against Al-Nassr in the 2019 Saudi Super Cup.

On 26 January 2020, Al-Absi signed a three-year contract with Al-Ahli. He joined the club following the conclusion of the 2019–20 season.

On 9 June 2023, Al-Absi joined Al-Hazem on a free transfer.

== Career statistics ==
=== Club ===
As of match played 9 September 2020

Club	Season	League		King Cup		Crown Prince Cup		Asia		Other		Total	
Club	Season	Apps	Goals	Apps	Goals	Apps	Goals	Apps	Goals	Apps	Goals	Apps	Goals
Al-Ittihad	2012–13	3	0	1	0	0	0	—		—		4	0
Al-Ittihad	2013–14	15	0	4	0	2	0	7	0	—		28	0
Al-Ittihad	2014–15	13	0	0	0	2	0	—		—		15	0
Al-Ittihad	Total	31	0	5	0	4	0	7	0	0	0	47	0
Al-Taawoun	2015–16	24	1	0	0	2	0	—		—		26	1
Al-Taawoun	2016–17	18	0	1	0	1	0	2	1	—		22	1
Al-Taawoun	2017–18	1	0	0	0	0	0	—		—		1	0
Al-Taawoun	2018–19	26	0	5	0	—		—		—		31	0
Al-Taawoun	2019–20	22	2	1	0	—		2	0	1 (Note: Appearances in Saudi Super Cup)	0	26	2
Al-Taawoun	Total	91	3	7	0	3	0	4	1	1	0	106	4
Al-Ahli	2020–21	3	1	0	0	2	0	—		—		5	1
Career totals		125	4	12	0	7	0	13	1	1	0	158	5

== Honours ==
=== Club ===
Al-Ittihad

- King Cup: 2013

Al-Taawoun

- King Cup: 2019

=== International ===
Saudi Arabia

- Arabian Gulf Cup:
  - Runner-up: 2019
