= Abdullah Al-Salman =

Saudi Arabian footballer

Personal information
- Full name: Abdullah Ibrahim Al-Salman
- Date of birth: 5 May 1994 (age 32)
- Place of birth: Saudi Arabia
- Height: 1.75 m (5 ft 9 in)
- Position: Winger

Team information
- Current team: Al-Hilaliyah
- Number: 12

Youth career
- –2015: Al-Taawoun

Senior career*
Years	Team	Apps	(Gls)
2015–2018	Al-Taawoun	1	(0)
2017	→ Al-Nahda (loan)		
2020–2021	Al-Najma		
2021–2023	Al-Rayyan		
2023–2024	Al-Qala		
2024–	Al-Hilaliyah		
- * Club domestic league appearances and goals

Abdullah Al-Salman (Arabic: عبد الله السلمان; born 5 May 1994) is a Saudi footballer who plays for Al-Hilaliyah as a winger.
