= Mohammed Rabee =

Saudi Arabian footballer

Personal information
- Full name: Mohammed Rabee
- Date of birth: May 10, 1982 (age 44)
- Place of birth: Saudi Arabia
- Height: 1.83 m (6 ft 0 in)
- Position: Goalkeeper

Youth career
- Al-Hazm

Senior career*
Years	Team	Apps	(Gls)
2004–2009	Al-Hazm		
2009	→ Al-Orobah (loan)		
2009–2011	Abha		
2011–2012	Al-Orobah		
2012–2014	Abha		
2014–2019	Al-Orobah		
2019–2021	Al-Shoulla		
- * Club domestic league appearances and goals

Mohammed Rabee (Arabic: محمد ربيع; born May 10, 1982) is a Saudi football player who plays as a goalkeeper.
