= Abdullah Bo Homail =

Saudi football player

Personal information
- Full name: Abdullah Khaled Bo Homail
- Date of birth: July 10, 1986 (age 40)
- Place of birth: Saudi Arabia
- Height: 1.76 m (5 ft 9 1/2 in)
- Positions: Winger; right-back

Youth career
- Hajer

Senior career*
Years	Team	Apps	(Gls)
2005–2008	Hajer		
2008–2011	Al-Fateh		
2011–2015	Hajer		
2015–2018	Al-Adalah		
2018–2019	Al-Omran		
2019	Al-Adalah	6	(0)
2019–2020	Hajer		
2021–2022	Al-Nojoom		
- * Club domestic league appearances and goals

Abdullah Bo Homail (Arabic: عبد الله بو هميل; born July 10, 1986) is a Saudi football player who plays as a winger.
