= Madallah Al-Olayan =

Saudi professional footballer (born 1994)

Personal information
- Full name: Madallah Ali Al-Olayan
- Date of birth: 25 August 1994 (age 32)
- Place of birth: Buraidah, Saudi Arabia
- Height: 1.70 m (5 ft 7 in)
- Position: Full back

Team information
- Current team: Al-Ettifaq
- Number: 33

Youth career
- 2007-2012: Al-Taawoun

Senior career*
Years	Team	Apps	(Gls)
2012–2020	Al-Taawoun	98	(2)
2020–2022	Al-Hilal	27	(1)
2022–2024	Al-Ittihad	51	(0)
2024–	Al-Ettifaq	58	(2)

International career^{‡}
2019–	Saudi Arabia	4	(0)
- * Club domestic league appearances and goals as of 5 November 2026 ‡ National team caps and goals as of 9 January 2023

Madallah Ali Al-Olayan (Arabic: مد الله علي العليان, born 25 August 1994) is a Saudi Arabian professional footballer who currently plays as a full back for Saudi club Al-Ettifaq.

== Playing career ==
Madallah Alolayan started the youth ranks of Al-Al-Taawoun At the age of 13 years old. and made his professional debut during a 2-1 loss against Al-Faisaly on 6 December 2012, replacing Basem Al-Sharif after 78 minutes. His first experience as a part of the starting XI came three months later, when he played 90 minutes against Al-Ittihad FC in March. His playing time increased during the 2013–14 season, where he made 23 combined league and cup appearances. Al-Taawoun finished 5th.

His role decreased again the following season, where he made only seven appearances, and Al-Taawoun finished 9th.

On 24 January 2020 he joined Al-Hilal on a 3-year contract. He made his debut match against Abha and won 2-1. He played 29 games and scored 3 goals.

On 22 January 2022, Al-Olayan joined Al-Ittihad in a swap deal that saw Saud Abdulhamid join Al-Hilal.

On 7 July 2024, Al-Olayan joined Al-Ettifaq on a four-year deal.

== Career statistics ==
=== Club ===
As of 27 May 2024

Appearances and goals by club, season and competition
Club	Season	League			King Cup		Crown Prince Cup (Note: Discontinued on September 19, 2017)		Asia		Other		Total	
Club	Season	Division	Apps	Goals	Apps	Goals	Apps	Goals	Apps	Goals	Apps	Goals	Apps	Goals
Al-Taawoun	2012–13	Pro League	6	0	—		1	0	—		—		7	0
Al-Taawoun	2013–14	Pro League	22	0	1	0	2	0	—		—		25	0
Al-Taawoun	2014–15	Pro League	7	0	1	0	0	0	—		1 (Note: Appearances in GCC Champions League)	0	9	0
Al-Taawoun	2015–16	Pro League	0	0	0	0	0	0	—		—		0	0
Al-Taawoun	2016–17	Pro League	6	1	2	1	0	0	2	0	—		10	2
Al-Taawoun	2017–18	Pro League	20	0	0	0	0	0	—		—		20	0
Al-Taawoun	2018–19	Pro League	26	0	4	0	—		—		—		30	0
Al-Taawoun	2019–20	Pro League	11	1	2	0	—		—		1 (Note: Appearance(s) in Super Cup)	0	14	1
Al-Taawoun	Total		98	2	10	1	3	0	2	0	2	0	115	3
Al-Hilal	2019–20	Pro League	12	0	1	0	—		3	0	—		16	0
Al-Hilal	2020–21	Pro League	8	0	1	0	—		2	0	—		11	0
Al-Hilal	2021–22	Pro League	7	1	1	0	—		0	0	—		8	1
Al-Hilal	Total		27	1	3	0	0	0	5	0	0	0	35	1
Al-Ittihad	2021–22	Pro League	7	0	2	0	—		—		—		9	0
Al-Ittihad	2022–23	Pro League	24	0	2	0	—		—		1	0	27	0
Al-Ittihad	2023–24	Pro League	20	0	3	0	—		5	0	6 (Note: Three appearances in Arab Club Champions Cup, two appearances in Saudi Super Cup, and one appearance in FIFA Club World Cup)	0	34	0
Al-Ittihad	Total		51	0	7	0	0	0	5	0	7	0	70	0
Career total			176	3	20	1	3	0	12	0	9	0	220	4

== Honours ==
Al-Taawoun

- Kings Cup: 2019

Al-Hilal

- Saudi Pro League: 2019–20, 2020–21
- Kings Cup: 2019–20
- AFC Champions League: 2021
- Saudi Super Cup: 2021

Al-Ittihad

- Saudi Pro League: 2022–23
- Saudi Super Cup: 2022
