= Abdulmajeed Al-Swat =

Saudi Arabian footballer

Personal information
- Full name: Abdulmajeed Abdullah Al-Swat
- Date of birth: 21 April 1995 (age 31)
- Place of birth: Ta'if, Saudi Arabia
- Height: 1.68 m (5 ft 6 in)
- Position: Midfielder

Youth career
- –2015: Al-Hilal

Senior career*
Years	Team	Apps	(Gls)
2015–2017	Al-Hilal	3	(0)
2017	→ Al-Taawoun (loan)	5	(0)
2017–2020	Al-Taawoun	50	(8)
2020–2021	Al-Ittihad	11	(0)
2021–2023	Al-Faisaly	9	(0)
2023–2024	Al-Kawkab		

International career^{‡}
2019	Saudi Arabia	1	(0)
- * Club domestic league appearances and goals as of 11 March 2020 ‡ National team caps and goals as of 19 November 2019

Abdulmajeed Abdullah Al-Swat (Arabic: عبد المجيد عبد الله السواط; born 21 April 1995) is a Saudi international footballer who plays as a midfielder.

On 20 September 2023, Al-Swat joined Second Division side Al-Kawkab.
