= Fayz Al-Sabiay =

Saudi Arabian footballer

Personal information
- Full name: Fayz Al-Sabiay
- Date of birth: October 9, 1982 (age 44)
- Place of birth: Dammam, Saudi Arabia
- Height: 1.86 m (6 ft 1 in)
- Position: Goalkeeper

Senior career*
Years	Team	Apps	(Gls)
2002–2007	Al-Khaleej	126	(5)
2005	→ Al-Ittihad(loan)	4	(0)
2007	→ Al-Raed(loan)	24	(0)
2007–2013	Ettifaq	85	(0)
2013–2015	Al-Hilal	12	(0)
2015–2017	Al-Taawoun	22	(0)
- * Club domestic league appearances and goals

Fayz Al-Sabiay (Arabic: فايز السبيعي; born 9 October 1982) is a Saudi football player. He is ex football player as a goalkeeper for Al-Taawoun. Ettifaq fc . Ex football director in Ettifaq fc 2020_2022

== Club career statistics ==
Club	Season	League		Crown Prince Cup		King Cup		ACL		AFC Cup		Total	
Club	Season	Apps	Goals	Apps	Goals	Apps	Goals	Apps	Goals	Apps	Goals	Apps	Goals
Al-Ettifaq	2008–09	6	0	2	0	2	0	0	0	0	0	10	0
Al-Ettifaq	2009–10	24	0	1	0	0	0	0	0	0	0	25	0
Al-Ettifaq	2010–11	18	0	3	0	2	0	0	0	0	0	23	0
Al-Ettifaq	2011–12	22	0	3	0	1	0	1	0	7	0	34	0
Al-Ettifaq	2012–13	15	0	1	0	2	0	6	0	0	0	24	0
Al-Ettifaq	Total	85	0	10	0	7	0	7	0	7	0	116	0
Al-Hilal	2013–14	12	0	2	0	1	0	3	0	0	0	18	0
Al-Hilal	2014–15	0	0	0	0	0	0	0	0	0	0	0	0
Al-Hilal	Total	12	0	2	0	1	0	3	0	0	0	18	0
Al-Taawoun	2015–16	22	0	1	0	0	0	0	0	0	0	23	0
Al-Taawoun	Total	22	0	1	0	0	0	0	0	0	0	23	0
Career Total		119	0	13	0	8	0	10	0	7	0	157	0

== Honours ==
=== Al-Khaleej ===
- Saudi First Division: 2005–06

=== Al-Hilal ===
- King Cup: 2015
