= Beckum, Overijssel =

Beckum
- Village
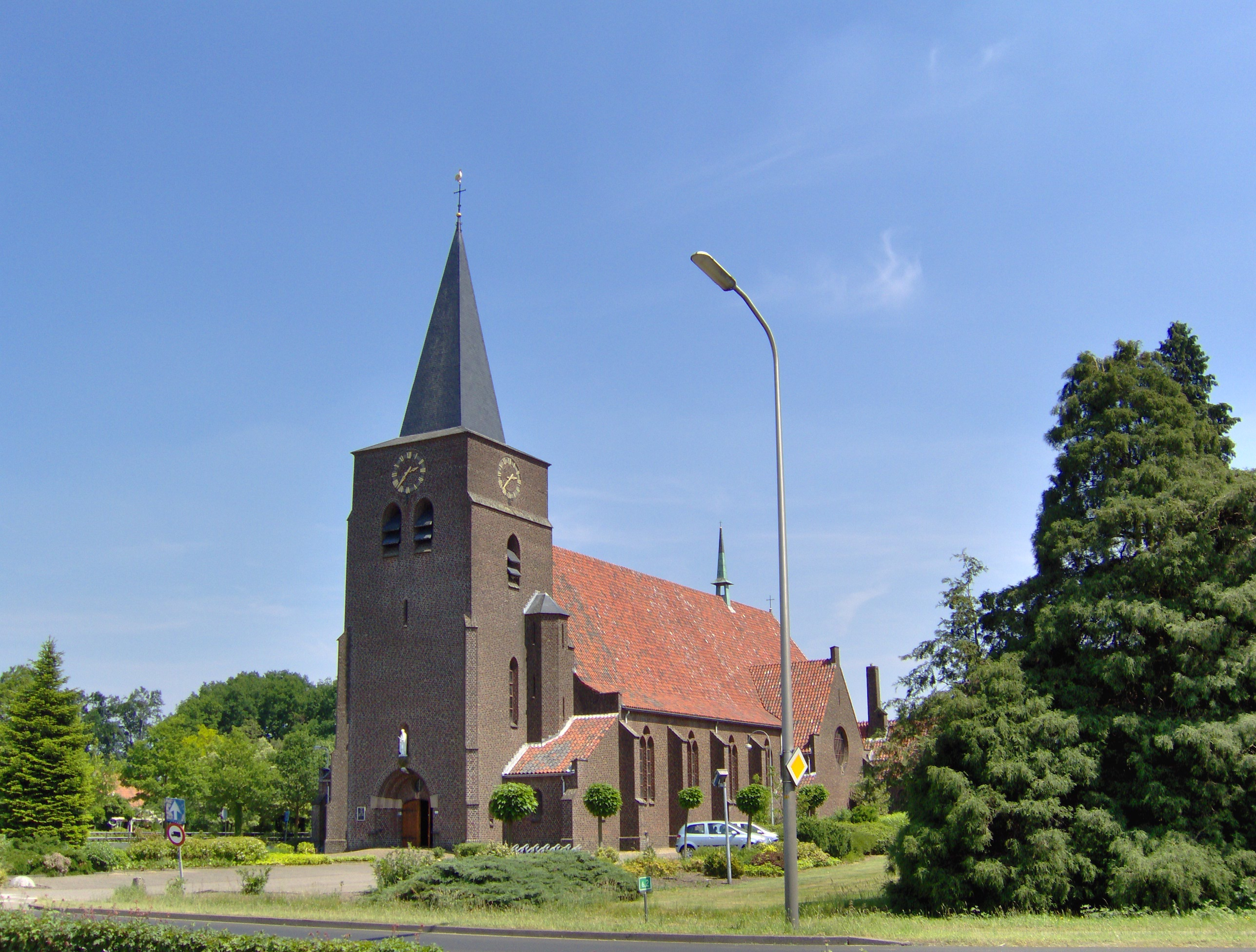
- The Roman Catholic St. Blasius Church

- Location in the Netherlands Beckum (Netherlands)
- Coordinates: 52°12′38″N 6°44′29″E
- Country: Netherlands
- Province: Overijssel
- Municipality: Hengelo

Area
  - Total: 3.93 km^{2} (1.52 sq mi)
- Elevation: 24 m (79 ft)

Population (2021)
  - Total: 175
  - Density: 44.5/km^{2} (115/sq mi)
- Time zone: UTC+1 (CET)
  - Summer (DST): UTC+2 (CEST)
- Postal code: 7482
- Dialing code: 053
- Website: www.beckum.nl

Beckum (Dutch pronunciation: [ˈbɛkʏm]) is a small village 3 km (2 mi) south of Hengelo, Netherlands. The village lies in the municipality of Hengelo, between Hengelo and Haaksbergen.

It was first mentioned in 1268 as Beckem, and might mean "settlement along a brook". In 1840, it was home to 304 people. At the centre of the village is the Roman Catholic Church of St. Blasius, built in 1938. The postal authorities have placed it under Haaksbergen.
