= Sultan Al-Ghamdi =

Saudi Arabian footballer

Personal information
- Full name: Sultan Mohammed Al-Ghamdi
- Date of birth: March 20, 1992 (age 34)
- Place of birth: Saudi Arabia
- Height: 1.85 m (6 ft 1 in)
- Position: Goalkeeper

Youth career
- Al-Ahli

Senior career*
Years	Team	Apps	(Gls)
2014–2018	Al-Taawoun	9	(0)
2018–2019	Al-Ain	9	(0)
2019–2020	Al-Jabalain	5	(0)
2020	Al-Ansar	11	(0)
2020–2021	Arar	34	(0)
2021–2022	Al-Orobah	28	(0)
2022–2023	Arar		
- * Club domestic league appearances and goals

Sultan Al-Ghamdi (Arabic: سلطان الغامدي; born 20 March 1992) is a Saudi football player who plays as a goalkeeper.

== Club career ==
On 6 August 2014, Al-Taawoun signed a one-year professional contract with Sultan Al-Ghamdi. In 14 April, Sultan played his professional debut against Al-Ettifaq in the Kings Cup where they won 2–0. On 17 April 2015, Sultan played his league debut against Al-Shabab where they drew 1-1. On 27 August 2014, he and his team were lost 4-3 when they played against Al-Ittihad.On 23 May 2015, Al-Taawoun renewed Sultan Al-Ghamdi's contract for three more years. On 11 February 2016, Sultan came as a substitute against Al-Qadisah after his teammate goalkeeper Faisal Al-Merqeb was injured in the 38th minute, but they won 2–1. On 20 February 2017, Sultan played his first AFC Champions League match against Lokomotiv where they won 1–0.

== Statistics ==
As of 20 September 2017

Club	Season	Saudi Premier League		Crown Prince Cup		Saudi Champions Cup		Saudi Super Cup		AFC Champions League		Total	
Club	Season	Apps	Goals	Apps	Goals	Apps	Goals	Apps	Goals	Apps	Goals	Apps	Goals
Al-Taawoun
Al-Taawoun	2016–17	5	0	0	0	2	0	0	0	3	0	10	0
Al-Taawoun	2017-18	0	0	0	0	0	0	0	0	0	0	0	0
Career total		5	0	0	0	2	0	0	0	3	0	10	0
