= Mousa Al-Shammeri =

Saudi Arabian footballer

Personal information
- Full name: Mousa Salman Al-Shammeri
- Date of birth: May 15, 1986 (age 40)
- Place of birth: Sakakah, Saudi Arabia
- Height: 1.75 m (5 ft 9 in)
- Position: Striker

Youth career
- Al-Orobah

Senior career*
Years	Team	Apps	(Gls)
2004–2009	Al-Orobah		
2009–2012	Al-Raed	44	(13)
2012–2013	Al-Faisaly	14	(1)
2013	Najran	5	(0)
2013–2015	Al-Orobah	24	(6)
2015–2016	Al-Shabab	20	(1)
2016–2017	Al-Taawon	10	(1)
2017–2022	Al-Orobah	97	(18)
- * Club domestic league appearances and goals as of 3 January 2022

Mousa Al-Shammeri (Arabic: موسى الشمري, born 15 May 1986) is a retired Saudi Arabian football player who played as a striker.

== Honours ==
Al-Orobah

- Saudi Second Division: 2007–08
