= Alassane N'Diaye (footballer, born 1991) =

French footballer

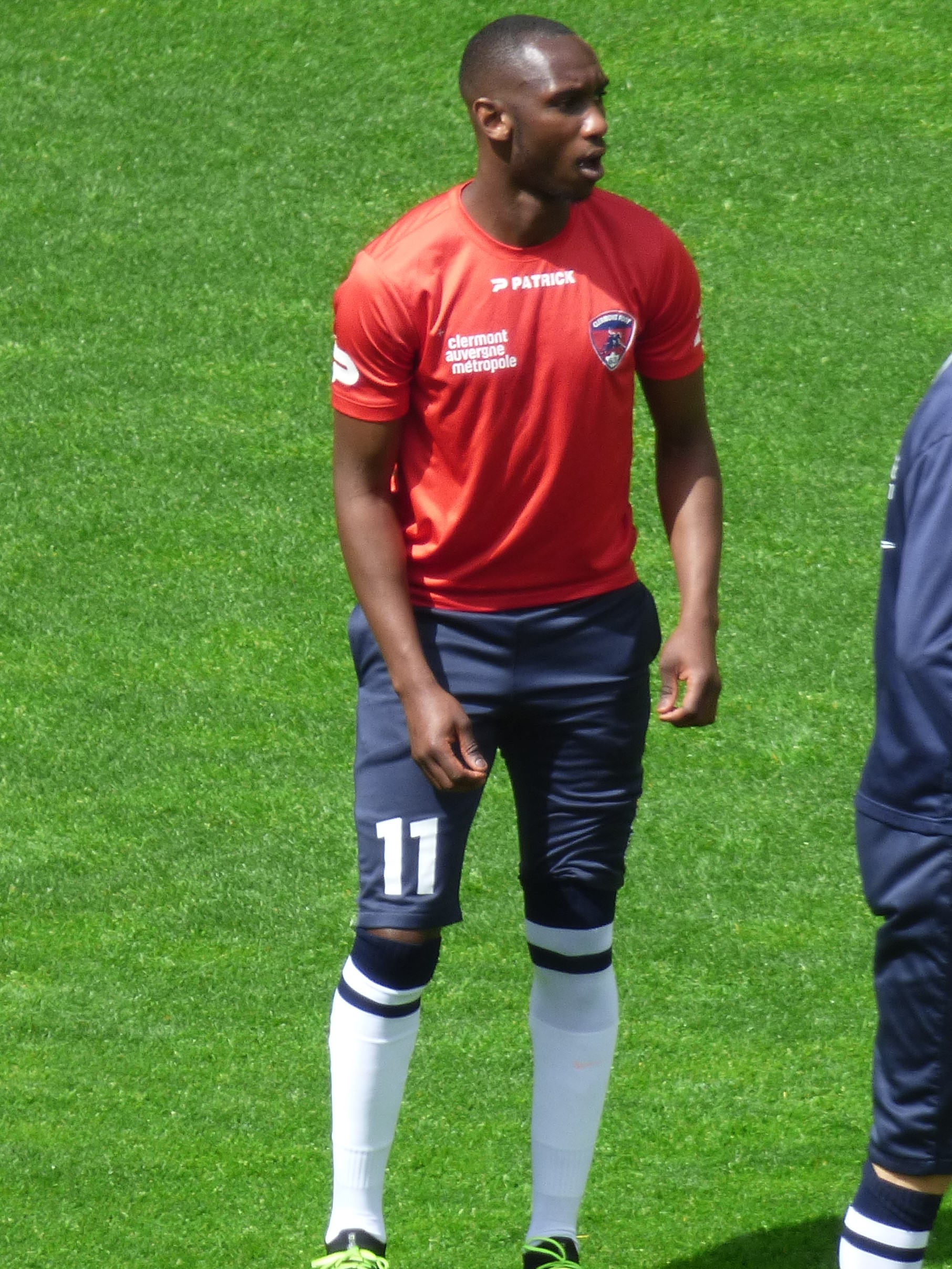
- N'Diaye with Clermont in 2019

Personal information
- Date of birth: 14 June 1991 (age 35)
- Place of birth: Limoges, France
- Height: 1.80 m (5 ft 11 in)
- Position: Forward

Team information
- Current team: Épinal

Senior career*
Years	Team	Apps	(Gls)
2009–2012	Niort	20	(2)
2012–2014	CA Bastia	66	(12)
2014–2015	Arles-Avignon	1	(0)
2014–2015	→ Strasbourg (loan)	33	(7)
2015–2017	Laval	38	(6)
2015–2017	Laval B	12	(6)
2017	Al-Taawoun	8	(3)
2017–2020	Clermont	93	(6)
2020–2023	Ajaccio	19	(0)
2021–2023	Ajaccio B	32	(8)
2024	Les Sables	9	(2)
2024–	Épinal	4	(0)
- * Club domestic league appearances and goals as of 7 December 2024

Alassane N'Diaye (born 14 June 1991) is a French professional footballer who plays as a forward for Championnat National 1 club Épinal.

== Career ==
Born in Limoges, N'Diaye began playing football in the Creuse department. He went to the Chamois Niortais's academy at age 15. He made his senior debut for the club in the 0–1 defeat at Montluçon on 6 February 2010, coming on as an 85th-minute substitute for Pierre Jamin. N'Diaye was handed his first start by Niort manager Pascal Gastien in the Championnat National match against Cherbourg on 12 October 2011, and he scored the opening goal in a 2–1 victory. He went on to make 18 appearances in total during the 2011–12 season, scoring twice, as Niort went on to finish as runners-up in the Championnat National.

N'Diaye was not offered a new contract by Niort in the summer of 2012 and subsequently signed for CA Bastia ahead of the 2012–13 campaign. In his first season with the Corsican outfit, he scored 10 goals in 37 league appearances as the team won promotion to Ligue 2 with a third-placed finish in the Championnat National. N'Diaye was again a regular starter for CA Bastia during the 2013–14 season, playing 34 games in all competitions as the side finished bottom of Ligue 2 and were relegated back to the third tier after only one year. In the penultimate game of the campaign on 9 May 2014, he scored against his former club Niort in a 1–1 draw at the Stade René Gaillard.

In June 2014, N'Diaye moved to Arles-Avignon for the 2014–15 season. He made his debut for Arles as an injury-time substitute for Ziri Hammar in the 0–0 draw with Ajaccio on 1 August. Three days later he joined Championnat National side Strasbourg on loan until the end of the season.

On 31 January 2017, N'Diaye joined Al-Taawoun

== Career statistics ==
As of match played 21 May 2022

Appearances and goals by club, season and competition
Club	Season	League			Cup (Note: Includes Coupe de France, Coupe de la Ligue, Kings Cup)		Continental (Note: Includes Asian Champions League)		Total	
Club	Season	Division	Apps	Goals	Apps	Goals	Apps	Goals	Apps	Goals
Chamois Niortais	2010–11	Championnat National	1	0	0	0	—		1	0
Chamois Niortais	2011–12	Championnat National	19	2	4	0	—		23	2
Chamois Niortais	Total		20	2	4	0	—		24	2
CA Bastia	2012–13	Championnat National	37	10	6	4	—		43	14
CA Bastia	2013–14	Ligue 2	29	2	5	0	—		34	2
CA Bastia	Total		66	12	11	4	—		77	16
Arles-Avignon	2014–15	Ligue 2	1	0	0	0	—		1	0
Strasbourg (loan)	2014–15	Championnat National	33	7	5	2	—		38	9
Laval	2015–16	Ligue 2	21	2	5	0	—		26	2
Laval	2016–17	Ligue 2	17	4	4	0	—		31	4
Laval	Total		38	6	9	0	—		47	6
Laval B	2015–16	Championnat de France Amateur 2	9	6	—		—		9	6
Laval B	2016–17	Championnat de France Amateur 2	3	0	—		—		3	0
Laval B	Total		12	6	—		—		12	6
Al-Taawoun	2016–17	Saudi Professional League	8	3	3	2	6	2	17	7
Clermont	2017–18	Ligue 2	38	2	4	1	—		42	3
Clermont	2018–19	Ligue 2	36	3	5	0	—		41	3
Clermont	2019–20	Ligue 2	19	1	3	1	—		22	2
Clermont	Total		93	6	12	2	—		102	8
Ajaccio	2020–21	Ligue 2	7	0	2	0	—		9	0
Ajaccio	2021–22	Ligue 2	12	0	1	0	—		13	0
Ajaccio	Total		19	0	3	0	—		22	0
Ajaccio B	2021–22	Championnat National 3	12	4	—		—		12	4
Career total			302	46	47	10	6	2	355	58
