= Ricardo Machado =

Portuguese footballer

Personal information
- Full name: Ricardo Jorge Tavares Machado
- Date of birth: 13 September 1988 (age 38)
- Place of birth: Vila Nova de Gaia, Portugal
- Height: 1.90 m (6 ft 3 in)
- Position: Centre-back

Team information
- Current team: Florgrade
- Number: 44

Youth career
- 1999–2006: Dragões Sandinenses
- 2006–2007: Nacional

Senior career*
Years	Team	Apps	(Gls)
2007–2008	Machico	11	(0)
2008–2011	Marítimo B	51	(3)
2010–2011	→ Feirense (loan)	13	(1)
2011–2014	Braşov	90	(8)
2015	Dinamo București	6	(0)
2015–2020	Al Taawoun	118	(8)
2021	Penafiel	5	(0)
2022	Académico Viseu	15	(1)
2022–2023	Al-Sahel	25	(1)
2023–	Florgrade	69	(5)
- * Club domestic league appearances and goals as of 00:15, 17 July 2026 (UTC)

Ricardo Jorge Tavares Machado (born 13 September 1988) is a Portuguese professional footballer who plays for Florgrade as a centre-back.

== Club career ==
=== Portugal ===
Born in Vila Nova de Gaia, Porto District, Machado spent the vast majority of his youth career with local S.C. Dragões Sandinenses. He made his debut as a senior in 2007 with A.D. Machico in the third division, signing with C.S. Marítimo B in the same league after one season.

In the summer of 2010, Machado was loaned by C.S. Marítimo to C.D. Feirense of the Segunda Liga. He appeared in his first game as a professional on 12 September, starting in a 2–2 away draw against F.C. Arouca.

=== Romania ===
Machado competed in Romania and its Liga I the following years, starting out at FC Brașov. On 13 February 2015, he signed a two-and-a-half-year contract with fellow top-division team FC Dinamo București.

Machado's first top-flight match occurred on 31 October 2011 while at the service of the former club, when he played the entire 1–2 home loss to CFR Cluj. His first goal was scored the following 4 May, helping the hosts to defeat CSU Voința Sibiu 3–0.

In the 2012–13 campaign, Machado scored a career-best five goals for Brașov, helping the side to the seventh position.

=== Al Taawoun ===
Machado joined Saudi Pro League's Al Taawoun FC in 2015. On 5 December 2017, he agreed to a two-year extension.

In July 2020, Machado announced his decision to leave, citing a "need for a new challenge".

=== Later years ===
On 25 January 2021, aged 32, Machado returned to Portugal and its second tier by joining F.C. Penafiel on a short-term deal. After several months of inactivity, he signed with Académico de Viseu F.C. in the same level, reuniting with manager Pedro Ribeiro.

Machado moved back to Saudi Arabia in July 2022, with Al-Sahel SC of the First Division League. One year later, he joined Portuguese amateurs Florgrade FC.

== Career statistics ==
As of match played 31 May 2023

Appearances and goals by club, season and competition
Club	Season	League			National cup		League cup		Continental		Other		Total	
Club	Season	Division	Apps	Goals	Apps	Goals	Apps	Goals	Apps	Goals	Apps	Goals	Apps	Goals
Feirense (loan)	2010–11	Liga de Honra	13	1	0	0	0	0	—		—		13	1
Braşov	2011–12	Liga I	17	1	2	1	—		—		—		19	2
Braşov	2012–13	Liga I	29	5	2	0	—		—		—		31	5
Braşov	2013–14	Liga I	31	1	2	0	—		—		—		33	1
Braşov	2014–15	Liga I	13	1	1	0	1	0	—		—		15	1
Braşov	Total		90	8	7	1	1	0	—		—		98	9
Dinamo București	2014–15	Liga I	6	0	—		0	0	—		—		6	0
Al-Taawoun	2015–16	Saudi Professional League	26	2	0	0	—		—		1	0	27	2
Al-Taawoun	2016–17	Saudi Professional League	23	3	4	2	—		6	1	1	0	34	6
Al-Taawoun	2017–18	Saudi Professional League	18	2	1	0	—		—		1	0	20	2
Al-Taawoun	2018–19	Saudi Professional League	23	1	4	0	—		—		—		27	1
Al-Taawoun	2019–20	Saudi Professional League	28	0	1	0	—		—		1	0	30	0
Al-Taawoun	Total		118	8	10	2	—		6	1	4	0	138	11
Penafiel	2020–21	Liga Portugal 2	5	0	—		—		—		—		5	0
Académico Viseu	2021–22	Liga Portugal 2	15	1	—		—		—		—		15	1
Al-Sahel	2022–23	First Division League	25	1	—		—		—		—		25	1
Career total			267	19	17	3	1	0	6	1	4	0	295	23

== Honours ==
Al Taawoun

- King's Cup: 2019
