= Abdulrahman Al-Shammari (footballer, born 1989) =

Saudi Arabian footballer

Personal information
- Full name: Abdulrahman Hassan Al-Shammari
- Date of birth: February 23, 1989 (age 37)
- Place of birth: Ha'il, Saudi Arabia
- Position: Right back

Youth career
- 2006–2009: Al-Tai

Senior career*
Years	Team	Apps	(Gls)
2009–2015	Al-Tai		
2014–2015	→ Al-Orobah (loan)	20	(0)
2015–2017	Al-Nassr	2	(0)
2016	→ Al-Ettifaq (loan)	10	(0)
2016–2017	→ Al-Taawon (loan)	9	(0)
2017	→ Al-Raed (loan)	3	(0)
2017–2019	Al-Raed	6	(0)
2018–2019	→ Al-Orobah (loan)	5	(0)
2019–2020	Al-Tai	14	(0)
2020–2021	Al-Rawdhah		
- * Club domestic league appearances and goals as of 31 August 2018

Abdulrahman Hassan Al-Shammari (Arabic: عبد الرحمن حسن الشمري) is a football player, who plays as a right back in Saudi Arabia.

He joined Al-Nasr in the Winter of 2015, having left the Al-Tai club of Ha'il.
