= Naif Al-Mousa =

Saudi Arabian footballer

Personal information
- Full name: Naif Al-Mousa
- Date of birth: November 21, 1986 (age 39)
- Place of birth: Saudi Arabia
- Height: 1.66 m (5 ft 5 in)
- Position: Left-back

Youth career
- Al-Shabab

Senior career*
Years	Team	Apps	(Gls)
2007–2008	Al-Shabab		
2008–2014	Al-Hazem		
2014–2019	Al-Taawoun	93	(10)
2019–2020	Al-Hazem	10	(0)
2022–2023	Bisha		
2023–2024	Al-Houra		
- * Club domestic league appearances and goals

Naif Al-Mousa (Arabic: نايف الموسى; born 21 November 1986) is a Saudi Arabian footballer who currently plays as a left-back.
