= Fahad Al-Shammari =

Saudi Arabian footballer

Personal information
- Full name: Fahad Al-Shammari
- Date of birth: May 5, 1981 (age 45)
- Place of birth: Haʼil, Saudi Arabia
- Height: 1.81 m (5 ft 11 1/2 in)
- Position: Goalkeeper

Youth career
- 2000–2001: Al-Ta'ee

Senior career*
Years	Team	Apps	(Gls)
2001–2006	Al-Ta'ee		
2005	→ Al-Ahli (loan)	0	(0)
2006–2014	Al-Hilal	2	(0)
2009–2010	→ Al-Qadisiyah (loan)		
2014–2016	Al-Raed	26	(0)
2016–2017	Al-Taawon	19	(0)
2017–2020	Al-Fayha	7	(0)
- * Club domestic league appearances and goals as of 12 April 2018

Fahad Al-Shammari (Arabic: فهد الشمري; born May 5, 1981, in Riyadh) is a Saudi Arabian footballer who plays as a goalkeeper .

He was a reserve goalkeeper for Al Hilal in the 2009 AFC Champions League group stages.
