= Saeed Al-Dossari =

Saudi Arabian footballer (born 1980)

Personal information
- Full name: Saeed Mohammed Al-Dossari
- Date of birth: June 15, 1990 (age 36)
- Place of birth: Riyadh, Saudi Arabia
- Height: 1.78 m (5 ft 10 in)
- Position: Winger

Youth career
- Al-Shabab

Senior career*
Years	Team	Apps	(Gls)
2011–2016	Al-Shabab	53	(4)
2016–2019	Al-Taawon	59	(5)
2019	Al-Hazem	6	(0)
2019–2020	Al-Fateh	13	(0)
2020–2021	Al-Kawkab	34	(10)
2021–2022	Al-Orobah	37	(2)
2023	Al-Shoulla	7	(0)
2023–2024	Al-Lewaa		
- * Club domestic league appearances and goals

Saeed Al-Dossari (Arabic: سعيد الدوسري, born 15 June 1990) is a Saudi Arabian football player who plays as a winger.
