= Mahmoud Muaaz =

Saudi Arabian footballer

Personal information
- Full name: Mahmoud Muaaz Hawsah
- Date of birth: October 26, 1984 (age 42)
- Place of birth: Saudi Arabia
- Height: 1.80 m (5 ft 11 in)
- Position: Defender

Youth career
- Al-Ansar

Senior career*
Years	Team	Apps	(Gls)
2005–2008	Al-Ansar		
2008–2012	Al-Ahli	14	(0)
2012	→ Al-Faisaly (loan)	0	(0)
2012–2013	Najran SC	18	(0)
2013–2017	Al-Taawon	78	(1)
2017–2018	Al-Wehda	15	(0)
2018–2019	Al-Ansar	29	(0)
2019–2021	Al-Bukayriyah	42	(0)
2021–2023	Al-Ansar		
2023–2024	Wej		
- * Club domestic league appearances and goals as of 20 September 2020

Mahmoud Muaaz (Arabic: محمود معاذ; born 26 October 1984) is a Saudi professional footballer who currently plays as a defender.

== Honours ==
Al-Ahli

- King Cup: 2011, 2012

Al-Wehda

- Prince Mohammad bin Salman League: 2017–18
