= Abdulrahman Al-Barakah =

Saudi Arabian footballer

Personal information
- Full name: Abdulrahman Al-Barakah Eda
- Date of birth: September 21, 1990 (age 36)
- Place of birth: Saudi Arabia
- Height: 1.73 m (5 ft 8 in)
- Position: Midfielder

Team information
- Current team: Al-Bukiryah
- Number: 6

Senior career*
Years	Team	Apps	(Gls)
2012–2015	Al Shabab	0	(0)
2012–2013	→ Al-Shoalah (loan)	7	(1)
2014–2015	→ Al-Raed (loan)	18	(0)
2015–2017	Al-Taawoun	27	(0)
2017–2020	Al-Fayha	56	(1)
2020–2023	Abha	40	(1)
2024	Al-Riyadh	0	(0)
2024–	Al-Bukiryah		
- * Club domestic league appearances and goals as of 12 April 2018

Abdulrahman Al-Barakah is a Saudi Arabian professional football player who currently plays as a midfielder for Al-Bukiryah.

== Career ==
On 23 January 2013, Al-Barakah joined Al-Shoalah on loan from Al-Shabab .

On 14 July 2024, Al-Barakah joined First Division side Al-Bukiryah.
