= 2019–20 Al-Taawoun FC season =

Al-Taawoun
2019–20 season
- President: Mohammed Al-Qassem
- Manager: Paulo Sérgio (until 29 December); Vítor Campelos (from 15 January until 30 August); Abdullah Asiri (from 30 August)
- Stadium: King Abdullah Sport City Stadium
- SPL: 12th
- King Cup: Round of 16
- Super Cup: Runners-up
- ACL: Round of 16
- Top goalscorer: League: Héldon Ramos (7); All: Héldon Ramos (8)
- Highest home attendance: 15,650 vs Al-Hilal (27 February 2020)
- Lowest home attendance: 1,545 vs Al-Wehda (19 December 2019)
- Average home league attendance: 4,661
Home colours	Away colours
- All statistics correct as of 27 September 2020.

The 2019–20 season was Al-Taawoun's 64th year in their history and 10th consecutive season in the Pro League. This season Al-Taawoun participated in the Pro League, the King Cup, the Saudi Super Cup, and the 2020 AFC Champions League.

The season covers the period from 1 July 2019 to 27 September 2020.

== Players ==
=== Squad information ===
As of 4 February 2019

Note: Flags indicate national team as defined under FIFA eligibility rules; some limited exceptions apply. Players may hold more than one non-FIFA nationality.

No.	Pos.	Nation	Player
1	GK	BRA	Cássio
2	DF	KSA	Yassin Barnawi
3	FW	CMR	Léandre Tawamba
4	DF	POR	Ricardo Machado
5	DF	KSA	Talal Al-Absi (captain)
6	MF	KSA	Ryan Al-Mousa
7	MF	KSA	Rabee Sufyani
8	MF	BRA	Nildo Petrolina
11	MF	KSA	Nasser Al-Daajani (on loan from Al-Ahli)
13	DF	KSA	Ibrahim Al-Zubaidi
14	DF	KSA	Hassan Kadesh
15	MF	KSA	Fahad Al-Rashidi
16	DF	KSA	Fahad Al-Hamad
17	MF	BDI	Cédric Amissi
19	MF	KSA	Ibrahim Al-Otaybi
20	MF	CPV	Héldon Ramos
21	GK	KSA	Moataz Al-Baqaawi

No.	Pos.	Nation	Player
23	GK	KSA	Hussain Shae'an
24	FW	KSA	Mohammad Al-Sahlawi
25	DF	KSA	Faisal Darwish
26	GK	KSA	Mohammed Al-Dhulayfi
27	MF	KSA	Sultan Mandash (on loan from Al-Ahli)
28	MF	KSA	Sumayhan Al-Nabit
30	MF	KSA	Nawaf Al-Rashwodi
31	DF	KSA	Saad Balobaid
33	DF	KSA	Ahmed Assiri
41	MF	KSA	Thaar Al-Otaibi (on loan from Al-Hilal)
44	MF	KSA	Saleh Al-Saeed
55	MF	BRA	Sandro Manoel
66	MF	KSA	Mohammed Abousaban
80	MF	KSA	Abdulmajeed Al-Sawat
88	DF	KSA	Hamdan Al-Ruwaili
99	FW	KSA	Malek Al-Abdulmenem

==== Out on loan ====
Note: Flags indicate national team as defined under FIFA eligibility rules; some limited exceptions apply. Players may hold more than one non-FIFA nationality.

No. / Pos. / Nation / Player; 9 / FW / KSA / Mansour Al-Muwallad (at Damac until 9 September 2020)	No. / Pos. / Nation / Player; 29 / MF / KSA / Abdullah Al-Jouei (at Damac until 9 September 2020)

== Transfers and loans ==
=== Transfers in ===
Entry date	Position	No.	Player	From club	Fee	Ref.
30 June 2019	MF	12	(Brazil) Jhonnattann	(Saudi Arabia) Al-Batin	End of loan	
30 June 2019	MF	77	(Saudi Arabia) Mohammed Harzan	(Saudi Arabia) Al-Hazem	End of loan	
1 July 2019	DF	33	(Saudi Arabia) Ahmed Assiri	(Saudi Arabia) Al-Ittihad	Free	
18 July 2019	DF	2	(Saudi Arabia) Yassin Barnawi	(Saudi Arabia) Al-Qadsiah	Free	
17 August 2019	MF	15	(Saudi Arabia) Fahad Al-Rashidi	(Saudi Arabia) Al-Hilal	Free	
10 January 2020	DF	25	(Saudi Arabia) Faisal Darwish	(Saudi Arabia) Al-Wehda	Free	
21 January 2020	DF	14	(Saudi Arabia) Hassan Kadesh	(Saudi Arabia) Al-Hilal	Free	
22 January 2020	FW	24	(Saudi Arabia) Mohammad Al-Sahlawi	(Saudi Arabia) Al-Shabab	Free	
25 January 2020	MF	66	(Saudi Arabia) Mohammed Abousaban	(Saudi Arabia) Damac	Undisclosed	
29 January 2020	FW	99	(Saudi Arabia) Malek Al-Abdulmenem	(Saudi Arabia) Al-Kholood	Free	
1 February 2020	MF	28	(Saudi Arabia) Sumayhan Al-Nabit	(Saudi Arabia) Abha	$533,000	

=== Loans in ===
Start date	End date	Position	No.	Player	To club	Fee	Ref.
24 August 2019	31 January 2020	DF	12	(Saudi Arabia) Mohammed Al-Shanqiti	(Saudi Arabia) Al-Nassr	None	
10 January 2020	End of season	MF	27	(Saudi Arabia) Sultan Mandash	(Saudi Arabia) Al-Ahli	None	
28 January 2020	End of season	MF	41	(Saudi Arabia) Thaar Al-Otaibi	(Saudi Arabia) Al-Hilal	None	

=== Transfers out ===
Exit date	Position	No.	Player	To club	Fee	Ref.
30 June 2019	DF	32	(Saudi Arabia) Muteb Al-Mufarrij	(Saudi Arabia) Al-Hilal	End of loan	
30 June 2019	DF	70	(Saudi Arabia) Mohammed Bassas	(Saudi Arabia) Al-Ahli	End of loan	
9 July 2019	DF	16	(Saudi Arabia) Naif Al-Mousa	(Saudi Arabia) Al-Hazem	Free	
13 July 2019	FW	9	(Saudi Arabia) Abdulfattah Adam	(Saudi Arabia) Al-Nassr	$6,700,000	
16 July 2019	MF	12	(Brazil) Jhonnattann	(United Arab Emirates) Fujairah	Free	
22 August 2019	MF	10	(Syria) Jehad Al-Hussain	(Saudi Arabia) Al-Raed	Free	
28 September 2019	DF	2	(Saudi Arabia) Abdulaziz Al-Moghir	(Saudi Arabia) Al-Saqer	Free	
19 January 2020	MF	35	(Saudi Arabia) Yahya Kharmi		Released	
20 January 2020	MF	77	(Saudi Arabia) Mohammed Harzan	(Saudi Arabia) Damac	Free	
21 January 2020	DF	18	(Saudi Arabia) Madallah Al-Olayan	(Saudi Arabia) Al-Hilal	Free	

=== Loans out ===
Start date	End date	Position	No.	Player	To club	Fee	Ref.
21 January 2020	End of season	MF	29	(Saudi Arabia) Abdullah Al-Jouei	(Saudi Arabia) Damac	None	
31 January 2020	End of season	FW	9	(Saudi Arabia) Mansour Al-Muwallad	(Saudi Arabia) Damac	None	

== Competitions ==
=== Overview ===
Competition	Record							
Competition	G	W	D	L	GF	GA	GD	Win %
Pro League	30	10	5	15	33	40	−7	33.33
King Cup	3	2	0	1	5	1	+4	66.67
Champions League	7	3	0	4	4	9	−5	42.86
Super Cup	1	0	1	0	1	1	+0	0.00
Total	41	15	6	20	43	51	−8	36.59

Updated to match played 27 September 2020
Source: Competitions

=== Pro League ===
==== League table ====
Pos	Team	Pld	W	D	L	GF	GA	GD	Pts	Qualification or relegation
10	Damac	30	9	8	13	37	52	−15	35 (Note: Positions determined by head-to-head points: Damac: 9 pts; Al-Ittihad: 6 pts; Al-Taawoun: 3 pts.)	
11	Al-Ittihad	30	9	8	13	42	41	+1	35	
12	Al-Taawoun	30	10	5	15	33	40	−7	35	
13	Al-Fateh	30	8	9	13	42	49	−7	33	
14	Al-Fayha (R)	30	8	8	14	34	44	−10	32	Relegation to Prince Mohammad bin Salman League

Updated to match(es) played on 9 September 2020. Source: spl.com
Rules for classification: 1) Points; 2) Head-to-head points; 3) Head-to-head goal difference; 4) Total goal difference; 5) Total goals scored; 6) Fair-play points (Note: Head-to-head record is used only after all the matches between the teams in question have been played).
(R) Relegated

==== Results summary ====
Overall								Home						Away					
Pld	W	D	L	GF	GA	GD	Pts	W	D	L	GF	GA	GD	W	D	L	GF	GA	GD
30	10	5	15	33	40	−7	35	8	2	5	19	18	+1	2	3	10	14	22	−8

Last updated: 9 September 2020.
Source: spl.sa

==== Results by round ====
Round	1	2	3	4	5	6	7	8	9	10	11	12	13	14	15	16	17	18	19	20	21	22	23	24	25	26	27	28	29	30
Ground	H	A	H	A	A	H	A	H	H	A	A	H	A	H	A	A	H	A	H	H	A	H	A	A	H	H	A	H	A	H
Result	D	L	W	W	L	W	L	W	W	W	L	W	L	W	D	D	L	D	D	L	L	W	L	L	L	L	L	L	L	W
Position	6	11	8	10	13	10	11	9	8	4	6	3	6	5	5	4	5	6	6	7	8	6	10	10	10	10	10	10	12	12

Updated to match(es) played on 9 September 2022. Source: spl.com.sa
A = Away; H = Home; W = Win; D = Draw; L = Loss

==== Matches ====
All times are local, AST (UTC+3).

Win Draw Loss Postponed

23 August 2019 1	Al-Taawoun	1–1	Al-Hazem	Buraidah
19:10	Amissi (yellow card) 23'; Héldon 45+4'; Sandro Manoel (yellow card) 45+6'	Report	Bakheet (yellow card) 9' (yellow-red card) 62'; Muralha (yellow card) 25'; Barnawi 34' (o.g.); Al-Mousa (yellow card) 81'	Stadium: King Abdullah Sport City Stadium; Attendance: 2,129; Referee: Luís Godinho (Portugal)

13 September 2019 3	Al-Taawoun	3–2	Al-Adalah	Buraidah
18:50	Al-Absi 31'; Amissi (yellow card) 54'; Petrolina 70'; Al-Muwallad 84'	Report	Al-Burayh (yellow card) 29'; Cissé 39'; Andriamatsinoro 45+3'; Al-Radhi (yellow card) 56'	Stadium: King Abdullah Sport City Stadium; Attendance: 2,119; Referee: Bas Nijhuis (Netherlands)

26 September 2019 5	Al-Hilal	2–1	Al-Taawoun	Riyadh
20:15	Kharbin 9'; Al-Mousa 68' (o.g.)	Report	Amissi 4', (yellow card) 12'; Petrolina (yellow card) 56'; Al-Absi (yellow card) 72'	Stadium: King Saud University Stadium; Attendance: 17,989; Referee: Ovidiu Hațegan (Romania)

1 October 2019 2	Al-Ittihad	3–1	Al-Taawoun	Jeddah
20:10	Al-Bishi 4'; Vecchio 34'; Romarinho 59'; Al-Harbi (yellow card) 82'	Report	Machado (yellow card) 45+5'; Al-Shanqeeti (yellow card) 55'; Tawamba 67'	Stadium: King Abdullah Sports City; Attendance: 10,350; Referee: Anastasios Sidiropoulos (Greece)

5 October 2019 6	Al-Taawoun	1–0	Abha	Buraidah
20:10	Al-Olayan (yellow card) 86'; Sandro Manoel 90+4'; Al-Daajani (yellow card) 90+4'	Report	Tahrat (yellow card) 23'; Al-Nabit (yellow card) 71'; Barnawi (yellow card) 90+2' (yellow-red card) 90+7'	Stadium: King Abdullah Sports City Stadium; Attendance: 2,001; Referee: Matej Jug (Slovenia)

18 October 2019 7	Al-Ahli	3–1	Al-Taawoun	Jeddah
20:00	A. Asiri 22'; Lucas Lima (yellow card) 39'; Djaniny 44'; Al-Mogahwi (yellow card) 50'; Sarić (yellow card) 52'; Al Somah 70'; Al-Owais (yellow card) 84'	Report	Héldon 10'; Assiri (yellow card) 23'; Al-Mousa (yellow card) 33'	Stadium: King Abdullah Sports City; Attendance: 9,431; Referee: Jorge Sousa (Portugal)

26 October 2019 8	Al-Taawoun	2–1	Al-Faisaly	Buraidah
18:05	Tawamba 44'; Amissi (yellow card) 49'; Rossi 63' (o.g.); Al-Zubaidi (yellow card) 82'	Report	Silva (yellow card) 60'; Rossi 80'	Stadium: King Abdullah Sport City Stadium; Attendance: 2,109; Referee: Ivan Kružliak (Slovakia)

2 November 2019 9	Al-Taawoun	3–1	Al-Shabab	Buraidah
18:00	Héldon 18' (pen.); Al-Swat 70'; Tawamba 80'	Report	Salem (yellow card) 17'; N'Diaye (yellow card) 24'; Asprilla 47'	Stadium: King Abdullah Sport City Stadium; Attendance: 3,566; Referee: Hugo Miguel (Portugal)

6 November 2019 4	Al-Raed	0–3	Al-Taawoun	Buraidah
18:00	Daoudi (yellow card) 49'; Al-Zain (yellow card) 70'; Al-Showaish (yellow card) 88'	Report	Al-Olayan 2', (yellow card) 45' (yellow-red card) 62'; Al-Swat 18'; Héldon (yellow card) 55' (yellow-red card) 90+1', (goal) 90' (pen.); Barnawi (yellow card) 86'	Stadium: King Abdullah Sport City Stadium; Attendance: 11,320; Referee: Ivan Bebek (Croatia)

23 November 2019 10	Damac	1–2	Al-Taawoun	Abha
15:30	Al-Jayzani (yellow card) 44'; Fellipe 49'; Abousaban (yellow card) 59'; Hazzazi (yellow card) 79'	Report	Manoel 45+1' (pen.), 90+7' (pen.), (yellow card) 86'; Cássio (yellow card) 50'; Al-Mousa (yellow card) 57'; Barnawi (yellow card) 87'	Stadium: Prince Sultan bin Abdul Aziz Stadium; Attendance: 3,644; Referee: Luis Branco Godinho (Portugal)

13 December 2019 11	Al-Nassr	2–1	Al-Taawoun	Riyadh
19:45	Giuliano 31'; Adam 38'	Report	Amissi 19', (yellow card) 75'; Al-Olayan (yellow card) 24' (yellow-red card) 82'; Machado (yellow card) 57'; Al-Absi (yellow card) 83'	Stadium: Prince Faisal bin Fahd Stadium; Attendance: 15,297; Referee: Björn Kuipers (Netherlands)

19 December 2019 12	Al-Taawoun	2–1	Al-Wehda	Buraidah
17:55	Petrolina 9'; Al-Swat 65'	Report	Niakaté 37'; Al-Nemer (yellow card) 74'	Stadium: King Abdullah Sport City Stadium; Attendance: 1,545; Referee: Serdar Gözübüyük (Netherlands)

28 December 2019 13	Al-Ettifaq	1–0	Al-Taawoun	Dammam
17:35	Hazazi (yellow card) 21'; Al-Ghamdi (yellow card) 45'; Al-Hazaa 65'; M'Bolhi (yellow card) 88'	Report	Al-Olayan (yellow card) 45+2'; Héldon (yellow card) 55'; Tawamba (yellow card) 68'; Al-Absi (yellow card) 90'	Stadium: Prince Mohamed bin Fahd Stadium; Attendance: 2,445; Referee: Ivan Kružliak (Slovakia)

10 January 2020 14	Al-Taawoun	2–1	Al-Fateh	Buraidah
18:05	Amissi 21', 90+4'	Report	Al-Zaqaan 37'	Stadium: King Abdullah Sport City Stadium; Attendance: 1,678; Referee: Khaled Al-Turais

24 January 2020 15	Al-Fayha	2–2	Al-Taawoun	Al Majma'ah
15:35	Arsénio (yellow card) 21'; Villanueva 30'; Alhaj 90'	Report	Héldon 19', (yellow card) 40'; Al-Absi 45+6'; Amissi (red card) 75'	Stadium: Al Majma'ah Sports City; Attendance: 4,057; Referee: Faisal Al-Blwi

31 January 2020 16	Al-Hazem	0–0	Al-Taawoun	Ar Rass
18:25	Al-Khalaf (yellow card) 14'	Report	Abousaban (yellow card) 12'; Darwish (yellow card) 45+3'	Stadium: Al-Hazem Club Stadium; Attendance: 3,224; Referee: Khaled Al-Teris

5 February 2020 17	Al-Taawoun	1–2	Al-Ittihad	Buraidah
18:25	Héldon 44', (yellow card) 83'; Cássio (yellow card) 81'; Machado (yellow card) 85'	Report	Abdulhamid 28', (yellow card) 47'; Uvini 31'; Gil (yellow card) 45+2'; Al-Malki (yellow card) 81'; Grohe (yellow card) 90+1'; Al-Aryani (yellow card) 90+3'	Stadium: King Abdullah Sport City Stadium; Attendance: 5,986; Referee: István Kovács (Romania)

14 February 2020 18	Al-Adalah	0–0	Al-Taawoun	Al-Hasa
15:30	Ogu (yellow card) 44'	Report	Barnawi (yellow card) 57'	Stadium: Prince Abdullah bin Jalawi Stadium; Attendance: 12,819; Referee: Majed Al-Shamrani

22 February 2020 19	Al-Taawoun	1–1	Al-Raed	Buraidah
16:00	Al-Sahlawi 35'; Barnawi (yellow card) 41' Assiri (yellow card) 66'; Amissi (yellow card) 68'; Abousaban (yellow card) 82'; Cássio (yellow card) 90+4'	Report	Fouzair 69' (pen.); Al-Ghamdi (yellow card) 81'; Al-Amri (yellow card) 90+4'	Stadium: King Abdullah Sport City Stadium; Attendance: 9,819; Referee: Serdar Gözübüyük (Netherlands)

27 February 2020 20	Al-Taawoun	0–1	Al-Hilal	Buraidah
18:40	Darwish (yellow card) 5'; Abousaban (yellow card) 37'	Report	Hyun-soo (yellow card) 10'; Al-Dawsari 16'; Jahfali (yellow card) 47'; Gomis (yellow card) 88'; Giovinco (yellow card) 90'	Stadium: King Abdullah Sport City Stadium; Attendance: 15,650; Referee: Slavko Vinčić (Slovenia)

7 March 2020 21	Abha	2–1	Al-Taawoun	Abha
16:15	Al Abbas 2'; Al-Qeed (yellow card) 42'; Al-Habib (yellow card) 75'; Atouchi 79', (yellow card) 90+4'	Report	Al-Rashidi (yellow card) 66'; Sufyani 86'	Stadium: Prince Sultan bin Abdul Aziz Stadium; Attendance: 0 (Note: Matches from 7 March and onwards will be played behind closed doors due to concerns over the coronavirus outbreak.); Referee: Tamás Bognár (Hungary)

12 March 2020 22	Al-Taawoun	1–0	Al-Ahli	Buraidah
20:40	Petrolina 10'; Cássio (yellow card) 83'; Kadesh (yellow card) 90+4'	Report	Souza (yellow card) 69'	Stadium: King Abdullah Sport City Stadium; Attendance: 0 Referee: Srđan Jovanović (Serbia)

4 August 2020 23	Al-Faisaly	2–1	Al-Taawoun	Al Majma'ah
20:45	Ashraf 9'; Al-Qahtani (yellow card) 54'; Guilherme 70'; Hyland (yellow card) 73'; Al-Hassan (yellow card) 83'	Report	Amissi 63'; Al-Nabit (yellow card) 90+4'; Al-Absi (yellow card) 90+5'	Stadium: Al Majma'ah Sports City; Attendance: 0 Referee: Faisal Al-Blwi

10 August 2020 24	Al-Shabab	1–0	Al-Taawoun	Riyadh
19:05	Al-Shamekh (yellow card) 6'; Al-Sulayhem (yellow card) 34', (goal) 67'; Salem (yellow card) 81'; Al-Zori (yellow card) 90+7'	Report	Petrolina (yellow card) 20'; Amissi (yellow card) 27'; Manoel (yellow card) 89'; Assiri (yellow card) 90+8'	Stadium: Prince Faisal bin Fahd Stadium; Attendance: 0 Referee: Tamás Bognár (Hungary)

15 August 2020 25	Al-Taawoun	0–2	Damac	Buraidah
19:15	Al-Abdulmenem (yellow card) 72'; Assiri (yellow card) 82'; Mendash (yellow card) 85'; Al-Mousa (yellow card) 89'	Report	Saidani 45'; Chafaï 56'; Al-Najei (yellow card) 90+5'	Stadium: King Abdullah Sport City Stadium; Attendance: 0 Referee: Georgi Kabakov (Bulgaria)

20 August 2020 26	Al-Taawoun	1–4	Al-Nassr	Buraidah
19:10	Héldon 54'	Report	Hamdallah 5', 49', 81' (pen.); Amrabat 17', (yellow card) 55'	Stadium: King Abdullah Sport City Stadium; Attendance: 0 Referee: Néstor Pitana (Argentina)

25 August 2020 27	Al-Wehda	2–1	Al-Taawoun	Mecca
19:20	Luisinho 15'; Niakaté 25'; Al-Jayzani (yellow card) 30'; Botía (yellow card) 53'; Bakshween (yellow card) 90'	Report	Amissi 7'; Assiri (yellow card) 21'; Al-Ruwaili (yellow card) 41'; Mendash (yellow card) 43'; Al-Zubaidi (yellow card) 72'	Stadium: King Abdul Aziz Stadium; Attendance: 0 Referee: David Roome (Scotland)

30 August 2020 28	Al-Taawoun	0–1	Al-Ettifaq	Buraidah
19:00	Amissi (yellow card) 24' (yellow-red card) 90+1'; Al-Ruwaili (yellow card) 33'; Al-Mousa (yellow card) 86'	Report	Al Salem 34'; Kiss (yellow card) 39'	Stadium: King Abdullah Sport City Stadium; Attendance: 0 Referee: Shukri Al-Hanfoush

4 September 2020 29	Al-Fateh	1–0	Al-Taawoun	Al-Hasa
20:35	Saâdane (yellow card) 50'; Bendebka (yellow card) 65' te Vrede 81'; Majrashi (yellow card) 88'; Al-Zaqaan (yellow card) 90+5'	Report	Mendash (yellow card) 28'; Petrolina (yellow card) 57'; Sandro (yellow card) 70'	Stadium: Prince Abdullah bin Jalawi Stadium; Attendance: 0 Referee: Gediminas Mažeika (Lithuania)

9 September 2020 30	Al-Taawoun	1–0	Al-Fayha	Buraidah
20:35	Al-Mousa (yellow card) 38'; Al-Sahlawi 90+2'	Report	Al-Khaibari (yellow card) 15'; Neto (yellow card) 66' (yellow-red card) 68'; Villanueva (yellow card) 69'; Owusu (yellow card) 71'	Stadium: King Abdullah Sport City Stadium; Attendance: 0 Referee: Andrés Cunha (Uruguay)

=== King Cup ===
All times are local, AST (UTC+3).

10 November 2019 Round of 64	Al-Taawoun	3–0	Al-Lewaa	Buraidah
17:55	Al-Daajani 32'; Al-Muwallad 48', 78'	Report		Stadium: Al-Taawoun Club Stadium; Referee: Abdullah Dhafer

6 December 2019 Round of 32	Al-Ain	0–2	Al-Taawoun	Al Bahah
15:35	Ouattara (yellow card) 85'	Report	Héldon 21'; Petrolina 60'	Stadium: King Saud Sport City Stadium; Referee: Khaled Al-Teris

23 December 2019 Round of 16	Abha	1–0	Al-Taawoun	Abha
15:40	Al-Najei 41', (yellow card) 41'; Al-Nabit (yellow card) 83'	Report	Amissi (yellow card) 90+4'	Stadium: Prince Sultan bin Abdul Aziz Stadium; Referee: Artur Soares Dias (Portugal)

=== Saudi Super Cup ===
4 January 2020 Final	Al-Nassr	1–1 (5–4 p)	Al-Taawoun	Jeddah, Saudi Arabia
20:15 AST	Al-Khaibari (yellow card) 54'; Hamdallah 58'	Report	Tawamba 18'; Petrolina (yellow card) 35'; Al-Absi (yellow card) 40'; Al-Mousa (yellow card) 54'; Sandro Manoel (yellow card) 65'; Amissi (yellow card) 68'; Machado (yellow card) 90+2'; Al-Olayan (yellow card) 90+7'	Stadium: King Abdullah Sports City; Attendance: 40,514; Referee: Danny Makkelie (Netherlands)
	Penalties
	Hamdallah (penalty scored); Giuliano (penalty scored); Amrabat (penalty missed); Yahya Al-Shehri (penalty scored); Adam (penalty scored); Maicon (penalty scored)		(penalty scored) Sandro Manoel; (penalty scored) Petrolina; (penalty scored) Amissi; (penalty missed) Machado; (penalty scored) Héldon; (penalty missed) Al-Absi

=== Champions League ===
==== Group stage ====
The group stage draw was made on 10 December 2019 in Kuala Lumpur.

Pos	Team	Pld	W	D	L	GF	GA	GD	Pts	Qualification	PRS	TAW	DUH	SHJ
1	(Iran) Persepolis	6	3	1	2	8	5	+3	10	Advance to knockout stage	—	1–0	0–1	4–0
2	(Saudi Arabia) Al-Taawoun	6	3	0	3	4	8	−4	9 (Note: Head-to-head points: Al-Taawoun 6, Al-Duhail 0.)	Advance to knockout stage	0–1	—	2–0	0–6
3	(Qatar) Al-Duhail	6	3	0	3	7	8	−1	9		2–0	0–1	—	2–1
4	(United Arab Emirates) Sharjah	6	2	1	3	13	11	+2	7		2–2	0–1	4–2	—

Source: AFC
Rules for classification: Tiebreakers
Notes:

11 February 2020 1	Sharjah (United Arab Emirates)	0–1	(Saudi Arabia) Al-Taawoun	Sharjah, United Arab Emirates
18:55 UTC+4		Live Report; Stats Report	Darwish 34'	Stadium: Sharjah Stadium; Attendance: 8,523; Referee: Ryuji Sato (Japan)

18 February 2020 2	Al-Taawoun (Saudi Arabia)	2–0	(Qatar) Al-Duhail	Buraidah, Saudi Arabia
18:35 UTC+3	Al-Sahlawi 34'; Al-Swat 55'	Live Report; Stats Report		Stadium: King Abdullah Sport City Stadium; Attendance: 15,346; Referee: Adham Makhadmeh (Jordan)

15 September 2020 (Note: On 9 July 2020, AFC announced new schedule for 2020 AFC Champions League group stage. On 16 July 2020, AFC announced that Qatar would host 2020 AFC Champions League in the West region from the group stage to the semi-finals.) 3	Persepolis (Iran)	1–0	(Saudi Arabia) Al-Taawoun	Doha, Qatar
21:00 UTC+3	Khalilzadeh 83'	Live Report; Stats Report		Stadium: Education City Stadium; Attendance: 0 Referee: Ahmed Al-Kaf (Oman)

18 September 2020 4	Al-Taawoun (Saudi Arabia)	0–1	(Iran) Persepolis	Doha, Qatar
21:00 UTC+3		Live Report; Stats Report	Rasan 48' (pen.)	Stadium: Education City Stadium; Attendance: 0 Referee: Mohanad Qasim (Iraq)

21 September 2020 5	Al-Taawoun (Saudi Arabia)	0–6	(United Arab Emirates) Sharjah	Doha, Qatar
21:00 UTC+3		Live Report; Stats Report	Rashid 45+1'; Welliton 49', 57', 61'; Abdulbasit 54'; Caio 68'	Stadium: Education City Stadium; Attendance: 0 Referee: Kim Dae-yong (South Korea)

24 September 2020 6	Al-Duhail (Qatar)	0–1	(Saudi Arabia) Al-Taawoun	Doha, Qatar
21:00 UTC+3		Live Report; Stats Report	Duke 86'	Stadium: Education City Stadium; Attendance: 0 Referee: Mohd Amirul Izwan Yaacob (Malaysia)

==== Knockout phase ====
27 September 2020 Round of 16	Al-Nassr (Saudi Arabia)	1–0	(Saudi Arabia) Al-Taawoun	Doha, Qatar
20:45 UTC+3	Asiri (yellow card) 35'; Hamdallah 75'; Al-Dawsari (yellow card) 90+2'	Live Report; Stats Report	Kadesh (yellow card) 83'; Al-Mousa (yellow card) 89'	Stadium: Education City Stadium; Attendance: 0 Referee: Ali Sabah (Iraq)

== Statistics ==
=== Squad statistics ===
Last updated on 27 September 2020.

No.	Pos	Nat	Player	Total		Pro League		King Cup		Champions League		Super Cup	
No.	Pos	Nat	Player	Apps	Goals	Apps	Goals	Apps	Goals	Apps	Goals	Apps	Goals
Goalkeepers
1	GK	(Brazil)	Cássio	39	0	29	0	2	0	7	0	1	0
21	GK	(Saudi Arabia)	Moataz Al-Baqaawi	0	0	0	0	0	0	0	0	0	0
23	GK	(Saudi Arabia)	Hussain Shae'an	2	0	1	0	1	0	0	0	0	0
26	GK	(Saudi Arabia)	Mohammed Al-Dhulayfi	0	0	0	0	0	0	0	0	0	0
Defenders
2	DF	(Saudi Arabia)	Yassin Barnawi	24	0	12+3	0	2+1	0	6	0	0	0
4	DF	(Portugal)	Ricardo Machado	31	0	28	0	2	0	0	0	1	0
4	DF	(Brazil)	Iago Santos	5	0	0	0	0	0	5	0	0	0
5	DF	(Saudi Arabia)	Talal Al-Absi	26	2	20+2	2	1	0	2	0	1	0
13	DF	(Saudi Arabia)	Ibrahim Al-Zubaidi	10	0	8+2	0	0	0	0	0	0	0
14	DF	(Saudi Arabia)	Hassan Kadesh	14	0	6+3	0	0	0	5	0	0	0
16	DF	(Saudi Arabia)	Fahad Al-Hamad	11	0	4+1	0	1	0	4+1	0	0	0
25	DF	(Saudi Arabia)	Faisal Darwish	15	1	6+5	0	0	0	3+1	1	0	0
31	DF	(Saudi Arabia)	Saad Balobaid	1	0	0	0	0	0	0+1	0	0	0
33	DF	(Saudi Arabia)	Ahmed Assiri	35	0	20+5	0	3	0	6	0	0+1	0
88	DF	(Saudi Arabia)	Hamdan Al-Ruwaili	6	0	2+3	0	0	0	1	0	0	0
Midfielders
6	MF	(Saudi Arabia)	Ryan Al-Mousa	24	0	11+5	0	1+1	0	3+2	0	1	0
7	MF	(Saudi Arabia)	Rabee Sufyani	31	1	14+8	1	1+2	0	1+4	0	0+1	0
8	MF	(Brazil)	Nildo Petrolina	26	4	24	3	1	1	0	0	1	0
11	MF	(Saudi Arabia)	Nasser Al-Daajani	13	1	2+6	0	1+1	1	0+3	0	0	0
15	MF	(Saudi Arabia)	Fahad Al-Rashidi	21	0	5+7	0	1+1	0	5+1	0	1	0
17	MF	(Burundi)	Cédric Amissi	34	6	25	6	2	0	6	0	1	0
19	MF	(Saudi Arabia)	Ibrahim Al-Otaybi	1	0	0+1	0	0	0	0	0	0	0
20	MF	(Cape Verde)	Héldon Ramos	28	8	22+3	7	2	1	0	0	1	0
24	MF	(Saudi Arabia)	Sufyan Al-Oufi	1	0	0	0	0+1	0	0	0	0	0
27	MF	(Saudi Arabia)	Sultan Mandash	17	0	7+3	0	0	0	2+5	0	0	0
28	MF	(Saudi Arabia)	Sumayhan Al-Nabit	9	0	4+4	0	0	0	0+1	0	0	0
29	MF	(Saudi Arabia)	Abdullah Al-Jouei	4	0	0	0	1	0	1+2	0	0	0
30	MF	(Saudi Arabia)	Nawaf Al-Rashwodi	0	0	0	0	0	0	0	0	0	0
41	MF	(Saudi Arabia)	Thaar Al-Otaibi	6	0	0+5	0	0	0	0+1	0	0	0
44	MF	(Saudi Arabia)	Saleh Al-Saeed	2	0	0	0	0+1	0	0+1	0	0	0
55	MF	(Brazil)	Sandro Manoel	32	3	28+1	3	2	0	0	0	1	0
66	MF	(Saudi Arabia)	Mohammed Abousaban	12	0	5+2	0	0	0	5	0	0	0
80	MF	(Saudi Arabia)	Abdulmajeed Al-Sawat	28	4	13+8	3	1	0	5+1	1	0	0
Forwards
3	FW	(Cameroon)	Léandre Tawamba	21	4	15+2	3	2	0	0+1	0	1	1
9	FW	(Saudi Arabia)	Mansour Al-Muwallad	12	3	0+7	1	1	2	0+3	0	0+1	0
12	FW	(Australia)	Mitchell Duke	5	1	0	0	0	0	5	1	0	0
24	FW	(Saudi Arabia)	Mohammad Al-Sahlawi	13	3	4+4	2	0	0	5	1	0	0
99	FW	(Saudi Arabia)	Malek Al-Abdulmenem	4	0	2+2	0	0	0	0	0	0	0
Player who made an appearance this season but have left the club
12	DF	(Saudi Arabia)	Mohammed Al-Shanqiti	6	0	2+3	0	1	0	0	0	0	0
18	DF	(Saudi Arabia)	Madallah Al-Olayan	14	1	11	1	2	0	0	0	1	0
77	MF	(Saudi Arabia)	Mohammed Harzan	7	0	0+5	0	1+1	0	0	0	0	0

=== Goalscorers ===
Rank	No.	Pos	Nat	Name	Pro League	King Cup	Champions League	Super Cup	Total
1	20	MF	(Cape Verde)	Héldon Ramos	7	1	0	0	8
2	17	MF	(Burundi)	Cédric Amissi	6	0	0	0	6
3	3	FW	(Cameroon)	Léandre Tawamba	3	0	0	1	4
3	8	MF	(Brazil)	Nildo Petrolina	3	1	0	0	4
3	80	MF	(Saudi Arabia)	Abdulmajeed Al-Sawat	3	0	1	0	4
6	9	FW	(Saudi Arabia)	Mansour Al-Muwallad	1	2	0	0	3
6	24	FW	(Saudi Arabia)	Mohammad Al-Sahlawi	2	0	1	0	3
6	55	MF	(Brazil)	Sandro Manoel	3	0	0	0	3
9	5	DF	(Saudi Arabia)	Talal Al-Absi	2	0	0	0	2
10	7	MF	(Saudi Arabia)	Rabee Sufyani	1	0	0	0	1
10	11	MF	(Saudi Arabia)	Nasser Al-Daajani	0	1	0	0	1
10	12	FW	(Australia)	Mitchell Duke	0	0	1	0	1
10	18	DF	(Saudi Arabia)	Madallah Al-Olayan	1	0	0	0	1
10	25	DF	(Saudi Arabia)	Faisal Darwish	0	0	1	0	1
Own goal					1	0	0	0	1
Total					33	5	4	1	43

Last Updated: 24 September 2020

=== Assists ===
Rank	No.	Pos	Nat	Name	Pro League	King Cup	Champions League	Super Cup	Total
1	20	MF	(Cape Verde)	Héldon Ramos	6	0	0	1	7
2	8	MF	(Brazil)	Nildo Petrolina	4	0	0	0	4
2	17	MF	(Burundi)	Cédric Amissi	3	1	0	0	3
4	3	FW	(Cameroon)	Léandre Tawamba	1	1	0	0	2
4	77	MF	(Saudi Arabia)	Mohammed Harzan	1	1	0	0	2
6	6	MF	(Saudi Arabia)	Ryan Al-Mousa	1	0	0	0	1
6	7	MF	(Saudi Arabia)	Rabee Sufyani	1	0	0	0	1
6	9	FW	(Saudi Arabia)	Mansour Al-Muwallad	0	1	0	0	1
6	11	MF	(Saudi Arabia)	Nasser Al-Daajani	0	1	0	0	1
6	13	DF	(Saudi Arabia)	Ibrahim Al-Zubaidi	1	0	0	0	1
6	15	MF	(Saudi Arabia)	Fahad Al-Rashidi	1	0	0	0	1
6	18	DF	(Saudi Arabia)	Madallah Al-Olayan	1	0	0	0	1
6	24	FW	(Saudi Arabia)	Mohammad Al-Sahlawi	0	0	1	0	1
6	25	DF	(Saudi Arabia)	Faisal Darwish	1	0	0	0	1
6	27	MF	(Saudi Arabia)	Sultan Mandash	0	0	1	0	1
Total					21	5	2	1	29

Last Updated: 24 September 2020

=== Clean sheets ===
Rank	No.	Pos	Nat	Name	Pro League	King Cup	Champions League	Super Cup	Total
1	1	GK	(Brazil)	Cássio	6	1	3	0	10
2	23	GK	(Saudi Arabia)	Hussain Shae'an	0	1	0	0	1
Total					6	2	3	0	11

Last Updated: 24 September 2020
