= 2018–19 Al-Taawoun FC season =

Al-Taawoun
2018–19 season
- President: Mohammed Al-Qassem
- Manager: Pedro Emanuel
- Stadium: King Abdullah Sport City Stadium
- SPL: 3rd
- King Cup: Winners
- Top goalscorer: League: Léandre Tawamba (21); All: Léandre Tawamba (27)
- Highest home attendance: 14,893 vs Al-Hilal (30 December 2018)
- Lowest home attendance: 1,473 vs Al-Hazem (10 January 2019)
- Average home league attendance: 4,444
- All statistics correct as of 16 May 2019.

The 2018–19 season was Al-Taawoun's 63rd year in their history and 9th consecutive season in the Pro League. This season Al-Taawoun participated in the Pro League and King Cup.

The season covers the period from 1 July 2018 to 30 June 2019.

== Players ==
=== Squad information ===
As of 4 February 2019

Note: Flags indicate national team as defined under FIFA eligibility rules; some limited exceptions apply. Players may hold more than one non-FIFA nationality.

No.	Pos.	Nation	Player
1	GK	BRA	Cássio
2	DF	KSA	Abdulaziz Al-Moghir
3	FW	CMR	Léandre Tawamba
4	DF	POR	Ricardo Machado
5	DF	KSA	Talal Al-Absi (captain)
6	MF	KSA	Ryan Al-Mousa
7	MF	KSA	Rabee Sufyani
8	MF	BRA	Nildo Petrolina
9	FW	KSA	Abdulfattah Adam
10	MF	SYR	Jehad Al-Hussain
11	MF	KSA	Nasser Al-Daajani (on loan from Al-Ahli)
13	DF	KSA	Ibrahim Al-Zubaidi
16	DF	KSA	Naif Al-Mousa
17	MF	BDI	Cédric Amissi

No.	Pos.	Nation	Player
18	DF	KSA	Madallah Al-Olayan
19	MF	KSA	Ibrahim Al-Otaybi
20	MF	CPV	Héldon Ramos
21	GK	KSA	Moataz Al-Baqaawi
23	GK	KSA	Hussain Shae'an
25	FW	KSA	Mansour Al-Muwallad
29	MF	KSA	Abdullah Al-Jouei
32	DF	KSA	Muteb Al-Mufarrij (on loan from Al-Hilal)
35	MF	KSA	Yahya Khormi
44	MF	KSA	Saleh Al-Saeed
47	DF	KSA	Mohammed Bassas (on loan from Al-Ahli)
55	MF	BRA	Sandro Manoel
80	MF	KSA	Abdulmajeed Al-Sawat
88	DF	KSA	Hamdan Al-Ruwaili

==== Out on loan ====
Note: Flags indicate national team as defined under FIFA eligibility rules; some limited exceptions apply. Players may hold more than one non-FIFA nationality.

No. / Pos. / Nation / Player; 12 / MF / BRA / Jhonnattann Benites (at Al-Batin until 30 June 2019)	No. / Pos. / Nation / Player; 77 / MF / KSA / Mohammed Harzan (at Al-Hazm until 30 June 2019)

== Transfers ==
=== In ===
Date	Pos.	Name	Previous club	Fee	Source
4 May 2018	MF	(Saudi Arabia) Mohammed Harzan	(Saudi Arabia) Ohod	Free	
30 May 2018	MF	(Saudi Arabia) Abdulaziz Al-Sharid	(Saudi Arabia) Ohod	End of loan	
30 May 2018	MF	(Brazil) Sandro Manoel	(Saudi Arabia) Al-Fateh	End of loan	
10 June 2018	GK	(Brazil) Cássio	(Portugal) Rio Ave	Free	
10 June 2018	MF	(Saudi Arabia) Rabee Sufyani	(Saudi Arabia) Al-Ittihad	Free	
11 July 2018	MF	(Saudi Arabia) Yahya Khormi	(Saudi Arabia) Al-Ittihad	Free	
13 June 2018	MF	(Brazil) Jhonnattann	(Saudi Arabia) Al-Batin	Free	
2 July 2018	MF	(Cape Verde) Héldon Ramos	(Portugal) Sporting	€250,000	
3 July 2018	DF	(Saudi Arabia) Hamdan Al-Ruwaili	(Saudi Arabia) Al-Orobah	Free	
10 July 2018	GK	(Saudi Arabia) Hussain Shae'an	(Saudi Arabia) Al-Nassr	Free	
10 July 2018	FW	(Cameroon) Léandre Tawamba	(Serbia) Partizan	€1,400,000	
1 August 2018	MF	(Saudi Arabia) Ryan Al-Mousa	(Saudi Arabia) Al-Ahli	Free	
10 September 2018	GK	(Saudi Arabia) Abdullah Al-Arraf	(Saudi Arabia) Al-Wehda	Free	
9 January 2019	MF	(Brazil) Nildo Petrolina	(Portugal) Aves	Undisclosed	
3 February 2019	MF	(Saudi Arabia) Abdullah Al-Jouei	(Portugal) Marítimo	Undisclosed	
4 February 2019	FW	(Saudi Arabia) Mansour Al-Muwallad	(Saudi Arabia) Al-Ahli	Free	

=== Loans in ===
Date	Pos.	Name	Parent club	End date	Source
23 August 2018	DF	(Saudi Arabia) Muteb Al-Mufarrij	(Saudi Arabia) Al-Hilal	End of season	
25 January 2019	MF	(Saudi Arabia) Nasser Al-Daajani	(Saudi Arabia) Al-Ahli	30 June 2020	
4 February 2019	DF	(Saudi Arabia) Mohammed Bassas	(Saudi Arabia) Al-Ahli	End of season	

=== Out ===
Date	Pos.	Name	New club	Fee	Source
30 May 2018	DF	(Saudi Arabia) Faisel Al-Kharaa	(Saudi Arabia) Al-Ittihad	End of loan	
30 May 2018	MF	(Saudi Arabia) Abdulaziz Al-Bishi	(Saudi Arabia) Al-Shabab	End of loan	
30 May 2018	MF	(Saudi Arabia) Ryan Al-Mousa	(Saudi Arabia) Al-Ahli	End of loan	
30 May 2018	MF	(Saudi Arabia) Abdulmajeed Al-Ruwaili	(Saudi Arabia) Al-Fayha	End of loan	
30 May 2018	MF	(Egypt) Mostafa Fathi	(Egypt) Zamalek	End of loan	
30 May 2018	MF	(Saudi Arabia) Abdurahman Khairallah	(Saudi Arabia) Al-Shabab	End of loan	
30 May 2018	MF	(Romania) Adrian Popa	(England) Reading	End of loan	
30 May 2018	FW	(Egypt) Emad Moteab	(Egypt) Al-Ahly	End of loan	
9 June 2018	DF	(Saudi Arabia) Abdullah Al-Shammari	(Saudi Arabia) Al-Ittihad	Undisclosed	
18 June 2018	MF	(Saudi Arabia) Abdulaziz Al-Sharid	(Saudi Arabia) Al-Fateh	Free	
2 July 2018	GK	(Egypt) Essam El Hadary	(Egypt) Ismaily	Free	
11 July 2018	GK	(Saudi Arabia) Sultan Al-Ghamdi	(Saudi Arabia) Al-Ain	Free	
19 August 2018	MF	(Saudi Arabia) Ibrahim Al-Barakah	(Saudi Arabia) Al-Mujazzal	Free	
1 October 2018	DF	(Saudi Arabia) Rayan Al-Thiyab	(Saudi Arabia) Al-Helaliah	Free	
1 January 2019	DF	(Saudi Arabia) Jufain Al-Bishi	(Saudi Arabia) Ohod	Free	
1 January 2019	FW	(Saudi Arabia) Ismael Al-Maghrebi	(Saudi Arabia) Ohod	Free	
4 February 2019	MF	(Saudi Arabia) Saeed Al-Dossari	(Saudi Arabia) Al-Hazem	Free	

=== Loans out ===
Date	Pos.	Name	Subsequent club	End date	Source
3 January 2019	MF	(Brazil) Jhonnattann	(Saudi Arabia) Al-Batin	End of season	
5 January 2019	MF	(Saudi Arabia) Mohammed Harzan	(Saudi Arabia) Al-Hazem	End of season	

== Competitions ==
=== Overall ===
Competition	Started round	Current position / round	Final position / round	First match	Last match
Pro League	—	—	3rd	31 August 2018	16 May 2019
King Cup	Round of 64	—	Winners	4 January 2019	2 May 2019

Last Updated: 16 May 2019

=== Pro League ===
==== League table ====
Pos	Team	Pld	W	D	L	GF	GA	GD	Pts	Qualification or relegation
1	Al-Nassr (C)	30	22	4	4	69	27	+42	70	Qualification for AFC Champions League group stage (Note: Al-Taawoun qualified for the AFC Champions League group stage as 2019 King Cup winners.)
2	Al-Hilal	30	21	6	3	66	33	+33	69	Qualification for AFC Champions League group stage
3	Al-Taawoun	30	16	8	6	61	31	+30	56	Qualification for AFC Champions League group stage
4	Al-Ahli	30	17	4	9	68	41	+27	55	Qualification for AFC Champions League play-off round
5	Al-Shabab	30	15	9	6	39	25	+14	54	Qualification for Arab Club Champions Cup

Source: spl.com
Rules for classification: 1) Points; 2) Head-to-head points; 3) Head-to-head goal difference; 4) Total goal difference; 5) Total goals scored; 6) Play-off (only for deciding champion, relegation and AFC competitions participation).
(C) Champions

==== Results summary ====
Overall								Home						Away					
Pld	W	D	L	GF	GA	GD	Pts	W	D	L	GF	GA	GD	W	D	L	GF	GA	GD
30	16	8	6	61	31	+30	56	10	4	1	38	17	+21	6	4	5	23	14	+9

Last updated: 16 May 2019.
Source: Competitive matches

==== Results by round ====
Round	1	2	3	4	5	6	7	8	9	10	11	12	13	14	15	16	17	18	19	20	21	22	23	24	25	26	27	28	29	30
Ground	A	A	H	A	H	A	A	A	A	A	A	A	H	A	H	H	H	H	A	H	H	H	H	H	H	A	H	A	A	H
Result	D	D	W	L	D	W	W	L	L	W	W	W	W	L	D	D	L	W	D	W	W	W	W	D	W	L	W	W	D	W
Position	8	7	7	7	7	6	6	7	7	6	5	4	3	4	4	6	6	5	6	5	4	4	4	4	4	4	4	4	4	3

Updated to match(es) played on 16 May 2019. Source: Competitive matches
A = Away; H = Home; W = Win; D = Draw; L = Loss

==== Matches ====
All times are local, AST (UTC+3).

Win Draw Loss Postponed

1 September 2018 1	Al-Ahli	1–1	Al-Taawoun	Jeddah
19:20	Al-Mowalad (yellow card) 36'; Al-Mogahwi 49'; Souza (yellow card) 50'	Report	Tawamba 24'; Al-Mousa (yellow card) 51'; Al-Olayan (yellow card) 73'; Al-Zubaidi (yellow card) 90+1'	Stadium: King Abdullah Sports City; Attendance: 21,970; Referee: Björn Kuipers (Netherlands)

13 September 2018 2	Al-Hazem	1–1	Al-Taawoun	Buraidah
18:50	Kalfa (yellow card) 34'; Alemão (yellow card) 45'; Rodolfo 59'; Bakheet (yellow card) 88'; Al-Saiari (yellow card) 90+1'	Report	Al-Mousa (yellow card) 36'; Tawamba (yellow card) 45+2', (goal) 69'; Héldon (yellow card) 63'	Stadium: King Abdullah Sport City Stadium; Attendance: 1,155; Referee: Ivan Bebek (Croatia)

20 September 2018 3	Al-Taawoun	5–3	Al-Ittihad	Buraidah
18:45	Al-Hussain 18', 65', (yellow card) 73'; Héldon 43'; Tawamba 75'; Al-Mousa (yellow card) 87'; Al-Absi (yellow card) 90+1'; Adam 90+5'	Report	Al-Muwallad 23', 37'; Assiri (yellow card) 50'; Al-Muziel (yellow card) 71'; Al-Aryani 84'	Stadium: King Abdullah Sport City Stadium; Attendance: 6,246; Referee: Simon Lee Evans (Wales)

24 September 2018 4	Al-Nassr	1–0	Al-Taawoun	Riyadh
20:10	Hamdallah (yellow card) 37', (goal) 75'; Al-Jebreen (yellow card) 85'	Report	Al-Absi (yellow card) 8' (yellow-red card) 48'; Al-Olayan (yellow card) 37'; Machado (yellow card) 81'; Al-Bishi (yellow card) 82'	Stadium: Prince Faisal bin Fahd Stadium; Attendance: 15,631; Referee: Damir Skomina (Slovenia)

5 October 2018 5	Al-Taawoun	1–1	Al-Shabab	Buraidah
18:25	Manoel (yellow card) 37'; Héldon 69'; Al-Zubaidi (yellow card) 71'; Jhonnattann (yellow card) 90+4'	Report	Al-Shamrani 3'; Salem (yellow card) 55'; Găman (yellow card) 90+5'; Al-Shammeri (red card) 90+8'	Stadium: King Abdullah Sport City Stadium; Attendance: 2,700; Referee: Damir Skomina (Slovenia)

19 October 2018 6	Al-Faisaly	1–4	Al-Taawoun	Al Majma'ah
18:10	Rogerinho 19'	Report	Héldon 15', 57'; Tawamba 21'; Cássio (yellow card) 52'; Sufyani 69'	Stadium: King Salman Sport City Stadium; Attendance: 1,132; Referee: Simon Lee Evans (Wales)

26 October 2018 7	Al-Batin	0–5	Al-Taawoun	Hafar al-Batin
18:10	Lucas (red card) 70'; Arango (yellow card) 74'	Report	Amissi 27'; Machado 37', (yellow card) 74'; Héldon (yellow card) 46'; Tawamba 53'; Adam 78'; Sandro Manoel (yellow card) 82'; Ghunaiman 90+3' (o.g.)	Stadium: Al-Batin Club Stadium; Attendance: 4,164; Referee: Fedayi San (Switzerland)

2 November 2018 8	Ohod	1–0	Al-Taawoun	Medina
18:20	Kassar 45'; Laaroubi (yellow card) 72'; Mohammed (yellow card) 77'; Haj Mohamad (yellow card) 84'	Report		Stadium: Prince Mohammed bin Abdul Aziz Stadium; Attendance: 4,360; Referee: Simon Lee Evans (Wales)

24 November 2018 10	Al-Ettifaq	2–4	Al-Taawoun	Khobar
17:30	El Sayed 11'; Al-Kwikbi 17'; Hazazi (yellow card) 37' (yellow-red card) 53'	Report	Tawamba 30', 72' (pen.), (yellow card) 53'; Héldon 49' (pen.); Amissi (yellow card) 52', (goal) 76'	Stadium: Prince Saud bin Jalawi Stadium; Attendance: 1,273; Referee: Tomasz Kwiatkowski (Poland)

1 December 2018 11	Al-Fateh	0–2	Al-Taawoun	Al-Hasa
17:25	Bangoura (yellow card) 75'; Al-Fuhaid (yellow card) 88'	Report	Amissi 22'; Tawamba 68'; Machado (yellow card) 78'	Stadium: Prince Abdullah bin Jalawi Stadium; Attendance: 3,491; Referee: Svein Oddvar Moen (Norway)

7 December 2018 12	Al-Wehda	0–1	Al-Taawoun	Mecca
18:20		Report	Al-Mufarrej (yellow card) 59'; Héldon 76'; Al-Olayan (yellow card) 79'	Stadium: King Abdul Aziz Stadium; Attendance: 3,683; Referee: João Capela (Portugal)

14 December 2018 13	Al-Taawoun	3–0	Al-Fayha	Buraidah
15:15	Tawamba 43', 51', 77' (pen.)	Report	Jaafari (yellow card) 16'	Stadium: King Abdullah Sport City Stadium; Attendance: 2,957; Referee: Svein Oddvar Moen (Norway)

21 December 2018 14	Al-Qadsiah	3–1	Al-Taawoun	Khobar
17:30	Al-Bishi (yellow card) 45'; Al-Khabrani (yellow card) 50'; Al-Zain 54'; Adnan F. (yellow card) 56'; Camara 59', (yellow card) 75'; Bismark 78'	Report	Manoel (yellow card) 34'; Al-Zubaidi (yellow card) 41'; Adam 90+5'	Stadium: Prince Saud bin Jalawi Stadium; Attendance: 1,415; Referee: Anastasios Sidiropoulos (Greece)

25 December 2018 9	Al-Raed	2–1	Al-Taawoun	Buraidah
18:00	Al-Shehri (yellow card) 4', (goal) 62'; Doukha (yellow card) 50'; Al-Showaish 55'	Report	Al-Olayan (yellow card) 8' (yellow-red card) 34'; Tawamba (yellow card) 35'; Al-Absi (yellow card) 48'; Amissi (yellow card) 58'; Jhonnattann 90'	Stadium: King Abdullah Sport City Stadium; Attendance: 8,700; Referee: Sergei Karasev (Russia)

30 December 2018 15	Al-Taawoun	2–2	Al-Hilal	Buraidah
18:00	Héldon 58'; Amissi (yellow card) 60' (yellow-red card) 90+7'; Cássio (yellow card) 82'; Al-Zubaidi (yellow card) 90+7'	Report	Rivas 34', (yellow card) 52'; Carrillo (yellow card) 55'; Kanno (yellow card) 57'; Botía 90+6'	Stadium: King Abdullah Sport City Stadium; Attendance: 14,893; Referee: Danny Makkelie (Netherlands)

10 January 2019 16	Al-Taawoun	1–1	Al-Hazem	Buraidah
18:10	Al-Zubaidi (yellow card) 38'; Adam 90+4'	Report	Al-Qeshtah (yellow card) 3'; Bakheet 90+7'	Stadium: King Abdullah Sport City Stadium; Attendance: 1,473; Referee: Svein Oddvar Moen (Norway)

28 January 2019 17	Al-Taawoun	3–4	Al-Ahli	Buraidah
20:20	Al-Zubaidi 56'; Al-Hussain 59'; Héldon 85'	Report	Asiri 41'; Djaniny 64' (pen.), 86'; Al Somah 80' (pen.); Al-Fatil (yellow card) 90+1'	Stadium: King Abdullah Sport City Stadium; Attendance: 2,724; Referee: Mark Clattenburg (England)

2 February 2019 18	Al-Taawoun	3–1	Al-Nassr	Buraidah
20:15	Petrolina 17'; Amissi (yellow card) 29'; Tawamba 33' (pen.); Héldon 77' (pen.)	Report	Giuliano 40'	Stadium: King Abdullah Sport City Stadium; Attendance: 10,600; Referee: Damir Skomina (Slovenia)

9 February 2019 19	Al-Ittihad	0–0	Al-Taawoun	Jeddah
20:15	Abdulhamid (yellow card) 32'; Al-Sahafi (yellow card) 79'; Al-Muwallad (yellow card) 90+1'	Report	Al-Absi (yellow card) 9'; Al-Zubaidi (yellow card) 40'; Sandro Manoel (yellow card) 66'; Al-Mufarrej (yellow card) 71'; Sufyani (yellow card) 90+2'	Stadium: King Abdullah Sports City; Attendance: 30,785; Referee: Ravshan Irmatov (Uzbekistan)

14 February 2019 20	Al-Taawoun	4–0	Ohod	Buraidah
18:35	Adam 14', 30', 55'; Tawamba 86' (pen.)	Report	Al-Asmari (yellow card) 45+3'; Hamad (yellow card) 90+3'	Stadium: King Abdullah Sport City Stadium; Attendance: 2,474; Referee: Khaled Al-Teris

22 February 2019 21	Al-Taawoun	4–1	Al-Batin	Buraidah
15:55	Adam 19', 50'; Amissi (yellow card) 60'; Al-Absi (yellow card) 64'; Tawamba 70', 76'	Report	Waqes (yellow card) 32'; Jhonnattann (yellow card) 65', (goal) 79'; Nasser (yellow card) 75'; Al-Johani (yellow card) 89'	Stadium: King Abdullah Sport City Stadium; Attendance: 2,694; Referee: Ravshan Irmatov (Uzbekistan)

28 February 2019 22	Al-Taawoun	4–1	Al-Ettifaq	Buraidah
16:00	Adam 6'; Tawamba 37' (pen.), 50', 79', (yellow card) 59'	Report	M'Bolhi (yellow card) 35'; Akaïchi 57'	Stadium: King Abdullah Sport City Stadium; Attendance: 2,557; Referee: Pavel Královec (Czech Republic)

7 March 2019 23	Al-Taawoun	2–1	Al-Raed	Buraidah
20:30	Petrolina (yellow card) 51'; Manoel (yellow card) 64'; Héldon (yellow card) 83'; Sufyani 89', 90+9', (yellow card) 90+11'	Report	Belkaroui (yellow card) 27'; Al-Fahad (yellow card) 42' (yellow-red card) 79'; Mboyo (yellow card) 52'; Al-Shehri 53' (pen.); Hammoudan (yellow card) 88'	Stadium: King Abdullah Sport City Stadium; Attendance: 9,164; Referee: Sergei Karasev (Russia)

14 March 2019 24	Al-Taawoun	1–1	Al-Fateh	Buraidah
20:15	Amissi (yellow card) 36'; Tawamba 46', (yellow card) 73'; Adam (yellow card) 73'	Report	Al-Hassan (yellow card) 27'; Pedro 31'; Al-Dossari (yellow card) 52'; Naâmani (yellow card) 57'	Stadium: King Abdullah Sport City Stadium; Attendance: 2,465; Referee: Ravshan Irmatov (Uzbekistan)

28 March 2019 25	Al-Taawoun	1–0	Al-Wehda	Buraidah
19:00	Renato Chaves 90+6' (o.g.)	Report	Al-Amri (yellow card) 24'; Al-Qarni (yellow card) 80'; Al-Nemer (yellow card) 90+5'	Stadium: King Abdullah Sport City Stadium; Attendance: 2,188; Referee: Szymon Marciniak (Poland)

6 April 2019 26	Al-Fayha	2–1	Al-Taawoun	Al Majma'ah
18:55	Asprilla 37', 80'; Al-Muziel (yellow card) 82'; Shafi (yellow card) 90+8'	Report	Adam 45+1', (yellow card) 45+3'; Tawamba (yellow card) 63'; Al-Zubaidi (yellow card) 72'	Stadium: King Salman Sport City Stadium; Attendance: 1,617; Referee: Damir Skomina (Slovenia)

12 April 2019 27	Al-Taawoun	2–0	Al-Qadsiah	Buraidah
19:05	Petrolina 14'; Sufyani 52'; Adam (yellow card) 90'	Report	Al-Shoeil (yellow card) 28'; Jorginho (yellow card) 34'; Abdulmohsen. F (yellow card) 45'	Stadium: King Abdullah Sport City Stadium; Attendance: 2,022; Referee: Miroslav Zelinka (Czech Republic)

29 April 2019 28	Al-Hilal	0–2	Al-Taawoun	Riyadh
19:00	Al-Breik (yellow card) 51'	Report	Sufyani (yellow card) 43'; Al-Mousa (yellow card) 45+1'; Tawamba 65'; Héldon 69', (yellow card) 90+1'; Machado (yellow card) 81'	Stadium: King Saud University Stadium; Attendance: 22,335; Referee: Artur Soares Dias (Portugal)

11 May 2019 29	Al-Shabab	0–0	Al-Taawoun	Riyadh
22:30	Boussoufa (yellow card) 78'	Report	Al-Mousa (yellow card) 11'; Tawamba (yellow card) 67'; Manoel (yellow card) 81'; Cássio (yellow card) 90+4'	Stadium: Prince Faisal bin Fahd Stadium; Attendance: 1,474; Referee: Pavel Královec (Czech Republic)

16 May 2019 30	Al-Taawoun	2–1	Al-Faisaly	Buraidah
22:30	Al-Hussain 35'; Tawamba 39'; Al-Mufarrij (yellow card) 53'; Amissi (yellow card) 69'; Petrolina (yellow card) 89'	Report	Calderón 25'; Luisinho (yellow card) 45+6'; Puljić (yellow card) 64'; Al-Sowayed (yellow card) 86'	Stadium: King Abdullah Sport City Stadium; Attendance: 1,500; Referee: Anastasios Sidiropoulos (Greece)

=== King Cup ===
All times are local, AST (UTC+3).

4 January 2019 Round of 64	Al-Taawoun	1–0	Al-Adalah	Buraidah
18:05	Tawamba 69'; Al-Olayan (yellow card) 90+2'	Report	Andria (yellow card) 55'; Boufalgha (yellow card) 78'	Stadium: King Abdullah Sport City Stadium; Referee: Abdullah Al-Shehri

18 January 2019 Round of 32	Al-Taawoun	6–0	Al-Shabab	Buraidah
15:35	Petrolina 19'; Tawamba 33', 70'; Adam 40'; Sandro Manoel 45+2' (pen.); Héldon 82'	Report	Coulibaly (yellow card) 50'	Stadium: King Abdullah Sport City Stadium; Referee: Khaled Salwi

23 January 2019 Round of 16	Al-Taawoun	3–0	Al-Shabab	Buraidah
18:20	Sufyani 10'; Héldon 41' (pen.); Al-Zubaidi 45'; Amissi (yellow card) 55'	Report	Boussoufa (yellow card) 37'; Ben Mustapha (yellow card) 45'; Luiz Antônio (yellow card) 48'; Ghazi (yellow card) 56'	Stadium: King Abdullah Sport City Stadium; Referee: Ovidiu Hațegan (Romania)

2 April 2019 Quarter-finals	Al-Taawoun	3–0	Al-Wehda	Buraidah
19:00	Al-Mousa (yellow card) 45+2'; Tawamba 58'; Sandro Manoel 60'; Adam 64'	Report	Renato Chaves (yellow card) 44'; Bakshween (yellow card) 66'; Otero (yellow card) 89'	Stadium: King Abdullah Sport City Stadium; Referee: Bakary Gassama (Gambia)

26 April 2019 Semi-finals	Al-Hilal	0–5	Al-Taawoun	Riyadh
19:00		Report	Al-Zubaidi (yellow card) 10', (goal) 86'; Sandro Manoel 19'; Adam 22'; Amissi 56'; Tawamba 81'	Stadium: King Saud University Stadium; Referee: Danny Makkelie (Netherlands)

2 May 2019 Final	Al-Ittihad	1–2	Al-Taawoun	Riyadh
20:45	Prijović 32'; El Ahmadi (yellow card) 71'	Report	Al-Absi 55'; Al-Mousa (yellow card) 60'; Petrolina (yellow card) 61'; Sandro Manoel (yellow card) 76'; Tawamba 90'	Stadium: King Fahd International Stadium; Attendance: 58,223; Referee: Néstor Pitana (Argentina)

== Statistics ==
=== Squad statistics ===
Last updated on 16 May 2019.

No.	Pos	Nat	Player	Total		Pro League		King Cup	
No.	Pos	Nat	Player	Apps	Goals	Apps	Goals	Apps	Goals
Goalkeepers
1	GK	(Brazil)	Cássio	33	0	29	0	4	0
21	GK	(Saudi Arabia)	Moataz Al-Baqaawi	0	0	0	0	0	0
23	GK	(Saudi Arabia)	Hussain Shae'an	3	0	1	0	2	0
Defenders
4	DF	(Portugal)	Ricardo Machado	27	1	19+4	1	2+2	0
5	DF	(Saudi Arabia)	Talal Al-Absi	31	1	26	0	5	1
13	DF	(Saudi Arabia)	Ibrahim Al-Zubaidi	32	3	26+1	1	5	2
16	DF	(Saudi Arabia)	Naif Al-Mousa	8	0	4+3	0	1	0
18	DF	(Saudi Arabia)	Madallah Al-Olayan	30	0	25+1	0	4	0
32	DF	(Saudi Arabia)	Muteb Al-Mufarrij	24	0	16+2	0	6	0
47	DF	(Saudi Arabia)	Mohammed Bassas	0	0	0	0	0	0
88	DF	(Saudi Arabia)	Hamdan Al-Ruwaili	11	0	5+4	0	1+1	0
Midfielders
6	MF	(Saudi Arabia)	Ryan Al-Mousa	17	0	5+9	0	3	0
7	MF	(Saudi Arabia)	Rabee Sufyani	30	5	17+8	4	3+2	1
8	MF	(Brazil)	Nildo Petrolina	19	3	12+2	2	3+2	1
10	MF	(Syria)	Jehad Al-Hussain	33	4	21+7	4	2+3	0
11	MF	(Saudi Arabia)	Nasser Al-Daajani	3	0	0+3	0	0	0
17	MF	(Burundi)	Cédric Amissi	33	4	25+2	3	6	1
19	MF	(Saudi Arabia)	Ibrahim Al-Otaybi	3	0	0+1	0	0+2	0
20	MF	(Cape Verde)	Héldon Ramos	32	12	25+2	10	3+2	2
29	MF	(Saudi Arabia)	Abdullah Al-Jouei	1	0	0+1	0	0	0
35	MF	(Saudi Arabia)	Yahya Khormi	0	0	0	0	0	0
44	MF	(Saudi Arabia)	Saleh Al-Saeed	0	0	0	0	0	0
55	MF	(Brazil)	Sandro Manoel	32	3	26	0	6	3
80	MF	(Saudi Arabia)	Abdulmajeed Al-Sawat	5	0	1+4	0	0	0
Forwards
3	FW	(Cameroon)	Léandre Tawamba	34	27	28	21	5+1	6
9	FW	(Saudi Arabia)	Abdulfattah Adam	30	15	10+15	12	4+1	3
25	FW	(Saudi Arabia)	Mansour Al-Muwallad	2	0	0+1	0	0+1	0
Players sent out on loan this season
12	MF	(Brazil)	Jhonnattann	9	1	2+7	1	0	0
77	MF	(Saudi Arabia)	Mohammed Harzan	0	0	0	0	0	0
Player who made an appearance this season but have left the club
27	MF	(Saudi Arabia)	Saeed Al-Dossari	15	0	5+8	0	1+1	0
28	DF	(Saudi Arabia)	Jufain Al-Bishi	3	0	2+1	0	0	0
70	FW	(Saudi Arabia)	Ismael Al-Maghrebi	1	0	0+1	0	0	0

=== Goalscorers ===
Rank	No.	Pos	Nat	Name	Pro League	King Cup	Total
1	3	FW	(Cameroon)	Léandre Tawamba	21	6	27
2	9	FW	(Saudi Arabia)	Abdulfattah Adam	12	3	15
3	20	MF	(Cape Verde)	Héldon Ramos	10	2	12
4	7	MF	(Saudi Arabia)	Rabee Sufyani	4	1	5
5	10	MF	(Syria)	Jehad Al-Hussain	4	0	4
5	17	MF	(Burundi)	Cédric Amissi	3	1	4
7	8	MF	(Brazil)	Nildo Petrolina	2	1	3
7	13	DF	(Saudi Arabia)	Ibrahim Al-Zubaidi	1	2	3
7	55	MF	(Brazil)	Sandro Manoel	0	3	3
10	4	DF	(Portugal)	Ricardo Machado	1	0	1
10	5	DF	(Saudi Arabia)	Talal Al-Absi	0	1	1
10	12	MF	(Brazil)	Jhonnattann	1	0	1
Own goal					2	0	2
Total					61	20	81

Last Updated: 16 May 2019

=== Assists ===
Rank	No.	Pos	Nat	Name	Pro League	King Cup	Total
1	20	MF	(Cape Verde)	Héldon Ramos	6	6	12
2	10	MF	(Syria)	Jehad Al-Hussain	5	2	7
3	13	DF	(Saudi Arabia)	Ibrahim Al-Zubaidi	4	2	6
4	3	FW	(Cameroon)	Léandre Tawamba	5	0	5
4	7	MF	(Saudi Arabia)	Rabee Sufyani	5	0	5
6	8	MF	(Brazil)	Nildo Petrolina	3	1	4
6	9	FW	(Saudi Arabia)	Abdulfattah Adam	1	3	4
8	17	MF	(Burundi)	Cédric Amissi	3	0	3
9	27	MF	(Saudi Arabia)	Saeed Al-Dossari	2	0	2
9	55	MF	(Brazil)	Sandro Manoel	2	0	2
11	1	GK	(Brazil)	Cássio	1	0	1
11	6	MF	(Saudi Arabia)	Ryan Al-Mousa	1	0	1
11	12	MF	(Brazil)	Jhonnattann	1	0	1
11	16	DF	(Saudi Arabia)	Naif Al-Mousa	1	0	1
11	18	DF	(Saudi Arabia)	Madallah Al-Olayan	0	1	1
11	88	DF	(Saudi Arabia)	Hamdan Al-Ruwaili	1	0	1
Total					41	15	56

Last Updated: 16 May 2019

=== Clean sheets ===
Rank	No.	Pos	Nat	Name	Pro League	King Cup	Total
1	1	GK	(Brazil)	Cássio	10	3	13
2	23	GK	(Saudi Arabia)	Hussain Shae'an	0	2	2
Total					10	5	15

Last Updated: 11 May 2019
