= 2019 Saudi Super Cup =

2019 Saudi Super Cup كأس السوبر السعودي 2019
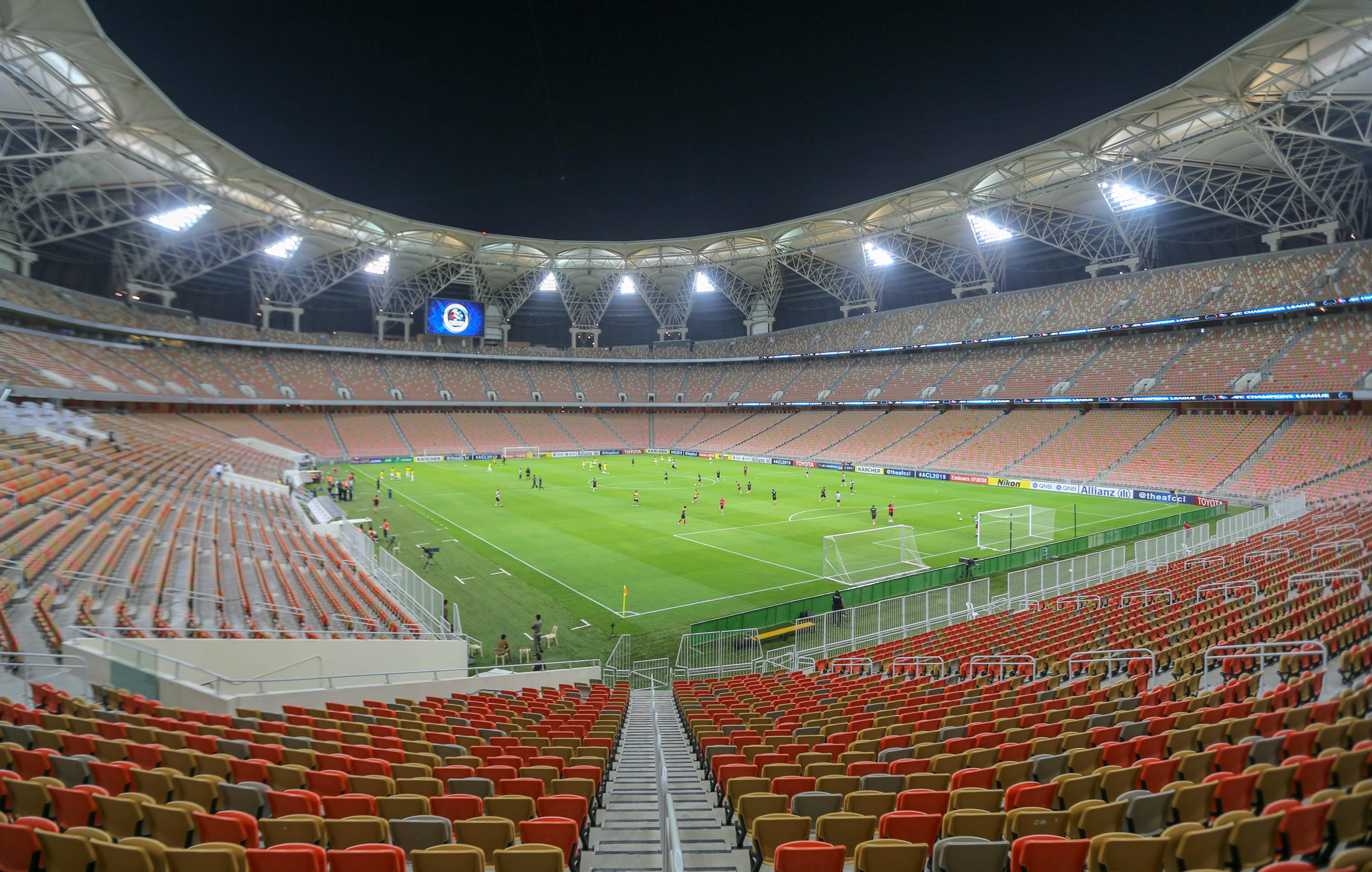
- King Abdullah Stadium in Jeddah hosted the match
Al-Nassr	Al-Taawoun
Pro League	King Cup
1	1
- After extra time Al-Nassr won 5–4 on penalties
- Date: 4 January 2020
- Venue: King Abdullah Stadium, Jeddah, Saudi Arabia
- Referee: Danny Makkelie (Netherlands)
- Attendance: 40,514
- Weather: Cloudy; 22 °C (72 °F); 54% humidity

The 2019 Saudi Super Cup was the sixth edition of the Saudi Super Cup, an annual football match contested by the winners of the previous season's Saudi Pro League and King Cup competitions.

The match was played on 4 January 2020 between Al-Nassr, the winners of the 2018–19 Saudi Pro League, and Al-Taawoun, the winners of the 2019 King Cup.

It was the first edition of the Saudi Super Cup to be held at the King Abdullah Stadium in Jeddah, Saudi Arabia.

Al-Nassr won 5–4 on penalties after a 1–1 draw at the end of extra time, claiming their first Saudi Super Cup title.

== Venue ==
The King Abdullah Stadium, also known as the Jewel Stadium, was announced as the venue of the final on 11 November 2019. This was the first time the King Abdullah Sports City hosted the final and was the third time it was hosted in Saudi Arabia.

== Background ==
This will be Al-Nassr's third appearance in the Saudi Super Cup and their first in four years. They previously finished as runners-up in the 2014 and 2015 editions. In contrast, this will be Al-Taawoun's first appearance in the competition.

Both clubs will be aiming to win the Saudi Super Cup for the first time. Al-Nassr failed to win in their two previous appearances, while Al-Taawoun will be making their debut and become the seventh team to participate in the competition.

Al-Nassr qualified by winning the 2018–19 Saudi Pro League on the final matchday, defeating Al-Batin 2–1. Al-Taawoun qualified by winning their first King's Cup title, defeating defending champions Al-Ittihad 2–1 in the final.

The two teams met twice in the 2018–19 season, with each team winning one match.

The match was originally scheduled to take place in Abu Dhabi on 24 January 2020. However, on 11 November 2019, the Saudi Football Federation announced the match would be held on 4 January 2020 in Jeddah to accommodate the Spanish Super Cup, which was taking place in the same week and venue.

== Match ==
=== Details ===
4 January 2020
20:15 SAST

Al-Nassr	1–1	Al-Taawoun
Hamdallah 58'	Report	Tawamba 18'
Penalties
Hamdallah (penalty scored); Giuliano (penalty scored); Amrabat (penalty missed); Al-Shehri (penalty scored); Adam (penalty scored); Maicon (penalty scored)	5–4	(penalty scored) Sandro Manoel; (penalty scored) Petrolina; (penalty scored) Amissi; (penalty missed) Machado; (penalty scored) Héldon; (penalty missed) Al-Absi

King Abdullah Stadium, Jeddah
Attendance: 40,514
Referee: Danny Makkelie (Netherlands)

Al-Nassr	Al-Taawoun

GK	1	(Australia) Brad Jones
RB	2	(Saudi Arabia) Sultan Al-Ghanam
CB	3	(Saudi Arabia) Abdullah Madu		(substituted off) 73'
CB	18	(Brazil) Maicon
LB	27	(Saudi Arabia) Awadh Khamis
DM	6	(Brazil) Petros
DM	17	(Saudi Arabia) Abdullah Al-Khaibari	(yellow card) 54'	(substituted off) 90+4'
RW	11	(Morocco) Nordin Amrabat
AM	10	(Brazil) Giuliano (c)
LW	7	(Nigeria) Ahmed Musa		(substituted off) 85'
CF	9	(Morocco) Abderrazak Hamdallah
Substitutes:
GK	31	(Saudi Arabia) Zaid Al-Bawardi
DF	20	(Saudi Arabia) Hamad Al Mansor
DF	37	(Saudi Arabia) Naif Almas
MF	8	(Saudi Arabia) Yahya Al-Shehri		(substituted on) 90+4'
MF	16	(Saudi Arabia) Abdulaziz Al-Jebreen
MF	38	(Saudi Arabia) Fahad Al-Jumeiah		(substituted on) 73'
MF	39	(Saudi Arabia) Abdurahman Al-Dossari
MF	46	(Saudi Arabia) Khalid Al-Ghwinem
FW	29	(Saudi Arabia) Abdulfattah Adam		(substituted on) 85'
Manager:
(Portugal) Rui Vitória

GK	1	(Brazil) Cássio
RB	18	(Saudi Arabia) Madallah Al-Olayan	(yellow card) 90+7'
CB	4	(Portugal) Ricardo Machado	(yellow card) 90+2'
CB	5	(Saudi Arabia) Talal Al-Absi (c)	(yellow card) 40'
LB	8	(Brazil) Nildo Petrolina	(yellow card) 35'
DM	6	(Saudi Arabia) Ryan Al-Mousa	(yellow card) 54'
DM	55	(Brazil) Sandro Manoel	(yellow card) 65'
RW	15	(Saudi Arabia) Fahad Al-Rashidi		(substituted off) 64'
AM	17	(Burundi) Cédric Amissi	(yellow card) 68'
LW	20	(Cape Verde) Héldon
CF	3	(Cameroon) Léandre Tawamba		(substituted off) 32'
Substitutes:
GK	23	(Saudi Arabia) Hussain Shae'an
DF	2	(Saudi Arabia) Yassin Barnawi
DF	16	(Saudi Arabia) Fahad Al-Hamad
DF	33	(Saudi Arabia) Ahmed Assiri		(substituted on) 64'
MF	7	(Saudi Arabia) Rabee Sufyani		(substituted on) 46'
MF	11	(Saudi Arabia) Nasser Al-Daajani
MF	77	(Saudi Arabia) Mohammed Harzan
MF	80	(Saudi Arabia) Abdulmajeed Al-Swat
FW	9	(Saudi Arabia) Mansour Al-Muwallad		(substituted on) 32'	(substituted off) 46'
Manager:
(Saudi Arabia) Abdullah Asiri

Assistant referees:
Mario Diks (Netherlands)
Hessel Steegstra (Netherlands)
Fourth official:
Christian Bax (Netherlands)
Video assistant referee:
Joachim Kamphius (Netherlands)
Assistant video assistant referees:
Rob Dieperink (Netherlands)

Match rules

- 90 minutes.
- Penalty shoot-out if scores still level.
- Nine named substitutes, of which up to three may be used.

=== Statistics ===
First half
Statistic	Al-Nassr	Al-Taawoun
Goals scored	0	1
Total shots	7	2
Shots on target	4	1
Saves	0	4
Ball possession	58%	42%
Corner kicks	2	4
Fouls committed	6	13
Offsides	3	2
Yellow cards	0	2
Red cards	0	0

Second half
Statistic	Al-Nassr	Al-Taawoun
Goals scored	1	0
Total shots	16	4
Shots on target	4	0
Saves	0	3
Ball possession	61%	39%
Corner kicks	4	0
Fouls committed	9	13
Offsides	1	1
Yellow cards	1	5
Red cards	0	0

Overall
Statistic	Al-Nassr	Al-Taawoun
Goals scored	1	1
Total shots	23	6
Shots on target	8	1
Saves	0	7
Ball possession	60%	40%
Corner kicks	6	4
Fouls committed	15	26
Offsides	4	3
Yellow cards	1	7
Red cards	0	0

== See also ==
- 2018–19 Saudi Pro League
- 2019 King Cup final
- 2019 King Cup
