= Ibrahim Al-Otaybi =

Saudi Arabian footballer

Ibrahim Al-Otaybi إبراهيم العتيبي
Personal information
- Full name: Ibrahim Al-Otaybi
- Date of birth: 15 January 1997 (age 29)
- Place of birth: Saudi Arabia
- Height: 1.69 m (5 ft 7 in)
- Position: Midfielder

Youth career
- –2018: Al-Taawoun

Senior career*
Years	Team	Apps	(Gls)
2018–2022	Al-Taawoun	2	(0)
2021	→ Al-Diriyah (loan)	-	(-)
2022–2023	Al-Ula		
- * Club domestic league appearances and goals

Ibrahim Al-Otaybi (Arabic: إبراهيم العتيبي, born 15 January 1997) is a Saudi Arabian professional footballer who plays as a midfielder.

== Career ==
Al-Otaybi he joined Al-Taawoun's youth team . On 16 May 2019, Al-Otaybi made his professional debut for Al-Taawoun against Al-Faisaly in the Pro League, replacing Rabee Sufyani . he renewed his contract with Al-Taawoun on 7 October 2019

== Career statistics ==
=== Club ===
As of match played 13 July 2020

Club	Season	League		King Cup		Asia		Other		Total	
Club	Season	Apps	Goals	Apps	Goals	Apps	Goals	Apps	Goals	Apps	Goals
Al-Taawoun	2018–19	1	0	0	0	—			—	1	0
Al-Taawoun	2019–20	0	0	0	0	—			—	0	0
Al-Taawoun	Total	1	0	0	0	0	0	0	0	1	0
Career totals		1	0	0	0	0	0	0	0	1	0

== Honours ==
=== Club ===
Al-Taawoun

- King Cup: 2019
