= Hamdan Al-Ruwaili =

Saudi Arabian footballer

Hamdan Al-Ruwaili حمدان الرويلي
Personal information
- Full name: Hamdan Ashwi Al-Ruwaili
- Date of birth: 14 March 1995 (age 31)
- Place of birth: Al Jawf, Saudi Arabia
- Height: 1.71 m (5 ft 7 1/2 in)
- Position: Right-back

Team information
- Current team: Al-Entelaq
- Number: 18

Youth career
- –2013: Al-Entelaq
- 2013–2015: Al-Orobah

Senior career*
Years	Team	Apps	(Gls)
2015–2018	Al-Orobah	45	(2)
2018–2021	Al-Taawoun	14	(0)
2022–2024	Al-Orobah	15	(0)
2025–	Al-Entelaq		(0)
- * Club domestic league appearances and goals as of 21 January 2022

Hamdan Al-Ruwaili (Arabic: حمدان الرويلي, born 14 March 1995) is a Saudi Arabian professional footballer who plays for Al-Entelaq as a right-back.

== Career ==
Al-Ruwaili began his career in the youth setups of Al-Entelaq. He then joined Al-Orobah in 2013. He made his first-team debut during the 2015–16 season. He spent 3 seasons at the club and made 53 appearances and scored twice. On 3 July 2018, Al-Ruwaili joined Pro League side Al-Taawoun on a 2-year contract. He made his debut 25 December 2018 in the league match against city rivals Al-Raed. On 29 April 2019 during the league match against Al-Hilal, Al-Ruwaili was injured and stretchered off the pitch. On 7 May 2019, Al-Taawoun announced that Al-Ruwaili suffered from a torn ACL. On 9 January 2020, Al-Ruwaili extended his contract with Al-Taawoun until 2023. He was released by Al-Taawoun on 21 December 2021. On 21 January 2022, Al-Ruwaili rejoined Al-Orobah.

== Career statistics ==
=== Club ===
As of match played 28 May 2024

Appearances and goals by club, season and competition
Club	Season	League			King Cup		Asia		Other		Total	
Club	Season	Division	Apps	Goals	Apps	Goals	Apps	Goals	Apps	Goals	Apps	Goals
Al-Orobah	2014–15	Pro League	0	0	1	0	—		1 (Note: Appearances in Crown Prince Cup)	0	2	0
Al-Orobah	2015–16	First Division	5	0	2	0	—		1	0	8	0
Al-Orobah	2016–17	First Division	22	1	1	0	—		0	0	23	1
Al-Orobah	2017–18	MS League	18	1	2	0	—		—		20	1
Al-Orobah	Total		45	2	6	0	0	0	2	0	53	2
Al-Taawoun	2018–19	Pro League	9	0	2	0	—		—		11	0
Al-Taawoun	2019–20	Pro League	5	0	0	0	1	0	—		6	0
Al-Taawoun	2020–21	Pro League	0	0	0	0	—		—		0	0
Al-Taawoun	2021–22	Pro League	0	0	0	0	0	0	—		0	0
Al-Taawoun	Total		14	0	2	0	1	0	0	0	17	0
Al-Orobah	2021–22	First Division	0	0	—		—		—		0	0
Al-Orobah	2022–23	First Division	2	0	—		—		—		2	0
Al-Orobah	2023–24	First Division	13	0	1	0	—		—		14	0
Al-Orobah	Total		15	0	1	0	0	0	0	0	16	0
Career total			74	2	9	0	1	0	2	0	86	2

== Honours ==
Al-Taawoun

- King Cup: 2019

Al-Orobah

- First Division League runner-up: 2023–24
