= Moataz Al-Baqaawi =

Saudi Arabian footballer

Personal information
- Full name: Moataz Abdulrahman Al-Baqaawi
- Date of birth: January 4, 1998 (age 28)
- Place of birth: Baqaa, Saudi Arabia
- Height: 1.80 m (5 ft 11 in)
- Position: Goalkeeper

Team information
- Current team: Damac
- Number: 33

Youth career
- –2013: Al-Lewaa
- 2013–2018: Al-Taawoun

Senior career*
Years	Team	Apps	(Gls)
2018–2022	Al-Taawoun	1	(0)
2022–2025	Al-Tai	46	(0)
2025–	Damac	0	(0)

International career
2015–2017	Saudi Arabia U20		
2017–2018	Saudi Arabia U23		
- * Club domestic league appearances and goals as of 27 May 2024

Moataz Al-Baqaawi (Arabic: معتز البقعاوي; born 4 January 1998) is a Saudi Arabian professional footballer who plays as a goalkeeper for Pro League side Damac.

== Club career ==
Al-Baqaawi started his career at hometown club Al-Lewaa before joining Al-Taawoun on 21 November 2013. He signed his first professional contract with the club on 11 June 2017. He was promoted to the first team during the 2018–19 season. Al-Baqaawi finally made his debut on 21 November 2021 in the 3–0 defeat to Al-Batin. On 13 July 2022, Al-Baqaawi joined Al-Tai on a free transfer.

On 26 August 2025, Al-Baqaawi joined Damac.

== Career statistics ==
=== Club ===
As of match played 27 May 2025

Club	Season	League			King Cup		Asia		Other		Total	
Club	Season	Division	Apps	Goals	Apps	Goals	Apps	Goals	Apps	Goals	Apps	Goals
Al-Taawoun	2018–19	Pro League	0	0	0	0	—		—		0	0
Al-Taawoun	2019–20	Pro League	0	0	0	0	0	0	0	0	0	0
Al-Taawoun	2020–21	Pro League	0	0	0	0	—		—		0	0
Al-Taawoun	2021–22	Pro League	1	0	0	0	6	0	—		7	0
Al-Taawoun	Total		1	0	0	0	6	0	0	0	7	0
Al-Tai	2022–23	Pro League	0	0	0	0	—		—		0	0
Al-Tai	2023–24	Pro League	14	0	0	0	—		—		14	0
Al-Tai	2024–25	FDL	32	0	2	0	—		1	0	35	0
Al-Tai	Total		46	0	2	0	0	0	1	0	49	0
Damac	2025–26	Pro League	0	0	0	0	—		—		0	0
Career totals			47	0	2	0	6	0	1	0	56	0
