= Abdullah Al-Jouei =

Saudi Arabian footballer (born 1995)

Personal information
- Full name: Abdullah Ahmed Al-Jouei
- Date of birth: 2 March 1995 (age 31)
- Place of birth: Riyadh, Saudi Arabia
- Height: 1.67 m (5 ft 6 in)
- Positions: Winger; right midfielder

Youth career
- Al-Hilal

Senior career*
Years	Team	Apps	(Gls)
2017–2018	Al-Batin	31	(0)
2018–2019	Marítimo	0	(0)
2019–2021	Al-Taawoun	28	(3)
2020	→ Damac (loan)	14	(2)
2021–2024	Al-Shabab	24	(0)
2022–2023	→ Al-Tai (loan)	11	(0)
2025–2026	Al-Fayha	5	(0)

International career^{‡}
2017–2018	Saudi Arabia U23		
2017–	Saudi Arabia	1	(1)
- * Club domestic league appearances and goals as of 2 September 2023 (UTC) ‡ National team caps and goals as of 7 October 2017 (UTC)

Abdullah Ahmed Al-Jouei (Arabic: عَبْد الله أَحْمَد الْجَوْعِيّ; born 2 March 1995) is a Saudi Arabian professional footballer who plays as a winger.

== Club career ==
=== Al-Batin ===
Al-Jouei started his career with Al-Hilal youth team then moved to Al-Batin in January 2017. Al-Jouei signed a six-month contract with the club. He made his debut on 27 January 2017 in the league match against Al-Khaleej. He ended his first at the league with 10 appearances and 0 goals. Al-Jouei renewed his contract for a further year on 23 May 2017. In his second season with Al-Batin, Al-Jouei made 25 appearances across all competitions and scored 0 goals.

=== Marítimo ===
On 17 March 2018, Al-Jouei signed a four-year professional contract with Portuguese side C.S. Marítimo. He officially joined the club on 26 June 2018 following the expiry of his contract with Al-Batin. On 31 October 2018, Al-Jouei was in the matchday squad for the first time in the Taça da Liga match against Feirense. He was an unused substitute as Marítimo lost 3–2. Al-Jouei was not included in any further matchday squads and made only one appearance for the B team.

=== Al-Taawoun ===
After making no appearances for the Marítimo first team, Al-Jouei left Portugal and returned to Saudi Arabia on 3 February 2019. He signed a three-year contract with Al-Taawoun. He made his debut on 14 March 2019 by coming off the bench in the league match against Al-Fateh. That would be his only appearance for Al-Taawoun before being sent on loan to Damac on 21 January 2020.

=== Al-Fayha ===
After a year without a club, Al-Jouei joined Al-Fayha on 11 August 2025.

== International career ==
On 9 October 2017, Al-Jouei made his senior international debut in a friendly match. Saudi Arabia beat Jamaica 5–2. He came off the bench and scored the 5th goal.

== Career statistics ==
Scores and results list Jamaica's goal tally first.

No	Date	Venue	Opponent	Score	Result	Competition
1.	7 October 2017	King Abdullah Sports City, Jeddah, Jamaica	Jamaica	5–2	5–2	Friendly

== Honours ==
Al-Taawoun

- King Cup: 2019
