= Fahad Al-Hamad =

Saudi Arabian association football player

Personal information
- Full name: Fahad Rasheed Al-Hamad
- Date of birth: July 1, 1998 (age 28)
- Place of birth: Riyadh, Saudi Arabia
- Height: 1.88 m (6 ft 2 in)
- Position: Defender

Team information
- Current team: Al-Tai
- Number: 26

Youth career
- –2019: Al-Nassr

Senior career*
Years	Team	Apps	(Gls)
2019	Ceares	0	(0)
2019–2021	Al-Taawoun	10	(0)
2021–2025	Al-Ahli	34	(0)
2025–	Al-Tai	0	(0)

International career
2019–2021	Saudi Arabia U23		
- * Club domestic league appearances and goals as of 25 October 2024

Fahad Al-Hamad (Arabic: فهد الحمد; born July 1, 1998) is a Saudi Arabian professional footballer who currently plays as a defender for Al-Tai.

== Career ==
Al-Hamad started his career at the youth team of Al-Nassr. He left Al-Nassr in June 2019 and joined Spanish club UC Ceares, but few weeks later he left Spain due to bureaucratic problems.

On 16 September 2019, Al-Hamad joined Saudi Professional League side Al-Taawoun. On 27 August 2021, Al-Hamad signed a four-year contract with Al-Ahli.

On 31 January 2025, Al-Hamad joined Al-Tai.

== Career statistics ==
=== Club ===
As of match played 31 January 2025

Club	Season	League		King Cup		Asia		Other		Total	
Club	Season	Apps	Goals	Apps	Goals	Apps	Goals	Apps	Goals	Apps	Goals
Al-Taawoun	2019–20	5	0	1	0	5	0	—		11	0
Al-Taawoun	2020–21	5	0	0	0	—		—		5	0
Al-Taawoun	Total	10	0	1	0	5	0	0	0	16	0
Al-Ahli	2021–22	7	0	0	0	—		—		7	0
Al-Ahli	2022–23	20	0	—		—		—		20	0
Al-Ahli	2023–24	4	0	0	0	—		—		4	0
Al-Ahli	2024–25	3	0	0	0	1	0	1	0	5	0
Al-Ahli	Total	34	0	0	0	1	0	1	0	36	0
Career totals		44	0	1	0	6	0	1	0	52	0
