= Yahya Kharmi =

Saudi Arabian footballer

Personal information
- Full name: Yahya Mohammed Kharmi
- Date of birth: June 8, 1998 (age 28)
- Place of birth: Jazan, Saudi Arabia
- Positions: Left-back; winger

Youth career
- Al-Ittihad

Senior career*
Years	Team	Apps	(Gls)
2016–2018	Al-Ittihad	3	(0)
2018–2020	Al-Taawoun	0	(0)
2021	Al-Kholood		
2021–2022	Bisha	18	(0)
2022–2025	Wej		
2025–2026	Al-Zulfi	32	(1)
- * Club domestic league appearances and goals

Yahya Kharmi (Arabic: يحيى خرمي) (born 8 June 1998) is a Saudi Arabian footballer who plays as a left-back or winger.

== Career ==
On 1 August 2025, Kharmi joined Al-Zulfi.
