= Mansour Al-Muwallad =

Saudi Arabian footballer

Mansour Al-Muwallad منصور المولد
Personal information
- Full name: Mansour Saeed Al-Muwallad
- Date of birth: 24 January 1997 (age 29)
- Place of birth: Saudi Arabia
- Height: 1.82 m (5 ft 11 1/2 in)
- Position: Forward

Youth career
- 2012–2018: Al-Ahli

Senior career*
Years	Team	Apps	(Gls)
2018–2019	Al-Ahli	0	(0)
2019–2020	Al-Taawoun	8	(1)
2020	→ Damac (loan)	0	(0)
2020–2021	Damac	2	(0)
2021	→ Al-Adalah (loan)	10	(0)
2021–2022	Al-Shoulla	17	(1)
2022	Al-Kholood	7	(0)
2022–2024	Jeddah	19	(0)

International career^{‡}
2016–2017	Saudi Arabia U20		
2018–2020	Saudi Arabia U23		
- * Club domestic league appearances and goals as of 5 October 2019 ‡ National team caps and goals as of 5 October 2019

Mansour Al-Muwallad (Arabic: منصور المولد; born 24 January 1997) is a Saudi Arabian professional footballer who plays as a forward.

== Honours ==
Al-Taawoun

- King Cup: 2019
