= Ibrahim Al-Zubaidi =

Saudi Arabian footballer

Personal information
- Full name: Ibrahim Salem Ali Al-Zubaidi
- Date of birth: October 4, 1989 (age 37)
- Place of birth: Mecca, Saudi Arabia
- Height: 1.80 m (5 ft 11 in)
- Position: Left back

Youth career
- 2005–2009: Al-Wehda

Senior career*
Years	Team	Apps	(Gls)
2009–2012	Al-Wehda	35	(6)
2013–2016	Al-Nassr	6	(0)
2016	Najran	8	(0)
2016–2021	Al-Taawoun	78	(1)
2021–2022	Al-Tai	20	(0)
2022–2024	Al-Ahli	27	(0)
2024	→ Abha (loan)	14	(0)
2024–2025	Al-Orobah	24	(0)
Total		212	(7)
- * Club domestic league appearances and goals as of 27 May 2024

Ibrahim Al-Zubaidi (Arabic: ابراهيم الزبيدي) is a former Saudi Arabian professional footballer who played as a left back.

== Career ==
Al-Zubaidi started his career at Al-Wehda and played in the club's youth team. He made his debut for the first team during the 2009–10 season. On 17 June 2012, he signed a pre-contract agreement with Al-Nassr. He officially joined Al-Nassr in January 2013. On 7 January 2016, Al-Zubaidi left Al-Nassr and joined Najran. Following Najran's relegation to the First Division at the end of the 2015–16 season, Al-Zubaidi left the club and signed a 3-year contract with Al-Taawoun. On 19 December 2018, Al-Zubaidi renewed his contract with Al-Taawoun until 2021. On 26 July 2021, Al-Zubaidi joined newly promoted Pro League side Al-Tai. On 18 July 2022, Al-Zubaidi joined Al-Ahli. On 30 January 2024, Al-Zubaidi joined Abha on a six-month loan. On 18 July 2024, Al-Zubaidi joined Al-Orobah on a free transfer.

On 6 September 2025, Al-Zubaidi announced his retirement from football.

== Honours ==
Al-Nassr

- Pro League: 2013–14, 2014–15
- Crown Prince Cup: 2013–14

Al-Taawoun

- King Cup: 2019

Al-Ahli

- Saudi First Division League: 2022–23
