= Abdulrahman Khayrallah =

Saudi Arabian footballer

Personal information
- Full name: Abdulrahman Fahad Khayrallah
- Date of birth: February 23, 1996 (age 30)
- Place of birth: Riyadh, Saudi Arabia
- Height: 1.80 m (5 ft 11 in)
- Position: Winger

Youth career
- Al-Shabab

Senior career*
Years	Team	Apps	(Gls)
2015–2018	Al-Shabab	15	(1)
2017–2018	→ Al-Taawoun (loan)	3	(0)
2018–2019	Al-Washm	10	(0)
2019–2020	Al-Jabalain	12	(0)
2020	Al-Khaleej	8	(0)
2020–2022	Al-Bukiryah		
2022–2023	Al-Diriyah		
2023–2024	Al-Lewaa		
- * Club domestic league appearances and goals

Abdulrahman Khayrallah (Arabic: عبد الرحمن خير الله, born 23 February 1996) is a Saudi Arabian football player who plays as a winger.
