= Nasser Al-Daajani =

Saudi Arabian footballer

Personal information
- Full name: Nasser Saad Al-Daajani
- Date of birth: 17 January 1997 (age 29)
- Place of birth: Saudi Arabia
- Height: 1.71 m (5 ft 7 1/2 in)
- Position: Midfielder

Team information
- Current team: Abha
- Number: 8

Youth career
- 2009–2018: Al-Ahli

Senior career*
Years	Team	Apps	(Gls)
2018–2020	Al-Ahli	0	(0)
2018	→ Fátima (loan)	0	(0)
2019–2020	→ Al-Taawoun (loan)	11	(0)
2020–2021	Al-Adalah	18	(0)
2021–2023	Al-Qadsiah	13	(0)
2023–2024	Al-Ain	27	(0)
2024–	Al-Ula	22	(4)
2025–2026	→ Abha (loan)	23	(4)
2026–	Abha	4	(0)

International career
2016–2017	Saudi Arabia U20		
- * Club domestic league appearances and goals as of 3 September 2026

Nasser Al-Daajani (Arabic: ناصر الدعجاني; born 17 January 1997) is a Saudi Arabian professional footballer who plays as a midfielder for Saudi Pro League club Abha.

== Career ==
Al-Daajani started his career in the youth setup of Al-Ahli. On 1 February 2017, he signed a three-year contract with the club, which also happened to be his first professional one. On 31 July 2018, Al-Daajani signed a four-year contract with Al-Ahli and was subsequently loaned out to Portuguese side Fátima until the end of the 2019–20 season. However, the loan was cut short and Al-Daajani returned to Saudi Arabia. On 25 January 2019, Al-Daajani joined Al-Taawoun until the end of the 2019–20 season. On 28 July 2021, Al-Daajani joined Al-Qadsiah. On 28 July 2023, Al-Daajani joined Al-Ain. On 4 August 2024, Al-Daajani joined Al-Ula. On 17 August 2025, Al-Daajani joined Abha on loan from Al-Ula.

== Honours ==
Al-Taawoun

- King Cup: 2019
