= Yassin Barnawi =

Saudi Arabian footballer

Yaseen Barnawi
Personal information
- Full name: Yaseen Omar Barnawi
- Date of birth: October 1, 1993 (age 33)
- Place of birth: Riyadh, Saudi Arabia
- Position: Right back

Team information
- Current team: Al-Faisaly
- Number: 2

Youth career
- –2013: Al Shabab

Senior career*
Years	Team	Apps	(Gls)
2013–2015	Al-Faisaly	26	(0)
2015	Al-Nassr	0	(0)
2015–2019	Al-Qadsiah	80	(0)
2019	→ Al-Ittihad (loan)	2	(0)
2019–2021	Al-Taawoun	40	(0)
2021–	Al-Faisaly	0	(0)

International career
2014–2016	Saudi Arabia U23		
- * Club domestic league appearances and goals

Yaseen Omar Barnawi (Arabic: ياسين برناوي; also spelled Yassin; born October 1, 1993) is a Saudi Arabian football player who plays as a right back for Al-Faisaly.

He joined Al-Qadisiyah FC in the Winter of 2015, having left the Al-Faisaly club of Harmah.
