= Cássio (footballer, born August 1980) =

Brazilian footballer

Personal information
- Full name: Cássio Albuquerque dos Anjos
- Date of birth: 12 August 1980 (age 46)
- Place of birth: Rio de Janeiro, Brazil
- Height: 1.86 m (6 ft 1 in)
- Position: Goalkeeper

Youth career
- Botafogo
- 1999–2000: Olaria

Senior career*
Years	Team	Apps	(Gls)
2001	Olaria		
2002	Bangu	11	(0)
2002	America-RJ		
2003	Olaria	6	(0)
2004–2007	Vasco da Gama	75	(0)
2004	→ Olaria (loan)	10	(0)
2004	→ Macaé (loan)		
2008	Macaé	15	(0)
2008–2013	Paços Ferreira	127	(0)
2013–2014	Arouca	27	(0)
2014–2018	Rio Ave	111	(0)
2018–2022	Al Taawoun	115	(0)
2023	Felgueiras 1932	3	(0)
2023–2024	Paredes	0	(0)
Total		500	(0)
- * Club domestic league appearances and goals

Cássio Albuquerque dos Anjos (born 12 August 1980), known simply as Cássio, is a Brazilian former professional footballer who played as a goalkeeper.

== Club career ==
=== Brazil ===
During most of his career in his homeland, Rio de Janeiro-born Cássio played mostly for modest clubs. He started out at Olaria Atlético Clube in 2001 and moved to Bangu Atlético Clube the following year, where he appeared in the 2002 edition of the Campeonato Carioca as the first-team regulars were playing in the Torneio Rio – São Paulo.

Cássio returned to Olaria in 2003, after a short stint at America Football Club. In 2004, he signed with CR Vasco da Gama and was immediately loaned back to Olaria for that year's Carioca.

Cássio only became a regular starter in the 2006 season, playing 35 Série A games to help his team to sixth place. In December 2007, following the arrivals of Tiago and Ricardo, he terminated his contract.

On 11 January 2008, Cássio was presented at Macaé Esporte Futebol Clube, whom he had previously represented. He left the club on 7 April, after featuring regularly.

=== Portugal ===
In 2008, Cássio moved to Portugal and joined F.C. Paços de Ferreira, being first choice for most of his spell with the Primeira Liga side. He was also the starter during the 2010–11 Taça da Liga, in which his team lost in the final against S.L. Benfica.

Cássio did not miss a minute of action in 2012–13, as Paços finished a best-ever third and qualified for the UEFA Champions League for the first time in its history. He only conceded 29 goals during the campaign.

After leaving the Estádio da Mata Real, Cássio continued to play in the Portuguese top division, for F.C. Arouca and later Rio Ave F.C. and starting in four seasons out of five.

=== Saudi Arabia ===
On 9 June 2018, the 38-year-old Cássio signed a one-year deal with Saudi Pro League club Al Taawoun FC as a replacement for Essam El Hadary, seven years his senior. The following 2 May, he was in goal as his side defeated Al-Ittihad Club in the final of the King's Cup.

Cássio was released on 22 July 2022, despite having one year left in his contract.

== Honours ==
Al Taawoun

- King's Cup: 2019

Individual

- Saudi Pro League Goalkeeper of the Month: January 2021, February 2021
