= Nildo Petrolina =

Brazilian footballer

Personal information
- Full name: Evanildo Fernandes Gomes
- Date of birth: 1 May 1986 (age 40)
- Place of birth: Petrolina, Brazil
- Height: 1.70 m (5 ft 7 in)
- Position: Midfielder

Senior career*
Years	Team	Apps	(Gls)
2008–2009	Petrolina		
2009–2010	Salgueiro		
2010–2011	Trofense	26	(8)
2011–2013	Beira-Mar	56	(8)
2013–2014	Videoton	21	(2)
2014–2016	Arouca	20	(2)
2016–2017	Moreirense	42	(3)
2017–2019	Aves	35	(5)
2019–2020	Al Taawoun	38	(5)
2021	Leixões	1	(0)
2022–2023	Juazeirense	27	(2)
2024–2025	Petrolina	12	(0)
- * Club domestic league appearances and goals as of 16:40, 15 May 2025 (UTC)

Evanildo Fernandes Gomes (born 1 May 1986), known as Nildo Petrolina, is a Brazilian professional footballer who plays as a midfielder.

He spent most of his career in Portugal, making 153 Primeira Liga appearances for Beira-Mar, Arouca, Moreirense and Aves and scoring 18 goals. He won the Taça da Liga with the third of those clubs in 2017, and the Taça de Portugal with the fourth a year later.

== Club career ==
Born in Petrolina, Pernambuco, Petrolina only played lower league football in his country. In 2010, the 24-year old moved to Portugal where he would spend the vast majority of his professional career, starting out at C.D. Trofense in the Segunda Liga.

Petrolina signed with Primeira Liga club S.C. Beira-Mar for the 2011–12 season. He made his debut in the competition on 14 August 2011, starting and playing 80 minutes in a 0–0 away draw against C.S. Marítimo. His first goal arrived two weeks later, when he helped his team to a 3–0 away win over Vitória de Guimarães.

On 5 July 2014, after one year in Hungary with Videoton FC where he scored eight goals from 35 competitive appearances, Petrolina signed a two-year contract with F.C. Arouca also of the Portuguese top division. In late January 2016, however, he joined Moreirense F.C. in the same league.

In May 2017, Petrolina and compatriot teammate Diego Galo moved to C.D. Aves. He played six games as they won the Taça de Portugal for the first time, and scored the only goal from the penalty spot as they defeated Caldas S.C. in the semi-final first leg on 28 February 2018.

Petrolina left Portugal on 9 January 2019, when he signed for Pedro Emanuel's Al Taawoun FC of the Saudi Pro League. A year later, he extended his deal for another.

In July 2021, Petrolina joined Leixões S.C. in the Portuguese second tier. The 35-year-old announced his retirement in October, only to return to his country with Sociedade Desportiva Juazeirense in February 2022.

== Honours ==
Videoton

- Ligakupa runner-up: 2013–14

Moreirense

- Taça da Liga: 2016–17

Aves

- Taça de Portugal: 2017–18

Al Taawoun

- King's Cup: 2019
