= Ryan Al-Mousa =

Saudi Arabian footballer (born 1994)

Personal information
- Full name: Ryan Sadeeq Eisa Al-Mousa
- Date of birth: 24 July 1994 (age 32)
- Place of birth: Saudi Arabia
- Height: 1.77 m (5 ft 10 in)
- Positions: Defensive midfielder; centre back

Youth career
- –2015: Al Ahli

Senior career*
Years	Team	Apps	(Gls)
2013–2018	Al Ahli	5	(0)
2017	→ Al-Raed (loan)	6	(0)
2017–2018	→ Al-Taawoun (loan)	22	(0)
2018–2022	Al-Taawoun	69	(0)
2022–2023	Damac	16	(0)
2023–2024	Al-Hazem	12	(0)
2025	Jeddah	10	(0)
- * Club domestic league appearances and goals as of 14 August 2023 (UTC)

Ryan Al-Mousa (Arabic: ريان الموسى; born 24 July 1994) is a Saudi professional footballer who plays as a defensive midfielder.

== Club career ==
He started out at Al-Ahli at the youth academy where he developed his talent, and was loaned to Al-Raed in 2017. He made 6 appearances, 1 start, before returning to Al-Ahli at the end of the season. On 9 July 2017 he joined Al-Taawoun on loan until the end of the 2017–18 season.

On 22 July 2022, Al-Mousa joined Damac on a three-year deal.

On 7 September 2023, Al-Mousa joined Al-Hazem.

== Honours ==
Al-Ahli

- Saudi Professional League: 2015-16
- King Cup: 2016
- Saudi Crown Prince Cup: 2014–15

Al-Taawoun

- King Cup: 2019
