= Hussain Shae'an =

Saudi Arabian footballer

Personal information
- Full name: Hussain Abdoh Yahya Shae'an
- Date of birth: 23 May 1989 (age 37)
- Place of birth: Riyadh, Saudi Arabia
- Height: 1.88 m (6 ft 2 in)
- Position: Goalkeeper

Senior career*
Years	Team	Apps	(Gls)
2008–2014	Al-Shabab	14	(0)
2014	→ Al-Hilal (loan)	3	(0)
2014–2018	Al-Nassr	33	(0)
2018–2021	Al-Taawoun	4	(0)
2021–2023	Al-Shabab	2	(0)
2023–2024	Al-Okhdood	0	(0)

International career^{‡}
2010–2012	Saudi Arabia U23	3	(0)
2012	Saudi Arabia	1	(0)
- * Club domestic league appearances and goals as of 16 December 2018 (UTC) ‡ National team caps and goals as of 16 December 2018 (UTC)

Hussain Shae'an (Arabic: حسين شيعان; born 23 May 1989) is a Saudi Arabian footballer who plays as a goalkeeper.

== Career ==
On 30 June 2023, Shae'an joined Al-Okhdood on a free transfer.
