= Mohammed Harzan =

Saudi Arabian footballer

Personal information
- Full name: Mohammed Mohsen Mohammed Harzan Asiri
- Date of birth: 12 January 1989 (age 37)
- Place of birth: Tabuk, Saudi Arabia
- Height: 1.67 m (5 ft 6 in)
- Position: Winger

Team information
- Current team: Al-Watani
- Number: 75

Youth career
- Al-Suqoor

Senior career*
| Years | Team | Apps | (Gls) |
| 2010–2012 | Al-Suqoor | | |
| 2012–2013 | Al-Watani | | |
| 2013–2014 | Al-Suqoor | | |
| 2014–2016 | Al-Watani | | |
| 2016–2018 | Ohod | 49 | (1) |
| 2018–2020 | Al-Taawoun | 5 | (0) |
| 2019 | → Al-Hazem (loan) | 10 | (0) |
| 2020–2021 | Damac | 37 | (1) |
| 2021–2023 | Al-Tai | 33 | (3) |
| 2023–2025 | Ohod | 36 | (1) |
| 2024 | → Neom (loan) | 9 | (3) |
| 2025– | Al-Watani | | |
- * Club domestic league appearances and goals as of 22 May 2023

Mohammed Harzan (Arabic: محمد حرزان; born 12 January 1989) is a Saudi Arabian professional footballer who plays as a winger for Al-Watani.

== Club career ==
Mohammed Harzan started his career at the youth teams of hometown club Al-Suqoor and was promoted to the first team in 2010. On 3 December 2011, Harzan left Al-Suqoor and joined derby rivals Al-Watani. On 15 June 2013, Harzan joined Al-Orobah. However, the transfer failed to go through and Harzan joined former club Al-Suqoor. On 14 December 2013, Harzan joined Al-Watani once again. On 18 July 2016, Harzan joined Ohod. With Ohod, Harzan helped the club earn promotion to the Pro League for the first time since 2005. On 4 May 2018, Harzan joined Al-Taawoun on a two-year deal. On 6 January 2019, Harzan joined Al-Hazem on a six-month loan. On 20 January 2020, Harzan joined Damac on a permanent deal. On 14 July 2021, Harzan joined Al-Tai on a free transfer. On 20 July 2023, Harzan joined Ohod once again. On 31 January 2024, Harzan joined Neom on a six-month loan.

== Honours ==
Al-Suqoor/Neom

- Saudi Second Division League: 2023–24, third place 2010–11

Ohod

- Saudi First Division League runners-up: 2016–17
