= Cédric Amissi =

Burundian footballer (born 1990)

Personal information
- Full name: Cédric Amissi
- Date of birth: 2 July 1990 (age 36)
- Place of birth: Bujumbura, Burundi
- Height: 1.73 m (5 ft 8 in)
- Position: Midfielder

Senior career*
Years	Team	Apps	(Gls)
2009–2011	Prince Louis		
2011–2014	Rayon Sports		
2014–2017	FC Chibuto		
2017	União da Madeira	13	(5)
2017–2022	Al-Taawoun	118	(16)
2022–2023	Al-Qadsiah	47	(5)
2023–2026	Kiyovu Sport		
2026–	Inter Star Bujumbura		

International career^{‡}
2009–	Burundi	45	(10)
- * Club domestic league appearances and goals as of 29 December 2017 ‡ National team caps and goals as of 4 September 2019

Cédric Amissi (born 2 July 1990) is a Burundian footballer who plays as a midfielder for the Burundi national team. He played for Burundi internationals in the 2014 and 2018 FIFA World Cup qualifiers.

== International career ==
=== International goals ===
Scores and results list Burundi's goal tally first.

No.	Date	Venue	Opponent	Score	Result	Competition
1.	15 November 2011	Prince Louis Rwagasore Stadium, Bujumbura, Burundi	Lesotho	1–2	2–2	2014 FIFA World Cup qualification
2.	25 November 2011	National Stadium, Dar es Salaam, Tanzania	Somalia	3–1	4–1	2011 CECAFA Cup
3.	1 December 2011	National Stadium, Dar es Salaam, Tanzania	Uganda	1–0	1–0	2011 CECAFA Cup
4.	12 November 2015	Prince Louis Rwagasore Stadium, Bujumbura, Burundi	DR Congo	1–1	2–3	2018 FIFA World Cup qualification
5.	12 November 2015	Prince Louis Rwagasore Stadium, Bujumbura, Burundi	DR Congo	2–1	2–3	2018 FIFA World Cup qualification
6.	10 June 2017	Prince Louis Rwagasore Stadium, Bujumbura, Burundi	South Sudan	1–0	3–0	2019 Africa Cup of Nations qualification
7.	16 November 2018	Juba Stadium, Juba, South Sudan	South Sudan	2–1	5–2	2019 Africa Cup of Nations qualification
8.	23 March 2019	Prince Louis Rwagasore Stadium, Bujumbura, Burundi	Gabon	1–1	1–1	2019 Africa Cup of Nations qualification
9.	17 June 2019	Stade Olympique de Radès, Radès, Tunisia	Tunisia	1–1	1–2	Friendly
10.	4 September 2019	Prince Louis Rwagasore Stadium, Bujumbura, Burundi	Tanzania	1–0	1–1	2022 FIFA World Cup qualification

== Honours ==
Al-Taawoun

- King Cup: 2019
