= Sandro Manoel =

Brazilian footballer

Personal information
- Full name: Sandro Manoel dos Santos
- Date of birth: 23 July 1988 (age 38)
- Place of birth: Recife, Brazil
- Height: 1.76 m (5 ft 9 in)
- Position: Defensive midfielder

Youth career
- 2005–2007: Náutico
- 2007: → Cruzeiro (loan)

Senior career*
Years	Team	Apps	(Gls)
2008–2011	Cruzeiro	5	(0)
2008	→ Marília (loan)		
2008	→ Ipatinga (loan)	9	(0)
2009	→ Democrata (loan)		
2009	→ Uberlândia (loan)		
2009	→ Ituiutaba (loan)		
2010	→ Democrata (loan)		
2011	→ Nacional-MG (loan)		
2012–2014	Santa Cruz	57	(1)
2014–2015	Ceará	9	(0)
2015–2022	Al-Taawon	126	(6)
2017	→ Al-Fateh (loan)	11	(1)
2017–2018	→ Al-Fateh (loan)	25	(1)
2022	Al Ahli	9	(0)
2022–2023	Al-Arabi	25	(0)
- * Club domestic league appearances and goals as of 29 August 2015

Sandro Manoel dos Santos (born 23 July 1988), or simply Sandro Manoel, is a Brazilian professional footballer plays as a defensive midfielder.

He made his professional debut for Cruzeiro in a 1–0 home defeat to Rio Branco-MG on 13 March 2008 in the Minas Gerais State Championship.

== Honours ==
Santa Cruz

- Campeonato Pernambucano: 2012, 2013
- Campeonato Brasileiro Série C: 2013

Al-Taawon

- Kings Cup (Saudi Arabia): 2019
