= Rabee Sufyani =

Saudi Arabian footballer

Personal information
- Full name: Rabee Sufyani
- Date of birth: 26 January 1987 (age 39)
- Place of birth: Riyadh, Saudi Arabia
- Height: 1.81 m (5 ft 11 in)
- Position: Winger

Youth career
- ???–2008: Al-Hilal

Senior career*
Years	Team	Apps	(Gls)
2008–2014	Al-Fateh	110	(25)
2014–2017	Al-Nassr	9	(1)
2014–2015	→ Al-Fateh (loan)	15	(0)
2016	→ Al-Taawoun (loan)	12	(7)
2017–2018	Al-Ittihad	29	(4)
2018–2020	Al-Taawoun	47	(5)
2020–2021	Al-Ain	13	(2)
2022	Hajer	16	(0)
2022–2023	Jeddah	19	(0)

International career^{‡}
2012–2019	Saudi Arabia	8	(2)
- * Club domestic league appearances and goals as of 17 May 2019 (UTC) ‡ National team caps and goals as of 10 August 2019 (UTC)

Rabee Sufyani (Arabic: ربيع سفياني; born 26 January 1987) is a Saudi football player who plays as a winger.

== Career statistics ==
=== International ===
Statistics accurate as of match played 10 August 2019.

Team	Year	Apps	Goals
Saudi Arabia
Saudi Arabia	2012	3	1
Saudi Arabia	2019	5	1
Saudi Arabia	Total	8	2

=== International goals ===
Scores and results list Saudi Arabia's goal tally first.

No.	Date	Venue	Opponent	Score	Result	Competition
1.	14 October 2012	Prince Abdullah bin Jalawi Stadium, Al-Hasa, Saudi Arabia	Congo	2–2	3–2	Friendly
2.	4 August 2019	Franso Hariri Stadium, Erbil, Iraq	Kuwait	1–0	1–2	2019 WAFF Championship

== Honours ==
=== Club ===
Al-Fateh

- Pro League: 2012-13
- Saudi Super Cup: 2013

Al-Nassr

- Pro League: 2013–14
- Saudi Crown Prince Cup: 2013–14

Al-Ittihad

- Saudi Crown Prince Cup: 2016–17
- King Cup: 2018

Al-Taawoun

- King Cup: 2019
