= 2019 King's Cup (Saudi Arabia) =

2019 King Cup
Tournament details
- Country: Saudi Arabia
- Dates: 1 January – 2 May 2019
- Teams: 64

Final positions
- Champions: Al-Taawoun
- Runners-up: Al-Ittihad

Tournament statistics
- Matches played: 63
- Goals scored: 225 (3.57 per match)
- Top goal scorer(s): Abderrazak Hamdallah (14 goals)
- All statistics correct as of 2 May 2019.

The 2019 King Cup, or The Custodian of the Two Holy Mosques Cup, was the 44th edition of the King Cup since its establishment in 1957, and the 1st under the current format. It started on 1 January and concluded with the final on 2 May 2019. As winners of the tournament, Al-Taawoun qualified for the 2020 AFC Champions League group stage.

Al-Taawoun won their first title after a 2–1 win over defending champions Al-Ittihad in the final on 2 May 2019.

== Format changes ==
On 9 February 2018, the Saudi FF announced that the number of teams were increased from 32 to 64 teams to accommodate the increased number of teams in the leagues. All Pro League, MS League, and Second Division teams will compete in the tournament under the new format as well as the four winners from the Third Division playoffs.

== Participating teams ==
A total of 64 teams participated in this season. 16 teams from the Pro league, 20 teams from the MS League, 24 teams from the Second Division and 4 teams qualifying from the preliminary stage.

League	Teams
Pro League	Al-Ahli; Al-Batin; Al-Ettifaq; Al-Faisaly; Al-Fateh; Al-Fayha; Al-Hazem; Al-Hilal; Al-Ittihad ^{TH}; Al-Nassr; Al-Qadsiah; Al-Raed; Al-Shabab; Al-Taawoun; Al-Wehda; Ohod
MS League	Abha; Al-Adalh; Al-Ain; Al-Ansar; Al-Jabalain; Al-Jeel; Al-Kawkab; Al-Khaleej; Al-Mujazzal; Al-Nahda; Al-Nojoom; Al-Orobah; Al-Qaisumah; Al-Shoulla; Al-Tai; Al-Washm; Damac; Hajer; Jeddah; Najran
Second Division	Afif; Al-Akhdoud; Al-Arabi; Al-Bukayriyah; Al-Dera'a; Al-Diriyah; Al-Ghazwah; Al-Hait; Al-Hejaz; Al-Jandal; Al-Jubail; Al-Kholood; Al-Muzahimiyyah; Al-Riyadh; Al-Sadd; Al-Sahel; Al-Sharq; Al-Suqoor; Al-Taqadom; Al-Thoqbah; Al-Watani; Arar; Hetten; Wej
Third Division	Al-Amjad; Al-Nairyah; Al-Qotah; Al-Shaheed

== Bracket ==
Round of 64
A	Al-Ittihad (a.e.t.)	3
H	Al-Jubail	1
H	Al-Washm	2
A	Al-Sadd	1
H	Ohod	2
A	Al-Sharq	0
A	Al-Tai	0
H	Al-Taqadom	3
A	Al-Batin	2
H	Al-Hejaz	1
A	Al-Shoulla (pen.)	1 (5)
H	Al-Suqoor	1 (4)
H	Al-Raed	5
A	Arar	1
H	Najran	0
A	Al-Ain	1
A	Al-Hazem	1
H	Al-Kholood	0
A	Al-Kawkab	1 (2)
H	Al-Jeel (pen.)	1 (3)
A	Al-Qadsiah	0
H	Al-Bukayriyah	1
A	Al-Jabalain	0
H	Abha	4
H	Al-Fayha	6
A	Al-Shaheed	2
A	Al-Mujazzal	2
H	Wej (a.e.t.)	4
A	Al-Nassr	6
H	Al-Jandal	0
H	Al-Watani	0
A	Al-Ansar	2
H	Al-Ahli	4
A	Al-Riyadh	0
A	Al-Nojoom	2
H	Al-Akhdoud	0
H	Al-Wehda	6
A	Al-Nairyah	1
H	Al-Orobah	3
A	Al-Thoqbah	2
H	Al-Taawoun	1
A	Al-Adalh	0
H	Al-Nahda	3
A	Hetten	2
H	Al-Shabab	3
A	Al-Sahel	0
A	Jeddah	3
H	Al-Ghazwah	2
H	Al-Ettifaq	3
A	Al-Diriyah	0
H	Damac	0
A	Al-Amjad (a.e.t.)	1
A	Al-Fateh	2
H	Al-Arabi	1
H	Al-Qaisumah	2
A	Al-Qotah	1
H	Al-Faisaly	2
A	Afif	0
H	Al-Khaleej	5
A	Al-Muzahimiyyah	1
H	Al-Hilal	9
A	Al-Dera'a	0
A	Hajer	1
H	Al-Hait	0

Round of 32
A	Al-Ittihad	2
H	Al-Washm	1
A	Ohod	0
H	Al-Taqadom	2
A	Al-Batin	1
H	Al-Shoulla	0
H	Al-Raed (pen.)	2 (3)
A	Al-Ain	2 (1)
H	Al-Hazem	0
A	Al-Jeel	1
H	Al-Bukayriyah	0
A	Abha	4
A	Al-Fayha	1
H	Wej	0
H	Al-Nassr	5
A	Al-Ansar	0
A	Al-Ahli	1
H	Al-Nojoom	0
A	Al-Wehda	1
H	Al-Orobah	0
H	Al-Taawoun	6
A	Al-Nahda	0
A	Al-Shabab	2
H	Jeddah	0
H	Al-Ettifaq	9
A	Al-Amjad	1
A	Al-Fateh	0
H	Al-Qaisumah	3
A	Al-Faisaly (a.e.t.)	2
H	Al-Khaleej	1
A	Al-Hilal	3
H	Hajer	0

Round of 16
A	Al-Ittihad	3
H	Al-Taqadom	0
H	Al-Batin (a.e.t.)	2
A	Al-Raed	1
A	Al-Jeel (a.e.t.)	1
H	Abha	0
H	Al-Fayha	0
A	Al-Nassr	6
H	Al-Ahli	1 (1)
A	Al-Wehda (pen.)	1 (3)
H	Al-Taawoun	3
A	Al-Shabab	0
A	Al-Ettifaq	4
H	Al-Qaisumah	1
A	Al-Faisaly	2
H	Al-Hilal	3

Quarter-finals
H	Al-Ittihad	4
A	Al-Batin	3
A	Al-Jeel	0
H	Al-Nassr	4
A	Al-Wehda	0
H	Al-Taawoun	3
H	Al-Ettifaq	2
A	Al-Hilal (a.e.t.)	3

Semi-finals
H	Al-Ittihad (a.e.t.)	4
A	Al-Nassr	2
A	Al-Taawoun	5
H	Al-Hilal	0

Final
–	Al-Ittihad	1
–	Al-Taawoun	2

Note: H: Home team, A: Away team

Source: SAFF

== Round of 64 ==
The Round of 64 matches were played between 1 and 5 January 2019. All times are local, AST (UTC+3).

1 January 2019 11	Al-Bukayriyah (3)	1–0	Al-Qadsiah (1)	Al Bukayriyah
15:25	Al-Ghamdi 82'; Al-Saudi (yellow card) 90+5'	Report	Yago (yellow card) 24'; Masrahi (yellow card) 90+2'	Stadium: Al-Bukayriyah Club Stadium; Referee: Mohamed Marie'e

1 January 2019 5	Al-Hejaz (3)	1–2	Al-Batin (1)	Al Bahah
15:45	Khalil 82'	Report	Crysan 65' (pen.); Mohsen 90'	Stadium: King Saud Sports City Stadium; Referee: Turki Hashlan

1 January 2019 13	Al-Fayha (1)	6–2	Al-Shaheed (4)	Al Majma'ah
18:00	Al Salem 27', 60'; Abdali 46'; Al-Qahtani 55'; Al-Owdah 63'; Ruiz 80'	Report	Al-Ghamdi 21'; Asiri 29'	Stadium: King Salman Sport City Stadium; Referee: Abdullah Al-Shehri

2 January 2019 23	Al-Shabab (1)	3–0	Al-Sahel (3)	Riyadh
15:20	Kaabi 19'; Găman 35'; Luiz Antônio 37'; Al Omran (yellow card) 65'	Report	Majrashi (yellow card) 64'	Stadium: Prince Khalid bin Sultan Stadium; Referee: Raed Al-Zahrani

2 January 2019 9	Al-Kholood (3)	0–1	Al-Hazem (1)	Al Bukayriyah
15:25		Report	Muralha 44'	Stadium: Al-Bukayriyah Club Stadium; Referee: Sultan Al-Harbi

2 January 2019 27	Al-Arabi (3)	1–2	Al-Fateh (1)	Buraidah
15:25	Al-Howail 52'	Report	Al-Juhaim 20'; Bangoura 44'	Stadium: King Abdullah Sport City Stadium; Referee: Faisal Al-Balawi

2 January 2019 32	Al-Hait (3)	0–1	Hajer (2)	Ha'il
15:30		Report	Al-Solan 67'	Stadium: Prince Abdul Aziz bin Musa'ed Stadium; Referee: Abdullah Al-Nuhait

2 January 2019 29	Al-Faisaly (1)	2–0	Afif (3)	Al Majma'ah
18:00	Akpala 5'; Calderón 27'; Al-Thani (yellow card) 72'	Report		Stadium: King Salman Sport City Stadium; Referee: Shukri Al-Hanfoush

3 January 2019 28	Al-Qaisumah (2)	2–1	Al-Qotah (4)	Hafar al-Batin
15:15	Boakye 48'; Al-Enezi 85'	Report	Al-Tamimi 13' (pen.)	Stadium: Al-Batin Club Stadium; Referee: Mohammed Al-Amri

3 January 2019 15	Al-Jandal (3)	0–6	Al-Nassr (1)	Sakakah
15:35	Al-Doknan (yellow card) 26' (yellow-red card) 49'; Al-Junaidi (yellow card) 27'	Report	Hamdallah 29', 66', 80'; Musa 47', 90+1'; Giuliano 88'	Stadium: Al-Orobah Club Stadium; Referee: Khaled Salwi

3 January 2019 12	Abha (2)	4–0	Al-Jabalain (2)	Abha
15:45	Tchoumbé 5'; Al-Qahtani 41'; Khanfir 82'; Al-Enezi 89'	Report		Stadium: Prince Sultan bin Abdul Aziz Stadium; Referee: Sami Al-Jires

3 January 2019 26	Damac (2)	0–1 (a.e.t.)	Al-Amjad (4)	Khamis Mushait
15:45		Report	Farwi 103'	Stadium: Damac Club Stadium; Referee: Maytham Al-Daleem

3 January 2019 22	Al-Nahda (2)	3–2	Hetten (3)	Dammam
17:40	Al-Dossari 43', 61'; Al-Ghamdi (yellow card) 69'; Al-Amoudi 76', (yellow card) 85'	Report	Al-Shadhli 68'; Matri 90+3'	Stadium: Prince Fahd bin Salman Stadium; Referee: Ahmed Al-Barakati

3 January 2019 10	Al-Jeel (2)	1–1 (a.e.t.) (3–2 p)	Al-Kawkab (2)	Al-Hasa
19:30	Omar 23'	Report	Rguiî 90+4' (pen.)	Stadium: Prince Abdullah bin Jalawi Stadium; Referee: Hussain Abo Shaheen

3 January 2019 19	Al-Wehda (1)	6–1	Al-Nairyah (4)	Mecca
19:50	Abdu Jaber 14', 24', 45', 54' (pen.); Al-Qathami (yellow card) 21', (goal) 30', 60'	Report	Al-Enezi 88'	Stadium: King Abdul Aziz Stadium; Referee: Majed Al-Shamrani

4 January 2019 2	Al-Washm (2)	2–1	Al-Sadd (3)	Shaqra
15:25	Al-Shammeri 6'; Khairallah 20'	Report	Sami 17'	Stadium: Al-Washm Club Stadium; Referee: Ahmed Al-Remeikhany

4 January 2019 20	Al-Orobah (2)	3–2	Al-Thoqbah (3)	Sakakah
15:35	Yanogo 26'; Al-Sharari 51'; Al-Shameri 77'	Report	El Mannae'e 34' (pen.); Yahia 44'	Stadium: Al-Orobah Club Stadium; Referee: Abdullah Al-Awidan

4 January 2019 18	Al-Akhdoud (3)	0–2	Al-Nojoom (2)	Khamis Mushait
15:45		Report	Khattab 61'; Kouao 86'	Stadium: Damac Club Stadium; Referee: Abdulrahman Al-Shehri

4 January 2019 8	Najran (2)	0–1	Al-Ain (2)	Abha
15:45		Report	Al-Zahrani 65'	Stadium: Prince Sultan bin Abdul Aziz Stadium; Referee: Mohammed Al-Smail

4 January 2019 14	Wej (3)	4–2 (a.e.t.)	Al-Mujazzal (2)	Ta'if
15:50	Al-Mousa 28'; Al-Marzouqi (yellow card) 69'; Al-Boqami 84'; Al-Mowallad (yellow card) 94'; Al-Turki (yellow card) 102'; Salawati 109', (yellow card) 116'; Al-Mosaabi 120+1'	Report	Awaji 45'; Al-Ogaily (yellow card) 67'; Al-Yousef 70'; Sufyani (yellow card) 116'	Stadium: King Fahd Stadium; Referee: Abdullah Al-Kharboush

4 January 2019 6	Al-Suqoor (3)	1–1 (a.e.t.) (4–5 p)	Al-Shoulla (2)	Tabuk
15:50	Al-Enezi 66'	Report	Afana 37'	Stadium: Reserve Stadium in King Khalid Sport City; Referee: Khaled Al-Johani
	Penalties
	Al-Balawi (penalty scored); Al-Johani (penalty scored); Al-Qadi (penalty scored); Mutair (penalty scored); Kaabi (penalty missed); Al-Enezi (penalty missed)		Daouda (penalty scored); Al-Dossari (penalty scored); Afana (penalty scored); Moukoro (penalty scored); Itoua (penalty missed); Al-Mutairi (penalty scored)

4 January 2019 21	Al-Taawoun (1)	1–0	Al-Adalh (2)	Buraidah
18:05	Tawamba 69'; Al-Olayan (yellow card) 90+2'	Report	Andria (yellow card) 55'; Boufalgha (yellow card) 78'	Stadium: King Abdullah Sport City Stadium; Referee: Abdullah Dhafer

4 January 2019 24	Al-Ghazwah (3)	2–3	Jeddah (2)	Medina
18:30	Al-Subahi 8'; Abdullah 72'	Report	Al-Johani 32'; Samti 45+2'; Zoe 50'; Al-Jubairi (yellow card) 78'	Stadium: Prince Mohammed bin Abdul Aziz Stadium; Referee: Mohammed Al-Nuhait

4 January 2019 1	Al-Jubail (3)	1–3 (a.e.t.)	Al-Ittihad (1)	Dammam
19:50	Adams 74' (pen.), (yellow card) 102'; Al-Aboud (yellow card) 87'	Report	Romarinho 45', 108'; Al-Sumairi (yellow card) 56'; Assiri 104'	Stadium: Prince Mohamed bin Fahd Stadium; Referee: Mohammed Al-Hoaish

5 January 2019 30	Al-Khaleej (2)	5–1	Al-Muzahimiyyah (3)	Saihat
15:00	Sharoma 3'; Al-Qeed 31'; Al-Motawaa 67' (pen.), 73'; Al-Trais 71'	Report	90'	Stadium: Al-Khaleej Club Stadium; Referee: Faisal Al-Balawi

5 January 2019 25	Al-Ettifaq (1)	3–0	Al-Diriyah (3)	Dammam
15:00	Al-Aboud 48'; Al-Selouli 53'; Al-Hazaa 90+2'	Report	Al-Dossari (yellow card) 23'; Al-Bishi (yellow card) 50'	Stadium: Prince Mohamed bin Fahd Stadium; Referee: Shukri Al-Hanfoush

5 January 2019 31	Al-Hilal (1)	9–0	Al-Dera'a (3)	Riyadh
15:20	Rivas 17', 68', 88'; Gomis 32', 51', 64', 72'; Carrillo 82'; Al-Rashed 85' (o.g.)	Report	Hawsawi (yellow card) 3'	Stadium: King Saud University Stadium; Referee: Sultan Al-Harbi

5 January 2019 4	Al-Taqadom (3)	3–0	Al-Tai (2)	Al Bukayriyah
15:30	Douglas 26'; Al-Harbi 34', 65'	Report		Stadium: Al-Bukayriyah Club Stadium; Referee: Hussain Abo Shaheen

5 January 2019 7	Al-Raed (1)	5–1	Arar (3)	Buraidah
15:30	Al-Shoraimi 28', (yellow card) 61'; Abo Shararah 48' (pen.); Al-Shehri 51', 65'; Hasani 77'	Report	Gharbi 35'; Fernando (yellow card) 63'	Stadium: King Abdullah Sport City Stadium; Referee: Sultan Al-Okairy

5 January 2019 16	Al-Watani (3)	0–2	Al-Ansar (2)	Tabuk
15:50		Report	Hassan 63'; Al-Hojaili 90+1'	Stadium: Reserve Stadium in King Khalid Sport City; Referee: Mohammed Al-Qarni

5 January 2019 3	Ohod (1)	2–0	Al-Sharq (3)	Medina
18:30	Al-Asmari 18'; Eisa 73'	Report		Stadium: Prince Mohammed bin Abdul Aziz Stadium; Referee: Mohammed Al-Buraidi

5 January 2019 17	Al-Ahli (1)	4–0	Al-Riyadh (3)	Mecca
19:55	Asiri 28'; Al-Mousa 37'; Djaniny 41'; Al-Zaqrati 69'	Report		Stadium: King Abdul Aziz Stadium; Referee: Mohammed Al-Hoaish

== Round of 32 ==
The Round of 32 matches were played between 14 and 18 January 2019. All times are local, AST (UTC+3).

14 January 2019 38	Al-Bukayriyah (3)	0–4	Abha (2)	Al Bukayriyah
15:35		Report	Hamani 4' (o.g.); Al-Enezi 24', (yellow card) 36'; Al-Nabit 28'; Assiri (yellow card) 83'; Al-Reemi 90' (o.g.)	Stadium: Al-Bukayriyah Club Stadium; Referee: Mohammed Al-Smail

15 January 2019 47	Al-Khaleej (2)	1–2 (a.e.t.)	Al-Faisaly (1)	Dammam
15:10	Al-Trais (yellow card) 53'; Al-Qeed 68'; Al-Motawaa (yellow card) 70'; Al-Hamdhi (yellow card) 94'; Al-Nashi (yellow card) 116'	Report	Abousaban (yellow card) 65'; Calderón 80'; Al Ansari 105+1'; Hyland (yellow card) 116'	Stadium: Prince Mohamed bin Fahd Stadium; Referee: Raed Al-Zahrani

15 January 2019 34	Al-Taqadom (3)	2–0	Ohod (1)	Buraidah
15:35	Al-Sibiyani 7'; Al-Hadhriti 54' (pen.); Al-Johaim (yellow card) 89'	Report	Al-Dhaw (yellow card) 45'; Hazzazi (yellow card) 53'; Medjani (yellow card) 78'	Stadium: King Abdullah Sport City Stadium; Referee: Abdullah Al-Awidan

15 January 2019 39	Wej (3)	0–1	Al-Fayha (1)	Ta'if
15:55	Al-Abdeli (yellow card) 90+2'	Report	Al-Najrani 29'; Kanno (yellow card) 65'; Al-Sobhi (yellow card) 70'	Stadium: King Fahd Stadium; Referee: Hussain Abo Shaheen

15 January 2019 40	Al-Nassr (1)	5–0	Al-Ansar (2)	Riyadh
19:30	Hamdallah 7', 9', 84', 86'; Al-Jebreen (yellow card) 48'; Giuliano 74'	Report	Muaaz (yellow card) 30'	Stadium: King Fahd International Stadium; Referee: Majed Al-Shamrani

16 January 2019 33	Al-Washm (2)	1–2	Al-Ittihad (1)	Shaqra
15:30	Saïed 10'; Al-Dawsari (yellow card) 14'	Report	Romarinho 45+2'; Muath (yellow card) 50'; Rodrigues (yellow card) 55' (yellow-red card) 56'; Mustafa 90+5'	Stadium: Al-Washm Club Stadium; Referee: Abdullah Dhafer

16 January 2019 36	Al-Raed (1)	2–2 (a.e.t.) (3–1 p)	Al-Ain (2)	Buraidah
15:35	Farhan (yellow card) 38'; Al-Shehri 50', 114'; Amora (yellow card) 56'; Belkaroui (yellow card) 79'; Jamal (yellow card) 119'	Report	Ouattara (yellow card) 73'; Diego Assis 86'; Dieng (yellow card) 90+1'; Al-Zahrani 108'; Majrashi (yellow card) 117'	Stadium: King Abdullah Sport City Stadium; Referee: Sami Al-Jires
	Penalties
	Hasani (penalty scored); Al-Showaish (penalty missed); Al-Meqren (penalty missed); Amora (penalty scored); Al-Shehri (penalty scored)		Dieng (penalty missed); Ba Adheem (penalty scored); Diego Assis (penalty missed); Ouattara (penalty missed)

16 January 2019 42	Al-Orobah (2)	0–1	Al-Wehda (1)	Sakakah
15:45	Abo Shahin (yellow card) 25'	Report	Al-Qathami (yellow card) 39'; Renato Chaves 78'	Stadium: Al-Orobah Club Stadium; Referee: Shukri Al-Hanfoush

16 January 2019 48	Hajer (2)	0–3	Al-Hilal (1)	Al-Hasa
17:55		Report	Gomis 21' (pen.), 80'; Carlos Eduardo 63'	Stadium: Prince Abdullah bin Jalawi Stadium; Referee: Khaled Al-Teris

17 January 2019 46	Al-Qaisumah (2)	3–0	Al-Fateh (1)	Hafar al-Batin
15:25	Salami 22'; Chibane 30'; Al-Sahali 45+2'; Khemir (yellow card) 82'; Al-Mutairi (yellow card) 86'	Report	Al-Majhad (yellow card) 90+1'	Stadium: Al-Batin Club Stadium; Referee: Mohammed Al-Nuhait

17 January 2019 35	Al-Shoulla (2)	0–1	Al-Batin (1)	Al-Kharj
15:25	Al-Dossari (yellow card) 43'	Report	Jhonnattann 58'	Stadium: Al-Shoulla Club Stadium; Referee: Abdullah Al-Nuhait

17 January 2019 37	Al-Hazem (1)	0–1	Al-Jeel (2)	Al Bukayriyah
15:35		Report	Kadu Fernandes 52'	Stadium: Al-Bukayriyah Club Stadium; Referee: Abdulrahman Al-Shammari

18 January 2019 45	Al-Ettifaq (1)	9–1	Al-Amjad (4)	Dammam
15:10	Al-Hazaa 4' (pen.), 66', 86'; Dahl 43' (o.g.); Akaïchi 56', 64'; Guanca 75', 83'; El Sayed 80'	Report	Al-Khedewi (yellow card) 10'; Hakami (yellow card) 76'; Faraji 79'; Shamhani (yellow card) 84'; Dahl (yellow card) 90+1'	Stadium: Prince Mohamed bin Fahd Stadium; Referee: Mohammed Al-Hoaish

18 January 2019 43	Al-Taawoun (1)	6–0	Al-Nahda (2)	Buraidah
15:35	Petrolina 19'; Tawamba 33', 70'; Adam 40'; Sandro Manoel 45+2' (pen.); Héldon 82'	Report	Coulibaly (yellow card) 50'	Stadium: King Abdullah Sport City Stadium; Referee: Khaled Salwi

18 January 2019 41	Al-Nojoom (2)	0–1	Al-Ahli (1)	Al-Hasa
17:55		Report	Al-Mowalad (yellow card) 15'; Djaniny 27' (pen.); Díaz (yellow card) 80'; Al-Harbi (yellow card) 88'	Stadium: Prince Abdullah bin Jalawi Stadium; Referee: Sultan Al-Harbi

18 January 2019 44	Jeddah (2)	0–2	Al-Shabab (1)	Jeddah
20:00	Al-Jubairi (yellow card) 43'; Al-Muwallad (yellow card) 47'; Zoe (yellow card) 89'	Report	Budescu (yellow card) 18', (goal) 49'; Benlamri (yellow card) 90+1'; Kaabi 90+3'	Stadium: King Abdullah Sports City; Referee: Faisal Al-Balawi

== Round of 16 ==
The Round of 16 matches were played between 21 and 23 January 2019. All times are local, AST (UTC+3).

21 January 2019 52	Al-Fayha (1)	0–6	Al-Nassr (1)	Al Majma'ah
18:15	Buhimed (red card) 70'; Asprilla (yellow card) 85'	Report	Al-Jumeiah (yellow card) 11', (goal) 86'; Al-Jebreen (yellow card) 21'; Giuliano 52'; Hamdallah 56', 59', 72', 81'	Stadium: King Salman Sport City Stadium; Referee: Ovidiu Hațegan (Romania)

21 January 2019 49	Al-Taqadom (3)	0–3	Al-Ittihad (1)	Buraidah
18:20	Al-Johaim (yellow card) 79'	Report	Al-Ammar 2'; Romarinho 35', 42'; Al-Daheem (yellow card) 75'	Stadium: King Abdullah Sport City Stadium; Referee: Khaled Al-Teris

21 January 2019 56	Al-Hilal (1)	3–2	Al-Faisaly (1)	Riyadh
20:05	Gomis 19'; Carlos Eduardo (yellow card) 33'; Al-Dawsari 79'; Rivas 83'	Report	Rogerinho 2', 37'; Mendash (yellow card) 31'; Al-Sowayed (yellow card) 41'; Malayekah (yellow card) 89'	Stadium: King Saud University Stadium; Referee: Milorad Mažić (Serbia)

22 January 2019 50	Al-Batin (1)	2–1 (a.e.t.)	Al-Raed (1)	Hafar al-Batin
15:30	Jhonnattann 19'; Baraka (yellow card) 25'; Nasser (yellow card) 58'; Waqes (yellow card) 70'; Al-Ghamdi 108'	Report	Hasani 49'; Farhan (yellow card) 70'; Al-Meqren (yellow card) 80'	Stadium: Al-Batin Club Stadium; Referee: Shukri Al-Hanfoush

22 January 2019 51	Abha (2)	0–1 (a.e.t.)	Al-Jeel (2)	Abha
15:55		Report	Al-Suwiei (yellow card) 41'; Al-Fadhl (yellow card) 61'; Al-Abdullah (yellow card) 76'; Al-Morair (yellow card) 88'; Al-Khamis (yellow card) 104'; Edgar Gomes 111'	Stadium: Prince Sultan bin Abdul Aziz Stadium; Referee: Faisal Al-Balawi

23 January 2019 55	Al-Qaisumah (2)	1–4	Al-Ettifaq (1)	Hafar al-Batin
15:30	Sherifi (yellow card) 40'; Salami 55'	Report	Al-Kwikbi (yellow card) 8', (goal) 15'; Ben Youssef 10', 72'; Alemán (yellow card) 44'; Al-Hazaa 61'	Stadium: Al-Batin Club Stadium; Referee: Mohammed Al-Hoaish

23 January 2019 54	Al-Taawoun (1)	3–0	Al-Shabab (1)	Buraidah
18:20	Sufyani 10'; Héldon 41' (pen.); Al-Zubaidi 45'; Amissi (yellow card) 55'	Report	Boussoufa (yellow card) 37'; Ben Mustapha (yellow card) 45'; Luiz Antônio (yellow card) 48'; Ghazi (yellow card) 56'	Stadium: King Abdullah Sport City Stadium; Referee: Ovidiu Hațegan (Romania)

23 January 2019 53	Al-Ahli (1)	1–1 (a.e.t.) (1–3 p)	Al-Wehda (1)	Jeddah
20:05	Al-Harbi (yellow card) 18'; Djaniny 40'; Abdulghani (yellow card) 55'	Report	Mebarakou (yellow card) 33'; Amr (yellow card) 61'; Renato Chaves (yellow card) 77'; Otero 85'; Bakshween (yellow card) 109'	Stadium: King Abdullah Sports City; Referee: Milorad Mažić (Serbia)
	Penalties
	Djaniny (penalty scored); Al-Mousa (penalty missed); Abdulghani (penalty missed); Díaz (penalty missed)		Marcos Guilherme (penalty missed); Darwish (penalty scored); Renato Chaves (penalty scored); Otero (penalty scored)

== Quarter-finals ==
The Quarter-finals were played on 1 and 2 April 2019. All times are local, AST (UTC+3).

1 April 2019 60	Al-Ettifaq (1)	2–3 (a.e.t.)	Al-Hilal (1)	Dammam
18:35	Al-Kwikbi 28' (pen.); Arias (yellow card) 64'; Al-Aboud (yellow card) 75'; Guanca 87', (yellow card) 112'; Akaïchi (yellow card) 90+1'; Al-Sonain (yellow card) 100'	Report	Kanno (yellow card) 32'; Al-Khaibri (yellow card) 38'; Al-Shalhoub 65'; Jahfali 90+5'; Carrillo 105'; Al-Yami (yellow card) 117'	Stadium: Prince Mohamed bin Fahd Stadium; Referee: Matthew Conger (New Zealand)

1 April 2019 57	Al-Ittihad (1)	4–3	Al-Batin (1)	Jeddah
20:35	Al-Sumairi (yellow card) 36'; Prijović 44' (pen.), 58'; Sanogo (yellow card) 52'; Al-Harbi 69'; Romarinho 72'; Villanueva (yellow card) 82'	Report	Al-Shammari 11'; Crysan 38'; Kanabah (yellow card) 74'; Jhonnattann 75', (yellow card) 82'; Al-Ghamdi (yellow card) 89'	Stadium: King Abdullah Sports City; Attendance: 15,214; Referee: Damir Skomina (Slovenia)

1 April 2019 58	Al-Nassr (1)	4–0	Al-Jeel (2)	Riyadh
20:35	Al-Jumeiah 10', (yellow card) 45+1'; Petros 73', 90'; Hamdallah 86' (pen.)	Report	Al-Hunain (yellow card) 58'; Abu Bakr (yellow card) 85'; Anderson (yellow card) 90+2'	Stadium: King Fahd International Stadium; Referee: Artur Soares Dias (Portugal)

2 April 2019 59	Al-Taawoun (1)	3–0	Al-Wehda (1)	Buraidah
19:00	Al-Mousa (yellow card) 45+2'; Tawamba 58'; Sandro Manoel 60'; Adam 64'	Report	Renato Chaves (yellow card) 44'; Bakshween (yellow card) 66'; Otero (yellow card) 89'	Stadium: King Abdullah Sport City Stadium; Referee: Bakary Gassama (Gambia)

== Semi-finals ==
The Semi-finals were played on 26 and 27 April 2019. All times are local, AST (UTC+3).

26 April 2019 62	Al-Hilal (1)	0–5	Al-Taawoun (1)	Riyadh
19:00		Report	Al-Zubaidi (yellow card) 10', (goal) 86'; Sandro Manoel 19'; Adam 22'; Amissi 56'; Tawamba 81'	Stadium: King Saud University Stadium; Referee: Danny Makkelie (Netherlands)

27 April 2019 61	Al-Ittihad (1)	4–2 (a.e.t.)	Al-Nassr (1)	Jeddah
19:25	El Ahmadi (yellow card) 34'; Prijović 44' da Costa (yellow card) 45+2'; Al-Muwallad 60', (yellow card) 71'; Assiri (yellow card) 91'; Romarinho 96', 106'	Report	Petros (yellow card) 43'; Hamdallah 66', 89' (pen.), (yellow card) 115'	Stadium: King Abdullah Sports City; Attendance: 43,375; Referee: Felix Brych (Germany)

== Final ==
The final was played on 2 May 2019 at the King Fahd International Stadium in Riyadh. All times are local, AST (UTC+3).

2 May 2019
20:45

Al-Ittihad	1–2	Al-Taawoun
Prijović 32'; El Ahmadi (yellow card) 71'	Report	Al-Absi 55'; Al-Mousa (yellow card) 60'; Petrolina (yellow card) 61'; Sandro Manoel (yellow card) 76'; Tawamba 90'

King Fahd International Stadium, Riyadh
Attendance: 58,223
Referee: Néstor Pitana (Argentina)

== Top goalscorers ==
As of 2 May 2019

Rank	Player	Club	Goals
1	(Morocco) Abderrazak Hamdallah	Al-Nassr	14
2	(Brazil) Romarinho	Al-Ittihad	8
3	(France) Bafétimbi Gomis	Al-Hilal	7
4	(Cameroon) Léandre Tawamba	Al-Taawoun	6
5	(Saudi Arabia) Hazaa Al-Hazaa	Al-Ettifaq	5
6	(Eritrea) Ahmed Abdu Jaber	Al-Wehda	4
6	(Saudi Arabia) Saleh Al-Shehri	Al-Raed	4
6	(Venezuela) Gelmin Rivas	Al-Hilal	4
6	(Serbia) Aleksandar Prijović	Al-Ittihad	4
10	(Brazil) Giuliano	Al-Nassr	3
10	(Cape Verde) Djaniny	Al-Ahli	3
10	(Argentina) Cristian Guanca	Al-Ettifaq	3
10	(Brazil) Jhonnattann	Al-Batin	3
10	(Brazil) Sandro Manoel	Al-Taawoun	3
10	(Saudi Arabia) Abdulfattah Adam	Al-Taawoun	3

Note: Players and teams marked in bold are still active in the competition.
