= 2018–19 Al-Wehda Club season =

Al-Wehda
2018–19 season
- President: Hatem Khaimi
- Manager: Fábio Carille (until 13 December); Mido (from 5 January until 19 March); Juan Brown (from 20 March)
- Stadium: King Abdul Aziz Stadium
- Pro League: 7th
- King Cup: Quarter-finals (knocked out by Al-Taawoun)
- Top goalscorer: League: Marcos Guilherme (9); All: Ahmed Abdu Jaber (11)
- Highest home attendance: 32,567 vs Al-Hilal (11 November 2018)
- Lowest home attendance: 437 vs Al-Faisaly (12 April 2019)
| Home colours | Away colours | Third colours |
- All statistics correct as of 2 December 2018.

The 2018–19 season was Al-Wehda's 74th season in their existence and first season back in the Pro League following their promotion last season. Along with competing in the Pro League, the club also participated in the King Cup.

The season covers the period from 1 July 2018 to 30 June 2019.

== Players ==
=== Squad information ===
As of 5 February 2018

Note: Flags indicate national team as defined under FIFA eligibility rules; some limited exceptions apply. Players may hold more than one non-FIFA nationality.

| No. | Pos. | Nation | Player |
|---|---|---|---|
| 1 | GK | EGY | Mohamed Awad (on loan from Al Ismaily) |
| 2 | DF | KSA | Radhi Al-Otaibi |
| 4 | MF | KSA | Waleed Bakshween |
| 5 | MF | TUR | Emre Çolak |
| 6 | DF | BRA | Renato Chaves |
| 7 | MF | KSA | Mohammed Al-Qathami |
| 8 | MF | KSA | Abdulellah Al-Malki |
| 10 | MF | VEN | Rómulo Otero (on loan from Atlético Mineiro) |
| 11 | MF | BRA | Marcos Guilherme |
| 12 | DF | KSA | Abdullah Al-Zori |
| 13 | GK | KSA | Abdulquddus Atiah |
| 15 | MF | KSA | Saleh Al-Amri |
| 16 | MF | KSA | Ali Al-Nemer |
| 19 | FW | COD | Kabongo Kasongo (on loan from Zamalek) |
| 20 | FW | KSA | Jaber Asiri |

| No. | Pos. | Nation | Player |
|---|---|---|---|
| 21 | DF | KSA | Ahmed Al-Shamrani |
| 23 | DF | KSA | Abdulelah Al-Amri (on loan from Al-Nassr) |
| 25 | DF | KSA | Faisel Darwish |
| 26 | MF | KSA | Mohammed Al-Sufyani |
| 27 | DF | KSA | Fawaz Al-Sqoor |
| 28 | DF | KSA | Abdullah Al-Shammari |
| 29 | MF | KSA | Nawaf Al-Harthi |
| 30 | GK | KSA | Moataz Akjah |
| 31 | DF | KSA | Sari Amr |
| 33 | GK | KSA | Abdullah Al-Jadaani |
| 66 | MF | KSA | Mohammed Al-Qarni |
| 71 | FW | ERI | Ahmed Abdu Jaber |
| 77 | MF | TUN | Issam Jebali |
| 87 | MF | BRA | Anselmo |
| 92 | DF | ALG | Zidane Mebarakou |

== Transfers ==
=== In ===
| Date | Pos. | Name | Previous club | Fee | Source |
|---|---|---|---|---|---|
| 27 May 2018 | DF | (Saudi Arabia) Abdullah Al-Zori | (Saudi Arabia) Al-Hilal | Free | |
| 27 May 2018 | DF | (Saudi Arabia) Faisel Darwish | (Saudi Arabia) Al-Hilal | Free | |
| 27 May 2018 | MF | (Saudi Arabia) Waleed Bakshween | (Saudi Arabia) Al-Ahli | Free | |
| 31 May 2018 | MF | (Turkey) Emre Çolak | (Spain) Deportivo La Coruña | £900,000 | |
| 9 June 2018 | MF | (Brazil) Marcos Guilherme | (Brazil) Atlético Paranaense | £3,600,000 | |
| 10 June 2018 | MF | (Brazil) Anselmo | (Brazil) Internacional | £2,700,000 | |
| 12 June 2018 | FW | (Brazil) Fernandão | (Turkey) Fenerbahçe | £2,300,000 | |
| 5 July 2018 | DF | (Saudi Arabia) Fawaz Al-Sqoor | (Saudi Arabia) Najran | Undisclosed | |
| 5 July 2018 | FW | (Eritrea) Ahmed Abdu Jaber | (Saudi Arabia) Al-Tai | Free | |
| 13 July 2018 | MF | (Saudi Arabia) Saleh Al-Amri | (Saudi Arabia) Al-Ahli | Free | |
| 17 July 2018 | MF | (Saudi Arabia) Ali Al-Nemer | (Saudi Arabia) Al-Shabab | Undisclosed | |
| 4 August 2018 | DF | (Brazil) Renato Chaves | (Brazil) Fluminense | Free | |
| 23 August 2018 | DF | (Saudi Arabia) Osama Hawsawi | (Saudi Arabia) Al-Hilal | Free | |
| 23 August 2018 | MF | (Brazil) Régis | (Brazil) Bahia | Undisclosed | |
| 26 December 2018 | DF | (Saudi Arabia) Abdullah Al-Shammari | (Saudi Arabia) Al-Ittihad | Free | |
| 27 January 2019 | MF | (Tunisia) Issam Jebali | (Norway) Rosenborg | Undisclosed | |
| 28 February 2019 | MF | (Saudi Arabia) Mohammed Al-Qarni | (Saudi Arabia) Al-Shabab | Free | |

=== Loans in ===
| Date | Pos. | Name | Parent club | End date | Source |
|---|---|---|---|---|---|
| 29 April 2018 | GK | (Egypt) Mohamed Awad | (Egypt) Al Ismaily | End of season | |
| 27 May 2018 | DF | (Saudi Arabia) Abdulelah Al-Amri | (Saudi Arabia) Al-Nassr | End of season | |
| 1 June 2018 | MF | (Venezuela) Rómulo Otero | (Brazil) Atlético Mineiro | End of season | |
| 19 August 2018 | MF | (Saudi Arabia) Taisir Al-Jassim | (Saudi Arabia) Al-Ahli | 25 January 2019 | |
| 1 January 2019 | FW | (Democratic Republic of the Congo) Kabongo Kasongo | (Egypt) Zamalek | End of season | |
| 18 January 2019 | DF | (Algeria) Zidane Mebarakou | (Algeria) MC Alger | End of season | |

=== Out ===
| Date | Pos. | Name | New club | Fee | Source |
|---|---|---|---|---|---|
| 12 June 2018 | DF | (Saudi Arabia) Abdulrahman Al-Harbi | Released | Free | |
| 12 June 2018 | DF | (Saudi Arabia) Muaaz Al-Zanbaqi | Released | Free | |
| 12 June 2018 | DF | (Saudi Arabia) Moayed Ghrowi | Released | Free | |
| 12 June 2018 | MF | (Saudi Arabia) Abdulaziz Al-Sahali | Released | Free | |
| 12 June 2018 | MF | (Saudi Arabia) Fawaz Al-Sulami | Released | Free | |
| 12 June 2018 | MF | (Saudi Arabia) Ammar Anwar | Released | Free | |
| 12 June 2018 | MF | (Saudi Arabia) Loay Hawsawi | Released | Free | |
| 26 June 2018 | DF | (Saudi Arabia) Amer Haroon | Released | Free | |
| 26 June 2018 | MF | (Saudi Arabia) Majed Al-Deeni | Released | Free | |
| 26 June 2018 | MF | (Saudi Arabia) Sultan Al-Dossari | (Saudi Arabia) Al-Shoulla | Free | |
| 26 June 2018 | MF | (Saudi Arabia) Abdullah Al Muwallad | Released | Free | |
| 26 June 2018 | MF | (Saudi Arabia) Bader Al-Shahrani | Released | Free | |
| 26 June 2018 | MF | (Saudi Arabia) Abdurahman Al-Sherif | Released | Free | |
| 12 July 2018 | DF | (Saudi Arabia) Bandar Baajaj | (Saudi Arabia) Al-Tai | Free | |
| 15 July 2018 | DF | (Saudi Arabia) Fahad Al-Johani | (Saudi Arabia) Al-Ain | Free | |
| 18 July 2018 | DF | (Saudi Arabia) Kamel Al-Mor | (Saudi Arabia) Jeddah | Free | |
| 20 July 2018 | MF | (Saudi Arabia) Al Baraa Ba Adheem | (Saudi Arabia) Al-Ain | Free | |
| 25 July 2018 | DF | (Saudi Arabia) Sami Bashir | (Saudi Arabia) Al-Kholood | Free | |
| 26 July 2018 | DF | (Saudi Arabia) Mahmoud Muaaz | (Saudi Arabia) Al-Ansar | Free | |
| 30 July 2018 | FW | (Saudi Arabia) Farid Al-Harbi | (Saudi Arabia) Al-Ain | Free | |
| 31 July 2018 | GK | (Saudi Arabia) Ahmed Al-Ghamdi | (Saudi Arabia) Al-Raed | Free | |
| 10 September 2018 | GK | (Saudi Arabia) Abdullah Al-Arraf | (Saudi Arabia) Al-Taawoun | Free | |
| 26 December 2018 | DF | (Saudi Arabia) Osama Hawsawi | Retired | | |
| 10 January 2019 | MF | (Saudi Arabia) Muhannad Al-Faresi | (Saudi Arabia) Damac | Free | |
| 23 January 2019 | FW | (Brazil) Fernandão | (Brazil) Bahia | Undisclosed | |
| 5 February 2019 | DF | (Saudi Arabia) Sultan Tankar | (Saudi Arabia) Al-Shoulla | Free | |

=== Loans out ===
| Date | Pos. | Name | Subsequent club | End date | Source |
|---|---|---|---|---|---|
| 6 January 2019 | FW | (Saudi Arabia) Mousa Madkhali | (Saudi Arabia) Al-Ain | End of season | |
| 9 January 2019 | MF | (Saudi Arabia) Issam Al-Qarni | (Saudi Arabia) Damac | End of season | |

== Pre-season friendlies ==
| 26 July 2018 Friendly | Al-Wehda (Saudi Arabia) | 3–0 | (Slovenia) Krka | Axams, Austria |
| 16:00 CEST | Çolak; Al-Qathami; Al-Sufyani | Report | | Stadium: Ruifachstadion Axams |

| 30 July 2018 Friendly | Al-Wehda (Saudi Arabia) | 1–1 | (Italy) Udinese | Klagenfurt, Austria |
| 18:00 CEST | Al-Nemer 83' | Report | Lasagna 86' | Stadium: Wörthersee Stadion |

| 5 August 2018 Friendly | Al-Wehda (Saudi Arabia) | 0–1 | (Germany) Bayer Leverkusen | Grödig, Austria |
| 15:30 CEST | | Report | Havertz 26' | Stadium: Untersberg-Arena |

| 11 August 2018 Friendly | Al-Wehda (Saudi Arabia) | 4–2 | (United Arab Emirates) Al Wahda | Wörgl, Austria |
| 15:00 CEST | Otero 15'; Al-Amri 27'; Assiri 47'; Al-Harthi 60' | Report | Chang-woo 50'; Tagliabué 77' | Stadium: Sportzentrum Wörgl |

| 13 August 2018 Friendly | Al-Wehda (Saudi Arabia) | 4–0 | Kuwait U23 | Oberhaching, Germany |
| 17:00 CEST | Chaves 27'; Otero 36', 49'; Assiri 82' | Report | | Stadium: Hauptplatz Deisenhofen |

| 19 August 2018 Friendly | Al-Wehda (Saudi Arabia) | 1–2 | (Egypt) Pyramids | Cairo, Egypt |
| 19:05 EET | Marcos Guilherme 18' (pen.) | Report | Gabr 33'; Tolba 90' | Stadium: 30 June Stadium |

== Competitions ==
=== Overall ===
| Competition | Started round | Current position / round | Final position / round | First match | Last match |
|---|---|---|---|---|---|
| Saudi Pro League | — | — | 7th | 30 August 2018 | 16 May 2019 |
| King Cup | Round of 64 | — | Quarter-finals | 3 January 2019 | 2 April 2019 |

Last Updated: 16 May 2019

=== Saudi Pro League ===
==== League table ====
| Pos | Team | Pld | W | D | L | GF | GA | GD | Pts | Qualification or relegation |
|---|---|---|---|---|---|---|---|---|---|---|
| 5 | Al-Shabab | 30 | 15 | 9 | 6 | 39 | 25 | +14 | 54 | Qualification for Arab Club Champions Cup |
| 6 | Al-Faisaly | 30 | 12 | 7 | 11 | 51 | 47 | +4 | 43 | |
| 7 | Al-Wehda | 30 | 12 | 6 | 12 | 41 | 41 | 0 | 42 | |
| 8 | Al-Raed | 30 | 10 | 8 | 12 | 38 | 48 | −10 | 38 | |
| 9 | Al-Fateh | 30 | 8 | 11 | 11 | 32 | 45 | −13 | 35 | |

Source: spl.com
Rules for classification: 1) Points; 2) Head-to-head points; 3) Head-to-head goal difference; 4) Total goal difference; 5) Total goals scored; 6) Play-off (only for deciding champion, relegation and AFC competitions participation).

==== Results summary ====
| Overall | | | | | | | | Home | | | | | | Away | | | | | |
| Pld | W | D | L | GF | GA | GD | Pts | W | D | L | GF | GA | GD | W | D | L | GF | GA | GD |
|---|---|---|---|---|---|---|---|---|---|---|---|---|---|---|---|---|---|---|---|
| 30 | 12 | 6 | 12 | 41 | 41 | 0 | 42 | 8 | 1 | 6 | 23 | 19 | +4 | 4 | 5 | 6 | 18 | 22 | −4 |

Last updated: 16 May 2019.
Source: Competitive matches

==== Results by round ====
| Round | 1 | 2 | 3 | 4 | 5 | 6 | 7 | 8 | 9 | 10 | 11 | 12 | 13 | 14 | 15 | 16 | 17 | 18 | 19 | 20 | 21 | 22 | 23 | 24 | 25 | 26 | 27 | 28 | 29 | 30 |
|---|---|---|---|---|---|---|---|---|---|---|---|---|---|---|---|---|---|---|---|---|---|---|---|---|---|---|---|---|---|---|
| Ground | A | A | H | A | A | H | A | H | H | H | A | H | A | A | H | H | H | H | A | A | H | A | H | A | A | H | H | A | H | A |
| Result | D | D | W | D | W | W | W | L | L | W | W | L | L | L | W | W | D | L | W | L | W | D | D | L | L | W | L | L | W | L |
| Position | 13 | 10 | 6 | 6 | 4 | 4 | 4 | 4 | 5 | 4 | 4 | 5 | 6 | 6 | 6 | 5 | 5 | 6 | 5 | 6 | 6 | 6 | 6 | 6 | 7 | 6 | 7 | 7 | 7 | 7 |

Updated to match(es) played on 16 May 2019. Source: Competitive matches
A = Away; H = Home; W = Win; D = Draw; L = Loss

==== Matches ====
All times are local, AST (UTC+3).

Win Draw Loss Postponed

| 30 August 2018 1 | Al-Hazem | 0–0 | Al-Wehda | Buraidah |
| 19:05 | Al-Ayyaf (yellow card) 41'; Al-Barakah (yellow card) 81' | Report | | Stadium: King Abdullah Sport City Stadium; Attendance: 2,133; Referee: Tobias Welz (Germany) |

| 13 September 2018 2 | Al-Fateh | 0–0 | Al-Wehda | Al-Hasa |
| 18:30 | Al-Fuhaid (yellow card) 88'; Lajami (yellow card) 90+3' | Report | Renato Chaves (yellow card) 29'; Anselmo (yellow card) 71'; Darwish (yellow card) 90+1' | Stadium: Prince Abdullah bin Jalawi Stadium; Attendance: 1,437; Referee: Anastasios Sidiropoulos (Greece) |

| 22 September 2018 3 | Al-Wehda | 4–1 | Al-Raed | Mecca |
| 19:00 | Fernandão 6', 17'; Renato Chaves (yellow card) 9'; Abdu Jaber 83'; Marcos Guilherme 90+5' | Report | El Ghanassy 52'; Al-Shoraimi (yellow card) 80' | Stadium: King Abdul Aziz Stadium; Attendance: 17,235; Referee: Mark Clattenburg (England) |

| 26 September 2018 4 | Al-Ittihad | 2–2 | Al-Wehda | Jeddah |
| 20:35 | Al-Sumairi (yellow card) 45'; Al-Aryani 53'; Villanueva 58'; Bajandouh (yellow card) 76'; Jurman (yellow card) 90' | Report | Anselmo (yellow card) 32'; Çolak 34'; Renato Chaves 60' | Stadium: King Abdullah Sports City; Attendance: 35,504; Referee: Cüneyt Çakır (Turkey) |

| 6 October 2018 5 | Al-Qadsiah | 0–1 | Al-Wehda | Khobar |
| 18:00 | Oumarou (yellow card) 14' | Report | Al-Malki (yellow card) 33'; Abdu Jaber 87' | Stadium: Prince Saud bin Jalawi Stadium; Attendance: 1,700; Referee: Pavel Královec (Czech Republic) |

| 18 October 2018 6 | Al-Wehda | 2–1 | Al-Fayha | Mecca |
| 18:35 | Al-Malki (yellow card) 15'; Otero 58', (yellow card) 90+1'; Fernandão (yellow card) 74'; Buhimed 86' (o.g.) | Report | Tziolis (yellow card) 39'; Kanno (yellow card) 74'; Hawsawi 77' (o.g.) | Stadium: King Abdul Aziz Stadium; Referee: Danny Makkelie (Netherlands) |

| 26 October 2018 7 | Ohod | 1–3 | Al-Wehda | Medina |
| 18:25 | Teikeu (yellow card) 64'; Al-Dhaw 85'; Aashor (yellow card) 90+6' | Report | Marcos Guilherme 48'; Al-Zori 61'; Otero 68' | Stadium: Prince Mohammed bin Abdul Aziz Stadium; Referee: Ivan Bebek (Croatia) |

| 1 November 2018 8 | Al-Wehda | 0–1 | Al-Shabab | Mecca |
| 18:25 | Renato Chaves (yellow card) 20' | Report | Bahebri 51'; Al-Shamrani (yellow card) 85' | Stadium: King Abdul Aziz Stadium; Referee: Mark Clattenburg (England) |

| 11 November 2018 9 | Al-Wehda | 0–3 | Al-Hilal | Mecca |
| 18:20 | | Report | Al-Faraj 18'; Carlos Eduardo 29'; Al-Dawsari 45+2'; Al-Breik (yellow card) 90' | Stadium: King Abdul Aziz Stadium; Attendance: 32,567; Referee: Paweł Gil (Poland) |

| 22 November 2018 10 | Al-Wehda | 1–0 | Al-Batin | Mecca |
| 18:20 | Al-Jassim 22'; Renato Chaves (yellow card) 76'; Al-Malki (yellow card) 85'; Awad (yellow card) 86' | Report | Kanabah (yellow card) 74' | Stadium: King Abdul Aziz Stadium; Attendance: 2,089; Referee: Svein Oddvar Moen (Norway) |

| 2 December 2018 11 | Al-Nassr | 1–2 | Al-Wehda | Riyadh |
| 17:45 | Giuliano 10'; Al-Dossari (yellow card) 42' | Report | Marcos Guilherme (yellow card) 23'; Abdu Jaber 62', 74' | Stadium: Prince Faisal bin Fahd Stadium; Attendance: 4,763; Referee: Sandro Ricci (Brazil) |

| 7 December 2018 12 | Al-Wehda | 0–1 | Al-Taawoun | Mecca |
| 18:20 | | Report | Al-Mufarrej (yellow card) 59'; Héldon 76'; Al-Olayan (yellow card) 79' | Stadium: King Abdul Aziz Stadium; Attendance: 3,683; Referee: João Capela (Portugal) |

| 13 December 2018 13 | Al-Ettifaq | 2–1 | Al-Wehda | Dammam |
| 17:30 | Guanca 49', 74'; Al-Hazaa (yellow card) 90+5' | Report | Marcos Guilherme 41' (pen.) | Stadium: Prince Mohamed bin Fahd Stadium; Attendance: 2,485; Referee: Mark Clattenburg (England) |

| 20 December 2018 14 | Al-Faisaly | 3–0 | Al-Wehda | Al Majma'ah |
| 17:50 | Luisinho 1', (yellow card) 71'; Igor Rossi 17'; Al-Bishi 47'; Malayekah (yellow card) 68'; Al-Shamrani (yellow card) 90+3' | Report | Renato Chaves (yellow card) 82'; Fernandão (yellow card) 90+6' | Stadium: King Salman Sport City Stadium; Attendance: 720; Referee: Pavel Královec (Czech Republic) |

| 28 December 2018 15 | Al-Wehda | 2–1 | Al-Ahli | Mecca |
| 18:30 | Otero 5'; Bakshween (yellow card) 90+8'; Marcos Guilherme 90+9' | Report | Al-Mousa (yellow card) 47'; Díaz (yellow card) 62' (yellow-red card) 89'; Jurado (yellow card) 85'; Al Somah 90+4'; Alexis (yellow card) 90+7' | Stadium: King Abdul Aziz Stadium; Referee: Ovidiu Hațegan (Romania) |

| 10 January 2019 16 | Al-Wehda | 1–0 | Al-Fateh | Mecca |
| 18:35 | Al-Malki (yellow card) 38'; Amr (yellow card) 77'; Marcos Guilherme 90+2' | Report | Al-Hassan (yellow card) 33'; Al-Fuhaid (red card) 71' | Stadium: King Abdul Aziz Stadium; Attendance: 846; Referee: Viktor Kassai (Hungary) |

| 28 January 2019 17 | Al-Wehda | 1–1 | Al-Hazem | Mecca |
| 18:50 | Abdu Jaber 3'; Bakshween (yellow card) 55' | Report | Igboananike 67'; Tsiskaridze (yellow card) 88' | Stadium: King Abdul Aziz Stadium; Attendance: 1,933; Referee: Daniel Stefanski (Poland) |

| 4 February 2019 18 | Al-Wehda | 0–2 | Al-Ittihad | Mecca |
| 20:15 | Bakshween (yellow card) 83'; Marcos Guilherme (yellow card) 86'; Al-Amri (yellow card) 90+5' | Report | da Costa 22'; Al-Muwallad 56' (pen.) | Stadium: King Abdul Aziz Stadium; Attendance: 15,708; Referee: Svein Oddvar Moen (Norway) |

| 9 February 2019 19 | Al-Raed | 1–3 | Al-Wehda | Buraidah |
| 15:50 | Hammoudan 11', (yellow card) 43'; Kanu (yellow card) 61'; Al-Showaish (red card) 71' | Report | Renato Chaves 29'; Otero (yellow card) 45+1'; Al-Sqoor 52', (yellow card) 84'; Marcos Guilherme 90+7' | Stadium: King Abdullah Sport City Stadium; Attendance: 1,883; Referee: Khaled Al-Teris |

| 15 February 2019 20 | Al-Shabab | 1–0 | Al-Wehda | Riyadh |
| 18:30 | Boussoufa (yellow card) 23'; Sebá (red card) 27'; Luiz Antônio 45+1'; Al-Hamdan (yellow card) 88' | Report | Al-Zori (yellow card) 29'; Al-Amri (yellow card) 60' | Stadium: Prince Faisal bin Fahd Stadium; Attendance: 1,491; Referee: Damir Skomina (Slovenia) |

| 22 February 2019 21 | Al-Wehda | 4–1 | Ohod | Mecca |
| 20:25 | Jebali 29'; Anselmo (yellow card) 39'; Marcos Guilherme 41', 74'; Abdu Jaber 67' | Report | Gomaa (yellow card) 35'; Attiyah (yellow card) 45'; Al-Asmari 60'; Al-Dhaw (yellow card) 90+4' | Stadium: King Abdul Aziz Stadium; Attendance: 2,001; Referee: Jochem Kamphuis (Netherlands) |

| 2 March 2019 22 | Al-Batin | 1–1 | Al-Wehda | Hafar al-Batin |
| 15:50 | Majrashi (yellow card) 36'; Nasser (yellow card) 43'; Ounalli 80'; Bangoura (yellow card) 85'; Lucas (yellow card) 90+2' | Report | Bakshween (yellow card) 41'; Al-Qarni (yellow card) 77'; Jebali 90+3' (pen.) | Stadium: Al-Batin Club Stadium; Attendance: 2,918; Referee: Pawel Raczkowski (Poland) |

| 8 March 2019 23 | Al-Hilal | 1–1 | Al-Wehda | Riyadh |
| 20:30 | Carlos Eduardo 47'; Jahfali (yellow card) 82'; Botía (yellow card) 83' | Report | Al-Nemer (yellow card) 38'; Abdu Jaber (yellow card) 73'; Assiri 77'; Bakshween (yellow card) 83'; Mebarakou (yellow card) 90'; Al-Jadaani (yellow card) 90+3' | Stadium: King Saud University Stadium; Attendance: 21,851; Referee: Damir Skomina (Slovenia) |

| 16 March 2019 24 | Al-Wehda | 0–4 | Al-Nassr | Mecca |
| 20:30 | Al-Jadaani (yellow card) 7'; Marcos Guilherme (yellow card) 79'; Al-Sqoor (yellow card) 82'; Al-Malki (yellow card) 90' | Report | Hamdallah 8' (pen.), 58', 60', 87' | Stadium: King Abdul Aziz Stadium; Attendance: 7,238; Referee: Ravshan Irmatov (Uzbekistan) |

| 28 March 2019 25 | Al-Taawoun | 1–0 | Al-Wehda | Buraidah |
| 19:00 | Renato Chaves 90+6' (o.g.) | Report | Al-Amri (yellow card) 24'; Al-Qarni (yellow card) 80'; Al-Nemer (yellow card) 90+5' | Stadium: King Abdullah Sport City Stadium; Attendance: 2,188; Referee: Szymon Marciniak (Poland) |

| 6 April 2019 26 | Al-Wehda | 3–1 | Al-Ettifaq | Mecca |
| 20:45 | Renato Chaves (yellow card) 16'; Abdu Jaber 45+3'; Jebali 69'; Amr (yellow card) 83'; Kasongo 90+3' | Report | Alemán 19'; Mahnashi (yellow card) 45+1'; Al-Aboud (yellow card) 77' | Stadium: King Abdul Aziz Stadium; Attendance: 940; Referee: Svein Oddvar Moen (Norway) |

| 12 April 2019 27 | Al-Wehda | 1–2 | Al-Faisaly | Mecca |
| 20:45 | Al-Qarni (yellow card) 39'; Otero 56' (pen.); Darwish (yellow card) 62' | Report | Khrees (yellow card) 54'; Denílson 77', 83'; Luisinho (yellow card) 90+3' | Stadium: King Abdul Aziz Stadium; Attendance: 437; Referee: Mohammed Al-Hoaish |

| 17 April 2019 28 | Al-Ahli | 3–2 | Al-Wehda | Jeddah |
| 20:45 | Al Somah 17', 47'; Abdulghani (yellow card) 38'; Stanciu 45+1'; Al-Mousa (yellow card) 52'; Al-Jassim (yellow card) 90+5' | Report | Anselmo (yellow card) 13' (yellow-red card) 81'; Otero (yellow card) 34', (goal) 71' (pen.); Kasongo 73' | Stadium: King Abdullah Sports City; Attendance: 4,983; Referee: Bakary Gassama (Gambia) |

| 11 May 2019 29 | Al-Wehda | 4–0 | Al-Qadsiah | Mecca |
| 22:30 | Al-Malki (yellow card) 34'; Marcos Guilherme 37'; Mebarakou 42'; Darwish (yellow card) 54'; Al-Amri (yellow card) 78'; Kasongo 84'; Al-Qarni 90+1' | Report | Hazazi (yellow card) 48' | Stadium: King Abdul Aziz Stadium; Attendance: 477; Referee: Shukri Al-Hanfoush |

| 16 May 2019 30 | Al-Fayha | 5–2 | Al-Wehda | Al Majma'ah |
| 22:30 | Besara 1', 44'; Asprilla 14', 30'; Al-Muziel 33'; Shafi (yellow card) 39'; Al-Khaibari (yellow card) 64' | Report | Kasongo 24'; Marcos Guilherme (yellow card) 36'; Al-Amri 90' | Stadium: King Salman Sport City Stadium; Referee: Kim Sang-woo (South Korea) |

=== King Cup ===
All times are local, AST (UTC+3).

| 3 January 2019 Round of 64 | Al-Wehda | 6–1 | Al-Nairyah | Mecca |
| 19:50 | Abdu Jaber 14', 24', 45', 54' (pen.); Al-Qathami (yellow card) 21', (goal) 30', 60' | Report | Al-Enezi 88' | Stadium: King Abdul Aziz Stadium; Referee: Majed Al-Shamrani |

| 16 January 2019 Round of 32 | Al-Orobah | 0–1 | Al-Wehda | Sakakah |
| 15:45 | Abo Shahin (yellow card) 25' | Report | Al-Qathami (yellow card) 39'; Renato Chaves 78' | Stadium: Al-Orobah Club Stadium; Referee: Shukri Al-Hanfoush |

| 23 January 2019 Round of 16 | Al-Ahli | 1–1 (a.e.t.) (1–3 p) | Al-Wehda | Jeddah |
| 20:05 | Al-Harbi (yellow card) 18'; Djaniny 40'; Abdulghani (yellow card) 55' | Report | Mebarakou (yellow card) 33'; Amr (yellow card) 61'; Renato Chaves (yellow card) 77'; Otero 85'; Bakshween (yellow card) 109' | Stadium: King Abdullah Sports City; Referee: Milorad Mažić (Serbia) |
| | Penalties |
| | Djaniny (penalty scored); Al-Mousa (penalty missed); Abdulghani (penalty missed); Díaz (penalty missed) | | Marcos Guilherme (penalty missed); Darwish (penalty scored); Renato Chaves (penalty scored); Otero (penalty scored) |

| 2 April 2019 Quarter-finals | Al-Taawoun | 3–0 | Al-Wehda | Buraidah |
| 19:00 | Al-Mousa (yellow card) 45+2'; Tawamba 58'; Sandro Manoel 60'; Adam 64' | Report | Renato Chaves (yellow card) 44'; Bakshween (yellow card) 66'; Otero (yellow card) 89' | Stadium: King Abdullah Sport City Stadium; Referee: Bakary Gassama (Gambia) |

== Statistics ==
=== Squad statistics ===
As of 16 May 2019.

| No. | Pos | Nat | Player | Total | | Pro League | | King Cup | |
| No. | Pos | Nat | Player | Apps | Goals | Apps | Goals | Apps | Goals |
|---|---|---|---|---|---|---|---|---|---|
| 1 | GK | (Egypt) | Mohamed Awad | 30 | 0 | 27 | 0 | 3 | 0 |
| 2 | DF | (Saudi Arabia) | Radhi Al-Otaibi | 0 | 0 | 0 | 0 | 0 | 0 |
| 4 | MF | (Saudi Arabia) | Waleed Bakshween | 26 | 0 | 19+3 | 0 | 4 | 0 |
| 5 | MF | (Turkey) | Emre Çolak | 15 | 1 | 11+3 | 1 | 0+1 | 0 |
| 6 | DF | (Brazil) | Renato Chaves | 32 | 3 | 28 | 2 | 4 | 1 |
| 7 | MF | (Saudi Arabia) | Mohammed Al-Qathami | 5 | 2 | 0+3 | 0 | 2 | 2 |
| 8 | MF | (Saudi Arabia) | Abdulellah Al-Malki | 19 | 0 | 11+6 | 0 | 1+1 | 0 |
| 10 | MF | (Venezuela) | Rómulo Otero | 28 | 6 | 21+4 | 5 | 3 | 1 |
| 11 | MF | (Brazil) | Marcos Guilherme | 32 | 9 | 29 | 9 | 3 | 0 |
| 12 | DF | (Saudi Arabia) | Abdullah Al-Zori | 25 | 1 | 22 | 1 | 3 | 0 |
| 13 | GK | (Saudi Arabia) | Abdulquddus Atiah | 0 | 0 | 0 | 0 | 0 | 0 |
| 15 | MF | (Saudi Arabia) | Saleh Al-Amri | 24 | 0 | 4+16 | 0 | 2+2 | 0 |
| 16 | MF | (Saudi Arabia) | Ali Al-Nemer | 25 | 0 | 16+9 | 0 | 0 | 0 |
| 19 | FW | (Democratic Republic of the Congo) | Kabongo Kasongo | 13 | 4 | 3+7 | 4 | 2+1 | 0 |
| 20 | FW | (Saudi Arabia) | Jaber Asiri | 3 | 1 | 0+2 | 1 | 0+1 | 0 |
| 21 | DF | (Saudi Arabia) | Ahmed Al-Shamrani | 2 | 0 | 1 | 0 | 1 | 0 |
| 23 | DF | (Saudi Arabia) | Abdulelah Al-Amri | 12 | 1 | 11+1 | 1 | 0 | 0 |
| 25 | DF | (Saudi Arabia) | Faisel Darwish | 21 | 0 | 15+3 | 0 | 2+1 | 0 |
| 26 | MF | (Saudi Arabia) | Mohammed Al-Sufyani | 0 | 0 | 0 | 0 | 0 | 0 |
| 27 | DF | (Saudi Arabia) | Fawaz Al-Sqoor | 21 | 1 | 17+1 | 1 | 2+1 | 0 |
| 28 | DF | (Saudi Arabia) | Abdullah Al-Shammari | 0 | 0 | 0 | 0 | 0 | 0 |
| 29 | MF | (Saudi Arabia) | Nawaf Al-Harthi | 3 | 0 | 0+2 | 0 | 0+1 | 0 |
| 31 | DF | (Saudi Arabia) | Sari Amr | 12 | 0 | 7+2 | 0 | 3 | 0 |
| 33 | GK | (Saudi Arabia) | Abdullah Al-Jadaani | 5 | 0 | 3+1 | 0 | 1 | 0 |
| 66 | MF | (Saudi Arabia) | Mohammed Al-Qarni | 9 | 1 | 6+2 | 1 | 1 | 0 |
| 71 | FW | (Eritrea) | Ahmed Abdu Jaber | 29 | 11 | 15+10 | 7 | 1+3 | 4 |
| 77 | MF | (Tunisia) | Issam Jebali | 14 | 3 | 9+4 | 3 | 1 | 0 |
| 87 | MF | (Brazil) | Anselmo | 22 | 0 | 17+3 | 0 | 2 | 0 |
| 92 | DF | (Algeria) | Zidane Mebarakou | 13 | 1 | 11 | 1 | 2 | 0 |
Players who left during the season
| 3 | DF | (Saudi Arabia) | Osama Hawsawi | 12 | 0 | 12 | 0 | 0 | 0 |
| 9 | FW | (Brazil) | Fernandão | 13 | 2 | 9+4 | 2 | 0 | 0 |
| 17 | MF | (Saudi Arabia) | Taisir Al-Jassim | 9 | 1 | 6+2 | 1 | 1 | 0 |
| 24 | MF | (Saudi Arabia) | Issam Al-Qarni | 0 | 0 | 0 | 0 | 0 | 0 |

=== Goalscorers ===
| Rank | No. | Pos | Nat | Name | Pro League | King Cup | Total |
|---|---|---|---|---|---|---|---|
| 1 | 71 | FW | (Eritrea) | Ahmed Abdu Jaber | 7 | 4 | 11 |
| 2 | 11 | MF | (Brazil) | Marcos Guilherme | 9 | 0 | 9 |
| 3 | 10 | MF | (Venezuela) | Rómulo Otero | 5 | 1 | 6 |
| 4 | 19 | FW | (Democratic Republic of the Congo) | Kabongo Kasongo | 4 | 0 | 4 |
| 5 | 6 | DF | (Brazil) | Renato Chaves | 2 | 1 | 3 |
| 5 | 77 | MF | (Tunisia) | Issam Jebali | 3 | 0 | 3 |
| 7 | 7 | MF | (Saudi Arabia) | Mohammed Al-Qathami | 0 | 2 | 2 |
| 7 | 9 | FW | (Brazil) | Fernandão | 2 | 0 | 2 |
| 9 | 5 | MF | (Turkey) | Emre Çolak | 1 | 0 | 1 |
| 9 | 12 | DF | (Saudi Arabia) | Abdullah Al-Zori | 1 | 0 | 1 |
| 9 | 17 | MF | (Saudi Arabia) | Taisir Al-Jassim | 1 | 0 | 1 |
| 9 | 20 | FW | (Saudi Arabia) | Jaber Asiri | 1 | 0 | 1 |
| 9 | 23 | DF | (Saudi Arabia) | Abdulelah Al-Amri | 1 | 0 | 1 |
| 9 | 27 | DF | (Saudi Arabia) | Fawaz Al-Sqoor | 1 | 0 | 1 |
| 9 | 66 | MF | (Saudi Arabia) | Mohammed Al-Qarni | 1 | 0 | 1 |
| 9 | 92 | DF | (Algeria) | Zidane Mebarakou | 1 | 0 | 1 |
| Own goal | | | | | 1 | 0 | 1 |
| Total | | | | | 41 | 8 | 49 |

Last Updated: 16 May 2019

=== Assists ===
| Rank | No. | Pos | Nat | Name | Pro League | King Cup | Total |
|---|---|---|---|---|---|---|---|
| 1 | 10 | MF | (Venezuela) | Rómulo Otero | 7 | 1 | 8 |
| 2 | 15 | MF | (Saudi Arabia) | Saleh Al-Amri | 3 | 1 | 4 |
| 3 | 27 | DF | (Saudi Arabia) | Fawaz Al-Sqoor | 3 | 0 | 3 |
| 4 | 4 | MF | (Saudi Arabia) | Waleed Bakshween | 2 | 0 | 2 |
| 4 | 11 | MF | (Brazil) | Marcos Guilherme | 2 | 0 | 2 |
| 4 | 16 | MF | (Saudi Arabia) | Ali Al-Nemer | 2 | 0 | 2 |
| 4 | 19 | FW | (Democratic Republic of the Congo) | Kabongo Kasongo | 2 | 0 | 2 |
| 4 | 25 | DF | (Saudi Arabia) | Faisel Darwish | 1 | 1 | 2 |
| 4 | 77 | MF | (Tunisia) | Issam Jebali | 2 | 0 | 2 |
| 4 | 87 | MF | (Brazil) | Anselmo | 2 | 0 | 2 |
| 11 | 5 | MF | (Turkey) | Emre Çolak | 0 | 1 | 1 |
| 11 | 6 | DF | (Brazil) | Renato Chaves | 1 | 0 | 1 |
| 11 | 8 | MF | (Saudi Arabia) | Abdulellah Al-Malki | 0 | 1 | 1 |
| 11 | 31 | DF | (Saudi Arabia) | Sari Amr | 1 | 0 | 2 |
| 11 | 71 | FW | (Eritrea) | Ahmed Abdu Jaber | 1 | 0 | 1 |
| Total | | | | | 29 | 5 | 34 |

Last Updated: 16 May 2019

=== Clean sheets ===
| Rank | No. | Pos | Nat | Name | Pro League | King Cup | Total |
|---|---|---|---|---|---|---|---|
| 1 | 1 | GK | (Egypt) | Mohamed Awad | 6 | 1 | 7 |
| Total | | | | | 6 | 1 | 7 |

Last Updated: 11 May 2019
