= 2017–18 Al-Wehda Club season =

Al-Wehda
2017–18 season
- President: Mohammed Tayeb
- Manager: Djamel Belkacem
- Stadium: King Abdul Aziz Stadium
- MS League: 1st (Champions, Promoted)
- King Cup: Round of 32 (knocked out by Al-Nojoom)
- Top goalscorer: League: Mousa Madkhali; Mohammed Al-Qathami (11); All: Mousa Madkhali; Mohammed Al-Qathami (11)
Home colours	Away colours
- All statistics correct as of 18 April 2018.

The 2017–18 season was Al-Wehda's first season back in Prince Mohammad bin Salman League following their relegation last season and their 73rd year in existence. Along with the Prince Mohammad bin Salman League, the club also competed in the King Cup. The season covered the period from 1 July 2017 to 30 June 2018.

== Players ==
=== Squad information ===
As of 3 January 2018

Note: Flags indicate national team as defined under FIFA eligibility rules; some limited exceptions apply. Players may hold more than one non-FIFA nationality.

No.	Pos.	Nation	Player
1	GK	KSA	Abdullah Al Arraf
2	DF	KSA	Basel Al-Mutairi
4	DF	KSA	Ahmed Al-Shamrani
6	MF	KSA	Abdullah Al Muwallad
7	MF	KSA	Mohammed Al-Qathami
8	MF	KSA	Abdulellah Al-Malki
10	MF	KSA	Bader Al-Shahrani
11	FW	KSA	Farid Al-Harbi
12	MF	KSA	Majed Al-Deeni
13	DF	KSA	Amer Haroon
15	FW	KSA	Mousa Madkhali
17	DF	KSA	Mahmoud Muaaz
18	MF	KSA	Abdulrahman Al-Sherif
20	FW	KSA	Jaber Asiri
22	DF	KSA	Kamel Al-Mor

No.	Pos.	Nation	Player
24	MF	KSA	Issam Al-Qarni
27	MF	KSA	Al Baraa Ba Adheem
30	DF	KSA	Bandar Baajaj
31	DF	KSA	Sari Amr
33	GK	KSA	Abdullah Al-Jadaani
36	MF	KSA	Muhannad Al-Faresi
50	DF	KSA	Sultan Tankar
55	GK	KSA	Mohaya Al-Sulami
70	DF	KSA	Waleed Mahboob (Captain)
71	MF	KSA	Nawaf Al-Harthi
80	DF	KSA	Sultan Al-Dossari
88	MF	KSA	Mohammed Sufyani
89	DF	KSA	Fahad Al-Johani
91	GK	KSA	Ahmed Al-Ghamdi

== Transfers ==
=== In ===
Date	Pos.	Name	Previous club	Fee	Source
18 June 2017	DF	(Bahrain) Abo Baker Adam	(Saudi Arabia) Al-Orobah	Free	
21 June 2017	DF	(Saudi Arabia) Fahad Al-Johani	(Saudi Arabia) Al-Orobah	Free	
4 July 2017	DF	(Saudi Arabia) Mahmoud Muaaz	(Saudi Arabia) Al-Taawoun	Free	
18 July 2017	DF	(Saudi Arabia) Sari Amr	(Saudi Arabia) Al-Shabab	Free	
23 July 2017	MF	(Saudi Arabia) Al Baraa Ba Adheem	(Saudi Arabia) Al-Orobah	Free	
24 July 2017	DF	(Saudi Arabia) Sami Bashir	(Saudi Arabia) Najran	Free	
24 July 2017	GK	(Saudi Arabia) Abdullah Al-Jadaani	(Saudi Arabia) Ohod	Free	
30 July 2017	DF	(Saudi Arabia) Ahmed Al-Shamrani	(Saudi Arabia) Al-Ittihad	Free	
25 August 2017	FW	(Eritrea) Ahmed Abdu Jaber	(Saudi Arabia) Hajer	Free	

=== Out ===
Date	Pos.	Name	New club	Fee	Source
8 May 2017	DF	(Saudi Arabia) Yahya Al-Musalem	(Saudi Arabia) Al-Raed	Free	
3 June 2017	FW	(Saudi Arabia) Mukhtar Fallatah	(Saudi Arabia) Al-Hilal	Free	
10 June 2017	DF	(Saudi Arabia) Hatem Belal	(Saudi Arabia) Al-Fayha	Free	
22 June 2017	MF	(Saudi Arabia) Mansor Al-Najar	(Saudi Arabia) Al-Qadsiah	Undisclosed	
15 July 2017	MF	(Uruguay) Adolfo Lima	(Uruguay) Liverpool	Free	
5 August 2017	DF	(Saudi Arabia) Yahya Kabi	(Saudi Arabia) Al-Shoulla	Free	
26 August 2017	DF	(Saudi Arabia) Abdurahman Al-Saeed	(Saudi Arabia) Al-Hazm	Free	
27 September 2017	MF	(Saudi Arabia) Mohammed Al-Qasmah	(Saudi Arabia) Al-Badaya	Free	
16 October 2017	GK	(Saudi Arabia) Imad Al-Dossari	(Saudi Arabia) Al-Washm	Free	
26 December 2017	FW	(Eritrea) Ahmed Abdu Jaber	(Saudi Arabia) Al-Tai	Free	

== Pre-season friendlies ==
17 August 2017 Friendly	Al-Wehda (Saudi Arabia)	4–1	(Egypt) Aviation Club	Cairo, Egypt
	Ba Adheem; Assiri; Madkhali,	Report

20 August 2017 Friendly	Al-Wehda (Saudi Arabia)	0–0	(Egypt) El Gouna	Cairo, Egypt
		Report

24 August 2017 Friendly	Al-Wehda (Saudi Arabia)	0–1	(Egypt) El-Entag El-Harby	Cairo, Egypt
		Report	El Fil

5 October 2017 Friendly	Al-Wehda (Saudi Arabia)	5–0	(Saudi Arabia) Al-Hejaz	Mecca, Saudi Arabia
19:00 AST	Madkhali; Al-Qathami; Al-Harbi, Bilal (o.g.)	Report		Stadium: Reserve Stadium in King Abdulaziz Stadium

== Competitions ==
=== Prince Mohammad bin Salman League ===
==== League table ====
Pos	Team	Pld	W	D	L	GF	GA	GD	Pts	Promotion, qualification or relegation
1	Al-Wehda (C, P)	30	17	7	6	49	32	+17	58	Promotion to Professional League
2	Al-Hazem (P)	30	15	8	7	50	32	+18	53	Promotion to Professional League
3	Al-Tai	30	15	7	8	52	35	+17	52	Qualification to promotion play-offs
4	Al-Kawkab	30	14	8	8	52	33	+19	50 (Note: Al-Kawkab finished ahead of Hajer on head-to-head points: Al-Kawkab 2–0 Hajer, Hajer 2–2 Al-Kawkab)	Qualification to promotion play-offs
5	Hajer	30	14	8	8	39	35	+4	50	
6	Al-Shoulla	30	11	10	9	42	43	−1	43	
7	Al-Khaleej	30	10	11	9	45	40	+5	41	
8	Al-Qaisumah	30	11	7	12	52	54	−2	40	
9	Damac	30	10	9	11	49	43	+6	39	
10	Al-Orobah	30	9	11	10	36	39	−3	38	
11	Al-Nahda	30	9	8	13	35	50	−15	35	
12	Al-Nojoom	30	6	15	9	34	41	−7	33 (Note: Head-to-head points: Al-Nojoom 8 pts; Al-Mujazzal 4 pts and –1 GD; Najran 4 pts and –2 GD (Al-Nojoom 2–1 Al-Mujazzal, Al-Mujazzal 0–0 Al-Nojoom, Al-Nojoom 2–0 Najran, Najran 1–1 Al-Nojoom, Najran 1–2 Al-Mujazzal, Al-Mujazzal 1–2 Najran).)	
13	Al-Mujazzal	30	10	3	17	39	52	−13	33	
14	Najran (O)	30	9	6	15	39	51	−12	33	Qualification to Relegation play-offs
15	Al-Watani (R)	30	5	12	13	33	48	−15	27	Qualification to Relegation play-offs
16	Jeddah (O)	30	5	10	15	43	61	−18	25	Qualification to Relegation play-offs

Updated to match(es) played on 18 April 2018. Source: kooora.com
Rules for classification: 1) Points; 2) Head-to-head points; 3) Head-to-head goal difference; 4) Total goal difference; 5) Total goals scored; 6) Play-off (only for deciding champion, promotion and relegation).
(C) Champions; (O) Play-off winners; (P) Promoted; (R) Relegated

==== Results summary ====
Overall								Home						Away					
Pld	W	D	L	GF	GA	GD	Pts	W	D	L	GF	GA	GD	W	D	L	GF	GA	GD
30	17	7	6	49	32	+17	58	10	3	2	27	13	+14	7	4	4	22	19	+3

Last updated: 18 April 2018.

==== Results by matchday ====
Matchday	1	2	3	4	5	6	7	8	9	10	11	12	13	14	15	16	17	18	19	20	21	22	23	24	25	26	27	28	29	30
Ground	H	A	H	A	H	A	H	A	H	A	H	A	H	H	A	A	H	A	H	A	H	A	H	A	H	A	H	A	A	H
Result	D	W	D	W	W	L	W	L	W	W	W	D	W	W	D	W	W	W	L	W	W	L	L	L	W	W	D	D	D	W
Position	4	1	4	6	3	6	5	7	4	2	2	1	1	1	1	1	1	1	1	1	1	1	1	2	1	1	1	1	1	1

Updated to match(es) played on 18 April 2018. Source:
A = Away; H = Home; W = Win; D = Draw; L = Loss

==== Matches ====
All times are local, AST (UTC+3).

Win Draw Loss Postponed

12 September 2017 1	Al-Wehda	2–2	Jeddah	Mecca
19:10	Al-Qathami 8', 19', (red card) 82'	Report	Al-Jubairi 60'; Alwan 68'	Stadium: King Abdul Aziz Stadium; Referee: Hizam Al-Amri

20 September 2017 2	Al-Tai	1–2	Al-Wehda	Ha'il
15:55	Al-Shammeri (red card) 88'; Al-Enezi 90+1'	Report	Assiri 45+1', 79'; Al-Harbi (red card) 88'	Stadium: Prince Abdul Aziz bin Musa'ed Stadium; Referee: Mishari Al-Mishari

26 September 2017 3	Al-Wehda	0–0	Al-Kawkab	Mecca
18:55		Report		Stadium: King Abdul Aziz Stadium; Referee: Mishari Al-Assiri

10 October 2017 5	Al-Wehda	3–1	Damac	Mecca
18:40	Amr 12'; Madkhali 49'; Al-Qarni 87'	Report	Suanon 42'	Stadium: King Abdul Aziz Stadium; Referee: Abdulsamad Bakri

17 October 2017 6	Al-Watani	1–0	Al-Wehda	Tabuk
15:55	Al-Balawi 71'	Report		Stadium: King Khalid Sport City Stadium; Referee: Abdullah Dhafer

24 October 2017 7	Al-Wehda	2–1	Al-Hazem	Mecca
18:55	Madkhali 44', 60'	Report	Al-Zaaq 83', (red card) 88'	Stadium: King Abdul Aziz Stadium; Referee: Raed Al-Zahrani

7 November 2017 9	Al-Wehda	1–0	Al-Orobah	Mecca
18:25	Haroon 19'	Report		Stadium: King Abdul Aziz Stadium; Referee: Mohammed Al-Beredi

14 November 2017 10	Al-Nahda	1–3	Al-Wehda	Dammam
17:30	Aoudou 84'	Report	Al-Faresi 60'; Madkhali 71'; Al-Qarni 79'	Stadium: Prince Fahd bin Salman Stadium; Referee: Shukri Al-Hanfosh

21 November 2017 11	Al-Wehda	2–0	Al-Shoulla	Mecca
18:20	Ba Ajaj 87'; Assiri 90+3'	Report		Stadium: King Abdul Aziz Stadium; Referee: Sami Al-Jires

28 November 2017 12	Hajer	0–0	Al-Wehda	Al-Hasa
17:30		Report		Stadium: Prince Abdullah bin Jalawi Stadium; Referee: Khaled Al-Teris

5 December 2017 13	Al-Wehda	3–2	Najran	Mecca
18:20	Al-Qathami 14'; Mahboob 36' (pen.); Assiri 90+3'	Report	Al-Robeai 51' (pen.); Al Abbas 58'	Stadium: King Abdul Aziz Stadium; Referee: Shukri Al-Hanfosh

12 December 2017 14	Al-Wehda	2–0	Al-Mujazzal	Mecca
18:20	Assiri 5'; Al-Qathami 17'	Report	Morotó (red card) 1'	Stadium: King Abdul Aziz Stadium; Referee: Khaled Al-Teris

19 December 2017 15	Al-Khaleej	1–1	Al-Wehda	Saihat
17:35	Al-Khateeb 81'	Report	Al-Faresi 78'	Stadium: Prince Nayef bin Abdulaziz Stadium; Referee: Mohammed Al-Smail

24 December 2017 4	Al-Nojoom	0–1	Al-Wehda	Al-Hasa
15:00		Report	Al-Qathami 60'	Stadium: Prince Abdullah bin Jalawi Stadium; Referee: Ahmed Al-Rumaikhani

29 December 2017 8	Al-Qaisumah	4–3	Al-Wehda	Hafar al-Batin
15:10	Demba 50'; Majrashi 67', 69'; Al-Sahali 90+3'	Report	Al-Mor 11'; Al-Faresi 38'; Madkhali 81'	Stadium: Al-Batin Club Stadium; Referee: Ahmed Al-Rumaikhani

11 January 2018 16	Jeddah	2–3	Al-Wehda	Jeddah
18:40	Mesawi 16'; Abker 90+2'	Report	Al-Faresi 44'; Madkhali 52', 83'	Stadium: Reserve Stadium in King Abdullah Sports City; Referee: Majed Al-Shamrani

17 January 2018 17	Al-Wehda	2–0	Al-Tai	Mecca
18:40	Al-Qathami 12'; Al-Harbi 90+3'	Report		Stadium: King Abdul Aziz Stadium; Referee: Mohammed Al-Hoaish

23 January 2018 18	Al-Kawkab	0–1	Al-Wehda	Al-Kharj
15:30		Report	Madkhali 45+1' (pen.)	Stadium: Al-Shoulla Club Stadium; Referee: Shukri Al-Hanfosh

31 January 2018 19	Al-Wehda	1–2	Al-Nojoom	Mecca
17:25	Madkhali 41'; Al-Johani (red card) 46'	Report	Al-Harbi 4' (pen.); Al-Mohanna 15'	Stadium: King Abdul Aziz Stadium; Referee: Fahad Al-Mirdasi

6 February 2018 20	Damac	0–2	Al-Wehda	Khamis Mushait
16:00		Report	Al-Qathami 36'; Madkhali 61'	Stadium: Damac Club Stadium; Referee: Turki Al-Khudair

13 February 2018 21	Al-Wehda	2–1	Al-Watani	Mecca
19:00	Al-Malki 40'; Madkhali 43' (pen.)	Report	Al-Shamrani 16' (o.g.)	Stadium: King Abdul Aziz Stadium; Referee: Turki Al-Khudair

20 February 2018 22	Al-Hazem	2–0	Al-Wehda	Ar Rass
16:00	Pato 20', 64'	Report		Stadium: Al Hazm Club Stadium; Referee: Khaled Al-Teris

7 March 2018 24	Al-Orobah	3–1	Al-Wehda	Sakakah
16:10	Al-Soudani 17'; Al-Shameri 38'; Abo Shahin 50'	Report	Al-Qathami 24'	Stadium: Al-Oruba Club Stadium; Referee: Abdullah Al-Nuhait

13 March 2018 25	Al-Wehda	3–0	Al-Nahda	Mecca
19:10	Al-Malki 7'; Al-Qathami 57' (pen.); Assiri 87'	Report		Stadium: King Abdul Aziz Stadium; Referee: Sultan Al-Harbi

17 March 2018 23	Al-Wehda	2–3	Al-Qaisumah	Mecca
16:20	Al-Harbi 53'; Al-Johani 56'	Report	Afana 22' (pen.), 57'; Al-Shammari 59'	Stadium: King Abdul Aziz Stadium; Referee: Shukri Al-Hanfoush

21 March 2018 26	Al-Shoulla	1–2	Al-Wehda	Al-Kharj
15:50	Al-Menqash 17'; Al-Munaif (red card) 85'	Report	Al-Malki 19'; Ba Adheem 52'	Stadium: Al-Shoulla Club Stadium; Referee: Sultan Al-Harbi

27 March 2018 27	Al-Wehda	1–1	Hajer	Makkah
19:15	Al-Malki 19'	Report	Al-Huraib 70'	Stadium: King Abdul Aziz Stadium; Referee: Abdulrahman Al-Sultan

3 April 2018 28	Najran	1–1	Al-Wehda	Abha
16:00	Al Abbas 40' (pen.)	Report	Al-Qathami 57'	Stadium: Prince Sultan bin Abdul Aziz Stadium; Referee: Majed Al-Shamrani

11 April 2018 29	Al-Mujazzal	2–2	Al-Wehda	Al Majma'ah
20:45	Sidevaldo 26'; Al-Rashod 30'	Report	Al-Malki 6'; Al-Harbi 35'	Stadium: King Salman Sport City Stadium; Referee: Sultan Al-Okairi

18 April 2018 30	Al-Wehda	1–0	Al-Khaleej	Makkah
20:45	Al-Qathami 44'	Report		Stadium: King Abdul Aziz Stadium; Referee: Khaled Al-Teris

=== King Cup ===
Al-Wehda entered the King Cup in the Round of 32. They were eliminated in the first round after losing to Al-Nojoom. All times are local, AST (UTC+3).

3 January 2018 Round of 32	Al-Wehda	0–2 (a.e.t.)	Al-Nojoom	Mecca
19:45	Al-Sulami (yellow card) 115'	Report	Awadh (yellow card) 62'; Al-Harbi 96' (pen.); Sharoumah (yellow card) 111'; Al-Majhad 113'	Stadium: King Abdul Aziz Stadium; Referee: Abdullah Al-Awidan

== Statistics ==
=== Squad statistics ===
As of 18 April 2018.

No.	Pos	Nat	Player	Total		Prince Mohammad bin Salman League		King Cup	
No.	Pos	Nat	Player	Apps	Goals	Apps	Goals	Apps	Goals
2	DF	(Saudi Arabia)	Basel Al-Mutairi	0	0	0	0	0	0
4	DF	(Saudi Arabia)	Ahmed Al-Shamrani	18	0	12+6	0	0	0
6	MF	(Saudi Arabia)	Abdullah Al Muwallad	1	0	1	0	0	0
7	MF	(Saudi Arabia)	Mohammed Al-Qathami	29	11	27+2	11	0	0
8	MF	(Saudi Arabia)	Abdulellah Al-Malki	26	5	26	5	0	0
10	MF	(Saudi Arabia)	Bader Al-Shahrani	9	0	4+5	0	0	0
11	FW	(Saudi Arabia)	Farid Al-Harbi	24	3	7+17	3	0	0
12	MF	(Saudi Arabia)	Majed Al-Deeni	14	0	8+5	0	1	0
13	DF	(Saudi Arabia)	Amer Haroon	14	1	14	1	0	0
14	DF	(Saudi Arabia)	Moayed Ghrowi	1	0	0	0	1	0
15	FW	(Saudi Arabia)	Mousa Madkhali	26	11	20+6	11	0	0
17	DF	(Saudi Arabia)	Mahmoud Muaaz	15	0	9+6	0	0	0
18	MF	(Saudi Arabia)	Abdulrahman Al-Sherif	0	0	0	0	0	0
20	FW	(Saudi Arabia)	Jaber Asiri	23	6	10+13	6	0	0
22	DF	(Saudi Arabia)	Kamel Al-Mor	22	1	17+5	1	0	0
23	DF	(Saudi Arabia)	Radhi Al-Otaibi	1	0	0	0	0+1	0
24	MF	(Saudi Arabia)	Issam Al-Qarni	26	2	19+7	2	0	0
26	DF	(Saudi Arabia)	Muaaz Al-Zanbaqi	1	0	0	0	1	0
27	MF	(Saudi Arabia)	Al Baraa Ba Adheem	21	1	10+11	1	0	0
30	DF	(Saudi Arabia)	Bandar Baajaj	13	1	9+4	1	0	0
31	DF	(Saudi Arabia)	Sari Amr	27	1	27	1	0	0
33	GK	(Saudi Arabia)	Abdullah Al-Jadaani	28	0	28	0	0	0
36	MF	(Saudi Arabia)	Muhannad Al-Faresi	23	4	12+11	4	0	0
50	DF	(Saudi Arabia)	Sultan Tankar	1	0	0	0	1	0
55	GK	(Saudi Arabia)	Mohaya Al-Sulami	2	0	1	0	1	0
70	DF	(Saudi Arabia)	Waleed Mahboob	27	1	25+2	1	0	0
71	MF	(Saudi Arabia)	Nawaf Al-Harthi	4	0	1+2	0	1	0
80	DF	(Saudi Arabia)	Sultan Al-Dossari	24	0	19+5	0	0	0
88	MF	(Saudi Arabia)	Mohammed Sufyani	1	0	0+1	0	0	0
89	DF	(Saudi Arabia)	Fahad Al-Johani	23	1	23	1	0	0
91	GK	(Saudi Arabia)	Ahmed Al-Ghamdi	1	0	1	0	0	0
92	DF	(Saudi Arabia)	Abdulrahman Al-Harbi	1	0	0	0	1	0
93	MF	(Saudi Arabia)	Fawaz Al-Sulami	1	0	0	0	1	0
94	FW	(Saudi Arabia)	Hani Majrashi	1	0	0	0	0+1	0
95	MF	(Saudi Arabia)	Ammar Anwar	1	0	0	0	1	0
96	MF	(Saudi Arabia)	Loay Hawsawi	1	0	0	0	1	0
97	MF	(Saudi Arabia)	Abdulaziz Al-Sahali	1	0	0	0	0+1	0
98	MF	(Saudi Arabia)	Ali Al-Qalqamy	1	0	0	0	1	0
99	MF	(Saudi Arabia)	Radhi Al-Harbi	1	0	0	0	0+1	0

=== Goalscorers ===
Rank	No.	Pos	Nat	Name	Prince Mohammad bin Salman League	King Cup	Total
1	7	MF	(Saudi Arabia)	Mohammed Al-Qathami	11	0	11
1	15	FW	(Saudi Arabia)	Mousa Madkhali	11	0	11
3	20	FW	(Saudi Arabia)	Jaber Asiri	6	0	6
4	8	MF	(Saudi Arabia)	Abdulellah Al-Malki	5	0	5
5	36	MF	(Saudi Arabia)	Muhannad Al-Faresi	4	0	4
6	11	FW	(Saudi Arabia)	Farid Al-Harbi	3	0	3
7	24	MF	(Saudi Arabia)	Issam Al-Qarni	2	0	2
8	13	DF	(Saudi Arabia)	Amer Haroon	1	0	1
8	22	DF	(Saudi Arabia)	Kamel Al-Mor	1	0	1
8	27	MF	(Saudi Arabia)	Al Baraa Ba Adheem	1	0	1
8	30	DF	(Saudi Arabia)	Bandar Baajaj	1	0	1
8	31	DF	(Saudi Arabia)	Sari Amr	1	0	1
8	70	DF	(Saudi Arabia)	Waleed Mahboob	1	0	1
8	89	DF	(Saudi Arabia)	Fahad Al-Johani	1	0	1
Own goal					0	0	0
Total					49	0	49

Last Updated: 18 April 2018

=== Clean sheets ===
Rank	No.	Pos	Nat	Name	Prince Mohammad bin Salman League	King Cup	Total
1	33	GK	(Saudi Arabia)	Abdullah Al-Jadaani	11	0	11
Total					11	0	11

Last Updated: 18 April 2018
