= 2019–20 Al-Wehda Club season =

Al-Wehda
2019–20 season
- President: Sultan Azhar
- Manager: Mario Cvitanović (until 16 September 2019); José Daniel Carreño (from 16 September until 19 August 2020); Essa Al-Mehyani (from 19 August 2020)
- Stadium: King Abdul Aziz Stadium
- SPL: 4th
- King Cup: Quarter-finals
- Top goalscorer: League: Youssouf Niakaté (16); All: Youssouf Niakaté (18)
- Highest home attendance: 10,807 vs Al-Ahli (14 February 2020)
- Lowest home attendance: 1,146 vs Abha (30 August 2019)
- Average home league attendance: 7,242
Home colours	Away colours	Third colours
- All statistics correct as of 9 September 2020.

The 2019–20 season was Al-Wehda's 36th non-consecutive season in the top flight of Saudi football and 75th year in existence as a football club. The club participated in the Pro League and the King Cup.

The season covered the period from 1 July 2019 to 9 September 2020.

== Players ==
=== Squad information ===
As of 1 February 2020

Note: Flags indicate national team as defined under FIFA eligibility rules; some limited exceptions apply. Players may hold more than one non-FIFA nationality.

No.	Pos.	Nation	Player
1	GK	KSA	Raghid Al-Najjar
2	DF	KSA	Radhi Al-Otaibi
4	MF	KSA	Waleed Bakshween
6	DF	BRA	Renato Chaves
7	MF	KSA	Mishari Al-Qahtani
8	MF	KSA	Mohammed Al-Qarni
9	MF	AUS	Craig Goodwin
12	DF	KSA	Abdulrahman Al-Rio
13	GK	KSA	Abdulquddus Atiah
14	DF	ESP	Alberto Botía
15	MF	KSA	Jaber Mustafa
16	MF	KSA	Ali Al-Nemer
17	DF	KSA	Ali Al-Zubaidi (on loan from Al-Ahli)
18	FW	FRA	Youssouf Niakaté
19	FW	KSA	Thamer Al-Ali
20	FW	KSA	Jaber Asiri
21	DF	KSA	Yassin Hamzah

No.	Pos.	Nation	Player
22	DF	KSA	Faris Abdi
23	DF	KSA	Noor Al-Rashidi
24	MF	KSA	Ayman Al-Khulaif
27	DF	KSA	Fawaz Al-Sqoor
28	DF	KSA	Hamad Al-Jayzani
29	MF	KSA	Rakan Al-Shamlan (on loan from Al-Nassr)
33	GK	KSA	Abdullah Al-Jadaani
44	MF	KSA	Hatem Belal
49	MF	KSA	Sultan Al-Sawadi
51	FW	KSA	Mousa Madkhali
55	GK	KSA	Mohaya Al-Sulami
71	FW	ERI	Ahmed Abdu Jaber
87	MF	BRA	Anselmo
88	DF	KSA	Hassan Tambakti (on loan from Al-Shabab)
91	MF	BRA	Luisinho
99	MF	BRA	Élton

=== Out on loan ===
Note: Flags indicate national team as defined under FIFA eligibility rules; some limited exceptions apply. Players may hold more than one non-FIFA nationality.

No.	Pos.	Nation	Player
29	MF	KSA	Nawaf Al-Harthi (at Al-Ain until 20 September 2020)
70	FW	KSA	Mohammed Al-Saiari (at Al-Faisaly until 9 September 2020)

No.	Pos.	Nation	Player
77	MF	KSA	Mohammed Al-Sufyani (at Jeddah until 20 September 2020)
80	MF	KSA	Khaled Ba Butain (at Jeddah until 20 September 2020)

== Transfers and loans ==
=== Transfers in ===
Entry date	Position	No.	Player	From club	Fee	Ref.
3 July 2019	GK	30	(Algeria) Moustapha Zeghba	(Algeria) ES Sétif	Undisclosed	
4 July 2019	MF	44	(Saudi Arabia) Hatem Belal	(Saudi Arabia) Al-Fayha	Free	
6 July 2019	DF	12	(Saudi Arabia) Abdulrahman Al-Rio	(Saudi Arabia) Al-Ittihad	Free	
15 July 2019	MF	24	(Saudi Arabia) Ayman Al-Khulaif	(Saudi Arabia) Al-Ahli	$535,000	
15 July 2019	MF	7	(Saudi Arabia) Mishari Al-Qahtani	(Saudi Arabia) Al-Tai	Free	
17 July 2019	MF	9	(Australia) Craig Goodwin	(Australia) Adelaide United	$450,000	
20 July 2019	FW	70	(Saudi Arabia) Mohammed Al-Saiari	(Saudi Arabia) Al-Ettifaq	$535,000	
23 July 2019	FW	18	(France) Youssouf Niakaté	(Belgium) Union SG	$2,300,000	
29 July 2019	DF	5	(Benin) Khaled Adénon	(France) Amiens	Free	
2 August 2019	DF	21	(Saudi Arabia) Yassin Hamzah	(Saudi Arabia) Al-Fateh	Free	
30 August 2019	DF	14	(Spain) Alberto Botía	(Saudi Arabia) Al-Hilal	Free	
31 August 2019	MF	15	(Saudi Arabia) Jaber Mustafa	(Saudi Arabia) Al-Ittihad	Undisclosed	
1 January 2020	MF	91	(Brazil) Luisinho	(Saudi Arabia) Al-Faisaly	Undisclosed	
8 January 2020	MF	99	(Brazil) Élton	(Brazil) CRB	Undisclosed	
10 January 2020	GK	1	(Saudi Arabia) Raghid Al-Najjar	(Saudi Arabia) Al-Faisaly	Undisclosed	
15 January 2020	FW	–	(Saudi Arabia) Thamer Al-Ali	(Saudi Arabia) Al-Mujazzal	Undisclosed	
17 January 2020	DF	–	(Saudi Arabia) Hamad Al-Jayzani	(Saudi Arabia) Damac	Undisclosed	
20 January 2020	MF	–	(Saudi Arabia) Sultan Al-Sawadi	(Saudi Arabia) Al-Raed	Free	
20 January 2020	MF	–	(Saudi Arabia) Faris Abdi	(United States) Austin Bold	Undisclosed	

=== Loans in ===
Start date	End date	Position	No.	Player	From club	Fee	Ref.
15 July 2019	End of season	DF	17	(Saudi Arabia) Ali Al-Zubaidi	(Saudi Arabia) Al-Ahli	None	
31 August 2019	End of season	DF	88	(Saudi Arabia) Hassan Tambakti	(Saudi Arabia) Al-Shabab	None	
31 August 2019	End of season	MF	29	(Saudi Arabia) Rakan Al-Shamlan	(Saudi Arabia) Al-Nassr	None	

=== Transfers out ===
Exit date	Position	No.	Player	To club	Fee	Ref.
8 June 2019	DF	21	(Saudi Arabia) Ahmed Al-Shamrani	(Saudi Arabia) Al-Hazem	Free	
2 July 2019	MF	8	(Saudi Arabia) Abdulellah Al-Malki	(Saudi Arabia) Al-Ittihad	Undisclosed	
20 July 2019	MF	15	(Saudi Arabia) Saleh Al-Amri	(Saudi Arabia) Al-Ettifaq	Free	
22 July 2019	MF	7	(Saudi Arabia) Mohammed Al-Qathami	(Saudi Arabia) Al-Batin	Free	
23 July 2019	MF	–	(Saudi Arabia) Issam Al-Qarni	(Saudi Arabia) Ohod	Free	
23 July 2019	MF	77	(Tunisia) Issam Jebali		Released	
9 August 2019	DF	28	(Saudi Arabia) Abdullah Al-Shammari	(Saudi Arabia) Al-Hazem	Undisclosed	
1 January 2020	MF	10	(Turkey) Emre Çolak	(Spain) Deportivo La Coruña	Free	
7 January 2020	MF	11	(Brazil) Marcos Guilherme		Released	
8 January 2020	GK	30	(Algeria) Moustapha Zeghba	(Saudi Arabia) Damac	Free	
10 January 2020	DF	25	(Saudi Arabia) Faisel Darwish	(Saudi Arabia) Al-Taawoun	Free	
30 January 2020	DF	3	(Saudi Arabia) Abdullah Al-Zori	(Saudi Arabia) Al-Shabab	$533,000	
30 January 2020	DF	31	(Saudi Arabia) Sari Amr	(Saudi Arabia) Abha	Free	

=== Loans out ===
Start date	End date	Position	No.	Player	To club	Fee	Ref.
15 July 2019	End of season	MF	29	(Saudi Arabia) Nawaf Al-Harthi	(Saudi Arabia) Al-Ain	None	
31 January 2020	End of season	FW	70	(Saudi Arabia) Mohammed Al-Saiari	(Saudi Arabia) Al-Wehda	None	
31 January 2020	End of season	MF	77	(Saudi Arabia) Mohammed Sufyani	(Saudi Arabia) Jeddah	None	
31 January 2020	End of season	MF	80	(Saudi Arabia) Khaled Ba Butain	(Saudi Arabia) Jeddah	None	

== Pre-season ==
17 July 2019 Friendly	Al-Wehda (Saudi Arabia)	2–0	(Hungary) ZTE	Ptuj, Slovenia
18:00 CEST	Renato Chaves 54'; Al-Khulaif 88'	Report		Stadium: Ptuj City Stadium

21 July 2019 Friendly	Al-Wehda (Saudi Arabia)	0–1	(Slovenia) Krško	Limbuš, Slovenia
18:00 CEST			Sokler	Stadium: Sport Park Limbus

24 July 2019 Friendly	Al-Wehda (Saudi Arabia)	0–2	(Romania) Cluj	Rogaška Slatina, Slovenia
18:00 CEST		Report		Stadium: Športni center Rogaška Slatina

25 July 2019 Friendly	Al-Wehda (Saudi Arabia)	3–0	(Algeria) Paradou	Maribor, Slovenia
18:00 CEST	Çolak; Goodwin			Stadium: Stadium of Limbus

3 August 2019 Friendly	Al-Wehda (Saudi Arabia)	5–1	(United Arab Emirates) Al-Ittihad Kalba	Maribor, Slovenia
18:00 CEST	Çolak; Niakaté; Anselmo; Goodwin	Report	Al-Bakhit	Stadium: Stadium of Limbus

7 August 2019 Friendly	Al-Wehda (Saudi Arabia)	2–1	(Slovenia) NK Celje	Maribor, Slovenia
18:00 CEST	Hamzah; Goodwin	Report	Štusej 82'	Stadium: Stadium of Limbus

== Competitions ==
=== Overall ===
Competition	Started round	Final position / round	First match	Last match
Pro League	—	4th	24 August 2019	9 September 2020
King Cup	Round of 64	Quarter-finals	5 November 2019	18 January 2020

Updated to match played 9 September 2020
Source: Competitions

=== Overview ===
Competition	Record							
Competition	G	W	D	L	GF	GA	GD	Win %
Pro League	30	16	1	13	45	40	+5	53.33
King Cup	4	2	1	1	4	3	+1	50.00
Total	34	18	2	14	49	43	+6	52.94

Updated to match played 9 September 2020
Source: Competitions

=== Pro League ===
==== League table ====
Pos	Team	Pld	W	D	L	GF	GA	GD	Pts	Qualification or relegation
2	Al-Nassr	30	19	7	4	60	26	+34	64	Qualification for AFC Champions League group stage
3	Al-Ahli	30	15	5	10	49	36	+13	50	Qualification for AFC Champions League group stage
4	Al-Wehda	30	16	1	13	45	40	+5	49	Qualification for AFC Champions League play-off round
5	Al-Faisaly	30	14	6	10	41	36	+5	48	
6	Al-Raed	30	13	7	10	41	50	−9	46	

Updated to match(es) played on 9 September 2020. Source: spl.com
Rules for classification: 1) Points; 2) Head-to-head points; 3) Head-to-head goal difference; 4) Total goal difference; 5) Total goals scored; 6) Fair-play points (Note: Head-to-head record is used only after all the matches between the teams in question have been played).

==== Results summary ====
Overall								Home						Away					
Pld	W	D	L	GF	GA	GD	Pts	W	D	L	GF	GA	GD	W	D	L	GF	GA	GD
30	16	1	13	45	40	+5	49	9	1	5	21	16	+5	7	0	8	24	24	0

Last updated: 9 September 2020.

==== Results by round ====
Round	1	2	3	4	5	6	7	8	9	10	11	12	13	14	15	16	17	18	19	20	21	22	23	24	25	26	27	28	29	30
Ground	H	H	A	A	H	A	H	A	A	H	H	A	H	A	H	A	A	H	H	A	H	A	H	H	A	A	H	A	H	A
Result	L	L	W	W	W	W	W	L	L	W	W	L	W	L	W	L	W	W	L	L	W	W	L	D	L	W	W	L	L	W
Position	15	14	12	8	3	2	2	3	6	5	2	4	2	6	4	5	4	4	4	4	4	3	4	4	5	4	4	4	4	4

Updated to match(es) played on 9 September 2020. Source:
A = Away; H = Home; W = Win; D = Draw; L = Loss

==== Matches ====
All times are local, AST (UTC+3).

Win Draw Loss Postponed

24 August 2019 1	Al-Wehda	0–2	Al-Ettifaq	Mecca
20:50	Amr (yellow card) 51'; Bakshween (yellow card) 80'; Al-Saiari (yellow card) 90+1'	Report	Yambéré (yellow card) 8'; Hazazi (yellow card) 35'; Al-Torais 57'; Sliti (yellow card) 67', (goal) 90+6'; Al-Kwikbi (yellow card) 90'	Stadium: King Abdul Aziz Stadium; Attendance: 2,482; Referee: Bakary Gassama (Gambia)

30 August 2019 2	Al-Wehda	1–2	Abha	Mecca
20:40	Darwish (yellow card) 30'; Botía (yellow card) 49', (goal) 65'; Goodwin (yellow card) 83'	Report	Tahrat 31'; Atouchi (yellow card) 88'; Al-Najar 90'	Stadium: King Abdul Aziz Stadium; Attendance: 1,146; Referee: Jorge Sousa (Portugal)

14 September 2019 3	Al-Ahli	1–2	Al-Wehda	Jeddah
20:35	Al-Fatil (yellow card) 42'; Al-Mogahwi (yellow card) 90+3'; Asiri (yellow card) 90+5'; Al Somah 90+6'	Report	Niakaté 8', 45+1'; Al-Khulaif (yellow card) 18'; Botía (yellow card) 26'; Al-Zori (yellow card) 49'; Goodwin (yellow card) 88'	Stadium: King Abdullah Sports City; Attendance: 12,688; Referee: Matej Jug (Slovenia)

20 September 2019 4	Al-Fayha	0–1	Al-Wehda	Al Majma'ah
18:35	Neto (yellow card) 26'; Ba Masoud (yellow card) 80'	Report	Al-Khulaif (yellow card) 22'; Anselmo (yellow card) 24'; Goodwin 78'	Stadium: Al Majma'ah Sports City; Attendance: 4,237; Referee: Richard Martens (Netherlands)

27 September 2019 5	Al-Wehda	2–0	Al-Fateh	Mecca
20:15	Niakaté 15' (pen.); Anselmo (yellow card) 90+2', (goal) 90+4'	Report	Koval (yellow card) 16'; Al-Dhaw (yellow card) 81'; Lajami (yellow card) 86'	Stadium: King Abdul Aziz Stadium; Attendance: 3,269; Referee: Siemen Mulder (Netherlands)

3 October 2019 6	Damac	0–1	Al-Wehda	Abha
18:35		Report	Niakaté 10'; Botía (yellow card) 54'; Anselmo (yellow card) 76'	Stadium: Prince Sultan bin Abdul Aziz Stadium; Attendance: 9,613; Referee: Bobby Madden (Scotland)

19 October 2019 7	Al-Wehda	1–0	Al-Ittihad	Mecca
20:00	Marcos Guilherme 33'; Anselmo (yellow card) 87'	Report	Al-Sahafi (yellow card) 60'	Stadium: King Abdul Aziz Stadium; Attendance: 10,756; Referee: Pol van Boekel (Netherlands)

24 October 2019 8	Al-Shabab	2–0	Al-Wehda	Riyadh
19:55	Sebá 64'; Al-Hamdan 79'	Report	Renato (yellow card) 19'; Abdu Jaber (yellow card) 37'; Al-Saiari (red card) 73'; Botía (yellow card) 73'; Bakshween (yellow card) 84'; Al-Shamlan (yellow card) 90+2'	Stadium: Prince Khalid bin Sultan Stadium; Attendance: 5,717; Referee: Damir Skomina (Slovenia)

1 November 2019 9	Al-Raed	3–2	Al-Wehda	Buraidah
18:00	Daoudi 42', 90+2'; Arnaud Djoum (yellow card) 45'; Al-Amri (yellow card) 78'; Al-Fahad (yellow card) 80'; Palomeque (yellow card) 89'; Al-Ghamdi 90+5', (yellow card) 90+6'	Report	Anselmo (yellow card) 23', (goal) 75'; Bakshween (yellow card) 33'; Marcos Guilherme (yellow card) 53'; Goodwin 80' (pen.); Tambakti (yellow card) 90'	Stadium: King Abdullah Sport City Stadium; Attendance: 2,161; Referee: Ovidiu Hațegan (Romania)

24 November 2019 10	Al-Wehda	1–0	Al-Nassr	Mecca
18:20	Anselmo (yellow card) 45+2', (goal) 60'; Niakaté (yellow card) 87'	Report	Hamdallah (yellow card) 43'; Petros (yellow card) 69'; Maicon (yellow card) 69'; Al-Ghanam (yellow card) 90+7'	Stadium: King Abdul Aziz Stadium; Attendance: 10,450; Referee: István Kovács (Romania)

12 December 2019 11	Al-Wehda	2–0	Al-Adalah	Mecca
19:45	Anselmo 43'; Al-Sqoor (yellow card) 45'; Renato 63', (yellow card) 83'	Report	Cissé (yellow card) 35'; Guechi (yellow card) 63'; Sharahili (yellow card) 90+4'	Stadium: King Abdul Aziz Stadium; Attendance: 4,750; Referee: Pawel Raczkowski (Poland)

19 December 2019 12	Al-Taawoun	2–1	Al-Wehda	Buraidah
17:55	Petrolina 9'; Al-Swat 65'	Report	Niakaté 37'; Al-Nemer (yellow card) 74'	Stadium: King Abdullah Sport City Stadium; Attendance: 1,545; Referee: Serdar Gözübüyük (Netherlands)

27 December 2019 13	Al-Wehda	1–0	Al-Faisaly	Mecca
19:50	Al-Qarni (yellow card) 39'; Botía (yellow card) 45'; Al-Shamlan 76', (yellow card) 90+3'; Al-Zori (yellow card) 83'; Al-Jadaani (yellow card) 90'	Report	Silva (yellow card) 49'; Al-Qahtani (yellow card) 73'	Stadium: King Abdul Aziz Stadium; Attendance: 5,411; Referee: Viktor Kassai (Hungary)

11 January 2020 14	Al-Hilal	3–1	Al-Wehda	Riyadh
20:05	Gomis 31' (pen.), 77'; Al-Shehri 70', (yellow card) 81'	Report	Anselmo 9'; Goodwin (yellow card) 61'; Niakaté (yellow card) 76'	Stadium: King Saud University Stadium; Attendance: 20,192; Referee: Ovidiu Hațegan (Romania)

24 January 2020 15	Al-Wehda	5–1	Al-Hazem	Mecca
20:10	Al-Sqoor 6'; Renato (yellow card) 26', (goal) 34'; Al-Zori (yellow card) 54'; Niakaté 60'; Anselmo 73'; Luisinho 88'	Report	Al-Ayyaf (yellow card) 33'; Al-Shammari (yellow card) 66'; Omar 77'	Stadium: King Abdul Aziz Stadium; Attendance: 10,141; Referee: Majed Al-Shamrani

30 January 2020 16	Al-Ettifaq	3–1	Al-Wehda	Dammam
18:00	Doukara 11'; Al-Hazaa 51'; Al-Torais (yellow card) 71'; Azaro (yellow card) 88'; Al-Robeai 90+3'	Report	Niakaté 7'; Anselmo (yellow card) 50'; Bakshween (yellow card) 64'	Stadium: Prince Mohamed bin Fahd Stadium; Attendance: 2,006; Referee: Tamás Bognár (Hungary)

7 February 2020 17	Abha	1–4	Al-Wehda	Abha
16:00	Al-Jadaani 44' (o.g.); Aouadhi (yellow card) 59'; Atouchi (yellow card) 87'	Report	Goodwin 14', 46'; Niakaté 25', 60'	Stadium: Prince Sultan bin Abdul Aziz Stadium; Attendance: 1,297; Referee: António Nobre (Portugal)

14 February 2020 18	Al-Wehda	2–0	Al-Ahli	Mecca
20:25	Luisinho 28'; Niakaté 82'; Botía (yellow card) 84'	Report		Stadium: King Abdul Aziz Stadium; Attendance: 10,807; Referee: Slavko Vinčić (Slovenia)

20 February 2020 19	Al-Wehda	0–2	Al-Fayha	Mecca
20:30	Tambakti (yellow card) 67'; Anselmo (yellow card) 73'	Report	Villanueva 28', 69'; Neto (yellow card) 33'; Al-Barakah (yellow card) 87'	Stadium: King Abdul Aziz Stadium; Attendance: 10,150; Referee: Turki Al-Khudhayr

29 February 2020 20	Al-Fateh	3–2	Al-Wehda	Al-Hasa
15:40	Bendebka 42', (yellow card) 90+3' te Vrede 45+4'; Aguirregaray 66'	Report	Niakaté 25'; Luisinho 34'; Al-Qarni (yellow card) 45+3'; Botía (yellow card) 63'; Al-Shamlan (yellow card) 70'	Stadium: Prince Abdullah bin Jalawi Stadium; Attendance: 12,198; Referee: Khaled Al-Teris

6 March 2020 21	Al-Wehda	3–2	Damac	Mecca
19:05	Bakshween (yellow card) 55'; Niakaté 59'; Anselmo 65', (yellow card) 83'; Luisinho 80'	Report	Al-Jouei 34'; Al-Shahrani (yellow card) 55'; Vittor (yellow card) 59'; Zelaya 90+4'	Stadium: King Abdul Aziz Stadium; Attendance: 10,303; Referee: Faisal Al-Blwi

11 March 2020 22	Al-Ittihad	1–2	Al-Wehda	Jeddah
20:45	Romarinho 14'; Abdulhamid (yellow card) 18'; Badri (yellow card) 60'; Al-Aboud (yellow card) 74'; Gil (yellow card) 79'	Report	Anselmo 23'; Botía (yellow card) 46'; Goodwin (yellow card) 74'; Luisinho (yellow card) 77', (goal) 90'; Bakshween (yellow card) 86'	Stadium: King Abdullah Sports City; Attendance: 0 (Note: Matches from 7 March and onwards will be played behind closed doors due to concerns over the coronavirus pandemic.); Referee: István Kovács (Romania)

5 August 2020 23	Al-Wehda	0–3	Al-Shabab	Mecca
19:30	Al-Sqoor (yellow card) 44'; Madkhali (yellow card) 46'; Anselmo (yellow card) 52'; Tambakti (yellow card) 62'; Renato (yellow card) 72' (yellow-red card) 76'; Bakshween (yellow card) 87'; Al-Sawadi (yellow card) 90'	Report	Sebá 34' (pen.); Diop 45' (pen.), 67'; Al-Sulayhem (yellow card) 56'; N'Diaye (red card) 86'	Stadium: King Abdul Aziz Stadium; Attendance: 0 Referee: Mohammed Al-Hoaish

9 August 2020 24	Al-Wehda	0–0	Al-Raed	Mecca
19:30	Luisinho (yellow card) 41'	Report	Al-Zain (yellow card) 13'; Pérez (yellow card) 20'; Al-Showaish (red card) 30'	Stadium: King Abdul Aziz Stadium; Attendance: 0 Referee: Irfan Peljto (Bosnia and Herzegovina)

15 August 2020 25	Al-Nassr	1–0	Al-Wehda	Riyadh
20:50	Giuliano (yellow card) 39'; Hamdallah 45+2'; S. Al-Ghanam (yellow card) 45+4'; Khamis (yellow card) 53'; Maicon (yellow card) 82'; Az. Al-Dawsari (yellow card) 90+1'	Report	Al-Nemer (red card) 25'; Botía (yellow card) 76'	Stadium: King Fahd International Stadium; Attendance: 0 Referee: Pavel Královec (Czech Republic)

20 August 2020 26	Al-Adalah	2–4	Al-Wehda	Al-Hasa
18:50	Gentsoglou 8' (pen.); Khrees (yellow card) 40'; Al-Yousef (yellow card) 49'; Hazazi 53'; Majrashi (yellow card) 90+6'	Report	Anselmo 11', 51'; Niakaté 25', 81'; Botía (yellow card) 27'; Luisinho (yellow card) 66'; Al-Qarni (yellow card) 71'	Stadium: Prince Abdullah bin Jalawi Stadium; Attendance: 0 Referee: Matthew Conger (New Zealand)

25 August 2020 27	Al-Wehda	2–1	Al-Taawoun	Mecca
19:20	Luisinho 15'; Niakaté 25'; Al-Jayzani (yellow card) 30'; Botía (yellow card) 53'; Bakshween (yellow card) 90'	Report	Amissi 7'; Assiri (yellow card) 21'; Al-Ruwaili (yellow card) 41'; Mendash (yellow card) 43'; Al-Zubaidi (yellow card) 72'	Stadium: King Abdul Aziz Stadium; Attendance: 0 Referee: David Roome (Scotland)

30 August 2020 28	Al-Faisaly	2–1	Al-Wehda	Al Majma'ah
18:55	Ashraf 29'; Guilherme 66'; Malayekah (yellow card) 78'; Al-Sebyani (yellow card) 81'	Report	Niakaté (yellow card) 56'; Luisinho 79' (pen.); Al-Qahtani (yellow card) 87'	Stadium: Al Majma'ah Sports City; Attendance: 0 Referee: João Pinheiro (Portugal)

4 September 2020 29	Al-Wehda	1–3	Al-Hilal	Mecca
20:35	Al-Sqoor (yellow card) 50'; Al-Qarni (yellow card) 55'; Bakshween (yellow card) 58'; Renato 79'	Report	Gomis 16'; Kanno 56'; Al-Faraj 85'; Cuéllar (yellow card) 90+6'	Stadium: King Abdul Aziz Stadium; Attendance: 0 Referee: Vítor Ferreira (Portugal)

9 September 2020 30	Al-Hazem	0–2	Al-Wehda	Ar Rass
20:35	Cafú (yellow card) 79'	Report	Niakaté 6', (yellow card) 26'; Botía (yellow card) 36'; Goodwin (yellow card) 50'; Luisinho 90+3'	Stadium: Al-Hazem Club Stadium; Attendance: 0 Referee: Ivan Bebek (Croatia)

=== King Cup ===
All times are local, AST (UTC+3).

5 November 2019 Round of 64	Al-Sharq	1–2	Al-Wehda	Al-Kharj
15:30	Khalil (yellow card) 56'; Boussaid 85'	Report	Anselmo (yellow card) 68'; Goodwin 78'; Niakaté 90+3' (pen.)	Stadium: Al-Shoulla Club Stadium; Referee: Sultan Al-Harbi

3 December 2019 Round of 32	Al-Wehda	1–0	Al-Khaleej	Mecca
18:15	Botía (yellow card) 12'; Niakaté 61', (yellow card) 88'	Report	Al-Najrani (yellow card) 26'; Al-Dhefiri (yellow card) 90+2'	Stadium: King Abdul Aziz Stadium; Referee: Mohammed Al-Nuhait

2 January 2020 Round of 16	Al-Wehda	0–0 (a.e.t.) (4–3 p)	Al-Raed	Mecca
19:50	Al-Qarni (yellow card) 17'; Al-Rio (yellow card) 71'; Al-Qahtani (yellow card) 87'; Niakaté (yellow card) 90+2'; Botía (yellow card) 114'; Renato (yellow card) 117'	Report	Al-Ghamdi (yellow card) 41'; Daoudi (yellow card) 92'; Doukha (yellow card) 120'	Stadium: King Abdul Aziz Stadium; Referee: Igor Pajac (Croatia)
	Penalties
	Goodwin (penalty missed); Niakaté (penalty scored); Al-Saiari (penalty scored); Al-Qahtani (penalty scored); Anselmo (penalty missed); Al-Shamlan (penalty scored)		(penalty scored) Fouzair; (penalty scored) Palomeque; (penalty missed) Al-Sahli; (penalty scored) Daoudi; (penalty missed) Al-Sharimi; (penalty missed) Pérez

18 January 2020 Quarter-finals	Al-Wehda	1–2	Al-Ahli	Mecca
18:40	Al-Zori 8'; Bakshween (yellow card) 23'; Chaves (yellow card) 29'; Goodwin (yellow card) 38'; Al-Qarni (yellow card) 41'; Al-Saiari (yellow card) 59'; Al-Nemer (yellow card) 90+3'	Report	Al Somah 26' (pen.), (yellow card) 54'; Al-Mowalad (yellow card) 27'; Marin 68'; Souza (yellow card) 73'	Stadium: King Abdul Aziz Stadium; Referee: Ivan Bebek (Croatia)

== Statistics ==
=== Appearances ===
Last updated on 9 September 2020.

No.	Pos	Nat	Player	Total		Pro League		King Cup	
No.	Pos	Nat	Player	Apps	Goals	Apps	Goals	Apps	Goals
Goalkeepers
13	GK	(Saudi Arabia) KSA	Abdulquddus Atiah	2	0	1	0	0+1	0
33	GK	(Saudi Arabia) KSA	Abdullah Al-Jadaani	22	0	18	0	4	0
Defenders
2	DF	(Saudi Arabia) KSA	Radhi Al-Otaibi	2	0	0+2	0	0	0
6	DF	(Brazil) BRA	Renato Chaves	29	3	25	3	4	0
12	DF	(Saudi Arabia) KSA	Abdulrahman Al-Rio	9	0	3+4	0	1+1	0
14	DF	(Spain) ESP	Alberto Botía	27	1	24	1	3	0
17	DF	(Saudi Arabia) KSA	Ali Al-Zubaidi	0	0	0	0	0	0
21	DF	(Saudi Arabia) KSA	Yassin Hamzah	7	0	2+4	0	1	0
23	DF	(Saudi Arabia) KSA	Noor Al-Rashidi	0	0	0	0	0	0
27	DF	(Saudi Arabia) KSA	Fawaz Al-Sqoor	34	1	30	1	4	0
28	DF	(Saudi Arabia) KSA	Hamad Al-Jayzani	13	0	13	0	0	0
88	DF	(Saudi Arabia) KSA	Hassan Tambakti	8	0	7+1	0	0	0
Midfielders
4	MF	(Saudi Arabia) KSA	Waleed Bakshween	31	0	27+1	0	2+1	0
7	MF	(Saudi Arabia) KSA	Mishari Al-Qahtani	6	0	1+4	0	1	0
8	MF	(Saudi Arabia) KSA	Mohammed Al-Qarni	19	0	9+7	0	2+1	0
9	MF	(Australia) AUS	Craig Goodwin	33	5	29	4	4	1
15	MF	(Saudi Arabia) KSA	Jaber Mustafa	13	0	5+7	0	1	0
16	MF	(Saudi Arabia) KSA	Ali Al-Nemer	16	0	6+8	0	0+2	0
22	MF	(Saudi Arabia) KSA	Faris Abdi	2	0	1+1	0	0	0
24	MF	(Saudi Arabia) KSA	Ayman Al-Khulaif	12	0	7+4	0	0+1	0
29	MF	(Saudi Arabia) KSA	Rakan Al-Shamlan	10	1	1+7	1	2	0
44	MF	(Saudi Arabia) KSA	Hatem Belal	3	0	0+3	0	0	0
49	MF	(Saudi Arabia) KSA	Sultan Al-Sawadi	6	0	0+6	0	0	0
50	MF	(Saudi Arabia) KSA	Nawaf Hawsawi	0	0	0	0	0	0
87	MF	(Brazil) BRA	Anselmo	29	10	25	10	3+1	0
91	MF	(Brazil) BRA	Luisinho	17	8	16	8	1	0
99	MF	(Brazil) BRA	Élton	13	0	10+2	0	0+1	0
Forwards
18	FW	(France) FRA	Youssouf Niakaté	33	18	29+1	16	3	2
20	FW	(Saudi Arabia) KSA	Jaber Asiri	5	0	0+5	0	0	0
51	FW	(Saudi Arabia) KSA	Mousa Madkhali	1	0	1	0	0	0
71	FW	(Eritrea) ERI	Ahmed Abdu Jaber	5	0	1+3	0	1	0
Players sent out on loan this season
70	FW	(Saudi Arabia) KSA	Mohammed Al-Saiari	13	0	0+11	0	1+1	0
77	MF	(Saudi Arabia) KSA	Mohammed Sufyani	1	0	0	0	0+1	0
Player who made an appearance this season but have left the club
3	DF	(Saudi Arabia) KSA	Abdullah Al-Zori	15	1	12	0	3	1
5	DF	(Benin) BEN	Khaled Adénon	1	0	1	0	0	0
10	MF	(Turkey) TUR	Emre Çolak	1	0	1	0	0	0
11	MF	(Brazil) BRA	Marcos Guilherme	13	1	10+1	1	2	0
25	DF	(Saudi Arabia) KSA	Faisel Darwish	8	0	2+5	0	1	0
30	GK	(Algeria) ALG	Moustapha Zeghba	11	0	11	0	0	0
31	DF	(Saudi Arabia) KSA	Sari Amr	2	0	2	0	0	0

=== Goalscorers ===
Rank	No.	Pos	Nat	Name	Pro League	King Cup	Total
1	18	FW	(France)	Youssouf Niakaté	16	2	18
2	87	MF	(Brazil)	Anselmo	10	0	10
3	91	MF	(Brazil)	Luisinho	8	0	8
4	9	MF	(Australia)	Craig Goodwin	4	1	5
5	6	DF	(Brazil)	Renato Chaves	3	0	3
6	3	DF	(Saudi Arabia)	Abdullah Al-Zori	0	1	1
6	11	MF	(Brazil)	Marcos Guilherme	1	0	1
6	14	DF	(Spain)	Alberto Botía	1	0	1
6	27	DF	(Saudi Arabia)	Fawaz Al-Sqoor	1	0	1
6	29	MF	(Saudi Arabia)	Rakan Al-Shamlan	1	0	1
Own goal					0	0	0
Total					45	4	49

Last Updated: 9 September 2020

=== Clean sheets ===
Rank	No.	Pos	Nat	Name	Pro League	King Cup	Total
1	33	GK	(Saudi Arabia)	Abdullah Al-Jadaani	5	2	7
2	30	GK	(Algeria)	Moustapha Zeghba	5	0	5
Total					10	2	12

Last Updated: 9 September 2020
