= Abdullah Al-Jadaani =

Saudi Arabian footballer

Personal information
- Full name: Abdullah Shamlah Al-Jadaani
- Date of birth: October 6, 1991 (age 35)
- Place of birth: Rabigh, Saudi Arabia
- Position: Goalkeeper

Senior career*
Years	Team	Apps	(Gls)
2010–2014	Al-Ahli	0	(0)
2013–2014	→ Al-Raed (loan)	0	(0)
2014–2016	Najran	11	(0)
2016–2017	Damac	24	(0)
2017–2020	Al-Wehda	50	(0)
2020–2022	Al-Hilal	3	(0)
2022–2024	Al-Ittihad	1	(0)
2024–2026	Abha	58	(0)
- * Club domestic league appearances and goals as of 1 June 2023

Abdullah Al-Jadaani (Arabic: عبد الله الجدعاني; born October 6, 1991), is a Saudi Arabian professional footballer who currently plays as a goalkeeper.

== Career ==
Al-Jadaani started his career at Al-Ahli and signed his first professional contract with the club on 25 July 2012. On 10 September 2013, Al-Jadaani was loaned out to Al-Raed. He made his debut on 3 December 2013 in the Crown Prince Cup match against Hetten. On 13 June 2014, Al-Jadaani joined Najran on a two-year contract. He made his league debut on 11 March 2015 against his former club Al-Ahli. On 7 June 2016, Al-Jadaani joined First Division Damac. After a year with Damac, Al-Jadaani left and signed for Pro League side Ohod.

On 12 June 2017, the Saudi FF announced that foreign goalkeepers would be allowed to play in the Pro League for the first time in history. On 30 June 2017, Ohod announced that they had signed Algerian international Azzedine Doukha. On the same day Al-Jadaani left Ohod and joined Al-Wehda to seek first team football. In his first season at the club, Al-Jadaani made 28 appearances as Al-Wehda achieved promotion to the Pro League at the first time of asking. In his second season, his role was reduced to back-up goalkeeper following the arrival of Egyptian international Mohamed Awad. He made 5 appearances in all competitions. In his third season at the club, he established himself as the first-choice goalkeeper and made 22 appearances in all competitions and kept 7 clean sheets.

On 31 January 2020, Al-Jadaani signed a pre-contract agreement with Al-Hilal and joined the club on a free transfer. He officially joined the club following the conclusion of the 2019–20 season. On 3 December 2020, Al-Jadaani made his debut and kept a clean sheet for Al-Hilal in the 3–0 win against Al-Fateh. Al-Jadaani would then start the next two league games which included a 1–0 win against Al-Raed and a 2–1 defeat to former club Al-Wehda. On 17 December 2020, Al-Jadaani made his final appearance for Al-Hilal, in a 2–0 defeat to Al-Fateh in the round of 16 of the King Cup.

On 29 August 2022, Al-Jadaani joined Al-Ittihad on a free transfer. In August 2024, Al-Jadaani joined Abha.

== Career statistics ==
=== Club ===
As of match played 30 May 2024

Club	Season	League			King Cup		Asia		Other		Total	
Club	Season	Division	Apps	Goals	Apps	Goals	Apps	Goals	Apps	Goals	Apps	Goals
Al-Raed (loan)	2013–14	Pro League	0	0	1	0	—		1 (Note: Appearances in Crown Prince Cup)	0	2	0
Najran	2014–15	Pro League	8	0	2	0	—		0	0	10	0
Najran	2015–16	Pro League	3	0	0	0	—		0	0	3	0
Najran	Total		11	0	2	0	0	0	0	0	13	0
Damac	2016–17	First Division	24	0	0	0	—		1	0	25	0
Al-Wehda	2017–18	MS League	28	0	0	0	—		—		28	0
Al-Wehda	2018–19	Pro League	4	0	1	0	—		—		5	0
Al-Wehda	2019–20	Pro League	18	0	4	0	—		—		22	0
Al-Wehda	Total		50	0	5	0	0	0	0	0	55	0
Al-Hilal	2020–21	Pro League	3	0	1	0	0	0	0	0	4	0
Al-Hilal	2021–22	Pro League	0	0	0	0	0	0	0	0	0	0
Al-Hilal	Total		3	0	1	0	0	0	0	0	4	0
Al-Ittihad	2022–23	Pro League	1	0	0	0	—		0	0	1	0
Al-Ittihad	2023–24	Pro League	0	0	0	0	0	0	0	0	0	0
Al-Ittihad	Total		1	0	0	0	0	0	0	0	1	0
Career totals			89	0	9	0	0	0	2	0	100	0

== Honours ==
Al-Wehda

- MS League: 2017–18

Al-Hilal

- Saudi Professional League: 2020–21, 2021–22
- King Cup: 2019–20
- AFC Champions League: 2021
- Saudi Super Cup: 2021

Al-Ittihad

- Saudi Professional League: 2022–23
- Saudi Super Cup: 2022
