= Fawaz Al-Sqoor =

Saudi Arabian footballer (born 1996)

Personal information
- Full name: Fawaz Ali Marzouq Al-Sqoor Al-Yami
- Date of birth: 23 April 1996 (age 30)
- Place of birth: Najran, Saudi Arabia
- Height: 1.76 m (5 ft 9 in)
- Position: Right back

Team information
- Current team: Al-Khaleej (on loan from Al-Ittihad)
- Number: 27

Youth career
- 2010-2014: Najran

Senior career*
Years	Team	Apps	(Gls)
2014–2018	Najran	60	(1)
2018–2020	Al Wehda	48	(2)
2020–2024	Al-Shabab	97	(2)
2024–	Al-Ittihad	38	(2)
2026	→ Al-Shabab (loan)	6	(0)
2026–	→ Al-Khaleej (loan)	1	(0)

International career^{‡}
2019–	Saudi Arabia	6	(1)
- * Club domestic league appearances and goals as of 12 September 2026 ‡ National team caps and goals as of 25 October 2025

Fawaz Ali Marzouq Al-Sqoor Al-Yami (Arabic: فواز علي الصقور اليامي; born April 23, 1996), is a Saudi Arabian professional footballer who plays as a right-back for Saudi Pro League club Al-Khaleej, on loan from Al-Ittihad, and the Saudi Arabia national team.

== Club career ==
On July 5, 2018, Fawaz Al-Sqoor left his boyhood club, Najran, to join Al-Wehda. On October 21, 2020, Fawaz Al-Sqoor left Al-Wehda to join Al-Shabab. On 31 January 2024, Al-Sqoor joined Al-Ittihad on a four-year deal. On 31 January 2026, Al-Sqoor joined Al-Shabab on loan for sex-month.

== Career statistics ==
As of match played 17 January 2025

Club	Season	League			King's Cup		Crown Prince Cup		Asia		Other		Total	
Club	Season	Division	Apps	Goals	Apps	Goals	Apps	Goals	Apps	Goals	Apps	Goals	Apps	Goals
Najran	2014–15	Saudi Pro League	4	0	0	0	—		—		—		4	0
Najran	2015–16	Saudi Pro League	3	0	0	0	1	0	—		—		3	0
Najran	2016–17	Saudi First Division League	23	0	1	0	2	0	—		2 (Note: Appearances in Relegation play-offs)	0	28	0
Najran	2017–18	Saudi First Division League	30	1	1	0	—		—		—		31	1
Najran	Total		60	1	2	0	3	0	0	0	2	0	67	1
Al Wehda	2018–19	Saudi Pro League	18	1	3	0	—		—		—		21	1
Al Wehda	2019–20	Saudi Pro League	30	1	4	0	—		—		—		34	1
Al Wehda	Total		48	2	7	0	0	0	0	0	0	0	55	2
Al Shabab	2020–21	Saudi Pro League	22	1	1	0	—		—		1 (Note: Appearance(s) in Arab Club Champions Cup)	0	24	1
Al Shabab	2021–22	Saudi Pro League	30	0	3	0	—		6 (Note: Appearance(s) in AFC Champions League)	0	—		39	0
Al Shabab	2022–23	Saudi Pro League	29	0	1	0	—		2	0	3	0	35	0
Al Shabab	2023–24	Saudi Pro League	16	1	3	0	—		—		5	0	24	1
Al Shabab	Total		97	2	8	0	0	0	8	0	9	0	122	2
Al-Ittihad	2023–24	Saudi Pro League	13	0	2	0	—		4	0	2 (Note: Appearance(s) in Saudi Super Cup)	0	21	0
Al-Ittihad	2024–25	Saudi Pro League	9	2	2	0	—		—		—		11	2
Al-Ittihad	Total		22	2	4	0	—		4	0	2	0	32	2
Career total			227	7	21	0	3	0	12	0	13	0	276	7

== Honours ==
Al-Ittihad

- Saudi Pro League: 2024–25
- King's Cup: 2024–25
