= Abdullah Al-Mohammed =

Saudi Arabian footballer

Personal information
- Full name: Abdullah Ali Al-Mohammed Al-Sudairy
- Date of birth: 12 March 1992 (age 34)
- Place of birth: Jeddah, Saudi Arabia
- Position: Midfielder

Team information
- Current team: Al-Entesar
- Number: 16

Youth career
- Al-Ahli

Senior career*
Years	Team	Apps	(Gls)
2012–2018	Al-Ahli	0	(0)
2015–2016	→ Al-Faisaly (loan)	16	(0)
2016–2017	→ Al-Khaleej (loan)	8	(0)
2018–2019	Al-Kawkab		
2019–2020	Al-Tai	12	(0)
2020	Ohod	16	(0)
2020–2021	Al-Diriyah	14	(1)
2021–2022	Bisha	11	(0)
2022	Jeddah	5	(0)
2022–2023	Tuwaiq		
2023	Al-Safa		
2023–2024	Al-Sahel		
2024–2025	Bisha		
2025–	Al-Entesar		
- * Club domestic league appearances and goals

Abdullah Al-Mohammed (Arabic: عبد الله المحمد (born 12 March 1992) is a Saudi football player who plays as a midfielder for Bisha.

== Career ==
On 19 September 2022, Al-Mohammed joined Tuwaiq.

On 16 September 2025, Al-Mohammed joined Al-Entesar.
