= Renato Chaves =

Brazilian footballer (born 1990)

Personal information
- Full name: Renato de Araújo Chaves Júnior
- Date of birth: 4 May 1990 (age 36)
- Place of birth: São Paulo, Brazil
- Height: 1.85 m (6 ft 1 in)
- Position: Centre back

Youth career
- 1998–2009: Corinthians

Senior career*
Years	Team	Apps	(Gls)
2009–2012	Corinthians	7	(1)
2010	→ Bahia (loan)	0	(0)
2011	→ Figueirense (loan)	6	(3)
2011	→ Portuguesa (loan)	19	(1)
2012	Portuguesa	18	(1)
2012–2014	Atlético Paranaense	2	(0)
2014	→ Náutico (loan)	20	(1)
2015	Ponte Preta	35	(3)
2016–2018	Fluminense	56	(3)
2018–2020	Al-Wehda	53	(5)
2020–2022	Al-Batin	52	(2)
2022	Juventude	2	(0)
- * Club domestic league appearances and goals

Renato de Araújo Chaves Júnior (born 4 May 1990), known as Renato Chaves or simply Renato, is a Brazilian former professional footballer who played as a central defender.

== Club career ==
=== Corinthians ===
Born in São Paulo, Renato joined Corinthians' youth setup in 2001, aged 11. In February 2008, after impressing in the previous years' Copa São Paulo de Futebol Júnior, he was promoted to the main squad.

Renato made his first team – and Série A – debut on 10 May 2009, starting in a 0–1 home loss against Internacional. He scored his first goal as a professional late in the month, but in a 1–3 away loss against Santos.

==== Loans to Bahia and Figueirense ====
On 16 August 2010 Renato was loaned to Bahia until the end of the year. After failing to adapt, he returned to his parent club only months later and moved to Figueirense in a one-year loan deal on 29 December.

=== Portuguesa ===
On 2 June 2011, after being rarely used, Renato moved to Série B side Portuguesa also in a temporary deal. He was signed permanently by Lusa in December 2011, after achieving promotion to the top level.

=== Atlético Paranaense ===
In July 2012, Renato joined Atlético Paranaense, back to the second tier. He was only a backup option for his new side, and struggled to even make the bench.

In February 2014, Renato refused to play with the under-23s in the year's Campeonato Paranaense, alleging he should be included in the first team squad; due to that, he was even more ostracized.

==== Loan to Náutico ====
In July 2014, after making only four appearances, Renato joined Náutico in the second tier, on loan until the end of the year.

=== Ponte Preta ===
After being regularly used, Renato joined Ponte Preta in December 2014, after his contract with Furacão expired. On 20 October 2015, after being a starter in the year's Brasileirão, he extended his contract for a further two years.

=== Fluminense ===
On 13 January 2016, Renato signed a three-year contract with Fluminense also in the top tier. In his first year, he was mainly used as a backup option to Gum and Henrique.

=== Al-Wehda ===
On 4 August 2018, Renato moved abroad for the first time in his career, and joined a host of compatriots at Al-Wehda. He immediately became a starter at his new side.

=== Al-Batin ===
On 5 October 2020, Renato signed for fellow Saudi Professional League side Al-Batin on a two-year deal.

=== Juventude ===
On 28 July 2022, Renato joined Juventude on a free transfer.

== Career statistics ==
As of 27 June 2021

Club	Season	League			State League		Cup		Continental		Other		Total	
Club	Season	Division	Apps	Goals	Apps	Goals	Apps	Goals	Apps	Goals	Apps	Goals	Apps	Goals
Corinthians	2009	Série A	7	1	—		—		—		—		7	1
Corinthians	2010	Série A	0	0	0	0	—		—		—		0	0
Corinthians	Total		7	1	0	0	0	0	—		—		7	1
Figueirense	2011	Série A	0	0	6	3	—		—		—		6	3
Portuguesa	2011	Série B	19	1	—		—		—		—		19	1
Portuguesa	2012	Série A	2	0	16	1	5	0	—		—		23	1
Portuguesa	Total		21	1	16	1	5	0	—		—		42	2
Atlético Paranaense	2012	Série B	0	0	—		—		—		—		0	0
Atlético Paranaense	2013	Série A	0	0	0	0	2	0	—		—		2	0
Atlético Paranaense	2014	Série A	0	0	2	0	0	0	—		—		2	0
Atlético Paranaense	Total		0	0	2	0	2	0	—		—		4	0
Náutico	2014	Série B	20	1	—		—		—		—		20	1
Ponte Preta	2015	Série A	29	2	6	1	5	0	0	0	—		40	3
Fluminense	2016	Série A	3	1	5	0	1	0	—		1 (Note: Appearance(s) in Primeira Liga)	0	10	1
Fluminense	2017	Série A	14	1	10	1	5	1	5 (Note: Appearance(s) in Copa Sudamericana)	2	2	0	36	5
Fluminense	2018	Série A	10	0	12	0	3	1	2	0	—		27	1
Fluminense	Total		27	2	27	1	9	2	7	2	3	0	73	9
Al-Wehda	2018–19	Saudi Professional League	28	2	—		4	1	—		—		32	3
Al-Wehda	2019–20	Saudi Professional League	25	3	—		4	0	—		—		29	3
Al-Wehda	Total		53	5	—		8	1	—		—		61	6
Al-Batin	2020–21	Saudi Professional League	23	1	—		2	1	—		—		25	2
Al-Batin	2021–22	Saudi Professional League	29	1	—		2	0	—		—		31	1
Al-Batin	Total		52	2	—		4	1	—		—		56	3
Career total			209	14	57	6	33	4	7	2	3	0	309	26

== Titles ==
Portuguesa

- Campeonato Brasileiro Série B: 2011
