= Waleed Mahboob =

Saudi Arabian footballer

Personal information
- Full name: Waleed Mahboob Mojammami
- Date of birth: December 21, 1985 (age 40)
- Place of birth: Jeddah, Saudi Arabia
- Height: 1.74 m (5 ft 8 1/2 in)
- Position: Right-back

Youth career
- Al-Ahli

Senior career*
Years	Team	Apps	(Gls)
2006–2008	Abha	??	(5)
2008–2011	Al-Wehda	37	(1)
2011–2012	Al-Ansar	15	(1)
2012–2013	Al-Ettifaq	13	(0)
2013	→ Al-Wehda (loan)	10	(0)
2013–2018	Al-Wehda	81	(2)
2019–2020	Jeddah	32	(0)
2020–2021	Al-Entesar		
2022	Al-Ula		
- * Club domestic league appearances and goals

Waleed Mahboob (Arabic: وليد محبوب; born 21 December 1985) is a Saudi football player. He currently plays as a right-back.
