= Faisel Majrashi =

Saudi Arabian footballer

Personal information
- Full name: Faisel Majrashi
- Date of birth: 10 October 1984 (age 42)
- Place of birth: Saudi Arabia
- Height: 1.64 m (5 ft 4 1/2 in)
- Position: Winger

Team information
- Current team: Ras Tanura
- Number: 11

Youth career
- Al-Nahda

Senior career*
Years	Team	Apps	(Gls)
2004–2015	Al-Nahda		
2015	Al-Qaisumah		
2015–2017	Al-Nojoom		
2017–2018	Al-Qaisumah		
2018–2019	Al-Sahel		
2019–2020	Al Salam		
2020	Al-Entesar		
2020–2021	Al-Noor		
2021–	Ras Tanura		
- * Club domestic league appearances and goals

Faisel Majrashi (Arabic:فيصل مجرشي; born 10 October 1984) is a Saudi Arabian football (soccer) player who plays for Ras Tanura as a winger.
