= Nawaf Al-Harthi =

Saudi Arabian footballer (born 1998)

Personal information
- Full name: Nawaf Khaled Al-Harthi
- Date of birth: October 12, 1998 (age 28)
- Place of birth: Saudi Arabia
- Height: 1.69 m (5 ft 7 in)
- Position: Midfielder

Team information
- Current team: Al-Fayha
- Number: 7

Youth career
- –2017: Al-Wehda

Senior career*
Years	Team	Apps	(Gls)
2017–2020	Al-Wehda	5	(0)
2019–2020	→ Al-Ain (loan)	21	(2)
2020–2023	Al-Ain	63	(0)
2023–	Al-Fayha	14	(1)
- * Club domestic league appearances and goals as of 29 February 2024

Nawaf Al-Harthi (Arabic: نواف الحارثي; born 12 October 1998) is a Saudi professional footballer who plays as a midfielder for Pro League club Al-Fayha.

== Career ==
Al-Harthi started his career with Al-Wehda and was promoted from the youth team to the first team in 2018. On 21 August 2019, he joined Al-Ain on a season-long loan. On 21 October 2020, Al-Harthi joined Al-Ain on a permanent deal.

On 3 July 2023, Al-Harthi joined Al-Fayha on a free transfer.

== Career statistics ==
=== Club ===
As of 30 May 2021

Club	Season	League			King Cup		Asia		Other		Total	
Club	Season	Division	Apps	Goals	Apps	Goals	Apps	Goals	Apps	Goals	Apps	Goals
Al-Wehda	2017–18	MS League	3	0	1	0	—		—		4	0
Al-Wehda	2018–19	Pro League	2	0	1	0	—		—		3	0
Al-Wehda	Club Total		5	0	2	0	0	0	0	0	7	0
Al-Ain (loan)	2019–20	MS League	21	2	2	1	—		—		23	3
Al-Ain	2020–21	Pro League	7	0	1	0	—		—		8	0
Al-Ain	Club Total		28	2	3	1	0	0	0	0	31	3
Career Total			33	2	5	1	0	0	0	0	38	3
