= Kamel Al-Mor =

Saudi Arabian footballer

Personal information
- Full name: Kamel Omar Othman Fallatah Al-Mor
- Date of birth: March 31, 1983 (age 43)
- Place of birth: Saudi Arabia, Makkah
- Height: 1.68 m (5 ft 6 in)
- Position: Right-back

Youth career
- 2004–2006: Al-Wehda

Senior career*
Years	Team	Apps	(Gls)
2006–2010	Al-Wehda	100	(7)
2010–2013	Al-Ahli	58	(0)
2013–2015	Al-Nassr	9	(0)
2015–2016	Al-Taawoun	11	(0)
2016–2018	Al-Wehda	35	(2)
2018–2019	Jeddah	20	(2)
2019–2020	Al-Ansar		
2020	Al-Entesar		

International career
2008	Saudi Arabia	2	(0)
- * Club domestic league appearances and goals as of 18 April 2018

Kamel Fallatah Al-Mor (Arabic: كامل فلاته المر; born 31 March 1983) was a Saudi professional footballer who played as a right-back .

== Club career ==
=== Early life ===
Kamel was born in Mecca, Saudi Arabia in 1983, the age of eighteen he played Al-Wahda (Mecca) club.

=== Al-Ahli ===
In May 2010, Kamel signed with Al-Ahli for 7.000.000 SR, and has become a staple with the club. In the 2011–12 season, Kamel helped Al-Ahli to a second-place finish. He made 40 appearances and scored a goal.

== Honours ==
=== Club ===
Al-Ahli

- Saudi Champions Cup: 2011, 2012

Al-Nassr

- Saudi Crown Prince Cup: 2013-14
- Saudi Professional League: 2013-14, 2014-15

Al-Wehda

- Prince Mohammad bin Salman League: 2017-18
