= Abdulellah Al-Malki =

Saudi Arabian footballer (born 1994)

Personal information
- Full name: Abdulellah Saad Hamid Al-Wahbi Al-Malki
- Date of birth: 11 October 1994 (age 32)
- Place of birth: Ta'if, Saudi Arabia
- Height: 1.76 m (5 ft 9 in)
- Position: Midfielder

Team information
- Current team: Al-Diriyah
- Number: 89

Youth career
- Al-Wehda

Senior career*
| Years | Team | Apps | (Gls) |
| 2014–2019 | Al-Wehda | 84 | (6) |
| 2019–2022 | Al-Ittihad | 63 | (3) |
| 2022–2026 | Al-Hilal | 7 | (0) |
| 2024–2025 | → Al-Ettifaq (loan) | 22 | (0) |
| 2026– | Al-Diriyah | 2 | (1) |

International career
| 2015–2017 | Saudi Arabia U23 | | |
| 2019–2024 | Saudi Arabia | 39 | (0) |
- * Club domestic league appearances and goals as of 21 August 2026

Abdulellah Saad Hamid Al-Wahbi Al-Malki (Arabic: عبد الإله سعد حميد الوهبي المالكي; born 11 October 1994) is a Saudi professional footballer who currently plays as a midfielder for Saudi Pro League club Al-Diriyah.

== Career ==
=== Club ===
Al-Malki previously played for Al-Wehda from 2015 until 2019. He helped Al-Wehda earn promotion to the Pro League twice, first in 2014–15 as runners-up and second in 2017–18 after winning the MS League. He joined Al-Ittihad during the summer transfer window of 2019. He spent three years at the club and made 81 appearances in all competitions. On 22 January 2022, Al-Malki joined rivals Al-Hilal on a four-year contract. On 9 July 2024, Al-Malki joined Al-Ettifaq on a one-year loan. On 14 January 2026, Al-Malki joined Al-Diriyah.

=== International ===
He was first called up to the Saudi Arabia national team in 2019 and went on to play a role in helping Saudi Arabia qualify for the 2022 FIFA World Cup. He gained prominence in the World Cup, however, by a fatal mistake in the next game against Poland, as he mishandled the ball and let Robert Lewandowski intercept it, eventually leading to the Polish striker to score his first-ever World Cup goal as Saudi Arabia lost 2–0. Saudi Arabia went on to be eliminated from the group stage, despite achieving a historic 2–1 shock win over Argentina in the opener.

== Career statistics ==
=== Club ===
As of 31 May 2024.

Appearances and goals by club, season and competition
| Club | Season | League | | | National Cup | | League Cup | | Continental | | Other | | Total | |
| Club | Season | Division | Apps | Goals | Apps | Goals | Apps | Goals | Apps | Goals | Apps | Goals | Apps | Goals |
|---|---|---|---|---|---|---|---|---|---|---|---|---|---|---|
| Al-Wehda | 2014–15 | First Division | 3 | 0 | 1 | 0 | 0 | 0 | — | | — | | 4 | 0 |
| Al-Wehda | 2015–16 | Pro League | 19 | 0 | 2 | 0 | 2 | 0 | — | | — | | 23 | 0 |
| Al-Wehda | 2016–17 | Pro League | 19 | 1 | 2 | 0 | 3 | 0 | — | | — | | 24 | 1 |
| Al-Wehda | 2017–18 | MS League | 26 | 5 | 0 | 0 | — | | — | | — | | 26 | 5 |
| Al-Wehda | 2018–19 | Pro League | 17 | 0 | 2 | 0 | — | | — | | — | | 19 | 0 |
| Al-Wehda | Total | | 84 | 6 | 7 | 0 | 5 | 0 | 0 | 0 | 0 | 0 | 96 | 6 |
| Al-Ittihad | 2019–20 | Pro League | 26 | 2 | 2 | 0 | — | | 4 | 0 | 6 (Note: Appearances in Arab Club Champions Cup) | 1 | 38 | 3 |
| Al-Ittihad | 2020–21 | Pro League | 23 | 1 | 2 | 0 | — | | — | | 2 | 0 | 27 | 1 |
| Al-Ittihad | 2021–22 | Pro League | 14 | 0 | 1 | 0 | — | | — | | 1 | 0 | 16 | 0 |
| Al-Ittihad | Total | | 63 | 3 | 5 | 0 | 0 | 0 | 4 | 0 | 9 | 1 | 81 | 4 |
| Al Hilal | 2021–22 | Pro League | 0 | 0 | 0 | 0 | — | | 0 | 0 | 0 | 0 | 0 | 0 |
| Al Hilal | 2022–23 | Pro League | 3 | 0 | 1 | 0 | — | | 0 | 0 | 0 | 0 | 4 | 0 |
| Al Hilal | 2023-24 | Pro League | 3 | 0 | 1 | 0 | — | | 3 | 1 | 0 | 0 | 7 | 1 |
| Al Hilal | Total | | 6 | 0 | 2 | 0 | 0 | 0 | 3 | 1 | 0 | 0 | 11 | 1 |
| Career total | | | 153 | 9 | 14 | 0 | 5 | 0 | 7 | 1 | 9 | 1 | 188 | 11 |

=== International ===
Appearances and goals by national team and year
| National team | Year | Apps | Goals |
|---|---|---|---|
| Saudi Arabia | 2019 | 8 | 0 |
| Saudi Arabia | 2020 | 2 | 0 |
| Saudi Arabia | 2021 | 9 | 0 |
| Saudi Arabia | 2022 | 10 | 0 |
| Saudi Arabia | 2023 | 3 | 0 |
| Saudi Arabia | 2024 | 7 | 0 |
| Total | | 39 | 0 |

== Honours ==
Al-Wehda Club

- MS League: 2017–18

Al-Hilal

- Saudi Professional League: 2021–22, 2023–24
- Kings Cup: 2022–23, 2023–24
- Saudi Super Cup: 2023
