= Muhannad Al-Faresi =

Saudi Arabian footballer

Personal information
- Full name: Muhannad Hamed Al-Faresi
- Date of birth: August 22, 1991 (age 35)
- Place of birth: Jeddah, Saudi Arabia
- Height: 1.71 m (5 ft 7 1/2 in)
- Positions: Attacking midfielder; winger

Team information
- Current team: Al-Hada
- Number: 7

Youth career
- 2006–2012: Al-Ahli

Senior career*
Years	Team	Apps	(Gls)
2012–2013	Al-Ahli	0	(0)
2013–2018	Al-Wehda	83	(26)
2019	Damac	5	(0)
2019–2020	Al-Shoulla	2	(0)
2020	Al-Nahda		
2020–2021	Al-Adalah	22	(2)
2021–2022	Al-Ain	25	(3)
2022–2023	Al-Safa		
2023	Al-Entesar		
2023–2025	Al-Jubail		
2025	Wej		
2025–	Al-Hada		
- * Club domestic league appearances and goals

Muhannad Al-Faresi (Arabic: مهند الفارسي; born 22 August 1991) is a Saudi football player who currently plays as a forward for Al-Hada.

== Career ==
On 7 February 2023, Al-Faresi joined SDL side Al-Entesar.

On 10 September 2023, Al-Faresi joined Al-Jubail.

On 13 August 2025, Al-Faresi joined Wej.
