= Youssoufou Niakaté =

Malian footballer (born 1992)

Personal information
- Full name: Youssoufou Niakaté
- Date of birth: 16 December 1992 (age 33)
- Place of birth: Coulommiers, France
- Height: 1.78 m (5 ft 10 in)
- Position: Forward

Team information
- Current team: Baniyas
- Number: 12

Youth career
- US Lusitanos

Senior career*
Years	Team	Apps	(Gls)
2012–2014	Aubervilliers	55	(14)
2014–2016	Avranches	38	(9)
2016–2017	US Créteil	45	(7)
2017–2018	Boulogne	25	(6)
2018–2019	Union SG	36	(22)
2019–2021	Al-Wehda	53	(27)
2021–2022	Al-Ittihad	8	(0)
2022–2023	Al-Ettifaq	34	(9)
2023–	Baniyas	49	(22)

International career^{‡}
2023–	Mali	5	(1)
- * Club domestic league appearances and goals as of 20 May 2025 ‡ National team caps and goals as of 24 March 2025

Youssoufou Niakaté (born 16 December 1992) is a footballer who plays as a forward for UAE club Baniyas. Born in France, he plays for the Mali national team.

== Club career ==
On 27 September 2018 he scored a hattrick against RSC Anderlecht in the Belgian Cup. Union SG won the game 0–3.

On 22 July 2023, Niakaté joined Baniyas.

== International career ==
Born in France, Niakaté is of Malian descent. He was called up to the Mali national team for a set of 2026 FIFA World Cup qualification matches in November 2023.

== Career statistics ==
=== Club ===
As of match played 20 May 2025

Appearances and goals by club, season and competition
Club	Season	League			National cup (Note: Includes Moroccan Throne Cup, UAE President's Cup)		League cup (Note: Includes UAE League Cup)		Continental		Other		Total	
Club	Season	Division	Apps	Goals	Apps	Goals	Apps	Goals	Apps	Goals	Apps	Goals	Apps	Goals
Aubervilliers	2011–12	CFA	27	4	1	0	0	0	0	0	0	0	28	4
Aubervilliers	2012–13	CFA	28	10	0	0	0	0	0	0	0	0	28	10
Aubervilliers	Total		55	14	1	0	–		0	0	0	0	56	14
Avranches	2013–14	CN	25	5	5	1	0	0	0	0	0	0	30	6
Avranches	2014–15	CN	13	4	3	2	0	0	0	0	0	0	16	6
Avranches	Total		38	9	8	3	–		0	0	0	0	46	12
Créteil	2015–16	Ligue 2	17	1	0	0	0	0	0	0	0	0	17	1
Créteil	2016–17	CN	28	6	1	1	0	0	0	0	0	0	29	7
Créteil	Total		45	7	1	1	–		0	0	0	0	46	8
Boulogne	2017–18	CN	25	6	3	0	–		–		–		28	6
US Gilloise	2018–19	CPL	26	13	4	3	–		–		10	9	40	25
Al Wehda	2019–20	SPL	30	16	3	2	0	0	0	0	0	0	33	18
Al Wehda	2020–21	SPL	23	11	0	0	0	0	1	0	0	0	24	11
Al Wehda	Total		53	27	3	2	–		1	0	0	0	57	29
Al-Ittihad	2021–22	SPL	8	0	1	0	0	0	0	0	0	0	9	0
Al-Ettifaq	2021–22	SPL	9	1	0	0	0	0	0	0	0	0	9	1
Al-Ettifaq	2022–23	SPL	25	8	0	0	0	0	0	0	0	0	25	8
Baniyas	2023–24	UAE Pro League	26	9	0	0	2	0	0	0	–		28	9
Baniyas	2024–25	UAE Pro League	23	13	2	0	4	2	–		–		29	15
Baniyas	Total		49	22	2	0	6	2	0	0	–		57	24
Career total			333	107	23	9	6	2	1	0	10	9	373	127

=== International ===
As of match played 24 March 2025

Appearances and goals by national team and year
National team	Year	Apps	Goals
Mali	2023	1	1
Mali	2024	3	0
Mali	2025	1	0
Total		5	1

Scores and results list Mali's goal tally first.

List of international goals scored by Youssoufou Niakaté
No.	Date	Venue	Opponent	Score	Result	Competition
1	17 November 2023	Stade du 26 Mars, Bamako, Mali	Chad	2–1	3–1	2026 FIFA World Cup qualification
2	6 January 2024	Stade du 26 Mars, Bamako, Mali	Guinea-Bissau	1–0	6–2	Friendly
