= Abo Baker Adam =

Bahraini footballer

Personal information
- Full name: Abo Baker Mohamed Adam
- Date of birth: January 1, 1988 (age 38)
- Place of birth: Bahrain
- Position: Defender

Senior career*
Years	Team	Apps	(Gls)
2009–2010	Al-Najma		
2010–2011	Manama Club		
2011–2013	Riffa SC		
2013	Al-Najma		
2013–2015	Al-Muharraq SC		
2015	Al-Ettifaq	3	(0)
2015–2017	Al-Orobah F.C.		

International career
2014–2016	Bahrain	2	(2)
- * Club domestic league appearances and goals

Abo Baker Adam is a Bahrain international football defender.

== International ==
Ahead of the 2019 AFC Asian Cup qualification, in a friendly, the 28-year old scored two goals in an emphatic 3–1 defeat of the Philippines.

== International Goals ==
#	Opponent	Date	Score	Scored
1.	Philippines	2016	3-1	2
