= Fahad Al-Johani (footballer, born 1987) =

Saudi Arabian footballer

Personal information
- Full name: Fahad Barakah Al-Marwani Al-Johani
- Date of birth: September 7, 1987 (age 39)
- Place of birth: Saudi Arabia
- Height: 1.81 m (5 ft 11 1/2 in)
- Position: Defender

Team information
- Current team: Mudhar
- Number: 89

Youth career
- Al-Ansar

Senior career*
Years	Team	Apps	(Gls)
2008–2014	Al-Ansar		
2014	Al-Ettifaq	0	(0)
2014–2017	Al-Orobah	48	(1)
2017–2018	Al-Wehda	23	(1)
2018–2019	Al-Tai	33	(3)
2019–2020	Abha	0	(0)
2020	Al-Tai	13	(0)
2020–2023	Ohod	65	(1)
2022	→ Al-Khaleej (loan)	10	(0)
2023–2024	Al-Ula	9	(1)
2024	Al-Entesar		
2024–2025	Al-Taraji		
2025–	Mudhar		
- * Club domestic league appearances and goals

Fahad Al-Johani (Arabic: فهد الجهني; born September 7, 1987) is a Saudi football player who plays for Al-Taraji as a defender for Mudhar.

On 16 September 2025, Al-Johani joined Mudhar.
