= Abdullah Al-Shammeri (footballer, born 1993) =

Saudi Arabian footballer

Personal information
- Full name: Abdullah Haif Al-Shammeri
- Date of birth: 17 September 1993 (age 33)
- Place of birth: Diriyah, Saudi Arabia
- Height: 1.82 m (6 ft 0 in)
- Position: Defender

Youth career
- –2012: Al-Jabalain

Senior career*
Years	Team	Apps	(Gls)
2012–2013	Al-Jabalain		
2013–2018	Al-Taawoun	40	(2)
2018–2019	Al-Ittihad	0	(0)
2019	Al-Wehda	0	(0)
2019–2023	Al-Hazem	58	(0)
2021	→ Al-Jabalain (loan)	16	(2)

International career^{‡}
2017	Saudi Arabia	1	(0)
- * Club domestic league appearances and goals as of 29 May 2023 ‡ National team caps and goals as of 9 February 2025

Abdullah Haif Al-Shammeri (Arabic: عَبْد الله حَايِف الشَّمَّرِيّ; born 17 September 1993) is a Saudi professional footballer who plays as a defender.
