= Sami Bashir =

Saudi football player

Personal information
- Full name: Sami Bashir Hawsawi
- Date of birth: February 5, 1989 (age 37)
- Place of birth: Saudi Arabia
- Height: 1.78 m (5 ft 10 in)
- Position: Left back

Youth career
- Al-Hilal FC

Senior career*
| Years | Team | Apps | (Gls) |
| 2008–2014 | Al-Hazm F.C. | | |
| 2014–2016 | Al-Faisaly | 23 | (0) |
| 2016–2017 | Najran SC | | |
| 2018–2020 | Al-Kholood | | |
- * Club domestic league appearances and goals

Sami Bashir is a Saudi football player who last played for Al-Hazm F.C.
