= Hatim Belal =

Saudi professional football player (born 1994)

Personal information
- Full name: Hatim Belal
- Date of birth: 30 January 1994 (age 32)
- Place of birth: Medina, Saudi Arabia
- Height: 1.85 m (6 ft 1 in)
- Positions: Defender; midfielder

Team information
- Current team: Al-Ansar
- Number: 4

Youth career
- Al-Ansar

Senior career*
Years	Team	Apps	(Gls)
2013–2014	Al-Ansar		
2014–2017	Al-Wehda	32	(2)
2017–2019	Al-Fayha	1	(0)
2018	→ Al-Qadsiah (loan)	5	(0)
2018–2019	→ Al-Qadsiah (loan)	13	(0)
2019–2022	Al-Wehda	34	(0)
2021	→ Al-Bukayriyah (loan)	16	(1)
2022–2023	Al-Arabi	26	(0)
2023–2024	Al-Faisaly	4	(0)
2024–2025	Al-Nahda		
2025–	Al-Ansar		

International career^{‡}
2019–	Saudi Arabia	2	(0)
- * Club domestic league appearances and goals as of 21:32, 16 May 2019 (UTC) ‡ National team caps and goals as of 21:32, 10 August 2019 (UTC)

Hatim Belal (Arabic: حاتم بلال; born 30 January 1994) is a Saudi professional football player who plays for Al-Ansar as a defender and midfielder.

== Career ==
He began his career with Al-Ansar where he was promoted from the youth team to the first team. Belal spent 1 season with the first team before joining Al-Wehda in the summer of 2014. Belal helped Al-Wehda win promotion to the Pro League in his first season with the club. He spent 3 seasons with Al-Wehda and made 34 league appearances scoring 3 goals. At the end of the 2016–17 season, Al-Wehda were relegated back to the First Division. In the summer of 2017, Belal joined Al-Fayha on a 4 year contract.

On 18 July 2022, Belal joined Al-Arabi. On 2 July 2023, Belal joined Al-Faisaly. On 17 August 2025, Belal joined Al-Ansar.
