= Ali Al-Nemer =

Saudi Arabian international footballer (born 1991)

Personal information
- Full name: Ali Saleh Mohammed Al-Nemer
- Date of birth: 25 August 1991 (age 35)
- Place of birth: Riyadh, Saudi Arabia
- Height: 1.68 m (5 ft 6 in)
- Position: Midfielder

Team information
- Current team: Ohod
- Number: 10

Senior career*
Years	Team	Apps	(Gls)
2018	Al-Shabab	0	(0)
2018	→ Numancia (loan)	0	(0)
2018–2020	Al-Wehda	39	(0)
2020–2022	Al-Taawoun	17	(1)
2022–2023	Al-Fayha	8	(0)
2023–	Ohod	49	(1)

International career^{‡}
2017–2019	Saudi Arabia	5	(0)
- * Club domestic league appearances and goals as of 6 March 2020 ‡ National team caps and goals as of 10 August 2019

Ali Saleh Mohammed Al-Nemer (Arabic: علي صالح محمد النمر; born 25 August 1991) is a Saudi Arabian international footballer who plays for Ohod as a midfielder.

== Club career ==
Born in Riyadh, Al-Nemer never played with any professional clubs before being called up for the national team in 2017. In January 2018, after impressing with the national side, he signed an 18-month professional contract with Al-Shabab FC, and on 21 January, he was loaned to Spanish Segunda División side CD Numancia for six months.

Al-Nemer left Numancia on 15 May 2018 without playing a single minute.

On 17 July 2018, Al-Nemer officially signed for newly promoted club Al-Wehda.

On 25 October 2020, Al-Nemer officially signed for Al-Taawoun.

On 30 January 2022, Al-Nemer joined Al-Fayha.

On 15 July 2023, Al-Nemer joined First Division side Ohod.

== International career ==
Called up to the Saudi Arabia national team in December 2017 for the 23rd Arabian Gulf Cup, Al-Nemer made his full international debut on 25 December, starting in a 0–0 draw against United Arab Emirates.

== Honours ==
Al-Fayha

- King Cup: 2021–22
