= Sultan Al-Dossari =

Saudi Arabian footballer

Personal information
- Full name: Sultan Mefreh Al-Dossari
- Date of birth: January 1, 1990 (age 36)
- Place of birth: Saudi Arabia
- Height: 1.89 m (6 ft 2 1/2 in)
- Position: Midfielder

Youth career
- Al-Wehda

Senior career*
Years	Team	Apps	(Gls)
2009–2011	Al-Wehda	0	(0)
2011–2013	Al-Ahli	0	(0)
2012–2013	→ Al-Faisaly (loan)	2	(0)
2016–2018	Al-Wehda	34	(0)
2018–2019	Al-Shoulla	15	(0)
2019–2020	Najran	16	(0)
2020	Al-Qadsiah	8	(0)
2020–2021	Arar	28	(1)
2021–2022	Al-Nahda	20	(0)
2023	Al-Sharq		
2023–2025	Tuwaiq		
- * Club domestic league appearances and goals

Sultan Al-Dossari (Arabic: سلطان الدوسري; born 1 January 1990) is a Saudi football player who currently plays as a midfielder.
