= Mousa Madkhali =

Saudi Arabian footballer

Personal information
- Full name: Mousa Hadi Madkhali
- Date of birth: December 19, 1987 (age 38)
- Place of birth: Jizan, Saudi Arabia
- Height: 1.76 m (5 ft 9 1/2 in)
- Position: Forward

Senior career*
Years	Team	Apps	(Gls)
2008–2014	Hetten		(22)
2014–2020	Al-Wehda	84	(38)
2019	→ Al-Ain (loan)	14	(1)
2020–2021	Al-Adalah	15	(1)
2021–2022	Al-Entesar		
2022–2024	Hetten		
- * Club domestic league appearances and goals as of 7 January 2019

Mousa Madkhali (Arabic: موسى مدخلي; born 19 December 1987) is a retired Saudi Arabian professional footballer who played as a striker for Al-Wehda and Hetten.

== Honours ==
Al-Wehda

- Prince Mohammad bin Salman League: 2017–18
