= Amer Haroon =

Saudi Arabian footballer

Personal information
- Full name: Amer Haroon
- Date of birth: August 27, 1992 (age 34)
- Place of birth: Saudi Arabia
- Height: 1.77 m (5 ft 10 in)
- Position: Defender

Team information
- Current team: Al-Washm
- Number: 13

Senior career*
Years	Team	Apps	(Gls)
2014–2016	Al-Shabab	9	(0)
2015–2016	→ Al-Wehda (loan)	11	(0)
2016–2018	Al-Wehda	19	(1)
2019–2022	Al-Ain	30	(1)
2022–2023	Al-Arabi	4	(0)
2023	Al-Suqoor		
2023–	Al-Washm		
- * Club domestic league appearances and goals as of 20 September 2020

Amer Haroon (Arabic: عامر هارون; born 27 August 1992) is a Saudi professional footballer who currently plays for Al-Washm as a defender .

== Honours ==
Al-Wehda

- Prince Mohammad bin Salman League: 2017–18
