= Issam Al-Qarni =

Saudi Arabian footballer

Personal information
- Full name: Issam Al-Qarni
- Date of birth: 29 April 1995 (age 31)
- Place of birth: Jeddah, Saudi Arabia
- Height: 1.70 m (5 ft 7 in)
- Position: Midfielder

Team information
- Current team: Al-Diriyah
- Number: 6

Youth career
- 2004–2014: Al-Ittihad
- 2014–2015: Al-Nassr

Senior career*
Years	Team	Apps	(Gls)
2015–2017	Al-Nassr	1	(0)
2017–2019	Al-Wehda	30	(2)
2019	→ Damac	4	(0)
2019–2020	Ohod	1	(0)
2020	Hetten		
2020–2022	Wej		
2022	Al-Entesar		
2022–2024	Al-Arabi	51	(4)
2024–	Al-Diriyah		
- * Club domestic league appearances and goals as of 22:07, 16 May 2019 (UTC)

Issam Al-Qarni (Arabic: عصام القرني; born 29 April 1995 in Jeddah) is a Saudi professional football player who currently plays as a midfielder for Al-Diriyah.

On 24 July 2024, Al-Qarni joined Al-Diriyah.

== Honours ==
Al-Wehda

- Prince Mohammad bin Salman League: 2017–18
