= Ahmed Al-Shamrani =

Saudi Arabian footballer

Personal information
- Full name: Ahmed Mohammed Al-Shamrani
- Date of birth: April 24, 1994 (age 32)
- Place of birth: Al-Hasa, Saudi Arabia
- Height: 1.75 m (5 ft 9 in)
- Position: Centre back

Team information
- Current team: Jeddah
- Number: 4

Youth career
- Al-Ittihad

Senior career*
Years	Team	Apps	(Gls)
2016–2017	Al-Ittihad	0	(0)
2016–2017	→ Al-Batin (loan)	8	(0)
2017–2019	Al-Wehda	19	(0)
2019–2021	Al-Hazem	24	(0)
2021–2022	Al-Ain	31	(1)
2022–2023	Hajer	21	(0)
2023–2024	Al-Najma	24	(0)
2025–	Jeddah	0	(0)
- * Club domestic league appearances and goals as of 31 May 2021

Ahmed Al-Shamrani (Arabic: أحمد الشمراني; born 24 April 1994) is a Saudi Arabian professional footballer who plays as a defender for Jeddah.

== Club career ==
On 30 July 2017, Al-Shamrani signed for Al-Wehda. He helped the club achieve promotion to the Saudi Professional League in his first season.

On 3 September 2021, Al-Shamrani joined Al-Ain.

On 16 August 2022, Al-Shamrani joined Hajer.

On 8 June 2023, Al-Shamrani joined Al-Najma.

On 7 September 2025, Al-Shamrani joined Jeddah.

== Honours ==
Al-Wehda

- MS League: 2017–18

Al-Hazem

- MS League: 2020–21
