= Mohammed Al-Otaibi =

Saudi Arabian footballer

Personal information
- Full name: Mohammed Naif Al-Qathami Al-Otaibi
- Date of birth: May 11, 1993 (age 33)
- Place of birth: Mecca, Saudi Arabia
- Height: 1.73 m (5 ft 8 in)
- Position: Midfielder

Team information
- Current team: Ohod
- Number: 7

Youth career
- Al-Wehda

Senior career*
Years	Team	Apps	(Gls)
2016–2020	Al-Wehda	45	(12)
2019–2020	→ Al-Batin (loan)	11	(0)
2020–2022	Ohod	33	(4)
2022	Hajer	13	(0)
2022–2023	Al-Shoulla	6	(0)
2023–	Ohod	33	(3)
2024	→ Al-Ula	10	(0)
- * Club domestic league appearances and goals as of 24 January 2022

Mohammed Al-Otaibi (Arabic: محمد العتيبي; born 11 May 1993) is a Saudi professional footballer who plays for Ohod as a midfielder for Al-Ula.

== Honours ==
Al-Wehda

- MS League: 2017–18

Al-Batin

- MS League: 2019–20

Al-Ula

- Saudi Third Division: 2023–24
