= Ahmed Abdu Jaber =

Saudi footballer (born 1993)

Ahmed Abdu
Personal information
- Full name: Ahmed Abdu Jaber
- Date of birth: 23 December 1993 (age 32)
- Place of birth: Jeddah, Saudi Arabia
- Height: 1.75 m (5 ft 9 in)
- Position: Striker

Senior career*
| Years | Team | Apps | (Gls) |
| 2014–2015 | Al-Fayha | ? | (0) |
| 2016 | Al-Riyadh | ? | (0) |
| 2016–2017 | Al-Adalh | 25 | (16) |
| 2018 | Al-Tai | 12 | (5) |
| 2018–2022 | Al-Wehda | 82 | (29) |
| 2022–2023 | Al-Shabab | 27 | (2) |
| 2023–2025 | Abha | 41 | (9) |
| 2025–2026 | Neom | 36 | (10) |
- * Club domestic league appearances and goals as of 8 November 2025 ‡ National team caps and goals as of 24 January 2019

Ahmed Abdu Jaber (Tigrinya: ኣሕመድ ዓብዱ ጃበር, Arabic: أحمد عبده جابر, born 23 December 1993) is an Eritrean-Saudi Arabian professional footballer who plays as a striker.

== Career ==
On 5 July 2018, Abdu Jaber joined Al-Wehda. On 1 July 2022, Abdu Jaber joined Al-Shabab on a three-year deal. On 21 August 2023, Abdu Jaber joined Abha on a three-year deal. On 25 January 2025, Abdu Jaber joined Neom.
