= Sari Amro =

Saudi Arabian footballer (born 1989)

Personal information
- Full name: Sari Abdulraouf Amro
- Date of birth: November 15, 1989 (age 36)
- Place of birth: Macca, Saudi Arabia
- Height: 1.73 m (5 ft 8 in)
- Position: Left-back

Youth career
- Al-Wehda

Senior career*
Years	Team	Apps	(Gls)
2011–2015	Al-Wehda		
2015–2017	Al-Shabab	2	(0)
2016–2017	→ Al-Taawoun (loan)	7	(0)
2017–2020	Al-Wehda	38	(1)
2020–2023	Abha	66	(1)
2023–2024	Al-Arabi		
- * Club domestic league appearances and goals as of 9 September 2020

Sari Amro (Arabic: ساري عمرو; born 15 November 1989) is a professional Saudi Arabian football player who currently plays as a left back.

== Career ==
On 30 January 2020, Amro joined Abha on an eighteen-month contract. On 6 July 2021, Amro renewed his contract with Abha. On 12 September 2023, Amro joined Al-Arabi.

== Honours ==
Al-Wehda

- MS League: 2017–18
