= Al-Entesar Club =

Saudi Arabian association football team

Al-Entesar FC
- Full name: Al-Entesar Football Club
- Founded: 1978
- Ground: Al-Entesar Club Stadium; Rabigh, Makkah, Saudi Arabia
- Capacity: 2,000
- Chairman: Matar Al-Biladi
- Manager: Abdulaziz Hashlan
- League: Saudi Second Division
- 2024-25: Saudi Second Division, 9th (Group B)
Home colours	Away colours

Al-Entesar Football Club (often written Al-Entesar or Al-Intisar) is a community-based football club based in Rabigh, a coastal city in the Makkah Region of Saudi Arabia. Founded in the late 1970s (reported in local sources as 1398 AH). The club has developed into one of the better known teams and competes regularly in Saudi Second Division, the third tiers of the Saudi football league system. Al-Entesar’s identity is rooted in its local supporters, its sky-blue colours, and a focus on providing organized sport for young players in the surrounding area.

Home matches for Al-Entesar are played in Rabigh at the club’s own venue, commonly referred to as the Al-Entesar Club Stadium. Stadium capacity estimates vary roughly 1,000–5,000 seats. Like many regional clubs in Saudi Arabia, Al-Entesar faces the challenge of balancing ambition with resources. Infrastructure upgrades, sustained financial backing, and the ability to attract and retain higher-level coaching and playing talent remain ongoing concerns for smaller clubs. Nevertheless, Al-Entesar’s steady presence in the Second Division.

== Current squad ==
As of 2025-26

Note: Flags indicate national team as defined under FIFA eligibility rules; some limited exceptions apply. Players may hold more than one non-FIFA nationality.

No.	Pos.	Nation	Player
1	GK	KSA	Mohammed Kaaman
2	FW	KSA	Anas Al-Shanqiti
4	DF	KSA	Muteb Al-Mutairi
5	DF	KSA	Abdulrahman Al-Omari
6	MF	KSA	Ali Al-Talha
9	FW	KSA	Emad Al-Kenani
12	DF	KSA	Hassan Batayah
13	DF	KSA	Basil Al-Hedaif
14	DF	KSA	Naif Jathmi
16	MF	KSA	Abdullah Al-Mohammed
18	MF	KSA	Rafed Al-Muwallad
21	MF	KSA	Jameel Al-Muwallad
24	DF	KSA	Nasser Salami
25	DF	KSA	Abdullah Al-Ghamdi
29	GK	KSA	Bakr Eissa
44	DF	KSA	Fares Al-Balawi

No.	Pos.	Nation	Player
—	GK	KSA	Mohammed Babtain
—	DF	KSA	Saud Hadi
—	DF	KSA	Hussein Halawani
—	DF	KSA	Abdulaziz Majrashi
—	MF	KSA	Hashem Abdulsamad
—	MF	KSA	Sultan Safhi
—	MF	NGR	Ukeme Williams
—	MF	KSA	Rakan Al-Qahtani
—	MF	KSA	Hamed Fallatah
—	MF	BRA	Júninho
—	MF	KSA	Ibrahim Al-Sahari
—	MF	KSA	Thabet Al-Salhi
—	FW	KSA	Naif Al-Rehaili
—	FW	TAN	Edwin Balua
—	FW	CMR	Alain Akono
—	FW	KSA	Abdullah Khattab

== Notable players ==
- Abdoh Bernaoy

== See also ==
- List of football clubs in Saudi Arabia
