= 2019–20 Al-Adalah F.C. season =

Al-Adalah
2019–20 season
- President: Abdulaziz Al-Mudhey
- Manager: Skander Kasri (until 4 November); Nacif Beyaoui (from 5 November until 13 June); Giovanni Solinas (from 25 June)
- Stadium: Prince Abdullah bin Jalawi Stadium
- SPL: 16th (relegated)
- King Cup: Quarter-finals
- Top goalscorer: League: Carolus Andria (10); All: Carolus Andria (18)
- Highest home attendance: 15,304 vs Al-Ahli (1 February 2020)
- Lowest home attendance: 3,343 vs Al-Rawdhah (5 December 2019)
- Average home league attendance: 10,394
Home colours	Away colours	Third colours
- All statistics correct as of 9 September 2020.

The 2019–20 season was Al-Adalah's first ever season in the Pro League, the top flight of Saudi Arabian football, and their 36th season in existence. The club participated in the Pro League and the King Cup.

The season covered the period from 1 July 2019 to 9 September 2020.

== Players ==
=== Squad information ===
As of 1 February 2020

Note: Flags indicate national team as defined under FIFA eligibility rules; some limited exceptions apply. Players may hold more than one non-FIFA nationality.

No.	Pos.	Nation	Player
2	FW	MAD	Carolus Andria
3	MF	KSA	Hussain Al-Eisa
4	DF	KSA	Bader Al-Nakhli
5	DF	KSA	Murtadha Al-Burayh
6	MF	KSA	Ahmed Al-Sultan
7	MF	KSA	Ahmed Al-Nadhri
8	DF	KSA	Abdullah Al-Yousef
9	FW	KSA	Naif Hazazi
11	MF	KSA	Badr Al-Sulaitin
13	GK	KSA	Ali Al-Mazidi
14	DF	KSA	Khalid Al-Dubaysh (on loan from Al-Nassr)
15	MF	KSA	Abdullah Al-Humayan
16	MF	GRE	Savvas Gentsoglou
17	MF	KSA	Riyadh Sharahili
18	MF	MLI	Adama Traoré (on loan from FC Metz)

No.	Pos.	Nation	Player
20	DF	KSA	Waleed Al-Deeni
21	MF	EGY	Ahmed Mostafa
25	DF	SEN	Sy Ass Mandaw
26	MF	SEN	Aliou Cissé
27	MF	KSA	Montadhar Bo Hamoud
28	DF	KSA	Abdulaziz Majrashi
29	DF	KSA	Awadh Khrees (on loan from Al-Faisaly)
30	MF	NGA	John Ogu
42	DF	KSA	Radhi Al-Radhi
49	DF	KSA	Ali Al-Salem
50	GK	KSA	Mohammed Awaji (on loan from Al-Shabab)
55	MF	GAB	Medwin Biteghé
66	MF	KSA	Nader Al-Muwallad
73	GK	KSA	Mohammed Al-Moqahwi

=== Out on loan ===
Note: Flags indicate national team as defined under FIFA eligibility rules; some limited exceptions apply. Players may hold more than one non-FIFA nationality.

No.	Pos.	Nation	Player
10	MF	TUN	Youssef Fouzai (at Al-Ain until 30 June 2020)
12	DF	KSA	Hamad Al-Dawsari (at Al-Ain until 30 June 2020)

No.	Pos.	Nation	Player
24	DF	KSA	Haider Al-Ameri (at Al-Bukayriyah until 30 June 2020)
70	FW	KSA	Hussain Al-Jassem (at Al-Khaleej until 30 June 2020)

== Transfers and loans ==
=== Transfers in ===
Entry date	Position	No.	Player	From club	Fee	Ref.
9 June 2019	FW	19	(Chad) Maher Sharoma	(Saudi Arabia) Al-Khaleej	Free	
13 June 2019	DF	8	(Saudi Arabia) Abdullah Al-Yousef	(Saudi Arabia) Hajer	Free	
14 June 2019	MF	6	(Saudi Arabia) Ahmed Al-Sultan	(Saudi Arabia) Damac	Free	
24 June 2019	MF	7	(Saudi Arabia) Ahmed Al-Nadhri	(Saudi Arabia) Al-Fateh	Free	
26 June 2019	DF	23	(Algeria) Abdelaziz Guechi	(Algeria) MO Béjaïa	Free	
2 July 2019	GK	13	(Saudi Arabia) Ali Al-Mazidi	(Saudi Arabia) Al-Fateh	Free	
8 July 2019	MF	50	(Saudi Arabia) Morad Al-Rashidi	(Saudi Arabia) Al-Washm	Free	
12 July 2019	MF	17	(Saudi Arabia) Riyadh Sharahili	(Saudi Arabia) Al-Faisaly	Free	
18 July 2019	GK	99	(Tunisia) Aymen Mathlouthi	(Tunisia) Club Africain	Free	
24 July 2019	MF	55	(Gabon) Medwin Biteghé	(Tunisia) US Tataouine	Free	
30 July 2019	MF	26	(Senegal) Aliou Cissé	(Tunisia) CA Bizertin	Free	
8 August 2019	DF	25	(Senegal) Sy Ass Mandaw	(Saudi Arabia) Al-Ain	Free	
20 August 2019	DF	4	(Saudi Arabia) Bader Al-Nakhli	(Saudi Arabia) Al-Batin	Free	
28 August 2019	DF	28	(Saudi Arabia) Abdulaziz Majrashi	(Saudi Arabia) Al-Fayha	Free	
28 August 2019	MF	11	(Saudi Arabia) Badr Al-Sulaitin	(Saudi Arabia) Al-Raed	Free	
9 January 2020	MF	21	(Egypt) Ahmed Mostafa	(Saudi Arabia) Abha	Free	
10 January 2020	MF	30	(Nigeria) John Ogu	(Israel) Hapoel Be'er Sheva	Free	
26 January 2020	DF	20	(Saudi Arabia) Waleed Al-Deeni	(Saudi Arabia) Al-Entesar	Free	
29 January 2020	MF	16	(Greece) Savvas Gentsoglou	(Cyprus) APOEL	Undisclosed	
31 January 2020	FW	9	(Saudi Arabia) Naif Hazazi		Free	

=== Loans in ===
Start date	End date	Position	No.	Player	From club	Fee	Ref.
19 July 2019	End of season	DF	14	(Saudi Arabia) Khalid Al-Dubaysh	(Saudi Arabia) Al-Nassr	None	
30 August 2019	31 January 2020	FW	90	(Saudi Arabia) Khaled Al Gubaie	(Saudi Arabia) Al-Hilal	None	
31 August 2019	31 January 2020	MF	40	(Saudi Arabia) Hussain Al Hajoj	(Saudi Arabia) Al-Ittihad	None	
13 January 2020	End of season	DF	29	(Saudi Arabia) Awadh Khrees	(Saudi Arabia) Al-Faisaly	None	
18 January 2020	End of season	MF	18	(Mali) Adama Traoré	(France) FC Metz	None	
29 January 2020	End of season	GK	50	(Saudi Arabia) Mohammed Awaji	(Saudi Arabia) Al-Shabab	None	

=== Transfers out ===
Exit date	Position	No.	Player	To club	Fee	Ref.
14 June 2019	DF	21	(Nigeria) Abdulshakour Hosawi		Released	
14 June 2019	FW	88	(Sudan) Ahmed Farah		Released	
30 June 2019	GK	1	(Tunisia) Bilel Souissi		End of Contract	
30 June 2019	MF	29	(Senegal) Moctar Fall		End of Contract	
7 July 2019	DF	14	(Tunisia) Yassine Boufalgha	(Saudi Arabia) Al-Jeel	Free	
14 July 2019	MF	19	(Ivory Coast) Martial Yao	(United Arab Emirates) Al-Fujairah	Free	
21 July 2019	MF	77	(Saudi Arabia) Abdulrahman Al-Qarni	(Saudi Arabia) Al-Thoqbah	Free	
9 August 2019	GK	44	(Saudi Arabia) Ali Hubail	(Saudi Arabia) Al-Jubail	Free	
19 August 2019	FW	–	(Brazil) Leo Alves	(Saudi Arabia) Al-Safa	Free	
21 August 2019	MF	9	(Saudi Arabia) Abdullah Bo Homail	(Saudi Arabia) Hajer	Free	
30 August 2019	MF	17	(Saudi Arabia) Jassem Al-Eisa	(Saudi Arabia) Al-Jeel	Free	
12 January 2020	FW	19	(Chad) Maher Sharoma	(Saudi Arabia) Al-Ettifaq	Free	
21 January 2020	GK	99	(Tunisia) Aymen Mathlouthi		Released	

=== Loans out ===
Start date	End date	Position	No.	Player	To club	Fee	Ref.
8 January 2020	End of season	MF	10	(Tunisia) Youssef Fouzai	(Saudi Arabia) Al-Ain	None	
12 January 2020	End of season	DF	12	(Saudi Arabia) Hamad Al-Dawsari	(Saudi Arabia) Al-Ain	None	
15 January 2020	End of season	FW	70	(Saudi Arabia) Hussain Al-Jassem	(Saudi Arabia) Al-Khaleej	None	
25 January 2020	End of season	DF	24	(Saudi Arabia) Haider Al-Ameri	(Saudi Arabia) Al-Bukayriyah	None	

== Pre-season ==
18 July 2019 Friendly	Al-Adalah (Saudi Arabia)	1–1	(Saudi Arabia) Al-Jeel	Al-Hasa, Saudi Arabia
19:15 AST		Report		Stadium: Al-Jeel Club Stadium

24 July 2019 Friendly	Al-Adalah (Saudi Arabia)	0–4	(Tunisia) AS Soliman	Tunis, Tunisia
17:15 WAT		Report

27 July 2019 Friendly	Al-Adalah (Saudi Arabia)	0–0	(Saudi Arabia) Damac	Tunis, Tunisia
17:00 WAT		Report		Stadium: Stade Chedly Zouiten

1 August 2019 Friendly	Al-Adalah (Saudi Arabia)	3–3	(Tunisia) CS Chebba	Tunis, Tunisia
17:00 WAT	Al-Nadhri; Al-Radhi; Biteghé	Report

4 August 2019 Friendly	Al-Adalah (Saudi Arabia)	2–2	(Tunisia) CS Sfaxien	Sfax, Tunisia
17:00 WAT	Fouzai; Cissé	Report		Stadium: Stade Taïeb Mhiri

7 August 2019 Friendly	Al-Adalah (Saudi Arabia)	0–0	(Tunisia) US Monastir	Monastir, Tunisia
16:00 WAT		Report		Stadium: Stade Mustapha Ben Jannet

16 August 2019 Friendly	Al-Adalah (Saudi Arabia)	0–1	(Saudi Arabia) Al-Fateh	Al-Hasa, Saudi Arabia
18:50 AST			Jovanović 83'	Stadium: Al-Fateh Club Stadium

== Competitions ==
=== Overall ===
Competition	Started round	Final position / round	First match	Last match
Pro League	—	16th	22 August 2019	9 September 2020
King Cup	Round of 64	Quarter-finals	9 November 2019	17 January 2020

Updated to match played 9 September 2020
Source: Competitions

=== Overview ===
Competition	Record							
Competition	G	W	D	L	GF	GA	GD	Win %
Pro League	30	4	9	17	27	62	−35	13.33
King Cup	4	3	0	1	12	2	+10	75.00
Total	34	7	9	18	39	64	−25	20.59

Updated to match played 9 September 2020
Source: Competitions

=== Pro League ===
==== League table ====
Pos	Team	Pld	W	D	L	GF	GA	GD	Pts	Qualification or relegation
12	Al-Taawoun	30	10	5	15	33	40	−7	35 (Note: Positions determined by head-to-head points: Damac: 9 pts; Al-Ittihad: 6 pts; Al-Taawoun: 3 pts.)	
13	Al-Fateh	30	8	9	13	42	49	−7	33	
14	Al-Fayha (R)	30	8	8	14	34	44	−10	32	Relegation to Prince Mohammad bin Salman League
15	Al-Hazem (R)	30	7	6	17	40	61	−21	27	Relegation to Prince Mohammad bin Salman League
16	Al-Adalah (R)	30	4	9	17	27	62	−35	21	Relegation to Prince Mohammad bin Salman League

Updated to match(es) played on 9 September 2020. Source: spl.com
Rules for classification: 1) Points; 2) Head-to-head points; 3) Head-to-head goal difference; 4) Total goal difference; 5) Total goals scored; 6) Fair-play points (Note: Head-to-head record is used only after all the matches between the teams in question have been played).
(R) Relegated

==== Results summary ====
Overall								Home						Away					
Pld	W	D	L	GF	GA	GD	Pts	W	D	L	GF	GA	GD	W	D	L	GF	GA	GD
30	4	9	17	27	62	−35	21	2	5	8	16	28	−12	2	4	9	11	34	−23

Last updated: 9 September 2020.

==== Results by round ====
Round	1	2	3	4	5	6	7	8	9	10	11	12	13	14	15	16	17	18	19	20	21	22	23	24	25	26	27	28	29	30
Ground	A	H	A	H	A	H	H	A	H	A	A	H	A	H	A	H	A	H	A	H	A	A	H	A	H	H	A	H	A	H
Result	D	W	L	W	L	L	L	L	D	L	L	L	L	D	D	D	D	D	D	L	L	W	L	W	L	L	L	D	L	L
Position	9	3	7	3	6	9	10	14	14	14	14	14	15	15	15	14	14	15	15	16	16	16	16	16	16	16	16	16	16	16

Updated to match(es) played on 9 September 2020. Source:
A = Away; H = Home; W = Win; D = Draw; L = Loss

==== Matches ====
All times are local, AST (UTC+3).

Win Draw Loss Postponed

22 August 2019 1	Al-Ahli	1–1	Al-Adalah	Jeddah
20:50	Abdulghani (yellow card) 19'; Aleksić 45+4'; Zukanović (yellow card) 67'	Report	Al-Burayh (yellow card) 31'; Biteghé (yellow card) 55'; Cissé 88'	Stadium: King Abdullah Sports City; Attendance: 7,544; Referee: Bakary Gassama (Gambia)

29 August 2019 2	Al-Adalah	4–0	Damac	Al-Hasa
18:45	Biteghé 13'; Cissé 40'; Andriamatsinoro 45+2' (pen.); Al-Sultan (yellow card) 77'; Al-Eisa 82'	Report	Al-Safri (yellow card) 46'	Stadium: Prince Abdullah bin Jalawi Stadium; Attendance: 11,922; Referee: Danny Makkelie (Netherlands)

13 September 2019 3	Al-Taawoun	3–2	Al-Adalah	Buraidah
18:50	Al-Absi 31'; Amissi (yellow card) 54'; Petrolina 70'; Al-Muwallad 84'	Report	Al-Burayh (yellow card) 29'; Cissé 39'; Andriamatsinoro 45+3'; Al-Radhi (yellow card) 56'	Stadium: King Abdullah Sport City Stadium; Attendance: 2,119; Referee: Bas Nijhuis (Netherlands)

20 September 2019 4	Al-Adalah	2–1	Abha	Al-Hasa
18:20	Cissé 4'; Andriamatsinoro 48', (yellow card) 84'; Al-Burayh (yellow card) 57'; Al-Radhi (yellow card) 86'; Al-Eisa (yellow card) 89'	Report	Al Abbas 30'; Atouchi (yellow card) 45+3'; Al-Habib (yellow card) 90+3'	Stadium: Prince Abdullah bin Jalawi Stadium; Attendance: 12,640; Referee: Damir Skomina (Slovenia)

28 September 2019 5	Al-Faisaly	3–1	Al-Adalah	Al Majma'ah
18:30	Rossi 47'; El Jebli (yellow card) 50'; William 88'; Luisinho 90+4'	Report	Biteghé (yellow card) 24'; Al-Yousef 33'; Al-Muwallad (yellow card) 90+3'	Stadium: Al Majma'ah Sports City; Attendance: 5,600; Referee: Ovidiu Hațegan (Romania)

5 October 2019 6	Al-Adalah	0–1	Al-Shabab	Al-Hasa
18:05	Al-Muwallad (yellow card) 42'; Cissé (yellow card) 82'; Al-Yousef (yellow card) 90+1'	Report	Al-Hamdan (yellow card) 10'; Sebá (yellow card) 45', (goal) 63'; Benlamri (yellow card) 72'	Stadium: Prince Abdullah bin Jalawi Stadium; Attendance: 5,441; Referee: Siemen Mulder (Netherlands)

18 October 2019 7	Al-Adalah	3–5	Al-Fateh	Al-Hasa
17:50	Al-Humayan (red card) 28'; Al-Burayh (yellow card) 45+5'; Al-Eisa 83'; Andriamatsinoro 87', 90+5'	Report	Janota 4'; Lajami (yellow card) 36'; Wikheim 41' te Vrede 43', 85'; Saâdane 45+6' (pen.); Buhimed (yellow card) 60'	Stadium: Prince Abdullah bin Jalawi Stadium; Attendance: 5,915; Referee: Bakary Gassama (Gambia)

24 October 2019 8	Al-Ettifaq	1–0	Al-Adalah	Dammam
17:45	Kiss 70'	Report		Stadium: Prince Mohamed bin Fahd Stadium; Attendance: 10,085; Referee: Svein Oddvar Moen (Norway)

2 November 2019 9	Al-Adalah	2–2	Al-Hazem	Al-Hasa
17:40	Cissé (yellow card) 27'; Andriamatsinoro 59', 71'; Al-Radhi (yellow card) 64'; Al-Dawsari (yellow card) 85'	Report	Al-Nashi (yellow card) 18'; Tandia 22', (yellow card) 44'; Al-Habib (yellow card) 66'; Al-Khalaf (yellow card) 78'; Al-Zubaidi 90+3'	Stadium: Prince Abdullah bin Jalawi Stadium; Attendance: 8,134; Referee: Igor Pajac (Croatia)

12 December 2019 11	Al-Wehda	2–0	Al-Adalah	Mecca
19:45	Anselmo 43'; Al-Sqoor (yellow card) 45'; Renato 63', (yellow card) 83'	Report	Cissé (yellow card) 35'; Guechi (yellow card) 63'; Sharahili (yellow card) 90+4'	Stadium: King Abdul Aziz Stadium; Attendance: 4,750; Referee: Pawel Raczkowski (Poland)

19 December 2019 12	Al-Adalah	0–3	Al-Nassr	Al-Hasa
17:35	Al-Burayh (yellow card) 26'; Al-Ameri (yellow card) 58'; Al-Radhi (yellow card) 87'	Report	Amrabat 16'; Giuliano 43'; Musa (yellow card) 68'; Petros 83'	Stadium: Prince Abdullah bin Jalawi Stadium; Attendance: 9,299; Referee: Tamás Bognár (Hungary)

26 December 2019 13	Al-Raed	1–0	Al-Adalah	Buraidah
17:55	Djoum 17'; Al-Farhan (yellow card) 24'; Daoudi (yellow card) 45+1'; Doukha (yellow card) 50'	Report	Al-Radhi (yellow card) 19'; Al Salem (yellow card) 21'; Al-Muwallad (yellow card) 44'	Stadium: King Abdullah Sport City Stadium; Attendance: 2,980; Referee: Kevin Blom (Netherlands)

30 December 2019 10	Al-Hilal	7–0	Al-Adalah	Riyadh
17:55	Al-Abed 15'; Gomis 28', 40', 57'; Giovinco 34'; Al-Shehri 84'; Carrillo 90'	Report	Al-Burayh (yellow card) 39'	Stadium: King Saud University Stadium; Attendance: 15,631; Referee: Ivan Kružliak (Slovakia)

9 January 2020 14	Al-Adalah	1–1	Al-Fayha	Al-Hasa
17:45	Andria (yellow card) 41'; Cissé 65'; Al-Burayh (yellow card) 68'; Mathlouthi (yellow card) 90+2'	Report	Neto (yellow card) 75'; Fernández (yellow card) 89'; Al-Sobhi 90+2'	Stadium: Prince Abdullah bin Jalawi Stadium; Attendance: 9,315; Referee: Matej Jug (Slovenia)

25 January 2020 15	Al-Ittihad	0–0	Al-Adalah	Jeddah
20:10	Jonas (yellow card) 35'; Uvini (yellow card) 45'; Romarinho (yellow card) 47'; Gil (yellow card) 90+7'	Report	Al-Sultan (yellow card) 17'; Sharahili (yellow card) 80'; Al-Humayan (yellow card) 86'; Al-Yousef (yellow card) 90+3'	Stadium: King Abdullah Sports City; Attendance: 16,912; Referee: Matthew Conger (New Zealand)

1 February 2020 16	Al-Adalah	1–1	Al-Ahli	Al-Hasa
15:25	Biteghé 30', (yellow card) 84'; Andria (yellow card) 51'; Mandaw (yellow card) 84'	Report	Al-Khabrani (yellow card) 18'; Al-Moasher 38'; Lucas Lima (red card) 84'	Stadium: Prince Abdullah bin Jalawi Stadium; Attendance: 15,304; Referee: Allard Lindhout (Netherlands)

5 February 2020 17	Damac	1–1	Al-Adalah	Abha
16:00	Chenihi 49'; Ilyas (yellow card) 74'; Zeghba (yellow card) 77'	Report	Cissé (yellow card) 31'; Al-Yousef (yellow card) 65' (yellow-red card) 90+4'; Andria 78' (pen.); Al-Sultan (yellow card) 79'; Mostafa (yellow card) 83'	Stadium: Prince Sultan bin Abdul Aziz Stadium; Attendance: 5,921; Referee: Mario Zebec (Croatia)

14 February 2020 18	Al-Adalah	0–0	Al-Taawoun	Al-Hasa
15:30	Ogu (yellow card) 44'	Report	Barnawi (yellow card) 57'	Stadium: Prince Abdullah bin Jalawi Stadium; Attendance: 12,819; Referee: Majed Al-Shamrani

21 February 2020 19	Abha	2–2	Al-Adalah	Abha
16:10	Al-Najar 7'; Bguir 28'; Boukhenchouche (yellow card) 48'	Report	Traoré 13'; Cissé 48'; Gentsoglou (yellow card) 90+1'	Stadium: Prince Sultan bin Abdul Aziz Stadium; Attendance: 1,972; Referee: Khaled Al-Teris

28 February 2020 20	Al-Adalah	0–2	Al-Faisaly	Al-Hasa
18:20	Ogu (yellow card) 55'; Cissé (yellow card) 59'; Khrees (yellow card) 65' (yellow-red card) 71'; Traoré (yellow card) 90+5'	Report	Hyland 18'; Al-Saiari (red card) 77'; El Jebli 90+16'	Stadium: Prince Abdullah bin Jalawi Stadium; Attendance: 13,147; Referee: Ivan Bebek (Croatia)

5 March 2020 21	Al-Shabab	4–0	Al-Adalah	Riyadh
20:40	Guanca 39'; Al-Sulayhem 45+4'; Al-Hamdan 72'; Al-Ammar 87', (yellow card) 89'	Report	Ogu (red card) 23'; Gentsoglou (yellow card) 63'; Al-Yousef (yellow card) 64'; Al-Sultan (yellow card) 65'	Stadium: Prince Faisal bin Fahd Stadium; Attendance: 4,144; Referee: Majed Al-Shamrani

12 March 2020 22	Al-Fateh	0–1	Al-Adalah	Al-Hasa
20:40	Wikheim (yellow card) 85'	Report	Al-Yousef 5' (pen.); Al-Mazidi (yellow card) 40'; Traoré (yellow card) 86'; Al-Burayh (yellow card) 90+2'	Stadium: Prince Abdullah bin Jalawi Stadium; Attendance: 0 (Note: Matches from 7 March and onwards will be played behind closed doors due to concerns over the coronavirus outbreak.); Referee: Aleksei Kulbakov (Belarus)

5 August 2020 23	Al-Adalah	0–1	Al-Ettifaq	Al-Hasa
20:30	Gentsoglou (yellow card) 18'	Report	Al-Robeai 38'; Souza (yellow card) 90+1'	Stadium: Prince Abdullah bin Jalawi Stadium; Attendance: 0 Referee: Georgi Kabakov (Bulgaria)

10 August 2020 24	Al-Hazem	1–2	Al-Adalah	Ar Rass
19:20	Strandberg 24'; Fettouhi (yellow card) 27'; Al-Shammari (yellow card) 67'	Report	Khrees (yellow card) 45+1'; Andriamatsinoro 64'; Gentsoglou (yellow card) 73'; Sharahili 75'	Stadium: Al-Hazem Club Stadium; Attendance: 0 Referee: Kristo Tohver (Estonia)

15 August 2020 25	Al-Adalah	0–4	Al-Hilal	Al-Hasa
18:55	Al-Sultan (yellow card) 60'; Al-Radhi (red card) 90+1'	Report	Gomis 30', 75'; Giovinco (yellow card) 42'; Al-Dawsari (yellow card) 52', (goal) 79'; Kharbin 90+2'	Stadium: Prince Abdullah bin Jalawi Stadium; Attendance: 0 Referee: Mattias Gestranius (Finland)

20 August 2020 26	Al-Adalah	2–4	Al-Wehda	Al-Hasa
18:50	Gentsoglou 8' (pen.); Khrees (yellow card) 40'; Al-Yousef (yellow card) 49'; Hazazi 53'; Majrashi (yellow card) 90+6'	Report	Anselmo 11', 51'; Niakaté 25', 81'; Botía (yellow card) 27'; Luisinho (yellow card) 66'; Al-Qarni (yellow card) 71'	Stadium: Prince Abdullah bin Jalawi Stadium; Attendance: 0 Referee: Matthew Conger (New Zealand)

25 August 2020 27	Al-Nassr	6–1	Al-Adalah	Riyadh
20:50	Hamdallah 14', 45+4'; Giuliano 17', 43'; Musa 28'; Ali (yellow card) 57'; Maicon (yellow card) 71'; Az. Al-Dawsari 90+2'	Report	Andriamatsinoro 13'; Al-Dubaysh (red card) 22'	Stadium: King Fahd International Stadium; Attendance: 0 Referee: Andris Treimanis (Latvia)

29 August 2020 28	Al-Adalah	1–1	Al-Raed	Al-Hasa
18:40	Gentsoglou (yellow card) 26'; Al-Yousef (yellow card) 28'; Hazazi (yellow card) 53', (goal) 90+1'; Majrashi (yellow card) 75'; Al-Sultan (yellow card) 81'	Report	Fouzair (yellow card) 52'; Al-Farhan (yellow card) 60'; Daoudi 76'; Al-Showaish (yellow card) 90+5'	Stadium: Prince Abdullah bin Jalawi Stadium; Attendance: 0 Referee: Bobby Madden (Scotland)

4 September 2020 29	Al-Fayha	2–0	Al-Adalah	Al Majma'ah
20:35	Al-Mazidi 16' (o.g.); Owusu 56'; Neto (yellow card) 70'	Report	Al-Nakhli (yellow card) 45+4'; Al-Eisa (yellow card) 45+4'; Al-Yousef (yellow card) 72'; Traoré (yellow card) 73'	Stadium: Al Majma'ah Sports City; Attendance: 0 Referee: Matthew Conger (New Zealand)

9 September 2020 30	Al-Adalah	0–2	Al-Ittihad	Al-Hasa
20:35	Mandaw (yellow card) 7'	Report	Al-Muwallad 11'; Bony 28' (pen.); Abdulhamid (yellow card) 31'	Stadium: Prince Abdullah bin Jalawi Stadium; Attendance: 0 Referee: Khaled Al-Teris

=== King Cup ===
All times are local, AST (UTC+3).

9 November 2019 Round of 64	Al-Jubail	1–2 (a.e.t.)	Al-Adalah	Jubail
15:15	Kechrid 8'; Hubail (yellow card) 94'	Report	Andria 23', 96'	Stadium: Al-Jubail Club Stadium; Referee: Sultan Okairi

5 December 2019 Round of 32	Al-Adalah	8–0	Al-Rawdhah	Al-Hasa
14:55	Andria 2', 32', 34', 45', 60'; Al-Qasimi 47' (o.g.); Al-Nadhri 52'; Al-Eisa 77'	Report	Al-Nufaili (yellow card) 18'	Stadium: Prince Abdullah bin Jalawi Stadium; Attendance: 3,343; Referee: Khaled Salwi

4 January 2020 Round of 16	Al-Adalah	2–0	Al-Shoulla	Al-Hasa
15:05	Cissé (yellow card) 13'; Mandaw 15'; Andria 29', (yellow card) 29'; Al-Sultan (yellow card) 38'; Al-Hajoj (yellow card) 64'; Al Gubaie (yellow card) 70'	Report	Al-Bishi (yellow card) 9'; Daouda (yellow card) 56'; Tamihi (yellow card) 60'; Gharsellaoui (yellow card) 90+4'	Stadium: Prince Abdullah bin Jalawi Stadium; Referee: Viktor Kassai (Hungary)

17 January 2020 Quarter-finals	Al-Adalah	0–1	Al-Nassr	Al-Hasa
17:55	Al-Sultan (yellow card) 21'; Andria (yellow card) 74'	Report	Giuliano (yellow card) 26'; Hamdallah 51'; Al-Dossari (yellow card) 68'	Stadium: Prince Abdullah bin Jalawi Stadium; Attendance: 9,669; Referee: Aleksei Kulbakov (Belarus)

== Statistics ==
=== Appearances ===
Last updated on 9 September 2020.

No.	Pos	Nat	Player	Total		Pro League		King Cup	
No.	Pos	Nat	Player	Apps	Goals	Apps	Goals	Apps	Goals
Goalkeepers
13	GK	(Saudi Arabia) KSA	Ali Al-Mazidi	19	0	18	0	1	0
50	GK	(Saudi Arabia) KSA	Mohammed Awaji	0	0	0	0	0	0
73	GK	(Saudi Arabia) KSA	Mohammed Al-Moqahwi	3	0	2+1	0	0	0
Defenders
4	DF	(Saudi Arabia) KSA	Bader Al-Nakhli	10	0	8+2	0	0	0
5	DF	(Saudi Arabia) KSA	Murtadha Al-Burayh	19	0	15+2	0	2	0
8	DF	(Saudi Arabia) KSA	Abdullah Al-Yousef	22	2	20+1	2	1	0
14	DF	(Saudi Arabia) KSA	Khalid Al-Dubaysh	7	0	4+2	0	1	0
25	DF	(Senegal) SEN	Sy Ass Mandaw	17	1	13+1	0	3	1
28	DF	(Saudi Arabia) KSA	Abdulaziz Majrashi	13	0	7+4	0	2	0
29	DF	(Saudi Arabia) KSA	Awadh Khrees	10	0	8+1	0	1	0
42	DF	(Saudi Arabia) KSA	Radhi Al-Radhi	18	0	16	0	2	0
49	DF	(Saudi Arabia) KSA	Ali Al-Salem	8	0	3+2	0	2+1	0
Midfielders
3	MF	(Saudi Arabia) KSA	Hussain Al-Eisa	21	3	9+11	2	1	1
6	MF	(Saudi Arabia) KSA	Ahmed Al-Sultan	22	0	14+5	0	2+1	0
7	MF	(Saudi Arabia) KSA	Ahmed Al-Nadhri	23	1	10+11	0	1+1	1
11	MF	(Saudi Arabia) KSA	Badr Al-Sulaitin	15	0	3+10	0	0+2	0
15	MF	(Saudi Arabia) KSA	Abdullah Al-Humayan	11	0	4+6	0	0+1	0
16	MF	(Greece) GRE	Savvas Gentsoglou	13	1	13	1	0	0
17	MF	(Saudi Arabia) KSA	Riyadh Sharahili	20	1	8+8	1	3+1	0
18	MF	(Mali) MLI	Adama Traoré	16	1	16	1	0	0
21	MF	(Egypt) EGY	Ahmed Mostafa	6	0	4+1	0	0+1	0
26	MF	(Senegal) SEN	Aliou Cissé	30	6	22+4	6	4	0
27	MF	(Saudi Arabia) KSA	Montathar Bo Hamoud	0	0	0	0	0	0
30	MF	(Nigeria) NGA	John Ogu	8	0	7	0	1	0
55	MF	(Gabon) GAB	Medwin Biteghé	33	2	28+2	2	3	0
66	MF	(Saudi Arabia) KSA	Nader Al-Muwallad	17	0	11+5	0	1	0
Forwards
2	FW	(Madagascar) MAD	Carolus Andriamatsinoro	34	18	29+1	10	4	8
9	FW	(Saudi Arabia) KSA	Naif Hazazi	10	2	4+6	2	0	0
Players sent out on loan this season
10	MF	(Tunisia) TUN	Youssef Fouzai	13	0	9+2	0	1+1	0
12	DF	(Saudi Arabia) KSA	Hamad Al-Dawsari	6	0	3+1	0	1+1	0
24	DF	(Saudi Arabia) KSA	Haider Al-Ameri	2	0	0+1	0	1	0
70	FW	(Saudi Arabia) KSA	Hussain Al-Jassem	1	0	0+1	0	0	0
Player who made an appearance this season but have left the club
19	FW	(Chad) CHA	Maher Sharoma	1	0	0+1	0	0	0
23	DF	(Algeria) ALG	Abdelaziz Guechi	12	0	11	0	1	0
40	MF	(Saudi Arabia) KSA	Hussain Al Hajoj	10	0	1+6	0	2+1	0
90	FW	(Saudi Arabia) KSA	Khaled Al Gubaie	3	0	0+1	0	0+2	0
99	GK	(Tunisia) TUN	Aymen Mathlouthi	13	0	10	0	3	0

=== Goalscorers ===
Rank	No.	Pos	Nat	Name	Pro League	King Cup	Total
1	2	FW	(Madagascar)	Carolus Andriamatsinoro	10	8	18
2	26	MF	(Senegal)	Aliou Cissé	6	0	6
3	3	MF	(Saudi Arabia)	Hussain Al-Eisa	2	1	3
4	8	DF	(Saudi Arabia)	Abdullah Al-Yousef	2	0	2
4	9	FW	(Saudi Arabia)	Naif Hazazi	2	0	2
4	55	MF	(Gabon)	Medwin Biteghé	2	0	2
7	7	MF	(Saudi Arabia)	Ahmed Al-Nadhri	0	1	1
7	16	MF	(Greece)	Savvas Gentsoglou	1	0	1
7	17	MF	(Saudi Arabia)	Riyadh Sharahili	1	0	1
7	18	MF	(Mali)	Adama Traoré	1	0	1
7	25	DF	(Senegal)	Sy Ass Mandaw	0	1	1
Own goal					0	1	0
Total					27	12	39

Last Updated: 29 August 2020

=== Clean sheets ===
Rank	No.	Pos	Nat	Name	Pro League	King Cup	Total
1	13	GK	(Saudi Arabia)	Ali Al-Mazidi	3	0	3
1	99	GK	(Tunisia)	Aymen Mathlouthi	1	2	3
Total					4	2	6

Last Updated: 12 March 2020
