= 2018–19 Al-Fateh SC season =

Al-Fateh
2018–19 season
- Chairman: Saad Al-Afaliq
- Manager: Fathi Al-Jabal
- Stadium: Prince Abdullah bin Jalawi Stadium
- Pro League: 9th
- King Cup: Round of 32 (knocked out by Al-Qaisumah)
- Top goalscorer: League: Abdelkader Oueslati (6); All: Abdelkader Oueslati (6)
- Highest home attendance: 9,050 (vs. Al-Hilal, 24 September 2018)
- Lowest home attendance: 250 (vs. Al-Raed, 16 May 2019)
- Average home league attendance: 3,427
Home colours	Away colours
- All statistics correct as of 16 May 2019.

The 2018–19 season was Al-Fateh's 10th consecutive season in the Pro League and their 61st year in existence. The club participated in the Pro League and the King Cup.

The season covered the period from 1 July 2018 to 30 June 2019.

== Players ==
=== Squad information ===
As of 1 February 2019

Note: Flags indicate national team as defined under FIFA eligibility rules; some limited exceptions apply. Players may hold more than one non-FIFA nationality.

No.	Pos.	Nation	Player
1	GK	KSA	Basil Al-Bahrani
3	DF	KSA	Jamaan Al-Dossari
4	DF	ALG	Mohamed Naâmani
5	DF	KSA	Amjad Al-Meihan
7	MF	KSA	Ahmed Al-Nadhri
8	MF	BLR	Nikita Korzun (on loan from Dynamo Kyiv)
9	FW	KSA	Hamad Al-Juahaim
10	MF	TUN	Abdelkader Oueslati
11	FW	SRB	Saša Jovanović
12	GK	KSA	Ali Al-Mazidi
14	MF	KSA	Mohammed Al-Fuhaid (captain)
15	MF	KSA	Mansor Hamzi
16	MF	KSA	Munther Al-Nakhli
17	DF	URU	Matías Aguirregaray (on loan from Tijuana)

No.	Pos.	Nation	Player
19	DF	KSA	Nawaf Boushal
21	MF	KSA	Ali Al-Hassan
23	DF	KSA	Abdullah Al-Yousef
24	MF	ALG	Ibrahim Chenihi
26	MF	KSA	Ali Al-Zaqaan
29	MF	KSA	Mohammed Al-Majhad
33	DF	KSA	Yassin Hamzah
34	GK	KSA	Habib Al-Wotayan
35	GK	UKR	Maksym Koval (on loan from Dynamo Kyiv)
38	MF	KSA	Ammar Al-Najjar (on loan from Al-Ittihad)
49	MF	KSA	Salem Al Najrani
77	MF	KSA	Ibrahim Al-Telhi
78	DF	KSA	Ali Lajami
90	FW	BRA	João Pedro

=== Out on loan ===
Note: Flags indicate national team as defined under FIFA eligibility rules; some limited exceptions apply. Players may hold more than one non-FIFA nationality.

No.	Pos.	Nation	Player
18	MF	KSA	Mohammed Al-Saeed (at Al-Adalah until 30 June 2019)
—	MF	ZAM	Saith Sakala (at Al-Tai until 30 June 2019)

No.	Pos.	Nation	Player
—	FW	KSA	Abdullah Al-Bladi (at Al-Washm until 30 June 2019)

== Transfers ==
=== In ===
Date	Pos.	Name	Previous club	Fee	Source
30 May 2018	MF	(Saudi Arabia) Nooh Al-Mousa	(Spain) Real Valladolid	End of loan	
30 May 2018	FW	(Saudi Arabia) Abdullah Al-Bladi	(Saudi Arabia) Al-Nojoom	End of loan	
6 June 2018	DF	(Saudi Arabia) Yassin Hamzah	(Saudi Arabia) Al-Ittihad	Free	
18 June 2018	MF	(Saudi Arabia) Abdulaziz Al-Sharid	(Saudi Arabia) Al-Taawoun	Free	
21 June 2018	MF	(Saudi Arabia) Mansor Hamzi	(Saudi Arabia) Al-Faisaly	Free	
26 June 2018	DF	(Algeria) Mohamed Naâmani	(Algeria) CR Belouizdad	Free	
7 July 2018	MF	(Democratic Republic of the Congo) Nzuzi Toko	(Switzerland) St. Gallen	Free	
1 August 2018	MF	(Guinea) Alkhaly Bangoura	(Tunisia) ES Sahel	€700,000	
14 August 2018	MF	(Saudi Arabia) Ahmed Al-Nadhri	(Saudi Arabia) Al-Ittihad	Free	
23 August 2018	DF	(Saudi Arabia) Sultan Al-Deayea	(Saudi Arabia) Al-Faisaly	Free	
23 August 2018	DF	(Saudi Arabia) Ali Lajami	(Saudi Arabia) Al-Khaleej	Undisclosed	
22 October 2018	MF	(Saudi Arabia) Ibrahim Al-Telhi	(Saudi Arabia) Najran	Free	
13 January 2019	DF	(Saudi Arabia) Jamaan Al-Dossari	(Saudi Arabia) Al-Faisaly	Free	
24 January 2019	FW	(Serbia) Saša Jovanović	(Spain) Córdoba	€500,000	

=== Loans in ===
Date	Pos.	Name	Parent club	End date	Source
24 July 2018	GK	(Ukraine) Maksym Koval	(Ukraine) Dynamo Kyiv	End of season	
12 August 2018	DF	(Uruguay) Matías Aguirregaray	(Mexico) Tijuana	End of season	
18 January 2019	MF	(Saudi Arabia) Ammar Al-Najjar	(Saudi Arabia) Al-Fateh	End of season	
24 January 2019	MF	(Belarus) Nikita Korzun	(Ukraine) Dynamo Kyiv	End of season	

=== Out ===
Date	Pos.	Name	New club	Fee	Source
3 May 2018	GK	(Saudi Arabia) Abdullah Al-Owaishir	(Saudi Arabia) Al-Nassr	Free	
30 May 2018	DF	(Egypt) Mohamed Abdel Shafy	(Saudi Arabia) Al-Ahli	End of loan	
30 May 2018	DF	(Saudi Arabia) Abdulaziz Majrashi	(Saudi Arabia) Al-Fayha	End of loan	
30 May 2018	DF	(Saudi Arabia) Ahmed Sharahili	(Saudi Arabia) Al-Hilal	End of loan	
30 May 2018	MF	(Saudi Arabia) Ahmed Al-Nadhri	(Saudi Arabia) Al-Ittihad	End of loan	
30 May 2018	MF	(Brazil) Sandro Manoel	(Saudi Arabia) Al-Taawoun	End of loan	
18 June 2018	MF	(Saudi Arabia) Nooh Al-Mousa	(Saudi Arabia) Al-Ahli	Undisclosed	
10 July 2018	MF	(Saudi Arabia) Riyadh Sharahili	(Saudi Arabia) Al-Tai	Free	
31 July 2018	MF	(Saudi Arabia) Abdullah Al-Dawsari	(Saudi Arabia) Al-Washm	Free	
24 August 2018	FW	(Saudi Arabia) Ibrahim Belharth	(Saudi Arabia) Najran	Free	
31 August 2018	DF	(Saudi Arabia) Saleh Al-Nashmi	(Saudi Arabia) Al-Thoqbah	Free	
31 August 2018	FW	(Saudi Arabia) Hussain Al-Jassem	(Saudi Arabia) Al-Adalah	Free	
3 January 2019	DF	(Saudi Arabia) Abdullah Al-Ammar	(Saudi Arabia) Al-Ittihad	Undisclosed	
7 January 2019	DF	(Saudi Arabia) Majed Hazazi	(Saudi Arabia) Ohod	Free	
13 January 2019	DF	(Saudi Arabia) Sultan Al-Deayea	Released		
30 January 2019	MF	(Saudi Arabia) Abdulaziz Al-Sharid	(Saudi Arabia) Al-Ain	Free	
14 March 2019	MF	(Democratic Republic of the Congo) Nzuzi Toko	(Sweden) IFK Göteborg	Free	

=== Loans out ===
Date	Pos.	Name	Subsequent club	End date	Source
12 July 2018	FW	(Saudi Arabia) Abdullah Al-Bladi	(Saudi Arabia) Al-Washm	Loan return	
26 July 2018	MF	(Saudi Arabia) Ali Al-Zaqaan	(Saudi Arabia) Al-Ittihad	3 January 2019	
28 August 2018	MF	(Zambia) Saith Sakala	(Saudi Arabia) Al-Nojoom	18 January 2019	
18 January 2019	MF	(Zambia) Saith Sakala	(Saudi Arabia) Al-Tai	End of season	
5 February 2019	MF	(Saudi Arabia) Mohammed Al-Saeed	(Saudi Arabia) Al-Adalah	End of season	

== Competitions ==
=== Overall ===
Competition	Started round	Current position / round	Final position / round	First match	Last match
Pro League	—	—	9th	31 August 2018	16 May 2019
King Cup	Round of 64	—	Round of 32	1 January 2019	17 January 2019

Last Updated: 16 May 2019

=== Pro League ===
==== League table ====
Pos	Team	Pld	W	D	L	GF	GA	GD	Pts	Qualification or relegation
7	Al-Wehda	30	12	6	12	41	41	0	42	
8	Al-Raed	30	10	8	12	38	48	−10	38	
9	Al-Fateh	30	8	11	11	32	45	−13	35	
10	Al-Ittihad	30	9	7	14	44	45	−1	34	Qualification for Arab Club Champions Cup
11	Al-Ettifaq	30	8	9	13	40	55	−15	33	

Source: spl.com
Rules for classification: 1) Points; 2) Head-to-head points; 3) Head-to-head goal difference; 4) Total goal difference; 5) Total goals scored; 6) Play-off (only for deciding champion, relegation and AFC competitions participation).

==== Results summary ====
Overall								Home						Away					
Pld	W	D	L	GF	GA	GD	Pts	W	D	L	GF	GA	GD	W	D	L	GF	GA	GD
30	8	11	11	32	45	−13	35	6	4	5	18	17	+1	2	7	6	14	28	−14

Last updated: 16 May 2019.
Source: Competitive matches

==== Results by round ====
Round	1	2	3	4	5	6	7	8	9	10	11	12	13	14	15	16	17	18	19	20	21	22	23	24	25	26	27	28	29	30
Ground	A	H	A	H	H	A	A	H	A	H	H	H	H	H	H	A	H	A	H	A	H	A	H	A	A	A	A	A	A	H
Result	D	D	D	L	W	W	L	L	D	W	L	W	D	D	D	L	W	L	W	W	W	D	L	D	L	D	D	L	L	L
Position	10	9	10	11	8	7	8	9	9	8	9	7	8	10	11	11	9	11	8	7	7	7	7	8	8	8	8	8	8	9

Updated to match(es) played on 16 May 2019. Source: Competitive matches
A = Away; H = Home; W = Win; D = Draw; L = Loss

==== Matches ====
All times are local, AST (UTC+3).

Win Draw Loss Postponed

31 August 2018 1	Al-Qadsiah	0–0	Al-Fateh	Khobar
18:40		Report		Stadium: Prince Saud bin Jalawi Stadium; Attendance: 1,637; Referee: Mark Clattenburg (England)

13 September 2018 2	Al-Fateh	0–0	Al-Wehda	Al-Hasa
18:30	Al-Fuhaid (yellow card) 88'; Lajami (yellow card) 90+3'	Report	Renato Chaves (yellow card) 29'; Anselmo (yellow card) 71'; Darwish (yellow card) 90+1'	Stadium: Prince Abdullah bin Jalawi Stadium; Attendance: 1,437; Referee: Anastasios Sidiropoulos (Greece)

20 September 2018 3	Al-Shabab	1–1	Al-Fateh	Riyadh
18:30	Arthur 9'; Bahebri (yellow card) 36'; Al-Qumayzi (yellow card) 78'; Al-Sulaiheem (yellow card) 82'	Report	Aguirregaray 25', (yellow card) 90+1'	Stadium: Prince Faisal bin Fahd Stadium; Attendance: 2,552; Referee: Paweł Raczkowski (Poland)

24 September 2018 4	Al-Fateh	2–3	Al-Hilal	Al-Hasa
18:10	Oueslati 44' (pen.), 68' (pen.), (yellow card) 45+1'; Aguirregaray (yellow card) 52'; Bangoura (yellow card) 90+1'	Report	Kadesh (yellow card) 40'; Al-Habsi (yellow card) 42'; Gomis 59'; Carlos Eduardo 61'; Rivas 90+4'	Stadium: Prince Abdullah bin Jalawi Stadium; Attendance: 9,050; Referee: Paolo Valeri (Italy)

4 October 2018 5	Al-Fateh	2–0	Al-Ittihad	Al-Hasa
18:05	Naâmani (yellow card) 24'; Oueslati 26'; Al-Fuhaid (yellow card) 34'; Al-Majhad (yellow card) 89'; Al-Nadhri (yellow card) 90+1'; Al-Ammar (yellow card) 90+8'; Hamzi 90+9'	Report	Jurman (yellow card) 53'; Al-Sahafi (red card) 63'	Stadium: Prince Abdullah bin Jalawi Stadium; Attendance: 6,323; Referee: Simon Lee Evans (Wales)

19 October 2018 6	Al-Raed	0–3	Al-Fateh	Buraidah
18:15		Report	Al-Fuhaid 27'; Naâmani (yellow card) 35'; Lajami (yellow card) 61'; Koval (yellow card) 79'; Pedro 89', (yellow card) 89'; Al-Majhad 90+3'	Stadium: King Abdullah Sport City Stadium; Attendance: 2,443; Referee: Mark Clattenburg (England)

25 October 2018 7	Al-Ahli	5–1	Al-Fateh	Jeddah
18:30	Djaniny 17', 76'; Al Somah 42', 57'; Asiri 83'	Report	Toko 70'	Stadium: King Abdullah Sports City; Attendance: 7,602; Referee: Svein Oddvar Moen (Norway)

1 November 2018 8	Al-Fateh	1–2	Al-Fayha	Al-Hasa
17:35	Al-Juahaim (yellow card) 33'; Chenihi 75'	Report	Tziolis (yellow card) 16'; Asprilla 70'; Fernández 90+4'	Stadium: Prince Abdullah bin Jalawi Stadium; Attendance: 2,512; Referee: Jeroen Manschot (Netherlands)

8 November 2018 9	Al-Batin	2–2	Al-Fateh	Hafar al-Batin
17:45	Waqes (yellow card) 40'; Al-Johani 55'; Baraka (yellow card) 76'; Hamzah 82' (o.g.); Arango (yellow card) 89'	Report	Naâmani (yellow card) 36'; Bangoura (yellow card) 39', (goal) 45'; Hamzi 45+2'	Stadium: Al-Batin Club Stadium; Attendance: 2,933; Referee: Matthew Conger (New Zealand)

22 November 2018 10	Al-Fateh	4–0	Ohod	Al-Hasa
14:45	Oueslati 24'; Pedro 26'; Al-Yousef (yellow card) 38'; Bangoura 64'; Chenihi 79'; Hamzah (yellow card) 88'	Report		Stadium: Prince Abdullah bin Jalawi Stadium; Attendance: 1,651; Referee: Svein Oddvar Moen (Norway)

1 December 2018 11	Al-Fateh	0–2	Al-Taawoun	Al-Hasa
17:25	Bangoura (yellow card) 75'; Al-Fuhaid (yellow card) 88'	Report	Amissi 22'; Tawamba 68'; Machado (yellow card) 78'	Stadium: Prince Abdullah bin Jalawi Stadium; Attendance: 3,491; Referee: Svein Oddvar Moen (Norway)

8 December 2018 12	Al-Fateh	3–2	Al-Hazem	Al-Hasa
17:30	Lajami 9'; Al-Qeshtah 55' (o.g.); Al-Juahaim 90+4'; Al-Majhad (yellow card) 90+8'	Report	Al-Saiari 40'; Al-Qeshtah (yellow card) 86'; Bakheet 90'	Stadium: Prince Abdullah bin Jalawi Stadium; Attendance: 1,779; Referee: Svein Oddvar Moen (Norway)

13 December 2018 13	Al-Fateh	1–1	Al-Faisaly	Al-Hasa
17:30	Oueslati 40' (pen.); Toko (yellow card) 85'	Report	Igor Rossi 61'; Balghaith (yellow card) 81'; Al-Bakr (yellow card) 90+3'	Stadium: Prince Abdullah bin Jalawi Stadium; Attendance: 2,902; Referee: Szymon Marciniak (Poland)

21 December 2018 14	Al-Fateh	0–0	Al-Ettifaq	Al-Hasa
17:30	Oueslati (yellow card) 66'	Report	Al-Hazaa (yellow card) 87'; Al-Habib (red card) 90+2'; Arias (yellow card) 90+3'	Stadium: Prince Abdullah bin Jalawi Stadium; Attendance: 3,146; Referee: Hugo Miguel (Portugal)

28 December 2018 15	Al-Fateh	0–0	Al-Nassr	Al-Hasa
15:00	Al-Majhad (yellow card) 67'; Aguirregaray (yellow card) 85'	Report	Ramos (yellow card) 14' (yellow-red card) 54'	Stadium: Prince Abdullah bin Jalawi Stadium; Attendance: 8,381; Referee: Alberto Undiano Mallenco (Spain)

10 January 2019 16	Al-Wehda	1–0	Al-Fateh	Mecca
18:35	Al-Malki (yellow card) 38'; Amr (yellow card) 77'; Marcos Guilherme 90+2'	Report	Al-Hassan (yellow card) 33'; Al-Fuhaid (red card) 71'	Stadium: King Abdul Aziz Stadium; Attendance: 846; Referee: Viktor Kassai (Hungary)

27 January 2019 17	Al-Fateh	2–0	Al-Qadsiah	Al-Hasa
15:20	Pedro 19' (pen.), (yellow card) 89'; Al-Khabrani 90+3' (o.g.)	Report	Al-Zain (red card) 43'; Al-Khabrani (yellow card) 66'	Stadium: Prince Abdullah bin Jalawi Stadium; Attendance: 929; Referee: Mohammed Al-Hoaish

4 February 2019 18	Al-Hilal	4–1	Al-Fateh	Riyadh
18:20	Al Bulaihi (yellow card) 11'; Gomis 16' (pen.), 37', (yellow card) 69'; Carlos Eduardo 32'; Al-Abed 62', (yellow card) 66'	Report	Oueslati 11' (pen.); Pedro (yellow card) 15'; Aguirregaray (yellow card) 36'; Hamzi (yellow card) 39'	Stadium: King Saud University Stadium; Attendance: 22,486; Referee: Paweł Raczkowski (Poland)

9 February 2019 19	Al-Fateh	1–0	Al-Shabab	Al-Hasa
18:10	Korzun (yellow card) 50'; Hamzi (yellow card) 65'; Hamzah (yellow card) 76'; Chenihi 88'	Report	Muath (yellow card) 35' (yellow-red card) 56'	Stadium: Prince Abdullah bin Jalawi Stadium; Attendance: 2,849; Referee: Martin van den Kerkhof (Netherlands)

14 February 2019 20	Al-Fayha	1–2	Al-Fateh	Al Majma'ah
15:45	Al-Qahtani 38'; Al-Muziel (yellow card) 58'	Report	Korzun (yellow card) 52'; Jovanović (yellow card) 63'; Chenihi 69'; Al-Yousef (yellow card) 74'; Al-Hassan 79'	Stadium: King Salman Sport City Stadium; Attendance: 1,107; Referee: Turki Al-Khudhayr

20 February 2019 21	Al-Fateh	2–1	Al-Ahli	Al-Hasa
18:20	Al-Majhad 7', 90'; Al-Fuhaid (yellow card) 75'; Aguirregaray (yellow card) 87'	Report	Assiri (yellow card) 34', (goal) 73'; Baeza (yellow card) 55'; Abdulghani (yellow card) 90+5'	Stadium: Prince Abdullah bin Jalawi Stadium; Attendance: 4,807; Referee: Matthew Conger (New Zealand)

28 February 2019 22	Ohod	0–0	Al-Fateh	Medina
19:05	Haj Mohamad (yellow card) 58'; Medjani (yellow card) 78'; Ashoor (yellow card) 83'; O. Mohammed (yellow card) 84'	Report	Al-Dossari (yellow card) 22' (yellow-red card) 72'; Al-Fuhaid (yellow card) 69'; Korzun (yellow card) 69'	Stadium: Prince Mohammed bin Abdul Aziz Stadium; Attendance: 2,021; Referee: Ovidiu Hațegan (Romania)

9 March 2019 23	Al-Fateh	0–2	Al-Batin	Al-Hasa
15:40	Koval (yellow card) 30'; Oueslati (yellow card) 38'; Al-Fuhaid (yellow card) 43'	Report	Jhonnattann 19', 36'; Ounalli (yellow card) 45+2'; Kanabah (yellow card) 82'	Stadium: Prince Abdullah bin Jalawi Stadium; Attendance: 1,904; Referee: Pol van Boekel (Netherlands)

14 March 2019 24	Al-Taawoun	1–1	Al-Fateh	Buraidah
20:15	Amissi (yellow card) 36'; Tawamba 46', (yellow card) 73'; Adam (yellow card) 73'	Report	Al-Hassan (yellow card) 27'; Pedro 31'; Al-Dossari (yellow card) 52'; Naâmani (yellow card) 57'	Stadium: King Abdullah Sport City Stadium; Attendance: 2,465; Referee: Ravshan Irmatov (Uzbekistan)

28 March 2019 25	Al-Hazem	1–0	Al-Fateh	Ar Rass
16:00	Igboananike 47'; Al-Rio (yellow card) 83'; Al-Dossari (yellow card) 87'	Report	Al-Fuhaid (yellow card) 36'; Al-Najar (yellow card) 90'	Stadium: Al-Hazem Club Stadium; Attendance: 1,053; Referee: João Capela (Portugal)

5 April 2019 26	Al-Faisaly	1–1	Al-Fateh	Al Majma'ah
18:55	Luisinho 42'	Report	Al-Zaqaan 38'; Korzun (yellow card) 55'; Al-Juhaim (yellow card) 59'; Al-Fuhaid (yellow card) 68'	Stadium: King Salman Sport City Stadium; Attendance: 536; Referee: Matthew Conger (New Zealand)

11 April 2019 27	Al-Ettifaq	0–0	Al-Fateh	Dammam
18:40	Al-Aboud (yellow card) 46'; Al-Robeai (yellow card) 71'	Report	Naâmani (yellow card) 43'; Al-Zaqaan (yellow card) 81'	Stadium: Prince Mohamed bin Fahd Stadium; Attendance: 1,900; Referee: Serdar Gözübüyük (Netherlands)

18 April 2019 28	Al-Nassr	5–0	Al-Fateh	Riyadh
20:45	Hamdallah 27', 55'; Musa 38', 78'; Petros (yellow card) 39'; Giuliano 45+4'; Al-Jebreen (yellow card) 90'	Report	Aguirregaray (yellow card) 30'; Pedro (yellow card) 73', (goal) 89'	Stadium: Prince Faisal bin Fahd Stadium; Attendance: 5,793; Referee: Viktor Kassai (Hungary)

11 May 2019 29	Al-Ittihad	6–2	Al-Fateh	Jeddah
22:30	Prijović 16', 66', 70'; Villanueva 18', 44'; Romarinho 22'	Report	Korzun (yellow card) 5'; Jovanović 8', 63'	Stadium: King Abdullah Sports City; Attendance: 40,047; Referee: Anastasios Sidiropoulos (Greece)

16 May 2019 30	Al-Fateh	0–4	Al-Raed	Al-Hasa
22:30	Al-Juhaim (yellow card) 45'	Report	Kanu 6'; Al-Sulaitin 51'; Al-Shehri 54', 65', (yellow card) 73'; Hamoudan (yellow card) 83'	Stadium: Prince Abdullah bin Jalawi Stadium; Attendance: 250; Referee: Pavel Královec (Czech Republic)

=== King Cup ===
All times are local, AST (UTC+3).

2 January 2019 Round of 64	Al-Arabi	1–2	Al-Fateh	Buraidah
15:25	Al-Howail 52'	Report	Al-Juhaim 20'; Bangoura 44'	Stadium: King Abdullah Sport City Stadium; Referee: Faisal Al-Blwi

17 January 2019 Round of 32	Al-Qaisumah	3–0	Al-Fateh	Hafar al-Batin
15:25	Salami 22'; Chibane 30'; Al-Sahali 45+2'; Khemir (yellow card) 82'; Al-Mutairi (yellow card) 86'	Report	Al-Majhad (yellow card) 90+1'	Stadium: Al-Batin Club Stadium; Referee: Mohammed Al-Harbi

== Statistics ==
=== Squad statistics ===
Last updated on 16 May 2019.

No.	Pos	Nat	Player	Total		Pro League		King Cup	
No.	Pos	Nat	Player	Apps	Goals	Apps	Goals	Apps	Goals
Goalkeepers
12	GK	(Saudi Arabia)	Ali Al-Mazidi	2	0	1	0	1	0
34	GK	(Saudi Arabia)	Habib Al-Wotayan	0	0	0	0	0	0
35	GK	(Ukraine)	Maksym Koval	30	0	29	0	1	0
Defenders
3	DF	(Saudi Arabia)	Jamaan Al-Dossari	6	0	6	0	0	0
4	DF	(Algeria)	Mohamed Naâmani	17	0	15+2	0	0	0
5	DF	(Saudi Arabia)	Amjad Al-Meihan	0	0	0	0	0	0
17	DF	(Uruguay)	Matías Aguirregaray	26	1	25	1	1	0
19	DF	(Saudi Arabia)	Nawaf Boushal	0	0	0	0	0	0
23	DF	(Saudi Arabia)	Abdullah Al-Yousef	13	0	12	0	1	0
33	DF	(Saudi Arabia)	Yassin Hamzah	20	0	18+1	0	1	0
78	DF	(Saudi Arabia)	Ali Lajami	16	1	15	1	1	0
Midfielders
7	MF	(Saudi Arabia)	Ahmed Al-Nadhri	18	0	2+15	0	0+1	0
8	MF	(Belarus)	Nikita Korzun	11	0	11	0	0	0
10	MF	(Tunisia)	Abdelkader Oueslati	23	6	21+1	6	1	0
14	MF	(Saudi Arabia)	Mohammed Al-Fuhaid	29	1	27+1	1	1	0
15	MF	(Saudi Arabia)	Mansor Hamzi	29	2	20+7	2	1+1	0
16	MF	(Saudi Arabia)	Munther Al-Nakhli	3	0	0+2	0	0+1	0
21	MF	(Saudi Arabia)	Ali Al-Hassan	18	1	7+9	1	2	0
24	MF	(Algeria)	Ibrahim Chenihi	32	4	29+1	4	1+1	0
26	MF	(Saudi Arabia)	Ali Al-Zaqaan	11	1	5+5	1	1	0
29	MF	(Saudi Arabia)	Mohammed Al-Majhad	29	4	21+6	4	2	0
38	MF	(Saudi Arabia)	Ammar Al-Najjar	2	0	1+1	0	0	0
49	MF	(Saudi Arabia)	Salem Al-Najrani	0	0	0	0	0	0
77	MF	(Saudi Arabia)	Ibrahim Al-Telhi	7	0	0+7	0	0	0
Forwards
9	FW	(Saudi Arabia)	Hamad Al-Juhaim	22	2	9+11	1	1+1	1
11	FW	(Serbia)	Saša Jovanović	12	2	10+2	2	0	0
90	FW	(Brazil)	João Pedro	19	4	13+6	4	0	0
Players sent out on loan this season
18	MF	(Saudi Arabia)	Mohammed Al-Saeed	5	0	0+3	0	2	0
Player who made an appearance this season but have left the club
13	DF	(Saudi Arabia)	Abdullah Al-Ammar	9	0	9	0	0	0
28	MF	(Democratic Republic of the Congo)	Nzuzi Toko	12	1	10+1	1	1	0
37	MF	(Saudi Arabia)	Abdulaziz Al-Sharid	5	0	3+1	0	1	0
66	DF	(Saudi Arabia)	Sultan Al-Deayea	3	0	0+2	0	1	0
88	DF	(Saudi Arabia)	Majed Hazzazi	3	0	3	0	0	0
99	MF	(Guinea)	Alkhaly Bangoura	15	3	8+5	2	1+1	1

=== Goalscorers ===
Rank	No.	Pos	Nat	Name	Pro League	King Cup	Total
1	10	MF	(Tunisia)	Abdelkader Oueslati	6	0	6
2	24	MF	(Algeria)	Ibrahim Chenihi	4	0	4
2	29	MF	(Saudi Arabia)	Mohammed Al-Majhad	4	0	4
2	90	FW	(Brazil)	João Pedro	4	0	4
5	99	MF	(Guinea)	Alkhaly Bangoura	2	1	3
6	9	FW	(Saudi Arabia)	Hamad Al-Juhaim	1	1	2
6	11	FW	(Saudi Arabia)	Saša Jovanović	2	0	2
6	15	MF	(Saudi Arabia)	Mansor Hamzi	2	0	2
8	14	MF	(Saudi Arabia)	Mohammed Al-Fuhaid	1	0	1
8	17	DF	(Uruguay)	Matías Aguirregaray	1	0	1
8	21	MF	(Saudi Arabia)	Ali Al-Hassan	1	0	1
8	26	MF	(Saudi Arabia)	Ali Al-Zaqaan	1	0	1
8	28	MF	(Democratic Republic of the Congo)	Nzuzi Toko	1	0	1
8	78	DF	(Saudi Arabia)	Ali Lajami	1	0	1
Own goal					1	0	1
Total					32	2	34

Last Updated: 11 May 2019

=== Assists ===
Rank	No.	Pos	Nat	Name	Pro League	King Cup	Total
1	17	DF	(Uruguay)	Matías Aguirregaray	4	0	4
2	24	MF	(Algeria)	Ibrahim Chenihi	3	0	3
3	8	MF	(Belarus)	Nikita Korzun	1	0	1
3	9	FW	(Saudi Arabia)	Hamad Al-Juhaim	1	0	1
3	10	MF	(Tunisia)	Abdelkader Oueslati	1	0	1
3	15	MF	(Saudi Arabia)	Mansor Hamzi	1	0	1
3	18	MF	(Saudi Arabia)	Mohammed Al-Saeed	1	0	1
3	29	MF	(Saudi Arabia)	Mohammed Al-Majhad	1	0	1
3	33	DF	(Saudi Arabia)	Yassin Hamzah	1	0	1
Total					14	0	14

Last Updated: 11 May 2019

=== Clean sheets ===
Rank	No.	Pos	Nat	Name	Pro League	King Cup	Total
1	35	GK	(Ukraine)	Maksym Koval	11	0	11
Total					11	0	11

Last Updated: 11 April 2019
