= 2019–20 Al Hilal SFC season =

Al-Hilal
2019–20 season
- President: Fahad bin Nafil Al-Otaibi
- Manager: Răzvan Lucescu
- Stadium: King Saud University Stadium
- Pro League: 1st
- King Cup: Winners
- 2019 ACL: Winners
- 2020 ACL: Withdrew
- FIFA Club World Cup: Fourth place
- Top goalscorer: League: Bafétimbi Gomis (27); All: Bafétimbi Gomis (40)
- Highest home attendance: 22,916 vs Al-Ittihad (17 September 2019)
- Lowest home attendance: 7,604 vs Arar (3 November 2019)
- Average home league attendance: 18,823
| Home colours | Away colours |

The 2019–20 season was Al-Hilal's 44th consecutive season in the top flight of Saudi football and 62nd year in existence as a football club. The club participated in the Pro League, the King Cup and both the 2019 and the 2020 editions of the AFC Champions League. Al-Hilal also competed in the FIFA Club World Cup following their triumph in the 2019 AFC Champions League final. The season covers the period from 1 July 2019 to 29 November 2020. In this season, Al Hilal became the first Asian club to complete a continental treble since Tokyo Verdy in 1987.

== Players ==
=== Squad information ===
As of 31 January 2020

Note: Flags indicate national team as defined under FIFA eligibility rules; some limited exceptions apply. Players may hold more than one non-FIFA nationality.

| No. | Pos. | Nation | Player |
|---|---|---|---|
| 1 | GK | KSA | Abdullah Al-Mayouf |
| 2 | DF | KSA | Mohammed Al-Breik |
| 3 | MF | BRA | Carlos Eduardo |
| 5 | DF | KSA | Ali Al Bulaihi |
| 6 | MF | COL | Gustavo Cuéllar |
| 7 | MF | KSA | Salman Al-Faraj (Captain) |
| 8 | MF | KSA | Abdullah Otayf |
| 9 | FW | ITA | Sebastian Giovinco |
| 10 | MF | KSA | Mohammad Al-Shalhoub |
| 11 | FW | KSA | Saleh Al-Shehri (on loan from Al-Raed) |
| 12 | DF | KSA | Yasser Al-Shahrani |
| 16 | MF | KSA | Nasser Al-Dawsari |
| 17 | DF | KSA | Abdullah Al-Hafith |
| 18 | FW | FRA | Bafétimbi Gomis |
| 19 | MF | PER | André Carrillo |
| 20 | DF | KOR | Jang Hyun-soo |

| No. | Pos. | Nation | Player |
|---|---|---|---|
| 21 | GK | KSA | Yazan Jari |
| 22 | DF | KSA | Amiri Kurdi |
| 23 | DF | KSA | Madallah Al-Olayan |
| 24 | MF | KSA | Nawaf Al Abed |
| 27 | MF | KSA | Hattan Bahebri |
| 28 | MF | KSA | Mohamed Kanno |
| 29 | MF | KSA | Salem Al-Dawsari |
| 30 | GK | KSA | Mohammed Al-Waked |
| 34 | DF | KSA | Waleed Al-Ahmed |
| 35 | MF | KSA | Mansor Al Beshe |
| 40 | GK | KSA | Nawaf Al-Ghamdi |
| 55 | MF | KSA | Hamad Al-Abdan |
| 57 | GK | KSA | Mohammed Al-Shammari |
| 70 | DF | KSA | Mohammed Jahfali |
| 77 | FW | Ba'athist Syria | Omar Kharbin |

=== Out on loan ===
Note: Flags indicate national team as defined under FIFA eligibility rules; some limited exceptions apply. Players may hold more than one non-FIFA nationality.

| No. | Pos. | Nation | Player |
|---|---|---|---|
| 15 | MF | KSA | Ahmed Ashraf (at Al-Faisaly until 30 June 2020) |
| 32 | DF | KSA | Mohammed Al-Dossari (at Al-Raed until 30 June 2020) |
| 36 | DF | KSA | Muteb Al-Mufarrij (at Al-Shabab until 30 June 2020) |

| No. | Pos. | Nation | Player |
|---|---|---|---|
| 38 | FW | KSA | Khaled Al Gubaie (at Al-Shoulla until 30 June 2020) |
| 41 | MF | KSA | Thaar Al-Otaibi (at Al-Taawoun until 30 June 2020) |
| 45 | DF | AUS | Miloš Degenek (at Red Star Belgrade until 30 June 2020) |

== Transfers and loans ==
=== Transfers in ===
| Entry date | Position | No. | Player | From club | Fee | Ref. |
|---|---|---|---|---|---|---|
| 13 July 2019 | DF | 20 | (South Korea) Jang Hyun-soo | (Japan) Tokyo | $2,800,000 | |
| 13 July 2019 | MF | 19 | (Peru) André Carrillo | (Portugal) Benfica | $10,000,000 | |
| 20 August 2019 | DF | 22 | (Saudi Arabia) Amiri Kurdi | (Greece) Panionios | Undisclosed | |
| 30 August 2019 | MF | 6 | (Colombia) Gustavo Cuéllar | (Brazil) Flamengo | $8,250,000 | |
| 21 January 2020 | DF | 23 | (Saudi Arabia) Madallah Al-Olayan | (Saudi Arabia) Al-Taawoun | Free | |

=== Loans in ===
| Start date | End date | Position | No. | Player | To club | Fee | Ref. |
|---|---|---|---|---|---|---|---|
| 20 August 2019 | End of season | FW | 11 | (Saudi Arabia) Saleh Al-Shehri | (Saudi Arabia) Al-Raed | $535,000 | |

=== Transfers out ===
| Exit date | Position | No. | Player | To club | Fee | Ref. |
|---|---|---|---|---|---|---|
| 13 June 2019 | MF | 28 | (Saudi Arabia) Mohanad Fallatah | (Saudi Arabia) Al-Fayha | Free | |
| 18 June 2019 | MF | 15 | (Saudi Arabia) Majed Al-Najrani | (Saudi Arabia) Al-Ettifaq | Free | |
| 24 June 2019 | MF | – | (Argentina) Ezequiel Cerutti | (Argentina) San Lorenzo | Free | |
| 2 July 2019 | GK | 23 | (Saudi Arabia) Marwan Al-Haidari | (Saudi Arabia) Al-Shabab | Free | |
| 5 July 2019 | MF | 6 | (Saudi Arabia) Abdulmalek Al-Khaibri | (Saudi Arabia) Al-Shabab | Free | |
| 8 July 2019 | DF | 33 | (Saudi Arabia) Ahmed Sharahili | (Saudi Arabia) Al-Shabab | Free | |
| 12 July 2019 | DF | – | (Saudi Arabia) Omar Al-Owdah | (Saudi Arabia) Al-Raed | Free | |
| 16 July 2019 | MF | 27 | (Morocco) Achraf Bencharki | (Egypt) Zamalek | Undisclosed | |
| 19 July 2019 | FW | 31 | (Saudi Arabia) Abdulrahman Al-Yami | (Saudi Arabia) Al-Hazem | Undisclosed | |
| 20 July 2019 | GK | 26 | (Oman) Ali Al-Habsi | (England) West Bromwich Albion | Released | |
| 23 July 2019 | DF | – | (Saudi Arabia) Naif Kariri | (Saudi Arabia) Ohod | Free | |
| 24 July 2019 | DF | – | (Saudi Arabia) Anas Zabani | (Saudi Arabia) Al-Qadsiah | Free | |
| 25 July 2019 | FW | 15 | (Saudi Arabia) Mojahed Al-Munee | (Saudi Arabia) Al-Tai | Free | |
| 17 August 2019 | MF | 59 | (Saudi Arabia) Fahad Al-Rashidi | (Saudi Arabia) Al-Taawoun | Free | |
| 30 August 2019 | DF | 4 | (Spain) Alberto Botía | (Saudi Arabia) Al-Wehda | Free | |
| 30 August 2019 | FW | 25 | (Spain) Jonathan Soriano | | Released | |
| 21 January 2020 | DF | 13 | (Saudi Arabia) Hassan Kadesh | (Saudi Arabia) Al-Taawoun | Free | |

=== Loans out ===
| Start date | End date | Position | No. | Player | To club | Fee | Ref. |
|---|---|---|---|---|---|---|---|
| 23 July 2019 | End of season | DF | 45 | (Australia) Miloš Degenek | (Serbia) Red Star Belgrade | Undisclosed | |
| 21 August 2019 | End of season | DF | 32 | (Saudi Arabia) Mohammed Al-Dossari | (Saudi Arabia) Al-Raed | None | |
| 23 August 2019 | End of season | MF | 15 | (Saudi Arabia) Ahmed Ashraf | (Saudi Arabia) Al-Faisaly | $215,000 | |
| 30 August 2019 | 31 January 2020 | FW | 38 | (Saudi Arabia) Khaled Al Gubaie | (Saudi Arabia) Al-Adalah | None | |
| 31 August 2019 | End of season | DF | 36 | (Saudi Arabia) Muteb Al-Mufarrij | (Saudi Arabia) Al-Shabab | None | |
| 28 January 2020 | End of season | MF | 41 | (Saudi Arabia) Thaar Al-Otaibi | (Saudi Arabia) Al-Taawoun | None | |
| 31 January 2020 | End of season | FW | 38 | (Saudi Arabia) Khaled Al Gubaie | (Saudi Arabia) Al-Shoulla | None | |

== Pre-season ==
| 9 July 2019 Friendly | Al-Hilal (Saudi Arabia) | 10–0 | (Austria) SV Spittal | Lienz, Austria |
| 18:30 CEST | Gomis 10', 23', 38'; Al-Fiqi 29'; Bahebri 34'; Giovinco 44'; Al-Shalhoub 81'; Al Gubaie 86'; Carlos Eduardo 87', 90' | Report | | Stadium: Dolomiten Stadium |

| 13 July 2019 Friendly | Al-Hilal (Saudi Arabia) | 11–0 | (Austria) Rapid Lienz | Lienz, Austria |
| 18:00 CEST | Soriano 7'; Al-Fiqi 15', 30', 34'; Botía 21'; Carlos Eduardo 54', 55', 59'; Al Gubaie 60'; Bahebri 71', 84' | Report | | Stadium: Dolomiten Stadium |

| 17 July 2019 Friendly | Al-Hilal (Saudi Arabia) | 2–1 | (Hungary) Budafoki MTE | Lienz, Austria |
| 18:00 CEST | Gomis 23'; Al-Hafith 88' | Report | 51' | Stadium: Dolomiten Stadium |

| 21 July 2019 Friendly | Al-Hilal (Saudi Arabia) | 2–0 | (Slovenia) Ilirija | Lienz, Austria |
| 12:00 CEST | Jahfali 43'; Giovinco 81' | Report | | Stadium: Dolomiten Stadium |

| 21 July 2019 Friendly | Al-Hilal (Saudi Arabia) | 10–0 | (Slovenia) Bled | Seeboden, Austria |
| 19:00 CEST | Soriano; Kharbin; Al-Shalhoub; Al-Otaibi (o.g.) | Report | | Stadium: Sportarena Seeboden |

| 24 July 2019 Friendly | Al-Hilal (Saudi Arabia) | 7–1 | (Slovenia) Brinje Grosuplje | Lienz, Austria |
| 13:00 CEST | Soriano; Al-Shalhoub; Al-Dawsari; Kharbin; Bahebri; Al-Fiqi | | | Stadium: Dolomiten Stadium |

| 24 July 2019 Friendly | Al-Hilal (Saudi Arabia) | 3–2 | (Italy) Udinese | Villach, Austria |
| 18:00 CEST | Al-Dawsari 19', 44'; Gomis 69' | | Becão 29'; Ter Avest 57' | Stadium: Stadion Villach-Lind |

== Competitions ==
=== Overall ===
| Competition | Started round | Final position / round | First match | Last match |
|---|---|---|---|---|
| Pro League | Matchday 1 | Winners | 23 August 2019 | 9 September 2020 |
| King Cup | Round of 64 | Winners | 3 November 2019 | 29 November 2020 |
| 2019 Champions League | Group stage | Winners | 5 March 2019 | 24 November 2019 |
| 2020 Champions League | Group stage | Group stage (withdrew) | 10 February 2020 | 23 September 2020 |
| FIFA Club World Cup | Second round | Fourth place | 14 December 2019 | 21 December 2019 |

Source: Competitions

=== Overview ===
| Competition | Record | | | | | | | |
| Competition | G | W | D | L | GF | GA | GD | Win % |
|---|---|---|---|---|---|---|---|---|
| Pro League | 30 | 22 | 6 | 2 | 74 | 26 | +48 | 73.33 |
| King Cup | 6 | 5 | 1 | 0 | 16 | 7 | +9 | 83.33 |
| 2019 Champions League | 8 | 5 | 1 | 2 | 16 | 9 | +7 | 62.50 |
| 2020 Champions League | 5 | 3 | 2 | 0 | 6 | 2 | +4 | 60.00 |
| FIFA Club World Cup | 3 | 1 | 1 | 1 | 4 | 5 | −1 | 33.33 |
| Total | 52 | 36 | 11 | 5 | 116 | 49 | +67 | 69.23 |

Source: Competitions

=== Pro League ===
==== League table ====
| Pos | Team | Pld | W | D | L | GF | GA | GD | Pts | Qualification or relegation |
|---|---|---|---|---|---|---|---|---|---|---|
| 1 | Al-Hilal (C) | 30 | 22 | 6 | 2 | 74 | 26 | +48 | 72 | Qualification for AFC Champions League group stage |
| 2 | Al-Nassr | 30 | 19 | 7 | 4 | 60 | 26 | +34 | 64 | Qualification for AFC Champions League group stage |
| 3 | Al-Ahli | 30 | 15 | 5 | 10 | 49 | 36 | +13 | 50 | Qualification for AFC Champions League group stage |
| 4 | Al-Wehda | 30 | 16 | 1 | 13 | 45 | 40 | +5 | 49 | Qualification for AFC Champions League play-off round |
| 5 | Al-Faisaly | 30 | 14 | 6 | 10 | 41 | 36 | +5 | 48 | |

Updated to match(es) played on 9 September 2020. Source: spl.com
Rules for classification: 1) Points; 2) Head-to-head points; 3) Head-to-head goal difference; 4) Total goal difference; 5) Total goals scored; 6) Fair-play points (Note: Head-to-head record is used only after all the matches between the teams in question have been played).
(C) Champions

==== Results summary ====
| Overall | | | | | | | | Home | | | | | | Away | | | | | |
| Pld | W | D | L | GF | GA | GD | Pts | W | D | L | GF | GA | GD | W | D | L | GF | GA | GD |
|---|---|---|---|---|---|---|---|---|---|---|---|---|---|---|---|---|---|---|---|
| 30 | 22 | 6 | 2 | 74 | 26 | +48 | 72 | 13 | 1 | 1 | 39 | 12 | +27 | 9 | 5 | 1 | 35 | 14 | +21 |

Last updated: 9 September 2020.

==== Results by round ====
| Round | 1 | 2 | 3 | 4 | 5 | 6 | 7 | 8 | 9 | 10 | 11 | 12 | 13 | 14 | 15 | 16 | 17 | 18 | 19 | 20 | 21 | 22 | 23 | 24 | 25 | 26 | 27 | 28 | 29 | 30 |
|---|---|---|---|---|---|---|---|---|---|---|---|---|---|---|---|---|---|---|---|---|---|---|---|---|---|---|---|---|---|---|
| Ground | H | A | H | A | H | A | H | H | A | H | H | A | A | H | A | A | H | A | H | A | H | A | A | H | A | A | H | H | A | H |
| Result | W | W | D | W | W | W | W | L | D | W | W | D | D | W | D | W | W | W | W | W | W | D | W | W | W | L | W | W | W | W |
| Position | 1 | 1 | 1 | 1 | 1 | 1 | 1 | 1 | 1 | 1 | 2 | 2 | 7 | 1 | 2 | 1 | 1 | 1 | 1 | 1 | 1 | 1 | 1 | 1 | 1 | 1 | 1 | 1 | 1 | 1 |

Updated to match(es) played on 4 September 2020. Source:
A = Away; H = Home; W = Win; D = Draw; L = Loss

==== Matches ====
All times are local, AST (UTC+3).

Win Draw Loss Postponed

| 23 August 2019 1 | Al-Hilal | 4–2 | Abha | Riyadh |
| 19:00 | Gomis 39', 44'; Giovinco 63'; Hyun-soo (yellow card) 79'; Kharbin 85' | Report | Andriatsima 20'; Bguir 81' (pen.); Al-Habib (yellow card) 87' | Stadium: King Saud University Stadium; Attendance: 18,022; Referee: Dennis Higler (Netherlands) |

| 31 August 2019 2 | Al-Raed | 0–5 | Al-Hilal | Buraidah |
| 19:05 | Fouzair (yellow card) 20'; Al-Farhan (yellow card) 37' | Report | Kharbin 6', 80'; Al-Faraj (yellow card) 32', (goal) 44'; Gomis 59'; Carlos Eduardo 67' | Stadium: King Abdullah Sport City Stadium; Attendance: 11,601; Referee: Damir Skomina (Slovenia) |

| 14 September 2019 3 | Al-Hilal | 1–1 | Al-Fayha | Riyadh |
| 18:40 | Al-Abed 50'; Cuéllar (yellow card) 74'; Carrillo (yellow card) 87' | Report | Al-Qahtani (yellow card) 18'; Al-Muziel (yellow card) 89'; Assis (yellow card) 90+2'; Arsénio 90+4', (yellow card) 90+5' | Stadium: King Saud University Stadium; Attendance: 15,561; Referee: Krzysztof Jakubik (Poland) |

| 21 September 2019 4 | Al-Ittihad | 1–3 | Al-Hilal | Jeddah |
| 20:20 | Al-Malki (yellow card) 20' (yellow-red card) 82'; Romarinho 31'; Al-Sahafi (yellow card) 66'; Abdulhamid (yellow card) 73' | Report | Carlos Eduardo 15', 26'; Al-Shahrani (yellow card) 22'; Giovinco 89' | Stadium: King Abdullah Sports City; Attendance: 43,783; Referee: Cüneyt Çakır (Turkey) |

| 26 September 2019 5 | Al-Hilal | 2–1 | Al-Taawoun | Riyadh |
| 20:15 | Kharbin 9'; Al-Mousa 68' (o.g.) | Report | Amissi 4', (yellow card) 12'; Petrolina (yellow card) 56'; Al-Absi (yellow card) 72' | Stadium: King Saud University Stadium; Attendance: 17,989; Referee: Ovidiu Hațegan (Romania) |

| 5 October 2019 6 | Al-Ettifaq | 1–4 | Al-Hilal | Dammam |
| 18:00 | Yambéré (yellow card) 19'; Al-Amri 29', (yellow card) 59'; Haddadi (yellow card) 35'; Mahnashi (yellow card) 40'; Sliti (yellow card) 45+4' | Report | Carlos Eduardo 20' (pen.), 90+4'; Al-Shahrani (yellow card) 28'; Al-Faraj (yellow card) 44'; Cuéllar (yellow card) 45+1'; Al-Shehri 56'; Gomis 76' | Stadium: Prince Mohamed bin Fahd Stadium; Attendance: 13,558; Referee: Anastasios Sidiropoulos (Greece) |

| 18 October 2019 7 | Al-Hilal | 3–0 | Damac | Riyadh |
| 18:05 | Giovinco 22'; Gomis 55'; Carlos Eduardo 68'; Bahebri (yellow card) 81' | Report | Al-Dossari (yellow card) 50' (yellow-red card) 63'; Hadraf (yellow card) 81' | Stadium: King Saud University Stadium; Attendance: 19,889; Referee: Hugo Miguel (Portugal) |

| 27 October 2019 8 | Al-Hilal | 1–2 | Al-Nassr | Riyadh |
| 19:55 | Carlos Eduardo 32'; Al-Breik (yellow card) 47'; Cuéllar (yellow card) 71'; Al-Abed (yellow card) 90' | Report | Al-Khaibari (yellow card) 37'; Hamdallah 55', 73', (yellow card) 74'; Petros (yellow card) 71' | Stadium: King Saud University Stadium; Attendance: 21,792; Referee: Xavier Estrada Fernández (Spain) |

| 31 October 2019 9 | Al-Fateh | 3–3 | Al-Hilal | Al-Hasa |
| 19:50 | Saâdane 8' (pen.), (yellow card) 20' te Vrede 77', 88'; Aguirregaray (yellow card) 81'; Majrashi (yellow card) 90+1' | Report | Al-Shahrani (yellow card) 7'; Al-Shehri 22'; Carlos Eduardo 34'; Al-Faraj (yellow card) 84'; Gomis 90+5' | Stadium: Prince Abdullah bin Jalawi Stadium; Attendance: 13,806; Referee: Ivan Bebek (Croatia) |

| 26 December 2019 13 | Al-Hazem | 1–1 | Al-Hilal | Ar Rass |
| 19:50 | Hamzi 53'; Asselah (yellow card) 84' | Report | Giovinco 90+1' | Stadium: Al-Hazem Club Stadium; Attendance: 5,400; Referee: Shukri Al-Hanfoush |

| 30 December 2019 10 | Al-Hilal | 7–0 | Al-Adalah | Riyadh |
| 17:55 | Al-Abed 15'; Gomis 28', 40', 57'; Giovinco 34'; Al-Shehri 84'; Carrillo 90' | Report | Al-Burayh (yellow card) 39' | Stadium: King Saud University Stadium; Attendance: 15,631; Referee: Ivan Kružliak (Slovakia |

| 7 January 2020 11 | Al-Hilal | 3–1 | Al-Ahli | Riyadh |
| 20:00 | Al-Faraj (yellow card) 25'; Al-Dawsari 37'; Kanno (yellow card) 42'; Al-Breik (yellow card) 66'; Gomis 70'; Al-Bulaihi 90' | Report | Asiri (yellow card) 44'; Al Somah 45'; Belaïli (yellow card) 73'; Sarić (yellow card) 78' | Stadium: King Saud University Stadium; Attendance: 21,543; Referee: Szymon Marciniak (Poland) |

| 11 January 2020 14 | Al-Hilal | 3–1 | Al-Wehda | Riyadh |
| 20:05 | Gomis 31' (pen.), 77'; Al-Shehri 70', (yellow card) 81' | Report | Anselmo 9'; Goodwin (yellow card) 61'; Niakaté (yellow card) 76' | Stadium: King Saud University Stadium; Attendance: 20,192; Referee: Ovidiu Hațegan (Romania) |

| 20 January 2020 12 | Al-Faisaly | 2–2 | Al-Hilal | Al Majma'ah |
| 18:10 | Hyland 55', 90+2'; Silva (yellow card) 74'; Al-Ghamdi (yellow card) 86' | Report | Giovinco 47'; Kurdi (yellow card) 55'; Carlos Eduardo 88' (pen.) | Stadium: Al Majma'ah Sports City; Attendance: 4,710; Referee: Andris Treimanis (Latvia) |

| 25 January 2020 15 | Al-Shabab | 0–0 | Al-Hilal | Riyadh |
| 18:10 | N'Diaye (yellow card) 50'; Al-Shamekh (yellow card) 89'; Al-Ammar (yellow card) 90+5' | Report | Al-Bulaihi (yellow card) 9' (yellow-red card) 82'; Kurdi (yellow card) 39' | Stadium: Prince Faisal bin Fahd Stadium; Attendance: 12,531; Referee: Svein Oddvar Moen (Norway) |

| 31 January 2020 16 | Abha | 1–2 | Al-Hilal | Abha |
| 16:00 AST (UTC+3) | Aouadhi (yellow card) 41'; Andriatsima 88', (yellow card) 89'; Bguir (yellow card) 90+3' | Report | Carrillo 9'; Gomis 13'; Otayf (yellow card) 84' | Stadium: Prince Sultan bin Abdul Aziz Stadium; Attendance: 16,820; Referee: Igor Pajač (Croatia) |

| 5 February 2020 17 | Al-Hilal | 3–1 | Al-Raed | Riyadh |
| 20:20 | Carlos Eduardo 6'; Gomis 42' (pen.); Al-Mayouf 90+6' | Report | Al-Hussain (yellow card) 30'; Al-Farhan (yellow card) 41'; Fouzair 60' (pen.) | Stadium: King Saud University Stadium; Attendance: 16,566; Referee: Aleksei Kulbakov (Belarus) |

| 13 February 2020 18 | Al-Fayha | 0–1 | Al-Hilal | Al Majma'ah |
| 18:30 | Neto (yellow card) 52'; Al-Qahtani (yellow card) 90+4' | Report | Al-Olayan (yellow card) 55'; Carlos Eduardo (yellow card) 62'; Al-Breik 69' | Stadium: Al Majma'ah Sports City; Attendance: 5,488; Referee: Andreas Ekberg (Sweden) |

| 22 February 2020 19 | Al-Hilal | 1–0 | Al-Ittihad | Riyadh |
| 20:30 | Al-Dawsari (yellow card) 20'; Cuéllar (yellow card) 45'; Jahfali (yellow card) 50'; Al-Shahrani (yellow card) 73'; Carlos Eduardo 90+3' | Report | Al-Harbi (yellow card) 19'; Al-Sumairi (yellow card) 30'; Al-Malki (yellow card) 61'; Al-Shamrani (yellow card) 63' | Stadium: King Saud University Stadium; Attendance: 21,044; Referee: Szymon Marciniak (Poland) |

| 27 February 2020 20 | Al-Taawoun | 0–1 | Al-Hilal | Buraidah |
| 18:40 | Darwish (yellow card) 5'; Abousaban (yellow card) 37' | Report | Hyun-soo (yellow card) 10'; Al-Dawsari 16'; Jahfali (yellow card) 47'; Gomis (yellow card) 88'; Giovinco (yellow card) 90' | Stadium: King Abdullah Sport City Stadium; Attendance: 15,650; Referee: Slavko Vinčić (Slovenia) |

| 7 March 2020 21 | Al-Hilal | 1–0 | Al-Ettifaq | Riyadh |
| 20:40 | Carrillo 17'; Al-Faraj (yellow card) 90+2'; Al-Olayan (yellow card) 90+5' | Report | Mahnashi (yellow card) 74' | Stadium: King Saud University Stadium; Attendance: 0 (Note: Matches from 7 March and onwards were played behind closed doors due to concerns over the coronavirus outbreak.); Referee: Srđan Jovanović (Serbia) |

| 11 March 2020 22 | Damac | 1–1 | Al-Hilal | Abha |
| 16:10 | Zelaya 42'; Al-Jouei (yellow card) 88' | Report | Carrillo 39' | Stadium: Prince Sultan bin Abdul Aziz Stadium; Attendance: 0 Referee: Pavel Královec (Czech Republic) |

| 5 August 2020 23 | Al-Nassr | 1–4 | Al-Hilal | Riyadh |
| 21:00 | Hamdallah (yellow card) 41'; S. Al-Ghanam 45+1'; Al-Amri (yellow card) 87'; Ali (yellow card) 90+5' | Report | Al-Shahrani (yellow card) 9'; Giovinco 35'; Gomis 55' (pen.), 80'; Carlos Eduardo 60' | Stadium: King Fahd International Stadium; Attendance: 0 Referee: Benoît Bastien (France) |

| 10 August 2020 24 | Al-Hilal | 2–1 | Al-Fateh | Riyadh |
| 21:00 | Gomis 38' (pen.), 87' (pen.); Al-Shahrani (yellow card) 79'; Hyun-soo (yellow card) 81'; Al-Shehri (yellow card) 90+4' | Report | Al-Hassan (yellow card) 38'; Gomis 53' (o.g.); Lajami (yellow card) 69'; Al-Zaqaan (yellow card) 74'; Al-Dossari (yellow card) 89' | Stadium: King Saud University Stadium; Attendance: 0 Referee: Georgi Kabakov (Bulgaria) |

| 15 August 2020 25 | Al-Adalah | 0–4 | Al-Hilal | Al-Hasa |
| 18:55 | Al-Sultan (yellow card) 60'; Al-Radhi (red card) 90+1' | Report | Gomis 30', 75'; Giovinco (yellow card) 42'; Al-Dawsari (yellow card) 52', (goal) 79'; Kharbin 90+2' | Stadium: Prince Abdullah bin Jalawi Stadium; Attendance: 0 Referee: Mattias Gestranius (Finland) |

| 20 August 2020 26 | Al-Ahli | 2–1 | Al-Hilal | Jeddah |
| 20:55 | Al Somah 5'; Al-Asmari (yellow card) 45+1'; Sarić (yellow card) 57'; A. Asiri 74'; Al-Moasher (yellow card) 76'; Abo Shararah (yellow card) 90+5' | Report | Jahfali (yellow card) 7'; Al-Bulaihi 62'; Carrillo (yellow card) 72'; Cuéllar (yellow card) 90+1' | Stadium: King Abdullah Sports City; Attendance: 0 Referee: Andrés Cunha (Uruguay) |

| 25 August 2020 27 | Al-Hilal | 2–0 | Al-Faisaly | Riyadh |
| 19:00 | Carrillo (yellow card) 48'; Giovinco (yellow card) 67'; Al-Breik (yellow card) 69'; Gomis 82'; Kharbin 90+6' | Report | Silva (yellow card) 62' | Stadium: King Saud University Stadium; Attendance: 0 Referee: Néstor Pitana (Argentina) |

| 29 August 2020 28 | Al-Hilal | 4–1 | Al-Hazem | Riyadh |
| 20:40 | Al-Dawsari 8'; Gomis 40' (pen.), 53', 56' (pen.); Giovinco (yellow card) 45+3'; Al-Shahrani (yellow card) 59' | Report | Al-Yami 3'; Asselah (yellow card) 37' | Stadium: King Saud University Stadium; Attendance: 0 Referee: Andris Treimanis (Latvia) |

| 4 September 2020 29 | Al-Wehda | 1–3 | Al-Hilal | Mecca |
| 20:35 | Al-Sqoor (yellow card) 50'; Al-Qarni (yellow card) 55'; Bakshween (yellow card) 58'; Renato 79' | Report | Gomis 16'; Kanno 56'; Al-Faraj 85'; Cuéllar (yellow card) 90+6' | Stadium: King Abdul Aziz Stadium; Attendance: 0 Referee: Vítor Ferreira (Portugal) |

| 9 September 2020 30 | Al-Hilal | 2–1 | Al-Shabab | Riyadh |
| 20:35 | Gomis 20', 69'; Al-Breik (yellow card) 53' | Report | Guanca 46' | Stadium: King Saud University Stadium; Attendance: 0 Referee: Gediminas Mažeika (Lithuania) |

=== King Cup ===
All times are local, AST (UTC+3).

| 3 November 2019 Round of 64 | Al-Hilal | 4–1 | Arar | Riyadh |
| 19:45 | Hamani 43' (o.g.); Al-Shalhoub 57'; Carlos Eduardo 81'; Bahebri 90+1' | Report | Al-Khater (yellow card) 48'; F. Al-Enezi 90+3' | Stadium: King Saud University Stadium; Attendance: 7,604; Referee: Shukri Al-Hanfoush |

| 7 December 2019 Round of 32 | Al-Hilal | 4–2 | Al-Jabalain | Riyadh |
| 17:45 | Al-Shalhoub 25'; Kharbin 55'; Carrillo 86'; Eduardo 90' | Report | Carlão 28'; Zidan (yellow card) 79'; El Okbi 82' | Stadium: Prince Faisal bin Fahd Stadium; Referee: Mohammed Al-Hoaish |

| 3 January 2020 Round of 16 | Al-Faisaly | 2–2 (5–6 p) | Al-Hilal | Al Majma'ah |
| 19:50 | Bonevacia 29' (pen.); Qassem 73'; Hyland (yellow card) 89'; Rossi (yellow card) 90'; Malayekah (yellow card) 90+5'; Al-Dawsari (yellow card) 101' | Report | Al-Breik 19'; Jahfali (yellow card) 41'; Al-Shehri 63'; Kanno (yellow card) 70'; Gomis (yellow card) 114' | Stadium: Al Majma'ah Sports City; Referee: Ivan Bebek (Croatia) |
| | Penalties |
| | Hyland (penalty scored); Silva (penalty scored); William (penalty scored); Al-Dawsari (penalty scored); Rossi (penalty scored); Qassem (penalty missed) | | (penalty scored) Carrillo; (penalty scored) Al-Breik; (penalty scored) Al-Dawsari; (penalty scored) Gomis; (penalty scored) Al-Mayouf; (penalty scored) Al-Abed |

| 16 January 2020 Quarter-finals | Al-Hilal | 2–1 | Al-Ettifaq | Riyadh |
| 18:05 | Al-Shehri 4', 96'; Bahebri (yellow card) 55'; Giovinco (yellow card) 78' | Report | Al-Hazaa (yellow card) 45+2'; Mahnashi (yellow card) 64'; Al-Robeai (red card) 72'; Al-Amri (yellow card) 81'; Kiss 85' (pen.); Al-Kwikbi (yellow card) 115' | Stadium: King Saud University Stadium; Attendance: 18,731; Referee: Bobby Madden (Scotland) |

| 27 October 2020 Semi-finals | Al-Hilal | 2–0 | Abha | Riyadh |
| 17:55 | Al-Dawsari 28', (yellow card) 66'; Cuéllar (yellow card) 38'; Giovinco 45+1' | Report | | Stadium: King Saud University Stadium; Attendance: 0 Referee: Eber Aquino (Paraguay) |

| 29 November 2020 Final | Al-Hilal | 2–1 | Al-Nassr | Riyadh |
| 19:45 | Jang Hyun-soo 10'; Cuéllar (yellow card) 33'; Gomis 42' (pen.); Al-Wotayan (yellow card) 90+5' | Report | Al-Sulayhem (yellow card) 54'; Yahya 71', (yellow card) 83' | Stadium: King Saud University Stadium; Attendance: 0 Referee: Szymon Marciniak (Poland) |

=== 2019 AFC Champions League ===
==== Knockout phase ====
===== Round of 16 =====
| 6 August 2019 First leg | Al-Ahli (Saudi Arabia) | 2–4 | (Saudi Arabia) Al-Hilal | Jeddah, Saudi Arabia |
| 19:40 UTC+3 | Al-Khabrani (yellow card) 2'; Al Somah 6', (yellow card) 61'; Djaniny 39'; Aleksić (yellow card) 45+2'; Souza (yellow card) 90' | Live Report; Stats Report | Gomis 15', 48', 65'; Al-Bulaihi (yellow card) 34'; Al-Dawsari (yellow card) 36'; Al-Hafith 81'; Otayf (yellow card) 90' | Stadium: King Abdullah Sports City; Attendance: 48,094; Referee: Ahmed Al-Kaf (Oman) |

| 13 August 2019 Second leg | Al-Hilal (Saudi Arabia) | 0–1 (4–3 agg.) | (Saudi Arabia) Al-Ahli | Riyadh, Saudi Arabia |
| 20:30 UTC+3 | Al-Dawsari (yellow card) 89'; Bahebri (yellow card) 90'; Gomis (yellow card) 90+3' | Live Report; Stats Report | Al-Fatil (yellow card) 37'; Asiri 42'; Souza (yellow card) 55'; Al-Moasher (yellow card) 68'; Al-Owais (yellow card) 90+3' | Stadium: King Saud University Stadium; Attendance: 22,706; Referee: Ma Ning (China) |

===== Quarter-finals =====
| 27 August 2019 First leg | Al-Ittihad (Saudi Arabia) | 0–0 | (Saudi Arabia) Al-Hilal | Jeddah, Saudi Arabia |
| 20:45 UTC+3 | Abdulhamid (yellow card) 75' | Live Report; Stats Report | Kanno (yellow card) 45+1' | Stadium: King Abdullah Sports City; Attendance: 54,390; Referee: Chris Beath (Australia) |

| 17 September 2019 Second leg | Al-Hilal (Saudi Arabia) | 3–1 (3–1 agg.) | (Saudi Arabia) Al-Ittihad | Riyadh, Saudi Arabia |
| 20:00 UTC+3 | Al-Faraj (yellow card) 22'; Carrillo 44'; S. Al-Dawsari 48'; Giovinco 78' | Live Report; Stats Report | Al-Sahafi 10', (yellow card) 50'; Villanueva (yellow card) 54'; Vecchio (yellow card) 75' | Stadium: King Saud University Stadium; Attendance: 22,916; Referee: Ryuji Sato (Japan) |

===== Semi-finals =====
| 1 October 2019 First leg | Al-Sadd (Qatar) | 1–4 | (Saudi Arabia) Al-Hilal | Doha, Qatar |
| 18:30 UTC+3 | Gomis 14' (o.g.); Hassan (yellow card) 35' (yellow-red card) 35'; Khoukhi (yellow card) 36'; Bounedjah (yellow card) 45+2' | Live Report; Stats Report | Gomis 33', 60'; Al-Bulaihi 45'; Al-Shalhoub 67' | Stadium: Jassim bin Hamad Stadium; Attendance: 13,753; Referee: Ahmed Al-Kaf (Oman) |

| 22 October 2019 Second leg | Al-Hilal (Saudi Arabia) | 2–4 (6–5 agg.) | (Qatar) Al-Sadd | Riyadh, Saudi Arabia |
| 19:15 UTC+3 | S. Al-Dawsari 13'; Al-Breik (yellow card) 16'; Gomis 25'; Al-Shahrani (yellow card) 89' | Live Report; Stats Report | Afif 17' (pen.); Nam Tae-hee 19'; Al-Haydos 20'; Al-Hajri (yellow card) 44'; Khoukhi (yellow card) 58', (goal) 90+3'; Salman (yellow card) 68'; Assadalla (yellow card) 75' | Stadium: King Saud University Stadium; Attendance: 20,743; Referee: Muhammad Taqi (Singapore) |

===== Final =====
| 9 November 2019 First leg | Al-Hilal (Saudi Arabia) | 1–0 | (Japan) Urawa Red Diamonds | Riyadh, Saudi Arabia |
| 19:30 UTC+3 | Al-Bulaihi (yellow card) 38'; Carrillo 60' | Live Report; Stats Report | | Stadium: King Saud University Stadium; Attendance: 22,549; Referee: Ali Sabah (Iraq) |

| 24 November 2019 Second leg | Urawa Red Diamonds (Japan) | 0–2 (0–3 agg.) | (Saudi Arabia) Al-Hilal | Saitama, Japan |
| 19:00 UTC+9 | Sekine (yellow card) 43'; Aoki (yellow card) 53'; Iwanami (yellow card) 57'; Makino (yellow card) 76' | Live Report; Stats Report | Al-Dawsari 74'; Gomis 90+3' | Stadium: Saitama Stadium 2002; Attendance: 58,109; Referee: Valentin Kovalenko (Uzbekistan) |

=== 2020 AFC Champions League ===
==== Group stage ====
The group stage draw was made on 10 December 2019 in Kuala Lumpur. Al-Hilal were drawn with Shabab Al-Ahli Dubai, Pakhtakor, and Shahr Khodro.

| Pos | Team | Pld | W | D | L | GF | GA | GD | Pts | Qualification | PAK | SAH | SHK | HIL |
|---|---|---|---|---|---|---|---|---|---|---|---|---|---|---|
| 1 | (Uzbekistan) Pakhtakor | 4 | 3 | 1 | 0 | 6 | 1 | +5 | 10 | Advance to knockout stage | — | 2–1 | 3–0 | ~~0–0~~ |
| 2 | (United Arab Emirates) Shabab Al-Ahli | 4 | 2 | 1 | 1 | 3 | 2 | +1 | 7 | Advance to knockout stage | 0–0 | — | 1–0 | ~~1–2~~ |
| 3 | (Iran) Shahr Khodro | 4 | 0 | 0 | 4 | 0 | 6 | −6 | 0 | | 0–1 | 0–1 | — | ~~0–0~~ |
| 4 | (Saudi Arabia) Al-Hilal | 0 | 0 | 0 | 0 | 0 | 0 | 0 | 0 | Withdrew, results expunged (Note: Al-Hilal were unable to play their final match of the group stage against Shabab Al-Ahli due to having only 11 fit players after various team members tested positive for COVID-19. They were considered to have withdrawn from the competition, and their results were expunged.) | ~~2–1~~ | ~~23 Sep~~ | ~~2–0~~ | — |

Source: AFC
Rules for classification: Tiebreakers
Notes:

| 10 February 2020 1 | Al-Hilal (Saudi Arabia) | Voided (2–0) | (Iran) Shahr Khodro | Dubai, United Arab Emirates (Note: Matches between teams from Iran and Saudi Arabia were played on neutral venues due to deterioration of Iran–Saudi Arabia relations.) |
| 18:40 UTC+4 | Carrillo 45'; Gomis 69' | Live Report; Stats Report | Nemati (yellow card) 57' | Stadium: Zabeel Stadium; Attendance: 3,801; Referee: Ko Hyung-jin (South Korea) |

| 17 February 2020 2 | Shabab Al-Ahli (United Arab Emirates) | Voided (1–2) | (Saudi Arabia) Al-Hilal | Dubai, United Arab Emirates |
| 17:30 UTC+4 | Al-Naqbi (yellow card) 13'; Jaber 24', (yellow card) 75'; Hussain (yellow card) 68' | Live Report; Stats Report | Gomis 36', 72'; Al-Breik (yellow card) 65' | Stadium: Rashid Stadium; Attendance: 6,240; Referee: Hiroyuki Kimura (Japan) |

| 14 September 2020 (Note: On 9 July 2020, AFC announced new schedule for 2020 AFC Champions League group stage. On 16 July 2020, AFC announced that Qatar would host 2020 AFC Champions League in the West region from the group stage to the semi-finals.) 3 | Al-Hilal (Saudi Arabia) | Voided (2–1) | (Uzbekistan) Pakhtakor | Al Wakrah, Qatar |
| 21:00 UTC+3 | Al-Shahrani (yellow card) 26'; Giovinco 45+2'; Bahebri 90+7' | Live Report; Stats Report | Suyunov (red card) 64'; Derdiyok 70'; Ćeran (yellow card) 81'; Ismailov (yellow card) 90'; Komilov (yellow card) 90+3' | Stadium: Al Janoub Stadium; Attendance: 0 Referee: Ko Hyung-jin (South Korea) |

| 17 September 2020 4 | Pakhtakor (Uzbekistan) | Voided (0–0) | (Saudi Arabia) Al-Hilal | Al Wakrah, Qatar |
| 21:00 UTC+3 | Ismailov (yellow card) 45+1' | Live Report; Stats Report | Kanno (yellow card) 66' | Stadium: Al Janoub Stadium; Attendance: 0 Referee: Nawaf Shukralla Bahrain |

| 20 September 2020 5 | Shahr Khodro (Iran) | Voided (0–0) | (Saudi Arabia) Al-Hilal | Al Wakrah, Qatar |
| 18:00 UTC+3 | Ghazi (yellow card) 21'; Mansouri (yellow card) 67' | Live Report; Stats Report | | Stadium: Al Janoub Stadium; Attendance: 0 Referee: Ahmed Al-Ali (Jordan) |

| 23 September 2020 6 | Al-Hilal (Saudi Arabia) | Cancelled | (United Arab Emirates) Shabab Al-Ahli | Doha, Qatar |
| 21:00 UTC+3 | | Live Report; Stats Report | | Stadium: Khalifa International Stadium; Attendance: 0 Referee: Ahmed Al-Kaf (Oman) |

=== 2019 FIFA Club World Cup ===
| 14 December 2019 Second round | Al-Hilal (Saudi Arabia) | 1–0 | (Tunisia) Espérance de Tunis | Doha, Qatar |
| 17:00 (AST) | Cuéllar (yellow card) 39'; Gomis 73'; Kanno (yellow card) 83' (yellow-red card) 85' | Report | Derbali (yellow card) 60' | Stadium: Jassim bin Hamad Stadium; Attendance: 7,726; Referee: Roberto Tobar (Chile) |

| 17 December 2019 Semi-finals | Flamengo (Brazil) | 3–1 | (Saudi Arabia) Al-Hilal | Doha, Qatar |
| 20:30 (AST) | Bruno Henrique (yellow card) 20', (goal) 78'; Marí (yellow card) 45+1'; De Arrascaeta 49'; Al-Bulaihi 82' (o.g.); Diego (yellow card) 87' | Report | Al-Dawsari 18', (yellow card) 69'; Giovinco (yellow card) 45'; Al-Bulaihi (yellow card) 45+2'; Carrillo (red card) 83' | Stadium: Khalifa International Stadium; Attendance: 21,588; Referee: Ismail Elfath (United States) |

| 21 December 2019 Third place match | Monterrey (Mexico) | 2–2 (4–3 p) | (Saudi Arabia) Al-Hilal | Doha, Qatar |
| 17:30 (AST) | Urretaviscaya (yellow card) 31'; A. González 55'; Meza 60', (yellow card) 90'; Mejía (yellow card) 64' | Report | Carlos Eduardo 35'; Gomis 66' | Stadium: Khalifa International Stadium; Attendance: 19,318; Referee: Ovidiu Hațegan (Romania) |
| | Penalties |
| | J. González (penalty scored); Medina (penalty scored); Funes Mori (penalty scored); Vásquez (penalty missed); Cárdenas (penalty scored) | | (penalty scored) Gomis; (penalty scored) Giovinco; (penalty missed) Carlos Eduardo; (penalty scored) Jang Hyun-soo; (penalty missed) Kanno |

== Statistics ==
=== Appearances ===
Last updated on 28 November 2020.

| No. | Pos | Nat | Player | Total | | Pro League | | King Cup | | 2019 ACL | | 2020 ACL | | Club World Cup | |
| No. | Pos | Nat | Player | Apps | Goals | Apps | Goals | Apps | Goals | Apps | Goals | Apps | Goals | Apps | Goals |
Goalkeepers
| 1 | GK | (Saudi Arabia) KSA | Abdullah Al-Mayouf | 47 | 1 | 27 | 1 | 4 | 0 | 8 | 0 | 5 | 0 | 3 | 0 |
| 30 | GK | (Saudi Arabia) KSA | Mohammed Al-Waked | 4 | 0 | 3 | 0 | 1 | 0 | 0 | 0 | 0 | 0 | 0 | 0 |
| 31 | GK | (Saudi Arabia) KSA | Habib Al-Wotayan | 1 | 0 | 0 | 0 | 1 | 0 | 0 | 0 | 0 | 0 | 0 | 0 |
| 32 | GK | (Saudi Arabia) KSA | Abdullah Al-Jadaani | 0 | 0 | 0 | 0 | 0 | 0 | 0 | 0 | 0 | 0 | 0 | 0 |
| 40 | GK | (Saudi Arabia) KSA | Nawaf Al-Ghamdi | 0 | 0 | 0 | 0 | 0 | 0 | 0 | 0 | 0 | 0 | 0 | 0 |
Defenders
| 2 | DF | (Saudi Arabia) KSA | Mohammed Al-Breik | 33 | 2 | 18+2 | 1 | 4 | 1 | 5 | 0 | 1 | 0 | 3 | 0 |
| 5 | DF | (Saudi Arabia) KSA | Ali Al Bulaihi | 34 | 3 | 12+2 | 2 | 6 | 0 | 8 | 1 | 1+2 | 0 | 3 | 0 |
| 12 | DF | (Saudi Arabia) KSA | Yasser Al-Shahrani | 43 | 0 | 24+1 | 0 | 4 | 0 | 8 | 0 | 3 | 0 | 3 | 0 |
| 17 | DF | (Saudi Arabia) KSA | Abdullah Al-Hafith | 24 | 1 | 13+2 | 0 | 0+1 | 0 | 2+2 | 1 | 3 | 0 | 0+1 | 0 |
| 20 | DF | (South Korea) KOR | Jang Hyun-soo | 42 | 1 | 22 | 0 | 4 | 1 | 8 | 0 | 5 | 0 | 3 | 0 |
| 22 | DF | (Saudi Arabia) KSA | Amiri Kurdi | 11 | 0 | 4+1 | 0 | 2 | 0 | 0+1 | 0 | 3 | 0 | 0 | 0 |
| 23 | DF | (Saudi Arabia) KSA | Madallah Al-Olayan | 16 | 0 | 8+4 | 0 | 0+1 | 0 | 0 | 0 | 2+1 | 0 | 0 | 0 |
| 32 | DF | (Saudi Arabia) KSA | Muteb Al-Mufarrij | 0 | 0 | 0 | 0 | 0 | 0 | 0 | 0 | 0 | 0 | 0 | 0 |
| 54 | DF | (Saudi Arabia) KSA | Mohammed Al-Kunaydiri | 1 | 0 | 0 | 0 | 0 | 0 | 0 | 0 | 1 | 0 | 0 | 0 |
| 70 | DF | (Saudi Arabia) KSA | Mohammed Jahfali | 19 | 0 | 13 | 0 | 2+2 | 0 | 0 | 0 | 2 | 0 | 0 | 0 |
Midfielders
| 3 | MF | (Brazil) BRA | Carlos Eduardo | 28 | 15 | 19+3 | 12 | 3 | 2 | 0 | 0 | 0 | 0 | 3 | 1 |
| 6 | MF | (Colombia) COL | Gustavo Cuéllar | 34 | 0 | 24+2 | 0 | 5 | 0 | 0 | 0 | 0 | 0 | 3 | 0 |
| 7 | MF | (Saudi Arabia) KSA | Salman Al-Faraj | 31 | 2 | 15+4 | 2 | 2+1 | 0 | 7 | 0 | 2 | 0 | 0 | 0 |
| 8 | MF | (Saudi Arabia) KSA | Abdullah Otayf | 19 | 0 | 5+3 | 0 | 0+1 | 0 | 4+1 | 0 | 2 | 0 | 1+2 | 0 |
| 16 | MF | (Saudi Arabia) KSA | Nasser Al-Dawsari | 18 | 0 | 2+7 | 0 | 2+1 | 0 | 0+3 | 0 | 3 | 0 | 0 | 0 |
| 19 | MF | (Peru) PER | André Carrillo | 47 | 8 | 18+9 | 4 | 4+1 | 1 | 8 | 2 | 5 | 1 | 2 | 0 |
| 24 | MF | (Saudi Arabia) KSA | Nawaf Al Abed | 21 | 2 | 6+7 | 2 | 0+2 | 0 | 0+4 | 0 | 0+1 | 0 | 0+1 | 0 |
| 26 | MF | (Saudi Arabia) KSA | Fawaz Al-Torais | 1 | 0 | 0 | 0 | 0+1 | 0 | 0 | 0 | 0 | 0 | 0 | 0 |
| 27 | MF | (Saudi Arabia) KSA | Hattan Bahebri | 19 | 2 | 6+4 | 0 | 2 | 1 | 0+3 | 0 | 1+2 | 1 | 0+1 | 0 |
| 28 | MF | (Saudi Arabia) KSA | Mohamed Kanno | 38 | 1 | 14+6 | 1 | 3+1 | 0 | 5+2 | 0 | 3+2 | 0 | 1+1 | 0 |
| 29 | MF | (Saudi Arabia) KSA | Salem Al-Dawsari | 38 | 9 | 16+4 | 4 | 3 | 1 | 8 | 3 | 4 | 0 | 3 | 1 |
| 35 | MF | (Saudi Arabia) KSA | Mansor Al Beshe | 1 | 0 | 0 | 0 | 0 | 0 | 0 | 0 | 1 | 0 | 0 | 0 |
Forwards
| 9 | FW | (Italy) ITA | Sebastian Giovinco | 44 | 10 | 19+7 | 7 | 4 | 1 | 8 | 1 | 4 | 1 | 2 | 0 |
| 10 | FW | (Argentina) ARG | Luciano Vietto | 1 | 0 | 0 | 0 | 0+1 | 0 | 0 | 0 | 0 | 0 | 0 | 0 |
| 11 | FW | (Saudi Arabia) KSA | Saleh Al-Shehri | 25 | 7 | 4+16 | 4 | 3+1 | 3 | 0 | 0 | 0+1 | 0 | 0 | 0 |
| 18 | FW | (France) FRA | Bafétimbi Gomis | 48 | 40 | 25+4 | 27 | 1+3 | 1 | 8 | 7 | 4 | 3 | 1+2 | 2 |
| 33 | FW | (Saudi Arabia) KSA | Turki Al-Mutairi | 1 | 0 | 0 | 0 | 0 | 0 | 0 | 0 | 0+1 | 0 | 0 | 0 |
| 77 | FW | (Syria) SYR | Omar Kharbin | 21 | 7 | 7+9 | 6 | 2 | 1 | 0 | 0 | 0 | 0 | 2+1 | 0 |
Players sent out on loan this season
| 32 | DF | (Saudi Arabia) KSA | Mohammed Al-Dossari | 1 | 0 | 0 | 0 | 0 | 0 | 1 | 0 | 0 | 0 | 0 | 0 |
| 41 | MF | (Saudi Arabia) KSA | Thaar Al-Otaibi | 3 | 0 | 0+1 | 0 | 0+2 | 0 | 0 | 0 | 0 | 0 | 0 | 0 |
Player who made an appearance this season but have left the club
| 10 | MF | (Saudi Arabia) KSA | Mohammad Al-Shalhoub | 15 | 3 | 0+5 | 0 | 2+1 | 2 | 0+7 | 1 | 0 | 0 | 0 | 0 |
| 13 | DF | (Saudi Arabia) KSA | Hassan Kadesh | 8 | 0 | 6 | 0 | 2 | 0 | 0 | 0 | 0 | 0 | 0 | 0 |

=== Goalscorers ===
| Rank | No. | Pos | Nat | Name | Pro League | King Cup | 2019 ACL | 2020 ACL | Club World Cup | Total |
|---|---|---|---|---|---|---|---|---|---|---|
| 1 | 18 | FW | (France) | Bafétimbi Gomis | 27 | 1 | 7 | 3 | 2 | 40 |
| 2 | 3 | MF | (Brazil) | Carlos Eduardo | 12 | 2 | 0 | 0 | 1 | 15 |
| 3 | 9 | FW | (Italy) | Sebastian Giovinco | 7 | 1 | 1 | 1 | 0 | 10 |
| 4 | 29 | MF | (Saudi Arabia) | Salem Al-Dawsari | 4 | 1 | 3 | 0 | 1 | 9 |
| 5 | 19 | MF | (Peru) | André Carrillo | 4 | 1 | 2 | 1 | 0 | 8 |
| 6 | 11 | FW | (Saudi Arabia) | Saleh Al-Shehri | 4 | 3 | 0 | 0 | 0 | 7 |
| 6 | 77 | FW | (Syria) | Omar Kharbin | 6 | 1 | 0 | 0 | 0 | 7 |
| 8 | 5 | DF | (Saudi Arabia) | Ali Al-Bulaihi | 2 | 0 | 1 | 0 | 0 | 3 |
| 8 | 10 | MF | (Saudi Arabia) | Mohammad Al-Shalhoub | 0 | 2 | 1 | 0 | 0 | 3 |
| 10 | 2 | DF | (Saudi Arabia) | Mohammed Al-Breik | 1 | 1 | 0 | 0 | 0 | 2 |
| 10 | 7 | MF | (Saudi Arabia) | Salman Al-Faraj | 2 | 0 | 0 | 0 | 0 | 2 |
| 10 | 24 | MF | (Saudi Arabia) | Nawaf Al Abed | 2 | 0 | 0 | 0 | 0 | 2 |
| 10 | 27 | MF | (Saudi Arabia) | Hattan Bahebri | 0 | 1 | 0 | 1 | 0 | 2 |
| 14 | 1 | GK | (Saudi Arabia) | Abdullah Al-Mayouf | 1 | 0 | 0 | 0 | 0 | 1 |
| 14 | 17 | DF | (Saudi Arabia) | Abdullah Al-Hafith | 0 | 0 | 1 | 0 | 0 | 1 |
| 14 | 20 | DF | (South Korea) | Jang Hyun-soo | 0 | 1 | 0 | 0 | 0 | 1 |
| 14 | 28 | MF | (Saudi Arabia) | Mohamed Kanno | 1 | 0 | 0 | 0 | 0 | 1 |
| Own goal | | | | | 1 | 1 | 0 | 0 | 0 | 2 |
| Total | | | | | 74 | 16 | 16 | 6 | 4 | 116 |

=== Clean sheets ===
| Rank | No. | Pos | Nat | Name | Pro League | King Cup | 2019 ACL | 2020 ACL | Club World Cup | Total |
|---|---|---|---|---|---|---|---|---|---|---|
| 1 | 1 | GK | (Saudi Arabia) | Abdullah Al-Mayouf | 9 | 1 | 3 | 3 | 1 | 17 |
| 2 | 30 | GK | (Saudi Arabia) | Mohammed Al-Waked | 1 | 0 | 0 | 0 | 0 | 1 |
| Total | | | | | 10 | 1 | 3 | 3 | 1 | 18 |

Last Updated: 27 October 2020
