= Abdullah Al-Yousef =

Abdullah Al-Yousef may refer to:

- Abdullah Al-Yousef (footballer, born 1989), Saudi footballer for Al-Adalah
- Abdullah Al-Yousef (footballer, born 1997), Saudi Arabian footballer for Al-Fateh
