= Abdullah Al-Bladi =

Saudi Arabian footballer

Personal information
- Full name: Abdullah Hassan Al-Bladi
- Date of birth: October 14, 1993 (age 33)
- Place of birth: Saudi Arabia
- Height: 1.74 m (5 ft 9 in)
- Position: Forward

Team information
- Current team: Al-Omran
- Number: 29

Youth career
- Al-Fateh

Senior career*
Years	Team	Apps	(Gls)
2014–2021	Al-Fateh	13	(2)
2017–2018	→ Al-Nojoom (loan)		
2018–2019	→ Al-Washm (loan)	16	(1)
2019–2020	→ Al-Thoqbah (loan)		
2021–2022	Al-Nahda		
2022–2023	Al-Omran		
2023	Al-Sharq		
2023–	Al-Omran		
- * Club domestic league appearances and goals

Abdullah Al-Bladi (Arabic: عبد الله البلادي; born October 14, 1993) is a Saudi football player who plays a forward for Al-Omran.
