= Alkhaly Bangoura =

Guinean footballer

Personal information
- Full name: Alkhaly Bangoura
- Date of birth: 8 January 1996 (age 30)
- Place of birth: Kindia, Guinea
- Height: 1.76 m (5 ft 9 in)
- Position: Forward

Team information
- Current team: EGS Gafsa

Youth career
- 2003–2013: AS Mambo

Senior career*
Years	Team	Apps	(Gls)
2013–2018	Étoile du Sahel	58	(9)
2018–2019	Al-Fateh	13	(2)
2019–2020	La Louvière Centre	0	(0)
2020–2022	CA Bizertin	34	(3)
2022	JS Saoura	6	(0)
2023	CS Chebba	2	(0)
2023–	EGS Gafsa		

International career^{‡}
2016–2018	Guinea	10	(1)
- * Club domestic league appearances and goals as of 21 August 2023 ‡ National team caps and goals as of 21 August 2023

Alkhaly Bangoura (born 8 January 1996) is a Guinean professional footballer who plays for Tunisian Ligue Professionnelle 1 club EGS Gafsa and the Guinea national football team.

== Biography ==
As a 7-year-old boy, he joined AS Mambo of Kindia, founded by his brother Karim Bangoura, former member of the FC Satellite of Guinea and president of this informal club.

His first touches of the ball impressed more than one, and his talent made him the constant envy of the Guinean Ligue 1 clubs, but he remained in his training club. He was offered to test at the Étoile Sportive du Sahel. Without argument, they signed him in 2013.

Bangoura joined Belgian club UR La Louvière Centre in September 2019. In December 2020, he moved to CA Bizertin. In 2022, he joined JS Saoura. In 2023, he joined CS Chebba, then EGS Gafsa.

=== International goals ===
Scores and results list Libya's goal tally first.

No	Date	Venue	Opponent	Score	Result	Competition
1.	31 August 2017	Stade du 28 Septembre, Conakry, Guinea	Libya	3–2	3–2	2018 FIFA World Cup qualification
