= Hamad Al-Dawsari =

Saudi Arabian footballer

Hamad Al-Dawsari حمد الدوسري
Personal information
- Full name: Hamad Marshad Al-Dawsari
- Date of birth: 11 March 1994 (age 32)
- Place of birth: Saudi Arabia
- Height: 1.73 m (5 ft 8 in)
- Position: Left back

Youth career
- –2012: Al-Jandal
- 2012–2013: Al-Nassr

Senior career*
Years	Team	Apps	(Gls)
2013–2018	Al-Orobah	28	(0)
2018–2020	Al-Adalah	28	(0)
2020	→ Al-Ain (loan)	5	(0)
2020–2021	Al-Khaleej	5	(0)
2022–2023	Al-Arabi	0	(0)
2023–2024	Al-Zulfi		
- * Club domestic league appearances and goals as of 20 September 2020

Hamad Al-Dawsari (Arabic: حمد الدوسري, born 11 March 1994) is a Saudi Arabian professional footballer who plays as a left back.

== Career ==
Al-Dawsari began his career at Al-Jandal before joining the youth ranks of Al-Nassr in 2012. He spent just a year with Al-Nassr before joining newly promoted Pro League side Al-Orobah. Al-Dawsari spent 5 years with Al-Orobah spending two seasons in the top flight of Saudi football, the Pro League. On July 21, 2018, Al-Dawsari joined Al-Adalah, where he played an essential part in the club's promotion to the Pro League. On 2 October 2020, Al-Dawsari joined Al-Khaleej. On 19 July 2022, Al-Dawsari joined Al-Arabi. On 9 September 2023, Al-Dawsari joined Second Division side Al-Zulfi.
