= Medwin Biteghé =

Gabonese footballer

Personal information
- Full name: Medwin Biteghé
- Date of birth: 1 September 1996 (age 30)
- Place of birth: Gabon
- Height: 1.81 m (5 ft 11 in)
- Position: Midfielder

Team information
- Current team: Jeddah
- Number: 55

Youth career
- Cercle Mbéri Sportif

Senior career*
Years	Team	Apps	(Gls)
2015–2017	Cercle Mbéri Sportif		
2017–2018	Utenis Utena	8	(0)
2018–2019	US Tataouine	21	(1)
2019–2020	Al-Adalah	30	(2)
2021–2022	Al-Hilal Benghazi		
2022–2023	Al-Sahel	31	(4)
2023–	Jeddah	0	(0)

International career
2017–	Gabon	21	(0)
- * Club domestic league appearances and goals

Medwin Biteghe (born 1 September 1996) is a Gabonese footballer who currently plays as a midfielder for Saudi Arabian club Jeddah.

== Career ==
Biteghé played for Cercle Mbéri Sportif in the 2015 Gabon Championnat National D1. He led the club to the semi-finals of the 2016 Coupe du Gabon Interclubs. On 29 June 2022, Biteghé joined Saudi Arabian club Al-Sahel.

Biteghe played for the Gabon national football team on November 11, 2017, against Mali in a qualifying match for the 2018 FIFA World Cup a 0–0 draw at home at the Stade de Franceville.
