= Yassin Hamzah =

Saudi Arabian footballer

Personal information
- Full name: Yassin Hamzah Al-Nakhli
- Date of birth: September 27, 1990 (age 36)
- Place of birth: Madinah, Saudi Arabia
- Height: 1.77 m (5 ft 10 in)
- Position: Defender

Senior career*
Years	Team	Apps	(Gls)
2011–2015	Al-Taawon	50	(0)
2015–2018	Al-Ittihad	37	(0)
2018–2019	Al-Fateh	19	(0)
2019–2020	Al-Wehda	6	(0)
2021–2022	Ohod	45	(1)
2022–2023	Al-Ain	23	(0)
2023–2024	Al-Safa		

International career^{‡}
2015	Saudi Arabia	5	(0)
- * Club domestic league appearances and goals as of 19 August 2017 ‡ National team caps and goals as of 12:51, 17 April 2016 (UTC)

Yassin Hamzah (Arabic: ياسين حمزه) (born 27 September 1990) is a Saudi Arabian footballer who plays as a defender. He is a former Saudi Arabia international, having made his last appearance in 2015.

== Honours ==
Al-Ittihad

- King Cup: 2018
- Crown Prince Cup: 2016–17
