= Ibrahim Al-Telhi =

Saudi Arabian footballer

Personal information
- Full name: Ibrahim Mohammed Salem Al-Telhi
- Date of birth: 12 July 1994 (age 32)
- Place of birth: Saudi Arabia
- Height: 1.64 m (5 ft 5 in)
- Position: Winger

Youth career
- –2015: Al-Taawoun

Senior career*
Years	Team	Apps	(Gls)
2015–2017	Al-Taawoun	16	(2)
2017–2018	Najran	18	(2)
2018–2019	Al-Fateh	7	(0)
2019–2020	Al-Jabalain	12	(0)
2021	Al-Bukayriyah	6	(0)
2021–2022	Wej	11	(1)
2022	Ohod	12	(0)
2022–2023	Jeddah	6	(1)
2023	Al-Nahda		
2023–2024	Wej		
- * Club domestic league appearances and goals

Ibrahim Al-Telhi (Arabic: إبراهيم الطلحي; born 12 July 1994) is a Saudi footballer who plays as a winger.
