= Haider Al-Ameri =

Saudi Arabian footballer

Haider Al-Ameri حيدر العامري
Personal information
- Full name: Haider Maatoq Eisa Al-Ameri
- Date of birth: May 29, 1997 (age 29)
- Place of birth: Saudi Arabia
- Height: 1.72 m (5 ft 8 in)
- Position: Right back

Youth career
- 2011–2018: Al-Adalah

Senior career*
Years	Team	Apps	(Gls)
2018–2020	Al-Adalah	27	(0)
2020	→ Al-Bukayriyah (loan)	2	(0)
2020–2021	Al-Khaleej	20	(0)
2022–2023	Al-Rawdhah		
2023–2024	Al-Taraji		
2024	Al-Ula		
- * Club domestic league appearances and goals as of 25 January 2020

Haider Al-Ameri (Arabic: حيدر العامري; born 29 May 1997) is a Saudi professional footballer who plays as a right back.

== Career ==
Al-Ameri started his career with Al-Adalah where he was promoted from the youth team to the first team in 2018. Al-Ameri helped Al-Adalah reach the Pro League, the top tier of Saudi football, for the first time in the club's history. On 25 January 2020, Al-Ameri joined MS League club Al-Bukayriyah on loan until the end of the 2019–20 season. On 6 October 2020, Al-Ameri joined MS League club Al-Khaleej. On 6 February 2024, Al-Ameri joined Al-Ula.

== Honours ==
=== Club ===
Al-Ula

- Saudi Third Division: 2023–24
