= Nader Al-Muwallad =

Saudi Arabian footballer

Personal information
- Full name: Nader Salem Al-Muwallad
- Date of birth: July 23, 1992 (age 34)
- Place of birth: Saudi Arabia
- Position: Midfielder

Team information
- Current team: Hajer
- Number: 66

Youth career
- 2010–2013: Ohod
- 2013–2014: Al-Shabab

Senior career*
Years	Team	Apps	(Gls)
2014–2017	Al-Shabab	6	(0)
2015–2016	→ Al-Raed (loan)	14	(0)
2016–2017	→ Al Faisaly (loan)	17	(0)
2017–2018	Al-Faisaly	0	(0)
2018	Al-Orobah	7	(0)
2018–2021	Al-Adalah	51	(1)
2022–2023	Al-Diriyah		
2023–2025	Al-Qous		
2025–	Hajer		
- * Club domestic league appearances and goals

Nader Al-Muwallad (Arabic: نادر المولد; born 23 July 1992) is a Saudi professional footballer who plays as a midfielder for Hajer.

== Career ==
On 11 August 2023, Al-Muwallad joined Al-Qous.

On 6 August 2025, Al-Muwallad joined Hajer.
