= Abdullah Al-Humayan =

Saudi Arabian footballer

Personal information
- Full name: Abdullah Ali Al-Humayan
- Date of birth: July 24, 1988 (age 38)
- Place of birth: Saudi Arabia
- Height: 1.79 m (5 ft 10 1/2 in)
- Position: Midfielder

Youth career
- Hajer

Senior career*
Years	Team	Apps	(Gls)
2008–2011	Al-Rawdhah		
2011–2016	Al Jeel		
2018–2021	Al-Adalah	55	(0)
2021–2025	Al-Rawdhah		
- * Club domestic league appearances and goals as of 31 May 2021

Abdullah Al-Humayan (Arabic: عبد الله الهميان; born 24 July 1988) is a Saudi professional footballer who plays as a midfielder.

== Career ==
Al-Humayan began his career with the Al-Rawdhah and spent three years at the club. On 11 July 2011, Al-Humayan joined Al-Jeel. On 24 October 2016, he was suspended for a year and fined 300,000 riyals for manipulating the match against Al-Mujazzal. On 3 September, Al-Humayan joined the newly promoted MS League side Al-Adalah. After only one season with the club, he helped Al-Adalah get promoted to the Pro League for the first time in the club's history. On 9 June 2019, Al-Humayan renewed his contract with Al-Adalah.
