= Omid Mansouri =

Iranian footballer

Omid Mansouri ‌
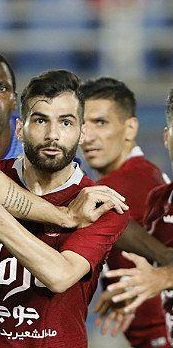

Personal information
- Date of birth: 22 April 1998 (age 28)
- Place of birth: Bojnord, Iran
- Height: 1.83 m (6 ft 0 in)
- Position: Centre-back

Team information
- Current team: Fajr Sepasi
- Number: 4

Youth career
- –2018: Shahr Khodro

Senior career*
Years	Team	Apps	(Gls)
2018–2021	Shahr Khodro	15	(2)
2021–	Fajr Sepasi	20	(1 AFC Champions League Caps:4)
- * Club domestic league appearances and goals

Omid Mansouri (born 22 April 1998) is an Iranian footballer who plays as a centre-back for Fajr Sepasi in the Persian Gulf Pro League
