= Mohammed Al-Moqahwi =

Saudi Arabian footballer

Personal information
- Full name: Mohammed Salman Al-Moqahwi
- Date of birth: February 11, 1995 (age 31)
- Place of birth: Saudi Arabia
- Height: 1.73 m (5 ft 8 in)
- Position: Goalkeeper

Team information
- Current team: Al-Nairyah
- Number: 73

Youth career
- ???–2015: Al-Adalah

Senior career*
Years	Team	Apps	(Gls)
2015–2024	Al-Adalah		
2023–2024	→ Hajer (loan)		
2024–	Al-Nairyah		
- * Club domestic league appearances and goals

Mohammed Al-Moqahwi (Arabic: محمد المقهوي; born 11 February 1995) is a Saudi professional footballer who plays for Al-Nairyah as a goalkeeper.

== Career ==
Al-Moqahwi started his career with Al-Adalah where he was promoted from the youth team to the first team, On 2015. Al-Moqahwi helped Al-Adalah reach the Pro League, the top tier of Saudi football, for the first time in the club's history. On 12 September 2023, Al-Moqahwi joined Hajer on a one-year loan.
