= Ali Al-Mazyadi =

Saudi Arabian footballer

Personal information
- Full name: Ali Ibrahim Al-Mazyadi
- Date of birth: September 24, 1985 (age 41)
- Place of birth: Saudi Arabia
- Height: 1.86 m (6 ft 1 in)
- Position: Goalkeeper

Youth career
- Al-Ittihad

Senior career*
Years	Team	Apps	(Gls)
2005–2012	Al-Ittihad	12	(0)
2013–2019	Al-Fateh	59	(0)
2019–2020	Al-Adalah	18	(0)
2020–2022	Abha	0	(0)
2022–2023	Al-Nahda		
- * Club domestic league appearances and goals as of 3 February 2018

Ali Ibrahim Al-Mazyadi (Arabic: علي ابراهيم المزيدي; born 24 September 1985) is a Saudi professional footballer who plays as a goalkeeper.

He played for Al Ittihad between 2007-2013 and for Al-Fateh between 2013-2019

== Honours ==
- Saudi Premier League (2): 2007, 2009
- Saudi Champions Cup (1): 2011
