= Ahmed Al-Nadhri =

Saudi Arabian footballer

Personal information
- Full name: Ahmed Eisa Al-Nadhri
- Date of birth: February 9, 1993 (age 33)
- Place of birth: Saudi Arabia
- Height: 1.73 m (5 ft 8 in)
- Position: Midfielder

Team information
- Current team: Al-Jeel
- Number: 7

Youth career
- Al-Rawdhah
- 2012–2013: Hajer

Senior career*
| Years | Team | Apps | (Gls) |
| 2013–2015 | Hajer | | |
| 2015–2018 | Al-Ittihad | 11 | (1) |
| 2016–2017 | → Al-Qadsiah (loan) | 8 | (1) |
| 2017–2018 | → Al-Fateh (loan) | 16 | (0) |
| 2018–2019 | Al-Fateh | 17 | (0) |
| 2019–2021 | Al-Adalah | 41 | (0) |
| 2022–2023 | Al-Rawdhah | | |
| 2023–2024 | Al-Ula | | |
| 2024–2025 | Al-Rawdhah | | |
| 2025– | Al-Jeel | | |

International career
| 2014–2016 | Saudi Arabia U23 | | |
- * Club domestic league appearances and goals as of 31 May 2021

Ahmed Eisa Al-Nadhri (Arabic: أحمد عيسى الناظري; born 9 February 1993) is a Saudi professional footballer who plays as a midfielder for Al-Jeel.

== Career ==
On 9 August 2023, Al-Nadhri joined Al-Ula.

On 26 January 2024, Al-Nadhri joined Al-Rawdhah.

On 16 August 2025, Al-Nadhri joined Al-Jeel.
