= Khalid Al Jubaya =

Saudi Arabian footballer

Personal information
- Full name: Khalid Fahad Al Jubaya
- Date of birth: August 1, 1999 (age 27)
- Place of birth: Saudi Arabia
- Height: 1.70 m (5 ft 7 in)
- Position: Forward

Youth career
- –2018: Al-Hilal

Senior career*
Years	Team	Apps	(Gls)
2018–2020	Al-Hilal	0	(0)
2019–2020	→ Al-Adalah (loan)	1	(0)
2020	→ Al-Shoulla (loan)	10	(1)
2020–2023	Al-Shoulla	90	(5)
2023–2024	Al-Faisaly	18	(0)
2024–2025	Al-Nojoom		
2025–2026	Al-Sharq		
- * Club domestic league appearances and goals as of 31 May 2021

Khalid Al Jubaya (Arabic: خالد آل جبيع; born 1 August 1999) is a Saudi professional footballer who plays as a forward.

== Career ==
Al Jubaya started his career with Al-Hilal and signed his first professional contract with the club on 24 January 2019. He made his debut for the first team during the AFC Champions League match against Emirati side Al-Ain by coming off the bench at the 87th minute. On 30 August 2019, Al Jubaya joined Al-Adalah on a season-long loan. He made 3 appearances for Al-Adalah in all competitions and his loan was ended early. On 31 January 2020, Al Jubaya joined Al-Shoulla on loan until the end of the season. On 5 August 2023, Al Jubaya joined Al-Faisaly. On 27 January 2025, Al Jubaya joined Al-Sharq.
