= Matías Aguirregaray =

Uruguayan footballer (born 1989)

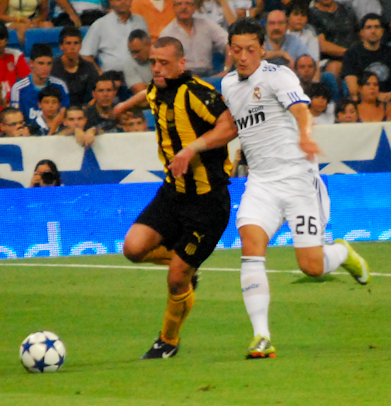
- Agguiregaray (left) with Peñarol in 2010

Personal information
- Full name: Matías Aguirregaray Guruceaga
- Date of birth: 1 April 1989 (age 37)
- Place of birth: Porto Alegre, Brazil
- Height: 1.77 m (5 ft 10 in)
- Positions: Right wing back; left back

Team information
- Current team: Montevideo Wanderers
- Number: 13

Youth career
- 2000–2007: Peñarol

Senior career*
Years	Team	Apps	(Gls)
2007–2010	Peñarol	66	(2)
2010–2011	Terrassa	0	(0)
2011–2012	Montevideo Wanderers	0	(0)
2011–2012	→ Palermo (loan)	12	(0)
2012	CFR Cluj	8	(1)
2013	Peñarol	14	(1)
2013–2017	Estudiantes	57	(9)
2015–2016	→ Peñarol (loan)	29	(5)
2017–2019	Tijuana	12	(0)
2018	→ Las Palmas (loan)	15	(0)
2018–2019	→ Al-Fateh (loan)	25	(1)
2019–2020	Al-Fateh	25	(2)
2021	Deportivo Maldonado	9	(2)
2021	Estudiantes	16	(0)
2022–2024	Peñarol	48	(0)
2024	Miramar Misiones	7	(0)
2024–	Montevideo Wanderers	10	(0)

International career
2009	Uruguay U20	9	(1)
2012	Uruguay Olympic	4	(0)
2012–2014	Uruguay	6	(0)
- * Club domestic league appearances and goals as of 3 May 2025

Matías Aguirregaray Guruceaga (born 1 April 1989) is a Uruguayan professional footballer who plays as a defender for Uruguayan Primera División club Montevideo Wanderers.

His nickname is "El Vasquito". He also holds a Spanish passport, allowing him to be counted as an EU player.

== Club career ==
Aguirregaray made his professional debut in 2007 with Peñarol and spent four full seasons with the club.

In October 2010 he joined Tercera División club Terrassa FC, in order to help him gain a Spanish passport to ease a potential move to a higher-rank team within Europe. He never played a single game with the Catalans.

On 24 August 2011, Serie A club Palermo confirmed to have signed Aguirregaray on loan from Montevideo Wanderers F.C., with an option to fully acquire the player's transfer right by the end of the season. He made his debut as a second-half substitute for Nicolás Bertolo in a Serie A home game against Cagliari, ended in a 3–2 win for his side.

In July 2013 he signed a contract with Argentine club Estudiantes de La Plata.

== International career ==
Aguirregaray took part at the 2009 South American U-20 Championship and the 2009 FIFA U-20 World Cup as part of the Uruguayan under-20 team.

He was part of Uruguay's 2012 Olympic squad.

In September 2012, he was called up to the Uruguayan senior side for two World Cup qualifying matches against Colombia and Ecuador, but failed to make debut. He finally made his debut to the senior squad in February 2013 in a 3–1 friendly loss against Spain, coming on as a substitute.

== Personal life ==
Matias is the son of former Peñarol player Óscar Aguirregaray.
