= Ahmed Al-Sultan =

Saudi Arabian footballer

Personal information
- Full name: Ahmed Ali Al-Sultan
- Date of birth: 22 July 1993 (age 33)
- Place of birth: Saudi Arabia
- Height: 1.66 m (5 ft 5 in)
- Position: Midfielder

Senior career*
Years	Team	Apps	(Gls)
2013–2017	Al-Fateh	0	(0)
2015–2016	→ Al-Diriyah (loan)		
2017–2019	Damac	55	(0)
2019–2023	Al-Adalah	75	(1)
2023–2024	Al-Bukiryah	29	(0)
2024–2025	Al-Jubail		
- * Club domestic league appearances and goals as of 31 May 2021

Ahmed Al-Sultan (Arabic: أحمد السلطان; born 22 July 1993) is a Saudi footballer who plays a midfielder.

On 26 July 2023, Al-Sultan joined Al-Bukiryah.
