= Murtadha Al-Burayh =

Saudi Arabian footballer

Personal information
- Full name: Murtadha Mohammed Al-Burayh
- Date of birth: July 10, 1990 (age 36)
- Place of birth: Saudi Arabia
- Height: 1.83 m (6 ft 0 in)
- Position: Centre back

Team information
- Current team: Hajer
- Number: 5

Youth career
- –2012: Al-Ettifaq

Senior career*
Years	Team	Apps	(Gls)
2012–2017	Al-Ettifaq	36	(1)
2013–2014	→ Al-Khaleej (loan)	24	(0)
2017–2018	Al-Watani	22	(3)
2018–2023	Al-Adalah	116	(4)
2023–2024	Al-Arabi	8	(1)
2024–2025	Al-Rawdhah		
2025–	Hajer		
- * Club domestic league appearances and goals as of 31 May 2023

Murtadha Al-Burayh (Arabic: مرتضى البريه; born 10 July 1990) is a Saudi professional footballer who plays as a centre back for Hajer.

== Career ==
Al-Burayh started his career with Al-Ettifaq where he was promoted from the youth team to the first team. On 24 July 2013, he joined First Division side Al-Khaleej on a season-long loan. After 5 years with Al-Ettifaq, Al-Burayh left the club and signed with Al-Watani on 15 July 2017. After Al-Watani's relegation to the Second Division, Al-Burayh joined newly promoted First Division side Al-Adalah. After just a season with the club, Al-Burayh helped Al-Adalah reach the Pro League, the top tier of Saudi football, for the first time in the club's history.

On 16 June 2023, Al-Burayh joined First Division side Al-Arabi. On 8 September 2024, Al-Burayh joined Al-Rawdhah. On 7 August 2025, Al-Burayh joined Hajer.
