= 2024–25 Al-Riyadh SC season =

Al-Riyadh
2024–25 season
- President: Bandar Al-Muqail
- Manager: Sabri Lamouchi (until 19 April); Bandar Al-Kubaishan (from 19 April)
- Stadium: Prince Faisal bin Fahd Stadium
- Pro League: 11th
- King's Cup: Round of 16 (knocked out by Al-Shabab)
- Top goalscorer: League: Faïz Selemani (6); All: Faïz Selemani (7)
- Highest home attendance: 8,914 v Al-Hilal; 14 September 2024; Saudi Pro League
- Lowest home attendance: 89 v Damac; 5 April 2025; Saudi Pro League
- Average home league attendance: 1,948
- All statistics correct as of 26 May 2025.

The 2024–25 season was Al-Riyadh's 72nd year in existence and their 25th non-consecutive season in the Pro League. The club participated in the Pro League and the King's Cup.

The season covers the period from 1 July 2024 to 30 June 2025.

== Players ==
=== Squad information ===
As of 1 February 2025

Note: Flags indicate national team as defined under FIFA eligibility rules; some limited exceptions apply. Players may hold more than one non-FIFA nationality.

No.	Pos.	Nation	Player
1	GK	SCO	Vincent Angelini
2	DF	KSA	Yazeed Al-Bakr
5	DF	FRA	Yoann Barbet
6	MF	KSA	Saud Zidan
7	MF	KSA	Mohammed Al-Aqel
8	DF	KSA	Abdulelah Al-Khaibari
10	MF	KSA	Nawaf Al-Abed
11	MF	IRQ	Ibrahim Bayesh
13	FW	BFA	Mohamed Konaté
16	MF	KSA	Talal Al-Shubili
17	MF	COM	Faïz Selemani
20	MF	POR	Tozé
21	MF	BRA	Lucas Kal
23	DF	KSA	Saud Tombakti
24	FW	KSA	Rayan Al-Bloushi
25	DF	KSA	Suwailem Al-Menhali

No.	Pos.	Nation	Player
27	DF	KSA	Hussain Al-Nowaiqi
28	MF	KSA	Bader Al-Mutairi
29	DF	KSA	Ahmed Assiri
32	MF	ARG	Luca Ian Ramírez
33	GK	KSA	Abdulmalik Al-Khaibari
40	GK	KSA	Abdulrahman Al-Shammari
43	MF	KSA	Bernard Mensah
50	DF	KSA	Nawaf Hawsawi
66	DF	KSA	Majed Al-Qahtani
77	FW	FRA	Sekou Lega
82	GK	CAN	Milan Borjan
85	FW	KSA	Talal Haji (on loan from Al-Ittihad)
87	DF	KSA	Marzouq Tombakti
88	MF	KSA	Yahya Al-Shehri
90	FW	KSA	Thamer Al-Dhafiri
99	MF	ROU	Enes Sali (on loan from FC Dallas)

=== Out on loan ===
Note: Flags indicate national team as defined under FIFA eligibility rules; some limited exceptions apply. Players may hold more than one non-FIFA nationality.

No.	Pos.	Nation	Player
15	MF	KSA	Nasser Al-Bishi (at Al-Najma until 30 June 2025)
—	GK	KSA	Abdulaziz Al-Awairdhi (at Al-Qadsiah until 30 June 2025)

No.	Pos.	Nation	Player
—	MF	KSA	Mohammed Sahlouli (at Al-Jabalain until 30 June 2025)

== Transfers and loans ==
=== Transfers in ===
Entry date	Position	No.	Player	From club	Fee	Ref.
13 July 2024	DF	–	(Saudi Arabia) Suwailem Al-Menhali	(Saudi Arabia) Al-Ittihad	Free	
13 July 2024	DF	87	(Saudi Arabia) Marzouq Tombakti	(Saudi Arabia) Al-Nassr	Free	
13 July 2024	FW	24	(Saudi Arabia) Rayan Al-Bloushi	(Saudi Arabia) Al-Safa	Free	
18 July 2024	MF	50	(Saudi Arabia) Nawaf Hawsawi	(Saudi Arabia) Al-Wehda	Free	
22 July 2024	MF	10	(Saudi Arabia) Nawaf Al-Abed	(Saudi Arabia) Al-Qadsiah	Free	
24 July 2024	GK	–	(Saudi Arabia) Abdulaziz Al-Awairdhi	(Saudi Arabia) Al-Okhdood	Free	
29 July 2024	DF	–	(Saudi Arabia) Yazeed Al-Bakr	(Saudi Arabia) Al-Hazem	Free	
2 August 2024	DF	14	(Saudi Arabia) Ziyad Al-Sahafi	(Saudi Arabia) Abha	Free	
11 August 2024	MF	–	(Saudi Arabia) Mohammed Sahlouli	(Saudi Arabia) Al-Nassr	$133,000	
18 August 2024	MF	11	(Iraq) Ibrahim Bayesh	(Iraq) Al-Quwa Al-Jawiya	Undisclosed	
18 August 2024	MF	17	(Comoros) Faïz Selemani	(Saudi Arabia) Al-Hazem	Undisclosed	
19 August 2024	MF	20	(Portugal) Tozé	(Saudi Arabia) Al-Hazem	Free	
19 August 2024	MF	21	(Brazil) Lucas Kal	(Brazil) Atlético Goianiense	Free	
20 August 2024	MF	43	(Ghana) Bernard Mensah	(Saudi Arabia) Al-Tai	Undisclosed	
21 August 2024	GK	82	(Canada) Milan Borjan	(Serbia) Red Star Belgrade	Free	
21 August 2024	FW	13	(Burkina Faso) Mohamed Konaté	(Russia) Akhmat Grozny	Free	
26 August 2024	DF	5	(France) Yoann Barbet	(France) Bordeaux	Free	
2 September 2024	DF	3	(Saudi Arabia) Abdulrahman Al-Hajeri	(Saudi Arabia) Al-Wehda	Free	
2 September 2024	MF	15	(Saudi Arabia) Nasser Al-Bishi	(Saudi Arabia) Al-Shabab	Free	
3 September 2024	GK	1	(Scotland) Vincent Angelini	(England) Brentford B	Free	
3 September 2024	DF	–	(Chile) Enzo Roco	(Saudi Arabia) Al-Tai	Free	
30 January 2025	MF	6	(Saudi Arabia) Saud Zidan	(Saudi Arabia) Al-Fayha	Free	
31 January 2025	FW	77	(France) Sekou Lega	(France) Lyon	Free	
2 February 2025	DF	23	(Saudi Arabia) Saud Tambakti	(Saudi Arabia) Al-Ahli	Free	

=== Loans in ===
Start date	End date	Position	No.	Player	From club	Fee	Ref.
8 January 2025	End of season	FW	85	(Saudi Arabia) Talal Haji	(Saudi Arabia) Al-Ittihad	None	
31 January 2025	End of season	MF	99	(Romania) Enes Sali	(United States) FC Dallas	None	

=== Transfers out ===
Exit date	Position	No.	Player	To club	Fee	Ref.
30 June 2024	DF	6	(Romania) Alin Toșca	(Italy) Benevento	End of loan	
1 July 2024	MF	15	(Saudi Arabia) Abdulhadi Al-Harajin	(Saudi Arabia) Al-Fayha	Free	
15 July 2024	DF	5	(Saudi Arabia) Khalid Al-Shuwayyi	(Saudi Arabia) Al-Bukiryah	Free	
2 August 2024	DF	12	(Saudi Arabia) Abdullah Al-Dossari	(Saudi Arabia) Al-Faisaly	Free	
3 August 2024	GK	1	(Saudi Arabia) Rakan Al-Najjar	(Saudi Arabia) Al-Okhdood	Free	
6 August 2024	MF	80	(Saudi Arabia) Fahad Al-Rashidi	(Saudi Arabia) Al-Orobah	Free	
9 August 2024	MF	20	(Gabon) Didier Ndong	(Iran) Esteghlal	Free	
11 August 2024	MF	11	(Zimbabwe) Knowledge Musona	(Saudi Arabia) Al-Okhdood	Free	
12 August 2024	FW	14	(Saudi Arabia) Saleh Al Abbas	(Saudi Arabia) Al-Okhdood	Free	
2 September 2024	DF	4	(Saudi Arabia) Mohammed Al-Shuwayrikh	(Saudi Arabia) Al-Shabab	$2,131,000	
11 September 2024	MF	60	(Mali) Birama Touré	(France) Montpellier	Free	
13 September 2024	MF	74	(Saudi Arabia) Abdulmohsen Al-Qahtani	(Saudi Arabia) Al-Safa	Free	
16 September 2024	DF	36	(Belgium) Dino Arslanagić	(Australia) Macarthur	Free	
20 September 2024	DF	99	(Saudi Arabia) Mutaz Ayash	(Saudi Arabia) Al-Washm	Free	
21 September 2024	MF	16	(Saudi Arabia) Saleh Al-Saeed	(Saudi Arabia) Al-Sadd	Free	
4 October 2024	FW	9	(Jamaica) Andre Gray	(England) Plymouth Argyle	Free	
12 January 2025	MF	26	(Saudi Arabia) Ali Al-Zaqaan	(Saudi Arabia) Al-Arabi	Free	
29 January 2025	DF	14	(Saudi Arabia) Ziyad Al-Sahafi	(Saudi Arabia) Al-Fayha	Free	
31 January 2025	DF	3	(Saudi Arabia) Abdulrahman Al-Hajeri	(Saudi Arabia) Al-Zulfi	Free	
31 January 2025	MF	18	(Saudi Arabia) Mohammed Al Aqeel	(Saudi Arabia) Al-Arabi	Free	

=== Loans out ===
Start date	End date	Position	No.	Player	To club	Fee	Ref.
2 September 2024	End of season	GK	–	(Saudi Arabia) Abdulaziz Al-Awairdhi	(Saudi Arabia) Al-Qadsiah	None	
2 September 2024	End of season	MF	–	(Saudi Arabia) Mohammed Sahlouli	(Saudi Arabia) Al-Jabalain	None	
31 January 2025	End of season	MF	15	(Saudi Arabia) Nasser Al-Bishi	(Saudi Arabia) Al-Najma	None	

== Pre-season and friendlies ==
30 July 2024 Friendly	Al-Riyadh (Saudi Arabia)	0–2	(Saudi Arabia) Al-Ahli	Seekirchen am Wallersee, Austria
18:30 CEST		Report	Demiral 21'; Mahrez 37'	Stadium: Sportzentrum Aug

6 August 2024 Friendly	Al-Riyadh (Saudi Arabia)	1–1	(Austria) Ertl Glas Amstetten	Amstetten, Austria
17:00 CEST	Al-Bloushi			Stadium: Union-Platz

14 August 2024 Friendly	Al-Riyadh (Saudi Arabia)	2–2	(Saudi Arabia) Al-Arabi	Riyadh, Saudi Arabia
19:00 AST			Quioto	Stadium: Prince Turki bin Abdul Aziz Stadium

== Competitions ==
=== Overview ===
Competition	Record							
Competition	Pld	W	D	L	GF	GA	GD	Win %
Pro League	34	10	8	16	37	52	−15	29.41
King's Cup	2	1	0	1	3	3	+0	50.00
Total	36	11	8	17	40	55	−15	30.56

Updated to match played 26 May 2025
Source: Competitions

=== Pro League ===
==== League table ====
Pos	Team	Pld	W	D	L	GF	GA	GD	Pts
9	Al-Kholood	34	12	4	18	42	64	−22	40
10	Al-Fateh	34	11	6	17	47	61	−14	39
11	Al-Riyadh	34	10	8	16	37	52	−15	38
12	Al-Khaleej	34	10	7	17	40	57	−17	37
13	Al-Fayha	34	8	12	14	27	49	−22	36

Source: SPL
Rules for classification: 1) Points; 2) Head-to-head points; 3) Head-to-head goal difference; 4) Total goal difference; 5) Total goals scored; 6) Fair-play points
(Note: Head-to-head record is used only after all the matches between the teams in question have been played).

==== Results summary ====
Overall								Home						Away					
Pld	W	D	L	GF	GA	GD	Pts	W	D	L	GF	GA	GD	W	D	L	GF	GA	GD
34	10	8	16	37	52	−15	38	5	5	7	16	22	−6	5	3	9	21	30	−9

Last updated: 26 May 2025.
Source: Saudi Pro League

==== Results by round ====
Round	1	2	3	4	5	6	7	8	9	10	11	12	13	14	15	16	17	18	19	20	21	22	23	24	25	26	27	28	29	30	31	32	33	34
Ground	A	H	H	A	A	H	A	H	A	H	H	A	A	H	A	H	A	H	A	A	H	H	A	H	A	H	A	A	H	H	A	H	A	H
Result	D	W	L	W	L	W	W	L	D	L	D	W	W	D	L	W	L	W	L	D	L	D	L	W	L	D	L	L	D	L	W	L	L	L
Position	8	6	10	8	10	7	4	6	6	9	9	9	7	7	9	7	8	7	7	7	7	8	9	9	9	9	9	9	9	9	9	9	9	11

Updated to match(es) played on 26 May 2025. Source: Saudi Pro League
A = Away; H = Home; W = Win; D = Draw; L = Loss

==== Matches ====
All times are local, AST (UTC+3).

Win Draw Loss Postponed

22 August 2024 1	Al-Wehda	3–3	Al-Riyadh	Mecca
21:00	Goodwin 40', 62'; Al-Hafith (yellow card) 83'; Khodari 90+4'; Noor (yellow card) 90+13'	Report	Mensah 51'; Al-Nowaiqi (red card) 59'; Tozé (yellow card) 71'; Al-Aqel (yellow card) 79'; Bayesh 85'; Kal 90+7'	Stadium: King Abdulaziz Sports City; Attendance: 670; Referee: Mohammed Al-Ismail

29 August 2024 2	Al-Riyadh	3–1	Al-Kholood	Riyadh
18:55	Jahfali 21' (o.g.); Al-Bakr (yellow card) 30'; Bayesh 75'; Al-Aqel 90+4'	Report	Hawsawi (yellow card) 28'; Al-Shamrani (yellow card) 45+12'; Collado 50'	Stadium: Prince Faisal bin Fahd Sports City; Attendance: 604; Referee: Sultan Al-Harbi

14 September 2024 3	Al-Riyadh	0–3	Al-Hilal	Riyadh
21:00	Kal (yellow card) 30'; Al-Khaibari (yellow card) 57'; Assiri (yellow card) 83'	Report	Koulibaly (yellow card) 24'; S. Al-Dawsari 53'; Cancelo (yellow card) 59'; Barbet 80' (o.g.); Mitrović 90+10'	Stadium: Prince Faisal bin Fahd Sports City; Attendance: 8,914; Referee: Tamás Bognár (Hungary)

21 September 2024 4	Al-Raed	1–2	Al-Riyadh	Buraidah
18:40	M. Al-Dossari (yellow card) 23'; Gonzalez (red card) 27'; Sayoud 71'	Report	Al-Menhali (yellow card) 70'; Selemani 80'; Konaté 90+5'; Al-Aqel (yellow card) 90+9'	Stadium: Al-Raed Club Stadium; Attendance: 1,658; Referee: Abdullah Al-Shehri

29 September 2024 5	Al-Fayha	2–0	Al-Riyadh	Al Majma'ah
18:30	Abdi (yellow card) 19'; Sakala 20'; López 35'; Shukurov (yellow card) 75'	Report	Assiri (yellow card) 19'; Al-Menhali (yellow card) 26'	Stadium: Al Majma'ah Sports City; Attendance: 390; Referee: Ahmed Al-Rumaikhani

4 October 2024 6	Al-Riyadh	2–1	Al-Qadsiah	Riyadh
18:15	Kal 24', (yellow card) 69'; Bayesh 59'; Tozé (yellow card) 88'	Report	Nández (yellow card) 57'; Al-Othman 79'	Stadium: Prince Faisal bin Fahd Sports City; Attendance: 1,123; Referee: Iván Barton (El Salvador)

20 October 2024 7	Al-Okhdood	0–1	Al-Riyadh	Najran
18:20	Koné (yellow card) 45+1'; Al-Muwallad (yellow card) 48'; Ferreira (yellow card) 50'; Khamis (yellow card) 55'	Report	Mensah (yellow card) 15'; Al-Khaibari (yellow card) 45+1'; Tozé 53'; Bayesh (yellow card) 90+7'	Stadium: Prince Hathloul bin Abdulaziz Sports City; Attendance: 447; Referee: Mamdouh Al Shahdan

24 October 2024 8	Al-Riyadh	0–1	Al-Ittihad	Riyadh
21:00	Al-Sahafi (red card) 28'; Al-Khaibari (yellow card) 45+1'; Assiri (yellow card) 66'	Report	Kanté 45+2'; Mitaj (yellow card) 48'; Aouar (yellow card) 69'; Al-Amri (yellow card) 84'	Stadium: Prince Faisal bin Fahd Sports City; Attendance: 7,853; Referee: Sami Al-Jires

1 November 2024 9	Damac	2–2	Al-Riyadh	Khamis Mushait
18:15	Stanciu (yellow card) 5'; Abdullah (yellow card) 17'; Diallo 42'; Al-Anazi (yellow card) 61'; Nkoudou 90+1' (pen.)	Report	Mensah 23'; Tambakti (yellow card) 45+2'; Assiri (yellow card) 46'; Selemani 68'	Stadium: Damac Club Stadium; Attendance: 2,576; Referee: Shukri Al-Hanfoush

8 November 2024 10	Al-Riyadh	0–1	Al-Nassr	Riyadh
20:00	Bayesh (yellow card) 38'; Al-Khaibari (yellow card) 51'	Report	Mané 41'; Haqawi (yellow card) 90+1'	Stadium: Prince Faisal bin Fahd Sports City; Attendance: 6,822; Referee: Nikola Dabanović (Montenegro)

24 November 2024 11	Al-Riyadh	0–0	Al-Ettifaq	Riyadh
17:40	Kal (yellow card) 38'	Report	Medrán (yellow card) 56'	Stadium: Prince Faisal bin Fahad Sports City; Attendance: 448; Referee: Ahmed Al-Rumaikhani

28 November 2024 12	Al-Fateh	1–2	Al-Riyadh	Al-Hasa
20:00	Al-Zaid (yellow card) 29'; Bendebka 45+3'; Al-Abdulwahed (yellow card) 45+9'; Saâdane (yellow card) 89'	Report	Al-Khaibari (yellow card) 2'; Assiri (yellow card) 45+1', (goal) 61'; Borjan (yellow card) 45+8'; Mensah 81'	Stadium: Al-Fateh Club Stadium; Attendance: 6,022; Referee: Khaled Al-Ahmari

6 December 2024 13	Al-Orobah	0–1	Al-Riyadh	Sakakah
17:55	Muhar (yellow card) 39'; Al-Qarni (yellow card) 57'	Report	Assiri (red card) 29'; Tozé 80'; Borjan (yellow card) 90+2'	Stadium: Al Jouf University Stadium; Attendance: 428; Referee: Abdullah Al-Kharboush

9 January 2025 14	Al-Riyadh	2–2	Al-Khaleej	Riyadh
18:00	Tozé 68'; Barbet 90+2'	Report	Hawsawi (yellow card) 34'; Fortounis 45'; Martins 80'	Stadium: Prince Faisal bin Fahd Sports City Stadium; Attendance: 315; Referee: Shukri Al-Hanfoush

15 January 2025 15	Al-Shabab	2–1	Al-Riyadh	Riyadh
18:05	Podence 72'; Hamdallah 90+7'	Report	Al-Shehri 56'	Stadium: Al-Shabab Club Stadium; Attendance: 3,085; Referee: Abdullah Al-Kharboush

21 January 2025 16	Al-Riyadh	1–0	Al-Taawoun	Riyadh
18:10	Barbet (yellow card) 68'; Konaté 90+11' (pen.)	Report	Al-Jumayah (yellow card) 17'; Al-Saluli (yellow card) 26' (yellow-red card) 90+13'; Mandash (yellow card) 59' (yellow-red card) 77'; Al-Ahmed (yellow card) 90+7'	Stadium: Prince Faisal bin Fahd Sports City Stadium; Attendance: 150; Referee: Mohammed Al-Ismail

26 January 2025 17	Al-Ahli	5–0	Al-Riyadh	Jeddah
18:45	Toney 4', 72' (pen.); Majrashi (yellow card) 45+4'; Demiral (yellow card) 49'; Al-Johani 60'; Firmino 63'; Mahrez 88'	Report	Al-Shehri (yellow card) 50'	Stadium: King Abdullah Sports City; Attendance: 13,522; Referee: Gustavo Correia (Portugal)

30 January 2025 18	Al-Riyadh	1–0	Al-Wehda	Riyadh
18:15	Tozé (yellow card) 45+1'; Al-Owaishir 65' (o.g.); Konaté (yellow card) 76'; Tambakti (yellow card) 81'; Al-Abed (yellow card) 84'	Report		Stadium: Prince Faisal bin Fahd Sports City Stadium; Attendance: 137; Referee: Shukri Al-Hanfoush

8 February 2025 19	Al-Kholood	3–2	Al-Riyadh	Ar Rass
16:55	Maolida 55'; Al-Hammami 57', 77'; N'Doram (yellow card) 65'	Report	Bayesh 1'; Tambakti (yellow card) 19'; Al-Aqel (yellow card) 80'; Konaté 88'; Hawsawi (yellow card) 90+1'	Stadium: Al-Hazem Club Stadium; Attendance: 1,358; Referee: Sultan Al-Harbi

14 February 2025 20	Al-Hilal	1–1	Al-Riyadh	Riyadh
20:00	S. Al-Dawsari 60'; Kanno (yellow card) 90+4'	Report	Konaté 45+1'; Mensah (yellow card) 87'	Stadium: Kingdom Arena; Attendance: 21,137; Referee: Iván Barton (El Salvador)

20 February 2025 21	Al-Riyadh	1–3	Al-Raed	Riyadh
20:00	Tozé 53'; Al-Shehri (yellow card) 79'	Report	Al-Amri 18', (yellow card) 72'; El Berkaoui 31', (yellow card) 71'; Normann (yellow card) 62' (yellow-red card) 71'; Tweh (yellow card) 64'; Sayoud 85'; Al-Dossari (yellow card) 90+13'; Sunbul (yellow card) 90+15'	Stadium: Prince Faisal bin Fahd Sports City Stadium; Attendance: 704; Referee: Mohammed Al-Ismail

26 February 2025 22	Al-Riyadh	0–0	Al-Fayha	Riyadh
18:30	Al-Nowaiqi (yellow card) 42'; Konaté (yellow card) 90+3'	Report	Al-Sahafi (yellow card) 40'	Stadium: Prince Faisal bin Fahd Sports City Stadium; Attendance: 148; Referee: Ahmed Al-Rumaikhani

2 March 2025 23	Al-Qadsiah	1–0	Al-Riyadh	Dammam
22:00	Álvarez (yellow card) 71'; Al-Othman 90+1'; Casteels (yellow card) 90+10'	Report	Konaté (yellow card) 34' (yellow-red card) 63'; Tozé (yellow card) 44'	Stadium: Prince Mohamed bin Fahd Stadium; Attendance: 4,048; Referee: Sergei Karasev (Russia)

8 March 2025 24	Al-Riyadh	1–0	Al-Okhdood	Riyadh
22:00	Al-Aqel (yellow card) 17'; Al-Khaibari (yellow card) 56'; Lega 85'; Sali (yellow card) 90+7'	Report	Pedroza (yellow card) 62'	Stadium: Prince Faisal bin Fahd Sports City Stadium; Attendance: 339; Referee: Shukri Al-Hanfoush

13 March 2025 25	Al-Ittihad	2–1	Al-Riyadh	Jeddah
22:00	Diaby 55'; Al-Nashri (yellow card) 69'; Al-Shehri 90+11' (pen.)	Report	Bayesh 81'; Haji (yellow card) 83'; Tambakti (yellow card) 90+3'; Assiri (yellow card) 90+9'	Stadium: Prince Abdullah Al-Faisal Sports City; Attendance: 18,720; Referee: Igor Pajač (Croatia)

5 April 2025 26	Al-Riyadh	0–0	Damac	Riyadh
17:15	Assiri (yellow card) 6'; Mensah (yellow card) 56'	Report	Al-Anazi (yellow card) 90+4'	Stadium: Prince Faisal bin Fahd Sports City Stadium; Attendance: 89; Referee: Abdullah Al-Harbi

12 April 2025 27	Al-Nassr	2–1	Al-Riyadh	Riyadh
21:00	Durán (yellow card) 19'; Ronaldo 56', 64'; Ângelo (yellow card) 87'	Report	Selemani 45+2'; Mensah (yellow card) 59'; Al-Khaibari (yellow card) 80'; Bayesh (yellow card) 82'; Assiri (red card) 90+4'; Tambakti (yellow card) 90+12'	Stadium: Al-Awwal Park; Attendance: 16,304; Referee: Erik Lambrechts (Belgium)

17 April 2025 28	Al-Ettifaq	1–0	Al-Riyadh	Dammam
18:40	Costa (yellow card) 29'; Hendry (yellow card) 43'; Vitinho 59' (pen.), (yellow card) 71'	Report	Tozé (yellow card) 39'; Tambakti (yellow card) 76'	Stadium: EGO Stadium; Attendance: 3,560; Referee: Khalid Al-Ahmari

23 April 2025 29	Al-Riyadh	2–2	Al-Fateh	Riyadh
18:55	Tozé 20'; Selemani 49'; Mensah (yellow card) 50'; Tambakti (yellow card) 89'	Report	Sbaï 45+2'; Bendebka 53'	Stadium: Prince Faisal bin Fahd Sports City Stadium; Attendance: 1,060; Referee: Faisal Al-Blwi

1 May 2025 30	Al-Riyadh	2–4	Al-Orobah	Riyadh
19:00	Haji 45'; Mensah 45+5'; Barbet (yellow card) 70'	Report	Al Somah 5', 58', 89'; Al-Qarni (yellow card) 42'; Abu Taha (yellow card) 45+3'; Al-Rashidi (yellow card) 81'; Guðmundsson 84'	Stadium: Prince Faisal bin Fahd Sports City Stadium; Attendance: 731; Referee: Mohammed Al-Hoaish

10 May 2025 31	Al-Khaleej	1–2	Al-Riyadh	Dammam
21:00	Martins 6', (yellow card) 9'; Al Salem (yellow card) 17'; Hawsawi (yellow card) 58'; Aboulshamat (yellow card) 90+12'	Report	Al-Khaibari (yellow card) 23'; Selemani 90+3'; Kal 90+14'	Stadium: Prince Mohamed bin Fahd Stadium; Attendance: 1,144; Referee: Sami Al-Jires

15 May 2025 32	Al-Riyadh	1–3	Al-Shabab	Riyadh
19:05	Mensah 29' (pen.), (yellow card) 77'; Assiri (yellow card) 32'; Zidan (yellow card) 55'; Bayesh (yellow card) 63'; Hawsawi (yellow card) 65'; Tozé (yellow card) 76'; Borjan (yellow card) 90+1'	Report	Al-Juwayr 15'; Hoedt (yellow card) 28'; Al-Shuwayrikh (yellow card) 39'; Camara 44'; Bonaventura (yellow card) 76'; Guanca 90+2'; Renan (yellow card) 90+6'	Stadium: Prince Faisal bin Fahd Sports City Stadium; Attendance: 824; Referee: Mohammed Al-Ismail

20 May 2025 33	Al-Taawoun	3–2	Al-Riyadh	Buraidah
19:20	Barrow 45+6' (pen.); Bahebri 86'; A. Al-Ghamdi (yellow card) 90+1'; Adam 90+5'	Report	Sali 34'; Selemani 40'	Stadium: Al-Taawoun Club Stadium; Attendance: 2,297; Referee: Fareeh Al-Jaloud

26 May 2025 34	Al-Riyadh	0–1	Al-Ahli	Riyadh
21:00	Assiri (yellow card) 24'; Selemani (yellow card) 49'	Report	Toney 16' (pen.); Balobaid (yellow card) 45+6'; Al-Buraikan (yellow card) 53'; Demiral (yellow card) 60'	Stadium: Prince Faisal bin Fahd Sports City Stadium; Attendance: 2,850; Referee: Andris Treimanis (Latvia)

=== King's Cup ===
All times are local, AST (UTC+3).

25 September 2024 Round of 32	Al-Safa	1–3	Al-Riyadh	Safwa
21:00	Asprilla 59'; Albu (yellow card) 70'; Fabinho (yellow card) 79'	Report	Selemani 19'; Hawsawi (yellow card) 25'; Al-Aqel 29', 66'	Stadium: Al-Safa Club Stadium; Referee: Khaled Al-Ahmari

28 October 2024 Round of 16	Al-Riyadh	0–2	Al-Shabab	Riyadh
17:50	Barbet (yellow card) 81'; Al-Khaibari (yellow card) 88'	Report	Camara 37'; Kanabah (yellow card) 68'; Bonaventura 90+3'	Stadium: Prince Faisal bin Fahd Sports City Stadium; Referee: Khalid Al-Teris

== Statistics ==
=== Appearances ===
Last updated on 26 May 2025.

No.	Pos	Nat	Player	Total		Pro League		King's Cup	
No.	Pos	Nat	Player	Apps	Goals	Apps	Goals	Apps	Goals
Goalkeepers
1	GK	(Scotland) SCO	Vincent Angelini	0	0	0	0	0	0
33	GK	(Saudi Arabia) KSA	Abdulmalik Al-Khaibari	0	0	0	0	0	0
40	GK	(Saudi Arabia) KSA	Abdulrahman Al-Shammari	2	0	1	0	1	0
82	GK	(Canada) CAN	Milan Borjan	34	0	33	0	1	0
Defenders
2	DF	(Saudi Arabia) KSA	Yazeed Al-Bakr	2	0	1+1	0	0	0
5	DF	(France) FRA	Yoann Barbet	32	1	28+2	1	2	0
8	DF	(Saudi Arabia) KSA	Abdulelah Al-Khaibari	31	0	29+1	0	1	0
23	DF	(Saudi Arabia) KSA	Saud Tombakti	1	0	0+1	0	0	0
25	DF	(Saudi Arabia) KSA	Suwailem Al-Menhali	9	0	3+5	0	1	0
27	DF	(Saudi Arabia) KSA	Hussain Al-Nowaiqi	21	0	16+4	0	1	0
29	DF	(Saudi Arabia) KSA	Ahmed Assiri	28	1	26+1	1	1	0
50	DF	(Saudi Arabia) KSA	Nawaf Hawsawi	11	0	5+5	0	1	0
66	DF	(Saudi Arabia) KSA	Majed Al-Qahtani	0	0	0	0	0	0
87	DF	(Saudi Arabia) KSA	Marzouq Tombakti	26	0	22+2	0	1+1	0
Midfielders
6	MF	(Saudi Arabia) KSA	Saud Zidan	8	0	3+5	0	0	0
7	MF	(Saudi Arabia) KSA	Mohammed Al-Aqel	22	3	5+15	1	2	2
10	MF	(Saudi Arabia) KSA	Nawaf Al-Abed	14	0	1+13	0	0	0
11	MF	(Iraq) IRQ	Ibrahim Bayesh	33	5	31+1	5	1	0
16	MF	(Saudi Arabia) KSA	Talal Al-Shubili	1	0	0+1	0	0	0
17	MF	(Comoros) COM	Faïz Selemani	30	7	25+3	6	2	1
20	MF	(Portugal) POR	Tozé	34	5	32	5	1+1	0
21	MF	(Brazil) BRA	Lucas Kal	31	3	30	3	1	0
28	MF	(Saudi Arabia) KSA	Bader Al-Mutairi	1	0	0	0	0+1	0
32	MF	(Argentina) ARG	Luca Ian Ramírez	0	0	0	0	0	0
43	MF	(Ghana) GHA	Bernard Mensah	30	5	26+3	5	0+1	0
88	MF	(Saudi Arabia) KSA	Yahya Al-Shehri	29	1	21+7	1	1	0
99	MF	(Romania) ROU	Enes Sali	8	1	2+6	1	0	0
Forwards
13	FW	(Burkina Faso) BFA	Mohamed Konaté	29	4	19+8	4	2	0
24	FW	(Saudi Arabia) KSA	Rayan Al-Bloushi	12	0	0+10	0	0+2	0
77	FW	(France) FRA	Sekou Lega	14	1	10+4	1	0	0
85	FW	(Saudi Arabia) KSA	Talal Haji	10	1	3+7	1	0	0
90	FW	(Saudi Arabia) KSA	Thamer Al-Dhafiri	0	0	0	0	0	0
Players sent out on loan this season
15	MF	(Saudi Arabia) KSA	Nasser Al-Bishi	0	0	0	0	0	0
Player who made an appearance this season but left the club
14	DF	(Saudi Arabia) KSA	Ziyad Al-Sahafi	6	0	2+2	0	1+1	0
18	MF	(Saudi Arabia) KSA	Mohammed Al Aqeel	8	0	0+6	0	1+1	0

=== Goalscorers ===
Rank	No.	Pos	Nat	Name	Pro League	King's Cup	Total
1	17	MF	(Comoros)	Faïz Selemani	6	1	7
2	11	MF	(Iraq)	Ibrahim Bayesh	5	0	5
2	20	MF	(Portugal)	Tozé	5	0	5
2	43	MF	(Ghana)	Bernard Mensah	5	0	5
5	13	FW	(Burkina Faso)	Mohamed Konaté	4	0	4
6	7	MF	(Saudi Arabia)	Mohammed Al-Aqel	1	2	3
6	21	MF	(Brazil)	Lucas Kal	3	0	3
8	5	DF	(France)	Yoann Barbet	1	0	1
8	29	DF	(Saudi Arabia)	Ahmed Assiri	1	0	1
8	77	FW	(France)	Sekou Lega	1	0	1
8	85	FW	(Saudi Arabia)	Talal Haji	1	0	1
8	88	MF	(Saudi Arabia)	Yahya Al-Shehri	1	0	1
8	99	MF	(Romania)	Enes Sali	1	0	1
Own goal					2	0	2
Total					37	3	40

Last Updated: 20 May 2025

=== Assists ===
Rank	No.	Pos	Nat	Name	Pro League	King's Cup	Total
1	17	MF	(Comoros)	Faïz Selemani	4	0	4
1	20	MF	(Portugal)	Tozé	4	0	4
1	43	MF	(Ghana)	Bernard Mensah	4	0	4
4	11	MF	(Iraq)	Ibrahim Bayesh	2	0	2
4	13	FW	(Burkina Faso)	Mohamed Konaté	1	1	2
4	21	MF	(Brazil)	Lucas Kal	2	0	2
7	5	DF	(France)	Yoann Barbet	1	0	1
7	8	DF	(Saudi Arabia)	Abdulelah Al-Khaibari	1	0	1
7	10	MF	(Saudi Arabia)	Nawaf Al-Abed	1	0	1
7	77	FW	(France)	Sekou Lega	1	0	1
7	88	MF	(Saudi Arabia)	Yahya Al-Shehri	1	0	1
7	99	MF	(Romania)	Enes Sali	1	0	1
Total					23	1	24

Last Updated: 20 May 2025

=== Clean sheets ===
Rank	No.	Pos	Nat	Name	Pro League	King's Cup	Total
1	82	GK	(Canada)	Milan Borjan	8	0	8
Total					8	0	8

Last Updated: 5 April 2025
