= 2023–24 Al-Riyadh SC season =

Al-Riyadh
2023–24 season
- President: Bandar Al-Muqail
- Manager: Yannick Ferrera (until 20 September); Odair Hellmann (from 8 October)
- Stadium: Prince Faisal bin Fahd Stadium
- Pro League: 14th
- King Cup: Round of 32 (knocked out by Al-Fayha)
- Top goalscorer: League: Saleh Al Abbas (8); All: Saleh Al Abbas (8)
- Highest home attendance: 8,618 (vs. Al-Ittihad, 24 August 2023)
- Lowest home attendance: 61 (vs. Al-Fayha, 26 September 2023)
- Average home league attendance: 1,861
- All statistics correct as of 27 May 2024.

The 2023–24 season was Al-Riyadh's 71st year in existence and their first season back in the Pro League following their promotion from the FDL in the previous season. The club participated in the Pro League and the King Cup.

This was Al-Riyadh's first season in the top flight of Saudi football since the 2004–05 season.

The season covered the period from 1 July 2023 to 30 June 2024.

== Players ==
=== Squad information ===
As of 1 February 2024

Note: Flags indicate national team as defined under FIFA eligibility rules; some limited exceptions apply. Players may hold more than one non-FIFA nationality.

No.	Pos.	Nation	Player
1	GK	KSA	Rakan Al-Najjar
2	DF	KSA	Amiri Kurdi
4	DF	KSA	Mohammed Al-Shwirekh
5	DF	KSA	Khalid Al-Shuwayyi
6	DF	ROU	Alin Toșca (on loan from Benevento)
7	MF	KSA	Mohammed Al-Aqel
8	DF	KSA	Abdulelah Al-Khaibari
9	FW	JAM	Andre Gray
11	MF	ZIM	Knowledge Musona
12	DF	KSA	Abdullah Al-Dossari
14	FW	KSA	Saleh Al Abbas
15	MF	KSA	Abdulhadi Al-Harajin
16	MF	KSA	Saleh Al-Saeed
18	MF	KSA	Mohammed Al Aqeel
19	DF	KSA	Saud Al-Bawardi

No.	Pos.	Nation	Player
20	MF	GAB	Didier Ndong
22	GK	KSA	Zaid Al-Bawardi
25	GK	URU	Martín Campaña
26	MF	KSA	Ali Al-Zaqaan
27	DF	KSA	Hussain Al-Nowaiqi
28	MF	KSA	Badr Al-Mutairi
29	DF	KSA	Ahmed Assiri
36	DF	BEL	Dino Arslanagić
40	GK	KSA	Abdulrahman Al-Shammari
60	MF	MLI	Birama Touré
66	MF	KSA	Majed Al-Qahtani
77	MF	KSA	Moayed Al-Houti
80	MF	KSA	Fahad Al-Rashidi
88	MF	KSA	Yahya Al-Shehri
99	FW	KSA	Mutaz Hibah

== Transfers and loans ==
=== Transfers in ===
Entry date	Position	No.	Player	From club	Fee	Ref.
1 July 2023	GK	25	(Uruguay) Martín Campaña	(Saudi Arabia) Al-Batin	Free	
1 July 2023	GK	40	(Saudi Arabia) Abdulrahman Al-Shammari	(Saudi Arabia) Al-Qaisumah	Undisclosed	
1 July 2023	DF	27	(Saudi Arabia) Hussain Al-Nowaiqi	(Saudi Arabia) Al-Khaleej	Free	
1 July 2023	MF	11	(Zimbabwe) Knowledge Musona	(Saudi Arabia) Al-Tai	Free	
1 July 2023	MF	15	(Saudi Arabia) Abdulhadi Al-Harajin	(Saudi Arabia) Al-Hazem	Free	
1 July 2023	MF	18	(Saudi Arabia) Mohammed Al Aqeel	(Saudi Arabia) Najran	Free	
22 July 2023	MF	60	(Mali) Birama Touré	(France) Auxerre	Free	
7 August 2023	GK	22	(Saudi Arabia) Zaid Al-Bawardi	(Saudi Arabia) Al-Shabab	Free	
7 August 2023	DF	2	(Saudi Arabia) Amiri Kurdi	(Saudi Arabia) Al-Wehda	Free	
7 August 2023	DF	29	(Saudi Arabia) Ahmed Assiri	(Saudi Arabia) Al-Faisaly	Free	
7 August 2023	MF	26	(Saudi Arabia) Ali Al-Zaqaan	(Saudi Arabia) Al-Fayha	Free	
7 August 2023	FW	14	(Saudi Arabia) Saleh Al Abbas	(Saudi Arabia) Al-Faisaly	Free	
12 August 2023	DF	36	(Belgium) Dino Arslanagić	(United Arab Emirates) Hatta	Free	
12 August 2023	MF	20	(Gabon) Didier Ndong	(France) Dijon	Free	
7 September 2023	FW	9	(Jamaica) Andre Gray	(Greece) Aris	Free	
9 September 2023	MF	24	(Saudi Arabia) Abdulmohsen Al-Qahtani	(Saudi Arabia) Al-Raed	Free	
22 October 2023	MF	88	(Saudi Arabia) Yahya Al-Shehri	(Saudi Arabia) Al-Raed	Free	

=== Loans in ===
Start date	End date	Position	No.	Player	From club	Fee	Ref.
20 July 2023	End of season	DF	6	(Romania) Alin Toșca	(Italy) Benevento	None	
20 August 2023	1 February 2024	FW	10	(Spain) Juanmi	(Spain) Real Betis	$1,100,000	

=== Transfers out ===
Exit date	Position	No.	Player	To club	Fee	Ref.
30 June 2023	FW	90	(Saudi Arabia) Omar Al-Ruwaili	(Saudi Arabia) Abha	End of loan	
1 July 2023	GK	23	(Portugal) Emanuel Novo	(Saudi Arabia) Al-Taraji	Free	
1 July 2023	DF	11	(Saudi Arabia) Fahad Al-Abdulrazaq	(Saudi Arabia) Al-Taawoun	Free	
1 July 2023	DF	32	(Saudi Arabia) Masoud Bakheet	(Saudi Arabia) Al-Jabalain	Free	
1 July 2023	MF	10	(Brazil) Diego Miranda	(Saudi Arabia) Al-Arabi	Free	
1 July 2023	MF	19	(Saudi Arabia) Nawaf Al-Habashi	(Saudi Arabia) Al-Hazem	Free	
1 July 2023	MF	22	(Brazil) Marcinho	(Brazil) Chapecoense	Free	
1 July 2023	MF	55	(Serbia) Miodrag Gemović	(Saudi Arabia) Al-Jabalain	Free	
1 July 2023	MF	88	(Brazil) Muralha	(Saudi Arabia) Al-Arabi	Free	
8 July 2023	MF	13	(Saudi Arabia) Ahmed Karenshi	(Saudi Arabia) Al-Orobah	Free	
9 July 2023	GK	35	(Saudi Arabia) Ibrahim Al-Hafith	(Saudi Arabia) Al-Rawdhah	Free	
10 July 2023	MF	49	(Saudi Arabia) Majed Al-Hantoushi	(Saudi Arabia) Al-Diriyah	Free	
13 July 2023	FW	9	(Serbia) Nikola Stojiljković	(United Arab Emirates) Dibba Al Fujairah	Free	
15 July 2023	DF	77	(Saudi Arabia) Saif Al-Qeshtah	(Saudi Arabia) Ohod	Free	
15 July 2023	FW	26	(Saudi Arabia) Abdulaziz Al-Aryani	(Saudi Arabia) Ohod	Free	
23 July 2023	MF	6	(Saudi Arabia) Abdulaziz Damdam	(Saudi Arabia) Ohod	Free	
19 September 2023	DF	44	(Saudi Arabia) Fahad Al-Munaif	(Saudi Arabia) Al-Suqoor	Free	
20 September 2023	GK	25	(Saudi Arabia) Hani Al-Nahedh	(Saudi Arabia) Al-Jubail	Free	
31 January 2024	FW	3	(Saudi Arabia) Abdulrahman Al-Yami	(Saudi Arabia) Ohod	Free	

== Pre-season ==
16 July 2023 Friendly	Al-Riyadh (Saudi Arabia)	3–1	(United Arab Emirates) Khor Fakkan Club	Khor Fakkan, United Arab Emirates
18:30 UAEST		Report		Stadium: Saqr Bin Mohammad Al Qassimi Stadium

22 July 2023 Friendly	Al-Riyadh (Saudi Arabia)	1–4	(Netherlands) Jong PSV	Eindhoven, Netherlands
14:00 CEST	Toșca	Report	Colyn; Uneken; Abed; Fofana	Stadium: De Herdgang

26 July 2023 Friendly	Al-Riyadh (Saudi Arabia)	1–0	(United Arab Emirates) Al-Nasr Dubai	Overasselt, Netherlands
18:00 CEST		Report		Stadium: Overasseltse Boys Stadium

30 July 2023 Friendly	Al-Riyadh (Saudi Arabia)	1–1	(Netherlands) VVCS	Maurik, Netherlands
16:00 CEST			Jalu	Stadium: Gemeentelijk Sportpark

5 August 2023 Friendly	Al-Riyadh (Saudi Arabia)	1–1	(Oman) Al-Nahda	Kalba, United Arab Emirates
18:15 UAEST				Stadium: Ittihad Kalba Stadium

== Competitions ==
=== Overview ===
Competition	Record							
Competition	G	W	D	L	GF	GA	GD	Win %
Pro League	34	8	11	15	33	57	−24	23.53
King Cup	1	0	0	1	1	2	−1	0.00
Total	35	8	11	16	34	59	−25	22.86

Updated to match played 27 May 2024
Source: Competitions

=== Pro League ===
==== League table ====
Pos	Team	Pld	W	D	L	GF	GA	GD	Pts	Qualification or relegation
12	Al-Raed	34	9	10	15	41	49	−8	37 (Note: Al-Khaleej finished ahead of Al-Raed on head-to-head points: Al-Khaleej: 4 pts, Al-Raed: 1 pts (Al-Khaleej 0–0 Al-Raed, Al-Raed 0–1 Al-Khaleej).)	
13	Al-Wehda	34	10	6	18	45	60	−15	36	
14	Al-Riyadh	34	8	11	15	33	57	−24	35	
15	Al-Okhdood	34	9	6	19	33	52	−19	33	
16	Abha (R)	34	9	5	20	38	87	−49	32	Relegation to Yelo League

Source: SPL
Rules for classification: 1) Points; 2) Head-to-head points; 3) Head-to-head goal difference; 4) Total goal difference; 5) Total goals scored; 6) Fair-play points
(Note: Head-to-head record is used only after all the matches between the teams in question have been played).
(R) Relegated

==== Results summary ====
Overall								Home						Away					
Pld	W	D	L	GF	GA	GD	Pts	W	D	L	GF	GA	GD	W	D	L	GF	GA	GD
34	8	11	15	33	57	−24	35	4	7	6	15	22	−7	4	4	9	18	35	−17

Last updated: 27 May 2024.
Source: spl.com.sa

==== Results by round ====
Round	1	2	3	4	5	6	7	8	9	10	11	12	13	14	15	16	17	18	19	20	21	22	23	24	25	26	27	28	29	30	31	32	33	34
Ground	H	A	H	A	H	A	H	A	H	H	A	A	H	A	H	A	H	A	H	A	H	A	H	A	H	A	A	H	H	A	H	A	H	A
Result	W	D	L	L	L	L	L	W	D	W	L	L	D	W	D	L	L	L	W	L	D	W	L	D	D	L	L	L	W	D	D	D	D	W
Position	7	8	9	11	15	16	17	15	13	11	12	14	14	12	13	14	15	16	15	15	15	14	15	15	14	14	14	15	14	14	14	14	14	14

Updated to match(es) played on 27 May 2024. Source: spl.com.sa
A = Away; H = Home; W = Win; D = Draw; L = Loss

==== Matches ====
All times are local, AST (UTC+3).

Win Draw Loss Postponed

13 August 2023 1	Al-Riyadh	1–0	Al-Wehda	Riyadh
21:00	Musona 17', (yellow card) 45+1'; Al-Nowaiqi (yellow card) 74'	Report	Al-Qahtani (yellow card) 60'	Stadium: Prince Faisal bin Fahd Stadium; Attendance: 1,419; Referee: Mamdouh Al Shahdan

17 August 2023 2	Damac	2–2	Al-Riyadh	Khamis Mushait
18:00	Al-Ammar 53', 90+10', (yellow card) 90+11'; Ceesay (yellow card) 75'	Report	Al Abbas 12', 35'; Al-Zaqaan (yellow card) 41'; Campaña (yellow card) 89'	Stadium: Damac Club Stadium; Attendance: 1,109; Referee: Abdullah Al-Kharboush

24 August 2023 3	Al-Riyadh	0–4	Al-Ittihad	Riyadh
21:00	Kurdi (yellow card) 45+1'; Al-Khaibari (yellow card) 64'; A. Al-Dossari (yellow card) 74'	Report	Benzema 17'; Hamdallah 25' (pen.), 45+10'; Al-Shanqeeti (yellow card) 87'; Al-Amri 90+3'	Stadium: Prince Faisal bin Fahd Stadium; Attendance: 8,618; Referee: Iván Barton (El Salvador)

28 August 2023 4	Al-Raed	3–0	Al-Riyadh	Buraidah
21:00	Fouzair 18', 45+2'; Sayoud 68'; M. Al-Dossari (yellow card) 76'; Al-Jayzani (yellow card) 84'	Report	Ndong (yellow card) 29'; Arslanagić (yellow card) 90+6'	Stadium: King Abdullah Sport City Stadium; Attendance: 3,870; Referee: Faisal Al-Blwi

1 September 2023 5	Al-Riyadh	0–1	Al-Okhdood	Riyadh
21:00		Report	Tawamba 55'; Tănase (yellow card) 90+2'	Stadium: Prince Faisal bin Fahd Stadium; Attendance: 133; Referee: Sami Al-Jires

15 September 2023 6	Al-Hilal	6–1	Al-Riyadh	Riyadh
21:00	Mitrović 30' (pen.); Abdulhamid (yellow card) 33'; Al-Shahrani 45+4'; N. Al-Dawsari 68'; Malcom 83'; S. Al-Dawsari 87' (pen.), 90+5'	Report	Touré (yellow card) 21'; Ndong (yellow card) 34'; Musona (yellow card) 40'; Juanmi (yellow card) 45+8'; Al-Zaqaan 90+6'	Stadium: Prince Faisal bin Fahd Stadium; Attendance: 15,373; Referee: Tamás Bognár (Hungary)

22 September 2023 7	Al-Riyadh	1–3	Al-Fayha	Riyadh
18:00	Al Abbas 80'; Al-Rashidi (yellow card) 90'	Report	Nwakaeme 17'; Sakala 63'; Sabiri 90+7'	Stadium: Prince Faisal bin Fahd Stadium; Attendance: 281; Referee: Abdulrahman Al-Sultan

30 September 2023 8	Abha	0–1	Al-Riyadh	Abha
15:00	Krychowiak (yellow card) 90'	Report	Arslanagić (yellow card) 12'; Gray 84'	Stadium: Prince Sultan bin Abdul Aziz Stadium; Attendance: 210; Referee: Mohammed Al-Daqqash

5 October 2023 9	Al-Riyadh	2–2	Al-Shabab	Riyadh
18:00	Gray 36', (yellow card) 54'; Al-Shuwayrikh (yellow card) 58'; Juanmi 73'	Report	Al-Sibyani (yellow card) 45'; Saïss 53'; Santos 87'	Stadium: Prince Faisal bin Fahd Stadium; Attendance: 1,684; Referee: Raed Al-Zahrani

22 October 2023 10	Al-Riyadh	1–0	Al-Ettifaq	Riyadh
18:00	Touré (yellow card) 7'; Al-Aqel (yellow card) 10'; Al-Shuwayyi 18'; Ndong (yellow card) 41'; Campaña (yellow card) 67'	Report	Gray (yellow card) 45+2'	Stadium: Prince Faisal bin Fahd Stadium; Attendance: 696; Referee: Ahmed Al-Rumaikhani

27 October 2023 11	Al-Tai	3–2	Al-Riyadh	Ha'il
18:00	Dugandžić 28'; Al-Shamlan (yellow card) 37', (goal) 45+2'; Semedo 40'; Cordea (yellow card) 89'	Report	Al Abbas 8'; Kurdi (yellow card) 89'; Touré 90+2' (pen.)	Stadium: Prince Abdul Aziz bin Musa'ed Stadium; Attendance: 3,270; Referee: Abdulsamad Bakri

5 November 2023 12	Al-Ahli	3–0	Al-Riyadh	Jeddah
21:00	Al-Buraikan 2'; Veiga 26'; Mahrez 52'	Report		Stadium: Prince Abdullah Al Faisal Stadium; Attendance: 10,094; Referee: Ramon Abatti (Brazil)

9 November 2023 13	Al-Riyadh	1–1	Al-Fateh	Riyadh
21:00	Al-Khaibari (yellow card) 29'; Al Abbas 68'; Al-Rashidi (yellow card) 90+7'	Report	Al-Hassan 34'; Saâdane (red card) 35'; Baattia (yellow card) 45+3'; Rinne (yellow card) 79'; Ali (yellow card) 90+9'	Stadium: King Fahd International Stadium; Attendance: 397; Referee: Abdallah Al-Shehri

24 November 2023 14	Al-Taawoun	1–2	Al-Riyadh	Buraidah
18:00	Pedro 4'; Adam (red card) 62'	Report	Al Abbas 72'; Al-Shuwayyi (yellow card) 83'; Al-Nowaiqi (yellow card) 90+4'; Touré 90+10' (pen.); Al-Shuwayrikh (yellow card) 90+11' (yellow-red card) 90+11'	Stadium: Al-Taawoun Club Stadium; Attendance: 3,611; Referee: Shukri Al-Hanfoush

30 November 2023 15	Al-Riyadh	0–0	Al-Hazem	Riyadh
18:00	Al-Khaibari (yellow card) 56'; Touré (yellow card) 61'	Report	Ricardo (yellow card) 77'	Stadium: Prince Faisal bin Fahd Stadium; Attendance: 264; Referee: Mohammed Al-Daqqash

8 December 2023 16	Al-Nassr	4–1	Al-Riyadh	Riyadh
21:00	Ronaldo 31'; Otávio 45+3'; Talisca 67', 90+4'; Yahya (yellow card) 88'	Report	Al-Shuwayyi (yellow card) 5'; Al-Rashidi (yellow card) 20'; Gray 68'	Stadium: Al-Awwal Park; Attendance: 17,047; Referee: Majed Al-Shamrani

16 December 2023 17	Al-Riyadh	0–1	Al-Khaleej	Riyadh
18:00	Arslanagić (yellow card) 53'; Al Abbas (yellow card) 74'; Assiri (yellow card) 87'	Report	Hawsawi 24', (yellow card) 39'; Jung Woo-young (yellow card) 81'	Stadium: Prince Faisal bin Fahd Stadium; Attendance: 144; Referee: Raed Al-Zahrani

24 December 2023 18	Al-Wehda	3–1	Al-Riyadh	Mecca
21:00	El Yamiq 36'; Al Hejji (yellow card) 73'; Goodwin 82'; Ighalo 90+4' (pen.)	Report	Assiri (yellow card) 28'; Al-Shuwayyi (yellow card) 45+3'; Al Abbas 86'	Stadium: King Abdul Aziz Stadium; Attendance: 668; Referee: Abdullah Al-Kharboush

28 December 2023 19	Al-Riyadh	1–0	Damac	Riyadh
18:00	Gray 51'; Juanmi (yellow card) 90+1'; Al-Khaibari (yellow card) 90+9'	Report	S. Hawsawi (yellow card) 12'; Stanciu (yellow card) 78'	Stadium: Prince Faisal bin Fahd Stadium; Attendance: 299; Referee: Ahmed Al-Rumaikhani

18 February 2024 20	Al-Ittihad	2–0	Al-Riyadh	Jeddah
20:00	Hamdallah 12', 90+7'; F. Al-Ghamdi (yellow card) 49'	Report	Al-Shuwayyi (yellow card) 82'; Al Aqeel (yellow card) 90+3'	Stadium: Prince Abdullah Al Faisal Stadium; Attendance: 11,864; Referee: Nazareno Arasa (Argentina)

23 February 2024 21	Al-Riyadh	1–1	Al-Raed	Riyadh
17:00	Assiri (yellow card) 45'; Al-Shuwayrikh (yellow card) 55'; Musona 82'	Report	El Berkaoui 38', (yellow card) 57'; Fouzair (yellow card) 89'	Stadium: Prince Faisal bin Fahd Stadium; Attendance: 292; Referee: Mohammed Al-Hoaish

1 March 2024 22	Al-Okhdood	1–2	Al-Riyadh	Najran
17:00	Godwin 74'; Pedroza (yellow card) 80'	Report	Musona 45+1'; Al Abbas (yellow card) 80'; Gray 87'; Al-Aqel (yellow card) 90+6'	Stadium: Prince Hathloul bin Abdul Aziz Sports City; Attendance: 828; Referee: Urs Schnyder (Switzerland)

8 March 2024 23	Al-Riyadh	1–3	Al-Hilal	Riyadh
17:00	Al-Bulaihi 52' (o.g.); Ndong (yellow card) 56'; Al-Shuwayrikh (yellow card) 63'; Campaña (yellow card) 66'; Musona (yellow card) 68'; Al-Shuwayyi (yellow card) 90'	Report	Abdulhamid (yellow card) 51'; Neves 66' (pen.); Michael 75'; Mitrović 90+3' (pen.)	Stadium: Prince Faisal bin Fahd Stadium; Attendance: 6,755; Referee: Wilton Sampaio (Brazil)

15 March 2024 24	Al-Fayha	1–1	Al-Riyadh	Al Majma'ah
22:00	Onyekuru 30'; Sakala (yellow card) 90+1'	Report	Gray (yellow card) 35'; Al-Shuwayyi (yellow card) 45+1'; Musona 64'; Al-Khaibari (yellow card) 75'	Stadium: Al Majma'ah Sports City; Attendance: 811; Referee: Ahmed Al-Rumaikhani

30 March 2024 25	Al-Riyadh	1–1	Abha	Riyadh
22:00	Al Abbas 70'	Report	Al-Zubaidi (yellow card) 5'; Kamano 26'; Abdulelah S. (yellow card) 67'; Al-Ali (yellow card) 89'	Stadium: Prince Faisal bin Fahd Stadium; Attendance: 194; Referee: Majed Al-Shamrani

3 April 2024 26	Al-Shabab	1–0	Al-Riyadh	Riyadh
22:00	Al-Shuwayyi 33' (o.g.); Al-Muwallad (yellow card) 90+1'	Report	Al-Zaqaan (yellow card) 90+2'	Stadium: Al-Shabab Club Stadium; Attendance: 4,317; Referee: Khaled Al-Teris

6 April 2024 27	Al-Ettifaq	1–0	Al-Riyadh	Dammam
22:00	Toko Ekambi 11'; Medrán (yellow card) 68'; Abdulrahman (yellow card) 90'	Report	Al-Shuwayyi (yellow card) 28'; Al-Shuwayrikh (yellow card) 89'	Stadium: Al-Ettifaq Club Stadium; Attendance: 3,573; Referee: Majed Al-Shamrani

19 April 2024 28	Al-Riyadh	1–2	Al-Tai	Riyadh
18:00	Al-Nowaiqi (yellow card) 31'; Al-Khaibari (red card) 52'; Al-Harajin 59'	Report	Al-Toiawy (yellow card) 29'; Semedo (yellow card) 31'; Mensah (yellow card) 41', (goal) 45+1'; Al-Shamlan (yellow card) 90'; Roco (yellow card) 90+9'; Al-Shuwayyi 90+12' (o.g.); Al-Nakhli (yellow card) 90+14'	Stadium: Prince Faisal bin Fahd Stadium; Attendance: 1,631; Referee: Faisal Al-Blwi

25 April 2024 29	Al-Riyadh	2–1	Al-Ahli	Riyadh
21:00	Touré 43' (pen.); Al-Nowaiqi (yellow card) 47'; Al-Harajin 84'; Ndong (yellow card) 89'; Assiri (yellow card) 90+6'	Report	Demiral (yellow card) 40'; Kessié 45+10'; Ibañez (yellow card) 51'	Stadium: Prince Faisal bin Fahd Stadium; Attendance: 5,813; Referee: Sami Al-Jires

2 May 2024 30	Al-Fateh	2–2	Al-Riyadh	Al-Hasa
21:00	Djaniny 6'; Al-Othman (yellow card) 15'; Baattiah (yellow card) 57'; Zelarayán 80'; Saâdane (yellow card) 90+3'	Report	Al-Shuwayyi (red card) 54'; Al-Shuwayrikh 90+1'; Ndong 90+4'	Stadium: Al-Fateh Club Stadium; Attendance: 6,954; Referee: Abdullah Al-Kharboush

9 May 2024 31	Al-Riyadh	0–0	Al-Taawoun	Riyadh
18:00		Report	Al-Kuwaykibi (yellow card) 52'	Stadium: Prince Faisal bin Fahd Stadium; Attendance: 1,146; Referee: Mohammed Al-Hoaish

18 May 2024 32	Al-Hazem	1–1	Al-Riyadh	Ar Rass
19:20	Ricardo 90+8'	Report	Viana 50' (o.g.); A. Al-Dossari (yellow card) 90+4'; Al Aqeel (yellow card) 90+12'; Touré (yellow card) 90+12'	Stadium: Al-Hazem Club Stadium; Attendance: 305; Referee: Majed Al-Shamrani

23 May 2024 33	Al-Riyadh	2–2	Al-Nassr	Riyadh
21:00	Gray 26'; Al-Aqel 45+1'; Al-Shuwayyi (yellow card) 50'; Ndong (yellow card) 85'	Report	Otávio 15'; Telles (yellow card) 45+10'; Laporte (red card) 63'; Al-Nemer 90+7'	Stadium: Prince Faisal bin Fahd Stadium; Attendance: 1,876; Referee: Khaled Al-Teris

27 May 2024 34	Al-Khaleej	1–2	Al-Riyadh	Dammam
21:00	Masoud (yellow card) 67'; Al Salem 87' (pen.); Rodrigues (yellow card) 90+6'	Report	Assiri (yellow card) 45+2'; Al-Shuwayrikh (yellow card) 46'; Touré 68' (pen.); Gray 74', (yellow card) 83'	Stadium: Prince Mohamed bin Fahd Stadium; Attendance: 1,500; Referee: Sami Al-Jires

=== King Cup ===
All times are local, AST (UTC+3).

26 September 2023 Round of 32	Al-Riyadh	1–2	Al-Fayha	Riyadh
18:00	Ndong 16'; Kurdi (yellow card) 42'; Gray (yellow card) 90+11'	Report	Al-Abdulmenem 19', 45+3'; R. Kaabi (yellow card) 44'; Sabiri (yellow card) 84'; Al-Rashidi (yellow card) 90+11'	Stadium: Prince Faisal bin Fahd Stadium; Attendance: 61; Referee: Mohammed Al-Harbi

== Statistics ==
=== Appearances ===
Last updated on 27 May 2024.

No.	Pos	Nat	Player	Total		Pro League		King Cup	
No.	Pos	Nat	Player	Apps	Goals	Apps	Goals	Apps	Goals
Goalkeepers
1	GK	(Saudi Arabia) KSA	Rakan Al-Najjar	1	0	0+1	0	0	0
22	GK	(Saudi Arabia) KSA	Zaid Al-Bawardi	0	0	0	0	0	0
25	GK	(Uruguay) URU	Martín Campaña	34	0	33	0	1	0
40	GK	(Saudi Arabia) KSA	Abdulrahman Al-Shammari	2	0	1+1	0	0	0
Defenders
2	DF	(Saudi Arabia) KSA	Amiri Kurdi	12	0	2+9	0	1	0
4	DF	(Saudi Arabia) KSA	Mohammed Al-Shwirekh	23	1	23	1	0	0
5	DF	(Saudi Arabia) KSA	Khalid Al-Shuwayyi	30	1	23+6	1	1	0
6	DF	(Romania) ROU	Alin Toșca	12	0	10+1	0	1	0
8	DF	(Saudi Arabia) KSA	Abdulelah Al-Khaibari	28	0	27+1	0	0	0
12	DF	(Saudi Arabia) KSA	Abdullah Al-Dossari	19	0	10+8	0	0+1	0
19	DF	(Saudi Arabia) KSA	Saud Al-Bawardi	0	0	0	0	0	0
27	DF	(Saudi Arabia) KSA	Hussain Al-Nowaiqi	20	0	17+3	0	0	0
29	DF	(Saudi Arabia) KSA	Ahmed Assiri	22	0	21+1	0	0	0
36	DF	(Belgium) BEL	Dino Arslanagić	25	0	19+5	0	1	0
Midfielders
7	MF	(Saudi Arabia) KSA	Mohammed Al-Aqel	17	1	7+10	1	0	0
11	MF	(Zimbabwe) ZIM	Knowledge Musona	23	4	20+2	4	1	0
15	MF	(Saudi Arabia) KSA	Abdulhadi Al-Harajin	30	2	14+15	2	0+1	0
16	MF	(Saudi Arabia) KSA	Saleh Al-Saeed	1	0	0+1	0	0	0
18	MF	(Saudi Arabia) KSA	Mohammed Al Aqeel	10	0	0+9	0	0+1	0
20	MF	(Gabon) GAB	Didier Ndong	31	2	29+1	1	1	1
26	MF	(Saudi Arabia) KSA	Ali Al-Zaqaan	19	1	3+15	1	0+1	0
28	MF	(Saudi Arabia) KSA	Badr Al-Mutairi	0	0	0	0	0	0
60	MF	(Mali) MLI	Birama Touré	34	4	33	4	1	0
66	MF	(Saudi Arabia) KSA	Majed Al-Qahtani	0	0	0	0	0	0
77	MF	(Saudi Arabia) KSA	Moayed Al-Houti	4	0	0+4	0	0	0
80	MF	(Saudi Arabia) KSA	Fahad Al-Rashidi	28	0	13+14	0	1	0
88	MF	(Saudi Arabia) KSA	Yahya Al-Shehri	23	0	17+6	0	0	0
Forwards
9	FW	(Jamaica) JAM	Andre Gray	27	7	21+5	7	0+1	0
14	FW	(Saudi Arabia) KSA	Saleh Al Abbas	28	8	18+9	8	1	0
99	FW	(Saudi Arabia) KSA	Mutaz Hibah	0	0	0	0	0	0
Player who made an appearance this season but have left the club
3	FW	(Saudi Arabia) KSA	Abdulrahman Al-Yami	4	0	0+4	0	0	0
10	FW	(Spain) ESP	Juanmi	17	1	13+3	1	1	0
44	DF	(Saudi Arabia) KSA	Fahad Al-Munaif	0	0	0	0	0	0

=== Goalscorers ===
Rank	No.	Pos	Nat	Name	Pro League	King Cup	Total
1	14	FW	(Saudi Arabia)	Saleh Al Abbas	8	0	8
2	9	FW	(Jamaica)	Andre Gray	7	0	7
3	11	MF	(Zimbabwe)	Knowledge Musona	4	0	4
3	60	MF	(Mali)	Birama Touré	4	0	4
5	15	MF	(Saudi Arabia)	Abdulhadi Al-Harajin	2	0	2
5	20	MF	(Gabon)	Didier Ndong	1	1	2
7	4	DF	(Saudi Arabia)	Mohammed Al-Shwirekh	1	0	1
7	5	DF	(Saudi Arabia)	Khalid Al-Shuwayyi	1	0	1
7	7	MF	(Saudi Arabia)	Mohammed Al-Aqel	1	0	1
7	10	FW	(Spain)	Juanmi	1	0	1
7	26	MF	(Saudi Arabia)	Ali Al-Zaqaan	1	0	1
Own goal					2	0	2
Total					33	1	34

Last Updated: 27 May 2024

=== Assists ===
Rank	No.	Pos	Nat	Name	Pro League	King Cup	Total
1	88	MF	(Saudi Arabia)	Yahya Al-Shehri	4	0	4
2	14	FW	(Saudi Arabia)	Saleh Al Abbas	3	0	3
3	8	DF	(Saudi Arabia)	Abdulelah Al-Khaibari	2	0	2
3	9	FW	(Jamaica)	Andre Gray	2	0	2
3	10	FW	(Spain)	Juanmi	2	0	2
3	11	MF	(Zimbabwe)	Knowledge Musona	2	0	2
7	6	DF	(Romania)	Alin Toșca	1	0	1
7	7	MF	(Saudi Arabia)	Mohammed Al-Aqel	1	0	1
7	20	MF	(Gabon)	Didier Ndong	1	0	1
7	26	MF	(Saudi Arabia)	Ali Al-Zaqaan	1	0	1
7	36	DF	(Belgium)	Dino Arslanagić	0	1	1
Total					19	1	20

Last Updated: 27 May 2024

=== Clean sheets ===
Rank	No.	Pos	Nat	Name	Pro League	King Cup	Total
1	25	GK	(Uruguay)	Martín Campaña	6	0	6
Total					6	0	6

Last Updated: 9 May 2024
