= 2024–25 Saudi Pro League =

Saudi Pro League
- Season: 2024–25
- Dates: 22 August 2024 – 26 May 2025
- Champions: Al-Ittihad (14th title)
- Relegated: Al-Wehda; Al-Orobah; Al-Raed
- AFC Champions League Elite: Al-Ittihad; Al-Hilal; Al-Ahli
- AFC Champions League Two: Al-Nassr
- AGCFF Gulf Club Champions League: Al-Shabab
- Matches: 306
- Goals: 895 (2.92 per match)
- Top goalscorer: Cristiano Ronaldo (25 goals)
- Biggest home win: Al-Hilal 9–0 Al-Fateh (16 January 2025)
- Biggest away win: Al-Okhdood 0–9 Al-Nassr (12 May 2025)
- Highest scoring: Al-Hilal 9–0 Al-Fateh (16 January 2025); Al-Okhdood 0–9 Al-Nassr (12 May 2025)
- Longest winning run: 9 matches Al-Ittihad
- Longest unbeaten run: 12 matches Al-Ittihad
- Longest winless run: 13 matches Al-Fateh
- Longest losing run: 9 matches Al-Raed
- Highest attendance: 58,117; Al-Ittihad 1–0 Damac (26 May 2025)
- Lowest attendance: 85; Al-Orobah 3–2 Al-Taawoun (26 May 2025)
- Total attendance: 2,556,572
- Average attendance: 8,355

The 2024–25 Saudi Pro League (known as the Roshn Saudi League for sponsorship reasons) was the 68th edition of the top-tier Saudi football league, established in 1976, and the 17th edition since it was rebranded as the Saudi Pro League in 2008.

Al-Hilal were the defending champions, having won their record-extending 21st title last season. Al-Kholood, Al-Orobah, and Al-Qadsiah joined as the three promoted clubs. They replaced Abha, Al-Hazem, and Al-Tai who were relegated to the 2024–25 Saudi First Division League.

== Overview ==
=== Changes ===
Starting this season, each club could have a squad of 25 players with ten foreigners; eight of them could be of any age, and two had to be under 21 at the time of signing. Fifteen Saudi players of any age, and five could be called up from the youth sector if needed or wanted. For each league match, managers could select eight of the ten foreigners to be included in the squad.

Unlike the previous years where the goal of the week was voted on Twitter with no physical award, starting this season the voting was held at the league website with awards for the winners presented by BSF, one of the league sponsors. Additionally, two new awards were introduced: the skill of the week and save of the week, with voting also conducted on the league website. However, these new awards were inconsistent; during some weeks there was voting, while other weeks there was not, and neither of these new awards included a physical prize.

This season witnessed the biggest sale in Saudi Pro League history, with Al-Nassr selling Seko Fofana for €20,000,000 to French club Rennais, making it the biggest sale outside the Saudi Pro League, although higher sales had previously been made within the league itself.

== Teams ==
Locations of teams in the 2024–25 Saudi Pro League

18 teams competed in the league – the top 15 teams from the previous season and the 3 teams promoted from the FD League.

=== Teams who were promoted to the Pro League ===
On 6 May 2024, Al-Qadsiah became the first team to be promoted following a 2–2 draw with Ohod. They were crowned champions following a 4–2 win against Al-Najma on 13 May 2024. Al-Qadsiah returned to the top flight after an absence of three seasons and played in their 37th season in the top flight.

On 21 May 2024, Al-Kholood and Al-Orobah became the final two clubs to be promoted. Al-Kholood were promoted following a 5–1 win against Al-Safa. Al-Kholood played in the top flight of Saudi football for the first time in history and became the 38th side to participate in the Saudi Pro League since its inception.

Al-Orobah were promoted following a 1–0 win against Al-Jabalain. Al-Orobah returned to the top flight for the first time since getting relegated in the 2014–15 season and played in their 3rd season in the top flight.

=== Teams who were relegated to the FD League ===
Al-Hazem were the first team to be relegated following a 4–1 home defeat to Al-Hilal on 11 May 2024. Al-Hazem were relegated after just one year in the top flight. This was their third relegation in five years.

Both Abha and Al-Tai were relegated on the final day of the season. Abha were relegated following a 2–1 defeat away to Al-Hazem. Abha were relegated after five consecutive seasons in the Pro League.

Al-Tai were relegated following a 2–0 home defeat to Al-Okhdood. Al-Tai were relegated after three consecutive seasons in the top flight.

=== Stadia ===
Note: Table lists in alphabetical order.

Team	Location	Stadium	Capacity
Al-Ahli	Jeddah	King Abdullah Sports City	60,342
Al-Ettifaq	Dammam	E'GO STADIUM	12,924
Al-Fateh	Al-Mubarraz	Al-Fateh Stadium	11,851
Al-Fayha	Al-Majma'ah	Al-Majma'ah Sports City Stadium	6,843
Al-Hilal	Riyadh	Kingdom Arena	26,090
Al-Ittihad	Jeddah	King Abdullah Sports City	60,342
Al-Khaleej	Dammam	Prince Mohamed bin Fahd Stadium	17,300
Al-Kholood	Ar Rass	Al-Hazem Club Stadium	5,100
Al-Nassr	Riyadh	Al-Awwal Park	26,004
Al-Okhdood	Najran	Prince Hathloul bin Abdul Aziz Sports City	12,000
Al-Orobah	Sakakah	Al-Jouf University Stadium	8,130
Al-Qadsiah	Dammam	Prince Mohamed bin Fahd Stadium	17,300
Al-Raed	Buraidah	King Abdullah Sports City Stadium (Buraidah)	25,000
Al-Riyadh	Riyadh	Prince Faisal bin Fahd Stadium	18,063
Al-Shabab	Riyadh	Al-Shabab Club Stadium	13,537
Al-Taawoun	Buraidah	King Abdullah Sports City Stadium (Buraidah)	25,000
Al-Wehda	Mecca	King Abdulaziz Sports City Stadium	27,672
Damac	Khamis Mushait	Damac Club Stadium	3,800

=== Personnel and kits ===
Team	Manager	Captain	Kit manufacturer	Main sponsor	Other sponsors
Al-Ahli	(Germany) Matthias Jaissle	(Brazil) Roberto Firmino	Adidas	Red Sea Global	List: Front: Saudi Investment Recycling Company, Neoleap; Back: Urpay, Kayanee, Cenomi; Sleeves: None; Shorts: Vveyon Water
Al-Ettifaq	(Saudi Arabia) Saad Al-Shehri	(Netherlands) Georginio Wijnaldum	Adidas	Kammelna	List: Front: Aldyar Alarabiya, Hongqi, Tameeni Insurance; Back: Procare Riaya Hospital, Innosoft, Enterprise Rent-A-Car; Sleeves: Saudi Qaid Transport Company, Direct KSA; Shorts: None
Al-Fateh	(Portugal) José Gomes	(Saudi Arabia) Mohammed Al-Fuhaid	100°	Theeb Rent A Car	List: Front: Riyad Bank, Fuchsia Bakery, Tameeni Insurance; Back: Tamweel Aloula; Sleeves: Ratio Speciality Coffee; Shorts: None
Al-Fayha	(Portugal) Pedro Emanuel	(Saudi Arabia) Sami Al-Khaibari	Skillano	Basic Electronics Company	List: Front: Tameeni Insurance; Back: Al Romaih Investment; Sleeves: Morabaha Marina Financing Company; Shorts: None
Al-Hilal	(Saudi Arabia) Mohammad Al-Shalhoub (caretaker)	(Saudi Arabia) Salem Al-Dawsari	Puma	Savvy Games Group	List: Front: Jahez, Flynas; Back: Riyad Bank, Saudi Entertainment Ventures; Sleeves: Tree Digital Insurance Agency, Sanabil Investments; Shorts: None
Al-Ittihad	(France) Laurent Blanc	(France) Karim Benzema	Nike	Roshn	List: Front: SURJ Sports Investment, Volkswagen, Flow Progressive Logistics; Back: Milaf Al Madinah Heritage, Jamjoom Pharma; Sleeves: None; Shorts: Yaqoot
Al-Khaleej	(Greece) Georgios Donis	(Portugal) Fábio Martins	Laser	Yelo Rent a Car	List: Front: Fisher Electronics, Tameeni Insurance, Almana Hospital; Back: Shemagh Al Bassam, Florina Shoes, Candy; Sleeves: Locate Food Delivery App, Saudi Qaid Transport Company; Shorts: Sayyar
Al-Kholood	(Algeria) Noureddine Zekri	(Brazil) Marcelo Grohe	Renown	Yelo Rent a Car	List: Front: Tameeni Insurance; Back: Mezaj Maghribhi, Florina Shoes, Elba Cookers; Sleeves: Saudi Qaid Transport Company; Shorts: None
Al-Nassr	(Italy) Stefano Pioli	(Portugal) Cristiano Ronaldo	Adidas	KAFD	List: Front: Nassr TV, AROYA Cruises, Gathern; Back: None; Sleeves: Noug, DAZN; Shorts: None
Al-Okhdood	(Portugal) Paulo Sérgio	(Saudi Arabia) Hussain Al-Zabdani	Skillano	Yelo Rent a Car	List: Front: Tameeni Insurance; Back: Mezaj Maghribhi; Sleeves: Saudi Qaid Transport Company; Shorts: None
Al-Orobah	(Spain) Antonio Cazorla	(Saudi Arabia) Hamed Al-Maghati	Hattrick	Arrow Modern Future	List: Front: Tameeni Insurance; Back: Al-Jouf Cement; Sleeves: None; Shorts: None
Al-Qadsiah	(Spain) Míchel	(Spain) Nacho	Nike	Aloula Aviation	List: Front: Almajdouie Genesis, Almana Hospital; Back: iz; Sleeves: Saudi Geophysical; Shorts: Batook Nova
Al-Raed	(Croatia) Krešimir Režić	(Morocco) Mohamed Fouzair	Challenge	Dinar Investment	List: Front: Tameeni Insurance; Back: Al Qassim National Hospital; Sleeves: Saudi Qaid Transport Company, Direct KSA; Shorts: None
Al-Riyadh	(Saudi Arabia) Bandar Al-Kubaishan	(Saudi Arabia) Abdullah Al-Khaibri	Al Tazaj	Science Technology	List: Front: Tameeni Insurance; Back: Stars Smile; Sleeves: None; Shorts: None
Al-Shabab	(Turkey) Fatih Terim	(Belgium) Yannick Carrasco	Offside	Theeb Rent A Car	List: Front: Tameeni Insurance; Back: None; Sleeves: None; Shorts: None
Al-Taawoun	(Saudi Arabia) Mohammed Al-Abdali (caretaker)	(Netherlands) Aschraf El Mahdioui	Macron	Aldyar Alarabiya	List: Front: Gree Electric, Dr Tooth Clinics; Back: Al Dahayan Aluminum Panel Factory, Al Saif Trading Agencies; Sleeves: Direct KSA, Duvet Mattresses; Shorts: None
Al-Wehda	(Uruguay) José Daniel Carreño	(Saudi Arabia) Waleed Bakshween	Albaik	Yelo Rent A Car	List: Front: Tameeni Insurance; Back: Ntam, Makkah Medical Center; Sleeves: Saudi Qaid Transport Company; Shorts: None
Damac	(Saudi Arabia) Khaled Al-Atwi	(Algeria) Farouk Chafaï	Skillano	Basic Electronics Company	List: Front: Osoul Poultry, Tameeni Insurance; Back: Tadawi Clinic; Sleeves: Saudi Qaid Transport Company, Lateen Water; Shorts: None

=== Managerial changes ===
Team	Outgoing manager	Manner of departure	Date of vacancy	Position in table	Incoming manager	Date of appointment
Al-Fayha	(Serbia) Vuk Rašović	End of contract	1 June 2024	Pre-season	(Greece) Christos Kontis	8 July 2024
Al-Kholood	(Portugal) Fabiano Flora	End of contract	1 June 2024	Pre-season	(Portugal) Paulo Duarte	21 June 2024
Al-Okhdood	(Algeria) Noureddine Zekri	End of contract	1 June 2024	Pre-season	(Croatia) Stjepan Tomas	22 July 2024
Al-Orobah	(Bosnia and Herzegovina) Rusmir Cviko	End of contract	1 June 2024	Pre-season	(Portugal) Álvaro Pacheco	21 July 2024
Al-Raed	(Croatia) Igor Jovićević	End of contract	1 June 2024	Pre-season	(Brazil) Odair Hellmann	14 July 2024
Al-Riyadh	(Brazil) Odair Hellmann	End of contract	1 June 2024	Pre-season	(France) Sabri Lamouchi	12 July 2024
Al-Taawoun	(Brazil) Péricles Chamusca	End of contract	1 June 2024	Pre-season	(Argentina) Rodolfo Arruabarrena	6 July 2024
Al-Wehda	(Greece) Georgios Donis	End of contract	1 June 2024	Pre-season	(Germany) Josef Zinnbauer	24 July 2024
Al-Khaleej	(Portugal) Pedro Emanuel	Resigned	23 June 2024	Pre-season	(Greece) Georgios Donis	11 July 2024
Al-Ittihad	(Argentina) Marcelo Gallardo	Sacked	2 July 2024	Pre-season	(France) Laurent Blanc	13 July 2024
Al-Fateh	(Croatia) Slaven Bilić	Mutual consent	16 August 2024	Pre-season	(Sweden) Jens Gustafsson	22 August 2024
Al-Nassr	(Portugal) Luís Castro	Sacked	17 September 2024	7th	(Italy) Stefano Pioli	18 September 2024
Al-Kholood	(Portugal) Paulo Duarte	Sacked	13 October 2024	16th	(Algeria) Noureddine Zekri	13 October 2024
Al-Wehda	(Germany) Josef Zinnbauer	Resigned	15 November 2024	17th	(Egypt) Mahmoud Abbas (caretaker)	15 November 2024
Al-Wehda	(Egypt) Mahmoud Abbas (caretaker)	End of caretaker period	27 November 2024	15th	(Uruguay) José Daniel Carreño	27 November 2024
Al-Fayha	(Greece) Christos Kontis	Mutual consent	3 December 2024	17th	(Greece) Alexandros Tziolis (caretaker)	3 December 2024
Al-Fateh	(Sweden) Jens Gustafsson	Mutual consent	4 December 2024	18th	(Germany) Guido Hoffmann (caretaker)	4 December 2024
Damac	(Romania) Cosmin Contra	Resigned	6 December 2024	10th	(Portugal) Nuno Almeida	25 December 2024
Al-Fayha	(Greece) Alexandros Tziolis (caretaker)	End of caretaker period	10 December 2024	17th	(Portugal) Pedro Emanuel	10 December 2024
Al-Fateh	(Germany) Guido Hoffmann (caretaker)	End of caretaker period	12 December 2024	18th	(Portugal) José Gomes	12 December 2024
Al-Shabab	(Portugal) Vítor Pereira	Signed by Wolverhampton Wanderers	19 December 2024	6th	(Turkey) Fatih Terim	27 December 2024
Al-Orobah	(Portugal) Álvaro Pacheco	Resigned	2 January 2025	13th	(Saudi Arabia) Mohammed Al-Sharari (caretaker)	2 January 2025
Al-Orobah	(Saudi Arabia) Mohammed Al-Sharari (caretaker)	End of caretaker period	12 January 2025	14th	(Iraq) Adnan Hamad	12 January 2025
Al-Ettifaq	(England) Steven Gerrard	Mutual consent	30 January 2025	11th	(Saudi Arabia) Saad Al-Shehri	30 January 2025
Al-Taawoun	(Argentina) Rodolfo Arruabarrena	Sacked	9 February 2025	10th	(Saudi Arabia) Mohammed Al-Abdali (caretaker)	9 February 2025
Al-Okhdood	(Croatia) Stjepan Tomas	Mutual consent	19 February 2025	15th	(Tunisia) Ridha Jeddi (caretaker)	19 February 2025
Al-Okhdood	(Tunisia) Ridha Jeddi	End of caretaker period	1 March 2025	17th	(Portugal) Paulo Sérgio	1 March 2025
Damac	(Portugal) Nuno Almeida	Sacked	27 March 2025	11th	(Saudi Arabia) Khaled Al-Atwi	27 March 2025
Al-Raed	(Brazil) Odair Hellmann	Sacked	1 April 2025	18th	(Croatia) Krešimir Režić	1 April 2025
Al-Riyadh	(France) Sabri Lamouchi	Sacked	19 April 2025	9th	(Saudi Arabia) Bandar Al-Kubaishan (caretaker)	19 April 2025
Al-Orobah	(Iraq) Adnan Hamad	Sacked	28 April 2025	16th	(Spain) Antonio Cazorla	1 May 2025
Al-Hilal	(Portugal) Jorge Jesus	Sacked	3 May 2025	2nd	(Saudi Arabia) Mohammad Al-Shalhoub (caretaker)	2 May 2025

== Foreign players ==
On 29 December 2023, the Saudi Arabian Football Federation increased the amount of foreign players a club could register to ten, with eight players of any age and two players required to be aged 21 or younger. For league matches, clubs could only designate eight players as available for every match throughout the season but could designate ten as available for the King's Cup and Super Cup.

- Player names in **bold** indicate the player was registered during the mid-season transfer window.
- Player names in italics were out of the squad or left the club within the season, after the pre-season transfer window, or in the mid-season transfer window, and at least had one appearance.
- Players from other countries who were born in Saudi Arabia are counted as homegrown/local players.

Club	Player 1	Player 2	Player 3	Player 4	Player 5	Player 6	Player 7	Player 8	U21 Player 1	U21 Player 2	U19 player (s)	Unregistered players	Former players
Al-Ahli	(Algeria) Riyad Mahrez	(Brazil) **Galeno**	(Brazil) Roger Ibañez	(England) Ivan Toney	(Ivory Coast) Franck Kessié	(Senegal) Édouard Mendy	(Spain) Gabri Veiga	(Turkey) Merih Demiral	(Belgium) **Matteo Dams**	(Brazil) Alexsander		(Brazil) Roberto Firmino (North Macedonia) Ezgjan Alioski	
Al-Ettifaq	(Brazil) Vitinho	(Cameroon) Karl Toko Ekambi	(France) Moussa Dembélé	(Jamaica) Demarai Gray	(Netherlands) Georginio Wijnaldum	(Scotland) Jack Hendry	(Slovakia) Marek Rodák	(Spain) Álvaro Medrán	(Colombia) **Josen Escobar**	(Portugal) João Costa	(Tunisia) Wissam Chaouali		
Al-Fateh	(Algeria) Sofiane Bendebka	(Argentina) **Matías Vargas**	(Cape Verde) Djaniny	(Comoros) **Zaydou Youssouf**	(Morocco) Amine Sbaï	(Morocco) Marwane Saâdane	(Morocco) Mourad Batna	(Portugal) **Jorge Fernandes**	(Brazil) **Matheus Machado**				(Armenia) Lucas Zelarayán (Belgium) Jason Denayer (Hungary) Péter Szappanos
Al-Fayha	(Bosnia and Herzegovina) Gojko Cimirot	(England) Chris Smalling	(Nigeria) Henry Onyekuru	(Panama) Orlando Mosquera	(Spain) Alejandro Pozuelo	(Uruguay) Renzo López	(Uzbekistan) Otabek Shukurov	(Zambia) Fashion Sakala	(Brazil) **Gabriel Vareta**	(Brazil) Vinícius Rangel			(Venezuela) Aldry Contreras
Al-Hilal	(Brazil) Malcom	(Brazil) Renan Lodi	(Morocco) Yassine Bounou	(Portugal) João Cancelo	(Portugal) Rúben Neves	(Senegal) Kalidou Koulibaly	(Serbia) Aleksandar Mitrović	(Serbia) Sergej Milinković-Savić	(Brazil) **Kaio César**	(Brazil) Marcos Leonardo			(Brazil) Neymar
Al-Ittihad	(Algeria) Houssem Aouar	(Brazil) Fabinho	(France) Karim Benzema	(France) Moussa Diaby	(France) N'Golo Kanté	(Netherlands) Steven Bergwijn	(Portugal) Danilo Pereira	(Serbia) Predrag Rajković	(Albania) Mario Mitaj	(Spain) **Unai Hernández**	(Argentina) Mateo Borrell		(Italy) Luiz Felipe
Al-Khaleej	(Austria) **Thomas Murg**	(Bosnia and Herzegovina) Ibrahim Šehić	(Democratic Republic of the Congo) Marcel Tisserand	(Egypt) Mohamed Sherif	(Greece) Dimitrios Kourbelis	(Greece) Kostas Fortounis	(Portugal) Fábio Martins	(Portugal) Pedro Rebocho			(The Gambia) **Babucarr Seye**		(Togo) Khaled Narey
Al-Kholood	(Brazil) Marcelo Grohe	(Comoros) Myziane Maolida	(Democratic Republic of the Congo) Jackson Muleka	(France) Kevin N'Doram	(Mali) Aliou Dieng	(Nigeria) William Troost-Ekong	(Slovakia) Norbert Gyömbér	(Spain) Álex Collado	(The Gambia) **Kebba Sowe**	(Nigeria) **Ambrose Ochigbo**			
Al-Nassr	(Brazil) Bento	(Colombia) **Jhon Durán**	(Croatia) Marcelo Brozović	(France) Mohamed Simakan	(Portugal) Cristiano Ronaldo	(Portugal) Otávio	(Senegal) Sadio Mané	(Spain) Aymeric Laporte	(Brazil) Ângelo Gabriel	(Brazil) Wesley			(Brazil) Talisca
Al-Okhdood	(Brazil) Paulo Vítor	(Brazil) Petros	(Cameroon) Christian Bassogog	(Colombia) Sebastián Pedroza	(Guinea) **Ousmane Barry**	(Jamaica) Damion Lowe	(Nigeria) Saviour Godwin	(Zimbabwe) Knowledge Musona	(Brazil) Diego Ferreira	(Egypt) Karim Ashraf		(Mali) Ibrahima Koné	
Al-Orobah	(Belgium) Gaëtan Coucke	(Croatia) Karlo Muhar	(France) Kurt Zouma	(Iceland) Jóhann Berg Guðmundsson	(Ivory Coast) Jean Michaël Seri	(Morocco) Ismaël Kandouss	(Spain) Cristian Tello	(Syria) **Omar Al Somah**	(England) Brad Young	(Jordan) **Mohannad Abu Taha**	(Yemen) Abdulaziz Masnoum		(Ghana) Emmanuel Boateng
Al-Qadsiah	(Argentina) Ezequiel Fernández	(Belgium) Koen Casteels	(Gabon) Pierre-Emerick Aubameyang	(Mexico) Julián Quiñones	(Spain) Nacho	(Switzerland) Cameron Puertas	(Uruguay) Gastón Álvarez	(Uruguay) Nahitan Nández	(Spain) Iker Almena		(Brazil) Guga (Spain) Alejandro Vergaz		
Al-Raed	(Algeria) Amir Sayoud	(Algeria) Mehdi Abeid	(Algeria) **Yousri Bouzok**	(Cameroon) Oumar Gonzalez	(Morocco) Ayoub Qasmi	(Morocco) Karim El Berkaoui	(Norway) Mathias Normann	(Portugal) André Moreira	(Liberia) **Salomon Tweh**	(Sierra Leone) **Moses Turay**	(Egypt) Abdelrahman Sherif	(Morocco) Mohamed Fouzair	
Al-Riyadh	(Brazil) Lucas Kal	(Burkina Faso) Mohamed Konaté	(Canada) Milan Borjan	(Comoros) Faïz Selemani	(France) Yoann Barbet	(Ghana) Bernard Mensah	(Iraq) Ibrahim Bayesh	(Portugal) Tozé	(France) **Sekou Lega**	(Scotland) Vincent Angelini	(Romania) **Enes Sali**	(Chile) Enzo Roco	
Al-Shabab	(Argentina) Cristian Guanca	(Belgium) Yannick Carrasco	(Finland) **Glen Kamara**	(Italy) Giacomo Bonaventura	(Morocco) Abderrazak Hamdallah	(Netherlands) Wesley Hoedt	(Portugal) Daniel Podence	(Ukraine) **Heorhiy Bushchan**	(Brazil) **Leandrinho**	(Brazil) Robert Renan		(South Korea) Kim Seung-gyu	(Colombia) Gustavo Cuéllar
Al-Taawoun	(Brazil) Andrei Girotto	(Brazil) Flávio Medeiros	(Brazil) Mailson	(Colombia) **Roger Martínez**	(The Gambia) Musa Barrow	(Morocco) **Abdelhamid Sabiri**	(Morocco) Fayçal Fajr	(Netherlands) Aschraf El Mahdioui	(Bolivia) Lucas Chávez	(Venezuela) Renne Rivas			(Brazil) João Pedro (Brazil) Mateus Castro
Al-Wehda	(Australia) Craig Goodwin	(Curaçao) Juninho Bacuna	(Morocco) Jawad El Yamiq	(Morocco) Mohamed Al Makahasi	(Nigeria) Odion Ighalo	(Romania) Alexandru Crețu	(Tunisia) Saad Bguir		(Iraq) Youssef Amyn				(Netherlands) Vito van Crooij (Uruguay) Ignacio de Arruabarrena
Damac	(Algeria) Abdelkader Bedrane	(Algeria) Farouk Chafaï	(Cameroon) Georges-Kévin Nkoudou	(Egypt) Tarek Hamed	(Guinea) François Kamano	(Romania) Florin Niță	(Romania) Nicolae Stanciu	(Senegal) Habib Diallo				(The Gambia) Assan Ceesay (Netherlands) Adam Maher	

== League table ==
Pos	Team	Pld	W	D	L	GF	GA	GD	Pts	Qualification or relegation
1	Al-Ittihad (C)	34	26	5	3	79	35	+44	83	Qualification for AFC Champions League Elite League stage
2	Al-Hilal	34	23	6	5	95	41	+54	75	Qualification for AFC Champions League Elite League stage
3	Al-Nassr	34	21	7	6	80	38	+42	70	Qualification for AFC Champions League Two group stage (Note: Since the winners of the 2024–25 King's Cup, Al-Ittihad, had already qualified for the Champions League Elite, the spot given to the King's Cup winners (Champions League Two) was passed to the third-placed team.)
4	Al-Qadsiah	34	21	5	8	53	31	+22	68	
5	Al-Ahli	34	21	4	9	69	36	+33	67	Qualification for AFC Champions League Elite League stage (Note: By virtue of winning 2024–25 AFC Champions League Elite.)
6	Al-Shabab	34	18	6	10	65	41	+24	60	Qualification for the AGCFF Gulf Club Champions League group stage (Note: Al-Qadsiah withdrew from AGCFF Gulf Club Champions League, the spot was passed to the next highest-placed team who did not qualified to the Asian club competitions.)
7	Al-Ettifaq	34	14	8	12	44	45	−1	50	
8	Al-Taawoun	34	12	9	13	40	39	+1	45	
9	Al-Kholood	34	12	4	18	42	64	−22	40	
10	Al-Fateh	34	11	6	17	47	61	−14	39	
11	Al-Riyadh	34	10	8	16	37	52	−15	38	
12	Al-Khaleej	34	10	7	17	40	57	−17	37	
13	Al-Fayha	34	8	12	14	27	49	−22	36	
14	Damac	34	9	8	17	37	50	−13	35	
15	Al-Okhdood	34	9	7	18	33	56	−23	34	
16	Al-Wehda (R)	34	9	6	19	42	67	−25	33	Relegation to First Division League
17	Al-Orobah (R)	34	9	3	22	31	74	−43	30	Relegation to First Division League
18	Al-Raed (R)	34	6	3	25	41	66	−25	21	Relegation to First Division League

Source: SPL
Rules for classification: 1) Points; 2) Head-to-head points; 3) Head-to-head goal difference; 4) Total goal difference; 5) Total goals scored; 6) Fair-play points
(Note: Head-to-head record is used only after all the matches between the teams in question have been played).
(C) Champions; (R) Relegated

=== Positions by round ===
The following table lists the positions of teams after each week of matches. In order to preserve the chronological evolution, any postponed matches are not included in the round at which they were originally scheduled but added to the full round they were played immediately afterward.

Team ╲ Round	1	2	3	4	5	6	7	8	9	10	11	12	13	14	15	16	17	18	19	20	21	22	23	24	25	26	27	28	29	30	31	32	33	34	35	36	37	38	39	40	41	42	43	44	45	46	47	48	49
Al-Ahli	3	8	9	6	7	10	7	8	9	8	7	6	5	5	5	5	5	5	5	5	5		10	11	12	12	13	11	11	11	11	12	11	9	10	9	7	7	7	7	8	8	7	8	7	7	7	7	7
Al-Fateh	18	12	14	16	18	18	18	18	18	18	18	18	18	18	18	18	18	18	18	18	17	15	15	15	15	16	14	13	13	11	13	14	12	10															
Al-Fayha	12	17	18	18	15	14	16	16	16	16	17	17	17	17	16	14	14	13	14	14	13	14	14	14	14	13	12	14	14	12	14	11	13	13															
Al-Hilal	1	1	2	1	1	1	1	1	1	1	2	2	2	1	1	1	1	1	2	2	2	2	2	2	2	2	2	2	2	2	2	2	2	2															
Al-Ittihad	5	3	1	2	2	2	2	2	2	2	1	1	1	2	2	2	2	2	1	1	1	1	1	1	1	1	1	1	1	1	1	1	1	1															
Al-Khaleej	6	10	13	13	14	12	13	11	7	6	6	7	8	9	7	8	8	8	8	9	10	9	10	11	11	10	10	10	10	10	11	10	9	12															
Al-Kholood	13	15	15	11	12	16	15	14	15	15	16	14	15	13	12	12	11	12	12	12	11	11	11	10	10	11	11	12	12	14	12	13	10	9															
Al-Nassr	10	5	7	5	4	3	3	3	3	3	3	3	4	3	4	4	4	3	3	3	4	3	4	4	3	3	3	3	3	4	3	4	3	3															
Al-Okhdood	17	18	17	17	13	17	17	17	13	14	14	14	14	15	15	13	13	14	15	15	16	17	17	17	16	15	16	17	15	17	17	17	16	15															
Al-Orobah	16	16	16	12	9	11	10	12	12	13	13	12	13	14	14	16	16	16	13	15	14	13	12	12	13	14	15	15	16	15	16	16	17	17															
Al-Qadsiah	2	2	4	7	5	6	8	5	5	5	5	4	3	4	3	3	3	4	4	4	3	4	3	3	4	4	5	5	5	5	4	3	4	4															
Al-Raed	11	13	8	10	11	9	11	7	10	11	10	10	12	12	13	15	15	15	16	16	15	16	16	16	18	18	18	18	18	18	18	18	18	18															
Al-Riyadh	8	6	10	8	10	7	4	6	6	9	9	9	7	7	9	7	8	7	7	7	7	8	9	9	9	9	9	9	9	9	9	9	11	12															
Al-Shabab	14	11	6	3	3	4	5	4	4	4	4	5	6	6	6	6	6	6	6	6	6	6	6	6	6	6	6	6	6	6	6	6	6	6															
Al-Taawoun	7	9	5	9	8	5	6	9	8	7	8	8	9	8	8	9	9	9	10	8	8	10	8	8	8	7	7	8	7	8	8	8	8	8															
Al-Wehda	9	7	11	14	16	15	14	15	17	17	15	16	16	16	17	17	17	17	17	17	18	18	18	18	18	17	17	16	17	16	15	15	15	16															
Damac	15	14	12	15	17	13	12	13	14	10	11	11	10	10	10	10	10	10	11	11	12	12	13	13	12	12	13	11	11	13	10	12	14	14															

Leader and AFC Champions League Elite league stage
AFC Champions League Elite league stage
AFC Champions League Two group stage
Qualification for the AGCFF Gulf Club Champions League group stage
Relegation to FD League

== Results ==
Home \ Away	AHL	ETT	FAT	FAY	HIL	ITT	KHJ	KHO	NSR	OKH	ORO	QAD	RAE	RIY	SHB	TWN	WHD	DAM
Al-Ahli		1–3	2–0	5–0	1–2	2–2	2–2	4–1	2–3	1–1	2–0	4–1	2–0	5–0	3–2	2–0	1–0	4–2
Al-Ettifaq	1–2		1–2	0–2	1–1	0–4	2–1	2–3	0–3	1–0	2–3	0–2	0–1	1–0	3–1	1–0	2–1	0–0
Al-Fateh	1–0	1–2		1–1	3–4	2–0	1–2	1–1	3–2	2–4	1–0	1–1	3–1	1–2	3–1	1–2	1–2	2–1
Al-Fayha	0–1	1–1	1–1		0–2	1–1	0–0	1–0	1–4	2–0	0–1	2–1	0–5	2–0	0–2	0–0	0–0	2–1
Al-Hilal	2–3	3–1	9–0	3–0		3–1	3–0	5–1	1–3	4–0	4–0	2–0	3–2	1–1	2–2	2–0	4–1	3–2
Al-Ittihad	1–0	3–2	2–0	3–0	4–1		4–1	4–3	2–1	1–1	2–0	3–1	4–1	2–1	2–1	2–1	7–1	1–0
Al-Khaleej	0–3	1–2	1–5	0–0	3–2	1–1		1–0	1–3	2–3	3–0	1–1	4–0	1–2	0–1	0–1	0–2	1–1
Al-Kholood	1–0	1–0	2–1	2–0	2–4	0–1	2–1		3–3	0–1	3–3	0–3	2–1	3–2	0–2	0–2	1–0	1–3
Al-Nassr	1–1	2–3	3–1	3–0	1–1	2–3	2–0	3–1		3–1	3–0	1–2	1–1	2–1	2–2	1–1	2–0	2–0
Al-Okhdood	2–1	0–2	1–3	1–2	0–3	1–2	1–2	1–2	0–9		4–0	0–0	1–0	0–1	1–1	1–1	1–2	0–0
Al-Orobah	0–2	1–2	1–0	2–2	0–5	0–2	1–2	2–0	0–3 (Note: Al-Orobah initially won the match 2–1, but Al-Nassr contested the eligibility of goalkeeper Rafi Al-Ruwaili, claiming he was a government employee. As a result, the result was voided and Al-Nassr were awarded a 3–0 win.)	0–1		0–2	0–4	0–1	0–3	3–2	4–2	1–0
Al-Qadsiah	1–0	1–1	3–0	2–0	2–1	1–1	1–0	4–1	2–1	2–0	3–1		2–0	1–0	0–1	0–3	3–1	2–1
Al-Raed	0–2	1–1	2–1	0–2	3–5	1–3	1–2	1–2	1–2	0–2	3–1	0–1		1–2	1–2	0–1	2–2	0–2
Al-Riyadh	0–1	0–0	2–2	0–0	0–3	0–1	2–2	3–1	0–1	1–0	2–4	2–1	1–3		1–3	1–0	1–0	0–0
Al-Shabab	3–1	0–1	2–2	2–1	1–2	2–3	5–1	2–0	1–2	0–0	6–0	2–3	2–1	2–1		1–0	3–1	2–0
Al-Taawoun	2–4	1–1	2–0	1–0	0–2	1–2	2–0	1–1	1–1	1–0	0–0	0–1	4–3	3–2	2–2		0–2	3–0
Al-Wehda	2–3	2–2	1–0	2–2	1–1	1–4	1–3	0–1	0–2	2–3	2–1	0–3	3–1	3–3	1–3	1–0		2–3
Damac	0–2	0–3	0–1	2–2	2–2	2–1	0–1	2–1	2–3	3–1	1–2	1–0	1–0	2–2	1–0	2–2	0–1	

Source: Saudi Pro League
Legend: Blue = home team win; Yellow = draw; Red = away team win.
For upcoming matches, an "a" indicates there is an article about the rivalry between the two participants.

== Season statistics ==
=== Top scorers ===
Rank	Player	Club	Goals
1	(Portugal) Cristiano Ronaldo	Al-Nassr	25
2	(England) Ivan Toney	Al-Ahli	23
3	(France) Karim Benzema	Al-Ittihad	21
3	(Morocco) Abderrazak Hamdallah	Al-Shabab	21
5	(Mexico) Julián Quiñones	Al-Qadsiah	20
6	(Serbia) Aleksandar Mitrović	Al-Hilal	19
7	(Gabon) Pierre-Emerick Aubameyang	Al-Qadsiah	17
7	(Brazil) Marcos Leonardo	Al-Hilal	17
9	(Saudi Arabia) Salem Al-Dawsari	Al-Hilal	15
9	(Comoros) Myziane Maolida	Al-Kholood	15

==== Hat-tricks ====
Player	For	Against	Result	Date	Ref.
(France) Karim Benzema	Al-Ittihad	Al-Wehda	7–1 (H)	15 September 2024	
(Brazil) Marcos Leonardo	Al-Hilal	Al-Fateh	9–0 (H)	16 January 2025	
(Morocco) Abderrazak Hamdallah	Al-Shabab	Al-Khaleej	5–1 (H)	6 February 2025	
(England) Ivan Toney	Al-Ahli	Al-Hilal	3–2 (A)	28 February 2025	
(Morocco) Abderrazak Hamdallah	Al-Shabab	Al-Orobah	6–0 (H)	13 March 2025	
(Syria) Omar Al Somah	Al-Orobah	Al-Riyadh	4–2 (A)	1 May 2025	
(Saudi Arabia) Salem Al-Dawsari	Al-Hilal	Al-Raed	5–3 (A)	8 May 2025	
(Senegal) Sadio Mané^{4}	Al-Nassr	Al-Okhdood	9–0 (A)	12 May 2025	

Note

(H) – Home; (A) – Away
^{4} Player scored 4 goals

=== Most assists ===
Rank	Player	Club	Assists
1	(Saudi Arabia) Salem Al-Dawsari	Al-Hilal	15
2	(France) Moussa Diaby	Al-Ittihad	14
3	(Argentina) Cristian Guanca	Al-Shabab	11
3	(Senegal) Sadio Mané	Al-Nassr	11
5	(Algeria) Riyad Mahrez	Al-Ahli	10
5	(Saudi Arabia) Musab Al-Juwayr	Al-Hilal/Al-Shabab	10
5	(Brazil) Malcom	Al-Hilal	10
8	(France) Karim Benzema	Al-Ittihad	9
8	(Switzerland) Cameron Puertas	Al-Qadsiah	9
10	(Portugal) Rúben Neves	Al-Hilal	8

=== Clean sheets ===
Rank	Player	Club	Clean sheets
1	(Belgium) Koen Casteels	Al-Qadsiah	14
2	(Senegal) Édouard Mendy	Al-Ahli	12
3	(Panama) Orlando Mosquera	Al-Fayha	10
4	(Morocco) Yassine Bounou	Al-Hilal	9
4	(Brazil) Bento	Al-Nassr	9
6	(Canada) Milan Borjan	Al-Riyadh	8
6	(Slovakia) Marek Rodák	Al-Ettifaq	8
8	(Brazil) Mailson	Al-Taawoun	7
8	(Serbia) Predrag Rajković	Al-Ittihad	7
8	(Romania) Florin Niță	Damac	7
8	(Brazil) Paulo Vítor	Al-Okhdood	7

=== Discipline ===
==== Player ====
- Most yellow cards: 12
  - (Saudi Arabia) Dhari Al-Anazi (Damac)
  - (Croatia) Marcelo Brozović (Al-Nassr)
  - (Uruguay) Nahitan Nández (Al-Qadsiah)
- Most red cards: 2
  - (Saudi Arabia) Awn Al-Saluli (Al-Taawoun)
  - (Saudi Arabia) Ahmed Assiri (Al-Riyadh)
  - (Algeria) Abdelkader Bedrane (Damac)
  - (Cameroon) Oumar Gonzalez (Al-Raed)
  - (Saudi Arabia) Abdullah Radif (Al-Ettifaq)
  - (France) Mohamed Simakan (Al-Nassr)

==== Club ====
- Most yellow cards: 83
  - Al-Ahli
- Most red cards: 8
  - Al-Taawoun

== Attendances ==
=== By round ===
2024–25 Professional League Attendance
Round	Total	GP.	Avg. Per Game
Round 1	50,658	9	5,629
Round 2	54,873	9	6,097
Round 3	105,197	9	11,689
Round 4	64,027	9	7,114
Round 5	79,750	9	8,861
Round 6	83,339	9	9,260
Round 7	81,278	9	9,031
Round 8	54,384	9	6,043
Round 9	101,412	9	11,268
Round 10	66,793	9	7,421
Round 11	54,733	9	6,081
Round 12	74,852	9	8,317
Round 13	89,730	9	9,970
Round 14	60,069	9	6,674
Round 15	64,452	9	7,161
Round 16	88,763	9	9,863
Round 17	66,398	9	7,378
Round 18	69,976	9	7,775
Round 19	71,153	9	7,906
Round 20	103,248	9	11,472
Round 21	114,150	9	12,683
Round 22	81,615	9	9,068
Round 23	90,958	9	10,106
Round 24	59,387	9	6,599
Round 25	70,515	9	7,835
Round 26	89,080	9	9,898
Round 27	84,221	9	9,358
Round 28	64,016	9	7,113
Round 29	79,274	9	8,808
Round 30	77,774	9	8,642
Round 31	50,167	9	5,574
Round 32	57,441	9	6,382
Round 33	55,745	9	6,194
Round 34	97,144	9	10,794
Total	2,556,572	306	8,355

=== By team ===
Pos	Team	Total	High	Low	Average	Change
1	Al-Ittihad	594,326	58,117	13,823	34,960	+5.6%
2	Al-Ahli	354,019	53,036	5,193	20,825	−14.5%
3	Al-Hilal	302,028	25,187	8,989	17,766	−18.6%
4	Al-Nassr	276,972	25,490	5,889	16,292	−8.6%
5	Al-Qadsiah	168,406	20,115	3,296	9,906	n/a^{†}
6	Al-Fateh	130,632	11,278	3,097	7,684	−6.7%
7	Al-Ettifaq	97,930	11,008	2,349	5,761	−21.2%
8	Al-Shabab	89,139	11,557	2,377	5,243	−20.1%
9	Al-Taawoun	87,524	16,478	1,518	5,149	−24.5%
10	Damac	85,366	15,066	632	5,022	+15.9%
11	Al-Khaleej	78,589	17,150	1,073	4,623	−13.7%
12	Al-Raed	63,941	18,796	471	3,761	−40.7%
13	Al-Wehda	56,376	16,275	247	3,316	+25.9%
14	Al-Kholood	46,677	9,937	687	2,746	n/a^{†}
15	Al-Orobah	39,211	8,300	85	2,307	n/a^{†}
16	Al-Riyadh	33,111	8,914	89	1,948	+4.7%
17	Al-Okhdood	27,794	5,099	431	1,635	−27.1%
18	Al-Fayha	24,531	4,195	390	1,443	−37.3%
	League total	2,556,572	58,117	85	8,355	+2.4%

Source: Announced at the end of every match at the stadiums
Notes:
^{†} Teams played previous season in FD League.

== Awards ==
=== Monthly awards ===
Month	Manager of the Month		Player of the Month		Goalkeeper of the Month		Rising Star of the Month		Reference
Month	Manager	Club	Player	Club	Player	Club	Player	Club	Reference
September	(Portugal) Jorge Jesus	Al-Hilal	(Serbia) Aleksandar Mitrović	Al-Hilal	(Belgium) Koen Casteels	Al-Qadsiah	(Saudi Arabia) Musab Al-Juwayr	Al-Shabab	
October	(France) Laurent Blanc	Al-Ittihad	(France) Moussa Diaby	Al-Ittihad	(Serbia) Predrag Rajković	Al-Ittihad	(Saudi Arabia) Musab Al-Juwayr	Al-Shabab	
November	(France) Laurent Blanc	Al-Ittihad	(Serbia) Sergej Milinković-Savić	Al-Hilal	(Belgium) Koen Casteels	Al-Qadsiah	(Saudi Arabia) Musab Al-Juwayr	Al-Shabab	
January	(Italy) Stefano Pioli	Al-Nassr	(Brazil) Marcos Leonardo	Al-Hilal	(Morocco) Yassine Bounou	Al-Hilal	(Saudi Arabia) Musab Al-Juwayr	Al-Shabab	
February	(France) Laurent Blanc	Al-Ittihad	(Argentina) Cristian Guanca	Al-Shabab	(Panama) Orlando Mosquera	Al-Fayha	(Saudi Arabia) Musab Al-Juwayr	Al-Shabab	
March	(Turkey) Fatih Terim	Al-Shabab	(Argentina) Cristian Guanca	Al-Shabab	(Panama) Orlando Mosquera	Al-Fayha	(Saudi Arabia) Musab Al-Juwayr	Al-Shabab	
April	(Germany) Matthias Jaissle	Al-Ahli	(Brazil) Roger Ibañez	Al-Ahli	(Senegal) Édouard Mendy	Al-Ahli	(Saudi Arabia) Musab Al-Juwayr	Al-Shabab	

=== Weekly awards ===
Week (MD)	BSF Goal of the Week		Ref.
Week (MD)	Player	Club	Ref.
1	(Serbia) Sergej Milinković-Savić	Al-Hilal	
2	(France) Karim Benzema	Al-Ittihad	
3	(France) Karim Benzema	Al-Ittihad	
4	(Saudi Arabia) Salem Al-Dawsari	Al-Hilal	
5	(Saudi Arabia) Hamed Al-Ghamdi	Al-Ittihad	
6	(Senegal) Sadio Mané	Al-Nassr	
7	(Iceland) Jóhann Berg Guðmundsson	Al-Orobah	
8	(Algeria) Riyad Mahrez	Al-Ahli	
9	(Argentina) Cristian Guanca	Al-Shabab	
10	(Saudi Arabia) Turki Al-Ammar	Al-Qadsiah	
11	(Gabon) Pierre-Emerick Aubameyang	Al-Qadsiah	
12	(Serbia) Sergej Milinković-Savić	Al-Hilal	
13	(The Gambia) Musa Barrow	Al-Taawoun	
14	(Zambia) Fashion Sakala	Al-Fayha	
15	(Portugal) Daniel Podence	Al-Shabab	
16	(Spain) Alejandro Pozuelo	Al-Fayha	
17	(Algeria) Riyad Mahrez	Al-Ahli	
18	(Serbia) Sergej Milinković-Savić	Al-Hilal	
19	(Netherlands) Georginio Wijnaldum	Al-Ettifaq	
20	(Colombia) Jhon Durán	Al-Nassr	
21	(France) Karim Benzema	Al-Ittihad	
22	(Portugal) Cristiano Ronaldo	Al-Nassr	
23	(Argentina) Cristian Guanca	Al-Shabab	
24	(Portugal) Cristiano Ronaldo	Al-Nassr	
25	(Iraq) Ibrahim Bayesh	Al-Riyadh	
26	(Saudi Arabia) Ali Al-Hassan	Al-Nassr	
27	(Portugal) Cristiano Ronaldo	Al-Nassr	
28	(Algeria) Riyad Mahrez	Al-Ahli	
29	(Saudi Arabia) Ali Al-Hassan	Al-Nassr	
30	(Saudi Arabia) Salem Al-Dawsari	Al-Hilal	
31	(Croatia) Marcelo Brozović	Al-Nassr	
32	(Switzerland) Cameron Puertas	Al-Qadsiah	
33	(France) Moussa Diaby	Al-Ittihad	
34	(Morocco) Mourad Batna	Al-Fateh	

=== Annual awards ===
Award	Winner	Club	Ref.
Player of the Season	(France) Karim Benzema	Al-Ittihad	
Saudi Player of the Season	(Saudi Arabia) Salem Al-Dawsari	Al-Hilal	
Young Player of the Season	(Saudi Arabia) Musab Al-Juwayr	Al-Shabab	
Golden Boot	(Portugal) Cristiano Ronaldo	Al-Nassr	
Golden Glove	(Belgium) Koen Casteels	Al-Qadsiah	
Manager of the Season	(France) Laurent Blanc	Al-Ittihad	
Goal of the Season	(Portugal) Cristiano Ronaldo	Al-Nassr	

=== Team of the Season ===
Team of the Season
Goalkeeper	(Belgium) Koen Casteels (Al-Qadsiah)			
Defenders	(Brazil) Renan Lodi (Al-Hilal)		(Brazil) Roger Ibañez (Al-Ahli)	(Saudi Arabia) Mohammed Abu Al-Shamat (Al-Qadsiah)
Midfielders	(Saudi Arabia) Salem Al-Dawsari (Al-Hilal)	(Argentina) Cristian Guanca (Al-Shabab)	(Algeria) Riyad Mahrez (Al-Ahli)	(Brazil) Malcom (Al-Hilal)
Forwards	(France) Karim Benzema (Al-Ittihad)		(Portugal) Cristiano Ronaldo (Al-Nassr)	(England) Ivan Toney (Al-Ahli)

== See also ==
- 2024–25 Saudi First Division League
- 2024–25 Saudi Second Division League
- 2024–25 Saudi Third Division
- 2024–25 King's Cup
