= Saleh Al Abbas =

Saudi Arabian footballer (born 1995)

Personal information
- Full name: Saleh Yahya Asker Al Abbas
- Date of birth: December 6, 1993 (age 32)
- Place of birth: Najran, Saudi Arabia
- Height: 1.74 m (5 ft 9 in)
- Position: Striker

Team information
- Current team: Al-Okhdood
- Number: 14

Senior career*
Years	Team	Apps	(Gls)
2017–2019	Najran	63	(35)
2019–2021	Al-Nassr	0	(0)
2019–2020	→ Abha (loan)	23	(4)
2020–2021	→ Al-Batin (loan)	15	(4)
2021–2023	Al-Faisaly	9	(0)
2022–2023	→ Al-Khaleej (loan)	24	(0)
2023–2024	Al-Riyadh	27	(8)
2024–	Al-Okhdood	38	(4)
- * Club domestic league appearances and goals as of 28 February 2026 ‡ National team caps and goals as of 21:22, 26 December 2016 (UTC)

Saleh Al Abbas (Arabic: صالح آل عباس; born April 15, 1995) is a Saudi Arabian professional footballer who plays as a striker for Al-Okhdood.

== Career ==
On 5 August 2017, Saleh Al Abbas joined Najran. In his first season at the club, Al Abbas scored 18 goals in 28 appearances and finished three goals behind the top scorer, Mashari Al-Enezi. He also scored the second goal in the 2–1 defeat of Al-Muzahimiyyah in the relegation play-offs. In his second season, Al Abbas scored 17 goals in 35 appearances as Najran finished in 7th place. He made 68 appearances and scored 36 goals for Najran in his two seasons at the club.

On 24 May 2019, Saleh Al Abbas signed a three-year contract with Pro League champions Al-Nassr. He made his debut on 26 August 2019 in the first leg of the AFC Champions League quarter-finals against Qatari champions Al-Sadd. On 23 August 2019, Al Abbas joined newly promoted Pro League side Abha on a season-long loan. On 7 October 2020, Al Abbas joined newly promoted Pro League side Al-Batin on a season-long loan.

On 31 August 2021, Al Abbas joined Al-Faisaly on a three-year contract. On 25 July 2022, Al Abbas joined newly promoted Pro League side Al-Khaleej on loan.

On 7 August 2023, Al Abbas joined Al-Riyadh.

On 12 August 2024, Al Abbas joined Al-Okhdood on a two-year contract.

== Career statistics ==
As of 27 May 2024

Appearances and goals by club, season and competition
Club	Season	League			National Cup		Asia		Other		Total	
Club	Season	Division	Apps	Goals	Apps	Goals	Apps	Goals	Apps	Goals	Apps	Goals
Najran	2017–18	MS League	28	18	1	0	—		3 (Note: Appearances in relegation play-offs)	1	32	19
Najran	2018–19	MS League	35	17	1	0	—		—		36	17
Najran	Najran Total		63	35	2	0	0	0	3	1	68	36
Al-Nassr	2019–20	SPL	0	0	0	0	1	0	0	0	1	0
Abha (loan)	2019–20	SPL	23	4	3	1	—		—		26	5
Al-Batin (loan)	2020–21	SPL	15	4	1	0	—		—		16	4
Al-Faisaly	2021–22	SPL	9	0	0	0	1	0	0	0	10	0
Al-Khaleej (loan)	2022–23	SPL	24	0	1	0	—		—		25	0
Al-Riyadh	2023–24	SPL	27	8	1	0	—		—		28	8
Career total			161	51	8	1	2	0	3	1	174	53
