= Lucas Kal =

Brazilian footballer

Personal information
- Full name: Lucas Kal Schenfeld Prigioli
- Date of birth: 16 March 1996 (age 30)
- Place of birth: Campinas, Brazil
- Height: 1.86 m (6 ft 1 in)
- Position: Defensive midfielder

Team information
- Current team: Nantong Zhiyun

Youth career
- 2011−2017: Guarani

Senior career*
Years	Team	Apps	(Gls)
2017−2021	São Paulo	1	(0)
2017	→ Paraná (loan)	0	(0)
2018	→ Guarani (loan)	11	(0)
2018−2019	→ Vasco da Gama (loan)	1	(0)
2019−2020	→ América Mineiro (loan)	25	(1)
2020−2021	→ Nacional (loan)	24	(0)
2021	→ América Mineiro (loan)	20	(1)
2022−2024	América Mineiro	59	(0)
2024	Atlético Goianiense	22	(0)
2024−2025	Al-Riyadh	30	(3)
2025	Sport Recife	13	(0)
2026−	Nantong Zhiyun	29	(3)
- * Club domestic league appearances and goals as of 7 November 2026

Lucas Kal Schenfeld Prigioli (born 16 March 1996), known as Lucas Kal, is a Brazilian professional footballer who plays for Nantong Zhiyun. Mainly a defensive midfielder, he can also play as a central defender.

== Honours ==
Guarani

- Campeonato Paulista Série A2: 2018

Atlético Goianiense

- Campeonato Goiano: 2024

== Club career ==
=== São Paulo ===
Born in Campinas, Lucas Kal joined São Paulo's youth setup in 2011, aged 14. He was promoted to the first team for the 2017 season, but after being only the eight-choice in the squad, he was loaned to Paraná on 20 March of that year.

Lucas Kal returned to his parent club in August 2017, and was assigned to the B-team for the year's Copa Paulista. On 20 December, still owned by São Paulo, he was presented at Guarani, where he helped the club achieve promotion from the Campeonato Paulista Série A2 as champions.

Lucas Kal made first team – and Série A – debut for Tricolor on 29 July 2018, coming on as a late substitute for fellow youth graduate Luan in a 2–0 away win over Cruzeiro on 29 July 2018. On 30 August, he moved to fellow top-tier side Vasco da Gama on loan until the following April, but was recalled on 14 December after just one match.

Again a backup option at São Paulo, Lucas Kal renewed his contract until 2022 on 5 April 2019.

==== América Mineiro (loan) ====
On 6 September, Lucas Kal moved to Série B side América Mineiro on loan until the end of the year. He scored his first professional goal on 15 October 2019, netting América's opener in a 2–0 home success over Vila Nova.

On 2 December 2019, his loan was renewed for a further year.

==== Nacional (loan) ====
On 26 July 2020, Lucas Kal left América and moved abroad, after agreeing to a one-year loan deal with Primeira Liga side C.D. Nacional. He featured regularly for his new side, but was suffered team relegation.

=== Return to América Mineiro ===
On 11 June 2021, Lucas Kal returned to América on loan until March 2022. He only started to feature regularly in September, as a defensive midfielder, and scored his first goal in the top tier on 11 September, netting his side's second in a 2–0 home win over Athletico Paranaense.

On 7 January 2022, Lucas Kal signed a permanent deal with Coelho until June 2024, with São Paulo keeping 40% of his economic rights.

=== Al-Riyadh ===
On 19 August 2024, Lucas Kal joined Saudi Pro League club Al-Riyadh on a free transfer.

=== Nantong Zhiyun ===
On 4 February 2026, Lucas Kal joined China League One club Nantong Zhiyun.

== Career statistics ==
As of match played 7 November 2026

Appearances and goals by club, season and competition
Club	Season	League			State league		Cup		Continental		Other		Total	
Club	Season	Division	Apps	Goals	Apps	Goals	Apps	Goals	Apps	Goals	Apps	Goals	Apps	Goals
São Paulo	2016	Série A	0	0	—		0	0	—		6 (Note: Appearance(s) in Copa Paulista)	0	6	0
São Paulo	2017	Série A	0	0	—		0	0	—		6	0	6	0
São Paulo	2018	Série A	1	0	—		0	0	—		—		1	0
São Paulo	2019	Série A	0	0	0	0	0	0	—		—		0	0
São Paulo	Total		1	0	0	0	0	0	—		12	0	13	0
Paraná (loan)	2017	Série B	0	0	0	0	—		—		—		0	0
Guarani (loan)	2018	Série B	0	0	11	0	—		—		—		11	0
Vasco da Gama (loan)	2018	Série A	1	0	—		—		—		—		1	0
América Mineiro (loan)	2019	Série B	15	1	—		—		—		—		15	1
América Mineiro (loan)	2020	Série B	0	0	10	0	3	0	—		—		13	0
América Mineiro (loan)	Total		15	1	10	0	3	0	—		—		28	1
Nacional (loan)	2020–21	Primeira Liga	24	0	—		1	0	—		0	0	25	0
América Mineiro	2021	Série A	20	1	—		—		—		—		20	1
América Mineiro	2022	Série A	28	0	6	0	4	0	8 (Note: Appearance(s) in Copa Libertadores)	0	—		46	0
América Mineiro	2023	Série A	19	0	5	0	6	0	7 (Note: Appearance(s) in Copa Sudamericana)	1	—		37	1
América Mineiro	2024	Série B	—		1	0	—		—		—		1	0
América Mineiro	Total		67	1	12	0	10	0	15	1	—		103	2
Atlético Goianiense	2024	Série A	17	0	5	0	2	0	—		—		24	0
Al-Riyadh	2024–25	Saudi Pro League	30	3	—		1	0	—		—		31	3
Sport Recife	2025	Série A	13	0	—		—		—		—		13	0
Nantong Zhiyun	2026	China League One	29	3	—		0	0	—		—		29	3
Career total			197	6	38	0	17	0	15	1	12	0	279	9
