= Bader Al-Mutairi =

Kuwaiti footballer

Personal information
- Full name: Bader Mohammed Rashed Al-Mutairi
- Date of birth: 26 September 2003 (age 23)
- Place of birth: Kuwait
- Height: 1.75 m (5 ft 9 in)
- Position: Attacking midfielder

Team information
- Current team: Al-Arabi
- Number: 12

Youth career
- 2017-2023: Al-Arabi

Senior career*
Years	Team	Apps	(Gls)
2023–	Al-Arabi	13	(0)

International career^{‡}
2020-2023	Kuwait U-20	7	(0)
2022-	Kuwait U-23	10	(0)
- * Club domestic league appearances and goals as of 3 May 2025 ‡ National team caps and goals as of 31 December 2024

Bader Al-Mutairi (born 26 September 2003) is a Kuwaiti professional soccer player who plays as an attacking midfielder for Al-Arabi and Kuwait national football team.

== Club career ==
Al-Mutairi signed a 5 year contract at the start of the 2023-24 season and became a substitute for the club and making 3 appearances in the 2023 AFC Cup in his debut season. The following year at the beginning of the season he tore his ACL sidelining him for the rest of the season, but came back to the squad at the end of the season.

== National career ==
Al-Mutairi was called up to both Kuwait U-23 and Kuwait but untimely dropped from the first team pre squad selection.

== Career statistics ==
=== Club ===
As of 21 May 2025

Appearances and goals by club, season and competition
Club	Season	League			Cup		Continental		Other (Note: All appearance(s) in Kuwait Crown Prince Cup, Kuwait Super Cup)		Total	
Club	Season	Division	Apps	Goals	Apps	Goals	Apps	Goals	Apps	Goals	Apps	Goals
Al-Arabi	2023–24	KPL	11	0	1	0	3 (Note: All appearance(s) in AFC Cup)	0	1	0	17	0
Al-Arabi	2024-25	KPL	2	0	0	0	0 (Note: All appearance(s) in AFC Challenge League)	0	0	0	2	0
Al-Arabi	Career total		13	0	1	0	3	0	2	0	19	0
