= Mohamed Konaté (footballer, born 1997) =

Footballer (born 1997)

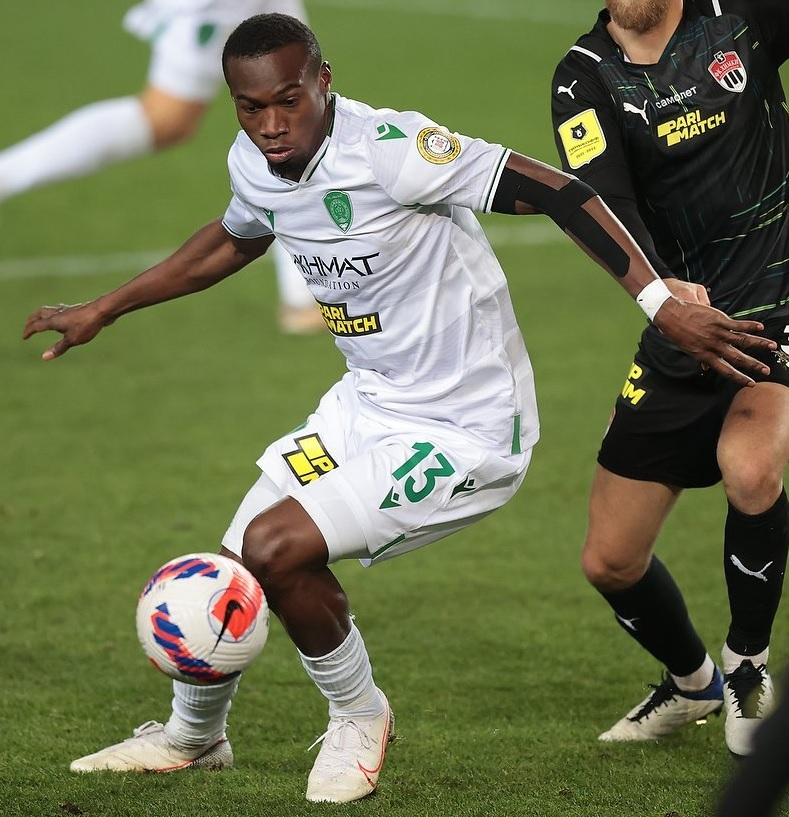
- Konaté with Akhmat Grozny in 2021

Personal information
- Date of birth: 12 December 1997 (age 28)
- Place of birth: Odienné, Ivory Coast
- Height: 1.91 m (6 ft 3 in)
- Position: Forward

Team information
- Current team: Akhmat Grozny
- Number: 13

Youth career
- –2016: AS Denguélé
- 2016: FC Saxan

Senior career*
Years	Team	Apps	(Gls)
2016–2017	Ural Yekaterinburg	4	(0)
2017	Babīte	1	(1)
2017	Kairat Academy	12	(3)
2018	Gomel	12	(2)
2018–2019	Pyunik	15	(6)
2019	Tambov	2	(0)
2019–2021	Khimki	34	(3)
2021–2024	Akhmat Grozny	80	(30)
2024–2025	Al-Riyadh	27	(4)
2025–	Akhmat Grozny	30	(2)

International career^{‡}
2020–	Burkina Faso	44	(7)
- * Club domestic league appearances and goals as of 21 November 2026 ‡ National team caps and goals as of 5 June 2026

Mohamed Konaté (born 12 December 1997) is a professional footballer who plays as a forward for Russian club Akhmat Grozny. Born in Ivory Coast, he represents Burkina Faso at international level.

== Club career ==
Konaté made his debut in the Russian Premier League for Ural Yekaterinburg on 17 September 2016, in a game against Anzhi Makhachkala. Konaté left Ural Yekaterinburg in February 2017 in pursuit of more first team football. On 22 April 2017, he debuted for his new club, Latvian Babīte, and scored on his debut.

In July 2017, Konaté and Cédric Gogoua joined Kairat's academy side Kairat-A until the end of the 2017 season. Following the completion of the 2017 Kazakhstan First Division, Konaté went on trial with Belarusian Premier League side Gomel.

On 24 June 2018, Pyunik announced the signing of Konaté. On 1 June 2019, Konaté was released by Pyunik.

On 2 September 2019, he signed with the Russian Football National League side Khimki.

On 18 May 2021, Akhmat Grozny announced the signing of Konaté on a one-year contract, with the option of additional two years. On 31 May 2024, Konaté left Akhmat as his contract expired.

Konaté joined Saudi Pro League club Al-Riyadh on 21 August 2024.

On 8 July 2025, Konaté returned to Akhmat Grozny and signed a three-year contract.

== International career ==
Born in the Ivory Coast, Konaté is of Burkinabé descent. On 9 October 2020, Konaté represented the Burkina Faso national team in a friendly 3–0 win over DR Congo. He played his first official match on 12 November 2020 against Malawi in qualifiers at 2021 Africa Cup of Nations.

He scored his first goal on 2 September 2021 against Niger in qualifiers at the 2022 FIFA World Cup.

Konaté is selected to participate in 2021 Africa Cup of Nations. He comes into play in five games during the competition, transforming his shot to goal in the eighth final won against Gabon.

He also participates in 2023 Africa Cup of Nations. He is the leading player in the attack on three occasions, including scoring a goal in against Algeria.

On 8 December 2025, Konaté was named among the 25 players selected by head coach Brama Traoré to represent Burkina Faso at the 2025 Africa Cup of Nations.

== Personal life ==
In August 2023, he received Russian citizenship.

== Career statistics ==
=== Club ===
As of match played 21 November 2026

Appearances and goals by club, season and competition
Club	Season	League			National cup		Continental		Other		Total	
Club	Season	Division	Apps	Goals	Apps	Goals	Apps	Goals	Apps	Goals	Apps	Goals
Ural Yekaterinburg	2016–17	Russian Premier League	4	0	1	1	–		2 (Note: Appearances in FNL Cup)	0	7	1
Babīte	2017	Virslīga	1	1	0	0	–		–		1	1
Kairat-A	2017	Kazakhstan First Division	12	3	0	0	–		–		12	3
Gomel	2018	Belarusian Premier League	12	2	0	0	–		–		12	2
Pyunik	2018–19	Armenian Premier League	15	6	1	0	6 (Note: Appearances in UEFA Europa League)	2	–		22	8
Tambov	2019–20	Russian Premier League	2	0	0	0	–		–		2	0
Khimki	2019–20	Russian Football National League	8	0	3	0	–		–		11	0
Khimki	2020–21	Russian Premier League	26	3	3	2	–		–		29	5
Khimki	Total		34	3	6	2	–		–		40	5
Akhmat Grozny	2021–22	Russian Premier League	27	8	0	0	–		–		27	8
Akhmat Grozny	2022–23	Russian Premier League	24	11	4	2	–		–		28	13
Akhmat Grozny	2023–24	Russian Premier League	29	11	6	2	–		–		35	13
Akhmat Grozny	Total		80	30	10	4	–		–		90	34
Al-Riyadh	2024–25	Saudi Pro League	27	4	2	0	–		–		29	4
Akhmat Grozny	2025–26	Russian Premier League	20	1	5	1	–		–		25	2
Akhmat Grozny	2026–27	Russian Premier League	10	1	4	0	–		–		14	1
Akhmat Grozny	Total		30	2	9	1	0	0	0	0	39	3
Akhmat Grozny	Club total		110	32	19	5	0	0	0	0	129	37
Career total			217	51	29	8	6	2	2	0	254	61

=== International ===
As of match played 5 June 2026

Appearances and goals by national team and year
National team	Year	Apps	Goals
Burkina Faso	2020	4	0
Burkina Faso	2021	7	2
Burkina Faso	2022	5	0
Burkina Faso	2023	5	1
Burkina Faso	2024	11	4
Burkina Faso	2025	9	0
Burkina Faso	2026	3	0
Total		44	7

Scores and results list Burkina Faso's goal tally first, score column indicates score after each Konaté goal.

List of international goals scored by Mohamed Konaté
No.	Date	Venue	Opponent	Score	Result	Competition
1	2 September 2021	Stade de Marrakech, Marrakesh, Morocco	Niger	2–0	2–0	2022 FIFA World Cup qualification
2	8 October 2021	Stade de Marrakech, Marrakesh, Morocco	Djibouti	4–0	4–0	2022 FIFA World Cup qualification
3	17 October 2023	Père Jégo Stadium, Casablanca, Morocco	Mauritania	1–0	2–1	Friendly
4	5 January 2024	Kish Olympic Stadium, Kish, Iran	Iran	1–0	1–2	Friendly
5	10 January 2024	Baniyas Stadium, Abu Dhabi, United Arab Emirates	DR Congo	2–0	2–1	Friendly
6	20 January 2024	Stade de la Paix, Bouaké, Ivory Coast	Algeria	1–0	2–2	2023 Africa Cup of Nations
7	13 October 2024	Felix Houphouet Boigny Stadium, Abidjan, Ivory Coast	Burundi	1–0	2–0	2025 Africa Cup of Nations qualification
