= Khalid Al-Shuwayyi =

Saudi Arabian association football player

Personal information
- Full name: Khalid Ibrahim Al-Shuwayyi
- Date of birth: 8 April 1996 (age 30)
- Place of birth: Saudi Arabia
- Height: 1.76 m (5 ft 9 in)
- Position: Defender

Team information
- Current team: Al-Bukiryah
- Number: 75

Youth career
- Al-Nassr

Senior career*
Years	Team	Apps	(Gls)
2017–2021	Al-Nassr	1	(0)
2019	→ Al-Mujazzal (loan)	14	(0)
2019–2020	→ Al-Tai (loan)	35	(0)
2020–2021	→ Al-Jabalain (loan)	32	(0)
2021–2022	Al-Jabalain	37	(2)
2022–2024	Al-Riyadh	61	(1)
2024–	Al-Bukiryah	0	(0)
- * Club domestic league appearances and goals as of 22 October 2023 ‡ National team caps and goals as of 20 January 2019

Khalid Al-Shuwayyi (Arabic: خالد الشويع; born 8 April 1996) is a Saudi Arabian professional footballer who plays as a defender for Al-Bukiryah.

== Career ==
On 15 July 2024, Al-Shuwayyi joined Al-Bukiryah.
