= Bernard Mensah (footballer, born October 1994) =

Ghanaian footballer

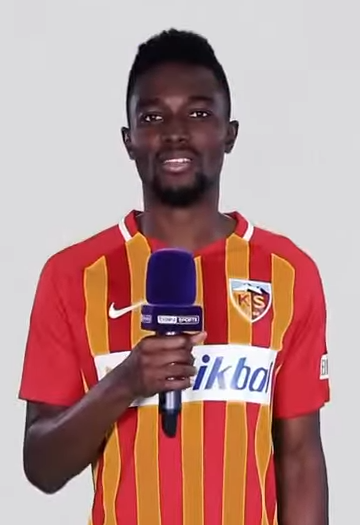
- Mensah in 2021

Personal information
- Full name: Bernard Mensah
- Date of birth: 17 October 1994 (age 32)
- Place of birth: Accra, Ghana
- Height: 1.80 m (5 ft 11 in)
- Position: Attacking midfielder

Team information
- Current team: Al-Riyadh
- Number: 43

Youth career
- 2010−2012: Feyenoord Ghana
- 2012−2013: Vitória Guimarães

Senior career*
| Years | Team | Apps | (Gls) |
| 2013–2014 | Vitória Guimarães B | 26 | (9) |
| 2014–2015 | Vitória Guimarães | 30 | (5) |
| 2015–2019 | Atlético Madrid | 0 | (0) |
| 2015–2016 | → Getafe (loan) | 8 | (0) |
| 2016–2017 | → Vitória Guimarães (loan) | 21 | (0) |
| 2017–2018 | → Kasımpaşa (loan) | 30 | (5) |
| 2018–2019 | → Kayserispor (loan) | 24 | (3) |
| 2019–2023 | Kayserispor | 58 | (12) |
| 2020−2021 | → Beşiktaş (loan) | 31 | (4) |
| 2023–2024 | Al-Tai | 30 | (14) |
| 2024–2025 | Al-Riyadh | 30 | (6) |
| 2025–2026 | Al-Nasr | 8 | (0) |
| 2026– | Al-Riyadh | 6 | (2) |

International career^{‡}
| 2015– | Ghana | 5 | (1) |
- * Club domestic league appearances and goals as of 24 October 2026 ‡ National team caps and goals as of 06:16, 6 June 2022 (UTC)

Bernard Mensah (born 17 October 1994) is a Ghanaian footballer who plays as an attacking midfielder.

== Club career ==
=== Vitória Guimarães ===
Born in Accra, Bernard joined Vitória de Guimarães' youth setup in 2012, after starting it out at Feyenoord Ghana. He made his senior debuts with the reserves in the 2012–13 campaign, scoring nine goals and earning promotion to Segunda Liga.

On 4 July 2014 Bernard renewed his contract until 2018, being promoted to the main squad on the 18th. He made his professional – and Primeira Liga – debut on 16 August, starting and scoring his side's second in a 3–1 away win against Gil Vicente FC.

Seven days later, Bernard scored a brace in a 3–0 home success over FC Penafiel. His fourth league goal came on 14 September, netting through a penalty in a 1–1 draw against FC Porto also at the Estádio D. Afonso Henriques.

Bernard was linked to a possible move to Manchester United in May 2015, being also a target of Juventus and Valencia CF. He finished his first season in the Portuguese top flight with 30 appearances and five goals, with his side finishing fifth.

=== Atlético Madrid ===
On 22 July, Bernard moved to Atlético Madrid on a six-year deal, being immediately loaned out to fellow La Liga side Getafe CF for the 2015-16 season.

==== Vitória de Guimarães (loan) ====
On 18 August 2016, Mensah returned to Vitória de Guimarães on a season-long loan deal.

=== Kayserispor ===
Mensah spent the 2018–19 season at Kayserispor on loan from Atlético Madrid with an option to buy. He played a total of 28 games and scored four goals. Kayserispor made the deal permanent in May 2019.

=== Al-Tai ===
On 15 July 2023, Mensah joined Saudi Pro League club Al-Tai on a free transfer. On 16 September 2023, Mensah scored his first goal from the penalty spot on the 12th minute of the game against Al-Hazm in the Saudi Professional League. On 21 September 2023, Mensah had a hat-trick against Al-Ettifaq in a 3–4 loss. Mensah won the November Player of the Month in the Saudi Pro League beating Cameroonian forward Georges-Kévin Nkoudou to win the award.

=== Al-Riyadh ===
On 20 August 2024, Mensah joined Al-Riyadh.

=== Al-Nasr ===
On 20 August 2025, Mensah joined Al-Nasr in the UAE Pro League club.

=== Al-Riyadh ===
In August 2026, Mensah returned to Saudi Pro League club Al-Riyadh after leaving UAE Pro League side Al-Nasr.

== International career ==
On 8 June 2015, Mensah made his debut for Ghana in a match against Togo, scoring the only goal of the game.

== Career statistics ==
As of match played 1 November 2024

Appearances and goals by club, season and competition
| Club | Season | League | | | National cup (Note: Includes Turkish Cup, King's Cup) | | Continental | | Total | |
| Club | Season | Division | Apps | Goals | Apps | Goals | Apps | Goals | Apps | Goals |
|---|---|---|---|---|---|---|---|---|---|---|
| Kasımpaşa (loan) | 2017–18 | Süper Lig | 30 | 5 | 2 | 0 | – | | 32 | 5 |
| Kayserispor (loan) | 2018–19 | Süper Lig | 24 | 3 | 4 | 1 | – | | 28 | 4 |
| Kayserispor | 2019–20 | Süper Lig | 25 | 5 | 1 | 0 | – | | 26 | 5 |
| Kayserispor | 2021–22 | Süper Lig | 6 | 2 | 0 | 0 | – | | 6 | 2 |
| Kayserispor | 2022–23 | Süper Lig | 27 | 5 | 4 | 0 | – | | 31 | 5 |
| Kayserispor | Total | | 58 | 12 | 5 | 0 | – | | 63 | 12 |
| Beşiktaş (loan) | 2020–21 | Süper Lig | 31 | 4 | 3 | 0 | 2 (Note: One appearance in UEFA Champions League, one appearance in UEFA Europa League) | 0 | 36 | 4 |
| Al-Tai | 2023–24 | Saudi Pro League | 30 | 14 | 1 | 0 | – | | 31 | 14 |
| Al-Riyadh | 2024–25 | Saudi Pro League | 9 | 2 | 1 | 0 | – | | 10 | 2 |
| Career total | | | 182 | 40 | 16 | 1 | 2 | 0 | 200 | 41 |

== Honours ==
Beşiktaş

- Süper Lig: 2020–21
- Turkish Cup: 2020–21

Individual

- Saudi Pro League Player of the Month: November 2023
