= Mohammed Al-Aqel =

Saudi Arabian footballer

Personal information
- Full name: Mohammed Saleh Mohammed Al-Aqel
- Date of birth: February 7, 2000 (age 26)
- Place of birth: Saudi Arabia
- Position: Winger

Team information
- Current team: Al-Najma (on loan from Al-Taawoun)
- Number: 90

Youth career
- Al-Lewaa
- Al-Tai

Senior career*
Years	Team	Apps	(Gls)
2019–2022	Al-Tai	43	(3)
2022–2025	Al-Riyadh	64	(2)
2025–	Al-Taawoun	7	(0)
2026–	→ Al-Najma (loan)	5	(1)
- * Club domestic league appearances and goals as of 11 April 2026

Mohammed Al-Aqel (Arabic: محمد العقل; born 7 February 2000) is a Saudi Arabian professional footballer who plays as a winger for Al-Najma, on loan from Al-Taawoun.

== Club career ==
Al-Aqel started his career at Al-Lewaa before moving to Al-Tai in 2018. He made his first-team debut during the 2019–20 season. He scored his first goal for the club on 7 January 2020 in the 2–1 win against Al-Taqadom. He made 21 appearances and scored twice in his first season at the club. In his second season, Al-Aqel made 15 appearances and scored once as Al-Tai earned promotion to the Pro League for the first time since 2008. He made his Pro League debut on 16 September in the 0–0 draw against Al-Batin.

On 20 July 2022, Al-Aqel joined First Division side Al-Riyadh. On 6 August 2025, Al-Aqel joined Al-Taawoun on a two-year deal. On 2 February 2026, Al-Aqel joined Al-Najma on a sex-month loan.
