= Sekou Lega =

French footballer (born 2003)

Personal information
- Full name: Sekou Bable Georges Lega
- Date of birth: 21 January 2003 (age 23)
- Place of birth: Paris, France
- Height: 1.92 m (6 ft 4 in)
- Position: Forward

Team information
- Current team: Al Bataeh
- Number: 70

Youth career
- 2009–2012: Évry
- 2012–2013: ES Cesson Vert Saint-Denis
- 2014–2014: US Grigny
- 2014–2016: Brétigny Foot CS
- 2016–2021: Lyon

Senior career*
Years	Team	Apps	(Gls)
2021–2025	Lyon II	74	(35)
2023–2025	Lyon	0	(0)
2023–2024	→ SC Bastia (loan)	6	(0)
2023	→ SC Bastia II (loan)	1	(1)
2025	Al-Riyadh	14	(1)
2025–2026	Kalba	6	(0)
2026–	Al Bataeh	8	(0)

International career^{‡}
2019	France U17	1	(0)
2022–2023	France U20	4	(0)
- * Club domestic league appearances and goals as of 27 May 2026 ‡ National team caps and goals as of 29 May 2023

Sekou Bable Georges Lega (born 21 January 2003) is a French professional footballer who plays as a forward for UAE Pro League club Al Bataeh.

== Early life ==
Born in Paris, situated in the Île-de-France region, Lega began his youth career by playing for regional clubs before joining Lyon football academy in 2016.

== Club career ==
On 1 July 2021, Lega signed his first professional contract with Lyon.

On 20 July 2023, Lega joined Ligue 2 side SC Bastia on loan for the 2023–24 season. On 10 January 2024, his loan spell to Bastia terminated after the club's agreement with Lyon.

On 31 January 2025, Lega joined Saudi Pro League side Al-Riyadh on a free transfer.

On 30 June 2025, Lega joined UAE Pro League side Kalba.

On 8 February 2026, Lega joined UAE Pro League side Al Bataeh.

== International career ==
Born in France, Lega is of Malian descent. He is a youth international for France.

Lega participated in the 2023 FIFA U-20 World Cup with France U-20. He played in two group stage matches but didn't score any goal as France failed to advance to the knockout stage.
