= Majed Al-Qahtani =

Saudi Arabian footballer

Personal information
- Full name: Majed Obaid Al-Qahtani
- Date of birth: September 13, 1990 (age 36)
- Place of birth: Saudi Arabia
- Height: 1.83 m (6 ft 0 in)
- Positions: Winger; right back

Team information
- Current team: Al-Oyon
- Number: 15

Youth career
- Hajer

Senior career*
Years	Team	Apps	(Gls)
2010–2015	Hajer		
2016–2018	Al-Adalah		
2018–2019	Al-Oyon		
2019–2020	Al-Rawdhah		
2021–2022	Al-Rawdhah		
2023–2024	Al-Taraf		
2024–2025	Al-Qarah		
2025–	Al-Oyon		
- * Club domestic league appearances and goals

Majed Al-Qahtani (Arabic: ماجد القحطاني; born September 13, 1990) is a Saudi football player who plays for Al Oyoon as a winger.
