= Hussain Al-Nowaiqi =

Saudi Arabian footballer

Personal information
- Full name: Hussain Ali Al-Nowaiqi
- Date of birth: 3 December 1995 (age 30)
- Place of birth: Saudi Arabia
- Height: 1.70 m (5 ft 7 in)
- Position: Right-back

Team information
- Current team: Al-Jabalain
- Number: 27

Youth career
- Al-Khaleej

Senior career*
Years	Team	Apps	(Gls)
2017–2023	Al-Khaleej	150	(4)
2023–2025	Al-Riyadh	40	(0)
2025–	Al-Jabalain	0	(0)
- * Club domestic league appearances and goals as of 31 May 2022

Hussain Al-Nowaiqi (Arabic: حسين النويقي; born 3 December 1995) is a Saudi Arabian professional footballer who plays as a right-back for Al-Jabalain.

== Career ==
Al-Nowaiqi started his career at Al-Khaleej's youth team. He made his debut during the 2017–18 season, he made 13 appearances in his debut season. On 20 July 2019, Al-Nowaiqi renewed his contract with Al-Khaleej. On 28 January 2020, Al-Nowaiqi scored his first goal for the club in the 2–1 win against Al-Jabalain. During the 2021–22 season, Al-Nowaiqi made 33 appearances and scored twice helping Al-Khaleej win the 2021–22 First Division. On 4 July 2022, Al-Nowaiqi renewed his contract with Al-Khaleej following their promotion to the Pro League. On 25 August 2022, Al-Nowaiqi made his Pro League debut in a 2–0 loss to Al-Hilal.

On 5 June 2023, Al-Nowaiqi joined Al-Riyadh on a free transfer.

In September 2025, Al-Nowaiqi joined Al-Jabalain.

== Honours ==
Al-Khaleej

- First Division: 2021–22
