= Abdulelah Al-Khaibari =

Saudi Arabian association football player (born 1997)

Personal information
- Full name: Abdulelah Mohammed Al-Khaibari
- Date of birth: 22 May 1997 (age 29)
- Height: 1.75 m (5 ft 9 in)
- Position: Left-back

Team information
- Current team: Al-Riyadh (on loan from Al-Ahli)
- Number: 80

Youth career
- Al-Riyadh

Senior career*
Years	Team	Apps	(Gls)
2014–2025	Al-Riyadh	196	(6)
2025–	Al-Ahli	4	(0)
2026–	→ Al-Riyadh (loan)	0	(0)
- * Club domestic league appearances and goals as of 30 October 2025

Abdulelah Al-Khaibari (Arabic: عبدالاله الخيبري; born 22 May 1997) is a Saudi Arabian football player who plays as a left back for Al-Riyadh, on loan from Al-Ahli.

== Career ==
Al-Khaibari began his career at Al-Riyadh and made his debut in the 2014–15 season. During the 2021–22 season, Al-Khaibari helped Al-Riyadh earn promotion to the First Division for the first time since 2016. During the 2022–23 season, Al-Khaibari captained Al-Riyadh to promotion to the Pro League for the first time since 2005. On 13 August 2023, Al-Khaibari made his Pro League debut for Al-Riyadh in a 1–0 home win against Al-Wehda. On 12 September 2024, Al-Khaibari made his 175th appearance for Al-Riyadh.

On 22 July 2025, Al-Khaibari joined Al-Ahli on a three-year contract.

On 20 January 2026, Al-Khaibari returned to Al-Riyadh on a six-month loan.

== Honours ==
Al-Riyadh

- Saudi Second Division third place: 2021–22 (Promotion to Saudi First Division)
- Saudi First Division fourth place: 2022–23 (Promotion to Pro League)

Al-Ahli

- Saudi Super Cup: 2025
