= Ahmed Assiri (footballer, born 1991) =

Saudi Arabian footballer (born 1991)

Personal information
- Full name: Ahmed Hassan Assiri
- Date of birth: November 14, 1991 (age 34)
- Place of birth: Jeddah, Saudi Arabia
- Height: 1.79 m (5 ft 10 in)
- Position: Centre back

Team information
- Current team: Al-Khaleej
- Number: 13

Youth career
- Al-Ittihad

Senior career*
Years	Team	Apps	(Gls)
2011–2019	Al-Ittihad	138	(8)
2019–2022	Al-Taawoun	47	(2)
2022–2023	Al-Faisaly	38	(0)
2023–2025	Al-Riyadh	49	(1)
2025–	Al-Khaleej	0	(0)

International career
2011	Saudi Arabia U-23	2	(0)
2013–	Saudi Arabia	11	(0)
- * Club domestic league appearances and goals as of 28 November 2024

Ahmed Assiri (Arabic: أحمد عسيري; born November 14, 1991) is a Saudi Arabian footballer, who plays for Al-Khaleej as a defender.

== Career ==
On 20 May 2019, Assiri joined Al-Taawoun.

On 7 January 2022, Assiri joined Al-Faisaly.

On 7 August 2023, Assiri joined Al-Riyadh.

On 4 August 2025, Assiri joined Al-Khaleej.

== Honours ==
Al Ittihad

- King Cup (1): 2013
- Crown Prince Cup (1): 2016–17
- King Cup of Champions: 2017–18
