= 2019–20 Al-Nassr FC season =

2019–20 season Al-Nassr's Football season

Al-Nassr
2019–20 season
- President: Safwan Al-Suwaiket
- Manager: Rui Vitória
- Stadium: Prince Faisal bin Fahd Stadium; King Fahd International Stadium
- Pro League: 2nd
- King's Cup: Semi-finals
- Saudi Super Cup: Winners
- AFC Champions League 2019: Quarter-finals
- AFC Champions League 2020: Semi-finals
- Top goalscorer: League: Abderrazak Hamdallah (29); All: Abderrazak Hamdallah (42)
- Highest home attendance: 17,078 vs Al-Ittihad (10 January 2020)
- Lowest home attendance: 8,617 vs Al-Wehda (5 August 2019)
- Average home league attendance: 13,136
Home colours	Away colours	Third colours
- All statistics correct as of 9 September 2020.

The 2019–20 season was Al-Nassr's 44th consecutive season in the top flight of Saudi football and 64th year in existence as a football club. Al-Nassr enter the season as the Saudi Pro League title holders. Along with the Pro League, the club competed in the King Cup and both the 2020 editions of the AFC Champions League.

The season covered the period from 1 July 2019 to 3 October 2020.

== Players ==
=== Squad information ===
As of 31 January 2020

Note: Flags indicate national team as defined under FIFA eligibility rules; some limited exceptions apply. Players may hold more than one non-FIFA nationality.

No.	Pos.	Nation	Player
1	GK	AUS	Brad Jones
2	DF	KSA	Sultan Al-Ghanam
3	DF	KSA	Abdullah Madu
4	DF	KSA	Omar Hawsawi (captain)
5	DF	KSA	Abdulelah Al-Amri
6	MF	BRA	Petros
7	FW	NGR	Ahmed Musa
8	MF	KSA	Yahya Al-Shehri
9	FW	MAR	Abderrazak Hamdallah
10	MF	BRA	Giuliano
11	MF	MAR	Nordin Amrabat
13	DF	KSA	Abdulrahman Al-Obaid
16	MF	KSA	Abdulaziz Al-Jebreen
15	MF	KSA	Abdullaziz Al-Dawsari
16	MF	KSA	Abdulaziz Al-Jebreen
17	MF	KSA	Abdullah Al-Khaibari
18	DF	BRA	Maicon (on loan from Galatasaray but was later bought permanently)

No.	Pos.	Nation	Player
20	DF	KSA	Hamad Al Mansor
21	MF	KSA	Mukhtar Ali
23	MF	KSA	Ayman Yahya
24	MF	KSA	Khalid Al-Ghannam
27	MF	KSA	Awadh Khamis
29	FW	KSA	Abdulfattah Adam
31	GK	KSA	Zaid Al-Bawardi
33	GK	KSA	Waleed Abdullah
37	DF	KSA	Naif Almas
38	MF	KSA	Fahad Al-Jumeiah
39	MF	KSA	Abdulrahman Al-Dawsari
42	FW	KSA	Firas Al-Buraikan
43	GK	KSA	Saleh Al Ohaymid
44	GK	KSA	Nawaf Al-Aqidi
46	MF	KSA	Khalid Al-Ghwinem
48	DF	KSA	Mansour Al-Shammari
50	FW	KSA	Mohammed Marran

=== Out on loan ===
Note: Flags indicate national team as defined under FIFA eligibility rules; some limited exceptions apply. Players may hold more than one non-FIFA nationality.

No.	Pos.	Nation	Player
14	FW	KSA	Saleh Al Abbas (at Abha until 30 June 2020)
21	DF	KSA	Mohammed Al-Shanqiti (at Al-Tai until 30 June 2020)
22	GK	KSA	Abdullah Al-Owaishir (at Al-Shabab until 30 June 2020)
25	MF	KSA	Nawaf Al-Farshan (at Al-Hazem until 30 June 2020)
30	MF	KSA	Abdulrahman Al-Dhefiri (at Al-Khaleej until 30 June 2020)
32	MF	KSA	Saud Zidan (at Al-Jabalain until 30 June 2020)
35	DF	KSA	Khaled Al-Showaie (at Al-Tai until 30 June 2020)
41	GK	KSA	Waleed Al-Enezi (at Al-Nojoom until 30 June 2020)
45	MF	KSA	Faraj Al-Ghushayan (at Al-Qadsiah until 30 June 2020)

No.	Pos.	Nation	Player
90	FW	KSA	Muteb Al-Hammad (at Al-Kawkab until 30 June 2020)
98	MF	KSA	Abdulrahman Al-Shanar (at Al-Kawkab until 30 June 2020)
—	DF	KSA	Khalid Al-Dubaysh (at Al-Adalah until 30 June 2020)
—	DF	KSA	Osama Al-Bawardi (at Al-Jabalain until 30 June 2020)
—	MF	KSA	Sami Al-Najei (at Damac until 30 June 2020)
—	DF	KSA	Abdulkareem Al-Muziel (at Al-Jabalain until 30 June 2020)
—	MF	KSA	Rakan Al-Shamlan (at Al-Wehda until 30 June 2020)
—	MF	KSA	Mohammed Al-Shahrani (at Damac until 30 June 2020)

== Transfers and loans ==
=== Transfers in ===
Entry date	Position	No.	Player	From club	Fee	Ref.
5 May 2019	FW	71	(Saudi Arabia) Abdullah Al Salem	(Saudi Arabia) Al-Fayha	$1,600,000	
24 May 2019	FW	14	(Saudi Arabia) Saleh Al Abbas	(Saudi Arabia) Najran	$1,340,000	
11 July 2019	GK	22	(Saudi Arabia) Abdullah Al-Owaishir	(Saudi Arabia) Ohod	Free	
13 July 2019	FW	29	(Saudi Arabia) Abdulfattah Adam	(Saudi Arabia) Al-Taawoun	$6,700,000	
1 September 2019	MF	21	(Saudi Arabia) Mukhtar Ali	(Netherlands) Vitesse	Undisclosed	
29 January 2020	MF	24	(Saudi Arabia) Khalid Al-Ghannam	(Saudi Arabia) Al-Qadsiah	$5,330,000	
31 January 2020	MF	15	(Saudi Arabia) Abdullaziz Al-Dawsari	(Saudi Arabia) Al-Faisaly	$267,000	

=== Transfers out ===
Exit date	Position	No.	Player	To club	Fee	Ref.
2 June 2019	FW	10	(Saudi Arabia) Mohammad Al-Sahlawi		Released	
27 June 2019	MF	14	(Saudi Arabia) Ibrahim Ghaleb	(Saudi Arabia) Al-Faisaly	Free	
1 July 2019	DF	12	(Saudi Arabia) Khalid Al-Ghamdi	(Saudi Arabia) Al-Faisaly	Free	
6 July 2019	DF	5	(Brazil) Bruno Uvini	(Qatar) Al-Wakrah	Free	
13 July 2019	DF	–	(Saudi Arabia) Salem Ali	(Saudi Arabia) Al-Shoulla	Free	
14 July 2019	DF	3	(Peru) Christian Ramos	(Peru) Universitario	Free	
15 July 2019	FW	–	(Democratic Republic of the Congo) Junior Kabananga	Qatar	$2,000,000	
18 July 2019	MF	30	(Morocco) Mohamed Fouzair	(Saudi Arabia) Al-Raed	$500,000	
9 August 2019	DF	–	(Saudi Arabia) Hamad Al-Aqeeli	(Saudi Arabia) Al-Thoqbah	Free	
25 August 2019	DF	40	(Saudi Arabia) Muteb Al-Mutlaq	(Saudi Arabia) Al-Raed	Undisclosed	
26 January 2020	FW	71	(Saudi Arabia) Abdullah Al Salem	(Saudi Arabia) Al-Ettifaq	Free	

=== Loans out ===
Start date	End date	Position	No.	Player	To club	Fee	Ref.
7 July 2019	2 September 2019	GK	43	(Saudi Arabia) Saleh Al Ohaymid	(Saudi Arabia) Abha	None	
11 July 2019	End of season	DF	35	(Saudi Arabia) Khaled Al-Showaie	(Saudi Arabia) Al-Tai	None	
11 July 2019	31 August 2019	MF	29	(Saudi Arabia) Rakan Al-Shamlan	(Saudi Arabia) Al-Shabab	None	
11 July 2019	End of season	MF	34	(Saudi Arabia) Mohammed Al-Shahrani	(Saudi Arabia) Damac	None	
13 July 2019	End of season	GK	22	(Saudi Arabia) Abdullah Al-Owaishir	(Saudi Arabia) Al-Shabab	None	
15 July 2019	End of season	MF	–	(Saudi Arabia) Abdulrahman Al-Dhefiri	(Saudi Arabia) Al-Khaleej	None	
17 July 2019	End of season	MF	–	(Saudi Arabia) Sami Al-Najei	(Saudi Arabia) Damac	None	
17 July 2019	20 January 2020	FW	90	(Saudi Arabia) Muteb Al-Hammad	(Saudi Arabia) Damac	None	
19 July 2019	End of season	DF	–	(Saudi Arabia) Khalid Al-Dubaysh	(Saudi Arabia) Al-Nassr	None	
18 August 2019	End of season	GK	41	(Saudi Arabia) Waleed Al-Enezi	(Saudi Arabia) Al-Nojoom	None	
23 August 2019	End of season	FW	14	(Saudi Arabia) Saleh Al Abbas	(Saudi Arabia) Abha	None	
24 August 2019	31 January 2020	DF	21	(Saudi Arabia) Mohammed Al-Shanqiti	(Saudi Arabia) Al-Taawoun	None	
25 August 2019	End of season	MF	98	(Saudi Arabia) Abdulrahman Al-Shanar	(Saudi Arabia) Al-Kawkab	None	
25 August 2019	End of season	MF	–	(Saudi Arabia) Osama Al-Bawardi	(Saudi Arabia) Al-Jabalain	None	
31 August 2019	End of season	MF	29	(Saudi Arabia) Rakan Al-Shamlan	(Saudi Arabia) Al-Wehda	None	
31 August 2019	End of season	MF	32	(Saudi Arabia) Saud Zidan	(Saudi Arabia) Al-Jabalain	None	
27 January 2020	End of season	FW	90	(Saudi Arabia) Muteb Al-Hammad	(Saudi Arabia) Al-Kawkab	None	
31 January 2020	End of season	MF	25	(Saudi Arabia) Nawaf Al-Farshan	(Saudi Arabia) Al-Hazem	None	
31 January 2020	End of season	DF	21	(Saudi Arabia) Mohammed Al-Shanqiti	(Saudi Arabia) Al-Tai	None	
1 February 2020	End of season	MF	45	(Saudi Arabia) Faraj Al-Ghashayan	(Saudi Arabia) Al-Qadsiah	None	

== Pre-season ==
19 July 2019 Friendly	Al-Nassr (Saudi Arabia)	3–0	(Portugal) Sacavenense	Óbidos, Portugal
10:30 WEST	Giuliano 13', 44'; Al Salem 67'	Report		Stadium: Estádio Municipal de Óbidos

22 July 2019 Friendly	Al-Nassr (Saudi Arabia)	1–0	(Portugal) Caldas	Óbidos, Portugal
11:00 WEST	Petros 77'	Report		Stadium: Estádio Municipal de Óbidos

27 July 2019 Friendly	Al-Nassr (Saudi Arabia)	2–2	(Portugal) Estoril	Ovar, Portugal
10:30 WEST	Hamdallah 43', 53' (pen.)	Report	Roberto 10'; Dadashov 88'

== Competitions ==
=== Overview ===
Competition	Record							
Competition	G	W	D	L	GF	GA	GD	Win %
Pro League	30	19	7	4	60	26	+34	63.33
King Cup	4	4	0	0	14	4	+10	100.00
Saudi Super Cup	1	0	1	0	1	1	+0	0.00
2019 Champions League	4	2	1	1	7	7	+0	50.00
2020 Champions League	9	5	3	1	13	6	+7	55.56
Total	48	30	12	6	95	44	+51	62.50

Updated to match played 3 October 2020
Source: Competitions

=== Saudi Super Cup ===
4 January 2020 Final	Al-Nassr	1–1 (5–4 p)	Al-Taawoun	Jeddah, Saudi Arabia
20:15 AST	Al-Khaibari (yellow card) 54'; Hamdallah 58'	Report	Tawamba 18'; Petrolina (yellow card) 35'; Al-Absi (yellow card) 40'; Al-Mousa (yellow card) 54'; Sandro Manoel (yellow card) 65'; Amissi (yellow card) 68'; Machado (yellow card) 90+2'; Al-Olayan (yellow card) 90+7'	Stadium: King Abdullah Sports City; Attendance: 40,514; Referee: Danny Makkelie (Netherlands)
	Penalties
	Hamdallah (penalty scored); Giuliano (penalty scored); Amrabat (penalty missed); Yahya Al-Shehri (penalty scored); Adam (penalty scored); Maicon (penalty scored)		(penalty scored) Sandro Manoel; (penalty scored) Petrolina; (penalty scored) Amissi; (penalty missed) Machado; (penalty scored) Héldon; (penalty missed) Al-Absi

=== Pro League ===
==== League table ====
Pos	Team	Pld	W	D	L	GF	GA	GD	Pts	Qualification or relegation
1	Al-Hilal (C)	30	22	6	2	74	26	+48	72	Qualification for AFC Champions League group stage
2	Al-Nassr	30	19	7	4	60	26	+34	64	Qualification for AFC Champions League group stage
3	Al-Ahli	30	15	5	10	49	36	+13	50	Qualification for AFC Champions League group stage
4	Al-Wehda	30	16	1	13	45	40	+5	49	Qualification for AFC Champions League play-off round
5	Al-Faisaly	30	14	6	10	41	36	+5	48	

Updated to match(es) played on 9 September 2020. Source: spl.com
Rules for classification: 1) Points; 2) Head-to-head points; 3) Head-to-head goal difference; 4) Total goal difference; 5) Total goals scored; 6) Fair-play points (Note: Head-to-head record is used only after all the matches between the teams in question have been played).
(C) Champions

==== Results summary ====
Overall								Home						Away					
Pld	W	D	L	GF	GA	GD	Pts	W	D	L	GF	GA	GD	W	D	L	GF	GA	GD
30	19	7	4	60	26	+34	64	9	4	2	31	15	+16	10	3	2	29	11	+18

Last updated: 9 September 2020.

==== Results by round ====
Round	1	2	3	4	5	6	7	8	9	10	11	12	13	14	15	16	17	18	19	20	21	22	23	24	25	26	27	28	29	30
Ground	H	A	H	H	A	H	A	A	H	A	H	A	A	H	A	A	H	A	A	H	A	H	H	A	H	A	H	H	A	H
Result	W	W	D	L	D	W	W	W	W	L	W	W	W	D	W	D	D	W	W	D	L	W	L	W	W	W	W	W	D	W
Position	3	2	2	5	5	8	6	5	2	2	1	1	1	2	1	2	2	2	2	2	2	2	2	2	2	2	2	2	2	2

Updated to match(es) played on 4 September 2020. Source:
A = Away; H = Home; W = Win; D = Draw; L = Loss

==== Matches ====
All times are local, AST (UTC+3).

Win Draw Loss Postponed

22 August 2019 1	Al-Nassr	2–0	Damac	Riyadh
19:00	Giuliano 24'; Hamdallah 45'	Report	Al-Najei (yellow card) 15'; Hazzam (yellow card) 18'	Stadium: King Fahd International Stadium; Attendance: 11,264; Referee: Matthew Conger (New Zealand)

30 August 2019 2	Al-Fateh	0–1	Al-Nassr	Al-Hasa
20:40	Naji (yellow card) 14'; Sayed Al-Dhaw (yellow card) 24'; Al-Zaqaan (yellow card) 58'; Buhimed (yellow card) 62'; Otaif (yellow card) 90+5'	Report	Al-Buraikan 49'; Al Mansor (yellow card) 88'	Stadium: Prince Abdullah bin Jalawi Stadium; Attendance: 12,663; Referee: Ovidiu Hațegan (Romania)

13 September 2019 3	Al-Nassr	0–0	Al-Shabab	Riyadh
20:35	Hamdallah (yellow card) 77'	Report	N'Diaye (yellow card) 32'; Salem (yellow card) 60'; Ben Mustapha (yellow card) 77'; Al Omran (yellow card) 79'	Stadium: King Fahd International Stadium; Attendance: 12,224; Referee: Daniel Stefanski (Poland)

20 September 2019 4	Al-Nassr	0–1	Al-Hazem	Riyadh
20:20	Al-Obaid (yellow card) 69'; Ali (yellow card) 80'	Report	Strandberg 14'; Al-Habib (yellow card) 45+3'; Muralha (yellow card) 45+5'; Alemão (yellow card) 87'	Stadium: King Fahd International Stadium; Attendance: 11,017; Referee: Svein Oddvar Moen (Norway)

27 September 2019 5	Al-Ahli	0–0	Al-Nassr	Jeddah
20:15	Hindi (yellow card) 84'	Report	Hamdallah (yellow card) 40'; Yahya (yellow card) 54'; Maicon (yellow card) 71'	Stadium: King Abdullah Sports City; Attendance: 30,198; Referee: Artur Soares Dias (Portugal)

19 October 2019 7	Al-Raed	0–2	Al-Nassr	Buraidah
18:10	Daoudi (yellow card) 13'; Al-Amri (yellow card) 45'; Djoum (yellow card) 51'; Al-Farhan (yellow card) 63'; Doukha (yellow card) 86'	Report	Hamdallah 18'; Ali (yellow card) 44'; Maicon (yellow card) 65'; Petros (yellow card) 70'; Amrabat (yellow card) 85'; Al-Shehri 90+3'	Stadium: King Abdullah Sport City Stadium; Attendance: 6,745; Referee: Tobias Welz (Germany)

27 October 2019 8	Al-Hilal	1–2	Al-Nassr	Riyadh
19:55	Carlos Eduardo 32'; Al-Breik (yellow card) 47'; Cuéllar (yellow card) 71'; Al-Abed (yellow card) 90'	Report	Al-Khaibari (yellow card) 37'; Hamdallah 55', 73', (yellow card) 74'; Petros (yellow card) 71'	Stadium: King Saud University Stadium; Attendance: 21,792; Referee: Xavier Estrada Fernández (Spain)

2 November 2019 9	Al-Nassr	4–0	Abha	Riyadh
19:50	Hamdallah 8', 45+1' (pen.); Al-Shehri 26'; Amrabat 58'	Report	Aashor (yellow card) 28'; Qaisi (yellow card) 41'; Al-Khathlan (yellow card) 44'; Atouchi (yellow card) 61'	Stadium: Prince Faisal bin Fahd Stadium; Attendance: 15,632; Referee: Viktor Kassai (Hungary)

6 November 2019 6	Al-Nassr	2–0	Al-Faisaly	Riyadh
19:55	Hamdallah 11'; Giuliano 28'; Al-Khaibari (yellow card) 43'; Hawsawi (yellow card) 71'	Report	Malayekah (yellow card) 39'; Hyland (yellow card) 59'	Stadium: Prince Faisal bin Fahd Stadium; Attendance: 11,718; Referee: Antonio Mateu Lahoz (Spain)

24 November 2019 10	Al-Wehda	1–0	Al-Nassr	Mecca
18:20	Anselmo (yellow card) 45+2', (goal) 60'; Niakaté (yellow card) 87'	Report	Hamdallah (yellow card) 43'; Petros (yellow card) 69'; Maicon (yellow card) 69'; Al-Ghanam (yellow card) 90+7'	Stadium: King Abdul Aziz Stadium; Attendance: 10,450; Referee: István Kovács (Romania)

13 December 2019 11	Al-Nassr	2–1	Al-Taawoun	Riyadh
19:45	Giuliano 31'; Adam 38'	Report	Amissi 19', (yellow card) 75'; Al-Olayan (yellow card) 24' (yellow-red card) 82'; Machado (yellow card) 57'; Al-Absi (yellow card) 83'	Stadium: Prince Faisal bin Fahd Stadium; Attendance: 15,297; Referee: Björn Kuipers (Netherlands)

19 December 2019 12	Al-Adalah	0–3	Al-Nassr	Al-Hasa
17:35	Al-Burayh (yellow card) 26'; Al-Ameri (yellow card) 58'; Al-Radhi (yellow card) 87'	Report	Amrabat 16'; Giuliano 43'; Musa (yellow card) 68'; Petros 83'	Stadium: Prince Abdullah bin Jalawi Stadium; Attendance: 9,299; Referee: Tamás Bognár (Hungary)

28 December 2019 13	Al-Fayha	1–4	Al-Nassr	Al Majma'ah
15:20	Fernández 11'; Arsénio (yellow card) 26'; Owusu (red card) 43'; Gegé (red card) 70'	Report	Jones (red card) 65'; Hamdallah 73' (pen.), 88', 90+1'; Al-Ghanam 81', (yellow card) 84'; Maicon (yellow card) 90'	Stadium: Al Majma'ah Sports City; Attendance: 4,042; Referee: Artur Soares Dias (Portugal)

10 January 2020 14	Al-Nassr	1–1	Al-Ittihad	Riyadh
20:05	Petros 47'; Giuliano (yellow card) 74'	Report	El Ahmadi (yellow card) 35'; Romarinho 50'; Al-Malki (yellow card) 76'	Stadium: Prince Faisal bin Fahd Stadium; Attendance: 17,078; Referee: Jesús Gil Manzano (Spain)

24 January 2020 15	Al-Ettifaq	0–1	Al-Nassr	Dammam
17:55	Kiss (yellow card) 75'; Souza (yellow card) 83'	Report	Hamdallah 35'; Al-Khaibari (yellow card) 58'; Al-Obaid (yellow card) 79'	Stadium: Prince Mohamed bin Fahd Stadium; Attendance: 11,710; Referee: Szymon Marciniak (Poland)

30 January 2020 16	Damac	1–1	Al-Nassr	Abha
16:00	Saidani (yellow card) 45'; Chafaï 52'; Zeghba (yellow card) 90+3'	Report	Ar. Al-Dawsari (yellow card) 20'; Hamdallah 90+8' (pen.)	Stadium: Prince Sultan bin Abdul Aziz Stadium; Attendance: 11,250; Referee: Miroslav Zelinka (Czech Republic)

6 February 2020 17	Al-Nassr	1–1	Al-Fateh	Riyadh
18:20	Hamdallah 62' (pen.)	Report	Wikheim (yellow card) 37'; Saâdane (yellow card) 61'; Al-Hassan 70'	Stadium: Prince Faisal bin Fahd Stadium; Attendance: 10,922; Referee: Ivan Bebek (Croatia)

14 February 2020 18	Al-Shabab	2–4	Al-Nassr	Riyadh
18:25	Diop (yellow card) 30' (yellow-red card) 90+1'; Asprilla 36', (yellow card) 84'; N'Diaye (yellow card) 56'; Guanca 59'; Al-Sulayhem (yellow card) 64'; Ben Mustapha (yellow card) 86'; Salem (yellow card) 90'	Report	Hamdallah 14', 82', 90+2' (pen.), (yellow card) 90+3'; S. Al-Ghanam (yellow card) 62'; Amrabat (yellow card) 88'; K. Al-Ghannam 90+4'	Stadium: Prince Faisal bin Fahd Stadium; Attendance: 12,719; Referee: Ovidiu Hațegan (Romania)

22 February 2020 19	Al-Hazem	0–2	Al-Nassr	Ar Rass
18:40	Al-Zubaidi (yellow card) 43'	Report	Al-Amri 54'; Al-Shehri 88'	Stadium: Al-Hazem Club Stadium; Attendance: 3,435; Referee: Jorge Sousa (Portugal)

27 February 2020 20	Al-Nassr	2–2	Al-Ahli	Riyadh
20:40	Giuliano 58', 66'; Al-Ghanam (yellow card) 69'; Al-Amri (yellow card) 74'	Report	Petros 32' (o.g.); Al Somah 43' (pen.); Bassas (yellow card) 51'; Marin (yellow card) 52'; Abdulghani (yellow card) 67'; Belaïli (yellow card) 77'; Djaniny (yellow card) 90'	Stadium: Prince Faisal bin Fahd Stadium; Attendance: 13,069; Referee: Damir Skomina (Slovenia)

7 March 2020 21	Al-Faisaly	3–2	Al-Nassr	Al Majma'ah
18:40	Rossi 15', (yellow card) 27'; Guilherme 28', 63'; Kaabi (yellow card) 86'; Hyland (yellow card) 90+3'	Report	Petros 7', (yellow card) 43'; Giuliano 30'; Al-Obaid (yellow card) 59'	Stadium: Al Majma'ah Sports City; Attendance: 0 (Note: Matches from 7 March and onwards will be played behind closed doors due to concerns over the coronavirus pandemic.); Referee: Danny Makkelie (Netherlands)

12 March 2020 22	Al-Nassr	4–1	Al-Raed	Riyadh
20:40	Hamdallah 19', 90+4'; Giuliano 24'; Ali (yellow card) 46'; Amrabat 86'	Report	Al-Ghamdi 8', (yellow card) 73'; Al-Fahad (yellow card) 79'; Al-Showaish (yellow card) 90+1'	Stadium: Prince Faisal bin Fahd Stadium; Attendance: 0 Referee: Tamás Bognár (Hungary)

5 August 2020 23	Al-Nassr	1–4	Al-Hilal	Riyadh
21:00	Hamdallah (yellow card) 41'; S. Al-Ghanam 45+1'; Al-Amri (yellow card) 87'; Ali (yellow card) 90+5'	Report	Al-Shahrani (yellow card) 9'; Giovinco 35'; Gomis 55' (pen.), 80'; Carlos Eduardo 60'	Stadium: King Fahd International Stadium; Attendance: 0 Referee: Benoît Bastien (France)

10 August 2020 24	Abha	0–2	Al-Nassr	Abha
19:15	Tahrat (yellow card) 35'; Al-Khathlan (yellow card) 41'; Barnawi (red card) 57'	Report	Hamdallah 58' (pen.); Musa 62'	Stadium: Prince Sultan bin Abdul Aziz Stadium; Attendance: 0 Referee: Nikola Dabanović (Montenegro)

15 August 2020 25	Al-Nassr	1–0	Al-Wehda	Riyadh
20:50	Giuliano (yellow card) 39'; Hamdallah 45+2'; S. Al-Ghanam (yellow card) 45+4'; Khamis (yellow card) 53'; Maicon (yellow card) 82'; Az. Al-Dawsari (yellow card) 90+1'	Report	Al-Nemer (red card) 25'; Botía (yellow card) 76'	Stadium: King Fahd International Stadium; Attendance: 0 Referee: Pavel Královec (Czech Republic)

20 August 2020 26	Al-Taawoun	1–4	Al-Nassr	Buraidah
19:10	Héldon 54'	Report	Hamdallah 5', 49', 81' (pen.); Amrabat 17', (yellow card) 55'	Stadium: King Abdullah Sport City Stadium; Attendance: 0 Referee: Néstor Pitana (Argentina)

25 August 2020 27	Al-Nassr	6–1	Al-Adalah	Riyadh
20:50	Hamdallah 14', 45+4'; Giuliano 17', 43'; Musa 28'; Ali (yellow card) 57'; Maicon (yellow card) 71'; Az. Al-Dawsari 90+2'	Report	Andriamatsinoro 13'; Al-Dubaysh (red card) 22'	Stadium: King Fahd International Stadium; Attendance: 0 Referee: Andris Treimanis (Latvia)

29 August 2020 28	Al-Nassr	2–1	Al-Fayha	Riyadh
20:40	Hamdallah 10' (pen.), 90+4'	Report	Andriatsima 7'; Al-Sobhi (yellow card) 71'; Al-Rashidi 90+2'	Stadium: Prince Faisal bin Fahd Stadium; Attendance: 0 Referee: Gediminas Mažeika (Lithuania)

4 September 2020 29	Al-Ittihad	1–1	Al-Nassr	Jeddah
20:35	Bony 11' (pen.), (yellow card) 34'; Al-Aboud (yellow card) 26'; El Ahmadi (yellow card) 68'	Report	Hamdallah 4'; Musa (yellow card) 28'; Al-Khaibari (yellow card) 69'; Petros (yellow card) 87'	Stadium: King Abdullah Sports City; Attendance: 0 Referee: Ivan Bebek (Croatia)

9 September 2020 30	Al-Nassr	3–2	Al-Ettifaq	Riyadh
20:35	Hamdallah 7' (pen.); Maicon (yellow card) 38'; Giuliano 45+2'; Adam 72'; Al-Obaid (yellow card) 84'	Report	Al-Amri 19'; Al-Hazaa 90+2'	Stadium: Prince Faisal bin Fahd Stadium; Attendance: 0 Referee: João Pinheiro (Portugal)

=== King Cup ===
All times are local, AST (UTC+3).

9 November 2019 Round of 64	Afif	1–5	Al-Nassr	Al Majma'ah
16:20	Al-Harthi (yellow card) 7'; Ben Abda 78'	Report	Musa 23', 55'; Khamis 44'; Al Mansor 51'; Giuliano 71' (pen.)	Stadium: Al Majma'ah Sports City; Referee: Turki Al-Khudair

6 December 2019 Round of 32	Al-Nassr	4–1	Al-Bukayriyah	Riyadh
19:45	Al Mansor (yellow card) 15'; Hamdallah 32'; Petros 48'; Giuliano 49'; Amrabat 63'	Report	Ben Salah (yellow card) 66'; Al-Ghamdi 87'	Stadium: Prince Faisal bin Fahd Stadium; Referee: Shukri Al-Hanfoush

24 December 2019 Round of 16	Damac	2–4	Al-Nassr	Abha
15:40	Abo Shararah 37', 44'; Zezinho (yellow card) 54'; Abousaban (yellow card) 65'; Al-Najei (red card) 67'	Report	Hamdallah 45+5' (pen.), 83' (pen.), 84'; Al-Shehri 76'	Stadium: Prince Sultan bin Abdul Aziz Stadium; Referee: Bakary Gassama (Gambia)

17 January 2020 Quarter-finals	Al-Adalah	0–1	Al-Nassr	Al-Hasa
17:55	Al-Sultan (yellow card) 21'; Andria (yellow card) 74'	Report	Giuliano (yellow card) 26'; Hamdallah 51'; Ar. Al-Dawsari (yellow card) 68'	Stadium: Prince Abdullah bin Jalawi Stadium; Attendance: 9,669; Referee: Aleksei Kulbakov (Belarus)

27 October 2020 Semi-finals	Al-Ahli	1–2	Al-Nassr	Jeddah
	Al Somah 19'		Petros 45+3'; Martínez 85'	Stadium: King Abdullah Sports City

28 November 2020 Final	Al-Hilal	2–0	Al-Nassr	Riyadh
	Jang Hyun-soo 10'; Gomis 42' (pen.)			Stadium: King Fahd International Stadium

=== 2019 AFC Champions League ===
==== Knockout phase ====
===== Round of 16 =====
5 August 2019 First leg	Al-Nassr (Saudi Arabia)	1–1	(United Arab Emirates) Al-Wahda	Riyadh, Saudi Arabia
21:00 UTC+3	Hamdallah 17'; Al-Ghashayan (yellow card) 86'	Live Report; Stats Report	Awana (yellow card) 31'; Leonardo 53'; Milesi (yellow card) 87'	Stadium: King Fahd International Stadium; Attendance: 8,617; Referee: Ali Sabah (Iraq)

12 August 2019 Second leg	Al-Wahda (United Arab Emirates)	2–3 (3–4 agg.)	(Saudi Arabia) Al-Nassr	Abu Dhabi, United Arab Emirates
19:40 UTC+4	Al-Menhali 27'; Matar (yellow card) 40'; Al-Zaabi (yellow card) 73'; Tagliabúe 79'; Leonardo (yellow card) 83'	Live Report; Stats Report	Hamdallah 41'; Giuliano 45+1', 62'; Al-Khaibari (yellow card) 47'; Jones (yellow card) 56'; Al Mansor (yellow card) 69'; Al-Ghwinem (yellow card) 74'; Hawsawi (yellow card) 83'; Al-Obaid (yellow card) 86'	Stadium: Al Nahyan Stadium; Attendance: 5,742; Referee: Muhammad Taqi (Singapore)

===== Quarter-finals =====
26 August 2019 First leg	Al-Nassr (Saudi Arabia)	2–1	(Qatar) Al-Sadd	Riyadh, Saudi Arabia
20:45 UTC+3	Al-Jumeiah (yellow card) 30'; Al-Dawsari 44', (yellow card) 90+2'; Al-Ghanam (yellow card) 58'; Al Abbas (yellow card) 63'; Giuliano 72'	Live Report; Stats Report	Asad 21'; Afif (yellow card) 25'	Stadium: King Fahd International Stadium; Attendance: 16,911; Referee: Valentin Kovalenko (Uzbekistan)

16 September 2019 Second leg	Al-Sadd (Qatar)	3–1 (4–3 agg.)	(Saudi Arabia) Al-Nassr	Doha, Qatar
18:45 UTC+3	Afif 26'; Al-Haydos 59'; Bounedjah 83' (pen.)	Live Report; Stats Report	Amrabat (yellow card) 29'; Hamdallah 33'; Al-Khaibari (yellow card) 54'; Madu (yellow card) 79'	Stadium: Jassim bin Hamad Stadium; Attendance: 13,262; Referee: Hettikamkanamge Perera (Sri Lanka)

=== 2020 AFC Champions League ===
==== Group stage ====
The group stage draw was made on 10 December 2019 in Kuala Lumpur. Al-Nassr were drawn with Sepahan, Al-Sadd, and Al-Ain.

Pos	Team	Pld	W	D	L	GF	GA	GD	Pts	Qualification	NAS	SAD	SEP	AIN
1	(Saudi Arabia) Al-Nassr	6	3	2	1	9	5	+4	11	Advance to knockout stage	—	2–2	2–0	0–1
2	(Qatar) Al-Sadd	6	2	3	1	14	8	+6	9	Advance to knockout stage	1–1	—	3–0	4–0
3	(Iran) Sepahan	6	2	1	3	6	8	−2	7		0–2	2–1	—	0–0
4	(United Arab Emirates) Al-Ain	6	1	2	3	5	13	−8	5		1–2	3–3	0–4	—

Source: AFC
Rules for classification: Tiebreakers

11 February 2020 1	Al-Nassr (Saudi Arabia)	2–2	(Qatar) Al-Sadd	Riyadh, Saudi Arabia
18:15 UTC+3	Hamdallah 7'; Al-Obaid 53'; Ali (yellow card) 69'	Live Report; Stats Report	Al-Amri 9' (o.g.); Afif (yellow card) 41'; Al-Haydos 48'; Abubakar (yellow card) 65'; Ró-Ró (yellow card) 72'	Stadium: Prince Faisal bin Fahd Stadium; Attendance: 11,828; Referee: Chris Beath (Australia)

18 February 2020 2	Al-Ain (United Arab Emirates)	1–2	(Saudi Arabia) Al-Nassr	Al Ain, United Arab Emirates
18:55 UTC+4	Yaisien 18'; Barman (yellow card) 28'; Ahmed (yellow card) 56'	Live Report; Stats Report	Ali 57'; Almas (yellow card) 65'; Hamdallah 80'; Amrabat (yellow card) 83'; Giuliano (yellow card) 87'	Stadium: Hazza bin Zayed Stadium; Attendance: 7.326; Referee: Nawaf Shukralla (Bahrain)

15 September 2020 (Note: On 9 July 2020, AFC announced new schedule for 2020 AFC Champions League group stage. On 16 July 2020, AFC announced that Qatar would host 2020 AFC Champions League in the West region from the group stage to the semi-finals.) 3	Sepahan (Iran)	0–2	(Saudi Arabia) Al-Nassr	Doha, Qatar
21:00 UTC+3		Live Report; Stats Report	Hamdallah 29', 48'	Stadium: Jassim bin Hamad Stadium; Attendance: 0 Referee: Adham Makhadmeh (Jordan)

18 September 2020 4	Al-Nassr (Saudi Arabia)	2–0	(Iran) Sepahan	Doha, Qatar
21:00 UTC+3	Madu 32'; Hamdallah 41'; Al-Sulayhem (yellow card) 61'; Al-Obaid (yellow card) 70'	Live Report; Stats Report	Rafiei (yellow card) 64'; Noorafkan (yellow card) 72'	Stadium: Jassim bin Hamad Stadium; Attendance: 0 Referee: Ilgiz Tantashev (Uzbekistan)

21 September 2020 5	Al-Sadd (Qatar)	1–1	(Saudi Arabia) Al-Nassr	Doha, Qatar
18:00 UTC+3	Ró-Ró (yellow card) 60'; Bounedjah 87', (yellow card) 88'	Live Report; Stats Report	Al-Ghannam 22', (yellow card) 53'	Stadium: Jassim bin Hamad Stadium; Attendance: 0 Referee: Masoud Tufayelieh (Syria)

24 September 2020 6	Al-Nassr (Saudi Arabia)	0–1	(United Arab Emirates) Al-Ain	Doha, Qatar
18:00 UTC+3	Al-Khaibari (yellow card) 66'	Live Report; Stats Report	Laba 19'; Abdullah (yellow card) 22'; Shaker (yellow card) 52'; Hadeed (yellow card) 64'; Shiotani (yellow card) 67'	Stadium: Education City Stadium; Attendance: 0 Referee: Hussein Abo Yehia (Lebanon)

==== Knockout phase ====
27 September 2020 Round of 16	Al-Nassr (Saudi Arabia)	1–0	(Saudi Arabia) Al-Taawoun	Doha, Qatar
20:45 UTC+3	Asiri (yellow card) 35'; Hamdallah 75'; Al-Dawsari (yellow card) 90+2'	Live Report; Stats Report	Kadesh (yellow card) 83'; Al-Mousa (yellow card) 89'	Stadium: Education City Stadium; Attendance: 0 Referee: Ali Sabah (Iraq)

30 September 2020 Quarter-finals	Al-Nassr (Saudi Arabia)	2–0	(Saudi Arabia) Al-Ahli	Doha, Qatar
16:40 UTC+3	Martínez 13'; Asiri 55'; Al-Buraikan (yellow card) 88'	Live Report; Stats Report	Al-Majhad (yellow card) 6'; Hawsawi (yellow card) 78'	Stadium: Jassim Bin Hamad Stadium; Attendance: 0 Referee: Sivakorn Pu-udom (Thailand)

3 October 2020 Semi-finals	Al-Nassr (Saudi Arabia)	1–1 (a.e.t.) (3–5 p)	(Iran) Persepolis	Doha, Qatar
18:00 UTC+3	Hamdallah 36' (pen.); Al-Sulayhem (yellow card) 49'; Madu (yellow card) 78'	Live Report; Stats Report	Khalilzadeh (yellow card) 37'; Abdi 42'; Pahlavan (yellow card) 84' (yellow-red card) 104'; Amiri (yellow card) 90+1'	Stadium: Jassim Bin Hamad Stadium; Attendance: 0 Referee: Muhammad Taqi (Singapore)
	Penalties
	Madu (penalty scored); Martínez (penalty scored); Al-Obaid (penalty scored); Maicon (penalty missed)		(penalty scored) Kanaanizadegan; (penalty scored) Nemati; (penalty scored) Sarlak; (penalty scored) Khalilzadeh; (penalty scored) Shojaei

== Statistics ==
=== Appearances ===
Last updated on 3 October 2020.

No.	Pos	Nat	Player	Total		Pro League		King Cup		Super Cup		2019 ACL		2020 ACL	
No.	Pos	Nat	Player	Apps	Goals	Apps	Goals	Apps	Goals	Apps	Goals	Apps	Goals	Apps	Goals
Goalkeepers
1	GK	(Australia) AUS	Brad Jones	45	0	29	0	3	0	1	0	4	0	8	0
31	GK	(Saudi Arabia) KSA	Zaid Al-Bawardi	2	0	1+1	0	0	0	0	0	0	0	0	0
33	GK	(Saudi Arabia) KSA	Waleed Abdullah	2	0	0	0	1	0	0	0	0	0	1	0
44	GK	(Saudi Arabia) KSA	Nawaf Al-Aqidi	0	0	0	0	0	0	0	0	0	0	0	0
Defenders
2	DF	(Saudi Arabia) KSA	Sultan Al-Ghanam	43	2	28	2	2	0	1	0	4	0	8	0
3	DF	(Saudi Arabia) KSA	Abdullah Madu	28	1	17	0	1	0	1	0	2+1	0	6	1
4	DF	(Saudi Arabia) KSA	Omar Hawsawi	14	0	6+1	0	2	0	0	0	4	0	0+1	0
5	DF	(Saudi Arabia) KSA	Abdulelah Al-Amri	14	1	9+1	1	0	0	0	0	0	0	3+1	0
12	DF	(Saudi Arabia) KSA	Abdualziz Al-Alawi	1	0	0	0	0	0	0	0	0	0	0+1	0
13	DF	(Saudi Arabia) KSA	Abdulrahman Al-Obaid	30	1	19+3	0	1	0	0	0	2	0	4+1	1
18	DF	(Brazil) BRA	Maicon	41	0	28	0	4	0	1	0	2	0	6	0
20	DF	(Saudi Arabia) KSA	Hamad Al Mansor	10	1	0+4	0	3	1	0	0	2+1	0	0	0
34	DF	(Saudi Arabia) KSA	Abdulmajeed Abbas	1	0	0	0	0+1	0	0	0	0	0	0	0
36	DF	(Saudi Arabia) KSA	Osama Al-Khalaf	2	0	0	0	0	0	0	0	0	0	1+1	0
37	DF	(Saudi Arabia) KSA	Naif Almas	7	0	3+1	0	1	0	0	0	0	0	2	0
78	DF	(Saudi Arabia) KSA	Ali Lajami	1	0	0	0	0	0	0	0	0	0	1	0
Midfielders
6	MF	(Brazil) BRA	Petros	31	4	27	3	2+1	1	1	0	0	0	0	0
8	MF	(Saudi Arabia) KSA	Yahya Al-Shehri	21	4	8+8	3	1+1	1	0+1	0	0	0	2	0
10	MF	(Brazil) BRA	Giuliano	39	16	27+1	11	4	2	1	0	4	3	2	0
11	MF	(Morocco) MAR	Nordin Amrabat	37	5	28+1	4	3	1	1	0	2	0	2	0
14	MF	(Saudi Arabia) KSA	Sami Al-Najei	2	0	0	0	0	0	0	0	0	0	0+2	0
15	MF	(Saudi Arabia) KSA	Abdullaziz Al-Dawsari	11	1	0+7	1	0	0	0	0	0	0	1+3	0
16	MF	(Saudi Arabia) KSA	Abdulaziz Al-Jebreen	3	0	0+1	0	0+1	0	0	0	0	0	0+1	0
17	MF	(Saudi Arabia) KSA	Abdullah Al-Khaibari	31	0	18	0	2	0	1	0	4	0	5+1	0
19	MF	(Saudi Arabia) KSA	Abdulmajeed Al-Sulayhem	6	0	0	0	0	0	0	0	0	0	6	0
21	MF	(Saudi Arabia) KSA	Mukhtar Ali	29	1	11+9	0	1	0	0	0	0	0	4+4	1
22	MF	(Argentina) ARG	Pity Martínez	7	1	0	0	0	0	0	0	0	0	6+1	1
23	MF	(Yemen) YEM	Ayman Yahya	11	0	1+3	0	0+1	0	0	0	0	0	1+5	0
24	MF	(Saudi Arabia) KSA	Khalid Al-Ghannam	21	2	3+10	1	0	0	0	0	0	0	6+2	1
27	MF	(Saudi Arabia) KSA	Awadh Khamis	29	1	11+5	0	3	1	1	0	2+1	0	5+1	0
38	MF	(Saudi Arabia) KSA	Fahad Al-Jumeiah	21	0	4+10	0	2	0	0+1	0	4	0	0	0
39	MF	(Saudi Arabia) KSA	Abdulrahman Al-Dawsari	33	1	4+13	0	3	0	0	0	4	1	4+5	0
45	MF	(Saudi Arabia) KSA	Abdulfattah Asiri	5	1	0	0	0	0	0	0	0	0	5	1
46	MF	(Saudi Arabia) KSA	Khalid Al-Ghwinem	7	0	0+1	0	0+2	0	0	0	0+4	0	0	0
Forwards
7	FW	(Nigeria) NGR	Ahmed Musa	29	4	18+6	2	3+1	2	1	0	0	0	0	0
9	FW	(Morocco) MAR	Abderrazak Hamdallah	41	45	27	29	3	5	1	1	3	3	7	7
29	FW	(Saudi Arabia) KSA	Abdulfattah Adam	13	2	2+5	2	0+1	0	0+1	0	0	0	2+2	0
42	FW	(Saudi Arabia) KSA	Firas Al-Buraikan	18	1	1+8	1	1	0	0	0	0+2	0	1+5	0
50	FW	(Saudi Arabia) KSA	Mohammed Marran	0	0	0	0	0	0	0	0	0	0	0	0
Players sent out on loan this season
19	FW	(Saudi Arabia) KSA	Saleh Al Abbas	1	0	0	0	0	0	0	0	1	0	0	0
25	MF	(Saudi Arabia) KSA	Nawaf Al-Farshan	1	0	0	0	0	0	0	0	0+1	0	0	0
45	MF	(Saudi Arabia) KSA	Faraj Al-Ghushayan	1	0	0	0	0	0	0	0	0+1	0	0	0

=== Goalscorers ===
Rank	No.	Pos	Nat	Name	Pro League	King Cup	Super Cup	2019 ACL	2020 ACL	Total
1	9	FW	(Morocco)	Abderrazak Hamdallah	29	5	1	0	7	42
2	10	MF	(Brazil)	Giuliano	11	2	0	3	0	16
3	11	MF	(Morocco)	Nordin Amrabat	4	1	0	0	0	5
4	6	MF	(Brazil)	Petros	3	1	0	0	0	4
4	7	FW	(Nigeria)	Ahmed Musa	2	2	0	0	0	4
4	8	MF	(Saudi Arabia)	Yahya Al-Shehri	3	1	0	0	0	4
7	2	DF	(Saudi Arabia)	Sultan Al-Ghanam	2	0	0	0	0	2
7	24	MF	(Saudi Arabia)	Khalid Al-Ghannam	1	0	0	0	1	2
7	29	FW	(Saudi Arabia)	Abdulfattah Adam	2	0	0	0	0	2
10	3	DF	(Saudi Arabia)	Abdullah Madu	0	0	0	0	1	1
10	5	DF	(Saudi Arabia)	Abdulelah Al-Amri	1	0	0	0	0	1
10	13	DF	(Saudi Arabia)	Abdulrahman Al-Obaid	0	0	0	0	1	1
10	15	MF	(Saudi Arabia)	Abdullaziz Al-Dawsari	1	0	0	0	0	1
10	20	DF	(Saudi Arabia)	Hamad Al Mansor	0	1	0	0	0	1
10	21	MF	(Saudi Arabia)	Mukhtar Ali	0	0	0	0	1	1
10	22	MF	(Argentina)	Pity Martínez	0	0	0	0	1	1
10	27	MF	(Saudi Arabia)	Awadh Khamis	0	1	0	0	0	1
10	39	MF	(Saudi Arabia)	Abdulrahman Al-Dawsari	0	0	0	1	0	1
10	42	FW	(Saudi Arabia)	Firas Al-Buraikan	1	0	0	0	0	1
10	45	MF	(Saudi Arabia)	Abdulfattah Asiri	0	0	0	0	1	1
Own goal					0	0	0	0	0	0
Total					60	14	1	7	13	95

Last Updated: 3 October 2020

=== Clean sheets ===
Rank	No.	Pos	Nat	Name	Pro League	King Cup	Super Cup	2019 ACL	2020 ACL	Total
1	1	GK	(Australia)	Brad Jones	12	1	0	0	4	17
Total					12	1	0	0	4	17

Last Updated: 3 October 2020
