= 2021–22 Al-Nassr FC season =

Al-Nassr
2021–22 season
- President: Musalli Al-Muammar
- Manager: Mano Menezes (until 19 September); Pedro Emanuel (from 1 October until 10 November); Miguel Ángel Russo (from 6 December)
- Stadium: Mrsool Park
- Pro League: 3rd
- King's Cup: Quarter-finals (knocked out by Al-Hilal)
- AFC Champions League: Semi-finals (knocked out by Al-Hilal)
- Top goalscorer: League: Talisca (20 goals); All: Talisca (22 goals)
- Highest home attendance: 16,458 (vs. Al-Ettifaq, 24 October 2021)
- Lowest home attendance: 0 (vs. Al-Fayha, 17 March 2022)
- Average home league attendance: 8,380
Home colours	Away colours

The 2021–22 season was Al-Nassr's 46th consecutive season in the top flight of Saudi football and 66th year in existence as a football club. The club participated in the Pro League, the King's Cup, and the AFC Champions League.

The season covered the period from 1 July 2021 to 30 June 2022.

== Players ==
=== Squad information ===
As of 1 February 2022

Note: Flags indicate national team as defined under FIFA eligibility rules; some limited exceptions apply. Players may hold more than one non-FIFA nationality.

No.	Pos.	Nation	Player
1	GK	KSA	Amin Bukhari
2	DF	KSA	Sultan Al-Ghanam
3	DF	KSA	Abdullah Madu
4	DF	KSA	Mohammed Al-Fatil
5	DF	KSA	Abdulelah Al-Amri
7	MF	UZB	Jaloliddin Masharipov
8	MF	KSA	Abdulmajeed Al-Sulayhem
10	MF	ARG	Pity Martínez
11	MF	KSA	Khalid Al-Ghannam
14	MF	KSA	Sami Al-Najei
17	MF	KSA	Abdullah Al-Khaibari
18	DF	KSA	Mohammed Qassem
19	MF	KSA	Ali Al-Hassan
20	DF	KSA	Hamad Al Mansour
22	FW	URU	Jonathan Rodríguez

No.	Pos.	Nation	Player
26	FW	CMR	Vincent Aboubakar
28	MF	KSA	Ibrahim Al-Mahdawi
29	FW	KSA	Abdulfattah Adam
30	DF	KSA	Abdulkareem Al-Muziel
33	GK	KSA	Waleed Abdullah
42	DF	KSA	Mansour Al-Shammari
45	MF	KSA	Abdulfattah Asiri
54	MF	KSA	Basil Al-Sayyali
55	DF	ARG	Ramiro Funes Mori
57	GK	KSA	Raed Ozaybi
58	DF	KSA	Aser Hawsawi
59	DF	KSA	Yousef Haqawi
78	DF	KSA	Ali Lajami
87	MF	BRA	Anselmo (on loan from Al-Wehda)
94	MF	BRA	Talisca

=== Out on loan ===
Note: Flags indicate national team as defined under FIFA eligibility rules; some limited exceptions apply. Players may hold more than one non-FIFA nationality.

No.	Pos.	Nation	Player
21	MF	KSA	Mukhtar Ali (at Al-Tai until 30 June 2022)
23	MF	KSA	Ayman Yahya (at Al-Ahli until 30 June 2022)
27	DF	KSA	Osama Al-Khalaf (at Al-Hazem until 30 June 2022)
34	DF	KSA	Abdulmajeed Abbas (at Al-Shoulla until 30 June 2022)
35	DF	KSA	Khalid Al-Shuwayyi (at Al-Jabalain until 30 June 2022)
41	GK	KSA	Waleed Al-Enezi (at Al-Fateh until 30 June 2022)
44	GK	KSA	Nawaf Al-Aqidi (at Al-Tai until 30 June 2022)
46	MF	KSA	Khalid Al-Ghwinem (at Al-Shoulla until 30 June 2022)
50	DF	KSA	Abdulaziz Al-Alawi (at Al-Batin until 30 June 2022)

No.	Pos.	Nation	Player
52	FW	KSA	Khalil Al Absi (at Al-Kholood until 30 June 2022)
56	FW	KSA	Mohammed Marran (at Al-Tai until 30 June 2022)
86	DF	KSA	Nawaf Al-Mutairi (at Najran until 30 June 2022)
98	MF	KSA	Abdulrahman Al-Shanar (at Al-Jeel until 30 June 2022)
—	GK	KSA	Abdulrahman Al-Shammari (at Najran until 30 June 2022)
—	DF	KSA	Osama Al-Bawardi (at Al-Sahel until 30 June 2022)
—	DF	KSA	Abdullah Al-Shanqiti (at Al-Raed until 30 June 2022)
—	DF	KSA	Mohammed Daghriri (at Al-Okhdood until 30 June 2022)
—	DF	KOR	Kim Jin-su (at Jeonbuk Hyundai Motors until 30 June 2022)

== Transfers and loans ==
=== Transfers in ===
Entry date	Position	No.	Player	From club	Fee	Ref.
30 June 2021	GK	1	(Saudi Arabia) Amin Bukhari	(Saudi Arabia) Al-Ain	End of loan	
30 June 2021	GK	41	(Saudi Arabia) Waleed Al-Enezi	(Saudi Arabia) Al-Nojoom	End of loan	
30 June 2021	GK	43	(Saudi Arabia) Saleh Al-Ohaymid	(Saudi Arabia) Al-Ain	End of loan	
30 June 2021	GK	–	(Saudi Arabia) Abdulrahman Al-Shammari	(Saudi Arabia) Najran	End of loan	
30 June 2021	DF	20	(Saudi Arabia) Hamad Al Mansour	(Saudi Arabia) Al-Ittihad	End of loan	
30 June 2021	DF	30	(Saudi Arabia) Abdulkareem Al-Muziel	(Saudi Arabia) Al-Taawoun	End of loan	
30 June 2021	DF	34	(Saudi Arabia) Abdulmajeed Abbas	(Saudi Arabia) Al-Jabalain	End of loan	
30 June 2021	DF	35	(Saudi Arabia) Khalid Al-Shuwayyi	(Saudi Arabia) Al-Jabalain	End of loan	
30 June 2021	DF	37	(Saudi Arabia) Naif Almas	(Saudi Arabia) Al-Batin	End of loan	
30 June 2021	DF	48	(Saudi Arabia) Mansour Al-Shammari	(Saudi Arabia) Al-Tai	End of loan	
30 June 2021	DF	–	(Saudi Arabia) Osama Al-Bawardi	(Saudi Arabia) Al-Diriyah	End of loan	
30 June 2021	DF	–	(Saudi Arabia) Mohammed Al-Shanqiti	(Saudi Arabia) Al-Tai	End of loan	
30 June 2021	MF	25	(Saudi Arabia) Nawaf Al-Farshan	(Saudi Arabia) Al-Ain	End of loan	
30 June 2021	MF	32	(Saudi Arabia) Saud Zidan	(Saudi Arabia) Abha	End of loan	
30 June 2021	MF	38	(Saudi Arabia) Fahad Al-Jumayah	(Saudi Arabia) Abha	End of loan	
30 June 2021	MF	46	(Saudi Arabia) Khalid Al-Ghwinem	(Saudi Arabia) Al-Thoqbah	End of loan	
30 June 2021	MF	98	(Saudi Arabia) Abdulrahman Al-Shanar	(Saudi Arabia) Al-Diriyah	End of loan	
30 June 2021	MF	–	(Saudi Arabia) Mohammed Al-Shahrani	(Saudi Arabia) Al-Adalah	End of loan	
30 June 2021	MF	–	(Yemen) Ali Yahya	(Saudi Arabia) Al-Riyadh	End of loan	
30 June 2021	FW	12	(Saudi Arabia) Saleh Al Abbas	(Saudi Arabia) Al-Batin	End of loan	
30 June 2021	FW	29	(Saudi Arabia) Abdulfattah Adam	(Saudi Arabia) Al-Raed	End of loan	
1 July 2021	MF	94	(Brazil) Talisca	(China) Guangzhou	$9,500,000	
1 July 2021	FW	26	(Cameroon) Vincent Aboubakar	(Turkey) Beşiktaş	Free	
3 July 2021	MF	7	(Uzbekistan) Jaloliddin Masharipov	(Uzbekistan) Pakhtakor	$1,500,000	
22 July 2021	DF	55	(Argentina) Ramiro Funes Mori	(Spain) Villarreal	$3,000,000	
4 August 2021	DF	4	(Saudi Arabia) Mohammed Al-Fatil	(Saudi Arabia) Al-Ahli	Free	
4 August 2021	DF	58	(Saudi Arabia) Aser Hawsawi	(Saudi Arabia) Al-Wehda	Free	
7 August 2021	DF	18	(Saudi Arabia) Mohammed Qassem	(Saudi Arabia) Al-Faisaly	Free	
12 January 2022	FW	22	(Uruguay) Jonathan Rodríguez	(Mexico) Cruz Azul	$6,000,000	

=== Loans in ===
Start date	End date	Position	No.	Player	From club	Fee	Ref.
31 August 2021	End of season	MF	87	(Brazil) Anselmo	(Saudi Arabia) Al-Wehda	$2,900,000	

=== Transfers out ===
Exit date	Position	No.	Player	To club	Fee	Ref.
30 June 2021	FW	70	(Saudi Arabia) Raed Al-Ghamdi	(Saudi Arabia) Al-Raed	End of loan	
1 July 2021	DF	18	(Brazil) Maicon		Released	
1 July 2021	MF	15	(Saudi Arabia) Abdullaziz Al-Dawsari		Released	
1 July 2021	MF	39	(Saudi Arabia) Abdulrahman Al-Dawsari	(Saudi Arabia) Al-Faisaly	Free	
8 July 2021	MF	32	(Saudi Arabia) Saud Zidan	(Saudi Arabia) Al-Hazem	$800,000	
8 July 2021	FW	42	(Saudi Arabia) Firas al-Buraikan	(Saudi Arabia) Al-Fateh	$1,866,000	
8 July 2021	FW	90	(Saudi Arabia) Muteb Al-Hammad	(Saudi Arabia) Al-Hazem	Free	
13 July 2021	MF	38	(Saudi Arabia) Fahad Al-Jumayah	(Saudi Arabia) Abha	$800,000	
19 July 2021	MF	–	(Saudi Arabia) Mohammed Al-Shahrani	(Saudi Arabia) Al-Sahel	Free	
30 July 2021	MF	–	(Saudi Arabia) Muteb Al-Enezi	(Saudi Arabia) Al-Najma	Free	
5 August 2021	GK	1	(Australia) Brad Jones	(Australia) Perth Glory	Free	
5 August 2021	FW	–	(Saudi Arabia) Yahya Naji	(Saudi Arabia) Al-Wehda	Free	
16 August 2021	MF	11	(Morocco) Nordin Amrabat	(Greece) AEK Athens	Free	
19 August 2021	MF	88	(Saudi Arabia) Yahya Al-Shehri	(Saudi Arabia) Al-Raed	Free	
31 August 2021	FW	12	(Saudi Arabia) Saleh Al Abbas	(Saudi Arabia) Al-Faisaly	$650,000	
1 September 2021	GK	43	(Saudi Arabia) Saleh Al-Ohaymid	(Saudi Arabia) Al-Ittihad	Free	
3 September 2021	DF	–	(Saudi Arabia) Mohammed Al-Shanqiti	(Saudi Arabia) Al-Ain	Free	
2 January 2022	FW	9	(Morocco) Abderrazak Hamdallah	(Saudi Arabia) Al-Ittihad	Free	
3 January 2022	MF	6	(Brazil) Petros	(Saudi Arabia) Al-Fateh	Free	
9 January 2022	DF	13	(Saudi Arabia) Abdulrahman Al-Obaid	(Saudi Arabia) Al-Hilal	Free	
14 January 2022	DF	37	(Saudi Arabia) Naif Almas	(Saudi Arabia) Al-Fayha	$186,000	
15 January 2022	MF	25	(Saudi Arabia) Nawaf Al-Farshan	(Saudi Arabia) Hajer	Free	
11 February 2022	MF	–	(Saudi Arabia) Meshari Al-Mashhari	(Greece) Olympiacos B	Free	

=== Loans out ===
Start date	End date	Position	No.	Player	To club	Fee	Ref.
1 July 2021	End of season	DF	28	(South Korea) Kim Jin-su	(South Korea) Jeonbuk Hyundai Motors	None	
7 July 2021	21 January 2022	MF	54	(Saudi Arabia) Basil Al-Sayyali	(Saudi Arabia) Al-Tai	$53,000	
18 July 2021	End of season	DF	35	(Saudi Arabia) Khalid Al-Shuwayyi	(Saudi Arabia) Al-Jabalain	None	
26 July 2021	End of season	DF	86	(Saudi Arabia) Nawaf Al-Mutairi	(Saudi Arabia) Najran	None	
26 July 2021	End of season	DF	–	(Saudi Arabia) Mohammed Daghriri	(Saudi Arabia) Al-Okhdood	None	
26 July 2021	22 January 2022	MF	–	(Saudi Arabia) Nawaf Al-Osaimi	(Saudi Arabia) Al-Okhdood	None	
3 August 2021	31 January 2022	DF	–	(Saudi Arabia) Dhari Al-Anazi	(Saudi Arabia) Al-Jabalain	None	
3 August 2021	End of season	MF	98	(Saudi Arabia) Abdulrahman Al-Shanar	(Saudi Arabia) Al-Jeel	None	
6 August 2021	6 January 2022	DF	27	(Saudi Arabia) Osama Al-Khalaf	(Saudi Arabia) Al-Tai	None	
7 August 2021	End of season	DF	50	(Saudi Arabia) Abdulaziz Al-Alawi	(Saudi Arabia) Al-Batin	None	
7 August 2021	End of season	DF	55	(Saudi Arabia) Abdullah Al-Shanqiti	(Saudi Arabia) Al-Raed	None	
13 August 2021	End of season	DF	–	(Saudi Arabia) Osama Al-Bawardi	(Saudi Arabia) Al-Sahel	None	
30 August 2021	End of season	GK	41	(Saudi Arabia) Waleed Al-Enezi	(Saudi Arabia) Al-Fateh	None	
30 August 2021	End of season	GK	–	(Saudi Arabia) Abdulrahman Al-Shammari	(Saudi Arabia) Najran	None	
31 August 2021	End of season	MF	46	(Saudi Arabia) Khalid Al-Ghwinem	(Saudi Arabia) Al-Shoulla	None	
31 August 2021	End of season	FW	56	(Saudi Arabia) Mohammed Maran	(Saudi Arabia) Al-Tai	None	
10 September 2021	End of season	DF	34	(Saudi Arabia) Abdulmajeed Abbas	(Saudi Arabia) Al-Shoulla	None	
6 January 2022	End of season	DF	27	(Saudi Arabia) Osama Al-Khalaf	(Saudi Arabia) Al-Hazem	None	
7 January 2022	End of season	FW	52	(Saudi Arabia) Khalil Al-Absi	(Saudi Arabia) Al-Kholood	None	
10 January 2022	End of season	MF	23	(Saudi Arabia) Ayman Yahya	(Saudi Arabia) Al-Ahli	None	
29 January 2022	End of season	MF	21	(Saudi Arabia) Mukhtar Ali	(Saudi Arabia) Al-Tai	None	
30 January 2022	End of season	GK	44	(Saudi Arabia) Nawaf Al-Aqidi	(Saudi Arabia) Al-Tai	None	

== Pre-season ==
26 July 2021 Friendly	Al-Nassr (Saudi Arabia)	2–0	(North Macedonia) Akademija Pandev	Sofia, Bulgaria
17:30 EEST	Hamdallah 22'; Adam 82'	Report		Stadium: Winbet ARENA

29 July 2021 Friendly	Al-Nassr (Saudi Arabia)	0–0	(Cyprus) APOEL	Pravets, Bulgaria
18:00 EEST		Report		Stadium: Pravets Sports Complex

31 July 2021 Friendly	Al-Nassr (Saudi Arabia)	1–2	(Bulgaria) Arda Kardzhali	Sofia, Bulgaria
18:00 EEST	Talisca 85' (pen.)	Report	Juninho 52'; Yordanov 58'	Stadium: Boyana National Football Complex

8 August 2021 Friendly	Al-Nassr (Saudi Arabia)	5–0	(Saudi Arabia) Al-Shoulla	Riyadh, Saudi Arabia
19:05 AST	Talisca 33', 42'; Masharipov 36'; Aboubakar 69'; Asiri 74'	Report		Stadium: Mrsool Park

== Competitions ==
=== Overview ===
Competition	Record							
Competition	G	W	D	L	GF	GA	GD	Win %
Pro League	30	19	4	7	58	36	+22	63.33
King Cup	2	1	0	1	2	2	+0	50.00
Champions League	3	2	0	1	7	3	+4	66.67
Total	35	22	4	9	67	41	+26	62.86

Updated to match played 27 June 2022
Source: Competitions

=== Pro League ===
==== League table ====
Pos	Team	Pld	W	D	L	GF	GA	GD	Pts	Qualification or relegation
1	Al-Hilal (C)	30	20	7	3	63	28	+35	67	Qualification for AFC Champions League group stage (Note: Al-Fayha qualified for the AFC Champions League play-off round as 2021–22 King Cup winners.)
2	Al-Ittihad	30	20	5	5	62	29	+33	65	
3	Al-Nassr	30	19	4	7	58	36	+22	61	
4	Al-Shabab	30	15	10	5	52	36	+16	55	
5	Damac	30	12	8	10	38	44	−6	44	

Source: spl.com
Rules for classification: 1) Points; 2) Head-to-head points; 3) Head-to-head goal difference; 4) Total goal difference; 5) Total goals scored; 6) Fair-play points (Note: Head-to-head record is used only after all the matches between the teams in question have been played).
(C) Champions

==== Results summary ====
Overall								Home						Away					
Pld	W	D	L	GF	GA	GD	Pts	W	D	L	GF	GA	GD	W	D	L	GF	GA	GD
30	19	4	7	58	36	+22	61	10	2	3	31	19	+12	9	2	4	27	17	+10

Last updated: 27 June 2022.
Source: spl.com.sa

==== Results by round ====
Round	1	2	3	4	5	6	7	8	9	10	11	12	13	14	15	16	17	18	19	20	21	22	23	24	25	26	27	28	29	30
Ground	H	A	H	A	H	H	A	A	H	A	A	H	A	H	A	A	H	A	H	A	A	H	H	A	H	H	A	H	A	H
Result	W	L	W	L	L	W	W	W	L	D	L	D	W	W	W	W	W	W	W	L	W	W	L	D	W	W	W	D	W	W
Position	1	5	3	7	8	6	3	4	6	7	9	9	7	4	3	3	3	2	2	3	2	2	3	4	3	3	3	3	3	3

Updated to match(es) played on 27 June 2022. Source: spl.com.sa
A = Away; H = Home; W = Win; D = Draw; L = Loss

==== Matches ====
All times are local, AST (UTC+3).

Win Draw Loss Postponed

13 August 2021 1	Al-Nassr	4–1	Damac	Riyadh
19:05	Hamdallah 4' (pen.); Talisca 40'; Al-Najai 42' (o.g.); Petros (yellow card) 44'; Aboubakar 80'	Report	Chafaï (yellow card) 3'; Al-Najai (yellow card) 34'; Zelaya 51' (pen.)	Stadium: Mrsool Park; Attendance: 7,997; Referee: Abdulrahman Al-Jassim (Qatar)

19 August 2021 2	Al-Faisaly	2–1	Al-Nassr	Al Majma'ah
20:50	Tavares 45+4' (pen.), 50'; Rossi (yellow card) 71'; Amalfitano (yellow card) 90+4'	Report	Talisca 8'	Stadium: Al Majma'ah Sports City; Attendance: 2,616; Referee: Majed Al-Shamrani

26 August 2021 3	Al-Nassr	3–1	Al-Taawoun	Riyadh
20:45	Al-Amri (yellow card) 60'; Asiri (yellow card) 85'; Aboubakar 90+1'; Hamdallah 90+8' (pen.), 90+14', (yellow card) 90+10'; Al-Hassan (yellow card) 90+12'	Report	Amissi (yellow card) 18'; Al-Nabit (yellow card) 32' (yellow-red card) 77'; Kaku 88' (pen.)	Stadium: Mrsool Park; Attendance: 8,847; Referee: Andrés Matonte (Uruguay)

18 September 2021 5	Al-Nassr	1–3	Al-Ittihad	Riyadh
20:30	Al-Amri (yellow card) 14' (yellow-red card) 88'; S. Al-Ghanam 37'	Report	Al-Aboud 11'; Al-Malki (yellow card) 48'; Coronado 64'; Grohe (yellow card) 69'; Abdulhamid (yellow card) 72'; Al-Shamrani (yellow card) 80'; Henrique 89'	Stadium: Mrsool Park; Attendance: 14,619; Referee: Sandro Schärer (Switzerland)

23 September 2021 6	Al-Nassr	1–0	Al-Batin	Riyadh
18:25	Madu (yellow card) 8'; Abdullah (yellow card) 16'; Talisca 34'; S. Al-Ghanam (yellow card) 90'	Report	Al-Rubaie (yellow card) 74'; Abreu (yellow card) 90+1'	Stadium: Mrsool Park; Attendance: 4,672; Referee: Ovidiu Hațegan (Romania)

30 September 2021 7	Abha	1–3	Al-Nassr	Abha
18:35	Al-Amri (yellow card) 17' (yellow-red card) 63'; Atouchi (yellow card) 72' (yellow-red card) 90+6', (goal) 75'	Report	Talisca 18', 39', (yellow card) 56'; Lajami (yellow card) 49'; Al-Hassan (yellow card) 67'; Al-Khaibari (yellow card) 74'; Aboubakar 89'	Stadium: Prince Sultan bin Abdul Aziz Stadium; Attendance: 6,203; Referee: Faisal Al-Blwi

24 October 2021 9	Al-Nassr	0–1	Al-Ettifaq	Riyadh
18:00	Al-Najei (yellow card) 36'; Al-Amri (yellow card) 38'; S. Al-Ghanam (yellow card) 45+1'; Hamdallah (yellow card) 48'; Talisca (yellow card) 86'	Report	Kiss (yellow card) 64', (goal) 75' (pen.); Al-Rubaie (yellow card) 68'; M'Bolhi (yellow card) 88'	Stadium: Mrsool Park; Attendance: 16,458; Referee: István Kovács (Romania)

30 October 2021 10	Al-Fayha	1–1	Al-Nassr	Al Majma'ah
19:50	Moutari (yellow card) 21'; Al-Safri (yellow card) 27'; Al-Abdulmenem 84'	Report	Al-Najei 17'; Asiri (yellow card) 53'	Stadium: Al Majma'ah Sports City; Attendance: 6,136; Referee: Piero Maza (Chile)

5 November 2021 11	Al-Shabab	1–0	Al-Nassr	Riyadh
17:50	Bahebri (yellow card) 12', (goal) 23'; Paulinho (yellow card) 26'	Report	Qassem (yellow card) 21'; Al-Amri (yellow card) 67'; Funes Mori (yellow card) 90+3'	Stadium: Prince Faisal bin Fahd Stadium; Attendance: 8,092; Referee: Mario Díaz de Vivar (Paraguay)

20 November 2021 12	Al-Nassr	2–2	Al-Raed	Riyadh
19:40	Talisca 24'; Lajami 45+1'	Report	El Berkaoui 5'; Eder 38'	Stadium: Mrsool Park; Attendance: 3,630; Referee: Bastian Dankert (Germany)

26 November 2021 13	Al-Ahli	1–2	Al-Nassr	Jeddah
19:40	Al-Khabrani (yellow card) 10'; Ndao (yellow card) 33'; Alioski (yellow card) 65', (goal) 84'; Al-Asmari (yellow card) 67'	Report	Yahya (yellow card) 19'; Talisca (yellow card) 44', (goal) 53', 76'; Al-Shammari (yellow card) 82'	Stadium: King Abdullah Sports City; Attendance: 18,419; Referee: Vítor Ferreira (Portugal)

10 December 2021 4	Al-Tai	2–1	Al-Nassr	Ha'il
15:25	Majrashi (yellow card) 24'; Malele 52'; Musona (yellow card) 69'; Al-Qahtani (yellow card) 84'; Dener 90+2'; Al-Johani (yellow card) 90+5'	Report	K. Al-Ghannam (yellow card) 38'; Aboubakar 45+3'	Stadium: Prince Abdul Aziz bin Musa'ed Stadium; Attendance: 7,697; Referee: Nawaf Shukralla (Bahrain)

16 December 2021 8	Al-Hilal	0–2	Al-Nassr	Riyadh
15:15	Gomis (yellow card) 27'; Al-Faraj (yellow card) 43'; Pereira (yellow card) 45+3'	Report	Yahya (yellow card) 34'; Aboubakar 39'; Al-Shammari (yellow card) 49'; Al-Hassan (yellow card) 54'; Talisca 90', (yellow card) 90+2'	Stadium: King Fahd International Stadium; Attendance: 24,175; Referee: Paolo Valeri (Italy)

26 December 2021 14	Al-Nassr	2–1	Al-Hazem	Riyadh
17:50	K. Al-Ghannam 14'; Al-Hassan (yellow card) 36'; Aboubakar 52'; Al-Khaibari (yellow card) 81'; Masharipov (yellow card) 88'	Report	Alison (yellow card) 45+2'; Zidan (yellow card) 51'; Rodrigues 57'; Al-Dakheel (yellow card) 80'; Al-Juwaid (yellow card) 87'	Stadium: Mrsool Park; Attendance: 5,277; Referee: Ivan Kružliak (Slovakia)

1 January 2022 15	Al-Fateh	0–1	Al-Nassr	Al-Hasa
17:40	Saâdane (red card) 42'; Al-Hassan (yellow card) 50'; Al-Zaqaan (yellow card) 72'	Report	Yahya (yellow card) 24'; Anselmo (yellow card) 64'; Talisca 75'	Stadium: Prince Abdullah bin Jalawi Stadium; Attendance: 5,964; Referee: Ovidiu Hațegan (Romania)

8 January 2022 16	Damac	0–2	Al-Nassr	Abha
15:50	Soudani (yellow card) 53'; Augusto (yellow card) 71'; Al-Enezi (yellow card) 90+3'	Report	Al-Hassan (yellow card) 12'; Talisca 19'; Martínez 51'; Al-Khaibari (yellow card) 65'; S. Al-Ghanam (yellow card) 75'; Al-Shammari (yellow card) 80'	Stadium: Prince Sultan bin Abdul Aziz Stadium; Attendance: 6,732; Referee: Fábio Veríssimo (Portugal)

15 January 2022 17	Al-Nassr	4–0	Al-Faisaly	Riyadh
18:05	K. Al-Ghannam 2'; Talisca 74'; Martínez 78', 80'	Report	Al-Saiari (yellow card) 31'; Silva (yellow card) 53'; Amalfitano (yellow card) 64'; Al-Amri (yellow card) 75'	Stadium: Mrsool Park; Attendance: 6,811; Referee: Sandro Schärer (Switzerland)

21 January 2022 18	Al-Taawoun	0–1	Al-Nassr	Buraidah
15:40	Al-Oyayari (yellow card) 60'; Amissi (yellow card) 83'	Report	Martínez (yellow card) 4'; Anselmo (yellow card) 52'; Al-Saluli 80' (o.g.)	Stadium: King Abdullah Sport City Stadium; Attendance: 9,780; Referee: Bráulio Machado (Brazil)

6 February 2022 19	Al-Nassr	4–1	Al-Tai	Riyadh
18:20	Talisca 6', 26'; Lajami (yellow card) 16'; Martínez 19' (pen.); Rodríguez 79'	Report	Al-Zubaidi (yellow card) 48'; Fallatah (yellow card) 50'; Al-Jubairi 59'	Stadium: Mrsool Park; Attendance: 7,693; Referee: Artur Soares Dias (Portugal)

11 February 2022 20	Al-Ittihad	3–0	Al-Nassr	Jeddah
20:20	Romarinho 6' (pen.), (yellow card) 61'; Al-Bishi 31'; Al-Muwallad (yellow card) 48'; Hamdallah 68'; Al-Shanqeeti (yellow card) 82'; Al-Nashri (yellow card) 83'	Report	Talisca (red card) 59'	Stadium: King Abdullah Sports City; Attendance: 0 Referee: Jesús Gil Manzano (Spain)

17 February 2022 21	Al-Batin	3–4	Al-Nassr	Hafar al-Batin
15:45	Naji (yellow card) 20'; Abreu 33' (pen.), 79' (pen.); Sami (yellow card) 67', (goal) 81'; Al-Eisa (yellow card) 70'	Report	Aboubakar 4'; Al-Sulaiheem 24'; K. Al-Ghannam (yellow card) 45', (goal) 68'; Al-Khaibari (yellow card) 78'; Martínez 90+1' (pen.)	Stadium: Al-Batin Club Stadium; Attendance: 2,300; Referee: César Ramos (Mexico)

26 February 2022 22	Al-Nassr	2–1	Abha	Riyadh
18:25	Ifa 37' (o.g.); Funes Mori (yellow card) 72'; Aboubakar 90+7'	Report	Matić (yellow card) 7', (goal) 69'; Meziani (yellow card) 13'; Al-Barakah (yellow card) 58'; Atouchi (yellow card) 67'; Al-Qaydhi (yellow card) 90+5'; Al-Shammeri (yellow card) 90+6'	Stadium: Mrsool Park; Attendance: 6,983; Referee: Sami Al-Jires

3 March 2022 23	Al-Nassr	0–4	Al-Hilal	Riyadh
21:00	Martínez (yellow card) 45+2'; Talisca (yellow card) 51'; Funes Mori (red card) 63'	Report	Pereira 16'; S. Al-Dawsari 34', 45+2', (yellow card) 47'; Al-Bulaihi (yellow card) 41'; Cuéllar (yellow card) 52'; Ighalo 75'; Kanno (yellow card) 83'	Stadium: Mrsool Park; Attendance: 11,913; Referee: Sergei Karasev (Russia)

11 March 2022 24	Al-Ettifaq	2–2	Al-Nassr	Dammam
20:45	Al-Kuwaykibi (yellow card) 20', (goal) 28'; Quaison 35', (yellow card) 39' (yellow-red card) 90+3'; Ghazi (yellow card) 42' (yellow-red card) 85'; Hawsawi (red card) 45+2'; Al-Rubaie (yellow card) 77'	Report	Masharipov (yellow card) 34'; Anselmo (yellow card) 41'; Al-Khateeb 51' (o.g.); Martínez 62'; Lajami (yellow card) 90+2'; Al-Amri (yellow card) 90+2'	Stadium: Prince Mohamed bin Fahd Stadium; Attendance: 11,379; Referee: Majed Al-Shamrani

17 March 2022 25	Al-Nassr	1–0	Al-Fayha	Riyadh
20:50	Masharipov 74', (yellow card) 85'; Qassem (yellow card) 90+9'	Report	Bamsaud (yellow card) 25'; Abousaban (red card) 44'; Al-Abdulmenem (yellow card) 81'; Tachtsidis (yellow card) 90+8'	Stadium: Mrsool Park; Attendance: 0 Referee: Raed Al-Zahrani

6 May 2022 26	Al-Nassr	4–2	Al-Shabab	Riyadh
20:50	Al-Amri 18'; Talisca 31' (pen.), 50'; Al-Sulaiheem 34'; K. Al-Ghannam (yellow card) 51'	Report	N'Diaye (yellow card) 10'; Al-Qarni (yellow card) 28'; Carlos (yellow card) 45+3', (goal) 80'; Al-Ammar 55'; Banega (yellow card) 69'; Santos (yellow card) 72'	Stadium: Mrsool Park; Attendance: 7,709; Referee: Mohammed Al-Hoaish

21 May 2022 27	Al-Raed	0–3	Al-Nassr	Buraidah
21:00		Report	S. Al-Ghanam 8'; Al-Najei (yellow card) 66'; Talisca 75', (yellow card) 86'; Martínez 89'	Stadium: King Abdullah Sport City Stadium; Attendance: 16,168; Referee: Mohammed Al-Esmaiel

28 May 2022 28	Al-Nassr	1–1	Al-Ahli	Riyadh
19:20	Al-Shammari (yellow card) 54'; Anselmo (yellow card) 58'; Talisca 90+5'	Report	Al-Majhad (yellow card) 36'; Bradarić (yellow card) 62'; Ghareeb 64'; Eduardo (yellow card) 72'	Stadium: Mrsool Park; Attendance: 12,337; Referee: Faisal Al-Blwi

23 June 2022 29	Al-Hazem	1–4	Al-Nassr	Ar Rass
21:00	Neris (yellow card) 55'; Al-Obaid (yellow card) 56'; John 69' (pen.); Stojanović (yellow card) 71'; Abdullah S. (yellow card) 82'	Report	Al-Amri 12'; Martínez (yellow card) 53'; Talisca 60', 90+3'; Al-Najei 84'	Stadium: Al-Hazem Club Stadium; Attendance: 3,940; Referee: Mohammed Al-Hoaish

27 June 2022 30	Al-Nassr	2–1	Al-Fateh	Riyadh
21:00	Martínez 13'; Anselmo (yellow card) 59'; Talisca (red card) 73'; Masharipov 90+5' (pen.)	Report	Al-Fuhaid (yellow card) 30'; Al-Khulaif 37', (yellow card) 45'; Al-Jari (yellow card) 56'; Al-Dawsari (yellow card) 90+3'	Stadium: Mrsool Park; Attendance: 2,364; Referee: Sami Al-Jires

=== King Cup ===
All times are local, AST (UTC+3).

21 December 2021 Round of 16	Al-Nassr	1–0	Al-Ettifaq	Riyadh
17:50	Yahya (yellow card) 33'; Al-Amri (yellow card) 43'; K. Al-Ghannam 50'; Anselmo (yellow card) 81'; Al-Shammari (yellow card) 90+1'	Report	Al-Rubaie (yellow card) 19' (yellow-red card) 27'; Al-Mowalad (yellow card) 45+2'	Stadium: Mrsool Park; Referee: Szymon Marciniak (Poland)

21 February 2022 Quarter-finals	Al-Nassr	1–2	Al-Hilal	Riyadh
18:25	Talisca 17'; Martínez (yellow card) 23'; Rodríguez (yellow card) 44'; Aboubakar (yellow card) 76'; Al-Shammari (yellow card) 90+5'	Report	Al-Shahrani (yellow card) 25'; Al-Dawsari (yellow card) 43', (goal) 80' (pen.); Al-Bulaihi (yellow card) 49'; Ighalo 62'; Marega (yellow card) 81'	Stadium: Mrsool Park; Referee: Mustapha Ghorbal (Algeria)

=== AFC Champions League ===
==== Knockout phase ====
14 September 2021 Round of 16	Al-Nassr (Saudi Arabia)	1–0	(Iran) Tractor	Doha, Qatar
19:00 UTC+3	Asiri (yellow card) 5'; Aboubakar 11'; Qassem (yellow card) 76'	Live Report; Stats Report	Razzaghpour (yellow card) 31'; Imani (yellow card) 67'	Stadium: Jassim bin Hamad Stadium; Attendance: 0 Referee: Kim Dae-yong (South Korea)

16 October 2021 Quarter-finals	Al Wahda (United Arab Emirates)	1–5	(Saudi Arabia) Al-Nassr	Riyadh, Saudi Arabia
18:00 UTC+3	Pedro (yellow card) 45+3'; Matar 90+3'	Live Report; Stats Report	Hamdallah 7'; Qassem (yellow card) 32'; Talisca (yellow card) 44'; Masharipov 52', 65'; Asiri 56'; Al-Najei 75', (yellow card) 86'; Al-Khaibari (yellow card) 90+1'	Stadium: Mrsool Park; Attendance: 20,477; Referee: Ma Ning (China)

19 October 2021 Semi-finals	Al-Nassr (Saudi Arabia)	1–2	(Saudi Arabia) Al-Hilal	Riyadh, Saudi Arabia
21:00 UTC+3	Lajami (red card) 45+2'; Talisca 50'; Al-Ghanam (yellow card) 75'; Al-Amri (yellow card) 85'	Live Report	Marega 17'; Hyun-soo (yellow card) 21'; Al-Bulaihi (yellow card) 63'; S. Al-Dawsari 71'	Stadium: Mrsool Park; Attendance: 23,985; Referee: Chris Beath

== Statistics ==
=== Appearances ===
Last updated on 27 June 2022.

No.	Pos	Nat	Player	Total		Pro League		King Cup		Champions League	
No.	Pos	Nat	Player	Apps	Goals	Apps	Goals	Apps	Goals	Apps	Goals
Goalkeepers
1	GK	(Saudi Arabia) KSA	Amin Bukhari	10	0	8+2	0	0	0	0	0
33	GK	(Saudi Arabia) KSA	Waleed Abdullah	25	0	19+1	0	2	0	3	0
57	GK	(Saudi Arabia) KSA	Raed Ozaybi	0	0	0	0	0	0	0	0
Defenders
2	DF	(Saudi Arabia) KSA	Sultan Al-Ghanam	30	2	24+1	2	2	0	3	0
3	DF	(Saudi Arabia) KSA	Abdullah Madu	9	0	5+2	0	0	0	2	0
4	DF	(Saudi Arabia) KSA	Mohammed Al-Fatil	5	0	4	0	0	0	1	0
5	DF	(Saudi Arabia) KSA	Abdulelah Al-Amri	24	2	19	2	2	0	3	0
15	DF	(Saudi Arabia) KSA	Abdulaziz Al-Faraj	1	0	1	0	0	0	0	0
18	DF	(Saudi Arabia) KSA	Mohammed Qassem	11	0	7+2	0	0	0	2	0
20	DF	(Saudi Arabia) KSA	Hamad Al Mansour	9	0	5+4	0	0	0	0	0
30	DF	(Saudi Arabia) KSA	Abdulkareem Al-Muziel	0	0	0	0	0	0	0	0
31	DF	(Saudi Arabia) KSA	Dhari Al-Anazi	0	0	0	0	0	0	0	0
42	DF	(Saudi Arabia) KSA	Mansour Al-Shammari	25	0	19+4	0	2	0	0	0
55	DF	(Argentina) ARG	Ramiro Funes Mori	23	0	17+4	0	2	0	0	0
59	DF	(Saudi Arabia) KSA	Yousef Haqawi	0	0	0	0	0	0	0	0
78	DF	(Saudi Arabia) KSA	Ali Lajami	21	1	18+2	1	0	0	1	0
Midfielders
7	MF	(Uzbekistan) UZB	Jaloliddin Masharipov	29	4	17+9	2	0	0	3	2
8	MF	(Saudi Arabia) KSA	Abdulmajeed Al-Sulayhem	20	2	14+4	2	0	0	2	0
10	MF	(Argentina) ARG	Pity Martínez	20	8	8+10	8	1+1	0	0	0
11	MF	(Saudi Arabia) KSA	Khalid Al-Ghannam	28	4	17+8	3	1+1	1	0+1	0
14	MF	(Saudi Arabia) KSA	Sami Al-Najei	25	3	11+10	2	0+1	0	0+3	1
17	MF	(Saudi Arabia) KSA	Abdullah Al-Khaibari	28	0	18+5	0	1+1	0	3	0
19	MF	(Saudi Arabia) KSA	Ali Al-Hassan	26	0	12+9	0	2	0	1+2	0
28	MF	(Saudi Arabia) KSA	Ibrahim Al-Mahdawi	0	0	0	0	0	0	0	0
45	MF	(Saudi Arabia) KSA	Abdulfattah Asiri	18	1	4+11	0	0	0	3	1
87	MF	(Brazil) BRA	Anselmo	22	0	13+7	0	1+1	0	0	0
94	MF	(Brazil) BRA	Talisca	33	22	28	20	2	1	3	1
Forwards
12	FW	(Saudi Arabia) KSA	Meshari Al-Nemer	1	0	0+1	0	0	0	0	0
22	FW	(Uruguay) URU	Jonathan Rodríguez	9	1	4+4	1	1	0	0	0
26	FW	(Cameroon) CMR	Vincent Aboubakar	27	9	19+4	8	1	0	1+2	1
29	FW	(Saudi Arabia) KSA	Abdulfattah Adam	5	0	3+1	0	1	0	0	0
Players sent out on loan this season
21	MF	(Saudi Arabia) KSA	Mukhtar Ali	1	0	0	0	0	0	0+1	0
23	MF	(Saudi Arabia) KSA	Ayman Yahya	13	0	4+6	0	1	0	0+2	0
44	GK	(Saudi Arabia) KSA	Nawaf Al-Aqidi	3	0	3	0	0	0	0	0
52	FW	(Saudi Arabia) KSA	Khalil Al-Absi	1	0	1	0	0	0	0	0
Player who made an appearance this season but have left the club
6	MF	(Brazil) BRA	Petros	3	0	3	0	0	0	0	0
9	FW	(Morocco) MAR	Abderrazak Hamdallah	8	4	4+2	3	0	0	2	1
13	DF	(Saudi Arabia) KSA	Abdulrahman Al-Obaid	4	0	1+1	0	0	0	0+2	0
37	DF	(Saudi Arabia) KSA	Naif Almas	0	0	0	0	0	0	0	0

=== Goalscorers ===
Rank	No.	Pos	Nat	Name	Pro League	King Cup	Champions League	Total
1	94	MF	(Brazil)	Talisca	20	1	1	22
2	26	FW	(Cameroon)	Vincent Aboubakar	8	0	1	9
3	10	MF	(Argentina)	Pity Martínez	8	0	0	8
4	7	MF	(Uzbekistan)	Jaloliddin Masharipov	2	0	2	4
4	9	FW	(Morocco)	Abderrazak Hamdallah	3	0	1	4
4	11	MF	(Saudi Arabia)	Khalid Al-Ghannam	3	1	0	4
7	14	MF	(Saudi Arabia)	Sami Al-Najei	2	0	1	3
8	2	DF	(Saudi Arabia)	Sultan Al-Ghanam	2	0	0	2
8	5	DF	(Saudi Arabia)	Abdulelah Al-Amri	2	0	0	2
8	8	MF	(Saudi Arabia)	Abdulmajeed Al-Sulayhem	2	0	0	2
11	22	FW	(Uruguay)	Jonathan Rodríguez	1	0	0	1
11	45	MF	(Saudi Arabia)	Abdulfattah Asiri	0	0	1	1
11	78	DF	(Saudi Arabia)	Ali Lajami	1	0	0	1
Own goal					4	0	0	4
Total					58	2	7	67

Last Updated: 27 June 2022

=== Assists ===
Rank	No.	Pos	Nat	Name	Pro League	King Cup	Champions League	Total
1	7	MF	(Uzbekistan)	Jaloliddin Masharipov	5	0	1	6
2	26	FW	(Cameroon)	Vincent Aboubakar	4	1	0	5
2	45	MF	(Saudi Arabia)	Abdulfattah Asiri	4	0	1	5
4	14	MF	(Saudi Arabia)	Sami Al-Najei	4	0	0	4
4	94	MF	(Brazil)	Talisca	2	0	2	4
6	2	DF	(Saudi Arabia)	Sultan Al-Ghanam	3	0	0	3
6	11	MF	(Saudi Arabia)	Khalid Al-Ghannam	3	0	0	3
8	10	MF	(Argentina)	Pity Martínez	2	0	0	2
8	17	MF	(Saudi Arabia)	Abdullah Al-Khaibari	1	1	0	2
8	42	DF	(Saudi Arabia)	Mansour Al-Shammari	2	0	0	2
11	9	FW	(Morocco)	Abderrazak Hamdallah	0	0	1	1
11	23	MF	(Saudi Arabia)	Ayman Yahya	0	0	1	1
11	29	FW	(Saudi Arabia)	Abdulfattah Adam	1	0	0	1
11	78	DF	(Saudi Arabia)	Ali Lajami	1	0	0	1
Total					32	2	6	40

Last Updated: 23 June 2022

=== Clean sheets ===
Rank	No.	Pos	Nat	Name	Pro League	King Cup	Champions League	Total
1	33	GK	(Saudi Arabia)	Waleed Abdullah	6	1	1	8
2	1	GK	(Saudi Arabia)	Amin Bukhari	3	0	0	3
Total					8	1	1	10

Last Updated: 21 May 2022
