= Abdulrahman Al-Obaid =

Saudi Arabian footballer (born 1993)

Personal information
- Full name: Abdulrahman Ahmed Abdullah Al-Obaid
- Date of birth: 30 April 1993 (age 33)
- Place of birth: Khobar, Saudi Arabia
- Height: 1.71 m (5 ft 7 in)
- Position: Left-back

Team information
- Current team: Damac
- Number: 13

Youth career
- Al-Qadsiah

Senior career*
Years	Team	Apps	(Gls)
2013–2018	Al-Qadsiah	114	(4)
2018–2022	Al-Nassr	62	(1)
2022–2023	Al-Hilal	1	(0)
2022–2023	→ Al-Ettifaq (loan)	9	(0)
2023–	Damac	0	(0)

International career^{‡}
2014–2016	Saudi Arabia U23		
2016–	Saudi Arabia	6	(0)
- * Club domestic league appearances and goals as of 20:04, 18 May 2023 (UTC) ‡ National team caps and goals as of 20:21, 19 November 2019 (UTC)

Abdulrahman Ahmed Abdullah Al-Obaid (Arabic: عبد الرحمن أحمد عبد الله العبيد, born 30 April 1993) is a Saudi Arabian professional footballer who plays as a left-back for Damac.

== Career ==
On 9 January 2022, Al-Obaid joined Al-Hilal on a three-year deal. On 8 July 2022, he joined Al-Ettifaq on a one-year loan. On 8 September 2023, he joined Damac.

== Career statistics ==
=== Club ===
As of match played 27 May 2024

Appearances and goals by club, season and competition
Club	Season	League			King Cup		Crown Prince Cup		Asia		Other		Total	
Club	Season	Division	Apps	Goals	Apps	Goals	Apps	Goals	Apps	Goals	Apps	Goals	Apps	Goals
Al-Qadsiah	2013–14	First Division	20	0	0	0	0	0	—		—		20	0
Al-Qadsiah	2014–15	First Division	30	1	2	0	2	0	—		—		34	1
Al-Qadsiah	2015–16	Pro League	26	1	1	0	2	1	—		—		29	2
Al-Qadsiah	2016–17	Pro League	25	1	2	0	0	0	—		—		27	1
Al-Qadsiah	2017–18	Pro League	13	1	1	0	0	0	—		—		14	1
Al-Qadsiah	Total		114	4	6	0	4	1	0	0	0	0	124	5
Al-Nassr	2017–18	Pro League	7	0	1	0	—		—		—		8	0
Al-Nassr	2018–19	Pro League	11	0	3	0	—		8	0	0	0	22	0
Al-Nassr	2019–20	Pro League	22	0	1	0	—		5	1	0	0	28	1
Al-Nassr	2020–21	Pro League	20	1	2	0	—		3	0	0	0	25	1
Al-Nassr	2021–22	Pro League	2	0	0	0	—		0	0	0	0	2	0
Al-Nassr	Total		62	1	7	0	0	0	16	1	0	0	85	2
Al-Hilal	2021–22	Pro League	1	0	0	0	—		3	0	0	0	4	0
Al-Ettifaq (loan)	2022–23	Pro League	9	0	1	0	—		—		—		10	0
Damac	2023–24	Pro League	9	0	0	0	—		—		—		9	0
Career total			195	5	14	0	4	1	19	1	0	0	232	7

=== International ===
Statistics accurate as of match played 19 November 2019.

Saudi Arabia
Year	Apps	Goals
2016	1	0
2017	4	0
2019	1	0
Total	6	0

== Honours ==
Al-Qadsiah

- First Division: 2014–15

Al-Nassr

- Pro League: 2018–19
- Saudi Super Cup: 2019, 2020

Al-Hilal

- Pro League: 2021–22
