= Nawaf Al-Aqidi =

Saudi Arabian footballer (born 2000)

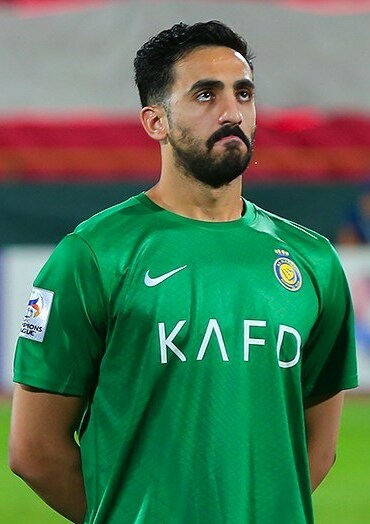
- Al-Aqidi with Al-Nassr in 2023

Personal information
- Full name: Nawaf Dhahi Faisal Al-Suwaiti Al-Aqidi
- Date of birth: 10 May 2000 (age 26)
- Place of birth: Riyadh, Saudi Arabia
- Height: 1.86 m (6 ft 1 in)
- Position: Goalkeeper

Team information
- Current team: Al-Nassr
- Number: 1

Youth career
- Al-Nassr

Senior career*
Years	Team	Apps	(Gls)
2020–	Al-Nassr	43	(0)
2022	→ Al-Tai (loan)	7	(0)
2025	→ Al-Fateh (loan)	16	(0)

International career^{‡}
2019–2021	Saudi Arabia U20		
2021–2022	Saudi Arabia U23	21	(0)
2023–	Saudi Arabia	25	(0)
Medal record
Men's football
Representing Saudi Arabia
AFC U-23 Asian Cup
Winner	2022 Uzbekistan
Islamic Solidarity Games
Runner-up	2021 Konya
WAFF U-23 Championship
Runner-up	2021 Saudi Arabia
- * Club domestic league appearances and goals as of 5 September 2026 ‡ National team caps and goals as of 23 September 2026

Nawaf Dhahi Faisal Al-Suwaiti Al-Aqidi (Arabic: نواف ضاحي فيصل الشويطي العقيدي; born 10 May 2000) is a Saudi Arabian professional footballer who plays as a goalkeeper for Saudi Pro League club Al-Nassr and the Saudi Arabia national team.

== Club career ==
Nawaf began his career for the youth team of Al-Nassr. On 30 June 2019, he was chosen in the Saudi program to develop football talents established by General Sports Authority.

He signed his first professional contract with Al-Nassr on 8 August 2019. He returned from the program due to family circumstances and was promoted to Al-Nassr's first-team on 31 December 2019.

On 11 January 2020, he was named on the bench for the first team the league match against Al-Ittihad. On 30 September 2021, Al-Aqidi made his debut for Al-Nassr in the league match against Abha.

On 30 January 2022, Al-Aqidi joined Al-Tai on loan. He made his debut on 12 February 2022, in the 3–1 win against Al-Batin. He made 7 appearances and kept 3 clean sheets for Al-Tai before returning to Al-Nassr at the end of the season. On 31 January 2025, Al-Aqidi joined Al-Fateh on a six-month loan.

== International career ==
=== Saudi Arabia U23 ===
He played for the Saudi Arabia U20 national team but was not part of the 2020 AFC U-19 Championship qualification, in which Saudi Arabia qualified with two wins and one draw. However, with the 2020 AFC U-19 Championship cancelled due to COVID-19 pandemic, he was able to redeem himself in the 2022 AFC U-23 Asian Cup with a spectacular performance, guiding the team to conquer the first title without conceding a single goal and a near perfect record with only Japan managed to hold Saudi Arabia a draw.

He was also summoned for the Islamic Solidarity Games in Konya, Turkey, which was delayed to 2022 due to the same reason. Al-Aqidi once again impressed in the tournament without conceding a single goal in the group stage until the semi-finals, when he finally conceded a goal after eight consecutive clean sheets, in Saudi Arabia's 2–1 win over Algeria, albeit it was from a penalty rather than an open play.

In the final, Al-Aqidi finally conceded the first ever open play goal after nine games, which was against the hosts Turkey in a pressuring attempt that saw Metehan Altunbaş netted, yet that goal proved disastrous as Saudi Arabia proved unable to break the Turkish defence as Saudi Arabia's hope to win the second major tournament in the same year crashed by this 0–1 loss.

=== Senior ===
On 18 November 2021, Al-Aqidi called up to the senior side for the first time to take part in the 2021 FIFA Arab Cup. He made no appearances in the competition, as Saudi Arabia exited at the group stage.

On 11 November 2022, Al-Aqidi was named in the squad for the 2022 FIFA World Cup. He didn't play a single game in the tournament as third choice keeper to Mohammed Al-Owais and Mohammed Al-Rubaie, as Saudi Arabia again crashed out of the group stage despite historic win over Argentina in the opener.

On 30 December 2022, Al-Aqidi was named in the squad for the 25th Arabian Gulf Cup. He started in all three matches, as Saudi Arabia again failed to progress from the group stage. However, under the coaching of Roberto Mancini, Al-Aqidi was excluded from the squad for the 2023 AFC Asian Cup.

On 31 May 2026, he was named in the 26-man squad for the 2026 FIFA World Cup.

== Career statistics ==
As of match played 5 September 2026

Appearances and goals by club, season and competition
Club	Season	League			National cup		Continental		Other		Total	
Club	Season	Division	Apps	Goals	Apps	Goals	Apps	Goals	Apps	Goals	Apps	Goals
Al-Nassr	2019–20	Saudi Pro League	0	0	0	0	0	0	0	0	0	0
Al-Nassr	2020–21	Saudi Pro League	0	0	0	0	0	0	0	0	0	0
Al-Nassr	2021–22	Saudi Pro League	3	0	0	0	—		—		3	0
Al-Nassr	2022–23	Saudi Pro League	11	0	2	0	—		0	0	13	0
Al-Nassr	2023–24	Saudi Pro League	16	0	3	0	6	0	0	0	25	0
Al-Nassr	2024–25	Saudi Pro League	0	0	0	0	0	0	0	0	0	0
Al-Nassr	2025–26	Saudi Pro League	11	0	0	0	1	0	0	0	12	0
Al-Nassr	2026–27	Saudi Pro League	2	0	0	0	1	0	—		3	0
Al-Nassr	Total		43	0	5	0	8	0	0	0	56	0
Al-Tai (loan)	2021–22	Saudi Pro League	7	0	—		—		—		7	0
Al-Fateh (loan)	2024–25	Saudi Pro League	16	0	—		—		—		16	0
Career total			66	0	5	0	8	0	0	0	79	0

== Honours ==
Al-Nassr

- Saudi Pro League: 2025–26
- Saudi Super Cup: 2020
- Arab Club Champions Cup: 2023

Saudi Arabia U23

- AFC U-23 Asian Cup: 2022
- WAFF U-23 Championship runner-up: 2021

Individual

- WAFF U-23 Championship Best Goalkeeper: 2021
- Saudi Pro League Young Player of the Month: May & June 2022
- AFC U-23 Asian Cup Best Goalkeeper: 2022
- Arab Club Champions Cup Best Goalkeeper: 2023
