= Khalid Al-Ghannam =

Saudi Arabian footballer (born 2000)

Personal information
- Full name: Khalid Eissa Al-Ghannam
- Date of birth: 8 November 2000 (age 26)
- Place of birth: Khobar, Saudi Arabia
- Height: 1.71 m (5 ft 7 in)
- Position: Winger

Team information
- Current team: Al-Ettifaq
- Number: 17

Youth career
- 2013-2019: Al-Qadsiah

Senior career*
Years	Team	Apps	(Gls)
2019–2020	Al-Qadsiah	15	(1)
2020–2024	Al-Nassr	77	(8)
2023	→ Al-Fateh (loan)	15	(3)
2024–	Al-Ettifaq	50	(15)
2024–2025	→ Al-Hilal (loan)	11	(0)

International career^{‡}
2017–2019	Saudi Arabia U20	22	(4)
2019–2022	Saudi Arabia U23		
2021–	Saudi Arabia	8	(0)
- * Club domestic league appearances and goals as of 20:08, 24 October 2026 (UTC) ‡ National team caps and goals as of 20:32, 21 June 2026 (UTC)

Khalid Eissa Al-Ghannam (Arabic: خالد الغنام; born 8 November 2000) is a Saudi Arabian professional footballer who plays as a winger for Saudi Pro League side Al-Ettifaq and the Saudi Arabia national team.

== Club Career ==
Al-Ghannam started his career at the youth teams of Al-Qadsiah at 13 in 2013. On 22 January 2019, Al-Ghannam signed his first professional contract with the club. On 19 April 2019, he made his first-team debut in a 2–0 loss against Al-Batin. On 19 August 2019, Al-Ghannam signed a contract extension with Al-Qadsiah, keeping him at the club until 2024. On 29 January 2020, Al-Ghannam left his boyhood club and signed a 5-year contract with Pro League champions Al-Nassr. The reported fee was SAR20 million, in addition to Faraj Al-Ghushayan joining Al-Qadsiah on loan. He made 16 appearances for Al-Qadsiah in all competitions and scored once against Al-Bukayriyah.

On 28 January 2023, Al-Ghannam joined Al-Fateh on a six-month loan.

On 30 January 2024, Al-Ghannam joined Al-Ettifaq on a four-and-a-half-year deal. On 2 September 2024, Al-Ghannam joined Al-Hilal on a one-year loan.

== International Career ==
On 31 May 2026, he was named in the 26-man squad for the 2026 FIFA World Cup.

== Career statistics ==
=== Club ===
As of 3 September 2024.

Club	Season	League			Cup		Continental		Other		Total	
Club	Season	Division	Apps	Goals	Apps	Goals	Apps	Goals	Apps	Goals	Apps	Goals
Al-Qadsiah	2018–19	Pro League	1	0	0	0	–		–		1	0
Al-Qadsiah	2019–20	MS League	14	1	1	0	–		–		15	1
Al-Qadsiah	Total		15	1	1	0	0	0	0	0	16	1
Al-Nassr	2019–20	Pro League	13	1	2	0	8	1	–		23	2
Al-Nassr	2020–21	Pro League	24	4	2	0	6	1	1 (Note: Appearance in Saudi Super Cup)	0	33	5
Al-Nassr	2021–22	Pro League	25	3	2	1	1	0	–		28	4
Al-Nassr	2022–23	Pro League	7	0	1	0	–		0	0	8	0
Al-Nassr	2023–24	Pro League	8	0	2	0	3	0	2 (Note: Appearance in Arab Club Champions Cup)	0	15	0
Al-Nassr	Total		77	8	9	1	18	2	3	0	107	11
Al-Fateh (loan)	2022–23	Pro League	15	3	1	0	–		–		16	3
Al-Ettifaq	2023–24	Pro League	6	0	0	0	–		–		6	0
Career total			113	12	11	1	18	2	3	0	145	15

== Honours ==
Al-Nassr

- Saudi Super Cup: 2020
- Arab Club Champions Cup: 2023

Saudi Arabia U20

- AFC U-19 Championship: 2018
