= Hamad Al Mansour =

Saudi Arabian footballer (born 1993)

Personal information
- Full name: Hamad Fares Al Mansour
- Date of birth: August 19, 1993 (age 33)
- Place of birth: Najran, Saudi Arabia
- Height: 1.72 m (5 ft 8 in)
- Positions: Full-back; winger

Senior career*
Years	Team	Apps	(Gls)
2014–2017	Najran	27	(7)
2016	→ Al-Hazem (loan)	11	(3)
2017–2018	Al-Faisaly	19	(1)
2018–2025	Al Nassr	24	(1)
2020–2021	→ Al-Ittihad (loan)	11	(0)
2023–2024	→ Al-Okhdood (loan)	20	(1)
- * Club domestic league appearances and goals as of 16 February 2024

Hamad Fares Al Mansour (Arabic: حَمَد فَارِس آل مَنْصُور; born August 19, 1993) is a Saudi Arabian professional footballer who plays as a winger and full-back.

== Club career ==
Al Mansour started his journey working his way through the ranks of Najran. He made his professional debut for Najran on 3 January 2014. He was sent out on loan to Al-Hazem on 19 January 2016.

On 11 June 2017, Al Mansour left Najran and joined Pro League side Al-Faisaly. He helped the club reach the final of the King Cup for the first time in their history.

On 11 March 2018, Al Mansour signed a pre-contract agreement with Al-Nassr. He officially joined the club at the conclusion of the 2017–18 season. On 22 October 2020, Al Mansour joined Al-Ittihad on loan. On 29 January 2022, Al Mansour renewed his contract with Al-Nassr. On 29 June 2023, Al Mansour joined Al-Okhdood on loan.

== Style of play ==
Al Mansour usually plays as a left sided midfielder or a left back but he can also play as a centre and right midfielder. He has good control over the ball and plays with both feet. He usually takes long shots when he can and has good accuracy.

== Career statistics ==
As of 31 May 2024

Appearances and goals by club, season and competition
Club	Season	League			National Cup		League Cup		Asia		Other		Total	
Club	Season	Division	Apps	Goals	Apps	Goals	Apps	Goals	Apps	Goals	Apps	Goals	Apps	Goals
Najran	2013–14	Pro League	1	0	0	0	0	0	—		—		1	0
Najran	2014–15	Pro League	0	0	0	0	0	0	—		—		0	0
Najran	2015–16	Pro League	0	0	0	0	0	0	—		—		0	0
Najran	2016–17	First Division	26	7	1	0	2	2	—		2 (Note: Appearances in Pro League relegation play-offs)	1	31	10
Najran	Najran Total		27	7	1	0	2	2	0	0	2	1	32	10
Al-Hazem (loan)	2015–16	First Division	11	3	1	0	0	0	—		—		12	3
Al-Faisaly	2017–18	Pro League	19	1	5	1	0	0	—		—		24	2
Al-Nassr	2018–19	Pro League	11	1	4	0	—		8	0	2 (Note: Appearances in the Arab Club Champions Cup)	0	25	1
Al-Nassr	2019–20	Pro League	4	0	3	1	—		0	0	—		7	1
Al-Nassr	2021–22	Pro League	9	0	0	0	—		0	0	—		9	0
Al-Nassr	2022–23	Pro League	0	0	0	0	—		—		0	0	0	0
Al-Nassr	Al-Nassr Total		24	1	7	1	0	0	8	0	2	0	41	2
Al-Ittihad (loan)	2020–21	Pro League	11	0	2	0	—		—		0	0	13	0
Al-Okhdood (loan)	2023–24	Pro League	20	1	1	0	—		—		—		21	1
Career total			112	13	17	2	2	2	8	0	4	1	142	18

== Honours ==
Al-Nassr

- Saudi Professional League: 2018–19
- Saudi Super Cup: 2019
