= Abdullah Madu =

Saudi Arabian footballer (born 1993)

Personal information
- Full name: Abdullah Mohammed Musa Madu
- Date of birth: 15 July 1993 (age 33)
- Place of birth: Mecca, Saudi Arabia
- Height: 1.87 m (6 ft 2 in)
- Position: Defender

Team information
- Current team: Al-Ettifaq
- Number: 3

Youth career
- -2007: Al-Mujazzal
- 2007-2012: Al-Nassr

Senior career*
Years	Team	Apps	(Gls)
2012–2024	Al-Nassr	91	(2)
2024	→ Al-Ettifaq (loan)	12	(0)
2024–	Al-Ettifaq	34	(1)

International career^{‡}
2014–2016	Saudi Arabia U23	8	(0)
2019–	Saudi Arabia	20	(0)
- * Club domestic league appearances and goals as of 22:25 8 September 2026 (UTC) ‡ National team caps and goals as of 08:09 29 June 2025 (UTC)

Abdullah Mohammed Musa Madu (Arabic: عبد الله محمد موسى مادو; born 15 July 1993) is a Saudi Arabian professional footballer who plays as a defender for Saudi Pro League club Al-Ettifaq and the Saudi Arabia national team.

== Career statistics ==
=== Club ===
As of 27 May 2024

Club	Season	League			King Cup		Crown Prince Cup		Asia		Other		Total	
Club	Season	Division	Apps	Goals	Apps	Goals	Apps	Goals	Apps	Goals	Apps	Goals	Apps	Goals
Al-Nassr	2012–13	Saudi Pro League	3	0	1	0	0	0	—		0	0	4	0
Al-Nassr	2013–14	Saudi Pro League	1	0	0	0	0	0	—		—		1	0
Al-Nassr	2014–15	Saudi Pro League	0	0	0	0	0	0	1	0	0	0	2	0
Al-Nassr	2015–16	Saudi Pro League	5	0	1	0	1	0	0	0	0	0	7	0
Al-Nassr	2016–17	Saudi Pro League	10	1	3	0	2	0	—		—		15	1
Al-Nassr	2017–18	Saudi Pro League	8	0	1	0	—		—		2 (Note: Appearances in Arab Club Champions Cup)	0	11	0
Al-Nassr	2018–19	Saudi Pro League	5	0	1	0	—		8 (Note: Appearances in AFC Champions League)	0	0	0	14	0
Al-Nassr	2019–20	Saudi Pro League	17	0	3	0	—		6	1	1 (Note: Appearance in Saudi Super Cup)	0	27	1
Al-Nassr	2020–21	Saudi Pro League	19	0	3	0	—		7	0	1	0	30	0
Al-Nassr	2021–22	Saudi Pro League	7	0	0	0	—		—		—		7	0
Al-Nassr	2022–23	Saudi Pro League	15	1	0	0	—		—		1	0	16	1
Al-Nassr	2023–24	Saudi Pro League	1	0	0	0	—		2	0	5	0	8	0
Al-Nassr	Club Total		91	2	13	0	3	0	24	1	10	0	141	3
Al-Ettifaq (loan)	2023–24	Saudi Pro League	12	0	0	0	—		—		—		12	0
Career Total			103	2	13	0	3	0	24	1	10	0	153	3

== Honours ==
Al-Nassr

- Saudi Pro League: 2013–14, 2014–15, 2018–19
- Crown Prince's Cup: 2013–14
- Saudi Super Cup: 2019, 2020
- Arab Club Champions Cup: 2023
