= Abdullah Al-Khaibari =

Saudi Arabian footballer

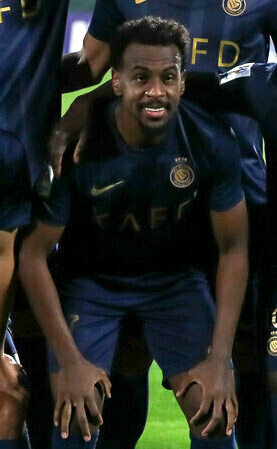
- Al-Khaibari with Al-Nassr in 2023

Personal information
- Full name: Abdullah Mohammed Al-Khaibari
- Date of birth: 16 August 1996 (age 30)
- Place of birth: Riyadh, Saudi Arabia
- Height: 1.75 m (5 ft 9 in)
- Position: Defensive midfielder

Team information
- Current team: Al-Nassr
- Number: 17

Youth career
- 2008-2017: Al-Shabab

Senior career*
Years	Team	Apps	(Gls)
2017–2019	Al-Shabab	32	(0)
2019–	Al-Nassr	187	(1)

International career^{‡}
2017–2018	Saudi Arabia U-23		
2018–	Saudi Arabia	49	(0)
- * Club domestic league appearances and goals as of 20 November 2026 ‡ National team caps and goals as of 17 November 2026

Abdullah Mohammed Al-Khaibari (Arabic: عبد الله محمد الخيبري, born 16 August 1996) is a Saudi Arabian professional footballer who plays as a defensive midfielder for Saudi Pro League club Al-Nassr and the Saudi Arabia national team.

== International Career ==
In May 2018, he was named in Saudi Arabia's preliminary squad for the 2018 World Cup in Russia.

On 31 May 2026, he was named in the 26-man squad for the 2026 FIFA World Cup.

== Career statistics ==
=== Club ===
As of 31 May 2024

Appearances and goals by club, season and competition
Club	Season	League			King Cup		Asia		Other		Total	
Club	Season	Division	Apps	Goals	Apps	Goals	Apps	Goals	Apps	Goals	Apps	Goals
Al-Shabab	2016–17	SPL	4	0	0	0	—		—		4	0
Al-Shabab	2017–18	SPL	16	0	1	0	—		—		17	0
Al-Shabab	2018–19	SPL	12	0	0	0	—		—		12	0
Al-Shabab	Al-Shabab Total		32	0	1	0	0	0	0	0	33	0
Al-Nassr	2018–19	SPL	8	0	1	0	4	0	0	0	13	0
Al-Nassr	2019–20	SPL	18	0	3	0	10	0	1 (Note: Appearance(s) in Saudi Super Cup)	0	32	0
Al-Nassr	2020–21	SPL	17	0	2	0	3	0	1	0	23	0
Al-Nassr	2021–22	SPL	23	0	2	0	3	0	—		28	0
Al-Nassr	2022–23	SPL	28	0	3	1	—		1	0	32	1
Al-Nassr	2023–24	SPL	26	1	5	0	9	0	5 (Note: Appearance(s) in Arab Club Champions Cup) 1	0	46	1
Al-Nassr	Al-Nassr Total		120	1	16	1	29	0	9	0	174	2
Career total			152	1	17	1	29	0	9	0	207	2

=== International ===
Statistics accurate as of match played 17 November 2026.

Saudi Arabia
Year	Apps	Goals
2018	9	0
2019	2	0
2022	2	0
2023	6	0
2024	9	0
2025	10	0
2026	11	0
Total	49	0

== Honours ==
=== Club ===
Al-Nassr

- Saudi Pro League: 2018–19, 2025–26
- Saudi Super Cup: 2019, 2020
- Arab Club Champions Cup: 2023
