= Ali Al-Hassan =

Saudi Arabian footballer

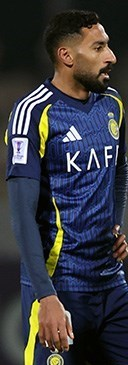
- Al-Hassan with Al Nassr in 2025

Personal information
- Full name: Ali Sadiq Nasser Al-Hassan
- Date of birth: 4 March 1997 (age 29)
- Place of birth: Al-Hasa, Saudi Arabia
- Height: 1.82 m (6 ft 0 in)
- Position: Midfielder

Team information
- Current team: Al-Fateh

Senior career*
Years	Team	Apps	(Gls)
2018–2020	Al-Fateh	43	(4)
2020–2026	Al Nassr	132	(3)
2026–	Al-Fateh	0	(0)

International career^{‡}
2018–2021	Saudi Arabia U23		
2021–	Saudi Arabia	18	(1)
- * Club domestic league appearances and goals as of 21 August 2026 ‡ National team caps and goals as of 29 June 2025

Ali Sadiq Nasser Al-Hassan (Arabic: عَلِيّ صَادِق نَاصِر الْحَسَن; born 4 March 1997) is a Saudi Arabian professional footballer who plays as a midfielder for Saudi Professional League club Al-Fateh and the Saudi Arabia national team.

== Personal life ==
Ali is the brother of Saudi Arabian professional footballer Abbas Al-Hassan, who plays as a midfielder.

== Career ==
=== Al-Fateh ===
Al-Hassan started his career at Al-Fateh and is a product of the Al-Fateh's youth system. On 17 February 2018, Al-Hassan made his professional debut for Al-Fateh against Al-Ittihad in the Pro League, replacing Abdelkader Oueslati. On 6 March 2018, Al-Hassan scored his first goal for the club in the 5–2 win against Al-Batin. He went on to make 5 appearances and score once in his first season with the first team.

On 20 November 2018, Al-Hassan underwent surgery in Germany and was sidelined for a month. He made his return on 21 December 2018 in the league match against Al-Ettifaq. On 5 January 2019, Al-Hassan signed a 5-year professional contract with Al-Fateh. In his second season as a first-team player, Al-Hassan made 16 appearances and scored once against Al-Fayha.

=== Al-Nassr ===
On 5 October 2020, Al-Hassan joined Al-Nassr on a five-year contract for a reported fee of SAR25 million.

== Career statistics ==
=== Club ===
As of 31 May 2024

Club	Season	League		King Cup		Asia		Other		Total	
Club	Season	Apps	Goals	Apps	Goals	Apps	Goals	Apps	Goals	Apps	Goals
Al-Fateh	2017–18	5	1	0	0	—		0	0	5	1
Al-Fateh	2018–19	16	1	2	0	—		—		18	1
Al-Fateh	2019–20	22	2	1	0	—		—		23	2
Al-Fateh	Total	43	4	3	0	0	0	0	0	46	4
Al-Nassr	2020–21	26	0	4	0	6	0	1 (Note: Appearance(s) in Saudi Super Cup)	0	37	0
Al-Nassr	2021–22	21	0	2	0	3	0	—		26	0
Al-Nassr	2022–23	21	0	3	0	—		0	0	24	0
Al-Nassr	2023–24	19	0	2	0	7	0	5 (Note: Appearance(s) in Arab Club Champions Cup)	0	33	0
Al-Nassr	Total	87	0	11	0	16	0	6	0	120	0
Career totals		130	4	14	0	16	0	6	0	166	4

=== International ===
Statistics accurate as of match played 29 June 2025.

Saudi Arabia
Year	Apps	Goals
2021	4	1
2022	10	0
2025	4	0
Total	18	1

=== International goals ===
Scores and results list Saudi Arabia's goal tally first.

Goal	Date	Venue	Opponent	Score	Result	Competition
1.	15 June 2021	King Saud University Stadium, Riyadh, Saudi Arabia	Uzbekistan	3–0	3–0	2022 FIFA World Cup qualification

== Honours ==
=== Club ===
Al-Nassr

- Saudi Pro League: 2025–26
- Saudi Super Cup: 2020
- Arab Club Champions Cup: 2023
