= Faraj Al-Ghashayan =

Saudi Arabian footballer (born 2000)

Personal information
- Full name: Faraj Abdullah Al-Ghashayan
- Date of birth: April 28, 2000 (age 26)
- Place of birth: Riyadh, Saudi Arabia
- Height: 1.71 m (5 ft 7 in)
- Position: Winger

Youth career
- –2019: Al-Nassr

Senior career*
Years	Team	Apps	(Gls)
2019–2022	Al-Nassr	1	(0)
2020	→ Al-Qadsiah (loan)	10	(1)
2022–2023	Al-Qadsiah	0	(0)
2023–2024	Al-Qaisumah		

International career
2018–2020	Saudi Arabia U-20		
- * Club domestic league appearances and goals

Faraj Abdullah Al-Ghashayan (Arabic: فرح عبد الله الغشيان, born April 28, 2000) is a Saudi Arabian professional footballer who plays as a winger.

== Career ==
Al-Ghashayan was promoted to Al-Nassr's first team in the 2019–2020 season and participated in the first match in the 2019 AFC Champions League against Al-Wahda which ended in a 1–1 draw. On 1 February 2020, Al-Ghashayan joined Al-Qadsiah on loan in a deal which saw Khalid Al-Ghannam join Al-Nassr. On 16 July 2022, Al-Ghashayan joined Al-Qadsiah on a permanent deal. On 13 July 2023, Al-Ghashayan joined Al-Qaisumah.

== Club career statistics ==
Club performance			League		Cup		Continental		Total	
Season	Club	League	Apps	Goals	Apps	Goals	Apps	Goals	Apps	Goals
Saudi Arabia			League		Kings Cup		Asia		Total	
2018–19	Al-Nassr	Saudi Professional League	0	0	0	1	0	0	1	0
2019–20	Al-Nassr	Saudi Professional League	0	0	0	0	1	0	1	0
Career Total			0	0	0	1	1	0	2	0

== Honours ==
Saudi Arabia U-20

- AFC U-19 Championship: 2018
