= Khalid Al-Ghwinem =

Saudi Arabian association football player

Personal information
- Full name: Khalid Abdulaziz Al-Ghwinem
- Date of birth: April 17, 1999 (age 27)
- Place of birth: Riyadh, Saudi Arabia
- Position: Midfielder

Team information
- Current team: Al-Kawkab
- Number: 46

Youth career
- –2019: Al-Nassr

Senior career*
Years	Team	Apps	(Gls)
2019–2022	Al-Nassr	1	(0)
2020–2021	→ Al-Tai (loan)	8	(0)
2021	→ Al-Thoqbah (loan)	4	(0)
2021–2022	→ Al-Shoulla (loan)	26	(0)
2022–2024	Ohod	26	(0)
2024–2025	Hajer	18	(0)
2026–	Al-Kawkab	0	(0)
- * Club domestic league appearances and goals

Khalid Abdulaziz Al-Ghwinem (Arabic: خالد عبد العزيز الغوينم, born April 17, 1999) is a Saudi Arabian professional footballer who currently plays for Al-Kawkab as a midfielder.

== Career ==
He made his first-team debut in the 2019 AFC Champions League group stage match against Al-Zawra'a. The match ended in a 2–1 win for Al-Nassr. He made his league debut on 19 December 2019, coming off the bench against Al-Adalah.

On 15 October 2020, Al-Ghwinem joined Al-Tai on loan until the end of the season. He made 8 appearances before his loan was cut short. On 15 February 2021, Al-Ghwinem joined Al-Thoqbah on loan until the end of the season. On 31 August 2021, Al-Ghwinem joined Al-Shoulla on loan. On 22 July 2022, Al-Ghwinem joined Ohod on a free transfer. On 7 September 2024, Al-Ghwinem joined Hajer.

== Club career statistics ==
As of 15 February 2021.

Club performance			League		Cup		Asia		Other		Total	
Season	Club	League	Apps	Goals	Apps	Goals	Apps	Goals	Apps	Goals	Apps	Goals
2018–19	Al-Nassr	Pro League	0	0	0	0	2	0	0	0	2	0
2019–20	Al-Nassr	Pro League	1	0	2	0	4	0	0	0	7	0
Club Total			1	0	2	0	6	0	0	0	9	0
2020–21	Al-Tai (loan)	MS League	8	0	–	–	–	–	–	–	8	0
2020–21	Al-Thoqbah (loan)	MS League	4	0	–	–	–	–	–	–	4	0
Career Total			13	0	2	0	6	0	0	0	21	0
