= Osama Al-Bawardi =

Saudi Arabian association football player

Osama Al-Bawardi أسامة البواردي
Personal information
- Full name: Osama Zaid Al-Bawardi
- Date of birth: 12 April 1999 (age 27)
- Place of birth: Saudi Arabia
- Height: 1.62 m (5 ft 4 in)
- Position: Right-back

Team information
- Current team: Al-Riyadh
- Number: 13

Youth career
- 2013–2019: Al-Nassr

Senior career*
Years	Team	Apps	(Gls)
2019–2022	Al-Nassr	0	(0)
2019–2020	→ Al-Jabalain (loan)	11	(0)
2020–2021	→ Al-Diriyah (loan)	34	(0)
2021–2022	→ Al-Sahel (loan)	35	(1)
2022–2023	Ohod	30	(0)
2023–2024	Al-Arabi	32	(0)
2024–2025	Al-Najma	32	(1)
2025–	Al-Riyadh	0	(0)
- * Club domestic league appearances and goals

Osama Al-Bawardi (Arabic: أسامة البواردي, born 12 April 1999) is a Saudi Arabian professional footballer who plays as a right back for Al-Riyadh.

== Career ==
Al-Bawardi began his career at the youth team of Al-Nassr on 25 July 2013 . On 25 August 2019, Al-Bawardi signed for Al-Jabalain on loan from Al-Nassr . On 4 September 2019, Al-Bowardi was subjected to a blow from one of the Al-Khaleej players in the match between the two teams in MS League . On 12 October, Al-Bawardi signed for Al-Diriyah on loan from Al-Nassr . On 13 August 2021, Al-Bawardi joined Al-Sahel on loan. On 16 July 2022, Al-Bawardi joined Ohod following the expiration of his contract with Al-Nassr. On 4 June 2023, Al-Bawardi joined Al-Arabi. On 19 July 2024, Al-Bawardi joined Al-Najma. On 17 June 2025, Al-Bawardi joined Pro League side Al-Riyadh.
