= Mohammed Al-Shanqiti =

Saudi Arabian association football player

Personal information
- Full name: Mohammed Ali Ramadan Al-Shanqiti
- Date of birth: May 15, 1999 (age 27)
- Place of birth: Medina, Saudi Arabia
- Height: 1.68 m (5 ft 6 in)
- Position: Left-back

Team information
- Current team: Al-Faisaly
- Number: 50

Youth career
- –2018: Al-Ansar
- 2018–2019: Al-Nassr

Senior career*
| Years | Team | Apps | (Gls) |
| 2019–2021 | Al-Nassr | 0 | (0) |
| 2019–2020 | → Al-Taawoun (loan) | 5 | (0) |
| 2020–2021 | → Al-Tai (loan) | 30 | (0) |
| 2021–2022 | Al-Ain | 26 | (0) |
| 2022–2024 | Al-Jabalain | 40 | (0) |
| 2024–2025 | Al-Qadsiah | 11 | (0) |
| 2025 | → Al-Orobah (loan) | 3 | (0) |
| 2025– | Al-Faisaly | 0 | (0) |

International career
| 2017–2019 | Saudi Arabia U20 | 20 | (0) |
| 2019– | Saudi Arabia U23 | | |
- * Club domestic league appearances and goals

Mohammed Al-Shanqiti (Arabic: محمد الشنقيطي; born March 15, 1999) is a Saudi Arabian professional footballer who currently plays for Al-Faisaly as a left-back.

== Career ==
Mohammed Al-Shanqeeti started his career at the youth team of Al-Ansar. On 10 January 2018, Al-Nassr signed Al-Shanqeeti for one season from Al-Ansar. On 24 August 2019, Al-Shanqiti joined Al-Taawoun on a season-long loan from Al-Nassr. He made his debut for Al-Taawoun on 1 October 2019 in the match against Al-Ittihad replacing the injured Talal Al-Absi. On 31 January 2020, Al-Shanqiti joined Al-Tai on a half season-long loan from Al-Nassr. The loan was renewed for another season. On 3 September 2021, Al-Shanqiti joined Al-Ain. On 23 June 2022, Al-Shanqiti joined Al-Jabalain. On 26 January 2024, Al-Shanqiti joined Al-Qadsiah on a two-and-a-half-year deal. On 1 February 2025, Al-Shanqiti joined Al-Orobah on a half season-long loan from Al-Qadsiah. On 30 September 2025, Al-Shanqiti joined Al-Faisaly.

== Career statistics ==
=== Club ===
As of 28 May 2024.

| Club | Season | League | | | Cup | | Continental | | Other | | Total | |
| Club | Season | Division | Apps | Goals | Apps | Goals | Apps | Goals | Apps | Goals | Apps | Goals |
|---|---|---|---|---|---|---|---|---|---|---|---|---|
| Al-Nassr | 2018–19 | Pro League | 0 | 0 | 0 | 0 | 0 | 0 | 0 | 0 | 0 | 0 |
| Al-Taawoun (loan) | 2019–20 | Pro League | 5 | 0 | 1 | 0 | – | | – | | 6 | 0 |
| Al-Tai (loan) | 2019–20 | First Division | 12 | 0 | 0 | 0 | – | | – | | 12 | 0 |
| Al-Tai (loan) | 2020–21 | First Division | 18 | 0 | – | | – | | – | | 18 | 0 |
| Al-Tai (loan) | Total | | 30 | 0 | 0 | 0 | 0 | 0 | 0 | 0 | 30 | 0 |
| Al-Ain | 2021–22 | First Division | 26 | 0 | – | | – | | – | | 26 | 0 |
| Al-Jabalain | 2022–23 | First Division | 22 | 0 | – | | – | | – | | 22 | 0 |
| Al-Jabalain | 2023–24 | First Division | 18 | 0 | 1 | 0 | – | | – | | 19 | 0 |
| Al-Jabalain | Total | | 40 | 0 | 1 | 0 | 0 | 0 | 0 | 0 | 41 | 0 |
| Al-Qadsiah | 2023–24 | First Division | 10 | 0 | 0 | 0 | – | | – | | 10 | 0 |
| Career total | | | 111 | 0 | 2 | 0 | 0 | 0 | 0 | 0 | 113 | 0 |

== Honours ==
=== Club ===
Al-Tai

- Saudi First Division third place: 2020–21 (Promotion to Pro League)

Al-Qadsiah

- First Division League: 2023–24

=== International ===
Saudi Arabia U20

- AFC U-19 Championship: 2018
