= 2020 Saudi Super Cup =

2020 Saudi Super Cup كأس السوبر السعودي 2020
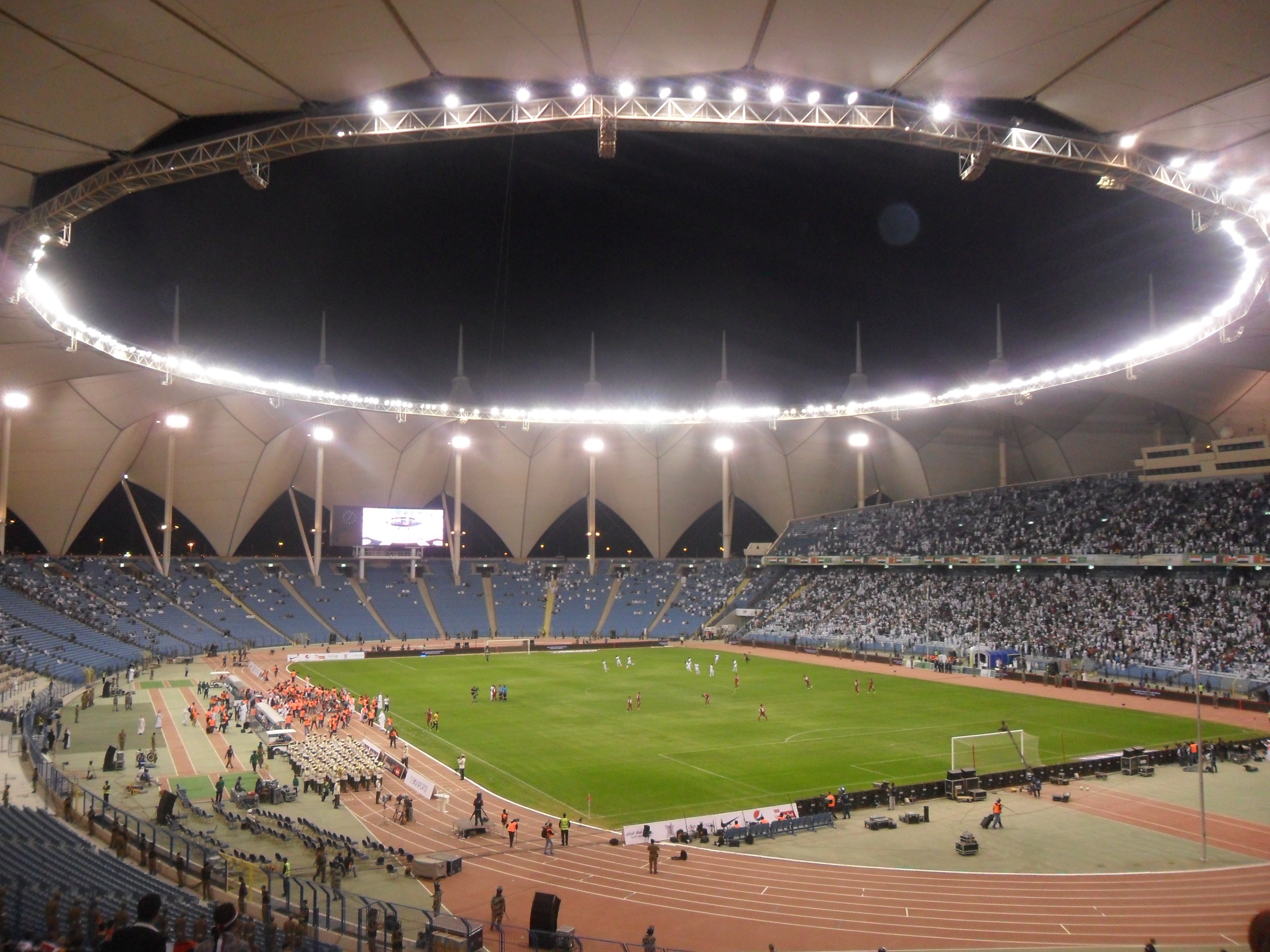
- The King Fahd International Stadium in Riyadh hosted the match
| Al-Hilal | Al-Nassr |
| Pro League King Cup | Pro League runners-up |
| 0 | 3 |
- Date: 30 January 2021
- Venue: King Fahd International Stadium, Riyadh
- Referee: Daniele Orsato (Italy)
- Attendance: 0 (Note: The match was played behind closed doors due to the COVID-19 pandemic in Saudi Arabia.)
- Weather: Clear; 15 °C (59 °F); 35% humidity

The 2020 Saudi Super Cup (also known as The Berain Saudi Super Cup for sponsorship reasons) was the seventh edition of the Saudi Super Cup, an annual football match contested by the winners of the previous season's Saudi Pro League and King Cup competitions.

The match was played on 30 January 2021 behind closed doors due to the COVID-19 pandemic at the King Fahd International Stadium in Riyadh, between Al-Hilal and Al-Nassr.

Al-Hilal won both the 2019–20 Saudi Pro League and the 2019–20 King Cup. Since the Saudi Crown Prince Cup was defunct, Al-Nassr qualified as the league runners-up.

Al-Nassr defeated Al-Hilal 3–0 to win their second Saudi Super Cup title. They became the first team to win two consecutive titles and set the record for the biggest goal margin in a Saudi Super Cup match at the time.

This was the first edition of the Saudi Super Cup to have a main sponsor, with the competition officially named "The Berain Saudi Super Cup."

== Venue ==
The King Fahd International Stadium in Riyadh was announced as the venue for the final on 20 December 2020. This was the second time the stadium hosted the Saudi Super Cup final and the fourth time the competition was held in Saudi Arabia.

The stadium was built in 1982 and officially opened in 1987. It was one of the main venues for the early editions of the FIFA Confederations Cup, hosting matches in 1992, 1995, and the 1997 tournaments.

The stadium had a seating capacity of 68,752 at the time, It previously served as a home ground for the Saudi Arabia national football team, Al-Hilal, Al-Shabab, and Al-Nassr before all three clubs moved to their own stadiums. The venue continues to host major domestic and international fixtures.

== Background ==
As part of a sponsorship agreement between the Saudi Arabian Football Federation (SAFF) and Saudi water company Berain, the match was officially referred to as "The Berain Saudi Super Cup". This was the first edition of the Saudi Super Cup to feature a title sponsor.

This was Al-Hilal’s fourth appearance in the competition and their first since the 2018 edition. Al-Hilal had previously won the title twice, in 2015 and 2018, and finished as runners-up once, in 2016. This was also Al-Nassr’s fourth appearance and their second in a row, having lost in 2014 and 2015 before winning their first title in 2019.

Al-Hilal qualified for the Super Cup by winning the 2019–20 Saudi Pro League on 29 August 2020. Since Al-Hilal also won the 2019–20 King Cup, Al-Nassr qualified as league runners-up, replacing the usual King's Cup finalist. Al-Nassr had defeated Al-Ahli in the semi-finals to reach the final but lost to Al-Hilal 2–1 on 28 November 2020.

This was the second time that Al-Hilal and Al-Nassr met in the Saudi Super Cup. Their first encounter came in 2015, with Al-Hilal winning 1–0 thanks to a goal from Carlos Eduardo. It was also the 11th final contested between the two clubs, with five wins apiece prior to this match. Overall, this was the 170th competitive meeting between them.

== Match ==
=== Details ===
30 January 2021
20:15 SAST

| Al-Hilal | 0–3 | Al-Nassr |
|---|---|---|
| | Report | Petros 61'; Hamdallah 82'; Al-Najei 90+2' |

King Fahd International Stadium, Riyadh
Attendance: 0
Referee: Daniele Orsato (Italy)

| Al-Hilal | Al-Nassr |

| GK | 1 | (Saudi Arabia) Abdullah Al-Mayouf |
| RB | 2 | (Saudi Arabia) Mohammed Al-Breik | | (substituted off) 84' |
| CB | 20 | (South Korea) Jang Hyun-soo |
| CB | 70 | (Saudi Arabia) Mohammed Jahfali | | (substituted off) 74' |
| LB | 12 | (Saudi Arabia) Yasser Al-Shahrani |
| RM | 29 | (Saudi Arabia) Salem Al-Dawsari | (yellow card) 64' |
| CM | 7 | (Saudi Arabia) Salman Al-Faraj (c) | | (substituted off) 26' |
| CM | 6 | (Colombia) Gustavo Cuéllar |
| LM | 10 | (Argentina) Luciano Vietto | (yellow card) 67' |
| CF | 18 | (France) Bafétimbi Gomis |
| CF | 9 | (Italy) Sebastian Giovinco | | (substituted off) 46' |
Substitutes:
| GK | 31 | (Saudi Arabia) Habib Al-Wotayan |
| DF | 22 | (Saudi Arabia) Amiri Kurdi |
| DF | 23 | (Saudi Arabia) Madallah Al-Olayan |
| MF | 8 | (Saudi Arabia) Abdullah Otayf |
| MF | 16 | (Saudi Arabia) Nasser Al-Dawsari | | (substituted on) 84' |
| MF | 19 | (Peru) André Carrillo | | (substituted on) 46' |
| MF | 28 | (Saudi Arabia) Mohamed Kanno | | (substituted on) 26' |
| MF | 55 | (Saudi Arabia) Hamad Al-Abdan |
| FW | 11 | (Saudi Arabia) Saleh Al-Shehri | | (substituted on) 74' |
Manager:
(Romania) Răzvan Lucescu

| GK | 1 | (Australia) Brad Jones |
| RB | 2 | (Saudi Arabia) Sultan Al-Ghanam |
| CB | 5 | (Saudi Arabia) Abdulelah Al-Amri |
| CB | 3 | (Saudi Arabia) Abdullah Madu (c) |
| LB | 27 | (Saudi Arabia) Osama Al-Khalaf | | (substituted off) 64' |
| CM | 6 | (Brazil) Petros | (yellow card) 52' |
| CM | 19 | (Saudi Arabia) Ali Al-Hassan |
| RW | 11 | (Morocco) Nordin Amrabat | (yellow card) 75' | (substituted off) 80' |
| AM | 8 | (Saudi Arabia) Abdulmajeed Al-Sulayhem | | (substituted off) 90+3' |
| LW | 24 | (Saudi Arabia) Khalid Al-Ghannam | (yellow card) 64' | (substituted off) 64' |
| CF | 70 | (Saudi Arabia) Raed Al-Ghamdi | | (substituted off) 63' |
Substitutes:
| GK | 33 | (Saudi Arabia) Waleed Abdullah |
| DF | 50 | (Saudi Arabia) Abdulaziz Al-Alawi |
| DF | 78 | (Saudi Arabia) Ali Lajami | | (substituted on) 64' |
| MF | 10 | (Argentina) Gonzalo Martínez | | (substituted on) 63' |
| MF | 14 | (Saudi Arabia) Sami Al-Najei | (yellow card) 90+3' | (substituted on) 80' |
| MF | 17 | (Saudi Arabia) Abdullah Al-Khaibari | | (substituted on) 90+3' |
| MF | 23 | (Saudi Arabia) Ayman Yahya |
| FW | 9 | (Morocco) Abderrazak Hamdallah | (yellow card) 84' | (substituted on) 64' |
| FW | 42 | (Saudi Arabia) Firas al-Buraikan |
Manager:
(Croatia) Alen Horvat

Assistant referees:
Alessandro Costanzo (Italy)
Matteo Passeri (Italy)
Fourth official:
Mohammed Al-Hoaish
Video assistant referee:
Massimiliano Irrati (Italy)
Assistant video assistant referees:
Mauro Vivenzi (Italy)

Match rules

- 90 minutes
- Penalty shoot-out if scores still level
- Nine named substitutes
- Maximum of five substitutions

=== Statistics ===
First half
| Statistic | Al-Hilal | Al-Nassr |
|---|---|---|
| Goals scored | 0 | 0 |
| Total shots | 5 | 5 |
| Shots on target | 3 | 4 |
| Saves | 2 | 0 |
| Ball possession | 59% | 41% |
| Corner kicks | 3 | 5 |
| Offsides | 2 | 0 |
| Yellow cards | 0 | 0 |
| Red cards | 0 | 0 |

Second half
| Statistic | Al-Hilal | Al-Nassr |
|---|---|---|
| Goals scored | 0 | 3 |
| Total shots | 6 | 6 |
| Shots on target | 1 | 5 |
| Saves | 3 | 1 |
| Ball possession | 67% | 33% |
| Corner kicks | 3 | 1 |
| Offsides | 2 | 1 |
| Yellow cards | 2 | 5 |
| Red cards | 0 | 0 |

Overall
| Statistic | Al-Hilal | Al-Nassr |
|---|---|---|
| Goals scored | 0 | 3 |
| Total shots | 11 | 11 |
| Shots on target | 4 | 9 |
| Saves | 5 | 1 |
| Ball possession | 63% | 37% |
| Corner kicks | 6 | 6 |
| Fouls committed | 8 | 15 |
| Offsides | 4 | 1 |
| Yellow cards | 2 | 5 |
| Red cards | 0 | 0 |

== See also ==
- 2019–20 Saudi Pro League
- 2019–20 King Cup
- 2020 King Cup Final
