= Muteb Al-Hammad =

Saudi Arabian footballer

Personal information
- Full name: Muteb Hammad Gharbi Al-Banaqi
- Date of birth: 13 August 1998 (age 28)
- Place of birth: Saudi Arabia
- Height: 1.73 m (5 ft 8 in)
- Position: Striker

Team information
- Current team: Al-Ain
- Number: 9

Youth career
- 2011–2015: Al-Almin
- 2015–2018: Al-Nassr

Senior career*
Years	Team	Apps	(Gls)
2017–2021	Al-Nassr	1	(0)
2018–2019	→ Al-Batin (loan)	6	(0)
2019–2020	→ Damac (loan)	1	(0)
2020	→ Al-Kawkab (loan)	12	(1)
2020–2021	→ Al-Thoqbah (loan)	30	(6)
2021–2023	Al-Hazem	4	(1)
2021–2022	→ Al-Ain (loan)	31	(9)
2023	→ Al-Qadsiah (loan)	8	(0)
2024–2025	Abha	0	(0)
2025–	Al-Ain		

International career
2015–2017	Saudi Arabia U-20		
2017–2019	Saudi Arabia U-23		
- * Club domestic league appearances and goals

Muteb Al-Hammad (Arabic:متعب الحماد, born 13 August 1998) is a Saudi football player who plays as a forward for Al-Ain.

On 27 January 2023, Al-Hammad joined Al-Qadsiah on loan.
