= Abdulkareem Al-Muziel =

Saudi Arabian association football player

Abdulkareem Al-Muziel عبد الكريم المزيعل
Personal information
- Full name: Abdulkareem Ali Al-Muziel
- Date of birth: 1999 (age 26–27)
- Place of birth: Saudi Arabia
- Height: 1.72 m (5 ft 8 in)
- Position: Right back

Youth career
- –2019: Al-Nassr

Senior career*
Years	Team	Apps	(Gls)
2019–2022	Al-Nassr	0	(0)
2019–2020	→ Al-Nojoom (loan)	17	(1)
2020	→ Al-Jabalain (loan)	10	(2)
2020–2021	→ Al-Taawoun (loan)	0	(0)
2022–2023	Al-Batin	3	(0)
2023–2024	Al-Jabalain		
- * Club domestic league appearances and goals

Abdulkareem Al-Muziel (Arabic: عبد الكريم المزيعل, born 1999) is a Saudi Arabian professional footballer who plays as a right back.

== Career ==
Al-Muziel began his career at the youth team of Al-Nassr. On 4 September 2019, Al-Muziel signed for Al-Nojoom on loan from Al-Nassr. On 27 June 2020, Al-Muziel joined Al-Jabalain on loan from Al-Nassr. On 25 October 2020, Al-Muziel joined Al-Taawoun on loan from Al-Nassr. On 20 July 2022, Al-Muziel joined Al-Batin on a permanent deal. On 11 July 2023, Al-Muziel joined Al-Jabalain.
