= Mansour Al-Shammari =

Saudi Arabian footballer (born 2000)

Mansour Al-Shammari منصور الشمري
Personal information
- Full name: Mansour Hamdan Reda Al-Shammari
- Date of birth: 21 August 2000 (age 26)
- Place of birth: Riyadh, Saudi Arabia
- Height: 1.72 m (5 ft 8 in)
- Position: Left back

Youth career
- 2014-2020: Al-Nassr

Senior career*
Years	Team	Apps	(Gls)
2020–2026	Al-Nassr	24	(0)
2020–2021	→ Al-Tai (loan)	34	(0)
2023	→ Al-Ahli (loan)	3	(0)
2023–2024	→ Al-Hazem (loan)	3	(0)
2024	→ Al-Jabalain (loan)	13	(0)
2024–2025	→ Al-Jubail (loan)	29	(0)

International career
2022	Saudi Arabia U23		
- * Club domestic league appearances and goals as of 2 January 2023

Mansour Al-Shammari (Arabic: منصور الشمري, born 21 August 2000) in Saudi Arabia is a Saudi professional footballer who currently plays as a left back.

== Career ==
Al-Shammari began his career at the youth team of Al-Nassr. He signed his first professional contract with Al-Nassr on 2 February 2020. He was called up to the first team in the 2020 AFC Champions League. On 15 October 2020, Al-Shammari joined Al-Tai on loan from Al-Nassr. Al-Shammari made 34 appearances as Al-Tai earned promotion to the Pro League for the first time since 2008. Following the conclusion of his loan, Al-Shammari returned to his parent club Al-Nassr. He made his debut for Al-Nassr on 30 September 2021, in the 3–1 away win against Abha. On 2 January 2023, Al-Shammari joined Al-Ahli on a six-month loan. On 6 August 2023, Al-Shammari joined Al-Hazem on a one-year loan. On 30 January 2024, Al-Shammari joined Al-Jabalain on a six-month loan.
