= Saud Zidan =

Saudi Arabian association football player

Saud Zidan سعود زيدان
Personal information
- Full name: Saud Saad Zidan
- Date of birth: 6 November 1999 (age 27)
- Place of birth: Saudi Arabia
- Height: 1.67 m (5 ft 6 in)
- Position: Midfielder

Team information
- Current team: Al-Jabalain (on loan from Al-Riyadh)
- Number: 14

Youth career
- –2019: Al-Nassr

Senior career*
Years	Team	Apps	(Gls)
2019–2021	Al-Nassr	0	(0)
2019–2020	→ Al-Jabalain (loan)	31	(1)
2020–2021	→ Abha (loan)	11	(0)
2021–2022	Al-Hazem	15	(0)
2022–2025	Al-Fayha	44	(2)
2025–	Al-Riyadh	11	(0)
2026–	→ Al-Jabalain (loan)	0	(0)

International career
2022	Saudi Arabia U23		
- * Club domestic league appearances and goals as of 7 March 2024

Saud Zidan (Arabic: سعود زيدان, born 6 November 1999) is a Saudi Arabian professional footballer who plays as a midfielder for Al-Jabalain, on loan from Al-Riyadh.

== Career ==
Saud Zidan signed his first professional, three-year, contract with Al-Nassr on 6 December 2018. On 1 September 2019, Zidan joined Al-Jabalain on loan. On 11 October 2020, Saud Zidan joined Abha on loan from Al-Nassr. On 8 July 2021, Zidan joined Al-Hazem on a permanent deal. On 3 July 2022, Zidan joined Al-Fayha on a three-year deal following Al-Hazem's relegation. On 30 January 2025, Zidan joined Al-Riyadh on a free transfer. On 28 January 2026, Zidan joined Al-Jabalain on loan.
