= Mohammed Al-Shahrani (footballer, born 1996) =

Saudi Arabian footballer

Personal information
- Full name: Mohammed Saad Al-Shahrani
- Date of birth: 26 March 1996 (age 30)
- Place of birth: Saudi Arabia
- Height: 1.67 m (5 ft 5 1/2 in)
- Position: Winger

Team information
- Current team: Al-Ain
- Number: 17

Youth career
- –2010: Damac
- 2010–2017: Al-Nassr

Senior career*
Years	Team	Apps	(Gls)
2017–2021	Al-Nassr	4	(0)
2018–2020	→ Damac (loan)	37	(5)
2020–2021	→ Al-Adalah (loan)	22	(1)
2021–2022	Al-Sahel	30	(2)
2022–2024	Al-Kholood	47	(0)
2024–2025	Al-Jandal	25	(0)
2025–	Al-Ain		
- * Club domestic league appearances and goals

Mohammed Al-Shahrani (Arabic:محمد الشهراني, born 26 March 1996) is a Saudi football player who plays for Al-Ain.

== Career ==
On 28 July 2024, Al-Shahrani joined Al-Jandal.

On 2 October 2025, Al-Shahrani joined Al-Ain.
