= Naif Almas =

Saudi Arabian association football player

Personal information
- Full name: Naif Mousa Saeed Almas
- Date of birth: 18 January 2000 (age 26)
- Place of birth: Riyadh, Saudi Arabia
- Height: 1.72 m (5 ft 8 in)
- Position: Defender

Youth career
- Al-Nassr

Senior career*
Years	Team	Apps	(Gls)
2019–2022	Al-Nassr	5	(0)
2020–2021	→ Al-Batin (loan)	12	(0)
2022–2025	Al-Fayha	0	(0)
2023–2024	→ Al-Orobah (loan)	0	(0)

International career^{‡}
2015	Saudi Arabia U16		(1)
2017–2020	Saudi Arabia U20	17	(0)
2020–2022	Saudi Arabia U23		
2021–	Saudi Arabia	2	(0)
- * Club domestic league appearances and goals as of 20 January 2019 ‡ National team caps and goals as of 7 December 2021

Naif Mousa Saeed Almas (Arabic: نايف موسى سعيد ألماس; born 18 January 2000) is a Saudi Arabian professional footballer who plays as a defender.

== Career ==
On 12 October 2020, Almas joined Al-Batin on a one-year loan from Al-Nassr. On 16 January 2022, Almas joined Al-Fayha on a three-and-a-half-year deal. On 30 August 2023, Almas joined Al-Orobah on a one-year loan.

== Honours ==
=== Club ===
Al-Nassr

- Saudi Super Cup: 2019

Al-Fayha

- King Cup: 2021–22

=== International ===
Saudi Arabia U20

- AFC U-19 Championship: 2018
