= 2020–21 Al-Ain FC season =

Al-Ain
2020–21 season
- President: Mazen bin Raddad
- Manager: Michael Skibbe (until 28 January); Pablo Machín (from 31 January)
- Stadium: King Saud Sport City Stadium
- Pro League: 16th (relegated)
- King Cup: Quarter-finals (knocked out by Al-Nassr)
- Top goalscorer: League: Amadou Moutari (7); All: Amadou Moutari (7)
- Highest home attendance: 250 (vs. Al-Batin, 30 May 2021)
- All statistics correct as of 30 May 2021.

The 2020–21 season was Al-Ain's first season in the Pro League after gaining promotion in the previous season and their 43rd year in existence. The club participated in the Pro League and the King Cup.

The season covered the period from 22 September 2020 to 30 June 2021.

== Players ==
=== Squad information ===
As of 1 February 2021

Note: Flags indicate national team as defined under FIFA eligibility rules; some limited exceptions apply. Players may hold more than one non-FIFA nationality.

No.	Pos.	Nation	Player
1	GK	KSA	Amin Bukhari (on loan from Al-Nassr)
2	DF	KSA	Ali Al-Khaibari (on loan from Al-Ettifaq)
3	DF	ANG	Bastos
4	DF	KSA	Amer Haroon
5	DF	KSA	Saif Al-Qeshtah
6	MF	SEN	Badou Ndiaye (on loan from Stoke City)
7	MF	KSA	Rabee Sufyani
9	FW	BRA	Getterson
10	MF	VEN	Juanpi
11	FW	EGY	Mohammad Fouad
12	DF	KSA	Hassan Muath
13	DF	KSA	Hussein Halawani (on loan from Al-Ettifaq)
15	MF	KSA	Saeed Al-Zahrani
17	DF	KSA	Mohammed Al-Shoraimi
19	DF	KSA	Abdullah Al-Rashidi
20	MF	NIG	Amadou Moutari

No.	Pos.	Nation	Player
21	GK	KSA	Saleh Al-Ohaymid (on loan from Al-Nassr)
23	DF	KSA	Yahya Kabi
24	MF	KSA	Omar Al-Sohaymi
25	DF	GHA	Abraham Frimpong
26	GK	KSA	Salem Al-Ghamdi
27	MF	KSA	Nawaf Al-Farshan (on loan from Al-Nassr)
28	MF	CRO	Filip Bradarić (on loan from Cagliari)
29	MF	KSA	Nawaf Al-Harthi
30	GK	KSA	Mohammed Mazyad
35	MF	KSA	Eid Al-Qahtani
37	DF	KSA	Abdulaziz Jahaf
70	FW	KSA	Faisel Al-Jamaan
71	MF	KSA	Ammar Al-Ibrahim
73	DF	KSA	Hassan Al-Harbi
77	MF	KSA	Saeed Al-Qarni (captain)

=== Out on loan ===
Note: Flags indicate national team as defined under FIFA eligibility rules; some limited exceptions apply. Players may hold more than one non-FIFA nationality.

No.	Pos.	Nation	Player
88	FW	KSA	Sajar Al-Shammeri (at Al-Diriyah until 30 June 2021)

== Transfers and loans ==
=== Transfers in ===
Entry date	Position	No.	Player	From club	Fee	Ref.
22 September 2020	DF	18	(Saudi Arabia) Abdulaziz Jahaf	(Saudi Arabia) Al-Ansar	End of loan	
26 September 2020	MF	24	(Saudi Arabia) Omar Al-Sohaymi	(Saudi Arabia) Al-Tai	Free	
1 October 2020	DF	19	(Saudi Arabia) Abdullah Al-Rashidi	(Saudi Arabia) Ohod	Undisclosed	
3 October 2020	DF	16	(Morocco) Mohamed Nahiri	(Morocco) Wydad	Free	
8 October 2020	DF	5	(Saudi Arabia) Saif Al-Qeshtah	(Saudi Arabia) Al-Hazem	Free	
9 October 2020	MF	20	(Niger) Amadou Moutari	(Hungary) Budapest Honvéd	Undisclosed	
10 October 2020	DF	17	(Saudi Arabia) Mohammed Al-Shoraimi	(Saudi Arabia) Al-Raed	Free	
10 October 2020	MF	10	(Venezuela) Juanpi	(Spain) Málaga	Free	
13 October 2020	FW	9	(Brazil) Getterson	(Portugal) Marítimo	$1,185,000	
14 October 2020	MF	8	(Algeria) Saphir Taïder	(Canada) Montreal Impact	Undisclosed	
18 October 2020	MF	7	(Saudi Arabia) Rabee Sufyani	(Saudi Arabia) Al-Taawoun	Free	
21 October 2020	MF	29	(Saudi Arabia) Nawaf Al-Harthi	(Saudi Arabia) Al-Wehda	Free	
22 October 2020	DF	3	(Angola) Bastos	(Italy) Lazio	$830,000	
18 January 2021	DF	12	(Saudi Arabia) Hassan Muath	(Saudi Arabia) Al-Shabab	Free	
3 February 2021	DF	25	(Ghana) Abraham Frimpong	(Hungary) Ferencváros	Undisclosed	

=== Loans in ===
Start date	End date	Position	No.	Player	From club	Fee	Ref.
7 October 2020	End of season	GK	21	(Saudi Arabia) Saleh Al Ohaymid	(Saudi Arabia) Al-Nassr	None	
14 October 2020	End of season	MF	27	(Saudi Arabia) Nawaf Al-Farshan	(Saudi Arabia) Al-Nassr	None	
16 October 2020	End of season	GK	1	(Saudi Arabia) Amin Bukhari	(Saudi Arabia) Al-Nassr	None	
24 October 2020	End of season	MF	28	(Croatia) Filip Bradarić	(Italy) Cagliari	None	
7 February 2021	End of season	DF	2	(Saudi Arabia) Ali Al-Khaibari	(Saudi Arabia) Al-Ettifaq	None	
7 February 2021	End of season	DF	13	(Saudi Arabia) Hussein Halawani	(Saudi Arabia) Al-Ettifaq	None	
7 February 2021	End of season	MF	6	(Senegal) Badou Ndiaye	(England) Stoke City	None	

=== Transfers out ===
Exit date	Position	No.	Player	To club	Fee	Ref.
22 September 2020	DF	12	(Saudi Arabia) Hamad Al-Dawsari	(Saudi Arabia) Al-Adalah	End of loan	
22 September 2020	MF	7	(Saudi Arabia) Mutair Al-Zahrani	(Saudi Arabia) Al-Taawoun	Free	
22 September 2020	MF	25	(Guinea) Aboubacar Sylla		Released	
22 September 2020	MF	29	(Saudi Arabia) Nawaf Al-Harthi	(Saudi Arabia) Al-Wehda	End of loan	
22 September 2020	MF	90	(Tunisia) Youssef Fouzai	(Saudi Arabia) Al-Adalah	End of loan	
22 September 2020	FW	15	(Saudi Arabia) Hamed Al Maqati	(Saudi Arabia) Al-Hazem	End of loan	
26 September 2020	DF	35	(Saudi Arabia) Ahmed Al-Nufaili	(Saudi Arabia) Hajer	Free	
29 September 2020	MF	9	(Saudi Arabia) Saad Al-Harbi	(Saudi Arabia) Hajer	Free	
1 October 2020	DF	24	(Ivory Coast) Soualio Ouattara	(Saudi Arabia) Al-Fayha	Free	
3 October 2020	DF	17	(Saudi Arabia) Ziyad Al-Jarrad	(Saudi Arabia) Al-Fayha	Free	
6 October 2020	GK	1	(Saudi Arabia) Saad Al-Saleh	(Saudi Arabia) Al-Tai	Free	
6 October 2020	MF	8	(Saudi Arabia) Hassan Al-Heji	(Saudi Arabia) Al-Nahda	Free	
8 October 2020	DF	2	(Saudi Arabia) Rashed Al-Raheeb	(Saudi Arabia) Ohod	Free	
12 October 2020	MF	13	(Saudi Arabia) Ahmed Krenshi	(Saudi Arabia) Al-Bukayriyah	Free	
23 October 2020	FW	14	(Nigeria) Peter Nworah	(Saudi Arabia) Hajer	Free	
25 October 2020	FW	99	(Saudi Arabia) Ali Khormi	(Saudi Arabia) Al-Kawkab	Free	
1 November 2020	MF	16	(Saudi Arabia) Ismael Musallami	(Saudi Arabia) Al-Adalah	Free	
6 November 2020	MF	55	(Saudi Arabia) Moataz Tombakti	(Saudi Arabia) Al-Shoulla	Free	

=== Loans out ===
Start date	End date	Position	No.	Player	To club	Fee	Ref.
31 January 2021	End of season	FW	88	(Saudi Arabia) Sajar Al-Shammeri	(Saudi Arabia) Al-Diriyah	None	

== Competitions ==
=== Overview ===
Competition	Record							
Competition	G	W	D	L	GF	GA	GD	Win %
Pro League	30	5	5	20	34	64	−30	16.67
King Cup	2	1	0	1	2	3	−1	50.00
Total	32	6	5	21	36	67	−31	18.75

Updated to match played 30 May 2021
Source: Competitions

=== Pro League ===
==== League table ====
Pos	Team	Pld	W	D	L	GF	GA	GD	Pts	Qualification or relegation
12	Al-Batin	30	9	9	12	43	55	−12	36 (Note: Positions determined by head-to-head points: Al-Faisaly: 16 pts; Al-Raed: 15 pts; Damac: 13 pts; Al-Batin: 12 pts; Abha: 3 pts.)	
13	Abha	30	10	6	14	42	50	−8	36	
14	Al-Qadsiah (R)	30	8	11	11	41	47	−6	35	Relegation to MS League
15	Al-Wehda (R)	30	9	5	16	40	60	−20	32	Relegation to MS League
16	Al-Ain (R)	30	5	5	20	34	64	−30	20	Relegation to MS League

Source: spl.com source=إحصائيات رابطة دوري المحترفين السعودي 2020-2021
Rules for classification: 1) Points; 2) Head-to-head points; 3) Head-to-head goal difference; 4) Total goal difference; 5) Total goals scored; 6) Fair-play points (Note: Head-to-head record is used only after all the matches between the teams in question have been played).
(R) Relegated

==== Results summary ====
Overall								Home						Away					
Pld	W	D	L	GF	GA	GD	Pts	W	D	L	GF	GA	GD	W	D	L	GF	GA	GD
30	5	5	20	34	64	−30	20	4	2	9	21	32	−11	1	3	11	13	32	−19

Last updated: 30 May 2021.
Source: soccerway.com

==== Results by round ====
Round	1	2	3	4	5	6	7	8	9	10	11	12	13	14	15	16	17	18	19	20	21	22	23	24	25	26	27	28	29	30
Ground	A	A	H	H	A	H	A	H	A	H	H	A	H	H	A	H	H	A	A	H	A	H	A	H	A	A	H	A	A	H
Result	L	L	L	L	W	W	D	L	L	W	L	L	L	L	L	L	W	L	D	D	L	D	D	W	L	L	L	L	L	L
Position	16	16	16	16	13	13	13	14	14	14	15	15	15	16	16	16	16	16	16	16	16	16	16	16	16	16	16	16	16	16

Updated to match(es) played on 30 May 2021. Source: soccerway.com
A = Away; H = Home; W = Win; D = Draw; L = Loss

==== Matches ====
All times are local, AST (UTC+3).

Win Draw Loss Postponed

17 October 2020 1	Al-Hilal	1–0	Al-Ain	Riyadh
21:15	Al-Bulaihi 49'	Report	Al-Qarni (yellow card) 27'; Nworah (yellow card) 78'	Stadium: Prince Faisal bin Fahd Stadium; Attendance: 0 Referee: Sultan Al-Harbi

24 October 2020 2	Al-Ettifaq	2–1	Al-Ain	Dammam
17:40	Sliti 12'; M'Bolhi (yellow card) 47'; Kiss (yellow card) 58'; Al-Ghamdi (yellow card) 86'; Mahnashi 89'	Report	Taïder 48' (pen.); Moutari (yellow card) 58'	Stadium: Prince Mohamed bin Fahd Stadium; Attendance: 0 Referee: Mohammed Al-Qarni

30 October 2020 3	Al-Ain	2–4	Al-Fateh	Al Bahah
15:40	Getterson 32'; Moutari (yellow card) 39'; Fouad 64'; Bradarić (yellow card) 75'; Kabi (red card) 89'	Report	Boushal 3'; Kanabah (yellow card) 81'; Batna 82', 90+5'; Wikheim 90'	Stadium: King Saud Sport City Stadium; Attendance: 0 Referee: Mohammed Al-Nuhait

7 November 2020 4	Al-Ain	3–4	Al-Ahli	Al Bahah
15:35	Taïder 25' (pen.); Al-Harbi 44'; Moutari 45+1'	Report	Al Somah 19' (pen.), 20', 38'; Hassoun (yellow card) 45+1'; Owusu (yellow card) 50', (goal) 65'	Stadium: King Saud Sport City Stadium; Attendance: 0 Referee: Abdullah Al-Shehri

23 November 2020 5	Damac	0–2	Al-Ain	Abha
15:30	Vittor (yellow card) 36'	Report	Al-Jamaan 11'; Bukhari (yellow card) 64'; Taïder 90+4' (pen.)	Stadium: Prince Sultan bin Abdul Aziz Stadium; Attendance: 0 Referee: Ahmad Al-Rumaikhani

28 November 2020 6	Al-Ain	1–0	Al-Raed	Al Bahah
15:35	Getterson (yellow card) 24', (goal) 90+1'; Al-Shoraimi (yellow card) 28'; Al-Qeshtah (yellow card) 29'; Al-Harbi (yellow card) 70'	Report	Djoum (yellow card) 55'; Fouzair (yellow card) 79' (yellow-red card) 81'	Stadium: King Saud Sport City Stadium; Attendance: 0 Referee: Khaled Salwi

5 December 2020 7	Al-Faisaly	1–1	Al-Ain	Al Majma'ah
17:45	Rossi (yellow card) 8'; Silva 35'; Merkel (yellow card) 62'; Faik (yellow card) 77'; Al-Saiari (yellow card) 82'	Report	Al-Qeshtah (yellow card) 34'; Moutari 54'	Stadium: Al Majma'ah Sports City; Attendance: 0 Referee: Sultan Al-Harbi

11 December 2020 8	Al-Ain	1–2	Al-Qadsiah	Al Bahah
15:35	Bastos 36'; Al-Qarni (yellow card) 70'	Report	Al-Amri 38', 79'; Al-Safri (yellow card) 77'	Stadium: King Saud Sport City Stadium; Attendance: 0 Referee: Sami Al-Jires

22 December 2020 9	Al-Wehda	2–1	Al-Ain	Mecca
18:20	Hernâni 25'; Al-Harbi 77' (o.g.); Anselmo (yellow card) 90+2'	Report	Moutari 28'; Bastos (yellow card) 51'; Saeed Al-Qarni (yellow card) 74'; Fouad (yellow card) 84'	Stadium: King Abdul Aziz Stadium; Attendance: 0 Referee: Khaled Al-Johani

27 December 2020 10	Al-Ain	1–0	Al-Taawoun	Al Bahah
15:45	Moutari (yellow card) 6'; Juanpi 16'; Getterson (yellow card) 42'	Report	Manoel (yellow card) 33'; Al-Sobhi (yellow card) 39'; Barnawi (yellow card) 51'	Stadium: King Saud Sport City Stadium; Attendance: 0 Referee: Abdullah Al-Shehri

1 January 2021 11	Al-Ain	2–4	Abha	Al Bahah
15:50	Juanpi 22'; Aouadhi 68' (o.g.)	Report	Strandberg 31', 81', 89', (yellow card) 90+1'; Amr (yellow card) 40'; Sharahili 56'; Barnawi (yellow card) 85'; Mhamdi (yellow card) 88'	Stadium: King Saud Sport City Stadium; Attendance: 0 Referee: Ahmad Al-Rumaikhani

8 January 2021 12	Al-Nassr	3–0	Al-Ain	Riyadh
19:55	K. Al-Ghannam 46'; Amrabat (yellow card) 73'; Martínez 80'; Al-Najei 82'	Report	Bradarić (yellow card) 27'; Al-Qeshtah (yellow card) 77'; Getterson (yellow card) 84'; Kabi (yellow card) 85'	Stadium: King Fahd International Stadium; Attendance: 0 Referee: Mohammed Al-Nuhait

14 January 2021 13	Al-Ain	0–3	Al-Shabab	Al Bahah
15:55	Al-Qeshtah (yellow card) 39'	Report	Guanca 60', 90+4', (yellow card) 62'; Al-Hamdan 81'	Stadium: King Saud Sport City Stadium; Attendance: 0 Referee: Sultan Al-Harbi

19 January 2021 14	Al-Ain	1–2	Al-Ittihad	Al Bahah
16:00	Nahiri (yellow card) 33'; Getterson 87'; Moutari (yellow card) 89'	Report	Camara 13'; Romarinho 24'; Hawsawi (yellow card) 43'; Hegazi (yellow card) 48'; El Ahmadi (yellow card) 64'	Stadium: King Saud Sport City Stadium; Attendance: 0 Referee: Mohammed Al-Qarni

26 January 2021 15	Al-Batin	2–1	Al-Ain	Hafar al-Batin
15:30	Sami (yellow card) 30'; Al-Sohaymi 58' (o.g.); Abreu 75'; Schenk (yellow card) 90+3'; Al Khairi (yellow card) 90+5'	Report	Al-Harbi (yellow card) 16'; Bradarić (yellow card) 38'; Juanpi 90+4'	Stadium: Al-Batin Club Stadium; Attendance: 0 Referee: Turki Al-Khudhayr

4 February 2021 17	Al-Ain	1–0	Al-Ettifaq	Al Bahah
16:05	Juanpi 24', (yellow card) 77'; Bastos (yellow card) 73'; Bradarić (yellow card) 86'	Report	Al Salis (yellow card) 80'	Stadium: King Saud Sport City Stadium; Attendance: 0 Referee: Mohammed Al-Hoaish

9 February 2021 16	Al-Ain	0–5	Al-Hilal	Al Bahah
16:05	Juanpi (yellow card) 19'; Al-Qarni (yellow card) 25'	Report	Gomis 9' (pen.), 45+5' (pen.), 57' (pen.), 78', (yellow card) 42'; S. Al-Dawsari (yellow card) 71', (goal) 90+4'; Carrillo (yellow card) 75'	Stadium: King Saud Sport City Stadium; Attendance: 0 Referee: Abdullah Al-Harbi

13 February 2021 18	Al-Fateh	3–2	Al-Ain	Al-Hasa
18:10	Al-Daheem (yellow card) 21'; Soudani (yellow card) 46' te Vrede 53', 75', 84'; Buhimed (yellow card) 90+7'	Report	Bastos 50', (yellow card) 90+5'; Juanpi 61'; Moutari (yellow card) 82'; Ndiaye (yellow card) 90+3'	Stadium: Prince Abdullah bin Jalawi Stadium; Attendance: 0 Referee: Majed Al-Shamrani

17 February 2021 19	Al-Ahli	1–1	Al-Ain	Jeddah
20:20	Ghareeb 84'	Report	Bradarić 39'; Fouad (yellow card) 62'; Al-Shoraimi (yellow card) 75'; Kabi (yellow card) 77'	Stadium: King Abdullah Sports City Reserve Stadium; Attendance: 0 Referee: Mohammed Al-Esmaiel

23 February 2021 20	Al-Ain	1–1	Damac	Al Bahah
16:10	Kabi (yellow card) 8'; Bastos (yellow card) 45+2'; Al-Harbi 46'	Report	Al-Najej (yellow card) 49'; Majrashi (yellow card) 73'; Hamzi 77'	Stadium: King Saud Sport City Stadium; Attendance: 0 Referee: Mohammed Al-Hoaish

28 February 2021 21	Al-Raed	4–0	Al-Ain	Buraidah
16:00	Al-Mogren 16', 53', 62'; Fernández 82'	Report	Ndiaye (yellow card) 42'; Bradarić (yellow card) 45+1'; Fouad (yellow card) 76'	Stadium: King Abdullah Sport City Stadium; Attendance: 0 Referee: Abdullah Al-Shehri

5 March 2021 22	Al-Ain	1–1	Al-Faisaly	Al Bahah
16:15	Moutari 15'; Al-Harbi (yellow card) 65'; Kabi (yellow card) 75'; Juanpi (yellow card) 90+2'	Report	Al-Saiari (yellow card) 37'; Guilherme 38'; Majrashi (yellow card) 69'	Stadium: King Saud Sport City Stadium; Attendance: 0 Referee: Shukri Al-Hanfoush

10 March 2021 23	Al-Qadsiah	3–3	Al-Ain	Khobar
18:25	Ohawuchi (yellow card) 28'; James 37', 76'; Al-Dawsari (yellow card) 50'; Vitas (yellow card) 57'; Al-Shoeil (yellow card) 85'; Al-Nattar (yellow card) 87'; Andria 90+3'	Report	Halawani 31'; Getterson 73' (pen.); Moutari 79'; Juanpi (yellow card) 85'; Bukhari (yellow card) 90+5'; Al-Jamaan (yellow card) 90+8'	Stadium: Prince Saud bin Jalawi Stadium; Attendance: 0 Referee: Khaled Al-Johani

21 March 2021 24	Al-Ain	4–0	Al-Wehda	Al Bahah
16:10	Ndiaye 45'; Bastos (yellow card) 68'; Moutari 81'; Al-Jamaan 87'; Sufyani (yellow card) 88'; Fouad 90+2'	Report	Al-Owaishir (yellow card) 46'; Al-Qarni (yellow card) 90'	Stadium: King Saud Sport City Stadium; Attendance: 0 Referee: Sultan Al-Harbi

9 April 2021 25	Al-Taawoun	3–0	Al-Ain	Buraidah
19:00	Al-Jouei 29'; Al-Ghamdi (yellow card) 40'; Abousaban (yellow card) 63'; Santos 76'; Tawamba (yellow card) 89'; Kaku 90+5' (pen.)	Report	Ndiaye (yellow card) 45+4'; Al-Sohaymi (yellow card) 47'; Moutari (yellow card) 56'; Al-Jamaan (yellow card) 72'	Stadium: King Abdullah Sport City Stadium; Attendance: 0 Referee: Khaled Salwi

15 April 2021 26	Abha	1–0	Al-Ain	Abha
21:50	Strandberg 17'; Amr (yellow card) 85'; Al-Habib (yellow card) 89'	Report	Al-Sohaymi (yellow card) 52'; Sufyani (yellow card) 90+1'	Stadium: Prince Sultan bin Abdul Aziz Stadium; Attendance: 0 Referee: Ahmad Al-Rumaikhani

14 May 2021 27	Al-Ain	0–2	Al-Nassr	Al Bahah
19:20	Al-Sohaymi (yellow card) 32'; Al-Harbi (yellow card) 53'	Report	Hamdallah 45' (pen.); Amrabat (yellow card) 45+3' (yellow-red card) 76', (goal) 67'; Ar. Al-Dawsari (red card) 89'	Stadium: King Saud Sport City Stadium; Attendance: 0 Referee: Abdullah Al-Shehri

19 May 2021 28	Al-Shabab	5–1	Al-Ain	Riyadh
19:10	Sebá 36'; Ighalo 41'; N'Diaye (yellow card) 43'; Banega 67' (pen.); Guanca 72'; Lichnovsky 83'	Report	Ndiaye 45'; Fouad (yellow card) 81'	Stadium: Prince Khalid bin Sultan Stadium; Attendance: 1,085; Referee: Sami Al-Jires

25 May 2021 29	Al-Ittihad	1–0	Al-Ain	Jeddah
21:00	Hegazi 31'; Abdulhamid (yellow card) 88'	Report	Ndiaye (yellow card) 45+2'	Stadium: King Abdullah Sports City; Attendance: 211; Referee: Khaled Al-Teris

30 May 2021 30	Al-Ain	3–4	Al-Batin	Al Bahah
21:00	Sufyani 50', 66'; Moutari 57'; Al-Qeshtah (yellow card) 71'; Bradarić (yellow card) 76'	Report	Abreu 29'; Rayhi 35', 85' (pen.); El Jebli 76' (pen.); Sharahili (yellow card) 89'; Campaña (yellow card) 90+4'	Stadium: King Saud Sport City Stadium; Attendance: 250; Referee: Abdullah Al-Harbi

=== King Cup ===
All times are local, AST (UTC+3).

17 December 2020 Round of 16	Al-Ahli	0–2	Al-Ain	Jeddah
20:20	Lima (yellow card) 32'; Fejsa (yellow card) 45+3'	Report	Getterson (yellow card) 42', (goal) 64'; Bradarić 71' (pen.)	Stadium: King Abdullah Sports City Reserve Stadium; Attendance: 0 Referee: Mohammed Al-Qarni

16 March 2021 Quarter-finals	Al-Nassr	3–0	Al-Ain	Riyadh
18:40	Al-Hassan (yellow card) 38'; Hamdallah 45+4'; Amrabat 72'; Al-Najei 83'	Report	Ndiaye (yellow card) 25'; Al-Khaibari (yellow card) 35'; Bradarić (yellow card) 45+6'; Moutari (yellow card) 47'; Getterson (yellow card) 74'; Juanpi (yellow card) 74'; Muath (yellow card) 78'	Stadium: Mrsool Park; Attendance: 0 Referee: Turki Al-Khudhayr

== Statistics ==
=== Appearances ===
Last updated on 30 May 2021.

No.	Pos	Nat	Player	Total		Pro League		King Cup	
No.	Pos	Nat	Player	Apps	Goals	Apps	Goals	Apps	Goals
Goalkeepers
1	GK	(Saudi Arabia) KSA	Amin Bukhari	22	0	21	0	1	0
21	GK	(Saudi Arabia) KSA	Saleh Al-Ohaymid	4	0	2+2	0	0	0
26	GK	(Saudi Arabia) KSA	Salem Al-Ghamdi	0	0	0	0	0	0
30	GK	(Saudi Arabia) KSA	Mohammed Mazyad	9	0	7+1	0	1	0
Defenders
2	DF	(Saudi Arabia) KSA	Ali Al-Khaibari	9	0	7+1	0	1	0
3	DF	(Angola) ANG	Bastos	24	2	22	2	2	0
4	DF	(Saudi Arabia) KSA	Amer Haroon	1	0	0+1	0	0	0
5	DF	(Saudi Arabia) KSA	Saif Al-Qeshtah	24	0	19+4	0	1	0
12	DF	(Saudi Arabia) KSA	Hassan Muath	14	0	10+3	0	1	0
13	DF	(Saudi Arabia) KSA	Hussein Halawani	11	1	4+6	1	0+1	0
17	DF	(Saudi Arabia) KSA	Mohammed Al-Shoraimi	17	0	10+6	0	0+1	0
19	DF	(Saudi Arabia) KSA	Abdullah Al-Rashidi	4	0	0+4	0	0	0
23	DF	(Saudi Arabia) KSA	Yahya Kabi	25	0	18+5	0	1+1	0
25	DF	(Ghana) GHA	Abraham Frimpong	10	0	6+3	0	0+1	0
37	DF	(Saudi Arabia) KSA	Abdulaziz Jahaf	0	0	0	0	0	0
73	DF	(Saudi Arabia) KSA	Hassan Al-Harbi	28	2	27	2	1	0
Midfielders
6	MF	(Senegal) SEN	Badou Ndiaye	14	2	13	2	1	0
7	MF	(Saudi Arabia) KSA	Rabee Sufyani	14	2	3+10	2	0+1	0
10	MF	(Venezuela) VEN	Juanpi	20	5	16+2	5	2	0
11	MF	(Egypt) EGY	Mohammad Fouad	27	2	17+9	2	1	0
15	MF	(Saudi Arabia) KSA	Saeed Al-Zahrani	5	0	2+3	0	0	0
20	MF	(Niger) NIG	Amadou Moutari	30	7	25+3	7	2	0
24	MF	(Saudi Arabia) KSA	Omar Al-Sohaymi	21	0	11+8	0	0+2	0
27	MF	(Saudi Arabia) KSA	Nawaf Al-Farshan	7	0	3+4	0	0	0
28	MF	(Croatia) CRO	Filip Bradarić	27	2	23+2	1	2	1
29	MF	(Saudi Arabia) KSA	Nawaf Al-Harthi	8	0	5+2	0	1	0
35	MF	(Saudi Arabia) KSA	Eid Al-Qahtani	1	0	0+1	0	0	0
71	MF	(Saudi Arabia) KSA	Ammar Al-Ibrahim	1	0	0+1	0	0	0
77	MF	(Saudi Arabia) KSA	Saeed Al-Qarni	14	0	9+4	0	1	0
Forwards
9	FW	(Brazil) BRA	Getterson	30	5	25+3	4	2	1
70	FW	(Saudi Arabia) KSA	Faisel Al-Jamaan	27	2	6+19	2	0+2	0
Players sent out on loan this season
88	FW	(Saudi Arabia) KSA	Sajar Al-Shammeri	3	0	0+3	0	0	0
Player who made an appearance this season but have left the club
8	MF	(Algeria) ALG	Saphir Taïder	7	3	6+1	3	0	0
14	FW	(Nigeria) NGR	Peter Nworah	1	0	1	0	0	0
16	DF	(Morocco) MAR	Mohamed Nahiri	16	0	12+3	0	1	0
18	FW	(Tunisia) TUN	Haythem Jouini	1	0	0+1	0	0	0

=== Goalscorers ===
Rank	No.	Pos	Nat	Name	Pro League	King Cup	Total
1	20	MF	(Niger)	Amadou Moutari	7	0	7
2	9	FW	(Brazil)	Getterson	4	1	5
2	10	MF	(Venezuela)	Juanpi	5	0	5
4	8	MF	(Algeria)	Saphir Taïder	3	0	3
5	3	DF	(Angola)	Bastos	2	0	2
5	6	MF	(Senegal)	Badou Ndiaye	2	0	2
5	7	MF	(Saudi Arabia)	Rabee Sufyani	2	0	2
5	11	MF	(Egypt)	Mohammad Fouad	2	0	2
5	28	MF	(Croatia)	Filip Bradarić	1	1	2
5	70	FW	(Saudi Arabia)	Faisel Al-Jamaan	2	0	2
5	73	DF	(Saudi Arabia)	Hassan Al-Harbi	2	0	2
12	13	DF	(Saudi Arabia)	Hussein Halawani	1	0	1
Own goal					1	0	1
Total					34	2	36

Last Updated: 30 May 2021

=== Assists ===
Rank	No.	Pos	Nat	Name	Pro League	King Cup	Total
1	10	MF	(Venezuela)	Juanpi	5	0	5
1	28	MF	(Croatia)	Filip Bradarić	5	0	5
3	9	FW	(Brazil)	Getterson	4	0	4
4	7	MF	(Saudi Arabia)	Rabee Sufyani	2	0	2
4	11	MF	(Egypt)	Mohammad Fouad	2	0	2
4	20	MF	(Niger)	Amadou Moutari	2	0	2
7	6	MF	(Senegal)	Badou Ndiaye	1	0	1
7	8	MF	(Algeria)	Saphir Taïder	1	0	1
Total					22	0	22

Last Updated: 30 May 2021

=== Clean sheets ===
Rank	No.	Pos	Nat	Name	Pro League	King Cup	Total
1	1	GK	(Saudi Arabia)	Amin Bukhari	5	0	5
2	30	GK	(Saudi Arabia)	Mohammed Mazyad	1	1	2
3	21	GK	(Saudi Arabia)	Saleh Al-Ohaymid	1	0	1
Total					5	1	6

Last Updated: 21 March 2021
