= 2020–21 Al-Nassr FC season =

Al-Nassr
2020–21 season
- President: Safwan Al-Suwaiket (until 21 March); Musalli Al-Muammar (from 4 April)
- Manager: Rui Vitória (until 27 December); Alen Horvat (from 27 December until 9 April); Mano Menezes (from 9 April)
- Stadium: Mrsool Park
- SPL: 6th
- King Cup: Semi-finals (knocked out by Al-Faisaly)
- Champions League: Round of 16
- Super Cup: Winners
- Top goalscorer: League: Abderrazak Hamdallah (11); All: Abderrazak Hamdallah (17)
Home colours	Away colours
- All statistics correct as of 30 May 2021.

The 2020–21 season was Al-Nassr's 45th consecutive season in the top flight of Saudi football and 65th year in existence as a football club. The club participated in the Pro League, the King Cup, and the AFC Champions League.

The season covered the period from 3 October 2020 to 30 June 2021.

== Players ==
=== Squad information ===
As of 1 February 2021

Note: Flags indicate national team as defined under FIFA eligibility rules; some limited exceptions apply. Players may hold more than one non-FIFA nationality.

No.	Pos.	Nation	Player
1	GK	AUS	Brad Jones
2	DF	KSA	Sultan Al-Ghanam
3	DF	KSA	Abdullah Madu
5	DF	KSA	Abdulelah Al-Amri
6	MF	BRA	Petros
8	MF	KSA	Abdulmajeed Al-Sulayhem
9	FW	MAR	Abderrazak Hamdallah
10	MF	ARG	Pity Martínez
11	MF	MAR	Nordin Amrabat
13	DF	KSA	Abdulrahman Al-Obaid
14	MF	KSA	Sami Al-Najei
15	MF	KSA	Abdullaziz Al-Dawsari
17	MF	KSA	Abdullah Al-Khaibari
18	DF	BRA	Maicon
19	MF	KSA	Ali Al-Hassan
21	MF	KSA	Mukhtar Ali
23	MF	KSA	Ayman Yahya
24	MF	KSA	Khalid Al-Ghannam

No.	Pos.	Nation	Player
27	DF	KSA	Osama Al-Khalaf
28	DF	KOR	Kim Jin-su
33	GK	KSA	Waleed Abdullah
39	MF	KSA	Abdulrahman Al-Dawsari
42	FW	KSA	Firas Al-Buraikan
44	GK	KSA	Nawaf Al-Aqidi
45	MF	KSA	Abdulfattah Asiri
50	DF	KSA	Abdulaziz Al-Alawi
52	FW	KSA	Khalil Al Absi
53	MF	KSA	Sultan Al-Anazi
54	MF	KSA	Basel Al-Sayali
55	DF	KSA	Abdullah Al-Shanqiti
56	FW	KSA	Mohammed Marran
57	GK	KSA	Raed Ozaybi
70	FW	KSA	Raed Al-Ghamdi (on loan from Al-Raed)
78	DF	KSA	Ali Lajami
88	MF	KSA	Yahya Al-Shehri

=== Out on loan ===
Note: Flags indicate national team as defined under FIFA eligibility rules; some limited exceptions apply. Players may hold more than one non-FIFA nationality.

No.	Pos.	Nation	Player
12	DF	KSA	Mohammed Al-Shanqiti (at Al-Tai until 30 June 2021)
20	DF	KSA	Hamad Al Mansor (at Al-Ittihad until 30 June 2021)
25	GK	KSA	Amin Bukhari (at Al-Ain until 30 June 2021)
29	FW	KSA	Abdulfattah Adam (at Al-Raed until 30 June 2021)
32	MF	KSA	Saud Zidan (at Abha until 30 June 2021)
34	DF	KSA	Abdulmajeed Al Abbas (at Al-Jabalain until 30 June 2021)
35	DF	KSA	Khaled Al-Showaie (at Al-Jabalain until 30 June 2021)
37	DF	KSA	Naif Almas (at Al-Batin until 30 June 2021)
38	MF	KSA	Fahad Al-Jumeiah (at Abha until 30 June 2021)
41	GK	KSA	Waleed Al-Enezi (at Al-Nojoom until 30 June 2021)
43	GK	KSA	Saleh Al-Ohaymid (at Al-Ain until 30 June 2021)

No.	Pos.	Nation	Player
46	MF	KSA	Khalid Al-Ghwinem (at Al-Thoqbah until 30 June 2021)
48	DF	KSA	Mansour Al-Shammari (at Al-Tai until 30 June 2021)
90	FW	KSA	Muteb Al-Hammad (at Al-Thoqbah until 30 June 2021)
98	MF	KSA	Abdulrahman Al-Shanar (at Al-Sahel until 30 June 2021)
—	GK	KSA	Abdulrahman Al-Shammari (at Najran until 30 June 2021)
—	DF	KSA	Osama Al-Bawardi (at Al-Diriyah until 30 June 2021)
—	DF	KSA	Abdulkareem Al-Muziel (at Al-Taawoun until 30 June 2021)
—	MF	KSA	Nawaf Al-Farshan (at Al-Ain until 30 June 2021)
—	MF	KSA	Mohammed Al-Shahrani (at Al-Adalah until 30 June 2021)
—	MF	YEM	Ali Yahya (at Al-Riyadh until 30 June 2021)
—	FW	KSA	Saleh Al Abbas (at Al-Batin until 30 June 2021)

== Transfers and loans ==
=== Transfers in ===
Entry date	Position	No.	Player	From club	Fee	Ref.
9 September 2020	GK	25	(Saudi Arabia) Amin Bukhari	(Saudi Arabia) Al-Ittihad	Free	
9 September 2020	GK	26	(Saudi Arabia) Abdullah Al-Owaishir	(Saudi Arabia) Al-Shabab	End of loan	
9 September 2020	DF	18	(Brazil) Maicon	(Turkey) Galatasaray	$1,685,000	
9 September 2020	DF	27	(Saudi Arabia) Osama Al-Khalaf	(Saudi Arabia) Al-Hazem	$1,333,000	
9 September 2020	DF	50	(Saudi Arabia) Abdulaziz Al-Alawi	(Saudi Arabia) Ohod	Free	
9 September 2020	DF	78	(Saudi Arabia) Ali Lajami	(Saudi Arabia) Al-Fateh	$6,665,000	
9 September 2020	MF	8	(Saudi Arabia) Abdulmajeed Al-Sulayhem	(Saudi Arabia) Al-Shabab	Free	
9 September 2020	MF	10	(Argentina) Pity Martínez	(United States) Atlanta United	$18,000,000	
9 September 2020	MF	14	(Saudi Arabia) Sami Al-Najei	(Saudi Arabia) Damac	End of loan	
9 September 2020	MF	45	(Saudi Arabia) Abdulfattah Asiri	(Saudi Arabia) Al-Ahli	$1,333,000	
3 October 2020	GK	41	(Saudi Arabia) Waleed Al-Enezi	(Saudi Arabia) Al-Nojoom	End of loan	
3 October 2020	DF	12	(Saudi Arabia) Mohammed Al-Shanqiti	(Saudi Arabia) Al-Tai	End of loan	
3 October 2020	DF	28	(South Korea) Kim Jin-su	(South Korea) Jeonbuk Hyundai Motors	$500,000	
3 October 2020	DF	35	(Saudi Arabia) Khaled Al-Showaie	(Saudi Arabia) Al-Tai	End of loan	
3 October 2020	DF	55	(Saudi Arabia) Abdullah Al-Shanqiti	(Saudi Arabia) Al-Ansar	$267,000	
3 October 2020	DF	–	(Saudi Arabia) Osama Al-Bawardi	(Saudi Arabia) Al-Jabalain	End of loan	
3 October 2020	DF	–	(Saudi Arabia) Khalid Al-Dubaysh	(Saudi Arabia) Al-Adalah	End of loan	
3 October 2020	MF	32	(Saudi Arabia) Saud Zidan	(Saudi Arabia) Al-Jabalain	End of loan	
3 October 2020	MF	53	(Saudi Arabia) Sultan Al-Anazi	(Saudi Arabia) Al-Qaisumah	$106,000	
3 October 2020	MF	98	(Saudi Arabia) Abdulrahman Al-Shanar	(Saudi Arabia) Al-Kawkab	End of loan	
3 October 2020	MF	–	(Saudi Arabia) Abdulrahman Al-Dhefiri	(Saudi Arabia) Al-Khaleej	End of loan	
3 October 2020	MF	–	(Saudi Arabia) Nawaf Al-Farshan	(Saudi Arabia) Al-Hazem	End of loan	
3 October 2020	MF	–	(Saudi Arabia) Faraj Al-Ghashayan	(Saudi Arabia) Al-Qadsiah	End of loan	
3 October 2020	MF	–	(Saudi Arabia) Mohammed Al-Shahrani	(Saudi Arabia) Damac	End of loan	
3 October 2020	MF	–	(Saudi Arabia) Rakan Al-Shamlan	(Saudi Arabia) Al-Wehda	End of loan	
3 October 2020	FW	90	(Saudi Arabia) Muteb Al-Hammad	(Saudi Arabia) Al-Kawkab	End of loan	
3 October 2020	FW	–	(Saudi Arabia) Saleh Al Abbas	(Saudi Arabia) Abha	End of loan	
5 October 2020	MF	19	(Saudi Arabia) Ali Al-Hassan	(Saudi Arabia) Al-Fateh	$6,665,000	

=== Loans in ===
Start date	End date	Position	No.	Player	From club	Fee	Ref.
25 October 2020	End of season	FW	70	(Saudi Arabia) Raed Al-Ghamdi	(Saudi Arabia) Al-Raed	$267,000	

=== Transfers out ===
Exit date	Position	No.	Player	To club	Fee	Ref.
3 October 2020	GK	31	(Saudi Arabia) Zaid Al-Bawardi	(Saudi Arabia) Al-Shabab	Free	
3 October 2020	DF	–	(Saudi Arabia) Khalid Al-Dubaysh	(Saudi Arabia) Al-Shabab	Free	
3 October 2020	MF	27	(Saudi Arabia) Awadh Khamis	(Saudi Arabia) Al-Raed	Free	
3 October 2020	MF	–	(Saudi Arabia) Abdulrahman Al-Dhefiri	(Saudi Arabia) Al-Hazem	Free	
5 October 2020	MF	10	(Brazil) Giuliano	(Turkey) İstanbul Başakşehir	Free	
8 October 2020	MF	–	(Saudi Arabia) Rakan Al-Shamlan	(Saudi Arabia) Al-Batin	Undisclosed	
16 October 2020	GK	26	(Saudi Arabia) Abdullah Al-Owaishir	(Saudi Arabia) Al-Wehda	Free	
18 October 2020	DF	4	(Saudi Arabia) Omar Hawsawi	(Saudi Arabia) Al-Ittihad	Free	
21 October 2020	MF	16	(Saudi Arabia) Abdulaziz Al-Jebreen	(Saudi Arabia) Al-Ittihad	Free	
22 October 2020	DF	–	(Saudi Arabia) Ahmad Akash	(Saudi Arabia) Al-Kawkab	Free	

=== Loans out ===
Start date	End date	Position	No.	Player	To club	Fee	Ref.
7 October 2020	End of season	GK	43	(Saudi Arabia) Saleh Al-Ohaymid	(Saudi Arabia) Al-Ain	None	
7 October 2020	End of season	FW	–	(Saudi Arabia) Saleh Al Abbas	(Saudi Arabia) Al-Batin	$345,000	
10 October 2020	End of season	DF	35	(Saudi Arabia) Khaled Al-Showaie	(Saudi Arabia) Al-Jabalain	None	
10 October 2020	End of season	MF	32	(Saudi Arabia) Saud Zidan	(Saudi Arabia) Abha	None	
12 October 2020	End of season	DF	37	(Saudi Arabia) Naif Almas	(Saudi Arabia) Al-Batin	None	
12 October 2020	End of season	DF	–	(Saudi Arabia) Osama Al-Bawardi	(Saudi Arabia) Al-Diriyah	None	
12 October 2020	End of season	DF	–	(Saudi Arabia) Mohammed Al-Shanqiti	(Saudi Arabia) Al-Tai	None	
13 October 2020	End of season	MF	38	(Saudi Arabia) Fahad Al-Jumeiah	(Saudi Arabia) Abha	None	
14 October 2020	End of season	MF	–	(Saudi Arabia) Nawaf Al-Farshan	(Saudi Arabia) Al-Ain	None	
15 October 2020	End of season	DF	48	(Saudi Arabia) Mansour Al-Shammari	(Saudi Arabia) Al-Tai	None	
15 October 2020	15 February 2021	MF	46	(Saudi Arabia) Khalid Al-Ghwinem	(Saudi Arabia) Al-Tai	None	
16 October 2020	End of season	GK	25	(Saudi Arabia) Amin Bukhari	(Saudi Arabia) Al-Ain	None	
19 October 2020	End of season	DF	34	(Saudi Arabia) Abdulmajeed Abbas	(Saudi Arabia) Al-Jabalain	None	
20 October 2020	End of season	GK	41	(Saudi Arabia) Waleed Al-Enezi	(Saudi Arabia) Al-Nojoom	None	
22 October 2020	End of season	DF	20	(Saudi Arabia) Hamad Al Mansor	(Saudi Arabia) Al-Ittihad	None	
24 October 2020	End of season	MF	–	(Yemen) Ali Yahya	(Saudi Arabia) Al-Riyadh	None	
25 October 2020	End of season	FW	29	(Saudi Arabia) Abdulfattah Adam	(Saudi Arabia) Al-Raed	None	
26 October 2020	End of season	DF	–	(Saudi Arabia) Abdulkareem Al-Muziel	(Saudi Arabia) Al-Taawoun	None	
26 October 2020	End of season	MF	–	(Saudi Arabia) Mohammed Al-Shahrani	(Saudi Arabia) Al-Adalah	None	
31 October 2020	End of season	MF	98	(Saudi Arabia) Abdulrahman Al-Shanar	(Saudi Arabia) Al-Diriyah	None	
9 January 2021	End of season	GK	–	(Saudi Arabia) Abdulrahman Al-Shammari	(Saudi Arabia) Najran	None	
15 February 2021	End of season	MF	46	(Saudi Arabia) Khalid Al-Ghwinem	(Saudi Arabia) Al-Thoqbah	None	

== Competitions ==
=== Overview ===
Competition	Record							
Competition	G	W	D	L	GF	GA	GD	Win %
Pro League	30	13	7	10	53	40	+13	43.33
King Cup	3	2	0	1	5	1	+4	66.67
Super Cup	1	1	0	0	3	0	+3	100.00
Champions League	6	3	2	1	9	5	+4	50.00
Total	40	19	9	12	70	46	+24	47.50

Updated to match played 30 May 2021
Source: Competitions

=== Pro League ===
==== League table ====
Pos	Team	Pld	W	D	L	GF	GA	GD	Pts	Qualification or relegation
4	Al-Taawoun	30	13	8	9	42	30	+12	47 (Note: Positions determined by head-to-head points: Al-Taawoun 4 pts; Al-Ettifaq 1 pt.)	Qualification for AFC Champions League play-off round
5	Al-Ettifaq	30	14	5	11	50	48	+2	47	
6	Al-Nassr	30	13	7	10	53	40	+13	46	
7	Al-Fateh	30	12	6	12	55	55	0	42	
8	Al-Ahli	30	11	6	13	44	56	−12	39	

Source: spl.com source=إحصائيات رابطة دوري المحترفين السعودي 2020-2021
Rules for classification: 1) Points; 2) Head-to-head points; 3) Head-to-head goal difference; 4) Total goal difference; 5) Total goals scored; 6) Fair-play points (Note: Head-to-head record is used only after all the matches between the teams in question have been played).

==== Results summary ====
Overall								Home						Away					
Pld	W	D	L	GF	GA	GD	Pts	W	D	L	GF	GA	GD	W	D	L	GF	GA	GD
30	13	7	10	53	40	+13	46	8	3	4	35	21	+14	5	4	6	18	19	−1

Last updated: 30 May 2021.
Source: spl.com.sa

==== Results by round ====
Round	1	2	3	4	5	6	7	8	9	10	11	12	13	14	15	16	17	18	19	20	21	22	23	24	25	26	27	28	29	30
Ground	H	A	A	H	A	A	H	H	A	H	A	H	A	H	A	A	H	H	A	H	H	A	A	H	A	H	A	H	A	H
Result	L	L	L	W	L	L	D	L	W	D	W	W	W	W	D	D	W	L	L	W	D	D	W	W	L	W	W	W	D	L
Position	11	14	14	13	15	15	15	15	15	15	14	11	10	7	6	7	6	7	9	8	7	7	6	5	5	6	5	5	5	6

Updated to match(es) played on 30 May 2021. Source: spl.com.sa
A = Away; H = Home; W = Win; D = Draw; L = Loss

==== Matches ====
All times are local, AST (UTC+3).

Win Draw Loss Postponed

18 October 2020 1	Al-Nassr	1–2	Al-Fateh	Riyadh
18:00	Adam (yellow card) 7'; Kim Jin-su (yellow card) 41'; K. Al-Ghannam 53'; Al-Buraikan (yellow card) 81'	Report	Bendebka 12', 63'	Stadium: Prince Faisal bin Fahd Stadium; Attendance: 0 Referee: Majed Al-Shamrani

22 October 2020 2	Al-Taawoun	1–0	Al-Nassr	Buraidah
18:05	Al-Mousa (red card) 9'; Santos (yellow card) 21'; Amissi (yellow card) 45+1'; Tawamba 63'	Report	Al-Hassan (yellow card) 48'; Yahya (yellow card) 51'; Al-Alawi (yellow card) 86'	Stadium: King Abdullah Sport City Stadium; Attendance: 0 Referee: Mohammed Al-Hoaish

1 November 2020 3	Al-Shabab	2–1	Al-Nassr	Riyadh
19:50	Banega (yellow card) 26', (goal) 90+7' (pen.); Martins (yellow card) 37'; Sharahili 55', (yellow card) 82'	Report	Yahya 61'; Petros (yellow card) 77'	Stadium: Prince Faisal bin Fahd Stadium; Attendance: 0 Referee: Shukri Al-Hanfoush

7 November 2020 4	Al-Nassr	2–0	Al-Qadsiah	Riyadh
19:45	Al-Khalaf (yellow card) 38'; Al-Amri 47'; Al-Buraikan 65'; Ali (yellow card) 73'	Report	Edson (yellow card) 17'; Stanley (yellow card) 24'; Al-Yami (yellow card) 32'	Stadium: Prince Faisal bin Fahd Stadium; Attendance: 0 Referee: Turki Al-Khudhayr

23 November 2020 5	Al-Hilal	2–0	Al-Nassr	Riyadh
20:15	Cuéllar (yellow card) 45+1'; Gomis 60' (pen.); Vietto (yellow card) 63'; Al-Bulaihi (yellow card) 71'; Kanno (yellow card) 90+4'; Al-Breik (yellow card) 90+6'; Al-Shehri 90+8'	Report	S. Al-Ghanam (yellow card) 29'; Maicon (yellow card) 58'; Al-Obaid (yellow card) 88'; Al-Amri (yellow card) 90+3'	Stadium: King Fahd International Stadium; Attendance: 0 Referee: Andrés Cunha (Uruguay)

3 December 2020 6	Abha	2–1	Al-Nassr	Abha
15:35	Al-Jumeiah (yellow card) 4'; Strandberg 55', 69'	Report	Yahya 19'; Amrabat (yellow card) 31'; S. Al-Ghanam (yellow card) 45+4'	Stadium: Prince Sultan bin Abdul Aziz Stadium; Attendance: 0 Referee: Majed Al-Shamrani

7 December 2020 7	Al-Nassr	2–2	Al-Ettifaq	Riyadh
19:45	Maicon (yellow card) 45+8'; Kim Jin-su (yellow card) 53'; Al-Najei 89'; Hamdallah 90+10' (pen.)	Report	Al-Khateeb (yellow card) 7'; Kiss 45+9' (pen.), (yellow card) 59'; Sliti (yellow card) 49', (goal) 51'; M'Bolhi (yellow card) 90+2'; Al-Kwikbi (yellow card) 90+3'	Stadium: King Fahd International Stadium; Attendance: 0 Referee: Mohammed Al-Nuhait

12 December 2020 8	Al-Nassr	1–2	Al-Ahli	Riyadh
19:45	Yahya 39'	Report	Fettouhi 38', 89' (pen.); Hassoun (yellow card) 45+3'; Al-Moasher (yellow card) 58'; Hawsawi (yellow card) 72'; Al-Asmari (yellow card) 90+6'	Stadium: King Fahd International Stadium; Attendance: 0 Referee: Turki Al-Khudhayr

21 December 2020 9	Al-Batin	1–2	Al-Nassr	Hafar al-Batin
15:10	Al-Owdah (yellow card) 72'; Abreu 90+4'	Report	Maicon (yellow card) 25'; K. Al-Ghannam 86'; Amrabat 90+1' (pen.)	Stadium: Al-Batin Club Stadium; Attendance: 0 Referee: Sultan Al-Harbi

26 December 2020 10	Al-Nassr	2–2	Damac	Riyadh
17:50	Petros 10', 45+3'; Madu (yellow card) 19'; Al-Hassan (yellow card) 73'	Report	Fallatah (yellow card) 17'; Vittor 36'; Maicon 48' (o.g.); Sharahili (yellow card) 50'; Zelaya (yellow card) 79'	Stadium: Mrsool Park; Attendance: 0 Referee: Abdullah Al-Harbi

31 December 2020 11	Al-Faisaly	2–3	Al-Nassr	Al Majma'ah
17:55	Al-Saiari (yellow card) 35'; Silva (yellow card) 49'; Tavares 69', 85' (pen.)	Report	Petros (yellow card) 14'; Amrabat 25'; S. Al-Ghanam 40'; Maicon (yellow card) 80'; Al-Obaid (yellow card) 80'; Al-Ghamdi 86'	Stadium: Al Majma'ah Sports City; Attendance: 0 Referee: Faisal Al-Blwi

8 January 2021 12	Al-Nassr	3–0	Al-Ain	Riyadh
19:55	K. Al-Ghannam 46'; Amrabat (yellow card) 73'; Martínez 80'; Al-Najei 82'	Report	Bradarić (yellow card) 27'; Al-Qeshtah (yellow card) 77'; Getterson (yellow card) 84'; Kabi (yellow card) 85'	Stadium: King Fahd International Stadium; Attendance: 0 Referee: Mohammed Al-Nuhait

15 January 2021 13	Al-Raed	0–1	Al-Nassr	Buraidah
18:10	Baalghyth (yellow card) 55'; Miletić (yellow card) 68'; Fouzair (yellow card) 72'; Daoudi (yellow card) 74'; Al-Zain (yellow card) 79'; Al-Khathlan (yellow card) 87'	Report	Al-Sulayhem 83'	Stadium: King Abdullah Sport City Stadium; Attendance: 0 Referee: Mohammed Al-Hoaish

20 January 2021 14	Al-Nassr	3–1	Al-Wehda	Riyadh
20:10	Martínez 8'; Al-Ghamdi (yellow card) 19'; Al-Sulayhem (yellow card) 56'; Petros 67', 87' (pen.); Al-Buraikan (yellow card) 90+3'	Report	Luisinho 5'; Anselmo (yellow card) 19'; Al-Hafith (yellow card) 47'; Bakshween (yellow card) 70'; Niakaté (yellow card) 77'; Botía (yellow card) 82'; Fortes (yellow card) 86'; Abdu Jaber (yellow card) 89'	Stadium: Mrsool Park; Attendance: 0 Referee: Majed Al-Shamrani

24 January 2021 15	Al-Ittihad	1–1	Al-Nassr	Mecca
20:10	Al-Malki (yellow card) 59'; Al-Bishi (yellow card) 89'; Romarinho 90+3'	Report	K. Al-Ghannam 63'; Al-Ghamdi (yellow card) 74'; Al-Khalaf (yellow card) 78'; Petros (yellow card) 86'	Stadium: King Abdul Aziz Stadium; Attendance: 0 Referee: Khaled Salwi

4 February 2021 17	Al-Nassr	3–0	Al-Taawoun	Riyadh
20:15	Lajami (yellow card) 9'; Al-Najei 40'; Petros (yellow card) 49'; Hamdallah 59' (pen.); Amrabat (yellow card) 68'; Al-Sulayhem 90+4'; Al-Khaibari (yellow card) 90+7'	Report	Amissi (yellow card) 35'; Sandro (yellow card) 45'; Al-Nemer (yellow card) 50'; Al-Mousa (yellow card) 90+2'; Assiri (yellow card) 90+2'	Stadium: Mrsool Park; Attendance: 0 Referee: Sultan Al-Harbi

9 February 2021 16	Al-Fateh	1–1	Al-Nassr	Al-Hasa
18:10	Bendebka (yellow card) 22'; Al-Hassan 89' (o.g.); Koval (yellow card) 90+6'	Report	Al-Hassan (yellow card) 34'; Yahya (yellow card) 90'; Hamdallah 90+7' (pen.)	Stadium: Prince Abdullah bin Jalawi Stadium; Attendance: 0 Referee: Khaled Al-Teris

13 February 2021 18	Al-Nassr	0–4	Al-Shabab	Riyadh
20:20	Martínez (yellow card) 22'; Hamdallah (yellow card) 33'; Petros (yellow card) 35'; Amrabat (yellow card) 73'	Report	Banega 17' (pen.); Guanca 28', 82'; Martins (yellow card) 42'; Al-Qahtani (yellow card) 72'; Al-Bawardi (yellow card) 79'; Tambakti (yellow card) 88'; N'Diaye (yellow card) 90'; Ighalo 90+2'	Stadium: Mrsool Park; Attendance: 0 Referee: Turki Al-Khudhayr

18 February 2021 19	Al-Qadsiah	1–0	Al-Nassr	Khobar
18:10	Al-Shoeil (yellow card) 8'; Edson (yellow card) 17', (goal) 23'; Andria (yellow card) 30'; Williams (yellow card) 52'; Abdi (yellow card) 83'; Masrahi (yellow card) 86'; Al-Yami (yellow card) 90+2' (yellow-red card) 90+6'	Report	Lajami (yellow card) 90+5'	Stadium: Prince Saud bin Jalawi Stadium; Attendance: 0 Referee: Faisal Al-Blwi

23 February 2021 20	Al-Nassr	1–0	Al-Hilal	Riyadh
20:35	Martínez 21', (yellow card) 62'; Amrabat (yellow card) 40'; Petros (yellow card) 66'; Jones (yellow card) 85'; Yahya (yellow card) 90+1'	Report	N. Al-Dawsari (yellow card) 32'; Cuéllar (yellow card) 40'; Gomis (yellow card) 65'; Al-Shahrani (yellow card) 73'; S. Al-Dawsari (yellow card) 77'; Al-Bulaihi (yellow card) 88'	Stadium: Mrsool Park; Attendance: 0 Referee: Esteban Ostojich (Uruguay)

28 February 2021 21	Al-Nassr	2–2	Abha	Riyadh
20:30	Al-Najei 61', 90+3', (yellow card) 78'; Madu (yellow card) 83'	Report	Strandberg 11', 74'; Atouchi (yellow card) 77'	Stadium: Mrsool Park; Attendance: 0 Referee: Mohammed Al-Hoaish

5 March 2021 22	Al-Ettifaq	1–1	Al-Nassr	Dammam
18:20	Azaro 3'; Hazazi (yellow card) 18' (yellow-red card) 27'; Souza (yellow card) 70'	Report	Al-Amri (yellow card) 38', (goal) 58'; Madu (yellow card) 54'; Martínez (yellow card) 90'; Abdullah (yellow card) 90+6'	Stadium: Prince Mohamed bin Fahd Stadium; Attendance: 0 Referee: Majed Al-Shamrani

11 March 2021 23	Al-Ahli	1–2	Al-Nassr	Jeddah
20:45	Al Somah 58'; Fettouhi (yellow card) 67'	Report	Martínez (yellow card) 32'; Al-Amri 41'; Petros (yellow card) 43'; Hamdallah 85'; Al-Ghamdi (yellow card) 89'	Stadium: King Abdullah Sports City Reserve Stadium; Attendance: 0 Referee: Khaled Al-Teris

20 March 2021 24	Al-Nassr	7–0	Al-Batin	Riyadh
20:45	Lajami 13'; Amrabat 49'; Al-Qarni 52' (o.g.); Hamdallah 58', 63' (pen.); Petros 68'; Al-Hassan (yellow card) 74'; Al-Ghamdi 79'; Al-Amri (yellow card) 87'	Report	Al-Rubaie (yellow card) 62'; Almas (yellow card) 71'; Campaña (yellow card) 72'	Stadium: Mrsool Park; Attendance: 0 Referee: Mohammed Al-Nuhait

9 April 2021 25	Damac	3–2	Al-Nassr	Abha
19:05	Pellegrino 7', 62'; Zelaya 56'; Munshi (yellow card) 70' (yellow-red card) 76'	Report	Asiri 51'; Al-Obaid 54', (yellow card) 62'; Maran (yellow card) 90'	Stadium: Prince Sultan bin Abdul Aziz Stadium; Attendance: 0 Referee: Abdullah Al-Harbi

5 May 2021 26	Al-Nassr	4–3	Al-Faisaly	Riyadh
21:40	Amrabat 1', 49' (pen.), (yellow card) 20'; Al-Najei 15', (yellow card) 80'; Petros 40'; Maran (yellow card) 85' (yellow-red card) 90+7'; Abdullah (yellow card) 90+3'; S. Al-Ghanam (yellow card) 90+6'	Report	Guilherme 12'; Faik 27'; Merkel (yellow card) 45'; Silva 88'; Majrashi (yellow card) 90'; H. Qassem (yellow card) 90+7'	Stadium: Mrsool Park; Attendance: 0 Referee: Ahmad Al-Rumaikhani

14 May 2021 27	Al-Ain	0–2	Al-Nassr	Al Bahah
19:20	Al-Sohaymi (yellow card) 32'; Al-Harbi (yellow card) 53'	Report	Hamdallah 45' (pen.); Amrabat (yellow card) 45+3' (yellow-red card) 76', (goal) 67'; Ar. Al-Dawsari (red card) 89'	Stadium: King Saud Sport City Stadium; Attendance: 0 Referee: Abdullah Al-Shehri

20 May 2021 28	Al-Nassr	3–1	Al-Raed	Riyadh
21:00	Al-Buraikan 59'; Abdullah (yellow card) 65'; Hamdallah 75', 88'; S. Al-Ghanam (yellow card) 84'	Report	Djoum (yellow card) 13', (goal) 29'; El Berkaoui (yellow card) 45+2'; Issa (yellow card) 73'	Stadium: Mrsool Park; Attendance: 7,525; Referee: Majed Al-Shamrani

25 May 2021 29	Al-Wehda	1–1	Al-Nassr	Mecca
21:00	Al-Jayzani (yellow card) 20'; Luisinho (yellow card) 30'; Petratos 45+2' (pen.); Bakshween (yellow card) 55'; Anselmo (yellow card) 81'; Al-Eisa (yellow card) 88'; Botía (red card) 90+4'; Al-Zubaidi (yellow card) 90+7'	Report	Abdullah (yellow card) 45'; Hamdallah (yellow card) 45+1', (goal) 90' (pen.); Al-Obaid (yellow card) 82'	Stadium: King Abdul Aziz Stadium; Attendance: 2,596; Referee: Abdullah Al-Harbi

30 May 2021 30	Al-Nassr	1–2	Al-Ittihad	Riyadh
21:00	Hamdallah 27' (pen.), (yellow card) 50'; Madu (yellow card) 45+4'; Petros (yellow card) 48'; Al-Khaibari (yellow card) 60'	Report	Romarinho 19'; Al-Malki (yellow card) 52'; Al-Shamrani (yellow card) 68'; Al-Bishi 78', (yellow card) 88'; Al-Aboud (yellow card) 86' (yellow-red card) 90+4'	Stadium: Mrsool Park; Attendance: 7,960; Referee: Turki Al-Khudhayr

=== King Cup ===
All times are local, AST (UTC+3).

16 December 2020 Round of 16	Al-Nassr	2–0	Al-Raed	Riyadh
20:20	Yahya 21', (yellow card) 30'; Martínez (yellow card) 27'; Al-Najei 67'; Al-Ghannam (yellow card) 71'; Maicon (yellow card) 76'; Petros (yellow card) 79'	Report	Daoudi (yellow card) 77'	Stadium: King Fahd International Stadium; Attendance: 0 Referee: Raed Al-Zahrani

16 March 2021 Quarter-finals	Al-Nassr	3–0	Al-Ain	Riyadh
18:40	Al-Hassan (yellow card) 38'; Hamdallah 45+4'; Amrabat 72'; Al-Najei 83'	Report	Ndiaye (yellow card) 25'; Al-Khaibari (yellow card) 35'; Bradarić (yellow card) 45+6'; Moutari (yellow card) 47'; Getterson (yellow card) 74'; Juanpi (yellow card) 74'; Muath (yellow card) 78'	Stadium: Mrsool Park; Attendance: 0 Referee: Turki Al-Khudhayr

4 April 2021 Semi-finals	Al-Nassr	0–1	Al-Faisaly	Riyadh
21:00	Madu (yellow card) 68'; Hamdallah (yellow card) 79'; Al-Ghannam (yellow card) 85'	Report	Rossi (red card) 9'; Guilherme (yellow card) 45+4'; Tavares 81' (pen.); Al-Kassar (yellow card) 90+4'; Silva (yellow card) 90+7'	Stadium: Mrsool Park; Attendance: 0 Referee: Mohammed Al-Hoaish

=== Saudi Super Cup ===
All times are local, AST (UTC+3).

30 January 2021 Final	Al-Hilal	0–3	Al-Nassr	Riyadh
20:15	Al-Dawsari (yellow card) 64'; Vietto (yellow card) 67'	Report	Petros (yellow card) 52', (goal) 61'; Al-Ghannam (yellow card) 64'; Amrabat (yellow card) 75'; Hamdallah 82', (yellow card) 84'; Al-Najei 90+2', (yellow card) 90+3'	Stadium: King Fahd International Stadium; Attendance: 0 Referee: Daniele Orsato (Italy)

=== AFC Champions League ===
==== Group stage ====
Pos	Team	Pld	W	D	L	GF	GA	GD	Pts	Qualification	NAS	SAD	WEH	FOO
1	(Saudi Arabia) Al-Nassr (H)	6	3	2	1	9	5	+4	11	Advance to Round of 16	—	3–1	1–2	2–0
2	(Qatar) Al-Sadd	6	3	1	2	9	7	+2	10		1–2	—	3–1	1–1
3	(Jordan) Al-Wehdat	6	2	1	3	4	7	−3	7		0–0	0–2	—	1–0
4	(Iran) Foolad	6	1	2	3	3	6	−3	5		1–1	0–1	1–0	—

Source: AFC
Rules for classification: Tiebreakers
(H) Hosts

14 April 2021 1	Al-Wehdat (Jordan)	0–0	(Saudi Arabia) Al-Nassr	Riyadh, Saudi Arabia
21:00 UTC+3	Elias (yellow card) 87'	Report		Stadium: Mrsool Park; Attendance: 0 Referee: Omar Al-Yaqoubi (Oman)

17 April 2021 2	Al-Nassr (Saudi Arabia)	3–1	(Qatar) Al-Sadd	Riyadh, Saudi Arabia
21:00 UTC+3	Lajami (yellow card) 23'; Hamdallah 37'; Amrabat (yellow card) 57'; Al-Sulayhem 79'; Al-Ghannam 90+4'	Report	Ró-Ró (yellow card) 31'; Cazorla 59'; Abdurisag (yellow card) 63'	Stadium: Mrsool Park; Attendance: 0 Referee: Ali Sabah (Iraq)

20 April 2021 3	Foolad (Iran)	1–1	(Saudi Arabia) Al-Nassr	Riyadh, Saudi Arabia
21:00 UTC+3	Al-Amri 52' (o.g.); Hardani (yellow card) 87'	Report	Madu (yellow card) 32'; Al-Najei (yellow card) 54'; Hamdallah (yellow card) 58'; Petros 69'	Stadium: Mrsool Park; Attendance: 0 Referee: Ryuji Sato (Japan)

23 April 2021 4	Al-Nassr (Saudi Arabia)	2–0	(Iran) Foolad	Riyadh, Saudi Arabia
21:00 UTC+3	Asiri 54', (yellow card) 70'; Petros (yellow card) 62'; Hamdallah 85'; Amrabat (yellow card) 87'	Report	Abshak (yellow card) 2'; Ebrahimi (yellow card) 57'	Stadium: Mrsool Park; Attendance: 0 Referee: Mohanad Qasim (Iraq)

26 April 2021 5	Al-Nassr (Saudi Arabia)	1–2	(Jordan) Al-Wehdat	Riyadh, Saudi Arabia
21:00 UTC+3	Al-Amri (yellow card) 53'; Al-Najei (yellow card) 60'; Hamdallah 90+5' (pen.)	Report	Zreik 44'; Essam (yellow card) 55'; Al-Fakhouri (yellow card) 65'; N'Diaye 72'; Khattab (yellow card) 75'; Awad (yellow card) 80'	Stadium: Mrsool Park; Attendance: 0 Referee: Ali Abdulnabi (Bahrain)

29 April 2021 6	Al-Sadd (Qatar)	1–2	(Saudi Arabia) Al-Nassr	Riyadh, Saudi Arabia
21:00 UTC+3	Guilherme (yellow card) 29'; Al-Haydos (yellow card) 29'; Bounedjah (yellow card) 45+3'; Khoukhi (yellow card) 61'; Al-Hajri (yellow card) 78'; Cazorla 83' (pen.); Hassan (yellow card) 90+7'	Report	Hamdallah 33', (yellow card) 90+7'; Madu (yellow card) 50'; Amrabat (yellow card) 73'; Al-Amri 74'; Lajami (yellow card) 81'; S. Al-Ghanam (yellow card) 88'	Stadium: Mrsool Park; Attendance: 0 Referee: Masoud Tufayelieh (Syria)

== Statistics ==
=== Appearances ===
Last updated on 30 May 2021.

No.	Pos	Nat	Player	Total		Pro League		King Cup		Super Cup		Champions League	
No.	Pos	Nat	Player	Apps	Goals	Apps	Goals	Apps	Goals	Apps	Goals	Apps	Goals
Goalkeepers
1	GK	(Australia) AUS	Brad Jones	30	0	24	0	3	0	1	0	2	0
33	GK	(Saudi Arabia) KSA	Waleed Abdullah	10	0	6	0	0	0	0	0	4	0
44	GK	(Saudi Arabia) KSA	Nawaf Al-Aqidi	0	0	0	0	0	0	0	0	0	0
57	GK	(Saudi Arabia) KSA	Raed Ozaybi	0	0	0	0	0	0	0	0	0	0
Defenders
2	DF	(Saudi Arabia) KSA	Sultan Al-Ghanam	35	1	24+1	1	3	0	1	0	6	0
3	DF	(Saudi Arabia) KSA	Abdullah Madu	28	0	17+2	0	3	0	1	0	5	0
5	DF	(Saudi Arabia) KSA	Abdulelah Al-Amri	31	4	20+2	3	2	0	1	0	6	1
13	DF	(Saudi Arabia) KSA	Abdulrahman Al-Obaid	23	1	17+3	1	2	0	0	0	1	0
18	DF	(Brazil) BRA	Maicon	19	0	16+2	0	1	0	0	0	0	0
27	DF	(Saudi Arabia) KSA	Osama Al-Khalaf	16	0	8+6	0	0+1	0	1	0	0	0
28	DF	(South Korea) KOR	Kim Jin-su	8	0	7	0	1	0	0	0	0	0
50	DF	(Saudi Arabia) KSA	Abdulaziz Al-Alawi	4	0	2+2	0	0	0	0	0	0	0
55	DF	(Saudi Arabia) KSA	Abdullah Al-Shanqiti	0	0	0	0	0	0	0	0	0	0
78	DF	(Saudi Arabia) KSA	Ali Lajami	18	1	10+1	1	0+1	0	0+1	0	5	0
Midfielders
6	MF	(Brazil) BRA	Petros	36	8	26	6	3	0	1	1	6	1
8	MF	(Saudi Arabia) KSA	Abdulmajeed Al-Sulayhem	26	3	14+5	2	2	0	1	0	2+2	1
10	MF	(Argentina) ARG	Pity Martínez	20	3	18	3	1	0	0+1	0	0	0
11	MF	(Morocco) MAR	Nordin Amrabat	34	7	22+3	6	3	1	1	0	5	0
14	MF	(Saudi Arabia) KSA	Sami Al-Najei	35	9	13+13	6	0+3	2	0+1	1	4+1	0
15	MF	(Saudi Arabia) KSA	Abdullaziz Al-Dawsari	9	0	1+4	0	0	0	0	0	0+4	0
17	MF	(Saudi Arabia) KSA	Abdullah Al-Khaibari	23	0	11+6	0	1+1	0	0+1	0	2+1	0
19	MF	(Saudi Arabia) KSA	Ali Al-Hassan	35	0	18+8	0	2	0	1	0	5+1	0
21	MF	(Saudi Arabia) KSA	Mukhtar Ali	8	0	4+1	0	0+1	0	0	0	0+2	0
23	MF	(Saudi Arabia) KSA	Ayman Yahya	16	4	8+7	3	1	1	0	0	0	0
24	MF	(Saudi Arabia) KSA	Khalid Al-Ghannam	33	5	16+8	4	0+2	0	1	0	2+4	1
39	MF	(Saudi Arabia) KSA	Abdulrahman Al-Dawsari	6	0	0+5	0	0	0	0	0	0+1	0
45	MF	(Saudi Arabia) KSA	Abdulfattah Asiri	15	2	2+5	1	2+1	0	0	0	5	1
53	MF	(Saudi Arabia) KSA	Sultan Al-Anazi	0	0	0	0	0	0	0	0	0	0
88	MF	(Saudi Arabia) KSA	Yahya Al-Shehri	4	0	1+2	0	0+1	0	0	0	0	0
Forwards
9	FW	(Morocco) MAR	Abderrazak Hamdallah	25	17	13+2	11	3	1	0+1	1	6	4
42	FW	(Saudi Arabia) KSA	Firas Al-Buraikan	15	2	2+12	2	0+1	0	0	0	0	0
52	FW	(Saudi Arabia) KSA	Khalil Al Absi	1	0	0+1	0	0	0	0	0	0	0
56	FW	(Saudi Arabia) KSA	Mohammed Marran	9	0	1+4	0	0	0	0	0	0+4	0
70	FW	(Saudi Arabia) KSA	Raed Al-Ghamdi	25	2	7+12	2	0+2	0	1	0	0+3	0
Players sent out on loan this season
29	FW	(Saudi Arabia) KSA	Abdulfattah Adam	2	0	1+1	0	0	0	0	0	0	0
Player who made an appearance this season but have left the club
7	FW	(Nigeria) NGA	Ahmed Musa	2	0	1+1	0	0	0	0	0	0	0

=== Goalscorers ===
Rank	No.	Pos	Nat	Name	Pro League	King Cup	Super Cup	Champions League	Total
1	9	FW	(Morocco)	Abderrazak Hamdallah	11	1	1	4	17
2	14	MF	(Saudi Arabia)	Sami Al-Najei	6	2	1	0	9
3	6	MF	(Brazil)	Petros	6	0	1	1	8
4	11	MF	(Morocco)	Nordin Amrabat	6	1	0	0	7
5	24	MF	(Saudi Arabia)	Khalid Al-Ghannam	4	0	0	1	5
6	5	DF	(Saudi Arabia)	Abdulelah Al-Amri	3	0	0	1	4
6	23	MF	(Saudi Arabia)	Ayman Yahya	3	1	0	0	4
7	8	MF	(Saudi Arabia)	Abdulmajeed Al-Sulayhem	2	0	0	1	3
7	10	MF	(Argentina)	Pity Martínez	3	0	0	0	3
10	42	FW	(Saudi Arabia)	Firas Al-Buraikan	2	0	0	0	2
10	45	MF	(Saudi Arabia)	Abdulfattah Asiri	1	0	0	1	2
10	70	FW	(Saudi Arabia)	Raed Al-Ghamdi	2	0	0	0	2
13	2	DF	(Saudi Arabia)	Sultan Al-Ghanam	1	0	0	0	1
13	13	DF	(Saudi Arabia)	Abdulrahman Al-Obaid	1	0	0	0	1
13	78	DF	(Saudi Arabia)	Ali Lajami	1	0	0	0	1
Own goal					1	0	0	0	1
Total					53	5	3	9	70

Last Updated: 30 May 2021

=== Assists ===
Rank	No.	Pos	Nat	Name	Pro League	King Cup	Super Cup	Champions League	Total
1	9	FW	(Morocco)	Abderrazak Hamdallah	2	1	1	2	6
1	10	MF	(Argentina)	Pity Martínez	6	0	0	0	6
1	14	MF	(Saudi Arabia)	Sami Al-Najei	5	0	0	1	6
4	6	MF	(Brazil)	Petros	3	0	0	1	4
4	23	MF	(Saudi Arabia)	Ayman Yahya	4	0	0	0	4
6	11	MF	(Morocco)	Nordin Amrabat	2	0	0	1	3
6	24	MF	(Saudi Arabia)	Khalid Al-Ghannam	2	1	0	0	3
8	2	DF	(Saudi Arabia)	Sultan Al-Ghanam	1	0	1	0	2
8	5	DF	(Saudi Arabia)	Abdulelah Al-Amri	2	0	0	0	2
8	8	MF	(Saudi Arabia)	Abdulmajeed Al-Sulayhem	1	0	1	0	2
8	70	FW	(Saudi Arabia)	Raed Al-Ghamdi	2	0	0	0	2
12	17	MF	(Saudi Arabia)	Abdullah Al-Khaibari	1	0	0	0	1
12	18	DF	(Brazil)	Maicon	1	0	0	0	1
12	19	MF	(Saudi Arabia)	Ali Al-Hassan	1	0	0	0	1
12	33	GK	(Saudi Arabia)	Waleed Abdullah	0	0	0	1	1
12	78	DF	(Saudi Arabia)	Ali Lajami	1	0	0	0	1
Total					34	2	3	6	45

Last Updated: 20 May 2021

=== Clean sheets ===
Rank	No.	Pos	Nat	Name	Pro League	King Cup	Super Cup	Champions League	Total
1	1	GK	(Australia)	Brad Jones	5	2	1	1	9
2	33	GK	(Saudi Arabia)	Waleed Abdullah	2	0	0	1	3
Total					7	2	1	2	12

Last Updated: 14 May 2021
