= 2020–21 Saudi Pro League =

Season of the Saudi Professional League

Saudi Pro League
- Season: 2020–21
- Dates: 17 October 2020 – 30 May 2021
- Champions: Al-Hilal (17th title)
- Relegated: Al-Qadsiah; Al-Wehda; Al-Ain
- AFC Champions League: Al-Hilal; Al-Faisaly; Al-Shabab; Al-Taawoun
- Matches: 240
- Goals: 746 (3.11 per match)
- Top goalscorer: Bafétimbi Gomis (24 goals)
- Best goalkeeper: Cássio (11 clean sheets)
- Biggest home win: Al-Nassr 7–0 Al-Batin (20 March 2021)
- Biggest away win: Al-Ain 0–5 Al-Hilal (9 February 2021)
- Highest scoring: Al-Ain 3–4 Al-Ahli (7 November 2020); Damac 4–3 Al-Ahli (5 December 2020); Al-Fateh 2–5 Al-Hilal (28 February 2020); Al-Nassr 7–0 Al-Batin (20 March 2021); Abha 3–4 Damac (21 March 2021); Al-Taawoun 3–4 Al-Fateh (25 April 2021); Al-Ettifaq 4–3 Al-Shabab (14 May 2021); Al-Ain 3–4 Al-Batin (30 May 2021)
- Longest winning run: Al-Hilal (5 matches)
- Longest unbeaten run: Al-Ittihad (11 matches)
- Longest winless run: Al-Ahli; Al-Raed (9 matches)
- Longest losing run: Al-Ahli; Al-Wehda (7 matches)
- All statistics correct as of 30 May 2021.

The 2020–21 Saudi Pro League was the 46th edition of the top-tier Saudi football league, established in 1974, and the 13th edition since it was rebranded as the Saudi Pro League in 2008, the season began on 17 October 2020 as a consequence of the postponement of the previous season's conclusion due to the COVID-19 pandemic. Fixtures for the 2020–21 season were announced on 29 September 2020.

== Overview ==
Al-Hilal are the defending champions after winning the Pro League for the 16th time last season. Al-Ain, Al-Batin, and Al-Qadsiah join as the three promoted clubs from the 2019–20 MS League. They replace Al-Adalah, Al-Fayha, and Al-Hazem who were relegated to the 2020–21 MS League.

On 29 March, the Ministry of Sports announced that fans will be allowed to return to stadiums for the final three rounds of matches with a maximum of 40% capacity.

On 23 May, Al-Hilal secured their seventeenth league title with one match to spare following a 1–0 away win against Al-Taawoun. It was also the club's second consecutive title and fourth in the last five seasons. Al-Ain were the first team to be relegated following a 2–0 defeat away to Al-Nassr on 14 May. In the final matchday, both Al-Qadsiah and Al-Wehda were relegated following a draw with Abha and a loss against Al-Shabab respectively.

== Teams ==
Locations of teams in the 2020–21 Saudi Professional League

Sixteen teams will compete in the league – the top thirteen teams from the previous season and the three teams promoted from the MS League.

Teams who were promoted to the Pro League

The first club to be promoted was Al-Batin, who were promoted following Al-Bukayriyah's 1–1 draw with Al-Ain on 1 September 2020. Al-Batin will play in the top flight of Saudi football after a season's absence. Al-Batin were crowned champions following their 1–1 draw with Al-Bukayriyah on the final matchday.

The second club to be promoted was Al-Ain, who were promoted on 10 September 2020 following their 2–0 win at home against Ohod. Al-Ain will play in the top flight of Saudi football for the first time in history. Al-Ain became the first team from the Al Bahah Region to play in the Pro League.

The third and final club to be promoted was Al-Qadsiah, following their 3–1 home win against an already promoted Al-Batin side on 10 September 2020. Al-Qadsiah will play in the top flight of Saudi football after a season's absence.

Teams who were relegated to the MS League

The first club to be relegated was Al-Adalah, who were relegated after only a year in the top flight following a 1–1 home draw with Al-Raed.

On 4 September 2020, Al-Hazem became the second club to be relegated following a 1–0 defeat away to Al-Shabab. Al-Hazem were relegated after two years in the top flight.

On 9 September 2020, Al-Fayha became the third and final club to be relegated following a 1–0 defeat away to Al-Taawoun in the final matchday. Al-Fayha were relegated after three years in the Pro League. This was Al-Fayha's first relegation from the top flight of Saudi football.

=== Stadiums ===
Note: Table lists in alphabetical order.

Team	Location	Stadium	Capacity
Abha	Abha	Prince Sultan bin Abdul Aziz Stadium	20,000
Al-Ahli	Jeddah	King Abdullah Sports City	62,345
Al-Ain	Al Bahah	King Saud Sport City Stadium (Al Bahah)	10,000
Al-Batin	Hafar al-Batin	Al-Batin Club Stadium	6,000
Al-Ettifaq	Dammam	Prince Mohamed bin Fahd Stadium	35,000
Al-Faisaly	Harmah	Al Majma'ah Sports City	7,000
Al-Fateh	Al-Hasa	Prince Abdullah bin Jalawi Stadium	26,000
Al-Hilal	Riyadh	King Fahd International Stadium	62,685
Al-Ittihad	Jeddah	King Abdullah Sports City	62,345
Al-Nassr	Riyadh	King Saud University Stadium	25,000
Al-Qadsiah	Khobar	Prince Saud bin Jalawi Stadium	15,000
Al-Raed	Buraidah	King Abdullah Sport City Stadium	25,000
Al-Shabab	Riyadh	King Fahd International Stadium	62,685
Al-Taawoun	Buraidah	King Abdullah Sport City Stadium	25,000
Al-Wehda	Mecca	King Abdul Aziz Stadium	38,000
Damac	Khamis Mushait	Prince Sultan bin Abdul Aziz Stadium	20,000

1: Al-Faisaly play their home games in Al Majma'ah.
2: Al-Hilal and Al-Shabab also use Prince Faisal bin Fahd Stadium (22,500 seats) as a home stadium.

=== Personnel and kits ===
Team	Manager	Captain	Kit manufacturer	Shirt sponsor
Abha	(Tunisia) Abderrazek Chebbi	(Tunisia) Karim Aouadhi	Offside	Yelo, Vveyon, Mezaj Maghribi^{1}, Saudi German Hospital^{1}, ARASCO^{2}
Al-Ahli	(Romania) Laurențiu Reghecampf	(Saudi Arabia) Yasser Al-Mosailem	Xtep	Saudia, MG Cars, Almsakin Palace, Boga Super Foods^{2}, Saudi German Hospital^{2}
Al-Ain	(Spain) Pablo Machín	(Saudi Arabia) Saeed Al-Qarni	Puma	Gento, Ugine^{1}
Al-Batin	(Serbia) Aleksandar Veselinović	(Saudi Arabia) Mazyad Freeh	Skillano	Traof, AlNadeg^{1}, Yelo^{1}, ARASCO^{2}, Maroom Medical Center^{2}
Al-Ettifaq	(Saudi Arabia) Khaled Al-Atwi	(Algeria) Raïs M'Bolhi	Jako	Al Mattar, Mystery, Kammelna^{1}, Innosoft^{2}, Thouq^{2}, Saudi German Hospital^{3}
Al-Faisaly	(Brazil) Péricles Chamusca	(Brazil) Igor Rossi	adidas	ALDREES, Gree Electric, Yelo^{1}, Roco^{2}, ARASCO^{2}
Al-Fateh	(Belgium) Yannick Ferrera	(Saudi Arabia) Mohammed Al-Fuhaid	Offside	Kia Motors, Fuschia, Al Kifah Holding^{1}, Almoosa Hospital^{1}, ARASCO^{2}, B-Care^{2}
Al-Hilal	(Portugal) José Morais	(Saudi Arabia) Salman Al-Faraj	Mouj	EMAAR, Jahez, Tawuniya^{1}, Sayyar^{2}, Shawarmer^{2}
Al-Ittihad	(Brazil) Fábio Carille	(Morocco) Karim El Ahmadi	Tamim	B-IT Fitness^{1}, Fakeeh^{2}, Yelo^{2}
Al-Nassr	(Brazil) Mano Menezes	(Saudi Arabia) Yahya Al-Shehri	Victory	Etihad Airways, Almsakin Palace, Nejree^{1}, Richy^{2}, Naqi Water^{2}
Al-Qadsiah	(Tunisia) Yousef Al Mannai	(Saudi Arabia) Naif Hazazi	Puma	MG Cars, Almana Group of Hospital, Ghodran Group^{1}
Al-Raed	(Kosovo) Besnik Hasi	(Saudi Arabia) Hussain Al-Showaish	Challenge	Yelo, Address Cafe^{1}, ARASCO^{2}, B-Care^{2}
Al-Shabab	(Spain) Carlos Inarejos	(Argentina) Éver Banega	Xtep	Arkitainer, Aqdar, Bussma, Half Million, The Chefz, Nice One, Saudi German Hospital, Marvel Home^{1}, Sanabel Alsalam^{1}, Tact^{1}, F6or Faris^{2}, QAID^{2}, 3days^{3}, Azom^{3}, HealthZone^{3}, The Real Burger^{3}, Shawarma Classic^{3}, Veloce^{3}
Al-Taawoun	(England) Nestor El Maestro	(Saudi Arabia) Ibrahim Al-Zubaidi	Erreà	Fuchs, Nice One, Al Odhaib^{1}, ARASCO^{2}
Al-Wehda	(Greece) Georgios Donis	(Saudi Arabia) Waleed Bakshween	Tamim	Lebs.com, Al Ghazal, QAID^{2}
Damac	(Croatia) Krešimir Režić	(Algeria) Farouk Chafaï	Skillano	Abu Zaid, Bin Thaliba^{1}, Saudi German Hospital^{1}, Bnoon^{2}, Fazzah^{2}, Superano^{3}

- ^{1} On the back of the strip.
- ^{2} On the right sleeve of the strip.
- ^{3} On the shorts.

=== Managerial changes ===
Team	Outgoing manager	Manner of departure	Date of vacancy	Position in table	Incoming manager	Date of appointment
Al-Wehda	(Saudi Arabia) Essa Al-Mehyani (caretaker)	End of caretaker spell	9 September 2020	Pre-season	(Portugal) Ivo Vieira	10 September 2020
Al-Taawoun	(Saudi Arabia) Abdullah Asiri (caretaker)	End of caretaker spell	16 September 2020	Pre-season	(France) Patrice Carteron	16 September 2020
Al-Ain	(Tunisia) Al Habib Ben Ramadan	End of contract	20 September 2020	Pre-season	(Portugal) Bruno Baltazar	2 October 2020
Al-Ain	(Portugal) Bruno Baltazar	Resigned	12 October 2020	Pre-season	(Germany) Michael Skibbe	12 October 2020
Al-Nassr	(Portugal) Rui Vitória	Mutual consent	27 December 2020	15th	(Croatia) Alen Horvat	27 December 2020
Damac	(Algeria) Noureddine Zekri	Mutual consent	4 January 2021	16th	(Croatia) Krešimir Režić	12 January 2021
Al-Shabab	(Portugal) Pedro Caixinha	Sacked	5 January 2021	3rd	(Spain) Carlos Inarejos	5 January 2021
Al-Ain	(Germany) Michael Skibbe	Sacked	28 January 2021	16th	(Spain) Pablo Machín	31 January 2021
Al-Wehda	(Portugal) Ivo Vieira	Sacked	2 February 2021	10th	(Jordan) Mahmoud Al-Hadid	2 February 2021
Al-Hilal	(Romania) Răzvan Lucescu	Mutual consent	15 February 2021	3rd	(Brazil) Rogério Micale	15 February 2021
Al-Taawoun	(France) Patrice Carteron	Mutual consent	11 March 2021	4th	(England) Nestor El Maestro	13 March 2021
Al-Batin	(Portugal) José Garrido	Sacked	20 March 2021	13th	(Serbia) Aleksandar Veselinović	24 March 2021
Al-Wehda	(Jordan) Mahmoud Al-Hadid	Sacked	21 March 2021	14th	(Greece) Georgios Donis	23 March 2021
Al-Ahli	(Serbia) Vladan Milojević	Mutual consent	24 March 2021	7th	(Romania) Laurențiu Reghecampf	31 March 2021
Al-Nassr	(Croatia) Alen Horvat	Sacked	9 April 2021	5th	(Brazil) Mano Menezes	9 April 2021
Al-Hilal	(Brazil) Rogério Micale	Sacked	2 May 2021	1st	(Portugal) José Morais	2 May 2021

=== Foreign players ===
The policy of foreign players remained unchanged. Clubs can register a total of seven foreign players over the course of the season.

Players name in bold indicates the player is registered during the mid-season transfer window.

Club	Player 1	Player 2	Player 3	Player 4	Player 5	Player 6	Player 7	Former Players
Abha	(Algeria) Mehdi Tahrat	(Bosnia and Herzegovina) **Benjamin Tatar**	(Morocco) Amine Atouchi	(Morocco) Abdelali Mhamdi	(Sweden) Carlos Strandberg	(Tunisia) Karim Aouadhi	(Tunisia) Saad Bguir	(Australia) Craig Goodwin
Al-Ahli	(Bosnia and Herzegovina) **Elvis Sarić**	(Brazil) Lucas Lima	(Morocco) Driss Fettouhi	(Romania) Alexandru Mitrita	(Senegal) **M'Baye Niang**	(Serbia) Ljubomir Fejsa	(Ba'athist Syria) Omar Al Somah	(Germany) Marko Marin (Ghana) Samuel Owusu
Al-Ain	(Angola) Bastos	(Brazil) Getterson	(Croatia) Filip Bradarić	(Ghana) **Naeem**	(Niger) Amadou Moutari	(Senegal) **Badou Ndiaye**	(Venezuela) Juanpi	(Algeria) Saphir Taïder (Morocco) Mohammed Nahiri (Nigeria) Peter Nworah (Tunisia) Haythem Jouini
Al-Batin	(Angola) Fábio Abreu	(Brazil) Renato Chaves	(Netherlands) Youssef El Jebli	(Netherlands) Mohamed Rayhi	(Netherlands) Xandro Schenk	(Uruguay) Martín Campaña	(Trinidad and Tobago) Khaleem Hyland	
Al-Ettifaq	(Algeria) Raïs M'Bolhi	(Brazil) Elierce Souza	(Estonia) Karol Mets	(Morocco) Walid Azaro	(Senegal) Souleymane Doukara	(Slovakia) Filip Kiss	(Tunisia) Naïm Sliti	
Al-Faisaly	(Brazil) Guilherme	(Brazil) Igor Rossi	(Brazil) Raphael Silva	(Cape Verde) Julio Tavares	(France) Romain Amalfitano	(Kazakhstan) Alexander Merkel	(Netherlands) Hicham Faik	
Al-Fateh	(Algeria) Sofiane Bendebka	(Algeria) **Hillal Soudani**	(Morocco) Mourad Batna	(Morocco) Marwane Saâdane	(Netherlands) Mitchell te Vrede	(Peru) **Christian Cueva**	(Ukraine) Maksym Koval	(Norway) Gustav Wikheim (Serbia) Saša Jovanović
Al-Hilal	(Argentina) Luciano Vietto	(Colombia) Gustavo Cuéllar	(France) Bafétimbi Gomis	(Italy) Sebastian Giovinco	(South Korea) Jang Hyun-soo	(Peru) André Carrillo		(Ba'athist Syria) Omar Kharbin
Al-Ittihad	(Brazil) Bruno Henrique	(Brazil) Marcelo Grohe	(Brazil) Romarinho	(Cape Verde) Garry Rodrigues	(Egypt) Ahmed Hegazi	(Morocco) Karim El Ahmadi	(Serbia) Aleksandar Prijović	(Brazil) Bruno Uvini
Al-Nassr	(Argentina) Pity Martínez	(Australia) Brad Jones	(Brazil) Maicon	(Brazil) Petros	(South Korea) Kim Jin-su	(Morocco) Nordin Amrabat	(Morocco) Abderrazak Hamdallah	(Nigeria) Ahmed Musa
Al-Qadsiah	(Australia) Rhys Williams	(Brazil) Edson da Cruz	(Colombia) Danilo Asprilla	(Madagascar) Carolus Andria	(Nigeria) **Leke James**	(Nigeria) Stanley Ohawuchi	(Serbia) Uroš Vitas	(Romania) Mihai Bordeianu
Al-Raed	(Algeria) Azzedine Doukha	(Chile) **Ronnie Fernández**	(Cameroon) Arnaud Djoum	(Germany) **Marko Marin**	(Morocco) Karim El Berkaoui	(Morocco) Mohamed Fouzair	(Serbia) Nemanja Miletić	(Morocco) Jalal Daoudi (Serbia) Nemanja Nikolić (Ba'athist Syria) Jehad Al-Hussain
Al-Shabab	(Argentina) Éver Banega	(Argentina) Cristian Guanca	(Brazil) Sebá	(Chile) Igor Lichnovsky	(Nigeria) **Odion Ighalo**	(Portugal) Fábio Martins	(Senegal) Alfred N'Diaye	(Lithuania) Giedrius Arlauskis (Senegal) Makhete Diop
Al-Taawoun	(Brazil) Cássio	(Brazil) Iago Santos	(Brazil) Sandro Manoel	(Burundi) Cédric Amissi	(Cameroon) Léandre Tawamba	(Paraguay) **Kaku**	(Senegal) Abdoulaye Sané	(Australia) Mitchell Duke
Al-Wehda	(Australia) Dimitri Petratos	(Brazil) Anselmo	(Brazil) Luis Gustavo	(Brazil) Pedro Henrique	(France) Youssouf Niakaté	(Portugal) Hernâni	(Spain) Alberto Botía	
Damac	(Algeria) Farouk Chafaï	(Algeria) Moustapha Zeghba	(Argentina) Sergio Vittor	(Argentina) Emilio Zelaya	(Croatia) **Domagoj Antolić**	(Norway) **Amahl Pellegrino**	(Romania) **Constantin Budescu**	(Algeria) Ibrahim Chenihi (Argentina) Cristian Lema (Tunisia) Bilel Saidani

== League table ==
Pos	Team	Pld	W	D	L	GF	GA	GD	Pts	Qualification or relegation
1	Al-Hilal (C)	30	18	7	5	60	27	+33	61	Qualification for AFC Champions League group stage
2	Al-Shabab	30	17	6	7	68	43	+25	57	Qualification for AFC Champions League group stage
3	Al-Ittihad (Note: Al-Ittihad cannot qualify for Asian Football Confederation competitions as they did not obtain an AFC license.)	30	15	11	4	45	29	+16	56	
4	Al-Taawoun	30	13	8	9	42	30	+12	47 (Note: Positions determined by head-to-head points: Al-Taawoun 4 pts; Al-Ettifaq 1 pt.)	Qualification for AFC Champions League play-off round
5	Al-Ettifaq	30	14	5	11	50	48	+2	47	
6	Al-Nassr	30	13	7	10	53	40	+13	46	
7	Al-Fateh	30	12	6	12	55	55	0	42	
8	Al-Ahli	30	11	6	13	44	56	−12	39	
9	Al-Faisaly	30	9	9	12	42	47	−5	36 (Note: Positions determined by head-to-head points: Al-Faisaly: 16 pts; Al-Raed: 15 pts; Damac: 13 pts; Al-Batin: 12 pts; Abha: 3 pts.)	Qualification for the Champions League group stage (Note: Al-Faisaly qualified for the Champions League group stage as 2020–21 King Cup winners.)
10	Al-Raed	30	10	6	14	44	47	−3	36	
11	Damac	30	9	9	12	43	48	−5	36	
12	Al-Batin	30	9	9	12	43	55	−12	36	
13	Abha	30	10	6	14	42	50	−8	36	
14	Al-Qadsiah (R)	30	8	11	11	41	47	−6	35	Relegation to MS League
15	Al-Wehda (R)	30	9	5	16	40	60	−20	32	Relegation to MS League
16	Al-Ain (R)	30	5	5	20	34	64	−30	20	Relegation to MS League

Source: spl.com source=إحصائيات رابطة دوري المحترفين السعودي 2020-2021
Rules for classification: 1) Points; 2) Head-to-head points; 3) Head-to-head goal difference; 4) Total goal difference; 5) Total goals scored; 6) Fair-play points (Note: Head-to-head record is used only after all the matches between the teams in question have been played).
(C) Champions; (R) Relegated

== Positions by round ==
The following table lists the positions of teams after each week of matches. In order to preserve the chronological evolution, any postponed matches are not included to the round at which they were originally scheduled but added to the full round they were played immediately afterward. If a club from the Saudi Professional League wins the King Cup, they will qualify for the AFC Champions League, unless they have already qualified for it through their league position. In this case, an additional AFC Champions League group stage berth will be given to the 3rd placed team, and the AFC Champions League play-off round spot will be given to 4th.

Team ╲ Round	1	2	3	4	5	6	7	8	9	10	11	12	13	14	15	16	17	18	19	20	21	22	23	24	25	26	27	28	29	30
Al-Hilal	5	7	2	1	1	1	1	1	1	1	1	1	1	1	1	2	3	3	2	2	2	2	1	1	1	1	1	1	1	1
Al-Shabab	7	6	4	2	2	2	2	3	3	3	3	2	2	2	2	1	1	1	1	1	1	1	2	2	2	2	2	2	2	2
Al-Ittihad	12	11	8	10	10	6	4	4	5	5	4	4	5	4	4	5	4	4	4	4	3	3	3	3	3	3	4	3	3	3
Al-Taawoun	9	8	11	11	7	8	6	8	4	7	6	6	4	5	5	4	5	6	8	7	5	5	4	4	4	4	3	4	4	4
Al-Ettifaq	3	1	5	8	11	12	12	10	6	4	7	9	8	6	7	6	7	5	6	5	6	6	7	6	6	6	6	6	6	5
Al-Nassr	11	14	14	13	15	15	15	15	15	15	14	11	10	7	6	7	6	7	9	8	7	7	6	5	5	5	5	5	5	6
Al-Fateh	4	4	1	6	3	4	7	11	13	8	8	7	11	11	11	12	13	11	10	11	13	14	12	9	9	8	7	7	7	7
Al-Ahli	6	2	7	3	5	3	3	2	2	2	2	3	3	3	3	3	2	2	3	3	4	4	5	7	7	9	8	8	8	8
Al-Faisaly	8	5	3	4	6	7	5	5	7	9	11	12	12	12	13	14	11	12	12	10	8	8	9	11	12	12	9	9	9	9
Al-Raed	1	3	9	5	4	5	8	12	11	12	12	13	14	14	14	11	12	14	14	14	12	13	10	12	10	7	10	10	10	10
Damac	10	13	15	15	16	16	16	16	16	16	16	16	16	15	15	15	15	15	15	15	15	15	15	15	14	14	15	15	13	11
Al-Batin	15	15	13	7	8	9	11	7	10	11	13	14	13	13	12	13	14	13	13	12	10	10	11	13	13	13	13	13	14	12
Abha	14	12	10	12	12	11	9	9	12	13	9	8	6	9	8	10	8	10	11	13	14	11	13	10	11	11	12	12	11	13
Al-Qadsiah	13	9	6	9	9	10	10	6	8	10	10	10	9	10	9	8	9	8	5	6	9	9	8	8	8	10	11	11	12	14
Al-Wehda	2	10	12	14	14	14	14	13	9	6	5	5	7	8	10	9	10	9	7	9	11	12	14	14	15	15	14	14	15	15
Al-Ain	16	16	16	16	13	13	13	14	14	14	15	15	15	16	16	16	16	16	16	16	16	16	16	16	16	16	16	16	16	16

Leader
2022 AFC Champions League group stage
2022 AFC Champions League play-off round
Relegation to 2021–22 MS League

Updated to match(es) played on 30 May 2021. Source: spl.com.sa

== Results ==
Home \ Away	ABH	AHL	AIN	BAT	ETT	FSY	FAT	HIL	ITT	NSR	QAD	RAE	SHB	TWN	WHD	DAM
Abha		1–1	1–0	1–2	3–2	1–0	2–1	1–1	1–1	2–1	2–2	0–3	2–3	0–0	0–1	3–4
Al-Ahli	3–0		1–1	2–2	1–2	2–1	1–0	0–0	1–1	1–2	1–0	2–3	2–2	0–3	1–0	1–3
Al-Ain	2–4	3–4		3–4	1–0	1–1	2–4	0–5	1–2	0–2	1–2	1–0	0–3	1–0	4–0	1–1
Al-Batin	3–0	0–1	2–1		3–2	0–2	0–2	2–2	1–2	1–2	2–2	2–1	1–4	1–1	3–0	0–2
Al-Ettifaq	4–1	1–2	2–1	1–1		1–0	0–4	0–2	2–0	1–1	1–3	3–1	4–3	0–3	1–2	4–2
Al-Faisaly	2–1	2–1	1–1	2–1	0–3		2–3	1–1	1–1	2–3	2–2	0–1	1–5	0–0	2–4	2–0
Al-Fateh	1–3	4–1	3–2	1–2	2–3	3–2		2–5	2–2	1–1	3–0	0–2	1–3	1–2	2–3	1–1
Al-Hilal	2–3	5–1	1–0	1–1	3–1	3–2	3–0		1–1	2–0	1–0	2–1	1–1	2–0	1–2	2–0
Al-Ittihad	0–1	2–0	1–0	0–0	1–2	1–3	4–1	2–0		1–1	1–0	0–0	2–1	1–1	4–2	1–0
Al-Nassr	2–2	1–2	3–0	7–0	2–2	4–3	1–2	1–0	1–2		2–0	3–1	0–4	3–0	3–1	2–2
Al-Qadsiah	1–1	3–1	3–3	2–2	1–2	1–2	1–1	1–3	1–4	1–0		0–1	2–1	1–0	2–2	2–1
Al-Raed	2–1	1–2	4–0	1–2	2–3	0–2	2–2	0–1	1–1	0–1	2–2		2–2	1–2	1–3	4–2
Al-Shabab	1–0	3–0	5–1	3–1	1–0	1–1	1–2	1–5	1–1	2–1	1–1	4–1		1–3	3–0	2–1
Al-Taawoun	1–0	4–2	3–0	2–2	1–1	1–1	3–4	0–1	1–2	1–0	0–2	0–0	4–0		1–0	3–1
Al-Wehda	1–4	2–4	2–1	3–2	0–1	1–2	0–0	2–4	1–2	1–1	2–1	2–3	2–4	0–2		1–1
Damac	2–1	4–3	0–2	2–0	1–1	0–0	1–2	1–0	1–1	3–2	2–2	2–3	1–2	2–0	0–0	

Updated to match(es) played on 30 May 2021. Source: goalzz.com
Legend: Blue = home team win; Yellow = draw; Red = away team win.
For upcoming matches, an "a" indicates there is an article about the rivalry between the two participants.

== Season statistics ==
As of 30 May 2021

=== Scoring ===
==== Top scorers ====
Rank	Player	Club	Goals
1	(France) Bafétimbi Gomis	Al-Hilal	24
2	(Argentina) Emilio Zelaya	Damac	19
3	(Argentina) Cristian Guanca	Al-Shabab	17
3	(Angola) Fabio Abreu	Al-Batin	17
5	(Sweden) Carlos Strandberg	Abha	16
5	(Brazil) Romarinho	Al-Ittihad	16
7	(Morocco) Karim El Berkaoui	Al-Raed	15
7	(Cape Verde) Júlio Tavares	Al-Faisaly	15
9	(Suriname) Mitchell te Vrede	Al-Fateh	13
9	(Cameroon) Léandre Tawamba	Al-Taawoun	13

==== Hat-tricks ====
Player	For	Against	Result	Date	Ref.
(Ba'athist Syria) Omar Al Somah	Al-Ahli	Al-Ain	4–3 (A)	7 November 2020	
(Australia) Dimitri Petratos	Al-Wehda	Al-Batin	3–2 (H)	29 November 2020	
(Sweden) Carlos Strandberg	Abha	Al-Ain	4–2 (A)	1 January 2021	
(Cameroon) Léandre Tawamba	Al-Taawoun	Damac	3–1 (H)	25 January 2021	
(Morocco) Karim El Berkaoui^{4}	Al-Raed	Damac	4–2 (H)	31 January 2021	
(France) Bafétimbi Gomis^{4}	Al-Hilal	Al-Ain	5–0 (A)	9 February 2021	
(France) Youssouf Niakaté	Al-Wehda	Al-Faisaly	4–2 (A)	12 February 2021	
(Netherlands) Mitchell te Vrede	Al-Fateh	Al-Ain	3–2 (H)	13 February 2021	
(Saudi Arabia) Abdullah Al-Mogren	Al-Raed	Al-Ain	4–0 (H)	28 February 2021	
(Serbia) Aleksandar Prijović	Al-Ittihad	Al-Qadsiah	4–1 (A)	28 February 2021	
(Brazil) Romarinho	Al-Ittihad	Al-Wehda	4–2 (H)	5 March 2021	
(France) Bafétimbi Gomis	Al-Hilal	Al-Wehda	4–2 (A)	11 March 2021	
(Algeria) Farouk Chafaï	Damac	Abha	4–3 (A)	21 March 2021	
(Colombia) Danilo Asprilla	Al-Qadsiah	Al-Ettifaq	3–1 (A)	10 April 2021	

Notes

(H) – Home; (A) – Away
^{4} Player scored 4 goals

=== Clean sheets ===
Rank	Player	Club	Clean sheets
1	(Brazil) Cássio	Al-Taawoun	11
2	(Algeria) Azzedine Doukha	Al-Raed	7
2	(Saudi Arabia) Abdullah Al-Mayouf	Al-Hilal	7
4	(Brazil) Marcelo Grohe	Al-Ittihad	6
5	(Australia) Brad Jones	Al-Nassr	5
5	(Saudi Arabia) Amin Bukhari	Al-Ain	5
5	(Saudi Arabia) Zaid Al-Bawardi	Al-Shabab	5
8	(Saudi Arabia) Mustafa Malayekah	Al-Faisaly	4
8	(Morocco) Abdelali Mhamdi	Abha	4
8	(Saudi Arabia) Mohammed Al-Rubeai	Al-Ahli	4
8	(Ukraine) Maksym Koval	Al-Fateh	4
8	(Algeria) Moustapha Zeghba	Damac	4

=== Discipline ===
==== Player ====
- Most yellow cards: 12
  - (Brazil) Anselmo (Al-Wehda)
- Most red cards: 2
  - (Morocco) Mohamed Fouzair (Al-Raed)

==== Club ====
- Most yellow cards: 78
  - Al-Taawoun
- Most red cards: 7
  - Al-Qadsiah

== Awards ==
=== Monthly awards ===
Month	Manager of the Month		Player of the Month		Goalkeeper of the Month		Rising Star of the Month		Reference
Month	Manager	Club	Player	Club	Player	Club	Player	Club	Reference
October	(Belgium) Yannick Ferrera	Al-Fateh	(Argentina) Éver Banega	Al-Shabab	(Saudi Arabia) Abdullah Al-Mayouf	Al-Hilal	(Saudi Arabia) Saud Abdulhamid	Al-Ittihad	
November	(Romania) Răzvan Lucescu	Al-Hilal	(Syria) Omar Al Somah	Al-Ahli	(Saudi Arabia) Amin Bukhari	Al-Ain	(Saudi Arabia) Abdulelah Al-Amri	Al-Nassr	
December	(Saudi Arabia) Khaled Al-Atwi	Al-Ettifaq	(Tunisia) Naïm Sliti	Al-Ettifaq	(Brazil) Marcelo Grohe	Al-Ittihad	(Saudi Arabia) Saud Abdulhamid	Al-Ittihad	
January	(Croatia) Alen Horvat	Al-Nassr	(Cameroon) Léandre Tawamba	Al-Taawoun	(Brazil) Cássio	Al-Taawoun	(Saudi Arabia) Abdullah Al-Hamdan	Al-Shabab	
February	(Spain) Carlos Inarejos	Al-Shabab	(Argentina) Éver Banega	Al-Shabab	(Brazil) Cássio	Al-Taawoun	(Saudi Arabia) Abdulrahman Ghareeb	Al-Ahli	
March	(Brazil) Rogério Micale	Al-Hilal	(Algeria) Farouk Chafaï	Damac	(Algeria) Raïs M'Bolhi	Al-Ettifaq	(Saudi Arabia) Abdulelah Al-Amri	Al-Nassr	
April & May	(Brazil) Fábio Carille	Al-Ittihad	(Nigeria) Odion Ighalo	Al-Shabab	(Brazil) Marcelo Grohe	Al-Ittihad	(Saudi Arabia) Sami Al-Najei	Al-Nassr	

=== Team of the Season ===
Team of the Season
Goalkeeper	(Brazil) Marcelo Grohe (Al-Ittihad)			
Defenders	(Brazil) Iago Santos (Al-Taawoun)		(Egypt) Ahmed Hegazi (Al-Ittihad)	(Saudi Arabia) Yasser Al-Shahrani (Al-Hilal)
Midfielders	(Argentina) Éver Banega (Al-Shabab)	(Brazil) Romarinho (Al-Ittihad)	(Argentina) Cristian Guanca (Al-Shabab)	(Peru) André Carrillo (Al-Hilal)
Forwards	(Saudi Arabia) Salem Al-Dawsari (Al-Hilal)		(France) Bafétimbi Gomis (Al-Hilal)	(Sweden) Carlos Strandberg (Abha)
