= Sultan Al-Anazi =

Saudi Arabian footballer

Sultan Al-Anazi سلطان العنزي
Personal information
- Full name: Sultan Abdulrahman Al-Anazi
- Date of birth: 26 April 2001 (age 25)
- Place of birth: Saudi Arabia
- Position: Midfielder

Team information
- Current team: Al-Nairyah
- Number: 14

Youth career
- –2018: Al-Qaisumah
- 2020–2022: Al-Nassr

Senior career*
Years	Team	Apps	(Gls)
2018–2020	Al-Qaisumah	23	(1)
2020–2024	Al-Nassr	0	(0)
2022–2023	→ Al-Qaisumah (loan)	13	(1)
2024–2025	Al-Lewaa	0	(0)
2025–	Al-Nairyah		

International career
2020	Saudi Arabia U20		
- * Club domestic league appearances and goals

Sultan Al-Anazi (Arabic: سلطان العنزي; born 26 April 2001), is a Saudi Arabian professional footballer who plays as a midfielder for Al-Nairyah.

== Career ==
Al-Anazi started his career at the youth team of Al-Qaisumah and represented the club at every level. On 22 June 2020, Al-Anazi joined Al-Nassr from Al-Qaisumah and signed a four-year contract with the club.

On 9 September 2022, Al-Anazi joined Al-Qaisumah on loan.

On 7 September 2025, Al-Anazi joined Al-Nairyah.

== Career statistics ==
=== Club ===
As of 1 December 2020.

Club	Season	League			Cup		Continental		Other		Total	
Club	Season	Division	Apps	Goals	Apps	Goals	Apps	Goals	Apps	Goals	Apps	Goals
Al-Qaisumah	2018–19	MS League	10	0	0	0	—		—		10	0
Al-Qaisumah	2019–20	Second Division	13	1	0	0	—		—		13	1
Al-Qaisumah	Al Qaisumah Total		23	1	0	0	0	0	0	0	23	1
Al-Nassr	2020–21	Pro League	0	0	0	0	0	0	—		0	0
Career totals			23	1	0	0	0	0	0	0	23	1
