= Amin Bukhari =

Saudi Arabian footballer (born 1997)

Amin Bukhari أمين بخاري
Personal information
- Full name: Amin Mohammed Jan Bukhari
- Date of birth: 2 May 1997 (age 29)
- Place of birth: Jeddah, Saudi Arabia
- Height: 1.94 m (6 ft 4 in)
- Position: Goalkeeper

Team information
- Current team: Al-Diriyah
- Number: 97

Youth career
- 2012–2018: Al-Ittihad

Senior career*
Years	Team	Apps	(Gls)
2018–2020	Al-Ittihad	0	(0)
2020–2025	Al-Nassr	11	(0)
2020–2021	→ Al-Ain (loan)	21	(0)
2023–2024	→ Al-Ettifaq (loan)	0	(0)
2024–2025	→ Damac (loan)	2	(0)
2025–2026	Al-Fateh	5	(0)
2026–	Al-Diriyah	0	(0)

International career
2016–2017	Saudi Arabia U20	6	(0)
2018–2021	Saudi Arabia U23	4	(0)
- * Club domestic league appearances and goals as of 25 August 2026

Amin Mohammed Jan Bukhari (Arabic: أمين محمد جان بخاري; born 2 May 1997) is a Saudi Arabian professional footballer who plays as a goalkeeper for Saudi Pro League club Al-Diriyah.

== Career ==
Bukhari started his career at the youth team of Al-Ittihad and represented the club at every level except the senior level. On 29 January 2020, Bukhari joined Al-Nassr on a free transfer. He signed a three-year contract with the club. On 16 October 2020, joined to Al-Ain on loan of the season from Al-Nassr. On 7 September 2023, Bukhari joined Al-Ettifaq on a one-year loan. On 3 September 2024, Bukhari joined Damac on a one-year loan.

On 26 August 2025, Bukhari joined Al-Fateh on a three-year deal.

== Career statistics ==
=== Club ===
As of 27 May 2025.

Club	Season	League			Cup		Continental		Other		Total	
Club	Season	Division	Apps	Goals	Apps	Goals	Apps	Goals	Apps	Goals	Apps	Goals
Al-Ittihad	2018–19	Pro League	0	0	0	0	0	0	0	0	0	0
Al-Ittihad	2019–20	Pro League	0	0	0	0	—		0	0	0	0
Al-Ittihad	Total		0	0	0	0	0	0	0	0	0	0
Al-Nassr	2020–21	Pro League	0	0	0	0	0	0	0	0	0	0
Al-Nassr	2021–22	Pro League	10	0	0	0	0	0	—		10	0
Al-Nassr	2022–23	Pro League	1	0	0	0	—		0	0	1	0
Al-Nassr	Total		11	0	0	0	0	0	0	0	11	0
Al-Ain (loan)	2020–21	Pro League	21	0	1	0	—		—		22	0
Al-Ettifaq (loan)	2023–24	Pro League	0	0	1	0	—		—		1	0
Damac (loan)	2024–25	Pro League	2	0	0	0	—		—		2	0
Al-Fateh	2025–26	Pro League	0	0	0	0	—		—		0	0
Career totals			34	0	2	0	0	0	0	0	36	0

== Honours ==
Al Nassr

- Arab Club Champions Cup: 2023

Individual

- Saudi Professional League Goalkeeper of the Month: November 2020
