= Mohammed Al-Shoraimi =

Saudi Arabian footballer

Mohammed Al-Shoraimi محمد الشريمي
Personal information
- Full name: Mohammed Moussa Al-Shoraimi
- Date of birth: February 21, 1995 (age 31)
- Place of birth: Al-H̨arīq, Saudi Arabia
- Height: 1.77 m (5 ft 10 in)
- Position: Defender

Youth career
- –2013: Al-Hareq
- 2013–2017: Al-Hilal

Senior career*
Years	Team	Apps	(Gls)
2017–2020	Al-Raed	30	(0)
2020–2022	Al-Ain	39	(0)
2022–2023	Al-Arabi	20	(0)
2023–2024	Al-Najma		
- * Club domestic league appearances and goals as of 9 September 2020

Mohammed Al-Shoraimi (Arabic: محمد الشريمي, born 21 February 1995) is a Saudi Arabian professional footballer who plays as a defender.

== Career ==
Al-Shoraimi started his career at the youth team of Al-Hariq in Al-H̨arīq. On 3 July 2013, he joined the youth team of Al-Hilal. Al-Shoraimi left Al-Hilal and joined Pro League side Al-Raed on June 15, 2017. He renewed his contract with Al-Raed on July 14, 2019. On 8 October 2020, Al-Shoraimi was released by Al-Raed. On 10 October 2020, Al-Shoraimi joined newly-promoted side Al-Ain on a two-year deal. On 13 July 2022, Al-Shoraimi joined Al-Arabi.

On 10 June 2023, Al-Shoraimi joined Al-Najma.

== Career statistics ==
=== Club ===
As of match played 28 May 2022

Club	Season	League			King Cup		Asia		Other		Total	
Club	Season	Division	Apps	Goals	Apps	Goals	Apps	Goals	Apps	Goals	Apps	Goals
Al-Raed	2017–18	Pro League	8	0	1	0	—		0	0	9	0
Al-Raed	2018–19	Pro League	9	0	2	0	—		—		11	0
Al-Raed	2019–20	Pro League	13	0	1	0	—		—		14	0
Al-Raed	Total		30	0	4	0	0	0	0	0	34	0
Al-Ain	2020–21	Pro League	16	0	1	0	—		—		17	0
Al-Ain	2021–22	First Division League	23	0	—		—		—		23	0
Al-Ain	Total		39	0	1	0	0	0	0	0	40	0
Career totals			69	0	5	0	0	0	0	0	74	0
