= Saeed Al-Zahrani (footballer, born 1995) =

Saudi Arabian footballer

Saeed Al-Zahrani سعيد الزهراني
Personal information
- Full name: Saeed Ghormallah Dhafer Al-Zahrani
- Date of birth: 1 July 1995 (age 31)
- Place of birth: Saudi Arabia
- Height: 1.72 m (5 ft 8 in)
- Position: Winger

Team information
- Current team: Al-Jandal
- Number: 9

Youth career
- Al-Ain

Senior career*
Years	Team	Apps	(Gls)
2015–2019	Al-Ain		
2019–2020	Ohod	0	(0)
2020–2023	Al-Ain	66	(7)
2023–2025	Al-Safa	42	(2)
2025–	Al-Jandal	0	(0)

International career
2016	Saudi Arabia U23		
- * Club domestic league appearances and goals as of 31 May 2023

Saeed Al-Zahrani (Arabic: سعيد الزهراني; born 1 July 1995) is a Saudi Arabian professional footballer who plays as a winger for Al-Jandal.

== Career ==
Al-Zahrani started his career at the youth team of Al-Ain and represented the club at every level. On 18 July 2019, Al-Zahrani joined Ohod. On 1 February 2020, after making no appearances for Ohod, Al-Zahrani returned to Al-Ain. Al-Zahrani achieved promotion with Al-Ain to the Pro League for the first time in the club's history.

On 5 July 2023, Al-Zahrani joined Al-Safa.

On 10 September 2025, Al-Zahrani joined Al-Jandal.
