= Faisel Al-Jamaan =

Saudi Arabian footballer

Personal information
- Full name: Faisel Mohamed Al-Jamaan Al-Dosari
- Date of birth: June 12, 1986 (age 40)
- Place of birth: Riyadh, Saudi Arabia
- Height: 1.78 m (5 ft 10 in)
- Position: Forward

Youth career
- Al-Hilal

Senior career*
Years	Team	Apps	(Gls)
2007–2010	Al-Fateh		
2010	Al-Hilal	3	(0)
2012–2014	Hajer	41	(17)
2014–2016	Al-Fateh	17	(2)
2015–2016	→ Al-Ettifaq (loan)	25	(5)
2016–2019	Hajer	80	(21)
2019–2021	Al-Ain	53	(7)
2021–2022	Al-Jabalain	31	(7)
2022–2023	Al-Jeel		
- * Club domestic league appearances and goals as of 30 May 2021

Faisel Al-Jamaan (Arabic: فيصل الجمعان; born June 12, 1986) is a Saudi football player who plays a striker.

== Honours ==
Al-Hilal

- Saudi Professional League: 2010–11

Hajer

- Saudi First Division: 2013–14

Al-Ettifaq

- Saudi First Division: 2015–16
