= Ammar Al-Ibrahim =

Saudi Arabian footballer

Ammar Al-Ibrahim عَمَّار الإبرَاهِيْم
Personal information
- Full name: Ammar Bager Al-Ibrahim
- Date of birth: 1 July 1997 (age 29)
- Place of birth: Al-Ahsa, Saudi Arabia
- Position: Winger

Youth career
- 2011–2017: Al-Fateh

Senior career*
Years	Team	Apps	(Gls)
2017–2018	Al-Oyon		
2018–2020	Al-Anwar		
2020–2021	Al-Ain	1	(0)
2022–2023	Al-Omran		

International career
2015–2016	Saudi Arabia U20		
- * Club domestic league appearances and goals as of 20 September 2020

Ammar Al-Ibrahim (Arabic: عَمَّار الإبرَاهِيْم; born 1 July 1997) is a Saudi Arabian professional footballer who plays as a winger.

== Career ==
Al-Ibrahim started his career at the youth team of Al-Fateh and represented the club at every level except the senior level, he then played with Al-Oyon and Al-Anwar in Saudi Third Division and succeeded in climbing with Al-Anwar from Saudi Third Division to the Saudi Second Division in the 2018–2019 season and he succeeded in scoring the goal of the ascent against Tuwaiq, On 26 October 2020, Al-Ibrahim joined Al-Ain.
