= Sajar Al-Shammeri =

Saudi Arabian footballer

Sajar Al-Shammeri ساجر الشمري
Personal information
- Full name: Sajar Hamad Al-Shammeri
- Date of birth: 1 July 1992 (age 34)
- Place of birth: Saudi Arabia
- Position: Forward

Team information
- Current team: Arar

Youth career
- Al-Jandal

Senior career*
Years	Team	Apps	(Gls)
2012–2017	Al-Jandal		
2013	→ Al-Qala (loan)		
2017–2018	Al-Taqadom		
2018–2020	Al-Jandal		
2020–2022	Al-Ain	19	(3)
2021	→ Al-Diriyah (loan)	12	(1)
2022–2025	Al-Jandal	71	(4)
2025–2026	Al-Qala		
2026–	Arar		
- * Club domestic league appearances and goals as of 7 December 2020

Sajar Al-Shammeri (Arabic: ساجر الشمري; born 1 July 1992) is a Saudi Arabian professional footballer who plays as a forward for Arar.

== Career ==
Al-Shammeri started his career at the youth team of Al-Jandal and represented the club at every level. On 5 March 2013, joined to Al-Qala on loan from Al-Jandal. On 1 August 2017, Al-Shammeri joined Al-Taqadom, On 26 August 2018, Al-Shammeri return to Al-Jandal. On 23 January 2020, Al-Shammeri joined Al-Ain, Al-Shammeri achieved promotion with Al-Ain to the Pro League for the first time in the club's history. On 20 August 2022, Al-Shammeri joined Al-Jandal. On 13 August 2025, Al-Shammeri joined Al-Qala.
