= Alen Horvat =

Croatian footballer and manager

Personal information
- Date of birth: 13 September 1973 (age 53)
- Place of birth: Rijeka, Croatia
- Position: Midfielder

Senior career*
Years	Team	Apps	(Gls)
1992–1995	Rijeka	67	(1)
1997	Segesta	10	(0)
1997–2000	Orijent 1919	42	(3)
2000–2003	Novalja	41	(0)
2003–2005	Pomorac	27	(0)

International career
1994	Croatia U21	5	(0)

Managerial career
- 2007–2010: Krk
- 2011–2012: Rijeka
- 2012–2013: Krk
- 2013–2014: Pomorac
- 2014–2015: Bistra
- 2015–2016: Hrvatski Dragovoljac
- 2016: Marsonia
- 2017–2019: Al-Wasl B
- 2018: Al-Ain
- 2019–2020: Al-Khaleej
- 2020–2021: Al-Nassr
- 2021–2023: Al-Batin
- 2023–2024: Al-Arabi
- 2024–2025: Al Dhafra
- 2025–2026: Al Dhafra
- 2026: Al Dhafra
- * Club domestic league appearances and goals

Alen Horvat (born 13 September 1973) is a Croatian professional football manager and former player.

During the period in Al-Nassr FC in January 2021, he won Saudi Super Cup and was also named as Coach of the Month in Saudi League.

== Career ==
Horvat played for the Croatia national team and was one of the youngest captain in history of HNK Rijeka. He played his professional debut for HNK Rijeka when he was eighteen years old. Also when he started his coaching career, he was one of the youngest coaches in HNK Rijeka. After a successful career in Croatia, Horvat continues his career in Saudi Arabia and the UAE. In January 2021 with Al Nassr FC he won the Saudi Super Cup.

On 21 October 2021, Horvat was appointed as manager of Al-Batin. The main goal of the season was to stay in the league, which was achieved. The contract ends in February 2023

In the 2024/25 season, Horvat was the coach of Al Dhafra SC. He won the championship with the club and promoted the club to the ADNOC Pro League, which is one of the greatest results in the club's history.

In April 2026, for 2025/26 season, Horvat was the coach of Al Dhafra SC. He was appointed during critical stage of 2025/26 season with club positioned in relegation zone. Tasked by board with securing UAE Pro League survival under significant competitive pressure. He successfully preserved UAE Pro League status and guided team to safety after taking charge during decisive final phase of season.

== Statistics ==
=== Player ===
Club performance			League		Cup		Total	
Season	Club	League	Apps	Goals	Apps	Goals	Apps	Goals
Croatia			League		Croatian Cup		Total	
1992	HNK Rijeka	Prva HNL	4	0	1	0	5	0
1992–93	HNK Rijeka	Prva HNL	3	0	0	0	3	0
1993–94	HNK Rijeka	Prva HNL	19	0	7	0	26	0
1994–95	HNK Rijeka	Prva HNL	19	0	2	0	21	0
1995–96	HNK Rijeka	Prva HNL	19	1	4	0	23	1
1996–97	HNK Rijeka	Prva HNL	3	0	2	0	5	0
1996–97	HNK Segesta	Prva HNL	5	0	0	0	5	0
Total			72	1	16	0	88	1

=== Manager ===
Team	From	To	Record				
Team	From	To	G	W	D	L	Win %
HNK Rijeka	20 June 2011	4 October 2011	11	4	4	3	36.36
Pomorac Kostrena	1 July 2013	30 June 2014	34	10	14	10	29.41
NK Bistra	24 February 2015	30 June 2015	14	2	6	6	14.29
Hrvatski Dragovoljac	10 September 2015	23 December 2015	14	3	5	6	21.43
Marsonia	4 April 2016	9 September 2016	13	6	2	5	46.15
Al-Ain	9 February 2019	20 May 2019	15	6	7	2	40.00
Al-Khaleej	7 July 2019	14 December 2019	17	4	6	7	23.53
Al-Nassr	27 December 2020	9 April 2021	18	10	4	4	55.56
Al-Batin	22 October 2021	19 February 2023	41	8	9	24	19.51
Al-Arabi	2 July 2023	24 January 2024	19	8	4	7	42.11
Al Dhafra	March 2024	31 May 2025	39	22	10	7	56.41
Al Dhafra	April 2026	Present	4	1	1	2	25.00

== Honours ==
=== Manager ===
Al Dhafra SC – UAE

- Best Coach of the Round Award

Al Dhafra SC – UAE

- Champions and promotion to Pro League

Al-Nassr

- Saudi Super Cup: 2020

Individual

- Saudi Professional League Manager of the Month: January 2021
