= Badou Ndiaye =

Senegalese footballer (born 1990)

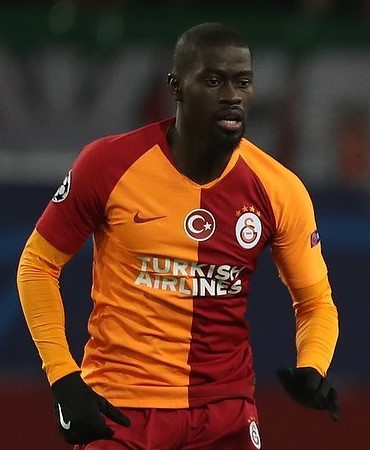
- Badou Ndiaye in a match with Galatasaray against Lokomotiv Moscow in 2018.

Personal information
- Full name: Papa Alioune N'Diaye
- Date of birth: 27 October 1990 (age 36)
- Place of birth: Dakar, Senegal
- Height: 1.79 m (5 ft 10 in)
- Position: Midfielder

Team information
- Current team: Mağusa Türk Gücü
- Number: 26

Senior career*
Years	Team	Apps	(Gls)
2008–2013	Diambars		
2012	→ Bodø/Glimt (loan)	29	(3)
2013–2015	Bodø/Glimt	73	(25)
2015–2017	Osmanlıspor	59	(17)
2017–2018	Galatasaray	17	(1)
2018–2021	Stoke City	27	(2)
2018–2019	→ Galatasaray (loan)	23	(3)
2020	→ Trabzonspor (loan)	17	(1)
2020–2021	→ Fatih Karagümrük (loan)	14	(3)
2021	→ Al-Ain (loan)	13	(2)
2021–2022	Aris Thessaloniki	31	(4)
2022–2024	Adana Demirspor	41	(8)
2024	Pendikspor	11	(1)
2024–2026	Gaziantep	41	(1)
2026–	Mağusa Türk Gücü	0	(0)

International career^{‡}
2014–2020	Senegal	32	(2)
Medal record
Men's football
Representing Senegal
Africa Cup of Nations
Runner-up	2019 Egypt
- * Club domestic league appearances and goals as of 16 June 2025 ‡ National team caps and goals as of 18:42, 25 July 2021 (UTC)

Papa Alioune N'Diaye known as Badou Ndiaye (IPA: [ⁿdʒaj]; born 27 October 1990) is a Senegalese professional footballer who plays as a midfielder for Mağusa Türk Gücü.

Badou began his career with Diambars in his native Senegal before moving to Norwegian side Bodø/Glimt in 2012. After impressing in Norway, he joined Turkish Süper Lig side Osmanlıspor in 2015. He spent two years with Osmanlıspor before joining Galatasaray in August 2017 for a fee of €7.5 million. In January 2018, Badou signed for English Premier League club Stoke City for a fee of £14 million. Following Stoke's relegation in 2017–18, Badou re-joined Galatasaray on loan for the 2018–19 season.

== Club career ==
=== Early career ===
Badou was born in Dakar and grew up in Diamalaye as a son of an army officer and science teacher. Ndiaye began studying for a law degree whilst playing for local side Diambars. After a year into his studies, he decided to pursue a career in football and went on trials at European clubs.

=== Bodø/Glimt ===
After a successful trial with Norwegian club Bodø/Glimt he joined them on initially on loan in 2012. Having moved from Senegal to the Arctic Circle, Ndiaye admitted it was a culture shock.—"When I got up on the first day and opened the front door I was terrified. I had never seen snow before, or at least only on TV. Gradually I learned not to care about the weather. If it’s cold, then it’s cold. I have received that attitude from my parents; it’s important to adapt."

He made his debut in a 3–3 draw against Bærum. Before the 2013 season he signed a contract with Bodø/Glimt. He was awarded the Kniksenprisen prize for the best player in the Norwegian First Division 2013 while the team won promotion. Badou became a fan favorite at the Aspmyra Stadion and played every Tippeligaen match in 2014 as Bodø/Glimt successfully avoided relegation.

=== Osmanlıspor ===
On 5 August 2015, Badou moved to Turkish side Osmanlıspor, for a reported transfer fee of €300,000. Badou scored 11 goals in 33 appearances in 2015–16, helping Osmanlıspor qualify for the UEFA Europa League. In 2016–17 he played 42 times scoring seven goals as the side finished in 13th position and reached the last 32 of the Europa League losing to Olympiacos.

=== Galatasaray ===
On 4 August 2017, he moved to league rivals Galatasaray on a four-year contract, for a reported transfer fee of €7.5 million. Badou made 17 appearances in the first half of the 2017–18 season before he began talking to English clubs.

=== Stoke City ===
Badou joined English Premier League club Stoke City on 31 January 2018 for a fee of £14 million. Badou scored his first goal in English football on 22 April 2018 in a 1–1 draw against Burnley. Badou played 13 times for Stoke in 2017–18 as they were relegated to the EFL Championship. Badou started the first game of the 2018–19 season, a 3–1 defeat away at Leeds United where he was substituted by Gary Rowett and was heavily criticized by supporters for his performance. On 28 August 2018, Badou re-joined Galatasaray on a season-long loan. Badou played 33 times for Galatasaray in 2018–19 helping them win the Süper Lig and Turkish Cup.

After spending the 2018–19 season back at Galatasaray, Badou returned to Stoke in the summer of 2019. After failing to secure a move away he was re-introduced into the side by Nathan Jones for the 2019–20 season. Jones was replaced by Michael O'Neill in November 2019 and Badou fell out of favor. He returned to Turkish football on 4 January 2020 signing on loan with Trabzonspor until the end of the 2019–20 season. He played 23 times for Trabzonspor, helping them finish 2nd in the Süper Lig and win the 2020 Turkish Cup after beating Alanyaspor 2–0 in the final.

Badou joined Fatih Karagümrük on loan for the 2020–21 season. Badou cut his loan with Fatih Karagümrük short in February to join Saudi Professional League side Al-Ain on loan.

=== Aris Thessaloniki ===
On 22 July 2021, Badou joined Greek Super League side Aris Thessaloniki on a three-year contract. On 24 October 2021, he celebrated his first goal for the club in a 5-1 home win against Panetolikos.

=== Mağusa Türk Gücü ===
On 6 August 2026, Ndiaye signed for KTFF Süper Lig club Mağusa Türk Gücü.

== International career ==
In May 2018 he was named in Senegal’s 23-man squad for the 2018 World Cup in Russia.

== Career statistics ==
=== Club ===
As of match played 2 June 2022

Appearances and goals by club, season and competition
Season	Club	League			Cup		League Cup		Other		Total	
Season	Club	Division	Apps	Goals	Apps	Goals	Apps	Goals	Apps	Goals	Apps	Goals
Bodø/Glimt	2012	Norwegian First Division	29	3	4	0	—		—		33	3
Bodø/Glimt	2013	Norwegian First Division	27	12	4	3	—		—		31	15
Bodø/Glimt	2014	Tippeligaen	30	9	2	0	—		—		32	9
Bodø/Glimt	2015	Tippeligaen	16	4	1	0	—		—		17	4
Bodø/Glimt	Total		102	28	11	3	—		—		113	31
Osmanlıspor	2015–16	Süper Lig	33	11	0	0	—		—		33	11
Osmanlıspor	2016–17	Süper Lig	26	6	2	0	—		14 (Note: Appearances in UEFA Europa League)	1	42	7
Osmanlıspor	Total		59	17	2	0	—		14	1	75	18
Galatasaray	2017–18	Süper Lig	17	1	0	0	—		—		17	1
Stoke City	2017–18	Premier League	13	2	0	0	0	0	—		13	2
Stoke City	2018–19	Championship	1	0	0	0	0	0	—		1	0
Stoke City	2019–20	Championship	13	0	0	0	0	0	—		13	0
Stoke City	2020–21	Championship	0	0	0	0	0	0	—		0	0
Stoke City	Total		27	2	0	0	0	0	—		27	2
Galatasaray (loan)	2018–19	Süper Lig	23	3	3	0	—		7 (Note: Five appearances in UEFA Champions League and two appearances in UEFA Europa League)	0	33	3
Trabzonspor (loan)	2019–20	Süper Lig	17	1	6	0	—		—		23	1
Fatih Karagümrük (loan)	2020–21	Süper Lig	14	3	0	0	—		—		14	3
Al-Ain (loan)	2020–21	Saudi Professional League	13	2	1	0	—		—		14	2
Aris Thessaloniki	2021–22	Super League Greece	31	4	4	0	—		—		35	4
Career total			303	31	27	3	0	0	21	1	351	65

=== International ===
As of match played 15 November 2020

National team	Year	Apps	Goals
Senegal	2015	1	0
Senegal	2016	2	0
Senegal	2017	11	1
Senegal	2018	5	0
Senegal	2019	11	1
Senegal	2020	2	0
Total		32	2

Scores and results list Senegal's goal tally first, score column indicates score after each Ndiaye goal.

List of international goals scored by Badou Ndiaye
No.	Date	Venue	Opponent	Score	Result	Competition
1	11 January 2017	Stade Municipal de Kintélé, Brazzaville, Republic of Congo	Congo	2–0	2–0	Friendly
2	17 November 2019	Mavuso Sports Centre, Manzini, Eswatini	Eswatini	4–1	4–1	2021 Africa Cup of Nations qualification

== Honours ==
=== Club ===
Galatasaray

- Süper Lig: 2017–18, 2018–19
- Turkish Cup: 2018–19

Trabzonspor

- Turkish Cup: 2019–20

=== International ===
Senegal

- Africa Cup of Nations runner-up: 2019

Individual

- 1. divisjon Player of the Year: 2013
- Süper Lig Team of the Season: 2022–23
