= Yahya Kabi =

Saudi Arabian footballer

Personal information
- Full name: Yahya Ali Kabi
- Date of birth: July 1, 1987 (age 39)
- Place of birth: Saudi Arabia
- Height: 1.74 m (5 ft 9 in)
- Position: Left-back

Senior career*
Years	Team	Apps	(Gls)
2008–2010	Al-Watani		
2010–2011	Al-Hilal	1	(0)
2011–2012	Al-Fateh	11	(0)
2012–2015	Al-Shoulla	54	(1)
2015–2017	Al-Wehda	20	(0)
2017–2018	Al-Shoulla	29	(1)
2018–2019	Al-Ansar	27	(2)
2019–2021	Al-Ain	53	(0)
2021–2022	Al-Jabalain	30	(0)
2022–2023	Ohod	25	(0)
2023–2024	Neom	22	(0)
- * Club domestic league appearances and goals as of 31 May 2022

Yahya Kabi (Arabic: يحيى كعبي; born 1 July 1987) is a Saudi Arabian football player who currently plays as a left-back.

== Honours ==
=== Club ===
Al-Hilal

- Saudi Professional League (1): 2010-11

Neom

- Saudi Second Division League: 2023–24
