= Omar Al-Sohaymi =

Saudi Arabian footballer

Personal information
- Full name: Omar Salman Al-Sohaymi
- Date of birth: January 17, 1993 (age 33)
- Place of birth: Saudi Arabia
- Height: 1.76 m (5 ft 9 in)
- Position: Midfielder

Team information
- Current team: Hajer
- Number: 70

Youth career
- Al-Nassr

Senior career*
Years	Team	Apps	(Gls)
2012–2013	Vitória S.C.	0	(0)
2013–2014	Louletano	12	(0)
2016–2019	Al-Faisaly	12	(0)
2018	→ Al-Tai (loan)	10	(0)
2019	Abha	1	(0)
2019–2020	Al-Tai	31	(4)
2020–2022	Al-Ain	41	(0)
2022–2023	Al-Batin	0	(0)
2023–2024	Al-Qaisumah	24	(1)
2024–2025	Al-Jeel	26	(0)
2025–2026	Bisha	14	(0)
2026–	Hajer	1	(0)
- * Club domestic league appearances and goals

Omar Al-Sohaymi (Arabic: عمر السحيمي; born 17 January 1993) is a Saudi professional footballer who currently plays as a midfielder for Hajer.

== Career ==
On 20 July 2022, Al-Sohaymi joined Al-Batin on a one-year deal, with an option to extend for another year, from Al-Ain.

On 13 July 2023, Al-Sohaymi joined Al-Qaisumah.

== Honours ==
Abha

- MS League: 2018–19
