= Iago Santos =

Brazilian footballer (born 1992)

Personal information
- Full name: Iago Azevedo dos Santos
- Date of birth: 22 May 1992 (age 34)
- Place of birth: Itaboraí, Brazil
- Height: 1.96 m (6 ft 5 in)
- Position: Defender

Team information
- Current team: Dibba
- Number: 4

Youth career
- 2010–2012: Duque de Caxias

Senior career*
Years	Team	Apps	(Gls)
2012–2013	Duque de Caxias	20	(0)
2014	CSE	13	(0)
2014–2016	Académica	45	(0)
2016–2017	Dibba Al-Hisn	21	(0)
2017–2020	Moreirense	60	(2)
2020–2022	Al-Taawoun	42	(8)
2022–2024	Al-Shabab	70	(2)
2024–2025	Shabab Al Ahli	2	(0)
2025–	Dibba	1	(0)
- * Club domestic league appearances and goals as of 23 May 2024

Iago Azevedo dos Santos (born 22 May 1992), best known as Iago Santos, is a Brazilian professional footballer who plays as a defender for Dibba.

== Career ==
Born in Itaboraí, Brazil, Santos joined Académica in the Primeira Liga on 14 July 2014, arriving from Duque de Caxias. He made his professional debut at 16 August 2014, in a one-all draw against Sporting.

In June 2017, after spending a year in the UAE Division One with Dibba Al-Hisn, He returned to Portugal signing a three-year deal with Moreirense. On 5 July 2020, Iago signed a two-year deal with Al-Taawoun. On 30 January 2022, Iago joined Al-Shabab on a two-and-a-half-year contract.

On 14 August 2024, Santos joined UAE club Shabab Al Ahli.

== Career statistics ==
As of 23 May 2024

Appearances and goals by club, season and competition
Club	Season	League			State League		National cup		League cup		Continental		Other		Total	
Club	Season	Division	Apps	Goals	Apps	Goals	Apps	Goals	Apps	Goals	Apps	Goals	Apps	Goals	Apps	Goals
Duque de Caxias	2012	Série C	0	0	3	0	—		—		—		—		3	0
Duque de Caxias	2013	Série C	17	0	12	0	—		—		—		—		29	0
Duque de Caxias	Total		17	0	15	0	—		—		—		—		32	0
CSE	2014	Campeonato Alagoano	—		13	0	—		—		—		—		13	0
Académica	2014–15	Primeira Liga	28	0	—		0	0	2	0	—		—		30	0
Académica	2015–16	Primeira Liga	17	0	—		1	0	1	0	—		—		19	0
Académica	Total		45	0	—		1	0	3	0	—		—		49	0
Dibba Al-Hisn	2016–17	UAE First Division League	21	0	—		0	0	—		—		—		21	0
Moreirense	2017–18	Primeira Liga	19	1	—		3	0	3	1	—		—		25	2
Moreirense	2018–19	Primeira Liga	16	0	—		1	0	2	1	—		—		19	1
Moreirense	2019–20	Primeira Liga	25	1	—		1	0	1	0	—		—		27	1
Moreirense	Total		60	2	—		5	0	6	2	—		—		71	4
Al-Taawoun	2020–21	Saudi Pro League	25	4	—		4	0	—		5	0	—		34	4
Al-Taawoun	2021–22	Saudi Pro League	17	4	—		1	0	—		—		—		18	4
Al-Taawoun	Total		42	8	—		5	0	—		5	0	—		52	8
Al-Shabab	2021–22	Saudi Pro League	12	0	—		2	0	—		3	0	—		17	0
Al-Shabab	2022–23	Saudi Pro League	28	1	—		1	0	—		—		—		29	1
Al-Shabab	2023–24	Saudi Pro League	30	1	—		2	0	—		—		—		32	1
Al-Shabab	Total		70	2	—		5	0	—		3	0	—		78	2
Career total			255	12	28	0	16	0	9	2	8	0	0	0	316	14
