= Saeed Al-Qarni =

Saudi Arabian footballer

Saeed Al-Qarni سعيد القرني
Personal information
- Full name: Saeed Namshan Al-Qarni
- Date of birth: 3 February 1989 (age 37)
- Place of birth: Saudi Arabia
- Position: Midfielder

Youth career
- Wej

Senior career*
Years	Team	Apps	(Gls)
2010–2017	Wej		
2017–2018	Al-Hazem	19	(0)
2018–2024	Al-Ain		
- * Club domestic league appearances and goals as of 7 December 2020

Saeed Al-Qarni (Arabic: سعيد القرني; born 3 February 1989) is a Saudi Arabian professional footballer who plays as a midfielder.

== Career ==
Al-Qarni started his career at the youth team of Al-Ain and represented the club at every level. On 21 July 2017, joined to Al-Hazem. On 20 July 2018, Al-Qarni joined Al-Ain, Al-Qarni achieved promotion with Al-Ain to the Pro League for the first time in the club's history.
