= Saleh Al-Ohaymid =

Saudi Arabian association football player

Personal information
- Full name: Saleh Abdullah Al-Ohaymid
- Date of birth: 21 May 1998 (age 28)
- Place of birth: Al-Hasa, Saudi Arabia
- Height: 1.84 m (6 ft 0 in)
- Position: Goalkeeper

Team information
- Current team: Al-Raed
- Number: 22

Youth career
- 2012–2014: Al-Nojoom
- 2014–2018: Al-Nassr

Senior career*
Years	Team	Apps	(Gls)
2017–2021	Al-Nassr	1	(0)
2019	→ Abha (loan)	0	(0)
2020–2021	→ Al-Ain (loan)	4	(0)
2021–2024	Al-Ittihad	0	(0)
2023	→ Al-Kholood (loan)	2	(0)
2023–2024	→ Al-Taawoun (loan)	0	(0)
2024–	Al-Raed	0	(0)

International career^{‡}
2016–2018	Saudi Arabia U-20		
2018–2020	Saudi Arabia U-23		
- * Club domestic league appearances and goals as of 11 January 2019 ‡ National team caps and goals as of 11 January 2019

Saleh Al-Ohaymid (Arabic: صالح الوحيمد; born 21 May 1998) is a Saudi Arabian professional footballer who plays as a goalkeeper for Al-Raed.

== Career ==
Al-Ohaymid started his career at Al-Nojoom before joining Al-Nassr on 26 August 2014. On 7 July 2019, Al-Ohaymid joined Abha on loan. However, the loan was cut short just two months later and the player returned to Al-Nassr. On 7 October 2020, Al-Ohaymid joined Al-Ain on loan. On 1 September 2021, Al-Ohaymid joined Al-Ittihad on a three-year deal. On 9 January 2023, Al-Ohaymid joined Al-Kholood on a six-month loan. On 7 September 2023, Al-Ohaymid joined Al-Taawoun on a one-year loan. On 25 August 2024, Al-Ohaymid joined Al-Raed.
