= Nawaf Al-Farshan =

Saudi Arabian association football player

Personal information
- Full name: Nawaf Ibrahim Al-Farshan
- Date of birth: 8 July 1998 (age 28)
- Place of birth: Saudi Arabia
- Height: 1.65 m (5 ft 5 in)
- Position: Midfielder

Youth career
- Al-Nassr

Senior career*
Years	Team	Apps	(Gls)
2018–2021	Al-Nassr	3	(0)
2020	→ Al-Hazem (loan)	0	(0)
2020–2021	→ Al-Ain (loan)	7	(0)
2022	Hajer	16	(0)
2023	Al-Shoulla	4	(0)
2023–2024	Al-Sahel		
2024–2025	Al-Rawdhah	20	(0)
- * Club domestic league appearances and goals as of 20 January 2019 ‡ National team caps and goals as of 20 January 2019

Nawaf Al-Farshan (Arabic: نواف الفرشان; born 8 July 1998) is a Saudi Arabian professional footballer who plays as a midfielder.

== Honours ==
=== Club ===
Al-Nassr

- Saudi Professional League: 2018–19
