= King Saud Sport City Stadium =

Sport City at alBaha region, Saudi Arabia

King Saud Sports City Stadium
- Interactive map of King Saud Sports City Stadium
- Location: City of Al-Bahah, Saudi Arabia
- Coordinates: 20°04′51″N 41°31′28″E
- Operator: Al-Ain; Al-Hejaz
- Capacity: 10,000

Construction
- Opened: 1989

King Saud Sports City (Arabic: مَدِيْنَة ٱلْمَلِك سُعُوْد ٱلرِّيَاضِيَّة, romanized: Madīnat Al-Malik Suʿūd Ar-Riyāḍiyyah) is a multi-use Saudi sports facility which is located in the city of Al-Bahah.

== Description ==
The King Saud Sports City Stadium opened in 1989. The facility has a sports stadium with a 10,000 seat, an indoor pool, a multi-purpose indoor hall and training grounds.

== See also ==
- List of things named after Saudi kings
- List of football stadiums in Saudi Arabia
