= Getterson =

Brazilian footballer (born 1991)

Personal information
- Full name: Getterson Alves dos Santos
- Date of birth: 16 May 1991 (age 35)
- Place of birth: Engenheiro Beltrão, Brazil
- Height: 5 ft 11 in (1.80 m)
- Position: Forward

Team information
- Current team: Al-Ahli Club

Youth career
- 2008–2011: PSTC
- 2009: → Internacional (loan)
- 2010–2011: → Coritiba (loan)
- 2011: → Oeste (loan)

Senior career*
Years	Team	Apps	(Gls)
2011–2012	PSTC		
2011	→ Oeste (loan)	0	(0)
2012	→ Cincão (loan)	?	(9)
2013	Toledo	16	(2)
2013–2017	J. Malucelli	17	(3)
2014	→ Boa Esporte (loan)	0	(0)
2015	→ Volta Redonda (loan)	7	(0)
2016	→ São Paulo (loan)	0	(0)
2016	→ FC Dallas (loan)	4	(0)
2017	Coritiba	10	(0)
2018	Pohang Steelers	9	(0)
2018	Fortaleza	4	(1)
2019–2020	Marítimo	43	(5)
2020–2021	Al-Ain	28	(4)
2021–2022	Chiangrai United	15	(4)
2021–2022	Operário PR	9	(0)
2022–2023	Dhaka Abahani	1	(0)
2023–2024	Sampaio Corrêa	5	(0)
2024	Al-Ahli Club		
2025–	Jacuipense		
- * Club domestic league appearances and goals as of 10 January 2024

Getterson Alves dos Santos (born 16 May 1991), simply known as Getterson, is a Brazilian footballer who plays as a forward for Campeonato Baiano club Jacuipense.

== Career ==
Getterson began his career in 2011 with Oeste, and later moving to Toledo in 2013. He signed with J. Malucelli later in the year. In June 2016, Getterson was loaned to São Paulo, but hours after the signing was announced, the contract was terminated after fans found disparaging remarks he had made four-years earlier about São Paulo fans on his, now idle, Twitter account. He had also proclaimed himself a fan of the club's rivals Corinthians, He was later loaned to Major League Soccer side FC Dallas on 9 July 2016.

On 20 January 2019, Getterson signed a contract with Marítimo.

On 13 October 2020, Getterson signed a contract with Al-Ain.

On 8 November 2022, he joined Bangladesh Premier League club Dhaka Abahani. However, he left the club after six months without completing the season.
