= 2024–25 Al-Nassr FC season =

Al-Nassr
2024–25 season
- President: Ibrahim Al-Muhaidib (until 21 August) Abdullah Al-Majid (from 28 October)
- Head coach: Luís Castro (until 17 September); Stefano Pioli (from 18 September)
- Stadium: Al-Awwal Park
- Pro League: 3rd
- King's Cup: Round of 16
- AFC Champions League Elite: Semi-finals
- Super Cup: Runners-up
- Top goalscorer: League: Cristiano Ronaldo (25); All: Cristiano Ronaldo (35)
- Highest home attendance: 25,490 vs Al-Hilal (1 November 2024, SPL)
- Lowest home attendance: 5,889 vs Al-Khaleej (21 May 2025, SPL)
- Average home league attendance: 16,292
Home colours	Away colours	Third colours

The 2024–25 season was Al-Nassr's 49th consecutive season in the top flight of Saudi football and 69th year in existence as a football club. The club participated in the Pro League, the King's Cup, the AFC Champions League Elite, and the Super Cup.

The season covers the period from 1 July 2024 to 30 June 2025.

== Overview ==
This season saw the departure of Abdullah Madu who had been at the club for 17 years.

On 17 September, Al-Nassr terminated the contract of head coach Luís Castro following a slow start to the season.

On 1 January 2025, Majid Al-Jam'an replaced Guido Fienga as the club's Executive Director with Fienga becoming the club advisor.

Al-Nassr sold Seko Fofana in the winter window for €20,000,000 to the French side Rennes, making it the biggest sale outside the Saudi Pro League, although higher sales have been made within the league itself.

== Players ==
=== First-team squad ===
As of 31 January 2025

Note: Flags indicate national team as defined under FIFA eligibility rules; some limited exceptions apply. Players may hold more than one non-FIFA nationality.

No.	Pos.	Nation	Player
2	DF	KSA	Sultan Al-Ghannam (vice-captain)
3	DF	FRA	Mohamed Simakan
4	DF	KSA	Mohammed Al-Fatil
7	FW	POR	Cristiano Ronaldo (captain)
8	MF	KSA	Abdulmajeed Al-Sulaiheem
9	FW	COL	Jhon Durán
10	FW	SEN	Sadio Mané
11	MF	CRO	Marcelo Brozović
12	DF	KSA	Nawaf Boushal
16	FW	KSA	Mohammed Maran
17	MF	KSA	Abdullah Al-Khaibari
19	MF	KSA	Ali Al-Hassan
20	MF	BRA	Ângelo Gabriel
22	GK	KSA	Ahmed Al-Rehaili (on loan from Al-Ettifaq)
23	MF	KSA	Ayman Yahya
24	GK	BRA	Bento

No.	Pos.	Nation	Player
25	MF	POR	Otávio
27	DF	ESP	Aymeric Laporte
29	MF	KSA	Abdulrahman Ghareeb
36	GK	KSA	Raghed Al-Najjar
50	DF	KSA	Majed Qasheesh
51	FW	KSA	Abdulrahman Al-Enazi ^{U19}
54	FW	KSA	Faris Salem ^{U19}
58	DF	KSA	Mohammed Hazazi ^{U19}
60	FW	KSA	Saad Haqawi ^{U19}
61	GK	KSA	Mubarak Al-Buainain ^{U19}
70	DF	KSA	Awad Aman ^{U19}
71	MF	KSA	Mubarak Al-Dawsari ^{U19}
78	DF	KSA	Ali Lajami
80	MF	BRA	Wesley
83	DF	KSA	Salem Al-Najdi
—	MF	KSA	Bassam Hazazi ^{U19}

=== Other players under contract ===
Note: Flags indicate national team as defined under FIFA eligibility rules; some limited exceptions apply. Players may hold more than one non-FIFA nationality.

No. / Pos. / Nation / Player; 14 / MF / KSA / Sami Al-Najei	No. / Pos. / Nation / Player; — / DF / KSA / Hamad Al Mansour

=== Out on loan ===
Note: Flags indicate national team as defined under FIFA eligibility rules; some limited exceptions apply. Players may hold more than one non-FIFA nationality.

No.	Pos.	Nation	Player
1	GK	KSA	Amin Bukhari (on loan to Damac)
5	DF	KSA	Abdulelah Al-Amri (on loan to Al-Ittihad)
30	FW	KSA	Meshari Al-Nemer (on loan to Damac)
38	MF	KSA	Fahad Al-Taleb (on loan to Al-Najma)
42	DF	KSA	Mansour Al-Shammari (on loan to Al-Jubail)
44	GK	KSA	Nawaf Al-Aqidi (on loan to Al-Fateh)
46	MF	KSA	Abdulaziz Al-Aliwa (on loan to Al-Ettifaq)

No.	Pos.	Nation	Player
55	DF	KSA	Abdulaziz Al-Faraj (on loan to Al-Tai)
57	FW	KSA	Muhannad Barah (on loan to Al-Saqer)
66	DF	KSA	Waleed Saber (on loan to Al-Jeel)
92	FW	KSA	Fahad Al-Zubaidi (on loan to Al-Orobah)
99	DF	KSA	Aser Hawsawi (on loan to Al-Jubail)
—	MF	KSA	Rakan Al-Ghamdi (on loan to Jong NEC)

== Technical staff ==
Position	Name
Manager	(Italy) Stefano Pioli
Assistant Manager	(Italy) Francesco Conti
First Team Coach	(Italy) Giacomo Murelli
Goalkeeping Coach	(Spain) Tony Mingual
Technical Coach	(Italy) Luciano Vulcano
Physiotherapist	(Italy) Roberto Morosi
Head Doctor	(Portugal) Carlos Miguel
Youth Coach	(Croatia) Ivan Matić
Youth Coach	(Croatia) Džemal Adilji
Video Analyst	(Italy) Gianmarco Pioli
Match Analyst	(Italy) Jesse Fioranelli
Sporting Director	(Spain) Fernando Hierro
Assistant Sporting Director & Head of Scouts Department	(Spain) Adrián Espárraga
Executive Director	(Saudi Arabia) Majid Al-Jam'an
Talent Scouting	(Portugal) Marcelo Salazar
Chief Scout	(Spain) Rafa Gil
Director of football	(Saudi Arabia) Omar Hawsawi
Club advisor	(Italy) Guido Fienga

== Transfers and loans ==
=== Transfers in ===
Entry date	Position	No.	Player	From club	Fee	Ref.
30 June 2024	GK	1	(Saudi Arabia) Amin Bukhari	(Saudi Arabia) Al-Ettifaq	End of loan	
30 June 2024	DF	3	(Saudi Arabia) Abdullah Madu	(Saudi Arabia) Al-Ettifaq	End of loan	
30 June 2024	DF	13	(Ivory Coast) Ghislain Konan	(Saudi Arabia) Al-Fayha	End of loan	
30 June 2024	DF	20	(Saudi Arabia) Hamad Al Mansour	(Saudi Arabia) Al-Okhdood	End of loan	
30 June 2024	DF	42	(Saudi Arabia) Mansour Al-Shammari	(Saudi Arabia) Al-Jabalain	End of loan	
30 June 2024	DF	50	(Saudi Arabia) Majed Qasheesh	(Saudi Arabia) Al-Hazem	End of loan	
30 June 2024	DF	58	(Saudi Arabia) Aser Hawsawi	(Saudi Arabia) Jeddah	End of loan	
30 June 2024	DF	59	(Saudi Arabia) Yousef Haqawi	(Saudi Arabia) Al-Fayha	End of loan	
30 June 2024	MF	6	(Ivory Coast) Seko Fofana	(Saudi Arabia) Al-Ettifaq	End of loan	
30 June 2024	MF	21	(Saudi Arabia) Mukhtar Ali	(Saudi Arabia) Al-Fateh	End of loan	
30 June 2024	FW	56	(Saudi Arabia) Fahad Al-Zubaidi	(Saudi Arabia) Al-Orobah	End of loan	
18 July 2024	GK	24	(Brazil) Bento	(Brazil) Athletico Paranaense	$19,650,000	
15 August 2024	DF	83	(Saudi Arabia) Salem Al-Najdi	(Saudi Arabia) Al-Fateh	$4,800,000	
30 August 2024	FW	80	(Brazil) Wesley	(Brazil) Corinthians	$19,900,000	
2 September 2024	DF	3	(France) Mohamed Simakan	(Germany) RB Leipzig	$38,800,000	
3 September 2024	FW	20	(Brazil) Ângelo Gabriel	(England) Chelsea	$25,500,000	
29 January 2025	MF	–	(Saudi Arabia) Bassam Hazazi	(Saudi Arabia) Al-Ettifaq	Swap	
31 January 2025	FW	9	(Colombia) Jhon Durán	(England) Aston Villa	$80,000,000	

Total expenditure: ▼$188.65 million

=== Loans in ===
Start date	End date	Position	No.	Player	From club	Fee	Ref.
31 January 2025	End of season	GK	–	(Saudi Arabia) Ahmed Al-Rehaili	(Saudi Arabia) Al-Ettifaq	None	

=== Transfers out ===
Exit date	Position	No.	Player	To club	Fee	Ref.
30 June 2024	DF	22	(Australia) Aziz Behich	(Australia) Melbourne City	End of loan	
1 July 2024	GK	26	(Colombia) David Ospina	(Colombia) Atlético Nacional	Free	
8 July 2024	DF	24	(Saudi Arabia) Mohammed Qassem	(Saudi Arabia) Al-Qadsiah	Free	
13 July 2024	DF	69	(Saudi Arabia) Marzouq Tombakti	(Saudi Arabia) Al-Riyadh	Free	
16 July 2024	GK	33	(Saudi Arabia) Waleed Abdullah	(Saudi Arabia) Al-Diriyah	Free	
30 July 2024	DF	3	(Saudi Arabia) Abdullah Madu	(Saudi Arabia) Al-Ettifaq	Undisclosed	
2 August 2024	GK	37	(Saudi Arabia) Faris Afandy	(Saudi Arabia) Al-Zulfi	Free	
3 August 2024	DF	59	(Saudi Arabia) Yousef Haqawi	(Saudi Arabia) Al-Ula	Free	
11 August 2024	MF	31	(Saudi Arabia) Mohammed Sahlouli	(Saudi Arabia) Al-Riyadh	$133,000	
3 September 2024	DF	13	(Brazil) Alex Telles	(Brazil) Botafogo	Released	
7 September 2024	DF	3	(Ivory Coast) Ghislain Konan	(Spain) Burgos	Released	
1 January 2025	MF	–	(Ivory Coast) Seko Fofana	(France) Rennes	$20,700,000	
28 January 2025	MF	94	(Brazil) Talisca	(Turkey) Fenerbahçe	$6,125,000	
29 January 2025	MF	6	(Saudi Arabia) Mukhtar Ali	(Saudi Arabia) Al-Ettifaq	Swap	

Total income: ▲$26.958 million

=== Loans out ===
Start date	End date	Position	No.	Player	To club	Fee	Ref.
23 July 2024	End of season	FW	56	(Saudi Arabia) Fahad Al-Zubaidi	(Saudi Arabia) Al-Orobah	None	
6 August 2024	End of season	MF	46	(Saudi Arabia) Abdulaziz Al-Aliwa	(Saudi Arabia) Al-Ettifaq	None	
24 August 2024	End of season	DF	55	(Saudi Arabia) Abdulaziz Al-Faraj	(Saudi Arabia) Al-Tai	None	
1 September 2024	End of season	DF	5	(Saudi Arabia) Abdulelah Al-Amri	(Saudi Arabia) Al-Ittihad	Undisclosed	
2 September 2024	End of season	FW	30	(Saudi Arabia) Meshari Al-Nemer	(Saudi Arabia) Damac	None	
3 September 2024	End of season	GK	1	(Saudi Arabia) Amin Bukhari	(Saudi Arabia) Damac	None	
4 September 2024	End of season	MF	_	(Saudi Arabia) Rakan Al-Ghamdi	(Netherlands) NEC U21	None	
11 September 2024	End of season	MF	38	(Saudi Arabia) Fahad Al-Taleb	(Saudi Arabia) Al-Najma	None	
13 September 2024	End of season	DF	42	(Saudi Arabia) Mansour Al-Shammari	(Saudi Arabia) Al-Jubail	None	
13 September 2024	End of season	DF	58	(Saudi Arabia) Aser Hawsawi	(Saudi Arabia) Al-Jubail	None	
25 September 2024	End of season	DF	–	(Saudi Arabia) Waleed Saber	(Saudi Arabia) Al-Jeel	None	
26 September 2024	End of season	FW	–	(Saudi Arabia) Muhannad Barrah	(Saudi Arabia) Al-Saqer	None	
31 January 2025	End of season	GK	44	(Saudi Arabia) Nawaf Al-Aqidi	(Saudi Arabia) Al-Fateh	None	

== Pre-season and friendlies ==
14 July 2024 Friendly	Al-Nassr (Saudi Arabia)	1–1	(Portugal) Louletano	Albufeira, Portugal
11:00 WEST	Maran 52'	Report	40'	Stadium: Estádio Municipal de Albufeira

19 July 2024 Friendly	Al-Nassr (Saudi Arabia)	1–0	(Portugal) Marítimo	Albufeira, Portugal
20:30 WEST	Telles 22'	Report		Stadium: Estádio Municipal de Albufeira

20 July 2024 Friendly	Al-Nassr (Saudi Arabia)	1–1	(Portugal) Farense	Faro, Portugal
20:00 WEST	Talisca 32'	Report	Barbosa 37' (pen.)	Stadium: Estádio de São Luís

24 July 2024 Friendly	Al-Nassr (Saudi Arabia)	0–1	(Portugal) Portimonense	Portimão Portugal
20:00 WEST		Report	Varela 90+3'	Stadium: Estádio Municipal de Portimão

28 July 2024 Friendly	Al-Nassr (Saudi Arabia)	0–4	(Portugal) Porto	Porto, Portugal
18:30 WEST		Report	González 18', 31'; Jaime 21'; Borges 45+5' (pen.)	Stadium: Estádio do Dragão; Attendance: 47,000

30 July 2024 Friendly	Al-Nassr (Saudi Arabia)	0–0	(Portugal) Lusitano	Albufeira, Portugal
19:00 WEST		Report		Stadium: Estádio Municipal de Albufeira

4 August 2024 Friendly	Al-Nassr (Saudi Arabia)	0–1	(Spain) Granada	La Línea, Spain
19:30 CEST		Report	Boyé 45+1'	Stadium: Estadio Municipal de La Línea de la Concepción

8 August 2024 Friendly	Al-Nassr (Saudi Arabia)	0–3	(Spain) Almería	Almería, Spain
20:30 CEST		Report	Lajami 35' (o.g.); Suárez 41'; Montes 60'	Stadium: Power Horse Stadium

== Competitions ==
=== Overview ===
Competition	Record							
Competition	Pld	W	D	L	GF	GA	GD	Win %
Pro League	34	21	7	6	80	38	+42	61.76
King's Cup	2	1	0	1	2	2	+0	50.00
Champions League Elite	12	7	3	2	26	10	+16	58.33
Super Cup	2	1	0	1	3	4	−1	50.00
Total	50	30	10	10	111	54	+57	60.00

Source: Competitions

=== Pro League ===
==== League table ====
Pos	Team	Pld	W	D	L	GF	GA	GD	Pts	Qualification or relegation
1	Al-Ittihad (C)	34	26	5	3	79	35	+44	83	Qualification for AFC Champions League Elite League stage
2	Al-Hilal	34	23	6	5	95	41	+54	75	Qualification for AFC Champions League Elite League stage
3	Al-Nassr	34	21	7	6	80	38	+42	70	Qualification for AFC Champions League Two group stage (Note: Since the winners of the 2024–25 King's Cup, Al-Ittihad, had already qualified for the Champions League Elite, the spot given to the King's Cup winners (Champions League Two) was passed to the third-placed team.)
4	Al-Qadsiah	34	21	5	8	53	31	+22	68	
5	Al-Ahli	34	21	4	9	69	36	+33	67	Qualification for AFC Champions League Elite League stage (Note: By virtue of winning 2024–25 AFC Champions League Elite.)

Source: SPL
Rules for classification: 1) Points; 2) Head-to-head points; 3) Head-to-head goal difference; 4) Total goal difference; 5) Total goals scored; 6) Fair-play points
(Note: Head-to-head record is used only after all the matches between the teams in question have been played).
(C) Champions

==== Results summary ====
Overall								Home						Away					
Pld	W	D	L	GF	GA	GD	Pts	W	D	L	GF	GA	GD	W	D	L	GF	GA	GD
34	21	7	6	80	38	+42	70	9	5	3	34	18	+16	12	2	3	46	20	+26

Source: Saudi Pro League

==== Results by round ====
Round	1	2	3	4	5	6	7	8	9	10	11	12	13	14	15	16	17	18	19	20	21	22	23	24	25	26	27	28	29	30	31	32	33	34
Ground	H	A	H	A	H	H	A	A	H	A	H	H	A	H	A	A	H	A	H	A	H	A	A	H	H	A	H	A	A	H	A	H	H	A
Result	D	W	D	W	W	W	W	D	D	W	L	W	L	W	D	W	W	W	W	W	L	W	W	D	W	W	W	L	W	L	W	D	W	L
Position	10	5	7	5	4	3	3	3	3	3	3	3	4	3	4	4	4	3	3	3	4	3	4	4	3	3	3	3	3	4	3	4	4	3
Points	1	4	5	8	11	14	17	18	19	22	22	25	25	28	29	32	35	38	41	44	44	47	50	51	54	57	60	60	63	63	66	67	70	70

Source: Saudi Pro League
A = Away; H = Home; W = Win; D = Draw; L = Loss

==== Matches ====
All times are local, AST (UTC+3).

Win Draw Loss Postponed

22 August 2024 1	Al-Nassr	1–1	Al-Raed	Riyadh
21:00	Ronaldo 34'; Brozović (yellow card) 45+6'; Laporte (yellow card) 48'; Al-Ghannam (yellow card) 90+3'	Report	Al-Rajeh (yellow card) 16'; Al-Subaie (yellow card) 20'; M. Al-Dossari (yellow card) 27'; Fouzair 49' (pen.); Gonzalez (yellow card) 56'; Al-Sahli (yellow card) 90+9'	Stadium: Al-Awwal Park; Attendance: 8,951; Referee: Khaled Al-Teris

27 August 2024 2	Al-Fayha	1–4	Al-Nassr	Buraidah
21:00	R. Kaabi (yellow card) 18'; Al-Hussain (yellow card) 30'; Sakala 86'	Report	Talisca 5', 90+5'; Ronaldo 45+10'; Brozović 85'	Stadium: King Abdullah Sports City; Attendance: 4,195; Referee: Majed Al-Shamrani

13 September 2024 3	Al-Nassr	1–1	Al-Ahli	Riyadh
21:00	Lajami (yellow card) 90+7'; Al-Hurayji 90+9' (o.g.)	Report	Al-Johani (yellow card) 28'; Kessié 57', (yellow card) 90+11'; Al-Hurayji (yellow card) 83'	Stadium: Al-Awwal Park; Attendance: 23,644; Referee: Sergei Karasev (Russia)

20 September 2024 4	Al-Ettifaq	0–3	Al-Nassr	Dammam
21:00	Fofana (yellow card) 49'; Dembélé (yellow card) 88'	Report	Ronaldo 33' (pen.); Al-Najdi 56'; Talisca 70'; Ali (yellow card) 87'	Stadium: Al-Ettifaq Club Stadium; Attendance: 9,390; Referee: Serdar Gözübüyük (Netherlands)

27 September 2024 5	Al-Nassr	2–0	Al-Wehda	Riyadh
18:20	Ângelo 41'; Otávio (yellow card) 45+4'; Ronaldo 56' (pen.); Bento (yellow card) 74'; Al-Hassan (yellow card) 90+4'	Report	Bakshween (yellow card) 23' (yellow-red card) 86'	Stadium: Al-Awwal Park; Attendance: 14,758; Referee: Bastian Dankert (Germany)

5 October 2024 6	Al-Nassr	3–0	Al-Orobah	Riyadh
18:15	Ronaldo 17' (pen.); Mané 29', 71'	Report	Al-Maqati (yellow card) 60'	Stadium: Al-Awwal Park; Attendance: 14,018; Referee: Yael Falcón Pérez (Argentina)

18 October 2024 7	Al-Shabab	1–2	Al-Nassr	Riyadh
21:00	Bonaventura (yellow card) 28'; Al-Sibyani (yellow card) 45'; Al-Hassan 90' (o.g.); Hamdallah (yellow card) 90+5'	Report	Al-Najdi (yellow card) 31'; Talisca (yellow card) 50'; Laporte 69'; Lajami (yellow card) 79'; Simakan (yellow card) 90+5' (yellow-red card) 90+12'; Ronaldo 90+7' (pen.)	Stadium: Al-Shabab Club Stadium; Attendance: 10,760; Referee: Darío Herrera (Argentina)

25 October 2024 8	Al-Kholood	3–3	Al-Nassr	Buraidah
18:05	Maolida 12', 28'; Muleka (yellow card) 68', (goal) 71'; Al-Shehri (yellow card) 74'; Grohe (yellow card) 90+8'	Report	Laporte 16'; Talisca 24', 90+5' (pen.); Brozović (yellow card) 73'; Al-Khaibari (yellow card) 83'	Stadium: King Abdullah Sports City; Attendance: 3,856; Referee: Georgi Kabakov (Bulgaria)

1 November 2024 9	Al-Nassr	1–1	Al-Hilal	Riyadh
21:00	Talisca 1'; Brozović (yellow card) 20'; Mané (yellow card) 43'; Ronaldo (yellow card) 45+1'; Al-Khaibari (yellow card) 52'; Otávio (yellow card) 84'	Report	Malcom (yellow card) 57'; Kanno (yellow card) 60'; Milinković-Savić 77'; Al-Bulaihi (yellow card) 82'; N. Al-Dawsari (yellow card) 90+4'	Stadium: Al-Awwal Park; Attendance: 25,490; Referee: Felix Zwayer (Germany)

8 November 2024 10	Al-Riyadh	0–1	Al-Nassr	Riyadh
20:00	Bayesh (yellow card) 38'; Al-Khaibari (yellow card) 51'	Report	Mané 41'; Haqawi (yellow card) 90+1'	Stadium: Prince Faisal bin Fahd Sports City; Attendance: 6,822; Referee: Nikola Dabanović (Montenegro)

22 November 2024 11	Al-Nassr	1–2	Al-Qadsiah	Riyadh
20:00	Ronaldo 32'; Maran (yellow card) 81'	Report	Quiñones 37', (yellow card) 66'; Thakri (yellow card) 45'; Aubameyang 50'; Nández (yellow card) 82'	Stadium: Al-Awwal Park; Attendance: 18,471; Referee: Sergey Ivanov (Russia)

29 November 2024 12	Al-Nassr	2–0	Damac	Riyadh
17:40	Ronaldo 17' (pen.), 79'; Mané (yellow card) 26'; Boushal (yellow card) 75'	Report	Hawsawi (yellow card) 36'; Bedrane (red card) 56'; Al-Anazi (yellow card) 76'; Al-Nemer (yellow card) 90+3'	Stadium: Al-Awwal Park; Attendance: 13,481; Referee: Benoît Bastien (France)

6 December 2024 13	Al-Ittihad	2–1	Al-Nassr	Jeddah
20:00	Benzema 55', (yellow card) 67'; Pereira (yellow card) 59'; Bergwijn (yellow card) 64', (goal) 90+1'	Report	Brozović (yellow card) 24'; Al-Ghannam (yellow card) 42'; Ronaldo 57'; Otávio (yellow card) 67'	Stadium: King Abdullah Sports City; Attendance: 55,120; Referee: Facundo Tello (Argentina)

9 January 2025 14	Al-Nassr	3–1	Al-Okhdood	Riyadh
20:00	Laporte (yellow card) 8'; Mané 29', 88'; Ronaldo 42' (pen.); Al-Ghannam (yellow card) 70'	Report	Godwin 6'; Lowe (yellow card) 34'	Stadium: Al-Awwal Park; Attendance: 16,458; Referee: Mario Escobar (Guatemala)

17 January 2025 15	Al-Taawoun	1–1	Al-Nassr	Buraidah
20:00	Al-Nasser 45+5'; Adam (yellow card) 79'	Report	Al-Hassan (yellow card) 37'; Brozović (yellow card) 40'; Laporte 64'; Boushal (yellow card) 70'; Maran (yellow card) 90+11'	Stadium: King Abdullah Sports City; Attendance: 13,819; Referee: Wilmar Roldán (Colombia)

21 January 2025 16	Al-Khaleej	1–3	Al-Nassr	Dammam
17:50	Aboulshamat (yellow card) 23'; Al Hamsal (red card) 34'; Hawsawi (yellow card) 64'; Fortounis 80' (pen.); Martins (yellow card) 82'; Rebocho (yellow card) 90+6'	Report	Boushal (yellow card) 45+5'; Ronaldo 65', 90+8'; Al-Najdi (yellow card) 76'; Al-Ghannam 81'; Simakan (yellow card) 84'; Al-Khaibari (yellow card) 90+5'	Stadium: Prince Mohamed bin Fahd Stadium; Attendance: 13,432; Referee: Anastasios Sidiropoulos (Greece)

26 January 2025 17	Al-Nassr	3–1	Al-Fateh	Riyadh
20:00	Saâdane 41' (o.g.); Ronaldo (yellow card) 55', (goal) 87'; Simakan 57'	Report	Saâdane (yellow card) 56'; Baattiah (yellow card) 61'; Batna 72'	Stadium: Al-Awwal Park; Attendance: 12,804; Referee: Andris Treimanis (Latvia)

30 January 2025 18	Al-Raed	1–2	Al-Nassr	Buraidah
20:00	Abeid (yellow card) 45+2'; Al-Rajeh (yellow card) 45+4'; Sayoud 76', (yellow card) 90+5'	Report	Ângelo (yellow card) 2'; Ronaldo 35'; Brozović (yellow card) 44'; Boushal 47'; Al-Ghannam (yellow card) 69'; Bento (yellow card) 86'; Al-Sulaiheem (yellow card) 87'; Al-Hassan (yellow card) 90+10'	Stadium: King Abdullah Sports City; Attendance: 9,165; Referee: Donatas Rumšas (Lithuania)

7 February 2025 19	Al-Nassr	3–0	Al-Fayha	Riyadh
18:20	Durán 22', 72'; Boushal (yellow card) 51'; Mané (yellow card) 54'; Brozović (yellow card) 67'; Ronaldo 74'	Report	Al-Sahafi (yellow card) 35'	Stadium: Al-Awwal Park; Attendance: 20,207; Referee: Nikola Dabanović (Montenegro)

13 February 2025 20	Al-Ahli	2–3	Al-Nassr	Jeddah
20:30	Majrashi (yellow card) 45+4'; Al-Johani (yellow card) 59'; Toney 78'; Ibañez (yellow card) 90+3'; Al-Nabit 90+8'	Report	Durán 32', 88', (yellow card) 88'; Simakan (red card) 47'; Yahya 80'; Al-Fatil (yellow card) 90+9'	Stadium: Alinma Stadium; Attendance: 50,144; Referee: César Arturo Ramos (Mexico)

21 February 2025 21	Al-Nassr	2–3	Al-Ettifaq	Riyadh
20:00	Yahya 47'; Brozović (yellow card) 54'; Al-Fatil 65'; Durán (red card) 90'	Report	Wijnaldum 55', 89'; Al-Otaibi (yellow card) 61'; Al-Fatil 82' (o.g.); Al-Malki (yellow card) 90+1'; Bamsaud (yellow card) 90+7'	Stadium: Al-Awwal Park; Attendance: 24,626; Referee: Kirill Levnikov (Russia)

25 February 2025 22	Al-Wehda	0–2	Al-Nassr	Mecca
20:00	Al-Alaeli (yellow card) 68'; Al-Eisa (yellow card) 86'; El Yamiq (yellow card) 90+6'	Report	Ronaldo 48'; Al-Najdi (yellow card) 70'; Mané 90+10' (pen.)	Stadium: King Abdulaziz Sports City; Attendance: 14,679; Referee: Harm Osmers (Germany)

28 February 2025 23	Al-Orobah	0–3; Awarded (Note: Al-Nassr were awarded a 3–0 win due to Al-Orobah fielding an ineligible player. The original match had ended in a 2–1 win for Al-Orobah.)	Al-Nassr	Sakakah
22:00	Al Somah 40', (yellow card) 88'; Guðmundsson 65'; Al-Maqati (yellow card) 80'	Report	Qasheesh (yellow card) 34'; Boushal 51'; Brozović (yellow card) 52'	Stadium: Al Jouf University Stadium; Attendance: 7,527; Referee: Maximiliano Ramírez (Argentina)
Note: On 25 May 2025, Al-Nassr were awarded a 3–0 win due to Al-Orobah fielding ineligible player Rafea Al-Ruwaili. The match originally finished 2–1 to Al-Orobah.

7 March 2025 24	Al-Nassr	2–2	Al-Shabab	Riyadh
22:00	Simakan (yellow card) 37'; Yahya 45+2'; Ronaldo 45+7'; Al-Fatil (red card) 52'; Durán (yellow card) 87'	Report	Leandrinho (yellow card) 12'; Hamdallah 44' (pen.); Al-Shuwayrikh 67', (yellow card) 90+6'; Hoedt (yellow card) 87'	Stadium: Al-Awwal Park; Attendance: 15,316; Referee: Facundo Tello (Argentina)

14 March 2025 25	Al-Nassr	3–1	Al-Kholood	Riyadh
22:00	Ronaldo 4'; Mané 26'; Durán 41'; Lajami (yellow card) 46'; Boushal (yellow card) 47' (yellow-red card) 56'	Report	Lajami 72' (o.g.); F. Al-Shamrani (yellow card) 79'	Stadium: Al-Awwal Park; Attendance: 12,492; Referee: Faisal Al-Blwi

4 April 2025 26	Al-Hilal	1–3	Al-Nassr	Riyadh
21:00	Neves (yellow card) 54'; Al-Bulaihi 62'	Report	Al-Hassan 45+4'; Ronaldo 47', 88' (pen.)	Stadium: Kingdom Arena; Attendance: 25,187; Referee: Georgi Kabakov (Bulgaria)

12 April 2025 27	Al-Nassr	2–1	Al-Riyadh	Riyadh
21:00	Durán (yellow card) 19'; Ronaldo 56', 64'; Ângelo (yellow card) 87'	Report	Selemani 45+2'; Mensah (yellow card) 59'; Al-Khaibari (yellow card) 80'; Bayesh (yellow card) 82'; Assiri (red card) 90+4'; Tambakti (yellow card) 90+12'	Stadium: Al-Awwal Park; Attendance: 16,304; Referee: Erik Lambrechts (Belgium)

18 April 2025 28	Al-Qadsiah	2–1	Al-Nassr	Dammam
21:00	Fernández (yellow card) 25'; Nacho (yellow card) 27'; Al-Ammar 35', (yellow card) 76'; Nández (yellow card) 39'; Álvarez (yellow card) 53'; Aboulshamat (yellow card) 75'; Aubameyang 87'	Report	Mané (yellow card) 30', (goal) 84'; Al-Ghannam (yellow card) 45+1'; Boushal (yellow card) 80'	Stadium: Prince Mohamed bin Fahd Stadium; Attendance: 17,368; Referee: Szymon Marciniak (Poland)

22 April 2025 29	Damac	2–3	Al-Nassr	Abha
21:00	Solan 18'; Al-Nemer (yellow card) 43'; Al-Sibyani (yellow card) 45+3'; Bedrane (yellow card) 56'; Stanciu 73'	Report	Laporte 25'; Al-Najdi (yellow card) 39'; Boushal (yellow card) 57'; Durán (yellow card) 65'; Al-Hassan 70'; Al-Ghannam (yellow card) 85', (goal) 90+4'	Stadium: Prince Sultan bin Abdulaziz Sports City; Attendance: 12,068; Referee: Tamás Bognár (Hungary)

7 May 2025 30	Al-Nassr	2–3	Al-Ittihad	Riyadh
21:00	Mané 3'; Yahya 37'; Al-Hassan (yellow card) 61'; Al-Khaibari (yellow card) 90+7'	Report	Benzema 49'; Kanté 52'; Pereira (yellow card) 67'; Fabinho (yellow card) 90+3'; Al-Amri (yellow card) 90+3'; Bergwijn (yellow card) 90+7'; Diaby (red card) 90+7'	Stadium: Al-Awwal Park; Attendance: 24,575; Referee: Danny Makkelie (Netherlands)

12 May 2025 31	Al-Okhdood	0–9	Al-Nassr	Najran
21:00	Vítor (red card) 47'	Report	Yahya 16'; Durán 20', 52'; Brozović 27', (yellow card) 68'; Al-Sulaiheem (yellow card) 42'; Mané 45+6' (pen.), 59', 64', 74'; Maran 90+4' (pen.)	Stadium: Prince Hathloul bin Abdulaziz Sports City; Attendance: 3,861; Referee: Anastasios Sidiropoulos (Greece)

16 May 2025 32	Al-Nassr	1–1	Al-Taawoun	Riyadh
21:00	Yahya (yellow card) 47'; Otávio 51'; Brozović (yellow card) 59'; Wesley (yellow card) 90+1'	Report	Mahzari (yellow card) 45+2'; Martínez 70'	Stadium: Al-Awwal Park; Attendance: 9,488; Referee: Rafael Klein (Brazil)

21 May 2025 33	Al-Nassr	2–0	Al-Khaleej	Riyadh
19:10	Durán 75'; Brozović (yellow card) 90+2'; Ronaldo 90+7' (pen.)	Report	Aboulshamat (yellow card) 90+2'; Ozaybi (yellow card) 90+5'	Stadium: Al-Awwal Park; Attendance: 5,889; Referee: Daniel Siebert (Germany)

26 May 2025 34	Al-Fateh	3–2	Al-Nassr	Al-Hasa
21:00	Vargas 45+4'; Masoud (yellow card) 53'; Batna 81', (yellow card) 83'; Saâdane (yellow card) 90+3'; Machado 90+6', (yellow card) 90+7'	Report	Ronaldo 42'; Al-Sulaiheem (yellow card) 45+1'; Yahya (yellow card) 54'; Mané 75'; Al-Najdi (yellow card) 79'	Stadium: Al-Fateh Club Stadium; Attendance: 9,512; Referee: Szymon Marciniak (Poland)

=== King's Cup ===
All times are local, AST (UTC+3).

23 September 2024 Round of 32	Al-Hazem	1–2	Al-Nassr	Buraidah
18:35	Al-Samti (yellow card) 5'; Al-Dhuwayhi (yellow card) 33'; Al-Dakheel (yellow card) 45+2'; Gaari (yellow card) 57'; Al-Sayyali 62'; Al-Nakhli (yellow card) 64'	Report	Mané 45+6', (yellow card) 57'; Boushal 90+2'	Stadium: King Abdullah Sports City; Attendance: 2,361; Referee: Daniel Siebert (Germany)

29 October 2024 Round of 16	Al-Nassr	0–1	Al Taawoun	Riyadh
18:30		Report	Al-Ahmed (yellow card) 34', (goal) 71'; Al-Mufarrij (yellow card) 90+4'; El Mahdioui (yellow card) 90+5'	Stadium: Al-Awwal Park; Attendance: 14,519; Referee: Rade Obrenovič (Slovenia)

=== Super Cup ===
14 August 2024 Semi-finals	Al Taawoun	0–2	Al-Nassr	Abha, Saudi Arabia
19:15 UTC+3	Al-Jumayah (yellow card) 3'; Al-Ahmed (yellow card) 29'; João Pedro (yellow card) 45+2'	Report	Yahya 8'; Lajami (yellow card) 26'; Ronaldo 57'; Brozović (red card) 90+1'	Stadium: Prince Sultan bin Abdulaziz Sports City; Attendance: 7,213; Referee: Davide Massa (Italy)

17 August 2024 Final	Al-Nassr	1–4	Al-Hilal	Abha, Saudi Arabia
19:15 UTC+3	Otávio (yellow card) 34'; Ronaldo 44'; Al-Ghannam (yellow card) 87'	Report	Al-Tombakti (yellow card) 12'; Malcom (yellow card) 28', (goal) 72'; Milinković-Savić 55'; Mitrović 63', 69'; S. Al-Dawsari (yellow card) 77'	Stadium: Prince Sultan bin Abdulaziz Sports City; Attendance: 14,357; Referee: Artur Soares Dias (Portugal)

=== AFC Champions League Elite ===
==== League stage ====
Pos	Team	Pld	W	D	L	GF	GA	GD	Pts	Qualification
1	(Saudi Arabia) Al-Hilal	8	7	1	0	26	7	+19	22	Advance to round of 16
2	(Saudi Arabia) Al-Ahli	8	7	1	0	21	8	+13	22	Advance to round of 16
3	(Saudi Arabia) Al-Nassr	8	5	2	1	17	6	+11	17	Advance to round of 16
4	(Qatar) Al-Sadd	8	3	3	2	10	9	+1	12	Advance to round of 16
5	(United Arab Emirates) Al Wasl	8	3	2	3	8	12	−4	11	Advance to round of 16
6	(Iran) Esteghlal	8	2	3	3	8	9	−1	9	Advance to round of 16
7	(Qatar) Al-Rayyan	8	2	2	4	8	12	−4	8	Advance to round of 16
8	(Uzbekistan) Pakhtakor	8	1	4	3	4	6	−2	7	Advance to round of 16
9	(Iran) Persepolis	8	1	4	3	6	10	−4	7	
10	(Qatar) Al-Gharafa	8	2	1	5	10	18	−8	7	
11	(Iraq) Al-Shorta	8	1	3	4	7	17	−10	6	
12	(United Arab Emirates) Al Ain	8	0	2	6	11	22	−11	2	

Source: Asian Football Confederation
Rules for classification: 1) points; 2) goal difference; 3) number of goals scored; 4) number of matches won; 5) penalty shoot-out if only two teams remain tied and played each other on the final matchday 6) fair play ranking; 7) drawing of lots

16 September 2024 1	Al-Shorta (Iraq)	1–1	(Saudi Arabia) Al-Nassr	Baghdad, Iraq
19:00 UTC+3	Dawood 24'; Esquedinha (yellow card) 80'	Report	Al-Ghannam 14'; Simakan (yellow card) 40'; Al-Najdi (yellow card) 45+3'	Stadium: Al-Madina International Stadium; Attendance: 29,270; Referee: Ahmed Al-Ali (Kuwait)

30 September 2024 2	Al-Nassr (Saudi Arabia)	2–1	(Qatar) Al-Rayyan	Riyadh, Saudi Arabia
21:00 UTC+3	Al-Najdi (yellow card) 21'; Mané 45+1'; Ronaldo 76'; Boushal (yellow card) 90+3'; Otávio (yellow card) 90+6'	Report	Guedes 87'; De Sart (yellow card) 90'	Stadium: Al-Awwal Park; Attendance: 14,547; Referee: Shaun Evans (Australia)

22 October 2024 3	Esteghlal (Iran)	0–1	(Saudi Arabia) Al-Nassr	Dubai, United Arab Emirates
20:00 UTC+4	Masharipov (yellow card) 49'	Report	Laporte 81'	Stadium: Rashid Stadium; Attendance: 7,600; Referee: Adham Makhadmeh (Jordan)
Note: Match moved to Dubai due to security concerns in Iran.

5 November 2024 4	Al-Nassr (Saudi Arabia)	5–1	(United Arab Emirates) Al-Ain	Riyadh, Saudi Arabia
21:00 UTC+3	Talisca 5', 90+4'; Ronaldo 31'; Cardoso 37' (o.g.); Brozović (yellow card) 43'; Wesley 81'	Report	Kaku (yellow card) 29'; Bento 56' (o.g.); Traoré (yellow card) 67'	Stadium: Al-Awwal Park; Attendance: 23,324; Referee: Ma Ning (China)

25 November 2024 5	Al-Gharafa (Qatar)	1–3	(Saudi Arabia) Al-Nassr	Al Khor, Qatar
19:00 UTC+3	Sano (yellow card) 61' (yellow-red card) 84'; Joselu 75'	Report	Ronaldo 46', 64'; Ângelo 58'	Stadium: Al Bayt Stadium; Attendance: 37,293; Referee: Shaun Evans (Australia)

2 December 2024 6	Al-Nassr (Saudi Arabia)	1–2	(Qatar) Al-Sadd	Riyadh, Saudi Arabia
21:00 UTC+3	Saïss 80' (o.g.); Al-Fatil (yellow card) 90+6'	Report	Afif 53'; Otávio (yellow card) 89'; Camara (yellow card) 90+3'; Ounas 90+9' (pen.)	Stadium: Al-Awwal Park; Attendance: 13,091; Referee: Yusuke Araki (Japan)

3 February 2025 7	Al-Nassr (Saudi Arabia)	4–0	(United Arab Emirates) Al-Wasl	Riyadh, Saudi Arabia
21:00 UTC+3	Lajami (yellow card) 14'; Al-Hassan 25'; Ronaldo 44' (pen.), 78'; Al-Fatil 88'	Report	Lima (yellow card) 7'; Giménez (yellow card) 40'	Stadium: Al-Awwal Park; Attendance: 20,384; Referee: Ahmed Al-Kaf (Oman)

17 February 2025 8	Persepolis (Iran)	0–0	(Saudi Arabia) Al-Nassr	Tehran, Iran
19:30 UTC+3:30	Kanaani (yellow card) 45+2'; Dursun (yellow card) 48'; Mehri (yellow card) 72'	Report	Al-Sulaiheem (yellow card) 90+4'; Simakan (yellow card) 90+10'	Stadium: Azadi Stadium; Attendance: 70,350; Referee: Rustam Lutfullin (Uzbekistan)

==== Knockout stage ====
===== Round of 16 =====
3 March 2025 Round of 16; First leg	Esteghlal (Iran)	0–0	(Saudi Arabia) Al-Nassr	Tehran, Iran
19:30 UTC+3:30		Report		Stadium: Azadi Stadium; Attendance: 75,130; Referee: Ahmed Al-Kaf (Oman)

10 March 2025 Round of 16; Second leg	Al-Nassr (Saudi Arabia)	3–0 (3–0 agg.)	(Iran) Esteghlal	Riyadh, Saudi Arabia
21:00 UTC+3	Durán 9', 84'; Ronaldo 27' (pen.); Al-Najdi (yellow card) 68'	Report	Ahmadi (yellow card) 17' (yellow-red card) 45+2'; Kojo (yellow card) 62'	Stadium: Al-Awwal Park; Attendance: 23,256; Referee: Ilgiz Tantashev (Uzbekistan)

===== Finals =====
26 April 2025 Quarter-finals	Yokohama F. Marinos (Japan)	1–4	(Saudi Arabia) Al-Nassr	Jeddah, Saudi Arabia
22:30 UTC+3	Matsubara (yellow card) 15'; Watanabe 53', (yellow card) 58' (yellow-red card) 73'; Yamane (yellow card) 57'	Report	Durán 27', 49'; Mané 31'; Ronaldo 38'	Stadium: Prince Abdullah Al-Faisal Sports City; Attendance: 12,003; Referee: Adel Al-Naqbi (United Arab Emirates)

30 April 2025 Semi-finals	Al-Nassr (Saudi Arabia)	2–3	(Japan) Kawasaki Frontale	Jeddah, Saudi Arabia
19:30 UTC+3	Mané 28'; Lajami (yellow card) 37'; Yahya 87'	Report	Itō 10'; Ozeki 41'; Ienaga 76'; Erison (yellow card) 90+14'	Stadium: King Abdullah Sports City; Attendance: 28,810; Referee: Alireza Faghani (Australia)

== Statistics ==
=== Appearances ===
Last updated on 26 May 2025.

No.	Pos	Nat	Player	Total		Pro League		King's Cup		ACL Elite		Super Cup	
No.	Pos	Nat	Player	Apps	Goals	Apps	Goals	Apps	Goals	Apps	Goals	Apps	Goals
Goalkeepers
22	GK	(Saudi Arabia) KSA	Ahmed Al-Rehaili	0	0	0	0	0	0	0	0	0	0
24	GK	(Brazil) BRA	Bento	49	0	34	0	2	0	11	0	2	0
36	GK	(Saudi Arabia) KSA	Raghed Al-Najjar	1	0	0	0	0	0	1	0	0	0
61	GK	(Saudi Arabia) KSA	Mubarak Al-Buainain	0	0	0	0	0	0	0	0	0	0
Defenders
2	DF	(Saudi Arabia) KSA	Sultan Al-Ghannam	40	3	27	2	1+1	0	8+1	1	2	0
3	DF	(France) FRA	Mohamed Simakan	39	1	26	1	1+1	0	11	0	0	0
4	DF	(Saudi Arabia) KSA	Mohammed Al-Fatil	26	2	9+8	1	1	0	5+3	1	0	0
12	DF	(Saudi Arabia) KSA	Nawaf Boushal	44	3	24+6	2	2	1	9+3	0	0	0
27	DF	(Spain) ESP	Aymeric Laporte	30	5	18+2	4	2	0	3+3	1	2	0
50	DF	(Saudi Arabia) KSA	Majed Qasheesh	11	0	4+5	0	0	0	1+1	0	0	0
70	DF	(Saudi Arabia) KSA	Awad Aman	1	0	0+1	0	0	0	0	0	0	0
78	DF	(Saudi Arabia) KSA	Ali Lajami	35	0	15+10	0	0	0	5+3	0	2	0
83	DF	(Saudi Arabia) KSA	Salem Al-Najdi	37	1	10+15	1	1+1	0	6+4	0	0	0
Midfielders
8	MF	(Saudi Arabia) KSA	Abdulmajeed Al-Sulayhem	16	0	5+8	0	0	0	1+2	0	0	0
11	MF	(Croatia) CRO	Marcelo Brozović	41	2	26+2	2	1	0	11	0	1	0
14	MF	(Saudi Arabia) KSA	Sami Al-Najei	2	0	0+1	0	0	0	0	0	0+1	0
17	MF	(Saudi Arabia) KSA	Abdullah Al-Khaibari	32	0	15+7	0	0+1	0	4+3	0	2	0
19	MF	(Saudi Arabia) KSA	Ali Al-Hassan	31	3	13+9	2	1	0	5+3	1	0	0
23	MF	(Saudi Arabia) KSA	Ayman Yahya	30	7	12+10	5	0	0	3+3	1	2	1
25	MF	(Portugal) POR	Otávio	40	1	26+2	1	1+1	0	7+1	0	2	0
29	MF	(Saudi Arabia) KSA	Abdulrahman Ghareeb	29	0	7+11	0	1+1	0	3+4	0	0+2	0
40	MF	(Egypt) EGY	Yousef El Tahan	0	0	0	0	0	0	0	0	0	0
54	MF	(Saudi Arabia) KSA	Faris Salem	0	0	0	0	0	0	0	0	0	0
58	MF	(Saudi Arabia) KSA	Mohammed Hazazi	1	0	0	0	0	0	0+1	0	0	0
80	MF	(Brazil) BRA	Wesley	22	1	3+7	0	1+1	0	0+10	1	0	0
88	MF	(Saudi Arabia) KSA	Bassam Hazazi	0	0	0	0	0	0	0	0	0	0
Forwards
7	FW	(Portugal) POR	Cristiano Ronaldo	41	35	30	25	1	0	8	8	2	2
9	FW	(Colombia) COL	Jhon Durán	18	12	12+1	8	0	0	5	4	0	0
10	FW	(Senegal) SEN	Sadio Mané	47	18	32	14	1+1	1	11	3	2	0
16	FW	(Saudi Arabia) KSA	Mohammed Maran	15	1	0+10	1	0+2	0	1+1	0	0+1	0
20	FW	(Brazil) BRA	Ângelo Gabriel	38	2	15+10	1	2	0	8+3	1	0	0
60	FW	(Saudi Arabia) KSA	Saad Haqawi	5	0	0+5	0	0	0	0	0	0	0
Players sent out on loan this season
1	GK	(Saudi Arabia) KSA	Amin Bukhari	0	0	0	0	0	0	0	0	0	0
44	GK	(Saudi Arabia) KSA	Nawaf Al-Aqidi	0	0	0	0	0	0	0	0	0	0
Player who made an appearance this season but have left the club
6	MF	(Saudi Arabia) KSA	Mukhtar Ali	11	0	0+5	0	1	0	1+2	0	0+2	0
13	DF	(Brazil) BRA	Alex Telles	4	0	2	0	0	0	0	0	2	0
94	MF	(Brazil) BRA	Talisca	19	8	9+1	6	2	0	4+1	2	1+1	0

=== Goalscorers ===
Rank	No.	Pos.	Nat.	Player	Pro League	King's Cup	ACL Elite	Super Cup	Total
1	7	FW	(Portugal)	Cristiano Ronaldo	25	0	8	2	35
2	10	FW	(Senegal)	Sadio Mané	14	1	3	0	18
3	9	FW	(Colombia)	Jhon Durán	8	0	4	0	12
4	94	MF	(Brazil)	Talisca	6	0	2	0	8
5	23	MF	(Saudi Arabia)	Ayman Yahya	5	0	1	1	7
6	27	DF	(Spain)	Aymeric Laporte	4	0	1	0	5
7	2	DF	(Saudi Arabia)	Sultan Al-Ghannam	2	0	1	0	3
7	12	DF	(Saudi Arabia)	Nawaf Boushal	2	1	0	0	3
7	19	MF	(Saudi Arabia)	Ali Al-Hassan	2	0	1	0	3
10	4	DF	(Saudi Arabia)	Mohammed Al-Fatil	1	0	1	0	2
10	11	MF	(Croatia)	Marcelo Brozović	2	0	0	0	2
10	20	FW	(Brazil)	Ângelo Gabriel	1	0	1	0	2
13	3	DF	(France)	Mohamed Simakan	1	0	0	0	1
13	16	FW	(Saudi Arabia)	Mohammed Maran	1	0	0	0	1
13	25	MF	(Portugal)	Otávio	1	0	0	0	1
13	80	MF	(Brazil)	Wesley	0	0	1	0	1
13	83	DF	(Saudi Arabia)	Salem Al-Najdi	1	0	0	0	1
Own goal					2	0	2	0	4
Total					78	2	26	3	109

Last Updated: 26 May 2025

=== Assists ===
Rank	No.	Pos.	Nat.	Player	Pro League	King's Cup	ACL Elite	Super Cup	Total
1	10	FW	(Senegal)	Sadio Mané	11	0	1	0	12
2	20	FW	(Brazil)	Ângelo Gabriel	6	0	3	0	9
3	25	MF	(Portugal)	Otávio	5	0	3	0	8
4	12	DF	(Saudi Arabia)	Nawaf Boushal	6	0	1	0	7
5	11	MF	(Croatia)	Marcelo Brozović	5	0	1	0	6
6	2	DF	(Saudi Arabia)	Sultan Al-Ghannam	1	1	2	1	5
7	7	FW	(Portugal)	Cristiano Ronaldo	3	0	0	1	4
8	3	DF	(France)	Mohamed Simakan	1	0	2	0	3
8	23	MF	(Saudi Arabia)	Ayman Yahya	3	0	0	0	3
8	29	MF	(Saudi Arabia)	Abdulrahman Ghareeb	1	0	1	1	3
11	80	MF	(Brazil)	Wesley	0	0	2	0	2
12	4	DF	(Saudi Arabia)	Mohammed Al-Fatil	1	0	0	0	1
12	8	MF	(Saudi Arabia)	Abdulmajeed Al-Sulayhem	1	0	0	0	1
12	60	FW	(Saudi Arabia)	Saad Haqawi	1	0	0	0	1
12	78	DF	(Saudi Arabia)	Ali Lajami	1	0	0	0	1
12	83	DF	(Saudi Arabia)	Salem Al-Najdi	1	0	0	0	1
Total					47	1	16	3	67

Last Updated: 26 May 2025

=== Clean sheets ===
Rank	No.	Pos.	Nat.	Player	Pro League	King's Cup	ACL Elite	Super Cup	Total
1	24	GK	(Brazil)	Bento	9	0	4	1	14
2	36	GK	(Saudi Arabia)	Raghed Al-Najjar	0	0	1	0	1
Total					9	0	5	1	15

Last Updated: 21 May 2025
