= 2024 Saudi Super Cup final =

2024 Diriyah Saudi Super Cup Final
- Event: 2024 Saudi Super Cup
Al-Nassr	Al-Hilal
1	4
- Date: 17 August 2024
- Venue: Prince Sultan bin Abdulaziz Sports City, Abha
- Referee: Artur Soares Dias (Portugal)
- Attendance: 14,357
- Weather: Cloudy; 21 °C (70 °F); 75% humidity

The 2024 Saudi Super Cup final (also known as The Diriyah Saudi Super Cup final for sponsorship reasons) was the 11th edition of the Saudi Super Cup. The final was played on 17 August 2024 at the Prince Sultan bin Abdulaziz Sports City, Abha, between Al-Nassr and Al-Hilal.

Al-Hilal defeated Al-Nassr 4–1 to win their record-extending fifth title.

== Teams ==
Team	Qualification for tournament	Previous finals appearances (bold indicates winners)
Al-Hilal	2023–24 Pro League and 2023–24 King Cup winners	6 (**2015**, 2016, **2018**, 2020, **2021**, **2023**)
Al-Nassr	2023–24 Pro League and 2023–24 King Cup runners-up	4 (2014, 2015, **2019**, **2020**)

== Venue ==
The Prince Sultan bin Abdulaziz Sports City was announced as the venue of the final on 4 July 2024. This was the first time the tournament was hosted in Abha.

The Prince Sultan bin Abdulaziz Sports City was built and opened in 1984. The stadium was used as a venue for the 2022 Arab Cup U-20 and the 2023 Arab Club Champions Cup, and the 2019 AFC Asian Cup. It is used by Abha and Damac as a home stadium.

== Background ==
As part of the running sponsorship deal between the Saudi Arabian Football Federation (SAFF) and the Diriyah company, the match was officially referred to as "The Diriyah Saudi Super Cup".

This will be Al-Nassr's fifth appearance in the final. Al-Nassr lost the 2014 and 2015 finals to Al-Shabab and Al-Hilal respectively and won the 2019 and 2020 finals against Al-Taawoun and Al-Hilal. Al-Nassr qualified by defeating Al-Taawoun 2–0 in the semi-finals.

Al-Hilal will be making their seventh finals appearance, the most by any club. They won the title four times, in 2015, 2018, 2021, and 2023. Al-Hilal qualified after defeating Al-Ahli in a penalty shoot-out after a 1–1 draw in the semi-finals.

This will be the fourth meeting between these two sides in the Saudi Super Cup and the sixteenth meeting in a cup final. Al-Hilal previously defeated Al-Nassr 1–0 in the 2015 final and 2–1 in the 2023 semi-final. Al-Nassr defeated Al-Hilal 3–0 in the 2020 final. In the fifteen previous cup final meetings, Al-Nassr won eight times, while Al-Hilal won seven times. This will be the 185th competitive meeting between the two sides in all competitions. In the clubs' 184 previous meetings, Al-Hilal won 72, Al-Nassr won 59 and the remaining 53 were drawn.

== Match ==
=== Details ===
17 August 2024
19:15 AST

Al-Nassr	1–4	Al-Hilal
Ronaldo 44'	Report	Milinković-Savić 55'; Mitrović 63', 69'; Malcom 72'

Prince Sultan bin Abdulaziz Sports City, Abha
Attendance: 14,357
Referee: Artur Soares Dias (Portugal)

**Al-Nassr**	**Al-Hilal**

GK	24	(Brazil) Bento
RB	2	(Saudi Arabia) Sultan Al-Ghannam	(yellow card) 87'
CB	78	(Saudi Arabia) Ali Lajami
CB	27	(Spain) Aymeric Laporte
LB	13	(Brazil) Alex Telles
DM	17	(Saudi Arabia) Abdullah Al-Khaibari		(substituted off) 75'
DM	25	(Portugal) Otávio	(yellow card) 34'
RW	23	(Saudi Arabia) Ayman Yahya		(substituted off) 26'
AM	94	(Brazil) Talisca		(substituted off) 75'
LW	10	(Senegal) Sadio Mané
CF	7	(Portugal) Cristiano Ronaldo
Substitutes:
GK	36	(Saudi Arabia) Raghed Al-Najjar
DF	4	(Saudi Arabia) Mohammed Al-Fatil
DF	12	(Saudi Arabia) Nawaf Boushal
MF	6	(Saudi Arabia) Mukhtar Ali		(substituted on) 75'
MF	8	(Saudi Arabia) Abdulmajeed Al-Sulayhem
MF	14	(Saudi Arabia) Sami Al-Najei		(substituted on) 75'
MF	29	(Saudi Arabia) Abdulrahman Ghareeb		(substituted on) 26'
FW	16	(Saudi Arabia) Mohammed Maran
FW	30	(Saudi Arabia) Meshari Al-Nemer
Manager:
(Portugal) Luís Castro

GK	37	(Morocco) Yassine Bounou
RB	66	(Saudi Arabia) Saud Abdulhamid
CB	87	(Saudi Arabia) Hassan Al-Tombakti	(yellow card) 12'
CB	3	(Senegal) Kalidou Koulibaly
LB	6	(Brazil) Renan Lodi		(substituted off) 80'
DM	22	(Serbia) Sergej Milinković-Savić
DM	8	(Portugal) Rúben Neves
RW	96	(Brazil) Michael		(substituted off) 90+3'
AM	77	(Brazil) Malcom	(yellow card) 28'	(substituted off) 79'
LW	29	(Saudi Arabia) Salem Al-Dawsari	(yellow card) 77'	(substituted off) 90+4'
CF	9	(Serbia) Aleksandar Mitrović
Substitutes:
GK	21	(Saudi Arabia) Mohammed Al-Owais
DF	4	(Saudi Arabia) Khalifah Al-Dawsari
DF	12	(Saudi Arabia) Yasser Al-Shahrani		(substituted on) 80'
DF	16	(Saudi Arabia) Nasser Al-Dawsari		(substituted on) 90+4'
DF	88	(Saudi Arabia) Hamad Al-Yami
MF	15	(Saudi Arabia) Mohammed Al-Qahtani		(substituted on) 90+3'
MF	18	(Saudi Arabia) Musab Al-Juwayr
MF	28	(Saudi Arabia) Mohamed Kanno		(substituted on) 79'
FW	99	(Saudi Arabia) Abdullah Al-Hamdan
Manager:
(Portugal) Jorge Jesus

Man of the Match:

Assistant referees:
Pedro Ribeiro (Portugal)
Pedro Martins (Portugal)
Fourth official:
Abdullah Al-Shehri
Video assistant referee:
Tiago Martins (Portugal)
Assistant video assistant referees:
Hélder Malheiro (Portugal)

**Match rules**

- 90 minutes
- Penalty shoot-out if scores still level
- Nine named substitutes
- Maximum of five substitutions

=== Statistics ===
First half
Statistic	Al-Nassr	Al-Hilal
Goals scored	1	0
Total shots	4	1
Shots on target	1	0
Saves	0	0
Ball possession	48%	52%
Corner kicks	2	3
Offsides	1	1
Yellow cards	1	2
Red cards	0	0

Second half
Statistic	Al-Nassr	Al-Hilal
Goals scored	0	4
Total shots	1	8
Shots on target	0	5
Saves	1	0
Ball possession	42%	58%
Corner kicks	2	5
Offsides	1	0
Yellow cards	1	1
Red cards	0	0

Overall
Statistic	Al-Nassr	Al-Hilal
Goals scored	1	4
Total shots	5	9
Shots on target	1	5
Saves	1	0
Ball possession	44%	56%
Corner kicks	4	8
Fouls committed	10	10
Offsides	2	1
Yellow cards	2	3
Red cards	0	0

== See also ==
- 2023–24 Saudi Pro League
- 2023–24 King Cup
