= 2022–23 Al-Nassr FC season =

Al-Nassr
2022–23 season
- President: Musalli Al-Muammar
- Head coach: Rudi Garcia (until 13 April); Dinko Jeličić (interim, from 13 April)
- Stadium: Al-Awwal Park
- Pro League: 2nd
- King's Cup: Semi-finals (knocked out by Al-Wehda)
- Super Cup: Semi-finals (knocked out by Al-Ittihad)
- Top goalscorer: League: Talisca (20); All: Talisca (21)
- Highest home attendance: 23,248 (vs. Al-Hilal, 26 December 2022)
- Lowest home attendance: 11,721 (vs. Al-Tai, 6 January 2023)
- Average home league attendance: 17,638
Home colours	Away colours	Third colours

The 2022–23 season was Al-Nassr's 47th consecutive season in the top flight of Saudi football and 67th year in existence as a football club. The club participated in the Pro League, the King's Cup, and the Super Cup.

The season covers the period from 1 July 2022 to 30 June 2023.

This season, the club brought in Cristiano Ronaldo, considered one of the greatest footballers of all time. He signed a contract for two-and-a-half years until 2025, with a total salary of €200 million per year, thought to be the highest salary ever paid to a professional footballer. He made an immediate impact on the global following of the club, with their Instagram account growing from 860,000 followers before his move to over 10 million followers less than a week later.

== Players ==
=== Squad information ===
As of 3 February 2023

Note: Flags indicate national team as defined under FIFA eligibility rules; some limited exceptions apply. Players may hold more than one non-FIFA nationality.

No.	Pos.	Nation	Player
1	GK	KSA	Amin Bukhari
2	DF	KSA	Sultan Al-Ghannam
3	DF	KSA	Abdullah Madu
4	DF	KSA	Mohammed Al-Fatil
5	DF	KSA	Abdulelah Al-Amri
7	FW	POR	Cristiano Ronaldo (captain)
8	MF	KSA	Abdulmajeed Al-Sulayhem
10	MF	ARG	Pity Martínez
12	DF	KSA	Nawaf Boushal
13	DF	CIV	Ghislain Konan
14	MF	KSA	Sami Al-Najei
16	FW	KSA	Mohammed Maran
17	MF	KSA	Abdullah Al-Khaibari
18	MF	BRA	Luiz Gustavo
19	MF	KSA	Ali Al-Hassan

No.	Pos.	Nation	Player
20	DF	KSA	Hamad Al Mansour
21	DF	ESP	Álvaro González
22	GK	ARG	Agustín Rossi (on loan from Boca Juniors)
23	MF	KSA	Ayman Yahya
27	DF	KSA	Majed Qasheesh
29	MF	KSA	Abdulrahman Ghareeb
30	FW	KSA	Meshari Al-Nemer
33	GK	KSA	Waleed Abdullah
44	GK	KSA	Nawaf Al-Aqidi
46	MF	KSA	Abdulaziz Al-Elewai
55	DF	KSA	Abdulaziz Al-Faraj
59	DF	KSA	Yousef Haqawi
77	MF	UZB	Jaloliddin Masharipov
78	DF	KSA	Ali Lajami
94	MF	BRA	Talisca

=== Unregistered players ===
Note: Flags indicate national team as defined under FIFA eligibility rules; some limited exceptions apply. Players may hold more than one non-FIFA nationality.

No.	Pos.	Nation	Player
25	GK	COL	David Ospina
—	DF	KSA	Mohammed Qassem
—	MF	KSA	Mohammed Sahlouli

No.	Pos.	Nation	Player
—	MF	KSA	Khalid Haqawi
—	FW	KSA	Fahad Al-Zubaidi
—	FW	KSA	Muhannad Barah

=== Out on loan ===
Note: Flags indicate national team as defined under FIFA eligibility rules; some limited exceptions apply. Players may hold more than one non-FIFA nationality.

No.	Pos.	Nation	Player
11	MF	KSA	Khalid Al-Ghannam (at Al-Fateh until 30 June 2023)
24	DF	KSA	Mansour Al-Shammari (at Al-Ahli until 30 June 2023)
28	DF	KOR	Kim Jin-su (at Jeonbuk Hyundai Motors until 30 June 2023)
52	MF	KSA	Khalil Al-Absi (at Al-Tai until 30 June 2023)
53	MF	KSA	Sultan Al-Anazi (at Al-Qaisumah until 30 June 2023)
54	MF	KSA	Basil Al-Sayyali (at Al-Hazem until 30 June 2023)
57	GK	KSA	Raed Azybi (at Al-Faisaly until 30 June 2023)

No.	Pos.	Nation	Player
58	DF	KSA	Aser Hawsawi (at Al-Okhdood until 30 June 2023)
86	DF	KSA	Nawaf Al-Mutairi (at Al-Orobah until 30 June 2023)
—	GK	KSA	Abdulrahman Al-Shammari (at Najran until 30 June 2023)
—	MF	KSA	Mukhtar Ali (at Al-Tai until 30 June 2023)
—	MF	KSA	Nawaf Al-Osaimi (at Al-Arabi until 30 June 2023)
—	FW	KSA	Abdulfattah Adam (at Abha until 30 June 2023)

== Transfers and loans ==
=== Transfers in ===
Entry date	Position	No.	Player	From club	Fee	Ref.
30 June 2022	GK	41	(Saudi Arabia) Waleed Al-Enezi	(Saudi Arabia) Al-Fateh	End of loan	
30 June 2022	GK	44	(Saudi Arabia) Nawaf Al-Aqidi	(Saudi Arabia) Al-Tai	End of loan	
30 June 2022	GK	–	(Saudi Arabia) Abdulrahman Al-Shammari	(Saudi Arabia) Najran	End of loan	
30 June 2022	DF	27	(Saudi Arabia) Osama Al-Khalaf	(Saudi Arabia) Al-Hazem	End of loan	
30 June 2022	DF	34	(Saudi Arabia) Abdulmajeed Abbas	(Saudi Arabia) Al-Shoulla	End of loan	
30 June 2022	DF	35	(Saudi Arabia) Khalid Al-Shuwayyi	(Saudi Arabia) Al-Jabalain	End of loan	
30 June 2022	DF	50	(Saudi Arabia) Abdulaziz Al-Elewai	(Saudi Arabia) Al-Batin	End of loan	
30 June 2022	DF	55	(Saudi Arabia) Abdullah Al-Shanqiti	(Saudi Arabia) Al-Raed	End of loan	
30 June 2022	DF	86	(Saudi Arabia) Nawaf Al-Mutairi	(Saudi Arabia) Najran	End of loan	
30 June 2022	DF	–	(Saudi Arabia) Osama Al-Bawardi	(Saudi Arabia) Al-Sahel	End of loan	
30 June 2022	DF	–	(Saudi Arabia) Mohammed Daghriri	(Saudi Arabia) Al-Okhdood	End of loan	
30 June 2022	MF	21	(Saudi Arabia) Mukhtar Ali	(Saudi Arabia) Al-Tai	End of loan	
30 June 2022	MF	23	(Saudi Arabia) Ayman Yahya	(Saudi Arabia) Al-Ahli	End of loan	
30 June 2022	MF	46	(Saudi Arabia) Khalid Al-Ghwinem	(Saudi Arabia) Al-Shoulla	End of loan	
30 June 2022	MF	98	(Saudi Arabia) Abdulrahman Al-Shanar	(Saudi Arabia) Al-Jeel	End of loan	
30 June 2022	FW	16	(Saudi Arabia) Mohammed Maran	(Saudi Arabia) Al-Tai	End of loan	
30 June 2022	FW	52	(Saudi Arabia) Khalil Al-Absi	(Saudi Arabia) Al-Kholood	End of loan	
7 July 2022	DF	13	(Ivory Coast) Ghislain Konan	(France) Reims	Free	
11 July 2022	GK	25	(Colombia) David Ospina	(Italy) Napoli	Free	
24 July 2022	MF	18	(Brazil) Luiz Gustavo	(Turkey) Fenerbahçe	Free	
20 August 2022	MF	29	(Saudi Arabia) Abdulrahman Ghareeb	(Saudi Arabia) Al-Ahli	$6,650,000	
29 August 2022	DF	21	(Spain) Álvaro González	(France) Marseille	Free	
1 January 2023 (Note: The transfer was announced on 30 December 2022, and would become official on 1 January 2023 once the transfer window opened.)	FW	7	(Portugal) Cristiano Ronaldo	Unattached (Note: Most recently played for Manchester United)	Free	
20 January 2023	DF	12	(Saudi Arabia) Nawaf Boushal	(Saudi Arabia) Al-Fateh	$4,260,000	

=== Loans in ===
Start date	End date	Position	No.	Player	From club	Fee	Ref.
24 January 2023	End of season	GK	22	(Argentina) Agustín Rossi	(Argentina) Boca Juniors	$1,300,000	

=== Transfers out ===
Exit date	Position	No.	Player	To club	Fee	Ref.
30 June 2022	MF	87	(Brazil) Anselmo	(Saudi Arabia) Al-Wehda	End of loan	
1 July 2022	FW	22	(Uruguay) Jonathan Rodríguez	(Mexico) América	$5,566,000	
7 July 2022	DF	35	(Saudi Arabia) Khalid Al-Shuwayyi	(Saudi Arabia) Al-Riyadh	Free	
16 July 2022	DF	–	(Saudi Arabia) Osama Al-Bawardi	(Saudi Arabia) Ohod	Free	
16 July 2022	MF	–	(Saudi Arabia) Faraj Al-Ghashayan	(Saudi Arabia) Al-Qadsiah	Free	
20 July 2022	DF	27	(Saudi Arabia) Osama Al-Khalaf	(Saudi Arabia) Al-Fayha	$266,000	
20 July 2022	DF	30	(Saudi Arabia) Abdulkareem Al-Muziel	(Saudi Arabia) Al-Batin	Free	
20 July 2022	DF	31	(Saudi Arabia) Dhari Al-Anazi	(Saudi Arabia) Damac	Undisclosed	
21 July 2022	DF	–	(Saudi Arabia) Mohammed Daghriri	(Saudi Arabia) Najran	Free	
22 July 2022	MF	46	(Saudi Arabia) Khalid Al-Ghwinem	(Saudi Arabia) Ohod	Free	
27 July 2022	DF	55	(Saudi Arabia) Abdullah Al-Shanqiti	(Saudi Arabia) Al-Khaleej	Undisclosed	
4 August 2022	DF	55	(Argentina) Ramiro Funes Mori	(Mexico) Cruz Azul	$1,535,000	
12 August 2022	GK	41	(Saudi Arabia) Waleed Al-Enezi	(Saudi Arabia) Al-Fateh	Free	
1 September 2022	DF	34	(Saudi Arabia) Abdulmajeed Abbas	(Saudi Arabia) Al-Shaeib	Free	
1 September 2022	MF	98	(Saudi Arabia) Abdulrahman Al-Shanar	(Saudi Arabia) Al-Shaeib	Free	
1 September 2022	MF	–	(Yemen) Ali Yahya	(Saudi Arabia) Al-Shaeib	Free	
9 September 2022	MF	–	(Saudi Arabia) Fawaz Al-Mutairi	(Saudi Arabia) Al-Diriyah	Free	
12 September 2022	FW	–	(Saudi Arabia) Eissa Al-Rashed	(Saudi Arabia) Al-Rayyan	Free	
19 September 2022	DF	–	(Saudi Arabia) Musab Al-Sanei	(Saudi Arabia) Al-Bukiryah	Free	
21 September 2022	MF	28	(Saudi Arabia) Ibrahim Al-Mahdawi	(Saudi Arabia) Qilwah	Free	
17 January 2023	DF	50	(Saudi Arabia) Abdulaziz Al-Alawi	(Saudi Arabia) Al-Adalah	Free	
21 January 2023	FW	9	(Cameroon) Vincent Aboubakar	(Turkey) Beşiktaş	Free	
27 April 2023	MF	45	(Saudi Arabia) Abdulfattah Asiri	(Finland) IFK Mariehamn	Free	

=== Loans out ===
Start date	End date	Position	No.	Player	To club	Fee	Ref.
18 July 2022	31 August 2022	GK	–	(Saudi Arabia) Abdulrahman Al-Shammari	(Saudi Arabia) Al-Qadsiah	None	
27 July 2022	End of season	FW	52	(Saudi Arabia) Khalil Al-Absi	(Saudi Arabia) Al-Tai	None	
18 August 2022	End of season	FW	29	(Saudi Arabia) Abdulfattah Adam	(Saudi Arabia) Abha	$266,000	
27 August 2022	End of season	MF	54	(Saudi Arabia) Basil Al-Sayyali	(Saudi Arabia) Al-Hazem	None	
29 August 2022	End of season	DF	86	(Saudi Arabia) Nawaf Al-Mutairi	(Saudi Arabia) Al-Orobah	None	
29 August 2022	End of season	MF	21	(Saudi Arabia) Mukhtar Ali	(Saudi Arabia) Al-Tai	None	
31 August 2022	End of season	GK	–	(Saudi Arabia) Abdulrahman Al-Shammari	(Saudi Arabia) Najran	None	
6 September 2022	End of season	GK	57	(Saudi Arabia) Raed Azybi	(Saudi Arabia) Al-Faisaly	None	
8 September 2022	End of season	MF	–	(Saudi Arabia) Nawaf Al-Osaimi	(Saudi Arabia) Al-Arabi	None	
9 September 2022	End of season	MF	53	(Saudi Arabia) Sultan Al-Anazi	(Saudi Arabia) Al-Qaisumah	None	
2 January 2023	End of season	DF	24	(Saudi Arabia) Mansour Al-Shammari	(Saudi Arabia) Al-Ahli	None	
25 January 2023	End of season	DF	58	(Saudi Arabia) Aser Hawsawi	(Saudi Arabia) Al-Okhdood	None	
28 January 2023	End of season	MF	11	(Saudi Arabia) Khalid Al-Ghannam	(Saudi Arabia) Al-Fateh	None	

== Pre-season and friendlies ==
29 July 2022 Friendly	Al-Nassr (Saudi Arabia)	2–2	(Spain) Las Palmas	Marbella, Spain
19:00 CEST	Al Mansour 75'; Aboubakar 90'	Report	Al-Fatil 57' (o.g.); Mandiang 83'	Stadium: La Quinta Football Center

1 August 2022 Friendly	Al-Nassr (Saudi Arabia)	2–1	(Spain) Real Zaragoza	Marbella, Spain
19:00 CEST	Al-Najei 38', 60'	Report	Vada 86'	Stadium: Marbella Football Center

5 August 2022 Friendly	Al-Nassr (Saudi Arabia)	2–0	(Spain) Málaga	Marbella, Spain
19:00 CEST	Al-Najei 62'; Aboubakar 69'	Report		Stadium: Marbella Football Center

8 August 2022 Friendly	Al-Nassr (Saudi Arabia)	2–1	(Spain) Juventud Torremolinos	Marbella, Spain
19:00 CEST	Aboubakar 42'; Talisca 44'	Report		Stadium: Marbella Football Center

11 August 2022 Friendly	Al-Nassr (Saudi Arabia)	1–0	(Spain) Cádiz B	Marbella, Spain
18:30 CEST	K. Al-Ghannam 48'	Report		Stadium: Marbella Football Center

16 August 2022 Friendly	Al-Nassr (Saudi Arabia)	3–3	(Saudi Arabia) Al-Arabi	Riyadh, Saudi Arabia
20:15 AST	Al-Najei 12', 26'; Aboubakar 51' (pen.)	Report	Manoel; Mbengue; Sharahili	Stadium: Mrsool Park

21 August 2022 Friendly	Al-Nassr (Saudi Arabia)	1–2	(Saudi Arabia) Al-Raed	Riyadh, Saudi Arabia
20:15 AST	Talisca 71'	Report	Đoković 36'; Tavares 42'	Stadium: Mrsool Park

19 January 2023 Riyadh Season Cup	Al-Hilal/Al-Nassr stars (Saudi Arabia)	4–5	(France) Paris Saint-Germain	Riyadh, Saudi Arabia
20:00 SAST (UTC+3)	Ronaldo 34' (pen.), 45+6'; Jang 56'; Al-Bulaihi (yellow card) 59'; Talisca 90+4'	Report	Messi 3'; Navas (yellow card) 33'; Bernat (red card) 39'; Marquinhos 43'; Neymar (penalty missed) 45+3'; Ramos 53'; Mbappé 60' (pen.); Ekitike 78'	Stadium: King Fahd International Stadium; Attendance: 68,000; Referee: Abdulrahman Al-Jassim (Qatar)

== Competitions ==
=== Overview ===
Competition	Record							
Competition	G	W	D	L	GF	GA	GD	Win %
Pro League	30	20	7	3	63	18	+45	66.67
King's Cup	3	2	0	1	5	2	+3	66.67
Super Cup	1	0	0	1	1	3	−2	0.00
Total	34	22	7	5	69	23	+46	64.71

Updated to match played 31 May 2023
Source: Competitions

=== Pro League ===
==== League table ====
Pos	Team	Pld	W	D	L	GF	GA	GD	Pts	Qualification or relegation
1	Al-Ittihad (C, Q)	30	22	6	2	60	13	+47	72	Qualified for the AFC Champions League group stage and the 2023 FIFA Club World Cup
2	Al-Nassr	30	20	7	3	63	18	+45	67	Qualified for the AFC Champions League play-off round
3	Al-Hilal (Note: Al-Hilal qualified for the AFC Champions League group stage as the 2022–23 King Cup winners.)	30	17	8	5	54	29	+25	59	Qualified for the AFC Champions League group stage
4	Al-Shabab	30	17	5	8	57	33	+24	56	
5	Al-Taawoun	30	16	7	7	46	34	+12	55	

Updated to match(es) played on 31 May 2023. Source: SPL
Rules for classification: 1) Points; 2) Head-to-head points; 3) Head-to-head goal difference; 4) Total goal difference; 5) Total goals scored; 6) Fair-play points (Note: Head-to-head record is used only after all the matches between the teams in question have been played).
(C) Champions; (Q) Qualified for the phase indicated

==== Results summary ====
Overall								Home						Away					
Pld	W	D	L	GF	GA	GD	Pts	W	D	L	GF	GA	GD	W	D	L	GF	GA	GD
30	20	7	3	63	18	+45	67	12	3	0	35	10	+25	8	4	3	28	8	+20

Last updated: 31 May 2023.
Source: spl.com.sa

==== Results by round ====
Round	1	2	3	4	5	6	7	8	9	10	11	12	13	14	15	16	17	18	19	20	21	22	23	24	25	26	27	28	29	30
Ground	H	A	H	A	H	A	H	H	A	H	A	H	A	H	A	A	H	A	H	A	H	A	A	A	H	H	A	H	A	H
Result	W	L	W	W	D	W	W	W	W	D	W	W	D	W	D	W	W	W	W	L	W	W	D	W	L	D	W	W	D	W
Position	7	9	6	4	5	4	2	2	1	1	1	1	1	1	1	1	1	1	1	2	2	2	2	2	2	2	2	2	2	2

Updated to match(es) played on 31 May 2023. Source: spl.com.sa
A = Away; H = Home; W = Win; D = Draw; L = Loss

==== Matches ====
All times are local, AST (UTC+3).

Win Draw Loss Postponed

27 August 2022 1	Al-Nassr	1–0	Al-Wehda	Riyadh
21:00	Aboubakar 3'; Al-Hassan (yellow card) 42'	Report	Duarte (yellow card) 45+1'	Stadium: Mrsool Park; Attendance: 19,312; Referee: Mohammed Al-Hoaish

3 September 2022 2	Al-Taawoun	1–0	Al-Nassr	Buraidah
19:00	Al-Oyayari (yellow card) 66'; Balobaid (yellow card) 85'; Tawamba (yellow card) 90+9'; Al-Nabit 90+12'	Report	Al-Amri (yellow card) 27' f (yellow card) 38'; Gustavo (yellow card) 68'; Al-Hassan (yellow card) 83'	Stadium: King Abdullah Sport City Stadium; Attendance: 14,838; Referee: Kevin Ortega (Peru)

10 September 2022 3	Al-Nassr	2–1	Damac	Riyadh
21:00	Al-Najei 37', (yellow card) 45+3'; Talisca 60'	Report	Chafaï (yellow card) 77'; Duarte 82'	Stadium: Mrsool Park; Attendance: 14,972; Referee: Khaled Al-Teris

15 September 2022 4	Al-Batin	0–4	Al-Nassr	Hafar al-Batin
18:40	Awad (yellow card) 28'; Saad (yellow card) 32'; Naji (yellow card) 44'	Report	Gustavo 17', (yellow card) 53'; Talisca 29'; Al-Najei 40'; Ghareeb 51'; Al-Sulaiheem (yellow card) 59'; Konan (yellow card) 90'	Stadium: Al-Batin Club Stadium; Attendance: 4,096; Referee: Roberto Tobar (Chile)

2 October 2022 5	Al-Nassr	0–0	Al-Ittihad	Riyadh
21:00	Talisca (yellow card) 22'; González (yellow card) 30'; Al-Sulaiheem (red card) 59'	Report	Al-Nashri (yellow card) 37'; Al-Aboud (yellow card) 37'; Hamed (red card) 43'; Bamsaud (yellow card) 53'; Hegazi (yellow card) 56'	Stadium: Mrsool Park; Attendance: 23,025; Referee: Andrés Cunha (Uruguay)

7 October 2022 6	Abha	0–3	Al-Nassr	Abha
18:30	Sami (yellow card) 21'; Adam (yellow card) 87'	Report	Gustavo 5', (yellow card) 42'; S. Al-Ghannam 49'; Yahya 90'	Stadium: Prince Sultan bin Abdul Aziz Stadium; Attendance: 13,250; Referee: Fábio Veríssimo (Portugal)

11 October 2022 7	Al-Nassr	4–1	Al-Adalah	Riyadh
20:30	Yahya 22', 26'; Aboubakar 28', (yellow card) 30'; Talisca 78'; Al-Khaibari (yellow card) 90+2'	Report	Gonzáles 87' (pen.); Al-Nattar (yellow card) 90+3'	Stadium: Mrsool Park; Attendance: 11,894; Referee: Khaled Al-Teris

16 October 2022 8	Al-Nassr	4–0	Al-Fayha	Riyadh
17:45	Gustavo 75', 87'; Talisca 81', 84'	Report	Nasser (yellow card) 34'; Ryller (yellow card) 41'; Abousaban (yellow card) 71'	Stadium: Mrsool Park; Attendance: 12,763; Referee: Mohammed Al-Esmaiel

16 December 2022 9	Al-Raed	1–4	Al-Nassr	Buraidah
18:00	Mitriță 28'; Al-Jebreen (yellow card) 31'; Al-Fahad (yellow card) 63'; El Berkaoui (yellow card) 70'	Report	Aboubakar 45+5'; Talisca 61', 73' (pen.), 89'	Stadium: King Abdullah Sport City Stadium; Attendance: 11,134; Referee: Sami Al-Jires

26 December 2022 10	Al-Nassr	2–2	Al-Hilal	Riyadh
20:30	Yahya (yellow card) 2'; Al-Khaibari (yellow card) 31'; Talisca 56'; Ghareeb 88'	Report	Ighalo 10'; Cuéllar (yellow card) 39'; S. Al-Dawsari 65' (pen.); Hyun-soo (yellow card) 90+5'	Stadium: Mrsool Park; Attendance: 23,248; Referee: César Ramos (Mexico)

31 December 2022 11	Al-Khaleej	0–1	Al-Nassr	Dammam
20:30	Al-Samiri (yellow card) 51'; Souza (yellow card) 79'; Al Dubais (yellow card) 90+7'	Report	Aboubakar 5'; Talisca (yellow card) 54'; Al-Amri (yellow card) 90'	Stadium: Prince Mohamed bin Fahd Stadium; Attendance: 13,810; Referee: Sami Al-Jires

6 January 2023 (Note: This match originally set at 5 January 2023, but this round was postponed due to a heavy storm.) 12	Al-Nassr	2–0	Al-Tai	Riyadh
18:00	Talisca 42', 47'	Report	Al-Qumairi (yellow card) 22'; Al-Sultan (yellow card) 38'; Dener (yellow card) 49'	Stadium: Mrsool Park; Attendance: 11,721; Referee: Abdullah Al-Harbi

14 January 2023 13	Al-Shabab	0–0	Al-Nassr	Riyadh
20:30	Guanca (yellow card) 69'; Banega (yellow card) 77'	Report	Gustavo (yellow card) 67'; González (yellow card) 75'	Stadium: Prince Faisal bin Fahd Stadium; Attendance: 4,493; Referee: Clément Turpin (France)

22 January 2023 14	Al-Nassr	1–0	Al-Ettifaq	Riyadh
20:30	Talisca 31'	Report	Al-Mowalad (yellow card) 22'; Al-Mousa (yellow card) 86'	Stadium: Mrsool Park; Attendance: 22,862; Referee: Khaled Al-Teris

3 February 2023 15	Al-Fateh	2–2	Al-Nassr	Al-Hasa
18:00	Tello 12'; Bendebka 58', (yellow card) 63'; Al-Daheem (yellow card) 90'	Report	Talisca 42', (red card) 90+5'; Lajami (yellow card) 78'; Ronaldo (yellow card) 90', (goal) 90+3' (pen.)	Stadium: Prince Abdullah bin Jalawi Stadium; Attendance: 17,631; Referee: Fernando Rapallini (Argentina)

9 February 2023 16	Al-Wehda	0–4	Al-Nassr	Mecca
20:30	Yoda (yellow card) 77'	Report	Ronaldo 21', 40', 53' (pen.), 61'	Stadium: King Abdul Aziz Stadium; Attendance: 27,102; Referee: Sultan Al-Harbi

17 February 2023 17	Al-Nassr	2–1	Al-Taawoun	Riyadh
18:00	Ghareeb 17'; Madu 78'; Martínez (yellow card) 90+2'; Al-Amri (yellow card) 90+9'	Report	Medrán 47'	Stadium: Mrsool Park; Attendance: 22,347; Referee: Faisal Al-Blwi

25 February 2023 18	Damac	0–3	Al-Nassr	Abha
18:30	Chafaï (yellow card) 17'	Report	Ronaldo 18' (pen.), 23', 44'; Madu (yellow card) 30'; Al-Hassan (yellow card) 72'; Al-Amri (yellow card) 90+3'	Stadium: Prince Sultan bin Abdul Aziz Stadium; Attendance: 13,434; Referee: Khaled Al-Teris

3 March 2023 19	Al-Nassr	3–1	Al-Batin	Riyadh
20:30	Maran (yellow card) 90', (goal) 90+14'; Ghareeb 90+3'; Al-Aqidi (yellow card) 90+8'; Al-Fatil 90+12'	Report	López 17', (yellow card) 63'; Campaña (yellow card) 42'; Al-Shamlan (yellow card) 45+1'; Mudasiru (yellow card) 86'	Stadium: Mrsool Park; Attendance: 22,782; Referee: Sami Al-Jires

9 March 2023 20	Al-Ittihad	1–0	Al-Nassr	Jeddah
20:30	Bamsaud (yellow card) 68'; Romarinho 80'	Report	Konan (yellow card) 84'	Stadium: King Abdullah Sports City; Attendance: 57,244; Referee: Antonio Mateu Lahoz (Spain)

18 March 2023 21	Al-Nassr	2–1	Abha	Riyadh
20:30	Al-Khaibari (yellow card) 33'; Al-Sulaiheem (yellow card) 38'; Ronaldo 78'; Talisca 86' (pen.); S. Al-Ghannam (yellow card) 87'; Konan (yellow card) 90+7'	Report	Adam 26', (yellow card) 85'; Caicedo (yellow card) 32'; Sami (yellow card) 77' (yellow-red card) 80'; Atouchi (yellow card) 79'; Bguir (yellow card) 90+6'	Stadium: Mrsool Park; Attendance: 19,564; Referee: Fernando Rapallini (Argentina)

4 April 2023 22	Al-Adalah	0–5	Al-Nassr	Al-Hasa
22:00	Al-Hamdhi (yellow card) 34'	Report	Ronaldo 40' (pen.), 66'; Talisca 55', 78'; S. Al-Ghannam (yellow card) 61'; Yahya 90+8'	Stadium: Prince Abdullah bin Jalawi Stadium; Attendance: 18,025; Referee: Abdullah Al-Harbi

9 April 2023 23	Al-Fayha	0–0	Al-Nassr	Al Majma'ah
22:00	Ruiz (yellow card) 71'; Stojković (yellow card) 82'	Report	Talisca (yellow card) 20'	Stadium: Al Majma'ah Sports City; Attendance: 6,087; Referee: Tamás Bognár (Hungary)

18 April 2023 25	Al-Hilal	2–0	Al-Nassr	Riyadh
22:00	Ighalo 42' (pen.), 62' (pen.); Jang Hyun-soo (yellow card) 46'; Cuéllar (yellow card) 64'; Jahfali (yellow card) 90+14'	Report	Yahya (yellow card) 45+2'; Ronaldo (yellow card) 57'; Talisca (yellow card) 70'; González (yellow card) 90+13'	Stadium: King Fahd International Stadium; Attendance: 24,674; Referee: Michael Oliver (England)

28 April 2023 24	Al-Nassr	4–0	Al-Raed	Riyadh
21:30	Ronaldo 4'; Al-Khaibari (yellow card) 24'; Ghareeb 55'; Masharipov (yellow card) 83'; Maran 90'; Al-Sulaiheem 90+4'	Report	El Berkaoui (yellow card) 40'	Stadium: Al-Awwal Park; Attendance: 12,087; Referee: Mohammed Al-Hoaish

8 May 2023 26	Al-Nassr	1–1	Al-Khaleej	Riyadh
19:00	González 17'; Al-Hassan (yellow card) 39'; Boushal (yellow card) 90+1'	Report	Martins 4'; Souza (yellow card) 30'; Al-Owdah (yellow card) 52'; Al-Haidari (yellow card) 87'	Stadium: Al-Awwal Park; Attendance: 16,742; Referee: Majed Al-Shamrani

16 May 2023 27	Al-Tai	0–2	Al-Nassr	Ha'il
21:30	Fai (yellow card) 76'	Report	Al-Khaibari (yellow card) 18'; Ronaldo (yellow card) 48', (goal) 52' (pen.); Talisca 80'	Stadium: Prince Abdul Aziz bin Musa'ed Stadium; Attendance: 9,632; Referee: Abdullah Al-Kharboush

23 May 2023 28	Al-Nassr	3–2	Al-Shabab	Riyadh
21:30	Gustavo (yellow card) 30'; González (yellow card) 31'; Talisca 44'; Lajami (yellow card) 45+2'; Ghareeb 51'; Ronaldo 59'; Al-Najei (yellow card) 73'	Report	Guanca 25' (pen.), 40'; Mina (yellow card) 45+2'; Carlos (yellow card) 58'; Banega (yellow card) 72'; Krychowiak (yellow card) 90+1'	Stadium: Al-Awwal Park; Attendance: 19,045; Referee: Daniele Orsato (Italy)

27 May 2023 29	Al-Ettifaq	1–1	Al-Nassr	Dammam
21:00	Al-Khateeb (yellow card) 24'; Niakaté 43'; Özdemir (yellow card) 86'; Quaison (yellow card) 90+2'	Report	Al-Khaibari (yellow card) 22'; S. Al-Ghannam (yellow card) 44'; Boushal (yellow card) 53'; Gustavo 56'; Yahya (yellow card) 90+7'	Stadium: Prince Mohamed bin Fahd Stadium; Attendance: 17,183; Referee: Abdullah Al-Harbi

31 May 2023 30	Al-Nassr	3–0	Al-Fateh	Riyadh
21:00	Talisca 4', 66'; Maran 72'; Madu (yellow card) 74'	Report	Al-Jari (yellow card) 49'	Stadium: Al-Awwal Park; Attendance: 12,203; Referee: Artur Soares Dias (Portugal)

=== King Cup ===
All times are local, AST (UTC+3).

21 December 2022 Round of 16	Al-Nassr	2–0	Al-Adalah	Riyadh
21:00	Álvaro (yellow card) 40'; Yahya 41'; Al-Najei 85'; Talisca (yellow card) 90+8'	Report	Abo Abd (yellow card) 90+8'	Stadium: Prince Abdulrahman bin Saud Stadium; Referee: Mohammed Al-Esmaiel

14 March 2023 Quarter-finals	Al-Nassr	3–1	Abha	Riyadh
17:30	Al-Najei 1'; Al-Khaibari 21'; Al-Sulayhem (yellow card) 28'; Ronaldo (yellow card) 45+3'; Maran 49'	Report	Saddiki (yellow card) 25'; Adam 69'; Al-Jumayah (yellow card) 72'	Stadium: Mrsool Park; Attendance: 17,327; Referee: Andris Treimanis (Latvia)

24 April 2023 Semi-finals	Al-Nassr	0–1	Al-Wehda	Riyadh
21:00		Report	Beauguel 23'; Al-Hafith (yellow card) 24' (yellow-red card) 53'; Bakshween (yellow card) 60'; Al-Jayzani (yellow card) 88'; Munir (yellow card) 90+4'	Stadium: Al-Awwal Park; Attendance: 17,482; Referee: Radu Petrescu (Romania)

=== Super Cup ===
All times are local, AST (UTC+3).

26 January 2023 Semi-finals	Al-Ittihad	3–1	Al-Nassr	Riyadh
21:00	Romarinho 15'; Hamdallah 43', (yellow card) 83'; Z. Hawsawi (yellow card) 76'; Al-Bishi (yellow card) 90+1'; Al-Shamrani (yellow card) 90+2'; Al-Shanqeeti 90+3'	Report	Al-Najei (yellow card) 27'; Gustavo (yellow card) 45+1'; Talisca 67'	Stadium: King Fahd International Stadium; Attendance: 49,477; Referee: Danny Makkelie (Netherlands)

== Statistics ==
=== Appearances ===
Last updated on 31 May 2023.

No.	Pos	Nat	Player	Total		Pro League		King Cup		Super Cup	
No.	Pos	Nat	Player	Apps	Goals	Apps	Goals	Apps	Goals	Apps	Goals
Goalkeepers
1	GK	(Saudi Arabia) KSA	Amin Bukhari	1	0	0+1	0	0	0	0	0
22	GK	(Argentina) ARG	Agustín Rossi	8	0	6+1	0	0	0	1	0
33	GK	(Saudi Arabia) KSA	Waleed Abdullah	0	0	0	0	0	0	0	0
44	GK	(Saudi Arabia) KSA	Nawaf Al-Aqidi	13	0	11	0	2	0	0	0
62	GK	(Saudi Arabia) KSA	Abdulaziz Al-Awairdhy	0	0	0	0	0	0	0	0
Defenders
2	DF	(Saudi Arabia) KSA	Sultan Al-Ghannam	31	1	26+1	1	3	0	1	0
3	DF	(Saudi Arabia) KSA	Abdullah Madu	16	1	11+4	1	0	0	1	0
4	DF	(Saudi Arabia) KSA	Mohammed Al-Fatil	7	1	0+7	1	0	0	0	0
5	DF	(Saudi Arabia) KSA	Abdulelah Al-Amri	30	0	24+3	0	2	0	1	0
12	DF	(Saudi Arabia) KSA	Nawaf Boushal	12	0	1+9	0	0+1	0	0+1	0
13	DF	(Ivory Coast) CIV	Ghislain Konan	31	0	27	0	3	0	0+1	0
20	DF	(Saudi Arabia) KSA	Hamad Al Mansour	0	0	0	0	0	0	0	0
21	DF	(Spain) ESP	Álvaro González	25	1	22	1	3	0	0	0
27	DF	(Saudi Arabia) KSA	Majed Qasheesh	9	0	0+7	0	0+2	0	0	0
59	DF	(Saudi Arabia) KSA	Yousef Haqawi	0	0	0	0	0	0	0	0
78	DF	(Saudi Arabia) KSA	Ali Lajami	26	0	11+11	0	1+2	0	1	0
Midfielders
8	MF	(Saudi Arabia) KSA	Abdulmajeed Al-Sulayhem	27	1	10+13	1	2+1	0	0+1	0
10	MF	(Argentina) ARG	Pity Martínez	9	0	4+3	0	1	0	1	0
14	MF	(Saudi Arabia) KSA	Sami Al-Najei	27	4	17+7	2	2	2	1	0
17	MF	(Saudi Arabia) KSA	Abdullah Al-Khaibari	32	1	20+8	0	2+1	1	1	0
18	MF	(Brazil) BRA	Luiz Gustavo	32	5	29	5	2	0	1	0
19	MF	(Saudi Arabia) KSA	Ali Al-Hassan	24	0	8+13	0	1+2	0	0	0
23	MF	(Saudi Arabia) KSA	Ayman Yahya	22	5	10+11	4	1	1	0	0
29	MF	(Saudi Arabia) KSA	Abdulrahman Ghareeb	30	6	22+5	6	2	0	0+1	0
31	MF	(Saudi Arabia) KSA	Mohammed Sahlouli	0	0	0	0	0	0	0	0
46	MF	(Saudi Arabia) KSA	Abdulaziz Al-Elewai	1	0	1	0	0	0	0	0
77	MF	(Uzbekistan) UZB	Jaloliddin Masharipov	16	0	5+9	0	0+1	0	0+1	0
94	MF	(Brazil) BRA	Talisca	27	21	22+1	20	2+1	0	1	1
Forwards
7	FW	(Portugal) POR	Cristiano Ronaldo	19	14	16	14	2	0	1	0
16	FW	(Saudi Arabia) KSA	Mohammed Maran	18	4	1+15	3	1+1	1	0	0
30	FW	(Saudi Arabia) KSA	Meshari Al-Nemer	1	0	0+1	0	0	0	0	0
60	FW	(Saudi Arabia) KSA	Faisal Majrashi	0	0	0	0	0	0	0	0
Players sent out on loan this season
11	MF	(Saudi Arabia) KSA	Khalid Al-Ghannam	8	0	2+5	0	0+1	0	0	0
24	DF	(Saudi Arabia) KSA	Mansour Al-Shammari	1	0	0+1	0	0	0	0	0
Player who made an appearance this season but have left the club
9	FW	(Cameroon) CMR	Vincent Aboubakar	12	4	11	4	0+1	0	0	0
25	GK	(Colombia) COL	David Ospina	14	0	13	0	1	0	0	0
45	MF	(Saudi Arabia) KSA	Abdulfattah Asiri	1	0	0+1	0	0	0	0	0

=== Goalscorers ===
Rank	No.	Pos	Nat	Name	Pro League	King Cup	Super Cup	Total
1	94	MF	(Brazil)	Talisca	20	0	1	21
2	7	FW	(Portugal)	Cristiano Ronaldo	14	0	0	14
3	29	MF	(Saudi Arabia)	Abdulrahman Ghareeb	6	0	0	6
4	18	MF	(Brazil)	Luiz Gustavo	5	0	0	5
4	23	MF	(Saudi Arabia)	Ayman Yahya	4	1	0	5
6	9	FW	(Cameroon)	Vincent Aboubakar	4	0	0	4
6	14	MF	(Saudi Arabia)	Sami Al-Najei	2	2	0	4
6	16	FW	(Saudi Arabia)	Mohammed Maran	3	1	0	4
9	2	DF	(Saudi Arabia)	Sultan Al-Ghannam	1	0	0	1
9	3	DF	(Saudi Arabia)	Abdullah Madu	1	0	0	1
9	4	DF	(Saudi Arabia)	Mohammed Al-Fatil	1	0	0	1
9	8	MF	(Saudi Arabia)	Abdulmajeed Al-Sulayhem	1	0	0	1
9	17	MF	(Saudi Arabia)	Abdullah Al-Khaibari	0	1	0	1
9	21	DF	(Spain)	Álvaro González	1	0	0	1
Own goal					0	0	0	0
Total					63	5	1	69

Last Updated: 31 May 2023

=== Clean sheets ===
Rank	No.	Pos	Nat	Name	Pro League	King Cup	Super Cup	Total
1	25	GK	(Colombia)	David Ospina	8	1	0	9
2	44	GK	(Saudi Arabia)	Nawaf Al-Aqidi	6	0	0	6
3	22	GK	(Argentina)	Agustín Rossi	3	0	0	3
4	1	GK	(Saudi Arabia)	Amin Bukhari	1	0	0	1
Total					16	1	0	17

Last Updated: 31 May 2023
