= Majed Qasheesh =

Saudi Arabian footballer

Majed Qasheesh ماجد قشيش
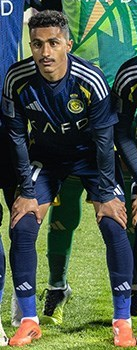
- Qasheesh in 2025 with Al Nassr

Personal information
- Full name: Majed Mohammed Ali Qasheesh
- Date of birth: 4 December 2001 (age 24)
- Place of birth: Saudi Arabia
- Height: 1.69 m (5 ft 7 in)
- Position: Left-back

Team information
- Current team: Al-Nassr
- Number: 50

Youth career
- Al-Nassr

Senior career*
Years	Team	Apps	(Gls)
2022–	Al-Nassr	17	(0)
2023–2024	→ Al-Hazem (loan)	26	(0)
2025–2026	→ Al-Fateh (loan)	10	(0)

International career
2022–	Saudi Arabia U23		
- * Club domestic league appearances and goals as of 12 September 2026

Majed Qasheesh (Arabic: ماجد قشيش; born 4 December 2001) is a Saudi Arabian professional footballer who plays as a left-back for Saudi Pro League club Al-Nassr.

== Club career ==
Qasheesh began his career at the youth team of Al-Nassr. On 17 September 2022, he signed his first professional contract with the club. He made his debut on 15 September 2022 in the 4–0 win over Al-Batin. On 7 September 2023, Qasheesh joined Al-Hazem on a one-year loan. On 27 August 2025, Qasheesh joined Al-Fateh on a one-year loan.

== Career statistics ==
=== Club ===
As of 27 May 2025

Club	Season	League		King Cup		Asia		Other		Total	
Club	Season	Apps	Goals	Apps	Goals	Apps	Goals	Apps	Goals	Apps	Goals
Al-Nassr	2022–23	7	0	2	0	—		—		9	0
Al-Nassr	2024–25	9	0	0	0	2	0	—		11	0
Al-Nassr	Total	16	0	2	0	2	0	0	0	20	0
Al-Hazem (loan)	2023–24	26	0	2	0	—		—		28	0
Al-Fateh (loan)	2025–26	0	0	0	0	—		—		0	0
Career totals		42	0	4	0	2	0	0	0	48	0

=== Honours ===
Al-Nassr

- Saudi Super Cup runners-up : 2024,
