= Sultan Al-Ghannam =

Saudi Arabian footballer (born 1994)

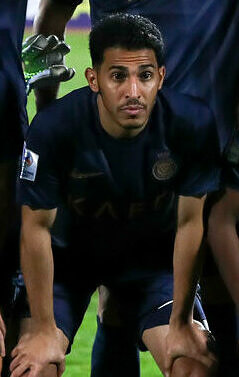
- Al-Ghannam with Al-Nassr in 2023

Personal information
- Full name: Sultan bin Abdullah bin Salem Al-Ghannam
- Date of birth: 6 May 1994 (age 32)
- Place of birth: Al Zulfi, Saudi Arabia
- Height: 1.73 m (5 ft 8 in)
- Position: Right-back

Team information
- Current team: Al-Nassr
- Number: 2

Youth career
- Al-Zulfi
- 2015–2016: Al-Faisaly

Senior career*
Years	Team	Apps	(Gls)
2012–2015	Al-Zulfi	40	(10)
2016–2018	Al-Faisaly	24	(0)
2018–	Al-Nassr	213	(11)

International career
2017–2024	Saudi Arabia	38	(0)
- * Club domestic league appearances and goals as of 23:07, 12 May 2026 (UTC)

Sultan bin Abdullah bin Salem Al-Ghannam (Arabic: سُلْطَان بْن عَبْد الله بْن سَالِم الْغَنَّام; born 6 May 1994) is a Saudi Arabian professional footballer who plays as a right-back for the Saudi Pro League club Al-Nassr.

== Club career ==
Al-Ghannam began his career at his hometown club Al-Zulfi. On 27 August 2015, Al-Ghannam joined the Pro League side Al-Faisaly.

On 12 March 2018, Al-Ghannam joined Al-Nassr on a free transfer, signing a four-year contract with the club. In his first season at the club, Al-Ghannam won the 2018–19 Pro League. On 21 September 2021, Al-Ghannam renewed his contract with Al-Nassr until the end of the 2023–24 season. On the 7th of October 2023, Al-Nassr announced that sultan had signed a new contract valid until 2028.

== International career ==
Al-Ghannam was included in Saudi Arabia's squad for the 2019 AFC Asian Cup in the United Arab Emirates. He was named in the squad for the 24th Arabian Gulf Cup and the squad for the 2022 FIFA World Cup. However, under the coaching of Roberto Mancini, Al-Ghannam was excluded from the squad for the 2023 AFC Asian Cup.

== Career statistics ==
As of 31 May 2024

Appearances and goals by club, season and competition
Club	Season	League			King's Cup		Crown Prince's Cup		Champions League		Other		Total	
Club	Season	Division	Apps	Goals	Apps	Goals	Apps	Goals	Apps	Goals	Apps	Goals	Apps	Goals
Al-Zulfi	2012–13	Saudi Third Division	8	1	—		2	0	—		—		10	1
Al-Zulfi	2013–14	Saudi Second Division	17	8	4	1	—		—		—		21	9
Al-Zulfi	2014–15	Saudi Second Division	15	1	3	0	—		—		—		18	1
Al-Zulfi	Total		40	10	7	1	2	0	—		—		49	11
Al-Faisaly	2015–16	Saudi Pro League	1	0	0	0	0	0	—		—		1	0
Al-Faisaly	2016–17	Saudi Pro League	2	0	1	0	0	0	—		—		3	0
Al-Faisaly	2017–18	Saudi Pro League	21	0	4	0	1	0	—		—		26	0
Al-Faisaly	Total		24	0	5	0	1	0	—		—		30	0
Al-Nassr	2018–19	Saudi Pro League	26	2	2	0	—		8 (Note: Appearances in AFC Champions League)	1	4 (Note: Appearance(s) in Arab Club Champions Cup)	0	40	3
Al-Nassr	2019–20	Saudi Pro League	28	2	3	0	—		8	0	1 (Note: Appearance(s) in Saudi Super Cup)	0	40	2
Al-Nassr	2020–21	Saudi Pro League	25	1	3	0	—		9	0	1	0	38	1
Al-Nassr	2021–22	Saudi Pro League	25	2	2	0	—		—		—		27	2
Al-Nassr	2022–23	Saudi Pro League	27	1	3	0	—		—		1	0	31	1
Al-Nassr	2023–24	Saudi Pro League	23	1	3	0	—		8	1	6 (Note: 5 appearances and one goal in Arab Club Champions Cup, and one appearance in Saudi Super Cup)	1	40	3
Al-Nassr	2024-25	Saudi Pro League	27	2	2	0	—		9	1	2	0	40	3
Al-Nassr	2025-26	Saudi Pro League	32	0	2	0	—		9	0	2	0	45	0
Al-Nassr	Total		213	11	20	0	0	0	51	3	17	1	301	15
Career total			277	21	32	1	3	0	51	3	17	1	380	26

== Honours ==
Al-Nassr

- Saudi Pro League: 2018–19, 2025–26
- Saudi Super Cup: 2019, 2020, runners-up : 2024,
- Arab Club Champions Cup: 2023
