= Bento (footballer) =

Brazilian footballer (born 1999)

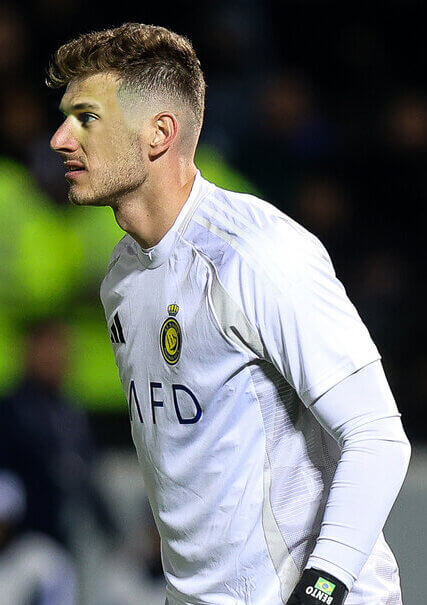
- Bento with Al-Nassr in 2025

Personal information
- Full name: Bento Matheus Krepski
- Date of birth: 10 June 1999 (age 27)
- Place of birth: Curitiba, Paraná, Brazil
- Height: 1.90 m (6 ft 3 in)
- Position: Goalkeeper

Team information
- Current team: Al-Nassr
- Number: 24

Youth career
- 2013–2019: Athletico Paranaense

Senior career*
| Years | Team | Apps | (Gls) |
| 2020–2024 | Athletico Paranaense | 164 | (0) |
| 2024– | Al-Nassr | 64 | (0) |

International career^{‡}
| 2024– | Brazil | 7 | (0) |
- * Club domestic league appearances and goals as of 22:53, 29 October 2026 (UTC) ‡ National team caps and goals as of 03:50, 1 April 2026 (UTC)

Bento Matheus Krepski (born 10 June 1999), known simply as Bento (Brazilian Portuguese: [ˈbẽtu]), is a Brazilian professional footballer who plays as a goalkeeper for Saudi Pro League club Al-Nassr and the Brazil national team.

== Club career ==
=== Athletico Paranaense ===
Bento with Athletico Paranaense in 2022

Born in Curitiba, Paraná, Bento joined Athletico Paranaense' youth setup in 2013, at the age of 14. Promoted to the first team for the 2020 season, he was initially a fifth-choice behind Santos, Jandrei, Anderson and Caio, and renewed his contract until 2023 in July of that year.

On 25 November 2020, as both Santos and Jandrei tested positive for COVID-19, Bento made his first team debut by starting in a 1–1 Copa Libertadores home draw against River Plate. He made his Série A debut three days later, starting in a 3–0 away loss against Palmeiras.

On 30 March 2021, Bento renewed his contract with Furacão until December 2024. He further extended his link until 2025 on 26 October, and became a first-choice in the 2022 season, after Santos left for Flamengo.

=== Al-Nassr ===
On 17 July 2024, Bento signed for Saudi Pro League club Al-Nassr until 2028. He made his debut abroad on 14 August, in a 2–0 away win against Al-Taawoun in the 2024 Saudi Super Cup semifinal, keeping a clean sheet.

On 12 May 2026, he conceded a stoppage-time own goal from a throw-in in the final minute against rivals Al-Hilal, squandering a lead that could have secured the 2025–26 league title in a match that ended in a 1–1 draw.

== International career ==
In August 2023, Bento received his first call-up to the Brazil senior national team by interim head coach Fernando Diniz, for two 2026 FIFA World Cup qualification matches against Bolivia and Peru.

He made his debut on 23 March 2024 in a 1–0 friendly match win against England.

== Career statistics ==
=== Club ===
As of match played 2 November 2026

Appearances and goals by club, season and competition
| Club | Season | League | | | State league (Note: Includes Campeonato Paranaense) | | National cup (Note: Includes Copa do Brasil, King's Cup) | | Continental | | Other | | Total | |
| Club | Season | Division | Apps | Goals | Apps | Goals | Apps | Goals | Apps | Goals | Apps | Goals | Apps | Goals |
|---|---|---|---|---|---|---|---|---|---|---|---|---|---|---|
| Athletico Paranaense | 2020 | Série A | 1 | 0 | 0 | 0 | 0 | 0 | 2 (Note: Appearances in Copa Libertadores) | 0 | 0 | 0 | 3 | 0 |
| Athletico Paranaense | 2021 | Série A | 9 | 0 | 5 | 0 | 2 | 0 | 4 (Note: Appearances in Copa Sudamericana) | 0 | — | | 20 | 0 |
| Athletico Paranaense | 2022 | Série A | 33 | 0 | 0 | 0 | 6 | 0 | 13 | 0 | 0 | 0 | 52 | 0 |
| Athletico Paranaense | 2023 | Série A | 33 | 0 | 15 | 0 | 6 | 0 | 8 | 0 | — | | 62 | 0 |
| Athletico Paranaense | 2024 | Série A | 7 | 0 | 13 | 0 | 2 | 0 | 5 | 0 | — | | 27 | 0 |
| Athletico Paranaense | Total | | 83 | 0 | 33 | 0 | 16 | 0 | 32 | 0 | 0 | 0 | 164 | 0 |
| Al-Nassr | 2024–25 | Saudi Pro League | 34 | 0 | — | | 2 | 0 | 11 (Note: Appearances in AFC Champions League Elite) | 0 | 2 (Note: Appearances in Saudi Super Cup) | 0 | 49 | 0 |
| Al-Nassr | 2025–26 | Saudi Pro League | 21 | 0 | — | | 2 | 0 | 9 (Note: Appearances in AFC Champions League Two) | 0 | 2 | 0 | 34 | 0 |
| Al-Nassr | 2026–27 | Saudi Pro League | 9 | 0 | — | | 1 | 0 | 2 | 0 | 0 | 0 | 11 | 0 |
| Al-Nassr | Total | | 64 | 0 | — | | 5 | 0 | 22 | 0 | 4 | 0 | 95 | 0 |
| Career total | | | 147 | 0 | 33 | 0 | 21 | 0 | 54 | 0 | 4 | 0 | 258 | 0 |

=== International ===
As of match played 31 March 2026

Appearances and goals by national team and year
| National team | Year | Apps | Goals |
|---|---|---|---|
| Brazil | 2024 | 2 | 0 |
| Brazil | 2025 | 4 | 0 |
| Brazil | 2026 | 1 | 0 |
| Total | | 7 | 0 |

== Honours ==
Athletico Paranaense

- Copa Sudamericana: 2021
- Campeonato Paranaense: 2020, 2023, 2024

Al Nassr

- Saudi Pro League: 2025–26
