= Abdulmajeed Al-Sulaiheem =

Saudi Arabian footballer (born 1994)

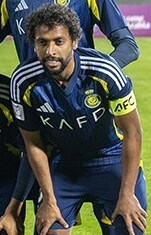
- Al-Sulaiheem with Al-Nassr in 2025

Personal information
- Full name: Abdulmajeed Mohammed Al-Sulaiheem
- Date of birth: 15 May 1994 (age 32)
- Place of birth: Riyadh, Saudi Arabia
- Height: 1.65 m (5 ft 5 in)
- Position: Midfielder

Team information
- Current team: Al-Ula (on loan from Al-Nassr)
- Number: 8

Youth career
- Al-Shabab

Senior career*
Years	Team	Apps	(Gls)
2013–2020	Al-Shabab	132	(10)
2018	→ Rayo Vallecano (loan)	0	(0)
2020–	Al-Nassr	89	(6)
2025–	→ Al-Ula (loan)	18	(3)

International career^{‡}
2017–2020	Saudi Arabia	3	(0)
- * Club domestic league appearances and goals as of 22:50, 26 May 2025 (UTC) ‡ National team caps and goals as of 20:55, 14 November 2020 (UTC)

Abdulmajeed Al-Sulaiheem (Arabic: عبد المجيد الصليهم; born 15 May 1994) is a Saudi Arabian professional footballer who plays as a midfielder for Saudi Pro League club Al-Ula on loan from Al-Nassr.

== Career ==
Al-Sulaiheem began his career at Al-Shabab. He made his debut during the 2013–14 season. In February 2018, he joined Spanish side Rayo Vallecano on a six-month loan but did not play a match for them.

On 26 January 2020, Al-Sulaiheem signed a pre-contract agreement with Al-Nassr. He officially joined the club following the conclusion of the 2019–20 season. On 22 August 2025, Al-Sulaiheem joined Saudi First Division League side Al-Ula on loan.

=== International career ===
Al-Sulaiheem has played for the Saudi Arabia national team on three occasions.

== Career statistics ==
=== Club ===
As of 31 May 2025

Club	Season	League		National Cup		League Cup		Continental		Other		Total	
Club	Season	Apps	Goals	Apps	Goals	Apps	Goals	Apps	Goals	Apps	Goals	Apps	Goals
Al-Shabab	2013–14	12	1	1	0	3	0	4	0	—		20	1
Al-Shabab	2014–15	19	1	2	1	2	0	2	0	1 (Note: Appearances in Saudi Super Cup)	0	26	2
Al-Shabab	2015–16	14	0	1	0	3	0	—		—		18	0
Al-Shabab	2016–17	22	3	1	0	3	1	—		—		26	4
Al-Shabab	2017–18	16	0	1	0	0	0	—		—		17	0
Al-Shabab	2018–19	23	2	2	0	—		—		—		25	2
Al-Shabab	2019–20	26	3	1	0	—		—		6 (Note: Appearances in Arab Club Champions Cup)	0	33	3
Al-Shabab	Total	132	10	9	1	11	1	6	0	7	0	165	12
Rayo Vallecano (loan)	2017–18	0	0	0	0	—		—		—		0	0
Al-Nassr	2020–21	19	2	4	0	—		10	1	1	0	34	3
Al-Nassr	2021–22	18	2	0	0	—		2	0	—		20	2
Al-Nassr	2022–23	23	1	3	0	—		—		1	0	27	1
Al-Nassr	2023–24	16	1	2	0	—		7	0	4	0	29	1
Al-Nassr	2024–25	13	0	0	0	—		3	0	0	0	16	0
Al-Nassr	Total	89	6	9	0	0	0	22	1	6	0	126	7
Al-Ula (loan)	2025–26	0	0	—		—		—		—		0	0
Career Total		221	16	18	1	11	1	28	1	13	0	291	19

== Honours ==
Al-Shabab

- King's Cup: 2014
- Saudi Super Cup: 2014

Rayo Vallecano

- Segunda División: 2017–18

Al-Nassr

- Saudi Super Cup: 2020, runners-up: 2024
- Arab Club Champions Cup: 2023
- King's Cup runners-up: 2024
