= Salem Al-Najdi =

Saudi Arabian footballer

- Al-Najdi with Al Nassr in 2025

Personal information
- Full name: Salem Abdullah Al-Najdi
- Date of birth: January 27, 2003 (age 23)
- Place of birth: Saudi Arabia
- Height: 1.78 m (5 ft 10 in)
- Positions: Left-back; left winger

Team information
- Current team: Al-Nassr
- Number: 83

Youth career
- Al-Fateh

Senior career*
Years	Team	Apps	(Gls)
2022–2024	Al-Fateh	42	(3)
2024–	Al-Nassr	44	(1)

International career^{‡}
2021–2023	Saudi Arabia U20	9	(1)
2024–	Saudi Arabia U23	9	(0)
Medal record
Men's football
Representing Saudi Arabia
Arab Cup U-20
Winner	2022 Saudi Arabia
- * Club domestic league appearances and goals as of 23 October 2026 ‡ National team caps and goals as of 4 October 2025

Salem Al-Najdi (Arabic: سالم النجدي; born 27 January 2003) is a Saudi professional footballer who plays as a left-back or a left winger for Al-Nassr.

== Club career ==
Al-Najdi began his career at the youth team of Al-Fateh. On 23 August 2021, Al-Najdi signed his first professional contract with the club. He was called up to the first-team after a number of first-team players tested positive for COVID-19. Al-Najdi was named on the bench for the first time on 1 January 2022 in the match against Al-Nassr. On 27 June 2022, Al-Najdi made his first-team debut for Al-Fateh in the 2–1 loss to Al-Nassr.

On 15 August 2024, Al-Najdi joined Al-Nassr on a five-year contract.

== International career ==
Al-Najdi was called up to the under-20 national team for the first time on 12 January 2021. He was named in the squad taking part in the 2022 Arab Cup U-20. He started every match throughout the competition as the Green Falcons won their second consecutive title.

In June 2022, he took part in the Maurice Revello Tournament in France with Saudi Arabia team.

== Honours ==
Al-Nassr

- Saudi Pro League: 2025–26
- Saudi Super Cup: runners-up 2024

Saudi Arabia U20

- Arab Cup U-20: 2022
