= Ali Lajami =

Saudi Arabian footballer (born 1996)

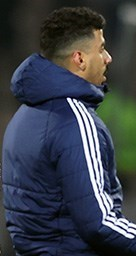
- Lajami in 2025

Personal information
- Full name: Ali Mohammed Lajami
- Date of birth: 24 April 1996 (age 30)
- Place of birth: Qatif, Saudi Arabia
- Height: 1.78 m (5 ft 10 in)
- Position: Defender

Team information
- Current team: Al-Hilal
- Number: 78

Youth career
- ???–2014: Al-Muheet
- 2014–2015: Al-Khaleej

Senior career*
Years	Team	Apps	(Gls)
2015–2018	Al-Khaleej	51	(3)
2018–2020	Al-Fateh	37	(1)
2020–2025	Al-Nassr	95	(2)
2025–	Al-Hilal	32	(0)

International career^{‡}
2016–2018	Saudi Arabia U23		
2019–	Saudi Arabia	29	(1)
- * Club domestic league appearances and goals as of 31 October 2026 ‡ National team caps and goals as of 17 November 2026

Ali Mohammed Lajami (Arabic: علي محمد لاجامي; born 24 April 1996) is a Saudi Arabian professional footballer who plays as a defender for Saudi Pro League club Al-Hilal and the Saudi Arabia national team. As of August 2024, his twin brother Qassem Lajami also plays as a defender for Saudi Pro league side Al-Qadsiah.

== Club Career ==
Lajami began his career at the youth teams of Al-Muheet. On 29 July 2014, Lajami and his twin brother, Qassem, both joined Al-Khaleej. He made his debut on the last matchday of the 2014–15 season as a substitute in a 4–4 draw against Al-Taawoun. On 24 July 2018, Lajami joined Al-Fateh on a four-year deal. On 9 September 2020, Lajami joined Al-Nassr on a five-year deal. On 27 May 2025, Lajami joined derby rivals Al-Hilal on a free transfer.

== International Career ==
On 31 May 2026, he was named in the 26-man squad for the 2026 FIFA World Cup.

== Career statistics ==
=== Club ===
As of match played 31 May 2024

Appearances and goals by club, season and competition
Club	Season	League			King Cup		Asia		Other		Total	
Club	Season	Division	Apps	Goals	Apps	Goals	Apps	Goals	Apps	Goals	Apps	Goals
Al-Khaleej	2014–15	SPL	1	0	0	0	—		0	0	1	0
Al-Khaleej	2015–16	SPL	17	2	0	0	—		2 (Note: Appearances in Crown Prince Cup)	0	19	2
Al-Khaleej	2016–17	SPL	18	1	1	1	—		1	0	20	2
Al-Khaleej	2017–18	MS League	15	0	1	0	—		—		16	0
Al-Khaleej	Total		51	3	2	1	0	0	3	0	56	4
Al-Fateh	2018–19	SPL	15	1	1	0	—		—		16	1
Al-Fateh	2019–20	SPL	22	0	2	0	—		—		24	0
Al-Fateh	Total		37	1	3	0	0	0	0	0	40	1
Al-Nassr	2020–21	SPL	11	1	2	0	5	0	1 (Note: Appearance(s) in the Saudi Super Cup)	0	19	1
Al-Nassr	2021–22	SPL	20	1	0	0	1	0	—		21	1
Al-Nassr	2022–23	SPL	22	0	3	0	—		1	0	26	0
Al-Nassr	2023–24	SPL	18	0	3	0	5	0	6 (Note: Five appearances in the Arab Club Champions Cup, and one appearance in the Saudi Super Cup)	0	32	0
Al-Nassr	Total		71	2	8	0	11	0	8	0	98	2
Career total			159	6	13	1	11	0	11	0	194	7

=== International ===
Scores and results list Saudi Arabia's goal tally first.

No.	Date	Venue	Opponent	Score	Result	Competition
1.	11 June 2024	KSU Stadium, Riyadh, Saudi Arabia	Jordan	1–0	1–2	2026 FIFA World Cup qualification

== Honours ==
Al-Nassr

- Saudi Super Cup: 2020; runner-up: 2024,
- Arab Club Champions Cup: 2023
- King's Cup runner-up: 2023–24
