= Musalli Al-Muammar =

President of Al Nassr FC

Musalli Al-Muammar is the former President of Al Nassr FC. He is a former head of the Saudi Pro League.

He holds a bachelor's degree in finance from King Fahad University of Petroleum and Minerals, a master's degree in marketing communications from Manchester Metropolitan University, and a global executive masters in international sports law from the Higher Institute of Law and Economics in Spain.
