= Mohammed Al-Fatil =

Saudi Arabian footballer

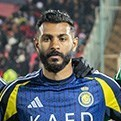
- Mohammed Al-Fatil for Al-Nassr in 2025

Personal information
- Full name: Mohammed Abdulhakeem Al-Fatil
- Date of birth: January 4, 1992 (age 34)
- Place of birth: Qatif, Saudi Arabia
- Height: 1.79 m (5 ft 10 in)
- Position: Centre-back

Team information
- Current team: Al-Najma
- Number: 33

Youth career
- 2002–2009: Al-Taraji
- 2009–2012: Al-Ahli

Senior career*
| Years | Team | Apps | (Gls) |
| 2012–2021 | Al-Ahli | 101 | (5) |
| 2021–2025 | Al-Nassr | 45 | (3) |
| 2026– | Al-Najma | 0 | (0) |

International career^{‡}
| 2010–2011 | Saudi Arabia U-20 | 6 | (1) |
| 2012 | Saudi Arabia U-23 | 4 | (0) |
| 2012– | Saudi Arabia | 15 | (1) |
- * Club domestic league appearances and goals as of 22:50, 26 May 2025 (UTC) ‡ National team caps and goals as of 20:55, 21 January 2019 (UTC)

Mohammed Abdulhakeem Al-Fatil (Arabic: مُحَمَّد عَبْد الْحَكِيم آل فَتِيل; born 4 January 1992) is a Saudi Arabian professional footballer who plays as a centre-back for Al-Najma and the Saudi Arabia national team.

== Career ==
Al Fatil started his career at Al-Taraji in his hometown of Qatif. On 31 May 2009, Al Fatil signed for Al-Ahli and joined their youth team. He made his first-team debut on 11 January 2012 in the 4–0 away win against Najran in the 16th round of the Pro League. Al Fatil signed his first professional contract with the club alongside 27 other players on 25 June 2012. On 11 January 2015, Al Fatil signed a new three-year deal with Al-Ahli. On 3 May 2018, Al Fatil renewed his contract with Al-Ahli for another three years. On 4 August 2021, Al Fatil joined Al-Nassr. On 12 February 2026, Al Fatil joined Al-Najma.

== Career statistics ==
=== Club ===
As of match played 31 May 2024

| Club | Season | League | | King Cup | | Crown Prince Cup | | Asia | | Other | | Total | |
| Club | Season | Apps | Goals | Apps | Goals | Apps | Goals | Apps | Goals | Apps | Goals | Apps | Goals |
|---|---|---|---|---|---|---|---|---|---|---|---|---|---|
| Al-Ahli | 2011–12 | 2 | 0 | 2 | 0 | 0 | 0 | 2 | 0 | — | | 6 | 0 |
| Al-Ahli | 2012–13 | 0 | 0 | 0 | 0 | 0 | 0 | 0 | 0 | — | | 0 | 0 |
| Al-Ahli | 2013–14 | 7 | 1 | 1 | 0 | 1 | 1 | — | | — | | 9 | 2 |
| Al-Ahli | 2014–15 | 0 | 0 | 0 | 0 | 0 | 0 | 1 | 0 | — | | 1 | 0 |
| Al-Ahli | 2015–16 | 8 | 1 | 3 | 0 | 2 | 0 | 5 | 1 | — | | 18 | 2 |
| Al-Ahli | 2016–17 | 21 | 1 | 4 | 0 | 2 | 0 | 6 | 0 | 1 (Note: Appearances in Saudi Super Cup) | 0 | 34 | 1 |
| Al-Ahli | 2017–18 | 5 | 0 | 2 | 0 | — | | 2 | 0 | — | | 9 | 0 |
| Al-Ahli | 2018–19 | 22 | 1 | 0 | 0 | — | | 5 | 0 | 5 (Note: Appearances in Arab Club Champions Cup) | 0 | 32 | 1 |
| Al-Ahli | 2019–20 | 15 | 0 | 3 | 0 | — | | 7 | 0 | — | | 25 | 0 |
| Al-Ahli | 2020–21 | 21 | 1 | 0 | 0 | — | | 6 | 0 | — | | 27 | 1 |
| Al-Ahli | Total | 101 | 5 | 15 | 0 | 5 | 1 | 34 | 1 | 6 | 0 | 161 | 7 |
| Al-Nassr | 2021–22 | 4 | 0 | 0 | 0 | — | | 1 | 0 | — | | 5 | 0 |
| Al-Nassr | 2022–23 | 7 | 1 | 0 | 0 | — | | — | | 0 | 0 | 7 | 1 |
| Al-Nassr | 2023–24 | 17 | 1 | 1 | 0 | — | | 5 | 0 | 2 1 | 0 | 26 | 1 |
| Al-Nassr | Total | 28 | 2 | 1 | 0 | 0 | 0 | 6 | 0 | 3 | 0 | 38 | 2 |
| Career totals | | 129 | 7 | 16 | 0 | 5 | 1 | 40 | 1 | 9 | 0 | 199 | 9 |

=== International ===
Statistics accurate as of match played 21 January 2019.

Saudi Arabia
| Year | Apps | Goals |
|---|---|---|
| 2012 | 3 | 0 |
| 2016 | 1 | 0 |
| 2017 | 4 | 0 |
| 2018 | 3 | 0 |
| 2019 | 4 | 1 |
| Total | 15 | 1 |

=== International goals ===
Scores and results list Saudi Arabia's goal tally first.

| Goal | Date | Venue | Opponent | Score | Result | Competition |
|---|---|---|---|---|---|---|
| 1. | 8 January 2019 | Maktoum Bin Rashid Al Maktoum Stadium, Dubai | North Korea | 2–0 | 4–0 | 2019 AFC Asian Cup |

== Honours ==
Al-Ahli

- Saudi Pro League: 2015–16
- King's Cup: 2012, 2016
- Crown Prince's Cup: 2014–15
- Saudi Super Cup: 2016

Al-Nassr

- Arab Club Champions Cup: 2023
- King's Cup runners-up : 2023
- Saudi Super Cup runners-up : 2024,
