= Ayman Yahya =

Saudi Arabian footballer (born 2001)

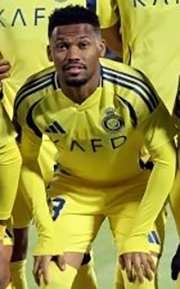
- Yahya in 2025

Personal information
- Full name: Ayman Yahya Salem Ahmed
- Date of birth: 14 May 2001 (age 25)
- Place of birth: Riyadh, Saudi Arabia
- Height: 1.65 m (5 ft 5 in)
- Positions: Winger; full-back

Team information
- Current team: Al-Nassr
- Number: 23

Youth career
- Al-Nassr

Senior career*
Years	Team	Apps	(Gls)
2019–	Al-Nassr	126	(15)
2022	→ Al-Ahli (loan)	11	(0)

International career^{‡}
2018–2020	Saudi Arabia U20		
2020–2023	Saudi Arabia U23	12	(6)
2020–	Saudi Arabia	26	(0)
Medal record
Men's football
Representing Saudi Arabia
AFC U-23 Asian Cup
Winner	2022 Uzbekistan
- * Club domestic league appearances and goals as of 29 October 2026 ‡ National team caps and goals as of 10 June 2026

Ayman Yahya Salem Ahmed (Arabic: أَيْمَن يَحْيَى سَالِم أَحْمَد, born 14 May 2001) is a Saudi Arabian professional footballer who plays as a winger or full-back for Saudi Pro League club Al-Nassr and the Saudi Arabia national team.

== Club career ==
=== Al-Nassr ===
Originally an Al-Nassr youth player, Yahya made his first-team debut for the club in an SPL game against Al-Hazem in 2019. On 31 May 2024, he equalised for Al-Nassr in the King's Cup final against Al-Hilal, putting the score at 1–1 after 88 minutes; the team later lost on penalties. On 14 August, in the 2024 Saudi Super Cup, he scored the opener in a 2–0 win against Al-Taawoun. On 13 February 2025, he set up Jhon Durán and then scored in a 2–3 away league win vs Al-Ahli.

== International career ==
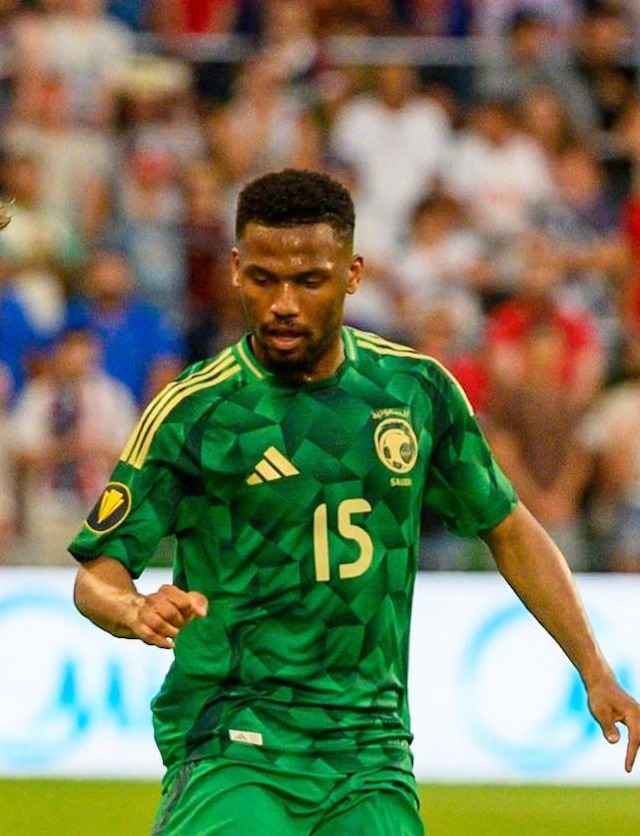
Yahya with the Saudi national team in 2025

He made his international debut on 14 November 2020 in a friendly match, a 3–0 victory against Jamaica. He was part of the Saudi Arabia squad that participated in the 2021 FIFA Arab Cup. He played all three group stage matches, but Saudi Arabia failed to advance to the quarter-finals after two defeats and a draw.

He then played with the under-23 team at the 2020 AFC U-23 Championship. During the tournament, held in Thailand, he appeared in two matches including the final. Saudi Arabia lost in the final to South Korea after extra time.

He subsequently represented the Olympic team at the 2020 Summer Olympics, held in Tokyo in the summer of 2021. He played in two matches during the Olympic tournament. With three defeats in three games, Saudi Arabia was eliminated in the group stage.

He later participated with the under-23 team in the 2022 AFC U-23 Championship, held in Uzbekistan. He played in six matches and stood out by scoring three goals, including one in the semi-final against Australia. Saudi Arabia won the final 2–0 against Uzbekistan, and he was named the tournament's best player.

In June 2023, Yahya took part in the Maurice Revello Tournament in France with Saudi Arabia.

On 31 May 2026, he was named in the 26-man squad for the 2026 FIFA World Cup.

== Personal life ==
Yahya was born in Riyadh. His older brother Ali is also a professional player.

== Career statistics ==
=== Club ===
As of 31 May 2024

Club	Season	League		National Cup		Continental		Other		Total	
Club	Season	Apps	Goals	Apps	Goals	Apps	Goals	Apps	Goals	Apps	Goals
Al-Nassr	2019–20	4	0	2	1	6	0	—		12	1
Al-Nassr	2020–21	15	3	1	1	0	0	0	0	16	4
Al-Nassr	2021–22	10	0	1	0	2	0	—		13	0
Al-Nassr	2022–23	21	4	1	1	—		0	0	22	5
Al-Nassr	2023–24	17	1	5	2	9	0	0	0	31	3
Total		67	8	10	5	17	0	0	0	94	13
Al-Ahli (loan)	2021–22	11	0	1	0	0	0	—		12	0
Career Total		78	8	11	5	17	0	0	0	106	13

== Honours ==
Al-Nassr

- Saudi Pro League: 2025–26
- Saudi Super Cup: 2020; runner-up 2024
- Arab Club Champions Cup: 2023

Saudi Arabia

- AFC U-23 Asian Cup: 2022

Individual

- AFC U-23 Asian Cup Most Valuable Player: 2022
- AFC U-23 Asian Cup Top Scorer: 2022
