= Meshari Al-Nemer =

Saudi Arabian footballer

Meshari Al-Nemer مشاري النمر
Personal information
- Full name: Meshari Fahad Al-Nemer
- Date of birth: 5 August 2003 (age 23)
- Place of birth: Saudi Arabia
- Height: 1.80 m (5 ft 11 in)
- Position: Striker

Team information
- Current team: Al-Diriyah
- Number: 75

Youth career
- Al Nassr

Senior career*
Years	Team	Apps	(Gls)
2022–2025	Al Nassr	11	(2)
2024–2025	→ Damac (loan)	23	(2)
2025–	Al-Diriyah	18	(4)

International career
2021–2023	Saudi Arabia U20	5	(1)
2023–	Saudi Arabia U23		
Medal record
Men's football
Representing Saudi Arabia
Arab Cup U-20
Winner	2021 Egypt
- * Club domestic league appearances and goals as of 26 August 2026

Meshari Al-Nemer (Arabic: مشاري النمر; born 5 August 2003) is a Saudi Arabian professional footballer who plays as a striker for Saudi Pro League club Al-Diriyah.

== Club career ==
Al-Nemer began his career at the youth team of Al-Nassr. On 8 August 2021, he signed his first professional contract with the club. He made his debut on 27 June 2022 in the 2–1 win over Al-Fateh, replacing Vincent Aboubakar.

On 2 September 2024, Al-Nemer joined Damac on a one-year loan.

On 11 September 2025, Al-Nemer joined Al-Diriyah on a three-year contract.

== International career ==
=== Saudi Arabia U20 ===
Meshari was part of the Saudi Arabia U20 in the Arab Cup in 2021, which was held in Egypt. On 24 June 2021 in the group stage match against Yemen, Al-Nemer scored the second goal in a 2–1 win. On 27 June 2021 in the final group stage match against Tunisia, Al-Nemer scored Saudi Arabia's only goal in a 2–1 defeat. In the quarter-finals match against Senegal, Al-Nemer saw his penalty saved in the penalty shoot-outs. Despite this, the Green Falcons qualified to the semi-finals after goalkeeper Osama Al-Mermesh saved Senegal's final penalty. In the final, Al-Nemer came off the bench in the 69th minute replacing Abdullah Radif as the Green Falcons defeated Algeria to win their first title.

== Honours ==
Saudi Arabia U20

- Arab Cup U-20: 2021
