= 2024 Saudi Super Cup =

The Diriyah Saudi Super Cup

Tournament details
- Host country: Saudi Arabia
- City: Abha
- Dates: 13 – 17 August 2024
- Teams: 4

Final positions
- Champions: Al-Hilal (5th title)
- Runners-up: Al-Nassr

Tournament statistics
- Matches played: 3
- Goals scored: 9 (3 per match)
- Attendance: 33,770 (11,257 per match)
- Top scorer: Aleksandar Mitrović (3 goals)
- Best player: Aleksandar Mitrović (Al-Hilal)
- Best goalkeeper: Yassine Bounou (Al-Hilal)

The 2024 Saudi Super Cup (also known as The Diriyah Saudi Super Cup for sponsorship reasons) was the 11th edition of the Saudi Super Cup, an annual football competition for clubs in the Saudi Arabian football league system that were successful in its major competitions in the preceding season.

On 4 July 2024, the Saudi Arabian Football Federation (SAFF) in collaboration with the Saudi Tourism Authority and the Asir Development Authority announced that the Super Cup would be held in Abha from 13 to 17 August 2024.

Al-Hilal defeated Al-Nassr 4–1 in the final to win their record-extending fifth title.

== Qualification ==
The tournament was supposed to feature the winners and runners-up of the 2023–24 King's Cup and 2023–24 Saudi Pro League. However, since Al-Hilal were both the Pro League and King's Cup winners and Al-Nassr were the Pro League and King's Cup runners-up, the extra two spots were awarded to the Pro League third-placed and fourth-placed teams.

=== Qualified teams ===
The following four teams qualified for the tournament.

Team	Method of qualification	Appearance	Last appearance as	Years performance		
Team	Method of qualification	Appearance	Last appearance as	Winner(s)	Runners-up	Semi-finalists
Al-Hilal	2023–24 Saudi Pro League and 2023–24 King's Cup winners	8th	2023 winners	4	2	1
Al-Nassr	2023–24 Saudi Pro League and 2023–24 King's Cup runners-up	7th	2023 semi-finalists	2	2	2
Al-Ahli	2023–24 Saudi Pro League third place	2nd	2016 winners	1	–	–
Al-Taawoun	2023–24 Saudi Pro League fourth place	2nd	2019 runners-up	–	1	–

== Draw ==
The draw was held on 28 May 2024 at the SSC headquarters in Riyadh. There was no restriction in it.

== Venue ==
The 2024 Saudi Super Cup took place in Abha between 13 and 17 August. All matches were held in the Prince Sultan bin Abdulaziz Sports City. It was the first time the Super Cup was held in Abha and the seventh time in Saudi Arabia.

2024 Saudi Super Cup is located in Saudi Arabia	Abha
2024 Saudi Super Cup is located in Saudi Arabia	Prince Sultan bin Abdulaziz Sports City
2024 Saudi Super Cup is located in Saudi Arabia	Capacity: 25,000

== Matches ==
- Times listed are UTC+03:00.

=== Bracket ===
Semi-finals
14 August 2024 – Abha
Al-Taawoun	0
Al-Nassr	2
13 August 2024 – Abha
Al-Hilal (p)	1 (4)
Al-Ahli	1 (1)

Final
17 August 2024 – Abha
Al-Nassr	1
Al-Hilal	4

=== Semi-finals ===
13 August 2024
19:15

Al-Hilal	1–1	Al-Ahli
Mitrović 90+1'	Report	Firmino 66'
Penalties
Neves (penalty scored); S. Al-Dawsari (penalty scored); Mitrović (penalty scored); Milinković-Savić (penalty scored)	4–1	(penalty scored) Firmino; (penalty missed) Veiga; (penalty missed) Ibañez

Prince Sultan bin Abdulaziz Sports City, Abha
Attendance: 12,200
Referee: Clément Turpin (France)

14 August 2024
19:15

Al-Taawoun	0–2	Al-Nassr
	Report	Yahya 8'; Ronaldo 57'

Prince Sultan bin Abdulaziz Sports City, Abha
Attendance: 7,213
Referee: Davide Massa (Italy)

=== Final ===
17 August 2024
19:15 AST

Al-Nassr	1–4	Al-Hilal
Ronaldo 44'	Report	Milinković-Savić 55'; Mitrović 63', 69'; Malcom 72'

Prince Sultan bin Abdulaziz Sports City, Abha
Attendance: 14,357
Referee: Artur Soares Dias (Portugal)
