= 2021–22 Damac FC season =

Damac
2021–22 season
- President: Saleh Abu Nekha'a
- Manager: Krešimir Režić
- Stadium: Prince Sultan bin Abdul Aziz Stadium
- SPL: 5th
- King Cup: Round of 16 (knocked out by Al-Shabab)
- Top goalscorer: League: Emilio Zelaya (13 goals); All: Emilio Zelaya (13 goals)
- Highest home attendance: 14,790 (vs. Al-Ittihad, 17 October 2021)
- Lowest home attendance: 453 (vs. Al-Tai, 20 August 2021)
- Average home league attendance: 4,243
- All statistics correct as of 27 June 2022.

The 2021–22 season was Damac's 50th year in their history and third consecutive season in the Pro League. The club participated in the Pro League and the King Cup.

The season covered the period from 1 July 2021 to 30 June 2022.

== Players ==
=== Squad information ===
As of 1 February 2022

Note: Flags indicate national team as defined under FIFA eligibility rules; some limited exceptions apply. Players may hold more than one non-FIFA nationality.

No.	Pos.	Nation	Player
1	GK	KSA	Bandar Al-Shahrani
2	FW	ALG	Hillal Soudani
4	DF	KSA	Ibrahim Al-Nakhli
6	MF	ESP	Nono
7	MF	KSA	Mansor Hamzi
9	FW	KSA	Mazen Abo Shararah
11	MF	KSA	Arif Al Haydar
13	DF	KSA	Abdullah Al-Ammar
14	DF	ARG	Sergio Vittor
15	DF	ALG	Farouk Chafaï (captain)
16	MF	KSA	Bader Munshi
17	MF	CRO	Domagoj Antolić
18	MF	KSA	Muhannad Al-Najei
19	DF	KSA	Abdullah Hawsawi

No.	Pos.	Nation	Player
20	MF	KSA	Mohammed Al-Sahli
21	MF	KSA	Abdulelah Al-Barrih
23	MF	KSA	Abdulaziz Majrashi
24	MF	KSA	Waleed Al-Enezi
25	FW	KSA	Abdulrahman Al-Yami
28	MF	KSA	Fares Al-Shahrani
30	GK	ALG	Moustapha Zeghba
33	GK	KSA	Mohammed Al-Mahasneh
38	MF	KSA	Ammar Al-Najjar
40	DF	KSA	Hassan Al-Shamrani
58	MF	KSA	Abdulaziz Makin
90	FW	ARG	Emilio Zelaya
98	DF	KSA	Khalid Al-Dubaysh
99	FW	KSA	Rayan Al-Qahtani

=== Out on loan ===
Note: Flags indicate national team as defined under FIFA eligibility rules; some limited exceptions apply. Players may hold more than one non-FIFA nationality.

No.	Pos.	Nation	Player
3	DF	KSA	Abdulrahman Al-Rio (at Al-Hazem until 30 June 2022)
8	MF	KSA	Abdulaziz Al-Shahrani (at Ohod until 30 June 2022)
49	FW	KSA	Riyadh Al-Ghamdi (at Al-Kawkab until 30 June 2022)
51	FW	KSA	Ramzi Solan (at Al-Nahda until 30 June 2022)

No.	Pos.	Nation	Player
—	DF	KSA	Aiedh Al-Qahtani (at Bisha until 30 June 2022)
—	DF	KSA	Osama Al-Saleem (at Al-Arabi until 30 June 2022)
—	MF	KSA	Ayman Al-Hujaili (at Al-Ain until 30 June 2022)

== Transfers and loans ==
=== Transfers in ===
Entry date	Position	No.	Player	From club	Fee	Ref.
30 June 2021	DF	40	(Saudi Arabia) Hassan Al-Shamrani	(Saudi Arabia) Al-Tai	End of loan	
30 June 2021	DF	–	(Saudi Arabia) Aiedh Al-Qahtani	(Saudi Arabia) Al-Nojoom	End of loan	
30 June 2021	DF	–	(Saudi Arabia) Nahar Al-Qahtani	(Saudi Arabia) Al-Arabi	End of loan	
30 June 2021	DF	–	(Saudi Arabia) Abdullah Mahjari	(Saudi Arabia) Al-Nojoom	End of loan	
30 June 2021	MF	6	(Saudi Arabia) Abdullah Al-Samti	(Saudi Arabia) Al-Hazem	End of loan	
30 June 2021	MF	21	(Saudi Arabia) Abdulelah Al-Barrih	(Saudi Arabia) Al-Tai	End of loan	
30 June 2021	MF	28	(Saudi Arabia) Saeed Al-Shahrani	(Saudi Arabia) Bisha	End of loan	
30 June 2021	MF	81	(Saudi Arabia) Ibrahim Al-Barakah	(Saudi Arabia) Al-Hazem	End of loan	
30 June 2021	MF	–	(Saudi Arabia) Abdulrahman Al-Khairi	(Saudi Arabia) Najran	End of loan	
30 June 2021	FW	20	(Saudi Arabia) Abdullah Al-Ghamdi	(Saudi Arabia) Al-Hejaz	End of loan	
30 June 2021	FW	22	(Saudi Arabia) Mansour Al-Muwallad	(Saudi Arabia) Al-Adalah	End of loan	
30 June 2021	FW	77	(Saudi Arabia) Abdullah Khattab	(Saudi Arabia) Al-Adalah	End of loan	
1 July 2021	DF	–	(Saudi Arabia) Osama Al-Saleem	(Saudi Arabia) Al-Thoqbah	Free	
1 July 2021	MF	–	(Saudi Arabia) Talal Majrashi	(Saudi Arabia) Al-Fayha	Free	
7 July 2021	DF	19	(Saudi Arabia) Abdullah Hawsawi	(Saudi Arabia) Al-Nojoom	Free	
16 July 2021	FW	49	(Saudi Arabia) Riyadh Al-Ghamdi	(Saudi Arabia) Al-Hilal	Free	
18 July 2021	MF	10	(Croatia) Mijo Caktaš	(Croatia) Hajduk Split	Free	
22 July 2021	FW	2	(Algeria) Hillal Soudani	(Saudi Arabia) Al-Fateh	Free	
19 August 2021	MF	38	(Saudi Arabia) Ammar Al-Najjar	(Saudi Arabia) Al-Shabab	Undisclosed	
27 August 2021	MF	20	(Saudi Arabia) Mohammed Al-Sahli	(Saudi Arabia) Al-Raed	Undisclosed	
31 August 2021	MF	5	(Brazil) Filipe Augusto	(Portugal) Rio Ave	Free	
9 January 2022	FW	25	(Saudi Arabia) Abdulrahman Al-Yami	(Saudi Arabia) Al-Ittihad	Free	
27 January 2022	DF	98	(Saudi Arabia) Khalid Al-Dubaysh	(Saudi Arabia) Al-Shabab	Free	
31 January 2022	MF	6	(Spain) Nono	(Hungary) Honvéd	Free	

=== Transfers out ===
Exit date	Position	No.	Player	To club	Fee	Ref.
30 June 2021	DF	5	(Saudi Arabia) Tareq Abdullah	(Saudi Arabia) Al-Ittihad	End of loan	
30 June 2021	DF	24	(Saudi Arabia) Mohammed Al-Zubaidi	(Saudi Arabia) Al-Ahli	End of loan	
30 June 2021	MF	21	(Saudi Arabia) Mohammed Attiyah	(Saudi Arabia) Al-Shabab	End of loan	
30 June 2021	FW	20	(Saudi Arabia) Abdulaziz Al-Aryani	(Saudi Arabia) Al-Ittihad	End of loan	
12 July 2021	MF	81	(Saudi Arabia) Ibrahim Al-Barakah	(Saudi Arabia) Al-Hazem	Undisclosed	
14 July 2021	MF	75	(Saudi Arabia) Mohammed Harzan	(Saudi Arabia) Al-Tai	Free	
31 July 2021	GK	1	(Saudi Arabia) Khalid Sharahili	(Saudi Arabia) Ohod	Free	
17 August 2021	MF	77	(Norway) Amahl Pellegrino	(Norway) Bodø/Glimt	Free	
26 August 2021	FW	22	(Saudi Arabia) Mansour Al-Muwallad	(Saudi Arabia) Al-Shoulla	Free	
27 August 2021	MF	–	(Saudi Arabia) Talal Majrashi	(Saudi Arabia) Al-Qadsiah	Free	
30 August 2021	DF	–	(Saudi Arabia) Abdullah Mahjari	(Saudi Arabia) Al-Bukiryah	Free	
1 September 2021	GK	–	(Saudi Arabia) Yazan Jari		Released	
1 September 2021	DF	–	(Saudi Arabia) Nahar Al-Qahtani		Released	
1 September 2021	MF	12	(Saudi Arabia) Abdulaziz Asiri		Released	
1 September 2021	MF	–	(Saudi Arabia) Abdulrahman Al-Khairi	(Saudi Arabia) Al-Qala	Free	
1 September 2021	FW	20	(Saudi Arabia) Abdullah Al-Ghamdi	(Saudi Arabia) Al-Shaheed	Free	
7 September 2021	MF	99	(Romania) Constantin Budescu	(Romania) FCSB	Free	
10 September 2021	MF	8	(Saudi Arabia) Mohanad Fallatah	(Saudi Arabia) Al-Adalah	Free	
12 September 2021	GK	26	(Saudi Arabia) Mousa Zolan	(Saudi Arabia) Al-Okhdood	Free	
12 September 2021	MF	6	(Saudi Arabia) Abdullah Al-Samti	(Saudi Arabia) Al-Qadsiah	Free	
17 September 2021	MF	28	(Saudi Arabia) Saeed Al-Shahrani	(Saudi Arabia) Al-Bukiryah	Free	
11 January 2022	MF	10	(Croatia) Mijo Caktaš		Released	
13 January 2022	FW	77	(Saudi Arabia) Abdullah Khattab	(Saudi Arabia) Al-Jabalain	Free	
14 January 2022	MF	5	(Brazil) Filipe Augusto		Released	

=== Loans out ===
Start date	End date	Position	No.	Player	To club	Fee	Ref.
14 August 2021	End of season	FW	49	(Saudi Arabia) Riyadh Al-Ghamdi	(Saudi Arabia) Al-Kawkab	None	
1 September 2021	End of season	DF	–	(Saudi Arabia) Osama Al-Saleem	(Saudi Arabia) Al-Arabi	None	
2 September 2021	End of season	DF	–	(Saudi Arabia) Aiedh Al-Qahtani	(Saudi Arabia) Bisha	None	
3 September 2021	End of season	MF	58	(Saudi Arabia) Ayman Al-Hujaili	(Saudi Arabia) Al-Ain	None	
26 January 2022	End of season	DF	3	(Saudi Arabia) Abdulrahman Al-Rio	(Saudi Arabia) Al-Hazem	None	
27 January 2022	End of season	MF	8	(Saudi Arabia) Abdulaziz Al-Shahrani	(Saudi Arabia) Ohod	None	
31 January 2022	End of season	FW	51	(Saudi Arabia) Ramzi Solan	(Saudi Arabia) Al-Nahda	None	

== Pre-season ==
21 July 2021 Friendly	Damac (Saudi Arabia)	4–0	(Slovenia) NK Domžale	Domžale, Slovenia
CEST				Stadium: Domžale Sports Park

24 July 2021 Friendly	Damac (Saudi Arabia)	9–0	(Slovenia) ND Bilje	Bilje, Slovenia
CEST	Al Haydar; Zelaya; Chafaï; Majrashi; Al-Shahrani, Abu Shararah,,	Report		Stadium: Stadion V dolinci

28 July 2021 Friendly	Damac (Saudi Arabia)	0–0	(Cyprus) AEK Larnaca	Gornja Radgona, Slovenia
17:00 CEST		Report		Stadium: Stadion Gornja Radgona

2 August 2021 Friendly	Damac (Saudi Arabia)	2–1	(Slovenia) NK Aluminij	Kidričevo, Slovenia
18:00 CEST	Abu Shararah 59'; Chafaï 90'		41'	Stadium: Aluminij Sports Park

8 August 2021 Friendly	Damac (Saudi Arabia)	1–1	(Saudi Arabia) Najran	Abha, Saudi Arabia
19:00 AST	Al-Shamrani 88'	Report	54'	Stadium: Prince Sultan bin Abdul Aziz Stadium

== Competitions ==
=== Overview ===
Competition	Record							
Competition	G	W	D	L	GF	GA	GD	Win %
Pro League	30	12	8	10	38	44	−6	40.00
King Cup	1	0	0	1	0	5	−5	0.00
Total	31	12	8	11	38	49	−11	38.71

Updated to match played 27 June 2022
Source: Competitions

=== Pro League ===
==== League table ====
Pos	Team	Pld	W	D	L	GF	GA	GD	Pts
3	Al-Nassr	30	19	4	7	58	36	+22	61
4	Al-Shabab	30	15	10	5	52	36	+16	55
5	Damac	30	12	8	10	38	44	−6	44
6	Al-Tai	30	11	4	15	33	45	−12	37
7	Al-Raed	30	10	6	14	35	45	−10	36

Source: spl.com
Rules for classification: 1) Points; 2) Head-to-head points; 3) Head-to-head goal difference; 4) Total goal difference; 5) Total goals scored; 6) Fair-play points (Note: Head-to-head record is used only after all the matches between the teams in question have been played).

==== Results summary ====
Overall								Home						Away					
Pld	W	D	L	GF	GA	GD	Pts	W	D	L	GF	GA	GD	W	D	L	GF	GA	GD
30	12	8	10	38	44	−6	44	7	5	3	19	18	+1	5	3	7	19	26	−7

Last updated: 27 June 2022.
Source: spl.sa

==== Results by round ====
Round	1	2	3	4	5	6	7	8	9	10	11	12	13	14	15	16	17	18	19	20	21	22	23	24	25	26	27	28	29	30
Ground	A	H	A	H	H	A	A	H	H	A	A	H	A	H	A	H	A	H	A	A	H	H	A	A	H	H	A	H	A	H
Result	L	W	D	W	D	W	W	D	W	W	L	W	D	D	L	L	W	D	L	L	W	W	L	W	W	L	D	L	L	D
Position	16	9	11	6	5	4	2	2	1	1	3	1	3	3	4	5	5	5	5	5	5	5	5	5	5	5	5	5	5	5

Updated to match(es) played on 27 June 2022. Source: spl.com.sa
A = Away; H = Home; W = Win; D = Draw; L = Loss

==== Matches ====
All times are local, AST (UTC+3).

Win Draw Loss Postponed

13 August 2021 1	Al-Nassr	4–1	Damac	Riyadh
19:05	Hamdallah 4' (pen.); Talisca 40'; Al-Najai 42' (o.g.); Petros (yellow card) 44'; Aboubakar 80'	Report	Chafaï (yellow card) 3'; Al-Najai (yellow card) 34'; Zelaya 51' (pen.)	Stadium: Mrsool Park; Attendance: 7,997; Referee: Abdulrahman Al-Jassim (Qatar)

20 August 2021 2	Damac	1–0	Al-Tai	Abha
19:10	Vittor (yellow card) 25'; Caktaš 59'	Report	Marcelo (yellow card) 90+3'	Stadium: Prince Sultan bin Abdul Aziz Stadium; Attendance: 453; Referee: Khaled Salwi

25 August 2021 3	Al-Ahli	1–1	Damac	Jeddah
20:45	Ndao 18'; Al-Mogahwi (yellow card) 59'	Report	Soudani 19'; Munshi (yellow card) 47'; Hawsawi (yellow card) 50'	Stadium: King Abdullah Sports City; Attendance: 17,370; Referee: Majed Al-Shamrani

11 September 2021 4	Damac	2–0	Al-Faisaly	Abha
18:50	Zelaya 10'; Soudani 52'	Report	Al-Kassar (yellow card) 8'; Ismael (yellow card) 90+5'	Stadium: Prince Sultan bin Abdul Aziz Stadium; Attendance: 1,090; Referee: Sultan Al-Harbi

17 September 2021 5	Damac	1–1	Al-Shabab	Abha
18:45	Hawsawi (yellow card) 17' (yellow-red card) 70'; Zelaya 85' (pen.)	Report	Banega 73' (pen.)	Stadium: Prince Sultan bin Abdul Aziz Stadium; Attendance: 5,207; Referee: Mohammed Al-Hoaish

24 September 2021 6	Abha	1–3	Damac	Abha
18:40	Al Hamsal (yellow card) 44' te Vrede 63'; Atouchi (yellow card) 90'	Report	Caktaš 17', 86'; Al-Najjar (yellow card) 45+3'; Munshi (yellow card) 59'; Zelaya 74', (yellow card) 75'; Majrashi (yellow card) 90+1'	Stadium: Prince Sultan bin Abdul Aziz Stadium; Attendance: 3,234; Referee: Majed Al-Shamrani

30 September 2021 7	Al-Raed	0–2	Damac	Buraidah
18:30	René (yellow card) 49'; Al-Dossari (yellow card) 63'	Report	Al-Sahli (yellow card) 24'; Hawsawi (yellow card) 78'; Zelaya 86' (pen.); Augusto 90+5'	Stadium: King Abdullah Sport City Stadium; Attendance: 2,408; Referee: Khaled Al-Teris

17 October 2021 8	Damac	1–1	Al-Ittihad	Abha
18:25	Zelaya 54'; Majrashi (yellow card) 64'; Augusto (yellow card) 83'	Report	Romarinho 23'	Stadium: Prince Sultan bin Abdul Aziz Stadium; Attendance: 14,790; Referee: Turki Al-Khudhayr

22 October 2021 9	Damac	1–0	Al-Hazem	Abha
18:20	Al Haydar (yellow card) 90+2'; Zelaya 90+12'	Report	Al-Dakheel (yellow card) 19'; Neris (yellow card) 66'; Abdullah S. (yellow card) 90+14'	Stadium: Prince Sultan bin Abdul Aziz Stadium; Attendance: 1,802; Referee: Sultan Sughayyir

30 October 2021 10	Al-Ettifaq	0–1	Damac	Khobar
17:40	Kiss (yellow card) 87'	Report	Zeghba (yellow card) 42'; Al-Ammar 68'; Augusto (red card) 85'	Stadium: Prince Saud bin Jalawi Stadium; Attendance: 7,328; Referee: Sultan Al-Harbi

4 November 2021 11	Al-Hilal	2–0	Damac	Riyadh
17:50	Gomis (yellow card) 24'; Jahfali (yellow card) 33'; Carrillo 56'; Al-Bulaihi (yellow card) 80'; Al-Juwayr 90+3'	Report		Stadium: Prince Faisal bin Fahd Stadium; Attendance: 14,944; Referee: Kevin Ortega (Peru)

20 November 2021 12	Damac	1–0	Al-Fayha	Abha
15:30	Majrashi (yellow card) 38'; Vittor (yellow card) 62'; Chafaï 83'	Report	Tachtsidis (red card) 21'; Moutari (yellow card) 46'; Al-Safri (yellow card) 58'; Al-Baqawi (yellow card) 90+5'	Stadium: Prince Sultan bin Abdul Aziz Stadium; Attendance: 1,101; Referee: Faisal Al-Blwi

25 November 2021 13	Al-Fateh	5–5	Damac	Al-Hasa
17:30	Cueva 3', 75' (pen.); Al-Zaqaan 19', (yellow card) 38'; Santini 69'; Al-Buraikan 76'; Lajami (yellow card) 87'	Report	Augusto (yellow card) 6', (goal) 45+4'; Soudani 11', 16'; Vittor (yellow card) 38'; Zelaya (yellow card) 40', (goal) 79'; Caktaš 63'; Zeghba (yellow card) 90+4'	Stadium: Prince Abdullah bin Jalawi Stadium; Attendance: 6,260; Referee: Shukri Al-Hanfoush

25 December 2021 14	Damac	1–1	Al-Batin	Abha
15:40	Chaves 15' (o.g.); Soudani (yellow card) 22'; Caktaš (yellow card) 25'; Augusto (yellow card) 90'	Report	Abreu 88'	Stadium: Prince Sultan bin Abdul Aziz Stadium; Attendance: 825; Referee: Majed Al-Shamrani

1 January 2022 15	Al-Taawoun	3–0	Damac	Buraidah
15:25	Luvannor 18', 65', (yellow card) 50'; Kaku 82'	Report	Chafaï (yellow card) 31'; Al-Rio (yellow card) 57'	Stadium: King Abdullah Sport City Stadium; Attendance: 4,700; Referee: Derlis Fabián López (Paraguay)

8 January 2022 16	Damac	0–2	Al-Nassr	Abha
15:50	Soudani (yellow card) 53'; Augusto (yellow card) 71'; Al-Enezi (yellow card) 90+3'	Report	Al-Hassan (yellow card) 12'; Talisca 19'; Martínez 51'; Al-Khaibari (yellow card) 65'; S. Al-Ghanam (yellow card) 75'; Al-Shammari (yellow card) 80'	Stadium: Prince Sultan bin Abdul Aziz Stadium; Attendance: 6,732; Referee: Fábio Veríssimo (Portugal)

15 January 2022 17	Al-Tai	1–2	Damac	Ha'il
15:40	Dener 8'; Al-Zubaidi (yellow card) 40'; Marcelo (yellow card) 69'	Report	Al-Enezi (yellow card) 38'; Hamzi 42', 80'; Munshi (yellow card) 63'	Stadium: Prince Abdul Aziz bin Musa'ed Stadium; Attendance: 3,519; Referee: Shukri Al-Hanfoush

21 January 2022 18	Damac	1–1	Al-Ahli	Abha
15:55	Soudani 4'; Majrashi (red card) 83'	Report	Al Somah 40' (pen.); Al-Majhad (yellow card) 90+4'	Stadium: Prince Sultan bin Abdul Aziz Stadium; Attendance: 6,937; Referee: Ahmed Al-Rumaikhani

5 February 2022 19	Al-Faisaly	3–0	Damac	Al Majma'ah
18:20	I. Rossi 8'; Qassem (yellow card) 10'; Assiri (yellow card) 11'; Rossi P. 21', (yellow card) 65'; Boyle 29', (yellow card) 66'	Report		Stadium: Al Majma'ah Sports City; Attendance: 3,500; Referee: Sami Al-Jires

10 February 2022 20	Al-Shabab	2–1	Damac	Riyadh
18:20	Vietto 14', (yellow card) 90+2'; Carlos 55'; Al-Sqoor (yellow card) 59'; Al-Shamekh (yellow card) 88'	Report	Zeghba (yellow card) 4'; Al-Ammar (yellow card) 43'; Zelaya 45' (pen.); Al-Yami (yellow card) 79'	Stadium: Prince Faisal bin Fahd Stadium; Attendance: 3,911; Referee: Faisal Al-Blwi

19 February 2022 21	Damac	3–2	Abha	Abha
16:10	Zelaya 30' (pen.); Soudani 51'; Vittor 67'; Al-Shamrani (yellow card) 77'	Report	Matić 15'; Ifa 43'; Bguir (yellow card) 90'	Stadium: Prince Sultan bin Abdul Aziz Stadium; Attendance: 4,735; Referee: Shukri Al-Hanfoush

26 February 2022 22	Damac	3–2	Al-Raed	Abha
16:15	Hamzi 27'; Antolić (red card) 30'; Soudani 39'; Vittor (yellow card) 45+5', (goal) 90+5'; Chafaï (yellow card) 45+6'	Report	Eder 36'; Al-Khathlan (yellow card) 45+5'; El Berkaoui 46'; René (red card) 90+4'	Stadium: Prince Sultan bin Abdul Aziz Stadium; Attendance: 3,263; Referee: Abdullah Al-Awedan

3 March 2022 23	Al-Ittihad	2–1	Damac	Jeddah
19:00	Al-Muwallad 75'; Al-Aboud 79', (red card) 90+10'	Report	Chafaï (yellow card) 47'; Al-Nakhli (yellow card) 54'; Soudani (yellow card) 55'; Hamzi (yellow card) 68'; Zelaya 90+3' (pen.); Abu Shararah (red card) 90+10'; Hawsawi (yellow card) 90+14'	Stadium: King Abdullah Sports City; Attendance: 27,372; Referee: Bastian Dankert (Germany)

12 March 2022 24	Al-Hazem	0–1	Damac	Ar Rass
18:50	Al-Najei (yellow card) 85'; Al-Dakheel (yellow card) 90+1'	Report	Zelaya 30' (pen.); Al-Najjar (yellow card) 54'; Antolić (yellow card) 90+1'	Stadium: Al-Hazem Club Stadium; Attendance: 1,781; Referee: Mohammed Al-Qarni

17 March 2022 25	Damac	1–0	Al-Ettifaq	Abha
18:55	Al-Nakhli (yellow card) 40'; Soudani 41'; Munshi (yellow card) 47'; Nono (yellow card) 55'	Report	Al-Khateeb (yellow card) 38'; Younes (red card) 58'; Al-Rubaie (yellow card) 69'	Stadium: Prince Sultan bin Abdul Aziz Stadium; Attendance: 3,764; Referee: Ahmed Al-Rumaikhani

7 May 2022 26	Damac	2–4	Al-Hilal	Abha
19:10	Zelaya 3' (pen.); Al-Shamrani (yellow card) 30'; Hamzi 40'; Nono (yellow card) 62'	Report	Al-Juwayr 36'; Al-Bulaihi (yellow card) 58'; Pereira 75', (yellow card) 78'; Marega 79'; Ighalo 90+2'	Stadium: Prince Sultan bin Abdul Aziz Stadium; Attendance: 10,612; Referee: Shukri Al-Hanfoush

23 May 2022 27	Al-Fayha	0–0	Damac	Al Majma'ah
19:20	Abousaban (yellow card) 74'	Report	Nono (yellow card) 31'; Al-Najjar (yellow card) 90+4'	Stadium: Al Majma'ah Sports City; Attendance: 6,342; Referee: Abdullah Al-Kharbosh

29 May 2022 28	Damac	0–3	Al-Fateh	Abha
19:15	Zeghba (yellow card) 79'	Report	Al-Buraikan 12', 15', 80' (pen.); Cueva (yellow card) 88'	Stadium: Prince Sultan bin Abdul Aziz Stadium; Attendance: 1,534; Referee: Sami Al-Jires

23 June 2022 29	Al-Batin	2–1	Damac	Hafar al-Batin
21:00	Rayhi 12' (pen.); Al-Shammari 30'	Report	Nono 6', (yellow card) 90+2'	Stadium: Al-Batin Club Stadium; Attendance: 4,221; Referee: Sultan Al-Harbi

27 June 2022 30	Damac	1–1	Al-Taawoun	Abha
21:00	Al-Nakhli (yellow card) 5', (goal) 88'; Munshi (yellow card) 37'	Report	Balobaid (yellow card) 12'; Tawamba 53'	Stadium: Prince Sultan bin Abdul Aziz Stadium; Attendance: 791; Referee: Khaled Al-Teris

=== King Cup ===
All times are local, AST (UTC+3).

19 December 2021 Round of 16	Al-Shabab	5–0	Damac	Riyadh
20:00	Al-Harbi 50'; Al-Qahtani (yellow card) 51'; Carlos 57', 60'; Chafaï 71' (o.g.); Al-Ammar 83'; Al-Abed (red card) 89'	Report	Al-Ammar (yellow card) 53'; Vittor (yellow card) 90'	Stadium: King Fahd International Stadium; Referee: Sultan Al-Harbi

== Statistics ==
=== Appearances ===
Last updated on 27 June 2022.

No.	Pos	Nat	Player	Total		Pro League		King Cup	
No.	Pos	Nat	Player	Apps	Goals	Apps	Goals	Apps	Goals
Goalkeepers
1	GK	(Saudi Arabia) KSA	Bandar Al-Shahrani	0	0	0	0	0	0
30	GK	(Algeria) ALG	Moustapha Zeghba	25	0	25	0	0	0
33	GK	(Saudi Arabia) KSA	Mohammed Al-Mahasneh	6	0	5	0	1	0
Defenders
4	DF	(Saudi Arabia) KSA	Ibrahim Al-Nakhli	27	1	13+13	1	1	0
13	DF	(Saudi Arabia) KSA	Abdullah Al-Ammar	29	1	28	1	1	0
14	DF	(Argentina) ARG	Sergio Vittor	26	2	25	2	1	0
15	DF	(Algeria) ALG	Farouk Chafaï	24	1	23	1	1	0
19	DF	(Saudi Arabia) KSA	Abdullah Hawsawi	18	0	13+5	0	0	0
32	DF	(Saudi Arabia) KSA	Omar Al-Muziel	0	0	0	0	0	0
40	DF	(Saudi Arabia) KSA	Hassan Al-Shamrani	16	0	13+3	0	0	0
98	DF	(Saudi Arabia) KSA	Khalid Al-Dubaysh	3	0	1+2	0	0	0
Midfielders
6	MF	(Spain) ESP	Nono	10	1	10	1	0	0
7	MF	(Saudi Arabia) KSA	Mansor Hamzi	29	4	24+4	4	1	0
11	MF	(Saudi Arabia) KSA	Arif Al Haydar	7	0	2+5	0	0	0
16	MF	(Saudi Arabia) KSA	Bader Munshi	21	0	11+9	0	0+1	0
17	MF	(Croatia) CRO	Domagoj Antolić	12	0	11+1	0	0	0
18	MF	(Saudi Arabia) KSA	Mohanad Al-Najei	2	0	1+1	0	0	0
20	MF	(Saudi Arabia) KSA	Mohammed Al-Sahli	14	0	2+11	0	0+1	0
21	MF	(Saudi Arabia) KSA	Abdulelah Al-Barrih	13	0	5+7	0	0+1	0
23	MF	(Saudi Arabia) KSA	Abdulaziz Majrashi	28	0	23+4	0	1	0
24	MF	(Saudi Arabia) KSA	Waleed Al-Enezi	29	0	10+18	0	0+1	0
28	MF	(Saudi Arabia) KSA	Fares Al-Shahrani	3	0	0+3	0	0	0
38	MF	(Saudi Arabia) KSA	Ammar Al-Najjar	17	0	3+14	0	0	0
58	MF	(Saudi Arabia) KSA	Abdulaziz Makin	3	0	1+2	0	0	0
Forwards
2	FW	(Algeria) ALG	Hillal Soudani	25	8	23+2	8	0	0
9	FW	(Saudi Arabia) KSA	Mazen Abo Shararah	19	0	5+13	0	1	0
25	FW	(Saudi Arabia) KSA	Abdulrahman Al-Yami	7	0	0+7	0	0	0
90	FW	(Argentina) ARG	Emilio Zelaya	28	13	26+1	13	1	0
99	FW	(Saudi Arabia) KSA	Rayan Al-Qahtani	3	0	1+2	0	0	0
Players sent out on loan this season
3	DF	(Saudi Arabia) KSA	Abdulrahman Al-Rio	9	0	2+6	0	0+1	0
8	MF	(Saudi Arabia) KSA	Abdulaziz Al-Shahrani	1	0	0+1	0	0	0
Player who made an appearance this season but have left the club
5	MF	(Brazil) BRA	Filipe Augusto	11	2	8+2	2	1	0
10	MF	(Croatia) CRO	Mijo Caktaš	17	4	16	4	1	0
77	FW	(Saudi Arabia) KSA	Abdullah Khattab	2	0	0+2	0	0	0

=== Goalscorers ===
Rank	No.	Pos	Nat	Name	Pro League	King Cup	Total
1	90	FW	(Argentina)	Emilio Zelaya	13	0	13
2	2	FW	(Algeria)	Hillal Soudani	8	0	8
3	7	MF	(Saudi Arabia)	Mansor Hamzi	4	0	4
3	10	MF	(Croatia)	Mijo Caktaš	4	0	4
5	5	MF	(Brazil)	Filipe Augusto	2	0	2
5	14	DF	(Argentina)	Sergio Vittor	2	0	2
7	4	DF	(Saudi Arabia)	Ibrahim Al-Nakhli	1	0	1
7	6	MF	(Spain)	Nono	1	0	1
7	13	DF	(Saudi Arabia)	Abdullah Al-Ammar	1	0	1
7	15	DF	(Algeria)	Farouk Chafaï	1	0	1
Own goal					1	0	1
Total					38	0	38

Last Updated: 27 June 2022

=== Assists ===
Rank	No.	Pos	Nat	Name	Pro League	King Cup	Total
1	13	DF	(Saudi Arabia)	Abdullah Al-Ammar	7	0	7
2	2	FW	(Algeria)	Hillal Soudani	1	0	1
2	7	MF	(Saudi Arabia)	Mansor Hamzi	1	0	1
2	9	FW	(Saudi Arabia)	Mazen Abo Shararah	1	0	1
2	14	DF	(Argentina)	Sergio Vittor	1	0	1
2	15	DF	(Algeria)	Farouk Chafaï	1	0	1
2	20	MF	(Saudi Arabia)	Mohammed Al-Sahli	1	0	1
2	21	MF	(Saudi Arabia)	Abdulelah Al-Barrih	1	0	1
2	28	MF	(Saudi Arabia)	Fares Al-Shahrani	1	0	1
2	90	FW	(Argentina)	Emilio Zelaya	1	0	1
Total					16	0	16

Last Updated: 27 June 2022

=== Clean sheets ===
Rank	No.	Pos	Nat	Name	Pro League	King Cup	Total
1	30	GK	(Algeria)	Moustapha Zeghba	8	0	8
2	33	GK	(Saudi Arabia)	Mohammed Al-Mahasneh	1	0	1
Total					9	0	9

Last Updated: 23 May 2022
