= 2020–21 Damac FC season =

Damac
2020–21 season
- President: Saleh Abu Nekha'a
- Manager: Noureddine Zekri (until 4 January); Krešimir Režić (from 4 January)
- Stadium: Prince Sultan bin Abdul Aziz Stadium
- Pro League: 11th
- King Cup: Round of 16 (knocked out by Al-Taawoun)
- Top goalscorer: League: Emilio Zelaya (19); All: Emilio Zelaya (20)
Home colours	Away colours	Third colours
- All statistics correct as of 30 May 2021.

The 2020–21 season was Damac's 49th year in their history and second consecutive season in the Pro League. The club participated in the Pro League and the King Cup.

The season covered the period from 22 September 2020 to 30 June 2021.

== Players ==
=== Squad information ===
As of 1 February 2021

Note: Flags indicate national team as defined under FIFA eligibility rules; some limited exceptions apply. Players may hold more than one non-FIFA nationality.

No.	Pos.	Nation	Player
1	GK	KSA	Khalid Sharahili
3	DF	KSA	Abdulrahman Al-Rio
4	DF	KSA	Ibrahim Al-Nakhli
5	DF	KSA	Tareq Abdullah (on loan from Al-Ittihad)
7	MF	KSA	Mansor Hamzi
8	MF	KSA	Mohanad Fallatah
9	FW	KSA	Mazen Abo Shararah
10	MF	KSA	Abdulaziz Al-Shahrani
12	DF	KSA	Abdulaziz Asiri
13	DF	KSA	Abdullah Al-Ammar
14	DF	ARG	Sergio Vittor
15	DF	ALG	Farouk Chafaï (captain)
16	MF	KSA	Bader Munshi
17	MF	CRO	Domagoj Antolić
18	MF	KSA	Muhannad Al-Najei
20	FW	KSA	Abdulaziz Al-Aryani (on loan from Al-Ittihad)

No.	Pos.	Nation	Player
21	MF	KSA	Mohammed Attiyah (on loan from Al-Shabab)
23	MF	KSA	Abdulaziz Majrashi
24	DF	KSA	Mohammed Al-Zubaidi (on loan from Al-Ahli)
25	MF	KSA	Arif Al Haydar
26	GK	KSA	Mousa Zoulan
30	GK	ALG	Moustapha Zeghba
32	DF	KSA	Omar Al-Muziel
33	GK	KSA	Mohammed Al-Mahasneh
34	MF	KSA	Waleed Al-Enezi
51	FW	KSA	Ramzi Solan
58	MF	KSA	Ayman Al-Hujaili
75	MF	KSA	Mohammed Harzan
77	MF	NOR	Amahl Pellegrino
90	FW	ARG	Emilio Zelaya
99	MF	ROU	Constantin Budescu

=== Out on loan ===
Note: Flags indicate national team as defined under FIFA eligibility rules; some limited exceptions apply. Players may hold more than one non-FIFA nationality.

No.	Pos.	Nation	Player
6	MF	KSA	Abdullah Al-Samti (at Al-Hazem until 30 June 2021)
11	MF	KSA	Abdulelah Al-Barrih (at Al-Tai until 30 June 2021)
22	FW	KSA	Mansour Al-Muwallad (at Al-Adalah until 30 June 2021)
20	FW	KSA	Abdullah Al Ghamdi (at Al-Hejaz until 30 June 2021)
28	MF	KSA	Saeed Al-Shahrani (at Bisha until 30 June 2021)
41	DF	KSA	Hassan Al-Shamrani (at Al-Tai until 30 June 2021)

No.	Pos.	Nation	Player
81	MF	KSA	Ibrahim Al-Barakah (at Al-Hazem until 30 June 2021)
87	FW	KSA	Abdullah Khattab (at Al-Adalah until 30 June 2021)
—	DF	KSA	Aiedh Al-Qahtani (at Al-Nojoom until 30 June 2021)
—	DF	KSA	Nahar Al-Qahtani (at Al-Arabi until 30 June 2021)
—	DF	KSA	Abdullah Mahjari (at Al-Nojoom until 30 June 2021)
—	MF	KSA	Abdulrahman Al-Khairi (at Najran until 30 June 2021)

== Transfers and loans ==
=== Transfers in ===
Entry date	Position	No.	Player	From club	Fee	Ref.
22 September 2020	DF	13	(Saudi Arabia) Nahar Al-Qahtani	(Saudi Arabia) Al-Kawkab	End of loan	
22 September 2020	MF	11	(Saudi Arabia) Saeed Hezam	(Saudi Arabia) Ohod	End of loan	
22 September 2020	MF	80	(Sudan) Mohammed Hassan	(Saudi Arabia) Al-Tai	End of loan	
22 September 2020	MF	–	(Saudi Arabia) Ibrahim Al-Barakah	(Saudi Arabia) Al-Bukayriyah	Free	
22 September 2020	MF	–	(Saudi Arabia) Abdulrahman Al-Khairi	(Saudi Arabia) Al-Tasamoh	Free	
25 September 2020	DF	4	(Saudi Arabia) Ibrahim Al-Nakhli	(Saudi Arabia) Al-Thoqbah	Free	
25 September 2020	DF	–	(Saudi Arabia) Ayel Haqawi	(Saudi Arabia) Al-Shoulla	Free	
25 September 2020	MF	–	(Chad) Othman Hassan	(Saudi Arabia) Al-Bukayriyah	Free	
27 September 2020	DF	13	(Saudi Arabia) Abdullah Al-Ammar	(Saudi Arabia) Al-Ittihad	Free	
28 September 2020	DF	3	(Saudi Arabia) Abdulrahman Al-Rio	(Saudi Arabia) Al-Wehda	Undisclosed	
30 September 2020	MF	–	(Saudi Arabia) Abdullah Qaisi	(Saudi Arabia) Abha	Free	
2 October 2020	DF	2	(Argentina) Cristian Lema	(Portugal) Benfica	$2,345,000	
3 October 2020	MF	11	(Saudi Arabia) Abdulelah Al-Barrih	(Saudi Arabia) Al-Nojoom	Undisclosed	
3 October 2020	MF	25	(Saudi Arabia) Arif Al Haydar	(Saudi Arabia) Najran	Undisclosed	
5 October 2020	FW	51	(Saudi Arabia) Ramzi Solan	(Saudi Arabia) Al-Faisaly	Undisclosed	
6 October 2020	DF	32	(Saudi Arabia) Omar Al-Muziel	(Saudi Arabia) Al-Fayha	Undisclosed	
12 October 2020	DF	–	(Saudi Arabia) Abdullah Mahjari	(Saudi Arabia) Al-Kholood	Free	
21 October 2020	MF	8	(Saudi Arabia) Mohanad Fallatah	(Saudi Arabia) Al-Fayha	Undisclosed	
21 October 2020	FW	22	(Saudi Arabia) Mansour Al-Muwallad	(Saudi Arabia) Al-Taawoun	Undisclosed	
23 October 2020	MF	10	(Saudi Arabia) Abdulaziz Al-Shahrani	(Saudi Arabia) Al-Ahli	Undisclosed	
24 October 2020	DF	14	(Argentina) Sergio Vittor	(Saudi Arabia) Racing	Free	
25 October 2020	MF	7	(Saudi Arabia) Mansor Hamzi	(Saudi Arabia) Al-Hazem	Free	
26 October 2020	MF	23	(Saudi Arabia) Abdulaziz Majrashi	(Saudi Arabia) Al-Ettifaq	Free	
18 January 2021	MF	17	(Croatia) Domagoj Antolić	(Poland) Legia Warsaw	Free	
25 January 2021	MF	77	(Norway) Amahl Pellegrino	(Norway) Kristiansund	Undisclosed	
7 February 2021	MF	34	(Saudi Arabia) Waleed Al-Enezi	(Saudi Arabia) Al-Shabab	Free	
7 February 2021	MF	99	(Romania) Constantin Budescu	(Romania) Astra Giurgiu	Undisclosed	
8 February 2021	GK	–	(Saudi Arabia) Yazan Jari	(Saudi Arabia) Al-Hilal	Free	
8 February 2021	MF	16	(Saudi Arabia) Bader Munshi	(Saudi Arabia) Al-Kawkab	Free	

=== Loans in ===
Start date	End date	Position	No.	Player	From club	Fee	Ref.
26 September 2020	End of season	MF	21	(Saudi Arabia) Mohammed Attiyah	(Saudi Arabia) Al-Shabab	None	
27 September 2020	End of season	FW	20	(Saudi Arabia) Abdulaziz Al-Aryani	(Saudi Arabia) Al-Ittihad	None	
14 October 2020	End of season	DF	5	(Saudi Arabia) Tareq Abdullah	(Saudi Arabia) Al-Ittihad	None	
16 October 2020	End of season	DF	24	(Saudi Arabia) Mohammed Al-Zubaidi	(Saudi Arabia) Al-Ahli	None	

=== Transfers out ===
Exit date	Position	No.	Player	To club	Fee	Ref.
22 September 2020	DF	12	(Saudi Arabia) Hassan Raghfawi	(Saudi Arabia) Al-Shabab	End of loan	
22 September 2020	DF	45	(Argentina) Sergio Vittor	(Argentina) Racing	End of loan	
22 September 2020	MF	8	(Saudi Arabia) Sami Al-Najei	(Saudi Arabia) Al-Nassr	End of loan	
22 September 2020	MF	10	(Saudi Arabia) Abdulaziz Al-Shahrani	(Saudi Arabia) Al-Ahli	End of loan	
22 September 2020	MF	17	(Saudi Arabia) Mohammed Al-Shahrani	(Saudi Arabia) Al-Nassr	End of loan	
22 September 2020	MF	27	(Saudi Arabia) Abdullah Al-Jouei	(Saudi Arabia) Al-Taawoun	End of loan	
22 September 2020	FW	29	(Saudi Arabia) Mansour Al-Muwallad	(Saudi Arabia) Al-Taawoun	End of loan	
28 September 2020	MF	50	(Saudi Arabia) Morad Al-Rashidi	(Saudi Arabia) Al-Jabalain	Free	
30 September 2020	DF	96	(Nigeria) Imran Ilyas	(Saudi Arabia) Al-Tai	Free	
12 October 2020	DF	–	(Saudi Arabia) Ayel Haqawi	(Saudi Arabia) Al-Bukayriyah	Free	
12 October 2020	MF	–	(Saudi Arabia) Abdullah Qaisi	(Saudi Arabia) Al-Shoulla	Free	
14 October 2020	MF	–	(Chad) Othman Hassan	(Saudi Arabia) Al-Jabalain	Free	
17 October 2020	DF	33	(Saudi Arabia) Jamaan Al-Dossari	(Saudi Arabia) Al-Khaleej	Free	
28 October 2020	DF	88	(Saudi Arabia) Majed Hazzazi	(Saudi Arabia) Al-Jabalain	Free	
7 February 2021	MF	7	(Saudi Arabia) Abdulwahab Jaafer	(Saudi Arabia) Al-Tai	Free	
18 February 2021	DF	2	(Argentina) Cristian Lema	(Argentina) Newell's Old Boys	Free	

=== Loans out ===
Start date	End date	Position	No.	Player	To club	Fee	Ref.
7 October 2020	End of season	FW	87	(Saudi Arabia) Abdullah Khattab	(Saudi Arabia) Al-Adalah	None	
18 October 2020	End of season	DF	–	(Saudi Arabia) Aiedh Al-Qahtani	(Saudi Arabia) Al-Nojoom	None	
18 October 2020	End of season	DF	–	(Saudi Arabia) Abdullah Mahjari	(Saudi Arabia) Al-Nojoom	None	
21 October 2020	End of season	MF	–	(Saudi Arabia) Abdulrahman Al-Khairi	(Saudi Arabia) Najran	None	
23 October 2020	End of season	MF	28	(Saudi Arabia) Saeed Al-Shahrani	(Saudi Arabia) Bisha	None	
25 October 2020	End of season	DF	41	(Saudi Arabia) Hassan Al-Shamrani	(Saudi Arabia) Al-Tai	None	
25 October 2020	End of season	MF	6	(Saudi Arabia) Abdullah Al-Samti	(Saudi Arabia) Al-Hazem	None	
25 October 2020	End of season	MF	81	(Saudi Arabia) Ibrahim Al-Barakah	(Saudi Arabia) Al-Hazem	None	
27 October 2020	End of season	DF	–	(Saudi Arabia) Nahar Al-Qahtani	(Saudi Arabia) Al-Arabi	None	
28 October 2020	End of season	FW	–	(Saudi Arabia) Abdullah Al-Ghamdi	(Saudi Arabia) Al-Hejaz	None	
31 January 2021	End of season	MF	11	(Saudi Arabia) Abdulelah Al-Barrih	(Saudi Arabia) Al-Tai	None	
7 February 2021	End of season	FW	22	(Saudi Arabia) Mansour Al-Muwallad	(Saudi Arabia) Al-Adalah	None	

== Pre-season ==
5 October 2020 Friendly	Damac (Saudi Arabia)	1–1	(Saudi Arabia) Al-Qadsiah	Khamis Mushait, Saudi Arabia
17:00 AST	Zelaya 29'	Report	Asprilla 38'	Stadium: Damac Club Stadium

7 October 2020 Friendly	Wej (Saudi Arabia)	1–3	(Saudi Arabia) Damac	Jeddah, Saudi Arabia
18:30 AST	Goal	Report	Al-Aryani; Chenihi	Stadium: Al-Ittihad Club Stadium

10 October 2020 Friendly	Al-Ittihad (Saudi Arabia)	3–3	(Saudi Arabia) Damac	Jeddah, Saudi Arabia
AST	Al-Muwallad 26'; Romarinho 62'; Al-Sumairi 83'	Report	Zelaya 19', 53'; Al-Hujaili 47'	Stadium: Al-Ittihad Club Stadium

14 October 2020 Friendly	Damac (Saudi Arabia)	3–1	(Saudi Arabia) Najran	Khamis Mushait, Saudi Arabia
18:00 AST	Zelaya 8'; Al Haidar 85'; Abo Shararah 88'	Report	59'	Stadium: Damac Club Stadium

== Competitions ==
=== Overview ===
Competition	Record							
Competition	G	W	D	L	GF	GA	GD	Win %
Pro League	30	9	9	12	43	48	−5	30.00
King Cup	1	0	0	1	1	2	−1	0.00
Total	31	9	9	13	44	50	−6	29.03

Updated to match played 30 May 2021
Source: Competitions

=== Pro League ===
==== League table ====
Pos	Team	Pld	W	D	L	GF	GA	GD	Pts	Qualification or relegation
9	Al-Faisaly	30	9	9	12	42	47	−5	36 (Note: Positions determined by head-to-head points: Al-Faisaly: 16 pts; Al-Raed: 15 pts; Damac: 13 pts; Al-Batin: 12 pts; Abha: 3 pts.)	Qualification for the Champions League group stage (Note: Al-Faisaly qualified for the Champions League group stage as 2020–21 King Cup winners.)
10	Al-Raed	30	10	6	14	44	47	−3	36	
11	Damac	30	9	9	12	43	48	−5	36	
12	Al-Batin	30	9	9	12	43	55	−12	36	
13	Abha	30	10	6	14	42	50	−8	36	

Source: spl.com source=إحصائيات رابطة دوري المحترفين السعودي 2020-2021
Rules for classification: 1) Points; 2) Head-to-head points; 3) Head-to-head goal difference; 4) Total goal difference; 5) Total goals scored; 6) Fair-play points (Note: Head-to-head record is used only after all the matches between the teams in question have been played).

==== Results summary ====
Overall								Home						Away					
Pld	W	D	L	GF	GA	GD	Pts	W	D	L	GF	GA	GD	W	D	L	GF	GA	GD
30	9	9	12	43	48	−5	36	6	5	4	22	19	+3	3	4	8	21	29	−8

Last updated: 30 May 2021.
Source: spl.com.sa

==== Results by round ====
Round	1	2	3	4	5	6	7	8	9	10	11	12	13	14	15	16	17	18	19	20	21	22	23	24	25	26	27	28	29	30
Ground	H	A	A	H	H	A	H	A	H	A	H	A	H	H	A	A	H	H	A	A	H	A	H	A	H	A	H	A	A	H
Result	L	L	L	D	L	L	W	L	W	D	L	L	D	W	L	L	D	W	L	D	L	W	D	W	W	D	D	D	W	W
Position	10	13	15	15	16	16	16	16	16	16	16	16	16	15	15	15	15	15	15	15	15	15	15	15	14	14	15	15	13	11

Updated to match(es) played on 30 May 2021. Source: spl.com.sa
A = Away; H = Home; W = Win; D = Draw; L = Loss

==== Matches ====
All times are local, AST (UTC+3).

Win Draw Loss Postponed

18 October 2020 1	Damac	2–3	Al-Raed	Abha
18:20	Zelaya 45+3' (pen.), 84' (pen.); Lema (red card) 61'	Report	Al-Mogren 1'; Al-Sahli 22', 32'; Al-Fahad (yellow card) 26'; Balghaith (yellow card) 45+3'; Djoum (yellow card) 77'; Al-Rehaili (yellow card) 90+3'	Stadium: Prince Sultan bin Abdul Aziz Stadium; Attendance: 0 Referee: Shukri Al-Hanfoush

23 October 2020 2	Al-Qadsiah	2–1	Damac	Khobar
17:40	Williams (yellow card) 52', (goal) 66'; Abo Shararah (yellow card) 56'; Asprilla 78' (pen.); Stanley (red card) 90+4'	Report	Al-Rio (yellow card) 65'; Chenihi 69'; Chafaï (yellow card) 77'; Al-Ammar (yellow card) 82'	Stadium: Prince Saud bin Jalawi Stadium; Attendance: 0 Referee: Faisal Al-Blwi

31 October 2020 3	Al-Hilal	2–0	Damac	Riyadh
17:50	Gomis 17', 60'; Giovinco (yellow card) 37'; Jahfali (yellow card) 87'; Bahebri (yellow card) 90+4'	Report	Vittor (yellow card) 14'; Harzan (yellow card) 24'; Lema (yellow card) 67'; Chenihi (red card) 80'	Stadium: Prince Faisal bin Fahd Stadium; Attendance: 0 Referee: Turki Al-Khudhayr

6 November 2020 4	Damac	0–0	Al-Faisaly	Abha
15:35	Chafaï (yellow card) 57'	Report	Merkel (yellow card) 16'; Al-Nukhylan (yellow card) 22'; Al-Ahmed (yellow card) 58'; Rossi (yellow card) 66'; Al-Sebyani (yellow card) 81'	Stadium: Prince Sultan bin Abdul Aziz Stadium; Attendance: 0 Referee: Sultan Al-Harbi

23 November 2020 5	Damac	0–2	Al-Ain	Abha
15:30	Vittor (yellow card) 36'	Report	Al-Jamaan 11'; Bukhari (yellow card) 64'; Taïder 90+4' (pen.)	Stadium: Prince Sultan bin Abdul Aziz Stadium; Attendance: 0 Referee: Ahmad Al-Rumaikhani

27 November 2020 6	Al-Shabab	2–1	Damac	Riyadh
17:40	Al-Abed 41', (yellow card) 43'; Al-Shamekh (yellow card) 45+4'; Al-Ammar 80'	Report	Harzan (yellow card) 7'; Chenihi 33'; Chafaï (yellow card) 42'	Stadium: Prince Khalid bin Sultan Stadium; Attendance: 0 Referee: Raed Al-Zahrani

5 December 2020 7	Damac	4–3	Al-Ahli	Abha
15:30	Majrashi (yellow card) 4'; Zelaya 25' (pen.), 75'; Al-Zubaidi (yellow card) 61'; Saidani (yellow card) 71'; Chafaï 76'; Abo Shararah 90+2'	Report	Owusu 12', 18'; Fejsa 35'; Fettouhi (yellow card) 39'; Al Somah (yellow card) 56'	Stadium: Prince Sultan bin Abdul Aziz Stadium; Attendance: 0 Referee: Abdullah Al-Harbi

12 December 2020 8	Al-Ettifaq	4–2	Damac	Dammam
17:25	Sliti 37', 39'; Al-Kwikbi 79'; H. Al-Ghamdi 85'	Report	Zelaya 45+1' (pen.), 90+4'; Abdullah (yellow card) 90'	Stadium: Prince Mohamed bin Fahd Stadium; Attendance: 0 Referee: Khaled Salwi

22 December 2020 9	Damac	2–1	Abha	Abha
15:40	Vittor 37', (yellow card) 90+3'; Saidani (yellow card) 85'; Abo Shararah 90+4', (yellow card) 90+7'	Report	Aouadhi 9'; Atouchi (yellow card) 11'; Amr (yellow card) 34'	Stadium: Prince Sultan bin Abdul Aziz Stadium; Attendance: 0 Referee: Khaled Al-Teris

26 December 2020 10	Al-Nassr	2–2	Damac	Riyadh
17:50	Petros 10', 45+3'; Madu (yellow card) 19'; Al-Hassan (yellow card) 73'	Report	Fallatah (yellow card) 17'; Vittor 36'; Maicon 48' (o.g.); Sharahili (yellow card) 50'; Zelaya (yellow card) 79'	Stadium: Mrsool Park; Attendance: 0 Referee: Abdullah Al-Harbi

1 January 2021 11	Damac	1–2	Al-Fateh	Abha
15:45	Saidani (yellow card) 40'; Vittor (yellow card) 50'; Hamzi 54', (yellow card) 64'	Report	Batna 25' (pen.); Al-Saeed (yellow card) 45+4' te Vrede 48', (yellow card) 60'; Boushal (yellow card) 78'; Al-Nashmi (yellow card) 90+1'	Stadium: Prince Sultan bin Abdul Aziz Stadium; Attendance: 0 Referee: Turki Al-Khudhayr

9 January 2021 12	Al-Ittihad	1–0	Damac	Mecca
19:55	Al-Sahafi (yellow card) 16'; Al-Aboud 36'; El Ahmadi (yellow card) 46'; Al-Muwallad (yellow card) 56'; Al-Swat (yellow card) 90+11'	Report	Saidani (yellow card) 63'; Lema (yellow card) 88'	Stadium: King Abdul Aziz Stadium; Attendance: 0 Referee: Sami Al-Jires

15 January 2021 13	Damac	0–0	Al-Wehda	Abha
15:55	Lema (yellow card) 19'; Abdullah (yellow card) 54'; Abo Shararah (yellow card) 57'; Al-Zubaidi (yellow card) 82'	Report	Kariri (red card) 45+4'; Botía (yellow card) 61'; Anselmo (yellow card) 76'	Stadium: Prince Sultan bin Abdul Aziz Stadium; Attendance: 0 Referee: Abdullah Al-Harbi

20 January 2021 14	Damac	2–0	Al-Batin	Abha
15:55	Zelaya 45+6' (pen.), 68' (pen.); Al-Nakhli (yellow card) 59' (yellow-red card) 79'	Report	Raghfawi (yellow card) 14' (yellow-red card) 20'; Al-Shammeri (yellow card) 39'; El Jebli (yellow card) 60'; Chaves (yellow card) 84'	Stadium: Prince Sultan bin Abdul Aziz Stadium; Attendance: 0 Referee: Mohammed Al-Hoaish

25 January 2021 15	Al-Taawoun	3–1	Damac	Buraidah
15:40	Tawamba 6', 47', 87'; Al-Nabit (yellow card) 54'; Kadesh (yellow card) 60'	Report	Antolić 9' (pen.); Abdullah (yellow card) 21'; Majrashi (red card) 67'	Stadium: King Abdullah Sport City Stadium; Attendance: 0 Referee: Majed Al-Shamrani

31 January 2021 16	Al-Raed	4–2	Damac	Buraidah
15:45	El Berkaoui 32', 58', 62', 90+3'; Baalghyth (yellow card) 45+4'; Fernández (yellow card) 79'; Al-Zain (yellow card) 90+4'	Report	Zelaya 1', (yellow card) 45+2'; Vittor (yellow card) 43' (yellow-red card) 45+2'; Lema (yellow card) 68'; Antolić 78' (pen.); Abdullah (yellow card) 90'	Stadium: King Abdullah Sport City Stadium; Attendance: 0 Referee: Mohammed Al-Smail

6 February 2021 17	Damac	2–2	Al-Qadsiah	Abha
16:00	Hamzi 35'; Abo Shararah (yellow card) 81'; Zelaya 88'	Report	Al-Amri 42'; Al-Dawsari (yellow card) 56' (yellow-red card) 90+4'; Al-Shangeati 86'	Stadium: Prince Sultan bin Abdul Aziz Stadium; Attendance: 0 Referee: Mohammed Al-Qarni

14 February 2021 18	Damac	1–0	Al-Hilal	Abha
16:05	Zelaya (yellow card) 12'; Chafaï 45'; Al-Najej (yellow card) 75'; Majrashi (yellow card) 90'; Zeghba (yellow card) 90+8'	Report	N. Al-Dawsari (yellow card) 90'	Stadium: Prince Sultan bin Abdul Aziz Stadium; Attendance: 0 Referee: Khaled Al-Teris

18 February 2021 19	Al-Faisaly	2–0	Damac	Al Majma'ah
15:50	Amalfitano 12'; Al-Hassan (yellow card) 25'; Tavares 28'	Report	Harzan (yellow card) 66'; Vittor (yellow card) 77'; Munshi (yellow card) 81'	Stadium: Al Majma'ah Sports City; Attendance: 0 Referee: Mohammed Al-Beredi

23 February 2021 20	Al-Ain	1–1	Damac	Al Bahah
16:10	Kabi (yellow card) 8'; Bastos (yellow card) 45+2'; Al-Harbi 46'	Report	Al-Najej (yellow card) 49'; Majrashi (yellow card) 73'; Hamzi 77'	Stadium: King Saud Sport City Stadium; Attendance: 0 Referee: Mohammed Al-Hoaish

1 March 2021 21	Damac	1–2	Al-Shabab	Abha
16:05	Zelaya 20'	Report	Ighalo 12', 39'; Al-Qahtani (yellow card) 14'; Martins (yellow card) 72'; Al-Bawardi (yellow card) 85'; Lichnovsky (red card) 90'	Stadium: Prince Sultan bin Abdul Aziz Stadium; Attendance: 0 Referee: Turki Al-Khudhayr

6 March 2021 22	Al-Ahli	1–3	Damac	Mecca
20:35	Ghareeb 13'; Al-Khabrani (yellow card) 90+5'	Report	Al-Ammar (yellow card) 13'; Hamzi 55', (yellow card) 86'; Zelaya 60' (pen.), 67', (yellow card) 76'; Al Haydar (yellow card) 81'	Stadium: King Abdul Aziz Stadium; Attendance: 0 Referee: Faisal Al-Blwi

11 March 2021 23	Damac	1–1	Al-Ettifaq	Abha
16:10	Chafaï 8'; Munshi (yellow card) 45+3'; Al-Rio (yellow card) 85'	Report	Al Salem 46'; Ghazi (yellow card) 53'; Mets (yellow card) 90'	Stadium: Prince Sultan bin Abdul Aziz Stadium; Attendance: 0 Referee: Sultan Al-Harbi

21 March 2021 24	Abha	3–4	Damac	Abha
16:05	Aouadhi 34', (yellow card) 81'; Meadi (yellow card) 62' (yellow-red card) 90+1'; Bguir 75', 85' (pen.), (yellow card) 90+1'	Report	Chafaï 10', 42', 90+2'; Al Haydar (yellow card) 45+3'; Al-Ammar 78'; Zeghba (yellow card) 84'; Al-Najej (yellow card) 90+3'	Stadium: Prince Sultan bin Abdul Aziz Stadium; Attendance: 0 Referee: Mohammed Al-Hoaish

9 April 2021 25	Damac	3–2	Al-Nassr	Abha
19:05	Pellegrino 7', 62'; Zelaya 56'; Munshi (yellow card) 70' (yellow-red card) 76'	Report	Asiri 51'; Al-Obaid 54', (yellow card) 62'; Maran (yellow card) 90'	Stadium: Prince Sultan bin Abdul Aziz Stadium; Attendance: 0 Referee: Abdullah Al-Harbi

17 April 2021 26	Al-Fateh	1–1	Damac	Al-Hasa
21:35	Boushal (yellow card) 20'; Bendebka 43'; Soudani (yellow card) 69'	Report	Al-Najej (yellow card) 6'; Zelaya 65' (pen.); Al-Rio (yellow card) 83'; Chafaï (yellow card) 90+4'	Stadium: Prince Abdullah bin Jalawi Stadium; Attendance: 0 Referee: Mohammed Al-Beredi

15 May 2021 27	Damac	1–1	Al-Ittihad	Abha
21:00	Zelaya 8'; Al Haydar (yellow card) 64'	Report	El Ahmadi (yellow card) 44'; Al-Yami (yellow card) 78'; Rodrigues 84'; Al Mansor (yellow card) 89'	Stadium: Prince Sultan bin Abdul Aziz Stadium; Attendance: 0 Referee: Mohammed Al-Qarni

20 May 2021 28	Al-Wehda	1–1	Damac	Mecca
19:30	Anselmo (yellow card) 44'; Hernâni 47'; Pedrão (yellow card) 54'; Al-Owaishir (yellow card) 63'	Report	Antolić 45' (pen.), (yellow card) 49'; Munshi (yellow card) 59'; Chafaï (yellow card) 90+1'	Stadium: King Abdul Aziz Stadium; Attendance: 603; Referee: Faisal Al-Blwi

26 May 2021 29	Al-Batin	0–2	Damac	Hafar al-Batin
21:00	Sami (yellow card) 53'; Al Khairi (red card) 90+1'	Report	Vittor (yellow card) 56'; Zelaya 73'; Antolić (yellow card) 80'; Al-Ammar 84'	Stadium: Al-Batin Club Stadium; Attendance: 968; Referee: Turki Al-Khudhayr

30 May 2021 30	Damac	2–0	Al-Taawoun	Abha
21:00	Al-Nakhli (yellow card) 39'; Zelaya 41' (pen.), 52' (pen.), (yellow card) 85'; Antolić (yellow card) 73'; Munshi (yellow card) 82'; Vittor (yellow card) 84'	Report	Al-Sobhi (yellow card) 50'; Al-Nemer (yellow card) 90+4'	Stadium: Prince Sultan bin Abdul Aziz Stadium; Attendance: 2,241; Referee: Sultan Al-Harbi

=== King Cup ===
All times are local, AST (UTC+3).

16 December 2020 Round of 16	Damac	1–2	Al-Taawoun	Abha
15:35	Fallatah (yellow card) 39'; Abdullah (yellow card) 68'; Abo Shararah (yellow card) 88'; Zelaya 90+1'	Report	Amissi 2'; Barnawi (yellow card) 13' (yellow-red card) 45'; Duke (yellow card) 64'; Kadesh (yellow card) 68'; Tawamba 76'; Abousaban (yellow card) 90'	Stadium: Prince Sultan bin Abdul Aziz Stadium; Attendance: 0 Referee: Majed Al-Shamrani

== Statistics ==
=== Appearances ===
Last updated on 30 May 2021.

No.	Pos	Nat	Player	Total		Pro League		King Cup	
No.	Pos	Nat	Player	Apps	Goals	Apps	Goals	Apps	Goals
Goalkeepers
1	GK	(Saudi Arabia) KSA	Khalid Sharahili	9	0	8	0	1	0
26	GK	(Saudi Arabia) KSA	Mousa Zolan	0	0	0	0	0	0
30	GK	(Algeria) ALG	Moustapha Zeghba	22	0	22	0	0	0
33	GK	(Saudi Arabia) KSA	Mohammed Al-Mahasneh	0	0	0	0	0	0
Defenders
3	DF	(Saudi Arabia) KSA	Abdulrahman Al-Rio	14	0	2+12	0	0	0
4	DF	(Saudi Arabia) KSA	Ibrahim Al-Nakhli	15	0	9+5	0	1	0
5	DF	(Saudi Arabia) KSA	Tareq Abdullah	24	0	21+2	0	1	0
12	DF	(Saudi Arabia) KSA	Abdulaziz Asiri	1	0	1	0	0	0
13	DF	(Saudi Arabia) KSA	Abdullah Al-Ammar	24	2	18+6	2	0	0
14	DF	(Argentina) ARG	Sergio Vittor	27	2	26	2	1	0
15	DF	(Algeria) ALG	Farouk Chafaï	30	6	29	6	0+1	0
24	DF	(Saudi Arabia) KSA	Mohammed Al-Zubaidi	14	0	10+3	0	1	0
Midfielders
7	MF	(Saudi Arabia) KSA	Mansor Hamzi	29	4	17+11	4	1	0
8	MF	(Saudi Arabia) KSA	Mohanad Fallatah	5	0	2+2	0	1	0
10	MF	(Saudi Arabia) KSA	Abdulaziz Al-Shahrani	7	0	1+5	0	1	0
16	MF	(Saudi Arabia) KSA	Bader Munshi	13	0	9+4	0	0	0
17	MF	(Croatia) CRO	Domagoj Antolić	17	3	16+1	3	0	0
18	MF	(Saudi Arabia) KSA	Muhannad Al-Najei	18	0	11+7	0	0	0
21	MF	(Saudi Arabia) KSA	Mohammed Attiyah	14	0	5+9	0	0	0
23	MF	(Saudi Arabia) KSA	Abdulaziz Majrashi	19	0	9+10	0	0	0
25	MF	(Saudi Arabia) KSA	Arif Al Haydar	18	0	9+8	0	1	0
34	MF	(Saudi Arabia) KSA	Waleed Al-Enezi	8	0	5+3	0	0	0
58	MF	(Saudi Arabia) KSA	Ayman Al-Hujaili	11	0	3+7	0	0+1	0
75	MF	(Saudi Arabia) KSA	Mohammed Harzan	22	0	13+9	0	0	0
77	MF	(Norway) NOR	Amahl Pellegrino	12	2	7+5	2	0	0
99	MF	(Romania) ROU	Constantin Budescu	12	0	10+2	0	0	0
Forwards
9	FW	(Saudi Arabia) KSA	Mazen Abo Shararah	15	2	6+8	2	0+1	0
20	FW	(Saudi Arabia) KSA	Abdulaziz Al-Aryani	0	0	0	0	0	0
51	FW	(Saudi Arabia) KSA	Ramzi Solan	4	0	0+4	0	0	0
90	FW	(Argentina) ARG	Emilio Zelaya	29	20	28	19	0+1	1
Players sent out on loan this season
6	MF	(Saudi Arabia) KSA	Abdullah Al-Samti	1	0	1	0	0	0
11	MF	(Saudi Arabia) KSA	Abdulelah Al-Barrih	3	0	0+2	0	0+1	0
22	FW	(Saudi Arabia) KSA	Mansour Al-Muwallad	3	0	0+2	0	1	0
Player who made an appearance this season but have left the club
2	DF	(Argentina) ARG	Cristian Lema	11	0	11	0	0	0
35	MF	(Algeria) ALG	Ibrahim Chenihi	9	2	9	2	0	0
36	MF	(Tunisia) TUN	Bilel Saidani	14	0	12+1	0	1	0

=== Goalscorers ===
Rank	No.	Pos	Nat	Name	Pro League	King Cup	Total
1	90	FW	(Argentina)	Emilio Zelaya	19	1	20
2	15	DF	(Algeria)	Farouk Chafaï	6	0	6
3	7	MF	(Saudi Arabia)	Mansor Hamzi	4	0	4
4	17	MF	(Croatia)	Domagoj Antolić	3	0	3
5	9	FW	(Saudi Arabia)	Mazen Abo Shararah	2	0	2
5	13	DF	(Saudi Arabia)	Abdullah Al-Ammar	2	0	2
5	14	DF	(Argentina)	Sergio Vittor	2	0	2
5	35	MF	(Algeria)	Ibrahim Chenihi	2	0	2
5	77	MF	(Norway)	Amahl Pellegrino	2	0	2
Own goal					1	0	0
Total					43	1	44

Last Updated: 30 May 2021

=== Assists ===
Rank	No.	Pos	Nat	Name	Pro League	King Cup	Total
1	17	MF	(Croatia)	Domagoj Antolić	6	0	6
2	99	MF	(Romania)	Constantin Budescu	4	0	4
3	36	MF	(Tunisia)	Bilel Saidani	3	0	3
4	7	MF	(Saudi Arabia)	Mansor Hamzi	2	0	2
4	13	DF	(Saudi Arabia)	Abdullah Al-Ammar	2	0	2
4	25	MF	(Saudi Arabia)	Arif Al Haydar	2	0	2
4	75	MF	(Saudi Arabia)	Mohammed Harzan	2	0	2
8	5	DF	(Saudi Arabia)	Tareq Abdullah	0	1	1
8	9	FW	(Saudi Arabia)	Mazen Abo Shararah	1	0	1
8	10	MF	(Saudi Arabia)	Abdulaziz Al-Shahrani	1	0	1
8	24	DF	(Saudi Arabia)	Mohammed Al-Zubaidi	1	0	1
8	90	FW	(Argentina)	Emilio Zelaya	1	0	1
Total					25	1	26

Last Updated: 26 May 2021

=== Clean sheets ===
Rank	No.	Pos	Nat	Name	Pro League	King Cup	Total
1	30	GK	(Algeria)	Moustapha Zeghba	4	0	4
2	1	GK	(Saudi Arabia)	Khalid Sharahili	2	0	2
Total					6	0	6

Last Updated: 30 May 2021
