= 2022–23 Damac FC season =

Damac
2022–23 season
- President: Saleh Abu Nekha'a (until 29 August); Khaled Al Masha'at (from 29 August)
- Manager: Krešimir Režić (until 6 March); Cosmin Contra (from 6 March)
- Stadium: Prince Sultan bin Abdul Aziz Stadium; Damac Club Stadium
- SPL: 8th
- King Cup: Round of 16 (knocked out by Al-Wehda)
- Top goalscorer: League: Hillal Soudani (6); All: Hillal Soudani (6)
- Highest home attendance: 13,434 (vs. Al-Nassr, 25 February 2023)
- Lowest home attendance: 311 (vs. Al-Ettifaq, 15 December 2022)
- Average home league attendance: 4,139

The 2022–23 season was Damac's 51st year in their history and fourth consecutive season in the Pro League. The club participated in the Pro League and the King Cup.

The season covered the period from 1 July 2022 to 30 June 2023.

== Players ==
=== Squad information ===
As of 1 February 2023

Note: Flags indicate national team as defined under FIFA eligibility rules; some limited exceptions apply. Players may hold more than one non-FIFA nationality.

No.	Pos.	Nation	Player
1	GK	KSA	Bandar Al-Shahrani
2	FW	ALG	Hillal Soudani
3	DF	ALG	Abdelkader Bedrane
4	DF	KSA	Ibrahim Al-Nakhli
6	MF	NED	Adam Maher
7	MF	KSA	Mansor Hamzi
8	MF	KSA	Ryan Al-Mousa
9	FW	BRA	Bruno Duarte
10	MF	ESP	Nono
11	MF	KSA	Abdulelah Al-Shammeri (on loan from Al-Shabab)
12	MF	KSA	Abdulaziz Makin
13	DF	KSA	Abdullah Al-Ammar
14	MF	KSA	Abdulaziz Al-Shahrani
15	DF	ALG	Farouk Chafaï (captain)
16	MF	KSA	Bader Munshi

No.	Pos.	Nation	Player
17	MF	CRO	Domagoj Antolić
18	MF	KSA	Muhannad Al-Najei
19	DF	KSA	Abdullah Hawsawi
20	DF	KSA	Dhari Al-Anazi
22	GK	KSA	Abdulbassit Hawsawi
23	MF	KSA	Abdulaziz Majrashi
24	MF	KSA	Waleed Al-Enezi
30	GK	ALG	Moustapha Zeghba
32	DF	KSA	Abdullah Hassoun
33	GK	KSA	Mohammed Al-Mahasneh
38	MF	KSA	Ammar Al-Najjar
40	DF	KSA	Hassan Al-Shamrani
79	MF	KSA	Fares Al-Shahrani
99	FW	KSA	Rayan Al-Qahtani

=== Out on loan ===
Note: Flags indicate national team as defined under FIFA eligibility rules; some limited exceptions apply. Players may hold more than one non-FIFA nationality.

No.	Pos.	Nation	Player
49	MF	KSA	Ahmed Al-Zain (at Al-Khaleej until 30 June 2023)
51	FW	KSA	Ramzi Solan (at Najran until 30 June 2023)

No.	Pos.	Nation	Player
—	DF	KSA	Omar Al-Muziel (at Al-Shoulla until 30 June 2023)

== Transfers and loans ==
=== Transfers in ===
Entry date	Position	No.	Player	From club	Fee	Ref.
30 June 2022	DF	–	(Saudi Arabia) Aiedh Al-Qahtani	(Saudi Arabia) Bisha	End of loan	
30 June 2022	DF	–	(Saudi Arabia) Abdulrahman Al-Rio	(Saudi Arabia) Al-Hazem	End of loan	
30 June 2022	DF	–	(Saudi Arabia) Osama Al-Saleem	(Saudi Arabia) Al-Arabi	End of loan	
30 June 2022	MF	–	(Saudi Arabia) Ayman Al-Hujaili	(Saudi Arabia) Al-Ain	End of loan	
30 June 2022	MF	–	(Saudi Arabia) Abdulaziz Al-Shahrani	(Saudi Arabia) Ohod	End of loan	
30 June 2022	FW	–	(Saudi Arabia) Riyadh Al-Ghamdi	(Saudi Arabia) Al-Kawkab	End of loan	
30 June 2022	FW	–	(Saudi Arabia) Ramzi Solan	(Saudi Arabia) Al-Nahda	End of loan	
1 July 2022	GK	22	(Saudi Arabia) Abdulbassit Hawsawi	(Saudi Arabia) Al-Raed	Free	
1 July 2022	DF	3	(Algeria) Abdelkader Bedrane	(Tunisia) ES Tunis	Free	
1 July 2022	MF	49	(Saudi Arabia) Ahmed Al-Zain	(Saudi Arabia) Al-Raed	Free	
11 July 2022	MF	6	(Netherlands) Adam Maher	(Netherlands) FC Utrecht	$1,850,000	
16 July 2022	DF	32	(Saudi Arabia) Abdullah Hassoun	(Saudi Arabia) Al-Ahli	Undisclosed	
20 July 2022	DF	20	(Saudi Arabia) Dhari Al-Anazi	(Saudi Arabia) Al-Nassr	Undisclosed	
22 July 2022	MF	8	(Saudi Arabia) Ryan Al-Mousa	(Saudi Arabia) Al-Taawoun	Undisclosed	
22 July 2022	FW	9	(Brazil) Bruno Duarte	(Portugal) Vitória Guimarães	$615,000	

=== Loans in ===
Start date	End date	Position	No.	Player	From club	Fee	Ref.
4 August 2022	End of season	MF	11	(Saudi Arabia) Abdulelah Al-Shammeri	(Saudi Arabia) Al-Shabab	None	

=== Transfers out ===
Exit date	Position	No.	Player	To club	Fee	Ref.
1 July 2022	DF	14	(Argentina) Sergio Vittor	(Qatar) Al-Sailiya	Free	
13 July 2022	MF	–	(Saudi Arabia) Ayman Al-Hujaili	(Saudi Arabia) Al-Khaleej	Free	
17 July 2022	FW	90	(Argentina) Emilio Zelaya	(Cyprus) Karmiotissa	Free	
23 July 2022	MF	20	(Saudi Arabia) Mohammed Al-Sahli	(Saudi Arabia) Al-Khaleej	Undisclosed	
24 July 2022	DF	–	(Saudi Arabia) Osama Al-Saleem	(Saudi Arabia) Al-Nahda	Free	
24 July 2022	MF	11	(Saudi Arabia) Arif Al Haydar	(Saudi Arabia) Al-Adalah	Undisclosed	
18 August 2022	MF	21	(Saudi Arabia) Abdulelah Al-Barrih	(Saudi Arabia) Al-Batin	Undisclosed	
21 August 2022	MF	–	(Saudi Arabia) Abdulaziz Asiri	(Saudi Arabia) Al-Ain	Free	
31 August 2022	FW	9	(Saudi Arabia) Mazen Abu Shararah	(Saudi Arabia) Al-Qadsiah	Free	
5 September 2022	DF	98	(Saudi Arabia) Khalid Al-Dubaysh	(Saudi Arabia) Al-Ain	Free	
8 September 2022	DF	–	(Saudi Arabia) Aiedh Al-Qahtani	(Saudi Arabia) Jerash	Free	
8 September 2022	FW	25	(Saudi Arabia) Abdulrahman Al-Yami	(Saudi Arabia) Al-Riyadh	Free	
8 September 2022	FW	49	(Saudi Arabia) Riyadh Al-Ghamdi	(Saudi Arabia) Al-Diriyah	Free	
9 September 2022	DF	–	(Saudi Arabia) Abdulrahman Al-Rio	(Saudi Arabia) Al-Faisaly	Free	
29 January 2023	GK	–	(Saudi Arabia) Yazan Jari	(Saudi Arabia) Al-Batin	Free	

=== Loans out ===
Start date	End date	Position	No.	Player	To club	Fee	Ref.
20 August 2022	1 January 2023	MF	28	(Saudi Arabia) Fares Al-Shahrani	(Saudi Arabia) Al-Ain	None	
8 September 2022	End of season	FW	51	(Saudi Arabia) Ramzi Solan	(Saudi Arabia) Najran	None	
9 September 2022	End of season	DF	32	(Saudi Arabia) Omar Al-Muziel	(Saudi Arabia) Al-Shoulla	None	
27 January 2023	End of season	MF	49	(Saudi Arabia) Ahmed Al-Zain	(Saudi Arabia) Al-Khaleej	None	

== Pre-season ==
26 July 2022 Friendly	Damac (Saudi Arabia)	6–2	(Greece) Apollon Larissa	Zreče, Slovenia
16:00 CEST	Nono 15'; Bruno 20'; Hamzi 30'; Al-Ammar 35'; Chafaï 60'; Soudani 75'	Report		Stadium: Rogla Stadium

2 August 2022 Friendly	Damac (Saudi Arabia)	2–2	(United Arab Emirates) Al-Nasr	Gornja Radgona, Slovenia
17:30 CEST	Antolić 52'; Soudani 57'	Report		Stadium: Hipodrom Gornja Radgona

6 August 2022 Friendly	Damac (Saudi Arabia)	0–1	(Saudi Arabia) Al-Qadsiah	Zreče, Slovenia
17:00 CEST		Report	Msuva 69'	Stadium: NK Zreče Stadium

9 August 2022 Friendly	Damac (Saudi Arabia)	0–1	(United Arab Emirates) Baniyas	Zreče, Slovenia
16:30 CEST		Report	Giménez	Stadium: Rogla Stadium

== Competitions ==
=== Overview ===
Competition	Record							
Competition	G	W	D	L	GF	GA	GD	Win %
Pro League	30	9	9	12	33	43	−10	30.00
King Cup	1	0	0	1	0	1	−1	0.00
Total	31	9	9	13	33	44	−11	29.03

Updated to match played 31 May 2023
Source: Competitions

=== Pro League ===
==== League table ====
Pos	Team	Pld	W	D	L	GF	GA	GD	Pts
6	Al-Fateh	30	13	4	13	48	43	+5	43
7	Al-Ettifaq	30	10	7	13	28	36	−8	37
8	Damac	30	9	9	12	33	43	−10	36
9	Al-Tai	30	10	4	16	41	49	−8	34 (Note: Al-Tai finished ahead of Al-Raed on head-to-head points: Al-Tai: 4 pts, Al-Raed: 1 pts (Al-Raed 0–2 Al-Tai, Al-Tai 2–2 Al-Raed).)
10	Al-Raed	30	9	7	14	41	49	−8	34

Updated to match(es) played on 31 May 2023. Source: SPL
Rules for classification: 1) Points; 2) Head-to-head points; 3) Head-to-head goal difference; 4) Total goal difference; 5) Total goals scored; 6) Fair-play points (Note: Head-to-head record is used only after all the matches between the teams in question have been played).

==== Results summary ====
Overall								Home						Away					
Pld	W	D	L	GF	GA	GD	Pts	W	D	L	GF	GA	GD	W	D	L	GF	GA	GD
30	9	9	12	33	43	−10	36	5	5	5	16	18	−2	4	4	7	17	25	−8

Last updated: 31 May 2023.
Source: spl.com.sa

==== Results by round ====
Round	1	2	3	4	5	6	7	8	9	10	11	12	13	14	15	16	17	18	19	20	21	22	23	24	25	26	27	28	29	30
Ground	A	H	A	A	H	A	H	A	H	H	A	H	A	H	A	H	A	H	H	A	H	A	H	A	A	H	A	H	A	H
Result	W	W	L	D	W	D	D	W	D	D	D	L	L	W	L	D	L	L	L	W	W	L	D	L	W	L	L	W	D	L
Position	8	4	5	7	6	7	7	6	6	6	6	6	8	6	8	7	7	7	9	8	7	7	7	9	8	9	11	7	7	8

Updated to match(es) played on 31 May 2023. Source: spl.com.sa
A = Away; H = Home; W = Win; D = Draw; L = Loss

==== Matches ====
All times are local, AST (UTC+3).

Win Draw Loss Postponed

25 August 2022 1	Al-Fayha	0–1	Damac	Al Majma'ah
19:05		Report	Chafaï (yellow card) 21'; Antolić 51'	Stadium: Al Majma'ah Sports City; Attendance: 6,291; Referee: Abdullah Al-Shehri

2 September 2022 2	Damac	2–1	Al-Khaleej	Abha
21:00	Hamzi 8'; Maher (yellow card) 50'; Antolić 90+3' (pen.)	Report	Bedrane 10' (o.g.); Al-Nowaiqi (yellow card) 36'; Cikalleshi (yellow card) 82'; Al-Ibrahim (yellow card) 90+4'	Stadium: Prince Sultan bin Abdul Aziz Stadium; Attendance: 746; Referee: Abdullah Al-Harbi

10 September 2022 3	Al-Nassr	2–1	Damac	Riyadh
21:00	Al-Najei 37', (yellow card) 45+3'; Talisca 60'	Report	Chafaï (yellow card) 77'; Duarte 82'	Stadium: Mrsool Park; Attendance: 14,972; Referee: Khaled Al-Teris

16 September 2022 4	Al-Taawoun	1–1	Damac	Buraidah
18:50	Medrán (yellow card) 34'; Antolić 50' (o.g.); Al-Sahafi (yellow card) 90+3'	Report	Duarte 70', (yellow card) 76'; Al-Ammar (yellow card) 89'; Soudani (yellow card) 90+2'	Stadium: King Abdullah Sport City Stadium; Attendance: 4,532; Referee: Mohammed Al-Harbi

1 October 2022 5	Damac	2–0	Al-Tai	Abha
18:30	Al-Ammar 53'; Zeghba 78'	Report	Musona (yellow card) 31'; Qassem (yellow card) 88'	Stadium: Prince Sultan bin Abdul Aziz Stadium; Attendance: 1,608; Referee: Shukri Al-Hanfoush

6 October 2022 6	Al-Batin	2–2	Damac	Hafar al-Batin
21:00	Al-Shammari 46', 88'; Al-Hurayji (yellow card) 53'; Saad (yellow card) 58'	Report	Soudani (yellow card) 38', (goal) 45+2', 69'; Al-Shamrani (yellow card) 49'	Stadium: Al-Batin Club Stadium; Attendance: 3,182; Referee: Mohammed Al-Hoaish

11 October 2022 7	Damac	1–1	Al-Ittihad	Abha
18:15	Zeghba (yellow card) 61'; Duarte 67'; Al-Shammeri (yellow card) 85'	Report	Hamdallah 45+1'; Al-Shamrani (yellow card) 82'	Stadium: Prince Sultan bin Abdul Aziz Stadium; Attendance: 13,266; Referee: Tamás Bognár (Hungary)

16 October 2022 8	Al-Adalah	0–2	Damac	Al-Hasa
20:30	Al-Nattar (yellow card) 3'; Palacios (yellow card) 66'	Report	Soudani 45'; Nono 58'; Al-Shammeri (yellow card) 81'	Stadium: Prince Abdullah bin Jalawi Stadium; Attendance: 12,978; Referee: Sultan Al-Harbi

15 December 2022 9	Damac	0–0	Al-Ettifaq	Abha
15:30	Hawsawi (yellow card) 24'; Maher (yellow card) 86'	Report	F. Al-Ghamdi (red card) 90+7'	Stadium: Prince Sultan bin Abdul Aziz Stadium; Attendance: 311; Referee: Shukri Al-Hanfoush

25 December 2022 10	Damac	0–0	Al-Wehda	Abha
15:30	Al-Nakhli (yellow card) 90+6'	Report	Al-Hafith (yellow card) 51'; Kurdi (yellow card) 82'	Stadium: Prince Sultan bin Abdul Aziz Stadium; Attendance: 356; Referee: Mohammed Al-Daqqash

31 December 2022 11	Al-Hilal	2–2	Damac	Riyadh
20:30	Ighalo 38', (yellow card) 45+1'; Al-Malki (yellow card) 48'; Vietto 51'; Otayf (yellow card) 87'	Report	Hassoun (yellow card) 34'; Al-Shammeri 75'; Al-Shahrani (yellow card) 84', (goal) 90+1'	Stadium: Prince Faisal bin Fahd Stadium; Attendance: 4,889; Referee: Srđan Jovanović (Serbia)

5 January 2023 12	Damac	1–2	Al-Raed	Abha
15:30	Maher (yellow card) 45'; Chafaï 82'; Al-Shamrani (yellow card) 89'; Al-Ammar (yellow card) 90+2'	Report	El Berkaoui 7', (yellow card) 87'; Tavares 19'; M. Al-Dossari (yellow card) 27'; Al-Beshe (yellow card) 90+3'	Stadium: Prince Sultan bin Abdul Aziz Stadium; Attendance: 388; Referee: Mohammed Al-Harbi

13 January 2023 13	Abha	2–1	Damac	Abha
15:30	Al-Sadi 54'; Adam (yellow card) 69'; Al-Amri 90'	Report	Chafaï 14'; W. Al-Enezi (yellow card) 90+5'	Stadium: Prince Sultan bin Abdul Aziz Stadium; Attendance: 1,747; Referee: Sultan Al-Harbi

20 January 2023 14	Damac	3–1	Al-Fateh	Khamis Mushait
18:00	Soudani (yellow card) 39', (goal) 72'; Hawsawi (yellow card) 75'; Duarte 83'; Zeghba (yellow card) 90+9'; Antolić 90+12'	Report	Al-Zubaidi 10'; Petros (yellow card) 41'; Al-Buraikan (yellow card) 45+5'; Al Salis (yellow card) 79'	Stadium: Damac Club Stadium; Attendance: 2,787; Referee: Mohammed Al-Esmaiel

2 February 2023 15	Al-Shabab	2–1	Damac	Riyadh
18:00	Mina 9'; Carlos 10'	Report	Al-Shamrani (yellow card) 3'; Makin 90+1'	Stadium: Prince Faisal bin Fahd Stadium; Attendance: 2,551; Referee: Faisal Al-Blwi

10 February 2023 16	Damac	1–1	Al-Fayha	Khamis Mushait
16:00	Makin (yellow card) 4'; Soudani 37'	Report	Al-Khalaf (yellow card) 12'; Zidan (yellow card) 30'; Trajkovski 65'; Paulinho (yellow card) 79'	Stadium: Damac Club Stadium; Attendance: 3,646; Referee: Sami Al-Jires

18 February 2023 17	Al-Khaleej	2–0	Damac	Dammam
18:00	Al-Shanqiti (yellow card) 29'; Cikalleshi 32', 45' (pen.)	Report	Zeghba (yellow card) 43'; Al-Nakhli (yellow card) 47'; Al-Shammeri (yellow card) 56'	Stadium: Prince Mohamed bin Fahd Stadium; Attendance: 3,807; Referee: Abdullah Al-Harbi

25 February 2023 18	Damac	0–3	Al-Nassr	Abha
18:30	Chafaï (yellow card) 17'	Report	Ronaldo 18' (pen.), 23', 44'; Madu (yellow card) 30'; Al-Hassan (yellow card) 72'; Al-Amri (yellow card) 90+3'	Stadium: Prince Sultan bin Abdul Aziz Stadium; Attendance: 13,434; Referee: Khaled Al-Teris

4 March 2023 19	Damac	1–2	Al-Taawoun	Khamis Mushait
16:00	Soudani (yellow card) 45+9'; Hamzi 56'	Report	Al-Ghamdi (yellow card) 11'; Tawamba 27'; Abdullah (yellow card) 45+2'; Al-Rashidi 47'; Al-Nabit (yellow card) 65'; Al-Mutairi (yellow card) 90+8'	Stadium: Damac Club Stadium; Attendance: 2,795; Referee: Sultan Al-Harbi

11 March 2023 20	Al-Tai	1–3	Damac	Ha'il
16:00	Ali (yellow card) 11'; Al-Jubairi (yellow card) 24'; Harzan 33'; Fai (yellow card) 75'	Report	Munshi (yellow card) 29'; Al-Nakhli (yellow card) 45+2'; A. Al-Shahrani 46'; Makin 64'; Al-Jubairi 74' (o.g.); Bedrane (yellow card) 89'; Nono (yellow card) 90+3'	Stadium: Prince Abdul Aziz bin Musa'ed Stadium; Attendance: 5,890; Referee: Khaled Al-Ahmari

17 March 2023 21	Damac	1–0	Al-Batin	Khamis Mushait
16:00	Al-Ammar 6'; Nono (yellow card) 59'; Makin (yellow card) 87'; Chafaï (yellow card) 90+2'; Zeghba (yellow card) 90+10'	Report	Saad (yellow card) 90+9'; N. Al-Sohaymi (yellow card) 90+10'	Stadium: Damac Club Stadium; Attendance: 3,316; Referee: Mohammed Al-Esmaiel

4 April 2023 22	Al-Ittihad	3–0	Damac	Jeddah
22:00	Henrique 14'; Sharahili (yellow card) 18'; Bamsaud (yellow card) 21' (yellow-red card) 73'; Romarinho 37' (pen.); Hegazi 87'	Report	Munshi (yellow card) 39'; Al-Nakhli (yellow card) 75'	Stadium: King Abdullah Sports City; Attendance: 38,414; Referee: István Kovács (Romania)

10 April 2023 23	Damac	2–2	Al-Adalah	Khamis Mushait
22:00	Bedrane 16'; Nono 32'; Zeghba (yellow card) 44'; Hassoun (yellow card) 85'; Al-Enezi (yellow card) 89'	Report	Antonsson 28' (pen.), 30'; Al Haydar (yellow card) 45'; Al-Oufi (yellow card) 45+2'	Stadium: Damac Club Stadium; Attendance: 3,302; Referee: Mohammed Al-Hoaish

28 April 2023 24	Al-Ettifaq	2–0	Damac	Dammam
19:00	Vitinho (yellow card) 27'; F. Al-Ghamdi (yellow card) 45+2'; Niakaté 89', 90+6'	Report	Al-Nakhli (yellow card) 49'; Hawsawi (yellow card) 50'; Bedrane (red card) 58'	Stadium: Prince Mohamed bin Fahd Stadium; Attendance: 2,208; Referee: Mohammed Al-Esmaiel

3 May 2023 25	Al-Wehda	0–2	Damac	Mecca
21:30	Yoda (yellow card) 39'	Report	Duarte (yellow card) 19'; Hamzi (yellow card) 58'; Soudani 65'; Chafaï 90+1'	Stadium: King Abdul Aziz Stadium; Attendance: 468; Referee: Sami Al-Jires

15 May 2023 27	Al-Raed	5–0	Damac	Buraidah
19:00	El Berkaoui 10', 85'; Fouzair 20' (pen.), 60', 90+4'; Al-Farhan (yellow card) 51'	Report	Hassoun (yellow card) 46'; Maher (yellow card) 50'	Stadium: King Abdullah Sport City Stadium; Attendance: 2,901; Referee: Shukri Al-Hanfoush

19 May 2023 26	Damac	0–1	Al-Hilal	Abha
19:00	Bedrane (yellow card) 19'; Munshi (yellow card) 44'; Al-Shamrani (yellow card) 59'	Report	Vietto (yellow card) 4'; K. Al-Dawsari (yellow card) 45+2'; Marega 70'; Al-Wotayan (yellow card) 90+3'	Stadium: Prince Sultan bin Abdul Aziz Stadium; Attendance: 13,413; Referee: Abdullah Al-Harbi

22 May 2023 28	Damac	1–0	Abha	Abha
19:00	Al-Ammar 56'; Munshi (yellow card) 65'; Nono (yellow card) 72'	Report	Saddiki (yellow card) 42'; Al-Sadi (red card) 57'	Stadium: Prince Sultan bin Abdul Aziz Stadium; Attendance: 2,105; Referee: Abdulsamad Bakri

27 May 2023 29	Al-Fateh	1–1	Damac	Al-Hasa
21:00	Al-Buraikan 29'; Petros (yellow card) 64'; Buhimed (yellow card) 74'	Report	Maher (yellow card) 23'; Nono 71'; Zeghba (yellow card) 82'; Bedrane (yellow card) 86'; Al-Najjar (yellow card) 88'	Stadium: Prince Abdullah bin Jalawi Stadium; Attendance: 7,324; Referee: Fareeh Al-Jaloud

31 May 2023 30	Damac	1–4	Al-Shabab	Abha
21:00	Makin 22'; Al-Najei (red card) 49'; Nono (yellow card) 67'; Al-Shammeri (yellow card) 80'	Report	Boupendza 13', 65', 89', 90+3'; Santos (yellow card) 45+2'; Al-Qahtani (yellow card) 59'; Krychowiak (yellow card) 72'	Stadium: Prince Sultan bin Abdul Aziz Stadium; Attendance: 609; Referee: Mohammed Al-Harbi

=== King Cup ===
All times are local, AST (UTC+3).

20 December 2022 Round of 16	Damac	0–1	Al-Wehda	Abha
15:30	Al-Shamrani (red card) 62'; Maher (yellow card) 68'	Report	Fajr (yellow card) 80'; Anselmo 82'	Stadium: Prince Sultan bin Abdul Aziz Stadium; Referee: Mohammed Al-Beredi

== Statistics ==
=== Appearances ===
Last updated on 31 May 2023.

No.	Pos	Nat	Player	Total		Pro League		King Cup	
No.	Pos	Nat	Player	Apps	Goals	Apps	Goals	Apps	Goals
Goalkeepers
1	GK	(Saudi Arabia) KSA	Bandar Al-Shahrani	0	0	0	0	0	0
22	GK	(Saudi Arabia) KSA	Abdulbassit Hawsawi	1	0	1	0	0	0
30	GK	(Algeria) ALG	Moustapha Zeghba	29	1	28	1	1	0
33	GK	(Saudi Arabia) KSA	Mohammed Al-Mahasneh	1	0	1	0	0	0
Defenders
3	DF	(Algeria) ALG	Abdelkader Bedrane	20	1	20	1	0	0
4	DF	(Saudi Arabia) KSA	Ibrahim Al-Nakhli	18	0	13+4	0	0+1	0
13	DF	(Saudi Arabia) KSA	Abdullah Al-Ammar	27	3	25+2	3	0	0
15	DF	(Algeria) ALG	Farouk Chafaï	28	3	27	3	1	0
19	DF	(Saudi Arabia) KSA	Abdullah Hawsawi	21	0	14+6	0	1	0
20	DF	(Saudi Arabia) KSA	Dhari Al-Anazi	12	0	3+9	0	0	0
32	DF	(Saudi Arabia) KSA	Abdullah Hassoun	20	0	10+9	0	1	0
40	DF	(Saudi Arabia) KSA	Hassan Al-Shamrani	20	0	13+6	0	1	0
Midfielders
6	MF	(Netherlands) NED	Adam Maher	30	0	29	0	1	0
7	MF	(Saudi Arabia) KSA	Mansor Hamzi	28	2	22+6	2	0	0
8	MF	(Saudi Arabia) KSA	Ryan Al-Mousa	16	0	1+14	0	0+1	0
10	MF	(Spain) ESP	Nono	24	3	21+2	3	1	0
11	MF	(Saudi Arabia) KSA	Abdulelah Al-Shammeri	22	1	10+11	1	0+1	0
12	MF	(Saudi Arabia) KSA	Abdulaziz Makin	16	3	7+9	3	0	0
14	MF	(Saudi Arabia) KSA	Abdulaziz Al-Shahrani	19	2	5+14	2	0	0
16	MF	(Saudi Arabia) KSA	Bader Munshi	7	0	5+2	0	0	0
17	MF	(Croatia) CRO	Domagoj Antolić	27	3	26	3	1	0
18	MF	(Saudi Arabia) KSA	Muhannad Al-Najei	2	0	1+1	0	0	0
23	MF	(Saudi Arabia) KSA	Abdulaziz Majrashi	15	0	3+12	0	0	0
24	MF	(Saudi Arabia) KSA	Waleed Al-Enezi	5	0	0+5	0	0	0
38	MF	(Saudi Arabia) KSA	Ammar Al-Najjar	10	0	2+8	0	0	0
79	MF	(Saudi Arabia) KSA	Fares Al-Shahrani	1	0	0+1	0	0	0
Forwards
2	FW	(Algeria) ALG	Hillal Soudani	21	6	17+3	6	1	0
9	FW	(Brazil) BRA	Bruno Duarte	19	4	17+1	4	1	0
99	FW	(Saudi Arabia) KSA	Rayan Al-Qahtani	6	0	0+5	0	0+1	0
Players sent out on loan this season
49	MF	(Saudi Arabia) KSA	Ahmed Al-Zain	13	0	9+3	0	1	0

=== Goalscorers ===
Rank	No.	Pos	Nat	Name	Pro League	King Cup	Total
1	2	FW	(Algeria)	Hillal Soudani	6	0	6
2	9	FW	(Brazil)	Bruno Duarte	4	0	4
3	10	MF	(Spain)	Nono	3	0	3
3	12	MF	(Saudi Arabia)	Abdulaziz Makin	3	0	3
3	13	DF	(Saudi Arabia)	Abdullah Al-Ammar	3	0	3
3	15	DF	(Algeria)	Farouk Chafaï	3	0	3
3	17	MF	(Croatia)	Domagoj Antolić	3	0	3
8	7	MF	(Saudi Arabia)	Mansor Hamzi	2	0	2
8	14	MF	(Saudi Arabia)	Abdulaziz Al-Shahrani	2	0	2
10	3	DF	(Algeria)	Abdelkader Bedrane	1	0	1
10	11	MF	(Saudi Arabia)	Abdulelah Al-Shammeri	1	0	1
10	30	GK	(Algeria)	Moustapha Zeghba	1	0	1
Own goal					1	0	1
Total					33	0	33

Last Updated: 31 May 2023

=== Assists ===
Rank	No.	Pos	Nat	Name	Pro League	King Cup	Total
1	15	DF	(Algeria)	Farouk Chafaï	4	0	4
1	17	MF	(Croatia)	Domagoj Antolić	4	0	4
3	2	FW	(Algeria)	Hillal Soudani	3	0	3
3	6	MF	(Netherlands)	Adam Maher	3	0	3
3	49	MF	(Saudi Arabia)	Ahmed Al-Zain	3	0	3
6	10	MF	(Spain)	Nono	2	0	2
6	13	DF	(Saudi Arabia)	Abdullah Al-Ammar	2	0	2
8	7	MF	(Saudi Arabia)	Mansor Hamzi	1	0	1
8	23	MF	(Saudi Arabia)	Abdulaziz Majrashi	1	0	1
8	32	DF	(Saudi Arabia)	Abdullah Hassoun	1	0	1
Total					24	0	24

Last Updated: 27 May 2023

=== Clean sheets ===
Rank	No.	Pos	Nat	Name	Pro League	King Cup	Total
1	30	GK	(Algeria)	Moustapha Zeghba	8	0	8
Total					8	0	8

Last Updated: 22 May 2023
