= Abdullah Al-Ammar =

Saudi Arabian footballer

Personal information
- Full name: Abdullah Khaled Al-Ammar
- Date of birth: March 1, 1994 (age 32)
- Place of birth: Riyadh, Saudi Arabia
- Height: 1.70 m (5 ft 7 in)
- Position: Left-back

Team information
- Current team: Al-Hazem

Youth career
- 2010-2015: Al-Hilal

Senior career*
| Years | Team | Apps | (Gls) |
| 2015–2017 | Al-Hilal | 0 | (0) |
| 2016–2017 | → Al-Fateh (loan) | 15 | (0) |
| 2017–2019 | Al-Fateh | 28 | (0) |
| 2019–2020 | Al-Ittihad | 8 | (0) |
| 2020–2023 | Damac | 84 | (8) |
| 2023–2026 | Al-Ahli | 31 | (1) |
| 2026– | Al-Hazem | 0 | (0) |

International career
| 2013–2016 | Saudi Arabia U23 | | |
- * Club domestic league appearances and goals as of 22 April 2025

Abdullah Al-Ammar (Arabic: عبدالله العمار; born 1 March 1994) is a Saudi Arabian professional footballer who currently plays for Al-Hazem as a left-back.

== Career ==
On 17 August 2016, Al-Ammar joined Al-Fateh on a one-year loan from Al-Hilal. On 9 July 2017, Al-Ammar joined Al-Fateh on a two-year deal. On 4 January 2019, Al-Ammar joined Al-Ittihad on a two-and-a-half-year deal. On 1 October 2020, Al-Ammar joined Damac on a free transfer. On 1 September 2021, Al-Ammar renewed his contract with Damac. On 7 September 2023, Al-Ammar joined Al-Ahli on a three-year deal. On 3 February 2026, Al-Ammar joined Al-Hazem.

== Career statistics ==
=== Club ===
As of match played 27 May 2024

| Club | Season | League | | King Cup | | Asia | | Other | | Total | |
| Club | Season | Apps | Goals | Apps | Goals | Apps | Goals | Apps | Goals | Apps | Goals |
|---|---|---|---|---|---|---|---|---|---|---|---|
| Al-Fateh (loan) | 2016–17 | 15 | 0 | 2 | 0 | 5 | 0 | 1 (Note: Appearances in Crown Prince Cup) | 0 | 23 | 0 |
| Al-Fateh | 2017–18 | 19 | 0 | 2 | 0 | — | | 1 | 0 | 22 | 0 |
| Al-Fateh | 2018–19 | 9 | 0 | 0 | 0 | — | | — | | 9 | 0 |
| Al-Fateh | Total | 43 | 0 | 4 | 0 | 5 | 0 | 2 | 0 | 54 | 0 |
| Al-Ittihad | 2018–19 | 5 | 0 | 3 | 1 | 3 | 0 | 0 | 0 | 11 | 1 |
| Al-Ittihad | 2019–20 | 3 | 0 | 1 | 0 | 0 | 0 | 0 | 0 | 4 | 0 |
| Al-Ittihad | Total | 8 | 0 | 4 | 1 | 3 | 0 | 0 | 0 | 15 | 1 |
| Damac | 2020–21 | 24 | 2 | 0 | 0 | — | | — | | 24 | 2 |
| Damac | 2021–22 | 28 | 1 | 1 | 0 | — | | — | | 29 | 1 |
| Damac | 2022–23 | 27 | 3 | 0 | 0 | — | | — | | 27 | 3 |
| Damac | 2023–24 | 5 | 2 | 0 | 0 | — | | — | | 5 | 2 |
| Damac | Total | 84 | 8 | 1 | 0 | 0 | 0 | 0 | 0 | 85 | 8 |
| Al-Ahli | 2023–24 | 18 | 1 | 1 | 0 | — | | — | | 19 | 1 |
| Career totals | | 153 | 9 | 10 | 1 | 8 | 0 | 2 | 0 | 173 | 10 |
