= Mohammed Al-Mahasneh =

Saudi Arabian footballer (born 1998)

Personal information
- Full name: Mohammed Jassem Habib Al-Mahasneh
- Date of birth: 1 July 1997 (age 29)
- Place of birth: Qatif, Saudi Arabia
- Height: 1.80 m (5 ft 11 in)
- Position: Goalkeeper

Team information
- Current team: Al-Shabab
- Number: 33

Youth career
- –2013: Mudhar
- 2013–2019: Al-Ahli
- 2019: Fátima

Senior career*
Years	Team	Apps	(Gls)
2019–2024	Damac	14	(0)
2024–2025	Al-Ittihad	10	(0)
2025–	Al-Shabab	3	(0)
- * Club domestic league appearances and goals as of 25 August 2026

Mohammed Al-Mahasneh (Arabic: محمد المحاسنة; born 1 July 1997) is a Saudi Arabian professional footballer who plays as a goalkeeper for Pro League side Al-Shabab.

== Club career ==
Al-Mahasneh started his career at Mudhar. He joined Al-Ahli on 30 August 2013 at age of 16. On 15 January 2019, Al-Mahsneh left Al-Ahli and joined Portuguese side Fátima. On 11 July 2019, Al-Mahasneh joined Damac. On 20 November 2021, Al-Mahsneh made his debut and kept a clean sheet for Damac in the 1–0 win against Al-Fayha. On 30 January 2024, Al-Mahasneh joined Al-Ittihad on a three-year deal. On 20 August 2025, Al-Mahasneh joined Al-Shabab.

== Honours ==
Al-Ittihad

- Saudi Pro League: 2024–25
- King's Cup: 2024–25

== Career statistics ==
As of match played 26 May 2025

Appearances and goals by club, season and competition
Club	Season	League			National cup		Continental		Other		Total	
Club	Season	Division	Apps	Goals	Apps	Goals	Apps	Goals	Apps	Goals	Apps	Goals
Damac	2019–20	Saudi Pro League	0	0	0	0	—		—		0	0
Damac	2020–21	Saudi Pro League	0	0	0	0	—		—		0	0
Damac	2021–22	Saudi Pro League	5	0	1	0	—		—		6	0
Damac	2022–23	Saudi Pro League	1	0	0	0	—		—		1	0
Damac	2023–24	Saudi Pro League	8	0	0	0	—		—		8	0
Damac	Total		14	0	1	0	—		—		15	0
Al-Ittihad	2023–24	Saudi Pro League	5	0	0	0	0	0	0	0	5	0
Al-Ittihad	2024–25	Saudi Pro League	5	0	0	0	—		—		5	0
Al-Ittihad	Total		10	0	0	0	0	0	0	0	10	0
Al-Shabab	2025–26	Saudi Pro League	0	0	0	0	–		–		0	0
Career total			24	0	1	0	0	0	0	0	25	0
