= Abdulaziz Majrashi (footballer, born 1996) =

Saudi Arabian footballer

Personal information
- Full name: Abdulaziz Rasheed Majrashi
- Date of birth: 10 March 1996 (age 30)
- Place of birth: Saudi Arabia
- Height: 1.73 m (5 ft 8 in)
- Position: Midfielder

Team information
- Current team: Al-Wehda
- Number: 23

Youth career
- –2017: Al-Ettifaq

Senior career*
Years	Team	Apps	(Gls)
2017–2020	Al-Ettifaq	21	(1)
2018	→ Fayha (loan)	0	(0)
2019	→ Al-Batin (loan)	12	(0)
2019–2020	→ Al-Hazem (loan)	6	(0)
2020–2024	Damac	81	(0)
2024–2025	Al-Jabalain	34	(0)
2025–	Al-Wehda	0	(0)
- * Club domestic league appearances and goals as of 27 June 2022

Abdulaziz Rasheed Majrashi (Arabic: عَبْد الْعَزِيز رَشِيد مَجْرَشِيّ; born 10 March 1996) is a Saudi Arabian professional footballer who plays as a midfielder for Al-Wehda.

== Club career ==
Majrashi began his career at Al-Ettifaq and signed a five-year contract with the club on 31 January 2017. He made his senior debut and scored his first goal with the club during the league match against Al-Khaleej, on 8 April 2017. On 2 February 2018, Majrashi joined Al-Fayha on loan until the end of the 2017–18 season. He made no appearances with the club and returned to Al-Ettifaq following the conclusion of the season. On 1 January 2019, he joined Al-Batin on loan until the end of the 2018–19 season. He made 15 appearances and scored no goals in all competitions as Al-Batin were relegated at the end of the season. On 7 August 2019, Majrashi was loaned out to Al-Hazem until the end of the 2019–20 season. On 26 October 2020, Majrashi joined Damac on a free transfer. On 23 July 2022, Majrashi renewed his contract with Damac until the end of the 2023–24 season. On 22 August 2024, Majrashi joined Al-Jabalain. In September 2025, Majrashi joined Al-Wehda.

== Career statistics ==
=== Club ===
As of 27 May 2024

Club	Season	League		King Cup		Asia		Other		Total	
Club	Season	Apps	Goals	Apps	Goals	Apps	Goals	Apps	Goals	Apps	Goals
Al-Ettifaq	2016–17	5	1	1	0	—		0	0	6	1
Al-Ettifaq	2017–18	13	0	0	0	—		—		13	0
Al-Ettifaq	2018–19	3	0	0	0	—		—		3	0
Al-Ettifaq	Total	21	1	1	0	0	0	0	0	22	1
Al-Fayha (loan)	2017–18	0	0	0	0	—		—		0	0
Al-Batin (loan)	2018–19	12	0	3	0	—		—		15	0
Al-Hazem (loan)	2019–20	6	0	1	0	—		—		7	0
Damac	2020–21	19	0	0	0	—		—		19	0
Damac	2021–22	27	0	1	0	—		—		28	0
Damac	2022–23	15	0	0	0	—		—		15	0
Damac	2023–24	20	0	2	0	—		—		22	0
Damac	Total	81	0	3	0	0	0	0	0	84	0
Career totals		120	1	8	0	0	0	0	0	128	1
