= Domagoj Antolić =

Croatian footballer (born 1990)

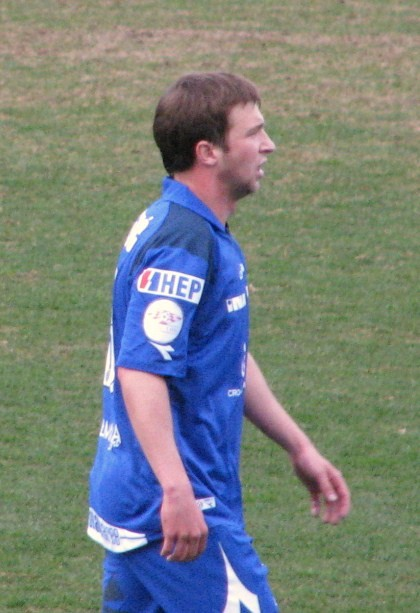

Personal information
- Date of birth: 30 June 1990 (age 36)
- Place of birth: Zagreb, SR Croatia, Yugoslavia
- Height: 1.80 m (5 ft 11 in)
- Position: Midfielder

Team information
- Current team: Lokomotiva Zagreb
- Number: 10

Youth career
- Ponikve
- Dinamo Zagreb

Senior career*
Years	Team	Apps	(Gls)
2007–2010	Dinamo Zagreb	16	(0)
2008–2009	→ Lokomotiva Zagreb (loan)	11	(1)
2010–2013	Lokomotiva Zagreb	60	(13)
2013–2018	Dinamo Zagreb	101	(6)
2018–2021	Legia Warsaw	77	(4)
2021–2024	Damac	85	(9)
2024–	Lokomotiva Zagreb	26	(1)

International career
2005	Croatia U15	1	(0)
2005–2006	Croatia U16	11	(0)
2008	Croatia U18	4	(1)
2008	Croatia U19	11	(2)
2008	Croatia U20	1	(0)
2011–2013	Croatia U21	5	(0)
2014–2017	Croatia	6	(0)
- * Club domestic league appearances and goals as of 15 June 2026

Domagoj Antolić (Croatian pronunciation: [dômaɡoj ǎntolitɕ]; born 30 June 1990) is a Croatian professional footballer who plays as a midfielder for Lokomotiva Zagreb.

== Club career ==
Antolić was promoted to the GNK Dinamo Zagreb first team during the spring of 2008. He made his debut in the eternal derby, coming on as a last minute substitute, on 8 March 2008. Antolić made four more appearances that season, all as a substitute.

The next year he went on a season long loan to Dinamo's farm side NK Lokomotiva, who were then in the second division. Antolić had a successful time at Lokomotiva, a consistent starter throughout the season, scoring six goals in a season in which Lokomotiva won promotion.

Antolić returned to Lokomotiva on a six-month loan deal and made 11 appearances for Lokomotiva, now in the first division, before returning to Dinamo in January 2010. At Dinamo, he made 10 appearances until the end of the 09/10 season, helping his side win the title.

Antolić was purchased outright by Lokomotiva in the summer of 2010 on a free transfer due to good relations between Dinamo and Lokomotiva. Antolić sustained a heavy injury early on and therefore made just six appearances that season. The next season, Antolić came back and had one of his best seasons to date, making 25 appearances and scoring four goals. The season after that, the 12/13 season, was even better. Antolić made 29 appearances, scoring seven goals and providing five further assists from central midfield and even captained his side towards the end of the season. It was after this season that Dinamo decided to bring him back, a transfer once again made easier due to the good relations between the two sides.

In the first season of his third spell at Dinamo, Antolić made 39 appearances playing in a range of positions across midfield.

== International career ==
On 12 November 2014, he made an official senior national team debut for Croatia, starting and playing 90 minutes in a friendly game against Argentina, wearing a jersey numbered 21. He has earned a total of 6 caps, scoring no goals. His final international cap was a January 2017 China Cup match against China.

== Career statistics ==
=== Club ===
As of match played on 10 May 2024

Appearances and goals by club, season and competition
Club	Season	League			National cup (Note: Includes Croatian Cup, Polish Cup, King's Cup)		Other		Total	
Club	Season	Division	Apps	Goals	Apps	Goals	Apps	Goals	Apps	Goals
Dinamo Zagreb	2007–08	Croatian First Football League	5	0	0	0	—		5	0
Dinamo Zagreb	2009–10	Croatian First Football League	10	0	1	0	—		11	0
Dinamo Zagreb	2010–11	Croatian First Football League	1	0	0	0	—		1	0
Dinamo Zagreb	Total		16	0	1	0	0	0	17	0
Lokomotiva (loan)	2009–10	Croatian First Football League	11	1	0	0	—		11	1
Lokomotiva (loan)	Total		11	1	0	0	0	0	11	1
Lokomotiva	2010–11	Croatian First Football League	6	1	0	0	—		6	1
Lokomotiva	2011–12	Croatian First Football League	25	4	0	0	—		25	4
Lokomotiva	2012–13	Croatian First Football League	29	8	6	2	—		35	10
Lokomotiva	Total		60	13	6	2	0	0	66	15
Dinamo Zagreb	2013–14	Croatian First Football League	26	2	7	2	7 (Note: Three appearances in UEFA Champions League, three appearances in UEFA Europa League and one appearance in Croatian Football Super Cup)	0	40	4
Dinamo Zagreb	2014–15	Croatian First Football League	13	0	1	0	13 (Note: Eight appearances in UEFA Europa League, four appearances in UEFA Champions League and one appearance in Croatian Football Super Cup)	2	27	2
Dinamo Zagreb	2015–16	Croatian First Football League	24	0	4	0	9 (Note: Appearances in UEFA Champions League)	0	37	0
Dinamo Zagreb	2016–17	Croatian First Football League	23	4	1	0	8	0	32	4
Dinamo Zagreb	2017–18	Croatian First Football League	15	0	2	0	2 (Note: Appearances in UEFA Europa League)	0	19	0
Dinamo Zagreb	Total		101	6	15	2	39	2	155	10
Legia Warsaw	2017–18	Ekstraklasa	12	1	3	0	—		15	1
Legia Warsaw	2018–19	Ekstraklasa	25	0	2	0	3	0	30	0
Legia Warsaw	2019–20	Ekstraklasa	32	3	4	0	4	0	40	3
Legia Warsaw	2020–21	Ekstraklasa	8	0	1	0	4 (Note: Two appearances in UEFA Champions League, one appearance in UEFA Europa League and one appearance in Polish Super Cup)	0	13	0
Legia Warsaw	Total		77	4	10	0	11	0	98	4
Damac	2020–21	Saudi Professional League	17	3	0	0	—		17	3
Damac	2021–22	Saudi Professional League	12	0	0	0	—		12	0
Damac	2022–23	Saudi Professional League	26	3	1	0	—		27	3
Damac	2023–24	Saudi Professional League	30	3	2	0	—		32	3
Damac	Total		85	9	3	0	0	0	88	9
Career totals			350	33	35	4	50	2	435	39

=== International ===
Appearances and goals by national team and year
National team	Year	Apps	Goals
Croatia
Croatia	2014	1	0
Croatia	2016	3	0
Croatia	2017	2	0
Total		6	0

== Honours ==
Dinamo Zagreb

- Croatian Football League: 2007–08, 2009–10, 2013–14, 2014–15, 2015–16
- Croatian Cup: 2014–15, 2015–16
- Croatian Super Cup: 2013

Legia Warsaw

- Ekstraklasa: 2017–18, 2019–20
- Polish Cup: 2017–18

Individual

- Ekstraklasa Midfielder of the Season: 2019–20
