= Ayel Haqawi =

Saudi Arabian footballer

Personal information
- Full name: Ayel Salem Mohammed Haqawi
- Date of birth: 26 September 1994 (age 32)
- Place of birth: Saudi Arabia
- Position: Left back

Team information
- Current team: Al-Nahda
- Number: 3

Youth career
- Al-Nassr
- Al-Faisaly

Senior career*
Years	Team	Apps	(Gls)
2016–2018	Najran	35	(1)
2018–2019	Al-Nahda	34	(0)
2019–2020	Al-Shoulla	34	(0)
2020	Damac	0	(0)
2020–2021	Al-Bukayriyah	32	(0)
2021–2022	Al-Ain	22	(0)
2022–2023	Al-Nahda		
2023	Hajer		
2023–2024	Al-Nairyah		
2025–	Al-Nahda		
- * Club domestic league appearances and goals as of 30 September 2020

Ayel Haqawi (Arabic: عائل حقوي; born 26 September 1994) is a Saudi Arabian professional footballer who plays as a left back for Al-Nahda.

== Club career ==
Haqawi started his career in the youth team of Al-Nassr before moving to Al-Faisaly's U23 side. On 6 December 2016, Haqawi joined Najran. He made his debut ten days later by coming off the bench in the 75th minute in the win 1–0 against Al-Nahda. On 6 June 2018, Haqawi joined Al-Nahda. He made his debut for Al-Nahda on 28 August 2018 in the league match against Al-Shoulla. On 15 July 2019, Haqawi left Al-Nahda and joined Al-Shoulla on a one-year deal. He made his debut on 21 August 2019, in the league match against Al-Ain. On 25 September 2020, Haqawi joined Pro League side Damac. On 12 October 2020, Haqawi joined Al-Bukayriyah. On 3 September 2021, Haqawi joined Al-Ain.

On 29 June 2023, Haqawi joined Hajer.
