= Emilio Zelaya =

Argentine footballer

Personal information
- Full name: Emilio José Zelaya
- Date of birth: 30 July 1987 (age 39)
- Place of birth: San Miguel de Tucumán, Argentina
- Height: 1.86 m (6 ft 1 in)
- Position: Forward

Senior career*
Years	Team	Apps	(Gls)
2006–2012	Rosario Central	115	(21)
2010–2011	→ Banfield (loan)	12	(5)
2011–2012	→ Arsenal de Sarandí (loan)	32	(12)
2012–2015	Arsenal de Sarandí	82	(14)
2015–2016	O'Higgins	13	(2)
2016	Argentinos Juniors	14	(1)
2016–2017	Ethnikos Achna	30	(15)
2017–2020	Apollon Limassol	70	(35)
2020–2022	Damac	71	(45)
2022–2023	Karmiotissa	15	(3)
2023	Ohod	15	(1)
- * Club domestic league appearances and goals as of 8 May 2024

Emilio José Zelaya (born 30 July 1987 in San Miguel de Tucumán) is an Argentine with Italian passport football forward.

Zelaya made his first team debut in 2006, but he came to prominence in 2008 after scoring two goals in a 3–1 away win against Olimpo de Bahía Blanca on 14 March 2008.

== Career ==
=== O'Higgins ===
In July 2015, he joined O'Higgins for one season, starting for the 2015–16 season.

== Career statistics ==
As of match played 20 December 2022

Club	Season	League			Cup		Continental		Other		Total	
Club	Season	Division	Apps	Goals	Apps	Goals	Apps	Goals	Apps	Goals	Apps	Goals
Banfield (loan)	2010–11	Argentine Primera División	11	2	—		2	1	—		13	3
Arsenal de Sarandí (loan)	2011–12	Argentine Primera División	32	10	0	0	11	2	—		43	12
Arsenal de Sarandí	2012–13	Argentine Primera División	19	4	1	1	1	0	1 (Note: Appearances in Supercopa Argentina)	0	22	5
Arsenal de Sarandí	2013–14	Argentine Primera División	23	1	1	0	8	1	—		32	2
Arsenal de Sarandí	2014	Argentine Primera División	18	7	0	0	—		—		18	7
Arsenal de Sarandí	Total		60	12	2	1	9	1	1	0	72	14
O'Higgins	2015–16	Chilean Primera División	13	2	4	1	—		—		17	3
Argentinos Juniors	2016	Argentine Primera División	14	1	0	0	—		—		14	1
Ethnikos Achna	2016–17	Cypriot First Division	30	15	2	0	—		—		32	15
Apollon Limassol	2017–18	Cypriot First Division	32	17	6	1	11	2	1	0	50	20
Apollon Limassol	2018–19	Cypriot First Division	26	10	4	0	10	6	—		40	16
Apollon Limassol	2019–20	Cypriot First Division	12	8	1	2	7	5	—		20	15
Apollon Limassol	Total		70	35	11	3	28	13	1	0	110	51
Damac	2019–20	SPL	16	13	0	0	—		—		16	13
Damac	2020–21	SPL	28	19	1	1	—		—		29	20
Damac	2021–22	SPL	27	13	1	0	—		—		28	13
Damac	Total		71	45	2	1	0	0	0	0	73	46
Karmiotissa	2022–23	Cypriot First Division	14	3	1	0	—		—		15	3
Career Total			315	125	22	6	50	17	2	0	389	148

== Honours ==
Arsenal

- Argentine Primera División (1): 2012 Clausura
- Supercopa Argentina (1): 2012
- Copa Argentina (1): 2013
