= Mohanad Fallatah =

Saudi Arabian footballer

Mohanad Fallatah مهند فلاته
Personal information
- Full name: Mohanad Abdulhaleem Omar Fallatah
- Date of birth: February 2, 1996 (age 30)
- Place of birth: Saudi Arabia
- Height: 1.85 m (6 ft 1 in)
- Position: Midfielder

Team information
- Current team: Al-Shoulla
- Number: 28

Youth career
- –2017: Al-Hilal

Senior career*
Years	Team	Apps	(Gls)
2017–2019	Al-Hilal	5	(0)
2019	→ Al-Fayha (loan)	9	(0)
2019–2020	Al-Fayha	7	(0)
2020–2021	Damac	4	(0)
2021–2022	Al-Adalah	0	(0)
2022–	Al-Shoulla	0	(0)
- * Club domestic league appearances and goals as of 6 May 2020

Mohanad Fallatah (Arabic: مهند فلاته; born 2 February 1996) is a Saudi Arabian professional footballer who plays as a midfielder for Al-Shoulla.

== Career ==
Fallatah started his career at the youth team of Al-Hilal in 2017. He signed a half-year contract with Al-Fayha on loan from Al-Hilal on 22 January 2019. He left Al-Hilal and joined the Pro League side Al-Fayha on June 13, 2019. On 21 October 2020, he joined Damac. On 10 September 2021, he joined Al-Adalah. On 16 January 2022, Fallatah joined Al-Shoulla.
