= Khalid Sharahili =

Saudi Arabian footballer

Personal information
- Full name: Khalid Mohammed Sharahili
- Date of birth: February 3, 1988 (age 38)
- Place of birth: Riyadh, Saudi Arabia
- Height: 1.88 m (6 ft 2 in)
- Position: Goalkeeper

Team information
- Current team: Al-Anwar
- Number: 1

Youth career
- 2001–2005: Sdoos
- 2005–2007: Al-Hilal

Senior career*
Years	Team	Apps	(Gls)
2007–2017	Al-Hilal	67	(0)
2008–2009	→ Al-Raed (loan)	15	(0)
2017	→ Al-Raed (loan)	6	(0)
2017–2019	Al-Faisaly	0	(0)
2019	Ohod	4	(0)
2019–2021	Damac	10	(0)
2021–2022	Ohod	12	(0)
2022–2024	Al-Shaeib		
2024–	Al-Anwar		

International career^{‡}
2015–2017	Saudi Arabia	10	(0)
- * Club domestic league appearances and goals as of 00:40, 26 April 2018 (UTC) ‡ National team caps and goals as of 12:37, 17 April 2018 (UTC)

Khalid Sharahili (Arabic: خالد شراحيلي; born 3 February 1988) is a Saudi Arabian footballer who plays for Al-Anwar as a goalkeeper. He also represented the Saudi Arabia national football team.

== Club career ==
=== Al-Hilal ===
In 2007, Khalid joined Al-Hilal after being promoted from the youth system. On 13 January 2013, SAFF banned Khalid from any football activity for two years after finding that he took steroids. On 13 January 2015, Khalid ended his suspension. On 26 April 2015, Khalid broke the record of the most minutes without conceding a goal with 788 minutes. On 5 June 2015, Khalid saved a penalty in the shootout against Al-Nassr in the Kings Cup which made them win the trophy. On 8 May 2016, manager Georgios Donis dropped Khalid due to his poor form. On 10 August 2017, Al-Hilal released Khaild due to his poor attitude.

== Honours ==
=== Club ===
Al-Hilal

- Professional League (3): 2007-08, 2009-10, 2010-11
- King Cup (1): 2015
- Crown Prince Cup (5): 2007-08, 2009-10, 2010-11, 2011-12, 2015-16
- Super Cup (1): 2015
