= Ibrahim Al-Barakah =

Saudi Arabian footballer

Ibrahim Al-Barakah إبراهيم البركة
Personal information
- Full name: Ibrahim Ali Al-Barakah
- Date of birth: 13 September 1996 (age 30)
- Place of birth: Saudi Arabia
- Height: 1.85 m (6 ft 1 in)
- Position: Midfielder

Team information
- Current team: Al-Bukiryah
- Number: 81

Youth career
- –2016: Al-Taawoun

Senior career*
Years	Team	Apps	(Gls)
2016–2018	Al-Taawoun	2	(0)
2018–2019	Al-Mujazzal		
2019–2020	Al-Bukiryah	32	(1)
2020–2021	Damac	0	(0)
2020–2021	→ Al-Hazem (loan)	28	(0)
2021–2023	Al-Hazem	17	(0)
2021–2022	→ Al-Fayha (loan)	6	(0)
2023–	Al-Bukiryah		
- * Club domestic league appearances and goals as of 20 September 2020

Ibrahim Al-Barakah (Arabic: إبراهيم البركة; born 13 September 1996) is a Saudi Arabian professional footballer who plays as a midfielder for Al-Bukiryah.

== Club career ==
Al Barakah started his career at Al-Taawoun and was called up to the first team during the 2016–17 season. He made his debut in the league match against Al-Fayha on 29 December 2017. On 20 August 2018, Al-Barakah left Al-Taawoun and joined First Division side Al-Mujazzal. On 22 July 2019, Al-Barakah joined Al-Bukiryah. On 16 September 2020, Al-Barakah joined Pro League side Damac. On 25 October 2021, Al-Barakah joined Al-Hazem on loan. He won the MS League with Al-Hazem and gained promotion to the Pro League during the 2020–21 season. On 12 July 2021, Al-Barakah joined Al-Hazem permanently. On 31 August 2021, Al-Barakah was loaned out to Al-Fayha. On 9 September 2023, Al-Barakah joined Al-Bukiryah once again.

== Honours ==
Al-Hazem

- MS League: 2020–21

Al-Fayha

- King Cup: 2021–22
