= Abdullah Khattab =

Saudi Arabian footballer

Personal information
- Full name: Abdullah Bilal Khattab
- Date of birth: November 9, 1994 (age 32)
- Place of birth: Mecca, Saudi Arabia
- Height: 1.72 m (5 ft 7 1/2 in)
- Position: Winger

Team information
- Current team: Al-Washm
- Number: 88

Youth career
- Al-Wehda

Senior career*
Years	Team	Apps	(Gls)
2016–2018	Al-Wehda	12	(2)
2018–2020	Al-Nojoom		
2020–2022	Damac	2	(0)
2020	→ Al-Mujazzal (loan)	17	(2)
2020–2021	→ Al-Adalah (loan)	26	(7)
2022	Al-Jabalain	15	(1)
2022–2023	Al-Qaisumah	25	(1)
2023–2024	Hajer	30	(3)
2024–2025	Al-Najma	16	(1)
2025–	Al-Washm	0	(0)
- * Club domestic league appearances and goals as of 20 September 2020

Abdullah Khattab (Arabic: عبد الله خطاب; born 9 November 1994) is a Saudi football player who currently plays as a winger for Al-Washm.

On 7 October 2020, Khattab joined Al-Adalah on loan. On 25 June 2023, Khattab joined Hajer. On 19 July 2024, Khattab joined Al-Najma. On 21 September 2025, Khattab joined Al-Washm.
