= Khalid Al-Dubaysh =

Saudi association football player

Personal information
- Full name: Khalid Hussain Al-Dubaysh
- Date of birth: November 27, 1998 (age 27)
- Place of birth: Riyadh, Saudi Arabia
- Height: 1.78 m (5 ft 10 in)
- Position: Left back

Team information
- Current team: Arar

Youth career
- –2017: Al-Nassr

Senior career*
Years	Team	Apps	(Gls)
2017–2020	Al-Nassr	0	(0)
2018–2019	→ Al-Shoulla (loan)	1	(0)
2019–2020	→ Al-Adalah (loan)	6	(0)
2020–2022	Al-Shabab	3	(0)
2022	Damac	3	(0)
2022–2023	Al-Ain	4	(0)
2024–2025	Bisha	20	(0)
2026–	Arar	1	(0)

International career
2017–2018	Saudi Arabia U20		
2019–2021	Saudi Arabia U23		
- * Club domestic league appearances and goals as of 30 May 2021

Khalid Al-Dubaysh (Arabic: خالد الدبيش; born 27 November 1998) is a Saudi professional footballer who plays for Arar as a left-back.

== Career ==
Al-Dubaish started his career with Al-Nassr where he was promoted from the youth team to the first team, On 2017.he joined Al-Shoulla on a season-long loan. On 25 August 2019, Al-Dubaish signed a contract with Al-Adalah. On 2 October, Al-Dubaish signed a contract with Al-Shabab. On 27 January 2022, Al-Dubaysh joined Damac. On 5 September 2022, Al-Dubaysh joined Al-Ain.
