= Ayman Al-Hujaili =

Saudi Arabian association football player

Ayman Al-Hujaili أيمن الحجيلي
Personal information
- Full name: Ayman Yousef Al-Hujaili
- Date of birth: 1 July 1998 (age 28)
- Place of birth: Medina, Saudi Arabia
- Height: 1.65 m (5 ft 5 in)
- Position: Attacking midfielder

Team information
- Current team: Al-Orobah
- Number: 10

Youth career
- –2017: Al-Ansar

Senior career*
| Years | Team | Apps | (Gls) |
| 2017–2018 | Al-Ansar | | (2) |
| 2018 | Al-Nassr | 0 | (0) |
| 2018–2019 | Al-Ansar | 26 | (3) |
| 2019–2022 | Damac | 23 | (0) |
| 2021–2022 | → Al-Ain (loan) | 35 | (10) |
| 2022–2023 | Al-Khaleej | 16 | (0) |
| 2023–2024 | Al-Faisaly | 17 | (1) |
| 2024–2025 | Al-Adalah | 27 | (2) |
| 2025– | Al-Orobah | 0 | (0) |

International career
- Saudi Arabia U23
- * Club domestic league appearances and goals as of 28 May 2024

Ayman Al-Hujaili (Arabic: أيمن الحجيلي; born 1 July 1998) is a Saudi Arabian professional footballer who plays as an attacking-midfielder for Al-Orobah.

== Career ==
Ayman Al-Hujaili started his career at the youth teams of hometown club Al-Ansar. On 10 January 2018, Al-Nassr signed Al-Hujaili and Mohammed Al-Shanqiti for a reported fee of SAR600,000. On 1 July 2018, Al-Hujaili returned to Al-Ansar on a free transfer. On 10 July 2019, Damac signed Al-Hujaili on a three-year deal from Al-Ansar. On 3 September 2021, Al-Hujaili joined Al-Ain on loan. On 13 July 2022, Al-Hujaili joined Al-Khaleej on a two-year deal. On 25 July 2023, Al-Hujaili joined Al-Faisaly. On 23 June 2024, Al-Hujaili joined Al-Adalah. In September 2025, Al-Hujaili joined Al-Orobah.
