= Moustapha Zeghba =

Algerian footballer (born 1990)

Personal information
- Full name: Moustapha Zeghba
- Date of birth: 21 November 1990 (age 35)
- Place of birth: M'Sila, Algeria
- Height: 1.90 m (6 ft 3 in)
- Position: Goalkeeper

Team information
- Current team: MC Oran
- Number: 1

Senior career*
Years	Team	Apps	(Gls)
2010–2011	WR M'Sila		
2011–2013	MC El Eulma		
2013–2015	A Bou Saâda		
2015–2017	USM El Harrach	33	(0)
2017–2019	ES Sétif	44	(0)
2019–2020	Al-Wehda	11	(0)
2020–2024	Damac	112	(1)
2024–2026	CR Belouizdad	26	(0)
2026–	MC Oran	18	(0)

International career
2018–2024	Algeria	8	(0)
Medal record
Men's
Representing Algeria
FIFA Arab Cup
Winner	2021 Qatar
- * Club domestic league appearances and goals as of 23 October 2026

Moustapha Zeghba (Arabic: مصطفى زغبة; born 21 November 1990) is an Algerian professional association football goalkeeper for MC Oran and the Algeria national team.

== Club career ==
On 29 January 2026, he joined MC Oran.

== International career ==
Zeghba represented Algeria at the 2021 FIFA Arab Cup, debuting in a 2–0 win in the tournament against Lebanon on 4 December 2021.

== Honours ==
Algeria

- FIFA Arab Cup: 2021

Individual

- Saudi Professional League Goalkeeper of the Month: September 2021, December 2022
