= Mazen Abu Shararah =

Saudi Arabian football player

Personal information
- Full name: Mazen Ali Abu Shararah
- Date of birth: 27 February 1991 (age 35)
- Place of birth: Saudi Arabia
- Height: 1.76 m (5 ft 9 1/2 in)
- Position: Forward

Senior career*
Years	Team	Apps	(Gls)
2013–2014	Al-Nahda	11	(1)
2014–2018	Al-Qadsiah	80	(9)
2018–2019	Al-Raed	9	(1)
2019–2022	Damac	39	(3)
2020	→ Al-Ahli (loan)	8	(0)
2022–2023	Al-Qadsiah	5	(0)
2023–2024	Al-Jeel		
- * Club domestic league appearances and goals

Mazen Abu Shararah (Arabic: مازن أبو شرارة, born 27 February 1991) is a Saudi Arabian football player who currently plays as forward.
