= Hassan Al-Shamrani =

Saudi Arabian footballer (born 1992)

Hassan Al-Shamrani حسن الشمراني
Personal information
- Full name: Hassan Ahmed Al-Shamrani
- Date of birth: 16 November 1992 (age 33)
- Place of birth: Saudi Arabia
- Height: 1.85 m (6 ft 1 in)
- Position: Defender

Youth career
- Al-Ittihad
- Al-Wehda

Senior career*
Years	Team	Apps	(Gls)
2015–2016	Al-Diriyah		
2016–2017	Al-Qaisumah	28	(1)
2017–2018	Al-Orobah	1	(0)
2018–2019	Al-Nojoom	32	(1)
2019–2020	Al-Nahda		
2020–2024	Damac	39	(0)
2020–2021	→ Al-Tai (loan)	34	(3)
2024–2025	Al-Diriyah	0	(0)
- * Club domestic league appearances and goals as of 27 May 2024

Hassan Al-Shamrani (Arabic: حسن الشمراني; born 16 November 1992) is a Saudi Arabian professional footballer who plays as a defender and last played Al-Diriyah.

== Career ==
Al-Shamrani began his career at the youth team of Al-Ittihad before leaving to join Al-Wehda. On 8 August 2015, Al-Shamrani joined First Division side Al-Diriyah. On 24 August 2016, Al-Shamrani joined Al-Qaisumah. In July 2017, Al-Shamrani joined Al-Orobah. On 17 August 2018, Al-Shamarani joined Al-Nojoom. On 3 July 2019, Al-Shamrani joined Al-Nahda. On 31 January 2020, Al-Shmarani joined Pro League Damac. On 28 October 2020, Al-Shamrani joined Al-Tai on loan. On 24 July 2024, Al-Shamrani joined Al-Diriyah.
