= Ibrahim Al-Nakhli =

Saudi Arabian footballer

Ibrahim Al-Nakhli إبراهيم النخلي
Personal information
- Full name: Ibrahim Hussain Al-Nakhli
- Date of birth: 9 March 1997 (age 29)
- Place of birth: Medina, Saudi Arabia
- Height: 1.76 m (5 ft 9 in)
- Position: Defender

Team information
- Current team: Al-Tai
- Number: 88

Youth career
- –2017: Al-Fateh

Senior career*
Years	Team	Apps	(Gls)
2017–2018	Al-Fateh	0	(0)
2018–2020	Al-Thoqbah	39	(2)
2020–2023	Damac	57	(1)
2023–	Al-Tai	29	(1)
- * Club domestic league appearances and goals as of 11 May 2024

Ibrahim Al-Nakhli (Arabic: إبراهيم النخلي; born 9 March 1997) is a Saudi Arabian professional footballer who plays as a defender for Saudi Professional League side Al-Tai.

== Career ==
Al-Nakhli started his career at the youth team of Al-Fateh and represented the club at every level. On 1 October 2020, Al-Nakhli joined Al-Thoqbah. On 20 July 2019, Al-Nakhli renew his contract with Al-Thoqbah. On 25 September 2020, Al-Nakhli joined Damac. On 15 July 2023, Al-Nakhli joined Al-Tai on a three-year deal.
