= Bader Munshi =

Saudi Arabian footballer (born 1999)

Personal information
- Full name: Bader Mohammed Yousef Munshi
- Date of birth: 22 June 1999 (age 27)
- Place of birth: Jeddah, Saudi Arabia
- Height: 1.73 m (5 ft 8 in)
- Position: Midfielder

Team information
- Current team: Al-Khaleej
- Number: 16

Youth career
- –2018: Al-Ahli

Senior career*
Years	Team	Apps	(Gls)
2018–2020	Al-Ahli	0	(0)
2020–2021	Al-Kawkab	8	(0)
2021–2024	Damac	65	(0)
2024–2026	Al-Diriyah	25	(0)
2026–	Al-Khaleej	0	(0)

International career^{‡}
2021–2022	Saudi Arabia U23		
2021–	Saudi Arabia	1	(0)
- * Club domestic league appearances and goals as of 27 May 2024 ‡ National team caps and goals as of 1 December 2021

Bader Mohammed Yousef Munshi (Arabic: بدر محمد يوسف منشي, born 22 June 1999) is a Saudi Arabian professional footballer who plays as a midfielder for Al-Khaleej.

== Career ==
Munshi started his career at the youth team of Al-Ahli. On 25 August 2019, Munshi signed his first professional contract with the club. On 11 October 2020, Munshi was released from his contract by the club. on 31 October 2020, Munshi joined First Division League side Al-Kawkab. On 28 January 2021, Munshi joined Pro League side Damac. On 2 September 2024, Munshi joined Saudi Second Division League club Al-Diriyah. On 24 January 2026, Munshi joined Al-Khaleej.
