= Abdulelah Al-Barrih =

Saudi Arabian footballer

Abdulelah Al-Barrih عبدالإله البريه
Personal information
- Full name: Abdulelah Abdullah Al-Barrih
- Date of birth: 14 July 1997 (age 29)
- Place of birth: Saudi Arabia
- Height: 1.78 m (5 ft 10 in)
- Position: Midfielder

Team information
- Current team: Jeddah
- Number: 10

Youth career
- 2016–2018: Al-Hilal

Senior career*
Years	Team	Apps	(Gls)
2018–2019	Al-Washm	26	(2)
2019–2020	Al-Nojoom	30	(3)
2020–2022	Damac	14	(0)
2021	→ Al-Tai (loan)	18	(0)
2022–2024	Al-Batin	35	(6)
2025–	Jeddah		
- * Club domestic league appearances and goals as of 10 April 2023

Abdulelah Al-Barrih (Arabic: عبدالإله البريه; born 14 July 1997) is a Saudi Arabian professional footballer who plays as a midfielder for Jeddah.

== Career ==
On 4 October 2016, Al-Barrih signed with Al-Hilal's under-23 team. On 5 September 2018, Al-Barrih joined Al-Washm. On 27 July 2019, Al-Barrih joined Al-Nojoom. On 3 October 2020, Al-Barrih joined Damac on a three-year contract. On 31 January 2021, he joined Al-Tai on a six-month loan. On 18 August 2022, Al-Barrih joined Al-Batin on a two-year deal. On 8 September 2025, Al-Barrih joined Jeddah.
