= Krešimir Režić =

Croatian football manager (born 1981)

Personal information
- Full name: Krešimir Režić
- Date of birth: 13 October 1981 (age 45)
- Place of birth: Split, SR Croatia, Yugoslavia

Senior career*
Years	Team	Apps	(Gls)
- Solin

Managerial career
- 2013–2014: Hajduk Split U13
- 2014–2015: Hajduk Split U14
- 2015–2016: Hajduk Split U15
- 2016–2017: Hajduk Split U17
- 2017: RNK Split U19s
- 2017–2018: Al-Nassr U15s
- 2019–2020: Croatia Zmijavci
- 2020–2021: Damac U19s
- 2021–2023: Damac
- 2023: Al-Tai
- 2025: Al-Raed
- 2026: Istra 1961
- 2026–: Khor Fakkan
- * Club domestic league appearances and goals

Krešimir Režić (born 13 October 1981) is a Croatian association football manager and former player, most recently in charge of Croatian club NK Istra 1961.

Režić spend his playing career at lower division clubs, before working for a number of years as academy coach at Hajduk Split. At senior level, Režić had spells managing Saudi Pro League clubs Damac, Al-Tai and Al-Raed.

== Career ==
Krešimir Režić was born in Split on 13 October 1981. As a player, Režić played for NK Došk, NK Solin, and NK Jadran Supetar. He worked at Hajduk Split's youth academy from 2007 until 2017, and from 2013 until 2014 he was the assistant manager of Mladen Ivančić in the Croatia U17 national team.

In the summer of 2017, Režić joined Saudi Arabian club Al-Nassr to manage their U15 team. In the summer of 2019, Režić took the reins of the newly promoted 2.HNL side Croatia Zmijavci. In June 2020, after finishing the season in second place, he left the club by mutual consent. On 14 September 2020, Režić joined Saudi Arabian club Damac to manage their U19 team. On 12 January 2021, Režić was named as first-team manager following the sacking of Noureddine Zekri. In his first season at the club, Režić managed to lead the club to safety and finish in eleventh. During the 2021–22 season, Režić was awarded the manager of the month award for September after leading the club to second place. On 21 December 2021, Režić renewed his contract with Damac until the end of the 2022–23 season. On 6 March 2023, Režić was sacked by Damac after a 2–1 loss to Al-Taawoun.

On 24 May 2023, Režić was appointed as the manager of Al-Tai. After 7 games in charge, Režić was sacked by Al-Tai on 25 September 2023.

== Managerial statistics ==
As of match played 25 September 2023

Managerial record by team and tenure
Team	Nat	From	To	Record							
Team	Nat	From	To	G	W	D	L	GF	GA	GD	Win %
Croatia Zmijavci	(Croatia)	1 July 2019	16 June 2020	19	10	3	6	28	17	+11	52.63
Damac	(Saudi Arabia)	4 January 2021	6 March 2023	70	24	22	24	88	99	−11	34.29
Al-Tai	(Saudi Arabia)	1 June 2023	25 September 2023	7	2	1	4	6	12	−6	28.57
Al-Raed	(Saudi Arabia)	1 April 2025	1 June 2025	10	1	0	9	13	21	−8	10.00
Total				106	37	26	43	135	149	−14	34.91

== Honours ==
Individual

- Saudi Professional League Manager of the Month: September 2021
