= Arif Al Haydar =

Saudi Arabian footballer (born 1997)

Arif Al Haydar عارف آل حيدر
Personal information
- Full name: Arif Saleh Al Haydar
- Date of birth: 20 June 1997 (age 29)
- Place of birth: Najran, Saudi Arabia
- Height: 1.73 m (5 ft 8 in)
- Positions: Right-back; winger

Senior career*
Years	Team	Apps	(Gls)
2018–2020	Najran	44	(9)
2020–2022	Damac	24	(0)
2022–2023	Al-Adalah	24	(1)
2023–2026	Al-Khaleej	33	(0)
- * Club domestic league appearances and goals as of 11 April 2023

Arif Al Haydar (Arabic: عارف آل حيدر; born 20 June 1997) is a Saudi Arabian professional footballer who plays as a right winger or a right back.

== Career ==
On 1 August 2018, Al Haydar joined Najran. He spent 2 seasons at the club and made 44 league appearances and scored 9 goals. On 3 October 2020, he joined Damac on a three-year deal. On 24 July 2022, Al Haydar joined the newly promoted Pro League side Al-Adalah on a free transfer following his release from Damac. On 31 August 2023, he joined Al-Khaleej on a one-year deal.
