= Sergio Vittor =

Argentine footballer

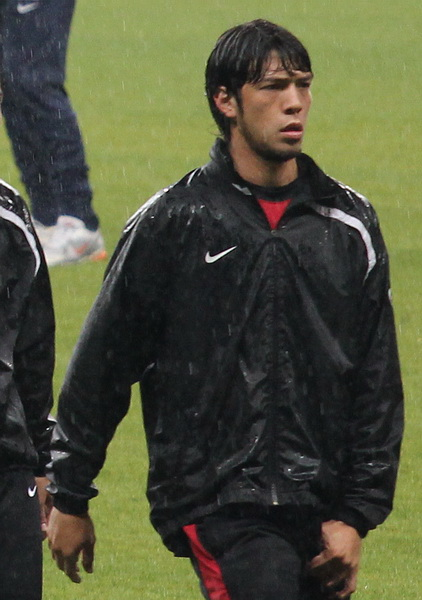

Personal information
- Full name: Sergio Javier Vittor
- Date of birth: 9 July 1989 (age 37)
- Place of birth: La Plata, Buenos Aires, Argentina
- Height: 1.89 m (6 ft 2 1/2 in)
- Position: Centre back

Team information
- Current team: Chacarita Juniors

Youth career
- Independiente

Senior career*
Years	Team	Apps	(Gls)
2008–2012	Independiente	29	(0)
2010	→ Žilina (loan)	5	(1)
2011–2012	→ Gimnasia LP (loan)	18	(1)
2012–2013	Gimnasia de Jujuy	27	(0)
2014–2015	Atlético de Rafaela	19	(3)
2015–2016	Banfield	27	(3)
2016–2020	Racing Club	38	(2)
2018	→ Universidad de Concepción(loan)	24	(2)
2019	→ Universidad de Chile (loan)	8	(0)
2019–2020	→ Banfield (loan)	14	(1)
2020	→ Damac (loan)	17	(1)
2020–2022	Damac	51	(4)
2022–2023	Al-Sailiya	22	(1)
2023–2024	Qadsia SC		
2024–2025	Kuwait SC		
2025–2026	Banfield	28	(0)
2026–	Chacarita Juniors	10	(0)
- * Club domestic league appearances and goals as of 18:01, 3 October 2026 (UTC)

Sergio Javier Vittor (born 9 July 1989) is an Argentine football defender who currently plays for Chacarita Juniors .
