= Mansour Hamzi =

Saudi Arabian footballer (born 1992)

Personal information
- Full name: Mansour Hamzi
- Date of birth: 17 January 1992 (age 34)
- Place of birth: Jizan, Saudi Arabia
- Height: 1.73 m (5 ft 8 in)
- Position: Winger

Team information
- Current team: Al-Khaleej
- Number: 15

Youth career
- Al-Yarmouk

Senior career*
Years	Team	Apps	(Gls)
2013–2018	Al-Faisaly	84	(9)
2018–2019	Al-Fateh	27	(2)
2019–2020	Al-Hazem	26	(2)
2020–2023	Damac	84	(10)
2023–	Al-Khaleej	60	(3)

International career^{‡}
2019–	Saudi Arabia	3	(0)
- * Club domestic league appearances and goals as of 20:16, 2 May 2025 (UTC) ‡ National team caps and goals as of 21:32, 10 August 2019 (UTC)

Mansour Hamzi (Arabic: منصور حمزي, born 17 January 1992) is a Saudi Arabian professional footballer who plays as a winger for Saudi Professional League club Al-Khaleej. He scored the first hat-trick in the first match of Saudi Professional League in the 2016–17 season

== Career ==
On 17 July 2019, Hamzi joined Al-Hazem on a three-year deal.

On 25 October 2020, Hamzi joined Damac. On 18 January 2022, Hamzi renewed his contract with the club.

On 4 August 2023, Hamzi joined Al-Khaleej on a two-year deal.
