= Abdulaziz Al-Shahrani =

Saudi Arabian footballer (1994–2026)

Abdulaziz Al-Shahrani عبدالعزيز الشهراني
Personal information
- Full name: Abdulaziz Saeed Al Sarhan Al-Shahrani
- Date of birth: 30 October 1994
- Place of birth: Abha, Saudi Arabia
- Date of death: 17 October 2026 (aged 31)
- Height: 1.73 m (5 ft 8 in)
- Position: Attacking midfielder

Youth career
- Abha

Senior career*
Years	Team	Apps	(Gls)
2015–2017	Abha		
2017–2019	Damac	32	(6)
2019–2020	Al-Ahli	0	(0)
2019–2020	→ Damac (loan)	15	(0)
2020–2024	Damac	50	(3)
2022	→ Ohod (loan)	15	(1)
2024–2026	Al-Diriyah		
- * Club domestic league appearances and goals

Abdulaziz Al-Shahrani (Arabic: عبدالعزيز الشهراني; 30 October 1994 – 17 October 2026) was a Saudi Arabian professional footballer who played as an attacking midfielder.

== Career ==
Al-Shahrani played mostly as an attacking midfielder, but can also be deployed as a winger. He began his senior career as a member of his hometown club Abha in the Saudi Second Division, departing two seasons later to join local rivals and Saudi First Division club Damac. He made his debut for the first team on 13 September 2017 in the league match against Al-Nahda coming off the bench in the 53rd minute. He scored his first goal for the club in the same match, bringing the score level in the 55th minute. On 22 January 2018, Al-Shahrani ruptured his ACL was ruled out for the remainder of the 2017–18 season. He ended his first season at the club making fourteen appearances and scoring three goals. He made his return to the first team in the first match of the 2018–19 season against his former club Abha. In his second season at the club, Al-Shahrani made eighteen appearances and scored three goals before leaving the club mid-season.

On 22 January 2019, Al-Shahrani signed a four-year contract with Pro League club Al-Ahli. After making no appearances for Al-Ahli, Al-Shahrani rejoined Damac on loan until the end of the 2019–20 season. On 23 October 2020, Al-Shahrani joined Damac on a permanent deal. On 27 January 2022, Al-Shahrani joined Ohod on loan until the end of the 2021–22 season. On 20 July 2024, Al-Shahrani joined Al-Diriyah.

== Death ==
Al-Shahrani died on 17 October 2026, at the age of 31, after sustaining injuries during a traffic collision.
