= 2024–25 Damac FC season =

Damac
2024–25 season
- President: Khaled Al Masha'at
- Manager: Cosmin Contra (until 6 December); Nuno Almeida (from 25 December until 26 March); Khaled Al-Atwi (from 27 March)
- Stadium: Prince Sultan bin Abdul Aziz Stadium; Damac Club Stadium
- Pro League: 14th
- King's Cup: Round of 32 (knocked out by Al-Najma)
- Top goalscorer: League: Georges-Kévin Nkoudou (13); All: Georges-Kévin Nkoudou (13)
- Highest home attendance: 15,066 v Al-Hilal; 8 February 2025; Saudi Pro League
- Lowest home attendance: 632 v Al-Kholood; 24 November 2024; Saudi Pro League
- Average home league attendance: 5,022

The 2024–25 season was Damac's 53rd year in their history and sixth consecutive season in the Pro League. The club participated in the Pro League and the King's Cup.

The season covers the period from 1 July 2024 to 30 June 2025.

== Players ==
=== Squad information ===
As of 1 February 2025

Note: Flags indicate national team as defined under FIFA eligibility rules; some limited exceptions apply. Players may hold more than one non-FIFA nationality.

No.	Pos.	Nation	Player
1	GK	ROU	Florin Niță
3	DF	ALG	Abdelkader Bedrane
4	DF	KSA	Noor Al-Rashidi
5	DF	KSA	Tareq Abdullah
6	MF	KSA	Faisal Al-Sibyani (on loan from Al-Ahli)
7	MF	KSA	Abdullah Al-Qahtani
8	MF	EGY	Tarek Hamed
10	MF	CMR	Georges-Kévin Nkoudou
11	MF	GUI	François Kamano
12	DF	KSA	Sanousi Hawsawi
13	DF	KSA	Abdulrahman Al-Obaid
15	DF	ALG	Farouk Chafaï (captain)
17	FW	KSA	Abdullah Al-Mogren (on loan from Al-Fateh)
18	MF	KSA	Ahmed Harisi

No.	Pos.	Nation	Player
20	DF	KSA	Dhari Al-Anazi
21	GK	KSA	Yahya Abu Dahi
22	GK	KSA	Abdulbassit Hawsawi
23	DF	KSA	Jawad Al-Qahtani
24	MF	KSA	Hassan Abu Sharara
30	GK	KSA	Nasser Al-Ghamdi
32	MF	ROU	Nicolae Stanciu
51	DF	KSA	Ramzi Solan
80	FW	SEN	Habib Diallo (on loan from Al-Shabab)
87	DF	KSA	Mohammed Al-Khaibari (on loan from Al-Khaleej)
90	MF	KSA	Hazzaa Al-Ghamdi
94	FW	KSA	Meshari Al-Nemer (on loan from Al-Nassr)
95	MF	KSA	Ayman Fallatah (on loan from Al-Ahli)
97	GK	KSA	Amin Bukhari (on loan from Al-Nassr)

== Transfers and loans ==
=== Transfers in ===
Entry date	Position	No.	Player	From club	Fee	Ref.
30 June 2024	MF	6	(Netherlands) Adam Maher	(Qatar) Al-Wakrah	End of loan	
30 June 2024	MF	24	(Saudi Arabia) Hassan Abu Sharara	(Saudi Arabia) Al-Jabalain	End of loan	
30 June 2024	MF	79	(Saudi Arabia) Fares Al-Shahrani	(Saudi Arabia) Jerash	End of loan	
30 June 2024	FW	–	(Saudi Arabia) Rayan Al-Qahtani	(Saudi Arabia) Jerash	End of loan	
23 August 2024	GK	30	(Saudi Arabia) Nasser Al-Ghamdi	(Saudi Arabia) Al-Ain	Free	
23 August 2024	MF	90	(Saudi Arabia) Hazzaa Al-Ghamdi	(Saudi Arabia) Al-Wehda	Free	
23 August 2024	FW	11	(Guinea) François Kamano	(Saudi Arabia) Abha	Free	
25 August 2024	GK	1	(Romania) Florin Niță	(Turkey) Gaziantep	Free	
1 September 2024	DF	5	(Saudi Arabia) Tareq Abdullah	(Saudi Arabia) Al-Tai	Free	
3 September 2024	FW	19	(Saudi Arabia) Thamer Al-Ali	(Saudi Arabia) Al-Wehda	Free	

=== Loans in ===
Start date	End date	Position	No.	Player	From club	Fee	Ref.
23 August 2024	End of season	FW	17	(Saudi Arabia) Abdullah Al-Mogren	(Saudi Arabia) Al-Fateh	None	
26 August 2024	End of season	FW	80	(Senegal) Habib Diallo	(Saudi Arabia) Al-Shabab	None	
29 August 2024	End of season	MF	95	(Saudi Arabia) Ayman Fallatah	(Saudi Arabia) Al-Ahli	None	
2 September 2024	End of season	MF	6	(Saudi Arabia) Faisal Al-Sibyani	(Saudi Arabia) Al-Ahli	None	
2 September 2024	End of season	FW	94	(Saudi Arabia) Meshari Al-Nemer	(Saudi Arabia) Al-Nassr	None	
3 September 2024	End of season	GK	97	(Saudi Arabia) Amin Bukhari	(Saudi Arabia) Al-Nassr	None	
3 September 2024	End of season	DF	87	(Saudi Arabia) Mohammed Al-Khaibari	(Saudi Arabia) Al-Khaleej	None	

=== Transfers out ===
Exit date	Position	No.	Player	To club	Fee	Ref.
30 June 2024	MF	11	(Saudi Arabia) Abdulaziz Al-Bishi	(Saudi Arabia) Al-Ittihad	End of loan	
13 July 2024	DF	19	(Saudi Arabia) Abdullah Hawsawi	(Saudi Arabia) Al-Kholood	Free	
19 July 2024	MF	12	(Saudi Arabia) Abdulaziz Makin	(Saudi Arabia) Al-Faisaly	Free	
20 July 2024	MF	14	(Saudi Arabia) Abdulaziz Al-Shahrani	(Saudi Arabia) Al-Diriyah	Free	
24 July 2024	DF	40	(Saudi Arabia) Hassan Al-Shamrani	(Saudi Arabia) Al-Diriyah	Free	
31 July 2024	GK	30	(Algeria) Moustapha Zeghba	(Algeria) CR Belouizdad	Free	
1 August 2024	MF	49	(Saudi Arabia) Ahmed Al-Zain	(Saudi Arabia) Al-Ula	Free	
13 August 2024	GK	–	(Saudi Arabia) Sayyaf Dubais	(Saudi Arabia) Jerash	Free	
16 August 2024	GK	1	(Saudi Arabia) Bandar Al-Shahrani	(Saudi Arabia) Al-Ain	Free	
22 August 2024	MF	23	(Saudi Arabia) Abdulaziz Majrashi	(Saudi Arabia) Al-Jabalain	Free	
22 August 2024	FW	99	(Saudi Arabia) Fahad Al-Johani	(Saudi Arabia) Al-Jabalain	Free	
29 August 2024	MF	17	(Croatia) Domagoj Antolić	(Croatia) Lokomotiva Zagreb	Free	
2 September 2024	DF	14	(Saudi Arabia) Sultan Faqihi	(Saudi Arabia) Al-Arabi	Free	
2 September 2024	MF	16	(Saudi Arabia) Bader Munshi	(Saudi Arabia) Al-Diriyah	Undisclosed	
7 October 2024	MF	79	(Saudi Arabia) Fares Al-Shahrani	(Saudi Arabia) Sharurah	Free	
1 February 2025	FW	19	(Saudi Arabia) Thamer Al-Ali	(Saudi Arabia) Abha	Free	

== Pre-season ==
23 July 2024 Friendly	Damac (Saudi Arabia)	3–2	(Romania) Reșița	Gornja Radgona, Slovenia
18:00 CEST	Nkoudou 8'; Solan 47', 79'	Report	Lascu; Angelov	Stadium: TŠC Trate

29 July 2024 Friendly	Damac (Saudi Arabia)	1–2	(United Arab Emirates) Ittihad Kalba	Gornja Radgona, Slovenia
16:00 CEST	Solan 10'	Report	Bessa 23'; Al-Blooshi 67'	Stadium: TŠC Trate

31 July 2024 Friendly	Damac (Saudi Arabia)	1–0	(Slovenia) Drava Ptuj	Gornja Radgona, Slovenia
18:00 CEST		Report		Stadium: TŠC Trate

3 August 2024 Friendly	Damac (Saudi Arabia)	0–0	(Saudi Arabia) Al-Taawoun	Gornja Radgona, Slovenia
16:00 CEST		Report		Stadium: TŠC Trate

6 August 2024 Friendly	Damac (Saudi Arabia)	3–1	(United Arab Emirates) Al-Bataeh	Gornja Radgona, Slovenia
16:00 CEST	Nkoudou 39', 87'; Bedrane 82'	Report	12'	Stadium: TŠC Trate

15 August 2024 Friendly	Damac (Saudi Arabia)	2–1	(Saudi Arabia) Abha	Khamis Mushait, Saudi Arabia
19:15 AST	Stanciu; Nkoudou	Report		Stadium: Damac Club Stadium

== Competitions ==
=== Overview ===
Competition	Record							
Competition	Pld	W	D	L	GF	GA	GD	Win %
Pro League	34	9	8	17	37	50	−13	26.47
King's Cup	1	0	0	1	0	2	−2	0.00
Total	35	9	8	18	37	52	−15	25.71

Updated to match played 26 May 2025
Source: Competitions

=== Pro League ===
==== League table ====
Pos	Team	Pld	W	D	L	GF	GA	GD	Pts	Qualification or relegation
12	Al-Khaleej	34	10	7	17	40	57	−17	37	
13	Al-Fayha	34	8	12	14	27	49	−22	36	
14	Damac	34	9	8	17	37	50	−13	35	
15	Al-Okhdood	34	9	7	18	33	56	−23	34	
16	Al-Wehda (R)	34	9	6	19	42	67	−25	33	Relegation to First Division League

Source: SPL
Rules for classification: 1) Points; 2) Head-to-head points; 3) Head-to-head goal difference; 4) Total goal difference; 5) Total goals scored; 6) Fair-play points
(Note: Head-to-head record is used only after all the matches between the teams in question have been played).
(R) Relegated

==== Results summary ====
Overall								Home						Away					
Pld	W	D	L	GF	GA	GD	Pts	W	D	L	GF	GA	GD	W	D	L	GF	GA	GD
34	9	8	17	37	50	−13	35	6	4	7	21	24	−3	3	4	10	16	26	−10

Last updated: 26 May 2025.
Source: Saudi Pro League

==== Results by round ====
Round	1	2	3	4	5	6	7	8	9	10	11	12	13	14	15	16	17	18	19	20	21	22	23	24	25	26	27	28	29	30	31	32	33	34
Ground	H	A	H	A	A	H	H	A	H	A	H	A	H	A	H	A	H	A	H	A	H	H	A	A	H	A	H	A	H	A	H	A	H	A
Result	L	L	W	L	L	W	D	L	D	W	W	L	D	W	L	L	W	D	D	D	L	L	L	L	W	D	L	W	L	L	W	D	L	L
Position	15	14	12	15	17	13	12	13	14	10	11	11	10	10	10	10	10	10	11	11	12	12	13	13	12	12	13	11	11	13	10	12	14	14

Updated to match(es) played on 26 May 2025. Source: Saudi Pro League
A = Away; H = Home; W = Win; D = Draw; L = Loss

==== Matches ====
All times are local, AST (UTC+3).

Win Draw Loss Postponed

23 August 2024 1	Damac	0–1	Al-Khaleej	Khamis Mushait
19:10	Nkoudou (yellow card) 20'; Al-Anazi (yellow card) 77'	Report	Al-Anazi 16' (o.g.); Al Hamsal (yellow card) 66'; Al Dubais (yellow card) 72'; Šehić (yellow card) 90+3'	Stadium: Damac Club Stadium; Attendance: 2,677; Referee: Abdullah Al-Kharboush

28 August 2024 2	Al-Hilal	3–2	Damac	Riyadh
21:00	Mitrović 45+5', 84'; Neves (yellow card) 63'; Al-Juwayr 73'; Lodi (yellow card) 86'	Report	Stanciu (yellow card) 38'; Kamano 49'; Diallo 53'; Solan (yellow card) 58'; Al-Anazi (yellow card) 76'	Stadium: Prince Faisal bin Fahd Sports City; Attendance: 8,989; Referee: István Kovács (Romania)

13 September 2024 3	Damac	3–1	Al-Okhdood	Khamis Mushait
18:50	Al-Zabdani 6' (o.g.); Nkoudou 12', 28' (pen.); Al-Anazi (yellow card) 35'; Niță (yellow card) 72'	Report	Al-Rubaie (yellow card) 26'; Musona 73'; Al-Zabdani (yellow card) 90+4'	Stadium: Damac Club Stadium; Attendance: 3,065; Referee: Majed Al-Shamrani

20 September 2024 4	Al-Ahli	4–2	Damac	Jeddah
18:55	Veiga 13', (yellow card) 88'; Ibañez (yellow card) 30'; Al-Johani (yellow card) 30'; Toney 46', 90+16'; Firmino 90+8'	Report	Fallatah 45+9', (yellow card) 88'; Chafaï 65'; Al-Khaibari (yellow card) 90+5'	Stadium: King Abdullah Sports City; Attendance: 25,471; Referee: Abdullah Al-Harbi

28 September 2024 5	Al-Orobah	1–0	Damac	Sakakah
18:50	Guðmundsson (yellow card) 39'; Tello 45+4'; F. Al-Zubaidi (yellow card) 65'; Seri (yellow card) 75'; Al-Shammeri (yellow card) 90+6'; Coucke (yellow card) 90+9'	Report		Stadium: Al Jouf University Stadium; Attendance: 1,033; Referee: Mohammed Al-Hoaish

4 October 2024 6	Damac	1–0	Al-Shabab	Khamis Mushait
21:00	Chafaï (yellow card) 27'; Nkoudou 66'; Al-Anazi (yellow card) 90+3'	Report	Renan (yellow card) 7'; Bonaventura (yellow card) 63'; Kanabah (yellow card) 81'	Stadium: Damac Club Stadium; Attendance: 3,847; Referee: Abdullah Al-Kharboush

19 October 2024 7	Damac	2–2	Al-Taawoun	Khamis Mushait
18:20	Diallo 60', (yellow card) 81'; Nkoudou 77', (yellow card) 78'	Report	Barrow 27'; Girotto (yellow card) 80'; Adam (yellow card) 81', (goal) 85'; Al-Ahmed (yellow card) 90+3'; Flávio (yellow card) 90+10'	Stadium: Damac Club Stadium; Attendance: 3,015; Referee: Abdulsamad Bakri

25 October 2024 8	Al-Qadsiah	2–1	Damac	Dammam
17:35	Quiñones 39'; Nacho (yellow card) 50'; Hazazi (yellow card) 86'; Aubameyang 88'	Report	Abdullah (yellow card) 56'; Diallo 90+5'	Stadium: Prince Mohamed bin Fahd Stadium; Attendance: 9,634; Referee: Jesús Valenzuela (Venezuela)

1 November 2024 9	Damac	2–2	Al-Riyadh	Khamis Mushait
18:15	Stanciu (yellow card) 5'; Abdullah (yellow card) 17'; Diallo 42'; Al-Anazi (yellow card) 61'; Nkoudou 90+1' (pen.)	Report	Mensah 23'; Tambakti (yellow card) 45+2'; Assiri (yellow card) 46'; Selemani 68'	Stadium: Damac Club Stadium; Attendance: 2,576; Referee: Shukri Al-Hanfoush

9 November 2024 10	Al-Wehda	2–3	Damac	Mecca
18:15	Al-Hejji (yellow card) 5'; Al-Alaeli (yellow card) 20'; Bacuna (yellow card) 49'; Darwish 55'; Noor 88'	Report	Kamano 1', 51'; Al-Sibyani (yellow card) 68'; Nkoudou 83'; Niță (yellow card) 90+8'	Stadium: King Abdulaziz Sports City; Attendance: 518; Referee: Mohammed Al-Hoaish

24 November 2024 11	Damac	2–1	Al-Kholood	Abha
16:40	Nkoudou 24'; Solan (yellow card) 54' (yellow-red card) 71'; Chafaï 67'; Al-Anazi (yellow card) 74'; Fallatah (yellow card) 90+4'	Report	Muleka (yellow card) 7', (goal) 45+4'; Collado (yellow card) 21'; Al-Safri (yellow card) 51'	Stadium: Prince Sultan bin Abdulaziz Sports City; Attendance: 632; Referee: Mohammed Al-Ismail

29 November 2024 12	Al-Nassr	2–0	Damac	Riyadh
17:40	Ronaldo 17' (pen.), 79'; Mané (yellow card) 26'; Boushal (yellow card) 75'	Report	Hawsawi (yellow card) 36'; Bedrane (red card) 56'; Al-Anazi (yellow card) 76'; Al-Nemer (yellow card) 90+3'	Stadium: Al-Awwal Park; Attendance: 13,481; Referee: Benoît Bastien (France)

5 December 2024 13	Damac	2–2	Al-Fayha	Khamis Mushait
18:10	Nkoudou 6' (pen.); Kamano 67'; Abdullah (red card) 78'; Al-Khaibari (yellow card) 90+2'	Report	Al-Rashidi (yellow card) 3'; Cimirot (yellow card) 44'; Al-Baqawi (yellow card) 50'; Sakala 58'; Pozuelo 70'; Al-Duqayl (yellow card) 90+8'	Stadium: Damac Club Stadium; Attendance: 2,814; Referee: Raed Al-Zahrani

10 January 2025 14	Al-Raed	0–2	Damac	Buraidah
18:05		Report	Fallatah (yellow card) 41'; Stanciu 44'; Chafaï 90'	Stadium: King Abdullah Sports City; Attendance: 1,847; Referee: Mohammed Al-Smail

15 January 2025 15	Damac	0–3	Al-Ettifaq	Khamis Mushait
18:30	Bedrane (yellow card) 44'; Stanciu (yellow card) 69'; Solan (yellow card) 73'	Report	Dembélé 22', 45' (pen.); Abdulrahman (yellow card) 64'; Vitinho 83'; Al-Olayan (yellow card) 88'; Costa (yellow card) 90+5'	Stadium: Damac Club Stadium; Attendance: 2,813; Referee: Sultan Al-Harbi

22 January 2025 16	Al-Fateh	2–1	Damac	Al-Hasa
17:55	Bendebka 78' (pen.); Al-Othman (yellow card) 80'; Al-Daheem (yellow card) 90+9'; Batna 90+20'	Report	Chafaï (yellow card) 20'; Stanciu 69'; Al-Sibyani (yellow card) 90+7'	Stadium: Al-Fateh Club Stadium; Attendance: 3,097; Referee: Khaled Al-Teris

27 January 2025 17	Damac	2–1	Al-Ittihad	Abha
17:05	Nkoudou 17', 90+4', (yellow card) 87'; Al-Anazi (yellow card) 43'; Bedrane (yellow card) 79'; Niță (yellow card) 90+1'; Solan (yellow card) 90+3'	Report	Al-Aboud (yellow card) 34'; Benzema 45+4'; Aouar (yellow card) 76'	Stadium: Prince Sultan bin Abdulaziz Sports City; Attendance: 14,973; Referee: Faisal Al-Blwi

1 February 2025 18	Al-Khaleej	1–1	Damac	Dammam
16:25	Murg 43'; Al-Abdullah (yellow card) 90'	Report	Nkoudou 25'; Stanciu (yellow card) 45+3'; Chafaï (yellow card) 50'; Al-Khaibari (yellow card) 79'; H. Al-Ghamdi (yellow card) 90+6'	Stadium: Prince Mohamed bin Fahd Stadium; Attendance: 1,317; Referee: Abdullah Al-Kharbosh

8 February 2025 19	Damac	2–2	Al-Hilal	Abha
20:00	Al-Anazi (yellow card) 14'; Al-Sibyani (yellow card) 45+1'; Bedrane (yellow card) 45+3'; Diallo 50', 73'; Abdullah (yellow card) 90+7'	Report	Leonardo 32'; Al-Tombakti (yellow card) 45+3'; Neves (yellow card) 68'; Milinković-Savić 77'; Malcom (yellow card) 90+5'; Cancelo (yellow card) 90+7'	Stadium: Prince Sultan bin Abdulaziz Sports City; Attendance: 15,066; Referee: Sven Jablonski (Germany)

13 February 2025 20	Al-Okhdood	0–0	Damac	Najran
17:10	Hawsawi (yellow card) 45+5'; Petros (yellow card) 57'; Bassogog (yellow card) 63'; Al-Saeed (yellow card) 80'; Asiri (yellow card) 90+10'	Report	Al-Nemer (red card) 12'; Fallatah (yellow card) 87'	Stadium: Prince Hathloul bin Abdulaziz Sports City; Attendance: 781; Referee: Mohammed Al-Dagash

21 February 2025 21	Damac	0–2	Al-Ahli	Abha
16:00	Al-Rashidi (yellow card) 18'; Al-Khaibari (yellow card) 87'	Report	Toney 4'; Al-Muwallad (yellow card) 45+3'; Hamed (yellow card) 73'; Kessié (yellow card) 75'; Sulaiman (yellow card) 80'; Demiral (yellow card) 82'; Al-Rashidi (yellow card) 90+2'; Mahrez (yellow card) 90+3'; Galeno 90+5'	Stadium: Prince Sultan bin Abdulaziz Sports City; Attendance: 11,023; Referee: Donatas Rumšas (Lithuania)

24 February 2025 22	Damac	1–2	Al-Orobah	Khamis Mushait
18:50	Harisi (yellow card) 85'; Al-Nemer 90+10'	Report	Guðmundsson (yellow card) 45+2'; Young 48'; Al Somah 63'; Muhar (yellow card) 76'; F. Al-Zubaidi (yellow card) 81'	Stadium: Damac Club Stadium; Attendance: 2,593; Referee: Faisal Al-Blwi

28 February 2025 23	Al-Shabab	2–0	Damac	Riyadh
22:00	Leandrinho (yellow card) 49'; Guanca 61'; Al-Shuwayrikh 83'	Report	Chafaï (yellow card) 59'	Stadium: Al-Shabab Club Stadium; Attendance: 2,377; Referee: Khalid Al-Turais

8 March 2025 24	Al-Taawoun	3–0	Damac	Buraidah
22:00	Mandash 2'; Al-Abdulrazzaq (yellow card) 12'; Bahebri 23'; Chávez 37'; Al-Mufarrij (yellow card) 60'; Sabiri (yellow card) 74'	Report	Harisi (red card) 8'	Stadium: Al-Taawoun Club Stadium; Attendance: 2,666; Referee: Mohammed Al-Hoaish

14 March 2025 25	Damac	1–0	Al-Qadsiah	Khamis Mushait
22:00	Al-Rashidi (yellow card) 90+7'; Diallo 90+11'	Report	Quiñones (yellow card) 81'; Nández (yellow card) 90+4'; Al-Ammar (yellow card) 90+7'; Al-Othman (yellow card) 90+10'	Stadium: Damac Club Stadium; Attendance: 3,087; Referee: Nenad Minaković (Serbia)

5 April 2025 26	Al-Riyadh	0–0	Damac	Riyadh
17:15	Assiri (yellow card) 6'; Mensah (yellow card) 56'	Report	Al-Anazi (yellow card) 90+4'	Stadium: Prince Faisal bin Fahd Sports City Stadium; Attendance: 89; Referee: Abdullah Al-Harbi

10 April 2025 27	Damac	0–1	Al-Wehda	Khamis Mushait
19:00	Bedrane (yellow card) 9' (yellow-red card) 35'; Al-Obaid (yellow card) 40'	Report	El Yamiq (yellow card) 43'; Bacuna 52'; Bakshween (yellow card) 90+8'	Stadium: Damac Club Stadium; Attendance: 1,079; Referee: Sultan Al-Harbi

18 April 2025 28	Al-Kholood	1–3	Damac	Ar Rass
19:05	H. Al-Shamrani (yellow card) 28'; Maolida 51'; Hawsawi (yellow card) 54'	Report	Nkoudou 18' (pen.), 45' (pen.); Al-Anazi (yellow card) 33'; Stanciu 73'	Stadium: Al-Hazem Club Stadium; Attendance: 3,576; Referee: Mohammed Al-Hoaish

22 April 2025 29	Damac	2–3	Al-Nassr	Abha
21:00	Solan 18'; Al-Nemer (yellow card) 43'; Al-Sibyani (yellow card) 45+3'; Bedrane (yellow card) 56'; Stanciu 73'	Report	Laporte 25'; Al-Najdi (yellow card) 39'; Boushal (yellow card) 57'; Durán (yellow card) 65'; Al-Hassan 70'; Al-Ghannam (yellow card) 85', (goal) 90+4'	Stadium: Prince Sultan bin Abdulaziz Sports City; Attendance: 12,068; Referee: Tamás Bognár (Hungary)

2 May 2025 30	Al-Fayha	2–1	Damac	Al Majma'ah
19:05	K. Kaabi (yellow card) 45'; Al-Sahafi 47'; Al-Anazi 51' (o.g.); Al-Baqawi (yellow card) 53'; Shukurov (yellow card) 71'; Sakala (yellow card) 78'	Report	Stanciu 40'; Al-Khaibari (yellow card) 43'; Al-Rashidi (yellow card) 74'	Stadium: Al Majma'ah Sports City; Attendance: 1,910; Referee: Mohammed Al-Ismail

11 May 2025 31	Damac	1–0	Al-Raed	Khamis Mushait
19:10	Solan (yellow card) 34'; Hamed (yellow card) 43'; Al-Sibyani (yellow card) 45+5'; Al-Nemer 74'; Abdullah (yellow card) 90+8'	Report	Al-Jayzani (yellow card) 39'; Hawsawi (yellow card) 45+6'; Al-Rajeh (yellow card) 47'; El Berkaoui (yellow card) 70'	Stadium: Damac Club Stadium; Attendance: 1,428; Referee: Khalid Al-Turais

17 May 2025 32	Al-Ettifaq	0–0	Damac	Dammam
18:55		Report	Al-Sibyani (yellow card) 85'	Stadium: EGO Stadium; Attendance: 2,349; Referee: Abdullah Al-Kharbosh

22 May 2025 33	Damac	0–1	Al-Fateh	Khamis Mushait
19:15	Hamed (yellow card) 23'; Al-Sibyani (yellow card) 45+2'; Al-Anazi (yellow card) 45+3' (yellow-red card) 51'	Report	Batna 63'; Youssouf (yellow card) 75'	Stadium: Damac Club Stadium; Attendance: 2,610; Referee: Faisal Al-Blwi

26 May 2025 34	Al-Ittihad	1–0	Damac	Jeddah
21:00	Bergwijn 72'	Report	Al-Sibyani (yellow card) 89'	Stadium: Alinma Stadium; Attendance: 58,117; Referee: Majed Al-Shamrani

=== King Cup ===
All times are local, AST (UTC+3).

25 September 2024 Round of 32	Al-Najma	2–0	Damac	Unaizah
18:35	Al-Ibrahim (yellow card) 5'; Adnan (yellow card) 36'; Tilica 59' (pen.); Al-Asmari (yellow card) 75'; Al-Mutairi (yellow card) 76'; Aouacheria 85'; Eid (yellow card) 90+5'	Report	Bedrane (yellow card) 43'; H. Al-Ghamdi (yellow card) 45+6'; Al-Obaid (yellow card) 90+3'	Stadium: Department of Education Stadium; Referee: Mohammed Al-Daqqash

== Statistics ==
=== Appearances ===
Last updated on 26 May 2025.

No.	Pos	Nat	Player	Total		Pro League		King's Cup	
No.	Pos	Nat	Player	Apps	Goals	Apps	Goals	Apps	Goals
Goalkeepers
1	GK	(Romania) ROU	Florin Niță	31	0	31	0	0	0
21	GK	(Saudi Arabia) KSA	Yahya Abu Dahi	0	0	0	0	0	0
22	GK	(Saudi Arabia) KSA	Abdulbassit Hawsawi	2	0	1	0	1	0
30	GK	(Saudi Arabia) KSA	Nasser Al-Ghamdi	0	0	0	0	0	0
97	GK	(Saudi Arabia) KSA	Amin Bukhari	2	0	2	0	0	0
Defenders
3	DF	(Algeria) ALG	Abdelkader Bedrane	32	0	31	0	1	0
4	DF	(Saudi Arabia) KSA	Noor Al-Rashidi	18	0	5+13	0	0	0
5	DF	(Saudi Arabia) KSA	Tareq Abdullah	27	0	19+7	0	0+1	0
12	DF	(Saudi Arabia) KSA	Sanousi Hawsawi	20	0	8+12	0	0	0
13	DF	(Saudi Arabia) KSA	Abdulrahman Al-Obaid	24	0	8+15	0	1	0
15	DF	(Algeria) ALG	Farouk Chafaï	32	3	31	3	1	0
20	DF	(Saudi Arabia) KSA	Dhari Al-Anazi	31	0	29+2	0	0	0
23	DF	(Saudi Arabia) KSA	Jawad Al-Qahtani	2	0	0+2	0	0	0
51	DF	(Saudi Arabia) KSA	Ramzi Solan	28	1	27	1	1	0
87	DF	(Saudi Arabia) KSA	Mohammed Al-Khaibari	23	0	11+11	0	0+1	0
Midfielders
6	MF	(Saudi Arabia) KSA	Faisal Al-Subiani	26	0	17+9	0	0	0
7	MF	(Saudi Arabia) KSA	Abdullah Al-Qahtani	4	0	1+3	0	0	0
8	MF	(Egypt) EGY	Tarek Hamed	8	0	6+2	0	0	0
10	MF	(Cameroon) CMR	Georges-Kévin Nkoudou	30	13	29	13	0+1	0
18	MF	(Saudi Arabia) KSA	Ahmed Harisi	7	0	2+5	0	0	0
24	MF	(Saudi Arabia) KSA	Hassan Abu Sharara	2	0	0+2	0	0	0
32	MF	(Romania) ROU	Nicolae Stanciu	30	5	29	5	1	0
90	MF	(Saudi Arabia) KSA	Hazzaa Al-Ghamdi	25	0	6+18	0	1	0
95	MF	(Saudi Arabia) KSA	Ayman Fallatah	26	1	15+10	1	1	0
Forwards
11	FW	(Guinea) GUI	François Kamano	31	4	29+1	4	1	0
17	FW	(Saudi Arabia) KSA	Abdullah Al-Mogren	11	0	1+9	0	0+1	0
80	FW	(Senegal) SEN	Habib Diallo	28	7	27	7	0+1	0
94	FW	(Saudi Arabia) KSA	Meshari Al-Nemer	24	2	7+16	2	1	0
Player who made an appearance this season but have left the club
14	DF	(Saudi Arabia) KSA	Sultan Faqihi	1	0	1	0	0	0
16	MF	(Saudi Arabia) KSA	Bader Munshi	2	0	1+1	0	0	0
19	FW	(Saudi Arabia) KSA	Thamer Al-Ali	1	0	0	0	1	0

=== Goalscorers ===
Rank	No.	Pos	Nat	Name	Pro League	King's Cup	Total
1	10	MF	(Cameroon)	Georges-Kévin Nkoudou	13	0	13
2	80	FW	(Senegal)	Habib Diallo	7	0	7
3	32	MF	(Romania)	Nicolae Stanciu	5	0	5
4	11	FW	(Guinea)	François Kamano	4	0	4
5	15	DF	(Algeria)	Farouk Chafaï	3	0	3
6	94	FW	(Saudi Arabia)	Meshari Al-Nemer	2	0	2
7	51	DF	(Saudi Arabia)	Ramzi Solan	1	0	1
7	95	MF	(Saudi Arabia)	Ayman Fallatah	1	0	1
Own goal					1	0	1
Total					37	0	37

Last Updated: 11 May 2025

=== Assists ===
Rank	No.	Pos	Nat	Name	Pro League	King's Cup	Total
1	32	MF	(Romania)	Nicolae Stanciu	7	0	7
2	10	MF	(Cameroon)	Georges-Kévin Nkoudou	3	0	3
2	51	DF	(Saudi Arabia)	Ramzi Solan	3	0	3
2	80	FW	(Senegal)	Habib Diallo	3	0	3
5	3	DF	(Algeria)	Abdelkader Bedrane	2	0	2
5	11	FW	(Guinea)	François Kamano	2	0	2
7	15	DF	(Algeria)	Farouk Chafaï	1	0	1
7	20	DF	(Saudi Arabia)	Dhari Al-Anazi	1	0	1
7	90	MF	(Saudi Arabia)	Hazzaa Al-Ghamdi	1	0	1
Total					23	0	23

Last Updated: 11 May 2025

=== Clean sheets ===
Rank	No.	Pos	Nat	Name	Pro League	King's Cup	Total
1	1	GK	(Romania)	Florin Niță	7	0	7
Total					7	0	7

Last Updated: 17 May 2025
