= 2025–26 Damac FC season =

Damac
2025–26 season
- President: Khaled Al Masha'at
- Manager: Armando Evangelista
- Stadium: Prince Sultan bin Abdul Aziz Stadium; Damac Club Stadium
- Pro League: Pre-season
- King Cup: Round of 32
- All statistics correct as of 1 July 2025.

The 2025–26 season is Damac's 54th year in their history and seventh consecutive season in the Pro League. The club will participate in the Pro League and the King's Cup.

The season covers the period from 1 July 2025 to 30 June 2026.

== Players ==
=== Squad information ===
As of 1 February 2025

Note: Flags indicate national team as defined under FIFA eligibility rules; some limited exceptions apply. Players may hold more than one non-FIFA nationality.

No.	Pos.	Nation	Player
1	GK	ROU	Florin Niță
3	DF	ALG	Abdelkader Bedrane
4	DF	KSA	Noor Al-Rashidi
5	DF	KSA	Tareq Abdullah
7	MF	KSA	Abdullah Al-Qahtani
8	MF	EGY	Tarek Hamed
10	MF	CMR	Georges-Kévin Nkoudou
11	MF	GUI	François Kamano
12	DF	KSA	Sanousi Hawsawi
13	DF	KSA	Abdulrahman Al-Obaid

No.	Pos.	Nation	Player
15	DF	ALG	Farouk Chafaï (captain)
18	MF	KSA	Ahmed Harisi
20	DF	KSA	Dhari Al-Anazi
21	GK	KSA	Yahya Abu Dahi
23	DF	KSA	Jawad Al-Qahtani
24	MF	KSA	Hassan Abu Sharara
30	GK	KSA	Nasser Al-Ghamdi
51	DF	KSA	Ramzi Solan
90	MF	KSA	Hazzaa Al-Ghamdi

== Transfers and loans ==
=== Transfers in ===
Entry date	Position	No.	Player	From club	Fee	Ref.
26 August 2025	GK	33	(Saudi Arabia) Moataz Al-Baqaawi	(Saudi Arabia) Al-Tai	Free	
26 August 2025	DF	5	(Saudi Arabia) Hassan Rabee	(Saudi Arabia) Al-Ain	Free	
26 August 2025	MF	2	(Guinea) Morlaye Sylla	(Portugal) Arouca	Free	
26 August 2025	MF	8	(Argentina) Valentín Vada	(Russia) Rubin Kazan	Free	
26 August 2025	MF	88	(Saudi Arabia) Khaled Al-Samiri	(Saudi Arabia) Al-Khaleej	Free	
27 August 2025	GK	1	(Brazil) Kewin	(Portugal) Moreirense	Free	
27 August 2025	DF	15	(Morocco) Jamal Harkass	(Morocco) Wydad	$700,000	
27 August 2025	MF	21	(Saudi Arabia) Ahmed Omar	(Saudi Arabia) Ohod	Free	
27 August 2025	MF	77	(Brazil) David Kaiki	(France) Strasbourg	Free	
27 August 2025	FW	10	(France) Nabil Alioui	(Turkey) Adana Demirspor	Free	
27 August 2025	FW	11	(Ivory Coast) Yakou Méïté	(Wales) Cardiff City	Free	
27 August 2025	FW	80	(Saudi Arabia) Yahya Al-Najei	(Saudi Arabia) Al-Wehda	Free	
6 September 2025	FW	28	(Paraguay) Jesús Medina	(Russia) Spartak Moscow	Undisclosed	

=== Loans in ===
Start date	End date	Position	No.	Player	From club	Fee	Ref.
27 August 2025	End of season	DF	22	(Saudi Arabia) Abdulrahman Al-Khaibari	(Saudi Arabia) Al-Ula	None	
2 September 2025	End of season	MF	26	(Saudi Arabia) Riyadh Sharahili	(Saudi Arabia) Neom	None	

=== Transfers out ===
Exit date	Position	No.	Player	To club	Fee	Ref.
30 June 2025	GK	97	(Saudi Arabia) Amin Bukhari	(Saudi Arabia) Al-Nassr	End of loan	
30 June 2025	DF	87	(Saudi Arabia) Mohammed Al-Khaibari	(Saudi Arabia) Al-Khaleej	End of loan	
30 June 2025	MF	6	(Saudi Arabia) Faisal Al-Sibyani	(Saudi Arabia) Al-Ahli	End of loan	
30 June 2025	MF	95	(Saudi Arabia) Ayman Fallatah	(Saudi Arabia) Al-Ahli	End of loan	
30 June 2025	FW	17	(Saudi Arabia) Abdullah Al-Mogren	(Saudi Arabia) Al-Fateh	End of loan	
30 June 2025	FW	80	(Senegal) Habib Diallo	(Saudi Arabia) Al-Shabab	End of loan	
30 June 2025	FW	94	(Saudi Arabia) Meshari Al-Nemer	(Saudi Arabia) Al-Nassr	End of loan	
1 July 2025	MF	32	(Romania) Nicolae Stanciu	(Italy) Genoa	Free	
22 July 2025	GK	22	(Saudi Arabia) Abdulbasit Hawsawi	(Saudi Arabia) Al-Ettifaq	Free	
9 August 2025	MF	10	(Cameroon) Georges-Kévin Nkoudou	(Saudi Arabia) Al-Diriyah	$3,500,000	
27 August 2025	DF	51	(Saudi Arabia) Ramzi Solan	(Saudi Arabia) Al-Kholood	Free	
6 September 2025	MF	8	(Egypt) Tarek Hamed	(Qatar) Al-Bidda	Free	
12 September 2025	FW	11	(Guinea) François Kamano	(Russia) Sochi	Free	
20 September 2025	MF	18	(Saudi Arabia) Ahmed Harisi	(Saudi Arabia) Al-Jandal	Free	
12 January 2026	FW	28	(Paraguay) Jesús Medina		Released	

== Pre-season ==
12 August 2025 Friendly	Damac (Saudi Arabia)	2–2	(Bahrain) Al-Khaldiya	Derince, Turkey
17:30 TRT		Report		Stadium: Derince Suni Çim Stadı

16 August 2025 Friendly	Damac (Saudi Arabia)	0–0	(Kuwait) Kazma	Derince, Turkey
17:00 TRT		Report		Stadium: Derince Suni Çim Stadı

22 August 2025 Friendly	Damac (Saudi Arabia)	2–0	(Saudi Arabia) Al-Okhdood	Abha, Saudi Arabia
17:00 AST				Stadium: Prince Sultan bin Abdulaziz Sports City

== Competitions ==
=== Overview ===
Competition	Record							
Competition	Pld	W	D	L	GF	GA	GD	Win %
Pro League	18	1	8	9	14	33	−19	5.56
King's Cup	1	0	0	1	1	2	−1	0.00
Total	19	1	8	10	15	35	−20	5.26

Updated to match played 30 January 2026
Source: Competitions

=== Pro League ===
==== League table ====
Pos	Team	Pld	W	D	L	GF	GA	GD	Pts	Qualification or relegation
14	Al-Kholood	34	9	6	19	39	61	−22	33	
15	Al-Riyadh	34	7	9	18	35	63	−28	30	
16	Damac (R)	34	6	11	17	32	55	−23	29	Relegation to FD League
17	Al-Okhdood (R)	34	5	5	24	27	70	−43	20	Relegation to FD League
18	Al-Najma (R)	34	3	7	24	32	76	−44	16	Relegation to FD League

Source: SPL
Rules for classification: 1) Points; 2) Head-to-head points; 3) Head-to-head goal difference; 4) Total goal difference; 5) Total goals scored; 6) Fair-play points
(Note: Head-to-head record is used only after all the matches between the teams in question have been played).
(R) Relegated

==== Results summary ====
Overall								Home						Away					
Pld	W	D	L	GF	GA	GD	Pts	W	D	L	GF	GA	GD	W	D	L	GF	GA	GD
18	1	8	9	14	33	−19	11	0	4	4	6	12	−6	1	4	5	8	21	−13

Last updated: 30 January 2026.
Source: Saudi Pro League

==== Results by round ====
Round	1	2	3	4	5	6	7	8	9	11	12	13	14	15	16	17	18	19	20	21	22	23	10	24	25	26	27	28	29	30	31	32	33	34
Ground	H	H	A	H	A	A	H	A	H	A	A	H	A	H	A	H	A	A	H	A	H	H	H	A	H	A	A	H	H	A	H	A	H	A
Result	D	L	L	L	L	D	D	D	D	D	W	L	L	D	D	L	L	L																
Position	10	13	15	15	16	16	17	17	16	16	14	14	14	15	15	15	15	16																

Updated to match(es) played on 30 January 2026. Source: Saudi Pro League
A = Away; H = Home; W = Win; D = Draw; L = Loss

==== Matches ====
All times are local, AST (UTC+3).

Win Draw Loss Postponed

28 August 2025 1	Damac	1–1	Al-Hazem	Khamis Mushait
19:05	Méïté (yellow card) 34'; Al-Samiri (yellow card) 45+1'; Alioui (yellow card) 73'; H. Al-Ghamdi (yellow card) 90+5'; Harkass 90+8'	Report	Al-Yami (yellow card) 23'; Martins 57' (pen.); Mokwana (yellow card) 89'; Al-Harbi (yellow card) 90+9'	Stadium: Damac Club Stadium; Attendance: 373; Referee: Sami Al-Jires

14 September 2025 2	Damac	1–2	Neom	Khamis Mushait
18:50	Medina 49'; Méïté (yellow card) 63'; Harkass (yellow card) 83'	Report	Lacazette 30', 83' (pen.); Noor (yellow card) 90+3'	Stadium: Damac Club Stadium; Attendance: 2,015; Referee: Abdullah Al-Kharbosh

18 September 2025 3	Al-Kholood	2–1	Damac	Ar Rass
18:40	Enrique 11'; N'Doram (yellow card) 14'; Buckley 81'	Report	Vada 23' (pen.)	Stadium: Al-Hazem Club Stadium; Attendance: 2,468; Referee: Sultan Al-Harbi

26 September 2025 4	Damac	1–3	Al-Ettifaq	Khamis Mushait
18:40	Vada 38'; Bedrane (yellow card) 67'; Abdullah (yellow card) 69'; Medina (yellow card) 72'	Report	Duda (yellow card) 1'; Al-Ghannam 40', 57'; Wijnaldum 65'; Madu (yellow card) 90'; Al-Ghamdi (yellow card) 90+3'	Stadium: Damac Club Stadium; Attendance: 2,581; Referee: Abdulsamad Bakri

19 October 2025 5	Al-Taawoun	6–1	Damac	Buraidah
18:10	Al-Ahmed 11'; Mandash 13'; Harkass 53' (o.g.); Martínez 68'; Al-Hurayji 87'; Faivre 88'	Report	Vada 31', (yellow card) 55'; H. Al-Ghamdi (red card) 40'; Kaiki (red card) 59'	Stadium: King Abdullah Sports City; Attendance: 4,037; Referee: Mohammed Al-Hoaish

25 October 2025 6	Al-Shabab	1–1	Damac	Riyadh
17:55	Carrasco 45+6' (pen.)	Report	Bedrane (red card) 45+2'; Hoedt 45+9' (o.g.); Medina (yellow card) 64'; Harkass (yellow card) 90+7'	Stadium: SHG Arena; Attendance: 2,521; Referee: Sultan Al-Harbi

30 October 2025 7	Damac	1–1	Al-Fateh	Abha
18:15	Vada (yellow card) 3'; Al-Anazi (yellow card) 19'; Saâdane 63' (o.g.)	Report	Saâdane (yellow card) 45+1'; Bendebka 47'	Stadium: Prince Sultan bin Abdulaziz Sports City Stadium; Attendance: 271; Referee: Abdullah Al-Harbi

6 November 2025 8	Al-Riyadh	1–1	Damac	Riyadh
20:30	Al-Bawardi (yellow card) 3'; González 24'; Sahlouli (yellow card) 74'; Al-Harfi (yellow card) 77'	Report	Sylla (yellow card) 59'; Rabea (yellow card) 60'; Al-Anazi (yellow card) 77'; Vada 85' (pen.)	Stadium: SHG Arena; Attendance: 550; Referee: Abdullah Al-Kharboush

22 November 2025 9	Damac	0–0	Al-Najma	Khamis Mushait
16:40	Méïté (yellow card) 53'; Al-Qahtani (yellow card) 60'; Harkass (yellow card) 71'; Alioui (yellow card) 90+2'; Al-Anazi (yellow card) 90+7'	Report	Flores (yellow card) 74'	Stadium: Damac Club Stadium; Attendance: 624; Referee: Fraih Al-Jaloud

27 December 2025 10	Al-Qadsiah	1–1	Damac	Dammam
16:00	Retegui 45+1'; Abu Al-Shamat (yellow card) 57'	Report	Vada 4', (yellow card) 45+3'; Sylla (yellow card) 76'; Al-Khaibari (red card) 79'; Bedrane (yellow card) 86'; Kewin (yellow card) 90+3'	Stadium: Prince Mohamed bin Fahd Stadium; Attendance: 6,106; Referee: István Kovács (Romania)

30 December 2025 12	Al-Okhdood	0–1	Damac	Najran
20:30	Borrell (yellow card) 20'; Al-Harthi (yellow card) 82'; Al Abbas (red card) 90+4'	Report	Vada 5'; Bedrane (yellow card) 19'	Stadium: Prince Hathloul bin Abdulaziz Sports City; Attendance: 1,214; Referee: Majed Al-Shamrani

4 January 2026 13	Damac	0–2	Al-Hilal	Abha
20:30	Al-Najei (yellow card) 90+3'	Report	Al-Yami (yellow card) 16'; Núñez 35'; Kanno (yellow card) 41'; Leonardo 53'; Hernández (yellow card) 90+2'	Stadium: Prince Sultan bin Abdulaziz Sports City Stadium; Attendance: 14,873; Referee: Erik Lambrechts (Belgium)

9 January 2026 14	Al-Khaleej	4–0	Damac	Dammam
16:10	Fortounis 1'; Masouras 44'; King 47'; Al-Sultan 80'; Rebocho (yellow card) 85'	Report	Medina (yellow card) 9'; Bedrane (red card) 24'	Stadium: Prince Mohamed bin Fahd Stadium; Attendance: 1,753; Referee: Abdulsamad Bakri

13 January 2026 15	Damac	1–1	Al-Ittihad	Abha
20:30	Al-Qahtani 37'	Report	Al-Shanqeeti 45', (yellow card) 59'; Fabinho (yellow card) 69' (yellow-red card) 90+8'; Bergwijn (yellow card) 90+11'	Stadium: Prince Sultan bin Abdulaziz Sports City Stadium; Attendance: 9,065; Referee: Khalid Al-Turais

17 January 2026 16	Al-Fayha	1–1	Damac	Al Majma'ah
16:35	Semedo (yellow card) 16'; Sakala 26' (pen.); Jason (yellow card) 83'	Report	Rabea (yellow card) 24'; Al-Qahtani 41'; Al-Obaid (yellow card) 80'	Stadium: Al-Majma'ah Sports City Stadium; Attendance: 549; Referee: Ahmed Al-Rumaikhani

21 January 2026 17	Damac	1–2	Al-Nassr	Abha
20:30	Harkass 68'	Report	Ghareeb 5', (yellow card) 80'; Ronaldo 50'; Ângelo (yellow card) 82'	Stadium: Prince Sultan bin Abdulaziz Sports City Stadium; Attendance: 12,678; Referee: Abdullah Al-Kharboush

26 January 2026 18	Al-Hazem	2–1	Damac	Ar Rass
18:20	Al-Shanqiti (yellow card) 57'; Kewin 80' (o.g.); Al-Dakheel 87'; Al-Shamrani (yellow card) 90+5'	Report	Al-Anazi (yellow card) 27'; Al-Samiri (yellow card) 36'; Kewin (yellow card) 37'; Al-Khaibari (yellow card) 45+8'; Bedrane 49'; Méïté (yellow card) 72'	Stadium: Al-Hazem Club Stadium; Attendance: 1,114; Referee: Abdullah Zarban

30 January 2026 19	Neom	3–0	Damac	Tabuk
20:30	Zézé 23'; Lacazette 45+1' (pen.); Abdi (yellow card) 78'; Koné (yellow card) 86', (goal) 90+1'	Report	Al-Obaid (yellow card) 9'; Harkass (yellow card) 30'; Sylla (yellow card) 47'	Stadium: King Khalid Sport City Stadium; Attendance: 1,700; Referee: Mohammed Al-Hoaish

19 December 2025 10	Damac	v	Al-Ahli	Abha
16:45				Stadium: Prince Sultan bin Abdulaziz Sports City Stadium

=== King's Cup ===
All times are local, AST (UTC+3).

23 September 2025 Round of 32	Al-Najma	2–1	Damac	Buraidah
18:35	K. Al-Shammari (yellow card) 23'; A. Al-Shammeri (yellow card) 56'; Lázaro 58'; Al-Kunaydiri (yellow card) 65'; Al Dubais (yellow card) 90+1'; Al-Harabi 90+3'	Report	Harkass (yellow card) 5'; Al-Anazi (yellow card) 22'; H. Al-Ghamdi 79'; Kaiki (yellow card) 81'	Stadium: King Abdullah Sports City; Referee: Mohammed Al-Dagash

== Statistics ==
=== Appearances ===
Last updated on 26 January 2026.

No.	Pos	Nat	Player	Total		Pro League		King's Cup	
No.	Pos	Nat	Player	Apps	Goals	Apps	Goals	Apps	Goals
Goalkeepers
1	GK	(Brazil) BRA	Kewin	19	0	18	0	1	0
30	GK	(Saudi Arabia) KSA	Nasser Al-Ghamdi	0	0	0	0	0	0
33	GK	(Saudi Arabia) KSA	Moataz Al-Baqaawi	0	0	0	0	0	0
Defenders
3	DF	(Algeria) ALG	Abdelkader Bedrane	14	1	13	1	1	0
4	DF	(Saudi Arabia) KSA	Noor Al-Rashidi	1	0	0+1	0	0	0
5	DF	(Saudi Arabia) KSA	Hassan Rabea	12	0	8+4	0	0	0
12	DF	(Saudi Arabia) KSA	Sanousi Hawsawi	15	0	9+5	0	0+1	0
13	DF	(Saudi Arabia) KSA	Abdulrahman Al-Obaid	11	0	9+2	0	0	0
15	DF	(Morocco) MAR	Jamal Harkass	18	2	16+1	2	1	0
20	DF	(Saudi Arabia) KSA	Dhari Al-Anazi	18	0	17	0	1	0
22	DF	(Saudi Arabia) KSA	Abdulrahman Al-Khaibri	18	0	10+7	0	1	0
23	DF	(Saudi Arabia) KSA	Jawad Al-Hassan	1	0	0+1	0	0	0
Midfielders
2	MF	(Guinea) GUI	Morlaye Sylla	17	0	17	0	0	0
6	MF	(Saudi Arabia) KSA	Tareq Abdullah	3	0	0+3	0	0	0
7	MF	(Saudi Arabia) KSA	Abdullah Al-Qahtani	16	2	10+5	2	0+1	0
8	MF	(Argentina) ARG	Valentín Vada	19	6	18	6	1	0
21	MF	(Saudi Arabia) KSA	Ahmed Omar	0	0	0	0	0	0
26	MF	(Saudi Arabia) KSA	Riyadh Sharahili	17	0	15+1	0	1	0
77	MF	(Brazil) BRA	David Kaiki	10	0	5+4	0	1	0
88	MF	(Saudi Arabia) KSA	Khaled Al-Samiri	14	0	2+11	0	0+1	0
90	MF	(Saudi Arabia) KSA	Hazzaa Al-Ghamdi	16	1	10+5	0	1	1
Forwards
10	FW	(France) FRA	Nabil Alioui	7	0	3+3	0	1	0
11	FW	(Ivory Coast) CIV	Yakou Méïté	7	0	3+4	0	0	0
80	FW	(Saudi Arabia) KSA	Yahya Al-Najei	16	0	6+9	0	0+1	0
99	FW	(Brazil) BRA	Arielson	1	0	0+1	0	0	0
Player who made an appearance this season but have left the club
28	FW	(Paraguay) PAR	Jesús Medina	13	1	9+3	1	1	0

=== Goalscorers ===
Rank	No.	Pos	Nat	Name	Pro League	King's Cup	Total
1	8	MF	(Argentina)	Valentín Vada	6	0	6
2	7	MF	(Saudi Arabia)	Abdullah Al-Qahtani	2	0	2
2	15	DF	(Morocco)	Jamal Harkass	2	0	2
4	3	DF	(Algeria)	Abdelkader Bedrane	1	0	1
4	28	FW	(Paraguay)	Jesús Medina	1	0	1
4	90	MF	(Saudi Arabia)	Hazzaa Al-Ghamdi	0	1	1
Own goal					2	0	2
Total					14	1	15

Last Updated: 26 January 2026

=== Assists ===
Rank	No.	Pos	Nat	Name	Pro League	King's Cup	Total
1	8	MF	(Argentina)	Valentín Vada	2	0	2
1	12	DF	(Saudi Arabia)	Sanousi Hawsawi	1	1	2
1	20	DF	(Saudi Arabia)	Dhari Al-Anazi	2	0	2
4	2	MF	(Guinea)	Morlaye Sylla	1	0	1
4	7	MF	(Saudi Arabia)	Abdullah Al-Qahtani	1	0	1
4	13	DF	(Saudi Arabia)	Abdulrahman Al-Obaid	1	0	1
4	26	MF	(Saudi Arabia)	Riyadh Sharahili	1	0	1
Total					9	1	10

Last Updated: 26 January 2026

=== Clean sheets ===
Rank	No.	Pos	Nat	Name	Pro League	King's Cup	Total
1	1	GK	(Brazil)	Kewin	2	0	2
Total					2	0	2

Last Updated: 30 December 2025
