= 2023–24 Damac FC season =

Damac
2023–24 season
- President: Khaled Al Masha'at
- Manager: Cosmin Contra
- Stadium: Prince Sultan bin Abdul Aziz Stadium; Damac Club Stadium
- Pro League: 10th
- King Cup: Round of 16 (knocked out by Al-Khaleej)
- Top goalscorer: League: Georges-Kévin Nkoudou (15); All: Georges-Kévin Nkoudou (15)
- Highest home attendance: 14,556 v Al-Ittihad; 7 December 2023; Saudi Pro League
- Lowest home attendance: 312 v Al-Hazem; 5 October 2023; Saudi Pro League
- Average home league attendance: 4,334

The 2023–24 season was Damac's 52nd year in their history and fifth consecutive season in the Pro League. The club participated in the Pro League and the King Cup.

The season covers the period from 1 July 2023 to 30 June 2024.

== Players ==
=== Squad information ===
As of 1 February 2024

Note: Flags indicate national team as defined under FIFA eligibility rules; some limited exceptions apply. Players may hold more than one non-FIFA nationality.

No.	Pos.	Nation	Player
1	GK	KSA	Bandar Al-Shahrani
2	DF	KSA	Abdulrahman Al-Obaid
3	DF	ALG	Abdelkader Bedrane
4	DF	KSA	Noor Al-Rashidi
7	MF	KSA	Abdullah Al-Qahtani
8	MF	EGY	Tarek Hamed
9	MF	GAM	Assan Ceesay
10	MF	CMR	Georges-Kévin Nkoudou
11	MF	KSA	Abdulaziz Al-Bishi (on loan from Al-Ittihad)
12	MF	KSA	Abdulaziz Makin
14	MF	KSA	Abdulaziz Al-Shahrani
15	DF	ALG	Farouk Chafaï (captain)
16	MF	KSA	Bader Munshi
17	MF	CRO	Domagoj Antolić

No.	Pos.	Nation	Player
18	MF	KSA	Ahmed Harisi
19	DF	KSA	Abdullah Hawsawi
20	DF	KSA	Dhari Al-Anazi
21	DF	KSA	Sanousi Hawsawi
22	GK	KSA	Abdulbassit Hawsawi
23	MF	KSA	Abdulaziz Majrashi
30	GK	ALG	Moustapha Zeghba
31	MF	ROU	Nicolae Stanciu
40	DF	KSA	Hassan Al-Shamrani
41	DF	KSA	Sultan Faqihi
49	MF	KSA	Ahmed Al-Zain
51	DF	KSA	Ramzi Solan
99	FW	KSA	Fahad Al-Johani

=== Out on loan ===
Note: Flags indicate national team as defined under FIFA eligibility rules; some limited exceptions apply. Players may hold more than one non-FIFA nationality.

No.	Pos.	Nation	Player
6	MF	NED	Adam Maher (at Al-Wakrah until 30 June 2024)
24	MF	KSA	Hassan Abu Sharara (at Al-Jabalain until 30 June 2024)

No.	Pos.	Nation	Player
79	MF	KSA	Fares Al-Shahrani (at Jerash until 30 June 2024)
—	FW	KSA	Rayan Al-Qahtani (at Jerash until 30 June 2024)

== Transfers and loans ==
=== Transfers in ===
Entry date	Position	No.	Player	From club	Fee	Ref.
30 June 2023	DF	51	(Saudi Arabia) Ramzi Solan	(Saudi Arabia) Najran	End of loan	
30 June 2023	DF	–	(Saudi Arabia) Omar Al-Muziel	(Saudi Arabia) Al-Shoulla	End of loan	
30 June 2023	MF	49	(Saudi Arabia) Ahmed Al-Zain	(Saudi Arabia) Al-Khaleej	End of loan	
1 July 2023	DF	41	(Saudi Arabia) Sultan Faqihi	(Saudi Arabia) Al-Hazem	Free	
1 July 2023	MF	24	(Saudi Arabia) Hassan Abu Sharara	(Saudi Arabia) Al-Qadsiah	Free	
9 July 2023	MF	18	(Saudi Arabia) Ahmed Harisi	(Saudi Arabia) Al-Qaisumah	Free	
11 July 2023	FW	99	(Saudi Arabia) Fahad Al-Johani	(Saudi Arabia) Al-Tai	Free	
18 July 2022	DF	4	(Saudi Arabia) Noor Al-Rashidi	(Saudi Arabia) Al-Wehda	Free	
28 July 2022	MF	7	(Saudi Arabia) Abdullah Al-Qahtani	(Saudi Arabia) Al-Faisaly	Free	
15 August 2022	MF	10	(Cameroon) Georges-Kévin Nkoudou	(Turkey) Beşiktaş	Free	
16 August 2022	FW	9	(The Gambia) Assan Ceesay	(Italy) Lecce	$3,000,000	
4 September 2023	MF	8	(Egypt) Tarek Hamed	(Saudi Arabia) Al-Ittihad	Free	
7 September 2023	MF	31	(Romania) Nicolae Stanciu	(China) Wuhan Three Towns	$2,677,000	
8 September 2023	DF	2	(Saudi Arabia) Abdulrahman Al-Obaid	(Saudi Arabia) Al-Hilal	Free	
8 September 2023	DF	21	(Saudi Arabia) Sanousi Hawsawi	(Saudi Arabia) Al-Ettifaq	$800,000	

=== Loans in ===
Start date	End date	Position	No.	Player	From club	Fee	Ref.
11 July 2023	End of season	MF	11	(Saudi Arabia) Abdulaziz Al-Bishi	(Saudi Arabia) Al-Ittihad	None	

=== Transfers out ===
Exit date	Position	No.	Player	To club	Fee	Ref.
30 June 2023	MF	11	(Saudi Arabia) Abdulelah Al-Shammeri	(Saudi Arabia) Al-Shabab	End of loan	
1 July 2023	FW	2	(Algeria) Hillal Soudani	(Slovenia) Maribor	Free	
13 July 2023	DF	–	(Saudi Arabia) Omar Al-Muziel	(Saudi Arabia) Hajer	Free	
15 July 2023	DF	4	(Saudi Arabia) Ibrahim Al-Nakhli	(Saudi Arabia) Al-Tai	Free	
21 July 2023	FW	9	(Brazil) Bruno Duarte	(Portugal) Farense	Free	
22 July 2023	MF	18	(Saudi Arabia) Muhannad Al-Najei	(Saudi Arabia) Al-Jabalain	Free	
28 July 2023	MF	38	(Saudi Arabia) Ammar Al-Najjar	(Saudi Arabia) Al-Hazem	Free	
4 August 2023	MF	7	(Saudi Arabia) Mansour Hamzi	(Saudi Arabia) Al-Khaleej	Free	
14 August 2023	DF	32	(Saudi Arabia) Abdullah Hassoun	(Saudi Arabia) Al-Qadsiah	Free	
7 September 2023	DF	13	(Saudi Arabia) Abdullah Al-Ammar	(Saudi Arabia) Al-Ahli	$4,000,000	
10 September 2023	MF	10	(Spain) Nono	(Iran) Nassaji	Free	
20 September 2023	MF	24	(Saudi Arabia) Waleed Al-Enezi	(Saudi Arabia) Al-Jandal	Free	
30 January 2024	GK	33	(Saudi Arabia) Mohammed Al-Mahasneh	(Saudi Arabia) Al-Ittihad	$2,400,000	

=== Loans out ===
Start date	End date	Position	No.	Player	To club	Fee	Ref.
13 August 2023	End of season	MF	79	(Saudi Arabia) Fares Al-Shahrani	(Saudi Arabia) Jerash	None	
13 August 2023	End of season	FW	99	(Saudi Arabia) Rayan Al-Qahtani	(Saudi Arabia) Jerash	None	
28 January 2024	End of season	MF	24	(Saudi Arabia) Hassan Abu Sharara	(Saudi Arabia) Al-Jabalain	None	
15 February 2024	End of season	MF	6	(Netherlands) Adam Maher	(Qatar) Al-Wakrah	None	

== Pre-season ==
19 July 2023 Friendly	Damac (Saudi Arabia)	1–0	(Spain) Cartagena	Murcia, Spain
20:00 CEST	Chafaï (pen.)	Report		Stadium: Pinatar Arena

22 July 2023 Friendly	Damac (Saudi Arabia)	1–2	(Spain) Real Murcia	Murcia, Spain
20:00 CEST	Al-Shamrani	Report	Guarrotxena; Marco	Stadium: Pinatar Arena

== Competitions ==
=== Overview ===
Competition	Record							
Competition	G	W	D	L	GF	GA	GD	Win %
Pro League	34	10	11	13	44	45	−1	29.41
King Cup	2	1	1	0	3	2	+1	50.00
Total	36	11	12	13	47	47	+0	30.56

Updated to match played 27 May 2024
Source: Competitions

=== Pro League ===
==== League table ====
Pos	Team	Pld	W	D	L	GF	GA	GD	Pts
8	Al-Shabab	34	12	8	14	45	42	+3	44 (Note: Al-Shabab finished ahead of Al-Fayha on overall goal difference: Al-Shabab +3, Al-Fayha −8 (Al-Fayha 0–1 Al-Shabab, Al-Shabab 2–3 Al-Fayha).)
9	Al-Fayha	34	11	11	12	44	52	−8	44
10	Damac	34	10	11	13	44	45	−1	41
11	Al-Khaleej	34	9	10	15	36	47	−11	37 (Note: Al-Khaleej finished ahead of Al-Raed on head-to-head points: Al-Khaleej: 4 pts, Al-Raed: 1 pts (Al-Khaleej 0–0 Al-Raed, Al-Raed 0–1 Al-Khaleej).)
12	Al-Raed	34	9	10	15	41	49	−8	37

Source: SPL
Rules for classification: 1) Points; 2) Head-to-head points; 3) Head-to-head goal difference; 4) Total goal difference; 5) Total goals scored; 6) Fair-play points
(Note: Head-to-head record is used only after all the matches between the teams in question have been played).

==== Results summary ====
Overall								Home						Away					
Pld	W	D	L	GF	GA	GD	Pts	W	D	L	GF	GA	GD	W	D	L	GF	GA	GD
34	10	11	13	44	45	−1	41	6	6	5	26	19	+7	4	5	8	18	26	−8

Last updated: 27 May 2024.
Source: spl.com.sa

==== Results by round ====
Round	1	2	3	4	5	6	7	8	9	10	11	12	13	14	15	16	17	18	19	20	21	22	23	24	25	26	27	28	29	30	31	32	33	34
Ground	A	H	A	H	A	A	H	A	H	A	H	A	H	H	A	H	A	H	A	H	A	H	H	A	H	A	H	A	H	A	A	H	A	H
Result	L	D	D	D	L	L	D	W	W	L	W	D	D	W	W	W	W	W	L	L	D	L	W	L	L	D	L	W	L	L	D	D	L	D
Position	13	12	13	12	16	17	14	12	10	12	9	11	10	10	8	6	6	5	6	6	6	6	6	7	7	8	8	8	8	10	10	10	10	10

Updated to match(es) played on 27 May 2024. Source: spl.com.sa
A = Away; H = Home; W = Win; D = Draw; L = Loss

==== Matches ====
All times are local, AST (UTC+3).

Win Draw Loss Postponed

12 August 2023 1	Al-Tai	1–0	Damac	Ha'il
18:00	Al-Harabi 79'	Report	A. Hawsawi (yellow card) 25'; Munshi (yellow card) 28'; Abu Sharara (yellow card) 40'; Makin (yellow card) 82'; Bedrane (yellow card) 90+4'	Stadium: Prince Abdul Aziz bin Musa'ed Stadium; Attendance: 1,750; Referee: Abdullah Al-Harbi

17 August 2023 2	Damac	2–2	Al-Riyadh	Khamis Mushait
18:00	Al-Ammar 53', 90+10', (yellow card) 90+11'; Ceesay (yellow card) 75'	Report	Al Abbas 12', 35'; Al-Zaqaan (yellow card) 41'; Campaña (yellow card) 89'	Stadium: Damac Club Stadium; Attendance: 1,109; Referee: Abdullah Al-Kharboush

25 August 2023 3	Al-Shabab	1–1	Damac	Riyadh
21:00	Bahebri (yellow card) 27'; Diallo (yellow card) 45'; Al-Sharari (yellow card) 45+7'; Santos (yellow card) 69'; F. Al-Muwallad 89'	Report	Maher (yellow card) 40'; Al-Bishi (yellow card) 45+5'; Nkoudou 71'; Al-Shamrani (yellow card) 83'; Zeghba (yellow card) 90+1'	Stadium: Prince Faisal bin Fahd Stadium; Attendance: 1,588; Referee: Mohammed Al-Harbi

29 August 2023 4	Damac	2–2	Al-Fateh	Khamis Mushait
18:00	Ceesay 23' (pen.), 45+3'; Al-Ammar (yellow card) 32'; Munshi (yellow card) 42'	Report	Al-Buraikan 61', 90+3'; Petros (yellow card) 90+6'	Stadium: Damac Club Stadium; Attendance: 1,118; Referee: Khaled Al-Teris

2 September 2023 5	Al-Ettifaq	3–1	Damac	Dammam
21:00	Dembélé 13', 23'; Henderson (yellow card) 44'; Al-Shamrani 68'	Report	Nkoudou 7' (pen.); Munshi (yellow card) 68'; Antolić (yellow card) 87'	Stadium: Prince Mohamed bin Fahd Stadium; Attendance: 2,281; Referee: Majed Al-Shamrani

14 September 2023 6	Al-Wehda	4–2	Damac	Mecca
21:00	Ighalo 17', 45+1' (pen.), 52'; Goodwin 62'; Al-Hafith (yellow card) 86'	Report	Ceesay 36'; Al-Rashidi (red card) 43'; Faqihi 83', (yellow card) 90+1'; A. Hawsawi (yellow card) 85'	Stadium: King Abdul Aziz Stadium; Attendance: 820; Referee: Abdullah Al-Harbi

21 September 2023 7	Damac	1–1	Al-Hilal	Abha
18:00	Hamed (yellow card) 12'; Al-Anazi (yellow card) 45+3'; Stanciu 68'	Report	Malcom 9'; Michael (yellow card) 90+2'	Stadium: Prince Sultan bin Abdul Aziz Stadium; Attendance: 11,072; Referee: István Kovács (Romania)

30 September 2023 8	Al-Khaleej	0–2	Damac	Dammam
21:00	Hamzi (yellow card) 24'; Rodrigues (yellow card) 64'; Martins (yellow card) 90+1'; Al Salem (yellow card) 90+6'	Report	Antolić (yellow card) 14'; Chafaï 43'; Nkoudou 56'	Stadium: Prince Mohamed bin Fahd Stadium; Attendance: 1,881; Referee: Mohammed Al-Hoaish

5 October 2023 9	Damac	4–1	Al-Hazem	Khamis Mushait
15:00	Ceesay 16'; Nkoudou 42'; Al-Zain 46'; Viana 63' (o.g.); Hamed (yellow card) 82'	Report	Al-Habashi 83'	Stadium: Damac Club Stadium; Attendance: 312; Referee: Abdulrahman Al-Sultan

21 October 2023 10	Al-Nassr	2–1	Damac	Riyadh
18:00	Al-Khaibari (yellow card) 10'; Talisca 52'; Ronaldo 56'; Boushal (yellow card) 90+7'	Report	Nkoudou 45+2'; Hamed (yellow card) 50'; Ceesay (yellow card) 60'	Stadium: Al-Awwal Park; Attendance: 16,875; Referee: Saíd Martínez (Honduras)

26 October 2023 11	Damac	2–0	Al-Okhdood	Khamis Mushait
18:00	Al-Zain 48'; Nkoudou 69'; Al-Anazi (yellow card) 79'; Hamed (yellow card) 90+6'	Report	Tawamba (yellow card) 36'; Khamis (yellow card) 57'; Tănase (yellow card) 62'	Stadium: Damac Club Stadium; Attendance: 1,614; Referee: Faisal Al-Blwi

5 November 2023 12	Al-Taawoun	0–0	Damac	Buraidah
18:00	El Mahdioui (yellow card) 35'; Flávio (yellow card) 78'	Report	Stanciu (yellow card) 45+4'	Stadium: Al-Taawoun Club Stadium; Attendance: 4,186; Referee: Abdulsamad Bakri

9 November 2023 13	Damac	2–2	Al-Ahli	Abha
21:00	Chafaï 73'; Stanciu 90+1'	Report	Hindi 10', (yellow card) 90+6'; Kessié (yellow card) 38'; Al-Nabit 44'; Ibañez (yellow card) 90+7'	Stadium: Prince Sultan bin Abdul Aziz Stadium; Attendance: 13,874; Referee: Leandro Rey Hilfer (Argentina)

25 November 2023 14	Damac	4–2	Abha	Abha
21:00	Nkoudou 44', 45+5' (pen.), 90+5' (pen.); Al-Obaid (yellow card) 51'; Ceesay 90+8'	Report	Sami (yellow card) 1', (goal) 75'; Krychowiak (yellow card) 7'; Al-Habib (yellow card) 45+2' (yellow-red card) 47'; Munshi 64' (o.g.); Bguir (yellow card) 79'	Stadium: Prince Sultan bin Abdul Aziz Stadium; Attendance: 637; Referee: Ahmed Al-Rumaikhani

1 December 2023 15	Al-Fayha	2–4	Damac	Al Majma'ah
18:00	Sakala (yellow card) 32'; Zidan (yellow card) 45+2'; Onyekuru 56', 69'	Report	Nkoudou 16' (pen.), 65'; Al-Shahrani 36'; Hamed (yellow card) 84'; Al-Mahasneh (yellow card) 90+4'; Ceesay 90+6'	Stadium: Al Majma'ah Sports City; Attendance: 528; Referee: Mohammed Al-Hoaish

7 December 2023 16	Damac	3–1	Al-Ittihad	Abha
18:00	Nkoudou 12', 45+7'; S. Hawsawi (yellow card) 22'; Grohe 46' (o.g.)	Report	Hamdallah 45+3' (pen.), (yellow card) 68'; Al-Shamrani (yellow card) 75'; Kadesh (yellow card) 90+2'	Stadium: Prince Sultan bin Abdul Aziz Stadium; Attendance: 14,556; Referee: Saíd Martínez (Honduras)

15 December 2023 17	Al-Raed	0–1	Damac	Buraidah
18:00	Loum (yellow card) 22'; Al-Jayzani (yellow card) 54'; Normann (yellow card) 90+6'	Report	Antolić (yellow card) 17'; Al-Zain (yellow card) 37'; Nkoudou 42'	Stadium: King Abdullah Sport City Stadium; Attendance: 1,453; Referee: Mohammed Abu Shaqarah

21 December 2023 18	Damac	3–0	Al-Tai	Khamis Mushait
18:00	Chafaï 57'; Bedrane 85'; Ceesay (yellow card) 90+3'; Stanciu 90+11'	Report	Majrashi (yellow card) 55'; Dugandžić (yellow card) 63'; Mensah (yellow card) 74' (yellow-red card) 90+1'; Al-Toiawy (yellow card) 78'; Al-Moasher (yellow card) 88'	Stadium: Damac Club Stadium; Attendance: 2,707; Referee: Sultan Al-Okairy

28 December 2023 19	Al-Riyadh	1–0	Damac	Riyadh
18:00	Gray 51'; Juanmi (yellow card) 90+1'; Al-Khaibari (yellow card) 90+9'	Report	S. Hawsawi (yellow card) 12'; Stanciu (yellow card) 78'	Stadium: Prince Faisal bin Fahd Stadium; Attendance: 299; Referee: Ahmed Al-Rumaikhani

16 February 2024 20	Damac	0–1	Al-Shabab	Khamis Mushait
17:00	Hamed (yellow card) 18'; Hawsawi (yellow card) 51' (yellow-red card) 67'	Report	Bahebri (yellow card) 21'; Saïss (yellow card) 50'; Rakitić 82'	Stadium: Damac Club Stadium; Attendance: 3,845; Referee: Jesús Valenzuela (Venezuela)

23 February 2024 21	Al-Fateh	1–1	Damac	Al-Hasa
20:00	Bendebka 52', (yellow card) 64'; Zelarayán (yellow card) 78'	Report	Nkoudou 65'	Stadium: Al-Fateh Club Stadium; Attendance: 7,865; Referee: Faisal Al-Blwi

2 March 2024 22	Damac	0–2	Al-Ettifaq	Khamis Mushait
17:00	Zeghba (red card) 23'	Report	Gray 16'; Dembélé 45+6' (pen.)	Stadium: Damac Club Stadium; Attendance: 2,974; Referee: Mohammed Al-Hoaish

7 March 2024 23	Damac	1–0	Al-Wehda	Khamis Mushait
17:00	Bukhari 22' (o.g.); Al-Anazi (yellow card) 90+6'	Report	El Yamiq (yellow card) 28', (red card) 72'; Anselmo (yellow card) 51'	Stadium: Damac Club Stadium; Attendance: 2,783; Referee: Mohammed Al-Beredi

16 March 2024 24	Al-Hilal	2–1	Damac	Riyadh
22:00	Al-Bulaihi (yellow card) 11'; Abdulhamid (yellow card) 39'; S. Al-Dawsari 79'; Michael 90+3'	Report	Hamed (yellow card) 17'; Bedrane (yellow card) 70'; Antolić 86'; Al-Anazi (red card) 88'	Stadium: Kingdom Arena; Attendance: 16,451; Referee: Adonai Escobedo (Mexico)

29 March 2024 25	Damac	0–1	Al-Khaleej	Khamis Mushait
22:00	Solan (yellow card) 19'; Antolić (yellow card) 49'; Hamed (yellow card) 90+8'; S. Hawsawi (red card) 90+10'	Report	Narey 35', (yellow card) 90+10'; Jung Woo-young (red card) 80'; Sherif (yellow card) 83'; López (yellow card) 90+1'; Martins (yellow card) 90+11'	Stadium: Damac Club Stadium; Attendance: 1,893; Referee: Sami Al-Jires

1 April 2024 26	Al-Hazem	0–0	Damac	Ar Rass
22:00		Report	Munshi (yellow card) 73'	Stadium: Al-Hazem Club Stadium; Attendance: 196; Referee: Abdulrahman Al-Sultan

5 April 2024 27	Damac	0–1	Al-Nassr	Abha
22:00	Antolić (yellow card) 40'	Report	Qassem (yellow card) 41'; Lajami (yellow card) 69'; Laporte 90+1'	Stadium: Prince Sultan bin Abdul Aziz Stadium; Attendance: 14,065; Referee: Abdulsamad Bakri

20 April 2024 28	Al-Okhdood	1–2	Damac	Najran
18:00	Al-Zabdani (yellow card) 17'; Al-Rubaie 47'	Report	Stanciu 10'; Al-Zain (yellow card) 22'; Antolić 37'; Hamed (yellow card) 71'; Al-Anazi (yellow card) 88'	Stadium: Prince Hathloul bin Abdul Aziz Sports City; Attendance: 560; Referee: Khaled Al-Teris

26 April 2024 29	Damac	0–1	Al-Taawoun	Khamis Mushait
18:00	Stanciu (yellow card) 47'; Al-Zain (red card) 88'; Zeghba (yellow card) 90+1'	Report	Pedro (yellow card) 45', (goal) 89'; Al-Ghamdi (yellow card) 57'	Stadium: Damac Club Stadium; Attendance: 337; Referee: Shukri Al-Hanfoush

2 May 2024 30	Al-Ahli	4–1	Damac	Jeddah
21:00	Al-Johani 7'; Al-Buraikan 10'; Mahrez 19' (pen.); Firmino 25'	Report	Al-Johani (yellow card) 44'; Antolić 62'; Chafaï (yellow card) 70', (red card) 77'; Makin (yellow card) 90+1'	Stadium: Prince Abdullah Al Faisal Stadium; Attendance: 10,762; Referee: Abdullah Al-Awedan

10 May 2024 31	Abha	0–0	Damac	Abha
18:00	Al-Ali (yellow card) 16'; Matić (yellow card) 25'; Noguera (yellow card) 75'	Report	Munshi (yellow card) 27'	Stadium: Prince Sultan bin Abdul Aziz Stadium; Attendance: 954; Referee: Sami Al-Jires

17 May 2024 32	Damac	1–1	Al-Fayha	Khamis Mushait
19:15	Al-Rashidi (yellow card) 24'; S. Hawsawi (yellow card) 35'; Makin (yellow card) 62'; Solan 79', (yellow card) 80'	Report	Sakala 42' (pen.); Stojković (yellow card) 71'	Stadium: Damac Club Stadium; Attendance: 462; Referee: Abdullah Al-Harbi

23 May 2024 33	Al-Ittihad	4–1	Damac	Jeddah
21:00	Jota 39'; Haji 48'; Al Mousa (yellow card) 62'; Al-Shanqeeti (yellow card) 65'; Al-Sahafi 78'; Al-Nashri (yellow card) 85'; Al-Shamrani 87'	Report	Chafaï 90+3'	Stadium: Prince Abdullah Al Faisal Stadium; Attendance: 17,137; Referee: Shukri Al-Hanfoush

27 May 2024 34	Damac	1–1	Al-Raed	Khamis Mushait
21:00	Chafaï 7'; Solan (yellow card) 80'	Report	Al-Jayzani (yellow card) 60'; Gonzalez (yellow card) 70'; M. Al-Dossari (yellow card) 78'; Hawsawi 89' (o.g.)	Stadium: Damac Club Stadium; Attendance: 316; Referee: Abdulsamad Bakri

=== King Cup ===
All times are local, AST (UTC+3).

25 September 2023 Round of 32	Damac	2–1	Al-Qaisumah	Khamis Mushait
21:00	Stanciu 31'; Ceesay (yellow card) 44', (goal) 73'; S. Hawsawi (yellow card) 90'	Report	Sakandé (yellow card) 9'; Soeidan (yellow card) 14'; Faqihi 77' (o.g.); Habkor (yellow card) 90+5'	Stadium: Damac Club Stadium; Referee: Abdullah Al-Harbi

30 October 2023 Round of 16	Al-Khaleej	1–1 (a.e.t.) (6–5 p)	Damac	Khobar
17:45	Jung Woo-young 27'; Hawsawi (yellow card) 41'; Rebocho (yellow card) 96'; Hamzi (red card) 105+2'	Report	Chafaï (yellow card) 23'; Stanciu 33'; Ceesay (yellow card) 37'; Al-Anazi (yellow card) 120+2'	Stadium: Prince Saud bin Jalawi Stadium; Attendance: 1,096; Referee: Abdullah Al-Harbi
	Penalties
	López (penalty scored); Narey (penalty missed); Nasser (penalty scored); Al Salem (penalty scored); Rodrigues (penalty scored); Al-Samiri (penalty scored); Al-Torais (penalty scored)		(penalty scored) Chafaï; (penalty missed) Harisi; (penalty scored) Stanciu; (penalty scored) Hamed; (penalty scored) Al-Shahrani; (penalty scored) Al-Anazi; (penalty missed) Makin

== Statistics ==
=== Appearances ===
Last updated on 27 May 2024.

No.	Pos	Nat	Player	Total		Pro League		King Cup	
No.	Pos	Nat	Player	Apps	Goals	Apps	Goals	Apps	Goals
Goalkeepers
1	GK	(Saudi Arabia) KSA	Bandar Al-Shahrani	0	0	0	0	0	0
22	GK	(Saudi Arabia) KSA	Abdulbassit Hawsawi	6	0	5+1	0	0	0
30	GK	(Algeria) ALG	Moustapha Zeghba	23	0	21	0	2	0
Defenders
2	DF	(Saudi Arabia) KSA	Abdulrahman Al-Obaid	9	0	1+8	0	0	0
3	DF	(Algeria) ALG	Abdelkader Bedrane	27	1	27	1	0	0
4	DF	(Saudi Arabia) KSA	Noor Al-Rashidi	17	0	11+5	0	0+1	0
15	DF	(Algeria) ALG	Farouk Chafaï	30	5	28	5	2	0
19	DF	(Saudi Arabia) KSA	Abdullah Hawsawi	7	0	4+3	0	0	0
20	DF	(Saudi Arabia) KSA	Dhari Al-Anazi	32	0	25+5	0	2	0
21	DF	(Saudi Arabia) KSA	Sanousi Hawsawi	26	0	24	0	2	0
40	DF	(Saudi Arabia) KSA	Hassan Al-Shamrani	4	0	2+2	0	0	0
41	DF	(Saudi Arabia) KSA	Sultan Faqihi	19	1	6+11	1	2	0
51	DF	(Saudi Arabia) KSA	Ramzi Solan	19	1	7+12	1	0	0
Midfielders
7	MF	(Saudi Arabia) KSA	Abdullah Al-Qahtani	21	0	4+15	0	0+2	0
8	MF	(Egypt) EGY	Tarek Hamed	24	0	22	0	2	0
10	MF	(Cameroon) CMR	Georges-Kévin Nkoudou	33	15	29+2	15	2	0
11	MF	(Saudi Arabia) KSA	Abdulaziz Al-Bishi	16	0	11+5	0	0	0
12	MF	(Saudi Arabia) KSA	Abdulaziz Makin	11	0	2+8	0	0+1	0
14	MF	(Saudi Arabia) KSA	Abdulaziz Al-Shahrani	25	1	13+11	1	0+1	0
16	MF	(Saudi Arabia) KSA	Bader Munshi	24	0	13+10	0	0+1	0
17	MF	(Croatia) CRO	Domagoj Antolić	32	3	30	3	2	0
18	MF	(Saudi Arabia) KSA	Ahmed Harisi	13	0	4+8	0	0+1	0
23	MF	(Saudi Arabia) KSA	Abdulaziz Majrashi	22	0	3+17	0	0+2	0
31	MF	(Romania) ROU	Nicolae Stanciu	29	6	27	4	2	2
49	MF	(Saudi Arabia) KSA	Ahmed Al-Zain	28	2	22+4	2	2	0
Forwards
9	FW	(The Gambia) GAM	Assan Ceesay	21	7	12+7	6	2	1
99	FW	(Saudi Arabia) KSA	Fahad Al-Johani	15	0	4+10	0	0+1	0
Players sent out on loan this season
6	MF	(Netherlands) NED	Adam Maher	4	0	2+2	0	0	0
24	MF	(Saudi Arabia) KSA	Hassan Abu Sharara	4	0	2+1	0	0+1	0
Player who made an appearance this season but have left the club
13	DF	(Saudi Arabia) KSA	Abdullah Al-Ammar	5	2	5	2	0	0
33	GK	(Saudi Arabia) KSA	Mohammed Al-Mahasneh	8	0	8	0	0	0
95	MF	(Saudi Arabia) KSA	Ryan Al-Mousa	1	0	0+1	0	0	0

=== Goalscorers ===
Rank	No.	Pos	Nat	Name	Pro League	King Cup	Total
1	10	MF	(Cameroon)	Georges-Kévin Nkoudou	15	0	15
2	9	FW	(The Gambia)	Assan Ceesay	6	1	7
3	31	MF	(Romania)	Nicolae Stanciu	4	2	6
4	15	DF	(Algeria)	Farouk Chafaï	5	0	5
5	17	MF	(Croatia)	Domagoj Antolić	3	0	3
6	13	DF	(Saudi Arabia)	Abdullah Al-Ammar	2	0	2
6	49	MF	(Saudi Arabia)	Ahmed Al-Zain	2	0	2
8	3	DF	(Algeria)	Abdelkader Bedrane	1	0	1
8	14	MF	(Saudi Arabia)	Abdulaziz Al-Shahrani	1	0	1
8	41	DF	(Saudi Arabia)	Sultan Faqihi	1	0	1
8	51	DF	(Saudi Arabia)	Ramzi Solan	1	0	1
Own goal					3	0	3
Total					44	3	47

Last Updated: 27 May 2024

=== Assists ===
Rank	No.	Pos	Nat	Name	Pro League	King Cup	Total
1	31	MF	(Romania)	Nicolae Stanciu	7	0	7
2	10	MF	(Cameroon)	Georges-Kévin Nkoudou	5	0	5
3	14	MF	(Saudi Arabia)	Abdulaziz Al-Shahrani	3	0	3
4	7	MF	(Saudi Arabia)	Abdullah Al-Qahtani	2	0	2
4	8	MF	(Egypt)	Tarek Hamed	2	0	2
4	17	MF	(Croatia)	Domagoj Antolić	2	0	2
4	21	DF	(Saudi Arabia)	Sanousi Hawsawi	2	0	2
4	49	MF	(Saudi Arabia)	Ahmed Al-Zain	2	0	2
9	2	DF	(Saudi Arabia)	Abdulrahman Al-Obaid	1	0	1
9	3	DF	(Algeria)	Abdelkader Bedrane	1	0	1
9	9	FW	(The Gambia)	Assan Ceesay	1	0	1
9	11	MF	(Saudi Arabia)	Abdulaziz Al-Bishi	1	0	1
Total					29	0	29

Last Updated: 27 May 2024

=== Clean sheets ===
Rank	No.	Pos	Nat	Name	Pro League	King Cup	Total
1	30	GK	(Algeria)	Moustapha Zeghba	4	0	4
2	33	GK	(Saudi Arabia)	Mohammed Al-Mahasneh	3	0	3
3	22	GK	(Saudi Arabia)	Abdulbassit Hawsawi	1	0	1
Total					8	0	8

Last Updated: 10 May 2024
