= 2023–24 King's Cup (Saudi Arabia) =

2023–24 King Cup
Custodian of the Two Holy Mosques Cup

Tournament details
- Country: Saudi Arabia
- Dates: 24 September 2023 – 31 May 2024

Final positions
- Champions: Al-Hilal (11th title)
- Runners-up: Al-Nassr

Tournament statistics
- Matches played: 31
- Goals scored: 93 (3 per match)
- Top goal scorer(s): Abderrazak Hamdallah; Yannick Carrasco; Aleksandar Mitrović; Sadio Mané (4 goals each)
- All statistics correct as of 31 May 2024.

The 2023–24 King Cup, or The Custodian of the Two Holy Mosques Cup, was the 49th edition of the King Cup since its establishment in 1957. The tournament began on 24 September 2023 and concluded with the final on 31 May 2024.

Al-Hilal were the defending champions after winning their tenth title last season. They retained the trophy after beating Al-Nassr on penalties following a 1–1 draw after extra time in the final.

== Format changes ==
On 3 March 2023, the SAFF announced that the number of teams in the tournament was increased from 16 to 32. This will be the first tournament since 2020 in which Saudi First Division League teams will participate.

== Participating teams ==
A total of 32 teams will participate this season, 18 of which compete in the Pro League and 14 in the First Division.

| League | Teams |
|---|---|
| Pro League | Abha; Al-Ahli; Al-Ettifaq; Al-Fateh; Al-Fayha; Al-Hazem; Al-Hilal ^{TH}; Al-Ittihad; Al-Khaleej; Al-Nassr; Al-Okhdood; Al-Raed; Al-Riyadh; Al-Shabab; Al-Taawoun; Al-Tai; Al-Wehda; Damac |
| FD League | Al-Adalah; Al-Ain; Al-Arabi; Al-Batin; Al-Faisaly; Al-Jabalain; Al-Kholood; Al-Najma; Al-Orobah; Al-Qadsiah; Al-Qaisumah; Hajer; Jeddah; Ohod |

== Round of 32 ==
The draw for the Round of 32 was held on 19 July 2023. The dates for the Round of 32 fixtures were announced on 13 August 2023. All times are local, AST (UTC+3).

| 24 September 2023 1 | Al-Taawoun (1) | 2–0 | Al-Qadsiah (2) | Buraidah |
| 18:00 | Barrow 9'; Faqeehi (yellow card) 27'; Girotto (yellow card) 63'; Al-Abdulrazzaq (yellow card) 68'; Al-Shammeri (yellow card) 75'; Adam 90+7' | Report | Hack (yellow card) 13'; Hazazi (yellow card) 73' | Stadium: Al-Taawoun Club Stadium; Attendance: 2,282; Referee: Abdulsamad Bakri |

| 24 September 2023 4 | Al-Ettifaq (1) | 4–0 | Jeddah (2) | Dammam |
| 18:00 | Wijnaldum 26'; Dembélé 38', 45'; Al-Kuwaykibi 59' | Report | | Stadium: Prince Mohamed bin Fahd Stadium; Referee: Shukri Al-Hanfoush |

| 24 September 2023 7 | Al-Hazem (1) | 3–1 | Al-Arabi (2) | Ar Rass |
| 21:00 | Selemani 10', 14'; Ricardo (yellow card) 20'; Al-Thani 30' | Report | Miranda 45+3'; Al-Muwallad (yellow card) 53' (yellow-red card) 82'; Jobson (yellow card) 64' | Stadium: Al-Hazem Club Stadium; Attendance: 364; Referee: Abdullah Al-Shehri |

| 24 September 2023 11 | Al-Shabab (1) | 2–1 (a.e.t.) | Al-Batin (2) | Riyadh |
| 21:00 | Banega (yellow card) 23'; Carrasco 33', 118' | Report | Alemán 37'; Nasser (yellow card) 60' | Stadium: Prince Faisal bin Fahd Stadium; Attendance: 871; Referee: Mohammed Abo Shaqqara |

| 25 September 2023 13 | Al-Jabalain (2) | 0–1 | Al-Hilal (1) | Ha'il |
| 18:00 | Al-Sharid (yellow card) 84' | Report | Neves 64'; Milinković-Savić (yellow card) 89' | Stadium: Prince Abdul Aziz bin Musa'ed Stadium; Referee: Matthew Conger (New Zealand) |

| 25 September 2023 15 | Al-Najma (2) | 2–1 | Al-Raed (1) | Unaizah |
| 18:00 | Barry 11'; Cariús 13'; Al-Khaibari (yellow card) 71'; Tilica (yellow card) 90+7' | Report | Wohaishi (yellow card) 25'; F. Al-Ghamdi (yellow card) 41'; El Berkaoui 60'; Al-Jayzani (yellow card) 68'; M. Al-Dossari (yellow card) 90+7'; Al-Beshe (yellow card) 90+8' | Stadium: Department of Education Stadium; Referee: Sultan Al-Okairy |

| 25 September 2023 3 | Damac (1) | 2–1 | Al-Qaisumah (2) | Khamis Mushait |
| 21:00 | Stanciu 31'; Ceesay (yellow card) 44', (goal) 73'; S. Hawsawi (yellow card) 90' | Report | Sakandé (yellow card) 9'; Soeidan (yellow card) 14'; Faqihi 77' (o.g.); Habkor (yellow card) 90+5' | Stadium: Damac Club Stadium; Referee: Abdullah Al-Harbi |

| 25 September 2023 16 | Ohod (2) | 1–5 | Al-Nassr (1) | Jeddah |
| 21:00 | Al-Khaibari (yellow card) 13'; Milesi (yellow card) 34'; Michalak 45+4'; Al-Ruwaili (yellow card) 47' | Report | Mané 16' (pen.); Talisca (yellow card) 32', (goal) 73'; Fofana 62'; Telles (yellow card) 66'; Yahya 81'; Al-Najei 86' | Stadium: Prince Abdullah Al-Faisal Stadium; Attendance: 5,713; Referee: Harald Lechner (Austria) |

| 26 September 2023 5 | Al-Ain (2) | 2–3 | Al-Ahli (1) | Al Bahah |
| 18:00 | Al-Hulayel (yellow card) 15'; Dagarshawi (yellow card) 51'; Dodô 82', 90+7' | Report | Al-Buraikan 23', 29'; Al-Nabit 39' | Stadium: King Saud Sport City Stadium; Attendance: 1,943; Referee: Kevin Ortega (Peru) |

| 26 September 2023 6 | Al-Riyadh (1) | 1–2 | Al-Fayha (1) | Riyadh |
| 18:00 | Ndong 16'; Kurdi (yellow card) 42'; Gray (yellow card) 90+11' | Report | Al-Abdulmenem 19', 45+3'; R. Kaabi (yellow card) 44'; Sabiri (yellow card) 84'; Al-Rashidi (yellow card) 90+11' | Stadium: Prince Faisal bin Fahd Stadium; Attendance: 61; Referee: Mohammed Al-Harbi |

| 26 September 2023 8 | Al-Faisaly (2) | 2–0 | Al-Tai (1) | Al Majma'ah |
| 21:00 | Barnawi (yellow card) 45+1'; Garita (yellow card) 51', (goal) 54'; Fallatah (yellow card) 52'; Morato (yellow card) 84'; Mikels 87' | Report | Bauer (yellow card) 23'; Al-Harthi (yellow card) 46' | Stadium: Al Majma'ah Sports City; Referee: Ahmed Al-Rumaikhani |

| 26 September 2023 9 | Al-Kholood (2) | 1–1 (a.e.t.) (6–7 p) | Al-Ittihad (1) | Ar Rass |
| 21:00 | Al-Dossari (yellow card) 33'; Vázquez 40' | Report | Dias 18' (o.g.); Al-Olayan (yellow card) 37'; Fabinho (yellow card) 72'; Felipe (yellow card) 92' | Stadium: Al-Hazem Club Stadium; Attendance: 1,263; Referee: Andrei Chivulete (Romania) |
| | Penalties |
| | Rezende (penalty scored); Taira (penalty scored); Vázquez (penalty scored); Al-Nakhli (penalty missed); Al-Suwailem (penalty scored); Al-Rashed (penalty scored); Al-Dossari (penalty missed); Dias (penalty missed); Al-Harbi (penalty scored); Al-Shahrani (penalty missed) | | (penalty missed) Romarinho; (penalty scored) Fabinho; (penalty scored) Bamsaud; (penalty scored) Al-Amri; (penalty scored) Kanté; (penalty scored) Kadesh; (penalty missed) Camara; (penalty missed) Felipe; (penalty scored) Al-Shanqeeti; (penalty scored) Haji |

| 27 September 2023 2 | Al-Orobah (2) | 0–2 | Al-Wehda (1) | Sakakah |
| 18:00 | Al-Dossari (yellow card) 36'; Darwish (yellow card) 50'; R. Al-Ruwaili (yellow card) 90' | Report | El Yamiq (yellow card) 10'; Ighalo 76'; Al-Azizi 89' | Stadium: Al-Orobah Club Stadium; Referee: Meshal Al-Shehri |

| 27 September 2023 12 | Al-Fateh (1) | 3–1 | Al-Okhdood (1) | Al-Hasa |
| 18:00 | Batna 7' (pen.), 90+7'; Al-Saeed (yellow card) 25'; Saâdane (yellow card) 74'; Djaniny 81' | Report | Al Saleem (yellow card) 41'; Al Jahif (yellow card) 47'; Al Mansour (yellow card) 66'; Khodari 90+1' | Stadium: Prince Abdullah bin Jalawi Stadium; Referee: Mohammed Al-Beredi |

| 27 September 2023 10 | Abha (1) | 1–0 (a.e.t.) | Hajer (2) | Abha |
| 21:00 | Krychowiak (yellow card) 8'; Abdulelah S. (yellow card) 22'; Al-Ali (yellow card) 65'; Kamano (yellow card) 74'; Abdu 93' | Report | Bitang (yellow card) 7'; Majrashi (yellow card) 32'; Al-Khalifa (yellow card) 74' | Stadium: Prince Sultan bin Abdul Aziz Stadium; Referee: Freej Al-Jaloud |

| 27 September 2023 14 | Al-Khaleej (1) | 2–0 | Al-Adalah (2) | Dammam |
| 21:00 | Rodrigues 36'; Ouro 90+6' (o.g.) | Report | Al-Salem (yellow card) 27'; Doumbia (yellow card) 57'; Maia (yellow card) 83' | Stadium: Prince Mohamed bin Fahd Stadium; Referee: Sami Al-Jires |

== Round of 16 ==
The draw for the Round of 16 was held on 27 September following the conclusion of the Round of 32. The dates for the Round of 16 fixtures were announced on 2 October 2023. All times are local, AST (UTC+3).

| 30 October 2023 23 | Al-Najma (2) | 0–3 | Al-Faisaly (2) | Buraidah |
| 15:15 | Al-Khaibari (yellow card) 36'; Cariús (yellow card) 47'; Reeman (yellow card) 50' | Report | Souza 4', 51'; Jawshan 45+4' | Stadium: King Abdullah Sports City; Referee: Majed Al-Shamrani |

| 30 October 2023 17 | Al-Khaleej (1) | 1–1 (a.e.t.) (6–5 p) | Damac (1) | Khobar |
| 17:45 | Jung Woo-young 27'; Hawsawi (yellow card) 41'; Rebocho (yellow card) 96'; Hamzi (red card) 105+2' | Report | Chafaï (yellow card) 23'; Stanciu 33'; Ceesay (yellow card) 37'; Al-Anazi (yellow card) 120+2' | Stadium: Prince Saud bin Jalawi Stadium; Attendance: 1,096; Referee: Abdullah Al-Harbi |
| | Penalties |
| | López (penalty scored); Narey (penalty missed); Nasser (penalty scored); Al Salem (penalty scored); Rodrigues (penalty scored); Al-Samiri (penalty scored); Al-Torais (penalty scored) | | (penalty scored) Chafaï; (penalty missed) Harisi; (penalty scored) Stanciu; (penalty scored) Hamed; (penalty scored) Al-Shahrani; (penalty scored) Al-Anazi; (penalty missed) Makin |

| 30 October 2023 19 | Al-Hilal (1) | 3–0 | Al-Hazem (1) | Riyadh |
| 21:00 | Neves 52' (pen.); Mitrović 79', 83' (pen.) | Report | Abousaban (yellow card) 48' | Stadium: King Fahd International Stadium; Attendance: 9,363; Referee: Facundo Tello (Argentina) |

| 31 October 2023 18 | Al-Fateh (1) | 1–2 (a.e.t.) | Al-Shabab (1) | Al-Hasa |
| 15:15 | Al-Fuhaid (yellow card) 16'; Tello 24'; Al-Mohammed (yellow card) 113' | Report | Bahebri (yellow card) 19'; Cuéllar (yellow card) 47'; Carrasco 59', 115', (yellow card) 118'; Al-Sibyani (yellow card) 110'; Kanabah (yellow card) 120+2' | Stadium: Prince Abdullah bin Jalawi Stadium; Attendance: 6,427; Referee: Sami Al-Jires |

| 31 October 2023 21 | Al-Taawoun (1) | 2–0 | Al-Wehda (1) | Buraidah |
| 15:15 | Munir 1' (o.g.); Medrán 11', (yellow card) 73'; El Mahdioui (yellow card) 81' | Report | Bakshween (yellow card) 20'; Al Hejji (yellow card) 27'; Fajr (yellow card) 81' | Stadium: Al-Taawoun Club Stadium; Attendance: 3,416; Referee: Mohammed Al-Hoaish |

| 31 October 2023 22 | Al-Nassr (1) | 1–0 (a.e.t.) | Al-Ettifaq (1) | Riyadh |
| 17:45 | Ronaldo (yellow card) 13'; Talisca (red card) 45+11'; Mané 107'; Otávio (yellow card) 116' | Report | H. Al-Ghamdi (yellow card) 67'; Al-Shamrani (yellow card) 70'; Abdulrahman (yellow card) 77'; Hazazi (red card) 89' | Stadium: Al-Awwal Park; Attendance: 18,341; Referee: Piero Maza (Chile) |

| 31 October 2023 24 | Al-Fayha (1) | 0–3 | Al-Ittihad (1) | Riyadh |
| 17:45 | Ryller (yellow card) 41'; Al-Baqawi (yellow card) 47'; Al-Rashidi (yellow card) 78'; Al-Shuwaish (yellow card) 87' | Report | Hamdallah 5', 87'; Kanté (yellow card) 81'; Benzema 90+4' | Stadium: King Fahd International Stadium; Attendance: 3,942; Referee: Tamás Bognár (Hungary) |

| 31 October 2023 20 | Al-Ahli (1) | 1–2 | Abha (1) | Jeddah |
| 21:00 | Mahrez 45+8' (pen.) | Report | Abdu 45+2'; Al-Qumayzi (yellow card) 45+5'; Al-Habib (yellow card) 45+5'; Sami (red card) 52'; Toko Ekambi 67'; François Kamano (yellow card) 73' (yellow-red card) 90+3' | Stadium: Prince Abdullah Al-Faisal Stadium; Attendance: 13,635; Referee: Paulo Cesar Zanovelli (Brazil) |

== Quarter-finals ==
The draw for the Quarter-finals was held on 2 November. The dates for the Quarter-finals fixtures were announced on 6 November 2023. All times are local, AST (UTC+3).

| 11 December 2023 26 | Abha (1) | 1–2 | Al-Khaleej (1) | Abha |
| 15:30 | Toko Ekambi 61'; Abdulelah S. (yellow card) 63'; Al-Mutairi (yellow card) 90+4' | Report | Martins 30', (yellow card) 69'; Rodrigues (yellow card) 50'; Al-Samiri (yellow card) 66'; Narey 83' | Stadium: Prince Sultan bin Abdul Aziz Stadium; Referee: Abdulsamad Bakri |

| 11 December 2023 28 | Al-Hilal (1) | 3–0 | Al-Taawoun (1) | Riyadh |
| 17:45 | Michael 45+2'; Mitrović 52'; Malcom 84' | Report | | Stadium: Prince Faisal bin Fahd Stadium; Attendance: 11,467; Referee: Andrés Merlos (Argentina) |

| 11 December 2023 25 | Al-Shabab (1) | 2–5 | Al-Nassr (1) | Riyadh |
| 21:00 | Al-Muwallad (yellow card) 20'; Carlos 24'; Saïss (yellow card) 62'; Al-Qahtani (yellow card) 70'; Bahebri 90' | Report | Fofana 17'; Mané 28'; Ghareeb 45+4'; Ronaldo 74'; Maran 90+6' | Stadium: Al-Shabab Club Stadium; Attendance: 10,387; Referee: Iván Barton (El Salvador) |

| 4 February 2024 27 | Al-Faisaly (2) | 0–4 | Al-Ittihad (1) | Riyadh |
| 18:15 | Cheikhi (yellow card) 21'; Al-Anzi (yellow card) 90' | Report | Hamdallah 45+4' (pen.); Kanté 54'; Hegazy 68', 80' | Stadium: Prince Faisal bin Fahd Stadium; Attendance: 3,167; Referee: Matthew Conger (New Zealand) |

== Semi-finals ==
The draw for the Semi-finals was held on 13 March. The dates for the Semi-finals fixtures were announced on 22 March 2024. All times are local, AST (UTC+3).

| 30 April 2024 29 | Al-Ittihad (1) | 1–2 | Al-Hilal (1) | Jeddah |
| 21:00 | Hegazi (yellow card) 30'; F. Al-Ghamdi (yellow card) 57'; Hamdallah 67'; Kadesh (yellow card) 90+5' | Report | Michael 25'; Milinković-Savić (red card) 42'; Mitrović (yellow card) 45+13'; Al-Bulaihi (yellow card) 50'; Abdulhamid 81'; Neves (yellow card) 90+3' | Stadium: King Abdullah Sports City; Attendance: 41,793; Referee: Benoît Bastien (France) |

| 1 May 2024 30 | Al-Nassr (1) | 3–1 | Al-Khaleej (1) | Riyadh |
| 21:00 | Ronaldo 17', 57'; Brozović (yellow card) 30'; Mané 37' (pen.), (yellow card) 89'; Al-Khaibari (yellow card) 53' | Report | Al Haydar (yellow card) 70'; Al-Torais 82' | Stadium: Al-Awwal Park; Attendance: 17,859; Referee: Maurizio Mariani (Italy) |

== Final ==
All times are local, AST (UTC+3).

31 May 2024
21:00 AST

| Al-Hilal | 1–1 (a.e.t.) | Al-Nassr |
|---|---|---|
| Mitrović 7' | Report | Yahya 88' |
Penalties
| Neves (penalty missed); Mitrović (penalty scored); Kanno (penalty scored); Tambakti (penalty scored); Al-Hamdan (penalty scored); Abdulhamid (penalty missed); N. Al-Dawsari (penalty scored) | 5–4 | (penalty missed) Telles; (penalty scored) Ronaldo; (penalty scored) Al-Najei; (penalty scored) Ghareeb; (penalty scored) Lajami; (penalty missed) Al-Hassan; (penalty missed) Al-Nemer |

King Abdullah Sports City, Jeddah
Attendance: 56,870
Referee: Darío Herrera (Argentina)

== Top goalscorers ==
As of 31 May 2024

| Rank | Player | Club | Goals |
|---|---|---|---|
| 1 | (Morocco) Abderrazak Hamdallah | Al-Ittihad | 4 |
| 1 | (Belgium) Yannick Carrasco | Al-Shabab | 4 |
| 1 | (Serbia) Aleksandar Mitrović | Al-Hilal | 4 |
| 1 | (Senegal) Sadio Mané | Al-Nassr | 4 |
| 5 | (Portugal) Cristiano Ronaldo | Al-Nassr | 3 |
