= Ramzi Solan =

Saudi Arabian footballer (born 1998)

Ramzi Solan رمزي صولان
Personal information
- Full name: Ramzi Fateh El Deen Solan
- Date of birth: 18 April 1998 (age 28)
- Place of birth: Jazan, Saudi Arabia
- Height: 1.70 m (5 ft 7 in)
- Positions: Right-back; winger

Team information
- Current team: Al-Kholood
- Number: 15

Youth career
- –2016: Al-Tuhami
- 2016–2018: Al-Faisaly

Senior career*
Years	Team	Apps	(Gls)
2016	Al-Tuhami	4	(1)
2018–2020	Al-Faisaly	11	(0)
2019	→ Al-Batin (loan)	8	(0)
2020–2025	Damac	50	(2)
2022	→ Al-Nahda (loan)	7	(0)
2022–2023	→ Najran (loan)	18	(0)
2025–	Al-Kholood	0	(0)

International career^{‡}
2016–2018	Saudi Arabia U20		
2019–2021	Saudi Arabia U23		
- * Club domestic league appearances and goals as of 22 April 2025 ‡ National team caps and goals as of 21 January 2019

Ramzi Solan (Arabic: رمزي صولان; born 18 April 1998) is a Saudi Arabian professional footballer who plays as a right-back or a winger for Al-Kholood.

== Career ==
On October 27, 2016, Solan left boyhood club Al-Tuhami and joined Al-Faisaly. Solan signed a 5-year professional contract with Al-Faisaly on January 31, 2018. On January 8, 2019, Solan joined fellow Pro League side Al-Batin on loan until the end of the 2018–19 season. On October 5, 2020, Solan joined Damac. On January 31, 2022, Solan was loaned out to FDL side Al-Nahda. On 8 September 2022, Solan joined Najran on loan.

On 27 August 2025, Solan joined Al-Kholood.

== Career statistics ==
=== Club ===
As of match played 28 May 2025

Club	Season	League		King Cup		Asia		Other		Total	
Club	Season	Apps	Goals	Apps	Goals	Apps	Goals	Apps	Goals	Apps	Goals
Al-Faisaly	2019–20	11	0	2	0	—		—		13	0
Al-Faisaly	Total	11	0	2	0	0	0	0	0	13	0
Al-Batin (loan)	2018–19	8	0	0	0	—		—		8	0
Damac	2020–21	4	0	0	0	—		—		4	0
Damac	2023–24	19	1	0	0	—		—		19	1
Damac	2024–25	27	1	1	0	—		—		28	1
Damac	Total	50	2	1	0	0	0	0	0	51	2
Al-Nahda (loan)	2021–22	7	0	—		—		—		7	0
Najran (loan)	2022–23	18	0	—		—		—		18	0
Career totals		94	2	3	0	0	0	0	0	97	2
