= Abdullah Hawsawi =

Saudi Arabian footballer (born 1996)

Personal information
- Full name: Abdullah Ahmed Mousa Hawsawi
- Date of birth: 1 February 1996 (age 30)
- Place of birth: Saudi Arabia
- Height: 1.77 m (5 ft 10 in)
- Position: Right-back

Team information
- Current team: Al-Najma

Youth career
- Al-Wehda

Senior career*
Years	Team	Apps	(Gls)
2016–2017	Louletano	5	(0)
2017–2018	Fátima	1	(0)
2019–2020	Al-Bukiryah	7	(0)
2020–2021	Al-Nojoom	28	(1)
2021–2024	Damac	45	(0)
2024–2025	Al-Kholood	32	(0)
2025–	Al-Najma	27	(0)
2026–	→ Al-Shabab (loan)	3	(0)
- * Club domestic league appearances and goals as of 30 October 2026

Abdullah Ahmed Mousa Hawsawi (Arabic: عبد الله أحمد موسى هوساوي; born 1 February 1996) is a Saudi Arabian professional footballer who plays as a right-back for Saudi Pro League side Al-Shabab on loan from Al-Najma.

== Career ==
Hawsawi started his career at the youth team of Al-Wehda. During the 2016–17 season, he moved to Portugal and joined CDP side Louletano. In July 2017, Hawsawi joined Fátima. On 20 July 2019, Hawsawi returned to Saudi and joined MS League side Al-Bukiryah. He made 7 league appearances for the club as Al-Bukiryah finished 4th and missed out on promotion to the Pro League. On 14 October 2020, Hawsawi joined MS League side Al-Nojoom. Following Al-Nojoom's relegation to the Second Division, Hawsawi left the club and joined Pro League side Damac on a two-year contract. He made his debut on 13 August 2021 in the 4–1 defeat to Al-Nassr.

On 13 July 2024, Hawsawi joined Al-Kholood on a free transfer. On 4 August 2025, Hawsawi joined Al-Najma.

== Career statistics ==
=== Club ===
As of 30 May 2024

Club	Season	League			National Cup		Continental		Other		Total	
Club	Season	Division	Apps	Goals	Apps	Goals	Apps	Goals	Apps	Goals	Apps	Goals
Louletano	2016–17	CDP	5	0	0	0	—		—		5	0
Fátima	2017–18	CDP	1	0	0	0	—		—		1	0
Al-Bukiryah	2019–20	MS League	7	0	1	0	—		—		8	0
Al-Nojoom	2020–21	MS League	28	1	—		—		—		28	1
Damac	2021–22	Pro League	18	0	0	0	—		—		18	0
Damac	2022–23	Pro League	20	0	1	0	—		—		21	0
Damac	2023–24	Pro League	7	0	0	0	—		—		7	0
Damac	Total		45	0	1	0	0	0	0	0	46	0
Career totals			86	1	2	0	0	0	0	0	88	1
