= Nicolae Stanciu (footballer, born 1993) =

Romanian footballer (born 1993)

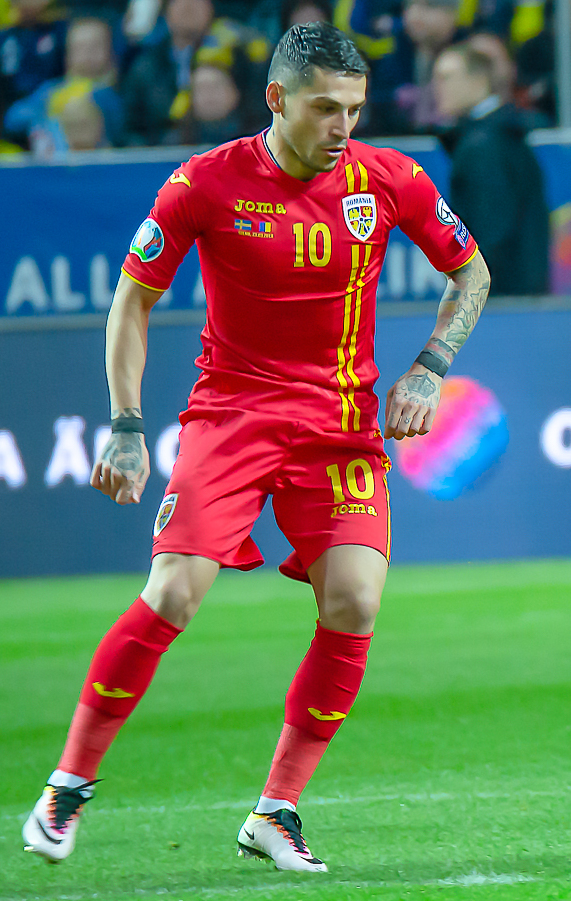
- Stanciu with Romania in 2019

Personal information
- Full name: Nicolae Claudiu Stanciu
- Date of birth: 7 May 1993 (age 33)
- Place of birth: Craiva, Romania
- Height: 1.70 m (5 ft 7 in)
- Positions: Attacking midfielder; winger

Team information
- Current team: Dalian Yingbo
- Number: 10

Youth career
- 2004–2008: Unirea Alba Iulia

Senior career*
Years	Team	Apps	(Gls)
2008–2011	Unirea Alba Iulia	36	(3)
2011–2013	Vaslui	47	(2)
2013–2016	Steaua București	90	(24)
2016–2018	Anderlecht	34	(5)
2018–2019	Sparta Prague	31	(10)
2019	Al-Ahli	10	(2)
2019–2022	Slavia Prague	77	(19)
2022–2023	Wuhan Three Towns	51	(11)
2023–2025	Damac	56	(9)
2025–2026	Genoa	4	(0)
2026–	Dalian Yingbo	27	(10)

International career^{‡}
2011–2012	Romania U19	6	(2)
2011–2013	Romania U21	13	(3)
2016–	Romania	90	(15)
- * Club domestic league appearances and goals as of 25 October 2026 ‡ National team caps and goals as of 5 October 2026

Nicolae "Nicușor" Claudiu Stanciu (Romanian pronunciation: [nikoˈla.e klaˈudju ˈstant͡ʃju]; born 7 May 1993) is a Romanian professional footballer who plays as an attacking midfielder or a winger and captains both Chinese Super League club Dalian Yingbo and the Romania national team.

Stanciu began his career at Unirea Alba Iulia in 2008, and went on to represent Vaslui and Steaua București in his country, winning six domestic honours and making a name for himself with the latter. He moved abroad for the first time in 2016, following a €9.8 million transfer to Anderlecht, which made him the most expensive signing of the Belgian First Division A and biggest sale of the Liga I at the time.

After winning a Belgian national title and a Super Cup, Stanciu joined Sparta Prague one and a half years later for another internal record fee, worth around an initial €4.5 million. He left the Czech Republic at the start of 2019 to sign for Saudi team Al-Ahli, only to return in that summer to the country at former rival club Slavia Prague, where he helped to back-to-back league titles and a Czech Cup in his first two seasons. Between 2022 and 2025, he competed professionally in China and again Saudi Arabia, before signing for Italian side Genoa.

Stanciu made his senior international debut for Romania in March 2016, in a 1–0 win over Lithuania, after having previously played for it at under-19 and under-21 levels. He represented the nation in two European Championships, in 2016 and 2024.

== Early life ==
Stanciu was born in the village of Craiva from Cricău, Alba County. He was raised mainly by his grandmother, who died in 2007 when he was only 14 years old. He dedicated his first senior national team goal to her.

== Club career ==
=== Unirea Alba Iulia ===
Stanciu joined Unirea Alba Iulia's youth system at the age of 11. On 25 May 2008, aged just 15 years and 18 days, he made his senior debut for the team by coming off the bench in a 4–1 victory over Corvinul Hunedoara in the Liga II championship. He spent the vast majority of the 2008–09 season on the sidelines, after suffering a long-term injury. On 1 May 2010, 17-year-old Stanciu made his Liga I debut under manager Blaž Slišković, playing 20 minutes in a 2–1 home win over Steaua București. In June, he was on trial with German side VfB Stuttgart, but the economic discrepancies between the two clubs made the transaction collapse.

On 20 March 2011, Stanciu scored his first goal for Unirea in a 3–0 success over Petrolul Ploiești, and he also wore the captain's armband in the closing stages of the match following Adrian Câmpeanu's substitution. His last goal came on 20 August with the side again in the second division, in the campaign opener against CSM Râmnicu Vâlcea. During his spell, other than VfB Stuttgart, he was tracked by various European clubs including Brescia, Celtic, and 1899 Hoffenheim.

=== Vaslui ===
On 9 September 2011, Liga I team Vaslui paid Stanciu's €200,000 release clause. Due to a transfer ban, "the Yellow-Greens" were initially unable to register the player and fellow league teams Dinamo București and Astra Ploiești tried to sign him.

On 4 March 2012, on his competitive debut for Vaslui, Stanciu scored the 2–1 winner at Petrolul Ploiești. In May 2012, after a series of good performances, he was included by website Sport.ro in a top 10 list of Romanian youths to watch. On 30 August, he netted from the penalty spot in a 2–2 away draw with Inter Milan in the play-off round of the UEFA Europa League, after his side had lost 0–2 in the first leg.

=== Steaua București ===
On 27 March 2013, Steaua București announced the signing of Stanciu for an undisclosed fee, rumoured to be worth €700,000, with the player agreeing to a five-year deal and a €20 million buyout clause. He played all twelve matches in the 2013–14 edition of the UEFA Champions League, scoring in the 2–2 away draw against Legia Warsaw in the play-off round which assured qualification to the group stage.

After the departure of Cristian Tănase in the summer of 2015, Stanciu took over his number 10 jersey. In February 2016, he extended his contract until 2021. The 2015–16 season was his most prolific individually at Steaua, as he netted 14 times from 39 competitive games.

On 3 August 2016, Stanciu scored twice against Sparta Prague in the Champions League third qualifying round's second leg. He also found the net in the first match, in an eventual 3–1 aggregate triumph.

=== Anderlecht ===
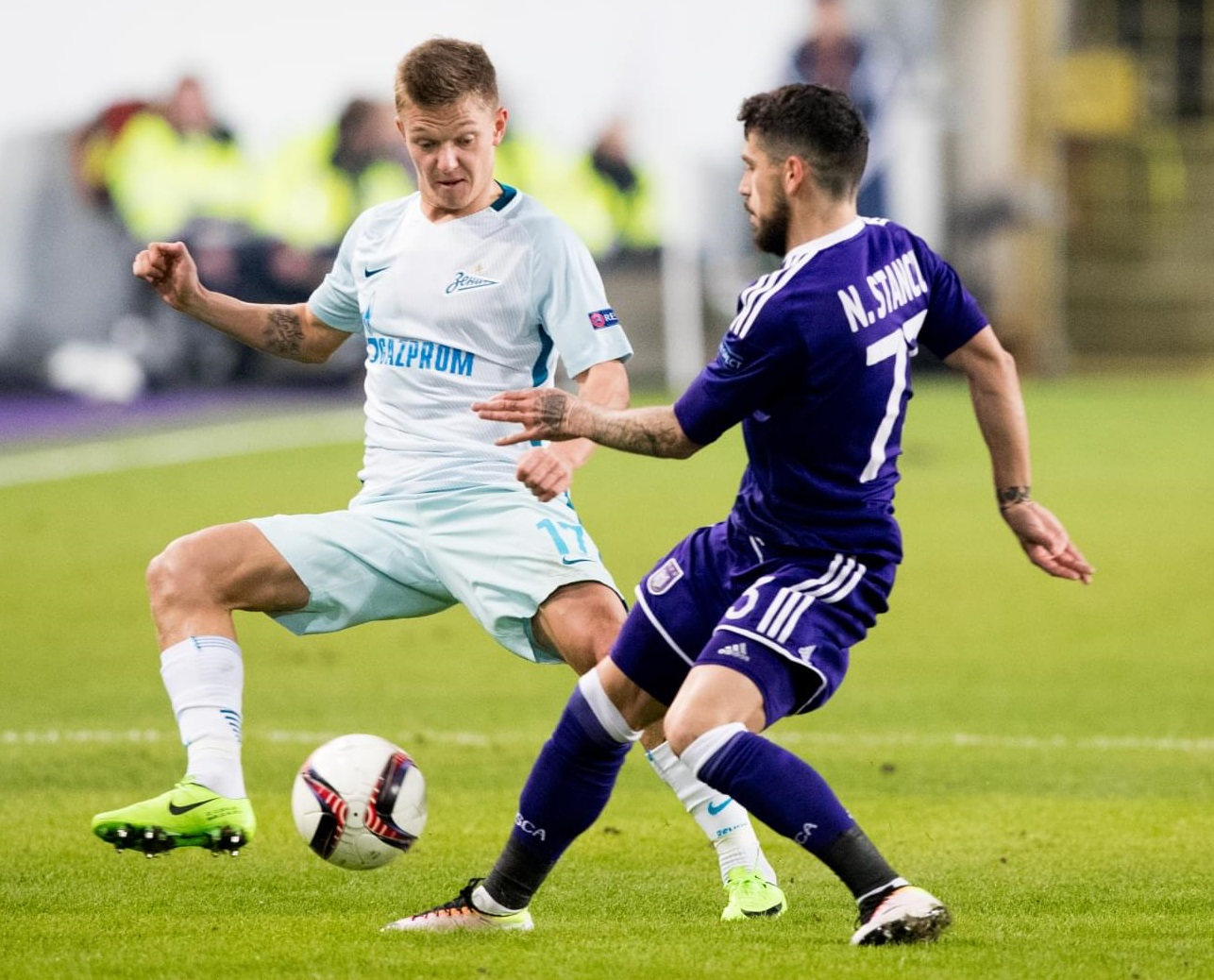
Stanciu (right) playing against Zenit Saint Petersburg in the Europa League round of 32, 17 February 2017.

On 29 August 2016, amid interest from various European sides including Chelsea, Stanciu travelled to Belgium to sign a five-year contract with Anderlecht. The transfer fee was worth an initial €7.8 million, potentially raising to €9.8 million after bonuses. Therefore, Stanciu became the then-most expensive player bought by a Belgian club, ahead of former record holder Steven Defour (€6 million, from Porto to Anderlecht in 2014). In November 2017, his agent confirmed that the additional €2 million had been paid, which also made him the Liga I's most expensive sale by surpassing the €9.5 million move of Vlad Chiricheș to Tottenham Hotspur in 2013.

Stanciu made his debut in the Belgian First Division A on 11 September 2016, starting in a 3–2 home victory over Charleroi and receiving a standing ovation as he was substituted in the 85th minute by Olivier Deschacht. His first goals for the club came on 3 November in a Europa League group stage match against Mainz 05, netting twice for a 6–1 win. On 5 December, he was sent off for the first time in his career after receiving two yellow cards in a 3–1 win over Kortrijk, having previously scored in the first half of the game.

Stanciu netted his first goal of 2017 in a 3–1 league victory against Sint-Truiden on 22 January, with his performance earning him the man of the match award. On 9 March, he scored the only goal of the game against APOEL in the Europa League round of 16's first leg. Stanciu ended his first season in Brussels with eight goals and eight assists in all competitions, as the team won the national championship and subsequently qualified for the next year's Champions League group stage.

Prior to the debut of the 2017–18 campaign, Stanciu changed his squad number from 73 to 10. On 22 July 2017, he was a starter in the 2–1 win against Zulte Waregem in the Belgian Super Cup.

=== Sparta Prague ===
Stanciu underwent a medical at Sparta Prague on 18 January 2018, and five days later penned a three-and-a-half-year deal for an undisclosed fee, rumoured to be worth a Czech record €4.5 million. Press speculated that Anderlecht could be entitled to another €4.5 million in add-ons. On his competitive debut on 18 February 2018, Stanciu helped to a 2–0 win against Slovan Liberec after scoring in the fifth minute. On 17 March, he netted twice before half-time in a derby with Slavia Prague, which ended 3–3. He finished the 2017–18 campaign with six goals from fourteen appearances, all in the Czech First League.

Stanciu played in both legs of the 2018–19 Europa League second qualifying round against Spartak Subotica, as his team was eliminated prematurely after 3–2 on aggregate. He netted his first goal of the season on 12 August 2018, converting a free kick in a 4–0 away victory over Teplice. In early December, after a series of poor results, he was supposedly among the eleven players who refused to train under coach Zdeněk Ščasný.

=== Al-Ahli ===
On 28 January 2019, Stanciu was transferred for a €10 million fee to Saudi Arabian club Al-Ahli. He recorded his debut in the Saudi Professional League on 7 February, in a 4–2 away win over Al-Hazem, and scored his first goal nine days later in a 2–2 Arab Club Champions Cup draw with Al-Wasl.

=== Slavia Prague ===
Amid financial issues at Al-Ahli, Slavia Prague acquired a reported 65% of Stanciu's economic rights for €4 million, with the player signing a four-year contract on 4 July 2019. He made his debut on 21 July, coming on as a 62nd-minute substitute for Josef Hušbauer and netting shortly after in a 5–1 away league win over Teplice. Stanciu then started in all eight matches of the Champions League, including the group fixtures against Barcelona, Borussia Dortmund and Inter Milan.

Stanciu amassed four goals and nine assists in 31 league appearances during the 2019–20 season, as Slavia Prague successfully defended its national title. He was the league's best assist provider, and also named the Foreign Player of the Year and the Midfielder of the Year. The following campaign, he aided with 16 goals from 45 appearances in all competitions, with his club finishing as champion of the Czech First League once more.

=== Wuhan Three Towns ===
On 15 February 2022, Stanciu joined Wuhan Three Towns, newly promoted to the Chinese Super League. He scored two free kicks on his second league appearance, helping to a 6–0 home thrashing of Guangzhou.

Stanciu was the third-best assist provider and scored ten goals in the league, as his side won the national title in his first season in China. On 8 April 2023, he played the full 90 minutes of a 2–0 victory over Shandong Taishan in the Chinese FA Super Cup.

=== Damac ===
On 8 September 2023, Stanciu returned to the Saudi Pro League by signing a two-year deal with Damac. He registered his debut six days later, starting in a 2–4 away league loss to Al Wehda. The following fixture on 21 September, he converted a free kick in a 1–1 home draw with Al Hilal.

=== Genoa ===
On 1 June 2025, Stanciu signed a contract with Genoa in Italy, beginning on 1 July. He scored his debut goal for the club on 15 August 2025, in a Coppa Italia match against LR Vicenza.

== International career ==
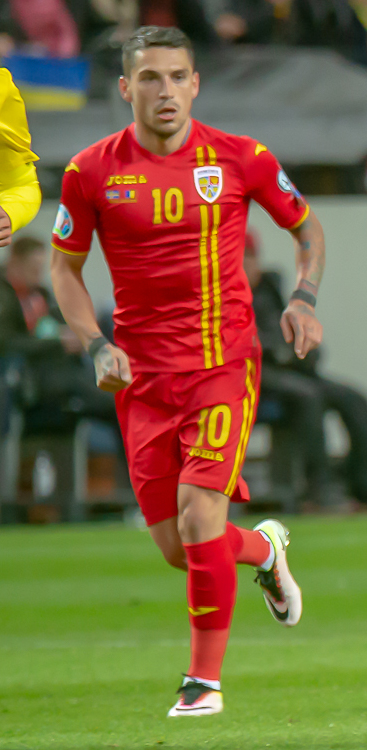
Stanciu playing for the Romania national team against Sweden, 23 March 2019.

Stanciu was selected in Romania's squad for the 2011 UEFA European Under-19 Championship. In the tournament opener, he featured the full 90 minutes against the Czech Republic, scoring in a 3–1 loss in an eventual group stage exit.

Stanciu earned his first cap for the full side on 23 March 2016, playing the second half of a friendly with Lithuania and netting the game's only goal at the Stadionul Marin Anastasovici. On 17 May, he was picked by manager Anghel Iordănescu for his preliminary 28-man UEFA Euro 2016 squad, and eventually made it to the final list after scoring four goals in only five friendly games. He was awarded the number 10 shirt at the tournament in France, and started in the opener against the hosts, gaining a second-half penalty that was converted by Bogdan Stancu in an eventual 2–1 loss; his other appearance was against Albania (90 minutes), the 0–1 defeat leading to group phase elimination.

On 4 September 2016, Stanciu assisted Adrian Popa as Romania scored their first goal of the 2018 FIFA World Cup qualifiers, in a 1–1 home draw to Montenegro where he also missed a late penalty. He made nine appearances and netted once, as the country finished fourth in the group phase.

In June 2021, Stanciu was one of two Romanian players who refused to take the knee before a friendly match away to England. He said he was protesting against a ten-match ban given to his Slavia Prague teammate Ondřej Kúdela, who reportedly racially insulted Rangers' Glen Kamara; Stanciu believed evidence was insufficient.

In 2023, Stanciu captained his nation in all ten matches of the Euro 2024 qualifiers, scoring three goals as Romania won its group undefeated. On 7 June 2024, he was named in the 26-man squad for the UEFA Euro 2024. On 17 June, he was awarded Player of the Match, in which he scored the first goal in a 3–0 win over Ukraine in the opening match, contributing to his country's first victory in the competition in 24 years. In addition, he became the first player to score in the European tournament whilst playing for a Saudi Arabian club, and second player from a non-European club following Vladimír Weiss.

== Style of play ==
Primarily an offensive-minded midfielder, Stanciu can also be deployed as a winger on both sides of the field, due to his ambidexterity. He is known for his playmaking skills, being described as having "good technique, a great shot, and vision of play."

In the months following his national team debut, Romanian press drew comparisons between Stanciu and former internationals Gheorghe Hagi and Adrian Mutu, both of which were highly regarded by him.

== Personal life ==
In 2012, Stanciu began a relationship with Andreea Beldean, a native of Alba Iulia. They married in 2018, and the wedding took place the following year.

Their first daughter was born in November 2020, and the second was born in June 2022.

== Career statistics ==
=== Club ===
As of match played 8 November 2026

Appearances and goals by club, season and competition
Club	Season	League			National cup (Note: Includes Cupa României, Belgian Cup, Czech Cup, King Cup, Chinese FA Cup, Coppa Italia)		League cup (Note: Includes Cupa Ligii)		Continental		Other		Total	
Club	Season	Division	Apps	Goals	Apps	Goals	Apps	Goals	Apps	Goals	Apps	Goals	Apps	Goals
Unirea Alba Iulia	2007–08	Liga II	1	0	0	0	—		—		—		1	0
Unirea Alba Iulia	2008–09	Liga II	2	0	2	0	—		—		—		4	0
Unirea Alba Iulia	2009–10	Liga I	5	0	0	0	—		—		—		5	0
Unirea Alba Iulia	2010–11	Liga II	26	2	2	0	—		—		—		28	2
Unirea Alba Iulia	2011–12	Liga II	2	1	—		—		—		—		2	1
Unirea Alba Iulia	Total		36	3	4	0	—		—		—		40	3
Vaslui	2011–12	Liga I	16	1	3	0	—		0	0	—		19	1
Vaslui	2012–13	Liga I	31	1	1	0	—		4 (Note: Two appearances in UEFA Champions League, two appearances and one goal in UEFA Europa League)	1	—		36	2
Vaslui	Total		47	2	4	0	—		4	1	—		55	3
Steaua București	2013–14	Liga I	29	5	2	0	—		12 (Note: Appearances in UEFA Champions League)	1	1 (Note: Appearance in Supercupa României)	0	44	6
Steaua București	2014–15	Liga I	28	6	5	1	1	0	9 (Note: Six appearances and two goals in UEFA Champions League, three appearances in UEFA Europa League)	2	1	0	44	9
Steaua București	2015–16	Liga I	28	12	4	1	2	0	4 (Note: Two appearances and one goal in UEFA Champions League, two appearances in UEFA Europa League)	1	1	0	39	14
Steaua București	2016–17	Liga I	5	1	0	0	0	0	4	3	—		9	4
Steaua București	Total		90	24	11	2	3	0	29	7	3	0	136	33
Anderlecht	2016–17	Belgian First Division A	24	4	2	0	—		12 (Note: Appearances in UEFA Europa League)	4	—		38	8
Anderlecht	2017–18	Belgian First Division A	10	1	1	0	—		3	0	1 (Note: Appearance in Belgian Super Cup)	0	15	1
Anderlecht	Total		34	5	3	0	—		15	4	1	0	53	9
Sparta Prague	2017–18	Czech First League	14	6	—		—		—		—		14	6
Sparta Prague	2018–19	Czech First League	17	4	1	0	—		2	0	—		20	4
Sparta Prague	Total		31	10	1	0	—		2	0	—		34	10
Al-Ahli	2018–19	Saudi Pro League	10	2	0	0	—		—		4 (Note: Appearances in Arab Club Champions Cup)	1	14	3
Slavia Prague	2019–20	Czech First League	31	4	1	0	—		8	0	—		40	4
Slavia Prague	2020–21	Czech First League	30	12	3	1	—		12 (Note: Two appearances in UEFA Champions League, ten appearances and three goals in UEFA Europa League)	3	—		45	16
Slavia Prague	2021–22	Czech First League	16	3	2	3	—		9 (Note: Two appearances in UEFA Champions League, two appearances in UEFA Europa League, five appearances in UEFA Europa Conference League)	0	—		27	6
Slavia Prague	Total		77	19	6	4	—		29	3	0	0	112	26
Wuhan Three Towns	2022	Chinese Super League	27	10	0	0	—		—		—		27	10
Wuhan Three Towns	2023	Chinese Super League	24	1	1	0	—		—		1 (Note: Appearance in Chinese FA Super Cup)	0	26	1
Wuhan Three Towns	Total		51	11	1	0	—		—		1	0	53	11
Damac	2023–24	Saudi Pro League	27	4	2	2	—		—		—		29	6
Damac	2024–25	Saudi Pro League	29	5	1	0	—		—		—		30	5
Damac	Total		56	9	3	2	—		—		—		59	11
Genoa	2025–26	Serie A	4	0	3	1	—		—		—		7	1
Dalian Yingbo	2026	Chinese Super League	27	10	3	3	—		—		—		30	13
Career total			463	95	39	12	3	0	79	15	9	1	593	123

=== International ===
As of match played 5 October 2026

Appearances and goals by national team and year
National team	Year	Apps	Goals
Romania	2016	11	5
Romania	2017	8	1
Romania	2018	9	4
Romania	2019	9	0
Romania	2020	6	0
Romania	2021	11	1
Romania	2022	2	0
Romania	2023	10	3
Romania	2024	13	1
Romania	2025	5	0
Romania	2026	6	0
Total		90	15

Scores and results list Romania's goal tally first, score column indicates score after each Stanciu goal.

List of international goals scored by Nicolae Stanciu
No.	Date	Venue	Cap	Opponent	Score	Result	Competition
1	23 March 2016	Marin Anastasovici, Giurgiu, Romania	1	Lithuania	1–0	1–0	Friendly
2	25 May 2016	Giuseppe Sinigaglia, Como, Italy	3	DR Congo	1–0	1–1	Friendly
3	29 May 2016	Olimpico Grande Torino, Turin, Italy	4	Ukraine	3–4	3–4	Friendly
4	3 June 2016	Arena Națională, Bucharest, Romania	5	Georgia	3–0	5–1	Friendly
5	8 October 2016	Vazgen Sargsyan, Yerevan, Armenia	9	Armenia	4–0	5–0	2018 FIFA World Cup qualification
6	13 June 2017	Cluj Arena, Cluj-Napoca, Romania	14	Chile	2–2	3–2	Friendly
7	24 March 2018	Netanya Stadium, Netanya, Israel	20	Israel	1–1	2–1	Friendly
8	31 May 2018	Sportzentrum Graz-Weinzödl, Graz, Austria	22	Chile	1–0	3–2	Friendly
9	10 September 2018	Partizan Stadium, Belgrade, Serbia	24	Serbia	1–1	2–2	2018–19 UEFA Nations League C
10	17 November 2018	Ilie Oană Stadium, Ploiești, Romania	27	Lithuania	3–0	3–0	2018–19 UEFA Nations League C
11	2 September 2021	Laugardalsvöllur, Reykjavík, Iceland	48	Iceland	2–0	2–0	2022 FIFA World Cup qualification
12	28 March 2023	Arena Națională, Bucharest, Romania	58	Belarus	1–0	2–1	UEFA Euro 2024 qualifying
13	12 September 2023	Arena Națională, Bucharest, Romania	62	Kosovo	1–0	2–0	UEFA Euro 2024 qualifying
14	15 October 2023	Arena Națională, Bucharest, Romania	64	Andorra	1–0	4–0	UEFA Euro 2024 qualifying
15	17 June 2024	Allianz Arena, Munich, Germany	71	Ukraine	1–0	3–0	UEFA Euro 2024

== Honours ==
Unirea Alba Iulia

- Liga II: 2008–09

Steaua București

- Liga I: 2013–14, 2014–15
- Cupa României: 2014–15
- Cupa Ligii: 2014–15, 2015–16
- Supercupa României: 2013

Anderlecht

- Belgian First Division A: 2016–17
- Belgian Super Cup: 2017

Slavia Prague

- Czech First League: 2019–20, 2020–21
- Czech Cup: 2020–21

Wuhan Three Towns

- Chinese Super League: 2022
- Chinese Super Cup: 2023

Dalian Yingbo

- Chinese Super League: 2026

Individual

- Gazeta Sporturilor Romanian Footballer of the Year: 2022; runner-up: 2016, 2021, 2023; third place: 2019, 2020
- Digi Sport Liga I Player of the Month: November 2015, March 2016
- Czech First League Foreign Player of the Year: 2019–20, 2020–21
- Czech First League Midfielder of the Year: 2019–20
- Czech First League Team of the Year: 2020–21
- Czech First League Fans' Player of the Year: 2020–21
- Czech First League Player of the Month: March 2021
- Czech First League Top Assist Provider: 2019–20
