= Dhari Al-Anazi =

Saudi Arabian footballer (born 2000)

Dhari Al-Anazi ضاري العنزي
Personal information
- Full name: Dhari Sayyar Al-Anazi
- Date of birth: 6 May 2000 (age 26)
- Place of birth: Hafar al-Batin, Saudi Arabia
- Height: 1.68 m (5 ft 6 in)
- Position: Left back

Team information
- Current team: Al-Shabab
- Number: 21

Youth career
- 2013–2015: Al-Batin
- 2015–2021: Al-Nassr

Senior career*
Years	Team	Apps	(Gls)
2021–2022	Al-Nassr	0	(0)
2021–2022	→ Al-Jabalain (loan)	15	(0)
2022–2026	Damac	95	(0)
2026–	Al-Shabab	9	(0)

International career
2015	Saudi Arabia U17		
- * Club domestic league appearances and goals as of 30 October 2026

Dhari Al-Anazi (Arabic: ضاري العنزي; born 6 May 2000) is a Saudi Arabian professional footballer who plays as a left back for Saudi Professional League club Al-Shabab.

== Club career ==
Al-Anazi began his career at the juniors team of Al-Batin. In 2015, Al-Anazi joined the youth team of Al Nassr. On 19 September 2019, Al-Anazi was chosen in the Saudi program to develop football talents established by General Sports Authority in Saudi Arabia. As part of the scholarship program, Al-Anazi was sent on a two-week trial with Spanish side Real Sociedad on 8 October 2020. On 23 May 2021, Al-Anazi was sent on a one-month trial with American side Los Angeles FC. On 3 August 2021, Al-Anazi returned to Saudi Arabia and joined Al-Jabalain on loan from Al-Nassr. On 1 February 2022, he returned to Al-Nassr after his loan was cut short.

On 20 July 2022, Al-Anazi joined Damac on a two-year deal.

== Career statistics ==
=== Club ===
As of 31 May 2024

Club	Season	League		King Cup		Asia		Other		Total	
Club	Season	Apps	Goals	Apps	Goals	Apps	Goals	Apps	Goals	Apps	Goals
Al-Jabalain (loan)	2021–22	15	0	—		—		—		15	0
Al-Nassr	2021–22	0	0	0	0	0	0	—		0	0
Damac	2022–23	12	0	0	0	—		—		12	0
Damac	2023–24	30	0	2	0	—		—		32	0
Damac	Total	42	0	2	0	0	0	0	0	44	0
Career totals		57	0	2	0	0	0	0	0	59	0
