= Sultan Faqihi =

Saudi Arabian footballer (born 1995)

Personal information
- Full name: Sultan Aboud Ali Faqihi
- Date of birth: 1 March 1995 (age 31)
- Place of birth: Saudi Arabia
- Height: 1.75 m (5 ft 9 in)
- Position: Right-back

Team information
- Current team: Al-Arabi
- Number: 14

Youth career
- Al-Nahda

Senior career*
Years	Team	Apps	(Gls)
2015–2020	Al-Nahda		
2020–2023	Al-Hazem	67	(3)
2023–2024	Damac	18	(1)
2024–	Al-Arabi	0	(0)
- * Club domestic league appearances and goals as of 27 May 2024

Sultan Faqihi (Arabic: سلطان فقيهي; born 1 March 1995) is a Saudi Arabian professional footballer who plays for Al-Arabi as a right-back.

== Career ==
Faqihi started his career at the youth team of Al-Nahda. He made his first-team debut during the 2015–16 season. On 24 January 2017, Faqihi signed his first professional contract with the club. On 31 January 2020, Faqihi joined Pro League side Al-Hazem on a three-year contract. On 10 August 2020, Faqihi made his Pro League debut for Al-Hazem by starting in the 2–1 home defeat to Al-Adalah. During the 2020–21 season, Faqihi made 23 appearances and scored twice as Al-Hazem were crowned champions of the MS League and once again earned promotion to the Pro League. On 7 June 2023, Faqihi joined Damac on a two-year contract. He made his debut for Damac as a second-half substitute in the 1–0 defeat to Al-Tai. On 2 September 2024, Faqihi joined Al-Arabi.

== Honours ==
Al-Hazem

- MS League/First Division: 2020–21, runner-up 2022–23
