= Noor Al-Rashidi =

Saudi Arabian footballer (born 1995)

Personal information
- Full name: Noor Obaid Al-Rashidi
- Date of birth: 12 March 1995 (age 31)
- Place of birth: Medina, Saudi Arabia
- Height: 1.80 m (5 ft 11 in)
- Position: Defender

Team information
- Current team: Damac
- Number: 4

Youth career
- –2016: Al-Ansar

Senior career*
Years	Team	Apps	(Gls)
2016–2020	Al-Ansar	-	(0)
2020–2023	Al-Wehda	18	(0)
2023–	Damac	16	(0)
- * Club domestic league appearances and goals as of 27 May 2024

Noor Obaid Al-Rashidi (Arabic: نور عبيد الرشيدي; born 12 March 1995), is a Saudi Arabian professional footballer who plays as a defender for Saudi Professional League side Damac.

== Career ==
Al-Rashidi started his career at the youth team of Al-Ansar and represented the club at every level. On 26 December 2019, Al-Rashidi joined Al-Wehda from Al-Ansar. On 18 July 2023, Al-Rashidi joined Damac on a free transfer.
