= Abdullah Al-Qahtani =

Saudi Arabian footballer

Personal information
- Full name: Abdullah Ibrahim Al-Qahtani
- Date of birth: 31 January 1999 (age 27)
- Place of birth: Saudi Arabia
- Height: 1.72 m (5 ft 8 in)
- Position: Winger

Team information
- Current team: Damac
- Number: 7

Youth career
- –2017: Abha

Senior career*
Years	Team	Apps	(Gls)
2017–2019	Abha	?	(1)
2019–2023	Al-Faisaly	24	(2)
2020	→ Abha (loan)	12	(1)
2021	→ Abha (loan)	10	(0)
2021–2022	→ Abha (loan)	10	(0)
2023–	Damac	35	(2)

International career
2018	Saudi Arabia U20		
- * Club domestic league appearances and goals as of 17 January 2026

Abdullah Al-Qahtani (Arabic: عبد الله القحطاني; born 31 January 1999) is a Saudi Arabian professional footballer who plays as a winger for Damac.

== Career ==
Al-Qahtani began his career at the youth teams of Abha. He made his debut for the first team during the 2017–18 season, where he helped them earn promotion to the First Division. On 31 January 2019, Al-Qahatani signed a five-year contract with Al-Faisaly. After making no appearances for Al-Faisaly, Al-Qahtani returned to Abha on loan from Al-Faisaly on 2 January 2020. On 27 January 2021, Al-Qahtani joined Abha on loan once again. On 31 August 2021, Al-Qahtani joined Abha on loan until the end of the season for the third time. On 28 July 2023, Al-Qahtani joined Damac.
