= Hassan Abu Sharara =

Saudi Arabian footballer (born 1997)

Personal information
- Full name: Hassan Ali Abu Sharara
- Date of birth: 3 May 1997 (age 29)
- Place of birth: Jizan, Saudi Arabia
- Height: 1.63 m (5 ft 4 in)
- Position: Winger

Youth career
- Al-Qadsiah

Senior career*
Years	Team	Apps	(Gls)
2017–2023	Al-Qadsiah	77	(3)
2019	→ Al-Kawkab (loan)		
2023–2025	Damac	5	(0)
2024	→ Al-Jabalain (loan)	5	(0)

International career
2018–2021	Saudi Arabia U23		
- * Club domestic league appearances and goals as of 12 August 2023

Hassan Abu Sharara (Arabic: حسن أبو شرارة, born 3 May 1997) is a Saudi Arabian football player who currently plays as a winger.

== Career ==
On 7 June 2023, Abu Sharara joined Pro League side Damac on a two-year contract. On 28 January 2024, Abu Sharara joined Al-Jabalain on loan.
