= Abdulaziz Makin =

Saudi Arabian footballer

Personal information
- Full name: Abdulaziz Mohammed Makin
- Date of birth: 29 June 2001 (age 25)
- Place of birth: Khamis Mushait, Saudi Arabia
- Height: 1.68 m (5 ft 6 in)
- Position: Midfielder

Team information
- Current team: Al-Wehda
- Number: 12

Youth career
- –2018: Damac
- 2018: Abha
- 2018–2021: Damac

Senior career*
Years	Team	Apps	(Gls)
2021–2024	Damac	29	(3)
2024–2025	Al-Faisaly	22	(1)
2025–	Al-Wehda	0	(0)
- * Club domestic league appearances and goals as of 27 May 2024

Abdulaziz Makin (Arabic: عبدالعزيز مكين; born 29 June 2001) is a Saudi Arabian professional footballer who plays as a midfielder for Al-Wehda.

== Career ==
Makin started his career at the youth teams of his hometown club Damac. He joined rivals Abha on 28 January 2018 where he spent 6 months before returning to Damac. Makin signed his first professional contract with Damac on 30 August 2021. He made his debut on 5 February 2022 by coming off the bench in the league match against Al-Faisaly. On 19 July 2024, Makin joined the First Division side Al-Faisaly. In September 2025, Makin joined Al-Wehda.
