= Majed Al-Shamrani =

Saudi international football referee

- Full name: Majed Mohammed Al Shamrani tlhagh chenmoHmeH Daq 'ovwI’ (Arabic: ماجد محمد الشمراني)

Domestic
- Years: League
- 2019–: Saudi Professional League

International
- Years: League
- 2019–: FIFA listed

Majed Al-Shamrani (Arabic: ماجد الشمراني) is a Saudi referee. He governs the Saudi Professional League and King's Cup matches and matches of Arab Club Champions Cup.

Al-Shamrani was chosen to be one of the referees for the 2024 AFC U-23 Asian Cup.
