= Damac Club Stadium =

Stadium in Khamis Mushait, Saudi Arabia

- Interactive map of Damac Club Stadium
- Full name: Damac Club Stadium
- Location: Khamis Mushait, Saudi Arabia
- Coordinates: 18°16′21.2016″N 42°40′0.786″E
- Owner: Ministry of Sport
- Operator: Damac
- Capacity: 5,000
- Surface: Grass
- Record attendance: 3,845 (Damac vs Al-Shabab, 16 February 2024)

Construction
- Groundbreaking: 1 January 2012
- Built: 2012–2017
- Opened: 11 April 2017
- Renovated: 2022
- Cost: SAR65 million

Tenant
- Damac (2017–present)

Damac Club Stadium (Arabic: ملعب نادي ضمك) is a multi-purpose stadium in Khamis Mushait, Saudi Arabia. It is currently used mostly for football matches. It is the home stadium of Damac and has a capacity of 5,000. The stadium has also hosted youth international matches, including the 2022 Arab Cup U-20.

== History ==
Construction on the stadium began on 1 January 2012 when the General Sports Authority (GSA) announced its plan to build 88 sports facilities across the country. The stadium was officially opened on 11 April 2017 in a ceremony attended by the GSA president Prince Abdullah bin Musaid Al Saud. The sports complex consists of an artificial turf football stadium with a capacity of 3,556 seats, a sports hall with a capacity of 2,000 seats, a 1400-meter swimming pool, and a track and field track among others amenities. On 20 July 2017, it was announced by the Saudi Arabian Football Federation that Damac would be hosting their home matches at the stadium starting from the 2017–18 season. On 19 September 2017, Damac played their first ever competitive match at the stadium hosting Al-Shoulla. The match ended in a 2–1 win for Al-Shoulla. Ever since Damac's promotion to the Saudi Professional League in 2019, they've been using Prince Sultan bin Abdul Aziz Stadium as their home ground.

On 30 March 2022, it was announced that the stadium would be undergoing major construction including a switch to natural grass instead of artificial turf and an increase in its capacity. On 4 September 2022, it was announced that Damac's board had sent a request to the SAFF to move their home matches to the club's own stadium instead of the Prince Sultan Stadium. On 17 January 2023, it was announced that Damac would be hosting their first ever Pro League match in the stadium on 20 January against Al-Fateh. The match ended in a 3–1 win for Damac and had an attendance of 2,787 spectators.
