= 2022–23 Al-Wehda Club season =

Al-Wehda
2022–23 season
- President: Sultan Azhar
- Manager: Bruno Akrapović (until 20 October); José Luis Sierra (from 20 October)
- Stadium: King Abdul Aziz Stadium
- SPL: 13th
- King Cup: Runners-up (knocked out by Al-Hilal)
- Top goalscorer: League: Anselmo; Fayçal Fajr; Karim Yoda (3 goals each); All: Anselmo (5 goals)
- Highest home attendance: 28,678 (vs. Al-Hilal, 2 March 2023)
- Lowest home attendance: 284 (vs. Al-Fayha, 31 May 2023)
- Average home league attendance: 6,712

The 2022–23 season was Al-Wehda's 77th year in existence and their first season back in the Pro League following their promotion from the FD League in the previous season. The club participated in the Pro League, and the King Cup.

The season covers the period from 1 July 2022 to 30 June 2023.

== Players ==
=== Squad information ===
As of 1 February 2023

Note: Flags indicate national team as defined under FIFA eligibility rules; some limited exceptions apply. Players may hold more than one non-FIFA nationality.

No.	Pos.	Nation	Player
1	GK	MAR	Munir Mohamedi
2	DF	KSA	Ali Makki
3	DF	KSA	Abdulelah Bukhari
4	MF	KSA	Waleed Bakshween (captain)
5	DF	KSA	Noor Al-Rashidi
6	DF	CRC	Óscar Duarte
7	MF	KSA	Hussain Al-Eisa
8	MF	KSA	Mohammed Al-Qarni
9	FW	FRA	Jean-David Beauguel
10	MF	LUX	Gerson Rodrigues (on loan from Dynamo Kyiv)
12	MF	KSA	Abdulkareem Al-Qahtani
13	GK	KSA	Abdulquddus Atiah
14	DF	ESP	Alberto Botía
15	FW	KSA	Azzam Al-Bishi
17	DF	KSA	Abdullah Al-Hafith
18	DF	KSA	Abdulrahman Al-Hajeri
20	FW	KSA	Jaber Asiri
21	GK	KSA	Ayman Al-Hussaini

No.	Pos.	Nation	Player
22	DF	KSA	Amiri Kurdi
24	DF	SDN	Abdulaziz Noor
27	DF	KSA	Islam Hawsawi
28	DF	KSA	Hamad Al-Jayzani
29	MF	KSA	Sultan Al-Akouz
35	MF	KSA	Yousef Al-Harbi
42	DF	KSA	Fahad Al-Jayzani
49	MF	KSA	Sultan Al-Sawadi
50	DF	KSA	Saad Al Khayri
57	FW	KSA	Waddah Al-Otaibi
66	GK	KSA	Basem Atallah
74	MF	FRA	Karim Yoda
76	MF	MAR	Fayçal Fajr
77	MF	KSA	Ahmed Fallatah
80	FW	KSA	Yahya Al-Najei
87	MF	BRA	Anselmo
88	MF	KSA	Alaa Al Hejji
90	MF	KSA	Hazzaa Al-Ghamdi

=== Out on loan ===
Note: Flags indicate national team as defined under FIFA eligibility rules; some limited exceptions apply. Players may hold more than one non-FIFA nationality.

No.	Pos.	Nation	Player
11	FW	KSA	Thamer Al-Ali (at Al-Ahli until 30 June 2023)
38	DF	KSA	Naif Kariri (at Al-Ahli until 30 June 2023)
70	DF	KSA	Ali Dagarshawi (at Al-Ain until 30 June 2023)

No.	Pos.	Nation	Player
99	FW	KSA	Sultan Hawsawi (at Al-Okhdood until 30 June 2023)
—	MF	KSA	Mohammed Al-Shalwi (at Al-Ain until 30 June 2023)
—	MF	KSA	Nawaf Hawsawi (at Najran until 30 June 2023)

== Transfers and loans ==
=== Transfers in ===
Entry date	Position	No.	Player	From club	Fee	Ref.
30 June 2022	DF	17	(Saudi Arabia) Abdullah Al-Hafith	(Saudi Arabia) Al-Ittihad	End of loan	
30 June 2022	MF	7	(Saudi Arabia) Hussain Al-Eisa	(Saudi Arabia) Al-Batin	End of loan	
30 June 2022	MF	8	(Saudi Arabia) Mohammed Al-Qarni	(Saudi Arabia) Al-Batin	End of loan	
30 June 2022	MF	10	(Australia) Dimitri Petratos	(Australia) Western Sydney Wanderers	End of loan	
30 June 2022	MF	12	(Saudi Arabia) Abdulkareem Al-Qahtani	(Saudi Arabia) Al-Tai	End of loan	
30 June 2022	MF	35	(Saudi Arabia) Yousef Al-Harbi	(Saudi Arabia) Al-Fayha	End of loan	
30 June 2022	MF	87	(Brazil) Anselmo	(Saudi Arabia) Al-Nassr	End of loan	
30 June 2022	MF	–	(Australia) Craig Goodwin	(Australia) Adelaide United	End of loan	
30 June 2022	FW	99	(Saudi Arabia) Sultan Hawsawi	(Saudi Arabia) Jeddah	End of loan	
1 July 2022	GK	1	(Morocco) Munir Mohamedi	(Turkey) Hatayspor	Free	
1 July 2022	DF	6	(Costa Rica) Óscar Duarte	(Spain) Levante	Free	
1 July 2022	MF	76	(Morocco) Fayçal Fajr	(Turkey) Sivasspor	Free	
1 July 2022	FW	9	(France) Jean-David Beauguel	(Czech Republic) Viktoria Plzeň	Free	
11 July 2022	MF	24	(Sudan) Abdulaziz Noor	(Saudi Arabia) Al-Nahda	Free	
16 July 2022	DF	18	(Saudi Arabia) Abdulrahman Al-Hajeri	(Saudi Arabia) Najran	Free	
26 July 2022	DF	22	(Saudi Arabia) Amiri Kurdi		Free	
1 September 2022	DF	50	(Saudi Arabia) Saad Al Khayri	(Saudi Arabia) Al-Ettifaq	Free	

=== Loans in ===
Start date	End date	Position	No.	Player	From club	Fee	Ref.
1 July 2022	End of season	MF	10	(Luxembourg) Gerson Rodrigues	(Ukraine) Dynamo Kyiv	None	

=== Transfers out ===
Exit date	Position	No.	Player	To club	Fee	Ref.
1 July 2022	FW	9	(Guinea) Ousmane Barry	(Saudi Arabia) Al-Okhdood	Free	
1 July 2022	FW	71	(Eritrea) Ahmed Abdu Jaber	(Saudi Arabia) Al-Shabab	Free	
1 July 2022	FW	–	(Saudi Arabia) Hussain Al-Maieni	(Saudi Arabia) Al-Taawoun	Free	
18 July 2022	DF	44	(Saudi Arabia) Hatim Belal	(Saudi Arabia) Al-Arabi	Free	
18 July 2022	MF	10	(Australia) Dimitri Petratos	(India) ATK Mohun Bagan	Free	
21 July 2022	MF	–	(Australia) Craig Goodwin	(Australia) Adelaide United	Free	
30 July 2022	DF	5	(Ivory Coast) Soualio Ouattara	(Saudi Arabia) Najran	Free	
1 August 2022	GK	1	(Saudi Arabia) Raghid Al-Najjar	(Saudi Arabia) Al-Taawoun	Undisclosed	
8 August 2022	MF	7	(Saudi Arabia) Mishari Al-Qahtani	(Saudi Arabia) Al-Qadsiah	Free	
21 August 2022	MF	6	(Saudi Arabia) Ali Al-Shaikhi	(Saudi Arabia) Al-Ain	Free	
3 September 2022	DF	12	(Saudi Arabia) Khaled Al-Sulami	(Saudi Arabia) Qilwah	Free	
6 January 2023	MF	24	(Saudi Arabia) Mubarak Al-Sqoor	(Saudi Arabia) Al-Okhdood	Free	

=== Loans out ===
Start date	End date	Position	No.	Player	To club	Fee	Ref.
5 August 2022	End of season	MF	50	(Saudi Arabia) Nawaf Hawsawi	(Saudi Arabia) Najran	None	
21 August 2022	End of season	DF	70	(Saudi Arabia) Ali Dagarshawi	(Saudi Arabia) Al-Ain	None	
21 August 2022	28 January 2023	MF	–	(Saudi Arabia) Mohammed Al-Shalwi	(Saudi Arabia) Al-Ain	None	
31 August 2022	End of season	FW	99	(Saudi Arabia) Sultan Hawsawi	(Saudi Arabia) Al-Okhdood	None	
4 September 2022	End of season	DF	38	(Saudi Arabia) Naif Kariri	(Saudi Arabia) Al-Ahli	None	
6 September 2022	End of season	FW	11	(Saudi Arabia) Thamer Al-Ali	(Saudi Arabia) Al-Ahli	None	
10 February 2023	End of season	MF	–	(Saudi Arabia) Mohammed Al-Shalwi	(Saudi Arabia) Al-Suqoor	None	

== Pre-season ==
25 July 2022 Friendly	Al-Wehda (Saudi Arabia)	1–0	(Spain) Minerva	Murcia, Spain
19:30 CEST	Naji	Report		Stadium: Pinatar Arena

29 July 2022 Friendly	Al-Wehda (Saudi Arabia)	0–1	(Spain) Intercity	Murcia, Spain
19:00 CEST		Report	Etxaniz 41'	Stadium: Pinatar Arena

2 August 2022 Friendly	Al-Wehda (Saudi Arabia)	0–1	(Spain) Hércules	Murcia, Spain
19:00 CEST		Report	Marín 64'	Stadium: Pinatar Arena

5 August 2022 Friendly	Al-Wehda (Saudi Arabia)	1–1	(Spain) Levante	Valencia, Spain
19:00 CEST	Duarte 30'	Report	Wesley 2'	Stadium: Ciudad Deportiva Levante UD

9 August 2022 Friendly	Al-Wehda (Saudi Arabia)	0–4	(Spain) Alcorcón	Murcia, Spain
19:00 CEST		Report	Borrego 7', 11', 65'; Berlanga 56'	Stadium: Pinatar Arena

14 August 2022 Friendly	Al-Wehda (Saudi Arabia)	0–3	(Spain) Real Murcia	Murcia, Spain
19:00 CEST		Report	Jara 23', 28'; González 80'	Stadium: Pinatar Arena

== Competitions ==
=== Overview ===
Competition	Record							
Competition	G	W	D	L	GF	GA	GD	Win %
Pro League	30	8	8	14	26	43	−17	26.67
King Cup	4	3	1	0	5	2	+3	75.00
Total	34	11	9	14	31	45	−14	32.35

Updated to match played 31 May 2023
Source: Competitions

=== Pro League ===
==== League table ====
Pos	Team	Pld	W	D	L	GF	GA	GD	Pts	Qualification or relegation
11	Al-Fayha (Note: Al-Fayha qualified for the AFC Champions League group stage as the 2021–22 King Cup winners.)	30	8	9	13	31	43	−12	33 (Note: Al-Fayha finished ahead of Abha on head-to-head points: Al-Fayha: 4 pts, Abha: 1 pts (Abha 1–1 Al-Fayha, Al-Fayha 2–0 Abha).)	Qualified for the AFC Champions League group stage
12	Abha	30	10	3	17	33	52	−19	33	
13	Al-Wehda	30	8	8	14	26	43	−17	32	
14	Al-Khaleej	30	9	4	17	30	44	−14	31	
15	Al-Adalah (R)	30	7	7	16	30	56	−26	28	Relegated to the First Division League

Updated to match(es) played on 31 May 2023. Source: SPL
Rules for classification: 1) Points; 2) Head-to-head points; 3) Head-to-head goal difference; 4) Total goal difference; 5) Total goals scored; 6) Fair-play points (Note: Head-to-head record is used only after all the matches between the teams in question have been played).
(R) Relegated

==== Results summary ====
Overall								Home						Away					
Pld	W	D	L	GF	GA	GD	Pts	W	D	L	GF	GA	GD	W	D	L	GF	GA	GD
30	8	8	14	26	43	−17	32	4	5	6	15	23	−8	4	3	8	11	20	−9

Last updated: 31 May 2023.
Source: spl.com.sa

==== Results by round ====
Round	1	2	3	4	5	6	7	8	9	10	11	12	13	14	15	16	17	18	19	20	21	22	23	24	25	26	27	28	29	30
Ground	A	A	H	A	H	A	H	A	H	A	H	H	A	H	A	H	H	A	H	A	H	A	H	A	H	A	A	H	A	H
Result	L	L	W	L	D	L	W	L	L	D	D	W	L	W	L	L	D	W	D	D	D	L	L	D	L	W	W	L	W	L
Position	12	12	11	12	12	12	11	12	12	12	13	12	13	12	13	13	14	13	13	13	13	13	13	13	13	13	13	13	12	13

Updated to match(es) played on 31 May 2023. Source: spl.com.sa
A = Away; H = Home; W = Win; D = Draw; L = Loss

==== Matches ====
All times are local, AST (UTC+3).

Win Draw Loss Postponed

27 August 2022 1	Al-Nassr	1–0	Al-Wehda	Riyadh
21:00	Aboubakar 3'; Al-Hassan (yellow card) 42'	Report	Duarte (yellow card) 45+1'	Stadium: Mrsool Park; Attendance: 19,312; Referee: Mohammed Al-Hoaish

1 September 2022 2	Al-Raed	1–0	Al-Wehda	Buraidah
19:00	Al-Fahad (yellow card) 58'; Mitriță 62'; René (red card) 90+1'	Report	Al-Jayzani (yellow card) 14'; Botía (yellow card) 34'; Bakshween (yellow card) 90+9'	Stadium: King Abdullah Sport City Stadium; Attendance: 3,081; Referee: Majed Al-Shamrani

8 September 2022 3	Al-Wehda	1–0	Abha	Mecca
21:00	Bukhari (yellow card) 25'; Natiq 49' (o.g.); Al-Sawadi (yellow card) 65'; Beauguel (yellow card) 80'	Report	Adam (yellow card) 71'	Stadium: King Abdul Aziz Stadium; Attendance: 3,118; Referee: Faisal Al-Blwi

16 September 2022 4	Al-Hilal	3–0	Al-Wehda	Riyadh
21:00	Marega 58'; Ighalo 79'; Vietto 89'	Report	Fajr (yellow card) 40'; Al-Rashidi (yellow card) 47'	Stadium: Prince Faisal bin Fahd Stadium; Attendance: 13,585; Referee: Artur Soares Dias (Portugal)

1 October 2022 5	Al-Wehda	1–1	Al-Ettifaq	Mecca
21:00	Beauguel 8'; Al-Eisa (yellow card) 48'; Botía (yellow card) 87'	Report	Özdemir 45', (yellow card) 62'	Stadium: King Abdul Aziz Stadium; Attendance: 2,237; Referee: Ahmed Al-Rumaikhani

6 October 2022 6	Al-Taawoun	2–0	Al-Wehda	Buraidah
18:30	Radif 45'; Al-Mutairi 88'	Report	Al-Qarni (yellow card) 14'; Bukhari (yellow card) 37'; Bakshween (yellow card) 90+2'	Stadium: King Abdullah Sport City Stadium; Attendance: 4,843; Referee: Mamdouh Al-Shahdan

10 October 2022 7	Al-Wehda	2–0	Al-Batin	Mecca
20:30	Botía 42', (yellow card) 90+2'; Al-Eisa 56'	Report	Nasser (yellow card) 15'; Al-Hurayji (yellow card) 53'	Stadium: King Abdul Aziz Stadium; Attendance: 761; Referee: Abdulsamad Bakri

16 October 2022 8	Al-Ittihad	1–0	Al-Wehda	Jeddah
20:30	Al-Aboud (yellow card) 44' (yellow-red card) 45+2'; Hegazi 80'; Hamed (yellow card) 82'	Report	Botía (yellow card) 37'; Rodrigues (red card) 85'; Al-Najei (yellow card) 90+4'	Stadium: King Abdullah Sports City; Attendance: 35,933; Referee: Radu Petrescu (Romania)

25 December 2022 10	Damac	0–0	Al-Wehda	Abha
15:30	Al-Nakhli (yellow card) 90+6'	Report	Al-Hafith (yellow card) 51'; Kurdi (yellow card) 82'	Stadium: Prince Sultan bin Abdul Aziz Stadium; Attendance: 356; Referee: Mohammed Al-Daqqash

30 December 2022 11	Al-Wehda	0–0	Al-Adalah	Mecca
18:00	Al Hejji (yellow card) 45+2'; Al-Qahtani (yellow card) 74'; Al-Hafith (yellow card) 90+7'	Report		Stadium: King Abdul Aziz Stadium; Attendance: 1,259; Referee: Mohammed Abu Shaqarah

5 January 2023 12	Al-Wehda	2–1	Al-Shabab	Mecca
20:30	Hawsawi (yellow card) 27' (yellow-red card) 90+3'; Al-Jayzani (yellow card) 40'; Fajr 53' (pen.); Al-Ghamdi 64', (yellow card) 76'	Report	Carlos 15'; Mina (yellow card) 52'	Stadium: King Abdul Aziz Stadium; Attendance: 2,765; Referee: Ahmed Al-Rumaikhani

13 January 2023 13	Al-Khaleej	3–2	Al-Wehda	Dammam
18:00	Cikalleshi 9'; Anthony (yellow card) 23'; Martins 70', 87'	Report	Anselmo (yellow card) 29'; Rodrigues 32'; Yoda 80'; Bakshween (yellow card) 90'	Stadium: Prince Mohamed bin Fahd Stadium; Attendance: 3,917; Referee: Sami Al-Jires

21 January 2023 14	Al-Wehda	1–0	Al-Tai	Mecca
18:00	Rodrigues 65'; Al-Ghamdi (yellow card) 78'	Report	Martínez (yellow card) 73'; Semedo (yellow card) 90+3'; Braga (yellow card) 90+5'	Stadium: King Abdul Aziz Stadium; Attendance: 2,112; Referee: Raed Al-Zahrani

27 January 2023 9	Al-Wehda	0–2	Al-Fateh	Mecca
20:30	Bakshween (yellow card) 40'; Duarte (yellow card) 64' (yellow-red card) 67'	Report	Al-Buraikan 25'; Batna (yellow card) 48', (goal) 90+3'; Buhimed (yellow card) 51'; Al-Khulaif (yellow card) 62'; Saâdane (yellow card) 64'; Al-Fuhaid (yellow card) 69'; Al-Zubaidi (yellow card) 87'	Stadium: King Abdul Aziz Stadium; Attendance: 2,455; Referee: Abdullah Al-Harbi

4 February 2023 15	Al-Fayha	2–0	Al-Wehda	Al Majma'ah
18:00	Ruiz 45+3' (pen.); Mandash 62'; Zidan (yellow card) 80'	Report	Anselmo (yellow card) 20'; Y. Al-Harbi (yellow card) 69'	Stadium: Al Majma'ah Sports City; Attendance: 2,068; Referee: Mohammed Al-Esmaiel

9 February 2023 16	Al-Wehda	0–4	Al-Nassr	Mecca
20:30	Yoda (yellow card) 77'	Report	Ronaldo 21', 40', 53' (pen.), 61'	Stadium: King Abdul Aziz Stadium; Attendance: 27,102; Referee: Sultan Al-Harbi

17 February 2023 17	Al-Wehda	2–2	Al-Raed	Mecca
20:30	Anselmo (yellow card) 23', (goal) 61'; Al Hejji 72'	Report	Tavares 34', 53'; Fouzair (yellow card) 44'	Stadium: King Abdul Aziz Stadium; Attendance: 889; Referee: Shukri Al-Hanfoush

24 February 2023 18	Abha	1–2	Al-Wehda	Abha
16:00	Bukhari 29' (o.g.); Amr (yellow card) 39'	Report	Fajr 9'; Hawsawi 19'; Bukhari (yellow card) 32'; Al Hejji (yellow card) 49'; Rodrigues (yellow card) 74'	Stadium: Prince Sultan bin Abdul Aziz Stadium; Attendance: 386; Referee: Abdulsamad Bakri

2 March 2023 19	Al-Wehda	3–3	Al-Hilal	Mecca
20:30	Duarte 24'; Bakshween (yellow card) 29'; Anselmo 57', (yellow card) 90+5'; Al-Akouz (yellow card) 90+2'; Al-Sawadi 90+9'	Report	Michael 2'; Ighalo 51'; K. Al-Dawsari (yellow card) 76'; Abdulhamid 90+3'	Stadium: King Abdul Aziz Stadium; Attendance: 28,678; Referee: Faisal Al-Blwi

9 March 2023 20	Al-Ettifaq	1–1	Al-Wehda	Dammam
16:00	Quaison 70' (pen.)	Report	Al Hejji 22', (yellow card) 29'; Bukhari (yellow card) 58'; Al-Hafith (yellow card) 76'; Kurdi (yellow card) 88'	Stadium: Prince Mohamed bin Fahd Stadium; Attendance: 1,270; Referee: Shukri Al-Hanfoush

17 March 2023 21	Al-Wehda	1–1	Al-Taawoun	Mecca
20:30	Duarte 65'; Yoda (yellow card) 89'	Report	El Mahdioui (yellow card) 38'; Tawamba 46'; Naldo (yellow card) 90+4'	Stadium: King Abdul Aziz Stadium; Attendance: 1,369; Referee: Sami Al-Jires

5 April 2023 22	Al-Batin	2–0	Al-Wehda	Hafar al-Batin
22:00	López 20' (pen.); Fawaz (yellow card) 44'; Bukia 79'; Pedroza (yellow card) 90'	Report	Al Hejji (yellow card) 46'; Fajr (yellow card) 65'	Stadium: Al-Batin Club Stadium; Attendance: 3,208; Referee: Mohammed Abu Shaqarah

9 April 2023 23	Al-Wehda	1–2	Al-Ittihad	Mecca
23:00	Kurdi (yellow card) 52'; Bakshween (yellow card) 63'; Beauguel 69'	Report	Hamdallah 20' (pen.), (yellow card) 84'; Henrique 30' (pen.); Hamed (yellow card) 42'; Hegazi (yellow card) 88'	Stadium: King Abdul Aziz Stadium; Attendance: 23,265; Referee: Artur Soares Dias (Portugal)

28 April 2023 24	Al-Fateh	1–1	Al-Wehda	Al-Hasa
19:00	Tello 13'	Report	Fajr 63' (pen.), (yellow card) 67'; Al-Akouz (yellow card) 79' (yellow-red card) 89'; Al Hejji (yellow card) 80'; Beauguel (yellow card) 90+2'	Stadium: Prince Abdullah bin Jalawi Stadium; Attendance: 9,257; Referee: Khaled Al-Teris

3 May 2023 25	Al-Wehda	0–2	Damac	Mecca
21:30	Yoda (yellow card) 39'	Report	Duarte (yellow card) 19'; Hamzi (yellow card) 58'; Soudani 65'; Chafaï 90+1'	Stadium: King Abdul Aziz Stadium; Attendance: 468; Referee: Sami Al-Jires

8 May 2023 26	Al-Adalah	1–2	Al-Wehda	Al-Hasa
19:00	Al-Hamdhi (yellow card) 46'; Godál 58'	Report	Anselmo (yellow card) 31', (goal) 90+4'; Yoda 45+2'; Al Hejji (yellow card) 57'; Bakshween (yellow card) 89'; Al-Ghamdi (yellow card) 90+5'	Stadium: Prince Abdullah bin Jalawi Stadium; Attendance: 14,557; Referee: Sultan Al-Harbi

18 May 2023 27	Al-Shabab	0–1	Al-Wehda	Riyadh
19:00	Santos (yellow card) 73'	Report	Yoda 13'; Noor (yellow card) 90+7'; Al Hejji (yellow card) 90+10'	Stadium: Prince Faisal bin Fahd Stadium; Attendance: 1,295; Referee: Mamdouh Al Shahdan

22 May 2023 28	Al-Wehda	1–4	Al-Khaleej	Mecca
21:30	Al-Ghamdi 20'; Duarte (yellow card) 57'	Report	Amaral 10'; Morato 18', 66'; Cikalleshi 58' (pen.); Al-Nowaiqi (yellow card) 87'	Stadium: King Abdul Aziz Stadium; Attendance: 3,911; Referee: Faisal Al-Blwi

27 May 2023 29	Al-Tai	1–2	Al-Wehda	Ha'il
21:00	Musona 11'	Report	Al-Hafith 34', (yellow card) 90+4'; Noor 78'	Stadium: Prince Abdul Aziz bin Musa'ed Stadium; Attendance: 5,859; Referee: Shukri Al-Hanfoush

31 May 2023 30	Al-Wehda	0–1	Al-Fayha	Mecca
21:00	Bakshween (yellow card) 90'; Noor (yellow card) 90+2'	Report	Mandash 90+4', (yellow card) 90+5'; Al-Safri (yellow card) 90+5'	Stadium: King Abdul Aziz Stadium; Attendance: 284; Referee: Abdullah Al-Harbi

=== King Cup ===
All times are local, AST (UTC+3).

20 December 2022 Round of 16	Damac	0–1	Al-Wehda	Abha
15:30	Al-Shamrani (red card) 62'; Maher (yellow card) 68'	Report	Fajr (yellow card) 80'; Anselmo 82'	Stadium: Prince Sultan bin Abdul Aziz Stadium; Referee: Mohammed Al-Beredi

14 March 2023 Quarter-finals	Al-Wehda	2–1	Al-Batin	Mecca
16:15	Bukhari (yellow card) 8'; Fajr 19' (pen.); Anselmo (yellow card) 43', (goal) 45+7'; Makki (yellow card) 45+2'	Report	Fawaz 39'; Nasser (yellow card) 43'; Al-Sohaymi (yellow card) 45+1'; Al-Qarni (yellow card) 82'	Stadium: King Abdul Aziz Stadium; Referee: Sultan Al-Harbi

24 April 2023 Semi-finals	Al-Nassr	0–1	Al-Wehda	Riyadh
21:00		Report	Beauguel 23'; Al-Hafith (yellow card) 24' (yellow-red card) 53'; Bakshween (yellow card) 60'; Al-Jayzani (yellow card) 88'; Munir (yellow card) 90+4'	Stadium: Al-Awwal Park; Attendance: 17,482; Referee: Radu Petrescu (Romania)

12 May 2023 Final	Al-Hilal	1–1 (a.e.t.) (7–6 p)	Al-Wehda	Jeddah
21:00	Al-Breik (yellow card) 42'; N. Al-Dawsari (yellow card) 71'; Ighalo (yellow card) 80'; Al-Bulaihii 90+9'; Jang Hyun-soo (yellow card) 112'	Report	Noor (yellow card) 31'; Yoda 35'; Al Hejji (yellow card) 51'; Al-Jayzani (yellow card) 94'	Stadium: King Abdullah Sports City; Attendance: 52,320; Referee: Szymon Marciniak (Poland)
	Penalties
	Carrillo (penalty missed); Ighalo (penalty missed); Al-Shehri (penalty scored); Al-Juwayr (penalty scored); Al-Hamdan (penalty scored); N. Al-Dawsari (penalty scored); Abdulhamid (penalty scored); Jang Hyun-soo (penalty scored); Al-Mayouf (penalty scored)		(penalty missed) Beauguel; (penalty scored) Bukhari; (penalty missed) Al Hejji; (penalty scored) Duarte; (penalty scored) Fajr; (penalty scored) Al-Naji; (penalty scored) Makki; (penalty scored) Kurdi; (penalty missed) Al-Ghamdi

== Statistics ==
=== Appearances ===
Last updated on 31 May 2023.

No.	Pos	Nat	Player	Total		Pro League		King Cup	
No.	Pos	Nat	Player	Apps	Goals	Apps	Goals	Apps	Goals
Goalkeepers
1	GK	(Morocco) MAR	Munir Mohamedi	25	0	22	0	3	0
13	GK	(Saudi Arabia) KSA	Abdulquddus Atiah	9	0	8	0	1	0
21	GK	(Saudi Arabia) KSA	Ayman Al-Hussaini	0	0	0	0	0	0
66	GK	(Saudi Arabia) KSA	Basem Atallah	0	0	0	0	0	0
Defenders
2	DF	(Saudi Arabia) KSA	Ali Makki	18	0	9+6	0	2+1	0
3	DF	(Saudi Arabia) KSA	Abdulelah Bukhari	18	0	13+2	0	2+1	0
5	DF	(Saudi Arabia) KSA	Noor Al-Rashidi	5	0	3+2	0	0	0
6	DF	(Costa Rica) CRC	Óscar Duarte	31	2	27	2	4	0
14	DF	(Spain) ESP	Alberto Botía	7	1	7	1	0	0
17	DF	(Saudi Arabia) KSA	Abdullah Al-Hafith	23	1	18+2	1	3	0
18	DF	(Saudi Arabia) KSA	Abdulrahman Al-Hajeri	1	0	0+1	0	0	0
23	DF	(Saudi Arabia) KSA	Amiri Kurdi	20	0	13+3	0	2+2	0
27	DF	(Saudi Arabia) KSA	Islam Hawsawi	24	1	15+7	1	2	0
28	DF	(Saudi Arabia) KSA	Hamad Al-Jayzani	19	0	12+5	0	1+1	0
42	DF	(Saudi Arabia) KSA	Fahad Al-Jayzani	4	0	3+1	0	0	0
46	DF	(Saudi Arabia) KSA	Mohammed Al-Subaie	0	0	0	0	0	0
Midfielders
4	MF	(Saudi Arabia) KSA	Waleed Bakshween	31	0	26+1	0	4	0
7	MF	(Saudi Arabia) KSA	Hussain Al-Eisa	10	1	3+6	1	0+1	0
8	MF	(Saudi Arabia) KSA	Mohammed Al-Qarni	4	0	2+2	0	0	0
10	MF	(Luxembourg) LUX	Gerson Rodrigues	16	2	14+1	2	0+1	0
12	MF	(Saudi Arabia) KSA	Abdulkareem Al-Qahtani	4	0	0+3	0	0+1	0
24	MF	(Sudan) SDN	Abdulaziz Noor	15	1	3+11	1	1	0
25	MF	(Saudi Arabia) KSA	Sattam Tambakti	0	0	0	0	0	0
29	MF	(Saudi Arabia) KSA	Sultan Al-Akouz	11	0	1+9	0	0+1	0
35	MF	(Saudi Arabia) KSA	Yousef Al-Harbi	1	0	1	0	0	0
49	MF	(Saudi Arabia) KSA	Sultan Al-Sawadi	19	1	9+8	1	2	0
57	MF	(Saudi Arabia) KSA	Waddah Al-Otaibi	1	0	1	0	0	0
74	MF	(France) FRA	Karim Yoda	28	4	21+3	3	4	1
76	MF	(Morocco) MAR	Fayçal Fajr	31	4	27	3	4	1
80	MF	(Saudi Arabia) KSA	Yahya Al-Naji	20	0	5+13	0	0+2	0
87	MF	(Brazil) BRA	Anselmo	32	5	28	3	4	2
88	MF	(Saudi Arabia) KSA	Alaa Al Hejji	26	2	17+5	2	4	0
90	MF	(Saudi Arabia) KSA	Hazzaa Al-Ghamdi	22	2	10+10	2	0+2	0
Forwards
9	FW	(France) FRA	Jean-David Beauguel	18	3	12+4	2	1+1	1
15	FW	(Saudi Arabia) KSA	Azzam Al-Bishi	3	0	0+3	0	0	0
20	FW	(Saudi Arabia) KSA	Jaber Asiri	0	0	0	0	0	0

=== Goalscorers ===
Rank	No.	Pos	Nat	Name	Pro League	King Cup	Total
1	87	MF	(Brazil)	Anselmo	3	2	5
2	74	MF	(France)	Karim Yoda	3	1	4
2	76	MF	(Morocco)	Fayçal Fajr	3	1	4
4	9	FW	(France)	Jean-David Beauguel	2	1	3
5	6	DF	(Costa Rica)	Óscar Duarte	2	0	2
5	10	MF	(Luxembourg)	Gerson Rodrigues	2	0	2
5	88	MF	(Saudi Arabia)	Alaa Al Hejji	2	0	2
5	90	MF	(Saudi Arabia)	Hazzaa Al-Ghamdi	2	0	2
9	7	MF	(Saudi Arabia)	Hussain Al-Eisa	1	0	1
9	14	DF	(Spain)	Alberto Botía	1	0	1
9	17	DF	(Saudi Arabia)	Abdullah Al-Hafith	1	0	1
9	24	MF	(Sudan)	Abdulaziz Noor	1	0	1
9	27	DF	(Saudi Arabia)	Islam Hawsawi	1	0	1
9	49	MF	(Saudi Arabia)	Sultan Al-Sawadi	1	0	1
Own goal					1	0	1
Total					26	5	31

Last Updated: 27 May 2023

=== Assists ===
Rank	No.	Pos	Nat	Name	Pro League	King Cup	Total
1	76	MF	(Morocco)	Fayçal Fajr	8	0	8
2	74	MF	(France)	Karim Yoda	3	0	3
2	88	MF	(Saudi Arabia)	Alaa Al Hejji	2	1	3
4	87	MF	(Brazil)	Anselmo	2	0	2
5	4	MF	(Saudi Arabia)	Waleed Bakshween	1	0	1
5	6	DF	(Costa Rica)	Óscar Duarte	0	1	1
5	9	FW	(France)	Jean-David Beauguel	1	0	1
5	29	MF	(Saudi Arabia)	Sultan Al-Akouz	1	0	1
5	80	MF	(Saudi Arabia)	Yahya Al-Naji	0	1	1
Total					18	3	21

Last Updated: 27 May 2023

=== Clean sheets ===
Rank	No.	Pos	Nat	Name	Pro League	King Cup	Total
1	1	GK	(Morocco)	Munir Mohamedi	5	1	6
2	13	GK	(Saudi Arabia)	Abdulquddus Atiah	1	1	2
Total					6	2	8

Last Updated: 18 May 2023
