= 2023 King Cup final =

- Event: 2022–23 King Cup
Al-Hilal	Al-Wehda
1	1
- After extra time Al-Hilal won 7–6 on penalties
- Date: 12 May 2023
- Venue: King Abdullah Sports City, Jeddah
- Man of the Match: Abdullah Al-Mayouf (Al-Hilal)
- Referee: Szymon Marciniak (Poland)
- Attendance: 52,320
- Weather: Clear; 31.4 °C (88.5 °F); 36% humidity

The 2023 King Cup final was the 48th final of the King Cup, Saudi Arabia's main football knock-out competition since its inception in 1957.

The final was played at the King Abdullah Sports City in Jeddah, on 12 May 2023. The match was contested by Al-Hilal and Al-Wehda. It was Al-Hilal's 18th King Cup final and Al-Wehda's 8th.

Al-Hilal defeated Al-Wehda on penalties in the final following a 1–1 draw after extra time to win their 10th title.

== Teams ==
Team	Previous finals appearances (bold indicates winners)
Al-Hilal	17 (**1961**, 1963, **1964**, 1968, 1977, **1980**, 1981, **1982**, **1984**, 1985, 1987, **1989**, 2010, **2015**, **2017**, **2020**, 2022)
Al-Wehda	7 (**1957**, 1958, 1959, 1960, 1961, **1966**, 1970)

== Venue ==
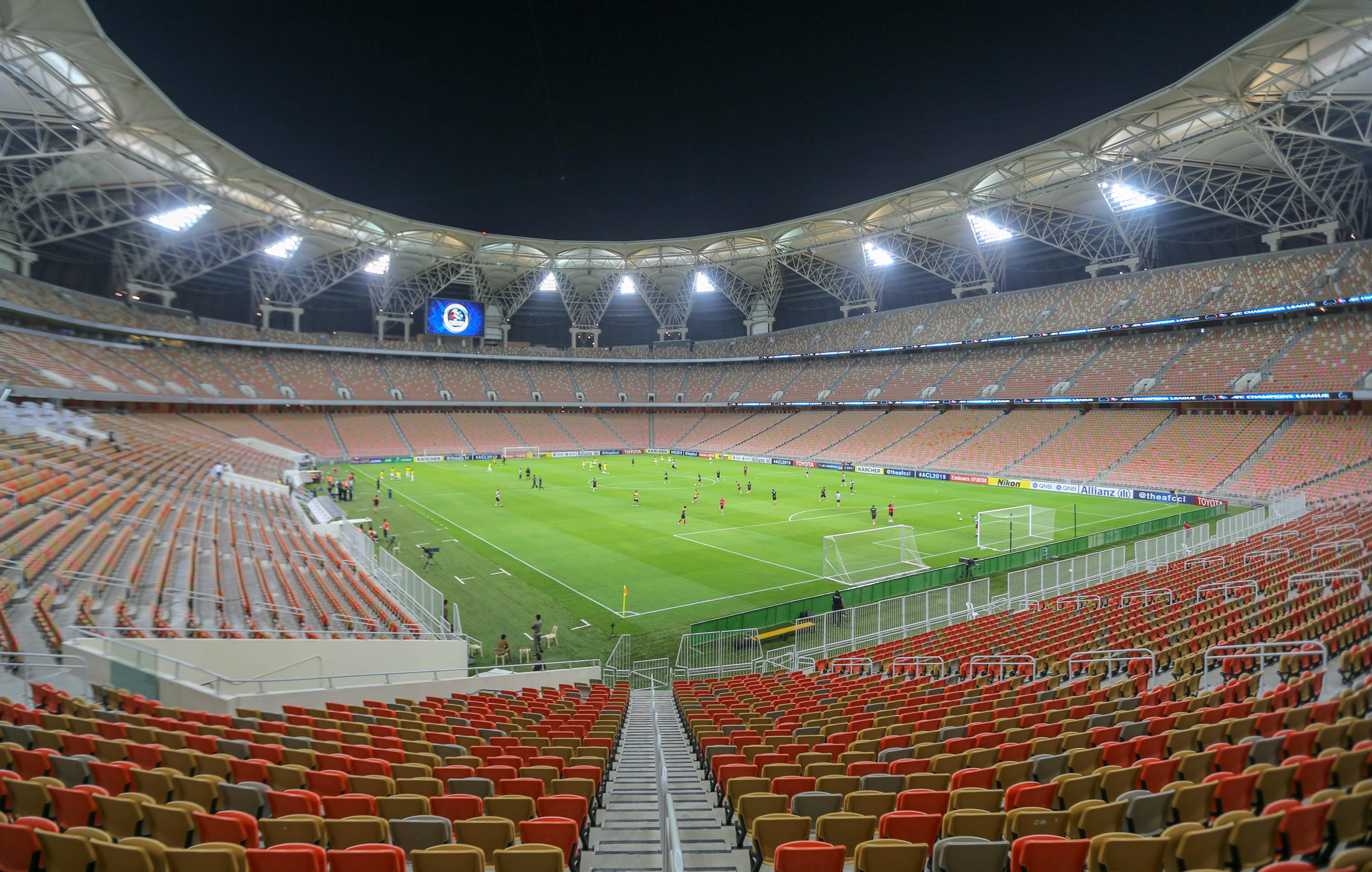
The King Abdullah Sports City in Jeddah hosted the final

The King Abdullah Sports City, also known as the Jewel Stadium, was announced as the venue of the final on 27 April 2023. This was the seventh time the King Abdullah Sports City hosted the final following those in 2014, 2015, 2016, 2017, 2018, and 2022 and was the fifteenth time it was hosted in Jeddah.

The King Abdullah Sports City was built in 2012, and opened in 2014 as the home of Al-Ahli, Al-Ittihad and the Saudi Arabia national team. Its current capacity is 62,345, and the record attendance was the opening match which was the 2014 King Cup final. The stadium also hosted many other finals including the 2019 Saudi Super Cup, the 2018 Supercoppa Italiana and the 2019–20 Supercopa de España.

== Background ==
Al-Hilal reached their record-tying 18th final after a 1–0 win against Al-Ittihad. This was Al-Hilal's second consecutive final, third final in four years, and sixth final since the tournament was reintroduced. Al-Hilal lost last season's final on penalties after a 1–1 draw against Al-Fayha.

Al-Wehda reached their eighth final after a 1–0 win against Al-Nassr. This was Al-Wehda's first final since the tournament was reintroduced in 2008. It was also Al-Wehda's first final since 1970, setting the record for the longest gap between final appearances at 53 years.

The two teams met twice earlier in the season with the first fixture ending in a 3–0 victory for Al-Hilal and the second ending in a 3–3 draw. This will be the second King Cup final between these two sides after the 1961 final which ended in a 3–2 win for Al-Hilal. This was the eighth meeting between these two sides in the King Cup with Al-Hilal winning six times and one draw between them. In the clubs' 103 previous meetings, Al-Hilal won 75, Al-Wehda won 8 and the remaining 20 were drawn.

== Road to the final ==
Note: In all results below, the score of the finalist is given first (H: home; A: away).

Al-Hilal		Round	Al-Wehda
Opponent	Result	2022–23 King Cup	Opponent	Result
Al-Ettifaq (H)	4–0	Round of 16	Damac (A)	1–0
Al-Fateh (H)	3–1	Quarter-finals	Al-Batin (H)	2–1
Al-Ittihad (A)	1–0 (a.e.t.)	Semi-finals	Al-Nassr (A)	1–0

== Match ==
=== Details ===
12 May 2023
21:00 AST

Al-Hilal	1–1 (a.e.t.)	Al-Wehda
Al-Bulaihi 90+9'	Report	Yoda 35'
Penalties
Carrillo (penalty missed); Ighalo (penalty missed); Al-Shehri (penalty scored); Al-Juwayr (penalty scored); Al-Hamdan (penalty scored); N. Al-Dawsari (penalty scored); Abdulhamid (penalty scored); Jang Hyun-soo (penalty scored); Al-Mayouf (penalty scored)	7–6	(penalty missed) Beauguel; (penalty scored) Bukhari; (penalty missed) Al Hejji; (penalty scored) Duarte; (penalty scored) Fajr; (penalty scored) Al-Naji; (penalty scored) Makki; (penalty scored) Kurdi; (penalty missed) Al-Ghamdi

King Abdullah Sports City, Jeddah
Attendance: 52,320
Referee: Szymon Marciniak (Poland)

**Al-Hilal**	**Al-Wehda**

GK	1	(Saudi Arabia) Abdullah Al-Mayouf (c)
RB	2	(Saudi Arabia) Mohammed Al-Breik	(yellow card) 42'	(substituted off) 46'
CB	20	(South Korea) Jang Hyun-soo	(yellow card) 112'
CB	5	(Saudi Arabia) Ali Al-Bulaihi
LB	12	(Saudi Arabia) Yasser Al-Shahrani		(substituted off) 83'
DM	8	(Saudi Arabia) Abdullah Otayf		(substituted off) 46'
CM	19	(Peru) André Carrillo
CM	28	(Saudi Arabia) Mohamed Kanno		(substituted off) 46'
RF	17	(Mali) Moussa Marega		(substituted off) 114'
CF	10	(Argentina) Luciano Vietto		(substituted off) 83'
LF	96	(Brazil) Michael
Substitutes:
GK	21	(Saudi Arabia) Mohammed Al-Owais
DF	4	(Saudi Arabia) Khalifah Al-Dawsari
DF	66	(Saudi Arabia) Saud Abdulhamid		(substituted in) 46'
DF	70	(Saudi Arabia) Mohammed Jahfali
MF	16	(Saudi Arabia) Nasser Al-Dawsari	(yellow card) 71'	(substituted in) 46'
MF	43	(Saudi Arabia) Musab Al-Juwayr		(substituted in) 83'
FW	9	(Nigeria) Odion Ighalo	(yellow card) 80'	(substituted in) 46'
FW	11	(Saudi Arabia) Saleh Al-Shehri		(substituted in) 114'
FW	14	(Saudi Arabia) Abdullah Al-Hamdan		(substituted in) 83'
Manager:
(Argentina) Ramón Díaz

GK	1	(Morocco) Munir Mohamedi
RB	28	(Saudi Arabia) Hamad Al-Jayzani	(yellow card) 94'	(substituted off) 105'
CB	2	(Saudi Arabia) Ali Makki
CB	6	(Costa Rica) Óscar Duarte
LB	27	(Saudi Arabia) Islam Hawsawi		(substituted off) 90'
DM	4	(Saudi Arabia) Waleed Bakshween (c)		(substituted off) 71'
CM	76	(Morocco) Fayçal Fajr
CM	88	(Saudi Arabia) Alaa Al Hejji	(yellow card) 51'
RF	24	(Sudan) Abdulaziz Noor	(yellow card) 31'	(substituted off) 55'
CF	74	(France) Karim Yoda		(substituted off) 90'
LF	87	(Brazil) Anselmo
Substitutes:
GK	13	(Saudi Arabia) Abdulquddus Atiah
DF	3	(Saudi Arabia) Abdulelah Bukhari		(substituted in) 90'
DF	23	(Saudi Arabia) Amiri Kurdi		(substituted in) 90'
MF	12	(Saudi Arabia) Abdulkareem Al-Qahtani
MF	29	(Saudi Arabia) Sultan Al-Akouz
MF	49	(Saudi Arabia) Sultan Al-Sawadi
MF	80	(Saudi Arabia) Yahya Al-Naji		(substituted in) 55'
MF	90	(Saudi Arabia) Hazzaa Al-Ghamdi		(substituted in) 105'
FW	9	(France) Jean-David Beauguel		(substituted in) 71'
Manager:
(Chile) José Luis Sierra

Man of the Match:
Abdullah Al-Mayouf (Al-Hilal)

Assistant referees:
Paweł Sokolnicki (Poland)
Tomasz Listkiewicz (Poland)
Fourth official:
Faisal Al-Blwi
Video assistant referee:
Tomasz Kwiatkowski (Poland)
Assistant video assistant referee:
Omar Al-Jamal

**Match rules**

- 90 minutes
- 30 minutes of extra time if necessary
- Penalty shoot-out if scores still level
- Nine named substitutes
- Maximum of five substitutions, with a sixth allowed in extra time.

== See also ==
- 2022–23 King Cup
- 2022–23 Saudi Professional League
- 2023 Saudi Super Cup
