= 2023–24 Al-Wehda Club season =

Al-Wehda
2023–24 season
- President: Sultan Azhar
- Manager: Georgios Donis
- Stadium: King Abdul Aziz Stadium
- Pro League: 13th
- King Cup: Round of 16 (knocked out by Al-Taawoun)
- Super Cup: Semi-finals (knocked out by Al-Ittihad)
- Top goalscorer: League: Odion Ighalo (15); All: Odion Ighalo (16)
- Highest home attendance: 10,727 v Al-Nassr; 11 November 2023; Saudi Pro League
- Lowest home attendance: 365 v Al-Fateh; 30 March 2024; Saudi Pro League
- Average home league attendance: 2,633

The 2023–24 season was Al-Wehda's 39th non-consecutive season in the top flight of Saudi football and 78th year in existence as a football club. The club participated in the Pro League, the King Cup, and the Saudi Super Cup.

The season covers the period from 1 July 2023 to 30 June 2024.

== Players ==
=== Squad information ===
As of 1 February 2024

Note: Flags indicate national team as defined under FIFA eligibility rules; some limited exceptions apply. Players may hold more than one non-FIFA nationality.

No.	Pos.	Nation	Player
1	GK	MAR	Munir Mohamedi
2	DF	KSA	Saeed Al-Muwallad
3	DF	KSA	Abdulelah Bukhari
4	MF	KSA	Waleed Bakshween (captain)
5	DF	MAR	Jawad El Yamiq
6	DF	CRC	Óscar Duarte
7	FW	NED	Vito van Crooij
8	MF	KSA	Mohammed Al-Qarni
9	FW	NGR	Odion Ighalo
11	MF	KSA	Sultan Al-Akouz
12	MF	KSA	Abdulkareem Al-Qahtani
13	GK	KSA	Abdulquddus Atiah
15	FW	KSA	Azzam Al-Bishi
16	MF	KSA	Nawaf Al-Azizi
17	DF	KSA	Abdullah Al-Hafith

No.	Pos.	Nation	Player
18	DF	KSA	Abdulrahman Al-Hajeri
20	FW	KSA	Jaber Asiri
21	GK	KSA	Ayman Al-Hussaini
22	DF	KSA	Ali Makki
23	FW	AUS	Craig Goodwin
24	MF	SDN	Abdulaziz Noor
27	DF	KSA	Islam Hawsawi
28	MF	KSA	Hussain Al-Eisa
35	MF	KSA	Yousef Al-Harbi
38	DF	KSA	Naif Kariri
76	MF	MAR	Fayçal Fajr
80	FW	KSA	Yahya Al-Najei
87	MF	BRA	Anselmo
88	MF	KSA	Alaa Al Hejji
90	MF	KSA	Hazzaa Al-Ghamdi

=== Out on loan ===
Note: Flags indicate national team as defined under FIFA eligibility rules; some limited exceptions apply. Players may hold more than one non-FIFA nationality.

No.	Pos.	Nation	Player
25	MF	KSA	Sattam Al-Tambakti (at Al-Ain until 30 June 2024)
33	DF	KSA	Rakan Al-Harbi (at Al-Najran until 30 June 2024)
50	DF	KSA	Saad Al Khayri (at Al-Safa until 30 June 2024)

No.	Pos.	Nation	Player
55	MF	KSA	Nawaf Hawsawi (at Jeddah until 30 June 2024)
60	MF	KSA	Mohammed Al-Shalwi (at Al-Entesar until 30 June 2024)
99	FW	KSA	Sultan Hawsawi (at Al-Qaisumah until 30 June 2024)

== Transfers and loans ==
=== Transfers in ===
Entry date	Position	No.	Player	From club	Fee	Ref.
30 June 2023	DF	38	(Saudi Arabia) Naif Kariri	(Saudi Arabia) Al-Ahli	End of loan	
30 June 2023	DF	70	(Saudi Arabia) Ali Dagarshawi	(Saudi Arabia) Al-Ain	End of loan	
30 June 2023	MF	55	(Saudi Arabia) Nawaf Hawsawi	(Saudi Arabia) Najran	End of loan	
30 June 2023	MF	–	(Saudi Arabia) Mohammed Al-Shalwi	(Saudi Arabia) Al-Suqoor	End of loan	
30 June 2023	FW	99	(Saudi Arabia) Sultan Hawsawi	(Saudi Arabia) Al-Okhdood	End of loan	
30 June 2023	FW	–	(Saudi Arabia) Thamer Al-Ali	(Saudi Arabia) Al-Ahli	End of loan	
13 August 2023	DF	2	(Saudi Arabia) Saeed Al-Muwallad	(Saudi Arabia) Al-Ettifaq	Free	
15 August 2023	FW	9	(Nigeria) Odion Ighalo	(Saudi Arabia) Al-Hilal	Free	
16 August 2023	DF	5	(Morocco) Jawad El Yamiq	(Spain) Real Valladolid	$1,100,000	
18 August 2023	MF	16	(Saudi Arabia) Nawaf Al-Azizi	(Saudi Arabia) Al-Jabalain	Undisclosed	
7 September 2023	FW	7	(Netherlands) Vito van Crooij	(Netherlands) Sparta Rotterdam	$2,142,000	
8 September 2023	FW	23	(Australia) Craig Goodwin	(Australia) Adelaide United	$800,000	

=== Transfers out ===
Exit date	Position	No.	Player	To club	Fee	Ref.
30 June 2023	MF	10	(Luxembourg) Gerson Rodrigues	(Ukraine) Dynamo Kyiv	End of loan	
1 July 2023	MF	74	(France) Karim Yoda	(Saudi Arabia) Al-Adalah	Free	
13 July 2023	DF	28	(Saudi Arabia) Hamad Al-Jayzani	(Saudi Arabia) Al-Raed	Free	
18 July 2023	DF	5	(Saudi Arabia) Noor Al-Rashidi	(Saudi Arabia) Damac	Free	
26 July 2023	DF	14	(Spain) Alberto Botía	(Greece) Kifisia	Free	
29 July 2023	DF	70	(Saudi Arabia) Ali Dagarshawi	(Saudi Arabia) Al-Ain	Free	
2 August 2023	MF	–	(Saudi Arabia) Hatem Fallatah	(Saudi Arabia) Al-Lewaa	Free	
7 August 2023	DF	22	(Saudi Arabia) Amiri Kurdi	(Saudi Arabia) Al-Riyadh	Free	
17 September 2023	MF	77	(Saudi Arabia) Ahmed Fallatah	(Saudi Arabia) Al-Faisaly	Free	
19 September 2023	MF	49	(Saudi Arabia) Sultan Al-Sawadi	(Saudi Arabia) Al-Suqoor	Free	
30 January 2024	GK	66	(Saudi Arabia) Basem Atallah	(Saudi Arabia) Al-Arabi	Free	
1 February 2024	MF	57	(Saudi Arabia) Waddah Al-Otaibi	(Saudi Arabia) Wej	Free	
24 February 2024	FW	9	(France) Jean-David Beauguel	(China) Qingdao West Coast	Free	

=== Loans out ===
Start date	End date	Position	No.	Player	To club	Fee	Ref.
13 September 2023	End of season	DF	33	(Saudi Arabia) Rakan Al-Harbi	(Saudi Arabia) Najran	None	
12 September 2023	End of season	MF	25	(Saudi Arabia) Sattam Tambakti	(Saudi Arabia) Al-Ain	None	
15 September 2023	End of season	FW	99	(Saudi Arabia) Sultan Hawsawi	(Saudi Arabia) Al-Qaisumah	None	
1 October 2023	End of season	MF	60	(Saudi Arabia) Mohammed Al-Shalwi	(Saudi Arabia) Al-Entesar	None	
1 February 2024	End of season	DF	50	(Saudi Arabia) Saad Al-Khayri	(Saudi Arabia) Al-Safa	None	
1 February 2024	End of season	MF	55	(Saudi Arabia) Nawaf Hawsawi	(Saudi Arabia) Jeddah	None	

== Pre-season ==
23 July 2023 Friendly	Al-Wehda (Saudi Arabia)	2–1	(Serbia) FK Brodarac	Užice, Serbia
18:30 CEST	Al-Hafith; Al-Ghamdi		Bašanović	Stadium: Radomir Antić Stadium

27 July 2023 Friendly	Al-Wehda (Saudi Arabia)	0–2	(United Arab Emirates) Shabab Al Ahli	Stara Pazova, Serbia
18:00 CEST		Report	Cartabia; Dabbur	Stadium: Sportski Centar FSS

31 July 2023 Friendly	Al-Wehda (Saudi Arabia)	0–2	(Serbia) FK Metalac Gornji Milanovac	Gornji Milanovac, Serbia
18:00 CEST		Report	Aleksić 46'; Ilić 70'	Stadium: Stadion Metalac

== Competitions ==
=== Overview ===
Competition	Record							
Competition	G	W	D	L	GF	GA	GD	Win %
Pro League	34	10	6	18	45	60	−15	29.41
King Cup	2	1	0	1	2	2	+0	50.00
Super Cup	1	0	0	1	1	2	−1	0.00
Total	37	11	6	20	48	64	−16	29.73

Updated to match played 27 May 2024
Source: Competitions

=== Pro League ===
==== League table ====
Pos	Team	Pld	W	D	L	GF	GA	GD	Pts
11	Al-Khaleej	34	9	10	15	36	47	−11	37 (Note: Al-Khaleej finished ahead of Al-Raed on head-to-head points: Al-Khaleej: 4 pts, Al-Raed: 1 pts (Al-Khaleej 0–0 Al-Raed, Al-Raed 0–1 Al-Khaleej).)
12	Al-Raed	34	9	10	15	41	49	−8	37
13	Al-Wehda	34	10	6	18	45	60	−15	36
14	Al-Riyadh	34	8	11	15	33	57	−24	35
15	Al-Okhdood	34	9	6	19	33	52	−19	33

Source: SPL
Rules for classification: 1) Points; 2) Head-to-head points; 3) Head-to-head goal difference; 4) Total goal difference; 5) Total goals scored; 6) Fair-play points
(Note: Head-to-head record is used only after all the matches between the teams in question have been played).

==== Results summary ====
Overall								Home						Away					
Pld	W	D	L	GF	GA	GD	Pts	W	D	L	GF	GA	GD	W	D	L	GF	GA	GD
34	10	6	18	45	60	−15	36	6	4	7	31	28	+3	4	2	11	14	32	−18

Last updated: 27 May 2024.
Source: spl.com.sa

==== Results by round ====
Round	1	2	3	4	5	6	7	8	9	10	11	12	13	14	15	16	17	18	19	20	21	22	23	24	25	26	27	28	29	30	31	32	33	34
Ground	A	H	A	H	A	H	H	A	H	A	H	A	H	H	A	H	A	H	A	H	A	H	A	A	H	A	H	A	H	A	A	H	A	H
Result	L	W	W	L	L	W	W	L	D	L	L	W	L	W	L	W	L	W	L	D	L	D	L	L	L	W	D	D	L	L	W	L	D	L
Position	14	9	6	7	9	8	7	8	8	9	10	8	9	9	10	9	9	8	9	9	9	10	10	12	13	12	12	12	12	12	12	13	13	13

Updated to match(es) played on 27 May 2024. Source: spl.com.sa
A = Away; H = Home; W = Win; D = Draw; L = Loss

==== Matches ====
All times are local, AST (UTC+3).

Win Draw Loss Postponed

13 August 2023 1	Al-Riyadh	1–0	Al-Wehda	Riyadh
21:00	Musona 17', (yellow card) 45+1'; Al-Nowaiqi (yellow card) 74'	Report	Al-Qahtani (yellow card) 60'	Stadium: Prince Faisal bin Fahd Stadium; Attendance: 1,419; Referee: Mamdouh Al Shahdan

18 August 2023 2	Al-Wehda	3–1	Al-Shabab	Mecca
21:00	Al Hejji (yellow card) 4'; Anselmo 45'; Al-Eisa 45+3'; Noor (yellow card) 63'; Al-Najei 90+7'	Report	Al-Qahtani (yellow card) 29'; El Yamiq 90+5' (o.g.)	Stadium: King Abdul Aziz Stadium; Attendance: 3,000; Referee: Shukri Al-Hanfoush

24 August 2023 3	Al-Tai	0–3	Al-Wehda	Ha'il
18:00	Al-Shamlan (yellow card) 20'	Report	Fajr 34' (pen.); Al-Muwallad 62'; Al Hejji (yellow card) 75'; Ighalo 90+2'	Stadium: Prince Abdul Aziz bin Musa'ed Stadium; Attendance: 2,217; Referee: Mohammed Al-Beredi

28 August 2023 4	Al-Wehda	0–3	Al-Ittihad	Mecca
21:00	Noor (yellow card) 45+5'; Anselmo (yellow card) 45+6'	Report	Hamdallah (yellow card) 61'; Romarinho 63'; Jota 67'; Coronado 73'	Stadium: King Abdul Aziz Stadium; Attendance: 9,500; Referee: Facundo Tello (Argentina)

2 September 2023 5	Al-Taawoun	4–1	Al-Wehda	Buraidah
21:00	Flávio 10'; Al-Rouqi 28'; Al-Ahmed (yellow card) 40', (goal) 62'; Faqeehi (yellow card) 52'; Girotto 85', (yellow card) 88'; Mailson (yellow card) 88'	Report	Fajr 90' (pen.)	Stadium: Al-Taawoun Club Stadium; Attendance: 4,197; Referee: Abdullah Al-Shehri

14 September 2023 6	Al-Wehda	4–2	Damac	Mecca
21:00	Ighalo 17', 45+1' (pen.), 52'; Goodwin 62'; Al-Hafith (yellow card) 86'	Report	Ceesay 36'; Al-Rashidi (red card) 43'; Faqihi 83', (yellow card) 90+1'; A. Hawsawi (yellow card) 85'	Stadium: King Abdul Aziz Stadium; Attendance: 820; Referee: Abdullah Al-Harbi

22 September 2023 7	Al-Wehda	4–0	Abha	Mecca
21:00	Goodwin 8'; Al-Hafith 24'; Fajr 65'; Bakshween (yellow card) 73'; Ighalo 88'	Report	Al-Qumayzi (yellow card) 44'	Stadium: King Abdul Aziz Stadium; Attendance: 661; Referee: Raed Al-Zahrani

30 September 2023 8	Al-Fateh	5–1	Al-Wehda	Al-Hasa
18:00	Saâdane (yellow card) 26'; Tello 45+5', 89', 90+2'; Batna 67'; Djaniny 86'	Report	Goodwin 21'; Anselmo (yellow card) 23'; Bakshween (yellow card) 44'	Stadium: Prince Abdullah bin Jalawi Stadium; Attendance: 2,885; Referee: Mamdouh Al Shahdan

7 October 2023 9	Al-Wehda	1–1	Al-Fayha	Mecca
21:00	Al-Hejji (yellow card) 59'; Duarte (yellow card) 73'; El Yamiq 76'	Report	Onyekuru 23'; Ryller (yellow card) 48'; Stojković (yellow card) 90+3'; Sabiri (yellow card) 90+7'	Stadium: King Abdul Aziz Stadium; Attendance: 937; Referee: Abdullah Al-Harbi

21 October 2023 10	Al-Ahli	3–1	Al-Wehda	Jeddah
21:00	Saint-Maximin 45+3'; Hindi (yellow card) 47'; Ibañez 68'; Mahrez 84'	Report	Ighalo (yellow card) 8'; Duarte (yellow card) 35'; Hindi 51' (o.g.); Al Hejji (red card) 90+1'; Noor (yellow card) 90+6'	Stadium: Prince Abdullah Al Faisal Stadium; Attendance: 16,919; Referee: Jesús Valenzuela (Venezuela)

28 October 2023 11	Al-Wehda	2–3	Al-Ettifaq	Mecca
21:00	Goodwin 37', 51'; Al-Eisa (yellow card) 54' van Crooij (yellow card) 90+1'; Bukhari (yellow card) 90+4'	Report	Wijnaldum 18', 81'; Henderson (yellow card) 58'; Gray 90+8'; Hendry (yellow card) 90+10'	Stadium: King Abdul Aziz Stadium; Attendance: 1,188; Referee: Khaled Al-Teris

5 November 2023 12	Al-Hazem	1–2	Al-Wehda	Ar Rass
18:00	Viana 23', (yellow card) 45+2' (yellow-red card) 90'; Al Mohaimed (yellow card) 49'	Report	Al-Hafith (yellow card) 22'; Noor 70', 85'; Bakshween (yellow card) 81'	Stadium: Al-Hazem Club Stadium; Attendance: 427; Referee: Mohammed Al-Harbi

11 November 2023 13	Al-Wehda	1–3	Al-Nassr	Mecca
21:00	Bakshween (yellow card) 60'; Anselmo 81'	Report	Telles 11'; Al-Amri 39'; Ronaldo 49'	Stadium: King Abdul Aziz Stadium; Attendance: 10,727; Referee: Fernando Guerrero (Mexico)

25 November 2023 14	Al-Wehda	3–1	Al-Khaleej	Mecca
21:00	Ighalo 3', 58', 80' (pen.)	Report	Martins 22' (pen.), (yellow card) 71'; Jung Woo-young (yellow card) 48'; Hawsawi (yellow card) 74'	Stadium: King Abdul Aziz Stadium; Attendance: 447; Referee: Mohammed Al-Beredi

2 December 2023 15	Al-Raed	2–0	Al-Wehda	Buraidah
21:00	Fouzair 44' (pen.), (yellow card) 45+8'; Sayoud 68'; Al-Subaie (yellow card) 85'	Report	I. Hawsawi (red card) 27'; Anselmo (yellow card) 45'; Ighalo (yellow card) 90+2'	Stadium: King Abdullah Sport City Stadium; Attendance: 1,520; Referee: Abdulrahman Al-Sultan

9 December 2023 16	Al-Wehda	2–0	Al-Okhdood	Mecca
21:00	Noor 16'; Al-Akouz (yellow card) 69'; Duarte 84'	2023–24 Al-Okhdood Club season#Pre-season	Burcă (yellow card) 29'; Vítor (red card) 90+4'	Stadium: King Abdul Aziz Stadium; Attendance: 575; Referee: Khaled Al-Teris

15 December 2023 17	Al-Hilal	2–0	Al-Wehda	Riyadh
18:00	Abdulhamid 20'; Mitrović 80'	Report		Stadium: Prince Faisal bin Fahd Stadium; Attendance: 13,349; Referee: Ismail Elfath (United States)

24 December 2023 18	Al-Wehda	3–1	Al-Riyadh	Mecca
21:00	El Yamiq 36'; Al Hejji (yellow card) 73'; Goodwin 82'; Ighalo 90+4' (pen.)	Report	Assiri (yellow card) 28'; Al-Shuwayyi (yellow card) 45+3'; Al Abbas 86'	Stadium: King Abdul Aziz Stadium; Attendance: 668; Referee: Abdullah Al-Kharboush

30 December 2023 19	Al-Shabab	1–0	Al-Wehda	Riyadh
21:00	Al-Harbi (yellow card) 34'; Carrasco (yellow card) 73'; Radif 85'	Report	Al-Qarni (yellow card) 90+3'	Stadium: Al-Shabab Club Stadium; Attendance: 3,451; Referee: Danny Makkelie (Netherlands)

16 February 2024 20	Al-Wehda	1–1	Al-Tai	Mecca
20:00	Al-Hejji (yellow card) 1'; El Yamiq 72'; Bakshween (yellow card) 77'	Report	Al-Johani (yellow card) 42'; Cordea 90+8'	Stadium: King Abdul Aziz Stadium; Attendance: 848; Referee: Khaled Al-Teris

26 February 2024 21	Al-Ittihad	2–1	Al-Wehda	Jeddah
20:00	Hamdallah 84' (pen.), 90+4', (yellow card) 90+6'; Al Mousa (red card) 90'	Report	Ighalo 35'; Bukhari (yellow card) 37'; Makki (yellow card) 45+10'; Noor (yellow card) 58'; El Yamiq (yellow card) 82'	Stadium: King Abdullah Sports City; Attendance: 38,221; Referee: Kevin Ortega (Peru)

29 February 2024 22	Al-Wehda	3–3	Al-Taawoun	Mecca
17:00	Ighalo 20', 74' (pen.); Fajr 35'; Makki (yellow card) 56'	Report	Barrow 28'; Castro 45', 86'; Al-Oyayari (yellow card) 48'	Stadium: King Abdul Aziz Stadium; Attendance: 782; Referee: Fareeh Al-Jaloud

7 March 2024 23	Damac	1–0	Al-Wehda	Khamis Mushait
17:00	Bukhari 22' (o.g.); Al-Anazi (yellow card) 90+6'	Report	El Yamiq (yellow card) 28', (red card) 72'; Anselmo (yellow card) 51'	Stadium: Damac Club Stadium; Attendance: 2,783; Referee: Mohammed Al-Beredi

14 March 2024 24	Abha	1–0	Al-Wehda	Abha
22:00	Al-Sahafi 34'	Report	Bakshween (red card) 22'; I. Hawsawi (yellow card) 55'; Goodwin (yellow card) 61' van Crooij (yellow card) 90+2'; Al-Bishi (yellow card) 90+6'	Stadium: Prince Sultan bin Abdul Aziz Stadium; Attendance: 873; Referee: Abdullah Al-Kharboush

30 March 2024 25	Al-Wehda	2–3	Al-Fateh	Mecca
22:00	Al-Muwallad (yellow card) 37'; Anselmo 42', 51'; Fajr (yellow card) 89'; Bukhari (yellow card) 90'	Report	Tello 29', 68'; Al-Shurafa 73', (yellow card) 90+6'; Al-Mousa (red card) 90+12'	Stadium: King Abdul Aziz Stadium; Attendance: 365; Referee: Abdullah Al-Shehri

2 April 2024 26	Al-Fayha	1–2	Al-Wehda	Al Majma'ah
22:00	Sakala 53'; Kaabi (yellow card) 58'; Cimirot (yellow card) 81'; Al-Rashidi (yellow card) 83'; Zidan (yellow card) 90+10'	Report	Noor (yellow card) 31'; Duarte 47'; Anselmo 56', (yellow card) 90'	Stadium: Al Majma'ah Sports City; Attendance: 379; Referee: Mohammed Al-Beredi

5 April 2024 27	Al-Wehda	1–1	Al-Ahli	Jeddah
22:00	Ighalo (yellow card) 37'; Bakshween (yellow card) 46'; Noor 48'; El Yamiq (yellow card) 82'; Goodwin (yellow card) 90'	Report	Al-Nabit (yellow card) 66'; Hindi (red card) 79'; Ibañez 83'; Mendy (yellow card) 90'	Stadium: Prince Abdullah Al Faisal Stadium; Attendance: 7,647; Referee: Mohammed Al-Hoaish

20 April 2024 28	Al-Ettifaq	0–0	Al-Wehda	Dammam
21:00		Report		Stadium: Al-Ettifaq Club Stadium; Attendance: 3,070; Referee: Abdulsamad Bakri

25 April 2024 29	Al-Wehda	0–2	Al-Hazem	Mecca
21:00	Al-Hafith (yellow card) 56'	Report	Al-Juwaid (red card) 37'; Selemani 64'; Badamosi 68'; Ricardo (yellow card) 90+8'	Stadium: King Abdul Aziz Stadium; Attendance: 695; Referee: Abdullah Al-Harbi

4 May 2024 30	Al-Nassr	6–0	Al-Wehda	Riyadh
21:00	Ronaldo 5', 12', 52'; Otávio 18'; Mané 45'; Al Fatil 88'	Report	Anselmo (yellow card) 38'; Fajr (yellow card) 87'	Stadium: Al-Awwal Park; Attendance: 10,037; Referee: Sultan Al-Harbi

10 May 2024 31	Al-Khaleej	1–2	Al-Wehda	Dammam
21:00	Hawsawi (yellow card) 11'; Masoud (yellow card) 45' (yellow-red card) 81'; Sherif 66'	Report	van Crooij (yellow card) 4'; Ighalo 27', 82' (pen.); El Yamiq (yellow card) 62'; Noor (yellow card) 87'	Stadium: Prince Mohamed bin Fahd Stadium; Attendance: 1,657; Referee: Mamdouh Al Shahdan

16 May 2024 32	Al-Wehda	0–1	Al-Raed	Mecca
21:00	Anselmo (yellow card) 45+4'	Report	El Berkaoui 86', (yellow card) 87'; Normann (yellow card) 89'	Stadium: King Abdul Aziz Stadium; Attendance: 753; Referee: Shukri Al-Hanfoush

23 May 2024 33	Al-Okhdood	1–1	Al-Wehda	Najran
21:00	Collado 30'; Al-Rubaie (yellow card) 45'; Al Mansour (yellow card) 68'; Khamis (yellow card) 89'; Pedroza (yellow card) 90'; Asiri (yellow card) 90+13'	Report	Ighalo 12', (yellow card) 90+13'; Al-Hafith (yellow card) 60'; Anselmo (yellow card) 70'; Noor (yellow card) 73'; Al Hejji (yellow card) 83'	Stadium: Prince Hathloul bin Abdul Aziz Sports City; Attendance: 1,315; Referee: Mohammed Al-Hoaish

27 May 2024 34	Al-Wehda	1–2	Al-Hilal	Mecca
21:00	Noor (yellow card) 69'; Al-Najei 77'; Al-Qarni (yellow card) 82'	Report	Kanno 19'; Koulibaly (yellow card) 45+1'; Mitrović 90+2'	Stadium: King Abdul Aziz Stadium; Attendance: 5,144; Referee: Shukri Al-Hanfoush

=== King Cup ===
All times are local, AST (UTC+3).

27 September 2023 Round of 32	Al-Orobah	0–2	Al-Wehda	Sakakah
18:00	Al-Dossari (yellow card) 36'; Darwish (yellow card) 50'; R. Al-Ruwaili (yellow card) 90'	Report	El Yamiq (yellow card) 10'; Ighalo 76'; Al-Azizi 89'	Stadium: Al-Orobah Club Stadium; Referee: Meshal Al-Shehri

31 October 2023 Round of 16	Al-Taawoun	2–0	Al-Wehda	Buraidah
15:15	Munir 1' (o.g.); Medrán 11', (yellow card) 73'; El Mahdioui (yellow card) 81'	Report	Bakshween (yellow card) 20'; Al Hejji (yellow card) 27'; Fajr (yellow card) 81'	Stadium: Al-Taawoun Club Stadium; Attendance: 3,416; Referee: Mohammed Al-Hoaish

=== Super Cup ===
8 April 2024 Semi-finals	Al-Ittihad	2–1	Al-Wehda	Abu Dhabi, United Arab Emirates
21:00 UTC+4	Benzema 1'; Hamdallah 42'; Jota (yellow card) 50'	Report	Al-Ghamdi (yellow card) 66'; Al-Eisa 90+7'	Stadium: Al Nahyan Stadium; Attendance: 9,000; Referee: Faisal Al-Blwi

== Statistics ==
=== Appearances ===
Last updated on 27 May 2024.

No.	Pos	Nat	Player	Total		Pro League		King Cup		Super Cup	
No.	Pos	Nat	Player	Apps	Goals	Apps	Goals	Apps	Goals	Apps	Goals
Goalkeepers
1	GK	(Morocco) MAR	Munir Mohamedi	30	0	27	0	2	0	1	0
13	GK	(Saudi Arabia) KSA	Abdulquddus Atiah	7	0	7	0	0	0	0	0
21	GK	(Saudi Arabia) KSA	Ayman Al-Hussaini	0	0	0	0	0	0	0	0
Defenders
2	DF	(Saudi Arabia) KSA	Saeed Al-Muwallad	29	1	24+2	1	2	0	1	0
3	DF	(Saudi Arabia) KSA	Abdulelah Bukhari	22	0	5+15	0	2	0	0	0
5	DF	(Morocco) MAR	Jawad El Yamiq	25	3	22+1	3	1	0	1	0
6	DF	(Costa Rica) CRC	Óscar Duarte	20	2	17+2	2	1	0	0	0
17	DF	(Saudi Arabia) KSA	Abdullah Al-Hafith	27	1	20+4	1	2	0	1	0
18	DF	(Saudi Arabia) KSA	Abdulrahman Al-Hajeri	0	0	0	0	0	0	0	0
22	DF	(Saudi Arabia) KSA	Ali Makki	16	0	12+3	0	0	0	0+1	0
27	DF	(Saudi Arabia) KSA	Islam Hawsawi	34	0	29+3	0	0+1	0	1	0
38	DF	(Saudi Arabia) KSA	Naif Kariri	4	0	0+3	0	0+1	0	0	0
Midfielders
4	MF	(Saudi Arabia) KSA	Waleed Bakshween	33	0	24+6	0	2	0	1	0
8	MF	(Saudi Arabia) KSA	Mohammed Al-Qarni	3	0	0+3	0	0	0	0	0
11	MF	(Saudi Arabia) KSA	Sultan Al-Akouz	7	0	0+7	0	0	0	0	0
12	MF	(Saudi Arabia) KSA	Abdulkareem Al-Qahtani	4	0	1+3	0	0	0	0	0
16	MF	(Saudi Arabia) KSA	Nawaf Al-Azizi	6	1	1+4	0	0+1	1	0	0
24	MF	(Sudan) SDN	Abdulaziz Noor	35	4	23+9	4	1+1	0	1	0
28	MF	(Saudi Arabia) KSA	Hussain Al-Eisa	20	2	13+4	1	0+2	0	0+1	1
35	MF	(Saudi Arabia) KSA	Yousef Al-Harbi	3	0	0+2	0	0+1	0	0	0
76	MF	(Morocco) MAR	Fayçal Fajr	36	4	33	4	2	0	1	0
80	MF	(Saudi Arabia) KSA	Yahya Al-Najei	18	2	2+15	2	0+1	0	0	0
87	MF	(Brazil) BRA	Anselmo	34	5	30+1	5	2	0	1	0
88	MF	(Saudi Arabia) KSA	Alaa Al Hejji	33	0	15+15	0	1+1	0	0+1	0
90	MF	(Saudi Arabia) KSA	Hazzaa Al-Ghamdi	23	0	7+15	0	0	0	0+1	0
Forwards
7	FW	(Netherlands) NED	Vito van Crooij	25	0	13+10	0	1	0	1	0
9	FW	(Nigeria) NGR	Odion Ighalo	34	16	29+2	15	2	1	1	0
15	FW	(Saudi Arabia) KSA	Azzam Al-Bishi	2	0	0+2	0	0	0	0	0
20	FW	(Saudi Arabia) KSA	Jaber Asiri	6	0	1+5	0	0	0	0	0
23	FW	(Australia) AUS	Craig Goodwin	24	6	19+3	6	1+1	0	0	0
Players sent out on loan this season
25	MF	(Saudi Arabia) KSA	Sattam Al-Tambakti	1	0	0+1	0	0	0	0	0
55	MF	(Saudi Arabia) KSA	Nawaf Hawsawi	0	0	0	0	0	0	0	0

=== Goalscorers ===
Rank	No.	Pos	Nat	Name	Pro League	King Cup	Super Cup	Total
1	9	FW	(Nigeria)	Odion Ighalo	15	1	0	16
2	23	FW	(Australia)	Craig Goodwin	6	0	0	6
3	87	MF	(Brazil)	Anselmo	5	0	0	5
4	24	MF	(Sudan)	Abdulaziz Noor	4	0	0	4
4	76	MF	(Morocco)	Fayçal Fajr	4	0	0	4
6	5	DF	(Morocco)	Jawad El Yamiq	3	0	0	3
7	6	DF	(Costa Rica)	Óscar Duarte	2	0	0	2
7	28	MF	(Saudi Arabia)	Hussain Al-Eisa	1	0	1	2
7	80	MF	(Saudi Arabia)	Yahya Al-Najei	2	0	0	2
10	2	DF	(Saudi Arabia)	Saeed Al-Muwallad	1	0	0	1
10	16	MF	(Saudi Arabia)	Nawaf Al-Azizi	0	1	0	1
10	17	DF	(Saudi Arabia)	Abdullah Al-Hafith	1	0	0	1
Own goal					1	0	0	1
Total					45	2	1	48

Last Updated: 27 May 2024

=== Assists ===
Rank	No.	Pos	Nat	Name	Pro League	King Cup	Super Cup	Total
1	76	MF	(Morocco)	Fayçal Fajr	8	0	0	8
2	24	MF	(Sudan)	Abdulaziz Noor	5	0	0	5
3	4	MF	(Saudi Arabia)	Waleed Bakshween	3	0	0	3
3	23	FW	(Australia)	Craig Goodwin	3	0	0	3
5	87	MF	(Brazil)	Anselmo	1	1	0	2
6	2	DF	(Saudi Arabia)	Saeed Al-Muwallad	1	0	0	1
6	6	DF	(Costa Rica)	Óscar Duarte	1	0	0	1
6	8	MF	(Saudi Arabia)	Mohammed Al-Qarni	1	0	0	1
6	9	FW	(Nigeria)	Odion Ighalo	0	0	1	1
6	22	DF	(Saudi Arabia)	Ali Makki	1	0	0	1
6	27	DF	(Saudi Arabia)	Islam Hawsawi	1	0	0	1
6	28	MF	(Saudi Arabia)	Hussain Al-Eisa	1	0	0	1
6	88	MF	(Saudi Arabia)	Alaa Al Hejji	1	0	0	1
Total					27	1	1	29

Last Updated: 27 May 2024

=== Clean sheets ===
Rank	No.	Pos	Nat	Name	Pro League	King Cup	Super Cup	Total
1	1	GK	(Morocco)	Munir Mohamedi	3	1	0	4
2	13	GK	(Saudi Arabia)	Abdulquddus Atiah	1	0	0	1
Total					4	1	0	5

Last Updated: 20 April 2024
