= 2022–23 King's Cup (Saudi Arabia) =

2022–23 King Cup
Custodian of the Two Holy Mosques Cup
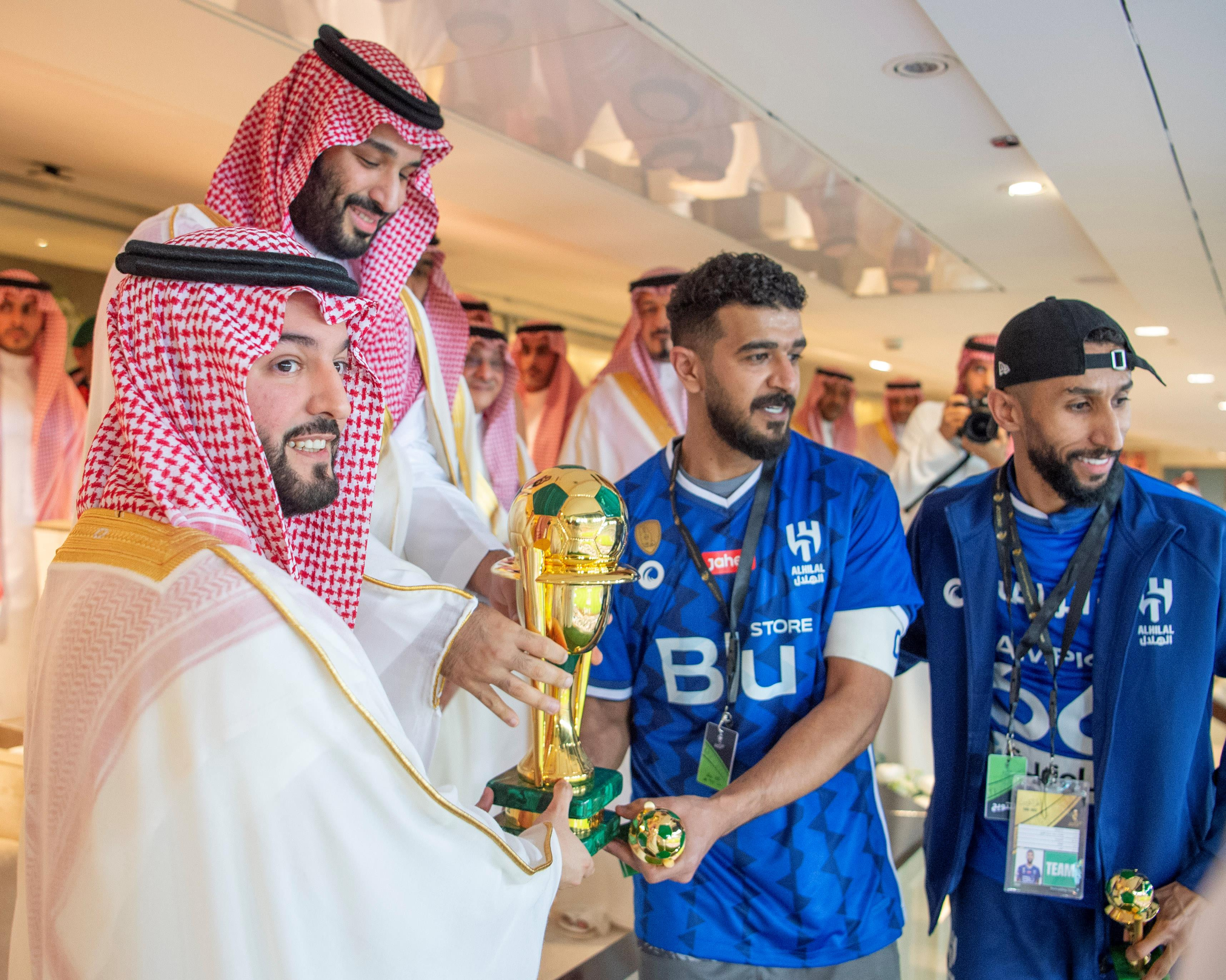

Tournament details
- Country: Saudi Arabia
- Dates: 20 December 2022 – 12 May 2023
- Teams: 16

Final positions
- Champions: Al-Hilal (10th title)
- Runners-up: Al-Wehda

Tournament statistics
- Matches played: 15
- Goals scored: 42 (2.8 per match)
- Top goal scorer(s): Abdulfattah Adam (3 goals)
- All statistics correct as of 12 May 2023.

The 2022–23 King Cup, or The Custodian of the Two Holy Mosques Cup, was the 48th edition of the King Cup since its establishment in 1957. The tournament began on 20 December 2022 and concluded with the final on 12 May 2023.

For the third year in a row, the tournament was limited to the 16 teams participating in the 2022–23 Saudi Professional League. This will be the first edition of the King Cup in which Al-Ahli, the most successful team in the competition, will not participate.

Al-Fayha are the defending champions after winning their first title last season. They were eliminated in the quarter-finals by Al-Ittihad.

Al-Hilal defeated Al-Wehda on penalties in the final following a 1–1 draw after extra time to win their 10th title.

== Participating teams ==
A total of 16 teams participated in this season, all of which competed in the Pro League.

League	Teams
Pro League	Abha; Al-Adalah; Al-Batin; Al-Ettifaq; Al-Fateh; Al-Fayha ^{TH}; Al-Hilal; Al-Ittihad; Al-Khaleej; Al-Nassr; Al-Raed; Al-Shabab; Al-Taawoun; Al-Tai; Al-Wehda; Damac

== Bracket ==
Round of 16
A	Al-Shabab	1 (3)
H	Al-Ittihad (p)	1 (4)
H	Al-Fayha	3
A	Al-Khaleej	1
H	Al-Fateh (p)	2 (7)
A	Al-Tai	2 (6)
H	Al-Hilal	4
A	Al-Ettifaq	0
A	Al-Raed	0
H	Al-Batin	1
H	Damac	0
A	Al-Wehda	1
A	Al-Taawoun	3
H	Abha (a.e.t.)	4
H	Al-Nassr	2
A	Al-Adalah	0

Quarter-finals
A	Al-Ittihad (p)	1 (4)
H	Al-Fayha	1 (3)
A	Al-Fateh	1
H	Al-Hilal	3
A	Al-Batin	1
H	Al-Wehda	2
A	Abha	1
H	Al-Nassr	3

Semi-finals
H	Al-Ittihad	0
A	Al-Hilal (a.e.t.)	1
A	Al-Wehda	1
H	Al-Nassr	0

Final
-	Al-Hilal (p)	1 (7)
-	Al-Wehda	1 (6)

Note: H: Home team, A: Away team

Source: SAFF

== Round of 16 ==
The draw for the whole tournament was held on 1 November 2022. The dates for the Round of 16 fixtures were announced on 10 November 2022. All times are local, AST (UTC+3).

20 December 2022 6	Damac (1)	0–1	Al-Wehda (1)	Abha
15:30	Al-Shamrani (red card) 62'; Maher (yellow card) 68'	Report	Fajr (yellow card) 80'; Anselmo 82'	Stadium: Prince Sultan bin Abdul Aziz Stadium; Referee: Mohammed Al-Beredi

20 December 2022 2	Al-Fayha (1)	3–1	Al-Khaleej (1)	Al Majma'ah
18:00	Al-Zaqaan 29'; Paulinho (yellow card) 44'; Abousaban 45+1', (yellow card) 45+4'; Al Freej (yellow card) 82' Mandash 90+5'	Report	Cikalleshi 19'; Al-Zahrani (yellow card) 63'; Morato (yellow card) 84'	Stadium: Al Majma'ah Sports City; Referee: Abdullah Al-Kharboush

21 December 2022 7	Abha (1)	4–3 (a.e.t.)	Al-Taawoun (1)	Abha
15:30	Sharahili (yellow card) 11'; Caicedo 16'; Al-Amri (yellow card) 51'; Bguir 90+5' (pen.); Adam 97', 105+2'; Al-Kunaydiri (yellow card) 106' (yellow-red card) 118'	Report	Naldo (yellow card) 18'; Kaku 30', 84' (pen.); Al-Ghamdi (yellow card) 68'; Al-Rashidi (yellow card) 90+1'; Abdullah (yellow card) 104' Tawamba 107'	Stadium: Prince Sultan bin Abdul Aziz Stadium; Referee: Mohammed Al-Harbi

21 December 2022 4	Al-Hilal (1)	4–0	Al-Ettifaq (1)	Riyadh
18:00	Ighalo 12'; Al-Breik 42'; Vietto 45+5'; Michael 90+3'	Report	F. Al-Ghamdi (yellow card) 27'; Sliti (red card) 40'	Stadium: Prince Faisal bin Fahd Stadium; Attendance: 4,372; Referee: István Kovács (Romania)

21 December 2022 8	Al-Nassr (1)	2–0	Al-Adalah (1)	Riyadh
21:00	Álvaro (yellow card) 40'; Yahya 41'; Al-Najei 85'; Talisca (yellow card) 90+8'	Report	Abo Abd (yellow card) 90+8'	Stadium: Prince Abdulrahman bin Saud Stadium; Referee: Mohammed Al-Esmaiel

22 December 2022 5	Al-Batin (1)	1–0	Al-Raed (1)	Hafar al-Batin
15:30	Anwar (yellow card) 18'; Al-Shammari (yellow card) 24', (goal) 76'	Report	Al-Rajeh (yellow card) 74'	Stadium: Al-Batin Club Stadium; Referee: Abdullah Al-Shehri

22 December 2022 3	Al-Fateh (1)	2–2 (a.e.t.) (7–6 p)	Al-Tai (1)	Al-Hasa
18:00	Batna 12'; Boushal (yellow card) 67'; Buhimed (yellow card) 90+10'; Al Salis 112'	Report	Martínez (yellow card) 9'; Dener (yellow card) 61'; Musona 65'; Qassem (yellow card) 77'; Majrashi (yellow card) 90+12'; Al-Jubairi (yellow card) 105+4'; Al Salis 119' (o.g.)	Stadium: Prince Abdullah bin Jalawi Stadium; Attendance: 608; Referee: Abdullah Al-Harbi
	Penalties
	Saâdane (penalty scored); Buhimed (penalty scored); Al-Buraikan (penalty scored); Valera (penalty scored); Al Salis (penalty scored); Vélez (penalty scored); Boushal (penalty scored)		(penalty scored) Dener; (penalty scored) Mbenza; (penalty scored) Semedo; (penalty scored) Al-Harabi; (penalty scored) Al-Jubairi; (penalty scored) Martínez; (penalty missed) Harzan

22 December 2022 1	Al-Ittihad (1)	1–1 (a.e.t.) (4–3 p)	Al-Shabab (1)	Jeddah
21:00	Hegazi (yellow card) 45+3'; Hamdallah 48', (yellow card) 120+2'; Hamed (yellow card) 53'; Grohe (yellow card) 120+1'	Report	Al-Muwallad (yellow card) 25'; Al-Harbi 40', (yellow card) 90+8'; Krychowiak (yellow card) 45+8'; Al-Tambakti (yellow card) 120+1'	Stadium: King Abdullah Sports City; Attendance: 32,144; Referee: Georgi Kabakov (Bulgaria)
	Penalties
	Hamdallah (penalty scored); Al-Saiari (penalty scored); Al-Bishi (penalty scored); Al-Nashri (penalty missed); Romarinho (penalty scored)		(penalty scored) Guanca; (penalty scored) Bahebri; (penalty scored) Santos; (penalty missed) Krychowiak; (penalty missed) Banega

== Quarter-finals ==
The dates for the Quarter-finals fixtures were announced on 5 January 2023. The Al-Wehda v Al-Batin was postponed for one day due to flight issues. All times are local, AST (UTC+3).

13 March 2023 9	Al-Fayha (1)	1–1 (a.e.t.) (3–4 p)	Al-Ittihad (1)	Al Majma'ah
17:30	Ruiz (yellow card) 15'; Ryller 45+5'; Al-Shuwaish (yellow card) 63'; Nwakaeme (yellow card) 64'; Al-Safri (yellow card) 69'; Nasser (yellow card) 83'	Report	Romarinho (yellow card) 14'; Camara 16'; Hamed (yellow card) 105'; Al-Bishi (yellow card) 117'; Al-Saiari (yellow card) 120+2'	Stadium: Al Majma'ah Sports City; Referee: Ivan Kružliak (Slovakia)
	Penalties
	Nwakaeme (penalty missed); Abousaban (penalty scored); Al-Shamekh (penalty scored); Zidan (penalty scored); Al-Baqawi (penalty missed)		(penalty scored) Hamdallah; (penalty scored) Coronado; (penalty scored) Al-Saiari; (penalty scored) Bamsaud

14 March 2023 11	Al-Wehda (1)	2–1	Al-Batin (1)	Mecca
16:15	Bukhari (yellow card) 8'; Fajr 19' (pen.); Anselmo (yellow card) 43', (goal) 45+7'; Makki (yellow card) 45+2'	Report	Fawaz 39'; Nasser (yellow card) 43'; Al-Sohaymi (yellow card) 45+1'; Al-Qarni (yellow card) 82'	Stadium: King Abdul Aziz Stadium; Referee: Sultan Al-Harbi

14 March 2023 12	Al-Nassr (1)	3–1	Abha (1)	Riyadh
17:30	Al-Najei 1'; Al-Khaibari 21'; Al-Sulayhem (yellow card) 28'; Ronaldo (yellow card) 45+3'; Maran 49'	Report	Saddiki (yellow card) 25'; Adam 69'; Al-Jumayah (yellow card) 72'	Stadium: Mrsool Park; Attendance: 17,327; Referee: Andris Treimanis (Latvia)

14 March 2023 10	Al-Hilal (1)	3–1	Al-Fateh (1)	Riyadh
21:00	Kanno 17' (pen.); Al-Bulaihi (yellow card) 26' (yellow-red card) 67'; Michael 48'; Cuéllar (yellow card) 76'; Ighalo 84'	Report	Al-Najdi (yellow card) 12'; Al-Buraikan 27'; Vélez (yellow card) 35'; Saâdane (yellow card) 76'	Stadium: Prince Faisal bin Fahd Stadium; Attendance: 12,023; Referee: Radu Petrescu (Romania)

== Semi-finals ==
All times are local, AST (UTC+3).

23 April 2023 13	Al-Ittihad (1)	0–1 (a.e.t.)	Al-Hilal (1)	Jeddah
21:00	O. Hawsawi (yellow card) 88'	Report	Al-Shahrani (yellow card) 44'; Al-Breik (yellow card) 71'; Abdulhamid (yellow card) 90+12'; Cuéllar (yellow card) 104'; Hegazi 106' (o.g.)	Stadium: King Abdullah Sports City; Attendance: 53,642; Referee: Danny Makkelie (Netherlands)

24 April 2023 14	Al-Nassr (1)	0–1	Al-Wehda (1)	Riyadh
21:00		Report	Beauguel 23'; Al-Hafith (yellow card) 24' (yellow-red card) 53'; Bakshween (yellow card) 60'; Al-Jayzani (yellow card) 88'; Munir (yellow card) 90+4'	Stadium: Al-Awwal Park; Attendance: 17,482; Referee: Radu Petrescu (Romania)

== Final ==
All times are local, AST (UTC+3).

12 May 2023
21:00

Al-Hilal	1–1 (a.e.t.)	Al-Wehda
Al-Bulaihii 90+9'	Report	Yoda 35'
Penalties
Carrillo (penalty missed); Ighalo (penalty missed); Al-Shehri (penalty scored); Al-Juwayr (penalty scored); Al-Hamdan (penalty scored); N. Al-Dawsari (penalty scored); Abdulhamid (penalty scored); Jang Hyun-soo (penalty scored); Al-Mayouf (penalty scored)	7–6	(penalty missed) Beauguel; (penalty scored) Bukhari; (penalty missed) Al Hejji; (penalty scored) Duarte; (penalty scored) Fajr; (penalty scored) Al-Naji; (penalty scored) Makki; (penalty scored) Kurdi; (penalty missed) Al-Ghamdi

King Abdullah Sports City, Jeddah
Attendance: 52,320
Referee: Szymon Marciniak (Poland)

== Top goalscorers ==
Rank	Player	Club	Goals
1	(Saudi Arabia) Abdulfattah Adam	Abha	3
2	(Brazil) Anselmo	Al-Wehda	2
2	(Nigeria) Odion Ighalo	Al-Hilal	2
2	(Paraguay) Kaku	Al-Taawoun	2
2	(Saudi Arabia) Sami Al-Najei	Al-Nassr	2
2	(Brazil) Michael	Al-Hilal	2
7	(Morocco) Fayçal Fajr	Al-Wehda	1
7	(France) Jean-David Beauguel	Al-Wehda	1
7	(Saudi Arabia) Mohammed Al-Breik	Al-Hilal	1
7	(Argentina) Luciano Vietto	Al-Hilal	1
7	(Saudi Arabia) Mohamed Kanno	Al-Hilal	1
