= Hussain Al-Eisa =

Saudi association football player

Personal information
- Full name: Hussain Ahmed Al-Eisa
- Date of birth: December 29, 2000 (age 25)
- Place of birth: Al-Hasa, Saudi Arabia
- Height: 1.65 m (5 ft 5 in)
- Position: Winger

Team information
- Current team: Al-Khaleej
- Number: 20

Youth career
- –2017: Al-Adalah

Senior career*
Years	Team	Apps	(Gls)
2017–2020	Al-Adalah	47	(5)
2020–2025	Al-Wehda	65	(4)
2021–2022	→ Al-Batin (loan)	26	(0)
2026–	Al-Khaleej	0	(0)

International career^{‡}
2019–2022	Saudi Arabia U23		
2023–	Saudi Arabia	1	(0)
- * Club domestic league appearances and goals as of 18 August 2023 ‡ National team caps and goals as of 9 January 2023

Hussain Ahmed Al-Eisa (Arabic: حسين أحمد العيسى; born 29 December 2000) is a Saudi professional footballer who plays as a winger for Al-Khaleej.

== Career ==
=== Al-Adalah ===
Al-Eisa started his career with Al-Adalah where he was promoted from the youth team to the first team. He signed his first professional contract with the club on 24 June 2018. Al-Eisa helped Al-Adalah reach the Pro League, the top tier of Saudi football, for the first time in the club's history. On 11 June 2019, Al-Eisa renewed his contract with Al-Adalah following their promotion to the Pro League.

On 27 September 2020, Al-Eisa left Al-Adalah and joined Al-Wehda.

Following Al-Wehda's relegation to the MS League, Al-Eisa joined Al-Batin on loan until the end of the 2021–22 season.

On 24 January 2026, Al-Eisa joined Al-Khaleej.

== Career statistics ==
=== Club ===
As of match played 27 May 2024

Club	Season	League			Kings Cup		Continental		Other		Total	
Club	Season	Division	Apps	Goals	Apps	Goals	Apps	Goals	Apps	Goals	Apps	Goals
Al-Adalah	2017–18	Second Division	13	3	–	–	–	–	1 (Note: Appearance in 2018 King Cup qualifiers)	0	14	3
Al-Adalah	2018–19	MS League	14	0	1	0	–	–	–	–	15	0
Al-Adalah	2019–20	Pro League	20	2	1	1	–	–	–	–	21	3
Al-Adalah	Total		47	5	2	1	0	0	1	0	50	6
Al-Wehda	2020–21	Pro League	26	2	1	0	1	0	–	–	28	2
Al-Wehda	2022–23	Pro League	9	1	1	0	–	–	–	–	10	1
Al-Wehda	2023–24	Pro League	17	1	2	0	–	–	1 (Note: Appearance(s) in Saudi Super Cup)	1	20	2
Al-Wehda	Total		52	4	4	0	1	0	1	1	58	5
Al-Batin (loan)	2021–22	Pro League	26	0	2	0	0	0	–	–	28	0
Career totals			125	9	8	1	1	0	2	1	136	11

== Honours ==
=== International ===
Saudi Arabia U23

- AFC U-23 Asian Cup: 2022
