= Abdulquddus Atiah =

Saudi Arabian footballer

Abdulquddus Attiah عبد القدوس عطية
Personal information
- Full name: Abdulquddus Attiah Mohammed Qawod
- Date of birth: 1 March 1997 (age 29)
- Place of birth: Saudi Arabia
- Height: 1.90 m (6 ft 3 in)
- Position: Goalkeeper

Team information
- Current team: Al-Ula

Senior career*
| Years | Team | Apps | (Gls) |
| 2018 | Al-Fayha | 0 | (0) |
| 2018–2024 | Al-Wehda | 47 | (0) |
| 2020–2021 | → Al-Adalah (loan) | 31 | (0) |
| 2024–2026 | Al-Taawoun | 19 | (0) |
| 2026– | Al-Ula | 5 | (0) |

International career^{‡}
| 2017– | Saudi Arabia | 3 | (0) |
- * Club domestic league appearances and goals as of 11 September 2026 ‡ National team caps and goals as of 17 November 2026

Abdulquddus Attiah Mohammed Qawod (born 1 March 1997) is a Saudi professional footballer who plays as a goalkeeper for Al-Ula and the Saudi Arabia national team.

== Club career ==
On 26 January 2018, Attiah signed a 6-month contract with Al-Fayha. On 1 February 2020, Attiah signed a four-year contract with Al-Wehda. He made his debut for Al-Wehda on 2 January 2020, coming off the bench against Al-Raed during the King Cup round of 16. He made two saves during the shootout helping Al-Wehda reach the quarter-finals. On 29 February 2020, Attiah made his league debut in a 3–2 defeat to Al-Fateh. On 18 October 2020, Attiah joined Al-Adalah on a one-year loan.

During the 2021–22 season, Attiah made 31 appearances, helping Al-Wehda return to the Pro League. On 20 December 2022, Attiah made his first appearance of the 2022–23 season, keeping a clean sheet in the 1–0 away win against Damac in the round of 16 of the King Cup. On 31 July 2024, Attiah joined Al-Taawoun on a free transfer.

== International career ==
Attiah represented the Saudi national team at the 23rd Arabian Gulf Cup.

== Career statistics ==
=== Club ===
As of 27 May 2024

| Club | Season | League | | | King Cup | | Asia | | Other | | Total | |
| Club | Season | Division | Apps | Goals | Apps | Goals | Apps | Goals | Apps | Goals | Apps | Goals |
|---|---|---|---|---|---|---|---|---|---|---|---|---|
| Al-Fayha | 2017–18 | Pro League | 0 | 0 | 0 | 0 | — | | 0 | 0 | 0 | 0 |
| Al-Wehda | 2018–19 | Pro League | 0 | 0 | 0 | 0 | — | | — | | 0 | 0 |
| Al-Wehda | 2019–20 | Pro League | 1 | 0 | 1 | 0 | — | | — | | 2 | 0 |
| Al-Wehda | 2021–22 | First Division League | 31 | 0 | — | | — | | — | | 31 | 0 |
| Al-Wehda | 2022–23 | Pro League | 8 | 0 | 1 | 0 | — | | — | | 9 | 0 |
| Al-Wehda | 2023–24 | Pro League | 7 | 0 | 0 | 0 | — | | 0 | 0 | 7 | 0 |
| Al-Wehda | Club Total | | 47 | 0 | 2 | 0 | 0 | 0 | 0 | 0 | 49 | 0 |
| Al-Adalah (loan) | 2020–21 | First Division League | 31 | 0 | — | | — | | — | | 31 | 0 |
| Career Total | | | 78 | 0 | 2 | 0 | 0 | 0 | 0 | 0 | 80 | 0 |
