= Yahya Al-Najei =

Saudi Arabian footballer

Personal information
- Full name: Yahya Mahdi Al-Najei
- Date of birth: 2 March 1999 (age 27)
- Place of birth: Khobar, Saudi Arabia
- Height: 1.74 m (5 ft 9 in)
- Position: Winger

Team information
- Current team: Damac
- Number: 80

Youth career
- –2014: Al-Thoqbah
- 2014–2021: Al-Nassr

Senior career*
Years	Team	Apps	(Gls)
2021–2025	Al-Wehda	73	(8)
2025–	Damac	0	(0)

International career
2017–2019	Saudi Arabia U20		
- * Club domestic league appearances and goals as of 26 May 2025

Yahya Al-Najei (Arabic: يحيى النجعي; born 2 March 1999), is a Saudi Arabian professional footballer who plays as a winger for Saudi Pro League side Damac.

== Career ==
Al-Najei began his career at the youth team of Al-Thoqbah. In June 2014, Al-Najei joined Al-Nassr's youth team. On 19 September 2019, Al-Najei was chosen in the Future Falcons program to develop football talents established by General Sports Authority in Saudi Arabia. As part of the scholarship program, Al-Najei was sent on a one-month trial with American side Los Angeles FC on 23 May 2021. On 4 August 2021, Al-Najei joined First Division side Al-Wehda on a four-year contract. He made 15 appearances and scored 5 goals during the 2021–22 season helping Al-Wehda achieve promotion to the Pro League. On 27 August 2022, Al-Najei made his Pro League debut by starting in the 1–0 defeat to former club Al-Nassr. On 18 August 2023, Al-Najei scored his first Pro League goal in the 3–1 win against Al-Shabab.

On 27 August 2025, Al-Najei joined Damac.

== Career statistics ==
=== Club ===
As of match played 27 May 2024

Appearances and goals by club, season and competition
Club	Season	League			King Cup		Asia		Other		Total	
Club	Season	Division	Apps	Goals	Apps	Goals	Apps	Goals	Apps	Goals	Apps	Goals
Al-Wehda	2021–22	First Division	15	5	—		—		—		15	5
Al-Wehda	2022–23	Pro League	18	0	2	0	—		—		20	0
Al-Wehda	2023–24	Pro League	17	2	1	0	—		0	0	18	2
Al-Wehda	2024–25	Pro League	23	1	1	0	—		—		24	1
Al-Wehda	Total		73	8	4	0	0	0	0	0	77	8
Damac	2025–26	Pro League	0	0	0	0	—		—		0	0
Career total			73	8	4	0	0	0	0	0	77	8
