= Nawaf Al-Azizi =

Saudi Arabian footballer

Nawaf Al-Azizi نواف العزيزي
Personal information
- Full name: Nawaf Bin Saleh Al-Azizi
- Date of birth: 10 August 1999 (age 27)
- Place of birth: Adham, Saudi Arabia
- Position: Midfielder

Team information
- Current team: Al-Wehda
- Number: 16

Youth career
- 2017–2018: Al-Qadsiah

Senior career*
Years	Team	Apps	(Gls)
2018–2022	Al-Qadsiah	10	(0)
2020	→ Al-Taqadom (loan)	12	(3)
2021–2022	→ Al-Jabalain (loan)	9	(0)
2022–2023	Al-Jabalain	20	(0)
2023–	Al-Wehda	0	(0)
- * Club domestic league appearances and goals

Nawaf Al-Azizi (Arabic: نواف العزيزي; born 10 August 1999) is a Saudi Arabian professional footballer who plays as a midfielder for Al-Wehda.

== Career ==
Al-Azizi joined Al-Qadsiah's youth team on 2 August 2017. On 31 January 2019, he signed his first professional contract with Al-Qadsiah. On 1 February 2020, he joined Al-Taqadom on loan until the end of the season from Al-Qadsiah. On 12 August 2021, Al-Azizi joined Al-Jabalain on loan. On 24 July 2022, Al-Azizi joined Al-Jabalain on a permanent deal. On 18 July 2023, Al-Azizi joined Al-Wehda.
