= Islam Hawsawi =

Saudi Arabian footballer

Personal information
- Full name: Islam bin Ahmed bin Shuaib Hawsawi
- Date of birth: 27 December 2001 (age 24)
- Place of birth: Mecca, Saudi Arabia
- Height: 1.74 m (5 ft 9 in)
- Position: Left back

Team information
- Current team: Neom
- Number: 27

Youth career
- Al-Wehda

Senior career*
Years	Team	Apps	(Gls)
2021–2024	Al-Wehda	54	(1)
2024–	Neom	64	(0)

International career
2023–2024	Saudi Arabia U23		
- * Club domestic league appearances and goals as of 5 November 2026

Islam Hawsawi (Arabic: إسلام هوساوي; born 27 December 2001) is a Saudi Arabian professional footballer who plays as a left back for Saudi Pro League club Neom.

== Career ==
Hawsawi made his senior debut for Al-Wehda at the 2021 AFC Champions League, coming on as a substitute against Iraqi club Al-Quwa Al-Jawiya.

On 18 July 2024, Hawsawi joined Neom.

== Career statistics ==
=== Club ===
As of 27 May 2024

Club	Season	League			National Cup (Note: Includes the Kings Cup)		Continental		Other		Total	
Club	Season	Division	Apps	Goals	Apps	Goals	Apps	Goals	Apps	Goals	Apps	Goals
Al-Wehda	2020–21	SPL	0	0	0	0	1 (Note: Appearance(s) in the AFC Champions League)	0	—		1	0
Al-Wehda	2021–22	FDL	26	0	—		—		—		26	0
Al-Wehda	2022–23	SPL	22	1	2	0	—		—		24	1
Al-Wehda	2023–24	SPL	32	0	1	0	—		1 (Note: Appearance(s) in the Saudi Super Cup)	0	34	0
Al-Wehda	Totals		80	1	3	0	1	0	1	0	85	1
Career totals			80	1	3	0	1	0	1	0	85	1
