= Abdullah Al-Mayouf =

Saudi Arabian footballer (born 1987)

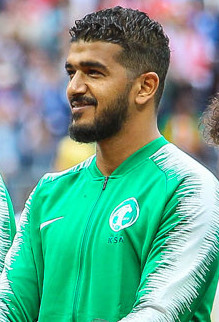
- Abdullah with Saudi Arabia at the 2018 FIFA World Cup

Personal information
- Full name: Abdullah Ibrahim Al-Mayouf
- Date of birth: 23 January 1987 (age 39)
- Place of birth: Riyadh, Saudi Arabia
- Height: 1.87 m (6 ft 2 in)
- Position: Goalkeeper

Youth career
- 2002–2005: Al-Hilal

Senior career*
Years	Team	Apps	(Gls)
2004–2007	Al-Hilal	2	(0)
2007–2016	Al-Ahli	78	(0)
2016–2023	Al Hilal	149	(1)
2023–2024	Al-Ittihad	12	(0)
2024–2025	Al-Shabab	15	(0)

International career^{‡}
2010–2019	Saudi Arabia	14	(0)
- * Club domestic league appearances and goals as of 20:27, 21 April 2025 (UTC) ‡ National team caps and goals as of 22:05, 10 August 2022 (UTC)

Abdullah Ibrahim Al-Mayouf (Arabic: عَبْد الله إِبْرَاهِيم الْمَعْيُوف; born 23 January 1987) is a Saudi Arabian professional footballer who plays as a goalkeeper.

== Club career ==
Abdullah Al-Mayouf started his career at Al-Hilal. He made his first-team debut on 22 September 2004 in the league match against Al-Ansar. He came off the bench in the 73rd minute to replace Sami Al-Jaber after goalkeeper Ali Jabaly was sent off. His next appearance came against Tunisian club Club Africain in the 2004–05 Arab Champions League on 1 March 2005. On 9 May 2005, Al-Mayouf came off the bench to replace the injured Mohamed Al-Deayea in the semi-finals of the Arab Champions League against Al-Ittihad. On 28 May 2005, Al-Mayouf once again replaced Al-Deayea due to injury in the league match against Al-Ittihad. This would be his last appearance for the club.

=== Al-Ahli ===
On 31 October 2007, Al-Mayouf joined Al-Ahli following his release by Al-Hilal. He made his debut on 30 December 2007 in the Prince Faisal bin Fahd Cup match against Al-Tai. He made his league debut for Al-Ahli on 13 January 2010 against Al-Qadsiah. He would go on and start the final seven league matches for Al-Ahli. Al-Mayouf also started the 2010 Saudi Crown Prince Cup Final loss against Al-Hilal. On 27 April 2012, Al-Mayouf scored his first goal for Al-Ahli in the King Cup match against Al-Faisaly. On 18 May 2012, Al-Mayouf started the King Cup final against Al-Nassr. On 10 November 2012, Al-Mayouf started 2012 AFC Champions League Final which Al-Ahli went on to lose 3–0 against South Korean side Ulsan Hyundai. On 26 April 2013, Al-Mayouf renewed his contract with Al-Ahli. On 14 February 2015, in the Crown Prince Cup final, Al-Mayouf was sent off and his replacement, Yasser Al-Mosailem, went on to save a penalty. In the 2015–16 season, Al-Mayouf was dropped in favour of Al-Mosailem and he made just eight appearances across all competitions. Following the expiration of his contract, Al-Mayouf refused to sign a new deal and left the club for personal reasons.

=== Al-Hilal ===
On 13 August 2016, Abdullah returned to Al-Hilal after nine years with Al-Ahli, signing a two-year contract. On 8 August 2016, Al-Mayouf made his debut against former club Al-Ahli in the 2016 Saudi Super Cup which Al-Hilal lost on penalty shootouts. On 13 August 2016, Abdullah made his league debut for Al-Hilal against Al-Batin and kept a clean sheet in the 2–0 win. On 4 May 2017, Abdullah played the final match of the league against Al-Nassr where they hammered them 5–1 and lifted the league title. He played all of the matches in the league that season. On 18 May 2017, Al-Mayouf played the final of the King Cup against his former club Al-Ahli which they won 3–2.

On 10 August 2017, Abdullah played the first match of the season against Al-Fayha, he saved a penalty which made Al-Hilal win 2–1. On 18 December, Abdullah played the AFC Champions League final's first leg against Urawa where they drew 1–1. After that, on 25 November Abdullah and Al-Hilal lost the final in the second leg after losing 0–1 against Urawa. On 1 December, Abdullah kept a clean sheet against Al-Ahli, which his team won the match 2–0.

On 22 April 2018, Al-Mayouf renewed his contract with Al-Hilal for another two years. On 5 February 2020, in the league match against Al-Raed, Al-Mayouf saved a penalty and went on to score one to help Al-Hilal win 3–1 and stay at top of the table. On 21 February 2020, Al-Mayouf renewed his contract for another three years. On 12 May 2023, he scored the winning penalty in a 7–6 victory in the shootouts against Al Wehda in the King Cup final.

=== Al-Ittihad ===
On 3 September 2023, Al-Mayouf signed a two-year contract with Al-Ittihad.

=== Al-Shabab ===
On 1 September 2024, Al-Mayouf joined Al-Shabab.

== International career ==
In June 2018 he was named in Saudi Arabia's squad for the 2018 FIFA World Cup in Russia and played in the tournament's opening match against the hosts. After the match, he was not selected to the two remaining games due to his dismal performance at the opening encounter. On 11 December 2019, it was announced that Al-Mayouf had retired from international football.

== Career statistics ==
=== Club ===
As of match played 27 May 2024

Appearances and goals by club, season and competition
Club	Season	League			King Cup		Crown Prince Cup		Continental (Note: Includes AFC Champions League)		Other		Total	
Club	Season	Division	Apps	Goals	Apps	Goals	Apps	Goals	Apps	Goals	Apps	Goals	Apps	Goals
Al-Hilal	2004–05	Saudi Pro League	2	0	—		0	0	—		2 (Note: Appearances in Arab Club Champions Cup)	0	4	0
Al-Hilal	2005–06	Saudi Pro League	0	0	—		0	0	0	0	0	0	0	0
Al-Hilal	2006–07	Saudi Pro League	0	0	—		0	0	0	0	0	0	0	0
Al-Hilal	Total		2	0	0	0	0	0	0	0	2	0	4	0
Al-Ahli	2007–08	Saudi Pro League	0	0	0	0	0	0	0	0	8 (Note: Appearances in Prince Faisal bin Fahd Cup)	0	8	0
Al-Ahli	2008–09	Saudi Pro League	0	0	0	0	0	0	—		0	0	0	0
Al-Ahli	2009–10	Saudi Pro League	7	0	0	0	4	0	2	0	4	0	17	0
Al-Ahli	2010–11	Saudi Pro League	5	0	0	0	0	0	—		—		5	0
Al-Ahli	2011–12	Saudi Pro League	0	0	5	1	2	0	5	0	—		12	1
Al-Ahli	2012–13	Saudi Pro League	14	0	0	0	2	0	11	0	—		27	0
Al-Ahli	2013–14	Saudi Pro League	23	0	6	0	2	0	2	0	—		33	0
Al-Ahli	2014–15	Saudi Pro League	25	0	2	0	5	0	9	0	—		41	0
Al-Ahli	2015–16	Saudi Pro League	4	0	2	0	0	0	2	0	—		8	0
Al-Ahli	Total		78	0	15	1	15	0	31	0	12	0	151	1
Al-Hilal	2016–17	Saudi Pro League	26	0	4	0	3	0	8	0	1 (Note: Appearance(s) in Saudi Super Cup)	0	42	0
Al-Hilal	2017–18	Saudi Pro League	13	0	0	0	—		7	0	—		20	0
Al-Hilal	2018–19	Saudi Pro League	10	0	2	0	—		6	0	7 1 (Note: Appearances in Saudi-Egyptian Super Cup)	0	26	0
Al-Hilal	2019–20	Saudi Pro League	27	1	4	0	—		13	0	3 (Note: Appearances in FIFA Club World Cup)	0	47	1
Al-Hilal	2020–21	Saudi Pro League	19	0	0	0	—		6	0	1	0	26	0
Al-Hilal	2021–22	Saudi Pro League	29	0	4	0	—		9	0	2 1	0	45	0
Al-Hilal	2022–23	Saudi Pro League	23	0	4	0	—		5	0	3 1	0	36	0
Al-Hilal	2023–24	Saudi Pro League	2	0	0	0	—		0	0	5	0	7	0
Al-Hilal	Total		149	1	18	0	3	0	54	0	25	0	249	1
Al-Ittihad	2023–24	Saudi Pro League	12	0	3	0	—		9	0	1 2	0	27	0
Career total			241	1	36	1	18	0	94	0	42	0	431	2

=== International ===
Statistics accurate as of match played 10 September 2019.

Saudi Arabia
Year	Apps	Goals
2010	1	0
2011	0	0
2012	0	0
2013	1	0
2014	1	0
2015	0	0
2016	0	0
2017	5	0
2018	4	0
2019	2	0
Total	14	0

== Honours ==
Al-Ahli

- Saudi Pro League: 2015–16
- King Cup: 2011, 2012, 2016
- Crown Prince Cup: 2014–15
- Gulf Club Champions Cup: 2008

Al-Hilal

- Saudi Pro League: 2016–17, 2017–18, 2019–20, 2020–21, 2021–22
- King Cup: 2017, 2019–20, 2022–23
- Saudi Super Cup: 2018, 2021
- AFC Champions League: 2019, 2021
- FIFA Club World Cup runner-up: 2022

Individual

- Saudi Pro League Goalkeeper of the Month: February 2020, October 2020, May & June 2022, August & September 2022
