= Abdullah Al-Hafith =

Saudi Arabian footballer

Abdullah Al Hafith
Personal information
- Full name: Abdullah Fareed Al Hafith
- Date of birth: December 25, 1992 (age 33)
- Place of birth: Dammam, Saudi Arabia
- Height: 1.88 m (6 ft 2 in)
- Position: Defender

Team information
- Current team: Al-Khaleej
- Number: 17

Senior career*
Years	Team	Apps	(Gls)
2011	Al-Ettifaq	1	(0)
2011–2012	Leiria	4	(0)
2012–2013	Paços Ferreira	0	(0)
2013–2020	Al-Hilal	48	(2)
2016	→ Hajer (loan)	13	(0)
2019	→ Al-Ettifaq (loan)	9	(0)
2020–2025	Al-Wehda	92	(3)
2021–2022	→ Al-Ittihad (loan)	8	(0)
2025–	Al-Khaleej	0	(0)

International career^{‡}
2011	Saudi Arabia U20	4	(0)
2014	Saudi Arabia U23	4	(1)
- * Club domestic league appearances and goals as of 20:31, 22 April 2025 (UTC) ‡ National team caps and goals as of 18:01, 13 January 2018 (UTC)

Abdullah Fareed Al Hafith (Arabic: عَبْد الله فَرِيد الْحَافِظ, born 25 December 1992) is a Saudi Arabian footballer, who plays as a defender for Saudi Pro League team Al-Khaleej.

== Personal life ==
Abdullah is the brother of the player Ibrahim Al-Hafith.

== Club career ==
He started his career with Al-Ittifaq in the Saudi Professional League. He joined Portuguese club Leiria in 2011. After the club was relegated in 2012, he joined Paços Ferreira.

=== Al-Hilal ===
In 2013, Abdullah joined Al-Hilal. On 10 August 2017, Abdulla scored his first goal for Al-Hilal against Al-Fayha. On 8 January 2018, Abdullah scored his second goal against his former club Ettifaq in stoppage time of the first half, but Al-Hilal drew 1–1 in that match.

=== Al-Ittihad ===
On 18 August 2021, Al-Hafith joined Al-Ittihad on loan until the end of the 2021–22 season.

=== Al-Khaleej ===
On 6 September 2025, Al-Hafith Al-Khaleej on a three-year deal.

== Career statistics ==
=== Club ===
As of match played 30 May 2025

Club	Season	League		National Cup		League Cup		Continental		Other		Total	
Club	Season	Apps	Goals	Apps	Goals	Apps	Goals	Apps	Goals	Apps	Goals	Apps	Goals
Al-Ettifaq	2011–12	1	0	0	0	0	0	0	0	—		1	0
União de Leiria	2011–12	4	0	0	0	0	0	—		—		4	0
Paços de Ferreira	2012–13	0	0	0	0	0	0	—		—		0	0
Al-Hilal	2013–14	1	0	1	0	0	0	0	0	—		2	0
Al-Hilal	2014–15	2	0	1	0	1	0	0	0	—		4	0
Al-Hilal	2015–16	1	0	0	0	0	0	0	0	0	0	1	0
Al-Hilal	2016–17	16	0	3	0	2	0	11	0	0	0	32	0
Al-Hilal	2017–18	13	2	0	0	—		1	0	—		14	2
Al-Hilal	2018–19	0	0	0	0	—		4	1	0	0	4	1
Al-Hilal	2019–20	15	0	1	0	—		3	0	1 (Note: Appearances in FIFA Club World Cup)	0	20	0
Al-Hilal	Total	48	2	6	0	3	0	19	1	1	0	77	3
Hajer (loan)	2015–16	13	0	1	0	0	0	—		—		14	0
Al-Ettifaq (loan)	2018–19	9	0	0	0	—		—		—		9	0
Al-Wehda	2020–21	22	0	0	0	—		1	0	—		23	0
Al-Wehda	2022–23	20	1	3	0	—		—		—		23	1
Al-Wehda	2023–24	24	1	2	0	—		—		1 (Note: Appearance(s) in Saudi Super Cup)	0	27	1
Al-Wehda	2024–25	26	1	2	0	—		—		—		28	1
Al-Wehda	Total	92	3	7	0	0	0	1	0	1	0	101	3
Al-Ittihad (loan)	2021–22	8	0	2	0	—		—		—		10	0
Al-Khaleej	2025–26	0	0	0	0	—		—		—		0	0
Career totals		175	5	16	0	3	0	20	1	2	0	216	6

== Honours ==
=== Club ===
Al-Hilal

- Saudi Professional League: 2016–17, 2017–18, 2019–20
- King Cup: 2015, 2017
- Saudi Super Cup: 2015, 2018
- AFC Champions League: 2019
