= Naif Kariri =

Saudi Arabian footballer

Personal information
- Full name: Naif Mohammed Kariri
- Date of birth: 16 April 1998 (age 28)
- Place of birth: Sabya, Saudi Arabia
- Height: 1.64 m (5 ft 4 1/2 in)
- Positions: Full-back; winger

Team information
- Current team: Al-Jandal
- Number: 38

Youth career
- –2014: Hetten
- 2014–2018: Al-Hilal

Senior career*
Years	Team	Apps	(Gls)
2017–2019	Al-Hilal	0	(0)
2018–2019	→ Al-Fayha (loan)	3	(0)
2019–2020	Ohod	36	(3)
2020–2024	Al-Wehda	21	(0)
2022–2023	→ Al-Ahli (loan)	10	(0)
2025–	Al-Jandal	0	(0)

International career
2016–2018	Saudi Arabia U20		
- * Club domestic league appearances and goals as of 31 May 2022

Naif Kariri (Arabic: نايف كريري; born 16 April 1998) is a Saudi Arabian professional footballer who plays as a right back for Al-Jandal.

== Career ==
Kariri started his career at the youth teams of Hetten before joining Al-Hilal in 2014. He made his first-team debut in 2017 against Sudanese club Al-Merrikh. On 8 July 2018, Kariri and Abdulrahman Al-Yami both joined Al-Fayha on season-long loans from Al-Hilal. He ended the season making 4 appearances across all competitions. On 23 July 2019, Kariri left Al-Hilal and joined MS League side Ohod. On 28 September 2020, Kariri left Ohod and joined Al-Wehda. On 4 September 2022, Kariri joined Al-Ahli on loan. On 11 September 2025, Kariri joined Al-Jandal.

Kariri participated in the 2017 FIFA U-20 World Cup with the Saudi Arabia U20 national team, where they were eliminated in the Round of 16.

== Career statistics ==
=== Club ===
As of match played 31 May 2024

Club	Season	League		King Cup		Asia		Other		Total	
Club	Season	Apps	Goals	Apps	Goals	Apps	Goals	Apps	Goals	Apps	Goals
Al-Hilal	2017–18	0	0	0	0	0	0	3 (Note: Appearances in Arab Club Championship)	0	3	0
Al-Fayha (loan)	2018–19	3	0	1	0	—		—		4	0
Ohod	2019–20	36	3	1	0	—		—		37	3
Al-Wehda	2020–21	13	0	1	0	0	0	—		14	0
Al-Wehda	2021–22	5	0	—		—		—		5	0
Al-Wehda	2023–24	3	0	1	0	0	0	—		4	0
Al-Wehda	Total	21	0	2	0	0	0	0	0	23	0
Al-Ahli (loan)	2022–23	10	0	—		—		—		10	0
Career totals		70	3	4	0	0	0	3	0	77	3
