= Sultan Al-Sawadi =

Saudi Arabian footballer

Personal information
- Full name: Sultan Ali Al-Sawadi
- Date of birth: 14 December 1992 (age 33)
- Place of birth: Jeddah, Saudi Arabia
- Height: 1.68 m (5 ft 6 in)
- Position: Winger

Team information
- Current team: Al-Arabi
- Number: 49

Youth career
- Al-Ahli

Senior career*
Years	Team	Apps	(Gls)
2012–2016	Al-Ahli	34	(4)
2015	→ Al-Taawoun (loan)	11	(1)
2015–2016	→ Al-Raed (loan)	17	(1)
2016–2020	Al-Raed	61	(7)
2020–2023	Al-Wehda	58	(5)
2023–2025	Neom	36	(7)
2025–	Al-Arabi	0	(0)
- * Club domestic league appearances and goals

Sultan Al-Sawadi (Arabic: سلطان السوادي; born 14 December 1992) is a Saudi Arabian professional footballer who plays as a winger for Al-Arabi.

== Career ==
Al-Sawadi started his career at the youth team of Al-Ahli. Al-Sawadi made his first-team debut on 27 April 2012, in the King Cup match against Al-Faisaly. He signed his first professional contract with the club on 25 June 2012. On 5 January 2015, Al-Sawadi joined Al-Taawoun on loan. On 4 July 2015, Al-Sawadi was loaned out to Al-Raed. On 20 July 2016, Al-Sawadi was released from his contract by Al-Ahli. On 26 July 2016, Al-Sawadi joined Al-Raed on a permanent deal. On 9 March 2017, Al-Sawadi renewed his contract with Al-Raed, signing a three-year deal. On 20 January 2020, Al-Sawadi joined Al-Wehda on a free transfer. On 12 July 2022, Al-Sawadi renewed his contract with Al-Wehda. On 19 September 2023, Al-Sawadi joined Saudi Second Division side Neom on a free transfer. On 28 August 2025, Al-Sawadi joined Al-Arabi.

== Career statistics ==
=== Club ===
As of match played 30 May 2022

Appearances and goals by club, season and competition
Club	Season	League			King Cup		Asia		Other		Total	
Club	Season	Division	Apps	Goals	Apps	Goals	Apps	Goals	Apps	Goals	Apps	Goals
Al-Ahli	2011–12	Pro League	0	0	1	0	1	0	0	0	2	0
Al-Ahli	2012–13	Pro League	11	1	4	0	8	1	1 (Note: Appearances in Crown Prince Cup)	0	24	2
Al-Ahli	2013–14	Pro League	21	3	4	0	—		3	0	28	3
Al-Ahli	2014–15	Pro League	2	0	0	0	0	0	1	0	3	0
Al-Ahli	Total		34	4	9	0	9	1	5	0	57	5
Al-Taawoun (loan)	2014–15	Pro League	11	1	2	1	—		5 (Note: Appearances in GCC Champions League)	1	18	3
Al-Raed (loan)	2015–16	Pro League	17	1	2	0	—		1	0	20	1
Al-Raed	2016–17	Pro League	26	4	2	0	—		0	0	28	4
Al-Raed	2017–18	Pro League	23	3	0	0	—		2 (Note: Appearance in Relegation play-offs)	0	25	3
Al-Raed	2018–19	Pro League	9	0	0	0	—		—		9	0
Al-Raed	2019–20	Pro League	3	0	1	0	—		—		4	0
Al-Raed	Total		61	7	3	0	0	0	2	0	66	7
Al-Wehda	2019–20	Pro League	6	0	0	0	—		—		6	0
Al-Wehda	2020–21	Pro League	4	0	0	0	0	0	—		4	0
Al-Wehda	2021–22	First Division	31	4	—		—		—		31	4
Al-Wehda	2022–23	Pro League	17	1	2	0	—		—		19	1
Al-Wehda	Total		58	5	2	0	0	0	0	0	60	5
Career total			181	18	18	1	9	1	13	1	221	21

== Honours ==
Al-Ahli

- King Cup: 2012

Al-Wehda

- First Division third place: 2021–22 (promotion to Pro League)

Neom

- Saudi Second Division League: 2023–24
