= Hazzaa Al-Ghamdi =

Saudi Arabian footballer

Hazzaa Al-Ghamdi هزاع الغامدي
Personal information
- Full name: Hazzaa Ahmed Al-Ghamdi
- Date of birth: 11 January 2001 (age 25)
- Place of birth: Saudi Arabia
- Position: Winger

Team information
- Current team: Damac
- Number: 90

Youth career
- Al-Wehda

Senior career*
Years	Team	Apps	(Gls)
2020–2024	Al-Wehda	86	(6)
2024–	Damac	0	(0)

International career
2019–2020	Saudi Arabia U20		
2021–	Saudi Arabia U23		
Medal record
Men's football
Representing Saudi Arabia
Islamic Solidarity Games
Silver medal – second place	2021 Konya
- * Club domestic league appearances and goals as of 22 May 2023

Hazzaa Ahmed Al-Ghamdi (Arabic: هزاع أحمد الغامدي; born 11 January 2001), is a Saudi Arabian professional footballer who plays as a winger for Damac.

== Career ==
Al-Ghamdi started his career at the youth team of Al-Wehda and represented the club at every level. On 23 August 2024, Al-Ghamdi joined Damac on a two-year deal.

== Career statistics ==
=== Club ===
As of 27 May 2024.

Club	Season	League			Cup		Continental		Other		Total	
Club	Season	Division	Apps	Goals	Apps	Goals	Apps	Goals	Apps	Goals	Apps	Goals
Al-Wehda	2020–21	Pro League	11	2	0	0	1	0	—		12	2
Al-Wehda	2021–22	First Division	33	2	—		—		—		33	2
Al-Wehda	2022–23	Pro League	20	2	2	0	—		—		22	2
Al-Wehda	2023–24	Pro League	22	0	0	0	—		1	0	23	0
Al-Wehda	Club totals		86	6	2	0	1	0	1	0	90	6
Career totals			86	6	2	0	1	0	1	0	90	6
