= Abdulkareem Al-Qahtani =

Saudi Arabian footballer

Personal information
- Full name: Abdulkareem Aiedh Al-Qahtani
- Date of birth: 9 February 1993 (age 33)
- Place of birth: Saudi Arabia
- Height: 1.75 m (5 ft 9 in)
- Position: Midfielder

Team information
- Current team: Al-Batin
- Number: 8

Youth career
- Al-Hilal

Senior career*
Years	Team	Apps	(Gls)
2015–2017	Al-Hilal	1	(0)
2016–2017	→ Al-Raed (loan)	25	(4)
2017–2020	Al-Fayha	46	(3)
2020–2024	Al-Wehda	9	(0)
2021–2022	→ Al-Tai (loan)	10	(0)
2024–	Al-Batin	0	(0)

International career^{‡}
2014	Saudi Arabia U23	5	(0)
2014–	Saudi Arabia	4	(0)
- * Club domestic league appearances and goals as of 22:12, 16 May 2019 (UTC) ‡ National team caps and goals as of 22:44, 10 August 2019 (UTC)

Abdulkareem Aiedh Al-Qahtani (Arabic: عبد الكريم عايض القحطاني; born 9 February 1993) is a Saudi footballer who plays as a midfielder for Al-Batin.

== Club career ==
=== Al-Hilal ===
In 2015, Abdulkareem was promoted to the first team from the academy team. On 12 May, he played his debut in last fixture of the league against Al-Faisaly which ended 0-0.

=== Al-Raed (loan) ===
On 4 July 2016, Abdulkareem went on loan to Al-Raed. He played his debut for Al-Raed against Ittihad. He scored his first goal in professional football on 20 October against Al-Faisaly which made them win 0–1. After that match, he scored again against Ettifaq, That match ended 0–2. His first yellow card was against Al-Ahli. Al-Raed wanted to renew the loan because of his great form, but he refused and wanted to go back. He ended his loan on 30 June 2017.

=== Al-Fayha ===
On 5 August 2017, Al-Fayha signed Abdulkareem Al-Qahtani for an undisclosed fee with a three-year contract.

=== Al-Tai ===
On 31 August 2021, Al-Qahtani joined Al-Tai on loan from Al-Wehda.

=== Al-Batin ===
On 20 August 2024, Al-Qahtani joined Al-Batin.

== International career ==
In 2014, Abdulkareem was chosen to play for Saudi Arabia U-23 in the Asian Games. He played his debut for Saudi Arabia against Qatar in 2014 WAFF Championship as a substitute in the 64 minute, they lost the match 4–1.

== Statistics ==
As of 2 February 2018

Club	Season	Saudi Premier League		Crown Prince Cup		Saudi Champions Cup		Saudi Super Cup		AFC Champions League		Total	
Club	Season	Apps	Goals	Apps	Goals	Apps	Goals	Apps	Goals	Apps	Goals	Apps	Goals
Al-Hilal
Al-Hilal	2015–16	1	0	1	0	0	0	0	0	0	0	2	0
Al-Raed (loan)
Al-Raed (loan)	2016–17	25	4	1	0	1	0	–	–	–	–	27	4
Al-Fayha
Al-Fayha	2017–18	10	0	1	0	0	0	–	–	–	–	11	0
Career total		36	4	3	0	1	0	0	0	0	0	40	4

== Hounors ==
=== Al-Hilal ===
- Saudi Crown Prince Cup (1): 2015–16
