= Abdulaziz Noor =

Saudi footballer

Personal information
- Full name: Abdulaziz Noor Sheikh
- Date of birth: 18 January 1999 (age 27)
- Place of birth: Jeddah, Saudi Arabia
- Height: 1.74 m (5 ft 8 1/2 in)
- Position: Winger

Team information
- Current team: Neom
- Number: 24

Youth career
- –2020: Al-Ahli

Senior career*
Years	Team	Apps	(Gls)
2020–2022	Al-Nahda	45	(9)
2022–2025	Al-Wehda	65	(12)
2025–	Neom	11	(0)
- * Club domestic league appearances and goals as of 5 November 2026

Abdulaziz Noor (Arabic: عبدالعزيز نور; born 18 January 1999) is a Saudi Arabian footballer of Sudanese and Somali heritage who plays as a winger for Saudi Pro League club Neom.

== Career ==
Abdulaziz Noor began his career at the youth teams of Al-Ahli. On 25 August 2019, Noor signed his first professional contract with the club. On 11 October 2020, Noor along with Bader Munshi and Bader Al-Johani were released from their contracts by the club. In the same month, Noor joined First Division side Al-Nahda. On 13 January 2021, Noor made his debut for Al-Nahda in a 1–0 loss against Al-Khaleej. On 3 March 2021, Noor scored his first goal for the club in a 2–2 draw against Al-Sahel. On 11 July 2022, Noor joined Pro League side Al-Wehda on a three-year deal. Noor made his Pro League debut on 8 September 2022 by starting in the 1–0 win against Abha. On 27 May 2023, Noor scored his first goal for Al-Wehda in the 2–1 win against Al-Tai.

On 18 July 2025, Noor joined Neom.
