= Amiri Kurdi =

Saudi Arabian footballer

Amiri Kurdı
Personal information
- Full name: Amiri Fahad Sadeeq Kurdi
- Date of birth: 11 September 1991 (age 35)
- Place of birth: Jeddah, Saudi Arabia
- Height: 1.80 m (5 ft 11 in)
- Position: Right back

Youth career
- 2004–2009: Panionios

Senior career*
Years	Team	Apps	(Gls)
2009–2014	Panionios	62	(2)
2014–2018	Al Ahli	25	(0)
2018–2019	Panionios	19	(0)
2019–2022	Al-Hilal	14	(0)
2022–2023	Al-Wehda	15	(0)
2023–2024	Al-Riyadh	11	(0)
- * Club domestic league appearances and goals as of 31 May 2023

Amiri Fahad Sadeeq Kurdi (Greek: Αμίρι Κούρντι, born 11 September 1991) is a Saudi Arabian professional footballer who plays as a right back. He also has Greek citizenship.

== Career ==
On 7 August 2023, Kurdi joined Al-Riyadh.

== Personal life ==
Kurdi was born in Saudi Arabia to a Saudi Arabian father and Greek mother.

== Honours ==
Al-Ahli

- Saudi Pro League: 2015–16
- King Cup: 2016
- Crown Prince Cup: 2014–15
- Saudi Super Cup: 2016

Al-Hilal

- Saudi Pro League: 2019–20, 2020–21
- King Cup: 2019–20
- AFC Champions League: 2019, 2021
