= Alaa Al-Hejji =

Saudi Arabian footballer

Alaa Al Hejji
Personal information
- Full name: Alaa Haji Al Hejji
- Date of birth: 3 December 1995 (age 30)
- Place of birth: Saudi Arabia
- Height: 1.78 m (5 ft 10 in)
- Position: Midfielder

Team information
- Current team: Neom
- Number: 18

Youth career
- Al-Khaleej

Senior career*
| Years | Team | Apps | (Gls) |
| 2015–2020 | Al-Khaleej | 82 | (9) |
| 2020–2025 | Al-Wehda | 137 | (6) |
| 2025– | Neom | 30 | (4) |

International career^{‡}
| 2026– | Saudi Arabia | 7 | (0) |
- * Club domestic league appearances and goals as of 5 November 2026 ‡ National team caps and goals as of 26 September 2026

Alaa Haji Al Hejji (Arabic: علاء آل حجي; born 3 December 1995) is a Saudi Arabian professional footballer who plays for Neom in the Saudi Professional League and the Saudi Arabia national team.

== Club Career ==
On 7 March 2020, Al Hejji joined Al-Wehda on a pre-contract agreement. He officially joined the club following the conclusion of the 2019–20 season.

On 17 July 2025, Al Hejji joined newly-promoted Saudi Pro League club Neom.

== International Career ==
On 31 May 2026, he was named in the 26-man squad for the 2026 FIFA World Cup.
