= Karim Yoda =

French professional footballer (born 1988)

Personal information
- Full name: Abdoul Karim Yoda
- Date of birth: 25 October 1988 (age 38)
- Place of birth: Annemasse, France
- Height: 1.82 m (5 ft 11 1/2 in)
- Position: Midfielder

Team information
- Current team: Al-Raed
- Number: 10

Youth career
- 2000–2007: Servette

Senior career*
Years	Team	Apps	(Gls)
2006–2009	Servette	54	(4)
2009–2013	Sion	64	(5)
2013–2014	Astra Giurgiu	21	(2)
2014–2018	Getafe	44	(4)
2017	→ Almería (loan)	3	(0)
2017–2018	→ Reus (loan)	22	(0)
2018	Reus	0	(0)
2019	Karpaty Lviv	10	(1)
2019–2020	Racing Santander	15	(7)
2020–2021	Al-Hazem	49	(14)
2021–2023	Al-Wehda	41	(8)
2023–2024	Al-Adalah	33	(11)
2024–2025	Al-Hazem	31	(8)
2025–	Al-Raed	0	(0)
- * Club domestic league appearances and goals as of 18 May 2023

Abdoul Karim Yoda (born 25 October 1988) is a French professional footballer who plays as a midfielder for Al-Raed.

== Club career ==
Born in Annemasse, Yoda joined Servette FC's youth system in 2000, aged 11. He made his senior debuts in 2006, and scored his first professional goal in the following year. In June 2009 Yoda moved to fellow league team FC Sion. He appeared regularly in his first two campaigns, but fell in the pecking order during his two last.

On 2 September 2013 Yoda moved to Romania, signing a three-year deal with FC Astra Giurgiu He appeared in 21 matches during his only season, scoring twice.

On 14 July 2014 Yoda moved teams and countries again, by agreeing to a two-year deal with La Liga side Getafe CF. He made his debut in the competition on 25 September, starting in a 0–2 away loss against RCD Espanyol.

Yoda scored his first goals in the main category of Spanish football on 20 October, netting a brace in a 2–1 away win against Real Sociedad. On 31 January 2017, he moved to Segunda División club UD Almería on loan until the end of the season, with Chuli moving in the opposite direction.

On 22 November 2017, Yoda was loaned to CF Reus Deportiu in the second level, until the following June, and signed a permanent two-year contract the following 31 July 2018. However, he was one of the four players who were not registered for the new season due to the club's wage limit, and left the club after it was expelled by the LFP the following January.

In February 2019, Yoda signed a two-and-a-half-year contract with Ukrainian Premier League side FC Karpaty Lviv. On 23 July, however, he returned to Spain and its second division, after agreeing to a two-year deal with Racing de Santander. On 23 January 2020, Al-Hazem has signed with Karim Yoda from Racing de Santander. On 17 August 2021, Yoda joined Al-Wehda. On 17 June 2023, Yoda joined Al-Adalah. On 5 September 2025, Yoda joined Al-Raed.

== Personal life ==
Born in France, Yoda is of Ivorian and Burkinabe descent.

== Honours ==
Sion

- Swiss Cup: 2010–11

Astra Giurgiu

- Cupa României: 2013–14

Al-Hazem

- MS League: 2020–21
