= Waleed Bakshween =

Saudi Arabian footballer

Personal information
- Full name: Waleed Rashid Bakshween
- Date of birth: 12 November 1989 (age 37)
- Place of birth: Jeddah, Saudi Arabia
- Height: 1.76 m (5 ft 9 in)
- Position: Defensive midfielder

Senior career*
Years	Team	Apps	(Gls)
2008–2018	Al-Ahli	113	(1)
2018–2025	Al-Wehda	163	(1)

International career^{‡}
2014–2017	Saudi Arabia	16	(0)
- * Club domestic league appearances and goals as of 16:31, 27 May 2024 (UTC) ‡ National team caps and goals as of 15:14, 11 September 2026 (UTC)

Waleed Bakshween (Arabic: وليد باخشوين; born 12 November 1989) is a Saudi professional footballer who plays as a defensive midfielder former the Saudi Arabia national team.

== Honours ==
=== Club ===
Al-Ahli

Winner

- King Cup of Champions: 2011, 2012, 2016
- Saudi Crown Prince Cup: 2014–15
- Saudi Professional League: 2015–16
- Saudi Super Cup: 2016

Runner-up

- Saudi Professional League: 2011–12, 2014–15
- AFC Champions League: 2012
- King Cup of Champions: 2014
- Saudi Crown Prince Cup: 2015-16
