= Abdulelah Bukhari =

Saudi footballer

Personal information
- Full name: Abdulelah Abdulaziz Bukhari
- Date of birth: July 18, 1994 (age 32)
- Place of birth: Saudi Arabia
- Height: 1.77 m (5 ft 9 1/2 in)
- Position: Left-back

Team information
- Current team: Al-Jabalain
- Number: 33

Youth career
- Al Ahli

Senior career*
Years	Team	Apps	(Gls)
2015–2017	Al-Ahli	0	(0)
2016–2017	→ Al-Khaleej (loan)	14	(0)
2017–2018	Al-Ettifaq	0	(0)
2018–2019	Al-Kawkab		
2019–2020	Al-Khaleej	35	(0)
2020–2021	Al-Jabalain	30	(0)
2021–2024	Al-Wehda	51	(0)
2024–	Al-Jabalain	59	(1)
- * Club domestic league appearances and goals as of 27 May 2024

Abdulelah Bukhari (Arabic: عبدالإله بخاري; born July 18, 1994) is a Saudi football player who plays as a left back.

== Honours ==
Al-Ahli
