= Anselmo (footballer, born 1989) =

Brazilian footballer

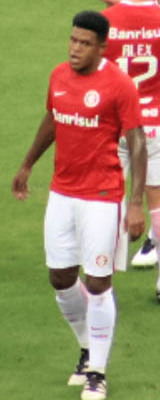

Personal information
- Full name: Anselmo de Moraes
- Date of birth: 20 February 1989 (age 37)
- Place of birth: São Paulo, Brazil
- Height: 1.85 m (6 ft 1 in)
- Position: Defensive midfielder

Team information
- Current team: Adelaide United
- Number: 87

Youth career
- 2004–2009: Palmeiras

Senior career*
Years	Team	Apps	(Gls)
2010–2012	Palmeiras	0	(0)
2011	→ Grêmio Barueri (loan)	19	(1)
2012	→ São Caetano (loan)	3	(0)
2012–2013	Genoa	5	(0)
2013	Palermo	5	(1)
2013–2014	São Caetano	20	(1)
2014–2016	Joinville	31	(1)
2016–2018	Internacional	17	(0)
2017–2018	→ Sport Recife (loan)	40	(5)
2018–2024	Al-Wehda	128	(22)
2021–2022	→ Al-Nassr (loan)	20	(0)
2025	Johor Darul Ta'zim	0	(0)
2025–	Adelaide United	12	(2)

International career
- Brazil U-20
- * Club domestic league appearances and goals as of 4 January 2026

Anselmo de Moraes (Brazilian Portuguese: [ɐ̃ˈsew.mu dʒi moˈɾajs]; born 20 February 1989), or simply Anselmo, is a Brazilian professional footballer who plays as a defensive midfielder for Australian club Adelaide United.

== Career ==
=== Palmeiras ===
Anselmo made his debut for Palmeiras as a second-half substitute in a Campeonato Paulista 2010 match against Monte Azul on 27 January 2010. In 2011 goes on loan to the Campeonato Brasileiro Série B club Grêmio Barueri, while in 2012, is on loan to another Campeonato Brasileiro Série B club, São Caetano.

=== Italy ===
On 30 July 2012 he moved to the Serie A club Genoa for €900,000 in installments. Made his debut in Serie A on September 23 in the match won 1-0 over Lazio. In January 2013 he was sold to Palermo in an exchange deal for right back Eros Pisano. Both clubs retained 50% registration rights, valued €700,000. Palermo relegated at the end of season. In June 2013 Genoa gave up the registration rights of Anselmo to Palermo, as well as acquired Pisano outright for €531,000. On 16 July 2013 Anselmo and Palermo mutually agreed to terminate the contract.

Palmeiras later sued Genoa to FIFA for unpaid €600,000 transfer fee. However Genoa still did not pay Palmeiras in time.

=== Return to Brazil ===
On 26 July 2013, he was re-signed by São Caetano in 2-year contract. On 14 August 2014, Joinville acquired 50% economic rights (as well as full registration rights) of Anselmo. In 2016, Anselmo joined Brasileiro Série A club Internacional on a three-year contract.

== Career statistics ==
=== Club ===
As of 22 May 2024

Club	Season	League			State League		Cup		Continental		Other		Total	
Club	Season	Division	Apps	Goals	Apps	Goals	Apps	Goals	Apps	Goals	Apps	Goals	Apps	Goals
Palmeiras	2010	Série A	—		2 (Note: Appearance(s) in Campeonato Paulista Série A1)	0	—		—		—		2	0
Palmeiras B	2011	—	—		10 (Note: Appearance(s) in Campeonato Paulista Série A2)	1	—		—		—		10	1
Grêmio Barueri (loan)	2011	Série B	19	1	—		—		—		—		19	1
São Caetano (loan)	2012	Série B	3	0	14	0	—		—		—		17	0
Genoa	2012-13	Serie A	5	0	—		—		—		—		5	0
Palermo	2012-13	Serie A	5	1	—		—		—		—		5	1
São Caetano	2013	Série B	18	1	—		—		—		1 (Note: Appearance(s) in Copa Paulista)	0	19	1
São Caetano	2014	Série C	2	0	11	1	—		—		—		13	1
São Caetano	Total		20	1	11	1	—		—		1	0	32	2
Joinville	2014	Série B	17	1	—		—		—		—		17	1
Joinville	2015	Série A	29	0	4 (Note: Appearance(s) in Campeonato Catarinense)	0	—		1 (Note: Appearance(s) in Copa Sudamericana)	0	—		34	0
Joinville	2016	Série B	—		17	1	2	0	—		—		19	1
Joinville	Total		46	1	21	1	2	0	1	0	—		70	2
Internacional	2016	Série A	17	0	—		—		—		—		17	0
Internacional	2017	Série B	0	0	12 (Note: Appearance(s) in Campeonato Gaúcho)	0	2	0	—		2 (Note: Appearance(s) in Primeira Liga)	0	16	0
Internacional	Total		17	0	12	0	2	0	—		2	0	33	0
Sport Recife (loan)	2017	Série A	21	0	—		—		4	0	—		25	0
Sport Recife (loan)	2018	Série A	8	2	11 (Note: Appearance(s) in Campeonato Pernambucano)	4	2	1	—		—		21	7
Sport Recife (loan)	Total		29	2	11	4	2	1	4	0	—		46	7
Al Wehda	2018-19	Saudi Pro League	20	0	—		—		—		—		20	0
Al Wehda	2019-20	Saudi Pro League	25	10	—		2	0	—		—		27	10
Al Wehda	2020-21	Saudi Pro League	26	4	—		1	0	1 (Note: Appearance(s) in AFC Champions League)	0	—		28	4
Al Wehda	2022-23	Saudi Pro League	27	3	—		4	2	—		—		31	5
Al Wehda	2023-24	Saudi Pro League	30	5	—		2	0	—		1 (Note: Appearance(s) in Saudi Super Cup)	0	33	5
Al Wehda	Total		128	22	—		9	2	1	0	1	0	139	24
Al Nassr	2021-22	Saudi Pro League	20	0	—		2	0	—		—		22	0
Career Total			292	28	81	7	17	3	6	0	4	0	400	38

== Honours ==
Joinville

- Brazilian Série B: 2014

Johor Darul Ta'zim

- Malaysia Super League: 2024–25
- Malaysia Cup: 2024–25
