= 2024–25 Al-Khaleej FC season =

Al-Khaleej
2024–25 season
- President: Alaa Al-Heml
- Manager: Georgios Donis
- Stadium: Prince Mohamed bin Fahd Stadium
- Pro League: 12th
- King's Cup: Round of 32 (knocked out by Al-Tai)
- Top goalscorer: League: Abdullah Al-Salem (10 goals); All: Abdulla Al Salem (11 goals)
- Highest home attendance: 17,150 v Al-Hilal; 23 November 2024; Saudi Pro League; 17,150 v Al-Ittihad; 26 February 2025; Saudi Pro League
- Lowest home attendance: 1,073 v Al-Fayha; 20 September 2024; Saudi Pro League
- Average home league attendance: 4,623
- All statistics correct as of 26 May 2025.

The 2024–25 season was Al-Khaleej's 80th year in existence and their 10th non-consecutive season in the Pro League. The club participated in the Pro League, and the King's Cup.

The season covers the period from 1 July 2024 to 30 June 2025.

== Players ==
=== Squad information ===
As of 1 February 2025

Note: Flags indicate national team as defined under FIFA eligibility rules; some limited exceptions apply. Players may hold more than one non-FIFA nationality.

No.	Pos.	Nation	Player
2	DF	KSA	Omar Al-Owdah
3	DF	KSA	Mohammed Al-Khabrani
5	DF	POR	Pedro Rebocho
8	MF	KSA	Khaled Al-Samiri
9	FW	EGY	Mohamed Sherif
10	MF	POR	Fábio Martins (captain)
11	FW	KSA	Abdullah Al-Salem
14	DF	KSA	Ali Al-Shaafi
15	MF	KSA	Mansour Hamzi
17	MF	GRE	Kostas Fortounis
18	MF	KSA	Murad Hawsawi (on loan from Ohod)
19	MF	KSA	Mohammed Al-Abdullah
20	DF	KSA	Abdullah Al-Fahad
21	MF	GRE	Dimitrios Kourbelis
22	GK	KSA	Raed Ozaybi

No.	Pos.	Nation	Player
23	GK	BIH	Ibrahim Šehić
24	FW	KSA	Ali Abdulraouf
25	DF	KSA	Arif Al Haydar
31	GK	KSA	Mohammed Al-Ghanem
32	DF	COD	Marcel Tisserand (on loan from Al-Ettifaq)
33	DF	KSA	Bander Nasser
35	GK	KSA	Rayan Al-Dossari
39	DF	KSA	Saeed Al Hamsal
43	MF	KSA	Hassan Al-Musallam (on loan from Al-Ettifaq)
47	MF	KSA	Saleh Aboulshamat
48	FW	GAM	Babucarr Seye
66	DF	KSA	Theyab Absa
70	FW	KSA	Abdulmajeed Al-Khathami
71	FW	KSA	Hussain Al-Sultan
99	MF	AUT	Thomas Murg (on loan from PAOK)

=== Out on loan ===
Note: Flags indicate national team as defined under FIFA eligibility rules; some limited exceptions apply. Players may hold more than one non-FIFA nationality.

No. / Pos. / Nation / Player; 16 / DF / KSA / Mohammed Al-Khaibari (at Damac until 30 June 2025)	No. / Pos. / Nation / Player; 96 / GK / KSA / Marwan Al-Haidari (at Al-Ettifaq until 30 June 2025)

== Transfers and loans ==
=== Transfers in ===
Entry date	Position	No.	Player	From club	Fee	Ref.
30 June 2024	DF	16	(Saudi Arabia) Mohammed Al-Khaibari	(Saudi Arabia) Al-Najma	End of loan	
30 June 2024	MF	17	(Saudi Arabia) Hassan Al-Majhad	(Saudi Arabia) Al-Adalah	End of loan	
30 June 2024	MF	21	(Saudi Arabia) Hussain Al-Ohaymid	(Saudi Arabia) Al-Noor	End of loan	
30 June 2024	FW	77	(Saudi Arabia) Hisham Al Dubais	(Saudi Arabia) Al-Jabalain	End of loan	
22 July 2024	MF	47	(Saudi Arabia) Saleh Aboulshamat	(Saudi Arabia) Al-Qadsiah	Undisclosed	
23 July 2024	DF	20	(Saudi Arabia) Abdullah Al-Fahad	(Saudi Arabia) Al-Raed	Free	
20 August 2024	MF	21	(Greece) Dimitrios Kourbelis	(Turkey) Trabzonspor	Free	
30 August 2024	MF	17	(Greece) Kostas Fortounis	(Greece) Olympiacos	Free	

=== Loans in ===
Start date	End date	Position	No.	Player	From club	Fee	Ref.
23 July 2024	End of season	MF	18	(Saudi Arabia) Murad Hawsawi	(Saudi Arabia) Ohod	None	
18 August 2024	End of season	DF	32	(Democratic Republic of the Congo) Marcel Tisserand	(Saudi Arabia) Al-Ettifaq	None	
30 January 2025	End of season	MF	99	(Austria) Thomas Murg	(Greece) PAOK	None	
31 January 2025	End of season	MF	43	(Saudi Arabia) Hassan Al-Musallam	(Saudi Arabia) Al-Ettifaq	None	

=== Transfers out ===
Exit date	Position	No.	Player	To club	Fee	Ref.
30 June 2024	MF	18	(Saudi Arabia) Abdulelah Hawsawi	(Saudi Arabia) Al-Ittihad	End of loan	
30 June 2024	MF	88	(Saudi Arabia) Naif Masoud	(Saudi Arabia) Al-Qadsiah	End of loan	
9 July 2024	MF	55	(South Korea) Jung Woo-young	(South Korea) Ulsan HD	Free	
14 July 2024	MF	27	(Saudi Arabia) Fawaz Al-Torais	(Saudi Arabia) Al-Orobah	Free	
17 August 2024	MF	8	(Portugal) Ivo Rodrigues	(Portugal) Arouca	Free	
17 August 2024	DF	66	(Saudi Arabia) Hussein Freij	(Saudi Arabia) Al-Hazem	Free	
17 August 2024	MF	17	(Saudi Arabia) Hassan Al-Majhad	(Saudi Arabia) Al-Adalah	Free	
20 August 2024	DF	13	(Saudi Arabia) Abdullah Al-Shanqiti	(Saudi Arabia) Al-Hazem	Free	
20 August 2024	DF	42	(Saudi Arabia) Fahad Al-Jayzani	(Saudi Arabia) Al-Batin	Free	
27 August 2024	DF	4	(Argentina) Lisandro López	(Spain) Burgos	Free	
12 September 2024	MF	47	(England) Mo Adams	(Saudi Arabia) Al-Batin	Free	
19 September 2024	MF	21	(Saudi Arabia) Hussain Al-Ohaymid	(Saudi Arabia) Al-Noor	Free	
1 January 2025	FW	77	(Saudi Arabia) Hisham Al Dubais	(Saudi Arabia) Al-Shabab	Free	
20 January 2025	MF	7	(Togo) Khaled Narey	(Saudi Arabia) Al-Ula	$2,133,000	
29 January 2025	MF	26	(Saudi Arabia) Malek Al-Darwish	(Saudi Arabia) Al-Gottah	Free	
1 February 2025	MF	99	(Saudi Arabia) Hamad Al-Abdan	(Saudi Arabia) Abha	Free	

=== Loans out ===
Start date	End date	Position	No.	Player	To club	Fee	Ref.
3 September 2024	End of season	DF	16	(Saudi Arabia) Mohammed Al-Khaibari	(Saudi Arabia) Damac	None	
31 January 2025	End of season	GK	96	(Saudi Arabia) Marwan Al-Haidari	(Saudi Arabia) Al-Ettifaq	None	

== Pre-season ==
24 July 2024 Friendly	Al-Khaleej (Saudi Arabia)	1–0	(Slovenia) Aluminij	Kidričevo, Slovenia
18:00 CEST	Al-Abdullah	Report		Stadium: Aluminij Sports Park

30 July 2024 Friendly	Al-Khaleej (Saudi Arabia)	7–1	(Slovenia) Bistrica	Slovenska Bistrica, Slovenia
17:30 CEST	Sherif 30', 45'; Martins 37', 45+4'; Narey 50'; Al Dubais 63', 71'	Report		Stadium: Slovenska Bistrica Sports Park

3 August 2024 Friendly	Al-Khaleej (Saudi Arabia)	2–1	(United Arab Emirates) Al Bataeh	Slovenia
17:30 CEST	Al-Khaibari 78'; Al Salem 85'	Report	Pereira

6 August 2024 Friendly	Al-Khaleej (Saudi Arabia)	2–2	(Saudi Arabia) Al-Fateh	Slovenia
17:30 CEST	Al-Fahad 25'; Al Dubais 73'	Report	Djaniny 47'; Batna 76'

12 August 2024 Friendly	Al-Khaleej (Saudi Arabia)	1–1	(Saudi Arabia) Al-Qadsiah	Khobar, Saudi Arabia
20:30 AST	Hawsawi 66'	Report	Aubameyang 48'	Stadium: Al-Qadsiah Club Stadium

== Competitions ==
=== Overview ===
Competition	Record							
Competition	Pld	W	D	L	GF	GA	GD	Win %
Pro League	34	10	7	17	40	57	−17	29.41
King Cup	1	0	0	1	2	5	−3	0.00
Total	35	10	7	18	42	62	−20	28.57

Updated to match played 26 May 2025
Source: Competitions

=== Pro League ===
==== League table ====
Pos	Team	Pld	W	D	L	GF	GA	GD	Pts
10	Al-Fateh	34	11	6	17	47	61	−14	39
11	Al-Riyadh	34	10	8	16	37	52	−15	38
12	Al-Khaleej	34	10	7	17	40	57	−17	37
13	Al-Fayha	34	8	12	14	27	49	−22	36
14	Damac	34	9	8	17	37	50	−13	35

Source: SPL
Rules for classification: 1) Points; 2) Head-to-head points; 3) Head-to-head goal difference; 4) Total goal difference; 5) Total goals scored; 6) Fair-play points
(Note: Head-to-head record is used only after all the matches between the teams in question have been played).

==== Results summary ====
Overall								Home						Away					
Pld	W	D	L	GF	GA	GD	Pts	W	D	L	GF	GA	GD	W	D	L	GF	GA	GD
34	10	7	17	40	57	−17	37	4	4	9	20	27	−7	6	3	8	20	30	−10

Last updated: 26 May 2025.
Source: Saudi Pro League

==== Results by round ====
Round	1	2	3	4	5	6	7	8	9	10	11	12	13	14	15	16	17	18	19	20	21	22	23	24	25	26	27	28	29	30	31	32	33	34
Ground	A	H	A	H	A	H	H	A	H	A	H	A	H	A	H	H	A	H	A	H	A	H	A	A	H	A	H	A	H	A	H	A	A	H
Result	W	L	L	D	L	W	L	W	W	W	W	L	L	D	W	L	W	D	L	L	D	D	L	D	L	W	L	L	D	L	L	W	L	L
Position	6	10	13	13	14	12	13	11	7	6	6	7	8	9	7	8	7	8	8	9	10	9	10	11	11	10	10	10	10	10	11	10	10	12

Updated to match(es) played on 26 May 2025. Source: Saudi Pro League
A = Away; H = Home; W = Win; D = Draw; L = Loss

==== Matches ====
All times are local, AST (UTC+3).

Win Draw Loss Postponed

23 August 2024 1	Damac	0–1	Al-Khaleej	Khamis Mushait
19:10	Nkoudou (yellow card) 20'; Al-Anazi (yellow card) 77'	Report	Al-Anazi 16' (o.g.); Al Hamsal (yellow card) 66'; Al Dubais (yellow card) 72'; Šehić (yellow card) 90+3'	Stadium: Damac Club Stadium; Attendance: 2,677; Referee: Abdullah Al-Kharboush

29 August 2024 2	Al-Khaleej	0–1	Al-Shabab	Dammam
21:00		Report	Al-Harbi (yellow card) 28'; Carrasco (yellow card) 56', (goal) 60'; Al-Sibyani (yellow card) 90+7'	Stadium: Prince Mohamed bin Fahd Stadium; Attendance: 1,347; Referee: Abdullah Al-Owaydan

13 September 2024 3	Al-Taawoun	2–0	Al-Khaleej	Buraidah
18:50	Barrow 18'; El Mahdioui (yellow card) 21'; Al-Mufarrij (yellow card) 43'; Al-Jumayah (yellow card) 45'; Flávio (yellow card) 45+5'; Mandash 51'; Girotto (yellow card) 53'	Report	Martins (yellow card) 27'; Kourbelis (yellow card) 45+1'; Al-Fahad (yellow card) 59'	Stadium: Al-Taawoun Club Stadium; Attendance: 2,380; Referee: Khaled Al-Teris

20 September 2024 4	Al-Khaleej	0–0	Al-Fayha	Dammam
18:15	Al-Samiri (yellow card) 45+6'	Report	López (yellow card) 22'; Abdi (yellow card) 85'; Shukurov (yellow card) 90+1'	Stadium: Prince Mohamed bin Fahd Stadium; Attendance: 1,073; Referee: Abdullah Al-Kharboush

27 September 2024 5	Al-Ittihad	4–1	Al-Khaleej	Jeddah
21:00	Kadesh (yellow card) 43'; Benzema 49'; Aouar (yellow card) 53', (goal) 56'; Bergwijn 68'; H. Al-Ghamdi 90+5'	Report	Narey 5'	Stadium: King Abdullah Sports City; Attendance: 27,483; Referee: Majed Al-Shamrani

4 October 2024 6	Al-Khaleej	1–0	Al-Kholood	Dammam
18:00	Al-Fahad (yellow card) 40'; Al Salem 66'	Report	Dieng (yellow card) 10'; Al-Safri (yellow card) 13'	Stadium: Prince Mohamed bin Fahd Stadium; Attendance: 1,189; Referee: Sami Al-Jires

18 October 2024 7	Al-Khaleej	0–3	Al-Ahli	Dammam
17:45	Al-Fahad (yellow card) 17'; Al-Samiri (red card) 53'; Fortounis (yellow card) 74'; Kourbelis (yellow card) 79'	Report	Mahrez (yellow card) 20'; Al-Buraikan 55'; Toney 70'; Demiral 74'; Majrashi (yellow card) 90+2'	Stadium: Prince Mohamed bin Fahd Stadium; Attendance: 7,193; Referee: Faisal Al-Blwi

24 October 2024 8	Al-Wehda	1–3	Al-Khaleej	Mecca
21:00	Amyn 45+1'; Al-Hejji (yellow card) 89'; Crețu (yellow card) 90+6'	Report	Fortounis 55' (pen.); Martins 59'; Narey 72'	Stadium: King Abdulaziz Sports City; Attendance: 1,067; Referee: Sultan Okairy

1 November 2024 9	Al-Khaleej	4–0	Al-Raed	Dammam
17:35	Al Salem 39', 75', (yellow card) 59'; Kourbelis 45+3', (yellow card) 45+5'; Al Hamsal (yellow card) 72'; Al Dubais 90+1'; Hawsawi (yellow card) 90+6'	Report	Al-Amri (yellow card) 45+5'	Stadium: Prince Mohamed bin Fahd Stadium; Attendance: 2,154; Referee: Mohammed Al-Daqqash

9 November 2024 10	Al-Fateh	1–2	Al-Khaleej	Al-Hasa
17:30	Baattiah (yellow card) 11'; Bendebka (yellow card) 31'; Batna (yellow card) 80', (goal) 90+9'	Report	Kourbelis (yellow card) 25'; Al-Khabrani (yellow card) 47'; Al Salem 55', 87'; Tisserand (yellow card) 72'; Al Hamsal (yellow card) 74'	Stadium: Al-Fateh Club Stadium; Attendance: 10,334; Referee: Faisal Al-Blwi

23 November 2024 11	Al-Khaleej	3–2	Al-Hilal	Dammam
20:00	Al-Khabrani (yellow card) 9'; Al Salem 45', 47'; Martins 85'; Narey (yellow card) 90'	Report	Leonardo 12'; Mitrović 37'	Stadium: Prince Mohamed bin Fahd Stadium; Attendance: 17,150; Referee: Andris Treimanis (Latvia)

29 November 2024 12	Al-Qadsiah	1–0	Al-Khaleej	Dammam
17:25	Álvarez (yellow card) 90+2'; Al-Othman 90+5'	Report		Stadium: Prince Mohamed bin Fahd Stadium; Attendance: 11,234; Referee: Matthew Conger (New Zealand)

7 December 2024 13	Al-Khaleej	1–2	Al-Ettifaq	Dammam
15:55	Narey 35'; Kourbelis (yellow card) 39'; Al Hamsal (yellow card) 66'	Report	Wijnaldum 45+6'; Toko Ekambi (yellow card) 61'; Radif 83'; Abdulrahman (yellow card) 90+4'	Stadium: Prince Mohamed bin Fahd Stadium; Attendance: 4,231; Referee: Khaled Al-Teris

9 January 2025 14	Al-Riyadh	2–2	Al-Khaleej	Riyadh
18:00	Tozé 68'; Barbet 90+2'	Report	Hawsawi (yellow card) 34'; Fortounis 45'; Martins 80'	Stadium: Prince Faisal bin Fahd Sports City Stadium; Attendance: 315; Referee: Shukri Al-Hanfoush

17 January 2025 15	Al-Khaleej	3–0	Al-Orobah	Dammam
16:15	Martins (yellow card) 9', (goal) 32'; Al Salem 22'; Hamzi (yellow card) 37'; Fortounis (yellow card) 70'; Sherif 90+5'	Report	Tello (yellow card) 15'; Al-Shammeri (red card) 89'; Young (yellow card) 90+4'	Stadium: Prince Mohamed bin Fahd Stadium; Attendance: 2,314; Referee: Abdulsamad Bakri

21 January 2025 16	Al-Khaleej	1–3	Al-Nassr	Dammam
17:50	Aboulshamat (yellow card) 23'; Al Hamsal (red card) 34'; Hawsawi (yellow card) 64'; Fortounis 80' (pen.); Martins (yellow card) 82'; Rebocho (yellow card) 90+6'	Report	Boushal (yellow card) 45+5'; Ronaldo 65', 90+8'; Al-Najdi (yellow card) 76'; Al-Ghannam 81'; Simakan (yellow card) 84'; Al-Khaibari (yellow card) 90+5'	Stadium: Prince Mohamed bin Fahd Stadium; Attendance: 13,432; Referee: Anastasios Sidiropoulos (Greece)

26 January 2025 17	Al-Okhdood	1–2	Al-Khaleej	Najran
18:30	Khamis (yellow card) 83'; Al-Samiri 90+5' (o.g.); Petros (yellow card) 90+6'; Al-Harthi (yellow card) 90+7'	Report	Martins (yellow card) 45+3'; Aboulshamat 66'; Sherif 69'; Al-Samiri (yellow card) 90+1'	Stadium: Prince Hathloul bin Abdulaziz Sports City; Attendance: 1,244; Referee: Sultan Al-Harbi

1 February 2025 18	Al-Khaleej	1–1	Damac	Dammam
16:25	Murg 43'; Al-Abdullah (yellow card) 90'	Report	Nkoudou 25'; Stanciu (yellow card) 45+3'; Chafaï (yellow card) 50'; Al-Khaibari (yellow card) 79'; H. Al-Ghamdi (yellow card) 90+6'	Stadium: Prince Mohamed bin Fahd Stadium; Attendance: 1,317; Referee: Abdullah Al-Kharbosh

6 February 2025 19	Al-Shabab	5–1	Al-Khaleej	Riyadh
18:20	Hoedt 25', 90+3'; Harboush (yellow card) 37'; Hamdallah 63', 77', 89'	Report	Al Salem 45', (yellow card) 90+1'; Martins (yellow card) 49'	Stadium: Al-Shabab Club Stadium; Attendance: 3,210; Referee: Abdullah Al-Shehri

15 February 2025 20	Al-Khaleej	0–1	Al-Taawoun	Dammam
16:35	Martins (yellow card) 59'	Report	Sabiri (yellow card) 36', (goal) 90+5'; Al-Ahmed (yellow card) 38'; Mahzari (yellow card) 45+1'	Stadium: Prince Mohamed bin Fahd Stadium; Attendance: 1,490; Referee: Mohammed Abu Shaqarah

20 February 2025 21	Al-Fayha	0–0	Al-Khaleej	Al Majma'ah
18:30	Abdi (yellow card) 24'; Sakala (yellow card) 40'	Report	Tisserand (yellow card) 42'	Stadium: Al Majma'ah Sports City; Attendance: 1,606; Referee: Shukri Al-Hanfoush

26 February 2025 22	Al-Khaleej	1–1	Al-Ittihad	Dammam
20:00	Al Hamsal (yellow card) 45+2'; Al-Samiri (yellow card) 89'; Fortounis 90+6' (pen.)	Report	Al-Aboud 78'	Stadium: Prince Mohamed bin Fahd Stadium; Attendance: 17,150; Referee: Andris Treimanis (Latvia)

1 March 2025 23	Al-Kholood	2–1	Al-Khaleej	Ar Rass
22:00	Muleka 16' (pen.); Maolida 42' (pen.); Al-Safri (yellow card) 67'; N'Doram (yellow card) 85'	Report	Sherif 8'; Tisserand (yellow card) 14'; Murg (yellow card) 41'; Al-Samiri (yellow card) 90'; Aboulshamat (yellow card) 90+2'	Stadium: Al-Hazem Club Stadium; Attendance: 2,806; Referee: Khaled Al-Ahmari

7 March 2025 24	Al-Ahli	2–2	Al-Khaleej	Jeddah
22:00	Al Hamsal 30' (o.g.); Veiga (yellow card) 48'; Demiral (yellow card) 68'; Toney (yellow card) 82'; Galeno 90'	Report	Aboulshamat (yellow card) 45'; Al Salem 45+2'; Martins 45+9'; Hamzi (yellow card) 61'	Stadium: Prince Abdullah Al-Faisal Sports City; Attendance: 13,147; Referee: Cláudio Pereira (Portugal)

14 March 2025 25	Al-Khaleej	0–2	Al-Wehda	Dammam
22:00	Al-Khabrani (yellow card) 61'	Report	Bacuna 2', (yellow card) 74'; Bakshween (yellow card) 33'; Al-Salem (yellow card) 48'; Amyn 63'; Al-Hejji (yellow card) 83'	Stadium: Prince Mohamed bin Fahd Stadium; Attendance: 2,311; Referee: Mohammed Al-Harbi

6 April 2025 26	Al-Raed	1–2	Al-Khaleej	Buraidah
19:00	El Berkaoui 27'; Al-Amri (yellow card) 34'	Report	Hawsawi (yellow card) 53', (goal) 71'; Al-Khabrani (yellow card) 61'; Fortounis (yellow card) 77', (goal) 90+7'; Aboulshamat (yellow card) 90+10'	Stadium: Al-Raed Club Stadium; Attendance: 2,041; Referee: Khalid Al-Turais

12 April 2025 27	Al-Khaleej	1–5	Al-Fateh	Dammam
18:35	Kourbelis 4'; Al Hamsal (yellow card) 50'	Report	Vargas 44', 71'; Batna 47'; Sbaï 52'; Bendebka 65' (pen.); Al-Zarie (yellow card) 80'; Qassem (yellow card) 87'	Stadium: Prince Mohamed bin Fahd Stadium; Attendance: 1,924; Referee: Abdullah Al-Harbi

17 April 2025 28	Al-Hilal	3–0	Al-Khaleej	Riyadh
18:50	S. Al-Dawsari 26', 84'; Milinković-Savić (yellow card) 37'; Al-Shahrani (yellow card) 49'; Mitrović 88'	Report	Al Hamsal (yellow card) 57'	Stadium: Kingdom Arena; Attendance: 13,638; Referee: Serdar Gözübüyük (Netherlands)

23 April 2025 29	Al-Khaleej	1–1	Al-Qadsiah	Dammam
21:00	Martins 45+3', (yellow card) 46'; Rebocho (yellow card) 67'; Nasser (yellow card) 82'; Aboulshamat (yellow card) 89'	Report	Al-Othman (yellow card) 67'; Quiñones 89'; Puertas (yellow card) 90+4'	Stadium: Prince Mohamed bin Fahd Stadium; Attendance: 2,084; Referee: István Kovács (Romania)

2 May 2025 30	Al-Ettifaq	2–1	Al-Khaleej	Dammam
18:50	Wijnaldum 15' (pen.), 54'; Medrán (yellow card) 38'; Al-Otaibi (yellow card) 90+7'	Report	Hawsawi (yellow card) 36'; Hamzi 38'; Rebocho (yellow card) 44'	Stadium: EGO Stadium; Attendance: 6,857; Referee: Abdullah Al-Shehri

10 May 2025 31	Al-Khaleej	1–2	Al-Riyadh	Dammam
21:00	Martins 6', (yellow card) 9'; Al Salem (yellow card) 17'; Hawsawi (yellow card) 58'; Aboulshamat (yellow card) 90+12'	Report	Al-Khaibari (yellow card) 23'; Selemani 90+3'; Kal 90+14'	Stadium: Prince Mohamed bin Fahd Stadium; Attendance: 1,144; Referee: Sami Al-Jires

16 May 2025 32	Al-Orobah	1–2	Al-Khaleej	Sakakah
19:40	Kandouss 2'; Al-Khalaf (yellow card) 45+1'; Al-Maqati (yellow card) 49'; F. Al-Zubaidi (yellow card) 90'; Al-Torais (yellow card) 90+7'	Report	Fortounis 31' (pen.), 75', (yellow card) 87'; Al Hamsal (yellow card) 53'; Kourbelis (yellow card) 90+5'; Ozaybi (yellow card) 90+7'	Stadium: Al Jouf University Stadium; Attendance: 721; Referee: Faisal Al-Blwi

21 May 2025 33	Al-Nassr	2–0	Al-Khaleej	Riyadh
19:10	Durán 75'; Brozović (yellow card) 90+2'; Ronaldo 90+7' (pen.)	Report	Aboulshamat (yellow card) 90+2'; Ozaybi (yellow card) 90+5'	Stadium: Al-Awwal Park; Attendance: 5,889; Referee: Daniel Siebert (Germany)

26 May 2025 34	Al-Khaleej	2–3	Al-Okhdood	Dammam
21:00	Fortounis 47', 60'; Kourbelis (yellow card) 53'; Al-Samiri (yellow card) 90+4'	Report	Al-Qaydhi 65'; Al-Zabdani (yellow card) 88'; Al Abbas 90+5'; Al Jahif 90+15' (pen.), (yellow card) 90+15'; Al-Zubaidi (yellow card) 90+17'	Stadium: Prince Mohamed bin Fahd Stadium; Attendance: 1,086; Referee: Khalid Al-Turais

=== King Cup ===
All times are local, AST (UTC+3).

23 September 2024 Round of 32	Al-Tai	5–2 (a.e.t.)	Al-Khaleej	Ha'il
18:45	Al Salem 45' (o.g.); Cordea (yellow card) 45+4'; Al-Nakhli 49', (yellow card) 85'; Tawamba (yellow card) 73', (goal) 120'; Qassem (yellow card) 90+10'; Tandia 99'; Al-Faraj 103'	Report	Al Salem 55'; Šehić (red card) 58'; Al-Haidari (yellow card) 88'; Fortounis 90+2' (pen.)	Stadium: Prince Abdulaziz bin Musa'ed Sports City; Referee: Turki Hashlan

== Statistics ==
=== Appearances ===
Last updated on 26 May 2025.

No.	Pos	Nat	Player	Total		Pro League		King Cup	
No.	Pos	Nat	Player	Apps	Goals	Apps	Goals	Apps	Goals
Goalkeepers
22	GK	(Saudi Arabia) KSA	Raed Ozaybi	9	0	9	0	0	0
23	GK	(Bosnia and Herzegovina) BIH	Ibrahim Šehić	25	0	24	0	1	0
31	GK	(Saudi Arabia) KSA	Mohammed Al-Ghanem	0	0	0	0	0	0
35	GK	(Saudi Arabia) KSA	Rayan Al-Dossari	0	0	0	0	0	0
Defenders
3	DF	(Saudi Arabia) KSA	Mohammed Al-Khabrani	29	0	28+1	0	0	0
5	DF	(Portugal) POR	Pedro Rebocho	34	0	33	0	0+1	0
14	DF	(Saudi Arabia) KSA	Ali Al-Shaafi	13	0	4+9	0	0	0
20	DF	(Saudi Arabia) KSA	Abdullah Al-Fahad	23	0	15+7	0	1	0
25	DF	(Saudi Arabia) KSA	Arif Al Haydar	5	0	0+4	0	1	0
32	DF	(Democratic Republic of the Congo) COD	Marcel Tisserand	22	0	21	0	1	0
33	DF	(Saudi Arabia) KSA	Bander Nasser	16	0	1+14	0	1	0
39	DF	(Saudi Arabia) KSA	Saeed Al Hamsal	30	0	28+1	0	0+1	0
66	DF	(Saudi Arabia) KSA	Theyab Absa	0	0	0	0	0	0
Midfielders
8	MF	(Saudi Arabia) KSA	Khaled Al-Samiri	27	0	13+13	0	1	0
10	MF	(Portugal) POR	Fábio Martins	33	7	31+1	7	1	0
15	MF	(Saudi Arabia) KSA	Mansour Hamzi	35	1	33+1	1	1	0
17	MF	(Greece) GRE	Kostas Fortounis	31	10	29+1	9	0+1	1
18	MF	(Saudi Arabia) KSA	Murad Hawsawi	32	1	16+15	1	1	0
19	MF	(Saudi Arabia) KSA	Mohammed Al-Abdullah	6	0	0+6	0	0	0
21	MF	(Greece) GRE	Dimitrios Kourbelis	21	2	17+3	2	0+1	0
43	MF	(Saudi Arabia) KSA	Hassan Al-Musallam	1	0	0+1	0	0	0
47	MF	(Saudi Arabia) KSA	Saleh Aboulshamat	31	1	12+18	1	1	0
99	MF	(Austria) AUT	Thomas Murg	16	1	13+3	1	0	0
Forwards
9	FW	(Egypt) EGY	Mohamed Sherif	23	3	4+19	3	0	0
11	FW	(Saudi Arabia) KSA	Abdullah Al-Salem	34	11	28+5	10	1	1
24	FW	(Saudi Arabia) KSA	Ali Abdulraouf	2	0	0+2	0	0	0
48	FW	(The Gambia) GAM	Babucarr Seye	1	0	0+1	0	0	0
70	FW	(Saudi Arabia) KSA	Abdulmajeed Al-Khathami	0	0	0	0	0	0
71	FW	(Saudi Arabia) KSA	Hussain Al-Sultan	4	0	0+4	0	0	0
Players sent out on loan this season
16	DF	(Saudi Arabia) KSA	Mohammed Al-Khaibari	0	0	0	0	0	0
96	GK	(Saudi Arabia) KSA	Marwan Al-Haidari	2	0	1	0	0+1	0
Player who made an appearance this season but left the club
7	MF	(Togo) TOG	Khaled Narey	14	3	13	3	0+1	0
77	FW	(Saudi Arabia) KSA	Hisham Al Dubais	9	1	1+8	1	0	0

=== Goalscorers ===
Rank	No.	Pos	Nat	Name	Pro League	King Cup	Total
1	11	FW	(Saudi Arabia)	Abdullah Al-Salem	10	1	11
2	17	MF	(Greece)	Kostas Fortounis	9	1	10
3	10	MF	(Portugal)	Fábio Martins	7	0	7
4	7	MF	(Togo)	Khaled Narey	3	0	3
4	9	FW	(Egypt)	Mohamed Sherif	3	0	3
6	21	MF	(Greece)	Dimitrios Kourbelis	2	0	2
7	15	MF	(Saudi Arabia)	Mansour Hamzi	1	0	1
7	18	MF	(Saudi Arabia)	Murad Hawsawi	1	0	1
7	47	MF	(Saudi Arabia)	Saleh Aboulshamat	1	0	1
7	77	FW	(Saudi Arabia)	Hisham Al Dubais	1	0	1
7	99	MF	(Austria)	Thomas Murg	1	0	1
Own goal					1	0	1
Total					40	2	42

Last Updated: 26 May 2025

=== Assists ===
Rank	No.	Pos	Nat	Name	Pro League	King Cup	Total
1	5	DF	(Portugal)	Pedro Rebocho	7	0	7
2	47	MF	(Saudi Arabia)	Saleh Aboulshamat	6	0	6
3	17	MF	(Greece)	Kostas Fortounis	5	0	5
4	11	FW	(Saudi Arabia)	Abdullah Al-Salem	4	0	4
5	7	MF	(Togo)	Khaled Narey	3	0	3
6	15	MF	(Saudi Arabia)	Mansour Hamzi	1	1	2
7	8	MF	(Saudi Arabia)	Khaled Al-Samiri	1	0	1
7	10	MF	(Portugal)	Fábio Martins	1	0	1
7	19	MF	(Saudi Arabia)	Mohammed Al-Abdullah	1	0	1
7	21	MF	(Greece)	Dimitrios Kourbelis	1	0	1
Total					30	1	31

Last Updated: 26 May 2025

=== Clean sheets ===
Rank	No.	Pos	Nat	Name	Pro League	King Cup	Total
1	23	GK	(Bosnia and Herzegovina)	Ibrahim Šehić	6	0	6
Total					6	0	6

Last Updated: 20 February 2025
