= 2023–24 Al-Khaleej FC season =

Al-Khaleej
2023–24 season
- President: Alaa Al-Heml
- Manager: Pedro Emanuel
- Stadium: Prince Mohamed bin Fahd Stadium
- SPL: 11th
- King Cup: Semi-finals (knocked out by Al-Nassr)
- Top goalscorer: League: Khaled Narey; Fábio Martins (7 goals each); All: Khaled Narey; Fábio Martins (8 goals each)
- Highest home attendance: 17,300 v Al-Nassr; 27 April 2024; Saudi Pro League
- Lowest home attendance: 1,096 v Damac; 30 October 2023; King Cup
- Average home league attendance: 5,356
- All statistics correct as of 27 May 2024.

The 2023–24 season was Al-Khaleej's 79th year in existence and their 9th non-consecutive season in the Pro League. The club participated in the Pro League, and the King Cup.

The season covers the period from 1 July 2023 to 30 June 2024.

== Players ==
=== Squad information ===
As of 1 February 2024

Note: Flags indicate national team as defined under FIFA eligibility rules; some limited exceptions apply. Players may hold more than one non-FIFA nationality.

No.	Pos.	Nation	Player
2	DF	KSA	Omar Al-Owdah
3	DF	KSA	Mohammed Al-Khabrani
4	DF	ARG	Lisandro López
5	DF	POR	Pedro Rebocho
6	MF	KSA	Khaled Al-Samiri
7	MF	TOG	Khaled Narey
8	MF	POR	Ivo Rodrigues
9	FW	EGY	Mohamed Sherif
10	MF	POR	Fábio Martins (captain)
11	FW	KSA	Abdullah Al-Salem
13	DF	KSA	Abdullah Al-Shanqiti
14	DF	KSA	Ali Al-Shaafi
15	MF	KSA	Mansour Hamzi
18	MF	KSA	Abdulelah Hawsawi (on loan from Al-Ittihad)

No.	Pos.	Nation	Player
19	MF	KSA	Mohammed Al-Abdullah
22	GK	KSA	Raed Ozaybi
23	GK	BIH	Ibrahim Šehić
25	DF	KSA	Arif Al Haydar
27	MF	KSA	Fawaz Al-Torais
33	DF	KSA	Bander Nasser
35	GK	KSA	Rayan Al-Dossari
39	DF	KSA	Saeed Al Hamsal
47	MF	ENG	Mo Adams
55	MF	KOR	Jung Woo-young
66	DF	KSA	Hussain Furayj
88	MF	KSA	Naif Masoud (on loan from Al-Qadsiah)
96	GK	KSA	Marwan Al-Haidari
99	MF	KSA	Hamad Al-Abdan

=== Out on loan ===
Note: Flags indicate national team as defined under FIFA eligibility rules; some limited exceptions apply. Players may hold more than one non-FIFA nationality.

No.	Pos.	Nation	Player
16	DF	KSA	Mohammed Al-Khaibari (at Al-Najma until 30 June 2024)
17	MF	KSA	Hassan Al-Majhad (at Al-Adalah until 30 June 2024)

No.	Pos.	Nation	Player
21	MF	KSA	Hussain Al-Ohaymid (at Al-Noor until 30 June 2024)
77	FW	KSA	Hisham Al Dubais (at Al-Jabalain until 30 June 2024)

== Transfers and loans ==
=== Transfers in ===
Entry date	Position	No.	Player	From club	Fee	Ref.
30 June 2023	DF	14	(Saudi Arabia) Ali Al-Shaafi	(Saudi Arabia) Al-Qaisumah	End of loan	
30 June 2023	MF	21	(Saudi Arabia) Hussain Al-Ohaymid	(Saudi Arabia) Al-Safa	End of loan	
30 June 2023	MF	26	(Saudi Arabia) Malek Al-Darwish	(Saudi Arabia) Al-Bukiryah	End of loan	
30 June 2023	FW	77	(Saudi Arabia) Hisham Al Dubais	(Saudi Arabia) Al-Sahel	End of loan	
1 July 2023	DF	5	(Portugal) Pedro Rebocho	(Poland) Lech Poznań	Free	
1 July 2023	DF	33	(Saudi Arabia) Bander Nasser	(Saudi Arabia) Al-Fayha	Free	
1 July 2023	DF	39	(Saudi Arabia) Saeed Al Hamsal	(Saudi Arabia) Abha	Free	
1 July 2023	MF	8	(Portugal) Ivo Rodrigues	(Portugal) Famalicão	Free	
1 July 2023	MF	99	(Saudi Arabia) Hamad Al-Abdan	(Saudi Arabia) Al-Hilal	Free	
1 July 2023	FW	11	(Saudi Arabia) Abdullah Al-Salem	(Saudi Arabia) Al-Ettifaq	Free	
6 July 2023	DF	4	(Argentina) Lisandro López	(Mexico) Tijuana	Free	
9 July 2023	MF	6	(Saudi Arabia) Khaled Al-Samiri	(Saudi Arabia) Al-Ittihad	Free	
18 July 2023	MF	27	(Saudi Arabia) Fawaz Al-Torais	(Saudi Arabia) Al-Hilal	Free	
20 July 2023	MF	55	(South Korea) Jung Woo-young	(Qatar) Al-Sadd	Free	
1 August 2023	GK	23	(Bosnia and Herzegovina) Ibrahim Šehić	(Turkey) Konyaspor	$988,000	
4 August 2023	MF	15	(Saudi Arabia) Mansour Hamzi	(Saudi Arabia) Damac	Free	
6 August 2023	GK	22	(Saudi Arabia) Raed Azybi	(Saudi Arabia) Al-Nassr	Free	
14 August 2023	FW	9	(Egypt) Mohamed Sherif	(Egypt) Al Ahly	$1,500,000	
28 August 2023	FW	7	(Togo) Khaled Narey	(Greece) PAOK	$2,160,000	
31 August 2023	DF	25	(Saudi Arabia) Arif Al Haydar	(Saudi Arabia) Al-Adalah	Free	
5 September 2023	DF	16	(Saudi Arabia) Mohammed Al-Khaibari	(Saudi Arabia) Al-Hilal	Free	
10 January 2024	FW	–	(Saudi Arabia) Rayan Fallatah	(Greece) OFI Crete	Free	

=== Loans in ===
Start date	End date	Position	No.	Player	From club	Fee	Ref.
2 July 2023	End of season	MF	18	(Saudi Arabia) Abdulelah Hawsawi	(Saudi Arabia) Al-Ittihad	None	
31 January 2024	End of season	MF	88	(Saudi Arabia) Naif Masoud	(Saudi Arabia) Al-Qadsiah	None	

=== Transfers out ===
Exit date	Position	No.	Player	To club	Fee	Ref.
30 June 2023	GK	12	(Saudi Arabia) Taher Al-Hajji	(Saudi Arabia) Al-Faisaly	End of loan	
30 June 2023	DF	24	(Saudi Arabia) Hani Al-Sebyani	(Saudi Arabia) Al-Ahli	End of loan	
30 June 2023	MF	6	(Saudi Arabia) Khaled Al-Samiri	(Saudi Arabia) Al-Ittihad	End of loan	
30 June 2023	MF	49	(Saudi Arabia) Ahmed Al-Zain	(Saudi Arabia) Damac	End of loan	
30 June 2023	MF	99	(Saudi Arabia) Hamad Al-Abdan	(Saudi Arabia) Al-Hilal	End of loan	
30 June 2023	FW	9	(Albania) Sokol Cikalleshi	(Turkey) Konyaspor	End of loan	
30 June 2023	FW	14	(Saudi Arabia) Saleh Al Abbas	(Saudi Arabia) Al-Faisaly	End of loan	
1 July 2023	DF	20	(Saudi Arabia) Abdullah Al-Harbi	(Saudi Arabia) Al-Kholood	Free	
1 July 2023	DF	27	(Saudi Arabia) Hussain Al-Nowaiqi	(Saudi Arabia) Al-Riyadh	Free	
22 July 2023	MF	55	(Saudi Arabia) Mohammed Al-Musabbeh	(Saudi Arabia) Al-Noor	Free	
23 July 2023	GK	1	(Brazil) Douglas Friedrich	(Brazil) Avaí	Free	
25 July 2023	MF	58	(Saudi Arabia) Ayman Al-Hujaili	(Saudi Arabia) Al-Faisaly	Free	
26 July 2023	MF	8	(Brazil) Lucas Souza	(Saudi Arabia) Al-Faisaly	Free	
26 July 2023	MF	10	(Brazil) Morato	(Saudi Arabia) Al-Faisaly	Free	
29 July 2023	MF	11	(Saudi Arabia) Mohammed Al-Sahli	(Saudi Arabia) Al-Batin	Free	
29 July 2023	MF	48	(Saudi Arabia) Abdullah Al-Samti	(Saudi Arabia) Al-Batin	Free	
29 August 2023	MF	15	(Gabon) André Biyogo Poko	(Israel) Hapoel Be'er Sheva	Free	
26 September 2023	DF	5	(Portugal) Pedro Amaral	(Greece) Lamia	Free	
15 October 2023	DF	25	(Nigeria) Izuchuckwu Anthony	(Serbia) Radnički Kragujevac	Free	
20 January 2024	MF	70	(Saudi Arabia) Riyadh Al-Ibrahim	(Saudi Arabia) Al-Kholood	Free	

=== Loans out ===
Start date	End date	Position	No.	Player	To club	Fee	Ref.
22 July 2023	End of season	MF	21	(Saudi Arabia) Hussain Al-Ohaymid	(Saudi Arabia) Al-Noor	None	
5 September 2023	End of season	FW	77	(Saudi Arabia) Hisham Al Dubais	(Saudi Arabia) Al-Jabalain	None	
18 January 2024	End of season	DF	16	(Saudi Arabia) Mohammed Al-Khaibari	(Saudi Arabia) Al-Najma	None	
26 January 2024	End of season	MF	17	(Saudi Arabia) Hassan Al-Majhad	(Saudi Arabia) Al-Adalah	None	

== Pre-season ==
19 July 2023 Friendly	Al-Khaleej (Saudi Arabia)	0–0	(Iran) Nassaji	Kartepe, Turkey
17:30 TRT		Report		Stadium: The Green Park Kartepe Resort

22 July 2023 Friendly	Al-Khaleej (Saudi Arabia)	2–1	(Saudi Arabia) Abha	İzmit, Turkey
17:30 TRT	Martins; Rebocho	Report		Stadium: Edis Spor Tesisleri

27 July 2023 Friendly	Al-Khaleej (Saudi Arabia)	4–0	(Saudi Arabia) Al-Raed	Kartepe, Turkey
18:00 TRT	Jung Woo-young; López; Al-Majhad; Rodrigues	Report		Stadium: The Green Park Kartepe Resort

2 August 2023 Friendly	Al-Khaleej (Saudi Arabia)	2–1	(Kuwait) Kazma	Kartepe, Turkey
18:00 TRT	Al-Ibrahim (pen.); Martins	Report	Al-Khaldi (pen.)	Stadium: The Green Park Kartepe Resort

3 August 2023 Friendly	Al-Khaleej (Saudi Arabia)	3–1	(Qatar) Umm Salal	Kartepe, Turkey
18:00 TRT	Martins; López; Al-Samiri	Report	Khaled	Stadium: The Green Park Kartepe Resort

== Competitions ==
=== Overview ===
Competition	Record							
Competition	G	W	D	L	GF	GA	GD	Win %
Pro League	34	9	10	15	36	47	−11	26.47
King Cup	4	2	1	1	6	5	+1	50.00
Total	38	11	11	16	42	52	−10	28.95

Updated to match played 27 May 2024
Source: Competitions

=== Pro League ===
==== League table ====
Pos	Team	Pld	W	D	L	GF	GA	GD	Pts
9	Al-Fayha	34	11	11	12	44	52	−8	44 (Note: Al-Shabab finished ahead of Al-Fayha on overall goal difference: Al-Shabab +3, Al-Fayha −8 (Al-Fayha 0–1 Al-Shabab, Al-Shabab 2–3 Al-Fayha).)
10	Damac	34	10	11	13	44	45	−1	41
11	Al-Khaleej	34	9	10	15	36	47	−11	37 (Note: Al-Khaleej finished ahead of Al-Raed on head-to-head points: Al-Khaleej: 4 pts, Al-Raed: 1 pts (Al-Khaleej 0–0 Al-Raed, Al-Raed 0–1 Al-Khaleej).)
12	Al-Raed	34	9	10	15	41	49	−8	37
13	Al-Wehda	34	10	6	18	45	60	−15	36

Source: SPL
Rules for classification: 1) Points; 2) Head-to-head points; 3) Head-to-head goal difference; 4) Total goal difference; 5) Total goals scored; 6) Fair-play points
(Note: Head-to-head record is used only after all the matches between the teams in question have been played).

==== Results summary ====
Overall								Home						Away					
Pld	W	D	L	GF	GA	GD	Pts	W	D	L	GF	GA	GD	W	D	L	GF	GA	GD
34	9	10	15	36	47	−11	37	3	6	8	19	26	−7	6	4	7	17	21	−4

Last updated: 27 May 2024.
Source: spl.com.sa

==== Results by round ====
Round	1	2	3	4	5	6	7	8	9	10	11	12	13	14	15	16	17	18	19	20	21	22	23	24	25	26	27	28	29	30	31	32	33	34
Ground	A	H	A	H	A	H	A	H	H	A	H	A	H	A	A	H	A	H	A	H	A	H	A	H	A	A	H	A	H	A	H	H	A	H
Result	L	L	D	D	W	L	W	L	D	L	D	L	W	L	L	W	W	W	L	L	D	D	W	D	W	W	L	D	L	D	L	D	L	L
Position	16	16	16	15	12	12	10	10	11	13	13	15	12	14	14	13	10	10	10	12	12	12	11	11	10	9	10	10	11	11	11	11	11	11

Updated to match(es) played on 27 May 2024. Source: spl.com.sa
A = Away; H = Home; W = Win; D = Draw; L = Loss

==== Matches ====
All times are local, AST (UTC+3).

Win Draw Loss Postponed

12 August 2023 1	Al-Fayha	3–1	Al-Khaleej	Al Majma'ah
21:00	Ryller 13'; Al-Safri (yellow card) 23'; Cimirot (yellow card) 29'; Sakala 45+7'; Ruiz (yellow card) 49'; Mandash 76' (pen.)	Report	Al-Samiri (yellow card) 15'; Al Dubais 87'	Stadium: Al Majma'ah Sports City; Attendance: 1,518; Referee: Faisal Al-Blwi

17 August 2023 2	Al-Khaleej	1–3	Al-Ahli	Dammam
21:00	Jung Woo-young (yellow card) 6'; Rodrigues (yellow card) 53'; Hamzi 58'	Report	Ibañez 9', (yellow card) 70'; Mahrez 45+1'; Al-Majhad (yellow card) 72'; Al-Ali (yellow card) 90+6'; Al-Nabit 90+11'	Stadium: Prince Mohamed bin Fahd Stadium; Attendance: 14,550; Referee: Majed Al-Shamrani

24 August 2023 3	Al-Ettifaq	1–1	Al-Khaleej	Dammam
21:00	Hendry (yellow card) 39'; Henderson (yellow card) 45+5'; Vitinho 50'; A. Hazazi (yellow card) 79'	Report	Rodrigues (yellow card) 19'; Martins 29'	Stadium: Prince Mohamed bin Fahd Stadium; Attendance: 4,200; Referee: Ahmed Al-Rumaikhani

29 August 2023 4	Al-Khaleej	1–1	Al-Hazem	Dammam
21:00	Al-Khabrani (yellow card) 13'; Martins 22'; Šehić (yellow card) 62'	Report	Traoré (yellow card) 19'; Vina (yellow card) 36', (goal) 61' (pen.); Al-Aazmi (yellow card) 78'; Al Mohaimed (yellow card) 90+10'	Stadium: Prince Mohamed bin Fahd Stadium; Attendance: 1,889; Referee: Sami Al-Jires

2 September 2023 5	Al-Shabab	1–3	Al-Khaleej	Riyadh
21:00	Diallo 20'; Cuéllar (yellow card) 54'; Santos (yellow card) 61'; F. Al-Muwallad (yellow card) 67'; Harboush (yellow card) 90+4'	Report	Hamzi 39'; Hawsawi (red card) 56'; Al-Khabrani (yellow card) 59'; Martins 68'; Narey (yellow card) 80'; Sherif 81'	Stadium: Prince Faisal bin Fahd Stadium; Attendance: 987; Referee: Mohammed Al-Hoaish

15 September 2023 6	Al-Khaleej	1–3	Al-Fateh	Dammam
21:00	Rebocho (yellow card) 42'; Martins 82'	Report	Batna 10', 13'; Ali (yellow card) 58' (yellow-red card) 81'; Bendebka 66'	Stadium: Prince Mohamed bin Fahd Stadium; Attendance: 2,276; Referee: Mohammed Al-Beredi

22 September 2023 7	Al-Okhdood	0–1	Al-Khaleej	Najran
18:00	Al-Harthi (yellow card) 83'; Tănase (yellow card) 90'	Report	Jung Woo-young (yellow card) 57'; Narey 60' (pen.); Al-Samiri (yellow card) 79'; Šehić (yellow card) 86'	Stadium: Prince Hathloul bin Abdul Aziz Sports City; Attendance: 887; Referee: Mohammed Al-Harbi

30 September 2023 8	Al-Khaleej	0–2	Damac	Dammam
21:00	Hamzi (yellow card) 24'; Rodrigues (yellow card) 64'; Martins (yellow card) 90+1'; Al Salem (yellow card) 90+6'	Report	Antolić (yellow card) 14'; Chafaï 43'; Nkoudou 56'	Stadium: Prince Mohamed bin Fahd Stadium; Attendance: 1,881; Referee: Mohammed Al-Hoaish

7 October 2023 9	Al-Khaleej	0–0	Al-Raed	Dammam
21:00	Rodrigues (yellow card) 48'; Sherif (yellow card) 90'	Report	El Berkaoui (yellow card) 66'; Al-Subaie (yellow card) 83'; Gonzalez (yellow card) 90+1'; Normann (yellow card) 90+3'	Stadium: Prince Mohamed bin Fahd Stadium; Attendance: 2,053; Referee: Khaled Al-Teris

20 October 2023 10	Al-Hilal	1–0	Al-Khaleej	Riyadh
21:00	Mitrović 30'; Abdulhamid (yellow card) 35'; Neves (yellow card) 47'	Report	Jung Woo-young (yellow card) 23'; Martins (yellow card) 70'	Stadium: Prince Faisal bin Fahd Stadium; Attendance: 8,505; Referee: Darío Herrera (Argentina)

26 October 2023 11	Al-Khaleej	1–1	Al-Taawoun	Dammam
18:00	López 35', (yellow card) 78'; Narey (yellow card) 42'	Report	Al-Oyayari (yellow card) 12'; Flávio (yellow card) 30'; Pedro 37'; Faqeehi (yellow card) 90+6'	Stadium: Prince Mohamed bin Fahd Stadium; Attendance: 1,992; Referee: Mamdouh Al Shahdan

4 November 2023 12	Al-Nassr	2–0	Al-Khaleej	Riyadh
21:00	Ronaldo 26'; Laporte 58'; Ghareeb (yellow card) 79'	Report	Martins (yellow card) 19'; Al Hamsal (yellow card) 21'	Stadium: Al-Awwal Park; Attendance: 17,121; Referee: Guillermo Guerrero (Ecuador)

9 November 2023 13	Al-Khaleej	3–1	Al-Tai	Khobar
18:00	Narey (yellow card) 8' (yellow-red card) 45+12', (goal) 45+1' (pen.); Hamzi (yellow card) 45+3'; Rodrigues (yellow card) 52'; Martins 61'; Sherif 73'	Report	Bauer (yellow card) 2'; Al-Qumairi (red card) 27'; Mensah 29'; Braga (yellow card) 32'; Cordea (yellow card) 80'	Stadium: Prince Saud bin Jalawi Stadium; Attendance: 2,100; Referee: Abdulrahman Al-Sultan

25 November 2023 14	Al-Wehda	3–1	Al-Khaleej	Mecca
21:00	Ighalo 3', 58', 80' (pen.)	Report	Martins 22' (pen.), (yellow card) 71'; Jung Woo-young (yellow card) 48'; Hawsawi (yellow card) 74'	Stadium: King Abdul Aziz Stadium; Attendance: 447; Referee: Mohammed Al-Beredi

30 November 2023 15	Al-Ittihad	4–2	Al-Khaleej	Mecca
21:00	Coronado 9'; Benzema 29' (pen.); O. Hawsawi (yellow card) 52'; Al-Ghamdi (yellow card) 61'; Hamdallah 65' (pen.); Z. Hawsawi 74'	Report	Narey 45' (pen.); Al Hamsal (yellow card) 68'; Al-Torais 90'	Stadium: King Abdul Aziz Stadium; Attendance: 9,727; Referee: Mamdouh Al Shahdan

8 December 2023 16	Al-Khaleej	3–1	Abha	Dammam
18:00	Martins 16', (yellow card) 38' (yellow-red card) 64'; Rodrigues (yellow card) 39', (goal) 59'; Sherif 45+3'; Rebocho (yellow card) 46'; Al-Haidari (yellow card) 77'	Report	Sami 80'; Al-Kunaydiri (yellow card) 90+8'	Stadium: Prince Mohamed bin Fahd Stadium; Attendance: 2,122; Referee: Abdullah Al-Harbi

16 December 2023 17	Al-Riyadh	0–1	Al-Khaleej	Riyadh
18:00	Arslanagić (yellow card) 53'; Al Abbas (yellow card) 74'; Assiri (yellow card) 87'	Report	Hawsawi 24', (yellow card) 39'; Jung Woo-young (yellow card) 81'	Stadium: Prince Faisal bin Fahd Stadium; Attendance: 144; Referee: Raed Al-Zahrani

21 December 2023 18	Al-Khaleej	3–0	Al-Fayha	Dammam
18:00	Jung Woo-young 21'; López (yellow card) 25'; Narey 32' (pen.); Al-Khaibari 82' (o.g.)	Report	Al-Rashidi (yellow card) 31'; Al-Qaydhi (yellow card) 42'; Al-Baqawi (yellow card) 55'; Al-Khaibari (yellow card) 55'	Stadium: Prince Mohamed bin Fahd Stadium; Attendance: 5,221; Referee: Faisal Al-Blwi

29 December 2023 19	Al-Ahli	1–0	Al-Khaleej	Jeddah
21:00	Veiga (yellow card) 36'; Kessié 90+9' (pen.); Mendy (yellow card) 90+12'	Report	Hawsawi (yellow card) 56'; Al-Samiri (yellow card) 90+3'; Rodrigues (yellow card) 90+8'; Al-Khabrani (yellow card) 90+8'	Stadium: Prince Abdullah Al Faisal Stadium; Attendance: 20,786; Referee: István Kovács (Romania)

15 February 2024 20	Al-Khaleej	0–2	Al-Ettifaq	Dammam
20:00	Adams (yellow card) 59'	Report	Wijnaldum 49'; Gray 61'; Al-Shamrani (yellow card) 67'; Al-Khateeb (yellow card) 90+3'	Stadium: Prince Mohamed bin Fahd Stadium; Attendance: 4,324; Referee: Abdullah Al-Kharboush

24 February 2024 21	Al-Hazem	1–1	Al-Khaleej	Ar Rass
20:00	Moreno (yellow card) 35'; Badamosi (yellow card) 46'; Ricardo 53'; Al-Salman (yellow card) 63'	Report	Ricardo 32' (o.g.); Martins (yellow card) 48'; Nasser (yellow card) 69'; Hawsawi (yellow card) 79'	Stadium: Al-Hazem Club Stadium; Attendance: 695; Referee: Mamdouh Al Shahdan

2 March 2024 22	Al-Khaleej	0–0	Al-Shabab	Dammam
17:00	Al-Khabrani (yellow card) 9'; Martins (yellow card) 70'	Report	Carlos (yellow card) 61'; Santos (yellow card) 90'	Stadium: Prince Mohamed bin Fahd Stadium; Attendance: 3,457; Referee: Ahmed Al-Rumaikhani

9 March 2024 23	Al-Fateh	1–2	Al-Khaleej	Al-Hasa
17:00	Al-Daheem (yellow card) 58'; Saâdane 82'	Report	Jung Woo-young (yellow card) 10'; Narey 45+1'; López 59'	Stadium: Al-Fateh Club Stadium; Attendance: 6,848; Referee: Mohammed Al-Harbi

14 March 2024 24	Al-Khaleej	2–2	Al-Okhdood	Dammam
22:00	Al Salem 3', (yellow card) 52'; Jung Woo-young (yellow card) 24'; Al Hamsal 28'; Martins (yellow card) 90+5'	Report	Burcă 53' (pen.); Collado 58'; Al-Rubaie (yellow card) 76'	Stadium: Prince Mohamed bin Fahd Stadium; Attendance: 3,055; Referee: Mohammed Al-Hoaish

29 March 2024 25	Damac	0–1	Al-Khaleej	Khamis Mushait
22:00	Solan (yellow card) 19'; Antolić (yellow card) 49'; Hamed (yellow card) 90+8'; S. Hawsawi (red card) 90+10'	Report	Narey 35', (yellow card) 90+10'; Jung Woo-young (red card) 80'; Sherif (yellow card) 83'; López (yellow card) 90+1'; Martins (yellow card) 90+11'	Stadium: Damac Club Stadium; Attendance: 1,893; Referee: Sami Al-Jires

1 April 2024 26	Al-Raed	0–1	Al-Khaleej	Buraidah
22:00		Report	López (yellow card) 23'; Narey 28'; Al-Torais (yellow card) 31'	Stadium: Al-Raed Club Stadium; Attendance: 3,408; Referee: Mamdouh Al Shahdan

5 April 2024 27	Al-Khaleej	1–4	Al-Hilal	Dammam
22:00	Sherif 9'; Al Hamsal (yellow card) 45+1'; Al-Khabrani (yellow card) 90+1'	Report	Al-Shehri 7', (yellow card) 45+4'; Malcom 42', 48'; Al-Hamdan (yellow card) 81', (goal) 90+6' (pen.)	Stadium: Prince Mohamed bin Fahd Stadium; Attendance: 17,214; Referee: Harm Osmers (Germany)

18 April 2024 28	Al-Taawoun	1–1	Al-Khaleej	Buraidah
18:00	Adam 21'; Al-Ghamdi (yellow card) 62'	Report	Al-Saluli 45+5' (o.g.); Jung Woo-young (yellow card) 64'; Martins (yellow card) 88'	Stadium: Al-Taawoun Club Stadium; Attendance: 3,275; Referee: Raed Al-Zahrani

27 April 2024 29	Al-Khaleej	0–1	Al-Nassr	Dammam
21:00	Masoud (yellow card) 67'	Report	Al-Amri (yellow card) 42'; Laporte 68'; Al Fatil (yellow card) 90+5'	Stadium: Prince Mohamed bin Fahd Stadium; Attendance: 17,300; Referee: Abdullah Al-Kharboush

4 May 2024 30	Al-Tai	0–0	Al-Khaleej	Ha'il
18:00	Al-Johani (yellow card) 88'; Roco (yellow card) 90+7'	Report	Jung Woo-young (yellow card) 37'	Stadium: Prince Abdul Aziz bin Musa'ed Stadium; Attendance: 7,423; Referee: Khaled Al-Teris

10 May 2024 31	Al-Khaleej	1–2	Al-Wehda	Dammam
21:00	Hawsawi (yellow card) 11'; Masoud (yellow card) 45' (yellow-red card) 81'; Sherif 66'	Report	van Crooij (yellow card) 4'; Ighalo 27', 82' (pen.); El Yamiq (yellow card) 62'; Noor (yellow card) 87'	Stadium: Prince Mohamed bin Fahd Stadium; Attendance: 1,657; Referee: Mamdouh Al Shahdan

16 May 2024 32	Al-Khaleej	1–1	Al-Ittihad	Dammam
21:00	Jung Woo-young (yellow card) 50'; Al Haydar (yellow card) 68'; Sherif 81'	Report	Al-Shanqeeti 45+3'; Romarinho (yellow card) 79'	Stadium: Prince Mohamed bin Fahd Stadium; Attendance: 8,457; Referee: Mohammed Al-Hoaish

23 May 2024 33	Abha	2–1	Al-Khaleej	Abha
21:00	Kamano 34'; Al-Jumayah (yellow card) 72'; Noguera (yellow card) 76', (goal) 90+4'; Abdu (yellow card) 90+5'	Report	López (yellow card) 34'; Al Salem 78'; Narey (yellow card) 90+1'	Stadium: Prince Sultan bin Abdul Aziz Stadium; Attendance: 5,113; Referee: Majed Al-Shamrani

27 May 2024 34	Al-Khaleej	1–2	Al-Riyadh	Dammam
21:00	Masoud (yellow card) 67'; Al Salem 87' (pen.); Rodrigues (yellow card) 90+6'	Report	Assiri (yellow card) 45+2'; Al-Shuwayrikh (yellow card) 46'; Touré 68' (pen.); Gray 74', (yellow card) 83'	Stadium: Prince Mohamed bin Fahd Stadium; Attendance: 1,500; Referee: Sami Al-Jires

=== King Cup ===
All times are local, AST (UTC+3).

27 September 2023 Round of 32	Al-Khaleej	2–0	Al-Adalah	Dammam
21:00	Rodrigues 36'; Ouro 90+6' (o.g.)	Report	Al-Salem (yellow card) 27'; Doumbia (yellow card) 57'; Maia (yellow card) 83'	Stadium: Prince Mohamed bin Fahd Stadium; Referee: Sami Al-Jires

30 October 2023 Round of 16	Al-Khaleej	1–1 (a.e.t.) (6–5 p)	Damac	Khobar
17:45	Jung Woo-young 27'; Hawsawi (yellow card) 41'; Rebocho (yellow card) 96'; Hamzi (red card) 105+2'	Report	Chafaï (yellow card) 23'; Stanciu 33'; Ceesay (yellow card) 37'; Al-Anazi (yellow card) 120+2'	Stadium: Prince Saud bin Jalawi Stadium; Attendance: 1,096; Referee: Abdullah Al-Harbi
	Penalties
	López (penalty scored); Narey (penalty missed); Nasser (penalty scored); Al Salem (penalty scored); Rodrigues (penalty scored); Al-Samiri (penalty scored); Al-Torais (penalty scored)		(penalty scored) Chafaï; (penalty missed) Harisi; (penalty scored) Stanciu; (penalty scored) Hamed; (penalty scored) Al-Shahrani; (penalty scored) Al-Anazi; (penalty missed) Makin

11 December 2023 Quarter-finals	Abha	1–2	Al-Khaleej	Abha
15:30	Toko Ekambi 61'; Abdulelah S. (yellow card) 63'; Al-Mutairi (yellow card) 90+4'	Report	Martins 30', (yellow card) 69'; Rodrigues (yellow card) 50'; Al-Samiri (yellow card) 66'; Narey 83'	Stadium: Prince Sultan bin Abdul Aziz Stadium; Referee: Abdulsamad Bakri

1 May 2024 Semi-finals	Al-Nassr	3–1	Al-Khaleej	Riyadh
21:00	Ronaldo 17', 57'; Brozović (yellow card) 30'; Mané 37' (pen.), (yellow card) 89'; Al-Khaibari (yellow card) 53'	Report	Al Haydar (yellow card) 70'; Al-Torais 82'	Stadium: Al-Awwal Park; Attendance: 17,859; Referee: Maurizio Mariani (Italy)

== Statistics ==
=== Appearances ===
Last updated on 27 May 2024.

No.	Pos	Nat	Player	Total		Pro League		King Cup	
No.	Pos	Nat	Player	Apps	Goals	Apps	Goals	Apps	Goals
Goalkeepers
22	GK	(Saudi Arabia) KSA	Raed Ozaybi	0	0	0	0	0	0
23	GK	(Bosnia and Herzegovina) BIH	Ibrahim Šehić	29	0	27	0	2	0
96	GK	(Saudi Arabia) KSA	Marwan Al-Haidari	10	0	7+1	0	2	0
Defenders
2	DF	(Saudi Arabia) KSA	Omar Al-Owdah	6	0	3+3	0	0	0
3	DF	(Saudi Arabia) KSA	Mohammed Al-Khabrani	30	0	27	0	3	0
4	DF	(Argentina) ARG	Lisandro López	35	2	31	2	4	0
5	DF	(Portugal) POR	Pedro Rebocho	37	0	34	0	3	0
13	DF	(Saudi Arabia) KSA	Abdullah Al-Shanqiti	12	0	2+8	0	1+1	0
14	DF	(Saudi Arabia) KSA	Ali Al-Shaafi	0	0	0	0	0	0
25	DF	(Saudi Arabia) KSA	Arif Al Haydar	23	0	4+17	0	0+2	0
33	DF	(Saudi Arabia) KSA	Bander Nasser	13	0	3+8	0	1+1	0
39	DF	(Saudi Arabia) KSA	Saeed Al Hamsal	34	1	27+3	1	4	0
66	DF	(Saudi Arabia) KSA	Hussain Furayj	0	0	0	0	0	0
Midfielders
6	MF	(Saudi Arabia) KSA	Khaled Al-Samiri	22	0	5+13	0	0+4	0
7	MF	(Togo) TOG	Khaled Narey	32	8	27+1	7	3+1	1
8	MF	(Portugal) POR	Ivo Rodrigues	34	2	30	1	4	1
10	MF	(Portugal) POR	Fábio Martins	33	8	28+1	7	4	1
15	MF	(Saudi Arabia) KSA	Mansour Hamzi	32	2	19+11	2	1+1	0
18	MF	(Saudi Arabia) KSA	Abdulelah Hawsawi	30	1	17+9	1	3+1	0
19	MF	(Saudi Arabia) KSA	Mohammed Al-Abdullah	0	0	0	0	0	0
27	MF	(Saudi Arabia) KSA	Fawaz Al-Torais	21	2	5+12	1	1+3	1
47	MF	(England) ENG	Mo Adams	6	0	2+4	0	0	0
55	MF	(South Korea) KOR	Jung Woo-young	35	2	31	1	4	1
88	MF	(Saudi Arabia) KSA	Naif Masoud	12	0	8+3	0	0+1	0
99	MF	(Saudi Arabia) KSA	Hamad Al-Abdan	7	0	1+6	0	0	0
Forwards
9	FW	(Egypt) EGY	Mohamed Sherif	36	6	26+6	6	3+1	0
11	FW	(Saudi Arabia) KSA	Abdullah Al-Salem	37	3	9+25	3	1+2	0
Players sent out on loan this season
16	DF	(Saudi Arabia) KSA	Mohammed Al-Khaibari	0	0	0	0	0	0
17	MF	(Saudi Arabia) KSA	Hassan Al-Majhad	5	0	0+4	0	0+1	0
77	FW	(Saudi Arabia) KSA	Hisham Al Dubais	3	1	0+3	1	0	0
Player who made an appearance this season but have left the club
70	MF	(Saudi Arabia) KSA	Riyadh Al-Ibrahim	2	0	1+1	0	0	0

=== Goalscorers ===
Rank	No.	Pos	Nat	Name	Pro League	King Cup	Total
1	7	MF	(Togo)	Khaled Narey	7	1	8
1	10	MF	(Portugal)	Fábio Martins	7	1	8
3	9	FW	(Egypt)	Mohamed Sherif	6	0	6
4	11	FW	(Saudi Arabia)	Abdullah Al-Salem	3	0	3
5	4	DF	(Argentina)	Lisandro López	2	0	2
5	8	MF	(Portugal)	Ivo Rodrigues	1	1	2
5	15	MF	(Saudi Arabia)	Mansour Hamzi	2	0	2
5	27	MF	(Saudi Arabia)	Fawaz Al-Torais	1	1	2
5	55	MF	(South Korea)	Jung Woo-young	1	1	2
10	18	MF	(Saudi Arabia)	Abdulelah Hawsawi	1	0	1
10	39	DF	(Saudi Arabia)	Saeed Al Hamsal	1	0	1
10	77	FW	(Saudi Arabia)	Hisham Al Dubais	1	0	1
Own goal					3	1	4
Total					36	6	42

Last Updated: 27 May 2024

=== Assists ===
Rank	No.	Pos	Nat	Name	Pro League	King Cup	Total
1	5	DF	(Portugal)	Pedro Rebocho	3	2	5
1	10	MF	(Portugal)	Fábio Martins	5	0	5
3	7	MF	(Togo)	Khaled Narey	2	0	2
3	8	MF	(Portugal)	Ivo Rodrigues	2	0	2
3	11	FW	(Saudi Arabia)	Abdullah Al-Salem	1	1	2
3	15	MF	(Saudi Arabia)	Mansour Hamzi	2	0	2
3	25	DF	(Saudi Arabia)	Arif Al Haydar	1	1	2
8	9	FW	(Egypt)	Mohamed Sherif	1	0	1
8	18	MF	(Saudi Arabia)	Abdulelah Hawsawi	1	0	1
8	70	MF	(Saudi Arabia)	Riyadh Al-Ibrahim	1	0	1
Total					19	4	23

Last Updated: 16 May 2024

=== Clean sheets ===
Rank	No.	Pos	Nat	Name	Pro League	King Cup	Total
1	23	GK	(Bosnia and Herzegovina)	Ibrahim Šehić	8	0	8
2	96	GK	(Saudi Arabia)	Marwan Al-Haidari	1	1	2
Total					8	1	9

Last Updated: 4 May 2024
