= 2022–23 Al-Khaleej FC season =

Al-Khaleej
2022–23 season
- President: Alaa Al-Heml
- Manager: Pedro Emanuel
- Stadium: Prince Mohamed bin Fahd Stadium
- SPL: 14th
- King Cup: Round of 16 (knocked out by Al-Fayha)
- Top goalscorer: League: Sokol Cikalleshi (10); All: Sokol Cikalleshi (11)
- Highest home attendance: 15,355 v Al-Ittihad; 3 March 2023; Saudi Pro League
- Lowest home attendance: 1,000 v Al-Fayha; 15 December 2022; Saudi Pro League
- Average home league attendance: 5,638
- Biggest win: 3–0 v Al-Raed; 20 January 2023; Saudi Pro League
- Biggest defeat: 0–4 v Al-Shabab; 15 October 2022; Saudi Pro League
Home colours	Away colours
- All statistics correct as of 31 May 2023.

The 2022–23 season was Al-Khaleej's 78th year in existence and their first season back in the Pro League following their promotion from the FD League in the previous season. The club participated in the Pro League, and the King Cup.

The season covered the period from 1 July 2022 to 30 June 2023.

== Players ==
=== Squad information ===
As of 1 February 2023

Note: Flags indicate national team as defined under FIFA eligibility rules; some limited exceptions apply. Players may hold more than one non-FIFA nationality.

No.	Pos.	Nation	Player
1	GK	BRA	Douglas Friedrich
2	DF	KSA	Omar Al-Owdah
3	DF	KSA	Mohammed Al-Khabrani
5	DF	POR	Pedro Amaral
6	MF	KSA	Khaled Al-Samiri (on loan from Al-Ittihad)
7	MF	KSA	Riyadh Al-Ibrahim
8	MF	BRA	Lucas Souza
9	MF	ALB	Sokol Cikalleshi (on loan from Konyaspor)
10	MF	BRA	Morato
11	MF	KSA	Mohammed Al-Sahli
12	GK	KSA	Taher Al-Hajji (on loan from Al-Faisaly)
13	DF	KSA	Abdullah Al-Shanqiti
14	FW	KSA	Saleh Al Abbas (on loan from Al-Faisaly)
15	MF	GAB	André Biyogo Poko

No.	Pos.	Nation	Player
17	MF	KSA	Hassan Al-Majhad
19	MF	KSA	Mohammed Al-Abdullah
20	DF	KSA	Abdullah Al-Harbi (captain)
23	MF	KSA	Qassem Abo Nayyan
24	DF	KSA	Hani Al-Sebyani (on loan from Al-Ahli)
25	DF	NGA	Izuchuckwu Anthony
27	DF	KSA	Hussain Al-Nowaiqi
33	DF	KSA	Hussain Furayj
48	MF	KSA	Abdullah Al-Samti
49	MF	KSA	Ahmed Al-Zain (on loan from Damac)
58	MF	KSA	Ayman Al-Hujaili
93	MF	POR	Fábio Martins
96	GK	KSA	Marwan Al-Haidari
99	MF	KSA	Hamad Al-Abdan (on loan from Al-Hilal)

=== Out on loan ===
Note: Flags indicate national team as defined under FIFA eligibility rules; some limited exceptions apply. Players may hold more than one non-FIFA nationality.

No.	Pos.	Nation	Player
21	MF	KSA	Hussain Al-Ohaymid (at Al-Safa until 30 June 2023)
22	MF	KSA	Malek Al-Darwish (at Al-Bukiryah until 30 June 2023)

No.	Pos.	Nation	Player
53	DF	KSA	Ali Al-Shaafi (at Al-Qaisumah until 30 June 2023)
77	FW	KSA	Hisham Al Dubais (at Al-Sahel until 30 June 2023)

== Transfers and loans ==
=== Transfers in ===
Entry date	Position	No.	Player	From club	Fee	Ref.
1 July 2022	DF	4	(Algeria) Djamel Benlamri	Qatar	Free	
12 July 2022	GK	1	(Brazil) Douglas Friedrich	(Brazil) Avaí	Free	
12 July 2022	MF	48	(Saudi Arabia) Abdullah Al-Samti	(Saudi Arabia) Al-Qadsiah	Free	
13 July 2022	MF	58	(Saudi Arabia) Ayman Al-Hujaili	(Saudi Arabia) Damac	Free	
23 July 2022	MF	11	(Saudi Arabia) Mohammed Al-Sahli	(Saudi Arabia) Damac	Undisclosed	
27 July 2022	DF	2	(Saudi Arabia) Omar Al-Owdah	(Saudi Arabia) Al-Batin	Free	
27 July 2022	DF	13	(Saudi Arabia) Abdullah Al-Shanqiti	(Saudi Arabia) Al-Nassr	Undisclosed	
28 July 2022	MF	15	(Gabon) André Biyogo Poko	(Turkey) Altay	Free	
29 July 2022	MF	8	(Brazil) Lucas Souza	(Cyprus) APOEL	Free	
9 August 2022	GK	96	(Saudi Arabia) Marwan Al-Haidari	(Saudi Arabia) Al-Shabab	Free	
13 August 2022	FW	10	(Brazil) Morato	(Brazil) Red Bull Bragantino	Undisclosed	
20 August 2022	DF	25	(Nigeria) Izuchuckwu Anthony	(Israel) Hapoel Haifa	Free	
22 August 2022	DF	3	(Saudi Arabia) Mohammed Al-Khabrani	(Saudi Arabia) Al-Ahli	Undisclosed	
1 January 2023	MF	93	(Portugal) Fábio Martins	(United Arab Emirates) Al-Wahda	Free	
19 January 2023	DF	5	(Portugal) Pedro Amaral	(Portugal) Rio Ave	Free	

=== Loans in ===
Start date	End date	Position	No.	Player	From club	Fee	Ref.
12 July 2022	1 January 2023	FW	94	(Colombia) Brayan Riascos	(Ukraine) Metalist Kharkiv	None	
25 July 2022	End of season	GK	12	(Saudi Arabia) Taher Al-Hajji	(Saudi Arabia) Al-Faisaly	None	
25 July 2022	End of season	FW	14	(Saudi Arabia) Saleh Al Abbas	(Saudi Arabia) Al-Faisaly	None	
2 August 2022	28 January 2023	DF	16	(Saudi Arabia) Hazim Al-Zahrani	(Saudi Arabia) Al-Ittihad	None	
24 August 2022	End of season	FW	9	(Albania) Sokol Cikalleshi	(Turkey) Konyaspor	None	
27 August 2022	End of season	MF	6	(Saudi Arabia) Khaled Al-Samiri	(Saudi Arabia) Al-Ittihad	None	
28 August 2022	End of season	MF	99	(Saudi Arabia) Hamad Al-Abdan	(Saudi Arabia) Al-Hilal	None	
31 August 2022	End of season	DF	24	(Saudi Arabia) Hani Al-Sebyani	(Saudi Arabia) Al-Ahli	None	
27 January 2023	End of season	MF	49	(Saudi Arabia) Ahmed Al-Zain	(Saudi Arabia) Damac	None	

=== Transfers out ===
Exit date	Position	No.	Player	To club	Fee	Ref.
30 June 2022	GK	77	(Saudi Arabia) Taher Al-Hajji	(Saudi Arabia) Al-Faisaly	End of loan	
30 June 2022	DF	2	(Saudi Arabia) Nasser Al-Hulayel	(Saudi Arabia) Al-Tai	End of loan	
30 June 2022	DF	89	(Saudi Arabia) Fahad Al-Johani	(Saudi Arabia) Ohod	End of loan	
1 July 2022	DF	4	(Saudi Arabia) Bader Al-Nakhli	(Saudi Arabia) Al-Rawdhah	Free	
1 July 2022	MF	55	(Serbia) Miodrag Gemović	(Saudi Arabia) Al-Riyadh	Free	
1 July 2022	MF	69	(Brazil) Diego Miranda	(Saudi Arabia) Al-Riyadh	Free	
1 July 2022	FW	9	(Ivory Coast) Mamadou Soro	(Kuwait) Al-Qadsia	Free	
2 July 2022	MF	5	(Saudi Arabia) Rayan Al-Harbi	(Saudi Arabia) Al-Jabalain	Free	
3 July 2022	GK	22	(Saudi Arabia) Mutab Sharahili	(Saudi Arabia) Al-Arabi	Free	
3 July 2022	DF	36	(Saudi Arabia) Hussein Halawani	(Saudi Arabia) Hajer	Free	
5 July 2022	DF	12	(Ghana) Samuel Sarfo	(Kuwait) Al-Tadamon	Free	
5 July 2022	FW	3	(Saudi Arabia) Jassem Al-Hamdan	(Saudi Arabia) Al-Nairyah	Free	
14 July 2022	MF	10	(Saudi Arabia) Mohammed Al-Qunaian	(Saudi Arabia) Al-Tai	Free	
29 July 2022	MF	14	(Saudi Arabia) Ali Al-Shoalah	(Saudi Arabia) Al-Taraji	Free	
6 August 2022	MF	11	(Saudi Arabia) Abdullah Al-Ghamdi	(Saudi Arabia) Najran	Free	
13 August 2022	DF	18	(Saudi Arabia) Eissa Al-Saeed	(Saudi Arabia) Al-Nahda	Free	
16 August 2022	GK	1	(Saudi Arabia) Redha Al-Antaif	(Saudi Arabia) Al-Noor	Free	
18 August 2022	MF	66	(Tunisia) Mondher Guesmi	(Jordan) Al-Hussein	Free	
26 August 2022	GK	88	(Saudi Arabia) Wadia Al-Obaid	(Saudi Arabia) Al-Safa	Free	
23 September 2022	MF	6	(Saudi Arabia) Yahya Otain	(Saudi Arabia) Al-Nairyah	Free	
28 October 2022	MF	50	(Saudi Arabia) Abdullah Al-Matroud	(Saudi Arabia) Mudhar	Free	
1 January 2023	FW	94	(Colombia) Brayan Riascos	(Ukraine) Metalist Kharkiv	End of loan	
12 January 2023	DF	4	(Algeria) Djamel Benlamri		Released	
28 January 2023	DF	16	(Saudi Arabia) Hazim Al-Zahrani	(Saudi Arabia) Al-Ittihad	End of loan	

=== Loans out ===
Start date	End date	Position	No.	Player	To club	Fee	Ref.
23 August 2022	End of season	DF	53	(Saudi Arabia) Ali Al-Shaafi	(Saudi Arabia) Al-Qaisumah	None	
7 September 2022	End of season	MF	21	(Saudi Arabia) Hussain Al-Ohaymid	(Saudi Arabia) Al-Safa	None	
28 January 2023	End of season	MF	22	(Saudi Arabia) Malek Al-Darwish	(Saudi Arabia) Al-Bukiryah	None	
29 January 2023	End of season	FW	77	(Saudi Arabia) Hisham Al Dubais	(Saudi Arabia) Al-Sahel	None	

== Pre-season ==
3 August 2022 Friendly	Al-Khaleej (Saudi Arabia)	2–1	(United Arab Emirates) Al-Bataeh	Başiskele, Turkey
18:00 TRT	Al-Shanqiti; Al Dubais	Report		Stadium: Kullar Spor Tesisleri

6 August 2022 Friendly	Al-Khaleej (Saudi Arabia)	0–0	(Saudi Arabia) Al-Ahli	Turkey
17:00 TRT		Report

10 August 2022 Friendly	Al-Khaleej (Saudi Arabia)	1–2	(Kuwait) Al-Sahel	Başiskele, Turkey
17:30 TRT	Al-Nowaiqi 65'	Report		Stadium: Kullar Spor Tesisleri

13 August 2022 Friendly	Al-Khaleej (Saudi Arabia)	2–2	(Kuwait) Al-Salmiya	Başiskele, Turkey
18:00 TRT	Al Dubais 80'; Al-Hujaili 83'	Report	Lima 10'; Rustom 35'	Stadium: Kullar Spor Tesisleri

14 August 2022 Friendly	Al-Khaleej (Saudi Arabia)	0–1	(Saudi Arabia) Al-Ettifaq	Sapanca, Turkey
18:00 TRT		Report	Quaison 68' (pen.)	Stadium: Sapanca Kurtköy Stadı

20 August 2022 Friendly	Al-Khaleej (Saudi Arabia)	2–0	Bahrain	Saihat, Saudi Arabia
18:45 AST	Al Abbas 1'; Al-Ibrahim 11'	Report		Stadium: Prince Nayef bin Abdulaziz Stadium

== Competitions ==
=== Overview ===
Competition	Record							
Competition	G	W	D	L	GF	GA	GD	Win %
Pro League	30	9	4	17	30	44	−14	30.00
King Cup	1	0	0	1	1	3	−2	0.00
Total	31	9	4	18	31	47	−16	29.03

Updated to match played 31 May 2023
Source: Competitions

=== Pro League ===
==== League table ====
Pos	Team	Pld	W	D	L	GF	GA	GD	Pts	Qualification or relegation
12	Abha	30	10	3	17	33	52	−19	33 (Note: Al-Fayha finished ahead of Abha on head-to-head points: Al-Fayha: 4 pts, Abha: 1 pts (Abha 1–1 Al-Fayha, Al-Fayha 2–0 Abha).)	
13	Al-Wehda	30	8	8	14	26	43	−17	32	
14	Al-Khaleej	30	9	4	17	30	44	−14	31	
15	Al-Adalah (R)	30	7	7	16	30	56	−26	28	Relegated to the First Division League
16	Al-Batin (R)	30	5	5	20	27	63	−36	20	Relegated to the First Division League

Updated to match(es) played on 31 May 2023. Source: SPL
Rules for classification: 1) Points; 2) Head-to-head points; 3) Head-to-head goal difference; 4) Total goal difference; 5) Total goals scored; 6) Fair-play points (Note: Head-to-head record is used only after all the matches between the teams in question have been played).
(R) Relegated

==== Results summary ====
Overall								Home						Away					
Pld	W	D	L	GF	GA	GD	Pts	W	D	L	GF	GA	GD	W	D	L	GF	GA	GD
30	9	4	17	30	44	−14	31	6	2	7	20	21	−1	3	2	10	10	23	−13

Last updated: 31 May 2023.
Source: spl.com.sa

==== Results by round ====
Round	1	2	3	4	5	6	7	8	9	10	11	12	13	14	15	16	17	18	19	20	21	22	23	24	25	26	27	28	29	30
Ground	H	A	H	A	H	A	H	A	H	A	H	A	H	H	A	A	H	A	H	A	H	A	H	A	H	A	H	A	A	H
Result	L	L	D	L	W	L	L	L	L	L	L	W	W	W	L	L	W	L	L	L	D	L	L	W	W	D	L	W	D	W
Position	14	13	14	14	11	13	14	14	15	14	15	15	14	14	14	14	13	14	14	14	14	14	15	15	14	14	14	14	14	14

Updated to match(es) played on 31 May 2023. Source: spl.com.sa
A = Away; H = Home; W = Win; D = Draw; L = Loss

==== Matches ====
All times are local, AST (UTC+3).

Win Draw Loss Postponed

25 August 2022 1	Al-Khaleej	0–2	Al-Hilal	Dammam
21:00	Al-Nowaiqi (yellow card) 47'; Al-Sahli (yellow card) 67'	Report	Ighalo 3'; Marega 25'; Carrillo (yellow card) 80'	Stadium: Prince Mohamed bin Fahd Stadium; Attendance: 13,218; Referee: Majed Al-Shamrani

2 September 2022 2	Damac	2–1	Al-Khaleej	Abha
21:00	Hamzi 8'; Maher (yellow card) 50'; Antolić 90+3' (pen.)	Report	Bedrane 10' (o.g.); Al-Nowaiqi (yellow card) 36'; Cikalleshi (yellow card) 82'; Al-Ibrahim (yellow card) 90+4'	Stadium: Prince Sultan bin Abdul Aziz Stadium; Attendance: 746; Referee: Abdullah Al-Harbi

8 September 2022 3	Al-Khaleej	0–0	Al-Adalah	Dammam
18:30	Benlamri (yellow card) 75'; Al-Samiri (yellow card) 87'	Report	Al-Hamdhi (yellow card) 49'; Al-Habib (yellow card) 70'	Stadium: Prince Mohamed bin Fahd Stadium; Attendance: 1,968; Referee: Mohammed Al-Beredi

15 September 2022 4	Al-Ittihad	2–0	Al-Khaleej	Jeddah
21:00	Hamdallah 4', 69'; Al-Nashri (yellow card) 45+4'; Al-Shamrani (yellow card) 90+5'	Report	Souza (yellow card) 56'; Anthony (yellow card) 68'; Al-Zahrani (red card) 73'	Stadium: King Abdullah Sports City; Attendance: 25,049; Referee: Fernando Rapallini (Argentine)

1 October 2022 5	Al-Khaleej	1–0	Al-Batin	Dammam
21:00	Al-Owdah (yellow card) 29'; Al-Hujaili (yellow card) 37'; Souza 90'; Al-Darwish (yellow card) 90+5'	Report	Mamdouh (yellow card) 45+2'; Y. Al-Shammari (yellow card) 55'; Fawaz (yellow card) 58'; Huriss (yellow card) 74'; Al-Shamlan (yellow card) 86'	Stadium: Prince Mohamed bin Fahd Stadium; Attendance: 2,367; Referee: Abdullah Al-Kharboush

6 October 2022 6	Al-Tai	3–0	Al-Khaleej	Ha'il
18:30	Musona 18' (pen.), 53', 61'; Al-Harabi (yellow card) 45+1'; Ali (yellow card) 72'	Report		Stadium: Prince Abdul Aziz bin Musa'ed Stadium; Attendance: 7,455; Referee: Mohammed Al-Harbi

11 October 2022 7	Al-Khaleej	1–2	Al-Fateh	Dammam
20:30	Riascos (yellow card) 27'; Al-Khabrani (yellow card) 86'; Cikalleshi 90+2' (pen.); Al Abbas (yellow card) 90+3'	Report	Al-Buraikan 15'; Batna (yellow card) 90+1'; Saâdane 90+11'	Stadium: Prince Mohamed bin Fahd Stadium; Attendance: 1,953; Referee: Ahmed Al-Rumaikhani

15 October 2022 8	Al-Shabab	4–0	Al-Khaleej	Riyadh
20:30	Carlos 2'; Guanca 59'; Boupendza 86'; Abdu Jaber 90+3'	Report		Stadium: Prince Faisal bin Fahd Stadium; Attendance: 7,354; Referee: Majed Al-Shamrani

15 December 2022 9	Al-Khaleej	1–2	Al-Fayha	Khobar
15:30	Al-Khaibari 54' (o.g.); Al-Shanqiti (yellow card) 66'	Report	Nwakaeme 17' (pen.); Ryller (yellow card) 30'; Al-Khalaf 55', (yellow card) 83'	Stadium: Prince Saud bin Jalawi Stadium; Attendance: 1,000; Referee: Majed Al-Shamrani

25 December 2022 10	Al-Ettifaq	1–0	Al-Khaleej	Dammam
20:30	Hazazi 46', (yellow card) 62'; Özdemir (yellow card) 48'; H. Al-Ghamdi (yellow card) 74'	Report	Al-Shanqiti (yellow card) 9'	Stadium: Prince Mohamed bin Fahd Stadium; Attendance: 3,522; Referee: Khaled Al-Teris

31 December 2022 11	Al-Khaleej	0–1	Al-Nassr	Dammam
20:30	Al-Samiri (yellow card) 51'; Souza (yellow card) 79'; Al Dubais (yellow card) 90+7'	Report	Aboubakar 5'; Talisca (yellow card) 54'; Al-Amri (yellow card) 90'	Stadium: Prince Mohamed bin Fahd Stadium; Attendance: 13,810; Referee: Sami Al-Jires

6 January 2023 12	Al-Taawoun	0–1	Al-Khaleej	Buraidah
18:00	Al-Saluli (yellow card) 45+2'	Report	Martins (yellow card) 27', (goal) 58'	Stadium: King Abdullah Sport City Stadium; Attendance: 2,767; Referee: Abdullah Al-Kharboush

13 January 2023 13	Al-Khaleej	3–2	Al-Wehda	Dammam
18:00	Cikalleshi 9'; Anthony (yellow card) 23'; Martins 70', 87'	Report	Anselmo (yellow card) 29'; Rodrigues 32'; Yoda 80'; Bakshween (yellow card) 90'	Stadium: Prince Mohamed bin Fahd Stadium; Attendance: 3,917; Referee: Sami Al-Jires

20 January 2023 14	Al-Khaleej	3–0	Al-Raed	Dammam
15:30	Poko 31'; Al-Abdan (yellow card) 48'; Martins (yellow card) 49'; Al-Samiri 60'; Cikalleshi 89'	Report	Fouzair (yellow card) 19'	Stadium: Prince Mohamed bin Fahd Stadium; Attendance: 3,979; Referee: Mohammed Al-Harbi

2 February 2023 15	Abha	2–0	Al-Khaleej	Abha
16:00	Al-Zori (yellow card) 15'; Natiq (yellow card) 40', (goal) 71'; Bguir 81'	Report	Poko (yellow card) 14'; Amaral (yellow card) 17'	Stadium: Prince Sultan bin Abdul Aziz Stadium; Attendance: 569; Referee: Ahmed Al-Rumaikhani

18 February 2023 17	Al-Khaleej	2–0	Damac	Dammam
18:00	Al-Shanqiti (yellow card) 29'; Cikalleshi 32', 45' (pen.)	Report	Zeghba (yellow card) 43'; Al-Nakhli (yellow card) 47'; Al-Shammeri (yellow card) 56'	Stadium: Prince Mohamed bin Fahd Stadium; Attendance: 3,807; Referee: Abdullah Al-Harbi

24 February 2023 18	Al-Adalah	2–0	Al-Khaleej	Al-Hasa
18:00	Tijanić (yellow card) 9'; Lenis 50'; Al-Hamdhi (yellow card) 69'; Antonsson 71'; Al-Oufi (yellow card) 82'	Report	Al-Nowaiqi (yellow card) 40'; Al-Shanqiti (yellow card) 75'; Souza (yellow card) 90+4'	Stadium: Prince Abdullah bin Jalawi Stadium; Attendance: 9,677; Referee: Radu Petrescu (Romania)

3 March 2023 19	Al-Khaleej	0–3	Al-Ittihad	Dammam
16:00	Al-Samiri (yellow card) 90+2'	Report	Hamdallah 54' (pen.); Romarinho 69'; Sharahili 73'	Stadium: Prince Mohamed bin Fahd Stadium; Attendance: 15,355; Referee: Bastian Dankert (Germany)

9 March 2023 20	Al-Batin	1–0	Al-Khaleej	Hafar al-Batin
16:00	Y. Al-Shammari 5'; Al-Qarni (yellow card) 43'; López (yellow card) 90+2'	Report	Martins (yellow card) 83'	Stadium: Al-Batin Club Stadium; Attendance: 3,218; Referee: Faisal Al-Blwi

16 March 2023 21	Al-Khaleej	2–2	Al-Tai	Dammam
16:00	Cikalleshi 13'; Al-Abdan 45+3'; Martins (yellow card) 81'; Friedrich (yellow card) 90+1'	Report	Fai (yellow card) 24'; Al-Johani 79'; Al-Harabi (yellow card) 89'; Friedrich 90+3'	Stadium: Prince Mohamed bin Fahd Stadium; Attendance: 1,788; Referee: Mamdouh Al Shahdan

1 April 2023 16	Al-Hilal	2–0	Al-Khaleej	Riyadh
22:00	Kanno (yellow card) 16'; Ighalo 39', 45+6' (pen.)	Report	Anthony (yellow card) 45+5'; Al-Samiri (yellow card) 80'	Stadium: Prince Faisal bin Fahd Stadium; Attendance: 7,662; Referee: João Pinheiro (Portugal)

6 April 2023 22	Al-Fateh	2–0	Al-Khaleej	Al-Hasa
22:00	Vélez (yellow card) 28'; Batna 65'; Tello (yellow card) 69'; Al-Buraikan (yellow card) 89', (goal) 90+2'	Report	Martins (yellow card) 35'; Al-Khabrani (yellow card) 68'; Al Abbas (yellow card) 90'	Stadium: Prince Abdullah bin Jalawi Stadium; Attendance: 9,362; Referee: Abdulsamad Bakri

11 April 2023 23	Al-Khaleej	2–3	Al-Shabab	Dammam
22:00	Cikalleshi (yellow card) 12', (goal) 38'; Martins 14', (yellow card) 64'	Report	Guanca 3'; Boupendza 6'; Al-Qahtani (yellow card) 20', (goal) 59'; Al=Sqoor (yellow card) 49'; Santos (yellow card) 90+1'	Stadium: Prince Mohamed bin Fahd Stadium; Attendance: 1,771; Referee: Sami Al-Jires

28 April 2023 24	Al-Fayha	0–3	Al-Khaleej	Al Majma'ah
21:30	Ruiz (yellow card) 24'; Paulinho (yellow card) 80'; Nasser (yellow card) 84'	Report	Cikalleshi 23' (pen.); Martins (yellow card) 41', (goal) 54'; Poko 67'	Stadium: Al Majma'ah Sports City; Attendance: 2,665; Referee: Shukri Al-Hanfoush

2 May 2023 25	Al-Khaleej	2–1	Al-Ettifaq	Dammam
21:30	Al-Owdah (yellow card) 29'; Cikalleshi 34' (pen.); Martins 71'	Report	Al-Kuwaykibi 22'; F. Al-Ghamdi (yellow card) 35'	Stadium: Prince Mohamed bin Fahd Stadium; Attendance: 6,988; Referee: Abdullah Al-Shehri

8 May 2023 26	Al-Nassr	1–1	Al-Khaleej	Riyadh
19:00	González 17'; Al-Hassan (yellow card) 39'; Boushal (yellow card) 90+1'	Report	Martins 4'; Souza (yellow card) 30'; Al-Owdah (yellow card) 52'; Al-Haidari (yellow card) 87'	Stadium: Al-Awwal Park; Attendance: 16,742; Referee: Majed Al-Shamrani

15 May 2023 27	Al-Khaleej	0–2	Al-Taawoun	Dammam
19:00	Al-Samiri (yellow card) 90+3'; Al Abbas (yellow card) 90+5'	Report	Kadesh (yellow card) 39'; Tawamba 60'; Kaku 67'	Stadium: Prince Mohamed bin Fahd Stadium; Attendance: 3,882; Referee: Abdullah Al-Shehri

22 May 2023 28	Al-Wehda	1–4	Al-Khaleej	Mecca
21:30	Al-Ghamdi 20'; Duarte (yellow card) 57'	Report	Amaral 10'; Morato 18', 66'; Cikalleshi 58' (pen.); Al-Nowaiqi (yellow card) 87'	Stadium: King Abdul Aziz Stadium; Attendance: 3,911; Referee: Faisal Al-Blwi

27 May 2023 29	Al-Raed	0–0	Al-Khaleej	Buraidah
21:00	Fouzair (yellow card) 13'; Salem (yellow card) 90+1'; Khamis (yellow card) 90+7'	Report		Stadium: King Abdullah Sport City Stadium; Attendance: 4,490; Referee: Abdullah Al-Kharboush

31 May 2023 30	Al-Khaleej	3–1	Abha	Dammam
21:00	Souza 46'; Al-Khabrani (yellow card) 49' (yellow-red card) 52'; Morato 74', 84'; Martins (yellow card) 80'; Al-Shanqiti (yellow card) 90+3'	Report	Al-Selouli 25'; Matić (yellow card) 45'	Stadium: Prince Mohamed bin Fahd Stadium; Attendance: Sami Al-Jires; Referee: 8,771

=== King Cup ===
All times are local, AST (UTC+3).

20 December 2022 Round of 16	Al-Fayha	3–1	Al-Khaleej	Al Majma'ah
18:00	Al-Zaqaan 29'; Paulinho (yellow card) 44'; Abousaban 45+1', (yellow card) 45+4'; Al Freej (yellow card) 82'; Mandash 90+5'	Report	Cikalleshi 19'; Al-Zahrani (yellow card) 63'; Morato (yellow card) 84'	Stadium: Al Majma'ah Sports City; Referee: Abdullah Al-Kharboush

== Statistics ==
=== Appearances ===
Last updated on 31 May 2023.

No.	Pos	Nat	Player	Total		Pro League		King Cup	
No.	Pos	Nat	Player	Apps	Goals	Apps	Goals	Apps	Goals
Goalkeepers
1	GK	(Brazil) BRA	Douglas Friedrich	22	0	21	0	1	0
35	GK	(Saudi Arabia) KSA	Rayan Al-Dossari	0	0	0	0	0	0
96	GK	(Saudi Arabia) KSA	Marwan Al-Haidari	9	0	9	0	0	0
Defenders
2	DF	(Saudi Arabia) KSA	Omar Al-Owdah	27	0	18+8	0	1	0
3	DF	(Saudi Arabia) KSA	Mohammed Al-Khabrani	27	0	21+5	0	1	0
5	DF	(Portugal) POR	Pedro Amaral	15	1	15	1	0	0
13	DF	(Saudi Arabia) KSA	Abdullah Al-Shanqiti	16	0	12+3	0	1	0
20	DF	(Saudi Arabia) KSA	Abdullah Al-Harbi	4	0	1+3	0	0	0
24	DF	(Saudi Arabia) KSA	Hani Al-Sebyani	10	0	4+6	0	0	0
25	DF	(Nigeria) NGA	Izuchuckwu Anthony	24	0	22+1	0	0+1	0
27	DF	(Saudi Arabia) KSA	Hussain Al-Nowaiqi	22	0	18+3	0	0+1	0
33	DF	(Saudi Arabia) KSA	Hussain Furayj	0	0	0	0	0	0
Midfielders
6	MF	(Saudi Arabia) KSA	Khaled Al-Samiri	24	1	18+5	1	1	0
7	MF	(Saudi Arabia) KSA	Riyadh Al-Ibrahim	3	0	1+2	0	0	0
8	MF	(Brazil) BRA	Lucas Souza	30	2	29	2	1	0
10	MF	(Brazil) BRA	Morato	22	4	19+2	4	1	0
11	MF	(Saudi Arabia) KSA	Mohammed Al-Sahli	16	0	3+13	0	0	0
15	MF	(Gabon) GAB	André Biyogo Poko	30	2	29	2	1	0
17	MF	(Saudi Arabia) KSA	Hassan Al-Majhad	18	0	2+16	0	0	0
48	MF	(Saudi Arabia) KSA	Abdullah Al-Samti	1	0	0+1	0	0	0
49	MF	(Saudi Arabia) KSA	Ahmed Al-Zain	11	0	7+4	0	0	0
58	MF	(Saudi Arabia) KSA	Ayman Al-Hujaili	17	0	5+11	0	1	0
93	MF	(Portugal) POR	Fábio Martins	17	7	17	7	0	0
99	MF	(Saudi Arabia) KSA	Hamad Al-Abdan	24	1	12+11	1	0+1	0
Forwards
9	FW	(Albania) ALB	Sokol Cikalleshi	30	11	29	10	1	1
14	FW	(Saudi Arabia) KSA	Saleh Al Abbas	25	0	1+23	0	0+1	0
Players sent out on loan this season
22	MF	(Saudi Arabia) KSA	Malek Al-Darwish	3	0	1+2	0	0	0
77	FW	(Saudi Arabia) KSA	Hisham Al Dubais	4	0	0+4	0	0	0
Player who made an appearance this season but have left the club
4	DF	(Algeria) ALG	Djamel Benlamri	9	0	9	0	0	0
16	DF	(Saudi Arabia) KSA	Hazim Al-Zahrani	6	0	3+2	0	1	0
94	FW	(Colombia) COL	Brayan Riascos	6	0	4+2	0	0	0

=== Goalscorers ===
Rank	No.	Pos	Nat	Name	Pro League	King Cup	Total
1	9	FW	(Albania)	Sokol Cikalleshi	10	1	11
2	93	MF	(Portugal)	Fábio Martins	7	0	7
3	10	MF	(Brazil)	Morato	4	0	4
4	8	MF	(Brazil)	Lucas Souza	2	0	2
4	15	MF	(Gabon)	André Biyogo Poko	2	0	2
6	5	DF	(Portugal)	Pedro Amaral	1	0	1
6	6	MF	(Saudi Arabia)	Khaled Al-Samiri	1	0	1
6	99	MF	(Saudi Arabia)	Hamad Al-Abdan	1	0	1
Own goal					2	0	2
Total					30	1	31

Last Updated: 31 May 2023

=== Assists ===
Rank	No.	Pos	Nat	Name	Pro League	King Cup	Total
1	10	MF	(Brazil)	Morato	4	1	5
1	15	MF	(Gabon)	André Biyogo Poko	5	0	5
3	9	FW	(Albania)	Sokol Cikalleshi	3	0	3
3	93	MF	(Portugal)	Fábio Martins	3	0	3
5	8	MF	(Brazil)	Lucas Souza	2	0	2
5	27	DF	(Saudi Arabia)	Hussain Al-Nowaiqi	2	0	2
7	5	DF	(Portugal)	Pedro Amaral	1	0	1
7	14	FW	(Saudi Arabia)	Saleh Al Abbas	1	0	1
Total					21	1	22

Last Updated: 31 May 2023

=== Clean sheets ===
Rank	No.	Pos	Nat	Name	Pro League	King Cup	Total
1	1	GK	(Brazil)	Douglas Friedrich	5	0	5
2	96	GK	(Saudi Arabia)	Marwan Al-Haidari	2	0	2
Total					7	0	7

Last Updated: 27 May 2023
