= Marcel Tisserand =

Footballer (born 1993)

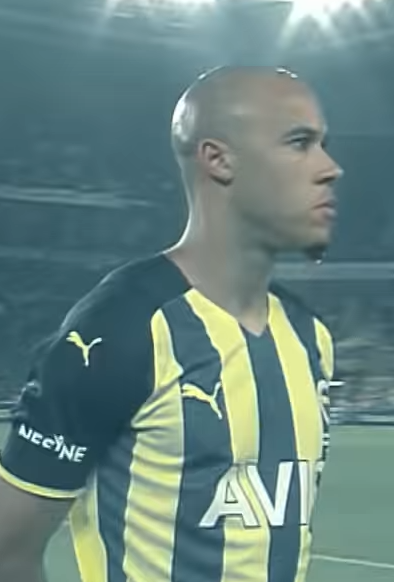
- Tisserand with Fenerbahçe in 2021

Personal information
- Full name: Marcel Jany Émile Tisserand
- Date of birth: 10 January 1993 (age 33)
- Place of birth: Meaux, France
- Height: 1.90 m (6 ft 3 in)
- Positions: Centre-back; right-back

Team information
- Current team: Sydney FC
- Number: 32

Youth career
- 2009–2013: Monaco

Senior career*
Years	Team	Apps	(Gls)
2011–2013	Monaco B	45	(4)
2013–2016	Monaco	7	(0)
2014	→ Lens (loan)	12	(1)
2014	→ Toulouse B (loan)	1	(0)
2014–2016	→ Toulouse (loan)	54	(1)
2016–2018	FC Ingolstadt	28	(0)
2017–2018	→ VfL Wolfsburg (loan)	16	(0)
2018–2020	VfL Wolfsburg	25	(2)
2020–2022	Fenerbahçe	44	(1)
2022–2025	Al-Ettifaq	42	(0)
2024	→ Abha (loan)	11	(0)
2024–2025	→ Al-Khaleej (loan)	21	(0)
2025–	Sydney FC	19	(2)

International career^{‡}
2012	DR Congo U19	1	(0)
2013	DR Congo U20	4	(0)
2016–	DR Congo	36	(0)
- * Club domestic league appearances and goals as of 26 April 2026 ‡ National team caps and goals as of 8 June 2022

Marcel Jany Émile Tisserand (French: [maʁsɛl ʒani emil tisəʁɑ̃]; born 10 January 1993) is a professional footballer who plays as a defender for Sydney FC in the A-League Men. Born in France, he represents the DR Congo national team.

== Club career ==
=== Monaco ===
Born in Meaux, France, Tisserand began his career at INF Clairefontaine before leaving for Monaco when he was thirteen.

In June 2013, he signed his first professional contract with Monaco, having spent four years at the reserve side. Following this, he was called up by the first team for the pre-season tour with Monaco by manager Claudio Ranieri. Ranieri was impressed with his ability in training and took him to the pre-season with the club. Tisserand made his professional debut at 10 August 2013 against Bordeaux in the first Ligue 1 game for AS Monaco in the 2013–14 season. On 5 October 2013, he made his first Monaco start, playing in the left–back position, in a 2–1 win over Saint-Étienne. On 19 December 2013, he signed a contract extension with the club, keeping him until 2018. However, he struggled in the first team, being relegated to the substitutes bench due to competition from Layvin Kurzawa and making six appearances in the 2013–14 season.

After ending his two–year loan spell at Toulouse, Tisserand returned to Monaco and expressed desire to play in the Monaco's first team in the 2016–17 season. In the 2016–17 season, he only made one appearance for the club, in a 1–0 win over Nantes on 20 August 2016.

==== Loan to Lens ====
After being told by the club's management that he was allowed to leave the club in the winter transfer window, Tisserand joined Ligue 2 side Lens on loan for the rest of the season on 20 January 2014. Upon joining Lens, he expressed hope the move would help him earn a first-team chance at Monaco next season.

Tisserand made his Lens debut on 27 January 2014, playing the full 90 minutes in a 2–1 win over Auxerre. On 8 March 2014, he scored his first professional goal in a 1–0 win over Metz. From that moment on, he became a first-team regular under Manager Antoine Kombouaré for the rest of the season going on to help the club achieve promotion to Ligue 2 (which was later invalidated). Despite setbacks from injury and suspension, Tisserand made a total of twelve appearances for the club, all of which were starts. At the end of the 2013–14 season, the club was keen on signing him on loan for a second time. However, they did not succeed in re-signing him citing financial problems.

==== Loan to Toulouse ====
Expecting to be loaned out again, Tisserand was loaned once again to fellow Ligue 1 side Toulouse in July 2014.

At the start of the season, he suffered an injury that ruled him out for several matches. In September, he returned to first-team training and made his Toulouse debut on 23 September 2014, starting in a 3–0 win over Rennes. At end of 2014, he suffered a further injury setback and at one point, was ineligible to play against his parent club, Monaco, despite request from Toulouse. After returning to the first team, Tisserand provided an assist for Aleksandar Pešić to score the only goal in 1–0 win against Reims on 31 January 2015. In a 3–2 loss against Metz on 4 April 2015, he was sent off for a second bookable offence and served one-match suspension as a result. Despite suffering setbacks towards the end of the season, Tisserand went on to make 22 appearances in all competitions in the 2014–15 season.

In the 2015–16 season, Monaco manager Leonardo Jardim stated he was keen on using Tisserand in the first team this season, due to his good performance in the previous season. On 21 July 2015, however, Tisserand was loaned out to Toulouse again for the season. He made his season debut in the opening game of the season, playing as a right–back in a 2–1 win over Saint-Étienne. He was sent off for a second bookable offence in the second half of a 3–0 win over Troyes on 2 December 2015, and was suspended for two matches. On 24 January 2016, Tisserand started against his parent club, Monaco, where he played for 67 minutes, in a 4–0 loss. He scored his first Toulouse goal on 23 April 2016, in a 3–2 loss against Lyon. Having become a first team regular in his second season at the club, Tisserand went on to make 36 appearances scoring once in all competitions.

Reflecting on his time at Toulouse, Tisserand credited Manager Pascal Dupraz for helping the side avoid relegation, where they finished 17th place.

=== Ingolstadt ===
On 31 August 2016, Tisserand signed a four-year contract with Bundesliga side Ingolstadt. The transfer fee paid to Monaco was reported as €5.5 million.

Tisserand made his Ingolstadt debut on 10 September 2016, making his first start, in a 2–0 loss against Hertha. Since then, he became a first team regular at Ingolstadt until he left for his international commitment. Following DR Congo's elimination in the Africa Cup of Nation, he returned to the first team on 11 February 2017, in a 2–0 loss against Bayern Munich. Following this, Tisserand continued to regain his first team place for the rest of the season. However, FC Ingolstadt 04 was relegated to 2.Bundesliga after drawing 1–1 against SC Freiburg on 13 May 2017, which he set up a goal for Maximilian Philipp to score the opener in the game. At the end of the 2016–17 season, Tisserand went on to make twenty–nine appearances in all competitions.

=== Wolfsburg ===
It was announced on 22 August 2017 that Wolfsburg signed Tisserland on a season–long loan deal for the rest of the 2017–18 season. It came after when FC Ingolstadt 04 dropped both him and Florent Hadergjonaj from the first team until the end of August.

Tisserand made his VfL Wolfsburg debut, starting the whole game, in a 1–0 win over Eintracht Frankfurt on 26 August 2017. However, he suffered a thigh injury that kept him out for two matches and didn't return until on 22 September 2017, starting the whole game, in a 2–2 draw against Bayern Munich. Since returning from injury, Tisserand regained his first team place, playing in the centre–back position under the management of Andries Jonker and performed impressively in a number of matches, especially in the left–back position. It was announced on 28 November 2017 that the club had taken up options to sign Tisserand on a permanent basis. Shortly after, Tisserand was sidelined with an illness and fitness that kept him out for three matches. It wasn't until on 16 December 2017 when he returned from the sidelines, coming on as a substitute in the second half, as they lost 1–0 against 1. FC Köln. Since returning from injury, Tisserand regained his first team place, playing in either the centre–back and left–back position throughout January. However, he tore his tendon and had to be substituted during a 2–1 loss against FC Schalke 04 in the quarter–final of the DFB-Pokal, resulting in him being sidelined for two months. It wasn't until on 20 April 2018 when Tisserand returned from injury, coming on as a substitute for John Brooks, in a 3–0 loss against Borussia Mönchengladbach. But his return was short–lived when he tore his tendon, ruling him out for the rest of the 2017–18 season. At the end of the season, he went on to make nineteen appearances in all competitions.

Tisserand remained on the sideline at the start of the 2018–19 season, as he continued to recover from his tendon injury. His first appearance of the season came on 5 October 2018, starting a match before coming off as a substitute in the 86th minute, in a 2–0 loss against Werder Bremen. Tisserand appeared four matches between 27 October 2018 and 9 November 2018, playing in the centre–back position. However, he suffered a thigh injury that saw him sidelined for months. It wasn't until on 13 April 2019 when Tisserand returned to the starting line-up, playing in the right–back position, as the club lost 2–0 against RB Leipzig. He regained his first team place, playing in the right–back position once before playing in the centre–back position for the remaining games of the 2018–19 season. Tisserand then scored his first goal for the club, in a 2–0 win over 1. FC Nürnberg on 4 May 2019. At the end of the 2018–19 season, he went on to make twelve appearances and scoring once in all competitions.

Ahead of the 2019–20 season, Tisserand was linked a move away from VfL Wolfsburg, as clubs, such as, Toulouse, Augusburg and Espanyol interested in signing him. But in the end, he stayed at the club. Having missed the start of the 2019–20 season, due to injury, Tisserand's first appearance of the season came on 13 September 2019, starting the whole game, in a 1–1 draw against Fortuna Düsseldorf. Since returning to the first team from injury, he quickly became a first team regular, playing in the centre–back position. Tisserand then scored his first goal of the season, in a 1–0 win over Mainz on 28 September 2019.

=== Fenerbahçe ===
On 15 September 2020 he joined Turkish side Fenerbahçe.

=== Al-Ettifaq ===
On 21 August 2022, Tisserand joined Saudi Arabian club Al-Ettifaq on a three-year deal.

==== Loan to Abha ====
On 30 January 2024, Tisserand joined Abha on a six-month loan.

==== Loan to Al-Khaleej ====
On 18 August 2024, Tisserand joined Al-Khaleej on a one-year loan.

=== Sydney FC ===
On 18 August 2025, Tisserand signed with Australian club Sydney FC on a two-year deal, to play in the A-League starting from the 2025–26 season. In round four of the 2025–26 A-League Men, Tisserand would score his first goal for the club (and his first in five years) in a 2–0 win over Macarthur FC.

== International career ==
While born in France to a French father and a Congolese mother, Tisserand represented Congo DR U19 in 2012 and was the captain of Congo DR U20 in the 2013 Toulon Tournament.

In March 2016, he was called up to the provisional squad of the senior DR Congo national team before being dropped due to administrative issues. Tisserand subsequently stated that he desired to play for the DR Congo. The following month, he debuted for the DR Congo in a friendly 1–1 tie with Romania in May 2016. The following January, Tisserand was called up to the squad for the Africa Cup of Nations. He played on match day 1 of the group stage, in a 1–0 win over Morocco on 16 April 2017. He went on to make five appearances in the tournament, as DR Congo were eliminated in the quarter–finals by Ghana. Two years later, Tisserand was called up to the DR Congo squad for the 2019 Africa Cup of Nations. He played all the matches, including being a captain against the tournament host, Egypt on 26 June 2019. However, DR Congo were eliminated from the tournament after losing to Madagascar in the Round of 16 of the African Cup of Nations.

== Personal life ==
Tisserand grew up in Meaux, France, and supported Paris Saint-Germain. He has an older brother, Patrick, who is also his agent, as well as two brothers, who are engineers, and a sister, who is an accountant.

In addition to speaking French, Tisserand speaks Lingala and understands Kongo language, something he learned from his grandmother. Since moving to Germany, he also speaks German, having taken lessons to learn the language.

== Career statistics ==
As of match played 26 April 2026

Appearances and goals by club, season and competition
Club	Season	League			National cup (Note: Includes Coupe de France, DFB-Pokal, Turkish Cup, King's Cup)		League cup (Note: Includes Coupe de la Ligue)		Continental		Total	
Club	Season	Division	Apps	Goals	Apps	Goals	Apps	Goals	Apps	Goals	Apps	Goals
Monaco	2013–14	Ligue 1	6	0	0	0	0	0	0	0	6	0
Monaco	2016–17	Ligue 1	1	0	0	0	0	0	0	0	1	0
Monaco	Total		7	0	0	0	0	0	0	0	7	0
Lens (loan)	2013–14	Ligue 2	12	1	1	0	0	0	–		13	1
Toulouse (loan)	2014–15	Ligue 1	21	0	1	0	2	0	–		24	0
Toulouse (loan)	2015–16	Ligue 1	33	1	1	0	0	0	–		34	1
Toulouse (loan)	Total		54	1	2	0	2	0	–		58	1
FC Ingolstadt	2016–17	Bundesliga	28	0	0	0	–		–		28	0
VfL Wolfsburg (loan)	2017–18	Bundesliga	16	0	3	0	–		–		19	0
VfL Wolfsburg	2018–19	Bundesliga	10	1	1	0	–		–		11	1
VfL Wolfsburg	2019–20	Bundesliga	15	1	1	0	–		7 (Note: Appearances in UEFA Europa League)	0	23	1
VfL Wolfsburg	Total		41	2	5	0	–		7	0	53	2
Fenerbahçe	2020–21	Süper Lig	25	1	0	0	–		–		25	1
Fenerbahçe	2021–22	Süper Lig	19	0	1	0	–		7 (Note: Five appearances in UEFA Europa League, two appearances in UEFA Europa Conference League)	0	27	0
Fenerbahçe	2022–23	Süper Lig	0	0	0	0	–		2 (Note: Appearances in UEFA Champions League)	0	2	0
Fenerbahçe	Total		44	1	1	0	–		9	0	54	1
Al-Ettifaq	2022–23	Saudi Pro League	27	0	1	0	–		–		28	0
Al-Ettifaq	2023–24	Saudi Pro League	15	0	2	0	–		–		17	0
Al-Ettifaq	Total		42	0	3	0	–		–		45	0
Abha (loan)	2023–24	Saudi Pro League	11	0	–		–		–		11	0
Al-Khaleej (loan)	2024–25	Saudi Pro League	21	0	1	0	–		–		22	0
Sydney FC	2025–26	A-League Men	19	2	0	0	–		–		19	2
Career total			279	7	13	0	2	0	16	0	310	7
