= Abdullah Al-Salem (footballer) =

Saudi Arabian footballer

Personal information
- Full name: Abdullah Al-Salem
- Date of birth: 19 December 1992 (age 33)
- Place of birth: Dammam, Saudi Arabia
- Height: 1.83 m (6 ft 0 in)
- Position: Second striker

Team information
- Current team: Al-Qadsiah
- Number: 9

Youth career
- Al-Khaleej

Senior career*
Years	Team	Apps	(Gls)
2010–2017	Al-Khaleej	70	(14)
2012–2013	→ Al-Ettifaq (loan)	1	(0)
2017–2019	Al-Fayha	27	(5)
2019	→ Al-Nassr (loan)	9	(0)
2020–2023	Al-Ettifaq FC	72	(8)
2023–2025	Al-Khaleej	67	(13)
2025–	Al-Qadsiah	28	(5)

International career^{‡}
2025–	Saudi Arabia	6	(1)
- * Club domestic league appearances and goals as of 29 October 2026 ‡ National team caps and goals as of 13 November 2026

Abdullah Al-Salem (Arabic: عبد الله آل سالم; born 19 December 1992) is a Saudi Arabian professional footballer who plays for Al-Qadsiah and the Saudi Arabia national team.

== Club career ==
On 17 June 2017, Al-Salem joined Al-Fayha following Al-Khaleej's relegation to the First Division. On 3 February 2019, Al Salem joined Al-Nassr on a six-month loan.

On 26 January 2020, Al-Salem joined Al-Ettifaq on a free transfer.

On 10 June 2023, Al Salem joined Al-Khaleej on a free transfer.

On 11 June 2025, Al Salem joined Al-Qadsiah.

== International career ==
In March 2025, at the age of 32, Al-Salem received his first call-up to the Saudi Arabia national team for the 2026 FIFA World Cup qualification games against China and Japan.

== Career statistics ==
=== Club ===
As of match played 26 May 2025

Appearances and goals by club, season and competition
Club	Season	League			King's Cup		Continental		Other		Total	
Club	Season	Division	Apps	Goals	Apps	Goals	Apps	Goals	Apps	Goals	Apps	Goals
Al-Khaleej	2014–15	Saudi Pro League	24	6	1	1	–		4 (Note: Appearances in Saudi Crown Prince Cup)	0	29	7
Al-Khaleej	2015–16	Saudi Pro League	22	2	2	2	–		3	2	27	6
Al-Khaleej	2016–17	Saudi Pro League	25	6	2	2	–		2	1	29	9
Al-Khaleej	Total		71	14	5	5	–		9	3	85	22
Al-Fayha	2017–18	Saudi Pro League	16	2	2	1	–		1	0	19	3
Al-Fayha	2018–19	Saudi Pro League	11	3	3	2	–		–		14	5
Al-Fayha	Total		27	5	5	3	–		1	0	33	8
Al-Nassr (loan)	2018–19	Saudi Pro League	9	0	0	0	7 (Note: Appearances in AFC Champions League)	2	0	0	16	2
Al-Ettifaq	2019–20	Saudi Pro League	10	2	0	0	–		–		10	2
Al-Ettifaq	2020–21	Saudi Pro League	21	2	1	0	–		–		22	2
Al-Ettifaq	2021–22	Saudi Pro League	20	3	1	0	–		–		21	3
Al-Ettifaq	2022–23	Saudi Pro League	21	1	0	0	–		–		21	1
Al-Ettifaq	Total		72	8	2	0	–		–		74	8
Al-Khaleej	2023–24	Saudi Pro League	34	3	3	0	–		–		37	3
Al-Khaleej	2024–25	Saudi Pro League	33	10	1	1	–		–		34	11
Al-Khaleej	Total		67	13	4	1	–		–		71	14
Al-Qadsiah	2025–26	Saudi Pro League	0	0	0	0	–		0	0	0	0
Career total			246	40	16	9	7	2	10	3	279	54

== International goals ==
No.	Date	Venue	Opponent	Score	Result	Competition
1.	29 September 2026	King Abdullah Sports City Stadium, Jeddah, Saudi Arabia	Iraq	1–0	2–0	27th Arabian Gulf Cup

== Honours ==
Al-Nassr

- Saudi Pro League: 2018–19
