= Niromar =

Brazilian footballer

Personal information
- Full name: Niromar Martins Campos
- Date of birth: 11 November 1953 (age 73)
- Place of birth: Rio de Janeiro, Brazil
- Position: Forward

Senior career*
Years	Team	Apps	(Gls)
1978–1980	Beira-Mar	53	(14)
1980–1983	Porto	13	(3)
1981–1982	→ Sanjoanense (loan)	0	(0)
1983–1984	Portimonense	10	(0)
1984–1985	Estrela da Amadora	30	(4)
1985–1987	S.C. Covilhã	37	(1)
1987–1988	Lousada		
1988–1989	Campomaiorense		
- * Club domestic league appearances and goals

Niromar Martins Campos (born 11 November 1953) is a Portuguese-Brazilian former professional footballer who played as a forward for various clubs, including Porto.

He is the father of Portuguese footballer Fábio Martins.
