= Hamad Al-Abdan =

Saudi Arabian footballer (born 2000)

Hamad Al-Abdan حمد العبدان
Personal information
- Full name: Hamad Abdan Al-Abdan
- Date of birth: 26 May 2000 (age 26)
- Place of birth: Al Majma'ah, Saudi Arabia
- Height: 1.75 m (5 ft 9 in)
- Position: Midfielder

Team information
- Current team: Abha
- Number: 93

Youth career
- Al-Hilal

Senior career*
Years	Team	Apps	(Gls)
2020–2023	Al-Hilal	3	(0)
2021–2022	→ Al-Hazem (loan)	9	(0)
2022–2023	→ Al-Khaleej (loan)	23	(1)
2023–2024	Al-Khaleej	7	(0)
2025–	Abha	0	(0)

International career
2015–2016	Saudi Arabia U17		
2017–2019	Saudi Arabia U20		
- * Club domestic league appearances and goals as of 12 April 2023

Hamad Al-Abdan (Arabic: حمد العبدان; born 26 May 2000) is a Saudi Arabian professional footballer who plays as a midfielder for Abha.

== Career ==
Al-Abdan started his career at the youth team of Al-Hilal and has represented the club at every level. He signed his first professional contract with the club on 25 July 2020. On 17 August 2021, Al-Abdan joined Al-Hazem on loan. On 28 August 2022, Al-Abdan joined Al-Khaleej on loan. On 19 June 2023, Al-Abdan joined Al-Khaleej on a free transfer.

On 1 February 2025, Al-Abdan joined Abha.

== Career statistics ==
=== Club ===
As of 27 May 2024.

Club	Season	League			Cup		Continental		Other		Total	
Club	Season	Division	Apps	Goals	Apps	Goals	Apps	Goals	Apps	Goals	Apps	Goals
Al-Hilal	2020–21	Pro League	3	0	0	0	0	0	—		3	0
Al-Hazem (loan)	2021–22	Pro League	9	0	1	0	—		—		10	0
Al-Khaleej (loan)	2022–23	Pro League	23	1	1	0	—		—		24	1
Al-Khaleej	2023–24	Pro League	7	0	0	0	—		—		7	0
Al-Khaleej	Total		30	1	1	0	0	0	0	0	31	1
Career totals			42	1	2	0	0	0	0	0	44	1

== Honours ==
=== Al-Hilal ===
- Saudi Professional League: 2020–21
- Kings Cup: 2019–20
