= Başiskele =

- District and municipality
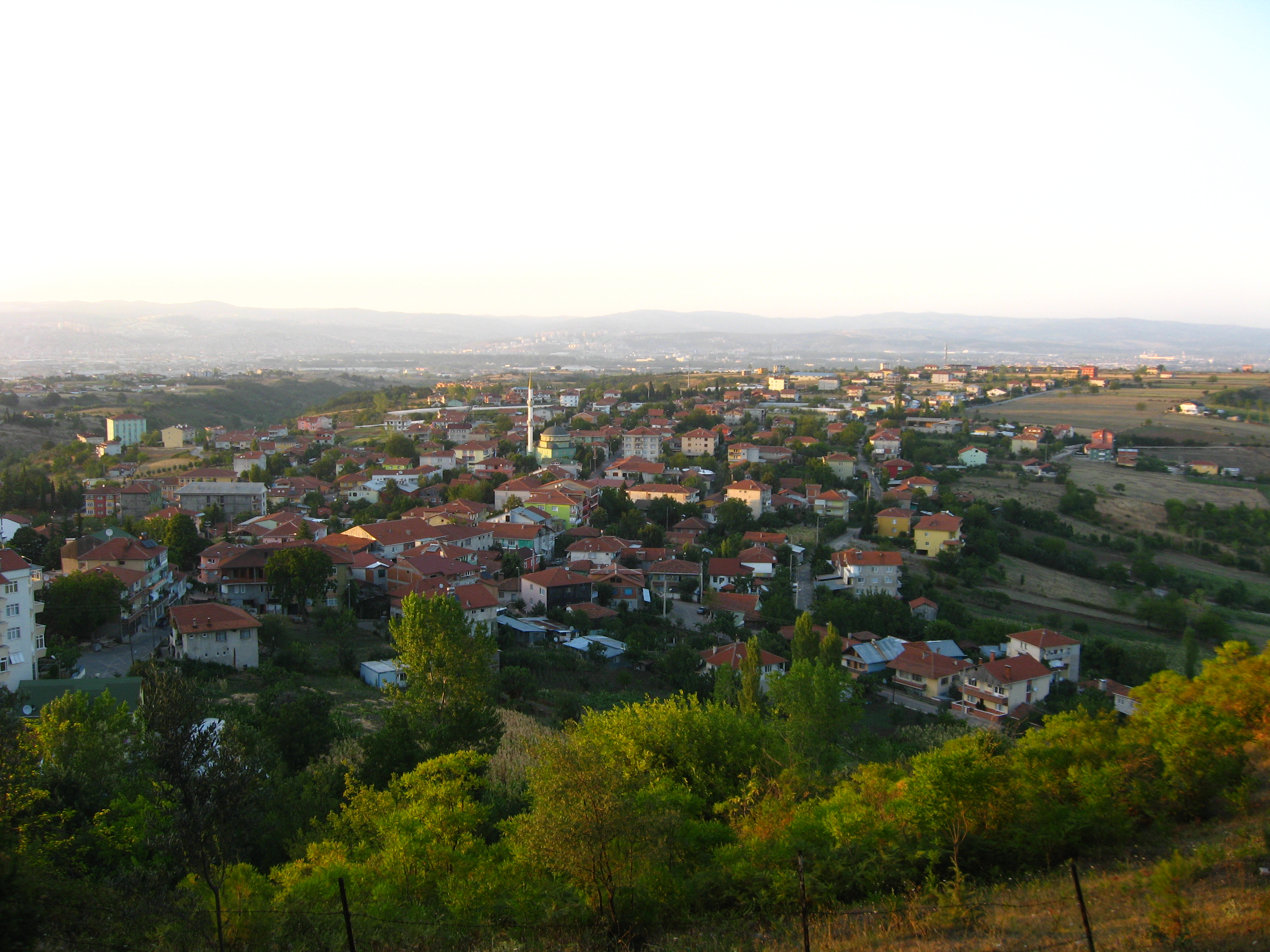
- General view of Başiskele

- Logo

- Map showing Başiskele District in Kocaeli Province

- Location within Turkey Location within Marmara
- Coordinates: 40°41′N 30°31′E
- Country: Turkey
- Province: Kocaeli

Government
  - Mayor: Mehmet Yasin Özlü (AK Party)
- Area: 209 km^{2} (81 sq mi)
- Population (2022): 116,650
  - Density: 558/km^{2} (1,450/sq mi)
- Time zone: UTC+3 (TRT)
- Area code: 0262
- Website: www.basiskele.bel.tr

Başiskele, formerly known as Astacus, is a municipality and district of Kocaeli Province, Turkey. Its area is 23 km^{2}, and its population is 116,650 (2022). The mayor is Hüseyin Ayaz (AK Party).

== History ==
Formerly known as Astacus or Astakós in antiquity, Başiskele is a relatively new district, constituted in 2008. The municipality of Başiskele, which covers the whole area of the district, is a merger of the former independent municipalities of Kullar, Yeniköy, Bahçecik, Karşıyaka (before named Döngel) and Yuvacık. The name "Baş İskele" (Head Quay") was previously the name of a neighborhood close to the coast of the Sea of Marmara that was already known by that name in the 16th century.

== Neighbourhoods ==
Neighbourhoods (mahalle) are small administrative units within the municipalities, and are administered by the muhtar and the Neighbourhood Seniors Council consisting of 4 members. Muhtar and the Senior Council are elected for 5 years at the local elections and are not affiliated with political parties. Neighbourhoods are not an incorporation therefore do not hold government status. Muhtar, although being elected by the residents, acts merely as an administrator of the district governor. Muhtar can voice the neighbourhood issues to the municipal hall together with the Seniors Council.

There are 37 neighbourhoods in Başiskele District:

- Aksığın
- Altınkent
- Atakent
- Aydınkent
- Barbaros
- Camidüzü
- Damlar
- Doğantepe
- Döngel
- Fatih
- Havuzlubahçe
- Karadenizliler
- Karşıyaka
- Kazandere
- Kılıçaslan
- Körfez
- Kullar Tepecik
- Kullaryakacık
- Mahmutpaşa
- Mehmetağa
- Ovacık
- Paşadağ
- Sahil
- Şehitekrem
- Sepetlipınar
- Serdar
- Serindere
- Servetiyecami
- Servetiyekarşı
- Seymen
- Tepecik
- Vezirçiftliği
- Yaylacık
- Yeniköymerkez
- Yeşilkent
- Yeşilyurt
- Yuvacıkyakacık
