= Mohammed Al-Abdullah =

Qatari footballer (born 1990)

Mohammed Al-Abdullah محمد العبد الله
Personal information
- Full name: Mohammed Said Muftah Al-Abdullah
- Date of birth: 9 January 1990 (age 36)
- Place of birth: Qatar
- Position: Midfielder

Youth career
- Al-Rayyan

Senior career*
Years	Team	Apps	(Gls)
2009–2014	Al-Rayyan		
2014–2016	El Jaish		
2016–2017	Al-Kharaitiyat		
2017–2019	Al-Shamal		
2019–2021	Lusail		
- * Club domestic league appearances and goals

Saoud Al-Ali (Arabic: محمد العبد الله) (born 9 January 1990) is a Qatari footballer. He currently plays as a midfielder.

== Career ==
He formerly played for Al-Rayyan, El Jaish, Al-Kharaitiyat, Al-Shamal, and Lusail .
