= Mohammed Al-Khabrani =

Saudi Arabian footballer (born 1993)

Mohammed al-Khabrani
Personal information
- Full name: Mohammed Abdoh Al-Khabrani
- Date of birth: 14 October 1993 (age 33)
- Place of birth: Khobar, Saudi Arabia
- Height: 1.85 m (6 ft 1 in)
- Position: Center-back

Team information
- Current team: Al-Khaleej
- Number: 3

Youth career
- Al-Qadsiah

Senior career*
Years	Team	Apps	(Gls)
2013–2019	Al-Qadsiah	140	(2)
2019–2022	Al-Ahli	63	(0)
2022–	Al-Khaleej	53	(0)

International career^{‡}
2017–	Saudi Arabia	17	(2)
- * Club domestic league appearances and goals as of 18 April 2024 ‡ National team caps and goals as of 22:02, 15 June 2021 (UTC)

Mohammed Abdoh Al-Khabrani (Arabic: محمد عبده الخبراني, born 14 October 1993) is a Saudi Arabian football player who plays as a center-back for Pro League side Al-Khaleej and the Saudi Arabia national team.

== Career statistics ==
=== Club ===
As of match played 30 May 2024

Appearances and goals by club, season and competition
Club	Season	League			King Cup		Crown Prince Cup		Asia		Other		Total	
Club	Season	Division	Apps	Goals	Apps	Goals	Apps	Goals	Apps	Goals	Apps	Goals	Apps	Goals
Al-Qadsiah	2013–14	First Division	25	0	1	0	1	0	—		—		27	0
Al-Qadsiah	2014–15	First Division	21	1	2	0	2	0	—		—		25	1
Al-Qadsiah	2015–16	Pro League	24	0	1	0	3	0	—		—		28	0
Al-Qadsiah	2016–17	Pro League	24	1	1	0	2	0	—		—		27	1
Al-Qadsiah	2017–18	Pro League	20	0	2	0	0	0	—		—		22	0
Al-Qadsiah	2018–19	Pro League	26	0	0	0	—		—		—		26	0
Al-Qadsiah	Total		140	2	7	0	8	0	0	0	0	0	155	2
Al-Ahli	2019–20	Pro League	22	0	3	0	—		3	0	—		28	0
Al-Ahli	2020–21	Pro League	17	0	2	0	—		3	0	—		22	0
Al-Ahli	2021–22	Pro League	24	0	1	0	—		—		—		25	0
Al-Ahli	Total		63	0	6	0	0	0	6	0	0	0	75	0
Al-Khaleej	2022–23	Pro League	26	0	1	0	—		—		—		27	0
Al-Khaleej	2023–24	Pro League	27	0	3	0	—		—		—		30	0
Al-Khaleej	Total		53	0	4	0	0	0	0	0	0	0	57	0
Career total			256	2	17	0	8	0	6	0	0	0	287	2

=== International ===
Statistics accurate as of match played 15 June 2021.

Team	Year	Apps	Goals
Saudi Arabia
Saudi Arabia	2017	5	0
Saudi Arabia	2019	9	2
Saudi Arabia	2020	1	0
Saudi Arabia	2021	2	0
Saudi Arabia	Total	17	2

=== International goals ===
Scores and results list Saudi Arabia's goal tally first.

No.	Date	Venue	Opponent	Score	Result	Competition
1.	25 March 2019	King Fahd International Stadium, Riyadh, Saudi Arabia	Equatorial Guinea	3–1	3–2	Friendly
2.	30 November 2019	Abdullah bin Khalifa Stadium, Doha, Qatar	Bahrain	2–0	2–0	24th Arabian Gulf Cup

== Honours ==
Al-Qadsiah

- First Division: 2014–15
