= Abdallah Khaled =

Yemeni footballer (born 1998)

Abdallah Khaled عبد الله خالد
Personal information
- Full name: Abdallah Khaled Sheikh Al-Keldi Al-Yafei
- Date of birth: 10 April 1998 (age 28)
- Place of birth: Yemen
- Position: Forward

Team information
- Current team: Umm Salal
- Number: 18

Youth career
- Umm Salal

Senior career*
Years	Team	Apps	(Gls)
2018–	Umm Salal	22	(2)
2020	→ Muaither (loan)		
- * Club domestic league appearances and goals as of 17 January 2026

Abdallah Khaled Sheikh (Arabic: عبد الله خالد شيخ; born 10 April 1998) is a Yemeni professional footballer who plays as a forward for Qatar Stars League side Umm Salal.
