= Naif Masoud =

Saudi Arabian footballer (born 2001)

Personal information
- Full name: Naif Khaled Rashid Mubarak Masoud
- Date of birth: 8 March 2001 (age 25)
- Place of birth: Khobar, Saudi Arabia
- Height: 1.77 m (5 ft 10 in)
- Position: Defensive midfielder

Team information
- Current team: Al-Ahli
- Number: 66

Youth career
- 2017–2020: Al-Qadsiah

Senior career*
Years	Team	Apps	(Gls)
2020–2024	Al-Qadsiah	2	(0)
2024	→ Al-Khaleej (loan)	11	(0)
2024–2026	Al-Fateh	36	(1)
2026–	Al-Ahli	5	(1)

International career^{‡}
2022–2023	Saudi Arabia U23	5	(1)
2023–	Saudi Arabia	5	(0)
- * Club domestic league appearances and goals as of 8 September 2026 ‡ National team caps and goals as of 31 March 2026

Naif Masoud (Arabic: نايف مسعود; born 8 March 2001) is a Saudi Arabian professional football player who plays as a defensive midfielder for Al-Ahli and the Saudi Arabia national team.

== Club career ==
On 9 October 2017, Masoud started his career at the youth academy of Al-Qadsiah. he reached the first team in the 2020–2021 season. On 31 January 2024, Masoud joined Al-Khaleej on a sex-month loan. On 29 August 2024, he joined Al-Fateh for four-years deal.

== International career ==
He was called up to the Saudi Arabia U23 to participate in 2022 WAFF U-23 Championship. He was called up to the Saudi Arabia to participate in 25th Arabian Gulf Cup.
