= Hisham Al Dubais =

Saudi Arabian footballer

Personal information
- Full name: Hisham Hussain Al Dubais
- Date of birth: 26 September 2001 (age 25)
- Place of birth: Saihat, Saudi Arabia
- Height: 1.72 m (5 ft 7 1/2 in)
- Position: Striker

Team information
- Current team: Al-Najma (on loan from Al-Shabab)
- Number: 77

Youth career
- Al-Khaleej

Senior career*
Years	Team	Apps	(Gls)
2020–2025	Al-Khaleej	66	(6)
2023	→ Al-Sahel (loan)	14	(3)
2023–2024	→ Al-Jabalain (loan)	25	(13)
2025–	Al-Shabab	11	(0)
2025–	→ Al-Najma (loan)	19	(0)

International career^{‡}
2019	Saudi Arabia U20		
2023	Saudi Arabia U23		
- * Club domestic league appearances and goals as of 23:15, 22 August 2025 (UTC) ‡ National team caps and goals as of 21 November 2023

Hisham Al Dubais (Arabic: هشام آل دبيس; born 26 September 2001) is a Saudi Arabian professional footballer who plays as a striker for Al-Najma on loan from Al-Shabab.

== Club career ==
Al Dubais began his career at the youth teams of Al-Khaleej. He made his debut during the 2019–20 season, making 16 appearances and scoring once against Al-Bukiryah. During the 2021–22 season, Al Dubais made 12 appearances helping Al-Khaleej win the First Division League title and earn promotion to the Pro League. On 25 August 2022, Al Dubais made his Pro League debut in the 2–0 defeat to Al-Hilal. On 29 January 2023, Al Dubais joined Al-Sahel on a six-month loan. He ended his loan spell at Al-Sahel scoring 3 goals in 14 appearances. On 12 August 2023, Al Dubais scored his first Pro League in a 3–1 defeat to Al-Fayha. On 5 September 2023, Al Dubais First Division side joined Al-Jabalain on a one-year loan. He finished as Al-Jabalain's top scorer, scoring 13 goals in 25 appearances. On 1 January 2025, Al Dubais joined Al-Shabab on a free transfer. On 10 September 2025, Al Dubais joined Al-Najma on loan.

== Honours ==
Al-Khaleej

- First Division: 2021–22
