= Fábio Martins =

Portuguese footballer

Personal information
- Full name: Fábio Santos Martins
- Date of birth: 24 July 1993 (age 33)
- Place of birth: Mafamude, Portugal
- Height: 1.78 m (5 ft 10 in)
- Position: Winger

Youth career
- 2001–2012: Porto
- 2008–2009: → Padroense (loan)

Senior career*
Years	Team	Apps	(Gls)
2012–2013	Porto B	29	(2)
2013–2014	Aves	33	(3)
2014–2015	Braga B	41	(14)
2015–2021	Braga	45	(6)
2015–2016	→ Paços Ferreira (loan)	18	(0)
2016–2017	→ Chaves (loan)	29	(6)
2019–2020	→ Famalicão (loan)	29	(12)
2020–2021	→ Al Shabab (loan)	26	(9)
2021–2022	Al Wahda	21	(9)
2023–2025	Al-Khaleej	78	(21)
2025–2026	Al-Hazem	33	(5)

International career
2009	Portugal U16	3	(0)
2009	Portugal U17	3	(0)
2010–2011	Portugal U18	9	(2)
2011–2012	Portugal U19	7	(3)
2013	Portugal U20	5	(0)
2013	Portugal U21	1	(0)
- * Club domestic league appearances and goals as of 13:50, 12 August 2026 (UTC)

Fábio Santos Martins (Portuguese pronunciation: [ˈfaβju mɐɾˈtĩʃ]; born 24 July 1993) is a Portuguese professional footballer who plays as a winger.

He made over 100 appearances and scored over 20 goals in both the Primeira Liga and Segunda Liga, representing four clubs in the former and three in the latter. He all but spent his later career in the Saudi Pro League.

== Club career ==
Born in Mafamude, Vila Nova de Gaia to Brazilian footballer Niromar (who played several years in Portugal in the same position), Martins spent most of his youth career at FC Porto. He played one season with their reserves in the Segunda Liga, his first match in the competition occurring on 12 August 2012 when he featured 86 minutes in a 2–2 away draw against C.D. Tondela.

On 27 August 2013, free agent Martins signed with C.D. Aves also in the second division. He spent the 2014–15 campaign with S.C. Braga B in the same league, scoring a career-best 14 goals to help to a final 21st position (still above the relegation zone); it was with the first team of the latter that he first appeared in the Primeira Liga, coming on as a late substitute in the 2–0 home victory over F.C. Arouca on 15 February 2015.

Martins was loaned to F.C. Paços de Ferreira prior to the start of 2015–16. After featuring sparingly, he joined G.D. Chaves in the same situation, netting six times in the league including once in a 2–2 home draw to Sporting CP after a 30-meter chip that caught Rui Patrício off-guard.

On 25 October 2017, Martins renewed his contract with Braga until 2022, with the new buyout clause being set at €25 million. He contributed five goals from 27 appearances – ten starts – during the season, which qualified for the UEFA Europa League after the fourth-place finish.

On 22 June 2019, still owned by Braga, Martins moved to newly promoted F.C. Famalicão for the upcoming top-flight campaign. He was top scorer for the sixth-placed side during his spell, being sent off against Aves and C.S. Marítimo.

Martins was loaned to Al Shabab FC on 25 September 2020, as the Saudi Professional League club was coached by his compatriot Pedro Caixinha. A year later, he signed a two-year deal for Al Wahda FC in the UAE Pro League, for €3 million.

On 23 December 2022, Martins returned to the Saudi top tier with Al-Khaleej FC on a free transfer. He scored seven league goals in each of his three seasons, going on total 83 games and nine assists.

In August 2025, again for free, Martins joined Al-Hazem F.C. of the same country and division.

== International career ==
All categories comprised, Martins won 28 caps for Portugal at youth level and scored five goals. His only for the under-21s came on 2 June 2013, when he started the 2–0 friendly defeat of Croatia held in Rio Maior.

== Career statistics ==
As of 27 May 2024

Appearances and goals by club, season and competition
Club	Season	League		National cup		League cup		Europe		Other		Total	
Club	Season	Apps	Goals	Apps	Goals	Apps	Goals	Apps	Goals	Apps	Goals	Apps	Goals
Porto B	2012–13	29	2	—		—		—		—		29	2
Aves	2013–14	33	3	2	0	0	0	—		2 (Note: Appearances in Primeira Liga promotion play-offs)	1	37	4
Braga B	2014–15	41	14	—		—		—		—		41	14
Braga	2014–15	1	0	0	0	1	1	0	0	—		2	1
Braga	2017–18	27	5	2	1	4	1	7 (Note: Appearances in UEFA Europa League)	0	—		40	7
Braga	2018–19	11	0	1	0	2	1	1	0	—		14	1
Braga	2021–22	6	1	0	0	0	0	1	0	—		7	1
Braga	Total	45	6	3	1	7	3	9	0	0	0	64	10
Paços Ferreira (loan)	2015–16	18	0	2	0	4	1	—		—		24	1
Chaves (loan)	2016–17	29	6	6	1	1	1	—		—		36	8
Famalicão (loan)	2019–20	29	12	5	0	1	0	—		—		35	12
Al Shabab (loan)	2020–21	26	9	1	0	—		—		1 (Note: Appearance in Arab Club Champions Cup)	1	28	10
Al Wahda	2020–21	18	9	0	0	—		—		0	0	18	9
Al Wahda	2021–22	3	0	0	0	4	0	0	0	—		7	0
Al Wahda	Total	21	9	0	0	4	0	0	0	0	0	25	9
Al-Khaleej	2022–23	17	7	0	0	—		—		0	0	17	7
Al-Khaleej	2023–24	29	7	4	1	0	0	0	0	—		33	8
Al-Khaleej	Total	46	14	4	1	0	0	0	0	0	0	50	15
Career total		317	75	23	3	17	5	9	0	3	2	369	85

== Honours ==
Individual

- Primeira Liga Player of the Month: September 2019
- Primeira Liga Forward of the Month: September 2019
