= 2017–18 Ettifaq FC season =

Al-Ettifaq
2017–18 season
- President: Khalid Al Dabal
- Manager: Miodrag Ješić (until 10 December 2017); Saad Al-Shehri (from 10 December 2017)
- Stadium: Prince Mohamed bin Fahd Stadium
- SPL: 4th
- King Cup: Round of 16
- Top goalscorer: League: Hazaa Al-Hazaa (7); All: Hazaa Al-Hazaa (7)
- Highest home attendance: 14,618 vs Al-Hilal (9 March 2018)
- Lowest home attendance: 503 vs Al-Batin (14 October 2017)
- Average home league attendance: 3,090
Home colours	Away colours	Third colours
- All statistics correct as of 12 April 2018.

The 2017–18 season was Al-Ettifaq's 73rd season in existence and their second consecutive in the Pro League. Along with the Pro League, the club also competed in the King Cup.

The season covered the period from 1 July 2017 to 30 June 2018.

== Players ==
=== Squad information ===
As of 31 January 2018

Note: Flags indicate national team as defined under FIFA eligibility rules; some limited exceptions apply. Players may hold more than one non-FIFA nationality.

No.	Pos.	Nation	Player
2	DF	KSA	Omar Al-Sonain
3	DF	KSA	Abdulelah Bokhari
4	DF	IRQ	Ahmad Ibrahim
6	MF	KSA	Yahya Otain
7	MF	KSA	Mohammed Al-Kwikbi
8	MF	KSA	Osama Al-Khalaf
9	FW	KSA	Hazaa Al-Hazaa
10	MF	KSA	Hassan Al-Habib
11	MF	KSA	Ali Hazazi
12	DF	KSA	Mohammed Al-Zubaidi
13	DF	KSA	Osama Al-Saleem
14	MF	SVK	Filip Kiss
16	FW	KSA	Yousef Al-Salem
17	FW	KSA	Nawaf Bouamer
18	MF	KSA	Fawaz Al-Torais
22	MF	EGY	Ahmed El Sheikh (on loan from Al Ahly)
23	MF	SOM	Liban Abdi

No.	Pos.	Nation	Player
24	MF	KSA	Abdurahman Al-Aboud
25	MF	KSA	Talal Majrashi (on loan from Al-Fayha)
28	GK	KSA	Ahmed Al-Kassar
29	MF	KSA	Mohammad Al-Subaie
30	GK	KSA	Abdullah Al-Saleh
33	DF	EGY	Hussein El Sayed (on loan from Al Ahly)
34	DF	KSA	Ali Al-Khaibari
40	MF	KSA	Ibrahim Mahnashi
47	MF	KSA	Ahmed Al-Dohaim
50	DF	KSA	Saad Al-Khairi
51	DF	KSA	Majed Al-Khaibari (on loan from Al-Ittihad)
70	FW	KSA	Mohammed Al-Saiari
77	DF	KSA	Ahmed Al-Habib
80	MF	KSA	Hamed Al-Ghamdi
88	MF	KSA	Saad Al-Selouli
92	GK	ALG	Raïs M'Bolhi
99	MF	TUN	Fakhreddine Ben Youssef

=== Out on loan ===
Note: Flags indicate national team as defined under FIFA eligibility rules; some limited exceptions apply. Players may hold more than one non-FIFA nationality.

No.	Pos.	Nation	Player
20	MF	KSA	Abdulaziz Majrashi (at Al-Fayha until 30 June 2018)
32	GK	KSA	Abdullah Al Bahri (at Al-Kawkab until 30 June 2018)
35	GK	KSA	Mohammed Al-Haiti (at Al-Hazm until 30 June 2018)

No.	Pos.	Nation	Player
—	MF	KSA	Jaber Al-Ziyadi (at Al-Nahda until 30 June 2018)
—	MF	KSA	Hassan Gazwani (at Al-Nahda until 30 June 2018)

== Transfers ==
=== In ===
==== Summer ====
No.	Pos	Player	Transferred From	Fee	Date	Source
4	CB	(Iraq) Ahmed Khalaf	(United Arab Emirates) Emirates	Free	27 June 2017	
11	AM	(Saudi Arabia) Ali Hazazi	(Saudi Arabia) Al-Qadsiah	Free	4 July 2017	
34	CB	(Saudi Arabia) Ali Al-Khaibari	(Saudi Arabia) Al-Nassr	Free	9 July 2017	
14	CM	(Slovakia) Filip Kiss	(Norway) Haugesund	Undisclosed	24 July 2017	
3	LB	(Saudi Arabia) Abdulelah Bokhari	(Saudi Arabia) Al-Ahli	Free	30 July 2017	
77	CB	(Saudi Arabia) Ahmed Al-Habib	(Saudi Arabia) Al-Raed	Free	10 August 2017	
19	ST	(Argentina) Rodrigo Salinas	(Argentina) Chacarita Juniors	Free	14 August 2017	

==== Winter ====
No.	Pos	Player	Transferred From	Fee	Date	Source
23	LM	(Somalia) Liban Abdi	(Norway) Haugesund	Free	1 January 2018	
1	GK	(Jordan) Ahmed Abdel-Sattar	(Jordan) Al-Jazeera	Free	2 January 2018	
92	GK	(Algeria) Raïs M'Bolhi	(France) Stade Rennais	Free	18 January 2018	
99	RM	(Tunisia) Fakhreddine Ben Youssef	(Tunisia) ES Tunis	Free	30 January 2018	
	CB	(Saudi Arabia) Faisal Abu Baker	Unattached	Free	30 January 2018	

=== Out ===
==== Summer ====
No.	Pos	Player	Transferred To	Fee	Date	Source
26	LM	(Saudi Arabia) Ali Al-Zaqaan	(Saudi Arabia) Al-Fateh	Free	5 June 2017	
90	LM	(Saudi Arabia) Khaled Al-Aboud	(Saudi Arabia) Hajer	Free	19 June 2017	
1	GK	(Saudi Arabia) Osama Al-Hamdan	(Saudi Arabia) Al-Nahda	Free	22 June 2017	
24	CB	(Saudi Arabia) Jamaan Al-Dossari	(Saudi Arabia) Al-Shabab	Free	27 June 2017	
3	CB	(Cameroon) Aminou Bouba		Released	30 June 2017	
18	DM	(Saudi Arabia) Abdulaziz Al-Nashi		Released	30 June 2017	
40	ST	(Nigeria) Michael Eneramo		Released	30 June 2017	
13	LB	(Saudi Arabia) Hassan Kadesh	(Saudi Arabia) Al-Hilal	Undisclosed	3 July 2017	
8	AM	(Saudi Arabia) Mohamed Kanno	(Saudi Arabia) Al-Hilal	Undisclosed	3 July 2017	
15	LM	(Saudi Arabia) Nasser Al-Abdeli		Released	15 July 2017	
5	CB	(Saudi Arabia) Mortadha Al-Breh	(Saudi Arabia) Al-Watani	Free	15 July 2017	
10	AM	(Saudi Arabia) Aiedh Al-Sohaimi	(Saudi Arabia) Al-Nahda	Free	6 August 2017	
15	LM	(Spain) Juanmi Callejón		Released	28 December 2017	

==== Winter ====
No.	Pos	Player	Transferred To	Fee	Date	Source
19	ST	(Argentina) Rodrigo Salinas	(Argentina) Vélez Sarsfield	Free	16 January 2018	
1	GK	(Jordan) Ahmed Abdel-Sattar	(Jordan) Al-Jazeera	Free	17 January 2018	
5	CB	(Kuwait) Fahed Al Hajri		Released	31 January 2018	
27	LB	(Saudi Arabia) Abdulaziz Waseli	(Saudi Arabia) Al-Nojoom	Free	24 February 2018	

=== Loan in ===
==== Summer ====
No.	Pos	Player	Loaned From	Start	End	Source
5	CB	(Kuwait) Fahed Al Hajri	Kuwait	26 June 2017	31 January 2018	
51	LB	(Saudi Arabia) Majed Al-Khaibari	(Saudi Arabia) Al-Ittihad	13 July 2017	30 June 2018	

==== Winter ====
No.	Pos	Player	Loaned From	Start	End	Source
22	AM	(Egypt) Ahmed El Sheikh	(Egypt) Al Ahly	3 January 2018	30 June 2018	
25	RM	(Saudi Arabia) Talal Majrashi	(Saudi Arabia) Al-Fayha	21 January 2018	30 June 2018	
33	LB	(Egypt) Hussein El Sayed	(Egypt) Al Ahly	31 January 2018	30 June 2018	

=== Loan out ===
==== Summer ====
No.	Pos	Player	Loaned To	Start	End	Source
20	ST	(Saudi Arabia) Jaber Al-Ziyadi	(Saudi Arabia) Al-Nahda	6 August 2017	30 June 2018	
	AM	(Saudi Arabia) Hassan Gazwani	(Saudi Arabia) Al-Nahda	6 August 2017	30 June 2018	
32	GK	(Saudi Arabia) Abdullah Al Bahri	(Saudi Arabia) Al-Kawkab	16 August 2017	30 June 2018	

==== Winter ====
No.	Pos	Player	Loaned To	Start	End	Source
	AM	(Saudi Arabia) Khaled Al-Hamdhi	(Saudi Arabia) Al-Khaleej	15 January 2018	30 June 2018	
35	GK	(Saudi Arabia) Mohammed Al-Haiti	(Saudi Arabia) Al-Hazm	31 January 2018	30 June 2018	
20	DM	(Saudi Arabia) Abdulaziz Majrashi	(Saudi Arabia) Al-Fayha	31 January 2018	30 June 2018	

== Pre-season friendlies ==
12 July 2017 Friendly	Al-Ettifaq (Saudi Arabia)	1–1	(Netherlands) Fortuna Sittard	Istanbul, Turkey
16:30 FET	Al-Salem 5'	Report	79' (pen.)

15 July 2017 Friendly	Al-Ettifaq (Saudi Arabia)	1–1	Oman Olympic	Istanbul, Turkey
16:30 FET	Al-Sobeai 57'	Report	75'

20 July 2017 Friendly	Al-Ettifaq (Saudi Arabia)	4–1	(Azerbaijan) Səbail	Istanbul, Turkey
16:30 FET	Al-Kwikbi 29'; Al-Torais 60', 64'; Al-Khaibari 86'	Report	66'

25 July 2017 Friendly	Al-Ettifaq (Saudi Arabia)	1–0	(Jordan) Al-Jazeera	Istanbul, Turkey
16:30 FET	Al-Hazaa 46'	Report

28 July 2017 Friendly	Al-Ettifaq (Saudi Arabia)	3–0	(Uzbekistan) Pakhtakor	Istanbul, Turkey
16:30 FET	Al-Saiari 61'; Callejón 67', 71'	Report

25 August 2017 Friendly	Al-Taawoun (Saudi Arabia)	1–0	(Saudi Arabia) Al-Ettifaq	Buraidah, Saudi Arabia
17:45 AST	Hazazi 43'	Report		Stadium: King Abdullah Sport City Stadium

29 August 2017 Friendly	Al-Ettifaq (Saudi Arabia)	1–1	(Saudi Arabia) Hajer	Dammam, Saudi Arabia
17:45 AST	Salinas 16'	Report	Al-Harajin 76' (pen.)	Stadium: Al-Ettifaq Club Stadium

4 September 2017 Friendly	Al-Hilal (Saudi Arabia)	2–0	(Saudi Arabia) Al-Ettifaq	Riyadh, Saudi Arabia
17:20 AST	Fallatah 27'; Carlos Eduardo 68'	Report		Stadium: Prince Turki bin Sultan bin Abdulaziz Stadium

7 September 2017 Friendly	Al-Nahda (Saudi Arabia)	0–4	(Saudi Arabia) Al-Ettifaq	Dammam, Saudi Arabia
19:00 AST		Report	Al-Hazaa 13', 38'; Al-Selim 36'; Al-Saiari 47'	Stadium: Prince Fahd bin Salman Stadium Stadium

== Competitions ==
=== Overall ===
Competition	Started round	Current position / round	Final position / round	First match	Last match
Professional League	—	—	4th	11 August 2017	12 April 2018
King Cup	Round of 32	—	Round of 16	3 January 2018	19 January 2018

Last Updated: 12 April 2018

=== Pro League ===
==== League table ====
Pos	Team	Pld	W	D	L	GF	GA	GD	Pts	Qualification or relegation
2	Al-Ahli	26	16	7	3	59	26	+33	55	Qualification to AFC Champions League group stage
3	Al-Nassr	26	12	8	6	47	34	+13	44	Qualification to AFC Champions League play-off round
4	Al-Ettifaq	26	10	6	10	37	46	−9	36 (Note: Al-Ettifaq finished ahead of Al-Fateh on head-to-head points: Al-Ettifaq 2–1 Al-Fateh, Al-Fateh 1–1 Al-Ettifaq)	
5	Al-Fateh	26	9	9	8	34	39	−5	36	
6	Al-Faisaly	26	9	8	9	39	33	+6	35	

Updated to match(es) played on 12 April 2018. Source: slstat.com
Rules for classification: 1) Points; 2) Head-to-head points; 3) Head-to-head goal difference; 4) Total goal difference; 5) Total goals scored; 6) Play-off (only for deciding champion, relegation and AFC competitions participation).

==== Results summary ====
Overall								Home						Away					
Pld	W	D	L	GF	GA	GD	Pts	W	D	L	GF	GA	GD	W	D	L	GF	GA	GD
26	10	6	10	37	46	−9	36	7	2	4	23	20	+3	3	4	6	14	26	−12

Last updated: 12 April 2018.
Source: Competitive matches

==== Results by round ====
Round	1	2	3	4	5	6	7	8	9	10	11	12	13	14	15	16	17	18	19	20	21	22	23	24	25	26
Ground	H	A	H	H	A	H	A	A	H	A	A	H	A	A	H	A	A	H	A	H	H	A	H	H	A	H
Result	W	D	L	L	L	L	D	W	W	L	D	L	L	L	W	W	L	D	D	W	D	W	W	W	L	W
Position	6	4	8	11	12	13	13	11	10	10	10	12	13	13	13	12	13	13	12	11	11	11	8	6	9	4

Updated to match(es) played on 12 April 2018. Source: Competitive matches
A = Away; H = Home; W = Win; D = Draw; L = Loss

==== Matches ====
All times are local, AST (UTC+3).

Win Draw Loss Postponed

11 August 2017 1	Al-Ettifaq	2–1	Al-Ahli	Dammam
20:55	Al-Saiari (yellow card) 45+3'; Al-Hazaa 58', 68'; Al-Kassar (yellow card) 90+1'	Report	Al-Somah (yellow card) 11', (goal) 56'; Al-Asmari (yellow card) 34'	Stadium: Prince Mohamed bin Fahd Stadium; Attendance: 3,722; Referee: Khaled Al-Teris

18 August 2017 2	Al-Nassr	2–2	Al-Ettifaq	Riyadh
20:50	Al-Shehri 15'; Al-Jumaiah (yellow card) 37'; Al-Sahlawi 51' (pen.); Abdullah (yellow card) 74'; Uvini (yellow card) 77'	Report	Kiss 65'; Al-Khaibari (yellow card) 90+2'; Al-Hazaa 90+3'	Stadium: King Fahd International Stadium; Attendance: 7,884; Referee: Turki Al-Khudair

14 September 2017 3	Al-Ettifaq	1–2	Al-Qadsiah	Dammam
20:25	Ibrahim (yellow card) 45+1'; Salinas 60' (pen.); Al-Habib (yellow card) 75'	Report	Bismark 6'; Hazazi (yellow card) 43'; Kenniche (yellow card) 64'; Barnawi (yellow card) 66'; Al-Obaid 90+3'	Stadium: Prince Mohamed bin Fahd Stadium; Attendance: 1,526; Referee: Khaled Salwi

23 September 2017 4	Al-Ettifaq	2–3	Al-Shabab	Dammam
18:15	Al-Hazaa 35', 57'; Al-Khairi (yellow card) 41'	Report	Ibrahim 37' (o.g.); Salem 40'; Al-Fahad (yellow card) 48'; Bahebri 89'	Stadium: Prince Mohamed bin Fahd Stadium; Attendance: 2,527; Referee: Turki Al-Khudair

30 September 2017 5	Al-Faisaly	3–0	Al-Ettifaq	Al Majma'ah
18:30	Hamzi 14'; Abdulaziz (yellow card) 45+1', (goal) 59'; Majrashi (yellow card) 45+2'; Seraj 90+3'	Report		Stadium: King Salman Sport City Stadium; Attendance: 275; Referee: Khaled Al-Teris

14 October 2017 6	Al-Ettifaq	1–3	Al-Batin	Dammam
17:55	Kiss (yellow card) 8'; Freeh 12' (o.g.); Callejón (yellow card) 80'; Al-Khaibari (yellow card) 88'	Report	Jhonnattann 35'; Nasser (yellow card) 52'; Kanabah (yellow card) 58'; Pitty 61'; Al-Shammeri (yellow card) 67'; Masrahi 69'	Stadium: Prince Mohamed bin Fahd Stadium; Attendance: 503; Referee: Khaled Al-Teris

20 October 2017 7	Al-Fateh	1–1	Al-Ettifaq	Al-Hasa
17:50	Majrashi (yellow card) 37'; Al-Fuhaid (yellow card) 45+1'; Sandro Manoel 90'	Report	Al-Khairi (yellow card) 28'; Kiss (yellow card) 37'; Majrashi (yellow card) 66'; Hazaa Al-Hazaa 86' (pen.)	Stadium: Prince Abdullah bin Jalawi Stadium; Attendance: 4,911; Referee: Sami Al-Jires

25 October 2017 8	Al-Fayha	1–2	Al-Ettifaq	Al Majma'ah
18:05	Al-Mutairi (yellow card) 51'; Al-Salem 70'	Report	Al-Khaibari 65', (yellow card) 90'; Callejón 72'	Stadium: King Salman Sport City Stadium; Attendance: 370; Referee: Mohammed Al-Hoaish

31 October 2017 9	Al-Ettifaq	2–0	Al-Raed	Dammam
17:35	Al-Hazaa 31'; Al-Kwikbi 38'; Al-Sobeai (yellow card) 42'; Al-Khairi (yellow card) 70'; Kiss (yellow card) 89'	Report		Stadium: Prince Mohamed bin Fahd Stadium; Attendance: 646; Referee: Sultan Al-Harbi

16 November 2017 10	Ohod	1–0	Al-Ettifaq	Medina
19:40	Vorsah 17', (yellow card) 29'; Hawsawi (yellow card) 24'; Mohsen (yellow card) 65'	Report	Ibrahim (yellow card) 10'; Majrashi (yellow card) 67'; Al-Khaibari (yellow card) 90+1'	Stadium: Prince Mohammed bin Abdul Aziz Stadium; Attendance: 1,200; Referee: Arnold Hunter (Northern Ireland)

30 November 2017 12	Al-Ettifaq	1–2	Al-Ittihad	Khobar
19:40	Kiss 5'; Al-Subaie (yellow card) 33'; Ibrahim (yellow card) 54'; Al-Khaibari (yellow card) 69'; Al-Trais (yellow card) 90+7'	Report	Al-Najar (yellow card) 12'; Akaïchi 55' (pen.); Al Ansari (yellow card) 69'; Al-Sumairi (yellow card) 70'; Kahraba (yellow card) 81'; Abdoh (yellow card) 86'; Waseli 90' (o.g.); Al-Muziel (yellow card) 90+2'	Stadium: Prince Saud bin Jalawi Stadium; Attendance: 2,665; Referee: Ivan Bebek (Croatia)

10 December 2017 13	Al-Taawoun	4–0	Al-Ettifaq	Buraidah
17:50	Kamara 33'; Al-Mousa (yellow card) 43'; Hazazi 77'; Machado 90+4'; El-Hadary 90+8' (pen.)	Report	Al-Khalaf (yellow card) 61'; Al-Trais (yellow card) 90+7'	Stadium: King Abdullah Sport City Stadium; Attendance: 2,648; Referee: Mark Clattenburg (England)

15 December 2017 14	Al-Ahli	4–1	Al-Ettifaq	Jeddah
19:40	Al-Jassim 5', (yellow card) 27'; Al-Mowalad (yellow card) 45+5'; Assiri 48', 63', (yellow card) 53'; Al-Harbi 84'	Report	Al-Khalaf (yellow card) 14'; Al-Khairi (yellow card) 22'; Salinas 35'; Al-Khaibari (yellow card) 56'	Stadium: King Abdullah Sports City; Attendance: 4,831; Referee: Szymon Marciniak (Poland)

22 December 2017 15	Al-Ettifaq	3–2	Al-Nassr	Dammam
19:45	Mahnashi (yellow card) 35'; Al-Kwikbi 41', 71'; Al-Ghamdi 53'; Al-Khalaf (yellow card) 74'; Al-Zubaidi (yellow card) 88'	Report	Fouzair 56'; Madu (yellow card) 63'; Jebor 72'	Stadium: Prince Mohamed bin Fahd Stadium; Attendance: 1,878; Referee: Mohammed Al-Hoaish

8 January 2018 11	Al-Hilal	1–1	Al-Ettifaq	Riyadh
19:55	Al-Faraj (yellow card) 34'; Al-Hafith 45+5'	Report	Al-Zubaidi (yellow card) 26'; Al-Habib 49'; Al-Selouli (yellow card) 62'; Al-Kassar (yellow card) 86'	Stadium: Prince Faisal bin Fahd Stadium; Attendance: 4,163; Referee: Armando Villarreal (United States)

14 January 2018 17	Al-Shabab	3–1	Al-Ettifaq	Riyadh
18:05	Benyettou 56', 85'; Pizzelli 90+3'	Report	Al-Aboud 27', (yellow card) 79'; Mahnashi (yellow card) 36'; Al-Saiari (yellow card) 42'	Stadium: Prince Faisal bin Fahd Stadium; Attendance: 651; Referee: Armando Villarreal (United States)

29 January 2018 19	Al-Batin	1–1	Al-Ettifaq	Hafar al-Batin
18:15	Jorge Santos 90+5'	Report	Al-Aboud 67'; Al Khairi (yellow card) 75'	Stadium: Al-Batin Club Stadium; Attendance: 1,734; Referee: Stefan Johannesson (Sweden)

3 February 2018 20	Al-Ettifaq	2–1	Al-Fateh	Dammam
18:00	Abdi 19'; El Sheikh 55'; Al-Ghamdi (yellow card) 73'; M'Bolhi (yellow card) 85'; Ben Youssef (yellow card) 87'	Report	Oueslati 5'; Al-Majhad (yellow card) 59'; Al-Dawsari (yellow card) 78'	Stadium: Prince Mohamed bin Fahd Stadium; Attendance: 2,768; Referee: Danny Makkelie (Netherlands)

10 February 2018 21	Al-Ettifaq	1–1	Al-Fayha	Dammam
20:20	Ben Youssef 25'; Al-Sonain (yellow card) 66'; Al-Kwikbi (yellow card) 90+2'	Report	Al-Khaibari (yellow card) 69'; Asprilla (yellow card) 78'; Fernández 90'	Stadium: Prince Mohamed bin Fahd Stadium; Attendance: 3,230; Referee: Mark Clattenburg (England)

16 February 2017 22	Al-Raed	0–1	Al-Ettifaq	Buraidah
15:55	Al-Shamekh (yellow card) 34'; Otaif (yellow card) 44'; Shikabala (yellow card) 83'	Report	El Sheikh (yellow card) 25'; El Sayed (yellow card) 46'; Abdi 77'	Stadium: King Abdullah Sport City Stadium; Attendance: 5,039; Referee: Ivan Bebek (Croatia)

21 February 2018 16	Al-Qadsiah	1–2	Al-Ettifaq	Khobar
19:50	Barnawi (yellow card) 25'; Kamara 36'; Stanley (yellow card) 69'	Report	Al-Ghamdi 3', (yellow card) 38'; Hazazi (yellow card) 76', (goal) 85'; Ben Youssef (yellow card) 77'	Stadium: Prince Saud bin Jalawi Stadium; Attendance: 2,523; Referee: Simon Lee Evans (Wales)

2 March 2018 23	Al-Ettifaq	3–2	Ohod	Dammam
18:25	Kiss (yellow card) 18'; Al-Sonain (yellow card) 29'; Ben Youssef 39'; Al-Aboud 45'; Al-Khalaf (yellow card) 64'; Al-Ghamdi 84'	Report	Essifi 36', 78', (yellow card) 78'; Al-Khaldi (yellow card) 58'; Aashor (yellow card) 83'	Stadium: Prince Mohamed bin Fahd Stadium; Attendance: 3,504; Referee: Paul McLaughlin (Republic of Ireland)

6 March 2018 18	Al-Ettifaq	0–0	Al-Faisaly	Dammam
18:25	Ben Youssef (yellow card) 29'; Al-Sonain (yellow card) 90+2'	Report	Majrashi (yellow card) 31'; Al-Ghanam (yellow card) 51'; Al-Robeai (yellow card) 60'	Stadium: Prince Mohamed bin Fahd Stadium; Attendance: 1,618; Referee: Ivan Bebek (Croatia)

9 March 2018 24	Al-Ettifaq	2–1	Al-Hilal	Dammam
20:30	El Sayed (yellow card) 39'; Al-Kwikbi 57'; Al Khairi (yellow card) 73'; Kiss 86' (pen.); M'Bolhi (yellow card) 90+4'	Report	Otayf (yellow card) 54'; Al-Faraj (yellow card) 90+2'; Al-Shalhoub 90+4'; Al-Fiqi (yellow card) 90+4'	Stadium: Prince Mohamed bin Fahd Stadium; Attendance: 14,618; Referee: Matej Jug (Slovenia)

6 April 2018 25	Al-Ittihad	4–2	Al-Ettifaq	Jeddah
20:40	Sufyani 44', 72'; Al-Nakhli (yellow card) 45+2'; Villanueva (yellow card) 53'; Al Ansari 57'; Bajandouh 66', (yellow card) 71'	Report	Al-Kwikbi (yellow card) 45+2'; Ibrahim (yellow card) 51'; Ben Youssef 83'; Hamzah 90+5' (o.g.)	Stadium: King Abdullah Sports City; Attendance: 14,086; Referee: Marius Avram (Romania)

12 April 2018 26	Al-Ettifaq	3–2	Al-Taawoun	Dammam
18:40	Al-Kwikbi 33'; Al-Khalaf (yellow card) 36' (yellow-red card) 53'; Al-Sonain (yellow card) 62'; Ben Youssef 63'; Bo Amer 78'; Ibrahim (yellow card) 65' (yellow-red card) 90+5'	Report	Al-Shammari 23'; Al-Zubaidi (yellow card) 36'; Al-Mousa (yellow card) 41'; Amissi (yellow card) 77' (yellow-red card) 83'; Popa (yellow card) 90+2'; Al-Baqawi (yellow card) 90+4'; Adam 90+9' (pen.)	Stadium: Prince Mohamed bin Fahd Stadium; Attendance: 970; Referee: Daniel Stefański (Poland)

=== King Cup ===
Al-Ettifaq will enter the King Cup in the Round of 32 alongside the other Pro League teams. All times are local, AST (UTC+3).

3 January 2018 Round of 32	Al-Ettifaq	6–0	Al-Tai	Dammam
17:40	Al-Selouli 28', 44'; Al-Saiari 33', 48', 49'; Al-Zubaidi (yellow card) 54'; Al-Sonain 59'	Report	Al-Amri (yellow card) 1'; Al-Jarrad (yellow card) 90+1'	Stadium: Prince Mohamed bin Fahd Stadium; Referee: Sami Al-Jires

19 January 2018 Round of 16	Al-Ittihad	2–1	Al-Ettifaq	Jeddah
20:10	Villanueva 61'; Al-Muwallad 90+12'	Report	Kiss 39', (yellow card) 60'; Al-Saleh (yellow card) 57' (yellow-red card) 90+1'; Al Hajri (yellow card) 61'	Stadium: King Abdullah Sports City; Attendance: 44,010; Referee: Jonas Eriksson (Sweden)

=== Crown Prince Cup ===
Al-Ettifaq will enter the Crown Prince Cup in the Round of 16 alongside the other Pro League teams. On 19 September 2017, it was announced that the tournament was cancelled.

30 October 2017 Round of 16	Al-Ettifaq	Cancelled	Al-Ahli	Dammam
19:30				Stadium: Prince Mohammed Bin Fahad Stadium

== Statistics ==
=== Appearances ===
As of 12 April 2018.

No.	Pos	Nat	Player	Total		Pro League		King Cup	
No.	Pos	Nat	Player	Apps	Goals	Apps	Goals	Apps	Goals
2	DF	(Saudi Arabia)	Omar Al-Sonain	10	1	7+1	0	2	1
3	DF	(Saudi Arabia)	Abdulelah Bokhari	0	0	0	0	0	0
4	DF	(Iraq)	Ahmed Ibrahim	24	0	23	0	1	0
6	MF	(Saudi Arabia)	Yahya Otain	1	0	0	0	0+1	0
7	MF	(Saudi Arabia)	Mohammed Al-Kwikbi	26	5	24	5	2	0
8	MF	(Saudi Arabia)	Osama Al-Khalaf	12	0	7+5	0	0	0
9	FW	(Saudi Arabia)	Hazaa Al-Hazaa	12	7	12	7	0	0
10	MF	(Saudi Arabia)	Hassan Al-Habib	7	0	1+5	0	1	0
11	MF	(Saudi Arabia)	Ali Hazazi	8	1	6+1	1	1	0
12	DF	(Saudi Arabia)	Mohammed Al-Zubaidi	5	0	3	0	2	0
13	DF	(Saudi Arabia)	Osama Al-Saleem	5	0	4+1	0	0	0
14	MF	(Slovakia)	Filip Kiss	25	4	22+1	3	2	1
16	FW	(Saudi Arabia)	Yousef Al-Salem	4	0	0+4	0	0	0
17	FW	(Saudi Arabia)	Nawaf Bouamer	2	1	0+1	1	0+1	0
18	MF	(Saudi Arabia)	Fawaz Al-Torais	3	0	0+3	0	0	0
22	MF	(Egypt)	Ahmed El Sheikh	10	1	6+3	1	1	0
23	MF	(Somalia)	Liban Abdi	13	2	10+2	2	1	0
24	MF	(Saudi Arabia)	Abdurahman Al-Aboud	23	3	10+12	3	0+1	0
25	MF	(Saudi Arabia)	Talal Majrashi	1	0	0+1	0	0	0
28	GK	(Saudi Arabia)	Ahmed Al-Kassar	10	0	10	0	0	0
29	MF	(Saudi Arabia)	Mohammad Al-Subaie	16	0	6+10	0	0	0
30	GK	(Saudi Arabia)	Abdullah Al-Saleh	9	0	7	0	2	0
33	DF	(Egypt)	Hussein El Sayed	9	0	9	0	0	0
34	DF	(Saudi Arabia)	Ali Al-Khaibari	13	0	12+1	0	0	0
40	MF	(Saudi Arabia)	Ibrahim Mahnashi	7	0	3+3	0	0+1	0
47	MF	(Saudi Arabia)	Ahmed Al-Dohaim	0	0	0	0	0	0
50	DF	(Saudi Arabia)	Saad Al Khairi	21	0	20+1	0	0	0
51	DF	(Saudi Arabia)	Majed Al-Khaibari	11	1	11	1	0	0
70	FW	(Saudi Arabia)	Mohammed Al-Saiari	14	3	5+7	0	2	3
77	DF	(Saudi Arabia)	Ahmed Al-Habib	5	1	4	1	1	0
80	MF	(Saudi Arabia)	Hamed Al-Ghamdi	11	3	7+3	3	1	0
88	MF	(Saudi Arabia)	Saad Al-Selouli	3	2	1+1	0	1	2
92	GK	(Algeria)	Raïs M'Bolhi	9	0	9	0	0	0
99	FW	(Tunisia)	Fakhreddine Ben Youssef	8	4	7+1	4	0	0
Players who left during the season
5	DF	(Kuwait)	Fahed Al Hajri	13	0	8+3	0	2	0
15	MF	(Spain)	Juanmi Callejón	13	1	12+1	1	0	0
19	FW	(Argentina)	Rodrigo Salinas	8	2	7	2	0+1	0
20	MF	(Saudi Arabia)	Abdulaziz Majrashi	13	0	13	0	0	0
27	DF	(Saudi Arabia)	Abdulaziz Waseli	2	0	1+1	0	0	0
35	GK	(Saudi Arabia)	Mohammed Al-Haiti	1	0	0	0	0+1	0

=== Goalscorers ===
Rank	No.	Pos	Nat	Name	Pro League	King Cup	Total
1	9	FW	(Saudi Arabia)	Hazaa Al-Hazaa	7	0	7
2	7	MF	(Saudi Arabia)	Mohammed Al-Kwikbi	5	0	5
3	14	MF	(Slovakia)	Filip Kiss	3	1	4
3	99	FW	(Tunisia)	Fakhreddine Ben Youssef	4	0	4
5	24	MF	(Saudi Arabia)	Abdulrahman Al-Aboud	3	0	3
5	70	FW	(Saudi Arabia)	Mohammed Al-Saiari	0	3	3
5	80	MF	(Saudi Arabia)	Hamed Al-Ghamdi	3	0	3
8	19	FW	(Argentina)	Rodrigo Salinas	2	0	2
8	23	MF	(Somalia)	Liban Abdi	2	0	2
8	88	MF	(Saudi Arabia)	Saad Al-Selouli	0	2	2
11	2	DF	(Saudi Arabia)	Omar Al-Sonain	0	1	1
11	11	MF	(Saudi Arabia)	Ali Hazazi	1	0	1
11	15	MF	(Spain)	Juanmi Callejón	1	0	1
11	17	FW	(Saudi Arabia)	Nawaf Bouamer	1	0	1
11	22	MF	(Egypt)	Ahmed El Sheikh	1	0	1
11	34	DF	(Saudi Arabia)	Ali Al-Khaibari	1	0	1
11	77	DF	(Saudi Arabia)	Ahmed Al-Habib	1	0	1
Own goal					2	0	2
Total					37	7	44

Last Updated: 12 April 2018

=== Clean sheets ===
Rank	No.	Pos	Nat	Name	Pro League	King Cup	Total
1	30	GK	(Saudi Arabia)	Abdullah Al-Saleh	1	1	2
1	92	GK	(Algeria)	Raïs M'Bolhi	2	0	2
Total					3	1	4

Last Updated: 6 March 2018
