= 2016–17 Ettifaq FC season =

Al-Ettifaq
2016–17 season
- President: Khalid Al Dabal
- Manager: Djamel Belkacem (until 29 October 2016); Juan Garrido (from 18 October 2016 to 18 February 2017); Eelco Schattorie (from 18 February 2017)
- Stadium: Prince Mohamed bin Fahd Stadium
- SPL: 11th
- King Cup: Quarter-finals
- Crown Prince Cup: Round of 32
- Top goalscorer: League: Mohammed Al-Kwikbi; Hazaa Al-Hazaa (5); All: Hazaa Al-Hazaa (6)
- Highest home attendance: 14,640 vs Al-Hilal (28 January 2017)
- Lowest home attendance: 506 vs Al-Shabab (3 May 2017)
- Average home league attendance: 3,767
Home colours	Away colours	Third colours
- All statistics correct as of 3 May 2017.

The 2016–17 season was Al-Ettifaq Football Club's 72nd season in existence and first season in the Pro League since their relegation in the 2013–14 season; after gaining promotion last year. Along with the Pro League, the club also competed in the Crown Prince Cup and the King Cup. The season covered the period from 1 July 2016 to 30 June 2017.

== Players ==
=== Squad information ===
As of 31 January 2017

Note: Flags indicate national team as defined under FIFA eligibility rules; some limited exceptions apply. Players may hold more than one non-FIFA nationality.

No.	Pos.	Nation	Player
1	GK	KSA	Osama Al-Hamdan
2	DF	KSA	Omar Al-Sonain
3	DF	CMR	Aminou Bouba
4	DF	BFA	Mohamed Koffi (on loan from El Zamalek)
5	DF	KSA	Murtadha Al-Burayh
6	MF	KSA	Yahya Otain
7	MF	KSA	Mohammed Al-Kwikbi
8	MF	KSA	Mohamed Kanno
9	FW	KSA	Hazaa Al-Hazaa
13	DF	KSA	Hassan Kadesh (captain)
15	MF	KSA	Nasser Al-Abdeli
16	FW	KSA	Yousef Al-Salem
18	MF	KSA	Abdulaziz Al-Nashi
21	FW	BOL	Yasmani Duk
22	MF	ESP	Juanmi Callejón

No.	Pos.	Nation	Player
23	MF	KSA	Hassan Al-Habib
24	DF	KSA	Jamaan Al-Dossari
25	MF	KSA	Saleh Al-Amri (on loan from Al-Ahli)
27	MF	KSA	Osama Al-Khalaf
28	GK	KSA	Ahmed Al-Kassar
29	DF	KSA	Osama Al-Saleem
30	GK	KSA	Abdullah Al-Saleh
31	DF	KSA	Mohammed Al-Zubaidi
32	GK	KSA	Abdullah Al Bahri
33	DF	KSA	Saad Al-Khairi
34	MF	KSA	Abdurahman Al-Aboud
35	MF	KSA	Abdulaziz Majrashi
37	DF	KSA	Abdulaziz Waseli
40	FW	NGR	Michael Eneramo
77	MF	KSA	Ahmed Al-Shehri

== Transfers ==
=== In ===
==== Summer ====
No.	Pos	Player	Transferred From	Fee	Date	Source
10	ST	(Brazil) Leo	(Saudi Arabia) Al-Mujazzel	Free	5 May 2016	
11	ST	(Saudi Arabia) Mohammed Al-Saiari	(Saudi Arabia) Hajer	Undisclosed	18 May 2016	
15	LM	(Saudi Arabia) Nasser Al-Abdeli	(Saudi Arabia) Al-Orobah	Free	30 May 2016	
7	LM	(Saudi Arabia) Mohammed Al-Kwikbi	(Saudi Arabia) Al-Orobah	Undisclosed	13 June 2016	
12	RB	(Saudi Arabia) Salman Hazazi	(Saudi Arabia) Al-Khaleej	Free	15 June 2016	
17	DM	(Guinea) Boubacar Fofana	(Portugal) Nacional	Free	19 June 2016	
1	GK	(Saudi Arabia) Osama Al-Hamdan	(Saudi Arabia) Al-Nahda	Free	27 June 2016	
24	CB	(Saudi Arabia) Jamaan Al-Dossari	(Saudi Arabia) Al-Nassr	Free	30 June 2016	
18	DM	(Saudi Arabia) Abdulaziz Al-Nashi	(Saudi Arabia) Al-Nahda	Free	22 August 2016	
16	ST	(Saudi Arabia) Yousef Al-Salem	(Saudi Arabia) Al-Hilal	Free	3 September 2016	
3	CB	(Cameroon) Aminou Bouba	(Saudi Arabia) Al-Khaleej	Undisclosed	8 September 2016	

==== Winter ====
No.	Pos	Player	Transferred From	Fee	Date	Source
21	ST	(Bolivia) Yasmani Duk	(Bolivia) Sport Boys Warnes	Undisclosed	12 January 2017	
22	RM	(Spain) Juanmi Callejón	(Bolivia) Club Bolívar	Undisclosed	15 January 2017	
27	DM	(Saudi Arabia) Osama Al-Khalaf	(Saudi Arabia) Hajer	Undisclosed	22 January 2017	
40	ST	(Nigeria) Michael Eneramo		Free	3 April 2017	

=== Out ===
==== Summer ====
No.	Pos	Player	Transferred To	Fee	Date	Source
12	RB	(Bahrain) Abdullah Omar	(Bahrain) Al-Muharraq	Free	1 July 2016	
18	CM	(Saudi Arabia) Ibrahim Al-Ibrahim	(Saudi Arabia) Al-Khaleej	Free	11 July 2016	
-	CM	(Saudi Arabia) Al-Baraa Baadheem	(Saudi Arabia) Najran	Free	20 July 2016	
85	AM	(Brazil) Ricardinho		Released	2 August 2016	
26	DM	(Saudi Arabia) Abdoh Hakami	(Saudi Arabia) Al-Nahda	Free	10 August 2016	
-	ST	(Saudi Arabia) Mahmoud Al-Sayegh	(Saudi Arabia) Al-Taraji	Free	1 September 2016	
12	RB	(Saudi Arabia) Salman Hazazi		Released	9 October 2016	

==== Winter ====
No.	Pos	Player	Transferred To	Fee	Date	Source
-	DM	(Saudi Arabia) Saud Fallatah	(Saudi Arabia) Al-Nojoom	Free	1 January 2017	
10	ST	(Brazil) Leo	(Saudi Arabia) Al-Tai	Free	4 January 2017	

=== Loan in ===
==== Summer ====
No.	Pos	Player	Loaned From	Start	End	Source
17	CB	(Saudi Arabia) Hamed Al-Sherif	(Saudi Arabia) Al-Ahli	13 July 2016	20 January 2017	
4	CB	(Burkina Faso) Mohamed Koffi	(Egypt) Zamalek	8 August 2016	30 June 2017	
25	LM	(Saudi Arabia) Saleh Al-Amri	(Saudi Arabia) Al-Ahli	25 August 2016	30 June 2017	

=== Loan out ===
==== Summer ====
No.	Pos	Player	Loaned To	Start	End	Source
90	ST	(Saudi Arabia) Khaled Al-Aboud	(Saudi Arabia) Al-Khaleej	8 July 2016	31 December 2016	
32	GK	(Saudi Arabia) Abdullah Al Bahri	(Saudi Arabia) Al-Nojoom	8 July 2016	1 October 2016	
36	CM	(Saudi Arabia) Khaled Al-Hamdhi	(Saudi Arabia) Al-Orobah	15 July 2016	30 June 2017	
-	CB	(Saudi Arabia) Saad Al Khairi	(Saudi Arabia) Al-Orobah	15 July 2016	25 January 2017	
-	ST	(Saudi Arabia) Abdulrahman Al-Aboud	(Saudi Arabia) Al-Orobah	15 July 2016	25 January 2017	
12	RB	(Saudi Arabia) Ayman Masrahi	(Saudi Arabia) Al-Qaisumah	19 July 2016	30 June 2017	
-	DM	(Saudi Arabia) Saud Fallatah	(Saudi Arabia) Al-Nojoom	1 August 2016	31 December 2016	
10	AM	(Saudi Arabia) Aiedh Al-Sohaimi	(Saudi Arabia) Al-Nahda	11 August 2016	30 June 2017	
-	CM	(Saudi Arabia) Mohammad Al-Subaie	(Saudi Arabia) Al-Nahda	11 August 2016	30 June 2017	
15	ST	(Saudi Arabia) Zamil Al-Sulim	(Saudi Arabia) Al-Shoulla	15 September 2016	30 June 2017	

==== Winter ====
No.	Pos	Player	Loaned To	Start	End	Source
11	ST	(Saudi Arabia) Mohammed Al-Saiari	(Saudi Arabia) Al-Taawoun	7 January 2017	30 June 2017	
99	ST	(Saudi Arabia) Turki Sufyani	(Saudi Arabia) Al-Nahda	9 January 2017	30 June 2017	
90	ST	(Saudi Arabia) Khaled Al-Aboud	(Saudi Arabia) Al-Nojoom	10 January 2017	30 June 2017	
20	ST	(Saudi Arabia) Jaber Al-Ziyadi	(Saudi Arabia) Al-Nahda	11 January 2017	30 June 2017	
19	ST	(Saudi Arabia) Marei Al-Moqaadi	(Saudi Arabia) Al-Hazm	12 January 2017	30 June 2017	
17	DM	(Guinea) Boubacar Fofana	(Saudi Arabia) Al-Khaleej	13 January 2017	30 June 2017	
14	CM	(Saudi Arabia) Lutfi Al-Rashidi	(Saudi Arabia) Al-Qaisumah	14 January 2017	30 June 2017	
26	LM	(Saudi Arabia) Ali Al-Zaqaan	(Saudi Arabia) Al-Fateh	29 January 2017	30 June 2017	

== Pre-season friendlies ==
3 July 2017 Friendly	Al-Ettifaq	1–2	Hajer	Dammam
21:00 AST	Al-Moqaadi 67'	Report	Al-Khalaf 52'; Al-Hamdan 85'	Stadium: Abdullah Al Dabil Stadium

16 July 2016 Friendly	Al-Ettifaq	1–1	Dorogi FC	Austria
16:00 AST	Leo 28'	Report	57'

19 July 2016 Friendly	Al-Ettifaq	1–2	Anzhi Makhachkala	Gornja Radgona
18:00 AST	Fofana 53'	Report	Budkivskyi 2', 26'

27 July 2016 Friendly	Kayserispor	1–2	Al-Ettifaq	Austria
18:00 AST	Nakoulma 15'	Report	Al-Breh 19'; Al-Saiari 71'

6 August 2016 Friendly	Al-Ettifaq	3–2	Al-Khaleej	Dammam
18:00 AST	Leo 7' (pen.); Al-Kwikbi 39'; Al-Saiari 86'; Al-Breh (red card) 90'		Jandson 32'; López 90+2' (pen.)	Stadium: Prince Mohamed bin Fahd Stadium

== Competitions ==
=== Overall ===
Competition	Started round	Current position / round	Final position / round	First match	Last match
Professional League	—	—	11th	14 August 2016	4 May 2017
Crown Prince Cup	Round of 32	—	Round of 32	27 August 2016	27 August 2016
King Cup	Round of 32	—	Quarter-finals	18 January 2017	30 March 2017

Last Updated: 4 May 2017

=== Pro League ===
==== League table ====
Pos	Team	Pld	W	D	L	GF	GA	GD	Pts	Qualification or relegation
9	Al-Faisaly	26	6	10	10	30	41	−11	28 (Note: Al-Faisaly finished ahead of Al-Qadisiyah on head-to-head points: Al-Qadisiyah 1–1 Al-Faisaly, Al-Faisaly 3–2 Al-Qadisiyah)	
10	Al-Qadisiyah	26	6	10	10	38	38	0	28	
11	Al-Ettifaq	26	7	6	13	31	45	−14	27	
12	Al-Batin (O)	26	6	8	12	31	43	−12	26	Qualification to relegation play-off
13	Al-Khaleej (R)	26	5	8	13	32	51	−19	23	Relegation to First Division

Updated to match(es) played on 4 May 2017. Source: slstat.com
Rules for classification: 1) Points; 2) Head-to-head points; 3) Head-to-head goal difference; 4) Total goal difference; 5) Total goals scored; 6) Play-off (only for deciding champion, relegation and AFC competitions participation).
(O) Play-off winners; (R) Relegated

==== Results summary ====
Overall								Home						Away					
Pld	W	D	L	GF	GA	GD	Pts	W	D	L	GF	GA	GD	W	D	L	GF	GA	GD
26	7	6	13	31	45	−14	27	5	2	6	19	21	−2	2	4	7	12	24	−12

Last updated: 4 May 2017.
Source: Competitive matches

==== Results by round ====
Round	1	2	3	4	5	6	7	8	9	10	11	12	13	14	15	16	17	18	19	20	21	22	23	24	25	26
Ground	H	H	A	H	A	H	A	H	A	H	A	H	A	A	A	H	A	H	A	H	A	H	A	H	A	H
Result	L	W	W	W	D	L	L	W	W	W	L	D	D	L	L	L	L	D	L	L	L	W	D	L	D	L
Position	13	6	2	2	4	6	7	6	6	6	6	6	6	6	6	6	6	7	8	9	9	8	8	8	8	11

Updated to match(es) played on 4 May 2017. Source: Competitive matches
A = Away; H = Home; W = Win; D = Draw; L = Loss

==== Matches ====
All times are local, AST (UTC+3).

Win Draw Loss Postponed

14 August 2016 1	Al-Ettifaq	1–4	Al-Ahli	Dammam
20:45	Otain (yellow card) 16'; Kanno 67', (yellow card) 71'; Hazazi (yellow card) 80'; Al-Dossari (yellow card) 83'	Report	Al-Somah 45+1', 81' (pen.); Bassas 63'; Al-Jassim 85'	Stadium: Prince Mohamed bin Fahd Stadium; Attendance: 6,350; Referee: Mohammed Al-Hoaish

20 August 2016 2	Al-Ettifaq	1–0	Al-Nassr	Dammam
21:05	Leo 23'; Fofana (yellow card) 35'; Otain (yellow card) 41'; Al-Zaqaan (yellow card) 79'	Report	Hawsawi (yellow card) 52'	Stadium: Prince Mohamed bin Fahd Stadium; Attendance: 7,450; Referee: Mohammed Al-Qarni

16 September 2016 3	Al-Hilal	1–2	Al-Ettifaq	Riyadh
20:45	Jahfali (yellow card) 36'; Al-Abed 57'; Al-Shamrani (yellow card) 79'	Report	Al-Hazaa 80'; Al-Zaqaan 81'	Stadium: King Fahd International Stadium; Attendance: 7,484; Referee: Szymon Marciniak (Poland)

21 September 2016 4	Al-Ettifaq	2–1	Al-Batin	Dammam
20:25	Fofana 9'; Bouba (yellow card) 44'; Al-Kwikbi 76'	Report	W. Al-Enezi 2'; Ayyadah (yellow card) 71'; Dakheel (yellow card) 83'	Stadium: Prince Mohamed bin Fahd Stadium; Attendance: 2,246; Referee: Hussain Abu Shaheen

14 October 2016 5	Al-Fateh	0–0	Al-Ettifaq	Al-Hasa
17:55	Al-Juahaim (yellow card) 35'; Al-Ammar (yellow card) 71'	Report		Stadium: Prince Abdullah bin Jalawi Stadium; Attendance: 1,408; Referee: Khaled Al-Sinany

21 October 2016 6	Al-Ettifaq	1–3	Al-Wehda	Dammam
17:45	Al-Moqaadi 38'	Report	Mahboob (yellow card) 33'; Fallatah 34', 68'; Dagoulo (yellow card) 35'; Al-Shahrani 63'; Belal (yellow card) 84'	Stadium: Prince Mohamed bin Fahd Stadium; Attendance: 1,530; Referee: Fahad Al-Mirdasi

28 October 2016 7	Al-Raed	2–0	Al-Ettifaq	Buraidah
18:00	Al-Sawadi (yellow card) 17'; Bangoura 23'; Gilmar (yellow card) 26'; Al-Qahtani 37'; Sharahili (yellow card) 43'; Al-Bishi (yellow card) 45'; Al-Amri (yellow card) 81'	Report	Al-Kassar (yellow card) 18'; Bouba (yellow card) 46'; Al-Zaqaan (yellow card) 53'; Al-Moqaadi (yellow card) 62'	Stadium: King Abdullah Sport City Stadium; Attendance: 1,942; Referee: Shukri Al-Hanfosh

5 November 2016 8	Al-Ettifaq	3–0	Al-Taawoun	Dammam
17:35	Al-Kwikbi 48'; Fofana (yellow card) 63'; Al-Saiari 68', (yellow card) 68'; Al-Hazaa 87'	Report	Al-Sharid (yellow card) 35'; Al-Absi (yellow card) 62'; Al-Shammeri (yellow card) 81'	Stadium: Prince Mohamed bin Fahd Stadium; Attendance: 1,235; Referee: Abdulrahman Al-Shehri

19 November 2016 9	Al-Khaleej	1–2	Al-Ettifaq	Khobar
17:35	Al-Salem 7'; François (yellow card) 29' (yellow-red card) 52'; Sami (yellow card) 33'; Lawgami (yellow card) 66'	Report	Al-Kwikbi 2', 75'; Koffi (yellow card) 20'	Stadium: Prince Saud bin Jalawi Stadium; Attendance: 863; Referee: Mohammed Al-Nuhait

24 November 2016 10	Al-Ettifaq	3–1	Al-Faisaly	Dammam
17:30	Fofana (yellow card) 27'; Kanno 62'; Al-Amri 64'; Al-Salem 77'	Report	Cabrera 38'; Al-Zylaeei (yellow card) 60'; Al-Sowayed (yellow card) 71'; Alemão (yellow card) 82'	Stadium: Prince Mohamed bin Fahd Stadium; Attendance: 2,750; Referee: Khaled Al-Sinany

2 December 2016 11	Al-Ittihad	4–1	Al-Ettifaq	Jeddah
19:40	Kahraba 2', 90+3', (yellow card) 13'; Villanueva (yellow card) 27'; Al-Muwallad 54'; Al-Dossari 63' (o.g.); Al-Muziel (yellow card) 64'	Report	Kadesh (yellow card) 24'; Otain (yellow card) 38'; Bouba 45+1'; Kanno (yellow card) 77'	Stadium: King Abdullah Sports City; Attendance: 28,532; Referee: Turki Al-Khudair

9 December 2016 12	Al-Ettifaq	2–2	Al-Qadisiyah	Dammam
17:30	Al-Dossari 35'; Abdulamir 38' (o.g.)	Report	Al-Obaid 67'; Fallatah 75'; Al-Johani (yellow card) 88'	Stadium: Prince Mohamed bin Fahd Stadium; Attendance: 2,566; Referee: Mishari Al-Mishari

15 December 2016 13	Al-Shabab	1–1	Al-Ettifaq	Riyadh
17:50	Benyettou 33'; Jaafer (yellow card) 90+3'	Report	Kanno 78' (pen.)	Stadium: Prince Faisal bin Fahd Stadium; Attendance: 757; Referee: Abdulrahman Al-Shehri

22 December 2016 14	Al-Ahli	4–1	Al-Ettifaq	Jeddah
19:45	Awagi (yellow card) 6', (goal) 60'; Aman 20'; Al-Somah 24', 66'	Report	Al-Hazaa 23'; Otain (yellow card) 31'; Kanno (yellow card) 72'; Al-Nashi (yellow card) 80'	Stadium: King Abdullah Sports City; Attendance: 14,743; Referee: Aleksei Kulbakov (Belarus)

1 January 2017 15	Al-Nassr	2–0	Al-Ettifaq	Riyadh
19:50	Al-Raheb 65', 88', (yellow card) 89'; Al-Sahlawi (yellow card) 85'	Report	Al-Habib (yellow card) 48'; Al-Nashi (yellow card) 59'; Otain (yellow card) 61'; Al-Hazaa (yellow card) 84'	Stadium: Prince Faisal bin Fahd Stadium; Attendance: 4,638; Referee: Gediminas Mažeika (Lithuania)

28 January 2017 16	Al-Ettifaq	0–1	Al-Hilal	Dammam
20:15	Al-Kwikbi (yellow card) 57'; Otain (yellow card) 69'	Report	Milesi 32'	Stadium: Prince Mohamed bin Fahd Stadium; Attendance: 14,640; Referee: Felix Brych (Germany)

2 February 2017 17	Al-Batin	2–0	Al-Ettifaq	Hafar al-Batin
15:35	Silva 19' (pen.); Tarabai 56'; Freeh (yellow card) 59'; Al-Enezi (yellow card) 68'	Report	Al-Dossari (yellow card) 90+1'	Stadium: Al-Batin Club Stadium; Attendance: 2,927; Referee: Turki Al-Khudair

11 February 2017 18	Al-Ettifaq	2–2	Al-Fateh	Dammam
18:10	Al-Salem 48'; Callejón 52'; Bouba (yellow card) 67'; Otain (yellow card) 88'	Report	Ukra 39'; Al-Beladi 90+1'	Stadium: Prince Mohamed bin Fahd Stadium; Attendance: 1,063; Referee: Faisal Al-Balawi

17 February 2017 19	Al-Wehda	2–1	Al-Ettifaq	Makkah
20:25	Fallatah 41' (pen.), 59'; Lima (yellow card) 63'	Report	Al-Arraf 49' (o.g.)	Stadium: King Abdul Aziz Stadium; Attendance: 1,381; Referee: Mohammed Al-Qarni

2 March 2017 20	Al-Ettifaq	0–1	Al-Raed	Dammam
20:30	Bouba (yellow card) 88'	Report	Bangoura 89' (pen.)	Stadium: Prince Mohamed bin Fahd Stadium; Attendance: 1,242; Referee: Abdulrahman Al-Sultan

9 March 2017 21	Al-Taawoun	1–0	Al-Ettifaq	Buraidah
18:50	Kanno (yellow card) 57'; Al-Olayan (yellow card) 64'; N'Diaye 86'	Report	Al-Sonain (yellow card) 79' (yellow-red card) 90+2'; Kadesh (yellow card) 90+2'	Stadium: King Abdullah Sport City Stadium; Attendance: 2,420; Referee: Mohammed Al-Hoaish

8 April 2017 22	Al-Ettifaq	3–1	Al-Khaleej	Dammam
18:40	Eneramo 33'; Majrashi 45'; Al-Dossari (yellow card) 84'; Al-Kwikbi 90+5'	Report	Jandson (yellow card) 43'; Al-Ghamdi 83'	Stadium: Prince Mohamed bin Fahd Stadium; Attendance: 1,330; Referee: Alberto Undiano Mallenco (Spain)

13 April 2017 23	Al-Faisaly	3–3	Al-Ettifaq	Al Majma'ah
19:00	Luisinho 2', 13', (yellow card) 72'; Abbas (yellow card) 66'; Al-Mutairi 82'	Report	Al-Amri 33'; Callejón (yellow card) 39'; Koffi 67'; Al-Salem 90+2'	Stadium: King Salman Sport City Stadium; Attendance: 377; Referee: Turki Al-Khudair

21 April 2017 24	Al-Ettifaq	1–4	Al-Ittihad	Dammam
20:45	Al-Hazaa 90+2' (pen.)	Report	Villanueva 42'; Kahraba 61'; Qassem 70'; Akaïchi 85'	Stadium: Prince Mohamed bin Fahd Stadium; Attendance: 6,068; Referee: Khaled Salwi

29 April 2017 25	Al-Qadisiyah	1–1	Al-Ettifaq	Khobar
20:50	Élton 23'; Al-Dhefiri (yellow card) 27'; Barnawi (yellow card) 66'	Report	Al-Hazaa 13'; Koffi (yellow card) 29'; Kadesh (yellow card) 34'; Al-Sonain (yellow card) 56'	Stadium: Prince Saud bin Jalawi Stadium; Attendance: 642; Referee: Pavel Královec (Czech Republic)

3 May 2017 26	Al-Ettifaq	0–1	Al-Shabab	Dammam
20:50	Eneramo (yellow card) 73'	Report	Al-Fahad (yellow card) 74'; Al-Sulayhem 81'	Stadium: Prince Mohamed bin Fahd Stadium; Attendance: 506; Referee: Sultan Al-Harbi

=== Crown Prince Cup ===
All times are local, AST (UTC+3).

27 August 2016 Round of 32	Al-Watani	1–0	Al-Ettifaq	Tabuk
19:45	Al-Balawi 90+4'			Stadium: King Khalid Sport City Stadium; Referee: Sultan Al-Harbi

=== King Cup ===
18 January 2017 Round of 32	Damac	0–2	Al-Ettifaq	Abha
15:55		Report	Koffi 32'; Kanno 66'	Stadium: Prince Sultan bin Abdul Aziz Stadium; Referee: Ahmed Al-Remeikhany

24 February 2017 Round of 16	Al-Ettifaq	1–0	Al-Fateh	Dammam
19:55	Koffi (yellow card) 29'; Al-Nashi (yellow card) 32'; Al-Amri 43', (yellow card) 65'; Al-Kassar (yellow card) 90+2'	Report	Al-Dawsari (yellow card) 84'; Buhimed (yellow card) 90'	Stadium: Prince Mohamed bin Fahd Stadium; Referee: Raed Al-Zahrani

30 March 2017 Quarter-finals	Al-Ettifaq	2–2 (a.e.t.) (3–5 p)	Al-Taawoun	Dammam
20:15	Bouba 26'; Al-Hazaa 77'; Al-Dossari (yellow card) 104'	Report	Machado 19'; Al-Dossari 32'; Al-Saiari (yellow card) 90+2'; Kanno (yellow card) 120'	Stadium: Prince Mohamed bin Fahd Stadium; Attendance: 1,566; Referee: Khalid Al-Salawy
	Penalties
	Callejón (penalty missed); Al-Kwikbi (penalty scored); Al-Dossari (penalty scored); Bouba (penalty scored)		Machado (penalty scored); Al-Shameri (penalty scored); Al-Barakah (penalty scored); Al-Saiari (penalty scored); Sânmărtean (penalty scored)

== Statistics ==
=== Squad statistics ===
As of 3 May 2017.

No.	Pos	Nat	Player	Total		Pro League		King Cup		Crown Prince Cup	
No.	Pos	Nat	Player	Apps	Goals	Apps	Goals	Apps	Goals	Apps	Goals
1	GK	(Saudi Arabia)	Osama Al-Hamdan	0	0	0	0	0	0	0	0
2	DF	(Saudi Arabia)	Omar Al-Sonain	23	0	19	0	3	0	1	0
3	DF	(Cameroon)	Aminou Bouba	27	2	23	1	3	1	1	0
4	DF	(Burkina Faso)	Mohamed Koffi	27	2	24	1	2	1	1	0
5	DF	(Saudi Arabia)	Murtadha Al-Burayh	1	0	0+1	0	0	0	0	0
6	MF	(Saudi Arabia)	Yahya Otain	17	0	12+2	0	3	0	0	0
7	MF	(Saudi Arabia)	Mohammed Al-Kwikbi	27	5	21+2	5	3	0	1	0
8	MF	(Saudi Arabia)	Mohamed Kanno	22	4	14+5	3	2	1	1	0
9	FW	(Saudi Arabia)	Hazaa Al-Hazaa	28	6	9+15	5	1+2	1	0+1	0
10	FW	(Brazil)	Leo*	7	1	5+1	1	0	0	1	0
11	FW	(Saudi Arabia)	Mohammed Al-Saiari*	9	1	5+3	1	0	0	0+1	0
12	DF	(Saudi Arabia)	Salman Hazazi*	0	0	0	0	0	0	0	0
13	DF	(Saudi Arabia)	Hassan Kadesh	29	0	25	0	3	0	1	0
15	MF	(Saudi Arabia)	Nasser Al-Abdeli	4	0	0+3	0	0+1	0	0	0
16	FW	(Saudi Arabia)	Yousef Al-Salem	17	3	5+10	3	1+1	0	0	0
17	MF	(Guinea)	Boubacar Fofana*	12	1	11	1	0	0	1	0
18	MF	(Saudi Arabia)	Abdulaziz Al-Nashi	16	0	6+8	0	2	0	0	0
19	FW	(Saudi Arabia)	Marei Al-Moqaadi*	6	1	2+4	1	0	0	0	0
20	MF	(Saudi Arabia)	Jaber Al-Ziyadi*	1	0	0	0	0	0	1	0
21	FW	(Bolivia)	Yasmani Duk	2	0	2	0	0	0	0	0
22	MF	(Spain)	Juanmi Callejón	13	1	9+2	1	1+1	0	0	0
23	MF	(Saudi Arabia)	Hassan Al-Habib	14	0	3+10	0	1	0	0	0
24	DF	(Saudi Arabia)	Jamaan Al-Dossari	26	1	23	1	2	0	1	0
25	MF	(Saudi Arabia)	Saleh Al-Amri	24	3	17+4	2	3	1	0	0
26	MF	(Saudi Arabia)	Ali Al-Zaqaan*	11	1	7+3	1	0	0	1	0
27	MF	(Saudi Arabia)	Osama Al-Khalaf	5	0	2+3	0	0	0	0	0
28	GK	(Saudi Arabia)	Ahmed Al-Kassar	28	0	25	0	3	0	0	0
29	DF	(Saudi Arabia)	Osama Al-Saleem	1	0	1	0	0	0	0	0
30	GK	(Saudi Arabia)	Abdullah Al-Saleh	1	0	0	0	0	0	1	0
31	DF	(Saudi Arabia)	Mohammed Al-Zubaidi	1	0	1	0	0	0	0	0
33	DF	(Saudi Arabia)	Saad Al Khairi	2	0	1	0	1	0	0	0
34	MF	(Saudi Arabia)	Abdurahman Al-Aboud	3	0	1+1	0	1	0	0	0
35	MF	(Saudi Arabia)	Abdulaziz Majrashi	6	1	5	1	1	0	0	0
37	DF	(Saudi Arabia)	Abdulaziz Waseli	0	0	0	0	0	0	0	0
40	FW	(Nigeria)	Michael Eneramo	5	1	5	1	0	0	0	0
77	MF	(Saudi Arabia)	Ahmed Al-Shehri	0	0	0	0	0	0	0	0

=== Goalscorers ===
Rank	No.	Pos	Nat	Name	Pro League	King Cup	Crown Prince Cup	Total
1	9	FW	(Saudi Arabia)	Hazaa Al-Hazaa	5	1	0	6
2	7	MF	(Saudi Arabia)	Mohammed Al-Kwikbi	5	0	0	5
3	8	MF	(Saudi Arabia)	Mohamed Kanno	3	1	0	4
4	16	FW	(Saudi Arabia)	Yousef Al-Salem	3	0	0	3
4	25	FW	(Saudi Arabia)	Saleh Al-Amri	2	1	0	3
6	3	DF	(Cameroon)	Aminou Bouba	1	1	0	2
6	4	DF	(Burkina Faso)	Mohamed Koffi	1	1	0	2
8	10	FW	(Brazil)	Leo	1	0	0	1
8	11	FW	(Saudi Arabia)	Mohammed Al-Saiari	1	0	0	1
8	17	MF	(Guinea)	Boubacar Fofana	1	0	0	1
8	19	FW	(Saudi Arabia)	Marei Al-Moqaadi	1	0	0	1
8	22	MF	(Spain)	Juanmi Callejón	1	0	0	1
8	24	DF	(Saudi Arabia)	Jamaan Al-Dossari	1	0	0	1
8	26	MF	(Saudi Arabia)	Ali Al-Zaqaan	1	0	0	1
8	35	MF	(Saudi Arabia)	Abdulaziz Majrashi	1	0	0	1
8	40	FW	(Nigeria)	Michael Eneramo	1	0	0	1
Own goal					2	0	0	2
Total					31	5	0	36

Last Updated: 29 April 2017

=== Clean sheets ===
Rank	No.	Pos	Nat	Name	Pro League	King Cup	Crown Prince Cup	Total
1	28	GK	(Saudi Arabia)	Ahmed Al-Kassar	3	2	0	5
Total					3	2	0	5

Last Updated: 28 February 2017
