= 2012 Emir of Qatar Cup =

Tournament details
- Country: Qatar
- Dates: 15 April - 12 May
- Teams: 18

Final positions
- Champions: Al-Gharafa
- Runners-up: Al-Sadd

The 2012 Emir of Qatar Cup was the 40th edition of a men's football tournament in Qatar. It was played by the 1st and 2nd level divisions of the Qatari football league structure.

The top four sides of the 2011–12 Qatar Stars League season entered at the quarter-final stage.

The cup winner is guaranteed a place in the 2013 AFC Champions League.

== Round 1 ==
The first round of the competition involves four teams from the 2nd tier league.

Team 1	Score	Team 2
15 April 2012
Al-Shamal	5–3	Al-Markhiya
Al-Mesaimeer	1–4	Al-Shahaniya

=== Match details ===
April 15, 2012
17:15 (UTC+03:00)

Al-Shamal	5 – 3	Al-Markhiya
Ali Ferydoon 33', 38'; Nadson Rodriguez 47', 59'; Renan Oliveira 62'	Report	Marzouk Al-Otaibi 43', 64'; Qadr Mousa 85'

Thani bin Jassim Stadium, Doha

April 15, 2012
17:15 (UTC+03:00)

Al-Mesaimeer	1 – 4	Al-Shahaniya
Khalid Mesbah 87'	Report	Dami Junior 15'; Sérgio Ricardo 17'; Vanderson Silva 75', 79'

Thani bin Jassim Stadium, Doha
- Al Shamal and Al Shahaniya advance to round 2

== Round 2 ==
Team 1	Score	Team 2
23 April 2012
Al Arabi	1–0	Al-Sailiya
Umm Salal	4–1	Al-Shamal
Al Ahli	6–2	Al-Mu'aidar
Qatar SC	1–0	Al-Shahaniya

=== Match details ===
April 23, 2012
17:15 (UTC+03:00)

Al Arabi	1 – 0	Al-Sailiya
Arafat Djako 86'	Report

Jassim Bin Hamad Stadium, Doha

April 23, 2012
17:15 (UTC+03:00)

Umm Salal	4 – 1	Al-Shamal
Saleh Allhyar (red card) 12'; Magno Alves 3'; Cabore 70', 86', 93' (pen)	Report	Hafiz Abdul Salam 13' (pen)

Grand Hamad Stadium, Doha

April 23, 2012
19:45 (UTC+03:00)

Al Ahli	6 – 2	Al-Mu'aidar
Dioko Kaluyituka 57', 79'; Adel Ahmed 65', 83'; Hicham Aboucherouane 71', 75'	Report	Jean-Paul Eale 61', 76'

Jassim Bin Hamad Stadium, Doha

April 23, 2012
19:45 (UTC+03:00)

Qatar SC	1 – 0	Al-Shahaniya
Sebastián Soria 77'	Report

Grand Hamad Stadium, Doha
- Al Arabi, Al Ahli, Qatar SC and Umm Salal advance to round 3

== Round 3 ==
Team 1	Score	Team 2
27 April 2012
Al-Gharafa	2–0	Al Arabi
Al-Wakrah	1–1 (4-2p)	Umm Salal
Al Kharitiyath	4–2	Al Ahli
Al-Khor	2–1	Qatar SC

=== Match details ===
April 27, 2012
17:15 (UTC+03:00)

Al-Gharafa	2 – 0	Al Arabi
Moayed Hassan 42'; Farhad Majidi 90+4'

Thani bin Jassim Stadium, Doha

April 27, 2012
17:15 (UTC+03:00)

Al-Wakrah	1 – 1 4 – 3 (pen)	Umm Salal
Nashat Akram 30'		Cabore 1'

Al-Wakrah Stadium, Al Wakrah

April 27, 2012
19:45 (UTC+03:00)

Al Kharitiyath	4 – 2	Al Ahli
Yahia Kébé 39' (pen); Onyekachi Okonkwo 42'; Abdullah Abdulrahman 65'; Mahmoud Saad 85'		Solaiman Al-Nasr 7' (og); Dioko Kaluyituka 46'

Ahmed bin Ali Stadium, Al Rayyan

April 27, 2012
19:45 (UTC+03:00)

Al-Khor	2 – 1	Qatar SC
Madson 63'; Mohammed Jumaa 90'	Report	Sebastián Soria 16'

Al-Khawr Stadium, Al Khor
- Al Khor, Al Gharafa, Al-Wakrah and Al Kharitiyath advance to quarter-finals

== Quarter-finals ==
The top four league finishers enter at this stage

Team 1	Score	Team 2
5 May 2012
Lekhwiya	1–2	Al-Gharafa
Al-Sadd	2–0	Al-Wakrah
Al-Rayyan	1–1 (1-3p)	Al Kharitiyath
El Jaish	1–1 (4-2p)	Al-Khor

=== Match details ===
May 5, 2012
17:30 (UTC+03:00)

Lekhwiya	1 – 2	Al-Gharafa
Moumouni Dagano 42'		Moayed Hassan 9'; Diego Tardelli 34'

May 5, 2012
17:30 (UTC+03:00)

Al-Sadd	2 – 0	Al-Wakrah
Wesam Rizik 10'; Yusef Ahmed 90+2'

Jassim Bin Hamad Stadium, Doha

May 5, 2012
20:00 (UTC+03:00)

Al-Rayyan	1 – 1 1 – 3 (pen)	Al Kharitiyath
Jaralla Al Marri 19'		Jaycee John Okwunwanne 28'

May 5, 2012
20:00 (UTC+03:00)

El Jaish	1 – 1 4 – 2 (pen)	Al-Khor
Adriano 21'		Serigne Abdulkader 72'

- El Jaish, Al Gharafa, Al Sadd and Al Kharitiyath advance to quarter-finals

== Semi-finals ==
Team 1	Score	Team 2
8 May 2012
Al-Sadd	3–0	El Jaish
Al-Gharafa	1–1 (4-3p)	Al Kharitiyath

== Final ==
Team 1	Score	Team 2
12 May 2012
Al-Gharafa	0 - 0 (4-3p)	Al-Sadd
