= Ahmed Al-Kassar =

Saudi Arabian footballer (born 1991)

Personal information
- Full name: Ahmed Ali Al-Kassar
- Date of birth: 8 May 1991 (age 35)
- Place of birth: Qatif, Saudi Arabia
- Height: 1.79 m (5 ft 10 in)
- Position: Goalkeeper

Team information
- Current team: Al-Qadsiah
- Number: 28

Youth career
- Al-Taraji

Senior career*
Years	Team	Apps	(Gls)
2009–2015	Al-Raed	86	(0)
2015–2018	Al-Ettifaq	63	(0)
2018–2023	Al-Faisaly	54	(0)
2023–2024	Al-Fayha	1	(0)
2024–	Al-Qadsiah	6	(0)

International career^{‡}
2011–2013	Saudi Arabia U23		
2024–	Saudi Arabia	9	(0)
- * Club domestic league appearances and goals as of 30 October 2026 ‡ National team caps and goals as of 6 June 2026

Ahmed Ali Al-Kassar (Arabic: أحمد علي الكسار; born 8 May 1991) is a Saudi Arabian footballer who plays as a goalkeeper for Saudi Arabian club Al-Qadsiah and the Saudi Arabia national team.

== Club career ==
=== Al-Raed ===
On 19 June 2009, Al-Raed signed with Ahmed Al-Kassar from Al-Taraji for 1.8 million Saudi Riyals. He left in 2015 to go to Al-Ettifaq.

=== Al-Ettifaq ===
On 10 September 2015, Al-Ettifaq signed with Ahmed from Al-Raed. He won the Saudi First Division in his first season. On 18 August 2017, Ahmed Al-Kassar made a last-minute assist for Hazaa Al-Hazaa to help Al-Ettifaq draw 2–2 against Al-Nassr. He became only the fifth goalkeeper to make an assist in the Saudi Professional League. After the match, he said that manager Miodrag Ješić did not want him to go forward, but he ignored that and made the assist.

=== Al-Fayha ===
On 20 June 2023, Al-Kassar joined Al-Fayha on a free transfer.

=== Al-Qadsiah ===
On 30 January 2024, Al-Kassar joined Al-Qadsiah on a three-and-a-half-year deal.

== International Career ==
On 31 May 2026, he was named in the 26-man squad for the 2026 FIFA World Cup.

== Career statistics ==
=== Club ===
As of match played 31 May 2024

Club	Season	League		King Cup		Asia		Other		Total	
Club	Season	Apps	Goals	Apps	Goals	Apps	Goals	Apps	Goals	Apps	Goals
Al-Raed	2009–10	0	0	—		—		0	0	0	0
Al-Raed	2010–11	3	0	—		—		1 (Note: Appearances in Crown Prince Cup)	0	4	0
Al-Raed	2011–12	14	0	—		—		1	0	15	0
Al-Raed	2012–13	17	0	1	0	—		0	0	18	0
Al-Raed	2013–14	26	0	2	0	—		3	0	31	0
Al-Raed	2014–15	26	0	1	0	—		2	0	29	0
Al-Raed	Total	86	0	4	0	0	0	7	0	97	0
Al-Ettifaq	2015–16	27	0	1	0	—		1	0	29	0
Al-Ettifaq	2016–17	26	0	3	0	—		0	0	29	0
Al-Ettifaq	2017–18	10	0	0	0	—		—		10	0
Al-Ettifaq	Total	63	0	4	0	0	0	1	0	68	0
Al-Faisaly	2018–19	0	0	2	0	—		—		2	0
Al-Faisaly	2019–20	2	0	2	0	—		—		4	0
Al-Faisaly	2020–21	3	0	4	0	—		—		7	0
Al-Faisaly	2021–22	16	0	0	0	1	0	0	0	17	0
Al-Faisaly	2022–23	33	0	—		1	0	—		34	0
Al-Faisaly	Total	54	0	8	0	2	0	0	0	64	0
Al-Fayha	2023–24	1	0	1	0	4	0	—		6	0
Al-Qadsiah	2023–24	2	0	0	0	—		—		2	0
Career totals		206	0	17	0	6	0	8	0	237	0

== Honours ==
Al-Ettifaq

- Saudi First Division: 2015–16

Al-Faisaly

- King Cup: 2020–21

Al-Qadsiah

- First Division League: 2023–24
