= Jamaan Al-Dossari =

Jamaan Al-Dossari may refer to:

- Jamaan Al-Dossari (footballer, born 1987), Saudi football player
- Jamaan Al-Dossari (footballer, born 1993), Saudi football player
