= 2013 WAFF Championship =

8th WAFF Championship, held in Qatar between 2013 and 2014

8th WAFF Championship for men

Tournament details
- Host country: Qatar
- Dates: 25 December 2013 – 7 January 2014
- Teams: 9
- Venue(s): 2 (in 2 host cities)

Final positions
- Champions: Qatar (1st title)
- Runners-up: Jordan
- Third place: Bahrain
- Fourth place: Kuwait

Tournament statistics
- Matches played: 13
- Goals scored: 17 (1.31 per match)
- Attendance: 37,830 (2,910 per match)
- Top scorer(s): (Qatar) Boualem Khoukhi (6 goals)

The 2013 West Asian Football Federation Championship (marketed as Qatar 2013) was the 8th WAFF Championship, an international tournament for member nations of the West Asian Football Federation. The tournament was hosted by Qatar from 25 December 2013 to 7 January 2014 and the host country won the tournament for the first time. The 2012 champions, Syria, did not defend their title.

== Venues ==
It was announced in October 2013 that three venues would be used, one in Al Rayyan and two in the capital Doha. On 4 December, it was announced that the Suheim bin Hamad Stadium (in Doha) would not feature in the tournament anymore.

Al Rayyan	Doha	Location of the host cities of the 2013 WAFF Championship.
Jassim bin Hamad Stadium (Al Sadd SC stadium)	Abdullah bin Khalifa Stadium (Lekhwiya SC stadium)	Location of the host cities of the 2013 WAFF Championship.
Capacity: 15,000	Capacity: 10,000	Location of the host cities of the 2013 WAFF Championship.

== Participating teams and Draw ==
The draw took place on 11 November 2013 in Doha, Qatar. The nine teams were drawn into three groups based on team rankings. All groups included three teams each.

Country	Appearance	Previous best performance
Bahrain	3rd	Fourth place (2012)
Iraq	7th	Champions (2002)
Jordan	8th	Runners-up (2002, 2008)
Kuwait	3rd	Champions (2010)
Lebanon	6th	Group stage (2000, 2002, 2004, 2007, 2012)
Oman	4th	Third place (2012)
Palestine	8th	Group stage (2000, 2002, 2004, 2007, 2008, 2010, 2012)
Qatar (hosts)	2nd	Semi-finals (2008)
Saudi Arabia	2nd	Group stage (2012)

Did not enter

- Iran
- United Arab Emirates

Withdrew

- Syria
- Yemen

== Match officials ==
The following is the list of referees the West Asian Football Federation appointed for the tournament.

Referees

- (Bahrain) Jameel Abdulhusin
- (China) Wang Di
- (Iraq) Ali Sabah Adday Al-Qaysi
- (Malaysia) Nagor Amir Noor Mohamed
- (Oman) Abdullah Al Hilali
- (Qatar) Banjar Al-Dosari
- (Saudi Arabia) Marai Al-Awaji
- (South Korea) Kim Sang-Woo
- (Uzbekistan) Valentin Kovalenko

Assistant referees

- (China) Mu Yuxin
- (Jordan) Issa Al-Amawe
- (Kuwait) Yaser Marad
- (Lebanon) Samer Badr
- (Malaysia) Mohd Kamil Tumin
- (Palestine) Amin Halabi
- (South Korea) Lee Jung-Min
- (Uzbekistan) Rafael Ilyasov

== Group stage ==
- All times listed are (UTC+3)

=== Group A ===
Pos	Team	Pld	W	D	L	GF	GA	GD	Pts
1	Qatar (H)	2	2	0	0	5	1	+4	6
2	Palestine	2	0	1	1	0	1	−1	1
3	Saudi Arabia	2	0	1	1	1	4	−3	1

(H) Hosts
25 December 2013
17:30

Qatar	1–0	Palestine
Hassan 90'	Report

Jassim bin Hamad Stadium, Al Rayyan
Attendance: 4,720
Referee: Wang Di (China PR)

28 December 2013
17:30

Palestine	0–0	Saudi Arabia
	Report

Abdullah bin Khalifa Stadium, Doha
Attendance: 400
Referee: Abdullah Al Hilali (Oman)

31 December 2013
17:30

Saudi Arabia	1–4	Qatar
Majrashi 31'	Report	Khouki 15', 55'; Ahmed 57', 62'

Jassim bin Hamad Stadium, Al Rayyan
Attendance: 5,720
Referee: Valentin Kovalenko (Uzbekistan)

=== Group B ===
Pos	Team	Pld	W	D	L	GF	GA	GD	Pts
1	Bahrain	2	0	2	0	0	0	0	2
2	Iraq	2	0	2	0	0	0	0	2
2	Oman	2	0	2	0	0	0	0	2

25 December 2013
20:00

Oman	0–0	Bahrain
	Report

Jassim bin Hamad Stadium, Al Rayyan
Attendance: 750
Referee: Banjar Al-Dosari (Qatar)

28 December 2013
20:00

Bahrain	0–0	Iraq
	Report

Abdullah bin Khalifa Stadium, Doha
Attendance: 400
Referee: Marai Al-Awaji (Saudi Arabia)

31 December 2013
20:00

Iraq	0–0	Oman
	Report

Jassim bin Hamad Stadium, Al Rayyan
Attendance: 450
Referee: Nagor Amir Noor Mohamed (Malaysia)
- Drawing of lots was used to determine the group winners. The draw was conducted after the final game in Group C. No determination was made by the organisers for second and third place.

=== Group C ===
Pos	Team	Pld	W	D	L	GF	GA	GD	Pts
1	Jordan	2	1	1	0	2	1	+1	4
2	Kuwait	2	1	0	1	3	2	+1	3
3	Lebanon	2	0	1	1	0	2	−2	1

26 December 2013
17:30

Jordan	0–0	Lebanon
	Report

Abdullah bin Khalifa Stadium, Doha
Attendance: 4,320
Referee: Ali Sabah Adday Al-Qaysi (Iraq)

29 December 2013
17:30

Lebanon	0–2	Kuwait
	Report	Al-Hajeri 41'; Zaid 85'

Jassim bin Hamad Stadium, Al Rayyan
Attendance: 400
Referee: Jameel Abdulhusin (Bahrain)

1 January 2014
17:30

Kuwait	1–2	Jordan
Al-Hajeri 20' (pen.)	Report	Murjan 12'; Al-Dmeiri 72'

Abdullah bin Khalifa Stadium, Doha
Attendance: 3,100
Referee: Kim Sang-Woo (South Korea)

=== Ranking of second-placed teams ===
At the end of the group stage, a comparison will be made between the second-placed teams of each group. The best second-placed team advance to the semifinals.

Pos	Grp	Team	Pld	W	D	L	GF	GA	GD	Pts
1	C	Kuwait	2	1	0	1	3	2	+1	3
2	B	undetermined (Note: Iraq and Oman finished group B with an identical record, and equal claim on second place in the group. When the group winner was determined by a draw, the identity of second place was irrelevant, as qualification for the team coming second in this group was impossible, so no draw for second place took place.)	2	0	2	0	0	0	0	2
3	A	Palestine	2	0	1	1	0	1	−1	1

== Knockout stage ==
Semi-finals
4 January 2014 – Doha
Qatar (a.e.t.)	3
Kuwait	0
4 January 2014 – Doha
Bahrain	0
Jordan	1

Final
7 January 2014 – Al Rayyan
Qatar	2
Jordan	0
Third place
7 January 2014 – Al Rayyan
Kuwait	0 (2)
Bahrain (pen.)	0 (3)

=== Semi-finals ===
4 January 2014
17:30

Qatar	3–0 (a.e.t.)	Kuwait
Khouki 93', 112'; Assadalla 120'	Report

Abdullah bin Khalifa Stadium, Doha
Attendance: 3,400
Referee: Abdullah Al Hilali (Oman)

4 January 2014
20:30

Bahrain	0–1	Jordan
	Report	Duaij 67' (o.g.)

Abdullah bin Khalifa Stadium, Doha
Attendance: 4,000
Referee: Ali Sabah Adday Al-Qaysi (Iraq)

=== 3rd Place Match ===
7 January 2014
16:15

Kuwait	0–0 (a.e.t.)	Bahrain
	Report
Penalties
	2–3

Jassim bin Hamad Stadium, Al Rayyan
Attendance: 1,450
Referee: Banjar Al-Dosari (Qatar)

=== Final ===
7 January 2014
19:00

Qatar	2–0	Jordan
Khoukhi 52', 81'	Report

Jassim bin Hamad Stadium, Al Rayyan
Attendance: 8,720
Referee: Valentin Kovalenko (Uzbekistan)

=== Winners ===
2013 WAFF Championship winners

Qatar
1st title

== Player awards ==
- Best Player: (Qatar) Ali Assadalla
- Top Scorer: (Qatar) Boualem Khoukhi
- Best Goalkeeper: (Bahrain) Sayed Mohammed Jaffer

== Statistics ==
=== Goalscorers ===
6 goals

- (Qatar) Boualem Khoukhi

2 goals

- (Kuwait) Fahad Al-Hajeri
- (Qatar) Adel Ahmed

1 goal

- (Jordan) Mohammad Al-Dmeiri
- (Jordan) Saeed Murjan
- (Kuwait) Faisal Zaid
- (Qatar) Ali Assadalla
- (Qatar) Moayad Hassan
- (Saudi Arabia) Mohammed Majrashi

Own goal

- (Bahrain) Mohamed Duaij (playing against Jordan)

=== Final standings ===
Pos	Team	Pld	W	D	L	GF	GA	GD	Result
1	Qatar	4	4	0	0	10	1	+9	
2	Jordan	4	2	1	1	3	3	0	
3	Bahrain	4	0	3	1	0	1	−1	
4	Kuwait	4	1	1	2	3	5	−2	
5	Iraq	2	0	2	0	0	0	0	Eliminated in the group stage
5	Oman	2	0	2	0	0	0	0	Eliminated in the group stage
7	Palestine	2	0	1	1	0	1	−1	Eliminated in the group stage
8	Lebanon	2	0	1	1	0	2	−2	Eliminated in the group stage
9	Saudi Arabia	2	0	1	1	1	4	−3	Eliminated in the group stage

Note: As per statistical convention in football, matches decided in extra time are counted as wins and losses, while matches decided by penalty shoot-outs are counted as draws.
