= Abdulrahman Al-Aboud =

Saudi Arabian footballer

Personal information
- Full name: Abdulrahman Ali Hassan Al-Aboud
- Date of birth: 1 June 1995 (age 31)
- Place of birth: Dammam, Saudi Arabia
- Height: 1.74 m (5 ft 9 in)
- Position: Winger

Team information
- Current team: Al-Shabab
- Number: 24

Senior career*
Years	Team	Apps	(Gls)
2014–2019	Al-Ettifaq	53	(3)
2016–2017	→ Al-Orobah (loan)	6	(0)
2019–2026	Al-Ittihad	136	(13)
2024	→ Al-Ettifaq (loan)	7	(0)
2026–	Al-Shabab	6	(0)

International career^{‡}
2018–	Saudi Arabia	18	(2)
- * Club domestic league appearances and goals as of 21:11, 30 October 2026 (UTC) ‡ National team caps and goals as of 20:41, 15 December 2025 (UTC)

Abdulrahman Ali Hassan Al-Aboud (Arabic: عبد الرحمن علي حسان العبود; born 1 June 1995) is a Saudi football player who plays as a winger for Al-Shabab. He has also played for the Saudi Arabia national team.

== Career ==
Al-Aboud began his career with Al-Ettifaq where he was promoted from the youth team to the first team. He made his debut during the 2014–15 season. On July 18, 2016, he was loaned out to First Division side Al-Orobah. His loan was cut short and Al-Aboud was recalled in January 2017. On 25 June 2017, Al-Aboud renewed his contract with Al-Ettifaq until 2022. On 15 April 2018, he renewed his contract with the club until 2023. On 4 July 2019, Al-Aboud joined Al-Ittihad on a four-year contract. On 6 October 2022, Al-Aboud renewed his contract with Al-Ittihad until 2026. On 17 January 2024, Al-Aboud joined Al-Ettifaq on a six-month loan.

== Career statistics ==
As of match played 30 May 2025

Club	Season	League			King's Cup		Continental		Other		Total	
Club	Season	Division	Apps	Goals	Apps	Goals	Apps	Goals	Apps	Goals	Apps	Goals
Al-Ettifaq	2014–15	Saudi First Division	7	0	1	0	—		2 (Note: Appearances in Crown Prince Cup)	0	10	0
Al-Ettifaq	2015–16	Saudi First Division	0	0	0	0	—		0	0	0	0
Al-Ettifaq	2016–17	Saudi Pro League	2	0	1	0	—		0	0	3	0
Al-Ettifaq	2017–18	Saudi Pro League	22	3	1	0	—		—		23	3
Al-Ettifaq	2018–19	Saudi Pro League	22	0	4	1	—		—		26	1
Al-Ettifaq	Total		53	3	7	1	0	0	2	0	62	4
Al-Orobah (loan)	2016–17	Saudi First Division	6	0	0	0	—		1	1	7	1
Al-Ittihad	2019–20	Saudi Pro League	20	0	2	0	1 (Note: Appearances in AFC Champions League)	0	3 (Note: Appearances in Arab Club Champions Cup)	0	26	0
Al-Ittihad	2020–21	Saudi Pro League	23	3	2	0	—		1	0	26	3
Al-Ittihad	2021–22	Saudi Pro League	26	2	3	0	—		1	0	30	2
Al-Ittihad	2022–23	Saudi Pro League	21	0	2	0	—		2 (Note: Appearances in Saudi Super Cup)	0	25	0
Al-Ittihad	2023–24	Saudi Pro League	3	0	0	0	2	0	0	0	5	0
Al-Ittihad	2024–25	Saudi Pro League	29	7	5	1	—		—		34	8
Al-Ittihad	Total		121	12	14	1	3	0	7	0	146	13
Al-Ettifaq (loan)	2023–24	Saudi Pro League	7	0	0	0	—		—		7	0
Career total			188	15	21	2	3	0	10	1	222	18

=== International goals ===
No.	Date	Venue	Opponent	Score	Result	Competition
1.	5 June 2025	Bahrain National Stadium, Riffa, Bahrain	Bahrain	2–0	2–0	2026 FIFA World Cup qualification
2.	10 June 2025	King Abdullah Sports City, Jeddah, Saudi Arabia	Australia	1–0	1–2	2026 FIFA World Cup qualification

== Honours ==
Al-Ittihad

- Saudi Pro League: 2022–23, 2024–25
- King's Cup: 2024–25
- Saudi Super Cup: 2022
