= Saad Al-Khayri =

Saudi Arabian footballer

Saad Al Khayri سعد آل خيري
Personal information
- Full name: Saad Saeed Al Khayri Al-Yami
- Date of birth: 21 June 1995 (age 31)
- Place of birth: Saudi Arabia
- Height: 1.70 m (5 ft 7 in)
- Position: Right-back

Team information
- Current team: Al-Safa
- Number: 50

Youth career
- 2012–2016: Al-Ettifaq

Senior career*
Years	Team	Apps	(Gls)
2015–2022	Al-Ettifaq	48	(0)
2016–2017	→ Al-Orobah (loan)	9	(0)
2020–2021	→ Al-Batin (loan)	25	(0)
2022–2025	Al-Wehda	0	(0)
2024	→ Al-Safa (loan)	2	(0)
2025–	Al-Safa		

International career^{‡}
2011–2012	Saudi Arabia U17		
2013–2015	Saudi Arabia U20		
2015–2017	Saudi Arabia U23		
- * Club domestic league appearances and goals as of 17 May 2019 ‡ National team caps and goals as of 17 May 2019

Saad Al Khayri (Arabic: سعد آل خيري, born 21 June 1995) is a Saudi Arabian professional footballer who plays as a right-back for Al-Safa.

== Career ==
Al Khayri began his career with Al-Ettifaq where he was promoted from the youth team to the first team. On July 18, 2016, he was loaned out to First Division side Al-Orobah for 6 months. On August 31, 2017, he signed a 5-year contract with Al-Ettifaq tying him to the club until 2023. On 25 September 2020, Al Khayri joined Al-Batin on a season-long loan. On 1 September 2022, Al Khayri joined Al-Wehda on a three-year contract. On 1 February 2024, Al Khayri joined First Division side Al-Safa on a six-month loan.

== Career statistics ==
=== Club ===
As of 30 June 2022

Club	Season	League			Kings Cup		Cup (Note: Discontinued in September 19, 2017)		Total	
Club	Season	Division	Apps	Goals	Apps	Goals	Apps	Goals	Apps	Goals
Al-Ettifaq	2014–15	First Division	4	0	2	1	0	0	6	1
Al-Ettifaq	2015–16	First Division	0	0	0	0	0	0	0	0
Al-Ettifaq	2016–17	Pro League	1	0	1	0	0	0	2	0
Al-Ettifaq	2017–18	Pro League	21	0	0	0	0	0	21	0
Al-Ettifaq	2018–19	Pro League	3	0	1	0	–	–	4	0
Al-Ettifaq	2019–20	Pro League	13	0	1	0	–	–	14	0
Al-Ettifaq	2021–22	Pro League	6	0	0	0	–	–	6	0
Al-Ettifaq Total			48	0	5	1	0	0	53	1
Al-Orobah (loan)	2016–17	First Division	9	0	0	0	1	0	10	0
Al-Batin (loan)	2020–21	Pro League	25	0	1	0	–	–	26	0
Career Total			82	0	6	1	1	0	89	1
