= Mohammed Al-Kuwaykibi =

Saudi Arabian footballer (born 1994)

Personal information
- Full name: Mohammed Marzoq Al-Kuwaykibi Al-Ruwaili
- Date of birth: 2 December 1994 (age 31)
- Place of birth: Sakakah, Saudi Arabia
- Height: 1.69 m (5 ft 7 in)
- Position: Winger

Team information
- Current team: Al-Taawoun
- Number: 7

Youth career
- Al-Orobah

Senior career*
Years	Team	Apps	(Gls)
2012–2016	Al-Orobah	56	(9)
2013	→ Al-Entelaq (loan)	3	(1)
2016–2024	Al-Ettifaq	176	(32)
2024	→ Al-Taawoun (loan)	15	(3)
2024–	Al-Taawoun	48	(4)

International career^{‡}
2014–2017	Saudi Arabia U23		
2018–	Saudi Arabia	10	(0)
- * Club domestic league appearances and goals as of 18 November 2026 ‡ National team caps and goals as of 22:30, 17 November 2026 (UTC)

Mohammed Marzoq Al-Kuwaykibi Al-Ruwaili (Arabic: محمد مرزوق الكويكبي الرويلي; born 2 December 1994) is a Saudi professional footballer who plays a winger for Al-Taawoun. In May 2018 he was named in Saudi Arabia's preliminary squad for the 2018 World Cup in Russia.

== Career ==
Al-Kuwaykibi started his career at hometown club Al-Orobah and made his first-team debut during the 2012–13 season. He scored his first goal for Al-Orobah in the Crown Prince Cup match against Al-Tadamon on 4 October 2012. He scored his first league goal for the club on 9 November 2012 against Al-Hazem.

On 27 April 2013, Al-Kuwaykibi was loaned out to Al-Entelaq who were participating in the Third Division promotion play-offs. On 8 August 2014, Al-Kuwaykibi made his Pro League debut for Al-Orobah against Al-Hilal. On 28 November 2015, Al-Kuwaykibi scored his first career hattrick in a 4–1 win against Al-Fayha.

On 14 June 2016, Al-Kuwaykibi signed a five-year contract with Pro League club Al-Ettifaq. He made his debut on 14 August 2016 in a 4–1 loss away to Al-Ahli. On 21 September 2016, Al-Kuwaykibi scored his first goal for Al-Ettifaq in a 2–1 win against Al-Batin. He ended his first season at the club scoring 5 goals in 27 appearances in all competitions. In his second season, Al-Kuwaykibi scored 5 goals in 26 appearances as he helped Al-Ettifaq finish fourth.

On 31 January 2020, Al-Kuwaykibi renewed his contract with Al-Ettifaq until 2024. On 31 January 2024, Al-Kuwaykibi joined Al-Taawoun on a six-month loan. On 30 May 2024, Al-Kuwaykibi joined Al-Taawoun on a three-year deal.

== Career statistics ==
=== Club ===
As of 27 May 2024.

Club	Season	League			Cup		Continental		Other		Total	
Club	Season	Division	Apps	Goals	Apps	Goals	Apps	Goals	Apps	Goals	Apps	Goals
Al-Orobah	2012–13	SFD	6	1	–		–		3 (Note: Appearances in Crown Prince Cup)	2	9	3
Al-Orobah	2013–14	SPL	0	0	0	0	–		0	0	0	0
Al-Orobah	2014–15	SPL	22	0	1	1	–		3	0	26	1
Al-Orobah	2015–16	SFD	28	8	3	1	–		2	0	33	9
Al-Orobah	Total		56	9	4	2	0	0	8	2	68	13
Al-Entelaq (loan)	2012–13	Third Division	3	1	–		–		–		3	1
Al-Ettifaq	2016–17	SPL	23	5	3	0	–		1	0	27	5
Al-Ettifaq	2017–18	SPL	24	5	2	0	–		–		26	5
Al-Ettifaq	2018–19	SPL	25	6	2	2	–		–		27	8
Al-Ettifaq	2019–20	SPL	22	2	3	3	–		–		25	5
Al-Ettifaq	2020–21	SPL	25	8	1	0	–		–		26	8
Al-Ettifaq	2021–22	SPL	18	3	0	0	–		–		18	3
Al-Ettifaq	2022–23	SPL	23	2	1	0	–		–		24	2
Al-Ettifaq	2023–24	SPL	16	1	2	1	–		–		18	2
Al-Ettifaq	Total		176	32	14	7	0	0	1	0	191	38
Al Taawoun	2023–24	SPL	15	3	–		–		–		15	3
Career total			250	45	18	9	0	0	9	2	277	56

== Honours ==
Al-Orobah

- Saudi First Division: 2012–13
