= Hassan Al-Habib =

Saudi Arabian footballer

Personal information
- Full name: Hassan Jamal Al-Habib
- Date of birth: September 14, 1994 (age 32)
- Place of birth: Al-Hasa, Saudi Arabia
- Height: 1.85 m (6 ft 1 in)
- Position: Midfielder

Team information
- Current team: Al-Tai
- Number: 15

Youth career
- –2013: Al-Adalah
- 2013–2014: Al-Ettifaq

Senior career*
Years	Team	Apps	(Gls)
2014–2019	Al-Ettifaq	59	(6)
2019–2020	Al-Hazem	19	(1)
2020–2023	Al-Fateh	26	(0)
2022–2023	→ Al-Adalah (loan)	23	(0)
2023–2024	Al-Okhdood	14	(1)
2024–2025	Al-Diriyah	13	(0)
2025–	Al-Tai	0	(0)

International career^{‡}
2019–	Saudi Arabia	2	(0)
- * Club domestic league appearances and goals as of 27 May 2024 ‡ National team caps and goals as of 25 March 2019

Hassan Al-Habib (Arabic: حسن الحبيب; born 14 September 1994) is a Saudi professional footballer who plays as a midfielder for Al-Tai.

== Career ==
On 15 July 2019, Al-Habib joined Al-Hazem on a three-year deal. On 17 September 2020, Al-Habib joined Al-Fateh on a three-year deal. On 20 August 2022, Al-Habib joined Al-Adalah on a one-year loan. On 19 August 2023, Al-Habib joined Al-Okhdood on a free transfer. On 25 July 2024, Al-Habib joined Al-Diriyah. On 10 September 2025, Al-Habib joined Al-Tai.

== Career statistics ==
=== Club ===
As of 27 May 2024

Club	Season	League			King Cup		Crown Prince Cup (Note: Discontinued in September 19, 2017)		Total	
Club	Season	Division	Apps	Goals	Apps	Goals	Apps	Goals	Apps	Goals
Al-Ettifaq	2014–15	First Division	10	0	0	0	2	0	12	0
Al-Ettifaq	2015–16	First Division	12	3	1	0	1	0	14	3
Al-Ettifaq	2016–17	Pro League	13	0	1	0	0	0	14	0
Al-Ettifaq	2017–18	Pro League	6	0	1	0	—		7	0
Al-Ettifaq	2018–19	Pro League	18	3	2	0	—		20	3
Al-Ettifaq	Club Total		59	6	5	0	3	0	67	6
Al-Hazem	2019–20	Pro League	19	1	0	0	—		19	1
Al-Fateh	2020–21	Pro League	20	0	3	0	—		23	0
Al-Fateh	2021–22	Pro League	6	0	0	0	—		6	0
Al-Fateh	Club Total		26	0	3	0	0	0	29	0
Al-Adalah (loan)	2022–23	Pro League	23	0	1	0	—		24	0
Al-Okhdood	2023–24	Pro League	14	1	1	0	—		15	1
Career Total			141	8	10	0	3	0	154	8
