= Mohamed Kanno =

Saudi Arabian footballer (born 1994)

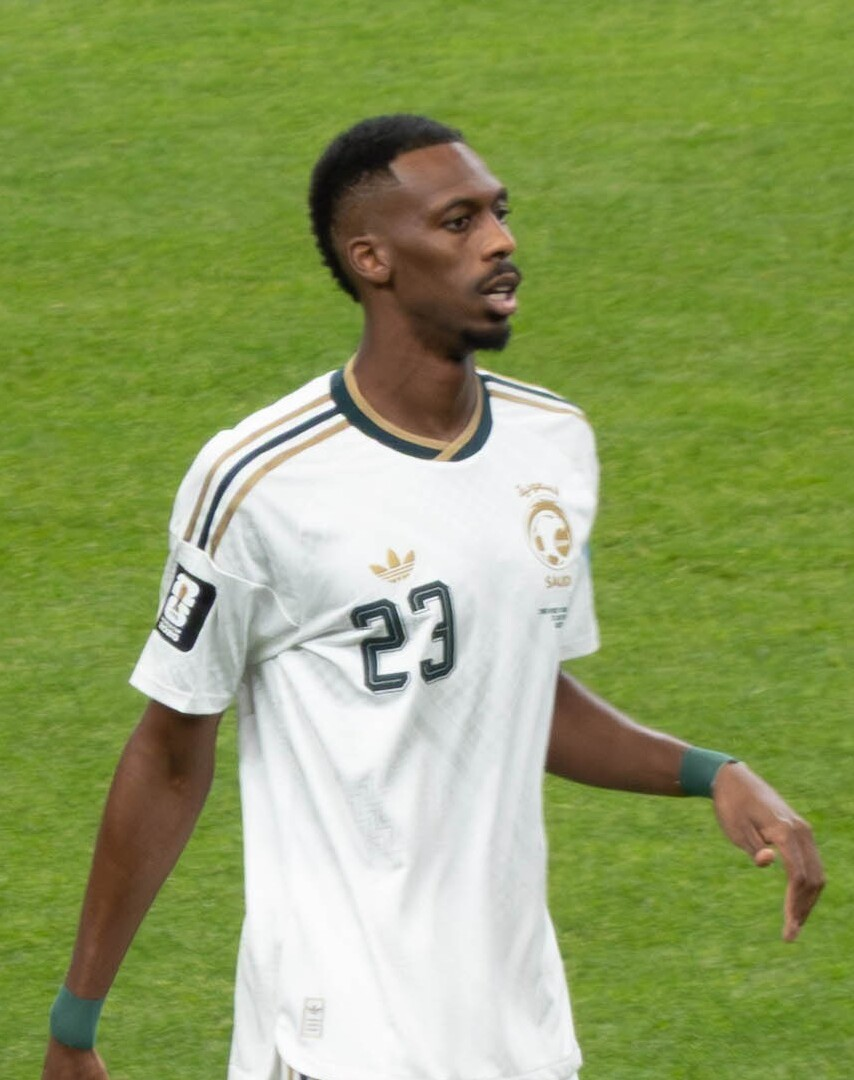
- Kanno playing for Saudi Arabia at the 2026 FIFA World Cup

Personal information
- Full name: Mohamed Ibrahim Abdullah Kanno
- Date of birth: 22 September 1994 (age 32)
- Place of birth: Khobar, Saudi Arabia
- Height: 1.92 m (6 ft 4 in)
- Position: Midfielder

Team information
- Current team: Al Hilal
- Number: 28

Senior career*
Years	Team	Apps	(Gls)
2013–2017	Al-Ettifaq	67	(14)
2017–	Al Hilal	222	(22)

International career^{‡}
2016–2017	Saudi Arabia U23	5	(1)
2017–	Saudi Arabia	88	(9)
- * Club domestic league appearances and goals as of 31 October 2026 (UTC) ‡ National team caps and goals as of 18:48, 17 November 2026 (UTC)

Mohamed Ibrahim Abdullah Kanno (Arabic: محمد إبراهيم عبد الله كنو; born 22 September 1994) is a Saudi Arabian professional footballer who plays as a midfielder for Saudi Pro League club Al Hilal and the Saudi Arabia national team.

== Club career ==
=== Ettifaq ===
Kanno was playing at Ettifaq in 2013–2017, who were relegated in 2014. In 2016, Kanno helped his team get back into the league. He left in 2017 to join Al-Hilal.

=== Al-Hilal ===
On 3 July 2017, Kanno moved to Al-Hilal on a five-year contract.

== International career ==
In May 2018, he was named in Saudi Arabia's preliminary squad for the 2018 FIFA World Cup in Russia.

At the 2022 FIFA World Cup, he started all three group stage matches for Saudi Arabia. Despite defeating eventual champion Argentina in their first match, Saudi Arabia finished fourth in their group and did not advance to the knockout stage.

On 31 May 2026, he was named in the 26-man squad for the 2026 FIFA World Cup.

== Career statistics ==
=== Club ===
As of 27 May 2026

Appearances and goals by club, season and competition
Club	Season	League			King's Cup		Crown Prince Cup (Note: Discontinued in September 2017)		Continental		Other		Total	
Club	Season	Division	Apps	Goals	Apps	Goals	Apps	Goals	Apps	Goals	Apps	Goals	Apps	Goals
Al-Ettifaq	2013–14	Saudi Pro League	16	3	5	2	2	1	—		—		23	6
Al-Ettifaq	2014–15	Saudi First Division	6	2	0	0	2	1	—		—		8	3
Al-Ettifaq	2015–16	Saudi First Division	26	6	0	0	2	0	—		—		28	6
Al-Ettifaq	2016–17	Saudi Pro League	19	3	2	1	1	0	—		—		22	4
Al-Ettifaq	Total		67	14	7	3	7	2	0	0	0	0	81	19
Al-Hilal	2017–18	Saudi Pro League	15	0	2	0	—		9	0	—		26	0
Al-Hilal	2018–19	Saudi Pro League	29	5	5	0	—		5	0	10 (Note: Eight appearances in Arab Club Champions Cup, one appearance in Saudi Super Cup, one appearance in Saudi-Egyptian Super Cup)	0	49	5
Al-Hilal	2019–20	Saudi Pro League	20	1	4	0	—		12	0	2 (Note: Appearances in FIFA Club World Cup)	0	38	1
Al-Hilal	2020–21	Saudi Pro League	22	3	1	0	—		6	0	1 (Note: Appearance in Saudi Super Cup)	0	30	3
Al-Hilal	2021–22	Saudi Pro League	16	1	1	0	—		9	1	4 (Note: Three appearances and one goal in FIFA Club World Cup, one appearance in Saudi Super Cup)	1	30	3
Al-Hilal	2022–23	Saudi Pro League	19	1	4	1	—		5	0	3 (Note: One appearance in Saudi Super Cup, two appearances and one goal in FIFA Club World Cup)	1	31	3
Al-Hilal	2023–24	Saudi Pro League	30	4	5	0	—		11	0	8 (Note: Six appearances and one goal in Arab Club Champions Cup, one appearance in Saudi Super Cup)	1	54	5
Al-Hilal	2024–25	Saudi Pro League	29	2	2	0	—		10	1	6 (Note: One appearance in Saudi Super Cup, five appearances in FIFA Club World Cup)	0	47	3
Al-Hilal	2025–26	Saudi Pro League	32	5	5	0	–—		7	0	—		44	5
Al-Hilal	Total		212	22	29	1	0	0	74	2	34	3	349	28
Career total			279	36	36	4	7	2	74	2	34	3	430	47

=== International ===
As of match played 17 November 2026

Appearances and goals by national team and year
National team	Year	Apps	Goals
Saudi Arabia	2017	2	0
Saudi Arabia	2018	7	1
Saudi Arabia	2019	6	0
Saudi Arabia	2020	2	0
Saudi Arabia	2021	8	0
Saudi Arabia	2022	16	0
Saudi Arabia	2023	6	1
Saudi Arabia	2024	17	3
Saudi Arabia	2025	10	3
Saudi Arabia	2026	14	1
Total		88	9

Scores and results list Saudi Arabia's goal tally first.

List of international goals scored by Mohamed Kanno
No.	Date	Venue	Opponent	Score	Result	Competition
1.	15 May 2018	La Cartuja, Seville, Spain	Greece	2–0	2–0	Friendly
2.	13 October 2023	Estádio Municipal de Portimão, Portimão, Portugal	Nigeria	2–2	2–2	Friendly
3.	21 January 2024	Ahmad bin Ali Stadium, Al Rayyan, Qatar	Kyrgyzstan	1–0	2–0	2023 AFC Asian Cup
4.	25 December 2024	Sulaibikhat Stadium, Sulaibikhat, Kuwait	Yemen	1–2	3–2	26th Arabian Gulf Cup
5.	31 December 2024	Sulaibikhat Stadium, Sulaibikhat, Kuwait	Oman	1–2	1–2	26th Arabian Gulf Cup
6.	5 December 2025	Al Bayt Stadium, Al Khor, Qatar	Comoros	1–0	3–1	2025 FIFA Arab Cup
7.	5 December 2025	Al Bayt Stadium, Al Khor, Qatar	Comoros	2–0	3–1	2025 FIFA Arab Cup
8.	11 December 2025	Lusail Stadium, Lusail, Qatar	Palestine	2–1	2–1 (a.e.t.)	2025 FIFA Arab Cup
9.	13 November 2026	Jassim bin Hamad Stadium, Al Rayyan, Qatar	South Korea	2–1	3–2	Friendly

== Honours ==
Al-Ettifaq

- Saudi First Division: 2015–16

Al-Hilal

- Pro League: 2017–18, 2019–20, 2020–21, 2021–22, 2023–24
- King Cup: 2019–20, 2022–23, 2023–24, 2025-26
- Saudi Super Cup: 2018, 2021, 2023, 2024
- AFC Champions League Elite: 2019, 2021

Individual

- Saudi Pro League Saudi Player of the Season: 2018–19
- IFFHS Asian Men's Team of the Year: 2025
