= Hazaa Al-Hazaa =

Saudi Arabian footballer

Personal information
- Full name: Hazaa Ibrahim Al-Hazaa
- Date of birth: August 8, 1991 (age 35)
- Place of birth: Dammam, Saudi Arabia
- Height: 1.75 m (5 ft 9 in)
- Position: Striker

Senior career*
Years	Team	Apps	(Gls)
2012–2022	Al-Ettifaq	134	(33)
2014	→ Al-Khaleej (loan)	4	(3)
2015	→ Al-Safa (loan)	11	(6)
2022	→ Al-Taawoun (loan)	4	(0)
2022–2024	Al-Tai	16	(0)

International career^{‡}
2017–	Saudi Arabia	3	(1)
- * Club domestic league appearances and goals as of 9 September 2020 (UTC) ‡ National team caps and goals as of 22 December 2017 (UTC)

Hazaa Ibrahim Al-Hazaa (Arabic: هزاع الهزاع, born 8 August 1991) is a Saudi football player who plays as a striker for the Saudi Arabia national football team.

Hazaa started his career with Al-Ettifaq, coming through the youth ranks to make his debut as a 21-year-old in February 2013 before joining Al-Khaleej and Al-Safa on loan in 2014 and 2015, respectively. In October 2017, he made his international bow, featuring in two friendly matches and scoring once.

== Career ==
=== Club career ===
Hazaa progressed through the youth ranks of Al-Ettifaq. After scoring 19 goals in the 2012–13 Saudi U-21 League, he made his senior debut at the age of 21 as a last-minute substitute in the 0–2 loss against Al-Nassr on February 18, 2013. He started his first game in the 1–1 draw against Al-Raed on April 18, 2013.

==== 2013–14 season ====
He found limited opportunities while Al-Ettifaq was struggling for form and fighting relegation, where he only made two 15 and 25-minute cameo appearances against Al-Nassr and Al-Raed, respectively.

On January 13, 2014, he was loaned out to spend the second half of the season at Al-Khaleej in the Saudi First Division, where he scored three goals and played a key role in their qualification to the Saudi Professional League. He opened his goal-scoring account with a brace in the 5–0 victory against Al-Kawkab.

==== 2014–15 season ====
He scored one goal in six appearances with Al-Ettifaq after they were relegated to the Saudi First Division for the first time in their history. His solitary goal came in the 2–1 win against Al-Safa on August 22, 2014.

During the second half of the season, Hazaa was loaned out on January 25, 2015, to Al-Safa, where his six goals could not prevent them from being relegated to the Saudi Second Division. He opened his record with a brace in the 3–1 win against Al-Nahda on February 13, 2015. On March 21, 2015, he scored his first hattrick in the 4–1 win against Al-Jeel.

==== 2015–16 season ====
Hazaa played a key role in aiding Al-Ettifaq to win the Saudi First Division and clinch promotion to the Saudi Professional League, scoring eight goals in 19 appearances. During the first half of the season, he was largely deployed as a winger. On January 30, 2016, he scored his maiden goal in the 4–2 win against Al-Nahda, and followed that up with the winning goal against Al-Orobah on February 2, 2016. His rich goal scoring form continued in March & April 2016 with goals against Damac, Al-Diriyah, in addition to braces against Ohod and Al-Hazem.

==== 2016–17 season ====
During Al-Ettifaq's first season back at the Saudi Professional League, Hazaa played 24 games, starting 9 of them. He played an instrumental role in ensuring the team's safety at the Saudi top tier. On September 16, 2016, he scored the equalizer in the 2–1 win against Al-Hilal and followed that up with goals against Al-Taawoun, Al-Ahli, Al-Ittihad, and Al-Qadsiah. His five goals and one assist in 997 minutes meant that he contributed a goal every 166 minutes.

==== 2017–18 season ====
Hazaa started the season in an explosive form, scoring five goals in as many starts. In his first game, he netted twice in the 2–1 win against Al-Ahli, and followed that up by netting the injury-time equalizer in the 2–2 draw against Al-Nassr. His rich goal scoring vein continued with a brace in the 3–2 loss to Al-Shabab, and his team's solitary goal in the 1–1 draw with Al-Fateh. Hazaa's substantial contribution went beyond his goals, as he assisted both goals in the 2–1 win at Al-Fayha before scoring the first and assisting the second goal in his team's 2–0 win against Al-Raed. His season ended prematurely after suffering an ACL injury on December 23, 2017.

==== Al-Taawoun ====
On January 26, 2022, Al-Hazaa joined Pro League side Al-Taawoun on loan.

==== Al-Tai ====
On 31 August 2022, Al-Hazaa joined Al-Tai on a two-year deal.

=== International career ===
His great form in the 2017–18 season, earned him a first international call-up to Saudi Arabia national team under newly hired coach Edgardo Bauza. On October 7, 2017, he made his international bow in starting the 5–2 friendly win against Jamaica, scoring his maiden goal after 37 minutes and winning the penalty that led to the third goal. Three days later, he started his second game in the 3–0 loss against Ghana.

== Career statistics ==
=== Club ===
As of 26 January 2022

Club	Season	League			Cup (Note: Discontinued in September 19, 2017)		Kings Cup		Total	
Club	Season	Division	Apps	Goals	Apps	Goals	Apps	Goals	Apps	Goals
Al-Ettifaq	2012–13	Pro League	2	0	0	0	0	0	2	0
Al-Ettifaq	2013–14	Pro League	2	0	0	0	0	0	2	0
Al-Ettifaq	2014–15	First Division	7	1	0	0	0	0	7	1
Al-Ettifaq	2015–16	First Division	19	8	0	0	1	0	20	8
Al-Ettifaq	2016–17	Pro League	24	5	1	0	3	1	28	6
Al-Ettifaq	2017–18	Pro League	12	7	0	0	0	0	12	7
Al-Ettifaq	2018–19	Pro League	15	2	—		4	5	19	7
Al-Ettifaq	2019–20	Pro League	23	6	—		4	3	27	9
Al-Ettifaq	2020–21	Pro League	16	3	—		0	0	16	3
Al-Ettifaq	2020–21	Pro League	14	1	—		1	0	15	1
Al-Ettifaq	Club Total		134	33	1	0	13	9	148	42
Al-Khaleej (loan)	2013–14	First Division	4	3	0	0	0	0	4	3
Al-Safa (loan)	2014–15	First Division	11	6	0	0	1	0	12	6
Career Total			149	42	1	0	14	9	164	51

=== International ===
As of 22 December 2017

Appearances and goals by national team and year
National team	Year	Apps	Goals
Saudi Arabia	2017	3	1
Total		3	1

=== International goals ===
As of 10 October 2017
Saudi Arabia score listed first, score column indicates score after each Hazaa goal.

International goals by date, venue, cap, opponent, score, result and competition
No.	Date	Venue	Cap	Opponent	Score	Result	Competition
1	7 October 2017	King Abdullah Sports City, Jeddah, Saudi Arabia	1	Jamaica	2–1	5–2	Friendly

== Honours ==
Al-Ettifaq

- Saudi First Division: 2015-16 (champion, promotion)

Al-Khaleej

- Saudi First Division: 2013-14 (runner-up, promotion)
