= Moayad Hassan =

Qatari footballer (born 1992)

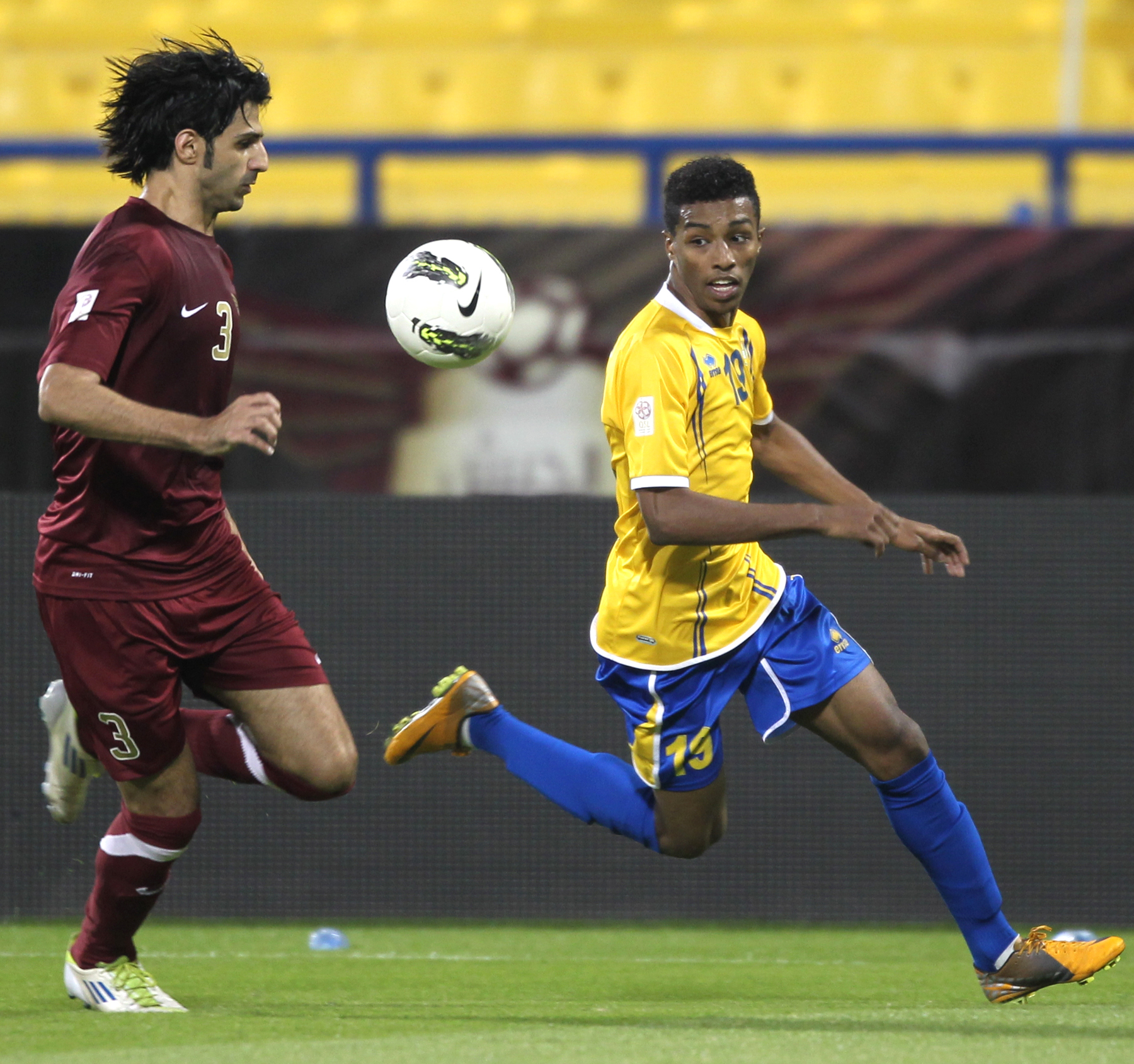
- Hassan (right) in action for Al-Gharafa (2011)

Personal information
- Full name: Moayad Hassan Fedaily
- Date of birth: 28 January 1992 (age 34)
- Place of birth: Qatar
- Height: 1.70 m (5 ft 7 in)
- Position: Winger

Team information
- Current team: Al-Wakrah
- Number: 33

Senior career*
Years	Team	Apps	(Gls)
2011–2023	Al-Gharafa	166	(31)
2023–2024	Al-Markhiya	18	(0)
2024–	Al-Wakrah	8	(0)

International career
2008–	Qatar	8	(1)
- * Club domestic league appearances and goals as of 17 January 2026

Moayad Hassan Fedaily (born 28 January 1992) is a Qatari football player. He currently plays for Al-Wakrah in the Qatar Stars League

== International career ==
=== International goals ===
Scores and results list Qatar's goal tally first.

No	Date	Venue	Opponent	Score	Result	Competition
1.	25 December 2013	Jassim Bin Hamad Stadium, Doha, Qatar	Palestine	1–0	1–0	2014 WAFF Championship
