= Yahya Otain =

Saudi Arabian footballer

Personal information
- Full name: Yahya Mohammed Otain Hakami
- Date of birth: March 9, 1990 (age 36)
- Place of birth: Saudi Arabia
- Height: 1.77 m (5 ft 9 1/2 in)
- Position: Midfielder

Youth career
- –2008: Ras Tanura
- 2008–2011: Al-Ettifaq

Senior career*
Years	Team	Apps	(Gls)
2011–2018	Al-Ettifaq	82	(4)
2012–2013	→ Al-Ahli (loan)	8	(0)
2018–2019	Al-Raed	4	(0)
2019–2020	Al-Nahda		
2020–2022	Al-Khaleej	25	(0)
2022–2023	Al-Nairyah		
- * Club domestic league appearances and goals as of 7 March 2019

Yahya Otain (Arabic: يحيى عتين; born 9 March 1990) is a Saudi professional footballer who plays as a midfielder.

== Honours ==
Al-Ettifaq

- First Division: 2015–16

Al-Khaleej

- First Division: 2021–22
