= Ahmed Abdel-Sattar =

Jordanian footballer

Personal information
- Full name: Ahmed Abdel-Sattar Nawwas
- Date of birth: 6 July 1984 (age 42)
- Place of birth: Amman, Jordan
- Height: 1.88 m (6 ft 2 in)
- Position: Goalkeeper

Youth career
- 2003–2004: University of Jordan

Senior career*
Years	Team	Apps	(Gls)
2002–2012	Shabab Al-Ordon		
2012–2019	Al-Jazeera		
2019-2024	Al-Wehdat		

International career^{‡}
2007–2021	Jordan		
- * Club domestic league appearances and goals ‡ National team caps and goals as of 9 December 2017

Ahmed Abdel-Sattar Nawwas (Arabic: احمد عبد الستار نواس; born 6 July 1984) is a Jordanian former footballer who played as a goalkeeper.

== Honours ==
- Jordan Premier League: 2005–06
- Jordan FA Cup: 2006, 2007
- Jordan FA Shield: 2007
- Jordan Super Cup: 2007
- AFC Cup: 2007
- Best Goalkeeper in Jordan Premier League (2012–2013)
