= Majed Al-Khaibari =

Saudi Arabian footballer

Personal information
- Full name: Majed Abdullah Al-Khaibari
- Date of birth: September 24, 1991 (age 35)
- Place of birth: Jeddah, Saudi Arabia
- Position: Left back

Team information
- Current team: Al-Jandal
- Number: 6

Youth career
- Al-Ahli

Senior career*
Years	Team	Apps	(Gls)
2013–2014	Al-Ahli	3	(0)
2014–2015	Najran	22	(2)
2015–2018	Al-Ittihad	21	(0)
2017–2018	→ Al-Ettifaq (loan)	11	(1)
2018–2019	Al-Shoulla	35	(0)
2019–2020	Al-Qadsiah	25	(2)
2020–2023	Al-Shoulla	90	(1)
2023–	Al-Jandal	0	(0)
- * Club domestic league appearances and goals

Majed Al-Khaibari (Arabic: ماجد الخيبري; born 24 September 1991) is a Saudi Arabian footballer who plays for Al-Jandal as a left back.
