= Fahad Al Hajeri =

Kuwaiti footballer

Personal information
- Full name: Fahad Mofarraj Hassan Al Hajeri
- Date of birth: 10 November 1991 (age 35)
- Place of birth: Kuwait City, Kuwait
- Height: 1.86 m (6 ft 1 in)
- Position: Centre back

Team information
- Current team: Kazma
- Number: 4

Senior career*
Years	Team	Apps	(Gls)
2009–2013	Al-Tadamon	56	(5)
2013–2015	Al-Salmiya	28	(6)
2015–2026	Kuwait SC	140	(22)
2017–2018	→ Al-Ettifaq (loan)	6	(0)
2026–	Kazma	3	(0)

International career
2012–	Kuwait	108	(8)
- * Club domestic league appearances and goals

Fahad Mofarraj Hassan Al Hajeri (Arabic: فهد مفرح حسن الهاجري; born 10 November 1991) is a Kuwaiti professional footballer who plays as a centre back for Kuwait SC and the Kuwait national team.

== Career ==
On 16 October 2012, Al Hajeri made his international debut against the Philippines. He scored his first goal against Lebanon. He was selected in Kuwait's squad for the 2015 AFC Asian Cup.

=== International goals ===
Scores and results list Kuwait's goal tally first.

No.	Date	Venue	Opponent	Score	Result	Competition
1.	29 December 2013	Jassim Bin Hamad Stadium, Doha, Qatar	Lebanon	1–0	2–0	2014 WAFF Championship
2.	1 January 2014	Abdullah bin Khalifa Stadium, Doha, Qatar	Jordan	1–0	1–2	2014 WAFF Championship
3.	14 May 2014	Al Kuwait Sports Club Stadium, Kuwait City, Kuwait	Afghanistan	3–0	3–2	Friendly
4.	10 September 2018	Ali Sabah Al-Salem Stadium, Al Farwaniyah, Kuwait	Iraq	2–2	2–2	Friendly
5.	5 September 2019	Al Kuwait Sports Club Stadium, Kuwait City, Kuwait	Nepal	2–0	7–0	2022 FIFA World Cup qualification
6.	25 May 2021	The Sevens Stadium, Dubai, United Arab Emirates	Malaysia	2–1	4–1	Friendly
7.	2 December 2025	Lusail Stadium, Lusail, Qatar	Egypt	1–0	1–1	2025 FIFA Arab Cup
8.	9 December 2025	Stadium 974, Doha, Qatar	United Arab Emirates	1–2	1–3	2025 FIFA Arab Cup

== Honours ==
Al-Kuwait

- AFC Challenge League: 2025-2026
