= Mahmoud Saad (footballer, born 1983) =

Egyptian footballer

Personal information
- Full name: Mahmoud Abdulhameed Saad
- Date of birth: 12 January 1983 (age 43)
- Place of birth: Egypt
- Position: Winger

Youth career
- Haras El-Hodood

Senior career*
Years	Team	Apps	(Gls)
2004–2007	Haras El-Hodood		
2007–2011	El Jaish		
2011–2022	Al-Kharaitiyat	176	(13)
- * Club domestic league appearances and goals

Mahmoud Saad (Arabic:محمود سعد; born 12 January 1983) is an Egyptian footballer. He plays as a left back.
