= 2015–16 Saudi First Division =

Saudi First Division League
- Season: 2015–16
- Champions: Al-Ettifaq (1st title)
- Promoted: Al-Ettifaq; Al-Batin
- Relegated: Al-Riyadh; Al-Diriyah; Al-Mujazzal
- Matches: 240
- Goals: 584 (2.43 per match)
- Top goalscorer: Abdulfattah Adam (20 goals)
- Biggest home win: Al-Batin 5–0 Al-Riyadh (5 September 2015)
- Biggest away win: Al-Nahda 0–5 Al-Ettifaq (17 September 2015)
- Highest scoring: Al-Mujazzal 4–3 Al-Riyadh (21 August 2015); Al-Jeel 4–3 Al-Diriyah (17 April 2016)
- Longest winning run: 4 matches Al-Mujazzal; Al-Shoulla
- Longest unbeaten run: 15 matches Al-Ettifaq
- Longest winless run: 26 matches Al-Diriyah
- Longest losing run: 10 matches Al-Diriyah

2015–16 Saudi First Division League was the 39th season of the Saudi First Division League since its establishment in 1976. The season started on 21 August 2015 and concluded on 23 April 2016.

On 23 April 2016, Al-Mujazzal won the league title and earned promotion to 2016–17 Pro League along with Al-Ettifaq, while Al-Batin qualified to the promotion play-offs. Al-Nahda, Al-Riyadh and Al-Diriyah were relegated to the 2016–17 Saudi Second Division.

On 21 July 2016, the SAFF announced the relegation of Al-Mujazzal to the Saudi Second Division due to match fixing. On 3 August 2016, they announced that Al-Ettifaq were crowned champions and Al-Batin would be promoted to the 2016–17 Professional League instead of Al-Mujazzal, and they also announced that Al-Mujazzal would be relegated instead of Al-Nahda.

== Teams ==
A total of 16 teams are contesting the league, including 11 sides from the 2014–15 season, two relegated from the 2014–15 Saudi Pro League and three promoted from the 2014–15 Saudi Second Division. Al-Shoulla and Al-Orobah join as the two relegated sides. Damac were promoted as champions, while Al-Nojoom were promoted as Group B winners. Ohod secured the final berth by winning the playoffs.

== Team changes ==
The following teams have changed division since the 2014–15 season.

=== To the First Division ===
Promoted from the Second Division

- Damac
- Al-Nojoom
- Ohod

Relegated from the Pro League

- Al-Shoulla
- Al-Orobah

=== From the First Division ===
Relegated to the Second Division

- Al-Safa
- Abha
- Hetten

Promoted to the Pro League

- Al-Qadsiah
- Al-Wehda

== Stadia and locations ==
Locations of teams in the 2015–16 Saudi First Division

Club	Location	Stadium
Al-Batin	Hafar al-Batin	Al-Batin Club Stadium
Al-Diriyah	Diriyah	Prince Turki bin Abdul Aziz Stadium
Al-Ettifaq	Dammam	Prince Mohamed bin Fahd Stadium
Al-Feiha	Al Majma'ah	Prince Salman Bin Abdulaziz Sport City Stadium
Al-Hazm	Ar Rass	Al Hazm Club Stadium
Al-Jeel	Al-Hasa	Prince Abdullah bin Jalawi Stadium
Al-Mojzel	Al Majma'ah	Prince Salman Bin Abdulaziz Sport City Stadium
Al-Nahda	Dammam	Prince Mohamed bin Fahd Stadium
Al-Nojoom	Al-Hasa	Prince Abdullah bin Jalawi Stadium
Al-Orobah	Sakakah	Al-Oruba Club Stadium
Al-Riyadh	Riyadh	Prince Turki bin Abdul Aziz Stadium
Al-Shoulla	Al Kharj	Al-Shoalah Club Stadium
Al-Tai	Ha'il	Prince Abdul Aziz bin Musa'ed Stadium
Al-Watani	Tabuk	King Khalid Sport City Stadium
Damac	Khamis Mushait	Prince Sultan bin Abdul Aziz Stadium
Ohod	Medina	Prince Mohammed bin Abdul Aziz Stadium

== League table ==
Pos	Team	Pld	W	D	L	GF	GA	GD	Pts	Promotion, qualification or relegation
1	Al-Ettifaq (C, P)	30	14	12	4	46	21	+25	54	Promotion to Professional League
2	Al-Batin (P)	30	15	8	7	49	31	+18	53	Promotion to Professional League
3	Al-Orobah	30	15	6	9	49	32	+17	51	
4	Damac	30	12	9	9	36	34	+2	45	
5	Al-Jeel	30	11	11	8	43	41	+2	44	
6	Al-Shoulla	30	11	10	9	33	33	0	43	
7	Al-Tai	30	12	6	12	38	36	+2	42	
8	Al-Feiha	30	9	10	11	33	41	−8	37 (Note: Al-Feiha ahead on head-to-head record; Ohod–Al-Feiha 2–2, Al-Feiha–Ohod 1–0.)	
9	Ohod	30	8	13	9	29	33	−4	37	
10	Al-Watani	30	7	15	8	29	29	0	36	
11	Al-Nojoom	30	8	11	11	34	37	−3	35	
12	Al-Hazm	30	8	9	13	32	42	−10	33	
13	Al-Nahda	30	8	9	13	32	45	−13	33	
14	Al-Riyadh (R)	30	6	11	13	33	41	−8	29	Relegation to Second Division
15	Al-Diriyah (R)	30	2	8	20	22	56	−34	14	Relegation to Second Division
16	Al-Mojzel (Note: Al-Mojzel were originally the first-placed team, but were placed at the bottom of the league table due to match-fixing scandals on 21 July 2016.) (R)	30	14	12	4	46	32	+14	54	Relegation to Second Division

Source: goalzz.com
Rules for classification: 1) Points; 2) Head-to-Head points; 3) Head-to-Head goal difference; 4) Total goal difference; 5) Total goals scored; 6) Play-off (only for deciding champion, promotion and relegation).
(C) Champions; (P) Promoted; (R) Relegated

== Results ==
Home \ Away	BAT	DIR	ETT	FEI	HAZ	JEL	MOJ	NAH	NOJ	ORO	RIY	SHO	TAI	WAT	DAM	OHD
Al-Batin		3–1	1–1	1–0	3–1	2–3	1–0	3–2	0–0	2–1	5–0	2–0	2–2	2–1	0–0	0–1
Al-Diriyah	0–4		0–3	0–1	1–1	0–2	2–2	0–1	0–2	1–2	2–1	0–1	1–4	0–0	1–1	1–1
Al-Ettifaq	1–1	3–1		1–1	3–0	0–0	0–0	4–2	1–0	0–1	1–1	1–1	2–1	1–1	3–0	0–1
Al-Feiha	1–3	1–0	1–1		2–1	0–0	0–0	1–2	3–1	2–4	4–2	1–1	1–0	1–0	1–2	1–0
Al-Hazem	0–0	1–0	2–2	1–2		1–1	1–3	1–1	2–2	0–2	2–2	2–0	0–1	1–0	0–1	1–0
Al-Jeel	2–2	4–3	0–2	1–1	1–0		2–2	2–1	3–1	3–2	1–0	0–2	5–1	2–2	0–2	0–0
Al-Mojzel	0–2	2–2	2–0	2–1	1–1	3–2		2–1	3–2	1–2	4–3	0–0	2–1	2–1	1–0	2–2
Al-Nahda	2–1	1–1	0–5	1–1	1–2	1–1	0–3		1–1	2–1	2–1	2–0	0–2	1–1	0–1	1–2
Al-Nojoom	0–0	4–1	0–0	1–0	2–0	1–1	1–1	2–2		1–0	2–1	2–0	0–3	0–1	2–0	2–4
Al-Orobah	3–1	2–0	0–1	4–1	4–1	2–0	2–2	1–0	2–1		1–1	1–1	1–2	1–2	0–1	2–0
Al-Riyadh	3–1	2–1	0–0	1–1	0–2	0–1	0–1	3–0	1–1	0–0		2–3	3–0	1–1	1–1	1–1
Al-Shoulla	1–0	1–1	1–4	2–0	3–2	2–1	0–0	0–1	2–0	2–4	1–0		0–1	1–1	1–2	2–0
Al-Tai	1–2	1–0	2–0	3–0	2–4	1–2	0–1	0–0	2–1	1–1	0–1	1–3		1–1	0–1	2–0
Al-Watani	2–1	0–1	1–2	0–0	1–0	4–2	0–2	0–0	1–1	0–1	0–0	1–1	0–0		1–0	2–2
Damac	1–2	3–0	0–2	4–2	1–1	0–0	2–1	2–4	2–1	2–1	1–2	1–1	1–2	2–2		1–1
Ohod	1–2	2–1	0–2	2–2	0–1	3–1	1–1	1–0	0–0	1–1	1–0	0–0	1–1	0–2	1–1	

Updated to match(es) played on 23 April 2016. Source: Goalzz.com
Legend: Blue = home team win; Yellow = draw; Red = away team win.

== Statistics ==
=== Scoring ===
==== Top scorers ====
As of 23 April 2016

Rank	Player	Club	Goals
1	(Niger) Abdulfattah Adam	Al-Jeel	20
2	(Benin) Abdel Fadel Suanon	Damac	17
3	(Brazil) Leo	Al-Mojzel	15
4	(Saudi Arabia) Mashari Al-Enezi	Al-Orobah	13
5	(Saudi Arabia) Mohammed Al-Menqash	Al-Mojzel	12
6	(Saudi Arabia) Sahow Metlaq	Al-Batin	11
7	(Brazil) Douglas	Al-Jeel	10
7	(Saudi Arabia) Mohammed Al-Hussainan	Al-Riyadh	10
9	(Chad) Maher Sharoma	Al-Nojoom	9

==== Hat-tricks ====
Player	For	Against	Result	Date	Ref.
(Saudi Arabia) Marei Al-Moqaadi	Al-Hazm	Al-Tai	4–2 (A)	28 August 2015	
(Brazil) Leo	Al-Mojzel	Al-Nojoom	3–2 (H)	17 October 2015	
(Saudi Arabia) Mohammed Al-Kuwaykibi	Al-Orobah	Al-Feiha	4–1 (H)	27 November 2015	
(Saudi Arabia) Mohammed Al-Khamis	Al-Feiha	Al-Nojoom	3–1 (H)	18 December 2015	
(Niger) Abdulfattah Adam	Al-Jeel	Al-Batin	3–2 (A)	1 January 2016	
(Nigeria) Peter Kolawole	Al-Watani	Al-Jeel	4–2 (H)	29 January 2016	
(Niger) Abdulfattah Adam	Al-Jeel	Al-Tai	5–1 (H)	6 February 2016	
(Benin) Abdel Fadel Suanon	Damac	Al-Diriyah	3–0 (H)	6 February 2016	
(Brazil) David da Silva	Al-Orobah	Al-Feiha	4–2 (A)	2 April 2016	

=== Clean sheets ===
As of 23 April 2016

Rank	Player	Club	Clean sheets
1	(Saudi Arabia) Ahmed Al-Kassar	Al-Ettifaq	11
2	(Saudi Arabia) Mazyad Freeh	Al-Batin	10
3	(Saudi Arabia) Emad Al-Dossari	Al-Tai	9
3	(Saudi Arabia) Saeed Al-Harbi	Al-Shoulla	9
3	(Saudi Arabia) Nawaf Al-Otaibi	Al-Mojzel	9
6	(Saudi Arabia) Abdulmunem Al-Wabari	Al-Jeel	8
7	(Saudi Arabia) Abdoh Besisi	Ohod	7
8	(Saudi Arabia) Abdulrahman Dagriri	Damac	6
8	(Saudi Arabia) Osama Al-Hamdan	Al-Feiha/Al-Nahda	6
8	(Saudi Arabia) Sultan Al-Balawi	Al-Watani	6
