= Salman Hazazi =

Saudi Arabian footballer

Personal information
- Full name: Salman Hazazi
- Date of birth: 1 January 1992 (age 34)
- Place of birth: Saudi Arabia
- Height: 1.70 m (5 ft 7 in)
- Position: Right back

Youth career
- Al-Qadisiyah

Senior career*
Years	Team	Apps	(Gls)
2011–2014	Al-Qadisiyah		
2014–2015	Al-Raed	6	(0)
2015–2016	Al-Khaleej	23	(0)
2016–2017	Al-Ettifaq	1	(0)
2017–2018	Al-Khaleej		
2018–2019	Al-Jabalain	28	(0)
2020–2022	Al-Noor		
- * Club domestic league appearances and goals

Salman Hazazi (Arabic: سلمان هزازي; born 1 January 1992) is a Saudi Arabian footballer who plays as a right back.
