= Raed Al-Amri =

Saudi Arabian footballer

Personal information
- Full name: Raed Amer Al-Amri
- Date of birth: June 27, 1989 (age 37)
- Place of birth: Saudi Arabia
- Position: Left-back

Youth career
- Al-Ittihad

Senior career*
Years	Team	Apps	(Gls)
2010–2012	Al-Watani		
2012	Al-Raed	1	(0)
2012–2014	Al-Kawkab		
2014–2015	Al-Tai		
2015–2016	Najran	10	(1)
2017–2020	Al-Tai	38	(0)
2020–2021	Al-Shoalah	19	(0)
2021–2022	Al-Sahel	19	(0)
- * Club domestic league appearances and goals as of 17 May 2019

Raed Al-Amri (Arabic: رائد العمري; born June 27, 1989), is a Saudi Arabian professional footballer who plays as a left-back.
