= Emad Al-Dossari (footballer, born 1985) =

Saudi Arabian footballer

Imad Al-Dossari
Personal information
- Full name: Imad Abdullah Al-Dossari
- Date of birth: June 4, 1985 (age 41)
- Place of birth: Saudi Arabia
- Height: 1.82 m (5 ft 11 1/2 in)
- Position: Goalkeeper

Team information
- Current team: Tabarjal

Senior career*
Years	Team	Apps	(Gls)
2006–2008	Al-Feiha		
2008–2013	Al-Taawon	3	(0)
2013–2016	Al-Ta'ee		
2016–2017	Al Wehda		
2017	→ Al-Ta'ee (loan)		
2017–2018	Al-Washm		
2018–2019	Al-Lewaa		
2019–2020	Al-Akhdoud		
2020–2021	Al-Najma		
2021–	Tabarjal		
- * Club domestic league appearances and goals

Imad Al-Dossari (born 4 June 1985) is a Saudi football player. He currently plays for Tabarjal as a goalkeeper.
