= Omar Al-Sonain =

Saudi Arabian footballer

Omar Abdulaziz Al-Sonain
Personal information
- Full name: Omar Abdulaziz Al-Sonain
- Date of birth: March 14, 1995 (age 31)
- Height: 1.67 m (5 ft 5 1/2 in)
- Position: Right-back

Youth career
- Al-Ettifaq

Senior career*
| Years | Team | Apps | (Gls) |
| 2015–2020 | Al-Ettifaq | 61 | (1) |
| 2020–2021 | Al-Kawkab | 3 | (0) |
| 2021–2022 | Al-Sahel | 25 | (0) |

International career
| 2017 | Saudi Arabia U23 | | |
- * Club domestic league appearances and goals as of 18:50, 15 March 2019 (UTC)

Omar Abdulaziz Al-Sonain (Arabic: عمر عبد العزيز السنين; born 14 March 1995) is a Saudi professional footballer who plays as a right back.
