= Abdulaziz Waseli =

Saudi Arabian footballer

Personal information
- Full name: Abdulaziz Ali Waseli
- Date of birth: April 23, 1996 (age 30)
- Place of birth: Saudi Arabia
- Height: 1.69 m (5 ft 6 1/2 in)
- Position: Defender

Youth career
- Al-Ettifaq

Senior career*
Years	Team	Apps	(Gls)
2017–2018	Al-Ettifaq	2	(0)
2018	Al-Nojoom		
2018–2019	Al-Sahel		
2021	Mudhar		
- * Club domestic league appearances and goals

Abdulaziz Waseli [عبدالعزيز واصلى in Arabic] (born 23 April 1996) is a Saudi football player who plays as a defender.
