= Adel Ahmed =

Qatari Striker playing for Al Bidda

Personal information
- Full name: Adel Ahmad Mohammad
- Date of birth: 10 November 1990 (age 36)
- Place of birth: Qatar
- Height: 1.83 m (6 ft 0 in)
- Position: Striker

Youth career
- Al-Sadd

Senior career*
| Years | Team | Apps | (Gls) |
| 2009–2012 | Al Ahli | 41 | (6) |
| 2012–2015 | Lekhwiya | 25 | (5) |
| 2014–2015 | → Al Wakrah (loan) | 13 | (1) |
| 2015–2018 | Al-Gharafa SC | 38 | (1) |
| 2018–2019 | Al-Khor | 9 | (0) |
| 2019–2020 | Al Bidda | 15 | (10) |
| 2020–2021 | Al-Shamal | 21 | (1) |
| 2021–2024 | Al Bidda | | |
| 2025 | Al-Markhiya | | |

International career^{‡}
| 2010 | Qatar U23 | 2 | (0) |
| 2013– | Qatar | 5 | (1) |
- * Club domestic league appearances and goals as of 17:37, 15 April 2023 (UTC) ‡ National team caps and goals as of 17:37, 12 March 2014 (UTC)

Adel Ahmad (born 10 November 1990) is a Qatari footballer who plays as a striker.
