= Marei Al-Moqaadi =

Saudi Arabian footballer

Personal information
- Full name: Marei Marzoq Al-Moqaadi
- Date of birth: July 12, 1988 (age 38)
- Place of birth: Saudi Arabia
- Height: 1.81 m (5 ft 11 1/2 in)
- Position: Striker

Senior career*
| Years | Team | Apps | (Gls) |
| 2010–2011 | Al-Watani | | |
| 2011–2013 | Al-Suqoor | | |
| 2013–2016 | Al-Hazem | 57 | (21) |
| 2016–2018 | Al-Ettifaq | 14 | (1) |
| 2017 | → Al-Hazem (loan) | 11 | (2) |
| 2018–2020 | Al-Kholood | | |
| 2021–2022 | Al-Hejaz | | |
| 2022–2023 | Muhayil | | |
- * Club domestic league appearances and goals

Marei Al-Moqaadi (Arabic: مرعي المقعدي, born 12 July 1988) is a Saudi football player who plays as a striker.
