= Nasser Al-Abdeli =

Saudi Arabian footballer

Personal information
- Full name: Nasser Zaher Al-Abdeli
- Date of birth: September 29, 1993 (age 33)
- Place of birth: Saudi Arabia
- Height: 1.76 m (5 ft 9 in)
- Position: Winger

Team information
- Current team: Wej

Youth career
- 2010–2013: Al-Ahli
- 2013–2015: Al-Ittihad

Senior career*
Years	Team	Apps	(Gls)
2015–2016	Al-Nojoom		
2016–2017	Al-Ettifaq	3	(0)
2018	Al-Nahda		
2020	Al-Qadsiah	4	(0)
2020–2021	Al-Khaleej	23	(2)
2021–2023	Al-Adalah	35	(1)
2023	Al-Arabi	8	(0)
2023–2024	Al-Jabalain	13	(0)
2024–2025	Al-Entesar		
2025–2026	Afif		
2026–	Wej		
- * Club domestic league appearances and goals

Nasser Al-Abdeli (Arabic: ناصر العبدلي; born September 29, 1993) is a Saudi footballer who plays for Wej as a winger.

== Career ==
On 20 January 2023, Al-Abdeli joined Al-Arabi.

On 31 July 2023, Al-Abdeli joined Al-Jabalain.

On 3 September 2025, Al-Abdeli joined Afif.
