= Abdullah Al-Saleh =

Saudi Arabian footballer

Personal information
- Full name: Abdullah Al-Saleh
- Date of birth: January 15, 1988 (age 38)
- Place of birth: Al-Hasa, Saudi Arabia
- Height: 1.85 m (6 ft 1 in)
- Position: Goalkeeper

Youth career
- Al-Adalah

Senior career*
Years	Team	Apps	(Gls)
2009–2011	Al-Adalah		
2011–2022	Al-Ettifaq	65	(0)
2023–2026	Al-Zulfi		
- * Club domestic league appearances and goals as of 31 May 2023

Abdullah Al-Saleh (Arabic: عبد الله الصالح; born 15 January 1988) is a Saudi professional footballer who plays as a goalkeeper.

== Career ==
On 20 August 2023, Al-Saleh joined Al-Zulfi after a year without a club.
