= Aiedh Al-Sohaimi =

Saudi Arabian footballer

Personal information
- Full name: Aiedh Jaber Saleh Al-Sohaimi
- Date of birth: December 20, 1986 (age 39)
- Place of birth: Saudi Arabia
- Height: 1.72 m (5 ft 7 1/2 in)
- Position: Attacking midfielder

Youth career
- Al-Qadisiyah

Senior career*
Years	Team	Apps	(Gls)
2008–2013	Al-Qadisiyah		
2013–2017	Al-Ettifaq	18	(2)
2016–2017	→ Al-Nahda (loan)		
2017–2019	Al-Nahda		
2019–2020	Al-Thoqbah		
2020–2021	Al-Taraji		
2021–2023	Al-Thoqbah		
- * Club domestic league appearances and goals

Aiedh Al-Sohaimi (Arabic:عايض السهيمي) is a football player, who plays as an attacking midfielder.
