= Leo (footballer, born November 1989) =

Brazilian footballer

Personal information
- Full name: Leonardo Passos Alves
- Date of birth: November 29, 1989 (age 36)
- Place of birth: Jacobina, Brazil
- Height: 1.82 m (5 ft 11 1/2 in)
- Position: Striker

Senior career*
Years	Team	Apps	(Gls)
2010–2011	Criciúma		
2012	Beitar Jerusalem	12	(3)
2012	Hapoel Acre	10	(1)
2013	Grêmio Barueri	10	(0)
2013–2014	Metalurh Zaporizhya	14	(1)
2014–2015	Hakoah Amidar Ramat Gan F.C	5	(0)
2015–2016	Al-Mujazzel		
2016–2017	Al-Ettifaq		
2017	→ Al-Ta'ee (loan)		
2017–2018	Al-Rifaa		
2018	Al-Arabi SC		
2018–2019	Al-Adalah		
2019–2020	Al-Safa		
2020	Kuching City		
- * Club domestic league appearances and goals as of 3 March 2015

Leonardo Passos Alves (born November 29, 1989, in Jacobina, Brazil), known as Leo, is a Brazilian footballer, who plays for Kuching City In Malaysia. Leo plays mainly as a striker.

== Career ==
In August 2013 he signed a contract with FC Metalurh Zaporizhya. In January 2020, he signed a contract with Kuching FA He is playing at Kuching city since January 2020. Leonardo Alves has been played in a lot of teams around the world. He was part of Chicago and Portugal team.
