= Jamaan Al-Dossari (footballer, born 1987) =

Saudi Arabian footballer

Personal information
- Full name: Jamaan Ibrahim Al-Dossari
- Date of birth: 19 June 1987 (age 39)
- Place of birth: Riyadh, Saudi Arabia
- Height: 1.73 m (5 ft 8 in)
- Position: Centre back

Team information
- Current team: Al-Selmiyah

Senior career*
Years	Team	Apps	(Gls)
2007–2012	Al-Riyadh		
2012–2016	Al-Nassr		
2016–2017	Al-Ettifaq		
2017–2018	Al-Shabab		
2019–2020	Al-Shoalah		
2022–2023	Al-Waseel		
2023–2024	Al-Mehmal		
2024–2025	Al-Motawaa		
2025–	Al-Selmiyah		
- * Club domestic league appearances and goals as of 11, 14 June 2015 (UTC)

Jamaan Al-Dossari (Arabic: جمعان الدوسري; born 19 June 1987, in Riyadh) is a Saudi football player who currently plays for Al-Selmiyah as a defender. He joined the club in 2014 from Al-Riyadh.
