= Osama Al-Hamdan =

Algerian footballer (born 1988)

Personal information
- Full name: Osama Zaid Al-Hamdan
- Date of birth: November 1, 1988 (age 37)
- Place of birth: Algeria
- Height: 1.85 m (6 ft 1 in)
- Position: Goalkeeper

Youth career
- Al-Ittihad

Senior career*
Years	Team	Apps	(Gls)
2007–2011	Al-Watani		
2011–2012	Al-Diriyah		
2011	→ Al-Orobah (loan)		
2012–2013	Al Jabalain		
2013–2016	Al-Feiha		
2016	Al-Nahda		
2016–2017	Al-Ettifaq		
2017–2018	Al-Nahda		
2018–2019	Al-Diriyah		
2019	Al-Mujazzal		
2019–2020	Al-Jubail		
- * Club domestic league appearances and goals

Osama Al-Hamdan (Arabic:أسامه الحمدان; born 1 November 1988) is a football (soccer) player who currently plays as a goalkeeper.
