= Ramón (given name) =

Ramón is a Spanish given name. Notable people with this name include:

== Nickname ==
- Ramón (footballer, born 1950), Brazilian footballer
- Ramón (footballer, born 1983), Brazilian footballer
- Ramón (footballer, born 1988), Brazilian footballer
- Ramón (footballer, born 1990), Brazilian footballer
- Ramon (footballer, born 1995), Brazilian footballer
- Ramon (footballer, born 1997), Brazilian footballer
- Ramon (footballer, born 1998), Brazilian footballer
- Ramon (footballer, born 2001), Brazilian footballer

== A ==
- Ramón Ábila (born 1989), Argentine professional footballer
- Ramón Acín (1888–1936), Spanish anarcho-syndicalist, teacher, painter, sculptor, writer and avant-garde artist
- Ramón Alfonseda (born 1948), Spanish footballer
- Ramón Andresen (born 1998), Norwegian singer
- Ramón Arias (born 1992), Uruguayan footballer
- Ramón Arroyo, several people
- Ramón Ayala (born 1945), Mexican accordion player, composer, and songwriter

== B ==
- Ramón Báez, several people
- Ramón Bayés (1930–2025), Spanish psychologist
- Ramón Emeterio Betances (1827–1898), Puerto Rican nationalist
- Ramón Blanco, several people
- Ramón Blázquez (born 1989), Spanish footballer
- Ramón Bragaña (1909–1985), Cuban professional baseball catcher, outfielder, third baseman, and pitcher
- Ramón Bravo (1925–1998), Mexican diver, photographer and underwater filmmaker

== C ==
- Ramón Calderé (born 1959), Spanish professional footballer
- Ramón Castillo (1873–1944), Argentinian president
- Ramón Castro, several people
- Ramón Corral (1854–1912), Mexican politician

== D ==
- Ramón del Castillo Palop, aka Ramón (Spanish singer), Spanish singer who represented Spain in the 2004 Eurovision Song Contest
- Ramon Dekkers, Dutch Muay Thai fighter
- Ramón del Valle-Inclán (1866–1936), Spanish dramatist and novelist
- Ramón Díaz, Argentine football player and coach
- Ramon Dino (born 1995), Professional Brazilian bodybuilder
- Ramón H. Dovalina (born 1943), American educator

== E ==
- Ramón Eguiazábal (1896–1939), Spanish footballer
- Ramón Encinas (1893–1967), Spanish footballer and manager
- Ramón Enríquez (born 2001), Spanish footballer
- Ramón Estévez (born 1940), American actor, using the stage name Martin Sheen
  - Ramon Estevez (born 1963), American actor and son of the above

== F ==
- Ramón Arellano Félix (1964–2002), Mexican drug lord and fugitive
- Ramón Fernandez, several people
- Ramón Flores, several people
- Ramón Frade (1875–1954), Puerto Rican visual artist and architect
- Ramón Fumadó (born 1981), Venezuelan diver

== G ==
- Ramón García, several people
- Ramón González, several people
- Ramón Gómez de la Serna (1888–1963), Spanish author and dramatist
- Ramon Goose (born 1977), British blues-rock guitarist, singer and producer
- Ramón Grosso (1943–2002), Spanish footballer and manager

== H ==
- Ramón Heredia (born 1951), Argentine footballer
- Ramón Heredia (baseball) (1913–?), Cuban professional baseball third baseman, first baseman, and second baseman
- Ramón Hernández (born 1976), Venezuelan baseball player for the Cincinnati Reds
- Ramón Hoyos (1932–2014), Colombian road bicycle racer

== I ==
- Ramón Ibarra Banda (born 1956), Mexican professional wrestler
- Ramón Ibarra Rivera (born 1981), Mexican professional wrestler

== J ==
- Ramón Jiménez Gaona (born 1969), Paraguayan discus thrower
- Ramón Juan (born 1999), Spanish footballer
- Ramón Julián (born 1981), Spanish climber

== L ==
- Ramón Lamoneda (1892–1971), Spanish typographer and politician
- Ramón Laureano (born 1994), Dominican Republic professional baseball player
- Ramón Llorens (1906–1985), Spanish professional football player and coach
- Ramon Lopes de Freitas (born 1989), Brazilian footballer
- Ramón López, several people
- Ramón Luis Ayala Rodríguez, Puerto Rican singer-songwriter

== M ==
- Ramon Machado (born 1991), Brazilian footballer
- Ramón Magsaysay (1907–1957), third president of the Third Philippine Republic
- Ramón Mateo (born 1958), Dominican chess grandmaster
- Ramón Maradiaga (born 1954), Honduran footballer and manager
- Ramón Marín (1832–1902), Puerto Rican educator, journalist, politician, historian, poet, and playwright
- Ramón Marsal (1934–2007), Spanish footballer
- Ramón Medina Bello (born 1966), Argentine professional footballer
- Ramón Menéndez (born 1950), Cuban-American film director and screenwriter
- Ramón Menéndez Pidal (1869–1968), Spanish philologist and historian
- Ramon Menezes (born 1972), Brazilian footballer
- Ramón Mercader (1913–1978), Spanish Communist, assassinated Leon Trotsky
- Ramón Miérez (born 1997), Argentine professional footballer
- Ramón Moya (born 1956), Spanish footballer

== N ==
- Ramon Nomar (born 1974), Venezuelan-born Spanish porn actor
- Ramón Novarro (1899–1968), Mexican actor who achieved fame as a "Latin lover" in silent films
- Ramón Osni Moreira Lage (born 1988), Brazilian footballer

== O ==
- Ramón Olave

== P ==
- Ramón Palomares (1935–2016), Venezuelan poet
- Ramón Polo (1901–1966), Spanish footballer
- Ramon Puerta (born 1951), Argentinian politician

== R ==
- Ramón Ramírez, several people
- Ramón da Silva Ramos (born 1950), Brazilian footballer
- Ramon Reyes (born 1966), American lawyer
- Ramón Reyes (basketball) (1907–1957), Panamanian athlete
- Ramón Luis Rivera Jr. (born 1956), Puerto Rican politician
- Ramón Rivero (1909–1956), Puerto Rican comedian, actor, and composer
- Ramón Rodrigo de Freitas (born 1983), Brazilian footballer
- Ramón Rodríguez, several people
- Ramón Rodríguez, several people
- Ramón Rosso (born 1996), Dominican Republic professional baseball player

== S ==
- Ramón Sáez (1940–2013), Spanish road cyclist
- Ramón Sánchez, several people
- Ramón Sender, several people
- Ramon Sessions, American professional basketball player
- Ramón Soria (born 1989), Spanish footballer

== T ==
- Ramon Tikaram (born 1967), British actor
- Ramon Tremosa (born 1965), Spanish politician
- Ramón Troncoso (born 1983), Dominican baseball pitcher
- Ramon Tulfo (born 1946), Filipino TV host, radio broadcaster, and columnist

== V ==
- Ramón Valdés (1924–1988), Mexican actor and comedian
- Ramón José Velásquez (1916–2014), Venezuelan politician, historian, journalist, and lawyer
- Ramón Alberto Villaverde (1930–1986), Uruguayan footballer
- Ramón Villeda Morales (1909–1971), President of Honduras from 1957 to 1963
- Ramón Vinay (1911–1996), Chilean opera singer
- Ramon Vinicius (born 2000), Brazilian footballer
- Ramón Volcán (born 1956), Venezuelan swimmer

== W ==
- Ramon Wilson (1934–2018), English World Cup-winning footballer

== Z ==
- Ramón Zabalo (1910–1967), British-born Spanish footballer

== Fictional characters ==
- Ramón, a character from the King of Fighters series
- Don Ramón, from the television sitcom El Chavo del Ocho
- General Ramon Esperanza, from the action-thriller Die Hard 2
- Ramón "Sheen" Estevez, a character from The Adventures of Jimmy Neutron, Boy Genius
- Ramόn "Phantom Phreak" Sánchez, from the 1995 movie Hackers
- Ramon Montenegro, a character from the Philippine action drama series FPJ's Batang Quiapo

== See also ==
- Ramón (surname)
