= 2018–19 Ettifaq FC season =

Al-Ettifaq
2018–19 season
- President: Khalid Al Dabal
- Manager: Leonardo Ramos (until 27 November); Sergio Piernas (from 1 December until 19 April); Hélder (from 19 April)
- Stadium: Prince Mohamed bin Fahd Stadium
- SPL: 11th
- King Cup: Quarter-finals (knocked out by Al-Hilal)
- Top goalscorer: League: Cristian Guanca (14); All: Cristian Guanca (17)
- Highest home attendance: 12,817 vs Al-Ittihad (29 December 2019)
- Lowest home attendance: 1,273 vs Al-Taawoun (24 November 2018)
- Average home league attendance: 4,911
Home colours	Away colours	Third colours
- All statistics correct as of 16 May 2019.

The 2018–19 season was Al-Ettifaq's 74th season in existence and their third consecutive season in the Pro League. Along with the Pro League, the club competed in the King Cup.

The season covers the period from 1 July 2018 to 30 June 2019.

== Players ==
=== Squad information ===
As of 27 September 2018

Note: Flags indicate national team as defined under FIFA eligibility rules; some limited exceptions apply. Players may hold more than one non-FIFA nationality.

No.	Pos.	Nation	Player
6	MF	KSA	Hamed Al-Ghamdi
7	MF	KSA	Mohammed Al-Kwikbi
9	FW	KSA	Hazaa Al-Hazaa
10	MF	KSA	Hassan Al-Habib
11	MF	KSA	Ali Hazazi
12	DF	KSA	Hussain Qassem
14	MF	SVK	Filip Kiss
17	DF	KSA	Abdullah Al-Hafith (on loan from Al-Hilal)
19	MF	ARG	Cristian Guanca (on loan from Colón)
21	DF	URU	Ramon Arias
23	MF	URU	Brahian Alemán
24	MF	KSA	Abdurahman Al-Aboud
25	DF	KSA	Saeed Al-Robeai
29	MF	KSA	Mohammad Al-Subaie
30	GK	KSA	Abdullah Al-Saleh

No.	Pos.	Nation	Player
33	DF	EGY	Hussein El Sayed (on loan from Al Ahly)
34	DF	KSA	Ali Al-Khaibari
35	GK	KSA	Mohammed Al-Haiti
40	MF	KSA	Ibrahim Mahnashi
47	MF	KSA	Ahmed Al-Dohaim
50	DF	KSA	Saad Al-Khairi
66	MF	KSA	Abdulaziz Al-Dawsari
70	DF	KSA	Omar Al-Sonain
72	DF	KSA	Khalifah Masrahi
77	DF	KSA	Ahmed Al-Habib
88	MF	KSA	Saad Al-Selouli
90	FW	TUN	Ahmed Akaïchi
92	GK	ALG	Raïs M'Bolhi
99	FW	TUN	Fakhreddine Ben Youssef

==== Out on loan ====
Note: Flags indicate national team as defined under FIFA eligibility rules; some limited exceptions apply. Players may hold more than one non-FIFA nationality.

No.	Pos.	Nation	Player
4	DF	KSA	Faisel Abu Bakr (at Al-Jeel until 30 June 2019)
8	MF	KSA	Osama Al-Khalaf (at Al-Hazem until 30 June 2019)
13	DF	KSA	Osama Al-Saleem (at Al-Kawkab until 30 June 2019)
17	FW	KSA	Nawaf Bouamer (at Al-Khaleej until 30 June 2019)
18	MF	KSA	Fawaz Al-Torais (at Al-Khaleej until 30 June 2019)

No.	Pos.	Nation	Player
20	MF	KSA	Abdulaziz Majrashi (at Al-Batin until 30 June 2019)
22	GK	KSA	Abdullah Al Bahri (at Abha until 30 June 2019)
—	MF	KSA	Hassan Gazwani (at Al-Nahda until 30 June 2019)
—	FW	KSA	Mohammed Al-Saiari (at Al-Hazem until 30 June 2019)

== Transfers ==
=== In ===
==== Summer ====
No.	Pos	Player	Transferred From	Fee	Date	Source
21	CB	(Uruguay) Ramón Arias	(Uruguay) Peñarol	€250,000	19 July 2018	
23	AM	(Uruguay) Brahian Alemán	(Argentina) Gimnasia La Plata	€1,300,000	25 July 2018	
12	LB	(Saudi Arabia) Hussain Qassem	(Saudi Arabia) Al-Hilal	Free	31 July 2018	
25	CB	(Saudi Arabia) Saeed Al-Robeai	(Saudi Arabia) Al-Ahli	Swap	31 July 2018	
80	LM	(Brazil) Farley	(Greece) Panetolikos	Free	9 August 2018	

==== Winter ====
No.	Pos	Player	Transferred From	Fee	Date	Source
90	ST	(Tunisia) Ahmed Akaïchi	(Tunisia) Étoile du Sahel	Free	5 January 2019	
	CB	(Saudi Arabia) Ahmed Al Muhaimeed	(Saudi Arabia) Al-Taraji	Undisclosed	4 February 2019	
	RB	(Saudi Arabia) Saleh Al-Qumaizi	(Saudi Arabia) Al-Shabab	Free	19 February 2019	

=== Loan in ===
==== Summer ====
No.	Pos	Player	Loaned From	Start	End	Source
19	LM	(Argentina) Cristian Guanca	(Argentina) Colón	16 June 2018	30 June 2019	

==== Winter ====
No.	Pos	Player	Loaned From	Start	End	Source
17	CB	(Saudi Arabia) Abdullah Al-Hafith	(Saudi Arabia) Al-Hilal	1 February 2019	30 June 2019	

=== Out ===
==== Summer ====
No.	Pos	Player	Transferred To	Fee	Date	Source
28	GK	(Saudi Arabia) Ahmed Al-Kassar	(Saudi Arabia) Al-Faisaly	Free	29 May 2018	
23	LM	(Norway) Liban Abdi	Free Agent	Released	28 June 2018	
36	CM	(Saudi Arabia) Khaled Al-Hamdhi	(Saudi Arabia) Al-Khaleej	Free	28 June 2018	
16	ST	(Saudi Arabia) Yousef Al-Salem	Free Agent	Released	4 July 2018	
20	ST	(Saudi Arabia) Jaber Al-Ziyadi	(Saudi Arabia) Al-Nojoom	Free	12 July 2018	
6	DM	(Saudi Arabia) Yahya Otain	(Saudi Arabia) Al-Raed	Free	18 July 2018	
4	CB	(Iraq) Ahmad Ibrahim	(Qatar) Al-Arabi	Free	19 July 2018	
19	ST	(Saudi Arabia) Marei Al-Moqaadi	(Saudi Arabia) Al-Ansar	Free	21 July 2018	
3	LB	(Saudi Arabia) Abdulelah Bokhari	(Saudi Arabia) Al-Kawkab	Free	23 July 2018	
12	LB	(Saudi Arabia) Mohammed Al-Zubaidi	(Saudi Arabia) Al-Ahli	Swap	31 July 2018	
12	RB	(Saudi Arabia) Ayman Masrahi	Free Agent	Released	13 August 2018	
14	CM	(Saudi Arabia) Lutfi Al-Rashidi	Free Agent	Released	13 August 2018	

==== Winter ====
No.	Pos	Player	Transferred To	Fee	Date	Source
80	LM	(Brazil) Farley Rosa	Free Agent	Released	15 January 2019	

=== Loan out ===
==== Summer ====
No.	Pos	Player	Loaned To	Start	End	Source
18	RM	(Saudi Arabia) Fawaz Al-Torais	(Saudi Arabia) Al-Khaleej	2 June 2018	30 June 2019	
	AM	(Saudi Arabia) Hassan Gazwani	(Saudi Arabia) Al-Nahda	3 June 2018	30 June 2019	
70	ST	(Saudi Arabia) Mohammed Al-Saiari	(Saudi Arabia) Al-Hazem	12 June 2018	30 June 2019	
17	ST	(Saudi Arabia) Nawaf Bouamer	(Saudi Arabia) Al-Khaleej	22 August 2018	30 June 2019	

==== Winter ====
No.	Pos	Player	Loaned To	Start	End	Source
20	DM	(Saudi Arabia) Abdulaziz Majrashi	(Saudi Arabia) Al-Batin	1 January 2019	30 June 2019	
4	CB	(Saudi Arabia) Faisal Abu Bakr	(Saudi Arabia) Al-Jeel	7 January 2019	30 June 2019	
8	DM	(Saudi Arabia) Osama Al-Khalaf	(Saudi Arabia) Al-Hazem	7 January 2019	30 June 2019	
13	LB	(Saudi Arabia) Osama Al-Saleem	(Saudi Arabia) Al-Kawkab	9 January 2019	30 June 2019	
22	GK	(Saudi Arabia) Abdullah Al Bahri	(Saudi Arabia) Abha	19 January 2019	30 June 2019	

== Pre-season friendlies ==
17 July 2018 Friendly	Al-Ettifaq (Saudi Arabia)	8–0	(Netherlands) AVS Sport	Maurik, Netherlands
18:00 CEST	15' (o.g.); Al-Kwikbi 24'; Guanca 51', 53', 58', 59'; Al-Habib 61', 63'	Report

21 July 2018 Friendly	Al-Ettifaq (Saudi Arabia)	1–1	(Netherlands) Jong Ajax	Amsterdam, Netherlands
11:00 CEST	Guanca 61'	Report	Sierhuis 58'	Stadium: Sportpark De Toekomst

24 July 2018 Friendly	Al-Ettifaq (Saudi Arabia)	2–0	(United Arab Emirates) Baniyas	Tiel, Netherlands
17:00 CEST	Al-Habib 25'; Ben Youssef 76'	Report		Stadium: Sportpark De Lok

27 July 2018 Friendly	Al-Ettifaq (Saudi Arabia)	2–2	(Netherlands) Helmond Sport	Someren, Netherlands
10:40 CEST	Alemán 38'; Kiss 41'	Report	Swinnen 25' van Heugten 45+4'	Stadium: Sportpark de Heikampen

14 August 2018 Friendly	Al-Ettifaq (Saudi Arabia)	3–2	(Bahrain) Al-Ahli	Dammam, Saudi Arabia
18:30 CEST	Alemán 26'; Arias 49'; Kiss 65'	Report	45'; 90+1'	Stadium: Abdullah Al Dabal Stadium

18 August 2018 Friendly	Al-Ettifaq (Saudi Arabia)	5–0	(Bahrain) Al-Riffa	Dammam, Saudi Arabia
18:30 CEST	Guanca 8', 41' (pen.); Ben Youssef 14', 71'; Al-Aboud 67'	Report		Stadium: Abdullah Al Dabal Stadium

19 August 2018 Friendly	Al-Ettifaq (Saudi Arabia)	1–1	(Saudi Arabia) Al-Nahda	Dammam, Saudi Arabia
18:30 CEST	Al-Habib 43'		Ghazwani 30'	Stadium: Prince Fahad bin Salman Stadium

== Competitions ==
=== Overall ===
Competition	Started round	Current position / round	Final position / round	First match	Last match
Professional League	—	—	11th	30 August 2018	16 May 2019
King Cup	Round of 64	—	Quarter-finals	5 January 2019	1 April 2019

Last Updated: 16 May 2019

=== Pro League ===
==== League table ====
Pos	Team	Pld	W	D	L	GF	GA	GD	Pts	Qualification or relegation
9	Al-Fateh	30	8	11	11	32	45	−13	35	
10	Al-Ittihad	30	9	7	14	44	45	−1	34	Qualification for Arab Club Champions Cup
11	Al-Ettifaq	30	8	9	13	40	55	−15	33	
12	Al-Fayha	30	9	5	16	36	52	−16	32	
13	Al-Hazem (O)	30	7	10	13	33	50	−17	31	Qualification for Relegation play-offs

Source: spl.com
Rules for classification: 1) Points; 2) Head-to-head points; 3) Head-to-head goal difference; 4) Total goal difference; 5) Total goals scored; 6) Play-off (only for deciding champion, relegation and AFC competitions participation).
(O) Play-off winners

==== Results summary ====
Overall								Home						Away					
Pld	W	D	L	GF	GA	GD	Pts	W	D	L	GF	GA	GD	W	D	L	GF	GA	GD
30	8	9	13	40	55	−15	33	7	4	4	27	20	+7	1	5	9	13	35	−22

Last updated: 16 May 2019.
Source: Competitive matches

==== Results by round ====
Round	1	2	3	4	5	6	7	8	9	10	11	12	13	14	15	16	17	18	19	20	21	22	23	24	25	26	27	28	29	30
Ground	H	H	H	H	A	H	H	A	H	H	A	A	H	A	H	A	A	A	A	H	A	A	A	H	H	A	H	A	H	A
Result	D	W	W	D	L	W	W	L	L	L	D	L	W	D	W	D	W	L	D	L	D	L	L	D	W	L	D	L	L	L
Position	6	6	3	4	6	5	5	6	6	7	7	9	7	9	8	8	7	7	7	9	9	9	9	9	9	9	9	10	11	11

Updated to match(es) played on 16 May 2019. Source: Competitive matches
A = Away; H = Home; W = Win; D = Draw; L = Loss

==== Matches ====
All times are local, AST (UTC+3).

Win Draw Loss Postponed

30 August 2018 1	Al-Ettifaq	1–1	Al-Raed	Dammam
18:40	Al-Kwikbi 4'; Al-Aboud (yellow card) 18'; Al-Robeai (yellow card) 35'; El Sayed (yellow card) 64'; Majrashi (yellow card) 76'	Report	Al-Fahad (yellow card) 12'; Al-Shehri 89'	Stadium: Prince Mohamed bin Fahd Stadium; Attendance: 2,345; Referee: Simon Lee Evans (Wales)

13 September 2018 2	Al-Ettifaq	3–2	Al-Batin	Dammam
18:25	Guanca 43'; Al-Habib (yellow card) 45+2'; El Sayed (yellow card) 47'; Al-Sonain (yellow card) 53'; Al-Habib 68'; Ben Youssef 81'	Report	Kanabah (yellow card) 59'; Bouhaddouz 74'; Riascos (yellow card) 79'; Sharahili 90+4'	Stadium: Prince Mohamed bin Fahd Stadium; Attendance: 1,876; Referee: Mark Clattenburg (England)

21 September 2018 3	Al-Ettifaq	3–0	Al-Fayha	Dammam
18:15	Guanca 33', 90+5', 90+7'; Kiss (yellow card) 51'; Ben Youssef (yellow card) 56'; Arias (yellow card) 58'; El Sayed (yellow card) 85'; Alemán (yellow card) 90+2'; Hazazi (yellow card) 90+4'	Report	Al-Khaibari (yellow card) 31' (yellow-red card) 61'; Kanno (yellow card) 36'; Ruiz (yellow card) 44'; Buhimed (yellow card) 64' (yellow-red card) 90+3'; Fernández (yellow card) 68'	Stadium: Prince Mohamed bin Fahd Stadium; Attendance: 3,123; Referee: Pavel Královec (Czech Republic)

27 September 2018 4	Al-Ettifaq	0–0	Ohod	Dammam
18:10	Al-Robeai (yellow card) 67'; Al-Sobeai (yellow card) 71'	Report		Stadium: Prince Mohamed bin Fahd Stadium; Attendance: 4,200; Referee: Ravshan Irmatov (Uzbekistan)

20 October 2018 6	Al-Ettifaq	6–2	Al-Ahli	Dammam
17:50	Al-Robeai 8', (yellow card) 28'; Al-Khalaf (yellow card) 32'; Guanca 44'; El Sayed (yellow card) 45+1', (goal) 51'; Alemán 63'; Al-Kwikbi 67'; Al-Habib 79'	Report	Souza 45+5'; Al-Mogahwi (yellow card) 55'; Al-Mowalad (yellow card) 59'; Djaniny (yellow card) 62', (goal) 85'	Stadium: Prince Mohamed bin Fahd Stadium; Attendance: 7,901; Referee: Paweł Gil (Poland)

25 October 2018 7	Al-Ettifaq	1–0	Al-Hazem	Dammam
17:40	Al-Habib (yellow card) 36'; Al-Kwikbi 45+3', (yellow card) 54'; Kiss (yellow card) 76'; El Sayed (yellow card) 90+3'	Report	Al-Munee (yellow card) 74'	Stadium: Prince Mohamed bin Fahd Stadium; Attendance: 4,109; Referee: Tiago Martins (Portugal)

1 November 2018 8	Al-Faisaly	5–1	Al-Ettifaq	Al Majma'ah
18:00	Calderón 18'; Rogerinho 60', 90+2'; Puljić 75'; Al-Shamrani 79'; Luisinho (yellow card) 90'	Report	Al-Robeai (yellow card) 59'; Alemán 81'; Al-Kwikbi (yellow card) 90'	Stadium: King Salman Sport City Stadium; Attendance: 782; Referee: Svein Oddvar Moen (Norway)

6 November 2018 5	Al-Hilal	4–1	Al-Ettifaq	Riyadh
17:55	Al-Dawsari 16'; Carrillo 45+1'; Gomis 55', 70'	Report	Al-Robeai (yellow card) 38'; Guanca 68'	Stadium: Prince Faisal bin Fahd Stadium; Attendance: 10,112; Referee: Milorad Mažić (Serbia)

11 November 2018 9	Al-Ettifaq	1–2	Al-Nassr	Dammam
20:15	Al-Sonain (yellow card) 24'; Hazazi (yellow card) 53'; Al-Robeai 82'; Ben Youssef (yellow card) 89'	Report	Uvini (yellow card) 31'; Giuliano 32'; Amrabat 68'; Khamis (yellow card) 85'	Stadium: Prince Mohamed bin Fahd Stadium; Attendance: 12,284; Referee: Damir Skomina (Slovenia)

24 November 2018 10	Al-Ettifaq	2–4	Al-Taawoun	Khobar
17:30	El Sayed 11'; Al-Kwikbi 17'; Hazazi (yellow card) 37' (yellow-red card) 53'	Report	Tawamba 30', 72' (pen.), (yellow card) 53'; Héldon 49' (pen.); Amissi (yellow card) 52', (goal) 76'	Stadium: Prince Saud bin Jalawi Stadium; Attendance: 1,273; Referee: Tomasz Kwiatkowski (Poland)

29 November 2018 11	Al-Shabab	2–2	Al-Ettifaq	Riyadh
17:45	Budescu 36'; Al-Ammar (yellow card) 45'; Kaabi 64', (yellow card) 80'; Al-Sulayhem (yellow card) 76'; Somália (yellow card) 79'	Report	Guanca 31'; Al-Habib 42'	Stadium: Prince Faisal bin Fahd Stadium; Attendance: 866; Referee: Kevin Blom (Netherlands)

6 December 2018 12	Al-Qadsiah	2–0	Al-Ettifaq	Khobar
17:25	Al-Zain 29'; Camara (yellow card) 83'; Duncan (yellow card) 90+4'; Élton 90+5'	Report	Al-Khairi (yellow card) 32'; Arias (yellow card) 77'; M'Bolhi (yellow card) 86'	Stadium: Prince Saud bin Jalawi Stadium; Attendance: 3,094; Referee: Viktor Kassai (Hungary)

13 December 2018 13	Al-Ettifaq	2–1	Al-Wehda	Dammam
17:30	Guanca 49', 74'; Al-Hazaa (yellow card) 90+5'	Report	Marcos Guilherme 41' (pen.)	Stadium: Prince Mohamed bin Fahd Stadium; Attendance: 2,485; Referee: Mark Clattenburg (England)

21 December 2018 14	Al-Fateh	0–0	Al-Ettifaq	Al-Hasa
17:30	Oueslati (yellow card) 66'	Report	Al-Hazaa (yellow card) 87'; Al-Habib (red card) 90+2'; Arias (yellow card) 90+3'	Stadium: Prince Abdullah bin Jalawi Stadium; Attendance: 3,146; Referee: Hugo Miguel (Portugal)

29 December 2018 15	Al-Ettifaq	1–0	Al-Ittihad	Dammam
17:35	Hazazi (yellow card) 24'; Al-Kwikbi 26'; El Sayed (yellow card) 64'; Al-Sonain (yellow card) 77'	Report	Al-Jadaani (yellow card) 80' (yellow-red card) 90'; Al-Daheem (yellow card) 86'	Stadium: Prince Mohamed bin Fahd Stadium; Attendance: 12,817; Referee: Milorad Mažić (Serbia)

11 January 2019 16	Al-Batin	0–0	Al-Ettifaq	Hafar al-Batin
15:30	Baraka (yellow card) 31'; Al-Hammad (yellow card) 81'; Masrahi (yellow card) 86'; Jhonnattann (yellow card) 88'	Report	Al-Khaibari (yellow card) 18'; Kiss (yellow card) 45+2'; Ben Youssef (yellow card) 47'; Alemán (yellow card) 76'; M'Bolhi (yellow card) 83'	Stadium: Al-Batin Club Stadium; Attendance: 1,436; Referee: Pavel Královec (Czech Republic)

29 January 2019 17	Al-Raed	1–2	Al-Ettifaq	Buraidah
18:25	Abo Shararah (yellow card) 90'; Al-Amri 90+2'	Report	Guanca 9', 45+1'; Al-Robeai (yellow card) 24'; Arias (yellow card) 50'; El Sayed (yellow card) 54'; Al-Aboud (yellow card) 90'	Stadium: King Abdullah Sport City Stadium; Attendance: 1,625; Referee: Simon Lee Evans (Wales)

3 February 2019 18	Ohod	2–1	Al-Ettifaq	Medina
20:15	Fouzair 20', (yellow card) 67'; Majrashi (red card) 35'; Medjani 45+1'; Mohamad (yellow card) 53'	Report	Arias (yellow card) 38'; Al-Sonain (yellow card) 41'; Akaïchi 51'; Alemán (red card) 90+4'	Stadium: Prince Mohammed bin Abdul Aziz Stadium; Attendance: 2,011; Referee: Turki Al-Khudair

8 February 2019 19	Al-Fayha	1–1	Al-Ettifaq	Al Majma'ah
15:45	Kiss 49' (o.g.); Al-Sobhi (yellow card) 55'; Bedoui (yellow card) 90+2'	Report	Al-Hazaa 29'; Al-Robeai (yellow card) 48'	Stadium: King Salman Sport City Stadium; Attendance: 1,315; Referee: Simon Lee Evans (Wales)

13 February 2019 20	Al-Ettifaq	3–4	Al-Faisaly	Dammam
18:10	Kiss (yellow card) 5'; Guanca 20', 32'; Al-Robeai (yellow card) 45+1'; Al-Kwikbi 74'; Al-Sonain (yellow card) 90+4'; Al-Habib (yellow card) 90+6'	Report	Al Ansari 45+2', 90+5'; Denílson 87' (pen.); Luisinho 90+9'	Stadium: Prince Mohamed bin Fahd Stadium; Attendance: 1,968; Referee: Bartosz Frankowski (Poland)

21 February 2019 21	Al-Hazem	1–1	Al-Ettifaq	Ar Rass
18:40	Al-Saiari (yellow card) 23'; Alemão 67' (pen.)	Report	El Sayed (yellow card) 42'; Al-Kwikbi (yellow card) 65'; Guanca 70' (pen.), (yellow card) 79'	Stadium: Al-Hazem Club Stadium; Attendance: 1,572; Referee: Ravshan Irmatov (Uzbekistan)

28 February 2019 22	Al-Taawoun	4–1	Al-Ettifaq	Buraidah
16:00	Adam 6'; Tawamba 37' (pen.), 50', 79', (yellow card) 59'	Report	M'Bolhi (yellow card) 35'; Akaïchi 57'	Stadium: King Abdullah Sport City Stadium; Attendance: 2,557; Referee: Pavel Královec (Czech Republic)

8 March 2019 23	Al-Nassr	3–2	Al-Ettifaq	Riyadh
18:40	Al-Jumeiah (yellow card) 62', (goal) 89'; Hamdallah 70', 90+8'	Report	Alemán (yellow card) 24' (yellow-red card) 45+5'; Arias 27', (yellow card) 90+13'; Al-Kwikbi (yellow card) 46'; Kiss 56', (yellow card) 90+15'; Al-Aboud (yellow card) 72'; El Sayed (red card) 90+11'	Stadium: King Fahd International Stadium; Attendance: 5,843; Referee: Tomasz Musiał (Poland)

15 March 2019 24	Al-Ettifaq	1–1	Al-Shabab	Dammam
20:00	Mahnashi 45+4'; Al-Habib (yellow card) 46'; Salem (yellow card) 88'; Kiss (yellow card) 90+5'	Report	Trawally 23'; Al-Shammeri (yellow card) 52'	Stadium: Prince Mohamed bin Fahd Stadium; Attendance: 3,613; Referee: Szymon Marciniak (Poland)

28 March 2019 25	Al-Ettifaq	3–2	Al-Qadsiah	Dammam
20:30	El Sayed (yellow card) 13'; Al-Sonain (yellow card) 23'; Alemán 45+4'; Al-Hazaa 86'; Akaïchi 90', (yellow card) 90+1'; Al-Aboud (yellow card) 90+4'	Report	Bismark 24' (pen.); Jorge Silva (yellow card) 45'; Élton 83' (pen.), (yellow card) 90+3'	Stadium: Prince Mohamed bin Fahd Stadium; Attendance: 3,442; Referee: Damir Skomina (Slovenia)

6 April 2019 26	Al-Wehda	3–1	Al-Ettifaq	Mecca
20:45	Renato Chaves (yellow card) 16'; Abdu Jaber 45+3'; Jebali 69'; Amr (yellow card) 83'; Kasongo 90+3'	Report	Alemán 19'; Mahnashi (yellow card) 45+1'; Al-Aboud (yellow card) 77'	Stadium: King Abdul Aziz Stadium; Attendance: 940; Referee: Svein Oddvar Moen (Norway)

11 April 2019 27	Al-Ettifaq	0–0	Al-Fateh	Dammam
18:40	Al-Aboud (yellow card) 46'; Al-Robeai (yellow card) 71'	Report	Naâmani (yellow card) 43'; Al-Zaqaan (yellow card) 81'	Stadium: Prince Mohamed bin Fahd Stadium; Attendance: 1,900; Referee: Serdar Gözübüyük (Netherlands)

18 April 2019 28	Al-Ittihad	2–0	Al-Ettifaq	Jeddah
20:45	Al-Bishi 31', 38'	Report	Kiss (yellow card) 64'; Salem (yellow card) 65' (yellow-red card) 88'	Stadium: King Abdullah Sports City; Attendance: 26,840; Referee: Szymon Marciniak (Poland)

11 May 2019 29	Al-Ettifaq	0–1	Al-Hilal	Dammam
22:30	Al-Robeai (yellow card) 18'; A.Al-Habib (yellow card) 27'; H.Al-Habib (yellow card) 72'; Al-Aboud (yellow card) 74'; Al-Haiti (yellow card) 88'	Report	Carlos Eduardo 51'; Bahebri (yellow card) 59'; Botía (yellow card) 62'; Giovinco (yellow card) 78'	Stadium: Prince Mohamed bin Fahd Stadium; Attendance: 10,365; Referee: Damir Skomina (Slovenia)

16 May 2019 30	Al-Ahli	5–0	Al-Ettifaq	Jeddah
22:30	Djaniny 38', 50', 84' (pen.); Al Somah 65'; Ghareeb 89'	Report	Al-Habib (yellow card) 42'; Arias (yellow card) 45+1'; Al-Robeai (yellow card) 59'	Stadium: King Abdullah Sports City; Attendance: 4,000; Referee: Viktor Kassai (Hungary)

=== King Cup ===
All times are local, AST (UTC+3).

5 January 2019 Round of 64	Al-Ettifaq	3–0	Al-Diriyah	Dammam
15:00	Al-Aboud 48'; Al-Selouli 53'; Al-Hazaa 90+2'	Report	Al-Dossari (yellow card) 23'; Al-Bishi (yellow card) 50'	Stadium: Prince Mohamed bin Fahd Stadium; Referee: Shukri Al-Hanfoush

18 January 2019 Round of 32	Al-Ettifaq	9–1	Al-Amjad	Dammam
15:10	Al-Hazaa 4' (pen.), 66', 86'; Dahl 43' (o.g.); Akaïchi 56', 64'; Guanca 75', 83'; El Sayed 80'	Report	Al-Khedewi (yellow card) 10'; Hakami (yellow card) 76'; Faraji 79'; Shamhani (yellow card) 84'; Dahl (yellow card) 90+1'	Stadium: Prince Mohamed bin Fahd Stadium; Referee: Mohammed Al-Hoaish

23 January 2019 Round of 16	Al-Qaisumah	1–4	Al-Ettifaq	Hafar al-Batin
15:30	Sherifi (yellow card) 40'; Salami 55'	Report	Al-Kwikbi (yellow card) 8', (goal) 15'; Ben Youssef 10', 72'; Alemán (yellow card) 44'; Al-Hazaa 61'	Stadium: Al-Batin Club Stadium; Referee: Mohammed Al-Hoaish

1 April 2019 Quarter-finals	Al-Ettifaq	2–3 (a.e.t.)	Al-Hilal	Dammam
18:35	Al-Kwikbi 28' (pen.); Arias (yellow card) 64'; Al-Aboud (yellow card) 75'; Guanca 87', (yellow card) 112'; Akaïchi (yellow card) 90+1'; Al-Sonain (yellow card) 100'	Report	Kanno (yellow card) 32'; Al-Khaibri (yellow card) 38'; Al-Shalhoub 65'; Jahfali 90+5'; Carrillo 105'; Al-Yami (yellow card) 117'	Stadium: Prince Mohamed bin Fahd Stadium; Referee: Matthew Conger (New Zealand)

== Statistics ==
=== Appearances ===
Last updated on 16 May 2019.

No.	Pos	Nat	Player	Total		Pro League		King Cup	
No.	Pos	Nat	Player	Apps	Goals	Apps	Goals	Apps	Goals
Goalkeepers
30	GK	(Saudi Arabia)	Abdullah Al-Saleh	10	0	6+1	0	3	0
35	GK	(Saudi Arabia)	Mohammed Al-Haiti	2	0	1+1	0	0	0
60	GK	(Saudi Arabia)	Abdulkareem Al-Jayaan	0	0	0	0	0	0
92	GK	(Algeria)	Raïs M'Bolhi	23	0	22	0	1	0
Defenders
3	DF	(Saudi Arabia)	Ahmed Al Muhaimeed	0	0	0	0	0	0
12	DF	(Saudi Arabia)	Hussain Qassem	6	0	4+1	0	0+1	0
17	DF	(Saudi Arabia)	Abdullah Al-Hafith	9	0	8+1	0	0	0
21	DF	(Uruguay)	Ramon Arias	29	1	25+1	1	3	0
25	DF	(Saudi Arabia)	Saeed Al-Robeai	19	2	16+2	2	1	0
32	DF	(Saudi Arabia)	Saleh Al-Qumaizi	3	0	2+1	0	0	0
33	DF	(Egypt)	Hussein El Sayed	26	3	22	2	4	1
34	DF	(Saudi Arabia)	Ali Al-Khaibari	8	0	6+1	0	1	0
50	DF	(Saudi Arabia)	Saad Al Khairi	4	0	3	0	1	0
70	DF	(Saudi Arabia)	Omar Al-Sonain	22	0	18+1	0	3	0
72	DF	(Saudi Arabia)	Khalifah Masrahi	2	0	2	0	0	0
77	DF	(Saudi Arabia)	Ahmed Al-Habib	16	0	9+3	0	3+1	0
Midfielders
6	MF	(Saudi Arabia)	Hamed Al-Ghamdi	3	0	0+3	0	0	0
7	MF	(Saudi Arabia)	Mohammed Al-Kwikbi	27	8	24+1	6	2	2
10	MF	(Saudi Arabia)	Hassan Al-Habib	20	3	7+11	3	1+1	0
11	MF	(Saudi Arabia)	Ali Hazazi	26	0	25	0	1	0
14	MF	(Slovakia)	Filip Kiss	26	1	21+1	1	4	0
19	MF	(Argentina)	Cristian Guanca	32	17	29	14	0+3	3
23	MF	(Uruguay)	Brahian Alemán	28	4	25	4	2+1	0
24	MF	(Saudi Arabia)	Abdurahman Al-Aboud	26	1	9+13	0	3+1	1
29	MF	(Saudi Arabia)	Mohammad Al-Subaie	5	0	2+2	0	0+1	0
40	MF	(Saudi Arabia)	Ibrahim Mahnashi	14	1	7+5	1	1+1	0
47	MF	(Saudi Arabia)	Ahmed Al-Dohaim	0	0	0	0	0	0
66	MF	(Saudi Arabia)	Abdulaziz Al-Dawsari	1	0	0	0	0+1	0
88	MF	(Saudi Arabia)	Saad Al-Selouli	5	1	0+3	0	2	1
Forwards
9	FW	(Saudi Arabia)	Hazaa Al-Hazaa	19	7	6+9	2	3+1	5
90	FW	(Tunisia)	Ahmed Akaïchi	17	5	9+5	3	3	2
99	FW	(Tunisia)	Fakhreddine Ben Youssef	21	3	14+5	1	2	2
Players sent out on loan this season
8	MF	(Saudi Arabia)	Osama Al-Khalaf	8	0	4+3	0	0+1	0
13	DF	(Saudi Arabia)	Osama Al-Saleem	0	0	0	0	0	0
20	MF	(Saudi Arabia)	Abdulaziz Majrashi	3	0	2+1	0	0	0
22	GK	(Saudi Arabia)	Abdullah Al Bahri	1	0	1	0	0	0
Player who made an appearance this season but have left the club
80	MF	(Brazil)	Farley	8	0	1+7	0	0	0

=== Goalscorers ===
Rank	No.	Pos	Nat	Name	Pro League	King Cup	Total
1	19	MF	(Argentina)	Cristian Guanca	14	3	17
2	7	MF	(Saudi Arabia)	Mohammed Al-Kwikbi	6	2	8
3	9	FW	(Saudi Arabia)	Hazaa Al-Hazaa	2	5	7
4	90	FW	(Tunisia)	Ahmed Akaïchi	3	2	5
5	23	MF	(Uruguay)	Brahian Alemán	4	0	4
6	10	MF	(Saudi Arabia)	Hassan Al-Habib	3	0	3
6	33	DF	(Egypt)	Hussein El Sayed	2	1	3
6	99	FW	(Tunisia)	Fakhreddine Ben Youssef	1	2	3
9	25	DF	(Saudi Arabia)	Saeed Al-Robeai	2	0	2
10	14	MF	(Slovakia)	Filip Kiss	1	0	1
10	21	DF	(Uruguay)	Ramon Arias	1	0	1
10	24	MF	(Saudi Arabia)	Abdulrahman Al-Aboud	0	1	1
10	40	MF	(Saudi Arabia)	Ibrahim Mahnashi	1	0	1
10	88	MF	(Saudi Arabia)	Saad Al-Selouli	0	1	1
Own goal					0	1	1
Total					40	18	58

Last Updated: 6 April 2019

=== Assists ===
Rank	No.	Pos	Nat	Name	Pro League	King Cup	Total
1	23	MF	(Uruguay)	Brahian Alemán	5	1	6
2	19	MF	(Argentina)	Cristian Guanca	3	1	4
3	10	MF	(Saudi Arabia)	Hassan Al-Habib	3	0	3
3	14	MF	(Slovakia)	Filip Kiss	2	1	3
3	21	DF	(Uruguay)	Ramon Arias	3	0	3
3	24	MF	(Saudi Arabia)	Abdulrahman Al-Aboud	1	2	3
3	33	DF	(Egypt)	Hussein El Sayed	1	2	3
3	99	FW	(Tunisia)	Fakhreddine Ben Youssef	2	1	3
9	7	MF	(Saudi Arabia)	Mohammed Al-Kwikbi	1	1	2
9	9	FW	(Saudi Arabia)	Hazaa Al-Hazaa	2	0	2
9	90	FW	(Tunisia)	Ahmed Akaïchi	1	1	2
12	8	MF	(Saudi Arabia)	Osama Al-Khalaf	1	0	1
12	25	DF	(Saudi Arabia)	Saeed Al-Robeai	1	0	1
12	50	DF	(Saudi Arabia)	Saad Al Khairi	0	1	1
12	77	DF	(Saudi Arabia)	Ahmed Al-Habib	0	1	1
Total					26	12	38

Last Updated: 28 March 2019

=== Clean sheets ===
Rank	No.	Pos	Nat	Name	Pro League	King Cup	Total
1	92	GK	(Algeria)	Raïs M'Bolhi	6	0	6
2	30	GK	(Saudi Arabia)	Abdullah Al-Saleh	1	1	2
Total					7	1	8

Last Updated: 11 April 2019
