= 2019–20 Ettifaq FC season =

Al-Ettifaq
2019–20 season
- President: Khalid Al Dabal
- Manager: Khaled Al-Atwi
- Stadium: Prince Mohamed bin Fahd Stadium
- SPL: 8th
- King Cup: Quarter-finals
- Top goalscorer: League: Filip Kiss (7); All: Filip Kiss (11)
- Highest home attendance: 13,558 vs Al-Hilal (5 October 2019)
- Lowest home attendance: 1,704 vs Al-Hazem (13 February 2020)
- Average home league attendance: 7,156
| Home colours | Away colours |
- All statistics correct as of 9 September 2020.

The 2019–20 season was Al-Ettifaq's 41st non-consecutive season in the Pro League and their 74th season in existence. The club participated in the Pro League and the King Cup.

The season covered the period from 1 July 2019 to 9 September 2020.

== Players ==
=== Squad information ===
As of 1 February 2020

Note: Flags indicate national team as defined under FIFA eligibility rules; some limited exceptions apply. Players may hold more than one non-FIFA nationality.

| No. | Pos. | Nation | Player |
|---|---|---|---|
| 2 | DF | KSA | Ali Masrahi |
| 4 | DF | KSA | Fahad Ghazi |
| 6 | MF | KSA | Ibrahim Mahnashi |
| 7 | MF | KSA | Mohammed Al-Kwikbi |
| 8 | MF | KSA | Hamed Al-Ghamdi |
| 9 | FW | KSA | Hazaa Al-Hazaa |
| 11 | MF | KSA | Ali Hazazi |
| 12 | DF | KSA | Hussain Qassem |
| 13 | MF | TUN | Naïm Sliti |
| 14 | MF | SVK | Filip Kiss |
| 15 | MF | KSA | Saleh Al-Amri |
| 17 | DF | KSA | Saleh Al-Qumaizi |
| 18 | DF | CAF | Cédric Yambéré |
| 19 | FW | SEN | Souleymane Doukara |
| 20 | MF | KSA | Majed Al-Najrani |
| 21 | MF | KSA | Faisal Al-Ghamdi |

| No. | Pos. | Nation | Player |
|---|---|---|---|
| 22 | GK | KSA | Abdullah Al Bahri |
| 25 | DF | KSA | Saeed Al-Robeai |
| 26 | DF | KSA | Khaled Al-Barakah (on loan from Al-Ahli) |
| 27 | MF | KSA | Fawaz Al-Torais |
| 28 | FW | CHA | Maher Sharoma |
| 30 | GK | KSA | Abdullah Al-Saleh |
| 34 | DF | KSA | Ali Al-Khaibari |
| 35 | GK | KSA | Mohammed Al-Haiti |
| 50 | DF | KSA | Saad Al-Khairi |
| 70 | DF | KSA | Abdullah Al-Khateeb |
| 71 | FW | KSA | Abdullah Al Salem |
| 80 | MF | BRA | Souza |
| 88 | MF | KSA | Saad Al-Selouli |
| 92 | GK | ALG | Raïs M'Bolhi (captain) |
| 93 | DF | KSA | Omar Al-Sonain |
| 95 | FW | MAR | Walid Azaro (on loan from Al Ahly) |

=== Out on loan ===
Note: Flags indicate national team as defined under FIFA eligibility rules; some limited exceptions apply. Players may hold more than one non-FIFA nationality.

| No. | Pos. | Nation | Player |
|---|---|---|---|
| 3 | DF | KSA | Ahmed Al Muhaimeed (at Al-Jabalain until 30 June 2020) |
| 5 | DF | TUN | Oussama Haddadi (at Kasımpaşa until 30 June 2020) |
| 47 | MF | KSA | Ahmed Al-Dohaim (at Al-Jeel until 30 June 2020) |

| No. | Pos. | Nation | Player |
|---|---|---|---|
| 90 | MF | KSA | Hisham Al-Farhan (at Al-Thoqbah until 30 June 2020) |
| — | MF | KSA | Abdulaziz Majrashi (at Al-Hazem until 30 June 2020) |

== Transfers and loans ==
=== Transfers in ===
| Entry date | Position | No. | Player | From club | Fee | Ref. |
|---|---|---|---|---|---|---|
| 22 May 2019 | MF | 10 | (Brazil) Rogerinho | (Saudi Arabia) Al-Faisaly | $1,000,000 | |
| 29 May 2019 | DF | 5 | (Tunisia) Oussama Haddadi | (France) Dijon | Free | |
| 18 June 2019 | MF | 20 | (Saudi Arabia) Majed Al-Najrani | (Saudi Arabia) Al-Hilal | Free | |
| 29 June 2019 | DF | 18 | (Central African Republic) Cédric Yambéré | (France) Dijon | Undisclosed | |
| 20 July 2019 | MF | 15 | (Saudi Arabia) Saleh Al-Amri | (Saudi Arabia) Al-Wehda | Free | |
| 11 August 2019 | MF | 13 | (Tunisia) Naïm Sliti | (France) Dijon | $5,600,000 | |
| 21 August 2019 | DF | 70 | (Saudi Arabia) Abdullah Al-Khateeb | (Saudi Arabia) Al-Ahli | Free | |
| 21 August 2019 | MF | 90 | (Saudi Arabia) Hisham Al-Farhan | (Saudi Arabia) Al-Rawdhah | Undisclosed | |
| 22 August 2019 | FW | 19 | (Senegal) Souleymane Doukara | (Turkey) Antalyaspor | Free | |
| 12 January 2020 | FW | 28 | (Chad) Maher Sharoma | (Saudi Arabia) Al-Adalah | Free | |
| 14 January 2020 | MF | 80 | (Brazil) Souza | (Japan) Cerezo Osaka | Free | |
| 26 January 2020 | FW | 71 | (Saudi Arabia) Abdullah Al Salem | (Saudi Arabia) Al-Nassr | Free | |
| 27 January 2020 | MF | – | (Saudi Arabia) Ahmed Al-Ghamdi | (Canada) Pacific FC | Free | |
| 31 January 2020 | DF | 4 | (Saudi Arabia) Fahad Ghazi | (Saudi Arabia) Al-Shabab | Free | |

=== Loans in ===
| Start date | End date | Position | No. | Player | From club | Fee | Ref. |
|---|---|---|---|---|---|---|---|
| 22 January 2020 | End of season | FW | 95 | (Morocco) Walid Azaro | (Egypt) Al Ahly | $400,000 | |
| 31 January 2020 | End of season | DF | 26 | (Saudi Arabia) Khaled Al-Barakah | (Saudi Arabia) Al-Ahli | None | |

=== Transfers out ===
| Exit date | Position | No. | Player | To club | Fee | Ref. |
|---|---|---|---|---|---|---|
| 25 June 2019 | DF | 4 | (Saudi Arabia) Faisel Abu Bakr | (Saudi Arabia) Al-Kawkab | Free | |
| 28 June 2019 | MF | 66 | (Saudi Arabia) Abdulaziz Al-Dawsari | (Saudi Arabia) Al-Nahda | Free | |
| 3 July 2019 | DF | 72 | (Saudi Arabia) Khalifah Masrahi | (Saudi Arabia) Al-Nahda | Free | |
| 4 July 2019 | MF | 24 | (Saudi Arabia) Abdulrahman Al-Aboud | (Saudi Arabia) Al-Ittihad | $3,200,000 | |
| 15 July 2019 | MF | 10 | (Saudi Arabia) Hassan Al-Habib | (Saudi Arabia) Al-Hazem | Undisclosed | |
| 20 July 2019 | FW | – | (Saudi Arabia) Mohammed Al-Saiari | (Saudi Arabia) Al-Wehda | $535,000 | |
| 20 July 2019 | DF | 77 | (Saudi Arabia) Ahmed Al-Habib | (Saudi Arabia) Abha | Free | |
| 31 July 2019 | FW | 90 | (Tunisia) Ahmed Akaïchi | (Lebanon) Al Ahed | Free | |
| 3 August 2019 | MF | 23 | (Uruguay) Brahian Alemán | (Argentina) Gimnasia | Free | |
| 12 August 2019 | DF | 13 | (Saudi Arabia) Osama Al-Saleem | (Saudi Arabia) Al-Khaleej | Free | |
| 27 August 2019 | MF | 8 | (Saudi Arabia) Osama Al-Khalaf | (Saudi Arabia) Al-Hazem | Undisclosed | |
| 6 September 2019 | DF | 21 | (Uruguay) Ramón Arias | (Argentina) San Lorenzo | $600,000 | |
| 2 January 2020 | FW | 99 | (Tunisia) Fakhreddine Ben Youssef | | Released | |

=== Loans out ===
| Start date | End date | Position | No. | Player | To club | Fee | Ref. |
|---|---|---|---|---|---|---|---|
| 2 July 2019 | End of season | FW | 17 | (Saudi Arabia) Nawaf Bouamer | (Saudi Arabia) Al-Nojoom | None | |
| 8 July 2019 | End of season | MF | 20 | (Saudi Arabia) Abdulaziz Majrashi | (Saudi Arabia) Al-Hazem | None | |
| 16 August 2019 | 6 January 2020 | MF | 47 | (Saudi Arabia) Ahmed Al-Dohaim | (Saudi Arabia) Al-Kawkab | None | |
| 31 August 2019 | End of season | MF | – | (Saudi Arabia) Hassan Ghazwani | (Saudi Arabia) Al-Mujazzal | None | |
| 13 January 2020 | End of season | MF | 47 | (Saudi Arabia) Ahmed Al-Dohaim | (Saudi Arabia) Al-Jeel | None | |
| 20 January 2020 | End of season | DF | 3 | (Saudi Arabia) Ahmed Al Muhaimeed | (Saudi Arabia) Al-Jabalain | None | |
| 21 January 2020 | 30 June 2021 | DF | 5 | (Tunisia) Oussama Haddadi | (Turkey) Kasımpaşa | None | |
| 9 February 2020 | End of season | MF | 90 | (Saudi Arabia) Hisham Al-Farhan | (Saudi Arabia) Al-Thoqbah | None | |

== Pre-season ==
| 22 July 2019 Friendly | Al-Ettifaq (Saudi Arabia) | 1–3 | (Algeria) Paradou AC | Maribor, Slovenia |
| 17:00 CEST | Al-Ghamdi 43' (pen.) | Report | Bouguerra; Ghorab; Bouzok |

| 28 July 2019 Friendly | Al-Ettifaq (Saudi Arabia) | 0–4 | (Turkey) Kasımpaşa | Maribor, Slovenia |
| 18:45 CEST | | Report | Thiam 30'; Koita 46'; Khalili 52'; Depe 74' |

| 1 August 2019 Friendly | Al-Ettifaq (Saudi Arabia) | 2–6 | (Slovenia) Triglav Kranj | Maribor, Slovenia |
| 18:45 CEST | Kiss (pen.); Al-Dohaim | Report | Žurga; Majcen; Gajić |

| 4 August 2019 Friendly | Al-Ettifaq (Saudi Arabia) | 2–0 | (United Arab Emirates) Al Ain | Gornja Radgona, Slovenia |
| 18:30 CEST | Rogerinho 65'; Kiss 90' (pen.) | Report | | Stadium: Gornja Radgona Stadium |

| 17 August 2019 Friendly | Al-Ettifaq (Saudi Arabia) | 0–0 | (Saudi Arabia) Al-Shabab | Riyadh, Saudi Arabia |
| 17:45 AST | | Report | | Stadium: Al-Shabab Club Stadium |

== Competitions ==
=== Overall ===
| Competition | Started round | Final position / round | First match | Last match |
|---|---|---|---|---|
| Pro League | — | 8th | 24 August 2019 | 9 September 2020 |
| King Cup | Round of 64 | Quarter-finals | 7 November 2019 | 16 January 2020 |

Updated to match played 9 September 2020
Source: Competitions

=== Overview ===
| Competition | Record | | | | | | | |
| Competition | G | W | D | L | GF | GA | GD | Win % |
|---|---|---|---|---|---|---|---|---|
| Pro League | 30 | 13 | 3 | 14 | 46 | 38 | +8 | 43.33 |
| King Cup | 4 | 3 | 0 | 1 | 16 | 4 | +12 | 75.00 |
| Total | 34 | 16 | 3 | 15 | 62 | 42 | +20 | 47.06 |

Updated to match played 9 September 2020
Source: Competitions

=== Pro League ===
==== League table ====
| Pos | Team | Pld | W | D | L | GF | GA | GD | Pts |
|---|---|---|---|---|---|---|---|---|---|
| 6 | Al-Raed | 30 | 13 | 7 | 10 | 41 | 50 | −9 | 46 |
| 7 | Al-Shabab | 30 | 12 | 7 | 11 | 38 | 37 | +1 | 43 |
| 8 | Al-Ettifaq | 30 | 13 | 3 | 14 | 46 | 38 | +8 | 42 |
| 9 | Abha | 30 | 11 | 5 | 14 | 41 | 52 | −11 | 38 |
| 10 | Damac | 30 | 9 | 8 | 13 | 37 | 52 | −15 | 35 (Note: Positions determined by head-to-head points: Damac: 9 pts; Al-Ittihad: 6 pts; Al-Taawoun: 3 pts.) |

Updated to match(es) played on 9 September 2020. Source: spl.com
Rules for classification: 1) Points; 2) Head-to-head points; 3) Head-to-head goal difference; 4) Total goal difference; 5) Total goals scored; 6) Fair-play points (Note: Head-to-head record is used only after all the matches between the teams in question have been played).

==== Results summary ====
| Overall | | | | | | | | Home | | | | | | Away | | | | | |
| Pld | W | D | L | GF | GA | GD | Pts | W | D | L | GF | GA | GD | W | D | L | GF | GA | GD |
|---|---|---|---|---|---|---|---|---|---|---|---|---|---|---|---|---|---|---|---|
| 30 | 13 | 3 | 14 | 46 | 38 | +8 | 42 | 8 | 0 | 7 | 23 | 19 | +4 | 5 | 3 | 7 | 23 | 19 | +4 |

Last updated: 9 September 2020.

==== Results by round ====
| Round | 1 | 2 | 3 | 4 | 5 | 6 | 7 | 8 | 9 | 10 | 11 | 12 | 13 | 14 | 15 | 16 | 17 | 18 | 19 | 20 | 21 | 22 | 23 | 24 | 25 | 26 | 27 | 28 | 29 | 30 |
|---|---|---|---|---|---|---|---|---|---|---|---|---|---|---|---|---|---|---|---|---|---|---|---|---|---|---|---|---|---|---|
| Ground | A | H | A | H | A | H | A | H | A | H | H | A | H | A | H | H | A | H | A | H | A | H | A | H | A | A | H | A | H | A |
| Result | W | L | W | L | L | L | L | W | D | L | W | L | W | D | L | W | L | L | W | W | L | W | W | W | L | D | W | W | L | L |
| Position | 4 | 8 | 3 | 6 | 9 | 12 | 12 | 10 | 11 | 13 | 11 | 12 | 10 | 10 | 11 | 11 | 11 | 12 | 11 | 10 | 11 | 10 | 9 | 8 | 8 | 8 | 7 | 7 | 8 | 8 |

Updated to match(es) played on 9 September 2020. Source:
A = Away; H = Home; W = Win; D = Draw; L = Loss

==== Matches ====
All times are local, AST (UTC+3).

Win Draw Loss Postponed

| 24 August 2019 1 | Al-Wehda | 0–2 | Al-Ettifaq | Mecca |
| 20:50 | Amr (yellow card) 51'; Bakshween (yellow card) 80'; Al-Saiari (yellow card) 90+1' | Report | Yambéré (yellow card) 8'; Hazazi (yellow card) 35'; Al-Torais 57'; Sliti (yellow card) 67', (goal) 90+6'; Al-Kwikbi (yellow card) 90' | Stadium: King Abdul Aziz Stadium; Attendance: 2,482; Referee: Bakary Gassama (Gambia) |

| 31 August 2019 2 | Al-Ettifaq | 1–2 | Al-Ahli | Dammam |
| 18:40 | Kiss (yellow card) 28'; Sliti 55'; Al-Hazaa (yellow card) 90+4' | Report | Al Somah 45+2'; Al-Khabrani (yellow card) 54' (yellow-red card) 83'; Ghareeb 85' | Stadium: Prince Mohamed bin Fahd Stadium; Attendance: 10,010; Referee: Danny Makkelie (Netherlands) |

| 15 September 2019 3 | Al-Hazem | 0–6 | Al-Ettifaq | Ar Rass |
| 18:50 | | Report | Kiss 14' (pen.); Bakheet 19' (o.g.); Yambéré (yellow card) 27'; Doukara 38' (pen.), 89'; Al-Ghamdi 58'; Rogerinho 66' | Stadium: Al-Hazem Club Stadium; Attendance: 4,050; Referee: Bas Nijhuis (Netherlands) |

| 21 September 2019 4 | Al-Ettifaq | 0–1 | Al-Faisaly | Dammam |
| 18:15 | | Report | Al-Khaibari 46' (o.g.); Qassem (yellow card) 65'; Hyland (yellow card) 71' | Stadium: Prince Mohamed bin Fahd Stadium; Attendance: 8,213; Referee: Bakary Gassama (Gambia) |

| 26 September 2019 5 | Abha | 1–0 | Al-Ettifaq | Abha |
| 18:45 | Gabriel (yellow card) 72'; Atouchi 90+4' | Report | Al Khairi (yellow card) 62'; Mahnashi (yellow card) 67' | Stadium: Prince Sultan bin Abdul Aziz Stadium; Attendance: 8,400; Referee: Kevin Blom (Netherlands) |

| 5 October 2019 6 | Al-Ettifaq | 1–4 | Al-Hilal | Dammam |
| 18:00 | Yambéré (yellow card) 19'; Al-Amri 29', (yellow card) 59'; Haddadi (yellow card) 35'; Mahnashi (yellow card) 40'; Sliti (yellow card) 45+4' | Report | Carlos Eduardo 20' (pen.), 90+4'; Al-Shahrani (yellow card) 28'; Al-Faraj (yellow card) 44'; Cuéllar (yellow card) 45+1'; Al-Shehri 56'; Gomis 76' | Stadium: Prince Mohamed bin Fahd Stadium; Attendance: 13,558; Referee: Anastasios Sidiropoulos (Greece) |

| 19 October 2019 7 | Al-Shabab | 2–1 | Al-Ettifaq | Riyadh |
| 18:05 | Sebá 26', (yellow card) 41'; Salem (yellow card) 45'; Guanca 74'; Al-Shamekh (yellow card) 75'; Al-Hamdan (yellow card) 90+1' | Report | Hazazi (yellow card) 21'; Yambéré 71'; Al-Ghamdi (yellow card) 90' | Stadium: Prince Khalid bin Sultan Stadium; Attendance: 6,172; Referee: Matej Jug (Slovenia) |

| 24 October 2019 8 | Al-Ettifaq | 1–0 | Al-Adalah | Dammam |
| 17:45 | Kiss 70' | Report | | Stadium: Prince Mohamed bin Fahd Stadium; Attendance: 10,085; Referee: Svein Oddvar Moen (Norway) |

| 31 October 2019 9 | Al-Fayha | 1–1 | Al-Ettifaq | Al Majma'ah |
| 18:00 | Fallatah (yellow card) 40'; Ba Masoud 75' | Report | Al-Hazaa 79' | Stadium: Al Majma'ah Sports City; Attendance: 3,652; Referee: Serdar Gözübüyük (Netherlands) |

| 24 November 2019 10 | Al-Ettifaq | 1–2 | Al-Ittihad | Dammam |
| 17:30 | Doukara (yellow card) 45+2' (yellow-red card) 72'; Al-Sahafi 62' (o.g.); Al Khairi (yellow card) 79' | Report | Al-Malki (yellow card) 34', (goal) 51'; Al-Harbi (yellow card) 70'; Yambéré 77' (o.g.); El Ahmadi (yellow card) 86' | Stadium: Prince Mohamed bin Fahd Stadium; Attendance: 11,217; Referee: Ivan Bebek (Croatia) |

| 13 December 2019 11 | Al-Ettifaq | 1–0 | Al-Fateh | Dammam |
| 17:30 | Al-Qumaizi (yellow card) 27'; Mahnashi (yellow card) 41'; Rogerinho 87' | Report | Al Hassan (yellow card) 86'; Al-Fuhaid (yellow card) 89' | Stadium: Prince Mohamed bin Fahd Stadium; Attendance: 2,860; Referee: Bobby Madden (Scotland) |

| 21 December 2019 12 | Al-Raed | 3–2 | Al-Ettifaq | Buraidah |
| 15:20 | Palomeque (yellow card) 25'; Djoum 35'; Daoudi (yellow card) 57'; Al-Ghamdi 77'; Al-Sahli 80' | Report | Al-Khateeb (yellow card) 37'; Al-Amri (yellow card) 42', (goal) 71'; Mahnashi (yellow card) 43' (yellow-red card) 90+4'; Al-Hazaa 48'; M'Bolhi (yellow card) 73' | Stadium: King Abdullah Sport City Stadium; Attendance: 1,408; Referee: Artur Soares Dias (Portugal) |

| 28 December 2019 13 | Al-Ettifaq | 1–0 | Al-Taawoun | Dammam |
| 17:35 | Hazazi (yellow card) 21'; Al-Ghamdi (yellow card) 45'; Al-Hazaa 65'; M'Bolhi (yellow card) 88' | Report | Al-Olayan (yellow card) 45+2'; Héldon (yellow card) 55'; Tawamba (yellow card) 68'; Al-Absi (yellow card) 90' | Stadium: Prince Mohamed bin Fahd Stadium; Attendance: 2,445; Referee: Ivan Kružliak (Slovakia) |

| 11 January 2020 14 | Damac | 2–2 | Al-Ettifaq | Abha |
| 15:50 | Abousaban 35'; Al-Hujaili (yellow card) 57'; Chafaï (yellow card) 71'; Jaafer 73'; Zeghba (yellow card) 88'; Abo Shararah (yellow card) 90+2' | Report | Hazazi (yellow card) 51'; Kiss 57' (pen.); Al-Qumaizi 90+4' | Stadium: Prince Sultan bin Abdul Aziz Stadium; Attendance: 1,320; Referee: Pavel Královec (Czech Republic) |

| 24 January 2020 15 | Al-Ettifaq | 0–1 | Al-Nassr | Dammam |
| 17:55 | Kiss (yellow card) 75'; Souza (yellow card) 83' | Report | Hamdallah 35'; Al-Khaibari (yellow card) 58'; Al-Obaid (yellow card) 79' | Stadium: Prince Mohamed bin Fahd Stadium; Attendance: 11,710; Referee: Szymon Marciniak (Poland) |

| 30 January 2020 16 | Al-Ettifaq | 3–1 | Al-Wehda | Dammam |
| 18:00 | Doukara 11'; Al-Hazaa 51'; Al-Torais (yellow card) 71'; Azaro (yellow card) 88'; Al-Robeai 90+3' | Report | Niakaté 7'; Anselmo (yellow card) 50'; Bakshween (yellow card) 64' | Stadium: Prince Mohamed bin Fahd Stadium; Attendance: 2,006; Referee: Tamás Bognár (Hungary) |

| 6 February 2020 17 | Al-Ahli | 3–2 | Al-Ettifaq | Mecca |
| 20:20 | Al-Mowalad (yellow card) 30'; Al-Mogahwi 79', (yellow card) 90'; Belaïli 85' (pen.), 90+4' (pen.), (yellow card) 90+5' | Report | Al-Robeai (yellow card) 34'; Souza 37'; Kiss 68' (pen.); Al-Qumaizi (yellow card) 78'; Al-Kwikbi (yellow card) 84'; Azaro (yellow card) 90'; Yambéré (yellow card) 90+4'; M'Bolhi (yellow card) 90+4' | Stadium: King Abdul Aziz Stadium; Attendance: 5,018; Referee: Turki Al-Khudhayr |

| 13 February 2020 18 | Al-Ettifaq | 2–3 | Al-Hazem | Dammam |
| 15:30 | Al-Torais (yellow card) 42'; Al-Selouli 51'; Al-Kwikbi 65' | Report | Strandberg (yellow card) 31', (goal) 45+3', 59'; Yoda 49' | Stadium: Prince Mohamed bin Fahd Stadium; Attendance: 1,704; Referee: Matej Jug (Slovenia) |

| 21 February 2020 19 | Al-Faisaly | 1–2 | Al-Ettifaq | Al Majma'ah |
| 18:30 | Guilherme (yellow card) 12'; Qassem (yellow card) 36'; Kaabi 63'; Hyland (yellow card) 82'; Al-Hassan (yellow card) 83' | Report | Azaro 57'; Al-Robeai 65', (yellow card) 90+5' | Stadium: Al Majma'ah Sports City; Attendance: 4,072; Referee: Bakary Gassama (Gambia) |

| 29 February 2020 20 | Al-Ettifaq | 4–1 | Abha | Dammam |
| 18:20 AST (UTC+3) | Azaro 2', 5'; Al-Selouli 19'; Al-Kwikbi 44' (pen.) | Report | Aouadhi (yellow card) 43'; Bguir 51'; Al-Najei (yellow card) 75'; Aashor (yellow card) 81' | Stadium: Prince Mohamed bin Fahd Stadium; Attendance: 4,909; Referee: Andreas Ekberg (Sweden) |

| 7 March 2020 21 | Al-Hilal | 1–0 | Al-Ettifaq | Riyadh |
| 20:40 | Carrillo 17'; Al-Faraj (yellow card) 90+2'; Al-Olayan (yellow card) 90+5' | Report | Mahnashi (yellow card) 74' | Stadium: King Saud University Stadium; Attendance: 0 (Note: Matches from 7 March and onwards will be played behind closed doors due to concerns over the coronavirus pandemic.); Referee: Srđan Jovanović (Serbia) |

| 11 March 2020 22 | Al-Ettifaq | 1–0 | Al-Shabab | Dammam |
| 18:25 | Kiss 66' (pen.); Al Khairi (yellow card) 79'; Al-Torais (yellow card) 90+3' | Report | Al-Khaibri (yellow card) 26'; Salem (yellow card) 64'; Al-Zori (yellow card) 89' | Stadium: Prince Mohamed bin Fahd Stadium; Attendance: 0 Referee: Mattias Gestranius (Finland) |

| 5 August 2020 23 | Al-Adalah | 0–1 | Al-Ettifaq | Al-Hasa |
| 20:30 | Gentsoglou (yellow card) 18' | Report | Al-Robeai 38'; Souza (yellow card) 90+1' | Stadium: Prince Abdullah bin Jalawi Stadium; Attendance: 0 Referee: Georgi Kabakov (Bulgaria) |

| 9 August 2020 24 | Al-Ettifaq | 3–2 | Al-Fayha | Dammam |
| 19:00 | Mahnashi (yellow card) 48'; Kiss 56' (pen.); Doukara 57'; Hazazi 90+5' | Report | Al-Sobhi 9'; Al-Baqawi (yellow card) 19'; Al-Khaibari 45+1'; Al-Juhaim (yellow card) 90+1' | Stadium: Prince Mohamed bin Fahd Stadium; Attendance: 0 Referee: Mattias Gestranius (Finland) |

| 14 August 2020 25 | Al-Ittihad | 1–0 | Al-Ettifaq | Jeddah |
| 20:50 | Uvini (yellow card) 26'; Al-Aboud (yellow card) 39'; Al-Muwallad 54' (pen.); Al-Sahafi (yellow card) 74'; Grohe (yellow card) 90'; Al-Bishi (yellow card) 90+3' | Report | Kiss (yellow card) 40'; Al-Robeai (yellow card) 60'; M'Bolhi (red card) 90+7' | Stadium: King Abdullah Sports City; Attendance: 0 Referee: Daniel Stefański (Poland) |

| 19 August 2020 26 | Al-Fateh | 1–1 | Al-Ettifaq | Al-Hasa |
| 18:50 | Naji (yellow card) 3'; Al-Fuhaid (yellow card) 13' (yellow-red card) 27'; Aguirregaray 20', (yellow card) 36'; Al-Yousef (yellow card) 67' | Report | Doukara 8'; Mahnashi (yellow card) 52'; Hazazi (yellow card) 90' | Stadium: Prince Abdullah bin Jalawi Stadium; Attendance: 0 Referee: Faisal Al-Blwi |

| 24 August 2020 27 | Al-Ettifaq | 4–0 | Al-Raed | Dammam |
| 18:45 | Al Salem 7'; Doukara 13'; Kiss 45+3' (pen.); Al-Khateeb (yellow card) 76'; Al-Hazaa 90+5' | Report | Djoum (yellow card) 20'; Daoudi (yellow card) 57'; Al-Sahli (yellow card) 87' | Stadium: Prince Mohamed bin Fahd Stadium; Attendance: 0 Referee: Matthew Conger (New Zealand) |

| 30 August 2020 28 | Al-Taawoun | 0–1 | Al-Ettifaq | Buraidah |
| 19:00 | Amissi (yellow card) 24' (yellow-red card) 90+1'; Al-Ruwaili (yellow card) 33'; Al-Mousa (yellow card) 86' | Report | Al Salem 34'; Kiss (yellow card) 39' | Stadium: King Abdullah Sport City Stadium; Attendance: 0 Referee: Shukri Al-Hanfoush |

| 4 September 2020 29 | Al-Ettifaq | 0–2 | Damac | Dammam |
| 20:35 | Mahnashi (yellow card) 1' | Report | Zelaya 21'; Harzan 63'; Zeghba (yellow card) 90+3' | Stadium: Prince Mohamed bin Fahd Stadium; Attendance: 0 Referee: Majed Al-Shamrani |

| 9 September 2020 30 | Al-Nassr | 3–2 | Al-Ettifaq | Riyadh |
| 20:35 | Hamdallah 7' (pen.); Maicon (yellow card) 38'; Giuliano 45+2'; Adam 72'; Al-Obaid (yellow card) 84' | Report | Al-Amri 19'; Al-Hazaa 90+2' | Stadium: Prince Faisal bin Fahd Stadium; Attendance: 0 Referee: João Pinheiro (Portugal) |

=== King Cup ===
All times are local, AST (UTC+3).

| 7 November 2019 Round of 64 | Al-Taqadom | 0–6 | Al-Ettifaq | Unaizah |
| 15:25 | Al-Hadhriti (yellow card) 80' | Report | Kiss 13', 26'; Haddadi 54'; Al-Kwikbi 60'; Yambéré 76', (yellow card) 87'; Mahnashi (yellow card) 80'; Al-Hazaa 83' | Stadium: Al-Najma Club Stadium; Referee: Majed Al-Shamrani |

| 6 December 2019 Round of 32 | Al-Ettifaq | 2–1 | Al-Tai | Dammam |
| 17:25 | Al-Selouli 80'; Al-Hazaa 86'; Mahnashi (yellow card) 90+4' | Report | Al-Aqel (yellow card) 37'; Silva 61' | Stadium: Prince Mohamed bin Fahd Stadium; Referee: Khaled Al-Senani |

| 3 January 2020 Round of 16 | Al-Ettifaq | 7–1 | Ohod | Dammam |
| 17:40 | Kiss 10' (pen.), (yellow card) 22'; Sliti 34', 76'; Al-Kwikbi (yellow card) 67', (goal) 70', 79'; Al-Hazaa 69'; Al-Robeai 88' | Report | Al-Qarni (yellow card) 8'; Al-Motawaa (yellow card) 37'; Al-Enezi 83' | Stadium: Prince Mohamed bin Fahd Stadium; Referee: Tamás Bognár (Hungary) |

| 16 January 2020 Quarter-finals | Al-Hilal | 2–1 | Al-Ettifaq | Riyadh |
| 18:05 | Al-Shehri 4', 96'; Bahebri (yellow card) 55'; Giovinco (yellow card) 78' | Report | Al-Hazaa (yellow card) 45+2'; Mahnashi (yellow card) 64'; Al-Robeai (red card) 72'; Al-Amri (yellow card) 81'; Kiss 85' (pen.); Al-Kwikbi (yellow card) 115' | Stadium: King Saud University Stadium; Attendance: 18,731; Referee: Bobby Madden (Scotland) |

== Statistics ==
=== Appearances ===
Last updated on 9 September 2020.

| No. | Pos | Nat | Player | Total | | Pro League | | King Cup | |
| No. | Pos | Nat | Player | Apps | Goals | Apps | Goals | Apps | Goals |
Goalkeepers
| 30 | GK | (Saudi Arabia) KSA | Abdullah Al-Saleh | 1 | 0 | 0 | 0 | 1 | 0 |
| 35 | GK | (Saudi Arabia) KSA | Mohammed Al-Haiti | 2 | 0 | 2 | 0 | 0 | 0 |
| 92 | GK | (Algeria) ALG | Raïs M'Bolhi | 31 | 0 | 28 | 0 | 3 | 0 |
Defenders
| 2 | DF | (Saudi Arabia) KSA | Ali Masrahi | 0 | 0 | 0 | 0 | 0 | 0 |
| 4 | DF | (Saudi Arabia) KSA | Fahad Ghazi | 2 | 0 | 2 | 0 | 0 | 0 |
| 12 | DF | (Saudi Arabia) KSA | Hussain Qassem | 1 | 0 | 0 | 0 | 0+1 | 0 |
| 17 | DF | (Saudi Arabia) KSA | Saleh Al-Qumaizi | 29 | 1 | 24+2 | 1 | 3 | 0 |
| 18 | DF | (Central African Republic) CAF | Cédric Yambéré | 30 | 2 | 22+4 | 1 | 4 | 1 |
| 25 | DF | (Saudi Arabia) KSA | Saeed Al-Robeai | 21 | 4 | 18+1 | 3 | 2 | 1 |
| 26 | DF | (Saudi Arabia) KSA | Khaled Al-Barakah | 1 | 0 | 1 | 0 | 0 | 0 |
| 34 | DF | (Saudi Arabia) KSA | Ali Al-Khaibari | 2 | 0 | 1 | 0 | 0+1 | 0 |
| 50 | DF | (Saudi Arabia) KSA | Saad Al Khairi | 14 | 0 | 8+5 | 0 | 1 | 0 |
| 70 | DF | (Saudi Arabia) KSA | Abdullah Al-Khateeb | 13 | 0 | 9+3 | 0 | 1 | 0 |
| 93 | DF | (Saudi Arabia) KSA | Omar Al-Sonain | 0 | 0 | 0 | 0 | 0 | 0 |
Midfielders
| 6 | MF | (Saudi Arabia) KSA | Ibrahim Mahnashi | 29 | 0 | 24+2 | 0 | 3 | 0 |
| 7 | MF | (Saudi Arabia) KSA | Mohammed Al-Kwikbi | 25 | 5 | 19+3 | 2 | 2+1 | 3 |
| 8 | MF | (Saudi Arabia) KSA | Hamed Al-Ghamdi | 20 | 1 | 7+11 | 1 | 1+1 | 0 |
| 10 | MF | (Brazil) BRA | Rogerinho | 12 | 2 | 10+2 | 2 | 0 | 0 |
| 11 | MF | (Saudi Arabia) KSA | Ali Hazazi | 29 | 1 | 14+11 | 1 | 4 | 0 |
| 13 | MF | (Tunisia) TUN | Naïm Sliti | 22 | 4 | 15+4 | 2 | 3 | 2 |
| 14 | MF | (Slovakia) SVK | Filip Kiss | 28 | 11 | 24+1 | 7 | 3 | 4 |
| 15 | MF | (Saudi Arabia) KSA | Saleh Al-Amri | 21 | 3 | 9+9 | 3 | 1+2 | 0 |
| 20 | MF | (Saudi Arabia) KSA | Majed Al-Najrani | 5 | 0 | 0+4 | 0 | 0+1 | 0 |
| 21 | MF | (Saudi Arabia) KSA | Faisal Al-Ghamdi | 0 | 0 | 0 | 0 | 0 | 0 |
| 27 | MF | (Saudi Arabia) KSA | Fawaz Al-Torais | 19 | 1 | 8+8 | 1 | 2+1 | 0 |
| 80 | MF | (Brazil) BRA | Souza | 17 | 1 | 15+1 | 1 | 0+1 | 0 |
| 88 | MF | (Saudi Arabia) KSA | Saad Al-Selouli | 17 | 3 | 11+4 | 2 | 0+2 | 1 |
Forwards
| 9 | FW | (Saudi Arabia) KSA | Hazaa Al-Hazaa | 27 | 9 | 8+15 | 6 | 4 | 3 |
| 19 | FW | (Senegal) SEN | Souleymane Doukara | 32 | 6 | 25+4 | 6 | 2+1 | 0 |
| 28 | FW | (Chad) CHA | Maher Sharoma | 0 | 0 | 0 | 0 | 0 | 0 |
| 71 | FW | (Saudi Arabia) KSA | Abdullah Al Salem | 10 | 2 | 7+3 | 2 | 0 | 0 |
Players sent out on loan this season
| 3 | DF | (Saudi Arabia) KSA | Ahmed Al Muhaimeed | 0 | 0 | 0 | 0 | 0 | 0 |
| 5 | DF | (Tunisia) TUN | Oussama Haddadi | 18 | 1 | 14 | 0 | 4 | 1 |
| 90 | MF | (Saudi Arabia) KSA | Hisham Al-Farhan | 1 | 0 | 0 | 0 | 0+1 | 0 |
| 95 | FW | (Morocco) MAR | Walid Azaro | 7 | 3 | 5+2 | 3 | 0 | 0 |

=== Goalscorers ===
| Rank | No. | Pos | Nat | Name | Pro League | King Cup | Total |
|---|---|---|---|---|---|---|---|
| 1 | 14 | MF | (Slovakia) | Filip Kiss | 7 | 4 | 11 |
| 2 | 9 | FW | (Saudi Arabia) | Hazaa Al-Hazaa | 6 | 3 | 9 |
| 3 | 19 | FW | (Senegal) | Souleymane Doukara | 6 | 0 | 6 |
| 4 | 7 | MF | (Saudi Arabia) | Mohammed Al-Kwikbi | 2 | 3 | 5 |
| 5 | 13 | MF | (Tunisia) | Naïm Sliti | 2 | 2 | 4 |
| 5 | 25 | DF | (Saudi Arabia) | Saeed Al-Robeai | 3 | 1 | 4 |
| 7 | 15 | MF | (Saudi Arabia) | Saleh Al-Amri | 3 | 0 | 3 |
| 7 | 88 | MF | (Saudi Arabia) | Saad Al-Selouli | 2 | 1 | 3 |
| 7 | 95 | FW | (Morocco) | Walid Azaro | 3 | 0 | 3 |
| 10 | 10 | MF | (Brazil) | Rogerinho | 2 | 0 | 2 |
| 10 | 18 | DF | (Central African Republic) | Cédric Yambéré | 1 | 1 | 2 |
| 10 | 71 | FW | (Saudi Arabia) | Abdullah Al Salem | 2 | 0 | 2 |
| 13 | 5 | DF | (Tunisia) | Oussama Haddadi | 0 | 1 | 1 |
| 13 | 8 | MF | (Saudi Arabia) | Hamed Al-Ghamdi | 1 | 0 | 1 |
| 13 | 11 | MF | (Saudi Arabia) | Ali Hazazi | 1 | 0 | 1 |
| 13 | 17 | DF | (Saudi Arabia) | Saleh Al-Qumaizi | 1 | 0 | 1 |
| 13 | 27 | MF | (Saudi Arabia) | Fawaz Al-Torais | 1 | 0 | 1 |
| 13 | 80 | MF | (Brazil) | Souza | 1 | 0 | 1 |
| Own goal | | | | | 2 | 0 | 2 |
| Total | | | | | 46 | 16 | 62 |

Last Updated: 9 September 2020

=== Clean sheets ===
| Rank | No. | Pos | Nat | Name | Pro League | King Cup | Total |
|---|---|---|---|---|---|---|---|
| 1 | 92 | GK | (Algeria) | Raïs M'Bolhi | 8 | 1 | 9 |
| 2 | 35 | GK | (Saudi Arabia) | Mohammed Al-Haiti | 1 | 0 | 1 |
| Total | | | | | 9 | 1 | 10 |

Last Updated: 30 August 2020
