= 2020–21 Al-Taawoun FC season =

Al-Taawoun
2020–21 season
- President: Saud Al-Rashoodi
- Manager: Patrice Carteron (until 21 March); Nestor El Maestro (from 13 March)
- Stadium: King Abdullah Sport City Stadium
- SPL: 4th
- King Cup: Runners-up
- Top goalscorer: League: Léandre Tawamba (13); All: Léandre Tawamba (17)
- Highest home attendance: 5,760 vs Al-Hilal (23 May 2021)
Home colours
- All statistics correct as of 30 May 2021.

The 2020–21 season was Al-Taawoun's 65th year in their history and 11th consecutive season in the Pro League. This season Al-Taawoun participated in the Pro League and the King Cup.

The season covers the period from 27 September 2020 to 30 June 2021.

== Players ==
=== Squad information ===
As of 4 February 2019

Note: Flags indicate national team as defined under FIFA eligibility rules; some limited exceptions apply. Players may hold more than one non-FIFA nationality.

No.	Pos.	Nation	Player
1	GK	BRA	Cássio
2	DF	KSA	Yassin Barnawi
3	FW	CMR	Léandre Tawamba
4	DF	BRA	Iago Santos
5	MF	KSA	Ryan Al-Mousa
6	DF	KSA	Mohammed Al-Ghamdi (on loan from Ohod)
8	MF	KSA	Sumayhan Al-Nabit
10	MF	PAR	Kaku
11	MF	KSA	Ali Al-Nemer
12	DF	KSA	Abdulkareem Al-Muziel (on loan from Al-Nassr)
13	DF	KSA	Ibrahim Al-Zubaidi
14	DF	KSA	Hassan Kadesh
15	MF	KSA	Fahad Al-Rashidi
16	DF	KSA	Fahad Al-Hamad
17	MF	BDI	Cédric Amissi
21	GK	KSA	Moataz Al-Baqaawi

No.	Pos.	Nation	Player
23	GK	KSA	Hussain Shae'an
24	FW	KSA	Mohammad Al-Sahlawi
25	DF	KSA	Faisal Darwish
26	GK	KSA	Mohammed Al-Dhulayfi
27	FW	SEN	Abdoulaye Sané
29	MF	KSA	Abdullah Al-Jouei
31	DF	KSA	Saad Balobaid
33	DF	KSA	Ahmed Assiri
50	MF	KSA	Mutair Al-Zahrani
55	MF	BRA	Sandro Manoel
63	MF	KSA	Amjad Hawsawi
66	MF	KSA	Mohammed Abousaban
85	DF	KSA	Nawaf Al-Sobhi
88	DF	KSA	Hamdan Al-Ruwaili
95	MF	KSA	Mohammed Al-Harbi
99	FW	KSA	Malek Al-Abdulmenem

==== Out on loan ====
Note: Flags indicate national team as defined under FIFA eligibility rules; some limited exceptions apply. Players may hold more than one non-FIFA nationality.

No.	Pos.	Nation	Player
7	FW	AUS	Mitchell Duke (at Western Sydney Wanderers until 30 June 2021)
19	MF	KSA	Ibrahim Al-Otaybi (at Al-Diriyah until 30 June 2021)
30	MF	KSA	Nawaf Al-Rashwodi (at Al-Arabi until 30 June 2021)

No.	Pos.	Nation	Player
44	MF	KSA	Saleh Al-Saeed (at Al-Bukiryah until 30 June 2021)
—	MF	KSA	Faisal Al-Mutairi (at Al-Arabi until 30 June 2021)

== Transfers and loans ==
=== Transfers in ===
Entry date	Position	No.	Player	From club	Fee	Ref.
27 September 2020	DF	4	(Brazil) Iago Santos	(Portugal) Moreirense	Free	
27 September 2020	MF	29	(Saudi Arabia) Abdullah Al-Jouei	(Saudi Arabia) Damac	End of loan	
27 September 2020	MF	50	(Saudi Arabia) Mutair Al-Zahrani	(Saudi Arabia) Al-Ain	Free	
27 September 2020	FW	7	(Australia) Mitchell Duke	(Australia) Western Sydney Wanderers	Free	
27 September 2020	FW	9	(Saudi Arabia) Mansour Al-Muwallad	(Saudi Arabia) Damac	End of loan	
27 September 2020	FW	27	(Senegal) Abdoulaye Sané	(France) Sochaux	Free	
7 October 2020	FW	–	(Angola) Ary Papel	(Angola) 1º de Agosto	Free	
21 October 2020	DF	85	(Saudi Arabia) Nawaf Al-Sobhi	(Saudi Arabia) Al-Fayha	Undisclosed	
26 October 2020	MF	11	(Saudi Arabia) Ali Al-Nemer	(Saudi Arabia) Al-Wehda	Free	
1 February 2021	MF	10	(Paraguay) Kaku	(United States) New York Red Bulls	Free	

=== Loans in ===
Start date	End date	Position	No.	Player	To club	Fee	Ref.
19 October 2020	End of season	DF	6	(Saudi Arabia) Mohammed Al-Ghamdi	(Saudi Arabia) Ohod	None	
26 October 2020	End of season	DF	12	(Saudi Arabia) Abdulkareem Al-Muziel	(Saudi Arabia) Al-Nassr	None	

=== Transfers out ===
Exit date	Position	No.	Player	To club	Fee	Ref.
9 September 2020	DF	5	(Saudi Arabia) Talal Al-Absi	(Saudi Arabia) Al-Ahli	Free	
14 September 2020	MF	8	(Brazil) Nildo Petrolina		Released	
27 September 2020	MF	11	(Saudi Arabia) Nasser Al-Daajani	(Saudi Arabia) Al-Ahli	End of loan	
27 September 2020	MF	27	(Saudi Arabia) Sultan Mandash	(Saudi Arabia) Al-Ahli	End of loan	
27 September 2020	MF	41	(Saudi Arabia) Thaar Al-Otaibi	(Saudi Arabia) Al-Hilal	End of loan	
27 September 2020	MF	20	(Cape Verde) Héldon Ramos	(United Arab Emirates) Shabab Al Ahli Club	Free	
27 September 2020	MF	80	(Saudi Arabia) Abdulmajeed Al-Swat	(Saudi Arabia) Al-Ittihad	Free	
1 October 2020	MF	24	(Saudi Arabia) Sufyan Al-Oufi	(Saudi Arabia) Al-Saqer	Free	
18 October 2020	MF	7	(Saudi Arabia) Rabee Sufyani	(Saudi Arabia) Al-Ain	Free	
21 October 2020	FW	9	(Saudi Arabia) Mansour Al-Muwallad	(Saudi Arabia) Damac	Undisclosed	
29 October 2020	FW	–	(Angola) Ary Papel	(Egypt) Ismaily	Free	
25 January 2021	DF	4	(Portugal) Ricardo Machado	(Portugal) Penafiel	Free	

=== Loans out ===
Start date	End date	Position	No.	Player	To club	Fee	Ref.
4 November 2020	End of season	MF	30	(Saudi Arabia) Nawaf Al-Rashwodi	(Saudi Arabia) Al-Arabi	None	
4 November 2020	End of season	MF	44	(Saudi Arabia) Saleh Al-Saeed	(Saudi Arabia) Al-Bukiryah	None	
4 November 2020	End of season	MF	–	(Saudi Arabia) Faisal Al-Mutairi	(Saudi Arabia) Al-Arabi	None	
20 January 2021	End of season	MF	19	(Saudi Arabia) Ibrahim Al-Otaybi	(Saudi Arabia) Al-Diriyah	None	
1 February 2021	End of season	FW	7	(Australia) Mitchell Duke	(Australia) Western Sydney Wanderers	None	

== Competitions ==
=== Overview ===
Competition	Record							
Competition	G	W	D	L	GF	GA	GD	Win %
Pro League	30	13	8	9	42	30	+12	43.33
King Cup	4	3	0	1	9	7	+2	75.00
Total	34	16	8	10	51	37	+14	47.06

Updated to match played 30 May 2021
Source: Competitions

=== Pro League ===
==== League table ====
Pos	Team	Pld	W	D	L	GF	GA	GD	Pts	Qualification or relegation
2	Al-Shabab	30	17	6	7	68	43	+25	57	Qualification for AFC Champions League group stage
3	Al-Ittihad (Note: Al-Ittihad cannot qualify for Asian Football Confederation competitions as they did not obtain an AFC license.)	30	15	11	4	45	29	+16	56	
4	Al-Taawoun	30	13	8	9	42	30	+12	47 (Note: Positions determined by head-to-head points: Al-Taawoun 4 pts; Al-Ettifaq 1 pt.)	Qualification for AFC Champions League play-off round
5	Al-Ettifaq	30	14	5	11	50	48	+2	47	
6	Al-Nassr	30	13	7	10	53	40	+13	46	

Source: spl.com source=إحصائيات رابطة دوري المحترفين السعودي 2020-2021
Rules for classification: 1) Points; 2) Head-to-head points; 3) Head-to-head goal difference; 4) Total goal difference; 5) Total goals scored; 6) Fair-play points (Note: Head-to-head record is used only after all the matches between the teams in question have been played).

==== Results summary ====
Overall								Home						Away					
Pld	W	D	L	GF	GA	GD	Pts	W	D	L	GF	GA	GD	W	D	L	GF	GA	GD
30	13	8	9	42	30	+12	47	7	4	4	25	16	+9	6	4	5	17	14	+3

Last updated: 30 May 2021.
Source: spl.com.sa

==== Results by round ====
Round	1	2	3	4	5	6	7	8	9	10	11	12	13	14	15	16	17	18	19	20	21	22	23	24	25	26	27	28	29	30
Ground	H	H	A	A	H	H	A	A	H	A	A	H	A	A	H	A	A	H	H	A	A	H	H	A	H	H	A	H	H	A
Result	D	W	L	D	W	D	D	D	W	L	W	D	W	L	W	D	L	L	L	W	W	D	W	W	W	W	W	L	L	L
Position	9	8	11	11	7	8	6	8	4	7	6	6	4	5	5	4	5	6	8	7	5	5	4	4	4	4	3	4	4	4

Updated to match(es) played on 30 May 2021. Source: spl.com.sa
A = Away; H = Home; W = Win; D = Draw; L = Loss

==== Matches ====
All times are local, AST (UTC+3).

Win Draw Loss Postponed

17 October 2020 1	Al-Taawoun	1–1	Al-Faisaly	Buraidah
18:10	Santos 2'; Assiri (yellow card) 22'; Darwish (yellow card) 44'; Al-Jouei (yellow card) 55'	Report	Merkel (yellow card) 40'; Faik (yellow card) 47'; Al-Sharid (yellow card) 78'; Rossi 80'	Stadium: King Abdullah Sport City Stadium; Attendance: 0 Referee: Faisal Al-Blwi

22 October 2020 2	Al-Taawoun	1–0	Al-Nassr	Buraidah
18:05	Al-Mousa (red card) 9'; Santos (yellow card) 21'; Amissi (yellow card) 45+1'; Tawamba 63'	Report	Al-Hassan (yellow card) 48'; Yahya (yellow card) 51'; Al-Alawi (yellow card) 86'	Stadium: King Abdullah Sport City Stadium; Attendance: 0 Referee: Mohammed Al-Hoaish

29 October 2020 3	Al-Qadsiah	1–0	Al-Taawoun	Khobar
19:50	Al-Yami (yellow card) 68'; Williams (yellow card) 76'; Vitas 79'	Report	Assiri (yellow card) 24'; Al-Hamad (yellow card) 50'; Al-Nabit (yellow card) 70'	Stadium: Prince Saud bin Jalawi Stadium; Attendance: 0 Referee: Raed Al-Zahrani

6 November 2020 4	Al-Ittihad	1–1	Al-Taawoun	Jeddah
19:45	El Ahmadi (yellow card) 51'; Prijović (yellow card) 51'; Romarinho 59' (pen.)	Report	Al-Jouei (yellow card) 44', (goal) 73'; Duke (yellow card) 45+1'	Stadium: King Abdullah Sports City; Attendance: 0 Referee: Mohammed Al-Qarni

24 November 2020 5	Al-Taawoun	1–0	Al-Wehda	Buraidah
17:50	Al-Jouei (yellow card) 55'; Al-Hafith 72' (o.g.)	Report	Al-Jayzani (red card) 52'	Stadium: King Abdullah Sport City Stadium; Attendance: 0 Referee: Sultan Al-Harbi

29 November 2020 6	Al-Taawoun	1–1	Al-Ettifaq	Buraidah
15:15	Al-Robeai 13' (o.g.); Santos (yellow card) 59'; Tawamba (yellow card) 80'	Report	Al-Robeai (yellow card) 26'; Kiss 44' (pen.), (yellow card) 67'	Stadium: King Abdullah Sport City Stadium; Attendance: 0 Referee: Mohammed Al-Hoaish

5 December 2020 7	Al-Batin	1–1	Al-Taawoun	Hafar al-Batin
17:35	Abreu 3', (yellow card) 45'; Chaves (yellow card) 84'; Campaña (yellow card) 90+1'	Report	Barnawi (yellow card) 40'; Al-Mousa (yellow card) 68'; Al-Nabit 90+3'	Stadium: Al-Batin Club Stadium; Attendance: 0 Referee: Shukri Al-Hanfoush

12 December 2020 8	Abha	0–0	Al-Taawoun	Abha
15:35	Goodwin (yellow card) 38'; Aouadhi (yellow card) 43'	Report	Abousaban (yellow card) 69'	Stadium: Prince Sultan bin Abdul Aziz Stadium; Attendance: 0 Referee: Raed Al-Zahrani

21 December 2020 9	Al-Taawoun	4–0	Al-Shabab	Buraidah
17:55	Tawamba (yellow card) 14', (goal) 75' (pen.); Santos 41'; Al-Sobhi (yellow card) 55'; Sandro 65'; Al-Abdulmenem 90+4'	Report	Bajandouh (yellow card) 39'; Banega (yellow card) 49'; Sharahili (yellow card) 64'; Al-Dubaysh (yellow card) 90'	Stadium: King Abdullah Sport City Stadium; Attendance: 0 Referee: Faisal Al-Blwi

27 December 2020 10	Al-Ain	1–0	Al-Taawoun	Al Bahah
15:45	Moutari (yellow card) 6'; Juanpi 16'; Getterson (yellow card) 42'	Report	Manoel (yellow card) 33'; Al-Sobhi (yellow card) 39'; Barnawi (yellow card) 51'	Stadium: King Saud Sport City Stadium; Attendance: 0 Referee: Abdullah Al-Shehri

2 January 2021 11	Al-Ahli	0–3	Al-Taawoun	Mecca
18:30		Report	Amissi (yellow card) 11'; Sané 30'; Al-Jouei 35'; Tawamba 45'; Kadesh (yellow card) 66'; Al-Nabit (yellow card) 69'	Stadium: King Abdul Aziz Stadium; Attendance: 0 Referee: Mohammed Al-Hoaish

9 January 2021 12	Al-Taawoun	0–0	Al-Raed	Buraidah
15:30	Al-Nabit (yellow card) 31'; Santos (yellow card) 36'; Kadesh (yellow card) 45'; Amissi (yellow card) 59'; Abousaban (yellow card) 76'	Report	Fallatah (yellow card) 48' (yellow-red card) 53'	Stadium: King Abdullah Sport City Stadium; Attendance: 0 Referee: Khaled Al-Teris

14 January 2021 13	Al-Fateh	1–2	Al-Taawoun	Al-Hasa
17:50	Bendebka 11'; Boushal (yellow card) 90+5'	Report	Assiri (yellow card) 10'; Al-Daheem 45+2' (o.g.); Santos 50'	Stadium: Prince Abdullah bin Jalawi Stadium; Attendance: 0 Referee: Sandro Schärer (Switzerland)

20 January 2021 14	Al-Hilal	2–0	Al-Taawoun	Riyadh
18:10	Gomis 2'; Al-Shahrani (yellow card) 21'; Vietto (yellow card) 35', (goal) 50'; Giovinco (yellow card) 64'; Al-Breik (yellow card) 65'	Report	Amissi (yellow card) 7'; Santos (yellow card) 39'; Abousaban (yellow card) 66'	Stadium: Prince Faisal bin Fahd Stadium; Attendance: 0 Referee: Faisal Al-Blwi

25 January 2021 15	Al-Taawoun	3–1	Damac	Buraidah
15:40	Tawamba 6', 47', 87'; Al-Nabit (yellow card) 54'; Kadesh (yellow card) 60'	Report	Antolić 9' (pen.); Abdullah (yellow card) 21'; Majrashi (red card) 67'	Stadium: King Abdullah Sport City Stadium; Attendance: 0 Referee: Majed Al-Shamrani

30 January 2021 16	Al-Faisaly	0–0	Al-Taawoun	Al Majma'ah
15:40	Rossi (yellow card) 73'; Al-Saiari (yellow card) 83'	Report	Santos (yellow card) 26'; Tawamba (yellow card) 45+2'; Abousaban (yellow card) 86'	Stadium: Al Majma'ah Sports City; Attendance: 0 Referee: Abdullah Al-Shehri

4 February 2021 17	Al-Nassr	3–0	Al-Taawoun	Riyadh
20:15	Lajami (yellow card) 9'; Al-Najei 40'; Petros (yellow card) 49'; Hamdallah 59' (pen.); Amrabat (yellow card) 68'; Al-Sulayhem 90+4'; Al-Khaibari (yellow card) 90+7'	Report	Amissi (yellow card) 35'; Sandro (yellow card) 45'; Al-Nemer (yellow card) 50'; Al-Mousa (yellow card) 90+2'; Assiri (yellow card) 90+2'	Stadium: Mrsool Park; Attendance: 0 Referee: Sultan Al-Harbi

13 February 2021 18	Al-Taawoun	0–2	Al-Qadsiah	Buraidah
15:50	Amissi (yellow card) 26'; Al-Mousa (yellow card) 39'	Report	Andria 6'; Al-Amri 54'	Stadium: King Abdullah Sport City Stadium; Attendance: 0 Referee: Khaled Salwi

18 February 2021 19	Al-Taawoun	1–2	Al-Ittihad	Buraidah
15:55	Sané 16'; Al-Mousa (yellow card) 65'; Al-Zubaidi (yellow card) 86'	Report	Romarinho 49'; Cássio 68' (o.g.)	Stadium: King Abdullah Sport City Stadium; Attendance: 0 Referee: Mohammed Al-Qarni

22 February 2021 20	Al-Wehda	0–2	Al-Taawoun	Mecca
19:00	Al-Jayzani (yellow card) 76'; Anselmo (yellow card) 84'; Bakshween (yellow card) 90+4'	Report	Kaku 24'; Abousaban (yellow card) 40'; Al-Abdulmenem (yellow card) 73'; Amissi (yellow card) 84'; Al-Nabit (yellow card) 87'; Tawamba 89' (pen.)	Stadium: King Abdul Aziz Stadium; Attendance: 0 Referee: Faisal Al-Blwi

27 February 2021 21	Al-Ettifaq	0–3	Al-Taawoun	Dammam
18:15	Kiss (yellow card) 59'; Azaro (yellow card) 79'	Report	Kaku 26'; Al-Nabit 46'; Tawamba 90+4'	Stadium: Prince Mohamed bin Fahd Stadium; Attendance: 0 Referee: Mohammed Al-Esmaiel

4 March 2021 22	Al-Taawoun	2–2	Al-Batin	Buraidah
18:45	Tawamba 6', 45+3', (yellow card) 38'; Al-Zubaidi (yellow card) 69'	Report	Hyland (yellow card) 32'; Al-Shammeri (yellow card) 59'; Abreu 77', (yellow card) 90+2'; Al-Mozairib 84'	Stadium: King Abdullah Sport City Stadium; Attendance: 0 Referee: Mohammed Al-Beredi

10 March 2021 23	Al-Taawoun	1–0	Abha	Buraidah
18:50	Santos (yellow card) 61'; Al-Nabit 72'; Cássio (yellow card) 90+4'	Report	Amr (yellow card) 45'; Zidan (yellow card) 52'; Strandberg (yellow card) 61'	Stadium: King Abdullah Sport City Stadium; Attendance: 0 Referee: Majed Al-Shamrani

20 March 2021 24	Al-Shabab	1–3	Al-Taawoun	Riyadh
18:40	Sebá 90+1'	Report	Kaku 29'; Al-Ghamdi (yellow card) 40'; Assiri 42'; Abousaban (yellow card) 53'; Al-Zubaidi (yellow card) 61'; Tawamba 67'; Al-Mousa (yellow card) 77'	Stadium: Prince Khalid bin Sultan Stadium; Attendance: 0 Referee: Majed Al-Shamrani

9 April 2021 25	Al-Taawoun	3–0	Al-Ain	Buraidah
19:00	Al-Jouei 29'; Al-Ghamdi (yellow card) 40'; Abousaban (yellow card) 63'; Santos 76'; Tawamba (yellow card) 89'; Kaku 90+5' (pen.)	Report	Ndiaye (yellow card) 45+4'; Al-Sohaymi (yellow card) 47'; Moutari (yellow card) 56'; Al-Jamaan (yellow card) 72'	Stadium: King Abdullah Sport City Stadium; Attendance: 0 Referee: Khaled Salwi

25 April 2021 28	Al-Taawoun	3–4	Al-Fateh	Buraidah
22:00	Tawamba 11'; Al-Zubaidi (yellow card) 14'; Assiri (yellow card) 40'; Abousaban (yellow card) 40'; Saâdane 45' (o.g.); Santos (yellow card) 76'; Kaku 90+2' (pen.)	Report	Santos 16' (o.g.); Bendebka 55', 76'; Cueva (yellow card) 60'; Majrashi 80'	Stadium: King Abdullah Sport City Stadium; Attendance: 0 Referee: Mohammed Al-Qarni

7 May 2021 26	Al-Taawoun	4–2	Al-Ahli	Buraidah
21:50	Tawamba 21'; Assiri (yellow card) 27', (goal) 90+1'; Al-Ghamdi (yellow card) 40' (yellow-red card) 69'; Kaku 54' (pen.); Al-Nemer 90+5'	Report	Al-Mogahwi (yellow card) 30'; Al-Moasher 42', 71' (pen.); Hawsawi (yellow card) 72'	Stadium: King Abdullah Sport City Stadium; Attendance: 0 Referee: Sultan Al-Harbi

15 May 2021 27	Al-Raed	1–2	Al-Taawoun	Buraidah
19:20	Majrashi (yellow card) 11'; Al-Mogren 82'; Al-Fahad (yellow card) 90+1'	Report	Al-Jouei (yellow card) 22'; Al-Nabit 45+1'; Kaku 47'; Kadesh (yellow card) 73'	Stadium: King Abdullah Sport City Stadium; Attendance: 0 Referee: Mohammed Al-Hoaish

23 May 2021 29	Al-Taawoun	0–1	Al-Hilal	Buraidah
21:00	Al-Mousa (yellow card) 19'; Al-Nabit (yellow card) 31'; Santos (yellow card) 53'; Abousaban (yellow card) 57'; Al-Sobhi (yellow card) 70'; Al-Zubaidi (yellow card) 73'; Al-Sahlawi (yellow card) 89'	Report	Gomis 5', (yellow card) 66'; Al-Faraj (yellow card) 68'; Cuéllar (yellow card) 86'; Al-Mayouf (yellow card) 90+2'	Stadium: King Abdullah Sport City Stadium; Attendance: 5,760; Referee: Faisal Al-Blwi

30 May 2021 30	Damac	2–0	Al-Taawoun	Abha
21:00	Al-Nakhli (yellow card) 39'; Zelaya 41' (pen.), 52' (pen.), (yellow card) 85'; Antolić (yellow card) 73'; Munshi (yellow card) 82'; Vittor (yellow card) 84'	Report	Al-Sobhi (yellow card) 50'; Al-Nemer (yellow card) 90+4'	Stadium: Prince Sultan bin Abdul Aziz Stadium; Attendance: 2,241; Referee: Sultan Al-Harbi

=== King Cup ===
All times are local, AST (UTC+3).

16 December 2020 Round of 16	Damac	1–2	Al-Taawoun	Abha
15:35	Fallatah (yellow card) 39'; Abdullah (yellow card) 68'; Abo Shararah (yellow card) 88'; Zelaya 90+1'	Report	Amissi 2'; Barnawi (yellow card) 13' (yellow-red card) 45'; Duke (yellow card) 64'; Kadesh (yellow card) 68'; Tawamba 76'; Abousaban (yellow card) 90'	Stadium: Prince Sultan bin Abdul Aziz Stadium; Attendance: 0 Referee: Majed Al-Shamrani

15 March 2021 Quarter-finals	Al-Taawoun	2–1	Al-Qadsiah	Buraidah
20:45	Tawamba 10'; Al-Zubaidi (yellow card) 16'; Al-Nabit (yellow card) 44', (goal) 58'; Amissi (yellow card) 67'; Abousaban (yellow card) 74'; Al-Ghamdi (yellow card) 90+8'	Report	Hazazi (yellow card) 3'; Al-Amri 37'; Williams (yellow card) 90+9'	Stadium: King Abdullah Sport City Stadium; Attendance: 0 Referee: Mohammed Al-Hoaish

4 April 2021 Semi-finals	Al-Taawoun	3–2	Al-Fateh	Buraidah
19:00	Assiri (yellow card) 11'; Kaku 25'; Tawamba 55'; Amissi 62'; Al-Zubaidi (yellow card) 69'; Sané (yellow card) 90'; Al-Mousa (yellow card) 90+6'	Report	Saâdane (yellow card) 42' te Vrede (yellow card) 51'; Majrashi 72'; Batna 74'; Al-Hassan (yellow card) 76'	Stadium: King Abdullah Sport City Stadium; Attendance: 0 Referee: Faisal Al-Blwi

27 May 2021 Final	Al-Taawoun	2–3	Al-Faisaly	Riyadh
21:00	Tawamba 14'; Assiri (yellow card) 39'; Kaku 45' (pen.); Al-Nabit (yellow card) 51'; Amissi (yellow card) 65'	Report	Tavares 40' (pen.), 60', 90+3'; Omar (yellow card) 71'; Majrashi (yellow card) 86'	Stadium: King Fahd International Stadium; Referee: Szymon Marciniak (Poland)

== Statistics ==
=== Appearances ===
Last updated on 30 May 2021.

No.	Pos	Nat	Player	Total		Pro League		King Cup	
No.	Pos	Nat	Player	Apps	Goals	Apps	Goals	Apps	Goals
Goalkeepers
1	GK	(Brazil) BRA	Cássio	32	0	28	0	4	0
23	GK	(Saudi Arabia) KSA	Hussain Shae'an	2	0	2	0	0	0
26	GK	(Saudi Arabia) KSA	Mohammed Al-Dhulayfi	0	0	0	0	0	0
Defenders
2	DF	(Saudi Arabia) KSA	Yassin Barnawi	27	0	18+7	0	2	0
4	DF	(Brazil) BRA	Iago Santos	29	4	25	4	4	0
6	DF	(Saudi Arabia) KSA	Mohammed Al-Ghamdi	15	0	10+2	0	2+1	0
12	DF	(Saudi Arabia) KSA	Abdulkareem Al-Muziel	0	0	0	0	0	0
13	DF	(Saudi Arabia) KSA	Ibrahim Al-Zubaidi	17	0	11+4	0	2	0
14	DF	(Saudi Arabia) KSA	Hassan Kadesh	29	0	19+6	0	2+2	0
16	DF	(Saudi Arabia) KSA	Fahad Al-Hamad	5	0	5	0	0	0
25	DF	(Saudi Arabia) KSA	Faisal Darwish	15	0	5+8	0	0+2	0
31	DF	(Saudi Arabia) KSA	Saad Balobaid	4	0	1+3	0	0	0
33	DF	(Saudi Arabia) KSA	Ahmed Assiri	21	2	18	2	3	0
85	DF	(Saudi Arabia) KSA	Nawaf Al-Sobhi	19	0	13+2	0	1+3	0
Midfielders
5	MF	(Saudi Arabia) KSA	Ryan Al-Mousa	25	0	12+10	0	1+2	0
8	MF	(Saudi Arabia) KSA	Sumayhan Al-Nabit	30	5	21+5	4	3+1	1
10	MF	(Paraguay) PAR	Kaku	14	9	11	7	3	2
11	MF	(Saudi Arabia) KSA	Ali Al-Nemer	17	1	3+14	1	0	0
15	MF	(Saudi Arabia) KSA	Fahad Al-Rashidi	7	0	3+4	0	0	0
17	MF	(Burundi) BDI	Cédric Amissi	30	2	24+2	0	4	2
29	MF	(Saudi Arabia) KSA	Abdullah Al-Jouei	30	3	15+12	3	2+1	0
50	MF	(Saudi Arabia) KSA	Mutair Al-Zahrani	10	0	5+4	0	1	0
55	MF	(Brazil) BRA	Sandro Manoel	21	1	15+4	1	2	0
63	MF	(Saudi Arabia) KSA	Amjad Hawsawi	0	0	0	0	0	0
66	MF	(Saudi Arabia) KSA	Mohammed Abousaban	27	0	15+9	0	1+2	0
Forwards
3	FW	(Cameroon) CMR	Léandre Tawamba	31	17	27	13	4	4
24	FW	(Saudi Arabia) KSA	Mohammad Al-Sahlawi	13	0	1+11	0	0+1	0
27	FW	(Senegal) SEN	Abdoulaye Sané	30	2	14+13	2	2+1	0
99	FW	(Saudi Arabia) KSA	Malek Al-Abdulmenem	7	1	1+6	1	0	0
Players sent out on loan this season
7	FW	(Australia) AUS	Mitchell Duke	13	0	8+4	0	1	0
19	MF	(Saudi Arabia) KSA	Ibrahim Al-Otaybi	0	0	0	0	0	0

=== Goalscorers ===
Rank	No.	Pos	Nat	Name	Pro League	King Cup	Total
1	3	FW	(Cameroon)	Léandre Tawamba	13	4	17
2	10	MF	(Paraguay)	Kaku	7	2	9
3	8	MF	(Saudi Arabia)	Sumayhan Al-Nabit	4	1	5
4	4	DF	(Brazil)	Iago Santos	4	0	4
5	29	MF	(Saudi Arabia)	Abdullah Al-Jouei	3	0	3
6	17	MF	(Burundi)	Cédric Amissi	0	2	2
6	27	FW	(Senegal)	Abdoulaye Sané	2	0	2
6	33	DF	(Saudi Arabia)	Ahmed Assiri	2	0	2
8	11	MF	(Saudi Arabia)	Ali Al-Nemer	1	0	1
8	55	MF	(Brazil)	Sandro Manoel	1	0	1
8	99	FW	(Saudi Arabia)	Malek Al-Abdulmenem	1	0	1
Own goal					4	0	4
Total					42	9	51

Last Updated: 30 May 2021

=== Assists ===
Rank	No.	Pos	Nat	Name	Pro League	King Cup	Total
1	3	FW	(Cameroon)	Léandre Tawamba	6	0	6
1	10	MF	(Paraguay)	Kaku	4	2	6
3	27	FW	(Senegal)	Abdoulaye Sané	3	1	4
4	8	MF	(Saudi Arabia)	Sumayhan Al-Nabit	3	0	3
4	17	MF	(Burundi)	Cédric Amissi	1	2	3
4	29	MF	(Saudi Arabia)	Abdullah Al-Jouei	3	0	3
7	55	MF	(Brazil)	Sandro Manoel	2	0	2
8	11	MF	(Saudi Arabia)	Ali Al-Nemer	1	0	1
8	14	DF	(Saudi Arabia)	Hassan Kadesh	1	0	1
8	33	DF	(Saudi Arabia)	Ahmed Assiri	0	1	1
Total					24	6	30

Last Updated: 30 May 2021

=== Clean sheets ===
Rank	No.	Pos	Nat	Name	Pro League	King Cup	Total
1	1	GK	(Brazil)	Cássio	11	0	11
Total					11	0	11

Last Updated: 30 May 2021
