= Ramón Hernández (disambiguation) =

Ramón Hernández (born 1976) is a Venezuelan Major League Baseball catcher.

Ramón Hernández may also refer to:

- Ramón Hernández (third baseman) (1907–?), Cuban baseball player in the Negro leagues
- Ramón Hernández (pitcher) (1940–2009), Puerto Rican baseball pitcher
- Ramón Hernández (fencer) (born 1953), Cuban Olympic fencer
- Ramón Hernández Torres (born 1960), Puerto Rican politician and mayor of Juana Díaz
- Ramón Hernández (beach volleyball) (born 1972), beach volleyball player from Puerto Rico
- Ramón Montalvo Hernández (born 1974), Mexican PRD politician
- Ramon Hernandez, fictional character in Marvel's Lasher (comics)

== See also ==
- Ramon Fernandez (disambiguation)
