= César Mena Porta =

Personal information
- Full name: César Mena Porta
- Date of birth: Unknown
- Place of birth: Villarrica, Paraguay
- Date of death: Unknown
- Position: Defender

Senior career*
Years	Team	Apps	(Gls)
- Club Olimpia

International career
1922–1925	Paraguay	10	(0)
- * Club domestic league appearances and goals

César Mena Porta was a Paraguayan footballer who played as a defender. He represented the Paraguay national football team between 1922 and 1925, making ten international appearances. At club level, he played for Club Olimpia, winning four Paraguayan league championships.

== Club career ==
Mena Porta played for Club Olimpia, one of Paraguay's most successful football clubs. During his time with the club, he won the Paraguayan Primera División championship in 1912, 1914 and 1916.

He secured a fourth league title with Olimpia in 1925, adding to his achievements in Paraguayan domestic football.

== International career ==
Mena Porta represented Paraguay in three editions of the Copa América: 1922, 1923 and 1925. He also participated in the 1924 Copa Chevallier Boutell against Argentina.

=== 1922 South American Championship ===
Mena Porta was selected for Paraguay's squad at the 1922 South American Championship, where the national team finished as runners-up.

He appeared in four matches, facing Brazil, Chile, Uruguay and Argentina.

Paraguay and Brazil finished level on points, requiring a championship play-off to determine the winner. Mena Porta did not participate in the deciding match, in which he was replaced by Ramón González. Brazil won the play-off and claimed the title.

=== 1923 South American Championship ===
Mena Porta returned to the national squad for the 1923 South American Championship, in which Paraguay finished third.

He made two appearances during the tournament, playing against Argentina and Uruguay.

=== 1924 Copa Chevallier Boutell ===
In 1924, Mena Porta participated in the Copa Chevallier Boutell, an international football competition contested between Paraguay and Argentina.

He played in both matches against Argentina.

=== 1925 South American Championship ===
Mena Porta made his third and final appearance at the continental championship during the 1925 South American Championship.

Paraguay finished third in the three-team tournament. He played in two matches, appearing once against Argentina and once against Brazil.

This marked the end of his recorded international career, during which he earned ten caps without scoring a goal.

== Honours ==
Club Olimpia

- Paraguayan Primera División: 1912, 1914, 1916, 1925

Paraguay

- South American Championship runner-up: 1922
