= Ramón Rodríguez =

Ramón Rodríguez may refer to:

- Daddy Yankee (born 1977), born Ramón Luis Ayala Rodríguez, Puerto Rican rapper
- Ramón Rodríguez (actor), Puerto Rican-American actor
- Ramón Rodríguez (Salvadoran politician), politician from El Salvador
- Ramón Rodríguez (American politician), American politician
- Ramón Rodríguez (footballer), Peruvian footballer
- Ramón Rodríguez Soto (born 1928), Costa Rican footballer
