= Ramón Arroyo =

Ramón Arroyo may refer to:

- Ramón Arroyo (footballer), Spanish footballer
- Ramón Arroyo (athlete), Spanish athlete
