= Ramón Romero =

Ramón Romero is the name of:

- Ramón Romero (baseball), Dominican baseball player
- Ramón Romero Roa, Paraguayan politician
- Ramón Ceja Romero, Mexican politician
- Ramon Romero Jr., American politician
