= Ramón Flores =

Ramón Flores may refer to:

- Ramón Flores (baseball), Venezuelan baseball player
- Ramón Flores (footballer) (born 1982), Salvadoran footballer
- Ramón Flores (trumpet player), Mexican trumpet player
