= Ramón Báez =

Ramón Báez may refer to:

- Ramón Báez (politician) (1858–1929), Dominican physician and politician
- Ramón Báez Romano (1929–2022), Dominican businessman, politician, golfist, and grandson of the above
- Ramón Báez Figueroa (born 1956), Dominican chairman, banker, and son of the above
