= Ramón Sánchez =

Ramón Sánchez may refer to:

- Ramón "Chunky" Sánchez (1951—2016), San Diego-based Chicano musician, folklorist, teacher, and activist
- Ramón Sánchez (footballer) (born 1982), Salvadoran football player
- Ramón Sánchez Gómez (1938–2009), Spanish flamenco guitarist, composer, and lyricist
- Ramón Sánchez-Parodi Montoto (born 1938), Cuban diplomat and writer
- Ramón Sánchez-Pizjuán (1900–1956), Spanish lawyer
