= Saeed Al-Rubaie =

Saudi Arabian footballer (born 1994)

Personal information
- Full name: Saeed Awadh Al-Rubaie Al-Yami
- Date of birth: June 4, 1994 (age 32)
- Place of birth: Najran, Saudi Arabia
- Height: 1.83 m (6 ft 0 in)
- Position: Defender

Team information
- Current team: Al-Okhdood
- Number: 4

Youth career
- –2013: Al-Okhdood
- 2013–2015: Al-Ahli

Senior career*
Years	Team	Apps	(Gls)
2015–2018	Al-Ahli	2	(0)
2015–2016	→ Al-Ettifaq (loan)	22	(2)
2017–2018	→ Al-Faisaly (loan)	17	(0)
2018–2022	Al-Ettifaq	80	(7)
2022–2024	Al-Shabab	7	(0)
2023–2024	→ Al-Okhdood (loan)	26	(2)
2024–2026	Al-Okhdood	46	(5)
2026–	Al-Diriyah	0	(0)

International career^{‡}
2015–2016	Saudi Arabia U23		
2018–	Saudi Arabia	2	(0)
- * Club domestic league appearances and goals as of 17:57, 25 August 2026 (UTC) ‡ National team caps and goals as of 15:00, 17 November 2020 (UTC)

Saeed Awadh Al Rubaie Al Yami (Arabic: سعيد الربيعي; born 4 June 1994) is a Saudi Arabian professional footballer who plays as a defender for Saudi Pro League club Al-Diriyah.

== Career ==
Al-Rubaie began his career at Al-Okhdood before joining Al-Ahli in 2013. On 12 September 2015, Al-Rubaie joined Al-Ettifaq on a one-year loan. On 26 July 2016, Al-Rubaie renewed his contract with Al-Ahli. On 22 August 2017, Al-Rubaie joined Al-Faisaly on a one-year loan. On 31 July 2018, Al-Rubaie joined Al-Ettifaq in a swap deal which saw Mohammed Al-Zubaidi join Al-Ahli. On 7 April 2022, Al-Rubaie joined Al-Shabab on a three-year contract. On 19 August 2023, Al-Rubaie joined Al-Okhdood on a one-year loan.

On 18 June 2024, Al-Rubaie joined Al-Okhdood on a two-year deal.

== Personal life ==
Saeed is the brother of the players Hamad Al-Rabaei and Abdullah Al-Rubaie and the cousin of the players Mohammed Al Rubaie and Masoud Al-Rubaie.

== Career statistics ==
=== Club ===
As of 30 August 2025

Club	Season	League			King Cup		Crown Prince Cup (Note: Discontinued in September 19, 2017)		Asia		Other		Total	
Club	Season	Division	Apps	Goals	Apps	Goals	Apps	Goals	Apps	Goals	Apps	Goals	Apps	Goals
Al-Ettifaq (loan)	2015–16	First Division	22	2	0	0	1	0	—		—		23	2
Al-Ahli	2016–17	Pro League	2	0	1	0	2	0	1	0	0	0	6	0
Al-Faisaly (loan)	2017–18	Pro League	17	0	2	1	0	0	—		1 (Note: Appearances in Arab Club Champions Cup)	0	20	1
Al-Ettifaq	2018–19	Pro League	18	2	1	0	—		—		—		19	2
Al-Ettifaq	2019–20	Pro League	19	3	2	1	—		—		—		21	4
Al-Ettifaq	2020–21	Pro League	18	2	0	0	—		—		—		18	2
Al-Ettifaq	2021–22	Pro League	25	0	1	0	—		—		—		26	0
Al-Ettifaq	Club Total		80	7	4	1	0	0	0	0	0	0	84	8
Al-Shabab	2022–23	Pro League	7	0	0	0	—		2	1	—		9	1
Al-Shabab	2023–24	Pro League	0	0	0	0	—		—		3	0	3	0
Al-Shabab	Club Total		7	0	0	0	0	0	2	1	3	0	12	1
Al-Okhdood	2023–24	Pro League	26	2	0	0	—		—		—		26	2
Al-Okhdood	2024–25	Pro League	27	1	0	0	—		—		—		27	1
Al-Okhdood	2025–26	Pro League	1	0	0	0	—		—		—		1	0
Career Total			182	12	7	2	3	0	3	1	4	0	199	15

== Honours ==
Al-Ettifaq

- Saudi First Division: 2015–16
