= Ramón Ramírez =

Ramón Ramírez may refer to:

- Ramón Ramírez (footballer) (born 1969), retired Mexican association football (soccer) player
- Ramón Ramírez (Panamanian pitcher) (born 1977), Panamanian professional baseball pitcher
- Ramón Ramírez (Dominican pitcher) (born 1981), Dominican professional baseball pitcher
- Ramón Ramírez (Venezuelan pitcher) (born 1982), Venezuelan professional baseball pitcher
- Ramón Antonio Ramírez, Dominican politician and businessman
- Ramón Ramírez Valtierra (born 1964), Mexican politician
- Ramón Ramírez (catcher) (born 2005), Venezuelan professional baseball catcher and designated hitter in the Kansas City Royals organization
