= Ramón Blanco =

Ramón Blanco may refer to:

- Ramón Blanco (alpine skier) (1925–2021), Spanish Olympic skier
- Ramón Blanco y Erenas (1833–1906), Spanish soldier
- Ramón Blanco (footballer) (1952–2013), Spanish professional footballer
