= Ramón Sender =

Ramón Sender may refer to:

- Ramón J. Sender (1901–1982), Spanish and American novelist and essayist
- Ramón Sender (composer) (born 1934), Spanish and American composer, visual artist, and writer; son of Ramón J. Sender
