= Ramón Hernández (third baseman) =

Cuban baseball player (1907-??)

- Third baseman / Catcher
- Born: 1907; Havana, Cuba
- Threw: Right

Negro league baseball debut
- 1929, for the Cuban Stars (West)

Last appearance
- 1930, for the Cuban Stars (West)

Negro National League statistics
- Batting average: .227
- Home runs: 9
- Runs batted in: 36

Teams
- Cuban Stars (West) (1929–1930)

Ramón Hernández (1907 – death date unknown) was a Cuban professional baseball third baseman and catcher in the Negro leagues in 1929 and 1930.

A native of Havana, Cuba, Hernández made his Negro leagues debut in 1929 with the Cuban Stars (West), and played for the Stars again the following season.
