= Ramon Fernandez (disambiguation) =

Ramon Fernandez (born 1953) is a Filipino former professional basketball player and current commissioner of the Philippine Sports Commission

Ramon Fernandez may also refer to:

- Ramón J. Fernández (1878–1964), Filipino businessman and politician
- Ramón Fernández (baseball) (1920–1979), Venezuelan baseball player
- Ramón Fernández (footballer) (born 1984), Argentine-Chilean footballer
- Ramon Fernandez (judge) (1916–1997), Filipino lawyer and judge
- Ramón Fernández-Pacheco (born 1983), Spanish politician

== See also ==
- Ramón Hernández (disambiguation)
