= Hussain Qassem =

Saudi Arabian footballer

Hussain Qassem حسين قاسم
Personal information
- Full name: Hussain Saleh Qassem Salem
- Date of birth: September 21, 1997 (age 29)
- Place of birth: Riyadh, Saudi Arabia
- Height: 1.79 m (5 ft 10 in)
- Position: Left back

Team information
- Current team: Al-Fateh
- Number: 12

Youth career
- –2018: Al-Hilal

Senior career*
Years	Team	Apps	(Gls)
2018–2020	Al-Ettifaq	5	(0)
2020–2022	Al-Faisaly	36	(0)
2022–2025	Al-Tai	51	(0)
2025–	Al-Fateh	0	(0)

International career
2017–2019	Saudi Arabia U23		
- * Club domestic league appearances and goals as of 12 August 2023

Hussain Qasim (Arabic: حسين قاسم, born 21 September 1997) is a Saudi Arabian professional footballer who plays as a left back for Pro League side Al-Fateh.

== Career ==
Hussain Qassem started his career at the youth team of Al-Hilal. On 1 August 2018, Hussain Qassem left Al-Hilal and joined Pro League side Al-Ettifaq. On 14 September 2020, Hussain Qassem left Al-Ettifaq and joined Pro League side Al-Faisaly. On 28 July 2022, Qassem joined Al-Tai on a two-year deal. On 31 January 2025, Qassem joined Al-Fateh.

== Honours ==
=== Club ===
Al-Faisaly

- King Cup: 2020–21
