= Brahian Alemán =

Uruguayan footballer (born 1989)

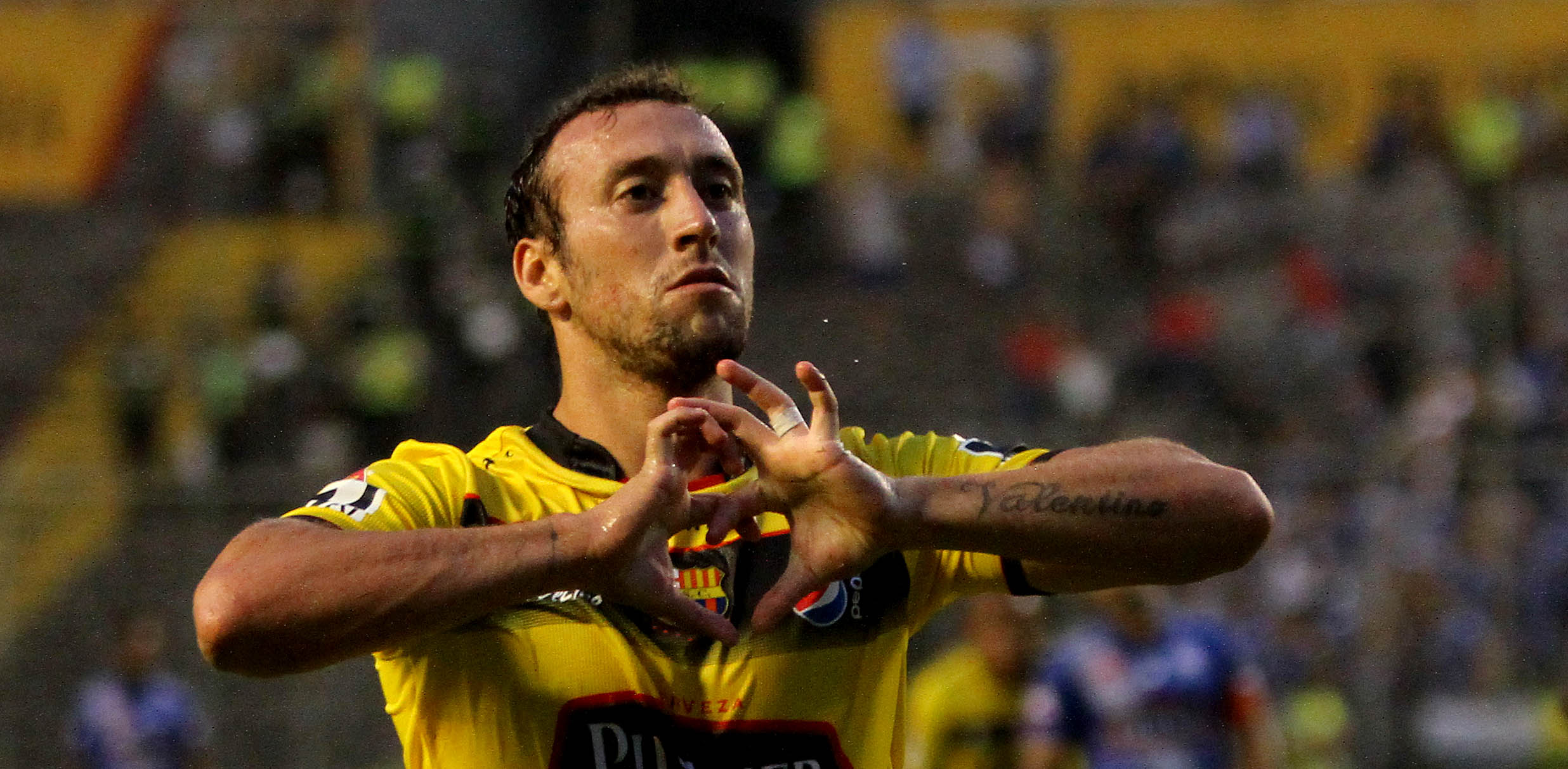
- Alemán with Barcelona SC in 2015

Personal information
- Full name: Brahian Milton Alemán Athaydes
- Date of birth: 23 December 1989 (age 36)
- Place of birth: Montevideo, Uruguay
- Height: 1.78 m (5 ft 10 in)
- Position: Attacking midfielder

Team information
- Current team: San Miguel

Youth career
- –2008: Danubio

Senior career*
Years	Team	Apps	(Gls)
2008–2012	Defensor Sporting	46	(7)
2012–2015	Unión Santa Fe	68	(8)
2014	→ Arsenal de Sarandí (loan)	19	(9)
2015	Barcelona SC	37	(10)
2016	LDU Quito	34	(4)
2017–2018	Gimnasia LP	42	(7)
2018–2019	Al-Ettifaq	25	(4)
2019–2023	Gimnasia LP	94	(16)
2023	Banfield	28	(1)
2023	→ Al-Batin (loan)	8	(0)
2024	Tigre	11	(0)
2024	Universidad de Concepción	13	(0)
2025–	San Miguel	10	(0)

International career
2012	Uruguay U23	3	(0)
- * Club domestic league appearances and goals as of 17:15, 17 August 2025 (UTC)

Brahian Milton Alemán Athaydes (born 23 December 1989) is a Uruguayan footballer who plays as an attacking midfielder for Primera Nacional club San Miguel.

== Career ==
After a spectacular 2014 season with Arsenal de Sarandí, scoring nine goals and grabbing two assists, Alemán was linked to a number of clubs. Boca Juniors, Independiente, and Barcelona Sporting Club were some of the large number of clubs interested in acquiring Aleman, with the latter ultimately landing Alemán's services for a fee of $3 million. He signed a 3-year contract.

On 14 September 2023, Alemán joined Al-Batin on loan.

In the second half of 2024, Alemán moved to Chile and joined Universidad de Concepción in the Primera B.
