= Ramón González =

Ramón González or Ramon Gonzalez may refer to:

== Politics ==
- Ramón González Valencia (1851–1928), Colombian military officer and politician
- Ramon Gonzalez, Jr. (born 1947), Republican member of the Kansas House of Representatives.
- Ramón González González (born 1962), Mexican politician

== Sports ==
- Ramón González (baseball) (1895–?), Cuban baseball player
- Ramón González (footballer, born 1898), Spanish football forward
- Ramón González (javelin thrower) (born 1966), Cuban javelin thrower
- Ramón González Arrieta (born 1967), Spanish cyclist
- Ray González, (Ramón González Rivera, born 1972), Puerto Rican professional wrestler
- Ramón González (footballer, born 1974), Spanish football manager and former centre-back

== Others ==
- Ramón González Peña (1888–1952), Basque socialist and trade union leader
