= Ali Al-Khaibari =

Saudi Arabian footballer

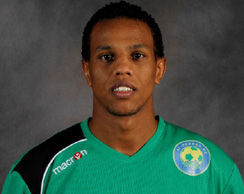
- Ali Al-Khaibari, 2014

Personal information
- Full name: Ali Nasser Al-Khaibari
- Date of birth: 25 February 1990 (age 36)
- Place of birth: Sakakah, Saudi Arabia
- Height: 1.81 m (5 ft 11 in)
- Position: Centre-back

Senior career*
Years	Team	Apps	(Gls)
2008–2014	Al-Orobah		
2014–2017	Al-Nassr	0	(0)
2015	→ Al-Sailiya (loan)	9	(0)
2015–2016	→ Najran (loan)	18	(3)
2017–2021	Al-Ettifaq	21	(0)
2021	→ Al-Ain (loan)	8	(0)
2021–2022	Al-Orobah	4	(0)
2022	Al-Qaisumah	0	(0)
2022–2023	Al-Suqoor		
2023–2024	Al-Safa		
- * Club domestic league appearances and goals as of 10:52, 31 August 2018 (UTC)

Ali Nasser Al-Khaibari (Arabic: عَلِيّ نَاصِر الْخَيْبَرِيّ; born 2 February 1990 in Sakakah) is a Saudi professional footballer who currently plays as a centre back.

== Club career ==
He started his career in Al-Orobah, before joining Al-Nassr in the summer of 2014. He spent three years with Al-Nassr and left without making any appearances. He was sent out on loan on two instances, the first time was to Qatari club Al-Sailiya on February 8, 2015. He was sent out on loan to Najran during the 2015–16 season.

On July 8, 2017, Al-Khaibari left Al-Nassr and joined Al-Ettifaq on a two-year deal. On July 1, 2019, Al-Khaibari signed a three-year contract renewal with Al-Ettifaq. On 7 February 2021, Al-Khaibari was loaned out to fellow Pro League side Al-Ain until the end of the season.

On 21 July 2022, Al-Khaibari joined Al-Qaisumah.

On 16 January 2023, Al-Khaibari was released by Al-Suqoor.

On 17 September 2023, Al-Khaibari joined Al-Safa.
