= Saad Al-Selouli =

Saudi Arabian footballer

Personal information
- Full name: Saad Ali Al-Selouli
- Date of birth: May 25, 1998 (age 28)
- Place of birth: Dammam, Saudi Arabia
- Height: 1.72 m (5 ft 8 in)
- Position: Winger

Team information
- Current team: Al-Raed

Youth career
- Al-Ettifaq

Senior career*
Years	Team	Apps	(Gls)
2017–2022	Al-Ettifaq	45	(2)
2022–2024	Abha	33	(2)
2024–2025	Al-Jabalain	27	(5)
2025–	Al-Raed	0	(0)

International career
2017–2018	Saudi Arabia U20		
2017–2021	Saudi Arabia U23		
- * Club domestic league appearances and goals as of 1 June 2023

Saad Al-Selouli (Arabic: سعد السلولى; born 25 May 1998) is a Saudi professional footballer who plays as a midfielder for Al-Raed.

== Career ==
On 5 July 2022, Al-Selouli joined Abha on a two-year deal.

On 31 August 2024, Al-Selouli joined Al-Jabalain.

On 5 September 2025, Al-Selouli joined Al-Raed.
