= Ahmed Al-Habib =

Saudi Arabian footballer (born 1993)

Personal information
- Full name: Ahmed Jamal Al-Habib
- Date of birth: 2 January 1993 (age 33)
- Place of birth: Al-Hasa, Saudi Arabia
- Height: 1.85 m (6 ft 1 in)
- Position: Defender

Team information
- Current team: Al-Shoulla
- Number: 76

Youth career
- Al-Adalah
- 2012–2014: Najran

Senior career*
Years	Team	Apps	(Gls)
2014–2015	Najran	2	(0)
2015–2017	Al-Raed	33	(1)
2017–2019	Al-Ettifaq	16	(1)
2019–2024	Abha	23	(0)
2024	Al-Orobah	6	(0)
2024–2025	Al-Batin	10	(0)
2025–	Al-Shoulla		
- * Club domestic league appearances and goals as of 18:50, 9 September 2020 (UTC)

Ahmed Al-Habib (Arabic: أحمد الحبيب; born 2 January 1993) is a Saudi professional footballer who currently plays as a defender for Al-Shoulla.

== Career ==
On 31 January 2024, Al-Habib joined Al-Orobah.

On 20 August 2024, Al-Habib joined Al-Batin.

On 29 September 2025, Al-Habib joined Al-Shoulla.
