= Saleh Al-Qumayzi =

Saudi Arabian footballer

Personal information
- Full name: Saleh Saad Al-Qumayzi
- Date of birth: October 30, 1991 (age 35)
- Place of birth: Riyadh, Saudi Arabia
- Height: 1.80 m (5 ft 11 in)
- Position: Right back

Team information
- Current team: Abha
- Number: 17

Youth career
- Al-Shabab

Senior career*
Years	Team	Apps	(Gls)
2011–2019	Al-Shabab	75	(0)
2014–2015	→ Al-Ittihad (loan)	14	(0)
2019–2021	Al-Ettifaq	54	(1)
2021–2023	Al-Faisaly	54	(1)
2023–	Abha	9	(0)
- * Club domestic league appearances and goals

Saleh Al-Qumayzi (Arabic: صالح القميزي; born 30 October 1991) is a Saudi Arabian professional footballer who plays for Abha as a right-back.

== Career ==
On 19 February 2019, Al-Qumayzi joined Al-Ettifaq on a free transfer.

On 2 June 2021, Al-Qumayzi joined Al-Faisaly on a three-year deal.

On 17 July 2023, Al-Qumayzi joined Abha on a two-year deal.

== Honours ==
Al-Shabab

- Saudi Professional League: 2011–12
- King Cup: 2014
