= Ramón Arias =

Uruguayan footballer (born 1992)

Personal information
- Full name: Ramón Ginés Arias Quinteros
- Date of birth: 27 July 1992 (age 34)
- Place of birth: Montevideo, Uruguay
- Height: 1.80 m (5 ft 11 in)
- Position: Centre back

Team information
- Current team: Tigre
- Number: 42

Senior career*
Years	Team	Apps	(Gls)
2011–2016	Defensor Sporting	112	(5)
2015–2016	→ Puebla (loan)	15	(0)
2016	LDU Quito	18	(0)
2017–2018	Peñarol	53	(2)
2018–2019	Al-Ettifaq	26	(1)
2019–2021	San Lorenzo	14	(0)
2021	Universidad de Chile	29	(3)
2022	Peñarol	14	(0)
2022–2023	Giresunspor	31	(0)
2023–2024	Muaither	11	(2)
2024	Al-Ahli	9	(0)
2024–	Tigre	31	(0)

International career^{‡}
2009	Uruguay U17	8	(0)
2011–2012	Uruguay U20	17	(1)
2012	Uruguay Olympic	3	(0)
- * Club domestic league appearances and goals as of 16:48, 3 June 2026 (UTC) ‡ National team caps and goals as of 1 August 2012

Ramón Ginés Arias Quinteros (born 27 July 1992), nicknamed Cachila, is a Uruguayan footballer who plays as a defender for Argentine club Tigre.

== Club career ==
On 12 August 2022, Arias signed with Giresunspor in Turkey.

On 10 September 2024, Arias joined Tigre in Argentina until 31 December 2025.

== International career ==
He has been capped by the Uruguay national under-17 football team for the 2009 FIFA U-17 World Cup and by the Uruguay national under-20 football team for the 2011 South American Youth Championship and for the 2011 FIFA U-20 World Cup.

=== U20 International goals ===
No.	Date	Venue	Opponent	Score	Result	Competition	Ref.
1.	7 July 2011	Estádio Brinco de Ouro da Princesa, Campinas, Brazil	Saudi Arabia	1–0	3–0	Friendly	
