= Filip Kiss =

Slovak footballer

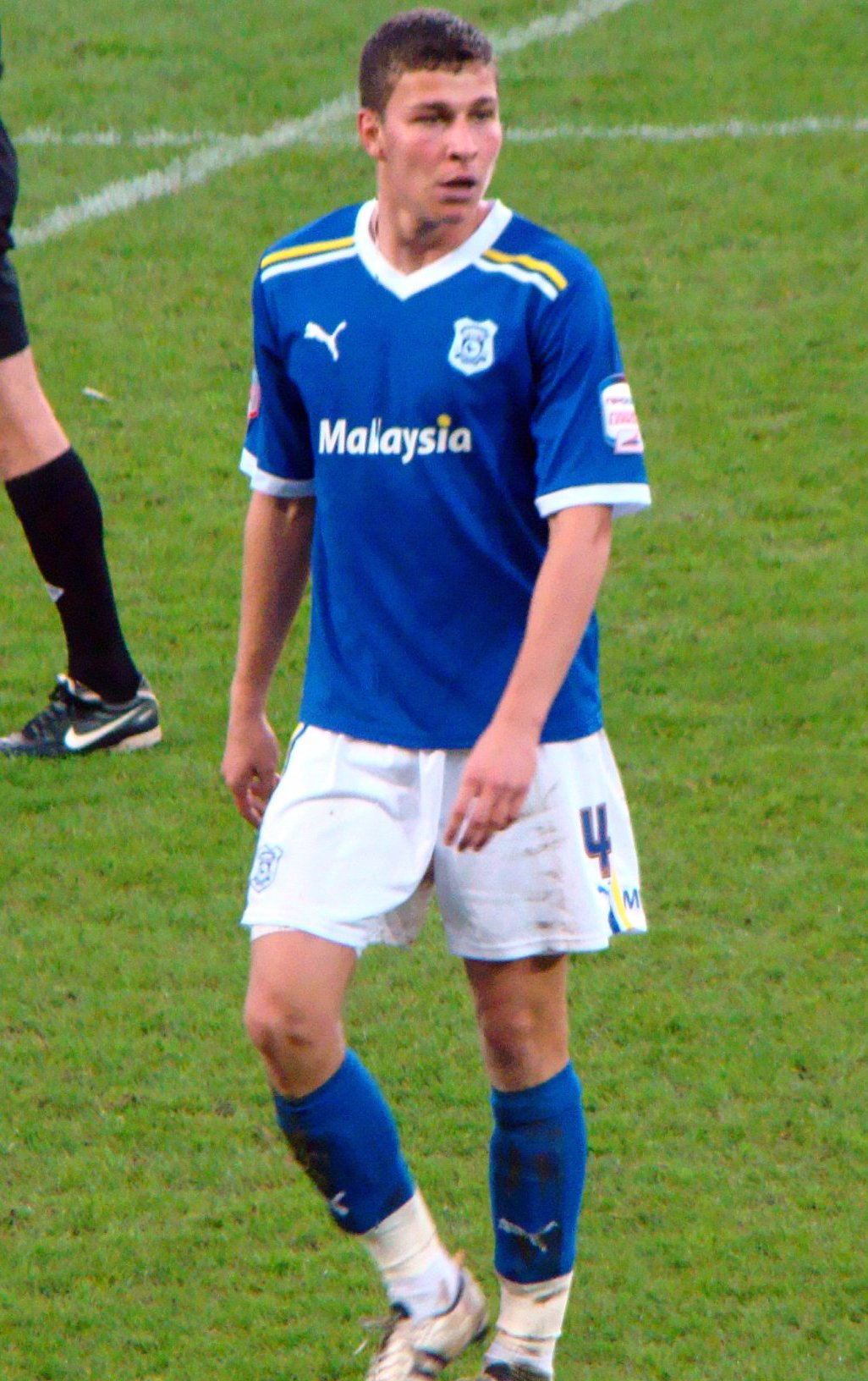
- Kiss with Cardiff City in 2011

Personal information
- Full name: Filip Kiss
- Date of birth: 13 October 1990 (age 36)
- Place of birth: Dunajská Streda, Czechoslovakia
- Height: 1.89 m (6 ft 2 in)
- Position: Midfielder

Team information
- Current team: KFC Komárno
- Number: 14

Youth career
- Inter Bratislava

Senior career*
Years	Team	Apps	(Gls)
2008–2009	Inter Bratislava		
2009–2010	Petržalka	24	(4)
2010–2012	Slovan Bratislava	30	(6)
2011–2012	→ Cardiff City (loan)	27	(1)
2012–2016	Cardiff City	2	(0)
2014	→ Ross County (loan)	17	(6)
2014–2015	→ Ross County (loan)	31	(0)
2015–2016	→ Haugesund (loan)	24	(4)
2016–2017	Haugesund	26	(4)
2017–2022	Al-Ettifaq	126	(24)
2022–2024	Al-Ittihad Kalba	48	(6)
2024–2025	Al Orooba	7	(0)
2025-	KFC Komárno	32	(3)

International career^{‡}
2008–2009	Slovakia U19	11	(2)
2010–2015	Slovakia U21	19	(1)
2014–2018	Slovakia	13	(0)
- * Club domestic league appearances and goals as of 22 September 2026 ‡ National team caps and goals as of 13 March 2021

Filip Kiss (Slovak pronunciation: [ˈfilip ˈkiʂ], Hungarian: Kiss Fülöp [ˈkiʃ ˈfyløp]; born 13 October 1990) is a Slovak professional footballer who plays as a midfielder for KFC Komárno.

== Club career ==
Kiss started his professional career at Inter Bratislava in 2008, before moving to Petržalka the following year where he made 23 league appearances. He again moved in 2010 to ŠK Slovan Bratislava.

=== Cardiff City ===
On 21 July 2011, Kiss joined Welsh club Cardiff City, who play in the Championship, on a season long loan. He made his debut for the club in a pre-season loss to Bournemouth coming as a substitute. After the game, both Kiss and Cardiff manager, Malky Mackay stated they wanted to extend the deal past the season long loan. His first start for the Bluebirds was against Yeovil Town and the following day he was given the number 4 shirt for the season. However Kiss missed the first six games of the season with a hamstring injury. On 26 August, Malky Mackay confirmed he would be part of the squad to play Portsmouth the following day Despite making the bench Kiss didn't make an appearance in the 1–1 draw. He made his debut in a 2–0 win over Doncaster Rovers, he came on as a substitute for Craig Conway. Kiss made his full debut the following game in a 1–1 draw with Blackpool. His first goal for the club came against Derby County on 2 November. Kiss was used as a substitute in the League Cup final against Liverpool, which ended in a 3–2 penalty shootout defeat. It was confirmed on 1 July that an agreement had been reached between Cardiff City and Slovan Bratislava to allow Kiss to sign for the Bluebirds on a permanent basis.

Kiss's first game as a permanent Cardiff player, came on 17 August 2012, against Huddersfield Town where he came on as a substitute for Jordon Mutch. He played 100th professional game on 5 January 2013, in the FA Cup against Macclesfield Town. Kiss's game-time for the first team was limited in 2012–13, as the Club won the Championship, though the midfielder was a regular in the club's development squad.

==== Ross County ====
On 8 January 2014, Kiss signed for Scottish Premiership side Ross County on loan until the end of the season. He made his debut on 11 January 2014, scoring twice in a 3–3 draw against Partick Thistle. He scored two more in his next game, a week later: for the second, he "picked up the ball 30 yards (27 m) away from the Dundee United goal and sent a curling ball into the top right-hand corner." Kiss returned to Cardiff at the end of his loan having scored six times in 17 appearances. On 6 August 2014, Ross County announced they had re-signed Kiss on a season-long loan.

==== FK Haugesund ====
On 19 August 2015, Kiss joined Norwegian club FK Haugesund on a season-long loan.

==== KFC Komarno ====
On 2 July 2025, it was announced that Kiss would be joining KFC Komárno, signing a two year contract.

== International career ==
Kiss has represented both Slovakia U-19 and Slovakia U-21. He had a spell as the captain of the Under-21 team. Kiss made his debut for Slovakia's senior team in a 3–1 friendly victory over Israel on 5 March 2014.

== Personal life ==
Kiss belongs to the Hungarian minority in Slovakia.

== Career statistics ==
As of match played on 9 March 2018

Appearances and goals by club, season and competition
Club	Season	League			National cup		League cup		Other		Total	
Club	Season	Division	Apps	Goals	Apps	Goals	Apps	Goals	Apps	Goals	Apps	Goals
Petržalka	2009–10	Slovak First Football League	24	4	2	0	—		—		26	4
Slovan Bratislava	2010–11	Slovak First Football League	29	6	3	0	—		4	0	36	6
Slovan Bratislava	2011–12	Slovak First Football League	1	0	0	0	—		1	0	2	0
Slovan Bratislava	Total		30	6	3	0	0	0	5	0	38	6
Cardiff City (loan)	2011–12	Championship	27	1	1	0	5	0	0	0	33	1
Cardiff City	2012–13	Championship	2	0	1	0	0	0	—		3	0
Cardiff City	2013–14	Premier League	0	0	0	0	0	0	—		0	0
Cardiff City	2014–15	Championship	0	0	0	0	0	0	—		0	0
Cardiff City	Total		2	0	1	0	0	0	0	0	3	0
Ross County (loan)	2013–14	Scottish Premiership	17	6	0	0	0	0	—		17	6
Ross County (loan)	2014–15	Scottish Premiership	31	0	0	0	2	0	—		33	0
Ross County (loan)	Total		48	6	0	0	2	0	0	0	50	6
Haugesund (loan)	2015	Tippeligaen	9	0	0	0	0	0	0	0	9	0
Haugesund	2017	Eliteserien	14	2	3	1	0	0	4	0	21	3
Al-Ettifaq	2017–18	Saudi Professional League	21	3	1	1	0	0	0	0	22	4
Career total			202	28	15	5	7	0	9	0	233	33

== Honours ==
Slovan Bratislava

- Corgoň liga: 2010–11
- Slovak Cup: 2010–11

Cardiff City

- Football League Cup runner-up: 2011–12

Slovakia

- King's Cup: 2018
