= 2022–23 Al-Taawoun FC season =

Al-Taawoun
2022–23 season
- Chairman: Saud Al-Rashoodi
- Manager: Péricles Chamusca
- Stadium: King Abdullah Sport City Stadium
- SPL: 5th
- King Cup: Round of 16 (knocked out by Abha)
- Top goalscorer: League: Léandre Tawamba (9 goals); All: Léandre Tawamba (10 goals)
- Highest home attendance: 19,478 (vs. Al-Hilal, 10 March 2023)
- Lowest home attendance: 2,767 (vs. Al-Khaleej, 6 January 2023)
- Average home league attendance: 7,310

The 2022–23 season was Al-Taawoun's 67th year in their history and 13th consecutive season in the Pro League. The club participated in the Pro League, and the King Cup.

The season covered the period from 1 July 2022 to 30 June 2023.

== Players ==
=== Squad information ===
As of 1 February 2023

Note: Flags indicate national team as defined under FIFA eligibility rules; some limited exceptions apply. Players may hold more than one non-FIFA nationality.

No.	Pos.	Nation	Player
1	GK	BRA	Mailson
2	DF	KSA	Yazeed Al-Bakr
3	FW	CMR	Léandre Tawamba
4	DF	BRA	Naldo (captain)
5	DF	KSA	Tareq Abdullah
6	DF	KSA	Mohammed Al-Ghamdi
7	MF	KSA	Fahad Al-Rashidi
8	MF	KSA	Sumayhan Al-Nabit
9	MF	KSA	Saad Al-Nasser (on loan from Al-Hilal)
10	MF	ESP	Álvaro Medrán
11	MF	MLI	Yaqoub Alhassan
12	DF	KSA	Sulaiman Hazazi
13	MF	KSA	Abdulrahman Al-Mughais
14	DF	KSA	Hassan Kadesh
15	MF	KSA	Abdulmalik Al-Oyayari
17	MF	PAR	Kaku
18	MF	NED	Aschraf El Mahdioui

No.	Pos.	Nation	Player
20	MF	KSA	Nawaf Al-Rashwodi
24	MF	BRA	Flávio Medeiros (on loan from Trabzonspor)
25	DF	KSA	Faisal Darwish
30	MF	KSA	Faisal Al-Mutairi
31	DF	KSA	Saad Balobaid
33	DF	KSA	Awn Al-Saluli
36	GK	KSA	Raghed Al-Najjar
40	DF	KSA	Hassan Rabee
44	DF	KSA	Ziyad Al-Sahafi (on loan from Al-Ittihad)
49	FW	KSA	Abdullah Radif (on loan from Al-Hilal)
50	GK	KSA	Mohammed Al-Dawsari
52	DF	KSA	Motaz Hawsawi
77	MF	KSA	Hassan Al-Omari
84	FW	KSA	Rayan Al-Johani
90	MF	KSA	Basil Al-Mehawes
91	MF	KSA	Rakan Al-Tulayhi
99	FW	KSA	Turki Al-Mutairi (on loan from Al-Hilal)

=== Out on loan ===
Note: Flags indicate national team as defined under FIFA eligibility rules; some limited exceptions apply. Players may hold more than one non-FIFA nationality.

No.	Pos.	Nation	Player
16	FW	KSA	Hussain Al-Moeini (at Al-Orobah until 30 June 2023)
27	GK	KSA	Mohammed Al-Dhulayfi (at Al-Lewaa until 30 June 2023)
66	MF	EGY	Mostafa Fathi (at Pyramids until 30 June 2023)

No.	Pos.	Nation	Player
—	DF	KSA	Abdulaziz Al-Meblesh (at Al-Saqer until 30 June 2023)
—	DF	KSA	Mubarak Motrib (at Al-Rayyan until 30 June 2023)

== Transfers and loans ==
=== Transfers in ===
Entry date	Position	No.	Player	From club	Fee	Ref.
1 July 2022	FW	16	(Saudi Arabia) Hussain Al-Maieni	(Saudi Arabia) Al-Wehda	Free	
22 July 2022	GK	1	(Brazil) Mailson	(Brazil) Sport Recife	$500,000	
22 July 2022	GK	50	(Saudi Arabia) Mohammed Al-Dossari	(Saudi Arabia) Al-Shoulla	Free	
25 July 2022	DF	4	(Brazil) Naldo	(Turkey) Antalyaspor	Free	
1 August 2022	GK	36	(Saudi Arabia) Raghid Al-Najjar	(Saudi Arabia) Al-Wehda	Undisclosed	
1 August 2022	FW	–	(Saudi Arabia) Basim Al-Oraini	(Saudi Arabia) Al-Hazem	Free	

=== Loans in ===
Start date	End date	Position	No.	Player	To club	Fee	Ref.
22 July 2022	End of season	MF	9	(Saudi Arabia) Saad Al-Nasser	(Saudi Arabia) Al-Hilal	None	
22 July 2022	End of season	MF	24	(Brazil) Flávio Medeiros	(Turkey) Trabzonspor	$200,000	
27 August 2022	End of season	FW	99	(Saudi Arabia) Turki Al-Mutairi	(Saudi Arabia) Al-Hilal	None	
31 August 2022	End of season	DF	44	(Saudi Arabia) Ziyad Al-Sahafi	(Saudi Arabia) Al-Ittihad	None	
31 August 2022	End of season	FW	49	(Saudi Arabia) Abdullah Radif	(Saudi Arabia) Al-Hilal	None	

=== Transfers out ===
Exit date	Position	No.	Player	To club	Fee	Ref.
30 June 2022	DF	28	(Democratic Republic of the Congo) Christian Luyindama	(Turkey) Galatasaray	End of loan	
30 June 2022	FW	90	(Saudi Arabia) Hazaa Al-Hazaa	(Saudi Arabia) Al-Ettifaq	End of loan	
1 July 2022	FW	29	(Cape Verde) Zé Luís		Released	
13 July 2022	GK	21	(Saudi Arabia) Moataz Al-Baqaawi	(Saudi Arabia) Al-Tai	Free	
22 July 2022	GK	1	(Brazil) Cássio		Released	
22 July 2022	MF	80	(Saudi Arabia) Ryan Al-Mousa	(Saudi Arabia) Damac	Undisclosed	
7 September 2022	FW	–	(Saudi Arabia) Meshari Al-Khalifah	(Saudi Arabia) Al-Hazem	Free	
20 September 2022	MF	–	(Saudi Arabia) Aseel Darwish	(Saudi Arabia) Al-Qawarah	Free	
21 September 2022	MF	63	(Saudi Arabia) Amjad Hawsawi	(Saudi Arabia) Qilwah	Free	
16 January 2023	DF	55	(Saudi Arabia) Nawaf Al-Sobhi	(Saudi Arabia) Al-Adalah	Undisclosed	

=== Loans out ===
Start date	End date	Position	No.	Player	To club	Fee	Ref.
12 August 2022	End of season	DF	–	(Saudi Arabia) Mubarak Motrib	(Saudi Arabia) Al-Rayyan	None	
23 August 2022	End of season	GK	27	(Saudi Arabia) Mohammed Al-Dhulayfi	(Saudi Arabia) Al-Lewaa	None	
31 August 2022	End of season	FW	16	(Saudi Arabia) Hussain Al-Maieni	(Saudi Arabia) Al-Orobah	None	
13 September 2022	End of season	DF	–	(Saudi Arabia) Abdulaziz Al-Meblesh	(Saudi Arabia) Al-Saqer	None	
16 September 2022	End of season	MF	66	(Egypt) Mostafa Fathi	(Egypt) Pyramids	None	

== Pre-season ==
5 August 2022 Friendly	Al-Taawoun (Saudi Arabia)	1–2	(United Arab Emirates) Al-Wasl	Meerlo, Netherlands
18:00 CEST	Tawamba 25'	Report

9 August 2022 Friendly	Al-Taawoun (Saudi Arabia)	0–1	(United Arab Emirates) Khor Fakkan	Netherlands
18:00 CEST		Report	Yago

12 August 2022 Friendly	Al-Taawoun (Saudi Arabia)	2–1	(United Arab Emirates) Al-Jazira	Netherlands
16:00 CEST	Balobaid 41'; Al-Oyayari 79'	Report	Traoré 72'

15 August 2022 Friendly	Al-Taawoun (Saudi Arabia)	4–1	(Belgium) Westerlo	Netherlands
16:00 CEST	Al-Nabit 4'; Al-Rashidi 13', 20'; Medrán 88'	Report

== Competitions ==
=== Overview ===
Competition	Record							
Competition	G	W	D	L	GF	GA	GD	Win %
Pro League	30	16	7	7	46	34	+12	53.33
King Cup	1	0	0	1	3	4	−1	0.00
Total	31	16	7	8	49	38	+11	51.61

Updated to match played 31 May 2023
Source: Competitions

=== Pro League ===
==== League table ====
Pos	Team	Pld	W	D	L	GF	GA	GD	Pts	Qualification or relegation
3	Al-Hilal (Note: Al-Hilal qualified for the AFC Champions League group stage as the 2022–23 King Cup winners.)	30	17	8	5	54	29	+25	59	Qualified for the AFC Champions League group stage
4	Al-Shabab	30	17	5	8	57	33	+24	56	
5	Al-Taawoun	30	16	7	7	46	34	+12	55	
6	Al-Fateh	30	13	4	13	48	43	+5	43	
7	Al-Ettifaq	30	10	7	13	28	36	−8	37	

Updated to match(es) played on 31 May 2023. Source: SPL
Rules for classification: 1) Points; 2) Head-to-head points; 3) Head-to-head goal difference; 4) Total goal difference; 5) Total goals scored; 6) Fair-play points (Note: Head-to-head record is used only after all the matches between the teams in question have been played).

==== Results summary ====
Overall								Home						Away					
Pld	W	D	L	GF	GA	GD	Pts	W	D	L	GF	GA	GD	W	D	L	GF	GA	GD
30	16	7	7	46	34	+12	55	7	4	4	22	19	+3	9	3	3	24	15	+9

Last updated: 31 May 2023.
Source: spl.com.sa

==== Results by round ====
Round	1	2	3	4	5	6	7	8	9	10	11	12	13	14	15	16	17	18	19	20	21	22	23	24	25	26	27	28	29	30
Ground	A	H	A	H	A	H	H	A	H	A	A	H	A	H	A	H	A	H	A	H	A	A	H	A	H	H	A	H	A	H
Result	W	W	D	D	W	W	L	W	W	L	W	L	W	D	W	L	L	D	W	L	D	D	D	L	W	W	W	W	W	W
Position	4	3	4	6	4	3	6	5	4	5	4	5	5	5	5	5	5	5	4	5	5	5	6	6	5	5	5	5	5	5

Updated to match(es) played on 31 May 2023. Source: spl.com.sa
A = Away; H = Home; W = Win; D = Draw; L = Loss

==== Matches ====
All times are local, AST (UTC+3).

Win Draw Loss Postponed

27 August 2022 1	Al-Fateh	0–2	Al-Taawoun	Al-Hasa
18:45	Batna (yellow card) 82'; Buhimed (yellow card) 86'; Vélez (yellow card) 90+3'	Report	Tawamba 45+3'; Al-Rashidi 57'; El Mahdioui (yellow card) 61'; Kadesh (yellow card) 78'; Al-Nabit (yellow card) 88'	Stadium: Prince Abdullah bin Jalawi Stadium; Attendance: 2,929; Referee: Khaled Al-Teris

3 September 2022 2	Al-Taawoun	1–0	Al-Nassr	Buraidah
19:00	Al-Oyayari (yellow card) 66'; Balobaid (yellow card) 85'; Tawamba (yellow card) 90+9'; Al-Nabit 90+12'	Report	Al-Amri (yellow card) 27'; Madu (yellow card) 38'; Gustavo (yellow card) 68'; Al-Hassan (yellow card) 83'	Stadium: King Abdullah Sport City Stadium; Attendance: 14,838; Referee: Kevin Ortega (Peru)

10 September 2022 3	Al-Fayha	1–1	Al-Taawoun	Al Majma'ah
18:45	Ryller (yellow card) 10'; Mandash 51'; Stojković (yellow card) 70'	Report	Kadesh 90+2'	Stadium: Al Majma'ah Sports City; Attendance: 3,184; Referee: Shukri Al-Hanfoush

16 September 2022 4	Al-Taawoun	1–1	Damac	Buraidah
18:50	Medrán (yellow card) 34'; Antolić 50' (o.g.); Al-Sahafi (yellow card) 90+3'	Report	Duarte 70', (yellow card) 76'; Al-Ammar (yellow card) 89'; Soudani (yellow card) 90+2'	Stadium: King Abdullah Sport City Stadium; Attendance: 4,532; Referee: Mohammed Al-Harbi

2 October 2022 5	Al-Hilal	1–2	Al-Taawoun	Riyadh
18:20	Michael 29'; N. Al-Dawsari (yellow card) 76'; Marega (yellow card) 90+8'	Report	Al-Nabit 45+6'; Tawamba (yellow card) 56' (yellow-red card) 65'; Al-Rashidi (yellow card) 66', (goal) 74'; Medrán (yellow card) 76'; Al-Omari (yellow card) 90+8'; Kaku (yellow card) 90+10'	Stadium: Prince Faisal bin Fahd Stadium; Attendance: 5,062; Referee: Anastasios Sidiropoulos (Greece)

6 October 2022 6	Al-Taawoun	2–0	Al-Wehda	Buraidah
18:30	Radif 45'; Al-Mutairi 88'	Report	Al-Qarni (yellow card) 14'; Bukhari (yellow card) 37'; Bakshween (yellow card) 90+2'	Stadium: King Abdullah Sport City Stadium; Attendance: 4,843; Referee: Mamdouh Al-Shahdan

11 October 2022 7	Al-Taawoun	1–3	Abha	Buraidah
18:15	Tawamba 44', (yellow card) 90+6'	Report	Sami 57', (yellow card) 81'; Caicedo 71'; Al-Selouli 90+10'	Stadium: King Abdullah Sport City Stadium; Attendance: 5,076; Referee: Sultan Al-Harbi

16 October 2022 8	Al-Ettifaq	0–1	Al-Taawoun	Dammam
20:30		Report	Al-Nasser 18'; El Mahdioui (yellow card) 60'; Kaku (yellow card) 71'; Naldo (yellow card) 89'	Stadium: Prince Mohamed bin Fahd Stadium; Attendance: 3,494; Referee: Shukri Al-Hanfoush

15 December 2022 9	Al-Taawoun	4–1	Al-Adalah	Buraidah
18:00	Medrán 5', 41'; Al-Nasser 52', (yellow card) 77'; Kaku 69'	Report	Al-Burayh (yellow card) 40'; Palacios (yellow card) 45+6'; Al-Salem (yellow card) 88'; Plata 90+4'	Stadium: King Abdullah Sport City Stadium; Attendance: 4,520; Referee: Mohammed Al-Hoaish

26 December 2022 10	Al-Ittihad	3–0	Al-Taawoun	Jeddah
18:00	Costa 38'; Hamdallah 73', 90+9' (pen.)	Report	Al-Nasser (yellow card) 45+3'; Kadesh (yellow card) 90'; Darwish (yellow card) 90+8'	Stadium: King Abdullah Sports City; Attendance: 20,297; Referee: Sven Jablonski (Germany)

31 December 2022 11	Al-Raed	2–3	Al-Taawoun	Buraidah
18:00	Tavares 45+4'; Fouzair 90+4'	Report	Kaku 5'; Medrán (yellow card) 24'; Naldo 40'; Al-Rashidi (yellow card) 56'; Tawamba 84'; Kadesh (yellow card) 90+2'; Al-Mutairi (yellow card) 90+5'	Stadium: King Abdullah Sport City Stadium; Attendance: 10,998; Referee: Majed Al-Shamrani

6 January 2023 12	Al-Taawoun	0–1	Al-Khaleej	Buraidah
18:00	Al-Saluli (yellow card) 45+2'	Report	Martins (yellow card) 27', (goal) 58'	Stadium: King Abdullah Sport City Stadium; Attendance: 2,767; Referee: Abdullah Al-Kharboush

12 January 2023 13	Al-Tai	1–3	Al-Taawoun	Ha'il
15:30	Mbenza 4'; Fai (yellow card) 45+5'	Report	Kadesh 26'; Kaku (yellow card) 28', (goal) 90+7'; Medrán 59'	Stadium: Prince Abdul Aziz bin Musa'ed Stadium; Attendance: 6,141; Referee: Mamdouh Al Shahdan

20 January 2023 14	Al-Taawoun	1–1	Al-Shabab	Buraidah
20:30	Naldo (yellow card) 27'; Medrán (yellow card) 68', (goal) 75'	Report	Al-Harbi 41'; Mina (yellow card) 63'; Al-Qahtani (yellow card) 90+5'	Stadium: King Abdullah Sport City Stadium; Attendance: 6,228; Referee: Shukri Al-Hanfoush

2 February 2023 15	Al-Batin	0–1	Al-Taawoun	Hafar al-Batin
18:00	Al-Hurayji (yellow card) 53'; Al-Yousef (yellow card) 66'; Roa (yellow card) 67'; Antônio (yellow card) 71'	Report	Abdullah (yellow card) 31'; Hazazi (red card) 45+5'; Kadesh 90+2'	Stadium: Al-Batin Club Stadium; Attendance: 3,517; Referee: Majed Al-Shamrani

9 February 2023 16	Al-Taawoun	1–2	Al-Fateh	Buraidah
18:00	Kaku 21' (pen.); Al-Nabit (yellow card) 37'	Report	Al-Daheem (yellow card) 43'; Al-Buraikan 47', 89'	Stadium: King Abdullah Sport City Stadium; Attendance: 5,595; Referee: Khaled Al-Teris

17 February 2023 17	Al-Nassr	2–1	Al-Taawoun	Riyadh
18:00	Ghareeb 17'; Madu 78'; Martínez (yellow card) 90+2'; Al-Amri (yellow card) 90+9'	Report	Medrán 47'	Stadium: Mrsool Park; Attendance: 22,347; Referee: Faisal Al-Blwi

23 February 2023 18	Al-Taawoun	1–1	Al-Fayha	Buraidah
16:00	Kadesh 90+4'	Report	Nasser (yellow card) 12'; Trajkovski 31'; Majrashi (yellow card) 90+3'; Stojković (yellow card) 90+8'; Al-Qaydhi (yellow card) 90+8'	Stadium: King Abdullah Sport City Stadium; Attendance: 4,706; Referee: Majed Al-Shamrani

4 March 2023 19	Damac	1–2	Al-Taawoun	Khamis Mushait
16:00	Soudani (yellow card) 45+9'; Hamzi 56'	Report	Al-Ghamdi (yellow card) 11'; Tawamba 27'; Abdullah (yellow card) 45+2'; Al-Rashidi 47'; Al-Nabit (yellow card) 65'; Al-Mutairi (yellow card) 90+8'	Stadium: Damac Club Stadium; Attendance: 2,795; Referee: Sultan Al-Harbi

10 March 2023 20	Al-Taawoun	0–4	Al-Hilal	Buraidah
20:30	Abdullah (yellow card) 48'	Report	Ighalo 32', 45+4'; Michael 51'; Al-Bulaihi (yellow card) 54'; Al-Qahtani 90+9'	Stadium: King Abdullah Sport City Stadium; Attendance: 19,478; Referee: Khaled Al-Teris

17 March 2023 21	Al-Wehda	1–1	Al-Taawoun	Mecca
20:30	Duarte 65'; Yoda (yellow card) 89'	Report	El Mahdioui (yellow card) 38'; Tawamba 46'; Naldo (yellow card) 90+4'	Stadium: King Abdul Aziz Stadium; Attendance: 1,369; Referee: Sami Al-Jires

5 April 2023 22	Abha	1–1	Al-Taawoun	Abha
22:00	Bguir (yellow card) 43'; Atouchi 63'; Natiq (yellow card) 90+7'	Report	Al-Nabit (yellow card) 45'; Al-Rashidi 68'; Naldo (yellow card) 79' (yellow-red card) 85'; Tawamba (yellow card) 90+7'	Stadium: Prince Sultan bin Abdul Aziz Stadium; Attendance: 627; Referee: Raed Al-Zahrani

9 April 2023 23	Al-Taawoun	1–1	Al-Ettifaq	Buraidah
22:00	Radif 79'; Medrán (yellow card) 84'; El Mahdioui (yellow card) 86'	Report	Quaison 6'; F. Al-Ghamdi (yellow card) 50'	Stadium: King Abdullah Sport City Stadium; Attendance: 4,800; Referee: Khaled Al-Teris

27 April 2023 24	Al-Adalah	2–1	Al-Taawoun	Al-Hasa
19:00	Eugénio 1'; Tijanić 40'; Godál (yellow card) 70'; Al-Harbi (yellow card) 87'; Lenis (yellow card) 90+4'	Report	Al-Nabit 51'	Stadium: Prince Abdullah bin Jalawi Stadium; Attendance: 9,828; Referee: Sultan Al-Harbi

3 May 2023 25	Al-Taawoun	2–1	Al-Ittihad	Buraidah
19:00	Al-Rashidi 17', 67'; Abdullah (yellow card) 83'; Al-Nabit (yellow card) 90+6'; Al-Najjar (yellow card) 90+10'; Al-Mutairi (red card) 90+15'	Report	Hamdallah 76'; Al-Bishi (yellow card) 90+5'; Henrique (yellow card) 90+6'	Stadium: King Abdullah Sport City Stadium; Attendance: 8,892; Referee: Bastian Dankert (Germany)

9 May 2023 26	Al-Taawoun	2–1	Al-Raed	Buraidah
19:00	Medrán (yellow card) 16', (goal) 45+1'; El Mahdioui (yellow card) 35'; Kaku 83' (pen.); Naldo (yellow card) 90+5'	Report	Fouzair (yellow card) 39'; Tavares 44'; Mitriță (yellow card) 54'; Al-Fahad (yellow card) 81'; Salem (yellow card) 81'; Al-Farhan (yellow card) 90'	Stadium: King Abdullah Sport City Stadium; Attendance: 12,907; Referee: Anastasios Sidiropoulos (Greece)

15 May 2023 27	Al-Khaleej	0–2	Al-Taawoun	Dammam
19:00	Al-Samiri (yellow card) 90+3'; Al Abbas (yellow card) 90+5'	Report	Kadesh (yellow card) 39'; Tawamba 60'; Kaku 67'	Stadium: Prince Mohamed bin Fahd Stadium; Attendance: 3,882; Referee: Abdullah Al-Shehri

22 May 2023 28	Al-Taawoun	2–1	Al-Tai	Buraidah
21:30	Medrán (yellow card) 15'; El Mahdioui (yellow card) 19'; Al-Rashidi 28'; Tawamba 72'; Al-Nabit (yellow card) 90+1'; Balobaid (yellow card) 90+5'	Report	Harzan 55'; Qassem (yellow card) 65'	Stadium: Al-Taawoun Club Stadium; Attendance: 5,193; Referee: Mohammed Al-Beredi

27 May 2023 29	Al-Shabab	0–3	Al-Taawoun	Riyadh
21:00	Guanca (red card) 60'; Abdu Jaber (yellow card) 86'	Report	Tawamba 34'; Medrán (yellow card) 45+5'; Al-Nasser 52', (yellow card) 72'; Flávio 59'	Stadium: Prince Faisal bin Fahd Stadium; Attendance: 767; Referee: Sultan Al-Harbi

31 May 2023 30	Al-Taawoun	3–1	Al-Batin	Buraidah
21:00	El Mahdioui 38' (pen.); Tawamba 58'; Kadesh 72'; Darwish (yellow card) 90' (yellow-red card) 90+3'	Report	Al-Mutairi 41'	Stadium: Al-Taawoun Club Stadium; Attendance: 5,267; Referee: Turki Al-Hashlan

=== King Cup ===
All times are local, AST (UTC+3).

21 December 2022 Round of 16	Abha	4–3 (a.e.t.)	Al-Taawoun	Abha
15:30	Sharahili (yellow card) 11'; Caicedo 16'; Al-Amri (yellow card) 51'; Bguir 90+5' (pen.); Adam 97', 105+2'; Al-Kunaydiri (yellow card) 106' (yellow-red card) 118'	Report	Naldo (yellow card) 18'; Kaku 30', 84' (pen.); Al-Ghamdi (yellow card) 68'; Al-Rashidi (yellow card) 90+1'; Abdullah (yellow card) 104'; Tawamba 107'	Stadium: Prince Sultan bin Abdul Aziz Stadium; Referee: Mohammed Al-Harbi

== Statistics ==
=== Appearances ===
Last updated on 31 May 2023.

No.	Pos	Nat	Player	Total		Pro League		King Cup	
No.	Pos	Nat	Player	Apps	Goals	Apps	Goals	Apps	Goals
Goalkeepers
1	GK	(Brazil) BRA	Mailson	29	0	28	0	1	0
36	GK	(Saudi Arabia) KSA	Raghed Al-Najjar	3	0	2+1	0	0	0
50	GK	(Saudi Arabia) KSA	Mohammed Al-Dawsari	0	0	0	0	0	0
Defenders
2	DF	(Saudi Arabia) KSA	Yazeed Al-Bakr	3	0	0+3	0	0	0
4	DF	(Brazil) BRA	Naldo	27	1	26	1	1	0
5	DF	(Saudi Arabia) KSA	Tareq Abdullah	20	0	8+11	0	0+1	0
6	DF	(Saudi Arabia) KSA	Mohammed Al-Ghamdi	21	0	12+8	0	1	0
12	DF	(Saudi Arabia) KSA	Sulaiman Hazazi	6	0	5+1	0	0	0
14	DF	(Saudi Arabia) KSA	Hassan Kadesh	30	5	29	5	1	0
25	DF	(Saudi Arabia) KSA	Faisal Darwish	6	0	0+6	0	0	0
31	DF	(Saudi Arabia) KSA	Saad Balobaid	25	0	24	0	1	0
33	DF	(Saudi Arabia) KSA	Awn Al-Saluli	13	0	10+3	0	0	0
40	DF	(Saudi Arabia) KSA	Hassan Rabee	0	0	0	0	0	0
44	DF	(Saudi Arabia) KSA	Ziyad Al-Sahafi	10	0	3+7	0	0	0
52	DF	(Saudi Arabia) KSA	Motaz Hawsawi	1	0	0+1	0	0	0
Midfielders
7	MF	(Saudi Arabia) KSA	Fahad Al-Rashidi	28	7	25+2	7	0+1	0
8	MF	(Saudi Arabia) KSA	Sumayhan Al-Nabit	27	3	15+11	3	1	0
9	MF	(Saudi Arabia) KSA	Saad Al-Nasser	23	3	13+9	3	1	0
10	MF	(Spain) ESP	Álvaro Medrán	28	6	27	6	1	0
11	MF	(Mali) MLI	Yaqoub Alhassan	3	0	0+3	0	0	0
13	MF	(Saudi Arabia) KSA	Abdulrahman Al-Mughais	1	0	0+1	0	0	0
15	MF	(Saudi Arabia) KSA	Abdulmalik Al-Oyayari	7	0	6+1	0	0	0
17	MF	(Paraguay) PAR	Kaku	27	8	20+6	6	1	2
18	MF	(Netherlands) NED	Aschraf El Mahdioui	30	1	29	1	1	0
19	MF	(Saudi Arabia) KSA	Faisal Al-Mutairi	0	0	0	0	0	0
20	MF	(Saudi Arabia) KSA	Nawaf Al-Rashwodi	1	0	0+1	0	0	0
24	MF	(Brazil) BRA	Flávio Medeiros	11	1	10+1	1	0	0
43	MF	(Saudi Arabia) KSA	Emad Al-Knian	0	0	0	0	0	0
77	MF	(Saudi Arabia) KSA	Hassan Al-Omari	23	0	6+16	0	0+1	0
90	MF	(Saudi Arabia) KSA	Basil Al-Mehawes	1	0	0+1	0	0	0
Forwards
3	FW	(Cameroon) CMR	Léandre Tawamba	30	10	29	9	1	1
49	FW	(Saudi Arabia) KSA	Abdullah Radif	16	2	3+12	2	0+1	0
70	FW	(Saudi Arabia) KSA	Rayan Al-Johani	0	0	0	0	0	0
99	FW	(Saudi Arabia) KSA	Turki Al-Mutairi	16	1	0+16	1	0	0
Player who made an appearance this season but have left the club
55	DF	(Saudi Arabia) KSA	Nawaf Al-Sobhi	1	0	0+1	0	0	0

=== Goalscorers ===
Rank	No.	Pos	Nat	Name	Pro League	King Cup	Total
1	3	FW	(Cameroon)	Léandre Tawamba	9	1	10
2	17	MF	(Paraguay)	Kaku	6	2	8
3	7	MF	(Saudi Arabia)	Fahad Al-Rashidi	7	0	7
4	10	MF	(Spain)	Álvaro Medrán	6	0	6
5	14	DF	(Saudi Arabia)	Hassan Kadesh	5	0	5
6	8	MF	(Saudi Arabia)	Sumayhan Al-Nabit	3	0	3
6	9	MF	(Saudi Arabia)	Saad Al-Nasser	3	0	3
8	49	FW	(Saudi Arabia)	Abdullah Radif	2	0	2
9	4	DF	(Brazil)	Naldo	1	0	1
9	18	MF	(Netherlands)	Aschraf El Mahdioui	1	0	1
9	24	MF	(Brazil)	Flávio Medeiros	1	0	1
9	99	FW	(Saudi Arabia)	Turki Al-Mutairi	1	0	1
Own goal					1	0	1
Total					46	3	49

Last Updated: 31 May 2023

=== Assists ===
Rank	No.	Pos	Nat	Name	Pro League	King Cup	Total
1	17	MF	(Paraguay)	Kaku	15	1	16
2	3	FW	(Cameroon)	Léandre Tawamba	4	0	4
2	9	MF	(Saudi Arabia)	Saad Al-Nasser	4	0	4
4	4	DF	(Brazil)	Naldo	2	0	2
4	6	DF	(Saudi Arabia)	Mohammed Al-Ghamdi	2	0	2
4	7	MF	(Saudi Arabia)	Fahad Al-Rashidi	2	0	2
4	18	MF	(Netherlands)	Aschraf El Mahdioui	2	0	2
8	1	GK	(Brazil)	Mailson	1	0	1
8	9	MF	(Saudi Arabia)	Saad Al-Nasser	1	0	1
8	10	MF	(Spain)	Álvaro Medrán	1	0	1
8	15	MF	(Saudi Arabia)	Abdulmalik Al-Oyayari	1	0	1
8	24	MF	(Brazil)	Flávio Medeiros	1	0	1
8	99	FW	(Saudi Arabia)	Turki Al-Mutairi	1	0	1
Total					37	1	38

Last Updated: 31 May 2023

=== Clean sheets ===
Rank	No.	Pos	Nat	Name	Pro League	King Cup	Total
1	1	GK	(Brazil)	Mailson	6	0	6
2	36	GK	(Saudi Arabia)	Raghed Al-Najjar	1	0	1
Total					7	0	7

Last Updated: 27 May 2023
