= 2021–22 Al-Taawoun FC season =

Al-Taawoun
2021–22 season
- Chairman: Saud Al-Rashoodi
- Manager: Nestor El Maestro (until 22 August); José Gomes (from 22 August until 20 March); John van den Brom (from 31 March until 7 May); Mohammed Al-Abdali (from 7 May)
- Stadium: King Abdullah Sport City Stadium
- SPL: 12th
- King Cup: Quarter-finals (knocked out by Al-Ittihad)
- AFC Champions League: Group stage
- Top goalscorer: League: Léandre Tawamba (18 goals); All: Léandre Tawamba (23 goals)
- Highest home attendance: 9,780 (vs. Al-Nassr, 21 January 2022)
- Lowest home attendance: 2,188 (vs. Al-Fayha, 26 November 2021)
- Average home league attendance: 5,213

The 2021–22 season was Al-Taawoun's 66th year in their history and 12th consecutive season in the Pro League. The club participated in the Pro League, the King Cup, and the AFC Champions League.

The season covered the period from 1 July 2021 to 30 June 2022.

== Players ==
=== Squad information ===
As of 1 February 2022

Note: Flags indicate national team as defined under FIFA eligibility rules; some limited exceptions apply. Players may hold more than one non-FIFA nationality.

No.	Pos.	Nation	Player
1	GK	BRA	Cássio
2	DF	KSA	Yazeed Al-Bakr
3	FW	CMR	Léandre Tawamba
5	DF	KSA	Tareq Abdullah
6	DF	KSA	Mohammed Al-Ghamdi
7	MF	KSA	Fahad Al-Rashidi
8	MF	KSA	Sumayhan Al-Nabit
9	MF	ESP	Álvaro Medrán
12	DF	KSA	Sulaiman Hazazi
14	DF	KSA	Hassan Kadesh
15	MF	KSA	Abdulmalik Al-Oyayari
18	MF	NED	Aschraf El Mahdioui
20	MF	KSA	Nawaf Al-Rashwodi
21	GK	KSA	Moataz Al-Baqaawi
22	MF	MLI	Yaqoub Alhassan
24	DF	KSA	Hassan Rabee
25	MF	KSA	Faisal Darwish

No.	Pos.	Nation	Player
26	GK	KSA	Abdulrahman Al-Ghamdi
27	GK	KSA	Mohammed Al-Dhulayfi
28	DF	COD	Christian Luyindama (on loan from Galatasaray)
29	FW	CPV	Zé Luís
30	MF	KSA	Faisal Al-Mutairi
31	DF	KSA	Saad Balobaid
33	DF	KSA	Awn Al-Saluli
52	DF	KSA	Motaz Hawsawi
66	MF	EGY	Mostafa Fathi
77	MF	KSA	Hassan Al-Omari
80	MF	KSA	Ryan Al-Mousa
84	FW	KSA	Rayan Al-Johani
85	DF	KSA	Nawaf Al-Sobhi
90	FW	KSA	Hazaa Al-Hazaa (on loan from Al-Ettifaq)
91	MF	KSA	Rakan Al-Tulayhi
97	FW	KSA	Khalid Al-Muntashiri
99	MF	KSA	Basil Al-Mehawes

== Transfers and loans ==
=== Transfers in ===
Entry date	Position	No.	Player	From club	Fee	Ref.
30 June 2021	MF	20	(Saudi Arabia) Nawaf Al-Rashwodi	(Saudi Arabia) Al-Arabi	End of loan	
30 June 2021	MF	30	(Saudi Arabia) Faisal Al-Mutairi	(Saudi Arabia) Al-Arabi	End of loan	
30 June 2021	MF	44	(Saudi Arabia) Saleh Al-Saeed	(Saudi Arabia) Al-Bukiryah	End of loan	
30 June 2021	FW	7	(Australia) Mitchell Duke	(Australia) Western Sydney Wanderers	End of loan	
1 July 2021	DF	6	(Saudi Arabia) Mohammed Al-Ghamdi	(Saudi Arabia) Ohod	Undisclosed	
4 July 2021	DF	2	(Saudi Arabia) Yazeed Al-Bakr	(Saudi Arabia) Al-Ahli	$1,000,000	
4 July 2021	DF	5	(Saudi Arabia) Tareq Abdullah	(Saudi Arabia) Al-Ittihad	Free	
10 July 2021	DF	12	(Saudi Arabia) Sulaiman Hazazi	(Saudi Arabia) Al-Wehda	Free	
9 August 2021	DF	33	(Saudi Arabia) Awn Al-Saluli	(Saudi Arabia) Al-Ittihad	Free	
9 August 2021	MF	77	(Saudi Arabia) Hassan Al-Omari	(Saudi Arabia) Al-Qadsiah	$1,600,000	
29 August 2021	FW	70	(Moldova) Henrique Luvannor	(Moldova) Sheriff Tiraspol	Undisclosed	
2 January 2022	MF	9	(Spain) Álvaro Medrán	(United States) Chicago Fire	Free	
11 January 2022	DF	52	(Saudi Arabia) Motaz Hawsawi	(Saudi Arabia) Al-Ahli	Free	
21 January 2022	MF	18	(Netherlands) Aschraf El Mahdioui	(Poland) Wisła Kraków	$2,750,000	
23 January 2022	MF	66	(Egypt) Mostafa Fathi	(Egypt) Zamalek	$1,000,000	
8 February 2022	FW	29	(Cape Verde) Zé Luís	(Russia) Lokomotiv Moscow	Free	

=== Loans in ===
Start date	End date	Position	No.	Player	To club	Fee	Ref.
26 January 2022	End of season	FW	90	(Saudi Arabia) Hazaa Al-Hazaa	(Saudi Arabia) Al-Ettifaq	$266,000	
30 January 2022	End of season	DF	28	(Democratic Republic of the Congo) Christian Luyindama	(Turkey) Galatasaray	None	

=== Transfers out ===
Exit date	Position	No.	Player	To club	Fee	Ref.
30 June 2021	DF	6	(Saudi Arabia) Mohammed Al-Ghamdi	(Saudi Arabia) Ohod	End of loan	
30 June 2021	DF	30	(Saudi Arabia) Abdulkareem Al-Muziel	(Saudi Arabia) Al-Nassr	End of loan	
1 July 2021	GK	23	(Saudi Arabia) Hussain Shae'an	(Saudi Arabia) Al-Shabab	Free	
1 July 2021	MF	29	(Saudi Arabia) Abdullah Al-Jouei	(Saudi Arabia) Al-Shabab	Free	
1 July 2021	MF	50	(Saudi Arabia) Mutair Al-Zahrani	(Saudi Arabia) Abha	Free	
4 July 2021	FW	27	(Senegal) Abdoulaye Sané		Released	
6 July 2021	DF	2	(Saudi Arabia) Yassin Barnawi	(Saudi Arabia) Al-Faisaly	Free	
12 July 2021	MF	44	(Saudi Arabia) Saleh Al-Saeed	(Saudi Arabia) Al-Najma	Free	
18 July 2021	GK	–	(Saudi Arabia) Osama Al-Mermesh	(Saudi Arabia) Al-Ittihad	Free	
26 July 2021	DF	13	(Saudi Arabia) Ibrahim Al-Zubaidi	(Saudi Arabia) Al-Tai	Free	
2 August 2021	FW	24	(Saudi Arabia) Mohammad Al-Sahlawi	(Qatar) Muaither	Free	
5 August 2021	FW	7	(Australia) Mitchell Duke	(Japan) Fagiano Okayama	Free	
27 August 2021	DF	16	(Saudi Arabia) Fahad Al-Hamad	(Saudi Arabia) Al-Ahli	Free	
21 December 2021	DF	88	(Saudi Arabia) Hamdan Al-Ruwaili		Released	
7 January 2022	DF	13	(Saudi Arabia) Ahmed Assiri	(Saudi Arabia) Al-Faisaly	Free	
12 January 2022	MF	55	(Brazil) Sandro Manoel	(Qatar) Al-Ahli	Free	
30 January 2022	DF	4	(Brazil) Iago Santos	(Saudi Arabia) Al-Shabab	$1,500,000	
30 January 2022	MF	11	(Saudi Arabia) Ali Al-Nemer	(Saudi Arabia) Al-Fayha	Free	
30 January 2022	MF	17	(Burundi) Cédric Amissi	(Saudi Arabia) Al-Qadsiah	Free	
30 January 2022	MF	23	(Saudi Arabia) Mohammed Abousaban	(Saudi Arabia) Al-Fayha	Free	
30 January 2022	FW	99	(Saudi Arabia) Malek Al-Abdulmenem	(Saudi Arabia) Al-Fayha	Undisclosed	
8 February 2022	FW	70	(Moldova) Henrique Luvannor		Released	

=== Loans out ===
Start date	End date	Position	No.	Player	To club	Fee	Ref.
1 July 2021	30 January 2022	FW	99	(Saudi Arabia) Malek Al-Abdulmenem	(Saudi Arabia) Al-Fayha	None	

== Competitions ==
=== Overview ===
Competition	Record							
Competition	G	W	D	L	GF	GA	GD	Win %
Pro League	30	7	13	10	43	48	−5	23.33
King Cup	2	1	0	1	4	4	+0	50.00
Champions League	7	2	2	3	14	13	+1	28.57
Total	39	10	15	14	61	65	−4	25.64

Updated to match played 27 June 2022
Source: Competitions

=== Pro League ===
==== League table ====
Pos	Team	Pld	W	D	L	GF	GA	GD	Pts	Qualification or relegation
10	Al-Fayha	30	8	11	11	21	24	−3	35 (Note: Head-to-head points: Al-Fateh 5, Abha 5, Al-Fayha 4. Head-to-head goal difference: Al-Fateh +1, Abha –1.)	Qualification for AFC Champions League group stage (Note: Al-Fayha qualified for the AFC Champions League play-off round as 2021–22 King Cup winners.)
11	Al-Ettifaq	30	8	10	12	40	47	−7	34 (Note: Head-to-head points: Al-Ettifaq 3, Al-Taawoun 3. Head-to-head goal difference: Al-Ettifaq +2, Al-Taawoun –2.)	
12	Al-Taawoun	30	7	13	10	43	48	−5	34	
13	Al-Batin	30	8	9	13	31	41	−10	33 (Note: Head-to-head points: Al-Batin 4, Al-Faisaly 1.)	
14	Al-Faisaly (R)	30	7	12	11	28	37	−9	33	Relegation to MS League

Source: spl.com
Rules for classification: 1) Points; 2) Head-to-head points; 3) Head-to-head goal difference; 4) Total goal difference; 5) Total goals scored; 6) Fair-play points (Note: Head-to-head record is used only after all the matches between the teams in question have been played).
(R) Relegated

==== Results summary ====
Overall								Home						Away					
Pld	W	D	L	GF	GA	GD	Pts	W	D	L	GF	GA	GD	W	D	L	GF	GA	GD
30	7	13	10	43	48	−5	34	4	6	5	20	22	−2	3	7	5	23	26	−3

Last updated: 27 June 2022.
Source: spl.sa

==== Results by round ====
Round	1	2	3	4	5	6	7	8	9	10	11	12	13	14	15	16	17	18	19	20	21	22	23	24	25	26	27	28	29	30
Ground	A	H	A	H	H	A	H	A	A	H	A	A	H	A	H	H	A	H	A	A	H	A	H	H	A	H	H	A	H	A
Result	D	L	L	D	L	D	L	L	D	W	W	L	D	L	W	W	L	L	D	W	D	D	D	D	D	L	W	W	D	D
Position	7	14	14	14	15	16	16	16	16	16	12	14	14	15	14	11	13	13	15	11	11	12	12	12	13	14	13	10	10	12

Updated to match(es) played on 27 June 2022. Source: spl.com.sa
A = Away; H = Home; W = Win; D = Draw; L = Loss

==== Matches ====
All times are local, AST (UTC+3).

Win Draw Loss Postponed

12 August 2021 1	Al-Hazem	3–3	Al-Taawoun	Ar Rass
20:55	Al-Harajin 40'; Strandberg (yellow card) 65'; John 69'; Al-Mousa 87' (o.g.)	Report	Al-Nabit (yellow card) 10'; Tawamba 23', 55'; Kaku 34'; Al-Sobhi (yellow card) 45+6'; Abousaban (yellow card) 66'	Stadium: Al-Hazem Club Stadium; Attendance: 531; Referee: Shukri Al-Hanfoush

20 August 2021 2	Al-Taawoun	1–2	Al-Hilal	Buraidah
20:50	Tawamba 26', (yellow card) 38'; Al-Sobhi (yellow card) 37'; Amissi (yellow card) 41'; Kaku (yellow card) 51'; Santos (yellow card) 69'; Al-Nabit (yellow card) 90+6'	Report	Al-Breik (yellow card) 45+2'; Cuéllar (yellow card) 65'; Al-Bulaihi (yellow card) 71'; Marega 81'; Hyun-soo 90+3'; Pereira (yellow card) 90+5'	Stadium: King Abdullah Sport City Stadium; Attendance: 7,404; Referee: Mohammed Al-Hoaish

26 August 2021 3	Al-Nassr	3–1	Al-Taawoun	Riyadh
20:45	Al-Amri (yellow card) 60'; Asiri (yellow card) 85'; Aboubakar 90+1'; Hamdallah 90+8' (pen.), 90+14', (yellow card) 90+10'; Al-Hassan (yellow card) 90+12'	Report	Amissi (yellow card) 18'; Al-Nabit (yellow card) 32' (yellow-red card) 77'; Kaku 88' (pen.)	Stadium: Mrsool Park; Attendance: 8,847; Referee: Andrés Matonte (Uruguay)

12 September 2021 4	Al-Taawoun	1–1	Al-Ahli	Buraidah
18:50	Tawamba 9'; Al-Mousa (yellow card) 39'	Report	Hamidou (yellow card) 29'; Paulinho 63'; Al-Khabrani (yellow card) 67'; Al-Moasher (yellow card) 90+3'	Stadium: King Abdullah Sport City Stadium; Attendance: 2,841; Referee: Faisal Al-Blwi

17 September 2021 5	Al-Taawoun	3–5	Al-Raed	Buraidah
18:45	Manoel (yellow card) 6'; Luvannor (yellow card) 14', (goal) 57'; Tawamba 52', 54'; Kadesh (yellow card) 75'	Report	Baalghyth (yellow card) 12'; El Berkaoui 28', 71', (yellow card) 29'; Al-Farhan (yellow card) 56'; R. Al-Ghamdi 64'; Al-Beshe 68'; Al-Mogren 88'; Al-Rehaili (yellow card) 89'	Stadium: King Abdullah Sport City Stadium; Attendance: 9,001; Referee: Khaled Salwi

24 September 2021 6	Al-Ittihad	1–1	Al-Taawoun	Jeddah
20:25	Al-Shamrani (yellow card) 9'; Romarinho 27' (pen.); Al-Malki (yellow card) 57'	Report	Balobaid (yellow card) 5'; Santos (yellow card) 26', (goal) 74'; Abousaban (yellow card) 31'; Al-Bakr (yellow card) 37'; Manoel (yellow card) 49'; Al-Rashidi (yellow card) 90+1'	Stadium: King Abdullah Sports City; Attendance: 34,547; Referee: Sami Al-Jires

2 October 2021 7	Al-Taawoun	1–2	Al-Tai	Buraidah
18:30	Al-Nabit 59'; Manoel (yellow card) 63'; Al-Omari (yellow card) 90+5'	Report	Al-Aqel (yellow card) 29'; Musona 66', (yellow card) 90+6'; Sayoud 74'; Marcelo (yellow card) 79'; Al-Harabi (yellow card) 87'	Stadium: King Abdullah Sport City Stadium; Attendance: 2,402; Referee: Mohammed Al-Qarni

17 October 2021 8	Al-Fateh	3–0	Al-Taawoun	Al-Hasa
17:50	Wikheim 27'; Santini 35', 45+4' (pen.), (yellow card) 67'; Saâdane (yellow card) 65'	Report	Tawamba (yellow card) 42'; Al-Nabit (yellow card) 71'	Stadium: Prince Abdullah bin Jalawi Stadium; Attendance: 3,211; Referee: Khaled Salwi

22 October 2021 9	Al-Faisaly	2–2	Al-Taawoun	Al Majma'ah
18:05	Guilherme 45' (pen.); Qassem (yellow card) 61'; Amalfitano 89'	Report	Al-Nabit 11'; Santos (yellow card) 19'; Amissi 56', (yellow card) 90'	Stadium: Al Majma'ah Sports City; Attendance: 6,208; Referee: Mohammed Al-Esmaiel

30 October 2021 10	Al-Taawoun	2–0	Abha	Buraidah
18:05	Tawamba 10', 90+4'; Al-Omari (yellow card) 78'; Al-Rashidi (yellow card) 86'; Al-Baqaawi (yellow card) 90+4'	Report	Suárez (yellow card) 29'; Al-Qaydhi (yellow card) 43'; Matić (yellow card) 78'	Stadium: King Abdullah Sport City Stadium; Attendance: 3,415; Referee: Christian Ferreyra (Uruguay)

4 November 2021 11	Al-Ettifaq	1–3	Al-Taawoun	Khobar
19:00	Sliti 23'; Al-Mowalad (yellow card) 79'; Al-Hazaa (yellow card) 83'	Report	Santos 2'; Manoel (red card) 8'; Kaku (yellow card) 43'; Al-Oyayari 66', (yellow card) 71'; Hazazi (yellow card) 78'; Al-Bakr (yellow card) 86'; Tawamba 90+3'	Stadium: Prince Saud bin Jalawi Stadium; Attendance: 6,258; Referee: Majed Al-Shamrani

21 November 2021 12	Al-Batin	3–2	Al-Taawoun	Hafar al-Batin
17:40	M. Al-Qarni (yellow card) 9'; Sami 12'; Rayhi 26'; Santos 60' (o.g.); Al-Shammari (yellow card) 69'; Campaña (yellow card) 90+4'	Report	Luvannor 43' (pen.); Al-Rashidi 66'; Santos (yellow card) 85'; Amissi (yellow card) 88'	Stadium: Al-Batin Club Stadium; Attendance: 4,087; Referee: Khamis Al-Marri (Qatar)

26 November 2021 13	Al-Taawoun	1–1	Al-Fayha	Buraidah
17:50	Luvannor 81'; Al-Nabit (yellow card) 90+4'	Report	Bamsaud (yellow card) 41'; Al-Khaibari 90+5'	Stadium: King Abdullah Sport City Stadium; Attendance: 2,188; Referee: Victor Gomes (South Africa)

27 December 2021 14	Al-Shabab	3–1	Al-Taawoun	Riyadh
17:50	Banega (yellow card) 12'; Ighalo 24'; Paulinho (yellow card) 32'; Carlos 36'; Lichnovsky (yellow card) 45+1'; Bahebri 82'	Report	Luvannor (yellow card) 12'; Santos 33'; Abdullah (yellow card) 40'; Al-Saluli (yellow card) 51'; Al-Omari (yellow card) 53'	Stadium: Prince Faisal bin Fahd Stadium; Attendance: 3,862; Referee: Ovidiu Hațegan (Romania)

1 January 2022 15	Al-Taawoun	3–0	Damac	Buraidah
15:25	Luvannor 18', 65', (yellow card) 50'; Kaku 82'	Report	Chafaï (yellow card) 31'; Al-Rio (yellow card) 57'	Stadium: King Abdullah Sport City Stadium; Attendance: 4,700; Referee: Derlis Fabián López (Paraguay)

7 January 2022 16	Al-Taawoun	2–1	Al-Hazem	Buraidah
18:05	Tawamba 29'; Santos 84'; Al-Rashidi (yellow card) 90+5'	Report	Moha 27'; Alison (yellow card) 44'; Tiago (yellow card) 50'; Abdullah S. (yellow card) 79' (yellow-red card) 90+6'	Stadium: King Abdullah Sport City Stadium; Attendance: 4,375; Referee: Sandro Schärer (Switzerland)

15 January 2022 17	Al-Hilal	3–2	Al-Taawoun	Riyadh
20:00	Kanno 29'; S. Al-Dawsari 45' (pen.); Pereira (yellow card) 45+3'; Marega 47'	Report	Tawamba 6' (pen.); Luvannor 24' (pen.), (yellow card) 71'; Medrán (yellow card) 39'	Stadium: Prince Faisal bin Fahd Stadium; Attendance: 5,211; Referee: Óscar Macías Romo (Mexico)

21 January 2022 18	Al-Taawoun	0–1	Al-Nassr	Buraidah
15:40	Al-Oyayari (yellow card) 60'; Amissi (yellow card) 83'	Report	Martínez (yellow card) 4'; Anselmo (yellow card) 52'; Al-Saluli 80' (o.g.)	Stadium: King Abdullah Sport City Stadium; Attendance: 9,780; Referee: Bráulio Machado (Brazil)

5 February 2022 19	Al-Ahli	1–1	Al-Taawoun	Jeddah
20:20	Ghareeb (yellow card) 44'; Alioski (yellow card) 68'; Al-Mogren 82'; Al-Hamad (yellow card) 89'	Report	Al-Saluli (yellow card) 26'; Al-Omari (yellow card) 36'; Tawamba 55' (pen.)	Stadium: Prince Abdullah Al-Faisal Stadium; Attendance: 9,240; Referee: Sultan Al-Harbi

12 February 2022 20	Al-Raed	0–3	Al-Taawoun	Buraidah
18:30	Fouzair (yellow card) 66'; René (yellow card) 81'	Report	Hawsawi (yellow card) 38'; Fathi 67', 84'; Tawamba 71'	Stadium: King Abdullah Sport City Stadium; Attendance: 7,551; Referee: Ilgiz Tantashev (Uzbekistan)

17 February 2022 21	Al-Taawoun	1–1	Al-Ittihad	Buraidah
18:35	Abdullah (yellow card) 37'; Balobaid (yellow card) 46'; Fathi 59'; Medrán (yellow card) 74'; Al-Omari (red card) 90+4'	Report	Hamdallah 2'; André (yellow card) 17'; Al-Sahafi (yellow card) 87'	Stadium: King Abdullah Sport City Stadium; Attendance: 7,201; Referee: Mohammed Al-Hoaish

27 February 2022 22	Al-Tai	1–1	Al-Taawoun	Ha'il
16:10	Al-Jubairi 26'; Marcelo (yellow card) 33'; Malele (yellow card) 64'	Report	Balobaid (yellow card) 29'; Medrán (yellow card) 35'; Figueroa 67' (o.g.); Hazazi (red card) 74'	Stadium: Prince Abdul Aziz bin Musa'ed Stadium; Attendance: 4,868; Referee: Fábio Veríssimo (Portugal)

4 March 2022 23	Al-Taawoun	1–1	Al-Fateh	Buraidah
18:45	Al-Sobhi (yellow card) 19' (yellow-red card) 45+4'; Fathi 27'; Al-Bakr (yellow card) 34'; Al-Nabit (yellow card) 38'; El Mahdioui (yellow card) 45'; Zé Luís (red card) 49'; Abdullah (yellow card) 85'	Report	Batna (yellow card) 29' (yellow-red card) 70'; Al-Buraikan 36'; Al-Fuhaid (yellow card) 42'; Al-Daheem (yellow card) 59'	Stadium: King Abdullah Sport City Stadium; Attendance: 6,682; Referee: Piero Maza (Chile)

10 March 2022 24	Al-Taawoun	2–2	Al-Faisaly	Buraidah
18:50	Tawamba 11' (pen.), 72'; Medrán (yellow card) 61'; El Mahdioui (yellow card) 79'; Al-Oyayari (yellow card) 90+8'	Report	Tavares 57'; Al-Saiari 90+9'	Stadium: King Abdullah Sport City Stadium; Attendance: 6,897; Referee: Matthew Conger (New Zealand)

19 March 2022 25	Abha	1–1	Al-Taawoun	Abha
18:55	Bguir 44' (pen.); Atouchi (yellow card) 60'; Al-Jumayah (yellow card) 88'	Report	Fathi 17', (yellow card) 90+1'; Al-Oyayari (yellow card) 69'; Al-Bakr (yellow card) 90+6'	Stadium: Prince Sultan bin Abdul Aziz Stadium; Attendance: 2,109; Referee: Wilmar Roldán (Colombia)

5 May 2022 26	Al-Taawoun	0–4	Al-Ettifaq	Buraidah
19:20	Luyindama (yellow card) 45+3'; Fathi (yellow card) 46'; Al-Nabit (yellow card) 87'; Al-Sobhi (yellow card) 90+1'	Report	Mahnashi (yellow card) 44'; Sliti 49', 61'; Hazazi (yellow card) 53'; Niakaté 75'; Abdellaoui (yellow card) 82'; Al-Kuwaykibi 90+2' (pen.)	Stadium: King Abdullah Sport City Stadium; Attendance: 4,053; Referee: Sergei Karasev (Russia)

12 May 2022 27	Al-Taawoun	1–0	Al-Batin	Buraidah
19:20	Tawamba 10'; El Mahdioui (yellow card) 36'; Al-Nabit (yellow card) 47'; Medrán (yellow card) 90+4'	Report	Al-Shammari (yellow card) 32'; Sami (yellow card) 79'	Stadium: King Abdullah Sport City Stadium; Attendance: 3,406; Referee: István Kovács (Romania)

29 May 2022 28	Al-Fayha	0–1	Al-Taawoun	Al Majma'ah
19:20		Report	Tawamba 19'	Stadium: Al Majma'ah Sports City; Attendance: 6,293; Referee: Sultan Al-Harbi

23 June 2022 29	Al-Taawoun	1–1	Al-Shabab	Buraidah
21:00	El Mahdioui 53'; Medrán (yellow card) 81'	Report	Bahebri 29'; Al-Abed (yellow card) 57'; Al-Qahtani (yellow card) 68'; Santos (yellow card) 90+2'	Stadium: King Abdullah Sport City Stadium; Attendance: 3,837; Referee: Majed Al-Shamrani

27 June 2022 30	Damac	1–1	Al-Taawoun	Abha
21:00	Al-Nakhli (yellow card) 5', (goal) 88'; Munshi (yellow card) 37'	Report	Balobaid (yellow card) 12'; Tawamba 53'	Stadium: Prince Sultan bin Abdul Aziz Stadium; Attendance: 791; Referee: Khaled Al-Teris

=== King Cup ===
All times are local, AST (UTC+3).

21 December 2021 Round of 16	Al-Taawoun	3–2	Al-Tai	Buraidah
18:00	Tawamba 66', 90+2'; Kaku (yellow card) 69', (goal) 82'	Report	Dener 31'; Al-Johani 53'	Stadium: King Abdullah Sport City Stadium; Referee: Sultan Al-Okairy

21 February 2022 Quarter-finals	Al-Taawoun	1–2	Al-Ittihad	Buraidah
16:00	Abdullah (yellow card) 30'; Al-Nabit 53'; El Mahdioui (yellow card) 90+6'	Report	Al-Bishi 86'; Henrique (yellow card) 90+6'; Hamdallah 90+6' (pen.); André (yellow card) 90+9'	Stadium: King Abdullah Sport City Stadium; Referee: Nikola Dabanović (Montenegro)

=== AFC Champions League ===
==== Play-off Round ====
15 March 2022 Play-off round	Al-Taawoun (Saudi Arabia)	1–1 (a.e.t.) (5–4 p)	(Syria) Al-Jaish	Buraidah, Saudi Arabia
18:50 AST	Al-Nabit 81'	Report	Hanan (yellow card) 45+1'; Ghareer (yellow card) 65'; Al Wakid 70'; Meshleb (yellow card) 91'; Al Issa (yellow card) 100'	Stadium: King Abdullah Sport City Stadium; Attendance: 12,911; Referee: Sivakorn Pu-udom (Thailand)
	Penalties
	Al-Sobhi (penalty scored); Tawamba (penalty scored); Hawsawi (penalty scored); Cássio (penalty scored); Medrán (penalty scored)		(penalty missed) Al Saleh; (penalty scored) Hamad; (penalty scored) Al Turk; (penalty scored) Meshleb; (penalty scored) Amer

==== Group stage ====
Pos	Team	Pld	W	D	L	GF	GA	GD	Pts	Qualification	DUH	TWN	SEP	PAK
1	(Qatar) Al-Duhail	6	5	0	1	17	9	+8	15	Advance to Round of 16	—	1–2	5–2	3–2
2	(Saudi Arabia) Al-Taawoun (H)	6	2	1	3	13	12	+1	7 (Note: Head-to-head points: Al-Taawoun 4, Sepahan 1.)		3–4	—	3–0	0–1
3	(Iran) Sepahan	6	2	1	3	8	12	−4	7		0–1	1–1	—	2–1
4	(Uzbekistan) Pakhtakor	6	2	0	4	10	15	−5	6		0–3	5–4	1–3	—

Source: AFC
Rules for classification: Tiebreakers
(H) Hosts
Notes:

7 April 2022 1	Al-Duhail (Qatar)	1–2	(Saudi Arabia) Al-Taawoun	Buraidah, Saudi Arabia
23:15 UTC+3	Edmilson 7'; Al-Rawi (yellow card) 68'	Report	Tawamba 11', (yellow card) 83'; Luyindama (yellow card) 36'; Medrán 86'	Stadium: King Abdullah Sport City Stadium; Attendance: 4,924; Referee: Mohanad Qasim Sarray (Iraq)

10 April 2022 2	Al-Taawoun (Saudi Arabia)	0–1	(Uzbekistan) Pakhtakor	Buraidah, Saudi Arabia
23:15 UTC+3	Al-Mousa (red card) 90+7'; Tawamba (yellow card) 90+8'	Report	Ćeran (yellow card) 44'; Erkinov 83'; Alibaev (yellow card) 88'; Azamov (yellow card) 90'	Stadium: King Abdullah Sport City Stadium; Attendance: 4,105; Referee: Hiroyuki Kimura (Japan)

14 April 2022 3	Al-Taawoun (Saudi Arabia)	3–0	(Iran) Sepahan	Buraidah, Saudi Arabia
23:15 UTC+3	Al-Rashidi (yellow card) 12'; Al-Sobhi 43'; Zé Luís 46'; Al-Bakr 77'	Report	Pourghaz (red card) 10'; Esmaeilifar (yellow card) 17'; Noorafkan (yellow card) 68'; Gvelesiani (yellow card) 76'	Stadium: King Abdullah Sport City Stadium; Attendance: 3,260; Referee: Ma Ning (China)

18 April 2022 4	Sepahan (Iran)	1–1	(Saudi Arabia) Al-Taawoun	Buraidah, Saudi Arabia
23:15 UTC+3	Salmani (yellow card) 50'; Moghanlou 65'	Report	Luyindama (yellow card) 45+2'; Al-Nabit 47'; Tawamba (yellow card) 90+1'	Stadium: King Abdullah Sport City Stadium; Attendance: 3,789; Referee: Adham Makhadmeh (Jordan)

22 April 2022 5	Al-Taawoun (Saudi Arabia)	3–4	(Qatar) Al-Duhail	Buraidah, Saudi Arabia
23:15 UTC+3	Tawamba 21', 37'; Al-Omari 25'; Zé Luís (yellow card) 30'; Al-Oyayari (yellow card) 79'; Medrán (yellow card) 82'; Al-Sobhi (yellow card) 86'	Report	Boudiaf 11'; Al-Brake (yellow card) 19'; Edmilson 58', 84' (pen.); Ali 88', (yellow card) 88'	Stadium: King Abdullah Sport City Stadium; Attendance: 4,147; Referee: Hiroyuki Kimura (Japan)

26 April 2022 6	Pakhtakor (Uzbekistan)	5–4	(Saudi Arabia) Al-Taawoun	Buraidah, Saudi Arabia
23:15 UTC+3	Fayzullayev (yellow card) 16', (goal) 22'; Hadzhiev (yellow card) 27'; Turgunboev 31'; Sobirkhuzhaev 32'; Mirahmadov 78'; Alibaev (yellow card) 82'; Sayfiev (yellow card) 82'; Ergashboev 86'; Turgunboev (yellow card) 90+3'	Report	Al-Bakr 14' Al-Omari (yellow card) 36', (goal) 83' (pen.) Al-Nabit 51', 60' Al-Sobhi (yellow card) 72'	Stadium: King Abdullah Sport City Stadium; Attendance: Ma Ning (China); Referee: 2,681

== Statistics ==
=== Appearances ===
Last updated on 27 June 2022.

No.	Pos	Nat	Player	Total		Pro League		King Cup		Champions League	
No.	Pos	Nat	Player	Apps	Goals	Apps	Goals	Apps	Goals	Apps	Goals
Goalkeepers
1	GK	(Brazil) BRA	Cássio	32	0	29	0	2	0	1	0
21	GK	(Saudi Arabia) KSA	Moataz Al-Baqaawi	7	0	1	0	0	0	6	0
27	GK	(Saudi Arabia) KSA	Mohammed Al-Dhulayfi	0	0	0	0	0	0	0	0
Defenders
2	DF	(Saudi Arabia) KSA	Yazeed Al-Bakr	27	2	12+7	0	0+1	0	7	2
5	DF	(Saudi Arabia) KSA	Tareq Abdullah	32	0	20+3	0	2	0	5+2	0
6	DF	(Saudi Arabia) KSA	Mohammed Al-Ghamdi	0	0	0	0	0	0	0	0
12	DF	(Saudi Arabia) KSA	Sulaiman Hazazi	9	0	6+2	0	0	0	0+1	0
14	DF	(Saudi Arabia) KSA	Hassan Kadesh	7	0	5+2	0	0	0	0	0
24	DF	(Saudi Arabia) KSA	Hassan Rabee	0	0	0	0	0	0	0	0
28	DF	(Democratic Republic of the Congo) COD	Christian Luyindama	17	0	10+2	0	1	0	4	0
31	DF	(Saudi Arabia) KSA	Saad Balobaid	29	0	17+4	0	2	0	6	0
33	DF	(Saudi Arabia) KSA	Awn Al-Saluli	19	0	12+5	0	1	0	1	0
52	DF	(Saudi Arabia) KSA	Motaz Hawsawi	9	0	4+1	0	0	0	2+2	0
85	DF	(Saudi Arabia) KSA	Nawaf Al-Sobhi	24	1	14+2	0	1	0	5+2	1
Midfielders
7	MF	(Saudi Arabia) KSA	Fahad Al-Rashidi	33	1	12+14	1	1+1	0	3+2	0
8	MF	(Saudi Arabia) KSA	Sumayhan Al-Nabit	36	7	20+7	2	2	1	6+1	4
9	MF	(Spain) ESP	Álvaro Medrán	19	1	14	0	1	0	4	1
15	MF	(Saudi Arabia) KSA	Abdulmalik Al-Oyayari	23	1	4+13	1	0+1	0	0+5	0
18	MF	(Netherlands) NED	Aschraf El Mahdioui	15	1	12	1	1	0	2	0
20	MF	(Saudi Arabia) KSA	Nawaf Al-Rashwodi	4	0	0+2	0	0	0	0+2	0
22	MF	(Mali) MLI	Yaqoub Alhassan	11	0	1+10	0	0	0	0	0
25	MF	(Saudi Arabia) KSA	Faisal Darwish	2	0	0+2	0	0	0	0	0
30	MF	(Saudi Arabia) KSA	Faisal Al-Mutairi	5	0	0+1	0	0	0	1+3	0
66	MF	(Egypt) EGY	Mostafa Fathi	15	5	11+1	5	1	0	2	0
77	MF	(Saudi Arabia) KSA	Hassan Al-Omari	32	2	11+12	0	1+1	0	6+1	2
80	MF	(Saudi Arabia) KSA	Ryan Al-Mousa	22	0	10+6	0	0	0	6	0
91	MF	(Saudi Arabia) KSA	Rakan Al-Tulayhi	1	0	0	0	0	0	0+1	0
99	MF	(Saudi Arabia) KSA	Basil Al-Mehawes	1	0	0	0	0	0	0+1	0
Forwards
3	FW	(Cameroon) CMR	Léandre Tawamba	38	23	29+1	18	2	2	6	3
29	FW	(Cape Verde) CPV	Zé Luís	8	1	2+3	0	0+1	0	2	1
84	FW	(Saudi Arabia) KSA	Rayan Al-Johani	0	0	0	0	0	0	0	0
90	FW	(Saudi Arabia) KSA	Hazaa Al-Hazaa	7	0	1+3	0	0	0	2+1	0
97	FW	(Saudi Arabia) KSA	Khaled Al-Muntashari	2	0	0+1	0	0	0	0+1	0
Player who made an appearance this season but have left the club
4	DF	(Brazil) BRA	Iago Santos	18	4	17	4	1	0	0	0
10	MF	(Paraguay) PAR	Kaku	16	4	12+3	3	1	1	0	0
13	DF	(Saudi Arabia) KSA	Ahmed Assiri	4	0	4	0	0	0	0	0
16	DF	(Saudi Arabia) KSA	Fahad Al-Hamad	0	0	0	0	0	0	0	0
17	MF	(Burundi) BDI	Cédric Amissi	17	1	16	1	1	0	0	0
23	MF	(Saudi Arabia) KSA	Mohammed Abousaban	9	0	2+7	0	0	0	0	0
55	MF	(Brazil) BRA	Sandro Manoel	14	0	13	0	1	0	0	0
70	FW	(Moldova) MDA	Henrique Luvannor	12	6	9+2	6	0+1	0	0	0

=== Goalscorers ===
Rank	No.	Pos	Nat	Name	Pro League	King Cup	Champions League	Total
1	3	FW	(Cameroon)	Léandre Tawamba	18	2	3	23
2	8	MF	(Saudi Arabia)	Sumayhan Al-Nabit	2	1	4	7
3	70	FW	(Moldova)	Henrique Luvannor	6	0	0	6
4	66	MF	(Egypt)	Mostafa Fathi	5	0	0	5
5	4	DF	(Brazil)	Iago Santos	4	0	0	4
5	10	MF	(Paraguay)	Kaku	3	1	0	4
7	2	DF	(Saudi Arabia)	Yazeed Al-Bakr	0	0	2	2
7	77	MF	(Saudi Arabia)	Hassan Al-Omari	0	0	2	2
9	7	MF	(Saudi Arabia)	Fahad Al-Rashidi	1	0	0	1
9	9	MF	(Spain)	Álvaro Medrán	0	0	1	1
9	15	MF	(Saudi Arabia)	Abdulmalik Al-Oyayari	1	0	0	1
9	17	MF	(Burundi)	Cédric Amissi	1	0	0	1
9	18	MF	(Netherlands)	Aschraf El Mahdioui	1	0	0	1
9	29	FW	(Cape Verde)	Zé Luís	0	0	1	1
9	85	DF	(Saudi Arabia)	Nawaf Al-Sobhi	0	0	1	1
Own goal					1	0	0	1
Total					43	4	14	61

Last Updated: 27 June 2022

=== Assists ===
Rank	No.	Pos	Nat	Name	Pro League	King Cup	Champions League	Total
1	5	DF	(Saudi Arabia)	Tareq Abdullah	2	1	2	5
1	66	MF	(Egypt)	Mostafa Fathi	2	0	3	5
3	8	MF	(Saudi Arabia)	Sumayhan Al-Nabit	3	0	1	4
3	31	DF	(Saudi Arabia)	Saad Balobaid	2	0	2	4
3	55	MF	(Brazil)	Sandro Manoel	4	0	0	4
6	2	DF	(Saudi Arabia)	Yazeed Al-Bakr	3	0	0	3
6	3	FW	(Cameroon)	Léandre Tawamba	2	0	1	3
6	9	MF	(Spain)	Álvaro Medrán	1	1	1	3
6	10	MF	(Paraguay)	Kaku	2	1	0	3
10	7	MF	(Saudi Arabia)	Fahad Al-Rashidi	2	0	0	2
11	1	GK	(Brazil)	Cássio	1	0	0	1
11	13	DF	(Saudi Arabia)	Ahmed Assiri	1	0	0	1
11	15	MF	(Saudi Arabia)	Abdulmalik Al-Oyayari	1	0	0	1
11	17	MF	(Burundi)	Cédric Amissi	1	0	0	1
11	77	MF	(Saudi Arabia)	Hassan Al-Omari	0	0	1	1
11	80	MF	(Saudi Arabia)	Ryan Al-Mousa	0	0	1	1
Total					27	3	12	42

Last Updated: 27 June 2022

=== Clean sheets ===
Rank	No.	Pos	Nat	Name	Pro League	King Cup	Champions League	Total
1	1	GK	(Brazil)	Cássio	5	0	0	5
2	21	GK	(Saudi Arabia)	Moataz Al-Baqaawi	0	0	1	1
Total					5	0	1	6

Last Updated: 29 May 2022
