= 2020–21 King's Cup (Saudi Arabia) =

2020–21 King Cup
Custodian of the Two Holy Mosques Cup

Tournament details
- Country: Saudi Arabia
- Dates: 16 December 2020 – 27 May 2021
- Teams: 16

Final positions
- Champions: Al-Faisaly (1st title)
- Runners-up: Al-Taawoun

Tournament statistics
- Matches played: 15
- Goals scored: 39 (2.6 per match)
- Top goal scorer(s): Léandre Tawamba; Júlio Tavares (4 goals each)
- All statistics correct as of 27 May 2021.

The 2020–21 King Cup, or The Custodian of the Two Holy Mosques Cup, was the 46th edition of the King Cup since its establishment in 1957. The tournament commenced on 16 December 2020 and concluded with the final on 27 May 2021.

The number of teams was reduced from 64 to 16 as a result of the COVID-19 pandemic in Saudi Arabia. The competition was limited to the 16 teams participating in the 2020–21 Saudi Professional League.

Al-Hilal are the defending champions after defeating Al-Nassr 2–1 in the final. Al-Hilal were eliminated by Al-Fateh in the round of 16.

Al-Faisaly won their first title after a 3–2 win over Al-Taawoun in the final on 27 May 2021. As winners of the competition, Al-Faisaly qualified for the 2022 AFC Champions League group stage.

== Effects of the COVID-19 pandemic ==
On 9 October 2020, the SAFF decided to extend the use of five substitutions in matches (with a sixth allowed in extra time) to the 2020–21 season, which was implemented at the end of the previous season to lessen the impact of fixture congestion caused by the COVID-19 pandemic. The use of five substitutes, based on the decision of competition organizers, had been extended by IFAB until 2021. The prize fund remained the same with the winners receiving 10 million SAR.

== Participating teams ==
A total of 16 teams participated in this season. All of which compete in the Pro League.

League	Teams
Pro League	Abha; Al-Ahli; Al-Ain; Al-Batin; Al-Ettifaq; Al-Faisaly; Al-Fateh; Al-Hilal ^{TH}; Al-Ittihad; Al-Nassr; Al-Qadsiah; Al-Raed; Al-Shabab; Al-Taawoun; Al-Wehda; Damac

== Bracket ==
Round of 16
H	Al-Wehda	0
A	Al-Ittihad	3
A	Al-Fateh	2
H	Al-Hilal	0
A	Al-Taawoun	2
H	Damac	1
A	Al-Shabab	0
H	Al-Qadsiah	1
H	Al-Nassr	2
A	Al-Raed	0
A	Al-Ain	2
H	Al-Ahli	0
A	Al-Faisaly (pen.)	0 (9)
H	Al-Ettifaq	0 (8)
A	Abha	0
H	Al-Batin	3

Quarter-finals
H	Al-Ittihad	1
A	Al-Fateh (a.e.t.)	2
H	Al-Taawoun	2
A	Al-Qadsiah	1
H	Al-Nassr	3
A	Al-Ain	0
A	Al-Faisaly	2
H	Al-Batin	1

Semi-finals
A	Al-Fateh	2
H	Al-Taawoun	3
H	Al-Nassr	0
A	Al-Faisaly	1

Final
-	Al-Taawoun	2
-	Al-Faisaly	3

Notes

- H: Home team
- A: Away team

Source: SAFF

== Round of 16 ==
The draw for the whole tournament was held on 2 November 2020. The dates for the Round of 16 fixtures were announced on 18 November 2020. All times are local, AST (UTC+3).

16 December 2020 3	Damac (1)	1–2	Al-Taawoun (1)	Abha
15:35	Fallatah (yellow card) 39'; Abdullah (yellow card) 68'; Abo Shararah (yellow card) 88'; Zelaya 90+1'	Report	Amissi 2'; Barnawi (yellow card) 13' (yellow-red card) 45'; Duke (yellow card) 64'; Kadesh (yellow card) 68'; Tawamba 76'; Abousaban (yellow card) 90'	Stadium: Prince Sultan bin Abdul Aziz Stadium; Attendance: 0 Referee: Majed Al-Shamrani

16 December 2020 4	Al-Qadsiah (1)	1–0	Al-Shabab (1)	Khobar
17:25	Bordeianu (yellow card) 67'; Al-Amri 89' (pen.), (yellow card) 90'; Al-Yami (yellow card) 90+1'	Report	Martins (yellow card) 45'; Al-Hamdan (yellow card) 80'; Al-Dubaysh (yellow card) 82'; Guanca (yellow card) 89'	Stadium: Prince Saud bin Jalawi Stadium; Attendance: 0 Referee: Sultan Al-Harbi

16 December 2020 5	Al-Nassr (1)	2–0	Al-Raed (1)	Riyadh
20:20	Yahya 21', (yellow card) 30'; Martínez (yellow card) 27'; Al-Najei 67'; Al-Ghannam (yellow card) 71'; Maicon (yellow card) 76'; Petros (yellow card) 79'	Report	Daoudi (yellow card) 77'	Stadium: King Fahd International Stadium; Attendance: 0 Referee: Raed Al-Zahrani

17 December 2020 8	Al-Batin (1)	3–0	Abha (1)	Hafar al-Batin
15:15	Chaves 9'; Sami 25'; Al-Qarni (yellow card) 47'; El Jebli (yellow card) 48'; Abreu 82'	Report	Al-Jamaan (yellow card) 8'; Al-Jumeiah (yellow card) 22'	Stadium: Al-Batin Club Stadium; Attendance: 0 Referee: Mohammed Al-Nuhait

17 December 2020 7	Al-Ettifaq (1)	0–0 (a.e.t.) (8–9 p)	Al-Faisaly (1)	Dammam
17:25	Doukara (yellow card) 10'; Hazazi (yellow card) 34'; Ghazi (yellow card) 104'	Report	Guilherme (yellow card) 78'; Silva (yellow card) 107'	Stadium: Prince Mohamed bin Fahd Stadium; Attendance: 0 Referee: Mohammed Al-Hoaish
	Penalties
	Kiss (penalty scored); Souza (penalty scored); Sliti (penalty scored); Al-Kwikbi (penalty missed); Al-Ghamdi (penalty scored); Ghazi (penalty scored); Azaro (penalty scored); Mets (penalty scored); Al-Qumaizi (penalty scored); Mahnashi (penalty missed)		(penalty scored) Tavares; (penalty scored) Guilherme; (penalty missed) Faik; (penalty scored) Al-Sharid; (penalty scored) Al-Saiari; (penalty scored) Rossi; (penalty scored) Silva; (penalty scored) Omar; (penalty scored) Qassem; (penalty scored) Al-Kassar

17 December 2020 2	Al-Hilal (1)	0–2	Al-Fateh (1)	Riyadh
17:40	Jahfali (yellow card) 1'; Cuéllar (yellow card) 90+4'	Report	Al-Habib (yellow card) 43'; Batna 55'; Saâdane (yellow card) 84'; Al-Fuhaid (yellow card) 87'; Bendebka 88'; Al-Daheem (yellow card) 90+3'	Stadium: King Fahd International Stadium; Attendance: 0 Referee: Turki Al-Khudhayr

17 December 2020 1	Al-Wehda (1)	0–3	Al-Ittihad (1)	Mecca
20:20	Al-Khulaif (yellow card) 27'; Al-Eisa (yellow card) 76'	Report	Prijović 48' (pen.), 49'; Pedrão 71' (o.g.)	Stadium: King Abdul Aziz Stadium; Attendance: 0 Referee: Khaled Al-Teris

17 December 2020 6	Al-Ahli (1)	0–2	Al-Ain (1)	Jeddah
20:20	Lima (yellow card) 32'; Fejsa (yellow card) 45+3'	Report	Getterson (yellow card) 42', (goal) 64'; Bradarić 71' (pen.)	Stadium: King Abdullah Sports City Reserve Stadium; Attendance: 0 Referee: Mohammed Al-Qarni

== Quarter-finals ==
The dates for the Quarter-finals fixtures were announced on 13 January 2021. All times are local, AST (UTC+3).

15 March 2021 12	Al-Batin (1)	1–2	Al-Faisaly (1)	Hafar al-Batin
18:45	Sami (yellow card) 4', (goal) 36'; Schenk (yellow card) 24' (yellow-red card) 90+1'; Al-Mozairib (yellow card) 60'	Report	Al-Saiari 5', 78'; Majrashi (yellow card) 32'; Al-Sharid (yellow card) 45+1'; Kaabi (yellow card) 71'	Stadium: Al-Batin Club Stadium; Attendance: 0 Referee: Faisal Al-Blwi

15 March 2021 10	Al-Taawoun (1)	2–1	Al-Qadsiah (1)	Buraidah
20:45	Tawamba 10'; Al-Zubaidi (yellow card) 16'; Al-Nabit (yellow card) 44', (goal) 58'; Amissi (yellow card) 67'; Abousaban (yellow card) 74'; Al-Ghamdi (yellow card) 90+8'	Report	Hazazi (yellow card) 3'; Al-Amri 37'; Williams (yellow card) 90+9'	Stadium: King Abdullah Sport City Stadium; Attendance: 0 Referee: Mohammed Al-Hoaish

16 March 2021 11	Al-Nassr (1)	3–0	Al-Ain (1)	Riyadh
18:40	Al-Hassan (yellow card) 38'; Hamdallah 45+4'; Amrabat 72'; Al-Najei 83'	Report	Ndiaye (yellow card) 25'; Al-Khaibari (yellow card) 35'; Bradarić (yellow card) 45+6'; Moutari (yellow card) 47'; Getterson (yellow card) 74'; Juanpi (yellow card) 74'; Muath (yellow card) 78'	Stadium: Mrsool Park; Attendance: 0 Referee: Turki Al-Khudhayr

16 March 2021 9	Al-Ittihad (1)	1–2 (a.e.t.)	Al-Fateh (1)	Mecca
20:45	Al-Malki (yellow card) 15'; Prijović (yellow card) 52'; Camara (yellow card) 65'; Abdulhamid (yellow card) 68' (yellow-red card) 75'; Hegazi 120'; Al-Muwallad (yellow card) 120+3'	Report	Bendebka (yellow card) 7' (yellow-red card) 90+2'; Al-Fuhaid (yellow card) 14'; Boushal (yellow card) 30'; Batna 113'; Majrashi 118'; Al-Zaqaan (yellow card) 119'	Stadium: King Abdul Aziz Stadium; Attendance: 0 Referee: Majed Al-Shamrani

== Semi-finals ==
The dates for the Semi-final fixtures were announced on 16 March 2021. All times are local, AST (UTC+3).

4 April 2021 13	Al-Taawoun (1)	3–2	Al-Fateh (1)	Buraidah
19:00	Assiri (yellow card) 11'; Kaku 25'; Tawamba 55'; Amissi 62'; Al-Zubaidi (yellow card) 69'; Sané (yellow card) 90'; Al-Mousa (yellow card) 90+6'	Report	Saâdane (yellow card) 42' te Vrede (yellow card) 51'; Majrashi 72'; Batna 74'; Al-Hassan (yellow card) 76'	Stadium: King Abdullah Sport City Stadium; Attendance: 0 Referee: Faisal Al-Blwi

4 April 2021 14	Al-Nassr (1)	0–1	Al-Faisaly (1)	Riyadh
21:00	Madu (yellow card) 68'; Hamdallah (yellow card) 79'; Al-Ghannam (yellow card) 85'	Report	Rossi (red card) 9'; Guilherme (yellow card) 45+4'; Tavares 81' (pen.); Al-Kassar (yellow card) 90+4'; Silva (yellow card) 90+7'	Stadium: Mrsool Park; Attendance: 0 Referee: Mohammed Al-Hoaish

== Final ==
All times are local, AST (UTC+3).

27 May 2021
21:00

Al-Taawoun	2–3	Al-Faisaly
Tawamba 14'; Kaku 45' (pen.)	Report	Tavares 40' (pen.), 60', 90+3'

King Fahd International Stadium, Riyadh
Referee: Szymon Marciniak (Poland)

== Top goalscorers ==
As of 27 May 2021

Rank	Player	Club	Goals
1	(Cameroon) Léandre Tawamba	Al-Taawoun	4
1	(Cape Verde) Júlio Tavares	Al-Faisaly	4
3	(Morocco) Mourad Batna	Al-Fateh	3
4	(Serbia) Aleksandar Prijović	Al-Ittihad	2
4	(Saudi Arabia) Zakaria Sami	Al-Batin	2
4	(Saudi Arabia) Mohammed Al-Saiari	Al-Faisaly	2
4	(Saudi Arabia) Hassan Al-Amri	Al-Qadsiah	2
4	(Saudi Arabia) Sami Al-Najei	Al-Nassr	2
4	(Burundi) Cédric Amissi	Al-Taawoun	2
4	(Saudi Arabia) Mohammed Majrashi	Al-Fateh	2
4	(Paraguay) Kaku	Al-Taawoun	2

Note: Players and teams marked in bold are still active in the competition.
