= Saad Balobaid =

Saudi Arabian footballer

Personal information
- Full name: Saad Yaslam Balobaid
- Date of birth: 27 January 2000 (age 26)
- Place of birth: Buraidah, Saudi Arabia
- Height: 1.68 m (5 ft 6 in)
- Position: Left-back

Team information
- Current team: Al-Ahli
- Number: 31

Youth career
- Al-Taawoun

Senior career*
Years	Team	Apps	(Gls)
2020–2023	Al-Taawoun	52	(0)
2023–	Al-Ahli	56	(1)
2025–2026	→ Al-Shabab (loan)	31	(1)

International career
2022	Saudi Arabia U23		
- * Club domestic league appearances and goals as of 20 November 2026

Saad Balobaid (Arabic: سعد بالعبيد; born 27 January 2000) is a Saudi Arabian professional footballer who plays as a left-back for Saudi Professional League side Al-Ahli.

== Club career ==
Balobaid started his career at the youth team of Al-Taawoun. He made his first-team debut on 24 October 2020 in the AFC Champions League group stage match against Qatari side Al-Duhail. He came off the bench in the 38th minute following an injury to Hamdan Al-Ruwaili. On 23 October 2020, Balobaid signed his first professional contract with the club. On 6 November 2020, Balobaid made his Pro League in the 1–1 draw against Al-Ittihad. He made 3 further appearances during the 2020–21 season. On 17 September 2021, Balobaid made his first appearance of the 2021–22 season in the 5–3 derby defeat to Al-Raed. He made 21 appearances and assisted twice during the course of the 2021–22 season as Al-Taawoun managed to finish 12th and avoid relegation. On 30 April 2022, Balobaid renewed his contract with Al-Taawoun for another three years.

On 7 September 2023, Balobaid joined Al-Ahli on a five-year deal. On 10 September 2025, Balobaid joined Al-Shabab on loan.

== International career ==
On 21 January 2022, Balobaid was called up to the Saudi Arabia U23 national team for the first time. He made his debut on 30 January 2022 in the 2–1 win against Qatar. On 31 May 2022, Balobaid was called up to replace Muhannad Al-Shanqeeti who withdrew from the 2022 AFC U-23 Asian Cup due to injury. He made one appearance in the tournament as the Green Falcons won their first AFC U-23 Asian Cup title.

== Career statistics ==
=== Club ===
As of match played 27 May 2025

Club	Season	League			King Cup		Asia		Other		Total	
Club	Season	Division	Apps	Goals	Apps	Goals	Apps	Goals	Apps	Goals	Apps	Goals
Al-Taawoun	2019–20	SPL	0	0	0	0	1	0	—		1	0
Al-Taawoun	2020–21	SPL	4	0	0	0	—		—		4	0
Al-Taawoun	2021–22	SPL	21	0	2	0	6	0	—		29	0
Al-Taawoun	2022–23	SPL	24	0	1	0	—		—		25	0
Al-Taawoun	2023–24	SPL	3	0	0	0	—		—		3	0
Al-Taawoun	Total		52	0	3	0	7	0	0	0	62	0
Al-Ahli	2023–24	SPL	23	0	1	0	—		—		24	0
Al-Ahli	2024–25	SPL	22	1	0	0	7	0	0	0	29	1
Al-Ahli	2025–26	SPL	1	0	0	0	0	0	1 (Note: Appearances in Saudi Super Cup)	0	2	0
Al-Ahli	Total		46	1	1	0	7	0	1	0	55	1
Al-Shabab (loan)	2025–26	SPL	0	0	0	0	—		0	0	0	0
Career totals			98	1	5	0	14	0	1	0	116	1

== Honours ==
Al-Ahli

- Saudi Super Cup: 2025
- AFC Champions League Elite: 2024–25

Saudi Arabia U23

- AFC U-23 Asian Cup: 2022
