= Léandre Tawamba =

Cameroonian footballer

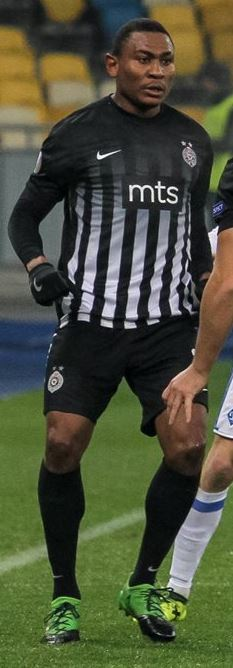
- Tawamba with Partizan in 2017

Personal information
- Full name: Léandre Gaël Tawamba Kana
- Date of birth: 20 December 1989 (age 36)
- Place of birth: Yaoundé, Cameroon
- Height: 1.89 m (6 ft 2 in)
- Position: Forward

Youth career
- Eding
- Jeunesse Star

Senior career*
Years	Team	Apps	(Gls)
2007–2008	Aigle Royal Menoua		
2009–2010	Union Douala		
2011	Aigle Royal Menoua		
2012	FC Cape Town		
2012	Mpumalanga Black Aces		
2013	Nitra	14	(3)
2013–2014	Ružomberok	31	(13)
2014	Al-Ahly Benghazi	0	(0)
2015–2016	Zlaté Moravce	19	(11)
2016	Kairat	23	(4)
2016–2018	Partizan	48	(14)
2018–2023	Al-Taawoun	135	(65)
2023–2024	Al-Okhdood	29	(5)
2024–2025	Al-Tai	13	(5)

International career^{‡}
2018–	Cameroon	8	(0)
- * Club domestic league appearances and goals as of 14 January 2025 ‡ National team caps and goals as of 5 March 2022

Léandre Gaël Tawamba Kana (born 20 December 1989) is a Cameroonian professional footballer who plays as a forward.

Early in his career, Tawamba played as a centre-back and defensive midfielder, but was converted into a striker in Europe.

== Club career ==
=== Early career ===
Born in Yaoundé, Tawamba was a regular member of Cameroon's Elite One side Aigle Royal Menoua in the 2007–08 season. He later moved to Union Douala, spending there the 2009–10 campaign. In 2011, Tawamba returned to his former club Aigle Royal Menoua, captaining the team in the nation's Elite Two.

=== South Africa and Slovakia ===
In early 2012, Tawamba moved abroad to South Africa and joined FC Cape Town. He scored once in the second half of the 2011–12 National First Division. In June 2012, Tawamba traveled to Slovakia and trained with Slovan Bratislava and Ružomberok, before returning to South Africa and joining National First Division side Mpumalanga Black Aces. He was ultimately transferred to Slovak club Nitra in early 2013. Until the end of the 2012–13 season, Tawamba scored three times in 14 league appearances.

In June 2013, Tawamba switched to Ružomberok, rejoining his Nitra manager Jozef Vukušič. He netted on his league debut on 14 July, scoring the equalizer in a 2–2 draw with Žilina. On 10 August, Tawamba scored a brace in a 3–2 home win over Spartak Trnava. He finished the season as the team's top scorer with 13 goals in 31 appearances.

=== Libya ===
In July 2014, Tawamba returned to Africa and signed with Libyan club Al-Ahly Benghazi, again following his former manager Jozef Vukušič. He represented the side in the 2014 CAF Champions League exclusively, appearing in two games of the group stage against Tunisia's CS Sfaxien and Espérance.

=== Return to Slovakia ===
In early 2015, Tawamba returned to Slovakia and joined Zlaté Moravce, but was unable to play in the 2014–15 season. He scored a goal on his debut for the club on 15 August in a 2–2 home draw with Železiarne Podbrezová. On 19 September, Tawamba netted both his team's goals in a 5–2 away loss to Ružomberok. He subsequently scored a hat-trick to give his side a 3–1 win over Skalica on 21 November.

=== Kazakhstan ===
On 1 April 2016, Tawamba transferred to Kazakh club Kairat. He signed a one-plus-two-year contract and was awarded the number 20 shirt. On 29 May, Tawamba scored a stoppage-time back-heel winner to give his team a 3–2 win over Akzhayik. He subsequently made his debut in UEFA competitions, coming on as a substitute for Gerard Gohou in a 1–0 away win against Teuta Durrës in the first leg of the 2016–17 UEFA Europa League first qualifying round on 30 June. A week later in the return leg, Tawamba scored his team's fourth goal in an eventual 5–0 victory at home. He also netted a brace in a 3–2 away win against Irtysh Pavlodar on 17 July. One day before the league's final fixture, on 28 October, Tawamba terminated his contract with Kairat by mutual agreement. He made 29 appearances and scored six goals in all competitions.

=== Serbia ===
In November 2016, Tawamba moved to Serbia and signed a three-year contract with Partizan. He scored his first goal for the club in a 3–0 home league win over Metalac Gornji Milanovac on 8 March 2017. In his first Belgrade derby, Tawamba scored the team's second goal in an eventual 3–1 away win over Red Star Belgrade on 18 April. He eventually finished the season collecting the double.

On 22 July 2017, Tawamba scored a brace in the league's opener versus Mačva Šabac, as Partizan won the game 6–1. He also netted the opening goal in a 1–3 loss to Olympiacos in the first leg of the 2017–18 UEFA Champions League third qualifying round on 25 July. In the return leg of the 2017–18 UEFA Europa League play-off round, Tawamba scored the opener in a 4–0 away win against Videoton on 24 August, thus helping Partizan progress to the group stage. He subsequently found the back of the net in a 2–3 home loss to Dynamo Kyiv in Group B on 28 September. In the fourth game of the group stage, on 2 November, Tawamba scored a goal to give his team a 2–0 home win over Skënderbeu Korçë. He also scored the opener in a 2–1 home win over Young Boys, on 23 November, as Partizan advanced to the knockout stage after 13 years. With 19 goals in 51 appearances across all competitions, Tawamba finished the season as the team's top scorer, helping them win the 2017–18 Serbian Cup.

=== Saudi Arabia ===
In July 2018, Tawamba was transferred to Saudi club Al-Taawoun for a fee of €1.4 million. He was the team's top scorer in the 2018–19 season with 27 goals across all competitions.

On 31 August 2023, Tawamba joined Al-Okhdood on a free transfer.

On 28 August 2024, Tawamba joined Al-Tai on a free transfer.

== International career ==
Tawamba was named in Cameroon's preliminary squad for the 2009 FIFA U-20 World Cup, but was later dropped from the final 21-man squad. He was also called up to the Cameroon U23 team in preparation for the 2011 All-Africa Games.

In March 2018, Tawamba received his first call-up to the Cameroon national team for a friendly against Kuwait. He played the full 90 minutes in that match, receiving a yellow card in their 3–1 away victory.

== Career statistics ==
=== Club ===
As of match played 14 January 2025

Appearances and goals by club, season and competition
Club	Season	League			National cup (Note: Includes Slovak Cup, Serbian Cup, Kazakhstan Cup, King's Cup)		Continental		Other		Total	
Club	Season	Division	Apps	Goals	Apps	Goals	Apps	Goals	Apps	Goals	Apps	Goals
Nitra	2012–13	Slovak First Football League	14	3	0	0	—		—		14	3
Ružomberok	2013–14	Slovak First Football League	31	13	4	0	—		—		35	13
Al-Ahly Benghazi	2014	Libyan Premier League	—		—		2 (Note: Appearances in CAF Champions League)	0	—		2	0
Zlaté Moravce	2015–16	Slovak First Football League	19	11	3	2	—		—		22	13
Kairat	2016	Kazakhstan Premier League	23	4	2	1	4 (Note: Appearances in UEFA Europa League)	1	—		29	6
Partizan	2016–17	Serbian Superliga	16	2	3	0	0	0	—		19	2
Partizan	2017–18	Serbian Superliga	32	12	6	1	13 (Note: Three appearances and one goal in UEFA Champions League, ten appearances and five goals in UEFA Europa League)	6	—		51	19
Partizan	Total		48	14	9	1	13	6	—		70	21
Al-Taawoun	2018–19	Saudi Pro League	28	21	6	6	—		—		34	27
Al-Taawoun	2019–20	Saudi Pro League	17	3	2	0	1 (Note: Appearances in AFC Champions League)	0	1 (Note: Appearance in Saudi Super Cup)	1	21	4
Al-Taawoun	2020–21	Saudi Pro League	27	13	3	3	1	0	—		31	16
Al-Taawoun	2021–22	Saudi Pro League	30	18	2	2	6	3	—		38	23
Al-Taawoun	2022–23	Saudi Pro League	29	9	1	1	—		—		30	10
Al-Taawoun	2023–24	Saudi Pro League	4	1	0	0	—		—		4	1
Al-Taawoun	Total		135	65	14	12	8	3	1	1	158	81
Al-Okhdood	2023–24	Saudi Pro League	29	5	1	0	—		—		30	5
Al-Tai	2024–25	Saudi First Division League	13	5	2	1	—		—		15	6
Career total			312	120	35	17	27	10	1	1	375	148

=== International ===
As of 21 March 2022

Appearances and goals by national team and year
National team	Year	Apps	Goals
Cameroon	2018	2	0
Cameroon	2021	2	0
Cameroon	2022	4	0
Total		8	0

== Honours ==
Partizan

- Serbian SuperLiga: 2016–17
- Serbian Cup: 2016–17, 2017–18

Al-Taawoun

- King's Cup: 2019

Individual

- Saudi Pro League Player of the Month: November 2018, January 2021
- King's Cup Top goalscorer: 2020–21
