= Tareq Abdullah =

Saudi Arabian footballer

Personal information
- Full name: Tareq Abdullah Mohammed
- Date of birth: 6 September 1995 (age 31)
- Place of birth: Jeddah, Saudi Arabia
- Height: 1.66 m (5 ft 5 1/2 in)
- Positions: Right-back; defensive midfielder

Youth career
- Al-Ittihad

Senior career*
Years	Team	Apps	(Gls)
2017–2021	Al-Ittihad	27	(0)
2020–2021	→ Damac (loan)	23	(0)
2021–2023	Al-Taawoun	42	(0)
2023–2024	Al-Tai	20	(1)
2024–2026	Damac	43	(0)

International career
2015–2016	Saudi Arabia U23		
- * Club domestic league appearances and goals as of 8 December 2023

Tareq Abdullah (Arabic: طارق عبدالله; born 6 September 1995) is a Saudi Arabian professional footballer who plays as a right-back or defensive midfielder.

== Club career ==
Tareq Abdullah began his career at Al-Ittihad and was promoted to the first team during the 2016–17 season. He made his league debut for the club on 7 April 2017, starting in the 1–1 draw against Al-Nassr. On 5 February 2018, Abdullah signed his first professional contract with the club. On 4 October 2018, Abdullah was substituted off the pitch after getting injured in the league match against Al-Fateh. Later, it was announced that he had injured his ACL and would undergo surgery. Abdullah made his return on 24 November 2019 in the 2–1 win against Al-Ettifaq. On 15 October 2020, Abdullah joined Damac on loan. On 4 July 2021, Abdullah joined Al-Taawoun on a free transfer. On 18 July 2023, Abdullah joined Al-Tai on a one-year deal. On 1 September 2024, Abdullah rejoined Damac on a one-year contract.

== Career statistics ==
=== Club ===
As of match played 27 May 2024

Club	Season	League			King Cup		Asia		Other		Total	
Club	Season	Division	Apps	Goals	Apps	Goals	Apps	Goals	Apps	Goals	Apps	Goals
Al-Ittihad	2016–17	Pro League	1	0	0	0	—		0	0	1	0
Al-Ittihad	2017–18	Pro League	21	0	3	0	—		—		24	0
Al-Ittihad	2018–19	Pro League	2	0	0	0	0	0	1 (Note: Appearances in Arab Club Champions Cup)	0	3	0
Al-Ittihad	2019–20	Pro League	3	0	1	0	—		1	0	5	0
Al-Ittihad	Total		27	0	4	0	0	0	2	0	33	0
Damac (loan)	2020–21	Pro League	23	0	1	0	—		—		24	0
Al-Taawoun	2021–22	Pro League	23	0	2	0	7	0	—		32	0
Al-Taawoun	2022–23	Pro League	19	0	1	0	—		—		20	0
Al-Taawoun	Total		42	0	3	0	7	0	0	0	52	0
Al-Tai	2023–24	Pro League	20	1	1	0	—		—		21	1
Career totals			112	1	9	0	7	0	2	0	130	1

== Honours ==
Al-Ittihad

- King Cup: 2018
- Crown Prince Cup: 2016–17
