= Álvaro Medrán =

Spanish footballer (born 1994)

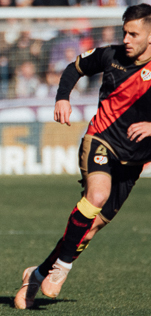
- Medrán with Rayo Vallecano in 2019

Personal information
- Full name: Álvaro Medrán Just
- Date of birth: 15 March 1994 (age 32)
- Place of birth: Dos Torres, Spain
- Height: 1.76 m (5 ft 9 in)
- Position: Midfielder

Team information
- Current team: Al-Ettifaq
- Number: 10

Youth career
- 2004–2005: Don Bosco
- 2005–2008: Córdoba
- 2008–2011: Séneca
- 2011–2013: Real Madrid

Senior career*
Years	Team	Apps	(Gls)
2012–2014	Real Madrid C	47	(13)
2014–2015	Real Madrid B	34	(8)
2014–2016	Real Madrid	2	(0)
2015–2016	→ Getafe (loan)	20	(2)
2016–2019	Valencia	17	(2)
2017–2018	→ Alavés (loan)	17	(2)
2018–2019	→ Rayo Vallecano (loan)	21	(3)
2019–2021	Chicago Fire	55	(5)
2022–2024	Al-Taawoun	58	(7)
2024–	Al-Ettifaq	80	(5)

International career
2013	Spain U19	3	(0)
2014	Spain U21	1	(0)
- * Club domestic league appearances and goals as of 19:53, 11 September 2026 (UTC)

Álvaro Medrán Just (Spanish pronunciation: [ˈalβaɾo meˈðɾaŋ ˈxust]; born 15 March 1994) is a Spanish professional footballer who plays for Saudi Pro League club Al-Ettifaq as a midfielder.

He began his career with Real Madrid, going through the club's academy and later playing five matches with the first team; he was also loaned to Getafe before being released. He signed for Valencia in July 2016, serving loans at Alavés and Rayo Vallecano.

Medrán represented Spain at youth level.

== Club career ==
=== Real Madrid ===
Born in Dos Torres, Province of Córdoba, Medrán joined Real Madrid's youth setup in 2011, aged 17. After being promoted to the C team the following year he played his first match as a senior on 23 February 2014, coming on as a second-half substitute in a 2–0 away win against Real Zaragoza for the reserves in the Segunda División. He scored his first professional goals on 31 May, netting a brace in a 2–1 home victory over CE Sabadell FC.

Medrán made his first-team – and La Liga – debut on 18 October 2014, replacing Luka Modrić in the 79th minute of a 5–0 away rout of Levante UD. On 9 December, in his UEFA Champions League maiden appearance, he scored his first senior goal for the club after replacing Gareth Bale in the 83rd minute, closing the 4–0 defeat of PFC Ludogorets Razgrad in the group stage five minutes later. Later that month, he was part of the squad that won the FIFA Club World Cup in Morocco, but did not take to the field.

On 2 July 2015, Medrán was loaned to Getafe CF in a season-long deal. He scored his first goal in the Spanish top flight on 24 April 2016, his team's first in a 2–2 home draw against Valencia CF. He added another on 15 May, but in a 2–1 loss at Real Betis which ensured top-tier relegation after a 12-year stay.

=== Valencia ===
On 11 July 2016, Medrán signed a four-year deal with Valencia. On 1 September of the following year, he was loaned to Deportivo Alavés for one season.

Medrán scored his first goal for the latter club on 30 September 2017, helping the visitors to defeat Levante 2–0. After the appointment of new manager Abelardo Fernández in December, however, he was rarely played, which led to the player bursting into tears in a post-match interview following a league fixture at UD Las Palmas in April 2018 where he featured 16 minutes and netted once (4–0).

On 11 August 2018, Medrán was loaned to fellow top-division club Rayo Vallecano for the campaign.

=== Chicago Fire ===
On 10 October 2019, Medrán was announced as a new signing by Major League Soccer side Chicago Fire FC ahead of the upcoming season. He made his debut the following 1 March, playing the full 90 minutes of a 2–1 loss at Seattle Sounders FC.

Medrán left Soldier Field in November 2021.

=== Saudi Arabia ===
On 28 December 2021, Medrán joined Al Taawoun FC of the Saudi Pro League. In January 2024, he agreed to a three-and-a-half-year contract at Al-Ettifaq FC in the same country and league.

== International career ==
Medrán won his only cap for the Spanish under-21s on 12 November 2014, playing the second half of the 1–4 friendly loss to Belgium in Ferrol.

== Career statistics ==
As of match played 30 December 2023

Appearances and goals by club, season and competition
Club	Season	League			National cup (Note: Includes Copa del Rey, King Cup)		Continental		Total	
Club	Season	Division	Apps	Goals	Apps	Goals	Apps	Goals	Apps	Goals
Real Madrid C	2012–13	Segunda División B	18	3	—		—		18	3
Real Madrid C	2013–14	Segunda División B	29	10	—		—		29	10
Real Madrid C	Total		47	13	0	0	0	0	47	13
Real Madrid B	2013–14	Segunda División	9	2	—		—		9	2
Real Madrid B	2014–15	Segunda División B	25	6	—		—		25	6
Real Madrid B	Total		34	8	0	0	0	0	34	8
Real Madrid	2014–15	La Liga	2	0	2	0	1 (Note: Appearance in UEFA Champions League)	1	5	1
Getafe (loan)	2015–16	La Liga	20	2	0	0	—		20	2
Valencia	2016–17	La Liga	16	2	4	1	—		20	3
Valencia	2017–18	La Liga	1	0	—		—		1	0
Valencia	Total		17	2	4	1	0	0	21	3
Alavés (loan)	2017–18	La Liga	17	2	4	0	—		21	2
Rayo Vallecano (loan)	2018–19	La Liga	21	3	1	0	—		22	3
Chicago Fire	2020	Major League Soccer	23	2	—		—		23	2
Chicago Fire	2021	Major League Soccer	32	3	—		—		32	3
Chicago Fire	Total		55	5	—		—		55	5
Al-Taawoun	2021–22	Saudi Pro League	14	0	1	0	4 (Note: Appearances in AFC Champions League)	1	19	1
Al-Taawoun	2022–23	Saudi Pro League	27	6	1	0	—		28	6
Al-Taawoun	2023–24	Saudi Pro League	17	1	2	1	—		19	2
Al-Taawoun	Total		58	7	4	1	4	1	66	9
Career total			271	42	15	2	5	2	291	46

== Honours ==
Real Madrid

- FIFA Club World Cup: 2014
