= Sulaiman Hazazi =

Saudi Arabian footballer

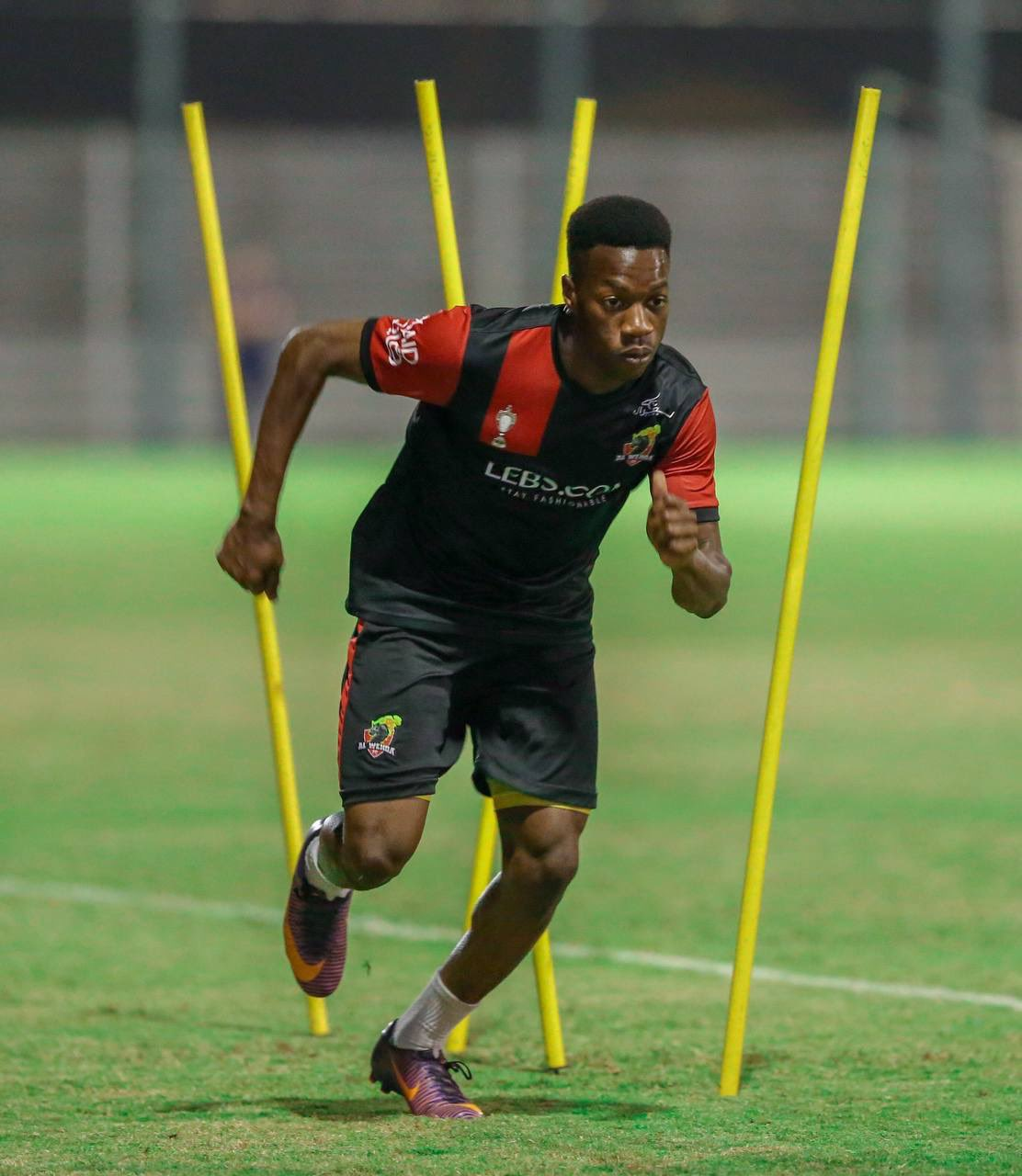
- Hazazi in 2021

Personal information
- Full name: Sulaiman Yahya Hazazi
- Date of birth: 1 February 2003 (age 23)
- Place of birth: Mecca, Saudi Arabia
- Height: 1.75 m (5 ft 9 in)
- Position: Left-back

Team information
- Current team: Al-Riyadh
- Number: 12

Youth career
- –2021: Al-Wehda

Senior career*
Years	Team	Apps	(Gls)
2021	Al-Wehda	9	(0)
2021–2024	Al-Taawoun	14	(0)
2023–2024	→ Al-Qaisumah (loan)	22	(0)
2024–2025	Al-Zulfi	29	(0)
2025–	Al-Riyadh	0	(0)

International career^{‡}
2020–2023	Saudi Arabia U20		
2021–	Saudi Arabia	2	(0)
- * Club domestic league appearances and goals ‡ National team caps and goals as of 31 May 2023

Sulaiman Yahya Hazazi (Arabic: سليمان يحيى هزازي; born 1 February 2003) is a Saudi Arabian professional footballer who plays as a left-back for Al-Riyadh.

== Career ==
Hazazi started his career at the youth team of Al-Wehda and represented the club at every level. He made his debut on 12 February 2021 in the 4–2 win against Al-Faisaly. Following Al-Wehda's relegation, Hazazi left the club. On 10 July 2021, Hazazi signed a three-year contract with Al-Taawoun. On 15 September 2023, Hazazi joined First Division side Al-Qaisumah on loan. On 3 August 2024, Hazazi joined Al-Zulfi. On 20 June 2025, Hazazi joined Al-Riyadh.

== Career statistics ==
=== Club ===
As of 28 May 2024

Appearances and goals by club, season and competition
Club	Season	League			King Cup		Asia		Other		Total	
Club	Season	Division	Apps	Goals	Apps	Goals	Apps	Goals	Apps	Goals	Apps	Goals
Al-Wehda	2020–21	SPL	9	0	0	0	1	0	—		10	0
Al-Taawoun	2021–22	SPL	8	0	0	0	1	0	—		9	0
Al-Taawoun	2022–23	SPL	6	0	0	0	—		—		6	0
Al-Taawoun	Total		14	0	0	0	1	0	0	0	15	0
Al-Qaisumah (loan)	2023–24	FDL	22	0	—		—		—		22	0
Career total			45	0	0	0	2	0	0	0	47	0

== Honours ==
Saudi Arabia U20

- Arab Cup U-20: 2021
