= Awn Al-Saluli =

Saudi Arabian footballer

Awn Al-Saluli عون السلولي
Personal information
- Full name: Awn Mutlaq Al-Saluli Al-Bishi
- Date of birth: September 2, 1998 (age 28)
- Place of birth: Bisha, Saudi Arabia
- Height: 1.92 m (6 ft 4 in)
- Position: Defender

Team information
- Current team: Neom (on loan from Al-Taawoun)
- Number: 93

Youth career
- –2017: Al-Ittihad

Senior career*
Years	Team	Apps	(Gls)
2017–2021	Al-Ittihad	6	(0)
2019–2020	→ Al-Fayha (loan)	1	(0)
2021	→ Al-Nahda (loan)	12	(2)
2021–	Al-Taawoun	68	(0)
2025–	→ Neom (loan)	0	(0)

International career^{‡}
2013–2015	Saudi Arabia U17		
2016–2018	Saudi Arabia U20		
2018–2021	Saudi Arabia U23		
2023–	Saudi Arabia	10	(0)
- * Club domestic league appearances and goals as of 7 December 2024 ‡ National team caps and goals as of 28 December 2024

Awn Al-Saluli (Arabic: عون السلولي, born 2 September 1998) is a Saudi Arabian professional footballer who plays as a defender for Neom on loan from Al-Taawoun and the Saudi Arabia national team.

== Career ==
Al-Saluli started his career at the youth team of Al-Ittihad. On 5 July 2017, Al-Saluli signed his first professional contract with the club.

On 9 December 2017, he made his first-team debut against Al-Raed replacing Ahmed Akaïchi in the 90th minute. He made his first start for the club on 25 October 2018 in a 3–1 loss against Al-Hilal.

On 2 August 2019, Al-Saluli joined Al-Fayha on a one-year loan. In February 2021, he was loaned out to Al-Nahda. On 9 August 2021, Al-Saluli joined Al-Taawoun on a three-year contract.

On 15 March 2022, Al-Saluli ruptured his anterior cruciate ligament during the AFC Champions League match against Syrian side Al-Jaish. He was ruled out for 9 months . On 31 January 2024, Al-Saluli renewed his contract with Al-Taawoun. On 9 September 2025, Al-Saluli joined Neom on loan.

== Career statistics ==
=== Club ===
As of 30 May 2025

Club	Season	League		King Cup		Asia		Other		Total	
Club	Season	Apps	Goals	Apps	Goals	Apps	Goals	Apps	Goals	Apps	Goals
Al-Ittihad	2017–18	1	0	0	0	—		—		1	0
Al-Ittihad	2018–19	5	0	0	0	0	0	1 (Note: Appearances in Arab Club Champions Cup)	0	6	0
Al-Ittihad	Total	6	0	0	0	0	0	1	0	7	0
Al-Fayha (loan)	2019–20	1	0	1	1	—		—		2	1
Al-Nahda (loan)	2020–21	12	2	—		—		—		12	2
Al-Taawoun	2021–22	16	0	1	0	1	0	—		18	0
Al-Taawoun	2022–23	13	0	0	0	—		—		13	0
Al-Taawoun	2023–24	26	0	3	0	—		—		29	0
Al-Taawoun	2024–25	13	0	3	0	6	0	—		22	0
Al-Taawoun	Total	68	0	7	0	7	0	0	0	82	0
Neom (loan)	2025–26	0	0	0	0	—		—		0	0
Career totals		87	2	8	1	7	0	1	0	103	3

== Honours ==
Al-Ittihad

- King Cup: 2018
