= Fahad Al-Rashidi (footballer, born 1997) =

Saudi Arabian footballer

Personal information
- Full name: Fahad Ayedh Al-Rashidi
- Date of birth: 16 April 1997 (age 29)
- Place of birth: Al-Kharj, Saudi Arabia
- Height: 1.75 m (5 ft 9 in)
- Position: Winger

Team information
- Current team: Al-Taawoun
- Number: 97

Youth career
- –2015: Al-Selmiyah
- 2015–2017: Al-Hilal

Senior career*
| Years | Team | Apps | (Gls) |
| 2017–2019 | Al-Hilal | 4 | (0) |
| 2019 | → Ohod (loan) | 3 | (0) |
| 2019–2023 | Al-Taawoun | 72 | (8) |
| 2023–2026 | Al-Ahli | 56 | (0) |
| 2026– | Al-Taawoun | 0 | (0) |

International career^{‡}
| 2017–2018 | Saudi Arabia U-23 | 2 | (0) |
| 2023– | Saudi Arabia | 1 | (0) |
- * Club domestic league appearances and goals as of 8 November 2025 ‡ National team caps and goals as of 28 March 2023

Fahad Al-Rashidi (Arabic: فهد الرشيدي; born 16 April 1997) is a Saudi Arabian professional footballer who plays as a winger for the Saudi Arabia national team and for the Saudi Pro League side Al-Taawoun.

== Club career ==
Al-Rashidi started his career at the youth team of Al-Selmiyah before joining the youth team of Al-Hilal on 2 July 2015. He was promoted to the first team during the 2017–18 season and made his first-team debut 27 July 2017 against Iraqi side Naft Al-Wasat in the 2017 Arab Club Championship group stage match. On 30 January 2018, Al-Rashidi made his league debut for Al-Hilal against Al-Raed. On 19 January 2019, Al-Rashidi joined Ohod on a six-month loan. On 17 August 2019, Al-Rashidi joined Al-Taawoun on a free transfer. On 1 January 2023, Al-Rashidi signed a pre-contract agreement with Al-Ahli. He officially joined the club following the conclusion of the 2022–23 season. On 30 January 2026, Al-Rashidi joined Al-Taawoun.

== Career statistics ==
=== Club ===
As of match played 27 May 2024

| Club | Season | League | | | King Cup | | Asia | | Other | | Total | |
| Club | Season | Division | Apps | Goals | Apps | Goals | Apps | Goals | Apps | Goals | Apps | Goals |
|---|---|---|---|---|---|---|---|---|---|---|---|---|
| Al-Hilal | 2017–18 | Pro League | 3 | 0 | 0 | 0 | 2 | 0 | 2 (Note: Appearances in Arab Club Champions Cup) | 1 | 7 | 1 |
| Al-Hilal | 2018–19 | Pro League | 1 | 0 | 0 | 0 | 0 | 0 | 0 | 0 | 1 | 0 |
| Al-Hilal | Total | | 4 | 0 | 0 | 0 | 2 | 0 | 2 | 1 | 8 | 1 |
| Ohod (loan) | 2018–19 | Pro League | 3 | 0 | 0 | 0 | — | | — | | 3 | 0 |
| Al-Taawoun | 2019–20 | Pro League | 12 | 0 | 2 | 0 | 6 | 0 | 1 (Note: Appearances in Saudi Super Cup) | 0 | 21 | 0 |
| Al-Taawoun | 2020–21 | Pro League | 7 | 0 | 0 | 0 | — | | — | | 7 | 0 |
| Al-Taawoun | 2021–22 | Pro League | 26 | 1 | 2 | 0 | 5 | 0 | — | | 33 | 1 |
| Al-Taawoun | 2022–23 | Pro League | 27 | 7 | 1 | 0 | — | | — | | 28 | 7 |
| Al-Taawoun | Total | | 72 | 8 | 5 | 0 | 11 | 0 | 1 | 0 | 89 | 8 |
| Al-Ahli | 2023–24 | Pro League | 31 | 0 | 2 | 0 | — | | — | | 33 | 0 |
| Career totals | | | 110 | 8 | 7 | 0 | 13 | 0 | 3 | 1 | 133 | 9 |

== Honours ==
Al-Hilal

- Saudi Pro League: 2017–18

Al-Ahli

- Saudi Super Cup: 2025
- AFC Champions League Elite: 2024–25
