= Hassan Al-Omari =

Saudi Arabian footballer

Personal information
- Full name: Hassan Mohammed Hassan Al-Omari
- Date of birth: 21 April 1994 (age 32)
- Place of birth: Dhahran, Saudi Arabia
- Height: 1.68 m (5 ft 6 in)
- Position: Winger

Team information
- Current team: Al-Tai
- Number: 7

Youth career
- –2014: Al-Qadsiah
- 2014: Al-Ettifaq

Senior career*
Years	Team	Apps	(Gls)
2014–2021	Al-Qadsiah	123	(21)
2021–2023	Al-Taawoun	46	(0)
2023–	Al-Tai	0	(0)

International career
2015–2017	Saudi Arabia U23		
- * Club domestic league appearances and goals as of 16 May 2023

Hassan Mohammed Hassan Al-Omari (Arabic: حسن محمد حسم العمري; born 21 April 1994) is a Saudi Arabian footballer who plays as a winger for Saudi Pro League club Al-Tai.

== Career ==
=== Youth ===
Al-Omari started his career at Al-Qadsiah but left in 2014. On 14 January 2014, he joined derby rivals Al-Ettifaq on a three-year amateur contract. On 28 August 2014, Al-Omari returned to Al-Qadsiah, signing a five-year professional contract with the club.

=== Al-Qadsiah ===
Al-Omari made his first-team debut for Al-Qadsiah on 17 October 2014, by coming off the bench in the league match against Al-Wehda. He made his first start on 23 February 2015 in the King Cup match against Al-Khaleej. On 17 October 2015, Al-Omari scored his first goal for the club in the 3–1 defeat to Al-Ittihad. On 27 August 2018, Al-Omari renewed his contract with the club for a further four years. He helped the club achieve promotion to the Pro League during the 2019–20 season making 31 league appearances and scoring 5 goals.

On 17 October 2020, he started the 2020–21 season by scoring in the 2–1 defeat to Al-Wehda. He then scored in the 2–2 home draw against Al-Batin. He then scored twice in the 2–1 win against Al-Ain, followed by a late winner in the King Cup match against Al-Shabab. On 27 December 2020, he scored in the 2–1 derby loss against his former club Al-Ettifaq. On 2 January 2021, Al-Omari assisted Danilo Asprilla's stoppage-time equalizer in the 2–2 draw against Al-Raed. He followed this by scoring twice in the next two games against Al-Ahli and Al-Faisaly. He then assisted Khalifah Al-Dawsari's opener in the 1–1 draw against Al-Fateh. Al-Omari good form continued with him scoring four times and assisting twice in his next four games. On 23 February 2021, Al-Omari assisted Stanley Ohawuchi's opener in the eventual 2–2 draw against Al-Batin.

=== Al-Taawoun ===
Following Al-Qadsiah's relegation, Al-Omari joined Al-Taawoun on a three-year contract on 8 August 2021.

=== Al-Tai ===
On 12 September 2023, Al-Omari joined Al-Tai following his release from Al-Taawoun.

== Career statistics ==
=== Club ===
As of match played 27 May 2024

Club	Season	League			King Cup		Asia		Other		Total	
Club	Season	Division	Apps	Goals	Apps	Goals	Apps	Goals	Apps	Goals	Apps	Goals
Al-Qadsiah	2014–15	First Division	1	0	1	0	—		0	0	2	0
Al-Qadsiah	2015–16	Pro League	21	1	1	0	—		3 (Note: Appearances in Crown Prince Cup)	0	25	1
Al-Qadsiah	2016–17	Pro League	21	2	2	0	—		2	1	25	3
Al-Qadsiah	2017–18	Pro League	14	0	0	0	—		—		14	0
Al-Qadsiah	2018–19	Pro League	8	1	1	0	—		—		9	1
Al-Qadsiah	2019–20	MS League	31	5	1	0	—		—		32	5
Al-Qadsiah	2020–21	Pro League	27	12	2	2	—		—		29	14
Al-Qadsiah	Total		123	21	8	2	0	0	5	1	136	24
Al-Taawoun	2021–22	Pro League	23	0	2	0	7	2	—		32	2
Al-Taawoun	2022–23	Pro League	22	0	1	0	—		—		23	0
Al-Taawoun	2023–24	Pro League	1	0	0	0	—		—		1	0
Al-Taawoun	Total		46	0	3	0	7	2	0	0	56	2
Al-Tai	2023–24	Pro League	4	0	0	0	—		—		4	0
Career totals			173	21	11	2	7	2	5	1	196	26

== Honours ==
Al-Qadsiah

- MS League/First Division: 2014–15, runner-up 2019–20
