= Yazeed Al-Bakr =

Saudi Arabian footballer (born 1995)

Yazeed Al-Bakr يزيد البكر
Personal information
- Full name: Yazeed Bakr Abdullah Al-Bakr
- Date of birth: 11 November 1995 (age 31)
- Place of birth: Al Zulfi, Saudi Arabia
- Height: 1.63 m (5 ft 4 in)
- Position: Right-back

Youth career
- 2010–2015: Al-Zulfi

Senior career*
Years	Team	Apps	(Gls)
2013–2017	Al-Zulfi		
2017–2019	Al-Faisaly	24	(1)
2019–2021	Al-Ahli	13	(0)
2021–2023	Al-Taawoun	22	(0)
2023–2024	Al-Hazem	15	(0)
2024–2025	Al-Riyadh	2	(0)
2025–2026	Al-Zulfi	18	(0)

International career^{‡}
2019–	Saudi Arabia	1	(0)
- * Club domestic league appearances and goals as of 27 April 2023 ‡ National team caps and goals as of 25 March 2019

Yazeed Al-Bakr (Arabic: يزيد البكر; born 11 November 1995) is a Saudi Arabian professional footballer who plays as a right-back.

== Career ==
Al-Bakr is an academy graduate of Al-Zulfi. He started his career at Al-Zulfi and spent multiple seasons at club and making appearances in the Second Division and the Third Division. On 5 December 2017, he joined Pro League side Al-Faisaly. On 31 January 2019, he signed his first professional club contract with the club. On 27 June 2019, Al-Bakr joined Al-Ahli on a four-year contract. On 4 July 2021, Al-Bakr joined Al-Taawoun on a three-year contract. On 3 August 2023, Al-Bakr joined Al-Hazem on a one-year deal. On 29 July 2024, Al-Bakr joined Al-Riyadh. On 3 August 2025, Al-Bakr joined Al-Zulfi.

== Career statistics ==
=== Club ===
As of match played 27 June 2025

Club	Season	League		King Cup		Asia		Other		Total	
Club	Season	Apps	Goals	Apps	Goals	Apps	Goals	Apps	Goals	Apps	Goals
Al-Faisaly	2018–19	24	1	2	0	—		1 (Note: Appearances in Arab Club Champions Cup)	0	27	1
Al-Ahli	2019–20	5	0	1	0	1	0	—		7	0
Al-Ahli	2020–21	8	0	0	0	0	0	—		8	0
Al-Ahli	Total	13	0	1	0	1	0	0	0	15	0
Al-Taawoun	2021–22	19	0	1	0	7	2	—		27	2
Al-Taawoun	2022–23	3	0	0	0	—		—		3	0
Al-Taawoun	Total	22	0	1	0	7	2	0	0	30	2
Al-Hazem	2023–24	15	0	1	0	—		—		16	0
Al-Riyadh	2024–25	2	0	0	0	—		—		2	0
Al-Zulfi	2025–26	0	0	0	0	—		—		2	0
Career total		76	1	5	0	8	2	1	0	90	3

=== International ===
Statistics accurate as of match played 21 January 2019.

Saudi Arabia
Year	Apps	Goals
2019	1	0
Total	1	0
