= Hassan Kadesh =

Saudi Arabian footballer

Personal information
- Full name: Hassan Kadesh Mahboob
- Date of birth: 26 September 1992 (age 34)
- Place of birth: Dammam, Saudi Arabia
- Height: 1.79 m (5 ft 10 in)
- Positions: Left-back; centre-back

Team information
- Current team: Al-Ittihad
- Number: 15

Senior career*
Years	Team	Apps	(Gls)
2012–2017	Al-Ettifaq	128	(3)
2017–2020	Al-Hilal	21	(0)
2020–2023	Al-Taawoun	74	(5)
2023–	Al-Ittihad	89	(4)

International career^{‡}
2017–	Saudi Arabia	23	(3)
- * Club domestic league appearances and goals as of 11 September 2026 ‡ National team caps and goals as of 26 September 2026

Hassan Kadesh Mahboob (Arabic: حسن حسن كادش مَحْبُوب, born 26 September 1992) is a Saudi Arabian professional footballer who plays as a defender for Saudi Pro League club Al-Ittihad and the Saudi Arabia national team.

== Club career ==
Kadesh began his career at Al-Ettifaq. He captained the side from 2015 until his departure in 2017. On 3 July 2017, Kadesh joined Al-Hilal on a four-year contract for a reported fee of SAR6 million. On 21 January 2020, Kadesh joined Al-Taawoun on a three-and-a-half-year contract. On 27 January 2023, Kadesh renewed his contract with Al-Taawoun. On 31 August 2023, Kadesh joined Al-Ittihad on a three-year deal for an undisclosed fee reported to be SAR60 million, becoming the most expensive Saudi player in history.

== International career ==
He captained the Saudi Arabia national Under-21 team for two years and then joined the Saudi Arabia Olympic Team.

On 31 May 2026, he was named in the 26-man squad for the 2026 FIFA World Cup.

== Career statistics ==
=== Club ===
As of match played 10 September 2024

Club	Season	League			King Cup		Crown Prince Cup		Asia		Other		Total	
Club	Season	Division	Apps	Goals	Apps	Goals	Apps	Goals	Apps	Goals	Apps	Goals	Apps	Goals
Al-Ettifaq	2012–13	SPL	20	0	0	0	1	0	10 (Note: Appearances in AFC Champions League)	0	—		31	0
Al-Ettifaq	2013–14	SPL	24	1	5	0	1	0	—		—		30	1
Al-Ettifaq	2014–15	SFDL	30	0	1	0	3	0	—		—		34	0
Al-Ettifaq	2015–16	SFDL	29	2	1	0	3	0	—		—		33	2
Al-Ettifaq	2016–17	SPL	25	0	3	0	1	0	—		—		29	0
Al-Ettifaq	Total		128	3	10	0	9	0	10	0	—		157	3
Al-Hilal	2017–18	SPL	3	0	0	0	0	0	0	0	0	0	3	0
Al-Hilal	2018–19	SPL	12	0	5	0	—		2	0	4 (Note: Three appearances in Arab Club Champions Cup, and one appearance in Saudi Super Cup)	0	23	0
Al-Hilal	2019–20	SPL	6	0	2	0	—		0	0	0	0	8	0
Al-Hilal	Total		21	0	7	0	—		2	0	4	0	34	0
Al-Taawoun	2019–20	SPL	9	0	0	0	—		5	0	0	0	14	0
Al-Taawoun	2020–21	SPL	25	0	4	0	—		—		—		29	0
Al-Taawoun	2021–22	SPL	7	0	0	0	—		0	0	—		7	0
Al-Taawoun	2022–23	SPL	29	5	1	0	—		—		—		30	5
Al-Taawoun	2023–24	SPL	4	0	0	0	—		—		—		4	0
Al-Taawoun	Total		74	5	5	0	—		5	0	—		84	5
Al-Ittihad	2023–24	SPL	24	1	4	0	—		6	0	4 (Note: Two appearances in FIFA Club World Cup, and two appearances in Saudi Super Cup)	0	38	1
Al-Ittihad	2024–25	SPL	2	0	0	0	—		—		—		2	0
Al-Ittihad	Total		26	1	4	0	—		6	0	4	0	40	1
Career total			249	9	26	0	9	0	23	0	8	0	315	9

=== International goals ===
No.	Date	Venue	Opponent	Score	Result	Competition
1.	10 September 2024	Dalian Suoyuwan Football Stadium, Dalian, China	China	1–1	2–1	2026 FIFA World Cup qualification
2.	10 September 2024	Dalian Suoyuwan Football Stadium, Dalian, China	China	2–1	2–1	2026 FIFA World Cup qualification
3.	26 September 2026	King Abdullah Sports City Stadium, Jeddah, Saudi Arabia	Oman	2–0	3–0	27th Arabian Gulf Cup

== Honours ==
Al-Ettifaq

- First Division: 2015–16

Al-Hilal

- Saudi Professional League: 2017–18
- Saudi Super Cup: 2018
- AFC Champions League: 2019

Al-Ittihad

- Saudi Pro League: 2024–25
- King's Cup: 2024–25
