= Sumayhan Al-Nabit =

Saudi Arabian association football player

Sumayhan Al-Nabit سميحان النابت
Personal information
- Full name: Sumayhan Dhaidan Al-Nabit Al-Baqaawi
- Date of birth: 27 March 1996 (age 30)
- Place of birth: Baqaa, Saudi Arabia
- Height: 1.65 m (5 ft 5 in)
- Positions: Winger; forward

Team information
- Current team: Al-Ula
- Number: 88

Youth career
- –2011: Al-Lewaa
- 2011–2017: Al-Ahli

Senior career*
| Years | Team | Apps | (Gls) |
| 2017–2019 | Ohod | 7 | (0) |
| 2019–2020 | Abha | 32 | (4) |
| 2020–2023 | Al-Taawoun | 87 | (9) |
| 2023–2025 | Al-Ahli | 46 | (5) |
| 2025– | Al-Ula | 0 | (0) |

International career^{‡}
| 2023– | Saudi Arabia | 3 | (1) |
- * Club domestic league appearances and goals as of 26 May 2025 ‡ National team caps and goals as of 12 January 2023

Sumayhan Al-Nabit (Arabic: سميحان النابت; born 27 March 1996) is a Saudi Arabian professional footballer who plays as a winger for Al-Ula and the Saudi Arabia national team.

== Career ==
Al-Nabit began his career at his local club Al-Lewaa in Baqaa. On 14 August 2011, he left Al-Lewaa and joined the youth team of Al-Ahli. He spent 6 years at Al-Ahli and represented the team at every level besides the first team. On 18 July 2017, he left Al-Ahli and signed a 2-year contract with Medina based club Ohod. On 7 January 2019, Al-Nabit dropped down a division and signed a 6-month contract with Abha. Following Abha's promotion to the Pro League, Al-Nabit renewed his contract for a further year. On 2 January 2020, Al-Nabit signed a pre-contract agreement with Al-Taawoun and was set to join them following the expiry of his contract. On 1 February 2020, Al-Taawoun announced that they bought the remainder of his contract.

On 23 January 2023, Al-Nabit signed a pre-contract agreement with former club Al-Ahli. He officially joined the club following the conclusion of the 2022–23 season.

On 12 September 2025, Al-Nabit joined Al-Ula.

== Career statistics ==
=== Club ===
As of match played 27 May 2025

Appearances and goals by club, season and competition
| Club | Season | League | | | King Cup | | Asia | | Other | | Total | |
| Club | Season | Division | Apps | Goals | Apps | Goals | Apps | Goals | Apps | Goals | Apps | Goals |
|---|---|---|---|---|---|---|---|---|---|---|---|---|
| Ohod | 2017–18 | SPL | 7 | 0 | 1 | 0 | — | | — | | 8 | 0 |
| Ohod | 2018–19 | SPL | 0 | 0 | 0 | 0 | — | | — | | 0 | 0 |
| Ohod | Total | | 7 | 0 | 1 | 0 | 0 | 0 | 0 | 0 | 8 | 0 |
| Abha | 2018–19 | MS League | 18 | 3 | 2 | 1 | — | | — | | 20 | 4 |
| Abha | 2019–20 | SPL | 14 | 1 | 3 | 0 | — | | — | | 17 | 1 |
| Abha | Total | | 32 | 4 | 5 | 1 | 0 | 0 | 0 | 0 | 37 | 5 |
| Al-Taawoun | 2019–20 | SPL | 8 | 0 | 0 | 0 | 1 | 0 | 0 | 0 | 9 | 0 |
| Al-Taawoun | 2020–21 | SPL | 26 | 4 | 4 | 1 | — | | — | | 30 | 5 |
| Al-Taawoun | 2021–22 | SPL | 27 | 2 | 2 | 1 | 7 | 4 | — | | 36 | 7 |
| Al-Taawoun | 2022–23 | SPL | 26 | 3 | 1 | 0 | — | | — | | 27 | 3 |
| Al-Taawoun | Total | | 87 | 9 | 7 | 2 | 8 | 4 | 0 | 0 | 102 | 15 |
| Al-Ahli | 2023–24 | SPL | 27 | 3 | 1 | 1 | — | | — | | 28 | 4 |
| Al-Ahli | 2024–25 | SPL | 19 | 2 | 1 | 0 | 6 | 0 | 1 (Note: Appearance(s) in Saudi Super Cup) | 0 | 27 | 2 |
| Al-Ahli | Total | | 46 | 5 | 2 | 1 | 6 | 0 | 1 | 0 | 55 | 6 |
| Al-Ula | 2025–26 | FDL | 0 | 0 | — | | — | | — | | 0 | 0 |
| Career total | | | 162 | 18 | 15 | 4 | 14 | 4 | 1 | 0 | 202 | 26 |

=== International ===
==== International goals ====
Scores and results list Saudi Arabia's goal tally first.

| No. | Date | Venue | Opponent | Score | Result | Competition |
|---|---|---|---|---|---|---|
| 1. | 6 January 2023 | Basra International Stadium, Basra, Iraq | Yemen | 1–0 | 2–0 | 25th Arabian Gulf Cup |

== Honours ==
Abha

- MS League: 2018–19

Al-Ahli

- Saudi Super Cup: 2025
- AFC Champions League Elite: 2024–25
