= Yaqoub Alhassan =

Saudi Arabian footballer

Personal information
- Full name: Yaqoub Alhassan Dembélé
- Date of birth: February 7, 2001 (age 25)
- Place of birth: Saudi Arabia
- Height: 1.66 m (5 ft 5 in)
- Position: Winger

Youth career
- Al-Taawoun

Senior career*
| Years | Team | Apps | (Gls) |
| 2021–2023 | Al-Taawoun | 14 | (0) |
| 2023–2024 | Al-Saqer | | |
| 2024–2025 | Al-Qwarah | | |
- * Club domestic league appearances and goals as of 11 January 2022

Yaqoub Alhassan (Arabic: يعقوب الحسن; born 7 February 2001) is a Saudi Arabian professional footballer who plays as a winger.

== Club career ==
Alhassan started his career at Al-Taawoun. On 10 February 2021, Alhassan signed his first professional contract with the club. On 26 August 2021, Alhassan made his professional debut for Al-Taawoun against Al-Nassr in the Pro League, replacing Yazeed Al-Bakr.

On 17 July 2023, Alhassan joined Al-Saqer on a free transfer. In October 2024, Alhassan joined Al-Qawarah.
