= Christian Luyindama =

Congolese footballer

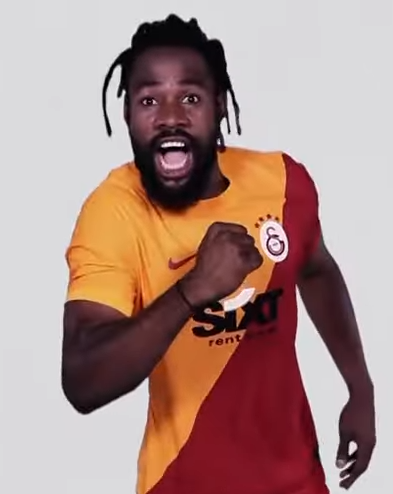
- Luyindama in 2021

Personal information
- Full name: Christian Luyindama Nekadio
- Date of birth: 8 January 1994 (age 32)
- Place of birth: Kinshasa, Zaire
- Height: 1.91 m (6 ft 3 in)
- Position: Centre back

Youth career
- 2012–2014: DCMP
- 2014–2015: Sanga Balende

Senior career*
Years	Team	Apps	(Gls)
2015–2017	TP Mazembe	63	(7)
2017	→ Standard Liège (loan)	6	(1)
2017–2019	Standard Liège	52	(7)
2019	→ Galatasaray (loan)	11	(0)
2019–2023	Galatasaray	42	(1)
2022	→ Al Taawoun (loan)	12	(0)
2022–2023	→ Antalyaspor (loan)	5	(0)

International career
2017–2022	DR Congo	23	(0)
- * Club domestic league appearances and goals

Christian Luyindama Nekadio (born 8 January 1994), is a Congolese professional former footballer who played as a defender. However, Luyindama was a versatile player; he also played as a defensive midfielder and as a forward.

== Club career ==
=== Early career ===
Luyindama began his career in the Linafoot tournament with DCMP, moving to DCMP as an attacker, and then moved to Sa Majesté Sanga Balende for 2 seasons before being transferred to TP Mazembe with whom he won the 2016 CAF Confederation Cup.

=== Standard Liège ===
On 31 January 2017, Luyindama joined Standard Liège on loan with an option given to the club to sign him permanently. The move was made permanent on 18 May 2017.

On 17 March 2018, he played as Standard Liège beat Genk 1–0 in extra time to win the 2018 Belgian Cup Final and qualify for the UEFA Europa League.

=== Galatasaray ===
On 31 January 2019, the last day of the 2018–19 winter transfer window, Luyindama moved to Süper Lig side Galatasaray on loan until the end of the season. The deal included an option for to make the move permanent.

In November 2019 it was announced that he would undergo knee surgery.

==== Loan to Al Taawoun ====
On 30 January 2022, Galatasaray announced Luyindama's half-year deal with Saudi Arabian side Al Taawoun as on loan.

==== Loan to Antalyaspor ====
On 8 September 2022, he signed a 1-year loan contract with Süper Lig team Antalyaspor.

== International career ==
Luyindama made his international debut for the DR Congo national football team in a 2–0 friendly win over Botswana on 5 June 2017.

== Honours ==
TP Mazembe

- CAF Confederation Cup: 2016

Standard Liège

- Belgian Cup: 2017–18

Galatasaray

- Süper Lig: 2018–19
- Turkish Cup: 2018–19
- Turkish Super Cup: 2019

== Career statistics ==
As of match played 21 July 2022

=== Club ===
Appearances and goals by club, season and competition
Club	Season	League	League		Cup		Europe		Total	
Club	Season	League	Apps	Goals	Apps	Goals	Apps	Goals	Apps	Goals
Standard Liège	2016–17	Belgian First Division A	6	1	0	0	0	0	6	1
Standard Liège	2017–18	Belgian First Division A	32	4	6	0	0	0	38	4
Standard Liège	2018–19	Belgian First Division A	20	3	1	0	8	0	29	3
Standard Liège	Total		58	8	7	0	8	0	74	8
Galatasaray	2018–19	Süper Lig	11	0	4	1	2	1	17	2
Galatasaray	2019–20	Süper Lig	10	0	1	0	4	0	15	0
Galatasaray	2020–21	Süper Lig	24	0	2	1	2	1	28	2
Galatasaray	Total		45	0	7	2	8	2	60	4
Al Taawoun (loan)	2021–22	Saudi Pro League	12	0	1	0	—		13	0
Career total			115	8	15	2	16	2	146	12

=== International ===
DR Congo national team
Year	Apps	Goals
2017	2	0
2018	5	0
2019	6	0
2020	2	0
2021	0	0
2022	8	0
Total	23	0
