= Nawaf Al-Rashwodi =

Saudi Arabian footballer

Nawaf Al-Rashoudi
Personal information
- Full name: Nawaf Sufyan Al-Rashoudi
- Date of birth: August 18, 2000 (age 26)
- Place of birth: Saudi Arabia
- Height: 1.62 m (5 ft 4 in)
- Position: Attacking midfielder

Team information
- Current team: Al-Jubail
- Number: 8

Youth career
- Al-Taawoun

Senior career*
Years	Team	Apps	(Gls)
2020–2024	Al-Taawoun	4	(0)
2020–2021	→ Al-Arabi (loan)	21	(3)
2024–2025	Al-Najma	9	(1)
2025–	Al-Jubail		
- * Club domestic league appearances and goals as of 27 May 2024

Nawaf Al-Rashoudi (Arabic: نواف الرشودي; born 18 August 2000) is a Saudi Arabian professional footballer who plays as an attacking midfielder for Al-Jubail.

== Club career ==
Al-Rashoudi started his career at Al-Taawoun and is a product of Al-Taawoun's youth system. He was first called up to the first team after the 2019–20 season resumed following the COVID-19 pandemic. On 24 October 2020, Al-Rashoudi signed his first professional contract with the club. On 5 November 2020, Al-Rashoudi joined Al-Arabi on loan. On 2 October 2021, Al-Rashoudi made his professional debut for Al-Taawoun against Al-Tai in the Pro League, replacing Kaku. On 19 July 2024, Al-Rashoudi joined Al-Najma. On 10 September 2025, Al-Rashoudi joined Al-Jubail.
