= Aschraf El Mahdioui =

Dutch footballer

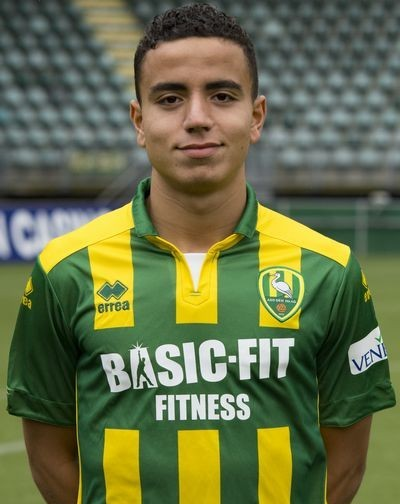
- El Mahdioui with ADO Den Haag in 2016

Personal information
- Date of birth: 24 May 1996 (age 30)
- Place of birth: Amsterdam, Netherlands
- Height: 1.87 m (6 ft 2 in)
- Position: Midfielder

Team information
- Current team: Al Taawoun
- Number: 18

Youth career
- 2013–2015: Ajax

Senior career*
Years	Team	Apps	(Gls)
2015–2016	Jong Ajax	23	(3)
2016–2017	ADO Den Haag	13	(0)
2017–2021	AS Trenčín	97	(9)
2021–2022	Wisła Kraków	16	(1)
2022–	Al Taawoun	113	(6)

International career^{‡}
2025–	Morocco A'	5	(1)
Medal record
Men's football
Representing Morocco
FIFA Arab Cup
Winner	2025 Qatar	Team
- * Club domestic league appearances and goals as of 22:29, 12 December 2025 (UTC) ‡ National team caps and goals as of 18:36, 12 December 2025 (UTC)

Aschraf El Mahdioui (Arabic: أشرف المهديوي; born 24 May 1996) is a professional footballer who plays as a midfielder for and captains Saudi club Al Taawoun. Born in the Netherlands, he plays for the Morocco national team. He previously played for ADO Den Haag, Jong Ajax, Wisła Kraków and AS Trenčín. Besides the Netherlands, he has played in Slovakia, Poland and Saudi Arabia.

== Club career ==
=== Ajax ===
El Mahdioui is a youth exponent from Ajax Amsterdam. He made his professional debut with Jong Ajax on 18 September 2015 in an Eerste Divisie game against Go Ahead Eagles. He replaced Abdelhak Nouri after 65 minutes.

=== ADO Den Haag ===
On 30 June 2016, it was announced that El Mahdioui had signed a three-year contract with Eredivisie side ADO Den Haag.

=== AS Trenčín ===
In June 2017, El Mahdioui signed a three-year contract with AS Trenčín.

== Personal life ==
Born in the Netherlands, El Mahdioui is of Moroccan descent. On 12 March 2015, when El Mahdioui played in the youth academy of Ajax, he was arrested along with teammates Samet Bulut and Zakaria El Azzouzi for assaulting a plainclothed policewoman. The officer suffered shoulder injuries and various bruises. She later filed charges against the three players. A day later, Ajax announced in an official message that they had suspended the players. Later that week, El Azzouzi remained the only suspect in the case. El Mahdioui was allowed to make appearances for the Ajax A1 youth side again after serving a month suspension. As punishment, he had to inform the youth players of Ajax together with Bulut and El Azzouzi.

== Honours ==
Morocco A'

- FIFA Arab Cup: 2025
