= Nawaf Al-Sobhi =

Saudi Arabian footballer

Personal information
- Full name: Nawaf Al-Sobhi
- Date of birth: March 12, 1990 (age 36)
- Place of birth: Mecca, Saudi Arabia
- Height: 1.82 m (5 ft 11 1/2 in)
- Position: Center back

Team information
- Current team: Al-Ansar
- Number: 55

Youth career
- Najran

Senior career*
Years	Team	Apps	(Gls)
2010–2016	Najran	43	(1)
2016–2018	Al-Qadsiah	17	(1)
2018–2020	Al-Fayha	44	(6)
2020–2023	Al-Taawoun	32	(0)
2023	Al-Adalah	1	(0)
2024	Al-Ula	6	(0)
2024–2025	Al-Ain	24	(1)
2025–	Al-Ansar	0	(0)
- * Club domestic league appearances and goals as of 30 May 2021

Nawaf Al-Sobhi (Arabic: نواف الصبحي, born 12 March 1990) is a professional Saudi Arabian footballer who plays as a center back for Al-Ansar.

== Honours ==
=== Club ===
Al-Ula

- Saudi Third Division: 2023–24
