= Mohammed Al-Ghamdi =

Saudi Arabian footballer

Personal information
- Full name: Mohammed Zayed Saeed Al-Ghamdi
- Date of birth: 26 February 1992 (age 34)
- Place of birth: Al Bahah, Saudi Arabia
- Height: 1.80 m (5 ft 11 in)
- Positions: Right-back; centre-back

Team information
- Current team: Al-Anwar (on loan from Al-Faisaly)
- Number: 16

Youth career
- Al-Bahah

Senior career*
Years	Team	Apps	(Gls)
2015–2018	Al-Bahah		
2018–2019	Al-Ain	11	(0)
2019–2021	Ohod	33	(4)
2020–2021	→ Al-Taawoun (loan)	12	(0)
2021–2024	Al-Taawoun	37	(0)
2024–	Al-Faisaly	21	(0)
2025–	→ Al-Anwar (loan)	0	(0)
- * Club domestic league appearances and goals as of 1 June 2023

Mohammed Al-Ghamdi (Arabic: محمد الغامدي; born 26 February 1992) is a Saudi Arabian professional footballer who plays as a right-back or centre-back for Al-Anwar on loan from Al-Faisaly.

== Club career ==
Mohammed Al-Ghamdi began his career at hometown club Al-Bahah. He spent three years at the club from 2015 until 2018. On 14 June 2018, Al-Ghamdi joined First Division side Al-Ain. On 23 July 2019, Al-Ghamdi joined Ohod. On 19 October 2020, Al-Ghamdi joined Pro League side Al-Taawoun on a one-year loan. On 25 January 2021, Al-Ghamdi made his Pro League debut in the 3–1 win against Damac. On 18 February 2021, Al-Ghamdi made his first start in a 2–1 loss to Al-Ittihad. On 30 April 2021, Al-Ghamdi joined Al-Taawoun on a permanent deal. He signed a three-year contract with the club. On 25 August 2021, it was announced that Al-Ghamdi injured his ACL and was ruled out for the rest of the 2021–22 season. On 27 August 2022, a year after his injury, Al-Ghamdi made his return in a 2–0 away win against Al-Fateh. On 15 July 2024, Al-Ghamdi joined Al-Faisaly. On 16 September 2025, Al-Ghamdi joined Al-Anwar on loan.
