= 2022–23 Al-Adalah FC season =

Al-Adalah
2022–23 season
- President: Abdulaziz Al-Mudhey
- Manager: Yousef Al Mannai (until 22 October); Martin Ševela (from 23 October)
- Stadium: Prince Abdullah bin Jalawi Stadium
- SPL: 15th (relegated)
- King Cup: Round of 16 (knocked out by Al-Nassr)
- Top goalscorer: League: Marcus Antonsson (6 goals); All: Marcus Antonsson (6 goals)
- Highest home attendance: 18,025 (vs. Al-Nassr, 4 April 2023)
- Lowest home attendance: 7,392 (vs. Al-Shabab, 14 September 2022)
- Average home league attendance: 12,912
- All statistics correct as of 31 May 2023.

The 2022–23 season was Al-Adalah's 39th year in existence and their first season back in the Pro League following their promotion from the FD League in the previous season. The club participated in the Pro League, and the King Cup.

The season covered the period from 1 July 2022 to 30 June 2023.

== Players ==
=== Squad information ===
As of 1 February 2023

Note: Flags indicate national team as defined under FIFA eligibility rules; some limited exceptions apply. Players may hold more than one non-FIFA nationality.

No.	Pos.	Nation	Player
1	GK	MNE	Milan Mijatović
3	DF	KSA	Fahad Al-Harbi (on loan from Al-Fateh)
5	DF	KSA	Murtadha Al-Burayh
6	MF	KSA	Ahmed Al-Sultan
7	MF	KSA	Arif Al Haydar
8	DF	KSA	Abdullah Al-Yousef (captain)
10	FW	COL	Reinaldo Lenis
11	MF	KSA	Abdulaziz Al-Jamaan
12	FW	SWE	Marcus Antonsson
13	GK	KSA	Mohammed Al-Bladi
14	MF	KSA	Abdulrahman Al-Hurib
15	MF	KSA	Nasser Al-Meqhem
16	MF	KSA	Khaled Al-Hamdhi
17	MF	PER	Christofer Gonzáles
18	MF	KSA	Elyas Al-Bladi
19	MF	BRA	Edson

No.	Pos.	Nation	Player
20	MF	KSA	Mohammed Abu Abd
21	FW	KSA	Waleed Al-Shangeati
22	GK	KSA	Ali Al-Ameri (Saudi Arabian footballer)
23	DF	KSA	Mohammed Al-Oufi (on loan from Al-Ittihad)
24	MF	KSA	Hassan Al-Habib (on loan from Al-Fateh)
27	MF	KSA	Fawaz Al-Torais (on loan from Al-Hilal)
33	DF	SVK	Boris Godál (on loan from Železiarne Podbrezová)
43	MF	SLO	David Tijanić (on loan from Göztepe)
49	DF	KSA	Ali Al-Salem
50	DF	KSA	Abdulaziz Al-Alawi
55	DF	KSA	Nawaf Al-Sobhi
73	GK	KSA	Mohammed Al-Moqahwi
90	MF	POR	Pedro Eugénio
91	FW	KSA	Abdulaziz Al-Yousef
96	MF	KSA	Hussain Al-Nattar (on loan from Al-Qadsiah)

=== Out on loan ===
Note: Flags indicate national team as defined under FIFA eligibility rules; some limited exceptions apply. Players may hold more than one non-FIFA nationality.

No.	Pos.	Nation	Player
—	MF	KSA	Abdulmajeed Al-Saeed (at Hajer until 30 June 2023)

== Transfers and loans ==
=== Transfers in ===
Entry date	Position	No.	Player	From club	Fee	Ref.
30 June 2022	MF	24	(Saudi Arabia) Abdulmajeed Al-Saeed	(Saudi Arabia) Al-Jeel	End of loan	
1 July 2022	GK	1	(Montenegro) Milan Mijatović	(Hungary) MTK Budapest	Free	
1 July 2022	DF	2	(Switzerland) Martin Angha	(Netherlands) Fortuna Sittard	Free	
1 July 2022	DF	4	(Guinea) Mikael Dyrestam	(Belgium) Seraing	Free	
1 July 2022	MF	10	(Colombia) Reinaldo Lenis	(Greece) Ionikos	Free	
7 July 2022	MF	17	(Peru) Christofer Gonzáles	(Peru) Sporting Cristal	$450,000	
20 July 2022	MF	19	(Brazil) Edson	(Brazil) Atlético Goianiense	$300,000	
21 July 2022	FW	77	(Saudi Arabia) Abdullah Hadhereti	(Saudi Arabia) Al-Qadsiah	Free	
24 July 2022	MF	7	(Saudi Arabia) Arif Al Haydar	(Saudi Arabia) Damac	Undisclosed	
8 August 2022	FW	71	(Colombia) Anderson Plata	(Colombia) Deportes Tolima	Free	
16 January 2023	DF	55	(Saudi Arabia) Nawaf Al-Sobhi	(Saudi Arabia) Al-Taawoun	Undisclosed	
17 January 2023	DF	50	(Saudi Arabia) Abdulaziz Al-Alawi	(Saudi Arabia) Al-Nassr	Free	
25 January 2023	MF	90	(Portugal) Pedro Eugénio	(Kazakhstan) Astana	Free	
25 January 2023	FW	12	(Sweden) Marcus Antonsson	(Sweden) IFK Värnamo	Free	

=== Loans in ===
Start date	End date	Position	No.	Player	From club	Fee	Ref.
4 July 2022	28 January 2023	FW	9	(Argentina) Lautaro Palacios	(Chile) Audax Italiano	None	
9 August 2022	End of season	MF	96	(Saudi Arabia) Hussain Al-Nattar	(Saudi Arabia) Al-Qadsiah	None	
18 August 2022	End of season	DF	23	(Saudi Arabia) Mohammed Al-Oufi	(Saudi Arabia) Al-Ittihad	$80,000	
20 August 2022	End of season	MF	24	(Saudi Arabia) Hassan Al-Habib	(Saudi Arabia) Al-Fateh	None	
20 August 2022	End of season	MF	27	(Saudi Arabia) Fawaz Al-Torais	(Saudi Arabia) Al-Hilal	None	
27 August 2022	End of season	DF	3	(Saudi Arabia) Fahad Al-Harbi	(Saudi Arabia) Al-Fateh	None	
14 January 2023	End of season	MF	43	(Slovenia) David Tijanić	(Turkey) Göztepe	None	
29 January 2023	End of season	DF	33	(Slovakia) Boris Godál	(Slovakia) Železiarne Podbrezová	None	

=== Transfers out ===
Exit date	Position	No.	Player	To club	Fee	Ref.
30 June 2022	MF	71	(Saudi Arabia) Ahmed Al-Anzi	(Saudi Arabia) Al-Faisaly	End of loan	
30 June 2022	MF	99	(Mali) Ibrahima Tandia	(Saudi Arabia) Al-Hazem	End of loan	
1 July 2022	DF	4	(Brazil) Nailson	(Saudi Arabia) Al-Jabalain	Free	
1 July 2022	DF	33	(Saudi Arabia) Enad Al-Khalifah	(Saudi Arabia) Al-Orobah	Free	
1 July 2022	DF	44	(Saudi Arabia) Fahad Al-Munaif	(Saudi Arabia) Al-Riyadh	Free	
4 July 2022	DF	19	(Saudi Arabia) Ayman Masrahi	(Saudi Arabia) Al-Najma	Free	
16 July 2022	DF	27	(Saudi Arabia) Awadh Khrees	(Saudi Arabia) Al-Riyadh	Free	
16 July 2022	DF	90	(Saudi Arabia) Saud Fallatah	(Saudi Arabia) Al-Qadsiah	Free	
4 August 2022	MF	10	(Brazil) Alan Cariús	(Japan) Kyoto Sanga	Free	
28 August 2022	MF	30	(Nigeria) Ogenyi Onazi	(Italy) Casertana	Free	
1 September 2022	FW	26	(Saudi Arabia) Ali Al-Mayyad	(Saudi Arabia) Najran	Free	
1 January 2023	FW	77	(Saudi Arabia) Abdullah Hadhereti	(Saudi Arabia) Al-Kholood	Free	
8 January 2023	FW	25	(Nigeria) Tunde Adeniji	(Kuwait) Al-Tadamon	Free	
16 January 2023	DF	2	(Switzerland) Martin Angha		Released	
20 January 2023	MF	70	(Saudi Arabia) Nasser Al-Abdeli	(Saudi Arabia) Al-Arabi	Free	
28 January 2023	DF	4	(Guinea) Mikael Dyrestam	(Saudi Arabia) Najran	Free	
30 January 2023	FW	71	(Colombia) Anderson Plata	(Saudi Arabia) Al-Jabalain	Free	

=== Loans out ===
Start date	End date	Position	No.	Player	To club	Fee	Ref.
24 August 2022	End of season	MF	24	(Saudi Arabia) Abdulmajeed Al-Saeed	(Saudi Arabia) Hajer	None	

== Pre-season ==
29 July 2022 Friendly	Al-Adalah (Saudi Arabia)	3–1	(Greece) Apollon Smyrnis	Slovenia
17:30 CEST	Angha 27'; Al-Hurib 32'; Palacios 59'	Report

2 August 2022 Friendly	Al-Adalah (Saudi Arabia)	1–2	(Algeria) Paradou AC	Čatež ob Savi, Slovenia
17:30 CEST	Al-Hurib	Report	Bouzida; Kaassis	Stadium: Terme Čatež Football Field

10 August 2022 Global Tour for Peace	Al-Adalah (Saudi Arabia)	0–1	(Ukraine) Shakhtar Donetsk	Kranj, Slovenia
12:00 CEST		Report	Al-Jamaan 42' (o.g.)	Stadium: National Football Center Brdo

12 August 2022 Friendly	Al-Adalah (Saudi Arabia)	3–2	(Croatia) NK Jarun Zagreb	Slovenia
17:30 CEST	Al-Shangeati 35'; Lenis 70'; Gonzáles 90'	Report

19 August 2022 Friendly	Al-Adalah (Saudi Arabia)	1–2	(Saudi Arabia) Al-Shabab	Riyadh, Saudi Arabia
19:15 AST	Lenis	Report	Guanca; Al-Abed (pen.)	Stadium: Prince Khalid bin Sultan Stadium

== Competitions ==
=== Overview ===
Competition	Record							
Competition	G	W	D	L	GF	GA	GD	Win %
Pro League	30	7	7	16	30	56	−26	23.33
King Cup	1	0	0	1	0	2	−2	0.00
Total	31	7	7	17	30	58	−28	22.58

Updated to match played 31 May 2023
Source: Competitions

=== Pro League ===
==== League table ====
Pos	Team	Pld	W	D	L	GF	GA	GD	Pts	Qualification or relegation
12	Abha	30	10	3	17	33	52	−19	33 (Note: Al-Fayha finished ahead of Abha on head-to-head points: Al-Fayha: 4 pts, Abha: 1 pts (Abha 1–1 Al-Fayha, Al-Fayha 2–0 Abha).)	
13	Al-Wehda	30	8	8	14	26	43	−17	32	
14	Al-Khaleej	30	9	4	17	30	44	−14	31	
15	Al-Adalah (R)	30	7	7	16	30	56	−26	28	Relegated to the First Division League
16	Al-Batin (R)	30	5	5	20	27	63	−36	20	Relegated to the First Division League

Updated to match(es) played on 31 May 2023. Source: SPL
Rules for classification: 1) Points; 2) Head-to-head points; 3) Head-to-head goal difference; 4) Total goal difference; 5) Total goals scored; 6) Fair-play points (Note: Head-to-head record is used only after all the matches between the teams in question have been played).
(R) Relegated

==== Results summary ====
Overall								Home						Away					
Pld	W	D	L	GF	GA	GD	Pts	W	D	L	GF	GA	GD	W	D	L	GF	GA	GD
30	7	7	16	30	56	−26	28	5	2	8	14	26	−12	2	5	8	16	30	−14

Last updated: 31 May 2023.
Source: spl.com.sa

==== Results by round ====
Round	1	2	3	4	5	6	7	8	9	10	11	12	13	14	15	16	17	18	19	20	21	22	23	24	25	26	27	28	29	30
Ground	H	A	A	H	A	H	A	H	A	H	A	H	A	H	A	A	H	H	A	H	A	H	A	H	A	H	A	H	A	H
Result	L	L	D	L	L	W	L	L	L	L	D	W	L	D	L	L	D	W	W	L	D	L	D	W	L	L	W	W	D	L
Position	16	15	15	15	15	11	13	13	14	15	14	14	15	15	15	15	15	15	15	15	15	15	14	14	15	15	15	15	15	15

Updated to match(es) played on 31 May 2023. Source: spl.com.sa
A = Away; H = Home; W = Win; D = Draw; L = Loss

==== Matches ====
All times are local, AST (UTC+3).

Win Draw Loss Postponed

26 August 2022 1	Al-Adalah	0–3	Al-Ittihad	Al-Hasa
18:45	Lenis (yellow card) 90+3'; Al-Shangeati (yellow card) 90+4'	Report	Sharahili 15'; Al-Aboud (yellow card) 67'; Camara 90'; Al-Shamrani 90+5'	Stadium: Prince Abdullah bin Jalawi Stadium; Attendance: 16,250; Referee: Slavko Vinčić (Slovenia)

2 September 2022 2	Al-Tai	1–0	Al-Adalah	Ha'il
19:00	Harzan 15', (yellow card) 61'; Semedo (yellow card) 43'	Report	Al-Burayh (yellow card) 30'; Al-Habib (yellow card) 58'; Al-Abdeli (yellow card) 61'; Edson (yellow card) 83'	Stadium: Prince Abdul Aziz bin Musa'ed Stadium; Attendance: 6,724; Referee: Abdullah Al-Kharboush

8 September 2022 3	Al-Khaleej	0–0	Al-Adalah	Dammam
18:30	Benlamri (yellow card) 75'; Al-Samiri (yellow card) 87'	Report	Al-Hamdhi (yellow card) 49'; Al-Habib (yellow card) 70'	Stadium: Prince Mohamed bin Fahd Stadium; Attendance: 1,968; Referee: Mohammed Al-Beredi

14 September 2022 4	Al-Adalah	0–1	Al-Shabab	Al-Hasa
21:00	Edson (yellow card) 37'	Report	Carlos 3'; Bahebri (yellow card) 89'	Stadium: Prince Abdullah bin Jalawi Stadium; Attendance: 7,392; Referee: Shukri Al-Hanfoush

1 October 2022 5	Al-Raed	2–1	Al-Adalah	Buraidah
18:30	El Berkaoui 63'; Tavares 71'	Report	Edson (yellow card) 28'; Palacios 35'; Al-Hurib (yellow card) 71'	Stadium: King Abdullah Sport City Stadium; Attendance: 4,309; Referee: Sultan Al-Harbi

7 October 2022 6	Al-Adalah	2–1	Al-Fayha	Al-Hasa
21:00	Al-Torais 2'; Gonzáles 65'; Hadhereti (yellow card) 83'; Al Haydar (yellow card) 85'	Report	Nwakaeme 54'; Paulinho (yellow card) 90+1'	Stadium: Prince Abdullah bin Jalawi Stadium; Attendance: 7,632; Referee: Mohammed Al-Beredi

11 October 2022 7	Al-Nassr	4–1	Al-Adalah	Riyadh
20:30	Yahya 22', 26'; Aboubakar 28', (yellow card) 30'; Talisca 78'; Al-Khaibari (yellow card) 90+2'	Report	Gonzáles 87' (pen.); Al-Nattar (yellow card) 90+3'	Stadium: Mrsool Park; Attendance: 11,894; Referee: Khaled Al-Teris

16 October 2022 8	Al-Adalah	0–2	Damac	Al-Hasa
20:30	Al-Nattar (yellow card) 3'; Palacios (yellow card) 66'	Report	Soudani 45'; Nono 58'; Al-Shammeri (yellow card) 81'	Stadium: Prince Abdullah bin Jalawi Stadium; Attendance: 12,978; Referee: Sultan Al-Harbi

15 December 2022 9	Al-Taawoun	4–1	Al-Adalah	Buraidah
18:00	Medrán 5', 41'; Al-Nasser 52', (yellow card) 77'; Kaku 69'	Report	Al-Burayh (yellow card) 40'; Palacios (yellow card) 45+6'; Al-Salem (yellow card) 88'; Plata 90+4'	Stadium: King Abdullah Sport City Stadium; Attendance: 4,520; Referee: Mohammed Al-Hoaish

25 December 2022 10	Al-Adalah	0–2	Abha	Al-Hasa
18:00	Dyrestam (yellow card) 45+2'; Al-Sultan (yellow card) 45+5'; Al-Burayh (yellow card) 46'; Al-Habib (yellow card) 59'; Al-Harbi (yellow card) 90+8'	Report	Al-Sadi 12'; Al-Zori (yellow card) 43'; Amr (yellow card) 45'; Bguir 64'; Natiq (yellow card) 82'	Stadium: Prince Abdullah bin Jalawi Stadium; Attendance: 14,859; Referee: Abdulsamad Bakri

30 December 2022 11	Al-Wehda	0–0	Al-Adalah	Mecca
18:00	Al Hejji (yellow card) 45+2'; Al-Qahtani (yellow card) 74'; Al-Hafith (yellow card) 90+7'	Report		Stadium: King Abdul Aziz Stadium; Attendance: 1,259; Referee: Mohammed Abu Shaqarah

6 January 2023 12	Al-Adalah	2–1	Al-Fateh	Al-Hasa
18:00	Al Haydar 51'; Plata 64'; Edson (yellow card) 90+10'	Report	Vélez (yellow card) 60'; Petros (yellow card) 71'; Al-Buraikan 72', (yellow card) 90+9'	Stadium: Prince Abdullah bin Jalawi Stadium; Attendance: 9,428; Referee: Majed Al-Shamrani

15 January 2023 13	Al-Hilal	2–0	Al-Adalah	Riyadh
18:00	S. Al-Dawsari 66' (pen.); Cuéllar (yellow card) 70'; Al-Shehri 73'; Carrillo (yellow card) 90+4'	Report	Al-Harbi (yellow card) 65' (yellow-red card) 85'; Al-Hamdhi (yellow card) 75'; Al-Salem (yellow card) 75'; Al Haydar (yellow card) 90+5'	Stadium: Prince Faisal bin Fahd Stadium; Attendance: 5,154; Referee: Luís Godinho (Portugal)

19 January 2023 14	Al-Adalah	1–1	Al-Batin	Al-Hasa
15:30	Tijanić 59'; Al-Hurib (yellow card) 90+6'	Report	Mudasiru (yellow card) 32'; Al-Qarni (yellow card) 58'; Al-Oufi 86' (o.g.)	Stadium: Prince Abdullah bin Jalawi Stadium; Attendance: 14,915; Referee: Abdullah Al-Kharbosh

3 February 2023 15	Al-Ettifaq	3–2	Al-Adalah	Dammam
20:30	Niakaté 3'; Quaison 76' (pen.); Vitinho 82'; Özdemir (yellow card) 90+12'	Report	Godál 43', (yellow card) 58'; Antonsson 47'; Gonzáles (yellow card) 64' (yellow-red card) 70'	Stadium: Prince Mohamed bin Fahd Stadium; Attendance: 2,812; Referee: Mamdouh Al Shahdan

10 February 2023 16	Al-Ittihad	5–0	Al-Adalah	Jeddah
20:30	Romarinho 17'; Hamdallah 37', 67', (yellow card) 59'; Coronado 90+4' (pen.); Camara 90+8'	Report	Al-Harbi (yellow card) 54' (yellow-red card) 60'; Al-Sobhi (yellow card) 90+3'	Stadium: King Abdullah Sports City; Attendance: 53,990; Referee: Tamás Bognár (Hungary)

16 February 2023 17	Al-Adalah	2–2	Al-Tai	Al-Hasa
18:00	Al-Hamdhi (yellow card) 37'; Lenis (yellow card) 45+3'; Gonzáles 59'; Antonsson 68'	Report	Musona 63'; Ali 65', (yellow card) 90+10'	Stadium: Prince Abdullah bin Jalawi Stadium; Attendance: 9,879; Referee: Mohammed Al-Beredi

24 February 2023 18	Al-Adalah	2–0	Al-Khaleej	Al-Hasa
18:00	Tijanić (yellow card) 9'; Lenis 50'; Al-Hamdhi (yellow card) 69'; Antonsson 71'; Al-Oufi (yellow card) 82'	Report	Al-Nowaiqi (yellow card) 40'; Al-Shanqiti (yellow card) 75'; Souza (yellow card) 90+4'	Stadium: Prince Abdullah bin Jalawi Stadium; Attendance: 9,677; Referee: Radu Petrescu (Romania)

4 March 2023 19	Al-Shabab	1–2	Al-Adalah	Riyadh
20:30	Boupendza 20', (yellow card) 73'; Al-Qahtani (yellow card) 68'	Report	Al-Oufi (yellow card) 24'; Tijanić 62'; Eugénio (yellow card) 73', (goal) 90+7'; Al-Salem (yellow card) 81'; Al-Jamaan (yellow card) 90+6'; Al-Sultan (yellow card) 90+10'	Stadium: Prince Faisal bin Fahd Stadium; Attendance: 3,850; Referee: Abdullah Al-Harbi

11 March 2023 20	Al-Adalah	0–3	Al-Raed	Al-Hasa
18:00	Godál (yellow card) 45+2'; Al-Oufi (yellow card) 45+5'; Al-Sultan (yellow card) 62' (yellow-red card) 63'; Al-Jamaan (yellow card) 85'	Report	Salem (yellow card) 42'; Fouzair 45+7', (yellow card) 56'; Tavares 86' (pen.); Mitriță (yellow card) 89'; Al-Beshe 90+7'	Stadium: Prince Abdullah bin Jalawi Stadium; Attendance: 15,073; Referee: Matej Jug (Slovenia)

17 March 2023 21	Al-Fayha	1–1	Al-Adalah	Al Majma'ah
16:00	Al-Baqawi (yellow card) 63'; Nwakaeme 90+6'	Report	Al-Salem 35'; Al-Hamdhi (yellow card) 51'	Stadium: Al Majma'ah Sports City; Attendance: 3,716; Referee: Abdullah Al-Shehri

4 April 2023 22	Al-Adalah	0–5	Al-Nassr	Al-Hasa
22:00	Al-Hamdhi (yellow card) 34'	Report	Ronaldo 40' (pen.), 66'; Talisca 55', 78'; S. Al-Ghannam (yellow card) 61'; Yahya 90+8'	Stadium: Prince Abdullah bin Jalawi Stadium; Attendance: 18,025; Referee: Abdullah Al-Harbi

10 April 2023 23	Damac	2–2	Al-Adalah	Khamis Mushait
22:00	Bedrane 16'; Nono 32'; Zeghba (yellow card) 44'; Hassoun (yellow card) 85'; Al-Enezi (yellow card) 89'	Report	Antonsson 28' (pen.), 30'; Al Haydar (yellow card) 45'; Al-Oufi (yellow card) 45+2'	Stadium: Damac Club Stadium; Attendance: 3,302; Referee: Mohammed Al-Hoaish

27 April 2023 24	Al-Adalah	2–1	Al-Taawoun	Al-Hasa
19:00	Eugénio 1'; Tijanić 40'; Godál (yellow card) 70'; Al-Harbi (yellow card) 87'; Lenis (yellow card) 90+4'	Report	Al-Nabit 51'	Stadium: Prince Abdullah bin Jalawi Stadium; Attendance: 9,828; Referee: Sultan Al-Harbi

2 May 2023 25	Abha	1–0	Al-Adalah	Abha
19:00	Natiq (yellow card) 73'; Bguir 81'; Saddiki (yellow card) 90'	Report	Al Haydar (yellow card) 57'	Stadium: Prince Sultan bin Abdul Aziz Stadium; Attendance: 449; Referee: Abdullah Al-Kharbosh

8 May 2023 26	Al-Adalah	1–2	Al-Wehda	Al-Hasa
19:00	Al-Hamdhi (yellow card) 46'; Godál 58'	Report	Anselmo (yellow card) 31', (goal) 90+4'; Yoda 45+2'; Al Hejji (yellow card) 57'; Bakshween (yellow card) 89'; Al-Ghamdi (yellow card) 90+5'	Stadium: Prince Abdullah bin Jalawi Stadium; Attendance: 14,557; Referee: Sultan Al-Harbi

15 May 2023 27	Al-Fateh	2–4	Al-Adalah	Al-Hasa
21:30	Petros (yellow card) 64'; Al-Buraikan 65', 90+10'; Al-Daheem (yellow card) 75'	Report	Eugénio 25'; Lenis 32'; Al-Harbi (yellow card) 44'; Gonzáles 59'; Al-Oufi 61'	Stadium: Prince Abdullah bin Jalawi Stadium; Attendance: 12,834; Referee: Khaled Al-Teris

23 May 2023 28	Al-Adalah	2–0	Al-Hilal	Al-Hasa
19:00	Antonsson 23' (pen.), (yellow card) 88'; Godál (yellow card) 45+5'; Al-Alawi (red card) 48'; Eugénio 84', (yellow card) 90+7'	Report	K. Al-Dawsari (yellow card) 42'; Al-Qahtani (yellow card) 66'	Stadium: Prince Abdullah bin Jalawi Stadium; Attendance: 18,009; Referee: Sami Al-Jires

27 May 2023 29	Al-Batin	2–2	Al-Adalah	Hafar al-Batin
21:00	López 43'; N. Al-Sohaymi (yellow card) 55'; Y. Al-Shammari 67'; Saad (yellow card) 90+2'	Report	Tijanić 45+6'; Al-Hamdhi (yellow card) 88'; Lenis 90+15'	Stadium: Al-Batin Club Stadium; Attendance: 3,216; Referee: Faisal Al-Blwi

31 May 2023 30	Al-Adalah	0–2	Al-Ettifaq	Al-Hasa
21:00	Al-Alawi (yellow card) 18'; Al-Harbi (yellow card) 90+5'	Report	H. Al-Ghamdi 89', 90+9'	Stadium: Prince Abdullah bin Jalawi Stadium; Attendance: 15,179; Referee: Khaled Al-Teris

=== King Cup ===
All times are local, AST (UTC+3).

21 December 2022 Round of 16	Al-Nassr	2–0	Al-Adalah	Riyadh
21:00	Álvaro (yellow card) 40'; Yahya 41'; Al-Najei 85'; Talisca (yellow card) 90+8'	Report	Abo Abd (yellow card) 90+8'	Stadium: Prince Abdulrahman bin Saud Stadium; Referee: Mohammed Al-Esmaiel

== Statistics ==
=== Appearances ===
Last updated on 31 May 2023.

No.	Pos	Nat	Player	Total		Pro League		King Cup	
No.	Pos	Nat	Player	Apps	Goals	Apps	Goals	Apps	Goals
Goalkeepers
1	GK	(Montenegro) MNE	Milan Mijatović	31	0	30	0	1	0
22	GK	(Saudi Arabia) KSA	Ali Al-Ameri	0	0	0	0	0	0
Defenders
3	DF	(Saudi Arabia) KSA	Fahad Al-Harbi	21	0	14+7	0	0	0
5	DF	(Saudi Arabia) KSA	Murtadha Al-Burayh	14	0	7+6	0	1	0
8	DF	(Saudi Arabia) KSA	Abdullah Al-Yousef	4	0	2+2	0	0	0
23	DF	(Saudi Arabia) KSA	Mohammed Al-Oufi	25	1	20+4	1	1	0
33	DF	(Slovakia) SVK	Boris Godál	15	2	15	2	0	0
49	DF	(Saudi Arabia) KSA	Ali Al-Salem	22	1	20+1	1	1	0
50	DF	(Saudi Arabia) KSA	Abdulaziz Al-Alawi	7	0	2+5	0	0	0
55	DF	(Saudi Arabia) KSA	Nawaf Al-Sobhi	1	0	0+1	0	0	0
Midfielders
6	MF	(Saudi Arabia) KSA	Ahmed Al-Sultan	9	0	3+5	0	0+1	0
7	MF	(Saudi Arabia) KSA	Arif Al Haydar	24	1	11+12	1	0+1	0
10	MF	(Colombia) COL	Reinaldo Lenis	23	3	23	3	0	0
11	MF	(Saudi Arabia) KSA	Abdulaziz Al-Jamaan	25	0	19+5	0	1	0
14	MF	(Saudi Arabia) KSA	Abdulrahman Al-Hurib	19	0	12+6	0	0+1	0
15	MF	(Saudi Arabia) KSA	Nasser Al-Meqhem	0	0	0	0	0	0
16	MF	(Saudi Arabia) KSA	Khaled Al-Hamdhi	14	0	10+4	0	0	0
17	MF	(Peru) PER	Christofer Gonzáles	27	4	25+1	4	1	0
18	MF	(Saudi Arabia) KSA	Elyas Al-Bladi	0	0	0	0	0	0
19	MF	(Brazil) BRA	Edson	18	0	16+1	0	1	0
20	MF	(Saudi Arabia) KSA	Mohammed Abo Abd	11	0	0+10	0	0+1	0
24	MF	(Saudi Arabia) KSA	Hassan Al-Habib	24	0	5+18	0	1	0
27	MF	(Saudi Arabia) KSA	Fawaz Al-Torais	5	1	5	1	0	0
43	MF	(Slovenia) SLO	David Tijanić	18	4	18	4	0	0
90	MF	(Portugal) POR	Pedro Eugénio	14	4	14	4	0	0
96	MF	(Saudi Arabia) KSA	Hussain Al-Nattar	5	0	1+4	0	0	0
Forwards
12	FW	(Sweden) SWE	Marcus Antonsson	16	6	16	6	0	0
21	FW	(Saudi Arabia) KSA	Waleed Al-Shangeati	10	0	4+5	0	0+1	0
Player who made an appearance this season but have left the club
2	DF	(Switzerland) SUI	Martin Angha	9	0	9	0	0	0
4	DF	(Guinea) GUI	Mikael Dyrestam	10	0	9	0	1	0
9	FW	(Argentina) ARG	Lautaro Palacios	13	1	10+2	1	1	0
70	MF	(Saudi Arabia) KSA	Nasser Al-Abdeli	7	0	4+3	0	0	0
71	FW	(Colombia) COL	Anderson Plata	7	2	6	2	1	0
77	FW	(Saudi Arabia) KSA	Abdullah Hadhereti	6	0	0+6	0	0	0

=== Goalscorers ===
Rank	No.	Pos	Nat	Name	Pro League	King Cup	Total
1	12	FW	(Sweden)	Marcus Antonsson	6	0	6
2	17	MF	(Peru)	Christofer Gonzáles	4	0	4
2	43	MF	(Slovenia)	David Tijanić	4	0	4
2	90	MF	(Portugal)	Pedro Eugénio	4	0	4
5	10	MF	(Colombia)	Reinaldo Lenis	3	0	3
6	33	DF	(Slovakia)	Boris Godál	2	0	2
6	71	FW	(Colombia)	Anderson Plata	2	0	2
8	7	MF	(Saudi Arabia)	Arif Al Haydar	1	0	1
8	9	FW	(Argentina)	Lautaro Palacios	1	0	1
8	23	DF	(Saudi Arabia)	Mohammed Al-Oufi	1	0	1
8	27	MF	(Saudi Arabia)	Fawaz Al-Torais	1	0	1
8	49	DF	(Saudi Arabia)	Ali Al-Salem	1	0	1
Own goal					0	0	0
Total					30	0	30

Last Updated: 27 May 2023

=== Assists ===
Rank	No.	Pos	Nat	Name	Pro League	King Cup	Total
1	17	MF	(Peru)	Christofer Gonzáles	5	0	5
2	7	MF	(Saudi Arabia)	Arif Al Haydar	2	0	2
2	10	MF	(Colombia)	Reinaldo Lenis	2	0	2
4	6	MF	(Saudi Arabia)	Ahmed Al-Sultan	1	0	1
4	11	MF	(Saudi Arabia)	Abdulaziz Al-Jamaan	1	0	1
4	16	MF	(Saudi Arabia)	Khaled Al-Hamdhi	1	0	1
4	21	FW	(Saudi Arabia)	Waleed Al-Shangeati	1	0	1
4	23	DF	(Saudi Arabia)	Mohammed Al-Oufi	1	0	1
4	43	MF	(Slovenia)	David Tijanić	1	0	1
4	50	DF	(Saudi Arabia)	Abdulaziz Al-Alawi	1	0	1
4	71	FW	(Colombia)	Anderson Plata	1	0	1
4	90	MF	(Portugal)	Pedro Eugénio	1	0	1
Total					18	0	18

Last Updated: 27 May 2023

=== Clean sheets ===
Rank	No.	Pos	Nat	Name	Pro League	King Cup	Total
1	1	GK	(Montenegro)	Milan Mijatović	4	0	4
Total					4	0	4

Last Updated: 23 May 2023
