= 2022–23 Al Hilal SFC season =

Al-Hilal
2022–23 season
- President: Fahd Bin Saad Bin Nafel
- Head coach: Ramón Díaz
- Stadium: Prince Faisal bin Fahd Stadium
- Saudi Pro League: 3rd
- King Cup: Winners
- Saudi Super Cup: Semi-finals (knocked out by Al-Fayha)
- AFC Champions League: Runners-up (knocked out by Urawa Red Diamonds)
- FIFA Club World Cup: Runners-up (knocked out by Real Madrid)
- Top goalscorer: League: Odion Ighalo (19); All: Odion Ighalo (26)
- Highest home attendance: 50,881 v Urawa Red Diamonds; 29 April 2023; Champions League
- Lowest home attendance: 3,714 v Abha; 22 January 2023; Saudi Pro League
- Average home league attendance: 9,541
- Biggest win: 7–0 v Al-Duhail; 26 February 2023; Champions League
- Biggest defeat: 0–3 v Al-Shabab; 7 April 2023; Saudi Pro League
Home colours	Away colours	Third colours

The 2022–23 season was Al-Hilal's 47th consecutive season in the top flight of Saudi football and 65th year in existence as a football club. The club participated in the Pro League, the King Cup, the AFC Champions League, the FIFA Club World Cup, and the Saudi Super Cup. The season covered the period from 1 July 2022 to 30 June 2023.

== Players ==
=== Squad information ===
As of 1 February 2023

Note: Flags indicate national team as defined under FIFA eligibility rules; some limited exceptions apply. Players may hold more than one non-FIFA nationality.

No.	Pos.	Nation	Player
1	GK	KSA	Abdullah Al-Mayouf
2	DF	KSA	Mohammed Al-Breik
4	DF	KSA	Khalifah Al-Dawsari
5	DF	KSA	Ali Al-Bulaihi
6	MF	COL	Gustavo Cuéllar
7	MF	KSA	Salman Al-Faraj (captain)
8	MF	KSA	Abdullah Otayf
9	FW	NGR	Odion Ighalo
10	FW	ARG	Luciano Vietto
11	FW	KSA	Saleh Al-Shehri
12	DF	KSA	Yasser Al-Shahrani
14	FW	KSA	Abdullah Al-Hamdan
16	MF	KSA	Nasser Al-Dawsari
17	FW	MLI	Moussa Marega
19	MF	PER	André Carrillo
20	DF	KOR	Jang Hyun-soo

No.	Pos.	Nation	Player
21	GK	KSA	Mohammed Al-Owais
26	MF	KSA	Abdulellah Al-Malki
28	MF	KSA	Mohamed Kanno
29	MF	KSA	Salem Al-Dawsari
31	GK	KSA	Habib Al-Wotayan
32	DF	KSA	Muteb Al-Mufarrij
42	DF	KSA	Muath Faqeehi
43	MF	KSA	Musab Al-Juwayr
56	MF	KSA	Mohammed Al-Qahtani
57	MF	KSA	Nasser Al-Hadhood
60	GK	KSA	Ahmed Al Jubaya
66	DF	KSA	Saud Abdulhamid
67	DF	KSA	Mohammed Al-Khaibari
70	DF	KSA	Mohammed Jahfali
88	DF	KSA	Hamad Al-Yami
96	MF	BRA	Michael

=== Out on loan ===
Note: Flags indicate national team as defined under FIFA eligibility rules; some limited exceptions apply. Players may hold more than one non-FIFA nationality.

No.	Pos.	Nation	Player
13	DF	KSA	Abdulrahman Al-Obaid (at Al-Ettifaq until 30 June 2023)
15	MF	BRA	Matheus Pereira (at Al-Wahda until 30 June 2023)
27	MF	KSA	Fawaz Al-Torais (at Al-Adalah until 30 June 2023)
34	FW	KSA	Turki Al-Mutairi (at Al-Taawoun until 30 June 2023)

No.	Pos.	Nation	Player
44	MF	KSA	Saad Al-Nasser (at Al-Taawoun until 30 June 2023)
49	FW	KSA	Abdullah Radif (at Al-Taawoun until 30 June 2023)
55	MF	KSA	Hamad Al-Abdan (at Al-Khaleej until 30 June 2023)
—	DF	KSA	Bandar Wohaishi (at Al-Jabalain until 30 June 2023)

== Transfers and loans ==
=== Transfers in ===
Entry date	Position	No.	Player	From club	Fee	Ref.
30 June 2022	GK	31	(Saudi Arabia) Habib Al-Wotayan	(Saudi Arabia) Al-Hazem	End of loan	
30 June 2022	GK	40	(Saudi Arabia) Nawaf Al-Ghamdi	(Saudi Arabia) Al-Shoulla	End of loan	
30 June 2022	DF	4	(Saudi Arabia) Khalifah Al-Dawsari	(Saudi Arabia) Al-Fateh	End of loan	
30 June 2022	DF	39	(Saudi Arabia) Nawaf Al-Mufarrij	(Saudi Arabia) Jeddah	End of loan	
30 June 2022	DF	–	(Saudi Arabia) Mohammed Al-Nasser	(Saudi Arabia) Al-Jabalain	End of loan	
30 June 2022	MF	35	(Saudi Arabia) Mansor Al-Beshe	(Saudi Arabia) Al-Raed	End of loan	
30 June 2022	MF	46	(Saudi Arabia) Abdulrahman Al-Dakheel	(Saudi Arabia) Al-Diriyah	End of loan	
30 June 2022	MF	55	(Saudi Arabia) Hamad Al-Abdan	(Saudi Arabia) Al-Hazem	End of loan	
30 June 2022	MF	–	(Saudi Arabia) Fawaz Al-Torais	(Saudi Arabia) Al-Fayha	End of loan	
30 June 2022	FW	10	(Argentina) Luciano Vietto	(Saudi Arabia) Al-Shabab	End of loan	
30 June 2022	FW	34	(Saudi Arabia) Turki Al-Mutairi	(Saudi Arabia) Al-Kholood	End of loan	

=== Transfers out ===
Exit date	Position	No.	Player	To club	Fee	Ref.
21 July 2022	DF	–	(Saudi Arabia) Mohammed Al-Nasser	(Saudi Arabia) Najran	Free	
23 July 2022	MF	35	(Saudi Arabia) Mansor Al-Beshe	(Saudi Arabia) Al-Raed	Free	
4 August 2022	GK	50	(Saudi Arabia) Abdullah Al-Bishi	(Saudi Arabia) Al-Shoulla	Free	
12 August 2022	MF	46	(Saudi Arabia) Abdulrahman Al-Dakheel	(Saudi Arabia) Al-Diriyah	Free	
28 August 2022	GK	–	(Saudi Arabia) Abdulmalek Al-Duwaisan	(Saudi Arabia) Al-Bukiryah	Free	
29 August 2022	GK	33	(Saudi Arabia) Abdullah Al-Jadaani	(Saudi Arabia) Al-Ittihad	Free	
31 August 2022	DF	–	(Saudi Arabia) Mohammed Al-Dawsari	(Saudi Arabia) Al-Ettifaq	Free	
6 September 2022	GK	40	(Saudi Arabia) Nawaf Al-Ghamdi	(Saudi Arabia) Jerash	Free	
19 January 2023	DF	39	(Saudi Arabia) Nawaf Al-Mufarrij	(Saudi Arabia) Al-Arabi	Free	

=== Loans out ===
Start date	End date	Position	No.	Player	To club	Fee	Ref.
8 July 2022	End of season	DF	13	(Saudi Arabia) Abdulrahman Al-Obaid	(Saudi Arabia) Al-Ettifaq	None	
20 July 2022	26 August 2022	FW	34	(Saudi Arabia) Turki Al-Mutairi	(Saudi Arabia) Al-Batin	None	
22 July 2022	End of season	MF	44	(Saudi Arabia) Saad Al-Nasser	(Saudi Arabia) Al-Taawoun	None	
20 August 2022	End of season	MF	27	(Saudi Arabia) Fawaz Al-Torais	(Saudi Arabia) Al-Adalah	None	
27 August 2022	End of season	FW	34	(Saudi Arabia) Turki Al-Mutairi	(Saudi Arabia) Al-Taawoun	None	
28 August 2022	End of season	MF	55	(Saudi Arabia) Hamad Al-Abdan	(Saudi Arabia) Al-Khaleej	None	
31 August 2022	End of season	FW	49	(Saudi Arabia) Abdullah Radif	(Saudi Arabia) Al-Taawoun	None	
22 January 2023	End of season	MF	15	(Brazil) Matheus Pereira	(United Arab Emirates) Al-Wahda	None	
27 January 2023	End of season	DF	–	(Saudi Arabia) Bandar Wohaishi	(Saudi Arabia) Al-Jabalain	None	

== Pre-season and friendlies ==
7 August 2022 Friendly	Al-Hilal (Saudi Arabia)	2–1	(Spain) Almería	Burton, England
18:00 BST	Vietto 2'; S. Al-Dawsari 40'	Report	Ramazani 85' (pen.)	Stadium: Pirelli Stadium

12 August 2022 Friendly	Nottingham Forest U23 (England)	1–6	(Saudi Arabia) Al-Hilal	Burton, England
14:00 BST	15'	Report	Marega 36', 55'; Vietto 43'; S. Al-Dawsari 45+1', 47'; Radif 65'	Stadium: St George's Park National Football Centre

16 August 2022 Friendly	Al-Hilal (Saudi Arabia)	2–1	(Saudi Arabia) Al-Shoulla	Riyadh, Saudi Arabia
AST	Ighalo	Report	Piqueti	Stadium: Al-Hilal Club Stadium

19 August 2022 Friendly	Al-Hilal (Saudi Arabia)	3–0	(Saudi Arabia) Al-Batin	Riyadh, Saudi Arabia
20:20 AST	Vietto; Ighalo	Report		Stadium: Al-Hilal Club Stadium

9 September 2022 Lusail Super Cup	Al-Hilal (Saudi Arabia)	1–1 (4–1 p)	(Egypt) Zamalek	Lusail, Qatar
21:00 AST	Ighalo 18'		Zizo 33'	Stadium: Lusail Iconic Stadium; Attendance: 77,000; Referee: Abdulrahman Al-Jassim (Qatar)
	Penalties
	Penalty scored		Penalty missed Penalty scored

8 December 2022 Diriyah Season Cup	Al-Hilal (Saudi Arabia)	0–5	(England) Newcastle United	Riyadh, Saudi Arabia
19:00 AST	Ighalo (yellow card) 53'	Report	Joelinton 7', 43'; Almirón 75', 80'; Stephenson 85'	Stadium: Prince Faisal bin Fahd Stadium; Attendance: 18,700; Referee: Khalid Al-Turais (Saudi Arabia)

19 January 2023 Riyadh Season Cup	Al-Hilal/Al-Nassr stars (Saudi Arabia)	4–5	(France) Paris Saint-Germain	Riyadh, Saudi Arabia
20:00 AST	Ronaldo 34' (pen.), 45+6'; Jang Hyun-soo 56'; Al-Bulaihi (yellow card) 59'; Talisca 90+4'		Messi 3'; Navas (yellow card) 33'; Bernat (red card) 39'; Marquinhos 43'; Neymar (penalty missed) 45+3'; Ramos 53'; Mbappé 60' (pen.); Ekitike 78'	Stadium: King Fahd International Stadium; Attendance: 68,000; Referee: Abdulrahman Al-Jassim (Qatar)

== Competitions ==
=== Overview ===
Competition	Record							
Competition	G	W	D	L	GF	GA	GD	Win %
Pro League	30	17	8	5	54	29	+25	56.67
King Cup	4	3	1	0	9	2	+7	75.00
Champions League	5	3	1	1	12	3	+9	60.00
Super Cup	1	0	0	1	0	1	−1	0.00
Club World Cup	3	1	1	1	7	8	−1	33.33
Total	43	24	11	8	82	43	+39	55.81

Updated to match played 31 May 2023
Source: Competitions

=== Pro League ===
==== League table ====
Pos	Team	Pld	W	D	L	GF	GA	GD	Pts	Qualification or relegation
1	Al-Ittihad (C, Q)	30	22	6	2	60	13	+47	72	Qualified for the AFC Champions League group stage and the 2023 FIFA Club World Cup
2	Al-Nassr	30	20	7	3	63	18	+45	67	Qualified for the AFC Champions League play-off round
3	Al-Hilal (Note: Al-Hilal qualified for the AFC Champions League group stage as the 2022–23 King Cup winners.)	30	17	8	5	54	29	+25	59	Qualified for the AFC Champions League group stage
4	Al-Shabab	30	17	5	8	57	33	+24	56	
5	Al-Taawoun	30	16	7	7	46	34	+12	55	

Updated to match(es) played on 31 May 2023. Source: SPL
Rules for classification: 1) Points; 2) Head-to-head points; 3) Head-to-head goal difference; 4) Total goal difference; 5) Total goals scored; 6) Fair-play points (Note: Head-to-head record is used only after all the matches between the teams in question have been played).
(C) Champions; (Q) Qualified for the phase indicated

==== Results summary ====
Overall								Home						Away					
Pld	W	D	L	GF	GA	GD	Pts	W	D	L	GF	GA	GD	W	D	L	GF	GA	GD
30	17	8	5	54	29	+25	59	9	4	2	31	15	+16	8	4	3	23	14	+9

Last updated: 31 May 2023.
Source: SPL

==== Results by round ====
Round	1	2	3	4	5	6	7	8	9	10	11	12	15^{1}	13	14	19	18^{2}	20	21	16^{3}	17^{4}	22	23	24	25	27	26^{5}	28	29	30
Ground	A	H	A	H	H	A	H	A	H	A	H	A	A	H	H	A	A	H	A	H	H	A	H	A	H	A	H	A	A	H
Result	W	W	W	W	L	D	D	W	W	D	D	W	D	W	W	D	L	W	W	W	W	L	D	L	W	D	W	L	W	W
Position	3	2	2	2	2	5	5	4	3	4	5	3	4	2	2	5	5	4	4	4	3	4	4	4	4	4	4	4	3	3
Points	3	6	9	12	12	13	14	17	20	21	22	25	26	29	32	33	33	36	39	42	45	45	46	46	49	50	53	53	56	59

Updated to match(es) played on 31 May 2023. Source: SPL
A = Away; H = Home; W = Win; D = Draw; L = Loss; P = Postponed
Notes:
- ^{1} Matchday 15 (vs. Al-Raed) was rescheduled.
- ^{2} Matchday 18 (vs. Al-Fateh) was postponed.
- ^{3} Matchday 16 (vs. Al-Khaleej) was postponed due to a schedule conflict with the 2022 FIFA Club World Cup.
- ^{4} Matchday 17 (vs. Al-Fayha) was postponed due to a schedule conflict with the 2022 AFC Champions League knockout stage.
- ^{5} Matchday 26 (vs. Damac) was postponed due to a schedule conflict with the 2023 King Cup final.

==== Matches ====
All times are local, AST (UTC+3).

Win Draw Loss Postponed

25 August 2022 1	Al-Khaleej	0–2	Al-Hilal	Dammam
21:00	Al-Nowaiqi (yellow card) 47'; Al-Sahli (yellow card) 67'	Report	Ighalo 3'; Marega 25'; Carrillo (yellow card) 80'	Stadium: Prince Mohamed bin Fahd Stadium; Attendance: 13,218; Referee: Majed Al-Shamrani

31 August 2022 2	Al-Hilal	2–0	Al-Fayha	Riyadh
21:00	Cuéllar (yellow card) 37'; Jahfali (yellow card) 48'; Marega 69'; Ighalo 86'	Report	Al-Khaibari (yellow card) 29'; Ryller (yellow card) 57'	Stadium: Prince Faisal bin Fahd Stadium; Attendance: 11,215; Referee: Sandro Schärer (Switzerland)

4 September 2022 3	Al-Fateh	0–1	Al-Hilal	Al-Hasa
18:35		Report	Vietto 11'; N. Al-Dawsari (yellow card) 22'; Cuéllar (yellow card) 71'; Michael (yellow card) 89'	Stadium: Prince Abdullah bin Jalawi Stadium; Attendance: 15,483; Referee: Mohammed Al-Hoaish

16 September 2022 4	Al-Hilal	3–0	Al-Wehda	Riyadh
21:00	Marega 58'; Ighalo 79'; Vietto 89'	Report	Fajr (yellow card) 40'; Al-Rashidi (yellow card) 47'	Stadium: Prince Faisal bin Fahd Stadium; Attendance: 13,585; Referee: Artur Soares Dias (Portugal)

2 October 2022 5	Al-Hilal	1–2	Al-Taawoun	Riyadh
18:20	Michael 29'; N. Al-Dawsari (yellow card) 76'; Marega (yellow card) 90+8'	Report	Al-Nabit 45+6'; Tawamba (yellow card) 56' (yellow-red card) 65'; Al-Rashidi (yellow card) 66', (goal) 74'; Medrán (yellow card) 76'; Al-Omari (yellow card) 90+8'; Kaku (yellow card) 90+10'	Stadium: Prince Faisal bin Fahd Stadium; Attendance: 5,062; Referee: Anastasios Sidiropoulos (Greece)

6 October 2022 6	Al-Ettifaq	0–0	Al-Hilal	Dammam
21:00		Report	Al-Yami (yellow card) 12'; N. Al-Dawsari (yellow card) 30'	Stadium: Prince Mohamed bin Fahd Stadium; Attendance: 11,321; Referee: Sami Al-Jires

10 October 2022 7	Al-Hilal	1–1	Al-Shabab	Riyadh
20:30	Marega 21', (yellow card) 34'; Cuéllar (yellow card) 38'; Al-Juwayr (yellow card) 90+5'	Report	Mina (yellow card) 38'; Carlos 56'	Stadium: Prince Faisal bin Fahd Stadium; Attendance: 14,151; Referee: Eber Aquino (Paraguay)

15 October 2022 8	Al-Tai	2–3	Al-Hilal	Ha'il
18:30	Fai (yellow card) 35'; Musona (yellow card) 52'; Mbenza 57'; Sayoud 64', (yellow card) 74'	Report	Ighalo 39'; Michael 50', (yellow card) 90+2'; Al-Bulaihi 90'	Stadium: Prince Abdul Aziz bin Musa'ed Stadium; Attendance: 9,632; Referee: Mohammed Al-Hoaish

16 December 2022 9	Al-Hilal	3–1	Al-Batin	Riyadh
20:30	Hyun-soo (yellow card) 14', (goal) 48'; Abdulhamid (yellow card) 21'; Ighalo 79'; Carrillo 90+1'	Report	Saad (yellow card) 30'; Y. Al-Shammari (yellow card) 34'; Fawaz (yellow card) 45+6', (goal) 62'	Stadium: Prince Faisal bin Fahd Stadium; Attendance: 4,827; Referee: Sandro Schärer (Switzerland)

26 December 2022 10	Al-Nassr	2–2	Al-Hilal	Riyadh
20:30	Yahya (yellow card) 2'; Al-Khaibari (yellow card) 31'; Talisca 56'; Ghareeb 88'	Report	Ighalo 10'; Cuéllar (yellow card) 39'; S. Al-Dawsari 65' (pen.); Hyun-soo (yellow card) 90+5'	Stadium: Mrsool Park; Attendance: 23,248; Referee: César Ramos (Mexico)

31 December 2022 11	Al-Hilal	2–2	Damac	Riyadh
20:30	Ighalo 38', (yellow card) 45+1'; Al-Malki (yellow card) 48'; Vietto 51'; Otayf (yellow card) 87'	Report	Hassoun (yellow card) 34'; Al-Shammeri 75'; Al-Shahrani (yellow card) 84', (goal) 90+1'	Stadium: Prince Faisal bin Fahd Stadium; Attendance: 4,889; Referee: Srđan Jovanović (Serbia)

5 January 2023 12	Al-Ittihad	0–1	Al-Hilal	Jeddah
20:30	Hamed (yellow card) 31'	Report	Ighalo 12'; Al-Bulaihi (yellow card) 65'; Kanno (yellow card) 67'; Abdulhamid (yellow card) 68'; Al-Malki (yellow card) 90+2'	Stadium: King Abdullah Sports City; Attendance: 53,456; Referee: Daniele Orsato (Italy)

10 January 2023 15	Al-Raed	1–1	Al-Hilal	Buraidah
20:30	Al-Beshe (yellow card) 62'; Sunbul 76'; Salem (yellow card) 89'; Al-Rehaili (yellow card) 90+1'	Report	Al-Yami 24'; Cuéllar (yellow card) 61'	Stadium: King Abdullah Sport City Stadium; Attendance: 19,942; Referee: Sami Al-Jires

15 January 2023 13	Al-Hilal	2–0	Al-Adalah	Riyadh
18:00	S. Al-Dawsari 66' (pen.); Cuéllar (yellow card) 70'; Al-Shehri 73'; Carrillo (yellow card) 90+4'	Report	Al-Harbi (yellow card) 65' (yellow-red card) 85'; Al-Hamdhi (yellow card) 75'; Al-Salem (yellow card) 75'; Al Haydar (yellow card) 90+5'	Stadium: Prince Faisal bin Fahd Stadium; Attendance: 5,154; Referee: Luís Godinho (Portugal)

22 January 2023 14	Al-Hilal	2–1	Abha	Riyadh
18:00	Hyun-soo 21'; Cuéllar (yellow card) 50'; S. Al-Dawsari 54' (pen.); Al-Shehri (yellow card) 58'; Al-Hamdan (yellow card) 90+9'; Abdulhamid (yellow card) 90+12'	Report	Adam 29'; Al Hamsal (yellow card) 52'; Caicedo (yellow card) 80'; Atouchi (yellow card) 90+10'	Stadium: Prince Faisal bin Fahd Stadium; Attendance: 3,714; Referee: Georgi Kabakov (Bulgaria)

2 March 2023 19	Al-Wehda	3–3	Al Hilal	Mecca
20:30	Duarte 24'; Bakshween (yellow card) 29'; Anselmo 57', (yellow card) 90+5'; Al-Akouz (yellow card) 90+2' Al-Sawadi 90+9'	Report	Michael 2'; Ighalo 51'; K. Al-Dawsari (yellow card) 76'; Abdulhamid 90+3'	Stadium: King Abdul Aziz Stadium; Attendance: 28,678; Referee: Faisal Al-Blwi

6 March 2023 18	Al-Hilal	1–2	Al-Fateh	Riyadh
20:30	Al-Hamdan (yellow card) 19'; Al-Breik (yellow card) 31'; Al-Bulaihi (yellow card) 45'; Al-Shehri 90+4'	Report	Al-Khulaif (yellow card) 22'; Tello 39'; Al-Ghannam 80'; Petros (yellow card) 88'; Al-Mousa (yellow card) 90+7'	Stadium: Prince Faisal bin Fahd Stadium; Attendance: 13,815; Referee: Artur Soares Dias (Portugal)

10 March 2023 20	Al-Taawoun	0–4	Al-Hilal	Buraidah
20:30	Abdullah (yellow card) 48'	Report	Ighalo 32', 45+4'; Michael 51'; Al-Bulaihi (yellow card) 54'; Al-Qahtani 90+9'	Stadium: King Abdullah Sport City Stadium; Attendance: 19,478; Referee: Khaled Al-Teris

18 March 2023 21	Al-Hilal	3–0	Al-Ettifaq	Riyadh
20:30	Ighalo 15'; Kanno 34'; Al-Dawsari 90'; Al-Bulaihi (yellow card) 90+5'	Report	Quaison (yellow card) 37'; Al-Ghamdi (yellow card) 57'; Hazazi (yellow card) 65'	Stadium: Prince Faisal bin Fahd Stadium; Attendance: 8,896; Referee: Daniele Orsato (Italy)

1 April 2023 16	Al-Hilal	2–0	Al-Khaleej	Riyadh
22:00	Kanno (yellow card) 16'; Ighalo 39', 45+6' (pen.)	Report	Anthony (yellow card) 45+5'; Al-Samiri (yellow card) 80'	Stadium: Prince Faisal bin Fahd Stadium; Attendance: 7,662; Referee: João Pinheiro (Portugal)

4 April 2023 17	Al-Fayha	0–2	Al-Hilal	Al Majma'ah
22:00	Al-Shuwaish (yellow card) 76'	Report	Ighalo 45+1', 90+2'; K. Al-Dawsari (yellow card) 52'	Stadium: Al Majma'ah Sports City; Attendance: 6,105; Referee: Abdullah Al-Kharbosh

7 April 2023 22	Al-Shabab	3–0	Al-Hilal	Riyadh
22:00	Al-Qahtani 55'; Guanca 68'; Boupendza (yellow card) 79'; Bahebri 90+7'	Report	Ighalo (yellow card) 35'; Cuéllar (red card) 76'; Jang Hyun-soo (yellow card) 80'	Stadium: Prince Faisal bin Fahd Stadium; Attendance: 7,355; Referee: Majed Al-Shamrani

10 April 2023 23	Al-Hilal	2–2	Al-Tai	Riyadh
22:00	Al-Shehri 57'; Michael 72'	Report	Mbenza 25'; Sayoud 35'; Braga (yellow card) 61'; Al-Qumairi (yellow card) 71'; Qassem (yellow card) 89'; Majrashi (yellow card) 90+5'	Stadium: Prince Faisal bin Fahd Stadium; Attendance: 6,081; Referee: Georgi Kabakov (Bulgaria)

14 April 2023 24	Al-Batin	1–0	Al-Hilal	Hafar al-Batin
22:00	López 47', (yellow card) 90+3'; Al-Yousef (yellow card) 50'; Campaña (yellow card) 90+6'	Report	Jahfali (yellow card) 38'; Al-Hadhood (yellow card) 51'; Marega (yellow card) 90+7'	Stadium: Al-Batin Club Stadium; Attendance: 3,517; Referee: Faisal Al-Blwi

18 April 2023 25	Al-Hilal	2–0	Al-Nassr	Riyadh
22:00	Ighalo 42' (pen.), 62' (pen.); Jang Hyun-soo (yellow card) 46'; Cuéllar (yellow card) 64'; Jahfali (yellow card) 90+14'	Report	Yahya (yellow card) 45+2'; Ronaldo (yellow card) 57'; Talisca (yellow card) 70'; González (yellow card) 90+13'	Stadium: King Fahd International Stadium; Attendance: 24,674; Referee: Michael Oliver (England)

16 May 2023 27	Al-Hilal	2–2	Al-Ittihad	Riyadh
21:30	Jahfali (yellow card) 14'; Al-Juwayr 41'; Otayf (yellow card) 59'; Michael 90+4', (yellow card) 90+7'	Report	Coronado 8'; Bamsaud 30'; Al-Nashri (yellow card) 61'	Stadium: Prince Faisal bin Fahd Stadium; Attendance: 15,325; Referee: Fernando Rapallini (Argentina)

19 May 2023 26	Damac	0–1	Al-Hilal	Abha
19:00	Bedrane (yellow card) 19'; Munshi (yellow card) 44'; Al-Shamrani (yellow card) 59'	Report	Vietto (yellow card) 4'; K. Al-Dawsari (yellow card) 45+2'; Marega 70'; Al-Wotayan (yellow card) 90+3'	Stadium: Prince Sultan bin Abdul Aziz Stadium; Attendance: 13,413; Referee: Abdullah Al-Harbi

23 May 2023 28	Al-Adalah	2–0	Al-Hilal	Al-Hasa
19:00	Antonsson 23' (pen.), (yellow card) 88'; Godál (yellow card) 45+5'; Al-Alawi (red card) 48'; Eugénio 84', (yellow card) 90+7'	Report	K. Al-Dawsari (yellow card) 42'; Al-Qahtani (yellow card) 66'	Stadium: Prince Abdullah bin Jalawi Stadium; Attendance: 18,009; Referee: Sami Al-Jires

27 May 2023 29	Abha	0–3	Al-Hilal	Abha
21:00	Al-Jumayah (yellow card) 55'; Al-Amri (yellow card) 58'; Atouchi (yellow card) 72'	Report	Al-Qahtani 11'; Ighalo 44'; Al-Hamdan 87', (yellow card) 90+2'	Stadium: Prince Sultan bin Abdul Aziz Stadium; Attendance: 13,422; Referee: Mohammed Al-Esmaiel

31 May 2023 30	Al-Hilal	3–2	Al-Raed	Riyadh
21:00	Al-Juwayr 18'; Al-Qahtani 36'; Otayf 80' (pen.)	Report	Al-Farhan (yellow card) 26'; Al-Fahad (yellow card) 79'; R. Al-Dossari 90'; Pablo 90+5'	Stadium: Prince Faisal bin Fahd Stadium; Attendance: 4,060; Referee: Raed Al-Zahrani

=== King Cup ===
All times are local, AST (UTC+3).

21 December 2022 Round of 16	Al-Hilal	4–0	Al-Ettifaq	Riyadh
18:00	Ighalo 12'; Al-Breik 42'; Vietto 45+5'; Michael 90+3'	Report	F. Al-Ghamdi (yellow card) 27'; Sliti (red card) 40'	Stadium: Prince Faisal bin Fahd Stadium; Attendance: 4,372; Referee: István Kovács (Romania)

14 March 2023 Quarter-finals	Al-Hilal	3–1	Al-Fateh	Riyadh
21:00	Kanno 17' (pen.); Al-Bulaihi (yellow card) 26' (yellow-red card) 67'; Michael 48'; Cuéllar (yellow card) 76'; Ighalo 84'	Report	Al-Najdi (yellow card) 12'; Al-Buraikan 27'; Vélez (yellow card) 35'; Saâdane (yellow card) 76'	Stadium: Prince Faisal bin Fahd Stadium; Attendance: 12,023; Referee: Radu Petrescu (Romania)

23 April 2023 Semi-finals	Al-Ittihad	0–1 (a.e.t.)	Al-Hilal	Jeddah
21:00	O. Hawsawi (yellow card) 88'	Report	Al-Shahrani (yellow card) 44'; Al-Breik (yellow card) 71'; Abdulhamid (yellow card) 90+12'; Cuéllar (yellow card) 104'; Hegazi 106' (o.g.)	Stadium: King Abdullah Sports City; Attendance: 53,642; Referee: Danny Makkelie (Netherlands)

12 May 2023 Final	Al-Hilal	1–1 (a.e.t.) (7–6 p)	Al-Wehda	Jeddah
21:00	Al-Breik (yellow card) 42'; N. Al-Dawsari (yellow card) 71'; Ighalo (yellow card) 80'; Al-Bulaihii 90+9'; Al-Juwayr (penalty missed) 96'; Jang Hyun-soo (yellow card) 112'	Report	Noor (yellow card) 31'; Yoda 35'; Al Hejji (yellow card) 51'; Al-Jayzani (yellow card) 95'	Stadium: King Abdullah Sports City; Attendance: 52,320; Referee: Szymon Marciniak (Poland)
	Penalties
	Carrillo (penalty missed); Ighalo (penalty missed); Al-Shehri (penalty scored); Al-Juwayr (penalty scored); Al-Hamdan (penalty scored); N. Al-Dawsari (penalty scored); Abdulhamid (penalty scored); Jang Hyun-soo (penalty scored); Al-Mayouf (penalty scored)		(penalty missed) Beauguel; (penalty scored) Bukhari; (penalty missed) Al Hejji; (penalty scored) Duarte; (penalty scored) Fajr; (penalty scored) Al-Naji; (penalty scored) Makki; (penalty scored) Kurdi; (penalty missed) Al-Ghamdi

=== Super Cup ===
All times are local, AST (UTC+3).

26 January 2023 Semi-finals	Al-Fayha	1–0	Al-Hilal	Riyadh
18:00	Paulinho 20', (yellow card) 82'; Stojković (yellow card) 27'; Al-Khaibari (yellow card) 90+5'	Report	Al-Bulaihi (yellow card) 66'; Abdulhamid (yellow card) 68'	Stadium: Prince Faisal bin Fahd Stadium; Attendance: 9,020; Referee: Szymon Marciniak (Poland)

=== AFC Champions League ===
==== Knockout phase ====
20 February 2023 Round of 16	Al-Hilal (Saudi Arabia)	3–1	(United Arab Emirates) Shabab Al Ahli	Al Wakrah, Qatar
22:00 UTC+3	Ighalo 17'; Abdulhamid (yellow card) 45+1'; Jang Hyun-soo 73'; Vietto 79'	Report	Khribin (yellow card) 46', (goal) 86'; Naser (yellow card) 81'	Stadium: Al Janoub Stadium; Attendance: 7,825; Referee: Fu Ming (China)

23 February 2023 Quarter-finals	Foolad (Iran)	0–1	(Saudi Arabia) Al-Hilal	Al Wakrah, Qatar
21:00 UTC+3	Abshak (yellow card) 78'; Vasei (yellow card) 84'	Report	Al-Bulaihi (yellow card) 29'; Kanno (yellow card) 60'; Marega 87'	Stadium: Al Janoub Stadium; Attendance: 14,173; Referee: Hiroyuki Kimura (Japan)

26 February 2023 Semi-finals	Al-Duhail (Qatar)	0–7	(Saudi Arabia) Al-Hilal	Doha, Qatar
18:00 UTC+3	Luiz Júnior (yellow card) 21'	Report	Ighalo 2', 10', 48', 62'; Marega 14', 27'; S. Al-Dawsari 38'; Al-Mayouf (yellow card) 54'	Stadium: Al Thumama Stadium; Attendance: 16,320; Referee: Ko Hyung-jin (South Korea)

29 April 2023 Final; First leg	Al-Hilal (Saudi Arabia)	1–1	(Japan) Urawa Red Diamonds	Riyadh, Saudi Arabia
20:30 UTC+3	S. Al-Dawsari 13', (red card) 86'	Report	Koroki 53'; Ito (yellow card) 85'; Iwao (yellow card) 86'	Stadium: King Fahd International Stadium; Attendance: 50,881; Referee: Ahmed Al-Kaf (Oman)

6 May 2023 Final; Second leg	Urawa Red Diamonds (Japan)	1–0 (2–1 agg.)	(Saudi Arabia) Al-Hilal	Saitama, Japan
18:00 UTC+9	Okubo (yellow card) 36'; Carrillo 48' (o.g.)	Report	Al-Bulaihi (yellow card) 88'	Stadium: Saitama Stadium 2002; Attendance: 53,374; Referee: Ma Ning (China)

=== FIFA Club World Cup ===
4 February 2023 Second round	Wydad AC (Morocco)	1–1 (3–5 p)	(Saudi Arabia) Al-Hilal	Rabat, Morocco
15:30 WAT (UTC+1)	Jaadi (yellow card) 10'; El Amloud 52'; Zé (yellow card) 57'; Daoudi (yellow card) 58'; Jabrane (yellow card) 89' (yellow-red card) 90+1'; Ounajem (yellow card) 90+1'	Report	Al-Bulaihi (yellow card) 10'; Kanno (yellow card) 56', (goal) 90+4' (pen.), (yellow-red card) 94'; S. Al-Dawsari (yellow card) 56'; Al-Shehri (yellow card) 117'; Al-Hamdan (yellow card) 120+7'	Stadium: Prince Moulay Abdellah Stadium; Attendance: 43,891; Referee: Iván Barton (El Salvador)
	Penalties
	Attiyat Allah (penalty missed); El Amloud (penalty scored); Ounajem (penalty scored); Daoudi (penalty scored)		(penalty scored) Marega; (penalty scored) Vietto; (penalty scored) Al-Shehri; (penalty scored) Al-Hamdan; (penalty scored) Al-Juwayr

7 February 2023 Semi-finals	Flamengo (Brazil)	2–3	(Saudi Arabia) Al-Hilal	Tangier, Morocco
20:00 WAT (UTC+1)	Gerson (yellow card) 15' (yellow-red card) 45+8'; Gabriel (yellow card) 17'; Pedro 20', 90+1', (yellow card) 90+8'; David Luiz (yellow card) 42'; Pulgar (yellow card) 56'; Thiago Maia (yellow card) 72'	Report	S. Al-Dawsari 4' (pen.), 45+9' (pen.); Vietto (yellow card) 42', (goal) 70'; K. Al-Dawsari (yellow card) 62'; Jahfali (yellow card) 89'	Stadium: Ibn Batouta Stadium; Attendance: 42,496; Referee: István Kovács (Romania)

11 February 2023 Final	Real Madrid (Spain)	5–3	(Saudi Arabia) Al-Hilal	Rabat, Morocco
20:00 WAT (UTC+1)	Vinícius 13', 69'; Valverde 18', 58'; Benzema 54'	Report	Marega 26'; Vietto 63', 79'	Stadium: Prince Moulay Abdellah Stadium; Attendance: 44,439; Referee: Anthony Taylor (England)

== Statistics ==
=== Appearances ===
Last updated on 31 May 2023.

No.	Pos	Nat	Player	Total		Pro League		King Cup		Champions League		Super Cup		Club World Cup	
No.	Pos	Nat	Player	Apps	Goals	Apps	Goals	Apps	Goals	Apps	Goals	Apps	Goals	Apps	Goals
Goalkeepers
1	GK	(Saudi Arabia) KSA	Abdullah Al-Mayouf	36	0	23	0	4	0	5	0	1	0	3	0
21	GK	(Saudi Arabia) KSA	Mohammed Al-Owais	5	0	5	0	0	0	0	0	0	0	0	0
31	GK	(Saudi Arabia) KSA	Habib Al-Wotayan	2	0	2	0	0	0	0	0	0	0	0	0
60	GK	(Saudi Arabia) KSA	Ahmed Al-Jubaya	1	0	0+1	0	0	0	0	0	0	0	0	0
Defenders
2	DF	(Saudi Arabia) KSA	Mohammed Al-Breik	25	1	13+4	0	2+2	1	2+2	0	0	0	0	0
4	DF	(Saudi Arabia) KSA	Khalifah Al-Dawsari	17	0	9+2	0	1+1	0	1+1	0	0	0	2	0
5	DF	(Saudi Arabia) KSA	Ali Al-Bulaihi	33	2	22	1	2	1	5	0	1	0	3	0
12	DF	(Saudi Arabia) KSA	Yasser Al-Shahrani	10	0	5+3	0	2	0	0	0	0	0	0	0
20	DF	(South Korea) KOR	Jang Hyun-soo	30	3	17+1	2	3	0	5	1	1	0	3	0
32	DF	(Saudi Arabia) KSA	Muteb Al-Mufarrij	0	0	0	0	0	0	0	0	0	0	0	0
42	DF	(Saudi Arabia) KSA	Muath Faqeehi	5	0	1+3	0	0+1	0	0	0	0	0	0	0
66	DF	(Saudi Arabia) KSA	Saud Abdulhamid	39	1	23+4	1	2+1	0	4+1	0	1	0	3	0
67	DF	(Saudi Arabia) KSA	Mohammed Al-Khaibari	0	0	0	0	0	0	0	0	0	0	0	0
70	DF	(Saudi Arabia) KSA	Mohammed Jahfali	18	0	13+2	0	2	0	0	0	0	0	0+1	0
88	DF	(Saudi Arabia) KSA	Hamad Al-Yami	16	1	7+2	1	2	0	2+3	0	0	0	0	0
Midfielders
6	MF	(Colombia) COL	Gustavo Cuéllar	31	0	24	0	2	0	1	0	1	0	3	0
7	MF	(Saudi Arabia) KSA	Salman Al-Faraj	14	0	7+1	0	2	0	3+1	0	0	0	0	0
8	MF	(Saudi Arabia) KSA	Abdullah Otayf	17	1	4+6	1	1+1	0	1+4	0	0	0	0	0
16	MF	(Saudi Arabia) KSA	Nasser Al-Dawsari	31	0	12+10	0	0+2	0	2+1	0	1	0	1+2	0
19	MF	(Peru) PER	André Carrillo	39	1	25+5	1	4	0	1	0	1	0	2+1	0
26	MF	(Saudi Arabia) KSA	Abdulellah Al-Malki	4	0	1+2	0	1	0	0	0	0	0	0	0
28	MF	(Saudi Arabia) KSA	Mohamed Kanno	31	3	13+6	1	3+1	1	5	0	1	0	2	1
29	MF	(Saudi Arabia) KSA	Salem Al-Dawsari	24	8	12+2	4	1+1	0	4	2	1	0	3	2
39	MF	(Saudi Arabia) KSA	Suhaib Al-Zaid	2	0	1+1	0	0	0	0	0	0	0	0	0
43	MF	(Saudi Arabia) KSA	Musab Al-Juwayr	15	2	7+5	2	0+1	0	0+1	0	0	0	0+1	0
56	MF	(Saudi Arabia) KSA	Mohammed Al-Qahtani	6	3	2+4	3	0	0	0	0	0	0	0	0
57	MF	(Saudi Arabia) KSA	Nasser Al-Hadhood	1	0	1	0	0	0	0	0	0	0	0	0
96	MF	(Brazil) BRA	Michael	36	8	16+9	6	3+1	2	3	0	0+1	0	1+2	0
Forwards
9	FW	(Nigeria) NGR	Odion Ighalo	38	26	24+3	19	3+1	2	4	5	0	0	2+1	0
10	FW	(Argentina) ARG	Luciano Vietto	29	8	13+7	3	2+1	1	2	1	0+1	0	2+1	3
11	FW	(Saudi Arabia) KSA	Saleh Al-Shehri	30	3	4+17	3	0+3	0	0+4	0	1	0	0+1	0
14	FW	(Saudi Arabia) KSA	Abdullah Al-Hamdan	27	1	3+15	1	0+2	0	1+3	0	1	0	0+2	0
17	FW	(Mali) MLI	Moussa Marega	32	9	17+5	5	2	0	4	3	0+1	0	3	1
Players sent out on loan this season
15	MF	(Brazil) BRA	Matheus Pereira	8	0	4+3	0	0+1	0	0	0	0	0	0	0

=== Goalscorers ===
Rank	No.	Pos	Nat	Name	Pro League	King Cup	Champions League	Super Cup	Club World Cup	Total
1	9	FW	(Nigeria)	Odion Ighalo	19	2	5	0	0	26
2	17	FW	(Mali)	Moussa Marega	5	0	3	0	1	9
3	10	FW	(Argentina)	Luciano Vietto	3	1	1	0	3	8
3	29	MF	(Saudi Arabia)	Salem Al-Dawsari	4	0	2	0	2	8
3	96	MF	(Brazil)	Michael	6	2	0	0	0	8
6	11	FW	(Saudi Arabia)	Saleh Al-Shehri	3	0	0	0	0	3
6	20	DF	(South Korea)	Jang Hyun-soo	2	0	1	0	0	3
6	28	MF	(Saudi Arabia)	Mohamed Kanno	1	1	0	0	1	3
6	56	MF	(Saudi Arabia)	Mohammed Al-Qahtani	3	0	0	0	0	3
10	5	DF	(Saudi Arabia)	Ali Al Bulaihi	1	1	0	0	0	2
10	43	MF	(Saudi Arabia)	Musab Al-Juwayr	2	0	0	0	0	2
12	2	DF	(Saudi Arabia)	Mohammed Al-Breik	0	1	0	0	0	1
12	8	MF	(Saudi Arabia)	Abdullah Otayf	1	0	0	0	0	1
12	14	FW	(Saudi Arabia)	Abdullah Al-Hamdan	1	0	0	0	0	1
12	19	MF	(Peru)	André Carrillo	1	0	0	0	0	1
12	66	DF	(Saudi Arabia)	Saud Abdulhamid	1	0	0	0	0	1
12	88	DF	(Saudi Arabia)	Hamad Al-Yami	1	0	0	0	0	1
Own goal					0	1	0	0	0	1
Total					54	9	12	0	7	82

Last Updated: 31 May 2023

=== Assists ===
Rank	No.	Pos	Nat	Name	Pro League	King Cup	Champions League	Super Cup	Club World Cup	Total
1	96	MF	(Brazil)	Michael	5	0	1	0	1	7
2	19	MF	(Peru)	André Carrillo	5	1	0	0	0	6
2	29	MF	(Saudi Arabia)	Salem Al-Dawsari	2	0	3	0	1	6
2	66	DF	(Saudi Arabia)	Saud Abdulhamid	5	0	0	0	1	6
5	7	MF	(Saudi Arabia)	Salman Al-Faraj	4	1	0	0	0	5
6	2	DF	(Saudi Arabia)	Mohammed Al-Breik	2	1	0	0	0	3
7	9	FW	(Nigeria)	Odion Ighalo	2	0	0	0	0	2
7	10	FW	(Argentina)	Luciano Vietto	2	0	0	0	0	2
7	11	FW	(Saudi Arabia)	Saleh Al-Shehri	1	0	1	0	0	2
7	16	MF	(Saudi Arabia)	Nasser Al-Dawsari	1	1	0	0	0	2
7	17	FW	(Mali)	Moussa Marega	0	0	2	0	0	2
7	28	MF	(Saudi Arabia)	Mohamed Kanno	0	0	1	0	1	2
13	1	GK	(Saudi Arabia)	Abdullah Al-Mayouf	0	0	1	0	0	1
13	4	DF	(Saudi Arabia)	Khalifah Al-Dawsari	0	1	0	0	0	1
13	6	MF	(Colombia)	Gustavo Cuéllar	1	0	0	0	0	1
13	12	DF	(Saudi Arabia)	Yasser Al-Shahrani	1	0	0	0	0	1
13	14	FW	(Saudi Arabia)	Abdullah Al-Hamdan	0	0	1	0	0	1
13	20	DF	(South Korea)	Jang Hyun-soo	1	0	0	0	0	1
13	43	MF	(Saudi Arabia)	Musab Al-Juwayr	1	0	0	0	0	1
13	70	DF	(Saudi Arabia)	Mohammed Jahfali	1	0	0	0	0	1
Total					34	5	10	0	4	53

Last Updated: 31 May 2023

=== Clean sheets ===
Rank	No.	Pos	Nat	Name	Pro League	King Cup	Champions League	Super Cup	Club World Cup	Total
1	1	GK	(Saudi Arabia)	Abdullah Al-Mayouf	12	2	2	0	0	16
2	21	GK	(Saudi Arabia)	Mohammed Al-Owais	1	0	0	0	0	1
2	31	GK	(Saudi Arabia)	Habib Al-Wotayan	1	0	0	0	0	1
Total					14	2	2	0	0	18

Last Updated: 27 May 2023
