= Abdulaziz Al-Jamaan =

Saudi Arabian footballer

Personal information
- Date of birth: February 1, 1996 (age 30)
- Place of birth: Saudi Arabia
- Height: 1.76 m (5 ft 9 1/2 in)
- Positions: Winger; right-back

Team information
- Current team: Al-Adalah
- Number: 29

Youth career
- 2009–2017: Al-Hilal

Senior career*
Years	Team	Apps	(Gls)
2017–2018	Al-Hilal	0	(0)
2017–2018	→ Al-Raed (loan)	8	(0)
2018–2020	Al-Jabalain	32	(1)
2020–2021	Abha	3	(0)
2021–2023	Al-Adalah	72	(3)
2023–2024	Al-Faisaly	4	(0)
2024–2025	Al-Kawkab		
2025–	Al-Adalah	0	(0)
- * Club domestic league appearances and goals as of 9 September 2020

Abdulaziz Al-Jamaan (Arabic: عَبْد الْعَزِيز مُحَيْسِن الْجُمْعَان الدَّوْسَرِيّ, born 1 February 1996) is a Saudi Arabian professional footballer who plays for Al-Adalah as a winger.

== Career ==
Abdulaziz Mohaisen Al-Jamaan is the son of former Al-Nassr player and Saudi international Mohaisen Al-Jam'an. He started his career with the youth team of Al-Hilal when his father registered him at the club in 2009. A decision which sparked controversy among the Al-Nassr fans who did not appreciate Al-Jamaan joining their local rivals. On 31 August 2016, Al-Jamaan signed a 3-year professional contract with Al-Hilal. On 14 July 2017, Al-Jamaan joined Al-Raed on a season-long loan. He made 9 appearances in all competitions and scored no goals. On 19 November 2018, Al-Jamaan left Al-Hilal and joined MS League side Al-Jabalain. On 31 January 2020, Al-Jamaan left Al-Jabalain and joined Pro League side Abha. On 2 February 2021, Al-Jamaan joined Al-Adalah. With Al-Adalah, Al-Jamaan achieved promotion to the Pro League during the 2021–22 season. On 1 July 2022, Al-Jamaan renewed his contract with Al-Adalah. On 16 July 2023, Al-Jamaan joined Al-Faisaly. On 11 September 2025, Al-Jamaan returned to Al-Adalah.

== Career statistics ==
=== Club ===
As of match played 31 May 2022

Club	Season	League			King Cup		Asia		Other		Total	
Club	Season	Division	Apps	Goals	Apps	Goals	Apps	Goals	Apps	Goals	Apps	Goals
Al-Raed (loan)	2017–18	Pro League	8	0	1	0	—		1 (Note: Appearance in Crown Prince Cup)	0	10	0
Al-Jabalain	2018–19	MS League	12	0	0	0	—		—		12	0
Al-Jabalain	2019–20	MS League	20	1	1	0	—		—		21	1
Al-Jabalain	Al-Jabalain Total		32	1	1	0	0	0	0	0	33	1
Abha	2019–20	Pro League	3	0	0	0	—		—		3	0
Abha	2020–21	Pro League	0	0	1	0	—		—		1	0
Abha	Abha Total		3	0	1	0	0	0	0	0	4	0
Al-Adalah	2020–21	MS League	18	2	—		—		—		18	2
Al-Adalah	2021–22	FD League	30	1	—		—		—		30	1
Al-Adalah	2022–23	Pro League	24	0	1	0	—		—		25	0
Al-Adalah	Al-Adalah Total		72	3	1	0	0	0	0	0	73	3
Career totals			115	4	4	0	0	0	1	0	120	4
