= Fawaz Al-Torais =

Saudi Arabian footballer (born 1997)

Personal information
- Full name: Fawaz Awadh Al-Torais
- Date of birth: 24 April 1997 (age 29)
- Place of birth: Khobar, Saudi Arabia
- Height: 1.71 m (5 ft 7 in)
- Position: Winger

Team information
- Current team: Al-Jabalain
- Number: 8

Youth career
- 2013–2018: Al-Ettifaq

Senior career*
Years	Team	Apps	(Gls)
2017–2020	Al-Ettifaq	19	(1)
2018–2019	→ Al-Khaleej (loan)	31	(3)
2020–2023	Al-Hilal	4	(0)
2021–2022	→ Al-Fayha (loan)	11	(1)
2022–2023	→ Al-Adalah (loan)	5	(1)
2023–2024	Al-Khaleej	17	(1)
2024–2025	Al-Orobah	19	(0)
2025–	Al-Jabalain	0	(0)

International career^{‡}
2015–2017	Saudi Arabia U20		
2018–2021	Saudi Arabia U23		
- * Club domestic league appearances and goals as of November 30, 2022 ‡ National team caps and goals as of September 21, 2019

Fawaz Al-Torais (Arabic: فواز الطريس; born 24 April 1997) is a Saudi Arabian football player who plays as a winger for Al-Jabalain.

== Career ==
Al-Torais is an academy graduate of Al-Ettifaq and signed his first professional contract with the club on September 5, 2016. He made his debut for the first team on November 16, 2017, during the league match against Ohod. On June 2, 2018, Al-Torais was loaned to the MS League side Al-Khaleej for the 2018–19 season. On October 14, 2020, Al-Torais signed with Al-Hilal. On 24 August 2021, he joined Al-Fayha on loan. On 20 August 2022, he joined the newly promoted side Al-Adalah on loan. On 18 July 2023, Al-Torais joined Al-Khaleej on a free transfer. On 14 July 2024, Al-Torais joined Al-Orobah on a one-year deal. In September 2025, Al-Torais joined Al-Jabalain.

== Career statistics ==
=== Club ===
As of match played 27 May 2024

Appearances and goals by club, season and competition
Club	Season	League			King Cup		Asia		Other		Total	
Club	Season	Division	Apps	Goals	Apps	Goals	Apps	Goals	Apps	Goals	Apps	Goals
Al-Ettifaq	2017–18	Pro League	3	0	0	0	—		—		3	0
Al-Ettifaq	2019–20	Pro League	16	1	3	0	—		—		19	1
Al-Ettifaq	Total		19	1	3	0	0	0	0	0	22	1
Al-Khaleej (loan)	2018–19	MS League	31	3	2	1	—		1 (Note: Appearance in Pro League play-offs)	0	34	4
Al-Hilal	2020–21	Pro League	4	0	0	0	4	0	0	0	8	0
Al-Fayha (loan)	2021–22	Pro League	11	1	2	0	—		—		13	1
Al-Adalah (loan)	2022–23	Pro League	5	1	0	0	—		—		5	1
Al-Khaleej	2023–24	Pro League	17	1	4	1	—		—		21	2
Career total			87	7	11	2	4	0	1	0	103	9

== Honours ==
Al-Hilal

- Saudi Professional League: 2020–21
- King Cup: 2019–20

Al-Fayha

- King Cup: 2021–22
