= Anderson Plata =

Colombian footballer (born 1990)

Personal information
- Full name: Anderson Daniel Plata Guillén
- Date of birth: 8 November 1990 (age 36)
- Place of birth: Villanueva, Colombia
- Height: 1.72 m (5 ft 7 1/2 in)
- Position: Forward

Team information
- Current team: Águilas Doradas
- Number: 7

Senior career*
Years	Team	Apps	(Gls)
2011	Valledupar	19	(7)
2011–2014	Deportivo Pereira	56	(17)
2013	→ Daejeon Citizen (loan)	21	(1)
2014	→ Millonarios (loan)	16	(1)
2015	Atlético Huila	20	(2)
2016–2018	Santa Fe	79	(15)
2018–2019	Atletico Paranaense	3	(0)
2019–2022	Deportes Tolima	85	(19)
2022–2023	Al-Adalah	6	(2)
2023	Al-Jabalain	15	(5)
2023–2024	Independiente Medellín	38	(3)
2024	Deportivo Cali	15	(1)
2025–	Águilas Doradas	8	(0)
- * Club domestic league appearances and goals as of 12 December 2025

Anderson Daniel Plata Guillén (born 8 November 1990) is a Colombian footballer who plays as forward for Águilas Doradas.

== Career ==
Plata began his career with second division club Valledupar in 2011. In September 2011, he transferred to Deportivo Pereira, playing three seasons there until moving to South Korean outfit Daejeon Citizen on 19 June 2013, where he made 21 appearances but only scored once. In January 2014, he moved back to Colombia and joined Millonarios on a one-year loan deal with an option to permanent switch for a further year. In 2015, he played with Atlético Huila.

In June 2016, he joined Independiente Santa Fe. On 10 August 2016, Plata played 15 minutes as he won his first title with Santa Fe, the Suruga Bank Championship against Kashima Antlers. He scored two goals in the playoffs against Independiente Medellín and Atlético Nacional to help guide Santa Fe into the final of the 2016 Finalizacion tournament, which they won against Deportes Tolima for Plata's first league title in his career, and second with Santa Fe. In 2017, Santa Fe made the final again, in the Torneo Finalizacion, but lost to Millonarios. In August 2018, Plata left Santa Fe.

On 16 August 2018, he joined Athletico Paranaense on a one-year contract. In December, Paranaense won the Copa Sudamericana, but Plata wasn't able to play because he already played part of the competition with Santa Fe. His spell at the Brazilian club was short-lived and under expectations, only playing 8 games without scoring any goals, mainly due to an injury he suffered. In June 2019, he joined Deportes Tolima. In June 2021, he won his first title with Tolima, playing in both legs of the victory against Millonarios in the final of the league.

On 8 August 2022, Plata joined Saudi Pro League club Al-Adalah on a two-year deal. On 25 January 2023, Plata was released from his contract. On 30 January 2023, Plata joined Saudi First Division League side Al-Jabalain.

On 7 July 2023, Plata joined Independiente Medellín.

== Style of play ==
Anderson Plata likes to take advantage of his speed and dribbling, which has developed him into a winger that likes to take on defenders. However, he has been criticized for his decision making sometimes, as he would make passes at the wrong time or have poor accuracy when taking shots, although he improved these things as he aged.

== Honours ==
=== Independiente Santa Fe ===
- Categoría Primera A: 2016-II
- Suruga Bank Championship: 2016

=== Atlético Paranaense ===
- Copa Sudamericana: 2016

=== Deportes Tolima ===
- Categoria Primera A: 2021-I
