= Mohammed Al-Oufi =

Saudi Arabian footballer (born 2002)

Mohammed Al-Oufi محمد العوفي
Personal information
- Full name: Mohammed Awadh Al-Oufi
- Date of birth: 8 August 2002 (age 24)
- Place of birth: Jeddah, Saudi Arabia
- Height: 1.76 m (5 ft 9 in)
- Position: Left-back

Youth career
- –2020: Al-Ittihad

Senior career*
Years	Team	Apps	(Gls)
2020–2023	Al-Ittihad	8	(0)
2022–2023	→ Al-Adalah (loan)	24	(1)
2023–2026	Abha	39	(0)

International career
2020–2022	Saudi Arabia U20		
2022–2023	Saudi Arabia U23		
Medal record
Men's football
Representing Saudi Arabia
Islamic Solidarity Games
Silver medal – second place	2021 Konya
- * Club domestic league appearances and goals as of 16 May 2023

Mohammed Awadh Al-Oufi (Arabic: محمد العوفي; born 8 August 2002) is a Saudi Arabian footballer who plays as a left-back.

== Career ==
On 18 August 2022, Al-Oufi joined Pro League side Al-Adalah on a season long loan from Al-Ittihad.

On 28 July 2023, Al-Oufi joined Abha on a three-year deal.
