= Koffi Kouamé =

Ivorian footballer

Personal information
- Full name: Koffi Constant Kouamé
- Date of birth: September 28, 1995 (age 31)
- Place of birth: Bondoukou, Ivory Coast
- Height: 1.82 m (6 ft 0 in)
- Position: Defender

Team information
- Current team: Al-Adalah
- Number: 33

Senior career*
Years	Team	Apps	(Gls)
2012–2017	ASEC Mimosas		
2017–2018	AS Tanda		
2018–2019	SC Gagnoa		
2019–2020	FC San-Pédro		
2020–2023	AS Rejiche	23	(0)
2023–2025	CS Sfaxien	44	(0)
2025–2026	Naft Maysan SC		
2026–	Al-Adalah	10	(0)

International career
2019	Ivory Coast	2	(0)
- * Club domestic league appearances and goals

Koffi Constant Kouamé (born 28 September 1995) is an Ivorian who plays for Al-Adalah as a defender.
