= Edson (footballer, born 1991) =

Brazilian footballer

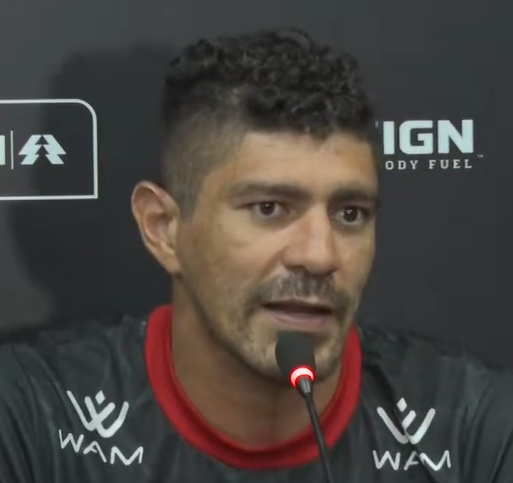
- Edson in 2022

Personal information
- Full name: Edson Felipe da Cruz
- Date of birth: 1 July 1991 (age 35)
- Place of birth: Touros, Brazil
- Height: 1.83 m (6 ft 0 in)
- Positions: Centre-back; defensive midfielder

Team information
- Current team: ABC

Youth career
- 2008–2011: ABC
- 2010: → Atlético Mineiro (loan)
- 2011: → Grêmio (loan)

Senior career*
Years	Team	Apps	(Gls)
2009–2013	ABC	43	(4)
2011–2012	→ Grêmio (loan)	0	(0)
2012	→ Treze (loan)	0	(0)
2014	Coimbra	0	(0)
2014	→ São Bernardo (loan)	9	(1)
2014	→ Fluminense (loan)	17	(3)
2015–2016	Fluminense	68	(5)
2017–2018	Bahia	33	(1)
2019	Ponte Preta	37	(3)
2020	Atlético Goianiense	22	(1)
2020–2021	Al-Qadsiah	21	(1)
2022	Atlético Goianiense	27	(0)
2022–2023	Al-Adalah	17	(0)
2024	Goiás	29	(2)
2025	Botafogo-SP	26	(0)
2026–	ABC	24	(5)
- * Club domestic league appearances and goals as of 18 November 2026

Edson Felipe da Cruz (born 1 July 1991) is a Brazilian professional footballer who plays as either a centre-back or a defensive midfielder for ABC.

== Club career ==
Born in Touros, Rio Grande do Norte, Edson graduated with ABC's youth setup. He made his professional debut on 28 August 2009, coming on as a second-half substitute in a 0–1 away loss against Figueirense for the Série B championship.

After being rarely used Edson joined Treze on 12 July 2012, on loan until the end of the year. He eventually returned to his parent club in January 2013, being regularly used during the campaign and scoring his first goal on 10 September, netting the first in a 4–2 home win against Sport.

On 11 December 2013 Edson rescinded with ABC, and signed for São Bernardo. On 25 April 2014 he was loaned to Série A club Fluminense until May 2015, with a buyout clause.

Edson made his debut in the main category of Brazilian football on 9 August 2014, replacing Bruno in the 64th minute of a 1–1 home draw against Coritiba. He scored his first goal in the division on 22 October 2014, netting the game's only in an away win against Santos.

Edson finished the season with 17 appearances and three goals, overtaking Edwin Valencia in the latter stages of the championship.

On 20 July 2022, Edson joined Saudi Arabian club Al-Adalah.

== Honours ==
Bahia

- Copa do Nordeste: 2017

Atlético Goianiense

- Campeonato Goiano: 2022
