= Waleed Al-Shangeati =

Saudi Arabian footballer

Personal information
- Full name: Waleed Balkhair Suwailek Al-Shangeati
- Date of birth: 9 January 1994 (age 32)
- Place of birth: Saudi Arabia
- Height: 1.80 m (5 ft 11 in)
- Position: Striker

Team information
- Current team: Al-Raed
- Number: 11

Youth career
- –2013: Ohod
- 2013–2016: Al-Shabab

Senior career*
Years	Team	Apps	(Gls)
2016–2017	Al-Shabab	0	(0)
2016–2017	→ Najran (loan)	21	(5)
2017–2022	Al-Qadsiah	39	(6)
2018–2019	→ Al-Washm (loan)	27	(5)
2019–2020	→ Najran (loan)	18	(4)
2022–2024	Al-Adalah	43	(12)
2024	Ohod	13	(0)
2024–2025	Al-Batin	27	(8)
2025–	Al-Raed	0	(0)
- * Club domestic league appearances and goals as of 31 May 2022

Waleed Al-Shangeati (Arabic: وليد الشنقيطي, born 9 January 1994) is a Saudi Arabian professional footballer who plays as a striker for Al-Raed.

== Career ==
Al-Shangeati began his career at the youth team of Ohod. On 30 January 2013, Al-Shangeati left Ohod and joined the U23 team of Al-Shabab. On 4 August 2016, Al-Shangeati joined Najran on a season-long loan. On 20 June 2017, Al-Shangeati joined Al-Qadsiah on a five-year deal. On 12 July 2018, Al-Shangeati joined Al-Washm on loan. On 29 July 2019, Al-Shangeati returned to Najran for a second loan spell. On 20 January 2020, Al-Shangeati was recalled from his loan by Al-Qadsiah. He scored two goals in 10 appearances as Al-Qadsiah earned promotion to the Pro League. On 16 January 2022, Al-Shangeati joined Al-Adalah. He scored three goals in 18 appearances for the club and helped them achieve promotion to the Pro League. On 21 January 2024, Al-Shangeati joined Ohod. On 12 September 2024, Al-Shangeati joined Al-Batin. On 5 September 2025, Al-Shangeati joined Al-Raed.

== Honours ==
Al-Qadsiah

- First Division runner-up: 2019–20

Al-Adalah

- First Division runner-up: 2021–22
