= Mohamed Mkacher =

Tunisian footballer and manager

Personal information
- Date of birth: 25 May 1975 (age 51)
- Place of birth: Sousse, Tunisia
- Height: 1.83 m (6 ft 0 in)
- Position: Defender

Team information
- Current team: (manager)

Senior career*
| Years | Team | Apps | (Gls) |
| 1995–2005 | Étoile du Sahel | | |
| 2005–2006 | Club Africain | | |
| 2006–2007 | JS Kairouan | | |

International career
| 1996–2004 | Tunisia | 23 | (0) |

Managerial career
- 2010: Étoile du Sahel
- 2012–2013: Club Africain (assistant)
- 2013: Tunisia (assistant)
- 2014: Club Africain (assistant)
- 2014–2015: Étoile du Sahel (assistant)
- 2015: Sfax Railways Sports
- 2015–2018: CS Chebba
- 2018–2019: Stade Tunisien
- 2019–2020: Manama Club
- 2020–2021: Al-Adalah
- 2021–2022: Al-Ain
- 2022–2023: Étoile du Sahel
- 2023: Ohod
- 2026: Al-Adalah
- * Club domestic league appearances and goals

Mohamed Mkacher (Arabic: محمد مكشر; born 25 May 1975) is a Tunisian football coach and a former player. A defender, he was nominated for the Tunisia national team at the 2002 FIFA World Cup..
