= Fahad Al-Harbi =

Saudi Arabian footballer

Fahad Al-Harbi فهد الحربي
Personal information
- Full name: Fahad Mohammed Al-Harbi
- Date of birth: 25 February 1997 (age 29)
- Place of birth: Saudi Arabia
- Position: Defender

Team information
- Current team: Al-Jabalain
- Number: 12

Youth career
- –2016: Al-Raed
- 2016–2019: Al-Ahli

Senior career*
Years	Team	Apps	(Gls)
2019–2020	Al-Bukayriyah	-	(2)
2020–2024	Al-Fateh	23	(0)
2022–2023	→ Al-Adalah (loan)	21	(0)
2024–2025	Neom	19	(1)
2025–	Al-Jabalain	0	(0)

International career
2015–2017	Saudi Arabia U-20		
2019–2021	Saudi Arabia U-23		
- * Club domestic league appearances and goals

Fahad Al-Harbi (Arabic: فهد الحربي; born 25 February 1997) is a Saudi Arabian professional footballer who plays as a defender for Saudi First Division League side Al-Jabalain.

== Career ==
Al-Harbi started his career at the youth team of Al-Raed. On 30 April 2016, Al-Harbi joined the youth team of Al-Ahli, On 14 February 2019, Al-Harbi joined Al-Bukayriyah. On 30 September 2020, Al-Harbi joined Pro League side Al-Fateh on a four-year deal. On 27 August 2022, Al-Harbi joined Al-Adalah on loan. On 19 July 2024, Al-Harbi joined First Division club Neom. On 18 September 2025, Al-Harbi joined Al-Jabalain.
