= Gustavo Cuéllar =

Colombian footballer (born 1992)

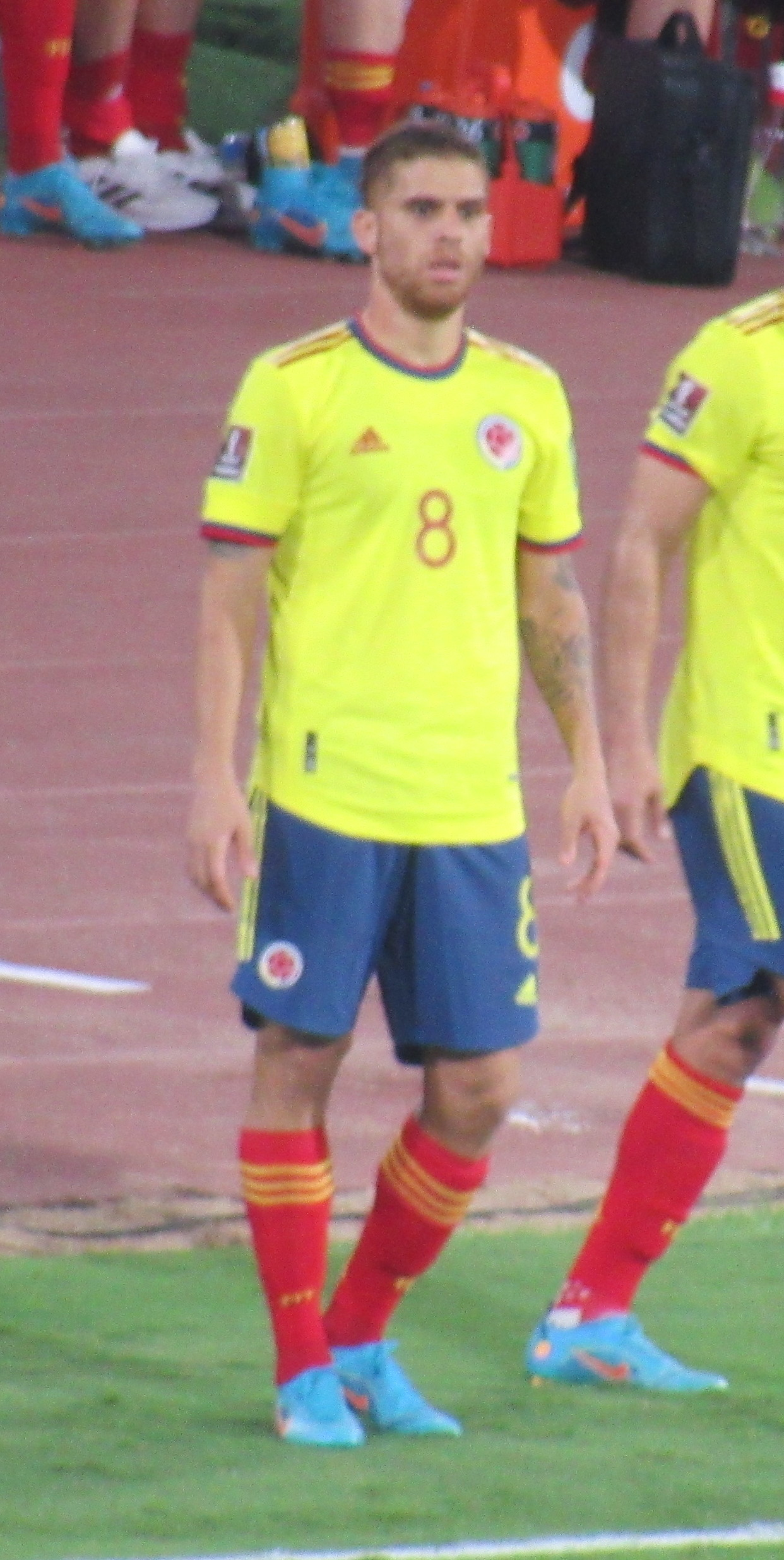
- Cuéllar with Colombia in 2022

Personal information
- Full name: Gustavo Leonardo Cuéllar Gallegos
- Date of birth: 14 October 1992 (age 34)
- Place of birth: Barranquilla, Colombia
- Height: 1.77 m (5 ft 10 in)
- Position: Defensive midfielder

Team information
- Current team: Deportivo Cali
- Number: 6

Youth career
- 2008–2009: Deportivo Cali

Senior career*
Years	Team	Apps	(Gls)
2009–2016	Deportivo Cali	118	(2)
2014–2016	→ Junior (loan)	49	(0)
2016–2019	Flamengo	113	(0)
2019–2023	Al-Hilal	98	(0)
2023–2025	Al-Shabab	38	(0)
2025–2026	Grêmio	25	(0)
2026–	Deportivo Cali	0	(0)

International career^{‡}
2009	Colombia U17	7	(2)
2011	Colombia U20	5	(0)
2015–2022	Colombia	24	(1)
Medal record
Representing Colombia
Men's football
Copa América
Third place	2021 Brazil
- * Club domestic league appearances and goals as of 13 March 2026 ‡ National team caps and goals as of 21:41, 25 March 2022 (UTC)

Gustavo Leonardo Cuéllar Gallegos (born 14 October 1992) is a Colombian professional footballer who plays as a defensive midfielder for Categoría Primera A club Deportivo Cali and the Colombia national team.

== Club career ==
=== Deportivo Cali ===
Cuéllar began playing for the Deportivo Cali youth setup and made his professional debut in 2009. He scored his first professional goal in the first match of the 2013 Categoría Primera A season Apertura tournament against Once Caldas. It was the winning goal of a 2–1 victory. Cuéllar formed a key part of the 2013 squad that finished runners-up in 2013 Torneo Finalización, losing in the finals to Atlético Nacional.

==== Junior (loan) ====
Cuéllar was loaned to Atlético Junior from mid-2014 to mid-2016. Junior were eliminated in the round-robin stage of the 2014 Torneo Finalización. With the arrival of Alexis Mendoza as manager in 2015 Cuéllar established himself as one of the team's best players, participating in nearly 50 matches.

=== Flamengo ===
On 20 January 2016, Deportivo Cali confirmed that Cuéllar would be transferred to Brazilian giants Flamengo. The transfer fee was reported to be close to R$8 million for 70% of his economic rights.

In his first season with the Brazilian club he could not establish himself as a regular starter. Cuéllar played 16 Brazilian Série A matches, only four as a starter, and managed to play a total 33 matches throughout the season.

During the beginning of the 2017 Brazilian Série A season rumors in the Brazilian media linked Cuéllar with Vitória on a possible loan. Despite the interest from other clubs, Cuéllar started to receive more chances in the first team, including playing as a starter. Flamengo won the 2017 Campeonato Carioca with six appearances by Cuéllar. On 28 June 2017, in a Copa do Brasil match against Santos at Ilha do Urubu, Cuéllar scored his first goal for Flamengo in a 2–0 victory.

Only after Flamengo signed compatriot Reinaldo Rueda as head coach did Cuéllar manage to take a starting position in the midfield. He played a total of 51 matches in the season scoring two goals, including 25 Brazilian Série A matches.

On 8 June 2018, Cuéllar extended his contract with Flamengo until June 2022, this new contract raised his release clause from €50 million to €70 million.

Cuéllar continued to be a star player for Flamengo in central midfield, helping to capture the 2019 Campeonato Carioca. He continued to be a transfer target for some European clubs. In August 2019, Cuéllar was suspended from club activities indefinitely for refusing to travel with the team for the following league match, citing family matters. He was reintegrated into the squad ahead of Flamengo's Copa Libertadores quarter-final match against Internacional, which would be his final match for the club.

=== Al-Hilal ===
O 30 August 2019, Saudi Arabian club Al-Hilal announced the signing of Cuéllar from Flamengo. The fee was reported to be €7.5 million.

=== Al-Shabab ===
On 4 July 2023, Cuéllar joined Al-Shabab on a three-year deal.

== International career ==
Gustavo played for Colombia U17 in the 2009 FIFA U-17 World Cup, he appeared in all seven matches and scored two goals, both against Gambia in a 2–2 draw, as the team finished the tournament in fourth place.

He also represented Colombia U20 in the 2011 South American U-20 Championship, he had five appearances and the team finished the tournament in the sixth place.

On 8 September 2015, Gustavo debuted for Colombia as a starter in a 1–1 draw against Peru in Harrison, United States.

In May 2018 he was named in Colombia's preliminary 35-man squad for the 2018 FIFA World Cup in Russia. However, he did not make the final cut to 23.

On 30 May 2019, Cuéllar was named by manager Carlos Queiroz to the 23-man squad for the 2019 Copa América in Brazil. He made one appearance in the group stage, appearing in the starting lineup and scoring the winning goal against Paraguay.

== Career statistics ==
=== Club ===
As of match played 16 March 2025

Appearances and goals by club, season and competition
Club	Season	League			State league (Note: Includes Campeonato Carioca, Campeonato Gaúcho)		National cup (Note: Includes Copa Colombia, Copa do Brasil, King's Cup)		Continental		Other		Total	
Club	Season	Division	Apps	Goals	Apps	Goals	Apps	Goals	Apps	Goals	Apps	Goals	Apps	Goals
Deportivo Cali	2009	Primera A	1	0	—				—		—		1	0
Deportivo Cali	2010	Primera A	12	0	—				—		—		12	0
Deportivo Cali	2011	Primera A	20	0	—		6	0	1 (Note: Appearance(s) in Copa Sudamericana)	0	—		27	0
Deportivo Cali	2012	Primera A	37	0	—		4	0	—		—		41	0
Deportivo Cali	2013	Primera A	38	2	—		3	0	—		—		41	2
Deportivo Cali	2014	Primera A	10	0	—		2	0	5 (Note: Appearances in Copa Libertadores)	0	—		17	0
Deportivo Cali	Total		118	2	0	0	15	0	6	0	0	0	139	2
Junior (loan)	2014	Primera A	15	0	—		10	0	—		—		25	0
Junior (loan)	2015	Primera A	34	0	—		9	0	4	0	—		47	0
Junior (loan)	Total		49	0	0	0	19	0	4	0	0	0	72	0
Flamengo	2016	Série A	16	0	8	0	4	0	3	0	2 (Note: Appearances in Primeira Liga)	0	33	0
Flamengo	2017	Série A	25	0	6	0	7	1	11 (Note: Two appearances in Copa Libertadores, nine appearances and one goal in Copa Sudamericana)	1	2	0	51	2
Flamengo	2018	Série A	28	0	11	0	6	0	6	0	—		51	0
Flamengo	2019	Série A	9	0	10	0	3	0	10	0	—		32	0
Flamengo	Total		78	0	35	0	20	1	30	1	4	0	167	2
Al-Hilal	2019–20	Saudi Pro League	26	0	—		5	0	—		3 (Note: Appearances in FIFA Club World Cup)	0	34	0
Al-Hilal	2020–21	Saudi Pro League	25	0	—		1	0	—		1 (Note: Appearance in Saudi Super Cup)	0	27	0
Al-Hilal	2021–22	Saudi Pro League	23	0	—		3	0	4 (Note: Appearances in AFC Champions League)	0	3	0	33	0
Al-Hilal	2022–23	Saudi Pro League	24	0	—		2	0	—		3 (Note: One appearance in Saudi Super Cup, two appearances in FIFA Club World Cup)	0	29	0
Al-Hilal	Total		98	0	0	0	11	0	4	0	10	0	123	0
Al Shabab	2023–24	Saudi Pro League	30	0	—		2	0	—		4 (Note: Appearances in Arab Club Champions Cup)	1	36	1
Al Shabab	2024–25	Saudi Pro League	8	0	—		0	0	—		—		8	0
Al Shabab	Total		38	0	0	0	2	0	0	0	4	1	44	1
Grêmio	2025	Série A	0	0	7	0	1	0	0	0	—		8	0
Career total			381	2	42	0	68	1	44	1	18	1	553	5

=== International ===
As of match played 24 March 2022

Appearances and goals by national team and year
National team	Year	Apps	Goals
Colombia	2015	1	0
Colombia	2016	1	0
Colombia	2017	1	0
Colombia	2018	1	0
Colombia	2019	3	1
Colombia	2021	14	0
Colombia	2022	2	0
Total		23	1

Scores and results list Colombia's goal tally first, score column indicates score after each Cuéllar goal.

List of international goals scored by Gustavo Cuéllar
No.	Date	Venue	Opponent	Score	Result	Competition
1	23 June 2019	Itaipava Arena Fonte Nova, Salvador, Brazil	Paraguay	1–0	1–0	2019 Copa América

== Honours ==
Deportivo Cali

- Copa Colombia: 2010

Junior

- Copa Colombia: 2015

Flamengo

- Campeonato Carioca: 2017, 2019

Al-Hilal

- AFC Champions League: 2019 2021
- Saudi Pro League: 2019–20, 2020–21, 2021–22
- King Cup: 2019–20
- Saudi Super Cup: 2021

Grêmio

- Recopa Gaúcha: 2025

Individual

- Campeonato Carioca Team of the Year: 2019
