= Hassan Al-Majhad =

Saudi Arabian footballer (born 1992)

Personal information
- Full name: Hassan Ali Al-Majhad
- Date of birth: 18 May 1992 (age 34)
- Place of birth: Saudi Arabia
- Height: 1.75 m (5 ft 9 in)
- Position: Midfielder

Team information
- Current team: Al-Adalah
- Number: 17

Youth career
- Al-Jeel

Senior career*
Years	Team	Apps	(Gls)
2014–2017	Al-Jeel		
2017–2018	Al-Nojoom		
2018–2019	Al-Adalah	6	(0)
2019	Al-Orobah	4	(0)
2019–2020	Al-Diriyah	20	(3)
2020–2024	Al-Khaleej	84	(1)
2024	→ Al-Adalah (loan)	11	(1)
2024–	Al-Adalah	0	(0)
- * Club domestic league appearances and goals as of 27 May 2024

Hassan Al-Majhad (Arabic: حسن المجحد; born 18 May 1992) is a Saudi Arabian professional footballer who plays as a midfielder for Al-Adalah.

== Career ==
Al-Majhad started his career at Al-Jeel's youth team. He made his debut during the second half of the 2013–14 season. On 15 August 2014, Al-Majhad scored his first goal for the club in a 1–1 draw against Al-Qadsiah. On 16 June 2017, Al-Majhad joined city rivals Al-Nojoom following Al-Jeel's relegation to the Second Division. On 12 July 2018, Al-Majhad joined Al-Adalah. On 16 January 2019, he joined Al-Orobah following his release from Al-Adalah. On 4 September 2019, he joined Second Division side Al-Diriyah. He made 20 appearances and scored three goals, helping them achieve promotion to the First Division. On 29 September 2020, Al-Majhad joined First Division side Al-Khaleej. During the 2021–22 season, he made 35 appearances and scored once, helping Al-Khaleej win the First Division title and gain promotion to the Pro League. On 20 June 2022, Al-Majhad renewed his contract with Al-Khaleej until the 2024–25 season. On 25 August 2022, he came off the bench to make his Pro League debut in a 2–0 loss to Al-Hilal. On 15 October 2022, Al-Majhad made his first start of the season in a 4–0 defeat to Al-Shabab. On 26 January 2024, he joined Al-Adalah on a six-month loan. In July 2024, Al-Majhad joined Al-Adalah on a permanent deal.

== Honours ==
Al-Diriyah

- Second Division runners-up: 2019–20 (promotion to the First Division)

Al-Khaleej

- First Division: 2021–22
