= Hussain Al-Nattar =

Saudi Arabian footballer

Personal information
- Full name: Hussain Hassan Al-Nattar
- Date of birth: 14 March 2000 (age 26)
- Place of birth: Qatif, Saudi Arabia
- Height: 1.75 m (5 ft 9 in)
- Position: Midfielder

Youth career
- –2015: Al-Muheet
- 2015–2019: Al-Ettifaq
- 2019–2020: Al-Qadsiah

Senior career*
Years	Team	Apps	(Gls)
2020–2025	Al-Qadsiah	63	(0)
2022–2023	→ Al-Adalah (loan)	5	(0)
2025	Al-Faisaly	13	(1)

International career
2016	Saudi Arabia U17		
2017–2018	Saudi Arabia U20		
- * Club domestic league appearances and goals as of 28 May 2024

Hussain Al-Nattar (Arabic: حسين النطار, born 14 March 2000) is a Saudi Arabian professional footballer who plays as a midfielder.

== Career ==
Al-Nattar began his career at the youth teams of hometown club Al-Muheet. On 21 December 2015, Al-Nattar joined the youth team of Al-Ettifaq. On 5 October 2019, Al-Nattar joined rival club Al-Qadsiah. He made three appearances during the 2019–20 season as Al-Qadsiah finished in second to earn promotion to the Pro League. On 14 January 2021, Al-Nattar made his Pro League debut in a 2–2 draw against Al-Faisaly. He made 13 appearances during the 2020–21 season as Al-Qadsiah were relegated at the end of the season. On 9 August 2022, Al-Nattar joined Al-Adalah on loan until the end of the 2022–23 season. He made his debut for Al-Adalah on 7 October 2022 in the 2–1 win against Al-Fayha. On 15 July 2024, Al-Nattar renewed his contract with Al-Qadsiah. On 31 January 2025, Al-Nattar joined Al-Faisaly.

== Honours ==
Al-Qadsiah

- First Division League: 2023–24, runner-up 2019–20
