= Khaled Al-Hamdhi =

Saudi Arabian footballer

Personal information
- Full name: Khaled Nasser Al-Hamdhi
- Date of birth: August 17, 1991 (age 35)
- Place of birth: Saudi Arabia
- Height: 1.73 m (5 ft 8 in)
- Position: Midfielder

Team information
- Current team: Al-Adalah
- Number: 16

Youth career
- ???–2012: Ras Tanura
- 2012–2013: Al-Ettifaq

Senior career*
Years	Team	Apps	(Gls)
2013–2018	Al-Ettifaq	26	(1)
2016–2017	→ Al-Orobah (loan)	22	(0)
2018–2021	Al-Khaleej	95	(3)
2021–	Al-Adalah	9	(0)
- * Club domestic league appearances and goals

Khaled Al-Hamdhi (Arabic: خالد الحامضي; born 17 August 1991) is a Saudi professional footballer who plays as a midfielder for Al-Adalah.
