= Prince Abdulaziz bin Musaed Sports City Stadium =

Football stadium in Hail, Saudi Arabia

Prince Abdulaziz bin Musaed Sports City Stadium ملعب مدينة الأمير عبدالعزيز بن مساعد الرياضية
- Interactive map of Prince Abdulaziz bin Musaed Sports City Stadium ملعب مدينة الأمير عبدالعزيز بن مساعد الرياضية
- Location: Hail City, Saudi Arabia
- Coordinates: 27°30′14″N 41°41′51″E
- Owner: Ministry of Sport
- Operator: Ministry of Sport
- Capacity: 12,250

Construction
- Opened: 1981; 45 years ago
- Expanded: 2022; 4 years ago

Tenants
- Al-Jabalain (1981–present); Al-Tai (1981–present)

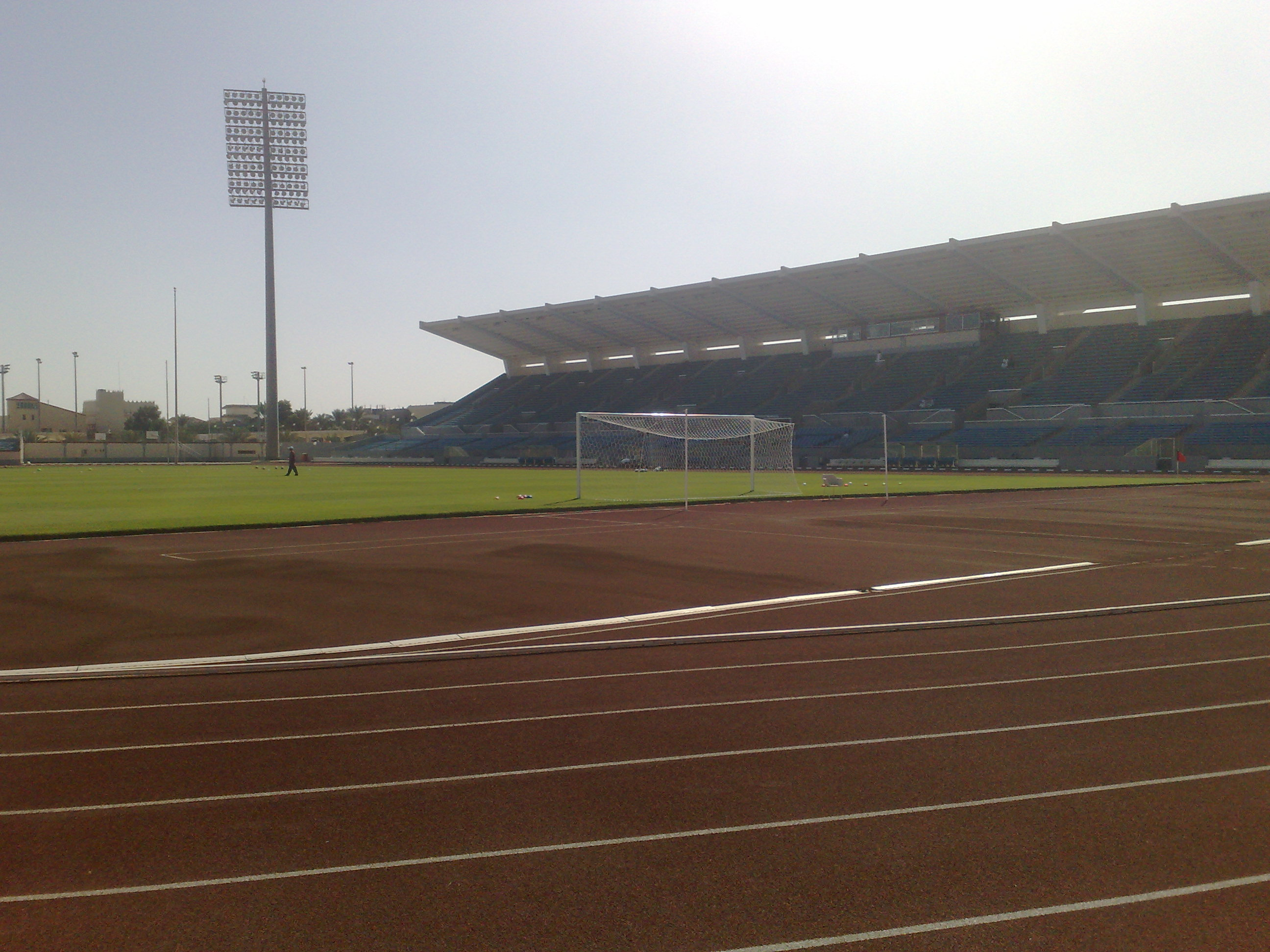
Prince Abdulaziz bin Musaed Stadium, 2010

The Prince Abdulaziz bin Musaed Sports City Stadium is a multi-purpose stadium located in Hail City. It is primarily used for football matches and serves as the home stadium for both Al-Jabalain and Al-Tai.

== Overview ==
The stadium is named after Abdulaziz bin Musaed, the second governor of Hail Province and its longest-serving leader.

The stadium has a current capacity of 12,250 people following an expansion in 2022.

Besides the football stadium, the sports complex also includes other facilities such as a sports hall, an Olympic-size swimming pool, a squash court, a track and field track, and a youth dorm.

The stadium underwent renovations in June 2021 following Al-Tai's promotion to the Saudi Pro League.

The renovations involved cultivating the grass, renewing the changing rooms, and establishing a media center to host press conferences and a video operation room to host VAR officials.

== See also ==
- List of football stadiums in Saudi Arabia
