= Al-Jabalain Club =

Association football club in Saudi Arabia

Al Jabalain
- Full name: Al-Jabalain Football Club
- Nickname: Al-Bunni (The Brown)
- Founded: 1959; 67 years ago
- Ground: Prince Abdulaziz bin Musaed Sports City Stadium; Hail, Saudi Arabia
- Capacity: 12,250
- Owner: Ministry of Sport
- Chairman: Fayez Al-Moajel
- Head coach: Filipe Gouveia
- League: Saudi First Division League
- 2025–26: FDL, 6th of 18
- Website: aljabalainfc.sa

Al-Jabalain Football Club (Arabic: نادي الجبلين, lit. Two Mountains Football Club) is a Saudi Arabian professional football club based in the city of Hail, in north-western Saudi Arabia, that competes in the Saudi First Division League, the second tier of the Saudi football league system.

== History ==
Al-Jabalain have won the Saudi First Division once, in the 1979–80 season, and have finished as runners-up once, in the 1983–84 season. The club have spent three non-consecutive seasons in the Saudi Premier League, earning their first promotion during the 1979–80 season. They last played in the top division during the 1984–85 season.

The club play their home games at the Prince Abdulaziz bin Musaed Sports City Stadium in Hail, sharing the stadium with city rivals Al-Tai, with whom they contest the Hail derby.

== Honours ==
- Saudi First Division League
  - Winners (1): 1979–80
  - Runners-up (1): 1983–84
- Saudi Second Division League
  - Runners-up (5): 1977–78 , 1990–91 , 1993–94 , 2001–02 , 2017–18
- Saudi Third Division League
  - Winners (1): 2014–15
  - Runners-up (1): 1999–00
- Prince Faisal bin Fahd Cup for Division 1 and 2 Teams
  - Runners-up (1): 1996–97, 2002–03

== Current squad ==
As of 25 October 2025:

Note: Flags indicate national team as defined under FIFA eligibility rules; some limited exceptions apply. Players may hold more than one non-FIFA nationality.

No.	Pos.	Nation	Player
1	GK	KSA	Abdulrahman Al-Ghubaini
3	DF	KSA	Fahad Al-Harbi
4	DF	KSA	Ahmed Al Muhaimeed (on loan from Al-Faisaly)
5	MF	KSA	Ibrahim Mousa Al-Nakhli
6	MF	KSA	Abdulmalik Al-Marwani (on loan from Al-Taawoun)
7	MF	KSA	Sattam Al-Roqi
8	MF	CPV	Yannick Semedo
9	FW	KSA	Saleh Al-Rahmani (on loan from Al-Diriyah)
10	MF	BRA	Ênio (on loan from Juventude)
17	MF	KSA	Hassan Al-Majhad
18	MF	KSA	Khaled Sattam
19	MF	KSA	Yazeed Al-Rushaidan
20	DF	KSA	Nawaf Al-Mutairi
21	MF	KSA	Mohammed Al-Anazi

No.	Pos.	Nation	Player
23	MF	KSA	Abdulsalam Al-Shammari
27	DF	KSA	Hussain Al-Nowaiqi
28	MF	POR	Carlos Daniel
30	GK	KSA	Mohammed Al-Waked
33	DF	KSA	Abdulelah Bukhari
44	DF	KSA	Mohammed Majrashi
55	DF	KSA	Zaid Salem
61	FW	NGR	Rasheed Akanbi
71	FW	KSA	Hussain Al-Sultan (on loan from Al-Khaleej)
77	GK	KSA	Naif Al-Hussaini
87	DF	KSA	Ghassan Hawsawi
88	DF	KSA	Ibrahim Hussain Al-Nakhli
90	FW	MDA	Henrique Luvannor
99	FW	KSA	Majed Khalifa

=== Out on loan ===
Note: Flags indicate national team as defined under FIFA eligibility rules; some limited exceptions apply. Players may hold more than one non-FIFA nationality.

No.	Pos.	Nation	Player
11	MF	KSA	Al Mutasim Seddiq (at Al-Shoulla)

== Management staff ==
Position	Name
Head coach	(Portugal) Filipe Gouveia
Assistant coach	(Portugal) Frederico Ricardo
Goalkeeper coach	(Portugal) Fábio Girôto
Conditioning coach	(Portugal) João Santos
Fitness coach	(Saudi Arabia) Radhi Al-Ghubaini
Rehab coach	(Saudi Arabia) Nasser Al-Zubaidi
Sporting director	(Saudi Arabia) Abdulsalam Al-Mousa
Development coach	(Saudi Arabia) Faisal Al-Rashidi

== See also ==
- List of football clubs in Saudi Arabia
