= Al Adalah Club =

Association football club in Saudi Arabia

Al-Adalah
- Full name: Al-Adalah Football Club
- Nickname: Fursan Al-Waha (Knights of the Oasis)
- Founded: 1984; 42 years ago
- Ground: Prince Abdullah bin Jalawi Sport City
- Capacity: 19,550
- President: Abdulaziz Al-Mudhey
- Head coach: Abdulhadi Al-Abdullah (caretaker)
- League: First Division League
- 2025–26: FDL, 14th of 18
- Website: aladalahclub.com
Home colours	Away colours	Third colours

Al-Adalah Football Club (Arabic: نادي العدالة لكرة القدم, romanized: nādī al-ʿadāla l-kurat al-qadam, "Justice F.C.") is a Saudi Arabian professional football club based in Al-Hulaylah, Al-Ahsa, that plays in the Saudi First Division League.

== History ==
Al-Adalah have finished as Second Division runners-up twice, first in the 2008–09 season and then in the 2015–16 season. The club have spent only four seasons in the Saudi First Division, the second tier of Saudi football, before achieving promotion to the Pro League. On 15 May 2019, the club made history by achieving promotion to the Pro League for the first time.

The club play their home games at Prince Abdullah bin Jalawi Sport City in Al-Ahsa, sharing the stadium with two other City-based clubs, Hajer and Al-Jeel.

== Honours ==
- Saudi First Division League (Tier 2)
  - Runners-up: 2021–22
  - Third place: 2018–19
- Saudi Second Division (Tier 3)
  - Runners-up: 2008–09, 2015–16
- Saudi Third Division (Tier 4)
  - Winners: 2000–01

== Coaching staff ==
Position	Name
Head coach	(Saudi Arabia) Abdulhadi Al-Abdullah (caretaker)
Assistant coach	(Saudi Arabia) Hussain Al-Salem
Goalkeeper coach	(Saudi Arabia) Mohammed Al-Bashah
Fitness coach	(Saudi Arabia) Hassan Al-Jahani
Rehab coach	(Saudi Arabia) Abdulelah Al-Habib
Youth coach	(Saudi Arabia) Abdullah Al-Jaafari
Performance analysis	(Saudi Arabia) Omar Al-Hamdhi
Doctor	(Saudi Arabia) Ibrahim Al-Jaafari
Physiotherapists	(Saudi Arabia) Basim Al-Bladi
Masseur	(Saudi Arabia) Khaled Bu-Hassan
Performance director	(Saudi Arabia) Hassan Al-Yousef
Academy director	(Saudi Arabia) Saleh Al-Muharrabeh
Kit manager	(Saudi Arabia) Salem Al-Zahrani

== Former managers ==
- (Saudi Arabia) Mohammed Al-Janoubi (August 22, 2002 – October 17, 2002)
- (Saudi Arabia) Hussain Al-Abdulwahab (October 17, 2002 – December 18, 2002)
- (Tunisia) Hassine Menestiri (December 18, 2002 – April 30, 2003)
- (Saudi Arabia) Ahmed Al-Habib (August 1, 2003 – January 24, 2004)
- (Egypt) Khamis Gera (January 24, 2004 – March 21, 2004)
- (Saudi Arabia) Hussain Al-Abdulwahab (March 23, 2004 – August 13, 2005)
- (Tunisia) Mehrez Al Dami (August 13, 2005 – September 21, 2005)
- (Saudi Arabia) Hussain Al-Abdulwahab (caretaker) (September 21, 2005 – October 20, 2005)
- (Tunisia) Morsi Ktata (October 20, 2005 – July 10, 2006)
- (Tunisia) Ali Zouari (July 24, 2006 – October 5, 2006)
- (Tunisia) Samir Al Khamira (October 5, 2006 – January 9, 2007)
- (Saudi Arabia) Ahmed Al-Habib (caretaker) (January 9, 2007 – February 4, 2007)
- (Tunisia) Najib Khouaja (February 4, 2007 – May 30, 2007)
- (Tunisia) Mahdi Ben Sohaima (June 18, 2007 – November 3, 2007)
- (Saudi Arabia) Ahmed Al-Habib (caretaker) (November 3, 2007 – November 19, 2007)
- (Tunisia) Mohamed Zouiten (November 19, 2007 – January 23, 2008)
- (Tunisia) Najib Khouaja (January 23, 2008 – May 17, 2009)
- (Tunisia) Zouhair Louati (July 18, 2009 – March 5, 2010)
- (Egypt) Abdullah Darwish (March 5, 2010 – May 10, 2010)
- (Tunisia) Morsi Ktata (July 14, 2010 – March 20, 2011)
- (Tunisia) Nasser Nefzi (March 20, 2011 – May 30, 2011)
- (Tunisia) Habib Ben Romdhane (August 1, 2011 – December 1, 2011)
- (Tunisia) Najib Khouaja (December 1, 2011 – December 20, 2012)
- (Tunisia) Wahid Hidoussi (December 20, 2012 – May 30, 2013)
- (Egypt) Salah Abou El Fattouh (July 31, 2013 – November 23, 2013)
- (Tunisia) Noureddine Labyad (November 23, 2013 – June 1, 2014)
- (Tunisia) Selim Al Manga (August 13, 2014 – May 30, 2015)
- (Tunisia) Mohamed Saidi (July 30, 2015 – November 14, 2016)
- (Egypt) Ahmed Sari (November 14, 2016 – March 20, 2017)
- (Egypt) Abdullah Darwish (March 27, 2017 – May 5, 2018)
- (Tunisia) Ridha Jeddi (May 15, 2018 – April 26, 2019)
- (Saudi Arabia) Redha Al-Janbe (April 26, 2019 – May 16, 2019)
- (Tunisia) Skander Kasri (May 31, 2019 – November 4, 2019)
- (Tunisia) Nacif Beyaoui (November 5, 2019 – June 13, 2020)
- (Italy) Giovanni Solinas (June 25, 2020 – September 9, 2020)
- (Tunisia) Mohamed Mkacher (September 18, 2020 – January 29, 2021)
- (Tunisia) Jalel Kadri (January 31, 2021 – June 1, 2021)
- (Tunisia) Nacif Beyaoui (June 3, 2021 – March 18, 2022)
- (Tunisia) Yousef Al Mannai (March 18, 2022 – October 22, 2022)
- (Slovakia) Martin Ševela (October 23, 2022 – June 1, 2023)
- (Croatia) Ante Miše (June 16, 2023 – December 15, 2023)
- (Saudi Arabia) Abdulhadi Al-Abdullah (caretaker) (December 15, 2023 – December 21, 2023)
- (Netherlands) Roel Coumans (December 21, 2023 – May 31, 2024)
- (Slovakia) Martin Ševela (June 19, 2024 – June 1, 2025)
- (Tunisia) Mohamed Ayari (August 3, 2025 – October 29, 2025)
- (Saudi Arabia) Abdulhadi Al-Abdullah (caretaker) (October 29, 2025 – November 17, 2025)
- (France) Didier Gomes Da Rosa (November 18, 2025 – March 18, 2026)
- (Tunisia) Mohamed Mkacher (March 25, 2026 – )

== Current squad ==
As of 13 September 2025:

Note: Flags indicate national team as defined under FIFA eligibility rules; some limited exceptions apply. Players may hold more than one non-FIFA nationality.

No.	Pos.	Nation	Player
6	MF	KSA	Ammar Al-Bashah
7	MF	KSA	Riyadh Al-Ibrahim
11	FW	KSA	Montadar Bo Hassan
12	GK	KSA	Mohammed Al-Dossari
13	GK	KSA	Mohammed Al-Bladi
14	DF	KSA	Mohammed Al-Musallam
15	MF	KSA	Hassan Al-Mohammed
16	MF	KSA	Khaled Al-Hamdhi
17	MF	KSA	Hassan Al-Majhad
18	MF	KSA	Elyas Al-Bladi
19	MF	KSA	Khalid Al-Muzayil
23	DF	KSA	Muteb Al-Khaldi
24	MF	KSA	Mohammed Al-Marri
25	DF	KSA	Tawfiq Buhimed

No.	Pos.	Nation	Player
26	DF	KSA	Mohammed Al-Hajji
27	DF	KSA	Salman Al-Omaish
29	DF	KSA	Abdulaziz Al-Jamaan
33	DF	CIV	Koffi Kouamé
37	MF	ZAM	Joshua Mutale
71	FW	KSA	Ali Al-Abbad
95	MF	COD	André Bukia
98	FW	KSA	Rashed Al-Salem
—	DF	KSA	Ahmed Al-Muwallad
—	DF	KSA	Sultan Faqihi
—	DF	KSA	Abdullah Al-Rashidi
—	MF	KSA	Ali Al-Zaqaan
—	MF	KSA	Hussain Al-Nattar
—	MF	BRA	Diego Miranda

== See also ==
- List of football clubs in Saudi Arabia
