= 2021–22 Abha Club season =

Abha
2021–22 season
- President: Ahmed Al-Hodithy
- Manager: Martin Ševela
- Stadium: Prince Sultan bin Abdul Aziz Stadium
- Pro League: 9th
- King Cup: Round of 16 (knocked out by Al-Fayha)
- Top goalscorer: League: Saad Bguir (7 goals); All: Saad Bguir (7 goals)
- Highest home attendance: 12,243 (vs. Al-Hilal, 28 November 2021)
- Lowest home attendance: 141 (vs. Al-Raed, 1 January 2022)
- Average home league attendance: 2,874
- All statistics correct as of 27 June 2022.

The 2021–22 season was Abha's fifth non-consecutive season in the Pro League and their 56th season in existence. The club participated in the Pro League and the King Cup.

The season covered the period from 1 July 2021 to 30 June 2022.

== Players ==
=== Squad information ===
As of 1 February 2022

Note: Flags indicate national team as defined under FIFA eligibility rules; some limited exceptions apply. Players may hold more than one non-FIFA nationality.

No.	Pos.	Nation	Player
1	GK	KSA	Abdullah Al-Shammeri
2	DF	TUN	Bilel Ifa
3	DF	KSA	Abdullah Al-Zori
6	DF	KSA	Karam Barnawi (captain)
7	MF	KSA	Saleh Al-Amri
8	MF	SRB	Uroš Matić
9	FW	SUR	Mitchell te Vrede
10	MF	TUN	Saad Bguir
11	MF	KSA	Jehad Al-Zowayed
12	GK	MAR	Abdelali Mhamdi
13	DF	KSA	Mohammed Al-Kunaydiri
14	MF	KSA	Fahad Al-Jumayah
15	MF	KSA	Mutair Al-Zahrani
17	MF	ALG	Tayeb Meziani
18	MF	KSA	Nawaf Al-Sadi

No.	Pos.	Nation	Player
19	DF	MAR	Amine Atouchi
23	MF	KSA	Abdulrahman Al-Barakah
29	MF	KSA	Abdullah Al-Qahtani (on loan from Al-Faisaly)
31	DF	KSA	Sari Amr
33	GK	KSA	Mansour Jawhar
34	GK	KSA	Ali Al-Mazidi
39	DF	KSA	Saeed Al Hamsal
45	MF	KSA	Hassan Al-Qayd
70	FW	JOR	Muath Afaneh
77	DF	KSA	Ahmed Al-Habib
80	MF	KSA	Tariq Al-Shahrani
89	MF	KSA	Riyadh Sharahili
90	FW	KSA	Omar Al-Ruwaili
98	DF	KSA	Muhannad Al-Qaydhi

=== Out on loan ===
Note: Flags indicate national team as defined under FIFA eligibility rules; some limited exceptions apply. Players may hold more than one non-FIFA nationality.

No. / Pos. / Nation / Player; 16 / MF / KSA / Musab Habkor (at Al-Kawkab until 30 June 2022)	No. / Pos. / Nation / Player; 99 / MF / CGO / Prestige Mboungou (at Metalac until 30 June 2022)

== Transfers and loans ==
=== Transfers in ===
Entry date	Position	No.	Player	From club	Fee	Ref.
30 June 2021	GK	33	(Saudi Arabia) Mansour Jawhar	(Saudi Arabia) Al-Fayha	End of loan	
30 June 2021	MF	11	(Saudi Arabia) Jehad Al-Zowayed	(Saudi Arabia) Al-Hazem	End of loan	
30 June 2021	MF	16	(Saudi Arabia) Musab Habkor	(Saudi Arabia) Najran	End of loan	
30 June 2021	MF	–	(Saudi Arabia) Abdullah Nasser	(Saudi Arabia) Al-Nojoom	End of loan	
1 July 2021	MF	15	(Saudi Arabia) Mutair Al-Zahrani	(Saudi Arabia) Al-Taawoun	Free	
4 July 2021	DF	13	(Saudi Arabia) Mohammed Al-Kunaydiri	(Saudi Arabia) Al-Hilal	Free	
13 July 2021	MF	14	(Saudi Arabia) Fahad Al-Jumayah	(Saudi Arabia) Al-Nassr	$800,000	
26 July 2021	MF	8	(Serbia) Uroš Matić	(Azerbaijan) Qarabağ	Free	
6 August 2021	MF	99	(Republic of the Congo) Prestige Mboungou	(Serbia) Metalac	$350,000	
11 August 2021	FW	9	(Suriname) Mitchell te Vrede	(Saudi Arabia) Al-Fateh	Free	
14 August 2021	DF	5	(Spain) Dani Suárez	(Greece) Asteras Tripolis	Free	
24 August 2021	MF	45	(Saudi Arabia) Hassan Al-Qayd	(Saudi Arabia) Al-Shabab	Free	
11 January 2022	MF	17	(Algeria) Tayeb Meziani	(Tunisia) ES Sahel	$700,000	
12 January 2022	DF	2	(Tunisia) Bilel Ifa	(Tunisia) Club Africain	$800,000	
28 January 2022	DF	3	(Saudi Arabia) Abdullah Al-Zori	(Saudi Arabia) Al-Shabab	Free	

=== Loans in ===
Start date	End date	Position	No.	Player	From club	Fee	Ref.
31 August 2021	End of season	MF	29	(Saudi Arabia) Abdullah Al-Qahtani	(Saudi Arabia) Al-Faisaly	None	

=== Transfers out ===
Exit date	Position	No.	Player	To club	Fee	Ref.
30 June 2021	DF	13	(Saudi Arabia) Ali Meadi	(Saudi Arabia) Al-Faisaly	End of loan	
30 June 2021	MF	10	(Saudi Arabia) Abdullah Al-Qahtani	(Saudi Arabia) Al-Faisaly	End of loan	
30 June 2021	MF	14	(Saudi Arabia) Fahad Al-Jumayah	(Saudi Arabia) Al-Nassr	End of loan	
30 June 2021	MF	16	(Saudi Arabia) Saud Zidan	(Saudi Arabia) Al-Nassr	End of loan	
30 June 2021	MF	20	(Saudi Arabia) Thaar Al-Otaibi	(Saudi Arabia) Al-Hilal	End of loan	
30 June 2021	FW	99	(Sweden) Carlos Strandberg	(Saudi Arabia) Al-Hazem	End of loan	
1 July 2021	DF	88	(Saudi Arabia) Nader Al-Sharari	(Saudi Arabia) Al-Shabab	Free	
25 July 2021	MF	32	(Bosnia and Herzegovina) Benjamin Tatar	(Kuwait) Al-Qadsia	Free	
15 August 2021	DF	91	(Algeria) Mehdi Tahrat	(Qatar) Al-Gharafa	Free	
22 August 2021	GK	–	(Saudi Arabia) Nawaf Al-Mathami	(Saudi Arabia) Jarash	Free	
22 August 2021	DF	–	(Saudi Arabia) Abdulrahman Al Medwah	(Saudi Arabia) Jarash	Free	
13 September 2021	MF	29	(Tunisia) Karim Aouadhi	(Tunisia) Stade Tunisien	Free	
11 February 2022	MF	–	(Saudi Arabia) Mohammed Al-Qahtani	(Greece) Olympiacos B	Free	

=== Loans out ===
Start date	End date	Position	No.	Player	To club	Fee	Ref.
27 August 2021	End of season	MF	16	(Saudi Arabia) Musab Habkor	(Saudi Arabia) Al-Kawkab	None	
31 January 2022	End of season	MF	99	(Republic of the Congo) Prestige Mboungou	(Serbia) Metalac	None	

== Pre-season ==
26 July 2021 Friendly	Abha (Saudi Arabia)	0–1	(Egypt) Ismaily	Alexandria, Egypt
16:00 EGY		Report	Abdel Samiae 44'	Stadium: Borg El Arab Reserve Stadium

29 July 2021 Friendly	Abha (Saudi Arabia)	1–2	(Egypt) Zamalek	Alexandria, Egypt
18:00 EGY	Al-Amri 69'	Report	Bencharki 36'; Hamdy 65'	Stadium: Borg El Arab Reserve Stadium

6 August 2021 Friendly	Al-Ahli (Saudi Arabia)	0–2	(Saudi Arabia) Abha	Jeddah, Saudi Arabia
19:00 AST		Report	Al-Zowayed 38' (pen.), 61'	Stadium: King Abdullah Sports City Reserve Stadium

== Competitions ==
=== Overview ===
Competition	Record							
Competition	G	W	D	L	GF	GA	GD	Win %
Pro League	30	9	8	13	27	43	−16	30.00
King Cup	1	0	0	1	0	4	−4	0.00
Total	31	9	8	14	27	47	−20	29.03

Updated to match played 27 June 2022
Source: Competitions

=== Pro League ===
==== League table ====
Pos	Team	Pld	W	D	L	GF	GA	GD	Pts	Qualification or relegation
7	Al-Raed	30	10	6	14	35	45	−10	36	
8	Al-Fateh	30	9	8	13	45	41	+4	35 (Note: Head-to-head points: Al-Fateh 5, Abha 5, Al-Fayha 4. Head-to-head goal difference: Al-Fateh +1, Abha –1.)	
9	Abha	30	9	8	13	27	43	−16	35	
10	Al-Fayha	30	8	11	11	21	24	−3	35	Qualification for AFC Champions League group stage (Note: Al-Fayha qualified for the AFC Champions League play-off round as 2021–22 King Cup winners.)
11	Al-Ettifaq	30	8	10	12	40	47	−7	34 (Note: Head-to-head points: Al-Ettifaq 3, Al-Taawoun 3. Head-to-head goal difference: Al-Ettifaq +2, Al-Taawoun –2.)	

Source: spl.com
Rules for classification: 1) Points; 2) Head-to-head points; 3) Head-to-head goal difference; 4) Total goal difference; 5) Total goals scored; 6) Fair-play points (Note: Head-to-head record is used only after all the matches between the teams in question have been played).

==== Results summary ====
Overall								Home						Away					
Pld	W	D	L	GF	GA	GD	Pts	W	D	L	GF	GA	GD	W	D	L	GF	GA	GD
30	9	8	13	27	43	−16	35	7	5	3	17	16	+1	2	3	10	10	27	−17

Last updated: 27 June 2022.
Source: spl.com.sa

==== Results by round ====
Round	1	2	3	4	5	6	7	8	9	10	11	12	13	14	15	16	17	18	19	20	21	22	23	24	25	26	27	28	29	30
Ground	H	A	H	A	A	H	H	A	H	A	A	H	H	A	H	A	H	A	H	H	A	A	H	A	H	H	A	A	H	A
Result	W	L	D	L	L	L	L	W	W	L	L	W	D	D	W	D	W	W	L	W	L	L	W	L	D	D	D	L	D	L
Position	3	8	9	13	14	15	15	14	13	13	14	11	11	13	9	8	8	7	8	6	6	6	6	7	6	7	7	9	8	9

Updated to match(es) played on 27 June 2022. Source: spl.com.sa
A = Away; H = Home; W = Win; D = Draw; L = Loss

==== Matches ====
All times are local, AST (UTC+3).

Win Draw Loss Postponed

12 August 2021 1	Abha	2–1	Al-Shabab	Abha
19:15	Bguir 9'; Amr (yellow card) 15' te Vrede 41' (pen.), (yellow card) 45+5'; Al-Zowayed (yellow card) 90'	Report	Banega 57' (pen.); Lichnovsky (yellow card) 79'	Stadium: Prince Sultan bin Abdul Aziz Stadium; Attendance: 2,219; Referee: Mohammed Al-Hoaish

20 August 2021 2	Al-Batin	2–1	Abha	Hafar al-Batin
19:05	El Jebli 16'; Rayhi (yellow card) 29'; Chaves (yellow card) 45+2'; Al-Shammari (yellow card) 72'; Abreu 90+5'	Report	Al-Qaydhi (yellow card) 21'; Amr (yellow card) 42'; Bguir (yellow card) 54'; Al-Jumayah (yellow card) 62' te Vrede (yellow card) 83'; Atouchi 89'	Stadium: Al-Batin Club Stadium; Attendance: 1,102; Referee: Sultan Al-Harbi

26 August 2021 3	Abha	1–1	Al-Ettifaq	Abha
19:05	te Vrede 90+3'	Report	Quaison 9'; Kiss (yellow card) 33'; Al Salem (yellow card) 77'	Stadium: Prince Sultan bin Abdul Aziz Stadium; Attendance: 499; Referee: Mohammed Al-Harbi

11 September 2021 4	Al-Ittihad	6–1	Abha	Jeddah
20:35	Abdulhamid (yellow card) 14'; Coronado 21'; Romarinho 40', 80'; Al-Shamrani 44'; El Ahmadi (yellow card) 74'; Al-Muwallad 89'; Camara 90+1'	Report	Bguir 42'	Stadium: King Abdullah Sports City; Attendance: 29,982; Referee: Ahmed Al-Rumaikhani

18 September 2021 5	Al-Hazem	2–0	Abha	Ar Rass
18:45	Al-Najei (yellow card) 28'; Atouchi 36' (o.g.); Alison (yellow card) 41'; Tiago (yellow card) 62'; Asselah (yellow card) 69'; Bakheet (yellow card) 80'; Strandberg (yellow card) 83'; John 87'	Report	Al-Zowayed (yellow card) 38'	Stadium: Al-Hazem Club Stadium; Attendance: 691; Referee: Sami Al-Jires

24 September 2021 6	Abha	1–3	Damac	Abha
18:40	Al Hamsal (yellow card) 44' te Vrede 63'; Atouchi (yellow card) 90'	Report	Caktaš 17', 86'; Al-Najjar (yellow card) 45+3'; Munshi (yellow card) 59'; Zelaya 74', (yellow card) 75'; Majrashi (yellow card) 90+1'	Stadium: Prince Sultan bin Abdul Aziz Stadium; Attendance: 3,234; Referee: Majed Al-Shamrani

30 September 2021 7	Abha	1–3	Al-Nassr	Abha
18:35	Al-Amri (yellow card) 17' (yellow-red card) 63'; Atouchi (yellow card) 72' (yellow-red card) 90+6', (goal) 75'	Report	Talisca 18', 39', (yellow card) 56'; Lajami (yellow card) 49'; Al-Hassan (yellow card) 67'; Al-Khaibari (yellow card) 74'; Aboubakar 89'	Stadium: Prince Sultan bin Abdul Aziz Stadium; Attendance: 6,203; Referee: Faisal Al-Blwi

16 October 2021 8	Al-Tai	0–1	Abha	Ha'il
18:20	Al-Khalaf (yellow card) 37'; Majrashi (yellow card) 56'	Report	Al-Jumayah (yellow card) 9'; Sharahili 45+2', (yellow card) 84'; Al-Qaydhi (yellow card) 58'; Al Hamsal (yellow card) 90+2'	Stadium: Prince Abdul Aziz bin Musa'ed Stadium; Attendance: 4,717; Referee: Shukri Al-Hanfoush

23 October 2021 9	Abha	3–1	Al-Fateh	Abha
18:20	te Vrede 3'; Al-Jumayah 7'; Al-Kunaydiri (yellow card) 68'; Bguir 75', (yellow card) 76'	Report	Santini (yellow card) 14'; Cueva 42' (pen.)	Stadium: Prince Sultan bin Abdul Aziz Stadium; Attendance: 1,238; Referee: Mohammed Al-Beredi

30 October 2021 10	Al-Taawoun	2–0	Abha	Buraidah
18:05	Tawamba 10', 90+4'; Al-Amri (yellow card) 78'; Al-Rashidi (yellow card) 86'; Al-Baqaawi (yellow card) 90+4'	Report	Suárez (yellow card) 29'; Al-Qaydhi (yellow card) 43'; Matić (yellow card) 78'	Stadium: King Abdullah Sport City Stadium; Attendance: 3,415; Referee: Christian Ferreyra (Uruguay)

4 November 2021 11	Al-Faisaly	1–0	Abha	Al Majma'ah
17:55	Faik 20'; Al-Amri (yellow card) 32'; Silva (yellow card) 45+1'	Report	Bguir (yellow card) 44'; Suárez (yellow card) 47'; Al Hamsal (yellow card) 57'	Stadium: Al Majma'ah Sports City; Attendance: 6,094; Referee: Sami Al-Jires

21 November 2021 12	Abha	2–0	Al-Ahli	Abha
15:30	Suárez (yellow card) 61' te Vrede 75'; Bguir 85' (pen.)	Report	Bradarić (yellow card) 53'; Dankler (yellow card) 72' (yellow-red card) 80'; Asiri (yellow card) 87'	Stadium: Prince Sultan bin Abdul Aziz Stadium; Attendance: 5,176; Referee: Sultan Al-Harbi

28 November 2021 13	Abha	1–1	Al-Hilal	Abha
15:30	Bguir 43'; Suárez (yellow card) 82'	Report	Marega 18'; Gomis (yellow card) 36'; Al-Shehri (yellow card) 83'	Stadium: Prince Sultan bin Abdul Aziz Stadium; Attendance: 12,243; Referee: Turki Al-Khudhayr

25 December 2021 14	Al-Fayha	0–0	Abha	Al Majma'ah
17:55	Ryller (yellow card) 45'; Al-Safri (yellow card) 51'	Report	Atouchi (yellow card) 48'	Stadium: Al Majma'ah Sports City; Attendance: 6,116; Referee: Mohammed Al-Qarni

1 January 2022 15	Abha	1–0	Al-Raed	Abha
15:45	te Vrede (yellow card) 13'; René 62' (o.g.); Bguir (yellow card) 80'; Matić (yellow card) 90+5'	Report	Al-Harbi (yellow card) 84'; Al-Qahtani (yellow card) 90+5'	Stadium: Prince Sultan bin Abdul Aziz Stadium; Attendance: 141; Referee: Mohammed Al-Esmaiel

8 January 2022 16	Al-Shabab	1–1	Abha	Riyadh
18:00	Lichnovsky (yellow card) 36'; Al-Barakah 58' (o.g.); Banega (yellow card) 62'	Report	Al-Qayd 8'; Mboungou (yellow card) 56'	Stadium: Prince Faisal bin Fahd Stadium; Attendance: 5,818; Referee: Mohammed Al-Hoaish

14 January 2022 17	Abha	1–0	Al-Batin	Abha
15:50	Atouchi (yellow card) 33'; Afaneh (yellow card) 50'; Sharahili 90+5', (yellow card) 90+6'; Al-Habib (yellow card) 90+6'	Report	Al-Alawi (yellow card) 38'; Al-Mutairi (yellow card) 90+6'	Stadium: Prince Sultan bin Abdul Aziz Stadium; Attendance: 425; Referee: Faisal Al-Blwi

20 January 2022 18	Al-Ettifaq	1–2	Abha	Dammam
18:00	H. Al-Ghamdi (yellow card) 34'; Al-Mowalad (yellow card) 85'; Al Salis (red card) 90+4'; Al Salem 90+8'	Report	Al-Amri (yellow card) 29', (goal) 81'; Amr 37'; Mhamdi (yellow card) 67'	Stadium: Prince Mohamed bin Fahd Stadium; Attendance: 2,815; Referee: Shukri Al-Hanfoush

6 February 2022 19	Abha	0–4	Al-Ittihad	Abha
16:05	Ifa (yellow card) 34'	Report	Hawsawi (yellow card) 41'; Romarinho 61' (pen.); Hamdallah 79', 90+4' (pen.); Al-Bishi 80'	Stadium: Prince Sultan bin Abdul Aziz Stadium; Attendance: 7,316; Referee: Khaled Al-Teris

11 February 2022 20	Abha	2–1	Al-Hazem	Abha
16:05	Al-Jumayah 65', 90+5'	Report	Al-Khalaf 9'; Al-Aazmi (yellow card) 33'	Stadium: Prince Sultan bin Abdul Aziz Stadium; Attendance: 252; Referee: Mohammed Al-Beredi

19 February 2022 21	Damac	3–2	Abha	Abha
16:10	Zelaya 30' (pen.); Soudani 51'; Vittor 67'; Al-Shamrani (yellow card) 77'	Report	Matić 15'; Ifa 43'; Bguir (yellow card) 90'	Stadium: Prince Sultan bin Abdul Aziz Stadium; Attendance: 4,735; Referee: Shukri Al-Hanfoush

26 February 2022 22	Al-Nassr	2–1	Abha	Riyadh
18:25	Ifa 37' (o.g.); Funes Mori (yellow card) 72'; Aboubakar 90+7'	Report	Matić (yellow card) 7', (goal) 69'; Meziani (yellow card) 13'; Al-Barakah (yellow card) 58'; Atouchi (yellow card) 67'; Al-Qaydhi (yellow card) 90+5'; Al-Shammeri (yellow card) 90+6'	Stadium: Mrsool Park; Attendance: 6,983; Referee: Sami Al-Jires

4 March 2022 23	Abha	1–0	Al-Tai	Abha
16:15	Matić 45+3'; Atouchi (yellow card) 56'	Report	Ali (yellow card) 28'; Al-Jubairi (yellow card) 30'; Al-Zubaidi (yellow card) 90+4'	Stadium: Prince Sultan bin Abdul Aziz Stadium; Attendance: 353; Referee: Khalid Al-Juhani

10 March 2022 24	Al-Fateh	3–0	Abha	Al-Hasa
18:25	Bendebka 67'; Santini 73', 79', (yellow card) 83'	Report	Al Hamsal (yellow card) 33'; Ifa (red card) 63'; Amr (yellow card) 67' (yellow-red card) 90+7'; Bguir (yellow card) 77'	Stadium: Prince Abdullah bin Jalawi Stadium; Attendance: 11,382; Referee: Mohammed Al-Esmaiel

19 March 2022 25	Abha	1–1	Al-Taawoun	Abha
18:55	Bguir 44' (pen.); Atouchi (yellow card) 60'; Al-Jumayah (yellow card) 88'	Report	Fathi 17', (yellow card) 90+1'; Al-Oyayari (yellow card) 69'; Al-Bakr (yellow card) 90+6'	Stadium: Prince Sultan bin Abdul Aziz Stadium; Attendance: 2,109; Referee: Wilmar Roldán (Colombia)

6 May 2022 26	Abha	0–0	Al-Faisaly	Abha
19:10		Report		Stadium: Prince Sultan bin Abdul Aziz Stadium; Attendance: 1,026; Referee: Khaled Al-Teris

22 May 2022 27	Al-Ahli	1–1	Abha	Jeddah
21:00	Kom (yellow card) 9'; Eduardo 44'; Ghareeb (yellow card) 62'; Al-Mogren (yellow card) 85'	Report	Bguir 37'; Mhamdi (yellow card) 90+4'	Stadium: King Abdullah Sports City; Attendance: 19,441; Referee: Ahmad Al-Rumaikhani

29 May 2022 28	Al-Hilal	2–0	Abha	Riyadh
21:00	Ighalo (yellow card) 30', (goal) 80'; Al-Bulaihi 55'; Al-Faraj (yellow card) 72'	Report	Sharahili (yellow card) 44'; Al-Amri (yellow card) 64'	Stadium: Prince Faisal bin Fahd Stadium; Attendance: 8,830; Referee: Artur Soares Dias (Portugal)

23 June 2022 29	Abha	0–0	Al-Fayha	Abha
21:00		Report	Al-Baqawi (yellow card) 40'; Lopes (yellow card) 84'	Stadium: Prince Sultan bin Abdul Aziz Stadium; Attendance: 667; Referee: Khaled Al-Teris

27 June 2022 30	Al-Raed	1–0	Abha	Buraidah
21:00	El Berkaoui 21'; Al-Qahtani (yellow card) 87'; Al-Farhan (yellow card) 90+3'	Report	Ifa (yellow card) 69'	Stadium: King Abdullah Sport City Stadium; Attendance: 6,524; Referee: Majed Al-Shamrani

=== King Cup ===
All times are local, AST (UTC+3).

21 December 2021 Round of 16	Al-Fayha	4–0	Abha	Al Majma'ah
15:05	Tachtsidis 19' (pen.); Ryller (yellow card) 25'; Moutari (yellow card) 39', (goal) 47'; Al-Abdulmenem 44'; Lopes 83'	Report	Mboungou (yellow card) 18'; Atouchi (yellow card) 89'	Stadium: Al Majma'ah Sports City; Referee: Mohammed Al-Harbi

== Statistics ==
=== Appearances ===
Last updated on 27 June 2022.

No.	Pos	Nat	Player	Total		Pro League		King Cup	
No.	Pos	Nat	Player	Apps	Goals	Apps	Goals	Apps	Goals
Goalkeepers
1	GK	(Saudi Arabia) KSA	Abdullah Al-Shammeri	7	0	6+1	0	0	0
12	GK	(Morocco) MAR	Abdelali Mhamdi	25	0	24	0	1	0
33	GK	(Saudi Arabia) KSA	Mansour Jawhar	1	0	0+1	0	0	0
34	GK	(Saudi Arabia) KSA	Ali Al-Mazyadi	0	0	0	0	0	0
Defenders
2	DF	(Tunisia) TUN	Bilel Ifa	11	1	11	1	0	0
3	DF	(Saudi Arabia) KSA	Abdullah Al-Zori	10	0	10	0	0	0
6	DF	(Saudi Arabia) KSA	Karam Barnawi	4	0	1+3	0	0	0
13	DF	(Saudi Arabia) KSA	Mohammed Al-Kunaydiri	19	0	10+9	0	0	0
19	DF	(Morocco) MAR	Amine Atouchi	26	2	25	2	1	0
31	DF	(Saudi Arabia) KSA	Sari Amr	24	1	20+3	1	1	0
39	DF	(Saudi Arabia) KSA	Saeed Al Hamsal	20	0	17+2	0	1	0
77	DF	(Saudi Arabia) KSA	Ahmed Al-Habib	2	0	1+1	0	0	0
98	DF	(Saudi Arabia) KSA	Muhannad Al-Qaydhi	16	0	14+2	0	0	0
Midfielders
7	MF	(Saudi Arabia) KSA	Saleh Al-Amri	30	1	26+3	1	1	0
8	MF	(Serbia) SRB	Uroš Matić	29	3	28	3	1	0
10	MF	(Tunisia) TUN	Saad Bguir	28	7	26+1	7	0+1	0
11	MF	(Saudi Arabia) KSA	Jehad Al-Zowayed	11	0	5+5	0	0+1	0
14	MF	(Saudi Arabia) KSA	Fahad Al-Jumayah	20	3	18+2	3	0	0
15	MF	(Saudi Arabia) KSA	Mutair Al-Zahrani	2	0	1+1	0	0	0
17	MF	(Algeria) ALG	Tayeb Meziani	8	0	4+4	0	0	0
18	MF	(Saudi Arabia) KSA	Nawaf Al-Sadi	1	0	0+1	0	0	0
23	MF	(Saudi Arabia) KSA	Abdulrahman Al-Barakah	15	0	12+2	0	1	0
29	MF	(Saudi Arabia) KSA	Abdullah Al-Qahtani	10	0	0+10	0	0	0
45	MF	(Saudi Arabia) KSA	Hassan Al-Qayd	10	1	3+7	1	0	0
80	MF	(Saudi Arabia) KSA	Tariq Al-Shahrani	1	0	0+1	0	0	0
89	MF	(Saudi Arabia) KSA	Riyadh Sharahili	25	2	21+3	2	1	0
Forwards
9	FW	(Suriname) SUR	Mitchell te Vrede	29	5	20+8	5	1	0
70	FW	(Jordan) JOR	Muath Afaneh	11	0	4+6	0	0+1	0
90	FW	(Saudi Arabia) KSA	Omar Al-Ruwaili	9	0	0+8	0	0+1	0
Players sent out on loan this season
16	MF	(Saudi Arabia) KSA	Musab Habkor	0	0	0	0	0	0
99	MF	(Republic of the Congo) CGO	Prestige Mboungou	16	0	13+2	0	1	0
Player who made an appearance this season but have left the club
5	DF	(Spain) ESP	Dani Suárez	13	0	11+1	0	1	0

=== Goalscorers ===
Rank	No.	Pos	Nat	Name	Pro League	King Cup	Total
1	10	MF	(Tunisia)	Saad Bguir	7	0	7
2	9	FW	(Suriname)	Mitchell te Vrede	5	0	5
3	8	MF	(Serbia)	Uroš Matić	3	0	3
3	14	MF	(Saudi Arabia)	Fahad Al-Jumayah	3	0	3
5	19	DF	(Morocco)	Amine Atouchi	2	0	2
5	89	MF	(Saudi Arabia)	Riyadh Sharahili	2	0	2
7	2	DF	(Tunisia)	Bilel Ifa	1	0	1
7	7	MF	(Saudi Arabia)	Saleh Al-Amri	1	0	1
7	31	DF	(Saudi Arabia)	Sari Amr	1	0	1
7	45	MF	(Saudi Arabia)	Hassan Al-Qayd	1	0	1
Own goal					1	0	1
Total					27	0	27

Last Updated: 22 May 2022

=== Assists ===
Rank	No.	Pos	Nat	Name	Pro League	King Cup	Total
1	7	MF	(Saudi Arabia)	Saleh Al-Amri	7	0	7
2	10	MF	(Tunisia)	Saad Bguir	2	0	2
2	13	DF	(Saudi Arabia)	Mohammed Al-Kunaydiri	2	0	2
4	8	MF	(Serbia)	Uroš Matić	1	0	1
4	9	FW	(Suriname)	Mitchell te Vrede	1	0	1
4	11	MF	(Saudi Arabia)	Jehad Al-Zowayed	1	0	1
4	23	MF	(Saudi Arabia)	Abdulrahman Al-Barakah	1	0	1
4	31	DF	(Saudi Arabia)	Sari Amr	1	0	1
4	39	DF	(Saudi Arabia)	Saeed Al Hamsal	1	0	1
4	99	MF	(Republic of the Congo)	Prestige Mboungou	1	0	1
Total					18	0	18

Last Updated: 4 March 2022

=== Clean sheets ===
Rank	No.	Pos	Nat	Name	Pro League	King Cup	Total
1	12	GK	(Morocco)	Abdelali Mhamdi	7	0	7
2	1	GK	(Saudi Arabia)	Abdullah Al-Shammeri	1	0	1
Total					8	0	8

Last Updated: 23 June 2022
