= 2022–23 Abha Club season =

Abha
2022–23 season
- President: Ahmed Al-Hodithy
- Manager: Sven Vandenbroeck (until 8 October); Roel Coumans (from 30 October)
- Stadium: Prince Sultan bin Abdul Aziz Stadium
- Pro League: 12th
- King Cup: Quarter-finals (knocked out by Al-Nassr)
- Top goalscorer: League: Saad Bguir (8 goals); All: Saad Bguir (9 goals)
- Highest home attendance: 13,422 (vs. Al-Hilal, 27 May 2023)
- Lowest home attendance: 386 (vs. Al-Wehda, 24 February 2023)
- Average home league attendance: 3,597

The 2022–23 season was Abha's sixth non-consecutive season in the Pro League and their 57th season in existence. The club participated in the Pro League and the King Cup.

The season covered the period from 1 July 2022 to 30 June 2023.

== Players ==
=== Squad information ===
As of 1 February 2023

Note: Flags indicate national team as defined under FIFA eligibility rules; some limited exceptions apply. Players may hold more than one non-FIFA nationality.

No.	Pos.	Nation	Player
1	GK	KSA	Abdullah Al-Shammeri
3	DF	KSA	Abdullah Al-Zori (captain)
4	DF	IRQ	Saad Natiq
6	MF	KSA	Abdulrahman Al-Barakah
7	MF	KSA	Saleh Al-Amri
8	MF	SRB	Uroš Matić
9	FW	KSA	Abdulfattah Adam (on loan from Al-Nassr)
10	MF	TUN	Saad Bguir
12	GK	KSA	Abdulrahman Al-Bouq
13	DF	KSA	Mohammed Al-Kunaydiri
14	MF	KSA	Fahad Al-Jumayah
15	MF	KSA	Mutair Al-Zahrani
16	GK	CMR	Devis Epassy
17	MF	ALG	Tayeb Meziani
18	MF	KSA	Nawaf Al-Sadi

No.	Pos.	Nation	Player
19	DF	MAR	Amine Atouchi
20	FW	ECU	Felipe Caicedo
21	MF	KSA	Zakaria Sami
23	MF	KSA	Nasser Al-Omran
26	MF	KSA	Musab Habkor
27	MF	KSA	Hassan Al-Qayd
31	DF	KSA	Sari Amr
32	MF	KSA	Sulaiman Asiri
33	GK	KSA	Mansour Jawhar
34	MF	NED	Dries Saddiki
39	DF	KSA	Saeed Al Hamsal
56	MF	KSA	Mohammed Al-Qahtani
77	DF	KSA	Ahmed Al-Habib
86	MF	KSA	Aseel Al-Harbi
88	MF	KSA	Saad Al-Selouli

=== Out on loan ===
Note: Flags indicate national team as defined under FIFA eligibility rules; some limited exceptions apply. Players may hold more than one non-FIFA nationality.

No.	Pos.	Nation	Player
90	FW	KSA	Omar Al-Ruwaili (at Al-Riyadh until 30 June 2023)

== Transfers and loans ==
=== Transfers in ===
Entry date	Position	No.	Player	From club	Fee	Ref.
30 June 2022	MF	26	(Saudi Arabia) Musab Habkor	(Saudi Arabia) Al-Kawkab	End of loan	
30 June 2022	MF	47	(Republic of the Congo) Prestige Mboungou	(Serbia) Metalac Gornji Milanovac	End of loan	
3 July 2022	MF	21	(Saudi Arabia) Zakaria Sami	(Saudi Arabia) Al-Batin	Free	
5 July 2022	MF	88	(Saudi Arabia) Saad Al-Selouli	(Saudi Arabia) Al-Ettifaq	Free	
30 July 2022	GK	–	(Switzerland) Noam Baumann	(Switzerland) Lugano	Free	
6 August 2022	GK	16	(Cameroon) Devis Epassy	(Greece) OFI Crete	Free	
24 August 2022	DF	4	(Iraq) Saad Natiq	(Saudi Arabia) Al-Batin	Free	
28 August 2022	FW	20	(Ecuador) Felipe Caicedo	(Italy) Genoa	Free	
1 January 2023	GK	12	(Saudi Arabia) Abdulrahman Al-Bouq	(Saudi Arabia) Al-Ansar	Free	
28 January 2023	MF	23	(Saudi Arabia) Nasser Al-Omran	(Saudi Arabia) Al-Shabab	Undisclosed	
28 January 2023	MF	56	(Saudi Arabia) Mohammed Al-Qahtani	(Greece) Olympiacos B	Free	
6 February 2023	MF	34	(Netherlands) Dries Saddiki	(Qatar) Umm Salal	Free	
15 February 2023	MF	86	(Saudi Arabia) Aseel Al-Harbi	(Portugal) Portimonense	Free	

=== Loans in ===
Start date	End date	Position	No.	Player	From club	Fee	Ref.
18 August 2022	End of season	FW	9	(Saudi Arabia) Abdulfattah Adam	(Saudi Arabia) Al-Nassr	$266,000	
2 September 2022	End of season	MF	11	(Mozambique) Luís Miquissone	(Egypt) Al-Ahly	Undisclosed	

=== Transfers out ===
Exit date	Position	No.	Player	To club	Fee	Ref.
30 June 2022	MF	29	(Saudi Arabia) Abdullah Al-Qahtani	(Saudi Arabia) Al-Faisaly	End of loan	
27 July 2022	FW	70	(Jordan) Muath Afaneh	(Jordan) Al-Salt	Free	
28 July 2022	MF	–	(Saudi Arabia) Abdullah Nasser	(Saudi Arabia) Al-Bukiryah	Free	
30 July 2022	FW	9	(Suriname) Mitchell te Vrede	(United Arab Emirates) Al-Dhafra	Free	
2 August 2022	DF	98	(Saudi Arabia) Muhannad Al-Qaydhi	(Saudi Arabia) Al-Fayha	Free	
6 August 2022	GK	–	(Switzerland) Noam Baumann		Released	
16 August 2022	MF	11	(Saudi Arabia) Jehad Al-Zowayed	(Saudi Arabia) Al-Sahel	Free	
21 August 2022	DF	6	(Saudi Arabia) Karam Barnawi	(Saudi Arabia) Al-Ain	Free	
25 August 2022	GK	12	(Morocco) Abdelali Mhamdi	(Morocco) Maghreb de Fès	Free	
28 August 2022	MF	47	(Republic of the Congo) Prestige Mboungou	(United Arab Emirates) Ajman	Undisclosed	
1 September 2022	DF	2	(Tunisia) Bilel Ifa	Kuwait	Free	
20 September 2022	GK	34	(Saudi Arabia) Ali Al-Mazyadi	(Saudi Arabia) Al-Nahda	Free	
28 January 2023	MF	89	(Saudi Arabia) Riyadh Sharahili	(Saudi Arabia) Al-Shabab	Undisclosed	

=== Loans out ===
Start date	End date	Position	No.	Player	To club	Fee	Ref.
16 January 2023	End of season	FW	90	(Saudi Arabia) Omar Al-Ruwaili	(Saudi Arabia) Al-Riyadh	None	

== Pre-season ==
25 July 2022 Friendly	Abha (Saudi Arabia)	10–0	(Austria) SV Schlitters	Schlitters, Austria
17:30 CEST		Report		Stadium: Sportplatz Schlitters

30 July 2022 Friendly	Abha (Saudi Arabia)	1–0	(United Arab Emirates) Al-Wahda	Austria
18:00 CEST	Al-Qayd 56'	Report

31 July 2022 Friendly	Abha (Saudi Arabia)	0–0	(United Arab Emirates) Al-Ain	Andorf, Austria
18:30 CEST		Report		Stadium: DAXL-Arena

3 August 2022 Friendly	Abha (Saudi Arabia)	12–0	(Austria) SK Rum	Innsbruck, Austria
19:00 CEST		Report		Stadium: Sportzentrum Rum

7 August 2022 Friendly	Abha (Saudi Arabia)	1–1	(Saudi Arabia) Al-Fayha	Austria
15:00 CEST	Paulinho 32'	Report	Bguir 90' (pen.)

14 August 2022 Friendly	Abha (Saudi Arabia)	7–0	(Saudi Arabia) Najran	Abha, Saudi Arabia
16:30 AST	Al-Amri; Atouchi, Bguir, Ifa; Al-Qayd	Report		Stadium: Prince Sultan bin Abdul Aziz Reserve Stadium

19 August 2022 Friendly	Abha (Saudi Arabia)	1–2	(Saudi Arabia) Al-Ittihad	Jeddah, Saudi Arabia
19:30 AST	Sami 4'	Report	Henrique 19'; Hamed 39'	Stadium: Al-Ittihad Club Stadium

== Competitions ==
=== Overview ===
Competition	Record							
Competition	G	W	D	L	GF	GA	GD	Win %
Pro League	30	10	3	17	33	52	−19	33.33
King Cup	2	1	0	1	5	6	−1	50.00
Total	32	11	3	18	38	58	−20	34.38

Updated to match played 31 May 2023
Source: Competitions

=== Pro League ===
==== League table ====
Pos	Team	Pld	W	D	L	GF	GA	GD	Pts	Qualification or relegation
10	Al-Raed	30	9	7	14	41	49	−8	34 (Note: Al-Tai finished ahead of Al-Raed on head-to-head points: Al-Tai: 4 pts, Al-Raed: 1 pts (Al-Raed 0–2 Al-Tai, Al-Tai 2–2 Al-Raed).)	
11	Al-Fayha (Note: Al-Fayha qualified for the AFC Champions League group stage as the 2021–22 King Cup winners.)	30	8	9	13	31	43	−12	33 (Note: Al-Fayha finished ahead of Abha on head-to-head points: Al-Fayha: 4 pts, Abha: 1 pts (Abha 1–1 Al-Fayha, Al-Fayha 2–0 Abha).)	Qualified for the AFC Champions League group stage
12	Abha	30	10	3	17	33	52	−19	33	
13	Al-Wehda	30	8	8	14	26	43	−17	32	
14	Al-Khaleej	30	9	4	17	30	44	−14	31	

Updated to match(es) played on 31 May 2023. Source: SPL
Rules for classification: 1) Points; 2) Head-to-head points; 3) Head-to-head goal difference; 4) Total goal difference; 5) Total goals scored; 6) Fair-play points (Note: Head-to-head record is used only after all the matches between the teams in question have been played).

==== Results summary ====
Overall								Home						Away					
Pld	W	D	L	GF	GA	GD	Pts	W	D	L	GF	GA	GD	W	D	L	GF	GA	GD
30	10	3	17	33	52	−19	33	7	3	5	20	24	−4	3	0	12	13	28	−15

Last updated: 31 May 2023.
Source: spl.com.sa

==== Results by round ====
Round	1	2	3	4	5	6	7	8	9	10	11	12	13	14	15	16	17	18	19	20	21	22	23	24	25	26	27	28	29	30
Ground	H	H	A	H	A	H	A	A	H	A	H	A	H	A	H	A	A	H	A	H	A	H	H	A	H	A	H	A	H	A
Result	W	L	L	D	L	L	W	W	W	W	L	L	W	L	W	L	L	L	L	D	L	D	W	L	W	L	W	L	L	L
Position	6	10	12	10	13	14	12	9	8	7	8	9	6	7	7	8	9	9	11	12	12	11	9	10	10	10	9	11	11	12

Updated to match(es) played on 31 May 2023. Source: spl.com.sa
A = Away; H = Home; W = Win; D = Draw; L = Loss

==== Matches ====
All times are local, AST (UTC+3).

Win Draw Loss Postponed

27 August 2022 1	Abha	2–1	Al-Raed	Abha
21:00	Adam 51'; Bguir 60'; Meziani (yellow card) 80'; Sharahili (yellow card) 87'	Report	Salem 34'; R. Santos (yellow card) 76'	Stadium: Prince Sultan bin Abdul Aziz Stadium; Attendance: 932; Referee: Sultan Al-Harbi

1 September 2022 2	Abha	0–4	Al-Shabab	Abha
21:00	Al Hamsal (yellow card) 59'; Al-Jumayah (yellow card) 62'	Report	Guanca 25' (pen.); Mina 39'; Carlos 44'; Bahebri 90'	Stadium: Prince Sultan bin Abdul Aziz Stadium; Attendance: 6,909; Referee: Mohammed Al-Harbi

8 September 2022 3	Al-Wehda	1–0	Abha	Mecca
21:00	Bukhari (yellow card) 25'; Natiq 49' (o.g.); Al-Sawadi (yellow card) 65'; Beauguel (yellow card) 80'	Report	Adam (yellow card) 71'	Stadium: King Abdul Aziz Stadium; Attendance: 3,118; Referee: Faisal Al-Blwi

16 September 2022 4	Abha	1–1	Al-Fayha	Abha
18:50	Al-Qayd (yellow card) 18'; Al-Amri 65', (yellow card) 90+6'	Report	Al-Khaibari (yellow card) 52'; Nwakaeme 87'	Stadium: Prince Sultan bin Abdul Aziz Stadium; Attendance: 917; Referee: Mohammed Al-Esmaiel

2 October 2022 5	Al-Fateh	3–0	Abha	Al-Hasa
21:00	Buhimed 5'; Al-Buraikan 61'; Batna (yellow card) 80'; Al-Khulaif 84'	Report		Stadium: Prince Abdullah bin Jalawi Stadium; Attendance: 3,705; Referee: Sami Al-Jires

7 October 2022 6	Abha	0–3	Al-Nassr	Abha
18:30	Sami (yellow card) 21'; Adam (yellow card) 87'	Report	Gustavo 5', (yellow card) 42'; S. Al-Ghanam 49'; Yahya 90'	Stadium: Prince Sultan bin Abdul Aziz Stadium; Attendance: 13,250; Referee: Fábio Veríssimo (Portugal)

11 October 2022 7	Al-Taawoun	1–3	Abha	Buraidah
18:15	Tawamba 44', (yellow card) 90+6'	Report	Sami 57', (yellow card) 81'; Caicedo 71'; Al-Selouli 90+10'	Stadium: King Abdullah Sport City Stadium; Attendance: 5,076; Referee: Sultan Al-Harbi

16 October 2022 8	Al-Batin	1–3	Abha	Hafar al-Batin
17:45	Nasser (yellow card) 59'; Awad (red card) 71'; Fawaz (yellow card) 74'; Al-Shamlan 80' (pen.); Fraih (yellow card) 90+3'	Report	Al-Amri 35'; Al-Zori (yellow card) 61'; Bguir 72'; Adam 74'; Al-Jumayah (yellow card) 79'	Stadium: Al-Batin Club Stadium; Attendance: 3,204; Referee: Sami Al-Jires

16 December 2022 9	Abha	2–1	Al-Tai	Abha
15:30	Amr (yellow card) 48'; Bguir 81'; Matić (yellow card) 90+2'; Al-Amri 90+5', (yellow card) 90+13'	Report	Musona (yellow card) 23'; Semedo (yellow card) 57'; Sayoud 75', (red card) 90+12'; Al-Qumairi (yellow card) 85'; Al-Harabi (yellow card) 89'	Stadium: Prince Sultan bin Abdul Aziz Stadium; Attendance: 600; Referee: Khaled Al-Teris

25 December 2022 10	Al-Adalah	0–2	Abha	Al-Hasa
18:00	Dyrestam (yellow card) 45+2'; Al-Sultan (yellow card) 45+5'; Al-Burayh (yellow card) 46'; Al-Habib (yellow card) 59'; Al-Harbi (yellow card) 90+8'	Report	Al-Sadi 12'; Al-Zori (yellow card) 43'; Amr (yellow card) 45'; Bguir 64'; Natiq (yellow card) 82'	Stadium: Prince Abdullah bin Jalawi Stadium; Attendance: 14,859; Referee: Abdulsamad Bakri

31 December 2022 11	Abha	1–2	Al-Ittihad	Abha
15:30	Al-Amri 72'	Report	Hamdallah 21'; Romarinho 50', (yellow card) 52'; Hamed (yellow card) 56'	Stadium: Prince Sultan bin Abdul Aziz Stadium; Attendance: 12,215; Referee: Anastasios Sidiropoulos (Greece)

7 January 2023 12	Al-Ettifaq	2–1	Abha	Dammam
18:00	Vitinho (yellow card) 57'; Hawsawi 68'; Niakaté 90+7'	Report	Al-Zori 28'; Natiq (yellow card) 38'; Sami (yellow card) 64'	Stadium: Prince Mohamed bin Fahd Stadium; Attendance: 1,225; Referee: Mohammed Al-Hoaish

13 January 2023 13	Abha	2–1	Damac	Abha
15:30	Al-Sadi 54'; Adam (yellow card) 69'; Al-Amri 90'	Report	Chafaï 14'; W. Al-Enezi (yellow card) 90+5'	Stadium: Prince Sultan bin Abdul Aziz Stadium; Attendance: 1,747; Referee: Sultan Al-Harbi

22 January 2023 14	Al-Hilal	2–1	Abha	Riyadh
18:00	Hyun-soo 21'; Cuéllar (yellow card) 50'; S. Al-Dawsari 54' (pen.); Al-Shehri (yellow card) 58'; Al-Hamdan (yellow card) 90+9'; Abdulhamid (yellow card) 90+12'	Report	Adam 29'; Al Hamsal (yellow card) 52'; Caicedo (yellow card) 80'; Atouchi (yellow card) 90+10'	Stadium: Prince Faisal bin Fahd Stadium; Attendance: 3,714; Referee: Georgi Kabakov (Bulgaria)

2 February 2023 15	Abha	2–0	Al-Khaleej	Abha
16:00	Al-Zori (yellow card) 15'; Natiq (yellow card) 40', (goal) 71'; Bguir 81'	Report	Poko (yellow card) 14'; Amaral (yellow card) 17'	Stadium: Prince Sultan bin Abdul Aziz Stadium; Attendance: 569; Referee: Ahmed Al-Rumaikhani

10 February 2023 16	Al-Raed	3–1	Abha	Buraidah
16:00	Đoković 45+2'; Hazazi (yellow card) 59'; M. Al-Dossari (yellow card) 67'; Mitriță (yellow card) 78'; Fouzair 88', 90+13'; Al-Farhan (yellow card) 90+6'	Report	Al-Sadi 41'; Al-Amri (yellow card) 76'	Stadium: King Abdullah Sport City Stadium; Attendance: 1,423; Referee: Sultan Okairy

14 February 2023 17	Al-Shabab	2–0	Abha	Riyadh
18:00	Banega 22'; Carlos 56'	Report	Natiq (yellow card) 71'	Stadium: Prince Faisal bin Fahd Stadium; Attendance: 3,927; Referee: Raed Al-Zahrani

24 February 2023 18	Abha	1–2	Al-Wehda	Abha
16:00	Bukhari 29' (o.g.); Amr (yellow card) 39'	Report	Fajr 9'; Hawsawi 19'; Bukhari (yellow card) 32'; Al Hejji (yellow card) 49'; Rodrigues (yellow card) 74'	Stadium: Prince Sultan bin Abdul Aziz Stadium; Attendance: 386; Referee: Abdulsamad Bakri

2 March 2023 19	Al-Fayha	2–0	Abha	Al Majma'ah
16:00	Paulinho 45+2'; Stojković (yellow card) 85'; Mandash 90+7'	Report	Al-Kunaydiri (yellow card) 90+4'	Stadium: Al Majma'ah Sports City; Attendance: 5,086; Referee: Mohammed Al-Daqqash

10 March 2023 20	Abha	2–2	Al-Fateh	Abha
16:00	Al-Zori 11'; Caicedo 20'; Al-Amri (yellow card) 80'	Report	Batna 50' (pen.), 90+6' (pen.)	Stadium: Prince Sultan bin Abdul Aziz Stadium; Attendance: 725; Referee: Mohammed Al-Beredi

18 March 2023 21	Al-Nassr	2–1	Abha	Riyadh
20:30	Al-Khaibari (yellow card) 33'; Al-Sulaiheem (yellow card) 38'; Ronaldo 78'; Talisca 86' (pen.); S. Al-Ghannam (yellow card) 87'; Konan (yellow card) 90+7'	Report	Adam 26', (yellow card) 85'; Caicedo (yellow card) 32'; Sami (yellow card) 77' (yellow-red card) 80'; Atouchi (yellow card) 79'; Bguir (yellow card) 90+6'	Stadium: Mrsool Park; Attendance: 19,564; Referee: Fernando Rapallini (Argentina)

5 April 2023 22	Abha	1–1	Al-Taawoun	Abha
22:00	Bguir (yellow card) 43'; Atouchi 63'; Natiq (yellow card) 90+7'	Report	Al-Nabit (yellow card) 45'; Al-Rashidi 68'; Naldo (yellow card) 79' (yellow-red card) 85'; Tawamba (yellow card) 90+7'	Stadium: Prince Sultan bin Abdul Aziz Stadium; Attendance: 627; Referee: Raed Al-Zahrani

9 April 2023 23	Abha	3–2	Al-Batin	Abha
22:00	Al-Sadi 6', 77', (yellow card) 78'; Sami 42'; Atouchi (yellow card) 71'; Al-Zori (yellow card) 86'; Al-Omran (yellow card) 88'	Report	Al-Shamlan 38'; Al-Qarni (yellow card) 45'; Pedroza (yellow card) 51'; Saad 90+4'	Stadium: Prince Sultan bin Abdul Aziz Stadium; Attendance: 604; Referee: Mohammed Al-Harbi

27 April 2023 24	Al-Tai	1–0	Abha	Ha'il
19:00	Sayoud 25'; Majrashi (yellow card) 45+1'; Semedo (yellow card) 69'; Musona (yellow card) 84'	Report	Al-Jumayah (yellow card) 15'	Stadium: Prince Abdul Aziz bin Musa'ed Stadium; Attendance: 5,879; Referee: Mohammed Al-Daqqash

2 May 2023 25	Abha	1–0	Al-Adalah	Abha
19:00	Natiq (yellow card) 73'; Bguir 81'; Saddiki (yellow card) 90'	Report	Al Haydar (yellow card) 57'	Stadium: Prince Sultan bin Abdul Aziz Stadium; Attendance: 449; Referee: Abdullah Al-Kharbosh

8 May 2023 26	Al-Ittihad	4–0	Abha	Jeddah
21:30	Romarinho 13', 30'; Hamdallah 18'; Al-Saiari 90+2'	Report	Sami (yellow card) 55'	Stadium: King Abdullah Sports City; Attendance: 39,038; Referee: Nikola Dabanović (Montenegro)

18 May 2023 27	Abha	2–1	Al-Ettifaq	Abha
19:00	Saddiki (yellow card) 44'; Bguir 64', 72' (pen.), (yellow card) 73'; Matić (yellow card) 82'	Report	Velkovski (yellow card) 70'; Al-Mowalad (yellow card) 79'; Niakaté 90+1'	Stadium: Prince Sultan bin Abdul Aziz Stadium; Attendance: 601; Referee: Ahmed Al-Rumaikhani

22 May 2023 28	Damac	1–0	Abha	Abha
19:00	Al-Ammar 56'; Munshi (yellow card) 65'; Nono (yellow card) 72'	Report	Saddiki (yellow card) 42'; Al-Sadi (red card) 57'	Stadium: Prince Sultan bin Abdul Aziz Stadium; Attendance: 2,105; Referee: Abdulsamad Bakri

27 May 2023 29	Abha	0–3	Al-Hilal	Abha
21:00	Al-Jumayah (yellow card) 55'; Al-Amri (yellow card) 58'; Atouchi (yellow card) 72'	Report	Al-Qahtani 11'; Ighalo 44'; Al-Hamdan 87', (yellow card) 90+2'	Stadium: Prince Sultan bin Abdul Aziz Stadium; Attendance: 13,422; Referee: Mohammed Al-Esmaiel

31 May 2023 30	Al-Khaleej	3–1	Abha	Dammam
21:00	Souza 46'; Al-Khabrani (yellow card) 49' (yellow-red card) 52'; Morato 74', 84'; Martins (yellow card) 80'; Al-Shanqiti (yellow card) 90+3'	Report	Al-Selouli 25'; Matić (yellow card) 45'	Stadium: Prince Mohamed bin Fahd Stadium; Attendance: Sami Al-Jires; Referee: 8,771

=== King Cup ===
All times are local, AST (UTC+3).

21 December 2022 Round of 16	Abha	4–3 (a.e.t.)	Al-Taawoun	Abha
15:30	Sharahili (yellow card) 11'; Caicedo 16'; Al-Amri (yellow card) 51'; Bguir 90+5' (pen.); Adam 97', 105+2'; Al-Kunaydiri (yellow card) 106' (yellow-red card) 118'	Report	Naldo (yellow card) 18'; Kaku 30', 84' (pen.); Al-Ghamdi (yellow card) 68'; Al-Rashidi (yellow card) 90+1'; Abdullah (yellow card) 104'; Tawamba 107'	Stadium: Prince Sultan bin Abdul Aziz Stadium; Referee: Mohammed Al-Harbi

14 March 2023 Quarter-finals	Al-Nassr	3–1	Abha	Riyadh
17:30	Al-Najei 1'; Al-Khaibari 21'; Al-Sulayhem (yellow card) 28'; Ronaldo (yellow card) 45+3'; Maran 49'	Report	Saddiki (yellow card) 25'; Adam 69'; Al-Jumayah (yellow card) 72'	Stadium: Mrsool Park; Attendance: 17,327; Referee: Andris Treimanis (Latvia)

== Statistics ==
=== Appearances ===
Last updated on 31 May 2023.

No.	Pos	Nat	Player	Total		Pro League		King Cup	
No.	Pos	Nat	Player	Apps	Goals	Apps	Goals	Apps	Goals
Goalkeepers
1	GK	(Saudi Arabia) KSA	Abdullah Al-Shammeri	1	0	1	0	0	0
12	GK	(Saudi Arabia) KSA	Abdulrahman Al-Bouq	0	0	0	0	0	0
16	GK	(Cameroon) CMR	Devis Epassy	31	0	29	0	2	0
33	GK	(Saudi Arabia) KSA	Mansour Jawhar	0	0	0	0	0	0
Defenders
3	DF	(Saudi Arabia) KSA	Abdullah Al-Zori	23	2	21+1	2	1	0
4	DF	(Iraq) IRQ	Saad Natiq	26	1	19+5	1	2	0
13	DF	(Saudi Arabia) KSA	Mohammed Al-Kunaydiri	24	0	9+14	0	0+1	0
19	DF	(Morocco) MAR	Amine Atouchi	28	1	26	1	2	0
31	DF	(Saudi Arabia) KSA	Sari Amr	15	0	9+5	0	1	0
39	DF	(Saudi Arabia) KSA	Saeed Al Hamsal	18	0	14+3	0	0+1	0
77	DF	(Saudi Arabia) KSA	Ahmed Al-Habib	0	0	0	0	0	0
Midfielders
6	MF	(Saudi Arabia) KSA	Abdulrahman Al-Barakah	3	0	0+3	0	0	0
7	MF	(Saudi Arabia) KSA	Saleh Al-Amri	29	5	27	5	2	0
8	MF	(Serbia) SRB	Uroš Matić	29	0	25+2	0	2	0
10	MF	(Tunisia) TUN	Saad Bguir	30	9	25+3	8	2	1
14	MF	(Saudi Arabia) KSA	Fahad Al-Jumayah	26	0	20+4	0	2	0
15	MF	(Saudi Arabia) KSA	Mutair Al-Zahrani	3	0	0+2	0	0+1	0
17	MF	(Algeria) ALG	Tayeb Meziani	12	0	3+7	0	0+2	0
18	MF	(Saudi Arabia) KSA	Nawaf Al-Sadi	21	5	18+1	5	2	0
21	MF	(Saudi Arabia) KSA	Zakaria Sami	23	2	21+1	2	1	0
23	MF	(Saudi Arabia) KSA	Nasser Al-Omran	7	0	0+6	0	0+1	0
25	MF	(Saudi Arabia) KSA	Abdulrahman Al-Alwi	1	0	0+1	0	0	0
26	MF	(Saudi Arabia) KSA	Musab Habkor	0	0	0	0	0	0
27	MF	(Saudi Arabia) KSA	Hassan Al-Qayd	6	0	1+5	0	0	0
32	MF	(Saudi Arabia) KSA	Sulaiman Asiri	0	0	0	0	0	0
34	MF	(Netherlands) NED	Dries Saddiki	16	0	11+4	0	1	0
48	MF	(Saudi Arabia) KSA	Waleed Asiri	1	0	0+1	0	0	0
54	MF	(Saudi Arabia) KSA	Mohammed Al-Qahtani	0	0	0	0	0	0
86	MF	(Saudi Arabia) KSA	Aseel Al-Harbi	0	0	0	0	0	0
88	MF	(Saudi Arabia) KSA	Saad Al-Selouli	22	2	6+14	2	0+2	0
Forwards
9	FW	(Saudi Arabia) KSA	Abdulfattah Adam	28	7	16+10	4	0+2	3
20	FW	(Ecuador) ECU	Felipe Caicedo	24	3	15+8	2	1	1
Players sent out on loan this season
90	FW	(Saudi Arabia) KSA	Omar Al-Ruwaili	0	0	0	0	0	0
Player who made an appearance this season but have left the club
11	MF	(Mozambique) MOZ	Luís Miquissone	4	0	2+2	0	0	0
47	MF	(Republic of the Congo) CGO	Prestige Mboungou	1	0	1	0	0	0
89	MF	(Saudi Arabia) KSA	Riyadh Sharahili	13	0	11+1	0	1	0

=== Goalscorers ===
Rank	No.	Pos	Nat	Name	Pro League	King Cup	Total
1	10	MF	(Tunisia)	Saad Bguir	8	1	9
2	9	FW	(Saudi Arabia)	Abdulfattah Adam	4	3	7
3	7	MF	(Saudi Arabia)	Saleh Al-Amri	5	0	5
3	18	MF	(Saudi Arabia)	Nawaf Al-Sadi	5	0	5
5	20	FW	(Ecuador)	Felipe Caicedo	2	1	3
6	3	DF	(Saudi Arabia)	Abdullah Al-Zori	2	0	2
6	21	MF	(Saudi Arabia)	Zakaria Sami	2	0	2
6	88	MF	(Saudi Arabia)	Saad Al-Selouli	2	0	2
9	4	DF	(Iraq)	Saad Natiq	1	0	1
9	19	DF	(Morocco)	Amine Atouchi	1	0	1
Own goal					1	0	1
Total					33	5	38

Last Updated: 31 May 2023

=== Assists ===
Rank	No.	Pos	Nat	Name	Pro League	King Cup	Total
1	7	MF	(Saudi Arabia)	Saleh Al-Amri	6	1	7
1	10	MF	(Tunisia)	Saad Bguir	6	1	7
3	8	MF	(Serbia)	Uroš Matić	1	1	2
3	18	MF	(Saudi Arabia)	Nawaf Al-Sadi	2	0	2
3	19	DF	(Morocco)	Amine Atouchi	2	0	2
6	3	DF	(Saudi Arabia)	Abdullah Al-Zori	1	0	1
6	9	FW	(Saudi Arabia)	Abdulfattah Adam	1	0	1
6	13	DF	(Saudi Arabia)	Mohammed Al-Kunaydiri	1	0	1
Total					20	3	23

Last Updated: 31 May 2023

=== Clean sheets ===
Rank	No.	Pos	Nat	Name	Pro League	King Cup	Total
1	16	GK	(Cameroon)	Devis Epassy	3	0	3
Total					3	0	3

Last Updated: 2 May 2023
