= 2020–21 Abha Club season =

Abha
2020–21 season
- President: Ahmed Al-Hodithy
- Manager: Abderrazek Chebbi
- Stadium: Prince Sultan bin Abdul Aziz Stadium
- Pro League: 13th
- King Cup: Round of 16 (knocked out by Al-Batin)
- Top goalscorer: League: Carlos Strandberg (16); All: Carlos Strandberg (16)
- Highest home attendance: 1,117 (vs. Al-Ittihad, 20 May 2021)
- Lowest home attendance: 468 (vs. Al-Ahli, 25 May 2021)
- Average home league attendance: 793
Home colours	Away colours
- All statistics correct as of 30 May 2021.

The 2020–21 season was Abha's fourth non-consecutive season in the Pro League and their 55th season in existence. The club participated in the Pro League and the King Cup.

The season covered the period from 22 September 2020 to 30 June 2021.

== Players ==
=== Squad information ===
As of 1 February 2021

Note: Flags indicate national team as defined under FIFA eligibility rules; some limited exceptions apply. Players may hold more than one non-FIFA nationality.

No.	Pos.	Nation	Player
1	GK	KSA	Abdullah Al-Shammeri
4	DF	KSA	Muhannad Al-Qaydhi
5	MF	KSA	Abdulrahman Al-Barakah
6	DF	KSA	Karam Barnawi
7	MF	KSA	Saleh Al-Amri
9	FW	KSA	Omar Al-Ruwaili
10	MF	TUN	Saad Bguir
12	GK	MAR	Abdelali Mhamdi
13	DF	KSA	Ali Meadi (on loan from Al-Faisaly)
14	MF	KSA	Fahad Al-Jumayah (on loan from Al-Nassr)
15	MF	KSA	Ammar Al-Najjar
16	MF	KSA	Saud Zidan (on loan from Al-Nassr)
18	FW	KSA	Nawaf Al-Sadi
19	DF	MAR	Amine Atouchi

No.	Pos.	Nation	Player
20	MF	KSA	Thaar Al-Otaibi (on loan from Al-Hilal)
29	MF	TUN	Karim Aouadhi (captain)
31	DF	KSA	Sari Amr
32	MF	BIH	Benjamin Tatar
34	GK	KSA	Ali Al-Mazidi
39	DF	KSA	Saeed Al Hamsal
55	MF	KSA	Abdulaziz Al-Jamaan
70	FW	JOR	Muath Afaneh
77	DF	KSA	Ahmed Al-Habib
80	MF	KSA	Tariq Al-Shahrani
88	DF	KSA	Nader Al-Sharari
89	MF	KSA	Riyadh Sharahili
91	DF	ALG	Mehdi Tahrat
99	FW	SWE	Carlos Strandberg (on loan from Al-Hazem)

=== Out on loan ===
Note: Flags indicate national team as defined under FIFA eligibility rules; some limited exceptions apply. Players may hold more than one non-FIFA nationality.

No.	Pos.	Nation	Player
3	MF	KSA	Musab Habkor (at Najran until 30 June 2021)
33	GK	KSA	Mansor Joher (at Al-Fayha until 30 June 2021)

No.	Pos.	Nation	Player
90	MF	KSA	Jehad Al-Zowayed (at Al-Hazem until 30 June 2021)
—	MF	KSA	Abdullah Nasser (at Al-Nojoom until 30 June 2021)

== Transfers and loans ==
=== Transfers in ===
Entry date	Position	No.	Player	From club	Fee	Ref.
22 September 2020	GK	1	(Saudi Arabia) Abdullah Al-Shammeri	(Saudi Arabia) Al-Kawkab	Free	
22 September 2020	GK	34	(Saudi Arabia) Ali Al-Mazidi	(Saudi Arabia) Al-Adalah	Free	
22 September 2020	DF	24	(Saudi Arabia) Hazaa Asiri	(Saudi Arabia) Ohod	End of loan	
22 September 2020	DF	39	(Saudi Arabia) Saeed Al Hamsal	(Saudi Arabia) Najran	Undisclosed	
22 September 2020	MF	89	(Saudi Arabia) Riyadh Sharahili	(Saudi Arabia) Al-Adalah	Free	
22 September 2020	MF	–	(Saudi Arabia) Abdullah Nasser	(Saudi Arabia) Al-Nojoom	End of loan	
28 September 2020	MF	7	(Saudi Arabia) Saleh Al-Amri	(Saudi Arabia) Al-Ettifaq	Undisclosed	
1 October 2020	DF	4	(Saudi Arabia) Muhannad Al-Qaydhi	(Saudi Arabia) Al-Raed	Free	
3 October 2020	MF	5	(Saudi Arabia) Abdulrahman Al-Barakah	(Saudi Arabia) Al-Fayha	Free	
17 November 2020	FW	9	(Saudi Arabia) Omar Al-Ruwaili	(Saudi Arabia) Al-Orobah	Undisclosed	
7 February 2021	MF	32	(Bosnia and Herzegovina) Benjamin Tatar	(Bosnia and Herzegovina) Sarajevo	$300,000	

=== Loans in ===
Start date	End date	Position	No.	Player	From club	Fee	Ref.
28 September 2020	End of season	DF	13	(Saudi Arabia) Ali Meadi	(Saudi Arabia) Al-Faisaly	None	
10 October 2020	End of season	MF	16	(Saudi Arabia) Saud Zidan	(Saudi Arabia) Al-Nassr	None	
13 October 2020	End of season	MF	14	(Saudi Arabia) Fahad Al-Jumeiah	(Saudi Arabia) Al-Nassr	None	
13 October 2020	End of season	MF	20	(Saudi Arabia) Thaar Al-Otaibi	(Saudi Arabia) Al-Hilal	None	
14 October 2020	2 February 2021	MF	11	(Australia) Craig Goodwin	(Saudi Arabia) Al-Wehda	None	
18 October 2020	End of season	FW	99	(Sweden) Carlos Strandberg	(Saudi Arabia) Al-Hazem	None	
27 January 2021	End of season	MF	10	(Saudi Arabia) Abdullah Al-Qahtani	(Saudi Arabia) Al-Faisaly	None	

=== Transfers out ===
Exit date	Position	No.	Player	To club	Fee	Ref.
22 September 2020	GK	1	(Saudi Arabia) Mohammed Al-Hassawi	(Saudi Arabia) Al-Faisaly	Free	
22 September 2020	DF	4	(Saudi Arabia) Khaled Al-Khathlan	(Saudi Arabia) Al-Raed	Free	
22 September 2020	DF	32	(Saudi Arabia) Omar Al-Muziel	(Saudi Arabia) Al-Fayha	End of loan	
22 September 2020	MF	5	(Saudi Arabia) Ahmed Al-Najei	(Saudi Arabia) Al-Hazem	Free	
22 September 2020	MF	7	(Saudi Arabia) Abdullah Al-Qahtani	(Saudi Arabia) Al-Faisaly	End of loan	
22 September 2020	MF	25	(Algeria) Salim Boukhanchouche	(Saudi Arabia) ES Sahel	End of loan	
22 September 2020	MF	45	(Saudi Arabia) Hassan Al-Qeed	(Saudi Arabia) Al-Shabab	End of loan	
22 September 2020	FW	14	(Saudi Arabia) Saleh Al Abbas	(Saudi Arabia) Al-Nassr	End of loan	
22 September 2020	FW	22	(Tunisia) Firas Chaouat	(Tunisia) CS Sfaxien	End of loan	
30 September 2020	MF	17	(Saudi Arabia) Abdullah Qaisi	(Saudi Arabia) Damac	Free	
25 October 2020	DF	24	(Saudi Arabia) Hazaa Asiri	(Saudi Arabia) Najran	Free	
7 January 2021	DF	50	(Saudi Arabia) Osama Aashor	(Saudi Arabia) Ohod	Free	
2 February 2021	MF	55	(Saudi Arabia) Abdulaziz Al-Jamaan	(Saudi Arabia) Al-Adalah	Free	
7 February 2021	MF	15	(Saudi Arabia) Ammar Al-Najjar	(Saudi Arabia) Al-Shabab	$40,000	

=== Loans out ===
Start date	End date	Position	No.	Player	To club	Fee	Ref.
17 October 2020	End of season	MF	90	(Saudi Arabia) Jehad Al-Zowayed	(Saudi Arabia) Al-Hazem	None	
18 October 2020	End of season	GK	33	(Saudi Arabia) Mansor Joher	(Saudi Arabia) Al-Fayha	None	
19 October 2020	End of season	MF	–	(Saudi Arabia) Abdullah Nasser	(Saudi Arabia) Al-Nojoom	None	
25 October 2020	End of season	MF	3	(Saudi Arabia) Musab Habkor	(Saudi Arabia) Najran	None	

== Pre-season ==
1 October 2020 Friendly	Al-Wehda (Saudi Arabia)	3–0	(Saudi Arabia) Abha	Jeddah, Saudi Arabia
18:45 AST	Al-Eisa; Al-Ghamdi; Hawsawi	Report		Stadium: King Abdullah Sports City Reserve Stadium

8 October 2020 Friendly	Al-Raed (Saudi Arabia)	1–1	(Saudi Arabia) Abha	Jeddah, Saudi Arabia
19:00 AST	Al-Mogren	Report	Afaneh	Stadium: King Abdullah Sports City Reserve Stadium

== Competitions ==
=== Overview ===
Competition	Record							
Competition	G	W	D	L	GF	GA	GD	Win %
Pro League	30	10	6	14	42	50	−8	33.33
King Cup	1	0	0	1	0	3	−3	0.00
Total	31	10	6	15	42	53	−11	32.26

Updated to match played 30 May 2021
Source: Competitions

=== Pro League ===
==== League table ====
Pos	Team	Pld	W	D	L	GF	GA	GD	Pts	Qualification or relegation
11	Damac	30	9	9	12	43	48	−5	36 (Note: Positions determined by head-to-head points: Al-Faisaly: 16 pts; Al-Raed: 15 pts; Damac: 13 pts; Al-Batin: 12 pts; Abha: 3 pts.)	
12	Al-Batin	30	9	9	12	43	55	−12	36	
13	Abha	30	10	6	14	42	50	−8	36	
14	Al-Qadsiah (R)	30	8	11	11	41	47	−6	35	Relegation to MS League
15	Al-Wehda (R)	30	9	5	16	40	60	−20	32	Relegation to MS League

Source: spl.com source=إحصائيات رابطة دوري المحترفين السعودي 2020-2021
Rules for classification: 1) Points; 2) Head-to-head points; 3) Head-to-head goal difference; 4) Total goal difference; 5) Total goals scored; 6) Fair-play points (Note: Head-to-head record is used only after all the matches between the teams in question have been played).
(R) Relegated

==== Results summary ====
Overall								Home						Away					
Pld	W	D	L	GF	GA	GD	Pts	W	D	L	GF	GA	GD	W	D	L	GF	GA	GD
30	10	6	14	42	50	−8	36	5	4	6	20	23	−3	5	2	8	22	27	−5

Last updated: 30 May 2021.
Source: spl.com.sa

==== Results by round ====
Round	1	2	3	4	5	6	7	8	9	10	11	12	13	14	15	16	17	18	19	20	21	22	23	24	25	26	27	28	29	30
Ground	A	H	H	A	A	H	A	H	A	H	A	H	A	A	H	H	A	A	H	H	A	H	A	H	A	H	A	H	H	A
Result	L	D	W	L	L	W	W	D	L	L	W	W	W	L	D	L	W	L	L	L	D	W	L	L	W	W	L	L	D	D
Position	14	12	10	12	12	11	9	9	12	13	9	8	6	9	8	10	8	10	11	13	14	11	13	10	11	11	12	12	11	13

Updated to match(es) played on 30 May 2021. Source: spl.com.sa
A = Away; H = Home; W = Win; D = Draw; L = Loss

==== Matches ====
All times are local, AST (UTC+3).

Win Draw Loss Postponed

17 October 2020 1	Al-Shabab	1–0	Abha	Riyadh
18:00	Diop 29'; Al-Ammar (yellow card) 45+4'	Report	Al-Barakah (yellow card) 57'	Stadium: Prince Faisal bin Fahd Stadium; Attendance: 0 Referee: Mohammed Al-Hoaish

22 October 2020 2	Abha	1–1	Al-Hilal	Abha
15:40	Bguir 55' (pen.); Al-Jumeiah (yellow card) 71'	Report	Carrillo 36'; Al-Dawsari (yellow card) 74'	Stadium: Prince Sultan bin Abdul Aziz Stadium; Attendance: 0 Referee: Majed Al-Shamrani

31 October 2020 3	Abha	3–2	Al-Ettifaq	Abha
18:15	Aouadhi (yellow card) 19'; Strandberg 24'; Goodwin 39'; Tahrat (yellow card) 59'; Sharahili (yellow card) 62' (yellow-red card) 84'; Afaneh 72'	Report	Al-Qumaizi (red card) 11'; M'Bolhi (yellow card) 17'; Souza (yellow card) 65'; H. Al-Ghamdi 80'; Al Salem 90+2'	Stadium: Prince Sultan bin Abdul Aziz Stadium; Attendance: 0 Referee: Faisal Al-Blwi

6 November 2020 4	Al-Batin	3–0	Abha	Hafar al-Batin
17:45	Schenk (yellow card) 52'; El Jebli 81', 90+5'; Abreu 87'	Report	Al Hamsal (yellow card) 22'; Bguir (yellow card) 53'	Stadium: Al-Batin Club Stadium; Attendance: 0 Referee: Mohammed Al-Smail

23 November 2020 5	Al-Raed	2–1	Abha	Buraidah
15:15	Al-Zain 16'; Al-Farhan (yellow card) 41'; Djoum (yellow card) 61'; Fouzair 74'; Al-Rehaili (yellow card) 78'	Report	Strandberg 58'	Stadium: King Abdullah Sport City Stadium; Attendance: 0 Referee: Shukri Al-Hanfoush

3 December 2020 6	Abha	2–1	Al-Nassr	Abha
15:35	Al-Jumeiah (yellow card) 4'; Strandberg 55', 69'	Report	Yahya 19'; Amrabat (yellow card) 31'; S. Al-Ghanam (yellow card) 45+4'	Stadium: Prince Sultan bin Abdul Aziz Stadium; Attendance: 0 Referee: Majed Al-Shamrani

7 December 2020 7	Al-Fateh	1–3	Abha	Al-Hasa
17:30	Bendebka 45+3' (pen.); Al-Fuhaid (yellow card) 47'; Saâdane (yellow card) 78'	Report	Strandberg 8', 82'; Goodwin 18'; Aouadhi (yellow card) 41'; Amr (yellow card) 50'	Stadium: Prince Abdullah bin Jalawi Stadium; Attendance: 0 Referee: Mohammed Al-Qarni

12 December 2020 8	Abha	0–0	Al-Taawoun	Abha
15:35	Goodwin (yellow card) 38'; Aouadhi (yellow card) 43'	Report	Abousaban (yellow card) 69'	Stadium: Prince Sultan bin Abdul Aziz Stadium; Attendance: 0 Referee: Raed Al-Zahrani

22 December 2020 9	Damac	2–1	Abha	Abha
15:40	Vittor 37', (yellow card) 90+3'; Saidani (yellow card) 85'; Abo Shararah 90+4', (yellow card) 90+7'	Report	Aouadhi 9'; Atouchi (yellow card) 11'; Amr (yellow card) 34'	Stadium: Prince Sultan bin Abdul Aziz Stadium; Attendance: 0 Referee: Khaled Al-Teris

27 December 2020 10	Abha	0–1	Al-Wehda	Abha
15:40	Amr (yellow card) 32'; Mhamdi (yellow card) 45'	Report	Abdu Jaber 40'; Anselmo (yellow card) 85'; Al Hejji (yellow card) 90+3'	Stadium: Prince Sultan bin Abdul Aziz Stadium; Attendance: 0 Referee: Mohammed Al-Esmaiel

1 January 2021 11	Al-Ain	2–4	Abha	Al Bahah
15:50	Juanpi 22'; Aouadhi 68' (o.g.)	Report	Strandberg 31', 81', 89', (yellow card) 90+1'; Amr (yellow card) 40'; Sharahili 56'; Barnawi (yellow card) 85'; Mhamdi (yellow card) 88'	Stadium: King Saud Sport City Stadium; Attendance: 0 Referee: Ahmad Al-Rumaikhani

7 January 2021 12	Abha	1–0	Al-Faisaly	Abha
15:50	Aouadhi 85'	Report	Daghriri (yellow card) 40'; Rossi (yellow card) 51'	Stadium: Prince Sultan bin Abdul Aziz Stadium; Attendance: 0 Referee: Sultan Al-Harbi

14 January 2021 13	Al-Ittihad	0–1	Abha	Jeddah
20:10	Abdulhamid (red card) 15'; Al-Aboud (yellow card) 71'	Report	Al-Amri (yellow card) 23'; Barnawi (yellow card) 32'; Goodwin (yellow card) 86'; Strandberg 88'	Stadium: King Abdullah Sports City; Attendance: 0 Referee: Faisal Al-Blwi

19 January 2021 14	Al-Ahli	3–0	Abha	Jeddah
20:10	Al Somah 11', 14'; Al-Asmari (yellow card) 78'; Ghareeb 90+8'	Report	Tahrat (yellow card) 66'; Aouadhi (yellow card) 87'	Stadium: King Abdullah Sports City Reserve Stadium; Attendance: 0 Referee: Mohammed Al-Nuhait

24 January 2021 15	Abha	2–2	Al-Qadsiah	Abha
15:55	Al-Amri 20'; Tahrat (yellow card) 39'; Bguir 42'; Atouchi (yellow card) 66'	Report	Al-Amri 50' (pen.); Andria 59'	Stadium: Prince Sultan bin Abdul Aziz Stadium; Attendance: 0 Referee: Abdullah Al-Harbi

30 January 2021 16	Abha	2–3	Al-Shabab	Abha
16:00	Bguir 62'; Al-Amri 71'; Al-Jumeiah (yellow card) 86'	Report	Lichnovsky 55'; Guanca 57'; Sebá 69'; Al-Zori (yellow card) 84'	Stadium: Prince Sultan bin Abdul Aziz Stadium; Attendance: 0 Referee: Turki Al-Khudhayr

4 February 2021 17	Al-Hilal	2–3	Abha	Riyadh
18:15	Jahfali (yellow card) 10'; Al-Shehri 13'; Carrillo 67'	Report	Sharahili 11'; Tahrat 75'; Amr (yellow card) 86'; Bguir 90+7', (yellow card) 90+8'	Stadium: Prince Faisal bin Fahd Stadium; Attendance: 0 Referee: Ilgiz Tantashev (Uzbekistan)

11 February 2021 18	Al-Ettifaq	4–1	Abha	Dammam
18:05	Al-Kwikbi 4', 31', (yellow card) 24'; Souza 8'; Sliti 69'	Report	Barnawi (yellow card) 20'; Al-Sharari (yellow card) 67'; Al Hamsal (yellow card) 78'; Sharahili 87'; Zidan (yellow card) 90+2'	Stadium: Prince Mohamed bin Fahd Stadium; Attendance: 0 Referee: Faisal Al-Blwi

17 February 2021 19	Abha	1–2	Al-Batin	Abha
16:05	Strandberg 39'; Tatar (yellow card) 71'; Bguir (yellow card) 90+7'	Report	Abreu 26'; Al-Shamlan 50'; Campaña (yellow card) 89'; Al-Hurayji (yellow card) 90+6'	Stadium: Prince Sultan bin Abdul Aziz Stadium; Attendance: 0 Referee: Khalid Al-Johani

22 February 2021 20	Abha	0–3	Al-Raed	Abha
16:10	Al-Amri (yellow card) 19'; Amr (yellow card) 45'	Report	Fouzair 12'; El Berkaoui 20' (pen.), 26'; Mustafa (yellow card) 66'	Stadium: Prince Sultan bin Abdul Aziz Stadium; Attendance: 0 Referee: Sultan Al-Harbi

28 February 2021 21	Al-Nassr	2–2	Abha	Riyadh
20:30	Al-Najei 61', 90+3', (yellow card) 78'; Madu (yellow card) 83'	Report	Strandberg 11', 74'; Atouchi (yellow card) 77'	Stadium: Mrsool Park; Attendance: 0 Referee: Mohammed Al-Hoaish

5 March 2021 22	Abha	2–1	Al-Fateh	Abha
16:10	Bguir 33'; Tahrat (yellow card) 45+3'; Strandberg 78'; Al-Jumeiah (yellow card) 90+1'; Mhamdi (yellow card) 90+6'; Sharahili (yellow card) 90+7'	Report	Cueva (yellow card) 80' te Vrede 90'	Stadium: Prince Sultan bin Abdul Aziz Stadium; Attendance: 0 Referee: Sami Al-Jires

10 March 2021 23	Al-Taawoun	1–0	Abha	Buraidah
18:50	Santos (yellow card) 61'; Al-Nabit 72'; Cássio (yellow card) 90+4'	Report	Amr (yellow card) 45'; Zidan (yellow card) 52'; Strandberg (yellow card) 61'	Stadium: King Abdullah Sport City Stadium; Attendance: 0 Referee: Majed Al-Shamrani

15 March 2021 25	Al-Wehda	1–4	Abha	Mecca
19:10	Anselmo (yellow card) 40'; Niakaté 85' (pen.)	Report	Al-Barakah 23'; Bguir 35'; Atouchi (yellow card) 48'; Strandberg 66'; Sharahili 79'; Amr (yellow card) 83'	Stadium: King Abdul Aziz Stadium; Attendance: 0 Referee: Khaled Al-Teris

21 March 2021 24	Abha	3–4	Damac	Abha
16:05	Aouadhi 34', (yellow card) 81'; Meadi (yellow card) 62' (yellow-red card) 90+1'; Bguir 75', 85' (pen.), (yellow card) 90+1'	Report	Chafaï 10', 42', 90+2'; Al Haydar (yellow card) 45+3'; Al-Ammar 78'; Zeghba (yellow card) 84'; Al-Najej (yellow card) 90+3'	Stadium: Prince Sultan bin Abdul Aziz Stadium; Attendance: 0 Referee: Mohammed Al-Hoaish

15 April 2021 26	Abha	1–0	Al-Ain	Abha
21:50	Strandberg 17'; Amr (yellow card) 85'; Al-Habib (yellow card) 89'	Report	Al-Sohaymi (yellow card) 52'; Sufyani (yellow card) 90+1'	Stadium: Prince Sultan bin Abdul Aziz Stadium; Attendance: 0 Referee: Ahmad Al-Rumaikhani

14 May 2021 27	Al-Faisaly	2–1	Abha	Al Majma'ah
19:15	Al-Saiari 79', 86', (yellow card) 86'	Report	Al-Jumeiah (yellow card) 19'; Al-Sharari (yellow card) 40'; Tatar 63', (yellow card) 63'; Al-Barakah (yellow card) 84'; Atouchi (yellow card) 87'	Stadium: Al Majma'ah Sports City; Attendance: 0 Referee: Raed Al-Zahrani

20 May 2021 28	Abha	1–2	Al-Ittihad	Abha
19:15	Al-Amri 35' (pen.); Tatar (yellow card) 83'	Report	Prijović 7', (yellow card) 72'; Al-Malki 42'; El Ahmadi (yellow card) 80'	Stadium: Prince Sultan bin Abdul Aziz Stadium; Attendance: 1,117; Referee: Khaled Salwi

25 May 2021 29	Abha	1–1	Al-Ahli	Abha
21:00	Zidan (yellow card) 41'; Afaneh 83'	Report	Al-Asmari (yellow card) 32'; Al-Mogahwi 39'; Al-Mousa (yellow card) 80'	Stadium: Prince Sultan bin Abdul Aziz Stadium; Attendance: 468; Referee: Majed Al-Shamrani

30 May 2021 30	Al-Qadsiah	1–1	Abha	Khobar
21:00	Asprilla 45+1' (pen.); Al-Safri (yellow card) 60'; Vitas (yellow card) 90+3'	Report	Al-Sharari (yellow card) 5'; Al Hamsal (yellow card) 56'; Atouchi (yellow card) 60'; Al-Amri (yellow card) 82', (goal) 85'; Mhamdi (yellow card) 90'; Al-Ruwaili (yellow card) 90+3'	Stadium: Prince Saud bin Jalawi Stadium; Attendance: 1,273; Referee: Mohammed Al-Hoaish

=== King Cup ===
All times are local, AST (UTC+3).

17 December 2020 Round of 16	Al-Batin	3–0	Abha	Hafar al-Batin
15:15	Chaves 9'; Sami 25'; Al-Qarni (yellow card) 47'; El Jebli (yellow card) 48'; Abreu 82'	Report	Al-Jamaan (yellow card) 8'; Al-Jumeiah (yellow card) 22'	Stadium: Al-Batin Club Stadium; Attendance: 0 Referee: Mohammed Al-Nuhait

== Statistics ==
=== Appearances ===
Last updated on 30 May 2021.

No.	Pos	Nat	Player	Total		Pro League		King Cup	
No.	Pos	Nat	Player	Apps	Goals	Apps	Goals	Apps	Goals
Goalkeepers
1	GK	(Saudi Arabia) KSA	Abdullah Al-Shammeri	0	0	0	0	0	0
12	GK	(Morocco) MAR	Abdelali Mhamdi	31	0	30	0	1	0
34	GK	(Saudi Arabia) KSA	Ali Al-Mazidi	0	0	0	0	0	0
Defenders
4	DF	(Saudi Arabia) KSA	Muhannad Al-Qaydhi	0	0	0	0	0	0
6	DF	(Saudi Arabia) KSA	Karam Barnawi	19	0	14+4	0	1	0
13	DF	(Saudi Arabia) KSA	Ali Meadi	4	0	4	0	0	0
19	DF	(Morocco) MAR	Amine Atouchi	24	0	24	0	0	0
31	DF	(Saudi Arabia) KSA	Sari Amr	25	0	24	0	1	0
39	DF	(Saudi Arabia) KSA	Saeed Al Hamsal	11	0	6+4	0	0+1	0
77	DF	(Saudi Arabia) KSA	Ahmed Al-Habib	5	0	4+1	0	0	0
88	DF	(Saudi Arabia) KSA	Nader Al-Sharari	21	0	14+6	0	1	0
91	DF	(Algeria) ALG	Mehdi Tahrat	26	1	25	1	1	0
Midfielders
5	MF	(Saudi Arabia) KSA	Abdulrahman Al-Barakah	23	1	16+7	1	0	0
7	MF	(Saudi Arabia) KSA	Saleh Al-Amri	31	4	30	4	0+1	0
8	MF	(Saudi Arabia) KSA	Abdullah Al-Qahtani	10	0	2+8	0	0	0
10	MF	(Tunisia) TUN	Saad Bguir	24	8	21+2	8	0+1	0
14	MF	(Saudi Arabia) KSA	Fahad Al-Jumeiah	23	0	10+12	0	1	0
16	MF	(Saudi Arabia) KSA	Saud Zidan	11	0	6+5	0	0	0
20	MF	(Saudi Arabia) KSA	Thaar Al-Otaibi	5	0	0+5	0	0	0
29	MF	(Tunisia) TUN	Karim Aouadhi	24	3	22+1	3	1	0
32	MF	(Bosnia and Herzegovina) BIH	Benjamin Tatar	10	1	6+4	1	0	0
80	MF	(Saudi Arabia) KSA	Tariq Al-Shahrani	0	0	0	0	0	0
89	MF	(Saudi Arabia) KSA	Riyadh Sharahili	26	4	25	4	1	0
Forwards
9	FW	(Saudi Arabia) KSA	Omar Al-Ruwaili	5	0	0+5	0	0	0
18	FW	(Saudi Arabia) KSA	Nawaf Al-Sadi	0	0	0	0	0	0
70	FW	(Jordan) JOR	Muath Afaneh	8	2	3+5	2	0	0
99	FW	(Sweden) SWE	Carlos Strandberg	29	16	28	16	1	0
Player who made an appearance this season but have left the club
11	MF	(Australia) AUS	Craig Goodwin	17	2	16	2	0+1	0
15	MF	(Saudi Arabia) KSA	Ammar Al-Najjar	9	0	0+8	0	1	0
55	MF	(Saudi Arabia) KSA	Abdulaziz Al-Jamaan	1	0	0	0	1	0

=== Goalscorers ===
Rank	No.	Pos	Nat	Name	Pro League	King Cup	Total
1	99	FW	(Sweden)	Carlos Strandberg	16	0	16
2	10	MF	(Tunisia)	Saad Bguir	8	0	8
3	7	MF	(Saudi Arabia)	Saleh Al-Amri	4	0	4
3	89	MF	(Saudi Arabia)	Riyadh Sharahili	4	0	4
5	29	MF	(Tunisia)	Karim Aouadhi	3	0	3
6	11	MF	(Australia)	Craig Goodwin	2	0	2
6	70	FW	(Jordan)	Muath Afaneh	2	0	2
8	5	MF	(Saudi Arabia)	Abdulrahman Al-Barakah	1	0	1
8	32	MF	(Bosnia and Herzegovina)	Benjamin Tatar	1	0	1
8	91	DF	(Algeria)	Mehdi Tahrat	1	0	1
Own goal					0	0	0
Total					42	0	42

Last Updated: 30 May 2021

=== Assists ===
Rank	No.	Pos	Nat	Name	Pro League	King Cup	Total
1	7	MF	(Saudi Arabia)	Saleh Al-Amri	8	0	8
1	10	MF	(Tunisia)	Saad Bguir	8	0	8
3	31	DF	(Saudi Arabia)	Sari Amr	3	0	3
3	89	MF	(Saudi Arabia)	Riyadh Sharahili	3	0	3
5	99	FW	(Sweden)	Carlos Strandberg	2	0	2
6	6	DF	(Saudi Arabia)	Karam Barnawi	1	0	1
6	8	MF	(Saudi Arabia)	Abdullah Al-Qahtani	1	0	1
6	11	MF	(Australia)	Craig Goodwin	1	0	1
6	12	GK	(Morocco)	Abdelali Mhamdi	1	0	1
6	32	MF	(Bosnia and Herzegovina)	Benjamin Tatar	1	0	1
Total					29	0	29

Last Updated: 30 May 2021

=== Clean sheets ===
Rank	No.	Pos	Nat	Name	Pro League	King Cup	Total
1	12	GK	(Morocco)	Abdelali Mhamdi	4	0	4
Total					4	0	4

Last Updated: 15 April 2021
