= Mohammed Al-Kunaydiri =

Saudi Arabian footballer (born 2000)

Personal information
- Full name: Mohammed Raji Al-Kunaydiri
- Date of birth: 11 October 2000 (age 26)
- Place of birth: Saudi Arabia
- Height: 1.75 m (5 ft 9 in)
- Position: Left back

Team information
- Current team: Al-Najma
- Number: 12

Youth career
- –2020: Al-Hilal

Senior career*
Years	Team	Apps	(Gls)
2020–2021	Al-Hilal	0	(0)
2020–2021	→ Al-Adalah (loan)	19	(0)
2021–2024	Abha	66	(0)
2024–2025	Al-Fateh	14	(0)
2025	Al-Tai	15	(2)
2025–	Al-Najma	0	(0)

International career
2021–2022	Saudi Arabia U23		
- * Club domestic league appearances and goals as of 27 June 2022

Mohammed Al-Kunaydiri (Arabic: محمد الكنيدري; born 11 October 2000), is a Saudi Arabian professional footballer who plays as a left back for Al-Najma.

== Career ==
Al-Kunaydiri began his career at the youth team of Al-Hilal. On 20 September 2020, Al-Kunaydiri made his debut for Al-Hilal by starting in the AFC Champions League group stage match against Iranian side Shahr Khodro. On 26 October 2020, Al-Kunaydiri signed his first professional contract with the club. On the same day, Al-Kunaydiri joined MS League side Al-Adalah on a one-year loan. On 4 July 2021, Al-Kunaydiri joined Pro League side Abha on a three-year contract. On 1 September 2024, Al-Kunaydiri joined Pro League side Al-Fateh. On 31 January 2025, Al-Kunaydiri joined Al-Tai. On 4 August 2025, Al-Kunaydiri joined Al-Najma.

== Career statistics ==
=== Club ===
As of 27 May 2024.

Club	Season	League			Cup		Continental		Other		Total	
Club	Season	Division	Apps	Goals	Apps	Goals	Apps	Goals	Apps	Goals	Apps	Goals
Al-Hilal	2019–20	Pro League	0	0	0	0	1	0	0	0	1	0
Al-Adalah	2020–21	MS League	19	0	—		—		—		19	0
Abha	2021–22	Pro League	20	0	0	0	—		—		20	0
Abha	2022–23	Pro League	23	0	1	0	—		—		24	0
Abha	2023–24	Pro League	23	0	2	0	—		—		25	0
Abha	Total		66	0	3	0	0	0	0	0	69	0
Al-Fateh	2024–25	Pro League	14	0	1	0	—		—		15	0
Career total			99	0	4	0	1	0	0	0	106	0
