= Riyadh Sharahili =

Saudi Arabian footballer

Personal information
- Full name: Riyadh Mohammed Mohammed Husami Sharahili
- Date of birth: 28 April 1993 (age 33)
- Place of birth: Riyadh, Saudi Arabia
- Height: 1.84 m (6 ft 0 in)
- Position: Midfielder

Team information
- Current team: Al-Ettifaq (on loan from Neom)
- Number: 26

Youth career
- Al-Nassr

Senior career*
Years	Team	Apps	(Gls)
2015–2018	Al-Fateh	40	(0)
2018–2019	Al-Tai	18	(1)
2019	Al-Faisaly	0	(0)
2019–2020	Al-Adalah	16	(1)
2020–2023	Abha	61	(6)
2023–2024	Al-Shabab	21	(0)
2024–	Neom	14	(0)
2025–2026	→ Damac (loan)	22	(0)
2026–	→ Al-Ettifaq (loan)	0	(0)

International career^{‡}
2022–	Saudi Arabia	9	(0)
- * Club domestic league appearances and goals as of 5 November 2026 ‡ National team caps and goals as of 12 January 2023

Riyadh Mohammed Mohammed Husami Sharahili (Arabic: رِيَاض مُحَمَّد مُحَمَّد حُسَامِيّ شَرَاحِيلِيّ; born 28 April 1993) is a Saudi professional footballer who plays for Al-Ettifaq, on loan from Neom as a midfielder. He also played for the Saudi Arabia national team.

== Career ==
Sharahili began his career at the youth teams of Al-Nassr. On 5 July 2015, Sharahili joined Al-Fateh on a three-year contract following his release from Al-Nassr.

On 10 July 2018, Sharahili joined First Division side Al-Tai. On 3 March 2019, he joined Al-Faisaly. On 12 July 2019, Sharahili joined newly promoted Pro League side Al-Adalah. On 9 September 2020, he joined Abha on a two-year contract.

On 16 July 2021, Sharahili renewed his contract with Abha until 2024. On 28 January 2023, he joined Al-Shabab on a four-year contract. On 18 July 2024, Sharahili joined First Division side Neom. On 2 September 2025, Sharahili joined Damac on loan.

== Career statistics ==
=== Club ===
As of match played 27 May 2024

Club	Season	League			King Cup		Asia		Other		Total	
Club	Season	Division	Apps	Goals	Apps	Goals	Apps	Goals	Apps	Goals	Apps	Goals
Al-Fateh	2015–16	Pro League	5	0	0	0	—		1 (Note: Appearances in Crown Prince Cup)	0	6	0
Al-Fateh	2016–17	Pro League	17	0	2	0	5	0	2	0	26	0
Al-Fateh	2017–18	Pro League	18	0	2	1	—		0	0	20	1
Al-Fateh	Total		40	0	4	1	5	0	3	0	52	1
Al-Tai	2018–19	MS League	18	1	0	0	—		—		18	1
Al-Faisaly	2018–19	Pro League	0	0	0	0	—		—		0	0
Al-Adalah	2019–20	Pro League	16	1	4	0	—		—		20	1
Abha	2020–21	Pro League	25	4	1	0	—		—		26	4
Abha	2021–22	Pro League	24	2	1	0	—		—		25	2
Abha	2022–23	Pro League	12	0	1	0	—		—		13	0
Abha	Total		61	6	3	0	0	0	0	0	64	6
Al-Shabab	2022–23	Pro League	12	0	0	0	2	0	3 (Note: Appearances in Arab Club Champions Cup)	0	17	0
Al-Shabab	2023–24	Pro League	9	0	2	0	—		4	0	15	0
Al-Shabab	Total		21	0	2	0	2	0	7	0	32	0
Career total			156	8	13	1	7	0	10	0	186	9
