= Devis Epassy =

Cameroonian footballer (born 1993)

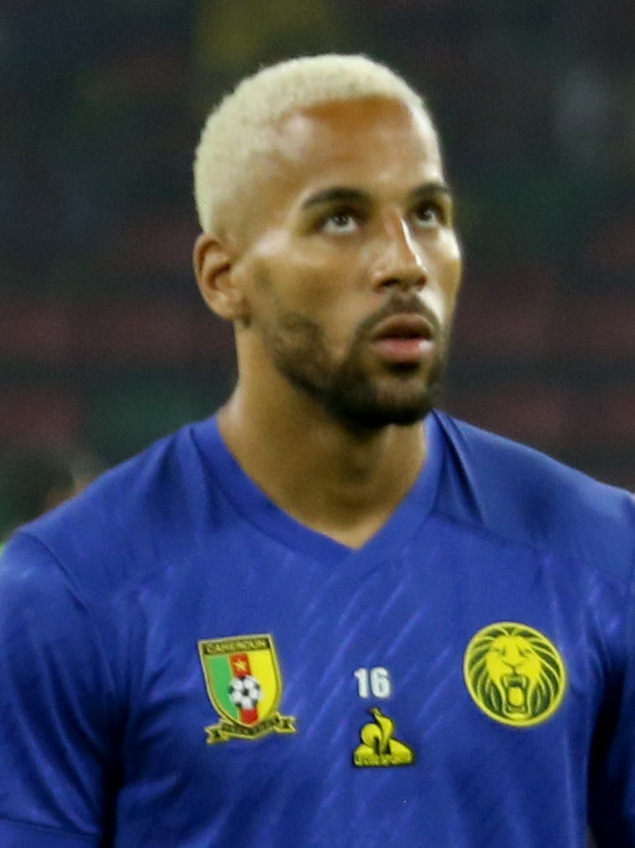
- Epassy with Cameroon at the 2021 Africa Cup of Nations

Personal information
- Full name: Devis Rogers Epassy Mboka
- Date of birth: 2 February 1993 (age 33)
- Place of birth: Soisy-sous-Montmorency, France
- Height: 1.87 m (6 ft 2 in)
- Position: Goalkeeper

Team information
- Current team: Dinamo București
- Number: 1

Youth career
- 1998–2003: Red Star
- 2003–2008: Paris FC
- 2006–2008: INF Clairefontaine
- 2008–2012: Rennes

Senior career*
Years	Team	Apps	(Gls)
2012–2013	Rennes B	11	(0)
2013–2014	Lorient B	10	(0)
2013–2014	Lorient	0	(0)
2014–2015	Guijuelo	12	(0)
2015–2016	Avranches	0	(0)
2016–2017	Épinal	13	(0)
2017–2020	Levadiakos	36	(0)
2020–2021	Lamia	32	(0)
2021–2022	OFI	23	(0)
2022–2024	Abha	30	(0)
2024–2025	Karmiotissa	32	(0)
2025–	Dinamo București	29	(0)

International career^{‡}
2021–	Cameroon	16	(0)
Medal record
Men's football
Representing Cameroon
Africa Cup of Nations
Third place	2021 Cameroon
- * Club domestic league appearances and goals as of 16 May 2026 ‡ National team caps and goals as of 27 March 2026

Devis Rogers Epassy Mboka (born 2 February 1993) is a professional footballer who plays as a goalkeeper for Liga I club Dinamo București and the Cameroon national team.

== Early life ==
Epassy was born and raised in France.

== Club career ==
=== Levadiakos ===
Epassy joined Levadiakos on 14 August 2017 from Épinal.

=== Lamia ===
On 29 January 2020, Epassy joined Lamia from Levadiakos on a three-year deal.

=== OFI ===
On 15 July 2021, Epassy agreed to join Greek Super League club OFI on a two-year deal. On 18 July 2021, OFI officially announced Epassy after signing a two-year contract with the club, as previously agreed.

=== Abha ===
On 6 August 2022, Epassy joined Saudi Arabian club Abha on a free transfer.

== International career ==
Born in France, Epassy is Cameroonian by descent. He was called up to represent the Cameroon national team in June 2021. He debuted with Cameroon in a 0–0 friendly tie with Nigeria on 8 June 2021. He made his first appearance of the 2022 FIFA World Cup in 3–3 tie to Serbia in the Group stage of the tournament after original starting goalkeeper André Onana was sent home by manager Rigobert Song following a disagreement between the two of them. Epassy then kept a clean sheet by producing a total of 7 saves in Cameroon's final game, a 1–0 win against perennial favorites, Brazil.

== Career statistics ==
=== Club ===
As of 29 May 2026

Appearances and goals by club, season and competition
Club	Season	League			National cup (Note: Includes Coupe de France, Greek Cup, King's Cup)		Continental		Other		Total	
Club	Season	Division	Apps	Goals	Apps	Goals	Apps	Goals	Apps	Goals	Apps	Goals
Rennes B	2012–13	CFA 2	11	0	—		—		—		11	0
Lorient B	2013–14	CFA 2	10	0	—		—		—		12	0
Lorient	2013–14	Ligue 1	0	0	—		—		—		0	0
Gijuelo	2014–15	Segunda División B	12	0	0	0	—		—		12	0
Avranches	2015–16	Championnat National	0	0	0	0	—		—		0	0
Épinal	2016–17	Championnat National	13	0	3	0	—		—		16	0
Levadiakos	2017–18	Super League Greece	26	0	1	0	—		—		27	0
Levadiakos	2018–19	Super League Greece	9	0	0	0	—		—		9	0
Levadiakos	2019–20	Super League Greece 2	1	0	0	0	—		—		1	0
Levadiakos	Total		36	0	1	0	—		—		37	0
Lamia	2019–20	Super League Greece	5	0	0	0	—		—		5	0
Lamia	2020–21	Super League Greece	27	0	0	0	—		—		27	0
Lamia	Total		32	0	0	0	—		—		32	0
OFI	2021–22	Super League Greece	23	0	0	0	—		—		13	0
Abha	2022–23	Saudi Pro League	29	0	2	0	—		—		31	0
Abha	2023–24	Saudi Pro League	1	0	0	0	—		—		1	0
Abha	Total		30	0	2	0	—		—		32	0
Karmiotissa	2024–25	Cypriot First Division	32	0	0	0	—		—		32	0
Dinamo București	2025–26	Liga I	29	0	1	0	—		1 (Note: Appearances in Liga I European play-offs)	0	31	0
Dinamo București	2026–27	Liga I	0	0	0	0	—		—		0	0
Dinamo București	Total		29	0	1	0	—		1	0	31	0
Career total			228	0	7	0	0	0	1	0	236	0

=== International ===
As of match played 27 March 2026

Appearances and goals by national team and year
National team	Year	Apps	Goals
Cameroon	2021	5	0
Cameroon	2022	2	0
Cameroon	2023	2	0
Cameroon	2024	0	0
Cameroon	2025	4	0
Cameroon	2026	3	0
Total		16	0

== Honours ==
Cameroon

- Africa Cup of Nations third place: 2022.
