= Omar Al-Ruwaili =

Saudi Arabian association footballer

Omar Al-Ruwaili عمر الرويلي
Personal information
- Full name: Omar Damen Al-Ruwaili
- Date of birth: 17 March 1999 (age 27)
- Place of birth: Saudi Arabia
- Height: 1.82 m (5 ft 11 1/2 in)
- Position: Striker

Team information
- Current team: Najran
- Number: 94

Youth career
- Al-Orobah

Senior career*
Years	Team	Apps	(Gls)
2019–2021	Al-Orobah	36	(12)
2021–2024	Abha	19	(1)
2023	→ Al-Riyadh (loan)	13	(1)
2024	Al-Hazem	3	(0)
2024–2025	Al-Najma	26	(1)
2026–	Najran	0	(0)

International career
2016–2017	Saudi Arabia U17		
2019	Saudi Arabia U20		
- * Club domestic league appearances and goals as of 19 August 2023

Omar Al-Ruwaili (Arabic: عمر الرويلي, born 17 March 1999) is a Saudi Arabian professional footballer who plays for Najran as a striker.

== Career ==
Al-Ruwailli began his career in the youth setups of Al-Orobah. He made his debut during the second half of the 2018–19 season. In his first full season at the club, Al-Ruwaili scored 7 goals in 15 appearances in the Saudi Second Division. He scored his first goal on 25 January 2020 in the 2–1 defeat to Al-Safa. On 14 February 2020, he scored his first hattrick in the 6–3 win against Al-Kholood. On 17 November 2020, Al-Ruwaili signed a three-year contract with Pro League side Abha. He made his debut on 19 January 2021 in the 3–0 defeat to Al-Ahli. On 16 January 2023, Al-Ruwaili joined Al-Riyadh on a six-month loan. On 10 February 2024, Al-Ruwaili joined Pro League side Al-Hazem on a permanent transfer. On 11 September 2024, Al-Ruwaili joined Al-Najma.

== Career statistics ==
=== Club ===
As of match played 27 May 2024

Appearances and goals by club, season and competition
Club	Season	League			King Cup		Asia		Other		Total	
Club	Season	Division	Apps	Goals	Apps	Goals	Apps	Goals	Apps	Goals	Apps	Goals
Al-Orobah	2018–19	MS League	11	0	2	0	—		—		13	0
Al-Orobah	2019–20	Second Division	15	8	0	0	—		—		15	8
Al-Orobah	2020–21	Second Division	10	4	—		—		—		10	4
Al-Orobah	Total		36	12	2	0	0	0	0	0	38	12
Abha	2020–21	Pro League	5	0	0	0	—		—		5	0
Abha	2021–22	Pro League	8	0	1	0	—		—		9	0
Abha	2022–23	Pro League	0	0	0	0	—		—		0	0
Abha	2023–24	Pro League	6	1	0	0	—		—		6	1
Abha	Total		19	1	1	0	0	0	0	0	20	1
Al-Riyadh (loan)	2022–23	First Division	13	1	—		—		—		13	1
Al-Hazem	2023–24	Pro League	3	0	0	0	—		—		3	0
Career total			71	14	3	0	0	0	0	0	74	14
