= Uroš Matić =

Serbian footballer

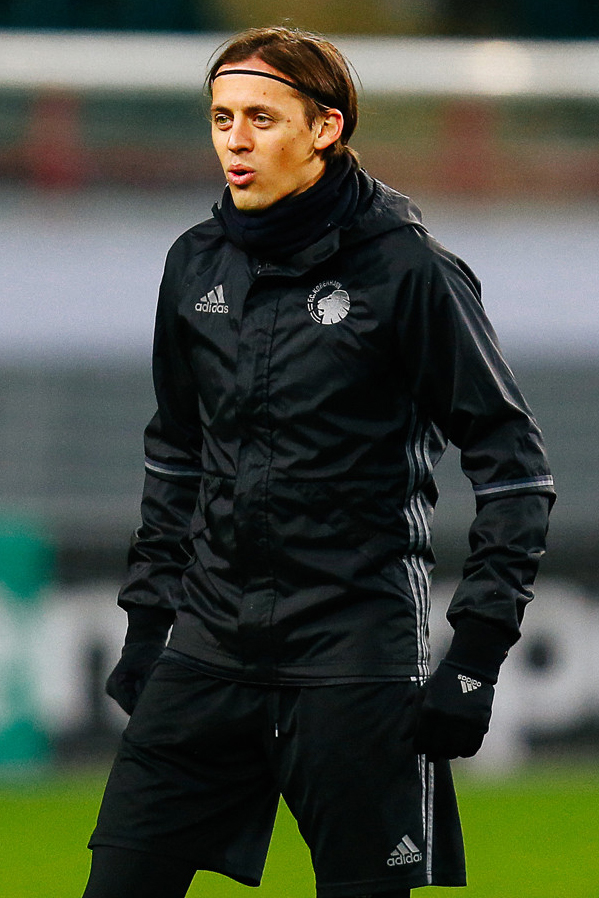

Personal information
- Full name: Uroš Matić
- Date of birth: 23 May 1990 (age 36)
- Place of birth: Šabac, SR Serbia, Yugoslavia
- Height: 1.84 m (6 ft 1/2 in)
- Position: Midfielder

Team information
- Current team: Jedinstvo Ub (manager)

Youth career
- Obrenovac 1905
- Jedinstvo Ub
- 2008–2009: Košice

Senior career*
Years	Team	Apps	(Gls)
2008–2013	Košice	72	(8)
2013–2014	Benfica B	16	(0)
2014–2016	NAC Breda	73	(4)
2016–2017	Sturm Graz	20	(3)
2017–2020	Copenhagen	24	(4)
2018–2019	→ Austria Wien (loan)	31	(5)
2019–2020	→ APOEL (loan)	19	(1)
2020–2021	Qarabağ	19	(1)
2021–2024	Abha	84	(3)
2024	Jedinstvo Ub	13	(0)

International career
2009	Serbia U19	7	(0)

Managerial career
- 2025–: Jedinstvo Ub
- * Club domestic league appearances and goals as of 27 December 2024

Uroš Matić (Serbian Cyrillic: Урош Матић, pronounced [ǔroʃ mǎːtitɕ]; born 23 May 1990) is a Serbian professional football manager and former player. He is the current manager of Jedinstvo Ub.

== Club career ==
Matić was born in Šabac in the Serbian Federal Republic. Moving from youth football to MFK Košice in 2008, he made his debut on 30 May 2009 as a substitute in second half of the match against Tatran Prešov. On 9 March 2013, in a 2–1 loss to Spartak Myjava, he scored a goal similar to one scored by Arjen Robben, but during extra time, he missed a penalty, firing the ball into the arms of Myjava goalkeeper Peter Solnička.

In early 2013, Matić joined his brother at Benfica in Portugal. on a 1-year contract with the option to extend it for a further five years. In 2014, at the same time as his brother left for Chelsea, he went on a trial at NAC Breda, who later, signed him on a permanent deal.

On 26 July 2020, Matić signed a three-year contract with Qarabağ. Matić left Qarabağ on 26 July 2021.

On 26 July 2021, Matić signed a two-year contract with Saudi club Abha.

== International career ==
Matić made four appearances for the Serbia national under-19 football team at the 2009 UEFA European Under-19 Championship.

== Personal life ==
Matić's older brother, Nemanja, is a former Serbia international. Matić's maternal grandfather was born in Volkovija, now North Macedonia, then settled with his family in Serbia; he has talked about joining the Macedonian national team (as he is eligible through his descent).

== Career statistics ==
As of 22 July 2024

Club	Season	League			Cup		Continental		Other		Total	
Club	Season	Division	Apps	Goals	Apps	Goals	Apps	Goals	Apps	Goals	Apps	Goals
Košice	2008-09	1. liga	1	0	—		—		—		1	0
Košice	2009-10	1. liga	3	0	1	0	2 (Note: Appearance(s) in UEFA Europa League)	0	—		6	0
Košice	2010-11	1. liga	23	3	—		—		—		23	3
Košice	2011-12	1. liga	13	0	—		—		—		13	0
Košice	2012-13	1. liga	32	5	4	0	—		—		36	5
Košice	Total		72	8	5	0	2	0	—		79	8
Benfica B	2013-14	Liga Portugal 2	16	0	—		—		—		16	0
NAC Breda	2013-14	Eredivisie	14	0	—		—		—		14	0
NAC Breda	2014-15	Eredivisie	28	1	3	1	—		4 (Note: Appearance(s) in Promotion/relegation play-offs)	0	35	2
NAC Breda	2015-16	Eerste Divisie	31	3	1	0	—		4	1	36	4
NAC Breda	Total		73	4	4	1	—		8	1	85	6
Sturm Graz	2016-17	Austrian Bundesliga	20	3	2	0	—		—		22	3
Copenhagen	2016–17	Danish Superliga	15	2	2	0	4	0	—		21	2
Copenhagen	2017–18	Danish Superliga	9	2	—		8 (Note: Three appearances in UEFA Champions League, Five appearances in UEFA Europa League)	0	—		17	2
Copenhagen	Total		24	4	2	0	12	0	—		38	4
Austria Wien (loan)	2018-19	Austrian Bundesliga	31	5	4	1	—		—		35	6
APOEL (loan)	2019-20	Cypriot First Division	19	1	1	0	14 (Note: Six appearances in UEFA Champions League, Eight appearances in UEFA Europa League)	2 (Note: One goal in UEFA Champions League, One goal in UEFA Europa League)	1 (Note: Appearance(s) in Cypriot Super Cup)	0	35	3
Qarabağ	2020–21	Azerbaijan Premier League	19	1	3	0	9 (Note: Three appearances in UEFA Champions League, Six appearances in UEFA Europa League)	2	—		31	3
Qarabağ	2021–22	Azerbaijan Premier League	—		—		0	0	—		0	0
Qarabağ	Total		19	1	3	0	9	2	—		31	3
Abha	2021–22	Saudi Pro League	28	3	1	0	—		—		29	3
Abha	2022–23	Saudi Pro League	27	0	2	0	—		—		29	0
Abha	2023–24	Saudi Pro League	29	0	3	0	—		—		32	0
Abha	Total		84	3	6	0	—		—		90	3
Career total			358	29	27	2	37	4	9	1	431	36

== Managerial statistics ==
As of 8 August 2026

Managerial record by team and tenure
Team	From	To	Record				
Team	From	To	P	W	D	L	Win %
Jedinstvo Ub	2 January 2025 »	Present	41	16	8	17	39.02
Total			41	16	8	17	39.02

== Honours ==
Copenhagen

- Danish Superliga: 2016–17
- Danish Cup: 2016–17
