= Dani Suárez =

Spanish footballer (born 1990)

Personal information
- Full name: Daniel Suárez García-Osorio
- Date of birth: 7 May 1990 (age 36)
- Place of birth: Aranjuez, Spain
- Height: 1.89 m (6 ft 2 1/2 in)
- Position: Centre-back

Youth career
- Real Aranjuez
- Real Madrid C

Senior career*
Years	Team	Apps	(Gls)
2011–2014	Real Madrid C	68	(7)
2014–2015	Real Madrid Castilla	11	(0)
2015–2016	Ponferradina	0	(0)
2017–2019	Górnik Zabrze	81	(10)
2019–2021	Asteras Tripolis	51	(5)
2021–2022	Abha	12	(0)
2022–2023	Atromitos	9	(0)
- * Club domestic league appearances and goals as of 30 October 2022

Dani Suárez (born 7 May 1990) is a Spanish professional footballer who plays as a centre-back.

== Career ==
On 21 June 2019, he joined Asteras Tripolis of the Greek Super League 1 on a free transfer.

On 14 August 2021, he joined Abha on a one-year deal.

On 15 July 2022, Dani signed a one-year contract with Atromitos with an option for an additional one.

== Career statistics ==
As of 5 July 2024

Club	Season	League			Cup		Continental		Other		Total	
Club	Season	Division	Apps	Goals	Apps	Goals	Apps	Goals	Apps	Goals	Apps	Goals
Real Madrid Castilla	2014–15	Segunda División B	11	0	0	0	—		—		11	0
Ponferradina	2015–16	Segunda División	0	0	0	0	—		—		0	0
Górnik Zabrze	2016–17	I liga	15	2	—		—		—		15	2
Górnik Zabrze	2017–18	Ekstraklasa	35	4	6	0	—		—		41	4
Górnik Zabrze	2018–19	Ekstraklasa	31	4	3	0	4 (Note: Appearances in UEFA Europa League)	0	—		38	4
Górnik Zabrze	Total		81	10	9	0	4	0	—		94	10
Asteras Tripolis	2019–20	Super League Greece	20	3	2	0	—		—		22	3
Asteras Tripolis	2020–21	Super League Greece	31	2	2	0	—		—		33	2
Asteras Tripolis	Total		51	5	4	0	—		—		55	5
Abha	2021–22	Saudi Professional League	12	0	1	0	—		—		13	0
Atromitos	2022–23	Super League Greece	9	0	1	0	—		—		10	0
Career total			164	15	15	0	4	0	0	0	183	15
