= Driess Saddiki =

Footballer (born 1996)

Personal information
- Date of birth: 9 August 1996 (age 30)
- Place of birth: Venlo, Netherlands
- Height: 1.79 m (5 ft 10 in)
- Position: Midfielder

Youth career
- TSC '04
- SC Irene
- 2014–2015: Fortuna Sittard

Senior career*
Years	Team	Apps	(Gls)
2015–2018	Fortuna Sittard	79	(2)
2018–2022	Willem II	93	(3)
2022–2023	Umm Salal	5	(0)
2023	Abha	15	(0)
2023–2025	Kasımpaşa	9	(0)
2025–	VVV-Venlo	32	(0)
- * Club domestic league appearances and goals as of 28 April 2026

Driess Saddiki (Arabic: دريس صديقي; born 9 August 1996) is a professional footballer who plays as a midfielder. Born in the Netherlands, he represents Morocco internationally.

== Club career ==
Saddiki made his professional debut in the Eerste Divisie for Fortuna Sittard on 8 May 2015 in a game against RKC Waalwijk, replacing Donny de Groot in the 71st minute. On 16 May 2018, he signed a three-year contract with Eredivisie club Willem II.

On 27 June 2022, Willem II announced Saddiki's transfer to Umm Salal in Qatar.

On 6 February 2023, Saddiki joined Saudi Arabian club Abha.

On 23 August 2023, Saddiki signed with Turkish Süper Lig club Kasımpaşa. He was not included in the team's Süper Lig squad for the 2024–25 campaign.

On 12 March 2025, Saddiki joined Eerste Divisie club VVV-Venlo on a short-term contract until the end of the season, with the option to extend.

== International career ==
In October 2020, Saddiki was called up to the Morocco national team for a friendly against DR Congo, but remained on the bench in the game.

== Personal life ==
Born in the Netherlands, Saddiki is of Moroccan descent.
