= Hassan Al-Qayd =

Saudi Arabian footballer

Personal information
- Full name: Hassan Moussa Al-Qayd
- Date of birth: April 13, 1998 (age 28)
- Place of birth: Baish, Saudi Arabia
- Height: 1.69 m (5 ft 7 in)
- Position: Winger

Team information
- Current team: Al-Ain
- Number: 77

Youth career
- Al-Shabab

Senior career*
| Years | Team | Apps | (Gls) |
| 2017–2021 | Al-Shabab | 6 | (0) |
| 2018–2019 | → Al-Khaleej (loan) | 23 | (1) |
| 2020 | → Abha (loan) | 11 | (2) |
| 2020–2021 | → Al-Ahli (loan) | 5 | (0) |
| 2021–2024 | Abha | 16 | (1) |
| 2024–2025 | Al-Batin | 16 | (1) |
| 2026– | Al-Ain | 0 | (0) |
- * Club domestic league appearances and goals

Hassan Al-Qayd (Arabic: حسن القيد; born 13 April 1998) is a Saudi Arabian professional footballer who plays as a winger for Al-Ain.

== Career ==
On 20 August 2024, Al-Qayd joined Al-Batin.

== Career statistics ==
=== Club ===
As of match played 27 May 2024

| Club | Season | League | | | King Cup | | Asia | | Other | | Total | |
| Club | Season | Division | Apps | Goals | Apps | Goals | Apps | Goals | Apps | Goals | Apps | Goals |
|---|---|---|---|---|---|---|---|---|---|---|---|---|
| Al-Shabab | 2016–17 | Pro League | 5 | 0 | 0 | 0 | — | | — | | 5 | 0 |
| Al-Shabab | 2017–18 | Pro League | 1 | 0 | 0 | 0 | — | | — | | 1 | 0 |
| Al-Shabab | Total | | 6 | 0 | 0 | 0 | 0 | 0 | 0 | 0 | 6 | 0 |
| Al-Khaleej (loan) | 2018–19 | MS League | 23 | 1 | 2 | 2 | — | | 2 (Note: Appearance in Pro League play-offs) | 0 | 27 | 3 |
| Abha (loan) | 2019–20 | Pro League | 11 | 2 | 0 | 0 | — | | — | | 11 | 2 |
| Al-Ahli (loan) | 2020–21 | Pro League | 5 | 0 | 1 | 0 | 1 | 0 | — | | 7 | 0 |
| Abha | 2021–22 | Pro League | 10 | 1 | 0 | 0 | — | | — | | 10 | 1 |
| Abha | 2022–23 | Pro League | 6 | 0 | 0 | 0 | — | | — | | 6 | 0 |
| Abha | 2023–24 | Pro League | 0 | 0 | 0 | 0 | — | | — | | 0 | 0 |
| Abha | Total | | 16 | 1 | 0 | 0 | 0 | 0 | 0 | 0 | 16 | 1 |
| Career totals | | | 61 | 4 | 3 | 2 | 1 | 0 | 2 | 0 | 67 | 6 |
