= Prestige Mboungou =

Congolese footballer

Personal information
- Full name: Vieljeux Prestige Mboungou
- Date of birth: 10 July 2000 (age 26)
- Place of birth: Brazzaville, Republic of the Congo
- Height: 1.70 m (5 ft 7 in)
- Position: Winger

Team information
- Current team: TSC
- Number: 29

Senior career*
Years	Team	Apps	(Gls)
2016–2017	CARA Brazzaville		
2018	CSMD Diables Noirs		
2018–2019	MFK Vyškov		
2019	→ Charlotte Independence (loan)	0	(0)
2020–2021	Metalac Gornji Milanovac	42	(7)
2021–2022	Abha	16	(0)
2022	→ Metalac Gornji Milanovac (loan)	15	(1)
2022–2024	Ajman	36	(9)
2024	Baniyas	12	(1)
2024–	TSC	53	(11)

International career^{‡}
2017–	Congo	31	(2)
- * Club domestic league appearances and goals as of 13 June 2026 ‡ National team caps and goals as of 13 December 2024

Vieljeux Prestige Mboungou (born 10 July 2000) is a Congolese professional footballer who plays as a winger for Serbian club TSC and the Congo national football team.

== Club career ==
Prestige Mboungou was born in Brazzaville and he started his senior career at CARA Brazzaville in 2016 where he spent 2 seasons. Next, he played one season with CSMD Diables Noirs in 2018, making a total of 3 consecutive seasons in the Congo Premier League. In summer 2018, after winning the Coupe du Congo, he moved abroad and signed with Czech lower-league club MFK Vyškov. In spring of 2019 he moved to the United States to play on loan with Charlotte Independence but his stay was short and by summer he was back in Europe. In January 2020, Mboungou passed trials and signed a 2 1/2-year contract with Serbian second-tier club FK Metalac Gornji Milanovac. On June 2, 2020, Mbongou renewed his contract to one more year with Metalac.

On 6 August 2021, Mboungou joined Saudi club Abha. On 31 January 2022, he was loaned out to former club Metalac with an option to buy.

On 29 August 2022, Mboungou joined Emirati club Ajman.

On 8 February 2024, Mboungo joined Emirati club Baniyas.

On 4 August 2024, Mboungou joined Serbian club TSC.

== International career ==
At youth level, Mboungou was part of the Congolese U-17 squad since very early, having scored the second goal in the 3–0 victory over Namibia played home at August 21, 2016, for the 2017 Africa U-17 Cup of Nations qualifiers. Then, he was part of the Congolese U-20 squad in the 2019 Africa U-20 Cup of Nations qualifiers game against Senegal, a 2–2 home draw, having scored the first goal at 6 minutes of game.

Being his name, Prestige, correspondent to his performances and with the status the Congolese clubs he represented enjoyed domestically, Mboungou debuted for the Congolese main national team already in 2017 being just 16 at the time. His international debut was in a 2–0 home loss to Senegal in a friendly game played on January 11, that year. He entered as substitute replacing Kessel Tsiba after 58 minutes of game.

After that friendly game, Mboungou was selected to the Congo team that played in the 2018 African Nations Championship in which Congo reached the quarter-finals and in which Mboungou was a regular starter in all games.

== Career statistics ==
=== International ===
As of match played 19 November 2024.

National team	Year	Apps	Goals
Congo	2017	3	0
Congo	2018	6	0
Congo	2019	–	
Congo	2020	–	
Congo	2021	5	0
Congo	2022	6	2
Congo	2023	5	0
Congo	2024	6	0
Total		31	2

Scores and results list Congo's goal tally first, score column indicates score after each Mboungou goal.

List of international goals scored by Prestige Mboungou
No.	Date	Venue	Opponent	Score	Result	Competition
1	29 March 2022	Mardan Sports Complex, Aksu, Turkey	Sierra Leone	1–2	1–2	Friendly
2	24 September 2022	El Bachir Stadium, Mohammedia, Morocco	Madagascar	3–2	3–3	Friendly

== Honours ==
Diables Noirs

- Coupe du Congo: 2018

Individual

- Serbian SuperLiga Player of the Week: 2024–25 (Round 28)
