= Tariq Al-Shahrani =

Saudi Arabian footballer

Personal information
- Full name: Tariq Saeed Al-Shahrani
- Date of birth: February 14, 2000 (age 26)
- Place of birth: Saudi Arabia
- Position: Midfielder

Youth career
- Abha

Senior career*
Years	Team	Apps	(Gls)
2020–2023	Abha	1	(0)
- * Club domestic league appearances and goals as of 12 August 2021

Tariq Al-Shahrani (Arabic: طارق الشهراني; born 14 February 2000) is a Saudi Arabian professional footballer who plays as a midfielder.

== Career ==
Al-Shahrani started his career at the youth teams of Abha. He was first called up to the first team after the 2019–20 season resumed following the COVID-19 pandemic. He made his first-team debut on 12 August 2021 in the 2–1 win against Al-Shabab.
