= Mutair Al-Zahrani =

Saudi Arabian footballer

Mutair Al-Zahrani مطير الزهراني
Personal information
- Full name: Mutair Ali Al-Zahrani
- Date of birth: 22 October 1994 (age 32)
- Place of birth: Saudi Arabia
- Height: 1.74 m (5 ft 9 in)
- Position: Midfielder

Team information
- Current team: Al-Zulfi
- Number: 15

Youth career
- Al-Ain

Senior career*
Years	Team	Apps	(Gls)
2015–2020	Al-Ain	-	(15)
2020–2021	Al-Taawoun	9	(0)
2021–2023	Abha	4	(0)
2023–2024	Hajer	26	(1)
2024–	Al-Zulfi	0	(0)
- * Club domestic league appearances and goals

Mutair Al-Zahrani (Arabic: مطير الزهراني; born 22 October 1994) is a Saudi Arabian professional footballer who plays as a midfielder for Al-Zulfi.

== Career ==
Al-Zahrani started his career at the youth team of Al-Ain and represented the club at every level. Al-Zahrani achieved promotion with Al-Ain to the Pro League for the first time in the club's history. On 17 August 2020, Al-Zahrani joined Al-Taawoun. On 26 June 2021, Al-Zahrani joined Abha on a two-year deal. On 12 August 2023, Al-Zahrani joined Hajer. On 22 July 2024, Al-Zahrani joined Al-Zulfi.
