= Nawaf Al-Sadi =

Saudi Arabian footballer (born 2000)

Personal information
- Full name: Nawaf Amer Al-Sadi
- Date of birth: 21 October 2000 (age 26)
- Place of birth: Muhayil, Saudi Arabia
- Height: 1.68 m (5 ft 6 in)
- Position: Midfielder

Team information
- Current team: Al-Khaleej FC

Youth career
- Al-Shaheed
- Abha

Senior career*
Years	Team	Apps	(Gls)
2020–2023	Abha	22	(5)
2023–2026	Al-Shabab	52	(0)
2026	→ Damac (loan)	10	(0)
2026-	Al-Khaleej FC	0	(0)
- * Club domestic league appearances and goals as of 29 May 2026

Nawaf Al-Sadi (Arabic: نواف الصعدي; born 21 October 2000) is a Saudi Arabian professional footballer, who plays as a midfielder for Pro League side Al-Khaleej FC

== Career ==
Al-Sadi started his career at the youth teams of hometown club Al-Shaheed. He joined Abha on 26 January 2020. He was called up to the first team on 15 April 2021 in the league match against Al-Ain.

He made his first-team debut on 12 August 2021 in the 6–1 defeat to Al-Ittihad. On 31 August 2022, Al-Sadi renewed his contract with Abha.

On 16 December 2022, Al-Sadi made his first start for the club and first appearance in the 2022–23 season in the league match against Al-Tai. On 25 December 2022, Al-Sadi scored his first goal for the club in a 2–0 win against Al-Adalah.

On 2 January 2023, Al-Sadi was awarded the Young Player of the Month award for his impressive performances in the month of December. On 28 February 2023, Al-Sadi was once again awarded the Young Player of the Month award. On 21 August 2023, Al-Sadi joined Al-Shabab on a three-year deal. On 3 February 2026, Al-Sadi joined Damac on a sex-month loan.

== Honours ==
Individual

- Saudi Professional League Young Player of the Month: December 2022, February 2023
