= Tayeb Meziani =

Algerian footballer (born 1996)

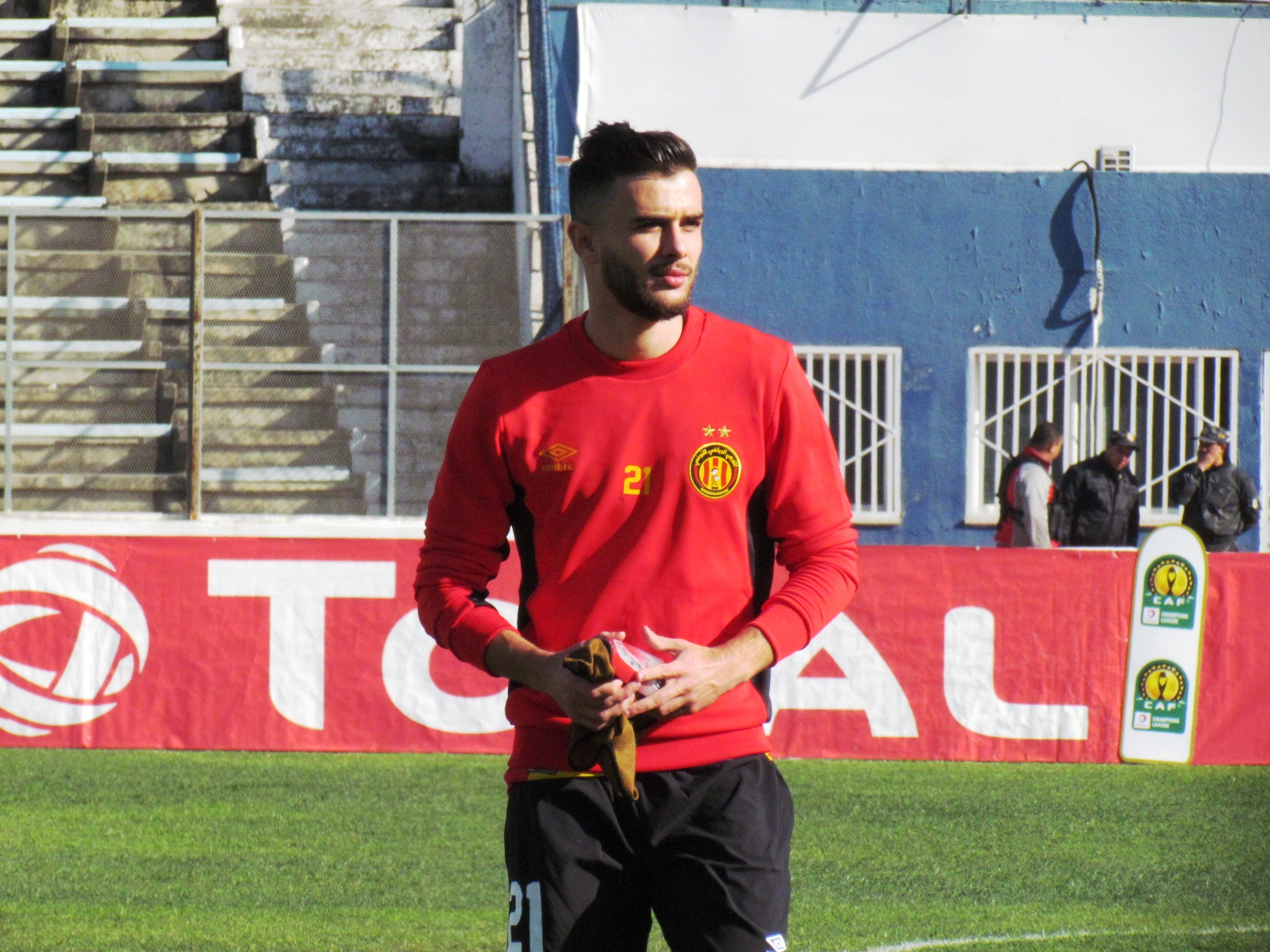
- Meziani with ES Tunis in 2019

Personal information
- Full name: Tayeb Meziani
- Date of birth: 27 February 1996 (age 30)
- Place of birth: Algiers, Algeria
- Height: 1.73 m (5 ft 8 in)
- Position: Forward

Team information
- Current team: Al-Riffa SC

Youth career
- 2009–2015: Paradou AC

Senior career*
Years	Team	Apps	(Gls)
2015–2017	Paradou AC	50	(25)
2017–2018	→ Le Havre II (loan)	5	(1)
2018	→ Stumbras (loan)	4	(0)
2018–2021	ES Tunis	9	(0)
2021–2022	ES Sahel	19	(6)
2022–2023	Abha	19	(0)
2023–2024	Club Africain	7	(3)
2024-2026	MC Alger	21	(1)
2026-	Qadsia SC		
2026-	Al-Riffa SC	0	(0)

International career^{‡}
2017–2018	Algeria U23	6	(1)
2017–	Algeria A'	4	(0)
Medal record
Men's football
Representing Algeria
FIFA Arab Cup
Winner	2021 Qatar
- * Club domestic league appearances and goals as of 19 July 2026 ‡ National team caps and goals as of 12:00, 1 December 2021 (EST)

Tayeb Meziani (Arabic: طيب مزياني; born 27 February 1996) is an Algerian professional footballer who plays as a forward for Al-Riffa SC.

== Club career ==
At the end of the 2016–17 Algerian Ligue Professionnelle 2 season, Meziani was selected as the best player of the season. On 6 January 2019, Meziani played his first game with Espérance Sportive de Tunis against Club Africain; he was selected as one of the best players in the Tunis derby. On 5 February 2026, he joined Kuwaiti club Qadsia SC. On 20 July 2026, he joined Bahraini club Al-Riffa SC.

== International career ==
On 1 June 2017, Meziani was called up to the Algeria national team for the first time for a friendly match against Guinea and a 2019 Africa Cup of Nations qualifier against Togo.

== Career statistics ==
=== International ===
List of international goals scored by Tayeb Meziani
No.	Date	Venue	Opponent	Score	Result	Competition
1	4 December 2021	Al Janoub Stadium, Al Wakrah, Qatar	Lebanon	2–0	2–0	2021 FIFA Arab Cup

== Honours ==
Paradou AC

- Algerian Ligue Professionnelle 2: 2016–17

Espérance de Tunis

- Tunisian Ligue Professionnelle 1: 2018–19
- CAF Champions League: 2019
- Tunisian Super Cup: 2019

Algeria

- FIFA Arab Cup: 2021
