= Zakaria Sami =

Saudi Arabian footballer

Personal information
- Full name: Zakaria Sami Al-Sudani
- Date of birth: July 27, 1992 (age 34)
- Place of birth: Jeddah, Saudi Arabia
- Height: 1.86 m (6 ft 1 in)
- Position: Midfielder

Team information
- Current team: Abha
- Number: 21

Youth career
- ???–2012: Al Ahli

Senior career*
Years	Team	Apps	(Gls)
2012–2016	Al Ahli	3	(0)
2016	→ Hajer (loan)	9	(0)
2016–2018	Al-Khaleej	35	(2)
2018–2019	Al-Nahda	30	(2)
2019–2020	Al-Shoulla	34	(2)
2020–2022	Al-Batin	54	(2)
2022–	Abha	37	(5)

International career
2013–2016	Saudi Arabia U23	7	(0)
- * Club domestic league appearances and goals as of 8 December 2023 (UTC)

Zakaria Sami Al-Sudani (Arabic: زكريا سامي السوداني; born July 27, 1992) is a Saudi Arabian professional football player who plays a midfielder for Abha.

== Career ==
On 3 July 2022, Zakaria Sami joined Abha on a three-year contract.
