= Saeed Al Hamsal =

Saudi Arabian footballer (born 1996)

Personal information
- Full name: Saeed Mubrak Al Hamsal
- Date of birth: 18 April 1996 (age 30)
- Place of birth: Najran, Saudi Arabia
- Height: 1.67 m (5 ft 6 in)
- Position: Right-back

Team information
- Current team: Al-Khaleej
- Number: 39

Senior career*
Years	Team	Apps	(Gls)
2015–2020	Najran	91	(2)
2020–2023	Abha	45	(0)
2023–	Al-Khaleej	20	(1)
- * Club domestic league appearances and goals

Saeed Al Hamsal (Arabic: سعيد آل حمسل; born 18 April 1996), is a Saudi Arabian professional footballer who plays as a defender for Saudi club Al-Khaleej.

== Career ==
On 14 June 2023, Al Hamsal joined Al-Khaleej on a two-year contract.
