= Jehad Al-Zowayed =

Saudi Arabian footballer

Personal information
- Full name: Jehad Al-Zowayed
- Date of birth: January 11, 1989 (age 37)
- Place of birth: Saudi Arabia
- Height: 1.76 m (5 ft 9 1/2 in)
- Positions: Winger; attacking midfielder

Youth career
- Hajer

Senior career*
Years	Team	Apps	(Gls)
2008–2013	Hajer		
2010–2011	→ Al-Fateh (loan)	9	(0)
2013–2014	Al-Khaleej		
2014–2015	Al-Fayha		
2015	Al-Faisaly	0	(0)
2015–2016	Al-Nahda		
2016–2017	Al-Adalah	26	(9)
2017–2019	Hajer	24	(1)
2019–2020	Al-Bukayriyah	22	(8)
2020–2022	Abha	16	(0)
2020–2021	→ Al-Hazem (loan)	31	(4)
2022–2023	Al-Sahel	12	(0)
2023–2024	Al-Taraji	31	(3)
2024–2025	Al-Nahda		
- * Club domestic league appearances and goals as of 9 September 2020

Jehad Al-Zowayed (Arabic: جهاد الزويد; born 11 January 1989) is a Saudi professional footballer who plays as a winger or attacking midfielder.

== Honours ==
Al-Hazem

- MS League: 2020–21
