= Amine Atouchi =

Moroccan footballer

Amine Attouchi
Personal information
- Full name: Amine Attouchi
- Date of birth: 7 January 1992 (age 34)
- Place of birth: Casablanca, Morocco
- Height: 1.86 m (6 ft 1 in)
- Position: Centre back

Team information
- Current team: Al-Adalah
- Number: 19

Youth career
- 2010–2011: Wydad Casablanca

Senior career*
Years	Team	Apps	(Gls)
2011–2018	Wydad Casablanca	66	(8)
2018–2019	Al Dhafra	22	(0)
2019–2023	Abha	104	(6)
2023–2024	Al-Batin	26	(2)
2024–	Al-Adalah	0	(0)

International career^{‡}
2016–	Morocco	1	(0)
- * Club domestic league appearances and goals as of 9 September 2020 ‡ National team caps and goals as of 20 March 2017

Amine Attouchi (born 7 January 1992) is a Moroccan footballer who plays as a defender for Saudi Arabian club Al-Adalah.

He was called up for 2017 Africa Cup of Nations.

== Honours ==
Wydad Casablanca

- CAF Champions League: 2017
- Botola: 2015, 2017
