= Muhannad Al-Qaydhi =

Saudi Arabian footballer

Personal information
- Full name: Muhannad Ahmed Al-Qaydhi
- Date of birth: May 26, 1998 (age 28)
- Place of birth: Buraidah, Saudi Arabia
- Height: 1.87 m (6 ft 2 in)
- Position: Centre-back

Team information
- Current team: Al-Okhdood
- Number: 98

Youth career
- Al-Raed

Senior career*
Years	Team	Apps	(Gls)
2017–2020	Al-Raed	0	(0)
2019–2020	→ Al-Bukiryah (loan)	23	(0)
2020–2022	Abha	16	(0)
2022–2024	Al-Fayha	29	(0)
2024–	Al-Okhdood	26	(1)
- * Club domestic league appearances and goals as of 26 May 2024

Muhannad Al-Qaydhi (Arabic: مهند القيضي, romanized: Mohanad Al Qaydhi or Mohanad Alqaydhi; born 26 May 1998) is a Saudi Arabian professional footballer who plays as a centre-back for Al-Okhdood.

== Career ==
Al-Qaydhi began his career at hometown club, Al-Raed. He was first called up to the first team during the 2016–17 season and was officially promoted in the 2017–18 season. On 19 August 2019, he joined Al-Bukiryah on loan. On 1 October 2020, Al-Qaydhi signed with Abha on a free transfer. He made his debut for Abha on 12 August 2021 in a league match against Al-Shabab. On 2 August 2022, he joined Al-Fayha on a two-year deal. Most recently, on 2 September 2024, Al-Qaydhi signed with Al-Okhdood.
