= Mansour Jawhar =

Saudi Arabian footballer (born 1995)

Personal information
- Full name: Mansour Salem Jawhar
- Date of birth: 19 March 1995 (age 31)
- Place of birth: Riyadh, Saudi Arabia
- Height: 1.80 m (5 ft 11 in)
- Position: Goalkeeper

Team information
- Current team: Al-Bukiryah
- Number: 1

Youth career
- Al-Shabab

Senior career*
Years	Team	Apps	(Gls)
2014–2018	Al-Shabab	7	(0)
2017–2018	→ Al-Qaisumah (loan)	8	(0)
2018–2019	Al-Shoulla	12	(0)
2019–2024	Abha	1	(0)
2020–2021	→ Al-Fayha (loan)	3	(0)
2024–2025	Hajer	19	(0)
2025–	Al-Bukiryah	0	(0)

International career
2015–2017	Saudi Arabia U23		
- * Club domestic league appearances and goals as of 9 September 2020

Mansour Jawhar (Arabic: منصور جوهر; born 19 March 1995) is a Saudi Arabian professional footballer who currently plays for Al-Bukiryah as a goalkeeper.

== Career ==
On 29 July 2019, Jawhar joined Abha. On 18 October 2020, Jawhar joined Al-Fayha on loan.

On 24 September 2024, Jawhar joined Hajer.

On 10 September 2025, Jawhar joined Al-Bukiryah.
