= Saleh Al-Amri =

Saudi Arabian footballer

Personal information
- Full name: Saleh Mohammed Al Jamaan Al-Amri
- Date of birth: 14 October 1993 (age 33)
- Place of birth: Khobar, Saudi Arabia
- Height: 1.76 m (5 ft 9 1/2 in)
- Positions: Winger; forward

Team information
- Current team: Al-Khaleej
- Number: 93

Youth career
- Al Qadsiah FC

Senior career*
Years	Team	Apps	(Gls)
2011–2014	Al Qadsiah FC		
2014–2018	Al-Ahli Saudi FC	28	(3)
2016–2017	→ Al-Ettifaq FC (loan)	21	(2)
2018–2019	Al-Wehda	20	(0)
2019–2020	Al-Ettifaq FC	18	(3)
2020–2023	Abha Club	86	(10)
2023–2025	Al-Ittihad	29	(3)
2024–2025	→ Al Raed FC (loan)	33	(6)
2025–	Al-Khaleej FC	28	(4)

International career^{‡}
2014–2016	Saudi Arabia U23	3	(0)
2017–	Saudi Arabia	3	(0)
- * Club domestic league appearances and goals as of 28 August 2026 ‡ National team caps and goals as of 20:31, 28 December 2017 (UTC)

Saleh Al Jamaan Al-Amri (Arabic: صالح آل جمعان العمري; born 14 October 1993) is a Saudi professional footballer who plays as a winger for Pro League club Al-Khaleej and the Saudi Arabia national team.

== Career ==
On 10 May 2014, Al-Amri joined Al-Ahli on a four-year contract. On 25 August 2016, Al-Amri joined Al-Ettifaq FC on a one-year loan. On 17 June 2018, Al-Amri was released from his contract by Al-Ahli.

On 14 July 2018, Al-Amri joined Al-Wehda on a free transfer.

On 20 July 2019, Al-Amri joined Al-Ettifaq FC on a three-year contract. As part of the swap deal, Mohammed Al-Saiari joined Al-Wehda.

On 28 September 2020, Al-Amri joined Abha Club on a two-year contract. On 1 February 2022, Al-Amri renewed his contract with Abha for another two years.

On 22 July 2023, Al-Amri joined Al-Ittihad on a three-year contract. On 13 August 2024, Al-Amri joined Al Raed FC on a one-year loan.

On 9 August 2025, Al-Amri joined Al-Khaleej FC. He made his debut for the club on 29 August by coming off the bench during the half-time mark and scored in the 64th minute in a thrashing 4–1 away victory against Al Shabab.

== Honours ==
Al-Ahli

- Saudi Crown Prince Cup: 2014–15
- Saudi Professional League: 2015–16
- King Cup: 2016
