= Abdullah Al-Shammeri (footballer, born 1991) =

Saudi Arabian footballer (born 1991)

Personal information
- Full name: Abdullah Hamdan Redha Al Shammeri
- Date of birth: 24 November 1991 (age 34)
- Place of birth: Riyadh, Saudi Arabia
- Height: 1.86 m (6 ft 1 in)
- Position: Goalkeeper

Team information
- Current team: Al-Tai
- Number: 1

Youth career
- –2011: Al-Nassr

Senior career*
Years	Team	Apps	(Gls)
2011–2017	Al-Nassr	8	(0)
2016	→ Al-Fayha (loan)	13	(0)
2017–2019	Al-Raed	1	(0)
2018	→ Al-Kawkab (loan)	1	(0)
2019–2020	Al-Kawkab	29	(0)
2020–2024	Abha	8	(0)
2024–	Al-Tai	0	(0)
- * Club domestic league appearances and goals as of 7 August 2023

Abdullah Al-Shammeri (Arabic: عبدالله الشمري; born 24 November 1991) is a Saudi Arabian football goalkeeper who currently plays for Al-Tai.

== Career ==
At the club level, Abdullah Al-Shammeri started his career at Al-Nassr.

On 24 August 2024, Al-Shammeri joined Al-Tai.

== Honours ==
=== Clubs ===
Al-Nassr

- Saudi Professional League 2013–14
- Saudi Professional League 2014–15
- Saudi Crown Prince Cup: 2013–14
