= Muath Afaneh =

Jordanian footballer

Muath Afaneh معاذ عفانة
Personal information
- Full name: Muath Adnan Afaneh
- Date of birth: January 28, 1991 (age 35)
- Place of birth: Saudi Arabia
- Height: 1.78 m (5 ft 10 in)
- Position: Forward

Youth career
- –2010: Al-Hussein

Senior career*
| Years | Team | Apps | (Gls) |
| 2010–2014 | Al-Hussein | | |
| 2014 | → Al-Sareeh (loan) | | |
| 2014–2016 | Al-Fayha | 22 | (12) |
| 2016 | Al-Nahda | 10 | (5) |
| 2016–2017 | Al-Jazeera | | |
| 2017–2018 | Al-Qaisumah | 40 | (15) |
| 2018–2019 | Al-Shoulla | 21 | (2) |
| 2019–2020 | Al-Orobah | 8 | (4) |
| 2020–2022 | Abha | 23 | (2) |
| 2022–2023 | Al-Salt | | |
| 2023 | Al-Lewaa | | |
| 2023–2024 | Jubbah | | |
| 2024 | Sajer | | |
- * Club domestic league appearances and goals as of 9 September 2020

Muath Afaneh (Arabic: معاذ عفانة, born 1 January 1991) is a Jordanian professional footballer born in Saudi Arabia who plays as a forward.

== Career ==
Muath Afaneh started his career at the Al-Hussein in 2010. On 16 January 2014, Afaneh signed for Al-Sareeh on loan from Al-Hussein. On 16 July 2014, Afaneh joined with Al-Fayha . On 22 December 2015, Afaneh joined with Al-Nahda . On 15 October 2016, Afaneh joined with Al-Jazeera . On 20 December 2016, Afaneh joined with Al-Qaisumah . On 16 July 2018, Afaneh joined with Al-Shoulla . On 18 July 2019, Afaneh joined with Al-Orobah . On 10 January 2020, Afaneh joined Saudi Professional League side Abha. On 27 July 2022, Afaneh joined Jordanian Pro League side Al-Salt. On 2 February 2023, Afaneh joined Saudi Second Division side Al-Lewaa.
