= Musab Habkor =

Saudi Arabian footballer

Musab Habkor مصعب حبكور
Personal information
- Full name: Musab Mohammed Muharraq Habkor
- Date of birth: 24 January 1999 (age 27)
- Place of birth: Saudi Arabia
- Height: 1.66 m (5 ft 5 in)
- Position: Midfielder

Team information
- Current team: Mudhar
- Number: 16

Youth career
- Al-Amjad
- Abha

Senior career*
Years	Team	Apps	(Gls)
2019–2023	Abha	2	(0)
2020–2021	→ Najran (loan)	30	(1)
2021–2022	→ Al-Kawkab (loan)	22	(2)
2023–2024	Al-Qaisumah	18	(0)
2024–2025	Tuwaiq		
2025–	Mudhar		
- * Club domestic league appearances and goals

Musab Habkor (Arabic: مصعب حبكور, born 24 January 1999) is a Saudi Arabian professional footballer who plays as a midfielder for Mudhar.

== Career ==
Habkor began his career at the Al-Amjad before moving to the youth team of Abha. He was promoted to the first team in 2019. He made his debut on 2 November 2019 in the 4–0 loss to Al-Nassr. On 25 October 2020, Habkor joined Najran on loan. On 27 August 2021, Habkor joined Al-Kawkab on loan. On 13 July 2023, Habkor joined Al-Qaisumah on a free transfer. On 24 July 2024, Habkor joined Tuwaiq. On 24 September 2025, Habkor joined Mudhar.
