= Fahad Al-Jumayah =

Saudi Arabian footballer (born 1995)

Fahad Al-Jumayah فهد الجميعة
Personal information
- Full name: Fahad Mohammed Al-Jumayah
- Date of birth: 10 May 1995 (age 31)
- Place of birth: Hafar al-Batin, Saudi Arabia
- Height: 1.75 m (5 ft 9 in)
- Positions: Full-back; winger

Team information
- Current team: Al-Ula
- Number: 14

Youth career
- ????–2013: Al-Sadd
- 2013–2017: Al-Nassr

Senior career*
Years	Team	Apps	(Gls)
2017–2021	Al-Nassr	41	(2)
2020–2021	→ Abha (loan)	22	(0)
2021–2024	Abha	71	(4)
2024–2025	Al-Taawoun	22	(0)
2025–	Al-Ula	0	(0)

International career^{‡}
- Saudi Arabia U-23
- * Club domestic league appearances and goals as of 10 November 2023 ‡ National team caps and goals as of 13 January 2019

Fahad Al-Jumayah (Arabic: فهد الجميعة; born 10 May 1995) is a Saudi Arabian professional footballer who plays as a right-back or a right-midfielder for Al-Ula.

== Career ==
On 13 October 2020, Al-Jumayah joined Abha on a one-year loan from Al-Nassr. On 13 July 2021, Al-Jumayah joined Abha on a permanent deal.

On 19 July 2024, Al-Jumayah joined Al-Taawoun on a two-year contract.

On 12 September 2025, Al-Jumayah joined Al-Ula.

== Honours ==
Al-Nassr

- Saudi Pro League: 2018–19
- Saudi Super Cup: 2019
