= Prince Sultan bin Abdulaziz Sports City Stadium =

Saudi Arabian stadium in Abha

Coordinates: 18°18′38″N 42°35′54″E

- Al-Mahalah Stadium
- Interactive map of Prince Sultan bin Abdulaziz Sports City Stadium
- Location: Abha, Saudi Arabia
- Owner: General Presidency of Youth Welfare
- Operator: Ministry of Sport (Saudi Arabia)
- Capacity: 25,000.

Construction
- Groundbreaking: June 2026; 2 months ago

Tenants
- Abha (1984–2025); Damac

Prince Sultan bin Abdulaziz Sports City, also referred to as Al-Mahalah Stadium, is a versatile stadium located in Abha, Saudi Arabia. Primarily used for football matches, it serves as the home ground for both Abha and Damac clubs. The stadium has a seating capacity of 20,000 spectators.

== History ==
It is named after Prince Sultan bin Abdulaziz, former Crown Prince of Saudi Arabia.

Prince Sultan bin Abdulaziz Stadium has been the venue for multiple editions of both the International Friendship Tournament and the International Friendly Elite Championship, with participation from teams such as Al-Hilal, Al-Shabab, the Italian club Bologna, and various others.

== See also ==
- List of football stadiums in Saudi Arabia
