= 2018–19 Ohod Club season =

Ohod
2018–19 season
- President: Saud Al-Harbi
- Manager: Francisco Arce (until 23 November); Paulo Alves (from 27 November until 14 January); Ammar Souayah (from 19 January)
- Stadium: Prince Mohammed bin Abdul Aziz Stadium
- SPL: 16th (relegated)
- King Cup: Round of 32 (knocked out by Al-Taqadom)
- Top goalscorer: League: Carl Medjani; Saqer Otaif; Mohammed Majrashi; Ribamar (3); All: Carl Medjani; Saqer Otaif; Mohammed Majrashi; Ribamar (3)
- Highest home attendance: 20,207 vs Al-Hilal (12 December 2018)
- Lowest home attendance: 1,680 vs Al-Fayha (12 April 2019)
- Average home league attendance: 7,075
Home colours	Away colours
- All statistics correct as of 16 May 2019.

The 2018–19 season was Ohod's second consecutive season in Pro League and their 83rd year in existence. This season Ohod participated in the Pro League and King Cup.

The season covers the period from 1 July 2018 to 30 June 2019.

== Players ==
=== Squad information ===
As of 2 April 2019

Note: Flags indicate national team as defined under FIFA eligibility rules; some limited exceptions apply. Players may hold more than one non-FIFA nationality.

No.	Pos.	Nation	Player
4	DF	CMR	Adolphe Teikeu
5	DF	KSA	Omar Mohammed
8	MF	SDN	Mohammed Al-Dhaw
11	MF	KSA	Rakan Al-Hafdhi
12	DF	ALG	Carl Medjani
13	MF	KSA	Moataz Tombakti (on loan from Al-Fayha)
14	MF	SYR	Tamer Haj Mohamad
15	FW	KSA	Saqer Otaif
17	DF	KSA	Sami Kassar
18	FW	KSA	Mohammed Majrashi (on loan from Al-Faisaly)
19	MF	KSA	Abdullah Majrashi (on loan from Al-Ahli)
21	MF	KSA	Mohammed Attiyah
22	GK	KSA	Abdoh Besisi
25	MF	KSA	Ahmed Saleh
27	MF	KSA	Fahad Al-Rashidi (on loan from Al-Hilal)

No.	Pos.	Nation	Player
29	MF	KSA	Fahad Hamad
30	MF	MAR	Mohamed Fouzair (on loan from Al-Nassr)
33	GK	KSA	Hossam Abdulmajeed
39	DF	TUN	Ghazi Abderrazzak
40	MF	KSA	Ali Al-Asmari (on loan from Al-Ahli)
45	DF	KSA	Zeyad Al-Hunayti
50	DF	KSA	Osama Aashor
55	FW	NIG	Moussa Maâzou
66	GK	KSA	Khalid Sharahili
71	FW	KSA	Ismael Al-Maghrebi
75	DF	TUN	Aymen Belaïd
77	GK	KSA	Abdullah Al-Owaishir (on loan from Al-Nassr)
80	MF	KSA	Nawaf Mashea
89	DF	KSA	Majed Hazzazi

==== Out on loan ====
Note: Flags indicate national team as defined under FIFA eligibility rules; some limited exceptions apply. Players may hold more than one non-FIFA nationality.

No. / Pos. / Nation / Player; 16 / MF / KSA / Abdullah Al-Sohaymi (at Al-Qaisumah until 30 June 2019)	No. / Pos. / Nation / Player; 32 / DF / KSA / Abdullah Al-Rashidi (at Al-Ain until 30 June 2019)

== Transfers ==
=== In ===
Date	Pos.	Name	Previous club	Fee	Source
11 May 2018	FW	(Burkina Faso) Haron Eisa	(Saudi Arabia) Al-Watani	Free	
29 May 2018	DF	(Cameroon) Adolphe Teikeu	(France) Sochaux	Free	
1 June 2018	FW	(Saudi Arabia) Islam Seraj	(Saudi Arabia) Al-Ahli	Free	
3 June 2018	GK	(Morocco) Zouhair Laaroubi	(Morocco) Wydad AC	Free	
12 June 2018	MF	(Brazil) Bruno Michel	(Brazil) São Bernardo	Free	
23 June 2018	DF	(Brazil) Apodi	(Brazil) Chapecoense	Free	
11 July 2018	MF	(Syria) Tamer Haj Mohamad	(Oman) Dhofar	Free	
14 July 2018	MF	(Ghana) Carlos Ohene	(Bulgaria) Beroe Stara Zagora	€250,000	
17 July 2018	DF	(Bosnia and Herzegovina) Enes Sipović	(Morocco) RS Berkane	€200,000	
20 July 2018	DF	(Saudi Arabia) Hussein Abdulghani	(Bulgaria) Vereya	Free	
3 August 2018	FW	(Saudi Arabia) Naif Hazazi	(Romania) Botoșani	Free	
25 August 2018	FW	(Saudi Arabia) Raed Al-Ghamdi	(Saudi Arabia) Al-Ahli	Free	
19 December 2018	MF	(Saudi Arabia) Fahad Hamad	(Saudi Arabia) Al-Faisaly	Free	
1 January 2019	DF	(Saudi Arabia) Jufain Al-Bishi	(Saudi Arabia) Al-Taawoun	Free	
1 January 2019	FW	(Saudi Arabia) Ismael Al-Maghrebi	(Saudi Arabia) Al-Taawoun	Free	
1 January 2019	FW	(Saudi Arabia) Saqer Otaif	(Saudi Arabia) Al-Raed	Free	
7 January 2019	DF	(Saudi Arabia) Majed Hazazi	(Saudi Arabia) Al-Fateh	Free	
7 January 2019	DF	(Algeria) Carl Medjani	(Turkey) Sivasspor	Free	
24 January 2019	DF	(Tunisia) Ghazi Abderrazzak	(Tunisia) ES Sahel	Free	
26 January 2019	GK	(Uzbekistan) Ignatiy Nesterov	(Uzbekistan) Lokomotiv Tashkent	Free	
17 February 2019	GK	(Saudi Arabia) Khalid Sharahili	(Saudi Arabia) Al-Faisaly	Free	
27 February 2019	DF	(Tunisia) Aymen Belaïd	(Bulgaria) SiLevski Sofiavasspor	Free	
2 April 2019	FW	(Niger) Moussa Maâzou	(France) RC Lens	Free	

=== Loans in ===
Date	Pos.	Name	Parent club	End date	Source
7 June 2018	MF	(Saudi Arabia) Talal Majrashi	(Saudi Arabia) Al-Fayha	11 December 2018	
17 July 2018	MF	(Saudi Arabia) Moataz Tombakti	(Saudi Arabia) Al-Fayha	End of season	
16 August 2018	FW	(Brazil) Ribamar	(Egypt) Pyramids	31 December 2018	
25 August 2018	MF	(Saudi Arabia) Ali Al-Asmari	(Saudi Arabia) Al-Ahli	End of season	
7 January 2019	FW	(Saudi Arabia) Mohammed Majrashi	(Saudi Arabia) Al-Faisaly	End of season	
13 January 2019	MF	(Morocco) Mohamed Fouzair	(Saudi Arabia) Al-Nassr	End of season	
14 January 2019	FW	(Egypt) Ahmed Gomaa	(Egypt) Al-Masry	22 March 2019	
19 January 2019	MF	(Saudi Arabia) Fahad Al-Rashidi	(Saudi Arabia) Al-Hilal	End of season	
23 January 2019	MF	(Egypt) Moamen Zakaria	(Egypt) Al-Ahly	24 February 2019	
4 February 2019	MF	(Saudi Arabia) Abdullah Majrashi	(Saudi Arabia) Al-Ahli	End of season	
17 February 2019	GK	(Saudi Arabia) Abdullah Al-Owaishir	(Saudi Arabia) Al-Nassr	End of season	

=== Out ===
Date	Pos.	Name	New club	Fee	Source
4 May 2018	MF	(Saudi Arabia) Mohammed Harzan	(Saudi Arabia) Al-Taawoun	Free	
11 May 2018	GK	(Algeria) Azzedine Doukha	(Saudi Arabia) Al-Raed	Free	
29 May 2018	DF	(Algeria) Nacereddine Khoualed	(Algeria) MC Oran	Free	
30 May 2018	DF	(Saudi Arabia) Shafi Al-Dossari		Released	
30 May 2018	DF	(Saudi Arabia) Abdulrahman Al-Haidari		Released	
30 May 2018	DF	(Ghana) Isaac Vorsah		Released	
30 May 2018	MF	(Saudi Arabia) Khaled Al-Muwallad		Released	
30 May 2018	MF	(Saudi Arabia) Abdulaziz Al-Sharid	(Saudi Arabia) Al-Taawoun	End of loan	
30 May 2018	MF	(Saudi Arabia) Badar Badi		Released	
30 May 2018	MF	(Saudi Arabia) Mustafa Bassas	(Saudi Arabia) Al-Ahli	End of loan	
30 May 2018	MF	(Mali) Mamoutou N'Diaye		Released	
30 May 2018	FW	(Saudi Arabia) Raed Al-Ghamdi	(Saudi Arabia) Al-Ahli	End of loan	
30 May 2018	FW	(Saudi Arabia) Mazen Al-Johani		Released	
30 May 2018	FW	(Tunisia) Hichem Essifi	(Tunisia) Monastir	End of loan	
16 June 2018	FW	(Algeria) Mohamed Boulaouidet	(Algeria) JS Saoura	Free	
13 July 2018	MF	(Saudi Arabia) Ayman Ftayni	(Saudi Arabia) Al-Orobah	Free	
17 July 2018	MF	(Oman) Mohsin Al-Khaldi	(Oman) Sohar	Free	
27 July 2018	DF	(Saudi Arabia) Mousa Asere	(Saudi Arabia) Al-Watani	Free	
19 August 2018	DF	(Saudi Arabia) Mohammad Naji	(Saudi Arabia) Al-Jeel	Free	
8 September 2018	GK	(Saudi Arabia) Fares Al-Johani	(Saudi Arabia) Al-Kholood	Free	
17 September 2018	DF	(Saudi Arabia) Salek Ahmed	(Saudi Arabia) Al-Washm	Free	
25 September 2018	FW	(Saudi Arabia) Raed Al-Ghamdi	(Saudi Arabia) Al-Batin	Free	
31 October 2018	FW	(Saudi Arabia) Naif Hazazi		Released	
21 November 2018	DF	(Saudi Arabia) Muhannad Al-Shanqeeti	(Saudi Arabia) Al-Ittihad	Undisclosed	
31 December 2018	FW	(Brazil) Ribamar	(Egypt) Pyramids	End of loan	
7 January 2019	MF	(Saudi Arabia) Sumayhan Al-Nabit	(Saudi Arabia) Abha	Free	
13 January 2019	MF	(Brazil) Bruno Michel	(Brazil) São Bernardo	Free	
14 January 2019	DF	(Saudi Arabia) Hussein Abdulghani	(Saudi Arabia) Al-Ahli	Free	
16 January 2019	FW	(Saudi Arabia) Islam Seraj	(Saudi Arabia) Damac	Free	
17 January 2019	GK	(Morocco) Zouhair Laaroubi	(Morocco) Moghreb Tétouan	Free	
29 January 2019	FW	(Burkina Faso) Haron Eisa	(Saudi Arabia) Al-Tai	Free	
6 February 2019	DF	(Bosnia and Herzegovina) Enes Sipović	(Bosnia and Herzegovina) Željezničar	Free	
11 February 2019	DF	(Brazil) Apodi	(Brazil) CSA	Free	
16 February 2019	GK	(Uzbekistan) Ignatiy Nesterov		Released	
19 February 2019	MF	(Ghana) Carlos Ohene	(Bulgaria) Beroe Stara Zagora	Free	
24 February 2019	MF	(Egypt) Moamen Zakaria	(Egypt) Al-Ahly	End of loan	
3 March 2019	DF	(Saudi Arabia) Jufain Al-Bishi		Released	
22 March 2019	FW	(Egypt) Ahmed Gomaa	(Egypt) Al-Masry	End of loan	

=== Loans out ===
Date	Pos.	Name	Subsequent club	End date	Source
3 February 2019	DF	(Saudi Arabia) Abdullah Al-Rashidi	(Saudi Arabia) Al-Ain	End of season	
3 February 2019	MF	(Saudi Arabia) Abdullah Al-Sohaymi	(Saudi Arabia) Al-Qaisumah	End of season	

== Competitions ==
=== Overall ===
Competition	Started round	Current position / round	Final position / round	First match	Last match
Pro League	—	—	16th	30 August 2018	16 May 2019
King Cup	Round of 64	—	Round of 32	1 January 2019	15 January 2019

Last Updated: 16 May 2019

=== Pro League ===
==== League table ====
Pos	Team	Pld	W	D	L	GF	GA	GD	Pts	Qualification or relegation
12	Al-Fayha	30	9	5	16	36	52	−16	32	
13	Al-Hazem (O)	30	7	10	13	33	50	−17	31	Qualification for Relegation play-offs
14	Al-Qadsiah (R)	30	8	4	18	34	51	−17	28	Relegation to Prince Mohammad bin Salman League
15	Al-Batin (R)	30	7	4	19	29	53	−24	25	Relegation to Prince Mohammad bin Salman League
16	Ohod (R)	30	5	6	19	25	62	−37	21	Relegation to Prince Mohammad bin Salman League

Source: spl.com
Rules for classification: 1) Points; 2) Head-to-head points; 3) Head-to-head goal difference; 4) Total goal difference; 5) Total goals scored; 6) Play-off (only for deciding champion, relegation and AFC competitions participation).
(O) Play-off winners; (R) Relegated

==== Results summary ====
Overall								Home						Away					
Pld	W	D	L	GF	GA	GD	Pts	W	D	L	GF	GA	GD	W	D	L	GF	GA	GD
30	5	6	19	25	62	−37	21	4	2	9	16	23	−7	1	4	10	9	39	−30

Last updated: 16 May 2019.
Source: Competitive matches

==== Results by round ====
Round	1	2	3	4	5	6	7	8	9	10	11	12	13	14	15	16	17	18	19	20	21	22	23	24	25	26	27	28	29	30
Ground	H	H	A	A	H	A	H	H	H	A	H	A	H	A	H	A	A	H	H	A	A	H	A	A	H	A	H	A	A	H
Result	L	L	L	D	L	D	L	W	D	L	L	L	L	L	L	L	L	W	W	L	L	D	D	D	L	L	L	L	W	W
Position	14	15	14	15	15	15	15	14	15	15	15	15	16	16	16	16	16	16	16	16	16	16	16	16	16	16	16	16	16	16

Updated to match(es) played on 16 May 2019. Source: Competitive matches
A = Away; H = Home; W = Win; D = Draw; L = Loss

==== Matches ====
All times are local, AST (UTC+3).

Win Draw Loss Postponed

30 August 2018 1	Ohod	1–2	Al-Nassr	Medina
19:15	Petros 14' (o.g.); Apodi (yellow card) 61'; Abdulghani (yellow card) 82'	Report	Al-Shehri 12'; Amrabat (yellow card) 90', (goal) 90+6'; Al Mansor (yellow card) 90+5'	Stadium: Prince Mohammed bin Abdul Aziz Stadium; Attendance: 17,794; Referee: Pavel Královec (Czech Republic)

14 September 2018 2	Ohod	0–2	Al-Ahli	Medina
19:05	Haj Mohamad (yellow card) 29'; Attiyah (yellow card) 78'; Hazazi (yellow card) 81'	Report	Souza (yellow card) 14'; Djaniny 35'; Alexis (red card) 60'; Assiri 72'	Stadium: Prince Mohammed bin Abdul Aziz Stadium; Attendance: 18,056; Referee: Simon Lee Evans (Wales)

21 September 2018 3	Al-Faisaly	2–0	Ohod	Al Majma'ah
18:35	Calderón (yellow card) 45', (goal) 57'; Hawsawi (yellow card) 60'; Al-Bishi (yellow card) 61', (goal) 90+2'; Balghaith (yellow card) 79'; Majrashi (yellow card) 83'; Rogerinho (yellow card) 87'	Report	Teikeu (yellow card) 26'; Šipović (yellow card) 84'	Stadium: King Salman Sport City Stadium; Attendance: 815; Referee: Kevin Blom (Netherlands)

27 September 2018 4	Al-Ettifaq	0–0	Ohod	Dammam
18:10	Al-Robeai (yellow card) 67'; Al-Sobeai (yellow card) 71'	Report		Stadium: Prince Mohamed bin Fahd Stadium; Attendance: 4,200; Referee: Ravshan Irmatov (Uzbekistan)

5 October 2018 5	Ohod	0–1	Al-Batin	Medina
18:45	Ribamar (yellow card) 9'; Abdulghani (yellow card) 57'; Ohene (yellow card) 80'	Report	João Gabriel (yellow card) 45+2'; Arango (yellow card) 59'; Al-Johani 90+3'	Stadium: Prince Mohammed bin Abdul Aziz Stadium; Attendance: 4,704; Referee: Tomasz Musiał (Poland)

19 October 2018 6	Al-Ittihad	1–1	Ohod	Jeddah
20:00	Jonas (yellow card) 23'; Valdívia 72'	Report	Ohene (yellow card) 45+1' (yellow-red card) 53'; Ribamar 68'; Mohamad (yellow card) 75'; Besisi (yellow card) 81'; Abdulghani (yellow card) 85'; Aashor (yellow card) 90+7'	Stadium: King Abdullah Sports City; Attendance: 33,857; Referee: Viktor Kassai (Hungary)

26 October 2018 7	Ohod	1–3	Al-Wehda	Medina
18:25	Teikeu (yellow card) 64'; Al-Dhaw 85'; Aashor (yellow card) 90+6'	Report	Marcos Guilherme 48'; Al-Zori 61'; Otero 68'	Stadium: Prince Mohammed bin Abdul Aziz Stadium; Referee: Ivan Bebek (Croatia)

2 November 2018 8	Ohod	1–0	Al-Taawoun	Medina
18:20	Kassar 45'; Laaroubi (yellow card) 72'; Mohammed (yellow card) 77'; Haj Mohamad (yellow card) 84'	Report		Stadium: Prince Mohammed bin Abdul Aziz Stadium; Attendance: 4,360; Referee: Simon Lee Evans (Wales)

8 November 2018 9	Ohod	3–3	Al-Hazem	Medina
18:15	Ribamar 21', 90+4' (pen.); Abdulghani 61' (pen.); Al-Dhaw (yellow card) 64'	Report	Al-Saiari 7', 11', 72'; Al-Barakah (yellow card) 19'; Al-Ayyaf (yellow card) 49'	Stadium: Prince Mohammed bin Abdul Aziz Stadium; Attendance: 7,139; Referee: Szymon Marciniak (Poland)

22 November 2018 10	Al-Fateh	4–0	Ohod	Al-Hasa
14:45	Oueslati 24'; Pedro 26'; Al-Yousef (yellow card) 38'; Bangoura 64'; Chenihi 79'; Hamzah (yellow card) 88'	Report		Stadium: Prince Abdullah bin Jalawi Stadium; Attendance: 1,651; Referee: Svein Oddvar Moen (Norway)

6 December 2018 12	Al-Shabab	1–0	Ohod	Riyadh
17:45	Luiz Antônio 50'; Al-Raheb (yellow card) 76'; Euller (yellow card) 90+3'	Report	Šipović (yellow card) 21'; Mohammed (yellow card) 52'; Al-Hafdhi (yellow card) 75'	Stadium: Prince Faisal bin Fahd Stadium; Attendance: 1,214; Referee: Pavel Královec (Czech Republic)

12 December 2018 11	Ohod	0–1	Al-Hilal	Medina
18:20		Report	Gomis 54' (pen.)	Stadium: Prince Mohammed bin Abdul Aziz Stadium; Attendance: 20,207; Referee: Svein Oddvar Moen (Norway)

17 December 2018 13	Ohod	1–3	Al-Qadsiah	Medina
18:20	Teikeu 80'	Report	Oumarou 22'; Al-Zain 32'; Belal (yellow card) 72'; Adnan F. (yellow card) 76'; Camara 78'	Stadium: Prince Mohammed bin Abdul Aziz Stadium; Attendance: 7,110; Referee: Mark Clattenburg (England)

22 December 2018 14	Al-Fayha	3–0	Ohod	Al Majma'ah
15:15	Gómez (yellow card) 11'; Al-Yami 40', (yellow card) 40'; Asprilla 74', 90+4' (pen.)	Report	Mohamad (yellow card) 49'; Teikeu (yellow card) 57'; Laaroubi (yellow card) 90+3'	Stadium: King Salman Sport City Stadium; Attendance: 732; Referee: Sergei Karasev (Russia)

30 December 2018 15	Ohod	0–1	Al-Raed	Medina
15:45	Mohammed (yellow card) 18' (yellow-red card) 87'; Attiyah (yellow card) 56'; Ashoor (yellow card) 63'	Report	Al-Shehri 54' (pen.), (yellow card) 78'; El Ghanassy (yellow card) 66'; Al-Shamekh (yellow card) 90+5'	Stadium: Prince Mohammed bin Abdul Aziz Stadium; Attendance: 2,800; Referee: Viktor Kassai (Hungary)

11 January 2019 16	Al-Ahli	5–1	Ohod	Mecca
18:35	Djaniny 7', 15', 33', 65', 80'; Al-Harbi (yellow card) 45+1'; Hindi (yellow card) 85'	Report	Teikeu (yellow card) 27'; Otaif 58'; Medjani (yellow card) 59'	Stadium: King Abdul Aziz Stadium; Attendance: 1,605; Referee: Paolo Mazzoleni (Italy)

28 January 2019 17	Al-Nassr	4–0	Ohod	Al Majma'ah
18:20	Hamdallah 16', (yellow card) 90+1'; Al-Ghanam 45+1'; Al-Shehri 71'; Khamis 78'	Report	Hawsawi (yellow card) 38'	Stadium: King Salman Sport City Stadium; Attendance: 3,039; Referee: Svein Oddvar Moen (Norway)

3 February 2019 18	Ohod	2–1	Al-Ettifaq	Medina
20:15	Fouzair 20', (yellow card) 67'; Majrashi (red card) 35'; Medjani 45+1'; Mohamad (yellow card) 53'	Report	Arias (yellow card) 38'; Al-Sonain (yellow card) 41'; Akaïchi 51'; Alemán (red card) 90+4'	Stadium: Prince Mohammed bin Abdul Aziz Stadium; Attendance: 2,011; Referee: Turki Al-Khudair

7 February 2019 19	Ohod	4–1	Al-Faisaly	Medina
18:50	Attiyah 2'; Hawsawi (yellow card) 19'; Otaif 45+3', (yellow card) 88'; Gomaa 47'; Al-Dhaw (yellow card) 51'; Teikeu (yellow card) 66', (goal) 76'	Report	Al-Shamrani 45+5'; Mendash (yellow card) 85'	Stadium: Prince Mohammed bin Abdul Aziz Stadium; Attendance: 2,189; Referee: Shukri Al-Hanfoush

14 February 2019 20	Al-Taawoun	4–0	Ohod	Buraidah
18:35	Adam 14', 30', 55'; Tawamba 86' (pen.)	Report	Al-Asmari (yellow card) 45+3'; Hamad (yellow card) 90+3'	Stadium: King Abdullah Sport City Stadium; Attendance: 2,474; Referee: Khaled Al-Teris

22 February 2019 21	Al-Wehda	4–1	Ohod	Mecca
20:25	Jebali 29'; Anselmo (yellow card) 39'; Marcos Guilherme 41', 74'; Abdu Jaber 67'	Report	Gomaa (yellow card) 35'; Attiyah (yellow card) 45'; Al-Asmari 60'; Al-Dhaw (yellow card) 90+4'	Stadium: King Abdul Aziz Stadium; Attendance: 2,001; Referee: Jochem Kamphuis (Netherlands)

28 February 2019 22	Ohod	0–0	Al-Fateh	Medina
19:05	Haj Mohamad (yellow card) 58'; Medjani (yellow card) 78'; Ashoor (yellow card) 83'; O. Mohammed (yellow card) 84'	Report	Al-Dossari (yellow card) 22' (yellow-red card) 72'; Al-Fuhaid (yellow card) 69'; Korzun (yellow card) 69'	Stadium: Prince Mohammed bin Abdul Aziz Stadium; Attendance: 2,021; Referee: Ovidiu Hațegan (Romania)

9 March 2019 23	Al-Hazem	2–2	Ohod	Ar Rass
16:00	Salomão 29'; Asselah (yellow card) 60'; Igboananike 72'; Rodolfo (yellow card) 90+2'	Report	Majrashi (yellow card) 41'; Medjani 58' (pen.), 84'; Al-Maghrebi (yellow card) 75'	Stadium: Al-Hazem Club Stadium; Attendance: 1,053; Referee: Matthew Conger (New Zealand)

23 March 2019 24	Al-Hilal	0–0	Ohod	Riyadh
20:05	Bahebri (yellow card) 53'; Al-Breik (yellow card) 90+4'	Report	Majrashi (yellow card) 34'; Teikeu (yellow card) 45'; Al-Owaishir (yellow card) 82'; Al-Dhaw (yellow card) 87'	Stadium: King Saud University Stadium; Attendance: 20,925; Referee: Ovidiu Hațegan (Romania)

30 March 2019 25	Ohod	1–2	Al-Shabab	Medina
19:15	Majed Hazazi 21', (red card) 86'; Hamad (yellow card) 45+2'; Belaïd (yellow card) 77'; Mohammed (yellow card) 81'; Fouzair (yellow card) 90+2'	Report	Sebá 18'; Găman (yellow card) 28'; Trawally (yellow card) 34', (goal) 36'; Al-Enezi (yellow card) 90+3'; Ben Mustapha (yellow card) 90+11'	Stadium: Prince Mohammed bin Abdul Aziz Stadium; Attendance: 5,799; Referee: Viktor Kassai (Hungary)

5 April 2019 26	Al-Qadsiah	4–2	Ohod	Khobar
18:35	Bismark 28', 45+4'; Hazazi (yellow card) 32'; Élton (yellow card) 39'; Camara 48'; Williams 52'	Report	Maâzou 9'; Otaif 70'; Al-Dhaw (yellow card) 75'; Aashor (red card) 90+3'	Stadium: Prince Saud bin Jalawi Stadium; Attendance: 420; Referee: Artur Soares Dias (Portugal)

12 April 2019 27	Ohod	1–3	Al-Fayha	Medina
19:20	Hamad (yellow card) 7'; Fouzair 45' (pen.); Teikeu (yellow card) 84'; Attiyah (yellow card) 86'	Report	Asprilla 1', 39'; Al-Muziel (yellow card) 17'; Al-Barakah 27'; Al-Sobhi (yellow card) 45+3'; Buhimed (yellow card) 82'	Stadium: Prince Mohammed bin Abdul Aziz Stadium; Attendance: 1,680; Referee: João Pinheiro (Portugal)

19 April 2019 28	Al-Raed	5–1	Ohod	Buraidah
20:30	Mboyo 5'; Al-Shehri 28', 89' (pen.), 90+7', (yellow card) 82'; Al-Shamekh 40' (pen.)	Report	Majrashi 50'; Mohammed (yellow card) 53'; Attiyah (yellow card) 85'	Stadium: King Abdullah Sport City Stadium; Attendance: 1,974; Referee: João Capela (Portugal)

11 May 2019 29	Al-Batin	0–1	Ohod	Hafar al-Batin
22:30	Ounalli (yellow card) 37'	Report	Teikeu (yellow card) 35'; Majrashi 40'; Abderrazzak (yellow card) 54'	Stadium: Al-Batin Club Stadium; Attendance: 2,967; Referee: Kim Sang-woo (South Korea)

16 May 2019 30	Ohod	1–0	Al-Ittihad	Medina
22:30	Majrashi 9'; Al-Dhaw (yellow card) 78'; Mohamad (yellow card) 82'	Report	Sanogo (yellow card) 61'; Reeman (yellow card) 67'	Stadium: Prince Mohammed bin Abdul Aziz Stadium; Attendance: 5,000; Referee: Matthew Conger (New Zealand)

=== King Cup ===
All times are local, AST (UTC+3).

5 January 2019 Round of 64	Ohod	2–0	Al-Sharq	Medina
18:30	Al-Asmari 18'; Eisa 73'	Report		Stadium: Prince Mohammed bin Abdul Aziz Stadium; Referee: Mohammed Al-Buraidi

15 January 2019 Round of 32	Al-Taqadom	2–0	Ohod	Buraidah
15:35	Al-Sibiyani 7'; Al-Hadhriti 54' (pen.); Al-Johaim (yellow card) 89'	Report	Al-Dhaw (yellow card) 45'; Hazzazi (yellow card) 53'; Medjani (yellow card) 78'	Stadium: King Abdullah Sport City Stadium; Referee: Abdullah Al-Awidan

== Statistics ==
=== Squad statistics ===
Last updated on 16 May 2019.

No.	Pos	Nat	Player	Total		Pro League		King Cup	
No.	Pos	Nat	Player	Apps	Goals	Apps	Goals	Apps	Goals
Goalkeepers
22	GK	(Saudi Arabia)	Abdoh Besisi	5	0	2+1	0	2	0
33	GK	(Saudi Arabia)	Hossam Abdulmajeed	0	0	0	0	0	0
66	GK	(Saudi Arabia)	Khalid Sharahili	4	0	4	0	0	0
77	GK	(Saudi Arabia)	Abdullah Al-Owaishir	6	0	6	0	0	0
Defenders
4	DF	(Cameroon)	Adolphe Teikeu	29	2	27	2	1+1	0
5	DF	(Saudi Arabia)	Omar Mohammed	20	0	19	0	1	0
12	DF	(Algeria)	Carl Medjani	16	3	14+1	3	1	0
17	DF	(Saudi Arabia)	Sami Kassar	23	1	17+4	1	2	0
39	DF	(Tunisia)	Ghazi Abderrazzak	13	0	13	0	0	0
45	DF	(Saudi Arabia)	Zeyad Al-Hunayti	5	0	2+2	0	1	0
50	DF	(Saudi Arabia)	Osama Aashor	11	0	7+4	0	0	0
75	DF	(Tunisia)	Aymen Belaïd	8	0	8	0	0	0
89	DF	(Saudi Arabia)	Majed Hazazi	15	1	13	1	2	0
Midfielders
8	MF	(Sudan)	Mohammed Al-Dhaw	22	1	13+8	1	1	0
11	MF	(Saudi Arabia)	Rakan Al-Hafdhi	9	0	4+5	0	0	0
13	MF	(Saudi Arabia)	Moataz Tombakti	1	0	1	0	0	0
14	MF	(Syria)	Tamer Haj Mohamad	24	0	24	0	0	0
19	MF	(Saudi Arabia)	Abdullah Majrashi	3	0	3	0	0	0
21	MF	(Saudi Arabia)	Mohammed Attiyah	24	1	18+4	1	2	0
25	MF	(Saudi Arabia)	Ahmed Saleh	1	0	0+1	0	0	0
27	MF	(Saudi Arabia)	Fahad Al-Rashidi	3	0	0+3	0	0	0
29	MF	(Saudi Arabia)	Fahad Hamad	12	0	4+6	0	2	0
30	MF	(Morocco)	Mohamed Fouzair	9	2	8+1	2	0	0
40	MF	(Saudi Arabia)	Ali Al-Asmari	23	2	8+13	1	2	1
80	MF	(Saudi Arabia)	Nawaf Mashea	1	0	0+1	0	0	0
Forwards
15	FW	(Saudi Arabia)	Saqer Otaif	8	3	1+6	3	1	0
18	FW	(Saudi Arabia)	Mohammed Majrashi	12	3	8+3	3	1	0
55	FW	(Niger)	Moussa Maâzou	4	1	3+1	1	0	0
71	FW	(Saudi Arabia)	Ismael Al-Maghrebi	7	0	3+4	0	0	0
Players sent out on loan this season
16	MF	(Saudi Arabia)	Abdullah Al-Sohaymi	0	0	0	0	0	0
32	DF	(Saudi Arabia)	Abdullah Al-Rashidi	0	0	0	0	0	0
Player who made an appearance this season but have left the club
1	GK	(Morocco)	Zouhair Laaroubi	16	0	16	0	0	0
3	DF	(Bosnia and Herzegovina)	Enes Šipović	11	0	11	0	0	0
6	MF	(Ghana)	Carlos Ohene	14	0	14	0	0	0
7	DF	(Brazil)	Apodi	15	0	14	0	1	0
9	FW	(Saudi Arabia)	Naif Hazazi	3	0	1+2	0	0	0
10	FW	(Saudi Arabia)	Islam Seraj	11	0	8+3	0	0	0
20	FW	(Egypt)	Ahmed Gomaa	6	1	6	1	0	0
23	FW	(Burkina Faso)	Haron Eisa	10	1	1+7	0	1+1	1
24	DF	(Saudi Arabia)	Hussein Abdulghani	11	1	11	1	0	0
34	FW	(Saudi Arabia)	Raed Al-Ghamdi	1	0	1	0	0	0
35	GK	(Uzbekistan)	Ignatiy Nesterov	2	0	2	0	0	0
70	MF	(Saudi Arabia)	Sumayhan Al-Nabit	0	0	0	0	0	0
74	MF	(Egypt)	Moamen Zakaria	0	0	0	0	0	0
88	MF	(Saudi Arabia)	Talal Majrashi	0	0	0	0	0	0
90	MF	(Brazil)	Bruno Michel	13	0	4+7	0	1+1	0
99	FW	(Brazil)	Ribamar	11	3	11	3	0	0

=== Goalscorers ===
Rank	No.	Pos	Nat	Name	Pro League	King Cup	Total
1	12	DF	(Algeria)	Carl Medjani	3	0	3
1	15	FW	(Saudi Arabia)	Saqer Otaif	3	0	3
1	18	FW	(Saudi Arabia)	Mohammed Majrashi	3	0	3
1	99	FW	(Brazil)	Ribamar	3	0	3
5	4	DF	(Cameroon)	Adolphe Teikeu	2	0	2
5	30	MF	(Morocco)	Mohamed Fouzair	2	0	2
5	40	MF	(Saudi Arabia)	Ali Al-Asmari	1	1	2
8	8	MF	(Sudan)	Mohammed Al-Dhaw	1	0	1
8	17	DF	(Saudi Arabia)	Sami Kassar	1	0	1
8	20	FW	(Egypt)	Ahmed Gomaa	1	0	1
8	21	MF	(Saudi Arabia)	Mohammed Attiyah	1	0	1
8	23	FW	(Burkina Faso)	Haron Eisa	0	1	1
8	24	DF	(Saudi Arabia)	Hussein Abdulghani	1	0	1
8	55	FW	(Niger)	Moussa Maâzou	1	0	1
8	89	DF	(Saudi Arabia)	Majed Hazazi	1	0	1
Own goal					1	0	0
Total					25	2	27

Last Updated: 16 May 2019

=== Assists ===
Rank	No.	Pos	Nat	Name	Pro League	King Cup	Total
1	21	MF	(Saudi Arabia)	Mohammed Attiyah	3	0	3
2	18	FW	(Saudi Arabia)	Mohammed Majrashi	2	0	2
3	6	MF	(Ghana)	Carlos Ohene	1	0	1
3	7	DF	(Brazil)	Apodi	1	0	1
3	8	MF	(Sudan)	Mohammed Al-Dhaw	1	0	1
3	12	DF	(Algeria)	Carl Medjani	1	0	1
3	24	DF	(Saudi Arabia)	Hussein Abdulghani	1	0	1
3	27	MF	(Saudi Arabia)	Fahad Al-Rashidi	1	0	1
3	30	MF	(Morocco)	Mohamed Fouzair	1	0	1
3	89	DF	(Saudi Arabia)	Majed Hazazi	1	0	1
Total					13	0	13

Last Updated: 16 May 2019

=== Clean sheets ===
Rank	No.	Pos	Nat	Name	Pro League	King Cup	Total
1	1	GK	(Morocco)	Zouhair Laaroubi	2	0	2
1	66	GK	(Saudi Arabia)	Khalid Sharahili	2	0	2
1	77	GK	(Saudi Arabia)	Abdullah Al-Owaishir	2	0	2
4	22	GK	(Saudi Arabia)	Abdoh Besisi	0	1	1
Total					6	1	7

Last Updated: 16 May 2019
