= 2018–19 Al-Batin F.C. season =

Al-Batin
2018–19 season
- President: Nasser Al-Huwaidi
- Manager: Franky Vercauteren (until 1 November); Yousef Al-Ghadeer (from 10 November until 17 February); Ciprian Panait (from 17 February)
- Stadium: Al-Batin Club Stadium
- SPL: 15th (relegated)
- King Cup: Quarter-finals (knocked out by Al-Ittihad)
- Top goalscorer: League: Jhonnattann; Crysan (6); All: Jhonnattann (9)
- Highest home attendance: 6,000 vs Al-Nassr (19 October 2018); 6,000 vs Al-Ittihad (14 December 2018); 6,000 vs Al-Hilal (8 February 2019)
- Lowest home attendance: 1,436 vs Al-Ettifaq (11 January 2019)
- Average home league attendance: 3,476
Home colours	Away colours	Third colours
- All statistics correct as of 16 May 2019.

The 2018–19 season was Al-Batin's third consecutive season in Pro League and their 40th year in existence. This season Al-Batin participated in the Pro League and King Cup.

The season covers the period from 1 July 2018 to 30 June 2019.

== Players ==
=== Squad information ===
As of 4 February 2019

Note: Flags indicate national team as defined under FIFA eligibility rules; some limited exceptions apply. Players may hold more than one non-FIFA nationality.

No.	Pos.	Nation	Player
1	GK	KSA	Khowailed Ayyadah
3	DF	KSA	Bander Nasser
4	DF	KSA	Bader Al-Nakhli
5	MF	BRA	Baraka
6	FW	GUI	Ismaël Bangoura (on loan from Al-Raed)
7	DF	KSA	Mohanna Waqes (captain)
10	MF	KSA	Jadaan Mohanna
12	MF	KSA	Majed Kanabah
13	DF	KSA	Anas Zabani (on loan from Al-Hilal)
15	MF	KSA	Abdulmajeed Obaid
17	MF	KSA	Raed Al-Ghamdi
19	FW	KSA	Ramzi Solan (on loan from Al-Faisaly)
20	MF	KSA	Abdulaziz Majrashi (on loan from Al-Ettifaq)
21	GK	KSA	Mohammed Al Rubaie (on loan from Al-Ahli)
23	FW	BRA	Crysan (on loan from Athletico-PR)
25	DF	KSA	Sultan Masrahi

No.	Pos.	Nation	Player
26	GK	KSA	Mazyad Freeh
27	MF	BRA	Jhonnattann (on loan from Al-Taawoun)
29	MF	TUN	Zied Ounalli (on loan from CA Bizertin)
31	DF	KSA	Sultan Ghunaiman
32	FW	KSA	Fahad Al-Johani (on loan from Al-Qadsiah)
33	DF	KSA	Sultan Dawood
39	MF	AUS	Osama Malik
50	GK	KSA	Mutlaq Eid
51	FW	KSA	Mohammed Al-Dhefiri
55	DF	KSA	Muteb Mansour
66	MF	KSA	Waleed Khaled
77	DF	KSA	Abdulmohsen Al-Subhi
80	FW	KSA	Yousef Al-Mozairib
83	GK	BRA	Adriano Facchini
90	DF	BRA	Lucas Tagliapietra
98	FW	KSA	Muteb Al-Hammad (on loan from Al-Nassr)

== Transfers ==
=== In ===
Date	Pos.	Name	Previous club	Fee	Source
30 May 2018	DF	(Saudi Arabia) Meshal Khalaf	(Saudi Arabia) Al-Tai	End of loan	
30 May 2018	FW	(Saudi Arabia) Hassan Sharahili	(Saudi Arabia) Damac	End of loan	
3 June 2018	DF	(Egypt) Abdallah Bakry	(Egypt) Smouha	Undisclosed	
13 June 2018	MF	(Colombia) Misael Riascos	(Colombia) Boyacá Chicó	€430,000	
11 July 2018	DF	(Brazil) João Gabriel	(Brazil) São Bento	Free	
11 July 2018	DF	(Brazil) Lucas Tagliapietra	(Ecuador) LDU	€900,000	
11 July 2018	MF	(Brazil) Baraka	(Brazil) Guarani	Free	
13 July 2018	MF	(Colombia) Johan Arango	(Colombia) Santa Fe	Free	
16 July 2018	GK	(Brazil) Adriano Facchini	(Portugal) Aves	Undisclosed	
15 August 2018	DF	(Saudi Arabia) Abdulmohsen Al-Subhi	(Saudi Arabia) Al-Ahli	Free	
21 August 2018	FW	(Morocco) Aziz Bouhaddouz	(Germany) St. Pauli	€750,000	
25 September 2018	FW	(Saudi Arabia) Raed Al-Ghamdi	(Saudi Arabia) Ohod	Free	
20 January 2019	DF	(Saudi Arabia) Bader Al-Nakhli	(Saudi Arabia) Al-Ittihad	Free	
29 January 2019	MF	(Australia) Osama Malik	(Australia) Melbourne City	Free	

=== Loans in ===
Date	Pos.	Name	Parent club	End date	Source
15 July 2018	MF	(Saudi Arabia) Abdulrahman Al-Dhefiri	(Saudi Arabia) Al-Nassr	4 February 2019	
16 July 2018	FW	(Saudi Arabia) Fahad Al-Johani	(Saudi Arabia) Al-Qadsiah	End of season	
30 July 2018	FW	(Saudi Arabia) Muteb Al-Hammad	(Saudi Arabia) Al-Nassr	End of season	
2 August 2018	GK	(Saudi Arabia) Mohammed Al Rubaie	(Saudi Arabia) Al-Ahli	End of season	
15 August 2018	DF	(Saudi Arabia) Anas Zabani	(Saudi Arabia) Al-Hilal	End of season	
22 August 2018	FW	(Brazil) Crysan	(Brazil) Atlético Paranaense	End of season	
1 January 2019	MF	(Saudi Arabia) Abdulaziz Majrashi	(Saudi Arabia) Al-Ettifaq	End of season	
3 January 2019	MF	(Brazil) Jhonnattann	(Saudi Arabia) Al-Taawoun	End of season	
8 January 2019	FW	(Saudi Arabia) Ramzi Solan	(Saudi Arabia) Al-Faisaly	End of season	
10 January 2019	FW	(Tunisia) Zied Ounalli	(Tunisia) Bizertin	End of season	
19 January 2019	FW	(Guinea) Ismaël Bangoura	(Saudi Arabia) Al-Raed	End of season	

=== Out ===
Date	Pos.	Name	New club	Fee	Source
30 May 2018	DF	(Saudi Arabia) Hussein Halawani	(Saudi Arabia) Al-Ittihad	End of loan	
30 May 2018	DF	(Nigeria) Abdulshakour Hosawi	(Saudi Arabia) Hajer	End of loan	
30 May 2018	MF	(Saudi Arabia) Waleed Al-Enezi	(Saudi Arabia) Al-Shabab	End of loan	
30 May 2018	MF	(Saudi Arabia) Abdulmalek Al-Shammeri	(Saudi Arabia) Al-Shabab	End of loan	
31 May 2018	DF	(Brazil) Pitty	(Saudi Arabia) Al-Tai	Free	
4 June 2018	FW	(Brazil) Jorge Silva	(United Arab Emirates) Al-Fujairah	Free	
7 June 2018	FW	(Brazil) Guilherme Schettine	(United Arab Emirates) Hatta	Free	
13 June 2018	MF	(Brazil) Jhonnattann	(Saudi Arabia) Al-Taawoun	Free	
20 June 2018	MF	(Saudi Arabia) Naif Eisa	Retired		
27 June 2018	DF	(Egypt) Abdallah Bakry	(Egypt) Pyramids	Undisclosed	
30 June 2018	MF	(Saudi Arabia) Abdullah Al-Jouei	(Portugal) Marítimo	Free	
9 July 2018	MF	(Saudi Arabia) Mosaab Al-Otaibi	Released		
9 July 2018	MF	(Saudi Arabia) Khaled Dakheel	Released		
10 July 2018	DF	(Saudi Arabia) Jamal Al-Dhefiri	(Saudi Arabia) Al-Qaisumah	Free	
23 July 2018	MF	(Saudi Arabia) Maan Khodari	(Saudi Arabia) Al-Kawkab	Free	
24 July 2018	GK	(Tunisia) Aymen Mathlouthi	(Tunisia) Club Africain	Free	
25 July 2018	GK	(Saudi Arabia) Nasser Al-Mehaini	(Saudi Arabia) Al-Kawkab	Free	
30 July 2018	MF	(Mali) Ousmane Diabaté	(Saudi Arabia) Jeddah	Free	
12 August 2018	MF	(Brazil) Tinga	(Oman) Saham	Free	
25 August 2018	DF	(Saudi Arabia) Meshal Khalaf	(Saudi Arabia) Al-Jandal	Free	
26 August 2018	FW	(Saudi Arabia) Sahow Metlaq	(Saudi Arabia) Al-Qaisumah	Free	
29 December 2018	MF	(Colombia) Johan Arango	(Colombia) Santa Fe	Free	
3 January 2019	DF	(Brazil) João Gabriel	(Mexico) Tampico Madero	Undisclosed	

=== Loans out ===
Date	Pos.	Name	Subsequent club	End date	Source
1 January 2019	FW	(Saudi Arabia) Hassan Sharahili	(Saudi Arabia) Damac	End of season	

== Pre-season friendlies ==
20 July 2018 Friendly	Al-Taawoun (Saudi Arabia)	1–0	(Saudi Arabia) Al-Batin	Buraidah, Saudi Arabia
19:45 AST	Tawamba 26'			Stadium: Al-Taawoun Club Stadium

25 July 2018 Friendly	Al-Batin (Saudi Arabia)	2–0	(Saudi Arabia) Al-Tai	Buraidah, Saudi Arabia
19:30 AST	Al-Johani 54'; Al-Dhefiri 57'			Stadium: Al-Taawoun Club Stadium

10 August 2018 Friendly	Roda JC (Netherlands)	0–1	(Saudi Arabia) Al-Batin	Kerkrade, Netherlands
19:00 CEST		Report	Al-Johani 8'	Stadium: Parkstad Limburg Stadion; Attendance: 2,200

14 August 2018 Friendly	Lens B (France)	4–3	(Saudi Arabia) Al-Batin	Vimy, France
17:00 CEST	Lemaire,, Maes	Report	Mohanna 15' (pen.); Al-Mozairib 47'; Al-Dhefiri 65'	Stadium: Stade De La Mine

== Competitions ==
=== Overall ===
Competition	Started round	Current position / round	Final position / round	First match	Last match
Pro League	—	—	15th	31 August 2018	16 May 2019
King Cup	Round of 64	—	Quarter-finals	1 January 2019	1 April 2019

Last Updated: 16 May 2019

=== Pro League ===
==== League table ====
Pos	Team	Pld	W	D	L	GF	GA	GD	Pts	Qualification or relegation
12	Al-Fayha	30	9	5	16	36	52	−16	32	
13	Al-Hazem (O)	30	7	10	13	33	50	−17	31	Qualification for Relegation play-offs
14	Al-Qadsiah (R)	30	8	4	18	34	51	−17	28	Relegation to Prince Mohammad bin Salman League
15	Al-Batin (R)	30	7	4	19	29	53	−24	25	Relegation to Prince Mohammad bin Salman League
16	Ohod (R)	30	5	6	19	25	62	−37	21	Relegation to Prince Mohammad bin Salman League

Source: spl.com
Rules for classification: 1) Points; 2) Head-to-head points; 3) Head-to-head goal difference; 4) Total goal difference; 5) Total goals scored; 6) Play-off (only for deciding champion, relegation and AFC competitions participation).
(O) Play-off winners; (R) Relegated

==== Results summary ====
Overall								Home						Away					
Pld	W	D	L	GF	GA	GD	Pts	W	D	L	GF	GA	GD	W	D	L	GF	GA	GD
30	7	4	19	29	53	−24	25	4	3	8	15	24	−9	3	1	11	14	29	−15

Last updated: 16 May 2019.
Source: Competitive matches

==== Results by round ====
Round	1	2	3	4	5	6	7	8	9	10	11	12	13	14	15	16	17	18	19	20	21	22	23	24	25	26	27	28	29	30
Ground	A	A	A	A	A	H	H	H	H	A	H	H	H	A	H	H	H	H	H	A	A	H	A	A	A	A	H	A	H	A
Result	D	L	L	L	W	L	L	W	D	L	L	W	L	L	W	D	W	L	L	L	L	D	W	L	L	L	L	W	L	L
Position	5	11	12	14	13	13	14	13	13	14	14	14	14	14	14	14	12	13	13	13	13	14	13	14	15	15	15	15	15	15

Updated to match(es) played on 16 May 2019. Source: Competitive matches
A = Away; H = Home; W = Win; D = Draw; L = Loss

==== Matches ====
All times are local, AST (UTC+3).

Win Draw Loss Postponed

31 August 2018 1	Al-Faisaly	2–2	Al-Batin	Al Majma'ah
19:00	Rogerinho 29'; Majrashi 41'; Hyland (yellow card) 85'	Report	Bouhaddouz 56'; Arango (yellow card) 77', (goal) 90+5'; Crysan (yellow card) 90'; Nasser (yellow card) 90+2'	Stadium: King Salman Sport City Stadium; Attendance: 2,754; Referee: Milorad Mažić (Serbia)

13 September 2018 2	Al-Ettifaq	3–2	Al-Batin	Dammam
18:25	Guanca 43'; Al-Habib (yellow card) 45+2'; El Sayed (yellow card) 47'; Al-Sonain (yellow card) 53'; Al-Habib 68'; Ben Youssef 81'	Report	Kanabah (yellow card) 59'; Bouhaddouz 74'; Riascos (yellow card) 79'; Sharahili 90+4'	Stadium: Prince Mohamed bin Fahd Stadium; Attendance: 1,876; Referee: Mark Clattenburg (England)

20 September 2018 3	Al-Hilal	3–1	Al-Batin	Riyadh
20:45	Al-Faraj (yellow card) 27'; Al-Bulaihi 32'; Gomis 41', 45+4'	Report	Crysan 49'	Stadium: King Saud University Stadium; Attendance: 22,078; Referee: Damir Skomina (Slovenia)

29 September 2018 4	Al-Ahli	2–0	Al-Batin	Jeddah
20:35	Said 15', (yellow card) 34'; Al-Mousa 53'	Report		Stadium: King Abdullah Sports City; Attendance: 13,732; Referee: Ravshan Irmatov (Uzbekistan)

5 October 2018 5	Ohod	0–1	Al-Batin	Medina
18:45	Ribamar (yellow card) 9'; Abdulghani (yellow card) 57'; Ohene (yellow card) 80'	Report	João Gabriel (yellow card) 45+2'; Arango (yellow card) 59'; Al-Johani 90+3'	Stadium: Prince Mohammed bin Abdul Aziz Stadium; Attendance: 4,704; Referee: Tomasz Musiał (Poland)

19 October 2018 6	Al-Batin	0–2	Al-Nassr	Hafar al-Batin
18:10		Report	Lucas 4' (o.g.); Hamdallah 63'; Khamis (yellow card) 90+1'	Stadium: Al-Batin Club Stadium; Attendance: 6,000; Referee: Szymon Marciniak (Poland)

26 October 2018 7	Al-Batin	0–5	Al-Taawoun	Hafar al-Batin
18:10	Lucas (red card) 70'; Arango (yellow card) 74'	Report	Amissi 27'; Machado 37', (yellow card) 74'; Héldon (yellow card) 46'; Tawamba 53'; Adam 78'; Sandro Manoel (yellow card) 82'; Ghunaiman 90+3' (o.g.)	Stadium: Al-Batin Club Stadium; Attendance: 4,164; Referee: Fedayi San (Switzerland)

1 November 2018 8	Al-Batin	1–0	Al-Hazem	Hafar al-Batin
18:00	Al-Ghamdi 67'; Ghunaiman (yellow card) 76'; Al-Sobhi (yellow card) 90+4'; Al-Mozairib (yellow card) 90+7'	Report	Muralha (yellow card) 13'; Al-Barakah (yellow card) 90'; Rodolfo (yellow card) 90+5'	Stadium: Al-Batin Club Stadium; Referee: Bartosz Frankowski (Poland)

8 November 2018 9	Al-Batin	2–2	Al-Fateh	Hafar al-Batin
17:45	Waqes (yellow card) 40'; Al-Johani 55'; Baraka (yellow card) 76'; Hamzah 82' (o.g.); Arango (yellow card) 89'	Report	Naâmani (yellow card) 36'; Bangoura (yellow card) 39', (goal) 45'; Hamzi 45+2'	Stadium: Al-Batin Club Stadium; Attendance: 2,933; Referee: Matthew Conger (New Zealand)

22 November 2018 10	Al-Wehda	1–0	Al-Batin	Mecca
18:20	Al-Jassim 22'; Renato Chaves (yellow card) 76'; Al-Malki (yellow card) 85'; Awad (yellow card) 86'	Report	Kanabah (yellow card) 74'	Stadium: King Abdul Aziz Stadium; Attendance: 2,089; Referee: Svein Oddvar Moen (Norway)

1 December 2018 11	Al-Batin	1–3	Al-Raed	Hafar al-Batin
17:40	Mohanna (yellow card) 42', (goal) 67'; Al-Ghamdi (yellow card) 67'; Sharahili (yellow card) 90+3'	Report	Hasani 9', 25'; Atwa (yellow card) 37'; Al-Amri (yellow card) 85'; Al-Shehri 87'	Stadium: Al-Batin Club Stadium; Attendance: 3,021; Referee: Kevin Blom (Netherlands)

6 December 2018 12	Al-Batin	1–0	Al-Fayha	Hafar al-Batin
15:00	Al-Johani (yellow card) 41', (goal) 50'; Waqes (yellow card) 67'; Facchini (yellow card) 69'; Al-Hammad (yellow card) 90+5'	Report	Tziolis (yellow card) 29'; Buhimed (yellow card) 62'; Al-Khaibari (yellow card) 82'	Stadium: Al-Batin Club Stadium; Attendance: 2,696; Referee: Simon Lee Evans (Wales)

14 December 2018 13	Al-Batin	1–3	Al-Ittihad	Hafar al-Batin
17:45	Al-Johani (yellow card) 68'; Al-Ghamdi 90+3'	Report	Al-Ghamdi 5', (yellow card) 34'; Al-Daheem (yellow card) 30'; Al-Sumairi (yellow card) 43'; Romarinho 53'; Al-Muwallad 72'	Stadium: Al-Batin Club Stadium; Attendance: 6,000; Referee: Alan Kelly (Republic of Ireland)

21 December 2018 14	Al-Shabab	4–0	Al-Batin	Riyadh
15:10	Arthur 20', 36'; Budescu 22', 59'; Ghazi (yellow card) 60'; Al-Khaibari (yellow card) 85'	Report		Stadium: Prince Faisal bin Fahd Stadium; Attendance: 1,073; Referee: Mark Clattenburg (England)

27 December 2018 15	Al-Batin	2–0	Al-Qadsiah	Hafar al-Batin
17:45	Waqes (yellow card) 11'; Nasser (yellow card) 43'; Crysan 65', 90+3' (pen.)	Report	Al-Zain (yellow card) 53'; Williams (yellow card) 71'; Sharahili (yellow card) 73'	Stadium: Al-Batin Club Stadium; Attendance: 2,124; Referee: Viktor Kassai (Hungary)

11 January 2019 16	Al-Batin	0–0	Al-Ettifaq	Hafar al-Batin
15:30	Baraka (yellow card) 31'; Al-Hammad (yellow card) 81'; Masrahi (yellow card) 86'; Jhonnattann (yellow card) 88'	Report	Al-Khaibari (yellow card) 18'; Kiss (yellow card) 45+2'; Ben Youssef (yellow card) 47'; Alemán (yellow card) 76'; M'Bolhi (yellow card) 83'	Stadium: Al-Batin Club Stadium; Attendance: 1,436; Referee: Pavel Královec (Czech Republic)

28 January 2019 17	Al-Batin	2–0	Al-Faisaly	Hafar al-Batin
15:30	Crysan (yellow card) 75', (goal) 90+1' (pen.); Waqes (yellow card) 78'; Al-Ghamdi 85'	Report	Abousaban (yellow card) 83'; Al-Shamrani (red card) 90+5'	Stadium: Al-Batin Club Stadium; Attendance: 1,873; Referee: Khaled Al-Teris

2 February 2019 18	Al-Batin	1–2	Al-Ahli	Hafar al-Batin
18:15	Jhonnattann 41'; Masrahi (yellow card) 78'	Report	Al-Moasher 30'; Asiri 54'	Stadium: Al-Batin Club Stadium; Attendance: 3,023; Referee: Svein Oddvar Moen (Norway)

8 February 2019 19	Al-Batin	2–3	Al-Hilal	Hafar al-Batin
20:15	Jhonnattann 25'; Ounalli (yellow card) 50', (goal) 85'; Kanabah (yellow card) 75'; Nasser (yellow card) 90+5'; Ghunaiman (yellow card) 90+5'; Facchini (yellow card) 90+6'	Report	Carrillo 18'; Kanno 72'; Carlos Eduardo (red card) 87'; Gomis 90+3'	Stadium: Al-Batin Club Stadium; Attendance: 6,000; Referee: Kevin Blom (Netherlands)

13 February 2019 20	Al-Hazem	1–0	Al-Batin	Ar Rass
15:50	Tsiskaridze (yellow card) 33'; Al-Saiari 50'; Muralha (yellow card) 82'	Report		Stadium: Al-Hazem Club Stadium; Attendance: 2,900; Referee: Daniel Stefanski (Poland)

22 February 2019 21	Al-Taawoun	4–1	Al-Batin	Buraidah
15:55	Adam 19', 50'; Amissi (yellow card) 60'; Al-Absi (yellow card) 64'; Tawamba 70', 76'	Report	Waqes (yellow card) 32'; Jhonnattann (yellow card) 65', (goal) 79'; Nasser (yellow card) 75'; Al-Johani (yellow card) 89'	Stadium: King Abdullah Sport City Stadium; Attendance: 2,694; Referee: Ravshan Irmatov (Uzbekistan)

2 March 2019 22	Al-Batin	1–1	Al-Wehda	Hafar al-Batin
15:50	Majrashi (yellow card) 36'; Nasser (yellow card) 43'; Ounalli 80'; Bangoura (yellow card) 85'; Lucas (yellow card) 90+2'	Report	Bakshween (yellow card) 41'; Al-Qarni (yellow card) 77'; Jebali 90+3' (pen.)	Stadium: Al-Batin Club Stadium; Attendance: 2,918; Referee: Pawel Raczkowski (Poland)

9 March 2019 23	Al-Fateh	0–2	Al-Batin	Al-Hasa
15:40	Koval (yellow card) 30'; Oueslati (yellow card) 38'; Al-Fuhaid (yellow card) 43'	Report	Jhonnattann 19', 36'; Ounalli (yellow card) 45+2'; Kanabah (yellow card) 82'	Stadium: Prince Abdullah bin Jalawi Stadium; Attendance: 1,904; Referee: Pol van Boekel (Netherlands)

15 March 2019 24	Al-Raed	1–0	Al-Batin	Buraidah
16:00	Hammoudan 41'; Farhan (yellow card) 76'	Report	Masrahi (yellow card) 68'; Crysan (yellow card) 74'; Kanabah (yellow card) 87'	Stadium: King Abdullah Sport City Stadium; Attendance: 1,996; Referee: Paweł Gil (Poland)

28 March 2019 25	Al-Fayha	2–1	Al-Batin	Al Majma'ah
18:55	Al-Sobhi (yellow card) 40', (goal) 59'; Asprilla 86'; Al-Khaibari (yellow card) 90+4'; Al-Hajoj (yellow card) 90+5'	Report	Jhonnattann (yellow card) 54'; Ounalli 68'; Al-Sobhi (yellow card) 78' (yellow-red card) 90+3'	Stadium: King Salman Sport City Stadium; Attendance: 1,297; Referee: Viktor Kassai (Hungary)

5 April 2019 26	Al-Ittihad	4–1	Al-Batin	Jeddah
20:45	Al-Muwallad (yellow card) 8', (goal) 23' (pen.); Bajandouh (yellow card) 30'; Abdulhamid (yellow card) 44'; Romarinho 59' da Costa 62'; Sanogo 90+3'	Report	Ounalli (yellow card) 29'; Crysan (yellow card) 61'; Baraka 82'	Stadium: King Abdullah Sports City; Attendance: 23,897; Referee: Ovidiu Hațegan (Romania)

11 April 2019 27	Al-Batin	1–2	Al-Shabab	Hafar al-Batin
19:00	Al-Mozairib (yellow card) 11'; Kanabah (yellow card) 43'; Ghunaiman (yellow card) 45+2'; Crysan 90+4' (pen.)	Report	Sebá (yellow card) 7', (goal) 37', 65'; Al-Sulayhem (yellow card) 41'; Awaji (yellow card) 90+2'	Stadium: Al-Batin Club Stadium; Attendance: 3,126; Referee: Ravshan Irmatov (Uzbekistan)

19 April 2019 28	Al-Qadsiah	0–2	Al-Batin	Khobar
18:45	Bismark (yellow card) 34'; Al-Shoeil (yellow card) 46'	Report	Ounalli (yellow card) 24'; Mohanna (yellow card) 41'; Crysan 51' (pen.); Solan (yellow card) 58'; Jhonnattann 86'; Al-Mozairib (yellow card) 89'	Stadium: Prince Saud bin Jalawi Stadium; Attendance: 728; Referee: Deniz Aytekin (Germany)

11 May 2019 29	Al-Batin	0–1	Ohod	Hafar al-Batin
22:30	Ounalli (yellow card) 37'	Report	Teikeu (yellow card) 35'; Majrashi 40'; Abderrazzak (yellow card) 54'	Stadium: Al-Batin Club Stadium; Attendance: 2,967; Referee: Kim Sang-woo (South Korea)

16 May 2019 30	Al-Nassr	2–1	Al-Batin	Riyadh
22:30	Hamdallah 26' (pen.), 57', (yellow card) 27'; Al-Ghanam (yellow card) 36'	Report	Ghunaiman (yellow card) 25'; Lucas (yellow card) 25'; Jhonnattann (yellow card) 40'; Ounalli 53'	Stadium: King Fahd International Stadium; Attendance: 59,174; Referee: Ovidiu Hațegan (Romania)

=== King Cup ===
All times are local, AST (UTC+3).

1 January 2019 Round of 64	Al-Hejaz	1–2	Al-Batin	Al Bahah
15:45	Khalil 82'	Report	Crysan 65' (pen.); Mohsen 90'	Stadium: King Saud Sport City Stadium; Referee: Turki Hashlan

17 January 2019 Round of 32	Al-Shoulla	0–1	Al-Batin	Al-Kharj
15:25	Al-Dossari (yellow card) 43'	Report	Jhonnattann 58'	Stadium: Al-Shoulla Club Stadium; Referee: Abdullah Al-Nuhait

22 January 2019 Round of 16	Al-Batin	2–1 (a.e.t.)	Al-Raed	Hafar al-Batin
15:30	Jhonnattann 19'; Baraka (yellow card) 25'; Nasser (yellow card) 58'; Waqes (yellow card) 70'; Al-Ghamdi 108'	Report	Hasani 49'; Al-Farhan (yellow card) 70'; Al-Mogren (yellow card) 80'	Stadium: Al-Batin Club Stadium; Referee: Shukri Al-Hanfoush

1 April 2019 Quarter-finals	Al-Ittihad	4–3	Al-Batin	Jeddah
20:35	Al-Sumairi (yellow card) 36'; Prijović 44' (pen.), 58'; Sanogo (yellow card) 52'; Al-Harbi 69'; Romarinho 72'; Villanueva (yellow card) 82'	Report	Al-Mozairib 11'; Crysan 38'; Kanabah (yellow card) 74'; Jhonnattann 75', (yellow card) 82'; Al-Ghamdi (yellow card) 89'	Stadium: King Abdullah Sports City; Attendance: 15,214; Referee: Damir Skomina (Slovenia)

== Statistics ==
=== Squad statistics ===
Last updated on 16 May 2019.

No.	Pos	Nat	Player	Total		Pro League		King Cup	
No.	Pos	Nat	Player	Apps	Goals	Apps	Goals	Apps	Goals
Goalkeepers
1	GK	(Saudi Arabia)	Khowailed Ayyadah	0	0	0	0	0	0
21	GK	(Saudi Arabia)	Mohammed Al Rubaie	7	0	5+1	0	1	0
50	GK	(Saudi Arabia)	Mutlaq Eid	0	0	0	0	0	0
83	GK	(Brazil)	Adriano Facchini	28	0	25	0	3	0
Defenders
3	DF	(Saudi Arabia)	Bander Nasser	28	0	25	0	3	0
4	DF	(Saudi Arabia)	Bader Al-Nakhli	0	0	0	0	0	0
7	DF	(Saudi Arabia)	Mohanna Waqes	28	0	25+1	0	2	0
13	DF	(Saudi Arabia)	Anas Zabani	10	0	7+1	0	2	0
25	DF	(Saudi Arabia)	Sultan Masrahi	20	0	18	0	2	0
31	DF	(Saudi Arabia)	Sultan Ghunaiman	21	0	15+4	0	2	0
33	DF	(Saudi Arabia)	Sultan Dawood	2	0	0	0	2	0
55	DF	(Saudi Arabia)	Muteb Mansour	4	0	1+2	0	1	0
77	DF	(Saudi Arabia)	Abdulmohsen Al-Subhi	5	0	0+4	0	1	0
90	DF	(Brazil)	Lucas Tagliapietra	28	0	26	0	2	0
Midfielders
5	MF	(Brazil)	Baraka	32	1	28	1	4	0
10	MF	(Saudi Arabia)	Jadaan Mohanna	17	1	11+4	1	0+2	0
12	MF	(Saudi Arabia)	Majed Kanabah	25	0	18+5	0	2	0
15	MF	(Saudi Arabia)	Abdulmajeed Obaid	0	0	0	0	0	0
17	MF	(Saudi Arabia)	Raed Al-Ghamdi	15	4	11+2	3	1+1	1
20	MF	(Saudi Arabia)	Abdulaziz Majrashi	15	0	10+2	0	2+1	0
27	MF	(Brazil)	Jhonnattann	17	9	13+1	6	3	3
29	MF	(Tunisia)	Zied Ounalli	13	4	10+2	4	0+1	0
39	MF	(Australia)	Osama Malik	8	0	5+3	0	0	0
Forwards
6	FW	(Guinea)	Ismaël Bangoura	8	0	4+4	0	0	0
19	FW	(Saudi Arabia)	Ramzi Solan	8	0	4+4	0	0	0
23	FW	(Brazil)	Crysan	32	8	26+2	6	4	2
32	FW	(Saudi Arabia)	Fahad Al-Johani	23	3	12+8	3	2+1	0
51	FW	(Saudi Arabia)	Mohammed Al-Dhefiri	12	1	3+6	0	0+3	1
80	FW	(Saudi Arabia)	Yousef Al-Mozairib	15	1	3+9	0	2+1	1
98	FW	(Saudi Arabia)	Muteb Al-Hammad	9	0	0+6	0	1+2	0
Players sent out on loan this season
70	FW	(Saudi Arabia)	Hassan Sharahili	4	1	0+4	1	0	0
Player who made an appearance this season but have left the club
8	MF	(Saudi Arabia)	Abdulrahman Al-Dhefiri	4	0	1+2	0	1	0
9	FW	(Morocco)	Aziz Bouhaddouz	10	2	10	2	0	0
11	MF	(Colombia)	Misael Riascos	12	0	4+7	0	1	0
18	MF	(Colombia)	Johan Arango	11	1	8+3	1	0	0
22	DF	(Brazil)	João Gabriel	3	0	2+1	0	0	0

=== Goalscorers ===
Rank	No.	Pos	Nat	Name	Pro League	King Cup	Total
1	27	MF	(Brazil)	Jhonnattann	6	3	9
2	23	FW	(Brazil)	Crysan	6	2	8
3	17	MF	(Saudi Arabia)	Raed Al-Ghamdi	3	1	4
3	29	MF	(Tunisia)	Zied Ounalli	4	0	4
5	32	FW	(Saudi Arabia)	Fahad Al-Johani	3	0	3
6	9	FW	(Morocco)	Aziz Bouhaddouz	2	0	2
7	5	MF	(Brazil)	Baraka	1	0	1
7	10	MF	(Saudi Arabia)	Jadaan Mohanna	1	0	1
7	18	MF	(Colombia)	Johan Arango	1	0	1
7	51	FW	(Saudi Arabia)	Mohammed Al-Dhefiri	0	1	1
7	70	FW	(Saudi Arabia)	Hassan Sharahili	1	0	1
7	80	FW	(Saudi Arabia)	Yousef Al-Mozairib	0	1	1
Own goal					1	0	1
Total					29	8	37

Last Updated: 16 May 2019

=== Assists ===
Rank	No.	Pos	Nat	Name	Pro League	King Cup	Total
1	3	DF	(Saudi Arabia)	Bander Nasser	2	1	3
1	17	MF	(Saudi Arabia)	Raed Al-Ghamdi	3	0	3
1	23	FW	(Brazil)	Crysan	2	1	3
4	12	MF	(Saudi Arabia)	Majed Kanabah	2	0	2
4	20	MF	(Saudi Arabia)	Abdulaziz Majrashi	1	1	2
4	90	DF	(Brazil)	Lucas Tagliapietra	2	0	2
7	5	MF	(Brazil)	Baraka	1	0	1
7	9	FW	(Morocco)	Aziz Bouhaddouz	1	0	1
7	19	FW	(Saudi Arabia)	Ramzi Solan	1	0	1
7	32	FW	(Saudi Arabia)	Fahad Al-Johani	1	0	1
7	51	FW	(Saudi Arabia)	Mohammed Al-Dhefiri	1	0	1
Total					17	3	20

Last Updated: 16 May 2019

=== Clean sheets ===
Rank	No.	Pos	Nat	Name	Pro League	King Cup	Total
1	83	GK	(Brazil)	Adriano Facchini	7	1	8
2	21	GK	(Saudi Arabia)	Mohammed Al Rubaie	1	0	1
Total					8	1	9

Last Updated: 19 April 2019
