= 2018–19 Al-Raed FC season =

Al-Raed
2018–19 season
- President: Fahad Al-Motawa'a
- Manager: Besnik Hasi
- Stadium: King Abdullah Sport City Stadium
- SPL: 8th
- King Cup: Round of 16 (knocked out by Al-Batin)
- Top goalscorer: League: Saleh Al-Shehri (16); All: Saleh Al-Shehri (20)
- Highest home attendance: 11,735 vs Al-Nassr (4 April 2019)
- Lowest home attendance: 1,360 vs Al-Fayha (11 May 2019)
- Average home league attendance: 3,746
Home colours	Away colours	Third colours
- All statistics correct as of 16 May 2019.

The 2018–19 season was Al-Raed's eleventh consecutive season in Pro League and their 65th year in existence. This season Al-Raed participated in the Pro League and King Cup.

The season covers the period from 1 July 2018 to 30 June 2019.

== Players ==
=== Squad information ===
As of 4 February 2019

Note: Flags indicate national team as defined under FIFA eligibility rules; some limited exceptions apply. Players may hold more than one non-FIFA nationality.

No.	Pos.	Nation	Player
2	DF	KSA	Mohammed Al-Amri
4	DF	KSA	Yahya Al-Musalem
5	DF	KSA	Mohammed Al-Shoraimi
6	MF	KSA	Yahya Otain
7	MF	MKD	Ferhan Hasani
9	FW	KSA	Mazen Abo Shararah
11	FW	KSA	Saleh Al-Shehri
12	DF	KSA	Khalid Al-Ghamdi (on loan from Al-Nassr)
13	GK	NGA	Abdulbassit Hawsawi
14	MF	KSA	Abdullah Al-Mogren
15	MF	KSA	Mohanad Al-Shudukhi
16	MF	KSA	Abdullah Al-Sobeai
17	DF	KSA	Abdullah Al-Shamekh
19	DF	KSA	Abdullah Al-Fahad
20	MF	BRA	Kanu

No.	Pos.	Nation	Player
21	MF	KSA	Badr Al-Sulaitin
27	MF	MAR	Ahmed Hammoudan (on loan from IR Tanger)
30	GK	ALG	Azzedine Doukha
31	DF	ALG	Hicham Belkaroui
33	DF	KSA	Hussain Al-Showaish
40	DF	KSA	Muteb Al-Mutlaq (on loan from Al-Nassr)
41	MF	KSA	Abdulrahman Al-Shanar (on loan from Al-Nassr)
44	MF	KSA	Sultan Al-Farhan
49	MF	KSA	Sultan Al-Sawadi
50	GK	KSA	Mashari Sanyoor
66	DF	EGY	Mohamed Atwa
77	GK	KSA	Abdullah Al-Shammeri
80	MF	BRA	Daniel Amora
87	FW	BEL	Ilombe Mboyo
91	GK	KSA	Ahmed Al-Ghamdi

==== Out on loan ====
Note: Flags indicate national team as defined under FIFA eligibility rules; some limited exceptions apply. Players may hold more than one non-FIFA nationality.

No.	Pos.	Nation	Player
10	FW	GUI	Ismaël Bangoura (at Al-Batin until 30 June 2019)
24	DF	KSA	Abdulrahman Al-Shammari (at Al-Orobah until 30 June 2019)

No.	Pos.	Nation	Player
—	GK	KSA	Khalid Al-Moqaitib (at Al-Qaisumah until 30 June 2019)

== Transfers ==
=== In ===
Date	Pos.	Name	Previous club	Fee	Source
5 May 2018	GK	(Saudi Arabia) Abdullah Al-Shammeri	(Saudi Arabia) Al-Kawkab	End of loan	
11 May 2018	GK	(Algeria) Azzedine Doukha	(Saudi Arabia) Ohod	Free	
7 June 2018	DF	(Algeria) Hicham Belkaroui	(Portugal) Moreirense	Free	
10 June 2018	DF	(Saudi Arabia) Abdullah Al-Fahad	(Saudi Arabia) Al-Shabab	Free	
25 June 2018	FW	(Saudi Arabia) Mazen Abu Shararah	(Saudi Arabia) Al-Qadsiah	Free	
18 July 2018	MF	(Saudi Arabia) Yahya Otain	(Saudi Arabia) Al-Ettifaq	Free	
18 July 2018	MF	(Saudi Arabia) Abdullah Al-Mogren	(Saudi Arabia) Al-Washm	Free	
19 July 2018	MF	(Egypt) Ahmed El Geaidy	(Egypt) Ismaily	Free	
31 July 2018	GK	(Saudi Arabia) Ahmed Al-Ghamdi	(Saudi Arabia) Al-Wehda	Free	
17 August 2018	MF	(North Macedonia) Ferhan Hasani	(North Macedonia) Shkëndija	Free	
17 January 2019	MF	(Saudi Arabia) Abdullah Al-Sobeai	(Saudi Arabia) Al-Shabab	Free	
17 January 2019	MF	(Brazil) Kanu	(Belgium) Kortrijk	€300,000	

=== Loans in ===
Date	Pos.	Name	Parent club	End date	Source
8 June 2018	DF	(Saudi Arabia) Ali Al-Zubaidi	(Saudi Arabia) Al-Ahli	End of season	
15 June 2018	MF	(Morocco) Ahmed Hammoudan	(Morocco) Ittihad Tanger	End of season	
31 July 2018	DF	(Saudi Arabia) Muteb Al-Mutlaq	(Saudi Arabia) Al-Nassr	End of season	
18 August 2018	MF	(Belgium) Yassine El Ghanassy	(France) Nantes	4 February 2019	
2 February 2019	DF	(Saudi Arabia) Khalid Al-Ghamdi	(Saudi Arabia) Al-Nassr	End of season	
3 February 2019	FW	(Belgium) Ilombe Mboyo	(Belgium) Kortrijk	End of season	
20 February 2019	MF	(Saudi Arabia) Abdulrahman Al-Shanar	(Saudi Arabia) Al-Nassr	End of season	

=== Out ===
Date	Pos.	Name	New club	Fee	Source
5 May 2018	GK	(Saudi Arabia) Ahmed Al-Rehaili	(Saudi Arabia) Al-Ahli	End of loan	
5 May 2018	DF	(Saudi Arabia) Muteb Al-Mutlaq	(Saudi Arabia) Al-Nassr	End of loan	
5 May 2018	MF	(Saudi Arabia) Abdulaziz Al-Jamaan	(Saudi Arabia) Al-Hilal	End of loan	
5 May 2018	MF	(Egypt) Shikabala	(Egypt) Zamalek	End of loan	
2 July 2018	MF	(Saudi Arabia) Sultan Al-Sherif	(Saudi Arabia) Al-Washm	Free	
5 July 2018	GK	(Saudi Arabia) Mutab Sharahili	(Saudi Arabia) Damac	Free	
11 July 2018	DF	(Brazil) Eli Sabiá	(India) Chennaiyin	Free	
13 July 2018	MF	(Saudi Arabia) Murad Al-Rashidi	(Saudi Arabia) Al-Washm	Free	
15 July 2018	MF	(Saudi Arabia) Khaled Al-Zylaeei	(Saudi Arabia) Abha	Free	
18 July 2018	MF	(Saudi Arabia) Fahad Al-Rashidi	(Saudi Arabia) Al-Orobah	Free	
31 July 2018	MF	(Saudi Arabia) Fares Al-Ayyaf	(Saudi Arabia) Al-Hazem	Undisclosed	
19 August 2018	DF	(Saudi Arabia) Sultan Al-Ghulaimish	(Saudi Arabia) Al-Mujazzal	Free	
23 August 2018	GK	(Saudi Arabia) Abdullah Al-Zahrani	(Saudi Arabia) Al-Mujazzal	Free	
31 August 2018	MF	(Saudi Arabia) Hassan Al-Blwi	(Saudi Arabia) Al-Watani	Free	
2 September 2018	MF	(Morocco) Issam Erraki	(Morocco) Ittihad Tanger	Free	
21 November 2018	MF	(Saudi Arabia) Riyadh Al-Ibrahim	(Saudi Arabia) Al-Ain	Free	
1 January 2019	FW	(Saudi Arabia) Saqer Otaif	(Saudi Arabia) Ohod	Free	
4 February 2019	MF	(Belgium) Yassine El Ghanassy	(France) Nantes	End of loan	
6 February 2019	MF	(Egypt) Ahmed El Geaidy	(Saudi Arabia) Al-Washm	Free	

=== Loans out ===
Date	Pos.	Name	Subsequent club	End date	Source
11 July 2018	GK	(Saudi Arabia) Khaled Al-Muqaitib	(Saudi Arabia) Al-Qaisumah	End of season	
23 August 2018	DF	(Saudi Arabia) Abdulrahman Al-Shammari	(Saudi Arabia) Al-Orobah	End of season	
19 January 2019	FW	(Guinea) Ismaël Bangoura	(Saudi Arabia) Al-Batin	End of season	

== Competitions ==
=== Overall ===
Competition	Started round	Current position / round	Final position / round	First match	Last match
Pro League	—	—	8th	30 August 2018	16 May 2019
King Cup	Round of 64	—	Round of 16	5 January 2019	22 January 2019

Last Updated: 16 May 2019

=== Pro League ===
==== League table ====
Pos	Team	Pld	W	D	L	GF	GA	GD	Pts	Qualification or relegation
6	Al-Faisaly	30	12	7	11	51	47	+4	43	
7	Al-Wehda	30	12	6	12	41	41	0	42	
8	Al-Raed	30	10	8	12	38	48	−10	38	
9	Al-Fateh	30	8	11	11	32	45	−13	35	
10	Al-Ittihad	30	9	7	14	44	45	−1	34	Qualification for Arab Club Champions Cup

Source: spl.com
Rules for classification: 1) Points; 2) Head-to-head points; 3) Head-to-head goal difference; 4) Total goal difference; 5) Total goals scored; 6) Play-off (only for deciding champion, relegation and AFC competitions participation).

==== Results summary ====
Overall								Home						Away					
Pld	W	D	L	GF	GA	GD	Pts	W	D	L	GF	GA	GD	W	D	L	GF	GA	GD
30	10	8	12	38	48	−10	38	4	5	6	14	23	−9	6	3	6	24	25	−1

Last updated: 16 May 2019.
Source: Competitive matches

==== Results by round ====
Round	1	2	3	4	5	6	7	8	9	10	11	12	13	14	15	16	17	18	19	20	21	22	23	24	25	26	27	28	29	30
Ground	A	H	A	H	A	H	A	A	H	A	A	H	A	H	A	A	H	A	H	H	H	H	A	H	A	H	A	H	H	A
Result	D	L	L	D	W	L	L	W	W	L	W	D	L	W	W	D	L	D	L	D	L	D	L	W	W	L	L	W	D	W
Position	9	13	13	13	9	10	11	10	12	13	12	11	12	12	9	9	10	10	11	10	10	10	10	10	10	10	10	9	9	8

Updated to match(es) played on 16 May 2019. Source: Competitive matches
A = Away; H = Home; W = Win; D = Draw; L = Loss

==== Matches ====
All times are local, AST (UTC+3).

Win Draw Loss Postponed

30 August 2018 1	Al-Ettifaq	1–1	Al-Raed	Dammam
18:40	Al-Kwikbi 4'; Al-Aboud (yellow card) 18'; Al-Robeai (yellow card) 35'; El Sayed (yellow card) 64'; Majrashi (yellow card) 76'	Report	Al-Fahad (yellow card) 12'; Al-Shehri 89'	Stadium: Prince Mohamed bin Fahd Stadium; Attendance: 2,345; Referee: Simon Lee Evans (Wales)

15 September 2018 2	Al-Raed	1–3	Al-Hilal	Buraidah
18:50	Doukha (yellow card) 40'; Hammoudan 52'; Al-Amri (yellow card) 54'; Al-Farhan (yellow card) 74'	Report	Gomis 41'; Abdulrahman 45'; Carlos Eduardo 55' (pen.); Botía (yellow card) 68' (yellow-red card) 73'; Al-Faraj (yellow card) 74'; Al-Habsi (yellow card) 83'; Al-Shahrani (yellow card) 86'; Al-Breik (yellow card) 90+4'	Stadium: King Abdullah Sport City Stadium; Attendance: 6,833; Referee: Artur Soares Dias (Portugal)

22 September 2018 3	Al-Wehda	4–1	Al-Raed	Mecca
19:00	Fernandão 6', 17'; Renato Chaves (yellow card) 9'; Abdu Jaber 83'; Marcos Guilherme 90+5'	Report	El Ghanassy 52'; Al-Shoraimi (yellow card) 80'	Stadium: King Abdul Aziz Stadium; Attendance: 17,235; Referee: Mark Clattenburg (England)

28 September 2018 4	Al-Raed	1–1	Al-Shabab	Buraidah
18:35	Bangoura 9' (pen.), (red card) 61'; Al-Shamekh (yellow card) 27'; Amora (yellow card) 71'; Hammoudan (yellow card) 90+7'	Report	Euller (yellow card) 8'; Al-Shamrani 13'; Bahebri (yellow card) 25'; Benlamri (yellow card) 77'; Al-Khaibari (yellow card) 90'	Stadium: King Abdullah Sport City Stadium; Attendance: 2,891; Referee: Simon Lee Evans (Wales)

4 October 2018 5	Al-Fayha	0–3	Al-Raed	Al-Majma'ah
18:20	Kariri (yellow card) 7'; Asprilla (yellow card) 20'; Gómez (yellow card) 36' (yellow-red card) 71'	Report	Al-Shehri 10', 28'; Hammoudan 58'; Al-Amri (yellow card) 69'	Stadium: King Salman Sport City Stadium; Attendance: 2,106; Referee: Szymon Marciniak (Poland)

19 October 2018 6	Al-Raed	0–3	Al-Fateh	Buraidah
18:15		Report	Al-Fuhaid 27'; Naâmani (yellow card) 35'; Lajami (yellow card) 61'; Koval (yellow card) 79'; Pedro 89', (yellow card) 89'; Al-Majhad 90+3'	Stadium: King Abdullah Sport City Stadium; Attendance: 2,443; Referee: Mark Clattenburg (England)

24 October 2018 7	Al-Faisaly	2–0	Al-Raed	Al Majma'ah
18:05	Akpala 41', 73'; Al-Shamrani (yellow card) 90+3'	Report		Stadium: King Salman Sport City Stadium; Attendance: 1,003; Referee: Szymon Marciniak (Poland)

1 November 2018 8	Al-Ittihad	1–2	Al-Raed	Jeddah
19:50	Al-Sumairi (yellow card) 59'; Assiri (yellow card) 77'; Al-Muwallad 90+8'	Report	Belkaroui 45'; Al-Farhan (yellow card) 48'; Al-Shamekh 78'	Stadium: King Abdullah Sports City; Attendance: 20,250; Referee: Fabio Verissimo (Portugal)

23 November 2018 10	Al-Qadsiah	3–1	Al-Raed	Khobar
17:30	Barnawi (yellow card) 11'; Bismark 45'; Al-Zain 58'; Masrahi (yellow card) 77'; Camara 90+4'	Report	Al-Farhan (yellow card) 61'; Hammoudan 71'	Stadium: Prince Saud bin Jalawi Stadium; Attendance: 902; Referee: Artur Soares Dias (Portugal)

1 December 2018 11	Al-Batin	1–3	Al-Raed	Hafar al-Batin
17:40	Mohanna (yellow card) 42', (goal) 67'; Al-Ghamdi (yellow card) 67'; Sharahili (yellow card) 90+3'	Report	Hasani 9', 25'; Atwa (yellow card) 37'; Al-Amri (yellow card) 85'; Al-Shehri 87'	Stadium: Al-Batin Club Stadium; Attendance: 3,021; Referee: Kevin Blom (Netherlands)

8 December 2018 12	Al-Raed	0–0	Al-Ahli	Buraidah
17:50	Hammoudan (yellow card) 53'; Bangoura (yellow card) 57'; Amora (yellow card) 90+5'	Report	Díaz (red card) 61'	Stadium: King Abdullah Sport City Stadium; Attendance: 1,953; Referee: Svein Oddvar Moen (Norway)

14 December 2018 13	Al-Nassr	4–0	Al-Raed	Riyadh
15:05	Hamdallah 8' (pen.), 45+2', 45+3', 46'; Uvini (yellow card) 43'	Report	Belkaroui (yellow card) 16'; Al-Farhan (yellow card) 42'	Stadium: Prince Faisal bin Fahd Stadium; Attendance: 6,778; Referee: Ovidiu Hațegan (Romania)

20 December 2018 14	Al-Raed	1–0	Al-Hazem	Buraidah
15:20	Bangoura 60'; Al-Shehri (yellow card) 77'	Report	Bakheet (yellow card) 26' (yellow-red card) 42'; Pajoy (yellow card) 26'; Al-Saiari (yellow card) 75'	Stadium: King Abdullah Sport City Stadium; Attendance: 2,197; Referee: Artur Soares Dias (Portugal)

25 December 2018 9	Al-Raed	2–1	Al-Taawoun	Buraidah
18:00	Al-Shehri (yellow card) 4', (goal) 62'; Doukha (yellow card) 50'; Al-Showaish 55'	Report	Al-Olayan (yellow card) 8' (yellow-red card) 34'; Tawamba (yellow card) 35'; Al-Absi (yellow card) 48'; Amissi (yellow card) 58'; Jhonnattann 90'	Stadium: King Abdullah Sport City Stadium; Attendance: 8,700; Referee: Sergei Karasev (Russia)

30 December 2018 15	Ohod	0–1	Al-Raed	Medina
15:45	Mohammed (yellow card) 18' (yellow-red card) 87'; Attiyah (yellow card) 56'; Ashoor (yellow card) 63'	Report	Al-Shehri 54' (pen.), (yellow card) 78'; El Ghanassy (yellow card) 66'; Al-Shamekh (yellow card) 90+5'	Stadium: Prince Mohammed bin Abdul Aziz Stadium; Attendance: 2,800; Referee: Viktor Kassai (Hungary)

11 January 2019 16	Al-Hilal	1–1	Al-Raed	Riyadh
15:25	Jahfali (yellow card) 66'; Al-Shalhoub 90+2'	Report	Belkaroui (yellow card) 59'; Hammoudan (yellow card) 80'; Al-Shoraimi (yellow card) 84'; Abo Shararah 90+4'	Stadium: King Saud University Stadium; Attendance: 20,490; Referee: Damir Skomina (Slovenia)

29 January 2019 17	Al-Raed	1–2	Al-Ettifaq	Buraidah
18:25	Abo Shararah (yellow card) 90'; Al-Amri 90+2'	Report	Guanca 9', 45+1'; Al-Robeai (yellow card) 24'; Arias (yellow card) 50'; El Sayed (yellow card) 54'; Al-Aboud (yellow card) 90'	Stadium: King Abdullah Sport City Stadium; Attendance: 1,625; Referee: Simon Lee Evans (Wales)

4 February 2019 18	Al-Shabab	1–1	Al-Raed	Al Majma'ah
18:25	Budescu 10' (pen.); Salem (yellow card) 18'; Găman (yellow card) 41'; Al-Shammeri (yellow card) 80'	Report	Belkaroui (yellow card) 9'; Al-Shamekh 42'; Amora (yellow card) 90+5'	Stadium: King Salman Sport City Stadium; Attendance: 594; Referee: Nawaf Shukralla (Bahrain)

9 February 2019 19	Al-Raed	1–3	Al-Wehda	Buraidah
15:50	Hammoudan 11', (yellow card) 43'; Kanu (yellow card) 61'; Al-Showaish (red card) 71'	Report	Renato Chaves 29'; Otero (yellow card) 45+1'; Al-Sqoor 52', (yellow card) 84'; Marcos Guilherme 90+7'	Stadium: King Abdullah Sport City Stadium; Attendance: 1,883; Referee: Khaled Al-Teris

15 February 2019 20	Al-Raed	1–1	Al-Ittihad	Buraidah
20:20	Al-Mogren 7'	Report	Sanogo (yellow card) 56'; Al-Sahafi (yellow card) 88'; Al-Ghamdi 90+1'	Stadium: King Abdullah Sport City Stadium; Attendance: 7,449; Referee: Bartosz Frankowski (Poland)

23 February 2019 21	Al-Raed	0–3	Al-Faisaly	Buraidah
15:55		Report	Mendash 32', (yellow card) 84'; Al Ansari (yellow card) 38'; Al-Bakr 43'; Denílson 90+3'	Stadium: King Abdullah Sport City Stadium; Attendance: 1,738; Referee: Danny Makkelie (Netherlands)

1 March 2019 22	Al-Raed	0–0	Al-Qadsiah	Buraidah
16:00	Mboyo (yellow card) 51'; Kanu (yellow card) 54'; Al-Showaish (yellow card) 75'	Report	Sharahili (yellow card) 53'; Abdulmohsen. F (yellow card) 73'; M. Fallatah (yellow card) 82'; Élton (yellow card) 83'; Williams (yellow card) 90+2'	Stadium: King Abdullah Sport City Stadium; Attendance: 1,419; Referee: Kevin Blom (Netherlands)

7 March 2019 23	Al-Taawoun	2–1	Al-Raed	Buraidah
20:30	Petrolina (yellow card) 51'; Manoel (yellow card) 64'; Héldon (yellow card) 83'; Sufyani 89', 90+9', (yellow card) 90+11'	Report	Belkaroui (yellow card) 27'; Al-Fahad (yellow card) 42' (yellow-red card) 79'; Mboyo (yellow card) 52'; Al-Shehri 53' (pen.); Hammoudan (yellow card) 88'	Stadium: King Abdullah Sport City Stadium; Attendance: 9,164; Referee: Sergei Karasev (Russia)

15 March 2019 24	Al-Raed	1–0	Al-Batin	Buraidah
16:00	Hammoudan 41'; Al-Farhan (yellow card) 76'	Report	Masrahi (yellow card) 68'; Crysan (yellow card) 74'; Kanabah (yellow card) 87'	Stadium: King Abdullah Sport City Stadium; Attendance: 1,996; Referee: Paweł Gil (Poland)

28 March 2019 25	Al-Ahli	4–5	Al-Raed	Jeddah
20:40	Assiri 10', 53', (yellow card) 88'; Al-Moasher 20', (yellow card) 31'; Al-Jassim 27', (yellow card) 45+3'; Hindi (yellow card) 45+3'; Asiri (yellow card) 89'; Al-Fatil (yellow card) 90+3'	Report	Al-Amri 5', (yellow card) 29'; Al-Shehri 6', 62', 68' (pen.), 70'; Doukha (yellow card) 80'; Amora (yellow card) 90+3'	Stadium: King Abdullah Sports City; Attendance: 4,146; Referee: Pavel Královec (Czech Republic)

4 April 2019 26	Al-Raed	0–5	Al-Nassr	Buraidah
19:00	Al-Shehri (yellow card) 18' (yellow-red card) 68'	Report	Hamdallah 2', 38', 60'; Petros 8'; Atwa 28' (o.g.)	Stadium: King Abdullah Sport City Stadium; Attendance: 11,735; Referee: Bakary Gassama (Gambia)

11 April 2019 27	Al-Hazem	1–0	Al-Raed	Ar Rass
20:30	Al-Barakah (yellow card) 52'; Igboananike 76'; Al-Saiari (yellow card) 82'	Report	Al-Ghamdi (yellow card) 7'; Amora (yellow card) 49'	Stadium: Al-Hazem Club Stadium; Attendance: 1,086; Referee: Artur Soares Dias (Portugal)

19 April 2019 28	Al-Raed	5–1	Ohod	Buraidah
20:30	Mboyo 5'; Al-Shehri 28', 89' (pen.), 90+7', (yellow card) 82'; Al-Shamekh 40' (pen.)	Report	Majrashi 50'; Mohammed (yellow card) 53'; Attiyah (yellow card) 85'	Stadium: King Abdullah Sport City Stadium; Attendance: 1,974; Referee: João Capela (Portugal)

11 May 2019 29	Al-Raed	0–0	Al-Fayha	Buraidah
22:30	Kanu (yellow card) 19'; Al-Shamekh (yellow card) 90+2'	Report	Al-Qahtani (yellow card) 90+5'	Stadium: King Abdullah Sport City Stadium; Attendance: 1,360; Referee: Svein Oddvar Moen (Norway)

16 May 2019 30	Al-Fateh	0–4	Al-Raed	Al-Hasa
22:30	Al-Juhaim (yellow card) 45'	Report	Kanu 6'; Al-Sulaitin 51'; Al-Shehri 54', 65', (yellow card) 73'; Hammoudan (yellow card) 83'	Stadium: Prince Abdullah bin Jalawi Stadium; Attendance: 250; Referee: Pavel Královec (Czech Republic)

=== King Cup ===
All times are local, AST (UTC+3).

5 January 2019 Round of 64	Al-Raed	5–1	Arar	Buraidah
15:30	Al-Shoraimi 28', (yellow card) 61'; Abo Shararah 48' (pen.); Al-Shehri 51', 65'; Hasani 77'	Report	Gharbi 35'; Fernando (yellow card) 63'	Stadium: King Abdullah Sport City Stadium; Referee: Sultan Al-Okairy

16 January 2019 Round of 32	Al-Raed	2–2 (a.e.t.) (3–1 p)	Al-Ain	Buraidah
15:35	Al-Farhan (yellow card) 38'; Al-Shehri 50', 114'; Amora (yellow card) 56'; Belkaroui (yellow card) 79'; Jamal (yellow card) 119'	Report	Ouattara (yellow card) 73'; Diego Assis 86'; Dieng (yellow card) 90+1'; Al-Zahrani 108'; Majrashi (yellow card) 117'	Stadium: King Abdullah Sport City Stadium; Referee: Sami Al-Jires
	Penalties
	Hasani (penalty scored); Al-Showaish (penalty missed); Al-Mogren (penalty missed); Amora (penalty scored); Al-Shehri (penalty scored)		Dieng (penalty missed); Ba Adheem (penalty scored); Diego Assis (penalty missed); Ouattara (penalty missed)

22 January 2019 Round of 16	Al-Batin	2–1 (a.e.t.)	Al-Raed	Hafar al-Batin
15:30	Jhonnattann 19'; Baraka (yellow card) 25'; Nasser (yellow card) 58'; Waqes (yellow card) 70'; Al-Ghamdi 108'	Report	Hasani 49'; Al-Farhan (yellow card) 70'; Al-Mogren (yellow card) 80'	Stadium: Al-Batin Club Stadium; Referee: Shukri Al-Hanfoush

== Statistics ==
=== Squad statistics ===
Last updated on 16 May 2019.

No.	Pos	Nat	Player	Total		Pro League		King Cup	
No.	Pos	Nat	Player	Apps	Goals	Apps	Goals	Apps	Goals
Goalkeepers
13	GK	(Nigeria)	Abdulbassit Hawsawi	0	0	0	0	0	0
30	GK	(Algeria)	Azzedine Doukha	31	0	29	0	2	0
50	GK	(Saudi Arabia)	Mashari Sanyoor	0	0	0	0	0	0
77	GK	(Saudi Arabia)	Abdullah Al-Shammeri	2	0	1	0	1	0
Defenders
2	DF	(Saudi Arabia)	Mohammed Al-Amri	22	2	17+3	2	2	0
4	DF	(Saudi Arabia)	Yahya Al-Musalem	3	0	1+1	0	1	0
5	DF	(Saudi Arabia)	Mohammed Al-Shoraimi	11	1	3+6	0	2	1
12	DF	(Saudi Arabia)	Khalid Al-Ghamdi	4	0	3+1	0	0	0
17	DF	(Saudi Arabia)	Abdullah Al-Shamekh	29	3	25+3	3	0+1	0
19	DF	(Saudi Arabia)	Abdullah Al-Fahad	21	0	15+4	0	1+1	0
31	DF	(Algeria)	Hicham Belkaroui	22	1	18+1	1	3	0
33	DF	(Saudi Arabia)	Hussain Al-Showaish	17	1	12+4	1	0+1	0
40	DF	(Saudi Arabia)	Muteb Al-Mutlaq	16	0	8+7	0	1	0
66	DF	(Egypt)	Mohamed Atwa	30	0	28	0	2	0
Midfielders
6	MF	(Saudi Arabia)	Yahya Otain	4	0	2+2	0	0	0
7	MF	(North Macedonia)	Ferhan Hasani	27	4	20+4	2	2+1	2
14	MF	(Saudi Arabia)	Abdullah Al-Mogren	12	1	4+6	1	0+2	0
15	MF	(Saudi Arabia)	Mohanad Al-Shudukhi	6	0	0+5	0	0+1	0
16	MF	(Saudi Arabia)	Abdullah Al-Sobeai	0	0	0	0	0	0
20	MF	(Brazil)	Kanu	14	1	11+2	1	0+1	0
21	MF	(Saudi Arabia)	Badr Al-Sulaitin	5	1	1+2	1	1+1	0
27	MF	(Morocco)	Ahmed Hammoudan	29	4	27+2	4	0	0
41	MF	(Saudi Arabia)	Abdulrahman Al-Shanar	0	0	0	0	0	0
44	MF	(Saudi Arabia)	Sultan Al-Farhan	28	0	22+3	0	3	0
49	MF	(Saudi Arabia)	Sultan Al-Sawadi	9	0	9	0	0	0
80	MF	(Brazil)	Daniel Amora	32	0	29	0	3	0
Forwards
9	FW	(Saudi Arabia)	Mazen Abo Shararah	12	2	2+7	1	3	1
11	FW	(Saudi Arabia)	Saleh Al-Shehri	28	20	16+9	16	2+1	4
87	FW	(Belgium)	Ilombe Mboyo	13	2	11+2	2	0	0
Players sent out on loan this season
10	FW	(Guinea)	Ismaël Bangoura	13	2	7+5	2	1	0
Player who made an appearance this season but have left the club
3	FW	(Saudi Arabia)	Saqer Otaif	2	0	0+2	0	0	0
8	MF	(Belgium)	Yassine El Ghanassy	20	1	9+8	1	3	0
18	MF	(Egypt)	Ahmed El Geaidy	1	0	0	0	0+1	0
29	MF	(Saudi Arabia)	Riyadh Al-Ibrahim	0	0	0	0	0	0

=== Goalscorers ===
Rank	No.	Pos	Nat	Name	Pro League	King Cup	Total
1	11	FW	(Saudi Arabia)	Saleh Al-Shehri	16	4	20
2	7	MF	(North Macedonia)	Ferhan Hasani	2	2	4
2	27	MF	(Morocco)	Ahmed Hammoudan	4	0	4
4	17	DF	(Saudi Arabia)	Abdullah Al-Shamekh	3	0	3
5	2	DF	(Saudi Arabia)	Mohammed Al-Amri	2	0	2
5	9	FW	(Saudi Arabia)	Mazen Abo Shararah	1	1	2
5	10	FW	(Guinea)	Ismaël Bangoura	2	0	2
5	87	FW	(Belgium)	Ilombe Mboyo	2	0	2
9	5	DF	(Saudi Arabia)	Mohammed Al-Shoraimi	0	1	1
9	8	MF	(Belgium)	Yassine El Ghanassy	1	0	1
9	14	MF	(Saudi Arabia)	Abdullah Al-Mogren	1	0	1
9	20	MF	(Brazil)	Kanu	1	0	1
9	21	MF	(Saudi Arabia)	Badr Al-Sulaitin	1	0	1
9	31	DF	(Algeria)	Hicham Belkaroui	1	0	1
9	33	DF	(Saudi Arabia)	Hussain Al-Showaish	1	0	1
Own goal					0	0	0
Total					38	8	46

Last Updated: 16 May 2019

=== Assists ===
Rank	No.	Pos	Nat	Name	Pro League	King Cup	Total
1	27	MF	(Morocco)	Ahmed Hammoudan	6	0	6
2	87	FW	(Belgium)	Ilombe Mboyo	4	0	4
3	8	MF	(Belgium)	Yassine El Ghanassy	1	2	3
3	11	FW	(Saudi Arabia)	Saleh Al-Shehri	2	1	3
5	40	DF	(Saudi Arabia)	Muteb Al-Mutlaq	1	1	2
5	66	DF	(Egypt)	Mohamed Atwa	2	0	2
5	80	MF	(Brazil)	Daniel Amora	1	1	2
8	2	DF	(Saudi Arabia)	Mohammed Al-Amri	1	0	1
8	7	MF	(North Macedonia)	Ferhan Hasani	1	0	1
8	14	MF	(Saudi Arabia)	Abdullah Al-Mogren	1	0	1
8	17	DF	(Saudi Arabia)	Abdullah Al-Shamekh	1	0	1
8	19	DF	(Saudi Arabia)	Abdullah Al-Fahad	0	1	1
8	20	MF	(Brazil)	Kanu	1	0	1
8	21	MF	(Saudi Arabia)	Badr Al-Sulaitin	1	0	1
8	33	DF	(Saudi Arabia)	Hussain Al-Showaish	1	0	1
Total					24	6	30

Last Updated: 16 May 2019

=== Clean sheets ===
Rank	No.	Pos	Nat	Name	Pro League	King Cup	Total
1	30	GK	(Algeria)	Azzedine Doukha	8	0	8
Total					8	0	8

Last Updated: 11 May 2019
