= 2016–17 Al-Shabab FC season =

Al-Shabab
2016–17 season
- President: Abdullah Al Qurini
- Manager: Sami Al-Jaber
- Stadium: King Fahd Stadium; Faisal bin Fahd Stadium
- SPL: 4th
- Crown Prince Cup: Quarter-finals
- King Cup: Round of 32
- Top goalscorer: League: Mohamed Benyettou (5); All: Mohamed Benyettou (10)
Home colours	Away colours	Third colours
- All statistics correct as of 25 October 2016.

The 2016–17 season is the Al-Shabab Football Club's 70th season in existence and 38th consecutive season in Pro League, the top flight of Saudi Arabian football. Along with Pro League, Al-Shabab also competed in the Crown Prince Cup and King Cup.

== Players ==
=== Squad information ===
As of 29 September 2016

Note: Flags indicate national team as defined under FIFA eligibility rules; some limited exceptions apply. Players may hold more than one non-FIFA nationality.

No.	Pos.	Nation	Player
1	GK	KSA	Waleed Abdullah
22	GK	KSA	Mohammed Awaji
33	GK	KSA	Mohammed Al-Owais
50	GK	KSA	Mansor Joher
2	DF	KSA	Abdullah Al Asta
5	DF	ALG	Djamel Benlamri
13	DF	KSA	Hassan Muath
17	DF	KSA	Saleh Al-Qumaizi
19	DF	KSA	Abdullah Al-Fahad
21	DF	KSA	Jamaan Al-Dossari
24	DF	KSA	Sanad Sharahili
28	DF	KSA	Hamad Al-Jizani
35	DF	KSA	Hassan Raghfawi
66	DF	KSA	Sultan Al-Deayea
6	MF	KSA	Saud Kariri
7	MF	KSA	Abdulwahab Jaafer

No.	Pos.	Nation	Player
8	MF	KSA	Abdulmajeed Al-Sulayhem
11	MF	KSA	Ahmed Otaif (Captain)
14	MF	KSA	Badr Al-Sulaitin
15	MF	KSA	Abdulaziz Al-Bishi
16	MF	KSA	Abdullah Al-Sobeai
26	MF	URU	Sebastián Píriz
27	MF	KSA	Hattan Bahebri
29	MF	KSA	Abdulmalek Al-Shammeri
37	MF	BRA	Heberty Fernandes
39	MF	KSA	Abdurahman Khairallah
55	MF	KSA	Moshari Al-Thamali
80	MF	KSA	Abdurahman Al-Khaibari
9	FW	ALG	Mohamed Benyettou
25	FW	KSA	Rakhi Al-Shammeri
30	FW	KSA	Abdullah Al-Meqbas
70	FW	KSA	Ismael Al-Maghrebi

== Pre-season and friendlies ==
v

v

== Competitions ==
=== Overall ===
Competition	Started round	Current position / round	Final position / round	First match	Last match
Professional League	Round 1	—	—	11 August 2016	—
Crown Prince Cup	Round of 32	—	Quarter-finals	15 August 2016	24 October 2016
King Cup	Round of 32	Round of 32	—	—	—

Last Updated: 25 October 2016

=== Pro League ===
==== League table ====
Pos	Team	Pld	W	D	L	GF	GA	GD	Pts
4	Al-Ittihad (Note: Al-Ittihad were docked 3 points for failing to pay over debts.)	26	17	4	5	57	37	+20	52 (Note: Al-Nassr finished ahead of Al-Ittihad on head-to-head points: Al-Ittihad 0–1 Al-Nassr, Al-Nassr 1–1 Al-Ittihad)
5	Al-Raed	26	11	2	13	37	47	−10	35
6	Al-Shabab	26	8	9	9	28	32	−4	33
7	Al-Taawoun	26	9	4	13	33	40	−7	31
8	Al-Fateh	26	7	8	11	33	39	−6	29

Updated to match(es) played on 4 May 2017. Source: slstat.com
Rules for classification: 1) Points; 2) Head-to-head points; 3) Head-to-head goal difference; 4) Total goal difference; 5) Total goals scored; 6) Play-off (only for deciding champion, relegation and AFC competitions participation).

==== Results summary ====
Overall								Home						Away					
Pld	W	D	L	GF	GA	GD	Pts	W	D	L	GF	GA	GD	W	D	L	GF	GA	GD
21	6	9	6	23	26	−3	27	3	6	2	14	12	+2	3	3	4	9	14	−5

Last updated: 11 March 2017.
Source: Competitive matches

==== Results by round ====
Round	1	2	3	4	5	6	7	8	9	10	11	12	13	14	15	16	17	18	19	20	21	22	23	24	25	26
Ground	H	A	H	H	A	A	H	A	H	A	A	H	H	A	H	A	A	H	H	A	H	A	H	H	A	A
Result	D	L	W	D	W	W	W	W	D	D	L	D	D	D	W	L	L	D	L	D	L					
Position	8	11	8	8	6	4	4	4	5	5	6	5	5	5	5	5	5	5	5	5	5					

Updated to match(es) played on 11 March 2017. Source: Competitive matches
A = Away; H = Home; W = Win; D = Draw; L = Loss

==== Matches ====
All times are local, AST (UTC+3).

Win Draw Loss Postponed

11 August 2016 1	Al-Shabab	0–0	Al-Qadisiyah	Riyadh
19:10		Report	Barnawi (yellow card) 20'	Stadium: King Fahd International Stadium; Attendance: 1,406; Referee: Sultan Al-Harbi

20 August 2016 2	Al-Batin	1–0	Al-Shabab	Hafar al-Batin
19:10	Jorge 3'; Mohanna (yellow card) 26'; Al-Enezi (yellow card) 83'; Ayyadah (yellow card) 90+6'	Report	Sharahili (yellow card) 44'	Stadium: Al-Batin Club Stadium; Attendance: 3,020; Referee: Fahad Al-Oraini

18 September 2016 3	Al-Shabab	3–2	Al-Ahli	Riyadh
20:45	Muath (yellow card) 10'; Benyettou 52', 54', 82'; Benlamri (yellow card) 57'	Report	Al Somah 12' (pen.), 58'	Stadium: King Fahd International Stadium; Attendance: 3,101; Referee: Abdulrahman Al-Sultan

23 September 2016 4	Al-Shabab	2–2	Al-Taawoun	Riyadh
18:10	Machado 24' (o.g.); Al-Sulayhem (yellow card) 53'; Heberty 78'; Al-Fahad (yellow card) 90+1'	Report	Al-Sharid (yellow card) 57'; Otaif 67'; Muath 87' (o.g.)	Stadium: Prince Faisal bin Fahd Stadium; Attendance: 1,125; Referee: Fahad Al-Mirdasi

14 October 2016 5	Al-Khaleej	1–2	Al-Shabab	Khobar
17:55	Sami (yellow card) 5'; Al-Fahad 18' (o.g.); Al-Sheikh (yellow card) 67'; Al-Kharaa (yellow card) 90+4'	Report	Benyettou 20'; Heberty 27'; Bahebri (yellow card) 56'; Al-Fahad (yellow card) 79'	Stadium: Prince Saud bin Jalawi Stadium; Attendance: 498; Referee: Abdulrahman Al-Shehri

20 October 2016 6	Al-Ittihad	0–1	Al-Shabab	Jeddah
20:15	Fallatah (yellow card) 80'	Report	Benyettou 36'; Bahebri (yellow card) 38'; Al Asta (yellow card) 54'; Heberty (yellow card) 87'	Stadium: King Abdullah Sports City; Attendance: 32,196; Referee: Abdulrahman Al-Sultan

29 October 2016 7	Al-Shabab	v	Al-Fateh	Riyadh
18:10		Report		Stadium: King Fahd International Stadium

3 November 2016 8	Al-Faisaly	v	Al-Shabab	Al Majma'ah
17:55		Report		Stadium: King Salman Sport City Stadium

19 November 2016 9	Al-Shabab	v	Al-Wehda	Riyadh
19:45		Report		Stadium: Prince Faisal bin Fahd Stadium

26 November 2016 10	Al-Raed	v	Al-Shabab	Buraidah
17:55		Report		Stadium: King Abdullah Sport City Stadium

2 December 2016 11	Al-Hilal	v	Al-Shabab	Riyadh
19:55		Report		Stadium: King Fahd International Stadium

9 December 2016 12	Al-Shabab	v	Al-Nassr	Riyadh
19:55		Report		Stadium: King Fahd International Stadium

15 December 2016 13	Al-Shabab	v	Al-Ettifaq	Riyadh
17:50		Report		Stadium: Prince Faisal bin Fahd Stadium

14	v

15	v

16	v

17	v

18	v

19	v

20	v

21	v

22	v

23	v

24	v

25	v

26	v

=== Crown Prince Cup ===
All times are local, AST (UTC+3).

15 August 2016 Round of 32	Al-Shabab	2–0	Al-Nahda	Riyadh
19:10	Benyettou 13', 22'			Stadium: King Fahd International Stadium; Referee: Hussein Abu Shahin

27 September 2016 Round of 16	Al-Shabab	6–0	Najran	Riyadh
18:25	Heberty 45+2'; Benyettou 53', 60', 63'; Muath 86'; Al-Sulayhem 88'			Stadium: King Fahd International Stadium; Referee: Majed Al-Shamrani

24 October 2016 Quarter-finals	Al-Hilal	2–0	Al-Shabab	Riyadh
20:00	Al-Breik 11'; Léo 16'; Al-Khaibri (yellow card) 65'	Report		Stadium: King Fahd International Stadium; Referee: Fahad Al-Mirdasi

=== King Cup ===
Round of 32	v

== Statistics ==
=== Goalscorers ===
Rank	No.	Pos	Nat	Name	League	Crown Prince Cup	King Cup	Total
1	9	FW	(Algeria)	Mohamed Benyettou	5	5	0	10
2	37	MF	(Brazil)	Heberty Fernandes	2	1	0	3
3	8	MF	(Saudi Arabia)	Abdulmajeed Al-Sulayhem	0	1	0	1
3	13	DF	(Saudi Arabia)	Hassan Muath	0	1	0	1
Own goal					1	0	0	1
Total					8	8	0	16

Last Updated: 25 October 2016

=== Clean sheets ===
Rank	No.	Pos	Nat	Name	League	Crown Prince Cup	King Cup	Total
1	1	GK	(Saudi Arabia)	Waleed Abdullah	2	1	0	3
2	33	GK	(Saudi Arabia)	Mohammed Al-Owais	0	1	0	1
Total					2	2	0	4

Last Updated: 25 October 2016
