= Ahmed Saleh (disambiguation) =

Ahmed Saleh is the eldest son of Yemeni President Ali Abdullah Saleh.

Ahmad Saleh may also refer to:

- Ahmed Saleh (footballer, born 1977), Egyptian retired player
- Ahmed Khalil Saleh (born 1972), Qatari footballer
- Ahmed Saleh (Saudi footballer) (born 2001), Saudi footballer
- Ahmed Samir (footballer, born 1991) (Ahmed Samir Saleh), Jordanian footballer
- Ahmed Saleh (table tennis) (born 1979), Egyptian Olympic table tennis player
- Hussein Ahmed Salah (born 1956), Djiboutian marathon runner
