= Hazazi =

Hazazi (also spelled Hazzazi, Arabic: هزازي) is an Arabic surname. Notable people with the surname include:

- Majed Hazzazi (born 1988), Saudi footballer
- Naif Hazazi (born 1989), Saudi footballer
- Sulaiman Hazazi (born 2003), Saudi footballer
