= Mohammed Al-Khamis =

Saudi Arabian footballer

Personal information
- Date of birth: October 13, 1989 (age 37)
- Place of birth: Saudi Arabia
- Height: 1.92 m (6 ft 3 1/2 in)
- Position: Midfielder

Youth career
- Hajer

Senior career*
| Years | Team | Apps | (Gls) |
| 2008–2015 | Hajer | | |
| 2015–2016 | Al-Feiha FC | | |
| 2016–2017 | Al Jeel | | |
| 2017 | Al-Adalah | | |
| 2017–2018 | Al-Kholood | | |
| 2018 | Al-Adalah | | |
| 2019–2021 | Al-Riyadh | | |
| 2021–2022 | Al-Qala | | |
| 2022–2023 | Al-Noor | | |
| 2023–2024 | Qilwah | | |
| 2024 | Al-Nahda | | |
| 2024–2025 | Al-Omran | | |
- * Club domestic league appearances and goals

Mohammed Al-Khamis (Arabic: محمد الخميس; born October 13, 1989) is a Saudi football player who plays as a midfielder.
