= Aymen Belaïd =

Tunisian footballer (born 1989)

Personal information
- Date of birth: 2 January 1989 (age 37)
- Place of birth: Paris, France
- Height: 1.87 m (6 ft 2 in)
- Position: Centre back

Youth career
- 2002–2005: Paris
- 2005–2007: Caen
- 2007–2008: Louhans-Cuiseaux
- 2008: Banik Most

Senior career*
Years	Team	Apps	(Gls)
2008–2010	Sparta Prague B	39	(2)
2010–2011	Grenoble	8	(0)
2011–2013	Étoile du Sahel	19	(2)
2013	Lokomotiv Plovdiv	12	(1)
2014–2015	Levski Sofia	56	(1)
2016–2017	Rotherham United	20	(2)
2018–2019	Levski Sofia	17	(0)
2019	Ohod	8	(0)
2022–2023	Fleury	34	(0)
2023–2025	Créteil	48	(1)

International career^{‡}
2008–2009	Tunisia Olympic	8	(0)
2012	Tunisia	3	(0)
- * Club domestic league appearances and goals as of 17 May 2025 ‡ National team caps and goals as of 15:15, 10 June 2018 (UTC)

Aymen Belaïd (Arabic: أيمن بلعيد; born 2 January 1989) is a footballer who plays as a centre back. Born in France, he has represented Tunisia at international level.

Belaïd is the younger brother of Tijani Belaid who had a stint at Italian club Internazionale. Though born in France, the younger Belaïd is a Tunisia youth international having starred for the Olympic team in qualification for the 2009 African Nations Championship.

== Career ==
Born in Paris, Belaïd began his career with hometown club Paris FC and trained with the team until he was 15 years old. In 2005, he signed with professional club SM Caen and played on the club's under-16 team in the Championnat National 16 ans. After two seasons at the club, in August 2007, Belaïd departed the club for CS Louhans-Cuiseaux and spent a year playing on the club's under-18 team. In 2008, he departed France for the Czech Republic. Belaïd spent two months with the reserve team of Banik Most. In October 2008, he joined Sparta Prague, the rival of Slavia Prague, where his brother plays. While at Sparta, Belaïd alternated between the club's first team and the reserve team. During his stint, he also went on trials at Dutch club RKC Waalwijk and French club Grenoble. Belaïd's trial with the latter club was ultimately successful with the club signing him to a two-year contract in August 2010.

=== Rotherham United ===
On 8 January 2016, Belaïd signed a two-and-a-half-year contract with English Football League Championship side Rotherham United after a period training with the club whilst international clearance was received. On 31 August 2017 his Rotherham contract was terminated by mutual consent.

=== Ohod Club ===
On 27 February 2019, Belaïd signed for Saudi Arabian club Ohod from Levski Sofia on a free transfer, with a contract until the end of the 2018–19 season.

=== Fleury 91 ===
Belaïd joined FC Fleury 91 on 31 January 2022, until the end of the 2021–22 season.

== Career statistics ==
As of 18 May 2019

Appearances and goals by club, season and competition
Club	Season	League			National Cup		League Cup		Continental		Other		Total	
Club	Season	Division	Apps	Goals	Apps	Goals	Apps	Goals	Apps	Goals	Apps	Goals	Apps	Goals
Sparta Prague B	2009–10	Czech National Football League	27	1	0	0	0	0	0	0	0	0	27	1
Sparta Prague B	Total		27	1	0	0	0	0	0	0	0	0	27	1
Grenoble Foot 38	2010–11	Ligue 2	8	0	1	0	0	0	0	0	0	0	9	0
Grenoble Foot 38	Total		8	0	1	0	0	0	0	0	0	0	9	0
Étoile Sportive du Sahel	2011–12	Tunisian Ligue Professionnelle 1	12	2	0	0	0	0	0	0	0	0	12	2
Étoile Sportive du Sahel	2012–13	Tunisian Ligue Professionnelle 1	7	0	0	0	0	0	4	1	0	0	11	1
Étoile Sportive du Sahel	Total		19	2	0	0	0	0	4	1	0	0	23	3
Lokomotiv Plovdiv	2013–14	A Group	12	1	3	1	0	0	0	0	0	0	15	2
Lokomotiv Plovdiv	Total		12	1	3	1	0	0	0	0	0	0	15	2
Levski Sofia	2013–14	A Group	9	0	2	0	0	0	0	0	0	0	11	0
Levski Sofia	2014–15	A Group	28	0	5	1	0	0	0	0	0	0	33	1
Levski Sofia	2015–16	A Group	19	1	3	0	0	0	0	0	0	0	22	1
Levski Sofia	Total		56	1	10	1	0	0	0	0	0	0	66	2
Rotherham United	2015–16	Championship	3	0	1	0	0	0	0	0	0	0	4	0
Rotherham United	2016–17	Championship	17	2	0	0	0	0	0	0	0	0	17	2
Rotherham United	Total		20	2	1	0	0	0	0	0	0	0	21	2
Levski Sofia	2017–18	Parva Liga	6	0	0	0	—		—		—		6	0
Levski Sofia	2018–19	Parva Liga	11	0	1	0	—		—		—		12	0
Levski Sofia	Total		17	0	1	0	—		—		—		18	0
Ohod Club	2018–19	Saudi Professional League	8	0	—		—		—		—		8	0
FC Fleury 91	2021–22	National 2	0	0	—		—		—		—		0	0
Career total			167	7	16	2	0	0	4	1	0	0	187	10

== Honours ==
Étoile Sportive du Sahel

- Tunisian Cup: 2011–12
