= Fahad Hamad =

Saudi Arabian footballer

Personal information
- Full name: Fahad Mohammed Hamad Al-Yamani
- Date of birth: 23 November 1989 (age 36)
- Place of birth: Riyadh, Saudi Arabia
- Height: 1.77 m (5 ft 10 in)
- Position: Midfielder

Senior career*
Years	Team	Apps	(Gls)
2009–2014	Al-Shabab	33	(1)
2013–2014	→ Al-Taawoun (loan)	20	(1)
2014–2015	Al-Taawoun	19	(0)
2015–2017	Al-Ahli	14	(0)
2017–2018	Al-Faisaly	10	(0)
2018–2020	Ohod	37	(5)
2020–2021	Al-Diriyah	5	(0)
2021	Al-Shoulla	8	(0)
2021–2022	Al-Ansar	18	(2)
2023	Jeddah	9	(0)
2024	Al-Shaeib		

International career^{‡}
2012	Saudi Arabia	6	(0)
- * Club domestic league appearances and goals as of 18:50, 16 May 2019 (UTC) ‡ National team caps and goals as of 7 February 2021

Fahad Hamad Al-Yamani (Arabic: فهد حمد اليماني; born 23 November 1989) is a Saudi Arabian footballer who plays as a midfielder.

== Honours ==
Al-Shabab

- Saudi Premier League: 2011–12

Al-Ahli

- Saudi Premier League: 2015–16
- King Cup: 2016
- Saudi Super Cup: 2016
