= Misael Riascos =

Colombian footballer (born 1991)

Personal information
- Full name: John Misael Riascos Silva
- Date of birth: 29 March 1991 (age 35)
- Place of birth: El Charco, Colombia
- Height: 1.73 m (5 ft 8 in)
- Position: Midfielder

Senior career*
Years	Team	Apps	(Gls)
2011	Deportivo Pasto	1	(0)
2015–2018	Boyacá Chicó	114	(26)
2018–2019	Al-Batin	11	(0)
2019	→ América de Cali (loan)	15	(2)
2019	Peñarol	3	(0)
- * Club domestic league appearances and goals

John Misael Riascos Silva (born 29 March 1991) is a Colombian footballer who played as a midfielder.
