= Abdullah Al Asta =

Saudi Arabian professional footballer

Personal information
- Full name: Abdullah Ahmed Al Asta
- Date of birth: August 24, 1986 (age 40)
- Place of birth: Buraidah, Saudi Arabia
- Height: 1.74 m (5 ft 9 in)
- Positions: Left back; midfielder

Youth career
- → 2004: Al-Raed

Senior career*
Years	Team	Apps	(Gls)
2005–2017	Al-Shabab	147	(8)
2017–2019	Al-Nassr	5	(0)
- * Club domestic league appearances and goals

Abdullah Ahmed Al Asta (born 24 August 1986) is a Saudi Arabian professional footballer who plays as a left back.
