= Abdoh Besisi =

Saudi footballer (1977–2023)

Personal information
- Date of birth: 11 December 1977
- Place of birth: Jeddah, Saudi Arabia
- Date of death: 28 February 2023 (aged 45)
- Place of death: Unaizah, Saudi Arabia
- Height: 1.86 m (6 ft 1 in)
- Position: Goalkeeper

Youth career
- Al-Ahli

Senior career*
Years	Team	Apps	(Gls)
1996–2008	Al-Ahli		
2008–2013	Al-Ansar		
2013–2014	Al-Orobah		
2014–2019	Ohod		
- * Club domestic league appearances and goals

Abdoh Besisi (Arabic: عبده بسيسي; 11 December 1977 – 28 February 2023) was a Saudi footballer who played as a goalkeeper for Al-Ahli, Al-Ansar, Al-Orobah, and Ohod.

Besisi began his career at Al-Ahli as a goalkeeper where he spent twelve years at the club. He joined Al-Ansar in July 2008 spending five years at the club and helping them gain promotion to the Pro League in 2011. He had a brief stint at Al-Orobah where he spent only one season at the club before joining Ohod in 2014. He spent five years at the club and helped them gain promotion to the Pro League in 2017. He announced his retirement from football on 14 May 2019. Following his retirement, Besisi worked as a part of the technical staff at Ohod until his death on 28 February 2023.
