= Rakan Al-Hafdhi =

Saudi Arabian footballer

Rakan Al-Hafdhi راكان الحافظي
Personal information
- Full name: Rakan Saleh Al-Hafdhi
- Date of birth: September 11, 1995 (age 31)
- Place of birth: Saudi Arabia
- Height: 1.73 m (5 ft 8 in)
- Position: Forward

Team information
- Current team: Al-Dahab

Senior career*
Years	Team	Apps	(Gls)
2015–2022	Ohod		
2020	→ Al-Ansar (loan)	14	(1)
2020–2021	→ Al-Sahel (loan)	20	(0)
2022–2024	Al-Washm		
2024–	Al-Dahab		

International career
2017-2018	Saudi Arabia U23		
- * Club domestic league appearances and goals as of 9 May 2020

Rakan Al-Hafdhi (Arabic: راكان الحافظي, born 11 September 1995) is a Saudi Arabian professional footballer who plays as a forward for Al-Dahab.

== Career ==
Al-Hafdhi started his career at Ohod in Saudi First Division and signed his first contract on 20 August 2015. He scored 5 goals and made 14 appearances as Ohod earned promotion to the Pro League in the 2016–17 season. and landed with Ohod from the Saudi Professional League to the Prince Mohammad bin Salman League in 2018-19 season . On 29 January 2020, Al-Hafdhi joined Al-Ansar on a six-month loan deal.

On 14 September 2022, Al-Hafdhi joined Al-Washm.
