= Anas Zabani =

Saudi Arabian footballer

Personal information
- Full name: Anas Mahdi Zabani
- Date of birth: April 7, 1997 (age 29)
- Place of birth: Saudi Arabia
- Height: 1.72 m (5 ft 8 in)
- Position: Full-back

Youth career
- Al Tuhami
- Al-Hilal

Senior career*
Years	Team	Apps	(Gls)
2017–2019	Al-Hilal	0	(0)
2018–2019	→ Al-Batin (loan)	8	(0)
2019–2023	Al-Qadsiah	17	(0)
2022	→ Al-Shoulla (loan)	15	(0)

International career^{‡}
2016–2018	Saudi Arabia U20		
- * Club domestic league appearances and goals as of 16:32, 20 September 2020 (UTC) ‡ National team caps and goals as of 16:32, 5 July 2017 (UTC)

Anas Zabani (Arabic: انس زباني; born 7 April 1997) is a Saudi Arabian footballer who currently plays as a full-back.

== Club career ==
Anas Mahdi Zabani was a player in Al-Hilal youth, but was promoted to the first team in 2017. On 29 January 2017, Anas was promoted to Al-Hilal first team. On 29 April 2017, Anas was chosen to be a sub against Al-Wehda but he didn't play the match.

On 31 January 2023, Zabani was released by Al-Qadsiah.
