= Daniel Amora =

Brazilian footballer (born 1987)

Personal information
- Full name: Daniel Lopes Amora
- Date of birth: 20 October 1987 (age 39)
- Place of birth: Belo Horizonte, Brazil
- Position: Midfielder

Senior career*
Years	Team	Apps	(Gls)
2009–2010	Águia de Marabá	11	(0)
2011	Grêmio Barueri	12	(0)
2011	Paysandu	7	(0)
2012	Guaratinguetá	3	(0)
2012	Águia de Marabá	10	(0)
2013	América (RN)	22	(0)
2014–2015	ABC	56	(0)
2016	São Bernardo	9	(0)
2016	Sampaio Corrêa	4	(0)
2016–2019	Al-Raed	73	(3)
2019–2020	Hatta	19	(0)
2020–2021	Al-Tai	-	(-)
- * Club domestic league appearances and goals as of 12:16, 20 May 2019 (UTC)

Daniel Lopes Amora (born 20 October 1987) is a Brazilian footballer plays as a midfielder.

== Career statistics ==
As of match played 16 May 2019

Club statistics
Club	Season	League			Cup		State league		Other		Total	
Club	Season	Division	Apps	Goals	Apps	Goals	Apps	Goals	Apps	Goals	Apps	Goals
Águia de Marabá	2009	Campeonato Brasileiro Série C	6	0	0	0	0	0	—		6	0
Águia de Marabá	2010	Campeonato Brasileiro Série C	5	0	0	0	0	0	—		5	0
Águia de Marabá	Total		11	0	0	0	0	0	0	0	11	0
Grêmio Barueri	2011	Campeonato Brasileiro Série B	1	0	4	0	11	0	—		16	0
Paysandu	2011	Campeonato Brasileiro Série C	7	0	0	0	0	0	—		7	0
Guaratinguetá	2012	Campeonato Brasileiro Série B	0	0	0	0	3	0	—		3	0
Águia de Marabá	2012	Campeonato Brasileiro Série C	10	0	0	0	0	0	—		10	0
América RN	2013	Campeonato Brasileiro Série B	18	0	3	1	4	0	—		25	1
ABC	2014	Campeonato Brasileiro Série B	30	0	9	0	14	0	—		53	0
ABC	2015	Campeonato Brasileiro Série B	0	0	1	0	12	0	—		13	0
ABC	Total		30	0	10	0	26	0	0	0	66	0
São Bernardo	2016	Campeonato Brasileiro Série D	0	0	0	0	9	0	—		9	0
Sampaio Corrêa	2016	Campeonato Brasileiro Série B	4	0	0	0	0	0	—		4	0
Al-Raed	2016–17	Saudi Professional League	25	0	1	0	—		1 (Note: Appearance in the Kings Cup)	0	27	0
Al-Raed	2017–18	Saudi Professional League	19	3	1	0	—		1 (Note: Appearance in the 2018 Saudi Professional League play-offs)	0	21	3
Al-Raed	2018–19	Saudi Professional League	29	0	0	0	—		1	0	30	0
Al-Raed	Total		73	3	1	0	0	0	3	0	78	3
Career totals			154	3	18	1	53	0	3	0	228	4
