= Sanad Sharahili =

Saudi Arabian footballer

Personal information
- Full name: Sanad Ahmed Sharahili
- Date of birth: March 31, 1986 (age 40)
- Place of birth: Riyadh, Saudi Arabia
- Height: 1.82 m (6 ft 0 in)
- Position: Defender

Youth career
- Al-Shabab

Senior career*
Years	Team	Apps	(Gls)
2006–2012	Al-Shabab		
2012–2013	Al-Ettifaq	8	(0)
2013–2015	Al-Taawon	35	(1)
2015–2016	Al-Raed	11	(0)
2016–2017	Al-Shabab		
2018	Al Kawkb		
2019–2020	Al-Anwar		
2020–2021	Al-Taqadom		
2021–2023	Mudhar		
- * Club domestic league appearances and goals

Sanad Sharahili (Arabic: سند شراحيلي, born 31 March 1986) is a Saudi Arabian football player who plays as a defender.

== Club career ==
Played for Al-Kawkab in Saudi Arabia's second division. Sharahili has participated in numerous matches and competitions within the Saudi leagues. He has been a part of Al-Kawkab's efforts in various tournaments, contributing to the team's standing in the league
