= Abdullah Al-Rashidi (footballer) =

Saudi Arabian footballer

Abdullah Al-Rashidi عبد الله الرشيدي
Personal information
- Full name: Abdullah Saeed Al-Rashidi
- Date of birth: 28 March 1997 (age 29)
- Place of birth: Medina, Saudi Arabia
- Height: 1.71 m (5 ft 7 in)
- Position: Right back

Team information
- Current team: Al-Jabalain
- Number: 19

Youth career
- –2018: Ohod

Senior career*
Years	Team	Apps	(Gls)
2018–2020	Ohod	2	(0)
2019	→ Al-Ain (loan)	12	(0)
2020	→ Al-Ain (loan)	11	(0)
2020–2023	Al-Ain	64	(2)
2023–2024	Al-Adalah	30	(0)
2024–2025	Al-Kholood	1	(0)
2025	Al-Zulfi	0	(0)
2025–	Al-Jabalain	0	(0)
- * Club domestic league appearances and goals as of 30 May 2024

Abdullah Al-Rashidi (Arabic: عبد الله الرشيدي; born 28 March 1997) is a Saudi Arabian professional footballer who plays as a right back for Al-Jabalain.

== Career ==
Al-Rashidi started his career with the youth team of Ohod and represented the club at every level. On 3 February 2019, Al-Rashidi joined Al-Ain on loan until the end of the season from Ohod. After returning to Ohod, Al-Rashidi went on to make four appearances in all competitions before being loaned to Al-Ain once again on 6 January 2020. Al-Rashidi also helped Al-Ain achieve promotion to the Pro League for the first time in the club's history. On 2 October 2020, Al-Rashidi joined Al-Ain permanently. He signed a three-year contract with the club.

On 9 July 2023, Al-Rashidi joined Al-Adalah.

On 5 July 2024, Al-Rashidi joined Al-Kholood.

On 31 January 2025, Al-Rashidi joined Al-Zulfi. In September 2025, Al-Rashidi joined Al-Jabalain.
