= Sami Kassar =

Saudi Arabian footballer

Personal information
- Full name: Sami Kassar Al-Shammeri
- Date of birth: June 2, 1990 (age 36)
- Place of birth: Saudi Arabia
- Height: 1.70 m (5 ft 7 in)
- Position: Left-back

Youth career
- 2007–2010: Al-Taawoun

Senior career*
Years	Team	Apps	(Gls)
2010–2012	Al-Amal		
2012–2016	Al-Najma		
2016–2017	Al-Faisaly	1	(0)
2017	→ Ohod (loan)	10	(0)
2017–2019	Ohod	39	(1)
2019–2020	Damac	5	(0)
2020–2022	Ohod	21	(0)
2022	Al-Sahel	1	(0)
2022–2023	Mudhar		
2023	Al-Najma		
2023–2024	Al-Kawkab		
- * Club domestic league appearances and goals as of 11 January 2019

Sami Kassar (Arabic: سامي كسار; born 2 June 1990) is a Saudi football player who plays as a left-back.
