= Badr Al-Sulaitin =

Saudi Arabian footballer

Personal information
- Full name: Badr Mansor Al-Sulaitin
- Date of birth: 16 July 1990 (age 36)
- Place of birth: Saudi Arabia
- Height: 1.76 m (5 ft 9 in)
- Position: Midfielder

Youth career
- Al-Shabab

Senior career*
Years	Team	Apps	(Gls)
2012–2017	Al-Shabab	34	(3)
2017–2019	Al-Raed	12	(1)
2019–2020	Al-Adalah	12	(0)
2021	Al-Shoalah		
- * Club domestic league appearances and goals as of 31 January 2017

Badr Al-Sulaitin (born 16 July 1990) is a Saudi Arabian footballer who plays as a midfielder.
