= Ahmed Saleh (Saudi footballer) =

Saudi Arabian footballer (born 2001)

Ahmed Saleh أحمد صالح
Personal information
- Full name: Ahmed Mohammed Saleh Amien
- Date of birth: 23 January 2001 (age 25)
- Position: Midfielder

Youth career
- –2018: Ohod

Senior career*
Years	Team	Apps	(Gls)
2018–2023	Ohod	51	(1)
2020–2021	→ Al-Dahab (loan)		
2023–2024	Al-Safa		
- * Club domestic league appearances and goals

Ahmed Mohammed Saleh Amien (born 23 January 2001), commonly known as Ahmed Saleh, is a Saudi Arabian professional footballer who plays as a midfielder.

On 16 September 2023, Ahmed Saleh joined Al-Safa.
