= Baraka (footballer) =

Brazilian footballer (born 1986)

Personal information
- Full name: Andres Fernandes Gonçalves
- Date of birth: 21 July 1986 (age 40)
- Place of birth: Avaré, Brazil
- Height: 1.81 m (5 ft 11 1/2 in)
- Position: Defensive midfielder

Team information
- Current team: Oeste

Youth career
- –2006: Penapolense

Senior career*
Years	Team	Apps	(Gls)
2006	Penapolense		
2007–2008	Linense		
2008	→ Oeste (loan)		
2008–2009	Flamengo-SP		
2010–2014	Mogi Mirim	51	(1)
2010	→ Figueirense (loan)	17	(0)
2011	→ Criciúma (loan)	20	(1)
2012–2013	→ Ponte Preta (loan)	101	(1)
2014–2015	Coritiba	21	(0)
2015–2016	Ceará	65	(0)
2017	Santo André	6	(0)
2017–2018	Guarani	41	(1)
2018–2019	Al-Batin	29	(1)
2019–2020	Vitória	22	(0)
2020	Al-Ansar	10	(0)
2021	XV de Piracicaba	7	(0)
2021–2022	Sampaio Corrêa	9	(0)
2022–2023	São Caetano	15	(0)
2023	Santa Cruz	3	(0)
2023–	Oeste		
- * Club domestic league appearances and goals as of 4 April 2023

Andres Fernandes Gonçalves (born 21 July 1986), known as just Baraka, is a Brazilian footballer who plays as a defensive midfielder for Oeste. He is the brother of Pedro Fernandes, a model, actor and musical artist.
