= Omar Mohammed (Saudi footballer) =

Saudi Arabian footballer

Omar Mohammed عمر محمد
Personal information
- Full name: Omar Mohammed Ibrahim Hawsawi
- Date of birth: July 30, 1993 (age 33)
- Place of birth: Saudi Arabia
- Height: 1.67 m (5 ft 6 in)
- Position: Defender

Team information
- Current team: Al-Rawdah
- Number: 55

Youth career
- –2014: Ohod

Senior career*
Years	Team	Apps	(Gls)
2014–2019	Ohod	?	(8)
2019–2021	Al-Hazem	1	(0)
2021	→ Ohod (loan)	13	(0)
2021–2022	Al-Kawkab	36	(2)
2022–2023	Al-Sahel	5	(0)
2023–2024	Al-Diriyah		
2024–2025	Tuwaiq		
2025–	Al-Rawdah		
- * Club domestic league appearances and goals as of 5 May 2020

Omar Mohammed Ibrahim Hawsawi (Arabic: عمر محمد إبراهيم هوساوي; born 30 July 1993) is a Saudi Arabian professional footballer who plays as a defender for Al-Rawdah.

== Career ==
Omar Mohammed started his career at Ohod in Saudi Second Division and earned promotion with Ohod from the Saudi Second Division to the Saudi First Division in the 2014–15 season. During the 2016–17 season he captained Ohod to promotion to the Saudi Professional League. On 10 July 2019, Omar Mohammed left Ohod and joined Al-Hazem following Ohod's relegation to the MS League. On 7 January 2021, Omar Mohammed joined Ohod on loan until the end of the season. On 14 August 2021, he joined Al-Kawkab. On 5 July 2022, Omar Mohammed joined Al-Sahel following Al-Kawkab's relegation. On 11 July 2023, Omar Mohammed joined Al-Diriyah. On 18 July 2024, Omar Mohammed joined Tuwaiq. On 27 September 2025, Omar Mohammed joined Al-Rawdah.
