= Fahad Al-Johani (footballer, born 1991) =

Saudi Arabian footballer

Personal information
- Full name: Fahad Ayed Al-Johani
- Date of birth: 26 October 1991 (age 35)
- Place of birth: Saudi Arabia
- Height: 1.79 m (5 ft 10 in)
- Position: Forward

Team information
- Current team: Al-Arabi
- Number: 19

Youth career
- Al-Hilal

Senior career*
Years	Team	Apps	(Gls)
2010–2013	Al-Hilal	3	(0)
2013–2016	Al-Raed	65	(12)
2016–2019	Al-Qadsiah	21	(3)
2018	→ Al-Fayha (loan)	6	(1)
2018–2019	→ Al-Batin (loan)	20	(3)
2020–2023	Al-Tai	60	(9)
2023–2024	Damac	14	(0)
2024–2025	Al-Jabalain	31	(9)
2025–2026	Al-Wehda	8	(1)
2026–	Al-Arabi	1	(0)
- * Club domestic league appearances and goals as of 12 August 2023

Fahad Al-Johani (Arabic: فهد الجهني; born 26 October 1991) is a Saudi professional footballer who plays for Al-Arabi as a forward.

== Career ==
On 11 July 2023, Al-Johani joined Damac on a free transfer. On 22 August 2024, Al-Johani joined Al-Jabalain. In September 2025, Al-Johani joined Al-Wehda.
