= Adolphe Teikeu =

Cameroonian footballer (born 1990)

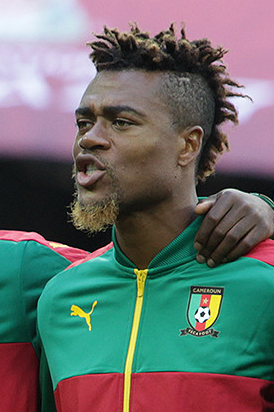
- Teikeu with Cameroon at the 2017 FIFA Confederations Cup

Personal information
- Full name: Adolphe Teikeu Kamgang
- Date of birth: 23 June 1990 (age 36)
- Place of birth: Bandjoun, Cameroon
- Height: 1.89 m (6 ft 2 in)
- Position: Defender

Youth career
- –2008: Canon Yaoundé

Senior career*
Years	Team	Apps	(Gls)
2008–2009	Canon Yaoundé		
2009–2014	Metalurh Zaporizhzhia	113	(8)
2013	→ Krasnodar (loan)	5	(0)
2014–2015	Chornomorets Odesa	21	(0)
2015	→ Terek Grozny (loan)	1	(0)
2015–2018	Sochaux	73	(4)
2018–2019	Ohod Club	27	(2)
2019–2020	Sochaux	18	(0)
2020–2021	BB Erzurumspor	18	(0)
2021–2023	Caen	19	(0)

International career^{‡}
2009	Cameroon U20	3	(0)
2011	Cameroon U23		
2016–	Cameroon	23	(0)
Medal record
Men's football
Representing Cameroon
Africa Cup of Nations
Winner	2017 Gabon
- * Club domestic league appearances and goals as of 15 October 2022 ‡ National team caps and goals as of 24 January 2023

Adolphe Teikeu Kamgang (born 23 June 1990) is a Cameroonian professional footballer who played as a defender for the French Ligue 3 club Caen and the Cameroon national team.

== Career ==
=== Club career ===
Born in Bandjoun, Adolphe Teikeu began his career in Cameroon with Arsenal Yaoundé. During the winter transfer window of 2009 he was transferred to FC Metalurh Zaporizhya.

In February 2015, Teikeu joined FC Terek Grozny on loan.

=== International career ===
Adolphe Teikeu has played for Cameroon at Under-20 level. In 2009, he played in the 2009 FIFA U-20 World Cup, where he played three games. Teikeu made his debut for the Cameroon national football team against South Africa in March 2016. He also won the African Cup of Nations with Cameroon in 2017.

== Career statistics ==
=== Club ===
As of match played 1 July 2018

Appearances and goals by club, season and competition
Club	Season	League			Cup		Continental		Total	
Club	Season	Division	Apps	Goals	Apps	Goals	Apps	Goals	Apps	Goals
Metalurh Zaporizhya	2008–09	Ukrainian Premier League	10	1			–		10	1
Metalurh Zaporizhya	2009–10	Ukrainian Premier League	25	4	2	0	–		27	4
Metalurh Zaporizhya	2010–11	Ukrainian Premier League	26	0	3	0	–		19	0
Metalurh Zaporizhya	2011–12	Ukrainian Premier League	26	2	3	0	–		29	2
Metalurh Zaporizhya	2012–13	Ukrainian Premier League	15	1	1	0	–		16	1
Metalurh Zaporizhya	2013–14	Ukrainian Premier League	11	0	2	0	–		13	0
Metalurh Zaporizhya	Total		113	8	11	0	0	0	124	8
Krasnodar (loan)	2012–13	Russian Premier League	5	0	0	0	–		5	0
Chornomorets Odesa	2013–14	Ukrainian Premier League	10	0	2	0	–		12	0
Chornomorets Odesa	2014–15	Ukrainian Premier League	11	0	2	0	2	0	15	0
Chornomorets Odesa	Total		21	0	4	0	2	0	27	0
Terek Grozny (loan)	2014–15	Russian Premier League	1	0	0	0	–		1	0
Terek Grozny (loan)	Total		1	0	0	0	0	0	1	0
Sochaux	2015–16	Ligue 2	27	1	5	1	–		32	2
Sochaux	2016–17	Ligue 2	20	1	2	0	–		22	1
Sochaux	2017–18	Ligue 2	26	2	3	1	–		29	3
Sochaux	Total		73	4	10	2	0	0	83	6
Career total			191	12	25	2	2	0	218	10

=== International ===
As of match played 27 May 2018

Appearances and goals by national team and year
National team	Year	Apps	Goals
Cameroon	2016	4	0
Cameroon	2017	16	0
Cameroon	2018	2	0
Total		22	0
