= Majed Hazazi =

Saudi Arabian footballer

Personal information
- Full name: Majed Hussain Hazazi
- Date of birth: July 1, 1988 (age 38)
- Place of birth: Saudi Arabia
- Height: 1.70 m (5 ft 7 in)
- Position: Full back

Team information
- Current team: Al-Sadd
- Number: 88

Youth career
- ?–2007: Al-Nassr

Senior career*
Years	Team	Apps	(Gls)
2007–2010	Al-Nassr	?	(?)
2010–2011	Al-Taawoun	24	(0)
2011–2013	Al-Raed	25	(0)
2013–2015	Al-Taawoun	48	(1)
2015–2018	Al-Fateh	58	(1)
2019	Ohod	13	(1)
2019–2020	Damac	22	(0)
2020–2021	Al-Jabalain	35	(1)
2021–2022	Al-Orobah	32	(0)
2022–2023	Hajer	8	(0)
2023–2024	Al-Shoulla	28	(0)
2024–	Al-Sadd		

International career
2008	Saudi Arabia		
- * Club domestic league appearances and goals

Majed Hazazi (Arabic: ماجد هزازي; born July 1, 1988) is a Saudi Arabian football player who currently plays as a full back for Al-Sadd.

He was a member of the Saudi football team in the 2010 FIFA World Cup qualification.
