= Osama Ashoor =

Saudi Arabian footballer

Personal information
- Full name: Osama Ashoor Mahmoud
- Date of birth: January 7, 1990 (age 36)
- Place of birth: Saudi Arabia
- Height: 1.72 m (5 ft 7 1/2 in)
- Position: Defender

Youth career
- Al-Nassr

Senior career*
Years	Team	Apps	(Gls)
2009–2013	Al-Nassr	4	(0)
2013	Al-Fateh	0	(0)
2014–2015	Ohod		
2016	Al-Riyadh		
2016–2019	Ohod	45	(0)
2019–2020	Abha	10	(0)
2021	Ohod	13	(0)
2021–2022	Al-Kawkab	25	(0)
2022–2023	Al-Dahab		
2023	Bisha		
2023–2024	Al-Kawkab		
- * Club domestic league appearances and goals as of 9 September 2020

Osama Ashoor (Arabic: أسامة عاشور; born 7 January 1990) is a Saudi football player who plays as a defender.
