= Zied Ounalli =

Tunisian footballer

Personal information
- Date of birth: 8 February 1994 (age 32)
- Height: 1.75 m (5 ft 9 in)
- Position: Winger

Team information
- Current team: US Tataouine
- Number: 7

Senior career*
Years	Team	Apps	(Gls)
2014–2015	ES Zarzis	25	(5)
2015–2016	Espérance de Tunis	1	(0)
2016	→ Stade Tunisien (loan)	11	(1)
2016–2017	ES Zarzis	27	(6)
2017–2020	CA Bizertin	57	(15)
2019	→ Al-Batin FC (loan)	12	(4)
2020–2021	Al-Kawkab	18	(2)
2021	Al-Tai	19	(6)
20212022	Al-Bukiryah	13	(1)
2022–2024	CS Chebba	13	(1)
2024–	US Tataouine	4	(0)
- * Club domestic league appearances and goals

Zied Ounalli (born 8 February 1994) is a Tunisian professional footballer who plays for US Tataouine as a winger.
