= Ghazi Abderrazzak =

Tunisian footballer

Personal information
- Full name: Ghazi Abderrazzak
- Date of birth: 16 October 1986 (age 40)
- Place of birth: Beni Hassen, Tunisia
- Height: 1.76 m (5 ft 9 in)
- Position: Defender

Team information
- Current team: Hammam-Sousse
- Number: 3

Senior career*
Years	Team	Apps	(Gls)
2009–2010	Hammam-Sousse	2	(0)
2010–2018	Étoile du Sahel	139	(3)
2019	Ohod	13	(0)
2019–	Club Africain	0	(0)
2019–20	→ Ben Guerdane (loan)	10	(0)
2019-23	Club Africain	68	(0)
2023-2026	US Ben Guerdane	79	(1)
2026-	Hammam-Sousse	1	(0)
- * Club domestic league appearances and goals as of 30 August 2026 @ 12:43(AEST)

Ghazi Abderrazzak (born 16 October 1986) is a Tunisian footballer for Hammam-Sousse.
