= João Gabriel (footballer, born 1989) =

Brazilian footballer

Personal information
- Full name: João Gabriel Farinello Rosa
- Date of birth: July 9, 1989 (age 37)
- Place of birth: São Paulo, Brazil
- Height: 1.90 m (6 ft 3 in)
- Position: Centre back

Team information
- Current team: Portuguesa Santista

Senior career*
Years	Team	Apps	(Gls)
2011–2013	Volta Redonda	4	(0)
2013	Rio Claro	6	(0)
2013	Fortaleza	1	(0)
2014	Atlético Monte Azul	17	(1)
2014	Penapolense	10	(1)
2015	Rio Branco	12	(1)
2016	Rio Claro	13	(0)
2016–2018	Oaxaca	20	(1)
2018	São Bento	5	(0)
2018–2019	Al-Batin	3	(0)
2019	Tampico Madero	0	(0)
2019	Rio Claro	0	(0)
2020–	Portuguesa Santista	0	(0)
- * Club domestic league appearances and goals as of 13:25, 20 April 2020 (UTC)

Joao Gabriel Farinello Rosa (born 9 July 1989) is a Brazilian professional footballer who plays for Portuguesa Santista as a defender.
