= Jadaan Mohanna =

Saudi Arabian footballer

Personal information
- Full name: Jadaan Mohanna Al-Shammeri
- Date of birth: January 12, 1992 (age 34)
- Place of birth: Hafar al-Batin, Saudi Arabia
- Position: Midfielder

Youth career
- Al-Batin

Senior career*
Years	Team	Apps	(Gls)
2009–2020	Al-Batin		
2021–2022	Al-Qaisumah		
- * Club domestic league appearances and goals as of 15:54, 24 September 2016 (UTC)

Jadaan Mohanna Al-Shammeri (Arabic: جدعان مهنا الشمري, born 12 January 1992) is a Saudi football player who plays as a midfielder, most recently for Al-Qaisumah.

== Honours ==
Al-Batin

- MS League: 2019–20
