= Saqer Otaif =

Saudi Arabian footballer

Personal information
- Full name: Saqer Ibrahim Otaif
- Date of birth: September 3, 1990 (age 36)
- Place of birth: Riyadh, Saudi Arabia
- Height: 1.70 m (5 ft 7 in)
- Position: Forward

Youth career
- Al-Shabab

Senior career*
Years	Team	Apps	(Gls)
2011–2012	Al-Shabab	0	(0)
2012–2014	Louletano	24	(5)
2014	Al-Shabab	2	(0)
2015–2016	Al-Wehda	27	(5)
2016–2017	Al-Taawoun	13	(2)
2017–2019	Al-Raed	23	(5)
2019	Ohod	7	(3)
2019–2021	Al-Fateh	12	(0)
2021–2022	Al-Fayha	3	(0)
2022	Al-Qadsiah	8	(0)
- * Club domestic league appearances and goals

Saqer Otaif (Arabic: صقر عطيف; born 3 September 1990) is a Saudi Arabian professional footballer who plays as a forward.
