= 2021–22 Al-Raed FC season =

Al-Raed
2021–22 season
- Chairman: Fahad Al-Motawa'a
- Manager: Pablo Machín (until 26 January); João Pedro Sousa (from 26 January until 24 May); Yousef Al-Ghadeer (from 6 June)
- Stadium: King Abdullah Sport City Stadium
- SPL: 7th
- King Cup: Round of 16 (knocked out by Al-Hilal)
- Top goalscorer: League: Karim El Berkaoui (13 goals); All: Karim El Berkaoui (13 goals)
- Highest home attendance: 20,082 (vs. Al-Hilal, 13 March 2022)
- Lowest home attendance: 668 (vs. Al-Fateh, 12 August 2021)
- Average home league attendance: 6,013

The 2021–22 season was Al-Raed's 68th year in their history and 14th consecutive season in the Pro League. The club participated in the Pro League and the King Cup.

The season covered the period from 1 July 2021 to 30 June 2022.

== Players ==
=== Squad information ===
As of 1 February 2022

Note: Flags indicate national team as defined under FIFA eligibility rules; some limited exceptions apply. Players may hold more than one non-FIFA nationality.

No.	Pos.	Nation	Player
3	MF	GHA	Christian Atsu
4	DF	KSA	Khaled Al-Khathlan
5	MF	BRA	Eduardo Henrique (on loan from Sporting CP)
6	MF	KSA	Abdullah Majrashi
8	MF	KSA	Yahya Al-Shehri
9	FW	KSA	Raed Al-Ghamdi
10	MF	MAR	Mohamed Fouzair
11	FW	MAR	Karim El Berkaoui
12	DF	KSA	Mohammed Salem
13	DF	KSA	Abdullah Al-Shanqiti (on loan from Al-Nassr)
17	FW	POR	Eder
18	MF	KSA	Naif Hazazi
19	DF	KSA	Abdullah Al-Fahad
20	FW	KSA	Rakan Al-Dossari
21	DF	KSA	Ageel Balghaith

No.	Pos.	Nation	Player
23	GK	KSA	Ahmed Al-Rehaili
25	DF	BRA	Renê Santos
27	MF	KSA	Awadh Khamis
31	DF	KSA	Mansoor Al-Harbi
32	DF	KSA	Mohammed Al-Dossari
33	GK	KSA	Mutlaq Al-Hurayji
35	MF	KSA	Mansor Al-Beshe (on loan from Al-Hilal)
40	DF	KSA	Muteb Al-Mutlaq
44	MF	KSA	Sultan Al-Farhan
45	MF	KSA	Yahya Sunbul
47	FW	KSA	Abdulrahman Al-Ghamdi
49	MF	KSA	Ahmed Al-Zain
50	GK	KSA	Mashari Sanyoor
74	MF	KSA	Abdulmohsen Al-Qahtani

==== Out on loan ====
Note: Flags indicate national team as defined under FIFA eligibility rules; some limited exceptions apply. Players may hold more than one non-FIFA nationality.

No.	Pos.	Nation	Player
2	DF	KSA	Fahad Al-Suyayfy (at Al-Jandal until 30 June 2022)
16	MF	KSA	Bander Faleh (at Al-Shoulla until 30 June 2022)

No.	Pos.	Nation	Player
77	FW	KSA	Rayan Al-Marshod (at Al-Arabi until 30 June 2022)

== Transfers and loans ==
=== Transfers in ===
Entry date	Position	No.	Player	From club	Fee	Ref.
30 June 2021	DF	40	(Saudi Arabia) Muteb Al-Mutlaq	(Saudi Arabia) Al-Sahel	End of loan	
30 June 2021	MF	16	(Saudi Arabia) Bander Faleh	(Saudi Arabia) Al-Shoulla	End of loan	
30 June 2021	MF	70	(Saudi Arabia) Hussain Al-Hajoj	(Saudi Arabia) Najran	End of loan	
30 June 2021	MF	–	(Saudi Arabia) Mohanad Al-Shudukhi	(Saudi Arabia) Al-Bukiryah	End of loan	
30 June 2021	FW	9	(Saudi Arabia) Raed Al-Ghamdi	(Saudi Arabia) Al-Nassr	End of loan	
30 June 2021	FW	77	(Saudi Arabia) Rayan Al-Marshoud	(Saudi Arabia) Al-Bukiryah	End of loan	
1 July 2021	DF	12	(Saudi Arabia) Mohammed Salem	(Saudi Arabia) Al-Shabab	Free	
1 July 2021	DF	25	(Brazil) René Santos	(Portugal) Marítimo	Free	
17 July 2021	MF	3	(Ghana) Christian Atsu	(England) Newcastle United	Free	
29 July 2021	MF	18	(Saudi Arabia) Naif Hazazi	(Saudi Arabia) Al-Qadsiah	Free	
7 August 2021	MF	74	(Saudi Arabia) Abdulmohsen Al-Qahtani	(Saudi Arabia) Al-Qadsiah	Free	
19 August 2021	MF	8	(Saudi Arabia) Yahya Al-Shehri	(Saudi Arabia) Al-Nassr	Free	
26 August 2021	GK	33	(Saudi Arabia) Mutlaq Al-Hurayji	(Saudi Arabia) Al-Batin	Free	
26 August 2021	MF	45	(Saudi Arabia) Yahya Sunbul	(Saudi Arabia) Jeddah	Free	
31 August 2021	GK	99	(Spain) Iago Herrerín	(Spain) Athletic Bilbao	Free	
23 September 2021	FW	17	(Portugal) Eder	(Russia) Lokomotiv Moscow	Free	

=== Loans in ===
Start date	End date	Position	No.	Player	From club	Fee	Ref.
2 July 2021	End of season	MF	35	(Saudi Arabia) Mansor Al-Beshe	(Saudi Arabia) Al-Hilal	None	
6 August 2021	End of season	MF	5	(Brazil) Eduardo Henrique	(Portugal) Sporting CP	None	
7 August 2021	End of season	DF	13	(Saudi Arabia) Abdullah Al-Shanqiti	(Saudi Arabia) Al-Nassr	None	

=== Transfers out ===
Exit date	Position	No.	Player	To club	Fee	Ref.
30 June 2021	MF	17	(Germany) Marko Marin	(Saudi Arabia) Al-Ahli	End of loan	
30 June 2021	MF	35	(Saudi Arabia) Mansor Al-Beshe	(Saudi Arabia) Al-Hilal	End of loan	
30 June 2021	FW	20	(Saudi Arabia) Abdulfattah Adam	(Saudi Arabia) Al-Nassr	End of loan	
1 July 2021	MF	–	(Saudi Arabia) Mohanad Al-Shudukhi	(Saudi Arabia) Al-Najma	Free	
8 July 2021	DF	33	(Saudi Arabia) Hussein Al-Shuwaish	(Saudi Arabia) Al-Fayha	Free	
28 July 2021	FW	99	(Chile) Ronnie Fernández	(Chile) Santiago Wanderers	Free	
3 August 2021	MF	8	(Cameroon) Arnaud Djoum	(Cyprus) Apollon Limassol	Free	
7 August 2021	DF	12	(Saudi Arabia) Fawaz Fallatah	(Saudi Arabia) Al-Orobah	Free	
27 August 2021	MF	7	(Saudi Arabia) Mohammed Al-Sahli	(Saudi Arabia) Damac	Undisclosed	
31 August 2021	DF	73	(Serbia) Nemanja Miletić	(Serbia) Partizan	Free	
3 September 2021	MF	29	(Saudi Arabia) Mohammad Al-Subaie	(Saudi Arabia) Al-Safa	Free	
9 September 2021	MF	70	(Saudi Arabia) Hussain Al-Hajoj	(Saudi Arabia) Al-Kawkab	Free	
11 September 2021	GK	30	(Algeria) Azzedine Doukha	(Algeria) JS Kabylie	Free	
31 January 2022	MF	14	(Saudi Arabia) Abdullah Al-Mogren	(Saudi Arabia) Al-Ahli	Undisclosed	
25 March 2022	MF	15	(Saudi Arabia) Jaber Issa	(Armenia) FC Van	Free	
15 June 2022	GK	99	(Spain) Iago Herrerín		Released	

=== Loans out ===
Start date	End date	Position	No.	Player	To club	Fee	Ref.
29 August 2021	End of season	MF	16	(Saudi Arabia) Bander Faleh	(Saudi Arabia) Al-Shoulla	None	
15 September 2021	End of season	FW	77	(Saudi Arabia) Rayan Al-Marshoud	(Saudi Arabia) Al-Arabi	None	
22 January 2022	End of season	DF	2	(Saudi Arabia) Fahad Al-Suyayfy	(Saudi Arabia) Al-Jandal	None	

== Pre-season ==
Win Draw Loss Fixtures

21 July 2021 Friendly	Ibiza (Spain)	2–0	(Saudi Arabia) Al-Raed	Orihuela, Spain
19:00 CEST (UTC+2)				Stadium: Estadio Municipal Los Arcos

== Competitions ==
=== Pro League ===
==== League table ====
Pos	Team	Pld	W	D	L	GF	GA	GD	Pts
5	Damac	30	12	8	10	38	44	−6	44
6	Al-Tai	30	11	4	15	33	45	−12	37
7	Al-Raed	30	10	6	14	35	45	−10	36
8	Al-Fateh	30	9	8	13	45	41	+4	35 (Note: Head-to-head points: Al-Fateh 5, Abha 5, Al-Fayha 4. Head-to-head goal difference: Al-Fateh +1, Abha –1.)
9	Abha	30	9	8	13	27	43	−16	35

Source: spl.com
Rules for classification: 1) Points; 2) Head-to-head points; 3) Head-to-head goal difference; 4) Total goal difference; 5) Total goals scored; 6) Fair-play points (Note: Head-to-head record is used only after all the matches between the teams in question have been played).

==== Results summary ====
Overall								Home						Away					
Pld	W	D	L	GF	GA	GD	Pts	W	D	L	GF	GA	GD	W	D	L	GF	GA	GD
30	10	6	14	35	45	−10	36	7	2	6	14	15	−1	3	4	8	21	30	−9

Last updated: 27 June 2022.
Source: spl.sa

==== Results by round ====
Round	1	2	3	4	5	6	7	8	9	10	11	12	13	14	15	16	17	18	19	20	21	22	23	24	25	26	27	28	29	30
Ground	H	A	H	A	A	H	H	A	A	H	H	A	A	H	A	A	H	A	H	H	A	A	H	H	A	A	H	H	A	H
Result	W	L	W	D	W	D	L	L	L	W	W	D	L	W	L	W	L	L	D	L	D	L	W	L	L	D	L	L	W	W
Position	5	10	5	5	3	3	5	8	10	6	6	5	6	6	7	6	6	8	7	8	8	9	7	9	9	9	12	14	12	7

Updated to match(es) played on 27 June 2022. Source: spl.com.sa
A = Away; H = Home; W = Win; D = Draw; L = Loss

==== Matches ====
All times are local, AST (UTC+3).

Win Draw Loss Postponed

12 August 2021 1	Al-Raed	1–0	Al-Fateh	Buraidah
19:20	R. Al-Ghamdi 45+3'; Salem (yellow card) 46'; Majrashi (yellow card) 50'; Al-Rehaili (yellow card) 88'	Report	Al-Yousef (yellow card) 90+2'	Stadium: King Abdullah Sport City Stadium; Attendance: 668; Referee: Majed Al-Shamrani

16 August 2021 2	Al-Ittihad	3–0	Al-Raed	Jeddah
20:50	Al-Muwallad 7' (pen.); Hegazi 15'; Romarinho 42'	Report		Stadium: King Abdullah Sports City; Attendance: 23,199; Referee: Sami Al-Jires

25 August 2021 3	Al-Raed	2–0	Al-Hazem	Buraidah
19:05	R. Al-Ghamdi 45+3'; Al Saeed 47' (o.g.); El Berkaoui (yellow card) 57'; Eduardo (yellow card) 71'	Report	Moha (yellow card) 6'; Al-Dakheel (yellow card) 50'; Al-Aazmi (yellow card) 74'; John (yellow card) 89'	Stadium: King Abdullah Sport City Stadium; Attendance: 1,078; Referee: Abdullah Al-Shehri

12 September 2021 4	Al-Ettifaq	2–2	Al-Raed	Khobar
18:30	Quaison 14'; Al-Rubaie (yellow card) 27'; Kiss 65'; Al-Dossari (yellow card) 90+4'	Report	R. Al-Ghamdi (yellow card) 11'; El Berkaoui 23'; Al-Zain 52'; Fouzair (yellow card) 90+2'	Stadium: Prince Saud bin Jalawi Stadium; Attendance: 3,485; Referee: Mohammed Al-Qarni

17 September 2021 5	Al-Taawoun	3–5	Al-Raed	Buraidah
18:45	Manoel (yellow card) 6'; Luvannor (yellow card) 14', (goal) 57'; Tawamba 52', 54'; Kadesh (yellow card) 75'	Report	Baalghyth (yellow card) 12'; El Berkaoui 28', 71', (yellow card) 29'; Al-Farhan (yellow card) 56'; R. Al-Ghamdi 64'; Al-Beshe 68'; Al-Mogren 88'; Al-Rehaili (yellow card) 89'	Stadium: King Abdullah Sport City Stadium; Attendance: 9,001; Referee: Khaled Salwi

25 September 2021 6	Al-Raed	1–1	Al-Faisaly	Buraidah
20:25	Al-Fahad (yellow card) 30'; El Berkaoui 81' (pen.)	Report	Tavares 15', (yellow card) 90+2'; Ismael (yellow card) 40'; Al-Kassar (yellow card) 60'; Al-Ahmed (yellow card) 72'; Kaabi (yellow card) 81'	Stadium: King Abdullah Sport City Stadium; Attendance: 4,917; Referee: Abdullah Al-Harbi

30 September 2021 7	Al-Raed	0–2	Damac	Buraidah
18:30	René (yellow card) 49'; Al-Dossari (yellow card) 63'	Report	Al-Sahli (yellow card) 24'; Hawsawi (yellow card) 78'; Zelaya 86' (pen.); Augusto 90+5'	Stadium: King Abdullah Sport City Stadium; Attendance: 2,408; Referee: Khaled Al-Teris

16 October 2021 8	Al-Fayha	1–0	Al-Raed	Al Majma'ah
18:05	Lopes 35'; Ryller (yellow card) 90'	Report		Stadium: Al Majma'ah Sports City; Attendance: 3,792; Referee: Mohammed Al-Hoaish

23 October 2021 9	Al-Hilal	3–2	Al-Raed	Riyadh
20:00	Vietto 53', 61'; Kanno (yellow card) 66'; Jahfali (yellow card) 84'; Gomis 90+5'	Report	Al-Shehri 86'; Eder 88'; Al-Fahad (yellow card) 90+6'	Stadium: Prince Faisal bin Fahd Stadium; Attendance: 12,305; Referee: Artur Soares Dias (Portugal)

29 October 2021 10	Al-Raed	1–0	Al-Batin	Buraidah
18:05	Salem (yellow card) 55'; René (yellow card) 84'; El Berkaoui 90+3' (pen.)	Report	Al-Alawi (yellow card) 85'; Maurício (yellow card) 90+1'	Stadium: King Abdullah Sport City Stadium; Attendance: 1,454; Referee: Raed Al-Zahrani

3 November 2021 11	Al-Raed	4–0	Al-Tai	Buraidah
18:00	René 26'; Eder 47', 58'; El Berkaoui 54'	Report	Al-Thani (yellow card) 84'	Stadium: King Abdullah Sport City Stadium; Attendance: 2,362; Referee: Khaled Salwi

20 November 2021 12	Al-Nassr	2–2	Al-Raed	Riyadh
19:40	Talisca 24'; Lajami 45+1'	Report	El Berkaoui 5'; Eder 38'	Stadium: Mrsool Park; Attendance: 3,630; Referee: Bastian Dankert (Germany)

25 November 2021 13	Al-Shabab	3–0	Al-Raed	Riyadh
19:40	Al-Harbi 19'; Sharahili (yellow card) 21'; Lichnovsky (yellow card) 52'; Banega 55'; Carlos 73'	Report	Al-Farhan (yellow card) 35'; Eduardo (yellow card) 57'	Stadium: King Fahd International Stadium; Attendance: 3,405; Referee: Majed Al-Shamrani

27 December 2021 14	Al-Raed	1–0	Al-Ahli	Buraidah
15:20	Al-Zain 17'; Al-Farhan (yellow card) 33'; Baalghyth (yellow card) 39'; Eduardo (yellow card) 64'; Eder (yellow card) 65'	Report	Al-Asmari (yellow card) 10'; Ghareeb (yellow card) 61'	Stadium: King Abdullah Sport City Stadium; Attendance: 1,759; Referee: Khaled Al-Teris

1 January 2022 15	Abha	1–0	Al-Raed	Abha
15:45	te Vrede (yellow card) 13'; René 62' (o.g.); Bguir (yellow card) 80'; Matić (yellow card) 90+5'	Report	Al-Harbi (yellow card) 84'; Al-Qahtani (yellow card) 90+5'	Stadium: Prince Sultan bin Abdul Aziz Stadium; Attendance: 141; Referee: Mohammed Al-Esmaiel

8 January 2022 16	Al-Fateh	2–3	Al-Raed	Al-Hasa
17:45	Al-Buraikan (yellow card) 45+2'; Santini 48'; Al-Daheem (yellow card) 57' (yellow-red card) 75'; Al-Zaqaan (yellow card) 76'; Cueva (yellow card) 83', (goal) 90+6'	Report	El Berkaoui 35' (pen.), 88'; René (yellow card) 64'; Fouzair 77' (pen.); Al-Harbi (yellow card) 79'	Stadium: Prince Abdullah bin Jalawi Stadium; Attendance: 7,198; Referee: István Kovács (Romania)

14 January 2022 17	Al-Raed	1–2	Al-Ittihad	Buraidah
15:35	Eder (yellow card) 56'; Fouzair 90+2'	Report	Al-Shamrani (yellow card) 9'; Hamdallah 21'; Hawsawi (yellow card) 45'; Al-Muwallad (yellow card) 77'; Romarinho 85' (pen.)	Stadium: King Abdullah Sport City Stadium; Attendance: 8,578; Referee: Sultan Sughayyir

22 January 2022 18	Al-Hazem	2–0	Al-Raed	Ar Rass
18:20	John 6'; Al-Sahlawi (yellow card) 61'; Abdullah S. (yellow card) 66'; Zerhouni 89'	Report	René (yellow card) 13'	Stadium: Al-Hazem Club Stadium; Attendance: 2,009; Referee: Majed Al-Shamrani

5 February 2022 19	Al-Raed	1–1	Al-Ettifaq	Buraidah
15:50	Fouzair (yellow card) 36'; El Berkaoui 75'; Al-Fahad (yellow card) 90+2'	Report	Mahnashi (yellow card) 39'; Al-Kuwaykibi (red card) 48'; Kiss 90+4' (pen.); Ghazi (yellow card) 90+7'	Stadium: King Abdullah Sport City Stadium; Attendance: 2,770; Referee: Mohammed Al-Qarni

12 February 2022 20	Al-Raed	0–3	Al-Taawoun	Buraidah
18:30	Fouzair (yellow card) 66'; René (yellow card) 81'	Report	Hawsawi (yellow card) 38'; Fathi 67', 84'; Tawamba 71'	Stadium: King Abdullah Sport City Stadium; Attendance: 7,551; Referee: Ilgiz Tantashev (Uzbekistan)

18 February 2022 21	Al-Faisaly	0–0	Al-Raed	Al Majma'ah
18:30		Report	Al-Khathlan (yellow card) 61'	Stadium: Al Majma'ah Sports City; Attendance: 3,475; Referee: Mohammed Al-Esmaiel

26 February 2022 22	Damac	3–2	Al-Raed	Abha
16:15	Hamzi 27'; Antolić (red card) 30'; Soudani 39'; Vittor (yellow card) 45+5', (goal) 90+5'; Chafaï (yellow card) 45+6'	Report	Eder 36'; Al-Khathlan (yellow card) 45+5'; El Berkaoui 46'; René (red card) 90+4'	Stadium: Prince Sultan bin Abdul Aziz Stadium; Attendance: 3,263; Referee: Abdullah Al-Awedan

5 March 2022 23	Al-Raed	1–0	Al-Fayha	Buraidah
18:45	Eder 21'; Fouzair (yellow card) 56'; Atsu (yellow card) 72'; El Berkaoui (yellow card) 83'; Al-Rehaili (yellow card) 90+4'	Report	Tachtsidis (yellow card) 76'; Al-Rashidi (yellow card) 88'	Stadium: King Abdullah Sport City Stadium; Attendance: 5,896; Referee: Sultan Al-Okairy

13 March 2022 24	Al-Raed	0–1	Al-Hilal	Buraidah
18:50	Al-Rehaili (yellow card) 82'	Report	Marega 89'	Stadium: King Abdullah Sport City Stadium; Attendance: 20,082; Referee: Sultan Al-Harbi

19 March 2022 25	Al-Batin	2–0	Al-Raed	Hafar al-Batin
18:45	Rayhi (yellow card) 41', (goal) 90+6'; Naji (yellow card) 60'; Sami (yellow card) 62'; Abreu 69' (pen.)	Report		Stadium: Al-Batin Club Stadium; Attendance: 4,185; Referee: Andris Treimanis (Latvia)

7 May 2022 26	Al-Tai	2–2	Al-Raed	Ha'il
20:50	Ali (yellow card) 16'; Sayoud 34', (yellow card) 45'; Figueroa 45+3', (yellow card) 59'; Fai (yellow card) 90+2'	Report	Al-Zain 18'; R. Al-Ghamdi 75'	Stadium: Prince Abdul Aziz bin Musa'ed Stadium; Attendance: 5,993; Referee: Georgi Kabakov (Bulgaria)

21 May 2022 27	Al-Raed	0–3	Al-Nassr	Buraidah
21:00		Report	S. Al-Ghanam 8'; Al-Najei (yellow card) 66'; Talisca 75', (yellow card) 86'; Martínez 89'	Stadium: King Abdullah Sport City Stadium; Attendance: 16,168; Referee: Mohammed Al-Esmaiel

27 May 2022 28	Al-Raed	0–2	Al-Shabab	Buraidah
21:00	René (yellow card) 45+2'	Report	Carlos 4', 31'	Stadium: King Abdullah Sport City Stadium; Attendance: 7,980; Referee: Shukri Al-Hanfoushi

23 June 2022 29	Al-Ahli	1–3	Al-Raed	Jeddah
21:00	Al-Mogahwi (yellow card) 83'; Kom (yellow card) 90'; Eduardo 90+5'	Report	Baalghyth 43'; Fouzair (yellow card) 45'; R. Al-Ghamdi 60'; El Berkaoui 83'; Khamis (yellow card) 88'	Stadium: Prince Abdullah Al-Faisal Stadium; Attendance: 36,079; Referee: Facundo Tello (Argentina)

27 June 2022 30	Al-Raed	1–0	Abha	Buraidah
21:00	El Berkaoui 21'; Al-Qahtani (yellow card) 87'; Al-Farhan (yellow card) 90+3'	Report	Ifa (yellow card) 69'	Stadium: King Abdullah Sport City Stadium; Attendance: 6,524; Referee: Majed Al-Shamrani

=== King Cup ===
All times are local, AST (UTC+3).

20 December 2021 Round of 16	Al-Hilal	2–0	Al-Raed	Riyadh
20:00	Vietto 5'; Al-Shehri (yellow card) 6'; Carrillo 75'	Report	Fouzair (yellow card) 8'; Salem (yellow card) 15' (yellow-red card) 77'; Al-Farhan (yellow card) 77'	Stadium: King Fahd International Stadium; Referee: Sandro Schärer (Switzerland)

== Statistics ==
=== Appearances ===
Last updated on 27 June 2022.

No.	Pos	Nat	Player	Total		Pro League		King Cup	
No.	Pos	Nat	Player	Apps	Goals	Apps	Goals	Apps	Goals
Goalkeepers
23	GK	(Saudi Arabia) KSA	Ahmed Al-Rehaili	18	0	17	0	1	0
33	GK	(Saudi Arabia) KSA	Mutlaq Al-Hurayji	0	0	0	0	0	0
50	GK	(Saudi Arabia) KSA	Meshari Sanyoor	0	0	0	0	0	0
Defenders
4	DF	(Saudi Arabia) KSA	Khaled Al-Khathlan	17	0	12+4	0	1	0
12	DF	(Saudi Arabia) KSA	Mohammed Salem	30	0	27+2	0	1	0
13	DF	(Saudi Arabia) KSA	Abdullah Al-Shanqiti	10	0	3+7	0	0	0
19	DF	(Saudi Arabia) KSA	Abdullah Al-Fahad	26	0	15+10	0	1	0
21	DF	(Saudi Arabia) KSA	Aqeel Baalghyth	18	1	15+2	1	1	0
25	DF	(Brazil) BRA	René Santos	26	1	25	1	1	0
31	DF	(Saudi Arabia) KSA	Mansoor Al-Harbi	18	0	12+6	0	0	0
32	DF	(Saudi Arabia) KSA	Mohammed Al-Dossari	21	0	16+5	0	0	0
40	DF	(Saudi Arabia) KSA	Muteb Al-Mutlaq	1	0	0+1	0	0	0
Midfielders
3	MF	(Ghana) GHA	Christian Atsu	8	0	4+4	0	0	0
5	MF	(Brazil) BRA	Eduardo Henrique	30	0	28+1	0	1	0
6	MF	(Saudi Arabia) KSA	Abdullah Majrashi	12	0	4+7	0	0+1	0
8	MF	(Saudi Arabia) KSA	Yahya Al-Shehri	20	1	3+16	1	0+1	0
10	MF	(Morocco) MAR	Mohamed Fouzair	25	2	19+5	2	1	0
18	MF	(Saudi Arabia) KSA	Naif Hazazi	4	0	0+4	0	0	0
27	MF	(Saudi Arabia) KSA	Awadh Khamis	8	0	4+4	0	0	0
35	MF	(Saudi Arabia) KSA	Mansor Al-Beshe	13	1	4+9	1	0	0
44	MF	(Saudi Arabia) KSA	Sultan Al-Farhan	31	0	29+1	0	1	0
45	MF	(Saudi Arabia) KSA	Yahya Sunbul	4	0	1+3	0	0	0
49	MF	(Saudi Arabia) KSA	Ahmed Al-Zain	24	3	21+2	3	0+1	0
74	MF	(Saudi Arabia) KSA	Abdulmohsen Al-Qahtani	12	0	5+6	0	0+1	0
Forwards
9	FW	(Saudi Arabia) KSA	Raed Al-Ghamdi	21	5	9+12	5	0	0
11	FW	(Morocco) MAR	Karim El Berkaoui	27	13	22+4	13	1	0
17	FW	(Portugal) POR	Eder	23	6	19+3	6	1	0
20	FW	(Saudi Arabia) KSA	Rakan Al-Dossari	0	0	0	0	0	0
47	FW	(Saudi Arabia) KSA	Abdulrahman Al-Ghamdi	2	0	0+2	0	0	0
Players sent out on loan this season
2	DF	(Saudi Arabia) KSA	Fahad Al-Suyayfy	0	0	0	0	0	0
Player who made an appearance this season but have left the club
7	MF	(Saudi Arabia) KSA	Mohammed Al-Sahli	0	0	0	0	0	0
14	MF	(Saudi Arabia) KSA	Abdullah Al-Mogren	7	1	3+4	1	0	0
15	MF	(Saudi Arabia) KSA	Jaber Issa	0	0	0	0	0	0
70	MF	(Saudi Arabia) KSA	Hussain Al-Hajoj	0	0	0	0	0	0
99	GK	(Spain) ESP	Iago Herrerín	13	0	13	0	0	0

=== Goalscorers ===
Rank	No.	Pos	Nat	Name	Pro League	King Cup	Total
1	11	FW	(Morocco)	Karim El Berkaoui	13	0	13
2	17	FW	(Portugal)	Eder	6	0	6
3	9	FW	(Saudi Arabia)	Raed Al-Ghamdi	5	0	5
4	49	MF	(Saudi Arabia)	Ahmed Al-Zain	3	0	3
5	10	MF	(Morocco)	Mohamed Fouzair	2	0	2
6	8	MF	(Saudi Arabia)	Yahya Al-Shehri	1	0	1
6	14	MF	(Saudi Arabia)	Abdullah Al-Mogren	1	0	1
6	21	DF	(Saudi Arabia)	Aqeel Baalghyth	1	0	1
6	25	DF	(Brazil)	René Santos	1	0	1
6	35	MF	(Saudi Arabia)	Mansor Al-Beshe	1	0	1
Own goal					1	0	1
Total					35	0	35

Last Updated: 27 June 2022

=== Assists ===
Rank	No.	Pos	Nat	Name	Pro League	King Cup	Total
1	49	MF	(Saudi Arabia)	Ahmed Al-Zain	6	0	6
2	10	MF	(Morocco)	Mohamed Fouzair	4	0	4
3	8	MF	(Saudi Arabia)	Yahya Al-Shehri	2	0	2
3	11	FW	(Morocco)	Karim El Berkaoui	2	0	2
5	3	MF	(Ghana)	Christian Atsu	1	0	1
5	4	DF	(Saudi Arabia)	Khaled Al-Khathlan	1	0	1
5	9	FW	(Saudi Arabia)	Raed Al-Ghamdi	1	0	1
5	14	MF	(Saudi Arabia)	Abdullah Al-Mogren	1	0	1
5	17	FW	(Portugal)	Eder	1	0	1
5	27	MF	(Saudi Arabia)	Awadh Khamis	1	0	1
5	35	MF	(Saudi Arabia)	Mansor Al-Beshe	1	0	1
5	99	GK	(Spain)	Iago Herrerín	1	0	1
Total					22	0	22

Last Updated: 27 June 2022

=== Clean sheets ===
Rank	No.	Pos	Nat	Name	Pro League	King Cup	Total
1	23	GK	(Saudi Arabia)	Ahmed Al-Rehaili	6	0	6
2	99	GK	(Spain)	Iago Herrerín	2	0	2
Total					8	0	8

Last Updated: 27 June 2022
