= 2022–23 Al-Raed FC season =

Al-Raed
2022–23 season
- Chairman: Fahad Al-Motawa'a
- Manager: Marius Șumudică
- Stadium: King Abdullah Sport City Stadium
- SPL: 10th
- King Cup: Round of 16 (knocked out by Al-Batin)
- Top goalscorer: League: Mohamed Fouzair (11 goals); All: Mohamed Fouzair (11 goals)
- Highest home attendance: 19,942 (vs. Al-Hilal, 10 January 2023)
- Lowest home attendance: 1,423 (vs. Abha, 10 February 2023)
- Average home league attendance: 5,974
- All statistics correct as of 31 May 2023.

The 2022–23 season was Al-Raed's 69th year in their history and 15th consecutive season in the Pro League. The club participated in the Pro League and the King Cup.

The season covers the period from 1 July 2022 to 30 June 2023.

== Players ==
=== Squad information ===
As of 1 February 2023

Note: Flags indicate national team as defined under FIFA eligibility rules; some limited exceptions apply. Players may hold more than one non-FIFA nationality.

No.	Pos.	Nation	Player
1	GK	ROU	Silviu Lung Jr.
4	DF	KSA	Khaled Al-Khathlan
6	MF	KSA	Abdullah Majrashi
7	MF	KSA	Abdulmalek Al-Shammeri
8	MF	KSA	Yahya Al-Shehri
9	FW	KSA	Raed Al-Ghamdi
10	MF	MAR	Mohamed Fouzair
11	FW	MAR	Karim El Berkaoui
12	DF	KSA	Mohammed Salem
14	MF	KSA	Mansor Al-Beshe
15	MF	KSA	Omar Al-Kreidis
16	MF	KSA	Abdulaziz Al-Jebreen
17	FW	CPV	Júlio Tavares
18	MF	KSA	Naif Hazazi
19	DF	KSA	Abdullah Al-Fahad
20	FW	KSA	Rakan Al-Dossari

No.	Pos.	Nation	Player
23	GK	KSA	Ahmed Al-Rehaili
27	MF	KSA	Awadh Khamis
28	DF	BRA	Pablo Santos
32	DF	KSA	Mohammed Al-Dossari
33	GK	KSA	Mutlaq Al-Hurayji
41	FW	KSA	Nawaf Al-Sahli
42	FW	KSA	Anas Al-Zahrani
44	MF	KSA	Sultan Al-Farhan (captain)
45	MF	KSA	Yahya Sunbul
47	FW	KSA	Abdulrahman Al-Ghamdi
50	GK	KSA	Mashari Sanyoor
66	DF	KSA	Abdullah Al-Shaflut
74	MF	KSA	Abdulmohsen Al-Qahtani
82	MF	ROU	Alexandru Mitriță (on loan from New York City)
88	MF	CRO	Damjan Đoković
94	DF	KSA	Mubarak Al-Rajeh

=== Out on loan ===
Note: Flags indicate national team as defined under FIFA eligibility rules; some limited exceptions apply. Players may hold more than one non-FIFA nationality.

No.	Pos.	Nation	Player
77	FW	KSA	Rayan Al-Marshoud (at Al-Rayyan until 30 June 2023)

== Transfers and loans ==
=== Transfers in ===
Entry date	Position	No.	Player	From club	Fee	Ref.
30 June 2022	DF	2	(Saudi Arabia) Fahad Al-Suyayfy	(Saudi Arabia) Al-Jandal	End of loan	
30 June 2022	MF	16	(Saudi Arabia) Bander Faleh	(Saudi Arabia) Al-Shoulla	End of loan	
30 June 2022	FW	77	(Saudi Arabia) Rayan Al-Marshoud	(Saudi Arabia) Al-Arabi	End of loan	
23 July 2022	MF	35	(Saudi Arabia) Mansor Al-Beshe	(Saudi Arabia) Al-Hilal	Free	
25 July 2022	GK	1	(Romania) Silviu Lung Jr.	(Turkey) Kayserispor	Free	
25 July 2022	DF	28	(Brazil) Pablo Santos	(Portugal) Braga	Free	
25 July 2022	MF	88	(Croatia) Damjan Đoković	(Turkey) Çaykur Rizespor	Free	
25 July 2022	FW	17	(Cape Verde) Júlio Tavares	(Saudi Arabia) Al-Faisaly	Free	
31 August 2022	MF	7	(Saudi Arabia) Abdulmalek Al-Shammeri	(Saudi Arabia) Al-Fayha	Free	
31 August 2022	MF	16	(Saudi Arabia) Abdulaziz Al-Jebreen	(Saudi Arabia) Al-Batin	Free	

=== Loans in ===
Start date	End date	Position	No.	Player	From club	Fee	Ref.
25 July 2022	End of season	MF	82	(Romania) Alexandru Mitriță	(United States) New York City	None	

=== Transfers out ===
Exit date	Position	No.	Player	To club	Fee	Ref.
30 June 2022	DF	13	(Saudi Arabia) Abdullah Al-Shanqiti	(Saudi Arabia) Al-Nassr	End of loan	
30 June 2022	MF	5	(Brazil) Eduardo Henrique	(Portugal) Sporting CP	End of loan	
30 June 2022	MF	35	(Saudi Arabia) Mansor Al-Beshe	(Saudi Arabia) Al-Hilal	End of loan	
1 July 2022	GK	–	(Saudi Arabia) Abdulbassit Hawsawi	(Saudi Arabia) Damac	Free	
1 July 2022	MF	49	(Saudi Arabia) Ahmed Al-Zain	(Saudi Arabia) Damac	Free	
7 July 2022	DF	40	(Saudi Arabia) Muteb Al-Mutlaq	(Saudi Arabia) Al-Shoulla	Free	
16 July 2022	MF	16	(Saudi Arabia) Bander Faleh	(Saudi Arabia) Al-Jabalain	Free	
25 July 2022	FW	17	(Portugal) Eder		Released	
6 August 2022	DF	2	(Saudi Arabia) Fahad Al-Suyayfy	(Saudi Arabia) Al-Shoulla	Free	
15 August 2022	GK	–	(Saudi Arabia) Ayman Al-Husayka'	(Saudi Arabia) Al-Qawarah	Free	
20 August 2022	MF	–	(Saudi Arabia) Ali Bakri	(Saudi Arabia) Al-Tuhami	Free	
24 August 2022	DF	21	(Saudi Arabia) Aqeel Baalghyth	(Saudi Arabia) Jeddah	Free	
7 September 2022	MF	3	(Ghana) Christian Atsu	(Turkey) Hatayspor	Free	
18 September 2022	FW	–	(Saudi Arabia) Ziyad Al-Qarait	(Saudi Arabia) Al-Saqer	Free	
6 October 2022	DF	–	(Saudi Arabia) Mohammed Krishan	(Saudi Arabia) Al-Qawarah	Free	
16 December 2022	DF	25	(Brazil) René Santos	(Portugal) Marítimo	Free	

=== Loans out ===
Start date	End date	Position	No.	Player	To club	Fee	Ref.
15 July 2022	End of season	FW	77	(Saudi Arabia) Rayan Al-Marshoud	(Saudi Arabia) Al-Rayyan	None	

== Pre-season ==
3 August 2022 Friendly	Al-Raed (Saudi Arabia)	3–1	(United Arab Emirates) Hatta	Kartepe, Turkey
18:00 TRT	R. Al-Ghamdi; El Berkaoui; Fouzair	Report

6 August 2022 Friendly	Al-Raed (Saudi Arabia)	2–0	(Kuwait) Al-Salmiya	Kartepe, Turkey
18:15 TRT	El Berkaoui 15'; Mitriță 57'	Report

9 August 2022 Friendly	Al-Raed (Saudi Arabia)	2–0	(Saudi Arabia) Al-Ahli	Kartepe, Turkey
18:00 TRT	Tavares 63'; Fouzair 89'	Report

12 August 2022 Friendly	Al-Raed (Saudi Arabia)	1–1	(Saudi Arabia) Al-Faisaly	Kartepe, Turkey
18:00 TRT	R. Al-Ghamdi 32'	Report	Fateh 90'

21 August 2022 Friendly	Al-Raed (Saudi Arabia)	2–1	(Saudi Arabia) Al-Nassr	Riyadh, Saudi Arabia
20:15 AST	Đoković 36'; Tavares 42'	Report	Talisca 71'	Stadium: Mrsool Park

== Competitions ==
=== Overview ===
Competition	Record							
Competition	G	W	D	L	GF	GA	GD	Win %
Pro League	30	9	7	14	41	49	−8	30.00
King Cup	1	0	0	1	0	1	−1	0.00
Total	31	9	7	15	41	50	−9	29.03

Updated to match played 31 May 2023
Source: Competitions

=== Pro League ===
==== League table ====
Pos	Team	Pld	W	D	L	GF	GA	GD	Pts	Qualification or relegation
8	Damac	30	9	9	12	33	43	−10	36	
9	Al-Tai	30	10	4	16	41	49	−8	34 (Note: Al-Tai finished ahead of Al-Raed on head-to-head points: Al-Tai: 4 pts, Al-Raed: 1 pts (Al-Raed 0–2 Al-Tai, Al-Tai 2–2 Al-Raed).)	
10	Al-Raed	30	9	7	14	41	49	−8	34	
11	Al-Fayha (Note: Al-Fayha qualified for the AFC Champions League group stage as the 2021–22 King Cup winners.)	30	8	9	13	31	43	−12	33 (Note: Al-Fayha finished ahead of Abha on head-to-head points: Al-Fayha: 4 pts, Abha: 1 pts (Abha 1–1 Al-Fayha, Al-Fayha 2–0 Abha).)	Qualified for the AFC Champions League group stage
12	Abha	30	10	3	17	33	52	−19	33	

Updated to match(es) played on 31 May 2023. Source: SPL
Rules for classification: 1) Points; 2) Head-to-head points; 3) Head-to-head goal difference; 4) Total goal difference; 5) Total goals scored; 6) Fair-play points (Note: Head-to-head record is used only after all the matches between the teams in question have been played).

==== Results summary ====
Overall								Home						Away					
Pld	W	D	L	GF	GA	GD	Pts	W	D	L	GF	GA	GD	W	D	L	GF	GA	GD
30	9	7	14	41	49	−8	34	5	3	7	23	25	−2	4	4	7	18	24	−6

Last updated: 31 May 2023.
Source: spl.com.sa

==== Results by round ====
Round	1	2	3	4	5	6	7	8	9	10	11	12	13	14	15	16	17	18	19	20	21	22	23	24	25	26	27	28	29	30
Ground	A	H	H	A	H	A	H	A	H	A	H	A	H	A	H	H	A	A	H	A	H	A	H	A	H	A	H	A	H	A
Result	L	W	L	W	W	L	L	L	L	W	L	W	L	L	D	W	D	D	L	W	D	D	L	L	W	L	W	D	D	L
Position	9	8	10	8	7	8	10	11	11	11	11	11	11	11	12	12	10	10	12	9	9	9	10	11	11	11	10	9	9	10

Updated to match(es) played on 31 May 2023. Source: spl.com.sa
A = Away; H = Home; W = Win; D = Draw; L = Loss

==== Matches ====
All times are local, AST (UTC+3).

Win Draw Loss Postponed

27 August 2022 1	Abha	2–1	Al-Raed	Abha
21:00	Adam 51'; Bguir 60'; Meziani (yellow card) 80'; Sharahili (yellow card) 87'	Report	Salem 34'; R. Santos (yellow card) 76'	Stadium: Prince Sultan bin Abdul Aziz Stadium; Attendance: 932; Referee: Sultan Al-Harbi

1 September 2022 2	Al-Raed	1–0	Al-Wehda	Buraidah
19:00	Al-Fahad (yellow card) 58'; Mitriță 62'; René (red card) 90+1'	Report	Al-Jayzani (yellow card) 14'; Botía (yellow card) 34'; Bakshween (yellow card) 90+9'	Stadium: King Abdullah Sport City Stadium; Attendance: 3,081; Referee: Majed Al-Shamrani

9 September 2022 3	Al-Raed	0–1	Al-Ittihad	Buraidah
21:00	Al-Farhan (yellow card) 74'; Khamis (yellow card) 89'	Report	Al-Shamrani (yellow card) 37'; Hegazi (yellow card) 40', (goal) 66'; Hamed (yellow card) 90+1'	Stadium: King Abdullah Sport City Stadium; Attendance: 10,856; Referee: Andrés Matonte (Uruguay)

15 September 2022 4	Al-Ettifaq	1–2	Al-Raed	Dammam
21:00	Quaison 40'; Velkovski (yellow card) 45+1'; Hazazi (yellow card) 49'	Report	El Berkaoui 45+2'; Fouzair (yellow card) 55', (goal) 86'	Stadium: Prince Mohamed bin Fahd Stadium; Attendance: 5,731; Referee: Abdulaziz Al-Shehri

1 October 2022 5	Al-Raed	2–1	Al-Adalah	Buraidah
18:30	El Berkaoui 63'; Tavares 71'	Report	Edson (yellow card) 28'; Palacios 35'; Al-Hurib (yellow card) 71'	Stadium: King Abdullah Sport City Stadium; Attendance: 4,309; Referee: Sultan Al-Harbi

6 October 2022 6	Al-Shabab	1–0	Al-Raed	Riyadh
21:00	Salem 22' (o.g.); Santos (yellow card) 51'; Al-Sqoor (yellow card) 86'	Report	Pablo (yellow card) 83'	Stadium: Prince Faisal bin Fahd Stadium; Attendance: 7,458; Referee: Mohammed Al-Esmaiel

10 October 2022 7	Al-Raed	0–2	Al-Tai	Buraidah
18:15	Al-Fahad (yellow card) 57'; Khamis (yellow card) 90+5'	Report	Mbenza 18'; Qassem (yellow card) 27'; Sayoud 36'; Al-Harabi (red card) 45'	Stadium: King Abdullah Sport City Stadium; Attendance: 3,810; Referee: Abdullah Al-Shehri

15 October 2022 8	Al-Fateh	1–0	Al-Raed	Al-Hasa
20:30	Al-Buraikan 10'; Buhimed (red card) 45'; Saâdane (yellow card) 65'	Report	Al-Qahtani (yellow card) 52'; Al-Shammeri (yellow card) 89'	Stadium: Prince Abdullah bin Jalawi Stadium; Attendance: 11,972; Referee: Mamdouh Al Shahdan

16 December 2022 9	Al-Raed	1–4	Al-Nassr	Buraidah
18:00	Mitriță 28'; Al-Jebreen (yellow card) 31'; Al-Fahad (yellow card) 63'; El Berkaoui (yellow card) 70'	Report	Aboubakar 45+5'; Talisca 61', 73' (pen.), 89'	Stadium: King Abdullah Sport City Stadium; Attendance: 11,134; Referee: Sami Al-Jires

26 December 2022 10	Al-Batin	1–2	Al-Raed	Hafar al-Batin
15:30	Al-Mutairi (yellow card) 8'; Nasser (yellow card) 47'; Y. Al-Shammari 49'; Mamdouh (yellow card) 89'	Report	El Berkaoui 31'; M. Al-Dossari (yellow card) 42'; Mitriță 57'	Stadium: Al-Batin Club Stadium; Attendance: 3,194; Referee: Mamdouh Al Shahdan

31 December 2022 11	Al-Raed	2–3	Al-Taawoun	Buraidah
18:00	Tavares 45+4'; Fouzair 90+4'	Report	Kaku 5'; Medrán (yellow card) 24'; Naldo 40'; Al-Rashidi (yellow card) 56'; Tawamba 84'; Kadesh (yellow card) 90+2'; Al-Mutairi (yellow card) 90+5'	Stadium: King Abdullah Sport City Stadium; Attendance: 10,998; Referee: Majed Al-Shamrani

5 January 2023 12	Damac	1–2	Al-Raed	Abha
15:30	Maher (yellow card) 45'; Chafaï 82'; Al-Shamrani (yellow card) 89'; Al-Ammar (yellow card) 90+2'	Report	El Berkaoui 7', (yellow card) 87'; Tavares 19'; M. Al-Dossari (yellow card) 27'; Al-Beshe (yellow card) 90+3'	Stadium: Prince Sultan bin Abdul Aziz Stadium; Attendance: 388; Referee: Mohammed Al-Harbi

10 January 2023 15	Al-Raed	1–1	Al-Hilal	Buraidah
20:30	Al-Beshe (yellow card) 62'; Sunbul 76'; Salem (yellow card) 89'; Al-Rehaili (yellow card) 90+1'	Report	Al-Yami 24'; Cuéllar (yellow card) 61'	Stadium: King Abdullah Sport City Stadium; Attendance: 19,942; Referee: Sami Al-Jires

14 January 2023 13	Al-Raed	2–4	Al-Fayha	Buraidah
18:00	Fouzair 36'; Salem (yellow card) 40'; Đoković (yellow card) 41'; Mitriță 45+3', (yellow card) 90'	Report	Ruiz 41' (pen.); Pavkov 43'; Paulinho (yellow card) 44', (goal) 90+4'; Ryller 87'	Stadium: King Abdullah Sport City Stadium; Attendance: 1,667; Referee: Abdulsamad Bakri

20 January 2023 14	Al-Khaleej	3–0	Al-Raed	Dammam
15:30	Poko 31'; Al-Abdan (yellow card) 48'; Martins (yellow card) 49'; Al-Samiri 60'; Cikalleshi 89'	Report	Fouzair (yellow card) 19'	Stadium: Prince Mohamed bin Fahd Stadium; Attendance: 3,979; Referee: Mohammed Al-Harbi

10 February 2023 16	Al-Raed	3–1	Abha	Buraidah
16:00	Đoković 45+2'; Hazazi (yellow card) 59'; M. Al-Dossari (yellow card) 67'; Mitriță (yellow card) 78'; Fouzair 88', 90+13'; Al-Farhan (yellow card) 90+6'	Report	Al-Sadi 41'; Al-Amri (yellow card) 76'	Stadium: King Abdullah Sport City Stadium; Attendance: 1,423; Referee: Sultan Okairy

17 February 2023 17	Al-Wehda	2–2	Al-Raed	Mecca
20:30	Anselmo (yellow card) 23', (goal) 61'; Al Hejji 72'	Report	Tavares 34', 53'; Fouzair (yellow card) 44'	Stadium: King Abdul Aziz Stadium; Attendance: 889; Referee: Shukri Al-Hanfoush

23 February 2023 18	Al-Ittihad	0–0	Al-Raed	Jeddah
20:30	Sharahili (yellow card) 41'; Al-Saiari (yellow card) 90+1'	Report	Al-Farhan (yellow card) 21'; Sunbul (yellow card) 90+3'; Lung Jr. (yellow card) 90+6'	Stadium: King Abdullah Sports City; Attendance: 33,173; Referee: Sandro Schärer (Switzerland)

3 March 2023 19	Al-Raed	1–2	Al-Ettifaq	Buraidah
16:00	Fouzair 22' (pen.); Hazazi (yellow card) 90+6'	Report	Quaison (yellow card) 7', (goal) 45+7'; Al-Mowalad (yellow card) 17'; Hawsawi 90+3'	Stadium: King Abdullah Sport City Stadium; Attendance: 4,454; Referee: Abdullah Al-Kharboush

11 March 2023 20	Al-Adalah	0–3	Al-Raed	Al-Hasa
18:00	Godál (yellow card) 45+2'; Al-Oufi (yellow card) 45+5'; Al-Sultan (yellow card) 62' (yellow-red card) 63'; Al-Jamaan (yellow card) 85'	Report	Salem (yellow card) 42'; Fouzair 45+7', (yellow card) 56'; Tavares 86' (pen.); Mitriță (yellow card) 89'; Al-Beshe 90+7'	Stadium: Prince Abdullah bin Jalawi Stadium; Attendance: 15,073; Referee: Matej Jug (Slovenia)

18 March 2023 21	Al-Raed	2–2	Al-Shabab	Buraidah
20:30	Tavares 25'; Mitriță 37'; M. Al-Dossari (yellow card) 42'; Salem (yellow card) 90+4'	Report	Krychowiak 58'; Boupendza 75'	Stadium: King Abdullah Sport City Stadium; Attendance: 1,631; Referee: Khaled Al-Teris

5 April 2023 22	Al-Tai	2–2	Al-Raed	Ha'il
22:00	Mbenza 24', 32', (yellow card) 36'; Sayoud (yellow card) 90+4'	Report	Mitriță 8'; Fouzair 28'	Stadium: Prince Abdul Aziz bin Musa'ed Stadium; Attendance: 7,246; Referee: Shukri Al-Hanfoush

10 April 2023 23	Al-Raed	0–3	Al-Fateh	Buraidah
22:00	Al-Farhan (yellow card) 23'; Pablo (red card) 43'	Report	Al-Najdi (yellow card) 27'; Batna 37', 53'; Al-Buraikan 45+8'; Al-Jari (yellow card) 49'; Bendebka (yellow card) 77'	Stadium: King Abdullah Sport City Stadium; Attendance: 4,531; Referee: Sultan Al-Harbi

28 April 2023 24	Al-Nassr	4–0	Al-Raed	Riyadh
21:30	Ronaldo 4'; Al-Khaibari (yellow card) 24'; Ghareeb 55'; Masharipov (yellow card) 83'; Maran 90'; Al-Sulaiheem 90+4'	Report	El Berkaoui (yellow card) 40'	Stadium: Al-Awwal Park; Attendance: 12,087; Referee: Mohammed Al-Hoaish

2 May 2023 25	Al-Raed	3–1	Al-Batin	Buraidah
19:00	El Berkaoui 17' (pen.), 23', 28', (yellow card) 50'; Salem (yellow card) 45+4'; Fouzair (yellow card) 48'; Al-Dosari (yellow card) 82'	Report	Mudasiru (yellow card) 36'; Roa 39'; Lopez (yellow card) 45+1'	Stadium: King Abdullah Sport City Stadium; Attendance: 4,380; Referee: Majed Al-Shamrani

9 May 2023 26	Al-Taawoun	2–1	Al-Raed	Buraidah
19:00	Medrán (yellow card) 16', (goal) 45+1'; El Mahdioui (yellow card) 35'; Kaku 83' (pen.); Naldo (yellow card) 90+5'	Report	Fouzair (yellow card) 39'; Tavares 44'; Mitriță (yellow card) 54'; Al-Fahad (yellow card) 81'; Salem (yellow card) 81'; Al-Farhan (yellow card) 90'	Stadium: King Abdullah Sport City Stadium; Attendance: 12,907; Referee: Anastasios Sidiropoulos (Greece)

15 May 2023 27	Al-Raed	5–0	Damac	Buraidah
19:00	El Berkaoui 10', 85'; Fouzair 20' (pen.), 60', 90+4'; Al-Farhan (yellow card) 51'	Report	Hassoun (yellow card) 46'; Maher (yellow card) 50'	Stadium: King Abdullah Sport City Stadium; Attendance: 2,901; Referee: Shukri Al-Hanfoush

22 May 2023 28	Al-Fayha	1–1	Al-Raed	Al Majma'ah
19:00	Al-Rashidi (yellow card) 43'; Trajkovski 80'	Report	Đoković 24'; Salem (yellow card) 58'; Al-Farhan (yellow card) 69'; Al-Fahad (yellow card) 72'; Khamis (yellow card) 90+1'	Stadium: Al Majma'ah Sports City; Attendance: 3,820; Referee: Sultan Okairy

27 May 2023 29	Al-Raed	0–0	Al-Khaleej	Buraidah
21:00	Fouzair (yellow card) 13'; Salem (yellow card) 90+1'; Khamis (yellow card) 90+7'	Report		Stadium: King Abdullah Sport City Stadium; Attendance: 4,490; Referee: Abdullah Al-Kharboush

31 May 2023 30	Al-Hilal	3–2	Al-Raed	Riyadh
21:00	Al-Juwayr 18'; Al-Qahtani 36'; Otayf 80' (pen.)	Report	Al-Farhan (yellow card) 26'; Al-Fahad (yellow card) 79'; R. Al-Dossari 90'; Pablo 90+5'	Stadium: Prince Faisal bin Fahd Stadium; Attendance: 4,060; Referee: Raed Al-Zahrani

=== King Cup ===
All times are local, AST (UTC+3).

22 December 2022 Round of 16	Al-Batin	1–0	Al-Raed	Hafar al-Batin
15:30	Anwar (yellow card) 18'; Al-Shammari (yellow card) 24', (goal) 76'	Report	Al-Rajeh (yellow card) 74'	Stadium: Al-Batin Club Stadium; Referee: Abdullah Al-Shehri

== Statistics ==
=== Appearances ===
Last updated on 31 May 2023.

No.	Pos	Nat	Player	Total		Pro League		King Cup	
No.	Pos	Nat	Player	Apps	Goals	Apps	Goals	Apps	Goals
Goalkeepers
1	GK	(Romania) ROU	Silviu Lung Jr.	28	0	27	0	1	0
23	GK	(Saudi Arabia) KSA	Ahmed Al-Rehaili	3	0	3	0	0	0
33	GK	(Saudi Arabia) KSA	Mutlaq Al-Hurayji	0	0	0	0	0	0
50	GK	(Saudi Arabia) KSA	Meshari Sanyor	0	0	0	0	0	0
Defenders
4	DF	(Saudi Arabia) KSA	Khaled Al-Khathlan	10	0	6+3	0	1	0
12	DF	(Saudi Arabia) KSA	Mohammed Salem	28	1	28	1	0	0
19	DF	(Saudi Arabia) KSA	Abdullah Al-Fahad	22	0	18+3	0	1	0
28	DF	(Brazil) BRA	Pablo Santos	17	1	17	1	0	0
32	DF	(Saudi Arabia) KSA	Mohammed Al-Dossari	21	0	18+2	0	1	0
66	DF	(Saudi Arabia) KSA	Abdullah Al-Shaflut	0	0	0	0	0	0
94	DF	(Saudi Arabia) KSA	Mubarak Al-Rajeh	12	0	9+2	0	1	0
Midfielders
6	MF	(Saudi Arabia) KSA	Abdullah Majrashi	4	0	1+3	0	0	0
7	MF	(Saudi Arabia) KSA	Abdulmalek Al-Shammeri	8	0	2+6	0	0	0
8	MF	(Saudi Arabia) KSA	Yahya Al-Shehri	18	0	1+16	0	1	0
10	MF	(Morocco) MAR	Mohamed Fouzair	28	11	26+1	11	1	0
14	MF	(Saudi Arabia) KSA	Mansor Al-Beshe	21	1	15+5	1	0+1	0
15	MF	(Saudi Arabia) KSA	Omar Al-Kreidis	0	0	0	0	0	0
16	MF	(Saudi Arabia) KSA	Abdulaziz Al-Jebreen	7	0	5+2	0	0	0
18	MF	(Saudi Arabia) KSA	Naif Hazazi	8	0	3+4	0	1	0
27	MF	(Saudi Arabia) KSA	Awadh Khamis	27	0	27	0	0	0
44	MF	(Saudi Arabia) KSA	Sultan Al-Farhan	22	0	18+4	0	0	0
45	MF	(Saudi Arabia) KSA	Yahya Sunbul	17	1	6+11	1	0	0
74	MF	(Saudi Arabia) KSA	Abdulmohsen Al-Qahtani	3	0	0+3	0	0	0
82	MF	(Romania) ROU	Alexandru Mitriță	28	6	26+2	6	0	0
88	MF	(Croatia) CRO	Damjan Đoković	30	2	24+5	2	1	0
Forwards
9	FW	(Saudi Arabia) KSA	Raed Al-Ghamdi	19	0	3+15	0	0+1	0
11	FW	(Morocco) MAR	Karim El Berkaoui	22	9	19+2	9	1	0
17	FW	(Cape Verde) CPV	Júlio Tavares	28	8	27	8	1	0
20	FW	(Saudi Arabia) KSA	Rakan Al-Dossari	1	1	0+1	1	0	0
41	FW	(Saudi Arabia) KSA	Nawaf Al-Sahli	0	0	0	0	0	0
42	FW	(Saudi Arabia) KSA	Anas Al-Zahrani	0	0	0	0	0	0
Player who made an appearance this season but have left the club
25	DF	(Brazil) BRA	René Santos	2	0	1+1	0	0	0

=== Goalscorers ===
Rank	No.	Pos	Nat	Name	Pro League	King Cup	Total
1	10	MF	(Morocco)	Mohamed Fouzair	11	0	11
2	11	FW	(Morocco)	Karim El Berkaoui	9	0	9
3	17	FW	(Cape Verde)	Júlio Tavares	8	0	8
4	82	MF	(Romania)	Alexandru Mitriță	6	0	6
5	88	MF	(Croatia)	Damjan Đoković	2	0	2
6	12	DF	(Saudi Arabia)	Mohammed Salem	1	0	1
6	14	MF	(Saudi Arabia)	Mansor Al-Beshe	1	0	1
6	20	FW	(Saudi Arabia)	Rakan Al-Dossari	1	0	1
6	28	DF	(Brazil)	Pablo Santos	1	0	1
6	45	MF	(Saudi Arabia)	Yahya Sunbul	1	0	1
Own goal					0	0	0
Total					41	0	41

Last Updated: 31 May 2023

=== Assists ===
Rank	No.	Pos	Nat	Name	Pro League	King Cup	Total
1	10	MF	(Morocco)	Mohamed Fouzair	6	0	6
2	17	FW	(Cape Verde)	Júlio Tavares	5	0	5
3	11	FW	(Morocco)	Karim El Berkaoui	3	0	3
3	32	DF	(Saudi Arabia)	Mohammed Al-Dossari	3	0	3
5	28	DF	(Brazil)	Pablo Santos	2	0	2
6	8	MF	(Saudi Arabia)	Yahya Al-Shehri	1	0	1
6	9	FW	(Saudi Arabia)	Raed Al-Ghamdi	1	0	1
6	12	DF	(Saudi Arabia)	Mohammed Salem	1	0	1
6	44	MF	(Saudi Arabia)	Sultan Al-Farhan	1	0	1
6	45	MF	(Saudi Arabia)	Yahya Sunbul	1	0	1
6	82	MF	(Romania)	Alexandru Mitriță	1	0	1
6	88	MF	(Croatia)	Damjan Đoković	1	0	1
Total					26	0	26

Last Updated: 31 May 2023

=== Clean sheets ===
Rank	No.	Pos	Nat	Name	Pro League	King Cup	Total
1	1	GK	(Romania)	Silviu Lung Jr.	4	0	4
2	23	GK	(Saudi Arabia)	Ahmed Al-Rehaili	1	0	1
Total					5	0	5

Last Updated: 27 May 2023
