= 2019–20 Al-Raed FC season =

Al-Raed
2019–20 season
- President: Fahad Al-Motawa'a
- Manager: Besnik Hasi
- Stadium: King Abdullah Sport City Stadium
- SPL: 6th
- King Cup: Round of 16 (knocked out by Al-Wehda)
- Top goalscorer: League: Mohamed Fouzair (10); All: Mohamed Fouzair (10)
- Highest home attendance: 11,601 vs Al-Hilal (31 August 2019)
- Lowest home attendance: 1,408 vs Al-Ettifaq (21 December 2019)
- Average home league attendance: 4,955
Home colours	Away colours	Third colours
- All statistics correct as of 9 September 2019.

The 2019–20 season was Al-Raed's twelfth consecutive season in Pro League and their 66th year in existence. This season Al-Raed participated in the Pro League and King Cup.

The season covers the period from 1 July 2019 to 10 September 2020.

== Players ==
=== Squad information ===
As of 4 February 2020

Note: Flags indicate national team as defined under FIFA eligibility rules; some limited exceptions apply. Players may hold more than one non-FIFA nationality.

No.	Pos.	Nation	Player
2	DF	KSA	Mohammed Al-Amri
4	DF	KSA	Faisal Darisi (on loan from Al-Ahli)
5	MF	MAR	Jalal Daoudi
7	MF	KSA	Mohammed Al-Sahli
8	MF	CMR	Arnaud Djoum
9	FW	KSA	Raed Al-Ghamdi
10	MF	MAR	Mohamed Fouzair
11	FW	COL	Marco Pérez
13	GK	NGA	Abdulbassit Hawsawi
14	MF	KSA	Abdullah Al-Mogren
15	MF	KSA	Mohanad Al-Shudukhi
16	MF	KSA	Bander Faleh
17	DF	KSA	Mohammed Al-Shoraimi
18	MF	SYR	Jehad Al-Hussain
19	DF	KSA	Abdullah Al-Fahad

No.	Pos.	Nation	Player
21	DF	KSA	Mohammed Reeman
22	GK	KSA	Ahmed Al-Rehaili
23	MF	KSA	Abdullah Majrashi
27	GK	KSA	Khaled Al-Muqaitib
30	GK	ALG	Azzedine Doukha
32	DF	KSA	Mohammed Al-Dossari (on loan from Al-Hilal)
33	DF	KSA	Hussain Al-Showaish
40	DF	KSA	Muteb Al-Mutlaq
44	MF	KSA	Sultan Al-Farhan
47	MF	KSA	Ahmed Al-Zain
50	GK	KSA	Mashari Sanyoor
70	MF	KSA	Hussain Al-Hajoj
77	FW	KSA	Rayan Al-Marshod
92	DF	COL	Ezequiel Palomeque (on loan from Unión Española)

==== Out on loan ====
Note: Flags indicate national team as defined under FIFA eligibility rules; some limited exceptions apply. Players may hold more than one non-FIFA nationality.

No. / Pos. / Nation / Player; 11 / FW / KSA / Saleh Al-Shehri (at Al-Hilal until 20 September 2020)	No. / Pos. / Nation / Player; 98 / DF / KSA / Muhannad Al-Qaydhi (at Al-Bukiryah until 20 September 2020)

== Transfers and loans ==
=== Transfers in ===
Entry date	Position	No.	Player	From club	Fee	Ref.
30 June 2019	GK	–	(Saudi Arabia) Khaled Al-Muqaitib	(Saudi Arabia) Al-Qaisumah	End of loan	
30 June 2019	DF	24	(Saudi Arabia) Abdulrahman Al-Shammari	(Saudi Arabia) Al-Orobah	End of loan	
30 June 2019	FW	10	(Guinea) Ismaël Bangoura	(Saudi Arabia) Al-Batin	End of loan	
8 July 2019	MF	8	(Cameroon) Arnaud Djoum	(Scotland) Hearts	Free	
11 July 2019	MF	5	(Morocco) Jalal Daoudi	(Morocco) Hassania Agadir	Free	
12 July 2019	DF	21	(Saudi Arabia) Mohammed Reeman	(Saudi Arabia) Al-Ittihad	Free	
12 July 2019	DF	–	(Saudi Arabia) Omar Al-Owdah	(Saudi Arabia) Al-Hilal	Free	
16 July 2019	MF	7	(Saudi Arabia) Mohammed Al-Sahli	(Saudi Arabia) Al-Qaisumah	Free	
18 July 2019	MF	10	(Morocco) Mohamed Fouzair	(Saudi Arabia) Al-Nassr	$500,000	
26 July 2019	FW	9	(Saudi Arabia) Raed Al-Ghamdi	(Saudi Arabia) Al-Batin	Free	
28 July 2019	MF	47	(Saudi Arabia) Ahmed Al-Zain	(Saudi Arabia) Al-Ahli	$267,500	
29 July 2019	GK	22	(Saudi Arabia) Ahmed Al-Rehaili	(Saudi Arabia) Al-Ahli	Free	
18 August 2019	MF	23	(Saudi Arabia) Abdullah Majrashi	(Saudi Arabia) Al-Ahli	Undisclosed	
22 August 2019	MF	18	(Syria) Jehad Al-Hussain	(Saudi Arabia) Al-Taawoun	Free	
25 August 2019	DF	40	(Saudi Arabia) Muteb Al-Mutlaq	(Saudi Arabia) Al-Nassr	Undisclosed	
25 August 2019	FW	11	(Colombia) Marco Pérez	(Colombia) Deportes Tolima	Undisclosed	
1 February 2020	MF	70	(Saudi Arabia) Hussain Al-Hajoj	(Saudi Arabia) Al-Ittihad	Free	
4 February 2020	MF	16	(Saudi Arabia) Bander Faleh	(Saudi Arabia) Arar	Free	

=== Loans in ===
Start date	End date	Position	No.	Player	From club	Fee	Ref.
10 July 2019	End of season	DF	4	(Saudi Arabia) Faisal Darisi	(Saudi Arabia) Al-Ahli	None	
21 August 2019	End of season	DF	32	(Saudi Arabia) Mohammed Al-Dossari	(Saudi Arabia) Al-Hilal	None	
25 August 2019	End of season	DF	92	(Colombia) Ezequiel Palomeque	(Colombia) Unión Española	None	

=== Transfers out ===
Exit date	Position	No.	Player	To club	Fee	Ref.
30 June 2019	DF	12	(Saudi Arabia) Khalid Al-Ghamdi	(Saudi Arabia) Al-Nassr	End of loan	
30 June 2019	DF	40	(Saudi Arabia) Muteb Al-Mutlaq	(Saudi Arabia) Al-Nassr	End of loan	
30 June 2019	MF	27	(Morocco) Ahmad Hamoudan	(Morocco) Ittihad Tanger	End of loan	
30 June 2019	MF	41	(Saudi Arabia) Abdulrahman Al-Shanar	(Saudi Arabia) Al-Nassr	End of loan	
30 June 2019	FW	87	(Belgium) Ilombe Mboyo	(Belgium) Kortrijk	End of loan	
1 July 2019	GK	77	(Saudi Arabia) Abdullah Al-Shammeri	(Saudi Arabia) Al-Kawkab	Free	
1 July 2019	DF	4	(Saudi Arabia) Yahya Al-Musalem		Released	
1 July 2019	DF	17	(Saudi Arabia) Abdullah Al-Shamekh	(Saudi Arabia) Al-Shabab	Free	
17 July 2019	FW	9	(Saudi Arabia) Mazen Abo Shararah	(Saudi Arabia) Damac	Free	
23 July 2019	GK	91	(Saudi Arabia) Ahmed Al-Ghamdi	(Saudi Arabia) Ohod	Free	
23 July 2019	MF	80	(Brazil) Daniel Amora	(United Arab Emirates) Hatta	Free	
24 July 2019	FW	10	(Guinea) Ismaël Bangoura		Released	
25 July 2019	DF	24	(Saudi Arabia) Abdulrahman Al-Shammari	(Saudi Arabia) Al-Tai	Free	
29 July 2019	DF	66	(Egypt) Mohamed Atwa	(Egypt) Pyramids	Free	
31 July 2019	GK	31	(Algeria) Hicham Belkaroui	(Algeria) USM Alger	Free	
1 August 2019	MF	6	(Saudi Arabia) Yahya Otain	(Saudi Arabia) Al-Nahda	Free	
21 August 2019	DF	–	(Saudi Arabia) Omar Al-Owdah	(Saudi Arabia) Al-Batin	Free	
28 August 2019	MF	21	(Saudi Arabia) Badr Al-Sulaitin	(Saudi Arabia) Al-Adalah	Free	
1 September 2019	MF	16	(Saudi Arabia) Abdullah Al-Sobeai	(Saudi Arabia) Al-Khaleej	Free	
1 September 2019	MF	20	(Brazil) Kanu		Released	
18 October 2019	MF	7	(North Macedonia) Ferhan Hasani	(Finland) HJK	Free	
20 January 2020	MF	49	(Saudi Arabia) Sultan Al-Sawadi	(Saudi Arabia) Al-Wehda	Free	

=== Loans out ===
Start date	End date	Position	No.	Player	To club	Fee	Ref.
19 August 2019	End of season	DF	98	(Saudi Arabia) Muhannad Al-Qaydhi	(Saudi Arabia) Al-Bukiryah	None	
20 August 2019	End of season	FW	11	(Saudi Arabia) Saleh Al-Shehri	(Saudi Arabia) Al-Hilal	$535,000	

== Competitions ==
=== Overview ===
Competition	Record							
Competition	G	W	D	L	GF	GA	GD	Win %
Pro League	30	13	7	10	41	50	−9	43.33
King Cup	3	2	1	0	5	1	+4	66.67
Total	33	15	8	10	46	51	−5	45.45

Updated to match played 9 September 2020
Source: Competitions

=== Pro League ===
==== League table ====
Pos	Team	Pld	W	D	L	GF	GA	GD	Pts	Qualification or relegation
4	Al-Wehda	30	16	1	13	45	40	+5	49	Qualification for AFC Champions League play-off round
5	Al-Faisaly	30	14	6	10	41	36	+5	48	
6	Al-Raed	30	13	7	10	41	50	−9	46	
7	Al-Shabab	30	12	7	11	38	37	+1	43	
8	Al-Ettifaq	30	13	3	14	46	38	+8	42	

Updated to match(es) played on 9 September 2020. Source: spl.com
Rules for classification: 1) Points; 2) Head-to-head points; 3) Head-to-head goal difference; 4) Total goal difference; 5) Total goals scored; 6) Fair-play points (Note: Head-to-head record is used only after all the matches between the teams in question have been played).

==== Results summary ====
Overall								Home						Away					
Pld	W	D	L	GF	GA	GD	Pts	W	D	L	GF	GA	GD	W	D	L	GF	GA	GD
30	13	7	10	41	50	−9	46	9	2	4	23	21	+2	4	5	6	18	29	−11

Last updated: 9 September 2020.
Source: spl.sa

==== Results by round ====
Round	1	2	3	4	5	6	7	8	9	10	11	12	13	14	15	16	17	18	19	20	21	22	23	24	25	26	27	28	29	30
Ground	A	H	A	H	H	A	H	A	H	A	A	H	H	A	H	H	A	H	A	A	H	A	H	A	H	H	A	A	H	A
Result	L	L	D	L	W	D	L	W	W	W	W	W	W	W	L	D	L	W	D	L	D	L	W	D	W	W	L	D	W	L
Position	14	16	14	15	14	13	14	13	9	10	8	8	5	4	6	6	7	5	5	6	6	7	6	7	6	6	6	6	5	6

Updated to match(es) played on 9 September 2022. Source: spl.com.sa
A = Away; H = Home; W = Win; D = Draw; L = Loss

==== Matches ====
All times are local, AST (UTC+3).

Win Draw Loss Postponed

23 August 2019 1	Al-Ittihad	3–1	Al-Raed	Jeddah
20:50	Prijović 11' (pen.); Romarinho 56', 90+5'; Abdulhamid (yellow card) 90+3'	Report	Al-Sahali 29'; Al-Zain (yellow card) 84'	Stadium: King Abdullah Sports City; Attendance: 31,781; Referee: Svein Oddvar Moen (Norway)

31 August 2019 2	Al-Raed	0–5	Al-Hilal	Buraidah
19:05	Fouzair (yellow card) 20'; Al-Farhan (yellow card) 37'	Report	Kharbin 6', 80'; Al-Faraj (yellow card) 32', (goal) 44'; Gomis 59'; Carlos Eduardo 67'	Stadium: King Abdullah Sport City Stadium; Attendance: 11,601; Referee: Damir Skomina (Slovenia)

14 September 2019 3	Abha	1–1	Al-Raed	Abha
18:50	Atouchi 26'; Gabriel (yellow card) 53'; Bguir (yellow card) 67'; Al Abbas (yellow card) 74'	Report	Daoudi 22' (pen.), (yellow card) 62'; Palomeque (yellow card) 36'	Stadium: Prince Sultan bin Abdul Aziz Stadium; Attendance: 1,222; Referee: André Narciso (Portugal)

28 September 2019 5	Al-Raed	2–0	Al-Fayha	Buraidah
20:15	Pérez 20'; Fouzair (yellow card) 22'; Palomeque (yellow card) 23'; Doukha (yellow card) 58'; Al-Zain 61'	Report	Owusu (yellow card) 45+1'; Neto (yellow card) 50'; Ba Masoud (yellow card) 88'; Arsénio (red card) 90+1'	Stadium: King Abdullah Sport City Stadium; Attendance: 3,193; Referee: Kevin Blom (Netherlands)

4 October 2019 6	Al-Fateh	2–2	Al-Raed	Al-Hasa
18:05	Al-Saâdane (yellow card) 21' te Vrede 34'; Al-Zaqaan 41', (yellow card) 78'; Koval (yellow card) 90'	Report	Pérez 29'; Djoum (yellow card) 43'; Fouzair 90+1'	Stadium: Prince Abdullah bin Jalawi Stadium; Attendance: 7,123; Referee: Jorge Sousa (Portugal)

19 October 2019 7	Al-Raed	0–2	Al-Nassr	Buraidah
18:10	Daoudi (yellow card) 13'; Al-Amri (yellow card) 45'; Djoum (yellow card) 51'; Al-Farhan (yellow card) 63'; Doukha (yellow card) 86'	Report	Hamdallah 18'; Ali (yellow card) 44'; Maicon (yellow card) 65'; Petros (yellow card) 70'; Amrabat (yellow card) 85'; Al-Shehri 90+3'	Stadium: King Abdullah Sport City Stadium; Attendance: 6,745; Referee: Tobias Welz (Germany)

25 October 2019 8	Damac	0–1	Al-Raed	Abha
18:20	Abousaban (yellow card) 70'	Report	Daoudi (yellow card) 45'; Fouzair 53' (pen.)	Stadium: Prince Sultan bin Abdul Aziz Stadium; Attendance: 6,916; Referee: Bas Nijhuis (Netherlands)

1 November 2019 9	Al-Raed	3–2	Al-Wehda	Buraidah
18:00	Daoudi 42', 90+2'; Arnaud Djoum (yellow card) 45'; Al-Amri (yellow card) 78'; Al-Fahad (yellow card) 80'; Palomeque (yellow card) 89'; Al-Ghamdi 90+5', (yellow card) 90+6'	Report	Anselmo (yellow card) 23', (goal) 75'; Bakshween (yellow card) 33'; Marcos Guilherme (yellow card) 53'; Goodwin 80' (pen.); Tambakti (yellow card) 90'	Stadium: King Abdullah Sport City Stadium; Attendance: 2,161; Referee: Ovidiu Hațegan (Romania)

6 November 2019 4	Al-Raed	0–3	Al-Taawoun	Buraidah
18:00	Daoudi (yellow card) 49'; Al-Zain (yellow card) 70'; Al-Showaish (yellow card) 88'	Report	Al-Olayan 2', (yellow card) 45' (yellow-red card) 62'; Al-Swat 18'; Héldon (yellow card) 55' (yellow-red card) 90+1', (goal) 90' (pen.); Barnawi (yellow card) 86'	Stadium: King Abdullah Sport City Stadium; Attendance: 11,320; Referee: Ivan Bebek (Croatia)

22 November 2019 10	Al-Hazem	2–3	Al-Raed	Ar Rass
17:55	Muralha (yellow card) 18'; Al-Khalaf 67'; Strandberg 74'; Al-Zubaidi (yellow card) 90+1'; Al-Qeshtah (yellow card) 90+4'	Report	Fouzair 21'; Djoum 42'; Al-Zain 56'; Doukha (yellow card) 73'; Al-Ghamdi (yellow card) 90'; Al-Sawadi (yellow card) 90+4'	Stadium: Al-Hazem Club Stadium; Attendance: 3,328; Referee: Jorge Sousa (Portugal)

12 December 2019 11	Al-Shabab	3–4	Al-Raed	Riyadh
17:45	Salem 44'; N'Diaye (yellow card) 61'; Guanca 67'; Asprilla 90+4'	Report	Al-Ghamdi 23', 51'; Al-Amri 33'; Daoudi 86'	Stadium: Prince Faisal bin Fahd Stadium; Attendance: 1,160; Referee: Mattias Gestranius (Finland)

21 December 2019 12	Al-Raed	3–2	Al-Ettifaq	Buraidah
15:20	Palomeque (yellow card) 25'; Djoum 35'; Daoudi (yellow card) 57'; Al-Ghamdi 77'; Al-Sahli 80'	Report	Al-Khateeb (yellow card) 37'; Al-Amri (yellow card) 42', (goal) 71'; Mahnashi (yellow card) 43' (yellow-red card) 90+4'; Al-Hazaa 48'; M'Bolhi (yellow card) 73'	Stadium: King Abdullah Sport City Stadium; Attendance: 1,408; Referee: Artur Soares Dias (Portugal)

26 December 2019 13	Al-Raed	1–0	Al-Adalah	Buraidah
17:55	Djoum 17'; Al-Farhan (yellow card) 24'; Daoudi (yellow card) 45+1'; Doukha (yellow card) 50'	Report	Al-Radhi (yellow card) 19'; Al Salem (yellow card) 21'; Al-Muwallad (yellow card) 44'	Stadium: King Abdullah Sport City Stadium; Attendance: 2,980; Referee: Kevin Blom (Netherlands)

11 January 2020 14	Al-Faisaly	0–1	Al-Raed	Al Majma'ah
18:05	Ashraf (yellow card) 28'	Report	Daoudi 3'; Pérez (yellow card) 90+3'	Stadium: Al Majma'ah Sports City; Attendance: 3,664; Referee: Mohammed Al-Hoaish

23 January 2020 15	Al-Raed	1–2	Al-Ahli	Buraidah
20:10	Al-Amri (yellow card) 38'; Fouzair 66'; Al-Rehaili (yellow card) 71'	Report	Al-Khabrani (yellow card) 15'; Djaniny (yellow card) 59'; Al Somah 84', 85'; Souza (yellow card) 90+4'	Stadium: King Abdullah Sport City Stadium; Attendance: 4,148; Referee: Shukri Al-Hanfoush

31 January 2020 16	Al-Raed	1–1	Al-Ittihad	Buraidah
20:15	Fouzair (yellow card) 31'; Al-Zain 50'	Report	El Ahmadi (yellow card) 28'; Gil 80', (yellow card) 90+5'	Stadium: King Abdullah Sport City Stadium; Attendance: 6,522; Referee: Mohammed Al-Hoaish

5 February 2020 17	Al-Hilal	3–1	Al-Raed	Riyadh
20:20	Carlos Eduardo 6'; Gomis 42' (pen.); Al-Mayouf 90+6'	Report	Al-Hussain (yellow card) 30'; Al-Farhan (yellow card) 41'; Fouzair 60' (pen.)	Stadium: King Saud University Stadium; Attendance: 16,566; Referee: Aleksei Kulbakov (Belarus)

15 February 2020 18	Al-Raed	2–1	Abha	Buraidah
15:55	Al-Hussain 14'; Pérez 88'	Report	Al-Habib (yellow card) 33'; Boukhenchouche (yellow card) 68'; Barnawi (yellow card) 70'; Chaouat 71'; Afana (yellow card) 75'; Al-Najjar (yellow card) 82'	Stadium: King Abdullah Sports City Stadium; Attendance: 2,545; Referee: Mattias Gestranius (Finland)

22 February 2020 19	Al-Taawoun	1–1	Al-Raed	Buraidah
16:00	Al-Sahlawi 35'; Barnawi (yellow card) 41' Assiri (yellow card) 66'; Amissi (yellow card) 68'; Abousaban (yellow card) 82'; Cássio (yellow card) 90+4'	Report	Fouzair 69' (pen.); Al-Ghamdi (yellow card) 81'; Al-Amri (yellow card) 90+4'	Stadium: King Abdullah Sport City Stadium; Attendance: 9,819; Referee: Serdar Gözübüyük (Netherlands)

28 February 2020 20	Al-Fayha	3–1	Al-Raed	Al Majma'ah
20:10	Al-Sobhi 43'; Al-Barakah (yellow card) 63'; Gegé 74'; Owusu 79'	Report	Al-Ghamdi 5'; Daoudi (yellow card) 82'; Al-Fahad (yellow card) 86'	Stadium: Al Majma'ah Sports City; Attendance: 3,655; Referee: Georgi Kabakov (Bulgaria)

6 March 2020 21	Al-Raed	0–0	Al-Fateh	Buraidah
16:05		Report	Saâdane (yellow card) 53'; Kanabah (yellow card) 78'; Al-Yousef (yellow card) 90+5'	Stadium: King Abdullah Sports City Stadium; Attendance: 1,885; Referee: Matej Jug (Slovenia)

12 March 2020 22	Al-Nassr	4–1	Al-Raed	Riyadh
20:40	Hamdallah 19', 90+4'; Giuliano 24'; Ali (yellow card) 46'; Amrabat 86'	Report	Al-Ghamdi 8', (yellow card) 73'; Al-Fahad (yellow card) 79'; Al-Showaish (yellow card) 90+1'	Stadium: Prince Faisal bin Fahd Stadium; Attendance: 0 (Note: Matches from 7 March and onwards will be played behind closed doors due to concerns over the coronavirus outbreak.); Referee: Tamás Bognár (Hungary)

4 August 2020 23	Al-Raed	3–0	Damac	Buraidah
19:25	Pérez 8'; Al-Zain 45+2', (yellow card) 71'; Fouzair 80'; Daoudi (yellow card) 90+3'	Report	Ilyas (yellow card) 20'; Hazzazi (yellow card) 49'; Al-Samti (yellow card) 54'	Stadium: King Abdullah Sport City Stadium; Attendance: 0 Referee: Khaled Al-Teris

9 August 2020 24	Al-Wehda	0–0	Al-Raed	Mecca
19:30	Luisinho (yellow card) 41'	Report	Al-Zain (yellow card) 13'; Pérez (yellow card) 20'; Al-Showaish (red card) 30'	Stadium: King Abdul Aziz Stadium; Attendance: 0 Referee: Irfan Peljto (Bosnia and Herzegovina)

14 August 2020 25	Al-Raed	3–1	Al-Hazem	Buraidah
19:15	Al-Hussain 25' (pen.); Al-Mogren (yellow card) 72'; Fouzair 77' (pen.), 87'	Report	Alemão (yellow card) 8', (goal) 68' (pen.); Al-Shammari (yellow card) 41'; Al-Zubaidi (yellow card) 81'; Al-Khalaf (yellow card) 84'	Stadium: King Abdullah Sport City Stadium; Attendance: 0 Referee: Tamás Bognár (Hungary)

19 August 2020 26	Al-Raed	2–1	Al-Shabab	Buraidah
20:55	Fouzair (yellow card) 47'; Daoudi 69'; Al-Hussain 80'	Report	Diop 17'; Sharahili (yellow card) 67'; Sebá (yellow card) 90+3'	Stadium: King Abdullah Sport City Stadium; Attendance: 0 Referee: Andris Treimanis (Latvia)

24 August 2020 27	Al-Ettifaq	4–0	Al-Raed	Dammam
18:45	Al Salem 7'; Doukara 13'; Kiss 45+3' (pen.); Al-Khateeb (yellow card) 76'; Al-Hazaa 90+5'	Report	Djoum (yellow card) 20'; Daoudi (yellow card) 57'; Al-Sahli (yellow card) 87'	Stadium: Prince Mohamed bin Fahd Stadium; Attendance: 0 Referee: Matthew Conger (New Zealand)

29 August 2020 28	Al-Adalah	1–1	Al-Raed	Al-Hasa
18:40	Gentsoglou (yellow card) 26'; Al-Yousef (yellow card) 28'; Hazazi (yellow card) 53', (goal) 90+1'; Majrashi (yellow card) 75'; Al-Sultan (yellow card) 81'	Report	Fouzair (yellow card) 52'; Al-Farhan (yellow card) 60'; Daoudi 76'; Al-Showaish (yellow card) 90+5'	Stadium: Prince Abdullah bin Jalawi Stadium; Attendance: 0 Referee: Bobby Madden (Scotland)

4 September 2020 29	Al-Raed	2–1	Al-Faisaly	Buraidah
20:35	Fouzair 15' (pen.); Daoudi (red card) 45+5'; Al-Amri (yellow card) 45+11'; Al-Dossari (yellow card) 89'; Djoum 90+1'; Doukha (yellow card) 90+7'	Report	Guilherme 22' (pen.), (yellow card) 24'; Hyland (yellow card) 45+5'; El Jebli (yellow card) 60'; Meadi (yellow card) 88'	Stadium: King Abdullah Sport City Stadium; Attendance: 0 Referee: Andrés Cunha (Uruguay)

9 September 2020 30	Al-Ahli	2–0	Al-Raed	Jeddah
20:35	Sarić (yellow card) 24'; Al-Asmari (yellow card) 42'; Al-Moasher 55'; Hassoun (yellow card) 66'; Abdulghani (yellow card) 77'; Al Somah 79'	Report	Al-Showaish (yellow card) 90+1'	Stadium: King Abdullah Sports City; Attendance: 0 Referee: Vítor Ferreira (Portugal)

=== King Cup ===
All times are local, AST (UTC+3).

10 November 2019 Round of 64	Hajer	0–2	Al-Raed	Al-Hasa
17:35	Al-Shehri (yellow card) 67'; Al-Sandal (yellow card) 80'	Report	Pérez 38'; Djoum (yellow card) 45+1'; Al-Ghamdi 50'; Al-Zain (yellow card) 90'	Stadium: Hajer Club Stadium; Referee: Mohammed Al-Buraidi

6 December 2019 Round of 32	Al-Raed	3–1 (a.e.t.)	Al-Mujazzal	Buraidah
15:15	Al-Ghamdi 91', 98'; Al-Rehaili (yellow card) 107'; Daoudi 111' (pen.)	Report	Al-Obaid (yellow card) 21'; Cléber (yellow card) 81'; Christovão 119'	Stadium: King Abdullah Sport City Stadium; Referee: Raed Al-Zahrani

2 January 2020 Round of 16	Al-Wehda	0–0 (a.e.t.) (4–3 p)	Al-Raed	Mecca
19:50	Al-Qarni (yellow card) 17'; Al-Rio (yellow card) 71'; Al-Qahtani (yellow card) 87'; Niakaté (yellow card) 90+2'; Botía (yellow card) 114'; Renato (yellow card) 117'	Report	Al-Ghamdi (yellow card) 41'; Daoudi (yellow card) 92'; Doukha (yellow card) 120'	Stadium: King Abdul Aziz Stadium; Referee: Igor Pajac (Croatia)
	Penalties
	Goodwin (penalty missed); Niakaté (penalty scored); Al-Saiari (penalty scored); Al-Qahtani (penalty scored); Anselmo (penalty missed); Al-Shamlan (penalty scored)		(penalty scored) Fouzair; (penalty scored) Palomeque; (penalty missed) Al-Sahli; (penalty scored) Daoudi; (penalty missed) Al-Sharimi; (penalty missed) Pérez

== Statistics ==
=== Squad statistics ===
Last updated on 9 September 2020.

No.	Pos	Nat	Player	Total		Pro League		King Cup	
No.	Pos	Nat	Player	Apps	Goals	Apps	Goals	Apps	Goals
Goalkeepers
13	GK	(Nigeria)	Abdulbassit Hawsawi	0	0	0	0	0	0
22	GK	(Saudi Arabia)	Ahmed Al-Rehaili	4	0	1	0	3	0
30	GK	(Algeria)	Azzedine Doukha	30	0	29	0	0+1	0
Defenders
2	DF	(Saudi Arabia)	Mohammed Al-Amri	31	1	29	1	2	0
4	DF	(Saudi Arabia)	Faisal Darisi	4	0	1+2	0	1	0
17	DF	(Saudi Arabia)	Mohammed Al-Shoraimi	14	0	9+4	0	1	0
19	DF	(Saudi Arabia)	Abdullah Al-Fahad	31	0	30	0	1	0
21	DF	(Saudi Arabia)	Mohammed Reeman	0	0	0	0	0	0
32	DF	(Saudi Arabia)	Mohammed Al-Dossari	26	0	23+2	0	1	0
33	DF	(Saudi Arabia)	Hussain Al-Showaish	23	0	12+8	0	3	0
40	DF	(Saudi Arabia)	Muteb Al-Mutlaq	2	0	0+1	0	1	0
92	DF	(Colombia)	Ezequiel Palomeque	20	0	18	0	2	0
Midfielders
5	MF	(Morocco)	Jalal Daoudi	26	8	19+5	7	2	1
7	MF	(Saudi Arabia)	Mohammed Al-Sahli	17	2	2+12	2	0+3	0
8	MF	(Cameroon)	Arnaud Djoum	32	4	29	4	3	0
10	MF	(Morocco)	Mohamed Fouzair	30	10	28	10	2	0
14	MF	(Saudi Arabia)	Abdullah Al-Mogren	16	0	1+13	0	1+1	0
15	MF	(Saudi Arabia)	Mohanad Al-Shudukhi	2	0	0+1	0	0+1	0
16	MF	(Saudi Arabia)	Bander Faleh	0	0	0	0	0	0
18	MF	(Syria)	Jehad Al-Hussain	29	3	19+8	3	1+1	0
23	MF	(Saudi Arabia)	Abdullah Majrashi	11	0	2+8	0	0+1	0
44	MF	(Saudi Arabia)	Sultan Al-Farhan	28	0	26	0	2	0
47	MF	(Saudi Arabia)	Ahmed Al-Zain	29	4	21+5	4	3	0
70	MF	(Saudi Arabia)	Hussain Al-Hajoj	0	0	0	0	0	0
Forwards
9	FW	(Saudi Arabia)	Raed Al-Ghamdi	30	9	13+14	6	2+1	3
11	FW	(Colombia)	Marco Pérez	30	5	16+11	4	2+1	1
77	FW	(Saudi Arabia)	Rayan Al-Marshoud	2	0	0+2	0	0	0
Player who made an appearance this season but have left the club
49	MF	(Saudi Arabia)	Sultan Al-Sawadi	4	0	2+1	0	0+1	0

=== Goalscorers ===
Rank	No.	Pos	Nat	Name	Pro League	King Cup	Total
1	10	MF	(Morocco)	Mohamed Fouzair	10	0	10
2	9	FW	(Saudi Arabia)	Raed Al-Ghamdi	6	3	9
3	5	MF	(Morocco)	Jalal Daoudi	7	1	8
4	11	FW	(Colombia)	Marco Pérez	4	1	5
5	8	MF	(Colombia)	Arnaud Djoum	4	0	4
5	47	MF	(Saudi Arabia)	Ahmed Al-Zain	4	0	4
7	18	MF	(Syria)	Jehad Al-Hussain	3	0	3
8	7	MF	(Saudi Arabia)	Mohammed Al-Sahli	2	0	2
9	2	DF	(Saudi Arabia)	Mohammed Al-Amri	1	0	1
Own goal					0	0	0
Total					41	5	46

Last Updated: 4 September 2020

=== Assists ===
Rank	No.	Pos	Nat	Name	Pro League	King Cup	Total
1	10	MF	(Morocco)	Mohamed Fouzair	4	1	5
2	18	MF	(Syria)	Jehad Al-Hussain	4	0	4
3	2	DF	(Saudi Arabia)	Mohammed Al-Amri	2	1	3
3	8	MF	(Colombia)	Arnaud Djoum	3	0	3
3	11	FW	(Colombia)	Marco Pérez	3	0	3
6	9	FW	(Saudi Arabia)	Raed Al-Ghamdi	2	0	2
6	47	MF	(Saudi Arabia)	Ahmed Al-Zain	2	0	2
8	14	MF	(Saudi Arabia)	Abdullah Al-Mogren	0	1	1
8	32	DF	(Saudi Arabia)	Mohammed Al-Dossari	1	0	1
Total					21	3	24

Last Updated: 19 August 2020

=== Clean sheets ===
Rank	No.	Pos	Nat	Name	Pro League	King Cup	Total
1	30	GK	(Algeria)	Azzedine Doukha	6	0	6
2	22	GK	(Saudi Arabia)	Ahmed Al-Rehaili	1	2	3
Total					7	2	9

Last Updated: 9 August 2020
