= Naif Hazazi =

Naif Hazazi may refer to:

- Naif Hazazi (footballer, born 1988), Saudi Arabian football striker
- Naif Hazazi (footballer, born 1992), Saudi Arabian football midfielder
