= Mansor Al-Beshe =

Saudi Arabian footballer (born 2000)

Mansor Al-Beshe منصور البيشي
Personal information
- Full name: Mansor Faiez Al-Beshe
- Date of birth: 24 April 2000 (age 26)
- Place of birth: Riyadh, Saudi Arabia
- Height: 1.68 m (5 ft 6 in)
- Position: Midfielder

Team information
- Current team: Al-Fayha
- Number: 14

Youth career
- –2018: Al-Hilal

Senior career*
Years	Team	Apps	(Gls)
2020–2022	Al-Hilal	0	(0)
2021–2022	→ Al-Raed (loan)	14	(1)
2022–2024	Al-Raed	51	(1)
2024–	Al-Fayha	0	(0)

International career
2018–2019	Saudi Arabia U20	23	(0)
2021–2022	Saudi Arabia U23		
- * Club domestic league appearances and goals as of 2 May 2023

Mansor Al-Beshe (Arabic: منصور البيشي; born 24 April 2000), is a Saudi Arabian professional footballer who plays as a midfielder for Saudi Professional League side Al-Fayha.

== Career ==
Al-Beshe started his career at the youth team of Al-Hilal and represented the club at every level. He was chosen in the Saudi program to develop football talents established by General Sports Authority in Saudi Arabia. On 21 January 2020, he signed his first professional contract with Al-Hilal. On 20 September 2020, Al-Beshe made his professional debut for Al-Hilal against Shahr Khodro in 2020 AFC Champions League. On 29 January 2021, Al-Beshe joined Al-Raed on loan. On 2 July 2021, Al-Beshe's loan to Al-Raed was renewed for another season. On 23 July 2022, Al-Beshe joined Al-Raed on a permanent deal following his release from Al-Hilal.

On 2 July 2024, Al-Beshe joined Al-Fayha on a three-year deal.

== Career statistics ==
=== Club ===
As of 27 May 2024.

Club	Season	League			Cup		Continental		Other		Total	
Club	Season	Division	Apps	Goals	Apps	Goals	Apps	Goals	Apps	Goals	Apps	Goals
Al-Hilal	2019–20	SPL	0	0	0	0	1	0	0	0	1	0
Al-Hilal	2020–21	SPL	0	0	0	0	0	0	0	0	0	0
Al-Hilal	Total		0	0	0	0	1	0	0	0	1	0
Al-Raed (loan)	2020–21	SPL	1	0	0	0	—		—		1	0
Al-Raed (loan)	2021–22	SPL	13	1	0	0	—		—		13	1
Al-Raed	2022–23	SPL	20	1	1	0	—		—		21	1
Al-Raed	2023–24	SPL	31	0	1	0	—		—		32	0
Al-Raed	Total		65	2	2	0	0	0	0	0	67	2
Career total			65	2	2	0	1	0	0	0	68	2

== Honours ==
=== International ===
Saudi Arabia U20

- AFC U-19 Championship: 2018
