= Abdullah Majrashi =

Saudi Arabian footballer

Personal information
- Full name: Abdullah Yahya Majrashi
- Date of birth: 24 August 1997 (age 29)
- Place of birth: Saudi Arabia
- Height: 1.74 m (5 ft 8 1/2 in)
- Position: Midfielder

Team information
- Current team: Al-Anwar
- Number: 14

Youth career
- –2017: Al-Ahli

Senior career*
Years	Team	Apps	(Gls)
2017–2019	Al-Ahli	13	(1)
2019	→ Ohod (loan)	3	(0)
2019–2024	Al-Raed	41	(0)
2024–2025	Al-Tai	27	(0)
2025–	Al-Anwar	0	(0)

International career
2016–2017	Saudi Arabia U20		
2017–2020	Saudi Arabia U23		
- * Club domestic league appearances and goals as of 30 May 2024

Abdullah Majrashi (Arabic: عبدالله مجرشي; born 24 August 1997) is a Saudi Arabian footballer who plays as a midfielder for Al-Anwar.

== Career ==
On 21 August 2024, Majrashi joined Al-Tai.

On 1 September 2025, Majrashi joined Al-Anwar.

== Personal life ==
Abdullah is the brother of the footballer Fahad Majrashi.

== Career statistics ==
=== Club ===
As of 27 May 2024

Club	Season	League		King Cup		Asia		Other		Total	
Club	Season	Apps	Goals	Apps	Goals	Apps	Goals	Apps	Goals	Apps	Goals
Al-Ahli	2017–18	8	1	3	0	3	0	—		14	1
Al-Ahli	2018–19	5	0	0	0	0	0	3 (Note: Appearances in Arab Club Champions Cup)	0	8	0
Al-Ahli	Total	13	1	3	0	3	0	3	0	22	1
Ohod (loan)	2018–19	3	0	0	0	—		—		3	0
Al-Raed	2019–20	10	0	1	0	—		—		11	0
Al-Raed	2020–21	12	0	0	0	—		—		12	0
Al-Raed	2021–22	11	0	1	0	—		—		12	0
Al-Raed	2022–23	4	0	0	0	—		—		4	0
Al-Raed	2023–24	4	0	0	0	—		—		4	0
Al-Raed	Total	41	0	2	0	0	0	0	0	43	0
Career totals		57	1	5	0	3	0	3	0	68	1
