= Raed Al-Ghamdi =

Saudi Arabian footballer (born 1994)

Personal information
- Full name: Raed Abdullah Al-Ghamdi
- Date of birth: 6 May 1994 (age 32)
- Place of birth: Jeddah, Saudi Arabia
- Height: 1.78 m (5 ft 10 in)
- Position: Forward

Youth career
- 2010–2013: Al-Ahli

Senior career*
Years	Team	Apps	(Gls)
2013–2018	Al-Ahli	3	(0)
2017	→ Al-Khaleej (loan)	9	(2)
2017–2018	→ Ohod (loan)	15	(2)
2018	Ohod	1	(0)
2018–2019	Al-Batin	13	(3)
2019–2025	Al-Raed	83	(11)
2020–2021	→ Al-Nassr (loan)	19	(2)

International career^{‡}
2013–2017	Saudi Arabia U23	8	(4)
2023–	Saudi Arabia	2	(0)
- * Club domestic league appearances and goals as of 21 September 2023 ‡ National team caps and goals as of 9 January 2023

Raed Abdullah Al-Ghamdi (Arabic: رائد عبدالله الغامدي; born 6 May 1994) is a professional footballer who plays as a forward .

== Career statistics ==
=== Club ===
As of match played 27 May 2024

Club	Season	League		King Cup		Asia		Other		Total	
Club	Season	Apps	Goals	Apps	Goals	Apps	Goals	Apps	Goals	Apps	Goals
Al-Ahli	2012–13	0	0	1	0	0	0	0	0	1	0
Al-Ahli	2013–14	2	0	0	0	—		1 (Note: Appearance in Crown Prince Cup)	0	3	0
Al-Ahli	2014–15	0	0	0	0	0	0	0	0	0	0
Al-Ahli	2015–16	0	0	0	0	0	0	0	0	0	0
Al-Ahli	2016–17	1	0	0	0	0	0	0	0	1	0
Al-Ahli	Total	3	0	1	0	0	0	1	0	5	0
Al-Khaleej (loan)	2016–17	9	2	0	0	—		0	0	9	2
Ohod (loan)	2017–18	15	2	1	0	—		2 (Note: Appearances in Relegation Play-offs)	0	18	2
Ohod	2018–19	1	0	0	0	—		—		1	0
Al-Batin	2018–19	13	3	2	1	—		—		15	4
Al-Raed	2019–20	27	6	3	3	—		—		30	9
Al-Raed	2021–22	21	5	0	0	—		—		21	5
Al-Raed	2022–23	18	0	1	0	—		—		19	0
Al-Raed	2023–24	12	0	1	0	—		—		13	0
Al-Raed	Total	78	11	5	3	0	0	0	0	83	14
Al-Nassr (loan)	2020–21	19	2	4	0	3	0	1 (Note: Appearances in Saudi Super Cup)	0	27	2
Career totals		138	20	13	4	3	0	4	0	158	24

== Honours ==
Al-Ahli

- Saudi Professional League: 2015–16
- King Cup: 2016
- Saudi Super Cup: 2016

Al-Nassr

- Saudi Super Cup: 2020
