= Sultan Al-Farhan =

Saudi Arabian footballer (born 1996)

Personal information
- Full name: Sultan Saad Al-Farhan
- Date of birth: 25 September 1996 (age 30)
- Place of birth: Khafji, Saudi Arabia
- Height: 1.70 m (5 ft 7 in)
- Position: Midfielder

Team information
- Current team: Al-Diriyah
- Number: 6

Youth career
- –2017: Al-Hilal

Senior career*
Years	Team	Apps	(Gls)
2017	Al-Hilal	0	(0)
2017–2023	Al-Raed	144	(0)
2023–2025	Al-Ittihad	13	(0)
2024–2025	→ Al-Taawoun (loan)	17	(0)
2025–	Al-Diriyah	32	(2)

International career
2013–2015	Saudi Arabia U17		
2016	Saudi Arabia U20		
2017–2018	Saudi Arabia U23		
- * Club domestic league appearances and goals as of 25 August 2026

Sultan Al-Farhan (Arabic: سلطان الفرحان, born 25 September 1996) is a Saudi Arabian professional footballer who plays as a midfielder for Saudi Pro League club Al-Diriyah.

== Career ==
Al-Farhan started his career at Al-Hilal and is a product of Al-Hilal's youth system. He signed his first professional contract with the club on 31 January 2017. On 5 August 2017, Al-Farhan was released from his contract by Al-Hilal and then joined Al-Raed. On 27 May 2018, Al-Farhan renewed his contract with Al-Raed. On 23 December 2019, Al-Farhan renewed his contract with Al-Raed until the end of the 2022–23 season. On 29 October 2021, Al-Farhan made his 100th appearance for Al-Raed.

On 11 July 2023, Al-Farhan joined Al-Ittihad on a free transfer. On 17 July 2024, Al-Farhan joined Al-Taawoun on a one-year loan.

On 10 August 2025, Al-Farhan joined First Division club Al-Diriyah.

== Career statistics ==
=== Club ===
As of match played 31 May 2025

Club	Season	League		King Cup		Asia		Other		Total	
Club	Season	Apps	Goals	Apps	Goals	Apps	Goals	Apps	Goals	Apps	Goals
Al-Raed	2017–18	13	0	0	0	—		2 (Note: Appearance(s) in Relegation play-offs)	0	15	0
Al-Raed	2018–19	25	0	3	0	—		—		28	0
Al-Raed	2019–20	26	0	2	0	—		—		28	0
Al-Raed	2020–21	28	0	1	0	—		—		29	0
Al-Raed	2021–22	30	0	1	0	—		—		31	0
Al-Raed	2022–23	22	0	0	0	—		—		22	0
Al-Raed	Total	144	0	7	0	0	0	2	0	153	0
Al-Ittihad	2023–24	13	0	3	0	5	0	5 (Note: Four appearances in Arab Club Champions Cup, and one appearance in FIFA Club World Cup)	0	26	0
Al-Taawoun (loan)	2024–25	17	0	1	0	5	0	0	0	23	0
Career totals		174	0	11	0	10	0	7	0	202	0
