= Mohamed Fouzair =

Moroccan footballer

Personal information
- Full name: Mohamed Fouzair
- Date of birth: 24 December 1991 (age 34)
- Place of birth: Casablanca, Morocco
- Height: 1.68 m (5 ft 6 in)
- Position: Midfielder

Youth career
- Raja Casablanca

Senior career*
| Years | Team | Apps | (Gls) |
| 2011–2017 | FUS Rabat | 115 | (13) |
| 2017–2019 | Al-Nassr | 22 | (8) |
| 2018 | → IR Tanger (loan) | 9 | (1) |
| 2019 | → Ohod (loan) | 9 | (2) |
| 2019–2025 | Al-Raed | 125 | (35) |
- * Club domestic league appearances and goals as of 14 September 2024

Mohamed Fouzair (Arabic: محمد فوزير; born 24 December 1991) is a Moroccan footballer who plays as a midfielder.

== International career ==
He was called up for the first time by Hervy Renard the international game against Mali on 1 September 2017 for the World Cup qualification game in Rabat.

== Career statistics ==
As of match played on 8 March 2024

Appearances and goals by club, season and competition
| Club | Season | League | | | National cup (Note: Includes Moroccan Throne Cup, King Cup) | | Other | | Total | |
| Club | Season | Division | Apps | Goals | Apps | Goals | Apps | Goals | Apps | Goals |
|---|---|---|---|---|---|---|---|---|---|---|
| FUS Rabat | 2011–12 | Botola | 2 | 0 | 0 | 0 | 0 | 0 | 2 | 0 |
| FUS Rabat | 2012–13 | Botola | 18 | 1 | 0 | 0 | 3 | 1 | 21 | 2 |
| FUS Rabat | 2013–14 | Botola | 21 | 1 | 0 | 0 | 0 | 0 | 21 | 1 |
| FUS Rabat | 2014–15 | Botola | 22 | 2 | 0 | 0 | 0 | 0 | 22 | 2 |
| FUS Rabat | 2015–16 | Botola | 24 | 4 | 0 | 0 | 0 | 0 | 24 | 4 |
| FUS Rabat | 2016–17 | Botola | 24 | 5 | 0 | 0 | 8 | 1 | 32 | 6 |
| FUS Rabat | 2017–18 | Botola | 0 | 0 | 1 | 0 | 9 | 6 | 10 | 6 |
| FUS Rabat | Total | | 115 | 13 | 1 | 0 | 20 | 8 | 136 | 21 |
| Al-Nassr | 2017–18 | Saudi Pro League | 22 | 8 | 1 | 0 | — | | 23 | 8 |
| IR Tanger (loan) | 2018–19 | Botola | 9 | 1 | 0 | 0 | 1 | 0 | 10 | 1 |
| Ohod Club (loan) | 2018–19 | Saudi Pro League | 9 | 2 | 0 | 0 | — | | 9 | 2 |
| Al Raed | 2018–19 | Saudi Pro League | 28 | 10 | 2 | 0 | — | | 30 | 10 |
| Al Raed | 2019–20 | Saudi Pro League | 16 | 2 | 1 | 0 | — | | 17 | 2 |
| Al Raed | 2020–21 | Saudi Pro League | 24 | 2 | 1 | 0 | — | | 25 | 2 |
| Al Raed | 2022–23 | Saudi Pro League | 27 | 11 | 1 | 0 | — | | 28 | 11 |
| Al Raed | 2023–24 | Saudi Pro League | 19 | 6 | 0 | 0 | — | | 19 | 6 |
| Al Raed | Total | | 114 | 31 | 5 | 0 | 0 | 0 | 119 | 31 |
| Career total | | | 269 | 55 | 7 | 0 | 21 | 8 | 297 | 63 |

== Honours ==
FUS Rabat

- Botola: 2015–16
- Moroccan Throne Cup: 2013–14; runner-up: 2014–15

Individual

- Arab Club Championship top scorer: 2016–17
