= Abdullah Al-Shanqiti =

Saudi Arabian footballer (born 1998)

Personal information
- Full name: Abdullah Ahmed Al-Shanqiti
- Date of birth: 22 December 1998 (age 27)
- Place of birth: Medina, Saudi Arabia
- Height: 1.84 m (6 ft 0 in)
- Position: Defender

Team information
- Current team: Al-Hazem
- Number: 13

Youth career
- Al-Ansar

Senior career*
Years	Team	Apps	(Gls)
2017–2020	Al-Ansar	70	(2)
2020–2022	Al-Nassr	0	(0)
2021–2022	→ Al-Raed (loan)	10	(0)
2022–2024	Al-Khaleej	25	(0)
2024–	Al-Hazem	20	(1)

International career
2018–2019	Saudi Arabia U23		
- * Club domestic league appearances and goals as of 28 April 2026

Abdullah Al-Shanqiti (Arabic: عبد الله الشنقيطي; born 22 December 1998) is a Saudi Arabian professional footballer who plays as a defender for Al-Hazem.

== Career ==
Al-Shanqiti started his career at the youth team of Al-Ansar and represented the club at every level. On 18 July 2020, he joined Al-Nassr from Al-Ansar for a reported fee of SAR 1 million and signed a three-year contract with the club. On 7 August 2021, Al-Shanqiti joined Al-Raed on loan. On 17 September 2021, he made his professional debut for Al-Raed against Al-Taawoun in the Pro League, replacing Karim El Berkaoui. On 27 July 2022, he joined Al-Khaleej on a two-year deal. In August 2024, Al-Shanqiti joined Al-Hazem.
