= Bander Faleh =

Saudi association football player

Bander Faleh بندر فالح
Personal information
- Full name: Bander Faleh Al-Enezi
- Date of birth: 25 December 1994 (age 31)
- Place of birth: Arar, Saudi Arabia
- Height: 1.60 m (5 ft 3 in)
- Position: Attacking midfielder

Team information
- Current team: Al-Jandal
- Number: 21

Youth career
- –2015: Arar

Senior career*
| Years | Team | Apps | (Gls) |
| 2015–2017 | Arar | | |
| 2017–2019 | Al-Orobah | 36 | (4) |
| 2019–2020 | Arar | | |
| 2020–2022 | Al-Raed | 0 | (0) |
| 2020–2022 | → Al-Shoulla (loan) | 60 | (3) |
| 2022–2023 | Al-Jabalain | 21 | (1) |
| 2023–2024 | Al-Jandal | 25 | (0) |
| 2024–2025 | Arar | | |
| 2025– | Al-Jandal | | |
- * Club domestic league appearances and goals

Bander Faleh (Arabic: بندر فالح; born 25 December 1994) is a Saudi Arabian professional footballer who plays as an attacking-midfielder for Al-Jandal.

== Career ==
Bander Faleh began his career at the youth team of Arar He arrived for the first team in 2015. On 7 June 2017, Bander Faleh joined with Al-Orobah . On 27 August 2019, Bander Faleh is back with Arar . On 4 February 2020, Bander Faleh joined Saudi Professional League side Al-Raed. On 29 August 2021, Faleh joined Al-Shoulla on loan. On 16 July 2022, Bander Faleh joined Al-Jabalain.

On 8 July 2023, Bander Faleh joined Al-Jandal. On 11 September 2024, Faleh joined Arar once for a third stint at the club. On 10 September 2025, Faleh joined Al-Jandal.
