= Hussain Al-Hajoj =

Saudi Arabian footballer

Hussain Al-Hajoj حُسَيْن الْهَاجُوج
Personal information
- Full name: Hussain Habib Al-Hajooj Al-Nakhli
- Date of birth: 16 June 1998 (age 28)
- Place of birth: Medina, Saudi Arabia
- Height: 1.73 m (5 ft 8 in)
- Position: Winger

Team information
- Current team: Al-Sahel
- Number: 77

Youth career
- –2017: Al-Ansar

Senior career*
Years	Team	Apps	(Gls)
2017–2018	Al-Ansar	20	(4)
2018–2020	Al-Ittihad	0	(0)
2019	→ Al-Fayha (loan)	5	(0)
2019–2020	→ Al-Adalah (loan)	7	(0)
2020–2021	Al-Raed	0	(0)
2020–2021	→ Najran (loan)	12	(4)
2021–2023	Al-Kawkab	50	(4)
2023–2024	Al-Safa	26	(5)
2025–	Al-Sahel		

International career
- Saudi Arabia U23
- * Club domestic league appearances and goals as of 8 May 2020

Hussain Habib Al-Hajooj Al-Nakhli (Arabic: حُسَيْن حَبِيب الْهَاجُوج النَّخْلِيّ, born 16 June 1998) is a Saudi professional footballer who plays as a winger for Al-Sahel.

== Career ==
Al-Hajoj he started his career with Al-Ansar. In his debut season with Al-Ansar, he helped get the club promoted to the MS League. Al-Hajoj left Al-Ansar and joined Pro League club Al-Ittihad on 28 October 2018. On 6 February 2019, Al-Hajoj joined Al-Fayha on a six-month loan. On 31 August 2019, he joined Al-Adalah on a one-year loan. However, his loan was cut short and returned to Al-Ittihad in January 2020. On 1 February 2020, Al-Hajoj joined Al-Raed on a permanent deal. On 21 October 2020, Al-Hajoj joined Najran on loan until the end of the 2020–21 season. On 3 June 2023, Al-Hajoj joined First Division side Al-Safa.
