= Mohammed Al-Sahli =

Saudi Arabian footballer

Mohammed Al-Sahli محمد السهلي
Personal information
- Full name: Mohammed Falah Al-Sahli
- Date of birth: 22 May 1992 (age 34)
- Place of birth: Qaisumah, Saudi Arabia
- Height: 1.75 m (5 ft 9 in)
- Position: Winger

Team information
- Current team: Al-Batin
- Number: 11

Youth career
- Al-Qaisumah

Senior career*
Years	Team	Apps	(Gls)
2013–2019	Al-Qaisumah		
2019–2021	Al-Raed	37	(5)
2021–2022	Damac	13	(0)
2022–2023	Al-Khaleej	16	(0)
2023–2024	Al-Batin	27	(8)
2024–2025	Al-Adalah	16	(2)
2025–	Al-Batin		
- * Club domestic league appearances and goals as of 31 May 2023

Mohammed Al-Sahli (Arabic: محمد السهلي; born 22 May 1992) is a Saudi Arabian professional footballer who plays as a winger for Al-Batin.

== Career ==
Al-Sahli began his career at the youth team of Al-Qaisumah. He was promoted to the first team in 2013. On 16 July 2019, Al-Sahli joined Saudi Professional League side Al-Raed. On 27 August 2021, Al-Sahli joined Damac. On 23 July 2022, Al-Sahli joined Al-Khaleej on a two-year deal. On 29 July 2023, Al-Sahli joined Al-Batin. In July 2024, Al-Sahli joined Al-Adalah. On 31 January 2025, Al-Sahli joined Al-Batin.
