= Abdullah Al-Mogren =

Saudi Arabian footballer

Abdullah Al-Mogren عبد الله المقرن
Personal information
- Full name: Abdullah Mohammed Al-Mogren
- Date of birth: November 26, 1996 (age 29)
- Place of birth: Shaqra, Saudi Arabia
- Positions: Midfielder; forward

Team information
- Current team: Al-Faisaly (on loan from Al-Fateh)
- Number: 14

Youth career
- –2015: Al-Washm

Senior career*
Years	Team	Apps	(Gls)
2015–2018	Al-Washm	?	(27)
2018–2022	Al-Raed	61	(8)
2022–2023	Al-Ahli	36	(7)
2023–	Al-Fateh	8	(0)
2024–2025	→ Damac (loan)	10	(0)
2025–	→ Al-Faisaly (loan)	0	(0)
- * Club domestic league appearances and goals as of 17 August 2023

Abdullah Al-Mogren (Arabic: عبد الله المقرن, born 26 November 1996) is a Saudi Arabian professional footballer who plays as a midfielder or a forward for Al-Faisaly on loan from Al-Fateh.

== Career ==
Al-Mogren started his career at Al-Washm in Saudi Third Division and was part of the squad that achieved promotion from the Saudi Third Division to the Saudi Second Division in the 2014–15 season. He also helped Al-Washm achieve promotion from the Saudi Second Division to the Prince Mohammad bin Salman League in the 2017–18 season. On 19 July 2018, Al-Mogren left Al-Washm and joined Pro league side Al-Raed. He renewed his contract with Al-Raed on July 14, 2019. On 30 January 2022, Al-Mogren joined Al-Ahli on a four-year contract. On 7 September 2023, Al-Mogren joined Al-Fateh on a four-year deal. On 23 August 2024, Al-Mogren joined Damac on loan. On 19 September 2025, Al-Mogren joined Al-Faisaly on loan.
