= Renê Santos =

Brazilian footballer

Personal information
- Full name: Renê Ferreira dos Santos
- Date of birth: 21 April 1992 (age 34)
- Place of birth: Salvador da Bahia, Brazil
- Height: 1.87 m (6 ft 2 in)
- Positions: Centre-back; defensive midfielder

Team information
- Current team: Guarani
- Number: 15

Youth career
- 2008–2009: Cruzeiro
- 2009: Corinthians Alagoano
- 2009–2010: Bahia
- 2010–2011: Grêmio

Senior career*
Years	Team	Apps	(Gls)
2011–2012	Grêmio	0	(0)
2012	→ Kawasaki Frontale (loan)	7	(0)
2013–2015	Zestaponi	43	(1)
2015–2017	Dinamo Tbilisi	45	(3)
2017	Vitória	17	(0)
2018	Atlético Goianiense	22	(1)
2018	Paraná	19	(0)
2019–2021	Marítimo	58	(1)
2021–2022	Al-Raed	27	(1)
2022–2024	Marítimo	44	(2)
2024–	Guarani	1	(0)
- * Club domestic league appearances and goals as of 24 November 2024

Renê Ferreira dos Santos (born 21 April 1992) is a Brazilian professional footballer who plays as a centre-back or defensive midfielder for Guarani.

Born in Salvador da Bahia, he played with Grêmio Porto Alegre in Brazil. In 2012, he played on loan in Japan in the J1 League with Kawasaki Frontale.

In summer 2013 he joined Georgian side FC Zestaponi. In January 2015, Renê Santos signed for FC Dinamo Tbilisi.

On 10 January 2019, Renê Santos signed a contract with Guarani.

== Career statistics ==
As of 1 August 2024

Appearances and goals by club, season and competition
Club	Season	League			State league		National cup		Continental		Other		Total	
Club	Season	Division	Apps	Goals	Apps	Goals	Apps	Goals	Apps	Goals	Apps	Goals	Apps	Goals
Grêmio	2011	Série A	0	0	—		—		—		—		0	0
Kawasaki Frontale (loan)	2012	J1 League	4	0	—		—		—		3 (Note: Appearance(s) in J.League Cup)	0	7	0
Zestaponi	2013–14	Umaglesi Liga	29	1	—		3	0	—		—		32	1
Zestaponi	2014–15	Umaglesi Liga	14	0	—		1	0	2 (Note: Appearance(s) in UEFA Europa League)	0	—		17	0
Zestaponi	Total		43	1	0	0	4	0	2	0	0	0	49	1
Dinamo Tbilisi	2014–15	Umaglesi Liga	14	0	—		5	0	—		—		19	0
Dinamo Tbilisi	2015–16	Umaglesi Liga	21	2	—		7	0	2	0	1 (Note: Appearance(s) in Georgian Super Cup)	0	31	2
Dinamo Tbilisi	2016	Umaglesi Liga	10	1	—		0	0	6 (Note: Four appearances in UEFA Champions League, Two appearances in UEFA Europa League)	0	—		16	1
Dinamo Tbilisi	Total		45	3	0	0	12	0	8	0	1	0	66	3
Vitória	2017	Série A	13	0	4 (Note: Appearance(s) in Campeonato Baiano)	0	—		—		0	0	17	0
Atlético Goianiense	2018	Série B	10	0	11 (Note: Appearance(s) in Campeonato Goiano)	1	1	0	—		—		22	1
Paraná	2018	Série A	19	0	—		—		—		—		19	0
Marítimo B	2018–19	Campeonato de Portugal	2	0	—		—		—		—		2	0
Marítimo	2018–19	Primeira Liga	12	0	—		—		—		—		12	0
Marítimo	2019–20	Primeira Liga	31	1	—		—		—		3 (Note: Appearance(s) in Taça da Liga)	0	34	1
Marítimo	2020–21	Primeira Liga	27	0	—		3	0	—		—		30	0
Marítimo	Total		70	1	0	0	3	0	0	0	3	0	76	1
Al Raed	2021–22	Saudi Pro League	25	1	—		1	0	—		—		26	1
Al Raed	2022–23	Saudi Pro League	2	0	—		0	0	—		—		2	0
Al Raed	Total		27	1	0	0	1	0	0	0	0	0	28	1
Marítimo	2022–23	Primeira Liga	14	1	—		—		—		1 (Note: Appearance(s) in Promotion/Relegation play-offs)	0	15	1
Marítimo	2023–24	Liga Portugal 2	30	1	—		3	0	—		1	0	34	1
Marítimo	Total		44	2	0	0	3	0	0	0	2	0	49	2
Guarani	2024	Série B	1	0	—		—		—		—		1	0
Career total			278	8	15	1	24	0	10	0	9	0	336	9

== Honours ==
Individual

- Primeira Liga Defender of the Month: June 2020
