= Abdulmohsen Al-Qahtani =

Saudi Arabian footballer

Personal information
- Full name: Abdulmohsen Abdullah Al-Qahtani
- Date of birth: 5 June 1999 (age 27)
- Place of birth: Khobar, Saudi Arabia
- Height: 1.71 m (5 ft 7 in)
- Positions: Winger; attacking midfielder

Team information
- Current team: Al-Safa
- Number: 74

Senior career*
Years	Team	Apps	(Gls)
2018–2021	Al-Qadsiah	21	(0)
2021–2023	Al-Raed	14	(0)
2023–2024	Al-Riyadh	0	(0)
2024–	Al-Safa	0	(0)

International career^{‡}
2017–2019	Saudi Arabia U20	26	(4)
2019–2022	Saudi Arabia U23	9	(1)
2019–	Saudi Arabia	1	(0)
- * Club domestic league appearances and goals as of 20 September 2020 ‡ National team caps and goals as of 4 August 2019

Abdulmohsen Al-Qahtani (Arabic: عبد المحسن القحطاني; born 5 June 1999) is a Saudi Arabian footballer who plays for Al-Safa as a midfielder.

== Honours ==
=== International ===
Saudi Arabia U20

- AFC U-19 Championship: 2018
