= Khaled Al-Khathlan =

Saudi Arabian association football player

Khaled Al-Khathlan خالد الخثلان
Personal information
- Full name: Khaled Abdulaziz Al-Khathlan
- Date of birth: 3 August 1996 (age 30)
- Place of birth: Saudi Arabia
- Position: Left-back

Team information
- Current team: Al-Batin
- Number: 4

Youth career
- –2015: Al-Hilal
- 2015–2017: Al-Nassr

Senior career*
Years	Team	Apps	(Gls)
2017–2019	Al-Qaisumah	62	(1)
2019–2020	Abha	26	(0)
2020–2023	Al-Raed	45	(0)
2023–	Al-Batin	0	(0)
- * Club domestic league appearances and goals as of 31 May 2023

Khaled Al-Khathlan (Arabic: خالد الخثلان, born 3 August 1996) is a Saudi Arabian professional footballer who plays as a left-back for Al-Batin.

== Career ==
Al-Khathlan began his career at the youth team of Al-Hilal. He joined the U23 team of Al-Nassr in 2015. On 14 August 2017, Al-Khathlan signed for Al-Qaisumah. On 9 July 2019, Al-Khathlan signed a three-year contract with Abha. On 31 January 2020, Al-Khathlan joined Al-Raed and signed a 3-year contract with the club. On 29 July 2023, Al-Khathlan joined Al-Batin.

== Career statistics ==
=== Club ===
As of 9 September 2020.

Club	Season	League			Cup		Continental		Other		Total	
Club	Season	Division	Apps	Goals	Apps	Goals	Apps	Goals	Apps	Goals	Apps	Goals
Al-Qaisumah	2017–18	MS League	28	0	1	0	–		–		29	0
Al-Qaisumah	2018–19	MS League	34	1	2	0	–		–		36	1
Al-Qaisumah	Total		62	1	3	0	0	0	0	0	65	1
Abha	2019–20	Pro League	26	0	3	0	–		–		29	0
Career total			88	1	6	0	0	0	0	0	94	1
