= Naif Hazazi (footballer, born 1992) =

Saudi Arabian footballer

Personal information
- Full name: Naif Abdullah Ali Hazazi
- Date of birth: September 30, 1992 (age 34)
- Place of birth: Khobar, Saudi Arabia
- Height: 1.75 m (5 ft 9 in)
- Position: Midfielder

Team information
- Current team: Al-Jandal
- Number: 88

Youth career
- Al-Qadsiah

Senior career*
Years	Team	Apps	(Gls)
2012–2021	Al-Qadsiah	197	(4)
2021–2025	Al-Raed	50	(1)
2025–	Al-Jandal	0	(0)

International career^{‡}
2017–2019	Saudi Arabia	5	(0)
- * Club domestic league appearances and goals as of 20:02, 16 January 2025 (UTC) ‡ National team caps and goals as of 20:31, 10 August 2019 (UTC)

Naif Hazazi (Arabic: نايف هزازي, born 30 September 1992) is a Saudi Arabian football player who currently plays as a midfielder Al-Jandal.

== Career ==
On 29 July 2021, Hazazi joined Al-Raed after 9 years at Al-Qadsiah.

On 20 September 2025, Hazazi joined Saudi First Division League club Al-Jandal.

== Career statistics ==
=== International ===
Statistics accurate as of match played 10 August 2019.

Team	Year	Apps	Goals
Saudi Arabia
Saudi Arabia	2017	2	0
Saudi Arabia	2019	3	0
Saudi Arabia	Total	5	0

== Honours ==
Al-Qadsiah

- MS League/First Division: 2014–15, runner-up 2019–20
