= King Abdullah Sports City Stadium Buraydah =

Football stadium in Saudi Arabia

- ملعب مدينة الملك عبدالله الرياضية ببريدة
- Buraydah Stadium
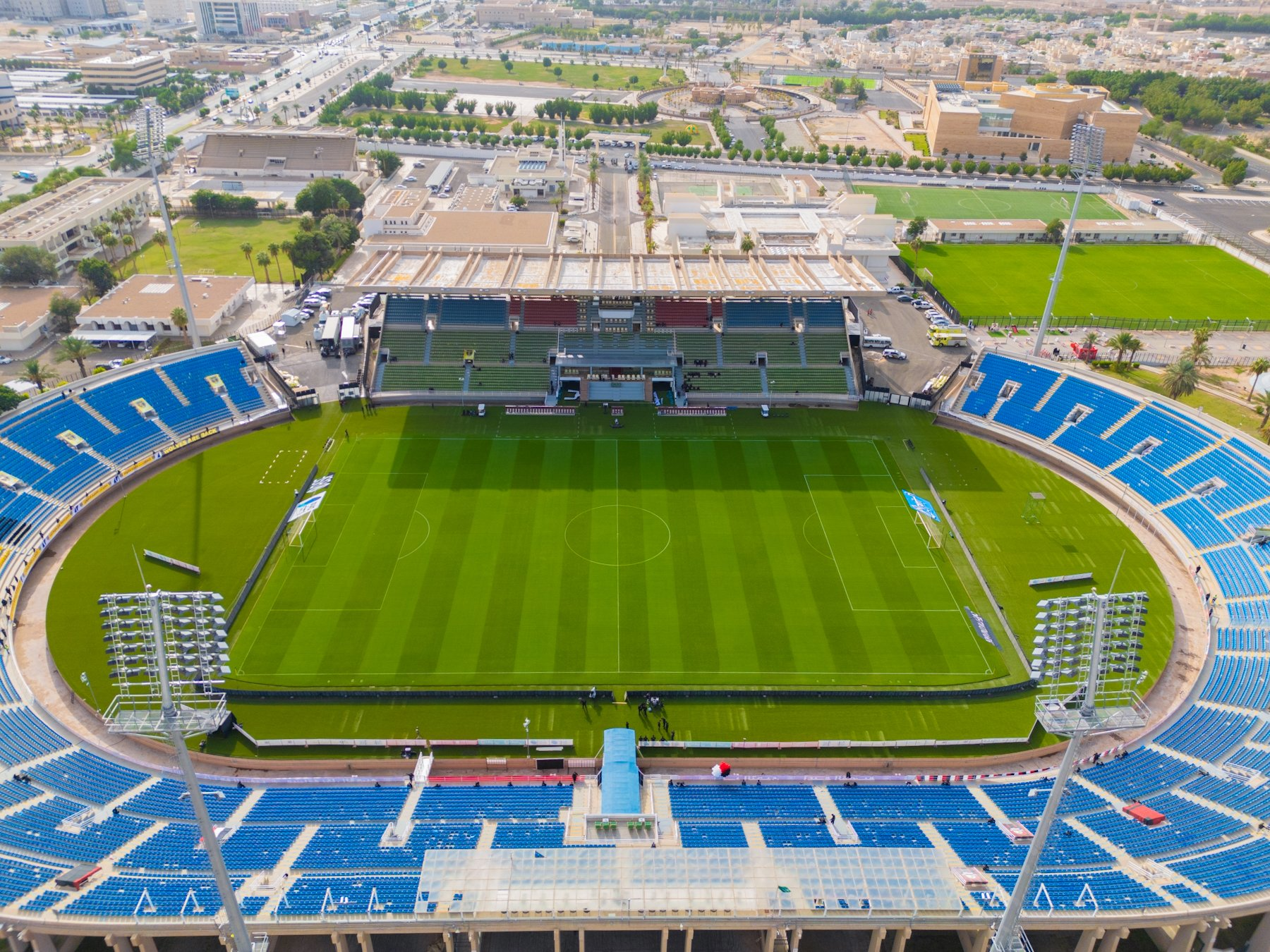
- Interactive map of King Abdullah Sports City Stadium Buraydah
- Full name: King Abdullah Sports City (Buraydah)
- Location: Buraydah, Saudi Arabia
- Coordinates: 26.3789°N 43.9478°E
- Owner: Ministry of Sport
- Operator: Ministry of Sport
- Capacity: 30,180
- Executive suites: 180
- Surface: Grass

Construction
- Opened: 1980

Tenants
- Al-Taawoun (1980–present); Al-Raed (1980–present); Al-Hazem (Selected matches); Al-Fayha (Selected matches); Al-Kholood (Selected matches); Saudi Arabia national football team (Selected matches)

King Abdullah Sports City Stadium Buraydah, also known as Buraydah Stadium, is a multi-purpose stadium in Buraydah, primarily used for football. It hosts the home matches of Al-Taawoun, Al-Raed, the stadium also accommodates matches for clubs from outside the province in emergency situations.

== History ==
The first official match played at the stadium was on 24 December 1982 between Al-Taawoun and Al-Tai in the second week of the 1982–83 Saudi First Division League. The match ended in a 1–1 draw. The first official goal scored in the stadium was an own goal by one of Al-Tai's defenders. The match saw an attendance of 10,000 people.

== Facilities ==
Administration Building: The administration building consists of two floors and is centrally located at the city’s entrance. It houses the office of the General Authority for Sports and Club Affairs.

Youth House: The Youth House comprises three floors. The ground floor is dedicated to administrative purposes, while the first and second floors are designed to host guests and accommodate training camps. It can house up to 180 people, offering 22 double rooms and 22 shared rooms.

Restaurant: The on-site restaurant can accommodate approximately 300 guests and is fully equipped with modern kitchen facilities.

Hobbies Building: The hobbies building features a library, a referee hall, training rooms, and facilities for tennis and billiards.

Theater: The theater hosts a range of activities, including cultural performances, as well as seminars in the fields of culture, science, and society. It has a seating capacity of around 580.

Sports Facilities: The city boasts several sports venues:

Main Football Stadium: The stadium has a seating capacity of 34,000, with an additional 180 seats in the VIP area. It has hosted numerous football matches, including the famous local derby between Al-Raed and Al-Taawoun, as well as key qualification rounds for international competitions. Notably, it was the venue for the 1993 AFC Cup qualifiers, featuring teams from Saudi Arabia, Syria, Hong Kong, and Bangladesh. The stadium has also hosted training camps for the Saudi national football teams and was the venue for the 29th Gulf Club Championship, where Al-Raed participated. Additionally, it has been the site of a friendly match between Al-Taawoun and South Korea's national team.

Training Pitch: A dedicated pitch for practice and training.

Indoor Sports Hall: This facility accommodates various sports, including handball, basketball, volleyball, and other team sports, with a seating capacity of approximately 1,117 people.

Medical Care Center: This facility includes a fully-equipped gym with a sauna and fitness equipment.

Swimming Pool: The pool is classified as an international-standard facility, measuring 50 meters by 25 meters, with eight lanes and a seating capacity for approximately 4,000 spectators.

== See also ==
- List of football stadiums in Saudi Arabia
- List of things named after Saudi kings
