= Abdullah Al-Fahad =

Saudi Arabian footballer

Personal information
- Full name: Abdullah Fahad Abdulaziz Al-Fahad
- Date of birth: June 15, 1994 (age 32)
- Place of birth: Harmah, Saudi Arabia
- Height: 1.77 m (5 ft 10 in)
- Position: Defender

Team information
- Current team: Abha
- Number: 19

Youth career
- 2009–2013: Al-Faisaly
- 2013–2015: Al-Shabab

Senior career*
Years	Team	Apps	(Gls)
2012–2013	Al-Faisaly	4	(0)
2013–2018	Al-Shabab	41	(2)
2018–2024	Al-Raed	141	(0)
2024–2025	Al-Khaleej	22	(0)
2025–	Abha	0	(0)

International career
2015–2017	Saudi Arabia U23		
- * Club domestic league appearances and goals as of 27 May 2024

Abdullah Fahad Abdulaziz Al-Fahad (Arabic: عبدالله فهد عبدالعزيز الفهد, born 15 June 1994) is a Saudi Arabian football player who plays as a centre back for Abha.

== Career ==
On 10 June 2013, Al-Fahad joined Al-Shabab. On 10 June 2018, Al-Fahad joined Al-Raed. On 23 July 2024, Al-Fahad joined Al-Khaleej on a free transfer. On 31 August 2025, Al-Fahad joined Abha.

== Honours ==
Al-Shabab

- King Cup: 2014
- Saudi Super Cup: 2014
