= Ahmed Al-Zain =

Saudi Arabian footballer (born 1991)

Personal information
- Full name: Ahmed Yousef Al-Zain
- Date of birth: 2 July 1991 (age 35)
- Place of birth: Jeddah, Saudi Arabia
- Height: 1.80 m (5 ft 11 in)
- Position: Winger

Team information
- Current team: Al-Ula
- Number: 49

Youth career
- Al-Ittihad

Senior career*
Years	Team	Apps	(Gls)
2013–2015	Abha		
2015–2017	Al-Taawoun	46	(6)
2017–2019	Al-Ahli	2	(0)
2018	→ Al-Fayha (loan)	3	(0)
2018–2019	→ Al-Qadsiah (loan)	14	(4)
2019–2022	Al-Raed	76	(9)
2022–2024	Damac	38	(2)
2023	→ Al-Khaleej (loan)	11	(0)
2024–	Al-Ula		

International career^{‡}
2019–	Saudi Arabia	2	(0)
- * Club domestic league appearances and goals as of 26 October 2023 ‡ National team caps and goals as of 25 March 2019

Ahmed Yousef Al-Zain (Arabic: أَحْمَد يُوسُف الزَّيْن; born 2 July 1991) is a Saudi professional footballer who plays as a winger for Al-Ula.

== Club career ==
He started out his footballing career at Al-Ittihad where he spent his youth years before joining Abha in the summer of 2013. Al-Zain spent two successful seasons at Abha before joining Pro League Al-Taawoun in 2015. Al-Zain returned to Jeddah, joining Al-Ahli in the summer of 2017 after two successful seasons with Al-Taawoun. On 29 January 2018, Al-Zain joined Al-Fayha on loan until the end of the 2017–18 season. On 22 July 2018, Al-Zain joined Al-Qadsiah on loan until the end of the 2018–19 season. On 28 July 2019, Al-Zain joined Al-Raed on a three-year deal. On 27 February 2022, Al-Zain signed a pre-contract deal with Damac. He joined the club following the expiration of his contract with Al-Raed on 30 June 2022. On 27 January 2023, Al-Zain joined Al-Khaleej on loan. On 1 August 2024, Al-Zain joined Second Division side Al-Ula.
