= Ahmed Al-Rehaili =

Saudi Arabian footballer

Personal information
- Full name: Ahmed Ali Saleem Al-Rehaili Al-Harbi
- Date of birth: October 6, 1994 (age 32)
- Place of birth: Mecca, Saudi Arabia
- Height: 1.89 m (6 ft 2 in)
- Position: Goalkeeper

Team information
- Current team: Al-Ettifaq
- Number: 23

Youth career
- –2015: Al-Ahli

Senior career*
Years	Team	Apps	(Gls)
2015–2019	Al-Ahli	11	(0)
2017–2018	→ Al-Raed (loan)	7	(0)
2019–2024	Al-Raed	31	(0)
2024–	Al-Ettifaq	0	(0)
2025	→ Al-Nassr (loan)	0	(0)
2025–2026	→ Al-Diriyah (loan)	3	(0)

International career
2016	Saudi Arabia U23	3	(0)
- * Club domestic league appearances and goals as of 5 November 2026

Ahmed Al-Rehaili Al-Harbi (Arabic: أحمد الرحيلي الحربي; born 6 October 1994) is a Saudi Arabian professional footballer who plays as a goalkeeper for Saudi Pro League side Al-Ettifaq.

== Career ==
On 6 August 2024, Al-Rehaili joined Al-Ettifaq on a four-year deal. On 31 January 2025, Al-Rehaili joined Al-Nassr on a six-month loan. On 9 September 2025, Al-Rehaili joined Al-Diriyah on loan.

== Honours ==
=== Club ===
- Al-Ahli

- Saudi Champions Cup: 2016
- Saudi Professional League: 2015–16
