= Muteb Al-Mutlaq =

Saudi Arabian footballer

Personal information
- Full name: Muteb Mesfer Al-Mutlaq
- Date of birth: 10 December 1997 (age 28)
- Place of birth: Riyadh, Saudi Arabia
- Height: 1.65 m (5 ft 5 in)
- Position: Right-back

Team information
- Current team: Al-Mehmal
- Number: 40

Senior career*
Years	Team	Apps	(Gls)
2016–2019	Al-Nassr	4	(0)
2018	→ Al-Raed (loan)	6	(0)
2018–2019	→ Al-Raed (loan)	15	(0)
2019–2022	Al-Raed	2	(0)
2020–2021	→ Al-Sahel (loan)	3	(0)
2022–2023	Al-Shoulla		
2025–	Al-Mehmal		
- * Club domestic league appearances and goals as of 16 December 2018

Muteb Al-Mutlaq (Arabic: متعب المطلق, born 10 December 1997) is a Saudi football player who plays for Al-Mehmal as a right back.

== Career ==
Al-Mutlaq started his career at Al-Nassr's youth teams. On 27 January 2018, Al-Mutlaq joined Al-Raed on loan. On 1 August 2018, Al-Mutlaq's loan to Al-Raed was renewed for another season. On 27 August 2019, Al-Mutlaq joined Al-Raed on a permanent deal. On 30 October 2020, Al-Mutlaq joined Al-Sahel on loan. On 7 July 2022, Al-Mutlaq joined Al-Shoulla.
