= Al-Jandal SC =

Association football club in Saudi Arabia

Al-Jandal
- Full name: Al-Jandal Sport Club
- Founded: 1976; 50 years ago
- Ground: Al-Orobah Club Stadium
- Capacity: 7,000
- Chairman: Meshal Al-Hassan
- Head coach: Ziyad Al-Afar
- League: FD League
- 2025–26: FDL, 15th of 18
Home colours

Al-Jandal Sport Club (Arabic: نادي الجندل) is a professional Saudi-Arabian football club based in Dumat al-Jandal, They currently play in the FD League, the second tier of Saudi football.

The club play their home games at the Al-Orobah Club Stadium and the Al Jouf University Stadium.

== History ==
The club was founded in 1976, In the 2024–25 King's Cup Al-Jandal made a huge upset when they knockout Al-Ahli in the Round of 32.

== Current squad ==
As of 31 July 2024

Note: Flags indicate national team as defined under FIFA eligibility rules; some limited exceptions apply. Players may hold more than one non-FIFA nationality.

No.	Pos.	Nation	Player
1	GK	KSA	Abdulrahman Al-Shammari
2	DF	KSA	Anwar Al-Ruwaili
4	DF	KSA	Mishal Haddad (on loan from Al-Faisaly)
5	DF	KSA	Jamaan Al-Dossari
8	MF	KSA	Abdulaziz Majrashi (on loan from Al-Wehda)
10	MF	GUI	Hassimi Fadiga
11	MF	KSA	Saleh Al-Harthi
17	MF	KSA	Mohammed Mansour
18	FW	KSA	Mishari Al-Khalif
19	FW	POR	João Silva
20	MF	KSA	Omar Al-Rashed
21	MF	KSA	Hussain Al-Eisa
22	GK	KSA	Abdulrahman Al-Sharari
23	DF	FRA	Thibault Peyre

No.	Pos.	Nation	Player
24	DF	KSA	Mansour Al-Shammari
26	MF	KSA	Munther Al-Nakhli
32	DF	KSA	Masoud Bakheet
33	DF	KSA	Yasser Fallatah
34	GK	KSA	Mohammed Al-Burayh
39	FW	KSA	Motaz Al-Sharari
60	DF	KSA	Fahad Al-Sharari
79	MF	GAB	Clench Loufilou
87	MF	KSA	Meshal Al-Zahrani
90	MF	KSA	Abdulkareem Al-Abdullah
94	MF	KSA	Nawaf Al-Sehimai
99	FW	BRA	Fabinho
—	FW	KSA	Fahad Al-Johani

== Coaching staff ==
Position	Name
Head coach	(Saudi Arabia) Ziyad Al-Afar
Assistant coach	(Saudi Arabia) Khaled Yaqoub
Goalkeeper coach	(Saudi Arabia) Abdulaziz Al-Haseeb
Fitness coach	(Saudi Arabia) Yousuf Al-Sulayhim
Match analyst	(Saudi Arabia) Naeem Al-Sulayhim
Doctor	(Saudi Arabia) Ibrahim Al-Othman
Physiotherapist	(Saudi Arabia) Rashid Al-Omari

== See also ==
- List of football clubs in Saudi Arabia
