= 2024–25 Al-Raed FC season =

Al-Raed
2024–25 season
- Chairman: Fahad Al-Motawa'a
- Manager: Odair Hellmann (until 1 April 2025); Krešimir Režić (from 1 April 2025)
- Stadium: King Abdullah Sport City Stadium; Al-Raed Club Stadium
- SPL: 18th (relegated)
- King Cup: Semi-finals (knocked out by Al-Qadsiah)
- Top goalscorer: League: Karim El Berkaoui (11 goals); All: Karim El Berkaoui (12 goals)
- Highest home attendance: 18,796 v Al-Ittihad; 15 May 2025; Saudi Pro League
- Lowest home attendance: 471 v Al-Kholood; 26 May 2025; Saudi Pro League
- Average home league attendance: 3,761
- All statistics correct as of 26 May 2025.

The 2024–25 season was Al-Raed's 71st year in their history and 17th consecutive season in the Pro League. The club participated in the Pro League and the King Cup.

The season covers the period from 1 July 2024 to 30 June 2025.

== Players ==
=== Squad information ===
As of 1 February 2025

Note: Flags indicate national team as defined under FIFA eligibility rules; some limited exceptions apply. Players may hold more than one non-FIFA nationality.

No.	Pos.	Nation	Player
1	GK	POR	André Moreira
4	DF	KSA	Abdullah Hazazi
5	MF	LBR	Salomon Tweh
7	MF	ALG	Amir Sayoud
8	MF	NOR	Mathias Normann
9	FW	KSA	Raed Al-Ghamdi
10	MF	MAR	Mohamed Fouzair
11	FW	MAR	Karim El Berkaoui
12	DF	KSA	Zakaria Hawsawi
13	DF	KSA	Abdullah Al-Yousef
15	MF	KSA	Saleh Al-Amri (on loan from Al-Ittihad)
16	DF	MAR	Ayoub Qasmi
17	MF	ALG	Mehdi Abeid
18	MF	KSA	Naif Hazazi
21	DF	CMR	Oumar Gonzalez
23	GK	KSA	Basil Al-Enezi
24	DF	KSA	Khalid Al-Subaie
26	FW	ALG	Yousri Bouzok

No.	Pos.	Nation	Player
28	DF	KSA	Hamad Al-Jayzani
30	GK	KSA	Saleh Al-Ohaymid
31	GK	EGY	Abdelrahman Sherif
32	DF	KSA	Mohammed Al-Dossari
34	FW	KSA	Azim Al-Sayil
41	FW	KSA	Nawaf Al-Sahli
42	MF	KSA	Anas Al-Zahrani
43	DF	KSA	Abdullah Al-Rawdhan
45	MF	KSA	Yahya Sunbul
47	DF	KSA	Mubarak Al-Shayie
48	FW	KSA	Faisal Nahet
50	GK	KSA	Meshari Sanyor
52	DF	KSA	Tamim Al-Shuqayran
55	GK	KSA	Feras Al-Rajhi
70	FW	SLE	Moses Turay
94	DF	KSA	Mubarak Al-Rajeh
99	FW	KSA	Thamer Al-Khaibari (on loan from Al-Ettifaq)

=== Out on loan ===
Note: Flags indicate national team as defined under FIFA eligibility rules; some limited exceptions apply. Players may hold more than one non-FIFA nationality.

No.	Pos.	Nation	Player
2	DF	KSA	Bandar Wohaishi (at Al-Tai until 30 June 2025)

== Transfers and loans ==
=== Transfers in ===
Entry date	Position	No.	Player	From club	Fee	Ref.
30 June 2024	DF	66	(Saudi Arabia) Abdullah Al-Shaflut	(Saudi Arabia) Al-Najma	End of loan	
13 August 2024	DF	12	(Saudi Arabia) Zakaria Hawsawi	(Saudi Arabia) Al-Ittihad	Undisclosed	
25 August 2024	GK	30	(Saudi Arabia) Saleh Al-Ohaymid	(Saudi Arabia) Al-Ittihad	Free	
25 August 2024	MF	17	(Algeria) Mehdi Abeid	(Turkey) İstanbul Başakşehir	Free	
26 August 2024	DF	16	(Morocco) Ayoub Qasmi	(Morocco) FUS Rabat	Free	
1 September 2024	DF	4	(Saudi Arabia) Abdullah Hazazi	(Saudi Arabia) Al-Qadsiah	Free	
10 January 2025	MF	5	(Liberia) Salomon Tweh	(Senegal) Guédiawaye	Undisclosed	
10 January 2025	FW	70	(Sierra Leone) Moses Turay	(Finland) SJK Akatemia	$30,000	
14 January 2025	FW	26	(Algeria) Yousri Bouzok	(Morocco) Raja CA	Free	

=== Loans in ===
Start date	End date	Position	No.	Player	From club	Fee	Ref.
13 August 2024	End of season	MF	15	(Saudi Arabia) Saleh Al-Amri	(Saudi Arabia) Al-Ittihad	None	
4 September 2024	End of season	FW	99	(Saudi Arabia) Thamer Al-Khaibari	(Saudi Arabia) Al-Ettifaq	None	

=== Transfers out ===
Exit date	Position	No.	Player	To club	Fee	Ref.
30 June 2024	MF	5	(Senegal) Mamadou Loum	(Portugal) Porto	End of loan	
30 June 2024	MF	55	(Saudi Arabia) Nasser Al-Hadhood	(Saudi Arabia) Al-Hilal	End of loan	
2 July 2024	MF	14	(Saudi Arabia) Mansor Al-Beshe	(Saudi Arabia) Al-Fayha	Free	
19 July 2024	FW	17	(Cape Verde) Júlio Tavares	(Saudi Arabia) Al-Diriyah	Free	
23 July 2024	DF	19	(Saudi Arabia) Abdullah Al-Fahad	(Saudi Arabia) Al-Khaleej	Free	
6 August 2024	GK	23	(Saudi Arabia) Ahmed Al-Rehaili	(Saudi Arabia) Al-Ettifaq	Undisclosed	
21 August 2024	MF	6	(Saudi Arabia) Abdullah Majrashi	(Saudi Arabia) Al-Tai	Free	
28 August 2024	DF	66	(Saudi Arabia) Abdullah Al-Shaflut	(Saudi Arabia) Al-Nojoom	Free	
1 September 2024	MF	15	(Saudi Arabia) Omar Al-Kreidis	(Saudi Arabia) Al-Qawarah	Free	
1 October 2024	DF	25	(Saudi Arabia) Faisal Abdulrazaq	(Saudi Arabia) Al-Dahab	Free	
1 October 2024	FW	20	(Saudi Arabia) Rakan Al-Dossari	(Saudi Arabia) Al-Washm	Free	
27 January 2025	MF	25	(Saudi Arabia) Omar Shami	(Saudi Arabia) Abha	Free	

=== Loans out ===
Start date	End date	Position	No.	Player	To club	Fee	Ref.
12 September 2023	End of season	DF	2	(Saudi Arabia) Bandar Wohaishi	(Saudi Arabia) Al-Tai	None	

== Pre-season ==
22 July 2024 Friendly	Al-Raed (Saudi Arabia)	2–3	(Ukraine) Zorya Luhansk	Gorišnica, Slovenia
17:30 CEST	Al-Rajeh 14'; Al-Sahli 47'	Report	Dryshlyuk 21'; Benito 23'; Antyukh 61'	Stadium: Športni Center Gorišnica

27 July 2024 Friendly	Al-Raed (Saudi Arabia)	1–5	(Croatia) Varaždin	Varaždin, Croatia
CEST	Sayoud	Report	Dabro, Mitrovski, Poldrugač	Stadium: Gradski Stadion Anđelko Herjavec

31 July 2024 Friendly	Al-Raed (Saudi Arabia)	4–0	(Croatia) Slaven Belupo	Čakovec, Croatia
18:00 CEST	Al-Jayzani; Sayoud; Al-Sahli; Shami			Stadium: Stadion SRC Mladost

4 August 2024 Friendly	Al-Raed (Saudi Arabia)	4–0	(Slovenia) Drava Ptuj	Gorišnica, Slovenia
17:30 CEST	Sayoud,,,	Report		Stadium: Športni Center Gorišnica

15 August 2024 Friendly	Al-Raed (Saudi Arabia)	0–0	(Saudi Arabia) Al-Kholood	Buraidah, Saudi Arabia
19:30 AST		Report		Stadium: Al-Raed Club Stadium

== Competitions ==
=== Overview ===
Competition	Record							
Competition	Pld	W	D	L	GF	GA	GD	Win %
Pro League	34	6	3	25	41	66	−25	17.65
King Cup	4	2	1	1	4	2	+2	50.00
Total	38	8	4	26	45	68	−23	21.05

Updated to match played 26 May 2025
Source: Competitions

=== Pro League ===
==== League table ====
Pos	Team	Pld	W	D	L	GF	GA	GD	Pts	Qualification or relegation
14	Damac	34	9	8	17	37	50	−13	35	
15	Al-Okhdood	34	9	7	18	33	56	−23	34	
16	Al-Wehda (R)	34	9	6	19	42	67	−25	33	Relegation to First Division League
17	Al-Orobah (R)	34	9	3	22	31	74	−43	30	Relegation to First Division League
18	Al-Raed (R)	34	6	3	25	41	66	−25	21	Relegation to First Division League

Source: SPL
Rules for classification: 1) Points; 2) Head-to-head points; 3) Head-to-head goal difference; 4) Total goal difference; 5) Total goals scored; 6) Fair-play points
(Note: Head-to-head record is used only after all the matches between the teams in question have been played).
(R) Relegated

==== Results summary ====
Overall								Home						Away					
Pld	W	D	L	GF	GA	GD	Pts	W	D	L	GF	GA	GD	W	D	L	GF	GA	GD
34	6	3	25	41	66	−25	21	2	2	13	17	33	−16	4	1	12	24	33	−9

Last updated: 26 May 2025.
Source: Saudi Pro League

==== Results by round ====
Round	1	2	3	4	5	6	7	8	9	10	11	12	13	14	15	16	17	18	19	20	21	22	23	24	25	26	27	28	29	30	31	32	33	34
Ground	A	H	A	H	A	A	H	H	A	A	H	H	A	H	A	H	A	H	A	H	A	H	H	A	A	H	H	A	A	H	A	H	A	H
Result	D	L	W	L	L	W	D	W	L	L	W	L	L	L	L	L	L	L	L	L	W	L	D	L	L	L	L	W	L	L	L	L	L	L
Position	11	13	8	10	11	9	11	7	10	11	10	10	12	12	13	15	15	15	16	16	15	16	16	16	18	18	18	18	18	18	18	18	18	18

Updated to match(es) played on 26 May 2025. Source: Saudi Pro League
A = Away; H = Home; W = Win; D = Draw; L = Loss

==== Matches ====
All times are local, AST (UTC+3).

Win Draw Loss Postponed

22 August 2024 1	Al-Nassr	1–1	Al-Raed	Riyadh
21:00	Ronaldo 34'; Brozović (yellow card) 45+6'; Laporte (yellow card) 48'; Al-Ghannam (yellow card) 90+3'	Report	Al-Rajeh (yellow card) 16'; Al-Subaie (yellow card) 20'; M. Al-Dossari (yellow card) 27'; Fouzair 49' (pen.); Gonzalez (yellow card) 56'; Al-Sahli (yellow card) 90+9'	Stadium: Al-Awwal Park; Attendance: 8,951; Referee: Khaled Al-Teris

27 August 2024 2	Al-Raed	0–1	Al-Qadsiah	Buraidah
21:00	Normann (yellow card) 45+3'; Fouzair (yellow card) 71'; Al-Amri (yellow card) 90+7'	Report	Álvarez (yellow card) 45+1'; Qassem (yellow card) 59'; Al-Ammar 79'	Stadium: Al-Raed Club Stadium; Attendance: 1,651; Referee: Mohammed Al-Smail

14 September 2024 3	Al-Fayha	0–5	Al-Raed	Al Majma'ah
18:45	R. Kaabi (yellow card) 17'; Smalling (red card) 55'	Report	Smalling 6' (o.g.); Fouzair 17'; El Berkaoui 45+6', 60'; Al-Amri 66'; Al-Jayzani (yellow card) 73'	Stadium: Al Majma'ah Sports City; Attendance: 794; Referee: Sultan Okairy

21 September 2024 4	Al-Raed	1–2	Al-Riyadh	Buraidah
18:40	M. Al-Dossari (yellow card) 23'; Gonzalez (red card) 27'; Sayoud 71'	Report	Al-Menhali (yellow card) 70'; Selemani 80'; Konaté 90+5'; Al-Aqel (yellow card) 90+9'	Stadium: Al-Raed Club Stadium; Attendance: 1,658; Referee: Abdullah Al-Shehri

29 September 2024 5	Al-Shabab	2–1	Al-Raed	Riyadh
21:00	Hoedt 27'; Al-Sibyani (yellow card) 45+5'; Guanca 65'; Kanabah (yellow card) 81'; Abdullah (yellow card) 90+1'; Kim Seung-gyu (yellow card) 90+4'	Report	Sayoud 14'; Al-Subaie (yellow card) 45+4' (yellow-red card) 53'; Al-Rajeh (yellow card) 90+12'	Stadium: Al-Shabab Club Stadium; Attendance: 5,850; Referee: Abdulsamad Bakri

3 October 2024 6	Al-Ettifaq	0–1	Al-Raed	Dammam
18:00	Hindi (yellow card) 45+6'	Report	Al-Amri 36'; N. Hazazi (yellow card) 47'; Al-Dossari (yellow card) 88'	Stadium: Al-Ettifaq Club Stadium; Attendance: 3,351; Referee: Raed Al-Zahrani

19 October 2024 7	Al-Raed	2–2	Al-Wehda	Buraidah
18:05	Al-Khaibari (yellow card) 41'; Sayoud 53'; Al-Sahli 65'; Abeid (yellow card) 90+4'	Report	Amyn (yellow card) 37'; Noor 47', (yellow card) 69'; Khodari 90+5'	Stadium: Al-Raed Club Stadium; Attendance: 1,284; Referee: Shukri Al-Hanfoush

26 October 2024 8	Al-Raed	2–1	Al-Fateh	Buraidah
18:05	Qasmi (yellow card) 30'; Szappanos 45+2' (o.g.); Abeid (yellow card) 47'; Al-Amri (yellow card) 62'; Saâdane 65' (o.g.); Hawsawi (yellow card) 69'; Sunyur (yellow card) 90+9'	Report	Al-Zaid (yellow card) 26'; Al-Othman (yellow card) 45+1'; Saâdane (yellow card) 63'; Al-Daheem (yellow card) 78'; Al-Anazi 85'	Stadium: Al-Raed Club Stadium; Attendance: 891; Referee: Fareeh Al-Jaloud

1 November 2024 9	Al-Khaleej	4–0	Al-Raed	Dammam
17:35	Al Salem 39', 75', (yellow card) 59'; Kourbelis 45+3', (yellow card) 45+5'; Al Hamsal (yellow card) 72'; Al Dubais 90+1'; Hawsawi (yellow card) 90+6'	Report	Al-Amri (yellow card) 45+5'	Stadium: Prince Mohamed bin Fahd Stadium; Attendance: 2,154; Referee: Mohammed Al-Daqqash

8 November 2024 10	Al-Ahli	2–0	Al-Raed	Jeddah
18:20	Balobaid (yellow card) 28'; Veiga 55'; Kessié (yellow card) 67'; Al-Johani (yellow card) 90+2'; Al-Asmari 90+4'; Majrashi (yellow card) 90+8'	Report	Abeid (yellow card) 41'; Hawsawi (yellow card) 45+3'; Al-Dossari (yellow card) 63'	Stadium: King Abdullah Sports City; Attendance: 19,235; Referee: Sami Al-Jires

23 November 2024 11	Al-Raed	3–1	Al-Orobah	Buraidah
16:20	Al-Amri 18'; El Berkaoui 24', 58'; Sayoud (yellow card) 42'; Hawsawi (yellow card) 77'; Normann (yellow card) 87'	Report	Kandouss 11'; Muhar (yellow card) 53'	Stadium: King Abdullah Sports City; Attendance: 1,302; Referee: Majed Al-Shamrani

30 November 2024 12	Al-Raed	0–1	Al-Taawoun	Buraidah
16:20	Al-Jayzani (yellow card) 37'; Qasmi (yellow card) 73'; Al-Amri (yellow card) 84'	Report	Girotto (yellow card) 45+3'; Adam 78', (yellow card) 79'; El Mahdioui (yellow card) 90+8'	Stadium: King Abdullah Sports City; Attendance: 9,004; Referee: Mohammed Al-Hoaish

7 December 2024 13	Al-Hilal	3–2	Al-Raed	Riyadh
17:40	Milinković-Savić 42'; Mitrović (yellow card) 60'; Leonardo 87'; Al-Bulaihi 90+14'	Report	El Berkaoui 7'; Sayoud (yellow card) 39'; Al-Dossari (yellow card) 59'; Sunbul 77'; Hawsawi (yellow card) 79'; Moreira (yellow card) 81'; Abeid (yellow card) 90+10'	Stadium: Kingdom Arena; Attendance: 16,203; Referee: Tamás Bognár (Hungary)

10 January 2025 14	Al-Raed	0–2	Damac	Buraidah
18:05		Report	Fallatah (yellow card) 41'; Stanciu 44'; Chafaï 90'	Stadium: King Abdullah Sports City; Attendance: 1,847; Referee: Mohammed Al-Smail

16 January 2025 15	Al-Ittihad	4–1	Al-Raed	Jeddah
20:00	Benzema 21'; Hawsawi (yellow card) 35'; Aouar (yellow card) 43', (goal) 77'; Bergwijn 45+7'; Rajković (yellow card) 59'; Al-Aboud 71'	Report	N. Hazazi (yellow card) 49', (goal) 58'; Al-Amri (yellow card) 66'	Stadium: Prince Abdullah Al-Faisal Sports City; Attendance: 14,154; Referee: Sami Al-Jires

20 January 2025 16	Al-Raed	0–2	Al-Okhdood	Buraidah
18:15	Al-Subaie (yellow card) 83'	Report	Pedroza 28'; Bassogog 66'; Al-Qaydhi (yellow card) 87'; Koné (yellow card) 90+1' (yellow-red card) 90+9'	Stadium: King Abdullah Sports City; Attendance: 2,060; Referee: Majed Al-Shamrani

25 January 2025 17	Al-Kholood	2–1	Al-Raed	Ar Rass
16:50	Dieng (yellow card) 16', (goal) 87'; Sawaan 61'; Al-Hammami (yellow card) 88'; Al-Shamrani (yellow card) 90+8'	Report	Sayoud 25'; Abeid (yellow card) 33'; Hawsawi (yellow card) 45+7'; Al-Subaie (yellow card) 90+6'	Stadium: Al-Hazem Club Stadium; Attendance: 1,092; Referee: Abdullah Al-Shehri

30 January 2025 18	Al-Raed	1–2	Al-Nassr	Buraidah
20:00	Abeid (yellow card) 45+2'; Al-Rajeh (yellow card) 45+4'; Sayoud 76', (yellow card) 90+5'	Report	Ângelo (yellow card) 2'; Ronaldo 35'; Brozović (yellow card) 44'; Boushal 47'; Al-Ghannam (yellow card) 69'; Bento (yellow card) 86'; Al-Sulaiheem (yellow card) 87'; Al-Hassan (yellow card) 90+10'	Stadium: King Abdullah Sports City; Attendance: 9,165; Referee: Donatas Rumšas (Lithuania)

6 February 2025 19	Al-Qadsiah	2–0	Al-Raed	Dammam
18:05	Aubameyang 45+3'; Álvarez (yellow card) 57'; Aboulshamat (yellow card) 64'; Al-Qahtani (yellow card) 68'; Quiñones 90+6'; Fernández (yellow card) 90+9'	Report	A. Hazazi (yellow card) 21' (yellow-red card) 48'; Al-Yousef (yellow card) 43'; Sunyur (yellow card) 74'; Abeid (yellow card) 90+2'; Bouzok (yellow card) 90+4'	Stadium: Prince Mohamed bin Fahd Stadium; Attendance: 3,296; Referee: Duje Strukan (Croatia)

15 February 2025 20	Al-Raed	0–2	Al-Fayha	Buraidah
18:30	Al-Rajeh (yellow card) 32'	Report	Al-Beshe (yellow card) 12'; Al-Abdulmenem (yellow card) 45+3'; Sakala 58' (pen.); Abdi 61'; Onyekuru (yellow card) 70'; Shukurov (yellow card) 90+13'	Stadium: King Abdullah Sports City; Attendance: 1,002; Referee: Khalid Al-Turais

20 February 2025 21	Al-Riyadh	1–3	Al-Raed	Riyadh
20:00	Tozé 53'; Al-Shehri (yellow card) 79'	Report	Al-Amri 18', (yellow card) 72'; El Berkaoui 31', (yellow card) 71'; Normann (yellow card) 62' (yellow-red card) 71'; Tweh (yellow card) 64'; Sayoud 85'; Al-Dossari (yellow card) 90+13'; Sunbul (yellow card) 90+15'	Stadium: Prince Faisal bin Fahd Sports City Stadium; Attendance: 704; Referee: Mohammed Al-Ismail

25 February 2025 22	Al-Raed	1–2	Al-Shabab	Buraidah
17:10	Tweh (yellow card) 58'; Abeid 70'	Report	Guanca 29', 88'; Renan (yellow card) 55'	Stadium: King Abdullah Sports City; Attendance: 1,804; Referee: Abdullah Al-Kharboush

2 March 2025 23	Al-Raed	1–1	Al-Ettifaq	Buraidah
22:00	Normann (yellow card) 45+1', (goal) 64'; Hawsawi (yellow card) 52'; Bouzok (yellow card) 75'	Report	Abdulrahman (yellow card) 45+3'; Al-Olayan (yellow card) 65'; Madu (yellow card) 72'; Al-Malki (yellow card) 90+4'; Al-Khateeb 90+9'	Stadium: Al-Raed Club Stadium; Attendance: 1,141; Referee: Fareeh Al-Jaloud

6 March 2025 24	Al-Wehda	3–1	Al-Raed	Mecca
22:00	Bguir 24'; Al-Alaeli (yellow card) 32'; Al-Hejji (yellow card) 48'; Ighalo 76'; Amyn (yellow card) 78'; Al Makahasi (yellow card) 82'; Crețu 90'	Report	El Berkaoui 16'; Al-Dossari (yellow card) 71'; Qasmi (yellow card) 86'	Stadium: King Abdulaziz Sports City; Attendance: 247; Referee: Faisal Al-Blwi

13 March 2025 25	Al-Fateh	3–1	Al-Raed	Al-Hasa
22:00	Saâdane (yellow card) 14'; Vargas 27', 60'; Fernandes (yellow card) 55'; Batna 65' (pen.)	Report	Qasmi (yellow card) 62'; Gonzalez 82'	Stadium: Al-Fateh Club Stadium; Attendance: 7,558; Referee: Majed Al-Shamrani

6 April 2025 26	Al-Raed	1–2	Al-Khaleej	Buraidah
19:00	El Berkaoui 27'; Al-Amri (yellow card) 34'	Report	Hawsawi (yellow card) 53', (goal) 71'; Al-Khabrani (yellow card) 61'; Fortounis (yellow card) 77', (goal) 90+7'; Aboulshamat (yellow card) 90+10'	Stadium: Al-Raed Club Stadium; Attendance: 2,041; Referee: Khalid Al-Turais

11 April 2025 27	Al-Raed	0–2	Al-Ahli	Buraidah
19:00	Al-Jayzani (yellow card) 27'; Al-Rajeh (yellow card) 45+5'; Al-Yousef (yellow card) 86'	Report	Majrashi (yellow card) 22'; Kessié 28' (pen.); Veiga 66'	Stadium: King Abdullah Sports City; Attendance: 2,437; Referee: Tamás Bognár (Hungary)

19 April 2025 28	Al-Orobah	0–4	Al-Raed	Sakakah
19:25	Al-Shuwaish (yellow card) 32'; Young (yellow card) 59'	Report	El Berkaoui 45+1'; Abeid 49'; Sayoud 54'; Bouzok 57'	Stadium: Al Jouf University Stadium; Attendance: 2,933; Referee: Abdullah Al-Shehri

24 April 2025 29	Al-Taawoun	4–3	Al-Raed	Buraidah
21:00	Girotto 30'; Martínez 40' (pen.), (yellow card) 83'; Al-Yousef 45+6' (o.g.); Al-Ahmed 49'; Sabiri (yellow card) 77'; Rivas (yellow card) 90+10'	Report	Sayoud 22' (pen.); Al-Yousef (yellow card) 37'; Al-Rajeh (yellow card) 48'; Qasmi 54'; El Berkaoui (yellow card) 66'; Gonzalez 74'	Stadium: King Abdullah Sports City; Attendance: 16,277; Referee: Majed Al-Shamrani

7 May 2025 30	Al-Raed	3–5	Al-Hilal	Buraidah
19:15	El Berkaoui 45+3', 68'; Sayoud (yellow card) 73'; Al-Amri 90+9' (pen.)	Report	Mitrović 32'; S. Al-Dawsari 41', 59', 78'; Kanno (yellow card) 63'; Malcom 66'; Al-Tombakti (yellow card) 90+5'	Stadium: King Abdullah Sports City; Attendance: 7,387; Referee: Donatas Rumšas (Lithuania)

11 May 2025 31	Damac	1–0	Al-Raed	Khamis Mushait
19:10	Solan (yellow card) 34'; Hamed (yellow card) 43'; Al-Sibyani (yellow card) 45+5'; Al-Nemer 74'; Abdullah (yellow card) 90+8'	Report	Al-Jayzani (yellow card) 39'; Hawsawi (yellow card) 45+6'; Al-Rajeh (yellow card) 47'; El Berkaoui (yellow card) 70'	Stadium: Damac Club Stadium; Attendance: 1,428; Referee: Khalid Al-Turais

15 May 2025 32	Al-Raed	1–3	Al-Ittihad	Buraidah
21:00	Gonzalez 9'; A. Hazazi (yellow card) 38'; Abeid (yellow card) 74'	Report	Bergwijn 21'; Pereira 40'; Al-Aboud 47'; Fabinho (yellow card) 68'; Al-Bishi (yellow card) 81'	Stadium: King Abdullah Sports City; Attendance: 18,796; Referee: Rade Obrenovič (Slovenia)

22 May 2025 33	Al-Okhdood	1–0	Al-Raed	Najran
19:05	Godwin 56'; Pedroza (yellow card) 81'; Barry (yellow card) 83'	Report	A. Hazazi (yellow card) 67'; Al-Sayil (yellow card) 90+7'	Stadium: Prince Hathloul bin Abdulaziz Sports City; Attendance: 867; Referee: Darío Herrera (Argentina)

26 May 2025 34	Al-Raed	1–2	Al-Kholood	Buraidah
21:00	Al-Yousef (yellow card) 33'; Al-Amri (yellow card) 35', (goal) 73'; Gonzalez (red card) 39'; Hawsawi (yellow card) 82'	Report	Al-Hammami (yellow card) 19'; Muleka 45+4'; N'Doram (yellow card) 51'; Maolida 70'; Sawaan (yellow card) 90+6'	Stadium: Al-Raed Club Stadium; Attendance: 471; Referee: Ali Al-Qahtani

=== King Cup ===
All times are local, AST (UTC+3).

25 September 2024 Round of 32	Jeddah	0–2	Al-Raed	Jeddah
21:00		Report	Qasmi (yellow card) 4'; Fouzair 17' (pen.); El Berkaoui 45+4'; Al-Sahli (yellow card) 68'; Sanyor (yellow card) 82'; N. Hazazi (yellow card) 89'	Stadium: Prince Abdullah Al-Faisal Sports City; Referee: Bandar Al-Qahtani

29 October 2024 Round of 16	Al-Najma	0–1	Al-Raed	Buraidah
18:00	Al-Bawardi (red card) 31'; Al-Qahtani (yellow card) 34'; Aouacheria (yellow card) 46'; Al-Muwallad (yellow card) 90+1'	Report	Qasmi (yellow card) 12'; Hawsawi (yellow card) 30'; Al-Amri 38'; Al-Rajeh (yellow card) 45+1'; Normann (yellow card) 45+11'	Stadium: King Abdullah Sports City; Attendance: 1,038; Referee: Mohammed Al-Ismail

6 January 2025 Quarter-finals	Al-Raed	1–1 (a.e.t.) (4–3 p)	Al-Jabalain	Buraidah
15:30	Al-Dossari (yellow card) 25'; Al-Jayzani (yellow card) 38'; Gonzalez (yellow card) 53'; Al-Amri 61', (yellow card) 71'; Sayoud (yellow card) 84'; Abeid (yellow card) 86'	Report	Narváez (yellow card) 85'; Al-Johani (yellow card) 86'; Al-Mutairi 90', (yellow card) 90+6'	Stadium: Al-Raed Club Stadium; Attendance: 1,934; Referee: Khalid Al-Teris
	Penalties
	Hawsawi (penalty scored); Al-Amri (penalty scored); Al-Subaie (penalty missed); Al-Dossari (penalty scored); Gonzalez (penalty scored)		(penalty scored) Jobson; (penalty scored) Narváez; (penalty missed) Bukhari; (penalty scored) Al-Mohammadi; (penalty missed) Mendes

2 April 2025 Semi-finals	Al-Qadsiah	1–0	Al-Raed	Dammam
21:00	Álvarez (yellow card) 90+1'; Aubameyang 90+2'	Report	Al-Dossari (yellow card) 39'; Al-Jayzani (yellow card) 54'	Stadium: Prince Mohamed bin Fahd Stadium; Attendance: 10,074; Referee: Urs Schnyder (Switzerland)

== Statistics ==
=== Appearances ===
Last updated on 26 May 2025.

No.	Pos	Nat	Player	Total		Pro League		King Cup	
No.	Pos	Nat	Player	Apps	Goals	Apps	Goals	Apps	Goals
Goalkeepers
1	GK	(Portugal) POR	André Moreira	15	0	13	0	2	0
23	GK	(Saudi Arabia) KSA	Basil Al-Enezi	0	0	0	0	0	0
30	GK	(Saudi Arabia) KSA	Saleh Al-Ohaymid	2	0	1+1	0	0	0
31	GK	(Egypt) EGY	Abdelrahman Sherif	0	0	0	0	0	0
50	GK	(Saudi Arabia) KSA	Meshari Sanyor	23	0	20	0	2+1	0
55	GK	(Saudi Arabia) KSA	Feras Al-Rajhi	0	0	0	0	0	0
Defenders
4	DF	(Saudi Arabia) KSA	Abdullah Hazazi	22	0	12+7	0	1+2	0
12	DF	(Saudi Arabia) KSA	Zakaria Hawsawi	24	0	18+3	0	3	0
13	DF	(Saudi Arabia) KSA	Abdullah Al-Yousef	22	0	10+9	0	0+3	0
16	DF	(Morocco) MAR	Ayoub Qasmi	30	1	26+1	1	3	0
21	DF	(Cameroon) CMR	Oumar Gonzalez	30	3	27	3	3	0
24	DF	(Saudi Arabia) KSA	Khalid Al-Subaie	20	0	8+9	0	1+2	0
28	DF	(Saudi Arabia) KSA	Hamad Al-Jayzani	23	0	17+4	0	2	0
32	DF	(Saudi Arabia) KSA	Mohammed Al-Dossari	26	0	21+1	0	4	0
47	DF	(Saudi Arabia) KSA	Mubarak Al-Shayie	0	0	0	0	0	0
52	DF	(Saudi Arabia) KSA	Tamim Al-Shuqayran	1	0	0+1	0	0	0
94	DF	(Saudi Arabia) KSA	Mubarak Al-Rajeh	29	0	22+4	0	2+1	0
Midfielders
5	MF	(Liberia) LBR	Salomon Tweh	13	0	10+3	0	0	0
7	MF	(Algeria) ALG	Amir Sayoud	29	8	26	8	2+1	0
8	MF	(Norway) NOR	Mathias Normann	25	1	21+1	1	3	0
10	MF	(Morocco) MAR	Mohamed Fouzair	7	3	6	2	1	1
15	MF	(Saudi Arabia) KSA	Saleh Al-Amri	37	8	30+3	6	4	2
17	MF	(Algeria) ALG	Mehdi Abeid	32	2	28+1	2	3	0
18	MF	(Saudi Arabia) KSA	Naif Hazazi	24	1	11+9	1	2+2	0
42	MF	(Saudi Arabia) KSA	Anas Al-Zahrani	7	0	0+5	0	1+1	0
45	MF	(Saudi Arabia) KSA	Yahya Sunbul	21	1	4+16	1	0+1	0
Forwards
9	FW	(Saudi Arabia) KSA	Raed Al-Ghamdi	12	0	0+10	0	0+2	0
11	FW	(Morocco) MAR	Karim El Berkaoui	25	12	20+2	11	2+1	1
26	FW	(Algeria) ALG	Yousri Bouzok	21	1	20	1	1	0
34	FW	(Saudi Arabia) KSA	Azim Al-Sayil	2	0	0+2	0	0	0
41	FW	(Saudi Arabia) KSA	Nawaf Al-Sahli	16	1	1+13	1	1+1	0
48	FW	(Saudi Arabia) KSA	Faisal Nahet	4	0	0+4	0	0	0
70	FW	(Sierra Leone) SLE	Moses Turay	5	0	0+5	0	0	0
99	FW	(Saudi Arabia) KSA	Thamer Al-Khaibari	21	0	3+15	0	1+2	0
Players sent out on loan this season
2	DF	(Saudi Arabia) KSA	Bandar Wohaishi	1	0	0+1	0	0	0
43	DF	(Saudi Arabia) KSA	Abdullah Al-Rawdhan	0	0	0	0	0	0
Player who made an appearance this season but left the club
20	FW	(Saudi Arabia) KSA	Rakan Al-Dossari	2	0	0+2	0	0	0
25	MF	(Saudi Arabia) KSA	Omar Shami	4	0	0+3	0	0+1	0
77	MF	(Saudi Arabia) KSA	Bassam Al-Hamad	0	0	0	0	0	0

=== Goalscorers ===
Rank	No.	Pos	Nat	Name	Pro League	King Cup	Total
1	11	FW	(Morocco)	Karim El Berkaoui	11	1	12
2	7	MF	(Algeria)	Amir Sayoud	8	0	8
2	15	MF	(Saudi Arabia)	Saleh Al-Amri	6	2	8
4	10	MF	(Morocco)	Mohamed Fouzair	2	1	3
4	21	DF	(Cameroon)	Oumar Gonzalez	3	0	3
6	17	MF	(Algeria)	Mehdi Abeid	2	0	2
6	8	MF	(Norway)	Mathias Normann	1	0	1
6	16	DF	(Morocco)	Ayoub Qasmi	1	0	1
6	18	MF	(Saudi Arabia)	Naif Hazazi	1	0	1
6	26	FW	(Algeria)	Yousri Bouzok	1	0	1
6	41	FW	(Saudi Arabia)	Nawaf Al-Sahli	1	0	1
6	45	MF	(Saudi Arabia)	Yahya Sunbul	1	0	1
Own goal					3	0	3
Total					41	4	45

Last Updated: 26 May 2025

=== Assists ===
Rank	No.	Pos	Nat	Name	Pro League	King Cup	Total
1	7	MF	(Algeria)	Amir Sayoud	7	0	7
2	12	DF	(Saudi Arabia)	Zakaria Hawsawi	5	1	6
2	26	FW	(Algeria)	Yousri Bouzok	6	0	6
4	15	MF	(Saudi Arabia)	Saleh Al-Amri	3	0	3
5	5	MF	(Liberia)	Salomon Tweh	1	0	1
5	8	MF	(Norway)	Mathias Normann	1	0	1
5	21	DF	(Cameroon)	Oumar Gonzalez	0	1	1
5	32	DF	(Saudi Arabia)	Mohammed Al-Dossari	1	0	1
5	94	DF	(Saudi Arabia)	Mubarak Al-Rajeh	1	0	1
Total					25	2	27

Last Updated: 26 May 2025

=== Clean sheets ===
Rank	No.	Pos	Nat	Name	Pro League	King Cup	Total
1	50	GK	(Saudi Arabia)	Meshari Sanyor	2	2	4
2	1	GK	(Portugal)	André Moreira	1	0	1
Total					3	2	5

Last Updated: 19 April 2025
