= 2023–24 Al-Raed FC season =

Al-Raed
2023–24 season
- Chairman: Fahad Al-Motawa'a
- Manager: Igor Jovićević
- Stadium: King Abdullah Sport City Stadium
- SPL: 12th
- King Cup: Round of 32 (knocked out by Al-Najma)
- Top goalscorer: League: Karim El Berkaoui (12); All: Karim El Berkaoui (13)
- Highest home attendance: 20,630 (vs. Al-Hilal, 24 August 2023)
- Lowest home attendance: 1,453 (vs. Damac, 15 December 2023)
- Average home league attendance: 6,342
- All statistics correct as of 27 May 2024.

The 2023–24 season was Al-Raed's 70th year in their history and 16th consecutive season in the Pro League. The club participated in the Pro League and the King Cup.

The season covers the period from 1 July 2023 to 30 June 2024.

== Players ==
=== Squad information ===
As of 1 February 2024

Note: Flags indicate national team as defined under FIFA eligibility rules; some limited exceptions apply. Players may hold more than one non-FIFA nationality.

No.	Pos.	Nation	Player
1	GK	POR	André Moreira
2	DF	KSA	Bandar Wohaishi
3	DF	KSA	Saud Al-Dossari
5	MF	SEN	Mamadou Loum (on loan from Porto)
6	MF	KSA	Abdullah Majrashi
7	MF	ALG	Amir Sayoud
8	MF	NOR	Mathias Normann
9	FW	KSA	Raed Al-Ghamdi
10	MF	MAR	Mohamed Fouzair
11	FW	MAR	Karim El Berkaoui
13	MF	KSA	Omar Shami
14	MF	KSA	Mansor Al-Beshe
17	FW	CPV	Júlio Tavares
18	MF	KSA	Naif Hazazi
19	DF	KSA	Abdullah Al-Fahad
20	FW	KSA	Rakan Al-Dossari

No.	Pos.	Nation	Player
21	DF	CMR	Oumar Gonzalez
23	GK	KSA	Ahmed Al-Rehaili
24	DF	KSA	Khalid Al-Subaie
25	DF	KSA	Faisal Abdulrazaq
28	DF	KSA	Hamad Al-Jayzani
32	DF	KSA	Mohammed Al-Dossari
41	FW	KSA	Nawaf Al-Sahli
42	MF	KSA	Anas Al-Zahrani
43	DF	KSA	Abdullah Al-Yousef
45	MF	KSA	Yahya Sunbul
49	MF	KSA	Firas Al-Ghamdi
50	GK	KSA	Meshari Sanyor
51	MF	KSA	Mohammed Al-Hazmi
55	MF	KSA	Nasser Al-Hadhood (on loan from Al-Hilal)
77	MF	KSA	Bassam Al-Hamad
94	DF	KSA	Mubarak Al-Rajeh

=== Out on loan ===
Note: Flags indicate national team as defined under FIFA eligibility rules; some limited exceptions apply. Players may hold more than one non-FIFA nationality.

No.	Pos.	Nation	Player
66	DF	KSA	Abdullah Al-Shaflut (at Al-Najma until 30 June 2024)

== Transfers and loans ==
=== Transfers in ===
Entry date	Position	No.	Player	From club	Fee	Ref.
30 June 2023	FW	77	(Saudi Arabia) Rayan Al-Marshoud	(Saudi Arabia) Al-Rayyan	End of loan	
7 July 2023	DF	2	(Saudi Arabia) Bandar Wohaishi	(Saudi Arabia) Al-Hilal	Free	
8 July 2023	MF	7	(Algeria) Amir Sayoud	(Saudi Arabia) Al-Tai	Free	
10 July 2023	DF	24	(Saudi Arabia) Khalid Al-Subaie	(Saudi Arabia) Al-Qaisumah	Free	
13 July 2023	DF	28	(Saudi Arabia) Hamad Al-Jayzani	(Saudi Arabia) Al-Wehda	Free	
10 August 2023	GK	1	(Portugal) André Moreira	(Switzerland) Grasshoppers	Free	
11 August 2023	MF	49	(Saudi Arabia) Firas Al-Ghamdi	(Saudi Arabia) Al-Ahli	Free	
17 August 2023	DF	21	(Cameroon) Oumar Gonzalez	(France) Ajaccio	Free	
20 August 2023	MF	8	(Norway) Mathias Normann	(Russia) Rostov	Free	
8 September 2023	DF	43	(Saudi Arabia) Abdullah Al-Yousef	(Saudi Arabia) Al-Fateh	Undisclosed	

=== Loans in ===
Start date	End date	Position	No.	Player	From club	Fee	Ref.
7 July 2023	End of season	MF	55	(Saudi Arabia) Nasser Al-Hadhood	(Saudi Arabia) Al-Hilal	None	
10 August 2023	End of season	MF	5	(Senegal) Mamadou Loum	(Portugal) Porto	None	

=== Transfers out ===
Exit date	Position	No.	Player	To club	Fee	Ref.
30 June 2023	MF	82	(Romania) Alexandru Mitriță	(United States) New York City	End of loan	
1 July 2023	DF	27	(Saudi Arabia) Awadh Khamis	(Saudi Arabia) Al-Okhdood	Free	
1 July 2023	MF	88	(Croatia) Damjan Đoković	(Romania) FCSB	Free	
11 July 2023	MF	44	(Saudi Arabia) Sultan Al-Farhan	(Saudi Arabia) Al-Ittihad	Free	
20 July 2023	MF	7	(Saudi Arabia) Abdulmalek Al-Shammeri	(Saudi Arabia) Al-Taawoun	Free	
29 July 2023	DF	4	(Saudi Arabia) Khaled Al-Khathlan	(Saudi Arabia) Al-Batin	Free	
6 August 2023	GK	1	(Romania) Silviu Lung Jr.	(Romania) Politehnica Iași	Free	
14 August 2023	DF	12	(Saudi Arabia) Mohammed Salem	(Saudi Arabia) Al-Kawkab	Free	
9 September 2023	MF	74	(Saudi Arabia) Abdulmohsen Al-Qahtani	(Saudi Arabia) Al-Riyadh	Free	
18 September 2023	FW	47	(Saudi Arabia) Abdulrahman Al-Ghamdi	(Saudi Arabia) Al-Suqoor	Free	
22 October 2023	MF	8	(Saudi Arabia) Yahya Al-Shehri	(Saudi Arabia) Al-Riyadh	Free	

=== Loans out ===
Start date	End date	Position	No.	Player	To club	Fee	Ref.
13 September 2023	End of season	DF	66	(Saudi Arabia) Abdullah Al-Shaflut	(Saudi Arabia) Al-Najma	None	

== Pre-season ==
14 July 2023 Friendly	Al-Raed (Saudi Arabia)	0–2	Iran U23	Kartepe, Turkey
17:00 TRT		Report		Stadium: The Green Park Kartepe Resort

19 July 2023 Friendly	Al-Raed (Saudi Arabia)	1–1	(Saudi Arabia) Al-Adalah	Kartepe, Turkey
17:30 TRT	Sunbul 66'	Report	Yoda 61'	Stadium: The Green Park Kartepe Resort

22 July 2023 Friendly	Al-Raed (Saudi Arabia)	0–1	(Bahrain) Al-Khaldiya	Sapanca, Turkey
18:00 TRT		Report	Frioui	Stadium: Sapanca Bakır Spor Kompleksi

27 July 2023 Friendly	Al-Raed (Saudi Arabia)	0–4	(Saudi Arabia) Al-Khaleej	Kartepe, Turkey
18:00 TRT		Report	Jung Woo-young; López; Al-Majhad; Rodrigues	Stadium: The Green Park Kartepe Resort

== Competitions ==
=== Overview ===
Competition	Record							
Competition	G	W	D	L	GF	GA	GD	Win %
Pro League	34	9	10	15	41	49	−8	26.47
King Cup	1	0	0	1	1	2	−1	0.00
Total	35	9	10	16	42	51	−9	25.71

Updated to match played 27 May 2024
Source: Competitions

=== Pro League ===
==== League table ====
Pos	Team	Pld	W	D	L	GF	GA	GD	Pts
10	Damac	34	10	11	13	44	45	−1	41
11	Al-Khaleej	34	9	10	15	36	47	−11	37 (Note: Al-Khaleej finished ahead of Al-Raed on head-to-head points: Al-Khaleej: 4 pts, Al-Raed: 1 pts (Al-Khaleej 0–0 Al-Raed, Al-Raed 0–1 Al-Khaleej).)
12	Al-Raed	34	9	10	15	41	49	−8	37
13	Al-Wehda	34	10	6	18	45	60	−15	36
14	Al-Riyadh	34	8	11	15	33	57	−24	35

Source: SPL
Rules for classification: 1) Points; 2) Head-to-head points; 3) Head-to-head goal difference; 4) Total goal difference; 5) Total goals scored; 6) Fair-play points
(Note: Head-to-head record is used only after all the matches between the teams in question have been played).

==== Results summary ====
Overall								Home						Away					
Pld	W	D	L	GF	GA	GD	Pts	W	D	L	GF	GA	GD	W	D	L	GF	GA	GD
34	9	10	15	41	49	−8	37	5	4	8	20	25	−5	4	6	7	21	24	−3

Last updated: 27 May 2024.
Source: spl.com.sa

==== Results by round ====
Round	1	2	3	4	5	6	7	8	9	10	11	12	13	14	15	16	17	18	19	20	21	22	23	24	25	26	27	28	29	30	31	32	33	34
Ground	H	A	H	H	A	H	A	H	A	A	H	A	H	A	H	A	H	A	H	A	A	H	A	H	A	H	H	A	H	A	H	A	H	A
Result	L	L	L	W	D	L	L	L	D	L	L	D	W	L	W	D	L	W	W	L	D	L	W	D	W	L	W	L	D	L	D	W	D	D
Position	18	18	18	13	14	15	16	17	17	18	18	18	17	17	17	15	17	15	13	14	14	15	13	13	12	13	13	13	13	13	13	12	12	12

Updated to match(es) played on 27 May 2024. Source: spl.com.sa
A = Away; H = Home; W = Win; D = Draw; L = Loss

==== Matches ====
All times are local, AST (UTC+3).

Win Draw Loss Postponed

14 August 2023 1	Al-Raed	0–3	Al-Ittihad	Buraidah
18:00		Report	Hamdallah 58'; Coronado 73', 79'	Stadium: King Abdullah Sport City Stadium; Attendance: 4,149; Referee: Luís Godinho (Portugal)

19 August 2023 2	Abha	1–0	Al-Raed	Abha
18:00	Al-Jumayah (yellow card) 13'; Naji (yellow card) 53'; Al-Ruwaili 57'; Matić (yellow card) 87'	Report	Tavares (yellow card) 17'; Loum (yellow card) 61'	Stadium: Prince Sultan bin Abdul Aziz Stadium; Attendance: 817; Referee: Mohammed Al-Hoaish

24 August 2023 3	Al-Raed	0–4	Al-Hilal	Buraidah
21:00	Gonzalez (yellow card) 45+1' (yellow-red card) 78'; Al-Fahad (yellow card) 82'	Report	Mitrović 42'; S. Al-Dawsari 56' (pen.), 69'; Milinković-Savić (red card) 76'; Al-Hamdan 89'	Stadium: King Abdullah Sport City Stadium; Attendance: 20,630; Referee: César Arturo Ramos (Mexico)

28 August 2023 4	Al-Raed	3–0	Al-Riyadh	Buraidah
21:00	Fouzair 18', 45+2'; Sayoud 68'; M. Al-Dossari (yellow card) 76'; Al-Jayzani (yellow card) 84'	Report	Ndong (yellow card) 29'; Arslanagić (yellow card) 90+6'	Stadium: King Abdullah Sport City Stadium; Attendance: 3,870; Referee: Faisal Al-Blwi

1 September 2023 5	Al-Fayha	0–0	Al-Raed	Al Majma'ah
18:00	Al-Rashidi (yellow card) 38'	Report	Al-Beshe (yellow card) 24'; Wohaishi (yellow card) 69'; Sayoud (yellow card) 90+5'	Stadium: Al Majma'ah Sports City; Attendance: 1,134; Referee: Shukri Al-Hanfoush

16 September 2023 6	Al-Raed	1–3	Al-Nassr	Buraidah
18:00	M. Al-Dossari (yellow card) 8'; Wohaishi (red card) 45+2'; Fouzair 89' (pen.)	Report	Al-Khaibari (yellow card) 44'; Mané 45+1'; Talisca 49'; Al-Hassan (yellow card) 59'; Ronaldo 78'; Telles (yellow card) 84'; Al-Amri (yellow card) 87'	Stadium: King Abdullah Sport City Stadium; Attendance: 19,710; Referee: Wilmar Roldán (Colombia)

21 September 2023 7	Al-Taawoun	2–1	Al-Raed	Buraidah
18:00	Pedro 9', (yellow card) 41'; Al-Ahmed 16'; Girotto (yellow card) 84'	Report	Gonzalez 39'; M. Al-Dossari (yellow card) 61'; Al-Beshe (yellow card) 79'	Stadium: King Abdullah Sport City Stadium; Attendance: 8,079; Referee: Mohammed Al-Hoaish

30 September 2023 8	Al-Raed	1–2	Al-Okhdood	Buraidah
18:00	El Berkaoui 29'; Loum (yellow card) 66'; Hazazi (yellow card) 90+8'	Report	Burcă (yellow card) 4', (goal) 83' (pen.); Godwin 21', (yellow card) 63'; Al-Muwallad (yellow card) 77'	Stadium: King Abdullah Sport City Stadium; Attendance: 1,618; Referee: Shukri Al-Hanfoush

7 October 2023 9	Al-Khaleej	0–0	Al-Raed	Dammam
21:00	Rodrigues (yellow card) 48'; Sherif (yellow card) 90'	Report	El Berkaoui (yellow card) 66'; Al-Subaie (yellow card) 83'; Gonzalez (yellow card) 90+1'; Normann (yellow card) 90+3'	Stadium: Prince Mohamed bin Fahd Stadium; Attendance: 2,053; Referee: Khaled Al-Teris

21 October 2023 10	Al-Hazem	4–3	Al-Raed	Ar Rass
18:00	Selemani 6', 42'; Al-Thani 36'; Badamosi 72'	Report	Sayoud 10', 45+10'; R. Al-Ghamdi (yellow card) 79'; Gonzalez 86'	Stadium: Al-Hazem Club Stadium; Attendance: 532; Referee: Fareeh Al-Jaloud

27 October 2023 11	Al-Raed	1–2	Al-Fateh	Buraidah
18:00	Normann (yellow card) 24'; Al-Jayzani (yellow card) 57'; Al-Beshe (yellow card) 62'; El Berkaoui 69' (pen.); M. Al-Dossari (yellow card) 80'	Report	Buhimed 28'; Al-Mogren (yellow card) 30'; Tello 45+3'; Al-Zubaidi (yellow card) 75'; Rinne (yellow card) 90+5'	Stadium: King Abdullah Sport City Stadium; Attendance: 2,220; Referee: Raed Al-Zahrani

4 November 2023 12	Al-Ettifaq	0–0	Al-Raed	Dammam
21:00	Abdulrahman (yellow card) 32'; Henderson (yellow card) 55'; Al-Khateeb (yellow card) 85'	Report	Fouzair (yellow card) 10'; Al-Jayzani (yellow card) 71'; Hazazi (yellow card) 90+5'; F. Al-Ghamdi (yellow card) 90+6'	Stadium: Al-Ettifaq Club Stadium; Attendance: 12,356; Referee: Majed Al-Shamrani

9 November 2023 13	Al-Raed	2–1	Al-Shabab	Buraidah
18:00	El Berkaoui 6'; Tavares 55'; Al-Jayzani (yellow card) 80'	Report	Al-Yami (yellow card) 67'; Bahebri (yellow card) 89'; Saïss 90+3'	Stadium: Al-Taawoun Club Stadium; Attendance: 4,275; Referee: Mamdouh Al Shahdan

24 November 2023 14	Al-Tai	4–3	Al-Raed	Ha'il
21:00	Asiri (yellow card) 25'; Mensah 45' (pen.), 90+9' (pen.); Cordea (yellow card) 82'; Al-Fahad 90+2' (o.g.); Misidjan 90+10'	Report	Tavares 12' (pen.); Sunbul 27'; Al-Beshe (yellow card) 30' (yellow-red card) 45+1'; Wohaishi (yellow card) 59'; El Berkaoui 72'	Stadium: Prince Abdul Aziz bin Musa'ed Stadium; Attendance: 4,112; Referee: Abdulsamad Bakri

2 December 2023 15	Al-Raed	2–0	Al-Wehda	Buraidah
21:00	Fouzair 44' (pen.), (yellow card) 45+8'; Sayoud 68'; Al-Subaie (yellow card) 85'	Report	I. Hawsawi (red card) 27'; Anselmo (yellow card) 45'; Ighalo (yellow card) 90+2'	Stadium: King Abdullah Sport City Stadium; Attendance: 1,520; Referee: Abdulrahman Al-Sultan

9 December 2023 16	Al-Ahli	0–0	Al-Raed	Taif
18:00	Hamidou (yellow card) 3'; Al-Majhad (yellow card) 90+5'	Report	Sayoud (yellow card) 90+14'; Moreira (yellow card) 90+14'; Fouzair (yellow card) 90+15'	Stadium: King Fahd Sports City; Attendance: 11,332; Referee: Kirill Levnikov (Russia)

15 December 2023 17	Al-Raed	0–1	Damac	Buraidah
18:00	Loum (yellow card) 22'; Al-Jayzani (yellow card) 54'; Normann (yellow card) 90+6'	Report	Antolić (yellow card) 17'; Al-Zain (yellow card) 37'; Nkoudou 42'	Stadium: King Abdullah Sport City Stadium; Attendance: 1,453; Referee: Mohammed Abu Shaqarah

23 December 2023 18	Al-Ittihad	1–3	Al-Raed	Mecca
21:00	Al-Olayan (red card) 12'; Romarinho 25'; Camara (yellow card) 88'; Al-Amri (yellow card) 90+7'	Report	El Berkaoui 22', 72'; Al-Subaie (yellow card) 45+1'; M. Al-Dossari 90'	Stadium: King Abdul Aziz Stadium; Attendance: 3,650; Referee: Sami Al-Jires

29 December 2023 19	Al-Raed	4–3	Abha	Buraidah
18:00	Al-Subaie 21'; Gonzalez (yellow card) 40', (goal) 90+7'; Fouzair 46'; El Berkaoui 50'; Al-Jayzani (yellow card) 66'	Report	Al-Ali 17', 45+3'; Matić (yellow card) 30'; Al-Sahafi (yellow card) 59'; Noguera 67'; Natiq (yellow card) 77'	Stadium: King Abdullah Sport City Stadium; Attendance: 3,015; Referee: Shukri Al-Hanfoush

18 February 2024 20	Al-Hilal	3–1	Al-Raed	Riyadh
17:00	Mitrović 3', 29' (pen.); Michael (yellow card) 40'; Al-Bulaihi (yellow card) 42'; Koulibaly 52'; Lodi (yellow card) 61'; Al-Faraj (yellow card) 90+2'	Report	Sayoud 90+6'	Stadium: Kingdom Arena; Attendance: 15,051; Referee: Andris Treimanis (Latvia)

23 February 2024 21	Al-Riyadh	1–1	Al-Raed	Riyadh
17:00	Assiri (yellow card) 45'; Al-Shuwayrikh (yellow card) 55'; Musona 82'	Report	El Berkaoui 38', (yellow card) 57'; Fouzair (yellow card) 89'	Stadium: Prince Faisal bin Fahd Stadium; Attendance: 292; Referee: Mohammed Al-Hoaish

29 February 2024 22	Al-Raed	1–2	Al-Fayha	Buraidah
17:00	Tavares 55'; Al-Rajeh (yellow card) 61'; Normann (red card) 62'	Report	Al-Harthi 50'; Konan (yellow card) 66'; Sakala 76'; R. Kaabi (yellow card) 79'	Stadium: Al-Raed Club Stadium; Attendance: 4,746; Referee: Raed Al-Zahrani

7 March 2024 23	Al-Nassr	1–3	Al-Raed	Riyadh
20:00	Yahya 24'	Report	El Berkaoui 18'; Fouzair 46', (yellow card) 61'; Al-Jayzani (yellow card) 67'; Moreira (yellow card) 85'; Sayoud 87'; R. Al-Ghamdi (yellow card) 90+1'; M. Al-Dossari (yellow card) 90+5'; Al-Rajeh (yellow card) 90+11'	Stadium: Al-Awwal Park; Attendance: 17,409; Referee: Abdullah Al-Kharboush

16 March 2024 24	Al-Raed	0–0	Al-Taawoun	Buraidah
22:00	Al-Jayzani (yellow card) 45+2'; Gonzalez (yellow card) 45+6'	Report	Al-Abdulrazzaq (yellow card) 45+3'; Flávio (yellow card) 90+8'	Stadium: King Abdullah Sport City Stadium; Attendance: 15,473; Referee: Faisal Al-Blwi

29 March 2024 25	Al-Okhdood	1–3	Al-Raed	Najran
22:00	Burcă 20' (pen.); Vítor (yellow card) 28'; Pedroza (yellow card) 55'; Al-Muwallad (yellow card) 90+7'	Report	El Berkaoui 15', (yellow card) 81'; Fouzair 31'; Tavares 56'	Stadium: Prince Hathloul bin Abdul Aziz Sports City; Attendance: 576; Referee: Shukri Al-Hanfoush

1 April 2024 26	Al-Raed	0–1	Al-Khaleej	Buraidah
22:00		Report	López (yellow card) 23'; Narey 28'; Al-Torais (yellow card) 31'	Stadium: Al-Raed Club Stadium; Attendance: 3,408; Referee: Mamdouh Al-Shahdan

7 April 2024 27	Al-Raed	2–0	Al-Hazem	Buraidah
22:00	Tavares 35', 46'; El Berkaoui (yellow card) 82'	Report	Al Mohaimed (yellow card) 45+3'; Viana (yellow card) 82'	Stadium: Al-Raed Club Stadium; Attendance: 2,782; Referee: Ahmed Al-Rumaikhani

18 April 2024 28	Al-Fateh	3–1	Al-Raed	Al-Hasa
21:00	Djaniny 7', 60'; Zelarayán 12'; Saâdane (yellow card) 63'	Report	Loum (yellow card) 24'; Al-Jayzani (yellow card) 26'; Shami (yellow card) 39'; Tavares 56'; Hazazi (yellow card) 73'	Stadium: Al-Fateh Club Stadium; Attendance: 7,575; Referee: Mamdouh Al Shahdan

27 April 2024 29	Al-Raed	2–2	Al-Ettifaq	Buraidah
18:00	El Berkaoui 10'; Al-Fahad (yellow card) 63'; Gonzalez (yellow card) 69'; Normann 90+6'	Report	Al-Otaibi (yellow card) 3'; Gray (yellow card) 68'; Dembélé 71'; Al-Aboud (yellow card) 86'; Camara 90+2'	Stadium: Al-Raed Club Stadium; Attendance: 2,712; Referee: Abdulrahman Al-Sultan

4 May 2024 30	Al-Shabab	2–0	Al-Raed	Riyadh
18:00	Carrasco (yellow card) 44', (goal) 81'; Carlos 56'; Santos (yellow card) 62'	Report	Al-Fahad (yellow card) 35'; Al-Beshe (yellow card) 66'; Loum (yellow card) 90' (yellow-red card) 90+8'	Stadium: Al-Shabab Club Stadium; Attendance: 6,548; Referee: Raed Al-Zahrani

11 May 2024 31	Al-Raed	1–1	Al-Tai	Buraidah
18:00	Al-Fahad (yellow card) 5'; Fouzair (yellow card) 45+7', (goal) 51'; Al-Jayzani (yellow card) 89'	Report	Abdullah (yellow card) 21'; Al-Nakhli 29'; Bauer (yellow card) 65'; Al-Toiawy (yellow card) 90'	Stadium: Al-Raed Club Stadium; Attendance: 4,674; Referee: Majed Al-Shamrani

16 May 2024 32	Al-Wehda	0–1	Al-Raed	Mecca
21:00	Anselmo (yellow card) 45+4'	Report	El Berkaoui 86', (yellow card) 87'; Normann (yellow card) 89'	Stadium: King Abdul Aziz Stadium; Attendance: 753; Referee: Shukri Al-Hanfoush

23 May 2024 33	Al-Raed	0–0	Al-Ahli	Buraidah
21:00	Al-Fahad (yellow card) 63'; Al-Subaie (yellow card) 80'	Report		Stadium: King Abdullah Sports City Stadium; Attendance: 11,563; Referee: Rade Obrenović (Slovenia)

27 May 2024 34	Damac	1–1	Al-Raed	Khamis Mushait
21:00	Chafaï 7'; Solan (yellow card) 80'	Report	Al-Jayzani (yellow card) 60'; Gonzalez (yellow card) 70'; M. Al-Dossari (yellow card) 78'; Hawsawi 89' (o.g.)	Stadium: Damac Club Stadium; Attendance: 316; Referee: Abdulsamad Bakri

=== King Cup ===
All times are local, AST (UTC+3).

25 September 2023 Round of 32	Al-Najma	2–1	Al-Raed	Unaizah
18:00	Barry 11'; Cariús 13'; Al-Khaibari (yellow card) 71'; Tilica (yellow card) 90+7'	Report	Wohaishi (yellow card) 25'; F. Al-Ghamdi (yellow card) 41'; El Berkaoui 60'; Al-Jayzani (yellow card) 68'; M. Al-Dossari (yellow card) 90+7'; Al-Beshe (yellow card) 90+8'	Stadium: Department of Education Stadium; Referee: Sultan Al-Okairy

== Statistics ==
=== Appearances ===
Last updated on 27 May 2024.

No.	Pos	Nat	Player	Total		Pro League		King Cup	
No.	Pos	Nat	Player	Apps	Goals	Apps	Goals	Apps	Goals
Goalkeepers
1	GK	(Portugal) POR	André Moreira	30	0	29	0	1	0
23	GK	(Saudi Arabia) KSA	Ahmed Al-Rehaili	5	0	5	0	0	0
50	GK	(Saudi Arabia) KSA	Meshari Sanyor	0	0	0	0	0	0
Defenders
2	DF	(Saudi Arabia) KSA	Bandar Wohaishi	13	0	9+3	0	1	0
3	DF	(Saudi Arabia) KSA	Saud Al-Dossari	1	0	0+1	0	0	0
19	DF	(Saudi Arabia) KSA	Abdullah Al-Fahad	19	0	14+5	0	0	0
21	DF	(Cameroon) CMR	Oumar Gonzalez	32	3	31	3	0+1	0
24	DF	(Saudi Arabia) KSA	Khalid Al-Subaie	30	1	27+3	1	0	0
25	DF	(Saudi Arabia) KSA	Faisal Abdulrazaq	0	0	0	0	0	0
28	DF	(Saudi Arabia) KSA	Hamad Al-Jayzani	29	0	24+4	0	0+1	0
32	DF	(Saudi Arabia) KSA	Mohammed Al-Dossari	30	1	29	1	1	0
43	DF	(Saudi Arabia) KSA	Abdullah Al-Yousef	13	0	8+4	0	1	0
94	DF	(Saudi Arabia) KSA	Mubarak Al-Rajeh	14	0	8+5	0	1	0
Midfielders
5	MF	(Senegal) SEN	Mamadou Loum	29	0	27+2	0	0	0
6	MF	(Saudi Arabia) KSA	Abdullah Majrashi	4	0	0+4	0	0	0
7	MF	(Algeria) ALG	Amir Sayoud	27	6	25+2	6	0	0
8	MF	(Norway) NOR	Mathias Normann	23	1	22	1	1	0
10	MF	(Morocco) MAR	Mohamed Fouzair	27	8	25+2	8	0	0
13	MF	(Saudi Arabia) KSA	Omar Shami	3	0	1+2	0	0	0
14	MF	(Saudi Arabia) KSA	Mansor Al-Beshe	32	0	25+6	0	1	0
18	MF	(Saudi Arabia) KSA	Naif Hazazi	18	0	2+15	0	1	0
42	MF	(Saudi Arabia) KSA	Anas Al-Zahrani	0	0	0	0	0	0
45	MF	(Saudi Arabia) KSA	Yahya Sunbul	24	1	11+12	1	0+1	0
49	MF	(Saudi Arabia) KSA	Firas Al-Ghamdi	16	0	5+10	0	1	0
51	MF	(Saudi Arabia) KSA	Mohammed Al-Hazmi	0	0	0	0	0	0
55	MF	(Saudi Arabia) KSA	Nasser Al-Hadhood	1	0	0+1	0	0	0
77	MF	(Saudi Arabia) KSA	Bassam Al-Hamad	2	0	0+1	0	1	0
Forwards
9	FW	(Saudi Arabia) KSA	Raed Al-Ghamdi	13	0	1+11	0	0+1	0
11	FW	(Morocco) MAR	Karim El Berkaoui	31	13	26+4	12	1	1
17	FW	(Cape Verde) CPV	Júlio Tavares	29	7	20+9	7	0	0
20	FW	(Saudi Arabia) KSA	Rakan Al-Dossari	6	0	0+6	0	0	0
41	FW	(Saudi Arabia) KSA	Nawaf Al-Sahli	0	0	0	0	0	0
Players sent out on loan this season
66	DF	(Saudi Arabia) KSA	Abdullah Al-Shaflut	2	0	0+2	0	0	0

=== Goalscorers ===
Rank	No.	Pos	Nat	Name	Pro League	King Cup	Total
1	11	FW	(Morocco)	Karim El Berkaoui	12	1	13
2	10	MF	(Morocco)	Mohamed Fouzair	8	0	8
3	17	FW	(Cape Verde)	Júlio Tavares	7	0	7
4	7	MF	(Algeria)	Amir Sayoud	6	0	6
5	21	DF	(Cameroon)	Oumar Gonzalez	3	0	3
6	8	MF	(Norway)	Mathias Normann	1	0	1
6	24	DF	(Saudi Arabia)	Khalid Al-Subaie	1	0	1
6	32	DF	(Saudi Arabia)	Mohammed Al-Dossari	1	0	1
6	45	MF	(Saudi Arabia)	Yahya Sunbul	1	0	1
Own goal					1	0	1
Total					41	1	42

Last Updated: 27 May 2024

=== Assists ===
Rank	No.	Pos	Nat	Name	Pro League	King Cup	Total
1	24	DF	(Saudi Arabia)	Khalid Al-Subaie	6	0	6
2	7	MF	(Algeria)	Amir Sayoud	5	0	5
2	17	FW	(Cape Verde)	Júlio Tavares	5	0	5
4	28	DF	(Saudi Arabia)	Hamad Al-Jayzani	4	0	4
5	32	DF	(Saudi Arabia)	Mohammed Al-Dossari	2	1	3
6	10	MF	(Morocco)	Mohamed Fouzair	2	0	2
6	11	FW	(Morocco)	Karim El Berkaoui	2	0	2
8	2	DF	(Saudi Arabia)	Bandar Wohaishi	1	0	1
8	8	MF	(Norway)	Mathias Normann	1	0	1
Total					28	1	29

Last Updated: 16 May 2024

=== Clean sheets ===
Rank	No.	Pos	Nat	Name	Pro League	King Cup	Total
1	1	GK	(Portugal)	André Moreira	8	0	8
2	23	GK	(Saudi Arabia)	Ahmed Al-Rehaili	2	0	2
Total					10	0	10

Last Updated: 23 May 2024
