= 2024–25 King's Cup (Saudi Arabia) =

Custodian of the Two Holy Mosques Cup

Tournament details
- Country: Saudi Arabia
- Dates: 22 September 2024 – 30 May 2025

Final positions
- Champions: Al-Ittihad (10th title)
- Runners-up: Al-Qadsiah

Tournament statistics
- Matches played: 31
- Goals scored: 89 (2.87 per match)
- Top goal scorer(s): Julián Quiñones (5 goals)

The 2024–25 King's Cup, or The Custodian of the Two Holy Mosques Cup, was the 50th edition of the King's Cup since its establishment in 1957. The tournament began on 22 September 2024 and concluded with the final on 30 May 2025.

The winner qualified to the group stage of the 2025–26 AFC Champions League Two.

Al-Hilal were the two-time defending champions after winning their eleventh title last season. They were eliminated in the quarter-finals by the eventual winners, Al-Ittihad.

== Participating teams ==
A total of 32 teams participated this season, 18 of which competed in the Pro League and 14 in the First Division.

League	Teams
Pro League	Al-Ahli; Al-Ettifaq; Al-Fateh; Al-Fayha; Al-Hilal ^{TH}; Al-Ittihad; Al-Khaleej; Al-Kholood; Al-Nassr; Al-Okhdood; Al-Orobah; Al-Qadsiah; Al-Raed; Al-Riyadh; Al-Shabab; Al-Taawoun; Al-Wehda; Damac
FD League	Abha; Al-Adalah; Al-Ain; Al-Arabi; Al-Batin; Al-Bukiryah; Al-Faisaly; Al-Hazem; Al-Jabalain; Al-Jandal; Al-Najma; Al-Safa; Al-Tai; Jeddah

== Round of 32 ==
The draw for the Round of 32 was held on 12 June 2024. The dates for the Round of 32 fixtures were announced on 19 August 2024. All times are local, AST (UTC+3).

22 September 2024 3	Al-Okhdood (1)	1–2	Al-Arabi (2)	Najran
18:35	Al-Hatila 88'	Report	Quioto 8', 10'	Stadium: Prince Hathloul bin Abdulaziz Sports City; Referee: Mohammed Al-Ghamdi

22 September 2024 2	Al-Qadsiah (1)	4–1	Al-Orobah (1)	Dammam
21:00	Quiñones 10', 51'; Puertas 37'; Aubameyang 90+1'	Report	Guðmundsson 90+6' (pen.)	Stadium: Prince Mohamed bin Fahd Stadium; Referee: Mario Escobar (Guatemala)

22 September 2024 4	Al-Wehda (1)	1–1 (a.e.t.) (4–2 p)	Al-Faisaly (2)	Mecca
21:00	Ighalo 51'	Report	Souza 48'	Stadium: King Abdulaziz Sports City; Referee: Meshal Al-Shehri
	Penalties
	Ighalo (penalty scored); Goodwin (penalty scored); Bacuna (penalty missed); Amyn (penalty scored); Crețu (penalty scored)		(penalty scored) Souza; (penalty missed) Jawshan; (penalty scored) Al-Badah; (penalty missed) M. Majrashi

23 September 2024 8	Al-Fayha (1)	4–0	Al-Batin (2)	Al Majma'ah
18:30	López 30', 68'; Pozuelo 36'; Al-Harthi 47'	Report		Stadium: Al Majma'ah Sports City; Referee: Mohammed Al-Beredi

23 September 2024 7	Al-Hazem (2)	1–2	Al-Nassr (1)	Buraidah
18:35	Al-Sayyali 62'	Report	Mané 45+6'; Boushal 90+2'	Stadium: King Abdullah Sports City; Attendance: 2,361; Referee: Daniel Siebert (Germany)

23 September 2024 10	Al-Tai (2)	5–2 (a.e.t.)	Al-Khaleej (1)	Haʼil
18:45	Al Salem 45' (o.g.); Al-Nakhli 49'; Tandia 99'; Al-Faraj 103'; Tawamba 120'	Report	Al Salem 55'; Fortounis 90+2' (pen.)	Stadium: Prince Abdulaziz bin Musa'ed Sports City; Referee: Turki Hashlan

23 September 2024 1	Al-Ettifaq (1)	2–0	Al-Adalah (2)	Dammam
21:00	Toko Ekambi 78', 90+4'	Report		Stadium: Al-Ettifaq Club Stadium; Attendance: 1,449; Referee: Abdullah Al-Harbi

23 September 2024 5	Al-Ahli (1)	1–2	Al-Jandal (2)	Jeddah
21:00	Toney 82'	Report	Matuq 24'; Amri 30' (pen.)	Stadium: Prince Abdullah Al-Faisal Sports City; Attendance: 6,455; Referee: Abdulrahman Al-Sultan

24 September 2024 11	Al-Bukiryah (2)	0–1	Al-Hilal (1)	Buraidah
18:35		Report	Leonardo 41' (pen.)	Stadium: King Abdullah Sports City; Attendance: 6,313; Referee: Sebastián Zunino (Argentina)

24 September 2024 13	Al-Jabalain (2)	2–0	Al-Fateh (1)	Haʼil
18:45	Narváez 11' (pen.); Al-Absi 68'			Stadium: Prince Abdulaziz bin Musa'ed Sports City; Attendance: 380; Referee: Abdullah Zarban

24 September 2024 9	Al-Ittihad (1)	3–0	Al-Ain (2)	Jeddah
21:00	Al-Shehri 25', 65' (pen.); Al-Refaei 29' (o.g.)	Report		Stadium: Prince Abdullah Al-Faisal Sports City; Attendance: 8,049; Referee: Mohammed Al-Harbi

24 September 2024 12	Al-Kholood (1)	1–3	Al-Shabab (1)	Ar Rass
21:00	Maolida 29'	Report	Bonaventura 36'; Hamdallah 65', 80'	Stadium: Al-Hazem Club Stadium; Attendance: 1,299; Referee: Mohammed Abu Shaqarah

25 September 2024 15	Al-Najma (2)	2–0	Damac (1)	Unaizah
18:35	Tilica 59' (pen.); Aouacheria 85'	Report		Stadium: Department of Education Stadium; Referee: Mohammed Al-Daqqash

25 September 2024 6	Abha (2)	2–3 (a.e.t.)	Al-Taawoun (1)	Khamis Mushait
18:40	Abdu 90+11' (pen.), 120+3'	Report	Flávio 21'; Pedro 92'; Al-Kuwaykibi 99'	Stadium: Damac Club Stadium; Referee: Abdullah Al-Owaidan

25 September 2024 14	Jeddah (2)	0–2	Al-Raed (1)	Jeddah
21:00		Report	Fouzair 17' (pen.); El Berkaoui 45+4'	Stadium: Prince Abdullah Al-Faisal Sports City; Referee: Bandar Al-Qahtani

25 September 2024 16	Al-Safa (2)	1–3	Al-Riyadh (1)	Safwa
21:00	Asprilla 59'	Report	Selemani 19'; Al-Aqel 29', 66'	Stadium: Al-Safa Club Stadium; Referee: Khaled Al-Ahmari

== Round of 16 ==
The draw for the Round of 16 was held on 26 September 2024. The dates for the Round of 16 fixtures were announced on 30 September 2024. All times are local, AST (UTC+3).

28 October 2024 23	Al-Riyadh (1)	0–2	Al-Shabab (1)	Riyadh
17:50		Report	Camara 37'; Bonaventura 90+3'	Stadium: Prince Faisal bin Fahd Sports City Stadium; Referee: Khalid Al-Teris

28 October 2024 20	Al-Ittihad (1)	2–0	Al-Jandal (2)	Jeddah
20:30	Al-Bishi 4'; Al-Aboud 45'	Report		Stadium: Prince Abdullah Al-Faisal Sports City; Attendance: 15,178; Referee: Abdullah Al-Harbi

28 October 2024 22	Al-Wehda (1)	1–2	Al-Qadsiah (1)	Mecca
20:30	Bacuna 7'	Report	Quiñones 37', 45+4'	Stadium: King Abdulaziz Sports City; Referee: Sebastian Gishamer (Austria)

29 October 2024 19	Al-Najma (2)	0–1	Al-Raed (1)	Buraidah
18:00		Report	Al-Amri 38'	Stadium: King Abdullah Sports City; Attendance: 1,038; Referee: Mohammed Al-Ismail

29 October 2024 21	Al-Tai (2)	1–4	Al-Hilal (1)	Haʼil
18:05	Al-Juwaid 7'	Report	Al-Hamdan 5', 49'; Al-Ghannam 38'; Leonardo 53'	Stadium: Prince Abdulaziz bin Musa'ed Sports City; Attendance: 8,295; Referee: Anastasios Papapetrou (Greece)

29 October 2024 17	Al-Nassr (1)	0–1	Al-Taawoun (1)	Riyadh
20:30		Report	Al-Ahmed 71'	Stadium: Al-Awwal Park; Attendance: 14,519; Referee: Rade Obrenovič (Slovenia)

29 October 2024 18	Al-Fayha (1)	1–0	Al-Arabi (2)	Al Majma'ah
20:30	López 42'	Report		Stadium: Al Majma'ah Sports City; Attendance: 127; Referee: Mohammed Al-Beredi

30 October 2024 24	Al-Jabalain (2)	3–1	Al-Ettifaq (1)	Haʼil
18:05	Lacroix 9'; Mendes 57'; Al-Selouli 73'	Report	Vitinho 41' (pen.)	Stadium: Prince Abdulaziz bin Musa'ed Sports City; Referee: Abdullah Al-Shehri

== Quarter-finals ==
The draw for the Quarter-finals was held on 30 October 2024. The dates for the Quarter-finals fixtures were announced on 3 November 2024. All times are local, AST (UTC+3).

6 January 2025 26	Al-Raed (1)	1–1 (a.e.t.) (4–3 p)	Al-Jabalain (2)	Buraidah
15:30	Al-Amri 61'	Report	Al-Mutairi 90'	Stadium: Al-Raed Club Stadium; Attendance: 1,934; Referee: Khalid Al-Teris
	Penalties
	Hawsawi (penalty scored); Al-Amri (penalty scored); Al-Subaie (penalty missed); Al-Dossari (penalty scored); Gonzalez (penalty scored)		(penalty scored) Jobson; (penalty scored) Narváez; (penalty missed) Bukhari; (penalty scored) Al-Mohammadi; (penalty missed) Mendes

6 January 2025 25	Al-Shabab (1)	2–1	Al-Fayha (1)	Riyadh
18:00	Podence 2'; Hamdallah 26'	Report	Al-Rashidi 88'	Stadium: Al-Shabab Club Stadium; Attendance: 4,586; Referee: Sami Al-Jires

7 January 2025 28	Al-Taawoun (1)	0–3	Al-Qadsiah (1)	Buraidah
18:00		Report	Aubameyang 34'; Puertas 36'; Quiñones 49'	Stadium: Al-Raed Club Stadium; Attendance: 3,150; Referee: Radu Petrescu (Romania)

7 January 2025 27	Al-Hilal (1)	2–2 (a.e.t.) (1–3 p)	Al-Ittihad (1)	Riyadh
20:30	Al-Dawsari 72'; Leonardo 101'	Report	Benzema 63', 114'	Stadium: Kingdom Arena; Attendance: 25,129; Referee: Jesús Valenzuela (Venezuela)
	Penalties
	Kanno (penalty missed); Leonardo (penalty missed); Milinković-Savić (penalty scored); Malcom (penalty missed)		(penalty scored) Benzema; (penalty scored) Fabinho; (penalty scored) Pereira

== Semi-finals ==
The draw for the Semi-finals was held on 8 January 2025. The dates for the Semi-finals fixtures were announced on 9 January 2025. All times are local, AST (UTC+3).

1 April 2025 29	Al-Ittihad (1)	3–2	Al-Shabab (1)	Jeddah
21:00	Fabinho 14' (pen.); Pereira 90+2', 90+9'	Report	Guanca 64', 67'	Stadium: Alinma Stadium; Attendance: 46,594; Referee: Sascha Stegemann (Germany)

2 April 2025 30	Al-Qadsiah (1)	1–0	Al-Raed (1)	Dammam
21:00	Aubameyang 90+2'	Report		Stadium: Prince Mohamed bin Fahd Stadium; Attendance: 10,074; Referee: Urs Schnyder (Switzerland)

== Final ==
30 May 2025
21:00 AST

Al-Ittihad	3–1	Al-Qadsiah
Benzema 34', 90+4'; Aouar 43'	Report	Aubameyang 45+6' (pen.)

King Abdullah Sports City, Jeddah
Attendance: 51,331
Referee: Maurizio Mariani (Italy)
