= Mubarak Al-Rajeh =

Saudi Arabian association football player

Personal information
- Full name: Mubarak Abdulrahman Al-Rajeh
- Date of birth: 1 August 2003 (age 23)
- Place of birth: Saudi Arabia
- Position: Centre-back

Team information
- Current team: Al-Shabab
- Number: 94

Youth career
- –2022: Al-Hilal
- 2022: Al-Raed

Senior career*
| Years | Team | Apps | (Gls) |
| 2022–2025 | Al-Raed | 50 | (0) |
| 2025– | Al-Shabab | 9 | (0) |

International career
| 2021–2023 | Saudi Arabia U20 | | |
| 2023– | Saudi Arabia U23 | | |
- * Club domestic league appearances and goals as of 20 May 2026

Mubarak Al-Rajeh (Arabic: مبارك الراجح, born 1 August 2003) is a Saudi Arabian professional footballer who plays as a centre-back for Pro League side Al-Shabab .

== Career ==
Al-Rajeh began his career at the youth team of Al-Raed. On 22 December 2022, Al-Rajeh made his debut for Al-Raed in the King Cup match against Al-Batin. On 26 December 2022, he made his league debut for Al-Raed against the same opponent. On 17 February 2023, Al-Rajeh was called by the Saudi Arabia U20 national team for the 2023 U20 Asian Cup. On 12 July 2023, Al-Rajeh signed his first professional contract with the club.

On 18 August 2025, Al-Rajeh joined Al-Shabab on a four-year deal.

== Career statistics ==
=== Club ===
As of 31 May 2025.

| Club | Season | League | | | Cup | | Continental | | Other | | Total | |
| Club | Season | Division | Apps | Goals | Apps | Goals | Apps | Goals | Apps | Goals | Apps | Goals |
|---|---|---|---|---|---|---|---|---|---|---|---|---|
| Al-Raed | 2022–23 | Pro League | 11 | 0 | 1 | 0 | – | | – | | 12 | 0 |
| Al-Raed | 2023–24 | Pro League | 13 | 0 | 1 | 0 | – | | – | | 14 | 0 |
| Al-Raed | 2024–25 | Pro League | 26 | 0 | 3 | 0 | – | | – | | 29 | 0 |
| Al-Raed | Total | | 50 | 0 | 5 | 0 | 0 | 0 | 0 | 0 | 55 | 0 |
| Al-Shabab | 2025–26 | Pro League | 0 | 0 | 0 | 0 | – | | – | | 0 | 0 |
| Career total | | | 50 | 0 | 5 | 0 | 0 | 0 | 0 | 0 | 55 | 0 |
