= Mathias Normann =

Norwegian footballer (born 1996)

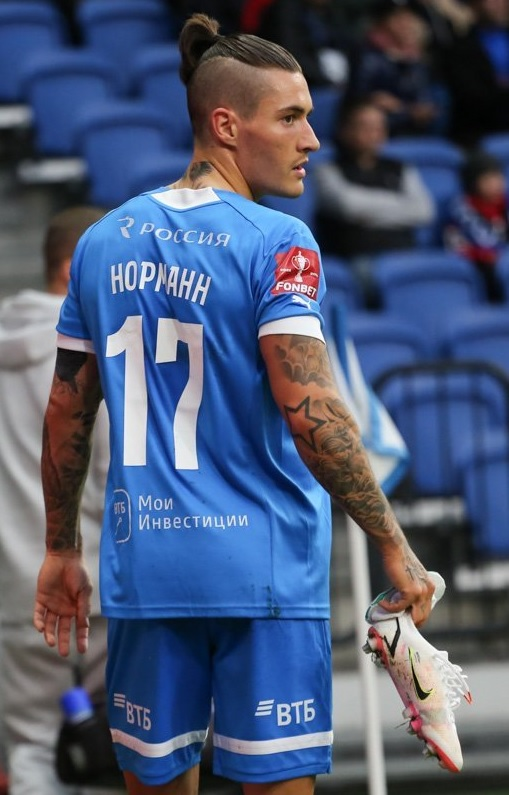
- Normann with Dynamo Moscow in 2022

Personal information
- Full name: Mathias Antonsen Normann
- Date of birth: 28 May 1996 (age 30)
- Place of birth: Svolvær, Norway
- Height: 1.79 m (5 ft 10 in)
- Position: Defensive midfielder

Team information
- Current team: Al-Sailiya
- Number: 17

Youth career
- Svolvær
- Lofoten

Senior career*
Years	Team	Apps	(Gls)
2012	Lofoten	5	(1)
2013–2017	Bodø/Glimt	34	(0)
2015	→ Alta (loan)	16	(2)
2017–2019	Brighton & Hove Albion	0	(0)
2017–2018	→ Molde (loan)	15	(1)
2019–2023	Rostov	51	(2)
2021–2022	→ Norwich City (loan)	23	(1)
2022–2023	→ Dynamo Moscow (loan)	15	(0)
2023–2025	Al-Raed	44	(2)
2025–	Al-Sailiya	9	(0)
2026	→ Al-Gharafa (loan)	2	(0)

International career^{‡}
2013	Norway U17	2	(0)
2014	Norway U18	1	(0)
2017	Norway U21	1	(0)
2019–2022	Norway	12	(1)
- * Club domestic league appearances and goals as of 8 November 2026 ‡ National team caps and goals as of 28 March 2022

Mathias Antonsen Normann (born 28 May 1996) is a Norwegian professional footballer who plays as a defensive midfielder for Al-Sailiya. He has also represented the Norway national team.

== Club career ==
Normann was born in Svolvær. He made his senior debut for Bodø/Glimt on 24 April 2014 against Tverlandet; Bodø/Glimt won 5–0. Normann played for Lofoten before he joined Bodø/Glimt.

On 16 August 2017, Normann joined Molde FK on loan until the end of the 2017 season. On 26 January 2018, Molde announced that Normann's loan deal had been extended until the summer of 2018.

On 28 January 2019, he signed with the Russian Premier League club FC Rostov.

On 29 August 2021, he joined English club Norwich City on loan for the 2021–22 season, with an option to purchase.

On 16 August 2022, Normann moved on loan to Lecce in Italy. On 18 August 2022, the Italian club announced Normann wouldn't be part of the team due to bureaucratic reasons.

On 6 September 2022, Normann joined Dynamo Moscow on loan with an option to buy.

In August 2023, he terminated the contract with FC Rostov and FC Dynamo unilaterally and left Russia. As the reason, fears for their safety due to the UAV attack on Moscow City were named. Subsequently, FIFA ordered Normann to pay compensation to Rostov.

On 20 August 2023, Normann joined Saudi Pro League club Al-Raed.

== International career ==
Normann made his debut for the Norway national team on 5 September 2019 in a 2020 Euro qualifier against Malta, as a 76th-minute substitute for Stefan Johansen.

After he signed a contract with Russian side Dynamo Moscow, the Norwegian Football Federation banned him from playing for Norway. Norwegian manager Ståle Solbakken said: "We'll see if Mathias one day returns to the Norwegian national team, but right now it is completely out of the question", seemingly referring to the Russian invasion of Ukraine.

== Personal life ==
In August 2024, Russian singer Lusya Chebotina confirmed her relationship with Normann.

== Career statistics ==
=== Club ===
As of match played 8 November 2026

Appearances and goals by club, season and competition
Club	Season	League			National cup (Note: Includes Norwegian Cup, Russian Cup, FA Cup, King Cup)		Continental		Total	
Club	Season	Division	Apps	Goals	Apps	Goals	Apps	Goals	Apps	Goals
Lofoten	2012	3. divisjon	5	1	0	0	–		5	1
Bodø/Glimt	2013	Adeccoligaen	0	0	0	0	–		0	0
Bodø/Glimt	2014	Tippeligaen	0	0	1	0	–		1	0
Bodø/Glimt	2015	Tippeligaen	0	0	0	0	–		0	0
Bodø/Glimt	2016	Tippeligaen	27	0	6	3	–		33	3
Bodø/Glimt	2017	Norwegian First Division	7	0	1	0	–		8	0
Bodø/Glimt	Total		34	0	8	3	–		42	3
Alta (loan)	2015	2. divisjon	16	2	1	0	–		17	2
Brighton & Hove Albion	2017–18	Premier League	0	0	0	0	–		0	0
Brighton & Hove Albion	2018–19	Premier League	0	0	0	0	–		0	0
Brighton & Hove Albion	Total		0	0	0	0	–		0	0
Molde (loan)	2017	Eliteserien	5	0	2	0	–		7	0
Molde (loan)	2018	Eliteserien	10	1	1	0	–		11	1
Molde (loan)	Total		15	1	3	0	–		18	1
Rostov	2018–19	Russian Premier League	9	0	2	0	–		11	0
Rostov	2019–20	Russian Premier League	23	1	1	0	–		24	1
Rostov	2020–21	Russian Premier League	15	1	1	0	1 (Note: Appearance in UEFA Europa League)	0	17	1
Rostov	2021–22	Russian Premier League	4	0	0	0	0	0	4	0
Rostov	Total		51	2	4	0	1	0	56	2
Norwich City (loan)	2021–22	Premier League	23	1	2	0	—		25	1
Dynamo Moscow (loan)	2022–23	Russian Premier League	14	0	2	0	—		16	0
Dynamo Moscow (loan)	2023–24	Russian Premier League	1	0	0	0	–		1	0
Dynamo Moscow (loan)	Total		15	0	2	0	–		17	0
Al Raed	2023–24	Saudi Pro League	22	1	1	0	—		23	1
Al Raed	2024–25	Saudi Pro League	22	1	3	0	—		25	1
Al Raed	Total		44	2	4	0	0	0	48	2
Al-Sailiya	2025–26	Qatar Stars League	6	0	0	0	—		6	0
Al-Sailiya	2026–27	Qatar Stars League	3	0	0	0	—		3	0
Al-Sailiya	Total		9	0	0	0	–		9	0
Al-Gharafa (loan)	2025–26	Qatar Stars League	2	0	1	0	2	0	5	0
Career total			214	9	25	3	3	0	242	11

=== International ===
As of 28 March 2022

Appearances and goals by national team and year
National team	Year	Apps	Goals
Norway	2019	2	0
Norway	2020	5	1
Norway	2021	4	0
Norway	2022	1	0
Total		12	1

Scores and results list Norway's goal tally first, score column indicates score after each Normann goal

List of international goals scored by Mathias Normann
No.	Date	Venue	Opponent	Score	Result	Competition
1	8 October 2020	Ullevaal Stadion, Oslo, Norway	Serbia	1–1	1–2	UEFA Euro 2020 qualifying play-offs
