= Amir Sayoud =

Algerian footballer (born 1990)

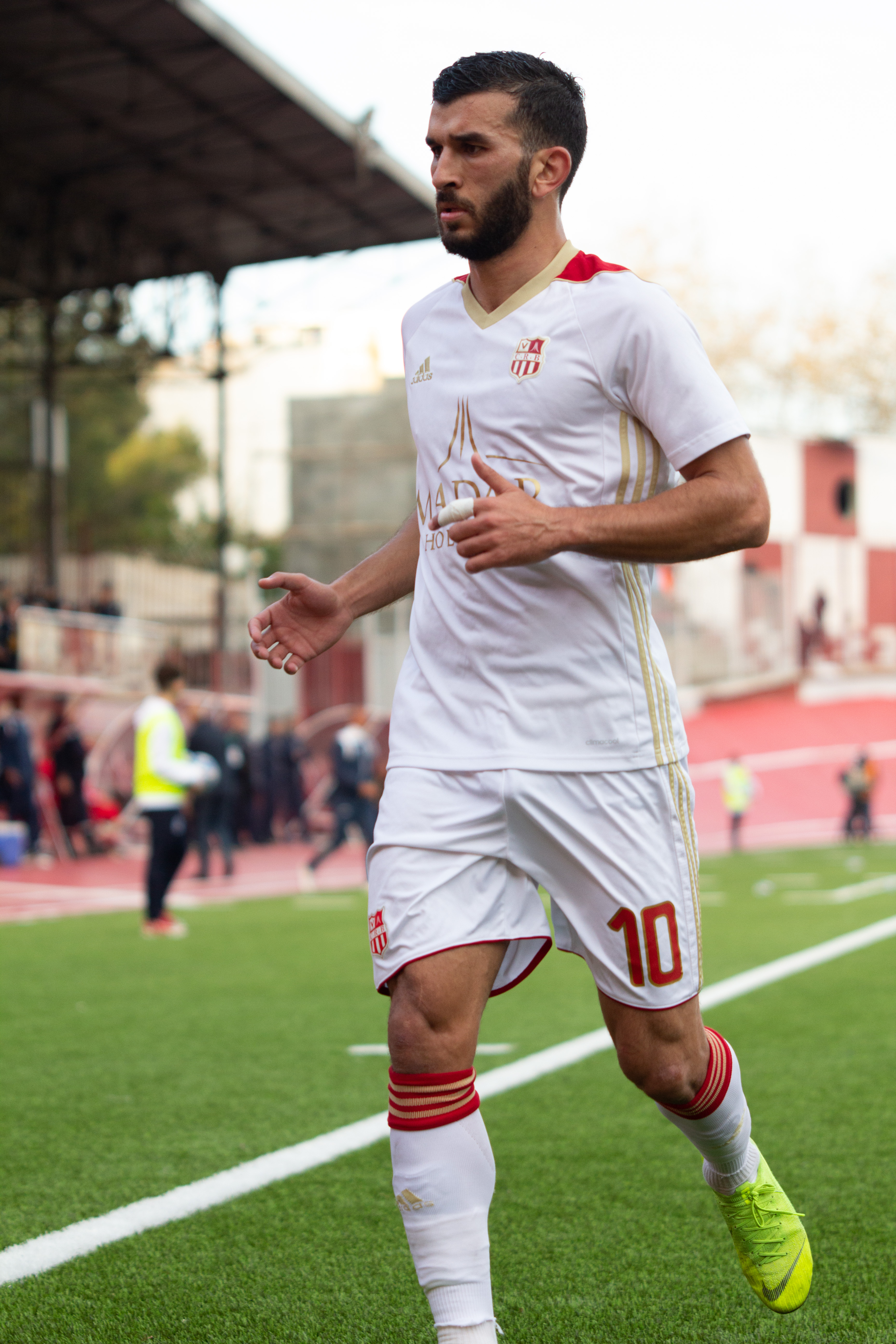

Personal information
- Full name: Amir Sayoud
- Date of birth: 30 September 1990 (age 36)
- Place of birth: Guelma, Algeria
- Height: 1.74 m (5 ft 9 in)
- Position: Attacking midfielder

Team information
- Current team: Al-Hazem
- Number: 10

Youth career
- Nasr El Fedjoudj
- Rapid de Guelma
- ES Guelma
- 2007–2008: ES Sétif
- 2008–2009: Al Ahly

Senior career*
Years	Team	Apps	(Gls)
2009–2013	Al Ahly	12	(0)
2010-2011	→ Al Arabi (loan)	18	(3)
2011-2012	→ Ismaily (loan)	1	(0)
2012-2013	→ MC Alger (loan)	5	(1)
2013-2014	Beroe Stara Zagora	17	(2)
2014-2015	CS Sfaxien	12	(0)
2015–2016	DRB Tadjenanet	29	(7)
2016–2018	USM Alger	40	(1)
2019–2021	CR Belouizdad	62	(27)
2021–2023	Al-Tai	48	(15)
2023–2025	Al-Raed	54	(14)
2025–	Al-Hazem	26	(4)

International career^{‡}
2009–2011	Algeria U20	2	(0)
2011-2013	Algeria U23	8	(1)
2021–	Algeria	5	(1)
Medal record
Men's football
Representing Algeria
FIFA Arab Cup
Winner	2021 Qatar
- * Club domestic league appearances and goals as of 20:39, 22 October 2026 (UTC) ‡ National team caps and goals as of 06 December 2025

Amir Sayoud (Arabic: أمير سعيود; born 30 September 1990) is an Algerian professional footballer who plays as an attacking midfielder for Saudi Pro League club Al-Hazem and the Algeria national team.

== Career ==
=== Youth career ===
Born in Guelma, Sayoud began his career in 2002 in the youth ranks of local club Nasr El Fedjoudj. He then played for Rapid de Guelma and ES Guelma before moving to ES Sétif.

While at Sétif, he saw a television commercial for try outs being held in Algiers for the 'Play Maker Academy' in Ismaïlia, Egypt. Of the 80 people trying out, Sayoud made the top 5 and was sent to train with 108 other players from the Arab world in Ismaïlia. After four months of training, only 35 players were chosen to stay; Sayoud was among them. The remaining players continued training and participating in matches with Sayoud being chosen as the top player among the group.

He was approached by a number of clubs including Al-Ahly, Ismaily, Al-Ahli Dubai and Al Ain. Sayoud decided to join Al-Ahli Dubai, signing a 4-year contract with the club. During his brief time in the United Arab Emirates, his potential was quickly identified by Egyptian club Al-Ahly.

=== Al-Ahly ===
==== 2009–2010: Senior debut ====
On 23 June 2009, Al-Ahly announced the signing of Sayoud on a five-year contract. Al-Ahly were set to loan him out to Alexandria-based club Ittihad as the club was going to sign Moroccan striker Abdessalam Benjelloun, and the Egyptian Premier League sets a three-foreigner player quota for every team. With Gilberto and Francis Doe, the signature of Benjelloun would put the club over the limit. However, Al-Ahly decided to cancel the deal with Benjelloun and registered Sayoud in the squad list for the 2009–10 season.

He made his debut with the first team in the second league game against El Geish on 11 September 2009 coming on as a substitute for Francis Doe in the 75th minute. After only 10 minutes in his debut, he gained his first yellow card. After his debut, he commented on the important event in his playing career: "I'm really looking forward to playing again, I would like to thank the coaching staff for giving me this opportunity. I promise to repay their faith and live up to expectations."

==== 2010: Loan to Al Arabi ====
On 26 January 2010, Sayoud was loaned out by Al-Ahly to Kuwaiti-side Al Arabi until the end of the season. He made six league appearances, scoring one goal. During his time with the club, he also helped Al Arabi reach the final of the 2010 Kuwait Crown Prince Cup where they lost to Kuwait SC.

==== 2010–2011: Return to Al-Ahly ====
At the end of the season, Sayoud returned to Al-Ahly where he received the number 31 shirt. On 4 November 2010, Sayoud played his second match for Al-Ahly against ENPPI Club as a substitute for Hossam Ghaly at the half-time.

==== 2011: Loan to Al-Ismaily ====
On 15 September 2011, Sayoud was loaned out to Ismaily SC until the end of the season. On 20 September 2011, Sayoud made his debut for Ismaily as a second-half substitute in an Egyptian Cup match against Beni Suef, providing an assist for Mohamed Abougrisha on the 4th goal in a 4–0 Ismaily win.

In September 2012, Sayoud went on trial with German 2.Bundesliga side MSV Duisburg.

In July 2015, Sayoud signed with newly promoted Algerian Ligue Professionnelle 1 club DRB Tadjenanet.

=== Saudi Arabia ===
On 8 July 2023, Sayoud joined Al-Raed on a free transfer from Al-Tai.

On 26 August 2025, Sayoud joined Al-Hazem following Al-Raed's relegation.

== International career ==
On 3 June 2011, Sayoud made his official debut for the Algeria national under-23 team in a 2012 Summer Olympics qualifier against Zambia. Sayoud started the game and delivered two assists as Algeria went on to win 3–0. On 16 November 2011, he was selected as part of Algeria's squad for the 2011 CAF U-23 Championship in Morocco.

== Career statistics ==
=== Club ===
As of match played 16 January 2025

Club	Season	League			National cup (Note: Includes Bulgarian Cup, Tunisian Cup, Algerian Cup)		Continental		Other		Total	
Club	Season	Division	Apps	Goals	Apps	Goals	Apps	Goals	Apps	Goals	Apps	Goals
Beroe Stara Zagora	2012–13	Bulgarian First League	11	2	3	0	—		—		14	2
Beroe Stara Zagora	2013–14	Bulgarian First League	6	0	—		—		—		6	0
Beroe Stara Zagora	Total		17	2	3	0	0	0	0	0	20	2
CS Sfaxien	2013–14	Tunisian Ligue 1	12	0	1	0	—		—		13	0
DRB Tadjenanet	2015–16	Algerian Ligue 1	29	7	2	0	—		—		31	7
USM Alger	2016–17	Algerian Ligue 1	19	1	2	1	2 (Note: Appearances in CAF Champions League)	1	—		23	3
USM Alger	2017–18	Algerian Ligue 1	13	0	3	1	5 (Note: Four appearances in CAF Champions League, one appearance in CAF Confederation Cup)	0	—		21	1
USM Alger	2018–19	Algerian Ligue 1	8	0	—		4 (Note: Appearances in CAF Confederation Cup)	1	—		12	1
USM Alger	Total		40	1	5	2	11	2	0	0	56	5
CR Belouizdad	2018–19	Algerian Ligue 1	13	3	6	3	—		—		19	6
CR Belouizdad	2019–20	Algerian Ligue 1	18	5	3	1	4	3	—		25	9
CR Belouizdad	2020–21	Algerian Ligue 1	31	19	—		11	8	2 (Note: One appearance and one goal in Algerian Super Cup, one appearance in Algerian League Cup)	1	44	28
CR Belouizdad	Total		62	27	9	4	15	11	2	1	88	43
Al-Tai	2021–22	Saudi Pro League	21	5	0	0	—		—		21	5
Al-Tai	2022–23	Saudi Pro League	27	10	0	0	—		—		27	10
Al-Tai	Total		48	15	0	0	0	0	0	0	48	15
Al-Raed	2023–24	Saudi Pro League	28	6	0	0	—		—		28	6
Al-Raed	2024–25	Saudi Pro League	14	3	2	0	—		—		16	3
Al-Raed	Total		42	9	2	0	0	0	0	0	44	9
Career total			250	61	20	6	26	13	2	1	298	81

=== International ===
No.	Date	Venue	Opponent	Score	Result	Competition
1	18 December 2021	Al Bayt Stadium, Al Khor, Qatar	Tunisia	1–0	2–0 (a.e.t.)	2021 FIFA Arab Cup Final

== Honours ==
Algeria

- FIFA Arab Cup: 2021
