= Zakaria Hawsawi =

Saudi Arabian footballer (born 2001)

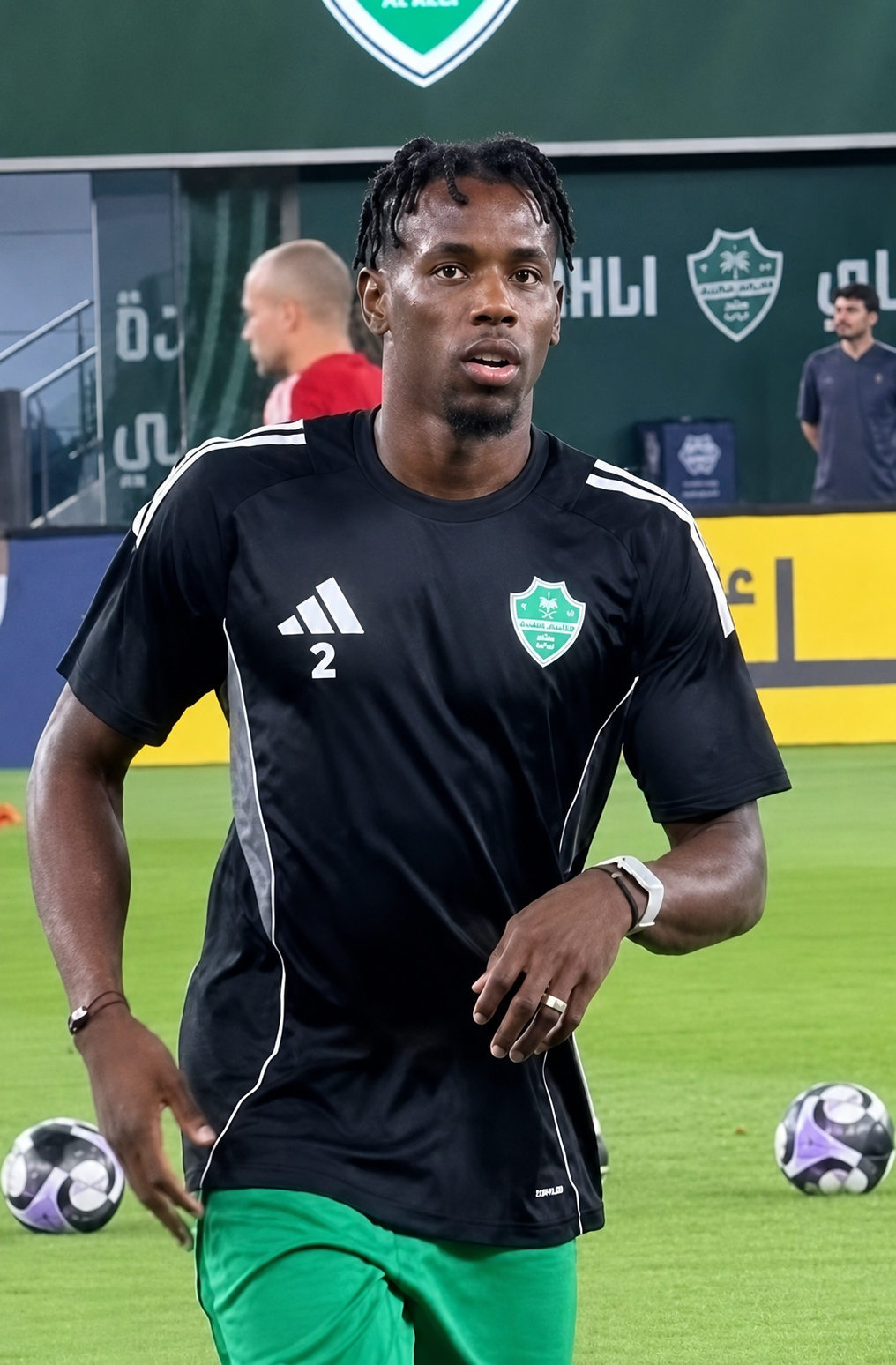
- Hawsawi plays Al-Ahli in 2026

Personal information
- Full name: Zakaria Seraj Hawsawi
- Date of birth: 12 January 2001 (age 25)
- Place of birth: Medina, Saudi Arabia
- Height: 1.73 m (5 ft 8 in)
- Position: Left back

Team information
- Current team: Al-Ahli (on loan from Al-Raed)
- Number: 2

Youth career
- Ohod

Senior career*
Years	Team	Apps	(Gls)
2021–2023	Ohod	36	(0)
2022–2023	→ Al-Ittihad (loan)	16	(0)
2023–2024	Al-Ittihad	10	(1)
2024–	Al-Raed	21	(0)
2025–	→ Al-Ahli (loan)	29	(1)

International career^{‡}
2022–	Saudi Arabia U23	4	(0)
2022–	Saudi Arabia	3	(0)
Medal record
Men's football
Representing Saudi Arabia
Islamic Solidarity Games
Silver medal – second place	2021 Konya
- * Club domestic league appearances and goals as of 20 November 2026 ‡ National team caps and goals as of 29 September 2026

Zakaria Seraj Hawsawi (Arabic: زكريا سراج هوساوي; born 12 January 2001) is a Saudi Arabian professional footballer who plays as a left back for Al-Ahli, on loan from Al-Raed, and the Saudi Arabia national team.

== Club career ==
=== Ohod ===
Hawsawi started his career at the youth teams of Ohod. He made his first team debut for Ohod on 31 March 2021 in a 3–2 win against Al-Nahda. On 28 July 2021, Hawsawi signed his first professional contract with Ohod.

=== Al-Ittihad ===
On 6 July 2022, Hawsawi joined Pro League side Al-Ittihad on a one-year loan with the option to make the move permanent. He made his debut for Al-Ittihad on 15 September 2022 in a 2–0 win against Al-Khaleej. On 30 December 2022, it was announced that Al-Ittihad had exercised the option to buy, thus signing the player on a permanent deal. He scored his first goal in a match against Al-Khaleej on 30 November 2023. During his time at the club, he was part of the squad that won the Saudi Professional League in the 2022–23 season and the Saudi Super Cup in 2022.

=== Al-Raed ===
On 13 August 2024, Hawsawi joined Al-Raed on a three-year contract. He established himself as a regular starter during the 2024–25 season, making 21 league appearances and contributing defensively at left-back

=== Al-Ahli (Loan) ===
On 1 September 2025, Hawsawi joined Al-Ahli on a one-year loan. Hawsawi was part of the Al-Ahli squad that won the 2025-26 AFC Champions League Elite Final, helping the club secure back-to-back continental titles. Known for his aggressive defending, physical duels, and versatility across the back line, Hawsawi contributed important defensive performances throughout the tournament despite receiving a red card in the final against Machida Zelvia.

== International career ==
Hawsawi earned his first call-up for the Saudi Arabia U23 national team during the 2021 Islamic Solidarity Games. He made 4 appearances throughout the competition as the Green Falcons finished in second place, earning a silver medal.

On 31 October 2022, Hawsawi was called up to the senior Saudi Arabia national team. He made his debut on 6 November 2022 in the friendly match against Iceland.

== Career statistics ==
=== Club ===
As of match played 27 May 2025

Club	Season	League			King Cup		Asia		Other		Total	
Club	Season	Division	Apps	Goals	Apps	Goals	Apps	Goals	Apps	Goals	Apps	Goals
Ohod	2020–21	MS League	7	0	—		—		—		7	0
Ohod	2021–22	First Division	29	0	—		—		—		29	0
Ohod	Total		36	0	0	0	0	0	0	0	36	0
Al-Ittihad (loan)	2022–23	Pro League	16	0	3	0	—		2 (Note: Appearance(s) in Saudi Super Cup)	0	21	0
Al-Ittihad	2023–24	Pro League	10	1	2	0	4	0	6 (Note: Four appearance in Arab Club Champions Cup, and two appearances in FIFA Club World Cup)	0	22	1
Al-Ittihad	Total		26	1	5	0	4	0	8	0	43	1
Al-Raed	2024–25	Pro League	21	0	3	0	—		—		24	0
Al-Ahli (loan)	2025–26	Pro League	15	1	0	0	0	0	0	0	0	0
Career total			98	2	8	0	4	0	8	0	118	2

== Honours ==
Al-Ittihad

- Saudi Professional League: 2022–23
- Saudi Super Cup: 2022

Al-Ahli

- AFC Champions League Elite: 2025–26
