= Hamad Al-Jayzani =

Saudi Arabian footballer

Personal information
- Full name: Hamad Sulaiman Al-Jayzani
- Date of birth: March 4, 1993 (age 33)
- Place of birth: Dawadmi, Saudi Arabia
- Height: 1.76 m (5 ft 9 in)
- Position: Full-back

Team information
- Current team: Al-Khaleej
- Number: 28

Senior career*
Years	Team	Apps	(Gls)
2013–2014	Al-Riyadh	?	(?)
2014–2017	Al-Shabab	1	(0)
2015–2016	→ Al-Faisaly (loan)	11	(0)
2017–2018	Al-Qadsiah	5	(0)
2018–2019	Hajer	34	(0)
2019–2020	Damac	12	(0)
2020–2023	Al-Wehda	90	(2)
2023–2025	Al-Raed	49	(0)
2025–	Al-Khaleej	0	(0)

International career
2013–2015	Saudi Arabia U23		
- * Club domestic league appearances and goals as of 18 April 2018

Hamad Al-Jayzani (Arabic: حمد الجيزاني; born 4 March 1993) is a Saudi professional footballer who currently plays as a full back for Al-Khaleej.

== Career ==
On 4 July 2018, Al-Jayzani signed for Hajer.

On 13 July 2023, Al-Jayzani joined Al-Raed on a free transfer.

On 9 July 2025, Al-Jayzani joined Al-Khaleej.
