= Karim El Berkaoui =

Moroccan footballer

Personal information
- Full name: Karim El Berkaoui
- Date of birth: 3 July 1995 (age 31)
- Place of birth: Agadir, Morocco
- Height: 1.75 m (5 ft 9 in)
- Position: Forward

Senior career*
Years	Team	Apps	(Gls)
2014–2020	Hassania Agadir	146	(40)
2020–2025	Al-Raed	124	(60)
2025–2026	Al-Dhafra	18	(10)

International career
2015–2017	Morocco U23	5	(1)
2018–	Morocco A'	2	(1)
Medal record
Representing Morocco
Men's football
FIFA Arab Cup
Winner	2025 Qatar	Team
- * Club domestic league appearances and goals as of 7 May 2025

Karim El Berkaoui (Arabic: كريم البركاوي; born 2 July 1995) is a Moroccan professional footballer who plays as a forward.

El Berkaoui made one unofficial appearance for the Morocco national team in a friendly against the Central African Republic during preparations for 2018 African Nations Championship qualifying.

== Career statistics ==
=== Club ===
As of match played on 8 December 2024

Appearances and goals by club, season and competition
Club	Season	League			National cup (Note: Includes Moroccan Throne Cup, King Cup)		Continental		Total	
Club	Season	Division	Apps	Goals	Apps	Goals	Apps	Goals	Apps	Goals
Hassania Agadir	2013–14	Botola	1	0	0	0	—		1	0
Hassania Agadir	2014–15	Botola	23	2	0	0	—		23	2
Hassania Agadir	2015–16	Botola	27	5	0	0	—		27	5
Hassania Agadir	2016–17	Botola	28	8	0	0	—		28	8
Hassania Agadir	2017–18	Botola	25	6	0	0	—		25	6
Hassania Agadir	2018–19	Botola	17	7	2	0	4 (Note: Appearances in CAF Confederation Cup)	0	23	7
Hassania Agadir	2019–20	Botola	25	12	0	0	11 (Note: Appearances in CAF Confederation Cup)	9	36	21
Hassania Agadir	Total		146	40	2	0	15	9	163	49
Al Raed	2020–21	SPL	25	15	1	0	—		26	15
Al Raed	2021–22	SPL	26	13	1	0	—		27	13
Al Raed	2022–23	SPL	21	9	1	0	—		22	9
Al Raed	2023–24	SPL	30	12	1	1	—		31	13
Al Raed	2024–25	SPL	22	11	3	1	—		25	12
Al Raed	Total		124	60	7	2	—		131	62
Career total			270	100	9	2	15	9	294	111

=== International ===
Goal	Date	Venue	Opponent	Score	Result	Competition
1.	7 December 2021	Al Thumama Stadium, Al Thumama, Qatar	Saudi Arabia	1–0	1–0	2021 FIFA Arab Cup
2.	2 December 2025	Khalifa International Stadium, Al Rayyan, Qatar	Comoros	3–0	3–1	2025 FIFA Arab Cup
3.	8 December 2025	Lusail Stadium, Lusail, Qatar	Saudi Arabia	1–0	1–0	2025 FIFA Arab Cup
4.	15 December 2025	Khalifa International Stadium, Al Rayyan, Qatar	United Arab Emirates	1–0	3–0	2025 FIFA Arab Cup

== Honours ==
Individual

- CAF Confederation Cup Top scorer: 2019–20
