= Moses Turay =

Sierra Leonean footballer (born 2004)

Personal information
- Date of birth: 11 February 2004 (age 22)
- Place of birth: Freetown, Sierra Leone
- Height: 1.80 m (5 ft 11 in)
- Positions: Forward; winger

Youth career
- 2017–2018: Bellamey Academy
- 2018–2020: Allen Stars
- 2020–2022: Montfermeil
- 2022–2023: Troyes

Senior career*
Years	Team	Apps	(Gls)
2023	Pharco	0	(0)
2024	SJK II	7	(0)
2025	Al-Raed	5	(0)
2025	Dubai City	0	(0)

International career
2022–	Sierra Leone	2	(0)
- * Club domestic league appearances and goals as of 19 May 2025

Moses Turay (born 11 February 2004) is a Sierra Leonean professional footballer who plays as a forward for the Sierra Leone national team.

== Club career ==
In June 2022, Turay signed with French club Troyes.

In September 2023, he joined Egyptian Premier League club Pharco.

In August 2024, Turay moved to Finland and signed with SJK Seinäjoki organisation, and was first assigned to the club's reserve team SJK Akatemia in second-tier Ykkösliiga.

On 6 January 2025, Turay signed with Saudi Pro League club Al Raed for an undisclosed fee.

== Career statistics ==
=== Club ===
As of 19 May 2025

Appearances and goals by club, season and competition
Club	Season	League			National cup		Continental		Total	
Club	Season	Division	Apps	Goals	Apps	Goals	Apps	Goals	Apps	Goals
Pharco	2023–24	Egyptian Premier League	0	0	0	0	–		0	0
SJK Akatemia	2024	Ykkösliiga	7	0	0	0	–		7	0
Al Raed	2024–25	Saudi Pro League	5	0	0	0	–		5	0
Dubai City	2025–26	UAE First Division	0	0	0	0	–		0	0
Career total			12	0	0	0	0	0	12	0

=== International ===
As of 19 November 2024

Appearances and goals by national team and year
National team	Year	Apps	Goals
Sierra Leone	2022	1	0
Sierra Leone	2023	0	0
Sierra Leone	2023	1 (Note: Appearance(s) in 2025 Africa Cup of Nations qualification)	0
Total		2	0
