= Omar Shami =

Saudi Arabian footballer

Personal information
- Full name: Omar Ahmed Shami
- Date of birth: 23 March 2004 (age 22)
- Place of birth: Jazan, Saudi Arabia
- Position: Midfielder

Team information
- Current team: Al-Raed
- Number: 15

Youth career
- –2023: Al-Watan
- 2023: Slavia Prague U19
- 2023–2024: Al-Raed

Senior career*
Years	Team	Apps	(Gls)
2024–	Al-Raed	6	(0)
2025	→ Abha (loan)	1	(0)
- * Club domestic league appearances and goals as of 22 July 2025

Omar Shami (Arabic: عمر شامي; born 23 March 2004) is a Saudi Arabian professional footballer who plays as a midfielder for Al-Raed.

== Club career ==
Omar began his career at the youth teams of Al-Watan. He was chosen in the Saudi program to develop football talents established by the General Sports Authority for the 2022–23 season. On 23 March 2023 Omar signed for Czech side Slavia Prague U19.

On 15 September 2023, Shami returned to Saudi and joined Al-Raed. On 27 January 2025, Shami joined Abha on a six month loan. On 5 September 2025, Shami renewed his contract with Al-Raed.
