= Damac Club =

Association football club in Saudi Arabia

Damac Club نادي ضمك
- Full name: Damac Club
- Nicknames: Faris Al-Janub (The Knight of the South); Jabal Damac (Mountain of Damac)
- Founded: 1972; 54 years ago
- Ground: Al-Mahalah Stadium, Damac Club Stadium, Asir Province, Saudi Arabia
- Capacity: 20,000; 5,000
- Owner: Ministry of Sport
- Chairman: Khaled Al Masha'at
- Head coach: Abderrazek Chebbi
- League: Saudi First Division League
- 2025–26: Pro League, 16th of 18 (relegated)
- Website: damac.sa
| Home colours | Away colours | Third colours |

Damac Club is a Saudi Arabian professional football club based in Khamis Mushait, that competes in the Saudi Pro League, the top tier of the Saudi football league system.

Damac hosts its home games at two venues: the Al-Mahalah Stadium in Abha for high-profile matches and the Damac Club Stadium in Khamis Mushait for less prominent fixtures. The club takes its name from the nearby Damac Mountain.

== Honours ==
- Saudi First Division League (tier 2)
  - Runners-up (1): 2018–19
- Saudi Second Division League (tier 3)
  - Winners (2): 1980–81, 2014–15
  - Runners-up (2): 1989–90, 2004–05
- Saudi Third Division League (tier 4)
  - Runners-up (1): 2002–03

== Coaching staff ==
| Position | Name |
|---|---|
| Head coach | (Tunisia) Abderrazek Chebbi |
| Assistant coach | (Saudi Arabia) Hussein Al-Wadaei |
| Goalkeeper coach | (Saudi Arabia) Fayez Al-Asiri |
| Fitness coach | (Tunisia) Noureddine Saleh |
| Rehab coach | (Saudi Arabia) Abdulelah Al-Thani |
| Performance analyst | (Saudi Arabia) Saad Al-Balushi |
| Sporting director | (Saudi Arabia) Ali Al-Shaharili |
| Doctor | (Saudi Arabia) Humaid Al-Khams (Saudi Arabia) Mohamed Al-Sheikh |
| Physiotherapist | (Saudi Arabia) Salman Al-Nawwaf (Saudi Arabia) Faisal Al-Hussaini (Saudi Arabia) Waleed Al-Muqarrib |
| Masseur | (Saudi Arabia) Razzaq Al-Ghanim |
| Nutritionist | (Saudi Arabia) Saleem Al-Alawi |
| Director of development | (Saudi Arabia) Sultan Al-Malik |
| Director of football | (Saudi Arabia) Khalid Al-Thahrani |

=== Managerial history ===
- (Sudan) Azzedine Abbas (1981 – 1985)
- (Tunisia) Mohsen Habacha (1985 – 1986)
- (Tunisia) Djamel Belkacem (2001 – 2004)
- (Tunisia) Mohammed Aldo (2004 – 2006)
- (Morocco) Said El Khider (July 31, 2006 – October 10, 2006)
- (Tunisia) Al Hadi Ben Mokhtar (November 13, 2006 – January 30, 2008)
- (Tunisia) Selim Al Manga (January 31, 2008 – March 29, 2009)
- (Tunisia) Ali Mujahid (July 1, 2009 – January 15, 2010)
- (Tunisia) Mohamed Al Maalej (caretaker) (January 15, 2010 – January 27, 2010)
- (Tunisia) Jalal Kadri (January 27, 2010 – May 1, 2010)
- (Tunisia) Mondher Ladhari (June 15, 2010 – May 31, 2011)
- (Serbia) Boris Bunjak (July 1, 2011 – October 8, 2011)
- (Morocco) Abdelkader Youmir (November 4, 2011 – March 13, 2012)
- (Saudi Arabia) Hassan Ahmed (March 13, 2012 – May 31, 2012)
- (Egypt) Jamal El Din Hamza (July 30, 2012 – November 29, 2012)
- (Tunisia) Selim Al Manga (November 29, 2012 – November 23, 2013)
- (Tunisia) Zouhair Louati (November 23, 2013 – May 1, 2014)
- (Tunisia) Khalil Obaid (June 13, 2014 – December 8, 2014)
- (Tunisia) Mohamed Al Maalej (December 8, 2014 – October 25, 2015)
- (Tunisia) Mohamed Al Dao (October 25, 2015 – March 15, 2016)
- (Tunisia) Selim Al Manga (March 16, 2016 – May 1, 2016)
- (Egypt) Amr Anwar (June 24, 2016 – September 22, 2016)
- (Tunisia) Bayrem Mokhtari (caretaker) (September 22, 2016 – October 4, 2016)
- (Tunisia) Lotfi Kadri (October 5, 2016 – November 19, 2016)
- (Tunisia) Bayrem Mokhtari (November 19, 2016 – February 21, 2017)
- (Croatia) Mladen Frančić (February 21, 2017 – May 22, 2017)
- (Tunisia) Kaies Zouaghi (May 31, 2017 – October 5, 2017)
- (Tunisia) Mahdi Maiz (caretaker) (October 5, 2017 – October 20, 2017)
- (Tunisia) Zouhair Louati (October 20, 2017 – May 1, 2018)
- (Tunisia) Mohamed Kouki (May 31, 2018 – October 5, 2019)
- (Algeria) Noureddine Zekri (October 5, 2019 – January 4, 2021)
- (Croatia) Krešimir Režić (January 4, 2021 – March 6, 2023)
- (Romania) Cosmin Contra (March 6, 2023 – December 6, 2024)
- (Portugal) Nuno Almeida (December 25, 2024 – March 26 2025)
- (Saudi Arabia) Khaled Al-Atwi (March 27, 2025 – June 1, 2025)
- (Portugal) Armando Evangelista (June 24, 2025 – 10 February 2026)
- (Brazil) Fábio Carille (10 February, 2026 –)

== Players ==
Note: Flags indicate national team as defined under FIFA eligibility rules; some limited exceptions apply. Players may hold more than one non-FIFA nationality.

| No. | Pos. | Nation | Player |
|---|---|---|---|
| 2 | MF | GUI | Morlaye Sylla |
| 3 | DF | ALG | Abdelkader Bedrane |
| 4 | DF | KSA | Noor Al-Rashidi |
| 5 | DF | KSA | Hassan Rabei |
| 6 | MF | KSA | Issam Al-Qarni |
| 7 | MF | KSA | Yahya Sunbul |
| 11 | FW | CIV | Yakou Méïté |
| 12 | DF | KSA | Sanousi Hawsawi |
| 14 | MF | KSA | Naif Al-Ghamdi (on loan from Al-Qadsiah) |
| 15 | MF | KSA | Ibrahim Al-Harbi |
| 17 | FW | SYR | Mohammad Alsalkhadi |
| 21 | MF | KSA | Ahmed Omar |

| No. | Pos. | Nation | Player |
|---|---|---|---|
| 22 | GK | KSA | Ahmed Asiri |
| 23 | DF | KSA | Jawad Al-Hassan |
| 24 | DF | KSA | Riyadh Yami |
| 25 | FW | KSA | Mohammed Al-Amri |
| 30 | GK | KSA | Nasser Al-Ghamdi |
| 33 | GK | KSA | Moataz Al-Baqaawi |
| 47 | GK | KSA | Ahmed Al-Rashidi |
| 72 | DF | KSA | Abdullah Al-Yousef |
| 77 | MF | KSA | Ahmed Namazi |
| 78 | DF | KSA | Ali Al-Shaqiqi |
| 80 | FW | KSA | Yahya Al-Najei |
| 88 | MF | KSA | Osama Al-Khalaf |
| 99 | FW | KSA | Freej Al-Jizani (on loan from Al-Ula) |

== See also ==
- List of football clubs in Saudi Arabia
