= Abdullah Al-Yousef (footballer, born 1997) =

Saudi Arabian footballer

Personal information
- Full name: Abdullah Mohammed Al-Yousef
- Date of birth: 29 October 1997 (age 29)
- Place of birth: Al-Hasa, Saudi Arabia
- Height: 1.75 m (5 ft 9 in)
- Position: Left-back

Team information
- Current team: Al-Raed
- Number: 13

Youth career
- Al-Fateh

Senior career*
Years	Team	Apps	(Gls)
2017–2023	Al-Fateh	60	(0)
2023	→ Al-Batin (loan)	16	(0)
2023–	Al-Raed	2	(0)

International career
2018–2021	Saudi Arabia U23		
- * Club domestic league appearances and goals as of 8 September 2023

Abdullah Al-Yousef (Arabic: عبدالله اليوسف; born 29 October 1997) is a Saudi Arabian footballer who plays as a left-back for Saudi Pro League side Al-Raed.

== Career ==
On 8 January 2023, Al-Yousef joined Al-Batin on a six-month loan.

On 8 September 2023, Al-Yousef joined Al-Raed on a permanent deal.

== Career statistics ==
=== Club ===
As of 27 May 2024

Club	Season	League		King Cup		Asia		Other		Total	
Club	Season	Apps	Goals	Apps	Goals	Apps	Goals	Apps	Goals	Apps	Goals
Al-Fateh	2017–18	3	0	0	0	—		0	0	3	0
Al-Fateh	2018–19	12	0	1	0	—		—		13	0
Al-Fateh	2019–20	11	0	2	1	—		—		13	1
Al-Fateh	2020–21	11	0	1	0	—		—		12	0
Al-Fateh	2021–22	18	0	1	0	—		—		19	0
Al-Fateh	2023–24	5	0	0	0	—		—		5	0
Al-Fateh	Total	60	0	5	1	0	0	0	0	65	1
Al-Batin (loan)	2022–23	16	0	0	0	—		—		16	0
Al-Raed	2023–24	12	0	1	0	—		—		13	0
Career totals		88	0	6	1	0	0	0	0	94	1
