= Mohammed Al-Dossari (footballer, born 1999) =

Saudi association football player

Mohammed Al-Dossari محمد الدوسري
Personal information
- Full name: Mohammed Salem Al-Dossari
- Date of birth: 11 July 1999 (age 27)
- Place of birth: Riyadh, Saudi Arabia
- Position: Right back

Team information
- Current team: Al-Raed
- Number: 32

Youth career
- 2012-2019: Al-Hilal

Senior career*
Years	Team	Apps	(Gls)
2019–	Al-Hilal	0	(0)
2019–2020	→ Al-Raed (loan)	25	(0)
2020–	Al-Raed	82	(1)
- * Club domestic league appearances and goals as of 23 December 2023

Mohammed Al-Dossari (Arabic: محمد الدوسري; born 11 July 1999) is a Saudi Arabian professional footballer who plays as a right back for Al-Raed.

== Career ==
Al-Dossari began his career at the youth team of Al-Hilal. He signed a one-year contract with the option to extend for a further on 3 August 2019. On 21 August 2019, Al-Dossari joined Saudi Professional League side Al-Raed on loan from Al-Hilal for the 2019–20 season.
