= Yahya Sunbul =

Saudi Arabian footballer

Personal information
- Full name: Yahya Sunbul Hadi Mubarak
- Date of birth: January 7, 1998 (age 28)
- Place of birth: Saudi Arabia
- Height: 1.66 m (5 ft 5 in)
- Position: Midfielder

Team information
- Current team: Al-Raed
- Number: 45

Youth career
- –2015: Al-Amjad
- 2015–2017: Al-Ittihad

Senior career*
Years	Team	Apps	(Gls)
2017–2018	Al-Ittihad	0	(0)
2019	Al-Nojoom	0	(0)
2019–2020	Hetten	23	(2)
2020–2021	Jeddah	27	(2)
2021–	Al-Raed	54	(3)
- * Club domestic league appearances and goals as of 7 December 2024

Yahya Sunbul (Arabic: يحيى سنبل; born 7 January 1998) is a Saudi Arabian professional footballer who plays as a midfielder for Pro League side Al-Raed.

== Club career ==
Sunbul began his career at the youth team of Al-Amjad. He joined the youth team of Al-Ittihad On 2 September 2015. and was called up to the first team in 2018. He left the club in the same year he was called up after failing to make an appearance for the senior team. At the beginning of 2019, he joined Al-Nojoom until the end of the season. On 24 July 2019, Sunbul joined Hetten on a one-year contract. He made 23 appearances and scored twice before leaving following Hetten's relegation to the Saudi Second Division. On 13 October 2020, Sunbul joined Jeddah. On 26 August 2021, Sunbul joined Pro League side Al-Raed.
