= Khalid Al-Subaie =

Saudi Arabian footballer

Personal information
- Full name: Khalid Mohammed Al-Subaie
- Date of birth: 26 October 1999 (age 27)
- Place of birth: Saudi Arabia
- Height: 1.76 m (5 ft 9 1/2 in)
- Positions: Left-back; midfielder

Team information
- Current team: Al-Najma (on loan from Al-Hazem)
- Number: 27

Youth career
- Al-Hilal

Senior career*
Years	Team	Apps	(Gls)
2019	Najran	0	(0)
2019–2021	Al-Shoulla	12	(2)
2021–2022	Al-Jeel	35	(1)
2022–2023	Al-Qaisumah	33	(4)
2023–2025	Al-Raed	48	(1)
2025–	Al-Hazem	2	(0)
2026–	→ Al-Najma (loan)	1	(0)
- * Club domestic league appearances and goals as of 27 May 2024

Khalid Al-Subaie (Arabic: خالد السبيعي, born 26 October 1999) is a Saudi Arabian professional footballer who plays as a left-back for Pro League side Al-Najma, on loan from Al-Hazem.

== Career ==
Al-Subaie began his career at the youth team of Al-Hilal. On 19 July 2019, Al-Subaie joined First Division side Najran. On 3 September 2019, Al-Subaie was released from his contract by Najran and joined Al-Shoulla. In August 2021, Al-Subaie joined Al-Jeel. On 21 July 2022, Al-Subaie joined Al-Qaisumah on a one-year deal following Al-Jeel's relegation to the Second Division. On 10 July 2023, Al-Subaie joined Pro League side Al-Raed on a two-year deal. On 14 August 2023, Al-Subaie made his Pro League debut for Al-Raed in the 3–0 home defeat to Al-Ittihad. On 29 December 2023, Al-Subaie scored his first goal for Al-Raed in the 4–3 win against Abha. On 10 September 2025, Al-Subaie joined Al-Hazem. On 26 January 2026, Al-Subaie joined Al-Najma on a six-month loan.
