= Oumar Gonzalez =

Cameroonian footballer (born 1998)

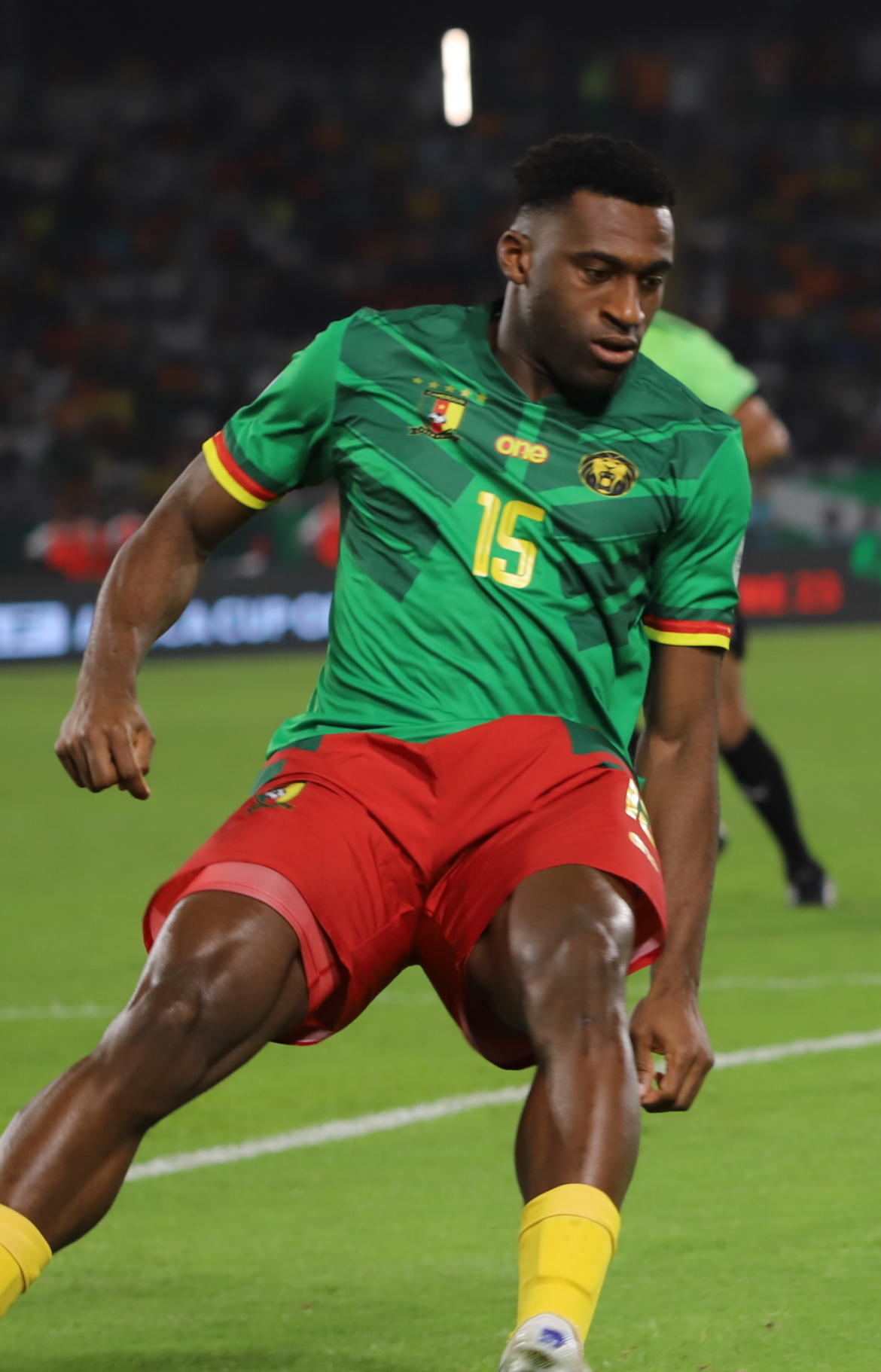
- Gonzalez with Cameroon in 2024

Personal information
- Date of birth: 25 February 1998 (age 28)
- Place of birth: Douala, Cameroon
- Height: 1.86 m (6 ft 1 in)
- Position: Defender

Team information
- Current team: Al-Raed
- Number: 21

Youth career
- 2005–2008: US Baille
- 2008–2013: Air Bel
- 2013–2015: Metz

Senior career*
Years	Team	Apps	(Gls)
2015–2019	Metz B	11	(1)
2016–2017	→ Épinal (loan)	24	(2)
2017–2018	→ Rodez (loan)	12	(1)
2018–2019	→ Villefranche (loan)	30	(1)
2019–2021	Chambly	40	(2)
2019–2021	Chambly B	1	(0)
2021–2023	Ajaccio	64	(3)
2023–	Al-Raed	56	(6)

International career^{‡}
2019	Cameroon U23	3	(0)
2023–	Cameroon	9	(0)
- * Club domestic league appearances and goals as of 15 May 2025 ‡ National team caps and goals as of 27 January 2024

Oumar Gonzalez (born 25 February 1998) is a Cameroonian professional footballer who plays as a defender for Saudi Pro League club Al-Raed and the Cameroon national team.

== Club career ==
On 10 August 2015, Gonzalez signed his first professional contract with Metz. After several seasons out on loan at different clubs, he signed with Chambly on 7 June 2019. Gonzalez made his professional debut with the club in a 1–0 Ligue 2 win over Valenciennes on 26 July 2019.

On 17 August 2023, Gonzalez joined Saudi Pro League club Al-Raed.

== International career ==
Gonzalez represented the Cameroon U23s at the 2019 Africa U-23 Cup of Nations.

He made his senior international debut for Cameroon on 10 June 2023, in a friendly match against Mexico, playing the full 90 minutes.

On 28 December 2023, he was selected from the list of 27 Cameroonian players selected by Rigobert Song to compete in the 2023 Africa Cup of Nations.

== Personal life ==
Born in Cameroon, Gonzalez took his adoptive Mexican father's Spanish surname. He holds Cameroonian, French and Mexican nationalities.

== Career statistics ==
=== Club ===
As of match played on 26 May 2025

Appearances and goals by club, season and competition
Club	Season	League			Cup		League Cup		Continental		Other		Total	
Club	Season	Division	Apps	Goals	Apps	Goals	Apps	Goals	Apps	Goals	Apps	Goals	Apps	Goals
Metz B	2015–16	CFA 2	11	1	—		—		—		—		11	1
Épinal (loan)	2016–17	National	24	2	3	0	—		—		—		27	2
Rodez (loan)	2017–18	National	12	1	0	0	—		—		—		12	1
Villefranche (loan)	2018–19	National	30	1	5	1	—		—		—		35	2
Chambly	2019–20	Ligue 2	21	1	1	0	0	0	—		—		22	1
Chambly	2020–21	Ligue 2	19	1	0	0	—		—		—		19	1
Chambly	Total		40	2	1	0	0	0	—		—		41	2
Chambly B	2019–20	National 3	1	0	—		—		—		—		1	0
Ajaccio	2021–22	Ligue 2	34	3	0	0	—		—		—		34	3
Ajaccio	2022–23	Ligue 1	30	0	2	0	—		—		—		32	0
Ajaccio	Total		64	3	2	0	—		—		—		66	3
Al-Raed	2023–24	Saudi Pro League	31	3	1	0	—		—		—		32	3
Al-Raed	2024–25	Saudi Pro League	27	3	3	0	—		—		—		30	3
Al-Raed	Total		58	6	4	0	—		—		—		62	6
Career total			240	16	15	1	0	0	0	0	0	0	255	17
