= 2019–20 Al-Fateh SC season =

Al-Fateh
2019–20 season
- Chairman: Saad Al-Afaliq
- Manager: Fathi Al-Jabal (until 14 October); Yannick Ferrera (from 14 October)
- Stadium: Prince Abdullah bin Jalawi Stadium
- Pro League: 13th
- King Cup: Quarter-finals
- Top goalscorer: League: Mitchell te Vrede (12); All: Mitchell te Vrede (14)
- Highest home attendance: 14,000 (vs. Al-Ahli, 21 September 2019)
- Lowest home attendance: 2,007 (vs. Al-Hazem, 20 December 2019)
- Average home league attendance: 10,269
Home colours	Away colours
- All statistics correct as of 9 September 2020.

The 2019–20 season was Al-Fateh's 11th consecutive season in the Pro League and their 62nd year in existence. The club participated in the Pro League and the King Cup.

The season covered the period from 1 July 2019 to 9 September 2020.

== Players ==
=== Squad information ===
As of 1 February 2020

Note: Flags indicate national team as defined under FIFA eligibility rules; some limited exceptions apply. Players may hold more than one non-FIFA nationality.

No.	Pos.	Nation	Player
1	GK	KSA	Basil Al-Bahrani
2	DF	KSA	Nawaf Boushal
3	DF	KSA	Mohammad Naji
5	MF	MAR	Marwane Saâdane
6	MF	KSA	Ali Al-Hassan
7	FW	KSA	Saqer Otaif
8	MF	SDN	Mohammed Al-Dhaw
9	FW	NED	Mitchell te Vrede
12	MF	KSA	Majed Kanabah
14	MF	KSA	Mohammed Al-Fuhaid (captain)
16	MF	KSA	Munther Al-Nakhli
17	DF	URU	Matías Aguirregaray
18	MF	KSA	Mohammed Al-Saeed

No.	Pos.	Nation	Player
19	FW	KSA	Mohammed Majrashi
21	FW	DEN	Bashkim Kadrii
23	DF	KSA	Abdullah Al-Yousef
25	DF	KSA	Tawfiq Buhimed (vice-captain)
26	MF	KSA	Ali Al-Zaqaan
27	MF	KSA	Saeed Al-Dossari
28	MF	ALG	Sofiane Bendebka
30	GK	KSA	Habib Al-Wotayan
34	GK	KSA	Mohammed Al-Burayh
35	GK	UKR	Maksym Koval
78	DF	KSA	Ali Lajami
87	DF	KSA	Qassem Lajami
88	MF	NOR	Gustav Wikheim

=== Out on loan ===
Note: Flags indicate national team as defined under FIFA eligibility rules; some limited exceptions apply. Players may hold more than one non-FIFA nationality.

No.	Pos.	Nation	Player
11	MF	SRB	Saša Jovanović (at Deportivo La Coruña until 30 June 2020)

== Transfers and loans ==
=== Transfers in ===
Entry date	Position	No.	Player	From club	Fee	Ref.
28 May 2019	MF	5	(Morocco) Marwane Saâdane	(Turkey) Çaykur Rizespor	Free	
29 May 2019	MF	12	(Saudi Arabia) Majed Kanabah	(Saudi Arabia) Al-Fateh	Free	
1 June 2019	DF	87	(Saudi Arabia) Qassem Lajami	(Saudi Arabia) Al-Fateh	Free	
2 June 2019	MF	22	(Poland) Michał Janota	(Poland) Arka Gdynia	$436,000	
23 June 2019	FW	9	(Netherlands) Mitchell te Vrede	(Netherlands) NAC Breda	Free	
24 June 2019	DF	3	(Saudi Arabia) Mohammad Naji	(Saudi Arabia) Al-Jeel	Free	
24 June 2019	FW	7	(Saudi Arabia) Saqer Otaif	(Saudi Arabia) Ohod	Free	
25 June 2019	FW	19	(Saudi Arabia) Mohammed Majrashi	(Saudi Arabia) Al-Faisaly	Free	
28 June 2019	MF	8	(Sudan) Mohammed Al-Dhaw	(Saudi Arabia) Ohod	Free	
28 June 2019	GK	34	(Saudi Arabia) Mohammed Al-Burayh	(Saudi Arabia) Al-Qaisumah	Free	
1 July 2019	DF	25	(Saudi Arabia) Tawfiq Buhimed	(Saudi Arabia) Al-Fayha	Free	
1 July 2019	GK	35	(Ukraine) Maksym Koval	(Ukraine) Dynamo Kyiv	Undisclosed	
4 July 2019	MF	27	(Saudi Arabia) Saeed Al-Dossari	(Saudi Arabia) Al-Hazem	Free	
13 July 2019	DF	17	(Uruguay) Matías Aguirregaray	(Mexico) Tijuana	Undisclosed	
30 August 2019	DF	4	(Portugal) André Pinto	(Portugal) Sporting CP	Free	
1 September 2019	MF	88	(Norway) Gustav Wikheim	(Denmark) Midtjylland	$1,460,000	
27 January 2020	MF	21	(Denmark) Bashkim Kadrii	(Denmark) Odense Boldklub	$1,460,000	
29 January 2020	MF	28	(Algeria) Sofiane Bendebka	(Algeria) MC Alger	Undisclosed	

=== Transfers out ===
Exit date	Position	No.	Player	To club	Fee	Ref.
24 June 2019	MF	7	(Saudi Arabia) Ahmed Al-Nadhri	(Saudi Arabia) Al-Adalah	Free	
2 July 2019	GK	12	(Saudi Arabia) Ali Al-Mazidi	(Saudi Arabia) Al-Adalah	Free	
3 July 2019	FW	11	(Saudi Arabia) Hamad Al-Juhaim	(Saudi Arabia) Al-Fayha	Free	
9 July 2019	FW	90	(Brazil) João Pedro	(United Arab Emirates) Al-Dhafra	Undisclosed	
17 July 2019	MF	15	(Saudi Arabia) Mansor Hamzi	(Saudi Arabia) Al-Hazem	Undisclosed	
26 July 2019	FW	–	(Saudi Arabia) Abdullah Al-Bladi	(Saudi Arabia) Al-Thoqbah	Free	
28 July 2019	MF	–	(Saudi Arabia) Hussain Al-Qahtani	(Saudi Arabia) Al-Mujazzal	Free	
29 July 2019	MF	77	(Saudi Arabia) Ibrahim Al-Telhi	(Saudi Arabia) Al-Jabalain	Free	
2 August 2019	DF	33	(Saudi Arabia) Yassin Hamzah	(Saudi Arabia) Al-Wehda	Free	
27 August 2019	DF	3	(Saudi Arabia) Jamaan Al-Dossari	(Saudi Arabia) Damac	Free	
29 August 2019	DF	4	(Algeria) Mohamed Naâmani		Released	
30 August 2019	MF	29	(Saudi Arabia) Mohammad Al-Majhad	(Saudi Arabia) Al-Ahli	$3,500,000	
2 September 2019	MF	49	(Saudi Arabia) Salem Al Najrani	(Saudi Arabia) Najran	Free	
30 December 2019	DF	5	(Saudi Arabia) Amjad Al-Mayhan	(Saudi Arabia) Al-Rawdhah	Free	
8 January 2020	MF	24	(Algeria) Ibrahim Chenihi	(Saudi Arabia) Damac	Free	
25 January 2020	MF	10	(Tunisia) Abdelkader Oueslati	(Tunisia) Club Africain	Free	
2 February 2020	DF	66	(Saudi Arabia) Sultan Al-Deayea	(Saudi Arabia) Al-Shoulla	Free	

=== Loans out ===
Start date	End date	Position	No.	Player	To club	Fee	Ref.
4 August 2019	End of season	MF	–	(Zambia) Saith Sakala	(Saudi Arabia) Al-Ansar	None	
2 September 2019	End of season	MF	–	(Serbia) Saša Jovanović	(Spain) Deportivo La Coruña	None	

== Pre-season and friendlies ==
Win Draw Loss

August 2019 Friendly	v	(Saudi Arabia) Al-Fateh

== Competitions ==
=== Overview ===
Competition	First match	Last match	Starting round	Final position	Record							
Competition	First match	Last match	Starting round	Final position	Pld	W	D	L	GF	GA	GD	Win %
Professional League	24 August 2019	9 September 2020	Matchday 1	13th	30	8	9	13	42	49	−7	26.67
King Cup	6 November 2019	18 January 2020	Round of 64	Quarter-finals	4	3	1	0	10	3	+7	75.00
Total					34	11	10	13	52	52	+0	32.35

Last updated: 9 September 2020
Source: Soccerway

=== Saudi Professional League ===
==== League table ====
Pos	Team	Pld	W	D	L	GF	GA	GD	Pts	Qualification or relegation
11	Al-Ittihad	30	9	8	13	42	41	+1	35 (Note: Positions determined by head-to-head points: Damac: 9 pts; Al-Ittihad: 6 pts; Al-Taawoun: 3 pts.)	
12	Al-Taawoun	30	10	5	15	33	40	−7	35	
13	Al-Fateh	30	8	9	13	42	49	−7	33	
14	Al-Fayha (R)	30	8	8	14	34	44	−10	32	Relegation to Prince Mohammad bin Salman League
15	Al-Hazem (R)	30	7	6	17	40	61	−21	27	Relegation to Prince Mohammad bin Salman League

Updated to match(es) played on 9 September 2020. Source: spl.com
Rules for classification: 1) Points; 2) Head-to-head points; 3) Head-to-head goal difference; 4) Total goal difference; 5) Total goals scored; 6) Fair-play points (Note: Head-to-head record is used only after all the matches between the teams in question have been played).
(R) Relegated

==== Results summary ====
Overall								Home						Away					
Pld	W	D	L	GF	GA	GD	Pts	W	D	L	GF	GA	GD	W	D	L	GF	GA	GD
30	8	9	13	42	49	−7	33	5	6	4	20	19	+1	3	3	9	22	30	−8

Last updated: 9 September 2020.
Source: Saudi Pro League

==== Result round by round ====
Round	1	2	3	4	5	6	7	8	9	10	11	12	13	14	15	16	17	18	19	20	21	22	23	24	25	26	27	28	29	30
Ground	H	H	A	H	A	H	A	A	H	A	A	H	A	A	H	A	A	H	A	H	A	H	H	A	H	H	A	H	H	A
Result	L	L	L	L	L	D	W	L	D	L	L	W	D	L	D	L	D	D	W	W	D	L	W	L	W	D	W	D	W	L
Position	12	13	16	16	16	16	15	15	15	15	16	15	14	14	14	15	15	16	14	14	14	14	14	14	13	14	12	11	10	13

Updated to match(es) played on 9 September 2020. Source: Saudi Pro League
A = Away; H = Home; W = Win; D = Draw; L = Loss

==== Matches ====
The Professional League schedule was announced on 21 July 2019.

All times are local, AST (UTC+3).

24 August 2019 1	Al-Fateh	1–2	Al-Shabab	Al-Hasa
18:50	Al-Zaqaan (yellow card) 45+4'; Buhimed (yellow card) 48'; Saâdane 90+1' (pen.)	Report	Asprilla 1'; Guanca 49' (pen.)	Stadium: Prince Abdullah bin Jalawi Stadium; Attendance: 5,242; Referee: Martin van den Kerkhof (Netherlands)

30 August 2019 2	Al-Fateh	0–1	Al-Nassr	Al-Hasa
20:40	Naji (yellow card) 14'; Sayed Al-Dhaw (yellow card) 24'; Al-Zaqaan (yellow card) 58'; Buhimed (yellow card) 62'; Otaif (yellow card) 90+5'	Report	Al-Buraikan 49'; Al Mansor (yellow card) 88'	Stadium: Prince Abdullah bin Jalawi Stadium; Attendance: 12,663; Referee: Ovidiu Hațegan (Romania)

15 September 2019 3	Al-Faisaly	3–2	Al-Fateh	Al Majma'ah
20:10	Luisinho (yellow card) 20'; El Jebli 52'; Bonevacia 62', 68'	Report	Al-Zaqaan 21'; Buhimed (yellow card) 54' (yellow-red card) 90+3'; Majrashi 63'	Stadium: Al Majma'ah Sports City; Attendance: 4,450; Referee: Daniel Stefanski (Poland)

21 September 2019 4	Al-Fateh	0–2	Al-Ahli	Al-Hasa
18:20	Al-Fuhaid (yellow card) 47'	Report	Djaniny 6'; Al Somah 22'; Al-Mousa (yellow card) 51'; Hassoun (yellow card) 55'; A. Asiri (yellow card) 63'	Stadium: Prince Abdullah bin Jalawi Stadium; Attendance: 14,000; Referee: Serdar Gözübüyük (Netherlands)

27 September 2019 5	Al-Wehda	2–0	Al-Fateh	Mecca
20:15	Niakaté 15' (pen.); Anselmo (yellow card) 90+2', (goal) 90+4'	Report	Koval (yellow card) 16'; Al-Dhaw (yellow card) 81'; Lajami (yellow card) 86'	Stadium: King Abdul Aziz Stadium; Attendance: 3,269; Referee: Siemen Mulder (Netherlands)

4 October 2019 6	Al-Fateh	2–2	Al-Raed	Al-Hasa
18:05	Al-Saâdane (yellow card) 21' te Vrede 34'; Al-Zaqaan 41', (yellow card) 78'; Koval (yellow card) 90'	Report	Pérez 29'; Djoum (yellow card) 43'; Fouzair 90+1'	Stadium: Prince Abdullah bin Jalawi Stadium; Attendance: 7,123; Referee: Jorge Sousa (Portugal)

18 October 2019 7	Al-Adalah	3–5	Al-Fateh	Al-Hasa
17:50	Al-Humayan (red card) 28'; Al-Burayh (yellow card) 45+5'; Al-Eisa 83'; Andriamatsinoro 87', 90+5'	Report	Janota 4'; Lajami (yellow card) 36'; Wikheim 41' te Vrede 43', 85'; Saâdane 45+6' (pen.); Buhimed (yellow card) 60'	Stadium: Prince Abdullah bin Jalawi Stadium; Attendance: 5,915; Referee: Bakary Gassama (Gambia)

25 October 2019 8	Al-Fayha	3–1	Al-Fateh	Al Majma'ah
18:00	Nasser (yellow card) 20'; Owusu 48', (yellow card) 84'; Al-Khaibari 51'; Fernández 75', (yellow card) 76'	Report	Saâdane 20' (pen.)	Stadium: Al Majma'ah Sports City; Attendance: 3,802; Referee: António Nobre (Portugal)

31 October 2019 9	Al-Fateh	3–3	Al-Hilal	Al-Hasa
19:50	Saâdane 8' (pen.), (yellow card) 20' te Vrede 77', 88'; Aguirregaray (yellow card) 81'; Majrashi (yellow card) 90+1'	Report	Al-Shahrani (yellow card) 7'; Al-Shehri 22'; Carlos Eduardo 34'; Al-Faraj (yellow card) 84'; Gomis 90+5'	Stadium: Prince Abdullah bin Jalawi Stadium; Attendance: 13,806; Referee: Ivan Bebek (Croatia)

22 November 2019 10	Abha	3–1	Al-Fateh	Abha
15:30 AST (UTC+3)	Bguir 9'; Al-Nabit 18'; Barnawi (yellow card) 20'; Al-Najar (yellow card) 77'; Al Abbas 86'	Report	Al-Fuhaid (yellow card) 4'; Aguirregaray (red card) 33'; Buhimed 49'; Majrashi (yellow card) 72'; Boushal (yellow card) 78'	Stadium: Prince Sultan bin Abdul Aziz Stadium; Attendance: 855; Referee: Fedayi San (Switzerland)

13 December 2019 11	Al-Ettifaq	1–0	Al-Fateh	Dammam
17:30	Al-Qumaizi (yellow card) 27'; Mahnashi (yellow card) 41'; Rogerinho 87'	Report	Al Hassan (yellow card) 86'; Al-Fuhaid (yellow card) 89'	Stadium: Prince Mohamed bin Fahd Stadium; Attendance: 2,860; Referee: Robert Madden (Scotland)

20 December 2019 12	Al-Fateh	2–1	Al-Hazem	Al-Hasa
17:35	Saâdane 11' (pen.); Majrashi (yellow card) 13' te Vrede 86'; Pinto (yellow card) 90+3'	Report	Strandberg 2'; Fettouhi (yellow card) 36'; Muralha (yellow card) 67'	Stadium: Prince Abdullah bin Jalawi Stadium; Attendance: 2,007; Referee: Viktor Kassai (Hungary)

28 December 2019 13	Al-Ittihad	1–1	Al-Fateh	Mecca
19:50	Al-Shamrani (yellow card) 23'; Al-Muwallad (yellow card) 39'; Romarinho (yellow card) 39'; Al-Ghamdi 90+4'; Al-Malki (yellow card) 90+6'	Report	Wikheim (yellow card) 49'; Majrashi 74', (yellow card) 82'; Koval (yellow card) 89'	Stadium: King Abdul Aziz Stadium; Attendance: 5,112; Referee: István Kovács (Romania)

10 January 2020 14	Al-Taawoun	2–1	Al-Fateh	Buraidah
18:05	Amissi 21', 90+4'	Report	Al-Zaqaan 37'	Stadium: King Abdullah Sport City Stadium; Attendance: 1,678; Referee: Khaled Al-Turais

23 January 2020 15	Al-Fateh	0–0	Damac	Al-Hasa
17:55	Majrashi (yellow card) 56'; Boushal (yellow card) 81'	Report	Ammari (red card) 72'	Stadium: Prince Abdullah bin Jalawi Stadium; Attendance: 12,290; Referee: Paweł Gil (Poland)

1 February 2020 16	Al-Shabab	2–1	Al-Fateh	Riyadh
18:15	Diop 48'; Guanca 51'; Sebá (yellow card) 88'	Report	Saâdane 35'; Kanabah (yellow card) 39'; Naji (yellow card) 54'; Majrashi (yellow card) 76'	Stadium: Prince Faisal bin Fahd Stadium; Attendance: 8,911; Referee: Turki Al-Khudhayr

6 February 2020 17	Al-Nassr	1–1	Al-Fateh	Riyadh
18:20	Hamdallah 62' (pen.)	Report	Wikheim (yellow card) 37'; Saâdane (yellow card) 61'; Al-Hassan 70'	Stadium: Prince Faisal bin Fahd Stadium; Attendance: 10,922; Referee: Ivan Bebek (Croatia)

15 February 2020 18	Al-Fateh	2–2	Al-Faisaly	Al-Hasa
18:10	Wikheim 24'; Al-Fuhaid (yellow card) 27'; Koval (yellow card) 65'; Bendebka 85', (yellow card) 86'; Saâdane (yellow card) 87'; Lajami (yellow card) 90+4'; Buhimed (yellow card) 90+7'	Report	Al-Qahtani (yellow card) 53'; Al-Saiari (yellow card) 55' (yellow-red card) 90+7'; El Jebli 66'; Malayekah 90+5'; Al-Kassar (yellow card) 90+6'	Stadium: Prince Abdullah bin Jalawi Stadium; Attendance: 13,091; Referee: Sultan Al-Harbi

21 February 2020 19	Al-Ahli	0–1	Al-Fateh	Jeddah
20:30	Asiri (yellow card) 35'; Abdulghani (yellow card) 81'; Al-Moasher (yellow card) 84'	Report	Bendebka 45+1'; Al-Zaqaan (yellow card) 89'	Stadium: King Abdullah Sports City; Attendance: 8,930; Referee: Majed Al-Shamrani

29 February 2020 20	Al-Fateh	3–2	Al-Wehda	Al-Hasa
15:40	Bendebka 42', (yellow card) 90+3' te Vrede 45+4'; Aguirregaray 66'	Report	Niakaté 25'; Luisinho 34'; Al-Qarni (yellow card) 45+3'; Botía (yellow card) 63'; Al-Shamlan (yellow card) 70'	Stadium: Prince Abdullah bin Jalawi Stadium; Attendance: 12,198; Referee: Khaled Al-Teris

6 March 2020 21	Al-Raed	0–0	Al-Fateh	Buraidah
16:05		Report	Saâdane (yellow card) 53'; Kanabah (yellow card) 78'; Al-Yousef (yellow card) 90+5'	Stadium: King Abdullah Sports City Stadium; Attendance: 1,885; Referee: Matej Jug (Slovenia)

12 March 2020 22	Al-Fateh	0–1	Al-Adalah	Al-Hasa
20:40	Wikheim (yellow card) 85'	Report	Al-Yousef 5' (pen.); Al-Mazidi (yellow card) 40'; Traoré (yellow card) 86'; Al-Burayh (yellow card) 90+2'	Stadium: Prince Abdullah bin Jalawi Stadium; Attendance: 0 (Note: Matches from 7 March and onwards will be played behind closed doors due to concerns over the coronavirus outbreak.); Referee: Aleksei Kulbakov (Belarus)

4 August 2020 23	Al-Fateh	2–0	Al-Fayha	Al-Hasa
19:00	Buhimed (yellow card) 1'; Saâdane 16' (pen.); Al-Fuhaid (yellow card) 45'; Bendebka 75'; Kanabah (yellow card) 90+3'	Report	Al-Barakah (yellow card) 13'; Neto (yellow card) 44'; Ba Masoud (yellow card) 83'	Stadium: Prince Abdullah bin Jalawi Stadium; Attendance: 0 Referee: Turki Al-Khudhayr

10 August 2020 24	Al-Hilal	2–1	Al-Fateh	Riyadh
21:00	Gomis 38' (pen.), 87' (pen.); Al-Shahrani (yellow card) 79'; Hyun-soo (yellow card) 81'; Al-Shehri (yellow card) 90+4'	Report	Al-Hassan (yellow card) 38'; Gomis 53' (o.g.); Lajami (yellow card) 69'; Al-Zaqaan (yellow card) 74'; Al-Dossari (yellow card) 89'	Stadium: King Saud University Stadium; Attendance: 0 Referee: Georgi Kabakov (Bulgaria)

14 August 2020 25	Al-Fateh	2–1	Abha	Al-Hasa
18:55	Kadrii 20'; Naji 37'; Al-Hassan (yellow card) 42'; Boushal (yellow card) 51'; Bendebka (yellow card) 60'; Saâdane (red card) 70'	Report	Al-Qeed 23'; Al-Muziel (yellow card) 36'; Al-Sharari (yellow card) 45+2'; Al Abbas (yellow card) 84'	Stadium: Prince Abdullah bin Jalawi Stadium; Attendance: 0 Referee: Kristo Tohver (Estonia)

19 August 2020 26	Al-Fateh	1–1	Al-Ettifaq	Al-Hasa
18:50	Naji (yellow card) 3'; Al-Fuhaid (yellow card) 13' (yellow-red card) 27'; Aguirregaray 20', (yellow card) 36'; Al-Yousef (yellow card) 67'	Report	Doukara 8'; Mahnashi (yellow card) 52'; Hazazi (yellow card) 90'	Stadium: Prince Abdullah bin Jalawi Stadium; Attendance: 0 Referee: Faisal Al-Blwi

24 August 2020 27	Al-Hazem	3–4	Al-Fateh	Ar Rass
19:10	Strandberg 40' (pen.); Al-Khalaf 59' (pen.); Al-Yami 90+1'	Report	Bendebka 18'; Saâdane (yellow card) 39' te Vrede 49', (yellow card) 70'; Kadrii 51'; Al-Hassan 80'; Al-Zaqaan (yellow card) 90+3'	Stadium: Al-Hazem Club Stadium; Attendance: 0 Referee: Aleksei Kulbakov (Belarus)

30 August 2020 28	Al-Fateh	1–1	Al-Ittihad	Al-Hasa
18:40	te Vrede 42'; Al-Yousef (yellow card) 45+2'; Naji (yellow card) 55'	Report	Al-Bishi (yellow card) 19' (yellow-red card) 39'; Romarinho 47'	Stadium: Prince Abdullah bin Jalawi Stadium; Attendance: 0 Referee: Néstor Pitana (Argentina)

4 September 2020 29	Al-Fateh	1–0	Al-Taawoun	Al-Hasa
20:35	Saâdane (yellow card) 50'; Bendebka (yellow card) 65' te Vrede 81'; Majrashi (yellow card) 88'; Al-Zaqaan (yellow card) 90+5'	Report	Mendash (yellow card) 28'; Petrolina (yellow card) 57'; Sandro (yellow card) 70'	Stadium: Prince Abdullah bin Jalawi Stadium; Attendance: 0 Referee: Gediminas Mažeika (Lithuania)

9 September 2020 30	Damac	4–3	Al-Fateh	Abha
20:35	Vittor (yellow card) 6'; Zelaya 9' (pen.), 71' (pen.); Chenihi 44'; Harzan (yellow card) 45+3'; Al-Najei (yellow card) 50'; Al-Jouei 87'; Zeghba (yellow card) 90+5'	Report	Kanabah (yellow card) 23'; Naji 45+2' te Vrede 58' (pen.), 84' (pen.); Al-Saeed (yellow card) 70'	Stadium: Prince Sultan bin Abdul Aziz Stadium; Attendance: 0 Referee: Faisal Al-Blwi

=== King Cup ===
All times are local, AST (UTC+3).

6 November 2019 Round of 64	Al-Entesar	0–4	Al-Fateh	Jeddah
15:50	Mashlwi (yellow card) 28'	Report	Aguirregaray 33', 45+3'; Al-Saeed 60' (pen.); Al-Yousef 62'	Stadium: Al-Ittihad Club Stadium; Referee: Abdullah Zarban

4 December 2019 Round of 32	Najran	1–3	Al-Fateh	Najran
15:25	Al-Shanqeeti 27'; Al-Dossari (yellow card) 66'; Al-Johani (yellow card) 90+3'	Report	Al-Hassan (yellow card) 4' te Vrede 10'; Koval (yellow card) 21'; Al-Zaqaan 31', (yellow card) 90+6'; Al-Saeed 54'; Saâdane (yellow card) 66'	Stadium: Najran University Stadium; Referee: Mamdouh Al Shahdan

1 January 2020 Round of 16	Al-Ittihad	1–2	Al-Fateh	Mecca
18:30	El Ahmadi 13'; Abdulwahed (yellow card) 48'; Al-Daheem (yellow card) 63'	Report	te Vrede 15'; Al-Shamrani 89' (o.g.)	Stadium: King Abdul Aziz Stadium; Referee: Ovidiu Hațegan (Romania)

18 January 2020 Quarter-finals	Abha	1–1 (a.e.t.) (5–3 p)	Al-Fateh	Abha
15:55	Barnawi (yellow card) 21'; Bguir 28' (pen.); Fallatah (yellow card) 90+2'	Report	Al-Saeed (yellow card) 25'; Saâdane 50'	Stadium: Prince Sultan bin Abdul Aziz Stadium; Referee: Andris Treimanis (Latvia)
	Penalties
	Andriatsima (penalty scored); Al-Najar (penalty scored); Aouadhi (penalty scored); Bguir (penalty scored); Qaisi (penalty scored)		(penalty scored) Saâdane; (penalty scored) Janota; (penalty missed) Al-Nakhli; (penalty scored) Boushal

== Statistics ==
=== Appearances ===
Last updated on 9 September 2020.

No.	Pos	Nat	Player	Total		Pro League		King Cup	
No.	Pos	Nat	Player	Apps	Goals	Apps	Goals	Apps	Goals
Goalkeepers
1	GK	(Saudi Arabia) KSA	Basil Al-Bahrani	0	0	0	0	0	0
30	GK	(Saudi Arabia) KSA	Habib Al-Wotayan	12	0	12	0	0	0
34	GK	(Saudi Arabia) KSA	Mohammed Al-Burayh	0	0	0	0	0	0
35	GK	(Ukraine) UKR	Maksym Koval	22	0	18	0	4	0
Defenders
2	DF	(Saudi Arabia) KSA	Nawaf Boushal	20	0	13+4	0	3	0
3	DF	(Saudi Arabia) KSA	Mohammad Naji	21	2	14+6	2	0+1	0
15	DF	(Saudi Arabia) KSA	Ziyad Al-Jari	0	0	0	0	0	0
17	DF	(Uruguay) URU	Matías Aguirregaray	26	4	23+2	2	1	2
23	DF	(Saudi Arabia) KSA	Abdullah Al-Yousef	13	1	8+3	0	0+2	1
25	DF	(Saudi Arabia) KSA	Tawfiq Buhimed	28	2	18+7	1	3	1
78	DF	(Saudi Arabia) KSA	Ali Lajami	26	0	22	0	3+1	0
87	DF	(Saudi Arabia) KSA	Qassem Lajami	3	0	0+2	0	0+1	0
Midfielders
5	MF	(Morocco) MAR	Marwane Saâdane	32	8	28	7	4	1
6	MF	(Saudi Arabia) KSA	Ali Al-Hassan	23	2	18+4	2	1	0
8	MF	(Sudan) SDN	Mohammed Al-Dhaw	7	0	2+4	0	0+1	0
12	MF	(Saudi Arabia) KSA	Majed Kanabah	13	0	6+7	0	0	0
14	MF	(Saudi Arabia) KSA	Mohammed Al-Fuhaid	29	0	23+2	0	4	0
16	MF	(Saudi Arabia) KSA	Munther Al-Nakhli	7	0	1+5	0	0+1	0
18	MF	(Saudi Arabia) KSA	Mohammed Al-Saeed	18	2	6+8	0	3+1	2
26	MF	(Saudi Arabia) KSA	Ali Al-Zaqaan	31	3	18+9	3	4	0
27	MF	(Saudi Arabia) KSA	Saeed Al-Dossari	14	0	2+11	0	0+1	0
28	MF	(Algeria) ALG	Sofiane Bendebka	14	5	13+1	5	0	0
88	MF	(Norway) NOR	Gustav Wikheim	27	2	22+2	2	3	0
Forwards
7	FW	(Saudi Arabia) KSA	Saqer Otaif	6	0	0+5	0	0+1	0
9	FW	(Netherlands) NED	Mitchell te Vrede	29	14	25+1	12	3	2
19	FW	(Saudi Arabia) KSA	Mohammed Majrashi	20	2	5+13	2	1+1	0
21	FW	(Denmark) DEN	Bashkim Kadrii	14	2	11+3	2	0	0
Players sent out on loan this season
11	MF	(Serbia) SRB	Saša Jovanović	1	0	0+1	0	0	0
Player who made an appearance this season but have left the club
4	DF	(Portugal) POR	André Pinto	16	0	11+1	0	4	0
10	MF	(Tunisia) TUN	Abdelkader Oueslati	2	0	2	0	0	0
22	MF	(Poland) POL	Michał Janota	15	1	9+2	1	3+1	0

=== Goalscorers ===
Rank	No.	Pos	Nat	Name	Pro League	King Cup	Total
1	9	FW	(Netherlands)	Mitchell te Vrede	12	2	14
2	5	MF	(Morocco)	Marwane Saâdane	7	1	8
3	28	MF	(Algeria)	Sofiane Bendebka	5	0	5
4	17	DF	(Uruguay)	Matías Aguirregaray	2	2	4
5	26	MF	(Saudi Arabia)	Ali Al-Zaqaan	3	0	3
6	3	DF	(Saudi Arabia)	Mohammad Naji	2	0	2
6	6	MF	(Saudi Arabia)	Ali Al-Hassan	2	0	2
6	18	MF	(Saudi Arabia)	Mohammed Al-Saeed	0	2	2
6	19	FW	(Saudi Arabia)	Mohammed Majrashi	2	0	2
6	21	FW	(Denmark)	Bashkim Kadrii	2	0	2
6	25	DF	(Saudi Arabia)	Tawfiq Buhimed	1	1	2
6	88	MF	(Norway)	Gustav Wikheim	2	0	2
13	22	MF	(Poland)	Michał Janota	1	0	1
13	23	DF	(Saudi Arabia)	Abdullah Al-Yousef	0	1	1
Own goal					1	1	2
Total					42	10	52

Last Updated: 9 September 2020

=== Clean sheets ===
Rank	No.	Pos	Nat	Name	Pro League	King Cup	Total
1	30	GK	(Saudi Arabia)	Habib Al-Wotayan	4	0	4
2	35	GK	(Ukraine)	Maksym Koval	1	1	2
Total					5	1	6

Last Updated: 4 September 2020
