= 2021–22 Al Hilal SFC season =

Al-Hilal
2021–22 season
- President: Fahad bin Nafil Al-Otaibi
- Manager: Leonardo Jardim (until 14 February); Ramón Díaz (from 14 February)
- Stadium: King Fahd International Stadium
- Pro League: 1st
- King Cup: Runners-up
- 2021 ACL: Winners
- 2022 ACL: Group stage
- Super Cup: Winners
- Club World Cup: Fourth place
- Top goalscorer: League: Moussa Marega (13); All: Salem Al-Dawsari (18)
- Highest home attendance: 33,963 (vs. Al-Faisaly, 27 June 2022)
- Lowest home attendance: 5,211 (vs. Al-Taawoun, 15 January 2022)
- Average home league attendance: 12,887
Home colours	Away colours	Third colours

The 2021–22 season was Al-Hilal's 46th consecutive season in the top flight of Saudi football and 64th year in existence as a football club. The club participated in the Pro League, the King Cup, both the 2021 and 2022 editions of the AFC Champions League, and the Saudi Super Cup. Al-Hilal also competed in the FIFA Club World Cup following their triumph in the 2021 AFC Champions League final.

The season covered the period from 1 July 2021 to 30 June 2022.

== Players ==
=== Squad information ===
As of 1 September 2021

Note: Flags indicate national team as defined under FIFA eligibility rules; some limited exceptions apply. Players may hold more than one non-FIFA nationality.

No.	Pos.	Nation	Player
1	GK	KSA	Abdullah Al-Mayouf
2	DF	KSA	Mohammed Al-Breik
4	DF	KSA	Khalifah Al-Dawsari
5	DF	KSA	Ali Al Bulaihi
6	MF	COL	Gustavo Cuéllar
7	MF	KSA	Salman Al-Faraj (captain)
8	MF	KSA	Abdullah Otayf
10	FW	ARG	Luciano Vietto
11	FW	KSA	Saleh Al-Shehri
12	DF	KSA	Yasser Al-Shahrani
14	FW	KSA	Abdullah Al-Hamdan
15	MF	BRA	Matheus Pereira
16	MF	KSA	Nasser Al-Dawsari
17	FW	MLI	Moussa Marega
18	FW	FRA	Bafétimbi Gomis
19	MF	PER	André Carrillo

No.	Pos.	Nation	Player
20	DF	KOR	Jang Hyun-soo
22	DF	KSA	Amiri Kurdi
23	DF	KSA	Madallah Al-Olayan
28	MF	KSA	Mohamed Kanno
29	MF	KSA	Salem Al-Dawsari
32	DF	KSA	Muteb Al-Mufarrij
30	GK	KSA	Mohammed Al-Waked
31	GK	KSA	Habib Al-Wotayan
33	GK	KSA	Abdullah Al-Jadaani
39	MF	KSA	Suhaib Al-Zaid
43	MF	KSA	Musab Al-Juwayr
44	MF	KSA	Saad Al-Nasser
46	MF	KSA	Abdulrahman Al-Dakheel
49	FW	KSA	Abdullah Radif
70	DF	KSA	Mohammed Jahfali
88	DF	KSA	Hamad Al-Yami

=== Out on loan ===
Note: Flags indicate national team as defined under FIFA eligibility rules; some limited exceptions apply. Players may hold more than one non-FIFA nationality.

No.	Pos.	Nation	Player
26	MF	KSA	Fawaz Al-Torais (at Al-Fayha until 30 June 2022)
35	MF	KSA	Mansor Al-Beshe (at Al-Raed until 30 June 2022)
39	DF	KSA	Nawaf Al-Mufarrij (at Jeddah until 30 June 2022)

No.	Pos.	Nation	Player
40	GK	KSA	Nawaf Al-Ghamdi (at Al-Shoulla until 30 June 2022)
55	MF	KSA	Hamad Al-Abdan (at Al-Hazem until 30 June 2022)
—	DF	KSA	Mohammed Al-Nasser (at Al-Jabalain until 30 June 2022)

== Transfers and loans ==
=== Transfers in ===
Entry date	Position	No.	Player	From club	Fee	Ref.
30 June 2021	GK	30	(Saudi Arabia) Mohammed Al-Waked	(Saudi Arabia) Al-Qadsiah	End of loan	
30 June 2021	DF	54	(Saudi Arabia) Mohammed Al-Kunaydiri	(Saudi Arabia) Al-Adalah	End of loan	
30 June 2021	DF	–	(Saudi Arabia) Mohammed Al-Nasser	(Saudi Arabia) Al-Bukiryah	End of loan	
30 June 2021	MF	35	(Saudi Arabia) Mansor Al-Beshe	(Saudi Arabia) Al-Raed	End of loan	
30 June 2021	MF	39	(Saudi Arabia) Nawaf Sharahili	(Saudi Arabia) Al-Diriyah	End of loan	
30 June 2021	MF	41	(Saudi Arabia) Thaar Al-Otaibi	(Saudi Arabia) Abha	End of loan	
30 June 2021	FW	38	(Saudi Arabia) Khalid Al Jubaya	(Saudi Arabia) Al-Shoulla	End of loan	
30 June 2021	FW	–	(Saudi Arabia) Riyadh Al-Ghamdi	(Saudi Arabia) Najran	End of loan	
1 July 2021	DF	88	(Saudi Arabia) Hamad Al-Yami	(Saudi Arabia) Al-Qadsiah	Free	
1 July 2021	FW	17	(Mali) Moussa Marega	(Portugal) Porto	Free	
6 August 2021	MF	15	(Brazil) Matheus Pereira	(England) West Bromwich Albion	$20,000,000	
7 August 2021	DF	4	(Saudi Arabia) Khalifah Al-Dawsari	(Saudi Arabia) Al-Qadsiah	$2,133,000	
8 August 2021	MF	39	(Saudi Arabia) Suhaib Al-Zaid	(Saudi Arabia) Al-Orobah	Free	
9 January 2022	DF	13	(Saudi Arabia) Abdulrahman Al-Obaid	(Saudi Arabia) Al-Nassr	Free	
22 January 2022	DF	66	(Saudi Arabia) Saud Abdulhamid	(Saudi Arabia) Al-Ittihad	Swap	
22 January 2022	MF	26	(Saudi Arabia) Abdulellah Al-Malki	(Saudi Arabia) Al-Ittihad	$2,000,000	
28 January 2022	FW	96	(Brazil) Michael	(Brazil) Flamengo	$8,500,000	
29 January 2022	FW	9	(Nigeria) Odion Ighalo	(Saudi Arabia) Al-Shabab	$3,500,000	
30 January 2022	GK	21	(Saudi Arabia) Mohammed Al-Owais	(Saudi Arabia) Al-Ahli	$1,465,000	

=== Transfers out ===
Exit date	Position	No.	Player	To club	Fee	Ref.
4 July 2021	DF	54	(Saudi Arabia) Mohammed Al-Kunaydiri	(Saudi Arabia) Abha	Free	
11 July 2021	DF	–	(Saudi Arabia) Nawaf Al-Arifi	(Saudi Arabia) Al-Tai	Free	
11 July 2021	FW	38	(Saudi Arabia) Khalid Al Jubaya	(Saudi Arabia) Al-Shoulla	Free	
15 July 2021	MF	41	(Saudi Arabia) Thaar Al-Otaibi	(Saudi Arabia) Al-Hazem	Free	
16 July 2021	FW	–	(Saudi Arabia) Riyadh Al-Ghamdi	(Saudi Arabia) Damac	Free	
20 August 2021	MF	39	(Saudi Arabia) Nawaf Sharahili	(Saudi Arabia) Al-Sahel	Free	
31 August 2021	MF	27	(Saudi Arabia) Hattan Bahebri	(Saudi Arabia) Al-Shabab	$530,000	
7 September 2021	MF	–	(Saudi Arabia) Mohammed Al-Tofail	(Saudi Arabia) Al-Shoulla	Free	
13 January 2022	DF	22	(Saudi Arabia) Amiri Kurdi		Released	
22 January 2022	DF	23	(Saudi Arabia) Madallah Al-Olayan	(Saudi Arabia) Al-Ittihad	Swap	
29 January 2022	GK	30	(Saudi Arabia) Mohammed Al-Waked	(Saudi Arabia) Al-Jabalain	Free	
2 February 2022	FW	18	(France) Bafétimbi Gomis	(Turkey) Galatasaray	Free	

=== Loans out ===
Start date	End date	Position	No.	Player	To club	Fee	Ref.
2 July 2021	End of season	MF	35	(Saudi Arabia) Mansor Al-Beshe	(Saudi Arabia) Al-Raed	None	
7 July 2021	End of season	DF	–	(Saudi Arabia) Mohammed Al-Nasser	(Saudi Arabia) Al-Jabalain	None	
6 August 2021	End of season	GK	40	(Saudi Arabia) Nawaf Al-Ghamdi	(Saudi Arabia) Al-Shoulla	None	
17 August 2021	End of season	MF	55	(Saudi Arabia) Hamad Al-Abdan	(Saudi Arabia) Al-Hazem	None	
24 August 2021	End of season	MF	26	(Saudi Arabia) Fawaz Al-Torais	(Saudi Arabia) Al-Fayha	None	
1 September 2021	End of season	DF	39	(Saudi Arabia) Nawaf Al-Mufarrij	(Saudi Arabia) Jeddah	None	
4 January 2022	End of season	MF	34	(Saudi Arabia) Turki Al-Mutairi	(Saudi Arabia) Al-Kholood	None	
29 January 2022	End of season	MF	46	(Saudi Arabia) Abdulrahman Al-Dakheel	(Saudi Arabia) Al-Diriyah	None	
29 January 2022	End of season	FW	10	(Argentina) Luciano Vietto	(Saudi Arabia) Al-Shabab	None	
30 January 2022	End of season	GK	31	(Saudi Arabia) Habib Al-Wotayan	(Saudi Arabia) Al-Hazem	None	
30 January 2022	End of season	DF	4	(Saudi Arabia) Khalifah Al-Dawsari	(Saudi Arabia) Al-Fateh	None	

== Pre-season ==
11 July 2021 Friendly	Al-Hilal (Saudi Arabia)	2–3	(Saudi Arabia) Al-Taawoun	Riyadh, Saudi Arabia
20:00 AST	Marega 39'; Al-Abdan 60'	Report	Al-Hassan 55'; Sandro Manoel 63' (pen.); Abousaban 67' (pen.)	Stadium: Al-Hilal Club Stadium

22 July 2021 Friendly	Al-Hilal (Saudi Arabia)	3–1	(Serbia) Železničar Pančevo	Seeboden, Austria
17:00 CEST	Vietto 32'; Al-Shehri 68' (pen.), 70'	Report	Sikimić 15' (pen.)	Stadium: Sportarena Seeboden

25 July 2021 Friendly	Al-Hilal (Saudi Arabia)	3–0	(Slovenia) Ilirija	Seeboden, Austria
17:00 CEST	Kanno 60'; Al-Shehri 65'; Marega 80'	Report		Stadium: Sportarena Seeboden

30 July 2021 Friendly	Al-Hilal (Saudi Arabia)	2–3	(Germany) Hertha	Zell am See, Austria
18:00 CEST	Marega 7'; Gomis 79'	Report	Michelbrink 9'; Mittelstädt 20'; Jastrzembski 53'	Stadium: Alois Latini Stadion

31 July 2021 Friendly	Al-Hilal (Saudi Arabia)	0–1	(Germany) RB Leipzig	Grödig, Austria
CEST		Report	Forsberg (pen.)	Stadium: DAS.GOLDBERG Stadion

8 August 2021 Friendly	Al-Hilal (Saudi Arabia)	3–2	(Saudi Arabia) Al-Faisaly	Riyadh, Saudi Arabia
20:00 AST	Gomis; Carrillo; Al-Shehri	Report	Goal	Stadium: King Fahd International Stadium

== Competitions ==
=== Overview ===
Competition	Record							
Competition	G	W	D	L	GF	GA	GD	Win %
Pro League	30	20	7	3	63	28	+35	66.67
King Cup	4	3	1	0	7	3	+4	75.00
2021 ACL	4	4	0	0	9	1	+8	100.00
2022 ACL	6	4	1	1	11	5	+6	66.67
Super Cup	1	0	1	0	2	2	+0	0.00
Club World Cup	3	1	0	2	6	6	+0	33.33
Total	48	32	10	6	98	45	+53	66.67

Updated to match played 27 June 2022
Source: Competitions

=== Pro League ===
==== League table ====
Pos	Team	Pld	W	D	L	GF	GA	GD	Pts	Qualification or relegation
1	Al-Hilal (C)	30	20	7	3	63	28	+35	67	Qualification for AFC Champions League group stage (Note: Al-Fayha qualified for the AFC Champions League play-off round as 2021–22 King Cup winners.)
2	Al-Ittihad	30	20	5	5	62	29	+33	65	
3	Al-Nassr	30	19	4	7	58	36	+22	61	
4	Al-Shabab	30	15	10	5	52	36	+16	55	
5	Damac	30	12	8	10	38	44	−6	44	

Source: spl.com
Rules for classification: 1) Points; 2) Head-to-head points; 3) Head-to-head goal difference; 4) Total goal difference; 5) Total goals scored; 6) Fair-play points (Note: Head-to-head record is used only after all the matches between the teams in question have been played).
(C) Champions

==== Results summary ====
Overall								Home						Away					
Pld	W	D	L	GF	GA	GD	Pts	W	D	L	GF	GA	GD	W	D	L	GF	GA	GD
30	20	7	3	63	28	+35	67	11	2	2	31	15	+16	9	5	1	32	13	+19

Last updated: 27 June 2022.
Source: SPL.com.sa

==== Results by round ====
Round	1	2	3	4	5	6	7	8	9	10	11	12	13	14	15	16	17	18	19	20	21	22	23	24	25	26	27	28	29	30
Ground	H	A	H	H	H	A	A	H	H	A	H	H	A	H	A	A	H	A	A	A	H	H	A	A	H	A	A	H	A	H
Result	W	W	D	D	W	D	D	L	W	D	W	W	D	L	W	W	W	D	L	W	W	W	W	W	W	W	W	W	W	W
Position	4	1	2	4	2	2	4	7	4	4	4	4	4	5	5	4	4	4	4	4	4	4	4	2	2	2	2	2	1	1

Updated to match(es) played on 27 June 2022. Source: spl.com.sa
A = Away; H = Home; W = Win; D = Draw; L = Loss

==== Matches ====
All times are local, AST (UTC+3).

Win Draw Loss Postponed

14 August 2021 1	Al-Hilal	1–0	Al-Tai	Riyadh
20:55	Al-Bulaihi (yellow card) 40'; Al-Breik (yellow card) 66'; Al-Shehri 90+1'	Report	Majrashi (yellow card) 11'; Musona (yellow card) 64'	Stadium: King Fahd International Stadium; Attendance: 9,002; Referee: Saoud Al-Athbah (Qatar)

20 August 2021 2	Al-Taawoun	1–2	Al-Hilal	Buraidah
20:50	Tawamba 26', (yellow card) 38'; Al-Sobhi (yellow card) 37'; Amissi (yellow card) 41'; Kaku (yellow card) 51'; Santos (yellow card) 69'; Al-Nabit (yellow card) 90+6'	Report	Al-Breik (yellow card) 45+2'; Cuéllar (yellow card) 65'; Al-Bulaihi (yellow card) 71'; Marega 81'; Hyun-soo 90+3'; Pereira (yellow card) 90+5'	Stadium: King Abdullah Sport City Stadium; Attendance: 7,404; Referee: Mohammed Al-Hoaish

27 August 2021 3	Al-Hilal	0–0	Al-Batin	Riyadh
20:45	Marega (yellow card) 45+1'; Al-Faraj (yellow card) 51'	Report	Acquah (yellow card) 45+1'; Al-Rubaie (yellow card) 67'; Damdam (yellow card) 90+2'	Stadium: King Fahd International Stadium; Attendance: 11,457; Referee: Gery Vargas (Bolivia)

18 September 2021 5	Al-Hilal	3–2	Al-Ettifaq	Riyadh
18:30	Marega 24'; Gomis 56', 61'; Pereira (yellow card) 90'; Al-Mayouf (yellow card) 90+5'	Report	Hazaa Al-Hazaa 69'; Al-Rubaie (yellow card) 74'; Hawsawi 84'	Stadium: Prince Faisal bin Fahd Stadium; Attendance: 6,580; Referee: Salman Falahi (Qatar)

23 September 2021 6	Al-Shabab	2–2	Al-Hilal	Riyadh
20:25	Ighalo 2'; Bahebri (yellow card) 57', (goal) 61'	Report	Gomis 14' (pen.); Pereira (yellow card) 42'; Cuéllar (yellow card) 42'; Al Bulaihi (yellow card) 45+1', (goal) 70'; Kanno (yellow card) 55'	Stadium: King Fahd International Stadium; Attendance: 8,679; Referee: Turki Al-Khudhayr

30 September 2021 7	Al-Hazem	1–1	Al-Hilal	Ar Rass
20:20	Al-Obaid (yellow card) 12'; Moha 73' (pen.); Zidan (yellow card) 86'; Asselah (yellow card) 90+2'; Al-Harajin (yellow card) 90+11'	Report	Vietto (yellow card) 42'; Gomis 57'; Al-Faraj (yellow card) 90+6'	Stadium: Al-Hazem Club Stadium; Attendance: 2,756; Referee: Ahmed Al-Rumaikhani

23 October 2021 9	Al-Hilal	3–2	Al-Raed	Riyadh
20:00	Vietto 53', 61'; Kanno (yellow card) 66'; Jahfali (yellow card) 84'; Gomis 90+5'	Report	Al-Shehri 86'; Eder 88'; Al-Fahad (yellow card) 90+6'	Stadium: Prince Faisal bin Fahd Stadium; Attendance: 12,305; Referee: Artur Soares Dias (Portugal)

29 October 2021 10	Al-Ahli	1–1	Al-Hilal	Jeddah
19:50	Al-Asmari (yellow card) 16'; Hindi (yellow card) 42'; Ghareeb 71'; Bradarić (yellow card) 90+8'	Report	S. Al-Dawsari 10'; Cuéllar (yellow card) 33'; Al-Breik (yellow card) 42'; Kanno (yellow card) 84'; Pereira (yellow card) 90+8'	Stadium: Prince Abdullah Al-Faisal Stadium; Attendance: 24,202; Referee: Mohammed Al-Hoaish

4 November 2021 11	Al-Hilal	2–0	Damac	Riyadh
17:50	Gomis (yellow card) 24'; Jahfali (yellow card) 33'; Carrillo 56'; Al-Bulaihi (yellow card) 80'; Al-Juwayr 90+3'	Report		Stadium: Prince Faisal bin Fahd Stadium; Attendance: 14,944; Referee: Kevin Ortega (Peru)

28 November 2021 13	Abha	1–1	Al-Hilal	Abha
15:30	Bguir 43'; Suárez (yellow card) 82'	Report	Marega 18'; Gomis (yellow card) 36'; Al-Shehri (yellow card) 83'	Stadium: Prince Sultan bin Abdul Aziz Stadium; Attendance: 12,243; Referee: Turki Al-Khudhayr

10 December 2021 4	Al-Hilal	0–0	Al-Fayha	Riyadh
17:40	Kanno (yellow card) 25'	Report	Ryller (yellow card) 34'; Al-Rashidi (yellow card) 90+2'; Al-Safri (yellow card) 90+4'	Stadium: King Fahd International Stadium; Attendance: 13,880; Referee: Ilgiz Tantashev (Uzbekistan)

16 December 2021 8	Al-Hilal	0–2	Al-Nassr	Riyadh
15:15	Gomis (yellow card) 27'; Al-Faraj (yellow card) 43'; Pereira (yellow card) 45+3'	Report	Yahya (yellow card) 34'; Aboubakar 39'; Al-Shammari (yellow card) 49'; Al-Hassan (yellow card) 54'; Talisca 90', (yellow card) 90+2'	Stadium: King Fahd International Stadium; Attendance: 24,175; Referee: Paolo Valeri (Italy)

25 December 2021 14	Al-Hilal	2–3	Al-Fateh	Riyadh
17:50	Carrillo 12'; Gomis 75'	Report	Batna 16', 87' (pen.); Al-Zaqaan (yellow card) 53'; Al-Hassan (yellow card) 57'; Al-Daheem (yellow card) 68'; Bendebka 71'; Al-Fuhaid (yellow card) 90+1'	Stadium: Prince Faisal bin Fahd Stadium; Attendance: 6,091; Referee: Derlis Fabián López (Paraguay)

31 December 2021 15	Al-Faisaly	2–3	Al-Hilal	Al Majma'ah
18:05	Silva 6'; Amalfitano 48'; Al-Amri (yellow card) 59'	Report	Al-Breik (yellow card) 35'; Al-Bulaihi (yellow card) 41'; Gomis 55' (pen.), 79'; S. Al-Dawsari 59'; Kanno (yellow card) 70'	Stadium: Al Majma'ah Sports City; Attendance: 3,500; Referee: Majed Al-Shamrani

11 January 2022 16	Al-Tai	0–4	Al-Hilal	Ha'il
15:40	Al-Jubairi (yellow card) 31'	Report	Hyun-soo 2'; Marega 18', 71'; Al-Olayan 54'	Stadium: Prince Abdul Aziz bin Musa'ed Stadium; Attendance: 5,098; Referee: Abdullah Al-Shehri

15 January 2022 17	Al-Hilal	3–2	Al-Taawoun	Riyadh
20:00	Kanno 29'; S. Al-Dawsari 45' (pen.); Pereira (yellow card) 45+3'; Marega 47'	Report	Tawamba 6' (pen.); Luvannor 24' (pen.), (yellow card) 71'; Medrán (yellow card) 39'	Stadium: Prince Faisal bin Fahd Stadium; Attendance: 5,211; Referee: Óscar Macías Romo (Mexico)

21 January 2022 18	Al-Batin	1–1	Al-Hilal	Hafar al-Batin
15:30	Abreu 31'; Sami (yellow card) 39'; Chaves (yellow card) 53'; D. Al-Qarni (yellow card) 59'	Report	Gomis 54' (pen.)	Stadium: Al-Batin Club Stadium; Attendance: 2,300; Referee: Mohammed Al-Hoaish

17 February 2022 21	Al-Hilal	5–0	Al-Shabab	Riyadh
20:40	Ighalo 18', 43'; Carrillo 25'; Marega 30', 82'; Abdulhamid (yellow card) 60'; Al-Faraj (yellow card) 78'; Cuéllar (yellow card) 86'	Report	N'Diaye (yellow card) 56' (yellow-red card) 64'; Santos (yellow card) 90+5'	Stadium: Prince Faisal bin Fahd Stadium; Attendance: 7,704; Referee: Mario Díaz de Vivar (Paraguay)

26 February 2022 22	Al-Hilal	2–0	Al-Hazem	Riyadh
18:25	Carrillo 57'; Pereira (yellow card) 64'; Abdulhamid (yellow card) 82'; Marega 89'; Al-Juwayr (red card) 90+9'	Report	Al-Khalaf (yellow card) 10'; Zidan (yellow card) 83'; S. Al-Harthi (yellow card) 90+3'	Stadium: Prince Faisal bin Fahd Stadium; Attendance: 7,915; Referee: Ovidiu Hațegan (Romania)

3 March 2022 23	Al-Nassr	0–4	Al-Hilal	Riyadh
21:00	Martínez (yellow card) 45+2'; Talisca (yellow card) 51'; Funes Mori (red card) 63'	Report	Pereira 16'; S. Al-Dawsari 34', 45+2', (yellow card) 47'; Al-Bulaihi (yellow card) 41'; Cuéllar (yellow card) 52'; Ighalo 75'; Kanno (yellow card) 83'	Stadium: Mrsool Park; Attendance: 11,913; Referee: Sergei Karasev (Russia)

8 March 2021 12	Al-Hilal	2–1	Al-Ittihad	Riyadh
20:45	S. Al-Dawsari 16' (pen.); Cuéllar (yellow card) 32'; Jang Hyun-soo (yellow card) 52'; Ighalo 68'	Report	Camara 59'	Stadium: Prince Faisal bin Fahd Stadium; Attendance: 16,472; Referee: Raphael Claus (Brazil)

13 March 2022 24	Al-Raed	0–1	Al-Hilal	Buraidah
18:50	Al-Rehaili (yellow card) 82'	Report	Marega 89'	Stadium: King Abdullah Sport City Stadium; Attendance: 20,082; Referee: Sultan Al-Harbi

18 March 2022 25	Al-Hilal	4–2	Al-Ahli	Riyadh
20:50	Ighalo 11', 34', 45+3'; Hyun-soo (yellow card) 45'; Marega 58'	Report	Yahya (yellow card) 18'; Al Somah 69' (pen.); Alioski 90+6'	Stadium: Prince Faisal bin Fahd Stadium; Attendance: 14,775; Referee: Georgi Kabakov (Bulgaria)

3 May 2022 19	Al-Fayha	1–0	Al-Hilal	Al Majma'ah
19:10	Al-Khaibari 33'; Ryller (yellow card) 90'; Al-Baqawi (yellow card) 90+6'	Report	Michael (yellow card) 84'; Cuéllar (yellow card) 90+6'	Stadium: Al Majma'ah Sports City; Attendance: 6,150; Referee: Majed Al-Shamrani

7 May 2022 26	Damac	2–4	Al-Hilal	Abha
19:10	Zelaya 3' (pen.); Al-Shamrani (yellow card) 30'; Hamzi 40'; Nono (yellow card) 62'	Report	Al-Juwayr 36'; Al-Bulaihi (yellow card) 58'; Pereira 75', (yellow card) 78'; Marega 79'; Ighalo 90+2'	Stadium: Prince Sultan bin Abdul Aziz Stadium; Attendance: 10,612; Referee: Shukri Al-Hanfoush

11 May 2022 20	Al-Ettifaq	0–2	Al-Hilal	Dammam
18:55	Al-Kuwaykibi (yellow card) 56'	Report	Al-Bulaihi 30'; Ighalo 51' (pen.)	Stadium: Prince Mohamed bin Fahd Stadium; Attendance: 15,670; Referee: Fernando Rapallini (Argentina)

23 May 2022 27	Al-Ittihad	1–3	Al-Hilal	Jeddah
21:00	Romarinho 32' (pen.), (yellow card) 45+11'; Al-Bishi (yellow card) 57'	Report	Hyun-soo (yellow card) 29'; Michael 42', 69'; S. Al-Dawsari 66'	Stadium: King Abdullah Sports City; Attendance: 58,755; Referee: Mohammed Al-Hoaish

29 May 2022 28	Al-Hilal	2–0	Abha	Riyadh
21:00	Ighalo (yellow card) 30', (goal) 80'; Al-Bulaihi 55'; Al-Faraj (yellow card) 72'	Report	Sharahili (yellow card) 44'; Al-Amri (yellow card) 64'	Stadium: Prince Faisal bin Fahd Stadium; Attendance: 8,830; Referee: Artur Soares Dias (Portugal)

23 June 2022 29	Al-Fateh	0–3	Al-Hilal	Al-Hasa
21:00	Al-Khulaif (yellow card) 4'; Cueva (yellow card) 64'; Al-Daheem (yellow card) 68'; Petros (yellow card) 71'	Report	S. Al-Dawsari 10', 39'; Cuéllar (yellow card) 25' (yellow-red card) 45'; Hyun-soo (yellow card) 38'; Marega 80'; Al-Bulaihi (yellow card) 82'	Stadium: Prince Abdullah bin Jalawi Stadium; Attendance: 17,459; Referee: Roberto Tobar (Chile)

27 June 2022 30	Al-Hilal	2–1	Al-Faisaly	Riyadh
21:00	Ighalo 7', 64'; Michael (yellow card) 86'; Carrillo (yellow card) 90'	Report	Al-Qumayzi (yellow card) 45+2'; Clayson 70'; Al-Amri (yellow card) 83'; Al-Saiari (yellow card) 90+6'; Malayekah (yellow card) 90+6'; Qassem (red card) 90+10'	Stadium: King Fahd International Stadium; Attendance: 33,963; Referee: Anastasios Sidiropoulos (Greece)

=== King Cup ===
All times are local, AST (UTC+3).

20 December 2021 Round of 16	Al-Hilal	2–0	Al-Raed	Riyadh
20:00	Vietto 5'; Al-Shehri (yellow card) 6'; Carrillo 75'	Report	Fouzair (yellow card) 8'; Salem (yellow card) 15' (yellow-red card) 77'; Al-Farhan (yellow card) 77'	Stadium: King Fahd International Stadium; Referee: Sandro Schärer (Switzerland)

21 February 2022 Quarter-finals	Al-Nassr	1–2	Al-Hilal	Riyadh
18:25	Talisca 17'; Martínez (yellow card) 23'; Rodríguez (yellow card) 44'; Aboubakar (yellow card) 76'; Al-Shammari (yellow card) 90+5'	Report	Al-Shahrani (yellow card) 25'; Al-Dawsari (yellow card) 43', (goal) 80' (pen.); Al-Bulaihi (yellow card) 49'; Ighalo 62'; Marega (yellow card) 81'	Stadium: Mrsool Park; Referee: Mustapha Ghorbal (Algeria)

3 April 2022 Semi-finals	Al-Hilal	2–1	Al-Shabab	Riyadh
22:00	Al-Shahrani (yellow card) 65'; Al-Faraj 73'; Ighalo 104'; Al-Shehri (yellow card) 113'	Report	N'Diaye (yellow card) 39'; Banega 63' (pen.); Al-Ammar (yellow card) 80'	Stadium: Prince Faisal bin Fahd Stadium; Referee: Roberto Tobar (Chile)

19 May 2022 Final	Al-Fayha	1–1 (a.e.t.) (3–1 p)	Al-Hilal	Jeddah
21:30	Lopes 66'; Stojković (yellow card) 90+4'; Al-Shuwaish (yellow card) 120+1'	Report	S. Al-Dawsari (yellow card) 37', (goal) 45+4'; Al-Faraj (yellow card) 105'; Jahfali (yellow card) 105'	Stadium: King Abdullah Sports City; Attendance: 46,533; Referee: Antonio Mateu Lahoz (Spain)
	Penalties
	Ryller (penalty missed); Lopes (penalty scored); Al-Zaqaan (penalty scored); Al-Shuwaish (penalty missed); Tachtsidis (penalty scored)		(penalty missed) Ighalo; (penalty missed) Al-Faraj; (penalty missed) Al-Hamdan; (penalty scored) Al-Juwayr

=== Saudi Super Cup ===
All times are local, AST (UTC+3).

6 January 2022 Final	Al-Hilal	2–2 (4–3 p)	Al-Faisaly	Riyadh
20:15	Al-Mayouf (yellow card) 27'; Jang Hyun-soo (yellow card) 31'; Al-Dawsari 40'; Al-Shahrani 53'; Al-Bulaihi (yellow card) 79'	Report	Al-Amri 16'; Amalfitano 24'; Al-Amri (yellow card) 42'; Tavares (red card) 45+3'; Barnawi (yellow card) 70'	Stadium: Prince Faisal bin Fahd Stadium; Attendance: 6,164; Referee: Danny Makkelie (Netherlands)
	Penalties
	Marega (penalty scored); Al-Hamdan (penalty scored); Al-Dawsari (penalty scored); Pereira (penalty missed); Gomis (penalty missed); Al-Faraj (penalty scored)		Guilherme (penalty scored); Ismael (penalty scored); Al-Saiari (penalty missed); Silva (penalty missed); Rossi (penalty scored); Al-Ahmed (penalty missed)

=== 2021 AFC Champions League ===
==== Knockout phase ====
13 September 2021 Round of 16	Esteghlal (Iran)	0–2	(Saudi Arabia) Al-Hilal	Dubai, United Arab Emirates
21:00 UTC+4	Moradmand (yellow card) 79'	Live Report; Stats Report	Gomis 39'; N. Al-Dawsari (yellow card) 42'; S. Al-Dawsari 56'	Stadium: Zabeel Stadium; Attendance: 0 Referee: Fu Ming (China)

16 October 2021 Quarter-finals	Persepolis (Iran)	0–3	(Saudi Arabia) Al-Hilal	Riyadh, Saudi Arabia
21:00 UTC+3	Asadi (yellow card) 35'; Aghaei (yellow card) 47'; Faraji (yellow card) 57'; Sharifi (yellow card) 80'	Live Report; Stats Report	S. Al-Dawsari 27'; Gomis 50', 70'; Marega (yellow card) 61'; Al-Bulaihi (yellow card) 72'	Stadium: Prince Faisal bin Fahd Stadium; Attendance: 14,877; Referee: Ryuji Sato (Japan)

19 October 2021 Semi-finals	Al-Nassr (Saudi Arabia)	1–2	(Saudi Arabia) Al-Hilal	Riyadh, Saudi Arabia
21:00 UTC+3	Lajami (red card) 45+2'; Talisca 50'; Al-Ghanam (yellow card) 75'; Al-Amri (yellow card) 85'	Live Report	Marega 17'; Hyun-soo (yellow card) 21'; Al-Bulaihi (yellow card) 63'; S. Al-Dawsari 71'	Stadium: Mrsool Park; Attendance: 23,985; Referee: Chris Beath

23 November 2021 Final	Al-Hilal (Saudi Arabia)	2–0	(South Korea) Pohang Steelers	Riyadh, Saudi Arabia
19:00 UTC+3	N. Al-Dawsari 1'; Marega (yellow card) 26', (goal) 63'; Kanno (yellow card) 83'; Pereira (yellow card) 84'	Live Report; Stats Report	Grant (yellow card) 20'; Gwon Wan-gyu (yellow card) 42'; Jeon Min-gwang (yellow card) 53'; Lim Sang-hyub (yellow card) 67'	Stadium: King Fahd International Stadium; Attendance: 50,171; Referee: Mohammed Abdulla Hassan Mohamed (United Arab Emirates)

=== 2022 AFC Champions League ===
==== Group stage ====
Pos	Team	Pld	W	D	L	GF	GA	GD	Pts	Qualification	HIL	RYN	SHJ	IST
1	(Saudi Arabia) Al-Hilal (H)	6	4	1	1	11	5	+6	13 (Note: Equal on head-to-head points. Head-to-head goal difference: Al-Hilal +1, Al-Rayyan –1.)	Advance to Round of 16	—	0–2	2–1	1–0
2	(Qatar) Al-Rayyan	6	4	1	1	10	7	+3	13	Advance to Round of 16	0–3	—	3–1	1–0
3	(United Arab Emirates) Sharjah	6	1	2	3	7	11	−4	5		2–2	1–1	—	2–1
4	(Tajikistan) Istiklol	6	1	0	5	5	10	−5	3		0–3	2–3	2–0	—

Source: AFC
Rules for classification: Tiebreakers
(H) Hosts
Notes:

8 April 2022 1	Al-Hilal (Saudi Arabia)	2–1	(United Arab Emirates) Sharjah	Riyadh, Saudi Arabia
23:15 UTC+3	Al-Shehri 5'; Michael 62'	Report	Shukurov 7'; Caio (yellow card) 81'; Al-Hosani (yellow card) 85'	Stadium: Prince Faisal bin Fahd Stadium; Attendance: 13,579; Referee: Ma Ning (China)

11 April 2022 2	Al-Rayyan (Qatar)	0–3	(Saudi Arabia) Al-Hilal	Riyadh, Saudi Arabia
20:15 UTC+3	Abouelela (yellow card) 29'	Report	Al-Hamdan 27'; Kanno 49', (yellow card) 63'; Al-Dawsari 87'	Stadium: Prince Faisal bin Fahd Stadium; Attendance: 9,810; Referee: Adham Makhadmeh (Jordan)

15 April 2022 3	Al-Hilal (Saudi Arabia)	1–0	(Tajikistan) Istiklol	Riyadh, Saudi Arabia
23:15 UTC+3	Al-Faraj 52'	Report	Rakhimov (yellow card) 63'; Imomnazarov (yellow card) 90+3'	Stadium: Prince Faisal bin Fahd Stadium; Attendance: 13,158; Referee: Ahmed Al-Kaf (Oman)

19 April 2022 4	Istiklol (Tajikistan)	0–3	(Saudi Arabia) Al-Hilal	Riyadh, Saudi Arabia
23:15 UTC+3		Report	Ighalo 8', 33'; S. Al-Dawsari (yellow card) 18', (goal) 90+2'	Stadium: Prince Faisal bin Fahd Stadium; Attendance: 10,241; Referee: Hanna Hattab (Syria)

23 April 2022 5	Sharjah (United Arab Emirates)	2–2	(Saudi Arabia) Al-Hilal	Riyadh, Saudi Arabia
23:15 UTC+3	Camara 5'; Rashid 45+1'; Bernard (yellow card) 52'; Caio (yellow card) 67'; Abdulrahman (yellow card) 90+2'; Shukurov (yellow card) 90+3'; Al-Hosani (yellow card) 90+5'	Report	Abdulhamid (yellow card) 42'; Al-Mufarrij 78'; Jahfali (yellow card) 85'; S. Al-Dawsari 90+6' (pen.)	Stadium: Prince Faisal bin Fahd Stadium; Referee: Mohanad Qasim Sarray (Iraq)

27 April 2022 6	Al-Hilal (Saudi Arabia)	0–2	(Qatar) Al-Rayyan	Riyadh, Saudi Arabia
23:15 UTC+3	Al-Breik (yellow card) 11'; Marega (yellow card) 32'; Al-Hamdan (yellow card) 77'	Report	Jang Hyun-soo 5' (o.g.); Al-Tairi (yellow card) 27'; Boli 43'; Traoré (yellow card) 73'; Younes (yellow card) 88'	Stadium: Prince Faisal bin Fahd Stadium; Referee: Jumpei Iida (Japan)

=== FIFA Club World Cup ===
6 February 2022 Second round	Al Hilal (Saudi Arabia)	6–1	(United Arab Emirates) Al Jazira	Abu Dhabi, United Arab Emirates
20:30 GST (UTC+4)	Ighalo 36'; Pereira 40'; Kanno 57'; Al-Dawsari 77'; Marega 88'; Carrillo 90+2'	Report	Diaby 14'; Kosanović (yellow card) 46'; Rabii (yellow card) 89'	Stadium: Al Nahyan Stadium; Attendance: 12,538; Referee: Chris Beath (Australia)

9 February 2022 Semi-finals	Al-Hilal (Saudi Arabia)	0–1	(England) Chelsea	Abu Dhabi, United Arab Emirates
20:30 GST (UTC+4)	Cuéllar (yellow card) 66'; Al-Bulaihi (yellow card) 84'	Report	Lukaku 32'; Kovačić (yellow card) 81'	Stadium: Mohammed bin Zayed Stadium; Attendance: 19,175; Referee: César Ramos (Mexico)

12 February 2022 Match for third place	Al-Hilal (Saudi Arabia)	0–4	(Egypt) Al Ahly	Abu Dhabi, United Arab Emirates
17:00 GST (UTC+4)	Pereira (red card) 14'; Kanno (red card) 28'; Al-Faraj (yellow card) 58'	Report	Ibrahim 8', 17'; Hany (yellow card) 32'; Abdel Kader 40'; Taher (yellow card) 45+6'; Sherif (yellow card) 55'; El Solia 64'	Stadium: Al Nahyan Stadium; Attendance: 9,008; Referee: Clément Turpin (France)

== Statistics ==
=== Appearances ===
Last updated on 27 June 2022.

No.	Pos	Nat	Player	Total		Pro League		King Cup		2021 ACL		2022 ACL		Super Cup		Club World Cup	
No.	Pos	Nat	Player	Apps	Goals	Apps	Goals	Apps	Goals	Apps	Goals	Apps	Goals	Apps	Goals	Apps	Goals
Goalkeepers
1	GK	(Saudi Arabia) KSA	Abdullah Al-Mayouf	45	0	29	0	4	0	4	0	5	0	1	0	2	0
21	GK	(Saudi Arabia) KSA	Mohammed Al-Owais	3	0	1	0	0	0	0	0	1	0	0	0	1	0
33	GK	(Saudi Arabia) KSA	Abdullah Al-Jadaani	0	0	0	0	0	0	0	0	0	0	0	0	0	0
Defenders
2	DF	(Saudi Arabia) KSA	Mohammed Al-Breik	27	0	12+1	0	2	0	4	0	4	0	1	0	1+2	0
5	DF	(Saudi Arabia) KSA	Ali Al Bulaihi	35	3	22	3	3	0	3	0	3+1	0	1	0	2	0
12	DF	(Saudi Arabia) KSA	Yasser Al-Shahrani	39	1	20+3	0	3	0	1+2	0	5+1	0	1	1	3	0
13	DF	(Saudi Arabia) KSA	Abdulrahman Al-Obaid	4	0	0+1	0	0	0	0	0	1+2	0	0	0	0	0
20	DF	(South Korea) KOR	Jang Hyun-soo	40	2	25	2	4	0	4	0	3	0	1	0	3	0
32	DF	(Saudi Arabia) KSA	Muteb Al-Mufarrij	18	1	8+3	0	1	0	1	0	3	1	0	0	1+1	0
66	DF	(Saudi Arabia) KSA	Saud Abdulhamid	23	0	10+3	0	1+2	0	0	0	2+3	0	0	0	2	0
67	DF	(Saudi Arabia) KSA	Mohammed Al-Khaibari	0	0	0	0	0	0	0	0	0	0	0	0	0	0
70	DF	(Saudi Arabia) KSA	Mohammed Jahfali	30	0	7+9	0	0+3	0	0+4	0	3+2	0	0	0	0+2	0
88	DF	(Saudi Arabia) KSA	Hamad Al-Yami	18	0	5+8	0	1	0	0+3	0	0	0	0+1	0	0	0
Midfielders
6	MF	(Colombia) COL	Gustavo Cuéllar	33	0	20+3	0	3	0	0	0	4	0	0	0	3	0
7	MF	(Saudi Arabia) KSA	Salman Al-Faraj	38	2	20+2	0	4	1	4	0	5+1	1	1	0	0+1	0
8	MF	(Saudi Arabia) KSA	Abdullah Otayf	7	0	3+3	0	1	0	0	0	0	0	0	0	0	0
15	MF	(Brazil) BRA	Matheus Pereira	34	3	15+6	2	2	0	4	0	3	0	1	0	3	1
16	MF	(Saudi Arabia) KSA	Nasser Al-Dawsari	24	2	11+3	0	1	0	4	1	1+4	1	0	0	0	0
19	MF	(Peru) PER	André Carrillo	28	6	17+5	4	2	1	0	0	0	0	0+1	0	1+2	1
28	MF	(Saudi Arabia) KSA	Mohamed Kanno	30	3	10+6	1	1	0	3	0	5+1	1	1	0	3	1
29	MF	(Saudi Arabia) KSA	Salem Al-Dawsari	36	18	18+4	9	2	2	4	3	4	2	1	1	3	1
43	MF	(Saudi Arabia) KSA	Musab Al-Juwayr	15	2	4+4	2	0+3	0	0+2	0	0+1	0	0	0	0+1	0
56	MF	(Saudi Arabia) KSA	Mohammed Al-Qahtani	2	0	0+1	0	0+1	0	0	0	0	0	0	0	0	0
57	MF	(Saudi Arabia) KSA	Nasser Hadhood	0	0	0	0	0	0	0	0	0	0	0	0	0	0
96	MF	(Brazil) BRA	Michael	20	3	8+3	2	0+3	0	0	0	3	1	0	0	0+3	0
Forwards
9	FW	(Nigeria) NGR	Odion Ighalo	22	17	13	12	3	2	0	0	4	2	0	0	2	1
11	FW	(Saudi Arabia) KSA	Saleh Al-Shehri	26	2	2+17	1	1+2	0	0+3	0	1	1	0	0	0	0
14	FW	(Saudi Arabia) KSA	Abdullah Al-Hamdan	28	1	1+15	0	0+3	0	0+2	0	2+4	1	0+1	0	0	0
17	FW	(Mali) MLI	Moussa Marega	43	16	23+4	13	4	0	4	2	4	0	1	0	3	1
49	FW	(Saudi Arabia) KSA	Abdullah Radif	3	0	0+2	0	0	0	0	0	0+1	0	0	0	0	0
Players sent out on loan this season
4	DF	(Saudi Arabia) KSA	Khalifah Al-Dawsari	2	0	0+2	0	0	0	0	0	0	0	0	0	0	0
10	FW	(Argentina) ARG	Luciano Vietto	14	3	8+5	2	1	1	0	0	0	0	0	0	0	0
31	GK	(Saudi Arabia) KSA	Habib Al-Wotayan	0	0	0	0	0	0	0	0	0	0	0	0	0	0
Player who made an appearance this season but have left the club
18	FW	(France) FRA	Bafétimbi Gomis	23	12	12+5	9	0+1	0	4	3	0	0	1	0	0	0
22	DF	(Saudi Arabia) KSA	Amiri Kurdi	0	0	0	0	0	0	0	0	0	0	0	0	0	0
23	DF	(Saudi Arabia) KSA	Madallah Al-Olayan	9	1	6+1	1	0+1	0	0+1	0	0	0	0	0	0	0

=== Goalscorers ===
Rank	No.	Pos	Nat	Name	Pro League	King Cup	2021 ACL	2022 ACL	Super Cup	Club World Cup	Total
1	29	MF	(Saudi Arabia)	Salem Al-Dawsari	9	2	3	2	1	1	18
2	9	FW	(Nigeria)	Odion Ighalo	12	2	0	2	0	1	17
3	17	FW	(Mali)	Moussa Marega	13	0	2	0	0	1	16
4	18	FW	(France)	Bafétimbi Gomis	9	0	3	0	0	0	12
5	19	MF	(Peru)	André Carrillo	4	1	0	0	0	1	6
6	5	DF	(Saudi Arabia)	Ali Al Bulaihi	3	0	0	0	0	0	3
6	10	FW	(Argentina)	Luciano Vietto	2	1	0	0	0	0	3
6	15	MF	(Brazil)	Matheus Pereira	2	0	0	0	0	1	3
6	28	MF	(Saudi Arabia)	Mohamed Kanno	1	0	0	1	0	1	3
6	96	MF	(Brazil)	Michael	2	0	0	1	0	0	3
11	7	MF	(Saudi Arabia)	Salman Al-Faraj	0	1	0	1	0	0	2
11	11	FW	(Saudi Arabia)	Saleh Al-Shehri	1	0	0	1	0	0	2
11	16	MF	(Saudi Arabia)	Nasser Al-Dawsari	0	0	1	1	0	0	2
11	20	DF	(South Korea)	Jang Hyun-soo	2	0	0	0	0	0	2
11	43	MF	(Saudi Arabia)	Musab Al-Juwayr	2	0	0	0	0	0	2
16	12	DF	(Saudi Arabia)	Yasser Al-Shahrani	0	0	0	0	1	0	1
16	14	FW	(Saudi Arabia)	Abdullah Al-Hamdan	0	0	0	1	0	0	1
16	23	DF	(Saudi Arabia)	Madallah Al-Olayan	1	0	0	0	0	0	1
16	32	DF	(Saudi Arabia)	Muteb Al-Mufarrij	0	0	0	1	0	0	1
Own goal					0	0	0	0	0	0	0
Total					63	7	9	11	2	6	98

Last Updated: 27 June 2022

=== Assists ===
Rank	No.	Pos	Nat	Name	Pro League	King Cup	2021 ACL	2022 ACL	Super Cup	Club World Cup	Total
1	15	MF	(Brazil)	Matheus Pereira	11	0	2	1	0	1	15
2	29	MF	(Saudi Arabia)	Salem Al-Dawsari	5	0	1	0	0	1	7
3	17	FW	(Mali)	Moussa Marega	2	0	1	0	1	1	5
4	7	MF	(Saudi Arabia)	Salman Al-Faraj	1	2	0	1	0	0	4
4	9	FW	(Nigeria)	Odion Ighalo	4	0	0	0	0	0	4
4	12	DF	(Saudi Arabia)	Yasser Al-Shahrani	3	0	0	1	0	0	4
4	16	MF	(Saudi Arabia)	Nasser Al-Dawsari	4	0	0	0	0	0	4
4	96	MF	(Brazil)	Michael	3	0	0	1	0	0	4
9	2	DF	(Saudi Arabia)	Mohammed Al-Breik	0	0	0	2	1	0	3
9	10	FW	(Argentina)	Luciano Vietto	2	1	0	0	0	0	3
9	66	DF	(Saudi Arabia)	Saud Abdulhamid	2	1	0	0	0	0	3
12	14	FW	(Saudi Arabia)	Abdullah Al-Hamdan	1	0	0	1	0	0	2
12	18	FW	(France)	Bafétimbi Gomis	0	0	2	0	0	0	2
12	19	MF	(Peru)	André Carrillo	2	0	0	0	0	0	2
12	28	MF	(Saudi Arabia)	Mohamed Kanno	1	0	1	0	0	0	2
16	6	MF	(Colombia)	Gustavo Cuéllar	1	0	0	0	0	0	1
16	8	MF	(Saudi Arabia)	Abdullah Otayf	1	0	0	0	0	0	1
16	20	DF	(South Korea)	Jang Hyun-soo	1	0	0	0	0	0	1
16	49	FW	(Saudi Arabia)	Abdullah Radif	0	0	0	1	0	0	1
16	70	DF	(Saudi Arabia)	Mohammed Jahfali	0	0	0	0	0	1	1
16	88	DF	(Saudi Arabia)	Hamad Al-Yami	1	0	0	0	0	0	1
Total					45	4	7	8	2	4	70

Last Updated: 27 June 2022

=== Clean sheets ===
Rank	No.	Pos	Nat	Name	Pro League	King Cup	2021 ACL	2022 ACL	Super Cup	Club World Cup	Total
1	1	GK	(Saudi Arabia)	Abdullah Al-Mayouf	11	1	3	3	0	0	18
2	21	GK	(Saudi Arabia)	Mohammed Al-Owais	1	0	0	0	0	0	1
Total					12	1	3	3	0	0	19

Last Updated: 23 June 2022
