= 2020–21 Al Hilal SFC season =

Al-Hilal
2020–21 season
- President: Fahad bin Nafil Al-Otaibi
- Manager: Răzvan Lucescu (until 15 February); Rogério Micale (from 15 February until 2 May); José Morais (from 2 May)
- Stadium: King Fahd International Stadium
- Pro League: 1st
- King Cup: Round of 16 (knocked out by Al-Fateh)
- Champions League: Round of 16
- Super Cup: Runners-up (knocked out by Al-Nassr)
- Top goalscorer: League: Bafétimbi Gomis (24); All: Bafétimbi Gomis (27)
Home colours	Away colours	Third colours

The 2020–21 season was Al-Hilal's 45th consecutive season in the top flight of Saudi football and 63rd year in existence as a football club. The club participated in the Pro League, the King Cup, the AFC Champions League and the Saudi Super Cup.

The season covered the period from 24 September 2020 to 30 June 2021.

== Players ==
=== Squad information ===
As of 7 February 2020

Note: Flags indicate national team as defined under FIFA eligibility rules; some limited exceptions apply. Players may hold more than one non-FIFA nationality.

No.	Pos.	Nation	Player
1	GK	KSA	Abdullah Al-Mayouf
2	DF	KSA	Mohammed Al-Breik
5	DF	KSA	Ali Al Bulaihi
6	MF	COL	Gustavo Cuéllar
7	MF	KSA	Salman Al-Faraj (captain)
8	MF	KSA	Abdullah Otayf
9	FW	ITA	Sebastian Giovinco
10	FW	ARG	Luciano Vietto
11	FW	KSA	Saleh Al-Shehri
12	DF	KSA	Yasser Al-Shahrani
14	FW	KSA	Abdullah Al-Hamdan
16	MF	KSA	Nasser Al-Dawsari
18	FW	FRA	Bafétimbi Gomis
19	MF	PER	André Carrillo
20	DF	KOR	Jang Hyun-soo
22	DF	KSA	Amiri Kurdi

No.	Pos.	Nation	Player
23	DF	KSA	Madallah Al-Olayan
26	MF	KSA	Fawaz Al-Torais
27	MF	KSA	Hattan Bahebri
28	MF	KSA	Mohamed Kanno
29	MF	KSA	Salem Al-Dawsari
31	GK	KSA	Habib Al-Wotayan
32	DF	KSA	Muteb Al-Mufarrij
33	GK	KSA	Abdullah Al-Jadaani
34	FW	KSA	Turki Al-Mutairi
40	GK	KSA	Nawaf Al-Ghamdi
44	MF	KSA	Saad Al Nasser
49	FW	KSA	Abdullah Rudaif
50	GK	KSA	Abdullah Al-Bishi
55	MF	KSA	Hamad Al-Abdan
60	GK	KSA	Ahmed Al Jubaya
66	DF	KSA	Mohammed Al-Khaibari
70	DF	KSA	Mohammed Jahfali

=== Out on loan ===
Note: Flags indicate national team as defined under FIFA eligibility rules; some limited exceptions apply. Players may hold more than one non-FIFA nationality.

No.	Pos.	Nation	Player
30	GK	KSA	Mohammed Al-Waked (at Al-Qadsiah until 30 June 2021)
35	MF	KSA	Mansor Al Beshe (at Al-Raed until 30 June 2021)
38	FW	KSA	Khalid Al Jubaya (at Al-Shoulla until 30 June 2021)
39	MF	KSA	Nawaf Sharahili (at Al-Diriyah until 30 June 2021)

No.	Pos.	Nation	Player
41	MF	KSA	Thaar Al-Otaibi (at Abha until 30 June 2021)
54	DF	KSA	Mohammed Al-Kunaydiri (at Al-Adalah until 30 June 2021)
—	DF	KSA	Mohammed Al-Nasser (at Al-Bukayriyah until 30 June 2021)
—	FW	KSA	Riyadh Al-Ghamdi (at Najran until 30 June 2021)

== Transfers and loans ==
=== Transfers in ===
Entry date	Position	No.	Player	From club	Fee	Ref.
9 September 2020	GK	33	(Saudi Arabia) Abdullah Al-Jadaani	(Saudi Arabia) Al-Wehda	Free	
9 September 2020	DF	32	(Saudi Arabia) Muteb Al-Mufarrij	(Saudi Arabia) Al-Shabab	End of loan	
9 September 2020	FW	11	(Saudi Arabia) Saleh Al-Shehri	(Saudi Arabia) Al-Raed	$2,666,000	
24 September 2020	DF	–	(Saudi Arabia) Mohammed Al-Dossari	(Saudi Arabia) Al-Raed	End of loan	
24 September 2020	MF	15	(Saudi Arabia) Ahmed Ashraf	(Saudi Arabia) Al-Faisaly	End of loan	
24 September 2020	FW	38	(Saudi Arabia) Khaled Al Gubaie	(Saudi Arabia) Al-Shoulla	End of loan	
28 September 2020	MF	41	(Saudi Arabia) Thaar Al-Otaibi	(Saudi Arabia) Al-Taawoun	End of loan	
14 October 2020	MF	26	(Saudi Arabia) Fawaz Al-Torais	(Saudi Arabia) Al-Ettifaq	$1,335,000	
21 October 2020	GK	31	(Saudi Arabia) Habib Al-Wotayan	(Saudi Arabia) Al-Fateh	$1,333,000	
24 October 2020	FW	10	(Argentina) Luciano Vietto	(Portugal) Sporting CP	$8,300,000	
29 October 2020	DF	66	(Saudi Arabia) Mohammed Al-Khaibari	(Saudi Arabia) Al-Shabab	Free	
6 February 2021	FW	14	(Saudi Arabia) Abdullah Al-Hamdan	(Saudi Arabia) Al-Shabab	$800,000	

=== Transfers out ===
Exit date	Position	No.	Player	To club	Fee	Ref.
9 September 2020	MF	3	(Brazil) Carlos Eduardo	(United Arab Emirates) Shabab Al-Ahli	Free	
10 September 2020	MF	10	(Saudi Arabia) Mohammad Al-Shalhoub		Retired	
9 October 2020	DF	–	(Saudi Arabia) Mohammed Al-Dossari	(Saudi Arabia) Al-Raed	Free	
10 October 2020	DF	34	(Saudi Arabia) Waleed Al-Ahmed	(Saudi Arabia) Al-Faisaly	Free	
16 October 2020	DF	17	(Saudi Arabia) Abdullah Al-Hafith	(Saudi Arabia) Al-Wehda	Free	
17 October 2020	MF	–	(Saudi Arabia) Mohammed Mansour	(Saudi Arabia) Al-Jabalain	Free	
25 October 2020	MF	15	(Saudi Arabia) Ahmed Ashraf	(Saudi Arabia) Al-Faisaly	$800,000	
25 October 2020	MF	24	(Saudi Arabia) Nawaf Al-Abed	(Saudi Arabia) Al-Shabab	$1,060,000	
17 January 2021	FW	77	(Ba'athist Syria) Omar Kharbin	(United Arab Emirates) Al-Wahda	Free	
7 February 2021	MF	–	(Saudi Arabia) Salem Al-Saleem	(Saudi Arabia) Al-Diriyah	Free	
8 February 2021	GK	21	(Saudi Arabia) Yazan Jari	(Saudi Arabia) Damac	Free	

=== Loans out ===
Start date	End date	Position	No.	Player	To club	Fee	Ref.
9 October 2020	End of season	FW	38	(Saudi Arabia) Khaled Al Gubaie	(Saudi Arabia) Al-Shoulla	None	
13 October 2020	End of season	MF	41	(Saudi Arabia) Thaar Al-Otaibi	(Saudi Arabia) Abha	None	
19 October 2020	End of season	GK	30	(Saudi Arabia) Mohammed Al-Waked	(Saudi Arabia) Al-Qadsiah	None	
23 October 2020	End of season	MF	39	(Saudi Arabia) Nawaf Sharahili	(Saudi Arabia) Al-Diriyah	None	
26 October 2020	End of season	DF	54	(Saudi Arabia) Mohammed Al-Kunaydiri	(Saudi Arabia) Al-Adalah	None	
12 January 2021	End of season	FW	–	(Saudi Arabia) Riyadh Al-Ghamdi	(Saudi Arabia) Najran	None	
29 January 2021	End of season	MF	35	(Saudi Arabia) Mansor Al-Beshe	(Saudi Arabia) Al-Raed	None	
7 February 2021	End of season	DF	–	(Saudi Arabia) Mohammed Al-Nasser	(Saudi Arabia) Al-Bukayriyah	None	

== Competitions ==
=== Overview ===
Competition	Record							
Competition	G	W	D	L	GF	GA	GD	Win %
Pro League	30	18	7	5	60	27	+33	60.00
King Cup	1	0	0	1	0	2	−2	0.00
Champions League	6	3	1	2	11	9	+2	50.00
Super Cup	1	0	0	1	0	3	−3	0.00
Total	38	21	8	9	71	41	+30	55.26

Updated to match played 30 May 2021
Source: Competitions

=== Pro League ===
==== League table ====
Pos	Team	Pld	W	D	L	GF	GA	GD	Pts	Qualification or relegation
1	Al-Hilal (C)	30	18	7	5	60	27	+33	61	Qualification for AFC Champions League group stage
2	Al-Shabab	30	17	6	7	68	43	+25	57	Qualification for AFC Champions League group stage
3	Al-Ittihad (Note: Al-Ittihad cannot qualify for Asian Football Confederation competitions as they did not obtain an AFC license.)	30	15	11	4	45	29	+16	56	
4	Al-Taawoun	30	13	8	9	42	30	+12	47 (Note: Positions determined by head-to-head points: Al-Taawoun 4 pts; Al-Ettifaq 1 pt.)	Qualification for AFC Champions League play-off round
5	Al-Ettifaq	30	14	5	11	50	48	+2	47	

Source: spl.com source=إحصائيات رابطة دوري المحترفين السعودي 2020-2021
Rules for classification: 1) Points; 2) Head-to-head points; 3) Head-to-head goal difference; 4) Total goal difference; 5) Total goals scored; 6) Fair-play points (Note: Head-to-head record is used only after all the matches between the teams in question have been played).
(C) Champions

==== Results summary ====
Overall								Home						Away					
Pld	W	D	L	GF	GA	GD	Pts	W	D	L	GF	GA	GD	W	D	L	GF	GA	GD
30	18	7	5	60	27	+33	61	10	3	2	30	13	+17	8	4	3	30	14	+16

Last updated: 30 May 2021.
Source: spl.com.sa

==== Results by round ====
Round	1	2	3	4	5	6	7	8	9	10	11	12	13	14	15	16	17	18	19	20	21	22	23	24	25	26	27	28	29	30
Ground	H	A	H	A	H	H	A	H	A	H	H	A	A	H	A	A	H	A	H	A	A	H	A	H	A	A	H	H	A	H
Result	W	D	W	W	W	W	W	L	W	D	D	D	D	W	D	W	L	L	W	L	W	W	W	W	L	W	D	W	W	W
Position	5	7	2	1	1	1	1	1	1	1	1	1	1	1	1	2	3	3	2	2	2	2	1	1	1	1	1	1	1	1

Updated to match(es) played on 30 May 2021. Source: spl.com.sa
A = Away; H = Home; W = Win; D = Draw; L = Loss

==== Matches ====
All times are local, AST (UTC+3).

Win Draw Loss Postponed

17 October 2020 1	Al-Hilal	1–0	Al-Ain	Riyadh
21:15	Al-Bulaihi 49'	Report	Al-Qarni (yellow card) 27'; Nworah (yellow card) 78'	Stadium: Prince Faisal bin Fahd Stadium; Attendance: 0 Referee: Sultan Al-Harbi

22 October 2020 2	Abha	1–1	Al-Hilal	Abha
15:40	Bguir 55' (pen.); Al-Jumeiah (yellow card) 71'	Report	Carrillo 36'; S. Al-Dawsari (yellow card) 74'	Stadium: Prince Sultan bin Abdul Aziz Stadium; Attendance: 0 Referee: Majed Al-Shamrani

31 October 2020 3	Al-Hilal	2–0	Damac	Riyadh
17:50	Gomis 17', 60'; Giovinco (yellow card) 37'; Jahfali (yellow card) 87'; Bahebri (yellow card) 90+4'	Report	Vittor (yellow card) 14'; Harzan (yellow card) 24'; Lema (yellow card) 67'; Chenihi (red card) 80'	Stadium: Prince Faisal bin Fahd Stadium; Attendance: 0 Referee: Turki Al-Khudhayr

6 November 2020 4	Al-Ettifaq	0–2	Al-Hilal	Khobar
17:30		Report	S. Al-Dawsari 25'; Carrillo 63'	Stadium: Prince Saud bin Jalawi Stadium; Attendance: 0 Referee: Khaled Al-Teris

23 November 2020 5	Al-Hilal	2–0	Al-Nassr	Riyadh
20:15	Cuéllar (yellow card) 45+1'; Gomis 60' (pen.); Vietto (yellow card) 63'; Al-Bulaihi (yellow card) 71'; Kanno (yellow card) 90+4'; Al-Breik (yellow card) 90+6'; Al-Shehri 90+8'	Report	Al-Ghanam (yellow card) 29'; Maicon (yellow card) 58'; Al-Obaid (yellow card) 88'; Al-Amri (yellow card) 90+3'	Stadium: King Fahd International Stadium; Attendance: 0 Referee: Mazhar Al-Amur

3 December 2020 6	Al-Hilal	3–0	Al-Fateh	Riyadh
17:40	Kharbin (yellow card) 27', (goal) 31'; S. Al-Dawsari 47'; Kanno 52'; Vietto (yellow card) 71'	Report	Naji (yellow card) 48'; Saâdane (yellow card) 83'	Stadium: King Fahd International Stadium; Attendance: 0 Referee: Mohammed Al-Nuhait

7 December 2020 7	Al-Raed	0–1	Al-Hilal	Buraidah
17:50	Al-Zain (yellow card) 80'; Al-Sahli (yellow card) 90+5'	Report	Al-Bulaihi 84'; Kanno (yellow card) 86'	Stadium: King Abdullah Sport City Stadium; Attendance: 0 Referee: Faisal Al-Blwi

13 December 2020 8	Al-Hilal	1–2	Al-Wehda	Riyadh
19:45	Gomis 70'; Al-Bulaihi (yellow card) 85'	Report	Petratos 7'; Al-Eisa (yellow card) 21'; Bakshween (yellow card) 64'; Abdu Jaber (yellow card) 75', (goal) 90+1'	Stadium: King Fahd International Stadium; Attendance: 0 Referee: Majed Al-Shamrani

21 December 2020 9	Al-Qadsiah	1–3	Al-Hilal	Khobar
17:30	Vitas (yellow card) 25'; Bordeianu (yellow card) 50'; Stanley 57'	Report	Gomis 14' (pen.); Carrillo 23'; S. Al-Dawsari 47'; Al-Olayan (yellow card) 75'	Stadium: Prince Saud bin Jalawi Stadium; Attendance: 0 Referee: Shukri Al-Hanfoush

26 December 2020 10	Al-Hilal	1–1	Al-Ittihad	Riyadh
19:50	Al-Shehri 85'	Report	Al-Aboud 20'; Al-Malki (yellow card) 80'; Al-Bishi (yellow card) 82'; Grohe (yellow card) 90+2'	Stadium: King Fahd International Stadium; Attendance: 0 Referee: Mohammed Al-Hoaish

31 December 2020 11	Al-Hilal	1–1	Al-Shabab	Riyadh
19:50	Al-Faraj (yellow card) 30'; Cuéllar (yellow card) 32'; Al-Shehri 87'	Report	Martins 14'; Al-Ammar (yellow card) 21' (yellow-red card) 51'; Al-Hamdan (yellow card) 35'; Al-Zori (yellow card) 68'; Salem (yellow card) 80'	Stadium: King Fahd International Stadium; Attendance: 0 Referee: Khaled Al-Teris

8 January 2021 12	Al-Batin	2–2	Al-Hilal	Hafar al-Batin
15:20	Chaves (yellow card) 26', (goal) 61'; El Jebli 35'; Al-Qarni (yellow card) 82'	Report	Al-Mufarrij (yellow card) 18'; Kanno 25', (yellow card) 39'; Gomis 43'; Bahebri (yellow card) 90+7'	Stadium: Al-Batin Club Stadium; Attendance: 0 Referee: Ahmad Al-Rumaikhani

15 January 2021 13	Al-Ahli	0–0	Al-Hilal	Jeddah
20:10	Fejsa (yellow card) 5'; Al-Asmari (yellow card) 45+2'	Report	Carrillo (yellow card) 40'; Vietto (yellow card) 68'	Stadium: King Abdullah Sports City; Attendance: 0 Referee: Majed Al-Shamrani

20 January 2021 14	Al-Hilal	2–0	Al-Taawoun	Riyadh
18:10	Gomis 2'; Al-Shahrani (yellow card) 21'; Vietto (yellow card) 35', (goal) 50'; Giovinco (yellow card) 64'; Al-Breik (yellow card) 65'	Report	Amissi (yellow card) 7'; Santos (yellow card) 39'; Abousaban (yellow card) 66'	Stadium: Prince Faisal bin Fahd Stadium; Attendance: 0 Referee: Faisal Al-Blwi

25 January 2021 15	Al-Faisaly	1–1	Al-Hilal	Al Majma'ah
18:15	Guilherme (yellow card) 45+2'; Tavares 83' (pen.); Malayekah (yellow card) 88'	Report	Gomis 20'; Giovinco (yellow card) 39'; Al-Shahrani (yellow card) 82'	Stadium: Al Majma'ah Sports City; Attendance: 0 Referee: Raed Al-Zahrani

4 February 2021 17	Al-Hilal	2–3	Abha	Riyadh
18:15	Jahfali (yellow card) 10'; Al-Shehri 13'; Carrillo 67'	Report	Sharahili 11'; Tahrat 75'; Amr (yellow card) 86'; Bguir 90+7', (yellow card) 90+8'	Stadium: Prince Faisal bin Fahd Stadium; Attendance: 0 Referee: Ilgiz Tantashev (Uzbekistan)

9 February 2021 16	Al-Ain	0–5	Al-Hilal	Al Bahah
16:05	Juanpi (yellow card) 19'; Al-Qarni (yellow card) 25'	Report	Gomis 9' (pen.), 45+5' (pen.), 57' (pen.), 78', (yellow card) 42'; S. Al-Dawsari (yellow card) 71', (goal) 90+4'; Carrillo (yellow card) 75'	Stadium: King Saud Sport City Stadium; Attendance: 0 Referee: Abdullah Al-Harbi

14 February 2021 18	Damac	1–0	Al-Hilal	Abha
16:05	Zelaya (yellow card) 12'; Chafaï 45'; Al-Najej (yellow card) 75'; Majrashi (yellow card) 90'; Zeghba (yellow card) 90+8'	Report	N. Al-Dawsari (yellow card) 90'	Stadium: Prince Sultan bin Abdul Aziz Stadium; Attendance: 0 Referee: Khaled Al Teris

18 February 2021 19	Al-Hilal	3–1	Al-Ettifaq	Riyadh
20:20	Gomis 58', 80'; N. Al-Dawsari (yellow card) 71'; Carrillo 73'	Report	Kiss 90+7' (pen.)	Stadium: Prince Faisal bin Fahd Stadium; Attendance: 0 Referee: Maguette Ndiaye (Senegal)

23 February 2021 20	Al-Nassr	1–0	Al-Hilal	Riyadh
20:35	Martínez 21', (yellow card) 62'; Amrabat (yellow card) 40'; Petros (yellow card) 66'; Jones (yellow card) 85'; Yahya (yellow card) 90+1'	Report	N. Al-Dawsari (yellow card) 32'; Cuéllar (yellow card) 40'; Gomis (yellow card) 65'; Al-Shahrani (yellow card) 73'; S. Al-Dawsari (yellow card) 77'; Al-Bulaihi (yellow card) 88'	Stadium: Mrsool Park; Attendance: 0 Referee: Esteban Ostojich (Uruguay)

28 February 2021 21	Al-Fateh	2–5	Al-Hilal	Al-Hasa
18:20	Soudani (yellow card) 45+2'; Al-Daheem 66', (yellow card) 90+3'; Cueva 81' (pen.); Boushal (yellow card) 82'	Report	Carrillo 23'; Gomis 26'; Vietto 40'; N. Al-Dawsari (yellow card) 45+4'; S. Al-Dawsari 72', 84'	Stadium: Prince Abdullah bin Jalawi Stadium; Attendance: 0 Referee: Khaled Salwi

5 March 2021 22	Al-Hilal	2–1	Al-Raed	Riyadh
20:35	Al-Bulaihi (yellow card) 13' (yellow-red card) 64'; Al-Shahrani 56'; Jang Hyun-soo (yellow card) 67'; Doukha 90+3' (o.g.)	Report	Al-Dossari (yellow card) 42'; El Berkaoui 69' (pen.)	Stadium: Prince Faisal bin Fahd Stadium; Attendance: 0 Referee: Ovidiu Hațegan (Romania)

11 March 2021 23	Al-Wehda	2–4	Al-Hilal	Mecca
19:05	Niakaté 15', 40' (pen.), (yellow card) 85'	Report	Gomis 35' (pen.), 55', 75'; Vietto 36', (yellow card) 74'	Stadium: King Abdul Aziz Stadium; Attendance: 0 Referee: Turki Al-Khudhayr

20 March 2021 24	Al-Hilal	1–0	Al-Qadsiah	Riyadh
20:45	Carrillo 51'	Report	Al-Dawsari (yellow card) 75'; Al-Nattar (yellow card) 87'	Stadium: Prince Faisal bin Fahd Stadium; Attendance: 0 Referee: Janny Sikazwe (Zambia)

9 April 2021 25	Al-Ittihad	2–0	Al-Hilal	Mecca
20:50	Fallatah 26'; Abdulhamid 45'; Grohe (yellow card) 80'	Report	Kurdi (yellow card) 77'	Stadium: King Abdul Aziz Stadium; Attendance: 0 Referee: Rédouane Jiyed (Morocco)

17 April 2021 26	Al-Shabab	1–5	Al-Hilal	Riyadh
21:45	Martins 5'; Banega (yellow card) 18' (yellow-red card) 45+1'; Tambakti (yellow card) 24'; Salem (yellow card) 45+1'; Guanca (yellow card) 70'; N'Diaye (yellow card) 74'	Report	Gomis 3', 25' (pen.); Vietto 45+3'; N. Al-Dawsari 66', (yellow card) 90'; Kanno 84'; Al-Shehri (yellow card) 90'	Stadium: Prince Khalid bin Sultan Stadium; Attendance: 0 Referee: István Kovács (Romania)

14 May 2021 27	Al-Hilal	1–1	Al-Batin	Riyadh
21:00	Gomis 19'; N. Al-Dawsari (yellow card) 61'	Report	Rayhi 29'; Al-Owdah (yellow card) 81'	Stadium: Prince Faisal bin Fahd Stadium; Attendance: 0 Referee: Mustapha Ghorbal (Algeria)

19 May 2021 28	Al-Hilal	5–1	Al-Ahli	Riyadh
21:00	S. Al-Dawsari 15'; Gomis 32', 42' (pen.); Jahfali (yellow card) 44'; Al-Shehri 65' (pen.), 90+2'; Carrillo (yellow card) 81'	Report	Hawsawi (red card) 39'; Al-Owais (yellow card) 64'; Ghareeb 66'; Al-Ali (yellow card) 83'	Stadium: Prince Faisal bin Fahd Stadium; Referee: Szymon Marciniak (Poland)

23 May 2021 29	Al-Taawoun	0–1	Al-Hilal	Buraidah
21:00	Al-Mousa (yellow card) 19'; Al-Nabit (yellow card) 31'; Santos (yellow card) 53'; Abousaban (yellow card) 57'; Al-Sobhi (yellow card) 70'; Al-Zubaidi (yellow card) 73'; Al-Sahlawi (yellow card) 89'	Report	Gomis 5', (yellow card) 66'; Al-Faraj (yellow card) 68'; Cuéllar (yellow card) 86'; Al-Mayouf (yellow card) 90+2'	Stadium: King Abdullah Sport City Stadium; Attendance: 5,760; Referee: Faisal Al-Blwi

30 May 2021 30	Al-Hilal	3–2	Al-Faisaly	Riyadh
21:00	Giovinco (yellow card) 15', (goal) 27'; Jang Hyun-soo (yellow card) 33'; S. Al-Dawsari 59' (pen.); Al-Hamdan 69', (yellow card) 84'	Report	Guilherme 29'; Merkel (yellow card) 63'; Tavares 90+4' (pen.)	Stadium: King Fahd International Stadium; Attendance: 15,245; Referee: Khaled Salwi

=== King Cup ===
All times are local, AST (UTC+3).

17 December 2020 Round of 16	Al-Hilal	0–2	Al-Fateh	Riyadh
17:40	Jahfali (yellow card) 1'; Cuéllar (yellow card) 90+4'	Report	Al-Habib (yellow card) 43'; Batna 55'; Saâdane (yellow card) 84'; Al-Fuhaid (yellow card) 87'; Bendebka 88'; Al-Daheem (yellow card) 90+3'	Stadium: Prince Faisal bin Fahd Stadium; Attendance: 0 Referee: Turki Al-Khudhayr

=== Saudi Super Cup ===
All times are local, AST (UTC+3).

30 January 2021 Final	Al-Hilal	0–3	Al-Nassr	Riyadh
20:15	Al-Dawsari (yellow card) 64'; Vietto (yellow card) 67'	Report	Petros (yellow card) 52', (goal) 61'; Al-Ghannam (yellow card) 64'; Amrabat (yellow card) 75'; Hamdallah 82', (yellow card) 84'; Al-Najei 90+2', (yellow card) 90+3'	Stadium: King Fahd International Stadium; Attendance: 0 Referee: Daniele Orsato (Italy)

=== AFC Champions League ===
==== Group stage ====
Pos	Team	Pld	W	D	L	GF	GA	GD	Pts	Qualification	IST	HIL	SAH	AGK
1	(Tajikistan) Istiklol	6	3	1	2	10	8	+2	10 (Note: Head-to-head goal difference: Istiklol 1, Al Hilal −1.)	Advance to Round of 16	—	4–1	0–0	1–2
2	(Saudi Arabia) Al-Hilal (H)	6	3	1	2	11	9	+2	10	Advance to Round of 16	3–1	—	0–2	2–2
3	(United Arab Emirates) Shabab Al-Ahli	6	2	1	3	6	6	0	7 (Note: Head-to-head goal difference: Shabab Al-Ahli 1, AGMK −1.)		0–1	0–2	—	3–1
4	(Uzbekistan) AGMK	6	2	1	3	9	13	−4	7		2–3	0–3	2–1	—

Source: AFC
Rules for classification: Tiebreakers
(H) Hosts
Notes:

15 April 2021 1	Al-Hilal (Saudi Arabia)	2–2	(Uzbekistan) AGMK	Riyadh, Saudi Arabia
22:00 UTC+3	Rakhmanov 27' (o.g.); Vietto 36'	Report	Polvonov 11'; Shaakhmedov 70', (yellow card) 90+4'	Stadium: Prince Faisal bin Fahd Stadium; Attendance: 0 Referee: Ryuji Sato (Japan)

18 April 2021 2	Shabab Al-Ahli (United Arab Emirates)	0–2	(Saudi Arabia) Al-Hilal	Riyadh, Saudi Arabia
22:00 UTC+3	Naser (yellow card) 29'; Al Ghassani (yellow card) 35'; Sanqour (yellow card) 54'; Hassan (yellow card) 90+4'	Report	Gomis 14'; Carrillo 28'; Bahebri (yellow card) 57'; Al-Mayouf (yellow card) 80'	Stadium: Prince Faisal bin Fahd Stadium; Attendance: 0 Referee: Mohanad Qasim (Iraq)

21 April 2021 3	Al-Hilal (Saudi Arabia)	3–1	(Tajikistan) Istiklol	Riyadh, Saudi Arabia
22:00 UTC+3	Al Bulaihi 39'; Bahebri 52', 64'	Report	Davronov (yellow card) 4'; Hanonov 39'	Stadium: Prince Faisal bin Fahd Stadium; Attendance: 0 Referee: Masoud Tufayelieh (Syria)

24 April 2021 4	Istiklol (Tajikistan)	4–1	(Saudi Arabia) Al-Hilal	Riyadh, Saudi Arabia
22:00 UTC+3	Dzhalilov 39', 44'; Safarov 49', 53'; Juraboev (yellow card) 90'	Report	Gomis 24'	Stadium: Prince Faisal bin Fahd Stadium; Attendance: 0 Referee: Omar Al-Yaqoubi (Oman)

27 April 2021 5	AGMK (Uzbekistan)	0–3	(Saudi Arabia) Al-Hilal	Riyadh, Saudi Arabia
22:00 UTC+3	Kasyan (yellow card) 43'	Report	Vietto 39'; Gomis 47'; Kanno (yellow card) 56'; Al-Shahrani 58'	Stadium: Prince Faisal bin Fahd Stadium; Attendance: 0 Referee: Hettikamkanamge Perera (Sri Lanka)

30 April 2021 6	Al-Hilal (Saudi Arabia)	0–2	(United Arab Emirates) Shabab Al-Ahli	Riyadh, Saudi Arabia
22:00 UTC+3	Kanno (yellow card) 52'	Report	Jesus 54' (pen.), 90'; Al-Naqbi (yellow card) 59'; Khamis (yellow card) 62'; Jumaa (yellow card) 81'; Eduardo (yellow card) 88'; Hamza (yellow card) 90+6'	Stadium: Prince Faisal bin Fahd Stadium; Attendance: 0 Referee: Ali Abdulnabi (Bahrain)

== Statistics ==
=== Appearances ===
Last updated on 30 May 2021.

No.	Pos	Nat	Player	Total		Pro League		King Cup		Champions League		Super Cup	
No.	Pos	Nat	Player	Apps	Goals	Apps	Goals	Apps	Goals	Apps	Goals	Apps	Goals
Goalkeepers
1	GK	(Saudi Arabia) KSA	Abdullah Al-Mayouf	26	0	19	0	0	0	6	0	1	0
31	GK	(Saudi Arabia) KSA	Habib Al-Wotayan	8	0	8	0	0	0	0	0	0	0
33	GK	(Saudi Arabia) KSA	Abdullah Al-Jadaani	4	0	3	0	1	0	0	0	0	0
50	GK	(Saudi Arabia) KSA	Abdullah Al-Bishi	0	0	0	0	0	0	0	0	0	0
Defenders
2	DF	(Saudi Arabia) KSA	Mohammed Al-Breik	34	0	25+1	0	0+1	0	6	0	1	0
5	DF	(Saudi Arabia) KSA	Ali Al Bulaihi	22	3	16	2	0	0	6	1	0	0
12	DF	(Saudi Arabia) KSA	Yasser Al-Shahrani	35	2	26+1	1	1	0	6	1	1	0
20	DF	(South Korea) KOR	Jang Hyun-soo	33	0	24+1	0	1	0	6	0	1	0
22	DF	(Saudi Arabia) KSA	Amiri Kurdi	13	0	4+5	0	0	0	0+4	0	0	0
23	DF	(Saudi Arabia) KSA	Madallah Al-Olayan	10	0	6+2	0	1	0	0+1	0	0	0
32	DF	(Saudi Arabia) KSA	Muteb Al-Mufarrij	8	0	5+3	0	0	0	0	0	0	0
46	DF	(Saudi Arabia) KSA	Abdulrahman Al-Dakheel	0	0	0	0	0	0	0	0	0	0
66	DF	(Saudi Arabia) KSA	Mohammed Al-Khaibari	0	0	0	0	0	0	0	0	0	0
70	DF	(Saudi Arabia) KSA	Mohammed Jahfali	18	0	13+2	0	1	0	0+1	0	1	0
Midfielders
6	MF	(Colombia) COL	Gustavo Cuéllar	27	0	23+2	0	1	0	0	0	1	0
7	MF	(Saudi Arabia) KSA	Salman Al-Faraj	19	0	14+3	0	1	0	0	0	1	0
8	MF	(Saudi Arabia) KSA	Abdullah Otayf	23	0	7+10	0	0	0	6	0	0	0
16	MF	(Saudi Arabia) KSA	Nasser Al-Dawsari	22	1	6+10	1	0	0	2+3	0	0+1	0
19	MF	(Peru) PER	André Carrillo	37	8	24+5	7	1	0	6	1	0+1	0
26	MF	(Saudi Arabia) KSA	Fawaz Al-Torais	8	0	0+4	0	0	0	0+4	0	0	0
27	MF	(Saudi Arabia) KSA	Hattan Bahebri	18	2	2+10	0	0	0	4+2	2	0	0
28	MF	(Saudi Arabia) KSA	Mohamed Kanno	30	3	11+11	3	1	0	6	0	0+1	0
29	MF	(Saudi Arabia) KSA	Salem Al-Dawsari	28	8	20+4	8	0+1	0	0+2	0	1	0
43	MF	(Saudi Arabia) KSA	Musab Al-Juwayr	0	0	0	0	0	0	0	0	0	0
44	MF	(Saudi Arabia) KSA	Saad Al-Nasser	1	0	0	0	0	0	0+1	0	0	0
55	MF	(Saudi Arabia) KSA	Hamad Al-Abdan	3	0	0+3	0	0	0	0	0	0	0
Forwards
9	FW	(Italy) ITA	Sebastian Giovinco	22	1	16+5	1	0	0	0	0	1	0
10	FW	(Argentina) ARG	Luciano Vietto	35	6	21+6	4	1	0	6	2	1	0
11	FW	(Saudi Arabia) KSA	Saleh Al-Shehri	31	6	2+22	6	1	0	0+5	0	0+1	0
14	FW	(Saudi Arabia) KSA	Abdullah Al-Hamdan	9	1	1+7	1	0	0	0+1	0	0	0
18	FW	(France) FRA	Bafétimbi Gomis	38	27	28+2	24	0+1	0	6	3	1	0
49	FW	(Saudi Arabia) KSA	Abdullah Rudaif	0	0	0	0	0	0	0	0	0	0
Players sent out on loan this season
35	MF	(Saudi Arabia) KSA	Mansor Al-Beshe	0	0	0	0	0	0	0	0	0	0
Player who made an appearance this season but have left the club
15	MF	(Saudi Arabia) KSA	Ahmed Ashraf	2	0	2	0	0	0	0	0	0	0
17	DF	(Saudi Arabia) KSA	Abdullah Al-Hafith	0	0	0	0	0	0	0	0	0	0
77	FW	(Ba'athist Syria) [[|Syria]]	Omar Kharbin	9	1	4+4	1	0+1	0	0	0	0	0

=== Goalscorers ===
Rank	No.	Pos	Nat	Name	Pro League	King Cup	Champions League	Super Cup	Total
1	18	FW	(France)	Bafétimbi Gomis	24	0	3	0	27
2	19	MF	(Peru)	André Carrillo	7	0	1	0	8
2	29	MF	(Saudi Arabia)	Salem Al-Dawsari	8	0	0	0	8
4	10	FW	(Argentina)	Luciano Vietto	4	0	2	0	6
4	11	FW	(Saudi Arabia)	Saleh Al-Shehri	6	0	0	0	6
6	5	DF	(Saudi Arabia)	Ali Al-Bulaihi	2	0	1	0	3
6	28	MF	(Saudi Arabia)	Mohamed Kanno	3	0	0	0	3
8	12	DF	(Saudi Arabia)	Yasser Al-Shahrani	1	0	1	0	2
8	27	MF	(Saudi Arabia)	Hattan Bahebri	0	0	2	0	2
10	9	FW	(Italy)	Sebastian Giovinco	1	0	0	0	1
10	14	FW	(Saudi Arabia)	Abdullah Al-Hamdan	1	0	0	0	1
10	16	MF	(Saudi Arabia)	Nasser Al-Dawsari	1	0	0	0	1
10	77	FW	(Syria)	Omar Kharbin	1	0	0	0	1
Own goal					1	0	1	0	2
Total					60	0	11	0	71

Last Updated: 30 May 2021

=== Assists ===
Rank	No.	Pos	Nat	Name	Pro League	King Cup	Champions League	Super Cup	Total
1	2	DF	(Saudi Arabia)	Mohammed Al-Breik	2	0	4	0	6
1	19	MF	(Peru)	André Carrillo	6	0	0	0	6
3	9	FW	(Italy)	Sebastian Giovinco	4	0	0	0	4
3	10	FW	(Argentina)	Luciano Vietto	3	0	1	0	4
3	18	FW	(France)	Bafétimbi Gomis	4	0	0	0	4
6	12	DF	(Saudi Arabia)	Yasser Al-Shahrani	3	0	0	0	3
6	29	MF	(Saudi Arabia)	Salem Al-Dawsari	3	0	0	0	3
8	8	MF	(Saudi Arabia)	Abdullah Otayf	2	0	0	0	2
8	27	MF	(Saudi Arabia)	Hattan Bahebri	1	0	1	0	2
8	28	MF	(Saudi Arabia)	Mohamed Kanno	0	0	2	0	2
11	22	DF	(Saudi Arabia)	Amiri Kurdi	1	0	0	0	1
Total					29	0	8	0	37

Last Updated: 30 May 2021

=== Clean sheets ===
Rank	No.	Pos	Nat	Name	Pro League	King Cup	Champions League	Super Cup	Total
1	1	GK	(Saudi Arabia)	Abdullah Al-Mayouf	7	0	2	0	9
2	31	GK	(Saudi Arabia)	Habib Al-Wotayan	2	0	0	0	2
2	33	GK	(Saudi Arabia)	Abdullah Al-Jadaani	2	0	0	0	2
Total					11	0	2	0	13

Last Updated: 23 May 2021
