= Mohamed Nagy =

Mohamed Nagy or variations may refer to:

- Mohammad Naji (born 1993), Saudi Arabian footballer
- Mohamed Nagy (artist) (1888–1956), Egyptian artist
- Mohamed Nagy Ismail Afash (born 1984), Egyptian footballer better known as "Gedo"
- Mohamed Nagy (footballer, born 1996), Egyptian footballer
- Mohammed Naji (born 1965), Iraqi politician
