= André Carrillo =

Peruvian footballer (born 1991)

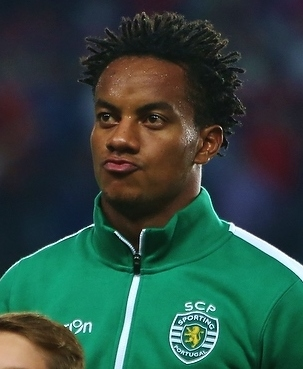
- Carrillo with Sporting CP in 2015

Personal information
- Full name: André Martín Carrillo Díaz
- Date of birth: 14 June 1991 (age 35)
- Place of birth: Lima, Peru
- Height: 1.82 m (6 ft 0 in)
- Position: Attacking midfielder

Team information
- Current team: Corinthians
- Number: 19

Youth career
- 2004–2007: Esther Grande
- 2007–2009: Alianza Lima

Senior career*
Years	Team	Apps	(Gls)
2009–2011	Alianza Lima	21	(3)
2011–2016	Sporting CP	110	(11)
2016–2019	Benfica	20	(2)
2017–2018	→ Watford (loan)	28	(1)
2018–2019	→ Al-Hilal (loan)	21	(3)
2019–2023	Al-Hilal	108	(16)
2023–2024	Al-Qadsiah	29	(2)
2024–	Corinthians	75	(1)

International career^{‡}
2011–	Peru	109	(11)
Medal record
Men's football
Representing Peru
Copa América
Runner-up	2019 Brazil
Third place	2011 Argentina
Third place	2015 Chile
- * Club domestic league appearances and goals as of 18 November 2026 (UTC) ‡ National team caps and goals as of 12:38, 5 November 2026 (UTC)

André Martín Carrillo Díaz (born 14 June 1991) is a Peruvian professional footballer who plays as an attacking midfielder for Campeonato Brasileiro Série A club Corinthians and the Peru national team. He is nicknamed La Culebra (The Snake).

Carrillo began his senior career in 2009 with Alianza Lima. Two years later, he moved to Sporting CP in Portugal and debuted for his country. In 2016, he joined crosstown rivals Benfica and went on winning the league, cup and super cup in his first season. He was then loaned out for two consecutive seasons, the first to English club Watford in the Premier League, and the second to Al-Hilal in the Saudi Pro League, joined the latter club permanently in mid-2019. With Al-Hilal, he won 3 league titles, two King Cups, two Saudi Super Cups, and two AFC Champions League titles. In mid-2023, he joined Al-Qadsiah, achieving a promotion to the top tier at the end of the season. In the mid-2024, following his departure from Al-Qadsiah, he signed for Brazilian side, Corinthians.

At international level, Carrillo has earned over 100 caps for Peru since making his debut in 2011, and has represented his nation at five editions of the Copa América (finishing third in 2011 and 2015, and second in 2019) and the 2018 FIFA World Cup.

== Club career ==
=== Alianza Lima ===
Carrillo began his football career in the Lima-based youth system of Esther Grande de Bentín, in 2004. Then in 2007 he joined Alianza Lima's youth setup. Finally in 2009, he was moved up to Alianza Lima's first team and made his league debut in the Torneo Descentralizado on 5 December in the last round of the regular season. Playing at home in the Matute Stadium, he entered the pitch in the 75th minute as match eventually finished in 2–2 draw against Universidad César Vallejo.

=== Sporting CP ===
On 6 May 2011, it was reported that Carrillo signed a five-year contract with Sporting CP. He was quickly included in the first team and was an unused substitute for the league games in round 2 and 3. Then in matchday 5 and playing from the start, he made his Primeira Liga debut on 19 September 2011 in Sporting's 3–2 away win over Rio Ave FC. He was in the starting line-up again in his second match and provided his first assist in his side's 3–0 win over Vitória Setúbal. Later he provided two assists in Sporting's 6–1 victory over Gil Vicente. Then in his eleventh match, he scored his first league goal in the 74th minute, but it was not enough to avoid a 2–1 away defeat to Braga.

On 2 February 2016, Sporting informed that Carrillo had signed a contract with city rivals Benfica until 2021.

In September 2020, it was revealed that 50% of Carrillo's economic rights at Sporting were owned by a third party based in the British Virgin Islands, set up by Russian billionaire Roman Abramovich. The revelation caused controversy as Carrillo had played against Abramovich's Chelsea in 2014 without this being declared.

=== Benfica ===
Carrillo officially joined Portuguese defending champions Benfica on 1 July for the 2016–17 season. He was an unused substitute as the team won the 2016 Supertaça Cândido de Oliveira 3–0 against Braga on 7 August. He played 20 games and scored twice as they won the league; the team also won the Taça de Portugal and he netted against Estoril in the semi-finals. He started only three league games as manager Rui Vitória preferred Eduardo Salvio and Franco Cervi; this was one start fewer than in his final season at Sporting.

On 24 August 2017, Carrillo joined English side Watford on a season-long loan with the option for a permanent transfer. He was signed by his former Sporting manager Marco Silva. He made his debut two days later in a goalless draw away to Brighton & Hove Albion, coming on two minutes into the second half as a substitute for injured defender Craig Cathcart. He played 30 total games for the team from Vicarage Road, scoring the opener in a 2–1 home loss to Swansea City in the Premier League on 30 December, and in a 3–0 win over Bristol City in the FA Cup third round a week later.

=== Al Hilal ===
For the 2018–19 season, Carrillo was loaned again, this time to Al-Hilal FC in Saudi Arabia. On 23 July 2019, Carrillo signed a four-year contract with the club.

In the opening leg of the 2019 AFC Champions League Final on 9 November, he scored the only goal in a 1–0 home win over Urawa Red Diamonds; Al-Hilal went on to win the title following a 3–0 aggregate victory, which allowed them to qualify for the 2019 FIFA Club World Cup.

=== Al-Qadsiah ===
On 13 August 2023, Carrillo joined Saudi First Division League club Al-Qadsiah.

=== Corinthians ===
On 10 September 2024, Corinthians announced that Carrillo has officially joined the club. With this move, he became the third Peruvian player in the club's history, following Luis Ramírez and Paolo Guerrero.

== International career ==
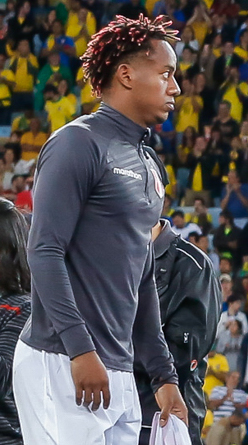
Carillo after the 2019 Copa América Final

In March 2011, Carrillo was called up by manager Sergio Markarián for two friendly matches in Europe; In May that year he was called up to play in the Kirin Cup. At the 2011 Copa América in Argentina, he made his debut in the final group match against rivals Chile, coming on in the 76th minute for Antonio Gonzales and scoring the only goal as an own goal in added time.

On 15 August 2012, Carrillo scored his first international goal, the only one of a friendly win away to Costa Rica. His second on 3 July 2015 was in a 2–0 victory against Paraguay in the 2015 Copa América Third Place Match.

Carrillo was absent from the national team for over a year until his return in October 2016, having been sidelined due to a lack of playing time at his club. He started all three games of a group-stage elimination at the 2018 FIFA World Cup in Russia; his goal in a 2–0 win over Australia in the last match was Peru's first at the World Cup in 36 years.

Carrillo was part of the Peru team that came runners-up to Brazil in the 2019 Copa América; he played the first 71 minutes of the 3–1 loss to the host team. On 8 October the following year, he scored twice in a 2–2 draw away to Paraguay, at the start of an unsuccessful campaign to qualify for the 2022 FIFA World Cup.

At the 2021 Copa América in Brazil, Carrillo scored decisive goals in group games against Ecuador (draw) and Venezuela (win). In the quarter-finals, he assisted a goal by Gianluca Lapadula but was later sent off, as his team required a penalty shootout to advance past Paraguay.

On 15 June 2024, he was selected in the 26-man squad for the 2024 Copa América. On 25 June, he earned his 100th international cap in a 1–0 defeat against Canada in the second group stage match of the tournament.

== Career statistics ==
=== Club ===
As of match played 18 November 2026

Appearances and goals by club, season and competition
Club	Season	League			State league (Note: Includes Campeonato Paulista)		National cup (Note: Includes Taça de Portugal, FA Cup, King's Cup, Copa do Brasil)		League cup (Note: Includes Taça da Liga)		Continental		Other		Total	
Club	Season	Division	Apps	Goals	Apps	Goals	Apps	Goals	Apps	Goals	Apps	Goals	Apps	Goals	Apps	Goals
Alianza Lima	2009	Descentralizado	1	0	—		—		—		—		—		1	0
Alianza Lima	2010	Descentralizado	11	0	—		—		—		0	0	—		11	0
Alianza Lima	2011	Descentralizado	9	3	—		0	0	—		0	0	—		9	3
Alianza Lima	Total		21	3	0	0	0	0	0	0	0	0	0	0	21	3
Sporting CP	2011–12	Primeira Liga	24	2	—		6	1	3	0	13 (Note: Appearances in UEFA Europa League)	0	—		46	3
Sporting CP	2012–13	Primeira Liga	23	1	—		0	0	3	0	5	2	—		31	3
Sporting CP	2013–14	Primeira Liga	27	2	—		2	0	3	0	—		—		32	2
Sporting CP	2014–15	Primeira Liga	32	5	—		6	2	0	0	8 (Note: Six appearances in UEFA Champions League, two appearances in UEFA Europa League)	0	—		46	7
Sporting CP	2015–16	Primeira Liga	4	1	—		0	0	0	0	2 (Note: Appearances in UEFA Champions League)	0	1 (Note: Appearance in Supertaça Cândido de Oliveira)	1	7	2
Sporting CP	Total		110	11	0	0	14	3	9	0	28	2	1	1	162	17
Benfica	2016–17	Primeira Liga	20	2	—		6	1	3	0	3	0	0	0	32	3
Watford (loan)	2017–18	Premier League	28	1	—		2	1	0	0	—		—		30	2
Al Hilal (loan)	2018–19	Saudi Pro League	21	3	—		2	1	—		—		3 (Note: One appearance in Saudi Super Cup, two appearances in Arab Club Champions Cup)	0	26	4
Al Hilal	2019–20	Saudi Pro League	27	4	—		2	0	—		8 (Note: Appearances in AFC Champions League)	3	2 (Note: Appearances in FIFA Club World Cup)	0	39	7
Al Hilal	2020–21	Saudi Pro League	29	7	—		1	0	—		5	1	1 (Note: Appearance in Saudi Super Cup)	0	37	8
Al Hilal	2021–22	Saudi Pro League	22	4	—		2	1	—		6	1	4 (Note: One appearance in Saudi Super Cup, three appearances and one goal in FIFA Club World Cup)	1	34	7
Al Hilal	2022–23	Saudi Pro League	30	1	—		4	0	—		1	0	4 (Note: One appearance in Saudi Super Cup, three appearances in FIFA Club World Cup)	0	37	1
Al Hilal	2023–24	Saudi Pro League	—		—		—		—		—		5 (Note: Appearances in Arab Club Champions Cup)	0	5	0
Al Hilal	Total		108	16	0	0	9	1	0	0	20	5	16	1	153	22
Al-Qadsiah	2023–24	Saudi First Division League	28	2	—		0	0	—		—		—		28	2
Al-Qadsiah	2024–25	Saudi Pro League	1	0	—		—		—		—		—		1	0
Al-Qadsiah	Total		29	2	0	0	0	0	0	0	0	0	0	0	29	2
Corinthians	2024	Série A	13	0	—		2	0	—		4 (Note: Appearances in Copa Sudamericana)	0	—		19	0
Corinthians	2025	Série A	22	1	12	0	8	0	—		10 (Note: Four appearances and two goals in Copa Libertadores, five appearances in Copa Sudamericana)	2	—		52	3
Corinthians	2026	Série A	25	0	5	0	2	0	—		9 (Note: Appearances in Copa Libertadores)	0	1 (Note: Appearance in Supercopa do Brasil)	0	42	0
Corinthians	Total		60	1	17	0	12	0	0	0	23	2	1	0	113	3
Career total			397	39	17	0	45	7	12	0	74	9	21	2	566	56

=== International ===
As of match played 6 October 2026

Appearances and goals by national team and year
National team	Year	Apps	Goals
Peru	2011	1	0
Peru	2012	7	1
Peru	2013	6	0
Peru	2014	8	0
Peru	2015	9	1
Peru	2016	2	0
Peru	2017	8	1
Peru	2018	13	3
Peru	2019	12	0
Peru	2020	4	3
Peru	2021	13	2
Peru	2022	7	0
Peru	2023	7	0
Peru	2024	3	0
Peru	2025	3	0
Peru	2026	6	0
Total		109	11

Scores and results list Peru's goal tally first, score column indicates score after each Carrillo goal.

List of international goals scored by André Carrillo
No.	Date	Venue	Opponent	Score	Result	Competition
1	15 August 2012	Estadio Nacional de Costa Rica, San José, Costa Rica	Costa Rica	1–0	1–0	Friendly
2	3 July 2015	Estadio Ester Roa, Concepción, Chile	Paraguay	1–0	2–0	2015 Copa América
3	23 March 2017	Estadio Monumental de Maturín, Maturín, Venezuela	Venezuela	1–2	2–2	2018 FIFA World Cup qualification
4	23 March 2018	Hard Rock Stadium, Miami, United States	Croatia	1–0	2–0	Friendly
5	3 June 2018	kybunpark, St. Gallen, Switzerland	Saudi Arabia	1–0	3–0	Friendly
6	26 June 2018	Fisht Olympic Stadium, Sochi, Russia	Australia	1–0	2–0	2018 FIFA World Cup
7	8 October 2020	Estadio Defensores del Chaco, Asunción, Paraguay	Paraguay	1–0	2–2	2022 FIFA World Cup qualification
8	8 October 2020	Estadio Defensores del Chaco, Asunción, Paraguay	Paraguay	2–2	2–2	2022 FIFA World Cup qualification
9	13 October 2020	Estadio Nacional, Lima, Peru	Brazil	1–0	2–4	2022 FIFA World Cup qualification
10	23 June 2021	Estádio Olímpico Pedro Ludovico, Goiânia, Brazil	Ecuador	2–2	2–2	2021 Copa América
11	27 June 2021	Estádio Nacional Mané Garrincha, Brasília, Brazil	Venezuela	1–0	1–0	2021 Copa América

== Honours ==
Sporting CP

- Taça de Portugal: 2014–15
- Supertaça Cândido de Oliveira: 2015

Benfica

- Primeira Liga: 2016–17
- Taça de Portugal: 2016–17
- Supertaça Cândido de Oliveira: 2016

Al-Hilal

- Saudi Pro League: 2019–20, 2020–21, 2021–22
- King's Cup: 2019–20, 2022–23
- Saudi Super Cup: 2018, 2021
- AFC Champions League: 2019, 2021

Al-Qadsiah

- Saudi First Division League: 2023–24

Corinthians

- Copa do Brasil: 2025
- Campeonato Paulista: 2025
- Supercopa do Brasil: 2026

Peru

- Copa América runner-up: 2019; third place: 2011, 2015

Individual

- Torneo Descentralizado Breakthrough Player: 2010

== See also ==
- List of men's footballers with 100 or more international caps
