= Mohammed Al-Saeed =

Saudi Arabian footballer

Personal information
- Full name: Mohammed Khalifah Al-Saeed
- Date of birth: November 14, 1996 (age 29)
- Place of birth: Saudi Arabia
- Height: 1.72 m (5 ft 8 in)
- Positions: Winger; left back

Team information
- Current team: Al-Adalah (on loan from Al-Riyadh)
- Number: 81

Youth career
- Al-Adalah

Senior career*
Years	Team	Apps	(Gls)
2014–2016	Al-Adalah		
2016–2024	Al-Fateh	78	(0)
2019	→ Al-Adalah (loan)	16	(1)
2024–2025	Al-Okhdood	18	(0)
2025–	Al-Riyadh	2	(0)
2026–	→ Al-Adalah (loan)	0	(0)
- * Club domestic league appearances and goals

Mohammed Khalifah Al-Saeed (Arabic: محمد خليفة السعيد; born November 14, 1996) is a Saudi football player who plays as a winger and left back for Al-Adalah, on loan from Al-Riyadh.

== Career ==
On 28 June 2016, Al-Saeed joined Al-Fateh on a five-year deal. On 25 October 2020, Al-Saeed renewed his contract with Al-Fateh.

On 17 July 2024, Al-Saeed joined Al-Okhdood on a free transfer.

On 27 August 2025, Al-Saeed joined Al-Riyadh.
