= Habib Al-Wotayan =

Saudi Arabian footballer

Personal information
- Full name: Habib Yasseen Kadhim Al-Wotayan
- Date of birth: 7 August 1996 (age 30)
- Place of birth: Al-Hasa, Saudi Arabia
- Height: 1.82 m (6 ft 0 in)
- Position: Goalkeeper

Team information
- Current team: Al-Fateh
- Number: 31

Youth career
- 2012–2015: Al-Fateh

Senior career*
Years	Team	Apps	(Gls)
2015–2020	Al-Fateh	12	(0)
2020–2024	Al-Hilal	10	(0)
2022	→ Al-Hazem (loan)	0	(0)
2024–	Al-Fateh	0	(0)
- * Club domestic league appearances and goals as of 23 May 2023

Habib Al-Wotayan (Arabic: حبيب الوطيان; born 7 August 1996) is a Saudi Arabian professional footballer who plays for Al-Fateh as a goalkeeper.

== Career ==
Al-Wotayan started his career with Al-Fateh at 15 in 2012 where he was promoted from the youth team to the first team in 2015. He played his first match against Al-Ahli after the first-choice goalkeeper Maksym Koval was injured. On October 21, 2020, Al-Wotayan signed with Al-Hilal. On 30 January 2022, Al-Wotayan joined Al-Hazem on loan. On 1 September 2024, Al-Wotayan returned to Al-Fateh on a four-year contract.

== Career statistics ==
As of match played 27 June 2022

Club	Season	League			King Cup		Asia		Other		Total	
Club	Season	Division	Apps	Goals	Apps	Goals	Apps	Goals	Apps	Goals	Apps	Goals
Al-Fateh	2018–19	Pro League	0	0	0	0	—		—		0	0
Al-Fateh	2019–20	Pro League	12	0	0	0	—		—		12	0
Al-Fateh	Total		12	0	0	0	0	0	0	0	12	0
Al-Hilal	2020–21	Pro League	8	0	1	0	0	0	0	0	9	0
Al-Hilal	2022–23	Pro League	2	0	0	0	0	0	0	0	2	0
Al-Hilal	2023–24	Pro League	0	0	0	0	1	0	1 (Note: Appearances in Arab Club Champions Cup)	0	2	0
Al-Hilal	Total		10	0	1	0	1	0	1	0	13	0
Al-Hazem (loan)	2021–22	Pro League	0	0	0	0	—		—		0	0
Career totals			22	0	1	0	1	0	1	0	25	0

== Honours ==
Al-Hilal

- Saudi Professional League: 2020–21, 2023–24
- King Cup: 2019–20, 2022–23, 2023–24
- Saudi Super Cup: 2021, 2023
- AFC Champions League: 2021
