= Marwane Saâdane =

Moroccan footballer

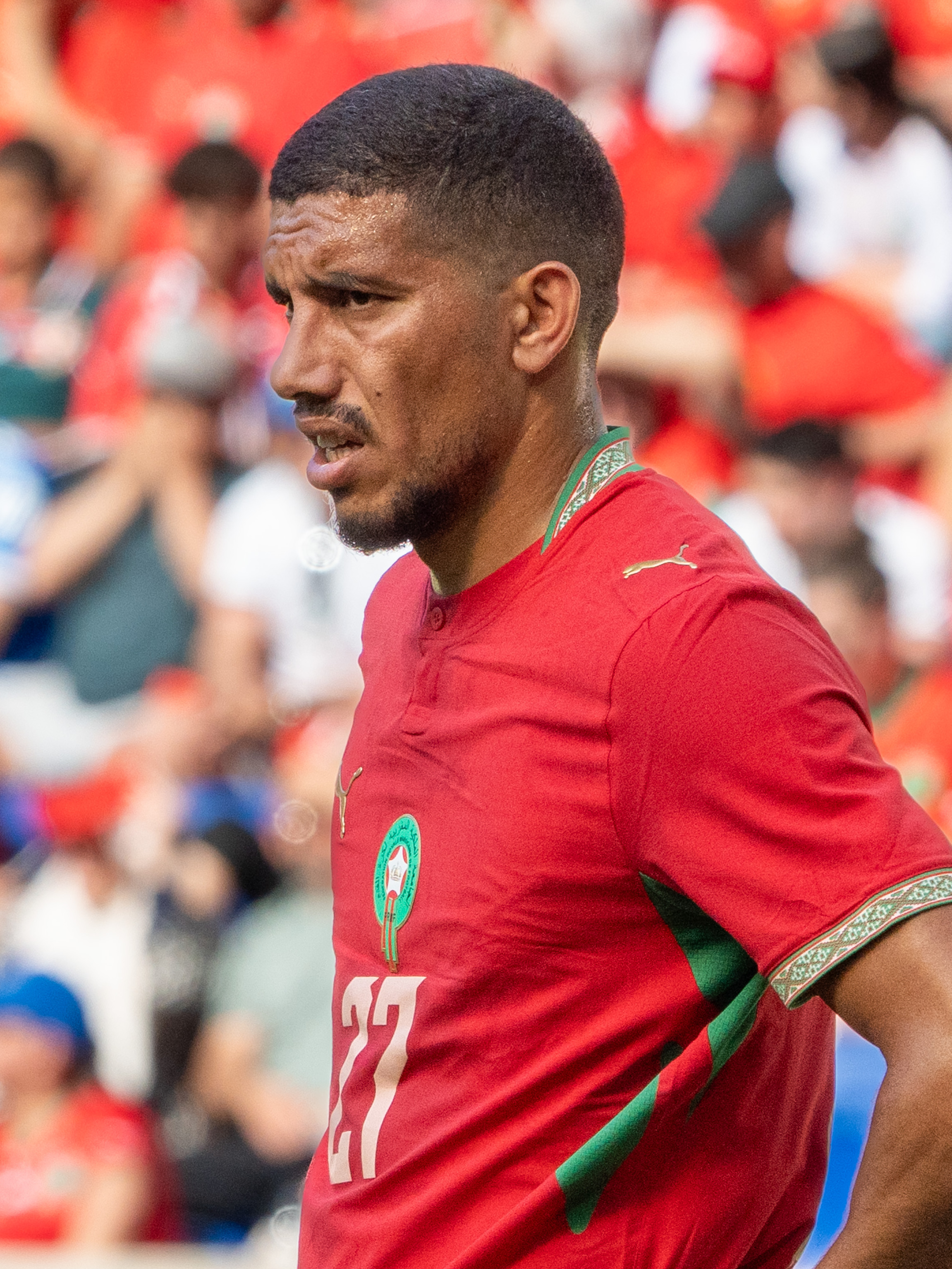
- Saâdane with Morocco in 2026

Personal information
- Full name: Marwane Saâdane
- Date of birth: 17 January 1992 (age 34)
- Place of birth: Mohammedia, Morocco
- Height: 1.79 m (5 ft 10 in)
- Positions: Centre-back; defensive midfielder

Team information
- Current team: Al Fateh
- Number: 17

Youth career
- Chabab Mohammedia

Senior career*
Years	Team	Apps	(Gls)
2014–2016	FUS de Rabat	58	(6)
2016–2019	Çaykur Rizespor	89	(5)
2019–	Al-Fateh	172	(15)

International career^{‡}
2010–2012	Morocco U20	3	(0)
2012–2014	Morocco U23	5	(0)
2015–	Morocco	9	(0)
Medal record
Representing Morocco
Men's football
FIFA Arab Cup
Winner	2025 Qatar	Team
- * Club domestic league appearances and goals as of 20:30, 24 April 2026 (UTC) ‡ National team caps and goals as of 19:29, 4 July 2026 (UTC)

Marwane Saâdane (Arabic: مروان سعدان, romanized: Marwān Saʿdān; born 17 January 1992) is a Moroccan professional football player who captains Saudi Pro League club Al Fateh and plays for the Morocco national team.

Though not initially part of the Morocco squad for the 2026 FIFA World Cup, Saâdane was called up on 11 June 2026 to replace an injured Nayef Aguerd.

== Honours ==
FUS Rabat

- Botola Pro: 2015–16
- Moroccan Throne Cup: 2014

Çaykur Rizespor

- TFF 1. Lig: 2017–18

Morocco A'

- FIFA Arab Cup: 2025
