= Mohammed Al-Fuhaid =

Saudi Arabian footballer

Personal information
- Full name: Mohammed Al-Fuhaid
- Date of birth: January 8, 1990 (age 36)
- Place of birth: Al-Hasa, Saudi Arabia
- Height: 1.71 m (5 ft 7 in)

Team information
- Current team: Al-Faisaly
- Number: 28

Youth career
- 2002-2009: Al-Fateh

Senior career*
Years	Team	Apps	(Gls)
2009–2025	Al-Fateh	345	(2)
2025–	Al-Faisaly	0	(0)

International career^{‡}
2019	Saudi Arabia	3	(0)
- * Club domestic league appearances and goals as of 22:43, 26 May 2025 (UTC) ‡ National team caps and goals as of 21:32, 10 August 2019 (UTC)

Mohammed Al-Fuhaid (Arabic: محمد الفهيد; born January 8, 1990) is a Saudi professional footballer who plays as a midfielder for Saudi FDL club Al-Faisaly. Al-Fuhaid is holds the record for most appearances in the Saudi Pro League with 345 appearances.

== Career ==
On 21 September 2025, Al-Fuhaid joined Saudi FDL club Al-Faisaly after 16 years at Al-Fateh.

== Career statistics ==
=== Club ===
As of 28 May 2024.

Club	Season	League		King Cup		Crown Prince Cup (Note: Discontinued in September 19, 2017)		Asia		Other		Total	
Club	Season	Apps	Goals	Apps	Goals	Apps	Goals	Apps	Goals	Apps	Goals	Apps	Goals
Al-Fateh	2009–10	1	0	0	0	0	0	–	–	–	–	1	0
Al-Fateh	2010–11	17	0	0	0	1	0	–	–	–	–	18	0
Al-Fateh	2011–12	23	0	2	0	1	0	–	–	–	–	26	0
Al-Fateh	2012–13	19	0	4	0	2	0	–	–	2 (Note: Appearances in Arab Club Champions Cup)	0	27	0
Al-Fateh	2013–14	22	0	2	0	4	0	6	1	1 (Note: Appearances in Saudi Super Cup)	0	35	1
Al-Fateh	2014–15	21	0	2	0	1	0	–	–	–	–	24	0
Al-Fateh	2015–16	24	1	1	0	1	0	–	–	–	–	26	1
Al-Fateh	2016–17	17	0	2	0	2	0	3	0	–	–	24	0
Al-Fateh	2017–18	24	0	2	0	1	0	–	–	–	–	27	0
Al-Fateh	2018–19	28	1	1	0	–	–	–	–	–	–	29	1
Al-Fateh	2019–20	25	0	4	0	–	–	–	–	–	–	29	0
Al-Fateh	2020–21	28	0	2	0	–	–	–	–	–	–	30	0
Al-Fateh	2021–22	28	0	1	0	–	–	–	–	–	–	29	0
Al-Fateh	2022–23	25	0	1	0	–	–	–	–	–	–	26	0
Al-Fateh	2023–24	25	0	1	0	–	–	–	–	–	–	26	0
Al-Fateh	2024–25	18	0	0	0	–	–	–	–	–	–	18	0
Al-Fateh	Total	345	2	26	0	13	0	9	1	3	0	396	3
Career Total		345	2	26	0	13	0	9	1	3	0	396	3

== Honours ==
Al-Fateh

- Saudi Pro League: 2012–13
- Saudi Super Cup: 2013
