= Mohammed Al-Waked =

Saudi Arabian footballer

Personal information
- Full name: Mohammed Ahmed Al-Waked
- Date of birth: 31 December 1991 (age 34)
- Place of birth: Saudi Arabia
- Height: 1.82 m (6 ft 0 in)
- Position: Goalkeeper

Team information
- Current team: Al-Jabalain
- Number: 30

Youth career
- 2010–2013: Al-Hilal

Senior career*
Years	Team	Apps	(Gls)
2013–2022	Al-Hilal	3	(0)
2015	→ Al-Shoulla (loan)	13	(0)
2020–2021	→ Al-Qadsiah (loan)	3	(0)
2022–	Al-Jabalain	0	(0)
- * Club domestic league appearances and goals as of 17:07, 5 June 2016 (UTC)

Mohammed Ahmed Al-Waked (Arabic: مُحَمَّد أَحْمَد الْوَاكِد, born 31 December 1991) is a Saudi Arabian footballer who plays as a goalkeeper for Al-Jabalain.

== Club career ==
=== Al-Hilal ===
On 4 December 2013, Al-Hilal promoted Mohammed Al-Waked due to manager Sami Al-Jaber interest, Al-Hilal gave him a three-year professional contract.

==== Al-Shoulla (loan) ====
On 10 January 2015, Al-Shoulla loaned Al-Waked for the rest of the 2014–15 season. On February 6, Al-Waked played his professional debut against his parent club Al-Hilal, which they lost 2–1. On February 14, Mohammed played his second match against Al-Khaleej, Al-Shoulla drew 1–1. On March 22, Al-Waked won his first league game when he played against Al-Taawoun, his team won 4–3. On April 4, Al-Waked kept a clean sheet for Al-Shoulla against Al-Fateh. On May 15, He played last match for Al-Shoulla against Al-Faisaly, which Al-Shoulla won 2–1. He returned to Al-Hilal in 2015.

==== Al-Jabalain ====
On 29 January 2022, Al-Waked joined Al-Jabalain.

== Honours ==
=== Club ===
Al-Hilal

- Saudi Professional League: 2016–17, 2017–18, 2019–20
- King Cup: 2015, 2017
- Saudi Crown Prince Cup: 2012–13, 2015–16
- Saudi Super Cup: 2015, 2018, 2021
- AFC Champions League: 2019, 2021
