= Ali Al-Zaqaan =

Saudi Arabian footballer

Personal information
- Full name: Ali Ahmed Al-Zaqaan
- Date of birth: 1 November 1991 (age 35)
- Place of birth: Saudi Arabia
- Height: 1.76 m (5 ft 9 in)
- Position: Winger

Team information
- Current team: Al-Arabi
- Number: 26

Youth career
- Al-Ettifaq

Senior career*
Years	Team	Apps	(Gls)
2011–2017	Al-Ettifaq	79	(7)
2016	→ Al-Wehda (loan)	11	(0)
2017	→ Al-Fateh (loan)	7	(0)
2017–2022	Al-Fateh	101	(16)
2018–2019	→ Al-Ittihad (loan)	3	(0)
2022–2023	Al-Fayha	25	(0)
2023–2025	Al-Riyadh	18	(1)
2025–	Al-Arabi	0	(0)

International career^{‡}
2017–	Saudi Arabia	2	(1)
- * Club domestic league appearances and goals as of 15 September 2023 ‡ National team caps and goals as of 20 January 2018

Ali Ahmed Al-Zaqaan (Arabic: علي أحمد الزقعان; born 1 November 1991) is a Saudi professional footballer who plays as a winger for Saudi club Al-Arabi.

== Career ==
On 30 January 2022, Al-Zaqaan joined Al-Fayha.

On 7 August 2023, Al-Zaqaan joined Al-Riyadh.

On 12 January 2025, Al-Zaqaan joined First Division club Al-Arabi.

== Honours ==
Al-Fayha

- King Cup: 2021–22
