= Mohammed Naji =

Iraqi politician (born 1965)

Mohammed Naji محمد ناجي

Member of Parliament for Baghdad
- Incumbent
- Assumed office 2008
- President: Fuad Masum

Personal details
- Born: 7 March 1965 (age 61) Baghdad, Iraq
- Party: Badr Organization
- Education: Baghdad University

Mohammed Naji (Arabic: محمد ناجي محمد; born 7 March 1965) is an Iraqi politician, Deputy in the Iraqi parliament, the head of the "Badr parliamentary organization" and Leading member of Badr Organization.

== Positions ==
- Deputy in the Iraqi parliament.
- He was also elected Executive Secretary of the United Iraqi Coalition in the second parliamentary session
- As of 2018 he was the executive secretary of the Badr Political Bureau
- Member of the Parliamentary Security and Defense Committee
