= Mohammad Naji =

Saudi Arabian footballer (born 1993)

Personal information
- Full name: Mohammad Naji Abdulrahman Abo Ayed
- Date of birth: 30 October 1993 (age 33)
- Place of birth: Yanbu, Saudi Arabia
- Height: 1.76 m (5 ft 9 in)
- Position: Defender

Team information
- Current team: Al-Jandal
- Number: 4

Youth career
- Radwa

Senior career*
Years	Team	Apps	(Gls)
2014–2016	Radwa		
2016–2018	Ohod	3	(0)
2018–2019	Al-Jeel	35	(2)
2019–2021	Al-Fateh	34	(2)
2021–2023	Al-Batin	50	(0)
2023–2025	Abha	50	(3)
2025–2026	Al-Sadd	11	(0)
2026–	Al-Jandal	0	(0)
- * Club domestic league appearances and goals as of 15 April 2023

Mohammad Naji (Arabic: محمد ناجي; born 30 October 1993) is a Saudi Arabian professional footballer who plays as a defender for Al-Jandal.

== Career ==
Mohammad Naji started his career at Radwa playing in the Saudi Third Division. On 19 July 2016, Naji left Radwa and joined First Division side Ohod. He was part of the squad that earned promotion to the Pro League for the first time since 2005. On 19 August 2018, Naji left Ohod and joined Al-Jeel on a one-year contract. On 24 June 2019, Naji left Al-Jeel and joined Pro League side Al-Fateh on a three-year contract. On 3 July 2021, Naji joined Al-Batin. On 13 July 2023, Naji joined Abha on a two-year deal. On 3 October 2025, Naji joined Al-Sadd. On 26 January 2026, Naji joined Al-Jandal.
