= 2020–21 Al-Fateh SC season =

Al-Fateh
2020–21 season
- President: Saad Al-Afaliq
- Manager: Yannick Ferrera
- Stadium: Prince Abdullah bin Jalawi Stadium
- SPL: 7th
- King Cup: Semi-finals (knocked out by Al-Taawoun)
- Top goalscorer: League: Mitchell te Vrede (13); All: Mitchell te Vrede (13)
- Highest home attendance: 1,573 (vs. Al-Qadsiah, 25 May 2021)
- All statistics correct as of 30 May 2021.

The 2020–21 season was Al-Fateh's 12th consecutive season in the Pro League and their 63rd year in existence. Al Fateh was a Saudi club. The club participated in the Pro League and the King Cup.

The season covered the period from 22 September 2020 to 30 June 2021.

== Players ==
=== Squad information ===
As of 1 February 2021

Note: Flags indicate national team as defined under FIFA eligibility rules; some limited exceptions apply. Players may hold more than one non-FIFA nationality.

No.	Pos.	Nation	Player
1	GK	KSA	Basil Al-Bahrani
2	DF	KSA	Nawaf Boushal
3	DF	KSA	Mohammad Naji
4	DF	KSA	Saleh Al-Nashmi
5	DF	KSA	Fahad Al-Harbi
9	FW	SUR	Mitchell te Vrede
10	MF	PER	Christian Cueva
11	MF	MAR	Mourad Batna
12	MF	KSA	Majed Kanabah
14	MF	KSA	Mohammed Al-Fuhaid (captain)
15	DF	KSA	Ziyad Al-Jari
16	MF	SDN	Mohammed Al-Dhaw
17	MF	MAR	Marwane Saâdane
18	MF	KSA	Mohammed Al-Saeed
19	FW	KSA	Mohammed Majrashi
20	MF	KSA	Murtadha Al-Khodrawi

No.	Pos.	Nation	Player
22	FW	ALG	Hillal Soudani
23	DF	KSA	Abdullah Al-Yousef
24	DF	KSA	Ammar Al-Daheem
25	DF	KSA	Tawfiq Buhimed (vice-captain)
26	MF	KSA	Ali Al-Zaqaan
28	MF	ALG	Sofiane Bendebka
33	GK	KSA	Ali Al-Shohaib
34	GK	KSA	Mohammed Al-Burayh
35	GK	UKR	Maksym Koval
36	MF	KSA	Abbas Al-Hassan
37	MF	KSA	Ali Al-Jassem
38	FW	KSA	Othman Al-Othman
77	MF	KSA	Hassan Al-Habib
87	DF	KSA	Qassem Lajami
99	FW	KSA	Abdullah Al-Bladi

=== Out on loan ===
Note: Flags indicate national team as defined under FIFA eligibility rules; some limited exceptions apply. Players may hold more than one non-FIFA nationality.

No.	Pos.	Nation	Player
16	MF	KSA	Munther Al-Nakhli (at Al-Fayha until 30 June 2021)

== Transfers and loans ==
=== Transfers in ===
Entry date	Position	No.	Player	From club	Fee	Ref.
22 September 2020	DF	4	(Saudi Arabia) Saleh Al-Nashmi	(Saudi Arabia) Al-Thoqbah	Free	
22 September 2020	DF	20	(Saudi Arabia) Murtadha Al-Khodrawi	(Saudi Arabia) Modhar	Free	
22 September 2020	MF	77	(Saudi Arabia) Hassan Al-Habib	(Saudi Arabia) Al-Hazem	Undisclosed	
22 September 2020	MF	11	(Morocco) Mourad Batna	(United Arab Emirates) Al-Jazira	Free	
22 September 2020	FW	99	(Saudi Arabia) Abdullah Al-Bladi	(Saudi Arabia) Al-Thoqbah	End of loan	
29 September 2020	DF	5	(Saudi Arabia) Fahad Al-Harbi	(Saudi Arabia) Al-Bukayriyah	Free	
30 September 2020	DF	24	(Saudi Arabia) Ammar Al-Daheem	(Saudi Arabia) Al-Ittihad	Free	
25 January 2021	MF	10	(Peru) Christian Cueva	(Turkey) Yeni Malatyaspor	Free	
30 January 2021	FW	22	(Algeria) Hillal Soudani	(Greece) Olympiacos	Free	

=== Transfers out ===
Exit date	Position	No.	Player	To club	Fee	Ref.
22 September 2020	DF	78	(Saudi Arabia) Ali Lajami	(Saudi Arabia) Al-Nassr	$6,665,000	
5 October 2020	MF	6	(Saudi Arabia) Ali Al-Hassan	(Saudi Arabia) Al-Nassr	$6,665,000	
21 October 2020	GK	30	(Saudi Arabia) Habib Al-Wotayan	(Saudi Arabia) Al-Hilal	$1,333,000	
23 October 2020	DF	17	(Uruguay) Matías Aguirregaray		Released	
25 October 2020	MF	27	(Saudi Arabia) Saeed Al-Dossari	(Saudi Arabia) Al-Kawkab	Free	
22 January 2021	MF	8	(Serbia) Saša Jovanović		Released	
7 February 2021	FW	7	(Saudi Arabia) Saqer Otaif	(Saudi Arabia) Al-Fayha	Free	

=== Loans out ===
Start date	End date	Position	No.	Player	To club	Fee	Ref.
7 October 2020	End of season	MF	16	(Saudi Arabia) Munther Al-Nakhli	(Saudi Arabia) Al-Fayha	None	

== Pre-season ==
28 September 2020 Friendly	Jeddah (Saudi Arabia)	2–1	(Saudi Arabia) Al-Fateh	Jeddah, Saudi Arabia
19:00 AST	Sory (pen.); Gharwi	Report	Al-Habib 27'	Stadium: King Abdullah Sports City Reserve Stadium

2 October 2020 Friendly	Al-Raed (Saudi Arabia)	1–1	(Saudi Arabia) Al-Fateh	Jeddah, Saudi Arabia
19:00 AST	Al-Showaish 89'	Report	te Vrede 56'	Stadium: King Abdullah Sports City Reserve Stadium

9 October 2020 Friendly	Al-Wehda (Saudi Arabia)	1–2	(Saudi Arabia) Al-Fateh	Jeddah, Saudi Arabia
19:00 AST	Kariri 18'	Report	Bendebka 51'; Otaif 74'	Stadium: King Abdullah Sports City Reserve Stadium

== Competitions ==
=== Overview ===
Competition	Record							
Competition	G	W	D	L	GF	GA	GD	Win %
Pro League	30	12	6	12	55	55	+0	40.00
King Cup	3	2	0	1	6	4	+2	66.67
Total	33	14	6	13	61	59	+2	42.42

Updated to match played 30 May 2021
Source: Competitions

=== Pro League ===
==== League table ====
Pos	Team	Pld	W	D	L	GF	GA	GD	Pts	Qualification or relegation
5	Al-Ettifaq	30	14	5	11	50	48	+2	47 (Note: Positions determined by head-to-head points: Al-Taawoun 4 pts; Al-Ettifaq 1 pt.)	
6	Al-Nassr	30	13	7	10	53	40	+13	46	
7	Al-Fateh	30	12	6	12	55	55	0	42	
8	Al-Ahli	30	11	6	13	44	56	−12	39	
9	Al-Faisaly	30	9	9	12	42	47	−5	36 (Note: Positions determined by head-to-head points: Al-Faisaly: 16 pts; Al-Raed: 15 pts; Damac: 13 pts; Al-Batin: 12 pts; Abha: 3 pts.)	Qualification for the Champions League group stage (Note: Al-Faisaly qualified for the Champions League group stage as 2020–21 King Cup winners.)

Source: spl.com source=إحصائيات رابطة دوري المحترفين السعودي 2020-2021
Rules for classification: 1) Points; 2) Head-to-head points; 3) Head-to-head goal difference; 4) Total goal difference; 5) Total goals scored; 6) Fair-play points (Note: Head-to-head record is used only after all the matches between the teams in question have been played).

==== Results summary ====
Overall								Home						Away					
Pld	W	D	L	GF	GA	GD	Pts	W	D	L	GF	GA	GD	W	D	L	GF	GA	GD
30	12	6	12	55	55	0	42	4	3	8	27	32	−5	8	3	4	28	23	+5

Last updated: 30 May 2021.
Source: spl.com.sa

==== Results by round ====
Round	1	2	3	4	5	6	7	8	9	10	11	12	13	14	15	16	17	18	19	20	21	22	23	24	25	26	27	28	29	30
Ground	A	H	A	H	A	A	H	H	A	H	A	A	H	A	H	H	A	H	A	H	H	A	A	H	A	H	H	A	H	A
Result	W	D	W	L	W	L	L	L	L	W	W	D	L	D	L	D	L	W	W	L	L	L	W	W	W	D	L	W	W	D
Position	4	4	1	6	3	4	7	11	13	8	8	7	11	11	11	12	13	11	10	11	13	14	12	9	9	8	7	7	7	7

Updated to match(es) played on 30 May 2021. Source: spl.com.sa
A = Away; H = Home; W = Win; D = Draw; L = Loss

==== Matches ====
All times are local, AST (UTC+3).

Win Draw Loss Postponed

18 October 2020 1	Al-Nassr	1–2	Al-Fateh	Riyadh
18:00	Adam (yellow card) 7'; Kim Jin-su (yellow card) 41'; K. Al-Ghannam 53'; Al-Buraikan (yellow card) 81'	Report	Bendebka 12', 63'	Stadium: Prince Faisal bin Fahd Stadium; Attendance: 0 Referee: Majed Al-Shamrani

24 October 2020 2	Al-Fateh	2–2	Al-Ittihad	Al-Hasa
19:55	Al-Fuhaid (yellow card) 18'; Boushal (yellow card) 25'; Al-Daheem (yellow card) 42' te Vrede 50' (pen.); Batna (yellow card) 60'; Al-Zaqaan 64'	Report	Romarinho 43'; Henrique 90+3'	Stadium: Prince Abdullah bin Jalawi Stadium; Attendance: 0 Referee: Khaled Al-Teris

30 October 2020 3	Al-Ain	2–4	Al-Fateh	Al Bahah
15:40	Getterson 32'; Moutari (yellow card) 39'; Foaad 64'; Bradarić (yellow card) 75'; Kabi (red card) 89'	Report	Boushal 3'; Kanabah (yellow card) 81'; Batna 82', 90+5'; Wikheim 90'	Stadium: King Saud Sport City Stadium; Attendance: 0 Referee: Mohammed Al-Nuhait

7 November 2020 4	Al-Fateh	1–3	Al-Shabab	Al-Hasa
17:35	Al-Daheem (yellow card) 15'; Bendebka 37' (pen.); Al-Habib (red card) 85'; Al-Zaqaan (yellow card) 90'	Report	Al-Shamekh (yellow card) 7'; Lichnovsky (yellow card) 66'; Al-Ammar 74', 90+6'; Martins 78'; Diop (yellow card) 82'; Al-Hamdan (yellow card) 90+5'	Stadium: Prince Abdullah bin Jalawi Stadium; Attendance: 0 Referee: Faisal Al-Blwi

24 November 2020 5	Al-Ettifaq	0–4	Al-Fateh	Dammam
19:30	Al-Khateeb (yellow card) 62'; Al-Qumaizi (yellow card) 70'; Mahnashi (yellow card) 90'	Report	Bendebka 17' (pen.); Boushal 30'; Al-Saeed (yellow card) 34'; Al-Zaqaan 37', 63'; Buhimed (yellow card) 90+2'	Stadium: Prince Mohamed bin Fahd Stadium; Attendance: 0 Referee: Majed Al-Shamrani

3 December 2020 6	Al-Hilal	3–0	Al-Fateh	Riyadh
17:40	Kharbin (yellow card) 27', (goal) 31'; Al-Dawsari 47'; Kanno 52'; Vietto (yellow card) 71'	Report	Naji (yellow card) 48'; Saâdane (yellow card) 83'	Stadium: King Fahd International Stadium; Attendance: 0 Referee: Mohammed Al-Nuhait

7 December 2020 7	Al-Fateh	1–3	Abha	Al-Hasa
17:30	Bendebka 45+3' (pen.); Al-Fuhaid (yellow card) 47'; Saâdane (yellow card) 78'	Report	Strandberg 8', 82'; Goodwin 18'; Aouadhi (yellow card) 41'; Amr (yellow card) 50'	Stadium: Prince Abdullah bin Jalawi Stadium; Attendance: 0 Referee: Mohammed Al-Qarni

12 December 2020 8	Al-Fateh	1–2	Al-Batin	Hofuf
17:30	Saâdane (yellow card) 31'; Jovanović 47'; Koval (yellow card) 90+11'	Report	Al-Shamlan 4', (yellow card) 22'; Schenk (yellow card) 37'; Al-Qarni (yellow card) 39'; Rayhi 45+6'; Chaves (yellow card) 50'; El Jebli (yellow card) 90+11'	Stadium: Prince Abdullah bin Jalawi Stadium; Attendance: 0 Referee: Ahmad Al-Rumaikhani

22 December 2020 9	Al-Ahli	1–0	Al-Fateh	Jeddah
19:50	Al Somah 53'; Hawsawi (yellow card) 90+3'	Report	Al-Daheem (yellow card) 42'; Koval (yellow card) 78'	Stadium: King Abdullah Sports City Reserve Stadium; Attendance: 0 Referee: Khaled Salwi

27 December 2020 10	Al-Fateh	3–2	Al-Faisaly	Al-Hasa
17:35	Al-Zaqaan 18', 45+1'; Batna 35'; Otaif (yellow card) 69'; Saâdane (yellow card) 70'; Bendebka (red card) 85'; Buhimed (yellow card) 90+4'	Report	Al-Sharid (yellow card) 38'; Al-Saiari 72'; Tavares 72'; Omar (yellow card) 79'; H. Qassem (yellow card) 90+6'	Stadium: Prince Abdullah bin Jalawi Stadium; Attendance: 0 Referee: Sami Al-Jires

1 January 2021 11	Damac	1–2	Al-Fateh	Abha
15:45	Saidani (yellow card) 40'; Vittor (yellow card) 50'; Hamzi 54', (yellow card) 64'	Report	Batna 25' (pen.); Al-Saeed (yellow card) 45+4' te Vrede 48', (yellow card) 60'; Boushal (yellow card) 78'; Al-Nashmi (yellow card) 90+1'	Stadium: Prince Sultan bin Abdul Aziz Stadium; Attendance: 0 Referee: Turki Al-Khudhayr

7 January 2021 12	Al-Wehda	0–0	Al-Fateh	Mecca
18:35	Niakaté (yellow card) 54'; Pedrão (yellow card) 71'; Bakshween (yellow card) 90+4'	Report	Naji (yellow card) 57'; Al-Othman (yellow card) 90'	Stadium: King Abdul Aziz Stadium; Attendance: 0 Referee: Sultan Al-Harbi

14 January 2021 13	Al-Fateh	1–2	Al-Taawoun	Al-Hasa
17:50	Bendebka 11'; Boushal (yellow card) 90+5'	Report	Assiri (yellow card) 10'; Al-Daheem 45+2' (o.g.); Santos 50'	Stadium: Prince Abdullah bin Jalawi Stadium; Attendance: 0 Referee: Sandro Schärer (Switzerland)

19 January 2021 14	Al-Qadsiah	1–1	Al-Fateh	Khobar
17:50	Al-Dawsari 29'; Williams (yellow card) 90+8'	Report	Al-Fuhaid (yellow card) 59'; Boushal (yellow card) 80' te Vrede 90+9' (pen.)	Stadium: Prince Saud bin Jalawi Stadium; Attendance: 0 Referee: Turki Al-Khudhayr

24 January 2021 15	Al-Fateh	0–2	Al-Raed	Al-Hasa
17:55	te Vrede (yellow card) 34'; Al-Daheem (yellow card) 53'; Al-Yousef (yellow card) 64'	Report	Djoum 22' (pen.); Al-Fahad (yellow card) 31'; El Berkaoui (yellow card) 45+3'; Al-Sahli 90+4', (yellow card) 90+6'	Stadium: Prince Abdullah bin Jalawi Stadium; Attendance: 0 Referee: Abdullah Al-Shehri

4 February 2021 17	Al-Ittihad	4–1	Al-Fateh	Mecca
18:50	Al-Muwallad 9'; Prijović 31', 51'; Al-Aboud (yellow card) 85'; Grohe (yellow card) 90+3'; Camara 90+3'	Report	te Vrede 2'; Buhimed (yellow card) 35'; Al-Fuhaid (yellow card) 45'; Saâdane (yellow card) 53'	Stadium: King Abdul Aziz Stadium; Attendance: 0 Referee: Ahmad Al-Rumaikhani

9 February 2021 16	Al-Fateh	1–1	Al-Nassr	Al-Hasa
18:10	Bendebka (yellow card) 22'; Al-Hassan 89' (o.g.); Koval (yellow card) 90+6'	Report	Al-Hassan (yellow card) 34'; Yahya (yellow card) 90'; Hamdallah 90+7' (pen.)	Stadium: Prince Abdullah bin Jalawi Stadium; Attendance: 0 Referee: Khaled Al-Teris

13 February 2021 18	Al-Fateh	3–2	Al-Ain	Al-Hasa
18:10	Al-Daheem (yellow card) 21'; Soudani (yellow card) 46' te Vrede 53', 75', 84'; Buhimed (yellow card) 90+7'	Report	Bastos 50', (yellow card) 90+5'; Juanpi 61'; Moutari (yellow card) 82'; Ndiaye (yellow card) 90+3'	Stadium: Prince Abdullah bin Jalawi Stadium; Attendance: 0 Referee: Majed Al-Shamrani

17 February 2021 19	Al-Shabab	1–2	Al-Fateh	Riyadh
18:25	Guanca 43'; Al-Abed (yellow card) 81'	Report	Cueva 67' te Vrede 90+3'	Stadium: Prince Khalid bin Sultan Stadium; Attendance: 0 Referee: Mohammed Al-Nuhait

23 February 2021 20	Al-Fateh	2–3	Al-Ettifaq	Al-Hasa
18:20	Buhimed 36'; Al-Fuhaid (yellow card) 50' te Vrede 62' (pen.)	Report	Azaro (yellow card) 23', (goal) 47'; Ghazi (yellow card) 41'; Kiss (yellow card) 55'; Mets (yellow card) 62'; Al-Kwikbi 66'; Sliti 79'	Stadium: Prince Abdullah bin Jalawi Stadium; Attendance: 0 Referee: Turki Al-Khudhayr

28 February 2021 21	Al-Fateh	2–5	Al-Hilal	Al-Hasa
18:20	Soudani (yellow card) 45+2'; Al-Daheem 66', (yellow card) 90+3'; Cueva 81' (pen.); Boushal (yellow card) 82'	Report	Carrillo 23'; Gomis 26'; Vietto 40'; N. Al-Dawsari (yellow card) 45+4'; S. Al-Dawsari 72', 84'	Stadium: Prince Abdullah bin Jalawi Stadium; Attendance: 0 Referee: Khaled Salwi

5 March 2021 22	Abha	2–1	Al-Fateh	Abha
16:10	Bguir 33'; Tahrat (yellow card) 45+3'; Strandberg 78'; Al-Jumeiah (yellow card) 90+1'; Mhamdi (yellow card) 90+6'; Sharahili (yellow card) 90+7'	Report	Cueva (yellow card) 80' te Vrede 90'	Stadium: Prince Sultan bin Abdul Aziz Stadium; Attendance: 0 Referee: Sami Al-Jires

10 March 2021 23	Al-Batin	0–2	Al-Fateh	Hafar al-Batin
15:50	Al-Shammeri (yellow card) 62'; Hadl (yellow card) 75'; Al-Owdah (yellow card) 89'; Chaves (yellow card) 90+6'	Report	Batna 1', (yellow card) 73' te Vrede 65'; Soudani (yellow card) 75'; Al-Zaqaan (yellow card) 90'	Stadium: Al-Batin Club Stadium; Attendance: 0 Referee: Raed Al-Zahrani

20 March 2021 24	Al-Fateh	4–1	Al-Ahli	Al-Hasa
18:30	Al-Fuhaid (yellow card) 8' (yellow-red card) 58'; Majrashi 12', 69'; Cueva 36' (pen.), 71'	Report	Al-Absi (yellow card) 35', (goal) 84'; Lima (yellow card) 90'	Stadium: Prince Abdullah bin Jalawi Stadium; Attendance: 0 Referee: Turki Al-Khudhayr

10 April 2021 25	Al-Faisaly	2–3	Al-Fateh	Al Majma'ah
18:55	Tavares 19'; Al-Ahmed (yellow card) 34'; Faik 50'	Report	Lajami 23'; Saâdane (yellow card) 47' te Vrede 68'; Batna (yellow card) 70'; Cueva 90+3'	Stadium: Al Majma'ah Sports City; Attendance: 0 Referee: Khaled Al-Teris

17 April 2021 26	Al-Fateh	1–1	Damac	Al-Hasa
21:35	Boushal (yellow card) 20'; Bendebka 43'; Soudani (yellow card) 69'	Report	Al-Najej (yellow card) 6'; Zelaya 65' (pen.); Al-Rio (yellow card) 83'; Chafaï (yellow card) 90+4'	Stadium: Prince Abdullah bin Jalawi Stadium; Attendance: 0 Referee: Mohammed Al-Beredi

25 April 2021 28	Al-Taawoun	3–4	Al-Fateh	Buraidah
22:00	Tawamba 11'; Al-Zubaidi (yellow card) 14'; Assiri (yellow card) 40'; Abousaban (yellow card) 40'; Saâdane 45' (o.g.); Santos (yellow card) 76'; Kaku 90+2' (pen.)	Report	Santos 16' (o.g.); Bendebka 55', 76'; Cueva (yellow card) 60'; Majrashi 80'	Stadium: King Abdullah Sport City Stadium; Attendance: 0 Referee: Mohammed Al-Qarni

15 May 2021 27	Al-Fateh	2–3	Al-Wehda	Al-Hasa
18:55	Batna 20' (pen.); Cueva 37'; Al-Yousef (yellow card) 45+4'; Buhimed (yellow card) 76'; Lajami (yellow card) 83'	Report	Petratos 10'; Anselmo (yellow card) 38'; Al-Khulaif 39', (yellow card) 56'; Al-Eisa 87'; Al-Qarni (yellow card) 90'	Stadium: Prince Abdullah bin Jalawi Stadium; Attendance: 0 Referee: Majed Al-Shamrani

25 May 2021 29	Al-Fateh	3–0	Al-Qadsiah	Al-Hasa
21:00	te Vrede 19'; Cueva 58'; Soudani 68'	Report	Al-Amri (yellow card) 5'; Al-Shoeil (yellow card) 55'	Stadium: Prince Abdullah bin Jalawi Stadium; Attendance: 1,573; Referee: Sultan Al-Harbi

30 May 2021 30	Al-Raed	2–2	Al-Fateh	Buraidah
21:00	El Berkaoui 45+1' (pen.); Al-Showaish 45+4'; Fernández (yellow card) 63'; Al-Khathlan (yellow card) 90+7'	Report	Soudani 40'; Saâdane (yellow card) 71'; Cueva 74'; Buhimed (yellow card) 88'; Majrashi (yellow card) 90'; Batna (yellow card) 90'; Boushal (yellow card) 90'	Stadium: King Abdullah Sport City Stadium; Attendance: 947; Referee: Abdullah Al-Shehri

=== King Cup ===
All times are local, AST (UTC+3).

17 December 2020 Round of 16	Al-Hilal	0–2	Al-Fateh	Riyadh
17:40	Jahfali (yellow card) 1'; Cuéllar (yellow card) 90+4'	Report	Al-Habib (yellow card) 43'; Batna 55'; Saâdane (yellow card) 84'; Al-Fuhaid (yellow card) 87'; Bendebka 88'; Al-Daheem (yellow card) 90+3'	Stadium: Prince Faisal bin Fahd Stadium; Attendance: 0 Referee: Turki Al-Khudhayr

16 March 2021 Quarter-finals	Al-Ittihad	1–2 (a.e.t.)	Al-Fateh	Mecca
20:45	Al-Malki (yellow card) 15'; Prijović (yellow card) 52'; Camara (yellow card) 65'; Abdulhamid (yellow card) 68' (yellow-red card) 75'; Hegazi 120'; Al-Muwallad (yellow card) 120+3'	Report	Bendebka (yellow card) 7' (yellow-red card) 90+2'; Al-Fuhaid (yellow card) 14'; Boushal (yellow card) 30'; Batna 113'; Majrashi 118'; Al-Zaqaan (yellow card) 119'	Stadium: King Abdul Aziz Stadium; Attendance: 0 Referee: Majed Al-Shamrani

4 April 2021 Semi-finals	Al-Taawoun	3–2	Al-Fateh	Buraidah
19:00	Assiri (yellow card) 11'; Kaku 25'; Tawamba 55'; Amissi 62'; Al-Zubaidi (yellow card) 69'; Sané (yellow card) 90'; Al-Mousa (yellow card) 90+6'	Report	Saâdane (yellow card) 42' te Vrede (yellow card) 51'; Majrashi 72'; Batna 74'; Al-Hassan (yellow card) 76'	Stadium: King Abdullah Sport City Stadium; Attendance: 0 Referee: Faisal Al-Blwi

== Statistics ==
=== Appearances ===
Last updated on 30 May 2021.

No.	Pos	Nat	Player	Total		Pro League		King Cup	
No.	Pos	Nat	Player	Apps	Goals	Apps	Goals	Apps	Goals
Goalkeepers
1	GK	(Saudi Arabia) KSA	Basil Al-Bahrani	1	0	1	0	0	0
34	GK	(Saudi Arabia) KSA	Mohammed Al-Burayh	0	0	0	0	0	0
35	GK	(Ukraine) UKR	Maksym Koval	32	0	29	0	3	0
Defenders
2	DF	(Saudi Arabia) KSA	Nawaf Boushal	32	2	27+2	2	3	0
3	DF	(Saudi Arabia) KSA	Mohammad Naji	16	0	7+7	0	0+2	0
4	DF	(Saudi Arabia) KSA	Saleh Al-Nashmi	11	0	3+8	0	0	0
5	DF	(Saudi Arabia) KSA	Fahad Al-Harbi	10	0	4+4	0	1+1	0
15	DF	(Saudi Arabia) KSA	Ziyad Al-Jari	0	0	0	0	0	0
23	DF	(Saudi Arabia) KSA	Abdullah Al-Yousef	12	0	4+7	0	0+1	0
24	DF	(Saudi Arabia) KSA	Ammar Al-Daheem	28	1	24+2	1	2	0
25	DF	(Saudi Arabia) KSA	Tawfiq Buhimed	32	1	26+3	1	3	0
87	DF	(Saudi Arabia) KSA	Qassem Lajami	6	1	5+1	1	0	0
Midfielders
10	MF	(Peru) PER	Christian Cueva	17	8	11+4	8	2	0
11	MF	(Morocco) MAR	Mourad Batna	29	9	25+1	6	3	3
12	MF	(Saudi Arabia) KSA	Majed Kanabah	12	0	5+5	0	1+1	0
14	MF	(Saudi Arabia) KSA	Mohammed Al-Fuhaid	30	0	27+1	0	2	0
16	MF	(Sudan) SDN	Mohammed Al-Dhaw	4	0	0+4	0	0	0
17	MF	(Morocco) MAR	Marwane Saâdane	29	0	25+1	0	3	0
18	MF	(Saudi Arabia) KSA	Mohammed Al-Saeed	25	0	10+13	0	1+1	0
20	MF	(Saudi Arabia) KSA	Mortadha Al-Khadrawi	0	0	0	0	0	0
26	MF	(Saudi Arabia) KSA	Ali Al-Zaqaan	30	5	19+8	5	0+3	0
28	MF	(Algeria) ALG	Sofiane Bendebka	29	10	27	9	2	1
36	MF	(Saudi Arabia) KSA	Abbas Al-Hassan	7	0	4+2	0	0+1	0
37	MF	(Saudi Arabia) KSA	Ali Al-Jassem	0	0	0	0	0	0
38	MF	(Saudi Arabia) KSA	Othman Al-Othman	1	0	0+1	0	0	0
77	MF	(Saudi Arabia) KSA	Hassan Al-Habib	23	0	7+13	0	2+1	0
Forwards
9	FW	(Suriname) SUR	Mitchell te Vrede	25	13	20+2	13	2+1	0
19	FW	(Saudi Arabia) KSA	Mohammed Majrashi	21	5	4+15	3	0+2	2
22	FW	(Algeria) ALG	Hillal Soudani	15	2	10+3	2	2	0
99	FW	(Saudi Arabia) KSA	Abdullah Al-Bladi	5	0	0+5	0	0	0
Player who made an appearance this season but have left the club
7	FW	(Saudi Arabia) KSA	Saqer Otaif	7	0	1+6	0	0	0
8	FW	(Serbia) SRB	Saša Jovanović	8	1	3+4	1	1	0
88	MF	(Norway) NOR	Gustav Wikheim	7	1	2+5	1	0	0

=== Goalscorers ===
Rank	No.	Pos	Nat	Name	Pro League	King Cup	Total
1	9	FW	(Netherlands)	Mitchell te Vrede	13	0	13
2	28	MF	(Algeria)	Sofiane Bendebka	9	1	10
3	11	MF	(Morocco)	Mourad Batna	6	3	9
4	10	MF	(Peru)	Christian Cueva	8	0	8
5	19	FW	(Saudi Arabia)	Mohammed Majrashi	3	2	5
5	26	MF	(Saudi Arabia)	Ali Al-Zaqaan	5	0	5
7	2	DF	(Saudi Arabia)	Nawaf Boushal	2	0	2
7	22	FW	(Algeria)	Hillal Soudani	2	0	2
9	8	FW	(Serbia)	Saša Jovanović	1	0	1
9	24	DF	(Saudi Arabia)	Ammar Al-Daheem	1	0	1
9	25	DF	(Saudi Arabia)	Tawfiq Buhimed	1	0	1
9	87	DF	(Saudi Arabia)	Qassem Lajami	1	0	1
9	88	MF	(Norway)	Gustav Wikheim	1	0	1
Own goal					2	0	2
Total					55	6	61

Last Updated: 30 May 2021

=== Assists ===
Rank	No.	Pos	Nat	Name	Pro League	King Cup	Total
1	10	MF	(Peru)	Christian Cueva	7	2	9
2	11	MF	(Morocco)	Mourad Batna	6	1	7
3	26	MF	(Saudi Arabia)	Ali Al-Zaqaan	3	1	4
4	28	MF	(Algeria)	Sofiane Bendebka	3	0	3
5	12	MF	(Saudi Arabia)	Majed Kanabah	1	1	2
5	14	MF	(Saudi Arabia)	Mohammed Al-Fuhaid	2	0	2
5	25	DF	(Saudi Arabia)	Tawfiq Buhimed	2	0	2
5	77	MF	(Saudi Arabia)	Hassan Al-Habib	2	0	2
9	8	FW	(Serbia)	Saša Jovanović	1	0	1
9	9	FW	(Netherlands)	Mitchell te Vrede	1	0	1
9	18	MF	(Saudi Arabia)	Mohammed Al-Saeed	1	0	1
9	19	FW	(Saudi Arabia)	Mohammed Majrashi	1	0	1
9	23	DF	(Saudi Arabia)	Abdullah Al-Yousef	1	0	1
9	88	MF	(Norway)	Gustav Wikheim	1	0	1
Total					32	5	37

Last Updated: 30 May 2021

=== Clean sheets ===
Rank	No.	Pos	Nat	Name	Pro League	King Cup	Total
1	35	GK	(Ukraine)	Maksym Koval	4	1	5
Total					4	1	5

Last Updated: 25 May 2021
