= 2022–23 Al-Fateh SC season =

Al-Fateh
2022–23 season
- President: Saad Al-Afaliq
- Manager: Georgios Donis
- Stadium: Prince Abdullah bin Jalawi Stadium
- SPL: 6th
- King Cup: Quarter-finals (knocked out by Al-Hilal)
- Top goalscorer: League: Firas Al-Buraikan (17 goals); All: Firas Al-Buraikan (18 goals)
- Highest home attendance: 17,631 (vs. Al-Nassr, 3 February 2023)
- Lowest home attendance: 2,929 (vs. Al-Taawoun, 27 August 2022)
- Average home league attendance: 10,786
- All statistics correct as of 31 May 2023.

The 2022–23 season was Al-Fateh's 14th consecutive season in the Pro League and their 65th year in existence. The club participated in the Pro League and the King Cup.

The season covered the period from 1 July 2022 to 30 June 2023.

== Players ==
=== Squad information ===
As of 1 February 2023

Note: Flags indicate national team as defined under FIFA eligibility rules; some limited exceptions apply. Players may hold more than one non-FIFA nationality.

No.	Pos.	Nation	Player
1	GK	SWE	Jacob Rinne
3	DF	KSA	Ziyad Al-Jari
4	DF	ESP	Fran Vélez
6	MF	BRA	Petros
7	MF	KSA	Ayman Al-Khulaif
8	MF	KSA	Housain Al-Mogahwi
9	FW	KSA	Firas Al-Buraikan
11	MF	MAR	Mourad Batna
14	MF	KSA	Mohammed Al-Fuhaid (captain)
15	MF	KSA	Hassan Al-Mohammed
16	MF	KSA	Nooh Al-Mousa
17	DF	MAR	Marwane Saâdane
18	MF	KSA	Mohammed Al-Saeed
19	MF	KSA	Khalid Al-Ghannam (on loan from Al-Nassr)
22	GK	KSA	Waleed Al-Enezi
24	DF	KSA	Ammar Al-Daheem

No.	Pos.	Nation	Player
25	DF	KSA	Tawfiq Buhimed (vice-captain)
26	GK	KSA	Mustafa Malayekah
27	DF	KSA	Ali Al-Zubaidi
28	MF	ALG	Sofiane Bendebka
29	FW	KSA	Ali Al-Masoud
33	GK	KSA	Ali Al-Shuhayb
34	DF	KSA	Meshal Al-Hamdan
37	MF	ESP	Cristian Tello
46	MF	KSA	Abbas Al-Hassan
77	FW	KSA	Ali Al-Jassem
83	DF	KSA	Salem Al-Najdi
87	DF	KSA	Qassem Lajami
88	MF	KSA	Othman Al-Othman
91	MF	FRA	Tristan Dingomé
94	MF	KSA	Abdullah Al-Enezi
99	FW	KSA	Hassan Al Salis

=== Out on loan ===
Note: Flags indicate national team as defined under FIFA eligibility rules; some limited exceptions apply. Players may hold more than one non-FIFA nationality.

No.	Pos.	Nation	Player
5	DF	KSA	Fahad Al-Harbi (at Al-Adalah until 30 June 2023)
10	MF	PER	Christian Cueva (at Alianza Lima until 30 June 2023)

No.	Pos.	Nation	Player
23	DF	KSA	Abdullah Al-Yousef (at Al-Batin until 30 June 2023)
—	MF	KSA	Hassan Al-Habib (at Al-Adalah until 30 June 2023)

== Transfers and loans ==
=== Transfers in ===
Entry date	Position	No.	Player	From club	Fee	Ref.
30 June 2022	MF	20	(Saudi Arabia) Murtadha Al-Khedhrawi	(Saudi Arabia) Hajer	End of loan	
30 June 2022	MF	–	(Saudi Arabia) Loay Al-Johani	(Saudi Arabia) Najran	End of loan	
1 July 2022	GK	1	(Sweden) Jacob Rinne	(Denmark) Aalborg	Free	
1 July 2022	MF	16	(Saudi Arabia) Nooh Al-Mousa	(Saudi Arabia) Al-Ahli	Free	
4 July 2022	DF	4	(Spain) Fran Vélez	(Greece) Panathinaikos	$860,000	
7 July 2022	MF	8	(Saudi Arabia) Housain Al-Mogahwi	(Saudi Arabia) Al-Ahli	Free	
11 July 2022	GK	26	(Saudi Arabia) Mustafa Malayekah	(Saudi Arabia) Al-Faisaly	Free	
31 July 2022	FW	99	(Saudi Arabia) Hassan Al Salis	(Saudi Arabia) Al-Ettifaq	Undisclosed	
1 August 2022	FW	20	(Peru) Alex Valera	(Peru) Universitario	$1,000,000	
12 August 2022	GK	22	(Saudi Arabia) Waleed Al-Enezi	(Saudi Arabia) Al-Nassr	Free	
25 January 2023	MF	37	(Spain) Cristian Tello	(United States) Los Angeles FC	Free	
6 February 2023	DF	91	(France) Tristan Dingomé	(France) Troyes	Free	

=== Loans in ===
Start date	End date	Position	No.	Player	From club	Fee	Ref.
28 January 2023	End of season	MF	19	(Saudi Arabia) Khalid Al-Ghannam	(Saudi Arabia) Al-Nassr	None	

=== Transfers out ===
Exit date	Position	No.	Player	To club	Fee	Ref.
30 June 2022	GK	22	(Saudi Arabia) Waleed Al-Enezi	(Saudi Arabia) Al-Nassr	End of loan	
30 June 2022	DF	20	(Saudi Arabia) Khalifah Al-Dawsari	(Saudi Arabia) Al-Hilal	End of loan	
1 July 2022	GK	35	(Ukraine) Maksym Koval		Released	
1 July 2022	FW	8	(Croatia) Ivan Santini	(Switzerland) FC Zürich	Free	
4 July 2022	MF	77	(Egypt) Ahmed El Geaidy		Released	
15 July 2022	MF	16	(Saudi Arabia) Munther Al-Nakhli	(Saudi Arabia) Al-Arabi	Free	
1 August 2022	GK	1	(Saudi Arabia) Basil Al-Bahrani	(Saudi Arabia) Al-Batin	Free	
5 August 2022	DF	4	(Saudi Arabia) Saleh Al-Nashmi	(Saudi Arabia) Al-Sahel	Free	
19 September 2022	DF	55	(Saudi Arabia) Lafi Al-Murki	(Saudi Arabia) Qilwah	Free	
21 September 2022	FW	–	(Saudi Arabia) Nawaf Al-Qarni	(Saudi Arabia) Qilwah	Free	
11 January 2023	FW	20	(Peru) Alex Valera	(Peru) Universitario	Free	
20 January 2023	DF	2	(Saudi Arabia) Nawaf Boushal	(Saudi Arabia) Al-Nassr	$4,260,000	
26 January 2023	MF	12	(Saudi Arabia) Majed Kanabah	(Saudi Arabia) Al-Shabab	Undisclosed	

=== Loans out ===
Start date	End date	Position	No.	Player	To club	Fee	Ref.
20 August 2022	End of season	MF	7	(Saudi Arabia) Hassan Al-Habib	(Saudi Arabia) Al-Adalah	None	
27 August 2022	End of season	DF	5	(Saudi Arabia) Fahad Al-Harbi	(Saudi Arabia) Al-Adalah	None	
8 January 2023	End of season	DF	23	(Saudi Arabia) Abdullah Al-Yousef	(Saudi Arabia) Al-Batin	None	
7 March 2023	End of season	MF	10	(Peru) Christian Cueva	(Peru) Alianza Lima	None	

== Pre-season ==
2 August 2022 Friendly	Al-Fateh (Saudi Arabia)	3–1	(Slovenia) NK Radomlje	Radomlje, Slovenia
19:00 CEST	Bendebka 14'; Al-Khulaif 22'; Al-Habib 59'	Report		Stadium: Sports park Radomlje

5 August 2022 Friendly	Al-Fateh (Saudi Arabia)	0–2	(United Arab Emirates) Al-Nasr	Slovenia
17:00 CEST		Report

10 August 2022 Friendly	Al-Fateh (Saudi Arabia)	2–0	(Slovenia) NK Tabor Sežana	Brdo, Slovenia
17:30 CEST	Cueva; Valera	Report		Stadium: National Football Center Brdo

15 August 2022 Global Tour for Peace	Al-Fateh (Saudi Arabia)	0–5	(Ukraine) Shakhtar Donetsk	Brdo, Slovenia
11:00 CEST		Report	Sikan 7', 37'; Vakula 24'; Kryvtsov 34'; Traoré 80'	Stadium: National Football Center Brdo

15 August 2022 Global Tour for Peace	Al-Fateh (Saudi Arabia)	3–1	(Ukraine) Shakhtar Donetsk	Brdo, Slovenia
18:00 CEST	Cueva 38'; Al-Harbi 85'; Valera 87'	Report	Mudryk 29'	Stadium: National Football Center Brdo

== Competitions ==
=== Overview ===
Competition	Record							
Competition	G	W	D	L	GF	GA	GD	Win %
Pro League	30	13	4	13	48	43	+5	43.33
King Cup	2	0	1	1	3	5	−2	0.00
Total	32	13	5	14	51	48	+3	40.63

Updated to match played 31 May 2023
Source: Competitions

=== Pro League ===
==== League table ====
Pos	Team	Pld	W	D	L	GF	GA	GD	Pts
4	Al-Shabab	30	17	5	8	57	33	+24	56
5	Al-Taawoun	30	16	7	7	46	34	+12	55
6	Al-Fateh	30	13	4	13	48	43	+5	43
7	Al-Ettifaq	30	10	7	13	28	36	−8	37
8	Damac	30	9	9	12	33	43	−10	36

Updated to match(es) played on 31 May 2023. Source: SPL
Rules for classification: 1) Points; 2) Head-to-head points; 3) Head-to-head goal difference; 4) Total goal difference; 5) Total goals scored; 6) Fair-play points (Note: Head-to-head record is used only after all the matches between the teams in question have been played).

==== Results summary ====
Overall								Home						Away					
Pld	W	D	L	GF	GA	GD	Pts	W	D	L	GF	GA	GD	W	D	L	GF	GA	GD
30	13	4	13	48	43	+5	43	6	3	6	23	22	+1	7	1	7	25	21	+4

Last updated: 31 May 2023.
Source: spl.com.sa

==== Results by round ====
Round	1	2	3	4	5	6	7	8	9	10	11	12	13	14	15	16	17	18	19	20	21	22	23	24	25	26	27	28	29	30
Ground	H	A	H	A	H	A	A	H	A	H	H	A	H	A	H	A	H	A	H	A	H	H	A	H	A	A	H	A	H	A
Result	L	W	L	L	W	L	W	W	W	W	L	L	W	L	D	W	W	W	L	D	L	W	W	D	L	L	L	W	D	L
Position	13	7	9	11	9	9	9	8	9	8	9	10	7	8	6	6	6	6	6	6	6	6	5	5	6	6	6	6	6	6

Updated to match(es) played on 31 May 2023. Source: spl.com.sa
A = Away; H = Home; W = Win; D = Draw; L = Loss

==== Matches ====
All times are local, AST (UTC+3).

Win Draw Loss Postponed

27 August 2022 1	Al-Fateh	0–2	Al-Taawoun	Al-Hasa
18:45	Batna (yellow card) 82'; Buhimed (yellow card) 86'; Vélez (yellow card) 90+3'	Report	Tawamba 45+3'; Al-Rashidi 57'; El Mahdioui (yellow card) 61'; Kadesh (yellow card) 78'; Al-Nabit (yellow card) 88'	Stadium: Prince Abdullah bin Jalawi Stadium; Attendance: 2,929; Referee: Khaled Al-Teris

31 August 2022 2	Al-Batin	0–5	Al-Fateh	Hafar al-Batin
18:55	Campaña (yellow card) 22' (yellow-red card) 22'; Al-Hurayji (yellow card) 77'	Report	Saâdane 17'; Batna 41', 62'; Bendebka (yellow card) 45'; Al-Fuhaid (yellow card) 47'; Petros 70'; Al-Buraikan 90+2'	Stadium: Al-Batin Club Stadium; Attendance: 3,984; Referee: Ahmed Al-Rumaikhani

4 September 2022 3	Al-Fateh	0–1	Al-Hilal	Al-Hasa
18:35		Report	Vietto 11'; N. Al-Dawsari (yellow card) 22'; Cuéllar (yellow card) 71'; Michael (yellow card) 89'	Stadium: Prince Abdullah bin Jalawi Stadium; Attendance: 15,483; Referee: Mohammed Al-Hoaish

14 September 2022 4	Al-Tai	1–0	Al-Fateh	Ha'il
18:55	Dener 47'; Fai (yellow card) 79'; Al-Qumairi (yellow card) 87'	Report	Petros (yellow card) 83'	Stadium: Prince Abdul Aziz bin Musa'ed Stadium; Attendance: 7,962; Referee: Abdullah Al-Harbi

2 October 2022 5	Al-Fateh	3–0	Abha	Al-Hasa
21:00	Buhimed 5'; Al-Buraikan 61'; Batna (yellow card) 80'; Al-Khulaif 84'	Report		Stadium: Prince Abdullah bin Jalawi Stadium; Attendance: 3,705; Referee: Sami Al-Jires

7 October 2022 6	Al-Ittihad	3–1	Al-Fateh	Jeddah
21:00	Romarinho 32'; Al-Shamrani (yellow card) 45+3'; Coronado (yellow card) 49', (goal) 86'; Hamdallah 69'; Grohe (yellow card) 90'	Report	Vélez (yellow card) 32'; Al-Fuhaid (yellow card) 45+5'; Kanabah 61'	Stadium: King Abdullah Sports City; Attendance: 32,374; Referee: Georgi Kabakov (Bulgaria)

11 October 2022 7	Al-Khaleej	1–2	Al-Fateh	Dammam
20:30	Riascos (yellow card) 27'; Al-Khabrani (yellow card) 86'; Cikalleshi 90+2' (pen.); Al Abbas (yellow card) 90+3'	Report	Al-Buraikan 15'; Batna (yellow card) 90+1'; Saâdane 90+11'	Stadium: Prince Mohamed bin Fahd Stadium; Attendance: 1,953; Referee: Ahmed Al-Rumaikhani

15 October 2022 8	Al-Fateh	1–0	Al-Raed	Al-Hasa
20:30	Al-Buraikan 10'; Buhimed (red card) 45'; Saâdane (yellow card) 65'	Report	Al-Qahtani (yellow card) 52'; Al-Shammeri (yellow card) 89'	Stadium: Prince Abdullah bin Jalawi Stadium; Attendance: 11,972; Referee: Mamdouh Al Shahdan

26 December 2022 10	Al-Fateh	4–1	Al-Shabab	Al-Hasa
15:30	Bendebka 41' (pen.); Kanabah 51'; Al-Khulaif 55'; Vélez (yellow card) 74'; Batna 90+7' (pen.)	Report	Santos (yellow card) 45+2'; Mina 49', (yellow card) 87'; Al-Tambakti (yellow card) 69'; Bahebri (yellow card) 77'	Stadium: Prince Abdullah bin Jalawi Stadium; Attendance: 7,362; Referee: Mohammed Al-Hoaish

30 December 2022 11	Al-Fateh	0–2	Al-Fayha	Al-Hasa
15:30	Bendebka (yellow card) 19'	Report	Mandash (yellow card) 15'; Nwakaeme (yellow card) 40', (goal) 77'; Ruiz (yellow card) 45+2'; Zidan 90+8'	Stadium: Prince Abdullah bin Jalawi Stadium; Attendance: 12,279; Referee: Sultan Al-Harbi

6 January 2023 12	Al-Adalah	2–1	Al-Fateh	Al-Hasa
18:00	Al Haydar 51'; Plata 64'; Edson (yellow card) 90+10'	Report	Vélez (yellow card) 60'; Petros (yellow card) 71'; Al-Buraikan 72', (yellow card) 90+9'	Stadium: Prince Abdullah bin Jalawi Stadium; Attendance: 9,428; Referee: Majed Al-Shamrani

12 January 2023 13	Al-Fateh	2–0	Al-Ettifaq	Al-Hasa
15:30	Kanabah 4'; Al-Daheem (yellow card) 45+6'; Saâdane 59' (pen.)	Report	Hawsawi (red card) 40'; Al-Mowalad (yellow card) 57'	Stadium: Prince Abdullah bin Jalawi Stadium; Attendance: 12,743; Referee: Faisal Al-Blwi

20 January 2023 14	Damac	3–1	Al-Fateh	Khamis Mushait
18:00	Soudani (yellow card) 39', (goal) 72'; Hawsawi (yellow card) 75'; Duarte 83'; Zeghba (yellow card) 90+9'; Antolić 90+12'	Report	Al-Zubaidi 10'; Petros (yellow card) 41'; Al-Buraikan (yellow card) 45+5'; Al Salis (yellow card) 79'	Stadium: Damac Club Stadium; Attendance: 2,787; Referee: Mohammed Al-Esmaiel

27 January 2023 9	Al-Wehda	0–2	Al-Fateh	Mecca
20:30	Bakshween (yellow card) 40'; Duarte (yellow card) 64' (yellow-red card) 67'	Report	Al-Buraikan 25'; Batna (yellow card) 48', (goal) 90+3'; Buhimed (yellow card) 51'; Al-Khulaif (yellow card) 62'; Saâdane (yellow card) 64'; Al-Fuhaid (yellow card) 69'; Al-Zubaidi (yellow card) 87'	Stadium: King Abdul Aziz Stadium; Attendance: 2,455; Referee: Abdullah Al-Harbi

3 February 2023 15	Al-Fateh	2–2	Al-Nassr	Al-Hasa
18:00	Tello 12'; Bendebka 58', (yellow card) 63'; Al-Daheem (yellow card) 90'	Report	Talisca 42', (red card) 90+5'; Lajami (yellow card) 78'; Ronaldo (yellow card) 90', (goal) 90+3' (pen.)	Stadium: Prince Abdullah bin Jalawi Stadium; Attendance: 17,631; Referee: Fernando Rapallini (Argentina)

9 February 2023 16	Al-Taawoun	1–2	Al-Fateh	Buraidah
18:00	Kaku 21' (pen.); Al-Nabit (yellow card) 37'	Report	Al-Daheem (yellow card) 43'; Al-Buraikan 47', 89'	Stadium: King Abdullah Sport City Stadium; Attendance: 5,595; Referee: Khaled Al-Teris

18 February 2023 17	Al-Fateh	2–0	Al-Batin	Al-Hasa
16:00	Saâdane 43' (pen.); Tello (yellow card) 57', (goal) 68'	Report	Y. Al-Shammari (yellow card) 57'	Stadium: Prince Abdullah bin Jalawi Stadium; Attendance: 11,938; Referee: Mohammed Al-Harbi

2 March 2023 19	Al-Fateh	2–3	Al-Tai	Al-Hasa
16:00	Al-Buraikan 7', 70'; Al-Fuhaid (yellow card) 55'	Report	Musona 17', 90+2'; Mbenza 29'; Semedo (yellow card) 45+1'	Stadium: Prince Abdullah bin Jalawi Stadium; Attendance: 12,271; Referee: Sultan Okairy

6 March 2023 18	Al-Hilal	1–2	Al-Fateh	Riyadh
20:30	Al-Hamdan (yellow card) 19'; Al-Breik (yellow card) 31'; Al-Bulaihi (yellow card) 45'; Al-Shehri 90+4'	Report	Al-Khulaif (yellow card) 22'; Tello 39'; Al-Ghannam 80'; Petros (yellow card) 88'; Al-Mousa (yellow card) 90+7'	Stadium: Prince Faisal bin Fahd Stadium; Attendance: 13,815; Referee: Artur Soares Dias (Portugal)

10 March 2023 20	Abha	2–2	Al-Fateh	Abha
16:00	Al-Zori 11'; Caicedo 20'; Al-Amri (yellow card) 80'	Report	Batna 50' (pen.), 90+6' (pen.)	Stadium: Prince Sultan bin Abdul Aziz Stadium; Attendance: 725; Referee: Mohammed Al-Beredi

18 March 2023 21	Al-Fateh	1–5	Al-Ittihad	Al-Hasa
16:00	Al-Fuhaid (yellow card) 10'; Batna 41', (yellow card) 62'; Petros (yellow card) 50'	Report	Hamdallah 7', 50' (pen.), 90+8'; Costa (yellow card) 24'; Coronado (yellow card) 43', (goal) 90'; Sharahili 59'; Al-Olayan (yellow card) 88'	Stadium: Prince Abdullah bin Jalawi Stadium; Attendance: 14,695; Referee: Andrés Matonte (Uruguay)

6 April 2023 22	Al-Fateh	2–0	Al-Khaleej	Al-Hasa
22:00	Vélez (yellow card) 28'; Batna 65'; Tello (yellow card) 69'; Al-Buraikan (yellow card) 89', (goal) 90+2'	Report	Martins (yellow card) 35'; Al-Khabrani (yellow card) 68'; Al Abbas (yellow card) 90'	Stadium: Prince Abdullah bin Jalawi Stadium; Attendance: 9,362; Referee: Abdulsamad Bakri

10 April 2023 23	Al-Raed	0–3	Al-Fateh	Buraidah
22:00	Al-Farhan (yellow card) 23'; Pablo (red card) 43'	Report	Al-Najdi (yellow card) 27'; Batna 37', 53'; Al-Buraikan 45+8'; Al-Jari (yellow card) 49'; Bendebka (yellow card) 77'	Stadium: King Abdullah Sport City Stadium; Attendance: 4,531; Referee: Sultan Al-Harbi

28 April 2023 24	Al-Fateh	1–1	Al-Wehda	Al-Hasa
19:00	Tello 13'	Report	Fajr 63' (pen.), (yellow card) 67'; Al-Akouz (yellow card) 79' (yellow-red card) 89'; Al Hejji (yellow card) 80'; Beauguel (yellow card) 90+2'	Stadium: Prince Abdullah bin Jalawi Stadium; Attendance: 9,257; Referee: Khaled Al-Teris

3 May 2023 25	Al-Shabab	1–0	Al-Fateh	Riyadh
21:30	Krychowiak (yellow card) 45+4'; Banega 52'; Mina (yellow card) 60'; Kim Seung-gyu (yellow card) 89'; Al-Sibyani (yellow card) 90+3'	Report	Lajami (yellow card) 51' (yellow-red card) 90+3'; Petros (yellow card) 56'	Stadium: Prince Faisal bin Fahd Stadium; Attendance: 2,957; Referee: Andris Treimanis (Latvia)

9 May 2023 26	Al-Fayha	3–0	Al-Fateh	Al Majma'ah
19:00	Nwakaeme 38', (yellow card) 45+1'; Ruiz 45+3'; Nasser (yellow card) 60'; Trajkovski 90+5'	Report	Tello (yellow card) 90'	Stadium: Al Majma'ah Sports City; Attendance: 2,098; Referee: Sami Al-Jires

15 May 2023 27	Al-Fateh	2–4	Al-Adalah	Al-Hasa
21:30	Petros (yellow card) 64'; Al-Buraikan 65', 90+10'; Al-Daheem (yellow card) 75'	Report	Eugénio 25'; Lenis 32'; Al-Harbi (yellow card) 44'; Gonzáles 59'; Al-Oufi 61'	Stadium: Prince Abdullah bin Jalawi Stadium; Attendance: 12,834; Referee: Khaled Al-Teris

22 May 2023 28	Al-Ettifaq	0–4	Al-Fateh	Dammam
19:00	Hawsawi (red card) 5'; Al-Mousa (yellow card) 42' (yellow-red card) 64'; Niakaté (yellow card) 51'	Report	Al-Buraikan 12', 40' (pen.); Buhimed (yellow card) 29'; Al-Ghannam 73', 81'	Stadium: Prince Mohamed bin Fahd Stadium; Attendance: 3,574; Referee: Raed Al-Zahrani

27 May 2023 29	Al-Fateh	1–1	Damac	Al-Hasa
21:00	Al-Buraikan 29'; Petros (yellow card) 64'; Buhimed (yellow card) 74'	Report	Maher (yellow card) 23'; Nono 71'; Zeghba (yellow card) 82'; Bedrane (yellow card) 86'; Al-Najjar (yellow card) 88'	Stadium: Prince Abdullah bin Jalawi Stadium; Attendance: 7,324; Referee: Fareeh Al-Jaloud

31 May 2023 30	Al-Nassr	3–0	Al-Fateh	Riyadh
21:00	Talisca 4', 66'; Maran 72'; Madu (yellow card) 74'	Report	Al-Jari (yellow card) 49'	Stadium: Al-Awwal Park; Attendance: 12,203; Referee: Artur Soares Dias (Portugal)

=== King Cup ===
All times are local, AST (UTC+3).

22 December 2022 Round of 16	Al-Fateh	2–2 (a.e.t.) (7–6 p)	Al-Tai	Al-Hasa
18:00	Batna 12'; Boushal (yellow card) 67'; Buhimed (yellow card) 90+10'; Al Salis 112'	Report	Martínez (yellow card) 9'; Dener (yellow card) 61'; Musona 65'; Qassem (yellow card) 77'; Majrashi (yellow card) 90+12'; Al-Jubairi (yellow card) 105+4'; Al Salis 119' (o.g.)	Stadium: Prince Abdullah bin Jalawi Stadium; Attendance: 608; Referee: Abdullah Al-Harbi
	Penalties
	Saâdane (penalty scored); Buhimed (penalty scored); Al-Buraikan (penalty scored); Valera (penalty scored); Al Salis (penalty scored); Vélez (penalty scored); Boushal (penalty scored)		(penalty scored) Dener; (penalty scored) Mbenza; (penalty scored) Semedo; (penalty scored) Al-Harabi; (penalty scored) Al-Jubairi; (penalty scored) Martínez; (penalty missed) Harzan

14 March 2023 Quarter-finals	Al-Hilal	3–1	Al-Fateh	Riyadh
21:00	Kanno 17' (pen.); Al-Bulaihi (yellow card) 26' (yellow-red card) 67'; Michael 48'; Cuéllar (yellow card) 76'; Ighalo 84'	Report	Al-Najdi (yellow card) 12'; Al-Buraikan 27'; Vélez (yellow card) 35'; Saâdane (yellow card) 76'	Stadium: Prince Faisal bin Fahd Stadium; Attendance: 12,023; Referee: Radu Petrescu (Romania)

== Statistics ==
=== Appearances ===
Last updated on 31 May 2023.

No.	Pos	Nat	Player	Total		Pro League		King Cup	
No.	Pos	Nat	Player	Apps	Goals	Apps	Goals	Apps	Goals
Goalkeepers
1	GK	(Sweden) SWE	Jacob Rinne	29	0	27	0	2	0
22	GK	(Saudi Arabia) KSA	Waleed Al-Enezi	0	0	0	0	0	0
26	GK	(Saudi Arabia) KSA	Mustafa Malayekah	4	0	3+1	0	0	0
33	GK	(Saudi Arabia) KSA	Ali Al-Shuhayb	0	0	0	0	0	0
40	GK	(Saudi Arabia) KSA	Sattam Al-Subaie	0	0	0	0	0	0
Defenders
3	DF	(Saudi Arabia) KSA	Ziyad Al-Jari	17	0	9+8	0	0	0
4	DF	(Spain) ESP	Fran Vélez	23	0	21	0	2	0
17	DF	(Morocco) MAR	Marwane Saâdane	26	4	24	4	2	0
24	DF	(Saudi Arabia) KSA	Ammar Al-Daheem	12	0	8+4	0	0	0
25	DF	(Saudi Arabia) KSA	Tawfiq Buhimed	26	1	21+4	1	0+1	0
27	DF	(Saudi Arabia) KSA	Ali Al-Zubaidi	18	1	12+5	1	1	0
34	DF	(Saudi Arabia) KSA	Meshal Al-Hamdan	1	0	0+1	0	0	0
42	DF	(Saudi Arabia) KSA	Ahmed Al-Jelidan	4	0	2+2	0	0	0
83	DF	(Saudi Arabia) KSA	Salem Al-Najdi	19	0	6+11	0	2	0
87	DF	(Saudi Arabia) KSA	Qassem Lajami	8	0	4+4	0	0	0
Midfielders
6	MF	(Brazil) BRA	Petros	30	1	28	1	2	0
7	MF	(Saudi Arabia) KSA	Ayman Al-Khulaif	18	2	10+8	2	0	0
8	MF	(Saudi Arabia) KSA	Housain Al-Mogahwi	12	0	3+8	0	1	0
11	MF	(Morocco) MAR	Mourad Batna	27	11	24+1	10	2	1
14	MF	(Saudi Arabia) KSA	Mohammed Al-Fuhaid	26	0	16+9	0	1	0
15	MF	(Saudi Arabia) KSA	Hassan Al-Mohammed	1	0	0+1	0	0	0
16	MF	(Saudi Arabia) KSA	Nooh Al-Mousa	12	0	2+8	0	0+2	0
18	MF	(Saudi Arabia) KSA	Mohammed Al-Saeed	6	0	3+3	0	0	0
19	MF	(Saudi Arabia) KSA	Khalid Al-Ghannam	16	3	6+9	3	0+1	0
28	MF	(Algeria) ALG	Sofiane Bendebka	28	2	24+2	2	2	0
35	MF	(Saudi Arabia) KSA	Faisal Al-Abdulwahed	0	0	0	0	0	0
37	MF	(Spain) ESP	Cristian Tello	16	4	15	4	1	0
88	MF	(Saudi Arabia) KSA	Othman Al-Othman	5	0	2+3	0	0	0
91	MF	(France) FRA	Tristan Dingomé	8	0	4+4	0	0	0
94	MF	(Saudi Arabia) KSA	Abdullah Al-Enezi	5	0	0+5	0	0	0
Forwards
9	FW	(Saudi Arabia) KSA	Firas al-Buraikan	32	18	24+6	17	2	1
29	FW	(Saudi Arabia) KSA	Ali Al-Masoud	0	0	0	0	0	0
49	FW	(Saudi Arabia) KSA	Saad Al-Shurafa	2	0	0+2	0	0	0
77	FW	(Saudi Arabia) KSA	Ali Al-Jassem	5	0	1+4	0	0	0
99	FW	(Saudi Arabia) KSA	Hassan Al Salis	10	1	1+7	0	0+2	1
Players sent out on loan this season
10	MF	(Peru) PER	Christian Cueva	9	0	8+1	0	0	0
23	DF	(Saudi Arabia) KSA	Abdullah Al-Yousef	0	0	0	0	0	0
Player who made an appearance this season but have left the club
2	DF	(Saudi Arabia) KSA	Nawaf Boushal	12	0	11	0	1	0
12	MF	(Saudi Arabia) KSA	Majed Kanabah	13	3	8+4	3	1	0
20	FW	(Peru) PER	Alex Valera	6	0	3+2	0	0+1	0

=== Goalscorers ===
Rank	No.	Pos	Nat	Name	Pro League	King Cup	Total
1	9	FW	(Saudi Arabia)	Firas al-Buraikan	17	1	18
2	11	MF	(Morocco)	Mourad Batna	10	1	11
3	17	DF	(Morocco)	Marwane Saâdane	4	0	4
3	37	MF	(Spain)	Cristian Tello	4	0	4
5	12	MF	(Saudi Arabia)	Majed Kanabah	3	0	3
5	19	MF	(Saudi Arabia)	Khalid Al-Ghannam	3	0	3
7	7	MF	(Saudi Arabia)	Ayman Al-Khulaif	2	0	2
7	28	MF	(Algeria)	Sofiane Bendebka	2	0	2
9	6	MF	(Brazil)	Petros	1	0	1
9	25	DF	(Saudi Arabia)	Tawfiq Buhimed	1	0	1
9	27	DF	(Saudi Arabia)	Ali Al-Zubaidi	1	0	1
9	99	FW	(Saudi Arabia)	Hassan Al Salis	0	1	1
Own goal					0	0	0
Total					48	3	51

Last Updated: 27 May 2023

=== Assists ===
Rank	No.	Pos	Nat	Name	Pro League	King Cup	Total
1	11	MF	(Morocco)	Mourad Batna	7	1	8
2	28	MF	(Algeria)	Sofiane Bendebka	6	0	6
3	9	FW	(Saudi Arabia)	Firas al-Buraikan	4	0	4
3	37	MF	(Spain)	Cristian Tello	4	0	4
5	6	MF	(Brazil)	Petros	2	1	3
5	10	MF	(Peru)	Christian Cueva	3	0	3
7	19	MF	(Saudi Arabia)	Khalid Al-Ghannam	2	0	2
8	1	GK	(Sweden)	Jacob Rinne	1	0	1
8	4	DF	(Spain)	Fran Vélez	1	0	1
8	7	MF	(Saudi Arabia)	Ayman Al-Khulaif	1	0	1
8	17	DF	(Morocco)	Marwane Saâdane	1	0	1
8	25	DF	(Saudi Arabia)	Tawfiq Buhimed	1	0	1
8	34	DF	(Saudi Arabia)	Meshal Al-Hamdan	1	0	1
8	77	FW	(Saudi Arabia)	Ali Al-Jassem	1	0	1
8	83	DF	(Saudi Arabia)	Salem Al-Najdi	1	0	1
Total					36	2	38

Last Updated: 27 May 2023

=== Clean sheets ===
Rank	No.	Pos	Nat	Name	Pro League	King Cup	Total
1	1	GK	(Sweden)	Jacob Rinne	8	0	8
2	26	GK	(Saudi Arabia)	Mustafa Malayekah	1	0	1
Total					9	0	9

Last Updated: 22 May 2023
