= 2021–22 Saudi Pro League =

Saudi Pro League
- Season: 2021–22
- Dates: 11 August 2021 – 27 June 2022
- Champions: Al-Hilal (18th title)
- Relegated: Al-Faisaly; Al-Ahli; Al-Hazem
- AFC Champions League: Al-Hilal; Al-Fayha
- Arab Club Champions Cup: Al-Hilal; Al-Ittihad; Al-Nassr; Al-Shabab
- Matches: 240
- Goals: 637 (2.65 per match)
- Top goalscorer: Odion Ighalo (24 goals)
- Biggest home win: Al-Ittihad 6–1 Abha (11 September 2021); Al-Hilal 5–0 Al-Shabab (17 February 2022)
- Biggest away win: Al-Tai 0–4 Al-Hilal (11 January 2022); Abha 0–4 Al-Ittihad (6 February 2022)
- Highest scoring: Al-Fateh 5–5 Damac (25 November 2021)
- Longest winning run: Al-Ittihad (10 matches)
- Longest unbeaten run: Al-Shabab (17 matches)
- Longest winless run: Al-Hazem (11 matches)
- Longest losing run: Al-Hazem (7 matches)
- Highest attendance: 58,755; Al-Ittihad 1–3 Al-Hilal (23 May 2022)
- Lowest attendance: 0 Al-Ittihad 3–0 Al-Nassr (11 February 2022); 0 Al-Nassr 1–0 Al-Fayha (17 March 2022); 0 Al-Shabab 1–0 Al-Faisaly (12 May 2022)
- Total attendance: 1,868,679
- Average attendance: 7,885
- All statistics correct as of 27 June 2022.

The 2021–22 Saudi Pro League was the 47th edition of the top-tier Saudi football league, established in 1974, and the 14th edition since it was rebranded as the Saudi Pro League in 2008, Fixtures for the 2021–22 season were announced on 18 July 2021.

Al-Hilal were the two-time defending champions after winning their 17th title last season. Al-Fayha, Al-Hazem, and Al-Tai join as the three promoted clubs from the 2020–21 MS League. They replace Al-Ain, Al-Qadsiah, and Al-Wehda who were relegated to the 2021–22 MS League.

On 27 June, Al-Hilal secured their eighteenth league title in the final matchday following a 2–1 home win against Al-Faisaly. It was also the club's third consecutive title and fifth in the last six seasons. Al-Hazem were the first team to be relegated following a 5–2 defeat away to Al-Ettifaq on 21 May. In the final matchday, both Al-Faisaly and Al-Ahli were relegated following a defeat to Al-Hilal and a draw with Al-Shabab respectively.

== Overview ==
=== Sponsorship ===
On 8 August 2021, the Saudi Professional League announced that they had signed a sponsorship deal with real estate company Roshn. On 9 August 2021, the Saudi FF signed a sponsorship deal with Chinese tech company Lenovo to become the official technology partner of all Saudi football competitions.

=== Changes ===
On 8 August 2021, Ministry of Sports announced that they had increased the capacity limit from 40% to 60% in all stadiums. It was also announced that children under 12 wouldn't be allowed to attend matches and that the attendance would be limited to those who are fully vaccinated.

== Teams ==
Locations of teams in the 2021–22 Saudi Professional League

Sixteen teams will compete in the league – the top thirteen teams from the previous season and the three teams promoted from the MS League.

Teams who were promoted to the Pro League

The first club to be promoted was Al-Hazem, who were promoted following a 4–2 away win against Al-Sahel on 20 April 2021. Al-Hazem will play in the top flight of Saudi football after a season's absence. Al-Hazem were crowned champions following a 1–0 away win against Hajer on 21 May 2021.

The second club to be promoted was Al-Fayha, following a 0–0 home draw with Al-Tai on 20 May 2021. Al-Fayha will play in the top flight of Saudi football after a season's absence.

The third and final club to be promoted was Al-Tai who were promoted on the final matchday following a 2–0 away win over Arar. Al-Tai will play in the top flight of Saudi football for the first time since the 2007–08 season.

Teams who were relegated to the MS League

The first club to be relegated was Al-Ain, who were relegated after only a year in the top flight following a 2–0 defeat away to Al-Nassr on 14 May 2021.

In the final matchday, both Al-Qadsiah and Al-Wehda were relegated following a draw with Abha and a loss against Al-Shabab respectively. Al-Qadsiah were relegated after only a year in the top flight while Al-Wehda were relegated after three years in the top flight.

=== Stadiums ===
Note: Table lists in alphabetical order.

Team	Location	Stadium	Capacity
Abha	Abha	Prince Sultan bin Abdul Aziz Stadium	20,000
Al-Ahli	Jeddah	King Abdullah Sports City; Prince Abdullah Al-Faisal Stadium	62,345; 27,000
Al-Batin	Hafar al-Batin	Al-Batin Club Stadium	6,000
Al-Ettifaq	Dammam	Prince Mohamed bin Fahd Stadium	35,000
Al-Faisaly	Harmah	Al Majma'ah Sports City (Al Majma'ah)	7,000
Al-Fateh	Al-Hasa	Prince Abdullah bin Jalawi Stadium	26,000
Al-Fayha	Al Majma'ah	Al Majma'ah Sports City	7,000
Al-Hazem	Ar Rass	Al-Hazem Club Stadium	8,000
Al-Hilal	Riyadh	King Fahd International Stadium; Prince Faisal bin Fahd Stadium	62,685; 22,500
Al-Ittihad	Jeddah	King Abdullah Sports City; Prince Abdullah Al-Faisal Stadium	62,345; 27,000
Al-Nassr	Riyadh	Mrsool Park	25,000
Al-Raed	Buraidah	King Abdullah Sport City Stadium	25,000
Al-Shabab	Riyadh	King Fahd International Stadium; Prince Faisal bin Fahd Stadium	62,685; 22,500
Al-Taawoun	Buraidah	King Abdullah Sport City Stadium	25,000
Al-Tai	Ha'il	Prince Abdul Aziz bin Musa'ed Stadium	12,000
Damac	Khamis Mushait	Prince Sultan bin Abdul Aziz Stadium (Abha)	20,000

=== Personnel and kits ===
Team	Manager	Captain	Kit manufacturer	Shirt sponsor
Abha	(Slovakia) Martin Ševela	(Saudi Arabia) Karam Barnawi	Offside	Al-Dakheel Oud, Yelo, Mezaj Maghribi^{1}, Hayat National Hospital^{1}, The Burger's Origin^{2}, Furn Al-Dhayaa^{2}, X Antra^{3}
Al-Ahli	(Uruguay) Robert Siboldi	(Saudi Arabia) Yasser Al-Mosailem	Xtep	MG Cars, Boga Super Foods^{1}, Dorrah for Real Estate^{1}, Saudi German Hospital^{2}
Al-Batin	(Croatia) Alen Horvat	(Saudi Arabia) Mazyad Freeh	Skillano	Al-Odhaib Company, Traof, AlNadeg^{1}, ARASCO^{2}
Al-Ettifaq	(France) Patrice Carteron	(Algeria) Raïs M'Bolhi	adidas	Al-Dakheel Oud, Kammelna^{1}, Saudi German Hospital^{1}, 42 Group^{2}, Shgardi^{2}, Jana Center^{3}
Al-Faisaly	(Greece) Marinos Ouzounidis	(Brazil) Igor Rossi	adidas	ALDREES, Gree Electric, Roco^{1}, Mr Mandoob^{2}, UPS^{2}
Al-Fateh	(Greece) Georgios Donis	(Saudi Arabia) Mohammed Al-Fuhaid	Offside	Kia Motors, Al-Jabr Finance, Fuschia, Al Kifah Holding^{1}, Almoosa Hospital^{1}, B-Care^{2}
Al-Fayha	(Serbia) Vuk Rašović	(Saudi Arabia) Sami Al-Khaibari	Puma	Al-Romaih Investment, Brave, Abdal^{1}, Aromatic Families^{1}, Hayat Water^{2}, Sky Ways^{2}, Tasooma^{3}
Al-Hazem	(Netherlands) Roel Coumans	(Saudi Arabia) Khaled Al-Barakah	S Team	Arabica Star, Point^{1}, Superano^{1}, Asal Al-Barri^{2}, Qaid^{2}, Two Mark^{3}
Al-Hilal	(Argentina) Ramón Díaz	(Saudi Arabia) Salman Al-Faraj	S Team	EMAAR, Jahez, Tawuniya^{1}, Floward^{2}, Shawarmer^{2}
Al-Ittihad	(Romania) Cosmin Contra	(Brazil) Marcelo Grohe	Erreà	DARCO, Emkan^{1}, Bolt^{2}, Yelo^{2}
Al-Nassr	(Argentina) Miguel Ángel Russo	(Saudi Arabia) Abdullah Madu	Victory	Lebara, Shurfah, ToYou^{1}, Harrys Pizza^{2}
Al-Raed	(Saudi Arabia) Yousef Al-Ghadeer	(Saudi Arabia) Sultan Al-Farhan	Challenge	Shawahe, Yelo, Aldakheel Oud^{1}, Arabica Star^{1}, B-Care^{2}, Qaid^{2}
Al-Shabab	(Romania) Marius Șumudică	(Argentina) Éver Banega	Offside	Almozaini, Bolt, Half Million, Prestige^{1}, Takenda^{1}, Azom^{2}, TikTok^{2}, Veloce^{3}
Al-Taawoun	(Saudi Arabia) Mohammed Al-Abdali	(Brazil) Cássio	Skillano	Fuchs, Nice One, Alsaif Gallery^{1}, Hayat National Hospital^{1}, Arabica Star^{2}, B-Care^{2}
Al-Tai	(Chile) José Luis Sierra	(Saudi Arabia) Abdulaziz Al-Harabi	Mashar	Al-Adham, Mashar, Abar^{1}, Al Ahli Medical^{1}, Qaid^{2}, Ldonk^{2}
Damac	(Croatia) Krešimir Režić	(Algeria) Farouk Chafaï	Skillano	ARROW, Bin Thaliba^{1}, Mustasharak Hospital^{1}, Qaid^{2}, X Antra^{3}

- ^{1} On the back of the strip.
- ^{2} On the right sleeve of the strip.
- ^{3} On the shorts.

=== Managerial changes ===
Team	Outgoing manager	Manner of departure	Date of vacancy	Position in table	Incoming manager	Date of appointment
Abha	(Tunisia) Abderrazek Chebbi	End of contract	31 May 2021	Pre-season	(Slovakia) Martin Ševela	1 July 2021
Al-Ahli	(Romania) Laurențiu Reghecampf	End of contract	31 May 2021	Pre-season	(Kosovo) Besnik Hasi	6 June 2021
Al-Batin	(Serbia) Aleksandar Veselinović	End of contract	31 May 2021	Pre-season	(Serbia) Nenad Lalatović	24 June 2021
Al-Faisaly	(Brazil) Péricles Chamusca	End of contract	31 May 2021	Pre-season	(Italy) Paolo Tramezzani	18 June 2021
Al-Hilal	(Portugal) José Morais	End of contract	31 May 2021	Pre-season	(Portugal) Leonardo Jardim	1 June 2021
Al-Raed	(Kosovo) Besnik Hasi	End of contract	31 May 2021	Pre-season	(Spain) Pablo Machín	19 June 2021
Al-Shabab	(Spain) Carlos Inarejos	End of contract	31 May 2021	Pre-season	(Brazil) Péricles Chamusca	31 May 2021
Al-Fayha	(Tunisia) Al-Habib bin Ramadan	End of contract	1 June 2021	Pre-season	(Serbia) Vuk Rašović	21 June 2021
Al-Hazem	(Tunisia) Mohammed Dahmane	End of contract	1 June 2021	Pre-season	(Portugal) Hélder	7 June 2021
Al-Taawoun	(England) Nestor El Maestro	Sacked	22 August 2021	14th	(Portugal) José Gomes	22 August 2021
Al-Ittihad	(Brazil) Fábio Carille	Sacked	23 August 2021	6th	(Romania) Cosmin Contra	29 August 2021
Al-Tai	(Tunisia) Mohamed Kouki	Sacked	28 August 2021	16th	(Serbia) Zoran Manojlović	30 August 2021
Al-Nassr	(Brazil) Mano Menezes	Sacked	19 September 2021	8th	(Portugal) Pedro Emanuel	1 October 2021
Al-Faisaly	(Italy) Paolo Tramezzani	Mutual consent	7 October 2021	9th	(Portugal) Daniel Ramos	7 October 2021
Al-Ettifaq	(Saudi Arabia) Khaled Al-Atwi	Mutual consent	16 October 2021	12th	(Serbia) Vladan Milojević	17 October 2021
Al-Batin	(Serbia) Nenad Lalatović	Sacked	17 October 2021	15th	(Croatia) Alen Horvat	21 October 2021
Al-Tai	(Serbia) Zoran Manojlović	Sacked	4 November 2021	16th	(Chile) José Luis Sierra	7 November 2021
Al-Nassr	(Portugal) Pedro Emanuel	Sacked	10 November 2021	9th	(Argentina) Miguel Ángel Russo	5 December 2021
Al-Hazem	(Portugal) Hélder	Sacked	27 November 2021	15th	(Romania) Constantin Gâlcă	6 December 2021
Al-Fateh	(Belgium) Yannick Ferrera	Mutual consent	9 January 2022	12th	(Greece) Georgios Donis	16 January 2022
Al-Raed	(Spain) Pablo Machín	Sacked	26 January 2022	8th	(Portugal) João Pedro Sousa	26 January 2022
Al-Hilal	(Portugal) Leonardo Jardim	Mutual consent	14 February 2022	4th	(Argentina) Ramón Díaz	14 February 2022
Al-Hazem	(Romania) Constantin Gâlcă	Mutual consent	21 February 2022	16th	(Netherlands) Roel Coumans	1 March 2022
Al-Faisaly	(Portugal) Daniel Ramos	Mutual consent	24 February 2022	13th	(Greece) Marinos Ouzounidis	27 February 2022
Al-Ettifaq	(Serbia) Vladan Milojević	Sacked	1 March 2022	15th	(France) Patrice Carteron	4 March 2022
Al-Ahli	(Kosovo) Besnik Hasi	Sacked	4 March 2022	11th	(Uruguay) Robert Siboldi	5 March 2022
Al-Taawoun	(Portugal) José Gomes	Mutual consent	20 March 2022	13th	(Netherlands) John van den Brom	31 March 2022
Al-Shabab	(Brazil) Péricles Chamusca	Sacked	23 March 2022	4th	(Romania) Marius Șumudică	23 March 2022
Al-Taawoun	(Netherlands) John van den Brom	Sacked	7 May 2022	14th	(Saudi Arabia) Mohammed Al-Abdali (caretaker)	7 May 2022
Al-Raed	(Portugal) João Pedro Sousa	Sacked	24 May 2022	12th	(Saudi Arabia) Yousef Al-Ghadeer	6 June 2022

=== Foreign players ===
The policy of foreign players remained unchanged. Clubs can register a total of seven foreign players over the course of the season.

Players name in bold indicates the player is registered during the mid-season transfer window.

Club	Player 1	Player 2	Player 3	Player 4	Player 5	Player 6	Player 7	Former Players
Abha	(Algeria) **Tayeb Meziani**	(Morocco) Amine Atouchi	(Morocco) Abdelali Mhamdi	(Serbia) Uroš Matić	(Suriname) Mitchell te Vrede	(Tunisia) Saad Bguir	(Tunisia) **Bilel Ifa**	(Republic of the Congo) Prestige Mboungou (Spain) Dani Suárez
Al-Ahli	(Brazil) **Carlos Eduardo**	(Brazil) Dankler	(Cameroon) **Franck Kom**	(Croatia) Filip Bradarić	(North Macedonia) Ezgjan Alioski	(Ba'athist Syria) Omar Al Somah		(Brazil) Paulinho (Senegal) Alassane Ndao (Serbia) Ljubomir Fejsa (Tunisia) Hamdi Nagguez
Al-Batin	(Angola) Fábio Abreu	(Brazil) Maurício Antônio	(Brazil) Renato Chaves	(Netherlands) Youssef El Jebli	(Netherlands) Mohamed Rayhi	(Uruguay) Martín Campaña		(Ghana) Afriyie Acquah
Al-Ettifaq	(Algeria) Ayoub Abdellaoui	(Algeria) Raïs M'Bolhi	(France) **Youssouf Niakaté**	(Germany) **Amin Younes**	(Slovakia) Filip Kiss	(Sweden) Robin Quaison	(Tunisia) Naïm Sliti	(Brazil) Souza (Morocco) Walid Azaro
Al-Faisaly	(Australia) **Martin Boyle**	(Brazil) **Clayson**	(Brazil) Igor Rossi	(Brazil) Ismael	(Brazil) **Rossi**	(Cape Verde) Júlio Tavares	(Netherlands) Hicham Faik	(Brazil) Guilherme Augusto (Brazil) Raphael Silva (France) Romain Amalfitano
Al-Fateh	(Algeria) Sofiane Bendebka	(Brazil) **Petros**	(Croatia) Ivan Santini	(Morocco) Mourad Batna	(Morocco) Marwane Saâdane	(Peru) Christian Cueva	(Ukraine) Maksym Koval	(Norway) Gustav Wikheim
Al-Fayha	(Brazil) Ramon Lopes	(Brazil) Ricardo Ryller	(Ghana) Samuel Owusu	(Greece) Panagiotis Tachtsidis	(Niger) Amadou Moutari	(North Macedonia) **Aleksandar Trajkovski**	(Serbia) Vladimir Stojković	(Brazil) Fernando Andrade (Greece) Kyriakos Papadopoulos (Ghana) John Boye
Al-Hazem	(Brazil) Alison	(Brazil) Neris	(Morocco) **Abdelilah Hafidi**	(Morocco) **Nawfel Zerhouni**	(Netherlands) Ola John	(Nigeria) **Ezekiel Henty**	(Serbia) **Luka Stojanović**	(Algeria) Malik Asselah (Mali) Ibrahima Tandia (Morocco) Moha (Portugal) Tiago Rodrigues (Sweden) Carlos Strandberg
Al-Hilal	(Brazil) **Michael**	(Brazil) Matheus Pereira	(Colombia) Gustavo Cuéllar	(Mali) Moussa Marega	(Nigeria) **Odion Ighalo**	(Peru) André Carrillo	(South Korea) Jang Hyun-soo	(Argentina) Luciano Vietto (France) Bafétimbi Gomis
Al-Ittihad	(Brazil) Bruno Henrique	(Brazil) Igor Coronado	(Brazil) Marcelo Grohe	(Brazil) Romarinho	(Egypt) Ahmed Hegazi	(Morocco) **Abderrazak Hamdallah**	(Portugal) **André André**	(Cape Verde) Garry Rodrigues (France) Youssouf Niakaté (Morocco) Karim El Ahmadi
Al-Nassr	(Argentina) Pity Martínez	(Argentina) Ramiro Funes Mori	(Brazil) Anselmo	(Brazil) Talisca	(Cameroon) Vincent Aboubakar	(Uruguay) **Jonathan Rodríguez**	(Uzbekistan) Jaloliddin Masharipov	(Brazil) Petros (Morocco) Abderrazak Hamdallah
Al-Raed	(Brazil) Eduardo Henrique	(Brazil) René	(Ghana) Christian Atsu	(Morocco) Karim El Berkaoui	(Morocco) Mohamed Fouzair	(Portugal) Éder	(Spain) Iago Herrerín	
Al-Shabab	(Argentina) Éver Banega	(Argentina) **Luciano Vietto**	(Brazil) Carlos Júnior	(Brazil) **Iago Santos**	(Brazil) Paulinho	(Cameroon) **John Mary**	(Senegal) Alfred N'Diaye	(Brazil) Sebá (Chile) Igor Lichnovsky (Nigeria) Odion Ighalo
Al-Taawoun	(Brazil) Cássio	(Cameroon) Léandre Tawamba	(Democratic Republic of the Congo) **Christian Luyindama**	(Egypt) **Mostafa Fathi**	(Netherlands) **Aschraf El Mahdioui**	(Spain) **Álvaro Medrán**	(Cape Verde) **Zé Luís**	(Brazil) Iago Santos (Brazil) Sandro Manoel (Burundi) Cédric Amissi (Moldova) Henrique Luvannor (Paraguay) Kaku
Al-Tai	(Algeria) Amir Sayoud	(Argentina) **Tobías Figueroa**	(Brazil) Dener	(Brazil) Marcelo	(Cameroon) **Collins Fai**	(Switzerland) Cephas Malele	(Zimbabwe) Knowledge Musona	(Brazil) Lucas (Bulgaria) Martin Lukov
Damac	(Algeria) Farouk Chafaï	(Algeria) Hillal Soudani	(Algeria) Moustapha Zeghba	(Argentina) Sergio Vittor	(Argentina) Emilio Zelaya	(Croatia) **Domagoj Antolić**	(Spain) **Nono**	(Brazil) Filipe Augusto (Croatia) Mijo Caktaš

== League table ==
Pos	Team	Pld	W	D	L	GF	GA	GD	Pts	Qualification or relegation
1	Al-Hilal (C)	30	20	7	3	63	28	+35	67	Qualification for AFC Champions League group stage (Note: Al-Fayha qualified for the AFC Champions League play-off round as 2021–22 King Cup winners.)
2	Al-Ittihad	30	20	5	5	62	29	+33	65	
3	Al-Nassr	30	19	4	7	58	36	+22	61	
4	Al-Shabab	30	15	10	5	52	36	+16	55	
5	Damac	30	12	8	10	38	44	−6	44	
6	Al-Tai	30	11	4	15	33	45	−12	37	
7	Al-Raed	30	10	6	14	35	45	−10	36	
8	Al-Fateh	30	9	8	13	45	41	+4	35 (Note: Head-to-head points: Al-Fateh 5, Abha 5, Al-Fayha 4. Head-to-head goal difference: Al-Fateh +1, Abha –1.)	
9	Abha	30	9	8	13	27	43	−16	35	
10	Al-Fayha	30	8	11	11	21	24	−3	35	Qualification for AFC Champions League group stage
11	Al-Ettifaq	30	8	10	12	40	47	−7	34 (Note: Head-to-head points: Al-Ettifaq 3, Al-Taawoun 3. Head-to-head goal difference: Al-Ettifaq +2, Al-Taawoun –2.)	
12	Al-Taawoun	30	7	13	10	43	48	−5	34	
13	Al-Batin	30	8	9	13	31	41	−10	33 (Note: Head-to-head points: Al-Batin 4, Al-Faisaly 1.)	
14	Al-Faisaly (R)	30	7	12	11	28	37	−9	33	Relegation to MS League
15	Al-Ahli (R)	30	6	14	10	38	43	−5	32	Relegation to MS League
16	Al-Hazem (R)	30	4	5	21	23	50	−27	17	Relegation to MS League

Source: spl.com
Rules for classification: 1) Points; 2) Head-to-head points; 3) Head-to-head goal difference; 4) Total goal difference; 5) Total goals scored; 6) Fair-play points (Note: Head-to-head record is used only after all the matches between the teams in question have been played).
(C) Champions; (R) Relegated

== Positions by round ==
The following table lists the positions of teams after each week of matches. In order to preserve the chronological evolution, any postponed matches are not included to the round at which they were originally scheduled but added to the full round they were played immediately afterward. If a club from the Saudi Professional League wins the King Cup, they will qualify for the AFC Champions League, unless they have already qualified for it through their league position. In this case, an additional AFC Champions League group stage berth will be given to the 3rd placed team, and the AFC Champions League play-off round spot will be given to 4th.

Team ╲ Round	1	2	3	4	5	6	7	8	9	10	11	12	13	14	15	16	17	18	19	20	21	22	23	24	25	26	27	28	29	30
Al-Hilal	4	1	2	4	2	2	4	7	4	4	4	4	4	5	5	4	4	4	4	4	4	4	4	2	2	2	2	2	1	1
Al-Ittihad	13	6	4	1	1	1	1	1	2	2	1	2	1	1	1	1	1	1	1	1	1	1	1	1	1	1	1	1	2	2
Al-Nassr	1	5	3	7	8	6	3	4	6	7	9	9	7	4	3	3	3	2	2	3	2	2	3	4	3	3	3	3	3	3
Al-Shabab	11	13	15	10	11	10	8	6	3	3	2	3	2	2	2	2	2	3	3	2	3	3	2	3	4	4	4	4	4	4
Damac	16	9	11	6	5	4	2	2	1	1	3	1	3	3	4	5	5	5	5	5	5	5	5	5	5	5	5	5	5	5
Al-Tai	15	16	16	16	16	14	11	12	15	15	16	16	16	10	8	9	11	11	13	10	10	10	10	11	12	12	9	8	9	6
Al-Raed	5	10	5	5	3	3	5	8	10	6	6	5	6	6	7	6	6	8	7	8	8	9	7	9	9	9	12	14	12	7
Al-Fateh	14	15	7	2	4	7	7	5	7	8	10	12	12	8	11	12	12	12	14	15	12	7	8	6	7	8	8	6	6	8
Abha	3	8	9	13	14	15	15	14	13	13	14	11	11	13	9	8	8	7	8	6	6	6	6	7	6	7	7	9	8	9
Al-Fayha	6	4	1	3	6	5	6	3	5	5	5	6	5	7	6	7	7	6	6	7	7	8	9	8	8	6	6	7	7	10
Al-Ettifaq	2	2	6	8	9	11	12	13	12	12	13	10	8	9	10	10	10	10	10	12	14	15	14	14	15	13	11	12	15	11
Al-Taawoun	7	14	14	14	15	16	16	16	16	16	12	14	14	15	14	11	13	13	15	11	11	12	12	12	13	14	13	10	10	12
Al-Batin	12	7	10	12	13	13	13	15	14	14	15	13	13	14	15	15	15	14	12	14	15	13	15	15	14	15	15	15	13	13
Al-Faisaly	10	3	8	11	7	9	9	9	9	10	8	8	10	12	13	14	14	15	11	13	13	14	13	13	11	11	14	13	11	14
Al-Ahli	9	12	12	9	10	12	14	11	8	9	7	7	9	11	12	13	9	9	9	9	9	11	11	10	10	10	10	11	14	15
Al-Hazem	8	11	13	15	12	8	10	10	11	11	11	15	15	16	16	16	16	16	16	16	16	16	16	16	16	16	16	16	16	16

Leader and AFC Champions League group stage
Relegation to MS League

Source: spl.sa

== Results ==
Home \ Away	ABH	AHL	BAT	ETT	FSY	FAT	FAY	HAZ	HIL	ITT	NSR	RAE	SHB	TWN	TAI	DAM
Abha		2–0	1–0	1–1	0–0	3–1	0–0	2–1	1–1	0–4	1–3	1–0	2–1	1–1	1–0	1–3
Al-Ahli	1–1		1–0	4–0	1–1	1–1	1–1	1–0	1–1	3–4	1–2	1–3	3–4	1–1	3–1	1–1
Al-Batin	2–1	2–2		0–0	1–0	0–2	2–0	0–0	1–1	2–3	3–4	2–0	0–3	3–2	0–0	2–1
Al-Ettifaq	1–2	1–0	2–1		1–0	0–0	1–1	5–2	0–2	1–3	2–2	2–2	2–2	1–3	0–1	0–1
Al-Faisaly	1–0	1–1	2–2	1–1		1–0	2–1	1–0	2–3	1–2	2–1	0–0	0–0	2–2	1–0	3–0
Al-Fateh	3–0	0–1	2–3	4–0	4–1		1–1	0–1	0–3	4–4	0–1	2–3	2–0	3–0	1–2	5–5
Al-Fayha	0–0	2–0	1–0	0–1	0–0	0–0		1–0	1–0	1–0	1–1	1–0	1–2	0–1	2–0	0–0
Al-Hazem	2–0	2–2	2–3	0–3	0–0	0–1	3–1		1–1	0–1	1–4	2–0	1–2	3–3	0–1	0–1
Al-Hilal	2–0	4–2	0–0	3–2	2–1	2–3	0–0	2–0		2–1	0–2	3–2	5–0	3–2	1–0	2–0
Al-Ittihad	6–1	2–0	0–0	3–2	1–0	3–0	2–0	3–0	1–3		3–0	3–0	0–2	1–1	1–0	2–1
Al-Nassr	2–1	1–1	1–0	0–1	4–0	2–1	1–0	2–1	0–4	1–3		2–2	4–2	3–1	4–1	4–1
Al-Raed	1–0	1–0	1–0	1–1	1–1	1–0	1–0	2–0	0–1	1–2	0–3		0–2	0–3	4–0	0–2
Al-Shabab	1–1	0–0	4–0	3–3	1–0	1–1	2–1	2–0	2–2	0–2	1–0	3–0		3–1	3–0	2–1
Al-Taawoun	2–0	1–1	1–0	0–4	2–2	1–1	1–1	2–1	1–2	1–1	0–1	3–5	1–1		1–2	3–0
Al-Tai	0–1	1–2	3–1	4–2	3–1	1–0	1–3	3–0	0–4	1–0	2–1	2–2	2–2	1–1		1–2
Damac	3–2	1–1	1–1	1–0	2–0	0–3	1–0	1–0	2–4	1–1	0–2	3–2	1–1	1–1	1–0	

Source: goalzz.com
Legend: Blue = home team win; Yellow = draw; Red = away team win.
For upcoming matches, an "a" indicates there is an article about the rivalry between the two participants.

== Season statistics ==
As of 27 June 2022

=== Scoring ===
==== Top scorers ====
Rank	Player	Club	Goals
1	(Nigeria) Odion Ighalo	Al-Shabab/Al-Hilal	24
2	(Brazil) Romarinho	Al-Ittihad	20
2	(Brazil) Talisca	Al-Nassr	20
4	(Cameroon) Léandre Tawamba	Al-Taawoun	18
5	(Morocco) Abderrazak Hamdallah	Al-Nassr/Al-Ittihad	15
6	(Argentina) Emilio Zelaya	Damac	13
6	(Morocco) Karim El Berkaoui	Al-Raed	13
6	(Brazil) Carlos	Al-Shabab	13
6	(Mali) Moussa Marega	Al-Hilal	13
10	(Saudi Arabia) Firas Al-Buraikan	Al-Fateh	11

==== Hat-tricks ====
Player	For	Against	Result	Date	Ref.
(Morocco) Abderrazak Hamdallah	Al-Ittihad	Al-Ahli	4–3 (A)	26 February 2022	
(Nigeria) Odion Ighalo	Al-Hilal	Al-Ahli	4–2 (H)	18 March 2022	
(Saudi Arabia) Firas Al-Buraikan	Al-Fateh	Damac	3–0 (A)	29 May 2022	

Notes

(H) – Home; (A) – Away

=== Clean sheets ===
Rank	Player	Club	Clean sheets
1	(Serbia) Vladimir Stojković	Al-Fayha	13
2	(Brazil) Marcelo Grohe	Al-Ittihad	12
3	(Saudi Arabia) Abdullah Al-Mayouf	Al-Hilal	11
4	(Ukraine) Maksym Koval	Al-Fateh	9
4	(Saudi Arabia) Fawaz Al-Qarni	Al-Shabab	9
6	(Algeria) Moustapha Zeghba	Damac	8
6	(Uruguay) Martín Campaña	Al-Batin	8
8	(Algeria) Raïs M'Bolhi	Al-Ettifaq	7
8	(Morocco) Abdelali Mhamdi	Abha	7
8	(Saudi Arabia) Mustafa Malayekah	Al-Faisaly	7

=== Discipline ===
==== Player ====
- Most yellow cards: 10
  - (Saudi Arabia) Saeed Al-Rubaie (Al-Ettifaq)
  - (Brazil) Ismael (Al-Faisaly)
- Most red cards: 2
  - (Morocco) Marwane Saâdane (Al-Fateh)
  - (Saudi Arabia) Ammar Al-Daheem (Al-Fateh)
  - (Saudi Arabia) Abdullah Al-Shammeri (Al-Hazem)
  - (Saudi Arabia) Mohammed Al-Khabrani (Al-Ahli)
  - (Argentina) Éver Banega (Al-Shabab)
  - (Brazil) Talisca (Al-Nassr)

==== Club ====
- Most yellow cards: 77
  - Al-Ahli
  - Al-Taawoun
- Most red cards: 8
  - Al-Ettifaq

== Attendances ==
=== By round ===
2021–22 Professional League Attendance
Round	Total	GP.	Avg. Per Game
Round 1	38,554	8	4,820
Round 2	43,357	8	5,420
Round 3	46,759	8	5,845
Round 4	66,838	8	8,355
Round 5	50,724	8	6,341
Round 6	73,053	8	9,132
Round 7	39,761	8	4,971
Round 8	63,970	8	7,997
Round 9	69,559	8	8,695
Round 10	59,643	8	7,456
Round 11	99,764	8	12,471
Round 12	43,070	8	5,384
Round 13	102,742	8	12,843
Round 14	60,736	8	7,592
Round 15 (Note: Matches from 29 December (Round 15) until 5 March (Round 23) were played at a maximum of 50% capacity.)	30,641	8	3,831
Round 16	61,124	8	7,641
Round 17	44,604	8	5,576
Round 18	58,788	8	7,349
Round 19	44,528	8	5,566
Round 20	40,133	7 (Note: Al-Ittihad played their home match against Al-Nassr behind closed doors due to disciplinary reasons.)	5,734
Round 21	39,750	8	4,969
Round 22	48,731	8	6,092
Round 23	65,566	8	8,196
Round 24	86,528	8	10,816
Round 25	90,813	7 (Note: Al-Nassr played their home match against Al-Fayha behind closed doors due to disciplinary reasons.)	12,974
Round 26	50,955	8	6,370
Round 27	119,916	7 (Note: Al-Shabab played their home match against Al-Faisaly behind closed doors due to disciplinary reasons.)	17,131
Round 28	51,816	8	6,477
Round 29	85,769	8	10,722
Round 30	90,487	8	11,311
Total	1,868,679	237	7,885

=== By team ===
A match played behind closed doors is not included.

Pos	Team	Total	High	Low	Average	Change
1	Al-Ittihad	466,283	58,755	0	33,306	n/a^{1}
2	Al-Ahli	227,018	36,079	7,031	15,135	n/a
3	Al-Hilal	193,304	33,963	5,211	12,887	n/a
4	Al-Nassr	117,310	16,458	0	8,380	n/a^{2}
5	Al-Fateh	119,621	17,459	1,392	7,975	n/a
6	Al-Ettifaq	100,619	15,670	907	6,708	n/a
7	Al-Raed	90,195	20,082	668	6,013	n/a
8	Al-Shabab	79,029	11,234	3,099	5,645	n/a^{3}
9	Al-Tai	79,746	7,762	3,036	5,317	n/a
10	Al-Taawoun	78,183	9,780	2,188	5,213	n/a
11	Al-Fayha	72,497	6,342	1,527	4,834	n/a
12	Al-Faisaly	66,277	6,410	1,764	4,419	n/a
13	Damac	63,636	14,790	453	4,243	n/a
14	Al-Batin	45,220	4,238	1,102	3,015	n/a
15	Abha	43,101	12,243	141	2,874	n/a
16	Al-Hazem	26,640	3,940	531	1,776	n/a
	League total	1,868,679	58,755	0	7,885	n/a

Updated to games played on 27 June 2022
Notes:
1: Al-Ittihad played their home match against Al-Nassr behind closed doors.
2: Al-Nassr played their home match against Al-Fayha behind closed doors.
3: Al-Shabab played their home match against Al-Faisaly behind closed doors.

== Awards ==
=== Monthly awards ===
Month	Manager of the Month		Player of the Month		Goalkeeper of the Month		Rising Star of the Month		Reference
Month	Manager	Club	Player	Club	Player	Club	Player	Club	Reference
August	(Serbia) Vuk Rašović	Al-Fayha	(Egypt) Ahmed Hegazi	Al-Ittihad	(Serbia) Vladimir Stojković	Al-Fayha	(Saudi Arabia) Moteb Al-Harbi	Al-Shabab	
September	(Croatia) Krešimir Režić	Damac	(Brazil) Igor Coronado	Al-Ittihad	(Algeria) Moustapha Zeghba	Damac	(Saudi Arabia) Nawaf Boushal	Al-Fateh	
October	(Brazil) Péricles Chamusca	Al-Shabab	(Saudi Arabia) Abdulrahman Ghareeb	Al-Ahli	(Saudi Arabia) Fawaz Al-Qarni	Al-Shabab	(Saudi Arabia) Moteb Al-Harbi	Al-Shabab	
November	(Brazil) Péricles Chamusca	Al-Shabab	(Tunisia) Naïm Sliti	Al-Ettifaq	(Saudi Arabia) Ahmed Al-Kassar	Al-Faisaly	(Saudi Arabia) Moteb Al-Harbi	Al-Shabab	
January	(Argentina) Miguel Ángel Russo	Al-Nassr	(Brazil) Romarinho	Al-Ittihad	(Serbia) Vladimir Stojković	Al-Fayha	(Saudi Arabia) Moteb Al-Harbi	Al-Shabab	
February	(Romania) Cosmin Contra	Al-Ittihad	(Morocco) Abderrazak Hamdallah	Al-Ittihad	(Saudi Arabia) Mustafa Malayekah	Al-Faisaly	(Saudi Arabia) Firas Al-Buraikan	Al-Fateh	
March	(Argentina) Ramón Díaz	Al-Hilal	(Nigeria) Odion Ighalo	Al-Hilal	(Brazil) Marcelo Grohe	Al-Ittihad	(Saudi Arabia) Muhannad Al-Shanqeeti	Al-Ittihad	
May & June	(Argentina) Ramón Díaz	Al-Hilal	(Tunisia) Naïm Sliti	Al-Ettifaq	(Saudi Arabia) Abdullah Al-Mayouf	Al-Hilal	(Saudi Arabia) Nawaf Al-Aqidi	Al-Tai	

=== Team of the Season ===
Team of the Season
Goalkeeper	(Serbia) Vladimir Stojković (Al-Fayha)			
Defenders	(Algeria) Farouk Chafaï (Damac)		(Egypt) Ahmed Hegazi (Al-Ittihad)	(North Macedonia) Ezgjan Alioski (Al-Ahli)
Midfielders	(Brazil) Bruno Henrique (Al-Ittihad)	(Saudi Arabia) Salem Al-Dawsari (Al-Hilal)	(Peru) Christian Cueva (Al-Fateh)	(Brazil) Romarinho (Al-Ittihad)
Forwards	(Nigeria) Odion Ighalo (Al-Hilal)		(Brazil) Anderson Talisca (Al-Nassr)	(Argentina) Éver Banega (Al-Shabab)
