= Nawaf Boushal =

Saudi Arabian footballer

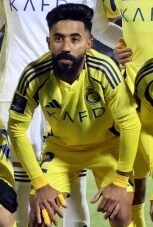
- Boushal with Al-Nassr in 2025

Personal information
- Full name: Nawaf Mashari Abdulrahman Boushal
- Date of birth: 16 September 1999 (age 27)
- Place of birth: Al-Hasa, Saudi Arabia
- Height: 1.73 m (5 ft 8 in)
- Position: Right-back

Team information
- Current team: Al-Nassr
- Number: 12

Youth career
- –2019: Al-Fateh

Senior career*
| Years | Team | Apps | (Gls) |
| 2019–2023 | Al-Fateh | 84 | (3) |
| 2023– | Al-Nassr | 98 | (2) |

International career^{‡}
| 2020–2022 | Saudi Arabia U23 | | |
| 2021– | Saudi Arabia | 33 | (0) |
- * Club domestic league appearances and goals as of 20 November 2026 ‡ National team caps and goals as of 17 November 2026

Nawaf Mashari Abdulrahman Boushal (born 16 September 1999) is a Saudi Arabian professional footballer who plays as a right-back for Saudi Pro League club Al-Nassr and the Saudi Arabia national team.

== Club Career ==
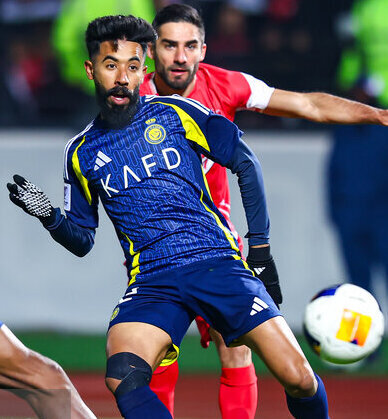
Boushal with Al-Nassr in 2025

Boushal started his career at hometown club Al-Fateh. On 31 August 2019, he signed his first professional contract with the club. He made his debut on 22 November 2019 in the league match against Abha. On 2 March 2022, Boushal renewed his contract with Al-Fateh. On 20 January 2023, Boushal joined Al-Nassr on a four-and-a-half-year deal.

== International Career ==
On 31 May 2026, he was named in the 26-man squad for the 2026 FIFA World Cup.

== Career statistics ==
=== Club ===
As of 31 May 2024.

| Club | Season | League | | | Cup | | Continental | | Other | | Total | |
| Club | Season | Division | Apps | Goals | Apps | Goals | Apps | Goals | Apps | Goals | Apps | Goals |
|---|---|---|---|---|---|---|---|---|---|---|---|---|
| Al-Fateh | 2018–19 | Pro League | 0 | 0 | 0 | 0 | — | | — | | 0 | 0 |
| Al-Fateh | 2019–20 | Pro League | 17 | 0 | 3 | 0 | — | | — | | 20 | 0 |
| Al-Fateh | 2020–21 | Pro League | 29 | 2 | 3 | 0 | — | | — | | 32 | 2 |
| Al-Fateh | 2021–22 | Pro League | 27 | 1 | 0 | 0 | — | | — | | 27 | 1 |
| Al-Fateh | 2022–23 | Pro League | 11 | 0 | 1 | 0 | — | | — | | 12 | 0 |
| Al-Fateh | Total | | 84 | 3 | 7 | 0 | 0 | 0 | 0 | 0 | 91 | 3 |
| Al-Nassr | 2022–23 | Pro League | 10 | 0 | 1 | 0 | — | | 1 (Note: Appearance(s) in Saudi Super Cup) | 0 | 12 | 0 |
| Al-Nassr | 2023–24 | Pro League | 14 | 0 | 3 | 0 | 4 | 0 | 1 (Note: Appearance(s) in Arab Club Champions Cup) | 0 | 22 | 0 |
| Al-Nassr | Total | | 24 | 0 | 4 | 0 | 4 | 0 | 2 | 0 | 34 | 0 |
| Career totals | | | 108 | 3 | 11 | 0 | 4 | 0 | 2 | 0 | 125 | 3 |

== Honours ==
Al-Nassr

- Saudi Pro League: 2025–26
- Arab Club Champions Cup: 2023
- King's Cup runners-up: 2023–24
- Saudi Super Cup runners-up: 2024

Individual

- Saudi Pro League Young Player of the Month: September 2021
