= Qassem Lajami =

Saudi Arabian footballer (born 1996)

Personal information
- Full name: Qassem Mohammed Ali Lajami
- Date of birth: 24 April 1996 (age 30)
- Place of birth: Qatif, Saudi Arabia
- Height: 1.78 m (5 ft 10 in)
- Position: Defender

Team information
- Current team: Al-Diriyah
- Number: 87

Youth career
- –2014: Al-Muheet
- 2014–2015: Al-Khaleej

Senior career*
Years	Team	Apps	(Gls)
2015–2019	Al-Khaleej	70	(4)
2019–2024	Al-Fateh	57	(1)
2024–2026	Al-Qadsiah	16	(0)
2026	→ Al-Taawoun (loan)	14	(0)
2026–	Al-Diriyah	2	(0)

International career^{‡}
2017–2018	Saudi Arabia U23		
2023	Saudi Arabia	3	(0)
- * Club domestic league appearances and goals as of 25 August 2026 (UTC) ‡ National team caps and goals as of 12 January 2023

Qassem Lajami (Arabic: قاسم لاجامي; born 24 April 1996) is a Saudi Arabian professional footballer who plays as a defender for Saudi Pro League side Al-Diriyah.

His twin brother Ali is also a professional footballer and as of August 2023 plays as a defender for Saudi Pro League club Al Nassr.

== Career ==
On 1 June 2019, Lajami joined Al-Fateh on a five-year deal.

On 14 July 2024, Lajami joined Al-Qadsiah on a two-year deal.

On 3 February 2026, Lajami joined Al-Taawoun on a six-month loan.

== Career statistics ==
=== Club ===
As of match played 3 May 2026

Appearances and goals by club, season and competition
Club	Season	League			King Cup		Crown Prince Cup (Note: Discontinued in September 19, 2017)		Other		Total	
Club	Season	Division	Apps	Goals	Apps	Goals	Apps	Goals	Apps	Goals	Apps	Goals
Al-Khaleej	2014–15	Pro League	0	0	0	0	0	0	—		0	0
Al-Khaleej	2015–16	Pro League	0	0	0	0	0	0	—		0	0
Al-Khaleej	2016–17	Pro League	13	0	1	0	1	0	—		15	0
Al-Khaleej	2017–18	MS League	28	0	0	0	—		—		28	0
Al-Khaleej	2018–19	MS League	29	4	2	0	—		2 (Note: Appearance in Pro League play-offs)	0	33	4
Al-Khaleej	Total		70	4	3	0	1	0	2	0	76	4
Al-Fateh	2019–20	Pro League	2	0	1	0	—		—		3	0
Al-Fateh	2020–21	Pro League	6	1	0	0	—		—		6	1
Al-Fateh	2021–22	Pro League	20	0	1	0	—		—		21	0
Al-Fateh	2022–23	Pro League	8	0	0	0	—		—		8	0
Al-Fateh	2023–24	Pro League	21	0	1	0	—		—		22	0
Al-Fateh	Total		57	1	3	0	0	0	0	0	60	1
Al Qadsiah	2024–25	Pro League	12	0	3	0	—		0	0	15	0
Al Qadsiah	2025–26	Pro League	4	0	0	0	—		—		4	0
Al Qadsiah	Total		16	0	3	0	0	0	0	0	19	0
Al Taawoun (loan)	2025–26	Pro League	12	0	0	0	—		—		12	0
Career total			155	5	9	0	1	0	2	0	167	5
