= Firas Al-Buraikan =

Saudi Arabian footballer (born 2000)

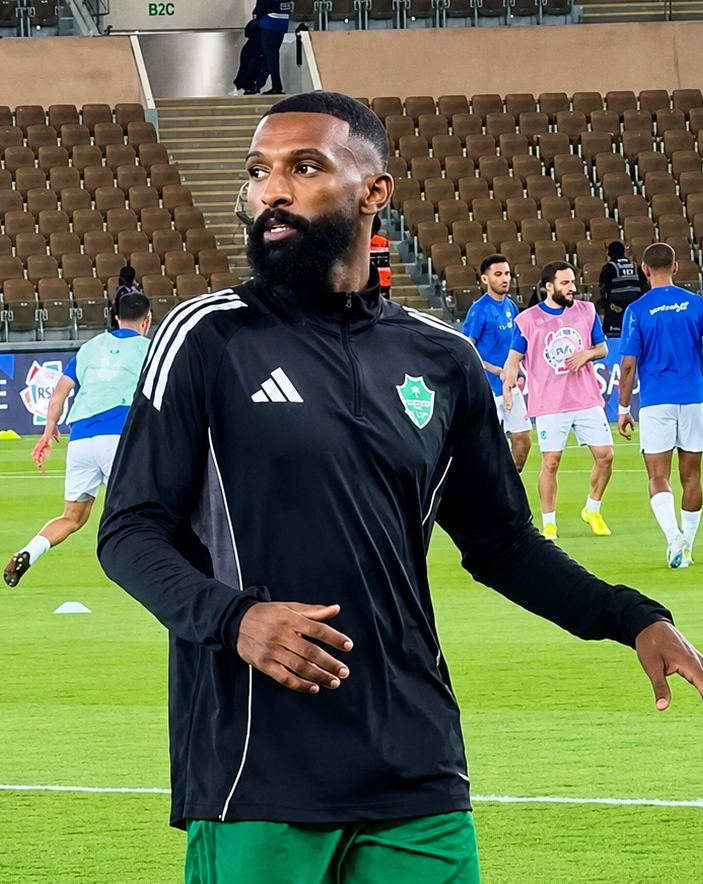
- Al-Buraikan with Al-Ahli in 2026

Personal information
- Full name: Firas Tariq Nasser Al-Buraikan
- Date of birth: 14 May 2000 (age 26)
- Place of birth: Riyadh, Saudi Arabia
- Height: 1.81 m (5 ft 11 in)
- Position: Striker

Team information
- Current team: Al-Ahli
- Number: 9

Youth career
- 2011–2017: Al-Nassr

Senior career*
Years	Team	Apps	(Gls)
2017–2021	Al-Nassr	28	(4)
2021–2023	Al-Fateh	62	(32)
2023–	Al-Ahli	106	(23)

International career^{‡}
2017–2019	Saudi Arabia U20	20	(14)
2019–2022	Saudi Arabia U23	9	(3)
2019–	Saudi Arabia	81	(20)
Medal record
Men's football
Representing Saudi Arabia
Arabian Gulf Cup
Winner	2026 Saudi Arabia
AFC U-23 Asian Cup
Winner	2022 Uzbekistan
AFC U-19 Championship
Winner	2018 Indonesia
AFC U-23 Championship
Runner-up	2020 Thailand
- * Club domestic league appearances and goals as of 20 November 2026 ‡ National team caps and goals as of 17 November 2026

Firas Tariq Nasser Al-Buraikan (Arabic: فِرَاس طَارِق نَاصِر الْبُرَيْكَان; born 14 May 2000), simply known as Feras, is a Saudi Arabian professional footballer who plays as a striker or winger for Saudi Professional League side Al-Ahli and the Saudi Arabia national team.

== Club career ==
On 8 July 2021, Al-Buraikan joined Al-Fateh on a four-year deal. Al-Buraikan ended his first season at Al-Fateh scoring 11 goals and assisting four in 28 matches. He finished as the club's top scorer. In his second season, Al-Buraikan scored 18 goals in all competitions, once again finishing as the club's top scorer. On 3 June 2023, Al-Buraikan renewed his contract with Al-Fateh until the end of the 2027–28 season.

On 3 September 2023, Firas Al-Buraikan joined Al-Ahli on a five-year deal for a reported fee of SAR40 million (around €9.9 million). On 25 April 2026, he scored the only goal in a 1–0 extra-time victory over Machida Zelvia in the AFC Champions League Elite final, securing his club's second consecutive title in the competition.

== International career ==
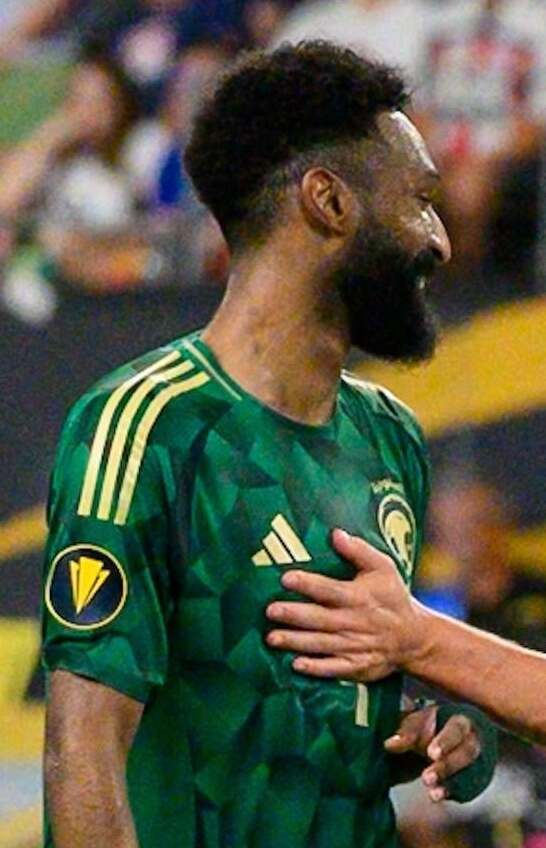
Al-Buraikan with Saudi Arabia in 2025

Firas Al-Buraikan was first summoned for the U-20 national team in Saudi Arabia's successful 2018 AFC U-19 Championship conquest, scoring one goal in Saudi Arabia's 3–1 win over Australia. Although scoring just one, his successful display in the tournament allowed him to be summoned for the Saudi squad in the 2019 FIFA U-20 World Cup, where he had a successful performance with two goals against Mali and Panama; however, his successful performance didn't transcend to the team as the under-20 Asian champions crumbled from the group stage with a humiliating three straight defeats. He carried the same successes to the under-23 team in the 2020 AFC U-23 Championship and 2022 AFC U-23 Asian Cup, as the Saudis reached the final twice, winning the latter for the first time; the good form in 2020 event allowed him to become part of the Saudi Olympic side in the 2020 Summer Olympics, though this time, he failed to score as Saudi Arabia once again crumbled at the group stage with three straight defeats.

Nonetheless, his good form at the under-20 allowed him to be summoned for the senior side in 2019 for the 2022 FIFA World Cup qualification – AFC second round against Singapore. He scored his first international goal against Kuwait in the 24th Arabian Gulf Cup as Saudi Arabia lost 3–1. He went on to play an instrumental role, scoring three goals in the third round as Saudi Arabia impressed by topping the qualifiers. He then took part in the 2022 FIFA World Cup of the squad, and greatly impressed with an assist in Saudi Arabia's historic 2–1 win over Argentina in what would be the greatest upset in World Cup history. However, the assist turned to be Al-Buraikan's only impression, as his inability to score saw Saudi Arabia condemned to bottom place after losing to Poland and Mexico.

On 31 May 2026, he was named in the 26-man squad for the 2026 FIFA World Cup.

== Career statistics ==
=== Club ===
As of match played 20 January 2025

Appearances and goals by club, season and competition
Club	Season	League			King's Cup		Continental		Other		Total	
Club	Season	Division	Apps	Goals	Apps	Goals	Apps	Goals	Apps	Goals	Apps	Goals
Al-Nassr	2017–18	Saudi Pro League	1	1	1	0	—		—		2	1
Al-Nassr	2018–19	Saudi Pro League	4	0	2	0	5 (Note: Appearances in AFC Champions League)	0	1 (Note: Appearance in Arab Club Champions Cup)	0	12	0
Al-Nassr	2019–20	Saudi Pro League	9	1	1	0	8	0	0	0	18	1
Al-Nassr	2020–21	Saudi Pro League	14	2	1	0	0	0	0	0	15	2
Al-Nassr	Total		28	4	5	0	13	0	1	0	47	4
Al-Fateh	2021–22	Saudi Pro League	27	11	1	0	—		—		28	11
Al-Fateh	2022–23	Saudi Pro League	30	17	2	1	—		—		32	18
Al-Fateh	2023–24	Saudi Pro League	5	4	0	0	—		—		5	4
Al-Fateh	Total		62	32	3	1	0	0	0	0	65	33
Al-Ahli	2023–24	Saudi Pro League	27	13	2	2	—		—		29	15
Al-Ahli	2024–25	Saudi Pro League	15	2	1	0	6 (Note: Appearances in AFC Champions League Elite)	2	0	0	22	4
Al-Ahli	Total		42	15	3	2	6	2	0	0	51	19
Career total			132	51	11	3	19	2	1	0	163	56

=== International ===
As of match played 17 November 2026

Scores and results list Saudi Arabia's goal tally first.

List of international goals scored by Firas Al-Buraikan
No.	Date	Venue	Opponent	Score	Result	Competition
1.	27 November 2019	Abdullah bin Khalifa Stadium, Doha, Qatar	Kuwait	1–3	1–3	24th Arabian Gulf Cup
2.	2 December 2019	Abdullah bin Khalifa Stadium, Doha, Qatar	Oman	1–0	3–1	24th Arabian Gulf Cup
3.	14 November 2020	Prince Faisal bin Fahd Stadium, Riyadh, Saudi Arabia	Jamaica	3–0	3–0	Friendly
4.	7 October 2021	King Abdullah Sports City Stadium, Jeddah, Saudi Arabia	Japan	1–0	1–0	2022 FIFA World Cup qualification
5.	12 October 2021	King Abdullah Sports City Stadium, Jeddah, Saudi Arabia	China	3–1	3–2	2022 FIFA World Cup qualification
6.	27 January 2022	King Abdullah Sports City Stadium, Jeddah, Saudi Arabia	Oman	1–0	1–0	2022 FIFA World Cup qualification
7.	4 January 2024	Saoud bin Abdulrahman Stadium, Al-Wakrah, Qatar	Lebanon	1–0	1–0	Friendly
8.	26 March 2024	Pamir Stadium, Dushanbe, Tajikistan	Tajikistan	1–0	1–1	2026 FIFA World Cup qualification
9.	6 June 2024	Jinnah Sports Stadium, Islamabad, Pakistan	Pakistan	1–0	3–0	2026 FIFA World Cup qualification
10.	6 June 2024	Jinnah Sports Stadium, Islamabad, Pakistan	Pakistan	2–0	3–0	2026 FIFA World Cup qualification
11.	22 June 2025	Allegiant Stadium, Paradise, United States	Trinidad and Tobago	1–1	1–1	2025 CONCACAF Gold Cup
12.	4 September 2025	FK Viktoria Stadion, Prague, Czech Republic	North Macedonia	1–1	2–1	Friendly
13.	8 October 2025	King Abdullah Sports City Stadium, Jeddah, Saudi Arabia	Indonesia	2–1	3–2	2026 FIFA World Cup qualification
14.	8 October 2025	King Abdullah Sports City Stadium, Jeddah, Saudi Arabia	Indonesia	3–1	3–2	2026 FIFA World Cup qualification
15.	2 December 2025	Education City Stadium, Al Rayyan, Qatar	Oman	1–0	2–1	2025 FIFA Arab Cup
16.	11 December 2025	Lusail Stadium, Lusail, Qatar	Palestine	1–0	2–1 (a.e.t.)	2025 FIFA Arab Cup
17.	26 September 2026	King Abdullah Sports City Stadium, Jeddah, Saudi Arabia	Oman	1–0	3–0	27th Arabian Gulf Cup
18.	26 September 2026	King Abdullah Sports City Stadium, Jeddah, Saudi Arabia	Oman	3–0	3–0	27th Arabian Gulf Cup
19.	6 October 2026	King Abdullah Sports City Stadium, Jeddah, Saudi Arabia	United Arab Emirates	2–0	2–0	27th Arabian Gulf Cup
20.	17 November 2026	Jassim bin Hamad Stadium, Doha, Qatar	Uzbekistan	1–1	1–2	Friendly

== Honours ==
=== Club ===
Al-Nassr

- Saudi Pro League: 2018–19
- Saudi Super Cup: 2019, 2020

Al-Ahli

- Saudi Super Cup: 2025
- AFC Champions League Elite: 2024–25, 2025–26

=== National ===
Saudi Arabia U19

- AFC U-19 Championship: 2018

Saudi Arabia U23

- AFC U-23 Asian Cup: 2022

Saudi Arabia

- Arabian Gulf Cup: 2026

Individual

- Saudi Pro League Young Player of the Month: February 2022, October 2022, April 2023, May 2023
- Arabian Gulf Cup Golden Boot: 2026
