= Christian Cueva =

Peruvian footballer (born 1991)

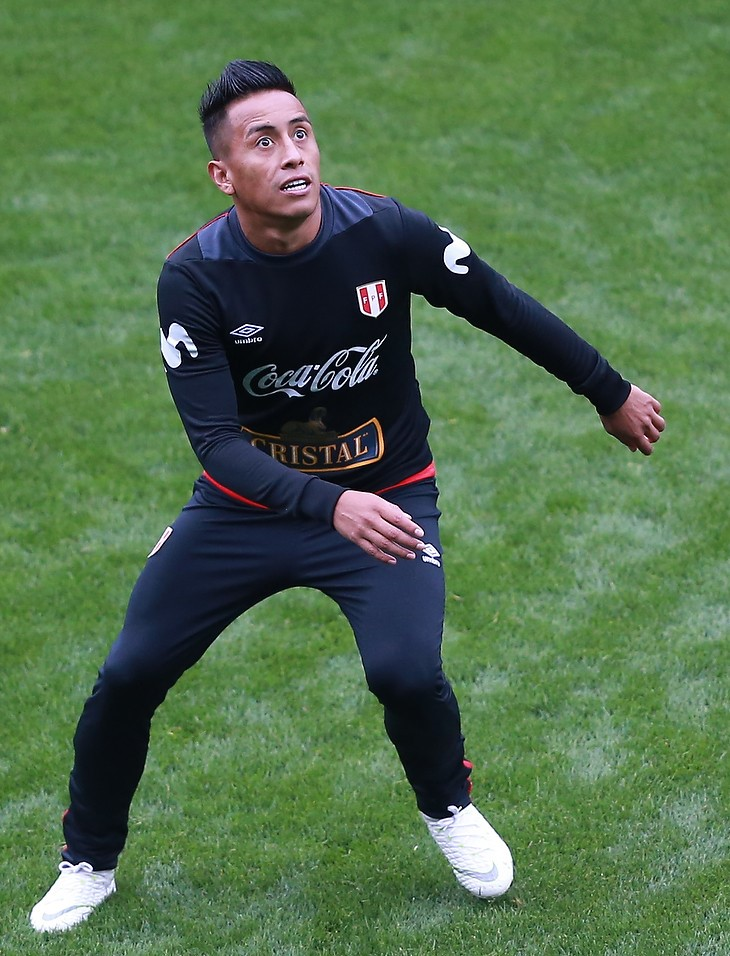
- Cueva training with Peru at the 2018 FIFA World Cup

Personal information
- Full name: Christian Alberto Cueva Bravo
- Date of birth: 23 November 1991 (age 34)
- Place of birth: Trujillo, Peru
- Height: 1.69 m (5 ft 7 in)
- Position: Attacking midfielder

Team information
- Current team: Sport Boys (on loan from Juan Pablo II)
- Number: 99

Youth career
- 2005–2006: Racing de Huamachuco
- 2007–2008: USMP

Senior career*
| Years | Team | Apps | (Gls) |
| 2008–2012 | USMP | 121 | (19) |
| 2012 | UCV | 5 | (0) |
| 2013 | Unión Española B | 2 | (0) |
| 2013–2014 | Unión Española | 16 | (0) |
| 2013–2014 | → Rayo Vallecano (loan) | 1 | (0) |
| 2014 | → Rayo Vallecano B (loan) | 8 | (5) |
| 2014–2015 | Alianza Lima | 19 | (3) |
| 2015–2016 | Toluca | 36 | (4) |
| 2016–2018 | São Paulo | 55 | (10) |
| 2018–2020 | Krasnodar | 15 | (0) |
| 2019 | → Santos (loan) | 5 | (0) |
| 2020 | Pachuca | 2 | (0) |
| 2020–2021 | Malatyaspor | 8 | (0) |
| 2021–2023 | Al-Fateh | 48 | (16) |
| 2023 | → Alianza Lima (loan) | 22 | (0) |
| 2024–2025 | Cienciano | 18 | (6) |
| 2025 | Emelec | 15 | (2) |
| 2026– | Juan Pablo II College | 15 | (2) |
| 2026– | → Sport Boys (loan) | 7 | (1) |

International career^{‡}
| 2011 | Peru U20 | 4 | (0) |
| 2011–2025 | Peru | 100 | (16) |
Medal record
Men's football
Representing Peru
Copa América
| Runner-up | 2019 Brazil |
| Third place | 2015 Chile |
- * Club domestic league appearances and goals as of 6 December 2025 ‡ National team caps and goals as of 22:48, 29 June 2024 (UTC)

Christian Alberto Cueva Bravo (born 23 November 1991) is a Peruvian professional footballer who plays as an attacking midfielder for Peruvian Liga 1 club Sport Boys on loan from Juan Pablo II College and the Peru national team.

Cueva was a member of the Peru national team that finished in third place at the 2015 Copa América and runners-up at the 2019 Copa América, also taking part at the Copa América Centenario, the 2018 FIFA World Cup, the 2021 Copa América and the 2024 Copa América.

== Club career ==
=== Early career ===
Born in Trujillo, Cueva started his career playing for amateurs Instituto Pedagógico Nacional Monterrico, at the age of 14. In August 2007, he played for a Huamachuco representative side in a friendly against Universidad San Martín, impressing enough to secure a subsequent move to the club's under-20 side.

=== Universidad San Martín ===
On 12 April 2008, aged only 16, Cueva made his first team – and Torneo Descentralizado – debut, coming on as a second-half substitute in a 3–1 away loss against Universidad César Vallejo.

Cueva finished his first senior season with two goals in 18 appearances, as his side was crowned champions. He only became a regular starter for the side from the 2010 season onwards, and finished his spell at the club with 20 goals in 121 league appearances. With Universidad San Martín, he won the 2008 and 2010 Torneo Descentralizado.

=== Universidad César Vallejo ===
On 3 August 2012, Cueva moved to fellow first division side César Vallejo. In November, however, his contract was rescinded by the club after a series of indiscipline problems.

=== Unión Española ===
On 24 January 2013, after being linked to a move to Ponte Preta, he was announced at Chilean Primera División side Unión Española. He won the Chilean First Division in 2013 with Unión Española.

==== Rayo Vallecano (loan) ====
On 13 August 2013, Cueva joined La Liga club Rayo Vallecano on a one-year loan deal.

On 1 March 2014, after being rarely used by manager Paco Jémez, Cueva was assigned to the reserves in Tercera División. On his debut for the B-team nine days later, he scored a hat-trick in a 3–2 defeat of Internacional de Madrid.

=== Alianza Lima ===
On 18 August 2014, free agent Cueva returned to his home country after agreeing to an 18-month contract with Alianza Lima. A regular starter during the 2014 Clausura Tournament, he was handed a six-match suspension after being sent off in a 1–0 loss to Real Garcilaso for the 2015 Apertura Tournament; the sentence was later reduced to three matches.

=== Toluca ===
On 18 July 2015, Cueva signed for Mexican club Toluca. He made his debut for the club on 29 July, replacing Diego Aguilar in a 4–3 home defeat of Necaxa, for the year's Copa Mexico.

=== São Paulo ===
On 2 June 2016, Cueva signed a four-year contract with Brazilian side São Paulo FC.

On 22 February 2017, Cueva extended his contract until 2021. However, he subsequently had multiple indiscipline problems, being fined twice and having a face off with teammate Rodrigo Caio due to the club's poor results.

=== Krasnodar ===
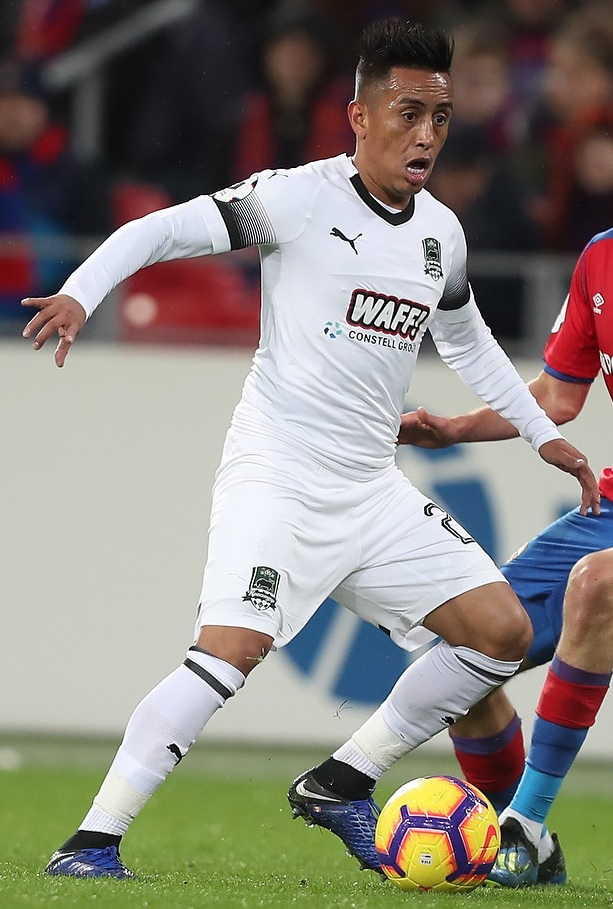
Cueva with Krasnodar in 2018

On 19 July 2018, Cueva signed a four-year contract with the Russian Premier League club FC Krasnodar.

=== Santos ===
On 7 February 2019, Cueva returned to Brazil after agreeing to a one-year loan deal with Santos FC, with an obligation to buy on a three-year contract on 31 January 2020, for an estimated fee of € 6 million.

In September 2019, Cueva was caught fighting on a nightclub in Santos, being subsequently dropped from the first team squad. Santos president José Carlos Peres later requested the lining up of Cueva in a TV interview, which was later dismissed by the club's director of football Paulo Autuori.

Despite appearing on time for the 2020 pre-season, Cueva left Santos in late January, being later found in Argentina; in the meantime, Santos tried to negotiate the player San Lorenzo unsuccessfully. Cueva later attempted to rescind his contract with the club through FIFA, after alleging unpaid wages; he also reached an agreement with Pachuca.

On 14 February 2020, FIFA authorized Cueva to play for the Mexican club, while also authorizing Santos to charge for a restitution fee for his transfer.

=== Pachuca ===
On 15 February 2020, after FIFA's clearance, Pachuca announced the signing of Cueva.

=== Yeni Malatyaspor ===
In August 2020, Cueva moved to Turkish club Yeni Malatyaspor.

=== Al-Fateh ===
In January 2021, Cueva moved to Saudi Arabian club Al-Fateh. On 4 February 2021, he made his debut for Al-Fateh in a 4–1 away loss against Al-Ittihad.

==== Alianza Lima (loan) ====
On 13 March 2023, Cueva returned to Peruvian Liga 1 club Alianza Lima.

=== Cienciano ===
In September 2024 he signed for Cienciano. He distinguished himself at the 2015 Copa Sudamericana, where he led his team to the round of 16.

=== Emelec ===
In May 2025, he left Cienciano and signed with Emelec in Ecuador.

=== Juan Pablo II College ===
In December 2025 Cueva returned to Peru and signed with Juan Pablo II College, to play in the 2026 Peruvian championship.

== International career ==
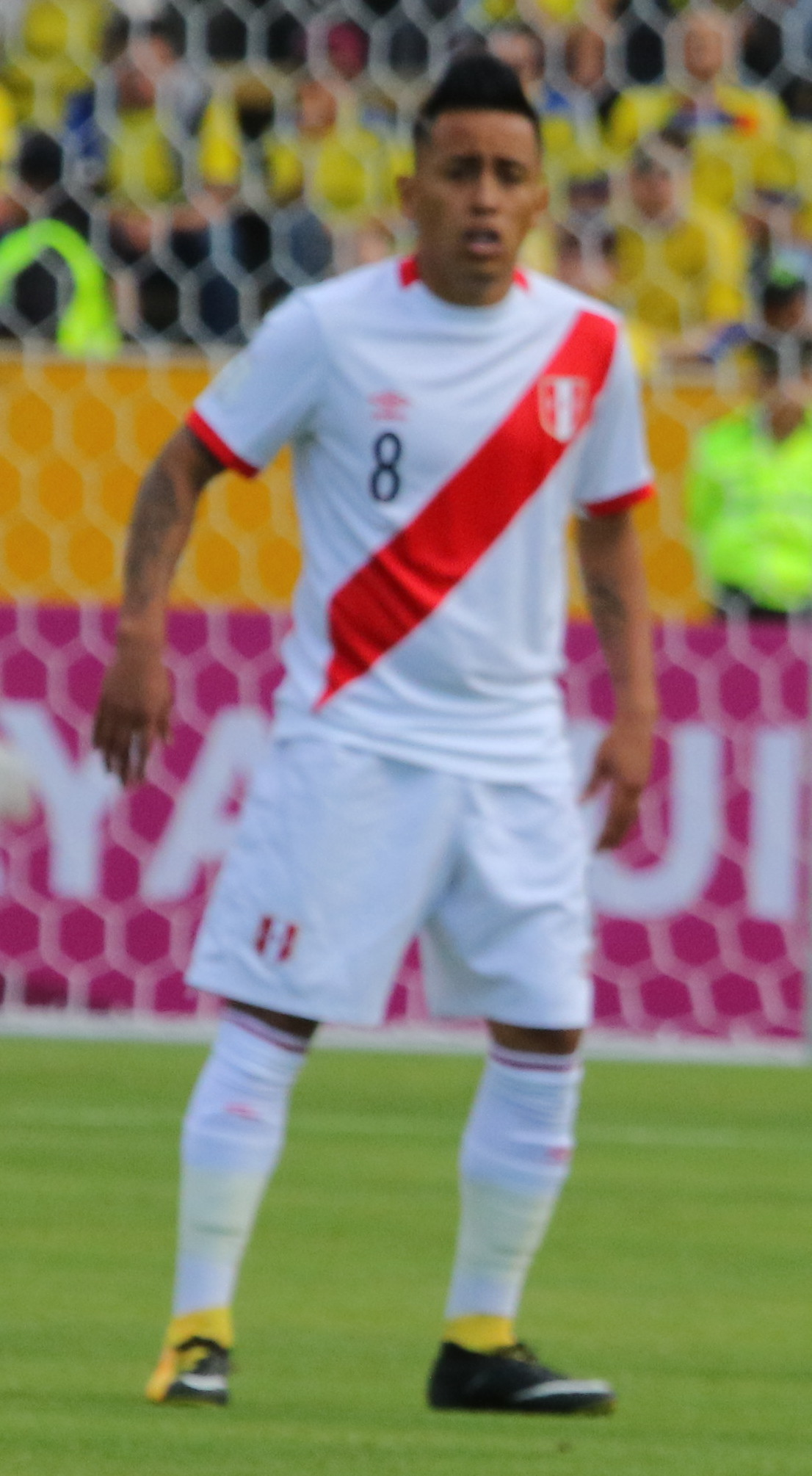
Cueva at the 2018 FIFA World Cup

Cueva represented Peru at under-20 level in the 2011 South American Youth Championship. He made his full international debut on 1 June 2011, starting in a 0–0 draw against Japan, for the year's Kirin Cup.

Cueva was included in Peru's squad for the 2015 Copa América, and scored the team's opening goal of the tournament in a 2–1 loss to Brazil. He was an undisputed starter during the tournament, helping his side finish in the third place and being named one of the best midfielders of the competition.

Cueva was also named in Ricardo Gareca's squad for the Copa América Centenario, and scored the opening goal in an eventual 2–2 draw against Ecuador at University of Phoenix Stadium on 8 June 2016. However, in the quarter-finals against Colombia, the match went to a penalty shoot-out, and Cueva missed his spot kick as his side were eliminated 4–2 as a result of this. He was also a first-choice during the 2018 FIFA World Cup qualifiers, helping his side qualify to the final stage after a 36-year absence. On 4 June 2018, Cueva was named in Peru's provisional 23-man squad for the World Cup in Russia.

On 30 May 2019, he was selected in the Peruvian squad for the 2019 Copa América. He featured in the tournament's final which resulted in a 3–1 defeat against the host nation Brazil. On 10 June 2021, he was called up for the 2021 Copa América, where his country managed to reach the semi-finals of the competition.

On 15 June 2024, he was included in the 26-man squad for the 2024 Copa América. On 29 June, he earned his 100th international cap in a 2–0 defeat against Argentina in the last group stage match of the tournament.

== Style of play ==
With Peru, Cueva usually plays in an offensive midfield role through the centre of the pitch, for his club sides, such as Toluca, he plays more frequently on the flank, mainly on the left wing. A good dribbler, he is known for his change of pace over short distances and his ability to manage himself well in tight spaces. His playing style has drawn comparisons with that of Brazilian playmaker Paulo Henrique Ganso, who plays for Sevilla, as Cueva occupies a similar function for São Paulo, in the way that he tends to move more through the pitch, making attacking runs into the rival area, scoring goals, and occasionally also helping out defensively by marking opponents. In his side's 4–0 victory against rivals Corinthians on 5 November 2016, Cueva demonstrated his great talent by netting a goal and providing three assists for his teammates David Neres, Chávez and Luiz Araújo.

== Career statistics ==
=== Club ===
As of 6 December 2025

Appearances and goals by club, season and competition
| Club | Season | League | | | Cup | | Continental | | Other | | Total | |
| Club | Season | Division | Apps | Goals | Apps | Goals | Apps | Goals | Apps | Goals | Apps | Goals |
|---|---|---|---|---|---|---|---|---|---|---|---|---|
| USMP | 2008 | Torneo Descentralizado | 18 | 2 | — | | — | | — | | 18 | 2 |
| USMP | 2009 | Torneo Descentralizado | 16 | 3 | — | | — | | — | | 16 | 3 |
| USMP | 2010 | Torneo Descentralizado | 37 | 5 | — | | 3 (Note: Appearance(s) in Copa Sudamericana) | 0 | — | | 40 | 5 |
| USMP | 2011 | Torneo Descentralizado | 26 | 4 | — | | 5 (Note: Appearance(s) in Copa Libertadores) | 0 | — | | 31 | 4 |
| USMP | 2012 | Torneo Descentralizado | 24 | 5 | — | | 1 | 0 | — | | 25 | 5 |
| USMP | Total | | 121 | 19 | — | | 9 | 0 | — | | 130 | 19 |
| UCV | 2012 | Torneo Descentralizado | 5 | 0 | — | | — | | — | | 5 | 0 |
| Unión Española B | 2013 | Segunda División Profesional | 2 | 0 | — | | — | | — | | 2 | 0 |
| Unión Española | 2013 | Primera División | 16 | 0 | 1 | 0 | — | | — | | 17 | 0 |
| Rayo Vallecano | 2013–14 | La Liga | 1 | 0 | 1 | 0 | — | | — | | 2 | 0 |
| Rayo Vallecano B | 2013–14 | Tercera División | 8 | 5 | — | | — | | — | | 8 | 5 |
| Alianza Lima | 2014 | Torneo Descentralizado | 15 | 3 | — | | — | | — | | 15 | 3 |
| Alianza Lima | 2015 | Torneo Descentralizado | 4 | 0 | 10 | 7 | 2 | 0 | — | | 16 | 7 |
| Alianza Lima | Total | | 19 | 3 | 10 | 7 | 2 | 0 | — | | 31 | 10 |
| Toluca | 2015–16 | Liga MX | 36 | 4 | 6 | 2 | 7 | 0 | — | | 49 | 6 |
| São Paulo | 2016 | Série A | 24 | 7 | 2 | 0 | — | | — | | 26 | 7 |
| São Paulo | 2017 | Série A | 28 | 3 | 5 | 2 | 1 | 0 | 9 (Note: Appearance(s) in Campeonato Paulista) | 5 | 43 | 10 |
| São Paulo | 2018 | Série A | 3 | 0 | 5 | 1 | 1 | 0 | 9 | 2 | 18 | 3 |
| São Paulo | Total | | 55 | 10 | 12 | 3 | 2 | 0 | 18 | 7 | 87 | 20 |
| Krasnodar | 2018–19 | Russian Premier League | 15 | 0 | 2 | 1 | 6 (Note: Appearance(s) in UEFA Europa League) | 0 | — | | 23 | 1 |
| Santos (loan) | 2019 | Série A | 5 | 0 | 3 | 0 | — | | 8 | 0 | 16 | 0 |
| Pachuca | 2019–20 | Liga MX | 2 | 0 | 1 | 0 | — | | 0 | 0 | 3 | 0 |
| Yeni Malatyaspor | 2020–21 | Süper Lig | 8 | 0 | 0 | 0 | — | | 0 | 0 | 8 | 0 |
| Al Fateh | 2020–21 | Saudi Pro League | 15 | 8 | 2 | 0 | — | | — | | 17 | 8 |
| Al Fateh | 2021–22 | Saudi Pro League | 24 | 8 | 1 | 0 | 0 | 0 | 0 | 0 | 25 | 8 |
| Al Fateh | 2022–23 | Saudi Pro League | 9 | 0 | 0 | 0 | 0 | 0 | 0 | 0 | 9 | 0 |
| Al Fateh | Total | | 48 | 16 | 3 | 0 | 0 | 0 | 0 | 0 | 51 | 16 |
| Alianza Lima (loan) | 2023 | Liga 1 | 22 | 0 | 0 | 0 | 5 | 0 | 0 | 0 | 27 | 0 |
| Cienciano | 2024 | Liga 1 | 8 | 1 | 0 | 0 | — | | — | | 8 | 1 |
| Cienciano | 2025 | Liga 1 | 10 | 5 | 0 | 0 | 5 | 1 | 0 | 0 | 15 | 6 |
| Cienciano | Total | | 18 | 6 | 0 | 0 | 5 | 1 | 0 | 0 | 23 | 7 |
| C.S. Emelec | 2025 | LigaPro Serie A | 15 | 2 | 0 | 0 | — | | — | | 15 | 2 |
| Career total | | | 396 | 65 | 39 | 13 | 36 | 1 | 26 | 7 | 497 | 86 |

=== International ===
As of match played 29 June 2024

Appearances and goals by national team and year
| National team | Year | Apps | Goals |
|---|---|---|---|
| Peru | 2011 | 2 | 0 |
| Peru | 2012 | 4 | 0 |
| Peru | 2013 | 0 | 0 |
| Peru | 2014 | 0 | 0 |
| Peru | 2015 | 13 | 1 |
| Peru | 2016 | 13 | 5 |
| Peru | 2017 | 9 | 1 |
| Peru | 2018 | 11 | 1 |
| Peru | 2019 | 14 | 2 |
| Peru | 2020 | 4 | 0 |
| Peru | 2021 | 17 | 5 |
| Peru | 2022 | 9 | 1 |
| Peru | 2023 | 2 | 0 |
| Peru | 2024 | 2 | 0 |
| Total | | 100 | 16 |

As of match played 27 September 2022
Scores and results list Peru's goal tally first, score column indicates score after each Cueva goal.

List of international goals scored by Christian Cueva
| No. | Date | Venue | Cap | Opponent | Score | Result | Competition |
|---|---|---|---|---|---|---|---|
| 1 | 14 June 2015 | Estadio Municipal Germán Becker, Temuco, Chile | 9 | Brazil | 1–0 | 1–2 | 2015 Copa América |
| 2 | 23 May 2016 | Estadio Nacional, Lima, Peru | 22 | Trinidad and Tobago | 1–0 | 4–0 | Friendly |
| 3 | 8 June 2016 | University of Phoenix Stadium, Glendale, United States | 24 | Ecuador | 1–0 | 2–2 | Copa América Centenario |
| 4 | 6 September 2016 | Estadio Nacional, Lima, Peru | 28 | Ecuador | 1–0 | 2–1 | 2018 FIFA World Cup qualification |
| 5 | 6 October 2016 | Estadio Nacional, Lima, Peru | 29 | Argentina | 2–2 | 2–2 | 2018 FIFA World Cup qualification |
| 6 | 10 November 2016 | Estadio Defensores del Chaco, Asunción, Paraguay | 31 | Paraguay | 3–1 | 4–1 | 2018 FIFA World Cup qualification |
| 7 | 31 August 2017 | Estadio Monumental, Lima, Peru | 37 | Bolivia | 2–0 | 2–1 | 2018 FIFA World Cup qualification |
| 8 | 29 May 2018 | Estadio Nacional, Lima, Peru | 44 | Scotland | 1–0 | 2–0 | Friendly |
| 9 | 22 March 2019 | Red Bull Area, Harrison, United States | 53 | Paraguay | 1–0 | 1–0 | Friendly |
| 10 | 5 June 2019 | Estadio Monumental, Lima, Peru | 55 | Costa Rica | 1–0 | 1–0 | Friendly |
| 11 | 8 June 2021 | Estadio Rodrigo Paz Delgado, Quito, Ecuador | 72 | Ecuador | 1–0 | 2–1 | 2022 FIFA World Cup qualification |
| 12 | 5 September 2021 | Estadio Nacional, Lima, Peru | 81 | Venezuela | 1–0 | 1–0 | 2022 FIFA World Cup qualification |
| 13 | 7 October 2021 | Estadio Nacional, Lima, Peru | 83 | Chile | 1–0 | 2–0 | 2022 FIFA World Cup qualification |
| 14 | 11 November 2021 | Estadio Nacional, Lima, Peru | 86 | Bolivia | 2–0 | 3–0 | 2022 FIFA World Cup qualification |
| 15 | 16 November 2021 | Estadio Olímpico de la UCV, Caracas, Venezuela | 87 | Venezuela | 2–1 | 2–1 | 2022 FIFA World Cup qualification |
| 16 | 27 September 2022 | Audi Field, Washington, D.C., United States | 94 | El Salvador | 4–1 | 4–1 | Friendly |

== Honours ==
Universidad San Martín

- Torneo Descentralizado: 2008, 2010

Unión Española

- Primera División de Chile: 2013

Individual

- Copa América Team of the Tournament: 2015
- Campeonato Paulista Team of the year: 2017

== Personal life ==
Cueva's wife filed a complaint against him, making allegations of violence.

== See also ==
- List of men's footballers with 100 or more international caps
