= Tawfiq Buhimed =

Saudi Arabian footballer

Personal information
- Full name: Tawfiq Hejji Hussain Buhimed
- Date of birth: 29 October 1987 (age 39)
- Place of birth: Al-Hasa, Saudi Arabia
- Height: 1.79 m (5 ft 10 in)
- Positions: Full-back; winger

Team information
- Current team: Al-Adalah
- Number: 25

Youth career
- 2006–2008: Al-Qarah

Senior career*
Years	Team	Apps	(Gls)
2008–2013	Hajer		
2013–2014	Al-Ettifaq	3	(1)
2014–2017	Al-Fateh	62	(5)
2017–2019	Al-Fayha	30	(1)
2019–2024	Al-Fateh	125	(4)
2024–	Al-Adalah	0	(0)
- * Club domestic league appearances and goals as of 18 April 2024

Tawfiq Buhimed (Arabic: توفيق بو حيمد; born 29 October 1987) is a professional football winger and full-back for Al-Adalah.
