= Saleh Al-Nashmi =

Saudi Arabian footballer

Saleh Al-Nashmi صالح النشمي
Personal information
- Full name: Saleh Jumaa Al-Nashmi
- Date of birth: 26 December 1995 (age 30)
- Place of birth: Al-Hasa, Saudi Arabia
- Height: 1.62 m (5 ft 4 in)
- Position: Right back

Team information
- Current team: Al-Shoulla
- Number: 26

Youth career
- –2017: Al-Fateh

Senior career*
Years	Team	Apps	(Gls)
2017–2018	Al-Fateh	0	(0)
2018–2020	Al-Thoqbah	43	(1)
2020–2022	Al-Fateh	14	(0)
2022–2023	Al-Sahel	23	(0)
2023–2025	Al-Safa	34	(1)
2025–	Al-Shoulla		
- * Club domestic league appearances and goals

Saleh Al-Nashmi (Arabic: صالح النشمي; born 26 December 1995) is a Saudi Arabian professional footballer who plays as a right back for Al-Shoulla.

== Career ==
Al-Nashmi started his career at the youth team of Al-Fateh and represented the club at every level. On 31 August 2018, Al-Nashmi joined Al-Thoqbah. On 18 September 2020, Al-Nashmi returned to Al-Fateh on a three-year deal. On 25 July 2022, Al-Nashmi was released from his contract by Al-Fateh. Following his release from Al-Fateh, Al-Nashmi joined First Division side Al-Sahel on 5 August 2022. On 3 September 2023, Al-Nashmi joined Al Safa. On 28 September 2025, Al-Nashmi joined Al-Shoulla.
