= 2023–24 Al-Fateh SC season =

Al-Fateh
2023–24 season
- President: Mansour Al-Afaliq
- Manager: Slaven Bilić
- Stadium: Prince Abdullah bin Jalawi Stadium
- SPL: 7th
- King Cup: Round of 16 (knocked out by Al-Shabab)
- Top goalscorer: League: Cristian Tello (11 goals); All: Cristian Tello (12 goals)
- Highest home attendance: 18,097 (vs. Al-Hilal, 3 November 2023)
- Lowest home attendance: 2,885 (vs. Al-Wehda, 30 September 2023)
- Average home league attendance: 8,234
- All statistics correct as of 27 May 2024.

The 2023–24 season was Al-Fateh's 15th consecutive season in the Pro League and their 66th year in existence. The club participated in the Pro League and the King Cup.

The season covers the period from 1 July 2023 to 30 June 2024.

== Players ==
=== Squad information ===
As of 1 February 2024

Note: Flags indicate national team as defined under FIFA eligibility rules; some limited exceptions apply. Players may hold more than one non-FIFA nationality.

No.	Pos.	Nation	Player
1	GK	SWE	Jacob Rinne
2	DF	KSA	Ali Al-Zubaidi
5	DF	KSA	Fahad Al-Harbi
7	MF	KSA	Mukhtar Ali (on loan from Al-Nassr)
8	MF	KSA	Nooh Al-Mousa
10	MF	ARM	Lucas Zelarayán
11	MF	MAR	Mourad Batna
12	DF	KSA	Saeed Baattiah
13	DF	KSA	Meshal Al-Hamdan
14	MF	KSA	Mohammed Al-Fuhaid (captain)
15	MF	KSA	Hassan Al-Mohammed
17	DF	MAR	Marwane Saâdane
18	MF	KSA	Mohammed Al-Saeed
20	FW	KSA	Abdullah Al-Mogren
21	FW	CPV	Djaniny
24	DF	KSA	Ammar Al-Daheem

No.	Pos.	Nation	Player
25	DF	KSA	Tawfiq Buhimed (vice-captain)
28	MF	ALG	Sofiane Bendebka
29	FW	KSA	Ali Al-Masoud
37	MF	ESP	Cristian Tello
40	GK	KSA	Sattam Al-Subaie
42	DF	KSA	Ahmed Al-Julaydan
49	FW	KSA	Saad Al-Shurafa
55	GK	KSA	Waleed Al-Enezi
64	DF	BEL	Jason Denayer
66	MF	KSA	Abbas Al-Hassan
70	MF	AUS	Jordan Harrison
77	FW	KSA	Ali Al-Jassem
83	DF	KSA	Salem Al-Najdi
87	DF	KSA	Qassem Lajami
88	MF	KSA	Othman Al-Othman
94	MF	KSA	Abdullah Al-Enezi

=== Out on loan ===
Note: Flags indicate national team as defined under FIFA eligibility rules; some limited exceptions apply. Players may hold more than one non-FIFA nationality.

No.	Pos.	Nation	Player
3	DF	KSA	Ziyad Al-Jari (at Al-Orobah until 30 June 2024)
26	GK	KSA	Mustafa Malayekah (at Al-Shabab until 30 June 2024)
30	MF	KSA	Osama Al-Mobairik (at Al-Rawdhah until 30 June 2024)

No.	Pos.	Nation	Player
38	MF	KSA	Loay Al-Johani (at Al-Qaisumah until 30 June 2024)
99	FW	KSA	Hassan Al Salis (at Al-Orobah until 30 June 2024)

== Transfers and loans ==
=== Transfers in ===
Entry date	Position	No.	Player	From club	Fee	Ref.
30 June 2023	DF	5	(Saudi Arabia) Fahad Al-Harbi	(Saudi Arabia) Al-Adalah	End of loan	
30 June 2023	DF	23	(Saudi Arabia) Abdullah Al-Yousef	(Saudi Arabia) Al-Batin	End of loan	
30 June 2023	MF	–	(Saudi Arabia) Hassan Al-Habib	(Saudi Arabia) Al-Adalah	End of loan	
1 July 2023	DF	12	(Saudi Arabia) Saeed Baattiah	(Saudi Arabia) Jeddah	Free	
23 July 2023	DF	64	(Belgium) Jason Denayer	(United Arab Emirates) Shabab Al Ahli	Free	
29 July 2023	MF	70	(Australia) Jordan Harrison	(England) Watford	Free	
31 July 2023	MF	10	(Armenia) Lucas Zelarayán	(United States) Columbus Crew	$3,000,000	
7 September 2023	FW	20	(Saudi Arabia) Abdullah Al-Mogren	(Saudi Arabia) Al-Ahli	$1,333,000	
7 September 2023	FW	21	(Cape Verde) Djaniny	(Turkey) Trabzonspor	$1,100,000	

=== Loans in ===
Start date	End date	Position	No.	Player	From club	Fee	Ref.
7 September 2023	End of season	MF	7	(Saudi Arabia) Mukhtar Ali	(Saudi Arabia) Al-Nassr	None	

=== Transfers out ===
Exit date	Position	No.	Player	To club	Fee	Ref.
30 June 2023	MF	19	(Saudi Arabia) Khalid Al-Ghannam	(Saudi Arabia) Al-Nassr	End of loan	
17 July 2023	MF	91	(France) Tristan Dingomé		Released	
24 July 2023	MF	7	(Saudi Arabia) Ayman Al-Khulaif	(Saudi Arabia) Al-Qadsiah	Undisclosed	
19 August 2023	MF	–	(Saudi Arabia) Hassan Al-Habib	(Saudi Arabia) Al-Okhdood	Free	
3 September 2023	FW	9	(Saudi Arabia) Firas Al-Buraikan	(Saudi Arabia) Al-Ahli	$10,600,000	
8 September 2023	DF	4	(Spain) Fran Vélez	(Greece) Aris	Free	
8 September 2023	DF	23	(Saudi Arabia) Abdullah Al-Yousef	(Saudi Arabia) Al-Raed	Undisclosed	
9 September 2023	MF	8	(Saudi Arabia) Housain Al-Mogahwi	(Saudi Arabia) Al-Adalah	Free	
18 September 2023	MF	6	(Brazil) Petros	(Saudi Arabia) Al-Suqoor	Free	

=== Loans out ===
Start date	End date	Position	No.	Player	To club	Fee	Ref.
13 August 2023	End of season	MF	38	(Saudi Arabia) Loay Al-Johani	(Saudi Arabia) Al-Qaisumah	None	
29 August 2023	End of season	MF	30	(Saudi Arabia) Osama Al-Mobairik	(Saudi Arabia) Al-Rawdhah	None	
30 January 2024	End of season	GK	26	(Saudi Arabia) Mustafa Malayekah	(Saudi Arabia) Al-Shabab	None	
31 January 2024	End of season	DF	3	(Saudi Arabia) Ziyad Al-Jari	(Saudi Arabia) Al-Orobah	None	
31 January 2024	End of season	FW	99	(Saudi Arabia) Hassan Al Salis	(Saudi Arabia) Al-Orobah	None	

== Pre-season ==
19 July 2023 Friendly	Al-Fateh (Saudi Arabia)	0–0	(Hungary) Puskás Akadémia	Wartberg ob der Aist, Austria
18:00 CEST		Report		Stadium: Aist Stadion

21 July 2023 Friendly	Al-Fateh (Saudi Arabia)	1–0	(Hungary) Újpest	Wartberg ob der Aist, Austria
15:00 CEST	Bendebka 25'	Report		Stadium: Aist Stadion

25 July 2023 Friendly	Al-Fateh (Saudi Arabia)	1–0	(Cyprus) Pafos	Salzburg, Austria
18:00 CEST	Al-Hassan 17'	Report		Stadium: Sportzentrum Salzburg Mitte

8 August 2023 Friendly	Al-Fateh (Saudi Arabia)	2–1	Qatar SC	Al-Hasa, Saudi Arabia
20:30 AST	Lajami; Batna	Report	Benoun	Stadium: Prince Abdullah bin Jalawi Stadium

== Competitions ==
=== Overview ===
Competition	Record							
Competition	G	W	D	L	GF	GA	GD	Win %
Pro League	34	12	9	13	57	55	+2	35.29
King Cup	2	1	0	1	4	3	+1	50.00
Total	36	13	9	14	61	58	+3	36.11

Updated to match played 27 May 2024
Source: Competitions

=== Pro League ===
==== League table ====
Pos	Team	Pld	W	D	L	GF	GA	GD	Pts	Qualification or relegation
5	Al-Ittihad	34	16	6	12	63	54	+9	54	
6	Al-Ettifaq	34	12	12	10	43	34	+9	48	Qualification for the AGCFF Gulf Club Champions League group stage
7	Al-Fateh	34	12	9	13	57	55	+2	45	
8	Al-Shabab	34	12	8	14	45	42	+3	44 (Note: Al-Shabab finished ahead of Al-Fayha on overall goal difference: Al-Shabab +3, Al-Fayha −8 (Al-Fayha 0–1 Al-Shabab, Al-Shabab 2–3 Al-Fayha).)	
9	Al-Fayha	34	11	11	12	44	52	−8	44	

Source: SPL
Rules for classification: 1) Points; 2) Head-to-head points; 3) Head-to-head goal difference; 4) Total goal difference; 5) Total goals scored; 6) Fair-play points
(Note: Head-to-head record is used only after all the matches between the teams in question have been played).

==== Results summary ====
Overall								Home						Away					
Pld	W	D	L	GF	GA	GD	Pts	W	D	L	GF	GA	GD	W	D	L	GF	GA	GD
34	12	9	13	57	55	+2	45	6	5	6	28	25	+3	6	4	7	29	30	−1

Last updated: 27 May 2024.
Source: spl.com.sa

==== Results by round ====
Round	1	2	3	4	5	6	7	8	9	10	11	12	13	14	15	16	17	18	19	20	21	22	23	24	25	26	27	28	29	30	31	32	33	34
Ground	H	A	H	A	H	A	A	H	A	H	A	H	A	H	H	A	H	A	H	A	H	A	H	H	A	H	A	H	A	H	A	A	H	A
Result	D	W	L	D	W	W	L	W	W	W	W	L	D	L	L	L	D	W	D	L	D	D	L	L	W	W	L	W	L	D	D	L	W	L
Position	10	4	8	10	7	7	8	7	6	6	4	5	6	6	6	7	7	7	7	7	7	7	8	9	8	6	7	6	7	7	7	8	7	7

Updated to match(es) played on 27 May 2024. Source: spl.com.sa
A = Away; H = Home; W = Win; D = Draw; L = Loss

==== Matches ====
All times are local, AST (UTC+3).

Win Draw Loss Postponed

13 August 2023 1	Al-Fateh	1–1	Al-Taawoun	Al-Hasa
21:00	Al-Buraikan 24'; Al-Zubaidi (yellow card) 57'; Al-Fuhaid (yellow card) 90+8'	Report	El Mahdioui (yellow card) 38'; Lajami 45+1' (o.g.); Al-Oyayari (yellow card) 87'	Stadium: Prince Abdullah bin Jalawi Stadium; Attendance: 5,242; Referee: Sami Al-Jires

18 August 2023 2	Al-Okhdood	1–3	Al-Fateh	Najran
18:00	Tănase (yellow card) 9', (goal) 23'; Al-Shaikh (yellow card) 29'; Collado (yellow card) 54' (yellow-red card) 71'	Report	Batna 36'; Tello 45+2' (pen.), 90+2'; Al-Yousef (yellow card) 45+7'	Stadium: Prince Hathloul bin Abdul Aziz Sports City; Attendance: 1,255; Referee: Abdullah Al-Shehri

25 August 2023 3	Al-Fateh	0–5	Al-Nassr	Al-Hasa
21:00	Al-Hassan (yellow card) 63'	Report	Mané 27', 81'; Ronaldo 38', 55', 90+6'; Brozović (yellow card) 52'	Stadium: Prince Abdullah bin Jalawi Stadium; Attendance: 13,544; Referee: Abdullah Al-Harbi

29 August 2023 4	Damac	2–2	Al-Fateh	Khamis Mushait
18:00	Ceesay 23' (pen.), 45+3'; Al-Ammar (yellow card) 32'; Munshi (yellow card) 42'	Report	Al-Buraikan 61', 90+3'; Petros (yellow card) 90+6'	Stadium: Damac Club Stadium; Attendance: 1,118; Referee: Khaled Al-Teris

2 September 2023 5	Al-Fateh	5–1	Al-Ahli	Al-Hasa
21:00	Al-Buraikan 21' (pen.); Al-Fuhaid (yellow card) 45+1'; Petros (yellow card) 45+10'; Zelarayán 58'; Batna 89' (pen.), 90+3', (yellow card) 90+2'; Bendebka 90+14' (pen.)	Report	Al-Hassan 6' (o.g.); Mahrez (yellow card) 45+9'; Demiral (yellow card) 82' (yellow-red card) 90+12'; Ibañez (yellow card) 87'	Stadium: Prince Abdullah bin Jalawi Stadium; Attendance: 11,715; Referee: Fábio Veríssimo (Portugal)

15 September 2023 6	Al-Khaleej	1–3	Al-Fateh	Dammam
21:00	Rebocho (yellow card) 42'; Martins 82'	Report	Batna 10', 13'; Ali (yellow card) 58' (yellow-red card) 81'; Bendebka 66'	Stadium: Prince Mohamed bin Fahd Stadium; Attendance: 2,276; Referee: Mohammed Al-Beredi

21 September 2023 7	Al-Ittihad	2–1	Al-Fateh	Jeddah
21:00	Kadesh (yellow card) 12'; Romarinho 38', (yellow card) 53'; Kanté 45+1'; Al-Olayan (yellow card) 90+5'	Report	Al-Hassan (yellow card) 9'; Saâdane 30', (yellow card) 67'; Al-Saeed (yellow card) 82'	Stadium: Prince Abdullah Al Faisal Stadium; Attendance: 15,209; Referee: Daniele Orsato (Italy)

30 September 2023 8	Al-Fateh	5–1	Al-Wehda	Al-Hasa
18:00	Saâdane (yellow card) 26'; Tello 45+5', 89', 90+2'; Batna 67'; Djaniny 86'	Report	Goodwin 21'; Anselmo (yellow card) 23'; Bakshween (yellow card) 44'	Stadium: Prince Abdullah bin Jalawi Stadium; Attendance: 2,885; Referee: Mamdouh Al Shahdan

5 October 2023 9	Al-Ettifaq	1–2	Al-Fateh	Dammam
21:00	Dembélé 64', (yellow card) 90+4'; Gray (yellow card) 90+9'	Report	Zelarayán 85'; Djaniny 90+3'; Al-Zubaidi (yellow card) 90+12'	Stadium: Prince Mohamed bin Fahd Stadium; Attendance: 9,827; Referee: Abdulsamad Bakri

20 October 2023 10	Al-Fateh	4–1	Abha	Al-Hasa
21:00	Batna 21'; Denayer (yellow card) 45+1'; Djaniny 45+4'; Zelarayán 70'; Saâdane (yellow card) 90+2'; Al-Hassan 90+10'	Report	Sami 55'; Al-Habib (yellow card) 73'; Al-Sahafi (yellow card) 90+1'	Stadium: Prince Abdullah bin Jalawi Stadium; Attendance: 9,852; Referee: Mohammed Al-Harbi

27 October 2023 11	Al-Raed	1–2	Al-Fateh	Buraidah
18:00	Normann (yellow card) 24'; Al-Jayzani (yellow card) 57'; Al-Beshe (yellow card) 62'; El Berkaoui 69' (pen.); M. Al-Dossari (yellow card) 80'	Report	Buhimed 28'; Al-Mogren (yellow card) 30'; Tello 45+3'; Al-Zubaidi (yellow card) 75'; Rinne (yellow card) 90+5'	Stadium: King Abdullah Sport City Stadium; Attendance: 2,220; Referee: Raed Al-Zahrani

3 November 2023 12	Al-Fateh	0–2	Al-Hilal	Al-Hasa
18:00	Al-Masoud (yellow card) 90+1'	Report	Mitrović 5' (pen.); Koulibaly (yellow card) 26'; Al-Bulaihi (yellow card) 34'; Bounou (yellow card) 45+3'; Neves (yellow card) 66'; S. Al-Dawsari 90+3'	Stadium: Prince Abdullah bin Jalawi Stadium; Attendance: 18,097; Referee: Saíd Martínez (Honduras)

9 November 2023 13	Al-Riyadh	1–1	Al-Fateh	Riyadh
21:00	Al-Khaibari (yellow card) 29'; Al Abbas 68'; Al-Rashidi (yellow card) 90+7'	Report	Al-Hassan 34'; Saâdane (red card) 35'; Baattiah (yellow card) 45+3'; Rinne (yellow card) 79'; Ali (yellow card) 90+9'	Stadium: King Fahd International Stadium; Attendance: 397; Referee: Abdallah Al-Shehri

25 November 2023 14	Al-Fateh	0–1	Al-Fayha	Al-Hasa
21:00	Bendebka (yellow card) 30'; Baattiah (yellow card) 45+2'	Report	Nwakaeme 39'; Stojković (yellow card) 88'; Haqawi (yellow card) 90+1'	Stadium: Al-Fateh Club Stadium; Attendance: 10,815; Referee: Fareeh Al-Jaloud

2 December 2023 15	Al-Fateh	0–1	Al-Tai	Al-Hasa
18:00	Al-Najdi (yellow card) 46'; Ali (yellow card) 68'; Batna (yellow card) 84'; Denayer (yellow card) 85'	Report	Mensah (yellow card) 21', (goal) 87' (pen.); Al-Nakhli (yellow card) 35'; Bauer (yellow card) 66'; Al-Harabi (yellow card) 90+10'	Stadium: Al-Fateh Club Stadium; Attendance: 7,471; Referee: Faisal Al-Blwi

7 December 2023 16	Al-Hazem	2–0	Al-Fateh	Ar Rass
18:00	Viana 5'; Tozé 14' (pen.), (yellow card) 90+7'; Al-Mousa (yellow card) 88'; Al-Bakr (yellow card) 90'	Report	Saâdane (yellow card) 49'	Stadium: Al-Hazem Club Stadium; Attendance: 640; Referee: Ahmed Al-Rumaikhani

15 December 2023 17	Al-Fateh	1–1	Al-Shabab	Al-Hasa
18:00	Batna 15'; Al-Hassan (yellow card) 64'; Al-Fuhaid (yellow card) 66'; Zelarayán (yellow card) 79'	Report	Santos (yellow card) 32'; Al-Harbi (yellow card) 45+5'; Radif 58'; Al-Sharari (yellow card) 90+4'	Stadium: Al-Fateh Club Stadium; Attendance: 6,402; Referee: Mamdouh Al Shahdan

23 December 2023 18	Al-Taawoun	1–3	Al-Fateh	Buraidah
18:00	Al-Abdulrazzaq (yellow card) 29'; Adam (yellow card) 54'; Pedro 90+4'	Report	Al-Masoud (yellow card) 27'; Al-Najdi 30'; Al-Shurafa 35', 45+2'; Bendebka (yellow card) 41'; Saâdane (yellow card) 90'; Baattiah (yellow card) 90+6'	Stadium: Al-Taawoun Club Stadium; Attendance: 3,494; Referee: Abdullah Al-Shehri

30 December 2023 19	Al-Fateh	0–0	Al-Okhdood	Al-Hasa
18:00	Baattiah (yellow card) 34'; Al-Fuhaid (yellow card) 74'	Report	Al-Muwallad (yellow card) 10'; Al-Zabdani (yellow card) 43'; Tawamba (yellow card) 62'; Al-Harthi (yellow card) 74'	Stadium: Al-Fateh Club Stadium; Attendance: 5,973; Referee: Majed Al-Shamrani

17 February 2024 20	Al-Nassr	2–1	Al-Fateh	Riyadh
20:00	Brozović (yellow card) 14'; Ronaldo 17'; Otávio 72'	Report	Al-Najdi 29', (yellow card) 30'; Batna (yellow card) 53'; Tello (yellow card) 78'; Saâdane (yellow card) 79'	Stadium: Al-Awwal Park; Attendance: 15,803; Referee: Sami Al-Jires

23 February 2024 21	Al-Fateh	1–1	Damac	Al-Hasa
20:00	Bendebka 52', (yellow card) 64'; Zelarayán (yellow card) 78'	Report	Nkoudou 65'	Stadium: Al-Fateh Club Stadium; Attendance: 7,865; Referee: Faisal Al-Blwi

2 March 2024 22	Al-Ahli	1–1	Al-Fateh	Jeddah
20:00	Ibañez (yellow card) 10' (yellow-red card) 14'; Kessié (yellow card) 63'; Saint-Maximin 75'	Report	Al-Najdi (yellow card) 27'; Baattiah (yellow card) 41' (yellow-red card) 89'; Tello 45+8'; Lajami (yellow card) 90+9'	Stadium: King Abdullah Sports City; Attendance: 44,137; Referee: Majed Al-Shamrani

9 March 2024 23	Al-Fateh	1–2	Al-Khaleej	Al-Hasa
17:00	Al-Daheem (yellow card) 58'; Saâdane 82'	Report	Jung Woo-young (yellow card) 10'; Narey 45+1'; López 59'	Stadium: Al-Fateh Club Stadium; Attendance: 6,848; Referee: Mohammed Al-Harbi

16 March 2024 24	Al-Fateh	2–4	Al-Ittihad	Al-Hasa
22:00	Al-Najdi 6'; Al-Shurafa 66'; Ali (yellow card) 90+10'	Report	Hamdallah 39' (pen.), 74'; Jota 45+4'; Al-Olayan (yellow card) 49' (yellow-red card) 77'; A. Al-Ghamdi 64'; Z. Hawsawi (yellow card) 90+9'	Stadium: Al-Fateh Club Stadium; Attendance: 6,558; Referee: Sergei Karasev (Russia)

30 March 2024 25	Al-Wehda	2–3	Al-Fateh	Mecca
22:00	Al-Muwallad (yellow card) 37'; Anselmo 42', 51'; Fajr (yellow card) 89'; Bukhari (yellow card) 90'	Report	Tello 29', 68'; Al-Shurafa 73', (yellow card) 90+6'; Al-Mousa (red card) 90+12'	Stadium: King Abdul Aziz Stadium; Attendance: 365; Referee: Abdullah Al-Shehri

3 April 2024 26	Al-Fateh	1–0	Al-Ettifaq	Al-Hasa
22:00	Baattiah (yellow card) 63'; Zelarayán 80', (yellow card) 83'	Report		Stadium: Al-Fateh Club Stadium; Attendance: 8,327; Referee: Sultan Al-Harbi

7 April 2024 27	Abha	2–1	Al-Fateh	Abha
22:00	Krychowiak 6', 57'; Al-Zubaidi (yellow card) 10'; Al-Jumayah (yellow card) 33'; Kamano (yellow card) 90+4'	Report	Tello 54'	Stadium: Prince Sultan bin Abdul Aziz Stadium; Attendance: 679; Referee: Mohammed Al-Harbi

18 April 2024 28	Al-Fateh	3–1	Al-Raed	Al-Hasa
21:00	Djaniny 7', 60'; Zelarayán 12'; Saâdane (yellow card) 63'	Report	Loum (yellow card) 24'; Al-Jayzani (yellow card) 26'; Shami (yellow card) 39'; Tavares 56'; Hazazi (yellow card) 73'	Stadium: Al-Fateh Club Stadium; Attendance: 7,575; Referee: Mamdouh Al Shahdan

26 April 2024 29	Al-Hilal	3–1	Al-Fateh	Riyadh
18:00	Michael (yellow card) 33', (goal) 58'; N. Al-Dawsari (yellow card) 36'; Neves 74' (pen.); Al-Bulaihi 90+15'	Report	Baattiah (yellow card) 38'; Zelarayán 57', (yellow card) 73'; Tello (yellow card) 72'	Stadium: Kingdom Arena; Attendance: 16,978; Referee: Anastasios Sidiropoulos (Greece)

2 May 2024 30	Al-Fateh	2–2	Al-Riyadh	Al-Hasa
21:00	Djaniny 6'; Al-Othman (yellow card) 15'; Baattiah (yellow card) 57'; Zelarayán 80'; Saâdane (yellow card) 90+3'	Report	Al-Shuwayyi (red card) 54'; Al-Shuwayrikh 90+1'; Ndong 90+4'	Stadium: Al-Fateh Club Stadium; Attendance: 6,954; Referee: Abdullah Al-Kharboush

9 May 2024 31	Al-Fayha	2–2	Al-Fateh	Al Majma'ah
18:00	Sakala 29', (yellow card) 85'; Al-Khalaf (yellow card) 37'; Sabiri 69'	Report	Lajami (yellow card) 40'; Djaniny 47'; Bendebka 76'	Stadium: Al Majma'ah Sports City; Attendance: 445; Referee: Mohammed Abu Shaqarah

16 May 2024 32	Al-Tai	3–1	Al-Fateh	Ha'il
18:00	Bauer 12'; Mensah 83', 90+10'; Asiri (yellow card) 90+3'	Report	Djaniny 4'; Al-Zubaidi (yellow card) 45+6' (yellow-red card) 57'; Al-Harbi (yellow card) 90+7'	Stadium: Prince Abdul Aziz bin Musa'ed Stadium; Attendance: 8,897; Referee: Sultan Al-Harbi

23 May 2024 33	Al-Fateh	2–1	Al-Hazem	Al-Hasa
21:00	Tello 30'; Zelarayán 40'; Al-Najdi (yellow card) 90+2'	Report	Al-Harbi (yellow card) 16'; Tozé 22'; Al-Obaid (yellow card) 35'; Selemani (yellow card) 90+5'	Stadium: Al-Fateh Club Stadium; Attendance: 3,854; Referee: Fareeh Al-Jaloud

27 May 2024 34	Al-Shabab	3–2	Al-Fateh	Riyadh
21:00	Al-Sibyani 14', (red card) 59'; Radif (yellow card) 37'; Vitinho 72'; Al-Juwayr 89'	Report	Saâdane 51'; Denayer 90+3'; Al-Shurafa (yellow card) 90+7'	Stadium: Al-Shabab Club Stadium; Attendance: 6,546; Referee: Abdullah Al-Harbi

=== King Cup ===
All times are local, AST (UTC+3).

27 September 2023 Round of 32	Al-Fateh	3–1	Al-Okhdood	Al-Hasa
18:00	Batna 7' (pen.), 90+7'; Al-Saeed (yellow card) 25'; Saâdane (yellow card) 74'; Djaniny 81'	Report	Al Saleem (yellow card) 41'; Al Jahif (yellow card) 47'; Al Mansour (yellow card) 66'; Khodari 90+1'	Stadium: Prince Abdullah bin Jalawi Stadium; Referee: Mohammed Al-Beredi

31 October 2023 Round of 16	Al-Fateh	1–2 (a.e.t.)	Al-Shabab	Al-Hasa
15:15	Al-Fuhaid (yellow card) 16'; Tello 24'; Al-Mohammed (yellow card) 113'	Report	Bahebri (yellow card) 19'; Cuéllar (yellow card) 47'; Carrasco 59', 115', (yellow card) 118'; Al-Sibyani (yellow card) 110'; Kanabah (yellow card) 120+2'	Stadium: Prince Abdullah bin Jalawi Stadium; Attendance: 6,427; Referee: Sami Al-Jires

== Statistics ==
=== Appearances ===
Last updated on 27 May 2024.

No.	Pos	Nat	Player	Total		Pro League		King Cup	
No.	Pos	Nat	Player	Apps	Goals	Apps	Goals	Apps	Goals
Goalkeepers
1	GK	(Sweden) SWE	Jacob Rinne	35	0	33	0	2	0
40	GK	(Saudi Arabia) KSA	Sattam Al-Subaie	0	0	0	0	0	0
55	GK	(Saudi Arabia) KSA	Waleed Al-Enezi	0	0	0	0	0	0
Defenders
2	DF	(Saudi Arabia) KSA	Ali Al-Zubaidi	22	0	6+14	0	0+2	0
5	DF	(Saudi Arabia) KSA	Fahad Al-Harbi	14	0	8+5	0	1	0
12	DF	(Saudi Arabia) KSA	Saeed Baattiah	31	0	26+3	0	2	0
17	DF	(Morocco) MAR	Marwane Saâdane	29	3	27	3	2	0
24	DF	(Saudi Arabia) KSA	Ammar Al-Daheem	8	0	5+3	0	0	0
25	DF	(Saudi Arabia) KSA	Tawfiq Buhimed	22	1	16+5	1	0+1	0
42	DF	(Saudi Arabia) KSA	Ahmed Al-Julaydan	2	0	1+1	0	0	0
64	DF	(Belgium) BEL	Jason Denayer	22	1	20+1	1	1	0
83	DF	(Saudi Arabia) KSA	Salem Al-Najdi	26	3	13+11	3	1+1	0
87	DF	(Saudi Arabia) KSA	Qassem Lajami	22	0	17+4	0	1	0
Midfielders
7	MF	(Saudi Arabia) KSA	Mukhtar Ali	29	0	26+1	0	2	0
8	MF	(Saudi Arabia) KSA	Nooh Al-Mousa	9	0	0+8	0	0+1	0
10	MF	(Armenia) ARM	Lucas Zelarayán	32	8	30	8	2	0
11	MF	(Morocco) MAR	Mourad Batna	24	10	22	8	2	2
14	MF	(Saudi Arabia) KSA	Mohammed Al-Fuhaid	26	0	12+13	0	1	0
15	MF	(Saudi Arabia) KSA	Hassan Al-Mohammed	4	0	0+3	0	0+1	0
18	MF	(Saudi Arabia) KSA	Mohammed Al-Saeed	14	0	2+10	0	1+1	0
28	MF	(Algeria) ALG	Sofiane Bendebka	30	4	28+1	4	1	0
37	MF	(Spain) ESP	Cristian Tello	31	12	28+1	11	2	1
66	MF	(Saudi Arabia) KSA	Abbas Al-Hassan	27	2	13+12	2	1+1	0
88	MF	(Saudi Arabia) KSA	Othman Al-Othman	8	0	5+3	0	0	0
94	MF	(Saudi Arabia) KSA	Abdullah Al-Anazi	0	0	0	0	0	0
Forwards
20	FW	(Saudi Arabia) KSA	Abdullah Al-Mogren	9	0	5+3	0	0+1	0
21	FW	(Cape Verde) CPV	Djaniny	20	9	11+8	8	0+1	1
29	FW	(Saudi Arabia) KSA	Ali Al-Masoud	10	0	2+8	0	0	0
49	FW	(Saudi Arabia) KSA	Saad Al-Shurafa	15	4	3+12	4	0	0
77	FW	(Saudi Arabia) KSA	Ali Al-Jassem	0	0	0	0	0	0
Players sent out on loan this season
3	DF	(Saudi Arabia) KSA	Ziyad Al-Jari	1	0	0+1	0	0	0
26	GK	(Saudi Arabia) KSA	Mustafa Malayekah	1	0	1	0	0	0
99	FW	(Saudi Arabia) KSA	Hassan Al Salis	2	0	0+2	0	0	0
Player who made an appearance this season but have left the club
4	DF	(Spain) ESP	Fran Vélez	0	0	0	0	0	0
6	MF	(Brazil) BRA	Petros	5	0	5	0	0	0
9	FW	(Saudi Arabia) KSA	Firas Al-Buraikan	5	4	5	4	0	0
23	DF	(Saudi Arabia) KSA	Abdullah Al-Yousef	5	0	4+1	0	0	0

=== Goalscorers ===
Rank	No.	Pos	Nat	Name	Pro League	King Cup	Total
1	37	MF	(Spain)	Cristian Tello	11	1	12
2	11	MF	(Morocco)	Mourad Batna	8	2	10
3	21	FW	(Cape Verde)	Djaniny	8	1	9
4	10	MF	(Armenia)	Lucas Zelarayán	8	0	8
5	9	FW	(Saudi Arabia)	Firas Al-Buraikan	4	0	4
5	28	MF	(Algeria)	Sofiane Bendebka	4	0	4
5	49	FW	(Saudi Arabia)	Saad Al-Shurafa	4	0	4
8	17	DF	(Morocco)	Marwane Saâdane	3	0	3
8	83	DF	(Saudi Arabia)	Salem Al-Najdi	3	0	3
10	66	MF	(Saudi Arabia)	Abbas Al-Hassan	2	0	2
11	25	DF	(Saudi Arabia)	Tawfiq Buhimed	1	0	1
11	64	DF	(Belgium)	Jason Denayer	1	0	1
Own goal					0	0	0
Total					57	4	61

Last Updated: 27 May 2024

=== Assists ===
Rank	No.	Pos	Nat	Name	Pro League	King Cup	Total
1	11	MF	(Morocco)	Mourad Batna	8	2	10
2	10	MF	(Armenia)	Lucas Zelarayán	9	0	9
3	28	MF	(Algeria)	Sofiane Bendebka	6	0	6
4	7	MF	(Saudi Arabia)	Mukhtar Ali	3	0	3
4	37	MF	(Spain)	Cristian Tello	3	0	3
6	12	DF	(Saudi Arabia)	Saeed Baattiah	2	0	2
6	17	DF	(Morocco)	Marwane Saâdane	2	0	2
6	21	FW	(Cape Verde)	Djaniny	1	1	2
6	25	DF	(Saudi Arabia)	Tawfiq Buhimed	2	0	2
9	2	DF	(Saudi Arabia)	Ali Al-Zubaidi	1	0	1
9	5	DF	(Saudi Arabia)	Fahad Al-Harbi	1	0	1
9	9	FW	(Saudi Arabia)	Firas Al-Buraikan	1	0	1
9	14	MF	(Saudi Arabia)	Mohammed Al-Fuhaid	1	0	1
9	66	MF	(Saudi Arabia)	Abbas Al-Hassan	1	0	1
9	83	DF	(Saudi Arabia)	Salem Al-Najdi	1	0	1
Total					42	3	45

Last Updated: 27 May 2024

=== Clean sheets ===
Rank	No.	Pos	Nat	Name	Pro League	King Cup	Total
1	1	GK	(Sweden)	Jacob Rinne	1	0	1
1	26	GK	(Saudi Arabia)	Mustafa Malayekah	1	0	1
Total					2	0	2

Last Updated: 3 April 2024
