= 2025–26 Al-Fateh SC season =

Al-Fateh
2025–26 season
- President: Mansour Al-Afaliq
- Manager: José Gomes
- Stadium: Al-Fateh Club Stadium
- Pro League: Pre-season
- King Cup: Round of 32
- All statistics correct as of 1 July 2025.

The 2025–26 season is Al-Fateh's 17th consecutive season in the Pro League and their 68th year in existence. The club will participate in the Pro League and the King Cup.

The season covers the period from 1 July 2025 to 30 June 2026.

== Players ==
=== Squad information ===
As of 1 February 2025

Note: Flags indicate national team as defined under FIFA eligibility rules; some limited exceptions apply. Players may hold more than one non-FIFA nationality.

No.	Pos.	Nation	Player
1	GK	HUN	Péter Szappanos
4	DF	KSA	Ziyad Al-Jari
6	MF	KSA	Naif Masoud
7	MF	FRA	Amine Sbaï
9	FW	ARG	Matías Vargas
11	MF	MAR	Mourad Batna
13	DF	KSA	Hussain Qassem
14	MF	KSA	Mohammed Al-Fuhaid (captain)
15	DF	KSA	Saeed Baattiah
17	DF	MAR	Marwane Saâdane
20	FW	KSA	Abdullah Al-Mogren
21	FW	CPV	Djaniny
24	DF	KSA	Ammar Al-Daheem
28	MF	ALG	Sofiane Bendebka
29	FW	KSA	Ali Al-Masoud

No.	Pos.	Nation	Player
33	MF	COM	Zaydou Youssouf
40	GK	KSA	Sattam Al-Subaie
42	DF	KSA	Ahmed Al-Julaydan
44	DF	POR	Jorge Fernandes
48	GK	KSA	Muhannad Al-Yahya
49	FW	KSA	Saad Al-Shurafa
55	GK	KSA	Waleed Al-Enezi
63	DF	KSA	Montadhar Al-Shaqaq
75	MF	KSA	Mahdi Al-Aboud
80	MF	KSA	Faisal Al-Abdulwahed
82	DF	KSA	Hussain Al-Zarie
88	MF	KSA	Othman Al-Othman
94	MF	KSA	Abdullah Al-Enezi
99	FW	BRA	Matheus Machado

== Transfers and loans ==
=== Transfers in ===
Entry date	Position	No.	Player	From club	Fee	Ref.
30 June 2025	GK	1	(Hungary) Péter Szappanos	(Hungary) Paks	End of loan	
30 June 2025	GK	40	(Saudi Arabia) Sattam Al-Subaie	(Saudi Arabia) Mudhar	End of loan	
30 June 2025	MF	80	(Saudi Arabia) Faisal Al-Abdulwahed	(Saudi Arabia) Al-Batin	End of loan	
30 June 2025	FW	20	(Saudi Arabia) Abdullah Al-Mogren	(Saudi Arabia) Damac	End of loan	
26 August 2025	GK	97	(Saudi Arabia) Amin Bukhari	(Saudi Arabia) Al-Nassr	Free	
26 August 2025	DF	5	(Saudi Arabia) Faisal Darisi	(Saudi Arabia) Al-Jandal	Free	
26 August 2025	DF	87	(Saudi Arabia) Sattam Al-Tambakti	(Saudi Arabia) Al-Wehda	Undisclosed	
27 August 2025	FW	27	(Saudi Arabia) Fahad Al-Zubaidi	(Saudi Arabia) Al-Nassr	Undisclosed	
10 September 2025	GK	1	(Spain) Fernando Pacheco	(Spain) Espanyol	Free	
10 September 2025	FW	9	(Cameroon) Karl Toko Ekambi	(Saudi Arabia) Al-Ettifaq	Free	
14 September 2025	MF	23	(Cape Verde) Wesley Delgado	(Portugal) União de Coimbra	Free	
14 September 2025	FW	21	(Cape Verde) Jefferson Ramos	(Portugal) União de Coimbra	Free	

=== Loans in ===
Start date	End date	Position	No.	Player	From club	Fee	Ref.
27 August 2025	End of season	DF	50	(Saudi Arabia) Majed Qasheesh	(Saudi Arabia) Al-Nassr	None	

=== Transfers out ===
Exit date	Position	No.	Player	To club	Fee	Ref.
30 June 2025	GK	26	(Saudi Arabia) Nawaf Al-Aqidi	(Saudi Arabia) Al-Nassr	End of loan	
30 June 2025	MF	18	(Saudi Arabia) Suhayb Al-Zaid	(Saudi Arabia) Al-Hilal	End of loan	
21 July 2025	DF	82	(Saudi Arabia) Hussain Al-Zarie	(Saudi Arabia) Al-Diriyah	Free	
30 July 2025	GK	1	(Hungary) Péter Szappanos	(Hungary) Puskás Akadémia	Free	
12 August 2025	GK	55	(Saudi Arabia) Waleed Al-Enezi	(Saudi Arabia) Al-Najma	Free	
13 August 2025	DF	42	(Saudi Arabia) Ahmed Al-Julaydan	(Saudi Arabia) Al-Ittihad	$12,800,000	
19 August 2025	DF	24	(Saudi Arabia) Ammar Al-Dohaim	(Saudi Arabia) Al-Ula	Free	
9 September 2025	GK	48	(Saudi Arabia) Muhannad Al-Yahya	(Saudi Arabia) Al-Kholood	Free	
10 September 2025	MF	38	(Saudi Arabia) Loay Al-Johani	(Saudi Arabia) Al-Jeel	Free	
16 September 2025	GK	40	(Saudi Arabia) Sattam Al-Subaie	(Saudi Arabia) Mudhar	Free	
21 September 2025	MF	14	(Saudi Arabia) Mohammed Al-Fuhaid	(Saudi Arabia) Al-Faisaly	Free	
4 January 2026	FW	9	(Cameroon) Karl Toko Ekambi	(Qatar) Al-Arabi	Free	

=== Loans out ===
Start date	End date	Position	No.	Player	To club	Fee	Ref.
31 July 2025	End of season	FW	99	(Brazil) Matheus Machado	(Bulgaria) Ludogorets	None	
19 September 2025	End of season	FW	20	(Saudi Arabia) Abdullah Al-Mogren	(Saudi Arabia) Al-Faisaly	None	

== Pre-season and friendlies ==
6 August 2025 Friendly	Al-Fateh (Saudi Arabia)	1–0	(Spain) Europa	Girona, Spain
18:00 CEST	Vargas			Stadium: TorreMirona Sport Center

10 August 2025 Friendly	Al-Fateh (Saudi Arabia)	0–5	(Spain) Atlético Madrileño	Girona, Spain
10:30 CEST		Report	Janneh; Belaid; Cubo; Mota,	Stadium: TorreMirona Sport Center

16 August 2025 Friendly	Al-Fateh (Saudi Arabia)	4–2	(Andorra) Ordino	Girona, Spain
10:30 CEST		Report		Stadium: TorreMirona Sport Center

16 August 2025 Friendly	Al-Fateh (Saudi Arabia)	1–0	(Andorra) UE Santa Coloma	Girona, Spain
20:00 CEST		Report		Stadium: TorreMirona Sport Center

== Competitions ==
=== Overview ===
Competition	Record							
Competition	Pld	W	D	L	GF	GA	GD	Win %
Pro League	18	6	4	8	24	33	−9	33.33
King's Cup	3	2	0	1	5	5	+0	66.67
Total	21	8	4	9	29	38	−9	38.10

Updated to match played 29 January 2026
Source: Competitions

=== Pro League ===
==== League table ====
Pos	Team	Pld	W	D	L	GF	GA	GD	Pts
9	Al-Hazem	34	11	9	14	38	57	−19	42
10	Al-Fayha	34	10	8	16	41	54	−13	38
11	Al-Fateh	34	9	10	15	41	55	−14	37
12	Al-Khaleej	34	10	7	17	54	62	−8	37
13	Al-Shabab	34	8	11	15	44	57	−13	35

Source: SPL
Rules for classification: 1) Points; 2) Head-to-head points; 3) Head-to-head goal difference; 4) Total goal difference; 5) Total goals scored; 6) Fair-play points
(Note: Head-to-head record is used only after all the matches between the teams in question have been played).

==== Results summary ====
Overall								Home						Away					
Pld	W	D	L	GF	GA	GD	Pts	W	D	L	GF	GA	GD	W	D	L	GF	GA	GD
18	6	4	8	24	33	−9	22	4	1	4	16	18	−2	2	3	4	8	15	−7

Last updated: 29 January 2026.
Source: Saudi Pro League

==== Results by round ====
Round	1	2	3	4	5	6	7	8	9	11	12	13	14	15	16	17	18	19	20	21	22	23	10	24	25	26	27	28	29	30	31	32	33	34
Ground	H	A	A	H	A	H	A	H	A	H	A	H	A	H	A	H	A	H	H	A	H	A	H	H	A	H	A	A	H	A	H	A	H	A
Result	L	L	D	L	L	W	D	L	L	W	W	W	W	W	D	L	L	D																
Position	11	15	16	16	15	15	15	15	17	14	12	10	10	10	9	10	10	10																

Updated to match(es) played on 30 January 2026. Source: Saudi Pro League
A = Away; H = Home; W = Win; D = Draw; L = Loss

==== Matches ====
All times are local, AST (UTC+3).

Win Draw Loss Postponed

30 August 2025 1	Al-Fateh	1–2	Al-Fayha	Al-Hasa
18:55	Sbaï (red card) 21'; Vargas (yellow card) 37'; Youssouf 45+12'; Al-Tambakti (yellow card) 87'	Report	Jason 15'; Al-Rammah (yellow card) 18' (yellow-red card) 28'; Semedo 45+4'	Stadium: Al-Fateh Club Stadium; Attendance: 5,617; Referee: Abdullah Al-Harbi

12 September 2025 2	Al-Ittihad	4–2	Al-Fateh	Jeddah
21:00	Aouar 22', (yellow card) 42'; Pereira (yellow card) 26'; Bergwijn 35', 39'; Faqeehi (yellow card) 36'; Rajković (red card) 58'; Al-Absi (yellow card) 67'; Al-Shanqeeti 90+1'	Report	Vargas 33'; Batna (yellow card) 41' (yellow-red card) 45+1'; Bendebka 69' (pen.); Al Shurafa (yellow card) 73'; Baattiah (yellow card) 81'	Stadium: Alinma Stadium; Attendance: 40,359; Referee: Faisal Al-Blwi

20 September 2025 3	Al-Hazem	0–0	Al-Fateh	Ar Rass
18:40	Al-Shanqiti (yellow card) 16'; Al-Rashed (yellow card) 47'	Report	Qasheesh (yellow card) 48'; Youssouf (yellow card) 52'	Stadium: Al-Hazem Club Stadium; Attendance: 1,406; Referee: Ahmed Al-Rumaikhani

27 September 2025 4	Al-Fateh	0–1	Al-Qadsiah	Al-Hasa
21:00	Youssouf (yellow card) 34'; Pacheco (red card) 39'; Batna (yellow card) 61'; Saâdane (yellow card) 90+7'	Report	Al-Shahrani (yellow card) 29'; Bonsu Baah (yellow card) 44'; Quiñones 51'; Nández (yellow card) 58'; Retegui (yellow card) 61'; Al-Ammar (yellow card) 77'	Stadium: Al-Fateh Club Stadium; Attendance: 10,519; Referee: Florian Badstübner (Germany)

18 October 2025 5	Al-Nassr	5–1	Al-Fateh	Riyadh
21:00	Félix 13', 68', 79'; Mané (yellow card) 47'; Ronaldo 60', (yellow card) 62'; Coman 75'	Report	Toko Ekambi (yellow card) 39'; Bendebka 54'; Vargas (yellow card) 81'	Stadium: Al-Awwal Park; Attendance: 18,763; Referee: Abdullah Al-Shehri

24 October 2025 6	Al-Fateh	2–1	Al-Ettifaq	Al-Hasa
17:45	Saâdane (yellow card) 25'; Al-Zubaidi 45+4'; Fernandes 64'; Youssouf (yellow card) 86'; Qasheesh (yellow card) 90+4'	Report	Al-Ghannam (yellow card) 16'; Duda (yellow card) 20'; Dembélé 49' (pen.); Dahal (yellow card) 88'	Stadium: Maydan Tamweel Aloula; Attendance: 9,345; Referee: Khalid Al-Turais

30 October 2025 7	Damac	1–1	Al-Fateh	Abha
18:15	Vada (yellow card) 3'; Al-Anazi (yellow card) 19'; Saâdane 63' (o.g.)	Report	Saâdane (yellow card) 45+1'; Bendebka 47'	Stadium: Prince Sultan bin Abdulaziz Sports City Stadium; Attendance: 271; Referee: Abdullah Al-Harbi

7 November 2025 8	Al-Fateh	2–5	Al-Taawoun	Al-Hasa
17:35	Saâdane (yellow card) 8'; Fernandes (yellow card) 13'; Al-Zubaidi (yellow card) 69'; Vargas 77'; Batna 90+2' (pen.); Baattiah (yellow card) 90+5'	Report	Martínez 14', 33', 62'; Mahzari (yellow card) 17'; Hugo (yellow card) 38'; Zambrano 41'; Al-Kuwaykibi 72'; Al-Shoeil (yellow card) 90+4'	Stadium: Maydan Tamweel Aloula; Attendance: 6,357; Referee: Abdullah Zarban

22 November 2025 9	Al-Hilal	2–1	Al-Fateh	Riyadh
20:30	Núñez 26'; Milinković-Savić (yellow card) 68'; N. Al-Dawsari (red card) 79'; Neves 88' (pen.); Koulibaly (yellow card) 90+8'	Report	Batna 9'; Al-Jari (yellow card) 31'; Al-Tambakti (yellow card) 90+3'	Stadium: Kingdom Arena; Attendance: 19,200; Referee: Horațiu Feșnic (Romania)

26 December 2025 11	Al-Fateh	2–1	Al-Ahli	Al-Hasa
16:05	Vargas 43', 47'; Delgado (yellow card) 69'	Report	Atangana 22'; Majrashi (yellow card) 36'; Millot (yellow card) 49'; Aboulshamat (yellow card) 85'	Stadium: Maydan Tamweel Aloula; Attendance: 10,982; Referee: Khalid Al-Turais

29 December 2025 12	Al-Khaleej	0–1	Al-Fateh	Dammam
17:35	Schenkeveld (yellow card) 45+3'; Al-Khabrani (yellow card) 80'	Report	Baattiah (yellow card) 29'; Vargas 41'; Fernandes (yellow card) 68'; Al-Sahihi (yellow card) 85'; Al-Othman (yellow card) 90+3'	Stadium: Prince Mohamed bin Fahd Stadium; Attendance: 3,294; Referee: Abdullah Al-Kharbosh

3 January 2026 13	Al-Fateh	2–0	Al-Shabab	Al-Hasa
16:10	Bendebka 11'; Batna (yellow card) 45+1'; Saâdane (yellow card) 45+2'; Baattiah (yellow card) 57'; Delgado (yellow card) 65'; Al-Zubaidi 90+5'	Report	H. Al-Sibyani (yellow card) 19'; F. Al-Subiani (yellow card) 27' (yellow-red card) 47'; Carrasco (yellow card) 56'; Makki (red card) 62'	Stadium: Maydan Tamweel Aloula; Attendance: 6,017; Referee: Ahmed Al-Rumaikhani

10 January 2026 14	Neom	0–1	Al-Fateh	Tabuk
17:00	Benrahma (yellow card) 71'	Report	Al-Suwailem (yellow card) 5'; Masoud 36'; Delgado (yellow card) 56'; Batna (yellow card) 81'; Al-Fawaz (yellow card) 90+2'	Stadium: King Khalid Sport City Stadium; Attendance: 1,579; Referee: Abdullah Al-Owaydan

13 January 2026 15	Al-Fateh	3–1	Al-Riyadh	Al-Hasa
20:30	Delgado 11', 50', (yellow card) 52'; Al-Jari (yellow card) 41'; Batna 62'; Al-Hamad (yellow card) 74'	Report	Bayesh (yellow card) 22'; Tozé 80'; Al-Khaibari (yellow card) 90+1'	Stadium: Maydan Tamweel Aloula; Attendance: 9,104; Referee: Abdullah Al-Harbi

16 January 2026 16	Al-Najma	1–1	Al-Fateh	Buraidah
16:40	Al-Haleel (yellow card) 21'; Jasim 75'	Report	Al-Anazi 12'	Stadium: King Abdullah Sports City; Attendance: 1,684; Referee: Ali Al-Qahtani

20 January 2026 17	Al-Fateh	2–5	Al-Kholood	Al-Hasa
20:30	Youssouf 45+3'; Buckley 57' (o.g.); Baattiah (yellow card) 60'; Al-Jari (yellow card) 74'	Report	Solan (yellow card) 9'; Enrique 12', 81'; Sawaan 19'; Gyömbér (yellow card) 43'; Bahebri 55'; Al-Dawsari 71'; Al-Safri (yellow card) 90+2'	Stadium: Maydan Tamweel Aloula; Attendance: 7,118; Referee: Khaled Al-Ahmari

25 January 2026 18	Al-Fayha	2–0	Al-Fateh	Al Majma'ah
20:30	Kaabi (yellow card) 38'; Villanueva (yellow card) 42'; Dahal 79'; Sakala 88'	Report	Al-Zubaidi (yellow card) 38'; Al-Anazi (yellow card) 67'	Stadium: Al-Majma'ah Sports City Stadium; Attendance: 424; Referee: Mohammed Abu Shaqarah

29 January 2026 19	Al-Fateh	2–2	Al-Ittihad	Al-Hasa
18:00	Vargas (yellow card) 29', (goal) 90+9'; Batna 74' (pen.); Saâdane (yellow card) 90+11'	Report	Al-Shehri 25', 84' (pen.)	Stadium: Maydan Tamweel Aloula; Attendance: 10,966; Referee: Majed Al-Shamrani

20 December 2025 10	Al-Fateh	v	Al-Okhdood	Al-Hasa
17:30				Stadium: Maydan Tamweel Aloula

=== King's Cup ===
All times are local, AST (UTC+3).

24 September 2025 Round of 32	Al-Jabalain	1–2	Al-Fateh	Ha'il
18:45	Touré 30'; Queirós (yellow card) 59'; Al-Torais (yellow card) 90'	Report	Vargas 43', (red card) 90+7'; Youssouf (yellow card) 49'; Toko Ekambi 82'; Batna (yellow card) 90+2'	Stadium: Prince Abdulaziz bin Musa'ed Sports City; Referee: Ali Al-Qahtani

27 October 2025 Round of 16	Al-Fateh	2–0	Al-Riyadh	Al-Hasa
17:35	Bendebka (yellow card) 50'; Batna 63'; Al-Zubaidi 74'; Al-Sahihi (yellow card) 90+8'	Report	Okou (yellow card) 47'; González (yellow card) 52'; Barbet (yellow card) 66'; Sylla (yellow card) 71'	Stadium: Maydan Tamweel Aloula; Attendance: 3,134; Referee: Abdullah Al-Kharboush

29 November 2025 Quarter-finals	Al-Hilal	4–1	Al-Fateh	Riyadh
17:40	Malcom 21'; Neves 23', (yellow card) 26'; Al-Tombakti 35'; Leonardo 49'	Report	Vargas 90+2'	Stadium: Kingdom Arena; Attendance: 19,100; Referee: Donatas Rumšas (Lithuania)

== Statistics ==
=== Appearances ===
Last updated on 29 January 2026.

No.	Pos	Nat	Player	Total		Pro League		King Cup	
No.	Pos	Nat	Player	Apps	Goals	Apps	Goals	Apps	Goals
Goalkeepers
1	GK	(Spain) ESP	Fernando Pacheco	19	0	16	0	3	0
31	GK	(Saudi Arabia) KSA	Habib Al-Wotayan	0	0	0	0	0	0
97	GK	(Saudi Arabia) KSA	Amin Bukhari	3	0	2+1	0	0	0
Defenders
4	DF	(Saudi Arabia) KSA	Ziyad Al-Jari	11	0	9+1	0	1	0
5	DF	(Saudi Arabia) KSA	Faisal Darisi	4	0	4	0	0	0
12	DF	(Saudi Arabia) KSA	Hussain Qassem	3	0	0+3	0	0	0
15	DF	(Saudi Arabia) KSA	Saeed Baattiah	20	0	16+1	0	3	0
17	DF	(Morocco) MAR	Marwane Saâdane	18	0	15	0	3	0
37	DF	(Saudi Arabia) KSA	Mohammed Al-Sarnoukh	6	0	0+6	0	0	0
44	DF	(Portugal) POR	Jorge Fernandes	19	1	15+1	1	3	0
50	DF	(Saudi Arabia) KSA	Majed Qasheesh	7	0	5	0	2	0
55	DF	(Saudi Arabia) KSA	Fawaz Al-Hamad	4	0	3+1	0	0	0
63	DF	(Saudi Arabia) KSA	Montadhar Al-Shaqaq	0	0	0	0	0	0
78	DF	(Saudi Arabia) KSA	Abdulaziz Al-Suwailem	7	0	4+3	0	0	0
87	DF	(Saudi Arabia) KSA	Sattam Al-Tambakti	8	0	1+6	0	0+1	0
Midfielders
6	MF	(Saudi Arabia) KSA	Naif Masoud	17	1	12+3	1	2	0
11	MF	(Morocco) MAR	Mourad Batna	20	5	16+1	4	2+1	1
23	MF	(Cape Verde) CPV	Wesley Delgado	12	2	9+1	2	0+2	0
24	MF	(Saudi Arabia) KSA	Mahdi Al-Aboud	4	0	0+4	0	0	0
25	MF	(Saudi Arabia) KSA	Mohammed Al-Sahihi	6	0	0+5	0	0+1	0
28	MF	(Algeria) ALG	Sofiane Bendebka	15	4	10+2	4	3	0
33	MF	(Comoros) COM	Zaydou Youssouf	19	2	15+1	2	3	0
70	MF	(Egypt) EGY	Mohamed Refat	0	0	0	0	0	0
80	MF	(Saudi Arabia) KSA	Faisal Al-Abdulwahed	2	0	0+2	0	0	0
88	MF	(Saudi Arabia) KSA	Othman Al-Othman	8	0	3+3	0	2	0
94	MF	(Saudi Arabia) KSA	Abdullah Al-Anazi	12	1	9+2	1	1	0
98	MF	(Saudi Arabia) KSA	Abdulaziz Al-Fawaz	13	0	4+7	0	0+2	0
Forwards
10	FW	(Argentina) ARG	Matías Vargas	19	8	17	6	2	2
21	FW	(Cape Verde) CPV	Jefferson Ramos	2	0	0+1	0	0+1	0
27	FW	(Saudi Arabia) KSA	Fahad Al-Zubaidi	20	3	5+13	2	1+1	1
29	FW	(Saudi Arabia) KSA	Ali Al-Masoud	6	0	2+4	0	0	0
49	FW	(Saudi Arabia) KSA	Saad Al Shurafa	13	0	0+10	0	0+3	0
Player who made an appearance this season but left the club
7	MF	(France) FRA	Amine Sbaï	1	0	1	0	0	0
9	FW	(Cameroon) CMR	Karl Toko Ekambi	10	1	5+2	0	2+1	1

=== Goalscorers ===
Rank	No.	Pos	Nat	Name	Pro League	King Cup	Total
1	10	FW	(Argentina)	Matías Vargas	6	2	8
2	11	MF	(Morocco)	Mourad Batna	4	1	5
3	28	MF	(Algeria)	Sofiane Bendebka	4	0	4
4	27	FW	(Saudi Arabia)	Fahad Al-Zubaidi	2	1	3
5	23	MF	(Cape Verde)	Wesley Delgado	2	0	2
5	33	MF	(Comoros)	Zaydou Youssouf	2	0	2
7	6	MF	(Saudi Arabia)	Naif Masoud	1	0	1
7	9	FW	(Cameroon)	Karl Toko Ekambi	0	1	1
7	44	DF	(Portugal)	Jorge Fernandes	1	0	1
7	94	MF	(Saudi Arabia)	Abdullah Al-Anazi	1	0	1
Own goal					1	0	1
Total					24	5	29

Last Updated: 29 January 2026

=== Assists ===
Rank	No.	Pos	Nat	Name	Pro League	King Cup	Total
1	11	MF	(Morocco)	Mourad Batna	7	0	7
2	10	FW	(Argentina)	Matías Vargas	1	1	2
2	27	FW	(Saudi Arabia)	Fahad Al-Zubaidi	2	0	2
4	15	DF	(Saudi Arabia)	Saeed Baattiah	0	1	1
4	17	DF	(Morocco)	Marwane Saâdane	1	0	1
4	28	MF	(Algeria)	Sofiane Bendebka	1	0	1
4	33	MF	(Comoros)	Zaydou Youssouf	1	0	1
4	49	FW	(Saudi Arabia)	Saad Al Shurafa	0	1	1
4	94	MF	(Saudi Arabia)	Abdullah Al-Anazi	1	0	1
Total					14	3	17

Last Updated: 29 January 2026

=== Clean sheets ===
Rank	No.	Pos	Nat	Name	Pro League	King Cup	Total
1	1	GK	(Spain)	Fernando Pacheco	4	1	5
Total					4	1	5

Last Updated: 10 January 2026
