= 2023–24 Saudi Pro League =

Saudi Pro League
- Season: 2023–24
- Dates: 11 August 2023 – 27 May 2024
- Champions: Al-Hilal (19th title)
- Relegated: Abha; Al-Tai; Al-Hazem
- AFC Champions League Elite: Al-Hilal; Al-Nassr; Al-Ahli
- AFC Champions League Two: Al-Taawoun
- AGCFF Gulf Club Champions League: Al-Ettifaq
- Matches: 306
- Goals: 909 (2.97 per match)
- Top goalscorer: Cristiano Ronaldo (35 goals)
- Best goalkeeper: Yassine Bounou
- Biggest home win: Al-Hilal 7–0 Abha (21 December 2023)
- Biggest away win: Al-Hazem 0–9 Al-Hilal (25 November 2023)
- Highest scoring: Al-Hazem 0–9 Al-Hilal (25 November 2023)
- Longest winning run: Al-Hilal (24 matches)
- Longest unbeaten run: Al-Hilal (34 matches)
- Longest winless run: Al-Hazem (12 matches)
- Longest losing run: Al-Fayha; Al-Riyadh (5 matches)
- Highest attendance: 59,600; Al-Hilal 1–1 Al-Fayha (19 August 2023)
- Lowest attendance: 117; Al-Hazem 2–1 Abha (27 May 2024)
- Total attendance: 2,496,510
- Average attendance: 8,159

The 2023–24 Saudi Pro League (known as the Roshn Saudi League for sponsorship reasons) was the 49th edition of the top-tier Saudi football league, established in 1974, and the 16th edition since it was rebranded as the Saudi Pro League in 2008, Fixtures for the 2023–24 season were announced on 15 July 2023.

Al-Ittihad were the defending champions after winning their 9th title last season. Al-Ahli, Al-Hazem, Al-Okhdood, and Al-Riyadh join as the four promoted clubs. They replaced Al-Adalah and Al-Batin who were relegated to the 2023–24 Yelo League. The league now had 18 teams for the first time as opposed to the 16 teams of prior seasons.

On 11 May, Al-Hilal secured their record-extending nineteenth league title, with three games to spare, following a 4–1 away win against Al-Hazem, and then they completed the unbeaten season 16 days later. Coincidentally, Al-Hazem were the first team to be relegated following that 4–1 home defeat. In the final matchday, both Abha and Al-Tai were relegated following defeats to Al-Hazem and Al-Okhdood respectively.

== Overview ==
=== Changes ===
On 14 April 2022, the Saudi FF announced that the number of teams would increase to 18 starting from the 2023–24 season. Therefore, only two teams would be relegated from the 2022–23 Saudi Pro League instead of the usual three, and four teams would be promoted from the 2022–23 Saudi First Division League.

In June 2023, the Public Investment Fund acquired a 75% stake in Al-Ahli, Al-Hilal, Al-Ittihad and Al-Nassr.

=== Record ===
This season had the highest attendance in the SPL history, with 2,496,510 fans attending the matches.

== Teams ==
Locations of teams in the 2023–24 Saudi Pro League

18 teams competed in the league – the top 14 teams from the previous season and the 4 teams promoted from the FD League.

=== Teams who were promoted to the Pro League ===
On 5 May 2023, Al-Ahli became the first team to be promoted, following Al-Faisaly's 2–2 draw with Najran. They were crowned champions following a 1–0 win against Al-Qadsiah on 23 May 2023. Al-Ahli played in the top flight of Saudi football after a season's absence and played in their 47th season in the top flight.

The second club to be promoted was Al-Okhdood, who were promoted after Al-Faisaly's 2–2 draw with Jeddah on 15 May 2023. Al-Okhdood played in the top flight of Saudi football for the first time in history. Al-Okhdood became the 37th side to participate in the Saudi Pro League since its inception.

The third club to be promoted was Al-Riyadh, who were promoted following a 1–0 home win against Al-Orobah on 16 May 2023. Al-Riyadh returned to the top flight for the first time since getting relegated in the 2004–05 season. Al-Riyadh played in their 24th season in the top flight.

The fourth and final club to be promoted was Al-Hazem, who were promoted following a 3–2 win against Al-Sahel on 17 May 2023. Al-Hazem played in the top flight of Saudi football after a season's absence and played in their 10th season in the top flight.

=== Teams who were relegated to the FD League ===
Al-Batin were the first club to be relegated, following a 1–0 defeat away to Al-Ittihad on 23 May 2023. Al-Batin were relegated after three years in the top flight.

Al-Adalah were the second and final club to be relegated, following a 2–0 home defeat to Al-Ettifaq on the final matchday. Al-Adalah were relegated after just one year in the top flight.

=== Stadiums ===
Note: Table lists in alphabetical order.

Team	Location	Stadium	Capacity
Abha	Abha	Prince Sultan bin Abdul Aziz Stadium	20,000
Al-Ahli	Jeddah	King Abdullah Sports City	62,345
Al-Ettifaq	Dammam	Al-Ettifaq Club Stadium	15,000
Al-Fateh	Al-Mubarraz	Al-Fateh Stadium	10,000
Al-Fayha	Al Majma'ah	Al Majma'ah Sports City	7,000
Al-Hazem	Ar Rass	Al-Hazem Club Stadium	8,000
Al-Hilal	Riyadh	Kingdom Arena	30,000
Al-Ittihad	Jeddah	King Abdullah Sports City	62,345
Al-Khaleej	Saihat	Prince Mohamed bin Fahd Stadium (Dammam)	35,000
Al-Nassr	Riyadh	Al-Awwal Park	25,000
Al-Okhdood	Najran	Prince Hathloul bin Abdul Aziz Sports City	12,000
Al-Raed	Buraidah	King Abdullah Sport City Stadium	25,000
Al-Riyadh	Riyadh	Prince Turki bin Abdul Aziz Stadium	15,000
Al-Shabab	Riyadh	Al-Shabab Club Stadium	15,000
Al-Taawoun	Buraidah	King Abdullah Sport City Stadium; Al-Taawoun Club Stadium	25,000; 5,961
Al-Tai	Ha'il	Prince Abdul Aziz bin Musa'ed Stadium	12,000
Al-Wehda	Mecca	King Abdul Aziz Stadium	38,000
Damac	Khamis Mushait	Prince Sultan bin Abdul Aziz Stadium (Abha); Damac Club Stadium	20,000; 5,000

=== Personnel and kits ===
Team	Manager	Captain	Kit manufacturer	Shirt sponsor
Abha	(South Africa) Pitso Mosimane	(Tunisia) Saad Bguir	Offside	Yelo, Tameeni, Mezaj, Al Tazaj^{1}, Hayat National Hospital^{1}, Florina^{1}
Al-Ahli	(Germany) Matthias Jaissle	(Brazil) Roberto Firmino	Adidas	Red Sea Global, Neoleap, SIRC, Urpay^{1}, Kayanee^{1}, Qaid^{2}, Saudi German Hospital^{2}, Vveyon^{3}
Al-Ettifaq	(England) Steven Gerrard	(Netherlands) Georginio Wijnaldum	Tempo Sport	Hongqi, Kammelna, Aldyar Alarabiya, Tameeni, Procare Hospital^{1}, Qaid^{2}, Direct^{2}
Al-Fateh	(Croatia) Slaven Bilić	(Saudi Arabia) Mohammed Al-Fuhaid	100°	Al-Jabr Finance, Fuschia, Tameeni, Al Kifah Holding^{1}, Malakan^{1}, Direct^{2}, Skkah^{2}
Al-Fayha	(Serbia) Vuk Rašović	(Saudi Arabia) Sami Al-Khaibari	Skillano	Afaq Al Arabya, Tameeni, Tasooma, Al Tazaj^{1}, Aromatic^{1}, Mashar Water^{1}, Soum^{2}, Reefi^{2}, Summer Holidays^{3}
Al-Hazem	(Saudi Arabia) Saleh Al-Mohammadi	(Saudi Arabia) Abdulrahman Al-Dakheel	RightAway Sport	Tameeni, Reefi, Alnadeg^{1}, Qaid^{2}
Al-Hilal	(Portugal) Jorge Jesus	(Saudi Arabia) Salman Al-Faraj	Puma	Savvy, Jahez, Riyad Bank^{1}, Seven^{1}, Floward^{2}, Sanabil Investments^{2}
Al-Ittihad	(Argentina) Marcelo Gallardo	(Egypt) Ahmed Hegazy	Nike	Roshn, SRJ Sports Investments, Nua^{1}
Al-Khaleej	(Portugal) Pedro Emanuel	(Portugal) Fábio Martins	Laser	Yelo, Tameeni, Mezaj, Shemagh Al Bassam^{1}, Locate^{1}, Reefi^{1}, Qaid^{2}
Al-Nassr	(Portugal) Luís Castro	(Portugal) Cristiano Ronaldo	Nike	KAFD, AROYA Cruises, Noug^{2}
Al-Okhdood	(Algeria) Noureddine Zekri	(Saudi Arabia) Hussain Al-Zabdani	Skillano	Najran Cement, Tameeni, Florina^{1}, Abdal^{1}, Qaid^{2}
Al-Raed	(Croatia) Igor Jovićević	(Morocco) Mohamed Fouzair	Challenge	Alajlan Riviera, Tameeni, Dinar, Al Tazaj^{1}, Al Qassim National Hospital^{1}, Peanut Butter & Co.^{2}, Qaid^{2}
Al-Riyadh	(Brazil) Odair Hellmann	(Zimbabwe) Knowledge Musona	Zeus	Yelo, Direct, Al Saif, Shumou Investment^{1}, AlDakheel Oud^{1}, Wataniya Finance^{1}, Mothhelah^{2}, Wav Water^{3}
Al-Shabab	(Portugal) Vítor Pereira	(Morocco) Romain Saïss	Offside	Diaar, Tameeni, Ego^{1}, Almanea^{1}, NOB Agency^{2}, Wosul^{3}
Al-Taawoun	(Brazil) Péricles Chamusca	(Netherlands) Aschraf El Mahdioui	Macron	GREE, Aldyar Alarabiya, Mothhelah, Tameeni, Khadeer Tea^{1}, Alnadeg^{1}, Hayat National Hospital^{1}, Suom^{2}, Abdal^{2}, Dr Nutrition^{3}
Al-Tai	(Uruguay) Leonardo Ramos	(Guinea-Bissau) Alfa Semedo	Offside	Mashar, Abar, Tameeni, AlAhli Medical^{1}, 25 E-Sports^{1}, Qaid^{2}, Sakura Cafe^{3}
Al-Wehda	(Greece) Georgios Donis	(Saudi Arabia) Waleed Bakshween	Offside	Yelo, Tameeni, NTAM^{1}, Qaid^{2}, Makkah Medical Center^{2}
Damac	(Romania) Cosmin Contra	(Algeria) Farouk Chafaï	Skillano	Basic Electronics, Tameeni, Reefi, Hayat National Hospital^{1}, Bin Thaliba^{1}, AlBayt AlRomancy^{1}, Qaid^{2}

- ^{1} On the back of the strip.
- ^{2} On the right sleeve of the strip.
- ^{3} On the shorts.

=== Managerial changes ===
Team	Outgoing manager	Manner of departure	Date of vacancy	Position in table	Incoming manager	Date of appointment
Al-Ettifaq	(Spain) Antonio Cazorla (caretaker)	End of caretaker period	1 June 2023	Pre-season	(England) Steven Gerrard	3 July 2023
Al-Hilal	(Argentina) Emiliano Díaz (caretaker)	End of caretaker period	1 June 2023	Pre-season	(Portugal) Jorge Jesus	1 July 2023
Al-Nassr	(Croatia) Dinko Jeličić (caretaker)	End of caretaker period	1 June 2023	Pre-season	(Portugal) Luís Castro	6 July 2023
Al-Tai	(Portugal) José Pedro Barreto (caretaker)	End of caretaker period	1 June 2023	Pre-season	(Croatia) Krešimir Režić	1 June 2023
Abha	(Netherlands) Roel Coumans	End of contract	1 June 2023	Pre-season	(Poland) Czesław Michniewicz	12 June 2023
Al-Ahli	(South Africa) Pitso Mosimane	End of contract	1 June 2023	Pre-season	(Germany) Matthias Jaissle	28 July 2023
Al-Fateh	(Greece) Georgios Donis	End of contract	1 June 2023	Pre-season	(Croatia) Slaven Bilić	8 July 2023
Al-Raed	(Romania) Marius Șumudică	End of contract	1 June 2023	Pre-season	(Croatia) Igor Jovićević	9 July 2023
Al-Riyadh	(Croatia) Damir Burić	End of contract	1 June 2023	Pre-season	(Belgium) Yannick Ferrera	6 June 2023
Al-Shabab	(Spain) Vicente Moreno	End of contract	1 June 2023	Pre-season	(Netherlands) Marcel Keizer	27 July 2023
Al-Wehda	(Chile) José Luis Sierra	End of contract	1 June 2023	Pre-season	(Greece) Georgios Donis	11 July 2023
Al-Shabab	(Netherlands) Marcel Keizer	Mutual consent	6 September 2023	17th	(Argentina) Juan Brown (caretaker)	6 September 2023
Al-Riyadh	(Belgium) Yannick Ferrera	Sacked	20 September 2023	16th	(Saudi Arabia) Bandar Al-Kubaishan (caretaker)	20 September 2023
Al-Tai	(Croatia) Krešimir Režić	Sacked	25 September 2023	12th	(Romania) Laurențiu Reghecampf	25 September 2023
Abha	(Poland) Czesław Michniewicz	Sacked	1 October 2023	16th	(Romania) George Timis (caretaker)	1 October 2023
Al-Riyadh	(Saudi Arabia) Bandar Al-Kubaishan (caretaker)	End of caretaker period	8 October 2023	13th	(Brazil) Odair Hellmann	8 October 2023
Abha	(Romania) George Timis (caretaker)	End of caretaker period	9 October 2023	15th	(Tunisia) Yousef Al Mannai	9 October 2023
Al-Shabab	(Argentina) Juan Brown (caretaker)	End of caretaker period	18 October 2023	12th	(Croatia) Igor Bišćan	18 October 2023
Al-Hazem	(Portugal) Filipe Gouveia	Mutual consent	20 October 2023	18th	(Uruguay) José Daniel Carreño	20 October 2023
Al-Ittihad	(Portugal) Nuno Espírito Santo	Sacked	8 November 2023	6th	(Saudi Arabia) Hassan Khalifa (caretaker)	8 November 2023
Al-Okhdood	(Portugal) Jorge Mendonca	Sacked	10 November 2023	16th	(Slovakia) Martin Ševela	10 November 2023
Al-Ittihad	(Saudi Arabia) Hassan Khalifa (caretaker)	End of caretaker period	18 November 2023	5th	(Argentina) Marcelo Gallardo	18 November 2023
Abha	(Tunisia) Yousef Al Mannai	Sacked	17 December 2023	16th	(Romania) George Timis (caretaker)	17 December 2023
Al-Shabab	(Croatia) Igor Bišćan	Sacked	27 December 2023	13th	(Portugal) Vítor Pereira	5 February 2024
Abha	(Romania) George Timis (caretaker)	End of caretaker period	26 January 2024	17th	(South Africa) Pitso Mosimane	26 January 2024
Al-Tai	(Romania) Laurențiu Reghecampf	Sacked	4 April 2024	16th	(Romania) Cristinel Țermure (caretaker)	4 April 2024
Al-Tai	(Romania) Cristinel Țermure (caretaker)	End of caretaker period	15 April 2024	17th	(Uruguay) Leonardo Ramos	15 April 2024
Al-Okhdood	(Slovakia) Martin Ševela	Mutual consent	17 April 2024	16th	(Algeria) Noureddine Zekri	17 April 2024
Al-Hazem	(Uruguay) José Daniel Carreño	Mutual consent	19 April 2024	18th	(Saudi Arabia) Saleh Al-Mohammadi	19 April 2024

== Foreign players ==
Clubs can register a total of eight foreign players over the course of the season. Before the summer transfer window closed, there is no foreigners limit. The definitive list of the eight foreign players will be available at the end of the summer transfer window.

- Players name in **bold** indicates the player is registered during the mid-season transfer window.
- Players in italics were out of the squad or left the club within the season, after the pre-season transfer window, or in the mid-season transfer window, and at least had one appearance.
- Players from other countries who were born in Saudi Arabia are counted as homegrown/local players.

Club	Player 1	Player 2	Player 3	Player 4	Player 5	Player 6	Player 7	Player 8	Players born in Saudi Arabia	Unregistered players	Former players
Abha	(Argentina) Fabián Noguera	(Democratic Republic of the Congo) **Marcel Tisserand**	(Guinea) François Kamano	(Montenegro) **Luka Đorđević**	(Poland) Grzegorz Krychowiak	(Romania) Ciprian Tătărușanu	(Serbia) Uroš Matić	(Tunisia) Saad Bguir	(Eritrea) Ahmed Abdu Jaber		(Cameroon) Karl Toko Ekambi (Cameroon) Devis Epassy (Iraq) Saad Natiq
Al-Ahli	(Algeria) Riyad Mahrez	(Brazil) Roberto Firmino	(Brazil) Roger Ibañez	(France) Allan Saint-Maximin	(Ivory Coast) Franck Kessié	(Senegal) Édouard Mendy	(Spain) Gabri Veiga	(Turkey) Merih Demiral		(The Gambia) Modou Barrow (North Macedonia) Ezgjan Alioski	(Algeria) Ryad Boudebouz
Al-Ettifaq	(Brazil) Paulo Victor	(Cameroon) **Karl Toko Ekambi**	(France) Moussa Dembélé	(Ivory Coast) **Seko Fofana**	(Jamaica) Demarai Gray	(Netherlands) Georginio Wijnaldum	(Scotland) Jack Hendry	(Spain) **Álvaro Medrán**		(Sweden) Robin Quaison	(Brazil) Vitinho (Democratic Republic of the Congo) Marcel Tisserand (England) Jordan Henderson
Al-Fateh	(Algeria) Sofiane Bendebka	(Armenia) Lucas Zelarayán	(Belgium) Jason Denayer	(Cape Verde) Djaniny	(Morocco) Mourad Batna	(Morocco) Marwane Saâdane	(Spain) Cristian Tello	(Sweden) Jacob Rinne	(Australia) Jordan Harrison		(Brazil) Petros
Al-Fayha	(Bosnia and Herzegovina) Gojko Cimirot	(Brazil) Ricardo Ryller	(Ivory Coast) Ghislain Konan	(Morocco) Abdelhamid Sabiri	(Nigeria) Anthony Nwakaeme	(Nigeria) Henry Onyekuru	(Serbia) Vladimir Stojković	(Zambia) Fashion Sakala			(Serbia) Milan Pavkov (Spain) Víctor Ruiz
Al-Hazem	(Brazil) Paulo Ricardo	(Brazil) Bruno Viana	(Brazil) Vina	(Comoros) Faïz Selemani	(The Gambia) Muhammed Badamosi	(Portugal) Tozé	(Tunisia) Aymen Dahmen	(Venezuela) **Júnior Moreno**			(Ivory Coast) Ben Hassan Traoré
Al-Hilal	(Brazil) **Renan Lodi**	(Brazil) Malcom	(Brazil) Michael	(Morocco) Yassine Bounou	(Portugal) Rúben Neves	(Senegal) Kalidou Koulibaly	(Serbia) Sergej Milinković-Savić	(Serbia) Aleksandar Mitrović		(Brazil) Neymar	
Al-Ittihad	(Brazil) Fabinho	(Brazil) Romarinho	(Egypt) Ahmed Hegazi	(France) Karim Benzema	(France) N'Golo Kanté	(Italy) Luiz Felipe	(Morocco) Abderrazak Hamdallah	(Portugal) Jota	(Yemen) Salem Ayyash	(Brazil) Marcelo Grohe	(Brazil) Igor Coronado
Al-Khaleej	(Argentina) Lisandro López	(Bosnia and Herzegovina) Ibrahim Šehić	(Egypt) Mohamed Sherif	(Portugal) Fábio Martins	(Portugal) Pedro Rebocho	(Portugal) Ivo Rodrigues	(South Korea) Jung Woo-young	(Togo) Khaled Narey		(England) Mo Adams	
Al-Nassr	(Brazil) Talisca	(Brazil) Alex Telles	(Colombia) David Ospina	(Croatia) Marcelo Brozović	(Portugal) Otávio	(Portugal) Cristiano Ronaldo	(Senegal) Sadio Mané	(Spain) Aymeric Laporte		(Australia) **Aziz Behich**	(Ivory Coast) Seko Fofana
Al-Okhdood	(Brazil) Paulo Vítor	(Cameroon) Léandre Tawamba	(Colombia) Sebastián Pedroza	(Georgia (country)) Solomon Kvirkvelia	(Nigeria) Saviour Godwin	(Romania) Andrei Burcă	(Romania) Florin Tănase	(Spain) Álex Collado	(Egypt) Ahmed Mostafa		
Al-Raed	(Algeria) Amir Sayoud	(Cameroon) Oumar Gonzalez	(Cape Verde) Júlio Tavares	(Morocco) Karim El Berkaoui	(Morocco) Mohamed Fouzair	(Norway) Mathias Normann	(Portugal) André Moreira	(Senegal) Mamadou Loum	(Syria) Bassam Hamoud		
Al-Riyadh	(Belgium) Dino Arslanagić	(Gabon) Didier Ndong	(Jamaica) Andre Gray	(Mali) Birama Touré	(Romania) Alin Toșca	(Uruguay) Martín Campaña	(Zimbabwe) Knowledge Musona				(Spain) Juanmi
Al-Shabab	(Belgium) Yannick Carrasco	(Brazil) Carlos Júnior	(Brazil) Iago Santos	(Brazil) **Vitinho**	(Colombia) Gustavo Cuéllar	(Croatia) **Ivan Rakitić**	(Morocco) Romain Saïss	(Senegal) Habib Diallo		(South Korea) Kim Seung-gyu	(Argentina) Éver Banega
Al-Taawoun	(Argentina) **Cristian Guanca**	(Brazil) Flávio	(Brazil) Andrei Girotto	(Brazil) Mailson	(Brazil) Mateus	(Brazil) João Pedro	(The Gambia) Musa Barrow	(Netherlands) Aschraf El Mahdioui	(Tunisia) Rayan Fourgi		(Spain) Álvaro Medrán
Al-Tai	(Brazil) Victor Braga	(Chile) Enzo Roco	(Croatia) Marko Dugandžić	(Germany) Robert Bauer	(Ghana) Bernard Mensah	(Guinea-Bissau) Alfa Semedo	(Romania) Andrei Cordea	(Suriname) Virgil Misidjan			
Al-Wehda	(Australia) Craig Goodwin	(Brazil) Anselmo	(Costa Rica) Óscar Duarte	(Morocco) Jawad El Yamiq	(Morocco) Fayçal Fajr	(Morocco) Munir Mohamedi	(Netherlands) Vito van Crooij	(Nigeria) Odion Ighalo	(Sudan) Abdulaziz Noor		
Damac	(Algeria) Abdelkader Bedrane	(Algeria) Farouk Chafaï	(Algeria) Moustapha Zeghba	(Cameroon) Georges-Kévin Nkoudou	(Croatia) Domagoj Antolić	(Egypt) Tarek Hamed	(The Gambia) Assan Ceesay	(Romania) Nicolae Stanciu			(Netherlands) Adam Maher

== League table ==
Pos	Team	Pld	W	D	L	GF	GA	GD	Pts	Qualification or relegation
1	Al-Hilal (C)	34	31	3	0	101	23	+78	96	Qualification for AFC Champions League Elite league stage
2	Al-Nassr	34	26	4	4	100	42	+58	82	Qualification for AFC Champions League Elite league stage
3	Al-Ahli	34	19	8	7	67	35	+32	65	Qualification for AFC Champions League Elite league stage
4	Al-Taawoun	34	16	11	7	51	35	+16	59	Qualification for AFC Champions League Two group stage
5	Al-Ittihad	34	16	6	12	63	54	+9	54	
6	Al-Ettifaq	34	12	12	10	43	34	+9	48	Qualification for the AGCFF Gulf Club Champions League group stage
7	Al-Fateh	34	12	9	13	57	55	+2	45	
8	Al-Shabab	34	12	8	14	45	42	+3	44 (Note: Al-Shabab finished ahead of Al-Fayha on overall goal difference: Al-Shabab +3, Al-Fayha −8 (Al-Fayha 0–1 Al-Shabab, Al-Shabab 2–3 Al-Fayha).)	
9	Al-Fayha	34	11	11	12	44	52	−8	44	
10	Damac	34	10	11	13	44	45	−1	41	
11	Al-Khaleej	34	9	10	15	36	47	−11	37 (Note: Al-Khaleej finished ahead of Al-Raed on head-to-head points: Al-Khaleej: 4 pts, Al-Raed: 1 pts (Al-Khaleej 0–0 Al-Raed, Al-Raed 0–1 Al-Khaleej).)	
12	Al-Raed	34	9	10	15	41	49	−8	37	
13	Al-Wehda	34	10	6	18	45	60	−15	36	
14	Al-Riyadh	34	8	11	15	33	57	−24	35	
15	Al-Okhdood	34	9	6	19	33	52	−19	33	
16	Abha (R)	34	9	5	20	38	87	−49	32	Relegation to Yelo League
17	Al-Tai (R)	34	8	7	19	34	64	−30	31	Relegation to Yelo League
18	Al-Hazem (R)	34	4	12	18	34	76	−42	24	Relegation to Yelo League

Source: SPL
Rules for classification: 1) Points; 2) Head-to-head points; 3) Head-to-head goal difference; 4) Total goal difference; 5) Total goals scored; 6) Fair-play points
(Note: Head-to-head record is used only after all the matches between the teams in question have been played).
(C) Champions; (R) Relegated

=== Positions by round ===
The following table lists the positions of teams after each week of matches. In order to preserve the chronological evolution, any postponed matches are not included in the round at which they were originally scheduled but added to the full round they were played immediately afterward.

Team ╲ Round	1	2	3	4	5	6	7	8	9	10	11	12	13	14	15	16	17	18	19	20	21	22	23	24	25	26	27	28	29	30	31	32	33	34
Al-Hilal	2	4	3	3	1	1	2	1	1	1	1	1	1	1	1	1	1	1	1	1	1	1	1	1	1	1	1	1	1	1	1	1	1	1
Al-Nassr	12	15	10	6	6	6	5	4	3	3	2	2	2	2	2	2	2	2	2	2	2	2	2	2	2	2	2	2	2	2	2	2	2	2
Al-Ahli	4	2	2	2	4	3	6	6	5	4	5	4	3	3	3	3	3	3	3	3	3	3	3	3	3	3	3	3	3	3	3	3	3	3
Al-Taawoun	9	7	5	4	2	4	3	3	2	2	3	3	4	5	5	4	4	4	4	4	4	4	5	5	5	5	5	5	4	4	4	4	4	4
Al-Ittihad	1	1	1	1	3	2	1	2	4	5	6	6	5	4	4	5	5	6	5	5	5	5	4	4	4	4	4	4	5	5	5	5	5	5
Al-Ettifaq	5	3	4	5	5	5	4	5	7	7	7	7	7	7	7	8	8	9	8	8	8	8	7	6	6	7	6	7	6	8	6	6	6	6
Al-Fateh	10	5	8	10	7	7	8	7	6	6	4	5	6	6	6	7	7	7	7	7	7	7	8	9	8	6	7	6	7	7	7	8	7	7
Al-Shabab	8	13	14	17	17	13	11	11	12	10	11	10	11	11	12	11	12	13	11	10	11	11	12	10	11	11	11	9	9	6	9	9	9	8
Al-Fayha	3	6	7	9	8	10	9	9	9	8	8	9	8	8	9	10	11	11	14	13	10	9	9	8	9	10	9	11	10	9	8	7	8	9
Damac	13	12	13	12	16	17	14	12	10	12	9	11	10	10	8	6	6	5	6	6	6	6	6	7	7	8	8	8	8	10	10	10	10	10
Al-Khaleej	16	16	16	15	12	12	10	10	11	13	13	15	12	14	14	13	10	10	10	12	12	12	11	11	10	9	10	10	11	11	11	11	11	11
Al-Raed	18	18	18	13	14	15	16	17	17	18	18	18	17	17	17	15	17	15	13	14	14	15	13	13	12	13	13	13	13	13	13	12	12	12
Al-Wehda	14	9	6	7	9	8	7	8	8	9	10	8	9	9	10	9	9	8	9	9	9	10	10	12	13	12	12	12	12	12	12	13	13	13
Al-Riyadh	7	8	9	11	15	16	17	15	13	11	12	14	14	12	13	14	15	16	15	15	15	14	15	15	14	14	14	15	14	14	14	14	14	14
Al-Okhdood	11	14	15	18	13	14	15	13	14	14	16	16	16	16	15	16	14	12	12	11	13	13	14	14	15	15	16	17	15	15	16	16	17	15
Abha	15	11	11	8	10	11	13	16	15	15	15	12	13	15	16	17	16	17	17	17	17	17	17	17	17	17	15	16	17	16	15	17	15	16
Al-Tai	6	10	12	14	11	9	12	14	16	16	14	13	15	13	11	12	13	14	16	16	16	16	16	16	16	16	17	14	16	17	17	15	16	17
Al-Hazem	17	17	17	16	18	18	18	18	18	17	17	17	18	18	18	18	18	18	18	18	18	18	18	18	18	18	18	18	18	18	18	18	18	18

Leader and AFC Champions League Elite league stage
AFC Champions League Elite league stage
AFC Champions League Two group stage
Qualification for the AGCFF Gulf Club Champions League group stage
Relegation to FD League

Source: SPL

== Results ==
Home \ Away	ABH	AHL	ETT	FAT	FAY	HAZ	HIL	ITT	KHJ	NSR	OKH	RAE	RIY	SHB	TWN	TAI	WHD	DAM
Abha		0–6	1–3	2–1	2–1	1–1	1–3	3–1	2–1	0–8	3–2	1–0	0–1	2–1	1–1	2–0	1–0	0–0
Al-Ahli	5–1		0–0	1–1	1–0	3–1	1–2	1–0	1–0	0–1	1–0	0–0	3–0	0–0	3–2	2–0	3–1	4–1
Al-Ettifaq	3–0	2–2		1–2	1–2	1–1	0–2	1–1	1–1	2–1	1–1	0–0	1–0	1–0	0–2	4–3	0–0	3–1
Al-Fateh	4–1	5–1	1–0		0–1	2–1	0–2	2–4	1–2	0–5	0–0	3–1	2–2	1–1	1–1	0–1	5–1	1–1
Al-Fayha	3–2	0–4	0–0	2–2		0–0	0–2	0–0	3–1	1–3	3–0	0–0	1–1	0–1	1–1	1–0	1–2	2–4
Al-Hazem	2–1	0–4	0–2	2–0	1–3		0–9	2–3	1–1	1–5	0–0	4–3	1–1	0–3	1–3	1–1	1–2	0–0
Al-Hilal	7–0	3–1	2–0	3–1	1–1	4–1		3–1	1–0	3–0	3–0	3–1	6–1	2–0	2–0	3–1	2–0	2–1
Al-Ittihad	4–2	0–1	0–5	2–1	3–1	2–2	3–4		4–2	2–5	2–1	1–3	2–0	1–3	0–0	2–0	2–1	4–1
Al-Khaleej	3–1	1–3	0–2	1–3	3–0	1–1	1–4	1–1		0–1	2–2	0–0	1–2	0–0	1–1	3–1	1–2	0–2
Al-Nassr	2–2	4–3	3–1	2–1	3–1	4–4	1–1	4–2	2–0		3–0	1–3	4–1	4–0	0–2	5–1	6–0	2–1
Al-Okhdood	4–0	3–2	1–0	1–3	1–2	2–1	0–3	0–1	0–1	2–3		1–3	1–2	1–0	0–1	1–0	1–1	1–2
Al-Raed	4–3	0–0	2–2	1–2	1–2	2–0	0–4	0–3	0–1	1–3	1–2		3–0	2–1	0–0	1–1	2–0	0–1
Al-Riyadh	1–1	2–1	1–0	1–1	1–3	0–0	1–3	0–4	0–1	2–2	0–1	1–1		2–2	0–0	1–2	1–0	1–0
Al-Shabab	5–0	1–2	0–0	3–2	2–3	4–1	3–4	1–0	1–3	2–3	1–1	2–0	1–0		1–2	2–0	1–0	1–1
Al-Taawoun	1–0	0–1	1–0	1–3	4–1	4–0	0–3	1–1	1–1	1–4	3–1	2–1	1–2	1–0		3–0	4–1	0–0
Al-Tai	1–0	1–4	1–1	3–1	3–3	1–0	1–2	0–3	0–0	1–2	0–2	4–3	3–2	0–0	2–3		0–3	1–0
Al-Wehda	4–0	1–1	2–3	2–3	1–1	0–2	1–2	0–3	3–1	1–3	2–0	0–1	3–1	3–1	3–3	1–1		4–2
Damac	4–2	2–2	0–2	2–2	1–1	4–1	1–1	3–1	0–1	0–1	2–0	1–1	2–2	0–1	0–1	3–0	1–0	

Source: SPL
Legend: Blue = home team win; Yellow = draw; Red = away team win.
For upcoming matches, an "a" indicates there is an article about the rivalry between the two participants.

== Season statistics ==
=== Top scorers ===
Rank	Player	Club	Goals
1	(Portugal) Cristiano Ronaldo	Al-Nassr	35
2	(Serbia) Aleksandar Mitrović	Al-Hilal	28
3	(Morocco) Abderrazak Hamdallah	Al-Ittihad	19
3	(Zambia) Fashion Sakala	Al-Fayha	19
5	(Saudi Arabia) Firas Al-Buraikan	Al-Fateh/Al-Ahli	17
6	(Brazil) Talisca	Al-Nassr	16
7	(Brazil) Malcom	Al-Hilal	15
7	(Cameroon) Georges-Kévin Nkoudou	Damac	15
7	(Nigeria) Odion Ighalo	Al-Wehda	15
10	(Ghana) Bernard Mensah	Al-Tai	14
10	(Saudi Arabia) Salem Al-Dawsari	Al-Hilal	14

==== Hat-tricks ====
Player	For	Against	Result	Date	Ref.
(Brazil) Roberto Firmino	Al-Ahli	Al-Hazem	3–1 (H)	11 August 2023	
(Brazil) Malcom	Al-Hilal	Abha	3–1 (A)	14 August 2023	
(Portugal) Cristiano Ronaldo	Al-Nassr	Al-Fateh	5–0 (A)	25 August 2023	
(Serbia) Aleksandar Mitrović	Al-Hilal	Al-Ittihad	4–3 (A)	1 September 2023	
(Nigeria) Odion Ighalo	Al-Wehda	Damac	4–2 (H)	14 September 2023	
(Ghana) Bernard Mensah	Al-Tai	Al-Ettifaq	3–4 (A)	21 September 2023	
(Spain) Cristian Tello	Al-Fateh	Al-Wehda	5–1 (H)	30 September 2023	
(France) Karim Benzema	Al-Ittihad	Abha	4–2 (H)	10 November 2023	
(Brazil) Malcom	Al-Hilal	Al Hazem	9–0 (A)	25 November 2023	
(Nigeria) Odion Ighalo	Al-Wehda	Al-Khaleej	3–1 (H)	25 November 2023	
(Cameroon) Georges-Kévin Nkoudou	Damac	Abha	4–2 (H)	25 November 2023	
(Serbia) Sergej Milinković-Savić	Al-Hilal	Abha	7–0 (H)	21 December 2023	
(Brazil) Talisca	Al-Nassr	Al Hazem	4–4 (H)	29 February 2024	
(Portugal) Cristiano Ronaldo	Al-Nassr	Al-Tai	5–1 (H)	30 March 2024	
(Portugal) Cristiano Ronaldo	Al-Nassr	Abha	8–0 (A)	2 April 2024	
(Portugal) Cristiano Ronaldo	Al-Nassr	Al-Wehda	6–0 (H)	4 May 2024	
(Cameroon) Karl Toko Ekambi	Al-Ettifaq	Al-Ittihad	5–0 (A)	10 May 2024	

Note

(H) – Home; (A) – Away

=== Most assists ===
Rank	Player	Club	Assists
1	(Algeria) Riyad Mahrez	Al-Ahli	13
2	(Portugal) Rúben Neves	Al-Hilal	12
3	(Portugal) Cristiano Ronaldo	Al-Nassr	11
4	(Spain) Álvaro Medrán	Al-Taawoun/Al-Ettifaq	10
4	(Serbia) Sergej Milinković-Savić	Al-Hilal	10
6	(France) Allan Saint-Maximin	Al-Ahli	9
6	(Armenia) Lucas Zelarayán	Al-Fateh	9
8	(Morocco) Mourad Batna	Al-Fateh	8
8	(Morocco) Fayçal Fajr	Al-Wehda	8
8	(Senegal) Sadio Mané	Al-Nassr	8
8	(Saudi Arabia) Firas Al-Buraikan	Al-Fateh/Al-Ahli	8
8	(Croatia) Marcelo Brozović	Al-Nassr	8

=== Clean sheets ===
Rank	Player	Club	Clean sheets
1	(Morocco) Yassine Bounou	Al-Hilal	15
1	(Senegal) Édouard Mendy	Al-Ahli	15
3	(Brazil) Mailson	Al-Taawoun	13
4	(Brazil) Paulo Victor	Al-Ettifaq	12
5	(Portugal) André Moreira	Al-Raed	8
5	(Bosnia and Herzegovina) Ibrahim Šehić	Al-Khaleej	8
7	(Brazil) Marcelo Grohe	Al-Ittihad	7
7	(Brazil) Paulo Vítor	Al-Okhdood	7
9	(Serbia) Vladimir Stojković	Al-Fayha	6
9	(South Korea) Kim Seung-gyu	Al-Shabab	6
9	(Tunisia) Aymen Dahmen	Al-Hazem	6
9	(Uruguay) Martín Campaña	Al-Riyadh	6

=== Discipline ===
==== Player ====
- Most yellow cards: 13
  - (Brazil) Roger Ibañez (Al-Ahli)
  - (Brazil) Iago Santos (Al-Shabab)
- Most red cards: 2
  - (Argentina) Éver Banega (Al-Shabab)
  - (Brazil) Roger Ibañez (Al-Ahli)
  - (Jamaica) Demarai Gray (Al-Ettifaq)
  - (Saudi Arabia) Madallah Al-Olayan (Al-Ittihad)
  - (Saudi Arabia) Sanousi Hawsawi (Damac)
  - (Saudi Arabia) Abdulbasit Hindi (Al-Ahli)

==== Club ====
- Most yellow cards: 77
  - Al-Tai
- Most red cards: 8
  - Al-Shabab

== Attendances ==
=== By round ===
2023–24 Professional League Attendance
Round	Total	GP.	Avg. Per Game
Round 1	61,067	9	6,785
Round 2	122,911	9	13,657
Round 3	78,796	9	8,755
Round 4	75,322	9	8,369
Round 5	57,658	9	6,406
Round 6	63,959	9	7,107
Round 7	67,028	9	7,448
Round 8	57,346	9	6,372
Round 9	102,603	9	11,400
Round 10	75,632	9	8,404
Round 11	80,161	9	8,907
Round 12	78,458	9	8,718
Round 13	77,550	9	8,617
Round 14	77,158	9	8,573
Round 15	90,054	9	10,006
Round 16	68,132	9	7,570
Round 17	53,391	9	5,932
Round 18	56,237	9	6,249
Round 19	70,048	9	7,783
Round 20	56,986	9	6,332
Round 21	83,096	9	9,233
Round 22	94,146	9	10,461
Round 23	72,055	9	8,006
Round 24	103,232	9	11,470
Round 25	51,579	9	5,731
Round 26	102,719	9	11,413
Round 27	63,781	9	7,087
Round 28	77,741	9	8,638
Round 29	63,747	9	7,083
Round 30	75,064	9	8,340
Round 31	53,837	9	5,982
Round 32	71,640	9	7,960
Round 33	57,436	9	6,382
Round 34	55,940	9	6,216
Total	2,496,510	306	8,159

=== By team ===
Pos	Team	Total	High	Low	Average	Change
1	Al-Ahli	414,282	52,037	8,489	24,370	+70.3%^{†}
2	Al-Hilal	371,012	59,600	8,505	21,824	+128.7%
3	Al-Ittihad	305,495	55,764	3,650	17,970	−55.6%
4	Al-Nassr	302,865	23,774	6,093	17,822	+1.0%
5	Al-Fateh	139,977	18,097	2,885	8,234	−23.7%
6	Al-Ettifaq	124,281	13,930	2,281	7,311	+31.5%
7	Al-Taawoun	115,880	20,050	3,170	6,816	−6.8%
8	Al-Shabab	111,503	13,475	987	6,564	+43.0%
9	Al-Raed	107,827	20,630	1,453	6,342	+6.2%
10	Al-Tai	104,493	10,898	1,172	6,147	−15.7%
11	Al-Khaleej	91,048	17,300	1,500	5,356	−5.0%
12	Damac	73,674	14,556	312	4,334	+4.7%
13	Abha	51,957	12,079	210	3,056	−15.0%
14	Al-Wehda	44,757	10,727	365	2,633	−60.8%
15	Al-Fayha	39,116	10,081	294	2,301	−40.4%
16	Al-Okhdood	37,012	7,585	439	2,243	n/a^{†}
17	Al-Riyadh	31,642	8,618	133	1,861	n/a^{†}
18	Al-Hazem	28,409	12,297	117	1,671	n/a^{†}
	League total	2,496,661	59,600	117	8,159	−12.6%

Notes:
^{†} Teams played previous season in FD League.

== Awards ==
=== Monthly awards ===
Month	Manager of the Month		Player of the Month		Goalkeeper of the Month		Rising Star of the Month		Reference
Month	Manager	Club	Player	Club	Player	Club	Player	Club	Reference
August	(Portugal) Nuno Espírito Santo	Al-Ittihad	(Portugal) Cristiano Ronaldo	Al-Nassr	(Brazil) Marcelo Grohe	Al-Ittihad	(Saudi Arabia) Abdulmalik Al-Oyayari	Al-Taawoun	
September	(Portugal) Luís Castro	Al-Nassr	(Portugal) Cristiano Ronaldo	Al-Nassr	(Brazil) Marcelo Grohe	Al-Ittihad	(Saudi Arabia) Muath Faqeehi	Al-Taawoun	
October	(Portugal) Jorge Jesus	Al-Hilal	(Serbia) Sergej Milinković-Savić	Al-Hilal	(Morocco) Yassine Bounou	Al-Hilal	(Saudi Arabia) Abbas Al-Hassan	Al-Fateh	
November	(Portugal) Jorge Jesus	Al-Hilal	(Ghana) Bernard Mensah	Al-Tai	(Morocco) Yassine Bounou	Al-Hilal	(Saudi Arabia) Faisal Al-Ghamdi	Al-Ittihad	
December	(Portugal) Jorge Jesus	Al-Hilal	(Portugal) Cristiano Ronaldo	Al-Nassr	(Senegal) Édouard Mendy	Al-Ahli	(Saudi Arabia) Abdulelah Hawsawi	Al-Khaleej	
February	(Portugal) Jorge Jesus	Al-Hilal	(Brazil) Talisca	Al-Nassr	(Morocco) Yassine Bounou	Al-Hilal	(Saudi Arabia) Mohammed Al-Absi	Al-Shabab	
March	(Portugal) Jorge Jesus	Al-Hilal	(Portugal) Cristiano Ronaldo	Al-Nassr	(Brazil) Mailson	Al-Taawoun	(Saudi Arabia) Ahmed Al-Ghamdi	Al-Ittihad	
April	(Portugal) Vítor Pereira	Al-Shabab	(Belgium) Yannick Carrasco	Al-Shabab	(Colombia) David Ospina	Al-Nassr	(Saudi Arabia) Musab Al-Juwayr	Al-Shabab	
May	(Portugal) Jorge Jesus	Al-Hilal	(Portugal) Cristiano Ronaldo	Al-Nassr	(Brazil) Mailson	Al-Taawoun	(Saudi Arabia) Abdulmalik Al-Oyayari	Al-Taawoun	

=== Annual awards ===
Award	Winner	Club	Ref.
Golden Boot	(Portugal) Cristiano Ronaldo	Al-Nassr	
Goalkeeper of the Season	(Morocco) Yassine Bounou	Al-Hilal	
Manager of the Season	(Portugal) Jorge Jesus	Al-Hilal	
Goal of the Season	(Portugal) Cristiano Ronaldo	Al-Nassr	

=== Team of the Season ===
Team of the Season
Goalkeeper	(Brazil) Paulo Victor (Al-Ettifaq)			
Defenders	(Saudi Arabia) Saud Abdulhamid (Al-Hilal)		(Senegal) Kalidou Koulibaly (Al-Hilal)	(Portugal) Pedro Rebocho (Al-Khaleej)
Midfielders	(Serbia) Sergej Milinković-Savić (Al-Hilal)	(Portugal) Rúben Neves (Al-Hilal)	(Portugal) Otávio (Al-Nassr)	(Spain) Álvaro Medrán (Al-Ettifaq)
Forwards	(Portugal) Cristiano Ronaldo (Al-Nassr)		(Serbia) Aleksandar Mitrović (Al-Hilal)	(Algeria) Riyad Mahrez (Al-Ahli)
