= Prix Marc-Vivien Foé =

Award in Ligue 1

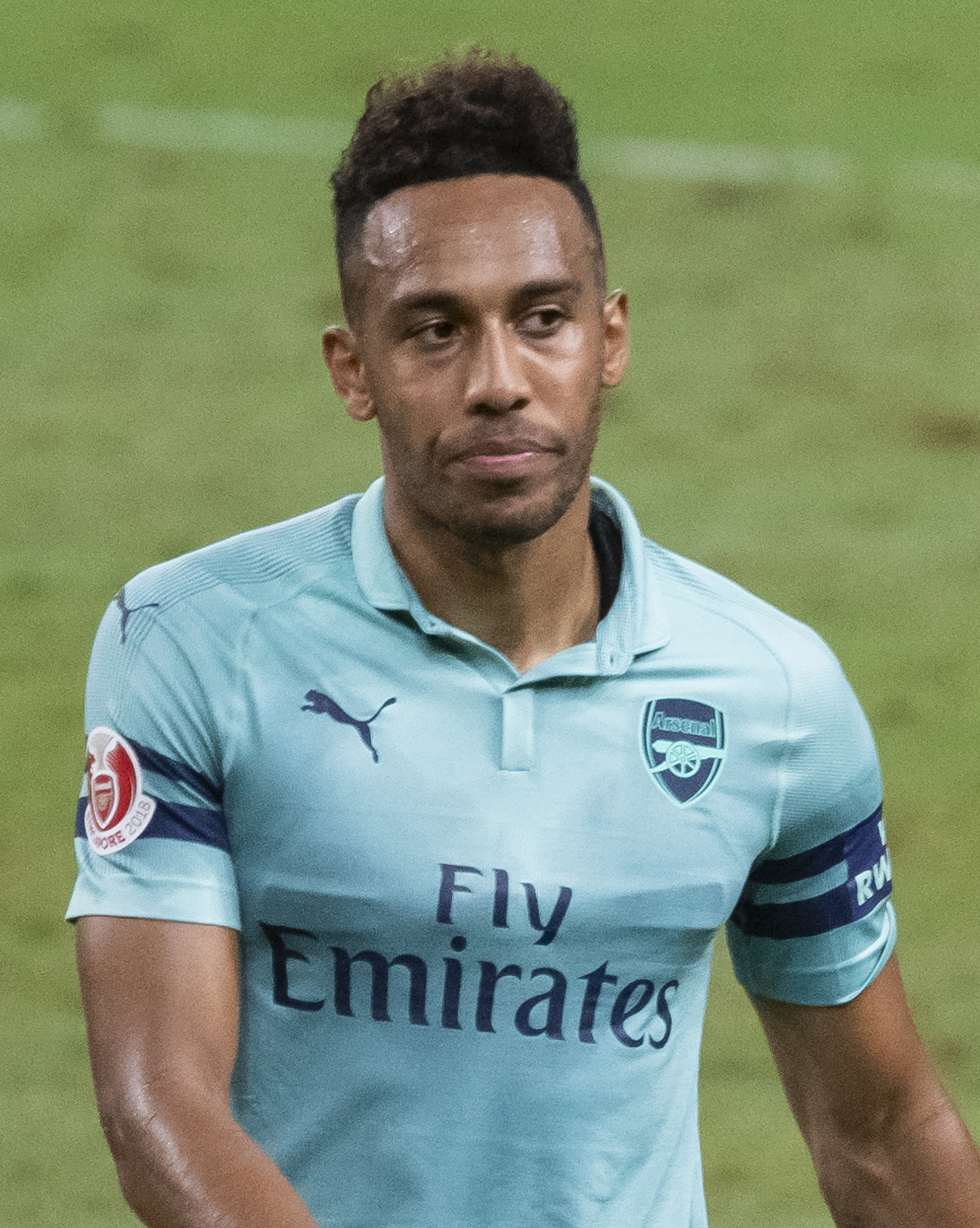
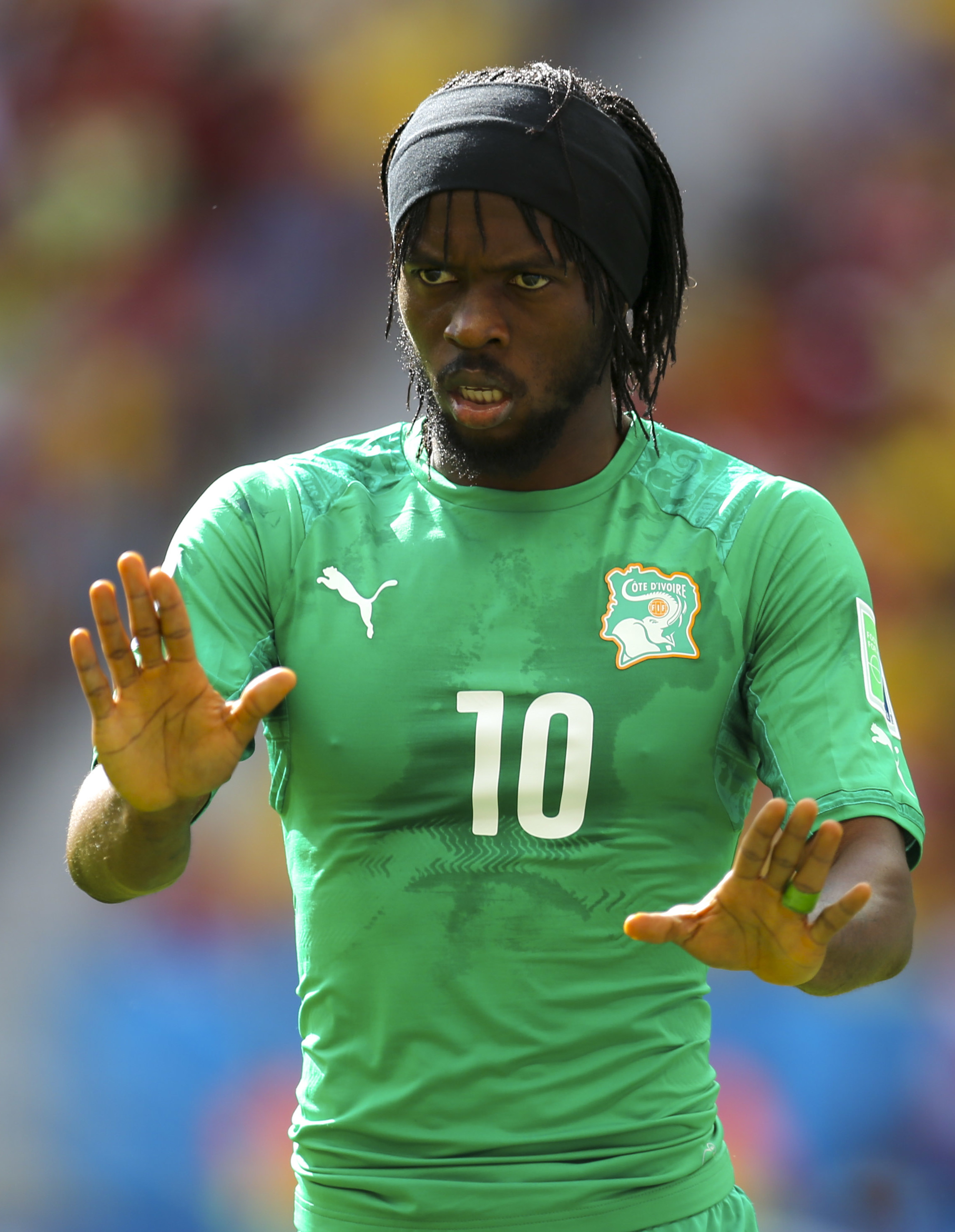
- Pierre-Emerick Aubameyang and Gervinho have won the award two times, more than any other players.
- Sport: Association football
- League: Ligue 1
- Awarded for: Being the best performing African player in a Ligue 1 season
- Country: France
- Presented by: Radio France Internationale (RFI) & France 24

History
- First award: 2009; 17 years ago
- Editions: 16 (as of 2024)
- First winner: (Morocco) Marouane Chamakh
- Most wins: 2 awards: (Gabon) Pierre-Emerick Aubameyang; (Ivory Coast) Gervinho
- Most recent: (Morocco) Achraf Hakimi (2024–25)

The Prix Marc-Vivien Foé is an annual award in honour to the late Marc-Vivien Foé, given to the African player deemed to have performed the best over the previous season in Ligue 1.

The most recent winner is Achraf Hakimi.

== Winners ==
Prix Marc-Vivien Foé awardees
Season	Player	Nationality	Club	Position	Ref.
2008–09	Marouane Chamakh	Morocco	Bordeaux	Forward	
2009–10	Gervinho	Ivory Coast	Lille	Forward	
2010–11	Gervinho (2)	Ivory Coast	Lille	Forward	
2011–12	Younès Belhanda	Morocco	Montpellier	Midfielder	
2012–13	Pierre-Emerick Aubameyang	Gabon	Saint-Étienne	Forward	
2013–14	Vincent Enyeama	Nigeria	Lille	Goalkeeper	
2014–15	André Ayew	Ghana	Marseille	Midfielder	
2015–16	Sofiane Boufal	Morocco	Lille	Midfielder	
2016−17	Jean Michaël Seri	Ivory Coast	Nice	Midfielder	
2017−18	Karl Toko Ekambi	Cameroon	Angers	Forward	
2018−19	Nicolas Pépé	Ivory Coast	Lille	Midfielder	
2019−20	Victor Osimhen	Nigeria	Lille	Forward	
2020−21	Gaël Kakuta	Congo DR	Lens	Midfielder	
2021−22	Seko Fofana	Ivory Coast	Lens	Midfielder	
2022−23	Chancel Mbemba	Congo DR	Marseille	Defender	
2023−24	Pierre-Emerick Aubameyang (2)	Gabon	Marseille	Forward	
2024−25	Achraf Hakimi	Morocco	PSG	Right Back	

=== Awards won by club ===
Prix Marc-Vivien Foé awardees by club
Club	Total
Lille	6
Marseille	3
Lens	2
Angers	1
Bordeaux	1
Montpellier	1
Nice	1
Saint-Étienne	1
PSG	1

=== Awards won by nationality ===
Prix Marc-Vivien Foé awardees by nationality
Nationality	Total
Ivory Coast	5
Morocco	4
Gabon	2
Congo DR	2
Nigeria	2
Cameroon	1
Ghana	1

=== Awards won by playing position ===
Prix Marc-Vivien Foé awardees by playing position
Position	Total
Midfielder	7
Forward	7
Defender	2
Goalkeeper	1
