= Abbas Al-Hassan =

Saudi Arabian footballer

Abbas Al-Hassan عباس الحسن
Personal information
- Full name: Abbas Sadiq Nasser Al-Hassan
- Date of birth: 22 February 2004 (age 22)
- Place of birth: Al-Hasa, Saudi Arabia
- Height: 1.74 m (5 ft 9 in)
- Position: Midfielder

Team information
- Current team: Neom
- Number: 6

Youth career
- –2021: Al-Fateh

Senior career*
Years	Team	Apps	(Gls)
2021–2024	Al-Fateh	37	(2)
2024–	Neom	41	(4)

International career^{‡}
2021–2023	Saudi Arabia U20	0	(0)
2023–	Saudi Arabia U23		
2023–	Saudi Arabia	4	(0)
- * Club domestic league appearances and goals as of 5 November 2026 ‡ National team caps and goals as of 5 September 2024

Abbas Sadiq Nasser Al-Hassan (Arabic: عَبَّاس صَادِق نَاصِر الْحَسَن; born 22 February 2004) is a Saudi Arabian professional footballer who plays as a midfielder for Saudi Pro League club Neom and the Saudi Arabia national team.

== Club career ==
Al-Hassan began his career with the youth team of Al-Fateh. He made his debut on 1 January 2021 in the league match against Damac, replacing Saqer Otaif. By doing so he became the youngest player to ever appear in the Saudi Professional League – breaking the record previously held by Fahad Al-Muwallad. On 9 February 2021, Al-Hassan made his first start for the club in the 1–1 draw against Al-Nassr. On 2 September 2022, Al-Hassan signed his first professional contract with the club.

On 27 June 2024, Al-Hassan joined Saudi First Division League club Neom on a five-year contract.

== Personal life ==
Abbas Al-Hassan is the younger brother of Al-Nassr player Ali Al-Hassan.

== Career statistics ==
=== Club ===
As of 27 May 2024

Club	Season	League		King Cup		Asia		Other		Total	
Club	Season	Apps	Goals	Apps	Goals	Apps	Goals	Apps	Goals	Apps	Goals
Al-Fateh	2020–21	6	0	1	0	—		—		7	0
Al-Fateh	2021–22	6	0	1	0	—		—		7	0
Al-Fateh	2022–23	0	0	0	0	—		—		0	0
Al-Fateh	2023–24	25	2	2	0	—		—		27	2
Al-Fateh	Total	37	2	4	0	0	0	0	0	41	2
Career totals		37	2	4	0	0	0	0	0	41	2

== Honours ==
Saudi Arabia U20

- Arab Cup U-20: 2021
- Arab Games Gold medal: 2023

Individual

- Saudi Pro League Rising Star of the Month: October 2023, September 2025
