= Al Tazaj =

BBQ chicken Arabic fast casual restaurant chain

- Native name: الطازج
- Industry: Restaurants
- Founded: 1989; 37 years ago Mecca, Saudi Arabia
- Founder: Abdul Rahman Fakieh
- Headquarters: Jeddah, Saudi Arabia
- Website: www.taza.com.sa www.tazauae.com/index.php tazaj.jo

Al Tazaj (Arabic: الطازج) or also known as Taza in the UAE Market, focuses on BBQ and Fried Chicken, Saudi fast-casual restaurant chain headquartered in Jeddah, Saudi Arabia.

== History ==
Al Tazaj was founded in 1989 in Mecca by Abdul Rahman Fakieh. The company is headquartered in Jeddah, Saudi Arabia.

== Operations ==
Al Tazaj specialises in flame-grilled chicken prepared with a proprietary blend of sauces. Chickens are delivered fresh daily from Fakieh Poultry Farms. The company emphasises quality sourcing and rapid expansion. It continues to grow through franchising and investment in new international markets.

=== Locations ===
Al Tazaj has approximately 100 branches in Saudi Arabia. Many more restaurants out of its home country, Saudi Arabia are also located in Jordan with seven branches, Morocco formerly had one branch in Casablanca but closed due to unknown reasons, and the United Arab Emirates with five branches in Dubai, 2 in both Abu Dhabi and Sharjah, and one in Ajman. However, as of 2025, all branches in the UAE closed due to multiple food safety violations. Kuwait formerly had 3 branches but has currently been shut down due to unknown circumstances, and one branch in Qatar closed.

Table Of Activity
Country	Number Of Branches	Status	Year Opened	Year Shut Down
Saudi Arabia	121 Branches	Active	1989 (Mecca)	Operating
Jordan	7 Branches	Active	2003 (Amman)	Operating
Morocco	1 Branch	Unknown	2013 (Casablanca)	Unknown
United Arab Emirates	10 Branches	Inactive	Mid 2010s (Dubai)	Mid 2024
Kuwait	3 Branches	Inactive	Mid 2010s (Kuwait City)	Early 2021
Qatar	1 Branch	Inactive	1997 (Doha)	Late 2018

== See also ==
- List of fast-food chicken restaurants
- Saudi cuisine
