= Karl Toko Ekambi =

Footballer (born 1992)

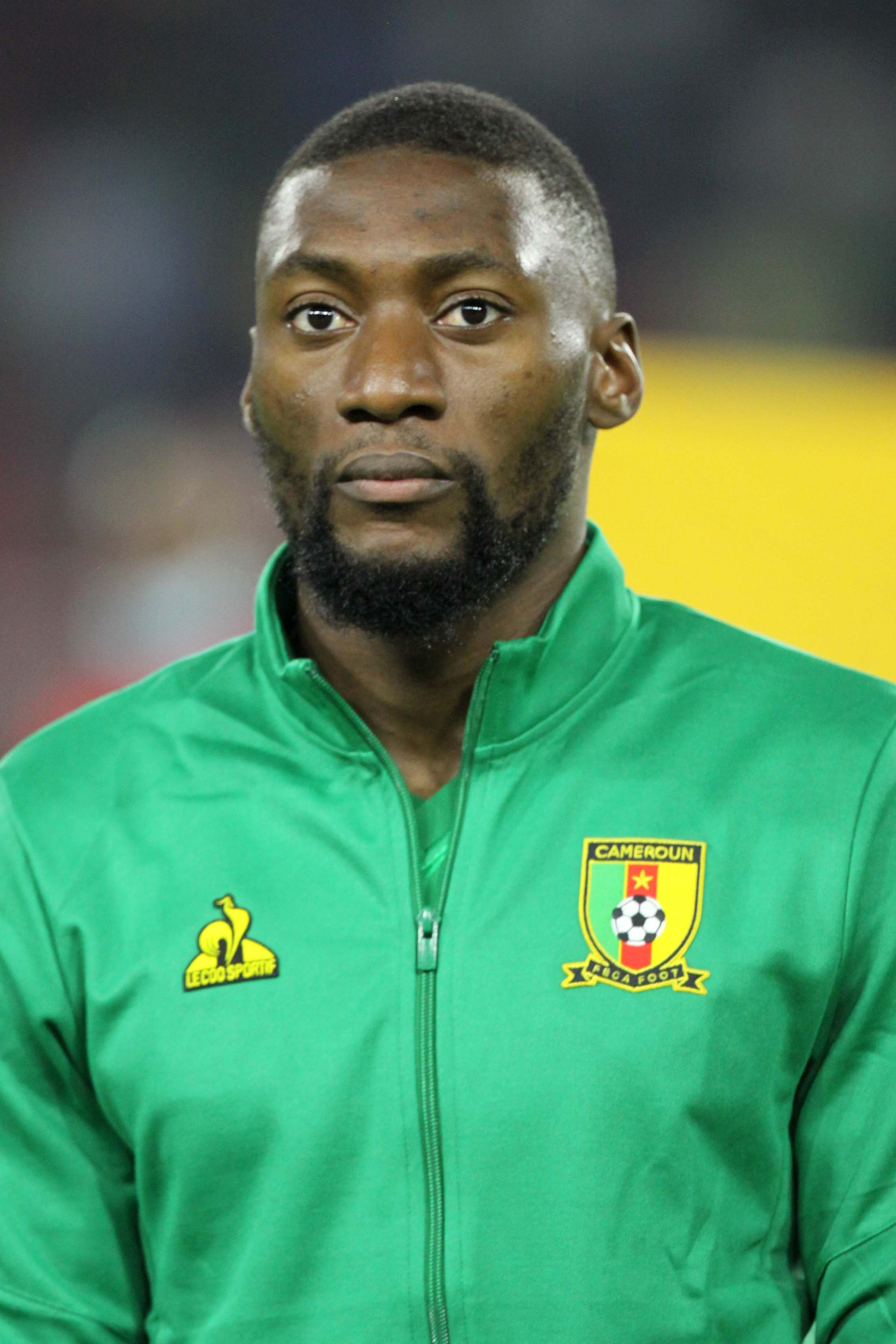
- Toko Ekambi with Cameroon at the 2021 Africa Cup of Nations

Personal information
- Full name: Karl Louis-Brillant Toko Ekambi
- Date of birth: 14 September 1992 (age 34)
- Place of birth: Paris, France
- Height: 1.83 m (6 ft 0 in)
- Position: Forward

Youth career
- –2010: Paris FC

Senior career*
Years	Team	Apps	(Gls)
2010–2014	Paris FC	67	(21)
2012–2013	Paris FC B	6	(1)
2014–2016	Sochaux	72	(25)
2016–2018	Angers	68	(24)
2018–2020	Villarreal	52	(16)
2020	→ Lyon (loan)	8	(2)
2020–2023	Lyon	84	(30)
2023	→ Rennes (loan)	17	(3)
2023–2024	Abha	14	(5)
2024–2025	Al-Ettifaq	39	(7)
2025–2026	Al-Fateh	7	(0)
2026	Al-Arabi	9	(5)

International career^{‡}
2015–2024	Cameroon	61	(14)
Medal record
Men's football
Representing Cameroon
Africa Cup of Nations
Winner	2017
Third place	2021
- * Club domestic league appearances and goals as of 23:57, 22 November 2025 (UTC) ‡ National team caps and goals as of 23:06, 27 January 2024 (UTC)

Karl Louis-Brillant Toko Ekambi (born 14 September 1992) is a professional footballer who plays as a forward.

Toko Ekambi began his career with Paris FC in the Championnat National and Sochaux in Ligue 2 before joining Angers in Ligue 1. After 18 months at Villarreal in Spain's La Liga, he returned to France's top flight with Lyon.

Born and raised in France, Toko Ekambi played for Cameroon internationally, making his senior debut in 2015. He represented the nation at the Africa Cup of Nations in 2017, 2019, 2021 and 2023, winning the 2017 tournament. He also played at the 2022 FIFA World Cup.

== Club career ==
=== Sochaux ===
Born in Paris, Toko Ekambi began his career at Paris FC in the third-tier Championnat National. In June 2014, having been third-top scorer with 13 goals, he transferred to Sochaux. He made his Ligue 2 debut on the opening day of the 2014–15 season against Orléans, as a 57th-minute substitute for Thomas Guerbert in a 1–0 home loss. He ended his first season as joint-fourth top scorer with 14 goals.

=== Angers ===
In June 2016, Toko Ekambi joined Angers for €1 million, on a four-year deal. He scored seven times in his first Ligue 1 season, including two in a 3–0 home win over Bastia on 26 February.

In August 2017, Brighton & Hove Albion, newly promoted to the Premier League, reportedly made a bid for him, offering €8 million plus €1 million in possible bonuses to Angers. He began that season in good form, scoring nine goals in 18 Ligue 1 appearances in the first half of the season, attracting interest from England for his services in the January transfer window.

In January 2018 Brighton were again reported to have made a bid for him, which was rejected by Angers. On 24 February, Toko Ekambi scored two-second-half goals, including the winner in the 89th minute, to help Angers move out of the relegation zone in a 2–1 away win over fellow strugglers Lille. He finished the 2017–18 Ligue 1 season with 17 goals, ninth in the league's top scorers. He won the Prix Marc-Vivien Foé for best African in the league. He was the first Cameroonian to win the award named after Marc-Vivien Foé, who died playing for the country in 2003.

On 25 April 2017, late substitute Toko Ekambi scored in a 2–0 home win over Guingamp in the Coupe de France semi-final. In Angers' first final since 1957 on 27 May, he played the entirety of a 1–0 loss to Paris Saint-Germain (PSG).

=== Villarreal ===
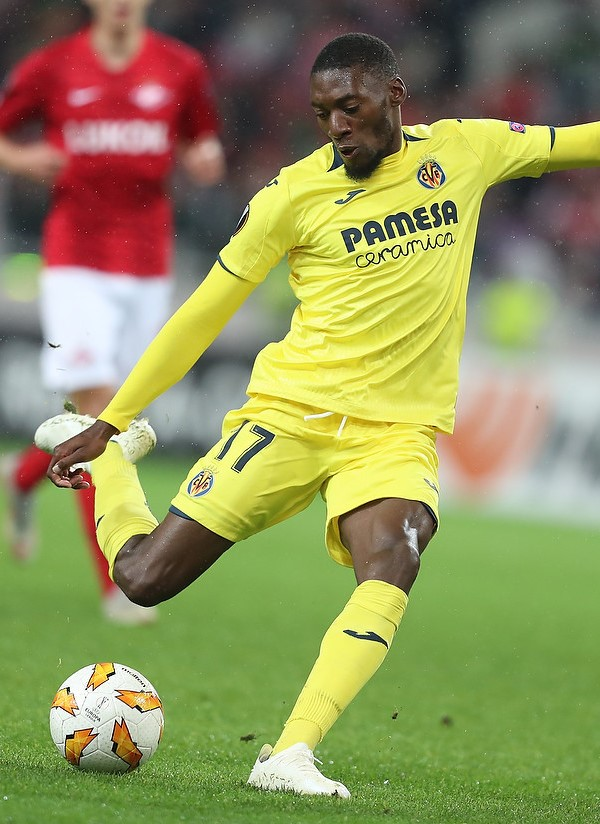
Toko Ekambi playing for Villarreal in 2018

In June 2018, Toko Ekambi signed with Villarreal in Spain's La Liga, for an estimated €20 million. He was signed to replace Cédric Bakambu, who had left for the Chinese Super League in January. He scored ten goals in his first league season, including two in a 3–1 home win over Rayo Vallecano on 17 March.

With five goals each, Toko Ekambi and Getafe's Ángel were top scorers of the 2018–19 Copa del Rey. This included four in an 8–0 (11–3 aggregate) home win over Almería in the last 32 second leg, followed by a goal in the next stage against Espanyol, who eliminated his team.

Toko Ekambi was the La Liga Player of the Month for October 2019, with three goals including two in a 4–1 win over Alavés on 25 October.

=== Lyon ===
On 20 January 2020, Toko Ekambi went back to Ligue 1, on loan to Lyon for the remainder of the season. On 2 June, he moved on a permanent transfer with a four-year contract, for a fee of €11.5 million. He played in the 2020 Coupe de la Ligue Final on 31 July, the last game in the competition's history. On as an 80th-minute substitute for Memphis Depay, he scored in the penalty shootout after a goalless draw, but his team lost to PSG.

With 14 goals in 2020–21, Toko Ekambi was once again joint ninth top scorer in Ligue 1. The following season, he finished joint tenth with 12 goals.

==== Loan to Rennes ====
On 26 January 2023, fellow Ligue 1 club Rennes announced the signing of Toko Ekambi on loan from Lyon for the remainder of the season. The fee was €1.5 million, with a further €1 million depending on performances. He scored his first goal for the club on 19 March to open a 2–0 win at PSG, ending a 35-game unbeaten home run for the hosts dating back nearly two years.

=== Abha ===
On 24 August 2023, Toko Ekambi joined Saudi Pro League club Abha on a two-year deal.

=== Al-Ettifaq ===
On 30 January 2024, Toko Ekambi joined fellow Saudi Pro League club Al-Ettifaq on a one-and-a-half-year contract.

=== Al-Fateh ===
On 10 September 2025, after the expiry of Toko Ekambi's contract at Al-Ettifaq, he joined another Saudi Pro League side Al Fateh on a one-year deal.

=== Al-Arabi ===
On 4 January 2026, just six months after Toko Ekambi's signing at Al Fateh, he mutually terminated his contract with them, and joined Qatar Stars League side Al-Arabi on a six-month contract.

== International career ==
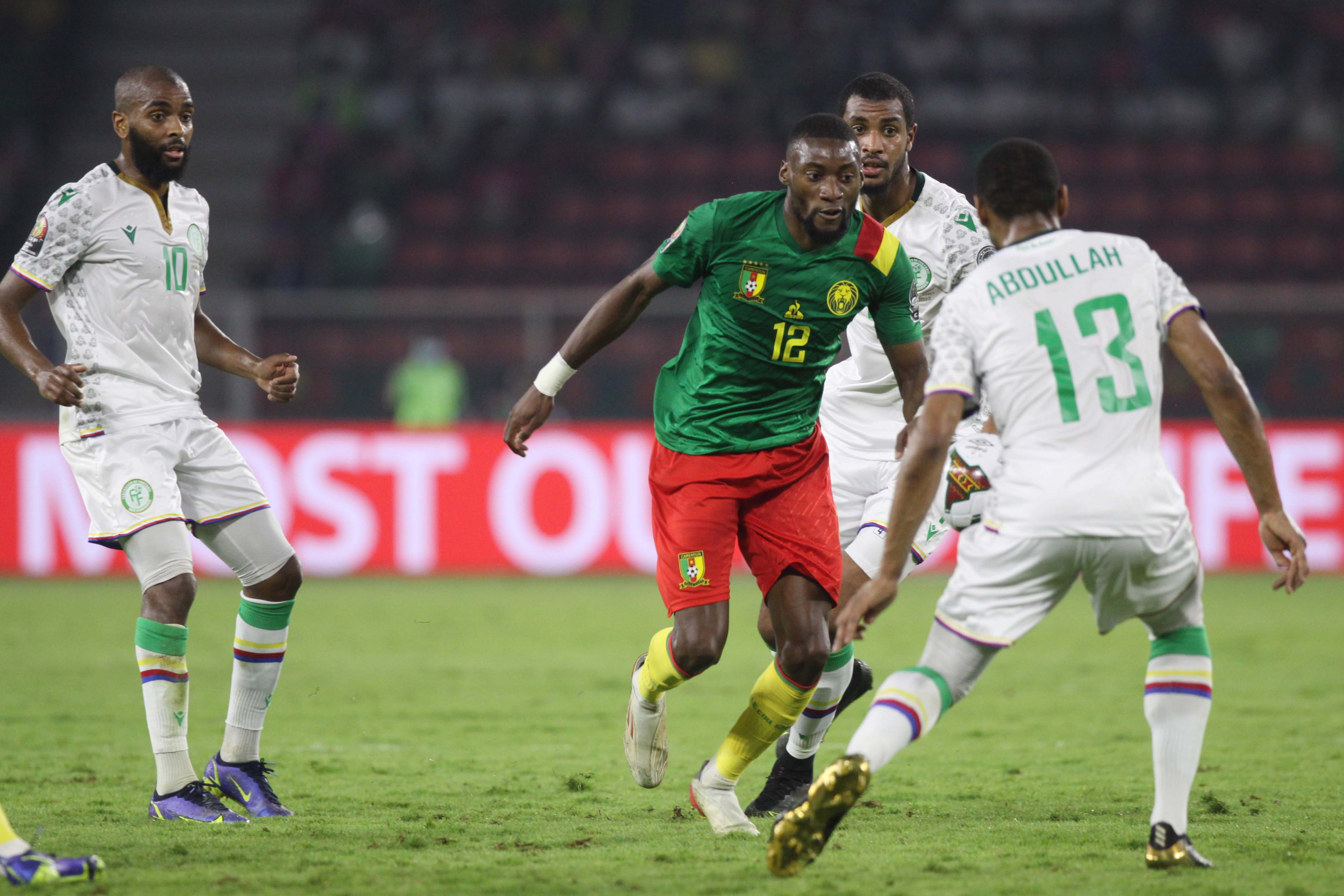
Toko Ekambi playing against Comoros in the 2021 Africa Cup of Nations

Toko Ekambi made his debut for Cameroon on 6 June 2015 in a 3–2 friendly win over Burkina Faso in Colombes, France, as a 66th-minute substitute for Justin Mengolo. He scored his first goal on 3 September the following year in a 2–0 home win over the Gambia in 2017 Africa Cup of Nations qualification. Manager Hugo Broos called him up for the final tournament in Gabon, which the team won.

On 28 March 2017, Toko Ekambi scored and was sent off in a 2–1 friendly loss to Guinea in Brussels. In June, Broos selected him for the 2017 Confederations Cup in Russia. He also went to the 2019 Africa Cup of Nations in Egypt.

At the 2021 Africa Cup of Nations on home soil at the start of the following year, Toko Ekambi scored twice in a 4–1 group win over Ethiopia, and the opening goal of a 2–1 win against Comoros in the last 16. On 29 January, he scored both goals against the Gambia in the quarter-finals.

On 29 March 2022, Toko Ekambi scored a goal in the fourth minute of time added on at the end of extra time against Algeria to send Cameroon to the 2022 FIFA World Cup. At the finals in Qatar, he started the first two games and was a substitute in the 1–0 win over Brazil, as the team exited in the group stage.

At the 2023 Africa Cup of Nations in the Ivory Coast, Toko Ekambi was dropped by manager Rigobert Song in the second group game against Senegal; fellow striker Vincent Aboubakar was injured and the team lost 3–1. He returned and scored the opening goal of a 3–2 win against the Gambia that put Cameroon into the last 16 at their opponents' expense. On 2 February 2024, he announced his retirement from international duty after the tournament.

== Career statistics ==
=== Club ===
As of match played 29 November 2025

Appearances and goals by club, season and competition
Club	Season	League			National cup (Note: Includes Coupe de France, Copa del Rey, King's Cup)		League cup (Note: Includes Coupe de la Ligue)		Continental		Other		Total	
Club	Season	Division	Apps	Goals	Apps	Goals	Apps	Goals	Apps	Goals	Apps	Goals	Apps	Goals
Paris FC	2010–11	Championnat National	2	0	0	0	0	0	—		—		2	0
Paris FC	2011–12	Championnat National	25	3	1	0	0	0	—		—		26	3
Paris FC	2012–13	Championnat National	14	4	0	0	0	0	—		—		14	4
Paris FC	2013–14	Championnat National	26	14	0	0	0	0	—		—		26	14
Paris FC	Total		67	21	1	0	0	0	—		—		68	21
Sochaux	2014–15	Ligue 2	38	14	1	0	1	0	—		—		40	14
Sochaux	2015–16	Ligue 2	34	11	6	1	2	0	—		—		42	12
Sochaux	Total		72	25	7	1	3	0	—		—		82	26
Angers	2016–17	Ligue 1	31	7	2	1	0	0	—		—		33	8
Angers	2017–18	Ligue 1	37	17	1	0	1	0	—		—		39	17
Angers	Total		68	24	3	1	1	0	—		—		72	25
Villarreal	2018–19	La Liga	34	10	2	5	—		7 (Note: Appearances in UEFA Europa League)	3	—		43	18
Villarreal	2019–20	La Liga	18	6	1	0	—		—		—		19	6
Villarreal	Total		52	16	3	5	—		7	3	—		62	24
Lyon (loan)	2019–20	Ligue 1	8	2	3	0	1	0	4 (Note: Appearances in UEFA Champions League)	0	—		16	2
Lyon	2020–21	Ligue 1	35	14	4	0	—		—		—		39	14
Lyon	2021–22	Ligue 1	30	12	0	0	—		10	6	—		40	18
Lyon	2022–23	Ligue 1	19	4	0	0	—		—		—		19	4
Lyon	Total		92	32	7	0	1	0	14	6	—		114	38
Rennes (loan)	2022–23	Ligue 1	17	3	—		—		2	2	—		19	5
Abha	2023–24	Saudi Pro League	14	5	3	2	—		—		—		17	7
Al-Ettifaq	2023–24	Saudi Pro League	15	6	—		—		—		—		15	6
Al-Ettifaq	2024–25	Saudi Pro League	24	1	2	2	—		—		7 (Note: Appearances in AGCFF Gulf Club Champions League)	4	33	7
Al-Ettifaq	Total		39	7	2	2	—		—		7	4	48	13
Al-Fateh	2025–26	Saudi Pro League	7	0	3	1	—		—		—		10	1
Career total			429	133	29	12	5	0	23	11	7	4	493	160

=== International ===
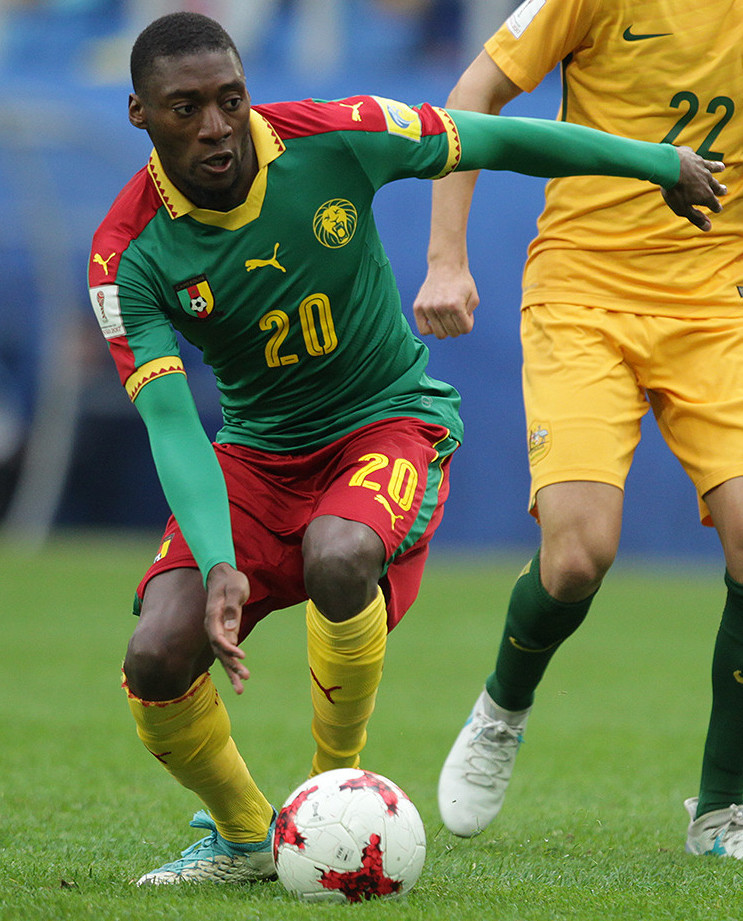
Toko Ekambi at the 2017 FIFA Confederations Cup

As of match played 27 January 2024

Appearances and goals by national team and year
National team	Year	Apps	Goals
Cameroon	2015	3	0
Cameroon	2016	4	1
Cameroon	2017	10	1
Cameroon	2018	5	0
Cameroon	2019	8	1
Cameroon	2020	3	0
Cameroon	2021	7	2
Cameroon	2022	14	7
Cameroon	2023	4	1
Cameroon	2024	3	1
Total		61	14

As of match played 23 January 2024
Scores and results list Cameroon's goal tally first, score column indicates score after each Toko Ekambi goal.

List of international goals scored by Karl Toko Ekambi
No.	Date	Venue	Opponent	Score	Result	Competition
1	3 September 2016	Limbe Stadium, Limbe, Cameroon	Gambia	2–0	2–0	2017 Africa Cup of Nations qualification
2	28 March 2017	Edmond Machtens Stadium, Brussels, Belgium	Guinea	1–1	1–2	Friendly
3	14 June 2019	Saoud bin Abdulrahman Stadium, Al Wakrah, Qatar	Mali	1–1	1–1	Friendly
4	8 October 2021	Japoma Stadium, Douala, Cameroon	Mozambique	3–0	3–1	2022 FIFA World Cup qualification
5	16 November 2021	Japoma Stadium, Douala, Cameroon	Ivory Coast	1–0	1–0	2022 FIFA World Cup qualification
6	13 January 2022	Olembe Stadium, Yaoundé, Cameroon	Ethiopia	1–1	4–1	2021 Africa Cup of Nations
7	13 January 2022	Olembe Stadium, Yaoundé, Cameroon	Ethiopia	4–1	4–1	2021 Africa Cup of Nations
8	24 January 2022	Olembe Stadium, Yaoundé, Cameroon	Comoros	1–0	2–1	2021 Africa Cup of Nations
9	29 January 2022	Japoma Stadium, Douala, Cameroon	Gambia	1–0	2–0	2021 Africa Cup of Nations
10	29 January 2022	Japoma Stadium, Douala, Cameroon	Gambia	2–0	2–0	2021 Africa Cup of Nations
11	29 March 2022	Mustapha Tchaker Stadium, Blida, Algeria	Algeria	2–1	2–1 (a.e.t.)	2022 FIFA World Cup qualification
12	9 June 2022	National Stadium, Dar es Salaam, Tanzania	Burundi	1–0	1–0	2023 Africa Cup of Nations qualification
13	10 June 2023	Snapdragon Stadium, San Diego, United States	Mexico	2–1	2–2	Friendly
14	23 January 2024	Stade de la Paix, Bouaké, Ivory Coast	Gambia	1–0	3–2	2023 Africa Cup of Nations

== Honours ==
Lyon

- Coupe de la Ligue runner-up: 2019–20

Cameroon

- Africa Cup of Nations: 2017; third place: 2021

Individual

- Ligue 2 Team of the Year: 2014–15
- Prix Marc-Vivien Foé: 2018
- La Liga Player of the Month: October 2019
