= Ali Al-Zubaidi (footballer, born 1993) =

Saudi Arabian footballer

Personal information
- Full name: Ali Faraj Al-Zubaidi
- Date of birth: 4 January 1993 (age 33)
- Place of birth: Jeddah, Saudi Arabia
- Height: 1.77 m (5 ft 9 1/2 in)
- Position: Right back

Team information
- Current team: Al-Ula
- Number: 2

Senior career*
| Years | Team | Apps | (Gls) |
| 2012–2015 | Al-Ettifaq | 33 | (5) |
| 2013–2014 | → Al-Ahli (loan) | 22 | (0) |
| 2015–2020 | Al-Ahli | 16 | (1) |
| 2018 | → Al-Raed (loan) | 0 | (0) |
| 2019–2020 | → Al-Wehda (loan) | 0 | (0) |
| 2020–2021 | Al-Wehda | 9 | (0) |
| 2021–2022 | Al-Fayha | 2 | (0) |
| 2022–2024 | Al-Fateh | 44 | (1) |
| 2024– | Al-Ula | | |

International career
| 2011 | Saudi Arabia U20 | 3 | (0) |
| 2016 | Saudi Arabia U23 | 3 | (0) |
| 2012–2014 | Saudi Arabia | 5 | (0) |
- * Club domestic league appearances and goals as of 16 May 2023

Ali Faraj Al-Zubaidi (Arabic: علي فرج الزبيدي; born 4 January 1993) is a Saudi international footballer who plays as a right back for Al-Ula.

== Club career ==
Al-Zubaidi joined Al-Ettifaq and established himself in the starting position.

On 2 August 2024, Al-Zubaidi joined Second Division side Al-Ula.

== International career ==
Al-Zubaidi made his competitive international debut against Iran

== Honours ==
Al-Ahli

- Saudi Professional League: 2015–16
- King Cup: 2016
- Saudi Super Cup: 2016
