= Jordan Harrison (soccer) =

Australian soccer player

Personal information
- Full name: Jordan Harrison
- Date of birth: 9 September 2002 (age 24)
- Place of birth: Riyadh, Saudi Arabia
- Height: 1.89 m (6 ft 2 in)
- Position: Defensive midfielder

Youth career
- Brisbane Lions
- Rochedale Rovers
- 2011–2012: Manchester City
- 2013–2019: Chelsea
- 2019–2022: Watford

Senior career*
Years	Team	Apps	(Gls)
2023–2024	Al Fateh	0	(0)
- * Club domestic league appearances and goals as of 9 August 2023

Jordan Harrison (born 9 September 2002) is a professional soccer player who plays as a defensive midfielder. Born in Saudi Arabia, he has represented Australia at youth level.

== Early life ==
Born in Riyadh, Harrison grew up and started his soccer career in Brisbane, Australia. At the age of nine, he moved to live in England and spent his youth career at the youth academies of Chelsea, Manchester City and Watford.

== Club career ==
=== Al Fateh ===
Harrison had his scholarship extended to a third year by Watford at the end of the 2020–21 season, and was released at the end of the 2021–22 season. He was signed by the Saudi Pro League club Al Fateh on 29 July 2023. He is counted and registered as a homegrown player due to his birth in Riyadh, Saudi Arabia.

== International career ==
Harrison was part of the Australian under-23 team squad at the 2023 Maurice Revello Tournament in Paris, France. The team managed to reach third place, but he did not manage to appear on the field, and was only on the bench for a few matches.

He is also eligible to represent Scotland, England and South Africa due to his heritage, and Saudi Arabia due to being born there.

== Career statistics ==
=== Club ===
As of 3 September 2023

Appearances and goals by club, season and competition
Club	Season	League		King Cup		Asia		Other		Total	
Club	Season	Apps	Goals	Apps	Goals	Apps	Goals	Apps	Goals	Apps	Goals
Al-Fateh	2023–24	0	0	0	0	—		—		0	0
Al-Fateh	Total	0	0	0	0	0	0	0	0	0	0
Career totals		0	0	0	0	0	0	0	0	0	0
