= Ali Al-Masoud =

Saudi Arabian footballer

Personal information
- Date of birth: January 3, 2004 (age 22)
- Place of birth: Saudi Arabia
- Position: Forward

Team information
- Current team: Al-Fateh
- Number: 29

Youth career
- –2022: Al-Fateh

Senior career*
Years	Team	Apps	(Gls)
2022–	Al-Fateh	33	(2)

International career
2019–2021	Saudi Arabia U17		
2022–	Saudi Arabia U20		
- * Club domestic league appearances and goals as of 6 March 2026

Ali Al-Masoud (Arabic: علي المسعود; born 3 January 2004) is a Saudi Arabian professional footballer who plays as a forward for Saudi Pro League club Al-Fateh.

== Career ==
Al-Masoud started his career at the youth teams of Al-Fateh. He was called up to the first team after a number of first-team players tested positive for COVID-19. Al-Masoud made his first-team debut on 1 January 2022, coming off the bench against Al-Nassr.
