= Saeed Baattiah =

Saudi Arabian footballer

Personal information
- Full name: Saeed Khalid Saeed Baattiah
- Date of birth: 23 September 2000 (age 26)
- Place of birth: Jeddah, Saudi Arabia
- Height: 1.72 m (5 ft 8 in)
- Position: Right-back

Team information
- Current team: Al-Ahli
- Number: 15

Youth career
- –2020: Al-Ahli

Senior career*
Years	Team	Apps	(Gls)
2021	Al-Ansar	11	(0)
2021–2023	Jeddah	61	(4)
2023–2026	Al-Fateh	88	(1)
2026–	Al-Ahli	6	(0)

International career
2022	Saudi Arabia U-23		
- * Club domestic league appearances and goals as of 20 November 2026

Saeed Baattiah (Arabic: سعيد باعطيه; born 23 September 2000) is a Saudi Arabian professional footballer who plays as a right-back for Saudi Pro League side Al-Ahli.

== Career ==
Baattiah started his career at the youth team of hometown club Al-Ahli before leaving in June 2020. On 18 January 2021, Baattiah joined Second Division side Al-Ansar. On 7 July 2021, Baattiah joined First Division side Jeddah. On 24 November 2021, Baattiah scored his first goal for the club in the 1–0 win against Al-Orobah. On 17 May 2022, Baattiah once again scored the winner in a crucial 1–0 win against Al-Kholood. On 20 August 2022, Baattiah renewed his contract with Jeddah for another year. On 4 January 2023, Baattiah signed a pre-contract agreement with Pro League side Al-Fateh. He officially joined on 1 July 2023 on a four-year contract. On 13 August 2023, Baattiah made his Pro League debut for Al-Fateh as a substitute in the 1–1 draw against Al-Taawoun. On 2 September 2023, Baattiah made his first start for the club in the 5–1 win against former club Al-Ahli.
