= Ziyad Al-Jari =

Saudi Arabian footballer

Personal information
- Full name: Ziyad Maher Al-Jari
- Date of birth: November 15, 2001 (age 24)
- Place of birth: Al-Hasa, Saudi Arabia
- Height: 1.82 m (6 ft 0 in)
- Position: Centre back

Team information
- Current team: Al-Fateh
- Number: 4

Youth career
- Al-Fateh

Senior career*
Years	Team	Apps	(Gls)
2020–	Al-Fateh	22	(0)
2024	→ Al-Orobah (loan)	3	(0)

International career
2023–	Saudi Arabia U23		
- * Club domestic league appearances and goals as of 27 May 2024

Ziyad Al-Jari (Arabic: زياد الجري; born 15 November 2001) is a Saudi Arabian professional footballer who plays as a centre back for Al-Fateh.

== Career ==
Al-Jari began his career at the youth team of Al-Fateh. On 19 August 2020, he was called up to the bench for the first time. On 7 July 2021, Al-Jari signed his first professional contract with the club. On 23 October 2021, Al-Jari made his debut for Al-Fateh starting in the 3–1 loss against Abha. On 31 January 2024, Al-Jari joined Al-Orobah on a six-month loan.
