= 2021–22 Al-Fateh SC season =

Al-Fateh
2021–22 season
- President: Saad Al-Afaliq
- Manager: Yannick Ferrera (until 9 January); Georgios Donis (from 16 January)
- Stadium: Prince Abdullah bin Jalawi Stadium
- SPL: 8th
- King Cup: Round of 16 (knocked out by Al-Ittihad)
- Top goalscorer: League: Firas Al-Buraikan (11 goals); All: Firas Al-Buraikan (11 goals)
- Highest home attendance: 17,459 (vs. Al-Hilal, 23 June 2022)
- Lowest home attendance: 1,392 (vs. Al-Fayha, 21 August 2021)
- Average home league attendance: 7,975
- All statistics correct as of 27 June 2022.

The 2021–22 season was Al-Fateh's 13th consecutive season in the Pro League and their 64th year in existence. The club participated in the Pro League and the King Cup.

The season covered the period from 1 July 2021 to 30 June 2022.

== Players ==
=== Squad information ===
As of 1 September 2021

Note: Flags indicate national team as defined under FIFA eligibility rules; some limited exceptions apply. Players may hold more than one non-FIFA nationality.

No.	Pos.	Nation	Player
1	GK	KSA	Basil Al-Bahrani
2	DF	KSA	Nawaf Boushal
3	DF	KSA	Ziyad Al-Jari
4	DF	KSA	Saleh Al-Nashmi
5	DF	KSA	Fahad Al-Harbi
6	MF	KSA	Abbas Al-Hassan
7	MF	KSA	Hassan Al-Habib
8	FW	CRO	Ivan Santini
10	MF	PER	Christian Cueva
11	MF	MAR	Mourad Batna
12	MF	KSA	Majed Kanabah
14	MF	KSA	Mohammed Al-Fuhaid (captain)
15	MF	KSA	Hassan Al-Mohammed
16	MF	KSA	Munther Al-Nakhli
17	MF	MAR	Marwane Saâdane

No.	Pos.	Nation	Player
18	MF	KSA	Mohammed Al-Saeed
19	FW	KSA	Firas Al-Buraikan
22	GK	KSA	Waleed Al-Enezi (on loan from Al-Nassr)
23	DF	KSA	Abdullah Al-Yousef
24	DF	KSA	Ammar Al-Daheem
25	DF	KSA	Tawfiq Buhimed (vice-captain)
26	MF	KSA	Ali Al-Zaqaan
28	MF	ALG	Sofiane Bendebka
33	GK	KSA	Ali Al-Shohaib
35	GK	UKR	Maksym Koval
37	MF	KSA	Ali Al-Jassem
43	FW	KSA	Othman Al-Othman
77	MF	EGY	Ahmed El Geaidy
87	DF	KSA	Qassem Lajami
88	MF	NOR	Gustav Wikheim

=== Out on loan ===
Note: Flags indicate national team as defined under FIFA eligibility rules; some limited exceptions apply. Players may hold more than one non-FIFA nationality.

No.	Pos.	Nation	Player
20	MF	KSA	Murtadha Al-Khodrawi (at Hajer until 30 June 2022)

== Transfers and loans ==
=== Transfers in ===
Entry date	Position	No.	Player	From club	Fee	Ref.
30 June 2021	MF	16	(Saudi Arabia) Munther Al-Nakhli	(Saudi Arabia) Al-Fayha	End of loan	
1 July 2021	MF	77	(Egypt) Ahmed El Geaidy	(Saudi Arabia) Al-Bukiryah	Free	
4 July 2021	MF	15	(Saudi Arabia) Hassan Al-Mohammed	(Saudi Arabia) Hajer	Undisclosed	
8 July 2021	FW	19	(Saudi Arabia) Firas al-Buraikan	(Saudi Arabia) Al-Nassr	$1,866,000	
10 August 2021	FW	8	(Croatia) Ivan Santini	(Croatia) Osijek	Free	
3 January 2022	MF	66	(Brazil) Petros	(Saudi Arabia) Al-Nassr	Free	
15 January 2022	MF	–	(Saudi Arabia) Loay Al-Johani	(Saudi Arabia) Ohod	Free	
17 January 2022	MF	9	(Saudi Arabia) Ayman Al-Khulaif	(Saudi Arabia) Al-Wehda	$225,000	
30 January 2022	DF	27	(Saudi Arabia) Ali Al-Zubaidi	(Saudi Arabia) Al-Fayha	Free	

=== Loans in ===
Start date	End date	Position	No.	Player	From club	Fee	Ref.
30 August 2021	End of season	GK	22	(Saudi Arabia) Waleed Al-Enezi	(Saudi Arabia) Al-Nassr	None	
30 January 2022	End of season	DF	20	(Saudi Arabia) Khalifah Al-Dawsari	(Saudi Arabia) Al-Hilal	None	

=== Transfers out ===
Exit date	Position	No.	Player	To club	Fee	Ref.
1 July 2021	FW	19	(Saudi Arabia) Mohammed Majrashi	(Saudi Arabia) Al-Ahli	Free	
3 July 2021	DF	3	(Saudi Arabia) Mohammad Naji	(Saudi Arabia) Al-Batin	Undisclosed	
22 July 2021	FW	22	(Algeria) Hillal Soudani	(Saudi Arabia) Damac	Free	
29 July 2021	FW	99	(Saudi Arabia) Abdullah Al-Bladi	(Saudi Arabia) Al-Nahda	Free	
6 August 2021	MF	–	(Saudi Arabia) Osama Al-Mubaireek	(Poland) Legia Warsaw	Free	
11 August 2021	FW	9	(Suriname) Mitchell te Vrede	(Saudi Arabia) Abha	Free	
7 September 2021	GK	34	(Saudi Arabia) Mohammed Al-Burayh	(Saudi Arabia) Al-Diriyah	Free	
13 September 2021	MF	16	(Sudan) Mohammed Al-Dhaw	(Saudi Arabia) Al-Qaisumah	Free	
7 January 2022	MF	88	(Norway) Gustav Wikheim		Released	
30 January 2022	DF	4	(Saudi Arabia) Saleh Al-Nashmi	(Saudi Arabia) Al-Qadsiah	Undisclosed	
30 January 2022	MF	26	(Saudi Arabia) Ali Al-Zaqaan	(Saudi Arabia) Al-Fayha	Undisclosed	

=== Loans out ===
Start date	End date	Position	No.	Player	To club	Fee	Ref.
27 August 2021	End of season	MF	20	(Saudi Arabia) Murtadha Al-Khedhrawi	(Saudi Arabia) Hajer	None	
30 January 2022	End of season	MF	–	(Saudi Arabia) Loay Al-Johani	(Saudi Arabia) Najran	None	

== Pre-season ==
15 July 2021 Friendly	Al-Fateh (Saudi Arabia)	4–0	(Austria) SV Wörgl	Wörgl, Austria
18:00 CEST	Al-Harbi 44'; Wikheim 54'; Al-Buraikan 75'; Al-Geaidy 85'	Report		Stadium: Sportzentrum Wörgl

19 July 2021 Friendly	Al-Fateh (Saudi Arabia)	2–2	(Russia) Akhmat Grozny	Salzburg, Austria
16:00 CEST	Batna 5'; Al-Zaqaan 74'	Report	Kharin 22'; Konovalov 85'	Stadium: Alex Hausen Stadium

23 July 2021 Friendly	Al-Fateh (Saudi Arabia)	1–3	(Hungary) Gyirmót	Salzburg, Austria
CEST	Batna 39'	Report	Varga 35'; Herjeczki 65'; Csonka 70'	Stadium: Alex Hausen Stadium

27 July 2021 Friendly	Al-Fateh (Saudi Arabia)	0–0	(Italy) Torino	Brixen, Italy
17:00 CEST		Report		Stadium: Stadio di Bressanone

== Competitions ==
=== Overview ===
Competition	Record							
Competition	G	W	D	L	GF	GA	GD	Win %
Pro League	30	9	8	13	45	41	+4	30.00
King Cup	1	0	0	1	2	3	−1	0.00
Total	31	9	8	14	47	44	+3	29.03

Updated to match played 27 June 2022
Source: Competitions

=== Pro League ===
==== League table ====
Pos	Team	Pld	W	D	L	GF	GA	GD	Pts	Qualification or relegation
6	Al-Tai	30	11	4	15	33	45	−12	37	
7	Al-Raed	30	10	6	14	35	45	−10	36	
8	Al-Fateh	30	9	8	13	45	41	+4	35 (Note: Head-to-head points: Al-Fateh 5, Abha 5, Al-Fayha 4. Head-to-head goal difference: Al-Fateh +1, Abha –1.)	
9	Abha	30	9	8	13	27	43	−16	35	
10	Al-Fayha	30	8	11	11	21	24	−3	35	Qualification for AFC Champions League group stage (Note: Al-Fayha qualified for the AFC Champions League play-off round as 2021–22 King Cup winners.)

Source: spl.com
Rules for classification: 1) Points; 2) Head-to-head points; 3) Head-to-head goal difference; 4) Total goal difference; 5) Total goals scored; 6) Fair-play points (Note: Head-to-head record is used only after all the matches between the teams in question have been played).

==== Results summary ====
Overall								Home						Away					
Pld	W	D	L	GF	GA	GD	Pts	W	D	L	GF	GA	GD	W	D	L	GF	GA	GD
30	9	8	13	45	41	+4	35	5	3	7	31	25	+6	4	5	6	14	16	−2

Last updated: 27 June 2022.
Source: spl.com.sa

==== Results by round ====
Round	1	2	3	4	5	6	7	8	9	10	11	12	13	14	15	16	17	18	19	20	21	22	23	24	25	26	27	28	29	30
Ground	A	H	H	A	A	H	A	H	A	H	A	A	H	A	H	H	A	A	H	H	A	H	A	H	A	H	H	A	H	A
Result	L	D	W	W	D	L	D	W	L	W	L	L	D	W	L	L	D	D	L	L	W	W	D	W	L	D	L	W	L	L
Position	14	15	7	2	4	7	7	5	7	8	10	12	12	8	11	12	12	12	14	15	12	7	8	6	7	8	8	6	6	8

Updated to match(es) played on 27 June 2022. Source: spl.com.sa
A = Away; H = Home; W = Win; D = Draw; L = Loss

==== Matches ====
All times are local, AST (UTC+3).

Win Draw Loss Postponed

12 August 2021 1	Al-Raed	1–0	Al-Fateh	Buraidah
19:20	Al-Ghamdi 45+3'; Salem (yellow card) 46'; Majrashi (yellow card) 50'; Al-Rehaili (yellow card) 88'	Report	Al-Yousef (yellow card) 90+2'	Stadium: King Abdullah Sport City Stadium; Attendance: 668; Referee: Majed Al-Shamrani

21 August 2021 2	Al-Fateh	1–1	Al-Fayha	Al-Hasa
18:50	Bendebka 23'; Batna (yellow card) 54'; Buhimed (yellow card) 60'; Saâdane (yellow card) 88'	Report	Lopes 26'; Bamsaud (yellow card) 38'; Stojković (yellow card) 90+1'	Stadium: Prince Abdullah bin Jalawi Stadium; Attendance: 1,392; Referee: Abdullah Al-Harbi

26 August 2021 3	Al-Fateh	2–0	Al-Shabab	Al-Hasa
18:45	Al-Fuhaid (yellow card) 16'; Al-Buraikan 25'; Saâdane (yellow card) 52'; Boushal 87'	Report	Banega (red card) 21'; Majrashi (yellow card) 74' (yellow-red card) 84'; Al-Qahtani (yellow card) 83'; Al-Harbi (yellow card) 84'; Ighalo (yellow card) 84'	Stadium: Prince Abdullah bin Jalawi Stadium; Attendance: 2,644; Referee: Turki Al-Khudhayr

12 September 2021 4	Al-Batin	0–2	Al-Fateh	Hafar al-Batin
18:40	Acquah (yellow card) 18'; Naji (yellow card) 30'; Al-Qarni (yellow card) 45+3'; Al-Rubaie (yellow card) 56'	Report	Wikheim 21', 34'; Al-Fuhaid (yellow card) 31'; Buhimed (yellow card) 77'	Stadium: Al-Batin Club Stadium; Attendance: 2,645; Referee: Shukri Al-Hanfoush

17 September 2021 5	Al-Ahli	1–1	Al-Fateh	Jeddah
20:30	Alioski 15' (pen.), (yellow card) 45+1'	Report	Koval (yellow card) 16'; Al-Buraikan 20'; Saâdane (yellow card) 58'	Stadium: King Abdullah Sports City; Attendance: 9,511; Referee: Turki Al-Khudhayr

25 September 2021 6	Al-Fateh	0–1	Al-Hazem	Al-Hasa
18:15		Report	Abdullah S. (yellow card) 40'; Moha 52'	Stadium: Prince Abdullah bin Jalawi Stadium; Attendance: 7,810; Referee: Mohammed Al-Harbi

30 September 2021 7	Al-Ettifaq	0–0	Al-Fateh	Khobar
20:20		Report	Al-Fuhaid (yellow card) 29'; Lajami (yellow card) 66'; Boushal (yellow card) 90+4'	Stadium: Prince Saud bin Jalawi Stadium; Attendance: 4,377; Referee: Abdullah Al-Shehri

17 October 2021 8	Al-Fateh	3–0	Al-Taawoun	Al-Hasa
17:50	Wikheim 27'; Santini 35', 45+4' (pen.), (yellow card) 67'; Saâdane (yellow card) 65'	Report	Tawamba (yellow card) 42'; Al-Nabit (yellow card) 71'	Stadium: Prince Abdullah bin Jalawi Stadium; Attendance: 3,211; Referee: Khaled Salwi

23 October 2021 9	Abha	3–1	Al-Fateh	Abha
18:20	te Vrede 3'; Al-Jumayah 7'; Al-Kunaydiri (yellow card) 68'; Bguir 75', (yellow card) 76'	Report	Santini (yellow card) 14'; Cueva 42' (pen.)	Stadium: Prince Sultan bin Abdul Aziz Stadium; Attendance: 1,238; Referee: Mohammed Al-Beredi

4 November 2021 11	Al-Ittihad	3–0	Al-Fateh	Jeddah
19:45	Romarinho 35' (pen.), 70'; Coronado 37'; Al-Sahafi (red card) 77'	Report	Saâdane (yellow card) 26' (yellow-red card) 49'; Kanabah (yellow card) 45+3'	Stadium: King Abdullah Sports City; Attendance: 41,395; Referee: Ahmed Al-Rumaikhani

20 November 2021 12	Al-Tai	1–0	Al-Fateh	Ha'il
15:20	Marcelo (yellow card) 37'; Al-Harabi (yellow card) 72'; Al-Qahtani (yellow card) 87'; Sayoud 90+4'; Al-Sulaiman (yellow card) 90+5'	Report	Al-Saeed (yellow card) 48'; Al-Yousef (yellow card) 79'; Wikheim (yellow card) 87'	Stadium: Prince Abdul Aziz bin Musa'ed Stadium; Attendance: Khaled Al-Teris; Referee: 4,790

25 November 2021 13	Al-Fateh	5–5	Damac	Al-Hasa
17:30	Cueva 3', 75' (pen.); Al-Zaqaan 19', (yellow card) 38'; Santini 69'; Al-Buraikan 76'; Lajami (yellow card) 87'	Report	Augusto (yellow card) 6', (goal) 45+4'; Soudani 11', 16'; Vittor (yellow card) 38'; Zelaya (yellow card) 40', (goal) 79'; Caktaš 63'; Zeghba (yellow card) 90+4'	Stadium: Prince Abdullah bin Jalawi Stadium; Attendance: 6,260; Referee: Shukri Al-Hanfoush

25 December 2021 14	Al-Hilal	2–3	Al-Fateh	Riyadh
17:50	Carrillo 12'; Gomis 75'	Report	Batna 16', 87' (pen.); Al-Zaqaan (yellow card) 53'; Al-Hassan (yellow card) 57'; Al-Daheem (yellow card) 68'; Bendebka 71'; Al-Fuhaid (yellow card) 90+1'	Stadium: Prince Faisal bin Fahd Stadium; Attendance: 6,091; Referee: Derlis Fabián López (Paraguay)

1 January 2022 15	Al-Fateh	0–1	Al-Nassr	Al-Hasa
17:40	Saâdane (red card) 42'; Al-Hassan (yellow card) 50'; Al-Zaqaan (yellow card) 72'	Report	Yahya (yellow card) 24'; Anselmo (yellow card) 64'; Talisca 75'	Stadium: Prince Abdullah bin Jalawi Stadium; Attendance: 5,964; Referee: Ovidiu Hațegan (Romania)

8 January 2022 16	Al-Fateh	2–3	Al-Raed	Al-Hasa
17:45	Al-Buraikan (yellow card) 45+2'; Santini 48'; Al-Daheem (yellow card) 57' (yellow-red card) 75'; Al-Zaqaan (yellow card) 76'; Cueva (yellow card) 83', (goal) 90+6'	Report	El Berkaoui 35' (pen.), 88'; René (yellow card) 64'; Fouzair 77' (pen.); Al-Harbi (yellow card) 79'	Stadium: Prince Abdullah bin Jalawi Stadium; Attendance: 7,198; Referee: István Kovács (Romania)

13 January 2022 17	Al-Fayha	0–0	Al-Fateh	Al Majma'ah
15:30		Report	Saâdane (yellow card) 30'; Al-Jari (yellow card) 55'; Al-Bahrani (yellow card) 87'	Stadium: Al Majma'ah Sports City; Attendance: 3,350; Referee: Khaled Al-Teris

20 January 2022 18	Al-Shabab	1–1	Al-Fateh	Riyadh
18:10	N'Diaye (yellow card) 12'; Ighalo 66', (yellow card) 78'; Majrashi (yellow card) 88'	Report	Al-Buraikan (yellow card) 26'; Cueva (yellow card) 31'; Boushal (yellow card) 70'; Batna 78', (yellow card) 79'	Stadium: Prince Faisal bin Fahd Stadium; Attendance: 4,747; Referee: Sami Al-Jires

6 February 2022 19	Al-Fateh	2–3	Al-Batin	Al-Hasa
18:05	Al-Buraikan 22'; Al-Fuhaid (yellow card) 32'; Batna 34', (yellow card) 87'	Report	El Jebli 4'; Abreu 6'; M. Al-Qarni (yellow card) 30'; Rayhi 45+1'; Al-Hurayji (yellow card) 50' (yellow-red card) 80'; Campaña (yellow card) 86'	Stadium: Prince Abdullah bin Jalawi Stadium; Attendance: 5,241; Referee: Majed Al-Shamrani

11 February 2022 20	Al-Fateh	0–1	Al-Ahli	Al-Hasa
18:10	Batna (yellow card) 43'; Petros (yellow card) 43'; Al-Daheem (red card) 66'; Saâdane (yellow card) 66'; Cueva (red card) 71'	Report	Eduardo (yellow card) 34', (goal) 85'; Al-Hamad (yellow card) 50'	Stadium: Prince Abdullah bin Jalawi Stadium; Attendance: 6,245; Referee: Mohammed Al-Harbi

18 February 2022 21	Al-Hazem	0–1	Al-Fateh	Ar Rass
16:00	Abdullah S. (red card) 8'	Report	Boushal (red card) 3'; Al-Zubaidi (yellow card) 21'; Al-Yousef (yellow card) 61'; Al-Buraikan 72'; Petros (yellow card) 81'; Koval (yellow card) 88'	Stadium: Al-Hazem Club Stadium; Attendance: 1,924; Referee: Khaled Al-Teris

22 February 2022 10	Al-Fateh	4–1	Al-Faisaly	Al-Hasa
18:15	Bendebka 24'; Cueva 42' (pen.), 45'; Saâdane 55'	Report	Al-Qumayzi (yellow card) 40'; Al-Dawsari (yellow card) 83'; Tavares 84'	Stadium: Prince Abdullah bin Jalawi Stadium; Attendance: 8,279; Referee: Sultan Al-Harbi

27 February 2022 22	Al-Fateh	4–0	Al-Ettifaq	Al-Hasa
18:15	Cueva 10', 33'; Bendebka 37'; Lajami (yellow card) 50'; Al-Fuhaid (yellow card) 53'; Batna 85' (pen.)	Report		Stadium: Prince Abdullah bin Jalawi Stadium; Attendance: 8,374; Referee: Mohammed Al-Hoaish

4 March 2022 23	Al-Taawoun	1–1	Al-Fateh	Buraidah
18:45	Al-Sobhi (yellow card) 19' (yellow-red card) 45+4'; Fathi 27'; Al-Bakr (yellow card) 34'; Al-Nabit (yellow card) 38'; El Mahdioui (yellow card) 45'; Zé Luís (red card) 49'; Abdullah (yellow card) 85'	Report	Batna (yellow card) 29' (yellow-red card) 70'; Al-Buraikan 36'; Al-Fuhaid (yellow card) 42'; Al-Daheem (yellow card) 59'	Stadium: King Abdullah Sport City Stadium; Attendance: 6,682; Referee: Piero Maza (Chile)

10 March 2022 24	Al-Fateh	3–0	Abha	Al-Hasa
18:25	Bendebka 67'; Santini 73', 79', (yellow card) 83'	Report	Al Hamsal (yellow card) 33'; Ifa (red card) 63'; Amr (yellow card) 67' (yellow-red card) 90+7'; Bguir (yellow card) 77'	Stadium: Prince Abdullah bin Jalawi Stadium; Attendance: 11,382; Referee: Mohammed Al-Esmaiel

17 March 2022 25	Al-Faisaly	1–0	Al-Fateh	Al Majma'ah
18:45	Ismael (yellow card) 8'; Al-Qumayzi (yellow card) 28'; Faik (yellow card) 40'; Boyle 59'; Al-Dawsari (yellow card) 66'; Qassem (yellow card) 74'	Report	Santini (yellow card) 33'; Buhimed (yellow card) 39'; Boushal (yellow card) 82'	Stadium: Al Majma'ah Sports City; Attendance: 6,315; Referee: Sami Al-Jires

6 May 2022 26	Al-Fateh	4–4	Al-Ittihad	Al-Hasa
18:50	Petros 9'; Al-Buraikan 45+3', 83'; Bendebka 60'; Batna (yellow card) 76'	Report	Romarinho 17', 77'; Coronado 20'; Hawsawi (yellow card) 29'; Hamdallah 42'; Al-Shamrani (yellow card) 90+7'	Stadium: Prince Abdullah bin Jalawi Stadium; Attendance: 16,754; Referee: Sami Al-Jires

22 May 2022 27	Al-Fateh	1–2	Al-Tai	Al-Hasa
19:00	Al-Daheem (yellow card) 28'; Batna (yellow card) 62'; Al-Khulaif 70'	Report	Al-Jubairi (yellow card) 16'; Ali 24'; Fai (yellow card) 30'; Bajandouh (yellow card) 64'; Dener 79'; Al-Sultan (yellow card) 90'; Al-Aqidi (yellow card) 90+2'	Stadium: Prince Abdullah bin Jalawi Stadium; Attendance: 11,408; Referee: Sultan Al-Harbi

29 May 2022 28	Damac	0–3	Al-Fateh	Abha
19:15	Zeghba (yellow card) 79'	Report	Al-Buraikan 12', 15', 80' (pen.); Cueva (yellow card) 88'	Stadium: Prince Sultan bin Abdul Aziz Stadium; Attendance: 1,534; Referee: Sami Al-Jires

23 June 2022 29	Al-Fateh	0–3	Al-Hilal	Al-Hasa
21:00	Al-Khulaif (yellow card) 4'; Cueva (yellow card) 64'; Al-Daheem (yellow card) 68'; Petros (yellow card) 71'	Report	S. Al-Dawsari 10', 39'; Cuéllar (yellow card) 25' (yellow-red card) 45'; Hyun-soo (yellow card) 38'; Marega 80'; Al-Bulaihi (yellow card) 82'	Stadium: Prince Abdullah bin Jalawi Stadium; Attendance: 17,459; Referee: Roberto Tobar (Chile)

27 June 2022 30	Al-Nassr	2–1	Al-Fateh	Riyadh
21:00	Martínez 13'; Anselmo (yellow card) 59'; Talisca (red card) 73'; Masharipov 90+5' (pen.)	Report	Al-Fuhaid (yellow card) 30'; Al-Khulaif 37', (yellow card) 45'; Al-Jari (yellow card) 56'; Al-Dawsari (yellow card) 90+3'	Stadium: Mrsool Park; Attendance: 2,364; Referee: Sami Al-Jires

=== King Cup ===
All times are local, AST (UTC+3).

20 December 2021 Round of 16	Al-Fateh	2–3	Al-Ittihad	Al-Hasa
17:35	Al-Daheem (yellow card) 9'; Batna 17', 22', (yellow card) 90+7'; Lajami (yellow card) 39'; Santini (yellow card) 45+3'; Cueva (yellow card) 56' (yellow-red card) 90+4'; Kanabah (yellow card) 78'; Al-Fuhaid (yellow card) 90+4'	Report	Al-Aboud (yellow card) 13'; Romarinho 37' (pen.), 75'; Al-Shamrani (yellow card) 89'; Al-Sahafi (yellow card) 90+2'; Bruno Henrique 90+2'	Stadium: Prince Abdullah bin Jalawi Stadium; Referee: Khaled Salwi

== Statistics ==
=== Appearances ===
Last updated on 27 June 2022.

No.	Pos	Nat	Player	Total		Pro League		King Cup	
No.	Pos	Nat	Player	Apps	Goals	Apps	Goals	Apps	Goals
Goalkeepers
1	GK	(Saudi Arabia) KSA	Basil Al-Bahrani	2	0	2	0	0	0
22	GK	(Saudi Arabia) KSA	Waleed Al-Enezi	1	0	0+1	0	0	0
33	GK	(Saudi Arabia) KSA	Ali Al-Shohaib	0	0	0	0	0	0
35	GK	(Ukraine) UKR	Maksym Koval	29	0	28	0	1	0
Defenders
2	DF	(Saudi Arabia) KSA	Nawaf Boushal	27	1	25+2	1	0	0
3	DF	(Saudi Arabia) KSA	Ziyad Al-Jari	4	0	2+2	0	0	0
5	DF	(Saudi Arabia) KSA	Fahad Al-Harbi	2	0	1+1	0	0	0
13	DF	(Saudi Arabia) KSA	Meshaal Al-Hamdan	2	0	1+1	0	0	0
17	DF	(Morocco) MAR	Marwane Saâdane	23	1	23	1	0	0
20	DF	(Saudi Arabia) KSA	Khalifah Al-Dawsari	6	0	2+4	0	0	0
23	DF	(Saudi Arabia) KSA	Abdullah Al-Yousef	19	0	10+8	0	1	0
24	DF	(Saudi Arabia) KSA	Ammar Al-Daheem	12	0	8+3	0	1	0
25	DF	(Saudi Arabia) KSA	Tawfiq Buhimed	25	0	21+4	0	0	0
27	DF	(Saudi Arabia) KSA	Ali Al-Zubaidi	7	0	4+3	0	0	0
55	DF	(Saudi Arabia) KSA	Lafi Al-Marooki	1	0	0+1	0	0	0
83	DF	(Saudi Arabia) KSA	Salem Al-Najdi	1	0	0+1	0	0	0
87	DF	(Saudi Arabia) KSA	Qassem Lajami	21	0	20	0	1	0
Midfielders
6	MF	(Saudi Arabia) KSA	Abbas Al-Hassan	7	0	3+3	0	1	0
7	MF	(Saudi Arabia) KSA	Hassan Al-Habib	6	0	2+4	0	0	0
9	MF	(Saudi Arabia) KSA	Ayman Al-Khulaif	12	2	3+9	2	0	0
10	MF	(Peru) PER	Christian Cueva	25	8	24	8	1	0
11	MF	(Morocco) MAR	Mourad Batna	18	7	16+1	5	1	2
12	MF	(Saudi Arabia) KSA	Majed Kanabah	22	0	11+10	0	0+1	0
14	MF	(Saudi Arabia) KSA	Mohammed Al-Fuhaid	29	0	25+3	0	1	0
15	MF	(Saudi Arabia) KSA	Hassan Al-Mohammed	5	0	2+3	0	0	0
16	MF	(Saudi Arabia) KSA	Munther Al-Nakhli	3	0	1+2	0	0	0
18	MF	(Saudi Arabia) KSA	Mohammed Al-Saeed	15	0	4+11	0	0	0
28	MF	(Algeria) ALG	Sofiane Bendebka	22	6	22	6	0	0
36	MF	(Saudi Arabia) KSA	Abdullah Al-Enezi	2	0	0+2	0	0	0
38	MF	(Saudi Arabia) KSA	Ammar Bo Eissa	1	0	0+1	0	0	0
43	MF	(Saudi Arabia) KSA	Othman Al-Othman	10	0	0+10	0	0	0
45	MF	(Saudi Arabia) KSA	Rakan Al-Qahtani	0	0	0	0	0	0
66	MF	(Brazil) BRA	Petros	15	1	14+1	1	0	0
77	MF	(Egypt) EGY	Ahmed El Geaidy	13	0	3+10	0	0	0
80	MF	(Saudi Arabia) KSA	Faisal Al-Abdulwahed	0	0	0	0	0	0
Forwards
8	FW	(Croatia) CRO	Ivan Santini	24	6	9+14	6	0+1	0
19	FW	(Saudi Arabia) KSA	Firas al-Buraikan	28	11	25+2	11	1	0
29	FW	(Saudi Arabia) KSA	Ali Al-Masoud	1	0	0+1	0	0	0
37	FW	(Saudi Arabia) KSA	Ali Al-Jassem	1	0	1	0	0	0
Player who made an appearance this season but have left the club
4	DF	(Saudi Arabia) KSA	Saleh Al-Nashmi	4	0	0+3	0	1	0
26	MF	(Saudi Arabia) KSA	Ali Al-Zaqaan	15	1	9+5	1	0+1	0
88	MF	(Norway) NOR	Gustav Wikheim	13	3	9+3	3	1	0

=== Goalscorers ===
Rank	No.	Pos	Nat	Name	Pro League	King Cup	Total
1	19	FW	(Saudi Arabia)	Firas al-Buraikan	11	0	11
2	10	MF	(Peru)	Christian Cueva	8	0	8
3	11	MF	(Morocco)	Mourad Batna	5	2	7
4	8	FW	(Croatia)	Ivan Santini	6	0	6
4	28	MF	(Algeria)	Sofiane Bendebka	6	0	6
6	88	MF	(Norway)	Gustav Wikheim	3	0	3
7	9	MF	(Saudi Arabia)	Ayman Al-Khulaif	2	0	2
8	2	DF	(Saudi Arabia)	Nawaf Boushal	1	0	1
8	17	DF	(Morocco)	Marwane Saâdane	1	0	1
8	26	MF	(Saudi Arabia)	Ali Al-Zaqaan	1	0	1
8	66	MF	(Brazil)	Petros	1	0	1
Own goal					0	0	0
Total					45	2	47

Last Updated: 27 June 2022

=== Assists ===
Rank	No.	Pos	Nat	Name	Pro League	King Cup	Total
1	10	MF	(Peru)	Christian Cueva	5	1	6
2	19	FW	(Saudi Arabia)	Firas al-Buraikan	4	0	4
3	8	FW	(Croatia)	Ivan Santini	3	0	3
3	11	MF	(Morocco)	Mourad Batna	3	0	3
3	28	MF	(Algeria)	Sofiane Bendebka	3	0	3
6	2	DF	(Saudi Arabia)	Nawaf Boushal	2	0	2
6	25	DF	(Saudi Arabia)	Tawfiq Buhimed	2	0	2
6	26	MF	(Saudi Arabia)	Ali Al-Zaqaan	2	0	2
9	9	MF	(Saudi Arabia)	Ayman Al-Khulaif	1	0	1
9	77	MF	(Egypt)	Ahmed El Geaidy	1	0	1
Total					26	1	27

Last Updated: 27 June 2022

=== Clean sheets ===
Rank	No.	Pos	Nat	Name	Pro League	King Cup	Total
1	35	GK	(Ukraine)	Maksym Koval	9	0	9
Total					9	0	9

Last Updated: 29 May 2022
