= 2024–25 Al-Fateh SC season =

Al-Fateh
2024–25 season
- President: Mansour Al-Afaliq
- Head coach: Jens Gustafsson (until 4 December); José Gomes (from 12 December)
- Stadium: Al-Fateh Club Stadium
- SPL: 10th
- King Cup: Round of 32 (knocked out by Al-Jabalain)
- Top goalscorer: League: Mourad Batna (13); All: Mourad Batna (13)
- Highest home attendance: 11,278 v Al-Ittihad; 17 April 2025; Saudi Pro League
- Lowest home attendance: 3,097 v Damac; 22 January 2025; Saudi Pro League
- Average home league attendance: 7,684
- All statistics correct as of 26 May 2025.

The 2024–25 season was Al-Fateh's 16th consecutive season in the Pro League and their 67th year in existence. The club participated in the Pro League and the King Cup.

The season covers the period from 1 July 2024 to 30 June 2025.

== Players ==
=== Squad information ===
As of 1 February 2025

Note: Flags indicate national team as defined under FIFA eligibility rules; some limited exceptions apply. Players may hold more than one non-FIFA nationality.

No.	Pos.	Nation	Player
4	DF	KSA	Ziyad Al-Jari
6	MF	KSA	Naif Masoud
7	MF	FRA	Amine Sbaï
9	FW	ARG	Matías Vargas
11	MF	MAR	Mourad Batna
13	DF	KSA	Hussain Qassem
14	MF	KSA	Mohammed Al-Fuhaid (captain)
15	DF	KSA	Saeed Baattiah
17	DF	MAR	Marwane Saâdane
18	MF	KSA	Suhayb Al-Zaid (on loan from Al-Hilal)
21	FW	CPV	Djaniny
24	DF	KSA	Ammar Al-Daheem
26	GK	KSA	Nawaf Al-Aqidi (on loan from Al-Nassr)
28	MF	ALG	Sofiane Bendebka

No.	Pos.	Nation	Player
29	FW	KSA	Ali Al-Masoud
33	MF	COM	Zaydou Youssouf
42	DF	KSA	Ahmed Al-Julaydan
44	DF	POR	Jorge Fernandes
48	GK	KSA	Muhannad Al-Yahya
49	FW	KSA	Saad Al-Shurafa
55	GK	KSA	Waleed Al-Enezi
63	DF	KSA	Montadhar Al-Shaqaq
75	MF	KSA	Mahdi Al-Aboud
82	DF	KSA	Hussain Al-Zarie
88	MF	KSA	Othman Al-Othman
94	MF	KSA	Abdullah Al-Enezi
99	FW	BRA	Matheus Machado

=== Out on loan ===
Note: Flags indicate national team as defined under FIFA eligibility rules; some limited exceptions apply. Players may hold more than one non-FIFA nationality.

No.	Pos.	Nation	Player
1	GK	HUN	Péter Szappanos (at Paks until 30 June 2025)
20	FW	KSA	Abdullah Al-Mogren (at Damac until 30 June 2025)

No.	Pos.	Nation	Player
40	GK	KSA	Sattam Al-Subaie (at Mudhar until 30 June 2025)
80	MF	KSA	Faisal Al-Abdulwahed (at Al-Batin until 30 June 2025)

== Transfers and loans ==
=== Transfers in ===
Entry date	Position	No.	Player	From club	Fee	Ref.
30 June 2024	GK	26	(Saudi Arabia) Mustafa Malayekah	(Saudi Arabia) Al-Shabab	End of loan	
30 June 2024	DF	3	(Saudi Arabia) Ziyad Al-Jari	(Saudi Arabia) Al-Orobah	End of loan	
30 June 2024	MF	30	(Saudi Arabia) Osama Al-Mobairik	(Saudi Arabia) Al-Rawdhah	End of loan	
30 June 2024	MF	38	(Saudi Arabia) Loay Al-Johani	(Saudi Arabia) Al-Qaisumah	End of loan	
30 June 2024	FW	99	(Saudi Arabia) Hassan Al Salis	(Saudi Arabia) Al-Orobah	End of loan	
23 August 2024	GK	1	(Hungary) Péter Szappanos	(Hungary) Paks	Undisclosed	
29 August 2024	MF	6	(Saudi Arabia) Naif Masoud	(Saudi Arabia) Al-Qadsiah	Free	
30 August 2024	FW	7	(Morocco) Amine Sbaï	(France) Grenoble	Undisclosed	
1 September 2024	GK	31	(Saudi Arabia) Habib Al-Wotayan	(Saudi Arabia) Al-Hilal	Free	
1 September 2024	DF	12	(Saudi Arabia) Mohammed Al-Kunaydiri	(Saudi Arabia) Abha	Free	
8 January 2025	FW	9	(Argentina) Matías Vargas	(China) Shanghai Port	Free	
31 January 2025	DF	13	(Saudi Arabia) Hussain Qassem	(Saudi Arabia) Al-Tai	Free	
31 January 2025	DF	44	(Portugal) Jorge Fernandes	(Portugal) Vitória Guimarães	$518,000	
31 January 2025	MF	33	(Comoros) Zaydou Youssouf	(Portugal) Famalicão	$6,220,000	
31 January 2025	FW	99	(Brazil) Matheus Machado	(Belgium) Zulte Waregem	$3,000,000	

=== Loans in ===
Start date	End date	Position	No.	Player	From club	Fee	Ref.
25 August 2024	End of season	MF	18	(Saudi Arabia) Suhayb Al-Zaid	(Saudi Arabia) Al-Hilal	None	
31 January 2025	End of season	GK	26	(Saudi Arabia) Nawaf Al-Aqidi	(Saudi Arabia) Al-Nassr	None	

=== Transfers out ===
Exit date	Position	No.	Player	To club	Fee	Ref.
30 June 2024	MF	7	(Saudi Arabia) Mukhtar Ali	(Saudi Arabia) Al-Nassr	End of loan	
1 July 2024	MF	66	(Saudi Arabia) Abbas Al-Hassan	(Saudi Arabia) Neom	Undisclosed	
3 July 2024	GK	26	(Saudi Arabia) Mustafa Malayekah	(Saudi Arabia) Neom	Free	
11 July 2024	MF	15	(Saudi Arabia) Hassan Al-Mohammed	(Saudi Arabia) Al-Adalah	Free	
14 July 2024	DF	87	(Saudi Arabia) Qassem Lajami	(Saudi Arabia) Al-Qadsiah	Free	
17 July 2024	MF	18	(Saudi Arabia) Mohammed Al-Saeed	(Saudi Arabia) Al-Okhdood	Free	
19 July 2024	DF	5	(Saudi Arabia) Fahad Al-Harbi	(Saudi Arabia) Neom	Free	
1 August 2024	DF	25	(Saudi Arabia) Tawfiq Buhimed	(Saudi Arabia) Al-Adalah	Free	
2 August 2024	DF	2	(Saudi Arabia) Ali Al-Zubaidi	(Saudi Arabia) Al-Ula	Free	
12 August 2024	GK	1	(Sweden) Jacob Rinne	(Sweden) Djurgården	Free	
15 August 2024	DF	83	(Saudi Arabia) Salem Al-Najdi	(Saudi Arabia) Al-Nassr	$4,800,000	
25 August 2024	MF	37	(Spain) Cristian Tello	(Saudi Arabia) Al-Orobah	Free	
30 August 2024	MF	36	(Saudi Arabia) Rakan Al-Qahtani	(Saudi Arabia) Al-Nojoom	Free	
23 September 2024	MF	30	(Saudi Arabia) Osama Al-Mobairik	(Saudi Arabia) Hajer	Free	
8 January 2025	MF	10	(Armenia) Lucas Zelarayán	(Argentina) Belgrano	Undisclosed	
26 January 2025	MF	77	(Saudi Arabia) Ali Al-Jassem	(Saudi Arabia) Al-Ain	Free	
27 January 2025	FW	99	(Saudi Arabia) Hassan Al Salis	(Saudi Arabia) Abha	Free	
31 January 2025	DF	12	(Saudi Arabia) Mohammed Al-Kunaydiri	(Saudi Arabia) Al-Tai	Free	

=== Loans out ===
Start date	End date	Position	No.	Player	To club	Fee	Ref.
23 August 2024	End of season	FW	20	(Saudi Arabia) Abdullah Al-Mogren	(Saudi Arabia) Damac	None	
22 September 2024	End of season	GK	40	(Saudi Arabia) Sattam Al-Subaie	(Saudi Arabia) Mudhar	None	
31 January 2025	End of season	GK	1	(Hungary) Péter Szappanos	(Hungary) Paks	None	
31 January 2025	End of season	MF	80	(Saudi Arabia) Faisal Al-Abdulwahed	(Saudi Arabia) Al-Batin	None	

== Pre-season ==
21 July 2024 Friendly	Al-Fateh (Saudi Arabia)	0–3	(Croatia) Varaždin	Krapina, Croatia
18:30 CEST		Report	Dabro 28'; Šego 68'; Poldrugač 87'	Stadium: SRC Podgora

27 July 2024 Friendly	Al-Fateh (Saudi Arabia)	1–0	(United Arab Emirates) Al Bataeh	Slovenia
18:00 CEST	Al-Enezi 25'	Report

30 July 2024 Friendly	Al-Fateh (Saudi Arabia)	1–1	(Croatia) Lokomotiva Zagreb	Rogaška Slatina, Slovenia
18:00 CEST	Al-Najdi 22'	Report		Stadium: Športni center Rogaška Slatina

6 August 2024 Friendly	Al-Fateh (Saudi Arabia)	2–2	(Saudi Arabia) Al-Khaleej	Slovenia
17:30 CEST	Djaniny 47'; Batna 76'	Report	Al-Fahad 25'; Al Dubais 73'

17 August 2024 Friendly	Al-Fateh (Saudi Arabia)	3–0	(Saudi Arabia) Mudhar	Al-Hasa, Saudi Arabia
19:30 AST	Denayer; Al-Othman; Al-Enezi	Report		Stadium: Al-Fateh Club Stadium

== Competitions ==
=== Overview ===
Competition	Record							
Competition	Pld	W	D	L	GF	GA	GD	Win %
Pro League	34	11	6	17	47	61	−14	32.35
King Cup	1	0	0	1	0	2	−2	0.00
Total	35	11	6	18	47	63	−16	31.43

Updated to match played 26 May 2025
Source: Competitions

=== Pro League ===
==== League table ====
Pos	Team	Pld	W	D	L	GF	GA	GD	Pts
8	Al-Taawoun	34	12	9	13	40	39	+1	45
9	Al-Kholood	34	12	4	18	42	64	−22	40
10	Al-Fateh	34	11	6	17	47	61	−14	39
11	Al-Riyadh	34	10	8	16	37	52	−15	38
12	Al-Khaleej	34	10	7	17	40	57	−17	37

Source: SPL
Rules for classification: 1) Points; 2) Head-to-head points; 3) Head-to-head goal difference; 4) Total goal difference; 5) Total goals scored; 6) Fair-play points
(Note: Head-to-head record is used only after all the matches between the teams in question have been played).

==== Results summary ====
Overall								Home						Away					
Pld	W	D	L	GF	GA	GD	Pts	W	D	L	GF	GA	GD	W	D	L	GF	GA	GD
34	11	6	17	47	61	−14	39	7	3	7	28	26	+2	4	3	10	19	35	−16

Last updated: 26 May 2025.
Source: Saudi Pro League

==== Results by round ====
Round	1	2	3	4	5	6	7	8	9	10	11	12	13	14	15	16	17	18	19	20	21	22	23	24	25	26	27	28	29	30	31	32	33	34
Ground	A	H	H	A	H	A	H	A	H	H	A	H	A	H	A	H	A	H	A	A	H	A	H	A	H	A	A	H	A	H	A	H	A	H
Result	L	W	L	L	L	L	D	L	D	L	L	L	D	L	L	W	L	D	L	W	W	W	L	L	W	D	W	W	D	W	L	L	W	W
Position	18	12	14	16	18	18	18	18	18	18	18	18	18	18	18	18	18	18	18	18	17	15	15	15	15	16	14	13	13	11	13	14	12	10

Updated to match(es) played on 26 May 2025. Source: Saudi Pro League
A = Away; H = Home; W = Win; D = Draw; L = Loss

==== Matches ====
All times are local, AST (UTC+3).

Win Draw Loss Postponed

23 August 2024 1	Al-Qadsiah	3–0	Al-Fateh	Dammam
21:00	Quiñones 34', 90+2', (yellow card) 49'; Al-Othman 73'; Fernández (yellow card) 83'	Report		Stadium: Prince Mohamed bin Fahd Stadium; Attendance: 5,265; Referee: Ahmed Al-Rumaikhani

27 August 2024 2	Al-Fateh	1–0	Al-Ahli	Al-Hasa
18:45	Baattiah (yellow card) 26'; Djaniny 54'	Report	Demiral (yellow card) 20'; Majrashi (yellow card) 49'	Stadium: Al-Fateh Club Stadium; Attendance: 7,054; Referee: Abdullah Al-Shehri

14 September 2024 3	Al-Fateh	1–2	Al-Ettifaq	Al-Hasa
18:30	Djaniny 64'	Report	Radif 42'; Costa 73'; Al-Olayan (yellow card) 80'	Stadium: Al-Fateh Club Stadium; Attendance: 9,826; Referee: Abdulsamad Bakri

19 September 2024 4	Al-Orobah	1–0	Al-Fateh	Sakakah
19:00	Al-Maqati (yellow card) 22'; Tello 50'; I. Al-Zubaidi (yellow card) 53'; Muhar (yellow card) 57'; Guðmundsson (yellow card) 84'	Report	Saâdane (yellow card) 29'; Zelarayán (yellow card) 49'; Denayer (yellow card) 77'	Stadium: Al Jouf University Stadium; Attendance: 2,710; Referee: Mohammed Al-Harbi

28 September 2024 5	Al-Fateh	2–4	Al-Okhdood	Al-Hasa
18:10	Djaniny 7'; Bendebka 19', (yellow card) 35'; Al-Mousa (red card) 54'	Report	Koné 26'; Al-Rubaie (yellow card) 50' (yellow-red card) 59'; Asiri 70'; Musona 74'; Al Jahif 90+1'	Stadium: Al-Fateh Club Stadium; Attendance: Abdullah Al-Shehri; Referee: 3,793

5 October 2024 6	Al-Taawoun	2–0	Al-Fateh	Buraidah
18:25	Mandash (yellow card) 38'; Barrow 45+3'; Pedro 81'	Report	Bendebka (yellow card) 45+1'; Djaniny (yellow card) 72'	Stadium: Al-Taawoun Club Stadium; Attendance: 2,214; Referee: Majed Al-Shamrani

20 October 2024 7	Al-Fateh	1–1	Al-Kholood	Al-Hasa
17:45	Djaniny 54'	Report	Collado 9'; Al-Hammami (yellow card) 26'	Stadium: Al-Fateh Club Stadium; Attendance: 4,823; Referee: Khaled Al-Ahmari

26 October 2024 8	Al-Raed	2–1	Al-Fateh	Buraidah
18:05	Qasmi (yellow card) 30'; Szappanos 45+2' (o.g.); Abeid (yellow card) 47'; Al-Amri (yellow card) 62'Saâdane 65' (o.g.); Hawsawi (yellow card) 69'; Sunyur (yellow card) 90+9'	Report	Al-Zaid (yellow card) 26'; Al-Othman (yellow card) 45+1'; Saâdane (yellow card) 63'; Al-Daheem (yellow card) 78'; Al-Anazi 85'	Stadium: Al-Raed Club Stadium; Attendance: 891; Referee: Fareeh Al-Jaloud

2 November 2024 9	Al-Fateh	1–1	Al-Fayha	Al-Hasa
17:35	Zelarayán 54'	Report	Rangel (yellow card) 41'; Al-Rashidi (yellow card) 45+2'; K. Kaabi 45+4'; Abdi (yellow card) 60'	Stadium: Al-Fateh Club Stadium; Attendance: 3,769; Referee: Ahmed Al-Rumaikhani

9 November 2024 10	Al-Fateh	1–2	Al-Khaleej	Al-Hasa
17:30	Baattiah (yellow card) 11'; Bendebka (yellow card) 31'; Batna (yellow card) 80', (goal) 90+9'	Report	Kourbelis (yellow card) 25'; Al-Khabrani (yellow card) 47'; Al Salem 55', 87'; Tisserand (yellow card) 72'; Al Hamsal (yellow card) 74'	Stadium: Al-Fateh Club Stadium; Attendance: 10,334; Referee: Faisal Al-Blwi

24 November 2024 11	Al-Ittihad	2–0	Al-Fateh	Jeddah
20:00	Hawsawi (yellow card) 32'; Fabinho 58'; Aouar 90'	Report	Al-Fuhaid (yellow card) 30'; Al-Mousa (yellow card) 37'; Al-Anazi (yellow card) 85'	Stadium: Prince Abdullah Al-Faisal Sports City; Attendance: 13,823; Referee: Sultan Al-Harbi

28 November 2024 12	Al-Fateh	1–2	Al-Riyadh	Al-Hasa
20:00	Al-Zaid (yellow card) 29'; Bendebka 45+3'; Al-Abdulwahed (yellow card) 45+9'; Saâdane (yellow card) 89'	Report	Al-Khaibari (yellow card) 2'; Assiri (yellow card) 45+1', (goal) 61'; Borjan (yellow card) 45+8'; Mensah 81'	Stadium: Al-Fateh Club Stadium; Attendance: 6,022; Referee: Khaled Al-Ahmari

5 December 2024 13	Al-Shabab	2–2	Al-Fateh	Riyadh
20:00	Al-Shuwayrikh (yellow card) 37'; Camara 54'; Al-Thani 57'; Al-Sadi (yellow card) 90+8'	Report	Batna 51' (pen.); Al-Julaydan (yellow card) 58'; Al-Masoud 80'	Stadium: Al-Shabab Club Stadium; Attendance: 4,277; Referee: Majed Al-Shamrani

9 January 2025 14	Al-Fateh	1–2	Al-Wehda	Al-Hasa
17:45	Masoud (yellow card) 38'; Batna (yellow card) 55'; Bendebka 57'; Djaniny (yellow card) 87'	Report	El Yamiq (yellow card) 8'; Goodwin 14'; Ighalo 26'; Al-Hejji (yellow card) 90+4'	Stadium: Al-Fateh Club Stadium; Attendance: 4,182; Referee: Majed Al-Shamrani

16 January 2025 15	Al-Hilal	9–0	Al-Fateh	Riyadh
18:05	Neves (yellow card) 7'; Koulibaly 20'; Lodi 39'; Leonardo 45+6' (pen.), 54', 65'; Milinković-Savić 45+9'; Al-Hamdan 89'; Malcom 90+5'; Al-Abdulwahed 90+8' (o.g.); Cancelo (yellow card) 90+10'	Report	Baattiah (yellow card) 45+8'; Al-Zaid (yellow card) 64'; Al-Daheem (yellow card) 70'; Al-Abdulwahed (yellow card) 90+8'; Al-Jari (red card) 90+11'	Stadium: Kingdom Arena; Attendance: 24,962; Referee: Sergei Karasev (Russia)

22 January 2025 16	Al-Fateh	2–1	Damac	Al-Hasa
17:55	Bendebka 78' (pen.); Al-Othman (yellow card) 80'; Al-Daheem (yellow card) 90+9'; Batna 90+20' (pen.)	Report	Chafaï (yellow card) 20'; Stanciu 69'; Al-Sibyani (yellow card) 90+7'	Stadium: Al-Fateh Club Stadium; Attendance: 3,097; Referee: Khaled Al-Teris

26 January 2025 17	Al-Nassr	3–1	Al-Fateh	Riyadh
20:00	Saâdane 41' (o.g.); Ronaldo (yellow card) 55', (goal) 87'; Simakan 57'	Report	Saâdane (yellow card) 56'; Baattiah (yellow card) 61'; Batna 72'	Stadium: Al-Awwal Park; Attendance: 12,804; Referee: Andris Treimanis (Latvia)

1 February 2025 18	Al-Fateh	1–1	Al-Qadsiah	Al-Hasa
18:00	Al-Zarie (yellow card) 45'; Machado 47'	Report	Quiñones 2'	Stadium: Al-Fateh Club Stadium; Attendance: 10,629; Referee: Nazareno Arasa (Argentina)

7 February 2025 19	Al-Ahli	2–0	Al-Fateh	Jeddah
20:00	Toney 17' (pen.), 62' (pen.), (yellow card) 83'; Balobaid (yellow card) 35' (yellow-red card) 39'; Mahrez (yellow card) 74'; Al-Majhad (yellow card) 77'	Report	Qassem (red card) 14'; Fernandes (yellow card) 65'; Baattiah (yellow card) 86'; Al-Othman (yellow card) 90'	Stadium: Alinma Stadium; Attendance: 16,787; Referee: Kristo Tohver (Estonia)

14 February 2025 20	Al-Ettifaq	1–2	Al-Fateh	Dammam
18:05	Vitinho 45+5'; Medrán (yellow card) 65'; Al-Otaibi (yellow card) 80'	Report	Batna 31' (pen.); Al-Aqidi (yellow card) 45'; Bendebka 45+9'; Djaniny (yellow card) 54'	Stadium: EGO Stadium; Attendance: 5,311; Referee: Abdullah Al-Kharbosh

20 February 2025 21	Al-Fateh	1–0	Al-Orobah	Al-Hasa
18:15	Youssouf (yellow card) 25'; Batna 31'; Saâdane (yellow card) 71'; Al-Julaydan (yellow card) 77'	Report	I. Al-Zubaidi (yellow card) 36'; Al-Qarni (yellow card) 86'; F. Al-Zubaidi (yellow card) 90+1'; Al-Torais (yellow card) 90+7'	Stadium: Al-Fateh Club Stadium; Attendance: 10,649; Referee: Sultan Al-Harbi

24 February 2025 22	Al-Okhdood	1–3	Al-Fateh	Najran
17:15	Musona 30', (yellow card) 59'; Al-Rubaie (yellow card) 47'; Al-Qaydhi (yellow card) 51'; Hawsawi (yellow card) 81'; Vítor (yellow card) 90+10'	Report	Djaniny 26'; Bendebka 49' (pen.); Batna 82' (pen.); Al-Aqidi (yellow card) 89'; Al-Othman (yellow card) 90+10'	Stadium: Prince Hathloul bin Abdulaziz Sports City; Attendance: 817; Referee: Majed Al-Shamrani

1 March 2025 23	Al-Fateh	1–2	Al-Taawoun	Al-Hasa
22:00	Fernandes (yellow card) 28'; Bendebka 45+3'; Saâdane (yellow card) 88'; Machado (yellow card) 90+2'; Al-Anazi (red card) 90+13'	Report	Rivas (yellow card) 60'; Barrow 69', 90+9'; Adam (yellow card) 78'; Fajr (yellow card) 90+1'; Bahebri (yellow card) 90+1'	Stadium: Al-Fateh Club Stadium; Attendance: 8,574; Referee: Sami Al-Jires

6 March 2025 24	Al-Kholood	2–1	Al-Fateh	Ar Rass
22:00	Fernandes 31' (o.g.); Troost-Ekong (yellow card) 45+10'; Muleka 70'; Al-Shamrani (yellow card) 72'	Report	Machado (yellow card) 13' (yellow-red card) 82'; Sbaï 76'; Fernandes (yellow card) 78'	Stadium: Al-Hazem Club Stadium; Attendance: 2,280; Referee: Sultan Al-Harbi

13 March 2025 25	Al-Fateh	3–1	Al-Raed	Al-Hasa
22:00	Saâdane (yellow card) 14'; Vargas 27', 60'; Fernandes (yellow card) 55'; Batna 65' (pen.)	Report	Qasmi (yellow card) 62'; Gonzalez 82'	Stadium: Al-Fateh Club Stadium; Attendance: 7,558; Referee: Majed Al-Shamrani

6 April 2025 26	Al-Fayha	1–1	Al-Fateh	Al Majma'ah
17:25	López 64', (yellow card) 72'	Report	Sbaï 28'; Al-Othman (yellow card) 90+6'	Stadium: Al Majma'ah Sports City; Attendance: 798; Referee: Ahmed Al-Rumaikhani

12 April 2025 27	Al-Khaleej	1–5	Al-Fateh	Dammam
18:35	Kourbelis 4'; Al Hamsal (yellow card) 50'	Report	Vargas 44', 71'; Batna 47'; Sbaï 52'; Bendebka 65' (pen.); Al-Zarie (yellow card) 80'; Qassem (yellow card) 87'	Stadium: Prince Mohamed bin Fahd Stadium; Attendance: 1,924; Referee: Abdullah Al-Harbi

17 April 2025 28	Al-Fateh	2–0	Al-Ittihad	Al-Ahsa
21:00	Sbaï 10'; Saâdane (yellow card) 43'; Vargas 69'; Youssouf (yellow card) 90'	Report	Al-Amri (yellow card) 71'	Stadium: Al-Fateh Club Stadium; Attendance: 11,278; Referee: Facundo Tello (Argentina)

23 April 2025 29	Al-Riyadh	2–2	Al-Fateh	Riyadh
18:55	Tozé 20'; Selemani 49'; Mensah (yellow card) 50'; Tambakti (yellow card) 89'	Report	Sbaï 45+2'; Bendebka 53'	Stadium: Prince Faisal bin Fahd Sports City Stadium; Attendance: 1,060; Referee: Faisal Al-Blwi

1 May 2025 30	Al-Fateh	3–1	Al-Shabab	Al-Hasa
21:00	Vargas 2'; Bendebka 4', (yellow card) 80'; Batna 16'; Al-Zarie (yellow card) 81'; Saâdane (yellow card) 82'	Report	Guanca 13'; Carrasco (yellow card) 80'; Podence (yellow card) 90+1' (yellow-red card) 90+2'	Stadium: Al-Fateh Club Stadium; Attendance: 11,214; Referee: Khalid Al-Turais

10 May 2025 31	Al-Wehda	1–0	Al-Fateh	Jeddah
19:25	Noor 8'; Ighalo (yellow card) 23'; Al-Hejji (yellow card) 64'; Bakshween (yellow card) 81'	Report	Al-Zarie (yellow card) 5'; Youssouf (yellow card) 57'	Stadium: Prince Abdullah Al-Faisal Sports City; Attendance: 261; Referee: Majed Al-Shamrani

16 May 2025 32	Al-Fateh	3–4	Al-Hilal	Al-Hasa
18:55	Bendebka 15', 24'; Qassem (yellow card) 18'; Saâdane (yellow card) 77'; Batna 82', (yellow card) 87'; Al-Othman (yellow card) 90+17'	Report	N. Al-Dawsari 50'; S. Al-Dawsari 60'; Mitrović 85', 90+2'; Neves (yellow card) 90+9'; Al-Tombakti (yellow card) 90+13'	Stadium: Al-Fateh Club Stadium; Attendance: 8,318; Referee: Mario Escobar (Guatemala)

22 May 2025 33	Damac	0–1	Al-Fateh	Khamis Mushait
19:15	Hamed (yellow card) 23'; Al-Sibyani (yellow card) 45+2'; Al-Anazi (yellow card) 45+3' (yellow-red card) 51'	Report	Batna 63'; Youssouf (yellow card) 75'	Stadium: Damac Club Stadium; Attendance: 2,610; Referee: Faisal Al-Blwi

26 May 2025 34	Al-Fateh	3–2	Al-Nassr	Al-Hasa
21:00	Vargas 45+4'; Masoud (yellow card) 53'; Batna 81', (yellow card) 83'; Saâdane (yellow card) 90+3'; Machado 90+6', (yellow card) 90+7'	Report	Ronaldo 42'; Al-Sulaiheem (yellow card) 45+1'; Yahya (yellow card) 54'; Mané 75'; Al-Najdi (yellow card) 79'	Stadium: Al-Fateh Club Stadium; Attendance: 9,512; Referee: Szymon Marciniak (Poland)

=== King Cup ===
All times are local, AST (UTC+3).

22 September 2024 Round of 32	Al-Jabalain	2–0	Al-Fateh	Ha'il
21:00	Narváez 11' (pen.); Al-Absi 68'; Carné (yellow card) 90+3'	Report	Bendebka (yellow card) 45+5'	Stadium: Prince Abdulaziz bin Musa'ed Sports City; Attendance: 380; Referee: Abdullah Zarban

== Statistics ==
=== Appearances ===
Last updated on 26 May 2025.

No.	Pos	Nat	Player	Total		Pro League		King Cup	
No.	Pos	Nat	Player	Apps	Goals	Apps	Goals	Apps	Goals
Goalkeepers
26	GK	(Saudi Arabia) KSA	Nawaf Al-Aqidi	16	0	16	0	0	0
48	GK	(Saudi Arabia) KSA	Muhannad Al Yahya	0	0	0	0	0	0
55	GK	(Saudi Arabia) KSA	Waleed Al-Enezi	1	0	1	0	0	0
Defenders
4	DF	(Saudi Arabia) KSA	Ziyad Al-Jari	5	0	2+3	0	0	0
13	DF	(Saudi Arabia) KSA	Hussain Qassem	11	0	3+8	0	0	0
15	DF	(Saudi Arabia) KSA	Saeed Baattiah	26	0	18+7	0	1	0
17	DF	(Morocco) MAR	Marwane Saâdane	29	0	28	0	1	0
24	DF	(Saudi Arabia) KSA	Ammar Al-Daheem	25	0	13+11	0	0+1	0
42	DF	(Saudi Arabia) KSA	Ahmed Al-Julaydan	25	0	12+13	0	0	0
44	DF	(Portugal) POR	Jorge Fernandes	16	0	16	0	0	0
63	DF	(Saudi Arabia) KSA	Montadhar Al-Shaqaq	1	0	0+1	0	0	0
82	DF	(Saudi Arabia) KSA	Hussain Al-Zarie	22	0	20+2	0	0	0
Midfielders
6	MF	(Saudi Arabia) KSA	Naif Masoud	12	0	3+8	0	1	0
7	MF	(France) FRA	Amine Sbaï	27	5	17+9	5	1	0
11	MF	(Morocco) MAR	Mourad Batna	28	13	26+2	13	0	0
14	MF	(Saudi Arabia) KSA	Mohammed Al-Fuhaid	18	0	8+10	0	0	0
18	MF	(Saudi Arabia) KSA	Suhayb Al-Zaid	29	0	19+9	0	1	0
28	MF	(Algeria) ALG	Sofiane Bendebka	33	12	32	12	1	0
33	MF	(Comoros) COM	Zaydou Youssouf	16	0	16	0	0	0
75	MF	(Saudi Arabia) KSA	Mahdi Al-Aboud	0	0	0	0	0	0
88	MF	(Saudi Arabia) KSA	Othman Al-Othman	24	0	9+14	0	1	0
94	MF	(Saudi Arabia) KSA	Abdullah Al-Anazi	16	1	5+10	1	0+1	0
Forwards
9	FW	(Argentina) ARG	Matías Vargas	20	7	20	7	0	0
21	FW	(Cape Verde) CPV	Djaniny	25	5	19+5	5	1	0
29	FW	(Saudi Arabia) KSA	Ali Al-Masoud	16	1	1+14	1	0+1	0
49	FW	(Saudi Arabia) KSA	Saad Al Shurafa	14	0	4+9	0	0+1	0
99	FW	(Brazil) BRA	Matheus Machado	13	2	4+9	2	0	0
Players sent out on loan this season
1	GK	(Hungary) HUN	Péter Szappanos	18	0	17	0	1	0
80	MF	(Saudi Arabia) KSA	Faisal Al-Abdulwahed	5	0	1+3	0	0+1	0
Player who made an appearance this season but left the club
8	MF	(Saudi Arabia) KSA	Nooh Al-Mousa	9	0	7+2	0	0	0
10	MF	(Armenia) ARM	Lucas Zelarayán	11	1	11	1	0	0
12	DF	(Saudi Arabia) KSA	Mohammed Al-Kunaydiri	15	0	11+3	0	1	0
64	DF	(Belgium) BEL	Jason Denayer	16	0	14+1	0	1	0
77	MF	(Saudi Arabia) KSA	Ali Al-Jassem	1	0	1	0	0	0

=== Goalscorers ===
Rank	No.	Pos	Nat	Name	Pro League	King Cup	Total
1	11	MF	(Morocco)	Mourad Batna	13	0	13
2	28	MF	(Algeria)	Sofiane Bendebka	12	0	12
3	9	FW	(Argentina)	Matías Vargas	7	0	7
4	7	MF	(France)	Amine Sbaï	5	0	5
4	21	FW	(Cape Verde)	Djaniny	5	0	5
6	99	FW	(Brazil)	Matheus Machado	2	0	2
7	10	MF	(Armenia)	Lucas Zelarayán	1	0	1
7	29	FW	(Saudi Arabia)	Ali Al-Masoud	1	0	1
7	94	MF	(Saudi Arabia)	Abdullah Al-Anazi	1	0	1
Own goal					0	0	0
Total					47	0	47

Last Updated: 26 May 2025

=== Assists ===
Rank	No.	Pos	Nat	Name	Pro League	King Cup	Total
1	11	MF	(Morocco)	Mourad Batna	6	0	6
2	7	MF	(France)	Amine Sbaï	4	0	4
2	9	FW	(Argentina)	Matías Vargas	4	0	4
4	18	MF	(Saudi Arabia)	Suhayb Al-Zaid	3	0	3
3	10	MF	(Armenia)	Lucas Zelarayán	2	0	2
3	42	DF	(Saudi Arabia)	Ahmed Al-Julaydan	2	0	2
3	94	MF	(Saudi Arabia)	Abdullah Al-Anazi	2	0	2
8	8	MF	(Saudi Arabia)	Nooh Al-Mousa	1	0	1
8	13	DF	(Saudi Arabia)	Hussain Qassem	1	0	1
8	26	GK	(Saudi Arabia)	Nawaf Al-Aqidi	1	0	1
8	28	MF	(Algeria)	Sofiane Bendebka	1	0	1
8	33	MF	(Comoros)	Zaydou Youssouf	1	0	1
8	49	FW	(Saudi Arabia)	Saad Al Shurafa	1	0	1
8	82	DF	(Saudi Arabia)	Hussain Al-Zarie	1	0	1
8	88	MF	(Saudi Arabia)	Othman Al-Othman	1	0	1
Total					31	0	31

Last Updated: 26 May 2025

=== Clean sheets ===
Rank	No.	Pos	Nat	Name	Pro League	King Cup	Total
1	26	GK	(Saudi Arabia)	Nawaf Al-Aqidi	2	0	2
2	1	GK	(Hungary)	Péter Szappanos	1	0	1
2	55	GK	(Saudi Arabia)	Waleed Al-Enezi	1	0	1
Total					4	0	4

Last Updated: 22 May 2025
