= Mourad Batna =

Moroccan footballer

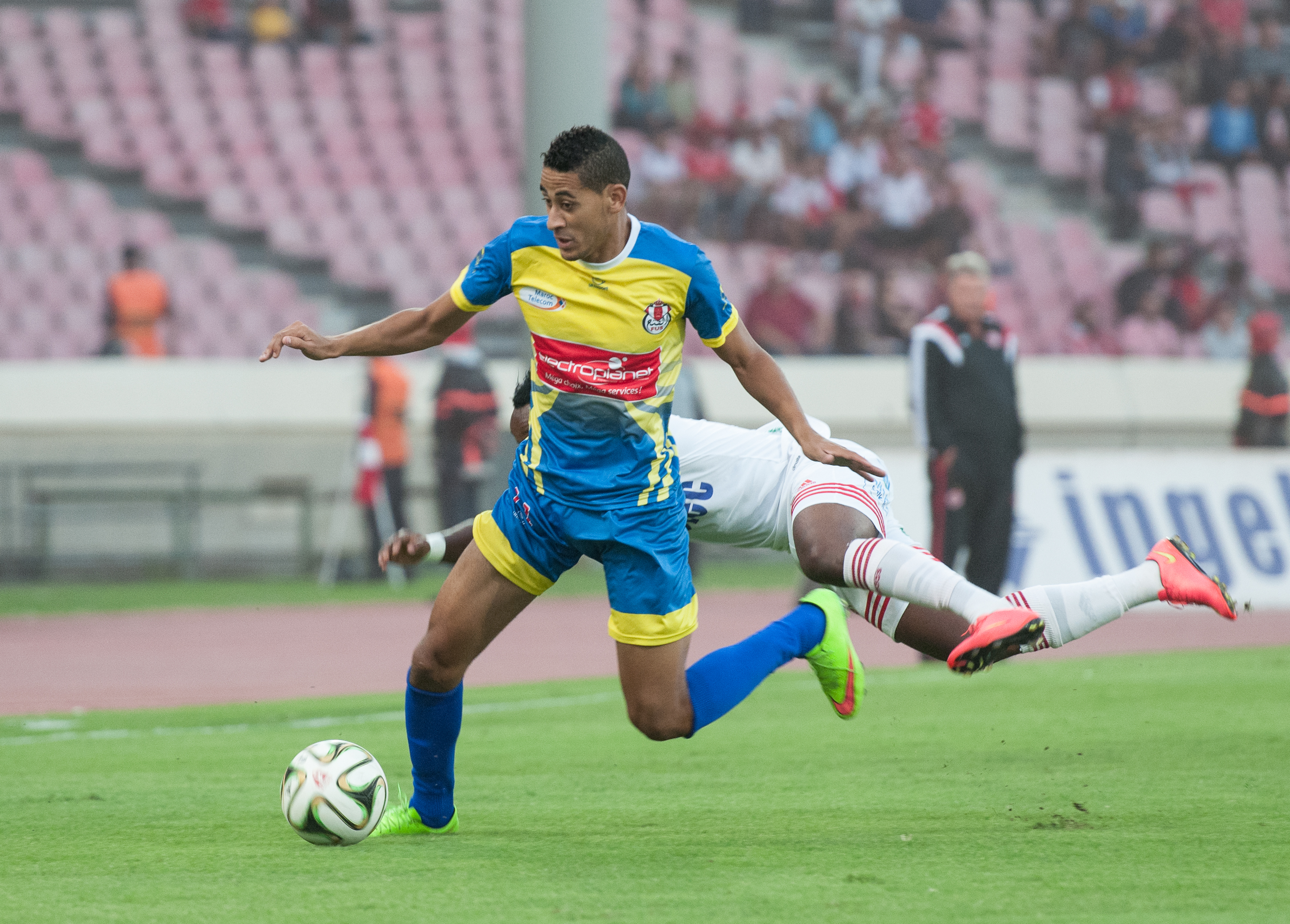
- Mourad Batna in 2014.

Personal information
- Full name: Mourad Batna
- Date of birth: 27 June 1990 (age 36)
- Place of birth: Lqliâa, Morocco
- Height: 1.84 m (6 ft 0 in)
- Position: Winger

Team information
- Current team: Al-Fateh
- Number: 11

Senior career*
Years	Team	Apps	(Gls)
2010–2012	Hassania Agadir	39	(8)
2012–2017	FUS Rabat	101	(32)
2016–2017	→ Emirates Club (loan)	23	(11)
2017–2019	Al Wahda FC	31	(15)
2019–2020	Al-Jazira	11	(0)
2020–	Al-Fateh	156	(54)

International career
2016–	Morocco	2	(0)
- * Club domestic league appearances and goals as of 15 October 2026

Mourad Batna (born 27 June 1990) is a Moroccan footballer currently plays for Al-Fateh as a winger.

== Career statistics ==
As of match played on 24 February 2025

Appearances and goals by club, season and competition
Club	Season	League			Cup		League Cup		Other		Total	
Club	Season	Division	Apps	Goals	Apps	Goals	Apps	Goals	Apps	Goals	Apps	Goals
Hassania Agadir	2010–11	Botola	20	3	0	0	—		—		20	3
Hassania Agadir	2011–12	Botola	19	5	0	0	—		—		19	5
Hassania Agadir	Total		39	8	0	0	0	0	0	0	39	8
FUS Rabat	2012–13	Botola	24	6	0	0	—		2 (Note: Appearances in CAF Champions League)	1	26	7
FUS Rabat	2013–14	Botola	27	7	0	0	—		1 (Note: Appearances in CAF Confederation Cup)	1	28	8
FUS Rabat	2014–15	Botola	24	8	0	0	—		3 (Note: Appearances in CAF Confederation Cup)	3	27	11
FUS Rabat	2015–16	Botola	26	11	5	1	—		4 (Note: Appearances in CAF Confederation Cup)	3	35	15
FUS Rabat	Total		101	32	5	1	0	0	10	8	116	41
Emirates (loan)	2016–17	UPL	23	11	2	2	0	0	—		25	13
Al Wahda	2017–18	UPL	20	7	3	1	10	2	6 (Note: 2 Appearances in Arab Club Champions Cup, 3 Appearances in AFC Champions League, 1 Appearance in UAE Super Cup)	4	39	14
Al Wahda	2018–19	UPL	11	8	0	0	3	1	1 (Note: Appearances in UAE Super Cup)	1	15	10
Al Wahda	Total		31	15	3	1	13	3	7	5	54	24
Al Jazira	2019–20	UPL	11	0	0	0	4	0	2 (Note: Appearances in Arab Club Champions Cup)	1	17	1
Al Fateh	2020–21	SPL	26	6	3	3	—		—		29	9
Al Fateh	2021–22	SPL	17	5	1	2	—		—		18	7
Al Fateh	2022–23	SPL	25	10	2	1	—		—		27	11
Al Fateh	2023–24	SPL	22	8	2	2	—		—		24	10
Al Fateh	2024–25	SPL	16	7	0	0	—		—		16	7
Al Fateh	Total		106	36	8	8	—		—		114	44
Career totals			311	102	13	11	17	3	19	14	365	131

- Assist Goals

Season	Team	Assists
2016–17	Emirates	5
2017–18	Al Wahda	15
2018–19	Al Wahda	5
2019–20	Al Jazira	2
2020–21	Al-Fateh	7
2021–22	Al-Fateh	3
2022–23	Al-Fateh	9
2023–24	Al-Fateh	10
2024–25	Al-Fateh	6
2024–25	Al-Fateh	8

== Honours ==
FUS Rabat

- Botola Pro: 2015–16
- Moroccan Throne Cup: 2013–14; runner-up: 2014–15

Al Wahda FC

- UAE League Cup: 2017–18
- UAE Super Cup: 2017, 2018

Individual

- Botola Pro Player of the Season: 2014–15
- SPL Player of the Month: April 2023
- SPL Team of the Season: 2022–23
