= Lucas Zelarayán =

Footballer (born 1992)

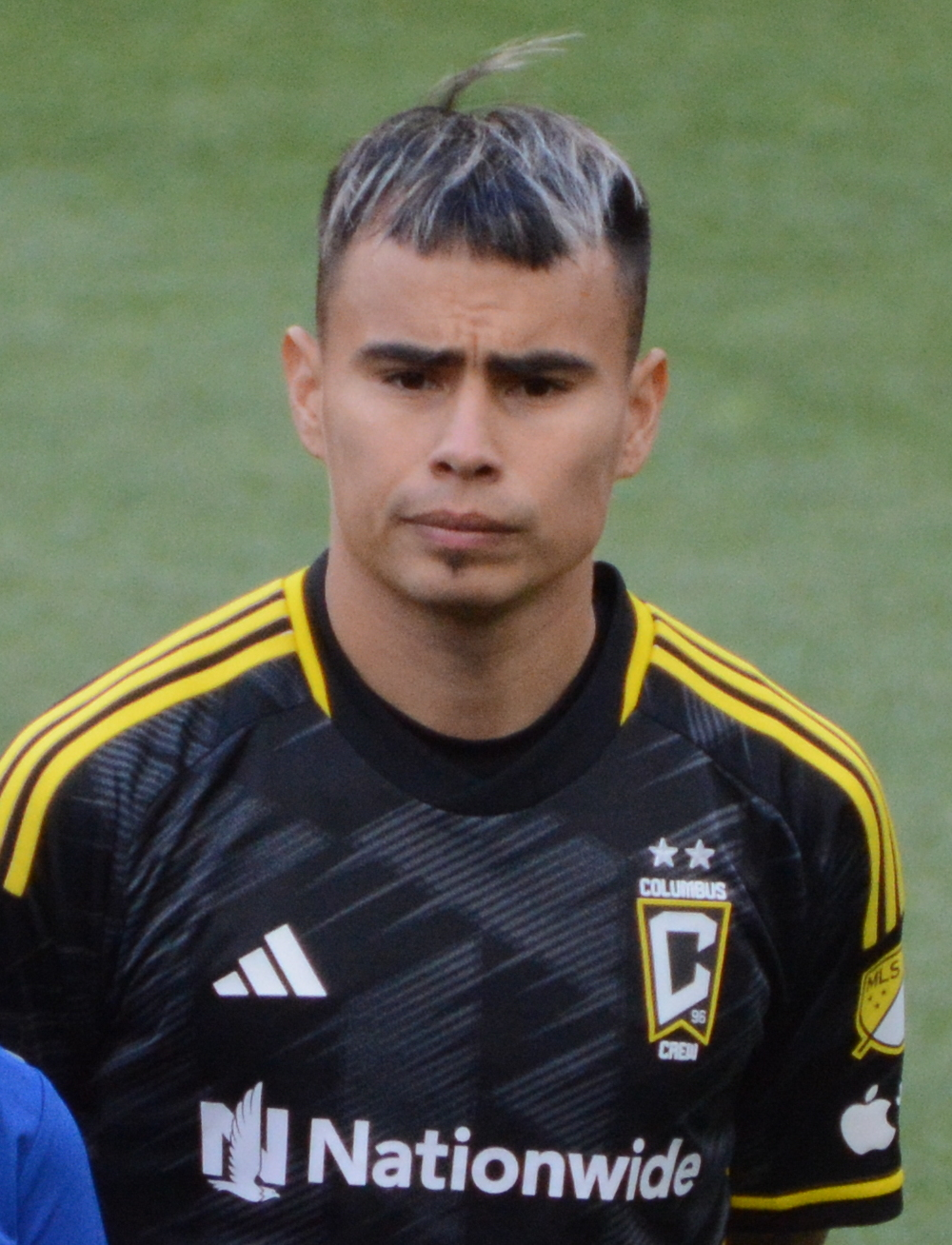
- Zelarayán with Columbus Crew in 2023

Personal information
- Full name: Lucas Manuel Zelarayán
- Date of birth: 20 June 1992 (age 34)
- Place of birth: Córdoba, Argentina
- Height: 1.72 m (5 ft 8 in)
- Position: Attacking midfielder

Team information
- Current team: Belgrano
- Number: 10

Youth career
- 2001–2005: Universitario
- 2005–2008: Club Deportivo Atalaya
- 2008–2012: Belgrano

Senior career*
Years	Team	Apps	(Gls)
2012–2015	Belgrano	75	(10)
2016–2020	Tigres UANL	113	(21)
2020–2023	Columbus Crew	97	(38)
2023–2025	Al-Fateh	41	(9)
2025–	Belgrano	42	(7)

International career^{‡}
2021–	Armenia	26	(5)
- * Club domestic league appearances and goals as of 17:44, 9 July 2026 (UTC) ‡ National team caps and goals as of 14 October 2025 (UTC)

Lucas Manuel Zelarayán (Armenian: Լուկաս Մանուել Զելարայան; born 20 June 1992) is a professional footballer who plays as an attacking midfielder for and captains Argentine Primera División club Belgrano. Born in Argentina, he represents the Armenia national team.

He began his professional career with Belgrano in the Argentine Primera División in 2012, moving in 2016 to Tigres UANL in the Liga MX. He won three league titles and as many Campeón de Campeones tournaments, before an $8 million transfer to the Columbus Crew in 2020. In his first year in Major League Soccer, he won the MLS Cup, scoring twice and assisting once in a 3–0 final win over Seattle Sounders FC and being named MLS Cup Most Valuable Player. In July 2023, he transferred to Al-Fateh for an undisclosed fee.

== Club career ==
=== Youth career and Belgrano ===
Born in Córdoba, Argentina, Zelarayán was nicknamed "El Chino" (The Chinese) from his childhood and kept the nickname during his career. He played his youth football at Las Estrellas, Universitario, and Atalaya, and is a Belgrano youth graduate. He made his senior debut on 25 April 2012, coming on as a second-half substitute for Lucas Parodi in a 2–1 away loss against Rosario Central, for the season's Copa Argentina.

Zelarayán made his Primera División debut on 2 March 2013, replacing Jorge Velázquez in a 2–0 away loss against Newell's Old Boys. His first professional goal came on 7 April of the following year, as he scored the winner in a 2–1 home defeat of River Plate.

On 5 December 2014, after becoming a regular starter, Zelarayán extended his contract until 2018.

On 5 December 2015, amid transfer speculation, Zelarayán played his last game for Belgrano, versus Colón in the Liguilla Pre Sudamericana, where he was given the captain's armband and an emotional farewell by the fans. Over 55,000 spectators chanted his name in unison to bid him farewell.

=== Tigres UANL ===
On 21 December 2015, Zelarayán agreed to a contract with Liga MX side Tigres UANL, signing for a reported 5.5 million. He debuted for the club the following 10 January, replacing Rafael Sóbis in a 1–0 loss at Toluca. Zelarayán scored his first goal abroad on 5 February 2016, netting the last in a 3–1 win at Chiapas. On 22 January 2017, he scored a brace in a 4–2 home win against América. On 6 March 2019, After a long absence of almost five months due to injury, Lucas Zelarayán made his return to the pitch with Tigres, coming on in the 83rd minute to seal a 3–0 aggregate victory against the Houston Dynamo in the CONCACAF Champions League.

=== Columbus Crew ===
On 20 December 2019, Zelarayán moved to Major League Soccer side Columbus Crew for $8 million. Zelarayán made his debut against New York City FC, scoring the match-winning goal in the 56th minute. He was named the league's Newcomer of the Year at the end of the 2020 regular season. In the 2020 MLS Cup final, Zelarayán scored two goals and assisted on another in Columbus' 3–0 win over Seattle Sounders FC to help them win their second ever MLS Cup title. Zelarayán was named the MLS Cup Most Valuable Player after his performance.

During the 2021 MLS season, Zelarayán scored a total of five free-kick goals, with two of them coming in one game vs New York City FC. Both free kick goals turned out to be crucial for the Crew, as they ended up winning 2–1, with the game winning free kick coming in the 5th minute of second half stoppage time, which earned Zelarayán recognition as MLS Player of the Week. Zelarayán was named MLS Player of the Week a second time in the 2021 season after scoring 2 goals in a 3–1 victory against D.C. United. Zelarayán finished the year leading the club in both goals and assists with twelve and seven respectively. At the end of the season, it was announced that Zelarayán had signed a contract extension with the Crew, keeping him with Columbus through the 2024 Major League Soccer season with an option for 2025.

"In training, his quality on the ball is insane. His ability to hit a ball is like when I would talk about (former teammates) Giovinco or David Villa. When these guys hit a ball, it’s just different. They strike the ball cleanly so much more often than everyone else. It’s like their target on the ball is just bigger because their ability to hit a clean ball happens all the time. They hardly ever mis-hit a ball. Lucas has that quality."

— Josh Williams, former Columbus Crew teammate.

The 2022 season began promisingly for Zelarayán as he scored four goals in the first three games of the season, including a free-kick goal as part of his brace in a 3–3 draw against the San Jose Earthquakes. After a fast start in the month of March, which included being named MLS Player of the Month, recurring injury issues were a potential factor in his goalless streak, which lasted for 12 consecutive matches before he scored in the Hell Is Real derby against FC Cincinnati on 17 July. On 5 October, Zelarayán scored a 56-yard free kick, which was the record for the longest free-kick goal in Major League Soccer history.

During week two of the 2023 season, Zelarayán scored both of Columbus' goals in a 2–0 victory over D.C. United, earning the league's Player of the Week award in the process. On 31 May, he scored once and assisted twice in a 3–2 victory against the Colorado Rapids. On 10 June, Zelarayán scored the game-winning goal versus Chicago Fire FC, a 61-yard strike in the 93rd minute, leading Columbus to a 2–1 victory. In his final game for the Crew on July 23, Zelarayán scored his last goal for the club—a free-kick in the 2–1 win against St. Louis City SC in Leagues Cup—setting a club record with 9 free-kick goals across his time with the team.

=== Al Fateh SC ===
On 31 July 2023, Zelarayán was transferred to Al Fateh SC of the Saudi Professional League for an undisclosed transfer fee. On 30 March 2024, Zelarayán assisted on all three of his team's goals in a 3–2 win versus Al-Wehda FC, and would then go on score in his next four appearances, most notably the only goal in a 1–0 victory versus Al-Ettifaq FC.

== International career ==
Born in Argentina, Zelarayán is of Armenian descent through his father. He received an invitation to represent the Armenia national team in June 2020. After accepting the invitation in October 2021, he made his debut for the team in a 1–1 draw against Iceland during the 2022 FIFA World Cup qualification matches.

On 16 June 2023, Zelarayán scored his first international goals in a 4–2 win away to Wales in UEFA Euro 2024 qualification. In the reverse fixture on 18 November, he netted after five minutes in a 1–1 draw.

== Style of play ==
Zelarayán is an attacking midfielder who has played in a variety of positions, including on the winger and in central midfield. Known for his technique, vision, passing, and free-kick ability, he is capable of contributing both as a playmaker and a goal scorer. His positioning and ball control allow him to create scoring opportunities through dribbling, long-range shooting, and final passes.

== Personal life ==
Zelarayán is a fan of Belgrano and grew up supporting them. He lists his idols as Juan Román Riquelme and Paolo Frangipane.

== Career statistics ==
=== Club ===
As of match played 28 November 2024

Appearances and goals by club, season and competition
Club	Season	League			Cup		Continental		Other		Total	
Club	Season	Division	Apps	Goals	Apps	Goals	Apps	Goals	Apps	Goals	Apps	Goals
Belgrano	2011–12	Argentine Primera División	—		1	0	—		—		1	0
Belgrano	2012–13	Argentine Primera División	8	0	1	0	—		—		9	0
Belgrano	2013–14	Argentine Primera División	18	1	1	0	—		—		19	1
Belgrano	2014	Argentine Primera División	19	4	—		—		—		19	4
Belgrano	2015	Argentine Primera División	30	5	1	0	2 (Note: Appearance(s) in Copa Sudamericana)	0	—		33	5
Belgrano	Total		75	10	4	0	2	0	—		81	10
Tigres UANL	2015–16	Liga MX	15	1	—		4 (Note: Appearance(s) in CONCACAF Champions League)	0	1 (Note: Appearance in Campeón de Campeones)	0	20	1
Tigres UANL	2016–17	Liga MX	40	8	—		7	0	1	0	48	8
Tigres UANL	2017–18	Liga MX	21	3	2	0	4	1	2 (Note: One appearance and one goal in Campeón de Campeones, one appearance in Campeones Cup)	1	29	5
Tigres UANL	2018–19	Liga MX	22	5	2	0	2	0	2 (Note: One appearance in Campeón de Campeones, one appearance in Leagues Cup)	0	28	5
Tigres UANL	2019–20	Liga MX	15	4	—		—		—		15	4
Tigres UANL	Total		113	21	4	0	17	1	6	1	140	23
Columbus Crew	2020	MLS	16 (Note: Includes three appearances and two goals in MLS is Back Tournament group stage)	6	—		—		5 (Note: One appearance in MLS is Back Tournament knockout stage, four appearances and two goals in MLS Cup Playoffs)	2	21	8
Columbus Crew	2021	MLS	32	12	—		3	1	1 (Note: Appearance in Campeones Cup)	0	36	13
Columbus Crew	2022	MLS	29	10	0	0	—		—		29	10
Columbus Crew	2023	MLS	20	10	0	0	—		1 (Note: Appearance in Leagues Cup)	1	21	11
Columbus Crew	Total		97	38	0	0	3	1	7	3	107	42
Al-Fateh	2023–24	Saudi Pro League	30	8	2	0	—		—		32	8
Al-Fateh	2024–25	Saudi Pro League	11	1	0	0	—		—		11	1
Al-Fateh	Total		41	9	2	0	—		—		43	9
Career total			324	77	10	0	22	2	13	4	369	83

=== International ===
As of match played 14 October 2025

Appearances and goals by national team and year
National team	Year	Apps	Goals
Armenia	2021	4	0
Armenia	2022	2	0
Armenia	2023	8	3
Armenia	2024	8	2
Armenia	2025	4	0
Total		26	5

Scores and results list Armenia's goal tally first, score column indicates score after each Zelarayán goal.

List of international goals scored by Lucas Zelarayán
No.	Date	Venue	Cap	Opponent	Score	Result	Competition
1	16 June 2023	Cardiff City Stadium, Cardiff, Wales	8	Wales	1–1	4–2	UEFA Euro 2024 qualifying
2	16 June 2023	Cardiff City Stadium, Cardiff, Wales	8	Wales	4–2	4–2	UEFA Euro 2024 qualifying
3	18 November 2023	Vazgen Sargsyan Republican Stadium, Yerevan, Armenia	13	Wales	1–0	1–1	UEFA Euro 2024 qualifying
4	7 September 2024	Vazgen Sargsyan Republican Stadium, Yerevan, Armenia	17	Latvia	3–1	4–1	2024–25 UEFA Nations League C
5	10 October 2024	Tórsvøllur, Tórshavn, Faroe Islands	19	Faroe Islands	1–1	2–2	2024–25 UEFA Nations League C

== Honours ==
UANL

- Liga MX: Apertura 2016, Apertura 2017, Clausura 2019
- Campeón de Campeones: 2016, 2017, 2018
- Campeones Cup: 2018

Columbus Crew

- MLS Cup: 2020
- Campeones Cup: 2021

Belgrano

- Argentine Primera División: Apertura 2026

Individual

- MLS Newcomer of the Year: 2020
- MLS Cup MVP: 2020
- MLS All-Star: 2021, 2023
- MLS Player of the Month: February/March 2022
