= Basil Al-Bahrani =

Saudi Arabian association football player

Basil Al-Bahrani باسل البحراني
Personal information
- Full name: Basil Mohammed Al-Bahrani
- Date of birth: 23 January 1995 (age 31)
- Place of birth: Al-Hasa, Saudi Arabia
- Height: 1.75 m (5 ft 9 in)
- Position: Goalkeeper

Team information
- Current team: Al-Arabi
- Number: 1

Youth career
- Al-Fateh

Senior career*
Years	Team	Apps	(Gls)
2017–2022	Al-Fateh	3	(0)
2022–2024	Al-Batin	3	(0)
2024–	Al-Arabi	0	(0)
- * Club domestic league appearances and goals as of 13 February 2021

Basil Al-Bahrani (Arabic: باسل البحراني, born 23 January 1995) is a Saudi Arabian professional footballer who plays as a goalkeeper for Al-Arabi.

== Career ==
Al-Bahrani began his career at the youth team of Al-Fateh. On 10 August 2017, he was called up to the bench for the first time. On 22 August 2019, Al-Bahrani signed his first professional contract with the club. On 13 January 2021, Al-Bahrani renewed his contract with Al-Fateh. On 13 February 2021, Al-Bahrani made his league debut against Al-Ain. On 28 July 2022, Al-Bahrani was released from his contract by Al-Fateh. On 1 August 2022, Al-Bahrani joined Al-Batin. On 5 August 2024, Al-Bahrani joined Al-Arabi.
