= Ahmed El Geaidy =

Saudi Arabian footballer (born 1996)

Personal information
- Full name: Ahmed Gamal El Geaidy
- Date of birth: October 2, 1996 (age 30)
- Place of birth: Saudi Arabia
- Height: 1.77 m (5 ft 10 in)
- Position: Winger

Team information
- Current team: Al Ahli SC (Wad Madani)

Senior career*
Years	Team	Apps	(Gls)
2015–2017	Ghazl Port Said		
2017–2018	Ismaily	0	(0)
2017–2018	→ Al-Merreikh (loan)		
2018–2019	Al-Raed		
2019	Al-Washm	14	(1)
2019–2020	Ohod	10	(0)
2020	Jeddah	12	(0)
2021	Al-Bukiryah	14	(1)
2021–2022	Al-Fateh	13	(0)
2022–2025	Ghazl El Mahalla		
- * Club domestic league appearances and goals

Ahmed El Geaidy (Arabic: أحمد الجعيدي; born 2 October 1996) is a Saudi Arabian-born Egyptian professional footballer who plays as a winger.

== Club career ==
El Geaidy started his career at Ghazl Port Said before joining Ismaily on 23 May 2017. On 30 August 2017, El Geaidy was loaned out to Al-Merreikh. On 19 July 2018, El Geaidy joined Saudi Arabian side Al-Raed. On 27 January 2019, he was released from the club without making a single appearance. On 6 February 2019, El Geaidy joined Al-Washm. He left the club following their relegation to the Saudi Second Division. On 23 July 2019, El Geaidy joined Ohod. On 16 January 2020, he joined Jeddah and left the club following the conclusion of the 2019–20 season. On 7 February 2021, El Geaidy joined Al-Bukiryah. On 3 June 2021, El Geaidy joined Pro League club Al-Fateh on a one-year contract. He made his debut on 26 August 2021 in the league match against Al-Shabab. He left Al-Fateh following the expiration of his contract on 4 July 2022. On 10 October 2022, El Geaidy joined Egyptian Premier League side Ghazl El Mahalla on a three-year contract.
