= Matheus Machado (footballer, born 2003) =

Brazilian footballer (born 2003)

Personal information
- Full name: Matheus Machado Ferreira
- Date of birth: 13 March 2003 (age 23)
- Place of birth: Porto Alegre, Brazil
- Height: 1.86 m (6 ft 1 in)
- Position: Forward

Team information
- Current team: Zalaegerszegi
- Number: 9

Youth career
- 2015–2021: Grêmio
- 2022: Nacional
- 2022–2023: Khor Fakkan

Senior career*
Years	Team	Apps	(Gls)
2023	Cherno More	15	(6)
2023–2025	Zulte Waregem	30	(9)
2025–2026	Al-Fateh	13	(2)
2025–2026	→ Ludogorets (loan)	10	(0)
2026–	Zalaegerszegi	2	(1)
- * Club domestic league appearances and goals as of 5 June 2026

Matheus Machado Ferreira (born 13 March 2003 in Porto Alegre city) is a Brazilian professional footballer who plays as a forward for Zalaegerszegi.

== Career ==
Born in Porto Alegre, Machado played for Grêmio and Nacional SP in his youth such.

On 17 January 2023, Machado joined Cherno More Varna in Bulgaria. On 21 April, he made his debut for the club in a 2–0 away win over Botev Vratsa. Twelve days later, scored his first goal for Cherno More in his third league appearance for the club, in a 2–2 against Arda Kardzhali.

On 1 September 2023, Machado joined Belgian club Zulte Waregem, for an undisclosed fee believed to be around €500 000.

On 31 January 2025, Machado joined Saudi Arabian club Al-Fateh on a three-and-a-half year deal.

On 31 July 2025, Machado joined Bulgarian First League team Ludogorets Razgrad on a season-long loan, with an option of signing on a permanent basis at the end of the 2025–26 season.

== Career statistics ==
As of 5 December 2025

Appearances and goals by club, season and competition
Club	Season	League			Cup		Continental		Other		Total	
Club	Season	Division	Apps	Goals	Apps	Goals	Apps	Goals	Apps	Goals	Apps	Goals
Cherno More	2022–23	Bulgarian First League	8	2	1	1	–		–		9	3
Cherno More	2023–24	Bulgarian First League	7	4	0	0	–		–		7	4
Cherno More	Total		15	6	1	1	0	0	0	0	16	7
Zulte Waregem	2023–24	Challenger Pro League	24	5	2	0	–		1 (Note: Appearance in Promotion play-off)	0	27	5
Zulte Waregem	2024–25	Challenger Pro League	6	4	1	0	–		–		7	4
Zulte Waregem	Total		30	9	3	0	0	0	1	0	34	9
Al-Fateh	2024–25	Saudi Pro League	13	2	0	0	–		–		13	2
Ludogorets	2025–26	Bulgarian First League	10	0	0	0	5	0	–		15	0
Career total			68	17	4	1	5	0	1	0	78	18
