= Hassan Al-Mohammed =

Saudi Arabian association football player

Personal information
- Full name: Hassan Abdullah Al-Mohammed Saleh
- Date of birth: 2 August 1998 (age 28)
- Place of birth: Al-Omran, Al-Hasa, Saudi Arabia
- Position: Midfielder

Team information
- Current team: Al-Adalah
- Number: 15

Youth career
- –2015: Al-Sawab
- 2015–2018: Hajer

Senior career*
Years	Team	Apps	(Gls)
2018–2021	Hajer	49	(5)
2021–2024	Al-Fateh	8	(0)
2024–	Al-Adalah	0	(0)
- * Club domestic league appearances and goals as of 1 January 2022

Hassan Al-Mohammed (Arabic: حسن المحمد, born 2 August 1998) is a Saudi Arabian professional footballer who plays as a midfielder for Al-Adalah.

== Career ==
Al-Mohammed began his career at the youth team of Al-Sawab. On 9 July 2015, Al-Mohammed joined Hajer. He signed his first professional contract with the club on 30 April 2018. He made his first-team debut during the 2019–20 season in the Saudi Second Division. He made 17 appearances and scored 3 goals as Hajer were crowned Second Division champions. On 17 September 2020, Al-Mohammed renewed his contract with Hajer for another three years. On 4 July 2021, Al-Mohammed joined Pro League side Al-Fateh on a five-year deal. He made his debut on 1 January 2022 in the league match against Al-Nassr.

On 11 July 2024, Al-Mohammed joined First Division side Al-Adalah.

== Honours ==
Hajer

- Saudi Second Division: 2019–20
