= 2021–22 Ettifaq FC season =

Al-Ettifaq
2021–22 season
- President: Khalid Al-Dabal
- Manager: Khaled Al-Atwi (until 16 October); Vladan Milojević (from 17 October until 1 March); Patrice Carteron (from 4 March)
- Stadium: Prince Mohamed bin Fahd Stadium
- SPL: 11th
- King Cup (knocked out by Al-Nassr): Round of 16
- Top goalscorer: League: Naïm Sliti (9 goals); All: Naïm Sliti (9 goals)
- Highest home attendance: 15,670 (vs. Al-Hilal, 11 May 2022)
- Lowest home attendance: 907 (vs. Al-Batin, 14 August 2021)
- Average home league attendance: 6,708
Home colours	Away colours	Third colours
- All statistics correct as of 27 June 2022.

The 2021–22 season was Al-Ettifaq's 43rd non-consecutive season in the Pro League and their 76th season in existence. The club participated in the Pro League and the King Cup.

The season covered the period from 1 July 2021 to 30 June 2022.

== Players ==
=== Squad information ===
As of 1 February 2022

Note: Flags indicate national team as defined under FIFA eligibility rules; some limited exceptions apply. Players may hold more than one non-FIFA nationality.

No.	Pos.	Nation	Player
1	GK	KSA	Abdullah Al-Oaisher
2	DF	KSA	Saeed Al Mowalad
3	DF	KSA	Ali Masrahi
4	DF	KSA	Fahad Ghazi
5	DF	ALG	Ayoub Abdellaoui
6	MF	KSA	Ibrahim Mahnashi
7	MF	KSA	Mohammed Al-Kuwaykibi
8	MF	KSA	Hamed Al-Ghamdi
10	MF	TUN	Naïm Sliti
11	MF	KSA	Ali Hazazi
12	DF	KSA	Sanousi Hawsawi
14	MF	SVK	Filip Kiss
15	MF	KSA	Ahmed Al-Ghamdi
16	MF	KSA	Faisal Al-Ghamdi
17	FW	KSA	Abdullah Al Salem
18	DF	KSA	Abdullah Al-Khateeb

No.	Pos.	Nation	Player
19	FW	KSA	Hassan Al Salis
20	MF	GER	Amin Younes
23	GK	ALG	Raïs M'Bolhi (captain)
24	MF	KSA	Saad Al-Selouli
25	DF	KSA	Saeed Al-Rubaie
26	DF	KSA	Saad Al-Mousa
29	DF	KSA	Fahad Al-Dossari
30	GK	KSA	Abdullah Al-Saleh
35	GK	KSA	Mohammed Al-Haiti
40	MF	KSA	Majed Al-Najrani
42	MF	KSA	Salem Al-Maqadi
43	MF	KSA	Abdulmohsen Al-Dossari
45	MF	KSA	Rakan Al-Kaabi
50	DF	KSA	Saad Al Khayri
77	FW	FRA	Youssouf Niakaté
99	FW	SWE	Robin Quaison

=== Out on loan ===
Note: Flags indicate national team as defined under FIFA eligibility rules; some limited exceptions apply. Players may hold more than one non-FIFA nationality.

No.	Pos.	Nation	Player
9	FW	KSA	Hazaa Al-Hazaa (at Al-Taawoun until 30 June 2022)
27	FW	KSA	Rayan Al-Bloushi (at Al-Fayha until 30 June 2022)
44	DF	KSA	Hamad Al-Sayyaf (at Al-Sahel until 30 June 2022)

No.	Pos.	Nation	Player
90	MF	KSA	Hisham Al-Farhan (at Al-Nojoom until 30 June 2022)
—	DF	KSA	Ahmed Al Muhaimeed (at Al-Jabalain until 30 June 2022)

== Transfers and loans ==
=== Transfers in ===
Entry date	Position	No.	Player	From club	Fee	Ref.
30 June 2021	GK	22	(Saudi Arabia) Abdullah Al-Bahri	(Saudi Arabia) Al-Thoqbah	End of loan	
30 June 2021	DF	3	(Saudi Arabia) Ahmed Al Muhaimeed	(Saudi Arabia) Al-Jabalain	End of loan	
30 June 2021	DF	34	(Saudi Arabia) Ali Al-Khaibari	(Saudi Arabia) Al-Ain	End of loan	
30 June 2021	DF	36	(Saudi Arabia) Hussein Halawani	(Saudi Arabia) Al-Ain	End of loan	
30 June 2021	DF	50	(Saudi Arabia) Saad Al Khayri	(Saudi Arabia) Al-Batin	End of loan	
30 June 2021	MF	47	(Saudi Arabia) Ahmed Al-Dohaim	(Saudi Arabia) Al-Khaleej	End of loan	
30 June 2021	MF	77	(Saudi Arabia) Hassan Ghazwani	(Saudi Arabia) Al-Thoqbah	End of loan	
30 June 2021	MF	90	(Saudi Arabia) Hisham Al-Farhan	(Saudi Arabia) Hajer	End of loan	
30 June 2021	MF	–	(Saudi Arabia) Mohammed Al-Dawsari	(Saudi Arabia) Al-Sahel	End of loan	
30 June 2021	FW	–	(Saudi Arabia) Nawaf Bo Amer	(Saudi Arabia) Al-Nojoom	End of loan	
1 July 2021	DF	2	(Saudi Arabia) Saeed Al Mowalad	(Saudi Arabia) Al-Ahli	Free	
8 July 2021	MF	99	(Sweden) Robin Quaison	(Germany) Mainz	Free	
29 August 2021	DF	5	(Algeria) Ayoub Abdellaoui	(Switzerland) Sion	Free	
31 August 2021	GK	1	(Saudi Arabia) Abdullah Al-Oaisher	(Saudi Arabia) Al-Wehda	Undisclosed	
22 January 2022	FW	77	(France) Youssouf Niakaté	(Saudi Arabia) Al-Ittihad	Free	
23 January 2022	MF	20	(Germany) Amin Younes	(Italy) Napoli	Free	

=== Transfers out ===
Exit date	Position	No.	Player	To club	Fee	Ref.
1 July 2021	DF	17	(Saudi Arabia) Saleh Al-Qumayzi	(Saudi Arabia) Al-Faisaly	Free	
1 July 2021	DF	–	(Tunisia) Oussama Haddadi	(Turkey) Yeni Malatyaspor	$533,000	
1 July 2021	FW	–	(Saudi Arabia) Nawaf Bo Amer	(Saudi Arabia) Al-Adalah	Free	
30 July 2021	MF	47	(Saudi Arabia) Ahmed Al-Dohaim	(Saudi Arabia) Al-Qadsiah	Free	
1 August 2021	DF	5	(Estonia) Karol Mets		Released	
5 August 2021	MF	–	(Saudi Arabia) Mohammed Al-Dawsari	(Saudi Arabia) Al-Jabalain	Free	
11 August 2021	DF	36	(Saudi Arabia) Hussein Halawani	(Saudi Arabia) Al-Wehda	Free	
17 August 2021	FW	39	(Senegal) Souleymane Doukara	(Turkey) Giresunspor	Free	
7 September 2021	GK	22	(Saudi Arabia) Abdullah Al-Bahri	(Saudi Arabia) Bisha	Free	
9 September 2021	DF	34	(Saudi Arabia) Ali Al-Khaibari	(Saudi Arabia) Al-Orobah	Free	
27 January 2022	MF	88	(Brazil) Souza	(United Arab Emirates) Khor Fakkan	Free	
31 January 2022	FW	21	(Morocco) Walid Azaro	(United Arab Emirates) Ajman	Free	

=== Loans out ===
Start date	End date	Position	No.	Player	To club	Fee	Ref.
16 July 2021	End of season	DF	3	(Saudi Arabia) Ahmed Al Muhaimeed	(Saudi Arabia) Al-Jabalain	None	
21 July 2021	End of season	MF	90	(Saudi Arabia) Hisham Al-Farhan	(Saudi Arabia) Al-Nojoom	None	
30 August 2021	End of season	FW	27	(Saudi Arabia) Rayan Al-Bloushi	(Saudi Arabia) Al-Fayha	None	
7 September 2021	31 January 2022	MF	77	(Saudi Arabia) Hassan Ghazwani	(Saudi Arabia) Bisha	None	
26 January 2022	End of season	FW	9	(Saudi Arabia) Hazaa Al-Hazaa	(Saudi Arabia) Al-Taawoun	$266,000	
28 January 2022	End of season	DF	44	(Saudi Arabia) Hamad Al-Sayyaf	(Saudi Arabia) Al-Sahel	None	
31 January 2022	End of season	MF	77	(Saudi Arabia) Hassan Ghazwani	(Saudi Arabia) Al-Sahel	None	

== Pre-season ==
23 July 2021 Friendly	Al-Ettifaq (Saudi Arabia)	1–1	(Hungary) Haladás	Szombathely, Hungary
18:30 CEST	Al-Bloushi 75'	Report	Tóth 7'	Stadium: Haladás Sportkomplexum

26 July 2021 Friendly	Al-Ettifaq (Saudi Arabia)	2–0	(Slovenia) Rogaška	Bad Tatzmannsdorf, Austria
18:30 CEST	Al-Ghamdi 61'; Al-Bloushi 86'	Report		Stadium: AVITA Resort Fussballarena

2 August 2021 Friendly	Al-Ettifaq (Saudi Arabia)	3–0	(Hungary) Zalaegerszegi	Zalaegerszeg, Hungary
CEST	Souza 70'; Al-Hazaa 72'; Azaro 77'	Report		Stadium: ZTE Arena

== Competitions ==
=== Overview ===
Competition	Record							
Competition	G	W	D	L	GF	GA	GD	Win %
Pro League	30	8	10	12	40	47	−7	26.67
King Cup	1	0	0	1	0	1	−1	0.00
Total	31	8	10	13	40	48	−8	25.81

Updated to match played 27 June 2022
Source: Competitions

=== Pro League ===
==== League table ====
Pos	Team	Pld	W	D	L	GF	GA	GD	Pts	Qualification or relegation
9	Abha	30	9	8	13	27	43	−16	35 (Note: Head-to-head points: Al-Fateh 5, Abha 5, Al-Fayha 4. Head-to-head goal difference: Al-Fateh +1, Abha –1.)	
10	Al-Fayha	30	8	11	11	21	24	−3	35	Qualification for AFC Champions League group stage (Note: Al-Fayha qualified for the AFC Champions League play-off round as 2021–22 King Cup winners.)
11	Al-Ettifaq	30	8	10	12	40	47	−7	34 (Note: Head-to-head points: Al-Ettifaq 3, Al-Taawoun 3. Head-to-head goal difference: Al-Ettifaq +2, Al-Taawoun –2.)	
12	Al-Taawoun	30	7	13	10	43	48	−5	34	
13	Al-Batin	30	8	9	13	31	41	−10	33 (Note: Head-to-head points: Al-Batin 4, Al-Faisaly 1.)	

Source: spl.com
Rules for classification: 1) Points; 2) Head-to-head points; 3) Head-to-head goal difference; 4) Total goal difference; 5) Total goals scored; 6) Fair-play points (Note: Head-to-head record is used only after all the matches between the teams in question have been played).

==== Results summary ====
Overall								Home						Away					
Pld	W	D	L	GF	GA	GD	Pts	W	D	L	GF	GA	GD	W	D	L	GF	GA	GD
30	8	10	12	40	47	−7	34	4	5	6	19	22	−3	4	5	6	21	25	−4

Last updated: 27 June 2022.
Source: spl.com.sa

==== Results by round ====
Round	1	2	3	4	5	6	7	8	9	10	11	12	13	14	15	16	17	18	19	20	21	22	23	24	25	26	27	28	29	30
Ground	H	A	A	H	A	A	H	A	A	H	H	A	H	A	H	A	H	H	A	H	H	A	H	H	A	A	H	A	H	A
Result	W	D	D	D	L	L	D	L	W	L	L	W	W	L	D	D	D	L	D	L	L	L	W	D	L	W	W	D	L	W
Position	2	2	6	8	9	11	12	13	12	12	13	10	8	9	10	10	10	10	10	12	14	15	14	14	15	13	11	12	15	11

Updated to match(es) played on 27 June 2022. Source: spl.com.sa
A = Away; H = Home; W = Win; D = Draw; L = Loss

==== Matches ====
All times are local, AST (UTC+3).

Win Draw Loss Postponed

14 August 2021 1	Al-Ettifaq	2–1	Al-Batin	Dammam
18:55	Al Salem 9', 20'	Report	Sami (yellow card) 41'; El Jebli 50' (pen.); Al-Qarni (yellow card) 57'; Obaid (yellow card) 90+5'	Stadium: Prince Mohamed bin Fahd Stadium; Attendance: 907; Referee: Faisal Al-Blwi

21 August 2021 2	Al-Shabab	3–3	Al-Ettifaq	Riyadh
20:50	Ighalo 39', 49'; Banega 45+5' (pen.); Lichnovsky (red card) 87'	Report	Azaro 77'; Quaison 80' (pen.); Al-Mowalad (yellow card) 84'; Mahnashi 88'; Al-Dossari (yellow card) 90+1'	Stadium: King Fahd International Stadium; Attendance: 6,113; Referee: Khaled Al-Teris

26 August 2021 3	Abha	1–1	Al-Ettifaq	Abha
19:05	te Vrede 90+3'	Report	Quaison 9'; Kiss (yellow card) 33'; Al Salem (yellow card) 77'	Stadium: Prince Sultan bin Abdul Aziz Stadium; Attendance: 499; Referee: Mohammed Al-Harbi

12 September 2021 4	Al-Ettifaq	2–2	Al-Raed	Khobar
18:30	Quaison 14'; Al-Rubaie (yellow card) 27'; Kiss 65'; Al-Dossari (yellow card) 90+4'	Report	R. Al-Ghamdi (yellow card) 11'; El Berkaoui 23'; Al-Zain 52'; Fouzair (yellow card) 90+2'	Stadium: Prince Saud bin Jalawi Stadium; Attendance: 3,485; Referee: Mohammed Al-Qarni

18 September 2021 5	Al-Hilal	3–2	Al-Ettifaq	Riyadh
18:30	Marega 24'; Gomis 56', 61'; Pereira (yellow card) 90'; Al-Mayouf (yellow card) 90+5'	Report	Al-Hazaa 69'; Al-Rubaie (yellow card) 74'; Hawsawi 84'	Stadium: Prince Faisal bin Fahd Stadium; Attendance: 6,580; Referee: Salman Falahi (Qatar)

23 September 2021 6	Al-Tai	4–2	Al-Ettifaq	Ha'il
18:45	Al-Harabi 28'; Malele 34', 77'; Marcelo 66'	Report	Souza 21', 41'	Stadium: Prince Abdul Aziz bin Musa'ed Stadium; Attendance: 5,094; Referee: Sultan Al-Harbi

30 September 2021 7	Al-Ettifaq	0–0	Al-Fateh	Khobar
20:20		Report	Al-Fuhaid (yellow card) 29'; Lajami (yellow card) 66'; Boushal (yellow card) 90+4'	Stadium: Prince Saud bin Jalawi Stadium; Attendance: 4,377; Referee: Abdullah Al-Shehri

16 October 2021 8	Al-Ahli	4–0	Al-Ettifaq	Jeddah
20:10	Al Somah 22' (pen.); Al-Majhad (yellow card) 39'; Bradarić 47', 58'; Ghareeb 68'	Report	Al-Rubaie (yellow card) 56'; Azaro (yellow card) 82'	Stadium: Prince Abdullah Al-Faisal Stadium; Attendance: 9,679; Referee: Khaled Al-Teris

24 October 2021 9	Al-Nassr	0–1	Al-Ettifaq	Riyadh
18:00	Al-Najei (yellow card) 36'; Al-Amri (yellow card) 38'; S. Al-Ghanam (yellow card) 45+1'; Hamdallah (yellow card) 48'; Talisca (yellow card) 86'	Report	Kiss (yellow card) 64', (goal) 75' (pen.); Al-Rubaie (yellow card) 68'; M'Bolhi (yellow card) 88'	Stadium: Mrsool Park; Attendance: 16,458; Referee: István Kovács (Romania)

30 October 2021 10	Al-Ettifaq	0–1	Damac	Khobar
17:40	Kiss (yellow card) 87'	Report	Zeghba (yellow card) 42'; Al-Ammar 68'; Augusto (red card) 85'	Stadium: Prince Saud bin Jalawi Stadium; Attendance: 7,328; Referee: Sultan Al-Harbi

4 November 2021 11	Al-Ettifaq	1–3	Al-Taawoun	Khobar
19:00	Sliti 23'; Al-Mowalad (yellow card) 79'; Al-Hazaa (yellow card) 83'	Report	Santos 2'; Manoel (red card) 8'; Kaku (yellow card) 43'; Al-Oyayari 66', (yellow card) 71'; Hazazi (yellow card) 78'; Al-Bakr (yellow card) 86'; Tawamba 90+3'	Stadium: Prince Saud bin Jalawi Stadium; Attendance: 6,258; Referee: Majed Al-Shamrani

21 November 2021 12	Al-Hazem	0–3	Al-Ettifaq	Ar Rass
15:15		Report	Al-Mowalad (yellow card) 16'; Quaison 45+2'; Azaro 84'; Kiss 87'	Stadium: Al-Hazem Club Stadium; Attendance: 1,632; Referee: Shukri Al-Hanfoush

27 November 2021 13	Al-Ettifaq	1–0	Al-Faisaly	Khobar
17:25	Al-Rubaie (yellow card) 21'; Sliti (yellow card) 49', (goal) 50'; Hazazi (yellow card) 63'; Mahnashi (yellow card) 78'	Report	Al-Ahmed (yellow card) 32'	Stadium: Prince Saud bin Jalawi Stadium; Attendance: 6,783; Referee: Khaled Salwi

26 December 2021 14	Al-Ittihad	3–2	Al-Ettifaq	Jeddah
19:45	Coronado (yellow card) 54'; Camara 71', 85'; Al-Aboud (yellow card) 78'; Al-Sahafi 82', (yellow card) 87'; El Ahmadi (yellow card) 90+4'	Report	Al-Sahafi 29' (o.g.); Mahnashi (yellow card) 36'; M'Bolhi (yellow card) 39'; Quaison 41', (yellow card) 57'; Azaro (yellow card) 81'	Stadium: King Abdullah Sports City; Attendance: 32,740; Referee: István Kovács (Romania)

31 December 2021 15	Al-Ettifaq	1–1	Al-Fayha	Dammam
17:35	Sliti 84'; Al-Rubaie (yellow card) 90+5'	Report	Al-Abdulmenem 33'; Al-Baqawi (yellow card) 90+5'	Stadium: Prince Mohamed bin Fahd Stadium; Attendance: 3,722; Referee: Sultan Al-Harbi

7 January 2022 16	Al-Batin	0–0	Al-Ettifaq	Hafar al-Batin
15:20	M. Al-Qarni (yellow card) 18'; El Jebli (yellow card) 58'	Report	Abdellaoui (yellow card) 71'; Al-Rubaie (yellow card) 90+1'	Stadium: Al-Batin Club Stadium; Attendance: 2,300; Referee: Khaled Al-Teris

14 January 2022 17	Al-Ettifaq	2–2	Al-Shabab	Dammam
17:50	Souza 33'; Kiss 37'	Report	Al-Qahtani (yellow card) 22'; Banega (yellow card) 45+2'; Sharahili 60'; Carlos 64'	Stadium: Prince Mohamed bin Fahd Stadium; Attendance: 8,190; Referee: Majed Al-Shamrani

20 January 2022 18	Al-Ettifaq	1–2	Abha	Dammam
18:00	H. Al-Ghamdi (yellow card) 34'; Al-Mowalad (yellow card) 85'; Al Salis (red card) 90+4'; Al Salem 90+8'	Report	Al-Amri (yellow card) 29', (goal) 81'; Amr 37'; Mhamdi (yellow card) 67'	Stadium: Prince Mohamed bin Fahd Stadium; Attendance: 2,815; Referee: Shukri Al-Hanfoush

5 February 2022 19	Al-Raed	1–1	Al-Ettifaq	Buraidah
15:50	Fouzair (yellow card) 36'; El Berkaoui 75'; Al-Fahad (yellow card) 90+2'	Report	Mahnashi (yellow card) 39'; Al-Kuwaykibi (red card) 48'; Kiss 90+4' (pen.); Ghazi (yellow card) 90+7'	Stadium: King Abdullah Sport City Stadium; Attendance: 2,770; Referee: Mohammed Al-Qarni

19 February 2022 21	Al-Ettifaq	0–1	Al-Tai	Dammam
18:10	Al-Rubaie (yellow card) 86'	Report	Figueroa 10'; Sayoud (yellow card) 26'; Al-Aqel (yellow card) 83'	Stadium: Prince Mohamed bin Fahd Stadium; Attendance: 5,380; Referee: Majed Al-Shamrani

27 February 2022 22	Al-Fateh	4–0	Al-Ettifaq	Al-Hasa
18:15	Cueva 10', 33'; Bendebka 37'; Lajami (yellow card) 50'; Al-Fuhaid (yellow card) 53'; Batna 85' (pen.)	Report		Stadium: Prince Abdullah bin Jalawi Stadium; Attendance: 8,374; Referee: Mohammed Al-Hoaish

4 March 2022 23	Al-Ettifaq	1–0	Al-Ahli	Dammam
20:45	Sliti 19'; Al Salem (red card) 71'	Report	Majrashi (yellow card) 28'; Asiri (yellow card) 74'; Al-Mogren (yellow card) 90+6'	Stadium: Prince Mohamed bin Fahd Stadium; Attendance: 6,757; Referee: Faisal Al-Blwi

11 March 2022 24	Al-Ettifaq	2–2	Al-Nassr	Dammam
20:45	Al-Kuwaykibi (yellow card) 20', (goal) 28'; Quaison 35', (yellow card) 39' (yellow-red card) 90+3'; Ghazi (yellow card) 42' (yellow-red card) 85'; Hawsawi (red card) 45+2'; Al-Rubaie (yellow card) 77'	Report	Masharipov (yellow card) 34'; Anselmo (yellow card) 41'; Al-Khateeb 51' (o.g.); Martínez 62'; Lajami (yellow card) 90+2'; Al-Amri (yellow card) 90+2'	Stadium: Prince Mohamed bin Fahd Stadium; Attendance: 11,379; Referee: Majed Al-Shamrani

17 March 2022 25	Damac	1–0	Al-Ettifaq	Abha
18:55	Al-Nakhli (yellow card) 40'; Soudani 41'; Munshi (yellow card) 47'; Nono (yellow card) 55'	Report	Al-Khateeb (yellow card) 38'; Younes (red card) 58'; Al-Rubaie (yellow card) 69'	Stadium: Prince Sultan bin Abdul Aziz Stadium; Attendance: 3,764; Referee: Ahmed Al-Rumaikhani

5 May 2022 26	Al-Taawoun	0–4	Al-Ettifaq	Buraidah
19:20	Luyindama (yellow card) 45+3'; Fathi (yellow card) 46'; Al-Nabit (yellow card) 87'; Al-Sobhi (yellow card) 90+1'	Report	Mahnashi (yellow card) 44'; Sliti 49', 61'; Hazazi (yellow card) 53'; Niakaté 75'; Abdellaoui (yellow card) 82'; Al-Kuwaykibi 90+2' (pen.)	Stadium: King Abdullah Sport City Stadium; Attendance: 4,053; Referee: Sergei Karasev (Russia)

11 May 2022 20	Al-Ettifaq	0–2	Al-Hilal	Dammam
18:55	Al-Kuwaykibi (yellow card) 56'	Report	Al-Bulaihi 30'; Ighalo 51' (pen.)	Stadium: Prince Mohamed bin Fahd Stadium; Attendance: 15,670; Referee: Fernando Rapallini (Argentina)

21 May 2022 27	Al-Ettifaq	5–2	Al-Hazem	Dammam
19:00	Abdellaoui (yellow card) 16'; Quaison 30'; Younes 42'; Sliti 54', 56', (yellow card) 74'; Al-Khateeb (yellow card) 67'; Mahnashi (yellow card) 90+4'; A. Al-Ghamdi 90+5'	Report	Faqihi 45+3', (yellow card) 50'; John 77' (pen.)	Stadium: Prince Mohamed bin Fahd Stadium; Attendance: 4,396; Referee: Khaled Al-Teris

28 May 2022 28	Al-Faisaly	1–1	Al-Ettifaq	Al Majma'ah
19:20	Al-Amri (yellow card) 22'; Al-Ahmed 35', (yellow card) 56'; Ismael (yellow card) 78'	Report	Al-Mowalad (yellow card) 66'; Al-Kuwaykibi (yellow card) 78'; Sliti 90+3'	Stadium: Al Majma'ah Sports City; Attendance: 6,410; Referee: Anastasios Sidiropoulos (Greece)

23 June 2022 29	Al-Ettifaq	1–3	Al-Ittihad	Dammam
21:00	Abdellaoui (yellow card) 50'; Younes 58'; Kiss (red card) 90+6'	Report	Romarinho 73' (pen.), 74'; André (yellow card) 78'; Al-Nashri (yellow card) 82'; Hamdallah 87'	Stadium: Prince Mohamed bin Fahd Stadium; Attendance: 13,172; Referee: César Arturo Ramos (Mexico)

27 June 2022 30	Al-Fayha	0–1	Al-Ettifaq	Al Majma'ah
21:00	Al-Shuwaish (yellow card) 3'; Al-Baqawi (yellow card) 68'	Report	Quaison (yellow card) 47'; Al-Kuwaykibi 57'; Al Salem (yellow card) 88'; M'Bolhi (yellow card) 90+2'	Stadium: Al Majma'ah Sports City; Attendance: 6,284; Referee: Sultan Al-Harbi

=== King Cup ===
All times are local, AST (UTC+3).

21 December 2021 Round of 16	Al-Nassr	1–0	Al-Ettifaq	Riyadh
17:50	Yahya (yellow card) 33'; Al-Amri (yellow card) 43'; K. Al-Ghannam 50'; Anselmo (yellow card) 81'; Al-Shammari (yellow card) 90+1'	Report	Al-Rubaie (yellow card) 19' (yellow-red card) 27'; Al-Mowalad (yellow card) 45+2'	Stadium: Mrsool Park; Referee: Szymon Marciniak (Poland)

== Statistics ==
=== Appearances ===
Last updated on 27 June 2022.

No.	Pos	Nat	Player	Total		Pro League		King Cup	
No.	Pos	Nat	Player	Apps	Goals	Apps	Goals	Apps	Goals
Goalkeepers
1	GK	(Saudi Arabia) KSA	Abdullah Al-Oaisher	3	0	3	0	0	0
23	GK	(Algeria) ALG	Raïs M'Bolhi	28	0	27	0	1	0
35	GK	(Saudi Arabia) KSA	Mohammed Al-Haiti	0	0	0	0	0	0
Defenders
2	DF	(Saudi Arabia) KSA	Saeed Al Mowalad	29	0	28	0	1	0
3	DF	(Saudi Arabia) KSA	Ali Masrahi	0	0	0	0	0	0
4	DF	(Saudi Arabia) KSA	Fahad Ghazi	4	0	4	0	0	0
5	DF	(Algeria) ALG	Ayoub Abdellaoui	23	0	19+3	0	0+1	0
12	DF	(Saudi Arabia) KSA	Sanousi Hawsawi	25	1	17+7	1	1	0
18	DF	(Saudi Arabia) KSA	Abdullah Al-Khateeb	22	0	18+3	0	1	0
25	DF	(Saudi Arabia) KSA	Saeed Al-Rubaie	26	0	23+2	0	1	0
26	DF	(Saudi Arabia) KSA	Saad Al-Mousa	0	0	0	0	0	0
29	DF	(Saudi Arabia) KSA	Fahad Al-Dossari	5	0	0+5	0	0	0
50	DF	(Saudi Arabia) KSA	Saad Al Khayri	6	0	1+5	0	0	0
Midfielders
6	MF	(Saudi Arabia) KSA	Ibrahim Mahnashi	22	1	15+6	1	0+1	0
7	MF	(Saudi Arabia) KSA	Mohammed Al-Kuwaykibi	18	3	17+1	3	0	0
8	MF	(Saudi Arabia) KSA	Hamed Al-Ghamdi	24	0	7+16	0	1	0
10	MF	(Tunisia) TUN	Naïm Sliti	23	9	18+4	9	0+1	0
11	MF	(Saudi Arabia) KSA	Ali Hazazi	27	0	24+2	0	1	0
14	MF	(Slovakia) SVK	Filip Kiss	28	5	27+1	5	0	0
15	MF	(Saudi Arabia) KSA	Ahmed Al-Ghamdi	13	1	1+12	1	0	0
16	MF	(Saudi Arabia) KSA	Faisal Al-Ghamdi	2	0	1+1	0	0	0
20	MF	(Germany) GER	Amin Younes	9	2	8+1	2	0	0
24	MF	(Saudi Arabia) KSA	Saad Al-Selouli	8	0	3+5	0	0	0
40	MF	(Saudi Arabia) KSA	Majed Al-Najrani	4	0	0+4	0	0	0
42	MF	(Saudi Arabia) KSA	Salem Al-Maqaadi	0	0	0	0	0	0
43	MF	(Saudi Arabia) KSA	Abdulmohsen Al-Dossari	0	0	0	0	0	0
45	MF	(Saudi Arabia) KSA	Rakan Kaabi	0	0	0	0	0	0
Forwards
17	FW	(Saudi Arabia) KSA	Abdullah Al Salem	21	3	9+11	3	0+1	0
19	FW	(Saudi Arabia) KSA	Hassan Al Salis	7	0	0+7	0	0	0
77	FW	(France) FRA	Youssouf Niakaté	9	1	3+6	1	0	0
99	FW	(Sweden) SWE	Robin Quaison	22	7	19+2	7	1	0
Players sent out on loan this season
9	FW	(Saudi Arabia) KSA	Hazaa Al-Hazaa	15	1	4+10	1	1	0
27	FW	(Saudi Arabia) KSA	Rayan Al-Bloushi	0	0	0	0	0	0
44	DF	(Saudi Arabia) KSA	Hamad Al-Sayyaf	0	0	0	0	0	0
Player who made an appearance this season but have left the club
21	FW	(Morocco) MAR	Walid Azaro	18	2	16+1	2	1	0
22	GK	(Saudi Arabia) KSA	Abdullah Al-Bahri	0	0	0	0	0	0
88	MF	(Brazil) BRA	Souza	19	3	18	3	1	0

=== Goalscorers ===
Rank	No.	Pos	Nat	Name	Pro League	King Cup	Total
1	10	MF	(Tunisia)	Naïm Sliti	9	0	9
2	99	FW	(Sweden)	Robin Quaison	7	0	7
3	14	MF	(Slovakia)	Filip Kiss	5	0	5
4	7	MF	(Saudi Arabia)	Mohammed Al-Kuwaykibi	3	0	3
4	17	FW	(Saudi Arabia)	Abdullah Al Salem	3	0	3
4	88	MF	(Brazil)	Souza	3	0	3
7	20	MF	(Germany)	Amin Younes	2	0	2
7	21	FW	(Morocco)	Walid Azaro	2	0	2
9	6	MF	(Saudi Arabia)	Ibrahim Mahnashi	1	0	1
9	9	FW	(Saudi Arabia)	Hazaa Al-Hazaa	1	0	1
9	12	DF	(Saudi Arabia)	Sanousi Hawsawi	1	0	1
9	15	MF	(Saudi Arabia)	Ahmed Al-Ghamdi	1	0	1
9	77	FW	(France)	Youssouf Niakaté	1	0	1
Own goal					1	0	1
Total					40	0	40

Last Updated: 27 June 2022

=== Assists ===
Rank	No.	Pos	Nat	Name	Pro League	King Cup	Total
1	21	FW	(Morocco)	Walid Azaro	5	0	5
2	7	MF	(Saudi Arabia)	Mohammed Al-Kuwaykibi	4	0	4
2	88	MF	(Brazil)	Souza	4	0	4
4	2	DF	(Saudi Arabia)	Saeed Al Mowalad	3	0	3
4	8	MF	(Saudi Arabia)	Hamed Al-Ghamdi	3	0	3
4	11	MF	(Saudi Arabia)	Ali Hazazi	3	0	3
7	10	MF	(Tunisia)	Naïm Sliti	2	0	2
7	99	FW	(Sweden)	Robin Quaison	2	0	2
9	25	DF	(Saudi Arabia)	Saeed Al-Rubaie	1	0	1
Total					27	0	27

Last Updated: 27 June 2022

=== Clean sheets ===
Rank	No.	Pos	Nat	Name	Pro League	King Cup	Total
1	23	GK	(Algeria)	Raïs M'Bolhi	7	0	7
2	1	GK	(Saudi Arabia)	Abdullah Al-Oaisher	1	0	1
Total					8	0	8

Last Updated: 27 June 2022
