= 2020–21 Ettifaq FC season =

Al-Ettifaq
2020–21 season
- President: Khalid Al Dabal
- Manager: Khaled Al-Atwi
- Stadium: Prince Mohamed bin Fahd Stadium
- SPL: 5th
- King Cup: Round of 16 (knocked out by Al-Faisaly)
- Top goalscorer: League: Naïm Sliti; Walid Azaro (9 goals each); All: Naïm Sliti; Walid Azaro (9 goals each)
- Highest home attendance: 866 (vs. Al-Raed, 25 May 2021)
Home colours	Away colours
- All statistics correct as of 30 May 2021.

The 2020–21 season was Al-Ettifaq's 42nd non-consecutive season in the Pro League and their 75th season in existence. The club participated in the Pro League and the King Cup.

The season covered the period from 22 September 2020 to 30 June 2021.

== Players ==
=== Squad information ===
As of 1 February 2021

Note: Flags indicate national team as defined under FIFA eligibility rules; some limited exceptions apply. Players may hold more than one non-FIFA nationality.

No.	Pos.	Nation	Player
2	DF	KSA	Ali Masrahi
4	DF	KSA	Fahad Ghazi
5	DF	EST	Karol Mets
6	MF	KSA	Ibrahim Mahnashi
7	MF	KSA	Mohammed Al-Kwikbi
8	MF	KSA	Hamed Al-Ghamdi
9	FW	KSA	Hazaa Al-Hazaa
10	MF	TUN	Naïm Sliti
11	MF	KSA	Ali Hazazi
12	DF	KSA	Sanousi Hawsawi
14	MF	SVK	Filip Kiss
15	MF	KSA	Ahmed Al-Ghamdi
16	MF	KSA	Faisel Al-Ghamdi
17	DF	KSA	Saleh Al-Qumaizi
18	DF	KSA	Abdullah Al-Khateeb
19	FW	KSA	Hassan Al Salis

No.	Pos.	Nation	Player
20	MF	BRA	Souza
21	FW	MAR	Walid Azaro
23	GK	ALG	Raïs M'Bolhi (captain)
24	MF	KSA	Saad Al-Selouli
25	DF	KSA	Saeed Al-Robeai
27	FW	KSA	Abdullah Al-Salem
29	MF	KSA	Fahad Al-Dossari
30	GK	KSA	Abdullah Al-Saleh
32	FW	KSA	Rayan Al-Bloushi
33	DF	KSA	Hamad Al-Sayyaf
34	DF	KSA	Ali Al-Khaibari
35	GK	KSA	Mohammed Al-Haiti
36	DF	KSA	Hussein Halawani
39	FW	SEN	Souleymane Doukara
40	MF	KSA	Majed Al-Najrani

=== Out on loan ===
Note: Flags indicate national team as defined under FIFA eligibility rules; some limited exceptions apply. Players may hold more than one non-FIFA nationality.

No.	Pos.	Nation	Player
3	DF	KSA	Ahmed Al Muhaimeed (at Al-Jabalain until 30 June 2021)
16	MF	KSA	Mohammed Al-Dawsari (at Al-Sahel until 30 June 2021)
22	GK	KSA	Abdullah Al Bahri (at Al-Thoqbah until 30 June 2021)
47	MF	KSA	Ahmed Al-Dohaim (at Al-Khaleej until 30 June 2021)
50	DF	KSA	Saad Al-Khairi (at Al-Batin until 30 June 2021)

No.	Pos.	Nation	Player
77	MF	KSA	Hassan Ghazwani (at Al-Thoqbah until 30 June 2021)
90	MF	KSA	Hisham Al-Farhan (at Hajer until 30 June 2021)
—	DF	TUN	Oussama Haddadi (at Kasımpaşa until 30 June 2021)
—	FW	KSA	Nawaf Bouamer (at Al-Nojoom until 30 June 2021)

== Transfers and loans ==
=== Transfers in ===
Entry date	Position	No.	Player	From club	Fee	Ref.
22 September 2020	DF	12	(Saudi Arabia) Sanousi Hawsawi	(Saudi Arabia) Al-Jabalain	Free	
22 September 2020	DF	36	(Saudi Arabia) Hussein Halawani	(Saudi Arabia) Najran	Undisclosed	
22 September 2020	FW	19	(Saudi Arabia) Hassan Al Salis	(Saudi Arabia) Al-Taraji	Free	
11 October 2020	DF	5	(Estonia) Karol Mets	(Sweden) AIK	$450,000	
16 October 2020	FW	21	(Morocco) Walid Azaro	(Egypt) Al Ahly	$1,200,000	

=== Transfers out ===
Exit date	Position	No.	Player	To club	Fee	Ref.
22 September 2020	DF	12	(Saudi Arabia) Hussain Qassem	(Saudi Arabia) Al-Faisaly	Free	
22 September 2020	DF	26	(Saudi Arabia) Khaled Al-Barakah	(Saudi Arabia) Al-Ahli	End of loan	
22 September 2020	MF	29	(Saudi Arabia) Mohammad Al-Subaie	(Saudi Arabia) Al-Raed	Free	
28 September 2020	MF	15	(Saudi Arabia) Saleh Al-Amri	(Saudi Arabia) Abha	Undisclosed	
2 October 2020	FW	28	(Chad) Maher Sharoma	(Saudi Arabia) Al-Khaleej	Free	
13 October 2020	DF	93	(Saudi Arabia) Omar Al-Sonain		Released	
14 October 2020	MF	27	(Saudi Arabia) Fawaz Al-Torais	(Saudi Arabia) Al-Hilal	$1,335,000	
26 October 2020	MF	–	(Saudi Arabia) Abdulaziz Majrashi	(Saudi Arabia) Damac	Free	
2 February 2021	DF	18	(Central African Republic) Cédric Yambéré	(Belgium) R.W.D. Molenbeek	Free	

=== Loans out ===
Start date	End date	Position	No.	Player	To club	Fee	Ref.
25 September 2020	End of season	DF	3	(Saudi Arabia) Ahmed Al Muhaimeed	(Saudi Arabia) Al-Jabalain	None	
25 September 2020	End of season	DF	50	(Saudi Arabia) Saad Al Khairi	(Saudi Arabia) Al-Batin	None	
26 September 2020	End of season	MF	77	(Saudi Arabia) Hassan Ghazwani	(Saudi Arabia) Al-Thoqbah	None	
26 September 2020	End of season	MF	90	(Saudi Arabia) Hisham Al-Farhan	(Saudi Arabia) Hajer	None	
26 September 2020	End of season	FW	–	(Saudi Arabia) Nawaf Bouamer	(Saudi Arabia) Al-Nojoom	None	
27 September 2020	End of season	MF	–	(Saudi Arabia) Mohammed Al-Dossari	(Saudi Arabia) Al-Sahel	None	
1 October 2020	End of season	MF	47	(Saudi Arabia) Ahmed Al-Dohaim	(Saudi Arabia) Al-Khaleej	None	
23 October 2020	End of season	GK	22	(Saudi Arabia) Abdullah Al-Bahri	(Saudi Arabia) Al-Thoqbah	None	
7 February 2021	End of season	DF	34	(Saudi Arabia) Ali Al-Khaibari	(Saudi Arabia) Al-Ain	None	
7 February 2021	End of season	DF	36	(Saudi Arabia) Hussein Halawani	(Saudi Arabia) Al-Ain	None	

== Pre-season ==
2 October 2020 Friendly	Al-Ettifaq (Saudi Arabia)	4–1	(Saudi Arabia) Al-Thoqbah	Dammam, Saudi Arabia
18:00 AST	Al Salem; Al-Ghamdi; Doukara	Report	Goal	Stadium: Al-Ettifaq Club Stadium

9 October 2020 Friendly	Al-Ettifaq (Saudi Arabia)	1–3	(Saudi Arabia) Al-Batin	Dammam, Saudi Arabia
18:15 AST	Al-Kwikbi 15', 73'; Al-Hazaa 68'	Report	Sharahili 62'	Stadium: Al-Ettifaq Club Stadium

== Competitions ==
=== Overview ===
Competition	Record							
Competition	G	W	D	L	GF	GA	GD	Win %
Pro League	30	14	5	11	50	48	+2	46.67
King Cup	1	0	1	0	0	0	+0	0.00
Total	31	14	6	11	50	48	+2	45.16

Updated to match played 30 May 2021
Source: Competitions

=== Pro League ===
==== League table ====
Pos	Team	Pld	W	D	L	GF	GA	GD	Pts	Qualification or relegation
3	Al-Ittihad (Note: Al-Ittihad cannot qualify for Asian Football Confederation competitions as they did not obtain an AFC license.)	30	15	11	4	45	29	+16	56	
4	Al-Taawoun	30	13	8	9	42	30	+12	47 (Note: Positions determined by head-to-head points: Al-Taawoun 4 pts; Al-Ettifaq 1 pt.)	Qualification for AFC Champions League play-off round
5	Al-Ettifaq	30	14	5	11	50	48	+2	47	
6	Al-Nassr	30	13	7	10	53	40	+13	46	
7	Al-Fateh	30	12	6	12	55	55	0	42	

Source: spl.com source=إحصائيات رابطة دوري المحترفين السعودي 2020-2021
Rules for classification: 1) Points; 2) Head-to-head points; 3) Head-to-head goal difference; 4) Total goal difference; 5) Total goals scored; 6) Fair-play points (Note: Head-to-head record is used only after all the matches between the teams in question have been played).

==== Results summary ====
Overall								Home						Away					
Pld	W	D	L	GF	GA	GD	Pts	W	D	L	GF	GA	GD	W	D	L	GF	GA	GD
30	14	5	11	50	48	+2	47	7	2	6	25	26	−1	7	3	5	25	22	+3

Last updated: 30 May 2021.
Source: spl.com.sa

==== Results by round ====
Round	1	2	3	4	5	6	7	8	9	10	11	12	13	14	15	16	17	18	19	20	21	22	23	24	25	26	27	28	29	30
Ground	A	H	A	H	H	A	A	H	A	A	H	A	H	A	H	H	A	H	A	A	H	H	A	H	H	A	H	A	H	A
Result	W	W	L	L	L	D	D	W	W	W	L	L	D	W	L	W	L	W	L	W	L	D	D	W	L	W	W	L	W	W
Position	3	1	5	8	11	12	12	10	6	4	7	9	8	6	7	6	7	5	6	5	6	6	7	6	6	5	6	6	6	5

Updated to match(es) played on 30 May 2021. Source: spl.com.sa
A = Away; H = Home; W = Win; D = Draw; L = Loss

==== Matches ====
All times are local, AST (UTC+3).

Win Draw Loss Postponed

18 October 2020 1	Al-Ittihad	1–2	Al-Ettifaq	Jeddah
20:00	Al-Muwallad 60' (pen.); Grohe (yellow card) 79'	Report	Kiss (yellow card) 7', (goal) 80' (pen.), 88' (pen.)	Stadium: King Abdullah Sports City; Attendance: 0 Referee: Turki Al-Khudhayr

24 October 2020 2	Al-Ettifaq	2–1	Al-Ain	Dammam
17:40	Sliti 12'; M'Bolhi (yellow card) 47'; Kiss (yellow card) 58'; H. Al-Ghamdi (yellow card) 86'; Mahnashi 89'	Report	Taïder 48' (pen.); Moutari (yellow card) 58'	Stadium: Prince Mohamed bin Fahd Stadium; Attendance: 0 Referee: Mohammed Al-Qarni

31 October 2020 3	Abha	3–2	Al-Ettifaq	Abha
18:15	Aouadhi (yellow card) 19'; Strandberg 24'; Goodwin 39'; Tahrat (yellow card) 59'; Sharahili (yellow card) 62' (yellow-red card) 84'; Afaneh 72'	Report	Al-Qumaizi (red card) 11'; M'Bolhi (yellow card) 17'; Souza (yellow card) 65'; H. Al-Ghamdi 80'; Al Salem 90+2'	Stadium: Prince Sultan bin Abdul Aziz Stadium; Attendance: 0 Referee: Faisal Al-Blwi

6 November 2020 4	Al-Ettifaq	0–2	Al-Hilal	Khobar
17:30		Report	Al-Dawsari 25'; Carrillo 63'	Stadium: Prince Saud bin Jalawi Stadium; Attendance: 0 Referee: Khaled Al-Teris

24 November 2020 5	Al-Ettifaq	0–4	Al-Fateh	Dammam
19:30	Al-Khateeb (yellow card) 62'; Al-Qumaizi (yellow card) 70'; Mahnashi (yellow card) 90'	Report	Bendebka 17' (pen.); Boushal 30'; Al-Saeed (yellow card) 34'; Al-Zaqaan 37', 63'; Buhimed (yellow card) 90+2'	Stadium: Prince Mohamed bin Fahd Stadium; Attendance: 0 Referee: Majed Al-Shamrani

29 November 2020 6	Al-Taawoun	1–1	Al-Ettifaq	Buraidah
15:15	Al-Robeai 13' (o.g.); Santos (yellow card) 59'; Tawamba (yellow card) 80'	Report	Al-Robeai (yellow card) 26'; Kiss 44' (pen.), (yellow card) 67'	Stadium: King Abdullah Sport City Stadium; Attendance: 0 Referee: Mohammed Al-Hoaish

7 December 2020 7	Al-Nassr	2–2	Al-Ettifaq	Riyadh
19:45	Maicon (yellow card) 45+8'; Kim Jin-su (yellow card) 53'; Al-Najei 89'; Hamdallah 90+10' (pen.)	Report	Al-Khateeb (yellow card) 7'; Kiss 45+9' (pen.), (yellow card) 59'; Sliti (yellow card) 49', (goal) 51'; M'Bolhi (yellow card) 90+2'; Al-Kwikbi (yellow card) 90+3'	Stadium: King Fahd International Stadium; Attendance: 0 Referee: Mohammed Al-Nuhait

12 December 2020 8	Al-Ettifaq	4–2	Damac	Dammam
17:25	Sliti 37', 39'; Al-Kwikbi 79'; H. Al-Ghamdi 85'	Report	Zelaya 45+1' (pen.), 90+4'; Abdullah (yellow card) 90'	Stadium: Prince Mohamed bin Fahd Stadium; Attendance: 0 Referee: Khaled Salwi

22 December 2020 9	Al-Faisaly	0–3	Al-Ettifaq	Al Majma'ah
17:50	Qassem (yellow card) 39'; Merkel (yellow card) 43'; Silva (yellow card) 74'; Rossi (yellow card) 90+7'; Guilherme (yellow card) 90+7'	Report	Sliti 24'; Kiss 69' (pen.); Al-Ghamdi (yellow card) 90'; Azaro 90+5'	Stadium: Al Majma'ah Sports City; Attendance: 0 Referee: Turki Al-Khudhayr

27 December 2020 10	Al-Qadsiah	1–2	Al-Ettifaq	Khobar
19:40	Al-Amri 43' (pen.); Al-Yami (yellow card) 50'; Al-Muwallad (yellow card) 57'; Al-Shangeati (yellow card) 73'; Stanley (yellow card) 81'	Report	Doukara 25'; Souza (yellow card) 28'; Kiss (yellow card) 42'; Hazazi 52'; Hawsawi (yellow card) 63'	Stadium: Prince Saud bin Jalawi Stadium; Attendance: 0 Referee: Faisal Al-Blwi

1 January 2021 11	Al-Ettifaq	1–2	Al-Wehda	Dammam
17:35	Kiss 68' (pen.)	Report	Niakaté 52', 89'; Al-Eisa (yellow card) 53'; Botía (yellow card) 59'; Kariri (yellow card) 75'; Al Hejji (yellow card) 90+4'; Al-Owaishir (yellow card) 90+6'	Stadium: Prince Mohamed bin Fahd Stadium; Attendance: 0 Referee: Raed Al-Zahrani

9 January 2021 12	Al-Shabab	1–0	Al-Ettifaq	Riyadh
17:55	Guanca 22', (yellow card) 90+2'; Bajandouh (yellow card) 64'; Salem (yellow card) 66'; Al-Qahtani (yellow card) 90+3'; Al-Bawardi (yellow card) 90+3'; Diop (yellow card) 90+4'	Report	Ghazi (yellow card) 25'; Kiss (yellow card) 70'	Stadium: Prince Khalid bin Sultan Stadium; Attendance: 0 Referee: Mohammed Al-Hoaish

14 January 2021 13	Al-Ettifaq	1–1	Al-Batin	Dammam
17:45	Azaro 38'; Kiss (yellow card) 60'; Mahnashi (yellow card) 83'	Report	Abreu 90+9' (pen.)	Stadium: Prince Mohamed bin Fahd Stadium; Attendance: 0 Referee: Khaled Salwi

19 January 2021 14	Al-Raed	2–3	Al-Ettifaq	Buraidah
15:40	Daoudi (yellow card) 32', (goal) 36'; Al-Mogren 63', (yellow card) 65'; Al-Dossari (yellow card) 82'	Report	Hazazi (yellow card) 61'; Kiss (yellow card) 66'; Souza 79'; Al-Hazaa 87', 89'	Stadium: King Abdullah Sport City Stadium; Attendance: 0 Referee: Shukri Al-Hanfoush

24 January 2021 15	Al-Ettifaq	1–2	Al-Ahli	Dammam
20:10	Souza (yellow card) 45+2'; Sliti 90+3' (pen.)	Report	Al Fatil 58'; Al-Owais (yellow card) 90+2'; Mendash 90+4'	Stadium: Prince Mohamed bin Fahd Stadium; Attendance: 0 Referee: Sultan Al-Harbi

30 January 2021 16	Al-Ettifaq	2–0	Al-Ittihad	Dammam
18:00	Hazazi (yellow card) 6'; Al-Robeai 9'; Al-Hazaa 56'; Al-Qumaizi (yellow card) 68'; Souza (yellow card) 85'	Report	Al-Aboud (yellow card) 45'; Al-Sahafi (yellow card) 62'	Stadium: Prince Mohamed bin Fahd Stadium; Attendance: 0 Referee: Majed Al-Shamrani

4 February 2021 17	Al-Ain	1–0	Al-Ettifaq	Al Bahah
16:05	Juanpi 24', (yellow card) 77'; Bastos (yellow card) 73'; Bradarić (yellow card) 86'	Report	Al Salis (yellow card) 80'	Stadium: King Saud Sport City Stadium; Attendance: 0 Referee: Mohammed Al-Hoaish

11 February 2021 18	Al-Ettifaq	4–1	Abha	Dammam
18:05	Al-Kwikbi 4', 31', (yellow card) 24'; Souza 8'; Sliti 69'	Report	Barnawi (yellow card) 20'; Al-Sharari (yellow card) 67'; Al Hamsal (yellow card) 78'; Sharahili 87'; Zidan (yellow card) 90+2'	Stadium: Prince Mohamed bin Fahd Stadium; Attendance: 0 Referee: Faisal Al-Blwi

18 February 2021 19	Al-Hilal	3–1	Al-Ettifaq	Riyadh
20:20	Gomis 58', 80'; N. Al-Dawsari (yellow card) 71'; Carrillo 73'	Report	Kiss 90+7' (pen.)	Stadium: Prince Faisal bin Fahd Stadium; Attendance: 0 Referee: Maguette Ndiaye (Senegal)

23 February 2021 20	Al-Fateh	2–3	Al-Ettifaq	Al-Hasa
18:20	Buhimed 36'; Al-Fuhaid (yellow card) 50' te Vrede 62' (pen.)	Report	Azaro (yellow card) 23', (goal) 47'; Ghazi (yellow card) 41'; Kiss (yellow card) 55'; Mets (yellow card) 62'; Al-Kwikbi 66'; Sliti 79'	Stadium: Prince Abdullah bin Jalawi Stadium; Attendance: 0 Referee: Turki Al-Khudhayr

27 February 2021 21	Al-Ettifaq	0–3	Al-Taawoun	Dammam
18:15	Kiss (yellow card) 59'; Azaro (yellow card) 79'	Report	Kaku 26'; Al-Nabit 46'; Tawamba 90+4'	Stadium: Prince Mohamed bin Fahd Stadium; Attendance: 0 Referee: Mohammed Al-Esmaiel

5 March 2021 22	Al-Ettifaq	1–1	Al-Nassr	Dammam
18:20	Azaro 3'; Hazazi (yellow card) 18' (yellow-red card) 27'; Souza (yellow card) 70'	Report	Al-Amri (yellow card) 38', (goal) 58'; Madu (yellow card) 54'; Martínez (yellow card) 90'; Abdullah (yellow card) 90+6'	Stadium: Prince Mohamed bin Fahd Stadium; Attendance: 0 Referee: Majed Al-Shamrani

11 March 2021 23	Damac	1–1	Al-Ettifaq	Abha
16:10	Chafaï 8'; Munshi (yellow card) 45+3'; Al-Rio (yellow card) 85'	Report	Al Salem 46'; Ghazi (yellow card) 53'; Mets (yellow card) 90'	Stadium: Prince Sultan bin Abdul Aziz Stadium; Attendance: 0 Referee: Sultan Al-Harbi

20 March 2021 24	Al-Ettifaq	1–0	Al-Faisaly	Dammam
18:30	Azaro (yellow card) 38', (goal) 82'; Ghazi (yellow card) 71'	Report	Silva (yellow card) 48'; Faik (yellow card) 78'; Malayekah (yellow card) 84'; Rossi (yellow card) 90+1'	Stadium: Prince Mohamed bin Fahd Stadium; Attendance: 0 Referee: Abdullah Al-Shehri

10 April 2021 25	Al-Ettifaq	1–3	Al-Qadsiah	Dammam
20:15	Azaro 30'; Doukara (yellow card) 62'; Mahnashi (yellow card) 73'; Al-Khateeb (yellow card) 90+6'	Report	Asprilla 14' (pen.), 53' (pen.), 73' (pen.), (yellow card) 24'	Stadium: Prince Mohamed bin Fahd Stadium; Attendance: 0 Referee: Turki Al-Khudhayr

17 April 2021 26	Al-Wehda	0–1	Al-Ettifaq	Mecca
22:10	Al Hejji (yellow card) 84'	Report	Al-Kwikbi 71'	Stadium: King Abdul Aziz Stadium; Attendance: 0 Referee: Mohammed Al-Esmaiel

14 May 2021 27	Al-Ettifaq	4–3	Al-Shabab	Dammam
18:50	Hawsawi (yellow card) 20'; Azaro 40', 68'; Doukara 48', (yellow card) 61'; Hazazi (yellow card) 54'; Al-Kwikbi 83'	Report	Ighalo 11', 22' (pen.); Martins 75'; Al-Abed (yellow card) 81'	Stadium: Prince Mohamed bin Fahd Stadium; Attendance: 0 Referee: Szymon Marciniak (Poland)

19 May 2021 28	Al-Batin	3–2	Al-Ettifaq	Hafar al-Batin
19:20	Abreu 16'; Hyland (yellow card) 56'; Al Abbas 78'; El Jebli 82'; Sami (yellow card) 84'	Report	Ghazi (yellow card) 3'; Kiss 50' (pen.); Al-Kwikbi 56'	Stadium: Al-Batin Club Stadium; Attendance: 342; Referee: Khalid Al-Johani

25 May 2021 29	Al-Ettifaq	3–1	Al-Raed	Dammam
21:00	Hawsawi (yellow card) 5'; Al-Robeai 14'; Sliti 18'; Azaro 50', (yellow card) 68' (yellow-red card) 68'	Report	Issa (yellow card) 16'; Djoum (yellow card) 35'; Fernández 88'	Stadium: Prince Mohamed bin Fahd Stadium; Attendance: 866; Referee: Shukri Al-Hanfoush

30 May 2021 30	Al-Ahli	1–2	Al-Ettifaq	Jeddah
21:00	Al-Majhad 8'; Hassoun (yellow card) 42'	Report	Al-Kwikbi 5'; Hazazi (yellow card) 26', (goal) 65'	Stadium: King Abdullah Sports City Reserve Stadium; Attendance: 196; Referee: Sultan Sughayyir

=== King Cup ===
All times are local, AST (UTC+3).

17 December 2020 Round of 16	Al-Ettifaq	0–0 (8–9 p)	Al-Faisaly	Dammam
17:25	Doukara (yellow card) 10'; Hazazi (yellow card) 34'; Ghazi (yellow card) 104'	Report	Guilherme (yellow card) 78'; Silva (yellow card) 107'	Stadium: Prince Mohamed bin Fahd Stadium; Attendance: 0 Referee: Mohammed Al-Hoaish
	Penalties
	Kiss (penalty scored); Souza (penalty scored); Sliti (penalty scored); Al-Kwikbi (penalty missed); Al-Ghamdi (penalty scored); Ghazi (penalty scored); Azaro (penalty scored); Mets (penalty scored); Al-Qumaizi (penalty scored); Mahnashi (penalty missed)		(penalty scored) Tavares; (penalty scored) Guilherme; (penalty missed) Faik; (penalty scored) Al-Sharid; (penalty scored) Al-Saiari; (penalty scored) Rossi; (penalty scored) Silva; (penalty scored) Omar; (penalty scored) Qassem; (penalty scored) Al-Kassar

== Statistics ==
=== Appearances ===
Last updated on 30 May 2021.

No.	Pos	Nat	Player	Total		Pro League		King Cup	
No.	Pos	Nat	Player	Apps	Goals	Apps	Goals	Apps	Goals
Goalkeepers
23	GK	(Algeria) ALG	Raïs M'Bolhi	19	0	18	0	1	0
30	GK	(Saudi Arabia) KSA	Abdullah Al-Saleh	0	0	0	0	0	0
35	GK	(Saudi Arabia) KSA	Mohammed Al-Haiti	12	0	12	0	0	0
Defenders
2	DF	(Saudi Arabia) KSA	Ali Masrahi	5	0	5	0	0	0
4	DF	(Saudi Arabia) KSA	Fahad Ghazi	18	0	17	0	0+1	0
5	DF	(Estonia) EST	Karol Mets	23	0	20+2	0	1	0
12	DF	(Saudi Arabia) KSA	Sanousi Hawsawi	19	0	13+5	0	1	0
17	DF	(Saudi Arabia) KSA	Saleh Al-Qumaizi	26	0	23+2	0	1	0
18	DF	(Saudi Arabia) KSA	Abdullah Al-Khateeb	10	0	7+3	0	0	0
25	DF	(Saudi Arabia) KSA	Saeed Al-Robeai	18	2	16+2	2	0	0
33	DF	(Saudi Arabia) KSA	Hamad Al-Sayyaf	2	0	2	0	0	0
Midfielders
6	MF	(Saudi Arabia) KSA	Ibrahim Mahnashi	19	1	2+16	1	0+1	0
7	MF	(Saudi Arabia) KSA	Mohammed Al-Kwikbi	26	8	24+1	8	1	0
8	MF	(Saudi Arabia) KSA	Hamed Al-Ghamdi	22	2	2+19	2	0+1	0
10	MF	(Tunisia) TUN	Naïm Sliti	29	9	24+4	9	1	0
11	MF	(Saudi Arabia) KSA	Ali Hazazi	27	2	22+4	2	1	0
14	MF	(Slovakia) SVK	Filip Kiss	29	8	28	8	1	0
15	MF	(Saudi Arabia) KSA	Ahmed Al-Ghamdi	1	0	0+1	0	0	0
16	MF	(Saudi Arabia) KSA	Faisal Al-Ghamdi	0	0	0	0	0	0
20	MF	(Brazil) BRA	Souza	30	2	29	2	1	0
24	MF	(Saudi Arabia) KSA	Saad Al-Selouli	17	0	3+14	0	0	0
29	MF	(Saudi Arabia) KSA	Fahad Al-Dossari	1	0	0+1	0	0	0
Forwards
9	FW	(Saudi Arabia) KSA	Hazaa Al-Hazaa	16	3	7+9	3	0	0
19	FW	(Saudi Arabia) KSA	Hassan Al Salis	4	0	1+3	0	0	0
21	FW	(Morocco) MAR	Walid Azaro	26	9	21+4	9	0+1	0
27	FW	(Saudi Arabia) KSA	Abdullah Al Salem	22	2	10+11	2	1	0
32	FW	(Saudi Arabia) KSA	Rayan Al-Bloushi	2	0	0+2	0	0	0
39	FW	(Senegal) SEN	Souleymane Doukara	28	2	24+3	2	1	0
Players sent out on loan this season
34	DF	(Saudi Arabia) KSA	Ali Al-Khaibari	0	0	0	0	0	0
36	DF	(Saudi Arabia) KSA	Hussein Halawani	1	0	0+1	0	0	0

=== Goalscorers ===
Rank	No.	Pos	Nat	Name	Pro League	King Cup	Total
1	10	MF	(Tunisia)	Naïm Sliti	9	0	9
1	21	FW	(Morocco)	Walid Azaro	9	0	9
3	7	MF	(Saudi Arabia)	Mohammed Al-Kwikbi	8	0	8
3	14	MF	(Slovakia)	Filip Kiss	8	0	8
5	9	FW	(Saudi Arabia)	Hazaa Al-Hazaa	3	0	3
6	8	MF	(Saudi Arabia)	Hamed Al-Ghamdi	2	0	2
6	11	MF	(Saudi Arabia)	Ali Hazazi	2	0	2
6	20	MF	(Brazil)	Souza	2	0	2
6	25	DF	(Saudi Arabia)	Saeed Al-Robeai	2	0	2
6	27	FW	(Saudi Arabia)	Abdullah Al Salem	2	0	2
6	39	FW	(Senegal)	Souleymane Doukara	2	0	2
12	6	MF	(Saudi Arabia)	Ibrahim Mahnashi	1	0	1
Own goal					0	0	0
Total					50	0	50

Last Updated: 30 May 2021

=== Assists ===
Rank	No.	Pos	Nat	Name	Pro League	King Cup	Total
1	10	MF	(Tunisia)	Naïm Sliti	8	0	8
2	7	MF	(Saudi Arabia)	Mohammed Al-Kwikbi	6	0	6
3	39	FW	(Senegal)	Souleymane Doukara	5	0	5
4	20	MF	(Brazil)	Souza	4	0	4
5	12	DF	(Saudi Arabia)	Sanousi Hawsawi	2	0	2
6	4	DF	(Saudi Arabia)	Fahad Ghazi	1	0	1
6	11	MF	(Saudi Arabia)	Ali Hazazi	1	0	1
6	14	MF	(Slovakia)	Filip Kiss	1	0	1
6	21	FW	(Morocco)	Walid Azaro	1	0	1
6	25	DF	(Saudi Arabia)	Saeed Al-Robeai	1	0	1
Total					30	0	30

Last Updated: 30 May 2021

=== Clean sheets ===
Rank	No.	Pos	Nat	Name	Pro League	King Cup	Total
1	23	GK	(Algeria)	Raïs M'Bolhi	3	1	4
2	35	GK	(Saudi Arabia)	Mohammed Al-Haiti	1	0	1
Total					4	1	5

Last Updated: 17 April 2021
