= 2022–23 Ettifaq FC season =

Association football season

Al-Ettifaq
2022–23 season
- President: Khalid Al-Dabal
- Manager: Patrice Carteron (until 26 February); Antonio Cazorla (from 26 February)
- Stadium: Prince Mohamed bin Fahd Stadium
- SPL: 7th
- King Cup: Round of 16 (knocked out by Al-Hilal)
- Top goalscorer: League: Youssouf Niakaté (8); All: Youssouf Niakaté (8)
- Highest home attendance: 17,183 (vs. Al-Nassr, 27 May 2023)
- Lowest home attendance: 1,225 (vs. Abha, 7 January 2023)
- Average home league attendance: 5,561
- All statistics correct as of 31 May 2023.

The 2022–23 season was Al-Ettifaq's 44th non-consecutive season in the Pro League and their 77th season in existence. The club participated in the Pro League and the King Cup.

The season covered the period from 1 July 2022 to 30 June 2023.

== Players ==
=== Squad information ===
As of 1 February 2023

Note: Flags indicate national team as defined under FIFA eligibility rules; some limited exceptions apply. Players may hold more than one non-FIFA nationality.

No.	Pos.	Nation	Player
1	GK	KSA	Abdullah Al-Oaisher
2	DF	KSA	Saeed Al Mowalad
4	DF	KSA	Fahad Ghazi
5	DF	KSA	Saad Al-Mousa
6	MF	KSA	Ibrahim Mahnashi
7	MF	KSA	Mohammed Al-Kuwaykibi
8	MF	KSA	Hamed Al-Ghamdi
10	MF	TUN	Naïm Sliti
11	MF	KSA	Ali Hazazi
12	DF	KSA	Sanousi Hawsawi
13	DF	KSA	Abdulrahman Al-Obaid (on loan from Al-Hilal)
14	DF	MKD	Darko Velkovski
15	MF	KSA	Ahmed Al-Ghamdi
16	MF	KSA	Faisal Al-Ghamdi
17	FW	KSA	Abdullah Al Salem

No.	Pos.	Nation	Player
18	FW	FRA	Youssouf Niakaté
20	FW	KSA	Rayan Al-Bloushi
23	FW	KSA	Jaber Qarradi
24	MF	KSA	Nawaf Hazazi
27	MF	BRA	Vitinho
32	DF	COD	Marcel Tisserand
35	GK	KSA	Mohammed Al-Haiti
44	DF	KSA	Hamad Al-Sayyaf
48	GK	BRA	Paulo Victor
49	DF	CHA	Abdulrahman Oumar
70	DF	KSA	Abdullah Al-Khateeb
76	GK	KSA	Bilal Al-Dawaa
92	GK	KSA	Turki Baljoush
98	MF	TUR	Berat Özdemir
99	FW	SWE	Robin Quaison

=== Out on loan ===
Note: Flags indicate national team as defined under FIFA eligibility rules; some limited exceptions apply. Players may hold more than one non-FIFA nationality.

No.	Pos.	Nation	Player
20	MF	GER	Amin Younes (at FC Utrecht until 30 June 2023)
29	DF	KSA	Fahad Al-Dossari (at Al-Kholood until 30 June 2023)

No.	Pos.	Nation	Player
42	MF	KSA	Salem Al-Maqadi (at Al-Sahel until 30 June 2023)
90	MF	KSA	Mohammed Mahrazi (at Al-Shoulla until 30 June 2023)

== Transfers and loans ==
=== Transfers in ===
Entry date	Position	No.	Player	From club	Fee	Ref.
30 June 2022	DF	44	(Saudi Arabia) Hamad Al-Sayyaf	(Saudi Arabia) Al-Sahel	End of loan	
30 June 2022	DF	–	(Saudi Arabia) Ahmed Al Muhaimeed	(Saudi Arabia) Al-Jabalain	End of loan	
30 June 2022	MF	88	(Saudi Arabia) Hassan Ghazwani	(Saudi Arabia) Al-Sahel	End of loan	
30 June 2022	MF	90	(Saudi Arabia) Hisham Al-Farhan	(Saudi Arabia) Al-Nojoom	End of loan	
30 June 2022	FW	9	(Saudi Arabia) Hazaa Al-Hazaa	(Saudi Arabia) Al-Taawoun	End of loan	
30 June 2022	FW	27	(Saudi Arabia) Rayan Al-Bloushi	(Saudi Arabia) Al-Fayha	End of loan	
8 July 2022	GK	48	(Brazil) Paulo Victor	(Portugal) Marítimo	Free	
9 August 2022	MF	98	(Turkey) Berat Özdemir	(Turkey) Trabzonspor	$2,500,000	
21 August 2022	DF	32	(Democratic Republic of the Congo) Marcel Tisserand	(Turkey) Fenerbahçe	$3,000,000	
29 August 2022	MF	27	(Brazil) Vitinho	(Brazil) Flamengo	Free	
31 August 2022	DF	14	(North Macedonia) Darko Velkovski	(Croatia) Rijeka	Free	
31 August 2022	DF	3	(Saudi Arabia) Mohammed Al-Dawsari	(Saudi Arabia) Al-Hilal	Free	

=== Loans in ===
Start date	End date	Position	No.	Player	From club	Fee	Ref.
8 July 2022	End of season	DF	13	(Saudi Arabia) Abdulrahman Al-Obaid	(Saudi Arabia) Al-Hilal	None	

=== Transfers out ===
Exit date	Position	No.	Player	To club	Fee	Ref.
1 July 2022	DF	25	(Saudi Arabia) Saeed Al-Rubaie	(Saudi Arabia) Al-Shabab	Free	
1 July 2022	MF	14	(Slovakia) Filip Kiss	(United Arab Emirates) Al-Ittihad Kalba	Free	
5 July 2022	MF	24	(Saudi Arabia) Saad Al-Selouli	(Saudi Arabia) Abha	Free	
12 July 2022	DF	5	(Algeria) Ayoub Abdellaoui	(Algeria) MC Alger	Free	
31 July 2022	FW	19	(Saudi Arabia) Hassan Al Salis	(Saudi Arabia) Al-Fateh	Undisclosed	
1 August 2022	GK	30	(Saudi Arabia) Abdullah Al-Saleh		Released	
1 August 2022	MF	88	(Saudi Arabia) Hassan Ghazwani	(Saudi Arabia) Al-Batin	Free	
27 August 2022	DF	–	(Saudi Arabia) Ahmed Al Muhaimeed	(Saudi Arabia) Al-Hazem	Free	
31 August 2022	FW	9	(Saudi Arabia) Hazaa Al-Hazaa	(Saudi Arabia) Al-Tai	$532,000	
1 September 2022	DF	50	(Saudi Arabia) Saad Al Khayri	(Saudi Arabia) Al-Wehda	Free	
9 September 2022	GK	23	(Algeria) Raïs M'Bolhi	(Saudi Arabia) Al-Qadsiah	Free	
23 September 2022	GK	–	(Saudi Arabia) Osama Jahaf	(Saudi Arabia) Al-Nairyah	Free	
1 January 2023	MF	40	(Saudi Arabia) Majed Al-Najrani	(Saudi Arabia) Al-Kholood	Free	

=== Loans out ===
Start date	End date	Position	No.	Player	To club	Fee	Ref.
25 August 2022	End of season	MF	90	(Saudi Arabia) Mohammed Mahrazi	(Saudi Arabia) Al-Shoulla	None	
31 August 2022	End of season	MF	20	(Germany) Amin Younes	(Netherlands) Utrecht	None	
1 September 2022	End of season	MF	42	(Saudi Arabia) Salem Al-Maqadi	(Saudi Arabia) Al-Sahel	None	
28 January 2023	End of season	DF	29	(Saudi Arabia) Fahad Al-Dossari	(Saudi Arabia) Al-Kholood	None	

== Pre-season ==
29 July 2022 Friendly	Al-Ettifaq (Saudi Arabia)	4–0	Oman U23	Istanbul, Turkey
17:00 TRT	Niakaté 12'; H. Al-Ghamdi 37'; Al Salem 61'; Quaison 85'	Report		Stadium: Fenerbahçe Topuk Yaylası Resort&Sport

3 August 2022 Friendly	Al-Ettifaq (Saudi Arabia)	0–0	(Albania) Kukësi	Istanbul, Turkey
17:00 TRT		Report		Stadium: Fenerbahçe Topuk Yaylası Resort&Sport

7 August 2022 Friendly	Al-Ettifaq (Saudi Arabia)	1–1	(Turkey) Sakaryaspor	Istanbul, Turkey
16:00 TRT	Al-Kuwaykibi 27'	Report	Hawsawi 12' (o.g.)	Stadium: Fenerbahçe Topuk Yaylası Resort&Sport

9 August 2022 Friendly	Al-Ettifaq (Saudi Arabia)	0–0	(Turkey) Amed	Istanbul, Turkey
17:00 TRT		Report		Stadium: Fenerbahçe Topuk Yaylası Resort&Sport

14 August 2022 Friendly	Al-Ettifaq (Saudi Arabia)	1–0	(Saudi Arabia) Al-Khaleej	Sapanca, Turkey
18:00 TRT	Quaison 68' (pen.)	Report		Stadium: Sapanca Kurtköy Stadı

17 August 2022 Friendly	Al-Ettifaq (Saudi Arabia)	1–0	(Bahrain) Al-Khaldiya	Darıca, Turkey
16:00 TRT	Al-Kuwaykibi 60'	Report		Stadium: Darıca 15 Temmuz Stadyumu

== Competitions ==
=== Overview ===
Competition	Record							
Competition	G	W	D	L	GF	GA	GD	Win %
Pro League	30	10	7	13	28	36	−8	33.33
King Cup	1	0	0	1	0	4	−4	0.00
Total	31	10	7	14	28	40	−12	32.26

Updated to match played 31 May 2023
Source: Competitions

=== Pro League ===
==== League table ====
Pos	Team	Pld	W	D	L	GF	GA	GD	Pts
5	Al-Taawoun	30	16	7	7	46	34	+12	55
6	Al-Fateh	30	13	4	13	48	43	+5	43
7	Al-Ettifaq	30	10	7	13	28	36	−8	37
8	Damac	30	9	9	12	33	43	−10	36
9	Al-Tai	30	10	4	16	41	49	−8	34 (Note: Al-Tai finished ahead of Al-Raed on head-to-head points: Al-Tai: 4 pts, Al-Raed: 1 pts (Al-Raed 0–2 Al-Tai, Al-Tai 2–2 Al-Raed).)

Updated to match(es) played on 31 May 2023. Source: SPL
Rules for classification: 1) Points; 2) Head-to-head points; 3) Head-to-head goal difference; 4) Total goal difference; 5) Total goals scored; 6) Fair-play points (Note: Head-to-head record is used only after all the matches between the teams in question have been played).

==== Results summary ====
Overall								Home						Away					
Pld	W	D	L	GF	GA	GD	Pts	W	D	L	GF	GA	GD	W	D	L	GF	GA	GD
30	10	7	13	28	36	−8	37	7	3	5	17	17	0	3	4	8	11	19	−8

Last updated: 27 May 2023.
Source: spl.com.sa

==== Results by round ====
Round	1	2	3	4	5	6	7	8	9	10	11	12	13	14	15	16	17	18	19	20	21	22	23	24	25	26	27	28	29	30
Ground	H	A	H	H	A	H	A	H	A	H	A	H	A	A	H	A	H	A	A	H	A	H	A	H	A	H	A	H	H	A
Result	L	D	W	L	D	D	W	L	D	W	L	W	L	L	W	L	L	L	W	D	L	W	D	W	L	W	L	L	D	W
Position	10	11	8	9	10	10	8	10	10	10	10	8	10	10	9	10	11	12	10	10	11	12	12	8	9	8	8	10	10	7

Updated to match(es) played on 31 May 2023. Source: spl.com.sa
A = Away; H = Home; W = Win; D = Draw; L = Loss

==== Matches ====
All times are local, AST (UTC+3).

Win Draw Loss Postponed

26 August 2022 1	Al-Ettifaq	1–2	Al-Tai	Dammam
18:45	Al-Kuwaykibi 22'; Al-Mowalad (yellow card) 26'	Report	Mbenza 6'; Al-Jubairi (yellow card) 26'; Fai (yellow card) 56'; Al-Qunaian 65'	Stadium: Prince Mohamed bin Fahd Stadium; Attendance: 3,878; Referee: Sami Al-Jires

3 September 2022 2	Al-Ittihad	0–0	Al-Ettifaq	Jeddah
21:00	Romarinho (yellow card) 86'	Report	Al-Obaid (yellow card) 35'; Tisserand (yellow card) 86'; Niakaté (yellow card) 90+4'	Stadium: King Abdullah Sports City; Attendance: 33,556; Referee: Daniele Orsato (Italy)

9 September 2022 3	Al-Ettifaq	3–0	Al-Batin	Dammam
18:30	Al-Khateeb (yellow card) 45+5'; Vitinho 66'; Niakaté 88' (pen.); Al-Dhafiri 90+5' (o.g.)	Report	Al-Mutairi (yellow card) 33'; Nasser (yellow card) 87'; Naji (yellow card) 87'	Stadium: Prince Mohamed bin Fahd Stadium; Attendance: 2,608; Referee: Mamdouh Al Shahdan

15 September 2022 4	Al-Ettifaq	1–2	Al-Raed	Dammam
21:00	Quaison 40'; Velkovski (yellow card) 45+1'; Hazazi (yellow card) 49'	Report	El Berkaoui 45+2'; Fouzair (yellow card) 55', (goal) 86'	Stadium: Prince Mohamed bin Fahd Stadium; Attendance: 5,731; Referee: Abdulaziz Al-Shehri

1 October 2022 5	Al-Wehda	1–1	Al-Ettifaq	Mecca
21:00	Beauguel 8'; Al-Eisa (yellow card) 48'; Botía (yellow card) 87'	Report	Özdemir 45', (yellow card) 62'	Stadium: King Abdul Aziz Stadium; Attendance: 2,237; Referee: Ahmed Al-Rumaikhani

6 October 2022 6	Al-Ettifaq	0–0	Al-Hilal	Dammam
21:00		Report	Al-Yami (yellow card) 12'; N. Al-Dawsari (yellow card) 30'	Stadium: Prince Mohamed bin Fahd Stadium; Attendance: 11,321; Referee: Sami Al-Jires

11 October 2022 7	Al-Fayha	0–3	Al-Ettifaq	Al Majma'ah
20:30	Al-Safri (yellow card) 19'; Al-Khalaf (yellow card) 90+4'	Report	Vitinho 26', (yellow card) 34'; Sliti 30'; Mahnashi (yellow card) 80'; Al Salem 82'	Stadium: Al Majma'ah Sports City; Attendance: 2,271; Referee: Abdullah Al-Harbi

16 October 2022 8	Al-Ettifaq	0–1	Al-Taawoun	Dammam
20:30		Report	Al-Nasser 18'; El Mahdioui (yellow card) 60'; Kaku (yellow card) 71'; Naldo (yellow card) 89'	Stadium: Prince Mohamed bin Fahd Stadium; Attendance: 3,494; Referee: Shukri Al-Hanfoush

15 December 2022 9	Damac	0–0	Al-Ettifaq	Abha
15:30	Hawsawi (yellow card) 24'; Maher (yellow card) 86'	Report	F. Al-Ghamdi (red card) 90+7'	Stadium: Prince Sultan bin Abdul Aziz Stadium; Attendance: 311; Referee: Shukri Al-Hanfoush

25 December 2022 10	Al-Ettifaq	1–0	Al-Khaleej	Dammam
20:30	Hazazi 46', (yellow card) 62'; Özdemir (yellow card) 48'; H. Al-Ghamdi (yellow card) 74'	Report	Al-Shanqiti (yellow card) 9'	Stadium: Prince Mohamed bin Fahd Stadium; Attendance: 3,522; Referee: Khaled Al-Teris

30 December 2022 11	Al-Shabab	3–0	Al-Ettifaq	Riyadh
20:30	Mina 21'; Santos 45+1'; Banega (yellow card) 56'; Al-Khateeb 86' (o.g.)	Report	Mahnashi (yellow card) 43'	Stadium: Prince Faisal bin Fahd Stadium; Attendance: 2,781; Referee: Mohammed Al-Esmaiel

7 January 2023 12	Al-Ettifaq	2–1	Abha	Dammam
18:00	Vitinho (yellow card) 57'; Hawsawi 68'; Niakaté 90+7'	Report	Al-Zori 28'; Natiq (yellow card) 38'; Sami (yellow card) 64'	Stadium: Prince Mohamed bin Fahd Stadium; Attendance: 1,225; Referee: Mohammed Al-Hoaish

12 January 2023 13	Al-Fateh	2–0	Al-Ettifaq	Al-Hasa
15:30	Kanabah 4'; Al-Daheem (yellow card) 45+6'; Saâdane 59' (pen.)	Report	Hawsawi (red card) 40'; Al-Mowalad (yellow card) 57'	Stadium: Prince Abdullah bin Jalawi Stadium; Attendance: 12,743; Referee: Faisal Al-Blwi

22 January 2023 14	Al-Nassr	1–0	Al-Ettifaq	Riyadh
20:30	Talisca 31'	Report	Al-Mowalad (yellow card) 22'; Al-Mousa (yellow card) 86'	Stadium: Mrsool Park; Attendance: 22,862; Referee: Khaled Al-Teris

3 February 2023 15	Al-Ettifaq	3–2	Al-Adalah	Dammam
20:30	Niakaté 3'; Quaison 76' (pen.); Vitinho 82'; Özdemir (yellow card) 90+12'	Report	Godál 43', (yellow card) 58'; Antonsson 47'; Gonzáles (yellow card) 64' (yellow-red card) 70'	Stadium: Prince Mohamed bin Fahd Stadium; Attendance: 2,812; Referee: Mamdouh Al Shahdan

10 February 2023 16	Al-Tai	2–0	Al-Ettifaq	Ha'il
16:00	Ali 20'; Sayoud 63'; Al-Johani (yellow card) 76'	Report		Stadium: Prince Abdul Aziz bin Musa'ed Stadium; Attendance: 6,027; Referee: Abdulsamad Bakri

16 February 2023 17	Al-Ettifaq	0–3	Al-Ittihad	Dammam
20:30	Hawsawi (yellow card) 39'; Al-Ghamdi (yellow card) 70'	Report	Costa 19'; Romarinho 59'; Camara 67'; Grohe (yellow card) 77'; Hegazi (yellow card) 89'	Stadium: Prince Mohamed bin Fahd Stadium; Attendance: 14,135; Referee: Artur Soares Dias (Portugal)

25 February 2023 18	Al-Batin	1–0	Al-Ettifaq	Hafar al-Batin
16:00	Al-Qarni (yellow card) 33'; López 41'; Al-Shamlan (yellow card) 90+3'	Report	Al-Mousa (yellow card) 86'	Stadium: Al-Batin Club Stadium; Attendance: 3,193; Referee: Ahmed Al-Rumaikhani

3 March 2023 19	Al-Raed	1–2	Al-Ettifaq	Buraidah
16:00	Fouzair 22' (pen.); Hazazi (yellow card) 90+6'	Report	Quaison (yellow card) 7', (goal) 45+7'; Al-Mowalad (yellow card) 17'; Hawsawi 90+3'	Stadium: King Abdullah Sport City Stadium; Attendance: 4,454; Referee: Abdullah Al-Kharboush

9 March 2023 20	Al-Ettifaq	1–1	Al-Wehda	Dammam
16:00	Quaison 70' (pen.)	Report	Al Hejji 22', (yellow card) 29'; Bukhari (yellow card) 58'; Al-Hafith (yellow card) 76'; Kurdi (yellow card) 88'	Stadium: Prince Mohamed bin Fahd Stadium; Attendance: 1,270; Referee: Shukri Al-Hanfoush

18 March 2023 21	Al-Hilal	3–0	Al-Ettifaq	Riyadh
20:30	Ighalo 15'; Kanno 34'; Al-Dawsari 90'; Al-Bulaihi (yellow card) 90+5'	Report	Quaison (yellow card) 37'; Al-Ghamdi (yellow card) 57'; Hazazi (yellow card) 65'	Stadium: Prince Faisal bin Fahd Stadium; Attendance: 8,896; Referee: Daniele Orsato (Italy)

9 April 2023 23	Al-Taawoun	1–1	Al-Ettifaq	Buraidah
22:00	Radif 79'; Medrán (yellow card) 84'; El Mahdioui (yellow card) 86'	Report	Quaison 6'; F. Al-Ghamdi (yellow card) 50'	Stadium: King Abdullah Sport City Stadium; Attendance: 4,800; Referee: Khaled Al-Teris

14 April 2023 22	Al-Ettifaq	1–0	Al-Fayha	Dammam
22:00	Niakaté 90+1', (yellow card) 90+9'	Report	Al-Baqawi (yellow card) 88'	Stadium: Prince Mohamed bin Fahd Stadium; Attendance: 3,510; Referee: Mohammed Al-Hoaish

28 April 2023 24	Al-Ettifaq	2–0	Damac	Dammam
19:00	Vitinho (yellow card) 27'; F. Al-Ghamdi (yellow card) 45+2'; Niakaté 89', 90+6'	Report	Al-Nakhli (yellow card) 49'; Hawsawi (yellow card) 50'; Bedrane (red card) 58'	Stadium: Prince Mohamed bin Fahd Stadium; Attendance: 2,208; Referee: Mohammed Al-Esmaiel

2 May 2023 25	Al-Khaleej	2–1	Al-Ettifaq	Dammam
21:30	Al-Owdah (yellow card) 29'; Cikalleshi 34' (pen.); Martins 71'	Report	Al-Kuwaykibi 22'; F. Al-Ghamdi (yellow card) 35'	Stadium: Prince Mohamed bin Fahd Stadium; Attendance: 6,988; Referee: Abdullah Al-Shehri

14 May 2023 26	Al-Ettifaq	1–0	Al-Shabab	Dammam
19:00	Quaison 17'	Report	Santos (yellow card) 90+2'	Stadium: Prince Mohamed bin Fahd Stadium; Attendance: 6,950; Referee: Faisal Al-Blwi

18 May 2023 27	Abha	2–1	Al-Ettifaq	Abha
19:00	Saddiki (yellow card) 44'; Bguir 64', 72' (pen.), (yellow card) 73'; Matić (yellow card) 82'	Report	Velkovski (yellow card) 70'; Al-Mowalad (yellow card) 79'; Niakaté 90+1'	Stadium: Prince Sultan bin Abdul Aziz Stadium; Attendance: 601; Referee: Ahmed Al-Rumaikhani

22 May 2023 28	Al-Ettifaq	0–4	Al-Fateh	Dammam
19:00	Hawsawi (red card) 5'; Al-Mousa (yellow card) 42' (yellow-red card) 64'; Niakaté (yellow card) 51'	Report	Al-Buraikan 12', 40' (pen.); Buhimed (yellow card) 29'; Al-Ghannam 73', 81'	Stadium: Prince Mohamed bin Fahd Stadium; Attendance: 3,574; Referee: Raed Al-Zahrani

27 May 2023 29	Al-Ettifaq	1–1	Al-Nassr	Dammam
21:00	Al-Khateeb (yellow card) 24'; Niakaté 43'; Özdemir (yellow card) 86'; Quaison (yellow card) 90+2'	Report	Al-Khaibari (yellow card) 22'; S. Al-Ghannam (yellow card) 44'; Boushal (yellow card) 53'; Gustavo 56'; Yahya (yellow card) 90+7'	Stadium: Prince Mohamed bin Fahd Stadium; Attendance: 17,183; Referee: Abdullah Al-Harbi

31 May 2023 30	Al-Adalah	0–2	Al-Ettifaq	Al-Hasa
21:00	Al-Alawi (yellow card) 18'; Al-Harbi (yellow card) 90+5'	Report	H. Al-Ghamdi 89', 90+9'	Stadium: Prince Abdullah bin Jalawi Stadium; Attendance: 15,179; Referee: Khaled Al-Teris

=== King Cup ===
All times are local, AST (UTC+3).

21 December 2022 Round of 16	Al-Hilal	4–0	Al-Ettifaq	Riyadh
18:00	Ighalo 12'; Al-Breik 42'; Vietto 45+5'; Michael 90+3'	Report	F. Al-Ghamdi (yellow card) 27'; Sliti (red card) 40'	Stadium: Prince Faisal bin Fahd Stadium; Attendance: 4,372; Referee: István Kovács (Romania)

== Statistics ==
=== Appearances ===
Last updated on 31 May 2023.

No.	Pos	Nat	Player	Total		Pro League		King Cup	
No.	Pos	Nat	Player	Apps	Goals	Apps	Goals	Apps	Goals
Goalkeepers
1	GK	(Saudi Arabia) KSA	Abdullah Al-Oaisher	0	0	0	0	0	0
35	GK	(Saudi Arabia) KSA	Mohammed Al-Haiti	0	0	0	0	0	0
48	GK	(Brazil) BRA	Paulo Victor	31	0	30	0	1	0
76	GK	(Saudi Arabia) KSA	Bilal Al-Dawaa	0	0	0	0	0	0
92	GK	(Saudi Arabia) KSA	Turki Baljoush	0	0	0	0	0	0
Defenders
2	DF	(Saudi Arabia) KSA	Saeed Al Mowalad	27	0	26	0	1	0
3	DF	(Saudi Arabia) KSA	Mohammed Al-Dawsari	2	0	2	0	0	0
4	DF	(Saudi Arabia) KSA	Fahad Ghazi	6	0	0+6	0	0	0
5	DF	(Saudi Arabia) KSA	Saad Al-Mousa	20	0	18+1	0	1	0
12	DF	(Saudi Arabia) KSA	Sanousi Hawsawi	24	2	17+6	2	0+1	0
13	DF	(Saudi Arabia) KSA	Abdulrahman Al-Obaid	10	0	5+4	0	1	0
14	DF	(North Macedonia) MKD	Darko Velkovski	15	0	12+3	0	0	0
32	DF	(Democratic Republic of the Congo) COD	Marcel Tisserand	28	0	27	0	1	0
44	DF	(Saudi Arabia) KSA	Hamad Al-Sayyaf	1	0	0+1	0	0	0
49	DF	(Chad) CHA	Abdulrahman Oumar	3	0	1+2	0	0	0
51	DF	(Saudi Arabia) KSA	Meshal Al-Alaeli	0	0	0	0	0	0
70	DF	(Saudi Arabia) KSA	Abdullah Al-Khateeb	23	0	17+5	0	1	0
Midfielders
6	MF	(Saudi Arabia) KSA	Ibrahim Mahnashi	23	0	18+4	0	0+1	0
7	MF	(Saudi Arabia) KSA	Mohammed Al-Kuwaykibi	24	2	22+1	2	0+1	0
8	MF	(Saudi Arabia) KSA	Hamed Al-Ghamdi	20	2	5+14	2	0+1	0
10	MF	(Tunisia) TUN	Naïm Sliti	12	1	10+1	1	1	0
11	MF	(Saudi Arabia) KSA	Ali Hazazi	24	1	20+4	1	0	0
15	MF	(Saudi Arabia) KSA	Ahmed Al-Ghamdi	25	0	7+17	0	1	0
16	MF	(Saudi Arabia) KSA	Faisal Al-Ghamdi	24	0	14+9	0	1	0
24	MF	(Saudi Arabia) KSA	Nawaf Hazazi	4	0	0+4	0	0	0
27	MF	(Brazil) BRA	Vitinho	28	3	21+6	3	1	0
66	MF	(Saudi Arabia) KSA	Rakan Al-Kaabi	1	0	0+1	0	0	0
98	MF	(Turkey) TUR	Berat Özdemir	27	1	23+3	1	1	0
Forwards
17	FW	(Saudi Arabia) KSA	Abdullah Al Salem	21	1	3+18	1	0	0
18	FW	(France) FRA	Youssouf Niakaté	25	8	13+12	8	0	0
20	FW	(Saudi Arabia) KSA	Rayan Al-Bloushi	2	0	0+2	0	0	0
23	FW	(Saudi Arabia) KSA	Jaber Qarradi	0	0	0	0	0	0
99	FW	(Sweden) SWE	Robin Quaison	27	6	19+7	6	0+1	0
Players sent out on loan this season
29	DF	(Saudi Arabia) KSA	Fahad Al-Dossari	2	0	0+2	0	0	0

=== Goalscorers ===
Rank	No.	Pos	Nat	Name	Pro League	King Cup	Total
1	18	FW	(France)	Youssouf Niakaté	8	0	8
2	99	FW	(Sweden)	Robin Quaison	6	0	6
3	27	MF	(Brazil)	Vitinho	3	0	3
4	7	MF	(Saudi Arabia)	Mohammed Al-Kuwaykibi	2	0	2
4	8	MF	(Saudi Arabia)	Hamed Al-Ghamdi	2	0	2
4	12	DF	(Saudi Arabia)	Sanousi Hawsawi	2	0	2
7	10	MF	(Tunisia)	Naïm Sliti	1	0	1
7	11	MF	(Saudi Arabia)	Ali Hazazi	1	0	1
7	17	FW	(Saudi Arabia)	Abdullah Al Salem	1	0	1
7	98	MF	(Turkey)	Berat Özdemir	1	0	1
Own goal					1	0	1
Total					28	0	28

Last Updated: 31 May 2023

=== Assists ===
Rank	No.	Pos	Nat	Name	Pro League	King Cup	Total
1	2	DF	(Saudi Arabia)	Saeed Al Mowalad	5	0	5
2	7	MF	(Saudi Arabia)	Mohammed Al-Kuwaykibi	3	0	3
3	27	MF	(Brazil)	Vitinho	2	0	2
3	99	FW	(Sweden)	Robin Quaison	2	0	2
5	8	MF	(Saudi Arabia)	Hamed Al-Ghamdi	1	0	1
5	11	MF	(Saudi Arabia)	Ali Hazazi	1	0	1
5	13	DF	(Saudi Arabia)	Abdulrahman Al-Obaid	1	0	1
5	15	MF	(Saudi Arabia)	Ahmed Al-Ghamdi	1	0	1
5	16	MF	(Saudi Arabia)	Faisal Al-Ghamdi	1	0	1
5	17	FW	(Saudi Arabia)	Abdullah Al Salem	1	0	1
5	18	FW	(France)	Youssouf Niakaté	1	0	1
5	24	MF	(Saudi Arabia)	Nawaf Hazazi	1	0	1
5	32	DF	(Democratic Republic of the Congo)	Marcel Tisserand	1	0	1
Total					21	0	21

Last Updated: 31 May 2023

=== Clean sheets ===
Rank	No.	Pos	Nat	Name	Pro League	King Cup	Total
1	48	GK	(Brazil)	Paulo Victor	10	0	10
Total					10	0	10

Last Updated: 31 May 2023
