= Naïm Sliti =

Footballer (born 1992)

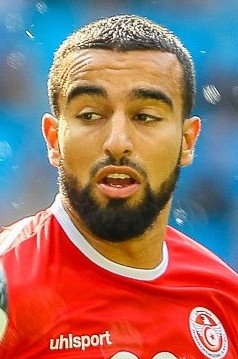
- Sliti with Tunisia at the 2018 FIFA World Cup

Personal information
- Full name: Naïm Sliti
- Date of birth: 27 July 1992 (age 34)
- Place of birth: Marseille, France
- Height: 1.73 m (5 ft 8 in)
- Position: Winger

Team information
- Current team: Al-Ahli

Youth career
- Marseille

Senior career*
Years	Team	Apps	(Gls)
2011–2013	Sedan	48	(3)
2010–2013	Sedan B	15	(6)
2013–2014	Paris B	14	(9)
2013–2014	Paris	4	(0)
2014–2017	Red Star	68	(12)
2016–2017	→ Lille (loan)	16	(1)
2017–2018	Lille	0	(0)
2017–2018	→ Dijon (loan)	31	(7)
2018–2019	Dijon	35	(3)
2019–2023	Al-Ettifaq	80	(21)
2023–2024	Al-Ahli	16	(10)
2024–2026	Al Shamal	27	(0)
2026–	Al-Ahli	0	(0)

International career^{‡}
2016–2026	Tunisia	84	(16)
Medal record
Representing Tunisia
Men's football
FIFA Arab Cup
Runner-up	2021 Qatar
- * Club domestic league appearances and goals as of 27 April 2026 ‡ National team caps and goals as of 19 December 2025

Naïm Sliti (Arabic: نعيم سليتي; born 27 July 1992) is a professional footballer who plays as a winger for Al-Ahli. Born in France, he plays for the Tunisia national team.

== International career ==
Sliti was born in Marseille, France, to Tunisian parents. He made his debut for the Tunisia national team in a 2017 Africa Cup of Nations qualification 3–0 victory against Djibouti on 3 June 2016, wherein he scored his debut goal.

In June 2018 he was selected in the final 23-man squad for the 2018 FIFA World Cup in Russia.

== Career statistics ==
=== Club ===
As of match played 28 December 2023

Appearances and goals by club, season and competition
Club	Season	League			National cup (Note: Includes Coupe de France, King Cup)		League cup (Note: Includes Coupe de la Ligue)		Other		Total	
Club	Season	Division	Apps	Goals	Apps	Goals	Apps	Goals	Apps	Goals	Apps	Goals
Sedan B	2010–11	CFA2	8	5	–		–		–		8	5
Sedan B	2011–12	CFA2	2	1	–		–		–		2	1
Sedan B	2012–13	CFA2	5	0	–		–		–		5	0
Sedan B	Total		15	6	–		–		–		15	6
Sedan	2011–12	Ligue 2	28	2	2	0	2	0	–		32	2
Sedan	2012–13	Ligue 2	20	1	4	0	0	0	–		24	1
Sedan	Total		48	3	6	0	2	0	–		56	3
Paris B	2013–14	CFA2	14	9	–		–		–		14	9
Paris	2013–14	Championnat National	4	0	–		–		–		4	0
Red Star	2014–15	Championnat National	28	8	3	0	0	0	–		31	8
Red Star	2015–16	Ligue 2	38	4	0	0	1	0	–		39	4
Red Star	2016–17	Ligue 2	2	2	0	0	0	0	–		2	2
Red Star	Total		68	14	3	0	1	0	–		72	14
Lille	2016–17	Ligue 1	16	1	1	0	1	0	–		18	1
Lille B	2016–17	CFA	3	2	–		–		–		3	2
Dijon	2017–18	Ligue 1	31	7	1	0	1	0	–		33	7
Dijon	2018–19	Ligue 1	35	3	3	4	2	1	2 (Note: Appearances in Ligue 1 relegation play-offs)	2	42	10
Dijon	Total		66	10	4	4	3	1	2	2	75	17
Al-Ettifaq	2019-20	Saudi Pro League	19	2	3	2	–		–		22	4
Al-Ettifaq	2020–21	Saudi Pro League	28	9	1	0	–		–		29	9
Al-Ettifaq	2021–22	Saudi Pro League	22	9	1	0	–		–		23	9
Al-Ettifaq	2022–23	Saudi Pro League	11	1	1	0	–		–		12	1
Al-Ettifaq	Total		80	21	6	2	–		–		86	23
Al Ahli	2023–24	Qatar Stars League	10	8	0	0	3	1	–		13	9
Career total			333	74	20	6	10	2	2	2	365	84

=== International ===
As of match played 13 October 2025

Appearances and goals by national team and year
National team	Year	Apps	Goals
Tunisia	2016	3	1
Tunisia	2017	11	2
Tunisia	2018	13	3
Tunisia	2019	14	5
Tunisia	2020	4	0
Tunisia	2021	14	2
Tunisia	2022	12	1
Tunisia	2023	4	0
Tunisia	2024	2	0
Tunisia	2025	7	2
Total		84	16

International goals

Scores and results list Tunisia's goal tally first, score column indicates score after each Sliti goal.

List of international goals scored by Naïm Sliti
No.	Date	Venue	Cap	Opponent	Score	Result	Competition
1	3 June 2016	Stade du Ville, Djibouti, Djibouti	1	Djibouti	1–0	3–0	2017 Africa Cup of Nations qualification
2	19 January 2017	Stade de Franceville, Franceville, Gabon	7	Algeria	2–0	2–1	2017 Africa Cup of Nations
3	23 January 2017	Stade de l'Amitié, Libreville, Gabon	8	Zimbabwe	1–0	4–2	2017 Africa Cup of Nations
4	9 September 2018	Mavuso Sports Centre, Manzini, Swaziland	23	Swaziland	2–0	2–0	2019 Africa Cup of Nations qualification
5	16 November 2018	Borg El Arab Stadium, Alexandria, Egypt	26	Egypt	1–0	2–3	2019 Africa Cup of Nations qualification
6	16 November 2018	Borg El Arab Stadium, Alexandria, Egypt	26	Egypt	2–2	2–3	2019 Africa Cup of Nations qualification
7	22 March 2019	Stade Olympique de Radès, Radès, Tunisia	28	Eswatini	3–0	4–0	2019 Africa Cup of Nations qualification
8	11 June 2019	Gradski stadion Varaždin, Varaždin, Croatia	30	Croatia	2–1	2–1	Friendly
9	17 June 2019	Stade Olympique de Radès, Radès, Tunisia	31	Burundi	2–1	2–1	Friendly
10	11 July 2019	Al Salam Stadium, Cairo, Egypt	36	Madagascar	3–0	3–0	2019 Africa Cup of Nations
11	10 September 2019	Stade Robert Diochon, Rouen, France	40	Ivory Coast	1–2	1–2	Friendly
12	5 June 2021	Stade Olympique de Radès, Radès, Tunisia	47	DR Congo	1–0	1–0	Friendly
13	2 June 2022	Stade Hammadi Agrebi, Tunis, Tunisia	65	Equatorial Guinea	1–0	4–0	2023 Africa Cup of Nations qualification
14	16 November 2022	Ahmad bin Ali Stadium, Al Rayyan, Qatar	69	Iran	2–0	2–0	Friendly
15	18 December 2025	Tabarka Training Center, Tabarka, Tunisia	84	Botswana	1–1	2–1	Friendly
16	18 December 2025	Tabarka Training Center, Tabarka, Tunisia	84	Botswana	2–1	2–1	Friendly

== Honours ==
Tunisia

- Africa Cup of Nations fourth place: 2019
- Kirin Cup Soccer: 2022

Individual

- Saudi Pro League Player of the Month: December 2020, November 2021, May & June 2022
