= Robin Quaison =

Swedish footballer (born 1993)

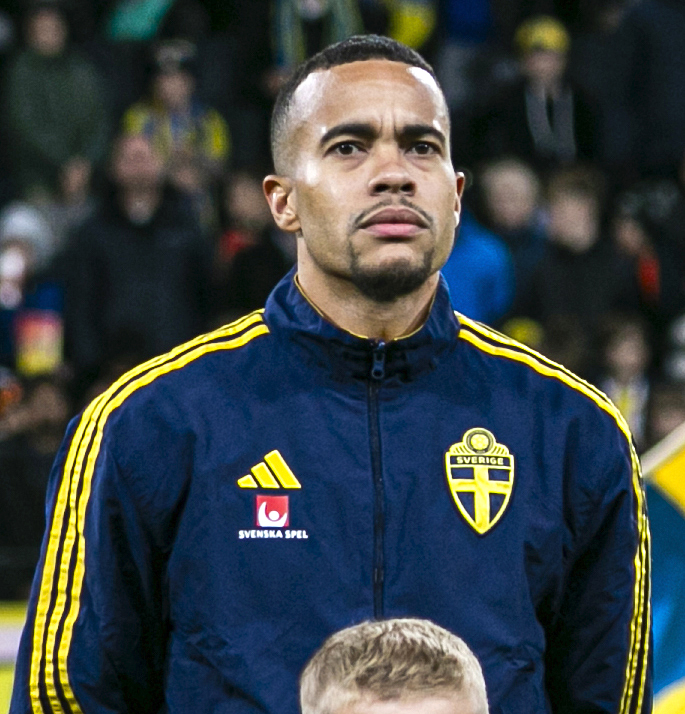
- Quaison with Sweden in 2023

Personal information
- Full name: Robin Kwamina Quaison
- Date of birth: 9 October 1993 (age 33)
- Place of birth: Stockholm, Sweden
- Height: 1.83 m (6 ft 0 in)
- Positions: Forward; attacking midfielder

Team information
- Current team: Gulf United
- Number: 7

Youth career
- 1997–2010: AIK

Senior career*
Years	Team	Apps	(Gls)
2011–2014	AIK	51	(7)
2011	→ Väsby United (loan)	17	(8)
2014–2017	Palermo	66	(7)
2017–2021	Mainz 05	123	(31)
2021–2024	Al-Ettifaq	65	(16)
2024–2025	Aris	11	(0)
2026–	Gulf United	0	(0)

International career^{‡}
2012	Sweden U19	2	(0)
2012–2016	Sweden U21/O	20	(1)
2013–2023	Sweden	52	(14)
Medal record
Men's football
Representing Sweden
UEFA European Under-21 Championship
Winner	2015 Czech Republic
- * Club domestic league appearances and goals as of 30 August 2025 ‡ National team caps and goals as of 17:08, 20 November 2023 (UTC)

Robin Kwamina Quaison (/ˈkweɪsən/, KWAY-sən; born 9 October 1993) is a Swedish professional footballer who plays UAE First Division League side Gulf United as a forward, attacking midfielder or left winger.

== Early life ==
Born in Stockholm to a Ghanaian father and a Swedish mother, he is childhood friends with rapper Dree Low.

== Club career ==
Quaison started his professional career in 2011 on loan at Väsby United.

=== AIK ===
Quaison joined AIK in 1997. He made his first match for AIK on 1 April 2012, as a substitute in a 0–0 draw against Mjällby. He scored his first goal on 20 May the same year, in a 5–2 victory against IFK Norrköping. His second goal came in the 3–1 win against BK Häcken on 8 July 2012.

He made UEFA Europa League his debut in a 4–0 loss to Napoli on 20 September 2012 before going on to playing a further five times in the Europa League cup run. He received the first red card of his career against Halmstads BK in a 3–3 draw. He finished his second season making 28 appearances in all competitions.

On 6 August 2013, Quaison scored a long-distance goal against Manchester United in a 1–1 draw during a pre-season friendly.

=== Palermo ===
In July 2014 Quaison moved to the Serie A club Palermo, signing a three-year contract, having been previously linked with Stoke City, Leeds and QPR.

=== Mainz 05 ===
On 31 January 2017, Quaison signed a 4.5-year contract with Bundesliga side Mainz 05.

On 17 December 2019, Quaison scored his first career hat-trick in a 5–0 Bundesliga victory over Werder Bremen.

On 16 May 2021, Quaison scored the sole Mainz goal, a second-half stoppage time penalty, in a 3–1 Bundesliga loss to Borussia Dortmund, for his thirtieth goal for the club. In doing so, he became the sole all-time top Bundesliga goalscorer for Mainz, breaking a tie with Yunus Mallı and Mohamed Zidan.

=== Al Ettifaq ===
In July 2021, Quaison signed a contract with Saudi Pro League club Al Ettifaq.

On 21 August 2021, Quaison scored his first goal for his new club in a 3–3 draw against Al-Shabab.

=== Aris ===
On 23 September 2024, Quaison signed a two year contract with the Greek Super League 1 club, Aris Thessaloniki.

He played his first match for the club on 5 October 2024 when he came in from the bench in the 87th minute in a 2-0 win over Lamia.

On 22 April 2025 and again on 22 August 2025, Swedish media reported that the club wanted to cancel Quaison’s contract. In both cases they cited Greek newspaper Gazzetta as a source. On neither of these occasions was an official statement made by the club or player.

On 22 December 2025, Swedish newspaper Expressen reported that Quaison and his former club, AIK had been in touch with each other about a possible return to Sweden.

=== Gulf United ===
On 6 February 2026, Quaison signed a contract with UAE First Division League club Gulf United.

== International career ==
On 23 January 2013, Quaison made his debut for the Sweden national team, against North Korea in the 2013 King's Cup. Three days later he scored his first goal for Sweden in a 3–0 victory against Finland in the final of the tournament.

In 2015, Quaison was part of the Sweden U21 team that won the UEFA European Under-21 Championship in the Czech Republic. He made four appearances during the tournament, coming on as a substitute in each, and scored one goal in the semi-finals against Denmark.

In 2016, he competed for the Sweden Olympic team at the 2016 Summer Olympics.

In March 2019, Quaison made his competitive Sweden national team debut as he played in the first two rounds of the Euro 2020 qualifiers. Quaison had a successful debut, scoring one goal against Romania in a 2–1 win, and following that up with one goal against rivals Norway in a 3–3 draw. In total, Quaison scored five goals as Sweden qualified for Euro 2020.

He was part of Sweden's squad at UEFA Euro 2020 that reached the round of 16 before being eliminated by Ukraine.

== Personal life ==
In 2021, to coincide with the rescheduled UEFA Euro 2020, the Quaison Foundation was set up by the player and four other childhood friends. Their aim was to provide support for young people in the Järva borough of Stockholm where the player himself had grown up. One initiative was to give out 8000 Christmas presents, including pens and sports clothes, to school children in the area. The suburb has a history of social deprivation and featured on the Police’s 2021 list of vulnerable areas.

== Career statistics ==
=== Club ===
As of match played 22 September 2023

Appearances and goals by club, season and competition
Club	Season	League			National cup (Note: Includes Svenska Cupen, Coppa Italia, DFB-Pokal, King Cup)		Continental		Other		Total	
Club	Season	Division	Apps	Goals	Apps	Goals	Apps	Goals	Apps	Goals	Apps	Goals
Väsby United (loan)	2011	Division 1 Norra	17	8	—		—		1 (Note: Appearance in Division 1 Norra relegation play-offs)	0	18	8
AIK	2012	Allsvenskan	18	2	1	0	7 (Note: Appearances in UEFA Europa League)	0	1 (Note: Appearance in Svenska Supercupen)	0	27	2
AIK	2013	Allsvenskan	23	4	3	1	—		—		26	5
AIK	2014	Allsvenskan	10	1	0	0	—		—		10	1
AIK	Total		51	7	4	1	7	0	2	0	63	8
Palermo	2014–15	Serie A	19	2	1	0	—		—		20	2
Palermo	2015–16	Serie A	30	1	2	1	—		—		32	2
Palermo	2016–17	Serie A	17	4	1	0	—		—		18	4
Palermo	Total		66	7	4	1	–		–		70	8
Mainz 05	2016–17	Bundesliga	11	1	—		—		—		11	1
Mainz 05	2017–18	Bundesliga	24	4	2	0	—		—		26	4
Mainz 05	2018–19	Bundesliga	28	7	2	2	—		—		30	9
Mainz 05	2019–20	Bundesliga	32	13	1	0	—		—		33	13
Mainz 05	2020–21	Bundesliga	28	6	2	1	–		–		30	7
Mainz 05	Total		123	31	7	3	–		–		130	34
Al-Ettifaq	2021–22	Saudi Pro League	21	7	1	0	–		–		22	7
Al-Ettifaq	2022–23	Saudi Pro League	26	6	1	0	–		–		27	6
Al-Ettifaq	2023–24	Saudi Pro League	7	3	0	0	–		–		7	3
Al-Ettifaq	Total		54	16	2	0	–		–		56	16
Career total			311	69	17	5	7	0	2	0	337	75

=== International ===
As of match played 19 November 2023

Appearances and goals by national team and year
National team	Year	Apps	Goals
Sweden	2013	2	1
Sweden	2014	2	1
Sweden	2015	1	0
Sweden	2016	0	0
Sweden	2017	0	0
Sweden	2018	1	0
Sweden	2019	9	5
Sweden	2020	6	1
Sweden	2021	16	3
Sweden	2022	9	1
Sweden	2023	6	2
Total		52	14

Scores and results list Sweden's goal tally first.

List of international goals scored by Robin Quaison
No.	Date	Venue	Opponent	Score	Result	Competition
1.	26 January 2013	700th Anniversary Stadium, Chiang Mai, Thailand	Finland	2–0	3–0	2013 King's Cup
2.	21 January 2014	Mohammed bin Zayed Stadium, Abu Dhabi, United Arab Emirates	Iceland	1–0	2–0	Friendly
3.	23 March 2019	Friends Arena, Solna, Sweden	Romania	1–0	2–1	UEFA Euro 2020 qualifying
4.	26 March 2019	Ullevaal Stadion, Oslo, Norway	Norway	3–2	3–3	UEFA Euro 2020 qualifying
5.	7 June 2019	Friends Arena, Solna, Sweden	Malta	1–0	3–0	UEFA Euro 2020 qualifying
6.	5 September 2019	Tórsvøllur, Tórshavn, Faroe Islands	Faroe Islands	4–0	4–0	UEFA Euro 2020 qualifying
7.	15 November 2019	Arena Națională, Bucharest, Romania	Romania	2–0	2–0	UEFA Euro 2020 qualifying
8.	17 November 2020	Stade de France, Saint-Denis, France	France	2–3	2–4	2020–21 UEFA Nations League A
9.	29 May 2021	Friends Arena, Solna, Sweden	Finland	1–0	2–0	Friendly
10.	8 September 2021	Olympic Stadium, Athens, Greece	Greece	1–2	1–2	2022 FIFA World Cup qualification
11.	9 October 2021	Friends Arena, Solna, Sweden	Kosovo	3–0	3–0	2022 FIFA World Cup qualification
12.	24 March 2022	Friends Arena, Solna, Sweden	Czech Republic	1–0	1–0 (a.e.t.)	2022 FIFA World Cup qualification
13.	16 June 2023	Friends Arena, Solna, Sweden	New Zealand	2–1	4–1	Friendly
14.	9 September 2023	Lilleküla Stadium, Tallinn, Estonia	Estonia	4–0	5–0	UEFA Euro 2024 qualifying

== Honours ==
Sweden U21

- UEFA European Under-21 Championship: 2015
