= Abdullah Al-Khateeb =

Saudi Arabian footballer (born 1995)

Abdullah Al-Khateeb عبد الله الخطيب
Personal information
- Full name: Abdullah Ahmed Al-Khateeb
- Date of birth: 12 March 1995 (age 31)
- Place of birth: Jeddah, Saudi Arabia
- Height: 1.86 m (6 ft 1 in)
- Position: Defender

Team information
- Current team: Al-Ettifaq
- Number: 70

Youth career
- –2017: Al-Ahli

Senior career*
Years	Team	Apps	(Gls)
2017–2019	Al-Ahli	0	(0)
2017–2019	→ Al-Khaleej (loan)	55	(2)
2019–	Al-Ettifaq	143	(3)

International career^{‡}
2017–2018	Saudi Arabia U23		
2026–	Saudi Arabia	1	(0)
- * Club domestic league appearances and goals as of 31 October 2026 ‡ National team caps and goals as of 17 November 2026

Abdullah Al-Khateeb (Arabic: عبد الله الخطيب, born 12 March 1995) is a Saudi Arabian professional footballer who plays as a defender for Pro League side Al-Ettifaq and the Saudi Arabia national team.

== Career ==
Al-Khateeb began his career at the youth teams of Al-Ahli. On 24 July 2017, Al-Khateeb joined MS League side Al-Khaleej on loan for the 2017–18 season. On 17 August 2018, Al-Khateeb's loan to Al-Khaleej was renewed for the 2018–19 season. On 21 August 2019, Al-Khateeb signed a three-year contract with Al-Ettifaq. On 30 April 2021, Al-Khateeb renewed his contract with Al-Ettifaq until the end of the 2025–26 season.

== Career statistics ==
=== Club ===
As of match played 31 May 2024

Club	Season	League		King Cup		Asia		Other		Total	
Club	Season	Apps	Goals	Apps	Goals	Apps	Goals	Apps	Goals	Apps	Goals
Al-Khaleej (loan)	2017–18	28	2	1	0	—		—		29	2
Al-Khaleej (loan)	2018–19	27	0	1	0	—		2 (Note: Appearances in promotion play-offs)	0	30	0
Al-Khaleej (loan)	Total	55	2	2	0	0	0	2	0	59	2
Al-Ettifaq	2019–20	12	0	1	0	—		—		13	0
Al-Ettifaq	2020–21	10	0	0	0	—		—		10	0
Al-Ettifaq	2021–22	21	0	1	0	—		—		22	0
Al-Ettifaq	2022–23	22	0	1	0	—		—		23	0
Al-Ettifaq	2023–24	30	0	1	0	—		—		31	0
Al-Ettifaq	Total	95	0	4	0	0	0	0	0	99	0
Career totals		150	2	6	0	0	0	2	0	158	2
