= Fahad Al-Dossari (footballer, born 2002) =

Saudi Arabian footballer

Personal information
- Full name: Fahad Khalid Ali Al Wadaani Al-Dossari
- Date of birth: 1 January 2002 (age 24)
- Place of birth: Dammam, Saudi Arabia
- Height: 1.76 m (5 ft 9 in)
- Positions: Winger; left back

Team information
- Current team: Al-Faisaly
- Number: 97

Youth career
- Al-Ettifaq

Senior career*
Years	Team	Apps	(Gls)
2020–2023	Al-Ettifaq	8	(0)
2023	→ Al-Kholood (loan)	3	(0)
2023–2024	Al-Orobah	26	(3)
2024–2026	Al-Diriyah	37	(0)
2026–	Al-Faisaly	0	(0)

International career
2017–2019	Saudi Arabia U17		
2019–2022	Saudi Arabia U20		
- * Club domestic league appearances and goals as of 31 May 2024

Fahad Al-Dossari (Arabic: فهد الدوسري; born 1 January 2002) is a Saudi Arabian professional footballer who plays for Al-Faisaly as a winger or a left back.

== Career ==
Al-Dossari started his career at the youth team of Al-Ettifaq and represented the club at every level. On 11 October 2020, he signed his first professional contract with the club. He was first called up to the first-team during the 2020–21 season. He made his debut on 25 May 2021 in the league match against Al-Raed. On 28 January 2023, Al-Dossari joined Al-Kholood on loan. In September 2023, Al-Dossari joined Al-Orobah following the expiration of his contract with Al-Ettifaq. On 26 July 2024, Al-Dossari joined Second Division side Al-Diriyah. On 31 January 2026, Al-Dossari joined Al-Faisaly.

== Career statistics ==
=== Club ===
As of 30 May 2024

Club	Season	League		King Cup		Asia		Other		Total	
Club	Season	Apps	Goals	Apps	Goals	Apps	Goals	Apps	Goals	Apps	Goals
Al-Ettifaq	2020–21	1	0	0	0	—		—		1	0
Al-Ettifaq	2021–22	5	0	0	0	—		—		5	0
Al-Ettifaq	2022–23	2	0	0	0	—		—		2	0
Al-Ettifaq	Total	8	0	0	0	0	0	0	0	8	0
Al-Kholood (loan)	2022–23	3	0	0	0	—		—		3	0
Al-Orobah	2023–24	26	3	1	0	—		—		27	3
Career totals		37	3	1	0	0	0	0	0	38	3
