= Raïs M'Bolhi =

Algerian footballer (born 1986)

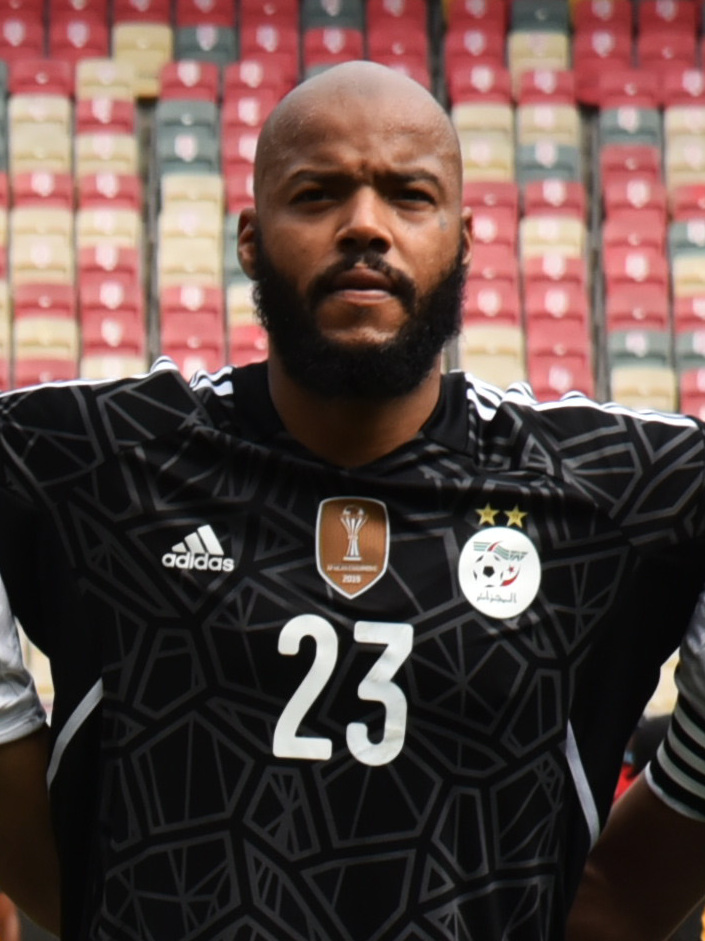
- M'Bolhi with Algeria in 2022

Personal information
- Full name: Adi Raïs Cobos Adrien Ouahab M'Bolhi
- Date of birth: 25 April 1986 (age 40)
- Place of birth: Paris, France
- Height: 1.90 m (6 ft 3 in)
- Position: Goalkeeper

Youth career
- 1995–2002: Racing Paris
- 2002–2003: Marseille

Senior career*
Years	Team	Apps	(Gls)
2003–2005	Marseille B	49	(0)
2005–2006	Heart of Midlothian	0	(0)
2006–2007	Ethnikos Piraeus	5	(0)
2007–2008	Panetolikos	8	(0)
2008–2009	Ryūkyū	22	(0)
2009–2010	Slavia Sofia	27	(0)
2010	→ CSKA Sofia (loan)	10	(0)
2010–2013	Krylia Sovetov	17	(0)
2011–2012	→ CSKA Sofia (loan)	28	(0)
2013	→ Gazélec Ajaccio (loan)	12	(0)
2013–2014	CSKA Sofia	17	(0)
2014–2015	Philadelphia Union	9	(0)
2015–2017	Antalyaspor	12	(0)
2017	Rennes	1	(0)
2018–2022	Al-Ettifaq	104	(0)
2022–2023	Al-Qadsiah	31	(0)
2023–2024	CR Belouizdad	6	(0)
2025–2026	ES Mostaganem	7	(0)
Total		303	(0)

International career
2002–2003	France U17	3	(0)
2004	France U18	4	(0)
2010–2024	Algeria	96	(0)

Managerial career
- 2026: Lebanon (goalkeeper)
Medal record
Men's football
Representing Algeria
FIFA Arab Cup
Winner	2021 Qatar
Africa Cup of Nations
Winner	2019 Egypt
- * Club domestic league appearances and goals

Adi Raïs Cobos Adrien Ouahab M'Bolhi (Arabic: عدي رايس كوبوس أدريان وهاب مبولحي; born 25 April 1986), known as Raïs M'Bolhi, is a professional football coach and former player. Born in France, he played as a goalkeeper for the Algeria national team.

== Club career ==
=== Early career ===
M'Bolhi, who hails of Congolese (father) and Algerian (mother) origin, started playing football for RCF Paris. Then, he joined Olympique de Marseille, though he never made a league appearance before his release in January 2006.

After his release from Marseille, M'Bolhi was promptly recruited by Heart of Midlothian, one of 11 signings in the January transfer window. However, along with fellow new buys with Luděk Stracený and Martin Petras, he was not retained for the 2006–07 season and left the club without having made a first-team appearance.

Prior to the 2006–07 season M'Bolhi signed with Greek club Ethnikos Piraeus, then competing in Beta Ethniki. M'Bolhi made 5 appearances for Ethnikos before leaving in the winter transfer period for Greek club Panetolikos, then competing in Gamma Ethniki.

In 2008 M'Bolhi played 22 matches for F.C. Ryūkyū in Japan Football League.

=== Slavia Sofia ===
In May 2009, Bulgarian Slavia Sofia signed M'Bolhi to a two-year deal. He made his competitive debut for Slavia on 14 June 2009 against Lokomotiv Sofia. In January 2010, M'Bohli was named the 2009 Best Goalkeeper of A PFG. The fans organization of Slavia named him the best player of the 2009–2010 season.

On 6 May 2010, M'Bohli joined on a two-day trial with English champions Manchester United, but was ultimately not selected to play on the squad. On 23 June 2010, English club Newcastle United reportedly put in a bid for him for £1million. On 22 July he was training with West Ham in their summer training camp in Germany.

=== CSKA Sofia loan ===
He was loaned out to CSKA Sofia on 30 August 2010, until the end of the year. After some unstable performance from Ivan Karadzhov and Zdravko Chavdarov, M'Bolhi was expected to be the first choice goalkeeper for the rest of the first half of the season and the group stage of UEFA Europa League and he indeed established himself as the main goalkeeper for the "redmen". M'Bolhi did not play against his parent team Slavia Sofia in the seventh round of the Bulgaria A PFG due to a special clause in the loan agreement.

=== Krylia Sovetov ===
On 16 December 2010, M'Bolhi was transferred to Russian side Krylia Sovetov Samara, signing a three-and-a-half-year contract. His debut came on 12 March 2011, in the 1–0 away loss against Spartak Nalchik, with the only goal being scored from the penalty spot. After the signing of Sergey Veremko, M'Bolhi found himself out of the first team.

=== CSKA Sofia loan ===
He was loaned out to CSKA Sofia for a second time on 2 August 2011, for a year, and was first choice for the team, but was then recalled by the Russian club. During the summer of 2012, M'Bolhi briefly returned to CSKA Sofia with the intention of signing a permanent contract with the team. However, he was deemed surplus to the requirements by the manager following the team's elimination from the UEFA Europa League by Slovenian club Mura 05 in late July 2012 (despite the Algerian not participating in these matches).

He was back to Krylia Sovetov and trained with youth team. He was later called up to the Algerian national team for the 2013 Africa Cup of Nations.

=== Gazélec Ajaccio loan ===
In mid January 2013, M'Bolhi was loaned out to Ligue 2 club Gazélec Ajaccio. He made his debut on 1 February 2013, in the 0–2 away loss against RC Lens. His team was relegated to the Championnat National at the end of the season and he rejoined CSKA Sofia in the summer of 2013, signing a three-year contract.

=== CSKA Sofia (third spell) ===
M'Bolhi was initially the third choice goalkeeper for the "armymen", but started to feature more often towards the end of 2013 after Tomáš Černý fell into disfavour. On 8 March 2014, M'Bolhi kept a clean sheet in the 1–0 win over Levski Sofia in The Eternal Derby, but was sent off in the closing minutes of the match after an altercation with Larsen Touré where M'Bolhi smashed the ball on Touré's head. He continued to be a regular for Algeria.

=== Philadelphia Union ===
On 30 July 2014, M'Bolhi was unveiled as a new signing of Major League Soccer club Philadelphia Union. M'Bohli had previously been linked to Trabzonspor, where he could have joined manager Vahid Halilhodžić and team-mate Carl Medjani.

However, his debut was delayed until 25 August (a 4–2 home win over San Jose Earthquakes) after he was involved in a car accident in Paris, France and had to resolve paperwork issues. M'Bolhi was presented with number 92 shirt for the club.

However, as of 8 April, M'Bolhi was benched by the Union's head coach, Jim Curtin, citing poor performance during the Philadelphia Union vs. Sporting Kansas City game on 5 April.

After playing in only nine matches in the 2015 season, head coach Jim Curtin said that M'Bolhi would never play again for Philadelphia. M'Bolhi is considered one of the worst signings in the club's history.

=== Antalyaspor ===
On 24 August 2015, M'Bolhi signed for Turkish club Antalyaspor.

=== Rennes ===
On 11 January 2017, M'Bolhi decided to sign a contract with French top flight club Stade Rennais, rejoining his former national team manager Christian Gourcuff.

=== Al-Ettifaq ===
On 19 January 2018, M'Bolhi joined Saudi Arabian club Al-Ettifaq on a six-month deal. On 6 March 2018, M'Bolhi renewed his contract with Al-Ettifaq until the end of the 2020–21 season. On 25 January 2019, M'Bolhi renewed his contract until 2022. On 30 June 2022, Al-Ettifaq announced that M'Bolhi had left the club following the expiration of his contract.

=== Al-Qadsiah ===
On 9 September 2022, M'Bolhi joined Saudi First Division League side Al-Qadsiah, reuniting with former manager Khaled Al-Atwi.

=== CR Belouizdad ===
On 1 September 2023, M'Bolhi joined CR Belouizdad.

== International career ==
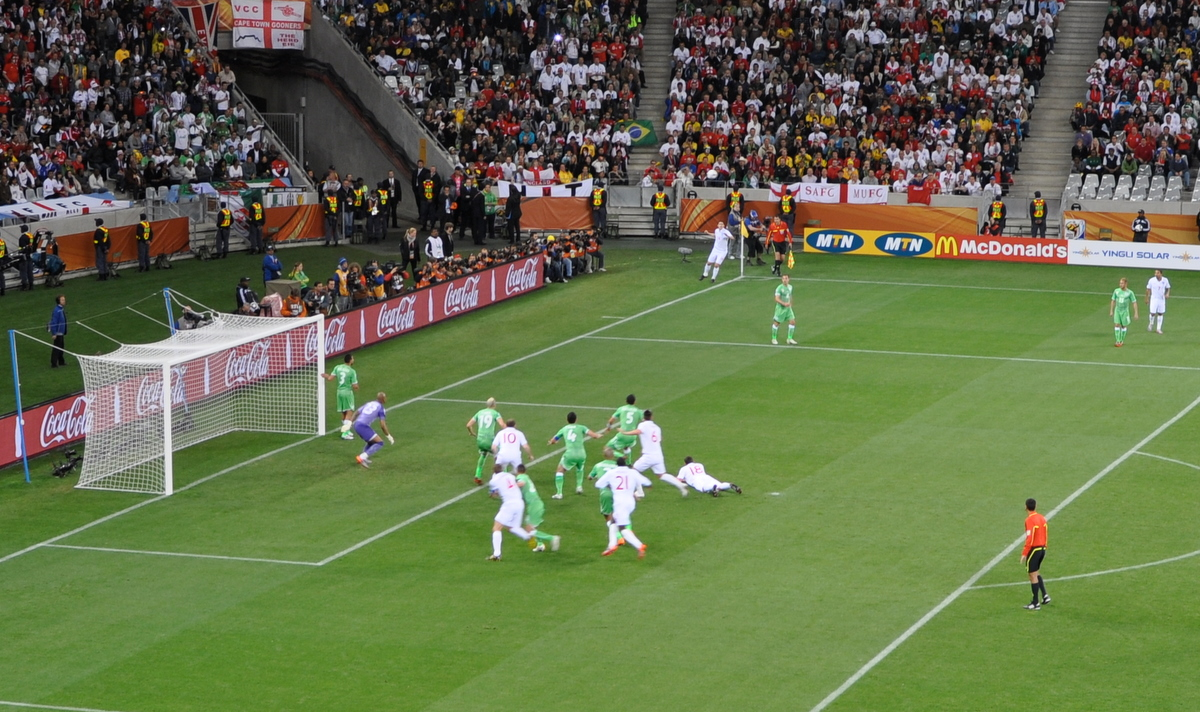
M'Bolhi in goal against England at the 2010 FIFA World Cup.

He earned his first call-up to the France U-17 national team in November 2002 for a friendly match against England. In 2003, he was called up for two more friendlies against Portugal and the Czech Republic.

In June 2004, he received his first and only call-up to the France U-18 team for a friendly tournament in Salerno, Italy.

Subsequently, he was called up to the Algerian U-17 team but was not released by his club Olympique de Marseille.

On 28 May 2010, M'Bohli made his debut for Algeria in a 3–0 loss against the Republic of Ireland after coming on as a second-half substitute. He conceded one goal, a penalty scored by Robbie Keane. He made the 23-man Algerian squad for the 2010 FIFA World Cup and replaced Faouzi Chaouchi as starting goalkeeper for the second group match against England, keeping a clean sheet and impressing in the goalless draw. However, he conceded a goal to Landon Donovan in the 91st minute of Algeria's 23 June match-up against the United States

On 11 August 2010, M'Bolhi earned his fourth cap in a 1–2 friendly loss to Gabon.

He was also chosen as the starting goalkeeper for the first two games of the 2012 Africa Cup of Nations qualification and featured in 2014 World Cup qualification matches.

On 9 September 2012, M'Bolhi was a key player for Algeria in a 1–0 away win over Libya in a 2013 Africa Cup of Nations qualification match. He was the first choice custodian for the country during the 2013 Africa Cup of Nations.

M'Bolhi was Algeria's starting goalkeeper at the 2014 FIFA World Cup, where the Algerians managed to qualify to the knockout rounds for the first time in history. His performance in the round of 16 against Germany, with a total of 11 saves, helped push the game into overtime. Algeria eventually lost 2–1, but M'Bolhi earned man of the match honors.

M’Bolhi won his first title with Algeria at the 2019 Africa Cup of Nations. He was Algeria's starting goalkeeper as he started every game of Algeria's tournament winning run and played every minute of the competition for Algeria. Moreover, he was named as "Man of the Match" against Senegal in the Final and was named the best goalkeeper of the tournament.

In December 2023, he was named in Algeria's squad for the 2023 Africa Cup of Nations.

== Managerial career ==
In May 2026, M’Bolhi was appointed goalkeeper coach of the Lebanon national team, as part of Madjid Bougherra's technical staff.

== Personal life ==
M’Bolhi's mother, Aïsha, died in 2010. Since then, he has worn gloves on which her name is inscribed on one pair, while "Raïs" is written on another pair.

== Career statistics ==
=== Club ===
Appearances and goals by club, season and competition
Club	Season	League			Cup		League Cup		Continental		Total	
Club	Season	Division	Apps	Goals	Apps	Goals	Apps	Goals	Apps	Goals	Apps	Goals
Hearts	2005–06	Scottish Premier League	0	0	0	0	—		—		0	0
Ethnikos Piraeus	2006–07	Beta Ethniki	5	0	0	0	—		—		5	0
Panetolikos	2007–08	Beta Ethniki	8	0	0	0	—		—		8	0
Ryūkyū	2008	Japan Football League	22	0	0	0	—		—		22	0
Slavia Sofia	2008–09	A Group	1	0	0	0	—		—		1	0
Slavia Sofia	2009–10	A Group	25	0	3	0	—		—		28	0
Slavia Sofia	2010–11	A Group	1	0	—		—		—		1	0
Slavia Sofia	Total		27	0	3	0	—		—		30	0
CSKA Sofia (loan)	2010–11	A Group	10	0	0	0	–		6	0	16	0
Krylia Sovetov	2011–12	Russian Premier League	17	0	0	0	—		—		17	0
CSKA Sofia (loan)	2011–12	A Group	28	0	2	0	—		2	0	32	0
Gazélec Ajaccio (loan)	2012–13	Ligue 2	12	0	—		—		—		12	0
CSKA Sofia	2013–14	A Group	17	0	2	0	—		—		19	0
Philadelphia Union	2014	MLS	4	0	0	0	—		—		4	0
Philadelphia Union	2015	MLS	5	0	0	0	—		—		5	0
Philadelphia Union	Total		1	0	0	0	—		—		1	0
Antalyaspor	2015–16	Süper Lig	12	0	7	0	—		—		19	0
Rennes	2016–17	Ligue 1	0	0	0	0	—		—		0	0
Rennes	2017–18	Ligue 1	1	0	—		0	0	—		1	0
Rennes	Total		1	0	0	0	0	0	—		1	0
Al-Ettifaq	2017–18	Saudi Pro League	9	0	0	0	—		—		9	0
Al-Ettifaq	2018–19	Saudi Pro League	22	0	1	0	—		—		23	0
Al-Ettifaq	2019–20	Saudi Pro League	28	0	3	0	—		—		31	0
Al-Ettifaq	2020–21	Saudi Pro League	18	0	1	0	—		—		19	0
Al-Ettifaq	2021–22	Saudi Pro League	27	0	1	0	—		—		28	0
Al-Ettifaq	Total		104	0	6	0	—		—		110	0
Al Qadsiah	2022–23	Saudi First Division	31	0	0	0	—		—		31	0
CR Belouizdad	2023–24	Algerian Ligue Professionnelle 1	6	0	0	0	0	0	2	0	8	0
Career total			303	0	20	0	0	0	10	0	333	0

=== International ===
As of match played 19 November 2022

Appearances and goals by national team and year
National team	Year	Apps	Goals
Algeria	2010	7	0
Algeria	2011	4	0
Algeria	2012	6	0
Algeria	2013	10	0
Algeria	2014	9	0
Algeria	2015	7	0
Algeria	2016	6	0
Algeria	2017	6	0
Algeria	2018	4	0
Algeria	2019	13	0
Algeria	2020	3	0
Algeria	2021	13	0
Algeria	2022	8	0
Total		96	0

== Honours ==
Algeria

- FIFA Arab Cup: 2021
- Africa Cup of Nations: 2019

Individual

- Best Algerian Goalkeeper: 2010, 2011, 2012, 2014
- Africa Cup of Nations Best Goalkeeper: 2019
- CAF AFCON Team of the Tournament: 2019
- Saudi Pro League Player of the Month: September 2018
- FIFA Arab Cup Golden Glove: 2021
- FIFA Arab Cup Team of the Tournament: 2021
