= Rayan Al-Bloushi =

Saudi Arabian footballer of Pakistani descent

Personal information
- Full name: Rayan Darwish Al-Bloushi
- Date of birth: 27 February 2001 (age 25)
- Place of birth: Dammam, Saudi Arabia
- Height: 1.77 m (5 ft 9 1/2 in)
- Position: Striker

Team information
- Current team: Al-Zulfi (on loan from Al-Riyadh)
- Number: 14

Youth career
- Al-Ettifaq

Senior career*
Years	Team	Apps	(Gls)
2020–2023	Al-Ettifaq	4	(0)
2021–2022	→ Al-Fayha (loan)	1	(0)
2023–2024	Al-Safa	16	(3)
2024–	Al-Riyadh	10	(0)
2025–2026	→ Al-Jabalain (loan)	7	(0)
2026–	→ Al-Zulfi (loan)	0	(0)

International career
2019–2021	Saudi Arabia U20		
2022–2023	Saudi Arabia U23		
- * Club domestic league appearances and goals as of 27 June 2022

Rayan Al-Bloushi (Arabic: ريان البلوشي; born 27 February 2001) is a Saudi Arabian professional footballer who plays as a striker for Al-Zulfi, on loan from Al-Riyadh.

== Career ==
Al-Bloushi started his career at the youth team of Al-Ettifaq and represented the club at every level. On 11 October 2020, he signed his first professional contract with the club. He was first called up to the first-team during the 2020–21 season. He made his debut on 10 April 2021 in the league match against derby rivals Al-Qadsiah. On 30 August 2021, Al-Bloushi joined Al-Fayha on loan. On 20 July 2023, Al-Bloushi joined First Division side Al-Safa. On 13 July 2024, Al-Bloushi joined Pro League side Al-Riyadh. On 12 September 2025, Al-Bloushi joined Al-Jabalain on loan.

== Career statistics ==
=== Club ===
As of 30 May 2024

Club	Season	League		King Cup		Asia		Other		Total	
Club	Season	Apps	Goals	Apps	Goals	Apps	Goals	Apps	Goals	Apps	Goals
Al-Ettifaq	2020–21	2	0	0	0	—		—		2	0
Al-Ettifaq	2022–23	2	0	0	0	—		—		2	0
Al-Ettifaq	Total	4	0	0	0	0	0	0	0	4	0
Al-Fayha (loan)	2021–22	1	0	0	0	—		—		1	0
Al-Safa	2023–24	16	3	—		—		—		16	3
Career totals		21	3	0	0	0	0	0	0	21	3

== Honours ==
=== Club ===
Al-Fayha

- King Cup: 2021–22

=== International ===
Saudi Arabia U23

- WAFF U-23 Championship: 2022
