= Hussein Halawani =

Saudi Arabian footballer

Hussein Halawani حسين حلواني
Personal information
- Full name: Hussein Ali Ibrahim Halawani
- Date of birth: January 6, 1996 (age 30)
- Place of birth: Saudi Arabia
- Height: 1.72 m (5 ft 8 in)
- Positions: Left winger; left-back

Team information
- Current team: Al-Jeel
- Number: 36

Youth career
- –2017: Al-Ittihad

Senior career*
Years	Team	Apps	(Gls)
2017–2019	Al-Ittihad	2	(0)
2018	→ Al-Batin (loan)	0	(0)
2018–2019	→ Al-Orobah (loan)	8	(0)
2019	Al-Tai	2	(0)
2019	Ohod	0	(0)
2019–2020	Najran	27	(1)
2020–2021	Al-Ettifaq	1	(0)
2021	→ Al-Ain (loan)	10	(1)
2021–2022	Al-Wehda	0	(0)
2022	Al-Khaleej	3	(0)
2022–2023	Hajer	15	(0)
2023–2024	Najran		
2024–2025	Al-Entesar		
2025–	Al-Jeel		
- * Club domestic league appearances and goals as of 15 May 2020

Hussein Halawani (Arabic: حسين حلواني, born 6 January 1996) is a Saudi Arabian professional footballer who plays as a left winger or left back for Al-Jeel.

== Career ==
Halawani started his career at the youth team of Al-Ittihad. He made his professional debut for Al-Ittihad on 4 May 2017, in the league match against Al-Fateh, replacing Ammar Al-Najar. on 19 January 2018 he joined Al-Batin on loan from Al-Ittihad. On 15 July 2018, he joined Al-Orobah on loan from Al-Ittihad. On 4 February 2019, his loan to Al-Orobah was ended early and Halawani joined Al-Tai on a permanent deal. On 23 July 2019, Halawani joined Ohod on a permanent deal. Despite making no appearances for the club, Halawani left Ohod on 2 September 2019 and joined Najran On 29 July 2020, Halawani joined Al-Ettifaq on a three-year deal. On 7 February 2021, Halawani was loaned out to fellow Pro League side Al-Ain until the end of the season. On 11 August 2021, Halawani joined Al-Wehda. On 30 January 2022, Halawani joined Al-Khaleej. On 3 July 2022, Halawani joined Hajer. On 21 January 2023, Halawani once again joined Najran. On 27 July 2024, Halawani joined Al-Entesar. On 26 August 2025, Halawani joined Al-Jeel.

== Honours ==
Al-Khaleej

- First Division: 2021–22
