= Hassan Al Salis =

Saudi Arabian footballer

Hassan Al Salis حسن آل سليس
Personal information
- Full name: Hassan Ali Ahmed Al Salis
- Date of birth: 5 July 2000 (age 26)
- Place of birth: Saudi Arabia
- Height: 1.81 m (5 ft 11 in)
- Position: Forward

Youth career
- Al-Taraji

Senior career*
Years	Team	Apps	(Gls)
2018–2020	Al-Taraji	-	(-)
2020–2022	Al-Ettifaq	11	(0)
2022–2025	Al-Fateh	10	(0)
2024	→ Al-Orobah (loan)	9	(1)
2025–2026	Abha	25	(5)

International career
2020–2022	Saudi Arabia U23		
- * Club domestic league appearances and goals as of 27 May 2024

Hassan Al Salis (Arabic: حسن آل سليس; born 5 July 2000) is a Saudi Arabian professional footballer who plays as a forward.

== Career ==
Al Salis started his career at the youth team of Al-Taraji and represented the club at every level. He was promoted to the first team during the 2018–19 season. On 30 June 2019, Al Salis was chosen in the scholarship program to develop football talents established by General Sports Authority in Saudi Arabia. On 21 July 2020, Al Salis joined Al-Ettifaq on a five-year deal. On 31 July 2022, Al Salis joined Al-Fateh on a four-year deal. On 31 January 2024, Al Salis joined Al-Orobah on a six-month loan. On 27 January 2025, Al Salis joined Abha.
