= Ali Hazazi =

Saudi Arabian footballer (born 1994)

Personal information
- Full name: Ali Abdullah Ali Hazazi
- Date of birth: 18 February 1994 (age 32)
- Place of birth: Dammam, Saudi Arabia
- Height: 1.82 m (6 ft 0 in)
- Position: Midfielder

Team information
- Current team: Al-Qadsiah
- Number: 11

Youth career
- Al-Qadsiah

Senior career*
Years	Team	Apps	(Gls)
2014–2018	Al-Qadsiah	45	(1)
2018–2024	Al-Ettifaq	157	(5)
2024–	Al-Qadsiah	50	(2)

International career^{‡}
2015–2017	Saudi Arabia U23		
2019–	Saudi Arabia	8	(0)
- * Club domestic league appearances and goals as of 14 May 2026 ‡ National team caps and goals as of 21 November 2023

Ali Abdullah Ali Hazazi (Arabic: علي عبد الله علي هزازي; born 18 February 1994) is a Saudi Arabian professional footballer who currently plays as a midfielder for Al-Qadsiah. He started playing for the Saudi Arabia national team in 2019.

== Career ==
Hazazi began his career at the youth setups of Al-Qadsiah before making his debut in the 2013–14 season. During the 2014–15 season, Hazazi made 17 appearances and scored once helping Al-Qadsiah win the First Division title and earn promotion to the Pro League.

On 5 July 2017, Hazazi joined rival club Al-Ettifaq on a free transfer. On 22 January 2019, Hazazi renewed his contract with Al-Ettifaq until the 2023–24 season. On 21 August 2023, Hazazi renewed his contract with Al-Ettifaq for another three years.

On 14 July 2024, Hazazi joined Al-Qadsiah on a three-year deal.

== Honours ==
Al-Qadsiah

- First Division: 2014–15
