= Hamad Al-Sayyaf =

Saudi Arabian footballer

Hamad Al-Sayyaf حمد السياف
Personal information
- Full name: Hamad Fayez Al-Sayyaf
- Date of birth: 18 January 2002 (age 24)
- Place of birth: Saudi Arabia
- Position: Defender

Team information
- Current team: Najran
- Number: 22

Youth career
- Al-Ettifaq

Senior career*
Years	Team	Apps	(Gls)
2020–2023	Al-Ettifaq	3	(0)
2022	→ Al-Sahel (loan)	6	(0)
2023–2025	Ohod	28	(2)
2025–	Najran		

International career
2022–2024	Saudi Arabia U23		
- * Club domestic league appearances and goals as of 22 May 2023

Hamad Al-Sayyaf (Arabic: حمد السياف; born 18 January 2002) is a Saudi Arabian professional footballer who plays as a defender for Najran.

== Career ==
Al-Sayyaf started his career at the youth team of Al-Ettifaq and represented the club at every level. On 11 October 2020, he signed his first professional contract with Al-Ettifaq. He made his first-team debut on 12 December 2020 in the league match against Damac. On 28 January 2022, Al-Sayyaf joined Al-Sahel on loan. On 5 September 2023, Al-Sayyaf joined Ohod on a three-year deal. On 1 October 2025, Al-Sayyaf joined Najran.

== Honours ==
=== International ===
Saudi Arabia U23

- WAFF U-23 Championship: 2022
