= Sanousi Hawsawi =

Saudi Arabian footballer

Sanousi Hawsawi سنوسي هوساوي
Personal information
- Full name: Sanousi Mohammed Hawsawi
- Date of birth: 8 October 1998 (age 28)
- Place of birth: Medina, Saudi Arabia
- Height: 1.72 m (5 ft 8 in)
- Position: Full-back

Team information
- Current team: Damac
- Number: 12

Youth career
- –2014: Ohod
- 2016–2018: Al-Ahli

Senior career*
Years	Team	Apps	(Gls)
2014–2016	Ohod	-	(5)
2018–2020	Al-Jabalain	46	(0)
2020–2023	Al-Ettifaq	69	(3)
2023–	Damac	0	(0)
- * Club domestic league appearances and goals as of 2 June 2023

Sanousi Hawsawi (Arabic: سنوسي هوساوي; born 8 October 1998) is a Saudi Arabian professional footballer who plays as a full-back for Saudi Professional League side Damac.

== Career ==
Hawsawi started his career at the youth team of Ohod and represented the club at every level. On 22 January 2016, he joined the youth team of Al-Ahli. On 29 July 2018, Hawsawi joined First Division club Al-Jabalain. On 1 October 2020, Hawsawi joined Pro League club Al-Ettifaq. On 27 June 2023, Hawsawi renewed his contract with Al-Ettifaq. On 8 September 2023, Hawsawi joined Damac.
