= Majed Al-Najrani =

Saudi Arabian footballer (born 1993)

Personal information
- Full name: Majed Abdullah Al-Najrani
- Date of birth: January 25, 1993 (age 33)
- Place of birth: Khobar, Saudi Arabia
- Height: 1.75 m (5 ft 9 in)
- Position: Attacking midfielder

Team information
- Current team: Al-Taraji
- Number: 15

Youth career
- Al-Qadsiah

Senior career*
Years	Team	Apps	(Gls)
2013–2016	Al-Qadsiah	68	(10)
2016–2019	Al-Hilal	8	(1)
2018–2019	→Al-Fayha (loan)	8	(0)
2019–2022	Al-Ettifaq	8	(0)
2023	Al-Kholood	8	(0)
2023–2025	Al-Sahel		
2025–	Al-Taraji		
- * Club domestic league appearances and goals as of 02:27, 1 September 2018 (UTC) ‡ National team caps and goals as of 02:27, 28 January 2016 (UTC)

Majed Al-Najrani (Arabic: ماجد النجراني, born 25 January 1993) is a Saudi Arabian professional footballer who plays as an attacking midfielder for Al-Taraji.

== Career ==
On 27 June 2016, Al-Najrani joined Al-Hilal on a four-year deal. On 23 August 2018, Al-Najrani joined Al-Fayha on a one-year loan.

On 18 June 2019, Al-Najrani joined Al-Ettifaq on a three-year deal.

On 30 December 2022, Al-Najrani joined Al-Kholood.

On 1 October 2025, Al-Najrani joined Al-Taraji.

== Honours ==
Al-Qadsiah

- First Division: 2014–15

Al-Hilal

- Saudi Professional League: 2016–17, 2017–18
- King Cup: 2017
