= Fahad Ghazi =

Saudi Arabian footballer

Personal information
- Full name: Fahad Ghazi Saeed Zahem
- Date of birth: 1 March 1994 (age 32)
- Place of birth: Saudi Arabia
- Position: Left-back

Youth career
- Al-Hilal

Senior career*
Years	Team	Apps	(Gls)
2016–2017	Al-Hilal	5	(0)
2017–2020	Al-Shabab	34	(0)
2020–2023	Al-Ettifaq	29	(0)
2025–2026	Al-Sharq	29	(0)

International career
2016–2017	Saudi Arabia U23		
- * Club domestic league appearances and goals as of 17:54, 5 June 2016 (UTC)

Fahad Ghazi Saeed Zahem (Arabic: فهد غازي زاحم, born 1 March 1994) is a Saudi footballer who plays as a left-back.

== Career ==
On 31 January 2020, Ghazi joined Al-Ettifaq on a three-year deal.

On 29 September 2025, Ghazi joined Al-Sharq after two years without a club.
