= Mohammed Al-Haiti =

Saudi Arabian footballer

Personal information
- Full name: Mohammed Ahmed Abdulrahman Al-Haiti
- Date of birth: February 10, 1996 (age 30)
- Place of birth: Dammam, Saudi Arabia
- Height: 1.86 m (6 ft 1 in)
- Position: Goalkeeper

Youth career
- Al-Ettifaq

Senior career*
Years	Team	Apps	(Gls)
2017–2023	Al-Ettifaq	16	(0)
2018	→ Al-Hazem (loan)	0	(0)
- * Club domestic league appearances and goals as of 27 June 2022

Mohammed Al-Haiti (Arabic: محمد الحايطي; born February 10, 1996) is a Saudi Arabian professional footballer who plays as a goalkeeper.

== Career ==
Al-Haiti began his career at the youth team of Al-Ettifaq. On 31 January 2018, Al-Haiti joined First Division side Al-Hazem on loan for the 2017–18 season. On 18 April 2019, Al-Haiti made his debut for Al-Ettifaq in the league match against Al-Ittihad. On 8 September 2019, Al-Haiti renewed his contract with Al-Ettifaq for another five years.
