= Hamed Al-Ghamdi =

Saudi Arabian footballer

Personal information
- Full name: Hamed Abdullah Al-Ghamdi
- Date of birth: April 2, 1999 (age 27)
- Place of birth: Dammam, Saudi Arabia
- Height: 1.63 m (5 ft 4 in)
- Position: Midfielder

Team information
- Current team: Al-Ittihad
- Number: 80

Youth career
- Al-Ettifaq

Senior career*
Years	Team	Apps	(Gls)
2017–2025	Al-Ettifaq	106	(9)
2024–2025	→ Al-Ittihad (loan)	17	(1)
2025–	Al-Ittihad	8	(0)

International career^{‡}
2017–2019	Saudi Arabia U20	16	(4)
2019–2022	Saudi Arabia U23	24	(2)
2021–	Saudi Arabia	3	(0)
- * Club domestic league appearances and goals as of 24 February 2026 ‡ National team caps and goals as of 18:30, 7 December 2021 (UTC)

Hamed Abdullah Al-Ghamdi (Arabic: حامد عبد الله الغامدى; born April 2, 1999) is a Saudi Arabian professional footballer who plays as a midfielder for Saudi Pro League side Al-Ittihad and the Saudi Arabia national team.

== Career ==
On 30 January 2024, Al-Ghamdi joined Al-Ittihad on a six-month loan. On 7 June 2024, Al-Ghamdi rejoined Al-Ittihad on a one-year loan. On 18 July 2025, Al-Ghamdi joined Al-Ittihad on a five-year deal.

== Honours ==
Al-Ittihad

- Saudi Pro League: 2024–25
- King's Cup: 2024–25

Saudi Arabia U20

- AFC U-19 Championship: 2018

Saudi Arabia U23

- AFC U-23 Asian Cup: 2022
