= Ibrahim Mahnashi =

Saudi Arabian footballer

Personal information
- Full name: Ibrahim Hussain Mahnashi
- Date of birth: November 18, 1999 (age 26)
- Place of birth: Dammam, Saudi Arabia
- Height: 1.71 m (5 ft 7 in)
- Position: Midfielder

Team information
- Current team: Al-Qadsiah
- Number: 40

Youth career
- –2018: Al-Ettifaq

Senior career*
Years	Team	Apps	(Gls)
2018–2023	Al-Ettifaq	107	(3)
2023–	Al-Qadsiah	49	(4)

International career^{‡}
2017–2019	Saudi Arabia U20	18	(1)
2020–2022	Saudi Arabia U23	16	(0)
2021–	Saudi Arabia	1	(0)
- * Club domestic league appearances and goals as of 13 March 2026 ‡ National team caps and goals as of 7 December 2021

Ibrahim Hussain Mahnashi (Arabic: إبراهيم حسين محنشى; born 18 November 1999) is a Saudi professional footballer who plays as a midfielder for Al-Qadsiah and the Saudi Arabia national team.

== Career ==
On 3 August 2023, Mahnashi joined Al-Qadsiah on a four-year deal.

== Honours ==
Al-Qadsiah

- First Division League: 2023–24

Saudi Arabia U20

- AFC U-19 Championship: 2018

Saudi Arabia U23

- AFC U-23 Asian Cup: 2022
