= 2024–25 Al-Ettifaq FC season =

Al-Ettifaq
2024–25 season
- President: Samer Al-Misehal
- Manager: Steven Gerrard (until 30 January); Saad Al-Shehri (from 30 January)
- Stadium: Al-Ettifaq Club Stadium
- Pro League: 7th
- King Cup: Round of 16 (knocked out by Al-Jabalain)
- Gulf Club Champions League: Semi-finals (knocked out by Duhok)
- Top goalscorer: League: Georginio Wijnaldum (14); All: Georginio Wijnaldum (15)
- Highest home attendance: 11,008 v Al-Ittihad; 30 November 2024; Saudi Pro League
- Lowest home attendance: 1,449 v Al-Adalah; 23 September 2024; King's Cup
- Average home league attendance: 5,761
Home colours	Away colours	Third colours
- All statistics correct as of 26 May 2025.

The 2024–25 season was Al-Ettifaq's 46th non-consecutive season in the Pro League and their 79th season in existence. In addition to the Pro League, the club participated in the King Cup and the Gulf Club Champions League.

The season covers the period from 1 July 2024 to 30 June 2025.

== Players ==
=== First-team squad ===
As of 1 February 2025

Note: Flags indicate national team as defined under FIFA eligibility rules; some limited exceptions apply. Players may hold more than one non-FIFA nationality.

No.	Pos.	Nation	Player
1	GK	SVK	Marek Rodák
3	DF	KSA	Abdullah Madu
4	DF	SCO	Jack Hendry
6	MF	KSA	Mukhtar Ali
7	FW	CMR	Karl Toko Ekambi
8	MF	NED	Georginio Wijnaldum (captain)
9	FW	FRA	Moussa Dembélé
10	MF	ESP	Álvaro Medrán
11	FW	JAM	Demarai Gray
12	DF	KSA	Turki Al-Madani ^{U19}
14	MF	BRA	Vitinho
15	DF	KSA	Abdullah Al-Bishi ^{U19}
18	FW	POR	João Costa
21	FW	KSA	Abdullah Radif (on loan from Al-Hilal)
24	DF	KSA	Ahmed Bamsaud (on loan from Al-Ittihad)
25	DF	KSA	Abdulbasit Hindi

No.	Pos.	Nation	Player
27	MF	KSA	Mohammed Al-Qadhi ^{U19}
28	DF	KSA	Abdulrahman Sahhari ^{U19}
29	DF	KSA	Mohammed Abdulrahman
31	DF	TUN	Wissam Chaouali ^{U19}
33	DF	KSA	Madallah Al-Olayan
36	MF	COL	Josen Escobar (on loan from América de Cali)
38	MF	KSA	Abdullah Al-Zahrani ^{U19}
46	MF	KSA	Abdulaziz Al-Aliwa (on loan from Al-Nassr)
61	DF	KSA	Radhi Al-Otaibi
70	DF	KSA	Abdullah Al-Khateeb
77	MF	KSA	Majed Dawran
87	DF	KSA	Meshal Al-Sebyani
88	MF	KSA	Abdulellah Al-Malki (on loan from Al-Hilal)
92	GK	KSA	Turki Baljoush
96	GK	KSA	Marwan Al-Haidari (on loan from Al-Khaleej)
99	FW	KSA	Mohammed Al-Eisa ^{U19}

=== Out on loan ===
Note: Flags indicate national team as defined under FIFA eligibility rules; some limited exceptions apply. Players may hold more than one non-FIFA nationality.

No.	Pos.	Nation	Player
6	MF	TUR	Berat Özdemir (on loan to İstanbul Başakşehir)
13	DF	KSA	Hamdan Al-Shamrani (on loan to Al-Kholood)
17	MF	KSA	Hassan Al-Musallam ^{U19} (on loan to Al-Khaleej)
19	MF	KSA	Khalid Al-Ghannam (on loan to Al-Hilal)
20	FW	KSA	Thamer Al-Khaibari ^{U19} (on loan to Al-Raed)
22	GK	KSA	Bilal Al-Dawaa (on loan to Al-Jandal)
23	GK	KSA	Ahmed Al-Rehaili (on loan to Al-Nassr)

No.	Pos.	Nation	Player
27	FW	KSA	Redha Al-Abdullah ^{U19} (on loan to Al-Fayha)
32	DF	COD	Marcel Tisserand (on loan to Al-Khaleej)
35	DF	KSA	Abdullah Khalifah (on loan to Al-Safa)
51	DF	KSA	Meshal Al-Alaeli (on loan to Al-Wehda)
80	MF	KSA	Hamed Al-Ghamdi (on loan to Al-Ittihad)
90	MF	KSA	Mohammed Mahzari (on loan to Al-Taawoun)
—	GK	KSA	Abdullah Al-Owaishir (on loan to Al-Wehda)

== Transfers and loans ==
=== Transfers in ===
Entry date	Position	No.	Player	From club	Fee	Ref.
30 June 2024	GK	92	(Saudi Arabia) Turki Baljoush	(Saudi Arabia) Al-Nairyah	End of loan	
30 June 2024	DF	5	(Saudi Arabia) Saad Al Mousa	(Saudi Arabia) Al-Ittihad	End of loan	
30 June 2024	DF	32	(Democratic Republic of the Congo) Marcel Tisserand	(Saudi Arabia) Abha	End of loan	
30 June 2024	MF	6	(Turkey) Berat Özdemir	(Turkey) Trabzonspor	End of loan	
30 June 2024	MF	7	(Saudi Arabia) Mohammed Al-Kuwaykibi	(Saudi Arabia) Al-Taawoun	End of loan	
30 June 2024	MF	8	(Saudi Arabia) Hamed Al-Ghamdi	(Saudi Arabia) Al-Ittihad	End of loan	
30 June 2024	MF	15	(Saudi Arabia) Ahmed Al-Ghamdi	(Saudi Arabia) Al-Ittihad	End of loan	
30 June 2024	MF	24	(Saudi Arabia) Nawaf Hazazi	(Saudi Arabia) Al-Bukiryah	End of loan	
30 June 2024	MF	42	(Saudi Arabia) Salem Al-Maqadi	(Saudi Arabia) Jeddah	End of loan	
30 June 2024	FW	23	(Saudi Arabia) Jaber Qarradi	(Saudi Arabia) Ohod	End of loan	
30 June 2024	FW	14	(Brazil) Vitinho	(Saudi Arabia) Al-Shabab	End of loan	
7 July 2024	DF	33	(Saudi Arabia) Madallah Al-Olayan	(Saudi Arabia) Al-Ittihad	Free	
25 July 2024	GK	1	(Slovakia) Marek Rodák	(England) Fulham	Free	
30 July 2024	DF	3	(Saudi Arabia) Abdullah Madu	(Saudi Arabia) Al-Nassr	Undisclosed	
6 August 2024	GK	23	(Saudi Arabia) Ahmed Al-Rehaili	(Saudi Arabia) Al-Raed	Undisclosed	
6 August 2024	DF	87	(Saudi Arabia) Meshal Al-Sebyani	(Saudi Arabia) Al-Faisaly	Free	
2 September 2024	FW	18	(Portugal) João Costa	(Italy) Roma	$10,000,000	
3 September 2024	DF	25	(Saudi Arabia) Abdulbasit Hindi	(Saudi Arabia) Al-Ahli	$1,865,000	
29 January 2025	MF	6	(Saudi Arabia) Mukhtar Ali	(Saudi Arabia) Al-Nassr	Swap	

=== Loans in ===
Start date	End date	Position	No.	Player	From club	Fee	Ref.
9 July 2024	End of season	MF	88	(Saudi Arabia) Abdulellah Al-Malki	(Saudi Arabia) Al-Hilal	None	
6 August 2024	End of season	MF	46	(Saudi Arabia) Abdulaziz Al-Aliwa	(Saudi Arabia) Al-Nassr	None	
17 August 2024	1 January 2025	MF	75	(Ivory Coast) Seko Fofana	(Saudi Arabia) Al-Nassr	None	
2 September 2024	End of season	FW	21	(Saudi Arabia) Abdullah Radif	(Saudi Arabia) Al-Hilal	None	
12 January 2025	End of season	DF	24	(Saudi Arabia) Ahmed Bamsaud	(Saudi Arabia) Al-Ittihad	None	
16 January 2025	End of season	MF	36	(Colombia) Josen Escobar	(Colombia) América de Cali	$200,000	
31 January 2025	End of season	GK	96	(Saudi Arabia) Marwan Al-Haidari	(Saudi Arabia) Al-Khaleej	None	

=== Transfers out ===
Exit date	Position	No.	Player	To club	Fee	Ref.
30 June 2024	GK	21	(Saudi Arabia) Amin Bukhari	(Saudi Arabia) Al-Nassr	End of loan	
30 June 2024	DF	76	(Saudi Arabia) Abdullah Madu	(Saudi Arabia) Al-Nassr	End of loan	
30 June 2024	MF	24	(Saudi Arabia) Abdulrahman Al-Aboud	(Saudi Arabia) Al-Ittihad	End of loan	
30 June 2024	MF	75	(Ivory Coast) Seko Fofana	(Saudi Arabia) Al-Nassr	End of loan	
30 June 2024	FW	90	(Saudi Arabia) Haroune Camara	(Saudi Arabia) Al-Ittihad	End of loan	
1 July 2024	DF	5	(Saudi Arabia) Saad Al Mousa	(Saudi Arabia) Al-Ittihad	$5,320,000	
1 July 2024	MF	7	(Saudi Arabia) Mohammed Al-Kuwaykibi	(Saudi Arabia) Al-Taawoun	Free	
1 July 2024	MF	15	(Saudi Arabia) Ahmed Al-Ghamdi	(Saudi Arabia) Al-Ittihad	$8,000,000	
14 July 2024	MF	11	(Saudi Arabia) Ali Hazazi	(Saudi Arabia) Al-Qadsiah	$6,000,000	
22 July 2024	FW	23	(Saudi Arabia) Jaber Qarradi	(Saudi Arabia) Al-Diriyah	$400,000	
1 August 2024	DF	3	(Saudi Arabia) Mohammed Al-Dossari	(Saudi Arabia) Neom	Undisclosed	
1 August 2024	FW	30	(Saudi Arabia) Muhannad Al Saad	(Saudi Arabia) Neom	$4,000,000	
6 August 2024	MF	–	(Saudi Arabia) Saleh Al-Zanan	(Saudi Arabia) Al-Noor	Free	
24 August 2024	FW	–	(Saudi Arabia) Abdullah Al Ajian	(Saudi Arabia) Al-Bukiryah	Free	
1 September 2024	MF	24	(Saudi Arabia) Nawaf Hazazi	(Saudi Arabia) Al-Sahel	Free	
12 September 2024	DF	–	(Saudi Arabia) Maitham Al-Eisa	(Saudi Arabia) Hajer	Free	
13 September 2024	GK	48	(Brazil) Paulo Victor	(Qatar) Al-Rayyan	Free	
25 September 2024	MF	26	(Saudi Arabia) Abdulmohsen Al-Dossari	(Saudi Arabia) Mudhar	Free	
29 January 2025	MF	16	(Saudi Arabia) Bassam Hazazi	(Saudi Arabia) Al-Nassr	Swap	

=== Loans out ===
Start date	End date	Position	No.	Player	To club	Fee	Ref.
1 July 2024	End of season	MF	8	(Saudi Arabia) Hamed Al-Ghamdi	(Saudi Arabia) Al-Ittihad	None	
13 July 2024	End of season	DF	13	(Saudi Arabia) Hamdan Al-Shamrani	(Saudi Arabia) Al-Kholood	None	
9 August 2024	End of season	MF	6	(Turkey) Berat Özdemir	(Turkey) İstanbul Başakşehir	None	
18 August 2024	End of season	DF	32	(Democratic Republic of the Congo) Marcel Tisserand	(Saudi Arabia) Al-Khaleej	None	
19 August 2024	End of season	FW	–	(Saudi Arabia) Redha Al-Abdullah	(Saudi Arabia) Al-Fayha	None	
2 September 2024	End of season	MF	19	(Saudi Arabia) Khalid Al-Ghannam	(Saudi Arabia) Al-Hilal	None	
3 September 2024	End of season	GK	1	(Saudi Arabia) Abdullah Al-Owaishir	(Saudi Arabia) Al-Wehda	None	
3 September 2024	End of season	DF	17	(Saudi Arabia) Meshal Al-Alaeli	(Saudi Arabia) Al-Wehda	None	
4 September 2024	End of season	FW	20	(Saudi Arabia) Thamer Al-Khaibari	(Saudi Arabia) Al-Raed	None	
7 September 2024	End of season	GK	22	(Saudi Arabia) Bilal Al-Dawaa	(Saudi Arabia) Al-Jandal	None	
31 January 2025	End of season	GK	23	(Saudi Arabia) Ahmed Al-Rehaili	(Saudi Arabia) Al-Nassr	None	
31 January 2025	End of season	MF	17	(Saudi Arabia) Hassan Al-Musallam	(Saudi Arabia) Al-Khaleej	None	

== Pre-season and friendlies ==
20 July 2024 Friendly	Al-Ettifaq (Saudi Arabia)	2–0	(Spain) Intercity	Cartagena, Spain
18:00 CEST	Al-Olayan 13'; Al-Khaibari 89'	Report		Stadium: La Manga Club Football Stadium

24 July 2024 Friendly	Al-Ettifaq (Saudi Arabia)	2–2	(England) Tottenham U21	San Pedro del Pinatar, Spain
16:30 CEST	Vitinho 10'; Toko Ekambi 38'	Report	Akhamrich 53'; Baptise 75'	Stadium: Pinatar Arena

27 July 2024 Friendly	Al-Ettifaq (Saudi Arabia)	0–2	(Spain) Cartagena	Cartagena, Spain
19:00 CEST		Report	Carlos 31'; Muñoz 82'	Stadium: La Manga Club Football Stadium

31 July 2024 Friendly	Al-Ettifaq (Saudi Arabia)	2–3	(Spain) Real Oviedo	San Pedro del Pinatar, Spain
10:00 CEST	Dembélé 27'; Gray 53'	Report	Paraschiv 8'; Miguélez 83'; Alemão 85'	Stadium: Pinatar Arena

4 August 2024 Friendly	Al-Ettifaq (Saudi Arabia)	2–0	(Spain) Almería B	Cartagena, Spain
20:00 CEST	Dembélé 57'; Toko Ekambi 82'	Report		Stadium: La Manga Club Football Stadium

13 August 2024 Friendly	Al-Ettifaq (Saudi Arabia)	3–3	(Saudi Arabia) Neom	Dammam, Saudi Arabia
20:30 AST	Toko Ekambi 18', 24'; Wijnaldum 89'	Report	Sharahili 61'; Semedo 64'; Al-Zaid 66'	Stadium: Al-Ettifaq Club Stadium

17 August 2024 Friendly	Al-Ettifaq (Saudi Arabia)	2–0	(Egypt) Ismaily	Dammam, Saudi Arabia
18:45 AST	Dembélé 22'; Madu 52'	Report		Stadium: Al-Ettifaq Club Stadium

== Competitions ==
=== Overview ===
Competition	Record							
Competition	Pld	W	D	L	GF	GA	GD	Win %
Pro League	34	14	8	12	44	45	−1	41.18
King Cup	2	1	0	1	3	3	+0	50.00
Gulf Club Champions League	8	4	1	3	13	7	+6	50.00
Total	44	19	9	16	60	55	+5	43.18

Updated to match played 26 May 2025
Source: Competitions

=== Pro League ===
==== League table ====
Pos	Team	Pld	W	D	L	GF	GA	GD	Pts	Qualification or relegation
5	Al-Ahli	34	21	4	9	69	36	+33	67	Qualification for AFC Champions League Elite League stage (Note: By virtue of winning 2024–25 AFC Champions League Elite.)
6	Al-Shabab	34	18	6	10	65	41	+24	60	Qualification for the AGCFF Gulf Club Champions League group stage (Note: Al-Qadsiah withdrew from AGCFF Gulf Club Champions League, the spot was passed to the next highest-placed team who did not qualified to the Asian club competitions.)
7	Al-Ettifaq	34	14	8	12	44	45	−1	50	
8	Al-Taawoun	34	12	9	13	40	39	+1	45	
9	Al-Kholood	34	12	4	18	42	64	−22	40	

Source: SPL
Rules for classification: 1) Points; 2) Head-to-head points; 3) Head-to-head goal difference; 4) Total goal difference; 5) Total goals scored; 6) Fair-play points
(Note: Head-to-head record is used only after all the matches between the teams in question have been played).

==== Results summary ====
Overall								Home						Away					
Pld	W	D	L	GF	GA	GD	Pts	W	D	L	GF	GA	GD	W	D	L	GF	GA	GD
34	14	8	12	44	45	−1	50	6	2	9	17	26	−9	8	6	3	27	19	+8

Last updated: 26 May 2025.
Source: Saudi Pro League

==== Results by round ====
Round	1	2	3	4	5	6	7	8	9	10	11	12	13	14	15	16	17	18	19	20	21	22	23	24	25	26	27	28	29	30	31	32	33	34
Ground	A	H	A	H	A	H	H	A	H	A	A	H	A	H	A	H	A	H	A	H	A	H	A	A	H	A	H	H	A	H	A	H	A	H
Result	W	W	W	L	D	L	L	D	L	L	D	L	W	L	W	L	D	W	W	L	W	W	D	W	L	D	D	W	L	W	L	D	W	W
Position	4	4	3	4	6	8	9	10	11	12	12	13	11	11	11	11	12	11	9	10	9	7	7	7	7	8	8	7	8	7	7	7	7	7

Updated to match(es) played on 26 May 2025. Source: Saudi Pro League
A = Away; H = Home; W = Win; D = Draw; L = Loss

==== Matches ====
All times are local, AST (UTC+3).

Win Draw Loss Postponed

24 August 2024 1	Al-Shabab	0–1	Al-Ettifaq	Riyadh
21:00		Report	Vitinho (yellow card) 58'; Dembélé 74'; Rodák (yellow card) 90'	Stadium: Al-Shabab Club Stadium; Attendance: 3,880; Referee: Majed Al-Shamrani

28 August 2024 2	Al-Ettifaq	1–0	Al-Okhdood	Dammam
21:00	Dembélé 63'	Report	Asiri (yellow card) 18'	Stadium: Al-Ettifaq Club Stadium; Attendance: 3,276; Referee: Khalid Al-Teris

14 September 2024 3	Al-Fateh	1–2	Al-Ettifaq	Al-Hasa
18:30	Djaniny 64'	Report	Radif 42'; Costa 73'; Al-Olayan (yellow card) 80'	Stadium: Al-Fateh Club Stadium; Attendance: 9,826; Referee: Abdulsamad Bakri

20 September 2024 4	Al-Ettifaq	0–3	Al-Nassr	Dammam
21:00	Fofana (yellow card) 49'; Dembélé (yellow card) 88'	Report	Ronaldo 33' (pen.); Al-Najdi 56'; Talisca 70'; Ali (yellow card) 87'	Stadium: Al-Ettifaq Club Stadium; Attendance: 9,390; Referee: Serdar Gözübüyük (Netherlands)

29 September 2024 5	Al-Taawoun	1–1	Al-Ettifaq	Buraidah
21:00	Pedro 13'; Al-Jumayah (yellow card) 19'; Flávio (yellow card) 41' (yellow-red card) 49'	Report	Al-Otaibi (yellow card) 60'; Radif (yellow card) 80'; Dembélé 90+3'; Toko Ekambi (yellow card) 90+6'	Stadium: Al-Taawoun Club Stadium; Attendance: 2,483; Referee: Faisal Al-Blwi

3 October 2024 6	Al-Ettifaq	0–1	Al-Raed	Dammam
18:00	Hindi (yellow card) 45+6'	Report	Al-Amri 36'; N. Hazazi (yellow card) 47'; Al-Dossari (yellow card) 88'	Stadium: Al-Ettifaq Club Stadium; Attendance: 3,351; Referee: Raed Al-Zahrani

20 October 2024 7	Al-Ettifaq	2–3	Al-Orobah	Dammam
21:00	Costa 44', (yellow card) 45+4'; Radif (red card) 45+9'; Wijnaldum 45+11'; Rodák (yellow card) 64'	Report	Al-Shuwaish (yellow card) 9'; Tello 12', 84'; Guðmundsson (yellow card) 47', (goal) 74'; Al-Saiari (yellow card) 66'; Kandouss (yellow card) 71'	Stadium: Al-Ettifaq Club Stadium; Attendance: 2,532; Referee: Mohammed Al-Harbi

26 October 2024 8	Al-Fayha	1–1	Al-Ettifaq	Al Majma'ah
18:00	López 28'; Al-Harajin (yellow card) 69'	Report	Al-Olayan (yellow card) 24'; Al-Malki (yellow card) 48'; Medrán 53'; Madu (yellow card) 90+1'	Stadium: Al Majma'ah Sports City; Attendance: 952; Referee: Mohammed Abu Shaqarah

2 November 2024 9	Al-Ettifaq	0–2	Al-Qadsiah	Dammam
21:00	Al-Sebyani (yellow card) 14'; Al-Malki (yellow card) 85'; Madu (yellow card) 90+6'	Report	Álvarez 12', (yellow card) 75'; Quiñones 45+3', (yellow card) 79'; Nacho (yellow card) 90+6'	Stadium: EGO Stadium; Attendance: 9,124; Referee: Anastasios Sidiropoulos (Greece)

8 November 2024 10	Al-Hilal	3–1	Al-Ettifaq	Riyadh
17:45	Cancelo (yellow card) 24'; Mitrović 45+2'; N. Al-Dawsari (yellow card) 50'; Malcom 81'; Al-Qahtani 90+6'	Report	Al-Olayan (yellow card) 22'; Al-Malki (yellow card) 45+3'; Al-Sebyani (yellow card) 74'; Vitinho 90+4' (pen.); Radif (red card) 90+8'	Stadium: Kingdom Arena; Attendance: 17,296; Referee: Urs Schnyder (Switzerland)

24 November 2024 11	Al-Riyadh	0–0	Al-Ettifaq	Riyadh
17:40	Kal (yellow card) 38'	Report	Medrán (yellow card) 56'	Stadium: Prince Faisal bin Fahad Sports City; Attendance: 448; Referee: Ahmed Al-Rumaikhani

30 November 2024 12	Al-Ettifaq	0–4	Al-Ittihad	Dammam
17:25	Al-Malki (yellow card) 3'; Al-Olayan (yellow card) 43'; Al-Khateeb (yellow card) 54'	Report	Mitaj (yellow card) 17'; Kanté 35'; Benzema 53'; Aouar 66'; Bergwijn 70'; Fabinho (yellow card) 78'	Stadium: EGO Stadium; Attendance: 11,008; Referee: Sami Al-Jires

7 December 2024 13	Al-Khaleej	1–2	Al-Ettifaq	Dammam
15:55	Narey 35'; Kourbelis (yellow card) 39'; Al Hamsal (yellow card) 66'	Report	Wijnaldum 45+6'; Toko Ekambi (yellow card) 61'; Radif 83'; Abdulrahman (yellow card) 90+4'	Stadium: Prince Mohamed bin Fahd Stadium; Attendance: 4,231; Referee: Khaled Al-Teris

10 January 2025 14	Al-Ettifaq	2–3	Al-Kholood	Dammam
17:40	Wijnaldum 30'; Al-Olayan (yellow card) 44'; Gray (yellow card) 66'; Dembélé 90+6' (pen.)	Report	Muleka 26' (pen.); Hawsawi (yellow card) 32'; Maolida 54', 90+10'; Gyömbér (yellow card) 90+4'	Stadium: EGO Stadium; Attendance: 2,678; Referee: Abdullah Al-Shehri

15 January 2025 15	Damac	0–3	Al-Ettifaq	Khamis Mushait
18:30	Bedrane (yellow card) 44'; Stanciu (yellow card) 69'; Solan (yellow card) 73'	Report	Dembélé 22', 45' (pen.); Abdulrahman (yellow card) 64'; Vitinho 83'; Al-Olayan (yellow card) 88'; Costa (yellow card) 90+5'	Stadium: Damac Club Stadium; Attendance: 2,813; Referee: Sultan Al-Harbi

20 January 2025 16	Al-Ettifaq	1–2	Al-Ahli	Dammam
20:00	Dembélé (yellow card) 23'; Radif (yellow card) 45+1'; Abdulrahman (yellow card) 76'; Wijnaldum 90+1'; Costa (yellow card) 90+3'	Report	Veiga 30'; Mahrez (yellow card) 42'; Firmino 63'; Al-Rashidi (yellow card) 90+6'	Stadium: EGO Stadium; Attendance: 6,403; Referee: Georgi Kabakov (Bulgaria)

25 January 2025 17	Al-Wehda	2–2	Al-Ettifaq	Mecca
20:00	Al Makahasi (yellow card) 5'; Al-Salem 31'; Amyn (yellow card) 67', (goal) 85'; Makki (yellow card) 87'	Report	Dembélé 79'; Madu 90+3'	Stadium: King Abdulaziz Sports City; Attendance: 700; Referee: Khaled Al-Ahmari

31 January 2025 18	Al-Ettifaq	3–1	Al-Shabab	Dammam
20:00	Al-Malki (yellow card) 33'; Wijnaldum 35', 90+11'; Costa 43'; Ali (yellow card) 68'	Report	Hamdallah 40'	Stadium: EGO Stadium; Attendance: 9,132; Referee: Sami Al-Jires

8 February 2025 19	Al-Okhdood	0–2	Al-Ettifaq	Najran
18:40	Khamis (yellow card) 51'; Petros (yellow card) 52'; Al-Zabdani (red card) 90+3'	Report	Wijnaldum 7'; Toko Ekambi (yellow card) 45+3', (goal) 73'; Al-Khateeb (yellow card) 64'	Stadium: Prince Hathloul bin Abdulaziz Sports City; Attendance: 980; Referee: Abdulsamad Bakri

14 February 2025 20	Al-Ettifaq	1–2	Al-Fateh	Dammam
18:05	Vitinho 45+5'; Medrán (yellow card) 65'; Al-Otaibi (yellow card) 80'	Report	Batna 31' (pen.); Al-Aqidi (yellow card) 45'; Bendebka 45+9'; Djaniny (yellow card) 54'	Stadium: EGO Stadium; Attendance: 5,311; Referee: Abdullah Al-Kharbosh

21 February 2025 21	Al-Nassr	2–3	Al-Ettifaq	Riyadh
20:00	Yahya 47'; Brozović (yellow card) 54'; Al-Fatil 65'; Durán (red card) 90'	Report	Wijnaldum 55', 89'; Al-Otaibi (yellow card) 61'; Al-Fatil 82' (o.g.); Al-Malki (yellow card) 90+1'; Bamsaud (yellow card) 90+7'	Stadium: Al-Awwal Park; Attendance: 24,626; Referee: Kirill Levnikov (Russia)

26 February 2025 22	Al-Ettifaq	1–0	Al-Taawoun	Dammam
18:15	Wijnaldum 78'; Toko Ekambi (yellow card) 87'	Report	Al-Mufarrij (yellow card) 6'; Al-Ahmed (yellow card) 90+7'	Stadium: EGO Stadium; Attendance: 4,868; Referee: Sultan Al-Harbi

2 March 2025 23	Al-Raed	1–1	Al-Ettifaq	Buraidah
22:00	Normann (yellow card) 45+1', (goal) 64'; Hawsawi (yellow card) 52'; Bouzok (yellow card) 75'	Report	Abdulrahman (yellow card) 45+3'; Al-Olayan (yellow card) 65'; Madu (yellow card) 72'; Al-Malki (yellow card) 90+4'; Al-Khateeb 90+9'	Stadium: Al-Raed Club Stadium; Attendance: 1,141; Referee: Fareeh Al-Jaloud

8 March 2025 24	Al-Orobah	1–2	Al-Ettifaq	Sakakah
22:00	Al Somah 70' (pen.); Muhar (yellow card) 78'; Al-Qarni (yellow card) 82'	Report	Al-Khateeb (yellow card) 16'; Al-Maqati 39' (o.g.); Al-Malki (yellow card) 74'; Medrán 79'	Stadium: Al Jouf University Stadium; Attendance: 1,144; Referee: Ahmed Al-Rumaikhani

15 March 2025 25	Al-Ettifaq	0–2	Al-Fayha	Dammam
22:00	Al-Khateeb (yellow card) 14'; Escobar (yellow card) 46'; Costa (yellow card) 65'	Report	Shukurov (yellow card) 26'; Smalling 45+1'; Abdi (yellow card) 53'; Cimirot (yellow card) 61'; Costa 63' (o.g.)	Stadium: EGO Stadium; Attendance: 4,121; Referee: Abdulsamad Bakri

5 April 2025 26	Al-Qadsiah	1–1	Al-Ettifaq	Dammam
17:05	Aboulshamat 45'; Nández (yellow card) 45+2'; Hazazi (yellow card) 90'	Report	Medrán (yellow card) 27'; Hendry (yellow card) 45+6'; Hindi (yellow card) 55'; Wijnaldum 63'; Ali (yellow card) 90+3'	Stadium: Prince Mohamed bin Fahd Stadium; Attendance: 11,231; Referee: Mario Escobar (Guatemala)

11 April 2025 27	Al-Ettifaq	1–1	Al-Hilal	Dammam
21:00	Costa (yellow card) 43', (goal) 45+6'; Al-Malki (yellow card) 46'; Vitinho (yellow card) 82'	Report	Lodi (yellow card) 45+5'; Malcom 57'; Koulibaly (yellow card) 62'	Stadium: EGO Stadium; Attendance: 10,237; Referee: Nikola Dabanović (Montenegro)

17 April 2025 28	Al-Ettifaq	1–0	Al-Riyadh	Dammam
18:40	Costa (yellow card) 29'; Hendry (yellow card) 43'; Vitinho 59' (pen.), (yellow card) 71'	Report	Tozé (yellow card) 39'; Tambakti (yellow card) 76'	Stadium: EGO Stadium; Attendance: 3,560; Referee: Khalid Al-Ahmari

21 April 2025 29	Al-Ittihad	3–2	Al-Ettifaq	Jeddah
21:00	Pereira 11'; Al Mousa (yellow card) 30'; Benzema 35'; Aouar 45+2'; Fabinho (yellow card) 58'; Al-Sqoor (yellow card) 88'	Report	Vitinho 5'; Pereira 83' (o.g.); Al-Aliwa (yellow card) 90+3'	Stadium: Prince Abdullah Al-Faisal Sports City; Attendance: 17,743; Referee: Georgi Kabakov (Bulgaria)

2 May 2025 30	Al-Ettifaq	2–1	Al-Khaleej	Dammam
18:50	Wijnaldum 15' (pen.), 54'; Medrán (yellow card) 38'; Al-Otaibi (yellow card) 90+7'	Report	Hawsawi (yellow card) 36'; Hamzi 38'; Rebocho (yellow card) 44'	Stadium: EGO Stadium; Attendance: 6,857; Referee: Abdullah Al-Shehri

10 May 2025 31	Al-Kholood	1–0	Al-Ettifaq	Ar Rass
19:20	Maolida 68'; H. Al-Shamrani (yellow card) 90+7'	Report	Al-Olayan (yellow card) 17'; Al-Khateeb (yellow card) 42'; Ali (yellow card) 90+2'; Hendry (red card) 90+6'; Abdulrahman (yellow card) 90+9'	Stadium: Al-Hazem Club Stadium; Attendance: 3,303; Referee: Faisal Al-Blwi

17 May 2025 32	Al-Ettifaq	0–0	Damac	Dammam
18:55		Report	Al-Sibyani (yellow card) 85'	Stadium: EGO Stadium; Attendance: 2,349; Referee: Abdullah Al-Kharbosh

22 May 2025 33	Al-Ahli	1–3	Al-Ettifaq	Jeddah
21:00	Toney 6' (pen.); Ibañez (yellow card) 53'	Report	Al-Khateeb (yellow card) 4'; Abdulrahman 49'; Wijnaldum 87' (pen.); Al-Olayan 90+5'	Stadium: Prince Abdullah Al-Faisal Sports City; Attendance: 8,412; Referee: Nikola Dabanović (Montenegro)

26 May 2025 34	Al-Ettifaq	2–1	Al-Wehda	Dammam
21:00	Radif 45'; Vitinho 90+6'	Report	El Yamiq (yellow card) 31', (goal) 70'	Stadium: EGO Stadium; Attendance: 3,733; Referee: Sami Al-Jires

=== King Cup ===
All times are local, AST (UTC+3).

23 September 2024 Round of 32	Al-Ettifaq	2–0	Al-Adalah	Dammam
21:00	Al-Sebyani (yellow card) 37'; Medrán (yellow card) 45+3'; Toko Ekambi 78', 90+4'	Report	Abu Abd (yellow card) 43'; Bensayah (yellow card) 66'	Stadium: Al-Ettifaq Club Stadium; Attendance: 1,449; Referee: Abdullah Al-Harbi

30 October 2024 Round of 16	Al-Jabalain	3–1	Al-Ettifaq	Haʼil
18:05	Lacroix 9'; Mendes 57'; Bukhari (yellow card) 67'; Al-Selouli 73'; Bakheet (yellow card) 90'	Report	Vitinho 41' (pen.)	Stadium: Prince Abdulaziz bin Musa'ed Sports City; Referee: Abdullah Al-Shehri

=== Gulf Club Champions League ===
==== Group stage ====
Pos	Team	Pld	W	D	L	GF	GA	GD	Pts	Qualification	ETT	QAD	RIF	ARB
1	(Saudi Arabia) Al-Ettifaq	6	4	1	1	13	5	+8	13	Knockout stage	—	1–1	3–1	5–0
2	(Kuwait) Al-Qadsia	6	2	3	1	8	5	+3	9	Knockout stage	0–1	—	1–0	3–0
3	(Bahrain) Al-Riffa	6	2	2	2	8	8	0	8		2–1	2–2	—	2–0
4	(Qatar) Al-Arabi	6	0	2	4	3	14	−11	2		1–2	1–1	1–1	—

Source: GSA
Rules for classification: Group stage tiebreakers

23 October 2024 1	Al-Ettifaq (Saudi Arabia)	3–1	(Bahrain) Al-Riffa	Dammam, Saudi Arabia
20:15 UTC+3	Toko Ekambi 44', 49'; Hendry (yellow card) 63'; Hindi (yellow card) 90+1'; Wijnaldum 90+2'; Dembélé (yellow card) 90+10'; Al-Otaibi (yellow card) 90+13'	Report	Vargas 42'; Madan (yellow card) 88'	Stadium: Al-Ettifaq Club Stadium; Attendance: 2,618; Referee: Omar Al-Yaqoubi (Oman)

5 November 2024 2	Al-Qadsia (Kuwait)	0–1	(Saudi Arabia) Al-Ettifaq	Hawally, Kuwait
17:45 UTC+3	Berrahma (yellow card) 5'; Ajibola (yellow card) 39'; El Ebrahim (yellow card) 78'	Report	Medrán (yellow card) 44'; Dembélé 45+8' (pen.), (yellow card) 77'; Al-Malki (yellow card) 59'; Al-Olayan (yellow card) 90'; Radif (yellow card) 90+5'	Stadium: Mohammed Al-Hamad Stadium; Referee: Ahmed Darwish (United Arab Emirates)

27 November 2024 3	Al-Arabi (Qatar)	1–2	(Saudi Arabia) Al-Ettifaq	Doha, Qatar
20:00 UTC+3	Alaaeldin (yellow card) 45+4'; Diallo 47'	Report	Toko Ekambi 18', 75'; Medrán (yellow card) 45+4'; Wijnaldum (yellow card) 61'; Dawran (yellow card) 90+3'	Stadium: Al Thumama Stadium; Referee: Mohanad Qasim Sarray (Iraq)

4 December 2024 4	Al-Ettifaq (Saudi Arabia)	5–0	(Qatar) Al-Arabi	Dammam, Saudi Arabia
20:00 UTC+3	Fofana 29'; Dembélé 39'; Radif 41', (yellow card) 44'; Vitinho 81'; Costa 88', (yellow card) 88'	Report	Al-Sulaiti (yellow card) 3'; Fathy (yellow card) 47'; Keddari (yellow card) 79'	Stadium: EGO Stadium; Attendance: 2,856; Referee: Mahmood Al-Majarafi (Oman)

5 February 2025 5	Al-Riffa (Bahrain)	2–1	(Saudi Arabia) Al-Ettifaq	Isa Town, Bahrain
20:15 UTC+3	Vargas 30'; Haram (yellow card) 53'; Fuentes 69'	Report	Toko Ekambi (yellow card) 41'; Fuentes 55' (o.g.)	Stadium: Khalifa Sports City Stadium; Referee: Omar Al Ali (United Arab Emirates)

18 February 2025 6	Al-Ettifaq (Saudi Arabia)	1–1	(Kuwait) Al-Qadsia	Dammam, Saudi Arabia
20:00 UTC+3	Bamsaud (yellow card) 26'; Gray 56'	Report	Soulah 36', (yellow card) 70'; Ajibola (yellow card) 60'	Stadium: EGO Stadium; Referee: Mahmood Al-Majarafi (Oman)

==== Knockout stage ====
===== Semi-finals =====
5 March 2025 First leg	Al-Ettifaq (Saudi Arabia)	0–1	(Iraq) Duhok	Dammam, Saudi Arabia
23:00 UTC+3	Madu (yellow card) 55'	Report	Marlon 43'; Darwich (yellow card) 64'	Stadium: EGO Stadium; Attendance: 6,932; Referee: Yahya Al-Balushi (Oman)

12 March 2025 Second leg	Duhok (Iraq)	1–0 (2–0 agg.)	(Saudi Arabia) Al-Ettifaq	Duhok, Iraq
21:00 UTC+3	Zakri (yellow card) 55'; Turci (yellow card) 71'; Allée (yellow card) 78'; Gwargis 90+5'	Report	Al-Olayan (yellow card) 38'	Stadium: Duhok Stadium; Referee: Ammar Mahfouz (Bahrain)

== Statistics ==
=== Appearances ===
Last updated on 26 May 2025.

No.	Pos	Nat	Player	Total		Pro League		King Cup		Gulf Club Champions League	
No.	Pos	Nat	Player	Apps	Goals	Apps	Goals	Apps	Goals	Apps	Goals
Goalkeepers
1	GK	(Slovakia) SVK	Marek Rodák	42	0	34	0	2	0	6	0
92	GK	(Saudi Arabia) KSA	Turki Baljoush	1	0	0	0	0	0	1	0
96	GK	(Saudi Arabia) KSA	Marwan Al-Haidari	1	0	0	0	0	0	1	0
Defenders
3	DF	(Saudi Arabia) KSA	Abdullah Madu	34	1	26+1	1	0+2	0	3+2	0
4	DF	(Scotland) SCO	Jack Hendry	21	0	15	0	0	0	6	0
12	DF	(Saudi Arabia) KSA	Turki Al-Madani	1	0	1	0	0	0	0	0
15	DF	(Saudi Arabia) KSA	Abdullah Al-Bishi	1	0	0	0	0	0	0+1	0
24	DF	(Saudi Arabia) KSA	Ahmed Bamsaud	11	0	1+6	0	0	0	3+1	0
25	DF	(Saudi Arabia) KSA	Abdulbasit Hindi	24	0	8+7	0	2	0	6+1	0
28	DF	(Saudi Arabia) KSA	Abdulrahman Sahhari	2	0	0	0	0	0	2	0
29	DF	(Saudi Arabia) KSA	Mohammed Abdulrahman	31	1	18+7	1	1+1	0	1+3	0
31	DF	(Tunisia) TUN	Wissam Chaouali	2	0	0	0	0	0	0+2	0
33	DF	(Saudi Arabia) KSA	Madallah Al-Olayan	36	1	20+6	1	1+1	0	6+2	0
61	DF	(Saudi Arabia) KSA	Radhi Al-Otaibi	34	0	20+7	0	2	0	4+1	0
70	DF	(Saudi Arabia) KSA	Abdullah Al-Khateeb	28	1	23+2	1	0	0	3	0
87	DF	(Saudi Arabia) KSA	Meshal Al-Sebyani	12	0	4+5	0	2	0	0+1	0
Midfielders
6	MF	(Saudi Arabia) KSA	Mukhtar Ali	16	0	12+3	0	0	0	1	0
8	MF	(Netherlands) NED	Georginio Wijnaldum	42	15	33+1	14	2	0	5+1	1
10	MF	(Spain) ESP	Álvaro Medrán	36	2	23+7	2	2	0	4	0
14	MF	(Brazil) BRA	Vitinho	37	8	23+8	6	1+1	1	1+3	1
26	MF	(Saudi Arabia) KSA	Jalal Al-Salem	4	0	2+2	0	0	0	0	0
27	MF	(Saudi Arabia) KSA	Mohammed Al-Qadhi	2	0	0	0	0	0	2	0
36	MF	(Colombia) COL	Josen Escobar	10	0	4+4	0	0	0	2	0
38	MF	(Saudi Arabia) KSA	Abdullah Al-Zahrani	2	0	0	0	0	0	0+2	0
46	MF	(Saudi Arabia) KSA	Abdulaziz Al-Aliwa	11	0	0+6	0	0	0	2+3	0
77	MF	(Saudi Arabia) KSA	Majed Dawran	10	0	0+6	0	0	0	1+3	0
88	MF	(Saudi Arabia) KSA	Abdulellah Al-Malki	30	0	9+13	0	1	0	7	0
Forwards
7	FW	(Cameroon) CMR	Karl Toko Ekambi	33	7	21+3	1	1+1	2	6+1	4
9	FW	(France) FRA	Moussa Dembélé	24	9	18+1	7	0+2	0	2+1	2
11	FW	(Jamaica) JAM	Demarai Gray	29	1	19+5	0	1	0	3+1	1
18	FW	(Portugal) POR	João Costa	30	5	16+8	4	2	0	2+2	1
21	FW	(Saudi Arabia) KSA	Abdullah Radif	36	4	13+15	3	1	0	5+2	1
99	FW	(Saudi Arabia) KSA	Mohammed Al-Eisa	1	0	0	0	0	0	0+1	0
Players sent out on loan this season
17	MF	(Saudi Arabia) KSA	Hassan Al-Musallam	0	0	0	0	0	0	0	0
19	MF	(Saudi Arabia) KSA	Khalid Al-Ghannam	0	0	0	0	0	0	0	0
20	FW	(Saudi Arabia) KSA	Thamer Al-Khaibari	2	0	0+2	0	0	0	0	0
23	GK	(Saudi Arabia) KSA	Ahmed Al-Rehaili	0	0	0	0	0	0	0	0
Player who made an appearance this season but have left the club
75	MF	(Ivory Coast) CIV	Seko Fofana	19	1	11+2	0	1+1	0	3+1	1

=== Goalscorers ===
Rank	No.	Pos	Nat	Name	Pro League	King Cup	Gulf Club Champions League	Total
1	8	MF	(Netherlands)	Georginio Wijnaldum	14	0	1	15
2	9	FW	(France)	Moussa Dembélé	7	0	2	9
3	14	MF	(Brazil)	Vitinho	6	1	1	8
4	7	FW	(Cameroon)	Karl Toko Ekambi	1	2	4	7
5	18	FW	(Portugal)	João Costa	4	0	1	5
6	21	FW	(Saudi Arabia)	Abdullah Radif	3	0	1	4
7	10	MF	(Spain)	Álvaro Medrán	2	0	0	2
8	3	DF	(Saudi Arabia)	Abdullah Madu	1	0	0	1
8	11	FW	(Jamaica)	Demarai Gray	0	0	1	1
8	29	DF	(Saudi Arabia)	Mohammed Abdulrahman	1	0	0	1
8	33	DF	(Saudi Arabia)	Madallah Al-Olayan	1	0	0	1
8	70	DF	(Saudi Arabia)	Abdullah Al-Khateeb	1	0	0	1
8	75	MF	(Ivory Coast)	Seko Fofana	0	0	1	1
Own goal					3	0	1	4
Total					44	3	13	60

Last Updated: 26 May 2025

=== Assists ===
Rank	No.	Pos	Nat	Name	Pro League	King Cup	Gulf Club Champions League	Total
1	14	MF	(Brazil)	Vitinho	7	0	0	7
2	8	MF	(Netherlands)	Georginio Wijnaldum	4	0	2	6
3	9	FW	(France)	Moussa Dembélé	4	0	1	5
4	10	MF	(Spain)	Álvaro Medrán	4	0	0	4
5	7	FW	(Cameroon)	Karl Toko Ekambi	2	0	1	3
6	21	FW	(Saudi Arabia)	Abdullah Radif	1	0	1	2
6	75	MF	(Ivory Coast)	Seko Fofana	0	0	2	2
8	11	FW	(Jamaica)	Demarai Gray	0	1	0	1
8	18	FW	(Portugal)	João Costa	1	0	0	1
8	29	DF	(Saudi Arabia)	Mohammed Abdulrahman	1	0	0	1
8	33	DF	(Saudi Arabia)	Madallah Al-Olayan	1	0	0	1
8	61	DF	(Saudi Arabia)	Radhi Al-Otaibi	1	0	0	1
8	70	DF	(Saudi Arabia)	Abdullah Al-Khateeb	1	0	0	1
Total					27	1	7	35

Last Updated: 26 May 2025

=== Clean sheets ===
Rank	No.	Pos	Nat	Name	Pro League	King Cup	Gulf Club Champions League	Total
1	1	GK	(Slovakia)	Marek Rodák	8	1	2	11
Total					8	1	2	11

Last Updated: 17 May 2025
