= 2025–26 Al-Ettifaq FC season =

Al-Ettifaq
2025–26 season
- President: Samer Al-Misehal
- Manager: Saad Al-Shehri
- Stadium: Al-Ettifaq Club Stadium
- Pro League: Pre-season
- King Cup: Round of 32
- All statistics correct as of 1 July 2025.

The 2025–26 season is Al-Ettifaq's 47th non-consecutive season in the Pro League and their 80th season in existence. The club will participate in the Pro League and the King Cup.

The season covers the period from 1 July 2025 to 30 June 2026.

== Players ==
=== First-team squad ===
As of 1 July 2025

Note: Flags indicate national team as defined under FIFA eligibility rules; some limited exceptions apply. Players may hold more than one non-FIFA nationality.

| No. | Pos. | Nation | Player |
|---|---|---|---|
| 1 | GK | SVK | Marek Rodák |
| 3 | DF | KSA | Abdullah Madu |
| 4 | DF | SCO | Jack Hendry |
| 6 | MF | KSA | Mukhtar Ali |
| 7 | FW | CMR | Karl Toko Ekambi |
| 8 | MF | NED | Georginio Wijnaldum (captain) |
| 9 | FW | FRA | Moussa Dembélé |
| 10 | MF | ESP | Álvaro Medrán |
| 12 | MF | KSA | Turki Al-Madani |
| 13 | DF | KSA | Hamdan Al-Shamrani |
| 14 | MF | BRA | Vitinho |
| 15 | FW | RSA | |
| 17 | MF | KSA | Hassan Al-Musallam |
| 18 | FW | POR | João Costa |
| 19 | MF | KSA | Khalid Al-Ghannam |
| 22 | GK | KSA | Bilal Al-Dawaa |
| 23 | GK | KSA | Ahmed Al-Rehaili |
| 24 | MF | KSA | Nawaf Hazazi |
| 25 | DF | KSA | Abdulbasit Hindi |

| No. | Pos. | Nation | Player |
|---|---|---|---|
| 27 | MF | KSA | Mohammed Al-Qadhi |
| 28 | DF | KSA | Abdulrahman Sahhari |
| 29 | DF | KSA | Mohammed Abdulrahman |
| 31 | DF | TUN | Wissam Chaouali |
| 32 | DF | COD | Marcel Tisserand |
| 33 | DF | KSA | Madallah Al-Olayan |
| 35 | MF | KSA | Abdullah Khalifah |
| 36 | MF | KSA | Faris Al-Ghamdi |
| 38 | MF | KSA | Abdullah Al-Zahrani |
| 51 | DF | KSA | Meshal Al-Alaeli |
| 61 | DF | KSA | Radhi Al-Otaibi |
| 70 | DF | KSA | Abdullah Al-Khateeb |
| 77 | MF | KSA | Majed Dawran |
| 87 | DF | KSA | Meshal Al-Sebyani |
| 92 | GK | KSA | Turki Baljoush |
| 99 | FW | KSA | Mohammed Al-Eisa |
| — | GK | KSA | Abdullah Al-Owaishir |
| — | FW | KSA | Redha Al-Abdullah |

== Transfers and loans ==
=== Transfers in ===
| Entry date | Position | No. | Player | From club | Fee | Ref. |
|---|---|---|---|---|---|---|
| 30 June 2025 | GK | 22 | (Saudi Arabia) Bilal Al-Dawaa | (Saudi Arabia) Al-Jandal | End of loan | |
| 30 June 2025 | GK | 23 | (Saudi Arabia) Ahmed Al-Rehaili | (Saudi Arabia) Al-Nassr | End of loan | |
| 30 June 2025 | GK | – | (Saudi Arabia) Abdullah Al-Owaishir | (Saudi Arabia) Al-Wehda | End of loan | |
| 30 June 2025 | DF | 13 | (Saudi Arabia) Meshal Al-Alaeli | (Saudi Arabia) Al-Wehda | End of loan | |
| 30 June 2025 | DF | 32 | (Democratic Republic of the Congo) Marcel Tisserand | (Saudi Arabia) Al-Khaleej | End of loan | |
| 30 June 2025 | DF | – | (Saudi Arabia) Hamdan Al-Shamrani | (Saudi Arabia) Al-Kholood | End of loan | |
| 30 June 2025 | MF | 6 | (Saudi Arabia) Faris Al-Ghamdi | (Saudi Arabia) Al-Sahel | End of loan | |
| 30 June 2025 | MF | 17 | (Saudi Arabia) Khalid Al-Ghannam | (Saudi Arabia) Al-Hilal | End of loan | |
| 30 June 2025 | MF | 35 | (Saudi Arabia) Abdullah Al-Dossary | (Saudi Arabia) Al-Safa | End of loan | |
| 30 June 2025 | MF | 80 | (Saudi Arabia) Hamed Al-Ghamdi | (Saudi Arabia) Al-Ittihad | End of loan | |
| 30 June 2025 | MF | 90 | (Saudi Arabia) Mohammed Mahzari | (Saudi Arabia) Al-Taawoun | End of loan | |
| 30 June 2025 | MF | – | (Saudi Arabia) Hassan Al-Musallam | (Saudi Arabia) Al-Khaleej | End of loan | |
| 30 June 2025 | MF | – | (Saudi Arabia) Nawaf Hazazi | (Saudi Arabia) Al-Sahel | End of loan | |
| 30 June 2025 | MF | – | (Turkey) Berat Özdemir | (Turkey) İstanbul Başakşehir | End of loan | |
| 30 June 2025 | FW | 20 | (Saudi Arabia) Thamer Al-Khaibari | (Saudi Arabia) Al-Raed | End of loan | |
| 30 June 2025 | FW | – | (Saudi Arabia) Redha Al-Abdullah | (Saudi Arabia) Al-Fayha | End of loan | |
| 13 July 2025 | FW | 15 | (South Africa) Mohau Nkota | (South Africa) Orlando Pirates | $1,400,000 | |
| 16 July 2025 | MF | 11 | (Slovakia) Ondrej Duda | (Italy) Hellas Verona | Free | |
| 22 July 2025 | GK | – | (Saudi Arabia) Abdulbasit Hawsawi | (Saudi Arabia) Damac | Free | |
| 31 July 2025 | MF | – | (Saudi Arabia) Ziyad Al-Ghamdi | (Saudi Arabia) Al-Ahli | Free | |
| 31 July 2025 | FW | – | (Egypt) Ahmed Hassan | (France) Le Havre | Free | |
| 5 August 2025 | DF | 5 | (Costa Rica) Francisco Calvo | (Turkey) Hatayspor | Free | |
| 21 August 2025 | DF | – | (Saudi Arabia) Ahmed Al-Omaisi | (Saudi Arabia) Jeddah | Free | |
| 9 September 2025 | FW | 71 | (Serbia) Matija Gluščević | (Serbia) Radnički 1923 | $470,000 | |

=== Transfers out ===
| Exit date | Position | No. | Player | To club | Fee | Ref. |
|---|---|---|---|---|---|---|
| 30 June 2025 | GK | 96 | (Saudi Arabia) Marwan Al-Haidari | (Saudi Arabia) Al-Khaleej | End of loan | |
| 30 June 2025 | DF | 24 | (Saudi Arabia) Ahmed Bamsaud | (Saudi Arabia) Al-Ittihad | End of loan | |
| 30 June 2025 | MF | 36 | (Colombia) Josen Escobar | (Colombia) América de Cali | End of loan | |
| 30 June 2025 | MF | 46 | (Saudi Arabia) Abdulaziz Al-Aliwa | (Saudi Arabia) Al-Nassr | End of loan | |
| 30 June 2025 | MF | 88 | (Saudi Arabia) Abdulellah Al-Malki | (Saudi Arabia) Al-Hilal | End of loan | |
| 30 June 2025 | FW | 21 | (Saudi Arabia) Abdullah Radif | (Saudi Arabia) Al-Hilal | End of loan | |
| 1 July 2025 | MF | 90 | (Saudi Arabia) Mohammed Mahzari | (Saudi Arabia) Al-Taawoun | $1,600,000 | |
| 1 July 2025 | MF | – | (Turkey) Berat Özdemir | (Turkey) İstanbul Başakşehir | Free | |
| 3 July 2025 | FW | 11 | (Jamaica) Demarai Gray | (England) Birmingham City | Free | |
| 18 July 2025 | MF | 80 | (Saudi Arabia) Hamed Al-Ghamdi | (Saudi Arabia) Al-Ittihad | $10,663,000 | |
| 18 July 2025 | FW | 20 | (Saudi Arabia) Thamer Al-Khaibari | (Saudi Arabia) Neom | $3,332,000 | |
| 19 July 2025 | MF | – | (Saudi Arabia) Nawaf Al-Janahi | (Saudi Arabia) Neom | $1,332,000 | |
| 31 July 2025 | DF | 29 | (Saudi Arabia) Mohammed Abdulrahman | (Saudi Arabia) Al-Ahli | $6,665,000 | |
| 8 August 2025 | DF | 27 | (Saudi Arabia) Hamdan Al-Shamrani | (Saudi Arabia) Al-Ula | Free | |
| 11 August 2025 | MF | 14 | (Brazil) Vitinho | (Brazil) Corinthians | Free | |
| 17 August 2025 | DF | 32 | (Democratic Republic of the Congo) Marcel Tisserand | (Australia) Sydney FC | Free | |
| 10 September 2025 | FW | 7 | (Cameroon) Karl Toko Ekambi | (Saudi Arabia) Al-Fateh | Free | |
| 12 September 2025 | GK | – | (Saudi Arabia) Abdullah Al-Owaishir | (Saudi Arabia) Al-Wehda | Free | |

=== Loans out ===
| Start date | End date | Position | No. | Player | To club | Fee | Ref. |
|---|---|---|---|---|---|---|---|
| 27 August 2025 | End of season | DF | – | (Saudi Arabia) Muhannad Al-Harthi | (Saudi Arabia) Al-Kholood | None | |
| 27 August 2025 | End of season | DF | – | (Saudi Arabia) Abdullah Al-Zori | (Saudi Arabia) Al-Kholood | None | |
| 2 September 2025 | End of season | DF | 31 | (Tunisia) Wissem Chaouali | (Saudi Arabia) Al-Jubail | None | |
| 8 September 2025 | End of season | MF | – | (Saudi Arabia) Nawaf Hazazi | (Saudi Arabia) Al-Jubail | None | |
| 9 September 2025 | End of season | GK | 23 | (Saudi Arabia) Ahmed Al-Rehaili | (Saudi Arabia) Al-Diriyah | None | |
| 10 September 2025 | End of season | DF | 13 | (Saudi Arabia) Meshal Al-Alaeli | (Saudi Arabia) Al-Taawoun | None | |

== Pre-season and friendlies ==
| 22 July 2025 Friendly | Al-Ettifaq (Saudi Arabia) | 2–2 | (Portugal) Portimonense | Albufeira, Portugal |
| 18:00 WEST | Hendry 44'; Al-Qadhi 52' | Report | Durán 6'; Acquah 59' | Stadium: Estadio Municipal de Albufeira |

| 29 July 2025 Friendly | Al-Ettifaq (Saudi Arabia) | 1–5 | (Portugal) Farense | Albufeira, Portugal |
| 18:00 WEST | Al-Bishi 90+3' | | Almeida 37' (pen.); Gjorgjev 39'; Costa 52'; Ribeiro 55' (pen.); Cuba 77' | Stadium: Estadio Municipal de Albufeira |

| 3 August 2025 Friendly | Al-Ettifaq (Saudi Arabia) | 0–0 | (Qatar) Al-Sadd | Marbella, Spain |
| 19:00 CEST | | Report | | Stadium: Marbella Football Center |

| 7 August 2025 Friendly | Al-Ettifaq (Saudi Arabia) | 3–1 | (Spain) Cádiz Mirandilla | Estepona, Spain |
| 11:00 CEST | Hindi 54'; F. Al-Ghamdi 66'; Z. Al-Ghamdi 67' | Report | Varela 13' | Stadium: Estepona Football Center |

| 7 August 2025 Friendly | Al-Ettifaq (Saudi Arabia) | 1–1 | (Spain) Cádiz | La Línea, Spain |
| 20:00 CEST | Calvo 48' | Report | Denia 66' | Stadium: Estadio Municipal de La Línea de la Concepción |

| 16 August 2025 Friendly | Al-Ettifaq (Saudi Arabia) | 2–2 | (Bahrain) Al-Riffa | Dammam, Saudi Arabia |
| 18:50 AST | Al-Ghannam 15'; Medrán 19' | Report | Ben Souda 13'; Yuri 40' (pen.) | Stadium: EGO Stadium |

| 21 August 2025 Friendly | Al-Ettifaq (Saudi Arabia) | 2–2 | (Saudi Arabia) Al-Khaleej | Dammam, Saudi Arabia |
| 18:50 AST | Al-Otaibi 18'; Calvo 54' | Report | Masouras 9'; Al-Amri 83' (pen.) | Stadium: EGO Stadium |

== Competitions ==
=== Overview ===
| Competition | Record | | | | | | | |
| Competition | Pld | W | D | L | GF | GA | GD | Win % |
|---|---|---|---|---|---|---|---|---|
| Pro League | 34 | 14 | 8 | 12 | 51 | 55 | −4 | 41.18 |
| King's Cup | 1 | 0 | 1 | 0 | 2 | 2 | +0 | 0.00 |
| Total | 35 | 14 | 9 | 12 | 53 | 57 | −4 | 40.00 |

Updated to match played 28 January 2026
Source: Competitions

=== Pro League ===
==== League table ====
| Pos | Team | Pld | W | D | L | GF | GA | GD | Pts | Qualification or relegation |
|---|---|---|---|---|---|---|---|---|---|---|
| 5 | Al-Ittihad | 34 | 16 | 7 | 11 | 55 | 48 | +7 | 55 | Qualification for AFC Champions League Elite preliminary stage |
| 6 | Al-Taawoun | 34 | 15 | 8 | 11 | 59 | 46 | +13 | 53 | Qualification for AFC Champions League Two group stage (Note: Since the winners of the 2025–26 King's Cup, Al-Hilal, had already qualified for the Champions League Elite, the spot given to the King's Cup winners (Champions League Two) was passed to the sixth-placed team.) |
| 7 | Al-Ettifaq | 34 | 14 | 8 | 12 | 51 | 55 | −4 | 50 | Qualification for AGCFF Gulf Club Champions League group stage |
| 8 | Neom | 34 | 12 | 9 | 13 | 43 | 48 | −5 | 45 | |
| 9 | Al-Hazem | 34 | 11 | 9 | 14 | 38 | 57 | −19 | 42 | |

Source: SPL
Rules for classification: 1) Points; 2) Head-to-head points; 3) Head-to-head goal difference; 4) Total goal difference; 5) Total goals scored; 6) Fair-play points
(Note: Head-to-head record is used only after all the matches between the teams in question have been played).

==== Results summary ====
| Overall | | | | | | | | Home | | | | | | Away | | | | | |
| Pld | W | D | L | GF | GA | GD | Pts | W | D | L | GF | GA | GD | W | D | L | GF | GA | GD |
|---|---|---|---|---|---|---|---|---|---|---|---|---|---|---|---|---|---|---|---|
| 18 | 8 | 5 | 5 | 27 | 30 | −3 | 29 | 3 | 4 | 2 | 12 | 14 | −2 | 5 | 1 | 3 | 15 | 16 | −1 |

Last updated: 28 January 2026.
Source: Saudi Pro League

==== Results by round ====
| Round | 1 | 2 | 3 | 4 | 5 | 6 | 7 | 8 | 9 | 11 | 12 | 13 | 14 | 15 | 16 | 17 | 18 | 19 | 20 | 21 | 22 | 23 | 10 | 24 | 25 | 26 | 27 | 28 | 29 | 30 | 31 | 32 | 33 | 34 |
|---|---|---|---|---|---|---|---|---|---|---|---|---|---|---|---|---|---|---|---|---|---|---|---|---|---|---|---|---|---|---|---|---|---|---|
| Ground | H | H | A | A | H | A | H | A | H | A | H | H | A | H | A | H | A | A | H | H | A | H | A | A | H | A | H | H | A | A | H | A | H | A |
| Result | W | D | L | W | L | L | D | D | W | W | D | W | W | L | W | D | W | L | | | | | | | | | | | | | | | | |
| Position | 6 | 6 | 9 | 8 | 11 | 11 | 11 | 11 | 9 | 8 | 8 | 8 | 7 | 7 | 7 | 7 | 7 | 7 | | | | | | | | | | | | | | | | |

Updated to match(es) played on 26 January 2026. Source: Saudi Pro League
A = Away; H = Home; W = Win; D = Draw; L = Loss

==== Matches ====
All times are local, AST (UTC+3).

Win Draw Loss Postponed

| 28 August 2025 1 | Al-Ettifaq | 2–1 | Al-Kholood | Dammam |
| 21:00 | Nkota 7'; Madu (yellow card) 13'; Medrán (yellow card) 47'; Wijnaldum 61'; Al-Ghamdi (yellow card) 88' | Report | Buckley 36', (yellow card) 45+2'; Solan (yellow card) 90+6' | Stadium: EGO Stadium; Attendance: 2,168; Referee: Faisal Al-Blwi |

| 12 September 2025 2 | Al-Ettifaq | 0–0 | Al-Ahli | Dammam |
| 18:25 | Calvo (yellow card) 61'; Al-Olayan (yellow card) 65'; Hendry (yellow card) 83'; Dahal (yellow card) 87' | Report | Hawsawi (yellow card) 51'; Ibañez (yellow card) 56'; Majrashi (yellow card) 84' | Stadium: EGO Stadium; Attendance: 9,782; Referee: Anastasios Sidiropoulos (Greece) |

| 18 September 2025 3 | Al-Taawoun | 4–1 | Al-Ettifaq | Buraidah |
| 18:40 | Al-Kuwaykibi 9'; Al-Ahmed (yellow card) 40', (goal) 51'; Mandash 56'; Martínez 70' (pen.); Hawsawi (yellow card) 82' | Report | Hassan (yellow card) 13'; Calvo (yellow card) 28'; Duda (yellow card) 58'; Rodák (yellow card) 67'; Al-Ghannam 82' | Stadium: Al-Taawoun Club Stadium; Attendance: 1,944; Referee: Majed Al-Shamrani |

| 26 September 2025 4 | Damac | 1–3 | Al-Ettifaq | Khamis Mushait |
| 18:40 | Vada 38'; Bedrane (yellow card) 67'; Abdullah (yellow card) 69'; Medina (yellow card) 72' | Report | Duda (yellow card) 1'; Al-Ghannam 40', 57'; Wijnaldum 65'; Madu (yellow card) 90'; Al-Ghamdi (yellow card) 90+3' | Stadium: Damac Club Stadium; Attendance: 2,581; Referee: Abdulsamad Bakri |

| 18 October 2025 5 | Al-Ettifaq | 0–5 | Al-Hilal | Dammam |
| 17:45 | | Report | Leonardo 23', 55'; N. Al-Dawsari (yellow card) 29'; Núñez 39', 74'; Neves 48' (pen.) | Stadium: EGO Stadium; Attendance: 10,187; Referee: Sebastian Gishamer (Austria) |

| 24 October 2025 6 | Al-Fateh | 2–1 | Al-Ettifaq | Al-Hasa |
| 17:45 | Saâdane (yellow card) 25'; Al-Zubaidi 45+4'; Fernandes 64'; Youssouf (yellow card) 86'; Qasheesh (yellow card) 90+4' | Report | Al-Ghannam (yellow card) 16'; Duda (yellow card) 20'; Dembélé 49' (pen.); Dahal (yellow card) 88' | Stadium: Maydan Tamweel Aloula; Attendance: 9,345; Referee: Khalid Al-Turais |

| 31 October 2025 7 | Al-Ettifaq | 2–2 | Al-Hazem | Dammam |
| 20:30 | Al-Ghannam 14'; Medrán (yellow card) 41'; Calvo (yellow card) 46'; Dembélé (red card) 57'; Nkota 90' | Report | Al-Dakheel (yellow card) 54'; Martins 63'; Al Somah 65'; Al-Khaibari (yellow card) 89' | Stadium: EGO Stadium; Attendance: 2,959; Referee: Ali Al-Qahtani |

| 8 November 2025 8 | Al-Shabab | 1–1 | Al-Ettifaq | Riyadh |
| 17:45 | Al-Othman 13', (yellow card) 61'; Al-Sibyani (yellow card) 24'; Al-Shuwayrikh (yellow card) 57'; Al-Subiani (yellow card) 82'; Matuq (yellow card) 82' | Report | Wijnaldum 86' (pen.) | Stadium: SHG Arena; Attendance: 1,895; Referee: Mohammed Al-Ismail |

| 22 November 2025 9 | Al-Ettifaq | 3–2 | Al-Fayha | Dammam |
| 17:25 | Dembélé 10', 27'; Wijnaldum 27' | Report | Al-Khaibari 65'; Benzia 82' | Stadium: EGO Stadium; Attendance: 2,992; Referee: Ahmed Al-Rumaikhani |

| 25 December 2025 11 | Al-Riyadh | 0–2 | Al-Ettifaq | Riyadh |
| 20:30 | Bayesh (yellow card) 44'; Al-Khaibari (red card) 51' | Report | Hendry (yellow card) 41'; Calvo 90'; Wijnaldum 90+5' | Stadium: Prince Faisal bin Fahd Sports City Stadium; Attendance: 891; Referee: Mohammed Al-Ismail |

| 30 December 2025 12 | Al-Ettifaq | 2–2 | Al-Nassr | Dammam |
| 20:30 | Wijnaldum 16', 80'; Al-Ghamdi (yellow card) 45+1' | Report | Wesley (yellow card) 2'; Al-Nasser (yellow card) 10'; Félix 47'; Ronaldo 67' | Stadium: EGO Stadium; Attendance: 9,512; Referee: Shukri Al-Hanfosh |

| 2 January 2026 13 | Al-Ettifaq | 2–0 | Al-Okhdood | Dammam |
| 17:35 | Wijnaldum 54', 76' (pen.); Al-Khateeb (yellow card) 57'; Al-Ghamdi (yellow card) 90+8' | Report | | Stadium: EGO Stadium; Attendance: 1,696; Referee: Mohammed Al-Hanfosh |

| 8 January 2026 14 | Al-Najma | 3–4 | Al-Ettifaq | Buraidah |
| 20:30 | Al-Tulayhi 72'; Jasim 73'; Lázaro 87' | Report | Al-Haleel 27' (o.g.); Dembélé 39', (yellow card) 45+4'; Calvo 42', 59'; Al-Ghannam (yellow card) 78' | Stadium: King Abdullah Sports City; Attendance: 231; Referee: Abdullah Al-Kharboush |

| 12 January 2026 15 | Al-Ettifaq | 1–2 | Al-Khaleej | Dammam |
| 20:30 | Dembélé 1'; Wijnaldum (yellow card) 29'; Duda (yellow card) 43' | Report | Fortounis 45' (pen.); Hendry 86' (o.g.); Moris (yellow card) 90+4' | Stadium: EGO Stadium; Attendance: 2,419; Referee: Mohammed Al-Ismail |

| 16 January 2026 16 | Al-Ittihad | 0–1 | Al-Ettifaq | Jeddah |
| 20:30 | Fernandes (yellow card) 21'; Doumbia (yellow card) 27'; Rajković (red card) 85' | Report | Al-Khateeb (yellow card) 49'; Al-Ghannam 54'; Al-Ghamdi (yellow card) 56'; Rodák (yellow card) 69'; Hindi (yellow card) 86'; Medrán (yellow card) 90+5' | Stadium: Alinma Stadium; Attendance: 28,363; Referee: Abdullah Al-Owaydan |

| 21 January 2026 17 | Al-Ettifaq | 0–0 | Neom | Dammam |
| 20:30 | Hendry (yellow card) 74'; Medrán (yellow card) 88'; Calvo (yellow card) 90+1' | Report | Al-Dawsari (yellow card) 90+5' | Stadium: EGO Stadium; Attendance: 3,194; Referee: Ahmed Al-Rumaikhani |

| 24 January 2026 18 | Al-Kholood | 1–2 | Al-Ettifaq | Ar Rass |
| 18:20 | Enrique 16'; Sawaan (yellow card) 48'; Pinas (yellow card) 90+5' | Report | Duda (yellow card) 13'; Al-Ghamdi (yellow card) 42'; Ali (yellow card) 45+2'; Al-Ghannam 50', 83'; Al-Khateeb (yellow card) 90+6' | Stadium: Al-Hazem Club Stadium; Attendance: 1,596; Referee: Mohammed Al-Hoaish |

| 28 January 2026 19 | Al-Ahli | 4–0 | Al-Ettifaq | Jeddah |
| 20:30 | Toney 17', 27' (pen.), 83' (pen.); Atangana 64' | Report | Al-Sebyani (yellow card) 47' | Stadium: Alinma Stadium; Attendance: 38,870; Referee: Faisal Al-Blwi |

| 19 December 2025 10 | Al-Qadsiah | v | Al-Ettifaq | Dammam |
| 17:30 | | | | Stadium: Prince Mohamed bin Fahd Stadium |

=== King's Cup ===
All times are local, AST (UTC+3).

| 21 September 2025 Round of 32 | Al-Batin | 2–2 (a.e.t.) (4–2 p) | Al-Ettifaq | Hafar al-Batin |
| 18:30 | Al-Khathlan 40'; Al-Sahli 90+3'; Al-Shelali (yellow card) 96'; Fawaz (yellow card) 98'; Falette (yellow card) 115' | Report | Hassan 18'; Wijnaldum 47'; Duda (yellow card) 52'; Medrán (yellow card) 76'; Nkota (yellow card) 90+5'; Calvo (yellow card) 120+5' | Stadium: Al-Batin Club Stadium; Referee: Abdullah Al-Shehri |
| | Penalties |
| | Al-Sahli (penalty scored); Al-Khathlan (penalty scored); M'Changama (penalty scored); Al-Shelali (penalty scored) | | (penalty scored) Wijnaldum; (penalty scored) Medrán; (penalty missed) Duda; (penalty missed) Calvo |

== Statistics ==
=== Appearances ===
Last updated on 28 January 2026.

| No. | Pos | Nat | Player | Total | | Pro League | | King's Cup | |
| No. | Pos | Nat | Player | Apps | Goals | Apps | Goals | Apps | Goals |
Goalkeepers
| 1 | GK | (Slovakia) SVK | Marek Rodák | 19 | 0 | 18 | 0 | 1 | 0 |
| 22 | GK | (Saudi Arabia) KSA | Abdulbasit Hawsawi | 0 | 0 | 0 | 0 | 0 | 0 |
| 24 | GK | (Saudi Arabia) KSA | Belal Al-Dawaa | 0 | 0 | 0 | 0 | 0 | 0 |
| 92 | GK | (Saudi Arabia) KSA | Turki Baljoush | 0 | 0 | 0 | 0 | 0 | 0 |
Defenders
| 3 | DF | (Saudi Arabia) KSA | Abdullah Madu | 9 | 0 | 7+2 | 0 | 0 | 0 |
| 4 | DF | (Scotland) SCO | Jack Hendry | 19 | 0 | 18 | 0 | 1 | 0 |
| 5 | DF | (Costa Rica) CRC | Francisco Calvo | 18 | 3 | 17 | 3 | 1 | 0 |
| 12 | DF | (Saudi Arabia) KSA | Awad Dahal | 6 | 0 | 1+4 | 0 | 1 | 0 |
| 14 | DF | (Saudi Arabia) KSA | Turki Al-Madani | 0 | 0 | 0 | 0 | 0 | 0 |
| 33 | DF | (Saudi Arabia) KSA | Madallah Al-Olayan | 9 | 0 | 3+6 | 0 | 0 | 0 |
| 37 | DF | (Saudi Arabia) KSA | Abdulbasit Hindi | 8 | 0 | 6+2 | 0 | 0 | 0 |
| 61 | DF | (Saudi Arabia) KSA | Radhi Al-Otaibi | 15 | 0 | 9+5 | 0 | 0+1 | 0 |
| 70 | DF | (Saudi Arabia) KSA | Abdullah Al-Khateeb | 17 | 0 | 14+2 | 0 | 1 | 0 |
| 87 | DF | (Saudi Arabia) KSA | Meshal Al-Sebyani | 6 | 0 | 0+6 | 0 | 0 | 0 |
Midfielders
| 6 | MF | (Saudi Arabia) KSA | Faris Al-Ghamdi | 12 | 0 | 6+5 | 0 | 0+1 | 0 |
| 7 | MF | (Saudi Arabia) KSA | Mukhtar Ali | 19 | 0 | 13+5 | 0 | 0+1 | 0 |
| 8 | MF | (Netherlands) NED | Georginio Wijnaldum | 18 | 10 | 16+1 | 9 | 1 | 1 |
| 10 | MF | (Spain) ESP | Álvaro Medrán | 17 | 0 | 15+1 | 0 | 1 | 0 |
| 11 | MF | (Slovakia) SVK | Ondrej Duda | 16 | 0 | 14+1 | 0 | 1 | 0 |
| 17 | MF | (Saudi Arabia) KSA | Khalid Al-Ghannam | 18 | 7 | 10+7 | 7 | 1 | 0 |
| 18 | MF | (Portugal) POR | João Costa | 5 | 0 | 2+3 | 0 | 0 | 0 |
| 24 | MF | (Saudi Arabia) KSA | Jalal Al-Salem | 3 | 0 | 0+3 | 0 | 0 | 0 |
| 29 | MF | (Saudi Arabia) KSA | Ziyad Al-Ghamdi | 7 | 0 | 0+7 | 0 | 0 | 0 |
| 58 | MF | (Saudi Arabia) KSA | Yasir Al-Shammari | 1 | 0 | 0+1 | 0 | 0 | 0 |
| 60 | MF | (Saudi Arabia) KSA | Abdulrahman Nabza | 1 | 0 | 0+1 | 0 | 0 | 0 |
| 77 | MF | (Saudi Arabia) KSA | Majed Dawran | 14 | 0 | 3+10 | 0 | 0+1 | 0 |
Forwards
| 9 | FW | (France) FRA | Moussa Dembélé | 12 | 5 | 11+1 | 5 | 0 | 0 |
| 15 | FW | (South Africa) RSA | Mohau Nkota | 15 | 2 | 12+2 | 2 | 0+1 | 0 |
| 19 | FW | (Egypt) EGY | Ahmed Hassan | 6 | 1 | 3+2 | 0 | 1 | 1 |
| 71 | FW | (Serbia) SRB | Matija Gluščević | 2 | 0 | 0+1 | 0 | 1 | 0 |
Players sent out on loan this season
| 13 | DF | (Saudi Arabia) KSA | Meshal Al-Alaeli | 0 | 0 | 0 | 0 | 0 | 0 |
| 23 | GK | (Saudi Arabia) KSA | Ahmed Al-Rehaili | 0 | 0 | 0 | 0 | 0 | 0 |

=== Goalscorers ===
| Rank | No. | Pos | Nat | Name | Pro League | King Cup | Total |
|---|---|---|---|---|---|---|---|
| 1 | 8 | MF | (Netherlands) | Georginio Wijnaldum | 9 | 1 | 10 |
| 2 | 17 | MF | (Saudi Arabia) | Khalid Al-Ghannam | 7 | 0 | 7 |
| 3 | 9 | FW | (France) | Moussa Dembélé | 5 | 0 | 5 |
| 4 | 5 | DF | (Costa Rica) | Francisco Calvo | 3 | 0 | 3 |
| 5 | 15 | FW | (South Africa) | Mohau Nkota | 2 | 0 | 2 |
| 6 | 19 | FW | (Egypt) | Ahmed Hassan | 0 | 1 | 1 |
| Own goal | | | | | 1 | 0 | 1 |
| Total | | | | | 27 | 2 | 29 |

Last Updated: 24 January 2026

=== Assists ===
| Rank | No. | Pos | Nat | Name | Pro League | King Cup | Total |
|---|---|---|---|---|---|---|---|
| 1 | 5 | DF | (Costa Rica) | Francisco Calvo | 1 | 2 | 3 |
| 1 | 8 | MF | (Netherlands) | Georginio Wijnaldum | 3 | 0 | 3 |
| 1 | 10 | MF | (Spain) | Álvaro Medrán | 3 | 0 | 3 |
| 1 | 17 | MF | (Saudi Arabia) | Khalid Al-Ghannam | 3 | 0 | 3 |
| 5 | 6 | MF | (Saudi Arabia) | Faris Al-Ghamdi | 2 | 0 | 2 |
| 5 | 15 | FW | (South Africa) | Mohau Nkota | 2 | 0 | 2 |
| 7 | 9 | FW | (France) | Moussa Dembélé | 1 | 0 | 1 |
| 7 | 18 | MF | (Portugal) | João Costa | 1 | 0 | 1 |
| 7 | 33 | DF | (Saudi Arabia) | Madallah Al-Olayan | 1 | 0 | 1 |
| 7 | 61 | DF | (Saudi Arabia) | Radhi Al-Otaibi | 1 | 0 | 1 |
| 7 | 70 | DF | (Saudi Arabia) | Abdullah Al-Khateeb | 1 | 0 | 1 |
| 7 | 77 | MF | (Saudi Arabia) | Majed Dawran | 1 | 0 | 1 |
| Total | | | | | 18 | 2 | 20 |

Last Updated: 24 January 2026

=== Clean sheets ===
| Rank | No. | Pos | Nat | Name | Pro League | King Cup | Total |
|---|---|---|---|---|---|---|---|
| 1 | 1 | GK | (Slovakia) | Marek Rodák | 5 | 0 | 5 |
| Total | | | | | 5 | 0 | 5 |

Last Updated: 21 January 2026
