= 2024–25 AGCFF Gulf Club Champions League =

دوري أبطال الخليج للأندية 2024–25

Tournament details
- Dates: 22 October 2024 – 15 April 2025
- Teams: 8 (from 1 confederation) (from 8 associations)

Final positions
- Champions: (Iraq) Duhok (1st title)
- Runners-up: (Kuwait) Al-Qadsia

Tournament statistics
- Matches played: 30
- Goals scored: 76 (2.53 per match)
- Top scorer: (United Arab Emirates) Ali Mabkhout (4 goals)
- Best player: (Iraq) Haron Ahmed
- Best goalkeeper: (Kuwait) Khaled Al-Rashidi

The 2024–25 AGCFF Gulf Club Champions League was the 31st edition of the football competition for clubs from the eight member nations of the Arab Gulf Cup Football Federation (AGCFF).

It was the first edition of the competition organised by the AGCFF under its new name and format, with clubs from Iraq and Yemen participating for the first time. The last edition of the tournament was held in 2015, when the competition was organised by the Gulf Cooperation Council (GCC).

The winners of the competition were Duhok, who won their first title with a 2–1 aggregate victory over Al-Qadsia in the final.

== Teams ==
Team	Qualification method	App. (last)
(Bahrain) Al-Riffa	2023–24 Bahraini Premier League runners-up	12th (2012)
(Iraq) Duhok	2023–24 Iraq Stars League regional competition play-off winners	1st
(Kuwait) Al-Qadsia	2023–24 Kuwaiti Premier League third place	6th (2008)
(Oman) Dhofar	2023–24 Sultan Qaboos Cup winners	11th (2011)
(Qatar) Al-Arabi	2023–24 Qatar Stars League fifth place	12th (2015)
(Saudi Arabia) Al-Ettifaq	2023–24 Saudi Pro League sixth place	7th (2009)
(United Arab Emirates) Al-Nasr	2023–24 UAE President's Cup runners-up	5th (2015)
(Yemen) Al-Ahli Sanaa	2023–24 Yemeni League champions	1st

Notes

1. Saudi Arabia (KSA): The 2023–24 Saudi Pro League's fifth-placed team, Al-Ittihad, declined to participate in the tournament.

=== Draw ===
The draw was held on 23 September 2024. The eight teams were drawn into two groups of four, by selecting one team from each of the four ranked pots. For the draw, the clubs were allocated to four pots based on the FIFA World Rankings of their nations as at 19 September 2024.

Pot 1	Pot 2	Pot 3	Pot 4
(Qatar) Al-Arabi (Iraq) Duhok	(Saudi Arabia) Al-Ettifaq (United Arab Emirates) Al-Nasr	(Bahrain) Al-Riffa (Oman) Dhofar	(Kuwait) Al-Qadsia (Yemen) Al-Ahli Sanaa

== Group stage ==
Tiebreakers
Teams were ranked according to points (3 points for a win, 1 point for a draw, 0 points for a loss), and if tied on points, the following tiebreaking criteria were applied, in the order given, to determine the rankings:
1. Points in head-to-head matches among tied teams;
2. Goal difference in head-to-head matches among tied teams;
3. Goals scored in head-to-head matches among tied teams;
4. If more than two teams were tied, and after applying all head-to-head criteria above, a subset of teams were still tied, all head-to-head criteria above were reapplied exclusively to this subset of teams;
5. Goal difference in all group matches;
6. Goals scored in all group matches;
7. Disciplinary points (yellow card = 1 point, red card as a result of two yellow cards = 3 points, direct red card = 3 points, yellow card followed by direct red card = 4 points);
8. Drawing of lots.

=== Group A ===
Pos	Team	Pld	W	D	L	GF	GA	GD	Pts	Qualification	NSR	DHK	DHO	AHL
1	(United Arab Emirates) Al-Nasr	6	4	2	0	14	7	+7	14	Knockout stage	—	2–1	5–2	0–0
2	(Iraq) Duhok	6	2	3	1	10	6	+4	9	Knockout stage	2–2	—	1–1	2–0
3	(Oman) Dhofar	6	1	2	3	7	12	−5	5		1–2	1–1	—	0–2
4	(Yemen) Al-Ahli Sanaa	6	1	1	4	4	10	−6	4		1–3	0–3	1–2	—

Source: GSA
Rules for classification: Group stage tiebreakers
22 October 2024
18:00 UTC+4

Al-Nasr (United Arab Emirates)	5–2	(Oman) Dhofar
Taarabt 5', 60'; Al-Suri 70' (o.g.); Ndiaye 72'; Jashak 75'	Report	Al-Maghani 26'; Adeniji 90+2'

Al Maktoum Stadium, Dubai
Referee: Majed Al-Shamrani (Saudi Arabia)
22 October 2024
20:00 UTC+3

Duhok (Iraq)	2–0	(Yemen) Al-Ahli Sanaa
Darwich 57'; Younis 90+2'	Report

Duhok Stadium, Duhok
Referee: Mohammed Al-Shammari (Qatar)

6 November 2024
18:00 UTC+4

Dhofar (Oman)	1–1	(Iraq) Duhok
Al-Nahar 22' (pen.)	Report	El Bahri 75'

Al-Saada Stadium, Salalah
Referee: Husain Al Showaikh (Bahrain)
6 November 2024
20:00 UTC+3

Al-Ahli Sanaa (Yemen)	1–3	(United Arab Emirates) Al-Nasr
Al-Haimi 43'	Report	Mabkout 8', 11'; Al-Naaimi 38'

Abdullah bin Khalifa Stadium, Doha
Referee: Abdullah Al-Kandari (Kuwait)

26 November 2024
20:00 UTC+3

Duhok (Iraq)	2–2	(United Arab Emirates) Al-Nasr
Zakri 25'; Acquah 90'	Report	Mabkhout 53' (pen.); Gláuber 76'

Duhok Stadium, Duhok
Referee: Salman Falahi (Qatar)
27 November 2024
18:00 UTC+4

Dhofar (Oman)	0–2	(Yemen) Al-Ahli Sanaa
	Report	Al Khyat 40', 76'

Al-Saada Stadium, Salalah
Referee: Khaled Al-Teris (Saudi Arabia)

3 December 2024
19:00 UTC+4

Al-Nasr (United Arab Emirates)	2–1	(Iraq) Duhok
Taarabt 21'; Mabkhout 29'	Report	Abdulla 58'

Al Maktoum Stadium, Dubai
Referee: Mohammed Al Hoish (Saudi Arabia)
3 December 2024
20:00 UTC+3

Al-Ahli Sanaa (Yemen)	1–2	(Oman) Dhofar
Suanon 79'	Report	Al-Saadi 13'; Al-Maghani 76'

Abdullah bin Khalifa Stadium, Doha
Referee: Abdulrahman Al-Jassim (Qatar)

4 February 2025
19:15 UTC+4

Dhofar (Oman)	1–2	(United Arab Emirates) Al-Nasr
Al Saadi 39'	Report	Seferovic 60', 78'

Al-Saada Stadium, Salalah
Referee: Majed Al-Shamrani (Saudi Arabia)
4 February 2025
20:15 UTC+3

Al-Ahli Sanaa (Yemen)	0–3	(Iraq) Duhok
	Report	Abubakir 7'; Gwargis 77' (pen.); Zakri 90+7' (pen.)

Abdullah bin Khalifa Stadium, Doha
Referee: Ammar Mahfoodh (Bahrain)

19 February 2025
20:00 UTC+4

Al-Nasr (United Arab Emirates)	0–0	(Yemen) Al-Ahli Sanaa
	Report

Al Maktoum Stadium, Dubai
Referee: Ismaeel Habib Ali (Bahrain)
19 February 2025
19:00 UTC+3

Duhok (Iraq)	1–1	(Oman) Dhofar
Ghazi 46'	Report	Al-Hamhami 52'

Duhok Stadium, Duhok
Referee: Mohammed Al-Sherif (Qatar)

=== Group B ===
Pos	Team	Pld	W	D	L	GF	GA	GD	Pts	Qualification	ETT	QAD	RIF	ARB
1	(Saudi Arabia) Al-Ettifaq	6	4	1	1	13	5	+8	13	Knockout stage	—	1–1	3–1	5–0
2	(Kuwait) Al-Qadsia	6	2	3	1	8	5	+3	9	Knockout stage	0–1	—	1–0	3–0
3	(Bahrain) Al-Riffa	6	2	2	2	8	8	0	8		2–1	2–2	—	2–0
4	(Qatar) Al-Arabi	6	0	2	4	3	14	−11	2		1–2	1–1	1–1	—

Source: GSA
Rules for classification: Group stage tiebreakers
23 October 2024
18:15 UTC+3

Al-Arabi (Qatar)	1–1	(Kuwait) Al-Qadsia
Verratti 71'	Report	Rossi 56'

Al Thumama Stadium, Doha
Referee: Adel Al Naqbi (United Arab Emirates)
23 October 2024
20:15 UTC+3

Al-Ettifaq (Saudi Arabia)	3–1	(Bahrain) Al-Riffa
Toko Ekambi 44', 49'; Wijnaldum 90+2'	Report	Vargas 42'

Al-Ettifaq Club Stadium, Dammam
Referee: Omar Al-Yaqoubi (Oman)

5 November 2024
17:45 UTC+3

Al-Qadsia (Kuwait)	0–1	(Saudi Arabia) Al-Ettifaq
	Report	Dembélé 45+8' (pen.)

Mohammed Al-Hamad Stadium, Hawally
Referee: Ahmed Darwish (United Arab Emirates)
5 November 2024
20:00 UTC+3

Al-Riffa (Bahrain)	2–0	(Qatar) Al-Arabi
Al-Asfoor 42'; Al-Hallak 58'	Report

Khalifa Sports City Stadium, Isa Town
Referee: Mohammed Ahmed (Iraq)

27 November 2024
18:00 UTC+3

Al-Riffa (Bahrain)	2–2	(Kuwait) Al-Qadsia
Frioui 31', 45+2'	Report	Khafi 24'; Al-Mutawa 90+1'

Khalifa Sports City Stadium, Isa Town
Referee: Ahmed Al-Kaf (Oman)
27 November 2024
20:00 UTC+3

Al-Arabi (Qatar)	1–2	(Saudi Arabia) Al-Ettifaq
Diallo 47'	Report	Toko Ekambi 18', 74'

Al Thumama Stadium, Doha
Referee: Mohanad Qasim Sarray (Iraq)

4 December 2024
17:45 UTC+3

Al-Qadsia (Kuwait)	1–0	(Bahrain) Al-Riffa
Khafi 28'	Report

Mohammed Al-Hamad Stadium, Hawally
Referee: Zaid Thamer Mohammed (Iraq)
4 December 2024
20:00 UTC+3

Al-Ettifaq (Saudi Arabia)	5–0	(Qatar) Al-Arabi
Fofana 29'; Dembélé 40'; Radif 41'; Vitinho 81'; Costa 88'	Report

Al-Ettifaq Club Stadium, Dammam
Referee: Mahmood Al-Majarafi (Oman)

5 February 2025
18:15 UTC+3

Al-Qadsia (Kuwait)	3–0	(Qatar) Al-Arabi
Berrahma 28'; Al-Mutar 39'; Al-Mutawa 90+7' (pen.)	Report

Mohammed Al-Hamad Stadium, Hawally
Referee: Omar Al-Yaqoubi (Oman)
5 February 2025
20:15 UTC+3

Al-Riffa (Bahrain)	2–1	(Saudi Arabia) Al-Ettifaq
Vargas 30'; Fuentes 69'	Report	Fuentes 55' (o.g.)

Khalifa Sports City Stadium, Isa Town
Referee: Omar Al Ali (United Arab Emirates)

18 February 2025
20:00 UTC+3

Al-Ettifaq (Saudi Arabia)	1–1	(Kuwait) Al-Qadsia
Gray 56'	Report	Soulah 36'

Al-Ettifaq Club Stadium, Dammam
Referee: Mahmood Al-Majarafi (Oman)
18 February 2025
20:00 UTC+3

Al-Arabi (Qatar)	1–1	(Bahrain) Al-Riffa
Alaaeldin 6'	Report	Frioui 50'

Al Thumama Stadium, Doha
Referee: Yousif Saeed Hasan (Iraq)

== Knockout stage ==
=== Bracket ===
Semi-finals
(United Arab Emirates) Al-Nasr	0	2	2 (3)
(Kuwait) Al-Qadsia (p)	1	1	2 (4)
(Saudi Arabia) Al-Ettifaq	0	0	0
(Iraq) Duhok	1	1	2

Final
(Kuwait) Al-Qadsia	0	1	1
(Iraq) Duhok	0	2	2

=== Semi-finals ===
Team 1	Agg.	Team 2	1st leg	2nd leg
Al-Nasr (United Arab Emirates)	2–2 (3–4 p)	(Kuwait) Al-Qadsia	0–1	2–1 (a.e.t.)
Al-Ettifaq (Saudi Arabia)	0–2	(Iraq) Duhok	0–1	0–1

4 March 2025
22:00 UTC+4

Al-Nasr (United Arab Emirates)	0–1	(Kuwait) Al-Qadsia
	Report	Khafi 39'

Al Maktoum Stadium, Dubai
Referee: Abdulrahman Al-Jassim (Qatar)
11 March 2025
22:00 UTC+3

Al-Qadsia (Kuwait)	1–2 (a.e.t.)	(United Arab Emirates) Al-Nasr
Al-Mutawa 77'	Report	Oliveira 16'; Memišević 56'
Penalties
Al-Mutawa (penalty scored); Wadi (penalty missed); Dehiri (penalty scored); Al-Shamali (penalty scored); El Ebrahim (penalty missed); Khaled (penalty scored)	4–3	(penalty scored) Oliveira; (penalty scored) Idrees; (penalty missed) Fer; (penalty scored) Azarkan; (penalty missed) Alemão; (penalty missed) Memišević

Mohammed Al-Hamad Stadium, Hawally
Referee: Omar Al-Yaqoubi (Oman)

5 March 2025
23:00 UTC+3

Al-Ettifaq (Saudi Arabia)	0–1	(Iraq) Duhok
	Report	Marlon 43'

Al-Ettifaq Club Stadium, Dammam
Referee: Yahya Ahmed Al Balushi (Oman)
12 March 2025
21:00 UTC+3

Duhok (Iraq)	1–0	(Saudi Arabia) Al-Ettifaq
Gwargis 90+5'	Report

Duhok Stadium, Duhok
Referee: Ammar Mahfouz (Bahrain)

=== Final ===
Team 1	Agg.	Team 2	1st leg	2nd leg
Al-Qadsia (Kuwait)	1–2	(Iraq) Duhok	0–0	1–2

8 April 2025
19:45 UTC+3

Al-Qadsia (Kuwait)	0–0	(Iraq) Duhok
	Report

Mohammed Al-Hamad Stadium, Hawally
Referee: Majed Al-Shamrani (Saudi Arabia)
15 April 2025
19:00 UTC+3

Duhok (Iraq)	2–1	(Kuwait) Al-Qadsia
Ageed 66'; Marlon 90+3'	Report	Soulah 70'

Duhok Stadium, Duhok
Referee: Qasim Al-Hatmi (Oman)

== Prize money and awards ==
=== Prize money ===
Position	Amount (USD)
Champions	3,000,000
Runners-up	1,000,000

=== Player awards ===
The following awards were given:

Award	Player
Top Scorer	(United Arab Emirates) Ali Mabkhout
Most Valuable Player	(Iraq) Haron Ahmed
Best Goalkeeper	(Kuwait) Khaled Al-Rashidi

== See also ==
- 26th Arabian Gulf Cup
