= João Cesco =

Brazilian footballer (born 2002)

Personal information
- Full name: João Victor Costa Cesco
- Date of birth: 24 January 2001 (age 25)
- Place of birth: Umuarama, Brazil
- Height: 1.89 m (6 ft 2 in)
- Position: Defender

Team information
- Current team: Enosis Neon Paralimni
- Number: 43

Youth career
- –2019: Palmeiras
- 2019–2020: Verona Primavera

Senior career*
Years	Team	Apps	(Gls)
2020–2023	Chapecoense	3	(0)
2023–2024	Hebar Pazardzhik	25	(1)
2024–2025	Tondela	1	(0)
2025–	Enosis Neon Paralimni	9	(1)
- * Club domestic league appearances and goals as of 24 November 2025

João Victor Costa Cesco (born 24 January 2001) is a Brazilian footballer who plays as a defender for Cypriot club Enosis Neon Paralimni.

== Career ==
João Cesco spent his youth years at the academy of Palmeiras to 2019. In August 2019, he was transferred to Verona Primavera. From October 2020 to July 2023 he was part of Chapecoense.

On 11 July 2023 he signed with Hebar Pazardzhik.

== Personal life ==
Cesco is the brother of the Portugal youth international footballer João Costa.
