= Mohammed Abdulrahman (footballer, born 2003) =

Saudi Arabian footballer (born 2000)

Mohammed Abdulrahman محمد عبدالرحمن
Personal information
- Full name: Mohammed Abdulrahman Yousef
- Date of birth: 14 January 2003 (age 23)
- Place of birth: Medina, Saudi Arabia
- Height: 1.70 m (5 ft 7 in)
- Position: Right back

Team information
- Current team: Al-Ahli
- Number: 29

Youth career
- –2021: Al-Ansar
- 2021–2023: Al-Ettifaq

Senior career*
Years	Team	Apps	(Gls)
2023–2025	Al-Ettifaq	51	(1)
2025–	Al-Ahli	31	(0)

International career
2024–	Saudi Arabia U23	5	(1)
- * Club domestic league appearances and goals as of 30 October 2026

Mohammed Abdulrahman (Arabic: محمد عبدالرحمن; born 14 January 2003) is a Saudi Arabian professional footballer who plays as a right back for Saudi Pro League club Al-Ahli.

== Club career ==
Mohammed Abdulrahman began his career at the youth team of Al-Ansar. On 28 July 2021, Abdulrahman joined Al-Ettifaq on a five-year deal. On 14 August 2023, Abdulrahman made his debut for Al-Ettifaq in the 2–1 league win against Al-Nassr. He came off the bench and replaced Sanousi Hawsawi in the 72nd minute. On 18 August 2023, Abdulrahman made his first start for the club in the 2–0 win against Al-Hazem. On 6 September 2023, Abdulrahman renewed his contract with Al-Ettifaq until 2028.

On 31 July 2025, Abdulrahman joined Al-Ahli on a three-year deal.

== Career statistics ==
=== Club ===
As of match played 27 May 2025

Club	Season	League		King Cup		Asia		Other		Total	
Club	Season	Apps	Goals	Apps	Goals	Apps	Goals	Apps	Goals	Apps	Goals
Al-Ettifaq	2023–24	26	0	2	0	—		—		28	0
Al-Ettifaq	2024–25	25	1	2	0	—		4 (Note: Appearances in AGCFF Gulf Club Champions League)	0	31	1
Al-Ettifaq	Total	51	1	4	0	0	0	4	0	59	1
Al-Ahli	2025–26	0	0	0	0	0	0	0	0	0	0
Career totals		51	1	4	0	0	0	4	0	59	1
