= Yannick Zakri =

Ivorian footballer (born 1991)

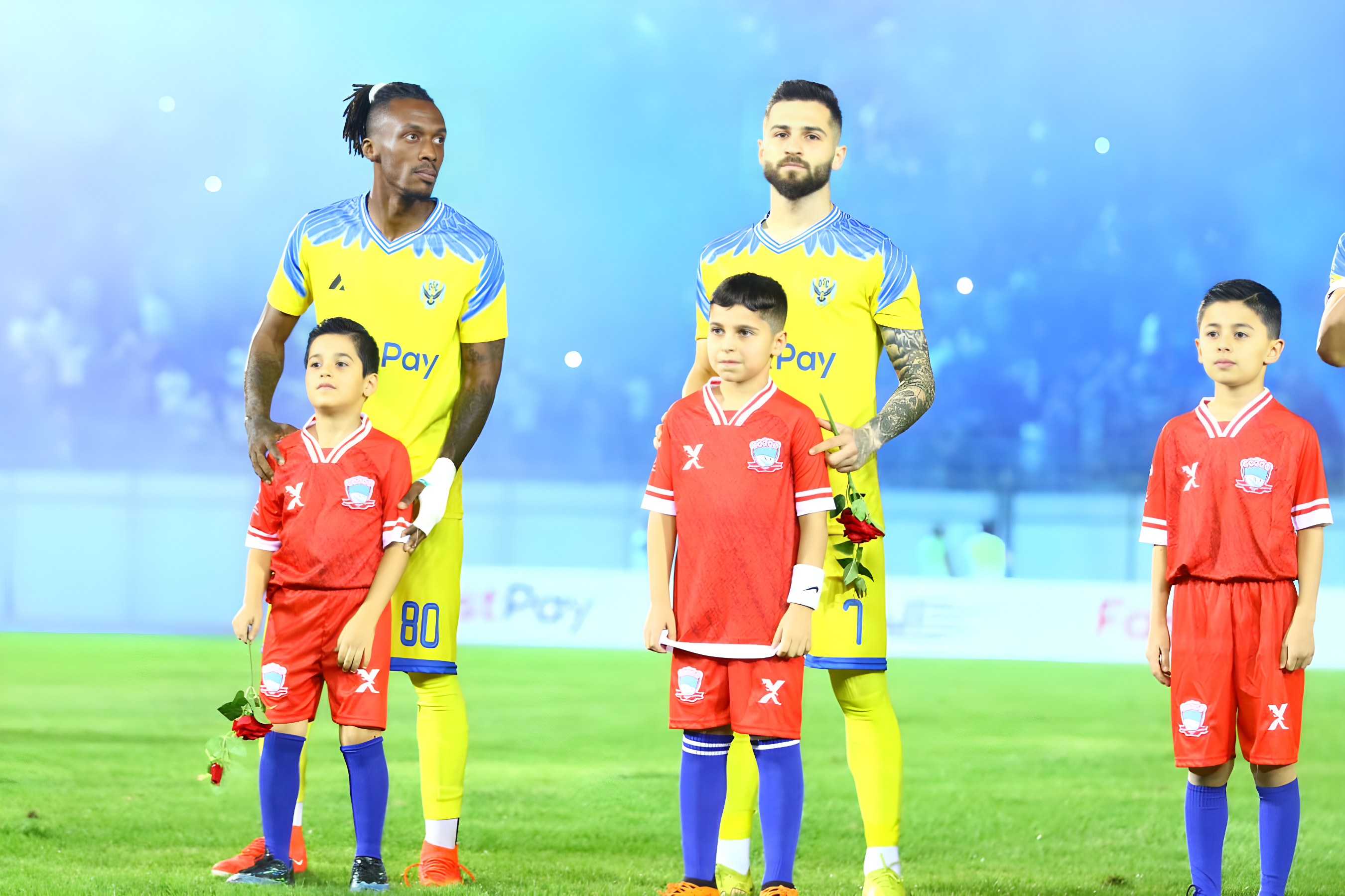
- Yannick Zakri is on the left

Personal information
- Full name: Yannick Zakri Krahiré
- Date of birth: 26 March 1991 (age 35)
- Place of birth: Ouragahio, Ivory Coast
- Height: 1.83 m (6 ft 0 in)
- Position: Forward

Senior career*
Years	Team	Apps	(Gls)
2010–2014	AFAD Djékanou		
2014–2016	ASEC Mimosas		
2016–2018	Mamelodi Sundowns	22	(4)
2018	→ Ajax Cape Town (loan)	10	(4)
2018–2019	Maritzburg United	21	(1)
2019	Naft Al-Wasat		
2020–2022	Al-Faisaly		
2022-2026	Duhok SC	20	(10)

International career^{‡}
2015–2016	Ivory Coast	7	(1)
- * Club domestic league appearances and goals as of 5 January 2026 ‡ National team caps and goals as of 19 May 2023

Yannick Zakri (born 26 March 1991) is an Ivorian footballer who plays as a forward.

== International career ==
=== International goals ===
Scores and results list Ivory Coast's goal tally first.

No	Date	Venue	Opponent	Score	Result	Competition
1.	20 January 2016	Amahoro Stadium, Kigali, Rwanda	Morocco	1–0	1–0	2016 African Nations Championship

== Honours ==
Duhok

- Iraq FA Cup: 2024–25
- AGCFF Gulf Club Champions League: 2024–25
