= Seko Fofana =

Footballer (born 1995)

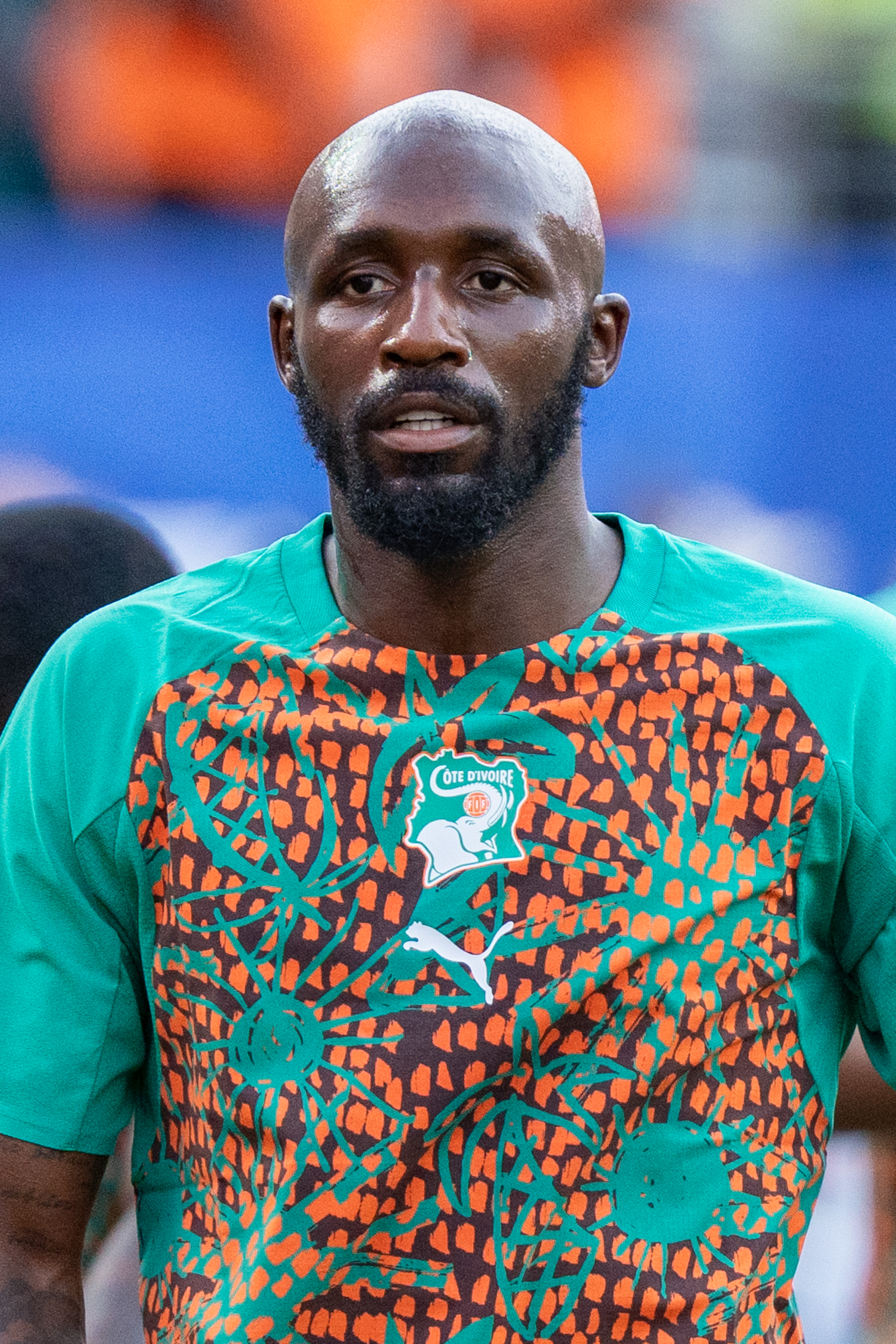
- Fofana with the Ivory Coast in 2026

Personal information
- Full name: Seko Mohamed Fofana
- Date of birth: 7 May 1995 (age 31)
- Place of birth: Paris, France
- Height: 1.85 m (6 ft 1 in)
- Position: Central midfielder

Team information
- Current team: Porto (on loan from Rennes)
- Number: 42

Youth career
- 2004–2010: Paris FC
- 2010–2013: Lorient
- 2013–2014: Manchester City

Senior career*
| Years | Team | Apps | (Gls) |
| 2014–2016 | Manchester City | 0 | (0) |
| 2014–2015 | → Fulham (loan) | 21 | (1) |
| 2015–2016 | → Bastia (loan) | 32 | (1) |
| 2016–2020 | Udinese | 112 | (13) |
| 2020–2023 | Lens | 103 | (17) |
| 2023–2025 | Al-Nassr | 14 | (0) |
| 2024–2025 | → Al-Ettifaq (loan) | 27 | (2) |
| 2025– | Rennes | 28 | (2) |
| 2026– | → Porto (loan) | 15 | (3) |

International career^{‡}
| 2010–2011 | France U16 | 12 | (7) |
| 2011–2012 | France U17 | 11 | (2) |
| 2012–2013 | France U18 | 7 | (2) |
| 2013 | France U19 | 3 | (1) |
| 2017–2026 | Ivory Coast | 35 | (7) |
Medal record
Representing Ivory Coast
Men's football
Africa Cup of Nations
| Winner | 2023 Ivory Coast |
- * Club domestic league appearances and goals as of 20:38, 31 October 2026 (UTC) ‡ National team caps and goals as of 18:40, 14 September 2026 (UTC)

Seko Mohamed Fofana (born 7 May 1995) is a professional footballer who plays as a central midfielder for Primeira Liga club Porto, on loan from Ligue 1 club Rennes. Born in France, he plays for the Ivory Coast national team.

== Club career ==
=== Manchester City ===
Born in Paris, France, Fofana began his youth career at Paris FC when he was nine and stayed there for six years before joining Lorient. After two years at Lorient, he moved to England when he joined Premier League side Manchester City in 2013 and was immediately sent to the development squad.

Fofana began to be a regular in the under-18s in the 2013–14 season, making 20 appearances and scoring 5 goals in the league and playing 7 times scoring twice in the club's UEFA Youth League campaign against CSKA Moscow and Benfica Juniors. During Manchester City's U21 friendly match against HNK Rijeka, he was racially abused by one of the opposition players just before half-time. As a result, players from Manchester City's U21 squad walked off the pitch, prompting the match to be cancelled. After the match, Manager Patrick Vieira praised the action of the players to walk out.

==== Loan to Fulham ====
On 27 November 2014, Fofana signed for Championship side Fulham on loan until 31 January 2015. He made his Fulham debut two days later, where he came on as a substitute for Emerson Hyndman in the 63rd minute, in a 2–1 win over Brighton & Hove Albion. His form and performance convinced Fulham to extend the loan spell until the end of the season. He scored his first goal for the club on 21 March 2015 to secure a 2–0 win away to Huddersfield Town. Having established himself under the management of Kit Symons, Fofana went on to make 25 appearances scoring once before returning to his parent club.

==== Loan to Bastia ====
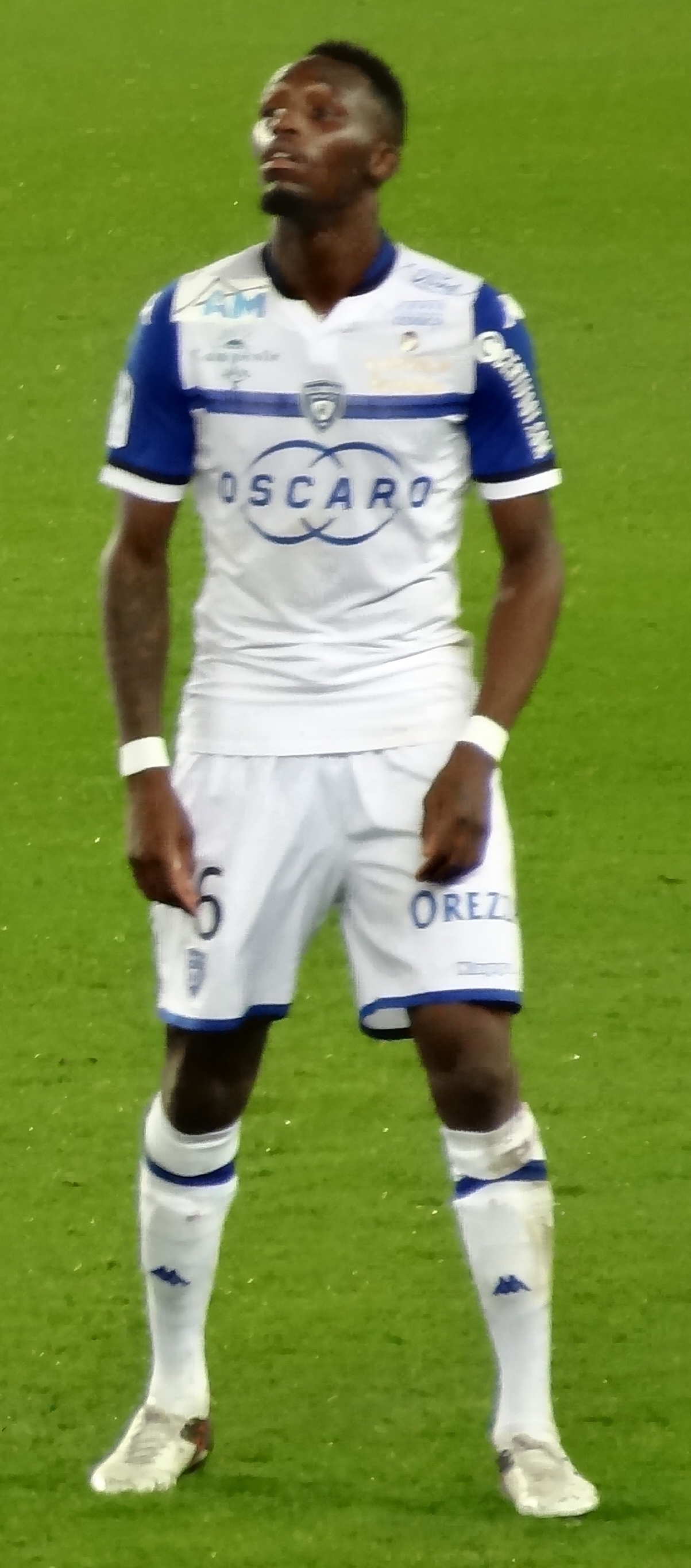
Fofana with Bastia in 2016

After making two appearances for City during their pre-season tour in Australia (playing the second half of a 2–0 win over Adelaide United, and coming on as a late substitute in Manchester City's 1–0 win over Melbourne City), the Premier League club agreed to send Fofana out on loan again to gain further experience. The Frenchman subsequently returned to his native France, to join Bastia on a season-long loan on 29 July 2015.

He made his Ligue 1 debut in the opening game of the season 10 days later, on 8 August 2015, playing the full 90 minutes in a 2−1 win at home to Rennes. He then scored his first goal on 12 December 2015, in a 1–1 draw against Troyes, followed up by assisting in the next game on 19 December 2015, in a 2–0 win over Reims.

In a 1–0 win over Montpellier on 16 January 2016, Fofana received a straight red card in the 65th minutes. After the match, he was given a four match ban and Fofana, himself, apologised for his action. In total, he made 32 appearances and scoring once for Bastia.

=== Udinese ===
After three years at Manchester City, Fofana joined Serie A side Udinese, signing a five-year deal for worth £2.5 million. In addition, the move included a possible €2 million bonus and Bastia receiving 15% of the total compensation, up to €700K. Fofana made his Udinese debut in the opening game of the season playing 79 minutes before being substituted, in a 4–0 loss against Roma.

=== Lens ===
On 18 August 2020, Fofana signed a four-year contract with Ligue 1 club Lens. He scored his first goal on 21 February 2021 against Dijon. After a string of good performances, he was awarded the Ligue 1 Player of the Month for September 2021. In May 2022, Fofana won the Prix Marc-Vivien Foé as the best African player in France's top flight for the 2021–22 campaign, following a season in which he scored eight goals in 37 appearances. On 31 August 2022, he signed a contract extension with the club until 2025.

=== Al-Nassr ===
On 18 July 2023, Fofana joined Saudi Pro League club Al Nassr on a three-year deal, reportedly for a fee of €25 million.

==== Loan to Al-Ettifaq ====
On 30 January 2024, Fofana joined fellow Saudi Arabian side Al-Ettifaq on a six-month loan. On 17 August 2024, Fofana re-joined Al-Ettifaq on a one-year loan.

=== Rennes ===
On 1 January 2025, Fofana returned to Ligue 1 and joined Rennes on a four-and-a-half years contract. The transfer was completed for a fee of €20 million, establishing him as the most expensive sale in the history of the Saudi Pro League.

==== Loan to Porto ====
On 2 February 2026, Fofana was sent on loan to Primeira Liga club Porto until the end of the 2025–26 season. On 26 August 2026, Porto prolongated the loan agreement until the end of the 2026–27 season.

== International career ==
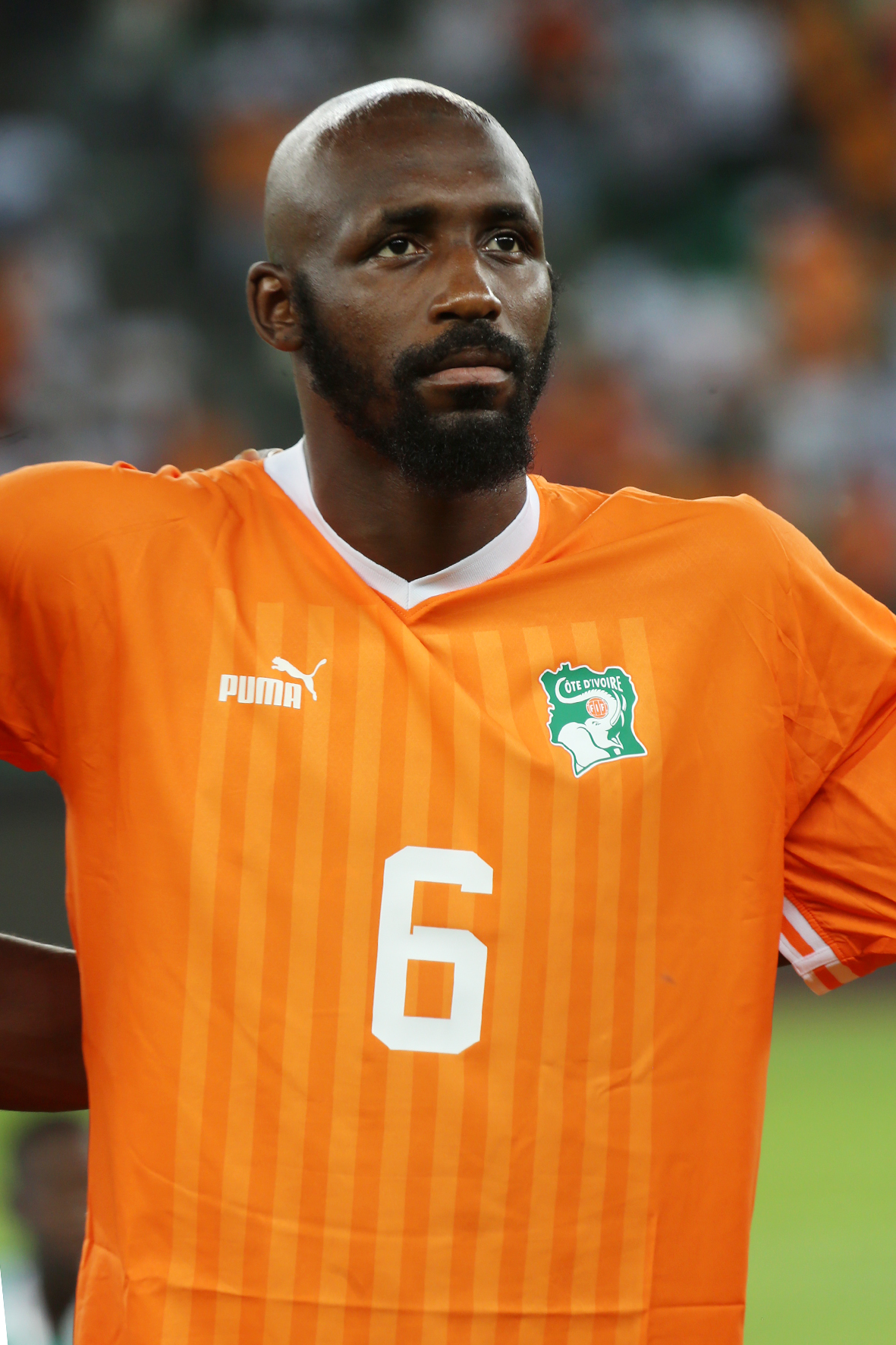
Fofana with Ivory Coast at the 2023 Africa Cup of Nations

Fofana was eligible to play for France and Ivory Coast, as his parents come from there. Fofana previously represented France U16, France U17, France U18 and France U19. On 3 April 2017, Fofana chose to represent the Ivory Coast, the country of his parents.

Fofana made his debut for Ivory Coast in a 2–0 2018 FIFA World Cup qualification loss to Morocco on 11 November 2017.

In December 2023, Fofana was named in the Ivory Coast's squad for the 2023 Africa Cup of Nations. He scored the opening goal of the tournament four minutes into Ivory Coast's 2–0 win over Guinea-Bissau on 13 January 2024.

Fofana was included in the list of Ivorian players selected by coach Emerse Faé to participate in the 2025 Africa Cup of Nations.

On May 15, 2026, Fofana was integrated by Ivory Coast coach Emerse Faé in his list of 26 players in order to participate in the 2026 World Cup.

== Career statistics ==
=== Club ===
As of match played 20 November 2026

Appearances and goals by club, season and competition
| Club | Season | League | | | National cup (Note: Includes FA Cup, Coupe de France, Coppa Italia, King's Cup, Taça de Portugal) | | Continental | | Other | | Total | |
| Club | Season | Division | Apps | Goals | Apps | Goals | Apps | Goals | Apps | Goals | Apps | Goals |
|---|---|---|---|---|---|---|---|---|---|---|---|---|
| Fulham (loan) | 2014–15 | Championship | 21 | 1 | 4 | 0 | — | | — | | 25 | 1 |
| Bastia (loan) | 2015–16 | Ligue 1 | 32 | 1 | 1 | 0 | — | | — | | 33 | 1 |
| Udinese | 2016–17 | Serie A | 22 | 5 | 1 | 0 | — | | — | | 23 | 5 |
| Udinese | 2017–18 | Serie A | 27 | 3 | 2 | 0 | — | | — | | 29 | 3 |
| Udinese | 2018–19 | Serie A | 31 | 2 | 1 | 0 | — | | — | | 32 | 2 |
| Udinese | 2019–20 | Serie A | 32 | 3 | 3 | 0 | — | | — | | 35 | 3 |
| Udinese | Total | | 112 | 13 | 7 | 0 | — | | — | | 177 | 15 |
| Lens | 2020–21 | Ligue 1 | 30 | 2 | 2 | 0 | — | | — | | 32 | 2 |
| Lens | 2021–22 | Ligue 1 | 38 | 8 | 3 | 2 | — | | — | | 41 | 10 |
| Lens | 2022–23 | Ligue 1 | 35 | 7 | 4 | 2 | — | | — | | 39 | 9 |
| Lens | Total | | 103 | 17 | 9 | 4 | — | | — | | 112 | 21 |
| Al-Nassr | 2023–24 | Saudi Pro League | 14 | 0 | 3 | 2 | 2 (Note: Appearances in AFC Champions League) | 0 | 6 (Note: Appearances in Arab Club Champions Cup) | 1 | 25 | 3 |
| Al-Ettifaq (loan) | 2023–24 | Saudi Pro League | 14 | 2 | — | | — | | — | | 14 | 2 |
| Al-Ettifaq (loan) | 2024–25 | Saudi Pro League | 13 | 0 | 2 | 0 | — | | 4 (Note: Appearances in AGCFF Gulf Club Champions League) | 1 | 19 | 1 |
| Al-Ettifaq (loan) | Total | | 27 | 2 | 2 | 0 | — | | 4 | 1 | 33 | 3 |
| Rennes | 2024–25 | Ligue 1 | 16 | 1 | 1 | 0 | — | | — | | 17 | 1 |
| Rennes | 2025–26 | Ligue 1 | 12 | 1 | 0 | 0 | — | | — | | 12 | 1 |
| Rennes | Total | | 28 | 2 | 1 | 0 | — | | — | | 29 | 2 |
| Porto (loan) | 2025–26 | Primeira Liga | 12 | 3 | 2 | 0 | 4 (Note: Appearances in UEFA Europa League) | 0 | — | | 18 | 3 |
| Porto (loan) | 2026–27 | Primeira Liga | 3 | 0 | 1 | 1 | 3 (Note: Appearances in UEFA Champions League) | 0 | 1 (Note: Appearance in Taça da Liga) | 0 | 8 | 1 |
| Porto (loan) | Total | | 15 | 3 | 3 | 1 | 7 | 0 | 1 | 0 | 26 | 4 |
| Career total | | | 352 | 39 | 30 | 6 | 9 | 0 | 11 | 2 | 402 | 48 |

=== International ===
As of match played 20 June 2026

Appearances and goals by national team and year
| National team | Year | Apps | Goals |
|---|---|---|---|
| Ivory Coast | 2017 | 1 | 0 |
| Ivory Coast | 2018 | 0 | 0 |
| Ivory Coast | 2019 | 5 | 1 |
| Ivory Coast | 2020 | 0 | 0 |
| Ivory Coast | 2021 | 0 | 0 |
| Ivory Coast | 2022 | 2 | 2 |
| Ivory Coast | 2023 | 4 | 2 |
| Ivory Coast | 2024 | 13 | 2 |
| Ivory Coast | 2025 | 4 | 0 |
| Ivory Coast | 2026 | 6 | 0 |
| Total | | 35 | 7 |

Scores and results list Ivory Coast's goal tally first, score column indicates score after each Fofana goal.

List of international goals scored by Seko Fofana
| No. | Date | Venue | Opponent | Score | Result | Competition | Ref. |
|---|---|---|---|---|---|---|---|
| 1 | 10 September 2019 | Stade Robert Diochon, Rouen, France | Tunisia | 2–0 | 2–1 | Friendly | |
| 2 | 24 September 2022 | Stade Robert Diochon, Rouen, France | Togo | 1–0 | 2–1 | Friendly | |
| 3 | 27 September 2022 | Stade de la Licorne, Amiens, France | Guinea | 3–0 | 3–1 | Friendly | |
| 4 | 17 November 2023 | Alassane Ouattara Stadium, Abidjan, Ivory Coast | Seychelles | 5–0 | 9–0 | 2026 FIFA World Cup qualification | |
| 5 | 20 November 2023 | National Stadium, Dar es Salaam, Tanzania | Gambia | 2–0 | 2–0 | 2026 FIFA World Cup qualification | |
| 6 | 13 January 2024 | Alassane Ouattara Stadium, Abidjan, Ivory Coast | Guinea-Bissau | 1–0 | 2–0 | 2023 Africa Cup of Nations | |
| 7 | 7 June 2024 | Amadou Gon Coulibaly Stadium, Korhogo, Ivory Coast | Gabon | 1–0 | 1–0 | 2026 FIFA World Cup qualification | |

== Honours ==
Al-Nassr

- Arab Club Champions Cup: 2023

Porto

- Primeira Liga: 2025–26

Ivory Coast

- Africa Cup of Nations: 2023

Individual

- Prix Marc-Vivien Foé: 2021–22
- UNFP Ligue 1 Team of the Year: 2021–22, 2022–23
- UNFP Ligue 1 Player of the Month: September 2021
