= Thamer Al-Khaibari =

Saudi Arabian footballer (born 2005)

Personal information
- Full name: Thamer Fathi Mustafa Al-Dakheel Al-Khaibari
- Date of birth: 3 December 2005 (age 20)
- Place of birth: Jeddah, Saudi Arabia
- Height: 1.87 m (6 ft 2 in)
- Position: Forward

Team information
- Current team: Al-Khaleej (on loan from Neom)
- Number: 90

Youth career
- –2023: Al-Ittihad

Senior career*
Years	Team	Apps	(Gls)
2023–2025	Al-Ettifaq	7	(0)
2024–2025	→ Al-Raed (loan)	21	(0)
2025–	Neom	3	(0)
2026–	→ Al-Khaleej (loan)	6	(1)

International career
2024–	Saudi Arabia U20	15	(6)
- * Club domestic league appearances and goals as of 23 October 2026

Thamer Al-Khaibari (Arabic: ثامر الخيبري; born 3 December 2005) is a Saudi Arabian football player who plays as a forward for Al-Khaleej, on loan from Neom and the Saudi Arabia U20.

== Club career ==
Al-Khaibari started his career at the youth teams of Al-Ittihad. On 8 September 2023, he moved to Al-Ettifaq on a free transfer. On 4 September 2024, Al-Khaibari joined side Al-Raed on a one-year loan. On 17 July 2025, Al-Khaibari joined side Neom. On 2 February 2026, Al-Khaibari joined side Al-Khaleej on a sex-month loan.
