= Nawaf Hazazi =

Saudi Arabian footballer

Nawaf Hazazi نواف هزازي
Personal information
- Full name: Nawaf Hazazi
- Date of birth: 11 January 2002 (age 24)
- Place of birth: Saudi Arabia
- Height: 1.68 m (5 ft 6 in)
- Position: Midfielder

Team information
- Current team: Al-Jubail (on loan from Al-Ettifaq)
- Number: 77

Youth career
- –2022: Al-Ettifaq

Senior career*
Years	Team	Apps	(Gls)
2022–	Al-Ettifaq	4	(0)
2023–2024	→ Al-Bukiryah (loan)	0	(0)
2024–2025	→ Al-Sahel (loan)		
2025–	→ Al-Jubail (loan)		
- * Club domestic league appearances and goals as of 15 July 2023

Nawaf Hazazi (Arabic: نواف هزازي; born 11 January 2002) is a Saudi Arabian professional footballer who plays as a midfielder for Al-Jubail, on loan from Al-Ettifaq.

== Club career ==
Hazazi began his career at the youth team of Al-Ettifaq. On 29 October 2020, he signed his first professional contract with the club. He made his debut on 9 September 2022 in the league match against Al-Batin, replacing Hamed Al-Ghamdi in the 13th minute. On 9 September 2023, Hazazi joined Al-Bukiryah on a one-year loan. In September 2024, Hazazi joined Al-Sahel on a one-year loan. On 8 September 2025, Hazazi joined Al-Jubail on loan.

== Career statistics ==
=== Club ===
As of 15 July 2023

Club	Season	League		King Cup		Asia		Other		Total	
Club	Season	Apps	Goals	Apps	Goals	Apps	Goals	Apps	Goals	Apps	Goals
Al-Ettifaq	2022–23	4	0	0	0	—		—		4	0
Al-Ettifaq	Total	4	0	0	0	0	0	0	0	4	0
Career totals		4	0	0	0	0	0	0	0	4	0
