= Vitinho (footballer, born October 1993) =

Brazilian footballer

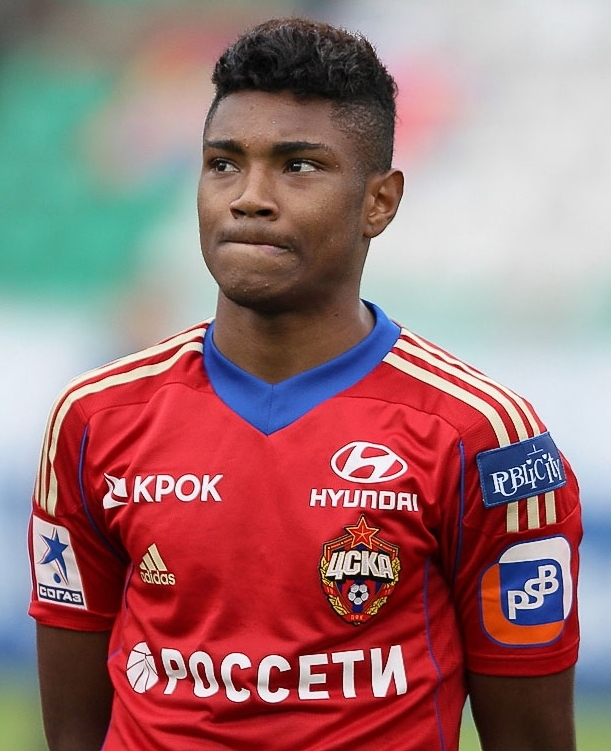
- Vitinho with CSKA Moscow in 2013

Personal information
- Full name: Victor Vinícius Coelho dos Santos
- Date of birth: 9 October 1993 (age 33)
- Place of birth: Rio de Janeiro, Brazil
- Height: 1.80 m (5 ft 11 in)
- Positions: Striker; attacking midfielder

Team information
- Current team: Corinthians
- Number: 11

Youth career
- 2007–2010: Audax Rio
- 2011–2012: Botafogo

Senior career*
Years	Team	Apps	(Gls)
2011–2013	Botafogo	33	(10)
2013–2018	CSKA Moscow	58	(16)
2015–2016	→ Internacional (loan)	83	(25)
2018–2022	Flamengo	133	(21)
2022–2025	Al-Ettifaq	62	(11)
2024	→ Al-Shabab (loan)	8	(1)
2025–	Corinthians	36	(1)

International career
2012	Brazil U23	4	(2)
- * Club domestic league appearances and goals as of 22:05, 18 November 2025 (UTC)

Victor Vinícius Coelho dos Santos (born 9 October 1993), commonly known as Vitinho, is a Brazilian footballer who plays as a striker and attacking midfielder for Corinthians in the Campeonato Brasileiro Série A.

== Club career ==
=== Botafogo ===
During the 2013 season, he scored 4 goals in 16 Campeonato Brasileiro Série A matches.

=== CSKA Moscow ===
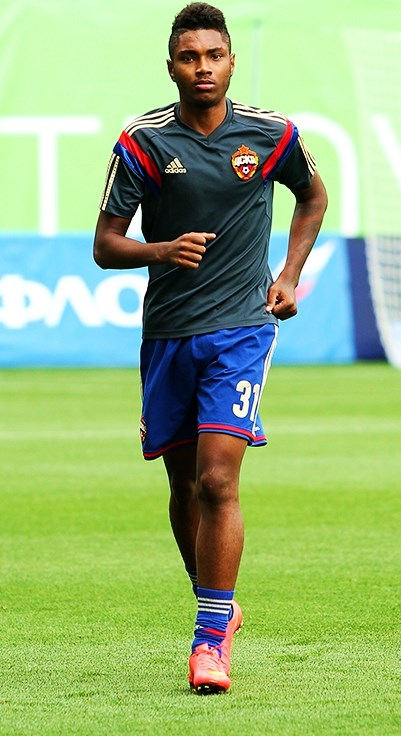
Vitinho training with CSKA.

On 2 September 2013, Vitinho signed a 5-year contract with Russian Premier League Champions CSKA Moscow. However, Vitinho struggled to be in the regular first team and instead, he made a handful appearances from the bench and often remained an unused substitute. Vitinho was linked with a loan move to Botafogo.

==== Internacional (loan) ====
On 16 January 2015 Vitinho joined Internacional on a one-year loan deal. The loan was extended until the end of 2016 on 24 December 2015. At the same time Vitinho extended his CSKA contract until the summer of 2020. CSKA had an option to recall him from loan in the summer of 2016, but they did not. At the end of his loan, CSKA announced they will not extend the loan and Vitinho will return to CSKA for the start of their camp in January 2017.

=== Flamengo ===
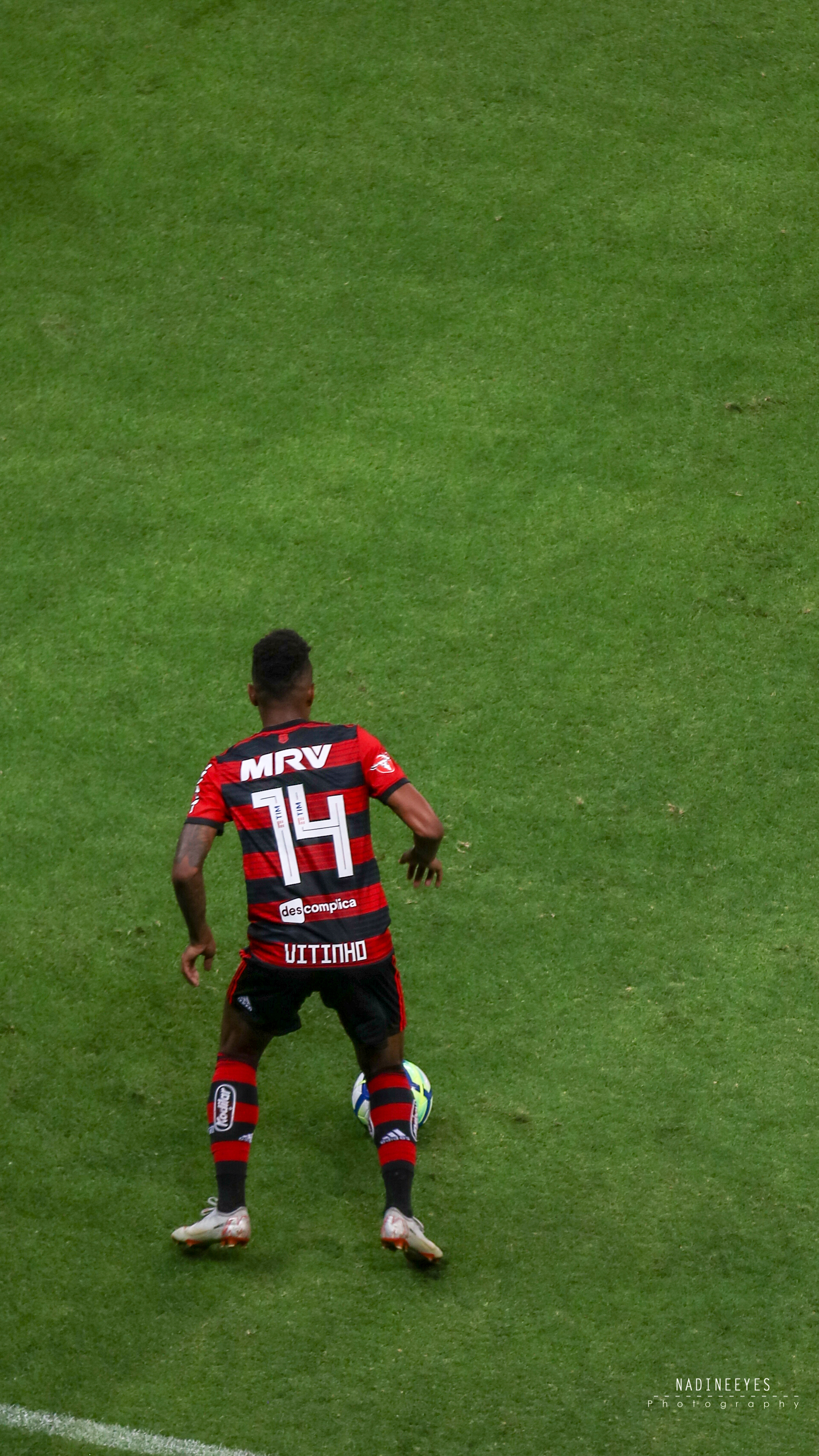
Vitinho with Flamengo in 2018.

Following the 2018 Russian Super Cup game that CSKA won on 27 July 2018, the club announced that this was Vitinho's last game for them as they agreed on his transfer with Flamengo. Both clubs agreed in a €10 million transfer fee, so Vitinho became the highest transfer in Flamengo's history.

On 4 August 2018 Vitinho debuted for Flamengo in a league match against Grêmio at Arena do Grêmio, Flamengo lost 2–0. He scored his first goal for his new club on 5 September 2018 in a Brazilian Série A 2–1 loss to Internacional at Estádio Beira-Rio. He finished 2018 season with a total of 28 appearances and 3 goals for Flamengo.

=== Al-Shabab ===
On 30 January 2024, Vitinho joined Al-Shabab on a six-month loan from Al-Ettifaq.

== Career statistics ==
=== Club ===
As of 18 November 2026

Appearances and goals by club, season and competition
Club	Season	League			State League		Cup		Continental		Other		Total	
Club	Season	Division	Apps	Goals	Apps	Goals	Apps	Goals	Apps	Goals	Apps	Goals	Apps	Goals
Botafogo	2011	Série A	0	0	1 (Note: Appearance(s) in Campeonato Carioca)	1	0	0	0	0	—		1	1
Botafogo	2012	Série A	0	0	1	0	1	0	0	0	—		2	0
Botafogo	2013	Série A	16	4	15	5	7	1	—		—		38	10
Botafogo	Total		16	4	17	6	8	1	0	0	—		41	11
CSKA Moscow	2013–14	Russian Premier League	10	0	—		3	0	5 (Note: Appearance(s) in UEFA Champions League)	0	—		18	0
CSKA Moscow	2014–15	Russian Premier League	5	1	—		0	0	0	0	1 (Note: Appearance(s) in Russian Super Cup)	0	6	1
CSKA Moscow	2016–17	Russian Premier League	13	5	—		0	0	0	0	0	0	13	5
CSKA Moscow	2017–18	Russian Premier League	30	10	—		0	0	16 (Note: Ten appearances and two goals in UEFA Champions League, six appearances in UEFA Europa League)	2	0	0	46	12
CSKA Moscow	2018–19	Russian Premier League	0	0	—		0	0	0	0	1	0	1	0
CSKA Moscow	Total		58	16	—		3	0	21	2	2	0	84	18
Internacional (loan)	2015	Série A	33	11	9 (Note: Appearance(s) in Campeonato Gaúcho)	2	3	1	4 (Note: Appearance(s) Copa Libertadores)	1	—		49	15
Internacional (loan)	2016	Série A	28	8	13	4	1	0	—		3 (Note: Appearance(s) in Primeira Liga)	2	45	14
Internacional (loan)	Total		61	19	22	6	4	1	4	1	3	2	94	29
Flamengo	2018	Série A	22	3	—		4	0	2	0	—		28	3
Flamengo	2019	Série A	25	5	13	3	4	0	8	1	2 (Note: Appearance(s) in FIFA Club World Cup)	0	52	9
Flamengo	2020	Série A	29	2	10	1	3	0	5	0	2 (Note: Appearance(s) in Recopa Sudamericana)	0	49	3
Flamengo	2021	Série A	31	4	12	5	8	2	11	3	1 (Note: Appearance(s) in Supercopa do Brasil)	0	63	14
Flamengo	2022	Série A	11	0	9	0	0	0	0	0	1	0	21	0
Flamengo	Total		118	14	44	9	19	2	26	4	6	0	213	29
Al-Ettifaq	2022–23	Saudi Pro League	27	3	—		1	0	0	0	—		28	3
Al-Ettifaq	2023–24	Saudi Pro League	4	2	—		0	0	—		—		4	2
Al-Ettifaq	2024–25	Saudi Pro League	31	6	—		2	1	—		0	0	33	7
Al-Ettifaq	Total		62	11	—		3	1	0	0	0	0	65	12
Al Shabab (loan)	2023–24	Saudi Pro League	8	1	—		0	0	0	0	—		8	1
Corinthians	2025	Série A	12	0	—		5	0	—		0	0	17	0
Corinthians	2026	Série A	14	0	10	1	1	0	2 (Note: Appearances in Copa Libertadores)	0	0	0	27	1
Corinthians	Total		26	0	10	1	6	0	2	0	0	0	44	1
Career total			349	65	93	22	43	5	53	7	11	2	549	101

== Honours ==
Botafogo

- Campeonato Carioca: 2013

CSKA

- Russian Premier League: 2013–14
- Russian Super Cup: 2014, 2018

Internacional

- Campeonato Gaúcho: 2015, 2016

Flamengo

- Copa Libertadores: 2019
- Recopa Sudamericana: 2020
- Campeonato Brasileiro Série A: 2019, 2020
- Supercopa do Brasil: 2020, 2021
- Campeonato Carioca: 2019, 2020, 2021
- FIFA Club World Cup runner-up: 2019

Corinthians

- Copa do Brasil: 2025
- Supercopa do Brasil: 2026
