= Majed Dawran =

Saudi Arabian footballer (born 2003)

Personal information
- Full name: Majed Mohammed Yazid Dawran
- Date of birth: 16 August 2003 (age 23)
- Height: 1.84 m (6 ft 0 in)
- Position: Central midfielder

Team information
- Current team: Al-Najma (on loan from Al-Ettifaq)
- Number: 11

Youth career
- –2024: Al-Ettifaq

Senior career*
Years	Team	Apps	(Gls)
2024–	Al-Ettifaq	27	(1)
2026–	→ Al-Najma (loan)	0	(0)

International career
2024–2025	Saudi Arabia U23	3	(0)
- * Club domestic league appearances and goals

Majed Dawran (Arabic: ماجد دوران; born 16 August 2003) is a Saudi Arabian professional football player who plays as a central midfielder for Pro League side Al-Najma, on loan from Al-Ettifaq and former played the Saudi Arabia U23.

== Club career ==
Dawran started his career at the youth teams of Al-Ettifaq. He reached the first team in the 2023–2024 season. On 30 July 2024, signed his first professional contract with the club for five-years deal. On 31 January 2026, Dawran joined Al-Najma on a six-month loan.

== International career ==
He was called up several times to the Saudi Arabia U23 camps.
