= Josen Escobar =

Colombian footballer (born 2004)

Personal information
- Full name: Josen David Escobar del Duca
- Date of birth: 12 December 2004 (age 21)
- Place of birth: Santa Marta, Colombia
- Position: Defensive midfielder

Team information
- Current team: América de Cali
- Number: 36

Youth career
- América de Cali

Senior career*
Years	Team	Apps	(Gls)
2023–	América de Cali	69	(2)
2025	→ Al-Ettifaq (loan)	8	(0)

International career^{‡}
2024–	Colombia U23	3	(0)
- * Club domestic league appearances and goals as of 11 December 2025 ‡ National team caps and goals as of 2 February 2024

Josen David Escobar del Duca (born 12 December 2004) is a Colombian professional footballer who plays as a defensive midfielder for América de Cali.

== Club career ==
Born in Santa Marta, Escobar started his career with América de Cali. He made his professional debut with América de Cali in a 0–0 Categoría Primera A draw with Unión Magdalena on 30 August 2024.

On 16 January 2025, Escobar joined Saudi Pro League club Al-Ettifaq on a six-month loan.

== International career ==
Josen Escobar has represented Colombia at under-23 level.
