= Jean Fuentes =

Venezuelan footballer (born 1997)

Personal information
- Full name: Jean Franco Alexi Fuentes Velasco
- Date of birth: 7 February 1997 (age 29)
- Place of birth: Caracas, Venezuela
- Height: 1.88 m (6 ft 2 in)
- Position: Defender

Team information
- Current team: Carabobo

Senior career*
Years	Team	Apps	(Gls)
2016	Estudiantes Caracas	3	(1)
2016	Deportivo Anzoátegui	0	(0)
2017–2018	Estudiantes Caracas	26	(2)
2019–2020	Deportivo La Guaira	31	(2)
2021	→ La Equidad (loan)	12	(0)
2022	Metropolitanos	30	(2)
2023	→ Aguilas Doradas (loan)	12	(0)
2023	Metropolitanos	18	(2)
2024-2025	Al-Riffa SC	10	(0)
2025-	Carabobo	0	(0)

International career^{‡}
2018	Venezuela U21	3	(0)
2023-	Venezuela	2	(0)
- * Club domestic league appearances and goals as of 00:56, 17 March 2021 (UTC). ‡ National team caps and goals as of 20:11, 11 January 2020 (UTC)

Jean Franco Alexi Fuentes Velasco (born 7 February 1997) is a Venezuelan footballer who plays as a defender for Carabobo.

== Career statistics ==
=== Club ===
As of 11 January 2020.

Club	Season	League			Cup		Continental		Other		Total	
Club	Season	Division	Apps	Goals	Apps	Goals	Apps	Goals	Apps	Goals	Apps	Goals
Estudiantes Caracas	2016	Venezuelan Primera División	3	1	0	0	0	0	0	0	3	1
Deportivo Anzoátegui	2016	Venezuelan Primera División	0	0	0	0	0	0	0	0	0	0
Estudiantes Caracas	2017	Venezuelan Primera División	0	0	5 (Note: Appearances in the Copa Venezuela)	2	2 (Note: Appearances in the Copa Sudamericana)	0	0	0	7	2
Estudiantes Caracas	2018	Venezuelan Primera División	26	2	0	0	0	0	0	0	26	2
Estudiantes Caracas	Total		26	2	5	2	2	0	0	0	33	4
Deportivo La Guaira	2019	Venezuelan Primera División	21	2	1	0	0	0	0	0	22	2
Career total			50	5	6	2	2	0	0	0	58	7
