= João Costa (footballer, born 28 March 2005) =

Portuguese footballer

Personal information
- Full name: João Gabriel e Costa Cesco
- Date of birth: 28 March 2005 (age 21)
- Place of birth: Umuarama, Brazil
- Height: 1.78 m (5 ft 10 in)
- Position: Winger

Team information
- Current team: Cruzeiro (on loan from Al-Ettifaq)
- Number: 67

Youth career
- 2017–2019: Palmeiras
- 2019–2021: Corinthians
- 2021–2024: Roma

Senior career*
Years	Team	Apps	(Gls)
2023–2024	Roma	3	(0)
2024–	Al-Ettifaq	24	(4)
2026–	→ Cruzeiro (loan)	0	(0)

International career^{‡}
2023	Portugal U19	3	(0)
2024	Brazil U20	1	(0)
2024	Portugal U20	2	(0)
2026–	Portugal U21	1	(0)
- * Club domestic league appearances and goals as of 22:33, 11 April 2025 (UTC) ‡ National team caps and goals as of 3 June 2026

João Gabriel e Costa Cesco (born 28 March 2005) is a professional footballer who plays as a winger for Cruzeiro, on loan from Al-Ettifaq. Born in Brazil, he is a youth international for Portugal.

== Club career ==
=== Roma ===
Costa is a youth product of Brazilian clubs Palmeiras and Corinthians, before moving to Italy to join Roma in September 2021. On 5 May 2023, he signed his first professional contract with Roma, valid until 2026. On 30 September 2023, he was promoted to the senior Roma squad for Serie A matches. He made his senior debut for Roma as a substitute in a 2–0 UEFA Europa League loss to Sparta Prague on 9 November 2023. He scored his first goal for the team in a friendly match against Al-Shabab, contributing to the team's victory.

=== Al-Ettifaq ===
On 2 September 2024, Costa joined Saudi Arabian club Al-Ettifaq.

== International career ==
Born in Brazil, Costa holds dual Brazilian-Portuguese citizenship. In October 2023, he played for the Portugal U19s in a set of friendlies. In May 2024 he was called up to the Brazil U20s. He was capped by the Portugal U20s shortly after in November 2024.

== Personal life ==
Costa is the brother of the Brazilian footballer João Cesco.
