= Al-Ettifaq Club Stadium =

Multi-purpose stadium in Riyadh, Saudi Arabia

Al-Ettifaq Club Stadium ملعب نادي الإتفاق
- Interactive map of Al-Ettifaq Club Stadium ملعب نادي الإتفاق
- Full name: EGO STADIUM
- Former names: Abdullah Al-Dabal Stadium (1983–2023)
- Location: Dammam, Saudi Arabia
- Coordinates: 26°21′2.056″N 50°10′52.114″E
- Owner: Ministry of Sport
- Operator: Al-Ettifaq Club Management
- Capacity: 12,924
- Surface: Grass
- Record attendance: 12,356 (Al-Ettifaq vs Al-Raed, 4 November 2023)

Construction
- Opened: 1983
- Renovated: 2021–2023
- Cost: 90 million

Tenant
- Al-Ettifaq (2023–present)

Al-Ettifaq Club Stadium, also known as EGO STADIUM for sponsorship reasons, is a football stadium in Dammam, Saudi Arabia, It is the home stadium of Al-Ettifaq.

== History ==
The stadium was originally built and opened in 1983, and was primarily used by Al-Ettifaq as a training ground and for friendly matches. It also served as the home stadium for their youth teams. The original design featured an athletics track and two side stands, with a total capacity of 7,500 spectators. It was named after Abdullah Al-Dabal, former president of Al-Ettifaq and a prominent football official who was also a member of the FIFA Executive Committee.

On 10 June 2021, the Ministry of Sport announced plans to renovate three smaller stadiums: Abdullah Al-Dabal Stadium, Al-Shabab, and Al-Fateh. A month later, on 10 July 2021, it was announced that Abdullah Al-Dabal Stadium would be closed for six months to undergo major renovations.

The redevelopment plan involved removing the athletics track and reconfiguring the stands into a more football-oriented layout. New stands were built behind the goals and covered with roofing, while the stadium's capacity increased to 15,000 spectators. However, construction extended beyond the original timeline, with completion announced for January 2023.

On 13 September 2023, the stadium officially reopened under the new name Al-Ettifaq Club Stadium.

The first league match at the renovated venue was held on 4 November 2023, with Al-Ettifaq facing Al-Raed. The game ended in a 0–0 draw in front of 12,356 spectators. Later, on 24 November 2023, Georginio Wijnaldum scored the stadium's first official goal in a 1–1 draw against Al-Ittihad.

On 31 October 2024, the stadium's naming rights were sold to EGO, a local delivery app. As part of the agreement, the stadium was officially renamed EGO Stadium, with the sponsorship deal set to run until 2026.

The stadium is located just a few streets away from province rivals Al-Qadsiah's Aramco Stadium.

== See also ==
- List of football stadiums in Saudi Arabia
