= 2023–24 Al-Hazem F.C. season =

Al-Hazem
2023–24 season
- President: Salman Al-Malik
- Manager: Filipe Gouveia (until 20 October); José Daniel Carreño (from 20 October until 19 April); Saleh Al-Mohammadi (from 19 April)
- Stadium: Al-Hazem Club Stadium
- SPL: 18th (relegated)
- King Cup: Round of 16 (knocked out by Al-Hilal)
- Top goalscorer: League: Tozé (9 goals); All: Tozé; Faïz Selemani (9 goals each)
- Highest home attendance: 12,297 (vs. Al-Nassr, 2 September 2023)
- Lowest home attendance: 117 (vs. Abha, 27 May 2024)
- Average home league attendance: 1,671

The 2023–24 season was Al-Hazem's 67th year in their existence and the first season back in the top flight of Saudi Arabian football after earning promotion the previous season. The club participated in the Pro League and the King Cup.

The season covers the period from 1 July 2023 to 30 June 2024.

== Players ==
=== Squad information ===
As of 1 February 2024

Note: Flags indicate national team as defined under FIFA eligibility rules; some limited exceptions apply. Players may hold more than one non-FIFA nationality.

| No. | Pos. | Nation | Player |
|---|---|---|---|
| 2 | DF | BRA | Paulo Ricardo |
| 3 | DF | KSA | Talal Al-Absi |
| 6 | MF | KSA | Basil Al-Sayyali |
| 7 | MF | KSA | Yousef Al-Shammari |
| 9 | FW | KSA | Nawaf Al-Beshri |
| 10 | MF | COM | Faïz Selemani |
| 11 | FW | KSA | Mohammed Al-Thani |
| 12 | DF | KSA | Farhan Al-Aazmi |
| 13 | DF | KSA | Yazeed Al-Bakr |
| 15 | MF | KSA | Ammar Al-Najjar |
| 16 | MF | KSA | Ahmed Al-Juwaid |
| 17 | MF | KSA | Sultan Al-Eisa |
| 18 | MF | KSA | Azzam Al-Salman |
| 19 | FW | KSA | Nawaf Al-Habashi |
| 20 | MF | POR | Tozé |
| 22 | DF | KSA | Fahad Al-Obaid |
| 23 | GK | KSA | Ibrahim Zaid |

| No. | Pos. | Nation | Player |
|---|---|---|---|
| 25 | DF | KSA | Ahmed Asiri |
| 27 | DF | KSA | Majed Qasheesh (on loan from Al-Nassr) |
| 29 | MF | BRA | Vina |
| 30 | GK | TUN | Aymen Dahmen |
| 33 | GK | KSA | Majed Al-Ghamdi |
| 34 | DF | KSA | Abdulrahman Al-Dakheel |
| 36 | DF | BRA | Bruno Viana (on loan from Coritiba) |
| 55 | DF | KSA | Mohammed Al-Shaeri |
| 78 | MF | KSA | Hassan Bandar |
| 82 | DF | KSA | Abdulaziz Al-Harbi |
| 85 | MF | KSA | Rayan Al-Sharekh |
| 88 | MF | KSA | Mohammed Abousaban |
| 90 | FW | GAM | Muhammed Badamosi (on loan from Čukarički) |
| 93 | MF | VEN | Júnior Moreno |
| 94 | FW | KSA | Omar Al-Ruwaili |
| 95 | MF | KSA | Ryan Al-Mousa |
| 99 | DF | KSA | Ahmed Al Muhaimeed |

=== Out on loan ===
Note: Flags indicate national team as defined under FIFA eligibility rules; some limited exceptions apply. Players may hold more than one non-FIFA nationality.

| No. | Pos. | Nation | Player |
|---|---|---|---|
| 5 | DF | KSA | Sultan Tankar (at Al-Arabi until 30 June 2024) |
| 14 | MF | KSA | Khalil Al-Absi (at Al-Arabi until 30 June 2024) |

| No. | Pos. | Nation | Player |
|---|---|---|---|
| 66 | FW | KSA | Turki Al-Mutairi (at Al-Orobah until 30 June 2024) |

== Transfers and loans ==
=== Transfers in ===
| Entry date | Position | No. | Player | From club | Fee | Ref. |
|---|---|---|---|---|---|---|
| 30 June 2023 | MF | 18 | (Saudi Arabia) Hammad Al-Shaye | (Saudi Arabia) Al-Najma | End of loan | |
| 30 June 2023 | MF | 95 | (Morocco) Nawfel Zerhouni | (Morocco) Raja CA | End of loan | |
| 30 June 2023 | FW | 90 | (Saudi Arabia) Muteb Al-Hammad | (Saudi Arabia) Al-Qadsiah | End of loan | |
| 1 July 2023 | GK | 30 | (Tunisia) Aymen Dahmen | (Tunisia) CS Sfaxien | Free | |
| 1 July 2023 | GK | 33 | (Saudi Arabia) Majed Al-Ghamdi | (Saudi Arabia) Ohod | Free | |
| 1 July 2023 | DF | 3 | (Saudi Arabia) Talal Al-Absi | (Saudi Arabia) Al-Ahli | Free | |
| 1 July 2023 | DF | 5 | (Saudi Arabia) Sultan Tankar | (Saudi Arabia) Jeddah | Free | |
| 1 July 2023 | MF | 6 | (Saudi Arabia) Basil Al-Sayyali | (Saudi Arabia) Al-Nassr | Free | |
| 1 July 2023 | MF | 19 | (Saudi Arabia) Nawaf Al-Habashi | (Saudi Arabia) Al-Riyadh | Free | |
| 1 July 2023 | FW | 11 | (Saudi Arabia) Mohammed Al-Thani | (Saudi Arabia) Ohod | Free | |
| 8 July 2023 | GK | 22 | (Saudi Arabia) Yazan Al-Ruwaili | (Saudi Arabia) Al-Orobah | Free | |
| 23 July 2023 | MF | 10 | (Comoros) Faïz Selemani | (Belgium) Kortrijk | $1,660,000 | |
| 24 July 2023 | MF | 20 | (Portugal) Tozé | (United Arab Emirates) Al-Nasr Dubai | Free | |
| 28 July 2023 | MF | 29 | (Brazil) Vina | (Brazil) Ceará | $1,200,000 | |
| 28 July 2023 | MF | 7 | (Saudi Arabia) Yousef Al-Shammari | (Saudi Arabia) Al-Batin | Undisclosed | |
| 28 July 2023 | MF | 15 | (Saudi Arabia) Ammar Al-Najjar | (Saudi Arabia) Damac | Free | |
| 29 July 2023 | FW | 66 | (Saudi Arabia) Turki Al-Mutairi | (Saudi Arabia) Al-Hilal | Free | |
| 30 July 2023 | MF | 14 | (Saudi Arabia) Khalil Al-Absi | (Saudi Arabia) Al-Nassr | Free | |
| 3 August 2023 | DF | 13 | (Saudi Arabia) Yazeed Al-Bakr | (Saudi Arabia) Al-Taawoun | Free | |
| 7 September 2023 | MF | 88 | (Saudi Arabia) Mohammed Abousaban | (Saudi Arabia) Al-Fayha | Free | |
| 7 September 2023 | MF | 95 | (Saudi Arabia) Ryan Al-Mousa | (Saudi Arabia) Damac | Free | |
| 10 February 2024 | MF | 93 | (Venezuela) Júnior Moreno | (United States) FC Cincinnati | Free | |
| 10 February 2024 | FW | 94 | (Saudi Arabia) Omar Al-Ruwaili | (Saudi Arabia) Abha | Undisclosed | |

=== Loans in ===
| Start date | End date | Position | No. | Player | From club | Fee | Ref. |
|---|---|---|---|---|---|---|---|
| 6 August 2023 | 30 January 2024 | DF | 24 | (Saudi Arabia) Mansour Al-Shammari | (Saudi Arabia) Al-Nassr | None | |
| 17 August 2023 | End of season | DF | 36 | (Brazil) Bruno Viana | (Brazil) Coritiba | None | |
| 25 August 2023 | End of season | FW | 90 | (The Gambia) Muhammed Badamosi | (Serbia) Čukarički | None | |
| 7 September 2023 | End of season | DF | 27 | (Saudi Arabia) Majed Qasheesh | (Saudi Arabia) Al-Nassr | None | |

=== Transfers out ===
| Exit date | Position | No. | Player | To club | Fee | Ref. |
|---|---|---|---|---|---|---|
| 30 June 2023 | MF | 16 | (Saudi Arabia) Basil Al-Sayyali | (Saudi Arabia) Al-Nassr | End of loan | |
| 30 June 2023 | MF | 20 | (Egypt) Youssef Obama | (Egypt) Zamalek | End of loan | |
| 30 June 2023 | MF | 70 | (Ghana) Francis Cann | (Portugal) Vizela | End of loan | |
| 30 June 2023 | FW | 98 | (Cameroon) Diederrick Joel Tagueu | (Portugal) Marítimo | End of loan | |
| 1 July 2023 | GK | 1 | (Saudi Arabia) Dawod Al Saeed | (Saudi Arabia) Al-Safa | Free | |
| 1 July 2023 | GK | 33 | (Saudi Arabia) Oqbah Al-Mushawah | (Saudi Arabia) Najran | Free | |
| 1 July 2023 | DF | 14 | (Saudi Arabia) Sultan Faqihi | (Saudi Arabia) Damac | Free | |
| 1 July 2023 | MF | 7 | (Saudi Arabia) Abdulhadi Al-Harajin | (Saudi Arabia) Al-Riyadh | Free | |
| 1 July 2023 | MF | 11 | (Netherlands) Ola John | (Saudi Arabia) Al-Arabi | Free | |
| 1 July 2023 | FW | 77 | (Saudi Arabia) Suleiman Al-Saeed | (Saudi Arabia) Al-Jabalain | Free | |
| 6 July 2023 | DF | 3 | (Saudi Arabia) Khaled Al-Barakah | (Saudi Arabia) Al-Najma | Free | |
| 21 July 2023 | MF | 95 | (Morocco) Nawfel Zerhouni | (Morocco) Raja CA | Free | |
| 31 August 2023 | MF | 10 | (Saudi Arabia) Thaar Al-Otaibi | (Saudi Arabia) Ohod | Free | |
| 7 September 2023 | DF | 61 | (Saudi Arabia) Radhi Al-Otaibi | (Saudi Arabia) Al-Ettifaq | Undisclosed | |
| 9 September 2023 | MF | 81 | (Saudi Arabia) Ibrahim Al-Barakah | (Saudi Arabia) Al-Bukiryah | Free | |
| 11 September 2023 | MF | 5 | (Saudi Arabia) Ahmed Al-Najei | (Saudi Arabia) Ohod | Free | |
| 12 September 2023 | FW | 89 | (Saudi Arabia) Ahmed Al-Shuwayfie | (Saudi Arabia) Al-Taraji | Free | |

=== Loans out ===
| Start date | End date | Position | No. | Player | To club | Fee | Ref. |
|---|---|---|---|---|---|---|---|
| 12 September 2023 | End of season | DF | 5 | (Saudi Arabia) Sultan Tankar | (Saudi Arabia) Al-Arabi | None | |
| 30 January 2024 | End of season | MF | 14 | (Saudi Arabia) Khalil Al-Absi | (Saudi Arabia) Al-Arabi | None | |
| 31 January 2024 | End of season | FW | 66 | (Saudi Arabia) Turki Al-Mutairi | (Saudi Arabia) Al-Orobah | None | |

== Pre-season ==
| 15 July 2023 Friendly | Al-Hazem (Saudi Arabia) | 1–3 | (Portugal) Leixões | Matosinhos, Portugal |
| 10:00 WEST | | Report | Marufdeen; Conceição; Ofori | Stadium: Estádio do Mar |

| 19 July 2023 Friendly | Al-Hazem (Saudi Arabia) | 3–4 | (Portugal) Boavista | Lousada, Portugal |
| 10:00 WEST | | Report | Santos 22'; Lourenço 39'; Morais 83' (pen.); Awaziem 86' | Stadium: Estádio Municipal de Lousada |

| 22 July 2023 Friendly | Al-Hazem (Saudi Arabia) | 0–1 | (Portugal) Santa Clara | Freamunde, Portugal |
| 18:00 WEST | | Report | Marcos | Stadium: Complexo Desportivo do SC Freamunde |

| 29 July 2023 Friendly | Al-Hazem (Saudi Arabia) | 2–1 | (Portugal) Trofense | Trofa, Portugal |
| 18:00 WEST | | Report | | Stadium: Estádio do CD Trofense |

== Competitions ==
=== Overview ===
| Competition | Record | | | | | | | |
| Competition | G | W | D | L | GF | GA | GD | Win % |
|---|---|---|---|---|---|---|---|---|
| Pro League | 34 | 4 | 12 | 18 | 34 | 76 | −42 | 11.76 |
| King Cup | 2 | 1 | 0 | 1 | 3 | 4 | −1 | 50.00 |
| Total | 36 | 5 | 12 | 19 | 37 | 80 | −43 | 13.89 |

Updated to match played 27 May 2024
Source: Competitions

=== Pro League ===
==== League table ====
| Pos | Team | Pld | W | D | L | GF | GA | GD | Pts | Qualification or relegation |
|---|---|---|---|---|---|---|---|---|---|---|
| 14 | Al-Riyadh | 34 | 8 | 11 | 15 | 33 | 57 | −24 | 35 | |
| 15 | Al-Okhdood | 34 | 9 | 6 | 19 | 33 | 52 | −19 | 33 | |
| 16 | Abha (R) | 34 | 9 | 5 | 20 | 38 | 87 | −49 | 32 | Relegation to Yelo League |
| 17 | Al-Tai (R) | 34 | 8 | 7 | 19 | 34 | 64 | −30 | 31 | Relegation to Yelo League |
| 18 | Al-Hazem (R) | 34 | 4 | 12 | 18 | 34 | 76 | −42 | 24 | Relegation to Yelo League |

Source: SPL
Rules for classification: 1) Points; 2) Head-to-head points; 3) Head-to-head goal difference; 4) Total goal difference; 5) Total goals scored; 6) Fair-play points
(Note: Head-to-head record is used only after all the matches between the teams in question have been played).
(R) Relegated

==== Results summary ====
| Overall | | | | | | | | Home | | | | | | Away | | | | | |
| Pld | W | D | L | GF | GA | GD | Pts | W | D | L | GF | GA | GD | W | D | L | GF | GA | GD |
|---|---|---|---|---|---|---|---|---|---|---|---|---|---|---|---|---|---|---|---|
| 34 | 4 | 12 | 18 | 34 | 76 | −42 | 24 | 3 | 5 | 9 | 17 | 41 | −24 | 1 | 7 | 9 | 17 | 35 | −18 |

Last updated: 27 May 2024.
Source: spl.com.sa

==== Results by round ====
| Round | 1 | 2 | 3 | 4 | 5 | 6 | 7 | 8 | 9 | 10 | 11 | 12 | 13 | 14 | 15 | 16 | 17 | 18 | 19 | 20 | 21 | 22 | 23 | 24 | 25 | 26 | 27 | 28 | 29 | 30 | 31 | 32 | 33 | 34 |
|---|---|---|---|---|---|---|---|---|---|---|---|---|---|---|---|---|---|---|---|---|---|---|---|---|---|---|---|---|---|---|---|---|---|---|
| Ground | A | H | A | A | H | H | A | H | A | H | A | H | A | H | A | H | A | H | A | H | H | A | A | H | A | H | A | H | A | H | A | H | A | H |
| Result | L | L | D | D | L | D | L | L | L | W | D | L | L | L | D | W | D | L | D | L | D | D | L | L | L | D | L | L | W | D | L | D | L | W |
| Position | 17 | 17 | 17 | 16 | 18 | 18 | 18 | 18 | 18 | 17 | 17 | 17 | 18 | 18 | 18 | 18 | 18 | 18 | 18 | 18 | 18 | 18 | 18 | 18 | 18 | 18 | 18 | 18 | 18 | 18 | 18 | 18 | 18 | 18 |

Updated to match(es) played on 27 May 2024. Source: spl.com.sa
A = Away; H = Home; W = Win; D = Draw; L = Loss

==== Matches ====
All times are local, AST (UTC+3).

Win Draw Loss Postponed

| 11 August 2023 1 | Al-Ahli | 3–1 | Al-Hazem | Jeddah |
| 21:00 | Firmino 6', 10', 72'; Hindi (yellow card) 87' | Report | Al-Shammari (yellow card) 13'; Al Mohaimed (yellow card) 20'; Vina 50' | Stadium: Prince Abdullah Al Faisal Stadium; Attendance: 24,006; Referee: Khaled Al-Teris |

| 18 August 2023 2 | Al-Hazem | 0–2 | Al-Ettifaq | Ar Rass |
| 21:00 | Al-Dakheel (yellow card) 2'; Ricardo (yellow card) 50'; Al-Mutairi (yellow card) 81' | Report | Quaison 17'; Vitinho 52' | Stadium: Al-Hazem Club Stadium; Attendance: 1,024; Referee: Raed Al-Zahrani |

| 25 August 2023 3 | Al-Fayha | 0–0 | Al-Hazem | Al Majma'ah |
| 18:00 | Majrashi (yellow card) 65' | Report | Al-Sayyali (yellow card) 39'; Al-Dakheel (yellow card) 42' | Stadium: Al Majma'ah Sports City; Attendance: 465; Referee: Sultan Al-Okairy |

| 29 August 2023 4 | Al-Khaleej | 1–1 | Al-Hazem | Dammam |
| 21:00 | Al-Khabrani (yellow card) 13'; Martins 22'; Šehić (yellow card) 62' | Report | Traoré (yellow card) 19'; Vina (yellow card) 36', (goal) 61' (pen.); Al-Aazmi (yellow card) 78'; Al Mohaimed (yellow card) 90+10' | Stadium: Prince Mohamed bin Fahd Stadium; Attendance: 1,889; Referee: Sami Al-Jires |

| 2 September 2023 5 | Al-Hazem | 1–5 | Al-Nassr | Buraidah |
| 21:00 | Badamosi 47' | Report | Ghareeb 33'; Al-Khaibari 45+8'; Otávio 57'; Ronaldo 68'; Mané 78'; Ali (yellow card) 90+1' | Stadium: King Abdullah Sport City Stadium; Attendance: 12,297; Referee: Darío Herrera (Argentina) |

| 16 September 2023 6 | Al-Hazem | 1–1 | Al-Tai | Ar Rass |
| 18:00 | Al-Sayyali (yellow card) 21'; Ricardo (yellow card) 25'; Tozé 45+4' (pen.); Al-Aazmi (yellow card) 59'; Viana (yellow card) 83'; M. Al-Shammari (yellow card) 90+4' | Report | Mensah 12' (pen.), (yellow card) 50'; Qassem (yellow card) 43'; Al-Nakhli (yellow card) 57' | Stadium: Al-Hazem Club Stadium; Attendance: 554; Referee: Mohammed Al-Daqqash |

| 21 September 2023 7 | Al-Shabab | 4–1 | Al-Hazem | Riyadh |
| 21:00 | Carrasco 45'; Al-Sqoor 45+2'; Banega 49' (pen.), 90+7'; Saïss (yellow card) 69'; Carlos (yellow card) 75'; Cuéllar (yellow card) 87' | Report | Abousaban (yellow card) 43'; Tozé 66' | Stadium: Prince Faisal bin Fahd Stadium; Attendance: 2,450; Referee: Majed Al-Shamrani |

| 29 September 2023 8 | Al-Hazem | 1–3 | Al-Taawoun | Ar Rass |
| 18:00 | Selemani (yellow card) 52'; Tozé 72' (pen.) | Report | Barrow 59'; Adam 86'; Al-Rouqi 90+14' | Stadium: Al-Hazem Club Stadium; Attendance: 959; Referee: Faisal Al-Blwi |

| 5 October 2023 9 | Damac | 4–1 | Al-Hazem | Khamis Mushait |
| 15:00 | Ceesay 16'; Nkoudou 42'; Al-Zain 46'; Viana 63' (o.g.); Hamed (yellow card) 82' | Report | Al-Habashi 83' | Stadium: Damac Club Stadium; Attendance: 312; Referee: Abdulrahman Al-Sultan |

| 21 October 2023 10 | Al-Hazem | 4–3 | Al-Raed | Ar Rass |
| 18:00 | Selemani 6', 42'; Al-Thani 36'; Badamosi 72' | Report | Sayoud 10', 45+10'; R. Al-Ghamdi (yellow card) 79'; Gonzalez 86' | Stadium: Al-Hazem Club Stadium; Attendance: 532; Referee: Fareeh Al-Jaloud |

| 26 October 2023 11 | Al-Ittihad | 2–2 | Al-Hazem | Jeddah |
| 21:00 | Benzema 26'; Al-Farhan (yellow card) 49'; Kadesh 81'; Al-Ghamdi (yellow card) 90+5' | Report | Abousaban (yellow card) 58'; Al-Thani 63'; Viana (yellow card) 74'; Selemani 86' | Stadium: Prince Abdullah Al Faisal Stadium; Attendance: 12,113; Referee: Alexis Herrera (Venezuela) |

| 5 November 2023 12 | Al-Hazem | 1–2 | Al-Wehda | Ar Rass |
| 18:00 | Viana 23', (yellow card) 45+2' (yellow-red card) 90'; Al Mohaimed (yellow card) 49' | Report | Al-Hafith (yellow card) 22'; Noor 70', 85'; Bakshween (yellow card) 81' | Stadium: Al-Hazem Club Stadium; Attendance: 427; Referee: Mohammed Al-Harbi |

| 11 November 2023 13 | Al-Okhdood | 2–1 | Al-Hazem | Najran |
| 18:00 | Tawamba 20', 90+3'; Al Mansour (yellow card) 25', (red card) 63'; Pedroza (yellow card) 45+2'; Al-Rubaie (yellow card) 90+11' | Report | Traoré (yellow card) 45+4'; Selemani (yellow card) 69'; T. Al-Absi (yellow card) 78'; Tozé 90+7' | Stadium: Prince Hathloul bin Abdul Aziz Sports City; Attendance: 588; Referee: Matthew Conger (New Zealand) |

| 25 November 2023 14 | Al-Hazem | 0–9 | Al-Hilal | Buraidah |
| 18:00 | Tozé (yellow card) 21' | Report | Mitrović 14'; Kanno 32'; Al-Qahtani 43'; Malcom 52', 55', 85', (yellow card) 90+5'; Al-Shehri 79', (yellow card) 83'; Al-Breik 81'; Milinković-Savić 90+3' | Stadium: King Abdullah Sport City Stadium; Attendance: 5,994; Referee: Fabio Maresca (Italy) |

| 30 November 2023 15 | Al-Riyadh | 0–0 | Al-Hazem | Riyadh |
| 18:00 | Al-Khaibari (yellow card) 56'; Touré (yellow card) 61' | Report | Ricardo (yellow card) 77' | Stadium: Prince Faisal bin Fahd Stadium; Attendance: 264; Referee: Mohammed Al-Daqqash |

| 7 December 2023 16 | Al-Hazem | 2–0 | Al-Fateh | Ar Rass |
| 18:00 | Viana 5'; Tozé 14' (pen.), (yellow card) 90+7'; Al-Mousa (yellow card) 88'; Al-Bakr (yellow card) 90' | Report | Saâdane (yellow card) 49' | Stadium: Al-Hazem Club Stadium; Attendance: 640; Referee: Ahmed Al-Rumaikhani |

| 14 December 2023 17 | Abha | 1–1 | Al-Hazem | Abha |
| 18:00 | Krychowiak 79'; Abdulelah S. (yellow card) 80'; Naji (yellow card) 85'; Sami (yellow card) 86' | Report | Al-Thani (yellow card) 53'; Selemani 64', (yellow card) 74'; Al Mohaimed (yellow card) 81'; Viana (yellow card) 89' | Stadium: Prince Sultan bin Abdul Aziz Stadium; Attendance: 257; Referee: Mohammed Al-Beredi |

| 22 December 2023 18 | Al-Hazem | 0–4 | Al-Ahli | Buraidah |
| 18:00 | Badamosi (yellow card) 22'; Qasheesh (yellow card) 38'; Al-Aazmi (yellow card) 89' | Report | Hamidou (yellow card) 40'; Mahrez 45+1'; Veiga 58'; Ibañez (yellow card) 66'; Al-Buraikan 81'; Demiral 90+1' | Stadium: King Abdullah Sport City Stadium; Attendance: 1,798; Referee: Juan Gabriel Benítez (Paraguay) |

| 28 December 2023 19 | Al-Ettifaq | 1–1 | Al-Hazem | Dammam |
| 18:00 | Gray 70' | Report | Viana (yellow card) 83'; Tozé 90+1' (pen.) | Stadium: Prince Mohamed bin Fahd Stadium; Attendance: 5,808; Referee: Abdullah Al-Harbi |

| 17 February 2024 20 | Al-Hazem | 1–3 | Al-Fayha | Ar Rass |
| 17:00 | Al-Thani 9'; Selemani (yellow card) 50'; Tozé (yellow card) 55' | Report | Onyekuru 13', 82'; Cimirot (yellow card) 29'; Al-Safri (yellow card) 45+2'; Nwakaeme 59' | Stadium: Al-Hazem Club Stadium; Attendance: 355; Referee: Majed Al-Shamrani |

| 24 February 2024 21 | Al-Hazem | 1–1 | Al-Khaleej | Ar Rass |
| 20:00 | Moreno (yellow card) 35'; Badamosi (yellow card) 46'; Ricardo 53'; Al-Salman (yellow card) 63' | Report | Ricardo 32' (o.g.); Martins (yellow card) 48'; Nasser (yellow card) 69'; Hawsawi (yellow card) 79' | Stadium: Al-Hazem Club Stadium; Attendance: 695; Referee: Mamdouh Al Shahdan |

| 29 February 2024 22 | Al-Nassr | 4–4 | Al-Hazem | Riyadh |
| 20:00 | Talisca 31' (pen.), 61', 71'; Mané 90+4' (pen.); Brozović (yellow card) 90+9' | Report | Badamosi (yellow card) 42'; Al Mohaimed 53', (yellow card) 88'; Tozé 66'; Selemani 84', (yellow card) 90+13'; Dahmen (yellow card) 90+3'; Ricardo 90+9' | Stadium: Al-Awwal Park; Attendance: 19,323; Referee: Shukri Al-Hanfoush |

| 8 March 2024 23 | Al-Tai | 1–0 | Al-Hazem | Ha'il |
| 17:00 | Mensah 6'; Misidjan (yellow card) 74'; Al-Harthi (yellow card) 90+7' | Report | Al-Juwaid (yellow card) 78'; Ricardo (yellow card) 90+8' | Stadium: Prince Abdul Aziz bin Musa'ed Stadium; Attendance: 5,323; Referee: Sultan Al-Harbi |

| 14 March 2024 24 | Al-Hazem | 0–3 | Al-Shabab | Ar Rass |
| 22:00 | Moreno (yellow card) 33'; Al-Najjar (yellow card) 83' | Report | Santos (yellow card) 11'; Viana 34' (o.g.); Al-Juwayr (yellow card) 36'; Diallo 53'; Cuéllar (yellow card) 75'; Radif 90+6' | Stadium: Al-Hazem Club Stadium; Attendance: 825; Referee: Georgi Kabakov (Bulgaria) |

| 29 March 2024 25 | Al-Taawoun | 4–0 | Al-Hazem | Buraidah |
| 22:00 | Girotto 62'; Adam 66', 76'; Al-Kuwaykibi 71' | Report | | Stadium: Al-Taawoun Club Stadium; Attendance: 3,271; Referee: Abdulsamad Bakri |

| 1 April 2024 26 | Al-Hazem | 0–0 | Damac | Ar Rass |
| 22:00 | | Report | Munshi (yellow card) 73' | Stadium: Al-Hazem Club Stadium; Attendance: 196; Referee: Abdulrahman Al-Sultan |

| 7 April 2024 27 | Al-Raed | 2–0 | Al-Hazem | Buraidah |
| 22:00 | Tavares 35', 46'; El Berkaoui (yellow card) 82' | Report | Al Mohaimed (yellow card) 45+3'; Viana (yellow card) 82' | Stadium: Al-Raed Club Stadium; Attendance: 2,782; Referee: Ahmed Al-Rumaikhani |

| 20 April 2024 28 | Al-Hazem | 2–3 | Al-Ittihad | Buraidah |
| 21:00 | Ricardo (yellow card) 39'; Al-Thani 60'; Tozé 63' | Report | Al-Amri 21'; Al-Shamrani (yellow card) 34'; Ricardo 57' (o.g.); Dahmen 90+6' (o.g.); Hegazi (yellow card) 90+7' | Stadium: King Abdullah Sport City Stadium; Attendance: 1,158; Referee: Mohammed Al-Daqqash |

| 25 April 2024 29 | Al-Wehda | 0–2 | Al-Hazem | Mecca |
| 21:00 | Al-Hafith (yellow card) 56' | Report | Al-Juwaid (red card) 37'; Selemani 64'; Badamosi 68'; Ricardo (yellow card) 90+8' | Stadium: King Abdul Aziz Stadium; Attendance: 695; Referee: Abdullah Al-Harbi |

| 2 May 2024 30 | Al-Hazem | 0–0 | Al-Okhdood | Ar Rass |
| 18:00 | Al-Thani (yellow card) 14'; Viana (yellow card) 45' | Report | Godwin (yellow card) 67'; Al-Habib (yellow card) 90+4' | Stadium: Al-Hazem Club Stadium; Attendance: 533; Referee: Shukri Al-Hanfoush |

| 11 May 2024 31 | Al-Hilal | 4–1 | Al-Hazem | Riyadh |
| 18:00 | Mitrović 15' (pen.), 45+3'; Neves (yellow card) 38'; Al-Juwaid 39' (o.g.); Milinković-Savić 45+6'; Koulibaly (yellow card) 47'; Al-Tambakti (yellow card) 90' | Report | Selemani 34'; Ricardo (yellow card) 90+4' | Stadium: Prince Faisal bin Fahd Stadium; Attendance: 11,230; Referee: Urs Schnyder (Switzerland) |

| 18 May 2024 32 | Al-Hazem | 1–1 | Al-Riyadh | Ar Rass |
| 19:20 | Ricardo 90+8' | Report | Viana 50' (o.g.); A. Al-Dossari (yellow card) 90+4'; Al Aqeel (yellow card) 90+12'; Touré (yellow card) 90+12' | Stadium: Al-Hazem Club Stadium; Attendance: 305; Referee: Majed Al-Shamrani |

| 23 May 2024 33 | Al-Fateh | 2–1 | Al-Hazem | Al-Hasa |
| 21:00 | Tello 30'; Zelarayán 40'; Al-Najdi (yellow card) 90+2' | Report | Al-Harbi (yellow card) 16'; Tozé 22'; Al-Obaid (yellow card) 35'; Selemani (yellow card) 90+5' | Stadium: Al-Fateh Club Stadium; Attendance: 3,854; Referee: Fareeh Al-Jaloud |

| 27 May 2024 34 | Al-Hazem | 2–1 | Abha | Ar Rass |
| 21:00 | Badamosi 58'; Al-Thani 80' | Report | Krychowiak (yellow card) 27'; Al-Mutairi (yellow card) 37'; Abdu 47'; Al-Qumayzi (yellow card) 85'; Tisserand (red card) 90+5' | Stadium: Al-Hazem Club Stadium; Attendance: 117; Referee: Faisal Al-Blwi |

=== King Cup ===
All times are local, AST (UTC+3).

| 24 September 2023 Round of 32 | Al-Hazem | 3–1 | Al-Arabi | Ar Rass |
| 21:00 | Selemani 10', 14'; Ricardo (yellow card) 20'; Al-Thani 30' | Report | Miranda 45+3'; Al-Muwallad (yellow card) 53' (yellow-red card) 82'; Jobson (yellow card) 64' | Stadium: Al-Hazem Club Stadium; Attendance: 364; Referee: Abdullah Al-Shehri |

| 30 October 2023 Round of 16 | Al-Hilal | 3–0 | Al-Hazem | Riyadh |
| 21:00 | Neves 52' (pen.); Mitrović 79', 83' (pen.) | Report | Abousaban (yellow card) 48' | Stadium: King Fahd International Stadium; Attendance: 9,363; Referee: Facundo Tello (Argentina) |

== Statistics ==
=== Appearances ===
Last updated on 27 May 2024.

| No. | Pos | Nat | Player | Total | | Pro League | | King Cup | |
| No. | Pos | Nat | Player | Apps | Goals | Apps | Goals | Apps | Goals |
Goalkeepers
| 23 | GK | (Saudi Arabia) KSA | Ibrahim Zaid | 11 | 0 | 10 | 0 | 1 | 0 |
| 30 | GK | (Tunisia) TUN | Aymen Dahmen | 25 | 0 | 24 | 0 | 1 | 0 |
| 33 | GK | (Saudi Arabia) KSA | Majed Al-Ghamdi | 0 | 0 | 0 | 0 | 0 | 0 |
Defenders
| 2 | DF | (Brazil) BRA | Paulo Ricardo | 29 | 3 | 26+1 | 3 | 2 | 0 |
| 3 | DF | (Saudi Arabia) KSA | Talal Al-Absi | 16 | 0 | 11+3 | 0 | 2 | 0 |
| 12 | DF | (Saudi Arabia) KSA | Farhan Al-Aazmi | 13 | 0 | 7+6 | 0 | 0 | 0 |
| 13 | DF | (Saudi Arabia) KSA | Yazeed Al-Bakr | 16 | 0 | 12+3 | 0 | 0+1 | 0 |
| 22 | DF | (Saudi Arabia) KSA | Fahad Al-Obaid | 3 | 0 | 2+1 | 0 | 0 | 0 |
| 25 | DF | (Saudi Arabia) KSA | Ahmed Asiri | 0 | 0 | 0 | 0 | 0 | 0 |
| 27 | DF | (Saudi Arabia) KSA | Majed Qasheesh | 28 | 0 | 25+1 | 0 | 2 | 0 |
| 34 | DF | (Saudi Arabia) KSA | Abdulrahman Al-Dakheel | 11 | 0 | 8+3 | 0 | 0 | 0 |
| 36 | DF | (Brazil) BRA | Bruno Viana | 30 | 2 | 27+1 | 2 | 2 | 0 |
| 55 | DF | (Saudi Arabia) KSA | Mohammed Al-Shaeri | 0 | 0 | 0 | 0 | 0 | 0 |
| 82 | DF | (Saudi Arabia) KSA | Abdulaziz Al-Harbi | 3 | 0 | 2+1 | 0 | 0 | 0 |
Midfielders
| 6 | MF | (Saudi Arabia) KSA | Basil Al-Sayyali | 23 | 0 | 8+13 | 0 | 1+1 | 0 |
| 7 | MF | (Saudi Arabia) KSA | Yousef Al-Shammari | 24 | 0 | 9+14 | 0 | 0+1 | 0 |
| 10 | MF | (Comoros) COM | Faïz Selemani | 28 | 9 | 25+1 | 7 | 2 | 2 |
| 15 | MF | (Saudi Arabia) KSA | Ammar Al-Najjar | 6 | 0 | 0+6 | 0 | 0 | 0 |
| 16 | MF | (Saudi Arabia) KSA | Ahmed Al-Juwaid | 10 | 0 | 5+5 | 0 | 0 | 0 |
| 17 | MF | (Saudi Arabia) KSA | Sultan Al-Eisa | 0 | 0 | 0 | 0 | 0 | 0 |
| 18 | MF | (Saudi Arabia) KSA | Azzam Al-Salman | 5 | 0 | 3+2 | 0 | 0 | 0 |
| 20 | MF | (Portugal) POR | Tozé | 36 | 9 | 34 | 9 | 2 | 0 |
| 29 | MF | (Brazil) BRA | Vina | 21 | 2 | 18+3 | 2 | 0 | 0 |
| 78 | MF | (Saudi Arabia) KSA | Hassan Bandar | 0 | 0 | 0 | 0 | 0 | 0 |
| 85 | MF | (Saudi Arabia) KSA | Rayan Al-Sharekh | 0 | 0 | 0 | 0 | 0 | 0 |
| 88 | MF | (Saudi Arabia) KSA | Mohammed Abousaban | 15 | 0 | 8+5 | 0 | 1+1 | 0 |
| 93 | MF | (Venezuela) VEN | Júnior Moreno | 14 | 0 | 14 | 0 | 0 | 0 |
| 95 | MF | (Saudi Arabia) KSA | Ryan Al-Mousa | 13 | 0 | 8+4 | 0 | 0+1 | 0 |
| 99 | MF | (Saudi Arabia) KSA | Ahmed Al Mohaimed | 27 | 1 | 20+6 | 1 | 1 | 0 |
Forwards
| 9 | FW | (Saudi Arabia) KSA | Nawaf Al-Bishri | 0 | 0 | 0 | 0 | 0 | 0 |
| 11 | FW | (Saudi Arabia) KSA | Mohammed Al-Thani | 32 | 6 | 22+8 | 5 | 2 | 1 |
| 19 | FW | (Saudi Arabia) KSA | Nawaf Al-Habashi | 30 | 1 | 5+23 | 1 | 0+2 | 0 |
| 90 | FW | (The Gambia) GAM | Muhammed Badamosi | 32 | 4 | 23+7 | 4 | 2 | 0 |
| 94 | FW | (Saudi Arabia) KSA | Omar Al-Ruwaili | 3 | 0 | 0+3 | 0 | 0 | 0 |
Players sent out on loan this season
| 5 | DF | (Saudi Arabia) KSA | Sultan Tankar | 1 | 0 | 1 | 0 | 0 | 0 |
| 14 | MF | (Saudi Arabia) KSA | Khalil Al-Absi | 3 | 0 | 0+3 | 0 | 0 | 0 |
| 66 | FW | (Saudi Arabia) KSA | Turki Al-Mutairi | 10 | 0 | 0+9 | 0 | 0+1 | 0 |
Player who made an appearance this season but have left the club
| 21 | MF | (Ivory Coast) CIV | Ben Hassan Traoré | 12 | 0 | 11 | 0 | 1 | 0 |
| 24 | DF | (Saudi Arabia) KSA | Mansour Al-Shammari | 3 | 0 | 1+2 | 0 | 0 | 0 |
| 61 | DF | (Saudi Arabia) KSA | Radhi Al-Otaibi | 5 | 0 | 5 | 0 | 0 | 0 |

=== Goalscorers ===
| Rank | No. | Pos | Nat | Name | Pro League | King Cup | Total |
|---|---|---|---|---|---|---|---|
| 1 | 10 | MF | (Comoros) | Faïz Selemani | 7 | 2 | 9 |
| 1 | 20 | MF | (Portugal) | Tozé | 9 | 0 | 9 |
| 3 | 11 | FW | (Saudi Arabia) | Mohammed Al-Thani | 5 | 1 | 6 |
| 4 | 90 | FW | (The Gambia) | Muhammed Badamosi | 4 | 0 | 4 |
| 5 | 2 | DF | (Brazil) | Paulo Ricardo | 3 | 0 | 3 |
| 6 | 29 | MF | (Brazil) | Vina | 2 | 0 | 2 |
| 6 | 36 | DF | (Brazil) | Bruno Viana | 2 | 0 | 2 |
| 8 | 19 | FW | (Saudi Arabia) | Nawaf Al-Habashi | 1 | 0 | 1 |
| 8 | 99 | MF | (Saudi Arabia) | Ahmed Al Mohaimed | 1 | 0 | 1 |
| Own goal | | | | | 0 | 0 | 0 |
| Total | | | | | 34 | 3 | 37 |

Last Updated: 27 May 2024

=== Assists ===
| Rank | No. | Pos | Nat | Name | Pro League | King Cup | Total |
|---|---|---|---|---|---|---|---|
| 1 | 20 | MF | (Portugal) | Tozé | 7 | 0 | 7 |
| 2 | 10 | MF | (Comoros) | Faïz Selemani | 4 | 1 | 5 |
| 3 | 27 | DF | (Saudi Arabia) | Majed Qasheesh | 2 | 0 | 2 |
| 4 | 7 | MF | (Saudi Arabia) | Yousef Al-Shammari | 1 | 0 | 1 |
| 4 | 16 | MF | (Saudi Arabia) | Ahmed Al-Juwaid | 1 | 0 | 1 |
| 4 | 21 | MF | (Ivory Coast) | Ben Hassan Traoré | 0 | 1 | 1 |
| 4 | 22 | DF | (Saudi Arabia) | Fahad Al-Obaid | 1 | 0 | 1 |
| 4 | 30 | GK | (Tunisia) | Aymen Dahmen | 1 | 0 | 1 |
| 4 | 90 | FW | (The Gambia) | Muhammed Badamosi | 1 | 0 | 1 |
| 4 | 95 | MF | (Saudi Arabia) | Ryan Al-Mousa | 1 | 0 | 1 |
| Total | | | | | 19 | 2 | 21 |

Last Updated: 27 May 2024

=== Clean sheets ===
| Rank | No. | Pos | Nat | Name | Pro League | King Cup | Total |
|---|---|---|---|---|---|---|---|
| 1 | 30 | GK | (Tunisia) | Aymen Dahmen | 6 | 0 | 6 |
| Total | | | | | 6 | 0 | 6 |

Last Updated: 2 May 2024
