= 2022–23 Al-Hazem F.C. season =

Al-Hazem
2022–23 season
- President: Salman Al-Malik
- Manager: Filipe Gouveia
- Stadium: Al-Hazem Club Stadium
- FDL: 2nd (promoted)
- Top goalscorer: League: Ola John (18 goals); All: Ola John (18 goals)
- All statistics correct as of 29 May 2022.

The 2022–23 season was Al-Hazem's 66th year in their existence and their first back season in the FD League. Al-Hazem were relegated to the second tier of Saudi football after finishing 16th in the 2021–22 Saudi Pro League.

The season covered the period from 1 July 2022 to 30 June 2023.

== Players ==
=== Squad information ===
As of 1 February 2023

Note: Flags indicate national team as defined under FIFA eligibility rules; some limited exceptions apply. Players may hold more than one non-FIFA nationality.

No.	Pos.	Nation	Player
1	GK	KSA	Dawod Al Saeed
2	DF	BRA	Paulo Ricardo
3	DF	KSA	Khaled Al-Barakah
5	MF	KSA	Ahmed Al-Najei
6	MF	KSA	Ahmed Al-Juwaid
7	MF	KSA	Abdulhadi Al-Harajin
10	MF	KSA	Thaar Al-Otaibi
11	MF	NED	Ola John
12	DF	KSA	Farhan Al-Aazmi
14	DF	KSA	Sultan Faqihi
16	MF	KSA	Basil Al-Sayyali (on loan from Al-Nassr)
19	DF	KSA	Ahmed Al Muhaimeed
20	MF	EGY	Youssef Obama (on loan from Zamalek)

No.	Pos.	Nation	Player
21	MF	CIV	Ben Traoré (on loan from Leixões)
23	GK	KSA	Ibrahim Zaid
24	DF	KSA	Fahad Al-Obaid
28	DF	KSA	Abdullah Al-Shammari
33	GK	KSA	Oqbah Al-Mushawah
34	DF	KSA	Abdulrahman Al-Dakheel
42	FW	KSA	Abdulaziz Al-Harbi
61	DF	KSA	Radhi Al-Otaibi
70	MF	GHA	Francis Cann (on loan from Vizela)
77	FW	KSA	Sulaiman Al-Saeed
81	MF	KSA	Ibrahim Al-Barakah
89	FW	KSA	Ahmed Al-Shuwayfie
98	FW	CMR	Joel Tagueu (on loan from Marítimo)

=== Out on loan ===
Note: Flags indicate national team as defined under FIFA eligibility rules; some limited exceptions apply. Players may hold more than one non-FIFA nationality.

No.	Pos.	Nation	Player
18	MF	KSA	Hammad Al-Shaye (at Al-Najma until 30 June 2023)
90	FW	KSA	Muteb Al-Hammad (at Al-Qadsiah until 30 June 2023)

No.	Pos.	Nation	Player
95	MF	MAR	Nawfel Zerhouni (at Raja until 30 June 2023)

== Transfers and loans ==
=== Transfers in ===
Entry date	Position	No.	Player	From club	Fee	Ref.
30 June 2022	GK	33	(Saudi Arabia) Majed Al-Ghamdi	(Saudi Arabia) Al-Jeel	End of loan	
30 June 2022	DF	50	(Saudi Arabia) Radhi Al-Otaibi	(Saudi Arabia) Al-Qadsiah	End of loan	
30 June 2022	MF	10	(Mali) Ibrahima Tandia	(Saudi Arabia) Al-Adalah	End of loan	
30 June 2022	MF	12	(Saudi Arabia) Ghallab Al-Enezi	(Saudi Arabia) Al-Jabalain	End of loan	
30 June 2022	MF	18	(Saudi Arabia) Hammad Al-Shaye	(Saudi Arabia) Al-Saqer	End of loan	
30 June 2022	MF	81	(Saudi Arabia) Ibrahim Al-Barakah	(Saudi Arabia) Al-Fayha	End of loan	
30 June 2022	FW	77	(Saudi Arabia) Sulaiman Al-Saeed	(Saudi Arabia) Al-Diriyah	End of loan	
30 June 2022	FW	90	(Saudi Arabia) Muteb Al-Hammad	(Saudi Arabia) Al-Ain	End of loan	
30 June 2022	FW	91	(Saudi Arabia) Mohammed Al-Dahami	(Saudi Arabia) Al-Najma	End of loan	
29 July 2022	GK	33	(Saudi Arabia) Oqbah Al-Mushawah	(Saudi Arabia) Al-Okhdood	Free	
29 July 2022	DF	93	(Brazil) Carlos Henrique	(Saudi Arabia) Najran	Free	
29 July 2022	MF	38	(Saudi Arabia) Bader Al-Johani	(Saudi Arabia) Al-Nahda	Free	
29 July 2022	FW	94	(Brazil) Uilliam	(Saudi Arabia) Al-Sahel	Free	
27 August 2022	DF	19	(Saudi Arabia) Ahmed Al Muhaimeed	(Saudi Arabia) Al-Ettifaq	Free	
7 September 2022	FW	–	(Saudi Arabia) Meshari Al-Khalifah	(Saudi Arabia) Al-Taawoun	Free	
22 January 2023	DF	2	(Brazil) Paulo Ricardo	(Finland) KuPS	Free	

=== Loans in ===
Start date	End date	Position	No.	Player	From club	Fee	Ref.
27 August 2022	End of season	MF	16	(Saudi Arabia) Basil Al-Sayyali	(Saudi Arabia) Al-Nassr	None	
18 January 2023	End of season	FW	98	(Cameroon) Diederrick Joel Tagueu	(Portugal) Marítimo	None	
22 January 2023	End of season	MF	20	(Egypt) Youssef Obama	(Egypt) Zamalek	None	
27 January 2023	End of season	MF	70	(Ghana) Francis Cann	(Portugal) Vizela	None	
28 January 2023	End of season	MF	21	(Ivory Coast) Ben Traoré	(Portugal) Leixões	None	

=== Transfers out ===
Exit date	Position	No.	Player	To club	Fee	Ref.
30 June 2022	GK	31	(Saudi Arabia) Habib Al-Wotayan	(Saudi Arabia) Al-Hilal	End of loan	
30 June 2022	DF	2	(Saudi Arabia) Abdulrahman Al-Rio	(Saudi Arabia) Damac	End of loan	
30 June 2022	DF	27	(Brazil) Hueglo Neris	(United Arab Emirates) Al-Wasl	End of loan	
30 June 2022	DF	88	(Saudi Arabia) Osama Al-Khalaf	(Saudi Arabia) Al-Nassr	End of loan	
30 June 2022	MF	15	(Saudi Arabia) Hamad Al-Abdan	(Saudi Arabia) Al-Hilal	End of loan	
30 June 2022	MF	29	(Saudi Arabia) Saleh Al-Harthi	(Saudi Arabia) Al-Okhdood	End of loan	
30 June 2022	MF	80	(Saudi Arabia) Abdulelah Al-Shammeri	(Saudi Arabia) Al-Shabab	End of loan	
30 June 2022	FW	19	(Nigeria) Ezekiel Henty	(Slovakia) Slovan Bratislava	End of loan	
1 July 2022	GK	33	(Saudi Arabia) Majed Al-Ghamdi	(Saudi Arabia) Ohod	Free	
1 July 2022	FW	87	(Saudi Arabia) Mohammad Al-Sahlawi		Released	
3 July 2022	MF	16	(Saudi Arabia) Saud Zidan	(Saudi Arabia) Al-Fayha	Undisclosed	
16 July 2022	MF	12	(Saudi Arabia) Ghallab Al-Enezi	(Saudi Arabia) Al-Shoulla	Free	
1 August 2022	FW	47	(Saudi Arabia) Basim Al-Oraini	(Saudi Arabia) Al-Taawoun	Free	
21 August 2022	MF	17	(Saudi Arabia) Abdulrahman Al-Harthi	(Saudi Arabia) Al-Ain	Free	
22 August 2022	MF	10	(Mali) Ibrahima Tandia	(Libya) Al-Ahli Tripoli	Free	
2 September 2022	DF	2	(Saudi Arabia) Yousef Al-Mosaabi	(Saudi Arabia) Al-Qawarah	Free	
5 September 2022	DF	93	(Brazil) Carlos Henrique	(Saudi Arabia) Al-Shoulla	Free	
23 January 2023	FW	94	(Brazil) Uilliam	(Saudi Arabia) Al-Kholood	Free	
26 January 2023	FW	9	(Niger) Yousef Omar	(Saudi Arabia) Al-Washm	Free	
29 January 2023	MF	99	(Morocco) Abdelilah Hafidi	(Morocco) Raja	Free	
31 January 2023	DF	67	(Saudi Arabia) Mohammed Abdulrahman	(Saudi Arabia) Al-Shoulla	Free	
31 January 2023	MF	38	(Saudi Arabia) Bader Al-Johani	(Saudi Arabia) Al-Shoulla	Free	
9 February 2023	MF	4	(Brazil) Alison	(Brazil) Santos	Free	
9 February 2023	MF	8	(Serbia) Luka Stojanović	(Serbia) FK Čukarički	Free	

=== Loans out ===
Start date	End date	Position	No.	Player	To club	Fee	Ref.
15 September 2022	End of season	MF	18	(Saudi Arabia) Hammad Al-Shaye	(Saudi Arabia) Al-Najma	None	
23 January 2023	End of season	MF	95	(Morocco) Nawfel Zerhouni	(Morocco) Raja	None	
27 January 2023	End of season	FW	90	(Saudi Arabia) Muteb Al-Hammad	(Saudi Arabia) Al-Qadsiah	None	

== Pre-season ==
30 July 2022 Friendly	Al-Hazem (Saudi Arabia)	0–1	(Serbia) FK Budućnost Arilje	Užice, Serbia
18:30 CEST				Stadium: Radomir Antić Stadium

2 August 2022 Friendly	Al-Hazem (Saudi Arabia)	1–0	(Serbia) FK FAP	Užice, Serbia
18:00 CEST	Uilliam 17'			Stadium: Radomir Antić Stadium

6 August 2022 Friendly	Al-Hazem (Saudi Arabia)	5–1	(Serbia) FK Jedinstvo Užice	Užice, Serbia
17:30 CEST	Al-Saeed 8'; Stojanović 15'; Hafidi 30'; Omar 75'; Al-Shuwayfie 90'			Stadium: Stadion Krčagovo

9 August 2022 Friendly	Al-Hazem (Saudi Arabia)	3–3	(United Arab Emirates) Dibba Al Fujairah	Užice, Serbia
18:00 CEST	Stojanović 21'; Al-Harajin 50'; Al-Aazmi 68'	Report	Mohamed 60'; Álvaro 65', 85'	Stadium: Radomir Antić Stadium

13 August 2022 Friendly	Al-Hazem (Saudi Arabia)	1–1	(United Arab Emirates) Al Dhafra	Užice, Serbia
17:30 CEST	John 21'	Report	45'	Stadium: Radomir Antić Stadium

== Competitions ==
=== First Division League ===
==== League table ====
Pos	Team	Pld	W	D	L	GF	GA	GD	Pts	Promotion, qualification or relegation
1	Al-Ahli (C, P)	34	21	9	4	48	24	+24	72	Promotion to the Pro League
2	Al-Hazem (P)	34	20	8	6	55	29	+26	68 (Note: Al-Hazem finished ahead of Al-Okhdood on head-to-head points: Al-Hazem: 6 pts, Al-Okhdood: 0 pts (Al-Hazem 1–0 Al-Okhdood, Al-Okhdood 0–1 Al-Hazem).)	Promotion to the Pro League
3	Al-Okhdood (P)	34	21	5	8	64	35	+29	68	Promotion to the Pro League
4	Al-Riyadh (P)	34	19	6	9	52	37	+15	63	Promotion to the Pro League
5	Al-Faisaly	34	16	10	8	45	32	+13	58	
6	Al-Arabi	34	13	10	11	43	43	0	49	
7	Al-Kholood	34	12	7	15	33	31	+2	43 (Note: Al-Kholood finished ahead of Hajer on overall goal difference: Al-Kholood +2, Hajer −5 (Hajer 1–0 Al-Kholood, Al-Kholood 1–0 Hajer).)	
8	Hajer	34	11	10	13	36	41	−5	43	
9	Ohod	34	10	12	12	29	38	−9	42	
10	Al-Jabalain	34	9	14	11	42	43	−1	41	
11	Al-Qadsiah	34	10	10	14	29	34	−5	40 (Note: Positions determined by head-to-head points: Al-Qadsiah: 9 pts; Al-Orobah: 7 pts; Al-Qaisumah: 1 pts.)	
12	Al-Orobah	34	11	7	16	35	41	−6	40 (Note: Al-Shoulla were awarded a 3–0 win over Al-Orobah due to Al-Orobah's inability to hold the fixture.)	
13	Al-Qaisumah	34	8	16	10	35	44	−9	40	
14	Al-Ain	34	11	6	17	34	46	−12	39	
15	Jeddah	34	10	8	16	34	40	−6	38	
16	Najran (R)	34	9	9	16	36	54	−18	36	Relegation to the Second Division
17	Al-Sahel (R)	34	7	11	16	36	51	−15	32	Relegation to the Second Division
18	Al-Shoulla (R)	34	5	8	21	23	46	−23	23	Relegation to the Second Division

Updated to match(es) played on 29 May 2023. Source: goalzz.com
Rules for classification: 1) Points; 2) Head-to-head points; 3) Head-to-head goal difference; 4) Total goal difference; 5) Total goals scored; 6) Fair-play points (Note: Head-to-head record is used only after all the matches between the teams in question have been played).
(C) Champions; (P) Promoted; (R) Relegated

==== Results summary ====
Overall								Home						Away					
Pld	W	D	L	GF	GA	GD	Pts	W	D	L	GF	GA	GD	W	D	L	GF	GA	GD
34	20	8	6	55	29	+26	68	12	4	1	31	12	+19	8	4	5	24	17	+7

Last updated: 29 May 2023.
Source: kooora.com

==== Results by round ====
Round	1	2	3	4	5	6	7	8	9	10	11	12	13	14	15	16	17	18	19	20	21	22	23	24	25	26	27	28	29	30	31	32	33	34
Ground	H	A	H	A	H	A	H	A	H	H	A	H	A	H	A	H	A	A	H	A	H	A	H	A	H	A	A	H	A	H	A	H	A	H
Result	W	W	W	D	D	L	W	L	W	W	D	D	L	W	W	W	L	W	W	W	W	W	W	D	W	W	D	D	L	L	W	W	W	D
Position	5	5	2	2	2	3	3	4	3	3	2	3	4	4	2	2	3	2	2	1	1	1	1	2	1	1	2	3	4	4	3	3	2	2

Updated to match(es) played on 29 May 2023. Source:
A = Away; H = Home; W = Win; D = Draw; L = Loss

==== Matches ====
All times are local, AST (UTC+3).

Win Draw Loss Postponed

24 August 2022 1	Al-Hazem	2–1	Jeddah	Ar Rass
19:10	John 49', 66'	Report	Baadheem 90+7'	Stadium: Al-Hazem Club Stadium; Referee: Abdullah Zarban

30 August 2022 2	Al-Orobah	0–2	Al-Hazem	Sakakah
19:20		Report	John 30'; Zerhouni 71'	Stadium: Al-Orobah Club Stadium; Referee: Ahmed Al-Barakati

5 September 2022 3	Al-Hazem	4–1	Najran	Ar Rass
19:00	Al-Saeed 19'; Hafidi 32'; Al-Otaibi 68'; Al-Harajin 90+3'	Report	Hawsawi 78'	Stadium: Al-Hazem Club Stadium; Referee: Mohammed Abo Shaqara

12 September 2022 4	Al-Qaisumah	1–1	Al-Hazem	Hafar al-Batin
18:40	Al Salama 40' (pen.)	Report	John 66'	Stadium: Al-Batin Club Stadium; Referee: Bandar Al-Qahtani

17 September 2022 5	Al-Hazem	1–1	Al-Kholood	Ar Rass
20:30	Al-Harajin 88'	Report	Dias 90+4'	Stadium: Al-Hazem Club Stadium; Referee: Meshal Al-Shehri

3 October 2022 6	Hajer	3–2	Al-Hazem	Al-Hasa
18:05	Pardal 6', 55' (pen.); Bo Amer 40'	Report	Al-Shuwayfie 70', 89'	Stadium: Hajer Club Stadium; Referee: Hussain Abo Shahin

10 October 2022 7	Al-Hazem	1–0	Al-Qadsiah	Ar Rass
18:15	Al-Harajin 26'	Report		Stadium: Al-Hazem Club Stadium; Referee: Turki Al-Hashlan

19 October 2022 8	Ohod	2–1	Al-Hazem	Medina
18:30	Al-Thani 17'; Al-Harbi 84'	Report	Stojanović 4' (pen.)	Stadium: Ohod Club Stadium; Referee: Musaad Al-Meshari

25 October 2022 9	Al-Hazem	1–0	Al-Okhdood	Ar Rass
18:05	John 90+4' (pen.)	Report		Stadium: Al-Hazem Club Stadium; Referee: Khaled Al-Teris

31 October 2022 10	Al-Hazem	2–1	Al-Riyadh	Ar Rass
17:50	John 33'; Al-Dakheel 80'	Report	Stojiljković 47'	Stadium: Al-Hazem Club Stadium; Referee: Mohammed Al-Daqqash

9 November 2022 11	Al-Shoulla	0–0	Al-Hazem	Al-Kharj
17:45		Report		Stadium: Al-Shoulla Club Stadium; Referee: Abdulsamad Bakri

15 November 2022 12	Al-Hazem	2–2	Al-Jabalain	Ar Rass
19:40	Al-Hammad 81'; Al-Otaibi 87'		Fallatah 35'; Bensayah 66'	Stadium: Al-Hazem Club Stadium; Referee: Abdullah Zarban

19 December 2022 13	Al-Faisaly	3–2	Al-Hazem	Al Majma'ah
17:50	Omar 35'; Cassiano 45+7', 90+15'	Report	John 42', 90+1' (pen.)	Stadium: Al Majma'ah Sports City; Referee: Mohammed Abo Shaqqara

28 December 2022 14	Al-Hazem	2–0	Al-Ain	Ar Rass
15:25	T. Al-Otaibi 37'; John 90+3' (pen.)	Report		Stadium: Al-Hazem Club Stadium; Referee: Sultan Okairy

4 January 2023 15	Al-Sahel	2–3	Al-Hazem	Khobar
15:00	Diomandé 45+1' (pen.), 90+8'	Report	John 26' (pen.), 30'; S. Al-Saeed 66'	Stadium: Prince Saud bin Jalawi Stadium; Referee: Mohammed Al-Amri

11 January 2023 16	Al-Hazem	3–0	Al-Arabi	Ar Rass
15:25	John 9' (pen.); Al-Sayyali 27'; T. Al-Otaibi 55'	Report		Stadium: Al-Hazem Club Stadium; Referee: Raed Al-Zahrani

18 January 2023 17	Al-Ahli	1–0	Al-Hazem	Jeddah
18:40	Al-Mogren 74'	Report		Stadium: Prince Abdullah Al Faisal Stadium; Referee: Mohammed Al-Daqqash

27 January 2023 18	Jeddah	1–3	Al-Hazem	Jeddah
18:55	Opoku 45+6'	Report	Tagueu 5'; Grassi 53' (o.g.); Obama 77'	Stadium: Prince Abdullah Al Faisal Stadium; Referee: Fraih Al-Jaloud

1 February 2023 19	Al-Hazem	2–1	Al-Orobah	Ar Rass
15:50	Cann 65'; Al-Harajin 89'	Report	Rayllan 68'	Stadium: Al-Hazem Club Stadium; Referee: Mohammed Al-Ghamdi

7 February 2023 20	Najran	0–3	Al-Hazem	Najran
16:00		Report	Tagueu 11', 56'; Al-Aazmi 73'	Stadium: Prince Hathloul bin Abdul Aziz Sports City; Referee: Hussain Abo Shahin

15 February 2023 21	Al-Hazem	3–0	Al-Qaisumah	Ar Rass
15:55	Tagueu 4'; Al-Harajin 50'; Cann 55'	Report		Stadium: Al-Hazem Club Stadium; Referee: Turki Hashlan

20 February 2023 22	Al-Kholood	0–2	Al-Hazem	Ar Rass
16:00		Report	Cann 40'; Al-Harajin 45+3'	Stadium: Al-Hazem Club Stadium; Referee: Khaled Al-Ahmari

27 February 2023 23	Al-Hazem	2–0	Hajer	Ar Rass
16:00	John 45+4' (pen.); Al-Shuwayfie 80'	Report		Stadium: Al-Hazem Club Stadium; Referee: Musaad Al-Shehri

6 March 2023 24	Al-Qadsiah	1–1	Al-Hazem	Khobar
18:25	Aribi 7'	Report	John 84'	Stadium: Prince Saud bin Jalawi Stadium; Referee: Mohammed Al-Ghamdi

14 March 2023 25	Al-Hazem	2–1	Ohod	Ar Rass
18:55	John 14'; Tagueu 44'	Report	Al-Allati 90+5'	Stadium: Al-Hazem Club Stadium; Referee: Raed Al-Zahrani

3 April 2023 27	Al-Riyadh	0–0	Al-Hazem	Riyadh
21:30		Report		Stadium: Prince Turki bin Abdul Aziz Stadium; Referee: Turki Hashlan

9 April 2023 28	Al-Hazem	1–1	Al-Shoulla	Ar Rass
21:50	John 2'	Report	Ijrouten 90+2'	Stadium: Al-Hazem Club Stadium; Referee: Mohammed Abo Shaqara

26 April 2023 29	Al-Jabalain	3–1	Al-Hazem	Ha'il
18:55	Isael 9'; Bensayah 15'; Plata 63'	Report	Tagueu 40'	Stadium: Prince Abdul Aziz bin Musa'ed Stadium; Referee: Khaled Al-Ahmari

1 May 2023 30	Al-Hazem	0–1	Al-Faisaly	Ar Rass
19:30		Report	Semedo 53'	Stadium: Al-Hazem Club Stadium; Referee: Fraih Al-Jaloud

5 May 2023 26	Al-Okhdood	0–1	Al-Hazem	Najran
19:00		Report	John 24' (pen.)	Stadium: Prince Hathloul bin Abdul Aziz Sports City; Referee: Shukri Al-Hanfoush

10 May 2023 31	Al-Ain	0–1	Al-Hazem	Al Bahah
15:50		Report	Tagueu 62'	Stadium: King Saud Sport City Stadium; Referee: Ahmed Al-Barakati

17 May 2023 32	Al-Hazem	3–2	Al-Sahel	Ar Rass
19:25	Al-Beshri 69'; John 90+1'; Al-Harajin 90+9'	Report	A. Al-Dawsari 28'; Diomandé 80' (pen.)	Stadium: Al-Hazem Club Stadium; Referee: Sultan Okairy

23 May 2023 33	Al-Arabi	0–1	Al-Hazem	Unaizah
21:00		Report	Al Muhaimeed 58'	Stadium: Department of Education Stadium; Referee: Mohammed Al-Ghamdi

29 May 2023 34	Al-Hazem	0–0	Al-Ahli	Ar Rass
21:00		Report		Stadium: Al-Hazem Club Stadium; Referee: Mohammed Al-Amri

== Statistics ==
=== Appearances ===
Last updated on 29 May 2023.

No.	Pos	Nat	Player	Total		FD League	
No.	Pos	Nat	Player	Apps	Goals	Apps	Goals
Goalkeepers
1	GK	(Saudi Arabia) KSA	Dawod Al Saeed	12	0	10+2	0
23	GK	(Saudi Arabia) KSA	Ibrahim Zaid	24	0	24	0
33	GK	(Saudi Arabia) KSA	Oqbah Al-Mushawah	0	0	0	0
Defenders
2	DF	(Brazil) BRA	Paulo Ricardo	16	0	16	0
3	DF	(Saudi Arabia) KSA	Khaled Al-Barakah	7	0	5+2	0
12	DF	(Saudi Arabia) KSA	Farhan Al-Aazmi	23	1	18+5	1
14	DF	(Saudi Arabia) KSA	Sultan Faqihi	24	0	12+12	0
19	DF	(Saudi Arabia) KSA	Ahmed Al Muhaimeed	21	1	10+11	1
24	DF	(Saudi Arabia) KSA	Fahad Al-Obaid	14	0	13+1	0
28	DF	(Saudi Arabia) KSA	Abdullah Al-Shammari	19	0	14+5	0
34	DF	(Saudi Arabia) KSA	Abdulrahman Al-Dakheel	27	1	27	1
61	DF	(Saudi Arabia) KSA	Radhi Al-Otaibi	29	1	27+2	1
Midfielders
4	MF	(Saudi Arabia) KSA	Rayan Al-Sharekh	1	0	0+1	0
5	MF	(Saudi Arabia) KSA	Ahmed Al-Najei	18	0	14+4	0
6	MF	(Saudi Arabia) KSA	Ahmed Al-Juwaid	11	0	0+11	0
7	MF	(Saudi Arabia) KSA	Abdulhadi Al-Harajin	25	7	13+12	7
10	MF	(Saudi Arabia) KSA	Thaar Al-Otaibi	24	3	9+15	3
11	MF	(Netherlands) NED	Ola John	31	18	31	18
16	MF	(Saudi Arabia) KSA	Basil Al-Sayyali	25	1	24+1	1
20	MF	(Egypt) EGY	Youssef Obama	16	1	15+1	1
21	MF	(Ivory Coast) CIV	Ben Hassan Traoré	16	0	16	0
70	MF	(Ghana) GHA	Francis Cann	17	3	15+2	3
81	MF	(Saudi Arabia) KSA	Ibrahim Al-Barakah	15	0	1+14	0
Forwards
29	FW	(Saudi Arabia) KSA	Battal Al-Harthi	1	0	0+1	0
42	FW	(Saudi Arabia) KSA	Abdulaziz Al-Harbi	1	0	0+1	0
77	FW	(Saudi Arabia) KSA	Sulaiman Al-Saeed	24	2	6+18	2
88	FW	(Saudi Arabia) KSA	Nawaf Al-Beshri	2	1	0+2	1
89	FW	(Saudi Arabia) KSA	Ahmed Al-Shuwayfie	20	3	1+19	3
98	FW	(Cameroon) CMR	Diederrick Joel Tagueu	15	7	14+1	7
Players sent out on loan this season
18	MF	(Saudi Arabia) KSA	Hammad Al-Shaye	0	0	0	0
90	FW	(Saudi Arabia) KSA	Muteb Al-Hammad	4	1	1+3	1
95	MF	(Morocco) MAR	Nawfel Zerhouni	13	1	12+1	1
Player who made an appearance this season but have left the club
8	MF	(Serbia) SRB	Luka Stojanović	13	1	11+2	1
9	FW	(Niger) NIG	Yousef Omar	2	0	0+2	0
38	MF	(Saudi Arabia) KSA	Bader Al-Johani	0	0	0	0
94	FW	(Brazil) BRA	Uilliam	11	0	8+3	0
99	MF	(Morocco) MAR	Abdelilah Hafidi	8	1	7+1	1

=== Goalscorers ===
Rank	No.	Pos	Nat	Name	FD League	Total
1	11	MF	(Netherlands)	Ola John	18	18
2	7	MF	(Saudi Arabia)	Abdulhadi Al-Harajin	7	7
2	98	FW	(Cameroon)	Diederrick Joel Tagueu	7	7
4	10	MF	(Saudi Arabia)	Thaar Al-Otaibi	3	3
4	70	MF	(Ghana)	Francis Cann	3	3
4	89	FW	(Saudi Arabia)	Ahmed Al-Shuwayfie	3	3
7	77	FW	(Saudi Arabia)	Suleiman Al-Saeed	2	2
8	8	MF	(Serbia)	Luka Stojanović	1	1
8	12	DF	(Saudi Arabia)	Farhan Al-Aazmi	1	1
8	16	MF	(Saudi Arabia)	Basil Al-Sayyali	1	1
8	19	DF	(Saudi Arabia)	Ahmed Al Muhaimeed	1	1
8	20	MF	(Egypt)	Youssef Obama	1	1
8	34	DF	(Saudi Arabia)	Abdulrahman Al-Dakheel	1	1
8	61	DF	(Saudi Arabia)	Radhi Al-Otaibi	1	1
8	88	FW	(Saudi Arabia)	Nawaf Al-Beshri	1	1
8	90	FW	(Saudi Arabia)	Muteb Al-Hammad	1	1
8	95	MF	(Morocco)	Nawfel Zerhouni	1	1
8	99	MF	(Morocco)	Abdelilah Hafidi	1	1
Own goal					1	1
Total					55	55

Last Updated: 29 May 2023

=== Assists ===
Rank	No.	Pos	Nat	Name	FD League	Total
1	11	MF	(Netherlands)	Ola John	14	14
2	7	MF	(Saudi Arabia)	Abdulhadi Al-Harajin	3	3
2	20	MF	(Egypt)	Youssef Obama	3	3
2	99	MF	(Morocco)	Abdelilah Hafidi	3	3
5	61	DF	(Saudi Arabia)	Radhi Al-Otaibi	2	2
5	70	MF	(Ghana)	Francis Cann	2	2
7	2	DF	(Brazil)	Paulo Ricardo	1	1
7	10	MF	(Saudi Arabia)	Thaar Al-Otaibi	1	1
7	12	DF	(Saudi Arabia)	Farhan Al-Aazmi	1	1
7	14	DF	(Saudi Arabia)	Sultan Faqihi	1	1
7	16	MF	(Saudi Arabia)	Basil Al-Sayyali	1	1
7	24	DF	(Saudi Arabia)	Fahad Al-Obaid	1	1
7	77	FW	(Saudi Arabia)	Suleiman Al-Saeed	1	1
Total					34	34

Last Updated: 29 May 2023

=== Clean sheets ===
Rank	No.	Pos	Nat	Name	FD League	Total
1	23	GK	(Saudi Arabia)	Ibrahim Zaid	13	13
2	1	GK	(Saudi Arabia)	Dawod Al Saeed	3	3
Total					15	15

Last Updated: 29 May 2023
