= 2023–24 Al-Ettifaq FC season =

Al-Ettifaq
2023–24 season
- President: Samer Al-Misehal
- Manager: Steven Gerrard
- Stadium: Prince Mohamed bin Fahd Stadium; Al-Ettifaq Club Stadium
- Pro League: 6th
- King Cup: Round of 16 (knocked out by Al-Nassr)
- Top goalscorer: League: Moussa Dembélé (12); All: Moussa Dembélé (14)
- Highest home attendance: 13,930 (vs. Al-Nassr, 14 August 2023)
- Lowest home attendance: 2,281 (vs. Damac, 2 September 2023)
- Average home league attendance: 7,311
Home colours	Away colours	Third colours
- All statistics correct as of 27 May 2024.

The 2023–24 season was Al-Ettifaq's 45th non-consecutive season in the Pro League and their 78th season in existence. In addition to the Pro League, the club also participated in the King Cup.

The season covers the period from 1 July 2023 to 30 June 2024.

== Players ==
=== Squad information ===
As of 1 February 2024

Note: Flags indicate national team as defined under FIFA eligibility rules; some limited exceptions apply. Players may hold more than one non-FIFA nationality.

No.	Pos.	Nation	Player
1	GK	KSA	Abdullah Al-Oaisher
3	DF	KSA	Mohammed Al-Dossari
4	DF	SCO	Jack Hendry
9	FW	FRA	Moussa Dembélé
11	MF	KSA	Ali Hazazi
13	DF	KSA	Hamdan Al-Shamrani
14	MF	ESP	Álvaro Medrán
17	DF	KSA	Meshal Al-Alaeli
19	FW	JAM	Demarai Gray
20	FW	KSA	Thamer Al-Khaibari
21	GK	KSA	Amin Bukhari (on loan from Al-Nassr)
22	GK	KSA	Bilal Al-Dawaa
24	MF	KSA	Abdulrahman Al-Aboud (on loan from Al-Ittihad)
25	MF	NED	Georginio Wijnaldum (captain)

No.	Pos.	Nation	Player
26	MF	KSA	Abdulmohsen Al-Dossari
29	DF	KSA	Mohammed Abdulrahman
30	FW	KSA	Muhannad Al Saad
35	MF	KSA	Abdullah Khalifah
41	MF	KSA	Majed Dawran
48	GK	BRA	Paulo Victor
49	DF	KSA	Abdulrahman Oumar
61	DF	KSA	Radhi Al-Otaibi
70	DF	KSA	Abdullah Al-Khateeb
75	MF	CIV	Seko Fofana (on loan from Al-Nassr)
76	DF	KSA	Abdullah Madu (on loan from Al-Nassr)
77	MF	KSA	Khalid Al-Ghannam
90	FW	KSA	Haroune Camara (on loan from Al-Ittihad)
97	FW	CMR	Karl Toko Ekambi

=== Unregistered players ===
Note: Flags indicate national team as defined under FIFA eligibility rules; some limited exceptions apply. Players may hold more than one non-FIFA nationality.

No.	Pos.	Nation	Player
99	FW	SWE	Robin Quaison

=== Out on loan ===
Note: Flags indicate national team as defined under FIFA eligibility rules; some limited exceptions apply. Players may hold more than one non-FIFA nationality.

No.	Pos.	Nation	Player
5	DF	KSA	Saad Al Mousa (on loan to Al-Ittihad)
6	MF	TUR	Berat Özdemir (on loan to Trabzonspor)
7	MF	KSA	Mohammed Al-Kuwaykibi (on loan to Al Taawoun)
8	MF	KSA	Hamed Al-Ghamdi (on loan to Al-Ittihad)
15	MF	KSA	Ahmed Al-Ghamdi (on loan to Al-Ittihad)
18	MF	KSA	Mohammed Mahzari (on loan to Al Taawoun)

No.	Pos.	Nation	Player
23	FW	KSA	Jaber Qarradi (on loan to Ohod)
24	MF	KSA	Nawaf Hazazi (on loan to Al-Bukiryah)
27	FW	BRA	Vitinho (on loan to Al-Shabab)
32	DF	COD	Marcel Tisserand (on loan to Abha Club)
42	MF	KSA	Salem Al-Maqadi (on loan to Jeddah)
92	GK	KSA	Turki Baljoush (on loan to Al-Nairyah)

== Transfers and loans ==
=== Transfers in ===
Entry date	Position	No.	Player	From club	Fee	Ref.
30 June 2023	DF	29	(Saudi Arabia) Fahad Al-Dossari	(Saudi Arabia) Al-Kholood	End of loan	
30 June 2023	MF	18	(Saudi Arabia) Mohammed Mahrazi	(Saudi Arabia) Al-Shoulla	End of loan	
30 June 2023	MF	42	(Saudi Arabia) Salem Al-Maqadi	(Saudi Arabia) Al-Sahel	End of loan	
30 June 2023	MF	–	(Germany) Amin Younes	(Netherlands) Utrecht	End of loan	
26 July 2023	DF	4	(Scotland) Jack Hendry	(Belgium) Club Brugge	$5,400,000	
26 July 2023	FW	9	(France) Moussa Dembélé	(France) Lyon	Free	
27 July 2023	MF	10	(England) Jordan Henderson	(England) Liverpool	$15,500,000	
2 September 2023	MF	25	(Netherlands) Georginio Wijnaldum	(France) Paris Saint-Germain	$8,600,000	
7 September 2023	DF	61	(Saudi Arabia) Radhi Al-Otaibi	(Saudi Arabia) Al-Hazem	Undisclosed	
7 September 2023	FW	19	(Jamaica) Demarai Gray	(England) Everton	$10,000,000	
7 September 2023	FW	20	(Saudi Arabia) Thamer Al-Khaibari	(Saudi Arabia) Al-Ittihad	Free	
8 September 2023	DF	13	(Saudi Arabia) Hamdan Al-Shamrani	(Saudi Arabia) Al-Ittihad	Free	
26 January 2024	MF	14	(Spain) Álvaro Medrán	(Saudi Arabia) Al-Taawoun	$2,500,000	
30 January 2024	MF	77	(Saudi Arabia) Khalid Al-Ghannam	(Saudi Arabia) Al-Nassr	Undisclosed	
30 January 2024	FW	97	(Cameroon) Karl Toko Ekambi	(Saudi Arabia) Abha	Undisclosed	

=== Loans in ===
Start date	End date	Position	No.	Player	From club	Fee	Ref.
9 August 2023	8 September 2023	DF	13	(Saudi Arabia) Hamdan Al-Shamrani	(Saudi Arabia) Al-Ittihad	None	
7 September 2023	End of season	GK	21	(Saudi Arabia) Amin Bukhari	(Saudi Arabia) Al-Nassr	None	
17 January 2024	End of season	MF	24	(Saudi Arabia) Abdulrahman Al-Aboud	(Saudi Arabia) Al-Ittihad	None	
17 January 2024	End of season	FW	90	(Saudi Arabia) Haroune Camara	(Saudi Arabia) Al-Ittihad	None	
30 January 2024	End of season	DF	76	(Saudi Arabia) Abdullah Madu	(Saudi Arabia) Al-Nassr	None	
30 January 2024	End of season	MF	75	(Ivory Coast) Seko Fofana	(Saudi Arabia) Al-Nassr	None	

=== Transfers out ===
Exit date	Position	No.	Player	To club	Fee	Ref.
30 June 2023	DF	13	(Saudi Arabia) Abdulrahman Al-Obaid	(Saudi Arabia) Al-Hilal	End of loan	
1 July 2023	FW	17	(Saudi Arabia) Abdullah Al-Salem	(Saudi Arabia) Al-Khaleej	Free	
9 July 2023	MF	10	(Tunisia) Naïm Sliti	(Qatar) Al-Ahli Doha	Free	
20 July 2023	FW	20	(Saudi Arabia) Rayan Al-Bloushi	(Saudi Arabia) Al-Safa	Free	
22 July 2023	FW	18	(France) Youssoufou Niakaté	(United Arab Emirates) Baniyas	Free	
3 August 2023	MF	6	(Saudi Arabia) Ibrahim Mahnashi	(Saudi Arabia) Al-Qadsiah	$1,650,000	
13 August 2023	DF	2	(Saudi Arabia) Saeed Al-Muwallad	(Saudi Arabia) Al-Wehda	Free	
31 August 2023	DF	14	(North Macedonia) Darko Velkovski		Released	
1 September 2023	DF	29	(Saudi Arabia) Fahad Al-Dossari	(Saudi Arabia) Al-Orobah	Free	
5 September 2023	DF	44	(Saudi Arabia) Hamad Al-Sayyaf	(Saudi Arabia) Ohod	Free	
7 September 2023	MF	16	(Saudi Arabia) Faisal Al-Ghamdi	(Saudi Arabia) Al-Ittihad	$12,500,000	
7 September 2023	MF	66	(Saudi Arabia) Rakan Kaabi	(Saudi Arabia) Al-Fayha	Free	
8 September 2023	DF	12	(Saudi Arabia) Sanousi Hawsawi	(Saudi Arabia) Damac	$800,000	
12 September 2023	DF	91	(Saudi Arabia) Yasser Al Mousa	(Saudi Arabia) Hajer	Free	
18 January 2024	MF	10	(England) Jordan Henderson	(Netherlands) Ajax	Free	

=== Loans out ===
Start date	End date	Position	No.	Player	To club	Fee	Ref.
1 August 2023	End of season	MF	42	(Saudi Arabia) Salem Al-Maqadi	(Saudi Arabia) Jeddah	None	
4 September 2023	End of season	MF	6	(Turkey) Berat Özdemir	(Turkey) Trabzonspor	None	
5 September 2023	End of season	FW	23	(Saudi Arabia) Jaber Qarradi	(Saudi Arabia) Ohod	None	
9 September 2023	End of season	MF	24	(Saudi Arabia) Nawaf Hazazi	(Saudi Arabia) Al-Bukiryah	None	
17 January 2024	End of season	DF	5	(Saudi Arabia) Saad Al Mousa	(Saudi Arabia) Al-Ittihad	None	
28 January 2024	End of season	MF	15	(Saudi Arabia) Ahmed Al-Ghamdi	(Saudi Arabia) Al-Ittihad	None	
30 January 2024	End of season	DF	32	(Democratic Republic of the Congo) Marcel Tisserand	(Saudi Arabia) Abha	None	
30 January 2024	End of season	MF	8	(Saudi Arabia) Hamed Al-Ghamdi	(Saudi Arabia) Al-Ittihad	None	
30 January 2024	End of season	FW	27	(Brazil) Vitinho	(Saudi Arabia) Al-Shabab	None	
31 January 2024	End of season	MF	7	(Saudi Arabia) Mohammed Al-Kuwaykibi	(Saudi Arabia) Al-Taawoun	None	
31 January 2024	End of season	MF	18	(Saudi Arabia) Mohammed Mahzari	(Saudi Arabia) Al-Taawoun	None	
9 February 2024	End of season	GK	92	(Saudi Arabia) Turki Baljoush	(Saudi Arabia) Al-Nairyah	None	

== Pre-season ==
12 July 2023 Friendly	Al-Ettifaq (Saudi Arabia)	1–1	(Slovenia) NK Aluminij	Kidričevo, Slovenia
18:30 CEST	Tisserand 43'	Report	Katuša 90'	Stadium: Aluminij Sports Park

15 July 2023 Friendly	Al-Ettifaq (Saudi Arabia)	1–2	(Croatia) NK Varaždin	Varaždin, Croatia
20:00 CEST	Vitinho 88'	Report	Šego 54'; Vukušić 90'	Stadium: Stadion Varteks

20 July 2023 Friendly	Al-Ettifaq (Saudi Arabia)	1–1	(Hungary) ZTE	Zalaegerszeg, Hungary
17:30 CEST	Quaison 19'	Report	Ubochioma 14'	Stadium: ZTE Arena

24 July 2023 Friendly	Al-Ettifaq (Saudi Arabia)	0–1	(Croatia) NK Lokomotiva Zagreb	Sveti Martin na Muri, Croatia
17:00 CEST		Report	Bošković 7'	Stadium: Sveti Martin Stadium

27 July 2023 Friendly	Al-Ettifaq (Saudi Arabia)	4–0	(North Macedonia) Rabotnički	Čakovec, Croatia
16:30 CEST	Quaison 7', 11'; Vitinho 52'; A. Al-Ghamdi 85'	Report		Stadium: Stadion SRC Mladost

5 August 2023 Friendly	Al-Ettifaq (Saudi Arabia)	1–0	(United Arab Emirates) Al Jazira	Abu Dhabi, United Arab Emirates
19:30 UAEST	Al-Kuwaykibi	Report		Stadium: Zayed Sports City Stadium

8 August 2023 Friendly	Al-Ettifaq (Saudi Arabia)	1–0	(United Arab Emirates) Shabab Al Ahli	Dubai, United Arab Emirates
19:30 UAEST	Dembélé 20'	Report		Stadium: Rashid Stadium

== Competitions ==
=== Overview ===
Competition	Record							
Competition	G	W	D	L	GF	GA	GD	Win %
Pro League	34	12	12	10	43	34	+9	35.29
King Cup	2	1	0	1	4	1	+3	50.00
Total	36	13	12	11	47	35	+12	36.11

Updated to match played complete
Source: Competitions

=== Pro League ===
==== League table ====
Pos	Team	Pld	W	D	L	GF	GA	GD	Pts	Qualification or relegation
4	Al-Taawoun	34	16	11	7	51	35	+16	59	Qualification for AFC Champions League Two group stage
5	Al-Ittihad	34	16	6	12	63	54	+9	54	
6	Al-Ettifaq	34	12	12	10	43	34	+9	48	Qualification for the AGCFF Gulf Club Champions League group stage
7	Al-Fateh	34	12	9	13	57	55	+2	45	
8	Al-Shabab	34	12	8	14	45	42	+3	44 (Note: Al-Shabab finished ahead of Al-Fayha on overall goal difference: Al-Shabab +3, Al-Fayha −8 (Al-Fayha 0–1 Al-Shabab, Al-Shabab 2–3 Al-Fayha).)	

Source: SPL
Rules for classification: 1) Points; 2) Head-to-head points; 3) Head-to-head goal difference; 4) Total goal difference; 5) Total goals scored; 6) Fair-play points
(Note: Head-to-head record is used only after all the matches between the teams in question have been played).

==== Results summary ====
Overall								Home						Away					
Pld	W	D	L	GF	GA	GD	Pts	W	D	L	GF	GA	GD	W	D	L	GF	GA	GD
34	12	12	10	43	34	+9	48	6	7	4	22	19	+3	6	5	6	21	15	+6

Last updated: complete.
Source: spl.com.sa

==== Results by round ====
Round	1	2	3	4	5	6	7	8	9	10	11	12	13	14	15	16	17	18	19	20	21	22	23	24	25	26	27	28	29	30	31	32	33	34
Ground	H	A	H	A	H	A	H	A	H	A	A	H	A	H	A	A	H	A	H	A	H	A	H	A	H	A	H	H	A	H	A	H	H	A
Result	W	W	D	L	W	W	W	D	L	L	W	D	D	D	L	D	L	L	D	W	L	W	W	D	D	L	W	D	D	L	W	D	W	L
Position	5	3	4	5	5	5	4	5	7	7	7	7	7	7	7	8	8	9	8	8	8	8	7	6	6	7	6	7	6	8	6	6	6	6

Source: spl.com.sa
A = Away; H = Home; W = Win; D = Draw; L = Loss

==== Matches ====
All times are local, AST (UTC+3).

Win Draw Loss Postponed

14 August 2023 1	Al-Ettifaq	2–1	Al-Nassr	Dammam
21:00	Quaison 47'; Dembélé 53'	Report	Mané 4'	Stadium: Prince Mohamed bin Fahd Stadium; Attendance: 13,930; Referee: Mohammed Al-Hoaish

18 August 2023 2	Al-Hazem	0–2	Al-Ettifaq	Ar Rass
21:00	Al-Dakheel (yellow card) 2'; Ricardo (yellow card) 50'; Al-Mutairi (yellow card) 81'	Report	Quaison 17'; Vitinho 52'	Stadium: Al-Hazem Club Stadium; Attendance: 1,024; Referee: Raed Al-Zahrani

24 August 2023 3	Al-Ettifaq	1–1	Al-Khaleej	Dammam
21:00	Hendry (yellow card) 39'; Henderson (yellow card) 45+5'; Vitinho 50'; A. Hazazi (yellow card) 79'	Report	Rodrigues (yellow card) 19'; Martins 29'	Stadium: Prince Mohamed bin Fahd Stadium; Attendance: 4,200; Referee: Ahmed Al-Rumaikhani

28 August 2023 4	Al-Hilal	2–0	Al-Ettifaq	Riyadh
21:00	Malcom 24'; S. Al-Dawsari 41'; K. Al-Dawsari (yellow card) 90+5'	Report		Stadium: Prince Faisal bin Fahd Stadium; Attendance: 13,656; Referee: Ramon Abatti (Brazil)

2 September 2023 5	Al-Ettifaq	3–1	Damac	Dammam
21:00	Dembélé 13', 23'; Henderson (yellow card) 44'; Al-Shamrani 68'	Report	Nkoudou 7' (pen.); Munshi (yellow card) 68'; Antolić (yellow card) 87'	Stadium: Prince Mohamed bin Fahd Stadium; Attendance: 2,281; Referee: Majed Al-Shamrani

16 September 2023 6	Abha	1–3	Al-Ettifaq	Abha
15:00	Naji (yellow card) 24'; Kamano (yellow card) 57'; Toko Ekambi 90+8' (pen.)	Report	Dembélé 58'; Al-Shamrani (yellow card) 63'; Quaison 75'; H. Al-Ghamdi 82'	Stadium: Prince Sultan bin Abdul Aziz Stadium; Attendance: 976; Referee: Abdulrahman Al-Sultan

21 September 2023 7	Al-Ettifaq	4–3	Al-Tai	Dammam
18:00	Wijnaldum 2', 72'; Al-Shamrani (yellow card) 28'; Dembélé 41', 90+3'; H. Al-Ghamdi (yellow card) 84'; Al-Kuwaykibi (yellow card) 90+1'	Report	Mensah 10', 36', 54', (yellow card) 67'; Semedo (yellow card) 45+3'	Stadium: Prince Mohamed bin Fahd Stadium; Attendance: 4,865; Referee: Mamdouh Al Shahdan

30 September 2023 8	Al-Ahli	0–0	Al-Ettifaq	Jeddah
21:00	Al-Majhad (yellow card) 41'	Report	Al-Khateeb (yellow card) 28'	Stadium: Prince Abdullah Al Faisal Stadium; Attendance: 14,045; Referee: Irfan Peljto (Bosnia and Herzegovina)

5 October 2023 9	Al-Ettifaq	1–2	Al-Fateh	Dammam
21:00	Dembélé 64', (yellow card) 90+4'; Gray (yellow card) 90+9'	Report	Zelarayán 85'; Djaniny 90+3'; Al-Zubaidi (yellow card) 90+12'	Stadium: Prince Mohamed bin Fahd Stadium; Attendance: 9,827; Referee: Abdulsamad Bakri

22 October 2023 10	Al-Riyadh	1–0	Al-Ettifaq	Riyadh
18:00	Touré (yellow card) 7'; Al-Aqel (yellow card) 10'; Al-Shuwayyi 18'; Ndong (yellow card) 41'; Campaña (yellow card) 67'	Report	Gray (yellow card) 45+2'	Stadium: Prince Faisal bin Fahd Stadium; Attendance: 696; Referee: Ahmed Al-Rumaikhani

28 October 2023 11	Al-Wehda	2–3	Al-Ettifaq	Mecca
21:00	Goodwin 37', 51'; Al-Eisa (yellow card) 54' van Crooij (yellow card) 90+1'; Bukhari (yellow card) 90+4'	Report	Wijnaldum 18', 81'; Henderson (yellow card) 58'; Gray 90+8'; Hendry (yellow card) 90+10'	Stadium: King Abdul Aziz Stadium; Attendance: 1,188; Referee: Khaled Al-Teris

4 November 2023 12	Al-Ettifaq	0–0	Al-Raed	Dammam
21:00	Abdulrahman (yellow card) 32'; Henderson (yellow card) 55'; Al-Khateeb (yellow card) 85'	Report	Fouzair (yellow card) 10'; Al-Jayzani (yellow card) 71'; Hazazi (yellow card) 90+5'; F. Al-Ghamdi (yellow card) 90+6'	Stadium: Al-Ettifaq Club Stadium; Attendance: 12,356; Referee: Majed Al-Shamrani

11 November 2023 13	Al-Fayha	0–0	Al-Ettifaq	Al Majma'ah
18:00	Al-Khalaf (yellow card) 56'	Report	Hazazi (yellow card) 88'; Tisserand (yellow card) 90+3'	Stadium: Al Majma'ah Sports City; Attendance: 610; Referee: Shukri Al-Hanfoush

24 November 2023 14	Al-Ettifaq	1–1	Al-Ittihad	Dammam
18:00	Wijnaldum 41'	Report	Hamdallah 54'; Felipe (yellow card) 73'	Stadium: Al-Ettifaq Club Stadium; Attendance: 12,334; Referee: Tamás Bognár (Hungary)

1 December 2023 15	Al-Okhdood	1–0	Al-Ettifaq	Najran
18:00	Al-Harthi (yellow card) 5'; Tănase (yellow card) 37'; Burcă 73'	Report	Abdulrahman (yellow card) 56'	Stadium: Prince Hathloul bin Abdul Aziz Sports City; Attendance: 908; Referee: Andris Treimanis (Latvia)

7 December 2023 16	Al-Shabab	0–0	Al-Ettifaq	Riyadh
21:00	Al-Qahtani (yellow card) 7'; Santos (yellow card) 12'; Banega (red card) 66'; Cuéllar (red card) 85'	Report	Gray (red card) 85'	Stadium: Al-Shabab Club Stadium; Attendance: 8,037; Referee: Fernando Rapallini (Argentina)

16 December 2023 17	Al-Ettifaq	0–2	Al-Taawoun	Dammam
21:00	Abdulrahman (yellow card) 90+1'	Report	El Mahdioui 41' (pen.); Pedro (yellow card) 55'; Castro 63'	Stadium: Prince Mohamed bin Fahd Stadium; Attendance: 5,083; Referee: Shukri Al-Hanfoush

22 December 2023 18	Al-Nassr	3–1	Al-Ettifaq	Riyadh
21:00	Telles 43'; Laporte (yellow card) 45+5'; Brozović 59'; Ronaldo 73' (pen.)	Report	Dembélé (yellow card) 36'; Tisserand (yellow card) 84'; Al-Kuwaykibi 85'	Stadium: Al-Awwal Park; Attendance: 23,774; Referee: Khaled Al-Teris

28 December 2023 19	Al-Ettifaq	1–1	Al-Hazem	Dammam
18:00	Gray 70'	Report	Viana (yellow card) 83'; Tozé 90+1' (pen.)	Stadium: Prince Mohamed bin Fahd Stadium; Attendance: 5,808; Referee: Abdullah Al-Harbi

15 February 2024 20	Al-Khaleej	0–2	Al-Ettifaq	Dammam
20:00	Adams (yellow card) 59'	Report	Wijnaldum 49'; Gray 61'; Al-Shamrani (yellow card) 67'; Al-Khateeb (yellow card) 90+3'	Stadium: Prince Mohamed bin Fahd Stadium; Attendance: 4,324; Referee: Abdullah Al-Kharboush

26 February 2024 21	Al-Ettifaq	0–2	Al-Hilal	Dammam
17:00	Toko Ekambi (yellow card) 42'; Al-Shamrani (yellow card) 64'	Report	Milinković-Savić 39'; Mitrović (yellow card) 45+3'; S. Al-Dawsari 45+5'; Neves (yellow card) 52'; Koulibaly (yellow card) 56'	Stadium: Al-Ettifaq Club Stadium; Attendance: 12,247; Referee: Fabio Maresca (Italy)

2 March 2024 22	Damac	0–2	Al-Ettifaq	Khamis Mushait
17:00	Zeghba (red card) 23'	Report	Gray 16'; Dembélé 45+6' (pen.)	Stadium: Damac Club Stadium; Attendance: 2,974; Referee: Mohammed Al-Hoaish

9 March 2024 23	Al-Ettifaq	3–0	Abha	Dammam
17:00	Krychowiak 54' (o.g.); Toko Ekambi 73'; Dembélé 89'	Report	Krychowiak (yellow card) 51'; Al-Ali (yellow card) 65'	Stadium: Al-Ettifaq Club Stadium; Attendance: 7,802; Referee: Mohammed Abu Shaqarah

15 March 2024 24	Al-Tai	1–1	Al-Ettifaq	Ha'il
22:00	Misidjan 45+4'; Al-Shamlan (yellow card) 58'; Al-Nakhli (yellow card) 82'	Report	Toko Ekambi 18'; Fofana (yellow card) 40'; Hendry (yellow card) 54'; Al-Shamrani (yellow card) 75'; Gray (red card) 90+7'	Stadium: Prince Abdul Aziz bin Musa'ed Stadium; Attendance: 7,149; Referee: Khaled Al-Teris

29 March 2024 25	Al-Ettifaq	2–2	Al-Ahli	Dammam
22:00	Fofana 45+3'; Al-Buraikan 49' (o.g.); Dembélé (yellow card) 60'; Al-Ghannam (yellow card) 68'; Al-Khateeb (yellow card) 88'	Report	Al-Buraikan 8'; Al-Asmari (yellow card) 30'; Al-Ammar 88'; Al-Nabit (yellow card) 88'	Stadium: Al-Ettifaq Club Stadium; Attendance: 11,454; Referee: Faisal Al-Blwi

3 April 2024 26	Al-Fateh	1–0	Al-Ettifaq	Al-Hasa
22:00	Baattia (yellow card) 63'; Zelarayán 80', (yellow card) 83'	Report		Stadium: Al-Fateh Club Stadium; Attendance: 8,327; Referee: Sultan Al-Harbi

6 April 2024 27	Al-Ettifaq	1–0	Al-Riyadh	Dammam
22:00	Toko Ekambi 11'; Medrán (yellow card) 68'; Abdulrahman (yellow card) 90'	Report	Al-Shuwayyi (yellow card) 28'; Al-Shuwayrikh (yellow card) 89'	Stadium: Al-Ettifaq Club Stadium; Attendance: 3,573; Referee: Majed Al-Shamrani

20 April 2024 28	Al-Ettifaq	0–0	Al-Wehda	Dammam
21:00		Report		Stadium: Al-Ettifaq Club Stadium; Attendance: 3,070; Referee: Abdulsamad Bakri

27 April 2024 29	Al-Raed	2–2	Al-Ettifaq	Buraidah
18:00	El Berkaoui 10'; Al-Fahad (yellow card) 63'; Gonzalez (yellow card) 69'; Normann 90+6'	Report	Al-Otaibi (yellow card) 3'; Gray (yellow card) 68'; Dembélé 71'; Al-Aboud (yellow card) 86'; Camara 90+2'	Stadium: Al-Raed Club Stadium; Attendance: 2,712; Referee: Abdulrahman Al-Sultan

3 May 2024 30	Al-Ettifaq	1–2	Al-Fayha	Dammam
21:00	Fofana (yellow card) 6'; Al-Otaibi (yellow card) 58'; Al-Shamrani (yellow card) 68'; Dembélé 81'	Report	Al-Safri (yellow card) 57'; Sakala 72', 85'	Stadium: Al-Ettifaq Club Stadium; Attendance: 4,576; Referee: Fareeh Al-Jaloud

10 May 2024 31	Al-Ittihad	0–5	Al-Ettifaq	Jeddah
21:00		Report	Fofana 5'; Dembélé 31' (pen.); Toko Ekambi 35', 39', 55'; Abdulrahman (yellow card) 53'	Stadium: King Abdullah Sports City; Attendance: 13,214; Referee: Sultan Al-Harbi

17 May 2024 32	Al-Ettifaq	1–1	Al-Okhdood	Dammam
21:00	Abdulrahman (red card) 16'; Dawran 86'	Report	Al Mansour (yellow card) 39'; Al-Zubaidi 48'; Al-Habib (yellow card) 79'	Stadium: Al-Ettifaq Club Stadium; Attendance: 4,826; Referee: Khaled Al-Teris

23 May 2024 33	Al-Ettifaq	1–0	Al-Shabab	Dammam
21:00	Medrán 38'; Wijnaldum (yellow card) 90+15'	Report	Saïss (yellow card) 71'; Al-Harbi (yellow card) 90+3'; Santos (yellow card) 90+5'	Stadium: Al-Ettifaq Club Stadium; Attendance: 6,049; Referee: Ahmed Al-Rumaikhani

27 May 2024 34	Al-Taawoun	1–0	Al-Ettifaq	Buraidah
21:00	El Mahdioui (yellow card) 45+7'; Al-Oyayari 90', (yellow card) 90+1'	Report	Hazazi (yellow card) 45+5'; Al-Otaibi (yellow card) 75'	Stadium: Al-Taawoun Club Stadium; Attendance: 4,591; Referee: Mohammed Al-Hoaish

=== King Cup ===
All times are local, AST (UTC+3).

24 September 2023 Round of 32	Al-Ettifaq	4–0	Jeddah	Dammam
18:00	Wijnaldum 26'; Dembélé 38', 45'; Al-Kuwaykibi 59'	Report		Stadium: Prince Mohamed bin Fahd Stadium; Referee: Shukri Al-Hanfoush

31 October 2023 Round of 16	Al-Nassr	1–0 (a.e.t.)	Al-Ettifaq	Riyadh
17:45	Ronaldo (yellow card) 13'; Talisca (red card) 45+11'; Mané 107'; Otávio (yellow card) 116'	Report	H. Al-Ghamdi (yellow card) 67'; Al-Shamrani (yellow card) 70'; Abdulrahman (yellow card) 77'; Hazazi (red card) 89'	Stadium: Al-Awwal Park; Attendance: 18,341; Referee: Piero Maza (Chile)

== Statistics ==
=== Appearances ===
Last updated on 27 May 2024.

No.	Pos	Nat	Player	Total		Pro League		King Cup	
No.	Pos	Nat	Player	Apps	Goals	Apps	Goals	Apps	Goals
Goalkeepers
1	GK	(Saudi Arabia) KSA	Abdullah Al-Oaisher	0	0	0	0	0	0
21	GK	(Saudi Arabia) KSA	Amin Bukhari	1	0	0	0	0+1	0
48	GK	(Brazil) BRA	Paulo Victor	36	0	34	0	2	0
Defenders
3	DF	(Saudi Arabia) KSA	Mohammed Al-Dossari	5	0	1+4	0	0	0
4	DF	(Scotland) SCO	Jack Hendry	36	0	34	0	2	0
13	DF	(Saudi Arabia) KSA	Hamdan Al-Shamrani	26	1	19+6	1	1	0
17	DF	(Saudi Arabia) KSA	Meshal Al-Alaeli	1	0	0+1	0	0	0
29	DF	(Saudi Arabia) KSA	Mohammed Abdulrahman	28	0	17+9	0	2	0
42	DF	(Saudi Arabia) KSA	Hassan Al-Musallam	0	0	0	0	0	0
61	DF	(Saudi Arabia) KSA	Radhi Al-Otaibi	26	0	19+7	0	0	0
70	DF	(Saudi Arabia) KSA	Abdullah Al-Khateeb	31	0	20+10	0	1	0
76	DF	(Saudi Arabia) KSA	Abdullah Madu	12	0	12	0	0	0
Midfielders
11	MF	(Saudi Arabia) KSA	Ali Hazazi	26	0	20+4	0	2	0
14	MF	(Spain) ESP	Álvaro Medrán	15	1	15	1	0	0
24	MF	(Saudi Arabia) KSA	Abdulrahman Al-Aboud	7	0	1+6	0	0	0
25	MF	(Netherlands) NED	Georginio Wijnaldum	31	7	29	6	2	1
26	MF	(Saudi Arabia) KSA	Abdulmohsen Al-Dossari	0	0	0	0	0	0
30	MF	(Saudi Arabia) KSA	Muhannad Al Saad	5	0	0+3	0	0+2	0
35	MF	(Saudi Arabia) KSA	Abdullah Khalifah	0	0	0	0	0	0
41	MF	(Saudi Arabia) KSA	Majed Dawran	8	1	1+7	1	0	0
75	MF	(Ivory Coast) CIV	Seko Fofana	14	2	13+1	2	0	0
77	MF	(Saudi Arabia) KSA	Khalid Al-Ghannam	6	0	0+6	0	0	0
Forwards
9	FW	(France) FRA	Moussa Dembélé	26	14	24+1	12	1	2
19	FW	(Jamaica) JAM	Demarai Gray	25	4	21+2	4	1+1	0
20	FW	(Saudi Arabia) KSA	Thamer Al-Khaibari	7	0	0+7	0	0	0
90	FW	(Saudi Arabia) KSA	Haroune Camara	9	1	4+5	1	0	0
97	FW	(Cameroon) CMR	Karl Toko Ekambi	15	6	15	6	0	0
Players sent out on loan this season
5	DF	(Saudi Arabia) KSA	Saad Al Mousa	2	0	0+1	0	0+1	0
6	MF	(Turkey) TUR	Berat Özdemir	4	0	3+1	0	0	0
7	MF	(Saudi Arabia) KSA	Mohammed Al-Kuwaykibi	18	2	7+9	1	2	1
8	MF	(Saudi Arabia) KSA	Hamed Al-Ghamdi	15	1	3+10	1	2	0
15	MF	(Saudi Arabia) KSA	Ahmed Al-Ghamdi	12	0	2+9	0	0+1	0
18	MF	(Saudi Arabia) KSA	Mohammed Mahzari	13	0	2+9	0	0+2	0
23	FW	(Saudi Arabia) KSA	Jaber Qarradi	0	0	0	0	0	0
27	MF	(Brazil) BRA	Vitinho	4	2	3+1	2	0	0
32	DF	(Democratic Republic of the Congo) COD	Marcel Tisserand	17	0	15	0	1+1	0
Player who made an appearance this season but have left the club
10	MF	(England) ENG	Jordan Henderson	19	0	17	0	2	0
12	DF	(Saudi Arabia) KSA	Sanousi Hawsawi	4	0	3+1	0	0	0
16	MF	(Saudi Arabia) KSA	Faisal Al-Ghamdi	5	0	4+1	0	0	0
99	FW	(Sweden) SWE	Robin Quaison	19	3	16+2	3	1	0

=== Goalscorers ===
Rank	No.	Pos	Nat	Name	Pro League	King Cup	Total
1	9	FW	(France)	Moussa Dembélé	12	2	14
2	25	MF	(Netherlands)	Georginio Wijnaldum	6	1	7
3	97	FW	(Cameroon)	Karl Toko Ekambi	6	0	6
4	19	FW	(Jamaica)	Demarai Gray	4	0	4
5	99	FW	(Sweden)	Robin Quaison	3	0	3
6	7	MF	(Saudi Arabia)	Mohammed Al-Kuwaykibi	1	1	2
6	27	MF	(Brazil)	Vitinho	2	0	2
6	75	MF	(Ivory Coast)	Seko Fofana	2	0	2
9	8	MF	(Saudi Arabia)	Hamed Al-Ghamdi	1	0	1
9	13	DF	(Saudi Arabia)	Hamdan Al-Shamrani	1	0	1
9	14	MF	(Spain)	Álvaro Medrán	1	0	1
9	41	MF	(Saudi Arabia)	Majed Dawran	1	0	1
9	90	FW	(Saudi Arabia)	Haroune Camara	1	0	1
Own goal					2	0	2
Total					43	4	47

Last Updated: 23 May 2024

=== Assists ===
Rank	No.	Pos	Nat	Name	Pro League	King Cup	Total
1	25	MF	(Netherlands)	Georginio Wijnaldum	5	1	6
2	10	MF	(England)	Jordan Henderson	4	1	5
3	19	FW	(Jamaica)	Demarai Gray	3	0	3
4	7	MF	(Saudi Arabia)	Mohammed Al-Kuwaykibi	1	1	2
4	8	MF	(Saudi Arabia)	Hamed Al-Ghamdi	2	0	2
4	14	MF	(Spain)	Álvaro Medrán	2	0	2
4	29	DF	(Saudi Arabia)	Mohammed Abdulrahman	1	1	2
4	75	MF	(Ivory Coast)	Seko Fofana	2	0	2
9	4	DF	(Scotland)	Jack Hendry	1	0	1
9	9	FW	(France)	Moussa Dembélé	1	0	1
9	11	MF	(Saudi Arabia)	Ali Hazazi	1	0	1
9	13	DF	(Saudi Arabia)	Hamdan Al-Shamrani	1	0	1
9	27	MF	(Brazil)	Vitinho	1	0	1
9	61	DF	(Saudi Arabia)	Radhi Al-Otaibi	1	0	1
9	90	FW	(Saudi Arabia)	Haroune Camara	1	0	1
9	97	FW	(Cameroon)	Karl Toko Ekambi	1	0	1
Total					28	4	32

Last Updated: 23 May 2024

=== Clean sheets ===
Rank	No.	Pos	Nat	Name	Pro League	King Cup	Total
1	48	GK	(Brazil)	Paulo Victor	12	1	13
2	21	GK	(Saudi Arabia)	Amin Bukhari	0	1	1
Total					12	1	13

Last Updated: 23 May 2024
