= Tozé (footballer, born 1993) =

Portuguese footballer

Personal information
- Full name: António José Pinheiro de Carvalho
- Date of birth: 14 January 1993 (age 33)
- Place of birth: Forjães, Portugal
- Height: 1.74 m (5 ft 9 in)
- Position: Midfielder

Youth career
- 2004–2006: Forjães
- 2007–2012: Porto
- 2008–2009: → Padroense (loan)

Senior career*
Years	Team	Apps	(Gls)
2012–2014	Porto B	75	(28)
2013–2015	Porto	2	(0)
2014–2015	→ Estoril (loan)	28	(5)
2015–2019	Vitória Guimarães	55	(9)
2016	Vitória Guimarães B	4	(2)
2017–2018	→ Moreirense (loan)	26	(8)
2019–2023	Al-Nasr	95	(28)
2023–2024	Al-Hazem	34	(9)
2024–2026	Al-Riyadh	65	(14)

International career
2008	Portugal U15	3	(0)
2008–2009	Portugal U16	6	(1)
2009–2010	Portugal U17	4	(1)
2010–2011	Portugal U18	6	(1)
2011–2012	Portugal U19	16	(4)
2012–2013	Portugal U20	18	(2)
2013–2015	Portugal U21	12	(0)
Medal record
Men's football
Representing Portugal
UEFA European Under-21 Championship
Runner-up	2015 Czech Republic
- * Club domestic league appearances and goals as of 12:12, 8 October 2026 (UTC)

António José Pinheiro de Carvalho (born 14 January 1993), known as Tozé, is a Portuguese professional footballer who plays as a midfielder.

== Club career ==
Born in Forjães, Esposende, Tozé had two youth spells with Porto, the latter starting in 2009 and leading to his graduation. He made his senior debut in the 2012–13 season, being a nuclear element for the B team in the Segunda Liga.

On 10 February 2013, shortly after celebrating his 20th birthday, Tozé made his first official appearance for the main squad, coming on as a second-half substitute for Silvestre Varela in a 1–1 home draw against Olhanense in the Primeira Liga. In the 2013–14 campaign, as the reserves came second in their league, he was runner-up in the scoring charts with one goal fewer than Jorge Pires' 22.

Tozé was loaned to fellow top-flight club Estoril for 2014–15. He scored a penalty against Porto to put his team 2–1 ahead in a league fixture on 9 November, in an eventual 2–2 home draw; right after the match, he was confronted in the stadium's tunnel by Porto staff members who accused him of lack of professionalism for scoring the penalty.

After leaving the Estádio do Dragão in the summer of 2015, Tozé signed a four-year deal with Vitória de Guimarães also of the Portuguese top tier. Ahead of 2017–18, he joined Moreirense in a season-long loan.

On 25 August 2018, both Tozé and André André contributed one goal each to help defeat their 3–2 former side Porto away after being down 2–0. The following June, having decided he would not renew his expiring contract with Vitória, he moved to the UAE Pro League with Al-Nasr.

Tozé scored the winning goal in the final of the UAE League Cup against Shabab Ali Ahli on 17 January 2020, helping his team to win their second title in the competition. In July 2023, he joined Saudi Pro League club Al-Hazem on a free transfer.

On 19 August 2024, Tozé remained in the country and division by agreeing to a contract at Al-Riyadh.

== International career ==
Tozé won 65 caps for Portugal at youth level, including 12 for the under-21s. He participated with them at the 2015 UEFA European Championship, making two substitute appearances for the runners-up in the Czech Republic.

== Personal life ==
In 2011, Tozé was distinguished as the best student in all the public high schools of Porto, receiving an award from mayor Rui Rio. He graduated from Escola António Nobre with a final maximum grade of 20, and subsequently studied veterinary medicine in the Abel Salazar Biomedical Sciences Institute, simultaneously with his football career.

== Career statistics ==
As of match played 21 May 2026

Appearances and goals by club, season and competition
Club	Season	League			National Cup (Note: Appearances in Taça de Portugal and King's Cup)		League Cup (Note: Appearances in Taça da Liga and UAE League Cup)		Continental		Total	
Club	Season	Division	Apps	Goals	Apps	Goals	Apps	Goals	Apps	Goals	Apps	Goals
Porto B	2012–13	Segunda Liga	35	7	—		—		—		35	7
Porto B	2013–14	Segunda Liga	40	21	—		—		—		40	21
Porto B	Total		75	28	—		—		—		75	28
Porto	2012–13	Primeira Liga	1	0	0	0	0	0	0	0	1	0
Porto	2013–14	Primeira Liga	1	0	0	0	0	0	0	0	1	0
Porto	Total		2	0	0	0	0	0	0	0	2	0
Estoril (loan)	2014–15	Primeira Liga	28	5	1	1	3	0	5 (Note: Appearances in UEFA Europa League)	1	37	7
Vitória Guimarães	2015–16	Primeira Liga	13	0	0	0	1	0	2	1	16	1
Vitória Guimarães	2016–17	Primeira Liga	11	0	3	0	1	0	0	0	15	0
Vitória Guimarães	2018–19	Primeira Liga	31	9	2	0	1	0	0	0	34	9
Vitória Guimarães	Total		55	9	5	0	3	0	2	1	65	10
Vitória Guimarães B	2015–16	LigaPro	3	2	—		—		—		3	2
Vitória Guimarães B	2016–17	LigaPro	1	0	—		—		—		1	0
Vitória Guimarães B	Total		4	2	—		—		—		4	2
Moreirense (loan)	2017–18	Primeira Liga	26	8	3	1	2	0	—		31	9
Al-Nasr	2019–20	UAE Pro League	19	5	0	0	9	3	—		28	8
Al-Nasr	2020–21	UAE Pro League	25	7	0	0	5	2	—		30	9
Al-Nasr	2021–22	UAE Pro League	26	12	0	0	7	1	—		33	13
Al-Nasr	2022–23	UAE Pro League	25	4	0	0	6	0	—		31	4
Al-Nasr	Total		95	28	0	0	27	6	—		122	34
Al-Hazem	2023–24	Saudi Pro League	34	9	2	0	—		—		36	9
Al-Riyadh	2024–25	Saudi Pro League	32	5	2	0	—		—		34	5
Al-Riyadh	2025–26	Saudi Pro League	33	9	2	0	—		—		35	8
Al-Riyadh	Total		65	14	4	0	—		—		69	14
Career total			384	103	15	2	33	6	7	2	439	113

== Honours ==
Porto

- Primeira Liga: 2012–13

Al-Nasr

- UAE League Cup: 2019–20
