= Radhi Al-Otaibi =

Saudi Arabian footballer (born 1999)

Personal information
- Full name: Radhi Meshal Al-Otaibi
- Date of birth: 18 May 1999 (age 27)
- Place of birth: Mecca, Saudi Arabia
- Height: 1.70 m (5 ft 7 in)
- Position: Right-back

Team information
- Current team: Al-Ettifaq
- Number: 61

Youth career
- Al-Wehda

Senior career*
Years	Team	Apps	(Gls)
2018–2020	Al-Wehda	2	(0)
2020–2021	Ohod	30	(2)
2021–2023	Al-Hazem	34	(1)
2021–2022	→ Al-Qadsiah (loan)	32	(2)
2023–	Al-Ettifaq	87	(0)

International career
2018	Saudi Arabia U20		
- * Club domestic league appearances and goals as of 5 November 2026

Radhi Al-Otaibi (Arabic: راضي العتيبي; born 18 May 1999) is a Saudi Arabian professional footballer who plays as a right-back for Saudi Pro League club Al-Ettifaq.

== Club career ==
Al-Otaibi began his career at the youth team of Al-Wehda. He made his first-team debut on 3 January 2018 in the King Cup match against Al-Nojoom coming on as a substitute in the 110th minute. On 15 July 2019, Al-Otaibi signed his first professional contract with the club. On 27 December 2019, Al-Otaibi made his league debut for Al-Wehda as a substitute in the 1–0 win against Al-Faisaly. In October 2020, Al-Otaibi joined First Division side Ohod. On 3 July 2021, Al-Otaibi joined Al-Hazem on a three-year contract. On 3 September 2021, Al-Otaibi joined Al-Qadsiah on a season-long loan. Al-Otaibi returned to Al-Hazem following the end of his loan spell at Al-Qadsiah. During the 2022–23 season, he made 29 appearances and scored once helping Al-Hazem to a second-place finish and earn promotion to the Pro League. On 7 September 2023, Al-Otaibi joined Al-Ettifaq on a four-year deal. He made his debut on 16 September 2023 by starting in the 3–1 win against Abha.

== Career statistics ==
=== Club ===
As of 5 November 2026.

Club	Season	League			Cup		Continental		Other		Total	
Club	Season	Division	Apps	Goals	Apps	Goals	Apps	Goals	Apps	Goals	Apps	Goals
Al-Wehda	2017–18	First Division	0	0	1	0	–		–		1	0
Al-Wehda	2018–19	SPL	0	0	0	0	–		–		0	0
Al-Wehda	2019–20	SPL	2	0	0	0	–		–		2	0
Al-Wehda	Total		2	0	1	0	0	0	0	0	3	0
Ohod	2020–21	First Division	30	2	–		–		–		30	2
Al-Qadsiah (loan)	2021–22	First Division	32	2	–		–		–		32	2
Al-Hazem	2022–23	First Division	29	1	–		–		–		29	1
Al-Hazem	2023-24	SPL	5	0	0	0	–		–		5	0
Al-Hazem	Total		34	1	0	0	0	0	0	0	34	1
Al-Ettifaq	2023–24	SPL	26	0	0	0	–		–		26	0
Al-Ettifaq	2024–25	SPL	27	0	2	0	5 (Note: Appearances in GFF Gulf Club Champions League)	0	–		34	0
Al-Ettifaq	2025–26	SPL	24	0	1	0	–		–		25	0
Al-Ettifaq	2026–27	SPL	10	0	1	0	1	0	–		11	0
Al-Ettifaq	Total		87	0	4	0	6	0	0	0	97	0
Career total			185	5	5	0	6	0	0	0	196	5
