= Turki Al-Mutairi =

Saudi Arabian footballer (born 2001)

Turki Al-Mutairi تركي المطيري
Personal information
- Full name: Turki Fahad Marjan Al-Mutairi
- Date of birth: 31 May 2001 (age 25)
- Place of birth: Kuwait
- Height: 1.69 m (5 ft 7 in)
- Position: Winger

Team information
- Current team: Al-Tadamon

Youth career
- –2014: Kuwait SC
- 2014–2020: Al-Hilal

Senior career*
Years	Team	Apps	(Gls)
2020–2023	Al-Hilal	0	(0)
2022	→ Al-Kholood (loan)	19	(4)
2022	→ Al-Batin (loan)	0	(0)
2022–2023	→ Al-Taawoun (loan)	16	(1)
2023–2025	Al-Hazem	23	(3)
2024	→ Al-Orobah (loan)	10	(1)
2025–	Al-Tadamon	0	(0)

International career
2022–2024	Saudi Arabia U23		
Medal record
Men's football
Representing Saudi Arabia
Islamic Solidarity Games
Silver medal – second place	2021 Konya
- * Club domestic league appearances and goals as of 1 June 2023

Turki Fahad Marjan Al-Mutairi (Arabic: تركي المطيري; born 31 May 2001), is a professional footballer who plays as a winger for Kuwaiti club Al-Tadamon.

== Career ==
Al-Mutairi started his career at the youth teams of Al-Hilal. He made his first-team debut on 20 September 2020 in the AFC Champions League match against Shahr Khodro. On 4 January 2022, Al-Mutairi joined First Division side Al-Kholood on loan. On 20 July 2022, Al-Mutairi joined Pro League side Al-Batin on loan. After Al-Batin failed to register him in the squad, Al-Hilal decided to end his loan. On 27 August 2022, Al-Mutairi joined Al-Taawoun on loan. On 29 July 2023, Al-Mutairi joined Al-Hazem on a free transfer. On 31 January 2024, Al-Mutairi joined First Division side Al-Orobah on a six-month loan. On 22 May 2025, Al-Mutairi joined Kuwaiti club Al-Tadamon.

== Career statistics ==
=== Club ===
As of 28 May 2024.

Club	Season	League			Cup		Continental		Other		Total	
Club	Season	Division	Apps	Goals	Apps	Goals	Apps	Goals	Apps	Goals	Apps	Goals
Al-Hilal	2019–20	SPL	0	0	0	0	1	0	—		1	0
Al-Hilal	2020–21	SPL	0	0	0	0	0	0	0	0	0	0
Al-Hilal	Total		0	0	0	0	1	0	0	0	1	0
Al-Kholood (loan)	2021–22	FDL	19	4	—		—		—		19	4
Al-Taawoun (loan)	2022–23	SPL	16	1	0	0	—		—		16	1
Al-Hazem	2023–24	SPL	9	0	1	0	—		—		10	0
Al-Orobah	2023–24	FDL	10	1	0	0	—		—		10	1
Career total			54	6	1	0	1	0	0	0	56	6

== Honours ==
=== International ===
Saudi Arabia U23

- WAFF U-23 Championship: 2022
