= Mohammed Al-Thani =

Saudi Arabian footballer

Mohammed Al-Thani محمد الثاني
Personal information
- Full name: Mohammed Fuad Al-Thani
- Date of birth: 22 January 1997 (age 29)
- Place of birth: Saudi Arabia
- Height: 1.78 m (5 ft 10 in)
- Positions: Winger; right wing-back

Team information
- Current team: Al-Shabab
- Number: 17

Youth career
- –2018: Al-Faisaly

Senior career*
Years	Team	Apps	(Gls)
2018–2020	Al-Faisaly	3	(0)
2020	→ Al-Ittihad (loan)	0	(0)
2020–2023	Ohod	67	(17)
2021–2022	→ Al-Tai (loan)	9	(0)
2023–2025	Al-Hazem	31	(5)
2024–2025	→ Al-Shabab (loan)	26	(2)
2025–2026	Al-Qadsiah	7	(0)
2026–	Al-Shabab	28	(0)
- * Club domestic league appearances and goals as of 30 October 2026

Mohammed Al-Thani (Arabic: محمد الثاني; born 22 January 1997) is a Saudi Arabian professional footballer who plays as a winger or right wing-back for Al-Shabab.

== Career ==
Al-Thani began his career at the youth team of Al-Faisaly. He was part of the U23 squad that won the final edition of the Saudi Olympic League. He signed his first professional contract with the club on 4 February 2019. He made his league debut for Al-Faisaly on 23 February 2019 in the league match against Al-Raed. On 7 January 2020, Al-Thani joined fellow Pro League side Al-Ittihad on a six-month loan. On 28 October 2020, Al-Thani joined Ohod on a free transfer. On 11 July 2021, Al-Thani joined Al-Tai on loan.

On 9 June 2023, Al-Thani joined Al-Hazem on a three-year contract. On 3 September 2024, Al-Thani joined Al-Shabab on a one-year loan.

On 3 March 2025, Al-Thani joined Al-Qadsiah on a four-year deal starting from the 2025–26 season.

On 14 January 2026, Al-Thani joined Al-Shabab on a two-and-a-half year deal.

== Career statistics ==
=== Club ===
As of match played 27 June 2025

Club	Season	League		King Cup		Asia		Other		Total	
Club	Season	Apps	Goals	Apps	Goals	Apps	Goals	Apps	Goals	Apps	Goals
Al-Faisaly	2018–19	3	0	1	0	—		0	0	4	0
Al-Faisaly	2019–20	0	0	0	0	—		—		0	0
Al-Faisaly	Total	3	0	1	0	0	0	0	0	4	0
Al-Ittihad (loan)	2019–20	0	0	0	0	—		0	0	0	0
Ohod	2020–21	34	10	—		—		—		34	10
Ohod	2022–23	33	7	—		—		—		33	7
Ohod	Total	67	17	0	0	0	0	0	0	67	17
Al-Tai (loan)	2021–22	9	0	0	0	—		—		9	0
Al-Hazem	2023–24	30	5	2	1	—		—		32	6
Al-Hazem	2024–25	1	0	0	0	—		—		1	0
Al-Hazem	Total	31	5	2	1	0	0	0	0	33	6
Al-Shabab (loan)	2024–25	26	2	4	0	—		—		30	2
Al-Qadsiah	2025–26	0	0	0	0	—		0	0	0	0
Career totals		136	24	7	1	0	0	0	0	143	25
