= Forjães =

- Civil parish
- Location in Portugal
- Coordinates: 41.607°N 8.741°W
- Country: Portugal
- Region: Norte
- Intermunic. comm.: Cávado
- District: Braga
- Municipality: Esposende

Area
  - Total: 8.30 km^{2} (3.20 sq mi)

Population (2011)
  - Total: 2,767
  - Density: 333/km^{2} (863/sq mi)
- Time zone: UTC+00:00 (WET)
  - Summer (DST): UTC+01:00 (WEST)

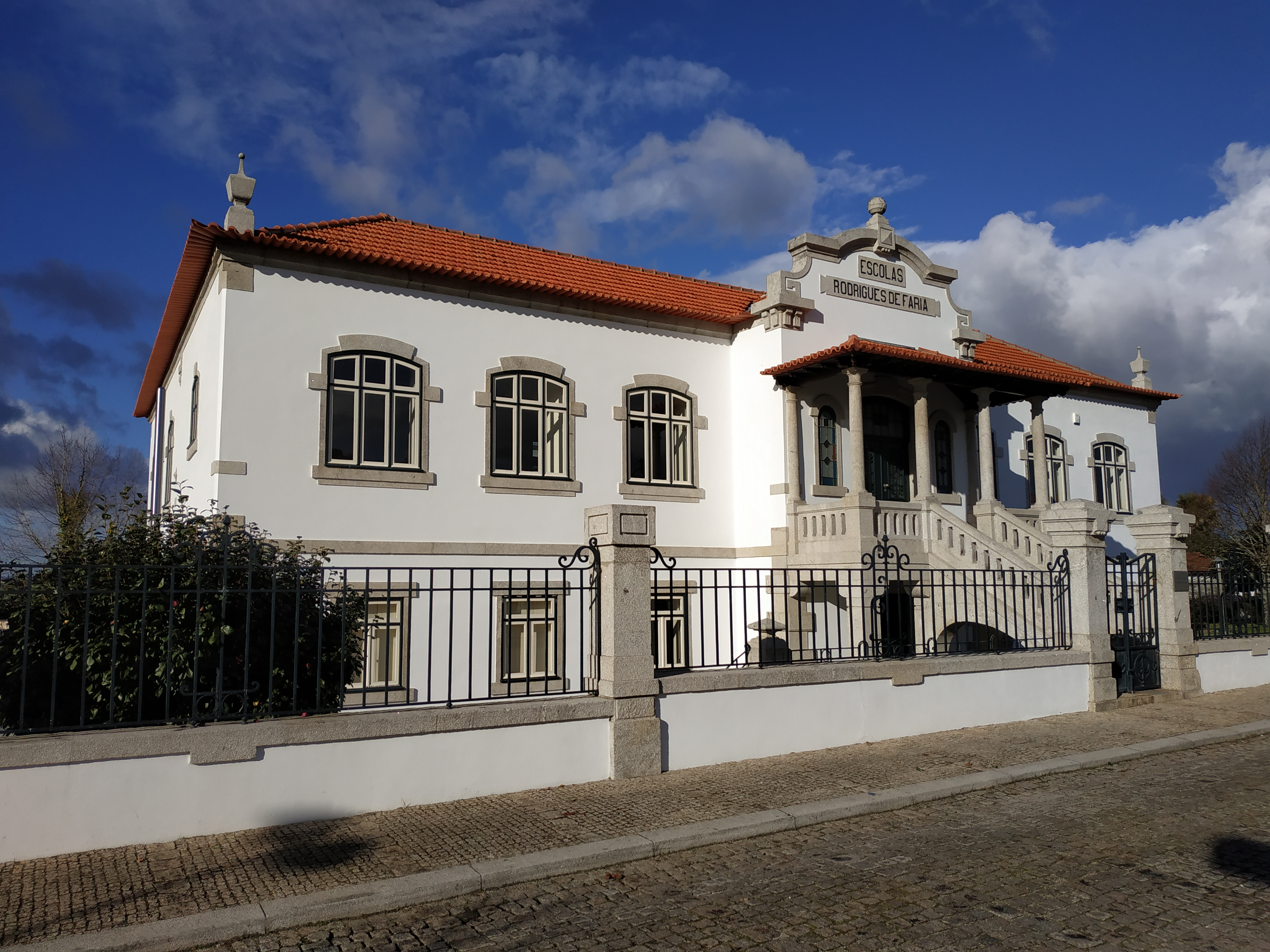
Rodrigues Faria Cultural Center, Forjães, Esposende, Portugal

Forjães is a civil parish in the municipality of Esposende, Portugal. The population in 2011 was 2,767, in an area of 8.30 km^{2} (3.20 sq mi).
