= Francis Cann =

Ghanaian footballer (born 1998)

Personal information
- Full name: Francis Cann
- Date of birth: 6 February 1998 (age 28)
- Place of birth: Tema, Ghana
- Height: 1.57 m (5 ft 2 in)
- Position: Winger

Team information
- Current team: Hokkaido Consadole Sapporo
- Number: 70

Youth career
- –2017: Charity Stars

Senior career*
Years	Team	Apps	(Gls)
2017–2023	Vizela	78	(6)
2018–2019	→ Vitória SC B (loan)	0	(0)
2022	→ Mafra (loan)	15	(2)
2023	→ Al-Hazem (loan)	17	(3)
2023–2024	Marítimo	29	(0)
2024–2026	Hokkaido Consadole Sapporo	0	(0)
- * Club domestic league appearances and goals as of 18 July 2024

Francis Cann (born 7 February 1998) is a Ghanaian professional footballer who plays as a winger for Japanese side HC Sapporo.

== Club career ==
Born in Tema an industrial city in Ghana, Cann started his career in Ghana, playing for lower-tier side Charity Stars FC. In 2017, he secured a deal to F.C. Vizela youth side. He moved through the ranks but was later sent on a one-year loan to Vitoria SC U-23 in 2018–19 league campaign. Upon his return the following season, he played 8 league matches in the 2019–20 Campeonato de Portugal and scored 1 goal to help them gain promotion from the Campeonato de Portugal into the Liga Portugal 2. During the 2020–21 Liga Portugal 2, he appeared in 30 league matches scoring 5 goals as the club placed 2nd and was promoted to the Primeira Liga after a 36-year absence.

In June 2021, ahead of the 2021–22 Primeira Liga, he signed a two-year contract extension deal with the newly promoted side.

On 26 January 2022, Cann officially joined Liga Portugal 2 side Mafra on a loan deal until the end of the season.

On 27 January 2023, Cann joined Saudi First Division League side Al-Hazem on a six-month loan.

On 7 July 2023, Cann signed a two-year contract with Maritimo of Liga Portugal 2.

== International career ==
Cann capped for Ghana at the U-20 level. He was part of the squad in 2016 that failed to qualify for the 2017 Africa U-20 Cup of Nations automatically losing their chances of qualifying for 2017 FIFA U-20 World Cup in South Korea.

== Career statistics ==
As of 19 May 2024

Appearances and goals by club, season and competition
Club	Season	League			Cup		League Cup		Continental		Other		Total	
Club	Season	Division	Apps	Goals	Apps	Goals	Apps	Goals	Apps	Goals	Apps	Goals	Apps	Goals
Vizela	2017–18	Campeonato de Portugal	16	0	3	0	—		—		0	0	19	0
Vizela	2019–20	Campeonato de Portugal	19	1	4	2	—		—		—		23	3
Vizela	2020–21	Liga Portugal 2	30	5	2	0	—		—		—		32	5
Vizela	2021–22	Primeira Liga	10	0	4	0	1	0	—		—		15	0
Vizela	2022–23	Primeira Liga	3	0	0	0	0	0	—		—		3	0
Vizela	Total		78	6	13	2	1	0	—		—		92	8
Vitória SC B (loan)	2018–19	LigaPro	0	0	0	0	—		—		—		19	0
Mafra (loan)	2021–22	Liga Portugal 2	15	2	2	0	—		—		—		17	2
Al-Hazem (loan)	2022–23	Saudi First Division League	17	3	0	0	—		—		—		17	3
Marítimo	2023–24	Liga Portugal 2	29	0	2	0	1	0	—		—		32	0
Career total			139	11	17	2	2	0	0	0	0	0	158	13
