= Basil Al-Sayyali =

Saudi Arabian footballer (born 2001)

Personal information
- Full name: Basil Yousef Al-Sayyali
- Date of birth: 22 June 2001 (age 25)
- Place of birth: Saudi Arabia
- Height: 1.71 m (5 ft 7 in)
- Position: Midfielder

Team information
- Current team: Abha (on loan from Al-Shabab)
- Number: 4

Youth career
- Al-Nassr

Senior career*
Years	Team	Apps	(Gls)
2020–2023	Al-Nassr	0	(0)
2021–2022	→ Al-Tai (loan)	1	(0)
2022–2023	→ Al-Hazem (loan)	25	(1)
2023–2026	Al-Hazem	68	(1)
2026–	Al-Shabab	13	(0)
2026–	→ Abha (loan)	2	(0)

International career
2019–2021	Saudi Arabia U20		
2023–	Saudi Arabia U23		
- * Club domestic league appearances and goals as of 3 September 2026

Basil Al-Sayyali (Arabic: باسل السيالي; born 22 June 2001) is a Saudi Arabian professional footballer who plays as a midfielder for Saudi Pro League club Abha on loan from Al-Shabab.

== Club career ==
Al-Sayyali began his career at the youth team of Al-Nassr. On 2 February 2020, he signed his first professional contract with the club. He was first called up to the first team in April 2021 during the 2021 AFC Champions League group stages. On 7 July 2021, Al-Sayyali joined newly promoted club Al-Tai on loan until the end of the season. He made his debut on 23 September 2021 in the 4–2 win over Al-Ettifaq. His loan was cut short on 21 January 2022 and Al-Sayyali returned to Al-Nassr. On 27 August 2022, Al-Sayyali joined Al-Hazem on loan. On 16 March 2023, Al-Sayyali joined Al-Hazem on a permanent deal, signing a four-year contract. On 20 January 2026, Al-Sayyali joined Al-Shabab.

== International career ==
On 17 March 2023, Al-Sayyali was called up to the Saudi Arabia national under-23 team for the first time. In June 2023, he was part of Saudi Arabia's squad for the 2023 Maurice Revello Tournament in France.
