= Suleiman Al-Saeed =

Saudi Arabian footballer

Personal information
- Full name: Suleiman Saeed Mohammed Al-Lehji
- Date of birth: 8 August 1995 (age 31)
- Place of birth: Saudi Arabia
- Height: 1.77 m (5 ft 10 in)
- Position: Winger

Team information
- Current team: Al-Jabalain
- Number: 77

Youth career
- –2018: Al-Nassr

Senior career*
| Years | Team | Apps | (Gls) |
| 2018–2019 | Al-Sadd | 18 | (2) |
| 2019–2020 | Al-Taqadom | 26 | (2) |
| 2020–2021 | Al-Diriyah | 36 | (8) |
| 2021–2023 | Al-Hazem | 28 | (2) |
| 2022 | → Al-Diriyah (loan) | 20 | (2) |
| 2023–2024 | Al-Jabalain | 32 | (3) |
| 2024–2026 | Al-Diriyah | | |
| 2026– | Al-Jabalain | 1 | (1) |
- * Club domestic league appearances and goals as of 12 August 2021

Suleiman Al-Saeed (Arabic: سليمان السعيد, born 8 August 1995) is a Saudi Arabian professional footballer who plays as a winger for Al-Jabalain.

== Career ==
Al-Saeed started his career at the youth teams of Al-Nassr and was called up to the first team for the first time in November 2015. He left Al-Nassr without making a single appearance in July 2018. On 30 September 2018, Al-Saeed joined Saudi Second Division side Al-Sadd. In August 2019, Al-Saeed left Al-Sadd and joined MS League side Al-Taqadom. He made 26 appearances and scored twice as Al-Taqadom were relegated to the Second Division. On 15 October 2020, Al-Saeed joined MS League side Al-Diriyah. He scored 8 goals in 35 appearances for the club. On 2 July 2021, Al-Saeed joined newly promoted Pro League side Al-Hazem. He made his debut on 12 August 2021 in the 3–3 draw against Al-Taawoun. On 9 January 2022, Al-Saeed joined Al-Diriyah on loan until the end of the season. On 14 June 2023, Al-Saeed joined Al-Jabalain. On 17 July 2024, Al-Saeed rejoined Al-Diriyah on a permanent transfer.
