= Abdulhadi Al-Harajin =

Saudi Arabian footballer

Personal information
- Full name: Abdulhadi Al-Harajin
- Date of birth: October 27, 1994 (age 32)
- Place of birth: Saudi Arabia
- Height: 1.71 m (5 ft 7 in)
- Position: Midfielder

Team information
- Current team: Al-Hazem (on loan from Al-Fayha)
- Number: 8

Senior career*
Years	Team	Apps	(Gls)
2013–2018	Hajer		
2018–2019	Al-Jabalain	26	(1)
2019–2020	Al-Khaleej	34	(10)
2020–2023	Al-Hazem	59	(9)
2023–2024	Al-Riyadh	29	(2)
2024–	Al-Fayha	16	(0)
2025–	→ Al-Hazem (loan)	0	(0)
- * Club domestic league appearances and goals as of 31 May 2024

Abdulhadi Al-Harajin (Arabic: عبد الهادي الحراجين; born October 27, 1994) is a Saudi footballer who plays as a midfielder for Al-Hazem on loan from Al-Fayha.

== Career ==
On 5 June 2023, Al-Harajin joined Al-Riyadh on a free transfer.

On 1 July 2024, Al-Harajin joined Al-Fayha on a three-year contract. On 4 September 2025, Al-Harajin joined Al-Hazem on a one-year loan.

== Honours ==
Al-Hazem

- MS League: 2020–21
