= Abdulrahman Al-Dakheel =

Saudi Arabian footballer (born 1996)

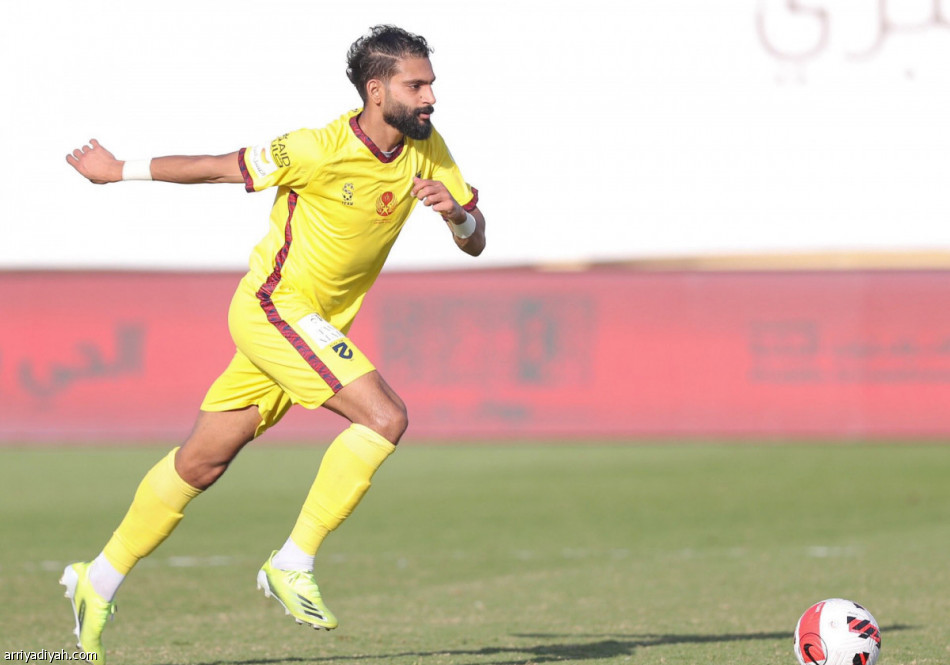

Personal information
- Full name: Abdulrahman Khaled Al-Dakheel
- Date of birth: 26 August 1996 (age 30)
- Place of birth: Unaizah, Saudi Arabia
- Height: 1.86 m (6 ft 1 in)
- Position: Centre-back

Team information
- Current team: Al-Hazem
- Number: 34

Youth career
- Al-Arabi

Senior career*
Years	Team	Apps	(Gls)
2015–2017	Al-Arabi		
2017–	Al-Hazem	88	(1)
2019–2020	→ Al-Taqadom (loan)	34	(2)

International career
2015	Saudi Arabia U23		
- * Club domestic league appearances and goals as of 31 May 2023

Abdulrahman Al-Dakheel (Arabic: عبدالرحمن الدخيل; born 26 August 1996) is a Saudi Arabian professional footballer who plays as a centre-back for Pro League side Al-Hazem.

== Career ==
Al-Dakheel started out his career at hometown club Al-Arabi where he spent two seasons. On 21 July 2017, Al-Dakheel joined Al-Hazem. He spent two seasons at the club without making an appearance before being loaned out to Al-Taqadom for the 2019–20 season. He returned to the club following the end of his loan and made his debut for Al-Hazem on 20 October 2020 against Arar. He made 33 appearances and scored once as Al-Hazem were crowned champions of the MS League.

== Honours ==
Al-Hazem

- MS League: 2020–21
