= Paulo Ricardo (footballer, born 1994) =

Brazilian footballer

Personal information
- Full name: Paulo Ricardo Ferreira
- Date of birth: 13 June 1994 (age 32)
- Place of birth: Laguna, Santa Catarina, Brazil
- Height: 1.89 m (6 ft 2 in)
- Position: Centre-back

Team information
- Current team: Garudayaksa
- Number: 4

Youth career
- 2008–2009: Atlético Catarinense
- 2009: Brusque
- 2009–2012: Figueirense
- 2012–2014: Santos

Senior career*
Years	Team	Apps	(Gls)
2014–2017	Santos	13	(0)
2016–2017	→ Sion (loan)	15	(2)
2016–2017	→ Sion II (loan)	9	(0)
2017–2019	Sion	17	(0)
2018–2019	→ Fluminense (loan)	9	(0)
2019	→ Goiás (loan)	1	(0)
2020–2021	Figueirense	29	(1)
2021–2022	KuPS	37	(2)
2023–2024	Al-Hazem	43	(3)
2024–2025	Al Orooba	6	(0)
2025	KuPS	11	(0)
2026	Persija Jakarta	11	(1)
2026–	Garudayaksa	0	(0)
- * Club domestic league appearances and goals as of 23 May 2026

Paulo Ricardo Ferreira (born 13 June 1994) is a Brazilian professional footballer who plays as a centre-back for Super League club Garudayaksa.

== Club career ==
Born in Laguna, Santa Catarina, Paulo Ricardo joined Santos' youth system in 2012, aged 18, after stints with Atlético Catarinense, Brusque and Figueirense. At the latter he also suffered with recurrent back injuries which included a vertebral fracture.

On 21 March 2014 Paulo Ricardo signed a new deal with Peixe, running until 2017. He made his first team debut on 18 July, coming on as a late substitute in a 2–0 home success against Palmeiras for the Campeonato Brasileiro Série A championship.

On 26 April 2015, after Werley's illness and Gustavo Henrique's injury, Paulo Ricardo was made a starter in 2015 Campeonato Paulista final against Palmeiras, but was sent off after committing a penalty in a 1–0 away loss. He appeared more regularly with the club during the campaign, being sometimes utilized as a defensive midfielder by manager Dorival Júnior.

On 7 July 2016, Paulo Ricardo was loaned to FC Sion for one year. He made his debut for the club on 10 August, starting in a 3–1 away loss against FC Lugano.

On 24 July 2017, Paulo Ricardo joined Sion permanently, with Santos receiving a compensation fee. On 8 August of the following year, he returned to his homeland after agreeing to a one-year loan deal with Fluminense.

In the summer of 2021, he moved to the Finnish club Kuopion Palloseura (KuPS) in the country's top-tier Veikkausliiga. During his time with KuPS, the club won two Finnish Cup titles, and finished twice as the Veikkausliiga runner-up, losing the title to HJK Helsinki with one point difference on both occasions.

On 22 January 2023, Ricardo joined Saudi club Al-Hazem for an undisclosed fee.

On 4 July 2024, Ricardo joined Al-Urooba.

On 14 May 2025, it was announced that Ricardo would return to Finland and KuPS, on a deal for the remainder of the season, starting officially on 1 June.

=== Persija Jakarta ===
In January 2026, Paulo Ricardo officially joined Indonesian Liga 1 club Persija Jakarta. He signed a contract until the end of the 2025–26 season with an option for an extension. The transfer was completed on a free transfer following the expiry of his contract with KuPS. He was brought in to strengthen Persija's back line and was reported to have a market value of approximately €300,000.

== Career statistics ==
As of 23 May 2026

Appearances and goals by club, season and competition
Club	Season	League			State League		National cup (Note: Includes Copa do Brasil, Swiss Cup, Suomen Cup and Saudi King's Cup)		League cup (Note: Includes Copa Verde, Finnish League Cup and UAE League Cup)		Continental		Total	
Club	Season	Division	Apps	Goals	Apps	Goals	Apps	Goals	Apps	Goals	Apps	Goals	Apps	Goals
Santos	2014	Série A	1	0	—		1	0	—		—		2	0
Santos	2015	Série A	11	0	1 (Note: Includes Campeonato Paulista)	0	6	0	—		—		18	0
Santos	2016	Série A	0	0	0	0	0	0	—		0	0	0	0
Santos	Total		12	0	1	0	7	0	—		—		20	0
Sion II (loan)	2016–17	Swiss Promotion League	4	0	—		—		—		—		4	0
Sion	2016–17	Swiss Super League	15	2	—		3	0	—		—		18	2
Sion	2017–18	Swiss Super League	17	0	—		3	0	—		2 (Note: Includes UEFA Europa League)	0	22	0
Sion	Total		36	2	—		5	0	—		2	0	39	2
Fluminense (loan)	2018	Série A	9	0	—		—		—		3 (Note: Appearance(s) in Copa Sudamericana)	0	12	0
Fluminense (loan)	2019	Série A	0	0	0	0	0	0	—		1	0	1	0
Fluminense (loan)	Total		9	0	0	0	0	0	—		4	0	13	0
Goiás (loan)	2019	Série A	1	0	—		—		2	0	—		3	0
Figueirense	2020	Série B	12	1	7 (Note: Includes Campeonato Catarinense)	0	4	0	—		—		23	1
Figueirense	2021	Série C	0	0	11	0	1	0	—		—		12	0
Figueirense	Total		13	1	18	0	5	0	—		—		35	1
KuPS	2021	Veikkausliiga	13	2	—		—		—		1 (Note: Includes UEFA Europa Conference League)	0	14	2
KuPS	2022	Veikkausliiga	24	0	—		5	0	4	0	4	0	37	0
KuPS	Total		37	2	—		5	0	4	0	5	0	51	2
Al-Hazem	2022–23	Saudi First Division	17	0	—		0	0	—		–		17	0
Al-Hazem	2023–24	Saudi Pro League	27	3	—		2	0	—		—		29	3
Al-Hazem	Total		44	3	—		2	0	—		—		46	3
Al-Urooba	2024–25	UAE Pro League	6	0	—		0	0	2	0	—		8	0
KuPS	2025	Veikkausliiga	11	0	—		0	0	6	0	0	0	17	0
Persija Jakarta	2025–26	Super League	11	1	—		—		—		—		11	1
Career total			179	9	19	0	24	0	14	0	11	0	246	9

== Honours ==
Santos

- Campeonato Paulista: 2015

KuPS

- Veikkausliiga runner-up: 2021, 2022
- Finnish Cup: 2021, 2022

Al-Hazem

- Saudi First Division League runner-up: 2022–23

Individual

- Veikkausliiga Defender of the Year: 2022
- Veikkausliiga Team of the Year: 2022
