= 2021–22 Al-Hazem F.C. season =

Al-Hazem
2021–22 season
- President: Salman Al-Malik
- Manager: Hélder (until 27 November); Constantin Gâlcă (from 6 December until 21 February); Roel Coumans (from 1 March)
- Stadium: Al-Hazem Club Stadium
- SPL: 16th (relegated)
- King Cup: Round of 16 (knocked out by Al-Batin)
- Top goalscorer: League: Ola John (8 goals); All: Ola John (8 goals)
- Highest home attendance: 3,940 (vs. Al-Nassr, 23 June 2022)
- Lowest home attendance: 531 (vs. Al-Taawoun, 12 August 2021)
- Average home league attendance: 1,776
- All statistics correct as of 27 June 2022.

The 2021–22 season was Al-Hazem's 65th year in their existence and the first season back in the top flight of Saudi Arabian football after winning the MS League last season. The club participated in the Pro League and the King Cup.

The season covered the period from 1 July 2021 to 30 June 2022.

== Players ==
=== Squad information ===
As of 6 September 2021

Note: Flags indicate national team as defined under FIFA eligibility rules; some limited exceptions apply. Players may hold more than one non-FIFA nationality.

No.	Pos.	Nation	Player
1	GK	KSA	Dawod Al Saeed
3	DF	KSA	Khaled Al-Barakah
4	MF	BRA	Alison
5	MF	KSA	Ahmed Al-Najei
6	MF	KSA	Ahmed Al-Juwaid
7	MF	KSA	Abdulhadi Al-Harajin
8	MF	KSA	Abdulrahman Al-Dhefiri
9	FW	NIG	Yousef Omar
11	MF	NED	Ola John
14	DF	KSA	Sultan Faqihi
15	MF	KSA	Hamad Al-Abdan (on loan from Al-Hilal)
16	MF	KSA	Saud Zidan
17	MF	KSA	Abdulrahman Al-Harthi
20	MF	POR	Tiago Rodrigues
21	MF	MAR	Moha Rharsalla

No.	Pos.	Nation	Player
23	GK	KSA	Ibrahim Zaid
24	DF	KSA	Fahad Al-Obaid
27	DF	BRA	Hueglo Neris (on loan from Al-Wasl)
28	DF	KSA	Abdullah Al-Shammari
30	GK	ALG	Malik Asselah
32	DF	KSA	Masoud Bakheet
33	GK	KSA	Majed Al-Ghamdi
34	DF	KSA	Abdulrahman Al-Dakheel
41	MF	KSA	Thaar Al-Otaibi
66	DF	KSA	Farhan Al-Aazmi
70	DF	KSA	Mohammed Bassas (on loan from Al-Ahli)
77	FW	KSA	Sulaiman Al-Saeed
80	MF	KSA	Abdulelah Al-Shammeri (on loan from Al-Shabab)
99	FW	SWE	Carlos Strandberg

=== Out on loan ===
Note: Flags indicate national team as defined under FIFA eligibility rules; some limited exceptions apply. Players may hold more than one non-FIFA nationality.

No.	Pos.	Nation	Player
10	MF	MLI	Ibrahima Tandia (at Al-Adalah until 30 June 2022)
18	MF	KSA	Hammad Al-Shaye (at Al-Saqer until 30 June 2022)
26	MF	KSA	Ghallab Al-Enezi (at Al-Jabalain until 30 June 2022)

No.	Pos.	Nation	Player
50	DF	KSA	Radhi Al-Otaibi (at Al-Qadsiah until 30 June 2022)
81	MF	KSA	Ibrahim Al-Barakah (at Al-Fayha until 30 June 2022)
91	FW	KSA	Mohammed Al-Dahami (at Al-Najma until 30 June 2022)

== Transfers and loans ==
=== Transfers in ===
Entry date	Position	No.	Player	From club	Fee	Ref.
30 June 2021	DF	6	(Saudi Arabia) Omar Mohammed	(Saudi Arabia) Ohod	End of loan	
30 June 2021	DF	28	(Saudi Arabia) Abdullah Al-Shammeri	(Saudi Arabia) Al-Jabalain	End of loan	
30 June 2021	MF	7	(Saudi Arabia) Ghallab Al-Enezi	(Saudi Arabia) Al-Shoulla	End of loan	
30 June 2021	FW	99	(Sweden) Carlos Strandberg	(Saudi Arabia) Abha	End of loan	
1 July 2021	MF	11	(Netherlands) Ola John	(Netherlands) RKC Waalwijk	Free	
1 July 2021	MF	20	(Portugal) Tiago Rodrigues	(Bulgaria) CSKA Sofia	$1,185,000	
2 July 2021	FW	77	(Saudi Arabia) Sulaiman Al-Saeed	(Saudi Arabia) Al-Diriyah	Free	
3 July 2021	DF	50	(Saudi Arabia) Radhi Al-Otaibi	(Saudi Arabia) Ohod	Free	
8 July 2021	MF	6	(Saudi Arabia) Ahmed Al-Jowayed	(Saudi Arabia) Al-Nojoom	Free	
8 July 2021	MF	16	(Saudi Arabia) Saud Zidan	(Saudi Arabia) Al-Nassr	$800,000	
8 July 2021	FW	90	(Saudi Arabia) Muteb Al-Hammad	(Saudi Arabia) Al-Nassr	Free	
10 July 2021	MF	21	(Morocco) Moha Rharsalla	(Slovakia) Slovan Bratislava	Free	
12 July 2021	MF	81	(Saudi Arabia) Ibrahim Al-Barakah	(Saudi Arabia) Damac	Undisclosed	
15 July 2021	MF	41	(Saudi Arabia) Thaar Al-Otaibi	(Saudi Arabia) Al-Hilal	Free	
16 July 2021	DF	3	(Saudi Arabia) Khaled Al-Barakah	(Saudi Arabia) Al-Ahli	Undisclosed	
15 August 2021	MF	4	(Brazil) Alison	(Brazil) Santos	$1,000,000	
2 January 2022	FW	87	(Saudi Arabia) Mohammad Al-Sahlawi	(Qatar) Muaither	Free	
6 January 2022	FW	95	(Morocco) Naoufel Zerhouni	(Morocco) FUS Rabat	$400,000	
14 January 2022	MF	13	(Morocco) Abdelilah Hafidi	(Morocco) Raja CA	$600,000	
25 January 2022	MF	22	(Serbia) Luka Stojanović	(United States) Chicago Fire	Free	

=== Loans in ===
Start date	End date	Position	No.	Player	From club	Fee	Ref.
8 July 2021	13 January 2022	DF	70	(Saudi Arabia) Mohammed Bassas	(Saudi Arabia) Al-Ahli	None	
27 July 2021	End of season	DF	27	(Brazil) Hueglo Neris	(United Arab Emirates) Al-Wasl	None	
15 August 2021	End of season	MF	80	(Saudi Arabia) Abdulelah Al-Shammeri	(Saudi Arabia) Al-Shabab	None	
17 August 2021	End of season	MF	15	(Saudi Arabia) Hamad Al-Abdan	(Saudi Arabia) Al-Hilal	None	
6 January 2022	End of season	DF	27	(Saudi Arabia) Osama Al-Khalaf	(Saudi Arabia) Al-Nassr	None	
21 January 2022	End of season	FW	19	(Nigeria) Ezekiel Henty	(Slovakia) Slovan Bratislava	None	
26 January 2022	End of season	DF	2	(Saudi Arabia) Abdulrahman Al-Rio	(Saudi Arabia) Damac	None	
30 January 2022	End of season	GK	31	(Saudi Arabia) Habib Al-Wotayan	(Saudi Arabia) Al-Hilal	None	
30 January 2022	End of season	MF	29	(Saudi Arabia) Saleh Al-Harthi	(Saudi Arabia) Al-Okhdood	None	

=== Transfers out ===
Exit date	Position	No.	Player	To club	Fee	Ref.
30 June 2021	DF	3	(Saudi Arabia) Khaled Al-Barakah	(Saudi Arabia) Al-Ahli	End of loan	
30 June 2021	MF	11	(Saudi Arabia) Jehad Al-Zowayed	(Saudi Arabia) Abha	End of loan	
30 June 2021	MF	12	(Saudi Arabia) Essam Al-Muwallad	(Saudi Arabia) Al-Ittihad	End of loan	
30 June 2021	MF	48	(Saudi Arabia) Abdullah Al-Samti	(Saudi Arabia) Damac	End of loan	
30 June 2021	MF	81	(Saudi Arabia) Ibrahim Al-Barakah	(Saudi Arabia) Damac	End of loan	
26 July 2021	MF	88	(Brazil) Muralha	(Saudi Arabia) Al-Qadsiah	Free	
13 August 2021	MF	74	(France) Karim Yoda	(Saudi Arabia) Al-Wehda	Free	
14 August 2021	DF	6	(Saudi Arabia) Omar Mohammed	(Saudi Arabia) Al-Kawkab	Free	
17 August 2021	FW	9	(Guinea) Ousmane Barry	(Saudi Arabia) Al-Wehda	Free	
1 September 2021	MF	24	(Saudi Arabia) Maher Al-Mutairi	(Saudi Arabia) Al-Arabi	Free	
3 September 2021	DF	70	(Saudi Arabia) Ahmed Al-Shamrani	(Saudi Arabia) Al-Ain	Free	
6 September 2021	DF	27	(Saudi Arabia) Abdullah Kanno	(Saudi Arabia) Al-Safa	Free	
11 September 2021	MF	21	(Saudi Arabia) Abdulaziz Al-Nashi	(Saudi Arabia) Al-Sahel	Free	
26 September 2021	GK	22	(Saudi Arabia) Abdullah Abdulhameed	(Saudi Arabia) Tuwaiq	Free	
6 January 2022	FW	99	(Sweden) Carlos Strandberg		Released	
10 January 2022	MF	8	(Saudi Arabia) Abdulrahman Al-Dhefiri	(Saudi Arabia) Al-Orobah	Free	
13 January 2022	DF	32	(Saudi Arabia) Masoud Bakheet	(Saudi Arabia) Ohod	Free	
13 January 2022	DF	70	(Saudi Arabia) Mohammed Bassas	(Saudi Arabia) Al-Ahli	End of loan	
13 January 2022	MF	20	(Portugal) Tiago Rodrigues		Released	
21 January 2022	GK	30	(Algeria) Malik Asselah		Released	
28 January 2022	MF	21	(Morocco) Moha Rharsalla	(Saudi Arabia) Al-Qadsiah	Free	

=== Loans out ===
Start date	End date	Position	No.	Player	To club	Fee	Ref.
16 August 2021	End of season	MF	12	(Saudi Arabia) Ghallab Al-Enezi	(Saudi Arabia) Al-Jabalain	None	
31 August 2021	End of season	MF	81	(Saudi Arabia) Ibrahim Al-Barakah	(Saudi Arabia) Al-Fayha	None	
1 September 2021	End of season	MF	10	(Mali) Ibrahima Tandia	(Saudi Arabia) Al-Adalah	None	
3 September 2021	End of season	DF	50	(Saudi Arabia) Radhi Al-Otaibi	(Saudi Arabia) Al-Qadsiah	None	
3 September 2021	End of season	FW	90	(Saudi Arabia) Muteb Al-Hammad	(Saudi Arabia) Al-Ain	None	
3 September 2021	End of season	FW	91	(Saudi Arabia) Mohammed Al-Dahami	(Saudi Arabia) Al-Najma	None	
15 September 2021	End of season	MF	18	(Saudi Arabia) Hammad Al-Shaye	(Saudi Arabia) Al-Saqer	None	
9 January 2022	End of season	FW	77	(Saudi Arabia) Sulaiman Al-Saeed	(Saudi Arabia) Al-Diriyah	None	
1 February 2022	End of season	GK	33	(Saudi Arabia) Majed Al-Ghamdi	(Saudi Arabia) Al-Jeel	None	

== Pre-season ==
17 July 2021 Friendly	Al-Hazem (Saudi Arabia)	2–2	(Hungary) Győri ETO	Győr, Hungary
18:00 CEST	Strandberg 60'; Al-Harthi 85'	Report	Óvári 76'; Farkas 81'	Stadium: ETO Park

21 July 2021 Friendly	Al-Hazem (Saudi Arabia)	0–0	(Hungary) BFC Siófok	Siófok, Hungary
17:00 CEST		Report		Stadium: Révész Géza utcai Stadion

24 July 2021 Friendly	Al-Hazem (Saudi Arabia)	1–1	(Hungary) Diósgyőri VTK	Budapest, Hungary
17:00 CEST	Al-Harajin 74' (pen.)	Report	Eperjesi 61'	Stadium: Szőnyi úti Stadion

28 July 2021 Friendly	Al-Hazem (Saudi Arabia)	3–0	(Hungary) Lipót SE	Lipót, Hungary
18:00 CEST	Rharsalla 9', 60', 67'	Report		Stadium: Lipót SE Pékség sportkomplexuma

== Competitions ==
=== Overview ===
Competition	Record							
Competition	G	W	D	L	GF	GA	GD	Win %
Pro League	30	4	5	21	23	50	−27	13.33
King Cup	1	0	0	1	0	1	−1	0.00
Total	31	4	5	22	23	51	−28	12.90

Updated to match played 27 June 2022
Source: Competitions

=== Pro League ===
==== League table ====
Pos	Team	Pld	W	D	L	GF	GA	GD	Pts	Qualification or relegation
12	Al-Taawoun	30	7	13	10	43	48	−5	34 (Note: Head-to-head points: Al-Ettifaq 3, Al-Taawoun 3. Head-to-head goal difference: Al-Ettifaq +2, Al-Taawoun –2.)	
13	Al-Batin	30	8	9	13	31	41	−10	33 (Note: Head-to-head points: Al-Batin 4, Al-Faisaly 1.)	
14	Al-Faisaly (R)	30	7	12	11	28	37	−9	33	Relegation to MS League
15	Al-Ahli (R)	30	6	14	10	38	43	−5	32	Relegation to MS League
16	Al-Hazem (R)	30	4	5	21	23	50	−27	17	Relegation to MS League

Source: spl.com
Rules for classification: 1) Points; 2) Head-to-head points; 3) Head-to-head goal difference; 4) Total goal difference; 5) Total goals scored; 6) Fair-play points (Note: Head-to-head record is used only after all the matches between the teams in question have been played).
(R) Relegated

==== Results summary ====
Overall								Home						Away					
Pld	W	D	L	GF	GA	GD	Pts	W	D	L	GF	GA	GD	W	D	L	GF	GA	GD
30	4	5	21	23	50	−27	17	3	4	8	17	23	−6	1	1	13	6	27	−21

Last updated: 27 June 2022.
Source: spl.com.sa

==== Results by round ====
Round	1	2	3	4	5	6	7	8	9	10	11	12	13	14	15	16	17	18	19	20	21	22	23	24	25	26	27	28	29	30
Ground	H	H	A	A	H	A	H	H	A	H	A	H	A	A	H	A	A	H	H	A	H	A	A	H	A	H	A	H	H	A
Result	D	D	L	L	W	W	D	D	L	L	L	L	D	L	L	L	L	W	L	L	L	L	L	L	L	W	L	L	L	L
Position	8	11	13	15	12	8	10	10	11	11	11	15	15	16	16	16	16	16	16	16	16	16	16	16	16	16	16	16	16	16

Updated to match(es) played on 27 June 2022. Source: spl.com.sa
A = Away; H = Home; W = Win; D = Draw; L = Loss

==== Matches ====
All times are local, AST (UTC+3).

Win Draw Loss Postponed

12 August 2021 1	Al-Hazem	3–3	Al-Taawoun	Ar Rass
20:55	Al-Harajin 40'; Strandberg (yellow card) 65'; John 69'; Al-Mousa 87' (o.g.)	Report	Al-Nabit (yellow card) 10'; Tawamba 23', 55'; Kaku 34'; Al-Sobhi (yellow card) 45+6'; Abousaban (yellow card) 66'	Stadium: Al-Hazem Club Stadium; Attendance: 531; Referee: Shukri Al-Hanfoush

19 August 2021 2	Al-Hazem	2–2	Al-Ahli	Ar Rass
19:10	Strandberg 35'; John 39'; Rodrigues (yellow card) 54'	Report	Al-Mogahwi (yellow card) 53'; Hassoun (yellow card) 55'; Alioski 78' (pen.); Paulinho 83'; Hindi (yellow card) 90+4'	Stadium: Al-Hazem Club Stadium; Attendance: 1,077; Referee: Mohammed Al-Esmaiel

25 August 2021 3	Al-Raed	2–0	Al-Hazem	Buraidah
19:05	Al-Ghamdi 45+3'; Al Saeed 47' (o.g.); El Berkaoui (yellow card) 57'; Eduardo (yellow card) 71'	Report	Moha (yellow card) 6'; Al-Dakheel (yellow card) 50'; Al-Aazmi (yellow card) 74'; John (yellow card) 89'	Stadium: King Abdullah Sport City Stadium; Attendance: 1,078; Referee: Abdullah Al-Shehri

12 September 2021 4	Al-Shabab	2–0	Al-Hazem	Riyadh
20:35	Ighalo 3', 87'; Paulinho (red card) 42'	Report	Bakheet (yellow card) 45+3'; Alison (yellow card) 75'	Stadium: Prince Faisal bin Fahd Stadium; Attendance: 5,218; Referee: Khalid Al-Juhani

18 September 2021 5	Al-Hazem	2–0	Abha	Ar Rass
18:45	Al-Najei (yellow card) 28'; Atouchi 36' (o.g.); Alison (yellow card) 41'; Tiago (yellow card) 62'; Asselah (yellow card) 69'; Bakheet (yellow card) 80'; Strandberg (yellow card) 83'; John 87'	Report	Al-Zowayed (yellow card) 38'	Stadium: Al-Hazem Club Stadium; Attendance: 691; Referee: Sami Al-Jires

25 September 2021 6	Al-Fateh	0–1	Al-Hazem	Al-Hasa
18:15		Report	Abdullah S. (yellow card) 40'; Moha 52'	Stadium: Prince Abdullah bin Jalawi Stadium; Attendance: 7,810; Referee: Mohammed Al-Harbi

30 September 2021 7	Al-Hazem	1–1	Al-Hilal	Ar Rass
20:20	Al-Obaid (yellow card) 12'; Moha 73' (pen.); Zidan (yellow card) 86'; Asselah (yellow card) 90+2'; Al-Harajin (yellow card) 90+11'	Report	Vietto (yellow card) 42'; Gomis 57'; Al-Faraj (yellow card) 90+6'	Stadium: Al-Hazem Club Stadium; Attendance: 2,756; Referee: Ahmed Al-Rumaikhani

17 October 2021 8	Al-Hazem	0–0	Al-Faisaly	Ar Rass
18:15	Abdullah S. (yellow card) 32'; Al-Barakah (yellow card) 85'	Report	Al-Qumayzi (yellow card) 34'; Qassem (yellow card) 44'; Rossi (yellow card) 90+5'	Stadium: Al-Hazem Club Stadium; Attendance: 1,092; Referee: Raed Al-Zahrani

22 October 2021 9	Damac	1–0	Al-Hazem	Abha
18:20	Al Haydar (yellow card) 90+2'; Zelaya 90+12'	Report	Al-Dakheel (yellow card) 19'; Neris (yellow card) 66'; Abdullah S. (yellow card) 90+14'	Stadium: Prince Sultan bin Abdul Aziz Stadium; Attendance: 1,802; Referee: Sultan Sughayyir

28 October 2021 10	Al-Hazem	0–1	Al-Ittihad	Ar Rass
18:05	Abdulelah S. (yellow card) 50'; Rodrigues (yellow card) 71'; Al-Obaid (yellow card) 84'; Al-Harajin (yellow card) 90+4'; Al-Dakheel (yellow card) 90+5'	Report	El Ahmadi (yellow card) 34'; Al-Zahrani (yellow card) 42'; Al-Malki (yellow card) 43'; Al-Bishi 59'; Romarinho (yellow card) 66'	Stadium: Al-Hazem Club Stadium; Attendance: 3,260; Referee: Abdullah Al-Shehri

5 November 2021 11	Al-Fayha	1–0	Al-Hazem	Al Majma'ah
17:55	Bamsaud (yellow card) 25'; Tachtsidis (yellow card) 64'; Moutari 73'; Mandash (yellow card) 87'	Report	Al-Obaid (yellow card) 33'; Alison (yellow card) 83'; Al-Harthi (yellow card) 87'	Stadium: Al Majma'ah Sports City; Attendance: 6,122; Referee: Mohammed Al-Qarni

21 November 2021 12	Al-Hazem	0–3	Al-Ettifaq	Ar Rass
15:15		Report	Al-Mowalad (yellow card) 16'; Quaison 45+2'; Azaro 84'; Kiss 87'	Stadium: Al-Hazem Club Stadium; Attendance: 1,632; Referee: Shukri Al-Hanfoush

27 November 2021 13	Al-Batin	0–0	Al-Hazem	Hafar al-Batin
15:00		Report	Al-Juwaid (yellow card) 61'; Neris (yellow card) 67'; Abdullah S. (yellow card) 77'	Stadium: Al-Batin Club Stadium; Attendance: 4,238; Referee: Mohammed Al-Hoaish

26 December 2021 14	Al-Nassr	2–1	Al-Hazem	Riyadh
17:50	K. Al-Ghannam 14'; Al-Hassan (yellow card) 36'; Aboubakar 52'; Al-Khaibari (yellow card) 81'; Masharipov (yellow card) 88'	Report	Alison (yellow card) 45+2'; Zidan (yellow card) 51'; Rodrigues 57'; Al-Dakheel (yellow card) 80'; Al-Juwaid (yellow card) 87'	Stadium: Mrsool Park; Attendance: 5,277; Referee: Ivan Kružliak (Slovakia)

31 December 2021 15	Al-Hazem	0–1	Al-Tai	Ar Rass
15:30	Zidan (yellow card) 24'; Al-Juwaid (yellow card) 56'	Report	Al-Jubairi (yellow card) 70'; Dener (yellow card) 90'; Musona 90+5'	Stadium: Al-Hazem Club Stadium; Attendance: 1,984; Referee: Khaled Al-Teris

7 January 2022 16	Al-Taawoun	2–1	Al-Hazem	Buraidah
18:05	Tawamba 29'; Santos 84'; Al-Rashidi (yellow card) 90+5'	Report	Moha 27'; Alison (yellow card) 44'; Tiago (yellow card) 50'; Abdullah S. (yellow card) 79' (yellow-red card) 90+6'	Stadium: King Abdullah Sport City Stadium; Attendance: 4,375; Referee: Sandro Schärer (Switzerland)

15 January 2022 17	Al-Ahli	1–0	Al-Hazem	Jeddah
20:00	Alioski (yellow card) 12'; Dankler (yellow card) 38'; Al Somah 44'; Asiri (yellow card) 45+2'	Report	Moha (yellow card) 8'; Al-Obaid (yellow card) 38'	Stadium: Prince Abdullah Al-Faisal Stadium; Attendance: 8,520; Referee: Khaled Salwi

22 January 2022 18	Al-Hazem	2–0	Al-Raed	Ar Rass
18:20	John 6'; Al-Sahlawi (yellow card) 61'; Abdullah S. (yellow card) 66'; Zerhouni 89'	Report	René (yellow card) 13'	Stadium: Al-Hazem Club Stadium; Attendance: 2,009; Referee: Majed Al-Shamrani

5 February 2022 19	Al-Hazem	1–2	Al-Shabab	Ar Rass
15:50	Abdullah S. (yellow card) 35'; Al-Khalaf (yellow card) 36'; John 39'	Report	Carlos 44'; Vietto 51'; Paulinho (yellow card) 74'; Bahebri (yellow card) 79'; Al-Harbi (yellow card) 90+3'; Al-Qarni (yellow card) 90+5'; N'Diaye (yellow card) 90+7'	Stadium: Al-Hazem Club Stadium; Attendance: 2,618; Referee: Raed Al-Zahrani

11 February 2022 20	Abha	2–1	Al-Hazem	Abha
16:05	Al-Jumayah 65', 90+5'	Report	Al-Khalaf 9'; Al-Aazmi (yellow card) 33'	Stadium: Prince Sultan bin Abdul Aziz Stadium; Attendance: 252; Referee: Mohammed Al-Beredi

18 February 2022 21	Al-Hazem	0–1	Al-Fateh	Ar Rass
16:00	Abdullah S. (red card) 8'	Report	Boushal (red card) 3'; Al-Zubaidi (yellow card) 21'; Al-Yousef (yellow card) 61'; Al-Buraikan 72'; Petros (yellow card) 81'; Koval (yellow card) 88'	Stadium: Al-Hazem Club Stadium; Attendance: 1,924; Referee: Khaled Al-Teris

26 February 2022 22	Al-Hilal	2–0	Al-Hazem	Riyadh
18:25	Carrillo 57'; Pereira (yellow card) 64'; Abdulhamid (yellow card) 82'; Marega 89'; Al-Juwayr (red card) 90+9'	Report	Al-Khalaf (yellow card) 10'; Zidan (yellow card) 83'; S. Al-Harthi (yellow card) 90+3'	Stadium: Prince Faisal bin Fahd Stadium; Attendance: 7,915; Referee: Ovidiu Hațegan (Romania)

5 March 2022 23	Al-Faisaly	1–0	Al-Hazem	Al Majma'ah
18:40	Boyle 18'; Faik (yellow card) 42'	Report	Henty (yellow card) 66'	Stadium: Al Majma'ah Sports City; Attendance: 3,494; Referee: Mohammed Al-Hoaish

12 March 2022 24	Al-Hazem	0–1	Damac	Ar Rass
18:50	Al-Najei (yellow card) 85'; Al-Dakheel (yellow card) 90+1'	Report	Zelaya 30' (pen.); Al-Najjar (yellow card) 54'; Antolić (yellow card) 90+1'	Stadium: Al-Hazem Club Stadium; Attendance: 1,781; Referee: Mohammed Al-Qarni

18 March 2022 25	Al-Ittihad	3–0	Al-Hazem	Jeddah
19:05	Al-Aboud (yellow card) 42'; Al-Hafith (yellow card) 44'; Al-Shanqeeti 66'; Hamdallah 86', 90+6'	Report	Abdulelah S. (yellow card) 18'; Al-Khalaf (yellow card) 64'; Neris (yellow card) 90+3'	Stadium: King Abdullah Sports City; Attendance: 52,329; Referee: Andrés Cunha (Uruguay)

7 May 2022 26	Al-Hazem	3–1	Al-Fayha	Ar Rass
19:20	Al-Otaibi 17'; Neris (yellow card) 54'; Zerhouni 59'; Al-Obaid (yellow card) 83'; Stojanović 90+6'	Report	Al-Safri (yellow card) 42'; Trajkovski 45', (yellow card) 90+4'; Al-Baqawi (yellow card) 49'	Stadium: Al-Hazem Club Stadium; Attendance: 609; Referee: Faisal Al-Blwi

21 May 2022 27	Al-Ettifaq	5–2	Al-Hazem	Dammam
19:00	Abdellaoui (yellow card) 16'; Quaison 30'; Younes 42'; Sliti 54', 56', (yellow card) 74'; Al-Khateeb (yellow card) 67'; Mahnashi (yellow card) 90+4'; A. Al-Ghamdi 90+5'	Report	Faqihi 45+3', (yellow card) 50'; John 77' (pen.)	Stadium: Prince Mohamed bin Fahd Stadium; Attendance: 4,396; Referee: Khaled Al-Teris

27 May 2022 28	Al-Hazem	2–3	Al-Batin	Ar Rass
19:25	Al-Dakheel (red card) 4'; John 48'; Neris (yellow card) 61'; Zerhouni 80'	Report	Sami (yellow card) 18'; Chaves (yellow card) 34'; Abreu (yellow card) 62', (goal) 65'; Fawaz 87', 90'; Antônio (yellow card) 90+7'	Stadium: Al-Hazem Club Stadium; Attendance: 736; Referee: Mohammed Al-Qarni

23 June 2022 29	Al-Hazem	1–4	Al-Nassr	Ar Rass
21:00	Neris (yellow card) 55'; Al-Obaid (yellow card) 56'; John 69' (pen.); Stojanović (yellow card) 71'; Abdullah S. (yellow card) 82'	Report	Al-Amri 12'; Martínez (yellow card) 53'; Talisca 60', 90+3'; Al-Najei 84'	Stadium: Al-Hazem Club Stadium; Attendance: 3,940; Referee: Mohammed Al-Hoaish

27 June 2022 30	Al-Tai	3–0	Al-Hazem	Ha'il
21:00	Al-Zubaidi (yellow card) 27'; Figueroa 34'; Musona 76'; Ali 87'	Report	Abdullah S. (yellow card) 71'	Stadium: Prince Abdul Aziz bin Musa'ed Stadium; Attendance: 4,974; Referee: Abdullah Al-Harbi

=== King Cup ===
All times are local, AST (UTC+3).

20 December 2021 Round of 16	Al-Batin	1–0	Al-Hazem	Hafar al-Batin
15:05	Nasser (yellow card) 70'; Al-Shammari (yellow card) 90+4'; Fábio Abreu 90+5'	Report	Al-Obaid (yellow card) 56'; Abdullah S. (yellow card) 58'	Stadium: Al-Batin Club Stadium; Referee: Mohammed Al-Esmaiel

== Statistics ==
=== Appearances ===
Last updated on 27 June 2022.

No.	Pos	Nat	Player	Total		Pro League		King Cup	
No.	Pos	Nat	Player	Apps	Goals	Apps	Goals	Apps	Goals
Goalkeepers
1	GK	(Saudi Arabia) KSA	Dawod Al Saeed	8	0	8	0	0	0
23	GK	(Saudi Arabia) KSA	Ibrahim Zaid	14	0	14	0	0	0
31	GK	(Saudi Arabia) KSA	Habib Al-Wotayan	0	0	0	0	0	0
Defenders
2	DF	(Saudi Arabia) KSA	Abdulrahman Al-Rio	1	0	0+1	0	0	0
3	DF	(Saudi Arabia) KSA	Khaled Al-Barakah	9	0	1+8	0	0	0
14	DF	(Saudi Arabia) KSA	Sultan Faqihi	17	1	12+5	1	0	0
24	DF	(Saudi Arabia) KSA	Fahad Al-Obaid	22	0	19+2	0	1	0
27	DF	(Brazil) BRA	Hueglo Neris	26	0	25+1	0	0	0
28	DF	(Saudi Arabia) KSA	Abdullah Al-Shammari	21	0	17+3	0	1	0
34	DF	(Saudi Arabia) KSA	Abdulrahman Al-Dakheel	28	0	21+6	0	1	0
66	DF	(Saudi Arabia) KSA	Farhan Al-Aazmi	17	0	12+4	0	1	0
67	MF	(Saudi Arabia) KSA	Mohammed Abdulrahman	0	0	0	0	0	0
88	DF	(Saudi Arabia) KSA	Osama Al-Khalaf	10	1	9+1	1	0	0
Midfielders
4	MF	(Brazil) BRA	Alison	19	0	18+1	0	0	0
5	MF	(Saudi Arabia) KSA	Ahmed Al-Najei	19	0	14+5	0	0	0
6	MF	(Saudi Arabia) KSA	Ahmed Al-Juwaid	19	0	8+10	0	1	0
7	MF	(Saudi Arabia) KSA	Abdulhadi Al-Harajin	13	1	3+9	1	0+1	0
11	MF	(Netherlands) NED	Ola John	25	8	24	8	1	0
13	MF	(Morocco) MAR	Abdelilah Hafidi	7	0	5+2	0	0	0
15	MF	(Saudi Arabia) KSA	Hamad Al-Abdan	10	0	3+6	0	0+1	0
16	MF	(Saudi Arabia) KSA	Saud Zidan	16	0	11+4	0	1	0
17	MF	(Saudi Arabia) KSA	Abdulrahman Al-Harthi	5	0	2+3	0	0	0
18	MF	(Saudi Arabia) KSA	Abdulelah Al-Shammeri	16	0	10+6	0	0	0
22	MF	(Serbia) SRB	Luka Stojanović	9	1	6+3	1	0	0
26	MF	(Saudi Arabia) KSA	Ahmed Al-Otaibi	0	0	0	0	0	0
29	MF	(Saudi Arabia) KSA	Saleh Al-Harthi	5	0	0+5	0	0	0
41	MF	(Saudi Arabia) KSA	Thaar Al-Otaibi	17	1	9+7	1	1	0
89	MF	(Saudi Arabia) KSA	Ahmed Al-Shuwayfie	0	0	0	0	0	0
Forwards
9	FW	(Niger) NIG	Yousef Omar	16	0	2+14	0	0	0
12	FW	(Saudi Arabia) KSA	Abdulaziz Al-Harbi	1	0	0+1	0	0	0
19	FW	(Nigeria) NGR	Ezekiel Henty	9	0	4+5	0	0	0
47	FW	(Saudi Arabia) KSA	Basim Al-Oraini	1	0	0+1	0	0	0
87	FW	(Saudi Arabia) KSA	Mohammad Al-Sahlawi	8	0	5+3	0	0	0
95	FW	(Morocco) MAR	Naoufel Zerhouni	13	3	13	3	0	0
Players sent out on loan this season
10	MF	(Mali) MLI	Ibrahima Tandia	2	0	1+1	0	0	0
33	GK	(Saudi Arabia) KSA	Majed Al-Ghamdi	0	0	0	0	0	0
81	MF	(Saudi Arabia) KSA	Ibrahim Al-Barakah	2	0	1+1	0	0	0
Player who made an appearance this season but have left the club
8	MF	(Saudi Arabia) KSA	Abdulrahman Al-Dhefiri	1	0	0	0	0+1	0
20	MF	(Portugal) POR	Tiago Rodrigues	17	1	16	1	1	0
21	MF	(Morocco) MAR	Moha Rharsalla	11	3	10+1	3	0	0
30	GK	(Algeria) ALG	Malik Asselah	9	0	8	0	1	0
32	DF	(Saudi Arabia) KSA	Masoud Bakheet	10	0	6+4	0	0	0
70	DF	(Saudi Arabia) KSA	Mohammed Bassas	1	0	0+1	0	0	0
77	FW	(Saudi Arabia) KSA	Sulaiman Al-Saeed	4	0	0+4	0	0	0
99	FW	(Sweden) SWE	Carlos Strandberg	15	1	13+1	1	1	0

=== Goalscorers ===
Rank	No.	Pos	Nat	Name	Pro League	King Cup	Total
1	11	MF	(Netherlands)	Ola John	8	0	8
2	21	MF	(Morocco)	Moha Rharsalla	3	0	3
2	95	FW	(Morocco)	Naoufel Zerhouni	3	0	3
4	7	MF	(Saudi Arabia)	Abdulhadi Al-Harajin	1	0	1
4	14	DF	(Saudi Arabia)	Sultan Faqihi	1	0	1
4	20	MF	(Portugal)	Tiago Rodrigues	1	0	1
4	22	MF	(Serbia)	Luka Stojanović	1	0	1
4	41	MF	(Saudi Arabia)	Thaar Al-Otaibi	1	0	1
4	88	DF	(Saudi Arabia)	Osama Al-Khalaf	1	0	1
4	99	FW	(Sweden)	Carlos Strandberg	1	0	1
Own goal					2	0	2
Total					23	0	23

Last Updated: 23 June 2022

=== Assists ===
Rank	No.	Pos	Nat	Name	Pro League	King Cup	Total
1	5	MF	(Saudi Arabia)	Ahmed Al-Najei	3	0	3
1	11	MF	(Netherlands)	Ola John	3	0	3
3	24	DF	(Saudi Arabia)	Fahad Al-Obaid	2	0	2
4	4	MF	(Brazil)	Alison	1	0	1
4	13	MF	(Morocco)	Abdelilah Hafidi	1	0	1
4	19	FW	(Nigeria)	Ezekiel Henty	1	0	1
4	20	MF	(Portugal)	Tiago Rodrigues	1	0	1
4	34	DF	(Saudi Arabia)	Abdulrahman Al-Dakheel	1	0	1
4	41	MF	(Saudi Arabia)	Thaar Al-Otaibi	1	0	1
Total					14	0	14

Last Updated: 27 May 2022

=== Clean sheets ===
Rank	No.	Pos	Nat	Name	Pro League	King Cup	Total
1	30	GK	(Algeria)	Malik Asselah	3	0	3
2	1	GK	(Saudi Arabia)	Dawod Al Saeed	1	0	1
2	23	GK	(Saudi Arabia)	Ibrahim Zaid	1	0	1
Total					5	0	5

Last Updated: 22 January 2022
