= 2020–21 Al-Hazem F.C. season =

Al-Hazem
2020–21 season
- President: Abdullah Al-Meqhim
- Manager: Mohammed Dahmane
- Stadium: Al-Hazem Club Stadium
- MS League: 1st (promoted)
- Top goalscorer: League: Ousmane Barry (19); All: Ousmane Barry (19)
Home colours	Away colours	Third colours
- All statistics correct as of 31 May 2021.

The 2020–21 season was Al-Hazem's 64th year in their existence and their first back season in the MS League. Al-Hazem were relegated to the second tier of Saudi football after finishing 15th in the 2019–20 Saudi Pro League. The club participated in the MS League only following the Saudi FF's decision to reduce the number of teams in the King Cup.

The season covered the period 22 September 2020 to 30 June 2021.

== Players ==
=== Squad information ===
As of 1 February 2021

Note: Flags indicate national team as defined under FIFA eligibility rules; some limited exceptions apply. Players may hold more than one non-FIFA nationality.

No.	Pos.	Nation	Player
1	GK	KSA	Dawod Al Saeed
2	DF	KSA	Yousef Al-Mosaabi
3	DF	KSA	Khaled Al-Barakah (on loan from Al-Ahli)
4	DF	KSA	Mohammed Abdulrahman
5	MF	KSA	Ahmed Al-Najei
8	MF	KSA	Abdulrahman Al-Dhefiri
9	FW	GUI	Ousmane Barry
10	MF	MLI	Ibrahima Tandia
11	MF	KSA	Jehad Al-Zowayed (on loan from Abha)
12	MF	KSA	Essam Al-Muwallad (on loan from Al-Ittihad)
14	DF	KSA	Sultan Faqihi
17	MF	KSA	Abdulrahman Al-Harthi
18	MF	KSA	Hammad Al-Shaye
20	FW	NIG	Yousef Omar
21	MF	KSA	Abdulaziz Al-Nashi
22	GK	KSA	Abdullah Abdulhameed

No.	Pos.	Nation	Player
23	GK	KSA	Ibrahim Zaid
24	MF	KSA	Maher Al-Mutairi
27	DF	KSA	Abdullah Kanno
32	DF	KSA	Masoud Bakheet
33	GK	KSA	Majed Al-Ghamdi
34	DF	KSA	Abdulrahman Al-Dakheel
48	MF	KSA	Abdullah Al-Samti (on loan from Damac)
66	DF	KSA	Farhan Al-Aazmi
70	DF	KSA	Ahmed Al-Shamrani
74	MF	FRA	Karim Yoda
77	MF	KSA	Abdulhadi Al-Harajin
81	MF	KSA	Ibrahim Al-Barakah (on loan from Damac)
88	MF	BRA	Muralha
91	FW	KSA	Mohammed Al-Dahami
99	DF	KSA	Fahad Al-Obaid

=== Out on loan ===
Note: Flags indicate national team as defined under FIFA eligibility rules; some limited exceptions apply. Players may hold more than one non-FIFA nationality.

No.	Pos.	Nation	Player
6	DF	KSA	Omar Mohammed (at Ohod until 30 June 2021)
7	MF	KSA	Ghallab Al-Enezi (at Al-Shoulla until 30 June 2021)

No.	Pos.	Nation	Player
28	DF	KSA	Abdullah Al-Shammari (at Al-Jabalain until 30 June 2021)
99	FW	SWE	Carlos Strandberg (at Abha until 30 June 2021)

== Transfers and loans ==
=== Transfers in ===
Entry date	Position	No.	Player	From club	Fee	Ref.
22 September 2020	DF	34	(Saudi Arabia) Abdulrahman Al-Dakheel	(Saudi Arabia) Al-Taqadom	End of loan	
22 September 2020	MF	5	(Saudi Arabia) Ahmed Al-Najei	(Saudi Arabia) Abha	Free	
22 September 2020	MF	10	(Mali) Ibrahima Tandia	(Tunisia) CS Sfaxien	End of loan	
22 September 2020	MF	24	(Saudi Arabia) Maher Al Mutairi	(Saudi Arabia) Al-Taqadom	End of loan	
22 September 2020	FW	8	(Saudi Arabia) Hamed Al-Maqati	(Saudi Arabia) Al-Ain	End of loan	
22 September 2020	FW	18	(Saudi Arabia) Hammad Al-Shaye	(Saudi Arabia) Al-Bukayriyah	End of loan	
23 September 2020	FW	9	(Guinea) Ousmane Barry	(Saudi Arabia) Al-Bukayriyah	Free	
27 September 2020	DF	66	(Saudi Arabia) Farhan Al-Aazmi	(Saudi Arabia) Al-Bukayriyah	Free	
30 September 2020	GK	23	(Saudi Arabia) Ibrahim Zaid	(Saudi Arabia) Al-Tai	Free	
1 October 2020	MF	17	(Saudi Arabia) Abdulrahman Al-Harthi	(Saudi Arabia) Al-Ahli	Free	
2 October 2020	MF	8	(Saudi Arabia) Abdulrahman Al-Dhefiri	(Saudi Arabia) Al-Nassr	Free	
6 October 2020	MF	77	(Saudi Arabia) Abdulhadi Al-Harajin	(Saudi Arabia) Al-Khaleej	Free	
6 February 2021	DF	27	(Saudi Arabia) Abdullah Kanno	(Saudi Arabia) Al-Kawkab	Free	
7 February 2021	DF	99	(Saudi Arabia) Fahad Al-Obaid	(Saudi Arabia) Al-Mujazzal	Undisclosed	

=== Loans in ===
Start date	End date	Position	No.	Player	From club	Fee	Ref.
9 October 2020	End of season	DF	3	(Saudi Arabia) Khaled Al-Barakah	(Saudi Arabia) Al-Ahli	None	
9 October 2020	End of season	MF	12	(Saudi Arabia) Essam Al-Muwallad	(Saudi Arabia) Al-Ittihad	None	
17 October 2020	End of season	MF	11	(Saudi Arabia) Jehad Al-Zowayed	(Saudi Arabia) Abha	None	
25 October 2020	End of season	MF	48	(Saudi Arabia) Abdullah Al-Samti	(Saudi Arabia) Damac	None	
25 October 2020	End of season	MF	81	(Saudi Arabia) Ibrahim Al-Barakah	(Saudi Arabia) Damac	None	

=== Transfers out ===
Exit date	Position	No.	Player	To club	Fee	Ref.
22 September 2020	DF	13	(Saudi Arabia) Mohammed Al-Zubaidi	(Saudi Arabia) Al-Ahli	End of loan	
22 September 2020	DF	37	(Saudi Arabia) Osama Al-Khalaf	(Saudi Arabia) Al-Nassr	$1,333,000	
22 September 2020	MF	18	(Saudi Arabia) Abdulaziz Majrashi	(Saudi Arabia) Al-Ettifaq	End of loan	
22 September 2020	MF	23	(Saudi Arabia) Hassan Al-Habib	(Saudi Arabia) Al-Fateh	Undisclosed	
22 September 2020	MF	25	(Saudi Arabia) Nawaf Al-Farshan	(Saudi Arabia) Al-Nassr	End of loan	
23 September 2020	FW	3	(Saudi Arabia) Abdulrahman Al-Yami	(Saudi Arabia) Al-Ittihad	Undisclosed	
6 October 2020	MF	33	(Morocco) Driss Fettouhi	(Saudi Arabia) Al-Ahli	$700,000	
8 October 2020	DF	77	(Saudi Arabia) Saif Al-Qeshtah	(Saudi Arabia) Al-Ain	Free	
12 October 2020	FW	8	(Saudi Arabia) Hamed Al-Maqati	(Saudi Arabia) Al-Diriyah	Free	
13 October 2020	MF	17	(Saudi Arabia) Fares Al-Ayyaf	(Saudi Arabia) Al-Bukayriyah	Free	
25 October 2020	MF	15	(Saudi Arabia) Mansor Hamzi	(Saudi Arabia) Damac	Free	
28 October 2020	DF	7	(Saudi Arabia) Wesam Al-Sowayed	(Saudi Arabia) Al-Kawkab	Free	
9 November 2020	MF	19	(Brazil) Jonathan Cafú	(Brazil) Corinthians	Free	
18 November 2020	DF	4	(Brazil) Alemão	(Brazil) Avaí	Free	

=== Loans out ===
Start date	End date	Position	No.	Player	To club	Fee	Ref.
18 October 2020	End of season	FW	99	(Sweden) Carlos Strandberg	(Saudi Arabia) Abha	None	
7 January 2021	End of season	DF	6	(Saudi Arabia) Omar Mohammed	(Saudi Arabia) Ohod	None	
15 January 2021	End of season	MF	7	(Saudi Arabia) Ghallab Al-Enezi	(Saudi Arabia) Al-Shoulla	None	
7 February 2021	End of season	DF	28	(Saudi Arabia) Abdullah Al-Shammeri	(Saudi Arabia) Al-Jabalain	None	

== Pre-season ==
11 October 2020 Friendly	Al-Raed (Saudi Arabia)	1–1	(Saudi Arabia) Al-Hazem	Buraidah, Saudi Arabia
18:15 AST	Al-Sahli 32'	Report	Barry 5'	Stadium: King Abdullah Sport City Stadium

15 October 2020 Friendly	Al-Hazem (Saudi Arabia)	3–1	(Saudi Arabia) Al-Orobah	Ar Rass, Saudi Arabia
18:30 AST	Yoda 38'; Muralha 57'; Faqihi 87'		Damen 20'	Stadium: Al-Hazem Club Stadium

== Competitions ==
=== MS League ===
==== League table ====
Pos	Team	Pld	W	D	L	GF	GA	GD	Pts	Promotion, qualification or relegation
1	Al-Hazem (C, P)	38	28	7	3	77	27	+50	91	Promotion to the Pro League
2	Al-Fayha (P)	38	24	9	5	72	27	+45	81	Promotion to the Pro League
3	Al-Tai (P)	38	23	8	7	58	33	+25	77	Promotion to the Pro League
4	Al-Jabalain	38	22	10	6	53	27	+26	76	
5	Hajer	38	15	10	13	49	37	+12	55	
6	Ohod	38	13	15	10	51	52	−1	54	
7	Al-Kawkab	38	13	13	12	47	48	−1	52 (Note: Al-Kawkab finished ahead of Al-Khaleej on overall goal difference: Al-Kawkab −1, Al-Khaleej −5 (Al-Kawkab 2–2 Al-Khaleej, Al-Khaleej 0–0 Al-Kawkab).)	
8	Al-Khaleej	38	13	13	12	42	47	−5	52	
9	Al-Shoulla	38	13	12	13	37	33	+4	51	
10	Al-Diriyah	38	13	9	16	34	39	−5	48 (Note: Al-Diriyah finished ahead of Jeddah on overall goal difference: Al-Diriyah −5, Jeddah −6 (Jeddah 1–2 Al-Diriyah, Al-Diriyah 0–1 Jeddah).)	
11	Jeddah	38	13	9	16	48	54	−6	48	
12	Al-Adalah	38	10	16	12	44	39	+5	46 (Note: Al-Adalah finished ahead of Al-Sahel on head-to-head points: Al-Adalah 3–0 Al-Sahel, Al-Sahel 1–2 Al-Adalah.)	
13	Al-Sahel	38	11	13	14	34	48	−14	46	
14	Al-Jeel	38	11	11	16	37	52	−15	44	
15	Najran	38	10	13	15	43	47	−4	43	
16	Al-Nahda	38	9	15	14	37	45	−8	42	
17	Al-Bukayriyah (R)	38	11	7	20	29	48	−19	40	Relegation to the Second Division
18	Al-Thoqbah (R)	38	10	7	21	45	60	−15	37	Relegation to the Second Division
19	Arar (R)	38	4	14	20	28	62	−34	26	Relegation to the Second Division
20	Al-Nojoom (R)	38	6	5	27	27	67	−40	23	Relegation to the Second Division

Source: goalzz.com
Rules for classification: 1) Points; 2) Head-to-head points; 3) Head-to-head goal difference; 4) Total goal difference; 5) Total goals scored; 6) Fair-play points (Note: Head-to-head record is used only after all the matches between the teams in question have been played).
(C) Champions; (P) Promoted; (R) Relegated

==== Results summary ====
Overall								Home						Away					
Pld	W	D	L	GF	GA	GD	Pts	W	D	L	GF	GA	GD	W	D	L	GF	GA	GD
38	28	7	3	77	27	+50	91	13	4	2	37	11	+26	15	3	1	40	16	+24

Last updated: 31 May 2021.

==== Results by round ====
Round	1	2	3	4	5	6	7	8	9	10	11	12	13	14	15	16	17	18	19	20	21	22	23	24	25	26	27	28	29	30	31	32	33	34	35	36	37	38
Ground	H	H	A	H	A	A	A	H	H	A	H	A	H	A	H	A	H	A	H	A	A	H	A	H	H	H	A	A	H	A	H	A	H	A	H	A	H	A
Result	W	W	W	W	W	W	W	W	L	W	W	W	D	W	W	W	L	W	W	W	D	W	L	W	D	W	D	W	W	W	W	W	D	W	W	W	D	D
Position	3	1	1	1	1	1	1	1	1	1	1	1	1	1	1	1	1	1	1	1	1	1	1	1	1	1	1	1	1	1	1	1	1	1	1	1	1	1

Updated to match(es) played on 31 May 2021. Source:
A = Away; H = Home; W = Win; D = Draw; L = Loss

==== Matches ====
All times are local, AST (UTC+3).

Win Draw Loss Postponed

20 October 2020 1	Al-Hazem	2–0	Arar	Ar Rass
18:10	Tandia 55'; Al-Harajin 90+4' (pen.)	Report		Stadium: Al-Hazem Club Stadium; Referee: Raed Al-Zahrani

28 October 2020 2	Al-Hazem	3–1	Al-Tai	Ar Rass
18:05	Faqihi 22'; Tandia 26', 79'	Report	Jailson 34'	Stadium: Al-Hazem Club Stadium; Referee: Abdullah Al-Awidan

4 November 2020 3	Al-Khaleej	2–4	Al-Hazem	Khobar
17:30	El Okbi 62' (pen.); Al-Daheem 71'	Report	Muralha 14'; Tandia 51'; Al-Harthi 90', 90+3'	Stadium: Prince Saud bin Jalawi Stadium; Referee: Mishaal Al-Shehri

9 November 2020 4	Al-Hazem	5–1	Ohod	Ar Rass
15:20	Barry 11', 28'; Yoda 16', 41'; Al-Aazmi 90+3'	Report	Sory 88' (pen.)	Stadium: Al-Hazem Club Stadium; Referee: Ahmed Al-Barakati

17 November 2020 5	Al-Diriyah	0–1	Al-Hazem	Riyadh
15:05		Report	Yoda 26'	Stadium: Prince Turki bin Abdul Aziz Stadium; Referee: Abdullah Al-Nuhait

25 November 2020 6	Al-Nahda	1–2	Al-Hazem	Dammam
17:25	Al-Hamdan 78'	Report	Faqihi 31'; Barry 62'	Stadium: Prince Mohamed bin Fahd Stadium; Referee: Abdullah Al-Shehri

29 November 2020 7	Al-Thoqbah	1–2	Al-Hazem	Dammam
17:20	Omrani 26'	Report	Yoda 24'; Tandia 44'	Stadium: Prince Mohamed bin Fahd Stadium; Referee: Bandar Al-Qahtani

4 December 2020 8	Al-Hazem	2–0	Al-Kawkab	Ar Rass
15:15	Barry 69'; Omar 71'	Report		Stadium: Al-Hazem Club Stadium; Referee: Maitham Al-Daleem

8 December 2020 9	Al-Hazem	1–4	Al-Adalah	Ar Rass
15:15	Atassi 79' (o.g.)	Report	Al-Radhi 19'; Al-Faresi 56'; Khattab 82'; Everton 90+7' (pen.)	Stadium: Al-Hazem Club Stadium; Referee: Raed Al-Zahrani

14 December 2020 10	Al-Jeel	1–4	Al-Hazem	Dammam
15:00	Bassim 48'	Report	Al-Aazmi 23'; Barry 31'; Yoda 45+3'; Omar 90+1'	Stadium: Prince Abdullah bin Jalawi Stadium; Referee: Abdullah Zarban

22 December 2020 11	Al-Hazem	3–1	Al-Nojoom	Ar Rass
15:20	Barry 20' (pen.), 53'; Yoda 75'	Report	Al-Aboud 63'	Stadium: Al-Hazem Club Stadium; Referee: Mishari Al-Shammari

27 December 2020 12	Al-Shoulla	0–2	Al-Hazem	Al-Kharj
15:10		Report	Barry 14' (pen.); Yoda 62'	Stadium: Al-Shoulla Club Stadium; Referee: Fraih Al-Jaloud

1 January 2021 13	Al-Hazem	0–0	Al-Sahel	Ar Rass
15:30		Report		Stadium: Al-Hazem Club Stadium; Referee: Mohammed Al-Amri

5 January 2021 14	Al-Jabalain	1–2	Al-Hazem	Ha'il
15:35	Al-Shammari 90+6'	Report	Al-Samti 42'; Barry 53'	Stadium: Prince Abdul Aziz bin Musa'ed Stadium; Referee: Abdullah Al-Shehri

13 January 2021 15	Al-Hazem	5–0	Jeddah	Ar Rass
15:35	Tandia 6'; K. Al-Barakah 30'; Omar 33', 39'; Yoda 89'	Report		Stadium: Al-Hazem Club Stadium; Referee: Mohammed Al-Buraidi

19 January 2021 16	Al-Bukayriyah	0–1	Al-Hazem	Al Bukayriyah
15:40		Report	Tandia 81'	Stadium: Al-Bukayriyah Club Stadium; Referee: Abdullah Al-Kharboush

24 January 2021 17	Al-Hazem	0–1	Hajer	Ar Rass
15:45		Report	Boughanmi 11'	Stadium: Al-Hazem Club Stadium; Referee: Abdulsamad Bakri

28 January 2021 18	Najran	0–2	Al-Hazem	Najran
15:55		Report	Al-Aazmi 45+1'; Barry 49'	Stadium: Najran University Stadium; Referee: Sami Al-Jires

2 February 2021 19	Al-Hazem	1–0	Al-Fayha	Ar Rass
15:50	Barry 61'	Report		Stadium: Al-Hazem Club Stadium; Referee: Abdulrahman Al-Sultan

9 February 2021 20	Arar	1–5	Al-Hazem	Arar
15:55	Jackson 45'	Report	Barry 6', 24'; Tandia 73'; Yoda 80'; Omar 90+4'	Stadium: Prince Abdullah bin Abdulaziz Sport City Stadium; Referee: Abdullah Zarban

16 February 2021 21	Al-Tai	3–3	Al-Hazem	Ha'il
16:00	Kouakou 70'; Al-Shammari 71'; Al-Shamrani 90'	Report	Omar 25'; Tandia 79'; Yoda 90+4'	Stadium: Prince Abdul Aziz bin Musa'ed Stadium; Referee: Shukri Al-Hanfoush

22 February 2021 22	Al-Hazem	1–0	Al-Khaleej	Ar Rass
16:00	Al-Harthi 90+3'	Report		Stadium: Al-Hazem Club Stadium; Referee: Khaled Salwi

26 February 2021 23	Ohod	3–2	Al-Hazem	Medina
16:20	Diomandé 14', 56', 83'	Report	Tandia 12'; Barry 90+5'	Stadium: Prince Mohammed bin Abdul Aziz Stadium; Referee: Abdullah Al-Kharboush

3 March 2021 24	Al-Hazem	2–0	Al-Diriyah	Ar Rass
16:05	K. Al-Barakah 46'; Yoda 90+3'	Report		Stadium: Al-Hazem Club Stadium; Referee: Mohammed Al-Buraidi

10 March 2021 25	Al-Hazem	1–1	Al-Nahda	Ar Rass
16:05	Tandia 46'	Report	Abbès 48'	Stadium: Al-Hazem Club Stadium; Referee: Nasrullo Kabirov (Tajikistan)

16 March 2021 26	Al-Hazem	4–0	Al-Thoqbah	Ar Rass
16:10	Bakheet 27'; Al-Zowayed 56'; Omar 78'; Tandia 86' (pen.)	Report		Stadium: Al-Hazem Club Stadium; Referee: Sultan Al-Okairi

22 March 2021 27	Al-Kawkab	1–1	Al-Hazem	Al-Kharj
15:55	Al-Dossari 64' (pen.)	Report	Barry 75'	Stadium: Al-Shoulla Club Stadium; Referee: Mohammed Al-Smail

27 March 2021 28	Al-Adalah	0–1	Al-Hazem	Al-Hasa
18:35		Report	Tandia 79'	Stadium: Prince Abdullah bin Jalawi Stadium; Referee: Sultan Al-Harbi

1 April 2021 29	Al-Hazem	4–1	Al-Jeel	Ar Rass
16:10	Al-Zowayed 19', 73'; Barry 25', 90+1'	Report	Al-Tas 58'	Stadium: Al-Hazem Club Stadium; Referee: Khaled Salwi

7 April 2021 30	Al-Nojoom	0–1	Al-Hazem	Al-Hasa
18:40		Report	Muralha 77'	Stadium: Prince Abdullah bin Jalawi Stadium; Referee: Ibrahim Al-Aseel

14 April 2021 31	Al-Hazem	1–0	Al-Shoulla	Ar Rass
22:00	Yoda 33'	Report		Stadium: Al-Hazem Club Stadium; Referee: Abdulsamad Bakri

20 April 2021 32	Al-Sahel	2–4	Al-Hazem	Khobar
21:35	Al-Dhefiery 9'; Musonda 90+1'	Report	Al-Zowayed 18'; Omar 45+2'; Bakheet 51'; Barry 82'	Stadium: Prince Saud bin Jalawi Stadium; Referee: Bandar Al-Qahtani

25 April 2021 33	Al-Hazem	0–0	Al-Jabalain	Ar Rass
22:00		Report		Stadium: Al-Hazem Club Stadium; Referee: Shukri Al-Hanfoush

29 April 2021 34	Jeddah	0–2	Al-Hazem	Jeddah
22:15		Report	Omar 32'; Al-Aazmi 88'	Stadium: King Abdullah Sports City Reserve Stadium; Referee: Mohammed Al-Hoaish

16 May 2021 35	Al-Hazem	2–1	Al-Bukayriyah	Ar Rass
19:20	Yoda 47'; Al-Harthi 90+5'	Report	Belal 70'	Stadium: Al-Hazem Club Stadium; Referee: Faisal Al-Blwi

21 May 2021 36	Hajer	0–1	Al-Hazem	Al-Hasa
19:00		Report	Barry 37'	Stadium: Hajer Club Stadium; Referee: Abdullah Zarban

26 May 2021 37	Al-Hazem	0–0	Najran	Ar Rass
19:30		Report		Stadium: Al-Hazem Club Stadium; Referee: Mohammed Al-Smail

31 May 2021 38	Al-Fayha	0–0	Al-Hazem	Al Majma'ah
21:00		Report		Stadium: Al Majma'ah Sports City; Referee: Abdullah Al-Kharboush

== Statistics ==
=== Appearances ===
Last updated on 31 May 2021.

No.	Pos	Nat	Player	Total		MS League	
No.	Pos	Nat	Player	Apps	Goals	Apps	Goals
Goalkeepers
1	GK	(Saudi Arabia) KSA	Dawod Al Saeed	26	0	26	0
22	GK	(Saudi Arabia) KSA	Majed Al-Ghamdi	1	0	1	0
23	GK	(Saudi Arabia) KSA	Ibrahim Zaid	12	0	11+1	0
Defenders
2	DF	(Saudi Arabia) KSA	Yousef Al-Mosaabi	0	0	0	0
3	DF	(Saudi Arabia) KSA	Khaled Al-Barakah	35	2	31+4	2
4	DF	(Saudi Arabia) KSA	Mohammed Abdulrahman	0	0	0	0
14	DF	(Saudi Arabia) KSA	Sultan Faqihi	23	2	20+3	2
27	DF	(Saudi Arabia) KSA	Abdullah Kanno	1	0	0+1	0
32	DF	(Saudi Arabia) KSA	Masoud Bakheet	19	2	16+3	2
34	DF	(Saudi Arabia) KSA	Abdulrahman Al-Dakheel	33	0	31+2	0
66	DF	(Saudi Arabia) KSA	Farhan Al-Aazmi	34	4	31+3	4
70	DF	(Saudi Arabia) KSA	Ahmed Al-Shamrani	16	0	12+4	0
99	DF	(Saudi Arabia) KSA	Fahad Al-Obaid	11	0	9+2	0
Midfielders
5	MF	(Saudi Arabia) KSA	Ahmed Al-Najei	34	0	28+6	0
8	MF	(Saudi Arabia) KSA	Abdulrahman Al-Dhefiri	28	0	21+7	0
10	MF	(Mali) MLI	Ibrahima Tandia	36	13	35+1	13
11	MF	(Saudi Arabia) KSA	Jehad Al-Zowayed	31	4	14+17	4
12	MF	(Saudi Arabia) KSA	Essam Al-Muwallad	1	0	1	0
17	MF	(Saudi Arabia) KSA	Abdulrahman Al-Harthi	23	4	1+22	4
18	MF	(Saudi Arabia) KSA	Hammad Al-Shaye	1	0	0+1	0
21	MF	(Saudi Arabia) KSA	Abdulaziz Al-Nashi	9	0	3+6	0
24	MF	(Saudi Arabia) KSA	Maher Al-Mutairi	2	0	0+2	0
48	MF	(Saudi Arabia) KSA	Abdullah Al-Samti	23	1	11+12	1
74	MF	(France) FRA	Karim Yoda	35	13	32+3	13
77	MF	(Saudi Arabia) KSA	Abdulhadi Al-Harajin	22	1	8+14	1
81	MF	(Saudi Arabia) KSA	Ibrahim Al-Barakah	28	0	18+10	0
88	MF	(Brazil) BRA	Muralha	20	2	18+2	2
Forwards
9	FW	(Guinea) GUI	Ousmane Barry	34	19	30+4	19
20	FW	(Niger) NIG	Yousef Omar	33	9	9+24	9
91	FW	(Saudi Arabia) KSA	Mohammed Al-Dahami	1	0	0+1	0
Players sent out on loan this season
6	DF	(Saudi Arabia) KSA	Omar Mohammed	1	0	0+1	0
7	MF	(Saudi Arabia) KSA	Ghallab Al-Enezi	0	0	0	0
28	DF	(Saudi Arabia) KSA	Abdullah Al-Shammari	2	0	1+1	0

=== Goalscorers ===
Rank	No.	Pos	Nat	Name	MS League	Total
1	9	FW	(Guinea)	Ousmane Barry	19	19
2	10	MF	(Mali)	Ibrahima Tandia	13	13
2	74	MF	(France)	Karim Yoda	13	13
4	20	FW	(Niger)	Yousef Omar	9	9
5	11	MF	(Saudi Arabia)	Jehad Al-Zowayed	4	4
5	17	MF	(Saudi Arabia)	Abdulrahman Al-Harthi	4	4
5	66	DF	(Saudi Arabia)	Farhan Al-Aazmi	4	4
8	3	DF	(Saudi Arabia)	Khaled Al-Barakah	2	2
8	14	DF	(Saudi Arabia)	Sultan Faqihi	2	2
8	32	DF	(Saudi Arabia)	Masoud Bakheet	2	2
8	88	MF	(Brazil)	Muralha	2	2
12	48	MF	(Saudi Arabia)	Abdullah Al-Samti	1	1
12	77	MF	(Saudi Arabia)	Abdulhadi Al-Harajin	1	1
Own goal					1	1
Total					77	77

Last Updated: 21 May 2021

=== Clean sheets ===
Rank	No.	Pos	Nat	Name	MS League	Total
1	1	GK	(Saudi Arabia)	Dawod Al Saeed	13	13
2	23	GK	(Saudi Arabia)	Ibrahim Zaid	7	7
3	22	GK	(Saudi Arabia)	Majed Al-Ghamdi	1	1
Total					20	20

Last Updated: 31 May 2021
