= Ibrahima Tandia =

Malian footballer (born 1993)

Personal information
- Date of birth: 12 July 1993 (age 33)
- Place of birth: Longjumeau, France
- Height: 1.78 m (5 ft 10 in)
- Position: Attacking midfielder

Youth career
- 2000–2004: Massy
- 2004–2006: Boulogne-Billancourt
- 2006–2011: Sochaux

Senior career*
Years	Team	Apps	(Gls)
2011	Sochaux II	4	(0)
2011–2013	Caen	1	(0)
2011–2013	→ Caen II	35	(11)
2014–2017	Tours	59	(6)
2014–2017	→ Tours II	24	(7)
2018–2019	Sepsi OSK	51	(16)
2019–2022	Al-Hazem	50	(15)
2020	→ CS Sfaxien (loan)	12	(2)
2021–2022	→ Al-Adalah (loan)	28	(11)
2022–2023	Al-Ahli Tripoli	4	(1)
2023–2024	Qadsia	39	(16)
2024–2025	Al-Tai	29	(8)
2025–2026	Al-Riffa		

International career^{‡}
2008–2009	France U16	16	(3)
2009–2010	France U17	14	(2)
2016–2017	Mali U23	4	(1)
2019	Mali	3	(0)
- * Club domestic league appearances and goals as of 28 January 2026 ‡ National team caps and goals as of 6 October 2020

Ibrahima Tandia (born 12 July 1993) is a professional footballer who plays as a midfielder. Born in France, he represents Mali at international level.

== Club career ==
Born in Longjumeau, Tandia began his career playing for local amateur clubs in Paris before joining professional club Sochaux in 2006. After five years with the club, Tandia joined Caen on a three-year deal, despite reported interest from English clubs Newcastle United and Chelsea. He was assigned the number 26 shirt and made his professional debut on 28 August 2011 appearing as a substitute in a 3–2 defeat to Rennes.

On 28 June 2019, Tandia was transferred from Sepsi OSK Sfântu Gheorghe to Al-Hazem for €600,000.

On 1 September 2021, Tandia joined Al-Adalah on loan.

On 22 August 2022, Tandia joined Libyan club Al-Ahli Tripoli.

On 28 December 2022, Tandia joined Qadsia.

On 4 September 2024, Tandia joined Al-Tai.

On 9 August 2025, Tandia joined Bahrain Premier League club Al-Riffa.

== International career ==
Tandia was born and raised in France and is of Malian and Senegalese descent. At international level, Tandia was a France youth international having represented his nation at under-16 and under-17 level. Tandia was called up to the Mali national under-20 football team for the 2016 Toulon Tournament, and made his debut in a 1–0 loss to the Czech Republic U20s. Tandia scored his first goal in a 3–3 tie with the Mexico U23s in the same tournament.

He made his debut for Mali national football team on 26 March 2019 in a friendly against Senegal, as a 73rd-minute substitute for Moussa Doumbia.

== Career statistics ==
=== Club ===
As of match played 31 May 2024

Appearances and goals by club, season and competition
Club	Season	League			National Cup (Note: Includes Coupe de France)		League Cup (Note: Includes Coupe de la Ligue)		Continental		Other		Total	
Club	Season	Division	Apps	Goals	Apps	Goals	Apps	Goals	Apps	Goals	Apps	Goals	Apps	Goals
Sochaux II	2010–11	CFA	4	0	0	0	—		—		—		4	0
Caen	2011–12	Ligue 1	1	0	0	0	2	0	—		—		3	0
Caen	2012–13	Ligue 2	0	0	0	0	0	0	—		—		0	0
Caen	Total		1	0	0	0	2	0	—		—		3	0
Caen II	2011–12	CFA	14	4	—		—		—		—		3	0
Caen II	2012–13	CFA	21	7	—		—		—		—		0	0
Caen II	Total		35	11	—		—		—		—		35	11
Tours	2014–15	Ligue 2	20	3	3	1	0	0	—		—		23	4
Tours	2015–16	Ligue 2	25	3	2	2	4	1	—		—		31	6
Tours	2016–17	Ligue 2	8	0	0	0	1	0	—		—		9	0
Tours	2017–18	Ligue 2	6	0	1	1	0	0	—		—		7	1
Tours	Total		59	6	6	4	5	1	—		—		70	11
Tours II	2014–15	CFA	5	1	—		—		—		—		3	0
Tours II	2015–16	CFA	6	0	—		—		—		—		0	0
Tours II	2016–17	CFA	10	3	—		—		—		—		0	0
Tours II	2017–18	CFA	3	3	—		—		—		—		0	0
Tours II	Total		24	7	—		—		—		—		24	7
Sepsi OSK	2017–18	Liga I	17	5	0	0	—		—		—		17	5
Sepsi OSK	2018–19	Liga I	34	11	0	0	—		—		—		34	11
Sepsi OSK	Total		51	16	0	0	—		—		—		51	16
Al-Hazem	2019–20	SPL	12	2	0	0	—		—		—		12	2
Al-Hazem	2020–21	Saudi First Division	36	13	—		—		—		—		36	13
Al-Hazem	2021–22	SPL	2	0	0	0	—		—		—		2	0
Al-Hazem	Total		50	15	0	0	—		—		—		50	15
CS Sfaxien (loan)	2019–20	Tunisian Ligue 1	12	2	0	0	—		—		—		12	2
Al-Adalah	2021–22	Saudi First Division	28	11	—		—		—		—		28	11
Al-Ahli Tripoli	2022–23	Libyan Premier League	4	1	1	0	—		6	1	—		11	2
Al-Qadsia	2022–23	Kuwait Premier League	17	7	3	1	3	0	—		—		23	8
Al-Qadsia	2023–24	Kuwait Premier League	22	9	4	3	0	0	—		1 (Note: Appearance(s) in Kuwait Super Cup)	0	27	12
Al-Qadsia	Total		39	16	7	4	3	0	—		1	0	50	20
Career total			307	85	14	8	10	1	6	1	1	0	338	95

== Honours ==
Al-Hazem

- MS League: 2020–21,

Individual

- Liga I Team of the Regular Season: 2018–19,
- Liga I Team of the Season: 2018–19,
