= Ahmed Al-Najei =

Saudi Arabian association football player

Ahmed Al-Najei أحمد النجعي
Personal information
- Full name: Ahmed Shair Al-Najei
- Date of birth: 18 January 1995 (age 31)
- Place of birth: Saudi Arabia
- Height: 1.72 m (5 ft 8 in)
- Position: Midfielder

Youth career
- –2015: Al-Hilal
- 2015–2017: Al-Faisaly

Senior career*
Years	Team	Apps	(Gls)
2017–2018	Al-Faisaly	0	(0)
2017–2018	→ Al-Orobah (loan)	17	(0)
2018–2020	Abha	54	(1)
2020–2023	Al-Hazem	71	(0)
2023–2025	Ohod	10	(0)
- * Club domestic league appearances and goals as of 9 September 2020

Ahmed Al-Najei (Arabic: أحمد النجعي, born 18 January 1995) is a Saudi Arabian professional footballer who plays as a midfielder.

== Career ==
Al-Najei began his career at the youth team of Al-Hilal. He joined Al-Faisaly in 2015. He signed his first professional contract with the club on 1 February 2017. On 9 September 2017, Al-Najei joined MS League side Al-Orobah on loan for the 2017–18 season. On 24 July 2018, Al-Najei signed a one-year contract with Abha. Following Abha's promotion to the Pro League, Al-Najei renewed his contract for a further year. On 19 February 2020, Al-Najei signed a three-year contract with Al-Hazem and joined the club following the conclusion of the 2019–20 season. On 11 September 2023, Al-Najei joined Ohod on a three-year contract.

== Career statistics ==
=== Club ===
As of 31 May 2023.

Club	Season	League			Cup		Continental		Other		Total	
Club	Season	Division	Apps	Goals	Apps	Goals	Apps	Goals	Apps	Goals	Apps	Goals
Al-Faisaly	2016–17	Pro League	0	0	0	0	–		–		0	0
Al-Orobah (loan)	2017–18	MS League	17	0	1	0	–		–		18	0
Abha	2018–19	MS League	37	1	2	0	–		–		39	1
Abha	2019–20	Pro League	17	0	3	1	–		–		20	1
Abha	Total		54	1	5	1	0	0	0	0	59	2
Al-Hazem	2020–21	MS League	34	0	–		–		–		34	0
Al-Hazem	2021–22	Pro League	19	0	0	0	–		–		19	0
Al-Hazem	2022–23	First Division	18	0	–		–		–		18	0
Al-Hazem	Total		71	0	0	0	0	0	0	0	71	0
Career total			142	1	6	1	0	0	0	0	148	2

== Honours ==
Abha

- MS League: 2018–19

Al-Hazem

- MS League: 2020–21
