= Hueglo Neris =

Brazilian footballer (born 1992)

Neris
Personal information
- Full name: Hueglo dos Santos Neris
- Date of birth: June 17, 1992 (age 34)
- Place of birth: Tucuruí, Brazil
- Height: 1.92 m (6 ft 4 in)
- Position: Centre-back

Team information
- Current team: Fortaleza
- Number: 23

Youth career
- 2011: Camboriú

Senior career*
Years	Team	Apps	(Gls)
2011–2013	Camboriú	26	(0)
2014	Brusque	17	(0)
2014	Avaí	4	(0)
2015	Metropolitano	12	(1)
2015–2016	Santa Cruz	54	(0)
2017	Internacional	2	(0)
2017	Sport	1	(0)
2018	Paraná	17	(1)
2018–2020	Boavista	62	(2)
2020–2022	Al-Wasl	27	(3)
2021–2022	→ Al-Hazem (loan)	26	(0)
2023–2024	Cruzeiro	43	(0)
2024–2026	Vitória	38	(1)
2026–	Fortaleza	0	(0)
- * Club domestic league appearances and goals as of 8 April 2026

Hueglo dos Santos Neris (born 17 June 1992), is a Brazilian professional footballer who plays as a centre-back for Fortaleza.

He previously played for Paraná. On 27 July 2021, Neris joined Saudi Arabian club Al-Hazem on loan from Al-Wasl.

== Honours ==
Santa Cruz

- Taça Chico Science: 2016
- Copa do Nordeste: 2016
- Campeonato Pernambucano: 2016
