= Ahmed Al-Juwaid =

Saudi Arabian footballer

Personal information
- Full name: Ahmed Abdullah Al-Juwaid
- Date of birth: 3 February 1995 (age 31)
- Place of birth: Saudi Arabia
- Height: 1.72 m (5 ft 8 in)
- Position: Midfielder

Team information
- Current team: Al-Orobah
- Number: 6

Youth career
- Al-Omran

Senior career*
Years	Team	Apps	(Gls)
2015–2019	Al-Omran		
2019	Al-Rawdhah	8	(0)
2019–2021	Al-Nojoom	59	(1)
2021–2024	Al-Hazem	39	(0)
2024–2025	Al-Tai	27	(0)
2025–	Al-Orobah	0	(0)
- * Club domestic league appearances and goals as of 12 August 2021

Ahmed Al-Juwaid (Arabic: احمد الجويد, born 3 February 1995) is a Saudi Arabian professional footballer who plays as a midfielder for Al-Orobah.

== Career ==
Al-Juwaid started his career at Al-Omran and spent four seasons at the club. On 16 January 2019, Al-Juwaid joined Al-Rawdhah. He made 8 appearances as Al-Rawdhah earned promotion to the Second Division by finishing as runners-up in the 2018–19 Third Division. On 10 July 2019, Al-Juwaid joined MS League side Al-Nojoom. He spent two seasons at the club and left following their relegation. On 8 July 2021, Al-Juwaid signed a three-year deal with Pro League side Al-Hazem. He made his debut on 12 August 2021 in the 3–3 draw against Al-Taawoun. On 24 July 2024, Al-Juwaid joined Al-Tai. In September 2025, Al-Juwaid joined Al-Orobah.

== Honours ==
Al-Rawdhah

- Saudi Third Division runners-up: 2018–19
