= Fahad Al-Obaid =

Saudi Arabian footballer

Personal information
- Full name: Fahad Mansour Fahad Al-Obaid
- Date of birth: November 3, 1992 (age 34)
- Place of birth: Saudi Arabia
- Height: 1.81 m (5 ft 11 in)
- Position: Left back

Youth career
- Sdoos

Senior career*
Years	Team	Apps	(Gls)
2013–2019	Sdoos		
2019–2021	Al-Mujazzal		
2021–2024	Al-Hazem	49	(0)
2024–2026	Al-Diriyah		
- * Club domestic league appearances and goals as of 31 May 2021

Fahad Al-Obaid (Arabic: فهد العبيد; born 3 November 1992) is a Saudi Arabian professional footballer who plays as a left back.

== Career ==
Al-Obaid started out his career at Sdoos. On 22 January 2019, Al-Obaid joined Al-Mujazzal. On 7 February 2021, Al-Obaid joined Al-Hazem. In his first season at the club he made 11 appearances as Al-Hazem were crowned champions of the MS League. On 12 September 2021, Al-Obaid made his Pro League debut in the 0–2 defeat against Al-Shabab. On 25 July 2024, Al-Obaid joined Al-Diriyah.

== Honours ==
Al-Hazem

- MS League: 2020–21
