= Farhan Al-Aazmi =

Saudi Arabian footballer (born 1994)

Personal information
- Full name: Farhan Freeh Farhan Al Darwish Al-Aazmi
- Date of birth: July 31, 1994 (age 32)
- Place of birth: Saudi Arabia
- Height: 1.75 m (5 ft 9 in)
- Position: Left back

Team information
- Current team: Al-Hazem
- Number: 12

Youth career
- Al-Bukiryah

Senior career*
Years	Team	Apps	(Gls)
2016–2020	Al-Bukiryah		
2020–	Al-Hazem	75	(5)
- * Club domestic league appearances and goals as of 29 August 2023

Farhan Al-Aazmi (Arabic: فرحان العازمي; born 31 July 1994) is a Saudi Arabian professional footballer who plays as a left back for Pro League side Al-Hazem.

== Career ==
Al-Aazmi started out his career at Al-Bukiryah. He helped Al-Bukiryah earn promotion to the MS League for the first time in their history. He also helped Al-Bukiryah finish 4th in their first season in MS League. On 27 September 2020, Al-Aazmi joined Al-Hazem. On 6 May 2021, he renewed his contract until 2024. In his first season at the club, Al-Aazmi made 34 appearances and scored 4 goals as Al-Hazem were crowned champions of the MS League. On 12 August 2021, Al-Aazmi made his Pro League debut playing the full 90 minutes against Al-Taawoun.

== Honours ==
Al-Bukiryah

- Second Division runners-up: 2018–19

Al-Hazem

- MS League: 2020–21
