= Ibrahim Zaid =

Saudi Arabian footballer (born 1990)

Personal information
- Full name: Ibrahim Zaid Al-Malki
- Date of birth: 22 January 1990 (age 36)
- Place of birth: Saudi Arabia
- Height: 1.90 m (6 ft 3 in)
- Position: Goalkeeper

Team information
- Current team: Al-Hazem
- Number: 23

Youth career
- Al-Shabab

Senior career*
Years	Team	Apps	(Gls)
2009–2014	Al-Shabab	1	(0)
2013	→ Al Hilal (loan)	0	(0)
2014–2018	Al Faisaly	28	(0)
2018–2019	Al-Washm	18	(0)
2019–2020	Al-Tai	7	(0)
2020–	Al-Hazem	50	(0)
- * Club domestic league appearances and goals as of 29 May 2023

Ibrahim Zaid [إبراهيم زايد in Arabic] (born 22 January 1990) is a Saudi Arabian professional footballer who plays as a goalkeeper for Al-Hazem. He is the brother of former goalkeeper Mabrouk Zaid.

== Honours ==
Al-Shabab

- King Cup: 2014

Al-Hazem

- MS League: 2020–21
